= History of Malaysian football =

Football is the most popular national sport in Malaysia, where the first modern set of rules were established in 1921. It is run by the Football Association of Malaysia. The association administers the national football teams and league competitions.

In 1997, Malaysia hosted the FIFA U-20 World Cup, but known as FIFA World Youth Championship during that time. In 2007, Malaysia co-hosted the Asian Cup 2007 with three other countries.

The most significant successes of the national team of Malaysia has come in the regional AFF Suzuki Cup (formerly known as the Tiger Cup), which Malaysia won in 2010 for the first time in history. They beat Indonesia 4–2 on aggregate in the final to capture the country's first major international football title.

Malaysia had many top players, such as the legendary Mokhtar Dahari and Sabah's Hassan Sani and James Wong, which led Malaysia into their golden age during the 1970s until the 1980s. Before Mokhtar, the Malaysian King of Football Datuk Abdul Ghani Minhat was the most famous and respected footballer in the whole Malaya during the 1950s and 1960s. Malaysia's 15–1 victory over the Philippines in 1962 is currently the highest win of the national team.

In the FIFA World Rankings, Malaysia's highest standing was in the first release of the figures, in August 1993 at 75th. Malaysia's main rival on the international stage are their geographical neighbors, Indonesia and Singapore, and past matches between these two teams have produced much drama. Malaysia is one of the most successful teams in Southeast Asia along with Indonesia, Singapore, Thailand and Vietnam, winning the ASEAN Football Championship in 2010.

== History ==
=== 1900 to 1978 ===
Football arrived in Malaysia, (Malaya at that time), with the British. The locals soon picked up the game, and soon it was the country's leading sport. Towards the end of the 19th century, football was one of the central pillars of most sports clubs in Malaya. Even when the Selangor Association Football League (SAFL) took shape in 1906 – which ensured proper administration and organization – the competition was confined only to clubs in Kuala Lumpur.

The earliest states to establish football leagues were Penang in 1905 and Selangor in 1906. YMCA became the first winner of the Penang Football League in 1906, while Royal Selangor Club was the first winner of the SAFL in the same year.

In January 1921, the British Royal Navy battleship H. M. S. Malaya was called at Port Swettenham (now Port Klang), Singapore, Malacca, Penang and Port Dickson. During its stay, the crew competed in friendly matches in football, rugby, hockey, sailing and golf against local clubs.

Three months later, the Chief Secretary of the Federated Malay States received a letter from Captain H. T. Buller of the H. M. S. Malaya, which offered two cups to be competed for in football and rugby as tokens of their gratitude for the reception they received in Malaya. The cup for football were then known as the Malaya Cup The offer was accepted and various club representatives met to organize the tournament. Malaya Cup committee was set up and it was decided to run the football competition in northern and southern sections. The first tournament were entrusted to be run by the Selangor Club. The first ever Malaya Cup match was played on 20 August 1921, with Selangor defeating Penang 5–1 in front of an estimated crowd of 5,000 in Kuala Lumpur. The inaugural tournament were played by six teams and won by Singapore. During 1923, a newspaper described it as “by far the greatest sporting event of the year (in Malaya)”.

In 1926, the Football Associations of Perak, Selangor, Negeri Sembilan, Malacca, and the Singapore Amateur Football Association came together to form the Malayan Football Association (MFA). Later, in 1932, the MFA was renamed the Football Association of Malaya (FAM), as it is known today. By 1954, FAM joins FIFA as a member in AFC.

The Malaysia FAM Cup was established in 1952 as a secondary knockout competition to the more prestigious Malaya Cup. The competitions were held between the state teams, including Singapore, the Police, Army and the Prisons Department of Malaysia, in their early days.

In 1959, the Malaya Cup departed from the traditional one-round tournament to a two-round home and away format in three zones (East, South, and North).

FAM changed its name to Football Association of Malaysia (FAM) in the early 1960s to coincide with the formation of Malaysia. A new trophy for the Malaya Cup was inaugurated in 1967, and since then, the competition has been known as the Malaysia Cup.

Starting in 1974, the state teams were barred from entering the FAM Cup, and only the club sides could enter. In 1976 Penang was the first club from Malaysia which won the Aga Khan Gold Cup.

=== 1979–1988: Era of Amateur Football League ===
A Malaysian football league competition involving the representatives of the state football associations was first held in 1979. When it began, it was intended primarily as a qualifying tournament for the final knock-out stages of the Malaysia Cup, where teams compete in a one-round league before advancing to the knock-out stage. The top four teams at the end of the league would face off in two semi-finals before the winners made it to the finals. In 1981, the quarter-final stage was introduced, where eight teams qualified from the preliminary stage.

However, it was not until 1982 that a league trophy was introduced to recognise the winners of the preliminary stage as the league champions. Since then, the Malaysia Cup has been held after the conclusion of the league each year, with only the best-performing teams in the league qualifying.

=== 1989–1993: Era of semi-pro football League ===
Over the years, the league competition has gained important stature in its own right. From 1982 until 1988, the league continued its purpose as a qualifying round for Malaysia Cup. In 1989, it was changed to a new format, the Malaysian Semi-Pro Football League (MSPFL), nearing fully professional status.

Initially, the only teams allowed to participate in the league were the state FA's sides, teams representing the Armed Forces and the Police, and teams representing the neighboring countries of Singapore and Brunei (though the Football Association of Singapore pulled out of the Malaysian League after the 1994 season following a dispute with the FAM).

The inaugural season of the MSPFL consisted of nine teams in First Division I and eight teams in Second Division. The Malaysian Police joined Division II in 1990. Games were played on a home and away basis for about four months, roughly between the end of April or early May and the end of August or early September. Under the new format, only the top six teams in Division I and the Division II champions and runners-up would be involved in the Malaysia Cup. The Malaysia Cup was played in the quarter-final stage, scheduled for November after the league was finished.

In 1990, a new national knockout competition was introduced by the FAM, called the Malaysia FA Cup. Perak is the winner of the inaugural season of the cup.

In 1992, FAM created another amateur league for local clubs, the Liga Nasional. The league was managed by an outside FAM entity, Super Club Sdn. Bhd. Some of the clubs that competed in the league were Hong Chin, Muar FA, PKNK Kedah, DBKL, PKNS, BSN, LPN, BBMB, Proton, PPC and PKENJ. Unfortunately, the league only ran for one season before folding. Some of the clubs then evolved and joined the main league, such as PKENJ, which became Johor FC.

In 1993, the format of the competition was changed to include a two-group league, followed by the traditional knockout format. Promotion to the professional Malaysian League was introduced for the first time in 1997. Johor FC and NS Chempaka FC were the first two sides to be promoted that year.

=== 1994 to 1997: Era of professional football ===
MSPFL was the nation's top-tier league until the formation of the Malaysia Premier League (1994–97) in 1994 by the FAM.

In its inaugural season, 16 teams competed in the league. The teams were based in all states in Malaysia and two foreign teams; Singapore and Brunei.

=== 1998 to 2003: Clubs inclusion in main league ===
In 1998, the Malaysia Premier League was divided into two divisions, consisting of Malaysia Premier League 1 and Malaysia Premier League 2 (Liga Perdana 1 and Liga Perdana 2).

During 1998, Malaysia Premier League 1 consisted of 12 teams, while Malaysia Premier League 2 had 8 teams. 10 teams that previously played in the 1997 Malaysia Premier League were automatically qualified for the Malaysia Premier League 1. The other two spots were filled by a playoff round of the five lowest teams and the Malaysian Olympic football team. They were then put into the Malaysia Premier League 2 alongside Police, Malaysia Military, Negeri Sembilan Chempaka F.C., and PKN Johor. At this time, the league still consisted of semi-pro teams, where each team was allowed to register 25 players (minimum of 12 professionals for MPL 1 and 6 professionals for MPL 2).

=== 2004 to present: Era of Malaysia Super League ===
Both leagues continued until 2003, when the Football Association of Malaysia (FAM) decided to privatize the league and the Malaysia Super League was formed. Teams in Malaysia Premier League 1 and Malaysia Premier League 2 were then put through a qualification and play-off process to be promoted into the Malaysia Super League. Teams that failed the qualification were put into a new second-tier Malaysia Premier League.

Starting in 2016, the Football Malaysia LLP (FMLLP), which is now known as the Malaysian Football League (MFL), took over all the top-tier professional football competitions. Under the new management, all clubs in the Malaysian league enjoyed their first ever season in 2021 as private football clubs. The Football Association of Malaysia (FAM) has been pushing its member clubs towards privatization in a bid to end their reliance on state funds.

Further changes were made to the Malaysia FAM Cup in 2008, where the knockout stages were abolished and the double round-robin format was introduced. The tournament became known as the Malaysia FAM League. In 2018, a new subsidiary of the company was formed known as the Amateur Football League (AFL), which was tasked with managing the third division and below from 2019 onward. The AFL officially confirmed the formation of the Malaysia M3 League and the Malaysia M4 League as the third and fourth divisions of the Malaysian football league system as amateur league competitions.

== Records ==
Below are the record of teams in Malaysian football competitions since 1921 till present. Clubs in bold compete in Liga Super Malaysia as of the 2025–26 season; clubs in italic no longer exist.

Team	(First Division) Liga Malaysia (1982-1988), Liga Semi-Pro Divisyen 1, Liga Perdana (1994-1997), Liga Perdana 1, Liga Super Malaysia	(Second Division) Liga Semi-Pro Divisyen 2, Liga Perdana 2, Liga Premier	(Third Division) Malaysia A1 Semi-Pro League	(Fourth Division) Malaysia A2 Amateur League	Malaysia FA Cup	Malaysia Cup	MFL Challenge Cup	Malaysia Charity Shield	MFL Cup	Malaysia President Cup	Piala Belia	Malaysia FAM Cup	Liga Bolasepak Rakyat	AFC Champions League Elite/AFC Champions League/Asian Club Championship	AFC Champions League Two/AFC Cup/Asian Cup Winner's Cup	Total
**Selangor**	6	2	-	-	**5**	**33**	**1**	8	-	5	**4**	**7**	-	**1 (Runners-up)** 1967	1 (Quarter Final) 2006	**71**
**Johor Darul Ta’zim** (Note: Formerly known as Johor FC)	**12**	1	-	-	**5**	6	-	**10**	-	5	2	2	-	**1 (Quarter Final)** 2025-26	**1 (Champions)** 2015	43
Singapore	2	-	-	-	-	24	-	1	-	1	-	2	-	-	-	30
Kedah Darul Aman	3	**4**	-	-	**5**	5	-	3	-	3	1	-	-	1 (1st Round) 1994-95	1 (Quarter Final) 2008	24
Kelantan	2	1	-	-	2	2	-	1	-	**7**	2	3	-	-	1 (Quarter Final) 2012	20
Perak	2	-	-	-	2	8	-	3	-	3	1	-	-	2 (Group Stage) 1969, 1971	2 (Quarter Final) 2004 2008	19
**Penang**	3	1	-	-	1	4	-	1	-	1	-	5	-	-	-	17
**Kuala Lumpur City**	2	1	-	-	3	4	-	3	-	3	-	-	-	2 (Group Stage) 1987, 1989-90	1 (Runners-Up) 2022	16
Sri Pahang	5	-	-	-	3	4	-	3	-	-	-	-	-	1 (Semi Final Group Round) 1988-89	1 (Quarter Final) 2015	15
**Negeri Sembilan**	1	2	-	-	2	3	-	1	-	2	-	-	-	-	2 (Group Stage) 2004 2007	11
**Terengganu**	-	2	-	-	2	1	-	1	-	3	1	1	-	-	1 (Round of 16) 2012	11
(Johor) JDT II (Note: Formerly known as Johor FA)	1	2	**1**	-	1	2	**1**	1	**1**	1	-	-	-	-	-	11
Perlis	1	1	-	-	-	2	-	2	-	-	-	-	-	-	1(Group Stage) 2006	6
Selangor FC II (Note: Formerly known as PKNS FC)	-	1	-	-	-	-	-	-	-	1	1	3	-	-	-	6
Sarawak	1	1	-	-	1	-	-	1	-	1	-	-	-	-	1 (Quarter Final) 1998-99	5
**Sabah**	1	1	-	-	1	-	**1**	-	-	1	-	-	-	-	2 (2nd Round) 1995 , (ASEAN Zonal Semi-Final) 2023-24	5
Armed Forces	-	1	-	-	-	-	-	1	-	-	-	2	-	-	-	4
(Kuala Lumpur) DBKL S.C.	-	-	-	-	-	-	-	-	-	-	-	4	-	-	-	4
(Selangor) MBPJ	-	1	-	-	-	1	-	1	-	-	-	1	-	-	-	4
(Malacca) Melaka United	1	1	-	-	-	-	-	-	-	1	-	1	-	1 (1st Preliminary Round) 1985-86	-	4
Penjara F.C.	-	-	-	-	-	-	-	-	-	-	-	3	-	-	-	3
(Pahang) Kuantan	-	-	-	-	-	-	-	-	-	-	-	3	-	-	-	3
(Malaysia) **PDRM**	-	2	-	-	-	-	**1**	-	-	-	-	-	-	-	-	3
Terengganu II (Note: Formerly known as T-Team)	-	-	-	-	-	-	**1**	-	**1**	-	-	1	-	-	-	3
(Singapore) LionsXII	1	-	-	-	1	-	-	-	-	-	-	-	-	-	-	2
(Kelantan) JKR F.C.	-	-	-	-	-	-	-	-	-	-	-	2	-	-	-	2
(Kedah) PKNK F.C.	-	-	-	-	-	-	-	-	-	-	-	2	-	-	-	2
(Penang) SPPP F.C	-	-	-	-	-	-	-	-	-	-	-	2	-	-	-	2
(Malacca) Melaka TM F.C.	-	-	-	-	-	-	-	-	-	-	-	2	-	-	1 (1st Round) 1997-98	2
(Malaysia) Sime Darby F.C.	-	-	-	-	-	-	-	-	-	-	-	2	-	-	-	2
(Federal Territories of Malaysia) Felda United	-	2	-	-	-	-	-	-	-	-	-	-	-	-	1 (Group Stage) 2017	2
Brunei	-	-	-	-	-	1	-	-	-	-	-	-	-	-	-	1
(Penang) Intel F.C.	-	-	-	-	-	-	-	-	-	-	-	1	-	-	-	1
(Negeri Sembilan) NS Indians FC	-	-	-	-	-	-	-	-	-	-	-	1	-	-	-	1
UMNO Selangor F.C.	-	-	-	-	-	-	-	-	-	-	-	1	-	-	-	1
(Selangor) Kelab Sukan Adabi	-	-	-	-	-	-	-	-	-	-	-	1	-	-	-	1
(Kelantan) Kelab Kilat Kota Bahru	-	-	-	-	-	-	-	-	-	-	-	1	-	-	-	1
(Pahang) Darul Makmur F.C.	-	-	-	-	-	-	-	-	-	-	-	1	-	-	-	1
(Selangor) Kelab Sultan Sulaiman	-	-	-	-	-	-	-	-	-	-	-	1	-	-	-	1
Johor Bahru FA	-	-	-	-	-	-	-	-	-	-	-	1	-	-	-	1
(Kuala Lumpur) KL Cheq Point F.C.	-	-	-	-	-	-	-	-	-	-	-	1	-	-	-	1
(Penang) PDC F.C.	-	-	-	-	-	-	-	-	-	-	-	1	-	-	-	1
(Kelantan) JPS F.C.	-	-	-	-	-	-	-	-	-	-	-	1	-	-	-	1
(Penang) Suria NTFA F.C.	-	-	-	-	-	-	-	-	-	-	-	1	-	-	-	1
(Johor) Pasir Gudang United	-	-	-	-	-	-	-	-	-	-	-	1	-	-	-	1
(Selangor) Proton F.C.;	-	-	-	-	-	-	-	-	-	-	-	1	-	-	-	1
(Selangor) DRB Hicom (Note: Formerly known as Pos Malaysia)	-	-	-	-	-	-	-	-	-	-	-	1	-	-	-	1
(Negeri Sembilan) NS Betaria	-	-	-	-	-	-	-	-	-	-	-	1	-	-	-	1
Putrajaya SPA	-	-	-	-	-	-	-	-	-	-	-	1	-	-	-	1
(Selangor) Petaling Jaya City (Note: Formerly known as MIFA)	-	-	-	-	-	-	-	-	-	-	-	1	-	-	-	1
Terengganu City	-	-	-	-	-	-	-	-	-	-	-	1	-	-	-	1
(Kelantan) Gua Musang FA	-	-	-	-	-	-	-	-	-	-	-	-	1	-	-	1
(Sarawak) **Kuching City** (Note: Formerly known as Kuching FA)	-	-	-	-	-	-	-	-	-	-	-	-	1	-	-	1
**Kelantan The Real Warriors** (Note: Formerly known as Kelantan United)	-	-	**1**	-	-	-	-	-	-	-	-	-	-	-	-	1
(Selangor) PIB Shah Alam	-	-	**1**	-	-	-	-	-	-	-	-	-	-	-	-	1
(Putrajaya) **Immigration**	-	-	**1**	-	-	-	-	-	-	-	-	-	-	-	-	1
(Malacca) **Melaka**	-	-	**1**	-	-	-	-	-	-	-	-	-	-	-	-	1
(Negeri Sembilan) SAINS F.C. (Note: Formerly known as KSR SAINS)	-	-	-	**1**	-	-	-	-	-	-	-	-	-	-	-	1
(Selangor) UiTM United (Note: Formerly known as UiTM FC)	-	-	-	**1**	-	-	-	-	-	-	-	-	-	-	-	1
Perlis GSA (Note: Formerly known as Guar Syed Alwi)	-	-	-	**1**	-	-	-	-	-	-	-	-	-	-	-	1
(Kelantan) AZM Rovers	-	-	-	**1**	-	-	-	-	-	-	-	-	-	-	-	1

- Table shows teams' wins in all competitions
- The figures in bold represent the most times this competition has been won by the team
- Malaysia Super League Record Fastest goal in a match: **9 seconds**
  - (Brazil) Rafael Vitor for Penang against Perak (3 August 2021)

== Hall of fame ==
=== League ===
Year	Champion	Runners-up	Third place
1982	Penang	Kuala Lumpur	Selangor
1983	Malacca	Penang	Kelantan
1984	Selangor	Pahang	Penang
1985	Singapore	Johor	Pahang
1986	Kuala Lumpur	Singapore	Selangor
1987	Pahang	Kuala Lumpur	Singapore
1988	Kuala Lumpur	Singapore	Kelantan
1989	Selangor	Kuala Lumpur	Kedah
1990	Selangor	Singapore	Perak
1991	Johor	Pahang	Perak
1992	Pahang	Terengganu	Negeri Sembilan
1993	Kedah	Sarawak	Perak
1994	Singapore	Kedah	Sarawak
1995	Pahang	Selangor	Sarawak
1996	Sabah	Kedah	Negeri Sembilan
1997	Sarawak	Kedah	Sabah
1998	Penang	Pahang	Brunei
1999	Pahang	Penang	Negeri Sembilan
2000	Selangor	Penang	Perak
2001	Penang	Terengganu	Kelantan
2002	Perak	Selangor	Sabah
2003	Perak	Kedah	Perlis
2004	Pahang	Selangor Public Bank	Perlis
2005	Perlis	Pahang	Perak
2006	Negeri Sembilan	Melaka TMFC	Perak
2007	Kedah	Perak	Brunei DPMM
2008	Kedah	Negeri Sembilan	Johor FC
2009	Selangor	Perlis	Kedah
2010	Selangor	Kelantan	Terengganu
2011	Kelantan	Terengganu	Selangor
2012	Kelantan	LIONSXII	Selangor
2013	LionsXII	Selangor	Johor Darul Ta'zim
2014	Johor Darul Ta'zim	Selangor	Pahang
2015	Johor Darul Ta'zim	Selangor	Pahang
2016	Johor Darul Ta'zim	Felda United	Kedah
2017	Johor Darul Ta'zim	Pahang	Felda United
2018	Johor Darul Ta'zim	Perak	PKNS
2019	Johor Darul Ta'zim	Pahang	Selangor
2020	Johor Darul Ta'zim	Kedah	Terengganu
2021	Johor Darul Ta'zim	Kedah	Penang
2022	Johor Darul Ta'zim	Terengganu	Sabah
2023	Johor Darul Ta'zim	Selangor	Sabah
2024–25	Johor Darul Ta'zim	Selangor	Sabah
2025–26	Johor Darul Ta'zim	Kuching City	Selangor

=== Cups ===
Year	Malaysia Cup / Malaysia Challenge Cup	Malaysia FA Cup	FAM Cup / Malaysia A1 Semi-Pro League
1921	Singapore	No competition	No competition
1922	Selangor	No competition	No competition
1923	Singapore	No competition	No competition
1924	Singapore	No competition	No competition
1925	Singapore	No competition	No competition
1926	Perak	No competition	No competition
1927	Selangor	No competition	No competition
1928	Selangor & Singapore	No competition	No competition
1929	Selangor & Singapore	No competition	No competition
1930	Singapore	No competition	No competition
1931	Perak	No competition	No competition
1932	Singapore	No competition	No competition
1933	Singapore	No competition	No competition
1934	Singapore	No competition	No competition
1935	Selangor	No competition	No competition
1936	Selangor	No competition	No competition
1937	Singapore	No competition	No competition
1938	Selangor	No competition	No competition
1939	Singapore	No competition	No competition
1940	Singapore	No competition	No competition
1941	Singapore	No competition	No competition
1942–47	No competition due to World War II	No competition	No competition
1948	Negeri Sembilan	No competition	No competition
1949	Selangor	No competition	No competition
1950	Singapore	No competition	No competition
1951	Singapore	No competition	No competition
1952	Singapore	No competition	Penang
1953	Penang	No competition	Kelantan & Selangor
1954	Penang	No competition	Kelantan
1955	Singapore	No competition	Penang
1956	Selangor	No competition	Penang
1957	Perak	No competition	Penang
1958	Penang	No competition	Malaysian Combined Services
1959	Selangor	No competition	Perak
1960	Singapore	No competition	Selangor
1961	Selangor	No competition	Selangor
1962	Selangor	No competition	Selangor
1963	Selangor	No competition	Singapore
1964	Singapore	No competition	Perak
1965	Singapore	No competition	Perak
1966	Selangor	No competition	Selangor
1967	Perak	No competition	Singapore
1968	Selangor	No competition	Selangor
1969	Selangor	No competition	Terengganu
1970	Perak	No competition	Prisons
1971	Selangor	No competition	Prisons
1972	Selangor	No competition	Selangor
1973	Selangor	No competition	Prisons
1974	Penang	No competition	Selangor Umno
1975	Selangor	No competition	Kuantan
1976	Selangor	No competition	Adabi Sports Club
1977	Singapore	No competition	Kuantan & Kilat Kota Bharu
1978	Selangor	No competition	NS Indians & Selangor PKNS
1979	Selangor	No competition	Selangor PKNS
1980	Singapore	No competition	Darulmakmur FC
1981	Selangor	No competition	Penang Port Commission
1982	Selangor	No competition	Sultan Sulaiman Club
1983	Pahang	No competition	Penang Port Commission
1984	Selangor	No competition	Johor Bahru
1985	Johor	No competition	Cheq Point FC
1986	Selangor	No competition	Penang Development Corporation
1987	Kuala Lumpur	No competition	Kuala Lumpur City Hall
1988	Kuala Lumpur	No competition	Kuala Lumpur City Hall
1989	Kuala Lumpur	No competition	Kedah
1990	Kedah	Perak	Kuala Lumpur City Hall
1991	Johor	Selangor	Kuala Lumpur City Hall
1992	Pahang	Sarawak	Kedah
1993	Kedah	Kuala Lumpur	Intel FC
1994	Singapore	Kuala Lumpur	Johor SEDC (PKENJ)
1995	Selangor	Sabah	Johor SEDC (PKENJ)
1996	Selangor	Kedah	Melaka Telekom
1997	Selangor	Selangor	Armed Forces
1998	Perak	Johor	Melaka Telekom
1999	Brunei	Kuala Lumpur	Kelantan JKR
2000	Perak	Terengganu	Kelantan JKR
2001	Terengganu	Selangor	Selangor MPPJ
2002	Selangor	Penang	Kelantan JPS
2003	Selangor MPPJ	Negeri Sembilan	Selangor PKNS
2004	Perlis	Perak	Suria NTFA
2005	Selangor	Selangor	Kelantan
2006	Perlis	Pahang	Pasir Gudang United
2007	Kedah	Kedah	Proton
2008	Kedah	Kedah	T-Team
2009	Negeri Sembilan	Selangor	Pos Malaysia
2010	Kelantan	Negeri Sembilan	Sime Darby
2011	Negeri Sembilan	Terengganu	NS Betaria
2012	Kelantan	Kelantan	KL SPA
2013	Pahang	Kelantan	Penang
2014	Pahang	Pahang	Kuantan
2015	Selangor	LionsXII	Melaka United
2016	Kedah	Johor Darul Ta'zim	MISC-MIFA
2017	Johor Darul Ta'zim	Kedah	Sime Darby
2018	Perak / Terengganu II	Pahang	Terengganu City
2019	Johor Darul Ta'zim / Johor Darul Ta'zim II	Kedah	Kelantan United
2020	No competition	No competition	No competition
2021	Kuala Lumpur	No competition	No competition
2022	Johor Darul Ta'zim	Johor Darul Ta'zim	PIB FC
2023	Johor Darul Ta'zim / PDRM	Johor Darul Ta'zim	Immigration FC
2024–25	Johor Darul Ta'zim / Selangor	Johor Darul Ta'zim	Melaka
2025–26	Johor Darul Ta'zim / Sabah	Johor Darul Ta'zim	Johor Darul Ta'zim II

=== Three major professional-era competitions (1994–present) ===
Year	League	FA Cup	Malaysia Cup
1994	Singapore	Kuala Lumpur	Singapore
1995	Pahang	Sabah	Selangor
1996	Sabah	Kedah	Selangor
1997	Sarawak	Selangor	Selangor
1998	Penang	Johor	Perak
1999	Pahang	Kuala Lumpur	Brunei
2000	Selangor	Terengganu	Perak
2001	Penang	Selangor	Terengganu
2002	Perak	Penang	Selangor
2003	Perak	Negeri Sembilan	Selangor MPPJ
2004	Pahang	Perak	Perlis
2005	Perlis	Selangor	Selangor
2006	Negeri Sembilan	Pahang	Perlis
2007	Kedah	Kedah	Kedah
2008	Kedah	Kedah	Kedah
2009	Selangor	Selangor	Negeri Sembilan
2010	Selangor	Negeri Sembilan	Kelantan
2011	Kelantan	Terengganu	Negeri Sembilan
2012	Kelantan	Kelantan	Kelantan
2013	LionsXII	Kelantan	Pahang
2014	Johor Darul Ta'zim	Pahang	Pahang
2015	Johor Darul Ta'zim	LionsXII	Selangor
2016	Johor Darul Ta'zim	Johor Darul Ta'zim	Kedah
2017	Johor Darul Ta'zim	Kedah	Johor Darul Ta'zim
2018	Johor Darul Ta'zim	Pahang	Perak
2019	Johor Darul Ta'zim	Kedah	Johor Darul Ta'zim
2020	Johor Darul Ta'zim	No competition	No competition
2021	Johor Darul Ta'zim	No competition	Kuala Lumpur
2022	Johor Darul Ta'zim	Johor Darul Ta'zim	Johor Darul Ta'zim
2023	Johor Darul Ta'zim	Johor Darul Ta'zim	Johor Darul Ta'zim
2024–25	Johor Darul Ta'zim	Johor Darul Ta'zim	Johor Darul Ta'zim
2025–26	Johor Darul Ta'zim	Johor Darul Ta'zim	Johor Darul Ta'zim

== Great honours ==
=== Triple quadruple ===
Team	Seasons	Winning titles
Johor Darul Ta'zim	2022	Super League, FA Cup, Malaysia Cup, Piala Sumbangsih
Johor Darul Ta'zim	2023	Super League, FA Cup, Malaysia Cup, Piala Sumbangsih
Johor Darul Ta'zim	2024–25	Super League, FA Cup, Malaysia Cup, Piala Sumbangsih

=== Treble ===
Team	Seasons	Winning titles
Kedah	2006–07	Super League, FA Cup, Malaysia Cup
Kedah	2007–08	Super League, FA Cup, Malaysia Cup
Kelantan	2012	Super League, FA Cup, Malaysia Cup

=== Double ===
Team	Seasons	Winning titles
Selangor	1984	Malaysian League, Malaysia Cup
Kuala Lumpur	1988	Malaysian League, Malaysia Cup
Johor	1991	Liga Semi-Pro Divisyen 1, Malaysia Cup
Pahang	1992	Liga Semi-Pro Divisyen 1, Malaysia Cup
Kedah	1993	Liga Semi-Pro Divisyen 1, Malaysia Cup
Singapore	1994	Liga Perdana, Malaysia Cup
Selangor	2009	Super League, FA Cup
Johor Darul Ta'zim	2015	Super League, AFC Cup
Johor Darul Ta'zim	2016	Super League, FA Cup
Johor Darul Ta'zim	2017	Super League, Malaysia Cup
Johor Darul Ta'zim	2019	Super League, Malaysia Cup

== See also ==
- A1 Semi-Pro League
- A2 Amateur League
- A3 Community League
- FAM Football Awards
