= Ahmad Yusof =

Malaysian footballer

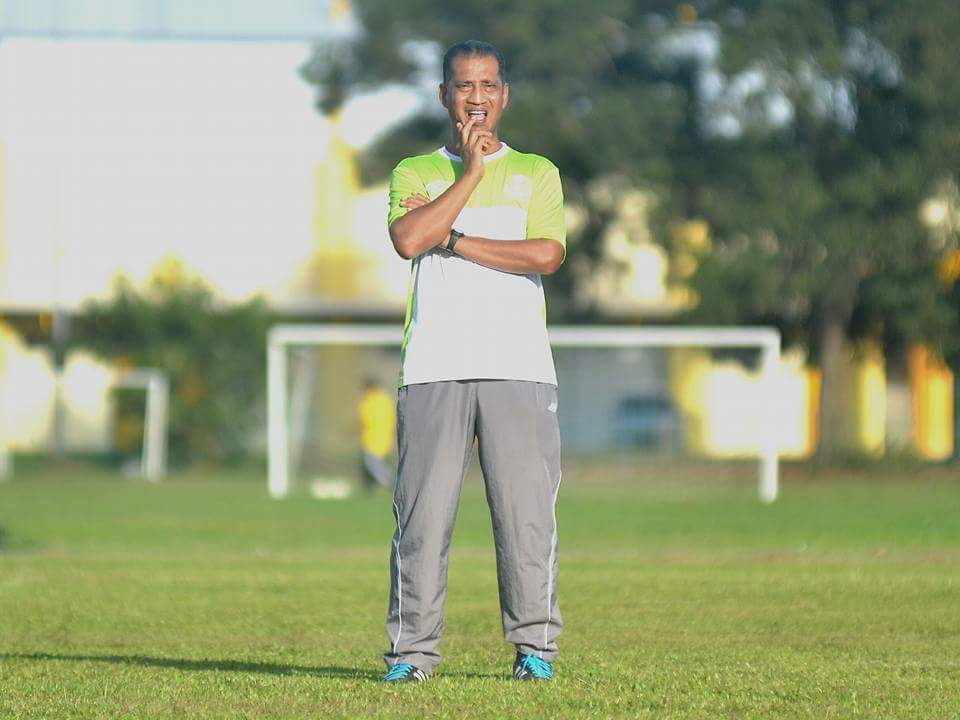

Personal information
- Date of birth: 8 August 1960 (age 66)
- Place of birth: Bayan Lepas, Penang
- Position: Midfielder

Team information
- Current team: Sri Pahang (Assistant coach)

Senior career*
Years	Team	Apps	(Gls)
1979–1983	Penang		
1984–1995	Pahang		

International career
1981–1993	Malaysia	92	(6)

Managerial career
- 2008: Pahang
- 2010–2011: Kedah
- 2016: Terengganu
- 2017: Sime Darby
- 2018: Terengganu Hanelang
- 2018–2019: Penang
- 2023–: Sri Pahang (assistant)
Medal record
Men's football
Representing Malaysia
SEA Games
Gold medal – first place	1989 Jakarta	Team
- * Club domestic league appearances and goals

Ahmad Yusof (sometimes spelt as Ahmad yusoff) is a Malaysian former professional footballer who played for Penang and Pahang as a midfielder. He is currently working as the assistant coach of Malaysia Super League club Sri Pahang.

== Career Overview ==
=== As a player ===
He played for Penang and Pahang in the Malaysia Cup and Malaysian League between the late 1970s to 1980s. With the Malaysia national team, he won the 1989 SEA Games gold medal. He also former national team captain. In February 1999, Asian Football Confederation recognize Ahmad Yusof achievement of representing the country 103 times (match including Olympic qualification, against national 'B' football team, club side and selection side), 92 caps is against full national team. Thus, Asian Football Confederation include him into the AFC Century Club in 1999.

=== As Head Coach ===
In the 2017 Malaysia FAM League season, he helped Sime Darby won the league. This is his first title as a head coach.

== Career statistics ==
=== International goals ===
Ahmad Yusof International Goals
#	Date	Venue	Opponent	Score	Result	Competition
1.	25 November 1982	New Delhi, India	Bangladesh		1–2	1982 Asian Games
2.	10 October 1984	Kuala Lumpur, Malaysia	Saudi Arabia		3−1	1984 Olympics Qualifications
3.	23 September 1986	Gwangju, South Korea	Qatar		1−1	1986 Asian Games
4.	18 March 1987	Kuala Lumpur, Malaysia	Thailand		2−2	1988 Olympics Qualifications
5.	11 June 1993	Singapore City, Singapore	Laos		9–0	1993 SEA Games
6.	11 June 1993	Singapore City, Singapore	Laos		9–0	1993 SEA Games

== Honours ==
=== As player ===
Penang

- Malaysia League

Winners: 1982

Pahang

- Malaysia League/Division 1/Premier League

Winners: 1987, 1992, 1995

- Malaysia Cup

Winners: 1992

- Malaysia Charity Cup

Winners: 1992, 1993

=== International ===
- SEA Games

Winners: 1989

- Merdeka Tournament

Winners: 1986, 1993

=== Individual ===
- AFC Century Club: 1999

=== As Manager ===
Kedah

- Malaysia FA Cup

- runner-up: 2010

Sime Darby

- Malaysia FAM League

- Winners: 2017

=== Individual ===
National Football Award

- Best Coach nomination: 2010
