= Liga Semi-Pro =

- Founded: 1989; 36 years ago
- Folded: 1993; 32 years ago
- Country: Malaysia
- Other club(s) from: Brunei, Singapore
- Confederation: AFC
- Divisions: Divisyen 1 Divisyen 2
- Number of clubs: 10 (Divisyen 1); 8 (Divisyen 2)
- Level on pyramid: 1–2
- Domestic cup(s): Piala Malaysia; Piala FA
- Broadcaster(s): RTM

Liga Semi-Pro (English: Semi-Pro League) was a semi-pro football league in Malaysia that operated from 1989 until 1993. The league was managed by the Football Association of Malaysia.

During its inaugural season, 17 teams participated in the league, divided in two divisions. Nine teams were in Divisyen 1 and eight teams in Divisyen 2. Under the new format, only the top six teams in Divisyen 1 and the Divisyen 2 champions and runners-up will be involved in the Piala Malaysia. Piala Malaysia was played from the quarter-final stage, scheduled for November after the league was finished. The league was the nation's top-tier until it was succeeded by the Malaysian first professional football league, the Liga Perdana in 1994.

== History ==
=== Origin ===
In 1967 the Malaya Cup was replaced by the Piala Malaysia, but essentially amateur ethos continued until the semi-pro football league was introduced in 1979, as a halfway house towards full professional status.

It was intended primarily as a qualifying tournament for the final knock-out stages of the Piala Malaysia. It was not until 1982 that a league trophy was introduced to recognise the winners of the preliminary stage as the league champions. Over the years, the league competition has gained important stature in its own right. From 1982 until 1988 the league is an amateur status continue its purpose as qualifying round for Piala Malaysia and only in 1989 it has officially changes to a new format as Liga Semi-Pro and was also just recognised as Malaysian League.

=== Semi-Pro league system (1989–1993) ===
In early days, Malaysian football league system consisted of amateur leagues before the changes in 1989. The formation of the Liga Semi-Pro has introduced a two-tier division of football league in Malaysia.

Initially the only teams allowed to participate were the state FA's, Armed Forces and the Police, and neighbouring countries of Singapore and Brunei. The Football Association of Singapore pulled out in 1994 following a dispute over gate receipts, and has not been involved since. The Malaysian Police joined Divisyen 2 in 1990. Games were played on a home and away basis for about four months roughly between the end of April or early May and the end of August or early September.

For the first season three points were awarded for a win, one for a draw and none for a loss, but in subsequent seasons this was changed to a 2, 1, 0 basis. At the end of the league competition, the top three placed teams in both divisions received prize money, while two were relegated/promoted and a play off was staged between the eighth placed team in Divisyen 1 and the third placed team in Divisyen 2. The top six teams in Divisyen 1 and top two in Divisyen 2 also proceeded to the quarter-finals of the Piala Malaysia.

== Champions ==
Below are the list of the semi-pro league top division champions from 1989 to 1993.

Year	Champions (number of titles)	Runners-up	Third place	Leading goalscorer	Goals
1989	Selangor	Kuala Lumpur	Kedah	Zainal Abidin Hassan (Selangor)	12
1990	Selangor (2)	Singapore	Perak	Alistair Edwards (Singapore)	13
1991	Johor	Pahang	Perak	Abbas Saad (Johor)	11
1992	Pahang	Terengganu	Negeri Sembilan	Zainal Abidin Hassan (Pahang)	12
1993	Kedah	Sarawak	Perak	Mohd Hashim Mustapha (Kelantan)	13

Below are the list of the semi-pro league second division champions from 1989 to 1993.

Year	Champions (number of titles)	Runners-up	Third place
1989	Perlis	Perak	Sabah
1990	Terengganu	Kelantan	Negeri Sembilan
1991	Negeri Sembilan	Sarawak	Penang
1992	Kedah	Penang	Kelantan
1993	Selangor	Singapore	Sabah

== See also ==
- Malaysian League
- Liga Malaysia (1982–1988)
- Liga Perdana (1994–97)
