= Malaysian football league system =

The Malaysian football league system, also known as the Malaysian football pyramid, is a series of interconnected leagues for men's football clubs in Malaysia. The system has a hierarchical format with promotion and relegation between leagues at different levels, allowing even the smallest club the hypothetical possibility of ultimately rising to the very top of the system. The exact number of clubs varies from year to year as clubs join and leave leagues or fold altogether, but an estimated average of 10 clubs per division implies that hundreds of teams are members of a league in the Malaysian men's football league system.

== History ==
Football arrived in Malaysia (Malaya at that time) with the British. The locals soon picked up the game, and before long it was the country's leading sport. Towards the end of the 19th century, football was one of the central pillars of most sports clubs in Malaya, but it was not structured. Even when the Selangor Amateur Football League took shape in 1905 – which ensured proper administration and organisation – the competition was confined only to clubs in Kuala Lumpur. In 1933, the Football Association of Malaysia was founded which managed the local football scene at that time. By 1954, the FAM joined FIFA as a member of the AFC.

The system consists of a pyramid of leagues, bound together by the principle of promotion and relegation. A certain number of the most successful clubs in each league can rise to a higher league, whilst those that finish at the bottom of their league can find themselves sinking down a level. In addition to sporting performance, promotion is usually contingent on meeting criteria set by the higher league, especially concerning appropriate facilities and finances. In theory it is possible for a lowly local amateur club to rise to the pinnacle of the Malaysian game and become champions of the Malaysia Super League. As the main leagues in Malaysia consist of three tiers, it is possible for a new team to become champions in just three years if they perform well within the pyramid.

The top three levels contain one division each and are nationwide in scope. Below this, the levels have progressively more parallel leagues, which each covering progressively smaller geographic areas. Many leagues have more than one division and at the lower levels the existence of leagues becomes intermittent. There are also leagues in various parts of the country, which are not officially part of the system as they do not have formal agreements with the football associations and are run by independent organisers. These are mostly held in the form of carnival styles, where the league's duration is just a couple of days instead of months. Clubs from state leagues may, if they feel meet the appropriate standard of play and have suitable facilities, can apply to join a league which does form part of the system.

The Malaysia Super League is currently the only Malaysia's professional football league that are operated by the Malaysian Football League. Meanwhile the below three levels of the Malaysian football league system are operated by the Amateur Football League, a subsidiary of the MFL, which consists of the A1 Semi-Pro League, A2 Amateur League and the A3 Community League. All clubs in these competitions are either amateur or semi-professional clubs.

The fourth level of the Malaysian football league system consists of leagues that run in parallel. The league is managed by the Amateur Football League (AFL) in collaboration with each state Football Associations and independent football league organizers. It is an amateur level league consisting of community clubs, social clubs, professional clubs, and company clubs from their respective states all over Malaysia which compete in their own regional state league which has multiple divisions within it. It consists of 10 social leagues recognized by the AFL that run all around Malaysia.

== Men's system ==
Level	League/Division
1	Malaysia Super League; 14 clubs 2 relegations
2	Malaysia A1 Semi-Pro League; 14 clubs ↑ 2 promotions ↓ 2 relegations
3	Malaysia A2 Amateur League; 21 club, 4 zones ↑ 2 promotions ↓ TBD relegations: Zone 1 Central; 6 clubs / Zone 2 North; 5 clubs / Zone 3 South; 5 clubs / Zone 4 East coast 5 clubs
4–9	Malaysia A3 Community League, Community leagues Parallel leagues, various clubs

=== Development League ===
Age group	League/Division
Under 20	Malaysia President Cup; 11 clubs
Under 18	Malaysia Youth Cup; 14 clubs
Under 14–17	U17-U14 Ministry of Education (MOE) League

The MFL Cup is a reserve league for clubs competing in the Malaysia Super League as well as for footballers from the National Football Development Programme of Malaysia and Mokhtar Dahari Football Academy. It also acts as a bridge for players to get invaluable playing time and opportunities in preparation for the Malaysia Super League. It is the only developmental league administered by the Malaysian Football League, while the rest of the competition is operated by the Football Association of Malaysia, Malaysia Ministry of Education and Maxim Events (Malaysia SupaRimau League).

=== Other youth competitions ===
Level	Youth				Grassroots
1	MSSM Cup (U18); 15 State clubs	KPM-FAM Youth Cup (U17); 18 school clubs	MSSM Cup (U15); 15 clubs	MOE Ministry Cup (U14); 16 school clubs	MSSM Cup (U12); 15 clubs

=== Women's system ===
Level	League/Division
1	National Women's League; 8 clubs

Plan for a National Women's League was first mooted on 2021 as part of the Football Association of Malaysia F30 roadmap to reorganise women's football development with better competition format. The National Women's League were launched with its first edition on 5 August 2023 by the Football Association of Malaysia together with the Ministry of Youth and Sports. With the launched of the Women's League, there is plan to expand the league in the future to follow a similar league structured as Men's League once the Malaysia women football system is fully developed.

== Cup eligibility ==
Being member of a league at a particular level also affects eligibility for cups or single-elimination competitions.

- Malaysia Cup: Level 1 to 2
- Malaysia Challenge Cup: Level 1 to 2
- Malaysia FA Cup: Level 1 to 2
- Sumbangsih Cup is a single match played between the Malaysia Super League and the Malaysia Cup champion

=== Former competitions ===
- Malaysia FAM Cup: Level 3 to 4 (discontinued in 2019)
- MFL Cup was under 23 level competition for reserve squads

== Former structures ==
Before the current system, the Malaysian football league system underwent multiple iterations since its introduction in 1979 and the country's men's football league competition was officially inaugurated in 1982 with the introduction of league trophy for the winners.

=== Amateur league system (1982–1988) ===
A football league competition involving the representative sides of the state football associations was first held in Malaysia in 1979. When it began, it was intended primarily as a qualifying tournament for the final knock-out stages of the Malaysia Cup. It was not until 1982 that a league trophy was introduced to recognise the winners of the preliminary stage as the league champions. Over the years, the league competition has gained an important stature in its own right.

Below is the Malaysian amateur football league system from 1982 to 1988:

Level	Leagues/divisions
1	Liga Malaysia
2	14 States Leagues

=== Semi-Pro league system (1989–1993) ===
In the early days, the Malaysian football league system consisted of an amateur league before the changes that took place in 1989, when it was known as the Liga Semi-Pro (MSPFL) from 1989 to 1993. Initially the only teams allowed to participate in the league were the state FA sides, alongside teams representing the Malaysian Armed Forces and the Royal Malaysian Police, and teams representing the neighbouring countries of Singapore and Brunei. However, the Football Association of Singapore pulled out of the Malaysian League after the 1994 season following a dispute with the Football Association of Malaysia over gate receipts and shifted their focus on establishing their own league while Brunei ended their representative team's involvement in Malaysia at the end of 2005 after winning the Malaysia Cup in 1999, though the country was represented by DPMM FC for a further three seasons in the top two divisions before moving to Singapore for almost a decade and returning back to their national league in 2021.

The inaugural season of MSPFL consisted of nine teams in Division 1 and eight teams in Division 2. Games were played on a home and away basis for about four months roughly between the end of April or early May and the end of August or early September. For the first season three points were awarded for a win, one for a draw and none for a loss, but in subsequent seasons this was changed to a 2, 1 and 0 basis. At the end of the league season the top three placed teams in both divisions received prize money while two were relegated/promoted and a playoff was staged between the eighth placed team in Division 1 and the third placed team in Division 2. The top six teams in Division 1 and top two in Division 2 also proceeded to the quarter-finals of the Malaysia Cup.

In 1992, the FAM created another amateur league for local clubs in Malaysia to compete, which was called the Liga Nasional The league was managed by an outside entity beyond the FAM, called Super Club Sdn. Bhd. Some of the clubs which competed in the league were Hong Chin, Muar FA, PKNK from Kedah, DBKL, PKNS, BSN, LPN, BBMB, Proton, PPC and PKENJ. Unfortunately, the league only ran for a couple of seasons before it folded. Some of the clubs then evolved and joined the higher leagues, such as PKENJ, which later became Johor Darul Ta'zim F.C.

From 1989 to 1993, the Liga Semi-Pro was divided into two levels:

- First Division: Liga Semi-Pro Divisyen 1
- Second Division: Liga Semi-Pro Divisyen 2

Level	Leagues/divisions
1	Liga Semi-Pro Divisyen 1
2	Liga Semi-Pro Divisyen 2
3	14 States League

=== Professional football league system (1994–1997) ===
Between 1994 and 1997, there was no second level league as the top two leagues were combined. 1994 was when Malaysian football turned professional. The MSPFL became the Liga Perdana, which was the de facto top-tier league in Malaysia and with two cup competitions, when the Malaysia FA Cup was founded in 1990; and joined alongside the existing Malaysia Cup. With the formation of the professional football league in 1994, Malaysia FAM Cup was held again as yearly competition after being absent from 1986 to 1990 and 1992 to 1993.

The newly formed professional football league was almost in peril when a bribing and corruption scandal was discovered between 1994 and 1995. 21 players and coaches were sacked, 58 players were suspended and 126 players were questioned over corruption by Malaysian authorities.

- First Division: Liga Perdana

Level	Leagues/divisions
1	Liga Perdana
2	14 States League

In 1997, promotion from the Malaysia FAM Cup to the professional M-League was introduced for the first time. Johor FC and NS Chempaka FC were the first two sides to be promoted that year.

=== Malaysian league system (1998–2003) ===
From 1998 to 2003, the professional football league in Malaysia was divided again into two levels:

Level	Leagues/divisions
1	Liga Perdana 1 (LP1)
2	Liga Perdana 2 (LP2)
3	14 States League

In later years, top Malaysian club teams have also been admitted to the league competition. The exemption for a state FA's team from being relegated was lifted in order to promote a healthy competition in the league.

=== System revamp (2004) ===
The league was revamped to be a fully professional league in 2004 following the decision by the Football Association of Malaysia (FAM) to privatise the league, but it was not fully privatised. As a result, MSL Sendirian Berhad (or MSL Proprietary Limited) was created to oversee the marketing aspects of the league top-tier league at that time.

In 2005, The Malaysia FAM Cup became a third-tier competition and the format of the competition was changed to include a two-group league followed by the traditional knockout format.

Between 2004 and 2006, the professional football leagues in Malaysia was divided into two levels and two groups in the second level:

- First Division: Malaysia Super League
- Second Division: Malaysia Premier League Group A
- Second Division: Malaysia Premier League Group B

Level	Leagues/divisions	
1	Malaysia Super League (MSL); 8 clubs	
2	Malaysia Premier League Group A (MPL Group A); 8 clubs	Malaysia Premier League Group B (MPL Group B); 8 clubs
3	Malaysia FAM Cup (from 2008)	
4	14 States League	

At the end of the season, the top team from each group of the Malaysia Premier League were promoted to the Malaysia Super League. The teams which finished at the bottom of each group were relegated to the Malaysia FAM League. The two group champions also faced off to determine the Malaysia Premier League Champion.

=== System restructure (2007–2022) ===
From 2007 until the present day, the professional football league in Malaysia was in two vertical levels again when the two Malaysia Premier League groups were combined into a single division. For the 2006-07 season, the Malaysia Premier League was reorganised into a single league of 11 teams instead of being a competition involving two separate groups of teams. Below is the Malaysian football league system in 2007:

Level	Leagues/divisions
1	Malaysia Super League (MSL); 11 clubs
2	Malaysia Premier League (MPL); 11 clubs
3	Malaysia FAM League
4	14 States League

In 2008, FAM changed the Malaysia FAM Cup to a league format which served as a third-tier league in the Malaysian football league system and become known as the Malaysia FAM League starting from the 2009 season.

Below is the Malaysian football league system in 2009:

Level	Leagues/divisions
1	Malaysia Super League (MSL); 11 clubs
2	Malaysia Premier League (MPL); 11 clubs
3	Malaysia FAM League
4	14 States Leagues

Below is the Malaysian football league system in 2013 - 2018:

Level	Leagues/divisions
1	Malaysia Super League (MSL); 12 clubs
2	Malaysia Premier League (MPL); 12 clubs
3	Malaysia FAM League; 14 clubs
4	Malaysia M5 League (M5); 194 clubs - 4 states Football League and 10 Social League

Below is the Malaysian football league system in 2019 - 2022:

Level	Leagues/divisions
1	Malaysia Super League (MSL); 12 clubs
2	Malaysia Premier League (MPL); 12 clubs
3	Malaysia M3 League; 20 clubs
4	Malaysia M4 League; 200 clubs - 19 states Football & Social League

== See also ==
- League system, for a list of similar systems in other countries
- History of Malaysian football
- List of Malaysia football champions
