= 1990 Liga Semi-Pro Divisyen 1 =

- Season: 1990
- Champions: Selangor; 2nd Semi-Pro Divisyen One Title; 3rd Liga M Title
- Relegated: Perlis; Sarawak
- Matches: 162

The 1990 Liga Semi-Pro Divisyen 1 was the second season of the Liga Semi-Pro Divisyen 1. A total of 10 teams participated in the season.

Perlis, Perak and Sabah were promoted from 1989 Liga Semi-Pro Divisyen 2 to a now increased total number of teams competing in the league from nine to become ten teams.

Under the new format, only the top six teams in Divisyen 1 and the Divisyen 2 champions and runners-up will be involved in the Malaysia Cup. Malaysia Cup was played from the quarter-final stage, scheduled for November after the league was finished. The Malaysia Cup quarter-final and semi-final matches will be played on a home and away basis.

The season kicked off on 5 May 1990. Selangor ended up the season by winning the title.

== Foreign players ==
Club	Player 1	Player 2	Player 3	Former Player
Johor	(Federal Republic of Yugoslavia) Ervin Boban	(Federal Republic of Yugoslavia) Jure Jeramaz	(Federal Republic of Yugoslavia) Mate Borovac	
Kedah	(Federal Republic of Yugoslavia) Vladimir Illich	(Federal Republic of Yugoslavia) Bratislav Rincic	(Singapore) V. Sundramoorthy	
Kuala Lumpur	(Singapore) Malek Awab	(Singapore) Fandi Ahmad	(Singapore) K. Kannan	
Pahang	(Thailand) Piyapong Pue-on	(Nigeria) Emeka Ezeugo	(Thailand) Attaphol Buspakom	
Perak	(South Korea) Jang Jung	(Myanmar) Aung Naing	(Myanmar) Kyi Lwin	
Perlis	(Thailand) Praduphan Jarunya	(Thailand) Nakul Wattanakeunkaan	(Thailand) Somkiat Fongpet	
Sabah	(Czech Republic) Miroslav Janů	(Czech Republic) Jaroslav Netolička	(Czech Republic) Miroslav Denk	
Sarawak				
Selangor	(Czech Republic) Karel Stromšík	(Federal Republic of Yugoslavia) Zoran Nikolić	(Czech Republic) Pavel Korejcik	
Singapore	(Australia) Alistair Edwards	(Australia) Abbas Saad		

== Teams ==
10 teams competing in the second season of Liga Semi-Pro Divisyen 1.

=== Division 1 ===
Pos	Team	Pld	W	D	L	GF	GA	GD	Pts	Qualification
1	Selangor (C)	18	10	5	3	37	18	+19	35	Champion
2	Singapore	18	11	3	4	35	16	+19	36	
3	Perak	18	10	4	4	20	14	+6	34	
4	Kuala Lumpur	18	7	5	6	29	19	+10	26	
5	Johor	18	8	3	7	31	23	+8	27	
6	Kedah	18	6	7	5	22	18	+4	25	
7	Pahang	18	4	10	4	24	24	0	22	
8	Sabah	18	7	1	10	16	20	−4	22	
9	Perlis	18	4	3	11	16	37	−21	15	Relegation
10	Sarawak	18	1	3	14	17	58	−41	6	Relegation

(C) Champions

=== Top goalscorers ===
Rank	Player	Club	Goals
1	(Croatia) Ervin Boban	Johor	10
2	(Malaysia) Zainal Abidin Hassan	Selangor	9
2	(Malaysia) Dollah Salleh	Selangor	9
2	(England) Alistair Edwards	Singapore	9
5	(Malaysia) Salehan Mat Som	Johor	8
6	(Federal Republic of Yugoslavia) Zoran Nikolić	Selangor	6
6	(Australia) Abbas Saad	Singapore	6
6	(Singapore) Fandi Ahmad	Kuala Lumpur	6
6	(Federal Republic of Yugoslavia) Goran Stanković	Kedah	6
6	(Malaysia) Matlan Marjan	Sabah	6
6	(Singapore) Hasnim Haron	Singapore	6
7	(Malaysia) S. Balachandran	Kuala Lumpur	5
7	(Singapore) K. Kannan	Kuala Lumpur	5
7	(Thailand) Piyapong Pue-on	Pahang	5
7	(Malaysia) Arjunan Anbalagan	Pahang	5

== Champions ==
1990 Liga Semi-Pro Divisyen 1 champion

Selangor
2nd title
