= Zoran Nikolić =

Zoran Nikolić may refer to:

- Zoran Nikolić (basketball) (born 1996), Montenegrin basketball player
- Zoran Nikolić (footballer) (born 1960), Serbian footballer
