= Alistair Edwards =

Australian soccer player and coach (born 1968)

Personal information
- Full name: Alistair Martin Edwards
- Date of birth: 21 June 1968 (age 58)
- Place of birth: Whyalla, South Australia, Australia
- Height: 1.87 m (6 ft 2 in)
- Position: Striker

Team information
- Current team: Johor Darul Ta'zim FC (CEO)

Youth career
- 1986: Kwinana United Soccer Club
- 1987–1988: FFA Centre of Excellence

Senior career*
Years	Team	Apps	(Gls)
1988	Rangers	0	(0)
1989–1990	Sydney Olympic	28	(4)
1989–1990	→ Brighton & Hove Albion (loan)	1	(0)
1990	Singapore FA		
1991–1992	Johor		
1993	Singapore FA		
1994	Selangor		
1994–1996	Millwall	4	(0)
1996	Sydney Olympic	14	(2)
1997–1998	Sarawak		
1998–2004	Perth Glory	93	(24)

International career^{‡}
1987	Australia U-20	3	(1)
1991–1997	Australia	19	(3)
1992–1994	Australia (non – 'A' cap intls.)	3	(2)

Managerial career
- 2004: Australia Women's U-20 (assistant)
- 2004–2005: Western Waves
- 2005–2006: Australia Women's U-20
- 2006–2007: WA NTC
- 2009–2011: Australia U-20 (assistant)
- 2011–2013: Australia U-17
- 2013: Perth Glory (interim)
- 2013: Perth Glory
- 2015: Real Mulia (technical director)
- 2016–2022: Johor Darul Ta'zim (technical director)
- 2022-: Johor Darul Ta'zim (CEO)
Medal record
Representing Australia
Men's Association football
OFC Nations Cup
Winner	1996 Oceania
- * Club domestic league appearances and goals as of 21 March 2013 ‡ National team caps and goals as of 04:46, 23 September 2009 (UTC)

Alistair Martin Edwards (born 21 June 1968) is an Australian former soccer player and coach. A prominent forward, he made a name for himself with National Soccer League clubs Sydney Olympic and Perth Glory. He was also a favourite with Malaysian League teams Sarawak FA, Selangor FA, Singapore FA, Johor FA and Kedah FA in the 1990s. He is currently the chief executive officer at Johor Darul Ta'zim.

== Playing career ==
=== Youth career ===
Born in Whyalla, South Australia to Scottish parents, Edwards' family moved to Kwinana when he was a child, where he joined the local junior team before representing Western Australia in a team that won the 1986 Australian under-18 title. He made a couple of appearances for the state senior side at the age of 17, before attending the Australian Institute of Sport in Canberra.

=== Rangers ===
In 1988, Alistair then had a spell with Rangers in Scotland.

=== Sydney Olympic ===
In 1989, Alistair moved back to Australia to joined Sydney Olympic in which he scored the winning goal in the 1989–90 National Soccer League grand final against Marconi Stallions to help his club to win the title.

==== Loan to Brighton & Hove Albion ====
Alistair performance for Sydney Olympic earns him a loan move to English club, Brighton & Hove Albion for the remainder of the 1989–90 Division Two season.

=== Singapore FA ===
After returning from his loan spell at Brighton & Hove Albion, Alistair joined Singapore FA in 1990 where he form a potent partnership with compatriot, Abbas Saad which resulted to a strong finished in the league and cup, by finishing runners up to Selangor in the Semi-Pro League 1 and runners up in the Cup final in 1990. Alistair also finished as the league top scorer which he won the golden boot with 13 goals.

=== Johor FA ===
After a successful spells at Singapore FA, Alistair joined Johor FA the following year where in his first season, he guided the club to a domestic double winning both the 1991 Liga Semi-Pro Divisyen 1 and the 1991 Malaysia Cup.

=== Return to Singapore FA ===
After two successful season at Johor FA, Alistair returned to Singapore FA in 1993.

=== Selangor FA ===
In 1994, Alistair joined Selangor FA.

=== Millwall ===
Midway in 1994, after four years being in Asia, Alistair was transferred to Millwall ahead of the 1994–95 Division 1 season signing a two years contract.

=== Return to Sydney Olympic ===
Alistair briefly rejoined Sydney Olympic in 1996.

=== Sarawak FA ===
In 1997, Alistair returned to Malaysia to joined with Sarawak FA. In his first season at the club, he helped them to win the 1997 Liga Perdana.

=== Perth Glory ===
In 1998, Alistair returned to Australia to join Perth Glory for whom he played 93 times and scored 24 goals. At the end of 2004, Alistair announced his retirement from football where In all, he made 173 appearances in the National Soccer League for the club.

== International career ==
Alistair played for the Australia national team between 1991 and 1997, scoring 3 goals in 19 matches, and also represented Australia at the 1987 FIFA U-20 World Cup held in Chile.

International goals
No.	Date	Venue	Opponent	Score	Result	Competition
1	29 January 1992	Hindmarsh Stadium, Adelaide, Australia	Sweden	1–0	1–0	Friendly
2	14 August 1992	Gelora Bung Karno Stadium, Jakarta, Indonesia	Indonesia	0–3	0–3	Indonesian Independence Cup
3	22 January 1997	Suncorp Stadium, Brisbane, Australia	South Korea	2–0	2–1	Friendly

== Coaching career ==
=== Australia Women U-20 ===
In 2004, Alistair was the assistant coach at the 2004 FIFA U-19 Women's World Championship in Thailand.

=== Western Waves ===
Alistair was then announced as the head coach of the newly created Australian side, Western Waves but limited resources forced them to dissolvement the following year.

=== Return to Australia Women U-20 ===
Alistair returned to the Australia Women U-20 side and was named the head coach of the Women team at the 2006 AFC U-19 Women's Championship in Malaysia where they qualify for the 2006 FIFA U-20 Women's World Championship held in Russia since joining the AFC.

=== Football Federation of Australia ===
From 2006 to 2009, Edwards became the Football Federation of Australia Development and High Performance Consultant where his main tasks included conducting research in Japan, the Netherlands, France and England on Talent Development and Identification as part of the FFA Development Review and to assist in the development of the FFA National Curriculum. Edwards, along with Paul Okon and Alex Tobin was awarded one of the inaugural FFA Elite Coach Development Scholarships in 2008. As part of his scholarship he spent one month in the Netherlands on attachment with Louis Van Gaal at AZ Alkmaar and Han Westrhoff at Vitesse Arnhem.

=== Australia Women's ===
Upon his return, Alistair took the Matildas to the 2008 AFF Women's Championship in Vietnam where they won the tournament. Edwards is also an AFC/FFA Advanced Licence Coach Instructor and conducts Advanced Pathway coaching courses for the FFA. In 2008, Edwards was invited to Cambodia to conduct an Elite Coach Development Course on behalf of the Australian Sports Commission. In August 2009, Edwards was appointed to the position of FFA Assistant Technical Director working alongside Dutchman Han Berger. His dual role at the FFA included the assistant coach role to the Young Socceroos where he worked alongside Jan Verslijen, the head coach of the AIS, U/17 and U/20 national teams.

=== Perth Glory ===
In February 2013, Alistair was named the interim manager of Perth Glory after previous manager Ian Ferguson was sacked. Edwards managed his former club for the rest of the 2012–13 A-League season taking them from last position on the table to qualify for the A-League finals. Alistair then was appointed as the permanent head coach of Perth on a three-year deal. On 17 December 2013, Edwards was sacked after a falling out with several players and Perth Glory owner Tony Sage. Senior players, including Jacob Burns, were reportedly upset over being left on the bench due to Alistair' insistence on implementing the club's Western Australia focused youth policy, including usage of his two sons, Cameron and Ryan Edwards, at the expense of other players.

=== Real Mulia ===
After working as a football pundit in Singapore, in January 2015, Alistair became the technical director of the Bangi-based team Real Mulia, who play in the 2015 Malaysia's FAM League.

=== Johor Darul Ta'zim ===
In January 2016, Alistair, who was himself a former Johor striker in their historic double-winning team of 1991, was appointed as JDT's Sporting Director Johor Darul Ta'zim is a Malaysian-based football outfit that has enjoyed much success coinciding with Alistair's appointment, although it is mostly attributed to its owner, the Crown Prince of Johor, Tunku Ismail Sultan Ibrahim.

In August 2017, Alistair was reassigned as the club's technical director, responsible for all the developmental teams under the JDT umbrella.

In January 2023, Alistair got promoted to the club chief executive officer while Martín Prest will take on his former role.

== Post-retirement ==
Whilst playing for Perth Glory, Edwards graduated with an MBA from Edith Cowan University and also entered Local Government Politics when he was elected onto the Cockburn City Council from 2002 to 2006.

Since retiring as a player, Edwards has undertaken a number of roles in sport development. He worked as a Sport Consultant at the Western Australian State Government Department of Sport and Recreation from 2002 to 2005 and has since become heavily involved in the development of football in Australia. He commentated A-League games covered by Perth radio station 90.5fm.

=== Pundits ===
In June 2014, Alistair work as a football pundit in Singapore for the 2014 FIFA World Cup with SingTel Mio TV.

In May 2015, Alistair was appointed as the football commentary for Astro Arena until August 2017 where at that time, he was the Sporting Director of Johor Darul Ta'zim.

== Personal life ==
Alistair is married to a Singaporean national where he both son, Ryan Edwards is a professional footballer currently playing for SD Amorebieta in the Segunda División while Cameron Edwards is playing for a semi-professional club, Bayswater City

His son, Ryan was born in Singapore. Despite having been in the country for around 10 days after his birth, he was called up for national service for Singapore on his 18th birthday.

== Honours ==
=== Player ===
'Sydney Olympic

- National Soccer League: 1989–1990

Johor FA

- Malaysia League: 1991
- Malaysia Cup: 1991

Sarawak FA

- Malaysia League: 1997

Australia

- OFC Nations Cup: 1996

=== Individual ===
- Malaysia League Golden Boot: 1990 (playing for Singapore FA) – 13 goals

== Managerial statistics ==
As of 19 November 2013

Team	Nat	From	To	Record				
Team	Nat	From	To	G	W	D	L	Win %
Perth Glory (caretaker)	Australia	11 February 2013	21 March 2013	8	4	1	3	50.00
Perth Glory	Australia	21 March 2013	17 December 2013	11	3	4	4	27.27
Total				19	7	5	7	36.84
