= Liga Semi-Pro Divisyen 2 =

- Founded: 1989; 36 years ago
- Folded: 1993; 32 years ago
- Country: Malaysia
- Other club(s) from: Brunei, Singapore
- Confederation: AFC
- Number of clubs: 8 (from 1990)
- Level on pyramid: 2
- Promotion to: Liga Semi-Pro Divisyen 1
- Domestic cup(s): Piala Malaysia; Piala FA (from 1990)
- Last champions: Selangor (1993)
- Most championships: 5 teams (1 title)
- Broadcaster(s): RTM
- Current: 1993 Liga Semi-Pro Divisyen 2

Liga Semi-Pro Divisyen 2 (English: Semi-Pro League Division 2) was a second-tier semi-pro football league in Malaysia that operated from 1989 until 1993. The league was managed by the Football Association of Malaysia.

== Champions ==
Below is the list of the semi-pro league second division champions from 1989 to 1993.

Year	Champions (number of titles)	Runners-up	Third place
1989	Perlis	Perak	Sabah
1990	Terengganu	Kelantan	Negeri Sembilan
1991	Negeri Sembilan	Sarawak	Penang
1992	Kedah	Penang	Kelantan
1993	Selangor	Singapore	Sabah

== See also ==
- Malaysian League
- Liga Semi-Pro
- Liga Malaysia (1982–1988)
- Liga Perdana (1994–97)
