= Liga Nasional =

- Founded: 1992; 34 years ago
- Folded: 1993; 33 years ago
- Country: Malaysia
- Confederation: AFC
- Divisions: 4
- Level on pyramid: 4

Liga Nasional (English: National League or Malaysia National League) was an amateur football league in Malaysia. It was established in 1992 as amateur competition for the football club to compete in Malaysian football league system.

The league only ran for one season before folding the following year.

== History ==
=== Founding ===
A football league competition involving the representative sides of the state football association was first held in Malaysia in 1979. When it began, it was intended primarily as a qualifying tournament for the final knock-out stages of the Malaysia Cup. It was not until 1982 that a League Cup was introduced to recognise the winners of the preliminary stage as the league champions. Over the years, the league competition has gained important stature in its own right.

Initially the only teams allowed to participate in the league were the state FA's sides, teams representing the Military of Malaysia, the Royal Malaysian Police, and teams representing the neighbouring countries of Singapore and Brunei (though the Football Association of Singapore pulled out of the Malaysian League after the 1994 season following a dispute with the Football Association of Malaysia over gate receipts, and has not been involved since).

In 1992, FAM created another amateur league for local clubs in Malaysia to compete in, called the National League Liga Nasional in Malay) The league was managed by FAM outside entity, Super Club Sdn. Bhd. Some of the clubs which compete in the league are Hong Chin, Muar FA, PKNK from Kedah, DBKL, PKNS, BSN, LPN, BBMB, Proton, PPC and PKENJ. Unfortunately, the league only ran for a one season before it folded. Some of the clubs were then evolved and joined the main league, such as PKENJ, which became JCorp and now as Johor Darul Ta'zim.

=== Demise ===
The league only ran for one season before folding the following year.

== Teams ==
Below is the list of some teams competing in the first and only season of Liga Nasional.

- (Selangor) Hong Chin
- (Johor) Muar
- (Kedah) PKNK
- (Kuala Lumpur) DBKL
- (Selangor) PKNS
- (Malaysia) BSN
- (Malaysia) LPN
- (Malaysia) BBMB
- (Malaysia) Proton
- (Malaysia) PPC
- (Johor) PKENJ
