= Liga Semi-Pro Divisyen 1 =

- Founded: 1989; 36 years ago
- Folded: 1993; 32 years ago
- Country: Malaysia
- Other club(s) from: Singapore
- Confederation: AFC
- Number of clubs: 10 (from 1990)
- Level on pyramid: 1
- Relegation to: Liga Semi-Pro Divisyen 2
- Domestic cup(s): Piala Malaysia; Piala FA (from 1990)
- Last champions: Kedah (1993)
- Most championships: Selangor (2 titles)
- Broadcaster(s): RTM
- Current: 1993 Liga Semi-Pro Divisyen 1

Liga Semi-Pro Divisyen 1 (English: Semi-Pro League Division 1) was the top-tier semi-pro football league in Malaysia that operated from 1989 until 1993. The league was managed by the Football Association of Malaysia.

== Champions ==
Below is the list of the semi-pro league top division champions from 1989 to 1993.

| Year | Champions (number of titles) | Runners-up | Third place | Leading goalscorer | Goals |
|---|---|---|---|---|---|
| 1989 | Selangor | Kuala Lumpur | Kedah | Zainal Abidin Hassan (Selangor) | 12 |
| 1990 | Selangor (2) | Singapore | Perak | Alistair Edwards (Singapore) | 13 |
| 1991 | Johor | Pahang | Perak | Abbas Saad (Johor) | 11 |
| 1992 | Pahang | Terengganu | Negeri Sembilan | Zainal Abidin Hassan (Pahang) | 12 |
| 1993 | Kedah | Sarawak | Perak | Mohd Hashim Mustapha (Kelantan) | 13 |

== See also ==
- Malaysian League
- Liga Malaysia (1982–1988)
- Liga Semi-Pro
- Liga Perdana (1994–97)
