= 2000 Liga Perdana 1 =

- Season: 2000
- Champions: Selangor; 1st title
- Relegated: Sabah; Brunei
- Matches played: 132

The 2000 Liga Perdana 1 was the third season of the Liga Perdana 1. A total of 12 teams participated in the season.

Selangor, Johor and Perlis were promoted from the Liga Perdana 2. The season kicked off on April 15, 2000.

== Teams ==
- Selangor (2000 Liga Perdana 1 champions)
- Penang
- Perak
- Terengganu
- Sarawak
- Negeri Sembilan
- Pahang
- Kuala Lumpur
- Perlis
- Johor
- Sabah (Relegated to Liga Perdana 2)
- Brunei (Relegated to Liga Perdana 2)

== League table ==
Pos	Team	Pld	W	D	L	GF	GA	GD	Pts	Qualification or relegation
1	Selangor	22	14	3	5	41	25	+16	45	Champion
2	Penang	22	12	7	3	35	15	+20	43	
3	Perak	22	12	5	5	35	18	+17	41	
4	Terengganu	22	9	8	5	29	23	+6	35	
5	Sarawak	22	10	5	7	28	22	+6	35	
6	Negeri Sembilan	22	10	3	9	32	26	+6	33	
7	Pahang	22	8	7	7	41	28	+13	31	
8	Kuala Lumpur	22	7	8	7	27	32	−5	29	
9	Perlis	22	6	7	9	24	27	−3	25	
10	Johor	22	6	2	14	27	50	−23	20	
11	Sabah	22	4	4	14	22	41	−19	16	Relegated to Liga Perdana 2
12	Brunei	22	2	5	15	19	53	−34	11	Relegated to Liga Perdana 2

== Champions ==
2000 Liga Perdana 1 champions
Selangor
1st title
