= 1997 Liga Perdana =

- Season: 1997
- Champions: Sarawak; 1st title
- Relegated: Johor; Kelantan; Malacca; Terengganu
- Matches played: 210

The 1997 Liga Perdana season was the fourth and final season of the top-tier league, Liga Perdana (1994–97). A total of 15 teams participated in the season, 14 from Malaysia and one from Brunei. The season kicked off on 5 April 1997.

== Teams ==
- Sarawak (1997 Liga Perdana champions)
- Kedah
- Sabah
- Selangor
- Perlis
- Negeri Sembilan
- Perak
- Kuala Lumpur
- Pahang
- (Penang) Pulau Pinang
- Kelantan
- Terengganu
- Johor
- Malacca
- Brunei

== Champions ==
1997 Liga Perdana (1994–97) champions
Sarawak
1st title
