= 1992 Liga Semi-Pro Divisyen 2 =

- Season: 1992
- Champions: (Kedah) Kedah; 1st Second Division title
- Promoted: Kedah; Pulau Pinang; Kelantan
- Matches: 112

The 1992 Liga Semi-Pro Divisyen 2 season is the fourth season of Liga Semi-Pro Divisyen 2. A total of eight teams participated in the season.

Kedah and Kelantan were relegated from 1991 Liga Semi-Pro Divisyen 1.

Under the new format, only the top six teams in Divisyen 1 and the Divisyen 2 champions and runners-up will be involved in the Malaysia Cup. Malaysia Cup was played from the quarter-final stage, scheduled for November after the league was finished. The Malaysia Cup quarter-final and semi-final matches will be played on a home and away basis.

The season kicked off on 10 May 1992. Kedah ended up the season by winning the title. Kedah and Pulau Pinang were automatically promoted to the first division alongside Kelantan which won the promotion play-off against Singapura.

== Teams ==
Eight teams competing in the fourth season of Liga Semi-Pro Divisyen 2.

- Kedah (1992 Liga Semi-Pro Divisyen 2 champions) (Promoted to 1993 Liga Semi-Pro Divisyen 1)
- (Penang) Pulau Pinang (1992 Liga Semi-Pro Divisyen 2 promotion) (Promoted to 1993 Liga Semi-Pro Divisyen 1)
- Kelantan (1992 MSPFL promotion play-off) (Promoted to 1993 Liga Semi-Pro Divisyen 1)
- (Malaysia) PDRM
- Perlis
- (Malaysia) ATM
- Brunei
- (Malacca) Melaka

== League table ==
Pos	Team	Pld	W	D	L	GF	GA	GD	Pts	Qualification or relegation
1	Kedah (C)	14	11	3	0	33	8	+25	36	Promoted to Liga Semi-Pro Divisyen 1
2	(Penang) Pulau Pinang (P)	14	8	4	2	29	13	+16	28	Promoted to Liga Semi-Pro Divisyen 1
3	Kelantan (P)	14	5	4	5	27	18	+9	19	Promoted to Liga Semi-Pro Divisyen 1
4	(Malaysia) PDRM	14	5	3	6	22	24	−2	18	
5	Perlis	14	4	4	6	16	19	−3	16	
6	(Malaysia) ATM	14	2	6	6	13	25	−12	12	
7	Brunei	14	3	4	7	15	32	−17	13	
8	(Malacca) Melaka	14	2	4	8	13	29	−16	10	

(C) Champions; (P) Promoted

== Champions ==
1992 Liga Semi-Pro Divisyen 2 champion

1st title
