= 1989 Liga Semi-Pro Divisyen 1 =

- Season: 1989
- Champions: Selangor; 1st title
- Relegated: Penang; Kelantan
- Matches: 144

The 1989 Liga Semi-Pro Divisyen 1 was the inaugural season of the Liga Semi-Pro Divisyen 1. A total of nine teams participated in the season.

The teams were based from nine best performing teams from 1988 Malaysian League season.

Under the new format, only the top six teams in Divisyen 1 and the Divisyen 2 champions and runners-up will be involved in the Malaysia Cup. Malaysia Cup was played from the quarter-final stage, scheduled for November after the league was finished. The Malaysia Cup quarter-final and semi-final matches will be played on a home and away basis.

The season kicked off on 1 July 1989. Selangor ended up the season by winning the title.

== Foreign players ==
Club	Player 1	Player 2	Player 3	Former Player
Johor	(Federal Republic of Yugoslavia) Ervin Boban	(Federal Republic of Yugoslavia) Jure Jeramaz	(Federal Republic of Yugoslavia) Mate Borovac	
Kedah	(Sweden) Eric Peter Amsler	(Federal Republic of Yugoslavia) Bratislav Rincic	(Singapore) V. Sundramoorthy	
Kelantan	(Singapore) Razali Rashid	(Singapore) Ahmad Ibrahim Maksudi		(Indonesia) Robby Darwis
Kuala Lumpur	(Singapore) Malek Awab	(Singapore) Fandi Ahmad	(Singapore) K. Kannan	
Pahang	(Thailand) Piyapong Pue-on	(Thailand) Vithoon Kijmongkolsak	(Thailand) Attaphol Buspakom	
Penang	(Switzerland) Beat Zimmerman			
Sarawak				
Selangor	(Czech Republic) Karel Stromšík	(Federal Republic of Yugoslavia) Zoran Nikolić		(Czech Republic) Kresimir Bozic
Singapore	(Federal Republic of Yugoslavia) Boris Lucic	(Federal Republic of Yugoslavia) Joško Španjić		

== Teams ==
Nine teams competing in the first season of Liga Semi-Pro Divisyen 1.

- Selangor (Liga Semi-Pro Divisyen 1 champions)
- Kuala Lumpur
- Kedah
- Pahang
- Johor
- Sarawak
- (Singapore) Singapura
- (Penang) Pulau Pinang (Relegated to Liga Semi-Pro Divisyen 2)
- Kelantan (Relegated to Liga Semi-Pro Divisyen 2)

=== Divisyen 1 ===
Pos	Team	Pld	W	D	L	GF	GA	GD	Pts	Qualification or relegation
1	Selangor (C)	16	10	3	3	26	10	+16	33	
2	Kuala Lumpur	16	10	2	4	34	16	+18	32	
3	Kedah	16	8	4	4	22	16	+6	28	
4	Pahang	16	8	3	5	26	17	+9	27	
5	Johor	16	7	4	5	27	21	+6	25	
6	Sarawak	16	6	3	7	18	42	−24	21	
7	Singapura	16	3	4	9	22	25	−3	13	
8	Pulau Pinang (R)	16	3	4	9	19	30	−11	13	Relegated to 1990 Liga Divisyen 2
9	Kelantan (R)	16	2	3	11	8	26	−18	9	Relegated to 1990 Liga Divisyen 2

(C) Champions; (R) Relegated

=== Top scorers ===
Rank	Player	Club	Goals
1	(Malaysia) Zainal Abidin Hassan	Selangor FA	11
2	(Malaysia) Salehan Mohammad Som	Johor FA	9
3	(Thailand) Piyapong Pue-on	Pahang FA	8
4	(Malaysia) Lim Teong Kim	Kuala Lumpur FA	7
4	(Singapore) K. Kannan	Kuala Lumpur FA	7
4	(Federal Republic of Yugoslavia) Ervin Boban	Johor FA	7
5	(Malaysia) Subadron Aziz	Kuala Lumpur FA	6
5	(Malaysia) Aziz Azizan	Penang FA	6
5	(Malaysia) Hussin Jafar	Kedah FA	6

== Champions ==
1989 Liga Semi-Pro Divisyen 1 champion

Selangor
1st title
