= Selangor F.C. =

Professional football club based in Shah Alam, Selangor, Malaysia

Selangor
- Full name: Selangor Football Club
- Nicknames: Gergasi Merah (The Red Giants); Merah Kuning (The Red Yellows)
- Short name: SEL
- Founded: 1906; 120 years ago as Selangor SFA (Unofficial); 1921; 105 years ago (Official Established); 22 February 1936; 90 years ago, as Selangor FA; 2 October 2020; 6 years ago, as Selangor Football Club
- Ground: Shah Alam Stadium (Petaling Jaya Stadium)
- Capacity: 80,372 (10,661)
- Owner: Red Giants FC Sdn. Bhd.
- Chairman: Tengku Amir Shah
- Head coach: Kim Pan-gon
- League: Malaysia Super League
- 2025–26: Malaysia Super League, 3rd of 13
- Website: selangorfc.com
Home colours	Away colours

Selangor Football Club (Malay: Kelab Bola Sepak Selangor) is a professional football club based in Shah Alam, Selangor, Malaysia. Competing in the Malaysia Super League, the country's top tier of Malaysian football, the club is widely regarded as one of the most iconic and successful teams in Malaysian Football history. Nicknamed The Red Giants, Selangor was officially founded in 1921 as Selangor FA by the Football Association of Selangor (FAS). In 2020, the club officially made its privatization and renamed as Selangor Football Club. While its historic home, Shah Alam Stadium undergoes major redevelopment, Selangor currently plays its home matches at Petaling Jaya Stadium.

Selangor is the most successful and decorated club in Malaysia in terms of overall honours won, with 52 top-qualifying trophies and 61 trophies collectively. Domestically, Selangor had won a total of 6 Malaysia top division league titles which include 2 Malaysia Super League titles, 1 Premier League 1 title, 2 Semi-Pro League Division 1 titles and 1 Malaysian League title. In cup competitions, the club have a record of 33 Malaysia Cup, a joint-best 5 Malaysia FA Cup and a record of 8 Malaysia Charity Shield. In addition, the club have also won 2 second-division titles, 1 Malaysia Premier League title and 1 Semi-Pro League Division 2 title and between 1951 and 1973, 7 Malaysia FAM Cups where the Malaysia FAM Cup acted as a secondary knockout cup competition between state teams after the Malaysia Cup.

Beyond its domestic dominance, Selangor has played a pioneering role in Malaysian football on the continental stage. It became the first Malaysian club to compete in the Asian Champion Club Tournament, finishing as runner-up in the inaugural edition in 1967, which was later rebranded as the AFC Champions League in 2002. The club was also the first in Malaysian football history to achieve a league and cup double by winning the Malaysian Amateur League and Malaysia Cup in 1984.

Selangor gave rise to many Malaysian football stars who brought success to both club and country such as Mokhtar Dahari, R. Arumugam, Abdul Ghani Minhat, Wong Choon Wah, Santokh Singh, Soh Chin Aun, Zainal Abidin Hassan, Azman Adnan, Rusdi Suparman, Amri Yahyah, and Safee Sali among others The club remains as one of the best supported clubs in Malaysia. It holds several rivalries, most notably with Singapore FA and Kuala Lumpur City.

== History ==
=== Beginnings and breakthrough (1906–1936) ===
A Selangor state football association was founded on 6 May 1906 to establish and manage an internal state league, called the Selangor Association Football League (SAFL). SAFL was established by five founders, namely the Selangor Recreation Club, the Royal Selangor Club, the Selangor YMCA, and the Victoria Institution.

This establishment was the starting point for the organized football league system in the state of Selangor and laid the foundation for the development of modern football in this state. The first cup competition was sponsored by the British Resident of Selangor, R.G. Watson. There were also reports that the association was led by British Residents at that time.

On 20 August 1921, the Selangor made its first appearance in an official competitive competition at the national level through a Malaya Cup match against the Penang team. This date marked the birth of the Selangor's competitive identity on the official national stage.

On 3 September 1922, the Selangor won its first championship in the Malaya Cup competition. During this period, Selangor won their first ever piece of silverware in the form of the Malaya Cup in 1922, in a 3–2 win over Singapore FA (a rivalry that would come to define Malaysian football in future years) and going on to win the Malaya Cup a further five times in 1927, 1928, 1929, 1935 and 1936.

Due to an internal conflict, some officials left the organization in 1926 and founded the Selangor Football Association (SFA), a new organization. The dispute between the SAFL and the SFA continued for almost ten years before the two sides negotiated back on a deal for the betterment of the future of football in the state of Selangor. Finally, the two football entities officially merged on 22 February 1936, under the name of the Football Association of Selangor (FAS) (Malay: Persatuan Bola Sepak Selangor) and forming Selangor FA to represent the state of Selangor.

==== MAHA Stadium ====
The proposal to build a stadium that can accommodate 5,000 spectators was first voiced in 1927, and from the very beginning the venue was built in collaboration between MAHA (Malayan Agri-Horticultural Association) and the Selangor football association. Initially three sites were nominated for the venue; at Gaol Road (now Jalan Hang Tuah), at the intersection of Jalan Bukit Bintang and Circular Road (now Jalan Tun Razak, possibly on the site of where Prince Court Medical Centre now stands), and at Jalan Pudu. The site chosen was ultimately at the intersection of Circular Road and Jalan Ampang, and according to press reports of the time, it began construction in 1928 and was completed the following year. The specific location of the stadium is not known, it is only said in press reports to be behind a police station at this intersection, which is the current Jalan Tun Razak police station.

When it was completed, MAHA was sued by the surrounding residents because it was said that the football matches held there disturbed public order. Although the suit was in favor of the stadium owners, Selangor only began to make the stadium their official ‘home ground’ in 1931, in the Malaya Cup against Penang on July 18, a match that ended in a 5–3 victory for Selangor. The squad played a total of 20 times at this stadium between 1931 and 1940, and won 14 times. The eight finals of the Malaya Cup were held here with Selangor being finalists four times. However, the club won only one final, in a 2–0 win over Singapore FA in 1935. Their last match here was nine years later, against Kedah in the Malaya Cup on 20 July 1940.

In the aftermath of the Japanese occupation during World War II from 1941 to 1945, the MAHA Stadium was damaged which made it unusable and was subsequently destroyed. The current site of the former MAHA Stadium has now become an area for car dealers, with a shopping mall right next to the Jalan Tun Razak police station, also included are residential and embassy areas. In this neighborhood there are several fields and open spaces owned by Kelab Aman, SJKC Chung Hwa (P), and a cricket association.

=== Between World War II and Independence (1937–1960) ===
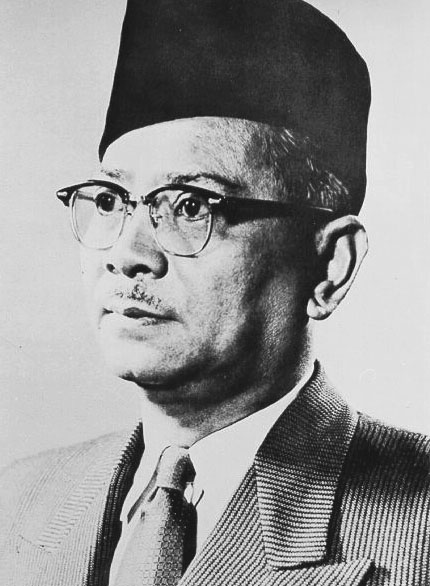
Tunku Abdul Rahman - FAS' first Malaysian president appointed in 1951

The outbreak of World War II slowed down FAS' efforts to develop domestic football. The effort was started aggressively as soon as the war ended. Efforts to upgrade state football continued with the association laying out plans to construct a new football stadium for the state team. The state team prior to the war played at MAHA Stadium in Jalan Ampang and in the intervening years at Selangor Field Club (now Dataran Merdeka), the team's new home ground clearly required a stadium in line with the association's direction. The association management met the Mayor of Kuala Lumpur several times for permission to construct the stadium but a solution couldn't be found. The impasse meant that Selangor's home stadium plan had to be put on hold.

However, the appointment of Tunku Abdul Rahman Putra Al-Haj as the first official FAS president (who also held the presidency of the Football Association of Malaysia at that time) was a right move for the association. After becoming Prime Minister of the newly independent Federation of Malaya in 1957, Tunku Abdul Rahman pioneered the stadium construction business and ordered the construction of Stadium Merdeka to celebrate the country's independence as well as being Selangor's official new home stadium. Stadium Merdeka also served as the occasional home ground of the Malaysia national football team as well as the staging of international sporting events.

After 1951, Tunku Abdul Rahman vacated the presidency of the FAS. He was succeeded by the Independent MP for Bangsar (now known as Bangsar) constituency and also a teacher by profession, S.C.E. Singam, who became the second official FAS president until 1953, where he was succeeded by K. Sundram. Between 1951 and 1960, the club won two Malaysia Cups in 1956 and 1959, finishing as runners-up in 1957 and 2 Malaysia FAM Cups in 1953 and 1960, finishing as runners-up in 1952 and 1955.

=== Era of Harun Idris' leadership (1961–1983) ===
Dato' Seri Harun Idris is synonymous with football in Selangor and Malaysia in the 1960s to the early 1980s. He ran as president of the FAS for 21 years from 1961 to 1983. During his leadership, Selangor won 15 Malaysia Cups as well as doing a lot of positive changes for the association. The club was originally headquartered at the MCA building in Jalan Ampang before the construction of Wisma FAS in 1973 at Merdeka Stadium under the president's (who was also the Chief Minister of Selangor at the time) and club manager Hamzah Abu Samah's efforts.

In that time, the club won the Malaysia Cup 15 times (in 1961, 1962, 1963, 1966, 1968, 1969, 1971, 1972, 1973, 1975, 1976, 1978, 1979, 1981 and 1982 as well as the Malaysia FAM Cup 5 times in 1961, 1962, 1966, 1968 and 1972).

=== Ahmad Razali Mohd Ali era (1983–1989) ===
Tan Sri Ahmad Razali Mohd Ali, who was the Chief Minister of Selangor at that time became FAS President from 1983 to 1989. In the 1984 Malaysian League season, under his leadership Selangor won their first ever Malaysian top division football league title, a league that was first introduced with a winner's trophy in 1982. Additionally, Selangor also won the Malaysia Cup in 1984 to achieve a historic league and cup double, a first in the history of Malaysian football.

The club also won the Malaysia Cup in 1986 where legends Mokhtar Dahari and R. Arumugam made their final appearances. In 1989, the club also won the rebranded Semi-Pro League Division 1 that replaced the Malaysian League as the country's top-flight football league. It was the final trophy under Ahmad Razali's leadership.

=== All-new stadium and Wisma FAS (1990–1995) ===
After a series of successes for the club, the FAS decided to end the club's tenure at Stadium Merdeka to fulfill the ambitions of the club. As a result, an all-new stadium development had to be approved and built. Finally, on January 1, 1990, a groundbreaking ceremony for the new stadium was held in Shah Alam. Built primarily for the Commonwealth Games in 1998, the ground could accommodate up to 80,000 spectators at a time. Its structure is the longest free gate in the world in that era. It also become one of the major landmarks in Shah Alam, due to its impressive size and design. The stadium has been the home of Selangor since it opened in July 1994. FAS also moved to their new headquarters in Kelana Jaya, which was known as Wisma FAS in the mid-1990s. In that time, the club won the Semi-Pro League Division 1 twice in 1989 and 1990, and won the Semi-Pro League Division 2 in 1993 after suffering relegation the year before, as well as a Malaysia FA Cup triumph in 1991, a Malaysia Cup triumph in 1995 and a Malaysia Charity Shield triumph in 1990.

=== 17 trophies collected (1996–2010) ===
The period between 1996 and 2010 was Selangor's most successful, despite a relegation in between. In the 1996 season, with Ken Worden as a coach, they won the Malaysia Charity Shield and the Malaysia Cup. The following season, Steve Wicks guided the club to success with a trifecta of trophies. Under the guidance of coach K. Rajagopal from 1999 to 2000, Selangor won the 2000 Premier League 1 title, which was the top-flight league in Malaysia and secured their fourth league title. Ken Worden was appointed again and won the Malaysia Charity Shield and the Malaysia Cup in the 2002 season.

In the 2004 season, the club was relegated to the brand new second-division, the Malaysia Premier League. Dollah Salleh was appointed as coach and won the 2005 Malaysia Premier League, the Malaysia FA Cup and the Malaysia Cup. However, in the following seasons the club did not win any trophies as this was attributed back to the poor management.

In the 2009 season, K. Devan was appointed. He won the Malaysia Super League in 2009 and 2010, the 2009 Malaysia FA Cup and the Malaysia Charity Shield in 2009 and 2010, with the 2009 triumph being the club's second ever double winning season after the 1984 success.

=== Period of decline (2011–2017) ===
The club went through what is considered to be the worst period in their history, with 7 different coaches. However, in 2015 the club won the Malaysia Cup for a record 33rd time under the management of former player Mehmet Duraković. That tally is still unsurpassed and the club remains as one of the most successful in the competition's history. Affairs off the pitch were not great as management problems during the tenure of Mohamed Azmin Ali caused Selangor to vacate their home ground and the internal conflict between management.

=== Tengku Amir Shah takeover (2018–present) ===
In July 2018, the Crown Prince of Selangor, Tengku Amir Shah (RMS) was appointed as the new president of FAS. He took over the seat left by Datuk Seri Subahan Kamal. In July 2019, they moved to a new 400,000-square facility called Selangor FA Training Centre which had a three-year lease from the Government of Selangor. The facility also sees the administrative headquarters of the Football Association of Selangor, club administration office, indoor training, pitches, gym, lounge and physio treatment area.

On 9 October 2019, as part of the privatization effort, FAS decided to only manage the U17, U14, U12 and women's squad. The club also took over PKNS, while the existing Selangor U20 and Selangor U18 squads were known as Selangor III & IV. On 2 October 2020, Selangor announced that their privatisation submission has been approved by the Football Association of Malaysia (FAM). The club revealed that it will be known as, Selangor Football Club, starting from 1 December. The football team was managed by a newly established entity, Red Giants Football Club Sdn Bhd. Under the new structure, Selangor gradually returned to contention for domestic honours. In 2022, the club reached the Malaysia Cup final but lost 2–1 to Johor Darul Ta'zim. The following year, Selangor finished as runners-up in the 2022 Malaysia Super League, their highest league finish since 2010, and reached the semi-finals of the FA Cup

On 5 May 2024, Selangor forward Faisal Halim suffered an acid attack in front of a shopping mall, which resulted in Faisal suffering fourth-degree burns and had to undergo multiple surgeries. Selangor was due to face Johor Darul Ta'zim but chose to withdraw from the match. Sultan Sharafuddin Idris Shah supported Selangor's withdrawal while criticising MSL's refusal to postpone the match.

==== Challenge cup triumph and continental return (2024–2026) ====
2024 Malaysia FA Cup final between Selangor and Johor Darul Ta'zim at the Bukit Jalil National Stadium.

During the 2024–25 season, Selangor finished second in the Malaysia Super League and reached the FA Cup final, where they lost 6–1 to Johor Darul Ta'zim. However, the club won the 2024–25 MFL Challenge Cup for the first time after defeating PDRM 7–0 on aggregate in the final, securing their first major domestic trophy since winning the Malaysia Cup in 2015. On 20 June 2024, it was confirmed that Selangor will participate in the 2024–25 AFC Champions League Two, making their return to the AFC tournament since the 2016 AFC Cup. The club was then drawn in Group H alongside Korean club Jeonbuk Hyundai Motors, Thailand club Muangthong United and Philippines club Dynamic Herb Cebu. Selangor recorded three wins, one draw and two defeats, including a notable 2–1 victory over Jeonbuk Hyundai Motors and a 4–0 win against Dynamic Herb Cebu away from home. However, Selangor finished third in the group and did not advance to the knockout stage.

In the 2025–26 season, Selangor continued to challenge for domestic honours, finishing second in the league and reaching the semi-finals of both the FA Cup and Malaysia Cup. The club also competed in the ASEAN Club Championship and the AFC Champions League Two. In the AFC Champions League Two, Selangor were drawn in Group G with Thailand club Bangkok United, Singaporean club Lion City Sailors and Indonesian club Persib Bandung. Selangor eventually struggled in the competition, recording one draw and five defeats, and finished bottom of the group. Selangor also made their debut in the ASEAN Club Championship, competing in Group A. They progressed to the semi-finals, where they defeated Vietnamese club Nam Định 4–1 on aggregate, winning 2–1 in the first leg and 2–0 in the second. Selangor subsequently reached the final against defending champions Buriram United of Thailand, but lost 3–1 on aggregate after defeats in both legs, finishing as runners-up in the competition.

== Team image ==
Club crest since July 2026, honoring the year the original Selangor state team played its first ever competitive match.

Selangor badge from the 1970s until 2020

=== Crest and colours ===
The original emblem that was first created in 1936 as a result of the merger between the Selangor Football Association (SFA) and Selangor Association Football League (SAFL), containing the symbol of wildebeest. In the early 1970s, the FA Selangor symbol was replaced with the flag and coat of arms of Selangor and the lettering was written in Malay. The colour characteristics symbolize Bravery for red and Royalty for yellow. Both of these colors are linked to the state flag which follows the identity of Selangor. The logo is then completed by featuring the state's blazon on the top of it.

In July 2026, Selangor updated its crest to commemorate its historic role in the founding of the Malaya Cup and the club's inaugural match against Penang on 20 August 1921 in Kuala Lumpur. The new design replaced "1936" with "1921", honoring the year the original Selangor state team was established to compete in Malaya's first national football tournament. The year 1936 had previously signified the founding of the Football Association of Selangor, which managed the team until 2020. The remainder of the crest remained unchanged.

=== Supporters ===
Since their inception in 1921, Selangor have developed a dedicated fanbase following Ultrasel.

Merah Kuning - Selangor football anthem

Merah kuning lambang kebanggaan,
Selangor merancang kejayaan,
Gemuruh sorakan menggegarkan,
Cabaran disambut dengan kesungguhan.

Kecemerlangan, kecemerlangan...
Kecemerlangan jadi kenyataan...

Merah kuning keberanian,
Menempuh segala halangan.
Sekali melangkah buktikan kemampuan...

Merah kuning keberanian,
Menempuh segala halangan...
Sekali melangkah buktikan kemampuan,
Selangor Darul Ehsan

Selangor Darul Ehsan

— "Merah Kuning" lyrics, Anuar Razak

Ultrasel Curva's most frequently sung song are the rendition of Red Yellow (Malay: Merah Kuning), "Kami Datang Lagi", "Kau & Aku Selamanya", "Selangor Sampai Mati", “Ale ale, Selangor ale", "Kaulah Kebanggaan" and "Tentang Perjuangan", "Come on Selangor", "Inilah Barisan Kita", "You're Obsessed", "Slaughter your enemy", among many.

Selangor has collaborated with several local artists to produce songs such as in 1997 with KRU - Viva Selangor. On 28 May 2022, Selangor collaborated with Altimet in the production of the third jersey and produced a special album Langgam Gendang Perang, as a sign of Altimet's support for his beloved team.

=== Rivalries ===
Selangor has a historical derby with Perak and earlier Singapore FA known as the Malayan El Clasico, while matches with Kuala Lumpur are known as the Klang Valley Derby.

==== Singapore FA ====
The rivalry with Singapore was a football rivalry that occurred between 1921 and 1994. It was the oldest football derby in Malaysia. The rivalry arose from the numerous times the two clubs have battled for the Malaysia Cup title. This fixture has become known as one of the finest Malaysia Cup match-ups in history. The rivalry ended in 1994 after the Football Association of Singapore decided to pull out its representative side in the Malaysian football league system. The last meeting between the two teams was on 10 December 1994, which Singapore narrowly won 3–2 on aggregate, before going on to win the Malaysia Cup. In terms of head-to-head Singapore edge out Selangor with 22 to 19.

==== Kuala Lumpur City ====
The rivalry occurred due to the two states' geographical locations. Selangor enjoyed success with triumphs in the league in 1984 and the cup in 1981, 1982, 1984 and 1986, before Kuala Lumpur became a force with three consecutive Malaysia Cup triumphs from 1987 to 1989, winning the league in 1986.

The rekindled rivalry came to a head in the 2021 Malaysia Cup quarter-finals when the renamed Kuala Lumpur City beat Selangor which resulted in a pitch invasion from the Kuala Lumpur supporters. Kuala Lumpur then went on to win the 2021 Malaysia Cup.

=== Social media, esports ===
The online presence is believed to be one of the strongest amongst the clubs in Malaysia. On 19 January 2023, Selangor has made history by becoming the first football team in Malaysia to have their own Mobile Legends: Bang Bang (MLBB) team (known as the Yoodo Red Giants) to compete in the Mobile Legends: Bang Bang Professional League Malaysia (MPL-Malaysia) for the 11th season. The announcement ceremony was held at the Selangor FC Training Center, Shah Alam. As Selangor Red Giants, the team won MPL-Malaysia Season 13 in spring 2024 with an unbeaten season. They then won MSC 2024, defeating Falcons AP Bren in 7 games at the Grand Final. The MSC win gave Selangor US$1,000,000 in prize money.

=== Ownership and finances ===
The holding company of Selangor football club, Red Giants FC Sdn. Bhd. is a private limited company, with approximately RM10 million in shares issued by the state government of Selangor as paid-up capital. The club was privatized at the end of the 2019 season. Among the shareholders for management are the current Crown Prince of Selangor, Tengku Amir Shah as majority shareholder, Perbadanan Kemajuan Negeri Selangor (PKNS), Menteri Besar Incorporated (MBI) and the Football Association of Selangor (FAS).

== Stadium ==
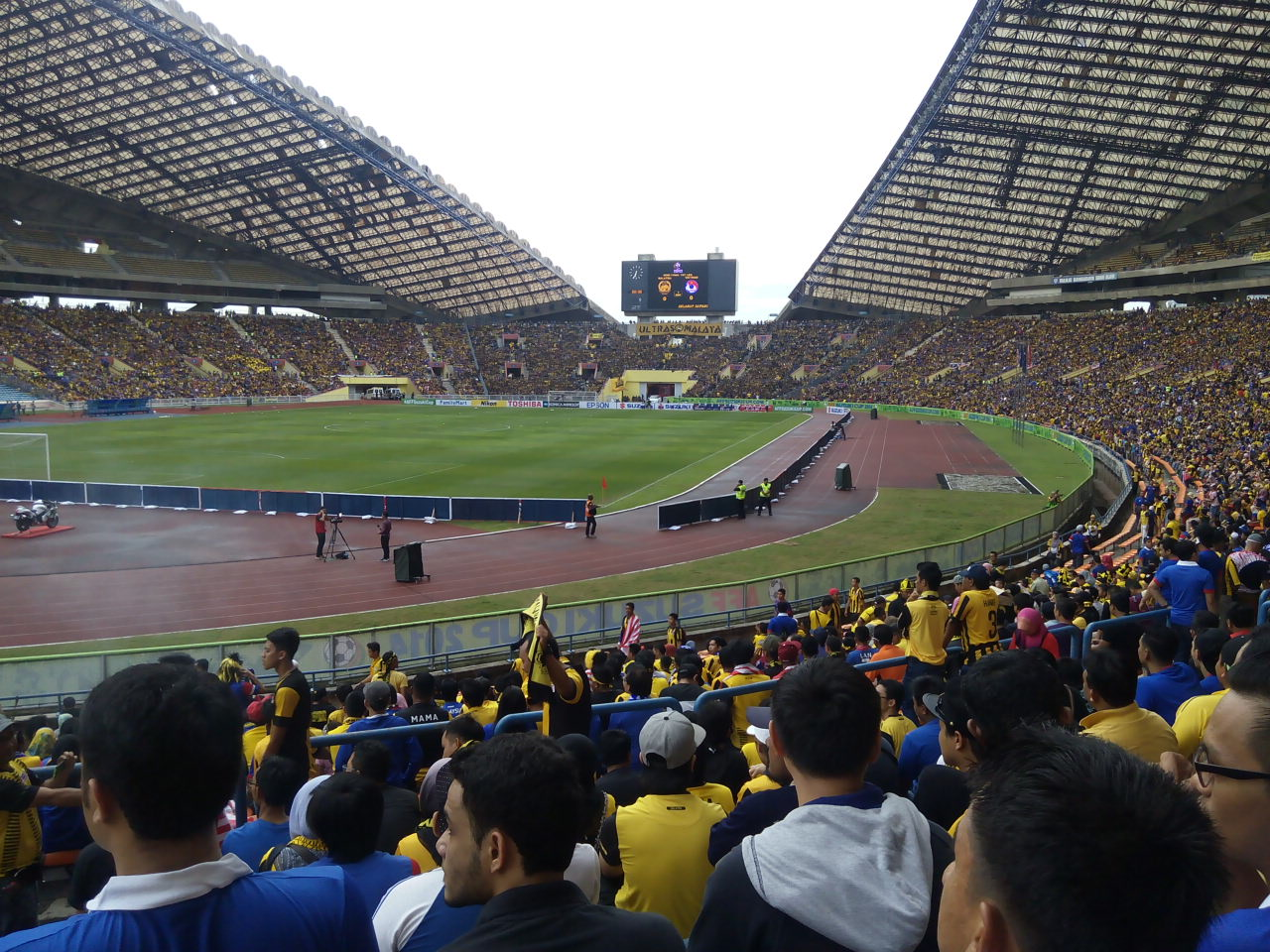
Shah Alam Stadium – the home of Selangor

Selangor used several grounds throughout their history. The club's first ground was the MAHA Stadium (collaboration with the Malayan Agri-Horticultural Association) at the intersection of Circular Road (Jalan Tun Razak) and Jalan Ampang, circa 1931 until 1940. Following the aftermath of the Japanese occupation from 1941 to 1945, the MAHA Stadium was damaged, which made it unusable and subsequently destroyed. At the same time, Selangor played at Selangor Club Field (Dataran Merdeka) from their founding until the independence of Malaya in 1957.

In September 1956, the club president Tunku Abdul Rahman ordered the construction of the Merdeka Stadium as the new home stadium for the Red Giants and to celebrate the country's upcoming independence. The stadium was finished on 21 August 1957 and was inaugurated on 31 August, the day the Federation of Malaya declared independence from British rule. Right after the declaration of independence, the club played their home matches at Merdeka Stadium, which would become the club's home ground for the next 38 years. The first football match took place on 1 September 1957, which saw Malaya defeat Burma 5–2. In this stadium which hosted 20,000 spectators, Selangor celebrated its first Malaysian league title in 1984.

After some successes, the management decided that the Merdeka Stadium was not big enough for the ambitions of the club, and a new stadium was inaugurated on 16 July 1994. This was the Shah Alam Stadium which could host an astounding number of up to 80,372 supporters, and became the club's home stadium for the next 22 years. The first match at the stadium was played between Selangor and Scottish club Dundee United in an invitational tournament, which resulted in a 1–1 draw, with the first goal being scored by Billy McKinlay. Other teams in the tournament were Bayern Munich, Leeds United, the Australian Olympic team "Olyroos" and Flamengo, who won the tournament.

Petaling Jaya Stadium – Selangor current temporary stadium

In 2017, an internal crisis occurred within the club management, which resulted in the resignation of the club's president Mohamed Azmin Ali. The crisis began when executive members of the club reportedly rejected the notion of privatization which was suggested by the club's president. The crisis forced the club to move to a temporary home ground at the Selayang Stadium, after the Selangor state government denied to use the Shah Alam Stadium.

The following year, the club management decided to switch the club's home ground to the Kuala Lumpur Stadium for the 2018 season. The club's president Subahan Kamal stated that the Kuala Lumpur Stadium could generate a higher income and that the Selayang Stadium did not meet the criteria required by the FMLLP. Selangor originally proposed to use the Shah Alam Stadium and the Bukit Jalil National Stadium, however both applications were rejected by the reason that certain matches could collide with the Malaysia national team's calendar.

The club moved back to the Shah Alam Stadium in the middle of the 2018 season after the new president Tengku Amir Shah was appointed. In early 2020, the Shah Alam Stadium was closed due to major renovation. In the middle of the 2020 season, Selangor played at the UiTM Stadium as an interim home ground following Shah Alam Stadium's temporary closure. For the 2021 season until present, the club's interim home ground venue is at the Petaling Jaya Stadium. On 15 July 2022, Amirudin Shari stated that the Selangor government appointed the Malaysian Resources Corporation Berhad (MRCB) to refurbish the stadium and its surrounding facilities with a cost of up to RM 787 million.

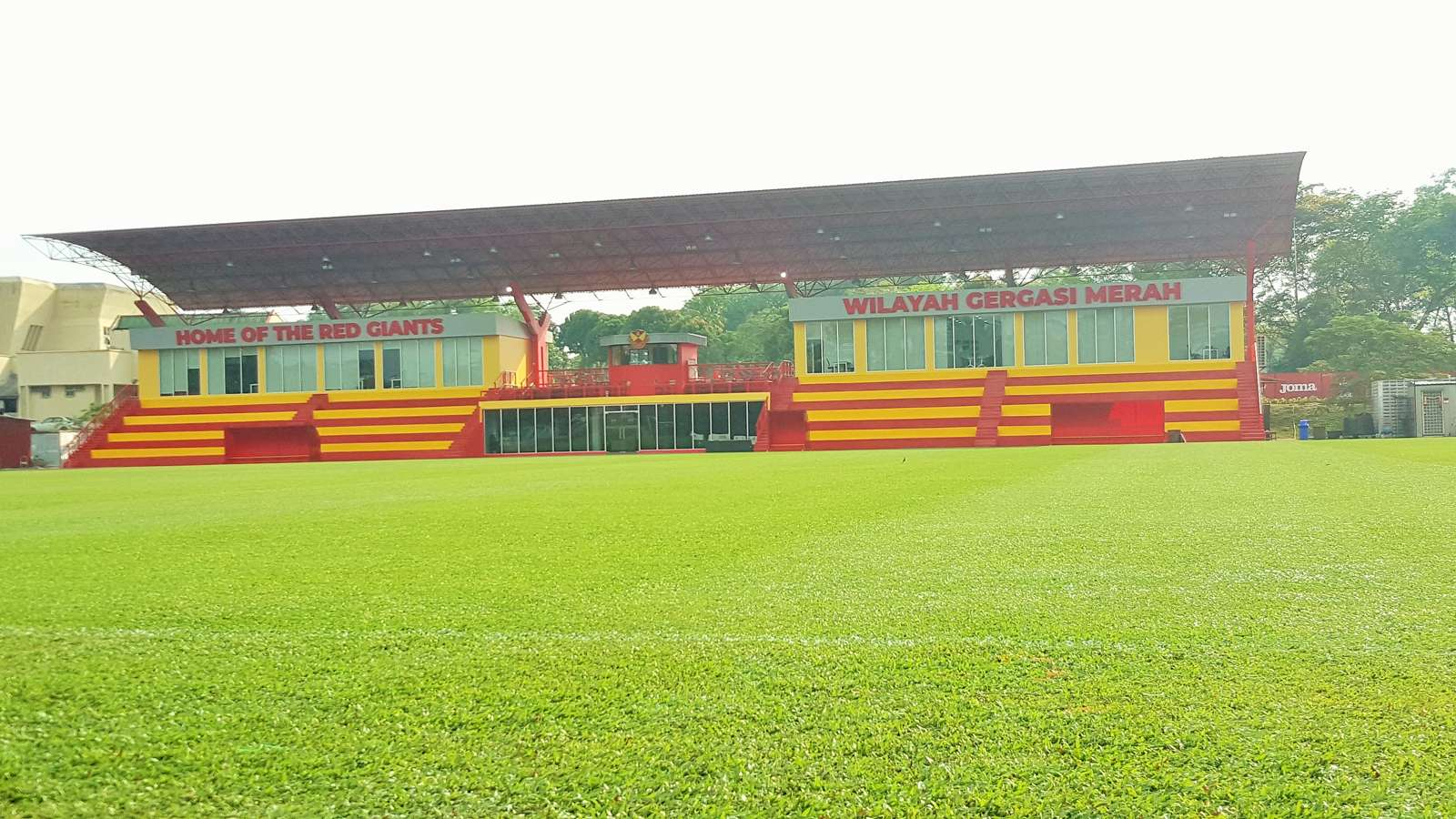
Selangor Training Centre

Stadium	Period
Selangor Club Field (Dataran Merdeka)	1921–1930
MAHA Stadium	1931–1940
TPCA Stadium (Jalan Raja Muda Abdul Aziz Stadium)	1936–1956
Stadium Merdeka	1957–1994
Shah Alam Stadium	1994–2016
Selayang Stadium (interim)	2017
Kuala Lumpur Stadium (interim)	2018
UiTM Stadium (interim)	2020
Petaling Jaya Stadium (interim)	2021–present

== Kit suppliers and shirt sponsors ==
From the 1970s onwards, the Selangor team kit was manufactured by various companies including Admiral, Puma, Adidas, Lotto, Kappa and Joma. Since 2014, the Selangor kit has been sponsored by the government of Selangor under the names of six state government corporations.

Period	Kit manufacturer	Shirt sponsor (chest)
1975–1979	(England) Admiral	No sponsors
1980	(Italy) Diadora	No sponsors
1981–1984	(Germany) Puma	No sponsors
1985–1987	(Germany) Puma	Dunhill
1988–1990	(Germany) Adidas	Dunhill
1991	(Japan) Mizuno	Dunhill
1992	(Germany) Puma	Dunhill
1993–1997	(Italy) Lotto	Dunhill, EON
1998	(Italy) Lotto	Dunhill, Courts
1999–2001	(Italy) Lotto	Dunhill
2002	(Germany) Adidas	Dunhill
2003–2004	(Italy) Kronos	Dunhill, Talam
2005–2006	(Germany) Adidas	TM, Celcom
2006–2008	(Germany) Adidas	TM, SYABAS
2009–2010	(Germany) Adidas	TM, KDEB
2011–2012	(Italy) Kappa	MBI
2013	(Italy) Kappa	MBI
2014–2015	(Italy) Kappa	Selangor State Government
2016–2017	(Italy) Lotto	Selangor State Government
2018	(Italy) Lotto	redONE
2019	(Spain) Joma	Selangor State Government
2020–2026	(Spain) Joma	PKNS & Vizione TDC HOLDINGS
2026–present	(Germany) Adidas	PKNS & Vizione TDC HOLDINGS

== Players ==
=== First-team squad ===
As of 19 September 2026

Note: Flags indicate national team as defined under FIFA eligibility rules; some limited exceptions apply. Players may hold more than one non-FIFA nationality.

No.	Pos.	Nation	Player
2	DF	MAS	Quentin Cheng
4	DF	GHA	Richmond Ankrah
5	DF	KOS	Arbenit Xhemajli
6	MF	MAS	Nooa Laine (vice-captain)
7	FW	MAS	Faisal Halim (captain)
8	MF	AUS	Peter Makrillos
9	MF	FRA	Hugo Boumous
10	MF	VEN	Eduardo Sosa
11	FW	NED	Kay Tejan
14	DF	MAS	Zikri Khalili
16	DF	MAS	A. Selvan
19	MF	MAS	Azam Azih
20	GK	MAS	Azim Al-Amin
21	DF	SGP	Safuwan Baharudin

No.	Pos.	Nation	Player
24	MF	GHA	Alex Agyarkwa
28	MF	MAS	Muhammad Khalil
29	MF	MAS	Mukhairi Ajmal
31	GK	MAS	Sikh Izhan Nazrel
33	GK	MAS	Kalamullah Al-Hafiz
40	DF	PHI	Jefferson Tabinas
43	MF	MAS	Syahir Bashah
44	DF	MAS	Sharul Nazeem
46	DF	MAS	Adib Ra'op
55	DF	MAS	Harith Haiqal
76	MF	MAS	Aliff Izwan
91	FW	BRA	Chrigor
98	FW	BRA	Vitor Pernambuco

==== Out on loan ====
Note: Flags indicate national team as defined under FIFA eligibility rules; some limited exceptions apply. Players may hold more than one non-FIFA nationality.

No.	Pos.	Nation	Player
77	MF	MAS	Aliff Haiqal (at Penang until 30 June 2027)

=== Development Squad and Academy ===
As of 1 October 2026

List of Development Squad and Academy players with first team appearances. Note: Flags indicate national team as defined under FIFA eligibility rules; some limited exceptions apply. Players may hold more than one non-FIFA nationality.

No.	Pos.	Nation	Player
34	FW	MAS	Haykal Danish
36	DF	KOR	Kwak Sung-hoon
37	FW	BRA	Pedro Ataíde
—	DF	MAS	Aiman Hakimi

No.	Pos.	Nation	Player
—	DF	MAS	Moses Raj
—	DF	MAS	Aiman Yusuf
—	MF	MAS	Danish Iskandar

== Management and staff ==
As of 9 January 2023

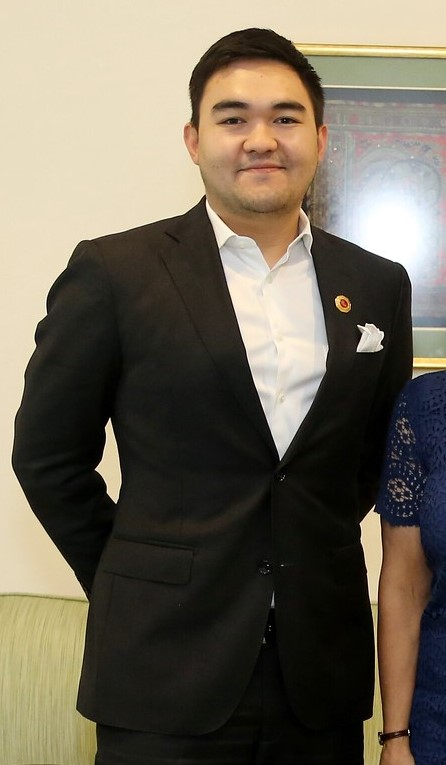
Crown Prince of Selangor, Tengku Amir Shah is the current chairman of the club

Position	Name
Chairman	(Malaysia) Tengku Amir Shah
Board of directors	(Malaysia) Shahril Mokhtar (Malaysia) Siti Zubaidah Abdul Jabar (Malaysia) Norita Mohd Sidek
Chief executive officer	(Malaysia) Johan Kamal Hamidon
Chief operation officer	(Malaysia) Aladdin Mostafa

=== Current technical staff ===
As of 1 August 2026

Position	Name
Technical Director	(France) Christophe Gamel
Team manager	(Malaysia) Mahfizul Rusydin
Assistant team manager	(Malaysia) R. Sekar Chandran
Head coach	(South Korea) Kim Pan-gon
Assistant coach	(Japan) Yuki Fujimoto
Assistant coach	(South Korea) Lee Soon-seok
Assistant coach	(Malaysia) Firdaus Aziz
Assistant coach	(Malaysia) Shahrom Kalam
Goalkeeper coach	(South Korea) Cho Jun-ho
Fitness coach	(Spain) Joel Donés
Assistant fitness coach	(Malaysia) Amirol Azmi
Team doctor	(Malaysia) Amir Azwan
Physiotherapists	(Malaysia) Jahangir Khan
Nutritionist	(Malaysia) Puteri Nurshuhada
Masseurs	(Malaysia) Halimee Yusuf
Masseurs	(Malaysia) Fadhli Zahari
Masseurs	(Malaysia) Saiful Nizam
Team analyst	(Malaysia) Arman Manar
Kitman	(Malaysia) Azman Ahmad
Kitman	(Malaysia) Faiz Khalid

== Honours ==
Selangor honours
Type	Competition	Titles	Seasons
Domestic	Liga Perdana 1/Malaysia Super League (First division)	3	2000, 2009, 2010
Domestic	Semi-Pro League Division 2/Liga Perdana 2/ Malaysia Premier League (Second division)	2	1993, 2005
Domestic	Malaysia Amateur League/Liga Semi-Pro/ Liga Perdana (Amateur division)	3	1984, 1989, 1990,
Domestic	Malaysia Cup	33	1922, 1927, 1928*, 1929*, 1935, 1936, 1938, 1949, 1956, 1959, 1961, 1962, 1963, 1966, 1968, 1969, 1971, 1972, 1973, 1975, 1976, 1978, 1979, 1981, 1982, 1984, 1986, 1995, 1996, 1997, 2002, 2005, 2015 (*shared)
Domestic	Malaysia FA Cup	5^{s}	1991, 1997, 2001, 2005, 2009
Domestic	MFL Challenge Cup	1^{s}	2024–25
Domestic	Malaysia FAM Cup (Note: It was a secondary knockout competition from 1951–1989)	7	1953*, 1960, 1961, 1962, 1966, 1968, 1972 (*shared)
Domestic	Malaysia Charity Cup	8	1985, 1987, 1990, 1996, 1997, 2002, 2009, 2010
Continental	Asian Champion Club Tournament	0	1967**
Continental	ASEAN Club Championship	0	2025–26**

Bold is for those competition that are currently active.

- record
- ^{s} shared record
- (** runner-up)

=== Doubles and trebles ===
- Doubles
  - Malaysia Amateur League and Malaysia Cup (1): 1984
  - FA Cup and Malaysia Cup (1): 1997
  - League and FA Cup (1): 2009
- Trebles
  - Premier League 2, FA Cup and Malaysia Cup (1): 2005

== Award winners ==
=== Domestic ===
- Most Valuable Player
  - (Malaysia) Shukor Adan (2006–07)
  - (Malaysia) Hazwan Bakri (2016)
- League Golden Boot
  - (Brazil) Paulo Rangel (2014)
  - (Spain) Rufino Segovia (2018)
  - (Nigeria) Ifedayo Olusegun (2020, 2021)
  - (Colombia) Ayron del Velle (2023)
- Coach of the Season
  - (Malaysia) K. Devan (2009)
  - (Malaysia) Tan Cheng Hoe (2023)
- Best Defender of the Season
  - (Malaysia) Quentin Cheng (2025–26)
- Best Midfielder of the Season
  - (Malaysia) Amri Yahyah (2009)
  - (Malaysia) Safiq Rahim (2011, 2012)
- Best Striker of the Season
  - (Malaysia) Hazwan Bakri (2016)
  - (Malaysia) Faisal Halim (2025–26)
- Best Young Player of the Season
  - (Malaysia) Adam Nor Azlin (2017)
- Best Foreign Player
  - (Spain) Rufino Segovia (2018)
- Team of the Season
  - (Malaysia) Brendan Gan (2019)
  - (Colombia) Ayron del Velle (2023)

=== Continental ===
==== ASEAN Club Championship ====
- Team of the Tournament
  - (Malaysia) Quentin Cheng (2025–26)
  - (Malaysia) Faisal Halim (2025–26)
  - (Jordan) Noor Al-Rawabdeh (2025–26)
  - (Brazil) Chrigor (2025–26)
- Best Goalkeeper of the Tournament
  - (Malaysia) Kalamullah Al-Hafiz (2025–26)

=== Others ===
- Best Football Club
  - 2005–06
- Best Supporter Clubs
  - UltraSel Curva (2011)

== Records and statistics ==
As of 20 September 2026

Top 10 all-time appearances
Rank	Player	Years	Club appearances
1	(Malaysia) R. Arumugam	1971–1988	394
2	(Malaysia) Mokhtar Dahari	1972–1987	375
3	(Malaysia) Amri Yahyah	2001–2013, 2017–2019	374
4	(Malaysia) Soh Chin Aun	1971–1978	345
5	(Malaysia) Razman Roslan	2004–2012, 2016–2018	296
6	(Malaysia) Azman Adnan	1993–1998, 2002, 2004	279
7	(Malaysia) Zainal Abidin Hassan	1980–1982, 1985–1990, 1997–1999	215
8	(Malaysia) Gunalan Padathan	2001–2012	212
9	(Malaysia) Safiq Rahim	2006–2008, 2010–2012	182
10	(Malaysia) Bunyamin Umar	2009–2017	161

Players currently playing for the club are highlighted in bold.

Top 10 all-time goalscorers
Rank	Player	Club appearances	Total goals
1	(Malaysia) Mokhtar Dahari	375	177
2	(Malaysia) Azman Adnan	279	147
3	(Malaysia) Amri Yahyah	374	138
4	(Malaysia) Zainal Abidin Hassan	215	125
5	(Malaysia) Abdul Ghani Minhat	97	106
6	(Nigeria) Ifedayo Olusegun	43	56
7	**(Brazil) Chrigor**	55	54
8	(Argentina) Brian Diego Fuentes	66	48
9	**(Indonesia)** Bambang Pamungkas	64	42
10	(Malaysia) **Faisal Halim**	107	40

- Biggest wins: 11–2 vs Kelantan (25 August 2023)
- Heaviest defeats: 0–6 vs **(South Korea)** Pohang Steelers (4 November 1998)
- Youngest ever debutant: Rahman Daud ~ **17 years and 3 months old** (On 4 March 2022 vs Kuala Lumpur City)
- Oldest ever player: Amri Yahyah ~ **38 years 5 months 22 days old** (On 13 March 2019 vs Petaling Jaya City)
- **Youngest** goal scorers: Syahmi Safari ~ **18 years 11 months 30 days** **old** (On 4 February 2017 vs PKNS)
- **Oldest** goal scorers: Amri Yahyah ~ **38 years 2 months 16 days old** (On 6 April 2019 vs Melaka United)

== Notable players ==
As of 2026–27 season.

=== International capped players ===
AFC/OFC.: (Afghanistan) Omid Musawi; (Australia) Alistair Edwards; (Australia) Dave Mitchell; (Australia) Mehmet Duraković; (Australia) Peter Makrillos; (Australia) Ross Aloisi; (Australia) Robert Cornthwaite; (Australia) Steve Pantelidis; (Australia) Taylor Regan; (Indonesia) Andik Vermansah; (Indonesia) Bambang Pamungkas; (Indonesia) Elie Aiboy; (Indonesia) Evan Dimas; (Indonesia) Ilham Armaiyn; (Jordan) Ali Olwan; (Jordan) Baha' Abdel-Rahman; (Jordan) Mo Abualnadi; (Jordan) Noor Al-Rawabdeh; (Jordan) Reziq Bani Hani; (Jordan) Yazan Al-Arab; (Lebanon) Ramez Dayoub; (Myanmar) Hein Htet Aung; (Philippines) Jefferson Tabinas; (Singapore) Safuwan Baharudin; (South Korea) Jeon Seung-min; (Timor-Leste) Juninho; (Uzbekistan) Umar Eshmurodov; (Vietnam) Michal Nguyễn	CAF.: (Cape Verde) Alvin Fortes; (Democratic Republic of the Congo) Lelo Mbele; (Liberia) Francis Doe; (Liberia) Frank Seator; (Liberia) Mass Sarr Jr.; (Liberia) Patrick Wleh; (Nigeria) Ugo Ukah; (Senegal) Mamadou Diarra; (South Africa) Mandla Zwane	UEFA.: (Croatia) Boško Balaban; (Czech Republic) Karel Stromšík; (Germany) Manuel Konrad; (Hungary) Péter Disztl; (Kosovo) Arbenit Xhemajli; (Switzerland) Oliver Buff; (Federal Republic of Yugoslavia) Perica Ognjenović	CONMEBOL/ CONCACAF.: (Brazil) Juliano Mineiro; (Chile) Ronnie Fernández; (Grenada) Antonio German; (Venezuela) Yohandry Orozco

== Managerial history ==
Name	Period	Achievements
(Malaysia) Abdul Ghani Minhat	1970–1973	1 – Malaysia League (1984); 4 – Malaysia Cup (1971, 1972, 1973, 1984); 1 – Charity Shield (1985); 1 – FAM Cup (1972)
(Malaysia) M. Chandran	1975–1978	4 – Malaysia Cup (1975, 1976, 1978, 1986); 1 – Charity Shield (1987)
(Malaysia) Chow Kwai Lam	1979–1983	1 – Malaysia League (1980); 3 – Malaysia Cup (1979, 1981, 1982)
(Malaysia) Abdul Ghani Minhat (2)	1983–1985	
(Malaysia) M. Chandran	1986–1988	
(Czech Republic) Steven Bena	1989	
(Malaysia) Khaidir Buyong	1989–1990	2 – Semi–Pro Division 1 League (1989, 1990); 1 – Charity Shield (1990)
(Australia) Ken Worden	1991	1 – FA Cup (1991); 3 – Malaysia Cup (1995, 1996, 2002); 2 – Charity Shield (1996, 2002)
(Malaysia) M. Chandran	1992	
(Germany) Bernhard Schumm	1993	1 – Semi–Pro Division 2 League (1993)
(Australia) Ken Worden	1994–1996	
(England) Steve Wicks	1997–1998	1 – FA Cup (1997); 1 – Malaysia Cup (1997); 1 – Charity Shield (1997)
(Malaysia) Ismail Zakaria	1998	
(England) Mike Pejic	1999	
(Malaysia) K. Rajagopal	1999–2000	1 – Premier 1 League (2000)
(Malaysia) Abdul Rahman Ibrahim	2001–2002	1 – FA Cup (2001)
(Australia) Ken Worden	2002–2003	
(Argentina) Omar Rubén Larrosa	2004	
(Malaysia) Ismail Ibrahim	2004	
(Australia) Ken Worden	2004	
(Malaysia) Dollah Salleh	2005–2008	1 – Premier League (2005); 1 – FA Cup (2005); 1 – Malaysia Cup (2005)
(Malaysia) K. Devan	2009–2011	2 – Super League (2009, 2010); 1 – FA Cup (2009); 2 – Charity Shield (2009, 2010)
(Malaysia) P. Maniam (caretaker)	2011	
(Malaysia) Irfan Bakti Abu Salim	2011–2013	
(Malaysia) P. Maniam (caretaker) (2)	2013	
(Australia) Mehmet Duraković	2013–2015	1 – 2015 Malaysia Cup
(Malaysia) Zainal Abidin Hassan	2015 – 2016	
(Malaysia) K. Gunalan (caretaker)	2016	
(Malaysia) P. Maniam (3)	2016 – 2018	
(Malaysia) Nazliazmi Mohd Nasir (caretaker)	2018	
(Malaysia) B. Sathianathan	2018–2020	
(Germany) Michael Feichtenbeiner (caretaker)	2020	
(Germany) Karsten Neitzel	2020–2021	
(Germany) Michael Feichtenbeiner (2)	2021–2022	
(Malaysia) Nidzam Jamil (caretaker)	2022	
(Malaysia) Tan Cheng Hoe	2022–2024	
(Malaysia) Nidzam Jamil (2)	2024	
(Netherlands) Abdifitaah Hassan (caretaker)	2024	
(Japan) Katsuhito Kinoshi	2024–2025	1 – 2024–25 MFL Challenge Cup
(France) Christophe Gamel (interim)	2025–2026	
(South Korea) Kim Pan-gon	2026–present	

== Season by season record ==
=== List of seasons ===
This is a partial list of the last seven seasons completed by the Red Giants. For the full season-by-season history, see List of Selangor F.C. seasons.

Season	League											Cup				Top goalscorer	
Season	Tier	League	Pld	W	D	L	GF	GA	GD	Pts	Pos	PS	FA	MC	CC	Player(s)	Goals
2018	1	Super League	22	7	6	9	35	39	–4	27	8th	—	RU	GS	—	(Spain) Rufino Segovia	31
2019	1	Super League	22	10	7	5	41	35	+6	37	3rd	—	3R	SF	—	(Nigeria) Ifedayo Olusegun	16
2020	1	Super League	11	4	5	2	26	19	+7	17	5th	—	CXL	CXL	—	(Nigeria) Ifedayo Olusegun	13
2021	1	Super League	22	10	6	6	45	30	+15	36	5th	—	CXL	QF	—	(Nigeria) Ifedayo Olusegun	27
2022	1	Super League	22	8	6	8	39	33	+6	30	5th	—	SF	RU	—	(Brazil) Caion	24
2023	1	Super League	26	20	1	5	72	22	+50	61	2nd	—	SF	QF	—	(Colombia) Ayron del Valle	25
2024–25	1	Super League	24	16	4	4	44	16	+28	52	2nd	RU	RU	R16	W	(Cape Verde) Alvin Fortes	20
2025–26	1	Super League	24	16	4	4	59	20	+39	52	3rd	RU	SF	SF	—	(Brazil) Chrigor	42

== Continental record ==
Season	Competition	Round	Club	Home	Away	Aggregate
1967	Asian Champion Club Tournament	First round	(South Vietnam) Vietnam Customs	0–0	2–1	2–1
1967	Asian Champion Club Tournament	Second round	(Thailand) Bangkok Bank	1–0	0–0	1–0
1967	Asian Champion Club Tournament	Semi-final	(South Korea) Korea Tungsten Company	1–0	0–0	1–0
1967	Asian Champion Club Tournament	Final	(Israel) Hapoel Tel Aviv	1–2		Runners-up
1970	Asian Champion Club Tournament	Group A (Note: All matches were played in Tehran, Iran.)	(Lebanon) Homenetmen	2–4		3rd out of 3
1970	Asian Champion Club Tournament	Group A	(Iran) Taj	0–3		3rd out of 3
1986	Asian Club Championship	Qualifying stage	Port Authority of Thailand	1–0	1–0	2–0 (Note: Both matches were played in Kuala Lumpur, Malaysia.)
1986	Asian Club Championship	Group D (Note: All matches were played in Kuala Lumpur, Malaysia.)	(Japan) Furukawa Electric	1–2		2nd out of 3
1986	Asian Club Championship	Group D	(Macau) Hap Kuan	5–0		2nd out of 3
1997–98	Asian Club Championship	First round	(Hong Kong) South China	0–0	0–2	0–2
1998–99 (Note: Selangor entered after Penang withdrew.)	Asian Club Championship	First round	Singapore Armed Forces	4–1	0–1	4–2
1998–99	Asian Club Championship	Round of 16	(South Korea) Pohang Steelers	1–4	0–6	1–10
2001–02 (Note: Selangor entered after Penang withdrew.)	Asian Club Championship	First round	(China) Dalian Shide	0–2	0–5	0–7
2006	AFC Cup	Group F	(Singapore) Tampines Rovers	1–0	2–3	2nd out of 4
2006	AFC Cup	Group F	(Maldives) Hurriyya	1–0	3–1	2nd out of 4
2006	AFC Cup	Group F	(Hong Kong) Happy Valley	4–3	3–2	2nd out of 4
2006	AFC Cup	Quarter-final	(Lebanon) Al-Nejmeh	0–1	0–0	0–1
2010	AFC Cup	Group F	(Vietnam) Bình Dương	0–0	0–4	3rd out of 4
2010	AFC Cup	Group F	(Indonesia) Sriwijaya	0–4	1–6	3rd out of 4
2010	AFC Cup	Group F	(Maldives) Victory	5–0	1–2	3rd out of 4
2013 (Note: Selangor finished third in the 2012 Malaysia Super League, they were awarded the second AFC Cup spot by virtue of the league runners-up being LionsXII, a side ineligible to represent Malaysia in continental competition.)	AFC Cup	Group H	(India) East Bengal	2–2	0–1	2nd out of 4
2013	AFC Cup	Group H	(Singapore) Tampines Rovers	3–3	3–2	2nd out of 4
2013	AFC Cup	Group H	(Vietnam) Xuân Thành Sài Gòn	3–1	1–2	2nd out of 4
2013	AFC Cup	Round of 16	(Maldives) New Radiant	0–2 (a.e.t.)		
2014 (Note: Since LionsXII won the 2013 Malaysia Super League, the league runners-up were chosen to represent Malaysia.)	AFC Cup	Group F	(Indonesia) Arema	1–1	0–1	3rd out of 4
2014	AFC Cup	Group F	(Maldives) Maziya	4–1	1–1	3rd out of 4
2014	AFC Cup	Group F	(Vietnam) Hà Nội T&T	3–1	0–1	3rd out of 4
2016 (Note: Since LionsXII won the 2015 Malaysia FA Cup, their place was taken by the 2015 Malaysia Super League runners-up.)	AFC Cup	Group E	(Philippines) Ceres	0–0	2–2	3rd out of 4
2016	AFC Cup	Group E	(Singapore) Tampines Rovers	0–1	0–1	3rd out of 4
2016	AFC Cup	Group E	(Bangladesh) Sheikh Jamal Dhanmondi	2–1	4–3	3rd out of 4
2024–25 (Note: Johor Darul Ta'zim, the 2023 Malaysia FA Cup winners, also won the league title. As a result, the 2023 Malaysia Super League runners-up Selangor qualified for the Champions League Two.)	AFC Champions League Two	Group H	(Thailand) Muangthong United	1–2	1–1	3rd out of 4
2024–25	AFC Champions League Two	Group H	(Philippines) DH Cebu	1–0	4–0	3rd out of 4
2024–25	AFC Champions League Two	Group H	(South Korea) Jeonbuk Hyundai Motors	2–1	0–1	3rd out of 4
2025–26	AFC Champions League Two	Group G	(Thailand) Bangkok United	2–4	1-1	4th out of 4
2025–26	AFC Champions League Two	Group G	(Singapore) Lion City Sailors	0-1	2-4	4th out of 4
2025–26	AFC Champions League Two	Group G	(Indonesia) Persib Bandung	0-2	2-3	4th out of 4

== See also ==
- Selangor Women
- Selangor Futsal
- Selangor U23
