= 1993 Liga Semi-Pro Divisyen 1 =

- Season: 1993
- Champions: (Kedah) Kedah; 1st title
- Matches: 162

The 1993 Liga Semi-Pro Divisyen 1 was the fifth season of the Liga Semi-Pro Divisyen 1. A total of 10 teams participated in the season.

Kedah, Pulau Pinang and Kelantan were promoted from 1992 Liga Semi-Pro Divisyen 2.

Under the new format, only the top six teams in Divisyen 1 and the Divisyen 2 champions and runners-up will be involved in the Malaysia Cup. Malaysia Cup was played from the quarter-final stage, scheduled for November after the league was finished. The Malaysia Cup quarter-final and semi-final matches will be played on a home and away basis.

After the end of the season, both division of Malaysian Semi-Pro Football League were merged to create the Malaysian first professional football league, the Malaysia Premier League starting from 1994 season. Kedah ended up as the league winner for this season.

== Teams ==
10 teams competing in the last season of Liga Semi-Pro Divisyen 1.

- Kedah (1993 Liga Semi-Pro Divisyen 1 champions)
- Sarawak
- Perak
- Pahang
- Johor
- Kelantan
- (Penang) Pulau Pinang
- Terengganu
- Kuala Lumpur
- Negeri Sembilan

=== Divisyen 1 ===
Pos	Team	Pld	W	D	L	GF	GA	GD	Pts
1	Kedah (C)	18	13	4	1	38	13	+25	43
2	Sarawak	18	9	7	2	31	13	+18	34
3	Perak	18	9	7	2	3	13	−10	34
4	Pahang	18	8	6	4	33	26	+7	30
5	Johor	18	7	6	5	29	22	+7	27
6	Kelantan	18	5	4	9	31	34	−3	19
7	(Penang) Pulau Pinang	18	5	4	9	15	29	−14	19
8	Terengganu	18	3	5	10	19	36	−17	14
9	Kuala Lumpur	18	2	7	9	18	29	−11	13
10	Negeri Sembilan	18	3	2	13	24	46	−22	11

(C) Champions

== Champions ==
1993 Semi-Pro Divisyen 1 champions

Kedah
1st title
