= Zoran Nikolić (footballer) =

Serbian footballer and manager

Zoran Nikolić (Serbian Cyrillic: Зоран Николић; born 28 November 1960) is a Serbian football manager and former player.

== Club career ==
He played for Red Star Belgrade, OFK Kikinda (from 1984–1987), HNK Šibenik, Selangor FA (1989–1991) and Kuala Lumpur FA (from 1991–1995).

Regarded as a playmaker during his stint at Kuala Lumpur, Nikolić specialised in long-range attacks, freekicks, and passing, helping Azman Adnan scoring a record 22 goals in a single season for the club.
