= Malaysian League =

Malaysian League (Liga Malaysia)
- Founded: 1979 (Amateur league); 1982 (League trophy introduced); 1989 (Semi-professional league); 1994 (Professional league); 2004 (Semi-privatisation era); 2016 (Privatisation era)
- Country: Malaysia
- Confederation: AFC

The Malaysian League, also known as the M-League (Malay: Liga Malaysia or Liga-M), is a terminology used to describe the professional football league in Malaysia. The terminology was mainly used to describe the league and its divisions associated within the Malaysian football league system.

== History ==
=== Origin ===
In 1967, the Malaya Cup (Malay: Piala Malaya) was renamed as the Malaysia Cup (Malay: Piala Malaysia), but the amateur ethos continued until the foundation of a nationwide league introduced by the Football Association of Malaysia (FAM) in 1979 (through a revamp of the format for the Malaysia Cup).

=== Era of Liga Malaysia (1979–1989) ===
A Malaysian football league competition involving the representative sides of the state football associations was first held in Malaysia in 1979. When it began, it was intended primarily as a qualifying tournament for the knockout stages of the Malaysia Cup where teams competed in a one-round league before advancing to the knockout stages. The top four teams at the end of the league will face off in two semi-finals before the winners advance to the finals. In 1981, the quarter-finals stage were introduced where eight teams qualified from the preliminary stage.

However, it was not until 1982 that a league trophy was introduced for Liga Malaysia to recognise the winners of the preliminary stage as the league champions which then officially started the era of a nationwide football league in Malaysia at an amateur level. Since then, the Malaysia Cup has been held after the conclusion of the league each year, with only the best-performing teams in the league qualifying for the tournament. Over the years, the league competition gained important stature in its own right.

=== Era of Liga Semi-Pro (1989–1993) ===
In the early days, the Malaysian football league system consisted of a single division amateur league before changes were made in 1989 when it was fully known as Liga Semi-Pro from 1989 to 1993. The league was divided into two divisions, Liga Semi-Pro Divisyen 1 and Liga Semi-Pro Divisyen 2.

The inaugural season of the Liga Semi-Pro consisted of nine teams in Divisyen 1 and eight teams in Divisyen 2. The Royal Malaysian Police joined Divisyen 2 in 1990. Games were played on a home and away basis for about four months roughly between the end of April or early May and the end of August or early September.

=== Early era of Liga Perdana (1994–1997) ===
Liga Perdana was formed and established in 1994 to succeed the Liga Semi-Pro and became Malaysia's first fully professional football league and was the top-tier football league in the country at that time. At this time the league was interchangeably referred as the Malaysian League or M-League.

=== Era of Liga Perdana 1 and Liga Perdana 2 (1998–2003) ===
In 1998, Liga Perdana was divided into two divisions, consisting of Liga Perdana 1 and Liga Perdana 2. During this time both divisions were just referred to as the Malaysian League as a whole.

In the 1998 season, Liga Perdana 1 consisted of 12 teams while Liga Perdana 2 had 8 teams. 10 teams that previously qualified for the Malaysia Cup that also competed in the 1997 Liga Perdana were automatically qualified to for that season's Liga Perdana 1. The other two spots were filled by a playoff round of the 5 lowest teams in the 1997 Liga Perdana and the Malaysian Olympic football team, Olympic 2000. The lowest four teams from the playoff round were then put into Liga Perdana 2 alongside the Police, the Malaysian Armed Forces, Negeri Sembilan Chempaka F.C and PKN Johor. At this time, the league still consisted of semi-professional teams where each team was allowed to register 25 players where 12 players must be a professional for Liga Perdana 1 and a minimum of six professional players in Liga Perdana 2.

Both leagues continued until 2003 when the Football Association of Malaysia (FAM) decided to privatise the league from the 2004 season onwards when the Malaysia Super League was formed. Teams in Liga Perdana 1 and Liga Perdana 2 were put through a qualification stage and playoffs to be promoted into the brand new Malaysia Super League. Teams that failed to progress in the qualifications were put into the new second-tier league, the Malaysia Premier League.

=== Era of Malaysia Super League and Malaysia Premier League (2004 onwards) ===
After 2004, the Malaysian League term is mainly used to describe the top-two divisions in the Malaysian football league system as a whole rather than just the top-tier division in the country.

== Logo history ==
There have been multiple different iterations of the Malaysian League logo. The first logo was used during the era of Dunhill sponsorship. The new logo which replaced it was when Telekom Malaysia sponsored the league in 2005. The last logo used was in 2011 when Astro Media first sponsored the Malaysian League. From 2012, no logo was created for the league as the Malaysia Super League and the Malaysia Premier League had its own logos.

The Malaysian League Logo which was used for the 2011 Malaysian League season.

== See also ==
- Malaysian Football League
- Liga Malaysia (1982–1988)
- Liga Semi-Pro
- Liga Semi-Pro Divisyen 1
- Liga Semi-Pro Divisyen 2
- Liga Perdana
- Liga Perdana 1
- Liga Perdana 2
- Malaysia Super League
- Malaysia Premier League
- Malaysia FAM League
- Malaysia Cup
- Malaysia FA Cup
