= Mate Borovac =

Croatian footballer

Personal information
- Full name: Mate Borovac
- Date of birth: 2 January 1963 (age 63)
- Position: Midfielder

Senior career*
Years	Team	Apps	(Gls)
19?–1989	Neretva		
1989–1990	Johor FA		
1990–1992	Neretva		
1992–1993	Pazinka	27	(0)
1993–1994	Varteks	1	(0)
1994–1996	Neretva	58	(2)
- * Club domestic league appearances and goals

Mate Borovac (born 2 January 1963) is a Croatian retired footballer.

== Club career ==
During his club career he played mostly for NK Neretva. In late 80s, he was one of the first Croatian (Yugoslavian at that time) players playing in Malaysia.
