= 1992 Liga Semi-Pro Divisyen 1 =

- Season: 1992
- Champions: Pahang; 1st title
- Relegated: Singapore; Selangor
- Matches played: 162

The 1992 Liga Semi-Pro Divisyen 1 was the fourth season of the Liga Semi-Pro Divisyen 1. A total of 10 teams participated in the season.

Negeri Sembilan and Sarawak were promoted from 1991 Liga Semi-Pro Divisyen 2.

Under the new format, only the top six teams in Divisyen 1 and the Divisyen 2 champions and runners-up will be involved in the Malaysia Cup. Malaysia Cup was played from the quarter-final stage, scheduled for November after the league was finished. The Malaysia Cup quarter-final and semi-final matches will be played on a home and away basis.

The season kicked off on 10 May 1992. Pahang ended up the season by winning the title.

== Teams ==
10 teams competing in the fourth season of Liga Semi-Pro Divisyen 1.

- Pahang (1992 Liga Semi-Pro Divisyen 1 champions)
- Terengganu
- Negeri Sembilan
- Sarawak
- Kuala Lumpur
- Perak
- Johor
- Sabah (1992 MSPFL relegation play-off)
- Singapore (1992 MSPFL relegation)
- Selangor (1992 MSPFL relegation)

League Table:-

1.Pahang - 27 PTS (1992 Liga Semi-Pro Divisyen 1 champions)

2.Terengganu - 21 PTS

3.Negeri Sembilan - 20 PTS

4.Sarawak - 19 PTS

5.Kuala Lumpur - 18 PTS

6.Perak - 17 PTS

7.Johor - 17 PTS

8.Sabah - 16 PTS (1992 Liga Semi-Pro relegation play-off) (Relegated to 1993 Liga Semi-Pro Divisyen 2)

9.Singapore - 13 PTS (Relegated to 1993 Liga Semi-Pro Divisyen 2)

10.Selangor - 12 PTS (Relegated to 1993 Liga Semi-Pro Divisyen 2)

== Champions ==
1992 Liga Semi-Pro Divisyen 1 champion

Pahang
1st title
