= 1991 Liga Semi-Pro Divisyen 1 =

- Season: 1991
- Champions: Johor; 1st title
- Relegated: Kedah; Kelantan
- Matches played: 162

The 1991 Liga Semi-Pro Divisyen 1 was the third season of the Liga Semi-Pro Divisyen 1. A total of 10 teams participated in the season.

Terengganu and Kelantan were promoted from 1990 Liga Semi-Pro Divisyen 2.

Under the new format, only the top six teams in Divisyen 1 and the Divisyen 2 champions and runners-up will be involved in the Malaysia Cup. Malaysia Cup was played from the quarter-final stage, scheduled for November after the league was finished. The Malaysia Cup quarter-final and semi-final matches will be played on a home and away basis.

The season kicked off on 27 April 1991. Johor ended up the season by winning the title.

== Teams ==
10 teams competing in the third season of Liga Semi-Pro Divisyen 1.

- Johor (1991 Liga Semi-Pro Divisyen 1 champions)
- Pahang
- Perak
- Kuala Lumpur
- Selangor
- Terengganu
- Sabah
- Singapore (1991 MSPFL relegation play-off)
- Kedah (Relegated to Liga Semi-Pro Divisyen 2)
- Kelantan (Relegated to Liga Semi-Pro Divisyen 2)

League Table:-

1.Johor - 22 PTS (1991 Liga Semi-Pro Divisyen 1 champions)

2.Pahang - 21 PTS

3.Perak - 20 PTS

4.Kuala Lumpur - 20 PTS

5.Selangor - 19 PTS

6.Terengganu - 18 PTS

7.Sabah - 18 PTS

8.Singapore - 14 PTS (1991 Liga Semi-Pro relegation play-off) (Stay)

9.Kedah - 11 PTS (Relegated to 1992 Liga Semi-Pro Divisyen 2)

10.Kelantan - 11 PTS (Relegated to 1992 Liga Semi-Pro Divisyen 2)

== Champions ==
1991 Liga Semi-Pro Divisyen 1 champion

Johor
1st title
