= Liga Malaysia (1982–1988) =

- Founded: 1982; 43 years ago
- Folded: 1988; 37 years ago
- Country: Malaysia
- Other club(s) from: Brunei, Singapore
- Confederation: AFC
- Number of clubs: 17 (from 1985)
- Level on pyramid: 1
- Domestic cup(s): Malaysia Cup
- Last champions: Kuala Lumpur (1988)
- Most championships: Kuala Lumpur (2 titles)
- Broadcaster(s): RTM

Liga Malaysia (English: Malaysian League) was an amateur football league in Malaysia that operated from 1982 until 1988. The league was managed by the Football Association of Malaysia. The Malaysian League was established in 1982 after the introduction of a league trophy for the winner of the league stage qualification round for the Malaysia Cup (Malay: Piala Malaysia), with the format first introduced in 1979 where the top eight teams qualified from the league to compete in the knockout stages of the Malaysia Cup.

During its inaugural season in 1982, 16 teams participated in a single-tier league. All 13 state football teams, Kuala Lumpur (known as Federal Territory FA at that time), the Armed Forces, and a representative team from Brunei competed in the league. In 1985, Singapore rejoined the Malaysian football league system and thus competed in the Malaysian League and Malaysia Cup after a temporary spell away, which brought the number of teams up to 17. The league did not operate on a system of promotion and relegation.

The league was the nation's top-tier league until it was succeeded by the formation of Liga Semi-Pro in 1989 which was also managed by the Football Association of Malaysia.

== History ==
=== Origin ===
The concept of an annual competition between the states in Malaysia goes back with the advent of the Malaya Cup in 1921. In 1967, the Malaya Cup was renamed as the Malaysia Cup, while state leagues were being run by their respective state football associations that covered wider geographical areas. In 1979, the FAM introduced a new format for the Malaysia Cup with the introduction of a league stage qualification round for the tournament. The football league competition involved the representative sides of the state football associations, the armed forces and representative sides from Brunei and Singapore.

=== League trophy introduction ===
It was not until 1982 that a league trophy was introduced to recognise the winners of the preliminary stage as the league champions. Over the years, the league competition gained an important stature in its own right. From 1982 until 1988 the league held an amateur status and continued its purpose as a qualifying round for the Malaysia Cup. It wasn't until 1989 that the league was succeeded by the formation of the Liga Semi-Pro.

== 1982 season ==
In its inaugural season, the league consisted of teams as below.

- Penang (1982 Malaysian League champions)
- Pahang
- (Kuala Lumpur) Federal Territory
- Kedah
- Kelantan
- Sarawak
- Johor
- Selangor (1982 Malaysia Cup winners)
- Malacca
- (Malaysia) Armed Forces
- Negeri Sembilan
- Perlis
- Terengganu
- Brunei
- Sabah
- Perak

== 1983 season ==
In its second season, the league consisted of teams as below.

- Malacca (1983 Malaysian League champions)
- Penang
- Kelantan
- Kedah
- Pahang (1983 Malaysia Cup winners)
- Selangor
- Brunei
- (Kuala Lumpur) Federal Territory
- Johor
- Sabah
- Perlis
- Sarawak
- Negeri Sembilan
- Terengganu
- Perak
- (Malaysia) Armed Forces

== 1984 season ==
In its third season, the league consisted of teams as below.

- Selangor (1984 Malaysian League champions and Malaysia Cup winners)
- Pahang
- Penang
- (Kuala Lumpur) Federal Territory
- Sabah
- Malacca
- Kelantan
- Johor
- Negeri Sembilan
- (Malaysia) Armed Forces
- Terengganu
- Perak
- Kedah
- Sarawak
- Brunei
- Perlis

== 1985 season ==
In its fourth season, the league consisted of teams as below with the inclusion of Singapore. Although, Malacca were suspended from the league season.

- Singapore (1985 Malaysian League champions)
- Johor (1985 Malaysia Cup winners)
- Pahang
- Terengganu
- (Kuala Lumpur) Federal Territory
- Selangor
- Perlis
- (Malaysia) Armed Forces
- Perak
- Penang
- Kedah
- Kelantan
- Sarawak
- Brunei
- Negeri Sembilan
- Sabah
- Malacca

== 1986 season ==
In its fifth season, the league consisted of teams as below.

- Kuala Lumpur (1986 Malaysian League champions)
- Singapore
- Selangor (1986 Malaysia Cup winners)
- Pahang
- Johor
- Terengganu
- Kedah
- Kelantan
- Sarawak
- (Malaysia) Armed Forces
- Penang
- Negeri Sembilan
- Perak
- Malacca
- Perlis
- Brunei
- Sabah

== 1987 season ==
In its sixth season, the league consisted of teams as below.

- Pahang (1987 Malaysian League champions)
- Kuala Lumpur (1987 Malaysia Cup winners)
- Singapore
- Johor
- Terengganu
- Perlis
- Kelantan
- Kedah
- Selangor
- Sabah
- Perak
- Brunei
- Penang
- Sarawak
- (Malaysia) Armed Forces
- Negeri Sembilan
- Malacca

== 1988 season ==
In its last season, the league consisted of teams as below.

- Kuala Lumpur (1988 Malaysian League champions and Malaysia Cup winners)
- Singapore
- Kelantan
- Kedah
- Penang
- Sarawak
- Johor
- Selangor
- Pahang
- Negeri Sembilan
- Terengganu
- Perak
- Malacca
- Perlis
- Sabah
- Brunei
- (Malaysia) Air Forces

== Champions ==
Below are the list of Malaysian League champions from 1982 to 1988.

Year	Champions (number of titles)	Runners-up	Third place
1982	Penang	Federal Territory	Selangor
1983	Malacca	Penang	Kelantan
1984	Selangor	Pahang	Penang
1985	Singapore	Johor	Pahang
1986	Kuala Lumpur	Singapore	Selangor
1987	Pahang	Kuala Lumpur	Singapore
1988	Kuala Lumpur (2)	Singapore	Kelantan

== See also ==
- Malaysian League
- Liga Semi-Pro
- Liga Perdana (1994–97)
