= 1990s Negeri Sembilan FA seasons =

Negeri Sembilan
1990–1999 season
- Stadium: Tuanku Abdul Rahman Stadium (1992–1999); Seremban Municipal Council Stadium (1990–1992)

Negeri Sembilan Football Club (Malay: Kelab Bola Sepak Negeri Sembilan), commonly referred to as Negeri Sembilan FC or simply NSFC, is a Malaysian professional football club based in Seremban, Negeri Sembilan, Malaysia.

From 1990 to 1999, Negeri Sembilan played in the Semi-Pro League 1, Semi-Pro League 2, Premier League and the Premier 1. During that period, the team has won the Liga Semi-Pro Divisyen 2 in 1991 and Kings Gold Cup in 1992.

This article displays Negeri Sembilan's squads, competitions, transfers, statistics, and achievements for the period 1990–1999.

== Events (1990–1999) ==
1991 was the year of the revival of the Negeri Sembilan team, which in previous years had been an underdog. That was also the last year the Negeri Sembilan team used the Majlis Perbandaran Seremban Stadium before the Tuanku Abdul Rahman Stadium in Paroi was used as their home ground until now. On 18 August 1991, the team met Sarawak in the final match of the Division 2 League at the Majlis Perbandaran Seremban Stadium. Negeri Sembilan, who was in first place at the time, only needed a draw while Sarawak, who was in second place, needed a win to get the top spot in the league table. The match of that day went to Negeri Sembilan with a result of 2–2, and they managed to collect one point. It was the last year that led to the success of winning the Semi-Pro League Division 2, then qualifying for Division 1 in 1992. Among the star players at that time were the import trio, the Bozik Brothers (Miroslav and Robert), and the powerful striker Marian Vazquez. Local players include Richard Scully, Mansor Sulaiman, and Nazari Hussein.

In 1992 the construction of Tuanku Abdul Rahman Stadium was completed and inaugurated to be used as a multipurpose stadium. The stadium initially held a capacity of 20,000 people, and since then, the Negeri Sembilan team has officially made the stadium their home ground for the Liga Semi-Pro Divisyen 1 tournament in that year.

On 12 April 1992 the Negeri Sembilan team won the 1992 Kings' Gold Cup after beating Terengganu FA, 2–1, at Tuanku Abdul Rahman Stadium, Paroi. The coaches and players shared a cash reward of RM20,000 from the Negeri Sembilan Malay Football Association. Negeri Sembilan's coach at that time was Haji Mohd Zaki Shaikh Ahmad. Earlier, the last time Negeri Sembilan FA participated in the final of the trophy was in 1953, when they lost 1–2 to Pulau Pinang.

In the 1996 season Negeri Sembilan became one of the contenders for the league title. Even though it was not given much attention at first, the team starring two former import players from Argentina, Pahang FA's Gus Cerro and Jose Iriarte, surprised many when they gave great competition to other selected teams such as Selangor, Sabah, Sarawak, Kedah, Pahang, and Brunei. Othman Katmon, Faizal Zainal, Khairil Zainal, Rosli Omar, B. Rajinikandh (now converted to Islam), A. Ganeson, V. Arumugham, Idris Kadir, Azmi Mohamed, and Ching Hong Aik (only a few mentions) have put up a good fight, giving great hope to their loyal supporters. However, this squad failed to maintain the momentum when it was finally overtaken by Sabah FA, who emerged as the Premier League champion, as well as Kedah FA, who became the runner-up.

== 1990 Negeri Sembilan FA season ==
=== Squad ===
Coach: (Malaysia) Ruslan Yaakob

Goalkeeper

- (Malaysia) Mohamed Najib Abdul Hamid

Defender

- (Slovakia) Miroslav Bozik
- (Malaysia) K. Sathiaselvam
- (Malaysia) Aminuddin Hussin
- (Malaysia) Taufik Ismail
- (Malaysia) Nordin Ahmad

Midfielder

- (Malaysia) Hisham Jani
- (Malaysia) Mansor Sulaiman
- (Malaysia) Yeo Swee Hock
- (Malaysia) Shaarani Mohamed Said
- (Malaysia) Nazari Hussain
- (Malaysia) L. Selvakumaran
- (Malaysia) Azwan Ibrahim
- (Malaysia) Shaimee Harun
- (Malaysia) Sebastian Liew

Attacker

- (Socialist Federal Republic of Yugoslavia) Srdjan Delibasic
- (Spain) Juan Manuel Rodrigues Olsson
- (Malaysia) M. Mahendran

=== Kits and sponsors ===
Manufacturer	Sponsor	Home	Away	Third
Mizuno	Dunhill / EON			

=== Competitions ===
==== Semi-Pro League 2 ====
League Table:-

1.Terengganu - 23 PTS (1990 Liga Semi-Pro Divisyen 2 champions and promoted to 1991 Liga Semi-Pro Divisyen 1)

2.Kelantan - 20 PTS (Promoted to 1991 Liga Semi-Pro Divisyen 1)

3.Negeri Sembilan - 18 PTS

4.Armed Forces - 15 PTS

5.Malacca - 13 PTS

6.Penang - 10 PTS

7.Brunei - 8 PTS

8.Police - 5 PTS

=== Statistic ===
Note:

- Pld = Played, W = Won, D = Drawn, L = Lost, F = Goals for, A = Goals against, Pts= Points, Pos = Position

1st or Champions 2nd or Runner-up 3rd place Promotion Relegation

Season	League									Cup				Asia		Note
Season	Division	Pld	W	D	L	F	A	Pts	Pos	Charity	Malaysia	FA	Challenge	Competition	Result	Note
1990	Liga Semi-Pro 2	14	8	2	4	20	40	18	3rd	—	—	1st round	—	—	—	

=== Achievement ===
Top scorer:

== 1991 Negeri Sembilan FA season ==
=== Squad ===
Coach: (Malaysia) Ruslan Yaakob

Goalkeeper:

- (Malaysia) Richard Scully
- (Malaysia) Yusri Abd Aziz
- (Malaysia) K. Loganathan

Defender:

- (Slovakia) Miroslav Bozik
- (Malaysia) K. Sathiaselvam
- (Malaysia) M. Magendran
- (Malaysia) Nordin Ahmad
- (Malaysia) Mohamad Shaari Said
- (Malaysia) Taufik Ismail
- (Malaysia) Aminuddin Hussin

Midfielder:

- (Malaysia) Shaarani Mohamed Said
- (Malaysia) Yeo Swee Hock
- (Malaysia) Mansor Sulaiman
- (Malaysia) Hisham Jani
- (Malaysia) Hisham Ghani
- (Malaysia) Halim Zaiton
- (Slovakia) Robert Bozik
- (Malaysia) Nazari Hussin
- (Malaysia) Sebastian Liew
- (Malaysia) George Pauls
- (Malaysia) Shaimee Harun
- (Malaysia) Abd Latif Mohd Amin

Attacker:

- (Malaysia) Sharil Salleh
- (Malaysia) M. Mahendran
- (Slovakia) Marian Valach

=== Kits and sponsors ===
Manufacturer	Sponsor	Home	Away	Third
Mizuno	Dunhill / EON			

=== Competition ===
==== Semi-Pro League 2 ====
League Table:-

1.Negeri Sembilan - 19 PTS (1991 Liga Semi-Pro Divisyen 2 champions and promoted to 1992 Liga Semi-Pro Divisyen 1)

2.Sarawak - 18 PTS (Promoted to 1992 Liga Semi-Pro Divisyen 1)

3.Penang - 18 PTS (1991 Liga Semi-Pro promotion play-off) (Stay)

4.Police - 16 PTS

5.Perlis - 15 PTS

6.Malacca - 10 PTS

7.Brunei - 10 PTS

8.Armed Forces - 6 PTS

=== Statistic ===
Note:

- Pld = Played, W = Won, D = Drawn, L = Lost, F = Goals for, A = Goals against, Pts= Points, Pos = Position

1st or Champions 2nd or Runner-up 3rd place Promotion Relegation

Season	League									Cup				Asia		Note
Season	Division	Pld	W	D	L	F	A	Pts	Pos	Charity	Malaysia	FA	Challenge	Competition	Result	Note
1991	Liga Semi-Pro 2	14	9	2	3	28	10	19	1st	—	Group stage	1st round	—	—	—	

=== Achievement ===
Semi-Pro League 2: Winner

Top Scorer:

== 1992 Negeri Sembilan FA season ==
=== Squad ===
Coach: (Slovakia) Joseph Herel

Goalkeeper:

- (Malaysia) Khairuddin Idris
- (Malaysia) Asbullah Mahamad
- (Malaysia) K. Loganathan

Defender:

- (Slovakia) Miroslav Bozik
- (Czech Republic) Milan Hanko
- (Malaysia) Serbegeth Singh
- (Malaysia) Mohamad Shaari Said
- (Malaysia) Abdul Ghani Hassan
- (Malaysia) Aminuddin Husin
- (Malaysia) Taufik Ismail
- (Malaysia) K. Sathiaselvam
- (Malaysia) Naina Mohamad
- (Malaysia) M. Magendran
- (Malaysia) Shahril Salleh

Midfielder:

- (Slovakia) Robert Bozik
- (Malaysia) Yeo Swee Hock
- (Malaysia) Lim Teong Kim
- (Malaysia) Hisham Ghani
- (Malaysia) Mansor Sulaiman
- (Malaysia) Nordin Ahmad
- (Malaysia) Hisham Jani
- (Malaysia) Norhaizan Baijuri

Attacker:

- (Malaysia) Mohamad Nor Yaacob
- (Malaysia) M. Mahendran
- (Malaysia) Isham Shahruddin
- (Malaysia) K. Vadiveloo

=== Kits and sponsors ===
Manufacturer	Sponsor	Home	Away	Third
Mizuno	Dunhill / EON			—

=== Competition ===
==== Semi-Pro League 1 ====
League Table:-

1.Pahang - 27 PTS (1992 Liga Semi-Pro Divisyen 1 champions)

2.Terengganu - 21 PTS

3.Negeri Sembilan - 20 PTS

4.Sarawak - 19 PTS

5.Kuala Lumpur - 18 PTS

6.Perak - 17 PTS

7.Johor - 17 PTS

8.Sabah - 16 PTS (1992 Liga Semi-Pro relegation play-off) (Relegated to 1993 Liga Semi-Pro Divisyen 2)

9.Singapore - 13 PTS (Relegated to 1993 Liga Semi-Pro Divisyen 2)

10.Selangor - 12 PTS (Relegated to 1993 Liga Semi-Pro Divisyen 2)

==== Malaysia Cup ====
Group B

1.Pahang 6 3 3 0 8- 4 9

2.Kedah 6 3 2 1 13- 8 8

3.Negri Sembilan 6 2 1 3 6- 8 5

4.Perak 6 0 2 4 7-14 2

Round 1 (Sep 19)

Negri Sembilan	1–0	Kedah
Hisham Ghani 70	1–0	

Round 2 (Sep 26)

Perak	0–0	Negri Sembilan

Round 3 (Sep 30)

Pahang	3–1	Negri Sembilan
Dollah Salleh 50, 56 Mubin Mokhtar 85	3–1	Isham Shahruddin 24

Round 4 (Oct 6)

Negri Sembilan	0–1	Pahang
	0–1	Zainal Abidin 44

Round 5 (Oct 10)

Negri Sembilan	4–1	Perak
M.Mahendran 8 Robert Bozik 49 (pen) Yeoh Swee Hock 55 Lim Teong Kim 89	4–1	Azizol Abu Haniffah 70

Round 6

Kedah	3–0	Negri Sembilan
Faridzuan Che Hamid 26, 75, Peter Nieketien 80	3–0	

=== Statistic ===
Note:

- Pld = Played, W = Won, D = Drawn, L = Lost, F = Goals for, A = Goals against, Pts= Points, Pos = Position

1st or Champions 2nd or Runner-up 3rd place Promotion Relegation

Season	League									Cup				Asia		Note
Season	Division	Pld	W	D	L	F	A	Pts	Pos	Charity	Malaysia	FA	Challenge	Competition	Result	Note
1992	Liga Semi-Pro 1	18	7	6	5	23	22	20	3rd	—	Group stage	1st round	—	—	—	

=== Achievement ===
Top scorer:

== 1993 Negeri Sembilan FA season ==
=== Squad ===
Coach: (Slovakia) Joseph Herel

Goalkeeper:

- (Malaysia) Khairuddin Idris
- (Malaysia) Asbullah Mahamad

Defender:

- (Slovakia) Miroslav Bozik
- (Malaysia) Ching Hong Aik
- (Malaysia) See Kim Seng
- (Malaysia) Aminuddin Hussin

Midfielder:

- (Slovakia) Robert Bozik
- (Malaysia) 17. Jelani Wilastra
- (Malaysia) Naina Mohamad
- (Malaysia) Shahril Salleh

Attacker:

- (Malaysia) Yeo Swee Hock
- (Socialist Federal Republic of Yugoslavia) 10. Esad Sejdic
- (Malaysia) 9. A. Anbalagan
- (Malaysia) Adnan Ibrahim

=== Kits and sponsors ===
Manufacturer	Sponsor	Home	Away	Third
Adidas	Dunhill / EON			—

=== Competition ===
==== Semi-Pro League 1 ====
Pos	Team	Pld	W	D	L	GF	GA	GD	Pts
1	Kedah (C)	18	13	4	1	38	13	+25	43
2	Sarawak	18	9	7	2	31	13	+18	34
3	Perak	18	9	7	2	3	13	−10	34
4	Pahang	18	8	6	4	33	26	+7	30
5	Johor	18	7	6	5	29	22	+7	27
6	Kelantan	18	5	4	9	31	34	−3	19
7	(Penang) Pulau Pinang	18	5	4	9	15	29	−14	19
8	Terengganu	18	3	5	10	19	36	−17	14
9	Kuala Lumpur	18	2	7	9	18	29	−11	13
10	Negeri Sembilan	18	3	2	13	24	46	−22	11

(C) Champions

=== Statistic ===
Note:

- Pld = Played, W = Won, D = Drawn, L = Lost, F = Goals for, A = Goals against, Pts= Points, Pos = Position

1st or Champions 2nd or Runner-up 3rd place Promotion Relegation

Season	League									Cup				Asia		Note
Season	Division	Pld	W	D	L	F	A	Pts	Pos	Charity	Malaysia	FA	Challenge	Competition	Result	Note
1993	Liga Semi-Pro 1	18	3	2	13	24	46	11	10th	—	—	Semi-finals	—	—	—	

=== Achievement ===
Top scorer:

== 1994 Negeri Sembilan FA season ==
=== Squad ===
Coach: M. Karathu

Goalkeeper:

- (Malaysia) 1. Asbullah Mahamad
- (Malaysia) 22. Khairuddin Idris
- (Malaysia) Mohd Hamsani Ahmad

Defender:

- (Malaysia) 3. Faizal Zainal
- (Malaysia) 4. B. Rajinikandh
- (Malaysia) 5. K. Gunalan
- (Malaysia) 6. See Kim Seng
- (Malaysia) 15. Khairil Zainal
- (Malaysia) Ching Hong Aik

Midfielder:

- (Malaysia) 14. Aminuddin Hussein
- (Malaysia) 16. Idris Kadir
- (Slovakia) 20. Robert Bozik
- (Malaysia) 21. Naina Mohammad
- (Malaysia) 14. Shaari Said
- (Malaysia) M. Sivam

Attacker:

- (Malaysia) 7. Wong Kah Loon
- (Malaysia) 11. Sazali Nasir
- (Slovakia) 18. Marian Valach

=== Kits and sponsors ===
Manufacturer	Sponsor	Home	Away	Third
Adidas	Dunhill			

=== Competition ===
==== Premier League ====
Table standing:

1. Singapore - 59 PTS

2. Kedah - 57 PTS

3. Sarawak - 55 PTS

4. Sabah - 49 PTS

5. Pahang - 46 PTS

6. Selangor - 44 PTS

7. Terengganu - 43 PTS

8. Johor - 41 PTS

9. Kelantan - 40 PTS

10. Perak - 35 PTS

11. Kuala Lumpur - 33 PTS

12. Negeri Sembilan - 31 PTS

13. Malacca - 31 PTS

14. Perlis - 20 PTS

15. Pulau Pinang - 19 PTS

16. Brunei - 13 PTS

=== Statistic ===
Note:

- Pld = Played, W = Won, D = Drawn, L = Lost, F = Goals for, A = Goals against, Pts= Points, Pos = Position

1st or Champions 2nd or Runner-up 3rd place Promotion Relegation

Season	League									Cup				Asia		Note
Season	Division	Pld	W	D	L	F	A	Pts	Pos	Charity	Malaysia	FA	Challenge	Competition	Result	Note
1994	Liga Perdana	28	8	7	3	42	52	31	12th	—	—	—	—	—	—	

=== Achievement ===
Top scorer:

== 1995 Negeri Sembilan FA season ==
=== Squad ===
Coach: (Malaysia) M. Karathu

Goalkeeper:

- (Malaysia) Mohd Halim Napi

Defender:

- (Malaysia) 3. Faizal Zainal
- (Malaysia) 4. B. Rajinikandh
- (Malaysia) 15. Khairil Zainal
- (Malaysia) Ching Hong Aik

Midfielder:

- (Malaysia) 19. J. Killan
- (Malaysia) Rosli Omar
- (Malaysia) 16. Idris Kadir
- (Malaysia) M. Sivam

Attacker:

- (Malaysia) 9. Zami Mohd Noor
- (Malaysia) Azmi Mohamed
- (Malaysia) Wong Kah Loon

=== Kits and sponsors ===
Manufacturer	Sponsor	Home	Away	Third
Adidas	Dunhill			

=== Competition ===
==== Premier League ====
League Table:-

1.Pahang - 65 PTS (1995 Liga Perdana Champions)

2.Selangor - 54 PTS

3.Sarawak - 54 PTS

4.Kedah - 45 PTS

5.Sabah - 44 PTS

6.Johor - 42 PTS

7.Perak - 40 PTS

8.Terengganu - 39 PTS

9.Brunei - 36 PTS

10.Perlis - 32 PTS

11.Negeri Sembilan - 30 PTS

12.Kuala Lumpur - 28 PTS

13.Malacca - 26 PTS

14.Pulau Pinang - 24 PTS

15.Kelantan - 23 PTS

=== Statistic ===
Note:

- Pld = Played, W = Won, D = Drawn, L = Lost, F = Goals for, A = Goals against, Pts= Points, Pos = Position

1st or Champions 2nd or Runner-up 3rd place Promotion Relegation

Season	League									Cup				Asia		Note
Season	Division	Pld	W	D	L	F	A	Pts	Pos	Charity	Malaysia	FA	Challenge	Competition	Result	Note
1995	Liga Perdana	28	8	6	14	31	45	30	11th	—	—	—	—	—	—	

=== Achievement ===
Top scorer:

== 1996 Negeri Sembilan FA season ==
=== Squad ===
Coach: (Malaysia) M. Karathu

Goalkeeper:

- (Malaysia) 1. S. Rajkumar
- (Malaysia) 21. Othman Katmon
- (Malaysia) 22. Mohd Yazid Mohd Yassin

Defender:

- (Malaysia) 2. Shamsul Akmar Japperi
- (Malaysia) 3. Faizal Zainal
- (Malaysia) 4. B. Rajinikandh
- (Malaysia) 11. Mohd Faris Ahmad
- (Malaysia) 15. Khairil Zainal
- (Malaysia) 17. A. Ganeson

Midfielder:

- (Malaysia) 5. Ching Hong Aik
- (Malaysia) 7. P. Nantha Gobalan
- (Malaysia) 8. Rosli Omar
- (Malaysia) 9. Zami Mohd Nor
- (Malaysia) 12. M. Balan
- (Malaysia) 16. Idris Kadir
- (Malaysia) 20. J. Christie
- (Malaysia) Md Nor Sheikh Ibrahim
- (Malaysia) Norashid Nordin

Attacker:

- (Australia) 10. Gustavo Cerro
- (Malaysia) 14. Mohd Armi Sharif
- (Argentina) 18. Jose Iriarte
- (Malaysia) 19. Azmi Mohamed
- (Malaysia) V. Gunalan
- (Malaysia) V.Arumugam

=== Kits and sponsors ===
Manufacturer	Sponsor	Home	Away	Third
Adidas	Dunhill			

=== Competition ===
==== Premier League ====
League Table:-

1.Sabah - 58 PTS (1996 Liga Perdana Champions)

2.Kedah - 57 PTS

3.Negeri Sembilan - 57 PTS

4.Selangor - 49 PTS

5.Brunei - 44 PTS

6.Pulau Pinang - 41 PTS

7.Sarawak - 40 PTS

8.Perak - 40 PTS

9.Johor - 37 PTS

10.Perlis - 36 PTS

11.Pahang - 33 PTS

12.Malacca - 27 PTS

13.Terengganu - 20 PTS

14.Kuala Lumpur - 18 PTS

15.Kelantan - 17 PTS

==== Malaysia Cup ====
Group B

Sarawak 8 6 0 2 16- 6 18

Brunei 8 4 1 3 10-14 13

Kedah 8 4 0 4 17-13 12

Johor 8 2 2 4 5-10 8

Negri Sembilan 8 2 1 5 6-11 7

Round 1 [Oct 26]

Sarawak 5-0 Negri Sembilan

Round 2 [Oct 29]

Negri Sembilan 4-0 Brunei

Round 3 [Nov 2]

Johor 1-0 Negri Sembilan

Round 4 [Nov 5]

Negri Sembilan 2-1 Kedah

Round 5 [Nov 12]

No match for Negri Sembilan

Round 6 [Nov 16]

Negri Sembilan 0-1 Sarawak

Round 7 [Nov 20]

Brunei 2-0 Negri Sembilan

Round 8 [Nov 23]

Negri Sembilan 0-0 Johor

Round 9 [Nov 30]

Kedah 1-0 Negri Sembilan

Round 10 [Dec 7]

No match for Negri Sembilan

=== Statistic ===
Note:

- Pld = Played, W = Won, D = Drawn, L = Lost, F = Goals for, A = Goals against, Pts= Points, Pos = Position

1st or Champions 2nd or Runner-up 3rd place Promotion Relegation

Season	League									Cup				Asia		Note
Season	Division	Pld	W	D	L	F	A	Pts	Pos	Charity	Malaysia	FA	Challenge	Competition	Result	Note
1996	Liga Perdana	28	17	6	5	46	23	57	3rd	—	Group stage	—	—	—	—	

=== Achievement ===
Top scorer:

== 1997 Negeri Sembilan FA season ==
=== Squad ===
Coach: (Malaysia) M. Karathu

Goalkeeper:

- (Malaysia) 1. V. Murugan
- (Malaysia) 21. Othman Katmon
- (Malaysia) 22. Mohd Yazid Mohd Yassin
- (Malaysia) Mohd Halim Napi

Defender:

- (Malaysia) 3. Faizal Zainal
- (Malaysia) 4. B. Rajinikandh
- (Malaysia) 5. Ching Hong Aik
- (Malaysia) 13. Mohd Nor Sheikh Ismail
- (Malaysia) 15. Khairil Zainal
- (Malaysia) 17. A. Ganeson
- (Malaysia) Mohd Zaidi Mohd Hafiah

Midfielder:

- (Malaysia) 6. Idris Kadir
- (Malaysia) 8. Rosli Omar
- (Malaysia) 9. Zami Mohd Noor
- (Malaysia) 10. Shamsul Akmar Japperi
- (Malaysia) 12. M. Balan
- (Malaysia) 19. Azmi Mohamed
- (Malaysia) 20. Christe Joseph
- (Brazil) Airton Andrioli
- (Australia) 11. Gustavo Cerro
- (Malaysia) 16. Shamsul Akmar

Attacker:

- (Argentina) 11. Julio Hector Ceballos
- (Argentina) 18. Jose Iriarte
- (Australia) 10. Tristam Morgan

=== Kits and sponsors ===
Manufacturer	Sponsor	Home	Away	Third
Adidas	Dunhill			

=== Competition ===
==== Premier League ====
League Table:-

1.Sarawak - 54 PTS (1997 Liga Perdana Champions)

2.Kedah - 50 PTS

3.Sabah - 49 PTS

4.Selangor - 46 PTS

5.Brunei - 45 PTS

6.Perlis - 45 PTS

7.Negeri Sembilan - 44 PTS

8.Perak - 41 PTS

9.Kuala Lumpur - 38 PTS

10.Pahang - 37 PTS

11.Pulau Pinang - 33 PTS

12.Johor - 32 PTS (Relegated to 1998 Liga Perdana 2)

13.Kelantan - 28 PTS (Relegated to 1998 Liga Perdana 2)

14.Malacca - 24 PTS (Relegated to 1998 Liga Perdana 2)

15.Terengganu - 22 PTS (Relegated to 1998 Liga Perdana 2)

==== Malaysia Cup ====
Group A

1.Selangor 8 5 1 2 13- 6 16

2.Brunei 8 4 1 3 11-12 13

3.Negri Sembilan 8 3 1 4 12-14 10

4.Kuala Lumpur 8 3 1 4 10-12 10

5.Kedah 8 3 0 5 13-15 9

Round 1 [Oct 25]

No match for Negeri Sembilan

Round 2 [Oct 28]

Negri Sembilan 2-0 Kedah

Round 3 [Nov 1]

Negri Sembilan 0-2 Selangor

Round 4 [Nov 4]

Kuala Lumpur 0-0 Negri Sembilan

Round 5 [Nov 8]

Brunei 3-1 Negri Sembilan

Round 6 [Nov 15]

No match for Negeri Sembilan

Round 7 [Nov 18]

Kedah 4-3 Negri Sembilan

Round 8 [Nov 22]

Selangor 1-2 Negri Sembilan

Round 9 [Nov 25]

Negri Sembilan 3-2 Kuala Lumpur

Round 10 [Nov 30]

Negri Sembilan 1-2 Brunei

==== FA Cup ====
1st round= bye

2nd round

[1st leg Apr 12/13]

Negri Sembilan 2-0 Sabah

[2nd leg Apr 22/23]

Negri Sembilan 1-1 Sabah

Quarterfinals

[1st leg May 13]

Selangor 1-1 Negri Sembilan

[2nd May 27]

Selangor 4-2 Negri Sembilan

=== Statistic ===
Note:

- Pld = Played, W = Won, D = Drawn, L = Lost, F = Goals for, A = Goals against, Pts= Points, Pos = Position

1st or Champions 2nd or Runner-up 3rd place Promotion Relegation

Season	League									Cup				Asia		Note
Season	Division	Pld	W	D	L	F	A	Pts	Pos	Charity	Malaysia	FA	Challenge	Competition	Result	Note
1997	Liga Perdana	28	12	8	8	40	31	44	7th	—	Group stage	Quarter-finals	—	—	—	

=== Achievement ===
Top scorer:

== 1998 Negeri Sembilan FA season ==
=== Squad ===
Coach: (Malaysia) M. Karathu

Goalkeeper:

- (Malaysia) 21. Othman Katmon
- (Malaysia) 22. Mohd Yazid Mohd Yassin
- (Malaysia) Mohd Halim Napi
- (Malaysia) Mohd Hamsani Ahmad

Defender:

- (Malaysia) 3. Faizal Zainal
- (Malaysia) 4. B. Rajinikandh
- (Malaysia) 5. Ching Hong Aik
- (Brazil) 6. Pedro Paulo Oliveira
- (Malaysia) 15. Khairil Zainal
- (Malaysia) A. Ganeson

Midfielder:

- (Malaysia) 8. Rosli Omar
- (Australia) 20. Guss Cerro
- (Malaysia) Ahmad Shahrul Azhar Sofian
- (Malaysia) Norhisham Ismail
- (Malaysia) Abdul Halim Jantan
- (Malaysia) Efendi Abdul Malek

Attacker:

- (Malaysia) 9. Dollah Salleh
- (Australia) 10. Scott Ollerenshaw
- (Malaysia) 13. Zami Mohd Noor
- (Malaysia) 14. Affendi Julaihi

=== Kits and sponsors ===
Manufacturer	Sponsor	Home	Away	Third
Adidas	Dunhill			

=== Competition ===
==== Premier 1 ====
League Table:-

1.Penang - 41 PTS (1998 Liga Perdana 1 Champions)

2.Pahang - 40 PTS

3.Brunei - 35 PTS

4.Kedah - 34 PTS

5.Sabah - 31 PTS

6.Sarawak - 30 PTS

7.Perak - 29 PTS

8.Kuala Lumpur - 29 PTS

9.Negeri Sembilan - 27 PTS

10.Selangor - 25 PTS (Relegated to Liga Perdana 2)

11.Perlis - 25 PTS (Relegated to Liga Perdana 2)

12.Olympic 2000 - 18 PTS (Relegated to Liga Perdana 2)

==== Malaysia Cup ====
Group A

Negeri Sembilan 8 6 1 1 17- 8 19

Terengganu 8 4 1 3 9- 6 13

Penang 8 4 1 3 11-10 13

Kuala Lumpur 8 2 1 5 5-11 7

Kedah 8 1 2 5 5-12 5

Semi Finals

1st Legs

Perak 2-2 Negeri Sembilan

2nd Legs

Perak 1-0 Negeri Sembilan

==== FA Cup ====
First round= bye

2nd round

[1st leg May 19]

Negeri Sembilan 1-1 Malacca

[2nd leg Jun 9]

Negeri Sembilan 1-4 Malacca

=== Statistic ===
Note:

- Pld = Played, W = Won, D = Drawn, L = Lost, F = Goals for, A = Goals against, Pts= Points, Pos = Position

1st or Champions 2nd or Runner-up 3rd place Promotion Relegation

Season	League									Cup				Asia		Note
Season	Division	Pld	W	D	L	F	A	Pts	Pos	Charity	Malaysia	FA	Challenge	Competition	Result	Note
1998	Liga Perdana 1	22	7	6	9	24	28	27	9th	—	Semi-finals	2nd round	—	—	—	

=== Achievement ===
Top scorer:

== 1999 Negeri Sembilan FA season ==
=== Squad ===
Coach: (Malaysia) Irfan Bakti Abu Salim

Goalkeeper:

- (Malaysia) 22. Yazid Yassin
- (Malaysia) Suffian Rahman
- (Malaysia) Mohd Hamsani Ahmad
- (Malaysia) Azmin Azram Abdul Aziz

Defender:

- (Malaysia) 3. Faizal Zainal
- (Malaysia) 4. B. Rajinikandh
- (Malaysia) 5. Khairul Anuar Baharom
- (Malaysia) 6. Shamsul Akmar Japperi
- (Malaysia) 9. Ching Hong Aik
- (Malaysia) 12. Leong Hong Seng
- (Malaysia) 14. Mohd Nor Sheikh Ismail
- (Malaysia) 15. Khairil Zainal

Midfielder:

- (Malaysia) 8. Adnan Mohd. Zain
- (Malaysia) 11. Ahmad Shahrul Azhar Sofian
- (Malaysia) 13. Zami Mohd Noor
- (Malaysia) 23. Chow Chee Weng
- (Malaysia) Abdul Halim Jantan
- (Malaysia) Tuan Kamree Tuan Yahya
- (Malaysia) Nor Isham Ismail

Attacker:

- (Malaysia) 17. Mohd Rizal Hassan
- (Malaysia) 20. Efendi Abdul Malek
- (Malaysia) Azmi Mohamed

=== Kits and sponsors ===
Manufacturer	Sponsor	Home	Away	Third
Adidas	Dunhill			

=== Competition ===
==== Premier 1 ====
League Table:-

1.Pahang - 34 PTS (1999 Liga Perdana 1 Champions)

2.Penang - 31 PTS

3.Negeri Sembilan - 29 PTS

4.Sabah - 29 PTS

5.Kuala Lumpur - 28 PTS

6.Sarawak - 27 PTS

7.Brunei - 25 PTS

8.Terengganu - 23 PTS

9.Perak - 23 PTS

10.Kedah - 21 PTS (Relegated to Liga Perdana 2)

==== Malaysia Cup ====
Group A

1.Terengganu 10 6 1/0 3 14-12 20 Qualified

2.Negeri Sembilan 10 5 1/0 4 16-13 17 Qualified

3.Perak 10 5 0/1 4 19-13 16

4.Perlis 10 4 1/1 5 10-15 15

5.Selangor 10 3 1/1 5 14-19 12

6.Pinang 10 3 0/1 6 14-15 10

Round 1 [Sep 25]

Terengganu 1-0 Negeri Sembilan

Round 2 [Sep 28]

Negeri Sembilan 0-0 Perlis

Round 3 [Oct 2]

Selangor 1-2 Negeri Sembilan

Round 4 [Oct 9]

Perak 2-1 Negeri Sembilan

Round 5 [Oct 16]

Negeri Sembilan 1-0 Pinang

Round 6 [Oct 23]

Negeri Sembilan 2-3 Terengganu

Round 7 [Oct 30]

Perlis 3-2 Negeri Sembilan

Round 8 [Nov 2]

Perlis 3-2 Negeri Sembilan

Round 9 [Nov 9]

Negeri Sembilan 2-1 Perak

Round 10 [Nov 13]

Pinang 1-4 Negeri Sembilan

Semifinals

First Legs [Nov 21]

Brunei 3-0 Negeri Sembilan

Second Legs [Nov 27]

Negeri Sembilan 3-1 Brunei

==== FA Cup ====
First round= bye

2nd round

1st Legs [Apr 20]

Negeri Sembilan 2-2 NS Chempaka

2nd Legs [May 4]

Negeri Sembilan 1-0 NS Chempaka

Quarterfinals

1st Legs [May 25/26]

Negeri Sembilan 3-0 Pahang

2nd Legs [Jun 1/2]

Negeri Sembilan 3-1 Pahang

Semifinals

1st Legs [Jun 15]

Terengganu 2-0 Negeri Sembilan

2nd Legs [Jun 26]

Terengganu 1-0 Negeri Sembilan

=== Statistic ===
Note:

- Pld = Played, W = Won, D = Drawn, L = Lost, F = Goals for, A = Goals against, Pts= Points, Pos = Position

1st or Champions 2nd or Runner-up 3rd place Promotion Relegation

Season	League									Cup				Asia		Note
Season	Division	Pld	W	D	L	F	A	Pts	Pos	Charity	Malaysia	FA	Challenge	Competition	Result	Note
1999	Liga Perdana 1	18	7	6	5	31	28	29	3rd	—	Semi-finals	Semi-final	—	—	—	

=== Achievement ===
Top scorer:
