= List of Negeri Sembilan FC records and statistics =

The List of Negeri Sembilan FC records and statistics provides a comprehensive overview of the major records and statistical data associated with Negeri Sembilan Football Club, a professional football club based in Seremban, Malaysia. The article outlines the club’s historical performance in officially recognised domestic football competitions.

The page documents team and individual records, season-by-season league and cup performances, as well as head-to-head statistics against other clubs. The information presented is compiled from reliable sources and is intended to serve as a factual reference for the club’s competitive history.

== Coaches ==
=== Since 1990 ===
The following are the statistics for coaches from 1990 onwards:

Coach	Season		League Record						Major Titles	Domestic			
Coach	From	Until	Pld	W	D	L	GF	GA	Major Titles	ML	MC	FA	PS
(Malaysia) Ruslan Yaakob	1990	1991	28	17	4	7	48	50	1	1	—	—	—
(Slovakia) Jozef Herel	1992	1993	36	10	8	18	68	31	—	—	—	—	—
(Malaysia) M. Karathu	1994	1998	134	52	33	39	183	178	—	—	—	—	—
(Malaysia) Irfan Bakti Abu Salim	1999	—	18	7	6	5	31	28	—	—	—	—	—
(Malaysia) Mohd Zaki Sheikh Ahmad	2000	2002	70	21	13	36	89	126	—	—	—	—	—

=== Since 2003 ===
Most of Negeri Sembilan’s major trophies were won after K. Devan took charge of the team in 2003. He was named the Most Favourite Coach for the 2005–06 season, during which Negeri Sembilan won the Malaysia Super League. Here are the statistics for all head coaches since 2003:

Coach	Period		League Record									Major Titles	Domestic			
Coach	From	Until	Pld	W	W%	D	D%	L	L%	GF	GA	Major Titles	ML	MC	FA	PS
(Malaysia) K. Devan	1 Jan 2003	30 Nov 2006	88	50	56.82%	19	21.6%	19	21.6%	175	96	2	1	—	1	—
(Tunisia) Hatem Souissi	1 Dec 2006	31 Oct 2007	24	6	25%	6	25%	12	50%	29	46	—	—	—	—	—
(Malaysia) Wan Jamak Wan Hassan	1 Nov 2007	17 Mac 2011	83	39	46.99%	16	19.28%	28	33.73%	138	105	2	—	1	1	—
(Malaysia) Azraai Khor	21 Mac 2011	22 Nov 2012	45	15	33.33%	15	33.33%	15	33.33%	64	61	2	—	1	—	1
(Portugal) Divaldo Alves	23 Nov 2012	13 May 2013	15	0	0%	7	46.67%	8	53.33%	7	15	—	—	—	—	—
(Malaysia) Ridzuan Abu Shah (caretaker)	14 May 2013	31 Oct 2013	7	1	14.29%	0	0%	6	85.71%	4	13	—	—	—	—	—
(Singapore) V. Sundramoorthy	1 Nov 2013	4 Nov 2014	22	8	36.36%	6	27.27%	8	36.36%	26	28	—	—	—	—	—
(Malaysia) K. Devan	5 Nov 2014	22 Nov 2015	22	8	36.36%	8	36.36%	6	27.27%	33	28	—	—	—	—	—
(Australia) Gary Michael Phillips	23 Nov 2015	2 Nov 2016	22	9	40.91%	8	36.36%	5	22.73%	40	26	—	—	—	—	—
(Malaysia) Asri Ninggal	3 Nov 2016	20 Dec 2017	22	11	50%	8	36.36%	3	13.64%	37	24	—	—	—	—	—
(Germany) Jörg Steinebrunner	21 Dec 2017	27 Feb 2018	4	1	25%	0	0%	3	75%	3	6	—	—	—	—	—
(Malaysia) Azraai Khor	28 Feb 2018	10 May 2018	5	0	0%	2	40%	3	60%	5	14	—	—	—	—	—
(Portugal) Mário Lemos	11 May 2018	5 Dec 2018	13	3	23.08%	1	7.69%	9	69.23%	9	27	—	—	—	—	—
(Malaysia) Mat Zan Mat Aris	6 Dec 2018	15 Dec 2019	20	8	40%	5	25%	7	35%	29	25	—	—	—	—	—
(Malaysia) Sazali Saidon	16 Dec 2019	30 Nov 2020	11	3	27.27%	2	18.18%	6	54.54%	12	20	—	—	—	—	—
(Malaysia) K. Devan	1 Dec 2020	29 Jan 2024	68	30	44.12%	19	27.94%	19	27.94%	99	91	1	1	—	—	—
(Malaysia) Azzmi Aziz	15 Feb 2024	14 Aug 2024	7	1	14.29%	0	0%	6	85.71%	5	17	—	—	—	—	—
(Malaysia) K. Nanthakumar	15 Aug 2024	31 May 2025	17	3	17.65%	4	23.53%	10	58.82%	18	32	—	—	—	—	—
(Malaysia) Nidzam Jamil	1 Jun 2025	23 Feb 2026	16	4	25%	5	31.25%	7	43.75%	21	23	—	—	—	—	—
(Malaysia) K. Rajan (Interim)	23 Feb 2026	31 May 2026	8	2	25%	6	75%	0	0%	18	12	—	—	—	—	—
(Spain) Daniel Giménez	26 Jun 2026	Present	0	0	0%	0	0%	0	0%	0	0	—	—	—	—	—

=== Coach all-time ===
- Longest-serving coach: K. Devan, from 2003 to 2006, 2015 and 2021 to 2023. (8 seasons)
- Coach with most trophies: K. Devan, 3 (1 Malaysia Super League, 1 Malaysia FA Cup, 1 Malaysia Premier League)
- Coach with most league matches: K. Devan, 178 matches
- Coach with most league wins: K. Devan, 88 wins
- Coach with most league wins in a single season: M. Karathu, 17 wins (1996)
- Coach with most league points: K. Devan, 310 points
- Coach with most league points in a single season: M. Karathu, 57 points (1996)

== Players ==
=== Most titles ===
Zaquan Adha, Idris Abdul Karim, Abdul Halim Zainal, and Kaharuddin Rahman are among Negeri Sembilan’s most decorated players, each winning five major trophies with the club. Zaquan and Idris were part of the squad that won the Super League in 2005–06, the Malaysia Cup in 2009 and 2011, and the Malaysia FA Cup in 2010, while Zaquan added the Premier League in 2021, and Idris won the Charity Shield in 2012. Abdul Halim and Kaharuddin shared the same five titles: Malaysia Cup in 2009 and 2011, Malaysia FA Cup in 2010, Charity Shield in 2012, and Premier League in 2021.

List of players with the most titles that have been recorded.

Player	Title
(Malaysia) Zaquan Adha	5
(Malaysia) Idris Abdul Karim	5
(Malaysia) Abdul Halim Zainal	5
(Malaysia) Kaharuddin Rahman	5
(Malaysia) S. Kunanlan	4
(Malaysia) Shahurain Abu Samah	4
(Malaysia) Aidil Zafuan	4
(Malaysia) Ching Hong Aik	4
(Malaysia) Shukor Adan	4
(Malaysia) Mohd Rahman Zabul	4
(Malaysia) Tengku Qayyum	4
(Malaysia) Alif Samsudin	4

=== Most appearances ===
List of players with the most appearances that have been recorded.

Player	League	Other	Total
(Malaysia) Ching Hong Aik	N/A	N/A	260 (Note: Not official, probably he has more appearances.)
(Malaysia) Zaquan Adha	43 (Note: Appearances of 2021–2023)	8 (Note: Appearances of 2021–2023)	177 (Note: 2005–2011: 126 appearances, 2021–2023: 51 appearances)
(Malaysia) Abdul Halim Zainal	N/A	N/A	125
(Malaysia) A. Selvan	99	18	117
(Malaysia) Idris Abdul Karim	N/A	N/A	87
(Malaysia) Mohd Rahman Zabul	N/A	N/A	86

=== Most goals ===
List of players with the most goals that have been recorded.

Player	League	Other	Total
(Malaysia) Zaquan Adha	38 (Note: 2005–2011: 29 goals, 2021–2023: 9 goals)	34 (Note: 2005–2011: 33 goals, 2021–2023: 1 goal)	72 (Note: 2005–2011: 62 goals, 2021–2023: 10 goals)
(Cameroon) Christian Bekamenga	N/A	N/A	46
(Malaysia) Shahurain Abu Samah	N/A	N/A	33
(Malaysia) K. Rajan	N/A	N/A	31 (Note: Goals of 2002–2004)
(Cameroon) Jean-Emmanuel Effa Owona	19	8	27

=== Most goals by season ===
==== League ====
List of players with the most goals by season in league that have been recorded.

Season	Player	Goals
2004	(Malaysia) Shahrin Abdul Majid	11
2005	(Cameroon) Christian Bekamenga	16
2005–06	(Cameroon) Christian Bekamenga	8
2006–07	(Angola) Frederico Dos Santos	9
2007–08	(Malaysia) Zaquan Adha	11
2009	(Malaysia) Zaquan Adha	11
2010	(Malaysia) Zaquan Adha	8
2011	(Malaysia) Mohd Firdaus Azizul	7
2012	(Cameroon) Jean-Emmanuel Effa Owona	15
2013	(Malaysia) Shahurain Abu Samah (Malaysia) Rashid Mahmud (Malaysia) Nazrin Nawi	2
2014	(South Korea) Kim Jin-yong	8
2015	(Liberia) Francis Doe	17
2016	(Australia) Andrew Nabbout	8
2017	(Japan) Bruno Suzuki	11
2018	(Argentina) Nicolás Vélez (Brazil) Flávio Júnior	8
2019	(Brazil) José Almir Barros Neto	8
2020	(Brazil) Igor Luiz	5
2021	(Cameroon) Alain Akono	9
2022	(Brazil) Gustavo	11
2023	(Malaysia) Shahrel Fikri	6
2024–25	(Senegal) Jacque Faye	5
2025–26	(Ghana) Joseph Esso	10

==== All competition ====
List of players with the most goals by season in all competition that have been recorded.

Season	Player	Goals
2004	(Malaysia) Efendi Abdul Malek	12
2005	(Cameroon) Christian Bekamenga	21
2005–06	(Cameroon) Christian Bekamenga	19
2006–07	(Angola) Frederico Dos Santos	13
2007–08	(Malaysia) Zaquan Adha	14
2009	(Malaysia) Zaquan Adha	23
2010	(Malaysia) Zaquan Adha	14
2011	(Malaysia) Hairuddin Omar	11
2012	(Cameroon) Jean-Emmanuel Effa Owona	23
2013	(Brazil) Fábio Leandro Barbosa	6
2014	(South Korea) Kim Jin-yong	8
2015	(Liberia) Francis Doe	19
2016	(Australia) Andrew Nabbout	9
2017	(Japan) Bruno Suzuki	13
2018	(Brazil) Flávio Júnior	10
2019	(Brazil) Igor Luiz	12
2020	(Brazil) Igor Luiz	5
2021	(Cameroon) Alain Akono	9
2022	(Brazil) Gustavo	11
2023	(Malaysia) Shahrel Fikri (Brazil) Casagrande	7
2024–25	(Malaysia) Selvan Anbualagan	6
2025–26	(Ghana) Joseph Esso	12

=== Most loyal ===
List of players with the most loyal that have been recorded. The years include time with the Negeri Sembilan youth team.

Player	Years
(Malaysia) Ching Hong Aik	17
(Malaysia) Kaharuddin Rahman	15
(Malaysia) Norhafiz Zamani Misbah	15
(Malaysia) Efendi Abdul Malek	13
(Malaysia) Abdul Halim Zainal	12
(Malaysia) Zaquan Adha	11
(Malaysia) Mohd Rahman Zabul	11
(Malaysia) B. Rajinikandh	10
(Malaysia) Tengku Qayyum	10
(Malaysia) K. Thanaraj	10
(Malaysia) B. Sathianathan	9
(Malaysia) Khairil Zainal	9
(Malaysia) Idris Abdul Karim	9
(Malaysia) Hamsani Ahmad	9
(Malaysia) A. Selvan	9
(Malaysia) N. Javabilaarivin	9
(Malaysia) Shahurain Abu Samah	8
(Malaysia) Khairul Anuar Baharom	8
(Malaysia) Faizal Zainal	8
(Malaysia) Shukor Adan	8
(Malaysia) Aidil Zafuan	8
(Malaysia) Alif Samsudin	8

=== Foreign players ===
==== Country by the number of players ====
This list shows the top contributing countries by the number of foreign players who have played for the club.

Country	Flag	FW	MF	DF	GK	Total
Angola	(Angola)	1	—	—	—	1
Argentina	(Argentina)	5	2	—	—	7
Australia	(Australia)	4	2	2	—	8
Bosnia and Herzegovina	(Bosnia and Herzegovina)	1	—	—	—	1
Brazil	(Brazil)	10	4	5	—	19
Cameroon	(Cameroon)	4	—	1	—	5
Croatia	(Croatia)	2	—	—	—	2
Czech Republic	(Czech Republic)	2	—	—	—	2
England	(England)	—	4	—	—	4 (Note: Two players played before 1989, likely unofficial.)
Equartorial Guinea	(Equatorial Guinea)	—	—	1	—	1
France	(France)	2	—	1	—	3
Gabon	(Gabon)	—	1	—	—	1
Ghana	(Ghana)	1	2	—	—	3
Haiti	(Haiti)	—	1	—	—	1
Italy	(Italy)	—	1	—	—	1
Japan	(Japan)	2	4	1	—	7
Kenya	(Kenya)	1	—	—	—	1
Laos	(Laos)	1	—	—	—	1
Latvia	(Latvia)	—	—	1	—	1
Liberia	(Liberia)	2	—	1	—	3
Mauritania	(Mauritania)	1	—	—	—	1
Mongolia	(Mongolia)	—	—	1	—	1
Myanmar	(Myanmar)	1	1	—	—	2
Netherland	(Netherlands)	—	1	—	—	1
Nigeria	(Nigeria)	3	2	1	1	7
Palestine	(Palestine)	—	2	—	—	2
Philippines	(Philippines)	1	1	—	—	2
Russia	(Russia)	1	—	—	—	1
Saint Vincent	(Saint Vincent and the Grenadines)	1	—	—	—	1
Senegal	(Senegal)	—	1	—	—	1
Serbia	(Serbia)	—	—	1	—	1
Sierra Leone	(Sierra Leone)	1	1	—	—	2
Singapore	(Singapore)	1	1	2	—	4
Slovakia	(Slovakia)	2	1	3	—	6
South Africa	(South Africa)	1	—	—	—	1
South Korea	(South Korea)	1	4	1	—	6
Spain	(Spain)	3	—	—	—	3
Switzerland	(Switzerland)	—	—	1	—	1
Thailand	(Thailand)	1	1	—	—	2
Togo	(Togo)	2	—	—	—	2
USA	(United States)	—	1	—	—	1
Yugoslavia	(Socialist Federal Republic of Yugoslavia)	2	—	—	—	2
Zambia	(Zambia)	—	1	—	—	1
Total		60	39	23	1	124

== Honours ==
Negeri Sembilan have won 9 major trophies.

Negeri Sembilan honours
Type	Competition	Titles	Seasons
Domestic	Malaysia Super League	1	2005–06
Domestic	Semi-Pro League 2 / Premier League	2	1991, 2021
Domestic	Malaysia Cup	3	1948, 2009, 2011
Domestic	Malaysia FA Cup	2	2003, 2010
Domestic	Malaysia Charity Cup	1	2012

=== National competitions ===
- Malaysia Super League
  - Champions (1): 2005–06
  - Runner-up (1): 2007–08
- Semi-Pro League 2 / Premier League
  - Champions (2): 1991, 2021
  - Runner-up (1): 2005
- FAM Cup
  - Runner-up (1): 1956
- Malaysia Cup
  - Champions (3): 1948, 2009, 2011
  - Runner-up (3): 2000, 2006, 2010
  - Semi-finals (2): 1998, 1999
  - Quarter-finals (6): 2004, 2007, 2012, 2016, 2022, 2024–25
  - Round of 16 (1): 2023
  - 3rd round (1): 2001
  - Group stage (12): 1991, 1992, 1996, 1997, 2003, 2005, 2008, 2013, 2017, 2019, 2020, 2021
  - Play-off (2): 2014, 2015
- Malaysia FA Cup
  - Champions (2): 2003, 2010
  - Semi-finals (5): 1993, 1999, 2006, 2009, 2017
  - Quarter-finals (6): 1997, 2000, 2001, 2004, 2013, 2023, 2025
  - Round of 16 (1): 2024
  - 3rd round (1): 2016
  - 2nd round (9): 1998, 2002, 2007, 2008, 2011, 2015, 2018, 2019, 2020
  - 1st round (7): 1990, 1991, 1992, 2005, 2012, 2014, 2022
- Charity Cup
  - Champions (1): 2012
  - Runner-up (2): 2004, 2010
- Challenge Cup
  - Group stage (1): 2018

=== International competitions ===
- AFC Cup
  - Group stage (2): 2004, 2007
  - Withdrew (1): 2010

=== Regional competitions ===
- King's Gold Cup
  - Champions (2): 1992, 2015
  - Runner-up (1): 1953
- Federal Territory Minister Cup
  - Champions (1): 2022

=== International friendly competitions ===
- Asean Charity Shield (vs Buriram United)
  - Runner-up (1): 2022
- Piala Serumpun
  - Champions (2): 2025 (Note: vs Semen Pandang), 2026 (Note: vs Hougang United)

=== Negeri Sembilan U21 ===
- President's Cup
  - Champions (2): 2001, 2002
  - Runner-up (2): 1993, 2023

=== Negeri Sembilan Women's ===
- FAS Women's Super League
  - Champions (1): 2021–22

=== Negeri Sembilan Women's U16 ===
- Division 1 Liga Puteri
  - Runner-up (1): 2025

== Season-by-season records ==
Updated on 12 May 2025

Note:

- Pld = Played, W = Won, D = Drawn, L = Lost, F = Goals for, A = Goals against, Pts= Points, Pos = Position

1st or Champions 2nd or Runner-up 3rd place Promotion Relegation

Season	League									Cup				Asia		Note
Season	Division	Pld	W	D	L	F	A	Pts	Pos	Charity	Malaysia	FA	Challenge	Competition	Result	Note
1982	Liga Malaysia									—	—	—	—	—	—	
1983	Liga Malaysia	15	4	3	8	17	31	11	13th	—	—	—	—	—	—	
1984	Liga Malaysia	15	7	1	7	16	22	22	9th	—	—	—	—	—	—	
1985	Liga Malaysia	15	3	0	12	15	36	9	15th	—	—	—	—	—	—	
1986	Liga Malaysia	15	5	0	10	13	29	15	12th	—	—	—	—	—	—	
1987	Liga Malaysia	16	1	2	13	10	45	5	16th	—	—	—	—	—	—	
1988	Liga Malaysia	16	6	5	5	18	19	23	10th	—	—	—	—	—	—	
1989	Liga Semi-Pro 2	14	4	2	8	13	22	14	7th	—	—	—	—	—	—	
1990	Liga Semi-Pro 2	14	8	2	4	20	40	18	3rd	—	—	1st round	—	—	—	
1991	Liga Semi-Pro 2	14	9	2	3	28	10	19	1st	—	Group stage	1st round	—	—	—	
1992	Liga Semi-Pro 1	18	7	6	5	23	22	20	3rd	—	Group stage	1st round	—	—	—	
1993	Liga Semi-Pro 1	18	3	2	13	24	46	11	10th	—	—	Semi-finals	—	—	—	
1994	Liga Perdana	28	8	7	3	42	52	31	12th	—	—	—	—	—	—	
1995	Liga Perdana	28	8	6	14	31	45	30	11th	—	—	—	—	—	—	
1996	Liga Perdana	28	17	6	5	46	23	57	3rd	—	Group stage	—	—	—	—	
1997	Liga Perdana	28	12	8	8	40	31	44	7th	—	Group stage	Quarter-finals	—	—	—	
1998	Liga Perdana 1	22	7	6	9	24	28	27	9th	—	Semi-finals	2nd round	—	—	—	
1999	Liga Perdana 1	18	7	6	5	31	28	29	3rd	—	Semi-finals	Semi-final	—	—	—	
2000	Liga Perdana 1	22	10	3	9	32	26	33	6th	—	Runner-up	Quarter-finals	—	—	—	
2001	Liga Perdana 1	22	7	6	9	32	39	27	8th	—	3rd round	Quarter-finals	—	—	—	
2002	Liga Perdana 1	26	4	4	18	25	61	16	14th	—	—	2nd round	—	—	—	
2003	Liga Perdana 2	22	12	6	4	59	28	42	2nd	—	Group stage	Champions	—	—	—	
2004	Premier League	24	10	8	6	45	35	38	4th	Runner-up	Quarter-finals	Quarter-finals	—	AFC Cup	Group stage	
2005	Premier League	21	16	1	4	45	19	49	1st	—	Group stage	1st round	—	—	—	
2005–06	Super League	21	12	4	5	26	14	40	1st	—	Runner-up	Semi-finals	—	—	—	
2006–07	Super League	24	6	6	12	29	46	24	11th	—	Quarter-finals	2nd round	—	AFC Cup	Group stage	
2007–08	Super League	24	14	6	4	48	30	48	2nd	—	Group stage	2nd round	—	—	—	
2009	Super League	26	11	5	10	44	35	38	7th	—	Champions	Semi-finals	—	—	—	
2010	Super League	26	11	5	10	40	31	38	6th	Runner-up	Runner-up	Champions	—	—	—	
2011	Super League	26	8	8	10	29	32	32	8th	—	Champions	2nd round	—	—	—	
2012	Super League	26	10	7	9	41	38	38	6th	Champions	Quarter-finals	1st round	—	—	—	
2013	Super League	22	1	7	14	11	28	10	12th	—	Group stage	Quarter-finals	—	—	—	
2014	Premier League	22	8	6	8	26	28	30	6th	—	Play-off	1st round	—	—	—	
2015	Premier League	22	8	8	6	33	28	32	6th	—	Play-off	2nd round	—	—	—	
2016	Premier League	22	9	8	5	40	26	35	4th	—	Quarter-finals	3rd round	—	—	—	
2017	Premier League	22	11	8	3	37	24	41	5th	—	Group stage	Semi-finals	—	—	—	
2018	Super League	22	4	3	15	27	47	15	12th	—	—	2nd round	Group stage	—	—	
2019	Premier League	20	8	5	7	29	25	29	6th	—	Group stage	2nd round	—	—	—	
2020	Premier League	11	3	2	6	12	20	11	11th	—	Group stage	2nd round	—	—	—	
2021	Premier League	20	12	5	3	33	16	41	1st	—	Group stage	—	—	—	—	
2022	Super League	22	12	5	5	33	26	41	4th	—	Quarter-finals	1st round	—	—	—	
2023	Super League	26	6	9	11	33	49	27	9th	—	Round of 16	Quarter-finals	—	—	—	
2024–25	Super League	24	4	4	16	23	49	16	12th	—	Quarter-finals	Round of 16	—	—	—	
2025–26	Super League	24	6	11	7	39	35	29	7th	—	Quarter-finals	Quarter-finals	—	—	—	

=== League records since 1983 ===
Data as of the end of the 2025–26 season.

==== Seasons ====
- Most season in Liga Malaysia (tier 1): 8
- Most season in Liga Semi-Pro 1 (tier 1): 2
- Most season in Liga Semi-Pro 2 (tier 2): 3
- Most season in Liga Perdana (tier 1): 4
- Most season in Liga Perdana 1 (tier 1): 5
- Most season in Liga Perdana 2 (tier 2): 1
- Most season in Malaysia Super League (tier 1): 13
- Most season in Malaysia Premier League (tier 2): 9

==== Titles ====
- Most Liga Semi-Pro 2 titles won: 1
- Most Malaysia Super League titles won: 1
- Most Malaysia Premier League titles won: 1

==== Points ====
- Most league points: 1,209
- Most league points in a season: 57 (1996)

==== Wins, draws and losses ====
- Most league wins: 331
- Most wins in a single season: 17 (1996)
- Most league draws: 214
- Most draws in a single season: 11 (2025–26)
- Most league losses: 348
- Fewest losses in a single season: 3 (1991, 1994, 2017, 2021)
- Most losses in a single season: 18 (2002)

==== Goals ====
- Most league goals scored: 1,282
- Most goals scored in a single season: 59 (2003)
- Most league goals conceded: 1,364
- Fewest goals conceded in a single season: 10 (1991)
- Most goals conceded in a single season: 61 (2002)

==== Matches ====
- Most league matches: 837

==== Position in league ====
- 1st place (3): 1991, 2005–06, 2021
- 2nd place (3): 2003, 2005, 2007–08
- 3rd place (4): 1990, 1992, 1996, 1999
- 4th place (3): 2004, 2016, 2022
- 5th place (1): 2017
- 6th place (6): 2000, 2010, 2012, 2014, 2015, 2019
- 7th place (4): 1989, 1997, 2009, 2025–26
- 8th place (2): 2001, 2011
- 9th place (3): 1984, 1998, 2023
- 10th place (2): 1988, 1993
- 11th place (3): 1995, 2006–07, 2020
- 12th place (5): 1986, 1994, 2013, 2018, 2024–25
- 13th place (1): 1983
- 14th place (1): 2002
- 15th place (1): 1985
- 16th place (1): 1987
- Last place (3): 2002 (14th), 2013 (12th), 2018 (12th)

== Continental ==
At the continental level, clubs across Asia compete in tournaments based on the ranking and status of their domestic leagues. The AFC Champions League Elite (ACLE) is Asia’s top-tier club competition featuring the best teams from the continent’s highest-ranked leagues. Below it is the AFC Champions League Two (ACL2), the second-tier tournament for clubs from developing football nations, followed by the AFC Challenge League (ACGL) as the third tier. Prior to the 2024–25 restructuring, ACL2 was known as the AFC Cup, which ran from 2004 to 2023. Negeri Sembilan represented Malaysia in the inaugural AFC Cup in 2004 and again in 2007, but withdrew from the 2010 edition despite qualifying.

=== Continental record ===
- AFC Cup
  2004: Group stage
  2007: Group stage
  2010: Withdrew

=== Continental matches ===
Season	Competition	Round	Club	Home	Away	Agg/Pos
2004	AFC Cup	Group stage (Group E)	(Maldives) Island FC	6–0	0–1	3rd out of 4
2004	AFC Cup	Group stage (Group E)	(India) East Bengal	2–1	2–4	3rd out of 4
2004	AFC Cup	Group stage (Group E)	(Singapore) Geylang United	0–1	1–2	3rd out of 4
2007	AFC Cup	Group stage (Group D)	(Vietnam) Hoa Phat Hanoi	0–0	0–0	2nd out of 4 (Note: Two best runners-up, one from groups A, B and C and one from groups D, E and F, qualify for the quarter-finals. The club only got 7 points and didn't qualified for the next round.)
2007	AFC Cup	Group stage (Group D)	(Maldives) Victory SC	1–1	2–2	2nd out of 4
2007	AFC Cup	Group stage (Group D)	(Hong Kong) Sun Hei	1–0	0–2	2nd out of 4
2010	AFC Cup	Withdrew (Note: Qualified for the AFC Cup after winning the 2009 Malaysia Cup, but withdrew due to internal reasons.)				

=== Other continental records ===
==== AFC Cup ====
- Most competition in AFC Cup: 2
- Most wins in AFC Cup: 3
- Most wins in single competition: 2 (2004)
- Biggest AFC Cup victory: 6–0 vs Island City (10 February 2004)
- Biggest AFC Cup losses: 2–4 vs East Bengal (25 February 2004)
- Most AFC Cup goals scored: 15
- Most AFC Cup goals scored in a single competition: 11 (2004)
- Fewest goals conceded in a single competition: 5 (2007)
- Topscorer
  - Alfred Effiong (3 goals)
  - Freddy (3 goals)

== All-time ==
=== Malaysia Super League ===
Statistics are accurate as of the end of the 2025–26 Malaysia Super League season.

==== Seasons ====
- Most season in Super League: 13
- Most consecutive seasons in Super League: 8 (2005–06 to 2013)

==== Titles ====
- Most Super League titles won: 1

==== Points ====
- Most Super League points: 396
- Most points in a season: 48 (2007–08)

==== Wins and losses ====
- Most Super League wins: 105
- Most wins in a single season: 14 (2007–08)
- Biggest Super League victory: 6–1 vs PDRM FC (13 March 2026)
- Biggest Super League losses: 0–7 Johor Darul Ta'zim (6 March 2023)

==== Goals ====
- Most Super League goals scored: 423
- Most goals scored in a single season: 48 (2007–08)
- Fewest goals conceded in a single season: 14 (2005–06)

== Head-to-head ==
Negeri Sembilan's head-to-head records against other clubs since Malaysia Super League and Malaysia Premier League introduced in 2004.

=== Armed Forces (ATM) ===
As of 11 August 2023

Since 2012, Negeri Sembilan has played against ATM in 9 matches. Head-to-head record shows Negeri Sembilan has won 3 matches, while ATM has won 4. Besides that, the rest of it was recorded as 2 draws.

Competition	Negeri Sembilan wins	Draws	ATM wins	Ms
League	3	2	1	6
Malaysia Cup	0	0	3	3
Total	3	2	4	9

Results against ATM;

No.	Dates	Ground	Result	Competition	W/D/L
1	28 September 2012	Away	2–3	Malaysia Cup	0/0/1
2	2 October 2012	Home	1–3	Malaysia Cup	0/0/2
3	16 February 2013	Home	1–1	Super League	0/1/2
4	18 May 2013	Away	2–1	Super League	1/1/2
5	25 August 2015	Away	0–3	Malaysia Cup	1/1/3
6	11 March 2016	Home	5–0	Premier League	2/1/3
7	15 August 2016	Away	2–3	Premier League	2/1/4
8	7 April 2017	Home	1–0	Premier League	3/1/4
9	5 May 2017	Away	1–1	Premier League	3/2/4

=== DPMM FC ===
As of 15 June 2026

Since 2007, Negeri Sembilan has played against DPMM in 6 matches. Head-to-head record shows Negeri Sembilan has won 2 matches, while DPMM also has won 2. Besides that, the rest of it was recorded as 2 draws.

Competition	Negeri Sembilan wins	Draws	DPMM wins	Ms
League	2	2	2	6
Total	2	2	2	6

Results against DPMM;

No.	Dates	Ground	Result	Competition	W/D/L
1	14 February 2007	Away	1–5	Super League	0/0/1
2	3 June 2007	Home	0–1	Super League	0/0/2
3	1 November 2007	Away	1–0	Super League	1/0/2
4	26 April 2008	Home	3–2	Super League	2/0/2
5	2 September 2025	Away	2–2	Super League	2/1/2
6	12 April 2026	Home	2–2	Super League	2/2/2

=== Felda United (Dissolved in 2020) ===
As of 11 August 2023

Since 2011, Negeri Sembilan has played against Felda United in 15 matches. Head-to-head record shows Negeri Sembilan has won 4 matches, while Felda has won 8. Besides that, the rest of it was recorded as 3 draws.

Competition	Negeri Sembilan wins	Draws	Felda wins	Ms
League	2	1	5	8
Malaysia Cup	2	2	2	6
FA Cup	0	0	1	1
Total	4	3	8	15

Results against Felda United;

No.	Dates	Ground	Result	Competition	W/D/L
1	15 February 2011	Home	0–1	Super League	0/0/1
2	30 April 2011	Away	2–2	Super League	0/1/1
3	10 October 2011	Away	0–1	Malaysia Cup	0/1/2
4	14 October 2011	Home	3–0	Malaysia Cup	1/1/2
5	21 January 2012	Home	1–0	Super League	2/1/2
6	16 June 2012	Away	0–1	Super League	2/1/3
7	22 August 2012	Away	1–1	Malaysia Cup	2/2/3
8	14 September 2012	Home	1–1	Malaysia Cup	2/3/3
9	9 February 2013	Home	0–1	Super League	2/3/4
10	6 July 2013	Away	1–2	Super League	2/3/5
11	21 January 2014	Home	0–1	FA Cup	2/3/6
12	7 February 2014	Home	2–1	Premier League	3/3/6
13	9 May 2014	Away	0–1	Premier League	3/3/7
14	13 July 2016	Away	1–3	Malaysia Cup	3/3/8
15	19 August 2016	Home	2–0	Malaysia Cup	4/3/8

=== Star City ===
As of 15 June 2026

Since 2025, Negeri Sembilan has played against Star City in 4 matches. Head-to-head record shows Negeri Sembilan has won 1 matches, while Star City also has won 1. Besides that, the rest of it was recorded as 2 draws.

Competition	Negeri Sembilan wins	Draws	Star City wins	Ms
League	0	1	1	2
Malaysia Cup	1	1	0	2
Total	1	2	1	4

Results against Immigration;

No.	Dates	Ground	Result	Competition	W/D/L
1	20 September 2025	Away	1–1	Super League	0/1/0
2	17 January 2026	Away	0–0	Malaysia Cup	0/2/0
3	25 January 2026	Home	1–0	Malaysia Cup	1/2/0
4	21 February 2026	Home	1–2	Super League	1/2/1

=== Johor Darul Ta'zim ===
As of 15 June 2026

Since 2005, Negeri Sembilan has played against Johor Darul Ta'zim (Note: Previously known as Johor FC (1972–2012)) in 35 matches. Head-to-head record shows Negeri Sembilan has won 11 matches, while JDT has won 18. Besides that, the rest of it was recorded as 6 draws.

Competition	Negeri Sembilan wins	Draws	JDT wins	Ms
League	9	5	13	27
Malaysia Cup	1	0	3	4
FA Cup	1	1	2	4
Total	11	6	18	35

Results against Johor Darul Ta'zim;

No.	Dates	Ground	Result	Competition	W/D/L
1	6 February 2005	Home	1–0	Premier League	1/0/0
2	27 March 2005	Away	1–1	Premier League	1/1/0
3	22 May 2005	Away	3–0	Premier League	2/1/0
4	16 December 2005	Away	0–0	Super League	2/2/0
5	4 August 2007	Home	1–1	Super League	2/3/0
6	1 January 2008	Home	2–0	Super League	3/3/0
7	30 March 2008	Away	4–2	Super League	4/3/0
8	10 February 2009	Home	3–0	Super League	5/3/0
9	27 June 2009	Away	0–3	Super League	5/3/1
10	12 January 2010	Away	1–1	Super League	5/4/1
11	2 February 2010	Away	2–2	FA Cup	5/5/1
12	6 February 2010	Home	5–3	FA Cup	6/5/1
13	18 May 2010	Home	2–1	Super League	7/5/1
14	20 October 2010	Home	0–1	Malaysia Cup	7/5/2
15	23 October 2010	Away	2–0	Malaysia Cup	8/5/2
16	9 April 2011	Away	0–0	Super League	8/6/2
17	19 May 2011	Home	2–1	Super League	9/6/2
18	14 January 2012	Away	2–0	Super League	10/6/2
19	18 February 2012	Home	1–2	FA Cup	10/6/3
20	12 May 2012	Home	2–1	Super League	11/6/3
21	2 March 2013	Away	1–2	Super League	11/6/4
22	2 July 2013	Home	0–2	Super League	11/6/5
23	4 March 2016	Away	1–4	FA Cup	11/6/6
24	5 May 2018	Home	0–4	Super League	11/6/7
25	23 May 2018	Away	0–2	Super League	11/6/8
26	11 May 2022	Home	0–1	Super League	11/6/9
27	1 October 2022	Away	0–5	Super League	11/6/10
28	6 March 2023	Home	0–7	Super League	11/6/11
29	8 July 2023	Away	0–2	Super League	11/6/12
30	13 September 2023	Home	0–3	Malaysia Cup	11/6/13
31	23 September 2023	Away	1–4	Malaysia Cup	11/6/14
32	18 May 2024	Away	1–3	Super League	11/6/15
33	1 November 2024	Home	0–4	Super League	11/6/16
34	12 August 2025	Away	3–5	Super League	11/6/17
35	9 January 2026	Home	0–1	Super League	11/6/18

=== Kedah Darul Aman ===
As of 8 June 2025

Since 2005, Negeri Sembilan has played against Kedah Darul Aman in 34 matches. Head-to-head record shows Negeri Sembilan has won 10 matches, while Kedah has won 16. Besides that, the rest of it was recorded as 8 draws.

Competition	Negeri Sembilan wins	Draws	Kedah wins	Ms
League	9	5	10	24
Malaysia Cup	1	2	3	6
FA Cup	0	1	3	4
Total	10	8	16	34

Results against Kedah;

No.	Dates	Ground	Result	Competition	W/D/L
1	23 February 2005	Home	0–3	FA Cup	0/0/1
2	18 May 2005	Away	0–1	FA Cup	0/0/2
3	20 December 2006	Home	0–1	Super League	0/0/3
4	1 January 2007	Away	0–7	Super League	0/0/4
5	15 January 2008	Away	1–2	Super League	0/0/5
6	1 March 2008	Home	1–1	Super League	0/1/5
7	6 January 2009	Home	3–0	Super League	1/1/5
8	16 June 2009	Away	1–3	Super League	1/1/6
9	13 March 2010	Away	1–0	Super League	2/1/6
10	10 April 2010	Home	1–1 (Note: Negeri Sembilan won penalty shoot-out: 5–4)	FA Cup	2/2/6
11	10 July 2010	Home	2–1	Super League	3/2/6
12	12 April 2011	Home	0–2	Super League	3/2/7
13	14 June 2011	Away	1–1	Super League	3/3/7
14	17 March 2012	Home	2–1	Super League	4/3/7
15	7 July 2012	Away	2–0	Super League	5/3/7
16	24 February 2014	Away	1–0	Premier League	6/3/7
17	23 May 2014	Home	1–2	Premier League	6/3/8
18	17 April 2015	Away	1–2	Premier League	6/3/9
19	14 August 2015	Home	2–0	Premier League	7/3/9
20	28 August 2016	Home	0–0	Malaysia Cup	7/4/9
21	17 September 2016	Away	0–5	Malaysia Cup	7/4/10
22	2 March 2018	Away	0–1	FA Cup	7/4/11
23	1 May 2018	Away	3–3	Super League	7/5/11
24	13 May 2018	Home	1–2	Super League	7/5/12
25	3 August 2019	Home	1–3	Malaysia Cup	7/5/13
26	17 September 2019	Away	2–4	Malaysia Cup	7/5/14
27	17 May 2022	Away	0–0	Super League	7/6/14
28	8 October 2022	Home	4–3	Super League	8/6/14
29	26 October 2022	Away	2–1	Malaysia Cup	9/6/14
30	1 November 2022	Home	0–0	Malaysia Cup	9/7/14
31	28 April 2023	Home	1–2	Super League	9/6 7/15
32	28 October 2023	Away	0–3	Super League	9/7/16
33	17 August 2024	Away	2–2	Super League	9/8/16
34	26 February 2025	Home	2–0	Super League	10/8/16

=== Kelantan (Dissolved in 2024) ===
As of 11 August 2023

Since 2004, Negeri Sembilan has played against Kelantan in 32 matches. Head-to-head record shows Negeri Sembilan has won 15 matches, while Kelantan has won 10. Besides that, the rest of it was recorded as 7 draws.

Competition	Negeri Sembilan wins	Draws	Kelantan wins	Ms
League	10	4	8	22
Malaysia Cup	4	3	1	8
FA Cup	1	0	1	2
Total	15	7	10	32

Results against Kelantan;

No.	Dates	Ground	Result	Competition	W/D/L
1	25 April 2004	Away	1–0	Premier League	1/0/0
2	23 June 2004	Home	4–0	Premier League	2/0/0
3	4 August 2004	Away	4–1	Premier League	3/0/0
4	20 June 2008	Away	0–0	Malaysia Cup	3/1/0
5	2 August 2008	Home	4–1	Malaysia Cup	4/1/0
6	31 March 2009	Away	2–1	Super League	5/1/0
7	7 April 2009	Away	1–0	FA Cup	6/1/0
8	18 April 2009	Home	1–2	FA Cup	6/1/1
9	2 May 2009	Home	2–0	Super League	7/1/1
10	7 November 2009	Bukit Jalil	3–1	Malaysia Cup	8/1/1
11	17 April 2010	Home	1–3	Super League	8/1/2
12	6 July 2010	Away	0–1	Super League	8/1/3
13	14 September 2010	Away	1–0	Malaysia Cup	9/1/3
14	3 October 2010	Home	2–2	Malaysia Cup	9/2/3
15	30 October 2010	Bukit Jalil	1–2	Malaysia Cup	9/2/4
16	1 March 2011	Away	0–3	Super League	9/2/5
17	10 May 2011	Home	0–0	Super League	9/3/5
18	4 March 2012	Away	1–2	Super League	9/3/6
19	3 July 2012	Home	2–3	Super League	9/3/7
20	22 January 2013	Away	0–0	Super League	9/4/7
21	10 May 2013	Home	0–3	Super League	9/4/8
22	27 August 2013	Home	1–1	Malaysia Cup	9/5/8
23	31 August 2013	Away	3–2	Malaysia Cup	10/5/8
24	14 April 2018	Home	1–1	Super League	10/6/8
25	26 May 2018	Away	2–0	Super League	11/6/8
26	20 April 2019	Away	5–2	Premier League	12/6/8
27	18 May 2019	Home	3–1	Premier League	13/6/8
28	3 October 2020	Away	2–2	Premier League	13/7/8
29	18 April 2021	Home	2–1	Premier League	14/7/8
30	27 August 2021	Away	1–2	Premier League	14/7/9
31	1 April 2023	Home	4–2	Super League	15/7/9
32	9 August 2023	Away	0–2	Super League	15/7/10

=== Kelantan Red Warrior ===
As of 24 August 2026

Since 2026, Negeri Sembilan has played against Kelantan RW in 0 matches. Head-to-head record shows Negeri Sembilan has won 0 matches, while Star City also has won 0. Besides that, the rest of it was recorded as 0 draws.

Competition	Negeri Sembilan wins	Draws	Kelantan RW wins	Ms
League	0	0	0	0
Total	0	0	0	0

Results against Kelantan RW;

No.	Dates	Ground	Result	Competition	W/D/L
1	4 December 2026	Away	–	Super League	0/0/0
2	24 April 2027	Home	–	Super League	0/0/0

=== Kelantan The Real Warriors (Dissolved in 2026) ===
As of 15 June 2026

Since 2020, Negeri Sembilan has played against Kelantan TRW (Note: Previously known as Kelantan Darul Naim (2024–2025) and Kelantan United (2017–2023).) in 12 matches. Head-to-head record shows Negeri Sembilan has won 7 matches, while Kelantan TRW has won 4. Besides that, the rest of it was recorded as 1 draws.

Competition	Negeri Sembilan wins	Draws	Kelantan TRW wins	Ms
League	5	1	3	9
Malaysia Cup	2	0	1	3
Total	7	1	4	12

Results against Kelantan TRW;

No.	Dates	Ground	Result	Competition	W/D/L
1	14 March 2020	Away	0–3	Premier League	0/0/1
2	9 April 2021	Home	2–3	Premier League	0/0/2
3	21 August 2021	Away	2–0	Premier League	1/0/2
4	1 October 2021	Away	0–1	Malaysia Cup	1/0/3
5	23 May 2023	Home	3–3	Super League	1/1/3
6	5 August 2023	Away	1–0	Malaysia Cup	2/1/3
7	20 August 2023	Home	4–2	Malaysia Cup	3/1/3
8	1 December 2023	Away	4–0	Super League	4/1/3
9	27 September 2024	Home	2–3	Super League	4/1/4
10	13 April 2025	Away	2–1	Super League	5/1/4
11	24 December 2025	Away	0–2	Super League	6/1/4
12	16 May 2026	Home	2–1	Super League	7/1/4

=== Kuala Lumpur City ===
As of 15 June 2026

Since 2004, Negeri Sembilan has played against Kuala Lumpur City in 29 matches. Head-to-head record shows Negeri Sembilan has won 8 matches, while KL City has won 9. Besides that, the rest of it was recorded as 12 draws.

Competition	Negeri Sembilan wins	Draws	KL City wins	Ms
League	8	9	9	26
Malaysia Cup	0	2	0	2
FA Cup	0	1	0	1
Total	8	12	9	29

Results against KL City FC;

No.	Dates	Ground	Result	Competition	W/D/L
1	5 June 2004	Away	2–0	Premier League	1/0/0
2	13 June 2004	Home	1–1	Premier League	1/1/0
3	28 July 2004	Away	2–2	Premier League	1/2/0
4	6 August 2005	Away	2–2	Malaysia Cup	1/3/0
5	20 August 2005	Home	1–1	Malaysia Cup	1/4/0
6	16 January 2010	Away	1–1	Super League	1/5/0
7	22 May 2010	Home	1–2	Super League	1/5/1
8	4 March 2011	Home	0–0 (Note: Kuala Lumpur won penalty shoot-out: 2–4)	FA Cup	1/6/1
9	5 April 2011	Home	0–1	Super League	1/6/2
10	25 May 2011	Away	1–1	Super League	1/7/2
11	30 March 2012	Away	2–1	Super League	2/7/2
12	10 July 2012	Home	1–1	Super League	2/8/2
13	1 May 2015	Away	0–1	Premier League	2/8/3
14	21 August 2015	Home	2–1	Premier League	3/8/3
15	26 February 2016	Home	1–1	Premier League	3/9/3
16	9 September 2016	Away	2–1	Premier League	4/9/3
17	3 March 2017	Home	2–1	Premier League	5/9/3
18	10 July 2017	Away	2–3	Premier League	5/9/4
19	7 February 2018	Home	2–0	Super League	6/9/4
20	22 July 2018	Away	1–2	Super League	6/9/5
21	7 March 2020	Home	1–3	Premier League	6/9/6
22	24 April 2022	Home	2–1	Super League	7/9/6
23	18 August 2022	Away	0–1	Super League	7/9/7
24	15 May 2023	Home	2–1	Super League	8/9/7
25	15 July 2023	Away	1–1	Super League	8/10/7
26	21 June 2024	Home	0–3	Super League	8/10/8
27	17 December 2024	Away	1–2	Super League	8/10/9
28	20 December 2025	Home	1–1	Super League	8/11/9
29	10 May 2026	Away	2–2	Super League	8/12/9

=== Kuching City ===
As of 15 June 2026

Since 2020, Negeri Sembilan has played against Kuching City in 9 matches. Head-to-head record shows Negeri Sembilan has won 1 matches, while Kuching has won 4. Besides that, the rest of it was recorded as 4 draws.

Competition	Negeri Sembilan wins	Draws	Kuching wins	Ms
League	1	4	4	9
Total	1	4	4	9

Results against Kuching;

No.	Dates	Ground	Result	Competition	W/D/L
1	25 September 2020	Home	2–4	Premier League	0/0/1
2	3 April 2021	Home	0–0	Premier League	0/1/1
3	1 September 2021	Away	2–1	Premier League	1/1/1
4	4 June 2023	Away	1–1	Super League	1/2/1
5	17 December 2023	Home	1–4	Super League	1/2/2
6	20 October 2024	Away	1–1	Super League	1/3/2
7	20 April 2025	Home	1–3	Super League	1/3/3
8	29 August 2025	Home	2–2	Super League	1/4/3
9	31 January 2026	Away	0–2	Super League	1/4/4

=== Melaka FC ===
As of 15 June 2026

Since 2025, Negeri Sembilan has played against Melaka FC in 2 matches. Head-to-head record shows Negeri Sembilan has won 0 matches, while Melaka FC has won 1. Besides that, the rest of it was recorded as 1 draws.

Competition	Negeri Sembilan wins	Draws	Melaka FC wins	Ms
League	0	1	1	2
Total	0	1	1	2

Results against Melaka FC;

No.	Dates	Ground	Result	Competition	W/D/L
1	6 December 2025	Away	0–2	Super League	0/0/1
2	3 May 2026	Home	1–1	Super League	0/1/1

=== Melaka United (Dissolved in 2022) ===
As of 11 August 2023

Since 2004, Negeri Sembilan has played against Melaka United in 20 matches. Head-to-head record shows Negeri Sembilan has won 10 matches, while Melaka has won 5. Besides that, the rest of it was recorded as 5 draws.

Competition	Negeri Sembilan wins	Draws	Melaka wins	Ms
League	5	3	3	11
Malaysia Cup	3	0	2	5
FA Cup	2	2	0	4
Total	10	5	5	20

Results against Melaka;

No.	Dates	Ground	Result	Competition	W/D/L
1	7 March 2004	Away	1–1	Premier League	0/1/0
2	8 May 2004	Away	2–2	FA Cup	0/2/0
3	15 May 2004	Home	3–1	FA Cup	1/2/0
4	26 May 2004	Home	4–2	Premier League	2/2/0
5	10 July 2004	Away	2–1	Premier League	3/2/0
6	10 January 2007	Away	3–1	Super League	4/2/0
7	19 June 2007	Home	3–1	Super League	5/2/0
8	11 June 2008	Away	1–0	Malaysia Cup	6/2/0
9	6 July 2008	Home	3–2	Malaysia Cup	7/2/0
10	31 January 2009	Home	0–0	FA Cup	7/3/0
11	3 February 2009	Away	2–1	FA Cup	8/3/0
12	1 March 2016	Away	0–0	Premier League	8/4/0
13	19 July 2016	Home	3–2	Malaysia Cup	9/4/0
14	12 August 2016	Away	0–2	Malaysia Cup	9/4/1
15	23 August 2016	Home	0–1	Premier League	9/4/2
16	11 February 2018	Away	0–3	Super League	9/4/3
17	28 July 2018	Home	1–3	Super League	9/4/4
18	27 September 2021	Away	0–2	Malaysia Cup	9/4/5
19	18 June 2022	Away	0–0	Super League	9/5/5
20	11 October 2022	Home	2–0	Super League	10/5/5

=== Sri Pahang (Dissolved in 2025) ===
As of 8 June 2025

Since 2005, Negeri Sembilan has played against Sri Pahang in 31 matches. Head-to-head record shows Negeri Sembilan has won 8 matches, while Pahang has won 16. Besides that, the rest of it was recorded as 7 draws.

Competition	Negeri Sembilan wins	Draws	Pahang wins	Ms
League	7	5	11	23
Malaysia Cup	1	1	2	4
FA Cup	0	1	3	4
Total	8	7	16	31

Results against Sri Pahang;

No.	Dates	Ground	Result	Competition	W/D/L
1	3 December 2005	Home	1–0	Super League	1/0/0
2	21 January 2006	Away	0–1	Super League	1/0/1
3	1 April 2006	Home	1–1	Super League	1/1/1
4	29 April 2006	Home	0–0	FA Cup	1/2/1
5	13 May 2006	Away	2–3	FA Cup	1/2/2
6	6 January 2007	Home	0–1	Super League	1/2/3
7	2 May 2007	Away	2–2	Super League	1/3/3
8	26 January 2008	Away	2–2	Super League	1/4/3
9	23 February 2008	Home	2–3	Super League	1/4/4
10	16 May 2009	Home	3–0	Super League	2/4/4
11	19 May 2009	Away	0–1	Super League	2/4/5
12	9 February 2010	Away	1–2	Super League	2/4/6
13	31 July 2010	Home	5–0	Super League	3/4/6
14	19 April 2011	Away	1–1	Super League	3/5/6
15	23 April 2011	Home	3–1	Super League	4/5/6
16	15 January 2013	Away	1–2	Super League	4/5/7
17	22 May 2013	Home	0–2	Super League	4/5/8
18	24 August 2013	Home	3–5	Malaysia Cup	4/5/9
19	17 September 2013	Away	0–3	Malaysia Cup	4/5/10
20	30 April 2017	Away	0–1	FA Cup	4/5/11
21	13 May 2017	Home	1–2	FA Cup	4/5/12
22	4 July 2017	Away	2–2	Malaysia Cup	4/6/12
23	29 July 2017	Home	2–1	Malaysia Cup	5/6/12
24	10 March 2018	Away	0–4	Super League	5/6/13
25	19 June 2018	Home	1–3	Super League	5/6/14
26	25 June 2022	Home	3–0	Super League	6/6/14
27	15 October 2022	Away	0–2	Super League	6/6/15
28	26 February 2023	Home	1–1	Super League	6/7/15
29	9 June 2023	Away	3–4	Super League	6/7/16
30	13 July 2024	Away	0–2	Super League	7/7/16
31	10 January 2025	Home	2–1	Super League	8/7/16

=== Polis Diraja Malaysia (PDRM) (Dissolved in 2026) ===
As of 15 June 2026

Since 2005, Negeri Sembilan has played against Polis Diraja Malaysia in 28 matches. Head-to-head record shows Negeri Sembilan has won 16 matches, while PDRM has won 6. Besides that, the rest of it was recorded as 6 draws.

Competition	Negeri Sembilan wins	Draws	PDRM wins	Ms
League	12	5	4	21
Malaysia Cup	1	0	1	2
FA Cup	3	1	1	5
Total	16	6	6	28

Results against PDRM;

No.	Dates	Ground	Result	Competition	W/L/D
1	6 March 2005	Home	3–0	Premier League	1/0/0
2	11 May 2005	Away	2–1	Premier League	2/0/0
3	3 July 2005	Away	3–0	Premier League	3/0/0
4	6 February 2007	Home	0–0 (Note: Negeri Sembilan won penalty shoot-out: 6–5)	FA Cup	3/1/0
5	29 January 2008	Home	3–2	Super League	4/1/0
6	16 February 2008	away	1–1	Super League	4/2/0
7	28 February 2009	Home	4–1	Super League	5/2/0
8	11 April 2009	Away	1–1	Super League	5/3/0
9	16 February 2010	Away	3–2	FA Cup	6/3/0
10	20 February 2010	Home	5–0	FA Cup	7/3/0
11	24 March 2014	Away	2–2	Premier League	7/4/0
12	20 June 2014	Home	0–4	Premier League	7/4/1
13	10 February 2017	Away	2–1	Premier League	8/4/1
14	4 August 2017	Home	2–2	Premier League	8/5/1
15	9 February 2019	Away	1–1	Premier League	8/6/1
16	13 July 2019	Home	2–3	Premier League	8/6/2
17	2 May 2021	Away	1–0	Premier League	9/6/2
18	21 September 2021	Home	4–2	Premier League	10/6/2
19	18 May 2023	Away	2–1	Super League	11/6/2
20	25 November 2023	Home	2–0	Super League	12/6/2
21	11 August 2024	Home	1–2	Super League	12/6/3
22	24 September 2024	Home	1–2	Malaysia Cup	12/6/4
23	29 September 2024	Away	3–0	Malaysia Cup	13/6/4
24	15 March 2025	Away	1–2	Super League	13/6/5
25	18 August 2025	Home	5–0	FA Cup	14/6/5
26	12 September 2025	Away	0–1	FA Cup	14/6/6
27	25 October 2025	Home	2–0	Super League	15/6/6
28	13 March 2026	Away	1–6	Super League	16/6/6

=== Penang ===
As of 15 June 2026

Since 2004, Negeri Sembilan has played against Penang in 34 matches. Head-to-head record shows Negeri Sembilan has won 13 matches, while Penang has won 12. Besides that, the rest of it was recorded as 9 draws.

Competition	Negeri Sembilan wins	Draws	Penang wins	Ms
League	10	7	9	26
Malaysia Cup	1	1	2	4
FA Cup	2	1	1	4
Total	13	9	12	34

Results against Penang;

No.	Dates	Ground	Result	Competition	W/D/L
1	15 September 2004	Away	1–5	Malaysia Cup	0/0/1
2	29 September 2004	Home	2–0	Malaysia Cup	1/0/1
3	14 August 2005	Home	0–0	Malaysia Cup	1/1/1
4	24 August 2005	Away	1–2	Malaysia Cup	1/1/2
5	17 December 2005	Home	2–0	Super League	2/1/2
6	12 February 2006	Away	0–1	Super League	2/1/3
7	15 April 2006	Home	2–0	Super League	3/1/3
8	23 December 2006	Away	0–1	Super League	3/1/4
9	4 April 2007	Home	2–1	Super League	4/1/4
10	12 January 2008	Home	2–1	Super League	5/1/4
11	11 March 2008	Away	3–2	Super League	6/1/4
12	3 January 2009	Away	3–0	Super League	7/1/4
13	21 February 2009	Away	1–1	FA Cup	7/2/4
14	24 February 2009	Home	3–1	FA Cup	8/2/4
15	23 May 2009	Home	5–1	Super League	9/2/4
16	23 April 2010	Home	4–1	Super League	10/2/4
17	28 July 2010	Away	3–0	Super League	11/2/4
18	21 March 2014	Home	1–3	Premier League	11/2/5
19	16 June 2014	Away	1–2	Premier League	11/2/6
20	17 March 2015	Home	1–2	FA Cup	11/2/7
21	8 May 2015	Home	2–2	Premier League	11/3/7
22	11 August 2015	Away	0–1	Premier League	11/3/8
23	11 March 2017	Home	4–1	FA Cup	12/3/8
24	24 February 2019	Home	1–1	Premier League	12/4/8
25	26 June 2019	Away	1–2	Premier League	12/4/9
26	4 September 2020	Away	0–2	Premier League	12/4/10
27	9 April 2022	Away	1–1	Super League	12/5/10
28	9 August 2022	Home	3–2	Super League	13/5/10
29	1 March 2023	Away	0–0	Super League	13/6/10
30	26 June 2023	Home	1–1	Super League	13/7/10
31	22 September 2024	Away	2–2	Super League	13/8/10
32	5 April 2025	Home	0–2	Super League	13/8/11
33	4 September 2025	Away	1–2	Super League	13/8/12
34	7 March 2026	Home	3–3	Super League	13/9/12

=== Perak (Dissolved in 2025) ===
As of 8 June 2025

Since 2004, Negeri Sembilan has played against Perak in 30 matches. Head-to-head record shows Negeri Sembilan has won 11 matches, while Perak has won 13. Besides that, the rest of it was recorded as 6 draws.

Competition	Negeri Sembilan wins	Draws	Perak wins	Ms
League	8	5	10	23
Malaysia Cup	2	1	1	4
FA Cup	1	0	2	3
Total	11	6	13	30

Results against Perak;

No.	Dates	Ground	Result	Competition	W/L/D
1	16 June 2004	Home	3–2	FA Cup	1/0/0
2	30 June 2004	Away	0–6	FA Cup	1/0/1
3	25 August 2004	Away	0–2	Malaysia Cup	1/0/2
4	18 September 2004	Home	1–0	Malaysia Cup	2/0/2
5	14 January 2006	Away	1–2	Super League	2/0/3
6	25 March 2006	Home	5–1	Super League	3/0/3
7	23 May 2006	Away	2–0	Super League	4/0/3
8	13 March 2007	Home	2–2	Super League	4/1/3
9	24 March 2007	Away	1–5	Super League	4/1/4
10	23 December 2007	Away	1–0	Super League	5/1/4
11	12 April 2008	Home	3–1	Super League	6/1/4
12	13 January 2009	Home	3–0	Super League	7/1/4
13	23 June 2009	Away	0–2	Super League	7/1/5
14	20 April 2010	Away	1–2	Super League	7/1/6
15	17 July 2010	Home	0–0	Super League	7/2/6
16	12 February 2011	Away	2–0	Super League	8/2/6
17	3 May 2011	Home	3–1	Super League	9/2/6
18	14 January 2012	Away	1–2	Super League	9/2/7
19	15 May 2012	Home	3–1	Super League	10/2/7
20	28 August 2012	Home	0–0	Malaysia Cup	10/3/7
21	1 September 2012	Away	1–0	Malaysia Cup	11/3/7
22	19 January 2013	Home	0–1	Super League	11/3/8
23	7 May 2013	Away	1–2	Super League	11/3/9
24	6 June 2018	Home	1–1	Super League	11/4/9
25	9 June 2018	Away	0–2	Super League	11/4/10
26	3 April 2019	Away	1–2	FA Cup	11/4/11
27	19 April 2023	Away	1–1	Super League	11/5/11
28	1 October 2023	Home	0–1	Super League	11/5/12
29	14 September 2024	Home	0–1	Super League	11/5/13
30	8 March 2024	Away	0–0	Super League	11/6/13

=== Perlis (Dissolved in 2019) ===
As of 11 August 2023

Since 2004, Negeri Sembilan has played against Perlis in 24 matches. Head-to-head record shows Negeri Sembilan has won 13 matches, while Perlis has won 7. Besides that, the rest of it was recorded as 4 draws.

Competition	Negeri Sembilan wins	Draws	Perlis wins	Ms
League	9	4	6	19
Malaysia Cup	4	0	1	5
Total	13	4	7	24

Results against Perlis;

No.	Dates	Ground	Result	Competition	W/D/L
1	2 October 2004	Home	3–2	Malaysia Cup	1/0/0
2	6 October 2004	Away	0–1 (Note: Match ended with aggregate 3–3, Perlis won the penalty shoot-out: 4–5)	Malaysia Cup	1/0/1
3	7 January 2006	Home	2–1	Super League	2/0/1
4	18 March 2006	Away	0–0	Super League	2/1/1
5	19 May 2006	Home	1–0	Super League	3/1/1
6	16 September 2006	Bukit Jalil	2–1	Malaysia Cup	4/1/1
7	3 January 2007	Away	0–3	Super League	4/1/2
8	18 April 2007	Home	2–2	Super League	4/2/2
9	19 January 2008	Home	2–0	Super League	5/2/2
10	26 February 2008	Away	2–2	Super League	5/3/2
11	14 February 2008	Away	0–1	Super League	5/3/3
12	30 June 2009	Home	0–4	Super League	5/3/4
13	6 March 2010	Home	3–2	Super League	6/3/4
14	3 August 2010	Away	0–2	Super League	6/3/5
15	12 October 2010	Home	1–0	Malaysia Cup	7/3/5
16	16 October 2010	Away	3–1	Malaysia Cup	8/3/5
17	16 April 2011	Away	2–3	Super League	8/3/6
18	6 July 2011	Home	2–0	Super League	9/3/6
19	4 April 2014	Away	1–0	Premier League	10/3/6
20	11 April 2014	Home	2–0	Premier League	11/3/6
21	22 April 2016	Home	3–1	Premier League	12/3/6
22	15 July 2016	Away	1–2	Premier League	12/3/7
23	25 April 2017	Away	1–1	Premier League	12/4/7
24	30 June 2017	Home	1–0	Premier League	13/4/7

=== Sabah ===
As of 15 June 2026

Since 2006, Negeri Sembilan has played against Sabah in 27 matches. Head-to-head record shows Negeri Sembilan has won 8 matches, while Sabah has won 11. Besides that, the rest of it was recorded as 8 draws.

Competition	Negeri Sembilan wins	Draws	Sabah wins	Ms
League	4	7	10	21
Malaysia Cup	3	0	1	4
FA Cup	1	1	0	2
Total	8	8	11	27

Results against Sabah;

No.	Dates	Ground	Result	Competition	W/D/L
1	8 July 2006	Away	3–0	Malaysia Cup	1/0/0
2	22 July 2006	Home	3–0	Malaysia Cup	2/0/0
3	8 August 2007	Home	1–0	Malaysia Cup	3/0/0
4	15 August 2007	Away	1–3	Malaysia Cup	3/0/1
5	26 February 2011	Home	1–0	Super League	4/0/1
6	6 May 2011	Away	0–2	Super League	4/0/2
7	7 April 2012	Home	2–2	Super League	4/1/2
8	14 July 2012	Away	1–3	Super League	4/1/3
9	10 February 2014	Away	1–2	Premier League	4/1/4
10	16 May 2014	Home	0–1	Premier League	4/1/5
11	19 June 2015	Home	1–3	Premier League	4/1/6
12	22 June 2015	Away	2–2	Premier League	4/2/6
13	3 March 2016	Home	2–2	Premier League	4/3/6
14	2 August 2016	Away	0–0	Premier League	4/4/6
15	20 January 2017	Home	3–0	Premier League	5/4/6
16	1 April 2017	Away	1–0	FA Cup	6/4/6
17	21 April 2017	Home	0–0	FA Cup	6/5/6
18	9 March 2019	Home	0–0	Premier League	6/6/6
19	15 July 2019	Away	0–1	Premier League	6/6/7
20	4 March 2022	Away	1–0	Super League	7/6/7
21	3 July 2022	Home	0–1	Super League	7/6/8
22	10 April 2023	Home	1–1	Super League	7/7/8
23	26 August 2023	Away	1–3	Super League	7/7/9
24	25 July 2024	Away	0–2	Super League	7/7/10
25	25 January 2025	Home	1–2	Super League	7/7/11
26	27 September 2025	Home	3–0	Super League	8/7/11
27	28 February 2026	Away	1–1	Super League	8/8/11

=== Sarawak (Dissolved in 2021) ===
As of 11 August 2023

Since 2005, Negeri Sembilan has played against Sarawak in 19 matches. Head-to-head record shows Negeri Sembilan has won 15 matches, while Sarawak has won 1. Besides that, the rest of it was recorded as 3 draws.

Competition	Negeri Sembilan wins	Draws	Sarawak wins	Ms
League	9	1	1	11
Malaysia Cup	4	2	0	6
Challenge Cup	2	0	0	2
Total	15	3	1	19

Results against Sarawak;

No.	Dates	Ground	Result	Competition	W/D/L
1	20 February 2005	Home	3–1	Premier League	1/0/0
2	27 April 2005	Away	3–2	Premier League	2/0/0
3	19 June 2005	Away	2–0	Premier League	3/0/0
4	5 August 2006	Home	1–1	Malaysia Cup	3/1/0
5	13 August 2006	Away	1–1 (Note: Negeri Sembilan won penalty shoot-out: 5–4)	Malaysia Cup	3/2/0
6	28 August 2007	Home	3–1	Super League	4/2/0
7	13 June 2007	Away	0–3	Super League	4/2/1
8	5 January 2008	Away	3–2	Super League	5/2/1
9	15 March 2008	Home	4–0	Super League	6/2/1
10	30 June 2008	Away	2–1	Malaysia Cup	7/2/1
11	15 July 2008	Home	3–0	Malaysia Cup	8/2/1
12	29 September 2009	Home	8–0	Malaysia Cup	9/2/1
13	10 October 2009	Away	1–0	Malaysia Cup	10/2/1
14	28 January 2012	Away	2–2	Super League	10/3/1
15	19 June 2012	Home	3–1	Super League	11/3/1
16	28 August 2018	Home	3–1	Challenge Cup	12/3/1
17	4 September 2018	Away	2–0	Challenge Cup	13/3/1
18	2 February 2019	Home	2–1	Premier League	14/3/1
19	6 July 2019	Away	4–2	Premier League	15/3/1

=== Sarawak United (Dissolved in 2024) ===
As of 11 August 2023

Since 2019, Negeri Sembilan has played against Sarawak United in 7 matches. Head-to-head record shows Negeri Sembilan has won 4 matches, while Sarawak Utd has won 1. Besides that, the rest of it was recorded as 2 draws.

Competition	Negeri Sembilan wins	Draws	Sarawak Utd wins	Ms
League	4	2	1	7
Total	4	2	1	7

Results against Sarawak United;

Dates	Ground	Result	Competition
2 March 2019	Away	0–0	Premier League
18 June 2019	Home	3–0	Premier League
9 October 2020	Home	1–2	Premier League
24 April 2021	Home	1–1	Premier League
10 September 2021	Away	1–0	Premier League
6 May 2022	Away	2–1	Super League
9 September 2022	Home	3–2	Super League

=== Selangor ===
As of 15 June 2026

Since 2005, Negeri Sembilan has played against Selangor in 43 matches. Head-to-head record shows Negeri Sembilan has won 11 matches, while Selangor has won 24. Besides that, the rest of it was recorded as 8 draws.

Competition	Negeri Sembilan wins	Draws	Selangor wins	Ms
League	8	5	15	28
Malaysia Cup	1	2	5	8
FA Cup	2	1	2	5
Total	11	8	24	43

Results against Selangor;

No.	Dates	Ground	Result	Competition	W/D/L
1	23 July 2005	Home	2–4	Premier League	0/0/1
2	31 December 2005	Away	2–0	Super League	1/0/1
3	11 March 2006	Home	2–1	Super League	2/0/1
4	6 May 2006	Away	1–1	Super League	2/1/1
5	1 July 2006	Home	1–0	Malaysia Cup	3/1/1
6	19 July 2006	Away	2–2	Malaysia Cup	3/2/1
7	27 December 2006	Home	3–1	Super League	4/2/1
8	7 April 2007	Away	1–2	Super League	4/2/2
9	18 November 2007	Home	0–2	Super League	4/2/3
10	3 May 2008	Away	3–0	Super League	5/2/3
11	27 June 2008	Away	0–3 (Note: Selangor awarded 3–0 won, original result: Negeri Sembilan 3–0 Selangor.)	Malaysia Cup	5/2/4
12	12 July 2008	Home	1–2	Malaysia Cup	5/2/5
13	10 January 2009	Away	0–3	Super League	5/2/6
14	20 June 2009	Home	1–1	Super League	5/3/6
15	9 January 2010	Home	1–2	Super League	5/3/7
16	30 March 2010	Away	2–1	FA Cup	6/3/7
17	3 April 2010	Home	0–1	FA Cup	6/3/8
18	15 May 2010	Away	2–4	Super League	6/3/9
19	12 March 2011	Home	1–2	Super League	6/3/10
20	28 May 2011	Away	0–2	Super League	6/3/11
21	10 January 2012	Home	2–2	Super League	6/4/11
22	8 May 2012	Away	3–1	Super League	7/4/11
23	8 January 2013	Away	0–1	Super League	7/4/12
24	19 April 2013	Home	0–0	Super League	7/5/12
25	14 February 2017	Away	0–0 (Note: Selangor won penalty shoot-out: 3–4)	FA Cup	7/6/12
26	28 April 2018	Away	1–2	Super League	7/6/13
27	18 July 2018	Home	3–1	Super League	8/6/13
28	5 April 2022	Home	2–2	Super League	8/7/13
29	31 July 2022	Away	3–2	Super League	9/7/13
30	6 November 2022	Away	0–2	Malaysia Cup	9/7/14
31	12 November 2022	Home	2–2	Malaysia Cup	9/8/14
32	4 April 2023	Away	1–2	Super League	9/8/15
33	27 May 2023	Home	1–3	FA Cup	9/8/16
34	14 August 2023	Home	0–4	Super League	9/8/17
35	26 May 2024	Away	0–4	Super League	9/8/18
36	15 June 2024	Away	0–4	FA Cup	9/8/19
37	19 December 2024	Home	0–4	Super League	9/8/20
38	24 August 2025	Home	2–1	Super League	10/8/20
39	18 September 2025	Home	0–4	FA Cup	10/8/21
40	29 October 2025	Away	2–3	FA Cup	11/8/21
41	14 January 2026	Away	0–1	Super League	11/8/22
42	8 February 2026	Home	0-1	Malaysia Cup	11/8/23
43	14 February 2026	Away	1–5	Malaysia Cup	11/8/24

=== Terengganu ===
As of 15 June 2026

Since 2004, Negeri Sembilan has played against Terengganu in 58 matches. Head-to-head record shows Negeri Sembilan has won 17 matches, while Terengganu has won 25. Besides that, the rest of it was recorded as 16 draws.

Competition	Negeri Sembilan wins	Draws	Terengganu wins	Ms
League	6	12	14	32
Malaysia Cup	10	3	6	19
FA Cup	1	1	5	7
Total	17	16	25	58

Results against Terengganu;

No.	Dates	Ground	Result	Competition	W/D/L
1	31 March 2004	Home	0–0	Premier League	0/1/0
2	27 June 2004	Away	4–5	Premier League	0/1/1
3	8 August 2004	Home	1–3	Premier League	0/1/2
4	27 February 2005	Away	0–1	Premier League	0/1/3
5	4 May 2005	Home	1–2	Premier League	0/1/4
6	26 March 2005	Home	2–1	Premier League	1/1/4
7	5 April 2005	Away	0–0	FA Cup	1/2/4
8	19 April 2005	Away	2–1	FA Cup	2/2/4
9	15 July 2006	Home	1–3	Malaysia Cup	2/2/5
10	29 July 2006	Away	3–3	Malaysia Cup	2/3/5
11	10 March 2007	Away	0–2	Super League	2/3/6
12	31 March 2007	Home	4–0	Super League	3/3/6
13	2 February 2008	Away	1–3	Super League	3/3/7
14	13 February 2008	Home	1–1	Super League	3/4/7
15	21 March 2008	Away	0–1	FA Cup	3/4/8
16	27 March 2008	Home	1–4	FA Cup	3/4/9
17	24 June 2008	Home	0–2	Malaysia Cup	3/4/10
18	6 July 2008	Away	0–2	Malaysia Cup	3/4/11
19	6 May 2009	Away	0–2	Super League	3/4/12
20	1 August 2009	Home	1–1	Super League	3/5/12
21	3 October 2009	Away	1–0	Malaysia Cup	4/5/12
22	13 October 2009	Home	2–0	Malaysia Cup	5/5/12
23	27 October 2009	Home	1–0	Malaysia Cup	6/5/12
24	31 October 2009	Away	3–1	Malaysia Cup	7/5/12
25	29 January 2010	Home	2–1	Super League	8/5/12
26	1 June 2010	Away	1–1	Super League	8/6/12
27	2 April 2011	Home	1–1	Super League	8/7/12
28	22 May 2011	Away	0–3	Super League	8/7/13
29	13 September 2011	Home	1–0	Malaysia Cup	9/7/13
30	27 September 2011	Away	0–0	Malaysia Cup	9/8/13
31	29 October 2011	Shah Alam	2–1	Malaysia Cup	10/8/13
32	14 April 2012	Away	0–1	Super League	10/8/14
33	17 April 2012	Home	1–1	Super League	10/9/14
34	11 January 2013	Home	0–0	Super League	10/10/14
35	6 April 2013	Home	1–3	FA Cup	10/10/15
36	16 April 2013	Away	0–3	FA Cup	10/10/16
37	26 April 2013	Away	0–1	Super League	10/10/17
38	20 August 2013	Away	2–0	Malaysia Cup	11/10/17
39	21 September 2013	Home	2–2	Malaysia Cup	11/11/17
40	30 July 2016	Away	2–1	Malaysia Cup	12/11/17
41	9 August 2016	Home	1–0	Malaysia Cup	13/11/17
42	13 February 2017	Home	3–2	Premier League	14/11/17
43	25 July 2017	Away	2–2	Premier League	14/12/17
44	23 February 2018	Home	1–2	Super League	14/12/18
45	27 June 2018	Away	2–3	Super League	14/12/19
46	17 August 2019	Away	1–3	Malaysia Cup	14/12/20
47	23 August 2019	Home	3–2	Malaysia Cup	15/12/20
48	29 April 2022	Away	1–2	FA Cup	15/12/21
49	29 June 2022	Away	0–0	Super League	15/13/21
50	27 July 2022	Home	2–1	Super League	16/13/21
51	16 March 2023	Home	2–1	Super League	17/13/21
52	28 July 2023	Away	1–1	Super League	17/14/21
53	30 July 2024	Away	2–3	Super League	17/14/22
54	14 December 2024	Home	0–2	Malaysia Cup	17/14/23
55	21 December 2024	Away	2–4	Malaysia Cup	17/14/24
56	9 February 2025	Home	0–2	Super League	17/14/25
57	22 September 2025	Home	1–1	Super League	17/15/25
58	25 April 2026	Away	2–2	Super League	17/16/25
