= Johor Darul Ta'zim F.C.–Melaka United FC rivalry =

Football rivalry in Malaysia

JDT–Melaka United rivalry
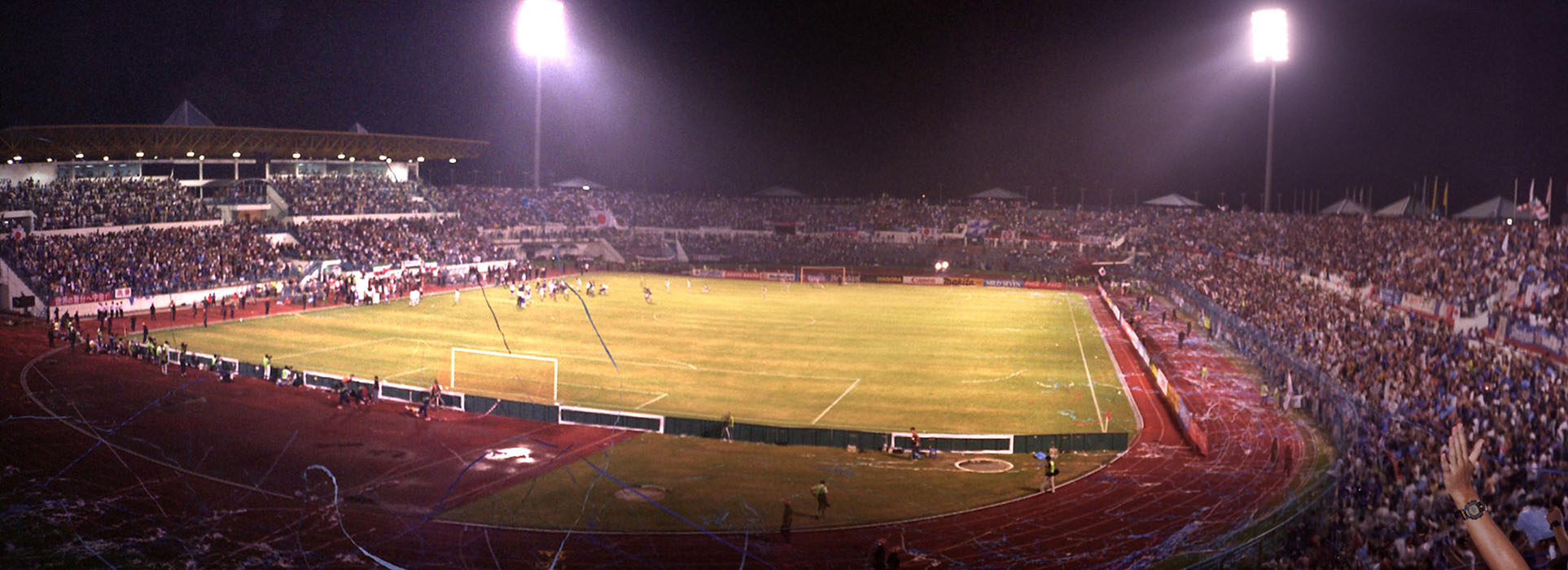
- Stadium Larkin, one of the derby's venue
- Location: Southern peninsula Malaysia
- Teams: Johor Darul Ta'zim FC; Melaka United FC
- First meeting: 1 May 1998; Liga Perdana 2 Melaka FA 3-1 Johor FC
- Latest meeting: 29 August 2022; Malaysia Super League; Johor DT 4-0 Melaka Utd
- Stadiums: Sultan Ibrahim Stadium (Johor Darul Ta'zim); Hang Jebat Stadium (Melaka United)

Statistics
- Total meetings: 31
- Most wins: Johor Darul Ta'zim (23)
- Most player appearances: Afiq Fazail and Corbin-Ong (10 matches)
- Top scorer: Bergson (7 goals)
- All-time series: JDT: 23; Drawn: 7 Melaka United: 1
- Largest victory: Johor Darul Ta'zim 7–0 Melaka United (9 April 2017)
- Longest win streak: 30 games Johor Darul Ta'zim (1998–2022)
- Longest unbeaten streak: 30 games Johor Darul Ta'zim (1998–2022)
- Current unbeaten streak: 30 games Johor Darul Ta'zim (1998–present)

The JDT-Melaka United rivalry is a football rivalry between Johor Darul Ta'zim F.C. and Melaka United FC. The derby is an inter-state rivalry in the south region of Peninsular Malaysia, as the states of Johor and Malacca share a border. Johor Darul Ta'zim play their home matches at the Sultan Ibrahim Stadium, while Melaka United play their home matches at the Hang Jebat Stadium. The rivalry dates back to 1998, with the first competitive fixture being a Liga Perdana 2 match, which Johor FC lost 1-3 against Melaka FA. Over the years, the fixture has developed into a one-sided rivalry, heavily dominated by Johor Darul Ta'zim in terms of match results and silverware.

== History ==
=== Historical backgrounds and origins ===
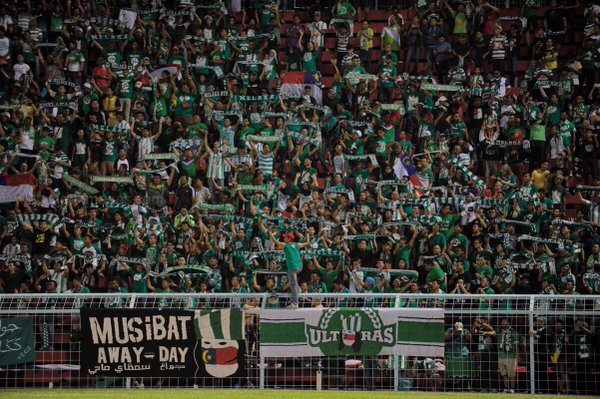
Melaka United fans traveling away to Pasir Gudang, Johor.

The roots of both clubs date back deep into the 20th century history of Malaysian football. Melaka United was originally established in 1924 as the Malacca Football Association (Malacca FA), making it one of the older state football associations in the country. Meanwhile, Johor Darul Ta'zim FC traces its official lineage back to 1972, when it was founded as the Perbadanan Kemajuan Ekonomi Negeri Johor Football Club (PKENJ FC) before evolving into Johor FC, and later undergoing a massive transformation into JDT in late 2012 under the vision of the Crown Prince of Johor.

Despite their long individual histories, the two sides rarely crossed paths as direct, high-stakes rivals during the Piala Malaysia group stages, and domestic league matches throughout the 1990s and 2000s, where both teams experienced fluctuating fortunes in different divisions.

=== Geographical proximity and regional identity ===
The core foundation of the rivalry is deeply rooted in geography. Johor and Melaka share a direct border in the southern region of Peninsular Malaysia. This close physical proximity naturally bred a localized sporting animosity, as both fanbases competed for regional bragging rights in the south.

Whenever the two teams faced each other, traveling distances for away supporters were minimal, leading to highly volatile atmospheres in both the Tan Sri Dato' Haji Hassan Yunos Stadium (Larkin) and the Hang Jebat Stadium (Krubong). The fixtures frequently took on the mantle of a "Southern Derby," where state pride and regional supremacy heavily motivated the local fanbases, elevating ordinary league matches into emotionally charged encounters.

=== The modern era resurgence (2016–2017) ===
The rivalry reached its absolute peak in intensity following Melaka United's rapid resurgence in the mid-2010s. After winning the 2016 Malaysia Premier League title, Melaka United earned promotion to the 2017 Malaysia Super League, directly setting up highly anticipated top-flight clashes against a heavily dominant JDT side.

The competitive friction during this era was further escalated by high-profile roster movements. Melaka United actively recruited several star players and former pillars of the JDT squad—including veteran figures like Safee Sali and Amri Yahyah—aiming to build a squad capable of disrupting the Southern Tigers' absolute hegemony in Malaysian football. Their inaugural modern-era encounter during the 2017 Liga Super season at Larkin ended in a dramatic 1–1 draw, which fiercely validated the growing tension between the two camps.

=== Characterization as a "One-Sided Rivalry" ===
Despite the immense off-pitch banter, media hype, and historical tension generated by the supporters, football analysts and sports journalists frequently characterize the fixture as a "one-sided rivalry."

While Melaka United and their fans approached the matches with the intense motivation typical of a fierce derby, the on-pitch reality was heavily dominated by JDT. Following their initial draw in 2017, JDT consistently secured overwhelming victories over Melaka United in subsequent league campaigns and knockout tournaments. JDT's vast financial backing, world-class infrastructure, and superior squad depth meant that while the fixtures remained highly aggressive and fiercely contested on a physical level, they rarely translated into balanced competitive outcomes, with JDT maintaining a lopsidedly superior head-to-head win record.

== List of matches ==
#	Date	Tournament	Home team	Score	Away team
1	1 May 1998	Liga Perdana 2	Melaka FA	3–1	Johor FC
2	10 July 1998	Liga Perdana 2	Johor FC	2–0	Melaka FA
3	5 April 1999	Liga Perdana 2	Johor FC	2–0	Melaka FA
4	4 June 1999	Liga Perdana 2	Melaka FA	0–2	Johor FC
5	21 April 2000	Liga Perdana 2	Johor FC	3–0	Melaka FA
6	24 June 2000	Liga Perdana 2	Melaka FA	1–1	Johor FC
7	5 February 2002	Malaysia FA Cup round 1 (1st leg)	Johor FC	3–0	Melaka FA
8	4 March 2002	Malaysia FA Cup round 1 (2nd leg)	Melaka FA	2–3	Johor FC
9	26 March 2002	Liga Perdana 1	Melaka FA	0–3	Johor FC
10	2 July 2002	Liga Perdana 1	Johor FC	2–0	Melaka FA
11	25 March 2003	Liga Perdana 1	Johor FC	1–1	Melaka FA
12	20 May 2003	Liga Perdana 1	Melaka FA	1–4	Johor FC
13	23 August 2003	Malaysia Cup group D	Melaka FA	1–3	Johor FC
14	6 September 2003	Malaysia Cup group D	Johor FC	5–1	Melaka FA
15	4 December 2005	Malaysia Premier League group B	Johor FC	3–3	Melaka FA
16	22 January 2006	Malaysia Premier League group B	Melaka FA	0–1	Johor FC
17	28 February 2007	Malaysia Super League	Melaka FA	2–2	Johor FC
18	13 June 2007	Malaysia Super League	Johor FC	4–0	Melaka FA
19	9 April 2017	Malaysia Super League	Johor Darul Ta'zim	7–0	Melaka United
20	6 May 2017	Malaysia Super League	Melaka United	1–1	Johor Darul Ta'zim
21	15 September 2017	Malaysia Cup quarter-finals (1st leg)	Melaka United	1–4	Johor Darul Ta'zim
22	24 September 2017	Malaysia Cup quarter-finals (2nd leg)	Johor Darul Ta'zim	1–1	Melaka United
23	24 February 2018	Malaysia Super League	Johor Darul Ta'zim	3–0	Melaka United
24	26 June 2018	Malaysia Super League	Melaka United	0–4	Johor Darul Ta'zim
25	22 February 2019	Malaysia Super League	Johor Darul Ta'zim	2–1	Melaka United
26	25 June 2019	Malaysia Super League	Melaka United	1–2	Johor Darul Ta'zim
27	10 October 2020	Malaysia Super League	Melaka United	0–5	Johor Darul Ta'zim
28	2 April 2021	Malaysia Super League	Johor Darul Ta'zim	3–0	Melaka United
29	3 August 2021	Malaysia Super League	Melaka United	0–1	Johor Darul Ta'zim
30	2 July 2022	Malaysia Super League	Melaka United	1–1	Johor Darul Ta'zim
31	29 August 2022	Malaysia Super League	Johor Darul Ta'zim	4–0	Melaka United

== Head-to-head ranking in Malaysian league ==
Promoted Relegated Melaka dissolved in 2022

P.	82	83	84	85	86	87	88	89	90	91	92	93	94	95	96	97	98	99	00	01	02	03	04	05	06	07	08	09	10	11	12	13	14	15	16	17	18	19	20	21	22	23	24
1		1																															1	1	1	1	1	1	1	1	1	1	1
2																																											
3																											3					3											
4	4																											4	4														
5																																											
6			6																		6					6												6					
7																						7								7							7						
8																																				8				8			
9																															9								9				
10																																									10		
11																				11	11	11																					
12															12																												
13							13							13												13																	
14					14											14																											
15																																											
16																																											
17						17																																					
18																																											
19																																											
20																																											

- Total: Melaka United with 9 higher finishes, JDT with 20 higher finishes (as of the end of the 2024–25 season).
- Title Wins: Of 43 seasons, 12 seasons ended with either a Melaka United or a JDT championship.
- Lowest Finishes: Johor FC's lowest finish was 9th in the 2012 season, and Melaka lowest finish was 17th in the 1987 season. Both teams have been relegated from the top flight.

== Players who played for both clubs ==
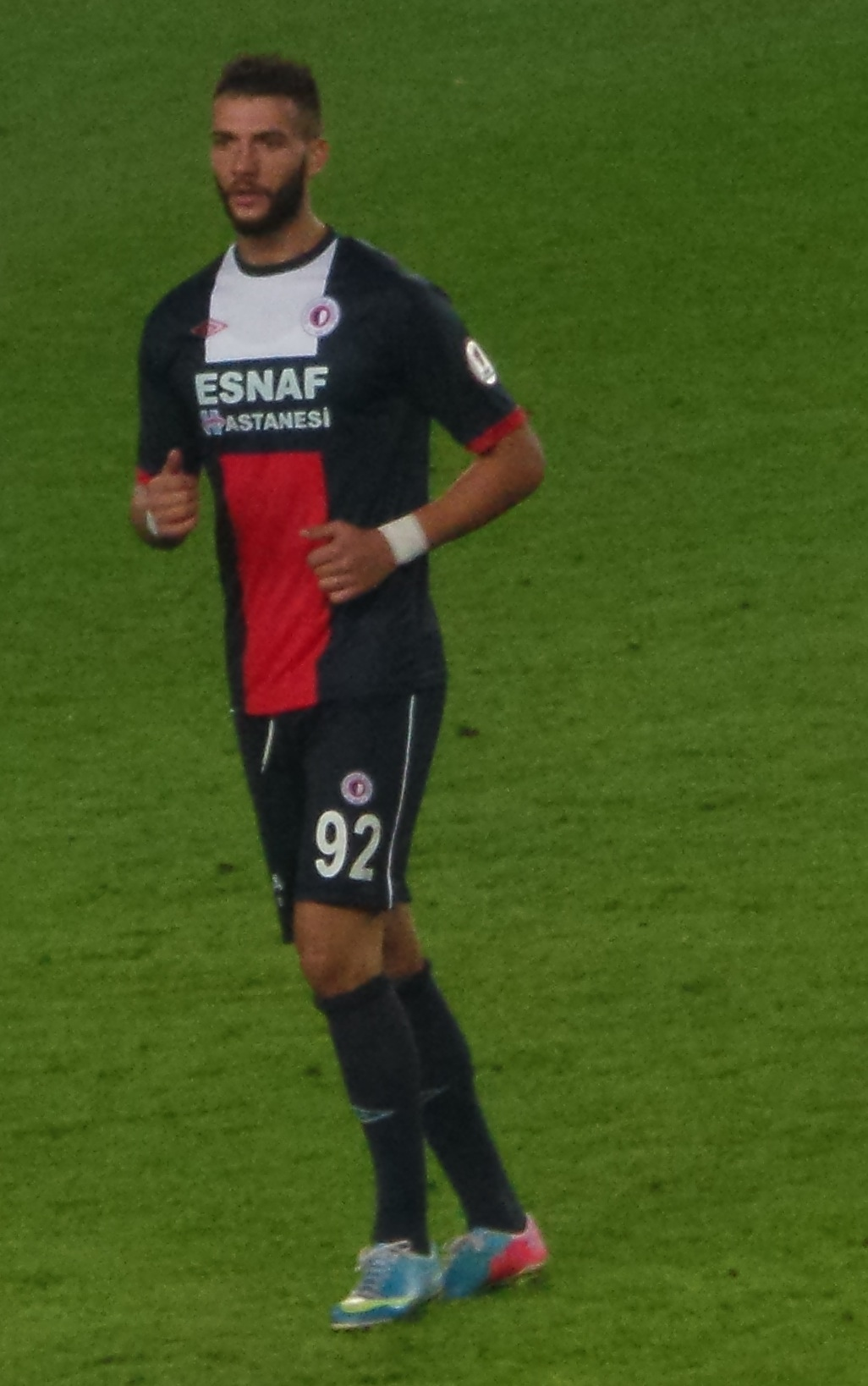
Liridon Krasniqi has made appearances for both Melaka United and Johor Darul Ta'zim.

=== JDT to Melaka United ===
- (Malaysia) Safiq Rahim
- (Malaysia) Che Rashid
- (Malaysia) Hasbullah Abu Bakar
- (Malaysia) Kumaahran Sathasivam
- (Malaysia) Fadhli Shas
- (Malaysia) Syazwan Andik
- (Malaysia) Mohd Amri Yahyah
- (Malaysia) Fandi Othman
- (England) Nicholas Swirad
- (Malaysia) Azinee Taib

=== Melaka United to JDT ===
- (Malaysia) Liridon Krasniqi
- (Argentina) Gustavo Fuentes

== All-time top scorers ==
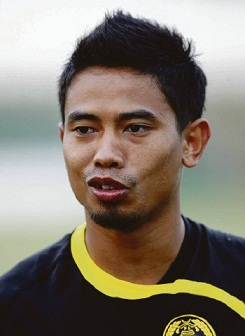
Safiq Rahim is the second all-time top scorer in the Johor Darul Ta'zim–Melaka United rivalry with 4 goals.

As of 22 March 2026, the top scorer of all time in the jdt-melaka united rivalry is Bérgson with 7 goals scored, all for Johor Darul Ta'zim. The top scorer for Melaka United in the rivalry matches is Safiq Rahim, with 4 goals scored, for both team.

Rank	Nat.	Player	Goals
1	(Malaysia)	Bérgson	7
2	(Malaysia)	Safiq Rahim	4
3	(Argentina)	Gonzalo Cabrera	3
4	(Argentina)	Leandro Velázquez	2
5	(Malaysia)	Nazmi Faiz	2

== Highest attendance ==
Attendance Records (JDT vs Melaka United)
Rank	Attendance	Date	Competition	Stadium	Ref
1	14,475	9 April 2017	Malaysia Super League	Tan Sri Dato' Haji Hassan Yunos	
2	14,336	15 September 2017	Malaysia Super League	Hang Jebat Stadium	
3	12,000	23 February 2019	Malaysia Super League	Tan Sri Dato' Haji Hassan Yunos	

== Honours ==
As of 2 May 2026

Johor Darul Ta'zim	Competition	Melaka United
Domestic
12	Malaysia Super League (Division 1)	1
1	Malaysia Premier League (Division 2)	1
2	FAM League (Division 3)	1
6	Malaysia Cup	0
5	Malaysia FA Cup	0
10	Charity Shield	0
Continental
1	AFC Cup	0
0	AFC Champions League Elite	0
