= Azmi Mohamed =

Malaysian footballer and coach

Personal information
- Full name: Azmi bin Mohamed
- Date of birth: 25 August 1971 (age 55)
- Place of birth: Johor
- Height: 1.67 m (5 ft 6 in)
- Position: Striker

Senior career*
Years	Team	Apps	(Gls)
1989–1994	Johor		
1995–1997	Negeri Sembilan		
1998–2000	Johor		

International career
1991	Malaysia U-23	5	(0)
1997–1998	Malaysia	7	(4)

Managerial career
- 2011–2012: Johor FA
- 2012: Johor FC (assistant head coach)
- 2013: Johor Darul Takzim FC (caretaker)
- 2014: Johor Darul Takzim II F.C.
- 2015: Young Fighters F.C.
- 2016–2017: Felda United F.C.
- 2019: Kedah FA (assistant)
- 2023: Harini FT (Manager)
- * Club domestic league appearances and goals

Azmi Mohamed (born 25 August 1971) is a Malaysian former professional footballer and the head coach who is currently the manager of Harini FT.

== Playing career ==
A football striker with Johor and Negeri Sembilan in the 1990s, Azmi also played in the Malaysia national under-23 football team in the 1991 Merdeka Tournament and the 1992 Olympic qualification. He also represented the Malaysia national football team at the 1997 Southeast Asian Games where he scored the winning goal against Vietnam and a hat-trick against the Philippines. He also played in the 1998 AFF Championship. Azmi playing honour includes winning the 1998 Malaysia FA Cup with Johor.

== International goals ==
No.	Date	Venue	Opponent	Score	Result	Competition
1.	5 October 1997	Senayan Stadium, Jakarta, Indonesia	Vietnam	1–0	1–0	1997 SEA Games
2.	7 October 1997	Senayan Stadium, Jakarta, Indonesia	Philippines	1–0	4–0	1997 SEA Games
3.	7 October 1997	Senayan Stadium, Jakarta, Indonesia	Philippines	2–0	4–0	1997 SEA Games
4.	7 October 1997	Senayan Stadium, Jakarta, Indonesia	Philippines	4–0	4–0	1997 SEA Games

== Managerial career ==
=== Johor FA, Johor FC and Johor Darul Takzim FC ===
In the 2011 season, Azmi Mohamed entered in football management as manager for Johor FA and guided the team to a top 4 finish. Although Johor FA finished within the top spots, they couldn't gain a promotion spot after mid-season drop in form.

Part way through the 2012 league campaign, K. Devan resigned after Johor FC's poor, with the team at second bottom of the table which meant that they were in relegation zone. Sazali Saidon was quickly put in charge with Azmi Mohamed maintaining his position as vice coach. The club managed to climb to 9th placed, two spots above the relegation zone.

With the appointment of the new PBNJ chairman, Tunku Ismail Idris, Azmi Mohamed was put back as Johor FA head coach whilst Fandi Ahmad was left in-charge for the Johor club.

On 30 July, PBNJ announced that Azmi Mohamed was appointed as Johor Darul Takzim F.C. head coach for the 2013 Malaysia Cup campaign after ex-head coach, Fandi Ahmad resigned by mutual consent with PBNJ.

He was announced as the new head coach of Johor Darul Takzim II F.C. from the 2014 season, the team rebranded from previous name Johor FA.

=== Felda United FC ===
Azmi joined Felda United F.C. as the new head coach replacing departed Irfan Bakti Abu Salim in January 2017, but resigned on 9 February 2017 after only 3 league games.
