= Dunhill (cigarette) =

British cigarette brand

- Product type: Cigarette
- Current owner: British American Tobacco; Alfred Dunhill Limited
- Produced by: British American Tobacco; Alfred Dunhill Limited
- Country: United Kingdom
- Introduced: Westminster, London (10 March 1907; 119 years ago)
- Tagline: "Hygienic cigarette"

Dunhill is a British cigarette brand owned and manufactured by Alfred Dunhill Limited and British American Tobacco. The brand name commemorates the English tobacconist, entrepreneur, and inventor Alfred Dunhill. In the United Kingdom, Dunhill is registered and manufactured in Westminster, City of Westminster, London.

== History ==
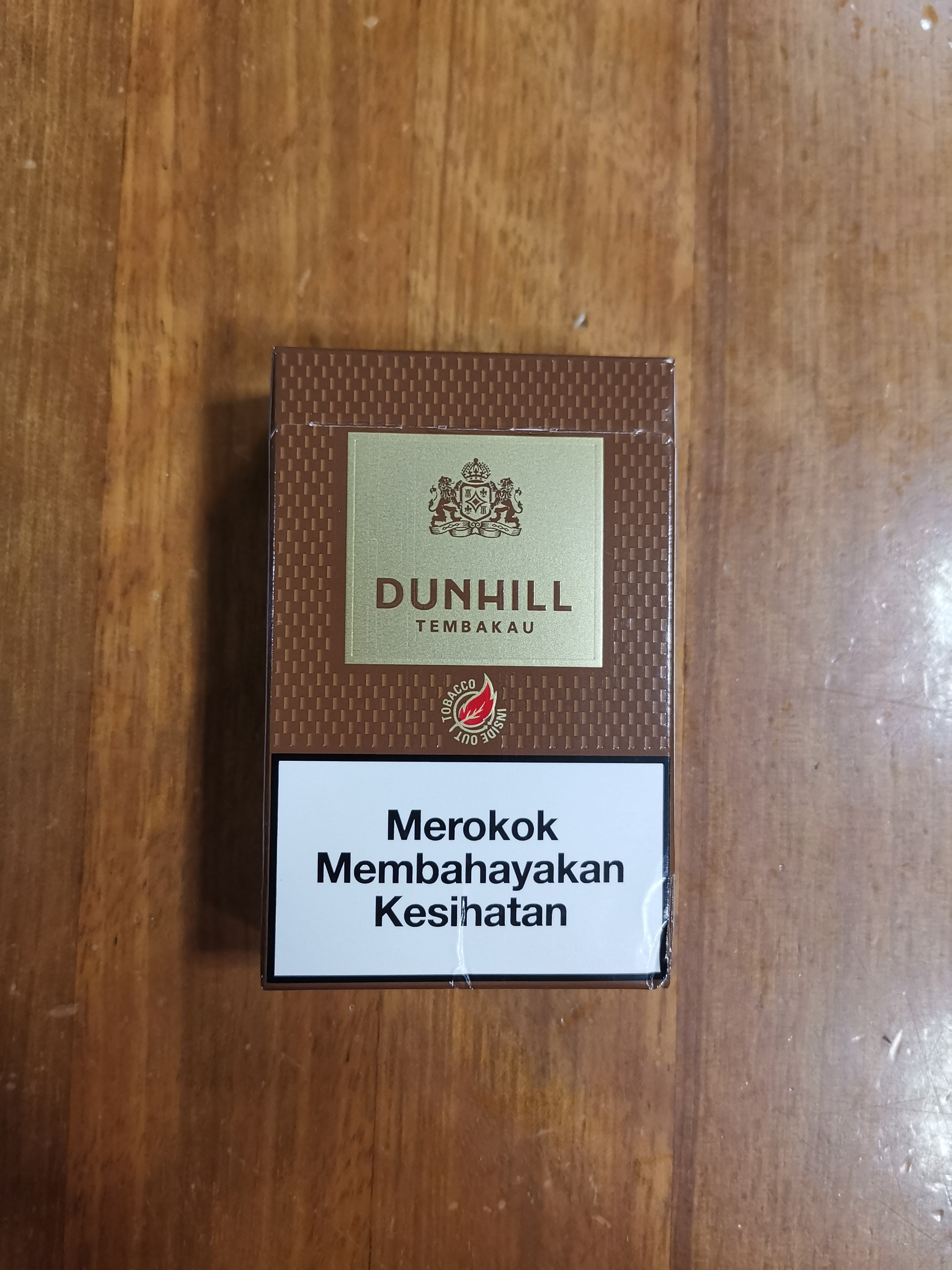
Two packs of Dunhill, (left): Dunhill Tembakau, with a warning saying "Merokok Membahayakan Kesihatan" (Smoking Endangers Health); (right): Dunhill light cigarettes

Dunhill was founded in London on 10 March 1907 when tobacconist and inventor Alfred Dunhill opened a small tobacconist's shop on Duke Street in the St James's area. He offered tobacco blends tailored for the individual customer. Dunhill was introduced in 1908 and was called the Absorbal. It was designed to counter any perceived health risk and had a "world first - cotton wool filter tip. Its slogan was the "Hygienic Cigarette". Dunhill Cigarettes had a royal warrant from 1927 until 1995.

In 1939 the brand was introduced in the United States by Philip Morris USA who leased the marketing rights for the U.S. and in 1962, "Dunhill International" was introduced.

Dunhill cigarettes are usually priced above the average for cigarettes in the region where they are sold due to the use of higher-quality tobacco.

Dunhill cigarettes were favoured by gonzo journalist Hunter S. Thompson.

== See also ==
- Tobacco smoking
