= Edaran Otomobil Nasional =

Malaysian automotive distribution company

Edaran Otomobil Nasional Berhad
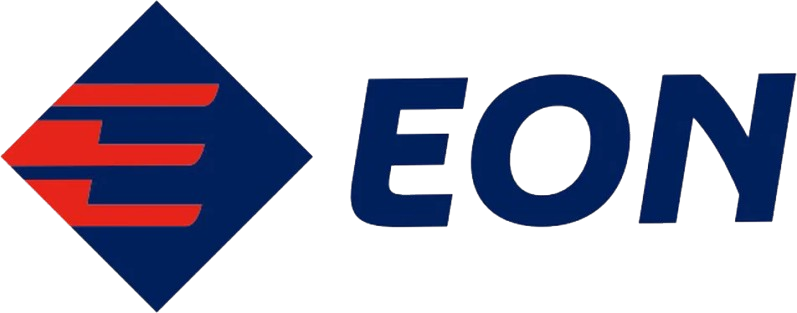
- EON Logo
- Type: Private Limited Company
- Traded as: MYX: 4774
- Industry: Automotive distribution
- Founded: 1984
- Headquarters: Shah Alam, Selangor, Malaysia
- Parent: DRB-HICOM
- Website: www.eon.com.my

Edaran Otomobil Nasional Berhad (Malay for National Automobile Distributions Limited, d.b.a. EON) is one of Malaysia's largest conglomerates which was established in 1984 to distribute Proton cars - Malaysia's first national car. The principal shareholders of the company are DRB-HICOM, Khazanah Nasional Berhad.

Through one of its wholly owned subsidiary, Automotive Conversion Engineering, it undertakes modifications on the Proton range of cars, converted Perdana and Waja model to executives model and a limousine model. It also assembles the classic sports roadster, TD2000 for TD Cars (Malaysia) Sdn Bhd.

Euromobil, another wholly owned subsidiary of the company, was incorporated on 23 October 2002 to import, distribute and market Audi and Volkswagen vehicles and related spare parts, accessories as well as servicing of these vehicles in Malaysia.

EON Automart is another wholly owned subsidiary of the company, which distributing other makes of Mitsubishi. As a re-seller for Mitsubishi makes, it offers various range of Mitsubishi models such as Colt, Evolution range, Grandis and other popular Mitsubishi models. EON Automart also provides after-sales and service of all Mitsubishi models.

Other vehicles made, Suzuki, Hyundai and Inokom are distributed by EONMobil, another wholly owned subsidiary of the company. The company also undertakes the after-sales servicing of the above marque.

Akademi Saga is another subsidiary which provides education on Motor vehicle maintenance and servicing.
