= 1998 Liga Perdana 2 =

- Season: 1998
- Champions: Terengganu; 1st title
- Promoted: Terengganu
- Relegated: PDRM
- Matches played: 112

The 1998 Liga Perdana 2 season was the inaugural season of Liga Perdana 2. A total of eight teams participated in the season.

The lowest four teams from playoff round for Liga Perdana 1 were put into Liga Perdana 2 alongside PDRM, ATM, Negeri Sembilan Chempaka F.C and PKN Johor.

The season kicked off on 4 April 1998. Terengganu won the title and was promoted to Liga Perdana 1.

== Teams ==
Eight teams competing in the first season of Liga Perdana 2.

- Terengganu (1998 Liga Perdana 2 champions)
- Johor
- Kelantan
- (Negeri Sembilan) NS Chempaka
- Johor FC
- Malacca
- (Malaysia) ATM
- PDRM (Relegated to Malaysia FAM League)

== League table ==
1.Terengganu - 30 PTS (1998 Liga Perdana 2 Champions)

2.Johor - 25 PTS

3.Kelantan - 24 PTS

4.NS Chempaka - 22 PTS

5.Johor FC - 16 PTS

6.Malacca - 16 PTS

7.ATM - 14 PTS

8.PDRM - 7 PTS (Relegated to Malaysia FAM League)

== Champions ==
1998 Liga Perdana 2 champion
Terengganu
1st title
