= 1994 Liga Perdana =

1994 Malaysian football league season

Liga Perdana
- Season: 1994
- Champions: (Singapore) Singapore; 1st title
- Matches played: 240

The 1994 Liga Perdana was the inaugural season of the Liga Perdana, a professional football league in Malaysia. A total of 16 teams participated in the league, 14 from Malaysia, along with Singapore and Brunei. It was also the last season that a Singapore-based team played in the Malaysian league until a return with LionsXII in 2012.

The season kicked off in 1994. Singapore dominated the season and ended up winning the title, ahead of Kedah and Sarawak, while Brunei finished last.

== Teams ==
- Brunei
- Johor
- Kedah
- Kelantan
- Kuala Lumpur
- Malacca
- Negeri Sembilan
- Pahang
- Perak
- Perlis
- (Penang) Pulau Pinang
- Sabah
- Sarawak
- Selangor
- Singapore
- Terengganu

== Champions ==
1994 Liga Perdana champions
(Singapore)
Singapore
1st title
