= 1990 Liga Semi-Pro Divisyen 2 =

- Season: 1990
- Champions: Terengganu; 1st Second Division title
- Promoted: Terengganu; Kelantan
- Matches: 112

The 1990 Liga Semi-Pro Divisyen 2 season is the second season of Liga Semi-Pro Divisyen 2. A total of eight teams participated in the season.

Penang and Kelantan were relegated from 1989 Liga Semi-Pro Divisyen 1 and Police was promoted to the league in order to have an even number of teams after three teams were promoted to the first division.

Under the new format, only the top six teams in Divisyen 1 and the Divisyen 2 champions and runners-up will be involved in the Malaysia Cup. Malaysia Cup was played from the quarter-final stage, scheduled for November after the league was finished. The Malaysia Cup quarter-final and semi-final matches will be played on a home and away basis.

The season kicked off on 5 May 1990. Terengganu ended up the season by winning the title.

== Teams ==
Eight teams competing in the second season of Liga Semi-Pro Divisyen 2.

- Terengganu (1989 Liga Semi-Pro Divisyen 2 champions)
- Kelantan (Promoted to Liga Semi-Pro Divisyen 1)
- Negeri Sembilan
- (Malaysia) ATM
- (Malacca) Melaka
- (Penang) Pulau Pinang
- Brunei
- (Malaysia) PDRM

== Champions ==
1990 Liga Semi-Pro Divisyen 2 champion

1st title
