= Hamsani Ahmad =

Malaysian footballer

Mohd Hamsani Ahmad
Personal information
- Full name: Mohd Hamsani bin Ahmad
- Date of birth: 25 February 1976 (age 50)
- Place of birth: Negeri Sembilan, Malaysia
- Height: 1.76 m (5 ft 9 in)
- Position: Goalkeeper

Team information
- Current team: Perak FA (PAFA) (Goalkeeping coach)

Youth career
- 1992–1993: Negeri Sembilan President's

Senior career*
Years	Team	Apps	(Gls)
1994	Negeri Sembilan		
1995–1996	Telekom Melaka		
1997	Malacca		
1998–2001	Negeri Sembilan		
2001–2008	Perak	23	(0)
2008–2010	Selangor		
2010–2012	FELDA United		
2012–2013	Negeri Sembilan		
2014–2015	Selangor		

International career^{‡}
2000–2009	Malaysia	2	(0)
- * Club domestic league appearances and goals as of January 27, 2016 ‡ National team caps and goals as of January 27, 2016

Mohd Hamsani Ahmad (born 25 February 1976) is a Malaysian retired professional footballer who played as a goalkeeper. He was also a former member of Malaysia national football team, making appearances against Japan and Hong Kong in 2004.
