= 1996 Liga Perdana =

- Season: 1996
- Champions: Sabah; 1st title
- Matches played: 210

The 1996 Liga Perdana season was the third season of the Liga Perdana (1994–97). A total of 15 teams participated in the season, 14 from Malaysia and one foreign team, Brunei. The season kicked off on 22 March 1996.

== Teams ==
- Sabah (1996 Liga Perdana champions)
- Sarawak
- Kedah
- Selangor
- Perlis
- Negeri Sembilan
- Perak
- Kuala Lumpur
- Pahang
- (Penang) Pulau Pinang
- Kelantan
- Terengganu
- Johor
- Malacca
- Brunei

== Champions ==
1996 Liga Perdana (1994–97) champions
Sabah
1st title
