= Faizal Zainal =

Malaysian footballer

Personal information
- Full name: Faizal Zainal
- Date of birth: 12 February 1974 (age 52)
- Place of birth: Kampung Batu, Rembau, Negeri Sembilan, Malaysia
- Height: 1.78 m (5 ft 10 in)
- Position: Midfielder

Senior career*
Years	Team	Apps	(Gls)
1992–1999	Negeri Sembilan		
2000	Penang		
2001–2003	Perak		
2003	Selangor		
2004–2006	MPPJ FC		

International career
1994–2004	Malaysia	20	(0)
- * Club domestic league appearances and goals

Faizal Zainal (born 12 February 1974) is a retired Malaysian international footballer.

His twin brother, Khairil Zainal was also a footballer. Their younger brother, Abdul Halim Zainal is currently a footballer with Negeri Sembilan FA, where the twins formerly played for.
