= Liga Perdana (1994–1997) =

- Founded: 5 April 1994; 32 years ago
- Folded: 1997; 29 years ago
- Country: Malaysia
- Other club(s) from: Brunei, Singapore
- Confederation: AFC
- Number of clubs: 15 (from 1995)
- Level on pyramid: 1
- Domestic cup: Piala FA
- League cup: Piala Malaysia
- Last champions: Sarawak (1997)
- Most championships: Singapore; Pahang; Sabah; Sarawak (1 title each)
- Broadcaster(s): RTM
- Current: 1997 Liga Perdana

The Liga Perdana (English: Premier League) was the top-tier football league in Malaysia that operated from 1994 to 1997. It was established to succeed the Liga Semi-Pro and become the fully professional league. At the time it was interchangeably referred as the Malaysian League. The inaugural season started on 5 April 1994. From 1998, its role was replaced by the Liga Perdana 1.

== History ==
In its inaugural season, 16 teams competed in the league. Between 1994 and 1997, there was no second level as the top two leagues were combined. The Liga Perdana was restructured in 1998 (as the Liga Perdana 1 and the Liga Perdana 2). The Liga Perdana 1 consisted of 12 teams, while the Liga Perdana 2 had 8 teams.

== Champions ==
Below is the list of champions of Liga Perdana from 1994 until 1997.

Year	Champions	Runners-up	Third place	Top goalscorer	Goals
1994	Singapore	Kedah	Sarawak	Mohd Hashim Mustapha (Kelantan)	25
1995	Pahang	Selangor	Sarawak	Scott Ollerenshaw (Sabah)	22
1996	Sabah	Kedah	Negeri Sembilan	Scott Ollerenshaw (Sabah)	18
1997	Sarawak	Kedah	Sabah	Laszlo Repasi (Perak)	19
