= 1995 Liga Perdana =

- Season: 1995
- Champions: Pahang; 1st title
- Matches played: 210

The 1995 Liga Perdana season was the second season of the Liga Perdana (1994–97). A total of 15 teams participated in the season, 14 from Malaysia and one from Brunei. Singapore has pulled from the league and paved the creation of the S.League.

The season kicked off in 1995. Pahang dominated the season and ended up winning the title.

== Teams ==
- Pahang
- Sarawak
- Kedah
- Sabah
- Selangor
- Perlis
- Negeri Sembilan
- Perak
- Kuala Lumpur
- (Penang) Pulau Pinang
- Kelantan
- Terengganu
- Johor
- Malacca
- Brunei

== Champions ==
1995 Liga Perdana (1994–97) champions
Pahang
1st title
