= M. Karathu =

Malaysian footballer (born 1943)

Personal information
- Date of birth: 23 February 1943 (age 83)
- Place of birth: Taiping, Perak, Japanese Malaysia (now Malaysia)

Senior career*
Years	Team	Apps	(Gls)
1960–1970	Perak		

International career
1963–1970	Malaysia		

Managerial career
- 1989–1990: Perak
- 1991: Malaysia U21
- 1991–1992: Harimau Muda
- 1993: Kelantan FA
- 1994-1998: Negeri Sembilan
- 1999–2000: Sri Lanka
- 2001: Perak
- 2002–2003: Woodlands Wellington
- 2009: Perak
- 2011: Kelantan
- 2014–2015: Perak
- * Club domestic league appearances and goals

Datuk M. Karathu (born 23 February 1943) is a Malaysian football manager/head coach and former player.

== Playing career ==
Karathu played for Perak FA in the 1960s to 1970s, winning two Malaysia Cup. He also played for Malaysia national football team.

== Coaching career ==
Karathu started his coaching career in 1971, winning Burnley Cup (the precursor to Razak Cup) with Perak under-20 team. He also has coached the Kinta Indian Association (KIA) team in the FAM Cup.

Karathu have been at the helm of Negeri Sembilan FA, Perak FA in three stints, Malaysia national under-21 football team, winning 1991 TAAN Cup invitation tournament in Nepal with Malaysia B team, Woodlands Wellington in Singapore, and Sri Lanka national team. By coaching Sri Lanka, he was one of a few Malaysians to coach a foreign national team.

As head coach, his success at club level includes winning the first ever FA Cup for Perak over the fancied Selangor team in 1990. In 2001, he coached Perak to the finals of the Malaysia Cup. He also guided Kelantan to the semi-finals of Malaysia Cup in 1993. In 2011, he guided Kelantan to win the Sultan Haji Ahmad Shah Cup title and 2011 Super League Malaysia championship.

Karathu resigned as head coach of Kelantan, ending his second spell with the East Coast team in 2011, after failing to defend their 2010 Malaysia Cup title by losing to Terengganu FA in the quarter-finals of the 2011 Malaysia Cup tournament.

In December 2014, Karathu returned for the fourth time to coach Perak after the previous coach Vjeran Simunic was sacked less than 2 months after taking charge. Under his guidance Perak were briefly topping the league in the early stages, but after poor performances in the later stages of the league, Karathu was relieved of his position in early August 2015.
