= 1999 Liga Perdana 1 =

- Season: 1999
- Champions: Pahang; 1st title
- Relegated: Kedah
- Matches played: 90

The 1999 Liga Perdana 1 was the second season of the Liga Perdana 1. A total of 10 teams participated in the season.

Terengganu was promoted from the Liga Perdana 2. The season kicked off on March 20, 1999.

== Teams ==
- Pahang (1999 Liga Perdana 1 champions)
- Penang
- Negeri Sembilan
- Sabah
- Kuala Lumpur
- Sarawak
- Brunei
- Terengganu
- Perak
- Kedah (Relegated to Liga Perdana 2)

== Champions ==
1999 Liga Perdana 1 champions
Pahang
1st title
