= 1998 Liga Perdana 1 =

- Season: 1998
- Champions: Penang; 1st title
- Relegated: Selangor; Perlis; Olympic 2000
- Matches played: 90

The 1998 Liga Perdana 1 was the inaugural season of the Liga Perdana 1. A total of 12 teams participated in the season, based from 10 best performing teams from the previous domestic season. Penang and Olympic 2000 joined after winning the qualifying tournament. The season kicked off on April 4, 1998.

== Teams ==
- Penang (1998 Liga Perdana 1 champions)
- Pahang
- Brunei
- Kedah
- Sabah
- Sarawak
- Perak
- Kuala Lumpur
- Negeri Sembilan
- Selangor (Relegated to Liga Perdana 2)
- Perlis (Relegated to Liga Perdana 2)
- (Malaysia) Olympic 2000 (Relegated to Liga Perdana 2)

== Champions ==
1998 Liga Perdana 1 champions
Penang
1st title
