= Liga Perdana 1 =

- Founded: 4 April 1998; 28 years ago
- Folded: 2 August 2003; 22 years ago
- Country: Malaysia
- Other club from: Brunei
- Confederation: AFC
- Number of clubs: 13 (from 2003)
- Level on pyramid: 1
- Relegation to: Liga Perdana 2
- Domestic cup: Piala FA
- League cup: Piala Malaysia
- Last champions: Perak (2003)
- Most championships: Pulau Pinang (2 titles); Perak (2 titles)
- Broadcaster(s): RTM
- Current: 2003 Liga Perdana 1

The Liga Perdana 1 or Liga Perdana Satu (English: Premier League 1) was the top-tier professional football league in Malaysia that operated from 1998 to 2003.

The league was established to succeed the Liga Perdana. It was then succeeded in 2004 by the formation of the Liga Super. The first game was played on 4 April 1998. The last champions of Liga Perdana 1 is Perak, which won the league for the second straight season.

== Champions ==
Below is the list of champions of Liga Perdana from 1998 until 2003.

Year	Champions	Runners-up	Third place	Leading goalscorer	Goals
1998	Penang	Pahang	Brunei	Vyacheslav Melnikov (Pahang)	17
1999	Pahang	Penang	Negeri Sembilan	Azman Adnan (Penang)	13
2000	Selangor	Penang	Perak	Azizul Kamaluddin (Pahang)	12
2001	Penang (2)	Terengganu	Kelantan	Norizam Ali Hassan (Perak)	13
2002	Perak	Selangor	Sabah	Muhamad Khalid Jamlus (Perak)	17
2003	Perak (2)	Kedah	Perlis	Phillimon Chepita (Perlis)	23
