= 2023 Malaysia Cup final =

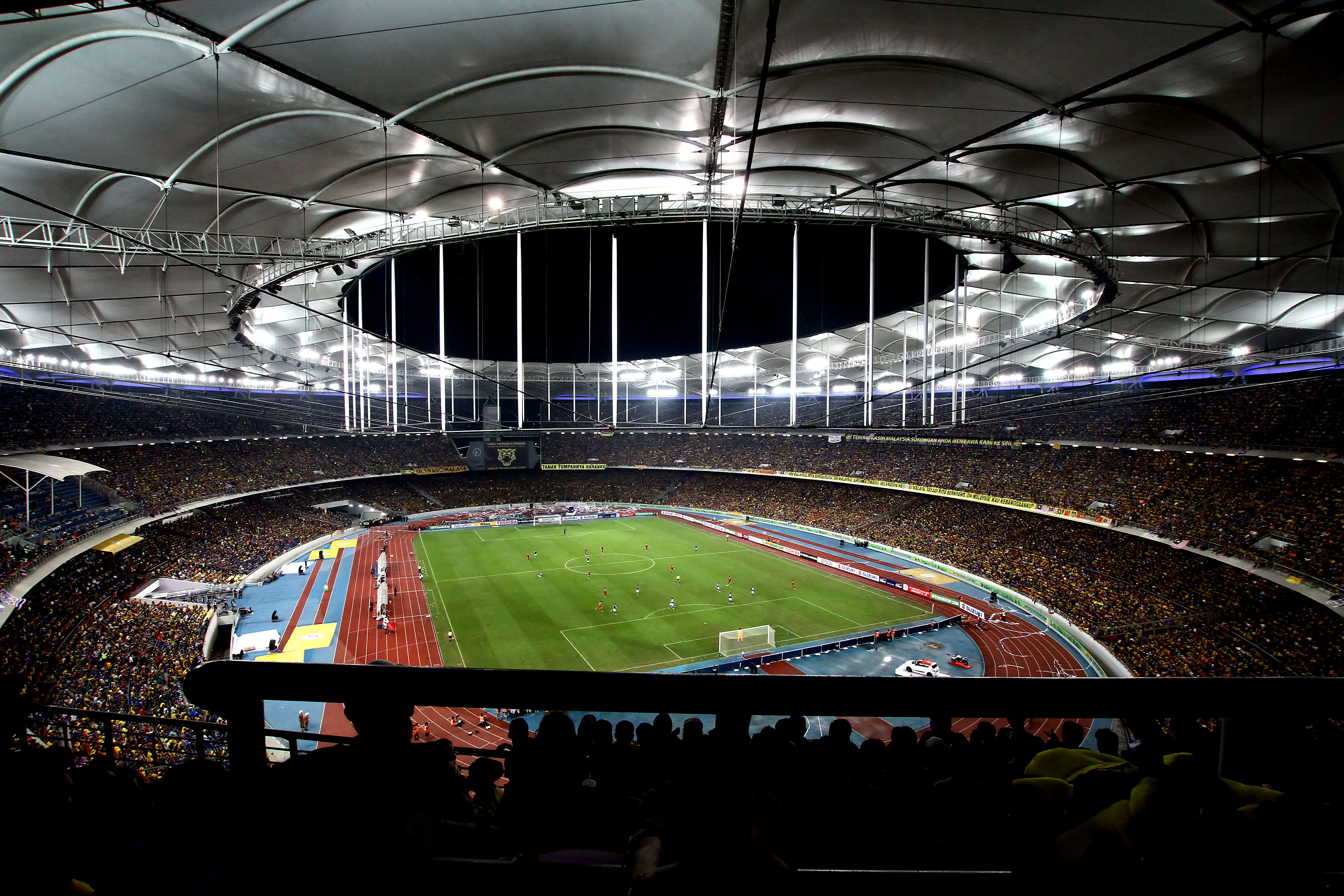
- The match took place at Bukit Jalil National Stadium.
- Event: 2023 Malaysia Cup
Johor Darul Ta'zim	Terengganu
3	1
- Date: 8 December 2023
- Venue: Bukit Jalil National Stadium, Bukit Jalil, Kuala Lumpur
- Man of the Match: Arif Aiman (Johor Darul Ta'zim)
- Referee: S. Logeswaran (Malaysia)
- Attendance: 80,550
- Weather: Rainy; 26 °C (79 °F)

The 2023 Malaysia Cup final was a football match played on 8 December 2023, to determine the champion of the 2023 Malaysia Cup. It was the final game of the 97th edition of the Malaysia Cup, organized by the Football Association of Malaysia.

The final was played at the Bukit Jalil National Stadium in Bukit Jalil, Kuala Lumpur. The match featured Johor Darul Ta'zim, defending champions of the competition, and Terengganu.

The final was refereed by S. Logeswaran in front of 80,550 spectators. Johor Darul Ta'zim scored first in the opening six minutes from Bergson, but Terengganu came back with goals from Ivan Mamut to level the match by the end of half time. Feroz Baharudin and Arif Aiman scored the winner in second half to secured a 4th victory in the competition for Johor Darul Ta'zim, also successfully defend the title.

== Teams ==
In the following table, finals until 1966 were in the Malaya Cup era, and since 1967 were in the Malaysia Cup era.

Team	Previous final appearances (bold indicates winners)
Johor Darul Ta'zim	5 (2014, **2017**, **2019**, 2021, **2022**)
Terengganu	6 (1973, 1982, 1998, **2001**, 2011, 2018)

== Route to the final ==
The Malaysia Cup began with 16 teams in a single-elimination knockout cup competition. There were a total of three rounds leading up to the final. Teams were drawn against each other, and the winner after 90 minutes would advance. If still tied, 30 minutes of extra time was played. If the score was still level, a penalty shoot-out was used to determine the winner.

Johor Darul Ta'zim			Round	Terengganu
Opponent	Result	Legs		Opponent	Result	Legs
Kelantan	15–1	5–1 away; 10–0 home	Round of 16	Kuala Lumpur Rovers	7–0	4–0 away; 3–0 home
Negeri Sembilan	7–1	3–0 away; 4–1 home	Quarter-finals	Selangor	3–1	2–0 home; 1–1 away
Perak	12–2	4–1 away; 8–1 home	Semi-finals	Kuala Lumpur City	4–2	2–1 away; 2–1 home

== Match ==
=== Details ===
Team List and Official

8 December 2023
21:00 UTC+8

Johor Darul Ta'zim	3–1	Terengganu
Bergson 6' (pen.); Feroz 73'; Arif Aiman 90+4' (pen.)	Report	Mamut 21' (pen.)

Bukit Jalil National Stadium, Kuala Lumpur
Attendance: 80,550
Referee: S. Logeswaran (Malaysia)

**Johor Darul Ta'zim**	**Terengganu**

GK	33	(Malaysia) Syihan Hazmi
RB	2	(Malaysia) Matthew Davies	(yellow card) 63'
CB	5	(Indonesia) Jordi Amat (c)	(yellow card) 21'
CB	14	(Australia) Shane Lowry	(substituted off) 60'
LB	22	(Malaysia) Corbin-Ong	(substituted off) 48'
CM	4	(Malaysia) Afiq Fazail	(substituted off) 85'
CM	6	(Malaysia) Hong Wan
RM	42	(Malaysia) Arif Aiman	(yellow card) 90+5'
AM	37	(Brazil) Heberty
LM	45	(Italy) Fernando Forestieri	(substituted off) 85'
CF	9	(Brazil) Bergson
Substitutes:
GK	26	(Malaysia) Farizal Marlias
DF	15	(Malaysia) Feroz Baharudin	(yellow card) 87'	(substituted on) 60'
DF	32	(Malaysia) Shahrul Saad
DF	91	(Malaysia) Syahmi Safari	(yellow card) 68'	(substituted on) 48'
MF	8	(Malaysia) Safiq Rahim	(substituted on) 85'
MF	19	(Malaysia) Akhyar Rashid
MF	20	(Spain) Juan Muñiz
MF	30	(Malaysia) Natxo Insa	(substituted on) 85'
FW	28	(Malaysia) Syafiq Ahmad
Coach:
(Argentina) Esteban Solari

GK	38	(Malaysia) Suhaimi Husin
RB	6	(Malaysia) Azam Azmi
CB	5	(Malaysia) Shahrul Nizam
CB	24	(Malaysia) Safwan Mazlan
LB	32	(Malaysia) Ubaidullah Shamsul	(substituted off) 83'
CM	10	(Bahrain) Habib Haroon (c)	(yellow card) 54'	(substituted off) 75'
CM	97	(Uzbekistan) Nurillo Tukhtasinov	(substituted off) 83'
RM	69	(Malaysia) Hakim Hassan	(substituted off) 75'
AM	22	(Malaysia) Engku Nur Shakir	(yellow card) 41'	(substituted off) 79'
LM	11	(Haiti) Sony Nordé
CF	7	(Croatia) Ivan Mamut
Substitutes:
GK	1	(Malaysia) Rahadiazli Rahalim
DF	2	(Malaysia) Arif Fadzilah
DF	3	(Uzbekistan) Sardor Kulmatov	(substituted on) 83'
MF	8	(Malaysia) Liridon Krasniqi	(yellow card) 90+2'	(substituted on) 83'
MF	13	(Malaysia) Zuasyraf Zulkiefle
MF	18	(Malaysia) Syaiful Haqim	(substituted on) 75'
MF	46	(Malaysia) Syahmi Zamri
FW	9	(Thailand) Adisak Kraisorn	(substituted on) 79'
FW	88	(Malaysia) Nik Sharif	(substituted on) 75'
Coach:
(Croatia) Tomislav Steinbrückner

Man of the Match:
Arif Aiman (Johor Darul Ta'zim)

Assistant referees:
Farhan Abdul Aziz
Nadziran Eziz
Fourth official:
Juhairi Idris
Reserve assistant referee:
Fitri Maskon
Ahmad Zuhadi Dzulkifli

**Match rules**

- 90 minutes
- 30 minutes of extra time if necessary
- Penalty shoot-out if scores still level
- Nine named substitutes
- Maximum of five substitutions, with a sixth allowed in extra time (Note: Each team was given only three opportunities to make substitutions, with a fourth opportunity in extra time, excluding substitutions made at half-time, before the start of extra time and at half-time in extra time.)

== See also ==
- 2023 Malaysia FA Cup
