= 2023 Malaysia Cup knockout stage =

Knockout stage of Malaysia Cup 2023

The 2023 Malaysia Cup knockout stage began on 3 August with the round of 16 and ended in 8 December 2023 with the final at the Bukit Jalil National Stadium, Kuala Lumpur, to decide the champions of the 2023 Malaysia Cup. A total of 16 teams competed in the knockout stage.

== Schedule ==
The draw for the 2023 Malaysia Cup was held on 15 June 2023.

Phase	Round	First leg	Second leg
Knockout phase	Round of 16	3–5 August 2023	18–20 August 2023
Knockout phase	Quarter-finals	13 & 15–17 September 2023	23–25 September 2023
Knockout phase	Semi-finals	19 & 21 October 2023	2–3 November 2023
Knockout phase	Final	8 December 2023	

== Format ==
Each tie in the knockout phase, apart from the final, was played over two legs, with each team playing one leg at home. The team that scored more goals on aggregate over the two legs advanced to the next round. If the aggregate score was level, then 30 minutes of extra time was played (the away goals rule was not applied). If the score was still level at the end of extra time, the winners were decided by a penalty shoot-out. In the final, which was played as a single match, if the score was level at the end of normal time, extra time was played, followed by a penalty shoot-out if the score was still level. The mechanism of the draws for each round was as follows:

- In the draw for the round of 16, the eight group winners were seeded, and the eight group runners-up were unseeded. The seeded teams were drawn against the unseeded teams, with the seeded teams hosting the second leg.

== Bracket ==
The bracket was decided after the draw for the round of 16, which was held on 15 June 2023.

Round of 16
Kuching City	0	1	1
Sabah	3	1	4
Perak	3	1	4
Kedah Darul Aman	1	2	3
Kelantan United	0	2	2
Negeri Sembilan	1	4	5
Kelantan	1	0	1
Johor Darul Ta'zim	5	10	15
Penang	0	0	0
Kuala Lumpur City	4	1	5
Harini Selangor	2	0	2
Sri Pahang	3	2	5
Kuala Lumpur Rovers	0	0	0
Terengganu	4	3	7
PDRM	1	2	3
Selangor	4	1	5

Quarter-finals
Sabah	2	0	2
Perak	2	1	3
Negeri Sembilan	0	1	1
Johor Darul Ta'zim	3	4	7
Kuala Lumpur City	1	1	2
Sri Pahang	0	1	1
Terengganu	2	1	3
Selangor	0	1	1

Semi-finals
Perak	1	1	2
Johor Darul Ta'zim	4	8	12
Kuala Lumpur City	1	1	2
Terengganu	2	2	4

Final
Johor Darul Ta'zim	3
Terengganu	1

== Round of 16 ==
=== Summary ===
The first legs were played on 3, 4, and 5 August, and the second legs were played on 18, 19 and 20 August 2023. The losers were transferred to the MFL Challenge Cup.

Team 1	Agg.	Team 2	1st leg	2nd leg
Perak	4–3	Kedah Darul Aman	3–1	1–2
Penang	0–5	Kuala Lumpur City	0–4	0–1
PDRM	3–5	Selangor	1–4	2–1
Kelantan	1–15	Johor Darul Ta'zim	1–5	0–10
Kuala Lumpur Rovers	0–7	Terengganu	0–4	0–3
Harini Selangor	2–5	Sri Pahang	2–3	0–2
Kelantan United	2–5	Negeri Sembilan	0–1	2–4
Kuching City	1–4	Sabah	0–3	1–1

=== Matches ===
3 August 2023
20:15

Perak	3–1	Kedah Darul Aman
Guaycochea 48' (pen.); Milunović 55'; Hakimi 86'	Report	Ott 1'

Perak Stadium, Ipoh
Attendance: 4,088
Referee: Usaid Jamal
18 August 2023
21:00

Kedah Darul Aman	2–1	Perak
Hidalgo 28' (pen.); Akmal 83'	Report	Seo 85'

Darulaman Stadium, Alor Setar
Attendance: 9,110
Referee: Razlan Joffri Ali

Perak won 4–3 on aggregate.

3 August 2023
21:00

Penang	0–4	Kuala Lumpur City
	Report	Tchétché 4', 26'; Zhafri 31'; Morales 84'

City Stadium, George Town
Attendance: 1,201
Referee: Zamzaidi Katimin
18 August 2023
20:15

Kuala Lumpur City	1–0	Penang
Tchétché 70'	Report

Kuala Lumpur Stadium, Cheras
Attendance: 570
Referee: Fusser Mad Sallih

Kuala Lumpur City won 5–0 on aggregate.

3 August 2023
21:00

PDRM	1–4	Selangor
Hadi 25'	Report	Ayron 57', 64'; Harith 74'; Orozco 90+1'

MBPJ Stadium, Petaling Jaya
Attendance: 2,100
Referee: Nafeez Abd Wahab
19 August 2023
17:30

Selangor	1–2	PDRM
Orozco 25'	Report	Nabil 32'; Harith 90+3' (o.g.)

MBPJ Stadium, Petaling Jaya
Attendance: 7,041
Referee: Abang Azharudin Abdullah

Selangor won 5–3 on aggregate.

4 August 2023
20:15

Kelantan	1–5	Johor Darul Ta'zim
Khala'if 85'	Report	Bergson 6'; Heberty 15', 24'; Shahrul 50'; Nazmi 67'

Sultan Muhammad IV Stadium, Kota Bharu
Attendance: 1,700
Referee: Khairulsyahmi Ahmad Khalidi
19 August 2023
21:00

Johor Darul Ta'zim	10–0	Kelantan
Bergson 21', 43', 73'; Kunimoto 24', 37'; Muñiz 54'; Sham 59'; Heberty 61'; Arif Aiman 64'; Aysar 90+3'	Report

Sultan Ibrahim Stadium, Iskandar Puteri
Attendance: 11,719
Referee: Khirulazuan Kidam

Johor Darul Ta'zim won 15–1 on aggregate.

4 August 2023
20:15

Kuala Lumpur Rovers	0–4	Terengganu
	Report	Mamut 18', 45+2', 67'; Shakir 51'

Kuala Lumpur Stadium, Cheras
Attendance: 495
Referee: Khirulazuan Kidam
18 August 2023
21:00

Terengganu	3–0	Kuala Lumpur Rovers
Hakim 31', 90'; Krasniqi 71'	Report

Sultan Mizan Zainal Abidin Stadium, Kuala Nerus
Attendance: 3,623
Referee: Fairuzi Mat Desa

Terengganu won 7–0 on aggregate.

4 August 2023
21:00

Harini Selangor	2–3	Sri Pahang
Fikri 59'; Norshahrul 74'	Report	Rowley 19'; Syazwan 54'; Baqiuddin 90+2'

Tuanku Abdul Rahman Stadium, Paroi
Attendance: 161
Referee: Faizudin Ismail
20 August 2023
17:30

Sri Pahang	2–0	Harini Selangor
Sherman 43', 51'	Report

Darul Makmur Stadium, Kuantan
Attendance: 1,470
Referee: Fitri Maskon

Sri Pahang won 5–2 on aggregate.

5 August 2023
17:30

Kelantan United	0–1	Negeri Sembilan
	Report	Selvaraj 28'

Sultan Muhammad IV Stadium, Kota Bharu
Attendance: 194
Referee: Suhaizi Shukri
20 August 2023
21:00

Negeri Sembilan	4–2	Kelantan United
Casagrande 7'; Barathkumar 19'; Htet Aung 34'; Ezzejjari 87' (pen.)	Report	Porteria 3'; Indra 66' (pen.)

Tuanku Abdul Rahman Stadium, Paroi
Attendance: 805
Referee: Kamil Zakaria

Negeri Sembilan won 5–2 on aggregate.

5 August 2023
20:15

Kuching City	0–3	Sabah
	Report	Machado 4', 7'; Ting 15'

Sarawak State Stadium, Kuching
Attendance: 763
Referee: Tuan Mohd Yaasin
19 August 2023
20:15

Sabah	1–1	Kuching City
Rizal 27'	Report	Rames 58'

Likas Stadium, Kota Kinabalu
Attendance: 6,214
Referee: Ahmad Zuhadi Dzulkifli

Sabah won 4–1 on aggregate.

== Quarter-finals ==
=== Summary ===
The first legs were played on 13, 15, 16 & 17 September, and the second legs were played on 23, 24 and 25 September 2023.

Team 1	Agg.	Team 2	1st leg	2nd leg
Negeri Sembilan	1–7	Johor Darul Ta'zim	0–3	1–4
Sabah	2–3	Perak	2–2	0–1
Terengganu	3–1	Selangor	2–0	1–1
Kuala Lumpur City	2–1	Sri Pahang	1–0	1–1

=== Matches ===
13 September 2023
21:00

Negeri Sembilan	0–3	Johor Darul Ta'zim
	Report	Arif Aiman 20'; Bergson 31' (pen.), 90+1'

Tuanku Abdul Rahman Stadium, Paroi
Attendance: 5,960
Referee: Suhaizi Shukri
23 September 2023
21:00

Johor Darul Ta'zim	4–1	Negeri Sembilan
Bergson 6', 11'; Muñiz 29'; Forestieri 90+1'	Report	Zamri 39'

Sultan Ibrahim Stadium, Iskandar Puteri
Attendance: 10,561
Referee: Usaid Jamal

Johor Darul Ta'zim won 7–1 on aggregate.

15 September 2023
20:15

Sabah	2–2	Perak
Darren 4'; Machado 46'	Report	Guaycochea 10'; Zack 54'

Likas Stadium, Kota Kinabalu
Attendance: 6,216
Referee: Tuan Mohd Yaasin
25 September 2023
21:00

Perak	1–0	Sabah
Zack 45'	Report

Perak Stadium, Ipoh
Attendance: 14,852
Referee: Razlan Joffri Ali

Perak won 3–2 on aggregate.

16 September 2023
21:00

Terengganu	2–0	Selangor
Mamut 45+2' (pen.); Syahmi 90+4'	Report

Sultan Mizan Zainal Abidin Stadium, Kuala Nerus
Attendance: 13,118
Referee: Fitri Maskon
24 September 2023
21:00

Selangor	1–1	Terengganu
Safuwan 69'	Report	Mamut 23' (pen.)

MBPJ Stadium, Petaling Jaya
Attendance: 10,743
Referee: Hasrol Amir

Terengganu won 3–1 on aggregate.

17 September 2023
20:15

Kuala Lumpur City	1–0	Sri Pahang
Morales 73' (pen.)	Report

Kuala Lumpur Stadium, Cheras
Attendance: 1,697
Referee: Zamzaidi Katimin
24 September 2023
17:30

Sri Pahang	1–1	Kuala Lumpur City
Brundo 90+5' (pen.)	Report	Morales 29'

Darul Makmur Stadium, Kuantan
Attendance: 4,041
Referee: Fusser Mad Sallih

Kuala Lumpur City won 2–1 on aggregate.

== Semi-finals ==
=== Summary ===
The first legs were played on 19 and 21 October 2023, and the second legs were played on 2 and 3 November 2023.

Team 1	Agg.	Team 2	1st leg	2nd leg
Perak	2–12	Johor Darul Ta'zim	1–4	1–8
Kuala Lumpur City	2–4	Terengganu	1–2	1–2

=== Matches ===
19 October 2023
21:00

Perak	1–4	Johor Darul Ta'zim
Guaycochea 76'	Report	Arribas 7'; Arif Aiman 12'; Shahrul 71'; Nazmi 80'

Perak Stadium, Ipoh
Attendance: 21,613
Referee: S. Logeswaran
2 November 2023
21:00

Johor Darul Ta'zim	8–1	Perak
Arif Aiman 12'; Bergson 27', 60'; Heberty 32', 90+1'; Forestieri 52'; Syafiq 62', 78'	Report	Firdaus 90+4'

Sultan Ibrahim Stadium, Iskandar Puteri
Attendance: 14,485
Referee: Razlan Joffri Ali

Johor Darul Ta'zim won 12–2 on aggregate.

21 October 2023
21:00

Kuala Lumpur City	1–2	Terengganu
Tchétché 90+5' (pen.)	Report	Mamut 45+2'; Sharif 88'

Kuala Lumpur Stadium, Cheras
Attendance: 4,210
Referee: Usaid Jamal
3 November 2023
21:00

Terengganu	2–1	Kuala Lumpur City
Mamut 42', 68'	Report	Morales 52'

Sultan Mizan Zainal Abidin Stadium, Kuala Nerus
Attendance: 25,221
Referee: Nazmi Nasaruddin

Terengganu won 4–2 on aggregate.

== Final ==
The final was played on 8 December 2023 at the Bukit Jalil National Stadium in Kuala Lumpur.

8 December 2023
21:00 UTC+8

Johor Darul Ta'zim	3–1	Terengganu
Bergson 6' (pen.); Feroz 73'; Arif Aiman 90+4' (pen.)	Report	Mamut 21' (pen.)

Bukit Jalil National Stadium, Kuala Lumpur
Attendance: 80,550
Referee: S. Logeswaran
