= 2024–25 Malaysia Super League =

Malaysian football season

Malaysia Super League
- Season: 2024–25 Malaysia Super League
- Dates: 10 May 2024 – 20 April 2025
- Champions: Johor Darul Ta'zim; 11th Super League titles 11th Liga M titles
- Champions League Elite: Johor Darul Ta'zim
- Champions League Two: Selangor
- Matches: 156
- Goals: 474 (3.04 per match)
- Top goalscorer: Bérgson (32 goals)
- Biggest home win: Johor Darul Ta'zim 9–0 Kelantan Darul Naim (10 April 2025)
- Biggest away win: Kelantan Darul Naim 0–7 Selangor (8 March 2025)
- Highest scoring: Johor Darul Ta'zim 9–0 Kelantan Darul Naim (10 April 2025)
- Longest winning run: 12 matches Johor Darul Ta'zim
- Longest unbeaten run: 24 matches Johor Darul Ta'zim
- Longest winless run: 13 matches Kelantan Darul Naim
- Longest losing run: 11 matches Kelantan Darul Naim
- Highest attendance: 21,365; Johor Darul Ta'zim 4–0 Terengganu (26 July 2024)
- Lowest attendance: 92; PDRM 0–2 Sri Pahang (8 March 2025)
- Total attendance: 577,334
- Average attendance: 3,725
- All statistics correct as of complete.

The 2024–25 Malaysia Super League (Malay: Liga Super Malaysia 2024–25) was the 21st season of the Malaysia Super League, the top-tier professional football league in Malaysia since its establishment in 2004, and the 43rd season of top-flight Malaysian football overall.

This is the first season to have a two-year schedule, since the 2007–08. This is the first time the league officially applies video assistant referee (VAR) technology. The defending champion from the 2023 season is Johor Darul Ta'zim.

On 24 February 2025, Johor Darul Ta'zim were crowned Super League champions for a record 11th time with four matches to spare.

== Teams ==
=== Team changes ===
The following teams have changed division since the 2023 season.

==== To Malaysia Super League ====
Promoted from the MBSB Bank Championship

- None^{^{1}}

==== From Malaysia Super League ====
Expelled from the Malaysia Super League

- Kelantan^{^{2}}

=== Name changes ===
- Kelantan United was rebranded to Kelantan Darul Naim

Notes:

^1 No team met the licensing requirements
^2 Failed to appeal licensing

== Stadiums and locations ==
Team	Location	Stadium	Capacity
Johor Darul Ta'zim	Iskandar Puteri	Sultan Ibrahim Stadium	40,000
Kedah Darul Aman	Alor Setar	Darul Aman Stadium	32,387
Kelantan Darul Naim	Kota Bharu	Sultan Muhammad IV Stadium	22,000
Kuala Lumpur City	Cheras	Kuala Lumpur Stadium	18,000
Kuching City	Kuching	Sarawak State Stadium	26,000
Negeri Sembilan	Seremban	Tuanku Abdul Rahman Stadium	45,000
PDRM	Selayang	Selayang Stadium	16,000
Penang	George Town	City Stadium	20,000
Perak	Ipoh	Perak Stadium	42,500
Perak	Seri Manjung	Manjung Municipal Council Stadium	15,000
Sabah	Kota Kinabalu	Likas Stadium	35,000
Selangor	Petaling Jaya	Petaling Jaya Stadium	10,661
Sri Pahang	Temerloh	Temerloh Mini Stadium (Note: Sri Pahang played their home games at Temerloh Mini Stadium due to the renovation of Darul Makmur Stadium)	10,000
Terengganu	Kuala Nerus	Sultan Mizan Zainal Abidin Stadium	50,000

Locations of teams in the 2024–25 Malaysia Super League

=== Personnel and kits ===
Team	Head coach	Captain	Kit manufacturer	Kit sponsors	
Team	Head coach	Captain	Kit manufacturer	Main	Other(s)
Johor Darul Ta'zim	(Venezuela) Héctor Bidoglio	(Indonesia) Jordi Amat	Nike	JDT Fan Token	List: Side: None; Back: None; Sleeves: JCORP; Shorts: None
Kedah Darul Aman	(Malaysia) Victor Andrag (interim)	(Malaysia) Akmal Zahir	ALX	Arab Street	List: Side: None; Back: Arab Street, Cosmic Mesra Rakyat, Anak Sena, aL-ikhsan SPORTS; Sleeves: Electrica, BerryPay; Shorts: None
Kelantan Darul Naim	(Malaysia) Rezal Zambery (interim)	(Malaysia) Hafizal Mohamad	PUC Sport	Visit Kelantan 2024	List: Side: pucX; Back: Konsortium Mutiara, Eniq World Group, Summerlife; Shoulders: Madoo Bee, ROHM Semiconductor; Shorts: None
Kuala Lumpur City	(Croatia) Miroslav Kuljanać	(Malaysia) Paulo Josué	HUNDRED	UBB Amanah Berhad / KL Bandaraya Rendah Karbon	List: Side: None; Back: None; Shoulders: DBKL; Shorts: None
Kuching City	(Singapore) Aidil Sharin	(Nigeria) James Okwuosa	StarSports	Press Metal	List: Back: City of Unity; Shoulders: LSC; Shorts: SS Starsport; Socks: SS Starsport
Negeri Sembilan	(Malaysia) K. Nanthakumar	(Malaysia) Nasrullah Haniff	Kelme	Matrix Concept / NR / MBI	List: Side: None; Back: NSFC Sports Physio Centre, IRC; Sleeves: Seremban Engineering Berhad, Gemencheh Granite Sdn Bhd; Shorts: None
PDRM	(Malaysia) Eddy Gapil (interim)	(Nigeria) Faith Friday Obilor	Lotto	redONE mobile	List: Side: None; Back: Cosmic; Sleeves: Hertz, beone prepaid; Shoulders: Electrica, Suria; Shorts: None
Penang	(Malaysia) Wan Rohaimi	(Brazil) Rafael Vitor	Kaki Jersi	Penang2030	List: Side: None; Back: Untuk Sukan Kita!; Sleeves: PDC, Mat Saleh Barber; Shorts: None
Perak	(Malaysia) Yusri Che Lah	(Argentina) Luciano Guaycochea	Cheetah	XOX	List: Side: None; Back: OneXOX, Symphony Life; Sleeves: Visit Perak 2024, KDDI Malaysia; Shorts: None
Sabah	(Slovakia) Martin Stano	(South Korea) Park Tae-soo	Lotto	Jetama	List: Side: None; Back: aL-ikhsan SPORTS, Maju Jaya; Shoulders: Sabah Energy, Asian Supply Base; Shorts: None
Selangor	(Japan) Katsuhito Kinoshi	(Singapore) Safuwan Baharudin	Joma	PKNS / MBI	List: Back: Daikin, Citadelpay, Sugarbomb; Shoulders: Khind, extrajoss; Sleeves: MBPJ, KjS, KDEB Waste Management; Shorts: None
Sri Pahang	(Singapore) Fandi Ahmad	(Malaysia) Ezequiel Agüero	Voltra	Invest Pahang	List: Side: None; Back: Arwana group; Sleeves: None; Shorts: None
Terengganu	(Malaysia) Badrul Afzan Razali (interim)	(Malaysia) Safawi Rasid	ALX	Agarbomb Performance	List: Back: AQM Agro Tech, Ladang Rakyat Terengganu, aeonBiG, Rimba Razia; Sleeves: SATU, EPIC; Shoulders: TDM, estiFlex; Shorts: aL-ikhsan SPORTS

=== Coaching changes ===
Note: Flags indicate national team as has been defined under FIFA eligibility rules. Players may hold more than one non-FIFA nationality.

Team	Outgoing coach	Manner of departure	Date of vacancy	Position in table	Incoming coach	Date of appointment
Kelantan Darul Naim	(Malaysia) Nazrulerwan Makmor	End of contract	31 December 2023	Pre-season	(South Korea) Park Jae-hong	19 April 2024
Johor Darul Ta'zim	(Argentina) Esteban Solari	Mutual agreement	1 January 2024	Pre-season	(Venezuela) Héctor Bidoglio	1 January 2024
Selangor	(Malaysia) Tan Cheng Hoe	Mutual agreement	28 February 2024	Pre-season	(Malaysia) Nidzam Jamil	16 March 2024
Negeri Sembilan	(Malaysia) K. Devan	End of contract	6 March 2024	Pre-season	(Malaysia) Azzmi Aziz	18 April 2024
Kuala Lumpur City	(Croatia) Nenad Baćina	Mutual agreement	16 March 2024	Pre-season	(Croatia) Miroslav Kuljanać	16 March 2024
PDRM	(Malaysia) Yunus Alif	Redesignated	3 April 2024	Pre-season	(Malaysia) P. Maniam	6 April 2024
Negeri Sembilan	(Malaysia) Azzmi Aziz	Sacked	15 August 2024	12th	(Malaysia) K. Nanthakumar	15 August 2024
Terengganu	(Croatia) Tomislav Steinbrückner	Resigned	1 October 2024	3rd	(Malaysia) Badrul Afzan Razali (interim)	1 October 2024
Selangor	(Malaysia) Nidzam Jamil	Resigned	30 October 2024	2nd	(Malaysia) Abdifitaah Hassan (interim)	30 October 2024
Penang	(Malaysia) Akmal Rizal	Redesignated	1 November 2024	11th	(Malaysia) Wan Rohaimi	14 November 2024
Selangor	(Malaysia) Abdifitaah Hassan (interim)	End of interim	24 November 2024	2nd	(Japan) Katsuhito Kinoshi	24 November 2024
Kedah Darul Aman	(Malaysia) Nafuzi Zain	Resigned	24 November 2024	10th	(Malaysia) Victor Andrag (interim)	24 November 2024
Sabah	(Malaysia) Ong Kim Swee	End of Contract	30 November 2024	3rd	(Malaysia) Alto Linus (interim)	30 November 2024
Sabah	(Malaysia) Alto Linus (interim)	End of Interim	10 December 2024	3rd	(Slovakia) Martin Stano	10 December 2024
Kelantan Darul Naim	(South Korea) Park Jae-hong	Resigned	24 January 2025	11th	(Malaysia) Rezal Zambery (interim)	24 January 2025
PDRM	(Malaysia) P. Maniam	Sacked	25 February 2025	8th	(Malaysia) Eddy Gapil (interim)	25 February 2025

== Standings ==
=== League table ===
Pos	Team	Pld	W	D	L	GF	GA	GD	Pts	Qualification or relegation
1	Johor Darul Ta'zim (C)	24	23	1	0	90	8	+82	70	Qualification for the AFC Champions League Elite league stage & ASEAN Club Championship
2	Selangor	24	16	4	4	44	16	+28	52	Qualification for the AFC Champions League Two group stage & ASEAN Club Championship (Note: Since the winners of the 2024 Malaysia FA Cup (Johor Darul Ta'zim) qualified for AFC competition based on their league positions, the berth is awarded to the 2nd-placed team in the league.)
3	Sabah	24	11	7	6	41	33	+8	40	
4	Kuching City	24	10	9	5	38	28	+10	39	
5	Terengganu	24	9	8	7	35	26	+9	35	
6	Kuala Lumpur City	24	11	4	9	40	33	+7	31 (Note: On 5 Aug 2024, Kuala Lumpur City were deducted six points for inaccurate or false declarations in their club licensing application.)	
7	Perak	24	8	6	10	36	36	0	30	Withdrawn from Super League (Note: Perak and Sri Pahang withdrew at end of season and dissolved. Not applying for a national licence.)
8	Sri Pahang	24	7	8	9	35	39	−4	29	Withdrawn from Super League
9	PDRM	24	7	6	11	24	35	−11	27	
10	Penang	24	6	8	10	31	38	−7	26	
11	Kedah Darul Aman (Note: MFL officially snubs Kedah Darul Aman club licensing approval.)	24	6	6	12	21	51	−30	21 (Note: On 5 April 2024, Kedah Darul Aman were deducted three points for failing to pay players and staff on time following previous MFL rules breaches in the 2023 season.)	Ejected from Super League and relegated to A1 Semi-Pro League
12	Negeri Sembilan	24	4	4	16	23	49	−26	16	
13	Kelantan Darul Naim	24	2	1	21	16	82	−66	7	

Source: MFL
Rules for classification: 1) Points; 2) Goal difference; 3) Goals scored;
(C) Champions

=== Position by round ===
Team ╲ Round	1	2	3	4	5	6	7	8	9	10	11	12	13	14	15	16	17	18	19	20	21	22	23	24	25	26
Johor Darul Ta'zim	1	1	1	1	1	1	1	1	1	1	1	1	1	1	1	1	1	1	1	1	1	1	1	1	1	1
Selangor	13	6	4	2	2	2	2	2	2	2	2	2	2	2	2	2	2	2	2	2	2	2	2	2	2	2
Sabah	7	4	3	4	4	3	6	4	5	4	4	4	3	3	3	3	3	3	3	3	3	3	4	3	3	3
Kuching City	5	8	9	11	8	7	5	6	4	5	5	6	7	5	5	5	5	5	4	4	4	4	3	4	4	4
Terengganu	2	2	2	3	3	4	3	3	3	3	3	3	4	4	4	4	4	4	5	5	5	5	5	5	5	5
Kuala Lumpur City	4	9	10	6	5	5	4	5	6	7	10	7	5	7	7	7	6	8	8	10	10	8	6	6	6	6
Perak	12	13	8	10	11	8	9	10	11	10	7	5	6	6	6	6	8	7	6	6	7	7	7	7	7	7
Sri Pahang	3	3	5	7	10	10	10	11	10	8	9	10	8	8	9	9	10	11	11	11	11	11	10	9	9	8
PDRM	11	5	6	5	9	11	11	9	8	9	6	8	9	9	8	8	7	9	9	7	6	6	8	8	8	9
Penang	6	7	7	9	7	9	7	7	7	6	8	9	11	11	11	10	11	10	10	9	8	9	9	10	10	10
Kedah Darul Aman	8	10	11	8	6	6	8	8	9	11	11	11	10	10	10	11	9	6	7	8	9	10	11	11	11	11
Negeri Sembilan	9	11	13	13	13	13	12	12	12	12	12	13	12	13	13	13	13	12	12	12	12	12	12	12	12	12
Kelantan Darul Naim	10	12	12	12	12	12	13	13	13	13	13	12	13	12	12	12	12	13	13	13	13	13	13	13	13	13

Leader & Qualification for 2025-26 AFC Champions League Elite
Qualification for 2025–26 AFC Champions League Two
Qualification for the 2025–26 ASEAN Club Championship
Qualification for the 2025–26 ASEAN Club Championship

Source: MFL

== Results ==
=== Results table ===
Home \ Away	JDT	KDA	KDN	KLC	KUC	NSE	PDRM	PEN	PRK	SAB	SEL	SRP	TER
Johor Darul Ta'zim		6–0	9–0	3–0	2–1	3–1	4–0	5–0	2–0	4–0	3–0	3–0	4–0
Kedah Darul Aman	1–6		3–0	2–3	1–1	2–2	1–1	1–0	0–2	1–1	0–1	2–2	1–0
Kelantan Darul Naim	1–6	0–1		1–3	0–3	1–2	1–0	0–3	1–3	2–3	0–7	1–1	1–2
Kuala Lumpur City	1–5	5–0	5–2		1–1	2–1	2–1	4–2	1–2	3–0	1–0	0–0	0–2
Kuching City	0–2	3–0	1–0	3–1		1–1	2–0	2–2	1–1	1–2	2–1	2–2	1–1
Negeri Sembilan	0–4	2–0	2–3	0–3	1–3		1–2	0–2	0–1	1–2	0–4	2–1	0–2
PDRM	1–1	0–1	5–0	2–1	0–2	2–1		1–1	1–1	1–0	1–1	1–3	1–0
Penang	0–3	0–1	3–0	1–0	1–1	2–2	2–0		3–3	0–4	1–1	0–1	0–0
Perak	0–5	1–1	7–0	1–0	1–2	0–0	2–3	0–2		2–4	1–2	0–1	2–2
Sabah	1–3	5–2	4–1	1–1	2–1	2–0	1–0	0–0	0–1		1–2	2–2	1–1
Selangor	0–3	1–0	2–0	1–0	4–0	4–0	2–0	4–1	2–1	0–0		2–0	1–0
Sri Pahang	1–3	6–0	1–0	1–1	0–2	0–2	5–1	3–2	0–3	2–3	1–1		1–5
Terengganu	0–1	3–0	3–0	1–2	2–2	3–2	1–1	1–0	3–1	2–2	0–1	1–1	

Source: MFL
Legend: Blue = home team win; Yellow = draw; Red = away team win.
For upcoming matches, an "a" indicates there is an article about the rivalry between the two participants.

=== Results by match played ===
Team ╲ Round	1	2	3	4	5	6	7	8	9	10	11	12	13	14	15	16	17	18	19	20	21	22	23	24	25	26
Johor Darul Ta’zim	W	W	W	W	W	W	D	W	W	W	W	W	–	W	W	W	W	W	W	W	W	W	W	W	W	–
Kedah Darul Aman	W	L	L	W	W	D	–	L	D	L	D	L	W	D	L	D	W	W	L	–	L	L	L	L	D	L
Kelantan Darul Naim	L	L	L	W	L	L	L	L	L	–	L	W	L	D	L	L	L	L	L	L	L	L	–	L	L	L
Kuala Lumpur City	D	–	L	W	W	D	W	L	L	W	L	W	W	L	–	L	W	L	D	D	W	W	W	L	L	W
Kuching City	D	D	L	D	W	D	W	D	W	L	–	L	D	W	W	L	D	W	W	D	D	W	W	–	L	W
Negeri Sembilan	–	L	L	L	W	L	L	L	D	L	D	L	D	–	L	L	L	W	L	L	L	W	D	L	W	L
PDRM	L	W	D	L	L	–	D	W	W	L	W	D	D	D	D	L	W	L	–	L	W	L	L	L	W	L
Penang	D	D	D	L	W	L	W	D	–	L	D	L	L	L	L	W	L	D	D	W	D	–	L	W	W	L
Perak	L	L	W	L	L	W	L	–	L	W	W	W	L	D	D	D	L	D	W	D	–	L	D	W	L	W
Sabah	D	W	W	–	L	W	L	W	L	D	L	W	W	W	W	W	–	L	W	D	D	D	D	W	D	L
Selangor	L	W	W	W	L	W	D	W	W	W	W	–	D	L	W	W	W	W	D	W	W	D	L	W	–	W
Sri Pahang	W	D	–	L	L	D	D	L	D	W	D	L	W	D	L	–	L	L	D	L	D	L	W	W	W	W
Terengganu	W	D	W	D	–	L	W	W	D	D	L	D	L	D	W	W	D	–	L	W	L	W	D	L	L	W

Updated to match(es) played on 20 April 2025. Source: MFL
W = Win; D = Draw; L = Lose; P = Postponed

== Season statistics ==
- First goal of the season: 33 seconds
  - (Malaysia) Syafiq Ahmad for Kedah Darul Aman (A) against PDRM (11 May 2024)
- Fastest goal in a match: 27 seconds
  - (Chile) Ronnie Fernández for Selangor (A) against Terengganu (28 September 2024)
- Latest goal in a match: 90+12 minutes
  - (Nigeria) Ifedayo Olusegun for PDRM (A) against Perak (18 May 2024)
- Oldest goalscorer in a match: 36 years 5 months 4 days
  - (Ivory Coast) Kipré Tchétché for Kuching City (H) against Sri Pahang (19 May 2024)

=== Top goalscorers ===
As of 20 April 2025

Rank	Player	Club	Goals
1	(Brazil) Bérgson	Johor Darul Ta'zim	32
2	(Malaysia) Paulo Josué	Kuala Lumpur City	17
3	(Ghana) Jordan Mintah	Kuching City	12
4	(Argentina) Luciano Guaycochea	Perak	11
5	(Malaysia) Romel Morales	Johor Darul Ta'zim	10
5	(Brazil) Rodrigo Dias	Penang	10
5	(Cape Verde) Alvin Fortes	Selangor	10
5	(Chile) Ronnie Fernández	Selangor	10
9	(Nigeria) Ifedayo Olusegun	PDRM	8
9	(Brazil) Clayton da Silveira	Perak	8
9	(Liberia) Kpah Sherman	Sri Pahang	8
12	(Malaysia) Arif Aiman	Johor Darul Ta'zim	7
12	(Brazil) Heberty	Johor Darul Ta'zim	7
12	(Brazil) João Pedro	Sabah	7
12	(Argentina) Stefano Brundo	Sri Pahang	7
12	(Malaysia) Safawi Rasid	Terengganu	7

=== Top assists ===
As of 20 April 2025

Rank	Player	Club	Assist
1	(Spain) Juan Muñiz	Johor Darul Ta'zim	8
2	(Malaysia) Arif Aiman	Johor Darul Ta'zim	7
2	(Brazil) Bérgson	Johor Darul Ta'zim	7
2	(Brazil) Heberty	Johor Darul Ta'zim	7
5	(Australia) Dylan Wenzel-Halls	Penang	5
5	(Malaysia) Azfar Fikri	Perak	5
5	(Malaysia) Quentin Cheng	Selangor	5
5	(Malaysia) Stuart Wilkin	Sabah	5
5	(Japan) Takumi Sasaki	Negeri Sembilan	5

=== Hat-tricks ===
As of 11 April 2025

Player	For	Against	Result	Date
(Brazil) Heberty	Johor Darul Ta'zim	Sri Pahang	3–0 (H)	22 June 2024
(Brazil) Bérgson	Johor Darul Ta'zim	Terengganu	4–0 (H)	26 July 2024
(Brazil) Bérgson	Johor Darul Ta'zim	Kedah Darul Aman	6–0 (H)	9 August 2024
(Malaysia) Paulo Josué	Kuala Lumpur City	Kedah Darul Aman	5–0 (H)	14 September 2024
(Brazil) Bérgson	Johor Darul Ta'zim	Kelantan Darul Naim	6–1 (H)	22 September 2024
(Malaysia) Arif Aiman	Johor Darul Ta'zim	Kuala Lumpur City	3–0 (H)	8 December 2024
(Australia) Dylan Wenzel-Halls	Penang	Perak	3–3 (H)	12 January 2025
(Brazil) Rodrigo Dias^{4}	Penang	Kelantan Darul Naim	1–6 (A)	7 February 2025
(Ghana) Jordan Mintah	Kuching City	Kelantan Darul Naim	0–3 (A)	27 February 2025
(Malaysia) Faisal Halim	Selangor	Kelantan Darul Naim	0–7 (A)	8 March 2025
(Brazil) Bérgson	Johor Darul Ta'zim	Kedah Darul Aman	1–6 (H)	29 March 2025
(Brazil) Bérgson^{5}	Johor Darul Ta'zim	Kelantan Darul Naim	9–0 (H)	11 April 2025

Note: ^{4} – player scored 4 goals
Note: ^{5} – player scored 5 goals

=== Clean sheets ===
As of 20 April 2025

Rank	Player	Club	Clean sheets
1	(Malaysia) Syihan Hazmi	Johor Darul Ta'zim	13
2	(Malaysia) Kalamullah Al-Hafiz	Kedah Darul Aman/Selangor	9
3	(Malaysia) Sikh Izhan Nazrel	Penang	7
4	(Malaysia) Haziq Nadzli	Perak	6
5	(Malaysia) Azri Ghani	Kuala Lumpur City	5
6	(Malaysia) Samuel Somerville	Selangor	4

=== Discipline ===
As of 20 April 2025

==== Player ====
- Most yellow cards: 7
  - (Malaysia) Kenny Pallraj (Perak)
  - (Malaysia) Ezequiel Agüero (Sri Pahang)
- Most red cards: 2
  - (Montenegro) Adrijan Rudović (Kuala Lumpur City)
  - (Malaysia) Harith Samsuri (Negeri Sembilan)

==== Club ====
- Most red cards: 5
  - Negeri Sembilan
- Most yellow cards: 54
  - Kuala Lumpur City
- Fewest yellow cards: 31
  - Kelantan Darul Naim
- Fewest red cards: 0
  - Johor Darul Ta'zim
  - Kedah Darul Aman
  - Kelantan Darul Naim

== Attendance to stadium ==
=== Overall attendance ===
Highest Lowest

Home	Away													Attendance	
Home	JDT	KDA	KDN	KLC	KUC	NSE	PDRM	PEN	PRK	SAB	SEL	SRP	TER	Total	Average
Johor Darul Ta'zim	—N/a	15,216	6,664	9,808	14,388	19,988	12,600	13,975	12,517	11,363	0	17,157	21,365	155,041	14,095
Kedah Darul Aman	1,537	—N/a	2,540	639	4,723	1,646	3,446	1,565	9,349	1,699	6,090	1,285	3,281	37,800	3,150
Kelantan Darul Naim	12,570	338	—N/a	818	112	312	2,132	265	1,387	7,778	1,293	717	187	27,909	2,326
Kuala Lumpur City	4,750	1,182	911	—N/a	659	232	345	1,017	1,221	1,029	4,248	1,149	1,376	18,119	1,510
Kuching City	3,018	2,388	1,437	1,210	—N/a	1,337	2,199	2,407	1,200	2,010	5,673	1,400	2,658	26,937	2,245
Negeri Sembilan	4,717	374	955	1,750	271	—N/a	547	389	803	537	1,341	346	694	12,724	1,060
PDRM	5,500	1,574	170	364	117	103	—N/a	631	4,721	416	4,971	92	200	18,859	1,572
Penang	2,246	8,122	1,543	953	933	1,492	448	—N/a	2,002	1,187	2,198	1,104	4,557	26,785	2,232
Perak	11,923	865	1,106	2,458	1,674	872	11,647	5,582	—N/a	2,531	2,587	1,604	2,602	45,451	3,788
Sabah	11,569	5,006	4,922	1,799	5,141	3,154	2,220	3,708	2,892	—N/a	4,652	2,186	5,602	52,851	4,404
Selangor	10,215	10,077	7,465	5,690	5,422	10,365	2,284	8,965	10,112	2,525	—N/a	3,023	2,453	78,596	6,550
Sri Pahang	5,674	516	6,678	956	104	1,028	1,344	633	1,955	1,656	2,973	—N/a	746	24,263	2,022
Terengganu	2,046	4,281	13,411	1,103	853	3,750	4,081	3,211	8,150	1,483	4,419	5,211	—N/a	51,999	4,333
Total League Attendance														577,334	3,725

Last Updated : 20 April 2025

Source : FAM CMS

== See also ==
- 2024 Piala Sumbangsih
- 2024–25 Malaysia A1 Semi-Pro League
- 2024–25 Malaysia A2 Amateur League
- 2024–25 Malaysia A3 Community League
- 2024 Malaysia FA Cup
- 2024–25 Malaysia Cup
- 2024–25 MFL Challenge Cup
- 2024–25 MFL Cup
- 2024–25 Piala Presiden
- 2024–25 Piala Belia
