= Engku Nur Shakir =

Malaysian footballer

Yang Mulia Engku Nur Shakir
Personal information
- Full name: Engku Muhammad Nur Shakir bin Engku Yacob
- Date of birth: 16 October 1998 (age 28)
- Place of birth: Terengganu, Malaysia
- Height: 1.75 m (5 ft 9 in)
- Position: Forward

Team information
- Current team: Star City

Youth career
- 2016–2017: Terengganu III

Senior career*
Years	Team	Apps	(Gls)
2018–2023	Terengganu II	36	(6)
2021–2026	Terengganu	67	(8)
2026–	Star City	0	(0)

International career
2024–	Malaysia	4	(0)
- * Club domestic league appearances and goals as of 4 August 2026

Engku Muhammad Nur Shakir bin Engku Yacob (born 16 October 1998) is a Malaysian professional footballer who plays as a forward for Malaysia Super League club Star City and the Malaysia national team.

== Career ==
Shakir started his football journey from sports school in secondary level. In 2018, he made his debut with Terengganu II in a Malaysia Premier League match against Felcra, coming in as substitutes in the 57th minutes. In 2021, he earn a promotion to the Terengganu first team and made his debut in the 2021 Malaysia Super League away match against Kedah.

== International career ==
Shakir made his debut for the Malaysia national team on 11 June 2024 in a 2026 FIFA World Cup qualifier against Chinese Taipei at the Bukit Jalil National Stadium in a 3–1 win.

On 11 July 2026, Shakir was named in the 26-man team in preparation for the 2026 ASEAN Championship.

== Career statistics ==
As of 4 October 2024.

Appearances and goals by club, season and competition
Club	Season	League			Cup		League Cup		Others		Total	
Club	Season	Division	Apps	Goals	Apps	Goals	Apps	Goals	Apps	Goals	Apps	Goals
Terengganu II	2018	Malaysia Premier League	7	0	–						7	0
Terengganu II	2019	Malaysia Premier League	–						1 (Note: 2019 Malaysia Challenge Cup)	0	1	0
Terengganu II	2020	Malaysia Premier League	11	4	–						11	4
Terengganu II	2021	Malaysia Premier League	10	2	–						10	2
Terengganu II	2022	Malaysia Premier League	8	0	–						8	0
Terengganu II	2023	—	–						1 (Note: 2023 MFL Challenge Cup)	0	1	0
Terengganu II	Total		36	6	–				2	0	38	6
Terengganu	2021	Malaysia Super League	5	1	–		7	0	–		12	1
Terengganu	2022	Malaysia Super League	6	0	3	0	3	0	–		12	0
Terengganu	2023	Malaysia Super League	18	5	3	0	6	1	5 (Note: 2023 AFC Cup)	1	32	7
Terengganu	2024–25	Malaysia Super League	9	0	3	0			(Note: 2024–25 ASEAN Club Championship)		11	0
Terengganu	Total		38	6	9	0	16	1	5	1	68	8

== Personal life ==
He is the 3rd child of four siblings. He has an older sister, older brother, and younger brother. His youngest brother also played for Terengganu at a youth-level club. He is also a member of the Terengganu royal family.

== Honours ==
=== Terengganu ===
- Malaysia FA Cup runner-up:2022
- Malaysia Cup runner-up: 2023

=== Individual ===
- PFAM Player of the Month: August 2023
