= Badrul Afzan =

Malaysian footballer and manager

Personal information
- Full name: Badrul Afzan bin Razali
- Date of birth: 16 December 1976 (age 49)
- Place of birth: Kemaman, Terengganu, Malaysia
- Position: Midfielder

Managerial career
- Years: Team
- 2011–2012: Negeri Sembilan U21
- 2016–2017: Sime Darby (assistant)
- 2018–2019: Terengganu III
- 2020–2022: Terengganu II
- 2022–2024: Terengganu (assistant)
- 2024–2025: Terengganu (caretaker)
- 2025: Terengganu
- 2026: Terengganu FC U-20

Badrul Afzan bin Razali (born 16 December 1976) is a Malaysian football manager and former player. He is currently head coach of Piala Presiden club Terengganu FC U-20.

== Playing career ==
As a player Badrul Afzan played for Terengganu, Pahang, Kelantan, Perlis, Kedah, Johor FC and Felda United.

== Managerial career ==
In December 2022, Badrul Afzan has been promoted to Terengganu from Terengganu II as an assistant coach.

On 1 October 2025, Badrul Afzan has been appointed as the Terengganu caretaker manager after departure of Tomislav Steinbrückner.

On 15 June 2025, Terengganu appointed Badrul Afzan as the club head coach for one-year contract. He previously acted as the club caretaker coach.

== Managerial statistics ==
As of 25 December 2025

Managerial record by team and tenure
Team	Nat.	From	To	Record					Ref.
Team	Nat.	From	To	G	W	D	L	Win %	Ref.
Terengganu II	(Malaysia)	1 January 2021	30 November 2022	38	19	11	8	50.00	
Terengganu	(Malaysia)	1 October 2024	25 December 2025	39	17	8	14	43.59	
Career Total				77	36	19	22	46.75	
