= Fakhrul Azim =

Malaysian footballer (born 1999)

Personal information
- Full name: Muhammad Fakhrul Azim Mohd Zulphatah
- Date of birth: 2 January 1999 (age 27)
- Place of birth: Gong Badak, Kuala Terengganu, Malaysia
- Height: 1.80 m (5 ft 11 in)
- Position: Left winger

Team information
- Current team: PDRM
- Number: 89

Youth career
- –2017: Young Titans FC
- 2017–: Terengganu IV (U-19)

Senior career*
Years	Team	Apps	(Gls)
2019–2020	Terengganu III (U-21)	0	(0)
2023–	PDRM	61	(2)
- * Club domestic league appearances and goals as of 26 May 2026

Muhammad Fakhrul Azim Mohd Zulphatah (born 2 January 1999) is a Malaysian professional footballer who plays as a left winger for PDRM.

== Career ==
Fakhrul Azim was born and raised in Gong Badak, Terengganu. He started his youth career at Terengganu Amateur League team Young Titans FC, transferring to the Terengganu IV (U-19) team when he was 18 years old. He was instrumental in helping his school team in the Majlis Sukan Sekolah Malaysia U-18 championship before he turned professional.

After joining PDRM, Fakhrul Azim won his first-ever career trophy in the 2023 MFL Challenge Cup. In his first season, Fakhrul Azim racked up 21 appearances in the Malaysia Super League.

In the 2024–25 edition of the MFL Challenge Cup, Fakhrul Azim scored the equaliser in the first leg of the quarter-finals against Melaka FC. PDRM reached the final but ultimately lost against Selangor FC in the same competition.

== Personal life ==
Fakhrul Azim is married to Eleya. He was also a constable.

== Honours ==
PDRM FC

- MFL Challenge Cup: 2023; runner-up 2024–25
