= 2023 Malaysia FA Cup =

Tournament details
- Country: Malaysia
- Dates: 8 March – 22 July
- Teams: 20

Final positions
- Champions: Johor Darul Ta'zim (3rd title)
- Runners-up: Kuala Lumpur City

Tournament statistics
- Matches played: 19
- Goals scored: 58 (3.05 per match)
- Attendance: 169,808 (8,937 per match)
- Top goal scorer(s): (4 goals); Arif Aiman
- All statistics correct as of 22 July 2023. (Note: All statistics do not include qualifying play-offs)

The 2023 Malaysia FA Cup is the 33rd edition of the Malaysia FA Cup, a knockout competition for Malaysian association football clubs. The winners, if eligible, would be assured a place in the 2024–25 AFC Champions League Two group stage.

Johor Darul Ta'zim are the defending champions, having beaten Terengganu in the last final and retained the trophy, beating Kuala Lumpur City 2–0 in the final.

== Qualified teams ==
The FA Cup is a knockout competition with 20 teams taking part all trying to reach the Final at Sultan Ibrahim Stadium on 22 July 2023. The competition consisted of 14 teams from the Super League and 6 teams from M3 League.

For this season, there is no draw for the second round matches for the top 6 clubs of the Super League 2022 and the top 2 clubs of the Premier League who qualify automatically to the next round based on the seeding position based on the league position of the 2022 season.

The following teams played in the competition. Reserve teams were excluded.

| Malaysia Super League the 14 teams of the 2023 season | M3 League the 6 teams of the 2023 season |
|---|---|
| Johor Darul Ta'zim; Kedah Darul Aman; Kelantan; Kelantan United; Kuching City; Kuala Lumpur City; Negeri Sembilan; Penang; Perak; PDRM; Sabah; Selangor; Sri Pahang; Terengganu | Immigration; BRM; Manjung City; Melaka; PIB Shah Alam; SAINS |

== Draw dates ==
The draw for the 2023 Malaysia FA Cup was held on 10 February 2023.

| Round | Draw date | Match dates |
|---|---|---|
| First round | 10 February 2023 | 8–25 March 2023 |
| Second round | 10 February 2023 | 14–15 April 2023 |
| Quarter-finals | 10 February 2023 | 27–28 May 2023 |
| Semi-finals | 10 February 2023 | 25–26 June 2023 |
| Final | 10 February 2023 | 22 July 2023 |

== Bracket ==
The bracket was decided after the draw.

First Round
PDRM
Bye
Kedah Darul Aman | 2 (3)
Penang (p) | 2 (4)
PIB Shah Alam
Bye
Perak | 1
Sri Pahang | 2
Melaka
Bye
Manjung City | 2
SAINS | 0
Kelantan United
Bye
Immigration | 1
BRM | 0

Second Round
Johor Darul Ta'zim | 3
PDRM | 0
Kuching City | 0
Penang | 4
Negeri Sembilan | 2
PIB Shah Alam | 0
Selangor | 4
Sri Pahang | 0
Terengganu | 4
Melaka | 0
Manjung City | 0
Kelantan | 3
Sabah | 2
Kelantan United | 0
Kuala Lumpur City | 2
Immigration | 0

Quarter-finals
Johor Darul Ta'zim | 5
Penang | 0
Negeri Sembilan | 1
Selangor | 3
Terengganu | 4
Kelantan | 2
Sabah | 1
Kuala Lumpur City | 2

Semi-finals
Johor Darul Ta'zim | 4
Selangor | 0
Terengganu | 0 (2)
Kuala Lumpur City (p) | 0 (4)

Final
Johor Darul Ta'zim | 2
Kuala Lumpur City | 0

== First round ==
The draw involves the team position for the first round only involving the bottom 3 teams of the Super League season 2022, and also the bottom 3 teams of the Premier League season 2022, along with 6 M3 League teams to find four slots to the second round proper. Based on draw result, the four teams (Kelantan United, Melaka, PIB Shah Alam, PDRM) were given a bye to the second round proper.

Key: (1) = Super League; (3) = M3 League

| 8 March 2023 | Kedah Darul Aman (1) | 2–2 (a.e.t.) (3–4 p) | Penang (1) | Alor Setar |
| 21:00 UTC+8 | Ott 9', 90' | Report | Giovane 22'; Soony 68' | Stadium: Darul Aman Stadium; Attendance: 13,768; Referee: Razlan Joffri Ali |
| | Penalties |
| | Hidalgo (penalty scored); Balotelli (penalty scored); Tuck (penalty missed); Juraboev (penalty scored); Ciger (penalty missed) | | Zaw (penalty scored); Rafael (penalty scored); Hadin (penalty scored); Faris (penalty scored) |

| 8 March 2023 | Perak (1) | 1–2 | Sri Pahang (1) | Ipoh |
| 20:15 UTC+8 | Obiozor 34' | Report | Malik 82'; Brundo 90+4' (pen.) | Stadium: Perak Stadium; Attendance: 4,219; Referee: Kamil Zakaria |

| 25 March 2023 | Manjung City (3) | 2–0 | SAINS (3) | Seri Manjung |
| 22:00 UTC+8 | Syamin 3'; Afeeq 84' | Report | | Stadium: Manjung Stadium; Attendance: 220; Referee: Nawal Zubir |

| 25 March 2023 | Immigration (3) | 1–0 | BRM (3) | Cheras |
| 22:00 UTC+8 | Azim 10' (pen.) | Report | | Stadium: Kuala Lumpur Stadium; Attendance: 208; Referee: Munir Mohd Izam |

| PDRM (1) | Bye |

| PIB Shah Alam (3) | Bye |

| Melaka (3) | Bye |

| Kelantan United (1) | Bye |

== Second round ==
Key: (1) = Super League; (3) = M3 League

The top 6 clubs from the 2022 Super League together with the top 2 clubs from the 2022 Premier League, will automatically qualify for the second round proper.

| 14 April 2023 | Johor Darul Ta'zim (1) | 3–0 | PDRM (1) | Iskandar Puteri |
| 22:00 MYT | Bergson 3', 12' (pen.); Velázquez 27' (pen.) | Report | | Stadium: Sultan Ibrahim Stadium; Attendance: 9,429; Referee: Jeevanathan M. Ponniamoorthy |

| 14 April 2023 | Terengganu (1) | 4–0 | Melaka (3) | Kuala Nerus |
| 22:00 MYT | Mamut 6'; Hakimi 71'; Mintah 82', 90+3' | Report | | Stadium: Sultan Mizan Zainal Abidin Stadium; Attendance: 5,150; Referee: Hasrol Amir |

| 14 April 2023 | Manjung City (3) | 0–3 | Kelantan (1) | Seri Manjung |
| 22:00 MYT | | Report | Arqués 33'; Marong 59', 90' | Stadium: Manjung Stadium; Attendance: 557; Referee: Shukor Zulkiflee |

| 14 April 2023 | Kuala Lumpur City (1) | 2–0 | Immigration (3) | Cheras |
| 22:00 MYT | Saravanan 45+2'; Morales 83' | Report | | Stadium: Kuala Lumpur Stadium; Attendance: 402; Referee: Abdul Rahman Wahab |

| 15 April 2023 | Kuching City (1) | 0–4 | Penang (1) | Kuching |
| 21:15 MYT | | Report | Saad 10'; Rafael 48'; Hadin 65'; Gomes 90+5' | Stadium: Sarawak Stadium; Attendance: 315; Referee: Nasruddin Tamrin |

| 15 April 2023 | Negeri Sembilan (1) | 2–0 | PIB Shah Alam (3) | Paroi, Seremban |
| 22:00 MYT | Casagrande 52'; Shahrel 81' | Report | | Stadium: Tuanku Abdul Rahman Stadium; Attendance: 497; Referee: Shahrizan Solihim |

| 15 April 2023 | Selangor (1) | 4–0 | Sri Pahang (1) | Petaling Jaya |
| 22:00 MYT | Mukhairi 41', 59'; Faisal 67'; Gan 72' | Report | | Stadium: MBPJ Stadium; Attendance: 5,106; Referee: Ahmad Zuhadi Dzulkifli |

| 15 April 2023 | Sabah (1) | 2–0 | Kelantan United (1) | Kota Kinabalu |
| 21:15 MYT | Baddrol 13'; Wilkin 59' | Report | | Stadium: Likas Stadium; Attendance: 4,500; Referee: S. Logeswaran |

== Quarter-finals ==
Key: (1) = Super League; (3) = M3 League

| 27 May 2023 | Terengganu (1) | 4–2 | Kelantan (1) | Kuala Nerus |
| 17:00 MYT | Azam 17'; Mamut 41'; Nordé 52'; Syafik 82' | Report | Akinade 45', 63' (pen.) | Stadium: Sultan Mizan Zainal Abidin Stadium; Attendance: 5,263; Referee: S. Logeswaran |

| 27 May 2023 | Negeri Sembilan (1) | 1–3 | Selangor (1) | Paroi, Seremban |
| 20:15 MYT | Safuwan 1' | Report | Mukhairi 3'; Orozco 60', 87' | Stadium: Tuanku Abdul Rahman Stadium; Attendance: 6,203; Referee: Suhaizi Shukri |

| 28 May 2023 | Sabah (1) | 1–2 | Kuala Lumpur City (1) | Kota Kinabalu |
| 17:45 MYT | Gabriel Peres 6' (pen.) | Report | Morales 30'; Saravanan 44' | Stadium: Likas Stadium; Attendance: 6,797; Referee: Zamzaidi Katimin |

| 28 May 2023 | Johor Darul Ta'zim (1) | 5–0 | Penang (1) | Iskandar Puteri |
| 20:15 MYT | Fané 32' (o.g.); Amat 38'; Arif 49' (pen.); Corbin-Ong 58'; Syafiq 90+2' | Report | | Stadium: Sultan Ibrahim Stadium; Attendance: 14,779; Referee: Ahmad Zuhadi Dzulkfili |

== Semi-finals ==
Key: (1) = Super League; (3) = M3 League

| 25 June 2023 | Terengganu (1) | 0–0 (a.e.t.) (2–4 p) | Kuala Lumpur City (1) | Kuala Nerus |
| 21:00 MYT | | Report | | Stadium: Sultan Mizan Zainal Abidin Stadium; Attendance: 26,540; Referee: Suhaizi Shukri |
| | Penalties |
| | Arif (penalty scored); Sharif (penalty missed); Safwan (penalty scored); Krasniqi (penalty missed) | | Josué (penalty scored); Morales (penalty scored); Akram (penalty scored); Zirdum (penalty missed); Gallifuoco (penalty scored) |

| 26 June 2023 | Johor Darul Ta'zim (1) | 4–0 | Selangor (1) | Iskandar Puteri |
| 21:00 MYT | Arif Aiman 20', 33', 38'; Forestieri 47' | Report | | Stadium: Sultan Ibrahim Stadium; Attendance: 32,257; Referee: Hasrol Amir |

== Final ==
The final will be played at the Sultan Ibrahim Stadium in Johor Bahru.

22 July 2023
21:00 MYT

| Johor Darul Ta'zim (1) | 2–0 | Kuala Lumpur City (1) |
|---|---|---|
| Hong Wan 66'; Velázquez 74' | Report |

Sultan Ibrahim Stadium, Johor Bahru
Attendance: 33,598
Referee: Nazmi Nasaruddin

== Top scorers ==
As of 22 July 2023

| Rank | Player | Club | Goals |
|---|---|---|---|
| 1 | (Malaysia) Arif Aiman | Johor Darul Ta'zim | 4 |
| 2 | (Malaysia) Mukhairi Ajmal | Selangor | 3 |
| 3 | (Argentina) Leandro Velázquez | Johor Darul Ta'zim | 2 |
| 3 | (Brazil) Bergson | Johor Darul Ta'zim | 2 |
| 3 | (Philippines) Manny Ott | Kedah Darul Aman | 2 |
| 3 | (Nigeria) Ismahil Akinade | Kelantan | 2 |
| 3 | (The Gambia) Nuha Marong | Kelantan | 2 |
| 3 | (Colombia) Romel Morales | Kuala Lumpur City | 2 |
| 3 | (Malaysia) T. Saravanan | Kuala Lumpur City | 2 |
| 3 | (Brazil) Giovane Gomes | Penang | 2 |
| 3 | (Lebanon) Soony Saad | Penang | 2 |
| 3 | (Venezuela) Yohandry Orozco | Selangor | 2 |
| 3 | (Croatia) Ivan Mamut | Terengganu | 2 |
| 3 | (Ghana) Jordan Mintah | Terengganu | 2 |
| 15 | 27 players | 11 teams | 1 |

== See also ==
- 2023 Piala Sumbangsih
- 2023 Malaysia Super League
- 2023 Malaysia M3 League
- 2023 Malaysia M4 League
- 2023 Malaysia M5 League
- 2023 Malaysia Cup
- 2023 MFL Challenge Cup
- 2023 MFL Cup
- 2023 Piala Presiden
