= Azzmi Aziz =

Malaysian football manager (born 1975)

Personal information
- Full name: Azzmi bin Ab Aziz
- Date of birth: 24 August 1975 (age 51)
- Place of birth: Malaysia

Team information
- Current team: Bunga Raya FC

Youth career
- 1989–1990: Selangor FA (youth)
- 1991–1992: PDRM FA (youth)
- 1995–1998: Selangor FA (President Cup)

Senior career*
Years	Team	Apps	(Gls)
1993	PDRM FA		
1998–1999	Selangor FA		
2000	Perlis FA		
2001–2002	PKNS FC		

Managerial career
- 2010–2012: Sime Darby FC U21 (assistant)
- 2014–2015: Felda United FC (assistant)
- 2017: ATM FA (President Cup)
- 2017–2018: Kedah FA (assistant)
- 2018: Kedah FA (caretaker)
- 2019: Selangor United U19
- 2019–2022: Negeri Sembilan U23
- 2022–2023: PDRM FC
- 2024–2025: Negeri Sembilan FC
- 2025–2026: Kedah Darul Aman F.C.
- 2025–2026: Bunga Raya FC
- * Club domestic league appearances and goals

Azzmi bin Ab Aziz (born 24 August 1975) is a Malaysian professional football manager and former player who is currently the head coach of Kedah Darul Aman F.C. in the Malaysia A1 Semi-Pro League.

== Playing career ==
=== Club career ===
Azzmi began his playing career in the youth ranks of Selangor FA and PDRM FA during the early 1990s. In 1993, he made his senior debut for PDRM FA in the Semi-Pro Division 2. He returned to Selangor FA in 1995, progressing through their President Cup squad before earning promotion to the senior team in 1998, where he featured in the Malaysia Premier League, Gold Cup, Agong Cup, and represented the club in the AFC Club Championship against Pohang Steelers.

In 2000, Azzmi joined Perlis FA to compete in the Malaysia Premier League. He spent the final two seasons of his playing career with PKNS FC from 2001 to 2002 in the FAM Cup.

=== International career ===
Azzmi represented Malaysia across multiple youth international levels. He was called up to the Malaysia U16 squad for the 1990 Asian Youth Championship in Bangkok and the Malaysia U18 team for the 1992 Asian School Championship. In 1993, he featured for the Malaysia U19 team at the Asian Youth Championship in Kuala Lumpur. He earned a call-up to the Malaysia U23 national team in 1997 for the Nepal Independence Cup in Kathmandu.

== Coaching career ==
=== Early roles and youth development ===
Azzmi transitioned into coaching as an assistant manager for the Sime Darby FC U21 squad between 2010 and 2012. He served as assistant coach at Felda United FC under Azmi Mohamed and Muhammad Nidzam Adzha from 2014 to 2015, operating across the KLFA Super League and FAM Cup.

In May 2017, he briefly took charge of ATM FA's President Cup squad before returning to Kedah FA as an assistant coach. Following the departures of main managerial staff in June 2018, Azzmi served as caretaker head coach of Kedah FA during their 2018 Malaysia Cup group stage campaign. In 2019, he managed Selangor United's U19 team in the Youth Cup before being appointed head coach of Negeri Sembilan's U23 squad, a post he held from December 2019 to October 2022.

=== Early coaching and backroom roles ===
Azzmi began his professional coaching career with Kedah FA, serving as an assistant coach from 2017 to 2018. During his stint at Alor Setar, he worked alongside prominent managers including Tan Cheng Hoe and Muhammad Nidzam Adzha, contributing to backroom operations and match preparation. Between December 2019 and December 2022, Azzmi transitioned into youth development, taking charge of the Negeri Sembilan U23 team in the President Cup competition.

=== PDRM FC ===
In December 2022, Azzmi received his first senior top-flight managerial appointment when he was named head coach of PDRM FC ahead of the 2023 Malaysia Super League season. Tasked with keeping the newly promoted side competitive despite financial and squad constraints, he implemented a structured, counter-attacking system reliant on high work ethic and defensive discipline.

During the 2023 season, Azzmi gained national attention as a "giant-killer" by orchestrating several high-profile upset victories over established Malaysia Super League clubs, including a 1–0 home victory over Selangor FC, as well as victories against Sabah FC and Kedah Darul Aman F.C.. In August 2023, Azzmi and PDRM FC mutually agreed to part ways while the club was comfortably placed eighth in the league standings after 14 matches.

=== Negeri Sembilan FC ===
In February 2024, Azzmi returned to first-team management as the head coach of Negeri Sembilan FC for the 2024–25 Malaysia Super League season. Prioritizing familiarity and tactical cohesion, he reshaped the squad by bringing in players with whom he had previously worked. His tactical setup drew praise from key players, including Japanese defender Takumi Sasaki, who highlighted Azzmi's defensive structure and in-game adjustments as pivotal to the team's improvement.

=== Kedah Darul Aman FC ===
In July 2025, Azzmi was appointed head coach of Kedah Darul Aman F.C. ahead of their campaign in the Malaysia A1 Semi-Pro League, succeeding former coach Victor Andrag. Holding an AFC Pro License, his return to Kedah marked a full circle after having served the club as an assistant nearly a decade earlier.

=== Bunga Raya FC ===
In July 2026, Azzmi took over as head coach of Bunga Raya FC, leading the team's domestic campaign.

=== Senior management ===
In December 2022, Azzmi was appointed head coach of PDRM FC for the 2023 Malaysia Super League season. Known for his defensive organization and counter-attacking tactical setup, he led the team to upset victories against major league teams including Selangor FC, Sabah FC, and Kedah Darul Aman FC. He departed PDRM FC in August 2023 via mutual agreement with the club positioned eighth in the table.

In March 2024, Azzmi was appointed head coach of Negeri Sembilan FC in the Malaysia Super League. He managed the team through May 2025.

In July 2025, Azzmi returned to Kedah Darul Aman F.C. as head coach for their campaign in the Malaysia A1 Semi-Pro League.

== Coaching qualifications ==
Azzmi holds advanced coaching credentials awarded by the Asian Football Confederation and national governing bodies:

- AFC Professional Football Coaching Diploma (2019/2024)
- AFC 'A' Coaching Certificate (2016)
- AFC 'B' Coaching Certificate (2014)
- AFC 'C' Coaching Certificate (2011)
- FIFA Youth Coaching Certification (2016)
- National Sports Science Level 1 (SPKK) (2014)
- National Football Referee Certificate (Class III) (2004)

== Media coverage ==
Azzmi's managerial career and tactical approaches have been frequently covered by Malaysian sports media. During the 2023 Malaysia Super League season, he gained widespread attention for guiding newly promoted PDRM FC to high-profile upset victories over established clubs such as Selangor FC, Sabah FC, and Kedah Darul Aman FC. His subsequent departure from the club in August 2023 was also heavily reported, with media outlets highlighting his successful stint that saw the team positioned eighth in the league prior to his mutual exit.

In April 2024, Azzmi's return to top-flight management as the head coach of Negeri Sembilan FC was extensively covered by national news publications. The following year, his appointment to lead Kedah Darul Aman FC in the 2025 Liga A1 Semi-Pro campaign was highlighted by Sinar Harian and Astro Awani, noting his wealth of experience and past giant-killing record in the domestic leagues.

== Notable quotes ==
Azzmi Aziz has been frequently quoted in Malaysian sports media regarding team performance, player development, and tactical philosophy:

- On team work ethic (PDRM FC):

PDRM FC kurang pemain yang berkualiti tetapi mereka sangat bekerja keras untuk memenangi perlawanan...

— Azzmi Aziz, FlashSukan (4 June 2023)

- On finishing efficiency:

We had chances but failed to score. My players need to be sharper in front of the goal.

— Azzmi Aziz, The Vibes (1 March 2023)

- On player recruitment strategy (Negeri Sembilan FC):

Adalah sangat penting untuk saya bekerja dengan para pemain yang saya kenal kerana saya tahu bagaimana cara kerja mereka.

— Azzmi Aziz, Utusan Malaysia (22 April 2024)

- On squad competitiveness and reinforcements:

Kalau tiada penambahbaikan, Negeri Sembilan akan tertinggal.

— Azzmi Aziz, MakanBola (13 August 2024)

- On accountability to supporters:

Saya Minta Maaf.

— Azzmi Aziz, MakanBola (27 May 2024)

- On work ethic at PDRM FC:

PDRM FC kurang pemain yang berkualiti tetapi mereka sangat bekerja keras untuk memenangi perlawanan...

— Azzmi Aziz, FlashSukan (4 June 2023)

- On squad recruitment at Negeri Sembilan FC:

Adalah sangat penting untuk saya bekerja dengan para pemain yang saya kenal kerana saya tahu bagaimana cara kerja mereka.

— Azzmi Aziz, Utusan Malaysia (22 April 2024)
