= 2023 MFL Challenge Cup =

Piala Cabaran MFL 2023

Tournament details
- Country: Malaysia
- Date: 18 September – 3 December 2023
- Teams: 8

Final positions
- Champions: PDRM
- Runners-up: Kuching City

Tournament statistics
- Matches played: 14
- Goals scored: 44 (3.14 per match)
- Top goal scorer(s): (5 goals); Uche Agba

The 2023 MFL Challenge Cup is the third edition of Malaysia Challenge Cup tournament organised by Football Association of Malaysia (FAM) and Malaysian Football League (MFL). The tournament began on 18 September and ended on 3 December 2023. The qualified teams will compete on the knockout stage to compete in a two-legged single-elimination tournament beginning with the quarterfinals followed by semi-finals and the final. Each tie is played on a home-and-away two-legged basis. The away goals rule, extra time and penalty shoot-out are used to decide the winner if necessary.

A total of 8 teams competed in the knockout phase, which the eight losers of the Malaysia Cup round of 16 will participate into the tournament. This was the first Challenge Cup to be held since the 2019 edition, after the previous 3 years saw the tournament not held due to various circumstances. This was also the first tournament under its new name, the MFL Challenge Cup.

PDRM defeated Kuching City in the final, with 4–1 on aggregate, thus winning the competition for the first time in club history.

== Teams ==
All eight teams eliminated from the Malaysia Cup round of 16 will enter the tournament:

Key to colours
Losers of round of 16 enter 2023 MFL Challenge Cup

Malaysia Cup Round of 16
Team
Harini Selangor
Kedah Darul Aman
Kelantan
Kelantan United
Kuala Lumpur Rovers
Kuching City
PDRM
Penang

== Format ==
Each tie in the knockout phase was played over two legs, with each team playing one leg at home. The team that scored more goals on aggregate over the two legs advanced to the next round. If the aggregate score was level, then 30 minutes of extra time was played (the away goals rule was not applied). If the score was still level at the end of extra time, the winners were decided by a penalty shoot-out. In the final, which was played as a single match, if the score was level at the end of normal time, extra time was played, followed by a penalty shoot-out if the score was still level. The mechanism of the draws for each round was as follows:

- In the draws for the quarter-finals onwards, there were no seedings, and teams from the same association could be drawn against each other. As the draws for the quarter-finals and semi-finals were held together before the quarter-finals were played, the identity of the quarter-final winners was not known at the time of the semi-final draw. A draw was also held to determine which semi-final winner would be designated as the "home" team for the final (for administrative purposes as it was played at a neutral venue).

== Schedule ==
The schedule was as follows (all draws were held at the Malaysian Football League headquarters in Petaling Jaya, Selangor).

Round	First leg	Second leg
Quarter-finals	18–19 September 2023	4–6 October 2023
Semi-finals	21–22 October 2023	4–5 November 2023
Final	29 November 2023	3 December 2023

== Knockout-stage ==
=== Bracket ===
Quarter-finals
Penang	2	3	5
Harini Selangor (a.e.t.)	1	2	3
Kuala Lumpur Rovers	1	1	2
PDRM	2	3	5
Kuching City	1	3	4
Kedah Darul Aman	0	0	0
Kelantan United	7	4	11
Kelantan	0	0	0

Semi-finals
Penang	1	0	1
PDRM	2	2	4
Kuching City	1	2	3
Kelantan United	1	0	1

Final
PDRM	3	1	4
Kuching City	0	1	1

=== Quarter-finals ===
The first legs were played on 18 and 19 September 2023, and the second legs were played on 4, 5 and 6 October 2023.

Team 1	Agg.	Team 2	1st leg	2nd leg
Kelantan United	11–0	Kelantan	7–0	4–0
Kuala Lumpur Rovers	2–5	PDRM	1–2	1–3
Kuching City	4–0	Kedah Darul Aman	1–0	3–0
Penang	5–3	Harini Selangor	2–1	3–2 (a.e.t.)

=== Matches ===
First leg

18 September 2023
21:00

Kelantan United	7–0	Kelantan
Balić 9'; Akinade 18'; Indra 59'; Faiz 74'; Sharvin 79'; Royizzat 88', 90'	Report

Sultan Muhammad IV Stadium, Kota Bharu
Attendance: 710
Referee: Munir Izam

Second leg

4 October 2023
20:15 (Note: The match has been delayed 2 hours due to rain.)

Kelantan	0–4	Kelantan United
	Report	Syazwan 24'; Gomis 60'; Royizzat 69'; Sharvin 72'

Sultan Muhammad IV Stadium, Kota Bharu
Attendance: 275
Referee: Faisal Ridzuan

Kelantan United won 11–0 on aggregate.

First leg

18 September 2023
21:00

Kuala Lumpur Rovers	1–2	PDRM
Ikmal 37'	Report	Suzuki 13'; Nabil 25'

Kuala Lumpur Stadium, Cheras
Attendance: 123
Referee: Shahmi Ismail

Second leg

5 October 2023
20:15

PDRM	3–1	Kuala Lumpur Rovers
Agba 34'; Fakhrul 37'; Okwuosa 59'	Report	Rafie 61'

MBPJ Stadium, Petaling Jaya
Attendance: 73
Referee: Khirulazuan Kidam

PDRM won 5–2 on aggregate.

First leg

19 September 2023
20:15

Kuching City	1–0	Kedah Darul Aman
Kamara 85'	Report

Sarawak State Stadium, Kuching
Attendance: 278
Referee: Faizudin Ismail

Second leg

4 October 2023
21:00

Kedah Darul Aman	0–3	Kuching City
	Report	Kamara 9'; Pedro 73', 89'

Darulaman Stadium, Alor Setar
Attendance: 2,520
Referee: Kamal Ikhwan Yaacob

Kuching City won 4–0 on aggregate.

First leg

19 September 2023
21:00

Penang	2–1	Harini Selangor
Hadin 85'; Soony 90+4'	Report	Fikri 83'

City Stadium, George Town
Attendance: 435
Referee: Fairuzi Mat Desa

Second leg

6 October 2023 (Note: The Harini Selangor v Penang match, originally scheduled on 5 October 2023 were changed to 6 October 2023, and the original venue (Tuanku Abdul Rahman Stadium) has been changed to the new venue (Selayang Stadium).)
21:00

Harini Selangor	2–3 (a.e.t.)	Penang
Badrul 4'; Khyril 90+4'	Report	Vitor 50'; Alif 101'; Soony 118'

Selayang Stadium, Selayang
Attendance: 350
Referee: Amiruddin Lantji

Penang won 5–3 on aggregate.

=== Semi-finals ===
The first legs were played on 21 and 22 October 2023, and the second legs were played on 4 and 5 November 2023.

Team 1	Agg.	Team 2	1st leg	2nd leg
Penang	1–4	PDRM	1–2	0–2
Kuching City	3–1	Kelantan United	1–1	2–0

=== Matches ===
First leg

21 October 2023
17:15

Penang	1–2	PDRM
Adriano 61'	Report	Amir 19'; Fakhrul 76'

City Stadium, George Town
Attendance: 212
Referee: Abang Azharudin Abdullah

Second leg

5 November 2023
21:00

PDRM	2–0	Penang
Agba 59', 82'	Report

MBPJ Stadium, Petaling Jaya
Attendance: 474
Referee: Usaid Jamal

PDRM won 4–1 on aggregate.

First leg

22 October 2023
20:15

Kuching City	1–1	Kelantan United
Bruno 10'	Report	Asraff 42'

Sarawak State Stadium, Kuching
Attendance: 655
Referee: Nafeez Abd Wahab

Second leg

4 November 2023
16:45

Kelantan United	0–2	Kuching City
	Report	Kamara 40'; Bruno 63'

Sultan Muhammad IV Stadium, Kota Bharu
Attendance: 862
Referee: Suhaizi Shukri

Kuching City won 3–1 on aggregate.

=== Final ===
The first leg was played on 29 November 2023, and the second leg was played on 3 December 2023.

Team 1	Agg.	Team 2	1st leg	2nd leg
PDRM	4–1	Kuching City	3–0	1–1

=== Matches ===
First leg

29 November 2023
20:15

PDRM	3–0	Kuching City
Nabil 54'; Agba 69'; Amir 78'	Report

MBPJ Stadium, Petaling Jaya
Attendance: 955
Referee: Shukor Zulkiflee

Second leg

3 December 2023
20:15

Kuching City	1–1	PDRM
Shitembi 33'	Report	Agba 56'

Sarawak State Stadium, Kuching
Attendance: 2,000
Referee: Zamzaidi Katimin

PDRM won 4–1 on aggregate.

=== Winner ===
2023 MFL Challenge Cup

PDRM
1st title

== Statistics ==
=== Top goalscorers ===
Rank	Player	Club	Goals
1	(Nigeria) Uche Agba	PDRM	5
2	(Malaysia) Royizzat Daud	Kelantan United	3
2	(Liberia) Abu Kamara	Kuching City	3
4	(Malaysia) S. Sharvin	Kelantan United	2
4	(Brazil) Bruno Dybal	Kuching City	2
4	(Timor-Leste) Pedro Henrique	Kuching City	2
4	(Malaysia) Amir Saiful	PDRM	2
4	(Malaysia) Fakhrul Azim	PDRM	2
4	(Malaysia) Nabil Latpi	PDRM	2
4	(Lebanon) Soony Saad	Penang	2
11	19 players	6 clubs	1

== See also ==
- 2023 Piala Sumbangsih
- 2023 Malaysia FA Cup
- 2023 Malaysia Cup
- 2023 Malaysia Super League
- 2023 Malaysia M3 League
- 2023 Malaysia M4 League
- 2023 Malaysia M5 League
- 2023 MFL Cup
- 2023 Piala Presiden
- 2023 Piala Belia
- 2023 Piala Tun Sharifah Rodziah
