= Heberty =

Brazilian footballer (born 1988)

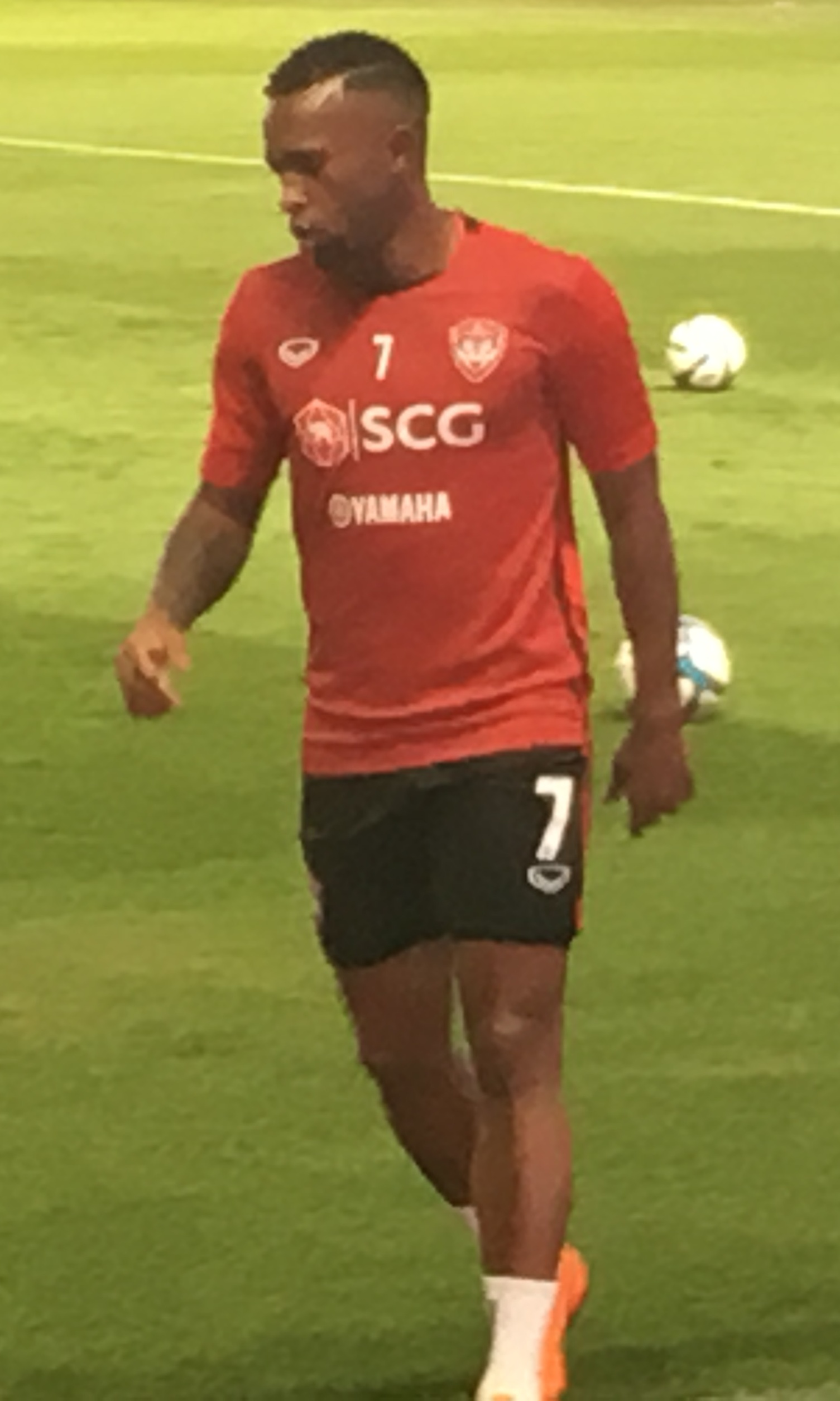
- Heberty warming up with Muangthong United in 2018

Personal information
- Full name: Heberty Fernandes de Andrade
- Date of birth: 29 August 1988 (age 38)
- Place of birth: São Paulo, Brazil
- Height: 1.72 m (5 ft 7 1/2 in)
- Position: Forward

Youth career
- Taboão da Serra

Senior career*
Years	Team	Apps	(Gls)
2008	Vasco da Gama	0	(0)
2008–2009	Recanatese	20	(5)
2009–2010	Juventus-SP	17	(3)
2011	São Caetano	16	(1)
2011	Paulista-SP	10	(2)
2012	Thespakusatsu Gunma	22	(5)
2012	→ Cerezo Osaka (loan)	13	(0)
2013	Vegalta Sendai	16	(1)
2014–2016	Ratchaburi	90	(65)
2016–2017	Al-Shabab	12	(2)
2017–2020	Muangthong United	80	(52)
2020	→ Port (loan)	9	(7)
2020–2023	Bangkok United	70	(35)
2023–2026	Johor Darul Ta'zim	34	(15)
- * Club domestic league appearances and goals as of 17 December 2025

Heberty Fernandes de Andrade (born August 29, 1988), simply known as Heberty, is a Brazilian former professional footballer who plays as a forward.

In May 2015, Heberty controversially obtained Timorese citizenship, making him eligible to play for Timor-Leste internationally but he did not make his international debut with them.

On 19 January 2017, the Asian Football Confederation declared 12 Brazilian men's footballers, including Heberty, ineligible to represent Timor-Leste. Following their nationality falsification, the country was banned from competing in international events.

Heberty is considered one of the top 5 players in Matchday 13 of the Thai League 1 in an article by FOX Sports Asia. He has made 249 appearances across four clubs in Thai League 1, the most for a foreign player in the league and also in the league top 10 all-time most appearances.

Heberty currently holds the record for being the all-time goal scorer in Thai League 1 history with 159 goals.

== Club career ==
=== Early career ===
Heberty started his career at Taboão da Serra before moving to Vasco da Gama in 2008. In July 2008, Heberty moved to Italian club Recanatese before moving back to Brazil to joined Juventus-SP in August 2009. After spending two seasons at the club, he moved to São Caetano in January 2011 before joining Paulista-SP in August the same year.

=== Thespakusatsu Gunma ===
In January 2012, Heberty moved to Japan to joined J2 League club Thespakusatsu Gunma. He scored a brace on his debut to secure the 3 points in a 3–2 win over Ōita Trinita on 4 March.

==== Cerezo Osaka (loan) ====
On 11 August 2012, Heberty was loaned out to J1 League club Cerezo Osaka mid-way throughout the 2012 season. He make his debut for the club on 11 August in a 2–2 draw against rivals Gamba Osaka.

=== Vegalta Sendai ===
In January 2013, Heberty joined J1 League club Vegalta Sendai. He make his debut for the club in a 3–2 lost over Kashima Antlers on 9 March. Heberty make his AFC Champions League debut on 12 March against Chinese side Jiangsu Sainty in a goalless draw. In the home fixture against the Kashima Antlers on 10 August, he scored his first goal for the club in a 2–1 win.

=== Ratchaburi ===
In January 2014, Heberty moved to Thailand club Ratchaburi in Thai League 1. He finished his first season in Thailand as the league top scorer award with 26 goals.

=== Al Shabab ===
On 7 July 2016, Heberty sign with Saudi Pro League club Al Shabab. He make his debut on 18 September in a 3–2 win over Al Ahli. Heberty scored his first goal for the club on 23 September in a 2–2 draw over Al Taawoun.

=== Muangthong United ===
On 2 March 2017, Heberty returned to Thailand and signed for Muangthong United. He scored on his debut in a 2–2 draw against Sukhothai on 16 June. On 20 September, Heberty scored his first hat-trick for the club in a 4–0 league win over Bangkok United. He then scored his second hat-trick of the season in the 2017 Thai FA Cup fixtures against Lampang which resulted in a 5–0 win. Heberty helped the club to win the 2017 Thai League Cup in his first season at the club.

During the 2018 AFC Champions League qualifying play-offs preliminary round 2 on 23 January 2018, Heberty scored a brace and assisted once in a 5–2 win over Malaysian side Johor Darul Ta'zim which send the team to the play-off round before eventually losing to Japanese club Kashiwa Reysol 3–0. In the 2018 season, Heberty recorded 30 goals and 15 assists in 41 appearances in all competition where he scored two hat-trick which was on 20 May 2018 in a 4–3 win over Sukhothai and 3 October 2018 in a 5–5 draw against Pattaya United. On 7 October, Heberty make his 100th appearance for the club in the club last league fixture against Bangkok United.

==== Port (loan) ====
On 10 December 2019, Heberty joined another Thailand club, Port on loan. He make his debut on 21 March 2020 in the 2020 AFC Champions League qualifying play-offs preliminary round 2 in a 1–0 lost against Philippines club Ceres-Negros. Heberty scored his first goal for the club by scoring a brace in a 4–1 win over Nakhon Ratchasima on 15 February. He returned to his main club after his loan spell expired on 30 November 2020.

=== Bangkok United ===
On 4 December 2020, Heberty joined Bangkok United on a free transfer. He make his debut on 26 December against his former club Muangthong United in a 2–2 draw. Heberty scored his first goal for the club in a 2–1 win over Ratchaburi on 13 February 2021.

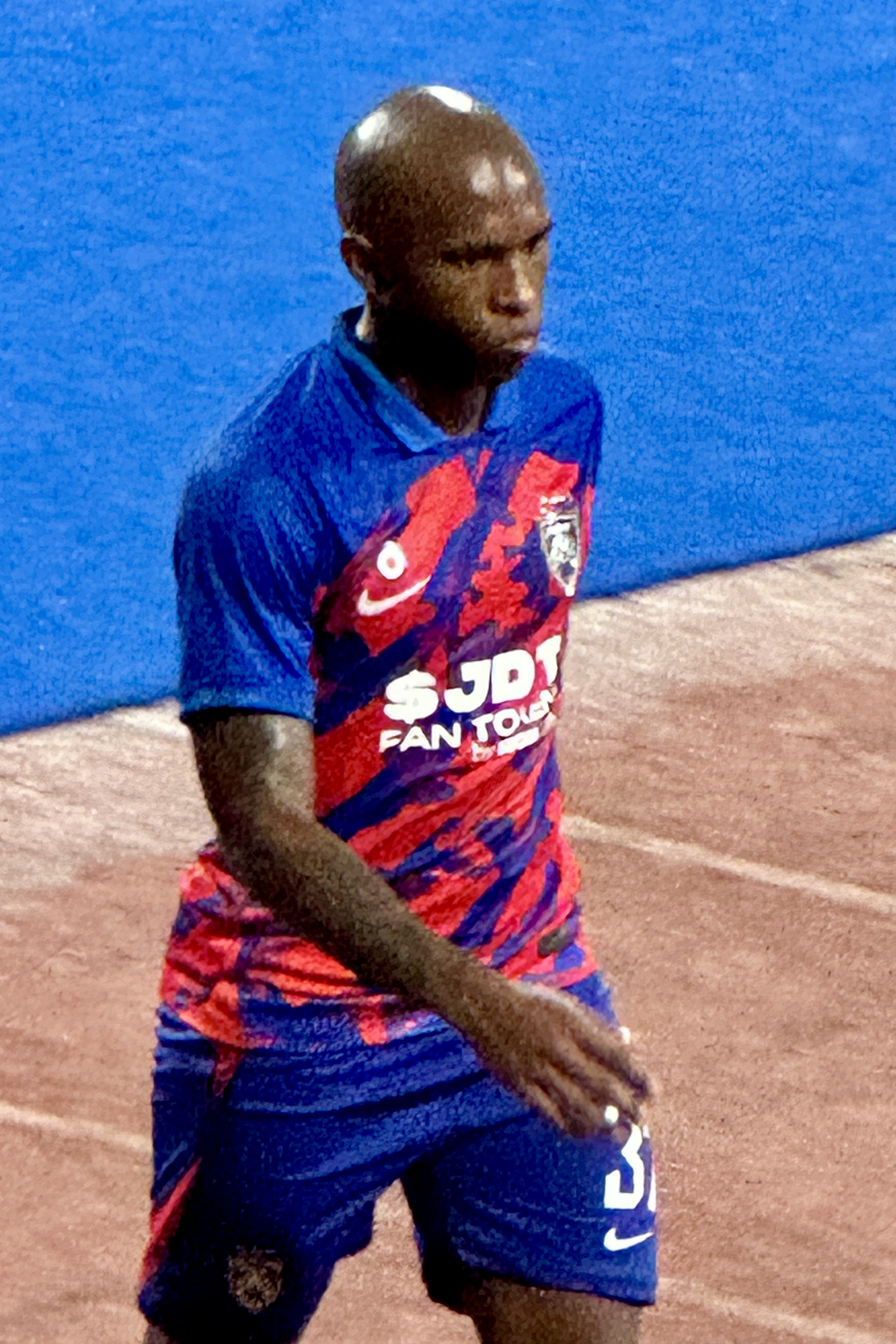
Heberty playing for Johor Darul Ta'zim in 2024

On 1 May 2022, Heberty scored his first hat-trick for the club in a 5–2 league win over Suphanburi.

=== Johor Darul Ta'zim ===
On 21 July 2023, Heberty moved to Malaysian club Johor Darul Ta'zim mid-way throughout the 2023 Malaysia Super League season. He scored on his debut in a 2–0 win over Selangor on 29 July. He went on to score in the next 3 consecutive league matches against Sabah, Perak and Kedah Darul Aman. On 7 November, Heberty helped his club to secured a 2–1 win in the AFC Champions League match against Korean club Ulsan Hyundai. In his first season, he won the domestic treble winning the league title, the 2023 Malaysia FA Cup and the 2023 Malaysia Cup.

Heberty however renewed his contract on 14 February 2024 with the club until the end of the 2024–25 season. On 22 June, he scored his first hat-trick with the club in a 3–0 win over Sri Pahang. During the round of 16 of the 2024–25 Malaysia Cup, Heberty scored a hat-trick in the first leg tie against Kuala Lumpur Rovers in a 3–0 win.

== Eligibility controversy ==
An inquiry held by the Prime Minister of Timor-Leste in 2016 heard that Heberty was one of seven Brazilian men's footballers to receive falsified baptism documents from Timor-Leste's Catholic Church, in order to make it appear he was eligible for Timorese nationality.

All seven players are based in Asia, but only one, Juninho, has played for Timor-Leste's controversial national team.

Heberty received his Timorese passport in 2015, despite having no known means of eligibility, such as a family connection, or residency.

== Club statistics ==
Updated as of 6 July 2024.

Club performance		League			Cup		League Cup		Continental		Total	
Club	Season	Division	Apps	Goals	Apps	Goals	Apps	Goals	Apps	Goals	Apps	Goals
Vasco da Gama	2008											
Recanatese	2009											
Juventus-SP	2010	Paulistão A3	17	3	0	0	–		–		17	3
São Caetano	2010											
Paulista-SP	2011											
Thespakusatsu Gunma	2012	J2 League	22	5	–		–		–		22	5
Cerezo Osaka	2012	J1 League	13	0	1	0	0	0	–		14	0
Vegalta Sendai	2013	J1 League	16	1	0	0	0	0	2	0	18	1
Ratchaburi	2014	Thai League 1	36	26					–		36	26
Ratchaburi	2015	Thai League 1	34	19	4	2			–		38	21
Ratchaburi	2016	Thai League 1	20	20	1	0	1	0	–		22	20
Ratchaburi	Total		90	65	5	2	1	0	0	0	96	67
Al-Shabab	2016-17	Saudi Pro League	12	4	2	1	–		–		14	5
Muangthong United	2017	Thai League 1	16	12	5	5	5	2	0	0	26	19
Muangthong United	2018	Thai League 1	34	26	3	2	2	0	2	2	41	30
Muangthong United	2019	Thai League 1	30	14	3	2	1	0	–		34	16
Muangthong United	Total		80	52	11	9	8	2	2	2	101	65
Port (loan)	2020–21	Thai League 1	9	7	0	0	–		–		9	7
Bangkok United	2020–21	Thai League 1	15	9	3	1	–		–		18	10
Bangkok United	2021–22	Thai League 1	29	15	2	1	1	1	–		32	17
Bangkok United	2022–23	Thai League 1	26	11	6	2	2	1	–		34	14
Bangkok United	Total		70	35	11	4	3	2	0	0	84	41
Johor Darul Ta'zim	2023	Malaysia Super League	8	6	4	4	–		6	1	18	11
Johor Darul Ta'zim	2024–25	Malaysia Super League	3	3	0	0	3	1	0	0	5	1
Career total			330	181	32	19	12	7	16	4	386	205

== Honours ==
=== Club ===
==== Muangthong United ====
- Thai League Cup: 2017
- Mekong Club Championship: 2017

==== Bangkok United ====
- Thai League 1 runners-up: 2022–23
- Thai FA Cup runners-up: 2022–23

==== Johor Darul Ta'zim ====
- Malaysia Super League: 2023, 2024–25
- Malaysia FA Cup: 2023, 2024
- Malaysia Cup: 2023, 2024–25
- Piala Sumbangsih: 2024,2025

=== Individual ===
- Thai Premier League Top score: 2014 (26 Goal)
- Thai League T1 Player of the month: August 2014, June 2018, July 2019, August 2022
