= Arif Aiman =

Malaysian footballer (born 2002)

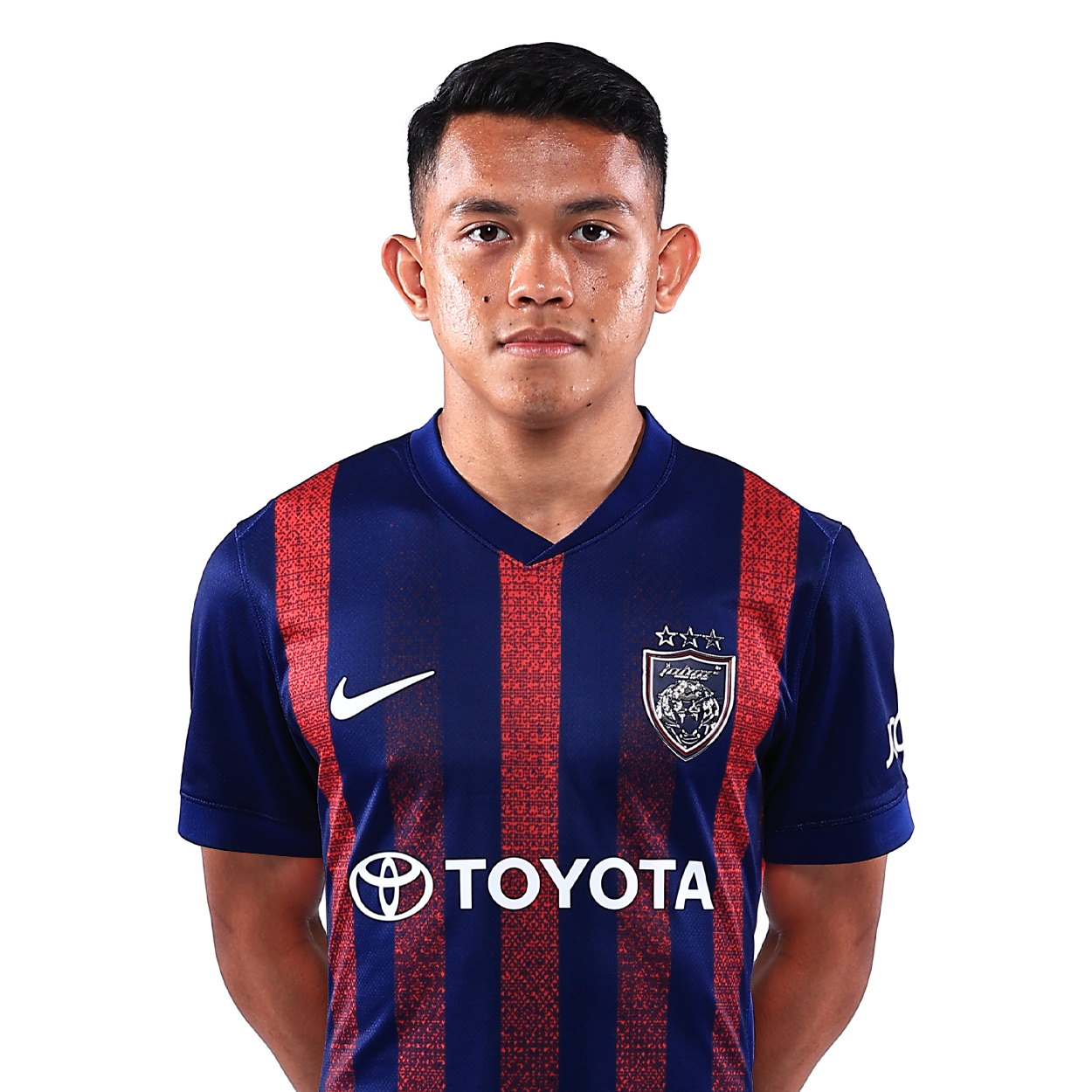
- Arif Aiman in 2025/26

Personal information
- Full name: Arif Aiman bin Mohd Hanapi
- Date of birth: 4 May 2002 (age 24)
- Place of birth: Kuantan, Pahang, Malaysia
- Height: 1.71 m (5 ft 7 in)
- Position: Winger

Team information
- Current team: Johor Darul Ta'zim
- Number: 10

Youth career
- 2014–2015: NFDP
- 2015–2017: Mokhtar Dahari Academy
- 2018–2020: Johor Darul Ta'zim III

Senior career*
Years	Team	Apps	(Gls)
2020	Johor Darul Ta'zim II	6	(0)
2020–	Johor Darul Ta'zim	103	(32)

International career^{‡}
2021–	Malaysia	43	(10)
Medal record
Men's football
Representing Malaysia
FIFA ASEAN Cup
Third place	2026
Merdeka Tournament
Winner	2024
Runner-up	2023
King's Cup
Runner-up	2022
- * Club domestic league appearances and goals as of 11 September 2026 ‡ National team caps and goals as of 6 October 2026

Arif Aiman bin Mohd Hanapi (born 4 May 2002) is a Malaysian professional footballer who plays as a winger for Malaysia Super League club Johor Darul Ta'zim and the Malaysia national team.

Arif currently holds the record for winning the Malaysia Super League 'Most Valuable Player' award for fourth consecutive season.

== Youth career ==
Arif's talent was discovered during the Mykids programme in 2011/12, and he later joined the squad that won IberCup Costa Del Sol in 2015. He then decided to leave Mokhtar Dahari National Football Academy at the end of 2018 to join JDT Academy in order to increase his playing opportunities. After playing for JDT in the Youth and President's Cups, Arif Aiman caught the attention of Malaysia U19 squad coach, Bojan Hodak, in early 2019.

Arif is a product of the National Football Development Programme of Malaysia (NFDP) from 2015 to 2017 and then Johor Darul Ta'zim Academy. He played in all levels of the academy including JDT IV, JDT III, JDT II until he became a regular for the first team.

Arif began his senior club with Johor Darul Ta'zim after playing for the youth club few years back. In 2021, at age 19, he won the Most Valuable Player (MVP) in the 2021 National Football Awards ceremony and created the nation's history as the youngest player ever chosen as MVP, surpassing teammate Safawi Rasid, who was 21 when he was selected as MVP in 2018. He was also named Best Striker and Most Promising Player in that year's awards.

== Club career ==
=== Johor Darul Ta'zim ===
Arif made his senior debut with Johor Darul Ta'zim II on 29 February 2020 in the 2020 Malaysia Premier League. He played 73 minutes in a 3–1 away win against Negeri Sembilan. On 14 March 2020, he made his Johor Darul Ta'zim first team debut against Felda United in the 2020 Malaysia Super League. He scored his first goal for the club against Kuching City in a 1–0 win in the Round of 16 of the 2020 Malaysia Cup which see them through to the quarter-finals. Arif made his first appearance in the 2021 season against UiTM after his teammate Safawi Rasid was subbed off because of a knee injury. He also scored in that match. Arif was named in the 25 best ASEAN wonderkids in football. On 22 June 2021, he made his debut in 2021 AFC Champions League, which ended in a 0–1 loss against Japanese club Nagoya Grampus.

==== Sending JDT to their first ever knockout stage of the AFC Champions League ====
On 30 April 2022, as Johor desperately needing a win to qualify for the round of 16 in the 2022 AFC Champions League group stage, he crossed the ball during the last kick of the match, which resulted Ulsan Hyundai player, Park Yong-woo to accidentally scored an own goal. Johor won the game with a score of 2–1 and qualified to the knockout stage as group leader. On 5 August 2022, Arif scored his first senior hat-trick for JDT during the 2022 Malaysia FA Cup semi-finals match against Penang. On 28 November 2022, he scored a goal in a friendly match against Borussia Dortmund in Johor's last match of in 2022.

On 2 February 2023, Arif started off his pre-season well in Dubai in the match against Russian club, Lokomotiv Moscow in which he ran past behind the goalkeeper and scored the only goal in the game. On 24 February 2023, he won the 2023 Malaysia Charity Shield for the third time in his career after a 2–0 over Terengganu. On 26 June 2023, he scored a first half hat-trick in the semi-finals of the 2023 Malaysia FA Cup against Selangor. It was also his back to back hat-trick for club and country. During the 2023–24 AFC Champions League group stage match against Thailand club BG Pathum United on 3 October 2023, after the opponent, Victor Cardozo scored from the penalty spot, Arif scored 10 seconds after the game was restarted from kick-off after receiving a long ball pass from captain Jordi Amat. Arif then scored a brace in the 78th minute which secured a 4–2 win at the BG Stadium. On 7 November 2023, Arif assisted Akhyar Rashid who then scored the winner against Korean giants Ulsan Hyundai in a 2–1 home win. During the last AFC Champions League fixture against BG Pathum United at home, Arif recorded a goal and an assist in a 4–1 win over the Thailand club.

On 24 August 2024, Arif scored a goal during the 2024 Malaysia FA Cup final in a 6–1 thrashing win over Selangor. During the inaugural 2024–25 AFC Champions League Elite against Chinese club Shanghai Port at the Pudong Football Stadium on 18 September 2024, Arif scored the opener after dribbling past three players before slotting the ball behind Yan Junling with his weak foot from outside the box, making him the first Malaysian ever scoring goal in AFC Champions League Elite. He then scored a brace in the 56th minute with his weak foot again to bring the score to 2–1 but unfortunately, both team settled the match at 2–2. In the next AFC Champions League Elite match at home against Chinese club Shanghai Shenghua on 1 October, Arif scored with his weak foot in the 10th minute to open up the account in the match, Johor Darul Ta'zim ended up victorius in a 3–0 win. On 8 December during a league match against Kuala Lumpur City, Arif scored a hat-trick with two of his goal scoring with a 30-yard screamer including a penalty in which JDT won 3–0. In April 2025, Arif made history for winning the Malaysia Super League 'Most Valuable Player' award for fourth consecutive season surpassing Norshahrul Idlan Talaha who has three awards.

== International career ==
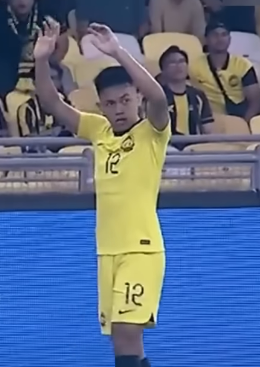
Arif Aiman with Malaysia national team in November 2023

Arif made his first appearance for the Malaysia national team against Bahrain on 29 May 2021. His first competitive match with Malaysia was against Vietnam in the 2022 FIFA World Cup qualifier as a substitution. He made his appearance in the 61st minute but the team eventually ended up losing 1–2. Arif was then included in the 2020 AFF Championship squad where he recorded two assists against Laos at the Bishan Stadium in a 4–0 win.

Arif converted a penalty kick against Solomon Islands in an international friendly match on 14 June 2023, which was his first international goal after 16 appearances with the national team. On 20 June 2023, he scored four goals in a 10–0 against Papua New Guinea, which made him the seventh Malaysian player to score more than three goals in one international match. On 16 November 2023 in a 2026 FIFA World Cup qualifiers match against Kyrgyzstan, as Malaysia was losing 3–1, Arif then recorded a hat-trick of assist which then see Malaysia gain the 3 points in a 4–3 comeback win.

During the 2023 AFC Asian Cup group stage fixture against South Korea on 25 January 2024, Arif scored from the penalty spot, giving Malaysia a 2–1 lead against the Asian giants.

== Career statistics ==
=== Club ===
As of match played 11 January 2025

Club	Season	League			Malaysia FA Cup		Malaysia Cup		Continental		Other		Total	
Club	Season	Division	Apps	Goals	Apps	Goals	Apps	Goals	Apps	Goals	Apps	Goals	Apps	Goals
Johor Darul Ta'zim II	2020	Malaysia Premier League	6	0	—		—		—		—		6	0
Johor Darul Ta'zim	2020	Malaysia Super League	2	0	—		1	1	—		—		3	1
Johor Darul Ta'zim	2021	Malaysia Super League	21	2	—		10	1	5 (Note: Appearances in AFC Champions League)	0	—		36	3
Johor Darul Ta'zim	2022	Malaysia Super League	21	3	4	4	5	1	7	0	1	0	38	8
Johor Darul Ta'zim	2023	Malaysia Super League	24	12	4	4	6	5	6	3	1 (Note: Appearance in Piala Sumbangsih)	0	41	24
Johor Darul Ta'zim	2024–25	Malaysia Super League	14	7	6	2	3	3	6 (Note: Appearance in AFC Champions League Elite)	4	—		29	16
Johor Darul Ta'zim	Total		88	24	14	10	25	11	24	7	2	0	153	52
Career total			88	24	14	10	25	11	24	7	2	0	153	52

=== International ===
As of matches played 6 October 2026.

Appearances and goals by national team and year
National team	Year	Apps	Goals
Malaysia	2021	7	0
Malaysia	2022	8	0
Malaysia	2023	8	6
Malaysia	2024	9	1
Malaysia	2025	7	1
Malaysia	2026	4	2
Total		43	10

International goals

No.	Date	Venue	Opponent	Score	Result	Competition
1.	14 June 2023	Sultan Mizan Zainal Abidin Stadium, Terengganu, Malaysia	Solomon Islands	2–1	4–1	Friendly match
2.	20 June 2023	Sultan Mizan Zainal Abidin Stadium, Terengganu, Malaysia	Papua New Guinea	3–0	10–0	Friendly
3.	20 June 2023	Sultan Mizan Zainal Abidin Stadium, Terengganu, Malaysia	Papua New Guinea	4–0	10–0	Friendly
4.	20 June 2023	Sultan Mizan Zainal Abidin Stadium, Terengganu, Malaysia	Papua New Guinea	9–0	10–0	Friendly
5.	20 June 2023	Sultan Mizan Zainal Abidin Stadium, Terengganu, Malaysia	Papua New Guinea	10–0	10–0	Friendly
6.	13 October 2023	Bukit Jalil National Stadium, Kuala Lumpur, Malaysia	India	2–1	4–2	2023 Merdeka Tournament
7.	25 January 2024	Al Janoub Stadium, Al Wakrah, Qatar	South Korea	2–1	3–3	2023 AFC Asian Cup
8.	9 October 2025	New Laos National Stadium, Vientiane, Laos	Laos	1–0	3–0	2027 AFC Asian Cup qualification
9.	25 September 2026	Gelora Bung Karno Stadium, Jakarta, Indonesia	Bangladesh	1–0	3–0	2026 FIFA ASEAN Cup
10.	25 September 2026	Gelora Bung Karno Stadium, Jakarta, Indonesia	Bangladesh	2–0	3–0	2026 FIFA ASEAN Cup

== Honours ==
=== Club ===
Johor Darul Ta'zim

- Malaysia Super League: 2021, 2022, 2023, 2024–25, 2025–26
- Malaysia FA Cup: 2022, 2023, 2024
- Malaysia Cup: 2022, 2023, 2024–25
- Piala Sumbangsih: 2021, 2022, 2023, 2024, 2025

=== International ===
Malaysia

- Pestabola Merdeka: 2024; runner-up: 2023
- King's Cup runner-up: 2022
- FIFA ASEAN Cup third place: 2026

=== Individual ===
- FAM Football Awards – Most Valuable Player: 2021, 2022, 2023, 2024–25
- FAM Football Awards – Best Striker: 2021, 2022, 2023
- FAM Football Awards – Best Midfielder: 2024–25
- FAM Football Awards – Best Young Player: 2021, 2022, 2023, 2024
- Malaysia Super League Team of the Season: 2021, 2022, 2023, 2024–25
- Malaysia FA Cup Top Scorer: 2023
