= Tomislav Steinbrückner =

Croatian-German footballer and coach

Personal information
- Full name: Tomislav Steinbrückner
- Date of birth: 17 October 1966 (age 60)
- Place of birth: Petrijevci, SR Croatia, SFR Yugoslavia
- Position: Midfielder

Youth career
- Osijek

Senior career*
Years	Team	Apps	(Gls)
1984–1992	Osijek	114	(11)
1993–1994	Belišće	21	(1)
1995–1996	Marsonia	26	(2)
1997–1998	Istra	25	(2)
1998–1999	Cibalia	24	(5)
1999	SAFFC		

Managerial career
- 2008–2010: Osijek
- 2012–2013: Novigrad
- 2013: Osijek
- 2014: Belišće
- 2015: T-Team
- 2020–2021: BSK Bijelo Brdo
- 2023–2024: Terengganu
- 2025: Đông Á Thanh Hóa
- * Club domestic league appearances and goals

Tomislav Steinbrückner (born 17 October 1966) is a Croatian-German football manager and former player who was recently the manager for Dong A Thanh Hoa.

== Club career ==
As a football player, Steinbrückner played for several Croatian clubs (Osijek, Marsonia, Belišće, Uljanik, Istra, and Cibalia) before ending his football career in Singapore with Singapore Armed Forces FC.

== Managerial career ==
As head coach, he held the head coach job at Osijek for two stints. He also coached NK Novigrad and had a short stint with NK Belišće. From December 2014 to November 2015, Steinbrückner was the head coach of Malaysian side T-Team. After a few seasons, he went back to Croatia to coach the Osijek Reserves and took the helm at Bijelo Brdo, where he resigned in December 2021. He was announced as the new head coach for Terengganu FC on 1 December 2022 for the 2023 season. On October 1, 2024 Terengganu F.C. and Tomi held a discussion and has reached mutual agreement for the termination of his contract as the Head Coach of the Terengganu FC main team for this season. He place will taken by his assistant Badrul Afzan as caretaker coach. In March 2025, he is head coach of Dong A Thanh Hoa now playing in V.League 1.

== Managerial statistics ==
As of match played 22 June 2025

Managerial record by team and tenure
Team	Nat	From	To	Record				
Team	Nat	From	To	G	W	D	L	Win%
NK Osijek	(Croatia)	26 September 2008	16 August 2010	59	21	19	19	35.59
NK Osijek	(Croatia)	4 June 2013	18 August 2013	6	1	0	5	16.67
T-Team	(Malaysia)	1 January 2015	30 November 2015	30	15	6	9	50.00
Bijelo Brdo	(Croatia)	26 December 2019	2 December 2021	53	24	14	15	45.28
Terengganu	(Malaysia)	1 December 2022	1 October 2024	59	29	17	13	49.15
Đông Á Thanh Hóa	(Vietnam)	24 March 2025	10 July 2025	10	1	2	7	10.00
Career Total				217	91	58	68	41.94

== Honours ==
=== Manager ===
Terengganu

- Malaysia Charity Shield runner-up: 2023
- Malaysia Cup runner-up: 2023
