= Bérgson =

Brazilian footballer (born 1991)

Bérgson da Silva
Personal information
- Full name: Bérgson Gustavo Silveira da Silva
- Date of birth: 9 February 1991 (age 35)
- Place of birth: Alegrete, Brazil
- Height: 1.80 m (5 ft 11 in)
- Position: Striker

Team information
- Current team: Johor Darul Ta'zim
- Number: 9

Youth career
- 2004–2006: Internacional
- 2006–2010: Grêmio

Senior career*
Years	Team	Apps	(Gls)
2010–2016	Gremio	9	(0)
2011	→ Suwon Samsung Bluewings (loan)	11	(1)
2011	→ Vila Nova (loan)	6	(0)
2012	→ Ypiranga (loan)	4	(2)
2012	→ Braga B (loan)	2	(0)
2013	→ Juventude (loan)	22	(6)
2013	→ Portuguesa (loan)	15	(2)
2014	→ Chapecoense (loan)	19	(3)
2015	→ Busan IPark (loan)	8	(0)
2015–2017	Náutico	49	(13)
2017	Paysandu	35	(17)
2018–2019	Athletico Paranaense	42	(11)
2019–2020	Ceará	39	(6)
2020–2021	Fortaleza	14	(3)
2021–	Johor Darul Ta'zim	110	(137)

International career^{‡}
2010	Brazil U20	2	(0)
2026–	Malaysia	4	(4)
Medal record
Men's football
Representing Malaysia
FIFA ASEAN Cup
Third place	2026 Indonesia	Team
- * Club domestic league appearances and goals as of 11 September 2026 ‡ National team caps and goals as of 5 October 2026

Bérgson Gustavo Silveira da Silva (born 9 February 1991), simply known as Bérgson, is a professional footballer who plays as a striker for Malaysia Super League club Johor Darul Ta'zim. Born in Brazil, he represents the Malaysia national team.

During his time at Athletico Paranaense, he won the 2018 Copa Sudamericana. Bergson is also currently the all-time top scorer for Johor Darul Ta'zim with 196 goals and became the first player to score 100 goals for the club where he scored a total of 18 hat-tricks during his time with the Malaysian club.

== Club career ==
=== Grêmio ===
In 2006, at the age of 15, Bergson joined the Grêmio Youth Academy from Internacional. Here, Bérgson found great success winning the 2008 Taça Belo Horizonte de Juniores as well as two consecutive Campeonato Brasileiro Sub-20 titles in 2008 and 2009, finishing as the top goalscorer in the latter.

Bergson made his professional debut at the club in 2009. In 2010, Bérgson scored his first professional goal in a 3–2 loss to Avai in the Copa do Brasil. Bergson struggled to obtain first-team opportunities due to the competition of several proven strikers at the club at the time such as Jonas, Leandro and William.

In 2010, Bergson's form came to the attention of the Brazil U20 set up being called up for two games.

==== Suwon Samsung Bluewings (loan) ====
Despite interest from Sweden and Qatari side Al Wasl, on 1 January 2011 Bergson moved to Asia to join South Korean giants, Suwon Samsung Bluewings on loan. Despite a promising preseason consisting of 3 goals in three games, Bergson failed to get to find consistent game time as well as suffering a groin injury leaving him out of action for 40 days. Bergson scored his first and only goal for the side, opening the scoring showing off his skillful dribbling shortly after narrowly missing a scoring attempt from the halfway line in a 3–1 Korean FA Cup win against Pochean . On 30 June 2011, after only 1 league start for the side, Bergson and Suwon Bluewings mutually terminated their loan.

==== Vila Nova (loan) ====
After returning to his parent club, Bergson received loan interest from São Caetano and Paraná Clube. On 1 July 2011, upon the request of then manager Hélio dos Anjos to improve the club's attack, Serie B side Vila Nova signed Bergson on a short-term loan until the end of the season. Former Suwon Bluewings teammate Wando would also follow Bergson to Vila Nova on a permanent deal.

==== Ypiranga (loan) ====
On 1 February 2012, Bergson joined Campeonato Gaúcho side Ypiranga on loan. Bergson scored 5 minutes into his club debut in a 1–1 draw against Cerâmica. Bergson would suffer a thigh injury initially ruling him out of playing for 30 days however rushing the recovery of the injury lead to him injuring his thigh in the first game back from injury causing him to only make one league appearance for the club before his loan ended.

==== Braga B (loan) ====
On 1 July 2012, Bergson joined the reserve team of Braga of the Portuguese side, Braga B on a short-term loan until the end of the Portuguese season. The deal included an option to buy however Braga never triggered the clause.

==== Juventude (loan) ====
Bergson returned from Europe and would eventually be sent back out on loan. On 1 January 2013, Bergson agreed to join Serie D team Juventude on loan. Bergson performed well for the side and scored 6 times in the league finally returning to consistent football with 22 league appearances.

==== Portuguesa (loan) ====
Due to a clause in Bergson loan agreement with Juventude, he would be allowed terminate his loan if a Brasileiro Série A team were to make an offer. After Portuguesa offered four times the wages Bergson was receiving at the time, Juventude were unable to retain his services and on 1 August 2013, he joined Série A club Portuguesa on loan. After not making an appearance in the league for over two seasons, Bergson scored his first Série A goal, a header, in a 4–2 win against Bahia on 31 August.

==== Chapecoense (loan) ====
Bergson's form with Portuguesa saw him continue to attract interest from top division Brazilian clubs leading him to be officially unveiled as a Chapacoense player on 1 January 2014, once again on loan. Bergson would establish himself as a first team player initially after 3 goals in 11 appearances in the 2014 Campeonato Catarinense.

==== Busan IPark (loan) ====
On 6 January 2015, Bergson joined South Korean side Busan IPark on loan. There he would reunite with his former Suwon Bluewings coach Yoon Sung-hyo, who would eventually resign from the club shortly after Bergson's departure. Bergson made his debut for the club on 7 March in a 1–0 win over Daejeon Hana Citizen.

=== Náutico ===
In July 2015, Bergson joined Náutico on loan. He scored his first goal for the club with a brace in a 3–0 win over ABC on 26 September. Halfway throughout the season, on 28 January 2016, Náutico decided to sign Bergson on a permanent transfer.

=== Paysandu ===
On 19 January 2017, Bérgson joined Campeonato Brasileiro Série B club, Paysandu on a free transfer. On 18 November 2017, he scored his first hat-trick for the club in a league match against Santa Cruz. Bérgson ended the season scoring 28 goals in 47 appearances.

=== Athletico Paranaense ===
On 1 January 2018, Bergson joined Athletico Paranaense on a free transfer. He made his debut for the club in a 3–1 loss to Palmeiras on 6 May. Bergson then scored his first goal for the club with a brace and an assist in a 4–0 win over Sport Recife on 15 October which he won the 'Man of the Match' award. During the 2018 Copa do Brasil second round tie against Tubarão on 21 February, he scored the first goal whereby the match ended in a 5–4 win which sent his team to third round.

On 13 December, Bergson won the 2018 Copa Sudamericana by scoring the third penalty in the shootout which saw his team win 4–3 on penalties against Colombian club Atlético Junior. He won the trophy alongside Bruno Guimarães, Renan Lodi and Rony.

=== Ceará ===
On 26 April 2019, Bergson joined Ceará on a free transfer. He scored his first goal for the club by scoring the only goal in the match to get his team the win against Avaí on 13 October.

=== Fortaleza ===
On 15 October 2020, Bergson joined Fortaleza on a free transfer. He scored his first goal for the club against his former club Athletico Paranaense in a 2–1 loss on 7 November.

=== Johor Darul Ta'zim ===
On 2 March 2021, Bergson joined Malaysian side Johor Darul Ta'zim initially on loan. On 13 March 2021, Bergson scored his first goal for Johor Darul Ta'zim in an away league match against UiTM in which JDT won the match 4–0. On 19 May 2021, after a successful spell of 11 goals, he signed with the club on a permanent deal.

On 31 July 2021, Bergson scored his first hat-trick for the club in a home league match against Perak where JDT won 5–0. On 27 August 2021, he got his 2nd hat-trick for the club in a home league match against Sri Pahang where Johor won 4–0. He went on to score 23 league goals for the club, which is also the club record in a single season.

==== 2022 season ====
On 15 April 2022, he become the first JDT player to ever score an AFC Champions League hat-trick against Guangzhou in a 5–0 home victory.

On 12 October 2022, Bergson become the new JDT all-time top scorer after his double against Kedah Darul Aman took his total tally to 67 goals in all competitions for the club. The previous record was 66 goals by Gonzalo Cabrera. Bergson also broke the Malaysia Super League record for the most goals in a league season with 29 goals. On 11 November 2022, he score his 4th hat-trick for the club in a 2022 Malaysia Cup quarter-final match against Kelantan where Johor Darul Ta'zim won 5–0 (8–0 aggregate) to qualified for the semi-final. He helped his club to win the quadruple with an undefeated domestic season becoming the first in the club's history.

Bergson was listed among 2022's top five goal scorers in the world. Having scored 46 goals in 36 matches in 2022, he was named alongside Kylian Mbappé, Erling Haaland, Germán Cano and Robert Lewandowski as players with the most goals in 2022. Also, Sky Sport Italy named Bergson as the goalscorer with the best goal ratio on an average of 1.27 goals per game, which no other player managed to emulate in 2022.

==== 2023 season ====
Bergson started off the 2023 season scoring a goal and an assist to win the 2023 Malaysia Charity Shield. On 13 May 2023, he scored his first hat-trick of the season in a league match against Kelantan United. On 9 August 2023, Bergson scored his 2nd hat-trick of the season in a league match against Sabah at the Likas Stadium. In the second league of the 2023 Malaysia Cup quarter-finals fixtures against Negeri Sembilan on 23 September 2023, Bergson scored twice to take his goal tally to 101 goals for the club in all competitions, thus becoming the first and only player thus far to score 100 goals for JDT.

==== 2024–25 season ====
On 18 May 2024, Bergson scored a brace in the club first league match of the season in a 3–1 home win over Negeri Sembilan.

On 26 July, Bergson scored his first hat-trick of the season in a 4–0 league win over Terengganu. He then scored his second hat-trick of the season on 8 August in a league match against Kedah Darul Aman in a 6–0 win. On 22 September, Bergson scored his third hat-trick of the season bringing his league goal tally to 13 in a 6–1 home win against Kelantan Darul Naim. He then scored his first 2024–25 AFC Champions League Elite goal against Korean club Ulsan HD in a 3–0 win on 5 November. On 10 November, Bergson scored his fourth hat-trick of the season in a 5–0 win over Perak. He then scored his fifth hat-trick on 29 March 2025 in the away fixtures against Kedah Darul Aman in a 6–1 win. In the next league match against Kelantan Darul Naim, Bergson scored five goals in 29 minutes in the first half of the match. The club went on to thrashed Kelantan Darul Naim 9–0 where Bergson became the first player in the league history to score more than 30 goals in a single season where Bergson scored a historic record of 32 goals in a season.

==== 2025–26 season ====
On 12 August 2025, Bergson scored an acrobatic goal in the stoppage time to secure a 5–3 home win over Negeri Sembilan. On 21 September, he scored a hat-trick in an 8–0 thrashing win over Sabah. In the next match in the 2025–26 ASEAN Club Championship against Thailand club Bangkok United on 25 September, Bergson scored a back-to-back hat-trick helping his team to a 4–0 win. He then scored his third hat-trick of the season by scoring 4 fours in a single match against Bruinean club DPMM in a 10–0 thrashing league win on 25 October. During the final league match of the season on 10 May 2026, Bergson scored 6 goals in a single match where the match ended in a 14–1 thrashing win against Kelantan TRW. The match also resulted in the Malaysia Super League as the all-time highest win in the league history. Bergson finished the season with 42 goals in 47 matches across all competition.

==== 2026–27 season ====
On 29 August 2026, Bergson scored a hat-trick in a 7–0 thrashing league win over Star City.

== International career ==
=== Youth ===
Bergson played with the Brazil U20 in 2010, making two appearances.

In 2024, images circulated online showing that Bergson played alongside Oscar in 2010 with the Brazil U20 when both of them met during the 2024–25 AFC Champions League Elite fixtures between Johor Darul Ta'zim and Shanghai Port.

=== Senior ===
On 13 September 2026, Bergson, along with fellow Johor Darul Ta'zim midfielder Brad Tapp, was cleared by FIFA to represent Malaysia in the upcoming 2026 FIFA ASEAN Cup as a naturalized player after living in the country for more than five years. On 25 September 2026, he scored on his debut in a 3–0 win over Bangladesh. On 1 October, Bergson scored a hat-trick in the Causeway Derby against rivals Singapore in a 6–0 thrashing victory.

== Style of play ==
Bergson is known for his ball striking from volleys and for scoring from bicycle kicks, feints, and long-distance strikes. Although naturally right-footed, he is capable of scoring with both feet and has been noted for his free-kick and penalty taking.

== Career statistics ==
=== Club ===
As of match played 11 September 2026.

Appearances and goals by club, season and competition
Club	Season	League			State League		Cup		Continental		Other		Total	
Club	Season	Division	Apps	Goals	Apps	Goals	Apps	Goals	Apps	Goals	Apps	Goals	Apps	Goals
Grêmio	2009	Série A	1	0	0	0	—		0 (Note: Appearance(s) in Copa Libertadores)	0	—		1	0
Grêmio	2010	Série A	4	0	6	0	2	0	0 (Note: Appearance(s) in Copa Sudamericana)	0	—		8	0
Grêmio	2011	Série A	0	0	4	0	0	0	0	0	—		0	0
Grêmio	Total		5	0	10	0	2	0	—		—		9	0
Suwon Bluewings (loan)	2011	K League	7	0	—		1	0	2 (Note: Appearance(s) in AFC Champions League/AFC Champions League Elite)	0	1 (Note: Appearance(s) in K-League Cup)	0	11	0
Vila Nova (loan)	2011	Série B	6	0	—		—		—		—		6	0
Ypiranga (loan)	2012	Série D	0	0	4	2	—		—		—		4	2
Braga B (loan)	2012–13	Segunda Liga	2	0	—		—		—		—		2	0
Juventude (loan)	2013	Série D	7	2	15	4	—		—		—		22	6
Portuguesa (loan)	2013	Série A	15	2	—		—		1	0	—		15	2
Chapecoense (loan)	2014	Série A	7	0	11	3	1	0	—		—		19	3
Busan IPark (loan)	2015	K League Classic	7	0	—		1	0	—		—		8	0
Náutico	2015	Série B	17	4	—		1	0	—		—		18	4
Náutico	2016	Série B	28	7	3	2	—		—		—		31	9
Náutico	Total		45	11	3	2	1	0	—		—		49	13
Paysandu	2017	Série B	28	16	—		2	0	—		5 (Note: Appearance(s) in Copa Verde)	1	35	17
Paysandu	Total		28	16	—		2	0	—		—		35	17
Athletico Paranaense	2018	Série A	16	3	—		5	2	6	0	—		27	5
Athletico Paranaense	2019	Série A	0	0	15	6	0	0	0	0	—		15	6
Athletico Paranaense	Total		16	3	15	6	5	2	6	0	—		42	11
Ceará	2019	Série A	22	3	—		—		—		—		22	3
Ceará	2020	Série A	5	0	7	1	5	2	—		—		17	3
Ceará	Total		27	3	7	1	5	2	—		—		39	6
Fortaleza	2021	Série A	14	3	0	0	—		—		—		14	3
Fortaleza	Total		14	3	0	0	—		—		—		14	3
Johor Darul Ta'zim	2021	Malaysia Super League	20	23	8 (Note: Appearance(s) in Malaysia Cup)	7	—		5	0			33	30
Johor Darul Ta'zim	2022	Malaysia Super League	19	29	6	7	4	4	6	6	1	0	36	46
Johor Darul Ta'zim	2023	Malaysia Super League	22	19	4	6	2	2	6	4	1	1	35	32
Johor Darul Ta'zim	2024–25	Malaysia Super League	22	32	6	7	5	3	10	2	0	0	43	43
Johor Darul Ta'zim	2025–26	Malaysia Super League	22	27	5	3	4	4	11	1	5	7	47	42
Johor Darul Ta'zim	2026–27	Malaysia Super League	5	6	0	0	1	1	1	0	0	0	7	7
Johor Darul Ta'zim	Total		110	136	29	30	16	14	39	13	7	8	200	199
Career total			296	176	94	48	35	18	48	13	13	8	486	263

=== International ===
As of 5 October 2026

Appearances and goals by national team and year
National team	Year	Apps	Goals
Malaysia	2026	4	4
Total		4	4

International goals

No.	Date	Venue	Opponent	Score	Result	Competition
1.	25 September 2026	Gelora Bung Karno Stadium, Jakarta, Indonesia	Bangladesh	3–0	3–0	2026 FIFA ASEAN Cup
2.	1 October 2026	Si Jalak Harupat Stadium, Bandung, Indonesia	Singapore	1–0	6–0	2026 FIFA ASEAN Cup
3.	1 October 2026	Si Jalak Harupat Stadium, Bandung, Indonesia	Singapore	3–0	6–0	2026 FIFA ASEAN Cup
4.	1 October 2026	Si Jalak Harupat Stadium, Bandung, Indonesia	Singapore	6–0	6–0	2026 FIFA ASEAN Cup

== Honours ==
=== Club ===
==== Grêmio ====
- Campeonato Gaúcho: 2010

==== Paysandu ====
- Campeonato Paraense: 2017

Athletico Paranaense

- Copa Sudamericana: 2018
- Campeonato Paranaense: 2019

Ceará

- Copa do Nordeste: 2020

==== Johor Darul Ta'zim ====
- Malaysia Super League: 2021, 2022, 2023, 2024–25, 2025–26
- Malaysia FA Cup: 2022, 2023, 2024
- Malaysia Cup: 2022, 2023, 2024–25
- Piala Sumbangsih: 2022, 2023, 2024, 2025

=== International ===
==== Malaysia ====
- FIFA ASEAN Cup third place: 2026

=== Individual ===
- Malaysia Super League Top Scorer: 2022, 2024–25, 2025–26
- Malaysia Super League Team of the Season: 2021, 2022, 2023, 2024–25
- FAM Football Awards – Best Foreign Player: 2022, 2023, 2024–25
- Malaysia Cup Top Scorer: 2022, 2023, 2024–25
- AFC Champions League The Best XI Fans' Choice: 2022
- IFFHS CONMEBOL Men's Best Goal Scorer: 2022
- IFFHS All Domestic Competitions Scoring Streak: 2022
- IFFHS 2nd Men's World Best Serial League Goal Scorer: 2022
- ASEAN Club Championship: Top Scorer 2025–26
- ASEAN Club Championship: Allstar XI 2025–26
