= 2023 Malaysia Cup =

Piala Malaysia 2023

Tournament details
- Country: Malaysia
- Dates: 3 August – 8 December 2023
- Teams: 16

Final positions
- Champions: Johor Darul Ta'zim (4th title)
- Runners-up: Terengganu

Tournament statistics
- Matches played: 29
- Goals scored: 106 (3.66 per match)
- Top goal scorer(s): (11 goals); Bergson

The 2023 Malaysia Cup (Malay: Piala Malaysia 2023), officially known as the TM Piala Malaysia 2023 for sponsorship reasons, was the 97th edition of Malaysia Cup tournament organised by the Football Association of Malaysia (FAM) and the Malaysian Football League (MFL).

Johor Darul Ta'zim were the defending champions. They defended the title, beating Terengganu 3–1 in the final.

== Format ==
In the competition, the top 14 teams from the 2023 Malaysia Super League were joined by the top two teams from the 2023 Malaysia M3 League. For the same repeat last season, the group stage was not played. The competition was played from 3 August until 8 December 2023, with 16 teams in the knockout stage which began in the round of 16, followed by quarter-finals, semi-finals and the final. This stage was played in two legs, except for the final which was played as a single leg.

== Qualifying rounds ==
For this edition, a total of 16 teams will compete in the tournament, which qualifying results will be determined after week 13 league matches. The 8 top teams from Super League will automatically qualify to the knockout stage as seeded. Super League teams ranked 9th until 14th and M3 League teams ranked 1st and 2nd placed will be drawn as unseeded. Teams that fail to progress to the quarter-finals will automatically continue the challenge at the 2023 MFL Challenge Cup.

== Schedule and draw dates ==
The draw for the 2023 Malaysia Cup was held on 15 June 2023.

Phase	Round	First leg	Second leg
Knockout phase	Round of 16	3–5 August 2023	18–20 August 2023
Knockout phase	Quarter-finals	13 & 15–17 September 2023	23–25 September 2023
Knockout phase	Semi-finals	19 & 21 October 2023	2–3 November 2023
Knockout phase	Final	8 December 2023	

== Seeding ==
Teams were divided to their pots according to their placements in the 2023 Malaysia Super League and 2023 Malaysia M3 League. Pot A included the top 8 teams from the Super League, Pot B included the ranked 9th until 14th placed from the Super League. The Pot C included the top two teams from M3 League will represent the tournament subject to approval from the MFL Board of Directors. The results seeding will be determined after week 13 league matches.

Pot A (seeded) (Top 8 teams from Super League)	Pot B (unseeded) (9th until 14th placed from Super League)	Pot C (unseeded) (Top two teams from M3 League)
Johor Darul Ta'zim; Selangor; Sri Pahang; Kedah Darul Aman; Sabah; Kuala Lumpur City; Terengganu; Negeri Sembilan	PDRM; Penang; Perak; Kelantan United; Kuching City; Kelantan	Kuala Lumpur Rovers; Harini Selangor

== Knockout stage ==
In the knockout phase, teams played against each other over two legs on a home-and-away basis, except for the final which was played as a single-leg game.

=== Bracket ===
The bracket was decided after the draw for the round of 16, which was held on 15 June 2023.

Round of 16
Kuching City	0	1	1
Sabah	3	1	4
Perak	3	1	4
Kedah Darul Aman	1	2	3
Kelantan United	0	2	2
Negeri Sembilan	1	4	5
Kelantan	1	0	1
Johor Darul Ta'zim	5	10	15
Penang	0	0	0
Kuala Lumpur City	4	1	5
Harini Selangor	2	0	2
Sri Pahang	3	2	5
Kuala Lumpur Rovers	0	0	0
Terengganu	4	3	7
PDRM	1	2	3
Selangor	4	1	5

Quarter-finals
Sabah	2	0	2
Perak	2	1	3
Negeri Sembilan	0	1	1
Johor Darul Ta'zim	3	4	7
Kuala Lumpur City	1	1	2
Sri Pahang	0	1	1
Terengganu	2	1	3
Selangor	0	1	1

Semi-finals
Perak	1	1	2
Johor Darul Ta'zim	4	8	12
Kuala Lumpur City	1	1	2
Terengganu	2	2	4

Final
Johor Darul Ta'zim	3
Terengganu	1

=== Round of 16 ===
The first legs were played on 3, 4, and 5 August, and the second legs were played on 18, 19 and 20 August 2023. The losers were transferred to the MFL Challenge Cup.

Team 1	Agg.	Team 2	1st leg	2nd leg
Perak	4–3	Kedah Darul Aman	3–1	1–2
Penang	0–5	Kuala Lumpur City	0–4	0–1
PDRM	3–5	Selangor	1–4	2–1
Kelantan	1–15	Johor Darul Ta'zim	1–5	0–10
Kuala Lumpur Rovers	0–7	Terengganu	0–4	0–3
Harini Selangor	2–5	Sri Pahang	2–3	0–2
Kelantan United	2–5	Negeri Sembilan	0–1	2–4
Kuching City	1–4	Sabah	0–3	1–1

=== Quarter-finals ===
The first legs were played on 13, 15, 16 & 17 September, and the second legs were played on 23, 24 and 25 September 2023.

Team 1	Agg.	Team 2	1st leg	2nd leg
Negeri Sembilan	1–7	Johor Darul Ta'zim	0–3	1–4
Sabah	2–3	Perak	2–2	0–1
Terengganu	3–1	Selangor	2–0	1–1
Kuala Lumpur City	2–1	Sri Pahang	1–0	1–1

=== Semi-finals ===
The first legs were played on 19 and 21 October 2023, and the second legs were played on 2 and 3 November 2023.

Team 1	Agg.	Team 2	1st leg	2nd leg
Perak	2–12	Johor Darul Ta'zim	1–4	1–8
Kuala Lumpur City	2–4	Terengganu	1–2	1–2

=== Final ===
The final will be played on 8 December 2023 at the Bukit Jalil National Stadium in Kuala Lumpur.

8 December 2023
21:00 UTC+8

Johor Darul Ta'zim	3–1	Terengganu
Bergson 6' (pen.); Feroz 73'; Arif Aiman 90+4' (pen.)	Report	Mamut 21' (pen.)

Bukit Jalil National Stadium, Kuala Lumpur
Attendance: 80,550
Referee: S. Logeswaran

== Statistics ==
=== Top goalscorers ===
Rank	Player	Club	Goals
1	(Brazil) Bergson	Johor Darul Ta'zim	11
2	(Croatia) Ivan Mamut	Terengganu	9
3	(Malaysia) Arif Aiman	Johor Darul Ta'zim	5
3	(Brazil) Heberty	Johor Darul Ta'zim	5
5	(Ivory Coast) Kipré Tchétché	Kuala Lumpur City	4
5	(Colombia) Romel Morales	Kuala Lumpur City	4
7	(Argentina) Luciano Guaycochea	Perak	3
7	(Brazil) Ramon Machado	Sabah	3
9	11 players	5 clubs	2
10	39 players	14 clubs	1

=== Own goals ===
Rank	Player	Team	Against	Date	Goal
1	(Malaysia) Harith Haiqal	Selangor	PDRM	19 August 2023	1

== See also ==
- 2023 Piala Sumbangsih
- 2023 Malaysia Super League
- 2023 Malaysia M3 League
