= Ivan Mamut =

Croatian footballer (born 1997)

- Mamut with Persija in 2026

Personal information
- Date of birth: 30 April 1997 (age 29)
- Place of birth: Split, Croatia
- Height: 1.92 m (6 ft 4 in)
- Position: Forward

Team information
- Current team: Persija Jakarta
- Number: 17

Youth career
- 2012: RNK Split
- 2012–2015: Hajduk Split

Senior career*
Years	Team	Apps	(Gls)
2015–2016	Hajduk Split	0	(0)
2015	→ Hrvace (loan)	12	(6)
2016	→ Primorac Stobreč (loan)	10	(2)
2016–2021	Inter Zaprešić	82	(17)
2017–2018	→ Sesvete (loan)	26	(8)
2020–2021	→ Universitatea Craiova (loan)	9	(4)
2021	Universitatea Craiova	23	(3)
2021–2022	FCSB	13	(1)
2023–2025	Terengganu	32	(22)
2025–2026	Varaždin	30	(11)
2026–	Persija Jakarta	8	(3)
- * Club domestic league appearances and goals as of 8 November 2026

Ivan Mamut (born 30 April 1997) is a Croatian professional footballer who plays as a forward for Super League club Persija Jakarta.

== Club career ==
=== Hajduk Split ===
Mamut was promoted to the Hajduk Split senior squad in 2015. After that, he was loaned to Hrvace and NK Primorac 1929

=== Inter Zaprešić ===
In 2016, he signed for NK Inter Zaprešić in the Croatian First Football League, where he has made seventy-two appearances and scored thirteen goals.

=== Universitatea Craiova ===
On 15 January 2021, Mamut join Universitatea Craiova.

=== FCSB ===
During the summer of 2021, Mamut joined FCSB.

=== Terengganu FC ===
In January 2023, Mamut moved to Malaysia to signed a one-year contract for Malaysia Super League club, Terengganu FC. On 4 August 2023, Mamut scored his first senior hat-trick of his career in the 2023 Malaysia Cup Round of 16 first leg fixtures against Kuala Lumpur Rovers. On 14 August 2023, he bagged himself his second hat-trick of the season in an 8–0 victory in the East Coast Derby against rivals Kelantan.On 20 September 2023, Mamut made his AFC Cup debut, starting in a 1–0 win over Central Coast Mariners.

On 28 December 2023, Mamut officially signed an extended contract to stay with club Terengganu FC for next season's competition 2024–25.

He signed for NK Varaždin in June 2025.

=== NK Varadžin ===
In June 2025, Mamut signed for Croatian Football League club, NK Varaždin. He made 36 appearances and scored 14 goals in the League, Croatian Cup, and UEFA Conference League Qualifiers.

=== Persija Jakarta ===
After negotiations, Mamut joined Indonesian club Persija Jakarta on 8 September 2026. He made his debut on Indonesian El Clásico, against rivals Persib Bandung in which he scored the winning goal.

== Career statistics ==
=== Club ===
As of match played 12 September 2026

Appearances and goals by club, season and competition
Club	Season	League			National Cup		Continental		Other		Total	
Club	Season	Division	Apps	Goals	Apps	Goals	Apps	Goals	Apps	Goals	Apps	Goals
Inter Zaprešić	2016–17	1. HNL	16	1	2	0	—		—		18	1
Inter Zaprešić	2017–18	1. HNL	0	0	—		—		—		0	0
Inter Zaprešić	2018–19	1. HNL	21	4	3	2	—		—		24	6
Inter Zaprešić	2019–20	1. HNL	30	6	3	0	—		—		33	6
Inter Zaprešić	2020–21	2. HNL	7	4	—		—		—		7	4
Inter Zaprešić	Total		74	15	8	2	—	—	—	—	82	17
Sesvete (loan)	2017–18	2. HNL	26	8	2	1	—		—		28	9
Universitatea Craiova	2020–21	Liga I	23	1	3	2	—		—		26	3
FCSB	2021–22	Liga I	11	1	0	0	—		—		11	1
FCSB	2022–23	Liga I	2	0	0	0	1	0	—		3	0
FCSB	Total		13	1	0	0	1	0	—	—	14	1
Terengganu	2023	Malaysia Super League	32	22	6	9	5	1	4	2	47	34
Varazdin	2025–26	Croatian Football League	25	9	2	1	2	1	—		29	11
Varazdin	2026–27	Croatian Football League	5	2	0	0	2	1	—		7	3
Varazdin	Total		30	11	2	1	4	2	—	—	36	14
Persija Jakarta	2026–27	Super League	1	1	0	0	0	0	—		1	1
Career total			199	59	21	15	10	3	4	2	232	78

== Honours ==
Universitatea Craiova

- Cupa României: 2020–21

Terengganu FC

- Malaysia Charity Shield runner-up: 2023
- Malaysia Cup runner-up: 2023
