= Southern Derby (Malaysia) =

Nickname for the three major football clubs in southern Malaysia

The Southern Derby (Malay: Derbi Selatan) is the nickname of the three major football clubs in southern Malaysia. The teams of Johor Darul Ta'zim F.C., Negeri Sembilan FC, and Melaka United FC have a great rivalry and are usually among the main contenders for the Malaysia Super League

Location of the three Southern Derby clubs in Peninsular Malaysia.

Johor Darul Ta'zim is the team with the most championships, having won 12 titles. Negeri Sembilan and Melaka United have both won just 1 Malaysian championship in their history. The lowest positions the sides have ever finished in league history were 17th for Melaka United and 16th for Negeri Sembilan, both occurring during the 1987 season, and 9th for Johor Darul Ta'zim during the 2012 season.

The teams also competed in Asian club competitions since the 1980s. Johor Darul Ta'zim is the only Malaysian team to have won a continental trophy, having won the AFC Cup in 2015.

The Southern Derby is regarded as a popular and anticipated football rivalries in Malaysia, with a fanbase across the southern region. Matches between these three clubs consistently draw large crowds to the stadiums and attract television viewership. Beyond matchday attendance, the rivalry generates media coverage and high digital engagement.

== The three-way rivalry ==
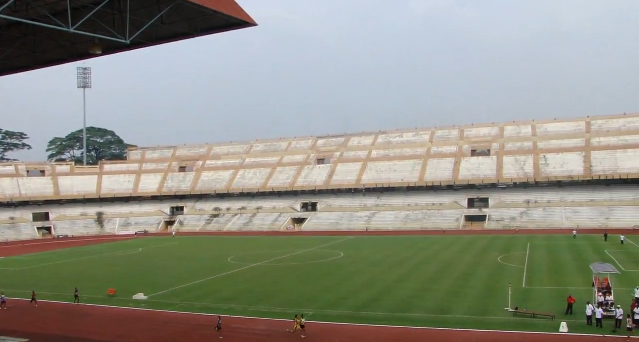
Tuanku Abdul Rahman Stadium

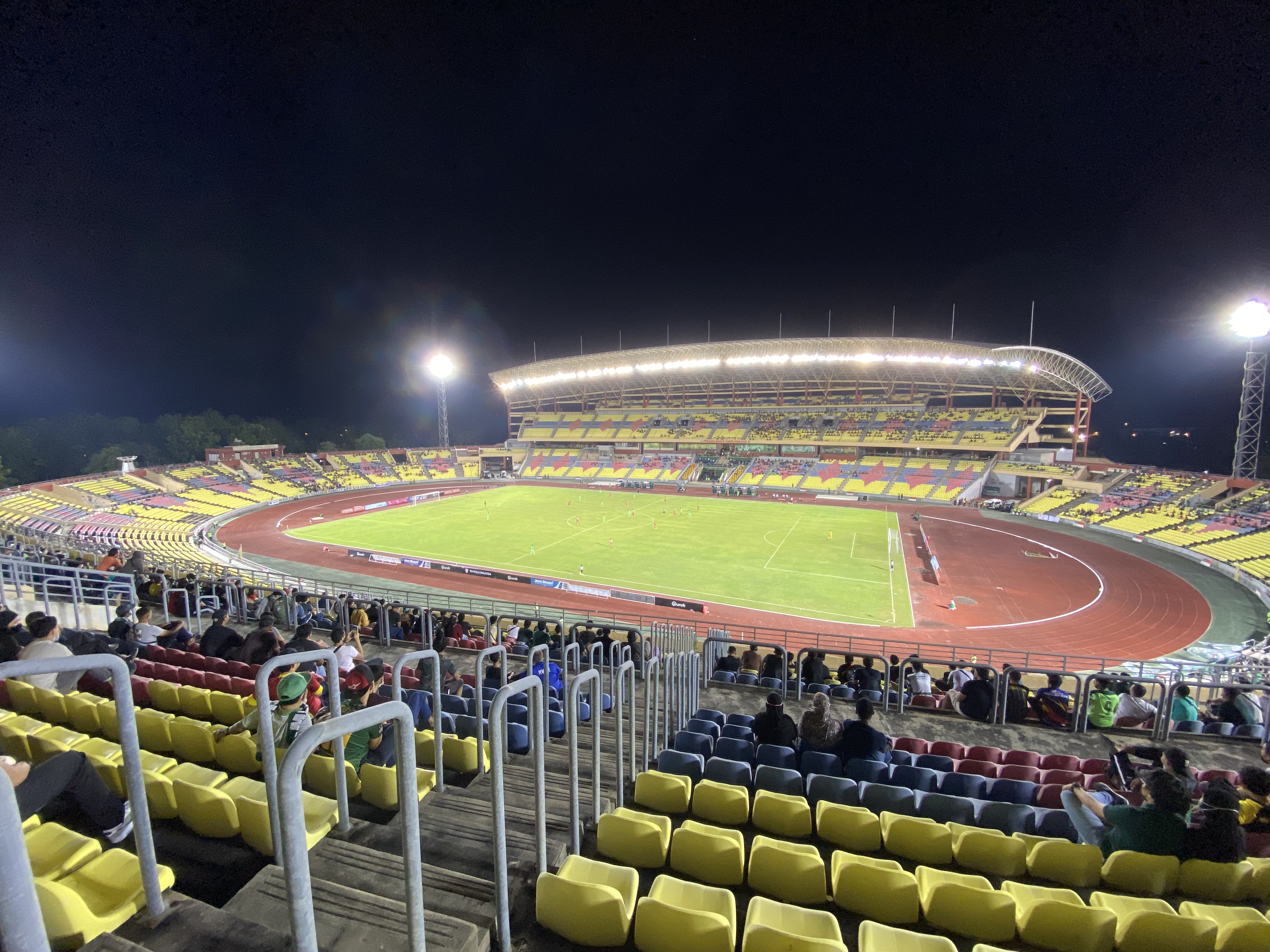
Hang Jebat Stadium

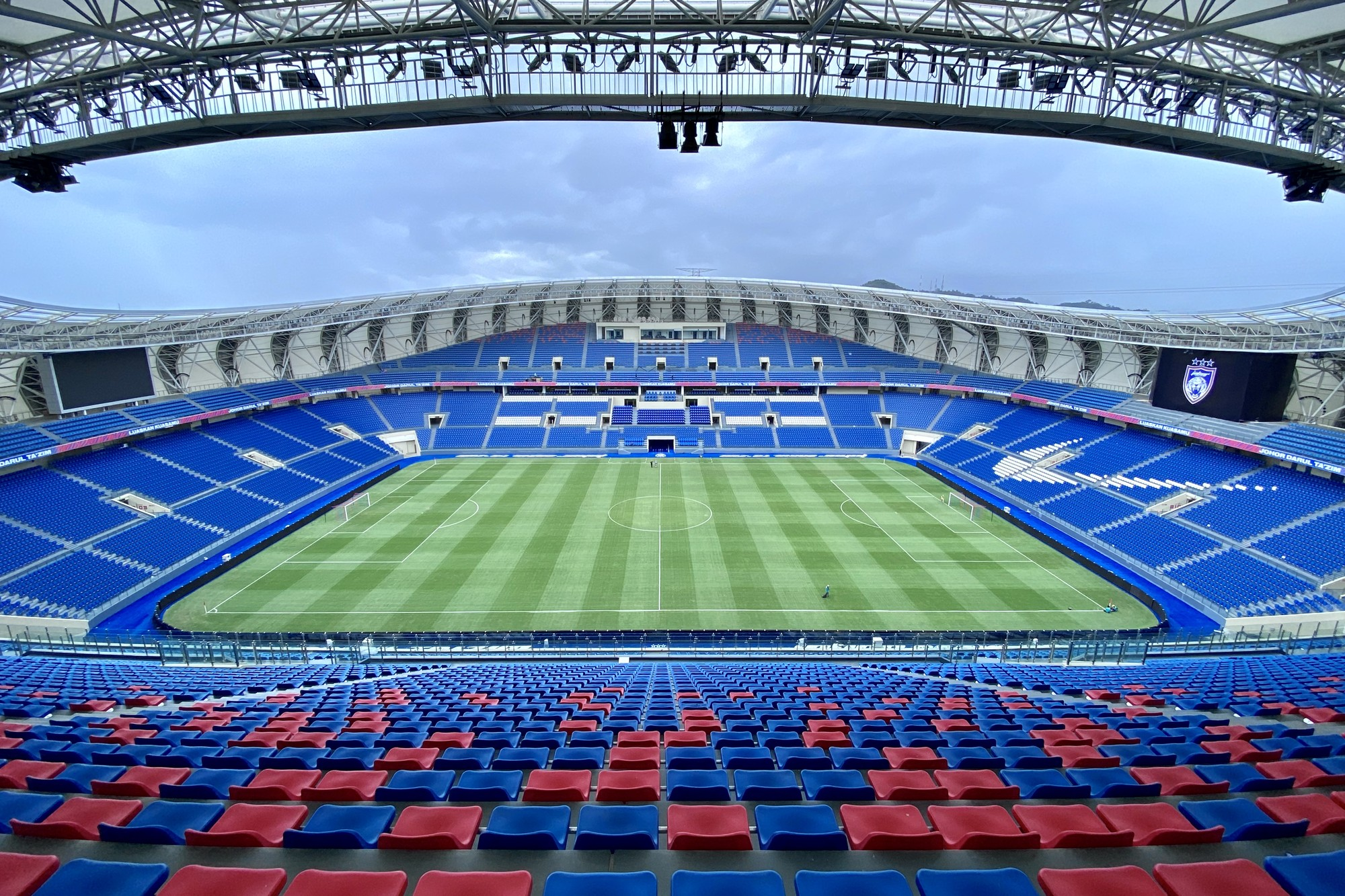
Sultan Ibrahim Stadium

As of 9 January 2026

=== Johor DT vs. Negeri Sembilan ===
| Team | Pl | W | D | L | GF | GA |
|---|---|---|---|---|---|---|
| Johor DT | 36 | 19 | 6 | 11 | 72 | 43 |
| Negeri Sembilan | 36 | 11 | 6 | 19 | 43 | 72 |

=== Melaka Utd vs. Negeri Sembilan ===
| Team | Pld | W | D | L | GF | GA |
|---|---|---|---|---|---|---|
| Melaka Utd | 63 | 23 | 15 | 25 | 61 | 74 |
| Negeri Sembilan | 63 | 25 | 15 | 23 | 74 | 61 |

=== Melaka Utd vs. Johor DT ===
| Team | Pld | W | D | L | GF | GA |
|---|---|---|---|---|---|---|
| Melaka Utd | 31 | 1 | 7 | 23 | 21 | 83 |
| Johor DT | 31 | 23 | 7 | 1 | 83 | 21 |

== Statistics ==
=== League placements ===
| Club | 1st | 2nd | 3rd | 4th | 5th | 6th | 7th | 8th | 9th | 10th | 11th | 12th | 13th | Total | Top 3 |
|---|---|---|---|---|---|---|---|---|---|---|---|---|---|---|---|
| Johor DT | 12 | | 2 | 2 | | 2 | 2 | | 1 | | | | | 21 | 14 |
| Negeri Sembilan | 1 | 1 | 3 | 1 | | 3 | 3 | 2 | 3 | 2 | 2 | 5 | 1 | 27 | 5 |
| Melaka Utd | 1 | | | 1 | | 2 | 1 | 2 | 1 | 1 | 3 | 1 | 3 | 16 | 1 |

=== Head-to-head ranking in Malaysian league ===
Promoted Relegated Melaka dissolved in 2022

| P. | 82 | 83 | 84 | 85 | 86 | 87 | 88 | 89 | 90 | 91 | 92 | 93 | 94 | 95 | 96 | 97 | 98 | 99 | 00 | 01 | 02 | 03 | 04 | 05 | 06 | 07 | 08 | 09 | 10 | 11 | 12 | 13 | 14 | 15 | 16 | 17 | 18 | 19 | 20 | 21 | 22 | 23 | 24 | 25 |
|---|---|---|---|---|---|---|---|---|---|---|---|---|---|---|---|---|---|---|---|---|---|---|---|---|---|---|---|---|---|---|---|---|---|---|---|---|---|---|---|---|---|---|---|---|
| 1 | | 1 | | | | | | | | | | | | | | | | | | | | | | | 1 | | | | | | | | 1 | 1 | 1 | 1 | 1 | 1 | 1 | 1 | 1 | 1 | 1 | 1 |
| 2 | | | | | | | | | | | | | | | | | | | | | | | | | | | 2 | | | | | | | | | | | | | | | | | |
| 3 | | | | | | | | | | | 3 | | | | 3 | | | 3 | | | | | | | | | 3 | | | | | 3 | | | | | | | | | | | | |
| 4 | 4 | | | | | | | | | | | | | | | | | | | | | | | | | | | 4 | 4 | | | | | | | | | | | | 4 | | | |
| 5 | | | | | | | | | | | | | | | | | | | | | | | | | | | | | | | | | | | | | | | | | | | | |
| 6 | | | 6 | | | | | | | | | | | | | | | | 6 | | 6 | | | | | 6 | | | 6 | | 6 | | | | | | | 6 | | | | | | |
| 7 | | | | | | | | | | | | | | | | 7 | | | | | | 7 | | | | | | 7 | | 7 | | | | | | | 7 | | | | | | | 7 |
| 8 | | | | | | | | | | | | | | | | | | | | 8 | | | | | | | | | | 8 | | | | | | 8 | | | | 8 | | | | |
| 9 | | | 9 | | | | | | | | | | | | | | 9 | | | | | | | | | | | | | | 9 | | | | | | | | 13 | | | 9 | | |
| 10 | | | | | | | 10 | | | | | 10 | | | | | | | | | | | | | | | | | | | | | | | | | | | | | 10 | | | |
| 11 | | | | | | | | | | | | | | 11 | | | | | | 11 | 11 | 11 | | | | 11 | | | | | | | | | | | | | | | | | | |
| 12 | | | | | 12 | | | | | | | | 12 | | 12 | | | | | | | | | | | | | | | | | 12 | | | | | 12 | | | | | | 12 | |
| 13 | | 13 | | | | | 13 | | | | | | | 13 | | | | | | | | | | | | 13 | | | | | | | | | | | | | | | | | | |
| 14 | | | | | 14 | | | | | | | | | | | 14 | | | | | 14 | | | | | | | | | | | | | | | | | | | | | | | |
| 15 | | | | 15 | | | | | | | | | | | | | | | | | | | | | | | | | | | | | | | | | | | | | | | | |
| 16 | | | | | | 16 | | | | | | | | | | | | | | | | | | | | | | | | | | | | | | | | | | | | | | |
| 17 | | | | | | 17 | | | | | | | | | | | | | | | | | | | | | | | | | | | | | | | | | | | | | | |
| 18 | | | | | | | | | | | | | | | | | | | | | | | | | | | | | | | | | | | | | | | | | | | | |
| 19 | | | | | | | | | | | | | | | | | | | | | | | | | | | | | | | | | | | | | | | | | | | | |
| 20 | | | | | | | | | | | | | | | | | | | | | | | | | | | | | | | | | | | | | | | | | | | | |

== Honours comparison ==
As of 17 May 2026

- Numbers with this background indicate the record in the competition.

| Organization | Johor Darul Ta'zim | Negeri Sembilan | Melaka United |
National
| Malaysia Super League (Division 1) | 12 | 1 | 1 |
| Malaysia Premier League (Division 2) | 1 | 2 | 1 |
| Malaysia FAM League (Division 3) | 2 | — | 1 |
| Malaysia Cup | 6 | 3 | — |
| Malaysia FA Cup | 5 | 2 | — |
| Malaysian Charity Shield | 11 | 1 | — |
| Aggregate | 36 | 9 | 3 |
Continental
| AFC Cup | 1 | — | — |
| Aggregate | 1 | — | — |
| Total | 37 | 9 | 3 |

== Asia Competition ==
As of 23 May 2026

| Club | AFC Champions League Elite | | | | AFC Champions League Two | | |
| Club | Winner | Knockout Stage | Group Stage | Qualification | Winner | Knockout Stage | Group Stage |
|---|---|---|---|---|---|---|---|
| Johor Darul Ta'zim | — | 2022 (R16), 2024 (R16), 2025 (QF) | 2019, 2020, 2021, 2023 | 1996, 2015, 2016, 2017, 2018 | 2015 | 2016 (SF), 2017 (Zonal SF) | 2009 2018 |
| Negeri Sembilan | — | — | — | — | — | — | 2004, 2007 |
| Melaka United | — | — | — | 1985 | — | — | — |

== Footballers who have played for all three clubs ==
- (Malaysia) Nazrin Nawi (Negeri Sembilan 2012-2013, Johor Darul Ta'zim 2014-2016, Melaka United 2019)

== Managers who have managed all three clubs ==
- (Malaysia) K. Devan (Negeri Sembilan 2003-2006, 2015, 2021-2022, Melaka FA 2007, Johor FC 2012)

== See also ==
- Royal Derby
- East Coast Derby
- Klang Valley Derby
- Malayan El'Clasico
- List of association football rivalries
- List of sports rivalries
