= Selangor–Singapore rivalry =

Singapore–Selangor rivalry
- Other names: Clash of the Titans, Battle of the Giants, El Classico Malaya,
- Location: (Malaysia) Selangor; Singapore
- Teams: Selangor FA; Singapore FA
- First meeting: 1 October 1921; Singapore 2–1 Selangor; 1921 Malaya Cup
- Latest meeting: 10 December 1994; Selangor 2–2 Singapore (Singapore FA won 3–2 on aggregate); 1994 Malaysia Cup

Statistics
- Total meetings: 48
- All-time series: Singapore: 22; Draw: 6 Selangor: 19
- Largest victory: 27 August 1927; Selangor 8–1 Singapore; 1927 Malaya Cup
- Longest win streak: 3 matches (shared)

The Selangor–Singapore rivalry was a football rivalry that occurred between 1921 until 1994. It is the oldest football derby in Malaysian football.

The clubs were the most successful teams in Malaysia, having won 71 major honours between them, 28 for Singapore and 43 for Selangor. Most of the honours they won came from the Malaysia Cup. Both were also the most supported teams in Malaysian football. Every match between these two teams attracted high interest from fans due to its intensity.

Samad Allapitchay, the Singapore FA captain during the 1977 Malaysia Cup final noted to have said "The football rivalry between Singapore and Selangor has always been a special one. On the pitch, we hated each other".

== History ==
The first encounter of the teams, officially is on 1 October 1921 during 1921 Malaya Cup final where Singapore defeated Selangor with scoreline 2-1. Unofficially, there is a record of friendlies named 'Classics' from 1901 till 1913 between these two teams, with Singapore winning its first edition. During the pre-war years, Singapore and Selangor FA were a dominant force and fierce rivals, winning the Cup 19 times between them. The post war years were also dominated by Singapore and Selangor up till 1970, where Selangor emerged as the dominant force in the Malaysia Cup with eleven Cup wins, compared to two victories by Singapore.

The rivalries ended when Singapore pulled out from Malaysian League in 1994 due to dispute with Football Association of Malaysia (FAM) about ticketing issue. From 2011 till 2015, a new Singapore representative, the LIONSXII join the Malaysian League. However, the squad were the country under 23 team and bound to several specialty (will not have to face relegation and unable to recruit foreign players).

== List of matches ==
From 1921 to 1994.

#	Date	Tournament	Home team	Score	Away team
1	1 October 1921	1921 Malaya Cup	Selangor	1–2	Singapore
2	2 September 1922	1922 Malaya Cup	Selangor	3–2	Singapore
3	23 August 1924	1924 Malaya Cup	Selangor	0–1	Singapore
4	29 August 1925	1925 Malaya Cup	Singapore	2–1	Selangor
5	27 August 1927	1927 Malaya Cup	Selangor	8–1	Singapore
6	25 August 1928	1928 Malaya Cup	Selangor	2–2 (aet.)	Singapore
7	8 September 1928	Friendly Replay	Singapore	4–1	Selangor
8	31 August 1929	1929 Malaya Cup	Singapore	2–2 (aet.)	Selangor
9	30 August 1930	1930 Malaya Cup	Selangor	abandoned	Singapore
10	20 September 1930	1930 Malaya Cup	Singapore	3–0	Selangor
11	6 August 1932	1932 Malaya Cup	Selangor	3–5	Singapore
12	5 August 1933	1933 HMS Malaya Cup	Singapore	8–2	Selangor
13	10 August 1935	1935 HMS Malaya Cup	Selangor	2–0	Singapore
14	8 August 1936	1936 HMS Malaya Cup	Singapore	0–1	Selangor
15	7 August 1937	1937 HMS Malaya Cup	Selangor	1–2	Singapore
16	6 August 1938	1938 HMS Malaya Cup	Singapore	0–1	Selangor
17	19 August 1939	1939 HMS Malaya Cup	Selangor	1–3	Singapore
18	1956	1956 HMS Malaya Cup	Selangor	2–1	Singapore
19	1965	1965 HMS Malaya Cup	Singapore	3–1	Selangor
20	1967	1967 FAM Cup	Singapore	2–1	Selangor
21	6 May 1974	1974 Malaysia Cup	Singapore	2–1	Selangor
22	31 August 1975	1975 Malaysia Cup	Selangor	1–0	Singapore
23	1976	1976 Malaysia Cup	Selangor	3–0	Singapore
24	13 May 1977	1977 Malaysia Cup	Selangor	1–2	Singapore
25	28 May 1977	1977 Malaysia Cup	Singapore	2–1	Selangor
26	1978	1978 Malaysia Cup	Selangor	4–2	Singapore
27	1979	1979 Malaysia Cup	Selangor	2–0	Singapore
28	28 May 1980	1980 Malaysia Cup	Selangor	1–0	Singapore
29	28 June 1980	1980 Malaysia Cup	Singapore	2–1	Selangor
30	1981	1981 Malaysia Cup	Selangor	4–0	Singapore
31	1985	1985 Malaysia Cup	Singapore	1–0	Selangor
32	25 January 1986	1986 Malaysia Cup	Selangor	1–3	Singapore
33	18 April 1986	1986 Malaysia Cup	Selangor	2–0	Singapore
34	23 April 1986	1986 Malaysia Cup	Selangor	5–1	Singapore
35	30 August 1987	1987 Malaysia Cup	Singapore	2–1	Selangor
36	23 August 1988	1988 Malaysia Cup	Selangor	0–1	Singapore
37	3 September 1989	1989 Malaysia Semi-Pro League Division 1	Selangor	1–0	Singapore
38	22 October 1989	1989 Malaysia Semi-Pro League Division 1	Singapore	0–1	Selangor
39	12 May 1990	1990 Malaysia Semi-Pro League Division 1	Selangor	0–0	Singapore
40	21 July 1990	1990 Malaysia Semi-Pro League Division 1	Singapore	5–2	Selangor
41	28 June 1991	1991 Malaysia Semi-Pro League Division 1	Singapore	2–1	Selangor
42	24 August 1991	1991 Malaysia Semi-Pro League Division 1	Selangor	1–1	Singapore
43	27 May 1992	1992 Malaysia Semi-Pro League Division 1	Selangor	2–1	Singapore
44	26 July 1992	1992 Malaysia Semi-Pro League Division 1	Singapore	4–0	Selangor
45	1993	1993 Malaysia Semi-Pro League Division 2	Selangor	3–2	Singapore
46	27 April 1994	1994 Malaysia Premier League	Selangor	1–1	Singapore
47	6 December 1994	1994 Malaysia Cup	Singapore	1–0	Selangor
48	10 December 1994	1994 Malaysia Cup	Selangor	2–2	Singapore

== Statistics ==
From 1921 to 1994

	Matches	Wins		Draws	Goals		Home wins		Home draws		Away wins	
	Matches	Singapore	Selangor	Draws	Singapore	Selangor	Singapore	Selangor	Singapore	Selangor	Singapore	Selangor
Malaysia Cup	37*	18	15	3	61	63	10	13	1	2	8	2
FAM Cup	1	1	0	0	2	1	1	0	0	0	0	0
Malaysia Semi-Pro League Division 1	8	3	3	2	13	8	3	2	0	2	0	1
Malaysia Semi-Pro League Division 2	1	0	1	0	2	3	0	1	0	0	0	0
Malaysia Premier League	1	0	0	1	1	1	0	0	0	1	0	0
All competitions	48	22	19	6	79	76	14	16	1	5	8	3

*include 1930 Malaya Cup abandoned match
Last updated: 20 July 2015

== Honours ==
Honours from 1921 until 1994.

Team	League				Cup				Grand Total
Team	Malaysia Super League	Malaysia Premier League	Malaysia FAM League	League Total	Malaysia Cup	Malaysia FA Cup	Sultan Haji Ahmad Shah Cup	Cup Total	Grand Total
Singapore FA	1	1	2	3	24	1	1	25	28
Selangor FA	3	1	7	11	27	1	4	32	43

== See also ==
- Sultan of Selangor Cup
- East Coast Derby
- Klang Valley Derby
- List of association football rivalries
- List of sports rivalries
