= 1923 Malaya Cup =

Piala Malaya

Tournament details
- Country: Malaya
- Teams: 7

Final positions
- Champions: Singapore (2nd title)
- Runner-up: Perak

Tournament statistics
- Matches played: 10
- Goals scored: 30 (3 per match)

This was the third season of the Malaya Cup (later known as the Malaysia Cup), an annual soccer tournament. It was contested by states in Malaya. The final was contested by the southern and northern champions in their respective conference rounds. Seven states sent their teams. The final was held at Selangor Club Field on 25 August 1923 where Singapore collected their second title in three consecutive final appearances against Perak with scoreline 2–1. It was during this year that a newspaper described it as "by far the greatest sporting event of the year (in Malaya)".

== Conference Round ==
Seven teams participated in the third edition of the Malaya Cup, Johor, Malacca, Negeri Sembilan, Singapore, Penang, Selangor and Perak. The teams were divided into two conferences, the Northern Section and Southern Section. The Northern Section comprised Penang, Selangor and Perak, while the Southern Section was composed of Johor, Negeri Sembilan, Malacca and Singapore. Each team played against each other (two games per team) and the winners of each conference played in the final. Each win gave the winning team 2 points while losing gave 0 points. A draw meant a point shared between two teams.

=== Northern Section ===
Team	Pld	W	D	L	GF	GA	GD	Pts
Perak	2	2	0	0	3	1	+2	4
Selangor	2	1	0	1	4	2	+2	2
Penang	2	0	0	2	0	4	-4	0

July 22, 1923
Penang	0–1	Perak
August 16, 1923
Selangor	3–0	Penang
August 11, 1923
Perak	2–1	Selangor

=== Southern Section ===
Team	Pld	W	D	L	GF	GA	GD	Pts
Singapore	3	2	1	0	10	4	+6	5
Negeri Sembilan	3	1	2	0	6	3	+3	4
Malacca	3	1	1	1	3	3	0	3
Johor	3	0	0	3	1	10	-9	0

July 21, 1923
Negeri Sembilan	3–3	Singapore
July 28, 1923
Johor	0–3	Negeri Sembilan
August 3, 1923
Malacca	3–0	Johor
August 11, 1923
Negeri Sembilan	0–0	Malacca
Johor	1–4	Singapore
August 18, 1923
Singapore	3–0	Malacca

== Final ==
The final was held at Selangor Club Field on 25 August 1923. Singapore won the match 2–1 against Perak. This was Singapore's second title in three consecutive final appearances.

25 August 1923

Singapore	2 – 1	Perak
Jamieson ?'; Smith ?'		Osman ?'

Selangor Club Field, Kuala Lumpur

== Winners ==
1923 Malaya Cup Winner

Singapore
Second Title
