= 1925 Malaya Cup =

Piala Malaya

Tournament details
- Country: Malaya
- Teams: 7

Final positions
- Champions: Singapore (4th title)
- Runner-up: Selangor

Tournament statistics
- Matches played: 7
- Goals scored: 27 (3.86 per match)

Malaya Cup was a tournament held annually by a Malaya Cup committee.

This was the fifth season of Malaya Cup (later known as Malaysia Cup). It was contested by states in Malaya. The final was contested by the southern and northern champions in their respective conference rounds. Six states sent their teams.

== Conference Round ==
Six teams participated in the second edition of the Malaya Cup: Malacca, Negeri Sembilan, Singapore, Penang, Selangor and Perak. The teams were divided into two conferences, the Northern Section and Southern Section. The Northern Section comprised Penang, Selangor and Perak while the Southern Section was represented by Johor, Negeri Sembilan, Malacca and Singapore. Each team would play against each other twice and the winners of each conference would play in the final. Each win gave a team 2 points, a draw meant one point for each team, and a loss was worth 0 points.

=== Northern Section ===
Team	Pld	W	D	L	GF	GA	GD	Pts
Selangor	2	2	0	0	6	2	+4	4
Perak	2	1	0	1	2	1	+1	2
Penang	2	0	0	2	2	7	-5	0'

July 25, 1925
Penang	0–2	Perak
August 8, 1925
Perak	0–1	Selangor
August 15, 1925
Selangor	5–2	Penang

=== Southern Section ===
Team	Pld	W	D	L	GF	GA	GD	Pts
Singapore	2	2	0	0	12	1	+11	4
Negeri Sembilan	2	1	0	1	1	5	-4	2
Malacca	2	0	0	2	1	8	-7	0

August 8, 1925
Malacca	0–1	Negeri Sembilan
August 15, 1925
Negeri Sembilan	0–5	Singapore
August 22, 1925
Singapore	7–1	Malacca

== Final ==
The final was held at Anson Road Stadium on 29 August 1925 where Singapore recorded their first hat-trick in winning the Malaya Cup, by defeating Selangor by a score of 2–1. The match was a rematch of last year's final and the first final to be held in Singapore.

29 August 1925

Singapore	2 – 1	Selangor
Smith ?'; Yong Lian ?'		Hong Kuan ?'

Anson Road Stadium, Singapore

== Winners ==
1925 Malaya Cup Winner

Singapore
Fourth Title
