= East Coast Derby =

Football rivalry in Malaysia

- Logo of Kelantan FA vs Terengganu FC
- Other names: The Red Warriors vs. The Turtles
- Location: Malaysia's East Coast
- Teams: Kelantan FC (Formerly known as Kelantan FA); Terengganu FC (Formerly known as Terengganu FA)
- Latest meeting: 27 May 2023; Terengganu 4-2 Kelantan; 2023 Malaysia FA Cup
- Stadiums: Sultan Mizan Zainal Abidin Stadium (Terengganu); Sultan Mohammad IV Stadium (Kelantan)

Statistics
- Total meetings: 61
- Most wins: Kelantan (25 wins)
- Top scorer: Mohd Badhri Mohd Radzi (8)
- All-time series (Malaysia Super League only): Kelantan: 8 Drawn: 4 Terengganu: 8
- Largest victory: Kelantan 6-1 Terengganu (2012); Kelantan 0-8 Terengganu FC (2023)
- Longest win streak: 3 games (shared)

East Coast Derby is the name given to a football derby match between Malaysian teams Kelantan and Terengganu. The rivalry between the teams has developed since the 1980s and was known for the intense fan engagement on both sides.

== History ==
Kelantan FA was founded in 1946 as the Kelantan Amateur Football Association (Malay: Persatuan Bola Sepak Amatur Kelantan). In 1986, the former chief minister of Kelantan, Datuk Haji Ahmad Rastom Haji Ahmad Maher was appointed president.

Terengganu FC was founded in 1956 as Terengganu Football Association (Malay: Persatuan Bolasepak Negeri Terengganu). In 1999, Dato' Haji Che Mat bin Jusoh, who was the Terengganu president at that time, was appointed to lead the team.

The teams developed a regional rivalry in Malaysia's east coast starting in the mid-1980s. They have been less successful in comparison to their neighbours Pahang FA.

However, the only time the East Coast derby was ever contested with a title in stake was in the 2011 Malaysia FA Cup final. Terengganu won the match 2-1, after extra time.

== Stadiums ==
Team	Stadium	Capacity	Image
Kelantan	Sultan Mohammad IV Stadium	22,000	
Terengganu	Sultan Mizan Zainal Abidin Stadium	50,000	

== List of matches ==
From 1983 to 2023

#	Date	Home team	Away team	Score	Goals (home)	Goals (away)
1	11 February 1983	Terengganu	Kelantan	1-1		
2	20 January 1984	Kelantan	Terengganu	2-0		
3	7 February 1986	Kelantan	Terengganu	1-1		
4	10 July 1987	Terengganu	Kelantan	1-1		
5	29 July 1988	Kelantan	Terengganu	3-0		
6	11 May 1990	Kelantan	Terengganu	1-2		
7	30 June 1990	Terengganu	Kelantan	3-1		
8	25 May 1991	Kelantan	Terengganu	1-0		
9	11 August 1991	Terengganu	Kelantan	2-0		
10	10 August 1993	Kelantan	Terengganu	3-3		
11	14 August 1993	Terengganu	Kelantan	1-1		
12	26 April 1997	Terengganu	Kelantan	1-2		
13	29 July 1997	Kelantan	Terengganu	3-0		
14	10 March 1998	Kelantan	Terengganu	3-2		
15	21 March 1998	Terengganu	Kelantan	2-1		
16	22 May 1998	Kelantan	Terengganu	0-0		
17	31 July 1998	Terengganu	Kelantan	2-3		
18	3 April 2001	Kelantan	Terengganu	2-2		
19	7 July 2001	Terengganu	Kelantan	1-2		
20	2 March 2002	Terengganu	Kelantan	1-2		
21	15 June 2002	Kelantan	Terengganu	0-2		
22	25 March 2003	Terengganu	Kelantan	1-2		
23	20 May 2003	Kelantan	Terengganu	2-2		
24	15 February 2004	Terengganu	Kelantan	0-0		
25	4 July 2004	Terengganu	Kelantan	0-0		
26	8 January 2006	Kelantan	Terengganu	1-3	Safuan Ibrahim 90'	Fabio Flor 30', Helton Soares 87' (pen.), Norizam Ali Hassan 89'
27	9 May 2006	Kelantan	Terengganu	2-2		
28	3 March 2007	Kelantan	Terengganu	0-2		
29	5 May 2007	Terengganu	Kelantan	1-2		
30	27 June 2008	Terengganu	Kelantan	1-2		
31	12 July 2008	Kelantan	Terengganu	0-1		
32	14 February 2009	Kelantan	Terengganu	3-2		
33	30 June 2009	Terengganu	Kelantan	2-0		
34	9 January 2010	Terengganu	Kelantan	0-0		
35	15 May 2010	Kelantan	Terengganu	3-0		
36	1 February 2011	Kelantan	Terengganu	1-1		
37	6 June 2011	Terengganu	Kelantan	0-3		
38	11 June 2011	Terengganu	Kelantan	2-1 (aet)	Daudsu 90+8' (o.g.), Nordin Alias 110'	Azwan Roya 79'
39	10 October 2011	Terengganu	Kelantan	3-1	Ismail Faruqi 45', Manaf Mamat 89', Marzuki Yusof 90'	Badri Radzi 80' (pen.)
40	14 October 2011	Kelantan	Terengganu	2-2	Azamuddin Akil 55', Badri Radzi 70' (pen.)	Ashaari Shamsuddin 19', 40'
41	11 February 2012	Kelantan	Terengganu	2-1	Norshahrul Idlan Talaha 37', Badri Radzi 54'	Manaf Mamat 90+3'
42	23 May 2012	Kelantan	Terengganu	3-2	Norfarhan 4', 17', Rizal Fahmi 45+2'	Ismail Faruqi 56', Francis Doe 85' (pen.)
43	26 June 2012	Terengganu	Kelantan	2-2	Hadi Yahya 40', Muslim Ahmad 50'	Norfarhan 5', Badri Radzi 20'
44	22 August 2012	Terengganu	Kelantan	2-0	Francis Doe 3', Ismail Faruqi 89'	
45	14 September 2012	Kelantan	Terengganu	6-1	Afiq Azmi 13', Norfarhan 29' 47', Badri Radzi 76' 81', Indra Putra 86'	Hasmizan 79'
46	19 February 2013	Kelantan	Terengganu	2-0	Keita Mandjou 33', 65'	
47	25 May 2013	Kelantan	Terengganu	4-1	Nwakaeme 79', Indra Putra 88', Nwaneri 90+2' (pen.), Zairo Anuar 90+3'	Ashaari Shamsuddin 2'
48	26 May 2013	Terengganu	Kelantan	4-2 (aet)	Vincent Bikana 5', G. Puaneswaran 27', Effa Owona 71', Manaf Mamat 90+2'	Nwaneri 90+5'; Dickson Nwakaeme 129'
49	21 June 2013	Terengganu	Kelantan	0-4		Badri Radzi 13', Dickson Nwakaeme 47', Norfarhan 50', Faiz Subri 56'
50	24 August 2013	Kelantan	Terengganu	2-0	Dickson Nwakaeme 11', Zairo Anuar 73'	
51	17 September 2013	Terengganu	Kelantan	1-3	Ashaari Shamsuddin 75'	Hasmizan 28' (o.g.), Indra Putra 57', Badri Radzi 86'
52	29 March 2014	Terengganu	Kelantan	3-0	Awarded	
53	25 June 2014	Kelantan	Terengganu	2-3	Fakri Saarani 4', Khairul Izuan 27'	Manaf Mamat 74', 79', Norfarhan 81'
54	4 April 2015	Terengganu	Kelantan	2-1	Ismail Faruqi 50', Shahrin 79'	Badri Radzi 76'
55	1 August 2015	Kelantan	Terengganu	1-2	Fakri Saarani 1'	Vincent Bikana 25', Ashaari Shamsuddin 73'
56	23 April 2016	Kelantan	Terengganu	3-0	Wan Zack 14', Wan Zaharul 63', Fakhrul Zaman 89'	
57	15 July 2016	Terengganu	Kelantan	1-6	Issey Nakajima 7'	Blazhe Ilijoski 3' 63' 75' 85', Wander Luiz 44', Wan Zack 58'
58	6 February 2018	Kelantan	Terengganu	1-1	Do Dong Hyun 38'	Kipre Tchetche 1'
59	23 July 2018	Terengganu	Kelantan	2-0	Kipre 45', Kamal 54'	
60	4 April 2023	Terengganu	Kelantan	5-0		

== Statistics ==
From 1983 to current

	Matches	Wins		Draws	Goals		Home wins		Home draws		Away wins	
	Matches	Terengganu	Kelantan	Draws	Terengganu	Kelantan	Terengganu	Kelantan	Terengganu	Kelantan	Terengganu	Kelantan
Malaysia Semi-Pro League Division 1	4	1	1	2	6	6	1	1	1	1	0	0
Malaysia Semi-Pro League Division 2	2	2	0	0	5	2	2	0	0	0	0	0
Malaysia Premier League 1	6	1	3	2	9	10	0	0	0	2	1	3
Malaysia Premier League 2	2	0	1	1	2	3	0	0	0	1	0	1
Malaysia Premier League 1 Play-Offs	2	1	1	0	4	4	1	1	0	0	0	0
Malaysia Premier League	6	1	2	3	7	8	0	1	2	1	1	1
Malaysia Super League	18	6	8	4	22	34	4	5	2	2	2	3
Malaysia FA Cup	3	2	1	0	7	7	2	1	0	0	0	0
Malaysia Cup	15	4	7	4	17	25	2	3	2	2	2	4
AFC Cup	1	0	1	0	0	2	0	1	0	0	0	0
All competitions	59	18	25	16	79	103	12	13	7	9	6	12

Last updated: 6 February 2018

== Honours ==
Kelantan has a larger series of honours with 11 titles compared to Terengganu (7). Kelantan is also one of the only four Malaysian football teams that have achieved The Treble. The other is Kedah FA (2006/07, 2007/08), Johor Darul Ta'zim (2022, 2023, 2024/25, 2025/26) and Selangor FA (2005)

Team	League				Cup				Grand Total
Team	Malaysia Super League	Malaysia Premier League	Malaysia FAM League	League Total	Malaysia Cup	Malaysia FA Cup	Sultan Haji Ahmad Shah Cup	Cup Total	Grand Total
Kelantan	2	1	3	6	2	2	1	5	11
Terengganu	0	2	1	3	1	2	1	4	7

== See also ==
- Royal Derby
- Southern Derby
- Klang Valley Derby
- Malayan El'Clasico
- List of association football rivalries
- List of sports rivalries
