= 1963 Malaya Cup =

Piala Malaya

Tournament details
- Country: Malaysia
- Teams: 15

Final positions
- Champions: Selangor (13th title)
- Runners-up: Penang

Tournament statistics
- Goals scored: 630

Malaya Cup was a tournament held annually by a Malaya Cup committee. This is the 37th season of Malaya Cup (later known as Malaysia Cup). It were contested by states in Malaysia. The final were contested by the southern and northern champions in their respective conference round. Six states sent their teams.

The final were held at Merdeka Stadium, Kuala Lumpur on 29 September 1963 where Selangor winning Malaya Cup, by defeating Penang with scoreline 6–2.

== Conference Round ==
15 teams participated the Malaya Cup, Malacca, Negeri Sembilan, Singapore, Penang, Selangor and Perak. The teams were divided into two conference, the Northern Section and Southern Section. The Northern Section comprises Penang, Selangor and Perak while Southern Section represented by Johor, Negeri Sembilan, Malacca and Singapore. Each team will play with each other (two games per team) and the winners of each conference will play in the final. Each win will give the team 2 points while losing will give 0 points. A draw means a point were shared between two teams.

=== Northern Section ===
Team	Pld	W	D	L	GF	GA	GD	Pts
Selangor	12	12	0	0	91	10	+81	24
Penang	12	9	1	1	57	91	-34	19
Perak	12	8	0	4	49	20	+29	16
Kedah	12	3	3	6	22	41	-19	9
Kelantan	12	3	1	8	23	49	-26	7
Terengganu	12	2	1	9	11	57	-46	5
Perlis	12	1	2	9	15	72	-57	4

=== Southern Section ===
Team	Pld	W	D	L	GF	GA	GD	Pts
Singapore	14	12	0	2	65	15	+50	24
Malacca	14	9	1	4	52	25	+27	19
Johore	14	8	2	4	47	23	+24	18
Singapore Joint Services	14	7	2	5	40	30	+10	16
Negeri Sembilan	14	6	2	6	38	41	-3	14
Federation Armed Forces	14	6	1	7	51	40	+11	13
Commonwealth Combined Services	14	4	0	10	31	77	-46	8
Pahang	14	0	0	14	12	85	-73	0

== Semi-final ==
7 September 1963

Singapore	1–2	Penang

14 September 1963

Penang	1–1	Singapore

Penang FA won 3−2 on aggregate.

8 September 1963

Selangor	8–2	Malacca

15 September 1963

Malacca	2–1	Selangor

Selangor FA won 9−4 on aggregate.

== Final ==
The final were held at Merdeka Stadium, Kuala Lumpur on 29 September 1963. Selangor won the cup by defeating Penang with scoreline 6–2.

29 August 1963

Selangor	6 – 2	Penang
Abdul Ghani Minhat 6', 14', 57', 75'; Arthur Koh 54'; Stanley Gabrielle 87'		M. Kuppan 5'; Pang Siang Hock 24'

Merdeka Stadium, Kuala Lumpur

== Winners ==
1963 Malaya Cup Winner

Selangor
13th Title
