= 1924 Malaya Cup =

Piala Malaya

Tournament details
- Country: Malaya
- Teams: 6

Final positions
- Champions: Singapore (3rd title)
- Runner-up: Selangor

Tournament statistics
- Matches played: 7
- Goals scored: 20 (2.86 per match)

Malaya Cup was a tournament held annually by a Malaya Cup committee.

This is the fourth season of Malaya Cup (later known as Malaysia Cup). It were contested by states in Malaya. The final were contested by the southern and northern champions in their respective conference round. Six states sent their teams. The final were held at Selangor Club Field on 23 August 1924 where Singapore avenged their defeat against Selangor in a rematch of 1922 final's with a sole goal by Rogers.

== Conference Round ==
Six teams participated the third edition of the Malaya Cup, Malacca, Negeri Sembilan, Singapore, Penang, Selangor and Perak. Johor were unable to raise a team. The teams were divided into two conference, the Northern Section and Southern Section. The Northern Section consists of Penang, Selangor and Perak while Southern Section represented by Johor, Negeri Sembilan, Malacca and Singapore. Each team will play with each other (two games per team) and the winners of each conference will play in the final. Each win will give the team 2 points while losing will give 0 points. A draw means a point were shared between two teams.

=== Northern Section ===
Team	Pld	W	D	L	GF	GA	GD	Pts
Selangor	2	2	0	0	3	1	+2	4*
Penang	2	1	0	1	2	1	+1	2*
Perak	2	0	0	2	2	5	-3	0

July 12, 1924
Selangor	3–1	Perak
July 19, 1924
Selangor	beat	Penang*
July 26, 1924
Penang	2–1	Perak

*missing goals for July 19 match.

=== Southern Section ===
Team	Pld	W	D	L	GF	GA	GD	Pts
Singapore	2	2	0	0	10	0	+10	4
Negeri Sembilan **	3	0	1	1	1	6	-5	1
Malacca **	3	0	1	1	1	6	-5	1

July 21, 1924
Negeri Sembilan	1–1	Malacca
August 2, 1924
Singapore	5–0	Negeri Sembilan
August 16, 1924
Malacca	0–5	Singapore

**Both teams share second place.

== Final ==
The final were held at Selangor Club Field on 23 August 1924 where Singapore avenged their defeat against Selangor in a rematch of 1922 final's with a sole goal by Rogers. It was Singapore second successive title in four consecutive final appearances.

23 August 1924
17:00 UTC+8

Singapore	1 – 0	Selangor
Rogers 45'

Selangor Club Field, Kuala Lumpur
Attendance: 8,000~10,000

== Winners ==
1924 Malaya Cup Winner

Singapore
Third Title
