= 1922 Malaya Cup =

Piala Malaya

Tournament details
- Country: Malaya
- Teams: 7

Final positions
- Champions: Selangor (1st title)
- Runner-up: Singapore

Tournament statistics
- Matches played: 11
- Goals scored: 33 (3 per match)

Malaya Cup was a tournament held annually by a Malaya Cup committee. This is the second season of Malaya Cup (later known as Malaysia Cup). It were contested by states in Malaya. The final were contested by the southern and northern champions in their respective conference round. Seven states sent their teams, an addition of one from previous tournament. The final were held at Selangor Club Field on 2 September 1922 where Selangor avenged their defeat against Singapore in a rematch of last year final with scoreline 3–2.

== Conference Round ==
Seven teams participated the second edition of the Malaya Cup, Johor, Malacca, Negeri Sembilan, Singapore, Penang, Selangor and Perak. The teams were divided into two conference, the Northern Section and Southern Section. The Northern Section comprises Penang, Selangor and Perak while Southern Section represented by Johor, Negeri Sembilan, Malacca and Singapore. Each team will play with each other (two games per team) and the winners of each conference will play in the final. Each win will give the team 2 points while losing will give 0 points. A draw means a point were shared between two teams.

=== Northern Section ===
| Team | Pld | W | D | L | GF | GA | GD | Pts |
|---|---|---|---|---|---|---|---|---|
| Selangor | 2 | 1 | 1 | 0 | 4 | 2 | +2 | 3 |
| Penang | 2 | 1 | 1 | 0 | 5 | 3 | +2 | 3 |
| Perak | 2 | 0 | 0 | 2 | 1 | 5 | -4 | 0 |

July 29, 1922
| Selangor | 2–0 | Perak |
August 12, 1922
| Penang | 2–2 | Selangor |
August 19, 1922
| Penang | 3–1 | Perak |

Selangor and Penang have an additional playoff match to decide who will face Southern Section champions on the tournament final.

==== Northern Section playoff ====
26 August 1922

| Selangor | 2 – 0 | Penang |

Ipoh, Perak

=== Southern Section ===
| Team | Pld | W | D | L | GF | GA | GD | Pts |
|---|---|---|---|---|---|---|---|---|
| Singapore | 3 | 3 | 0 | 0 | 9 | 2 | +7 | 6 |
| Malacca | 3 | 1 | 1 | 1 | 4 | 4 | 0 | 3 |
| Negeri Sembilan | 3 | 1 | 1 | 1 | 2 | 4 | -2 | 3 |
| Johor | 3 | 0 | 0 | 3 | 1 | 6 | -5 | 0 |

July 8, 1922
| Johor | 1–3 | Singapore |
July 15, 1922
| Negeri Sembilan | 1–0 | Johor |
July 29, 1922
| Negeri Sembilan | 1–1 | Malacca |
August 5, 1922
| Johor | 0–2 | Malacca |
August 12, 1922
| Malacca | 1–3 | Singapore |
August 19, 1922
| Singapore | 3–0 | Negeri Sembilan |

== Final ==
The final were held at Selangor Club Field on 2 September 1922. The match was a rematch of last year's final, with Selangor avenged their defeat with 3–2 win over Singapore.

2 September 1922

| Selangor | 3 – 2 | Singapore |
|---|---|---|
| De Souza 10,25'; Meow Chong 20' | | Jamieson 3'; Yong Liang 12' |

Selangor Club Field, Kuala Lumpur

== Winners ==
1922 Malaya Cup Winner

Selangor

First Title
