= 1921 Malaya Cup =

Piala Malaya

Tournament details
- Country: Malaya
- Teams: 6

Final positions
- Champions: Singapore FA (1st title)
- Runner-up: Selangor FA

Tournament statistics
- Matches played: 7
- Goals scored: 26 (3.71 per match)

Malaya Cup was an association football tournament held by a Malaya Cup committee. The inaugural tournament was run by the Selangor Club.

This is the first season of Malaya Cup (later known as Malaysia Cup). It was contested by states in Malaya. The final was contested by the southern and northern champions in their respective conference round. The final was held at Selangor Club Padang on 1 October 1921 where the southern champ, Singapore FA defeated the northern champ, Selangor FA with 2–1 scoreline.

== History ==
In January 1921, the British Royal Navy battleship H. M. S. Malaya called at Port Swettenham (now Port Klang), Singapore, Malacca, Penang and Port Dickson. During its stay, the crew competed in friendly matches in football, rugby, hockey, sailing, and golf against local clubs.

Three months later, the Chief Secretary of the Federated Malay States government received a letter from Captain H. T. Buller of the H. M. S. Malaya, which offered two cups to be competed for in football and rugby as tokens of their gratitude for the reception they received in Malaya. The offer was accepted and various club representatives met to organise the tournament.

A Malaya Cup committee was set up and it was decided to run the football competition in northern and southern sections.

== Conference Round ==
Six teams participated the inaugural Malaya Cup, Malacca, Negeri Sembilan, Singapore, Penang, Selangor and Perak. The teams were divided into two conference, the Northern Section and Southern Section. The Northern Section comprises Penang, Selangor and Perak, while Southern Section represented by Negeri Sembilan, Malacca and Singapore. Each team will play with each other (two games per team) and the winners of each conference will play in the final. Each win will give the team 2 points while losing will give 0 points. A draw means a point were shared between two teams.

The first Malaya Cup match was played on 20 August 1921, with Selangor defeating Penang 5–1 in front of an estimated crowd of 5,000 in Kuala Lumpur. Singapore played their first match on 10 September, coming out 4-0 victors against Negri Sembilan at the Negri Sembilan Club.

=== Northern Section ===
Team	Pld	W	D	L	GF	GA	GD	Pts
Selangor	2	2	0	0	7	2	+5	4
Perak	1	0	0	1	1	2	-1	0
Penang	1	0	0	1	1	5	-4	0

August 20, 1921
Selangor	5–1	Penang
August 27, 1921
Perak	1–2	Selangor
September 3, 1921
Perak	-	Penang *

*	Not played due to Penang unable to raise a team.

=== Southern Section ===
Team	Pld	W	D	L	GF	GA	GD	Pts
Singapore	2	2	0	0	6	0	+6	4
Negeri Sembilan	2	1	0	1	5	7	-2	2
Malacca	2	0	0	2	3	7	-4	0

September 10, 1921
Negeri Sembilan	0–4	Singapore
September 17, 1921
Malacca	3–5	Negeri Sembilan
September 24, 1921
Singapore	2–0	Malacca

== Final ==
Singapore and Selangor topped their respective sections, and met in the first Malaya Cup final on 1 October at the Selangor Club field (now Merdeka Square). Singapore won the match 2–1, and the Singapore players each received a gold badge for their victory. The match were historic as it marked the start of Singapore-Selangor rivalry.

1 October 1921

Selangor	1 – 2	Singapore
Rozario ?'		Jamieson 25'; Moss 55'

Selangor Club Padang, Kuala Lumpur

== Winners ==
1921 Malaya Cup Winner

Singapore
First Title
