= Klang Valley derby =

Football match

- Logo of Selangor FA and Kuala Lumpur FA
- Location: (Malaysia) Klang Valley
- Teams: Selangor FA; Kuala Lumpur FA
- First meeting: 2 March 1986
- Latest meeting: 12 January 2025; Selangor 1-0 Kuala Lumpur; 2024-25 Malaysia Super League
- Next meeting: TBD
- Stadiums: Shah Alam Stadium; Merdeka Stadium; KLFA Stadium; Petaling Jaya Stadium

Statistics
- Total meetings: 80
- Most wins: Selangor FA (46 wins)
- Top scorer: Azman Adnan (13)
- All-time series: Selangor: 46; Drawn: 16; Kuala Lumpur: 18
- Largest victory: Selangor 5-0 Kuala Lumpur (2001)
- Longest win streak: 10 games (Selangor)

Klang Valley derby is the name given to football matches that involves Selangor and Kuala Lumpur. Both of them were located in the Klang Valley, Malaysia.

== History ==
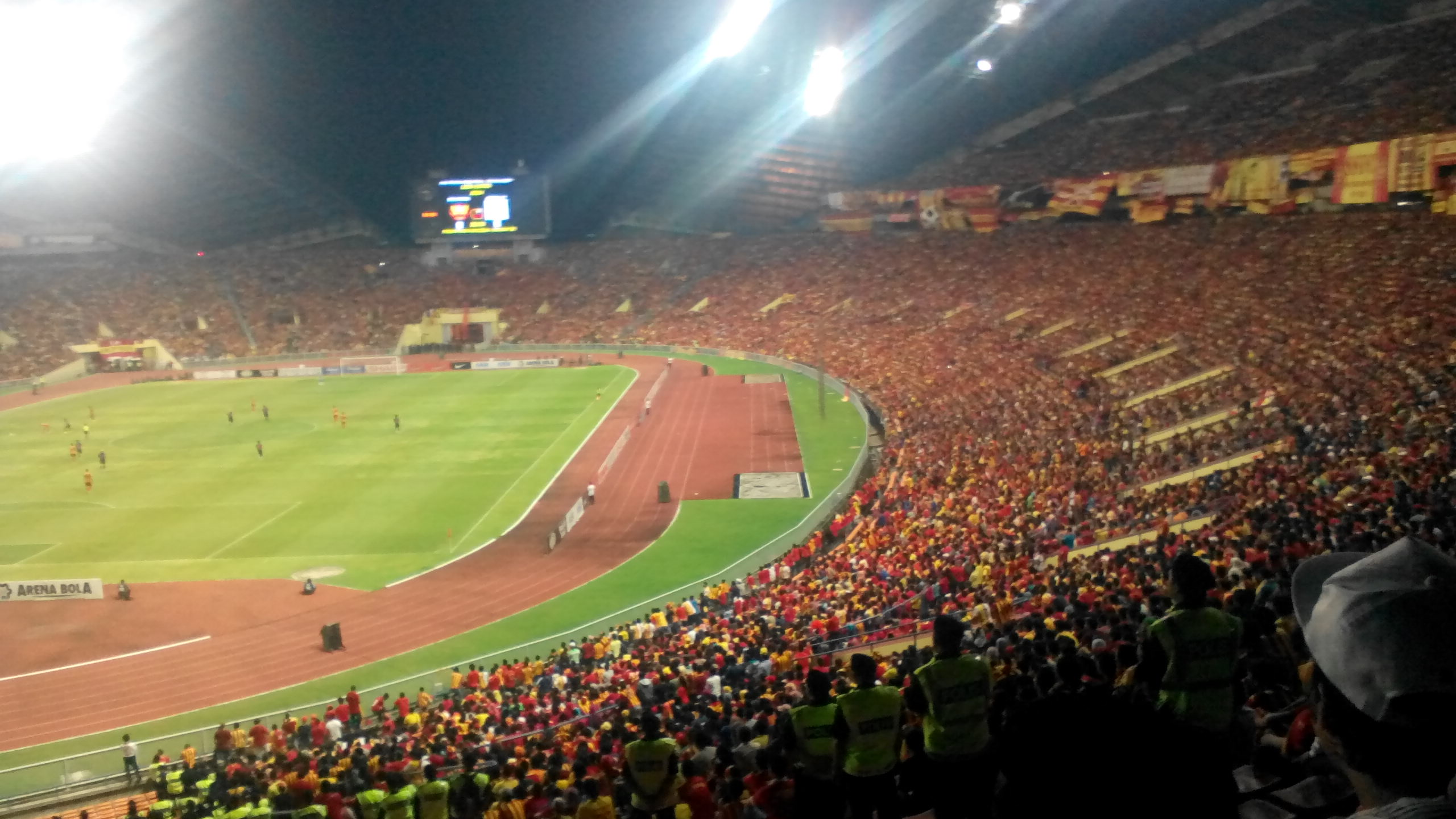
Selangor fans.

The rivalry can be seen as a result of the teams' geographical locations – the federal territory of Kuala Lumpur, the capital of Malaysia, is an enclave of Selangor – Kuala Lumpur was part of the latter until 1974, when it was carved out on 1 February that year and made directly responsible to the Malaysian government. The rivalry between the two teams, which were both located in the Klang Valley, dates back to at least the 1980s. The rivalry peaked when Kuala Lumpur FA was promoted to the Malaysia Super League after a seven-year spell in the second division. WPKL was then relegated back to the Premier League in 2011 after the last meeting of the two clubs. While Selangor FA remained one of the strongest clubs, having consistently stayed in the Super League, the Federal Territory declined even further, slipping as low as into the FAM League, the third division for the 2014 season. Since 2018, Kuala Lumpur City competes in the Malaysia Super League, the first division league after 3 years in the Premier League.

=== Selangor ===
Selangor Association Football League (AFL) was formed in 1905. In 1926, association officials formed a breakaway association called Selangor Football Association (SFA). Dispute between the AFL and the SFA continued for almost ten years before the two sides returned to the negotiating table for the betterment of football. Both groups merged on 22 February 1936, forming the present-day Selangor FA.

Selangor FA is the most successful club in Malaysia, in terms of overall titles won. Domestically, Selangor FA won a record 33 Malaysia Cup, 7 Malaysia Super League titles, 2 Malaysia Premier League titles, 7 Malaysia FAM League titles, 5 FA Cup, 8 Charity Shield, 4 Malaysia President Cup, 2 Malaysia Youth League titles, 13 King's Gold Cups and 1 Agong's Cup. Selangor FA have completed the treble in 1997, 2005 and 2009. In 1984 the treble covered the Malaysia Cup, League Champion and Charity Shield. Both 1997 and 2005 trebles covered the Domestic Cup Double (Malaysia Cup and FA Cup) while the 2009 treble covered the Double (Super League and FA Cup). 1997 was the most successful year for them as they won 4 trophies (Malaysia Cup, FA Cup, Charity Cup and King's Gold Cup) and runners-up for the Agong's Cup.

=== Kuala Lumpur ===
Kuala Lumpur Football Association is one of the youngest state football teams, having been formed in 1975, but their achievements during the short period made them veterans in the game. Formed as Federal Territory Football Association (FTFA), the association was actually a breakaway group from Selangor FA, following Kuala Lumpur's separation from Selangor to be a Federal Territory in 1974. Led by former F.A. of Selangor secretary K. Rasalingam together with other members Goh Ah Chai, Hamzah Muhammad, M.J. Vincent, Shariff Mustafa, Jeswant Singh and Manickarajah, they saw the need for another association in the Klang Valley due to the growing numbers of clubs.

FTFA was officially formed in 1975 with Tan Sri Hamzah Abu Samah elected as their first president. It was in 1979, that the Federal Territory made their debut in the Malaysia Cup. They then started off as whipping boys but by 1982 were already making waves to be among the top teams in the league although they failed to win any titles. In 1985, Federal Territory reached their first Malaysia Cup final after only competing in the tournament for seven seasons while other states, who have been in the competition since it was inaugurated in 1921, are still trying to reach the final. FTFA officially changed its name to Kuala Lumpur Football Association (KLFA) in 1987 to better identify itself with the city. Kuala Lumpur joined the ranks of the heavyweights in the Malaysian soccer competition which saw them win the Charity Shield once (1987) in the four appearances, the League twice and the Malaysia Cup three consecutive seasons (1987 to 1989). Later years saw lean pickings for Kuala Lumpur although they did win the FA Cup three times in 1993, 1994 and 1999, which remains Kuala Lumpur's last major trophy. Unlike their neighbour, Kuala Lumpur have a roller coaster ride jumping between third tier FAM League and first tier Super League.

The Klang Valley Derby, contested between Selangor FA and Kuala Lumpur FA, is among the most one-sided rivalries in Malaysian football, with Selangor overwhelmingly dominant. Kuala Lumpur have a winless drought for 11 years between 2007 till 2018. The derby celebrated its 70th derby on 2011.

The derby has also been contested twice in the Piala Sumbangsih, in 1987 and 1990, with Selangor emerging victorious on both occasions.

== List of Matches ==
From 1986 to current

#	Date	Tournament	Home team	Score	Away team
1	2 March 1986	1986 Malaysia Cup	Kuala Lumpur	1-0	Selangor
2	10 June 1987	1987 Malaysia Charity Shield	Kuala Lumpur	0-1	Selangor
3	15 August 1987	1987 Malaysia Cup	Kuala Lumpur	2-0	Selangor
4	14 August 1988	1988 Malaysia Cup	Kuala Lumpur	2-1	Selangor
5	25 October 1988	1988 Malaysia Cup	Kuala Lumpur	1-2	Selangor
6	28 October 1988	1988 Malaysia Cup	Kuala Lumpur	4-2	Selangor
7	1 July 1989	1989 Malaysia Semi-Pro League	Kuala Lumpur	3-0	Selangor
8	8 October 1989	1989 Malaysia Semi-Pro League	Kuala Lumpur	0-1	Selangor
9	1 May 1990	1990 Malaysia Charity Shield	Kuala Lumpur	0-0 aet,pso (3-0)	Selangor
10	23 June 1990	1990 Malaysia Semi-Pro League	Kuala Lumpur	0-1	Selangor
11	1 September 1990	1990 Malaysia Semi-Pro League	Kuala Lumpur	2-4	Selangor
12	11 May 1991	1991 Malaysia Semi-Pro League	Kuala Lumpur	2-2	Selangor
13	27 July 1991	1991 Malaysia Semi-Pro League	Kuala Lumpur	0-0	Selangor
14	18 September 1991	1991 Malaysia FA Cup	Kuala Lumpur	1-4	Selangor
15	25 September 1991	1991 Malaysia FA Cup	Kuala Lumpur	2-4	Selangor
16	20 June 1992	1992 Malaysia Semi-Pro League	Kuala Lumpur	1-0	Selangor
17	22 August 1992	1992 Malaysia Semi-Pro League	Kuala Lumpur	2-1	Selangor
18	23 May 1993	1993 Malaysia FA Cup	Kuala Lumpur	0-2	Selangor
19	29 May 1993	1993 Malaysia FA Cup	Kuala Lumpur	4-2	Selangor
20	2 June 1993	1993 Malaysia FA Cup	Kuala Lumpur	1-0	Selangor
21	18 May 1994	1994 Malaysia Premier League 1	Kuala Lumpur	3-2	Selangor
22	9 August 1994	1994 Malaysia Premier League 1	Selangor	1-0	Kuala Lumpur
23	15 March 1995	1995 Malaysia FA Cup	Selangor	2-1	Kuala Lumpur
24	29 April 1995	1995 Malaysia Premier League 1	Selangor	3-2	Kuala Lumpur
25	1 July 1995	1991 Malaysia Premier League 1	Kuala Lumpur	1-1	Selangor
26	25 March 1996	1996 Malaysia Premier League 1	Kuala Lumpur	0-1	Selangor
27	16 July 1996	1996 Malaysia Premier League 1	Selangor	1-1	Kuala Lumpur
28	15 April 1997	1997 Malaysia Premier League 1	Kuala Lumpur	0-1	Selangor
29	19 July 1997	1997 Malaysia Premier League 1	Selangor	0-0	Kuala Lumpur
30	28 October 1997	1997 Malaysia Cup	Selangor	2-0	Kuala Lumpur
31	18 November 1997	1997 Malaysia Cup	Kuala Lumpur	0-2	Selangor
32	25 April 1998	1998 Malaysia Premier League 1	Selangor	4-1	Kuala Lumpur
33	23 June 1998	1998 Malaysia Cup	Kuala Lumpur	2-0	Selangor
34	4 July 1998	1998 Malaysia Premier League 1	Kuala Lumpur	2-0	Selangor
35	7 July 1998	1998 Malaysia Cup	Selangor	4-2	Kuala Lumpur
36	26 March 2000	2000 Malaysia FA Cup	Kuala Lumpur	1-1	Selangor
37	1 April 2000	2000 Malaysia FA Cup	Selangor	0-1	Kuala Lumpur
38	13 March 2000	2000 Malaysia Premier League 1	Kuala Lumpur	2-3	Selangor
39	18 July 2000	2000 Malaysia Premier League 1	Selangor	4-2	Kuala Lumpur
40	8 March 2001	2001 Malaysia Premier League 1	Selangor	5-0	Kuala Lumpur
41	7 August 2001	2001 Malaysia Premier League 1	Kuala Lumpur	1-1	Selangor
42	22 September 2001	2001 Malaysia Cup	Kuala Lumpur	0-2	Selangor
43	9 October 2001	2001 Malaysia Cup	Selangor	3-2	Kuala Lumpur
44	2 March 2003	2002 Malaysia Premier League 1	Selangor	2-0	Kuala Lumpur
45	15 June 2002	2002 Malaysia Premier League 1	Kuala Lumpur	1-3	Selangor
46	15 September 2004	2004 Malaysia Cup	Kuala Lumpur	1-2	Selangor
47	29 September 2004	2004 Malaysia Cup	Selangor	3-1	Kuala Lumpur
48	20 February 2005	2005 Malaysia Premier League Division 2	Kuala Lumpur	1-4	Selangor
49	27 April 2005	2005 Malaysia Premier League Division 2	Selangor	4-3	Kuala Lumpur
50	18 June 2005	2005 Malaysia Premier League Division 2	Selangor	3-1	Kuala Lumpur
51	17 February 2007	2007 Malaysia Cup	Selangor	2-1	Kuala Lumpur
52	21 April 2007	2007 Malaysia Cup	Kuala Lumpur	3-1	Selangor
53	21 February 2009	2009 Malaysia FA Cup	Kuala Lumpur	0-1	Selangor
54	24 February 2009	2009 Malaysia FA Cup	Selangor	1-1	Kuala Lumpur
55	12 January 2010	2010 Malaysia Super League	Selangor	4-1	Kuala Lumpur
56	18 May 2010	2010 Malaysia Super League	Kuala Lumpur	2-4	Selangor
57	12 February 2011	2011 Malaysia Super League	Selangor	1-1	Kuala Lumpur
58	3 May 2011	2011 Malaysia Super League	Kuala Lumpur	1-3	Selangor
59	13 September 2011	2011 Malaysia Cup	Kuala Lumpur	0-0	Selangor
60	27 September 2011	2011 Malaysia Cup	Selangor	2-1	Kuala Lumpur
61	17 March 2012	2012 Malaysia Super League	Selangor	3-0	Kuala Lumpur
62	7 July 2012	2012 Malaysia Super League	Kuala Lumpur	0-4	Selangor
63	12 July 2016	2016 Malaysia Cup	Selangor	1-0	Kuala Lumpur
64	20 August 2016	2016 Malaysia Cup	Kuala Lumpur	1-1	Selangor
65	4 February 2018	2018 Malaysia Super League	Kuala Lumpur	0-2	Selangor
66	7 April 2018	2018 Malaysia FA Cup	Kuala Lumpur	0-3	Selangor
67	21 April 2018	2018 Malaysia FA Cup	Selangor	0-3	Kuala Lumpur
68	15 July 2018	2018 Malaysia Super League	Selangor	3-3	Kuala Lumpur
69	10 March 2019	2019 Malaysia Super League	Kuala Lumpur	2-3	Selangor
70	15 June 2019	2019 Malaysia Super League	Selangor	2-1	Kuala Lumpur
71	13 March 2021	2021 Malaysia Super League	Selangor	1-1	Kuala Lumpur
72	24 July 2021	2021 Malaysia Super League	Kuala Lumpur	1-1	Selangor
73	14 November 2021	2021 Malaysia Cup	Selangor	0-2	Kuala Lumpur
74	18 November 2021	2021 Malaysia Cup	Kuala Lumpur	1-0	Selangor
75	4 March 2022	2022 Malaysia Super League	Kuala Lumpur	3-3	Selangor
76	20 July 2022	2022 Malaysia Super League	Selangor	1-1	Kuala Lumpur
77	31 March 2023	2023 Malaysia Super League	Kuala Lumpur	1-3	Selangor
78	8 August 2023	2023 Malaysia Super League	Selangor	2-0	Kuala Lumpur
79	14 July 2024	2024–25 Malaysia Super League	Kuala Lumpur	1-0	Selangor
80	12 January 2025	2024–25 Malaysia Super League	Selangor	1-0	Kuala Lumpur

*From 1986 till 1993, Merdeka Stadium is a natural ground. It is noted as Kuala Lumpur ground to ease the listing of matches.

== Statistics ==
From 1986 to current

	Matches	Wins		Draws	Goals		Home wins		Home draws		Away wins	
	Matches	Selangor	Kuala Lumpur	Draws	Selangor	Kuala Lumpur	Selangor	Kuala Lumpur	Selangor	Kuala Lumpur	Selangor	Kuala Lumpur
Malaysia Semi-Pro League	8	3	3	2	9	10	0	3	0	2	3	0
Malaysia Premier League 1	16	10	2	4	32	16	6	2	2	2	4	0
Malaysia Premier League Division 2	3	3	0	0	11	5	2	0	0	0	1	0
Malaysia Super League	16	11	1	6	41	22	5	1	4	3	5	0
Malaysia Cup	21	11	8	2	30	27	7	7	0	2	4	1
Malaysia FA Cup	12	6	4	2	22	16	1	2	1	1	5	2
Piala Sumbangsih	2	2	0	0	1	0	0	0	0	0	2	0
All competitions	80	46	18	16	146	96	21	15	7	9	24	3

Last updated: 13 January 2024

== Honors ==
Team	League				Cup				Grand Total
Team	Malaysia Super League	Malaysia Premier League	Malaysia FAM League	League Total	Malaysia Cup	Malaysia FA Cup	Sultan Haji Ahmad Shah Cup	Cup Total	Grand Total
Selangor F.C.	6	2	7	15	33	5	8	45	60
Kuala Lumpur City F.C.	2	1	0	3	4	3	3	9	13

== See also ==
- East Coast Derby
- Malayan El'Clasico
- North-South Rivalry
- List of association football rivalries
- List of sports rivalries
