= 2023 Malaysia Super League =

Malaysian football season

Liga Super Malaysia
- Season: 2023
- Dates: 24 February – 17 December
- Champions: Johor Darul Ta'zim; 10th Super League title 10th Liga M title
- Relegated: Kelantan
- AFC Champions League Elite: Johor Darul Ta'zim
- AFC Champions League Two: Selangor
- Matches: 182
- Goals: 625 (3.43 per match)
- Top goalscorer: Ayron del Valle (23 goals)
- Best goalkeeper: Syihan Hazmi (Johor Darul Ta'zim)
- Biggest home win: 8 goals (Perak 8–0 Kelantan) (28 October); Johor Darul Ta'zim 8–0 Penang (16 December)
- Biggest away win: 9 goals (Kelantan 2–11 Selangor) (25 August)
- Highest scoring: 13 goals (Kelantan 2–11 Selangor) (25 August)
- Longest winning run: 20 matches (Johor Darul Ta'zim)
- Longest unbeaten run: 26 matches (Johor Darul Ta'zim)
- Longest winless run: 18 matches (Kuching City)
- Longest losing run: 11 matches Kelantan
- Highest attendance: 33,169 (Johor Darul Ta'zim 8–0 Penang) (16 December)
- Lowest attendance: 73 (Kelantan United 0–4 Negeri Sembilan) (1 December)
- Total attendance: 970,383
- Average attendance: 5,331

The 2023 Malaysia Super League (Malay: Liga Super Malaysia 2023) was the 20th season of the Malaysia Super League, the top-tier professional football league in Malaysia since its establishment in 2004, and the 42nd season of top-flight Malaysian football overall.

It is the first season after restructuring, with 18 teams (instead of 12). However, MFL announced there will be only 16 teams as they rejected both Sarawak United and Melaka United due to failed licensing appeal. The league shrunk to 15 teams after Petaling Jaya City officially withdrawn due to the expansion and increased foreign player quota, which are diverted from the club's main vision. On 5 January 2023, UiTM officially withdrawn due to the financial problems. The new season therefore has 14 teams, kicking-off on 24 February.

The defending champion from the previous season is Johor Darul Ta'zim.

== Teams ==
=== Team changes ===
The following teams have changed division since the 2022 season.

=== To Malaysia Super League ===
Promoted from the Premier League

- Kelantan
- Kuching City
- Kelantan United
- PDRM
- Perak

=== From Malaysia Super League ===
Expelled from the 2023 Malaysia Super League

- Melaka United^{^{1}}
- Sarawak United^{^{1}}

Withdrawn

- Petaling Jaya City^{^{2}}
- UiTM FC^{^{2}}

Notes:

^1 Failed to appeal licensing
^2Restructured of Malaysia Super League are not aligned with club's future vision

== Stadium and locations ==
Team	Location	Stadium	Capacity
Johor Darul Ta'zim	Iskandar Puteri	Sultan Ibrahim Stadium	40,000
Kedah Darul Aman	Alor Setar	Darul Aman Stadium	24,644
Kelantan	Kota Bharu	Sultan Muhammad IV Stadium	22,000
Kelantan United	Kota Bharu	Sultan Muhammad IV Stadium	22,000
Kuala Lumpur City	Cheras	Kuala Lumpur Stadium	18,000
Kuching City	Kuching	Sarawak State Stadium	26,000
Negeri Sembilan	Seremban	Tuanku Abdul Rahman Stadium	45,000
PDRM	Petaling Jaya	Petaling Jaya Stadium	25,000
Penang	George Town	City Stadium	20,000
Perak	Ipoh	Perak Stadium	42,500
Sabah	Kota Kinabalu	Likas Stadium	22,000
Selangor	Petaling Jaya	Petaling Jaya Stadium	25,000
Sri Pahang	Kuantan	Darul Makmur Stadium	40,000
Terengganu	Kuala Terengganu	Sultan Mizan Zainal Abidin Stadium	50,000

Locations of teams in the 2023 Malaysia Super League

== Personnel, kit and sponsoring ==
Team	Head coach	Captain	Kit manufacturer	Main sponsor
Johor Darul Ta'zim	(Argentina) Esteban Solari	(Indonesia) Jordi Amat	Nike	JDT Fan Token
Kedah Darul Aman	(Malaysia) Nafuzi Zain	(Philippines) Manny Ott	Lotto	Bin Zayed International, Langkawi Pure
Kelantan	(Argentina) Angel Alfredo Vera	(Malaysia) Yusri Yuhasmadi	93 Sports	Skygear, Hotel Zamburger
Kelantan United	(Malaysia) Nazrulerwan Makmor (interim)	(Malaysia) Indra Putra	IAM	Kelantan Melangkah ke Hadapan, Nasken Coffee
Kuala Lumpur City	(Croatia) Nenad Bacina	(Malaysia) Paulo Josué	Li-Ning	Rinani
Kuching City	(Singapore) Aidil Sharin Sahak	(Malaysia) Adam Shreen	StarSports	City of Unity
Negeri Sembilan	(Malaysia) K. Devan	(Malaysia) Zaquan Adha	Kelme	Visit Negeri Sembilan, Matrix
PDRM	(Malaysia) Yunus Alif	(Malaysia) Amir Saiful	Oren Sport	redONE
Penang	(Malaysia) Akmal Rizal (interim)	(Brazil) Rafael Vitor	Kaki Jersi	Penang2030
Perak	(Malaysia) Yusri Che Lah	(Argentina) Luciano Guaycochea	Cheetah	XOX
Sabah	(Malaysia) Ong Kim Swee	(South Korea) Park Tae-soo	Lotto	Sawit Kinabalu
Selangor	(Malaysia) Tan Cheng Hoe	(Malaysia) Brendan Gan	Joma	PKNS, MBI
Sri Pahang	(Singapore) Fandi Ahmad	(Malaysia) Ezequiel Agüero	HakkaClo	Invest Pahang
Terengganu	(Croatia) Tomislav Steinbruckner	(Bahrain) Habib Haroon	Umbro	Colever

=== Coaching changes ===
Note: Flags indicate national team as has been defined under FIFA eligibility rules. Players may hold more than one non-FIFA nationality.

Team	Outgoing coach	Manner of departure	Date of vacancy	Position in table	Incoming coach	Date of appointment
Perak	(Malaysia) Yusri Che Lah	Re-designate as Reserve team coach	13 September 2022	Pre-season	(Malaysia) Lim Teong Kim	13 September 2022
Terengganu	(Malaysia) Nafuzi Zain	End of Contract	30 November 2022	Pre-season	(Croatia) Tomislav Steinbruckner	1 December 2022
Johor Darul Ta'zim	(Venezuela) Héctor Bidoglio	Re-designate as Technical Director	1 December 2022	Pre-season	(Argentina) Esteban Solari	1 January 2023
Kelantan	(Malaysia) Rezal Zambery Yahya	Re-designate as Assistant Coach	1 December 2022	Pre-season	(South Korea) Choi Moon-sik	12 January 2023
Kelantan United	(Malaysia) Sazami Shafii (interim)	End of Interim	1 December 2022	Pre-season	(Czech Republic) Tomáš Trucha	30 December 2022
Kedah	(Malaysia) Victor Andrag (interim)	End of Interim	6 December 2022	Pre-season	(Malaysia) Nafuzi Zain	6 December 2022
PDRM	(Malaysia) Razak Jaamadi (interim)	End of Interim	31 December 2022	Pre-season	(Malaysia) Azzmi Aziz	7 January 2023
Sri Pahang	(Malaysia) Dollah Salleh (interim)	End of Interim	13 January 2023	Pre-season	(Singapore) Fandi Ahmad	14 January 2023
Penang	(Malaysia) Manzoor Azwira (interim)	End of Interim and Re-designate as Assistant Coach	23 February 2023	Pre-season	(Malaysia) Chong Yee Fatt	28 February 2023
Kelantan	(South Korea) Choi Moon-sik	Sacked	4 April 2023	11	(Malaysia) Rezal Zambery Yahya (interim)	4 April 2023
Kelantan	(Malaysia) Rezal Zambery Yahya (interim)	End of Interim	9 April 2023	13	(Germany) Frank Bernhardt	9 April 2023
Kelantan United	(Czech Republic) Tomáš Trucha	Re-designate as Reserve team coach	8 April 2023	14	(Malaysia) Nazrulerwan Makmor (interim)	8 April 2023
Perak	(Malaysia) Lim Teong Kim	Sacked	25 May 2023	11	(Malaysia) Yusri Che Lah (interim)	25 May 2023
Kelantan United	(Malaysia) Nazrulerwan Makmor (interim)	End of Interim	15 June 2023	13	(Brazil) Ailton Silva	15 June 2023
PDRM	(Malaysia) Azzmi Aziz	Sacked	20 June 2023	8	(Malaysia) Eddy Gapil (interim)	21 June 2023
Kelantan	(Germany) Frank Bernhardt	Sacked	21 June 2023	14	(Argentina) Angel Alfredo Vera	21 June 2023
Kuching City	(Malaysia) Irfan Bakti	Resigned	18 July 2023	13	(Malaysia) Firdaus Morshidi (interim)	18 July 2023
Kuala Lumpur City	(Croatia) Bojan Hodak	Resigned	26 July 2023	7	(Croatia) Miroslav Kuljanac (interim)	26 July 2023
Kuching City	(Malaysia) Firdaus Morshidi (interim)	End of Interim	2 August 2023	13	(Singapore) Aidil Sharin Sahak	2 August 2023
Kuala Lumpur City	(Croatia) Miroslav Kuljanac (interim)	End of Interim	4 August 2023	6	(Croatia) Nenad Bacina	4 August 2023
PDRM	(Malaysia) Eddy Gapil (interim)	End of Interim	5 August 2023	8	(Malaysia) Yunus Alif	5 August 2023
Perak	(Malaysia) Yusri Che Lah (interim)	End of Interim	12 October 2023	11	Himself	12 October 2023
Penang	(Malaysia) Chong Yee Fatt	Sacked	7 November 2023	11	(Malaysia) Akmal Rizal (interim)	7 November 2023
Kelantan United	(Brazil) Ailton Silva	Mutual Consent	20 November 2023	12	(Malaysia) Nazrulerwan Makmor (interim)	20 November 2023

== Standings ==
=== League table ===
Pos	Team	Pld	W	D	L	GF	GA	GD	Pts	Qualification or relegation
1	Johor Darul Ta'zim (C)	26	25	1	0	100	7	+93	76	Qualification for the AFC Champions League Elite league stage
2	Selangor	26	20	1	5	72	22	+50	61	Qualification for the AFC Champions League Two group stage (Note: Since the winners of the 2023 Malaysia FA Cup (Johor Darul Ta'zim) qualified for Asian competition based on their league positions, the berths awarded to the 2nd-placed team in the league.)
3	Sabah	26	17	3	6	64	33	+31	54	
4	Kedah Darul Aman	26	17	2	7	52	29	+23	53	
5	Sri Pahang	26	13	6	7	44	33	+11	45	
6	Terengganu	26	11	7	8	45	34	+11	40	Qualification for the AFF Shopee Cup group stage (Note: Qualified as the 2023 Malaysia Cup & 2023 Malaysia FA Cup runner-up.)
7	Kuala Lumpur City	26	10	8	8	44	39	+5	38	Qualification for the AFF Shopee Cup group stage
8	PDRM	26	11	4	11	35	37	−2	37	
9	Negeri Sembilan	26	6	9	11	33	49	−16	27	
10	Penang	26	6	6	14	29	50	−21	24	
11	Perak	26	6	4	16	25	55	−30	22	
12	Kelantan United	26	4	5	17	29	65	−36	17	
13	Kuching City	26	2	6	18	24	51	−27	12	
14	Kelantan (Note: MFL officially snubs Kelantan club licensing approval.)	26	2	2	22	29	121	−92	8	Ejected from Malaysian Super League

Source: MFL
Rules for classification: 1) Points; 2) Goal difference; 3) Number of goals scored.
(C) Champions

=== Position by round ===
Team ╲ Round	1	2	3	4	5	6	7	8	9	10	11	12	13	14	15	16	17	18	19	20	21	22	23	24	25	26
Johor Darul Ta'zim	3	3	1	1	1	1	1	1	1	1	1	1	1	1	1	1	1	1	1	1	1	1	1	1	1	1
Selangor	5	2	3	3	4	4	3	2	2	2	2	2	2	2	2	2	2	2	2	2	2	2	2	2	2	2
Sabah	1	1	2	2	2	3	5	5	4	4	5	4	5	5	5	5	5	5	5	4	4	4	4	4	4	3
Kedah Darul Aman	2	4	4	4	3	2	2	4	5	5	4	5	4	3	4	4	3	3	3	3	3	3	3	3	3	4
Sri Pahang	9	5	5	5	5	5	4	3	3	3	3	3	3	4	3	3	4	4	4	5	5	5	5	5	5	5
Terengganu	12	13	14	7	9	8	6	6	6	8	8	7	7	7	6	6	6	7	6	6	6	6	6	6	6	6
Kuala Lumpur City	6	9	10	12	11	12	9	8	7	6	6	6	6	6	7	7	7	6	7	7	7	7	7	7	7	7
PDRM	14	11	6	8	6	6	7	7	10	10	10	10	9	8	8	8	8	8	8	8	8	8	8	8	8	8
Negeri Sembilan	8	8	12	13	8	7	8	9	9	9	7	8	8	9	9	10	9	9	9	9	9	9	9	9	9	9
Penang	7	7	9	11	13	9	10	10	8	7	9	9	10	10	10	9	10	10	10	10	10	10	10	10	10	10
Perak	13	10	11	6	7	10	11	11	11	11	11	11	11	11	11	11	11	11	11	11	11	11	11	11	11	11
Kelantan United	11	12	13	14	14	14	14	14	14	14	14	14	12	13	13	12	13	12	12	12	12	12	12	12	12	12
Kuching City	4	6	8	10	12	13	12	12	12	12	12	12	13	12	12	13	12	13	13	13	13	13	13	13	13	13
Kelantan	10	14	7	9	10	11	13	13	13	13	13	13	14	14	14	14	14	14	14	14	14	14	14	14	14	14

Leader & Qualification for AFC Champions League Elite
Qualification for AFC Champions League Two

Source: MFL

== Results ==
=== Results table ===
Home \ Away	JDT	KDA	KEL	KLU	KLC	KUC	NSE	PDRM	PEN	PRK	SAB	SEL	SRP	TER
Johor Darul Ta'zim		6–0	5–1	6–0	6–1	2–0	2–0	4–0	8–0	5–0	4–0	2–0	2–0	2–0
Kedah Darul Aman	3–3		5–0	3–1	2–3	3–0	3–0	0–1	1–0	3–0	2–1	0–1	2–0	1–0
Kelantan	0–5	1–6		2–6	2–2	1–2	2–0	1–4	2–0	2–3	0–7	2–11	0–5	0–8
Kelantan United	0–2	2–3	4–1		1–3	2–1	0–4	2–2	1–0	0–0	0–3	1–7	1–5	1–4
Kuala Lumpur City	0–3	0–1	5–1	3–0		1–1	1–1	3–0	2–2	1–0	2–0	1–3	0–0	3–3
Kuching City	0–4	0–1	2–2	1–1	2–3		1–1	0–1	0–0	1–2	1–2	0–5	0–1	0–2
Negeri Sembilan	0–7	1–2	4–2	3–3	2–1	1–4		2–0	1–1	0–1	1–1	0–4	1–1	2–1
PDRM	0–1	0–2	7–2	2–0	2–0	1–1	1–2		3–0	0–0	1–0	1–0	1–2	0–0
Penang	0–2	1–2	4–3	2–0	1–1	2–1	0–0	4–2		3–1	1–2	1–2	3–2	1–1
Perak	0–5	1–4	8–0	1–1	0–4	2–0	1–1	1–2	3–1		0–1	0–4	0–3	0–3
Sabah	1–5	2–0	6–1	3–1	3–2	4–3	3–1	4–0	5–2	3–1		2–1	4–0	2–2
Selangor	0–4	3–2	3–0	1–0	2–0	2–1	2–1	3–1	3–0	4–0	1–0		1–1	5–1
Sri Pahang	0–2	1–1	4–1	1–0	1–2	3–2	4–3	2–3	1–0	1–0	1–1	1–0		2–2
Terengganu	1–3	1–0	5–0	2–1	0–0	2–0	1–1	1–0	1–0	3–0	0–4	0–4	1–2	

Updated to match(es) played on 17 December 2023. Source: MFL
Legend: Blue = home team win; Yellow = draw; Red = away team win.
For upcoming matches, an "a" indicates there is an article about the rivalry between the two participants.

=== Results by round ===
Team ╲ Round	1	2	3	4	5	6	7	8	9	10	11	12	13	14	15	16	17	18	19	20	21	22	23	24	25	26
Johor Darul Ta’zim	W	W	W	W	W	W	W	W	W	W	W	W	W	W	W	W	W	W	W	W	D	W	W	W	W	W
Selangor	W	W	D	W	L	W	W	W	W	L	W	W	L	W	W	L	W	W	L	W	W	W	W	W	W	W
Kedah Darul Aman	L	W	W	W	D	W	W	W	W	W	L	W	W	L	W	W	L	L	W	D	W	W	L	W	W	L
Sabah	W	W	W	D	W	L	L	D	W	W	D	W	L	L	W	W	W	L	W	L	W	W	W	W	W	W
Sri Pahang	D	W	D	D	W	D	W	W	W	W	L	W	L	W	W	W	L	W	L	W	W	D	L	L	L	D
Terengganu	L	L	D	W	L	W	W	W	L	L	D	W	W	L	W	D	D	D	W	W	W	L	D	L	D	W
Kuala Lumpur City	D	L	D	D	L	W	W	W	W	L	D	W	W	D	L	D	D	W	L	L	W	L	L	W	W	D
PDRM	D	L	W	L	W	W	L	L	L	L	L	W	W	W	W	L	D	D	W	L	D	W	W	L	W	L
Negeri Sembilan	D	D	L	W	W	L	D	D	L	W	W	D	D	L	D	L	D	D	L	L	L	L	L	W	W	L
Penang	D	D	L	L	L	W	L	W	W	W	L	L	L	D	D	W	L	L	L	L	L	L	D	W	D	L
Perak	L	D	D	W	L	L	L	L	D	W	L	L	L	L	L	D	W	L	W	L	L	W	W	L	L	L
Kelantan United	L	L	D	L	L	L	D	L	L	L	L	D	W	L	L	D	L	D	L	L	W	W	L	L	L	W
Kuching City	W	L	L	L	L	L	D	L	L	L	L	D	D	L	L	L	D	L	L	L	L	D	D	L	L	W
Kelantan	L	L	L	L	L	L	W	L	L	D	L	L	L	L	L	L	L	L	L	L	D	L	W	L	L	L

Updated to match(es) played on 17 December 2023. Source: MFL
W = Win; D = Draw; L = Lose

== Season statistics ==
- First goal of the season: 4 minutes 36 seconds
  - (Spain) Juan Muniz for Johor Darul Ta’zim (H) against Terengganu (24 February 2023)
- Fastest goal in a match: 2 minutes 9 seconds
  - (South Korea) Park Tae-Soo for Sabah (H) against Penang (17 March 2023)
- Latest goal in a match: 90 + 11 minutes 51 seconds
  - (Malaysia) Rizal Ghazali for Sabah (H) against Penang (17 March 2023)
- Oldest goalscorer in a match: 41 years 5 months 28 days
  - (Malaysia) Indra Putra Mahayuddin for Kelantan United (A) against Sabah (1 March 2023)

=== Top goalscorers ===
As of 17 December 2023

Rank	Player	Club	Goals
1	(Colombia) Ayron del Valle	Selangor	23
2	(Brazil) Bergson Da Silva	Johor Darul Ta'zim	21
3	(Italy) Fernando Forestieri	Johor Darul Ta'zim	19
4	(Liberia) Abu Kamara	Kuching City	13
5	(Malaysia) Arif Aiman Hanapi	Johor Darul Ta'zim	12
5	(Liberia) Kpah Sherman	Sri Pahang	12
5	(Bahrain) Ifedayo Olusegun	Kedah Darul Aman	12
5	(Malaysia) Faisal Halim	Selangor	12
9	(Croatia) Ivan Mamut	Terengganu	11
9	(Brazil) Paulo Josué	Kuala Lumpur City	11
11	(Japan) Bruno Suzuki	PDRM	10
11	(Argentina) Stefano Brundo	Sri Pahang	10

=== Own goals ===
As of 27 August 2023

Rank	Player	Team	Against	Date	Goal
1	(Nigeria) James Okwuosa	PDRM	Penang	9 April 2023	2
1	(Nigeria) James Okwuosa	PDRM	Perak	23 June 2023	2
2	(Colombia) Romel Morales	Kuala Lumpur City	Johor Darul Ta'zim	1 March 2023	1
2	(Malaysia) Kenny Pallraj	Kuala Lumpur City	Kelantan	17 March 2023	1
2	(Malaysia) Hasnul Zaim	Perak	Johor Darul Ta'zim	4 April 2023	1
2	(Malaysia) Shivan Pillay	Perak	Kelantan	28 April 2023	1
2	(Malaysia) Yusri Yuhasmadi	Kelantan	Perak	28 April 2023	1

=== Top assists ===
As of 12 December 2023

Rank	Player	Club	Assist
1	(Malaysia) Arif Aiman Hanapi	Johor Darul Ta'zim	11
2	(Argentina) Manuel Hidalgo	Kedah Darul Aman	10
3	(Venezuela) Yohandry Orozco	Selangor	9
4	(Indonesia) Saddil Ramdani	Sabah	8
4	(Malaysia) Brendan Gan	Selangor	8
6	(Italy) Fernando Forestieri	Johor Darul Ta'zim	7
6	(Liberia) Kpah Sherman	Sri Pahang	7
6	(Malaysia) Faisal Halim	Selangor	7
9	(Argentina) Leandro Velázquez	Johor Darul Ta'zim	6
9	(Malaysia) Rizal Ghazali	Sabah	6

=== Hat-trick ===
As of 16 December 2023

Player	For	Against	Result	Date
(Brazil) Bergson	Johor Darul Ta'zim	Kelantan United	6–0 (H)	13 May 2023
(Colombia) Ayron del Valle	Selangor	Kelantan United	1–7 (A)	7 June 2023
(Brazil) Diogo	Johor Darul Ta'zim	Kuala Lumpur City	6–1 (H)	3 July 2023
(Colombia) Romel Morales	Kuala Lumpur City	Kelantan	5–1 (H)	29 July 2023
(Brazil) Bergson	Johor Darul Ta'zim	Sabah	1–5 (A)	9 August 2023
(Croatia) Ivan Mamut	Terengganu	Kelantan	0–8 (A)	14 August 2023
(Colombia) Ayron del Valle	Selangor	Kelantan	2–11^{4} (A)	25 August 2023
(Ghana) Richmond Boakye	Selangor	Kelantan	2–11 (A)	25 August 2023
(Serbia) Luka Milunovic	Perak	Kelantan	8–0 (H)	28 October 2023
(Bahrain) Ifedayo Olusegun	Kedah Darul Aman	Kelantan	1–6 (A)	26 November 2023
(Japan) Bruno Suzuki	PDRM	Kelantan	7–2 (H)	10 December 2023
(Malaysia) Arif Aiman Hanapi	Johor Darul Ta'zim	Penang	8–0^{4} (H)	16 December 2023

Notes (H) – Home team (A) – Away team ^{4} – Player scored 4 goals

=== Clean Sheets ===
As of 12 December 2023

Rank	Player	Club	Clean sheets
1	(Malaysia) Syihan Hazmi	Johor Darul Ta'zim	19
2	(Malaysia) Kalamullah Al-Hafiz	Kedah Darul Aman	9
3	(Malaysia) Suhaimi Husin	Terengganu	8
4	(Malaysia) Ramadhan Hamid	PDRM	7
4	(Malaysia) Samuel Somerville	Selangor	7
6	(Malaysia) Khairul Fahmi Che Mat	Sabah	5
6	(Malaysia) Izham Tarmizi	Sri Pahang	5
8	(Malaysia) Khairul Azhan	Selangor	4
8	(Malaysia) Azri Ghani	Kuala Lumpur City	4
10	(Malaysia) Willfred Jabun	PDRM	3

=== Discipline ===
As of 27 August 2023

==== Players ====
- Most red cards:2
  - (Malaysia) Wan Amirul Afiq (Kedah Darul Aman)
  - (Australia) Giancarlo Gallifuoco (Kuala Lumpur City)
- Most yellow cards:8
  - (Jordan) Fadi Awad (PDRM)

==== Club ====
- Most red cards:4
  - Kedah Darul Aman
  - PDRM
  - Penang
- Most yellow cards:54
  - PDRM
- Fewest yellow cards:31
  - Johor Darul Ta'zim
  - Terengganu
- Fewest red cards:0
  - Johor Darul Ta'zim
  - Kuching City
  - Sabah
  - Selangor
  - Sri Pahang

== Attendances ==
=== Overall attendance ===
Highest Lowest

Home	Away														Attendance	
Home	JDT	KDA	KEL	KLU	KLC	KUC	NSE	PDRM	PEN	PRK	SAB	SEL	SRP	TER	Total	Average
Johor Darul Ta'zim	—N/a	13,722	24,404	10,833	11,961	8,441	13,344	12,666	33,169	11,622	19,836	22,526	14,684	31,889	229,097	17,623
Kedah Darul Aman	11,800	—N/a	3,320	5,926	2,590	7,662	1,397	12,792	3,230	7,320	9,741	20,864	4,114	21,700	112,456	8,650
Kelantan	2,500	81	—N/a	315	6,678	5,138	505	651	6,011	5,148	235	1,002	3,528	1,696	33,488	2,576
Kelantan United	697	1,954	2,910	—N/a	224	165	73	540	351	964	297	1,242	168	517	10,102	777
Kuala Lumpur City	6,847	2,068	1,037	397	—N/a	610	688	627	1,291	1,260	1,194	4,204	1,248	1,464	22,935	1,764
Kuching City	7,690	341	373	188	238	—N/a	325	292	387	640	2,500	18,000	275	248	31,497	2,423
Negeri Sembilan	15,427	2,348	1,885	1,114	452	941	—N/a	406	998	1,333	1,738	2,838	6,329	3,203	39,012	3,001
PDRM	1,705	2,596	187	202	149	190	153	—N/a	160	2,250	986	4,115	471	920	14,084	1,083
Penang	6,051	2,924	1,395	1,630	1,455	1,783	3,754	1,224	—N/a	3,540	2,434	4,919	927	1348	33,384	2,568
Perak	6,799	15,106	2,834	2,096	6,998	3,817	1,147	1,313	3,864	—N/a	2,781	6,391	5,855	1,917	60,918	4,686
Sabah	15,203	12,317	5,210	12,558	6,462	4,885	7,094	12,602	11,711	5,666	—N/a	14,444	8,022	12,096	128,270	9,867
Selangor	14,462	10,637	5,761	6,701	7,964	5,211	5,754	10,737	6,245	9,069	7,421	—N/a	8,504	5,207	103,673	7,975
Sri Pahang	5,693	7,296	6,040	2,811	4,804	1,617	2,877	755	3,196	4,100	10,027	7,066	—N/a	3,792	60,074	4,621
Terengganu	10,819	6,520	5,025	4,250	11,560	3,584	5,025	9,020	3,300	11,265	2,651	7,456	10,520	—N/a	90,995	7,000
Total League Attendance															969,985	5,330

Last Updated : 18 December 2023

Source : FAM CMS

== See also ==
- 2023 Piala Sumbangsih
- 2023 Malaysia M3 League
- 2023 Malaysia M4 League
- 2023 Malaysia M5 League
- 2023 Malaysia FA Cup
- 2023 Malaysia Cup
- 2023 MFL Challenge Cup
- 2023 MFL Cup
- 2023 Piala Presiden
