= Malaysia Cup =

Malaysian football tournament

- Founded: 20 August 1921; 105 years ago (as Malaya Cup)
- Region: Malaysia
- Teams: 16
- Current champions: Johor Darul Ta'zim (6th title)
- Most championships: Selangor (33 titles)
- Broadcaster(s): Astro Arena; RTM
- Website: malaysianfootballleague.com
- 2026 Malaysia Cup

The Malaysia Cup (Malay: Piala Malaysia), formerly known as Malaya Cup, is an annual football tournament in Malaysia, held at the end of the calendar year. The cup was first held in 1921. Despite its prestige and popularity as the country's oldest cup tournament, it does not guarantee a place in a continental competition, which is allocated to the Malaysia FA Cup winners. The competition was previously managed by the Football Association of Malaysia, before it was transferred to the Football Malaysia LLP (now known as the Malaysian Football League) in the 2016 season.

In the 2016 edition, the competition structure changed and only the top eleven teams of the Malaysia Super League and the top five teams of the Malaysia Premier League qualified for the cup.

The current title holder is Johor Darul Ta'zim, who won its sixth title in the 2026 edition.

== History ==
The Piala Malaysia is one of Asia's longest-running football competitions. Established in 1921, it was known as the Malaya Cup from 1921 to 1967, after the donation of a trophy from the British Royal Navy ship HMS Malaya. The tournament was renamed the Piala Malaysia in 1967. For much of its history, the Cup was contested by Malaysian state teams, military teams as well as foreign invitees Singapore and Brunei. Malaysian club teams were allowed entry into the competition from 2000.

=== Origins ===
In January 1921, the British Royal Navy battleship HMS Malaya visited Port Swettenham (now Port Klang), Singapore, Malacca, Penang and Port Dickson. During its stay, the crew competed in friendly matches in football, rugby, field hockey, sailing, and golf against local clubs.

Three months later, the Chief Secretary of the Federated Malay States government received a letter from Captain H. T. Buller of HMS Malaya, who, in gratitude for the reception they received in Malaya, offered two cup tournaments in football and rugby. The offer was accepted and various club representatives met to organise the tournament.

=== First tournament ===
A Malaya Cup committee was set up and it was decided to run the football competition in northern and southern sections. The first tournament were entrusted to be run by the Selangor Club. The first ever Malaya Cup match was played on 20 August 1921, with Selangor defeating Penang 5–1 in front of an estimated crowd of 5,000 in Kuala Lumpur. The inaugural tournament were played by six teams and won by Singapore where each Singapore players received a gold badge for their victory.

=== Pre-war years ===
The popularity of the tournament was already apparent in its early years; in 1923, a newspaper described it as "by far the greatest sporting event of the year". The final was played outside Kuala Lumpur for the first time in 1925, when Singapore defeated Selangor 2–1 at the Anson Road Stadium. Singapore also maintained a record of appearing in every Malaya Cup final from the first in 1921 to 1941, when the competition was disrupted by World War II.

In September 1926, representatives from the football associations of Selangor, Singapore, Perak, Negeri Sembilan and Malacca agreed to form a Malayan Football Association (MFA). The MFA was based in Kuala Lumpur, with John Sime of Singapore as its first president, and was represented on the Malaya Cup committee which organised the competition. The MFA saw little activity until 1932, when it was revived and reformed as the Football Association of Malaya (FAM). The FAM also took control of the organisation of the Malaya Cup from its founding committee. The same year, the British Services were allowed to enter their own teams, joining Kedah and Johor which were both in the competition by 1930.

=== Post-war era ===
The Malaya Cup resumed in 1948 and Negeri Sembilan won the cup for the first time after defeating Selangor 2–1 in the final, which was replayed after the first match ended in a draw. The east coast states such as Pahang, Kelantan, Terengganu and Perlis entered the competition for the first time. In 1957, the final was played for the first time at the newly constructed Merdeka Stadium. The majority of the finals would be held at the Merdeka Stadium until the 1990s.

In 1959, the Malaya Cup departed from the traditional one round tournament to a two-round home and away format in three zones, East, South and North.

In 1967, the Malaya Cup was retired and replaced with a new trophy, the Piala Malaysia, in line with political developments and since then the competition has been known as the Piala Malaysia. The old Malaya Cup now resides at the National Museum in Kuala Lumpur.

Where previous tournaments had been segmented into geographical zones, the 1979 edition saw every team play each other in a 17-team competition. New entries were Federal Territory (later renamed Kuala Lumpur), the East Malaysian states of Sabah and Sarawak, as well as the independent sultanate of Brunei. A one-round league competition was introduced in Malaysia in 1979. The top four teams at the end of the league will face off in two semi-finals before the winners made it to the finals. In 1981, the quarter-finals stage were introduced. When the league began, it was intended primarily as a qualifying tournament for the Piala Malaysia.

However, only in 1982, the league trophy was awarded to the winners of the league stage. Since then, the Piala Malaysia has been held after the conclusion of the league each year, with only the best-performing teams in the league qualifying for the Piala Malaysia.

=== Modern era ===
In 2003, MPPJ FC became the first club and a non state team to win the cup. Prior to that year, the two teams which made the final had always been representative sides of the regional Football Associations, or military teams.

Teams representing two of Malaysia's neighbouring countries have been involved in the competition. Brunei won the cup in 1999 and continue to be involved though in recent years they have been represented by the club side DPMM FC, whereas initially their team was organised by the Football Association of Brunei. Singapore used to enter a team organised by the Football Association of Singapore. Their team won the cup 24 times and are the second most successful side in the competition's history after Selangor. However, after their last win in 1994, Singapore withdrew from the competition following a dispute with the Football Association of Malaysia over gate receipts and have not been involved since. In 2011, the Football Association of Singapore announced that Singapore would be back to join the Piala Malaysia in 2012. On 5 December 2011, the Football Association of Singapore had unveiled the new squad list and line up planned for the 2012 edition of Piala Malaysia where LionsXII was sent to compete.

=== Privatisation era ===
In 2015, the Football Malaysia Limited Liability Partnership (FMLLP) was created in the course of privatisation of the Malaysian football league system. The partnership saw all 24 teams of Liga Super and Liga Premier including FAM as the Managing Partner and MP & Silva as a special partner (FAM's global media and commercial advisor) to become stakeholders in the company.

== List of finals ==
Below is a list of Malaysia Cup winners and finalists since its inception in 1921.

| Year | Winners | Runners-up | Score | Venue |
|---|---|---|---|---|
| 1921 | Singapore | Selangor | 2–1 | Selangor Club Padang, Kuala Lumpur |
| 1922 | Selangor | Singapore | 3–2 | Selangor Club Padang, Kuala Lumpur |
| 1923 | Singapore | Perak | 2–1 | Selangor Club Padang, Kuala Lumpur |
| 1924 | Singapore | Selangor | 1–0 | Selangor Club Padang, Kuala Lumpur |
| 1925 | Singapore | Selangor | 2–1 | Anson Road Stadium, Singapore |
| 1926 | Perak | Singapore | 1–0 | Selangor Club Padang, Kuala Lumpur |
| 1927 | Selangor | Singapore | 8–1 | Selangor Club Padang, Kuala Lumpur |
| 1928 | Selangor & Singapore (trophy shared) | | 2–2 | Selangor Club Padang, Kuala Lumpur |
| 1929 | Selangor & Singapore (trophy shared) | | 2–2 | Anson Road Stadium, Singapore |
| 1930 | Singapore | Selangor | 3–0 | Anson Road Stadium, Singapore |
| 1931 | Perak | Singapore | 3–1 | Kuala Lumpur Stadium, Kuala Lumpur |
| 1932 | Singapore | Selangor | 5–3 | Kuala Lumpur Stadium, Kuala Lumpur |
| 1933 | Singapore | Selangor | 8–2 | Anson Road Stadium, Singapore |
| 1934 | Singapore | Penang | 2–1 | Kuala Lumpur Stadium, Kuala Lumpur |
| 1935 | Selangor | Singapore | 3–2 | Kuala Lumpur Stadium, Kuala Lumpur |
| 1936 | Selangor | Singapore | 1–0 | Anson Road Stadium, Singapore |
| 1937 | Singapore | Selangor | 2–1 | Kuala Lumpur Stadium, Kuala Lumpur |
| 1938 | Selangor | Singapore | 1–0 | Anson Road Stadium, Singapore |
| 1939 | Singapore | Selangor | 3–2 | Kuala Lumpur Stadium, Kuala Lumpur |
| 1940 | Singapore | Kedah | 2–0 | Kuala Lumpur Stadium, Kuala Lumpur |
| 1941 | Singapore | Penang | 2–1 | Kuala Lumpur Stadium, Kuala Lumpur |
| 1942–1945 | Cancelled due to World War II – Japanese occupation of Malaya, Singapore and British Borneo | | | |
| 1946–1947 | Not held | | | |
| 1948 | Negeri Sembilan and Selangor (draw) | | 2–2 | Station Padang, Seremban |
| 1948 (replay) | Negeri Sembilan | Selangor | 2–1 | Victoria Institution, Kuala Lumpur |
| 1949 | Selangor | Army/Navy | 3–2 | Rifle Range Road, Kuala Lumpur |
| 1950 | Singapore | Penang | 2–0 | Rifle Range Road, Kuala Lumpur |
| 1951 | Singapore | Perak | 6–0 | Rifle Range Road, Kuala Lumpur |
| 1952 | Singapore | Penang | 3–2 | Chinese Assembly Hall, Ipoh |
| 1953 | Penang | Singapore | 3–2 | Chinese Assembly Hall, Ipoh |
| 1954 | Penang | Singapore | 3–0 | TPCA Princes Road Stadium, Kuala Lumpur |
| 1955 | Singapore | Kelantan | 3–1 | Jalan Besar Stadium, Singapore |
| 1956 | Selangor | Singapore | 2–1 | TPCA Princes Road Stadium, Kuala Lumpur |
| 1957 | Perak | Selangor | 3–2 | Stadium Merdeka, Kuala Lumpur |
| 1958 | Penang | Singapore | 3–3 (3–1 pen.) | Stadium Merdeka, Kuala Lumpur |
| 1959 | Selangor | Perak | 4–0 | Stadium Merdeka, Kuala Lumpur |
| 1960 | Singapore | Perak | 2–0 | Stadium Merdeka, Kuala Lumpur |
| 1961 | Selangor | Perak | 4–2 | Stadium Merdeka, Kuala Lumpur |
| 1962 | Selangor | Penang | 1–0 | Stadium Merdeka, Kuala Lumpur |
| 1963 | Selangor | Penang | 6–2 | Stadium Merdeka, Kuala Lumpur |
| 1964 | Singapore | Perak | 3–2 | Stadium Merdeka, Kuala Lumpur |
| 1965 | Singapore | Selangor | 3–1 | Stadium Merdeka, Kuala Lumpur |
| 1966 | Selangor | Malaysian Armed Forces | 1–0 | Stadium Merdeka, Kuala Lumpur |
| 1967 | Perak | Singapore | 2–1 | Stadium Merdeka, Kuala Lumpur |
| 1968 | Selangor | Penang | 8–1 | Stadium Merdeka, Kuala Lumpur |
| 1969 | Selangor | Penang | 1–0 | City Stadium, George Town |
| 1970 | Perak | Kelantan | 2–0 | Stadium Merdeka, Kuala Lumpur |
| 1971 | Selangor | Perak | 3–1 | Perak Stadium, Ipoh |
| 1972 | Selangor | Perak | 3–0 | Stadium Merdeka, Kuala Lumpur |
| 1973 | Selangor | Terengganu | 2–1 | Stadium Merdeka, Kuala Lumpur |
| 1974 | Penang | Perak | 2–1 | City Stadium, George Town |
| 1975 | Selangor | Singapore | 1–0 | Stadium Merdeka, Kuala Lumpur |
| 1976 | Selangor | Singapore | 3–0 | Stadium Merdeka, Kuala Lumpur |
| 1977 | Singapore | Penang | 3–2 | Stadium Merdeka, Kuala Lumpur |
| 1978 | Selangor | Singapore | 4–2 | Stadium Merdeka, Kuala Lumpur |
| 1979 | Selangor | Singapore | 2–0 | Stadium Merdeka, Kuala Lumpur |
| 1980 | Singapore | Selangor | 2–1 | Stadium Merdeka, Kuala Lumpur |
| 1981 | Selangor | Singapore | 4–0 | Stadium Merdeka, Kuala Lumpur |
| 1982 | Selangor | Terengganu | 1–0 | Stadium Merdeka, Kuala Lumpur |
| 1983 | Pahang | Selangor | 3–2 | Stadium Merdeka, Kuala Lumpur |
| 1984 | Selangor | Pahang | 3–1 | Stadium Merdeka, Kuala Lumpur |
| 1985 | Johor | Kuala Lumpur | 2–0 | Stadium Merdeka, Kuala Lumpur |
| 1986 | Selangor | Johor | 6–1 | Stadium Merdeka, Kuala Lumpur |
| 1987 | Kuala Lumpur | Kedah | 1–0 | Stadium Merdeka, Kuala Lumpur |
| 1988 | Kuala Lumpur | Kedah | 3–0 | Stadium Merdeka, Kuala Lumpur |
| 1989 | Kuala Lumpur | Kedah | 2–1 | Stadium Merdeka, Kuala Lumpur |
| 1990 | Kedah | Singapore | 3–1 | Stadium Merdeka, Kuala Lumpur |
| 1991 | Johor | Selangor | 3–1 | Stadium Merdeka, Kuala Lumpur |
| 1992 | Pahang | Kedah | 1–0 | Stadium Merdeka, Kuala Lumpur |
| 1993 | Kedah | Singapore | 2–0 | Stadium Merdeka, Kuala Lumpur |
| 1994 | Singapore | Pahang | 4–0 | Shah Alam Stadium, Shah Alam |
| 1995 | Selangor | Pahang | 1–0 | Shah Alam Stadium, Shah Alam |
| 1996 | Selangor | Sabah | 0–0 (5–4 pen.) | Shah Alam Stadium, Shah Alam |
| 1997 | Selangor | Pahang | 1–0 | Shah Alam Stadium, Shah Alam |
| 1998 | Perak | Terengganu | 1–1 (5–3 pen.) | Bukit Jalil National Stadium, Kuala Lumpur |
| 1999 | Brunei | Sarawak | 2–1 | Stadium Merdeka, Kuala Lumpur |
| 2000 | Perak | Negeri Sembilan | 2–0 | Shah Alam Stadium, Shah Alam |
| 2001 | Terengganu | Perak | 2–1 | Bukit Jalil National Stadium, Kuala Lumpur |
| 2002 | Selangor | Sabah | 1–0 | Bukit Jalil National Stadium, Kuala Lumpur |
| 2003 | MPPJ FC | Sabah | 3–0 | Bukit Jalil National Stadium, Kuala Lumpur |
| 2004 | Perlis | Kedah | 1–0 | Bukit Jalil National Stadium, Kuala Lumpur |
| 2005 | Selangor | Perlis | 3–0 | Bukit Jalil National Stadium, Kuala Lumpur |
| 2006 | Perlis | Negeri Sembilan | 2–1 | Bukit Jalil National Stadium, Kuala Lumpur |
| 2007 | Kedah | Perak | 3–0 | Bukit Jalil National Stadium, Kuala Lumpur |
| 2008 | Kedah | Selangor | 3–2 | Bukit Jalil National Stadium, Kuala Lumpur |
| 2009 | Negeri Sembilan | Kelantan | 3–1 | Bukit Jalil National Stadium, Kuala Lumpur |
| 2010 | Kelantan | Negeri Sembilan | 2–1 | Bukit Jalil National Stadium, Kuala Lumpur |
| 2011 | Negeri Sembilan | Terengganu | 2–1 | Shah Alam Stadium, Shah Alam |
| 2012 | Kelantan | ATM | 3–2 | Shah Alam Stadium, Shah Alam |
| 2013 | Pahang | Kelantan | 1–0 | Shah Alam Stadium, Shah Alam |
| 2014 | Pahang | Johor Darul Ta'zim | 2–2 (5–3 pen.) | Bukit Jalil National Stadium, Kuala Lumpur |
| 2015 | Selangor | Kedah | 2–0 | Shah Alam Stadium, Shah Alam |
| 2016 | Kedah | Selangor | 1–1 (6–5 pen.) | Shah Alam Stadium, Shah Alam |
| 2017 | Johor Darul Ta'zim | Kedah | 2–0 | Shah Alam Stadium, Shah Alam |
| 2018 | Perak | Terengganu | 3–3 (4–1 pen.) | Shah Alam Stadium, Shah Alam |
| 2019 | Johor Darul Ta'zim | Kedah | 3–0 | Bukit Jalil National Stadium, Kuala Lumpur |
| 2020 | Cancelled due to the COVID-19 pandemic in Malaysia | | | |
| 2021 | Kuala Lumpur City | Johor Darul Ta'zim | 2–0 | Bukit Jalil National Stadium, Kuala Lumpur |
| 2022 | Johor Darul Ta'zim | Selangor | 2–1 | Bukit Jalil National Stadium, Kuala Lumpur |
| 2023 | Johor Darul Ta'zim | Terengganu | 3–1 | Bukit Jalil National Stadium, Kuala Lumpur |
| 2024–25 | Johor Darul Ta'zim | Sri Pahang | 2–1 | Bukit Jalil National Stadium, Kuala Lumpur |
| 2026 | Johor Darul Ta'zim | Kuching City | 2–0 | Bukit Jalil National Stadium, Kuala Lumpur |

== Performance by clubs ==
Since its establishment, the Malaysia Cup has been won by 15 different teams. Teams shown in italics no longer exist or no longer compete in the competition.

| Rank | Team | Wins | Last final won | Runners-up | Last final lost | Total final appearances |
|---|---|---|---|---|---|---|
| 1 | Selangor | 33 | 2015 | 17 | 2022 | 50 |
| 2 | Singapore FA | 24 | 1994 | 19 | 1993 | 43 |
| 3 | Perak | 8 | 2018 | 11 | 2007 | 19 |
| 4 | Johor Darul Ta'zim | 6 | 2026 | 2 | 2021 | 8 |
| 5 | Kedah Darul Aman | 5 | 2016 | 9 | 2019 | 14 |
| 6 | Penang | 4 | 1974 | 9 | 1977 | 13 |
| 7 | Sri Pahang | 4 | 2014 | 5 | 2024–25 | 9 |
| 8 | Kuala Lumpur City | 4 | 2021 | 1 | 1985 | 5 |
| 9 | Negeri Sembilan | 3 | 2011 | 3 | 2010 | 6 |
| 10 | Kelantan | 2 | 2012 | 4 | 2013 | 6 |
| 11 | Perlis FA | 2 | 2006 | 1 | 2005 | 3 |
| 11 | Johor FA | 2 | 1991 | 1 | 1986 | 3 |
| 13 | Terengganu | 1 | 2001 | 6 | 2023 | 7 |
| 14 | MPPJ | 1 | 2003 | 0 | — | 1 |
| 14 | Brunei FA | 1 | 1999 | 0 | — | 1 |
| 16 | Armed Forces | 0 | — | 3 | 2012 | 3 |
| 16 | Sabah | 0 | — | 3 | 2003 | 3 |
| 18 | Sarawak FA | 0 | — | 1 | 1999 | 1 |
| 18 | Kuching City | 0 | — | 1 | 2026 | 1 |

== See also ==
- MFL Cup
- MFL Challenge Cup
- Piala Sumbangsih
- Piala Emas Raja-Raja
- Football in Malaysia
