= Royal Selangor Club =

Social club in Kuala Lumpur

Coordinates: 3°8′57″N 101°41′34″E

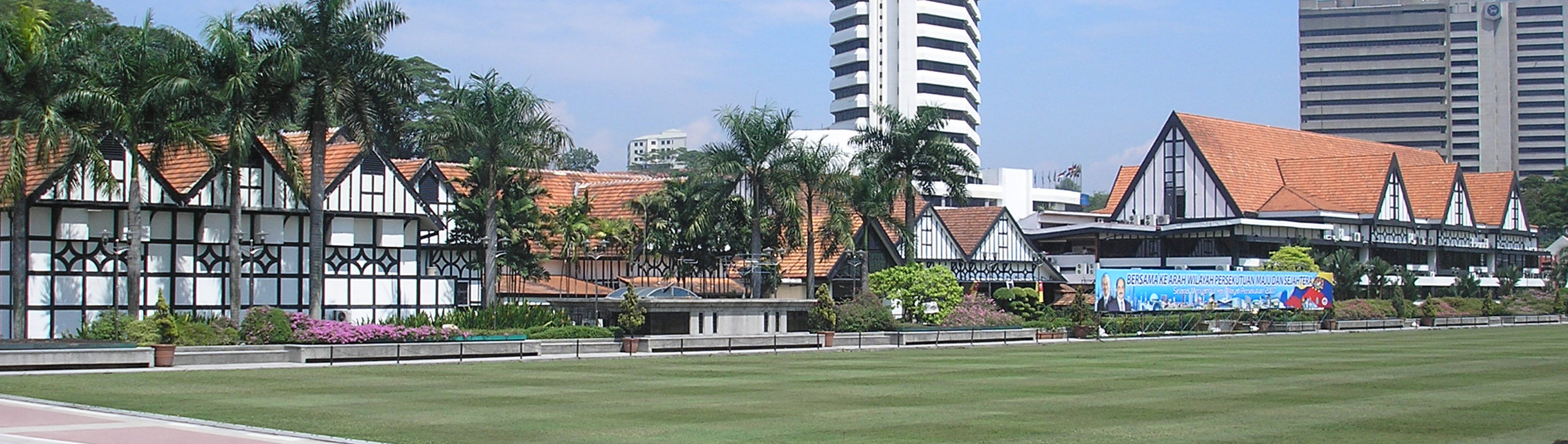
The older portion of the Royal Selangor Club building (center), as well as its more modern north wing (right) added after the club's 1970 fire, are primarily built in Mock Tudor stylings.

The Royal Selangor Club (Malay: Kelab Di-Raja Selangor) is a social club in Kuala Lumpur, Malaysia, founded in 1884 by the British who ruled Malaya at the time. The club is situated next to the Dataran Merdeka, or Independence Square, padang (field), and is accessible from Jalan Raja (King Road).

== History and overview ==
=== Establishment ===
The club was founded as the Selangor Club in 1884 as a meeting point for educated and high-ranking members of British colonial society. Most of its early members were British, the founding members include H.C. Syers, the Superintendent of Selangor State; A.R. Venning, Treasurer of Selangor and head of the Sanitation Board (who also created the Lake Gardens); A. C. Norman who designed some early buildings of Kuala Lumpur; and H.F. Bellamy who headed the Selangor Public Works Department. Nevertheless, membership to the club was primarily determined by high educational standard or social standing, rather than race or citizenship; for example an original founding member was Thamboosamy Pillay and its first Secretary was a German, Count Bernstorff. Count Bernstorff however left the club with an unexplained deficit of $1,100, and later Henry Huttenbach steadied the club's finances as Secretary. The club house was built with funds from the British colonial administration, and the British Resident of Selangor was ex officio the President of the club – the first three Presidents were John Pickersgill Rodger, William Edward Maxwell, and Frank Swettenham.

The club was initially based in a small wooden building with an attap roof near the north eastern corner of the padang. In 1890, this early building was replaced by a two-storey structure designed by the Government Architect A.C. Norman at the current site of the club on the west side of the padang. In 1910, the building was rebuilt using a design by architect Arthur Benison Hubback (notably credited with the design of the Kuala Lumpur Railway Station) in Mock Tudor styling, with two additional wings on either side of the main building.

The club was nicknamed "The Spotted Dog", one explanation is that it referred to its mixed community membership and began with a remark that "frequenters of The Spotted Dog pub must accept the company as they find it". Another suggestion it refers to two Dalmatians belonging to the wife of H. C. Syers, one of the club founders, that were left to guard the entrance of the club whenever they visited the club. Yet another suggestion is that the first emblem club was supposedly a spotted leopard that was so badly drawn that some mistook it for a dog. The club is also simply referred to as "The Dog".

Over the years, the club's membership increased and had also begun to include high-ranking Malaysian civil servants: judges, lawyers and important people in society. The club's proximity to the old High Courts at the other side of Dataran Merdeka has also made the club a popular meeting place for the legal fraternity.

=== Flooding and fire ===
The Royal Selangor Club was not spared from frequent flooding in Kuala Lumpur. Between the start of the 1910s and the 1930s, the club was recorded to be hit by floods in 1911, 1917, December 1925 and December 1926.

On 20 December 1970, the main section of the club was razed in a fire which was believed to have started in its kitchen at around 10.30 p.m. and was contained within an hour by 50 fire fighters (including 20 who were off-duty). Property damage from the fire was estimated at more than M$1.5 million, but there were no casualties. During the fire, guests of a children's Christmas party in the club were safely evacuated with "no panic". The then president of the club, Khir Johari, stated that the club was insured for M$1 million. Shortly after, another flood struck Kuala Lumpur and the club premises three days after the start of 1971.

While the club is more than 100 years old, much of its early records were lost during the three-year Japanese occupation of Malaya from 1942 to 1945, and the 1970 fire that damaged the club .

=== Rebuilding after the fire ===
After the fire, plans were made by the club to rebuild what was damaged. Proposals were made on a new wing and submitted to the Kuala Lumpur City Hall in 1972. However, City Hall was suggesting the construction of a civic center over the site of the club's field and club. The initial response by the club was to search for a new site in the surrounding area (including Jalan Duta, an area near the Houses of Parliament, an area near a polo club in Ampang, and Damansara) with little success. Discussions were eventually made with City Hall to agree on the club's rebuilding. As a result, plans for a civic center in the area were abandoned, and City Hall granted the reconstruction of the club's new building in July 1978. The new wing, which was built in a similar Mock Tudor style as the rest of the club building, was constructed between 5 November 1978 to December 1980 at a cost of M$6 million.

=== Sports and recreation ===
The club has organised various sporting activities since its early years, including cricket (where it has been a key player in the history of cricket in Malaysia). Rugby Union has been played at the Club since 1894.

Sign prohibiting women from bar

Sporting events at the club can be viewed from the Long Bar, a portion of the club which has been off limits to women, purportedly because men "would drink and get very excited when they watched the games and they didn't want the ladies to see their exuberant behaviour, hence it was decided to ban women visitors from the Long Bar". The ban was repealed by vote at an extraordinary general meeting in October 2023; the repeal required an amendment to the club's constitution, and thus will not take effect until the amendment is approved by the Registrar of Societies as required by the Societies Act 1966.

Members of the club are said to have introduced hash running in 1938. Legend has it that some members of the Selangor Club decided that it would be a good idea to run to work after heavy drinking the night before so they could rid themselves of their hangovers, which apparently they did. As the club was once also called Hash House (so named because some of its members thought its food unpalatable) the members therefore named themselves Hash House Harriers. During the World Interhash in 1998, an exception was made to allow women into the Long Bar.

=== Dataran Merdeka field ===
The field or padang fronting the Royal Selangor Club, now known as Dataran Merdeka, had long been used by the club but was leased from the Government under a "Temporary Occupation License - TOL" before it was taken back by the Kuala Lumpur City Hall in 1987 to be used specifically for events organised by City Hall. Throughout the time the field was used by the club, sporting activities such as cricket, rugby, hockey and football matches were held there almost on a daily basis. The club's loss of the field was compensated with a piece of land in Bukit Kiara, which is currently the site of the Royal Selangor Club Bukit Kiara Annexe.

== Recognition ==
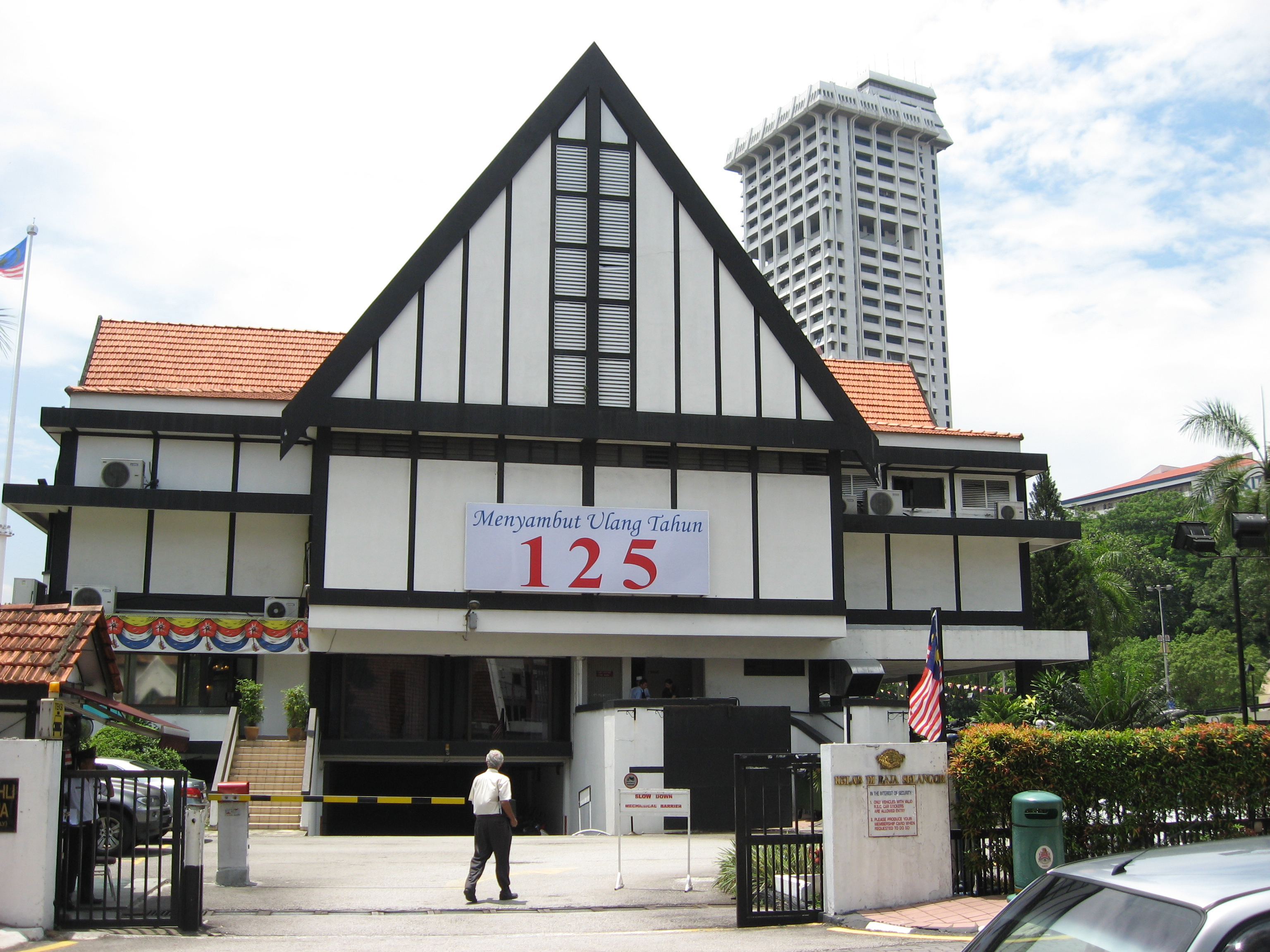
Entrance to the Royal Selangor Club on its 125th anniversary in 2009.

Effort has been made to accumulate support from various bodies to recognise the club as a national heritage building and institution, due to its intertwined link with the country's history.

The club is one of the oldest in the country, serving as a British institution, and is witness to the first hoisting of the Malayan flag in place of the Union Jack on the night of 30 August 1957 and declaration of independence by Tunku Abdul Rahman (to which club members broke into cheers of happiness), signifying the country's independence from the British. In 1984, the club was awarded a royal status under the patronage of the Sultan of Selangor, Sultan Salahuddin Abdul Aziz Shah, who has voiced his support for the club's preservation during its 100th anniversary celebration, stating that "This institution should remain forever."

== Royal Selangor Club Kiara Sport Annexe ==
The Royal Selangor Club Kiara Sport Annexe is a branch of the Royal Selangor Club built over a piece of land in Bukit Kiara 5.5 kilometres away from the original clubhouse, which was given as compensation after the original club's field was acquired by the Kuala Lumpur City Hall in 1987. The facility was officially opened on 7 June 1998 by then Yang di-Pertuan Agong Tuanku Jaafar. The annexe is laid out in a similar manner as the original club, with the main club building facing a large field and designed in a similar architectural style as the original club building. The annexe also includes a swimming pool at the rear of the building.

== Cricket ==
Royal Selangor Club
- Interactive map of Royal Selangor Club

Ground information
- Location: Kuala Lumpur, Malaysia
- Country: Malaysia

International information
- First women's T20I: 3 June 2018: Bangladesh v Sri Lanka
- Last women's T20I: 13 February 2024: Singapore v Thailand
- As of 13 February 2024; Source: ESPNcricinfo

In 1997, the ground held ten matches in the ICC Trophy. The following year it held five List A matches as part of the cricket competition at the 1998 Commonwealth Games. These matches saw Malaysia play Sri Lanka, Northern Ireland play South Africa, Malaysia play Zimbabwe, New Zealand play Scotland, and Barbados play South Africa. The Bukit Kiara ground was used for some matches at the 2008 Under-19 Cricket World Cup.

== See also ==
- Royal Selangor Golf Club
- Royal Selangor Flying Club
