= Singapore FA =

Singaporean football club

- Full name: Football Association of Singapore
- Nickname: The Lions
- Founded: 1921
- Dissolved: 1994
- Ground: Kallang Stadium
- Capacity: 85,000
- Website: www.fas.org.sg

Singapore FA was a representative team of the Football Association of Singapore in competitions run by the Football Association of Malaysia, separate from the Singapore national team. Despite its participaton in the Malaysia Cup ceasing in 1994, it is still by far the second most successful team, winning the tournament 24 times (only surpassed by its rival Selangor). Its derby with Selangor was known as the most North-South Rivalry.

== History ==
=== Pre-War to 1970s ===
The Singapore Amateur Football Association had participated in the Malaya (Malaysia) Cup since its inauguration in 1921 with a representative side. During the pre-war years, Singapore and Selangor were a dominant force and fierce rivals, winning the Cup 19 times between them. The post war years were also dominated by Singapore and Selangor up till 1970, where Selangor emerged as the dominant force in the Malaysia Cup with eleven Cup wins, compared to two victories by Singapore. However, the excitement of Cup during the 1970s attracted a full house at every Cup match played at the National Stadium. Fans often nicknamed the Singapore team "The Lions" since this period.

=== The 1980s and 1990s ===
Due to changes in the Malaysia Cup format in 1982, all teams participating in the Malaysia Cup now had to qualify by finishing within the top 8 positions in the Malaysian League, instead of gaining direct entry to the Cup as before. Singapore was excluded from the Malaysian League, and thus the Malaysia Cup, from 1982 to 1984.

During the Malaysian League's amateur years (1982 to 1988), Singapore was only allowed to participate from 1985 to 1988. By this time, Pahang, Kuala Lumpur, Kedah and Johor had emerged as serious contenders to the cup besides Selangor F.C.. Other teams within the League (KL, Pahang and Kedah) managed to sign key Singapore players like Fandi Ahmad, Malek Awab, K. Kannan and V. Sundramoorthy to boost their teams.

Although Singapore won the Malaysian League in 1985, and qualified for the Malaysia Cup every year from 1985 to 1988 (finishing second in the Malaysian League in 1986 and 1988, and third in 1987), they failed to reach the finals of the Malaysia Cup during this time.

When the Malaysian League was replaced by the Semi-Pro League in 1989, Singapore continued to participate. Singapore finished runners up in the league in 1990. In 1993, Singapore was relegated to Division 2, where they finished runners up.

=== 1990s ===
In 1990, Singapore finished runners-up to Selangor in Semi-Pro League 1 and reached the Malaysia Cup final. The team included emerging players such as Nazri Nasir, Hasnim Haron, D. Tokijan, Borhan Abu Samah, alongside Australian players Abbas Saad and Alistair Edwards.

Many fans expected the team to build on the success of 1990 in the following season but the failure to retain the services of players like Borhan Abu Samah, Abbas Saad and Alistair Edwards proved to be costly. The team did not qualify for the Malaysia Cup and was fighting to avoid relegation to Semi-Pro League 2 in 1991. Worse was to follow when the team was finally relegated to Semi-Pro League 2 after a very inconsistent and poor performances throughout the 1992 season.

Relegation proved to be the turning point for the Lions with a complete shake up of the team in 1993. Top local and key import players like Fandi, Malek, Kannan, Sundram, Jang Jung, Abbas Saad and Alistair Edwards, who were then playing for Malaysian teams all returning to help the Lions in their mission to regain their status in Semi-Pro League 1 and at the same time, mount a serious challenge to the Cup through qualification by finishing as one of the top two teams in League 2. This team, dubbed as the "Dream Team" did achieve its primary targets of promotion to Semi-Pro League 1 and mount a serious challenge to the Cup. However, the trophies still eluded them as this team finished second to Selangor in League 2 and runners up again to Kedah in the Cup.

Despite failure at the last hurdle in 1993, the Lions retained the services of key players like Abbas, Jang Jung, Malek and at the same time, introduced up and coming players like Steven Tan, Lee Man Hon and V. Selvaraj for the following season.

In 1994, the Semi-Pro League was replaced by the fully professional Malaysian Premier League.

With the right mix of experienced pros, young players and expert tactician in former Aston Villa/New Zealand defender Douglas Moore, this team won the Malaysian League and Cup double in 1994. The league was won after a long and hard battle with Kedah where both teams swapped top positions throughout the season with the key moment was the 2:0 win against Kedah in Kallang that finally sealed the title for the Lions. The Malaysia Cup was won with an emphatic 4:0 victory over Pahang at Shah Alam Stadium, with Abbas Saad scoring a hat-trick and Fandi rounding off the score.

However, at the height of winning the Cup, FAS had decided to withdraw the Lions from Malaysian competitions after the 1994 season following a dispute with the Football Association of Malaysia over gate receipts and concentrate its efforts on the development of local football. A significant consequence of this would have seen the bulk of the Singapore national team be without regular domestic football for a year, as it was estimated to take that long to put in place the structure of what would eventually become the S.League. So, the FAS decided to enter a team based around the Lions team in the FAS Premier League, which was then the top level of domestic football in Singapore, for the 1995 season, that would enable the national team squad to get regular games without having to find other clubs. This team went undefeated during the season, easily winning the last FAS Premier League title.

=== 2010s ===
In 2011, the Football Association of Singapore and the Football Association of Malaysia reached an agreement that would see greater co-operation between the two nations. With the under-23 players from the Young Lions as the base, the team was allowed five local players over the age of 23, as well as a number of overseas players (in accordance with the quota set out by the rules of the Malaysian competitions). This was the first time a Singapore team would participate in Malaysian domestic football since Singapore won the Malaysian League and Cup double in 1994.

The team, called the LionsXII, played in the Malaysian Super League and Malaysia Cup from 2012 to 2015. LionsXII were runners up in 2012, and champions in 2013.

== Seasons ==
=== Malaysia Cup ===
The preliminary group phase from 1921 to 1978, and the preliminary league phase from 1979 to 1988 was considered part of the Malaysia Cup proper and not as a stand-alone competition.

Season	Preliminary group/league phase									Knock-out phase
Season	Division	P	W	D	L	F	A	Pts	Pos	Knock-out phase
1921	MC-S	2	2	0	0	6	0	4	–	Winners
1922	MC-S	3	3	0	0	9	2	6	–	Runners-up
1923	MC-S	3	2	1	0	10	4	5	–	Winners
1924	MC-S	2	2	0	0	10	0	4	–	Winners
1925	MC-S	2	2	0	0	12	1	4	–	Winners
1926	MC-S	2	2	0	0	18	3	4	–	Runners-up
1927	MC-S	1	1	0	0	5	0	2	–	Runners-up
1928	MC-S	2	2	0	0	13	3	4	–	Winners
1929	MC-S	3	3	0	0	11	2	6	–	Winners
1930	MC-S	3	3	0	0	12	1	6	–	Winners
1931	MC-S	3	2	1	0	14	6	5	–	Runners-up
1932	MC-S	4	3	1	0	15	5	7	–	Winners
1933	MC-S	4	4	0	0	17	2	8	–	Winners
1934	MC-S	4	3	1	0	18	3	7	–	Winners
1935	MC-S	4	3	1	0	19	4	7	–	Runners-up
1936	MC-S	4	4	0	0	19	3	8	–	Runners-up
1937	MC-S	4	3	1	0	13	4	7	–	Winners
1938	MC-S	4	3	1	0	11	4	7	–	Runners-up
1939	MC-S	4	4	0	0	10	3	8	–	Winners
1940	MC-S	5	4	1	0	25	6	9	–	Winners
1941	MC-S	5	4	1	0	16	2	9	–	Winners
Competition suspended from 1942 to 1947 due to World War II.
1948	MC-S	5	2	2	1	11	6	6	–	(Note: Not group winners; did not qualify for finals.)
1949	MC-S	5	4	1	0	14	3	9	–	(Note: Lost group play-off; did not qualify for final.)
1950	MC-S	4	4	0	0	17	1	8	–	Winners
1951										Winners
1952	MC-S	4	4	0	0	13	3	8	–	Winners
1953	MC-S								–	Runners-up
1954	MC-S								–	Runners-up
1955	MC-S								–	Winners
1956	MC-S								–	Runners-up
1957	Did not participate.									
1958	MC-S	5	5	0	0	13	4	10	–	Runners-up
1959	MC-S	10	6	3	1	29	14	15	–	
1960	MC-S	10	10	0	0	38	10	20	–	Winners
1961	MC-S	10	7	2	1	45	21	16	–	
1962	MC-S	6	4	1	1	16	11	9	–	
1963	MC-S	14	12	0	2	65	15	24	–	SF
1964	MC-S								–	Winners
1965	MC-S								–	Winners
1966	MC-S								–	
1967	MC-S								–	Runners-up
1968	Did not participate.									
1969	Did not participate.									
1970	MC-S	6	5	0	1	15	6	10	–	SF
1971									–	(Note: Outside top 4 placed teams; did not qualify for semi-finals.)
1972	MC-S	6	4	1	1	21	5	9	–	
1973	MC-S	6	5	0	1	21	4	10	–	SF
1974	MC-S	12	8	0	4	19	12	16	–	SF
1975	MC-S	10	5	4	1	23	12	14	–	Runners-up
1976	MC-N	10	7	3	0	29	9	17	–	Runners-up
1977	MC-S	10	8	2	0	25	6	18	–	Winners
1978	MC-N	12	9	2	1	35	10	20	–	Runners-up
1979	MC	16	12	3	1	39	7	27	1st	Runners-up
1980	MC	16	10	3	3	32	10	23	3rd	Winners
1981	MC	16	11	4	1	37	6	26	1st	Runners-up
1982	Did not participate.									
1983	Did not participate.									
1984	Did not participate.									
1985	MC	15	11	2	2	27	6	35	1st	QF
1986	MC	15	12	0	3	42	10	36	2nd	SF
1987	MC	16	11	0	5	35	15	33	3rd	QF
1988	MC	16	9	6	1	31	5	33	2nd	QF

- From 1921 to 1950, the winners of the Northern and Southern sections play-off in the final.
- The Cup was shared between finalists Singapore and Selangor in 1928 and 1929.
- An Eastern zone was added from 1951.

=== Semi-professional era ===
The Malaysian Semi-Pro League, with two divisions, was inaugurated in 1989. The two divisions were merged into the Premier League in 1994.

Singapore's performance was as follows:

Season	League									Malaysia Cup
Season	Division	P	W	D	L	F	A	Pts	Pos	Malaysia Cup
1989	SP1									
1990	SP1									Runners-up
1991	SP1									
1992	SP1	18	4	5	9	21	24	13	9th	(Note: Final league position outside top 8; did not qualify for Malaysia Cup.)
1993	SP2								2nd	Runners-up
1994	PL								1st	Winners

Key

- P = Played
- W = Games won
- D = Games drawn
- L = Games lost
- F = Goals for
- A = Goals against
- Pts = Points
- Pos = Final position
- MC-N = Malaysia Cup Northern Section/Zone
- MC-S = Malaysia Cup Southern Section/Zone
- MC = Malaysia Cup League Stage
- SP1 = Semi-Pro League Division One
- SP2 = Semi-Pro League Division Two
- PL = Malaysia Premier League
- QF = Quarter-finals
- SF = Semi-finals

Champions	Runners-up	Promoted	Relegated

== Honours ==
- Malaysia Cup: 24
  - 1921, 1923, 1924, 1925, 1928 (shared), 1929 (shared), 1930, 1932, 1933, 1934, 1937, 1939, 1940, 1941, 1950, 1951, 1952, 1955, 1960, 1964, 1965, 1977, 1980, 1994
- Malaysia League/ Malaysia Premier League: 2
  - 1985, 1994
- Sultan Haji Ahmad Shah Cup: 1
  - 1989
- FAM Cup Winners (Tier 3): 2
  - 1963, 1967
- FAS Premier League (semi-pro): 1
  - 1995

== See also ==
- LionsXII
