= 2025–26 Melaka F.C. season =

Melaka
2025–26 season
- President: Datuk Wira Nur Azmi Ahmad
- CEO: Muhammad Najmi Mohd Nordin
- Head coach: K. Devan (until 25 December); Subramaniam Sooryapparad (caretaker; 26 December – 28 December); E. Elavarasan (from 8 January)
- Stadium: Hang Jebat Stadium
- Malaysia Super League: 11th of 13
- Malaysia FA Cup: Round of 16
- Malaysia Cup: Quarter-finals
- Top goalscorer: League: Juan Douglas; Dino Kalesic (4 goals); All: Juan Douglas; Ahmed Shamsaldin; Dino Kalesic (4 goals)
Home colours	Away colours

The 2025–26 season is the third season in the history of Melaka F.C., and the club's first season in Malaysia Super League. In addition to the domestic league, the team will participate in the Malaysia FA Cup and the Malaysia Cup.

== Coaching staff ==
As of 1 August 2025

Position	Name
Head coach	(Malaysia) E. Elavarasan
Assistant coach	(Malaysia) Mohd Asri Hj. Ninggal (Malaysia) S. Subramaniam
Goalkeeper coach	(Malaysia) Mazlan Wahid
Fitness coach	(Malaysia) Mohd Zahidibudiman Ibrahim
Team Doctor	(Malaysia) Dr Fakhrizzaki Shamsul Baharain
Physio	(Malaysia) Fakhrusy Syakirin Yaacob
Team coordinator	(Malaysia) Al Qayyum Azlan Farhan
Media officer	(Malaysia) Iz'aan Firdaus Mohd Sufian Chin
Team analyst	(Malaysia) Muhammad Fadhlin Adam
Masseur	(Malaysia) Muhammad Afif Mohd Derus
Kitman	(Malaysia) Ahmad Shukri Othman

== Players ==
As of 31 January 2026

Note: Flags indicate national team as defined under FIFA eligibility rules; some limited exceptions apply. Players may hold more than one non-FIFA nationality.

No.	Pos.	Nation	Player
1	GK	MAS	Samuel Somerville (on loan from Selangor)
2	DF	MAS	Che Rashid
3	DF	PHI	Simen Lyngbø
4	MF	MAS	Nasir Basharudin (captain)
6	MF	MAS	Faiz Mazlan
7	MF	MAS	Aiman Danish (on loan from JDT II)
10	FW	MAS	Shahrel Fikri
12	FW	MAS	Azim Rahim
16	MF	NGA	Michael Ozor
17	DF	MAS	Irfan Zakaria
18	DF	MAS	Aroon Kumar
19	MF	MAS	G. Durrkeswaran
20	MF	BIH	Dino Kalesic
23	GK	MAS	Haziq Aiman (on loan from JDT II)
24	DF	MNE	Argzim Redžović

No.	Pos.	Nation	Player
25	DF	MAS	Khairul Anwar Shahrudin
26	MF	MAS	Umar Hakeem (on loan from JDT II)
27	DF	MAS	Hafiz Mohd Johar
28	MF	MAS	Fahmi Faizal
29	FW	MAS	Afeeq Iqmal
31	GK	MAS	Firdaus Irman
33	DF	CIV	Noel Agbre
37	DF	KOR	Dae-yeob Gu
42	DF	MAS	Zulkhairi Zulkeply
68	MF	MAS	V. Ruventhiran
80	MF	MAS	Nizaruddin Jazi
88	MF	KOR	Do Dong-hyun
89	DF	MAS	Mahalli Jasuli
91	MF	KOR	Park Kwang-il
99	FW	EGY	Ahmed Shamsaldin

== Transfers ==
=== In ===
Preseason

No.	Pos.	Player	Transferred from	Fee	Date	Source
10	FW	(Malaysia) Shahrel Fikri	(Malaysia) PDRM	Free	3 July 2025	
17	DF	(Malaysia) Irfan Zakaria	(Malaysia) Kedah Darul Aman	Free	3 July 2025	
2	DF	(Malaysia) Che Rashid	(Malaysia) Negeri Sembilan	Free	8 July 2025	
31	GK	(Malaysia) Firdaus Irman	(Malaysia) Perak	Free	9 July 2025	
18	DF	(Malaysia) Aroon Kumar	(Malaysia) Negeri Sembilan	Free	15 July 2025	
29	FW	(Malaysia) Afeeq Iqmal	(Malaysia) Kedah Darul Aman	Free	15 July 2025	
6	FW	(Malaysia) Faiz Mazlan	(Malaysia) KL Rovers	Free	16 July 2025	
26	MF	(Malaysia) Umar Hakeem	(Malaysia) Johor Darul Ta'zim II	on loan	16 July 2025	
23	GK	(Malaysia) Haziq Aiman	(Malaysia) Johor Darul Ta'zim II	on loan	16 July 2025	
7	MF	(Malaysia) Aiman Danish	(Malaysia) Johor Darul Ta'zim II	on loan	16 July 2025	
8	MF	(Brazil) Patrick Gama	(Vietnam) Thể Công – Viettel	Free	16 July 2025	
33	FW	(Brazil) Anderson Brito	(Brazil) Independência	Free	1 Aug 2025	
9	FW	(Brazil) Juan Douglas	(Brazil) Independência	Free	1 Aug 2025	
5	DF	(Brazil) Vitor Carvalho	(Brazil) Grêmio Esportivo Glória	Free	1 Aug 2025	
3	DF	(Philippines) Charles Dabao	(Philippines) Dynamic Herb Cebu	Free	1 Aug 2025	
1	GK	(Philippines) Jun Badelic	(Philippines) Dynamic Herb Cebu	Free	1 Aug 2025	
22	FW	(Brazil) Danilo Magalhães	(Brazil) Atlético Monte Azul	Free	1 Aug 2025	
37	DF	(South Korea) Dae-yeob Gu	(South Korea) Gyeongju KHNP	Free	1 Aug 2025	
77	MF	(Philippines) Justin Baas	(Thailand) Uthai Thani	Free		
11	FW	(Ghana) Bernard Arthur	(Saudi Arabia) Qilwah Club	Free		

Mid-season

No.	Pos.	Player	Transferred from	Fee	Date	Source
24	DF	(Montenegro) Argzim Redžović	(Malaysia) Terengganu	Free	11 Jan 2026	
20	MF	(Bosnia and Herzegovina) Dino Kalesic	(Bosnia and Herzegovina) NK Čelik Zenica	Free	11 Jan 2026	
88	MF	(South Korea) Do Dong-hyun	(South Korea) Gyeongnam FC	Free	11 Jan 2026	
91	MF	(South Korea) Park Kwang-il	(South Korea) Seongnam FC	Free	11 Jan 2026	
68	MF	(Malaysia) V. Ruventhiran	(Philippines) Aguilas–UMak	Free	11 Jan 2026	
89	DF	(Malaysia) Mahalli Jasuli	(Malaysia) KL Rangers	Free	14 Jan 2026	
33	DF	(Ivory Coast) Noel Agbre	(Malaysia) PDRM	Free	14 Jan 2026	
99	FW	(Egypt) Ahmed Shamsaldin	(Albania) KS Kastrioti	Free	21 Jan 2026	
1	GK	(Malaysia) Samuel Somerville	(Malaysia) Selangor	on loan	30 Jan 2026	
3	DF	(Philippines) Simen Lyngbø	(Malaysia) Kelantan TRW	Free	12 Feb 2026	

=== Out ===
Preseason

No.	Pos.	Player	Transferred to	Fee	Source
1	GK	(Malaysia) Shaheeswaran Thavakumar	(Malaysia) Bunga Raya	Free	
2	DF	(Malaysia) Muhammad Aidil Azuan	Free agent	Free	
7	MF	(Malaysia) Faizal Talib	(Malaysia) Machan	Free	
8	MF	(Malaysia) Muhammad Syamierul Razmee	(Malaysia) Machan	Free	
9	FW	(Malaysia) Hadi Mohamad	(Malaysia) Armed Forces	Free	
10	FW	(Malaysia) Zulkiffli Zakaria	Free agent	Free	
11	FW	(Ghana) Fuseini Issah	(Iceland) KV Vesturbaejar	Free	
13	DF	(Malaysia) Jeremy Lim	(Malaysia) Machan	Free	
14	MF	(Malaysia) Fakhrullah Rosli	(Malaysia) MBMB Warriors	Free	
15	MF	(Malaysia) Royizzat Daud	(Malaysia) Perak FA	Free	
18	GK	(Malaysia) Solehin Mamat	(Malaysia) Machan	Free	
20	MF	(Malaysia) Muhammad Luqmanul Hakeem	(Malaysia) MBMB Warriors	Free	
29	GK	(Malaysia) Ameerul Eqhwan Mohd Fauzi	(Malaysia) UM-Damansara United	Free	
39	DF	(Malaysia) Thaanush Sithiravelu	(Malaysia) Bunga Raya	Free	
47	DF	(Malaysia) Farid Nezal	(Malaysia) Immigration	Free	
69	MF	(Malaysia) Muhammad Fikri Mohamed Shah	(Malaysia) Machan	Free	
74	DF	(Malaysia) Ahmad Zhafri Zakaria	(Malaysia) Armed Forces	Free	
21	FW	(Guinea) Oumar Bangoura	(Egypt) Cairosburg FC	Free	
95	DF	(France) Rodrigue Nanitelamio	(Bulgaria) FC Marek Dupnitsa	Free	

Mid-season

No.	Pos.	Player	Transferred to	Fee	Source
3	DF	(Philippines) Charles Dabao	(Philippines) Manila Digger	Free	
33	FW	(Brazil) Anderson Brito	(Brazil) Galvez Esporte Clube	Free	
77	MF	(Philippines) Justin Baas	(Philippines) Manila Digger	Free	
8	MF	(Brazil) Patrick Gama	(Brazil) Galvez Esporte Clube	Free	
22	FW	(Brazil) Danilo Magalhães	(Brazil) Várzea Grande EC (MT)	Free	
11	FW	(Ghana) Bernard Arthur	Free agent	Free	
1	GK	(Philippines) Jun Badelic	Free agent	Free	
5	DF	(Brazil) Vitor Carvalho	Free agent	Free	
9	FW	(Brazil) Juan Douglas	Free agent	Free	
30	DF	(Malaysia) Haziq Puad	Free agent	Free	

=== Loans out ===
Date	Pos.	No.	Player	Loaned to	Type	On loan until	Fee	Ref.
First team
9 September 2025	DF	43	(Malaysia) Firdaus Ya'akub	(Malaysia) Duyong Fighters	Loan	End of season	None	
9 September 2025	FW	45	(Malaysia) Hakimy Mohd Khairol	(Malaysia) Duyong Fighters	Loan	End of season	None	

== Pre-season and friendlies ==
Win Draw Loss Fixtures

27 June 2025 Friendly	Selangor II	3–2	Melaka	Petaling Jaya, Selangor
16:45 UTC+8	? (?); ? (?); ? (?)	Report	? (?); ? (?)	Stadium: PKNS Sports Complex; Attendance: 0 (Behind-closed-doors)

8 July 2025 Friendly	Malaysia U23	4–1	Melaka	Cheras, Kuala Lumpur
20:45 UTC+8	? (?)	Report	? (?)	Stadium: Kuala Lumpur Stadium; Attendance: 0 (Behind-closed-doors)

9 July 2025 Friendly	Melaka	1–0	Kelantan Red Warrior	Durian Tunggal, Melaka
20:45 UTC+8	Shahrel Fikri 12'	Report		Stadium: UTeM Stadium; Attendance: 0 (Behind-closed-doors)

15 July 2025 Friendly	Melaka	4–0	Armed Forces	Krubong, Melaka
17:00 UTC+8	Azim Rahim 40'; Khairul Anwar 65'; Nizarrudin Jazi 70'; Afeeq Iqmal 83'	Report		Stadium: Hang Jebat Stadium; Attendance: 0 (Behind-closed-doors)

19 July 2025 Friendly	Melaka	2–2	Johor Darul Ta'zim II	Krubong, Melaka
20:45 UTC+8	Shahrel Fikri 3'; Hyeok Kwon 77'	Report	Syukur Fariz 10'; Aznil Hafiz 81'	Stadium: Hang Jebat Stadium; Attendance: 0 (Behind-closed-doors)

22 July 2025 Friendly	Kedah FA	1–1	Melaka	Alor Setar
20:45 UTC+8	Umar 59'	Report	Brito 54' (pen.)	Stadium: Sultan Abdul Halim Stadium

24 July 2025 Friendly	Manjung City	1–1	Melaka	Seri Manjung
20:45 UTC+8	Atiq 67'	Report	Victor 6'	Stadium: Manjung Stadium

25 July 2025 Friendly	Perak FA	0–1	Melaka	Chemor
17:20 UTC+8		Report	Azim Rahim 63'	Stadium: Chepor SSI Mini Stadium

2 August 2025 Friendly	Melaka	1–2	Kuala Lumpur City	Krubong
20:45 UTC+8	Aiman Danish 90+1'	Report	Safawi Rasid 20'; Paulo Josué 60'	Stadium: Hang Jebat Stadium; Attendance: 0 (Behind-closed-doors)

6 August 2025 Friendly	Melaka	4–0	Duyong Fighters	Krubong
20:45 UTC+8	Juan Douglas 28', 62', 67'; Afeeq Iqmal 90+1'	Report		Stadium: Hang Jebat Stadium; Attendance: 0 (Behind-closed-doors)

16 November 2025 Friendly	Melaka	1–0	Manjung City	Melaka City
17:00 UTC+8	Juan Douglas 28'	Report		Stadium: Hang Tuah Stadium

== Competitions ==
=== Overview ===
Competition	First match	Last match	Starting round	Final position	Record							
Competition	First match	Last match	Starting round	Final position	Pld	W	D	L	GF	GA	GD	Win %
Malaysia Super League	13 August 2025	16 May 2026	Matchday 1	11th	24	4	7	13	18	45	−27	16.67
Malaysia FA Cup	17 August 2025	15 September 2025	Round of 16	Round of 16	2	0	0	2	0	5	−5	0.00
Malaysia Cup	17 January 2026	25 February 2026	Round of 16	Quarter-finals	4	1	1	2	6	10	−4	25.00
Total					30	5	8	17	24	60	−36	16.67

Source: Competitions

=== Malaysia Super League ===
Win Draw Loss

Update:30 September 2025

13 August 2025 1	Melaka	1–1	Penang	Krubong, Melaka
20:15 MYT (UTC+8)	Juan Douglas 70'	Report	Dylan 29'; Akmal Zahir (yellow card) 63'	Stadium: Hang Jebat Stadium; Attendance: 3,800; Referee: Mohd Fusser Mad Sallih

23 August 2025 2	PDRM	0–0	Melaka	Selayang, Selangor
21:00 MYT (UTC+8)	Fakhrul Azim (yellow card) 46'; Alif Naquiddin (yellow card) 71'; Fadi Awad (yellow card) 80'; Kyaw Min Oo (yellow card) 86'	Report	Dae-yeob Gu (yellow card) 9'	Stadium: Selayang Municipal Council Stadium; Attendance: 380; Referee: Muhammad Izzul Fikri Kamaruzaman

29 August 2025 3	Sabah	1–1	Melaka	Kota Kinabalu, Sabah
20:15 MYT (UTC+8)	Gary Steven Robbat (yellow card) 27'; Dominic Tan (yellow card) 54'; Ajdin Mujagić 61'; Rawilson Batuil (yellow card) 90+2'	Report	Nasir Basharudin (yellow card) 19'; Irfan Zakaria 86'	Stadium: Likas Stadium; Attendance: 4,028; Referee: S. Logeswaran

19 September 2025 4	Terengganu	4–0	Melaka	Kuala Terengganu, Terengganu
21:00 MYT (UTC+8)	Yann Mabella 26', 45+5'; Nurillo 34'; Careca 45+2' (pen.); Alif Zakaria (yellow card) 70'; Saiful Jamaluddin (yellow card) 73'	Report	Che Rashid (red card) 45'	Stadium: Sultan Mizan Zainal Abidin Stadium; Attendance: 4,530; Referee: Muhammad Shukor Zulkiflee

30 September 2025 5	Melaka	0–1	(Brunei) DPMM	Krubong, Melaka
21:00 MYT (UTC+8)	S. Subramaniam (yellow card) 69'	Report	(yellow card) 30' Amani Aguinaldo; 36' (pen.) Murray; (yellow card) 45+1' Tommy Mawat; (yellow card) 45+3' Ramadhan Sananta; (yellow card) 68' (red card) 90+6' Miguel Oliveira	Stadium: Hang Jebat Stadium; Attendance: 723; Referee: Zam Azwan Khan Bin Rashid Khan

24 October 2025 6	Kelantan TRW	2–1	Melaka	Kota Bharu, Kelantan
21:00 MYT (UTC+8)	Michael Ozor 37' (o.g.); Danial Haqim 89'; Azwan Aripin (red card) 90+10'	Report	(yellow card) 58' Che Rashid; 90+12' Juan Douglas	Stadium: Sultan Muhammad IV Stadium

21 November 2025 7	Johor Darul Ta'zim	7–1	Melaka	Iskandar Puteri, Johor
20:15 MYT (UTC+8)	Jonathan Silva 8'; Afiq Fazail (yellow card) 29'; Bérgson 32', 58'; Heberty 48', 90'; Alberto Martín Díaz 50', 66'	Report	(yellow card) 30' Michael Ozor; (yellow card) 39' Juan Douglas; 86' Azim Rahim	Stadium: Sultan Ibrahim Stadium; Referee: Nasruddin Tamrin

30 November 2025 8	Melaka	0–3	Kuala Lumpur City	Krubong, Melaka
21:00 MYT (UTC+8)	Michael Ozor (yellow card) 56'	Report	8' Víctor Ruiz; 18' (pen.) Kpah Sherman; (yellow card) 63' Víctor Ruiz; 79' Ryan Lambert	Stadium: Hang Jebat Stadium; Referee: Mohamad Ashary Bin Ismail

6 December 2025 9	Melaka	2–0	Negeri Sembilan	Krubong, Melaka
20:15 MYT (UTC+8)	Juan Douglas 3', 30'; Michael Ozor (yellow card) 82'; Azim Rahim (yellow card) 90+8'	Report	(red card) 90+6' Khuzaimi Piee; (yellow card) 90+9' Hakimi Abdullah	Stadium: Hang Jebat Stadium; Attendance: 2,230; Referee: Norhafizi Osman

19 December 2025 10	Kuching City	4–0	Melaka	Kuching, Sarawak
20:15 MYT (UTC+8)	James Okwuosa 7'; Yuki Tanigawa (yellow card) 25'; Danial Asri 45+2'; João Pedro 49'; Ronald Ngah 71'	Report	(yellow card) 44' Nasir Basharudin; (yellow card) 66' Juan Douglas	Stadium: Sarawak State Stadium; Referee: Muhammad Faizal Talib

24 December 2025 11	Melaka	0–2	Immigration	Krubong, Melaka
21:00 MYT (UTC+8)	Michael Ozor (yellow card) 86'	Report	24' Eduardo Sosa; 30' João Pedro; (yellow card) 90' Vinicius Milani	Stadium: Hang Jebat Stadium; Referee: Mohd Afdzal Hilmi Zulkiflee

28 December 2025 12	Selangor	3–0	Melaka	Petaling Jaya, Selangor
20:15 MYT (UTC+8)	Noor Al-Rawabdeh 2'; Alvin Fortes 10'; Chrigor 13'	Report	(yellow card) 75' Nizaruddin Jazi	Stadium: Petaling Jaya Stadium; Referee: Zam Azwan Khan Rashid Khan Man

11 January 2026 13	Penang	5–0	Melaka	Georgetown, Penang
17:00 MYT (UTC+8)	Stefano Brundo 4', 9'; Dylan Wenzel-Halls 11', 14'; Firdaus Saiyadi (yellow card) 44'; Alif Ikmalrizal (yellow card) 45'; Ramadhan Hamid (yellow card) 68'; Obilor 85' (yellow card) 86'	Report	(yellow card) 70' Azim Rahim	Stadium: City Stadium; Referee: Mohammad Faizal Talib

14 January 2026 14	Melaka	3–0	PDRM	Krubong, Melaka
21:00 MYT (UTC+8)	Dino Kalesić (yellow card) 45+1'; Shahrel Fikri 55'; Badrul Affendy 58' (o.g.); Nizaruddin Jazi (yellow card) 71'; Azim Rahim 90'	Report	(yellow card) 23' Safiee Ahmad; (yellow card) 48' Fakhrul Azim; (yellow card) 53' Alif Naquiddin	Stadium: Hang Jebat Stadium; Attendance: 238

31 January 2026 15	DPMM (Brunei)	1–1	Melaka	Bandar Seri Begawan, Brunei
16:30 MYT (UTC+8)	Syafiq Ahmad 27'; Tommy Mawat Bada (yellow card) 25'; Amani Aguinaldo (yellow card) 69'	Report	53' Ahmed Shamsaldin; (yellow card) 71' Irfan Zakaria; (yellow card) 16' Umar Hakeem; (yellow card) 89' Muamer Salibašić	Stadium: Hassanal Bolkiah National Stadium; Referee: Abang Azharuddin Abdullah

21 February 2026 16	Melaka	1–2	Terengganu	Krubong, Melaka
22:00 MYT (UTC+8)	Dino Kalesic 73'	Report	36' Akhyar Rashid; 78' Baqiuddin Shamsudin; (yellow card) 53' Ubaidullah; (yellow card) 90+3' Rahadiazli Rahalim	Stadium: Hang Jebat Stadium; Referee: Muhamad Afiq Naim bin Ahmad Khilmi

28 February 2026 17	Melaka	0–0	Selangor	Krubong, Melaka
22:00 MYT (UTC+8)	Faiz Mazlan (yellow card) 42'; Argzim Redžović (yellow card) 75'	Report		Stadium: Hang Jebat Stadium

7 March 2026 18	Kuala Lumpur City	2–1	Melaka	Cheras, Kuala Lumpur
22:00 MYT (UTC+8)	Kamal Azizi 41'; Safawi Rasid 90+4'	Report	Park Kwang-il 88'	Stadium: Kuala Lumpur Stadium; Referee: Mohamad Faizudin bin Ismail

15 March 2026 19	Melaka	2–1	Kelantan TRW	Krubong, Melaka
22:00 MYT (UTC+8)				Stadium: Hang Jebat Stadium

14 April 2026 20	Melaka	1–0	Sabah	Krubong, Melaka
20:15 MYT (UTC+8)				Stadium: Hang Jebat Stadium

28 April 2026 21	Melaka	1–2	Johor Darul Ta'zim	Krubong, Melaka
21:00 MYT (UTC+8)				Stadium: Hang Jebat Stadium

3 May 2026 22	Negeri Sembilan	0–0	Melaka	Paroi, Negeri Sembilan
21:00 MYT (UTC+8)				Stadium: Tuanku Abdul Rahman Stadium

9 May 2026 23	Melaka	1–3	Kuching City	Krubong, Melaka
17:00 MYT (UTC+8)				Stadium: Hang Jebat Stadium

16 May 2026 24	Immigration	1–1	Melaka	Kangar, Perlis
00:00 MYT (UTC+8)				Stadium: Tuanku Syed Putra Stadium

Pos	Team	Pld	W	D	L	GF	GA	GD	Pts	Qualification or relegation
9	Sabah	24	5	8	11	29	44	−15	23	
10	DPMM	24	6	5	13	30	57	−27	23	Ineligible for AFC competition spots
11	Melaka	24	4	7	13	18	45	−27	19	
12	Kelantan The Real Warriors (Note: MFL officially snubs Kelantan The Real Warriors club licensing approval.)	24	4	3	17	17	63	−46	15	Ejected from Malaysian Super League
13	PDRM	24	2	5	17	17	79	−62	11	

Updated to match(es) played on 17 May 2026. Source: Malaysian Football League
Rules for classification: 1) Points; 2) Goal difference; 3) Number of goals scored.

=== Malaysia FA Cup ===
==== Round of 16 ====
17 August 2025 First leg	Melaka	0–2	Penang	Krubong
21:00 UTC+08:00	Patrick Gama (yellow card) 53'	Report	Wenzel-Halls 48', 81'; Danilo Sipovac (yellow card) 44'; Akmal Zahir (yellow card) 48'; Hasbullah Abu Bakar (yellow card) 55'	Stadium: Hang Jebat Stadium; Attendance: 2,979; Referee: Nawal Zubir

15 September 2025 Second leg	Penang	3–0	Melaka	George Town, Penang
21:00 UTC+08:00	Brundo 11'; Haziq 39'; Ariff Farhan (yellow card) 49'; Brundo (yellow card) 55'; OJ Porteria (red card) 76'; Tchétché 80'	Report	Irfan Zakaria (yellow card) 14'; Che Rashid (yellow card) 53'	Stadium: City Stadium; Attendance: 885; Referee: S. Logeswaran

Penang won 5–0 on aggregate.

=== Malaysia Cup ===
==== Round of 16 ====
17 January 2026 First leg	Melaka	2–2	Sabah	Krubong
21:00 UTC+08:00	Shahrel Fikri 3'; Park Kwang-il 38'; Dino Kalesic (red card) 45+1'; Juan Douglas (yellow card) 73'	Report	15' Ajdin Mujagić; (yellow card) 45+2' Dominic Tan; (yellow card) 52' Kumaahran; (yellow card) 72' Gabriel Peres; 88' Fergus Tierney	Stadium: Hang Jebat Stadium; Attendance: 938

22 January 2026 (Note: The match was originally scheduled for 25 January 2026.) Second leg	Sabah	0–3	Melaka	Kota Kinabalu
19:30 UTC+8	Gary Steven Robbat (red card) 44'; Fergus Tierney (yellow card) 80'	Report	(yellow card) 45+1' Aroon Kumar; 49', 87' Ahmed Shamsaldin; (yellow card) 59' Mahalli Jasuli; 85' Che Rashid	Stadium: Likas Stadium; Referee: Mohamad Faizuddin Bin Ismail

Melaka won 5–2 on aggregate.

==== Quarter-finals ====
13 February 2026 QF Leg 1	Johor Darul Ta'zim	5–0	Melaka	Iskandar Puteri
20:15 UTC+08:00	Mujagić 5', 8', 61'; Hidalgo 72'; M. Guilherme 75'	Report (FAM); Report (MFL)	(yellow card) 26' Park Kwang-il	Stadium: Sultan Ibrahim Stadium; Referee: Hasrol Amir

25 February 2026 QF Leg 2	Melaka	1–3	Johor Darul Ta'zim	Krubong
22:00 UTC+8	Argzim Redžović (yellow card) 74'; Do Dong-hyun (yellow card) 60'; Shamsaldin 90+2'	Report (FAM); Report (MFL)	7' Corbin-Ong; 31', 55' Jairo; (yellow card) 67' Teto; (yellow card) 79' Ager Aketxe	Stadium: Hang Jebat Stadium; Attendance: 2,612; Referee: Izzul Fikri

Johor Darul Ta'zim won 8–1 on aggregate.

== Squad statistics ==
=== Appearances and goals ===
No.	Pos	Nat	Player	Total		Malaysia Super League		Malaysia FA Cup		Malaysia Cup	
No.	Pos	Nat	Player	Apps	Goals	Apps	Goals	Apps	Goals	Apps	Goals
Goalkeepers
1	GK	(Malaysia) MAS	Samuel Somerville	3	0	2	0	0	0	1	0
23	GK	(Malaysia) MAS	Haziq Aiman	12	0	8+1	0	0	0	3	0
31	GK	(Malaysia) MAS	Firdaus Irman	5	0	3	0	1	0	0+1	0
Defenders
2	DF	(Malaysia) MAS	Che Rashid	21	1	13+2	0	2	0	2+2	1
3	DF	(Philippines) PHI	Simen Lyngbø	4	0	2	0	0	0	2	0
17	DF	(Malaysia) MAS	Irfan Zakaria	22	1	16+1	1	2	0	3	0
18	DF	(Malaysia) MAS	Aroon Kumar	16	0	7+6	0	0	0	2+1	0
24	DF	(Montenegro) MNE	Argzim Redžović	3	0	2	0	0	0	1	0
25	DF	(Malaysia) MAS	Khairul Anwar Shahrudin	4	0	0+3	0	1	0	0	0
26	DF	(Malaysia) MAS	Umar Hakeem	16	0	10+2	0	1	0	3	0
27	DF	(Malaysia) MAS	Hafiz Mohd Johar	5	0	1+4	0	0	0	0	0
33	DF	(Ivory Coast) CIV	Noel Agbre	8	0	4	0	0	0	4	0
37	DF	(South Korea) KOR	Dae-yeob Gu	19	0	14+1	0	1	0	2+1	0
42	DF	(Malaysia) MAS	Zulkhairi Zulkeply	2	0	0+1	0	1	0	0	0
89	DF	(Malaysia) MAS	Mahalli Jasuli	6	0	0+4	0	0	0	0+2	0
Midfielders
4	MF	(Malaysia) MAS	Nasir Basharudin	12	0	10	0	0+2	0	0	0
6	MF	(Malaysia) MAS	Faiz Mazlan	10	0	4+3	0	0+1	0	0+2	0
7	MF	(Malaysia) MAS	Aiman Danish	14	0	3+8	0	0+1	0	1+1	0
16	MF	(Nigeria) NGA	Michael Onyekachi Ozor	15	0	8+5	0	1	0	0+1	0
19	MF	(Malaysia) MAS	Durrkeswaran Ganasan	10	0	4+5	0	0+1	0	0	0
20	MF	(Bosnia and Herzegovina) BIH	Dino Kalesic	8	1	4+1	1	0	0	3	0
28	MF	(Malaysia) MAS	Fahmi Faizal	0	0	0	0	0	0	0	0
68	MF	(Malaysia) MAS	V. Ruventhiran	9	0	5	0	0	0	4	0
80	MF	(Malaysia) MAS	Nizaruddin Jazi	14	0	3+8	0	1	0	0+2	0
88	MF	(South Korea) KOR	Do Dong-hyun	9	0	5	0	0	0	4	0
91	MF	(South Korea) KOR	Park Kwang-il	9	1	3+2	0	0	0	4	1
Forwards
10	FW	(Malaysia) MAS	Shahrel Fikri	22	2	12+4	1	2	0	3+1	1
12	FW	(Malaysia) MAS	Azim Rahim	14	2	3+9	2	0+1	0	0+1	0
29	FW	(Malaysia) MAS	Afeeq Iqmal	10	0	6+2	0	0+2	0	0	0
99	FW	(Egypt) EGY	Ahmed Shamsaldin	6	4	3	1	0	0	2+1	3
Players transferred/loaned out during the season
3	DF	(Philippines) PHI	Charles Dabao	1	0	1	0	0	0	0	0
8	MF	(Brazil) BRA	Patrick Gama	6	0	4	0	2	0	0	0
11	FW	(Ghana) GHA	Bernard Arthur	3	0	2	0	1	0	0	0
22	FW	(Brazil) BRA	Danilo Magalhães	6	0	2+3	0	0+1	0	0	0
33	FW	(Brazil) BRA	Anderson Brito	4	0	1+2	0	1	0	0	0
77	MF	(Philippines) PHI	Justin Baas	3	0	1+1	0	1	0	0	0
1	GK	(Philippines) PHI	Jun Badelic	5	0	4	0	1	0	0	0
5	DF	(Brazil) BRA	Vitor Carvalho	11	0	9	0	2	0	0	0
9	FW	(Brazil) BRA	Juan Douglas	12	4	8+2	4	1	0	0+1	0
30	DF	(Malaysia) MAS	Haziq Puad	0	0	0	0	0	0	0	0
43	DF	(Malaysia) MAS	Firdaus Ya'akub	0	0	0	0	0	0	0	0
45	FW	(Malaysia) MAS	Hakimy Mohd Khairol	0	0	0	0	0	0	0	0

Source: Competitions
