= 2026–27 Melaka F.C. season =

Melaka
2026–27 season
- President: Datuk Wira Nur Azmi Ahmad
- CEO: Muhammad Najmi Mohd Nordin
- Head coach: E. Elavarasan
- Stadium: Hang Jebat Stadium
- Malaysia Super League: TBD
- Malaysia FA Cup: Round of 16
- Malaysia Cup: TBD
- Top goalscorer: Do Dong-hyun (2 goals)
- Highest home attendance: 3,056
- Lowest home attendance: 1,056
Home colours	Away colours

The 2026–27 season is the fourth season in the history of Melaka F.C., and the club's second season in Malaysia Super League. In addition to the domestic league, the team will participate in the Malaysia FA Cup and the Malaysia Cup.

== Coaching staff ==
As of August 2026

Position	Name
Team manager	(Malaysia) Muhammad Najmi Nordin
Head coach	(Malaysia) E. Elavarasan
Assistant coach	(Bosnia and Herzegovina) Muamer Salibašić
Goalkeeper coach	(Malaysia) Mazlan Wahid
Physio	(Malaysia) Fakhrusy Syakirin Yaacob
Team official	(Malaysia) Zulkarnain Osman
Team coordinator	(Malaysia) Al Qayyum Azlan Farhan
Team media	(Malaysia) Iz'aan Firdaus Chin
Masseur	(Malaysia) Muhammad Afif Mohd Derus
Kitman	(Malaysia) Ahmad Shukri Othman

== Players ==
As of 8 Sep 2026

Note: Flags indicate national team as defined under FIFA eligibility rules; some limited exceptions apply. Players may hold more than one non-FIFA nationality.

No.	Pos.	Nation	Player
2	DF	MAS	Che Rashid
3	DF	PHI	Simen Lyngbø
4	DF	MAS	Aroon Kumar
5	DF	KOR	Shin-hoo Kim
6	MF	MAS	Zahril Azri
7	MF	KOR	Park Kwang-il
8	MF	KOR	Do Dong-hyun
9	FW	LBR	Kpah Sherman
10	MF	MYA	Hein Htet Aung
11	FW	MAS	Jafri Firdaus Chew
13	FW	CAM	Abdel Kader Coulibaly
15	MF	MAS	Hasbullah Abu Bakar
16	MF	NGR	Michael Onyekachi Ozor
19	GK	MAS	Khairul Fahmi Che Mat (captain)
20	MF	BIH	Dino Kalesic
21	DF	MAS	Kamal Arif Azrai

No.	Pos.	Nation	Player
22	MF	MAS	Syahir Rashid
23	DF	MAS	Azwan Aripin
24	DF	MNE	Argzim Redžović
25	DF	MAS	Khairul Anwar Shahrudin
26	GK	MAS	Hafiz A. Azizi
29	GK	MAS	Firdaus Irman
30	FW	BRA	Christian de Souza André
33	DF	CIV	Noel Agbre
39	DF	MAS	Thaanush Sithiravelu
51	MF	JPN	Shuto Asano
66	MF	IRI	Ali Nouri Zangir
68	MF	MAS	V. Ruventhiran
80	MF	MAS	Nizaruddin Jazi
89	DF	MAS	Mahalli Jasuli
98	FW	FRA	Ronny Song
99	FW	MAS	Alif Ikmalrizal

== Transfers ==
=== In ===
Pre-season

Date	Pos.	Player	Transferred from	Ref
31 May 2026	DF	(Malaysia) Firdaus Ya'akub	(Malaysia) Duyong Fighters	Loan return
31 May 2026	FW	(Malaysia) Hakimy Mohd Khairol	(Malaysia) Duyong Fighters	Loan return
31 May 2026	FW	(Malaysia) Afeeq Iqmal	(Malaysia) Kedah FA	Loan return
8 August 2026	GK	(Malaysia) Khairul Fahmi Che Mat	(Malaysia) Sabah	Free
14 August 2026	ST	(Malaysia) Jafri Firdaus Chew	(Malaysia) Sabah	Free
14 August 2026	MF	(Malaysia) Syahir Rashid	(Malaysia) Kelantan The Real Warriors	Free
14 August 2026	DF	(Malaysia) Azwan Aripin	(Malaysia) Kelantan The Real Warriors	Free
14 August 2026	MF	(Malaysia) Zahril Azri	(Malaysia) Negeri Sembilan	Free
14 August 2026	DF	(Malaysia) Thaanush Sithiravelu	(Malaysia) Selangor II	Free
14 August 2026	MF	(Malaysia) Hasbullah Abu Bakar	(Malaysia) Penang	Free
14 August 2026	FW	(Malaysia) Alif Ikmalrizal	(Malaysia) Penang	Free
14 August 2026	DF	(Malaysia) Kamal Arif Azrai	(Malaysia) Perak FA	Free
14 August 2026	GK	(Malaysia) Hafiz A. Azizi	(Malaysia) PDRM	Free
14 August 2026	FW	(Cambodia) Abdel Kader Coulibaly	(Cambodia) Angkor Tiger FC	Free
14 August 2026	FW	(Brazil) Christian de Souza André	(Bosnia and Herzegovina) HNK Tomislav	Free
14 August 2026	MF	(Myanmar) Hein Htet Aung	(Malaysia) Kelantan The Real Warriors	Free
22 August 2026	MF	(Japan) Shuto Asano	(Japan) FC Osaka	Free
28 August 2026	FW	(Liberia) Kpah Sherman	(Malaysia) Kuala Lumpur City	Free
30 August 2026	MF	(Iran) Ali Nouri Zangir	(Mongolia) Khangarid FC	Free
3 September 2026	DF	(South Korea) Shin-hoo Kim	Free agent	Free
3 September 2026	FW	(France) (Cameroon) Ronny Song	Free agent	Free

=== Out ===
Pre-season

Date	Pos.	Player	Transferred To	Ref
31 May 2026	MF	(Malaysia) Umar Hakeem	(Malaysia) Johor Darul Ta'zim II	End of loan
31 May 2026	GK	(Malaysia) Haziq Aiman	(Malaysia) Johor Darul Ta'zim II	End of loan
31 May 2026	MF	(Malaysia) Aiman Danish	(Malaysia) Johor Darul Ta'zim II	End of loan
1 June 2026	GK	(Malaysia) Samuel Somerville	(Malaysia) Selangor	End of loan
1 July 2026	FW	(Malaysia) Fahmi Faizal	Free agent	Free
1 July 2026	DF	(Malaysia) Zulkhairi Zulkeply	Free agent	Free
1 July 2026	DF	(Malaysia) Firdaus Ya'akub	Free agent	Free
1 July 2026	FW	(Malaysia) Hakimy Mohd Khairol	(Malaysia) Bunga Raya	Free
1 July 2026	DF	(South Korea) Dae-yeob Gu	Free agent	Free
1 July 2026	FW	(Egypt) Ahmed Shamsaldin	Free agent	Free
4 July 2026	DF	(Malaysia) Irfan Zakaria	(Malaysia) Kuching City	Free
15 July 2026	DF	(Malaysia) Nasir Basharudin	(Malaysia) Perak FA	Free
16 July 2026	FW	(Malaysia) Afeeq Iqmal	(Malaysia) Kedah FA	Free
17 July 2026	FW	(Malaysia) Shahrel Fikri	(Malaysia) Penang	Free
20 July 2026	FW	(Malaysia) Faiz Mazlan	(Malaysia) Terengganu	Free
21 July 2026	MF	(Malaysia) G. Durrkeswaran	(Malaysia) Penang	Free
1 August 2026	DF	(Malaysia) Hafiz Mohd Johar	(Malaysia) Immigration FC II	Free

=== Loans out ===
Date	Pos.	No.	Player	Loaned to	Type	On loan until	Fee	Ref.
First team
8 September 2026	FW	12	(Malaysia) Azim Rahim	(Malaysia) UM-Damansara United	Loan	30 June 2027	None	

== Pre-season and friendlies ==
Win Draw Loss Fixtures

1 August 2026 Friendly	(M1) Kelantan Red Warrior (Malaysia)	2–2	(Malaysia) Melaka	Kota Bharu, Kelantan
20:45 UTC+8	Phillip Musa 31'; Emmanuel Mbarga 83'	Report	Dino Kalesic 5'; Syahir Rashid 34'	Stadium: Sultan Muhammad IV Stadium

August 2026 Friendly	Melaka (Malaysia)	4–2	(Malaysia) UM-Damansara United (M2)
: UTC+8				Attendance: 0 (Behind-closed-doors)

11 August 2026 Friendly	Melaka (Malaysia)	2–2	(Malaysia) Perak FA (M2)	Melaka City, Melaka
17:00 UTC+8	? (?); ? (?)	Report	Muslihuddin Atiq (?); Takuya Fushimi (?)	Stadium: Hang Tuah Stadium; Attendance: 0 (Behind-closed-doors)

15 August 2026 Friendly	Melaka (Malaysia)	2–1	(Singapore) FC Jurong (S1)	Krubong, Melaka
20:30 UTC+8	Mahalli Jasuli 68'; Azim Rahim 82'	Report	Toa Suenaga 40'	Stadium: Hang Jebat Stadium

17 August 2026 Friendly	Melaka (Malaysia)	1–1 (1–3 p)	(Cambodia) Phnom Penh Crown (C1)	Krubong, Melaka
20:45 UTC+8	Shin-hoo Kim 66'	Report	? (?)	Stadium: Hang Jebat Stadium

== Competitions ==
=== Overview ===
Competition	First match	Last match	Starting round	Final position	Record							
Competition	First match	Last match	Starting round	Final position	Pld	W	D	L	GF	GA	GD	Win %
Malaysia Super League	22 August 2026		Matchday 1		3	1	0	2	4	7	−3	33.33
Malaysia FA Cup	2 September 2026	9 September 2026	Round of 16	Round of 16	2	0	0	2	1	3	−2	0.00
Malaysia Cup					0	0	0	0	0	0	+0	—
Total					5	1	0	4	5	10	−5	20.00

Last updated: 9 September 2026
Source: Competitions

=== Malaysia Super League ===
Win Draw Loss

22 August 2026 1	Terengganu	3–0	Melaka	Kuala Nerus
09:00 MYT (UTC+8)	Kastaneer 12', 80'; Víctor Ruiz 45'	Report		Stadium: Sultan Mizan Zainal Abidin Stadium; Attendance: 6,550

30 August 2026 2	Melaka	2–1	Negeri Sembilan	Krubong
20:15 MYT (UTC+8)	Noel Agbre 33'; Christian de Souza 90+3'	Report	20' Yusuke Minagawa	Stadium: Hang Jebat Stadium; Attendance: 3,056

6 September 2026 3	Selangor	3–2	Melaka	Petaling Jaya
20:15 MYT (UTC+8)	Chrigor 11', 51'; Tabinas 90+1'	Report	59' Syahir Rashid; 75' Do Dong-hyun	Stadium: MBPJ Stadium

12 September 2026 4	Melaka	1–2	Kuching City	Krubong
20:15 MYT (UTC+8)	Do Dong-hyun 90+2'	Report	22' Jerome; 90+7' Ronald Ngah	Stadium: Hang Jebat Stadium; Attendance: 1,056

17 October 2026 5	Melaka	3–2	Kuala Lumpur City	Krubong
21:00 MYT (UTC+8)	Christian 41'; Kpah Sherman 54'; V. Ruventhiran 86'	Report	13' Fareed Sadat; 77' (o.g.) Syahir Rashid	Stadium: Hang Jebat Stadium

1 November 2026 6	Penang	1–2	Melaka	Batu Kawan
00:00 MYT (UTC+8)	Stefano Brundo 62' (pen.)	Report	72' Dino Kalesic; 90' (pen.) Coulibaly	Stadium: Penang State Stadium

21 November 2026 7	Melaka	v	Star City	Krubong
00:00 MYT (UTC+8)				Stadium: Hang Jebat Stadium

5 December 2026 8	Sabah	v	Melaka	Kota Kinabalu
00:00 MYT (UTC+8)				Stadium: Likas Stadium

13 December 2026 9	DPMM	v	Melaka	Bandar Seri Begawan
00:00 MYT (UTC+8)				Stadium: Hassanal Bolkiah National Stadium

19 December 2026 10	Melaka	v	Kelantan Red Warrior	Krubong
00:00 MYT (UTC+8)				Stadium: Hang Jebat Stadium

30 December 2026 11	Melaka	v	Johor Darul Ta'zim	Krubong
00:00 MYT (UTC+8)				Stadium: Hang Jebat Stadium

2 January 2027 12	Melaka	v	Terengganu	Krubong
00:00 MYT (UTC+8)				Stadium: Hang Jebat Stadium

10 January 2027 13	Melaka	v	Penang	Krubong
00:00 MYT (UTC+8)				Stadium: Hang Jebat Stadium

20 February 2027 14	Melaka	v	Selangor	Krubong
00:00 MYT (UTC+8)				Stadium: Hang Jebat Stadium

5 March 2027 15	Kelantan Red Warrior	v	Melaka	Kota Bharu
00:00 MYT (UTC+8)				Stadium: Sultan Muhammad IV Stadium

21 March 2027 16	Kuching City	v	Melaka	Kuching
00:00 MYT (UTC+8)				Stadium: Taha Ariffin Stadium

3 April 2027 17	Kuala Lumpur City	v	Melaka	Cheras
00:00 MYT (UTC+8)				Stadium: Kuala Lumpur Stadium

25 April 2027 18	Melaka	v	Sabah	Krubong
00:00 MYT (UTC+8)				Stadium: Hang Jebat Stadium

2 May 2027 19	Melaka	v	DPMM	Krubong
00:00 MYT (UTC+8)				Stadium: Hang Jebat Stadium

9 May 2027 20	Negeri Sembilan	v	Melaka	Paroi
00:00 MYT (UTC+8)				Stadium: Tuanku Abdul Rahman Stadium

14 May 2027 21	Star City	v	Melaka	Kangar
00:00 MYT (UTC+8)				Stadium: Tuanku Syed Putra Stadium

May 2027 22	Johor Darul Ta'zim	v	Melaka	Iskandar Puteri
00:00 MYT (UTC+8)				Stadium: Sultan Ibrahim Stadium

Pos	Team	Pld	W	D	L	GF	GA	GD	Pts
4	DPMM (Note: DPMM cannot qualify for Asian Football Confederation competitions as they are based in Brunei.)	6	4	0	2	9	8	+1	12
5	Sabah	6	3	1	2	9	6	+3	10
6	Melaka	6	3	0	3	10	12	−2	9
7	Kuala Lumpur City (Note: Negeri Sembilan were awarded a 3–0 win and three points after KL City were found to have failed to register enough players.)	6	2	0	4	6	16	−10	6
8	Negeri Sembilan	6	1	2	3	8	11	−3	5

Updated to match(es) played on 1 November 2026. Source: Malaysian Football League
Rules for classification: 1) Points; 2) Goal difference; 3) Number of goals scored.

=== FA Cup ===
As a Super League side, Melaka entered the competition in the round of 16.

==== Round of 16 ====
2 September 2026 First leg	Melaka	0–1	Penang	Krubong
20:00 UTC+08:00		Report	22' Obilor	Stadium: Hang Jebat Stadium; Attendance: 1,510; Referee: Zam Azwan Khan Bin Rashid Khan

9 September 2026 Second leg	Penang	2–1 (3–1 agg.)	Melaka	George Town, Penang
16:30UTC+08:00	Stefano Brundo 74'; Enzo Célestine 90+4'	Report	35' Kpah Sherman	Stadium: City Stadium

Penang won 3–1 on aggregate.

=== Malaysia Cup ===
==== Knockout stage ====
As a Super League side, Melaka entered the competition in the round of 16.

==== Round of 16 ====
22–24 January 2027 First leg	To be determined	v	Melaka	TBD
TBD UTC+08:00				Stadium: TBD

29–31 January 2027 Second leg	Melaka	v	To be determined	Krubong
TBD UTC+08:00				Stadium: Hang Jebat Stadium

== Squad statistics ==
=== Appearances and goals ===
No.	Pos	Nat	Player	Total		Malaysia Super League		Malaysia FA Cup		Malaysia Cup	
No.	Pos	Nat	Player	Apps	Goals	Apps	Goals	Apps	Goals	Apps	Goals
Goalkeepers
19	GK	(Malaysia) MAS	Khairul Fahmi Che Mat	3	0	3	0	0	0	0	0
26	GK	(Malaysia) MAS	Hafiz A. Azizi	0	0	0	0	0	0	0	0
29	GK	(Malaysia) MAS	Firdaus Irman	4	0	2	0	2	0	0	0
Defenders
2	DF	(Malaysia) MAS	Che Rashid	5	0	1+2	0	2	0	0	0
3	DF	(Philippines) PHI	Simen Lyngbø	5	0	4	0	1	0	0	0
4	DF	(Malaysia) MAS	Aroon Kumar	3	0	2+1	0	0	0	0	0
5	DF	(South Korea) KOR	Shin-hoo Kim	5	0	3+1	0	1	0	0	0
21	DF	(Malaysia) MAS	Kamal Arif Azrai	3	0	2	0	1	0	0	0
23	DF	(Malaysia) MAS	Azwan Aripin	7	0	5+1	0	1	0	0	0
24	DF	(Montenegro) MNE	Argzim Redžović	1	0	1	0	0	0	0	0
25	DF	(Malaysia) MAS	Khairul Anwar Shahrudin	0	0	0	0	0	0	0	0
33	DF	(Ivory Coast) CIV	Noel Agbre	7	1	5	1	2	0	0	0
39	DF	(Malaysia) MAS	Thaanush Sithiravelu	4	0	0+2	0	0+2	0	0	0
89	DF	(Malaysia) MAS	Mahalli Jasuli	4	0	1+1	0	0+2	0	0	0
Midfielders
6	MF	(Malaysia) MAS	Zahril Azri	1	0	1	0	0	0	0	0
7	MF	(South Korea) KOR	Park Kwang-il	6	0	2+3	0	1	0	0	0
8	MF	(South Korea) KOR	Do Dong-hyun	5	2	2+2	2	1	0	0	0
10	MF	(Myanmar) MYA	Hein Htet Aung	4	0	2	0	1+1	0	0	0
15	MF	(Malaysia) MAS	Hasbullah Abu Bakar	3	0	0+1	0	2	0	0	0
16	MF	(Nigeria) NGR	Michael Onyekachi Ozor	1	0	0+1	0	0	0	0	0
20	MF	(Bosnia and Herzegovina) BIH	Dino Kalesic	2	1	2	1	0	0	0	0
22	MF	(Malaysia) MAS	Syahir Rashid	7	1	2+3	1	0+2	0	0	0
28	MF	(Malaysia) MAS	Fahmi Faizal	0	0	0	0	0	0	0	0
51	MF	(Japan) JPN	Shuto Asano	1	0	1	0	0	0	0	0
66	MF	(Iran) IRI	Ali Nouri	6	0	1+3	0	2	0	0	0
68	MF	(Malaysia) MAS	V. Ruventhiran	6	1	3+2	1	1	0	0	0
80	MF	(Malaysia) MAS	Nizaruddin Jazi	1	0	0+1	0	0	0	0	0
Forwards
9	FW	(Liberia) LBR	Kpah Sherman	7	2	5	1	2	1	0	0
11	FW	(Malaysia) MAS	Jafri Firdaus Chew	8	0	5+1	0	1+1	0	0	0
13	FW	(Cambodia) CAM	Abdel Kader Coulibaly	2	1	2	1	0	0	0	0
30	FW	(Brazil) BRA	Christian de Souza André	7	2	4+1	2	1+1	0	0	0
98	FW	(France) FRA	Ronny Song	1	0	0+1	0	0	0	0	0
99	FW	(Malaysia) MAS	Alif Ikmalrizal	5	0	2+2	0	0+1	0	0	0
Players transferred/loaned out during the season
12	FW	(Malaysia) MAS	Azim Rahim	0	0	0	0	0	0	0	0

Source: Competitions
