= 2025–26 Malaysia Super League =

Malaysian football season

Malaysia Super League
- Season: 2025–26
- Dates: 8 August 2025 – 17 May 2026
- Champions: Johor Darul Ta'zim; 12th Super League title 12th Malaysian title
- Relegated: Kelantan The Real Warriors (ejected)
- Champions League Elite: Johor Darul Ta'zim
- Champions League Two: Kuching City
- Matches: 156
- Goals: 514 (3.29 per match)
- Top goalscorer: Bérgson (27 goals)
- Biggest home win: Johor Darul Ta'zim 10–0 DPMM (25 October 2025)
- Biggest away win: Kelantan The Real Warriors 1–14 Johor Darul Ta'zim (10 May 2026)
- Highest scoring: Kelantan The Real Warriors 1–14 Johor Darul Ta'zim (10 May 2026)
- Longest winning run: 20 matches Johor Darul Ta'zim
- Longest unbeaten run: 24 matches Johor Darul Ta'zim
- Longest winless run: 10 matches PDRM
- Longest losing run: 10 matches PDRM
- Highest attendance: 32,777; Johor Darul Ta'zim 3–0 Selangor (8 August 2025)
- Lowest attendance: 220; PDRM 2–2 DPMM (9 August 2025)
- Total attendance: 605,342
- Average attendance: 3,931
- All statistics correct as of 17 May 2026.

The 2025–26 Malaysia Super League (Malay: Liga Super Malaysia 2025–26) was the 22nd season of the Malaysia Super League, the top-tier professional football league in Malaysia since its establishment in 2004, and the 44th season of the top-flight Malaysian football overall.

Johor Darul Ta'zim are the defending champions, having won their record 12th Super League title in the previous season.

== Teams ==
=== Changes from the previous season ===
A total of thirteen teams contest the league, including ten from the 2024–25 season, two promoted from the A1 Semi-Pro League and one invited team. Kedah Darul Aman and Perak were expelled following financial difficulties. Two teams promoted from the A1 Semi-Pro League, Melaka and Immigration, are debuting in the Super League. Meanwhile, the Malaysian Football League (MFL) announced that the Brunei-based DPMM FC will compete in the new Super League season, after receiving approval from FIFA to participate in Malaysia’s professional league. On 20 June, Sri Pahang have officially withdrawn from the 2025–26 season, despite being granted a national licence by the MFL. The club submitted a formal letter dated 16 June, stating their decision not to participate in the new campaign, which kicks off on 8 August 2025. Kelantan Darul Naim changed the name to Kelantan The Real Warriors for this season.

| Invited teams | ▲ Promoted from A1 Semi-Pro League | ▼ Ejected from Super League | Withdrawn from Super League |
|---|---|---|---|
| DPMM FC | Melaka; Immigration | Kedah Darul Aman | Sri Pahang; Perak |

== Stadiums and locations ==
| Team | Location | Stadium | Capacity |
|---|---|---|---|
| DPMM | Bandar Seri Begawan | Hassanal Bolkiah National Stadium | 28,000 |
| Immigration | Kangar | Tuanku Syed Putra Stadium | 20,000 |
| Johor Darul Ta'zim | Iskandar Puteri | Sultan Ibrahim Stadium | 40,000 |
| Kelantan The Real Warriors | Kota Bharu | Sultan Muhammad IV Stadium | 30,000 |
| Kuala Lumpur City | Cheras | Kuala Lumpur Stadium | 18,000 |
| Kuching City | Kuching | Taha Ariffin Stadium | 26,000 |
| Melaka | Krubong | Hang Jebat Stadium | 40,000 |
| Negeri Sembilan | Seremban | Tuanku Abdul Rahman Stadium | 25,550 |
| PDRM | Selayang | Selayang Stadium | 30,000 |
| Penang | George Town | City Stadium | 20,000 |
| Sabah | Kota Kinabalu | Likas Stadium | 35,000 |
| Selangor | Petaling Jaya | MBPJ Stadium | 10,661 |
| Terengganu | Kuala Nerus | Sultan Mizan Zainal Abidin Stadium | 50,000 |

Locations of teams in the 2025–26 Malaysia Super League

== Personnel and kits ==
| Team | Head coach | Captain | Kit manufacturer | Kit sponsors | |
| Team | Head coach | Captain | Kit manufacturer | Main | Other(s) |
|---|---|---|---|---|---|
| DPMM | (Scotland) Jamie McAllister | (Brunei) Azwan Ali Rahman | (Germany) Puma | Royal Brunei Airlines | List: Front: None; Back: DST; Sleeves: None; Shorts: None |
| Immigration | (Malaysia) Yusri Che Lah | (Malaysia) Rizal Ghazali | (Malaysia) AL Sports | Weststar | List: Front: FIVE Petroleum; Back: CTIntel, Al-Ikhsan Sports; Sleeves: GoHub, Enegel; Shorts: None |
| Johor Darul Ta'zim | (Spain) Xisco Muñoz | (Malaysia) Afiq Fazail | (United States) Nike | Toyota | List: Front: None; Back: None; Sleeves: JCORP; Shorts: None |
| Kelantan The Real Warriors | (Malaysia) Zairul Fitree (Interim) | (Malaysia) Azam Azih | (Malaysia) PUC Sport | Al Hamra Group | List: Front: MIR, Rohm Semiconductor, KijangHandal; Back: PUC Sport, Ekspres Perdana, Fresh Life, Eniq World Group, Kemasin Beach Resort, Bard Gym; Sleeves: Qashiwa Travel, redONE Mobile; Shorts: None |
| Kuala Lumpur City | (Serbia) Risto Vidaković | (Malaysia) Paulo Josué | (Malaysia) StarSports | DBKL | List: Front: None; Back: None; Sleeves: None; Shorts: None |
| Kuching City | (Singapore) Aidil Sharin Sahak | (Nigeria) James Okwuosa | (Malaysia) StarSports | Press Metal | List: Front: LSC; Back: City of Unity; Sleeves: None; Shorts: None |
| Melaka | (Malaysia) E. Elavarasan | (Malaysia) Nasir Basharudin | (Thailand) FBT | Xperts.my | List: Front: Kemalak Group, DCS, Qalb Zahara; Back: Enca Group, Royan Trading, Modulasi Jasa, Lindo Wellness; Sleeves: Aman Adjusters, Profaz Maju Niaga; Shorts: None |
| Negeri Sembilan | (Malaysia) K. Rajan (interim) | (Malaysia) Khuzaimi Piee | (Thailand) Warrix | Matrix Concept | List: Front: NR, MBI Negeri Sembilan; Back: NSFC Sports Physio Centre, IRC; Sleeves: Seremban Engineering Berhad, Gemencheh Granite Sdn Bhd; Shorts: None |
| PDRM | (Malaysia) Eddy Gapil (interim) | (Myanmar) Kyaw Min Oo | (Singapore) HUNDRED | redONE Mobile | List: Front: Sportsclick.my; Back: Cosmic; Sleeves: beONE Prepaid, Suria; Shorts: None |
| Penang | (Malaysia) Wan Rohaimi | (Argentina) Stefano Brundo | (Malaysia) Kaki Jersi | Penang2030 | List: Front: SA Mutiara Deco, Tobaki; Back: Untuk Sukan Kita!; Sleeves: PDC, Mat Saleh Barber; Shorts: None |
| Sabah | (Spain) Juan Torres | (Malaysia) Dominic Tan | (Germany) Adidas | Sawit Kinabalu | List: Front: Waig, Sabah Credit Corporation; Back: Cement Industries (Sabah) Sdn Bhd, Sportmart; Sleeves: None; Shorts: None |
| Selangor | (South Korea) Kim Pan-Gon | (Malaysia) Faisal Halim | (Spain) Joma | PKNS | List: Front: Khind, AKE, MBI Selangor; Back: Daikin, SANI, World Wide Holdings; Sleeves: Sime Darby Property, MBPJ; Shorts: None |
| Terengganu | (Malaysia) Tengku Hazman (interim) | (Malaysia) Shahrul Nizam | (Malaysia) ALX | Terengganu Incorporated | List: Front: MS Citajaya, TDM (H), KMI Healthcare (A); Back: Ladang Rakyat, In Saff Travel & Tours, Al-Ikhsan Sports; Sleeves: SATU, EPIC; Shorts: None |

=== Coaching changes ===
Note: Flags indicate national team as has been defined under FIFA eligibility rules. Players may hold more than one non-FIFA nationality.

| Team | Outgoing coach | Manner of departure | Date of vacancy | Position in table | Incoming coach | Date of appointment |
|---|---|---|---|---|---|---|
| Johor Darul Ta'zim | (Venezuela) Héctor Bidoglio | Mutual agreement | 23 May 2025 | Pre-season | (Spain) Xisco Muñoz | 6 June 2025 |
| Negeri Sembilan | (Malaysia) K. Nanthakumar | Resigned | 13 June 2025 | Pre-season | (Malaysia) Nidzam Jamil | 13 June 2025 |
| Terengganu | (Malaysia) Badrul Afzan | Appointed to permanent role | | | | 15 June 2025 |
| Kelantan The Real Warriors | (South Korea) Park Jae-hong | End of contract | 30 June 2025 | Pre-season | (Malaysia) E. Elavarasan | 1 July 2025 |
| Kuala Lumpur City | (Croatia) Miroslav Kuljanac | End of contract | 30 June 2025 | Pre-season | (Serbia) Risto Vidaković | 2 July 2025 |
| Sabah | (Slovakia) Martin Stano | Redesignated | 14 August 2025 | 8th | (Australia) Jean-Paul de Marigny | 14 August 2025 |
| Selangor | (Japan) Katsuhito Kinoshi | Sacked | 26 September 2025 | 5th | (France) Christophe Gamel (interim) | 26 September 2025 |
| Kelantan The Real Warriors | (Malaysia) E. Elavarasan | Mutual agreement | 3 October 2025 | 7th | (Malaysia) Akmal Rizal (interim) | 16 October 2025 |
| Sabah | (Australia) Jean-Paul de Marigny | Resigned | 18 December 2025 | 9th | (Malaysia) Alto Linus (Interim) | 20 December 2025 |
| Terengganu | (Malaysia) Badrul Afzan | Sacked | 25 December 2025 | 5th | (Malaysia) Tengku Hazman (interim) | 25 December 2025 |
| Melaka | (Malaysia) K. Devan | Resigned | 28 December 2025 | 12th | (Malaysia) E. Elavarasan | 3 January 2026 |
| Selangor | (France) Christophe Gamel (interim) | End of Interim | 5 January 2026 | 3rd | (South Korea) Kim Pan-gon | 5 January 2026 |
| Negeri Sembilan | (Malaysia) Nidzam Jamil | Resigned | 24 February 2026 | 9th | (Malaysia) K. Rajan (Interim) | 24 February 2026 |
| Sabah | (Malaysia) Alto Linus (Interim) | End of Interim | 25 February 2026 | 11th | (Spain) Juan Torres | 25 February 2026 |
| Kelantan The Real Warriors | (Malaysia) Akmal Rizal (interim) | Sacked | 12 March 2026 | 12th | (Malaysia) Zairul Fitree (Interim) | 12 March 2026 |

== Foreign players ==
The Malaysian Football League (MFL) announced the increased amount of foreign players quota to fifteen. Seven import players allowed on the pitch must consist of four open, one Asian, and two ASEAN players. On 9 July 2025, the MFL announced reducing the number of foreign players allowed on the pitch to six. The revised foreign player quota will now be 6+3 (substitutes), with a composition of four open, one Asian and one ASEAN player.

- Players name in **bold** indicates the player is registered during the mid-season transfer window.
- This list only includes those registered to play in the league, not included in the AFC Competition.

Note: Flags indicate national team as defined under FIFA eligibility rules.

| Team | Player 1 | Player 2 | Player 3 | Player 4 | Player 5 | Player 6 | Player 7 | Player 8 | Player 9 | Player 10 | Player 11 | Player 12 | AFC Player | ASEAN Player | ASEAN Player | Unregistered players | Former players |
|---|---|---|---|---|---|---|---|---|---|---|---|---|---|---|---|---|---|
| DPMM | (Brazil) Jordan Rodrigues | (Brazil) Michel | (Ghana) **Ibrahim Sulley** | (Ghana) Prosper Boakye | (Nigeria) **Christian Irobiso** | (Portugal) Miguel Oliveira | | | | | | | (Australia) Jordan Murray | (Indonesia) Ramadhan Sananta | (Philippines) Amani Aguinaldo | | (North Macedonia) Kristijan Naumovski |
| Immigration | (Brazil) Felipe Ribeiro | (Brazil) João Pedro | (Brazil) Pedro Santos | (Brazil) Rafael Holstein | (Brazil) Vinicius Milani | (Burundi) Elvis Kamsoba | (Colombia) Wilmar Jordán | (Senegal) **Babacar Guèye** | (Venezuela) Eduardo Sosa | | | | (Iran) Amirali Chegini | (Thailand) Keron Ornchaiyaphum | (Singapore) **Zulfahmi Arifin** | | (Myanmar) Thiha Zaw |
| Johor Darul Ta'zim | (Argentina) Jonathan Silva | (Argentina) Manuel Hidalgo | (Azerbaijan) Eddy Israfilov | (Brazil) **Yago** | (Brazil) Heberty | (Brazil) **Marcos Guilherme** | (Spain) Ager Aketxe | (Spain) Andoni Zubiaurre | (Spain) Raúl Parra | (Spain) Samu Castillejo | (Spain) Teto | (Portugal) **Nené** | (South Korea) Park Jun-heong | (Philippines) Antonio Glauder | (Philippines) Óscar Arribas | (Australia) Shane Lowry (France) Enzo Lombardo (Spain) Celso Bermejo, (Spain) Miquel Cuesta (Bosnia and Herzegovina) **Ajdin Mujagić** (Brazil) Jairo | (Spain) Iker Undabarrena (Mali) Moussa Sidibé |
| Kelantan The Real Warriors | (Bulgaria) Damyan Damyanov | (Canada) Albert Kang | (England) Noel Mbo | (Italy) Sebastian Avanzini | (Ivory Coast) Alexandre Yeoulé | (Sierra Leone) Abdul Sesay | (Sierra Leone) Yusuf Sesay | (Sweden) Saifu Izamander | (Ivory Coast) **Gnohere Krizo** | (France) **Enzo Célestine** | (Indonesia) **Yohanes Kandaimu** | | (Bahrain) Habib Haroon | (Philippines) Simen Lyngbø | (Myanmar) Hein Htet Aung | | (Nigeria) Prince Aggreh, (Nigeria) Ifedayo Olusegun |
| Kuala Lumpur City | (Argentina) Enzo Cora | (Italy) Nicolao Dumitru | (Liberia) Kpah Sherman | (Spain) Gorka Larrucea | (Spain) Madger Gomes | (Spain) Víctor Ruiz | (Ukraine) Dmytro Lytvyn | | | | | | (Australia) Giancarlo Gallifuoco | (Philippines) Quincy Kammeraad | | | (Argentina) Manuel Hidalgo |
| Kuching City | (Bahrain) Moses Atede | (Cameroon) Ronald Ngah | (Jordan) **Ahmad Israiwah** | (Namibia) Petrus Shitembi | (Nigeria) James Okwuosa | (Cameroon) **Jerome Mpacko Etame** | | | | | | | (Japan) Yuki Tanigawa | (Philippines) Scott Woods | (Timor-Leste) João Pedro | (Ghana) Jordan Mintah (Note: Mintah successfully obtained Malaysian citizenship on 29 August 2025 after gone through naturalization process and will be registered as a local player going forward.) | |
| Melaka | (Brazil) Juan Douglas | (Brazil) Vitor Carvalho | (Montenegro) **Argzim Redžović** | (Bosnia and Herzegovina) **Dino Kalesic** | (South Korea) **Do Dong-hyun** | (South Korea) **Park Kwang-il** | (Ivory Coast) **Noel Agbre** | (Nigeria) Michael Onyekachi Ozor | (Egypt) **Ahmed Shamsaldin** | | | | (South Korea) Gu Dae-yeob | | | | (Philippines) Charles Dabao (Philippines) Justin Baas (Philippines) Jun Badelic (Brazil) Patrick Gama (Brazil) Anderson Brito (Brazil) Danilo Magalhães, (Ghana) Bernard Arthur, |
| Negeri Sembilan | (Bosnia and Herzegovina) Jovan Motika | (Equatorial Guinea) Luis Enrique Nsue | (England) **Anuar Ceesay** | (Ghana) Joseph Esso | (Japan) **Kei Oshiro** | (Japan) Mio Tsuneyasu | (Japan) Takumi Sasaki | (Japan) **Yūichi Hirano** | (Mongolia) Filip Chinzorig | (South Korea) An Sang-su | | | (Palestine) **Oday Kharoub** | (Myanmar) Wai Linn Aung | (Singapore) **Amirul Adli** | | (Ghana) Alex Agyarkwa |
| PDRM | (Nigeria) Elisha Kashim | (Jordan) Fadi Awad | | | | | | | | | | | (South Korea) Park Tae-soo | | | | (Jordan) Ahmad Israiwah (Ivory Coast) Noel Agbre (Ivory Coast) Bernard Doumbia |
| Penang | (Argentina) Stefano Brundo | (Australia) Dylan Wenzel-Halls | (Bosnia and Herzegovina) Danilo Šipovac | (Brazil) Bruno Suzuki | (Brazil) **Douglas Coutinho** | (Brazil) **Erick Brendon** | (Ivory Coast) Kipré Tchétché | (Nigeria) Faith Friday Obilor | (Jordan) **Fadi Awad** | (Afghanistan) **Omid Musawi** | | | (South Korea) Lim In-kyu | (Philippines) Kamil Amirul | (Philippines) OJ Porteria | | (Timor-Leste) Thiago Fernandes (Malawi) Limbikani Mzava |
| Sabah | (Brazil) Gabriel Peres | (Croatia) **Duje Ljubic** | (Spain) Cifu | (Spain) **José Ángel** | (France) **Chris Ondong Mba** | (New Zealand) Dane Ingham | (Haiti) **Kervens Belfort** | | | | | | (Australia) Dean Pelekanos | (Thailand) **Ernesto Phumipha** | | | (Bosnia and Herzegovina) Ajdin Mujagić |
| Selangor | (Brazil) Chrigor | (Brazil) **Vitor Pernambuco** | (Cape Verde) Alvin Fortes | (France) **Hugo Boumous** | (France) **Mahamé Siby** | (France) **Seif-Dine Hraoubia** | (Ghana) **Alex Agyarkwa** | (Ghana) Richmond Ankrah | (Jordan) Mo Abualnadi | (Jordan) Noor Al-Rawabdeh | (Senegal) **Mamadou Diarra** | (South Korea) **Jeon Seung-min** | (South Korea) **Kim Ji-ho** | (Singapore) **Safuwan Baharudin** | | | (Thailand) Kevin Deeromram, (Brazil) Willian Lira (Kosovo) **Toni Domgjoni**, (England) Zach Clough, (Thailand) Picha Autra (Afghanistan) Omid Musawi |
| Terengganu | (Brazil) Careca | (Brazil) Diego Landis | (Cameroon) Junior Ngong Sam | (Republic of the Congo) Yann Mabella | (Curaçao) **Gervane Kastaneer** | (Tajikistan) **Ehson Panjshanbe** | | | | | | | (Tajikistan) **Shervoni Mabatshoyev** | (Myanmar) Kyaw Min Oo | | | (Brazil) Gabriel Silva (Uzbekistan) Nurillo Tukhtasinov |

== Standings ==
=== League table ===
| Pos | Team | Pld | W | D | L | GF | GA | GD | Pts | Qualification or relegation |
|---|---|---|---|---|---|---|---|---|---|---|
| 1 | Johor Darul Ta'zim (C) | 24 | 23 | 1 | 0 | 117 | 10 | +107 | 70 | Qualification for the AFC Champions League Elite league stage & ASEAN Club Championship group stage |
| 2 | Kuching City | 24 | 16 | 5 | 3 | 45 | 14 | +31 | 53 | Qualification for the AFC Champions League Two group stage & ASEAN Club Championship group stage (Note: Since the winners of the 2025 Malaysia FA Cup, Johor Darul Ta'zim, had already qualified for the Champions League Elite via league position, the Champions League Two spot was passed to the second-placed team.) |
| 3 | Selangor | 24 | 16 | 4 | 4 | 59 | 20 | +39 | 52 | |
| 4 | Kuala Lumpur City | 24 | 12 | 7 | 5 | 40 | 29 | +11 | 43 | |
| 5 | Terengganu | 24 | 10 | 6 | 8 | 39 | 34 | +5 | 36 | |
| 6 | Immigration | 24 | 9 | 5 | 10 | 38 | 43 | −5 | 32 | |
| 7 | Negeri Sembilan | 24 | 6 | 11 | 7 | 39 | 35 | +4 | 29 | |
| 8 | Penang | 24 | 6 | 7 | 11 | 26 | 41 | −15 | 25 | |
| 9 | Sabah | 24 | 5 | 8 | 11 | 29 | 44 | −15 | 23 | |
| 10 | DPMM | 24 | 6 | 5 | 13 | 30 | 57 | −27 | 23 | Ineligible for AFC competition spots |
| 11 | Melaka | 24 | 4 | 7 | 13 | 18 | 45 | −27 | 19 | |
| 12 | Kelantan The Real Warriors (Note: Kelantan The Real Warriors failed to meet requirements for MFL club licensing approval.) | 24 | 4 | 3 | 17 | 17 | 63 | −46 | 15 | Ejected from Malaysian Super League |
| 13 | PDRM | 24 | 2 | 5 | 17 | 17 | 79 | −62 | 11 | Ejected from Malaysian Super League |

Updated to match(es) played on 17 May 2026. Source: Malaysian Football League
Rules for classification: 1) Points; 2) Goal difference; 3) Number of goals scored.
(C) Champions

== Results ==
| Home \ Away | DPM | IMI | JDT | KRW | KLC | KUC | MEL | NSE | PDRM | PEN | SAB | SEL | TER |
|---|---|---|---|---|---|---|---|---|---|---|---|---|---|
| DPMM | | 4–2 | 0–3 | 1–2 | 0–4 | 2–2 | 1–1 | 2–2 | 3–1 | 2–0 | 0–1 | 2–5 | 0–5 |
| Immigration | 3–1 | | 0–3 | 3–0 | 0–3 | 0–1 | 1–1 | 1–1 | 5–0 | 0–0 | 2–2 | 1–3 | 2–3 |
| Johor Darul Ta'zim | 10–0 | 5–0 | | 4–1 | 7–0 | 2–1 | 7–1 | 5–3 | 7–0 | 6–0 | 8–0 | 3–0 | 1–1 |
| Kelantan The Real Warriors | 0–3 | 1–1 | 1–14 | | 0–2 | 0–1 | 2–1 | 0–2 | 0–1 | 1–1 | 3–2 | 0–6 | 0–2 |
| Kuala Lumpur City | 4–0 | 4–2 | 0–4 | 2–1 | | 1–1 | 2–1 | 2–2 | 3–1 | 0–1 | 1–1 | 2–3 | 1–0 |
| Kuching City | 1–0 | 4–0 | 0–1 | 4–0 | 1–0 | | 4–0 | 2–0 | 4–1 | 1–1 | 2–0 | 1–0 | 2–1 |
| Melaka | 0–1 | 0–2 | 1–2 | 2–1 | 0–3 | 1–3 | | 2–0 | 3–0 | 1–1 | 1–0 | 0–0 | 1–2 |
| Negeri Sembilan | 2–2 | 1–2 | 0–1 | 2–1 | 1–1 | 2–2 | 0–0 | | 2–0 | 3–3 | 3–0 | 2–1 | 1–1 |
| PDRM | 2–2 | 0–5 | 0–7 | 3–1 | 1–1 | 0–5 | 0–0 | 1–6 | | 1–1 | 1–4 | 1–3 | 0–1 |
| Penang | 2–1 | 0–1 | 0–4 | 0–1 | 1–2 | 0–1 | 5–0 | 2–1 | 3–0 | | 0–0 | 1–5 | 0–3 |
| Sabah | 1–3 | 1–2 | 1–6 | 0–0 | 1–1 | 0–1 | 1–1 | 1–1 | 5–1 | 3–2 | | 1–2 | 0–1 |
| Selangor | 3–0 | 4–0 | 0–2 | 2–0 | 1–1 | 1–0 | 3–0 | 1–0 | 6–0 | 4–0 | 1–1 | | 5–2 |
| Terengganu | 1–0 | 1–3 | 0–5 | 4–1 | 0–1 | 1–1 | 4–0 | 2–2 | 2–2 | 0–2 | 1–3 | 1–1 | |

Updated to match(es) played on 16 May 2026. Source: MFL
Legend: Blue = home team win; Yellow = draw; Red = away team win.
For upcoming matches, an "a" indicates there is an article about the rivalry between the two participants.

== Season statistics ==
=== Top goalscorers ===
As of 17 May 2026

| Rank | Player | Team | Goals |
|---|---|---|---|
| 1 | (Brazil) Bérgson | Johor Darul Ta'zim | 27 |
| 2 | (Brazil) Chrigor | Selangor | 23 |
| 3 | (Brazil) Jairo | Johor Darul Ta'zim | 14 |
| 4 | (Malaysia) Safawi Rasid | Kuala Lumpur City | 13 |
| 4 | (Cameroon) Ronald Ngah | Kuching City | 13 |
| 6 | (Colombia) Wilmar Jordán | Immigration | 11 |
| 6 | (Bosnia and Herzegovina) Ajdin Mujagić | Johor Darul Ta'zim / Sabah | 11 |
| 8 | (Venezuela) Eduardo Sosa | Immigration | 10 |
| 8 | (Ghana) Joseph Esso | Negeri Sembilan | 10 |
| 8 | (Australia) Dylan Wenzel-Halls | Penang | 10 |
| 11 | (Australia) Jordan Murray | DPMM | 9 |
| 11 | (Argentina) Manuel Hidalgo | Johor Darul Ta'zim / Kuala Lumpur City | 9 |
| 11 | (Spain) Óscar Arribas | Johor Darul Ta'zim | 9 |
| 11 | (Cape Verde) Alvin Fortes | Selangor | 9 |
| 15 | (Bosnia and Herzegovina) Jovan Motika | Negeri Sembilan | 8 |
| 15 | (Brazil) Careca | Terengganu | 8 |

=== Top assists ===
As of 17 May 2026

| Rank | Player | Club | Assist |
|---|---|---|---|
| 1 | (Argentina) Manuel Hidalgo | Johor Darul Ta'zim | 14 |
| 2 | (Malaysia) Arif Aiman | Johor Darul Ta'zim | 11 |
| 2 | (Spain) Óscar Arribas | Johor Darul Ta'zim | 11 |
| 4 | (Malaysia) Ramadhan Saifullah | Kuching City | 10 |
| 5 | (Malaysia) Stuart Wilkin | Sabah / Johor Darul Ta'zim | 7 |
| 5 | (Cape Verde) Alvin Fortes | Selangor | 7 |
| 5 | (Malaysia) Faisal Halim | Selangor | 7 |
| 8 | (Argentina) Jonathan Silva | Johor Darul Ta'zim | 6 |
| 8 | (Malaysia) Afiq Fazail | Johor Darul Ta'zim | 6 |
| 8 | (Malaysia) Quentin Cheng | Selangor | 6 |

=== Hat-tricks ===
As of 17 May 2026

| Player | For | Against | Result | Date | Round |
|---|---|---|---|---|---|
| (Brazil) Chrigor | Selangor | Terengganu | 5–2 (H) | 27 August 2025 | 4 |
| (Brazil) Bérgson | Johor Darul Ta'zim | Sabah | 8–0 (H) | 21 September 2025 | 5 |
| (Brazil) João Figueiredo | Johor Darul Ta'zim | Sabah | 8–0 (H) | 21 September 2025 | 5 |
| (Brazil) Bérgson^{4} | Johor Darul Ta'zim | (Brunei) DPMM | 10–0 (H) | 25 October 2025 | 8 |
| (Brazil) Jairo | Johor Darul Ta'zim | Terengganu | 5–0 (A) | 31 October 2025 | 9 |
| (Cameroon) Ronald Ngah | Kuching City | PDRM | 5–0 (A) | 1 November 2025 | 9 |
| (Brazil) Chrigor | Selangor | Penang | 5–1 (A) | 7 December 2025 | 11 |
| (Brazil) Chrigor^{4} | Selangor | (Brunei) DPMM | 5–2 (A) | 10 January 2026 | 15 |
| (Brazil) Chrigor | Selangor | Kelantan The Real Warriors | 6–0 (A) | 24 April 2026 | 23 |
| (Cameroon) Jerome Etame | Kuching City | Melaka | 3–1 (A) | 9 May 2026 | 25 |
| (Brazil) Bérgson^{6} | Johor Darul Ta'zim | Kelantan The Real Warriors | 14–1 (A) | 10 May 2026 | 25 |
| (Argentina) Manuel Hidalgo | Johor Darul Ta'zim | Kelantan The Real Warriors | 14–1 (A) | 10 May 2026 | 25 |
| (Malaysia) Mukhairi Ajmal | Selangor | PDRM | 6–0 (H) | 17 May 2026 | 26 |

Notes

^{4} Player scored 4 goals
^{5} Player scored 5 goals
^{6} Player scored 6 goals
(H) – Home team
(A) – Away team

=== Clean sheets ===
As of 17 May 2026

| Rank | Player | Team | Clean sheets |
|---|---|---|---|
| 1 | (Malaysia) Syihan Hazmi | Johor Darul Ta'zim | 16 |
| 2 | (Malaysia) Haziq Nadzli | Kuching City | 12 |
| 3 | (Philippines) Quincy Kammeraad | Kuala Lumpur | 8 |
| 4 | (Malaysia) Kalamullah Al-Hafiz | Selangor | 7 |
| 5 | (Malaysia) Ramadhan Hamid | Penang | 6 |
| 6 | (Malaysia) Zarif Irfan | Immigration | 5 |
| 7 | (Malaysia) Azri Ghani | Negeri Sembilan | 4 |
| 7 | (Malaysia) Sikh Izhan Nazrel | Selangor | 4 |
| 7 | (Malaysia) Rahadiazli Rahalim | Terengganu | 4 |
| 7 | (Malaysia) Suhaimi Husin | Terengganu | 4 |

=== Discipline ===
As of 17 May 2026

==== Player ====
- Most yellow cards: 6
  - (Spain) Antonio Glauder (Johor Darul Ta'zim)
  - (Malaysia) Danial Haqim (Kelantan The Real Warriors)
  - (Malaysia) Alif Naqiuddin (PDRM)
  - (Malaysia) Adib Ra'op (Penang)
  - (Malaysia) Dominic Tan (Sabah)
  - (New Zealand) Dane Ingham (Sabah)
- Most red cards: 2
  - (Malaysia) Fairuz Zakaria (DPMM FC)
  - (Malaysia) Adib Ra'op (Penang)

==== Club ====
- Most red cards: 7
  - DPMM FC
- Most yellow cards: 56
  - Sabah
- Fewest yellow cards: 29
  - Selangor
- Fewest red cards: 1
  - Kuala Lumpur City
  - Melaka
  - PDRM
  - Selangor

== See also ==
- 2025 Piala Sumbangsih
- 2025–26 Malaysia A1 Semi-Pro League
- 2025–26 Malaysia A2 Amateur League
- 2025–26 Malaysia A3 Community League
- 2025 Malaysia FA Cup
- 2026 Malaysia Cup
- 2026 MFL Challenge Cup
- 2025–26 Piala Presiden
- 2025–26 Piala Belia
