= Haziq Aiman =

Malaysian footballer

Muhammad Haziq Aiman
Personal information
- Full name: Muhammad Haziq Aiman bin Mohd Esa
- Date of birth: 19 January 2005 (age 21)
- Place of birth: Johor Bahru, Malaysia
- Height: 1.92 m (6 ft 3 1/2 in)
- Position: Goalkeeper

Team information
- Current team: Kuching City

Youth career
- Johor Darul Ta'zim III

Senior career*
Years	Team	Apps	(Gls)
2024–2026	Johor Darul Ta'zim II		
2025	→ Melaka (loan)		
2026–	Kuching City		

International career
2023–2024	Malaysia U19	6	(0)
2025–	Malaysia U23		
- * Club domestic league appearances and goals

Muhammad Haziq Aiman bin Mohd Esa (born 19 January 2005) is a Malaysian professional footballer who plays as a goalkeeper for Malaysia Super League club Kuching City, on loan from Johor Darul Ta'zim II.

== Club career ==
=== Johor Darul Ta'zim II ===
Haziq started his career with Johor Darul Ta'zim III. He played in the Piala Presiden tournament. Haziq successfully won the 2024–25 Piala Presiden by defeating Selangor U20 with an aggregate of 2–1 in the final match.

After that he was promoted to Johor Darul Ta'zim II who played in the MFL Cup. He has made several appearances. In the tournament, Haziq once again lifted the trophy by winning the 2024–25 MFL Cup.

=== Melaka ===
On 16 July 2025, Melaka signed Haziq from Johor Darul Ta'zim II to compete in the 2025–26 Malaysia Super League. He is the youngest in the Melaka squad 2025–26 season and is part of the prospect for the national squad.

== International career ==
=== Youth ===
In July 2024, Haziq was called up by the Malaysia U19 national squad to participate in the 2024 ASEAN U-19 Boys Championship tournament held in Indonesia. After winning Group C, Malaysia U19 advanced to the semi-finals but lost 1–0 to the hosts and failed to reach the final.

In September 2024, Haziq was selected by the Malaysia U19 national squad to compete in the 2025 AFC U-20 Asian Cup qualification tournament held in Tajikistan. In the match, Malaysia U19 was drawn in Group E with the hosts Tajikistan, North Korea, Oman and Sri Lanka. However, Malaysia U19 did not make it to the final round after finishing fourth in the group.

On 14 July 2025, Haziq was listed by the coach to face the 2025 ASEAN U-23 Championship campaign. After a few months, in September 2025 he was also selected for the 2026 AFC U-23 Asian Cup qualification which was held in Pathum Thani, Thailand.

=== Senior ===
In October 2024, Haziq was listed in training for a friendly match against New Zealand in Auckland. However, he was not included in the first team squad and was not used in the match. The match ended in a 4–0 defeat.

In December 2024, Haziq once again received a call-up from the national squad and was listed to compete in the tournament 2024 ASEAN Championship. Throughout the tournament, he was not used in any matches and was only a reserve player. In the tournament, Malaysia failed to advance past the group stage and failed to advance to the next round.

== Honours ==
JDT III

- Piala Presiden: 2024–25

JDT II

- MFL Cup: 2024–25
