= Paya Rumput =

Town in Malacca, Malaysia

- Suburb of Malacca City
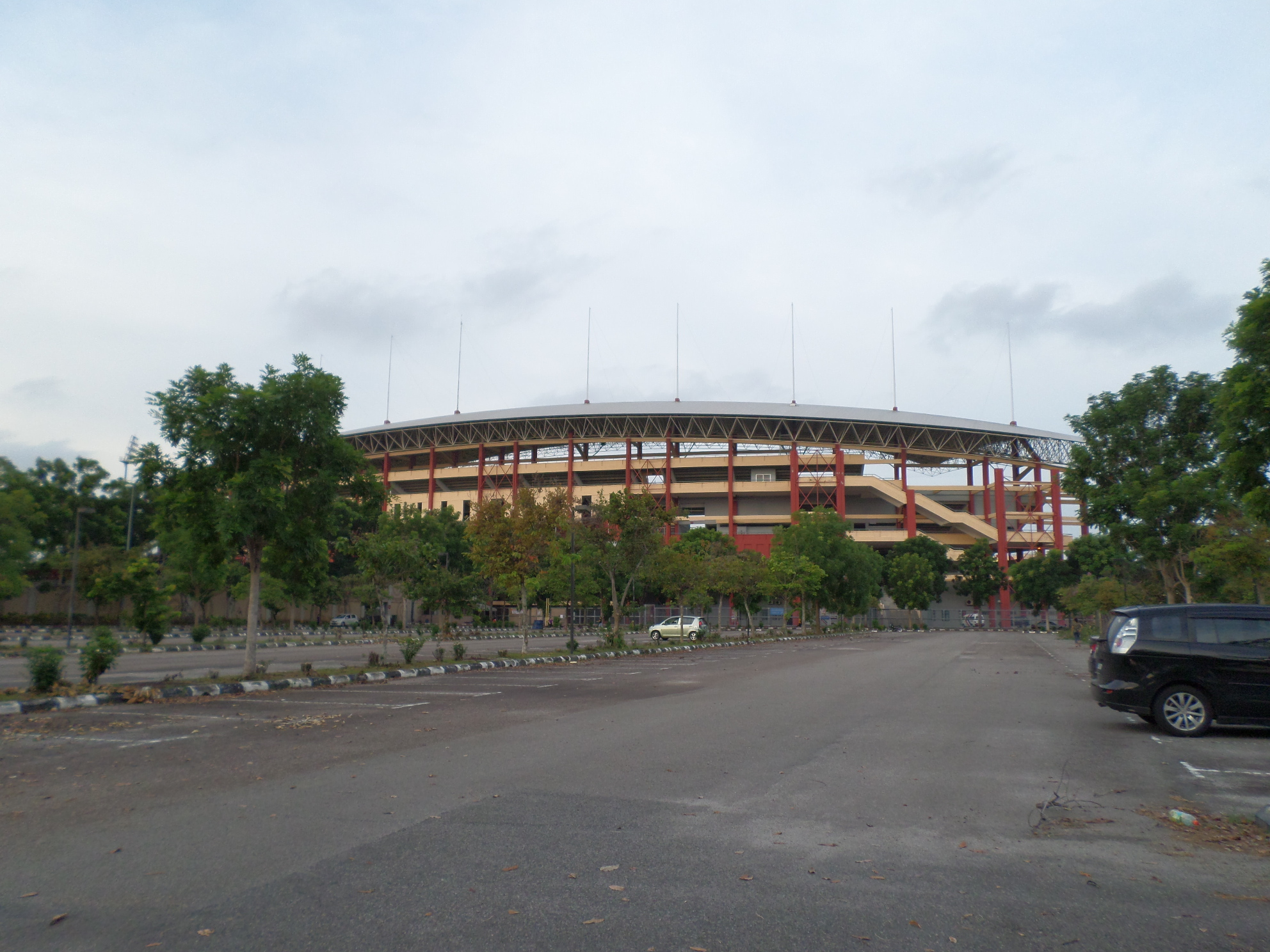
- Hang Jebat Stadium
- Interactive map of Paya Rumput
- Coordinates: 2°17′N 102°13′E
- Country: Malaysia
- State: Malacca
- City: Malacca City
- District: Melaka Tengah

Area
  - Total: 13.8 km^{2} (5.3 sq mi)
  - Suburb: 13.7 km^{2} (5.3 sq mi)
  - Town: 0.1 km^{2} (0.039 sq mi)

Population
  - Total: 19,716
  - Density: 1,430/km^{2} (3,700/sq mi)
- Postal code: 75450

Paya Rumput is a town in Melaka Tengah District, Malacca, Malaysia. It has few residential areas including Taman Paya Rumput Perdana, Taman Paya Rumput Indah, Taman Paya Rumput Utama, Taman Seri Paya Rumput, Taman Rumput Jaya, Taman Permai Indah and Taman Paya Emas, as well as a namesake Light Industrial Area. The town is notable for being the location of the main sports hub of Malacca State – Hang Jebat Stadium.

== Economy ==
- Paya Rumput Light Industrial Area
  - GJH Holdings Sdn Bhd
  - Honesteel Sdn Bhd

== Education ==
Primary Schools

- Paya Rumput National Primary School
- Pay Fong National Type Chinese Primary School
- Paya Rumput National Type Tamil Primary School

Secondary schools

- Paya Rumput National Secondary School

== Religious sites ==
- Malacca Chinese Mosque - A mosque dedicated for the State's Chinese Muslims located within the Hang Jebat Sports Complex.

== Sports and Recreation ==
- Hang Jebat Sports Complex - The main sports hub of the State with Hang Jebat Stadium as its centrepiece.
  - Hang Jebat Stadium (Main stadium)
  - 10 Football Field Complex (State Football Association Headquarters)
  - Hang Jebat Aquatic Centre (Aquatic Centre equipped with Swimming and Diving pools)
  - Hang Jebat Equestrian Centre (Centre for Equine Sports like Polo, equipped with stables for horses)
  - Hang Jebat Lawn Bowl Centre
  - Hang Jebat Squash Centre
  - Malacca State Sports Council Headquarters
  - Ministry of Youth and Sports Community Sports Complex

== Tourist attractions ==
- Masbro Village - English-style lodging with triangular-shaped rooms.

== See also ==
- Krubong
