= Gu Dae-yeob =

South Korean footballer (born 1992)

Personal information
- Full name: Gu Dae-yeob
- Date of birth: 17 November 1992 (age 33)
- Place of birth: South Korea
- Height: 1.84 m (6 ft 1/2 in)
- Position: Centre-back

Team information
- Current team: Melaka
- Number: 37

Youth career
- 2003–2004: Gumi Bisan Elementary School
- 2005–2007: Jangpyung Middle School
- 2008–2010: Andong High School
- 2011: Howon University
- 2012: Gwangju University

Senior career*
Years	Team	Apps	(Gls)
2012–2015	Andong		
2015–2017	Gwangju		
2017–2019	Seoul E-Land FC		
2019–2021	FC Mokpo		
2021–2022	Gyeongju Citizen FC		
2022–2024	Cheonan City FC		
2025	Hwaseong FC		
2025	Gyeongju KHNP		
2025–	Melaka		
- * Club domestic league appearances and goals

- Gu Dae-yeob
- Hangul: 구대엽
- RR: Gu Daeyeop
- MR: Ku Taeyŏp

Gu Dae-yeob (Korean: 구대엽; born 17 November 1993) is a South Korean professional footballer who currently plays as a centre-back for the Malaysia Super League club Melaka.

== Club career ==
In August 2025, Dae-yeob signed a contract with Melaka FC. He has made several appearances in the Malaysian Super League and other cups.
