= Patrick Gama =

Brazilian footballer

Personal information
- Full name: Patrick Gama Thomaz
- Date of birth: 27 July 2000 (age 26)
- Place of birth: Porto Velho, Brazil
- Height: 1.85 m (6 ft 1 in)
- Position: Midfielder

Team information
- Current team: Galvez Esporte Clube

Youth career
- Porto Velho EC
- Real Ariquemes
- Vilhenense U20

Senior career*
Years	Team	Apps	(Gls)
2020–2023	Vilhenense	17	(1)
2023	Tupynambás	8	(0)
2023	Santa Helena		
2024	ADESG	4	(1)
2024	Ji-Paraná		
2024–2025	The Cong-Viettel	1	(0)
2025	Melaka	6	(0)
2026–	Galvez Esporte Clube	0	(0)
- * Club domestic league appearances and goals as of 14 September 2025

Patrick Gama Thomaz (born 27 July 2000 in Porto Velho) is a Brazilian professional footballer who currently plays as a midfielder for Malaysia Super League club Melaka.

== Club career ==
Patrick began his career with Vilhenense U20. In 2022, he won his first trophy in the Campeonato Rondoniense Second Division.

On May 4, 2023, he signed a contract with the club Tupynambás. Patrick has made several appearances for the club. In the same year, he also played with Santa Helena on a free transfer.

In 2024, Patrick signed a contract with ADESG. However, after that, it didn't last long. In the same year, he signed and played with the club Ji-Paraná.

In January 2025, Patrick joined The Cong-Viettel from Ji-Paraná to face 2024–25 season. He did not last long while playing with the Vietnamese club due to his long-term injury.

In August 2025, Patrick signed a contract with Melaka for free. He made his debut in the 2025–26 Super League match against Penang and the result ended 1-1.

== Honours ==
=== Club ===
Vilhenense

- Campeonato Rondoniense Second Division: 2022
