= Juan Douglas =

Brazilian footballer (born 1995)

Personal information
- Full name: Juan Douglas Teles Da Silva
- Date of birth: 9 August 1995 (age 31)
- Place of birth: Manacapuru, Brazil
- Height: 1.80 m (5 ft 11 in)
- Position: Forward

Team information
- Current team: Persijap Jepara
- Number: 9

Youth career
- Itaberaí U20

Senior career*
Years	Team	Apps	(Gls)
2012	Itaberaí		
2013	ASEEV		
2014	CRAC		
2015	Itaberaí		
2016	Tubarão		
2016	Umuarama		
2017	Operário	1	(0)
2018–2019	Princesa do Solimões	1	(0)
2020–2024	Vaca Díez	33	(16)
2024	CDT Real Oruro	0	(0)
2025	Independência	13	(3)
2025–2026	Melaka	10	(4)
2026–	Persijap Jepara	8	(2)
- * Club domestic league appearances and goals as of 30 October 2026

Juan Douglas Teles Da Silva (born 9 August 1995) is a Brazilian professional footballer who plays as a forward for Super League club Persijap Jepara.

== Club career ==
=== Independência ===
In early 2025, Douglas joined Independência. He won the trophy with Independência at the tournament Campeonato Acreano. He managed to score 1 goal during the final match against Galvez. The result ended with a 3–1 victory.

=== Melaka ===
In August 2025, Douglas signed contract with Melaka from Independência on a free transfer. He made his debut and score first goal for Melaka in the opening match of the 2025–26 Malaysia Super League against Penang.

== Honours ==
=== Club ===
Vaca Díez

- Copa Simón Bolívar: 2022

Independência

- Campeonato Acreano: 2025
