= Syahir Rashid =

Malaysian footballer (born 2001)

Personal information
- Full name: Muhammad Syahir bin Abd Rashid
- Date of birth: 31 January 2001 (age 25)
- Place of birth: Kelantan, Malaysia
- Height: 1.77 m (5 ft 10 in)
- Position: Midfielder

Team information
- Current team: Melaka

Youth career
- 2019–2021: Kelantan U20
- 2023–2024: Kelantan United U23

Senior career*
Years	Team	Apps	(Gls)
2021–23	Kelantan	12	
2024–26	Kelantan The Real Warriors	25	(2)
2026–	Melaka		
- * Club domestic league appearances and goals as of 3 October 2025

Muhammad Syahir bin Abd Rashid (born 31 January 2001) is a Malaysian professional footballer who plays as a midfielder for Malaysia Super League club Kelantan The Real Warriors.

== Club career ==
Syahir was the captain of Kelantan Darul Naim II that played in 2024–25 MFL Cup. Syahir also made appearances for the first team in 2024–25 Malaysia Super League.

== Career statistics ==
=== Club ===
As of match played 3 October 2025

Appearances and goals by club, season and competition
Club	Season	League			Cup		League Cup		Continental/Other		Total	
Club	Season	Division	Apps	Goals	Apps	Goals	Apps	Goals	Apps	Goals	Apps	Goals
Kelantan The Real Warriors	2024–25	Malaysia Super League	20	2	0	0	2	0	2 (Note: Appearances in MFL Challenge Cup)	0	24	2
Kelantan The Real Warriors	2025–26	Malaysia Super League	5	0	1 (Note: Appearances in Malaysia FA Cup)	0	0	0	–	–	6	0
Kelantan The Real Warriors	Total		25	2	1	0	2	0	2	0	30	2
Career Total			0	0	0	0	0	0	–	–	0	0
