= Anderson Brito =

Brazilian footballer (born 2001)

Personal information
- Full name: Anderson Brito de Arruda
- Date of birth: 27 November 2001 (age 24)
- Place of birth: Brazil
- Height: 1.72 m (5 ft 8 in)
- Position: Winger

Team information
- Current team: Galvez Esporte Clube

Senior career*
Years	Team	Apps	(Gls)
2020–2022	Retrô		
2022	→ FC SKA (loan)		
2022	→ Ipojuca (loan)		
2023	Maguary	6	(0)
2023	Rio Branco		
2023	Torres Brasil		
2024	Humaitá	11	(3)
2024	Ipojuca		
2025	Independência	15	(7)
2025	Melaka	4	(0)
2026–	Galvez Esporte Clube	0	(0)
- * Club domestic league appearances and goals as of 23 August 2025

Anderson Brito de Arruda (born 27 November 2001), simply known as Anderson Brito, is a Brazilian professional footballer who plays winger for Malaysia Super League club Melaka.

== Club career ==
=== Independência ===
In January 2025, Brito joined Independência. He has managed to win the Campeonato Acreano with Independência for the 2025 season.

=== Melaka ===
In August 2025, Melaka signed Brito from Independência on a free transfer. He made his debut for Melaka in the opening match of the 2025–26 Malaysia Super League against Penang.

== Honours ==
Independência

- Campeonato Acreano: 2025
