= Che Rashid =

Malaysian footballer

Personal information
- Full name: Che Rashid bin Che Halim
- Date of birth: 17 December 1994 (age 31)
- Place of birth: Mersing, Johor, Malaysia
- Height: 1.76 m (5 ft 9 1/2 in)
- Position: Right-back

Team information
- Current team: Melaka
- Number: 2

Youth career
- 2013: Johor Darul Ta'zim IV

Senior career*
Years	Team	Apps	(Gls)
2013–2014	Johor Darul Ta'zim	0	(0)
2014	→ Johor Darul Ta'zim II (loan)	23	(0)
2015–2018	Johor Darul Ta'zim II	78	(4)
2019–2022	Johor Darul Ta'zim	0	(0)
2021	→ Melaka United (loan)	10	(0)
2022	→ Negeri Sembilan (loan)	22	(0)
2023–2025	Negeri Sembilan	40	(0)
2025–	Melaka	1	(0)

International career^{‡}
2015–	Malaysia	1	(0)
- * Club domestic league appearances and goals as of 15 August 2025 ‡ National team caps and goals as of 1 January 2016

Che Rashid bin Che Halim (born 17 December 1994) is a Malaysian professional footballer who plays as a right-back for Melaka in the Malaysia Super League.

== Club career ==
Che Rashid started his career with Johor Darul Ta'zim President's Cup team in 2013. After showing promising performances with youth team, he was loaned to Johor Darul Ta'zim II for 2014 Malaysia Premier League season.

On 2015 season, Che Rashid was promoted to Johor Darul Ta'zim II senior squad. He made 20 appearances during his season debut.

In 2022 he joined the team Negeri Sembilan FC. Has been with the team for one year and has been a key player throughout 2022. He has helped the team secure fourth place in the Malaysia Super League in 2022. It is an impressive achievement as the team has just been promoted from the Malaysia Premier League in the previous year and had shocked the other Malaysia Super League teams because Negeri Sembilan FC was considered an underdog team. He has made 22 appearances during his time with Negeri Sembilan FC .

== International career ==
Che Rashid received his national called up by Harimau Malaya coach, Dollah Salleh for the friendly match against Oman national football team.

He also was called up to the Malaysia U-23 team in preparation for the upcoming tournament in Singapore in June 2015.

== International appearances ==
#	Date	Venue	Opponent	Score	Result	Competition
1	26 March 2015	Al-Seeb Stadium, Oman	Oman	0	0–6 (L)	Friendly
