= Azim Rahim =

Malaysian footballer

Personal information
- Full name: Abdul Azim bin Rahim
- Date of birth: 1 January 1997 (age 29)
- Place of birth: Malacca, Malaysia
- Height: 1.70 m (5 ft 7 in)
- Positions: Forward; winger

Team information
- Current team: UM-Damansara United
- Number: 28

Youth career
- 2016: Felda United U21

Senior career*
Years	Team	Apps	(Gls)
2017	Petaling Jaya Rangers		(2)
2018	Felcra	13	(1)
2019	Felda United	13	(1)
2020–2021	Kuala Lumpur City	13	(2)
2021	→ Penang (loan)	6	(1)
2022	Penang	14	(0)
2023	Immigration	22	(24)
2024–	Melaka	26	(22)
2026–	→ UM-Damansara United (loan)	0	(0)
- * Club domestic league appearances and goals as of 14 August 2025

Abdul Azim bin Rahim (born 1 January 1997) is a Malaysian professional footballer who plays as a forward for Malaysia Super League club Melaka.

== Career statistics ==
As of 29 August 2021

Appearances and goals by club, season and competition
Club	Season	League			Cup		League Cup		Continental			
Club	Season	Division	Apps	Goals	Apps	Goals	Apps	Goals	Apps	Goals	Apps	Goals
Felcra	2018	Malaysia Premier League	13	1	0	0	5	4	–		18	5
Felcra	Total		13	1	0	0	5	4	–		18	5
Felda United	2019	Malaysia Super League	13	1	4	2	0	0	–		17	3
Felda United	Total		13	1	4	2	0	0	–		17	3
Kuala Lumpur City	2020	Malaysia Premier League	8	2	0	0	0	0	–		8	2
Kuala Lumpur City	2021	Malaysia Super League	5	0	0	0	0	0	–		5	0
Kuala Lumpur City	Total		13	2	0	0	0	0	–		13	2
Penang (loan)	2021	Malaysia Super League	5	1	0	0	0	0	–		5	1
Penang (loan)	Total		5	1	0	0	0	0	–		5	1

== Honours ==
=== Club ===
Immigration FC

- Malaysia M3 League: 2023

Melaka FC

- Malaysia A1 Semi-Pro League: 2024–25

=== Individual ===
- Malaysia M3 League Top Scorer: 2023
- Malaysia A1 Semi-Pro League Top Scorer: 2024–25
