= Vitor Carvalho (footballer, born 1993) =

Brazilian footballer (born 1993)

Personal information
- Full name: Vitor Francisco dos Santos de Carvalho
- Date of birth: 17 February 1993 (age 33)
- Place of birth: Brazil
- Height: 1.92 m (6 ft 4 in)
- Position: Centre-back

Youth career
- 2011: América-SP U18
- 2012: Sport Recife U20

Senior career*
Years	Team	Apps	(Gls)
2014	Grêmio Catanduvense	14	(0)
2015	→ S.C. Covilhã (loan)	6	(0)
2016–2017	PSTC	14	(0)
2017	Itabaiana		
2018	Anápolis	10	(0)
2020	União	4	(0)
2021	Capital CF	8	(0)
2022	S.C. Covilhã	4	(0)
2022–2023	Sioni Bolnisi	17	(0)
2023	KF Oriku	12	(1)
2023–2024	S.U. 1º Dezembro		
2024	Costa Rica	9	(0)
2025	Moto Club	12	(1)
2025–2026	Melaka	11	(0)
- * Club domestic league appearances and goals as of February 2025

Vitor Francisco dos Santos de Carvalho (born 17 February 1993) is a Brazilian professional footballer who plays as a centre-back.

== Career ==
In August 2025, Carvalho signed a contract with Melaka, who had just been promoted to the Malaysia Super League. He made his debut for Melaka in the opening match of the Super League against Penang, which ended in a 1–1 draw.
