= Nizaruddin Jazi =

Malaysian footballer (born 2000)

Muhammad Nizaruddin Jazi
Personal information
- Full name: Muhammad Nizaruddin bin Jazi
- Date of birth: 12 February 2000 (age 26)
- Place of birth: Malacca, Malaysia
- Height: 1.69 m (5 ft 6 1/2 in)
- Position: Central midfielder

Team information
- Current team: Melaka
- Number: 80

Youth career
- Melaka FA U21

Senior career*
Years	Team	Apps	(Gls)
2018	Melaka United		
2019–2022	UiTM		
2023–2024	Johor Darul Ta'zim II		
2024–	Melaka		

International career
2015–2016	Malaysia U16	5	(2)
2017–2019	Malaysia U19	6	(1)
Medal record
Men's football
Representing Malaysia
AFF U-19 Youth Championship
First place	2018 Indonesia
- * Club domestic league appearances and goals

Muhammad Nizaruddin bin Jazi (born 12 December 2000 in Malacca) is a Malaysian professional footballer who currently plays as a central midfielder for Malaysia Super League club Melaka.

== Club career ==
=== Melaka United ===
In 2018, Nizaruddin started his career with the youth squad of Melaka United. He played in the Piala Presiden tournament with the Melaka FA U21 team. After that, he was promoted to the main squad of Melaka United in the Malaysia Super League.

=== UiTM ===
In 2019, Nizaruddin signed a contract with club UiTM. On 22 October 2019, he was listed as the youngest player to play in the 2019 Malaysia Cup by the Malaysian Football League.

=== Johor Darul Ta'zim II ===
In 2023, Johor Darul Ta'zim II has signed Nizaruddin to compete in the MFL Cup.

=== Melaka ===
In 2024, Nizaruddin joined Melaka and became the champion of the 2024–25 Malaysia A1 Semi-Pro League.

== International career ==
=== Youth ===
Nizaruddin has represented Malaysia at youth levels from the Malaysia 16 to the Malaysia U19. He started by participating in the Mencari Ramli program at the age of 15. He was selected for the Malaysia U16 squad to compete in the 2015 China-ASEAN International Youth Football Tournament and became the champion.

In July 2016, Nizaruddin was selected for the 2016 AFF U-16 Youth Championship. He managed to score 2 goals against Myanmar U16 in the 85th minute and Australia U16 in the 29th minute. However, Malaysia U16 were stranded in the group stage and failed to advance to the next stage.

In July 2018, Nizaruddin was selected for the 2018 AFF U-19 Youth Championship. He scored 1 goal against Brunei U19 in the 12th minute. Malaysia U19 managed to advance to the final and became champions for the first time, defeating Myanmar U19 with a score of 4-3.

== Honours ==
Malaysia U19

- ASEAN U-19 Boys' Championship: 2018

Melaka

- Malaysia A1 Semi-Pro League: 2024–25
