= Charles Dabao =

Filipino footballer (born 1997)

Personal information
- Full name: Charles Ralph Allan Villahermosa Dabao III
- Date of birth: 30 September 1996 (age 30)
- Place of birth: San Pedro, Laguna, Philippines
- Height: 1.77 m (5 ft 10 in)
- Position: Full-back

Team information
- Current team: Manila Digger
- Number: 30

College career
Years	Team	Apps	(Gls)
- University of St. La Salle

Senior career*
Years	Team	Apps	(Gls)
2021–2025	Dynamic Herb Cebu	44	(0)
2025	Melaka	1	(0)
2026–	Manila Digger	2	(0)
- * Club domestic league appearances and goals as of 10:41, 03 March 2026 (UTC)

Charles Ralph Allan Villahermosa Dabao III (born 30 September 1997) is a Filipino professional footballer who plays as a left-back for Manila Digger of the Philippines Football League.

== Personal life ==
Dabao was born in San Pedro in the province of Laguna, but played youth football mainly in Negros. He studied at Holy Cross High School in Dumaguete, before pursuing his college education at University of St. La Salle in Bacolod.

== Career ==
=== Youth career ===
While at St. La Salle Dabao played for the university's football team, then sponsored by Ceres Transport, winning collegiate titles in both NOPSSCEA (Negros Occidental Private Schools Sports Cultural Educational Association) and PRISAA (Private Schools Athletic Association) competitions. At the 2015 PFF U-22 Amateur Championships, he represented the Negros Occidental Regional Football Association.

=== Dynamic Herb Cebu ===
In 2021, Dabao was one of the first signings of Dynamic Herb Cebu, a new team entering the Philippines Football League. He played in the club's opening campaign in the 2021 Copa Paulino Alcantara, where Cebu finished fourth.

Dabao would stay at Cebu for four years, first representing the club in its first Philippines Football League season. In 2024, he also played with Cebu in the club's campaign in the AFC Champions League Two. In 2025, he played in the PFL Finals Series as Cebu beat Manila Digger to clinch their first piece of a silverware as a club.

=== Melaka ===
At the end of the 2024–25 PFL season Dabao departed the club, moving abroad to Melaka of the Malaysia Super League alongside his teammate Jun Badelic. In Malaysia, however, he made only one appearance against Penang before leaving the club midseason.

=== Manila Digger ===
Dabao returned to the Philippines in early 2026, this time signing for Manila Digger ahead of their campaign in the knockout rounds of the AFC Challenge League. He made his debut in a win over Valenzuela PB–Mendiola.

== Honors ==
Manila Digger

- Philippines Football League: 2025–26
