= Firdaus Irman =

Malaysian footballer

Personal information
- Full name: Muhammad Firdaus Irman bin Mohd Fadhil
- Date of birth: 23 July 2001 (age 25)
- Place of birth: Pulau Pinang, Malaysia
- Height: 1.87 m (6 ft 2 in)
- Position: Goalkeeper

Team information
- Current team: Melaka
- Number: 29

Youth career
- Sekolah Sukan Tunku Mahkota Ismail

Senior career*
Years	Team	Apps	(Gls)
2020–2021	Selangor FC II		
2022	PDRM	8	(0)
2023	Negeri Sembilan		
2024–2025	Perak		
2025–	Melaka	0	(0)

International career
2016	Malaysia U16	1	(0)
2022–	Malaysia U23	1	(0)
- * Club domestic league appearances and goals

Muhammad Firdaus Irman bin Mohd Fadhil (born 23 July 2001), is a Malaysian professional footballer who plays as a goalkeeper. He played for Malaysian Super League side, Melaka.

== Club career ==
He was officially announced as a new Negeri Sembilan player on 14 January 2023. On 14 August 2023, he made his debut for Negeri Sembilan in a home match against Selangor, which ended as a 0–4 loss.

== International career ==
On 22 September 2016, at age of 15, Firdaus made his first debut for Malaysia U16 in 2016 AFC U-16 Championship match against South Korea U16. At under-23 level, he commonly started as substitute goalkeeper.
