= Park Kwang-il =

South Korean footballer

Personal information
- Full name: Park Kwang-il
- Date of birth: 10 February 1991 (age 35)
- Place of birth: South Korea
- Height: 1.73 m (5 ft 8 in)
- Position: Central midfielder

Team information
- Current team: Melaka
- Number: 91

Youth career
- 2009–2012: Yonsei University

Senior career*
Years	Team	Apps	(Gls)
2013–2015	Matsumoto Yamaga	18	(1)
2014	→ Pune City (loan)	8	(0)
2015	→ Mito HollyHock (loan)	2	(0)
2016	Ehime	12	(0)
2017	PKNS	5	(0)
2018	Jeonnam Dragons	13	(0)
2019–2022	Gyeongnam	32	(1)
2019–2020	→ Jinju Citizen (loan)	27	(1)
2023	Gimpo FC	32	(2)
2024–2025	Seongnam FC	38	(0)
2026–	Melaka	1	(0)

International career
2006	South Korea U-17	0	(0)
2009	South Korea U-20	3	(0)
2012	South Korea U-23	4	(1)
- * Club domestic league appearances and goals as of 6 January 2026

- Park Kwang-il
- Hangul: 박광일
- Hanja: 朴光一
- RR: Bak Gwangil
- MR: Pak Kwangil

Park Kwang-il (Korean: 박광일; born 10 February 1991) is a South Korean footballer who plays as a midfielder for Seongnam FC.

== Club statistics ==
Updated to 28 July 2017.

Club performance			League		Cup		Total	
Season	Club	League	Apps	Goals	Apps	Goals	Apps	Goals
Country			League		Emperor's Cup		Total	
2013	Matsumoto Yamaga	J2 League	17	1	0	0	17	1
2014	Matsumoto Yamaga	J2 League	1	0	0	0	1	0
2014	FC Pune City	ISL	8	0	—		8	0
2015	Mito HollyHock	J2 League	2	0	1	0	3	0
2016	Ehime	J2 League	12	0	0	0	12	0
2017	PKNS	Liga Super	5	0	0	0	5	0
Career total			45	1	1	0	46	1
