= Simen Lyngbø =

Filipino footballer (born 1998)

Personal information
- Full name: Simen Alexander Santos Lyngbø
- Date of birth: 18 February 1998 (age 28)
- Place of birth: Bærum, Norway
- Height: 1.80 m (5 ft 11 in)
- Position: Right-back

Team information
- Current team: Melaka
- Number: 3

Youth career
- Stabæk
- Bærum

Senior career*
Years	Team	Apps	(Gls)
2014–2019	Bærum 2	35	(18)
2018–2019	Bærum	25	(11)
2020–2021	ADT	5	(2)
2021–2022	Ready	4	(1)
2022	United City	7	(3)
2023–2024	Persik Kediri	25	(1)
2024	One Taguig	6	(0)
2025	Nongbua Pitchaya	15	(0)
2025–2026	Kelantan TRW	21	(3)
2026–	Melaka	16	(0)

International career^{‡}
2022–	Philippines	6	(0)
- * Club domestic league appearances and goals as of 20 September 2025 ‡ National team caps and goals as of 26 March 2024

Simen Alexander Santos Lyngbø (born 18 February 1998) is a professional footballer who plays as a right-back for Malaysia Super League club Melaka. Born in Norway, he represents the Philippines at international level.

== Club career ==
=== Youth ===
Born in Bærum, Norway, Lyngbø started his youth career at Stabæk Fotball and Bærum.

=== Bærum ===
In 2017, Lyngbø was promoted to the senior team of Bærum. He made his debut for Baerum in a 1–0 home win over Oppsal in the Norwegian Football Cup.

=== Azkals Development Team ===
Before the 2020 season, Lyngbø signed for Philippines Football League club Azkals Development Team. Lyngbø made his Philippines Football League debut in a 1–0 defeat against defending champions United City.

=== Ready ===
In 2021, he left the Azkals Development Team and joined 3. divisjon club Ready.

=== United City ===
Lyngbø returned to the Philippines in March 2022 and signed for United City, seeking a chance to play in the AFC Champions League.

=== Persik Kediri ===
In May 2023, Lyngbø decided to move to another Southeast Asian country and signed a contract with Indonesian Liga 1 club Persik Kediri.

=== One Taguig ===
On 15 September 2024, Lyngbø left Indonesia to sign for Philippines Football League club One Taguig.

=== Nongbua Pitchaya ===
During the summer transfer window of 2025, Lyngbø joined Thai League 1 club Nongbua Pitchaya.

=== Kelantan TRW ===
In July 2025, Lyngbø joined newly promoted Malaysia Super League side Kelantan TRW on a free transfer. During the first leg of a Round of 16 Piala Malaysia match-up against Selangor, Lyngbø scored the first goal after receiving a pass from Syafik Ismail in a 1–2 loss.

=== Melaka FC ===
In February 2026, during the second transfer window of the 2025–26 season, Lyngbø joined Malaysian club Melaka on a permanent basis in preparation for their first-leg quarter-final match-up against Johor in the Piala Malaysia.

== International career ==
Born in Norway to a Norwegian father and a Filipino mother, Lyngbø is eligible to represent Norway or the Philippines at international level.

=== Philippines ===
In 2019, Lyngbø received his first call up for the Philippines national team in a training camp in Bangkok, Thailand.

In December 2022, he made his debut for the Philippines in a 1–0 friendly defeat against Vietnam.
