= Ahmed Shamsaldin =

Egyptian footballer (born 1993)

Personal information
- Full name: Ahmed Ayman Shamsaldin Abdalazem
- Date of birth: 2 August 1993 (age 33)
- Place of birth: Cairo, Egypt
- Height: 1.96 m (6 ft 5 in)
- Position: Forward

Team information
- Current team: Melaka
- Number: 99

Youth career
- Zamalek SC
- ENPPI SC
- Istanbul FC

Senior career*
Years	Team	Apps	(Gls)
2016	El Entag El Harby SC		
2016–2018	Telephonat Beni Suef SC		
2018	TSV Stellingen 88		
2019	Phitsanulok		
2019–2020	Rajpracha		
2020–2021	Nonthaburi United		
2021	Newroz SC		
2022	Muktijoddha Sangsad KC		
2022	Al-Salt SC		
2023	Asswehly SC		
2023–2024	Jableh SC		
2024	Al-Salt SC		
2025	Nakhon Pathom United		
2025	KS Kastrioti		
2026–	Melaka		
- * Club domestic league appearances and goals

Ahmed Shamsaldin (born 2 August 1993) is an Egyptian professional footballer who currently plays as a forward for the Malaysia Super League club Melaka.

== Club career ==
Ahmed learned to play football at the Egyptian clubs Zamalek SC, ENPPI SC and Istanbul FC. Until June 2018, he played for El-Entag El-Harby SC and Telephonat Beni Suef SC. In mid-June 2018, he moved to Germany and played for the lower-league Hamburg club TSV Stellingen 88.

In January 2019, he moved to Thailand. He joined Phitsanulok, a fourth-division club and playing in the Thai League 4. After the first half of the season, he moved to the Thai League 3 club Rajpracha in June 2019. In July 2020 he moved to the Bangkok Metropolitan Region to Nonthaburi United.

In early 2022, he moved to Bangladesh and signed a contract with Bangladesh Premier League club Muktijoddha Sangsad KC. He made eight Premier League appearances for the Dhaka-based club. In the same year, he moved to Jordan, where he played for Al-Salt SC. In January 2023, he was signed by Asswehly SC from Libya. He was under contract here until September 2023 and stints at Jableh SC.

He returned to Thailand in January 2025. Here, he was signed by the Thai League 1 club Nakhon Pathom United. At the end of the 2024/25 Thai League season, he and Nakhon Pathom finished second-to-last in the standings and were relegated to the second division. After relegation, his contract was not renewed in the summer of 2025, Ahmed moved to Albania. He joined the second tier Kategoria e Parë club KS Kastrioti.

For the 2026 season, Ahmed began a new journey by signing a contract with Melaka.
