= Hang Jebat Stadium =

Multi-purpose stadium in Paya Rumput, Malacca, Malaysia

Coordinates: 2°17′21″N 102°13′59″E

Hang Jebat Stadium Stadium Hang Jebat ستاديوم هڠ جبت
- Hang Jebat Stadium
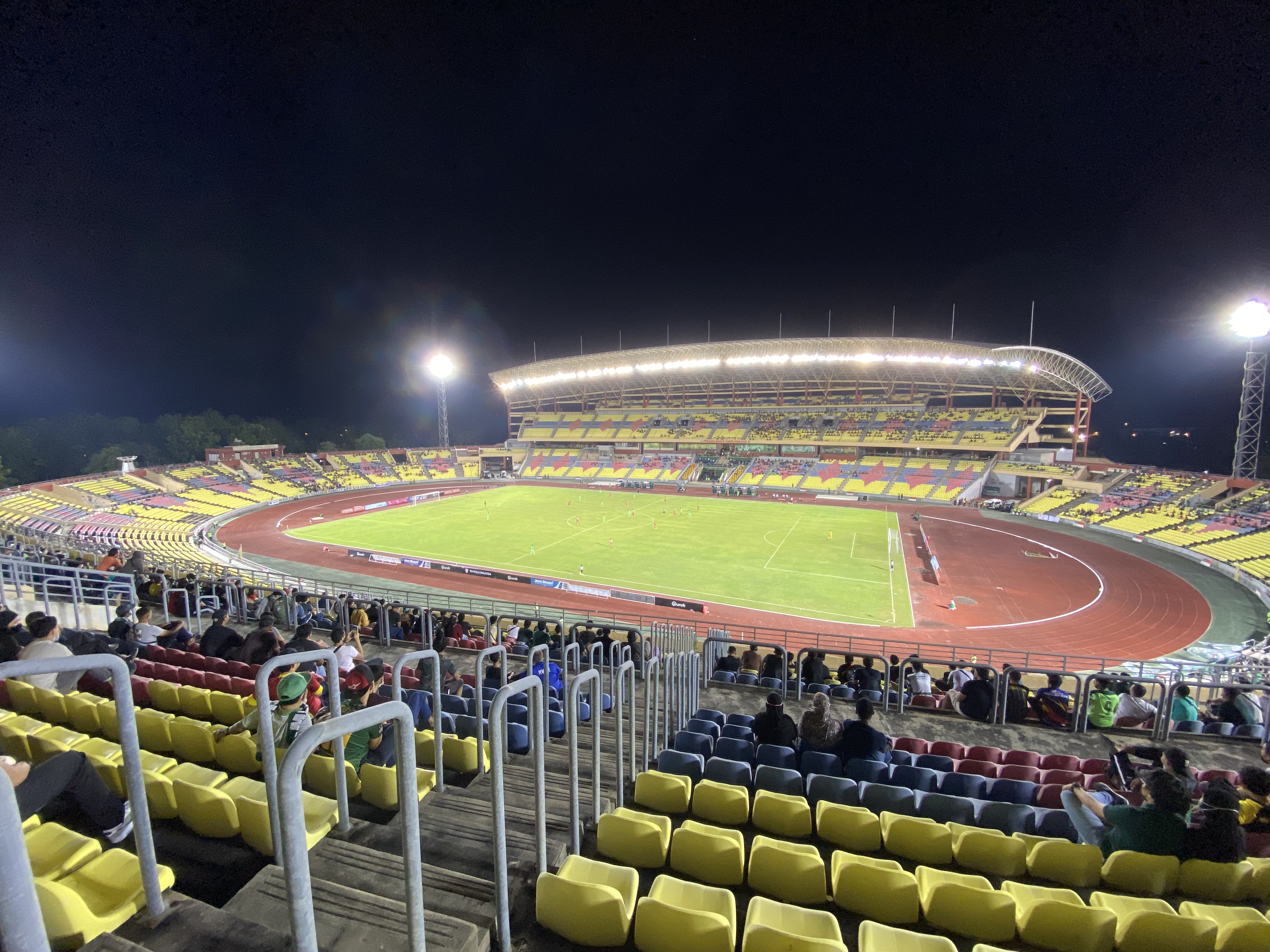
- Hang Jebat Stadium during the 2021 Malaysia Cup
- Interactive map of Hang Jebat Stadium; Stadium Hang Jebat ستاديوم هڠ جبت
- Location: Paya Rumput, Malacca, Malaysia
- Owner: Perbadanan Stadium Melaka (Malacca Stadium Corporation)
- Capacity: 40,000
- Surface: Grass pitch Track

Construction
- Opened: September 2004

Tenants
- TM F.C. Melaka United (2005–2022); Melaka (2022–); SAMB (2024–)

The Hang Jebat Stadium (Malay: Stadium Hang Jebat) is a multi-purpose stadium with a capacity of 40,000 people in Paya Rumput (near Krubong), Malacca, Malaysia. It was completed in September 2004 and named after a Malacca Sultanate Laksamana, Hang Jebat. The stadium was the home for Melaka United and is currently used mostly for football matches. In 2010, it became the main venue for the Sukma Games.

During the third round of the 2018 FIFA World Cup qualification, Syria national football team played many of its home matches there due to the Syrian Civil War.

== Gallery ==
Hang Jebat Stadium

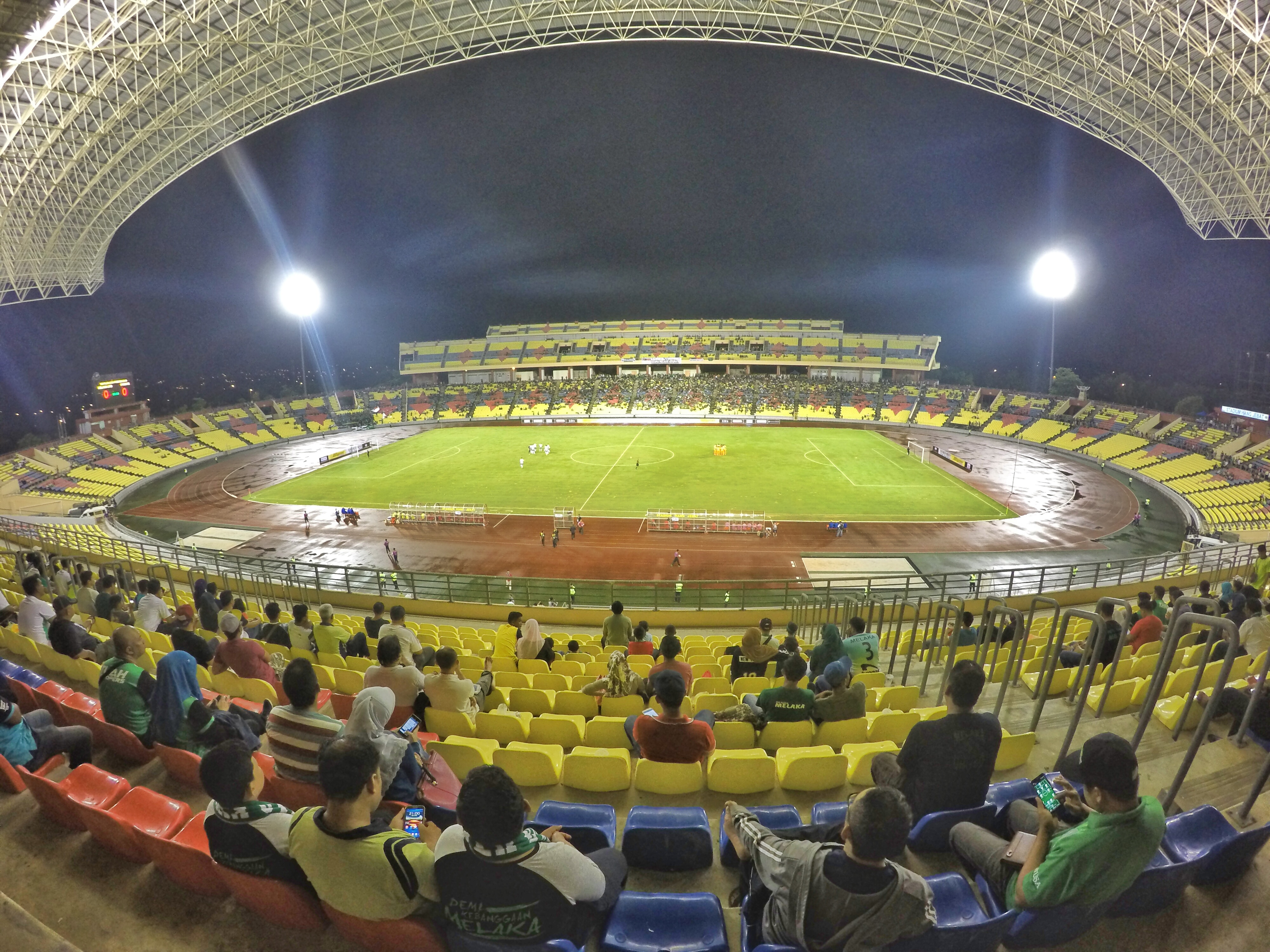
From grandstand.

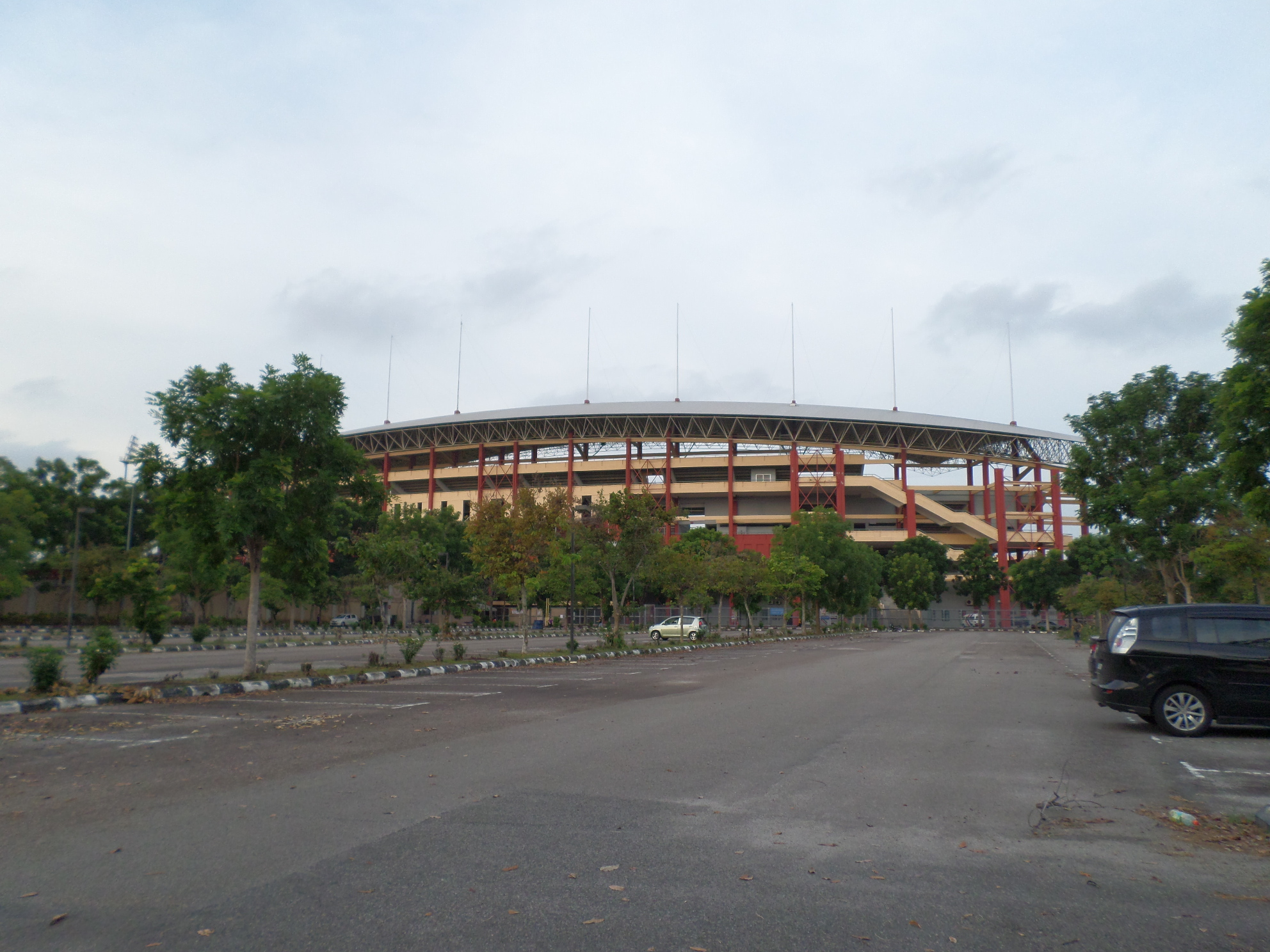
Hang Jebat Stadium from outside.

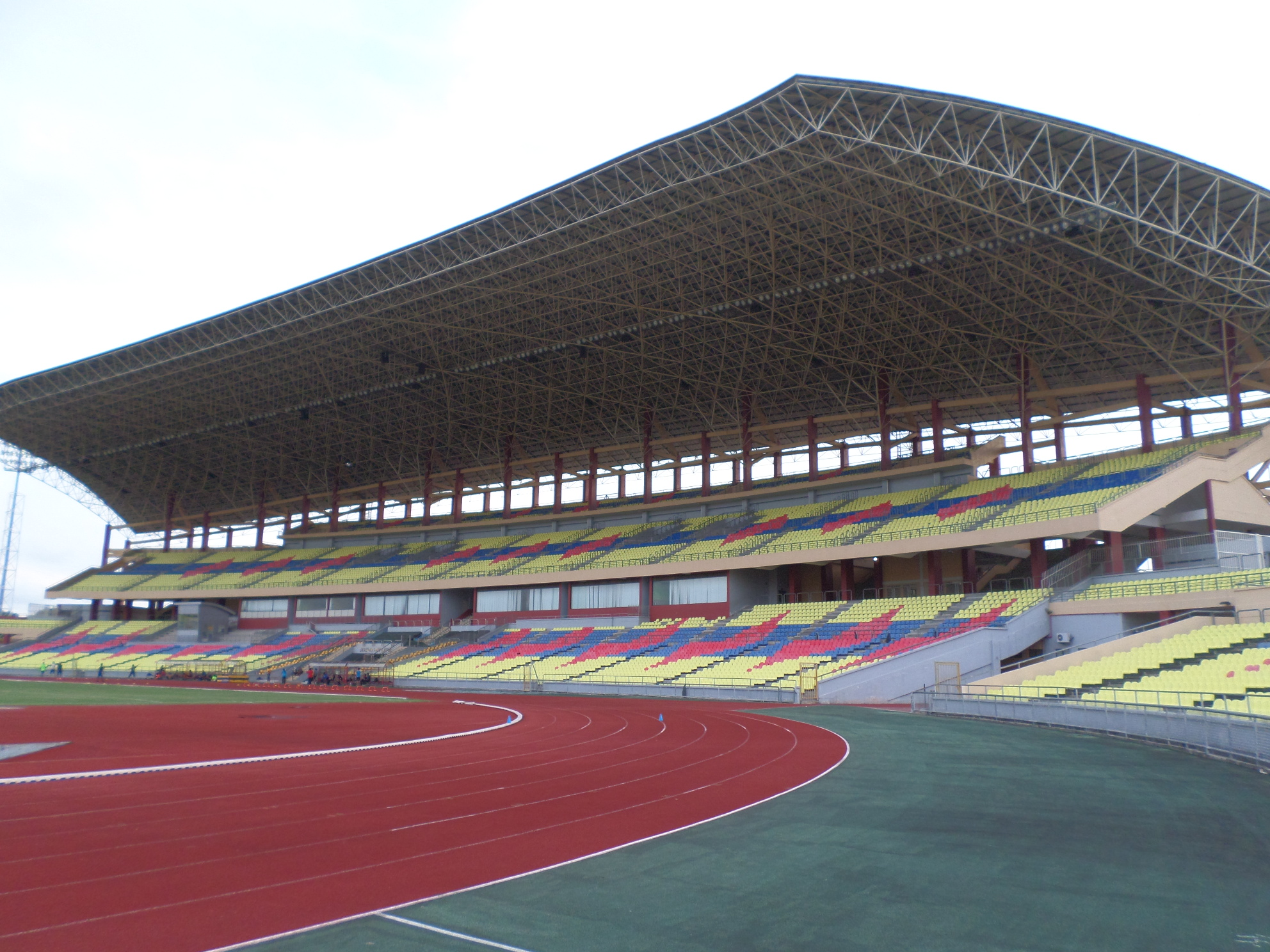
Grandstand from inside.

== International fixtures ==
Date	Competition	Team	Score	Team	Attendance
29 March 2016	Friendly	Malaysia	0–0	Macau	
6 September 2016	2018 FIFA World Cup qualification	Syria	0–0	South Korea	
23 March 2017	2018 FIFA World Cup qualification	Syria	1–0	Uzbekistan	
13 June 2017	2018 FIFA World Cup qualification	Syria	2–2	China	
22 August 2017	Friendly	Malaysia	1–2	Syria	
31 August 2017	2018 FIFA World Cup qualification	Syria	3–1	Qatar	
5 September 2017	2018 FIFA World Cup qualification	Malaysia	1–1	Hong Kong	3,646
10 October 2017	2018 FIFA World Cup qualification	Syria	1–1	Australia	2,150
16 October 2018	Friendly	Malaysia	0–1	Kyrgyzstan	6,196
13 October 2025	Friendly	Uzbekistan	1–2	Uruguay	16,666

== See also ==
- Sport in Malaysia
- Hang Tuah Stadium
- List of football stadiums in Malaysia
