= Krubong =

Town in Malacca, Malaysia

- Suburb
- Interactive map of Krubong
- Coordinates: 2°17′10″N 102°15′3″E
- Country: Malaysia
- State: Malacca
- City: Malacca City
- District: Melaka Tengah

Area
  - Total: 14.5 km^{2} (5.6 sq mi)

Population
  - Total: 31,936
  - Density: 2,200/km^{2} (5,700/sq mi)
- Postal code: 75450

Krubong is a mukim and town in Melaka Tengah District, Malacca, Malaysia. It has few residential areas and villages (kampongs) including: Taman Krubong Utama, Taman Krubong Pertama, Kampung Lanjut Manis, Kampung Tanah Merah, Taman Krubong Permai, Krubong Residence, Kampung Sungai Badau, Taman Krubong Jaya, Kampung Krubong, Taman Krubong Indah, Kampung Tampoi and Taman Seri Krubong as well as a name sake Light Industrial Park.

As with neighbouring Paya Rumput, the town is famous due to its close proximity to Hang Jebat Stadium, which serves as the main sports hub of Malacca State.

== Economy ==
- Krubong Light Industrial Park

== Education ==
Kindergarten

- Malacca Islamic Religious Department Al Ansar Kindergarten

Primary School

- Krubong National Primary School
- Kampung Krubong Religious Primary School

Secondary School

- Krubong National Secondary School

== Religious sites ==
- An-Nur Mosque
- Church of Our Lady of Guadalupe (Catholic Church)
