= Melaka F.C. =

Malaysian football club

Melaka
- Full name: Melaka Football Club
- Short name: MLK
- Founded: 2022; 4 years ago
- Ground: Hang Jebat Stadium; Hang Tuah Stadium
- Capacity: 40,000; 1,000
- President: Datuk Wira Nur Azmi Ahmad
- Head coach: E. Elavarasan
- League: Malaysia Super League
- 2025–26: MSL, 11th of 13
- Website: Melaka FC
Home colours	Away colours

Melaka Football Club (Malay: Kelab Bolasepak Melaka), simply known as Melaka, is a Malaysian professional football club based in Malacca City, Malacca. The club plays in the top tier of the Malaysian football league system, the Malaysia Super League, after promotion from the Malaysia A1 Semi-Pro League 2024–25.

== History ==
Following the dissolution of Melaka United, Melaka Football Club was founded as a continuation of the previous club, though they did not inherit the honours and titles won by Melaka United. Melaka participated in the 2023 Malaysia M3 League in their debut season.

=== Promotion to the top flight ===
The club competed in the 2024–25 Malaysia Cup for the first time in their history. They faced Malaysia Super League club Terengganu but ultimately fell to a 4–1 aggregate defeat. Melaka secured title of the A1 League in 2024–25 and promotion to the Malaysia Super League.

== Team image ==
=== Crests and colours ===
2022

2023

2024–25

Melaka FC changed their crest before joining the 2023 Malaysia M3 League, and again in the 2024–25 Malaysia A1 Semi-Pro League.

== Stadium ==
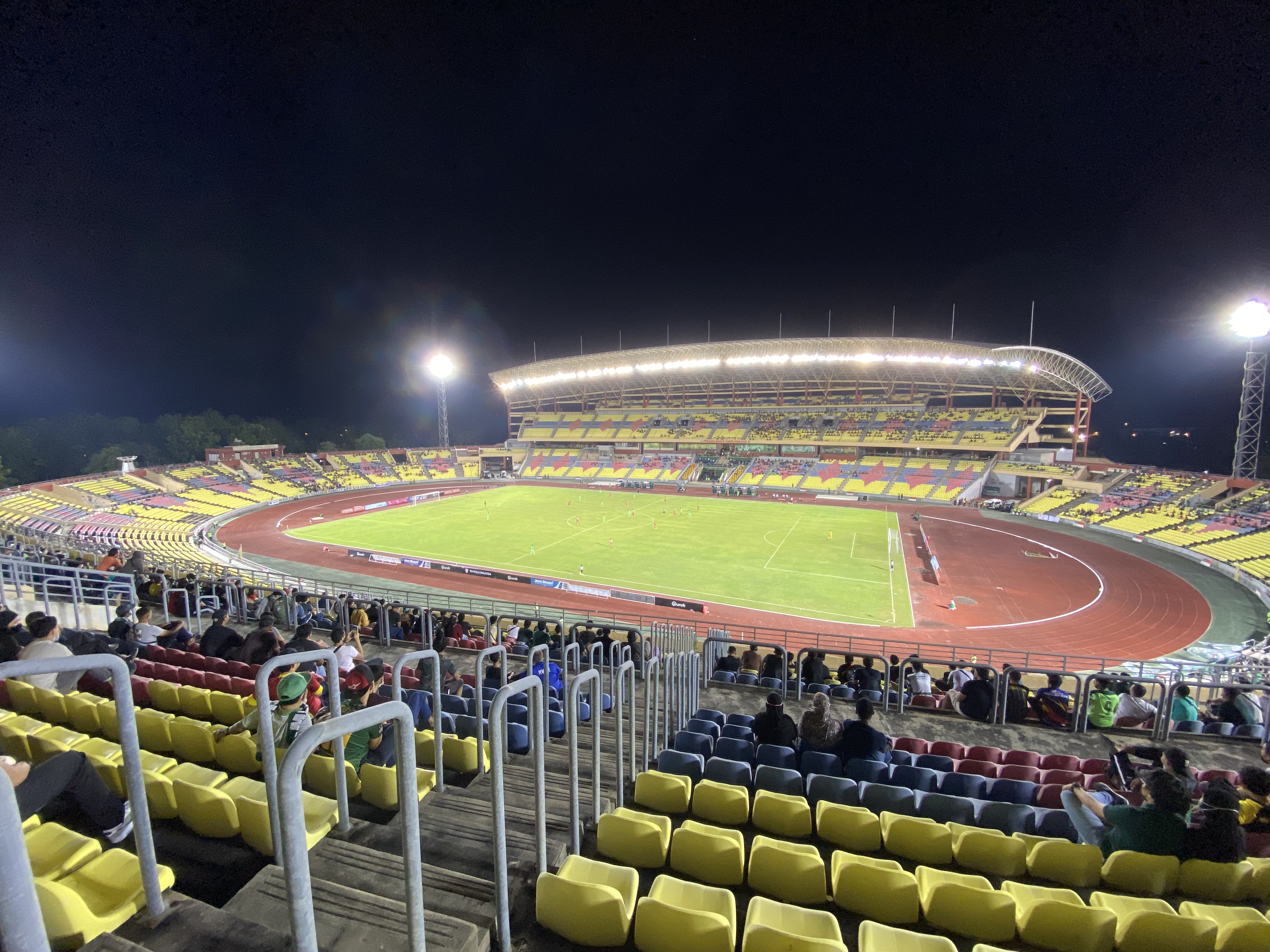
Hang Jebat Stadium

Melaka plays at the Hang Jebat Stadium. The capacity of the stadium is 40,000. The club has previously been using the Hang Tuah Stadium as their home ground in 2023. It was still used as a training ground and home venue for Melaka FA development and youth squad, which has mostly competed in the Piala Presiden and the Piala Belia.

== Academy development ==
The development structure of Melaka's reserve and youth teams has evolved through several phases. Melaka Football Club Under-20 is the under-20 reserve and youth development football team of Malaysian professional club for senior team, based in Malacca City, Malacca, the team serves as the primary developmental bridge between state-level grassroots football and the senior squad competing in the Malaysia Super League.

In the 2026–27 season, the squad made its debut in the third tier of the Malaysian football league system alongside competing in the national Malaysia A2 Amateur League competition.

== Kit manufacturers and shirt sponsors ==
Season	Kit manufacturer	Main sponsors (chest)	Shirt sponsors (shoulder)	Shirt sponsors (sleeve)	Shirt sponsors (back)
2023	(Germany) Puma	MBSB Bank	Extra Joss	None	Activesports
2024	(Germany) Puma	Zahara, MBSB Bank, Malacca City Council	Extra Joss	HLRB Processing Sdn Bhd	Activesports
2025	(Thailand) FBT	Xperts.my, Kemalak Group	Enca Group, Royan Trading, Modulasi Jasa, Lindo Wellness	Aman Adjusters, Profaz Maju Niaga,	DCS, Qalb Zahara
2026	(Germany) Puma	Kemalak Group, Xperts.my	Conextone	T & Y, W Petroleum	ABCS, Qalb Zahara; Activesports

== Players ==
As of 8 Sep 2026

Note: Flags indicate national team as defined under FIFA eligibility rules; some limited exceptions apply. Players may hold more than one non-FIFA nationality.

No.	Pos.	Nation	Player
2	DF	MAS	Che Rashid
3	DF	PHI	Simen Lyngbø
4	DF	MAS	Aroon Kumar
5	DF	KOR	Kim Shin-hoo
6	MF	MAS	Zahril Azri
7	MF	KOR	Park Kwang-il
8	MF	KOR	Do Dong-hyun
9	FW	LBR	Kpah Sherman
10	FW	MYA	Hein Htet Aung
11	FW	MAS	Jafri Firdaus Chew
13	FW	CAM	Abdel Kader
15	MF	MAS	Hasbullah Abu Bakar
16	MF	NGR	Michael Ozor
19	GK	MAS	Khairul Fahmi Che Mat (captain)
20	MF	BIH	Dino Kalesic
21	DF	MAS	Kamal Arif

No.	Pos.	Nation	Player
22	MF	MAS	Syahir Rashid
23	DF	MAS	Azwan Aripin
24	DF	MNE	Argzim Redžović
25	DF	MAS	Khairul Anwar Shahrudin
26	GK	MAS	Hafiz Azizi
29	GK	MAS	Firdaus Irman
30	FW	BRA	Christian
33	DF	CIV	Noel Agbre
39	DF	MAS	S. Thaanush
51	MF	JPN	Shuto Asano
66	MF	IRI	Ali Nouri Zangir
68	MF	MAS	V. Ruventhiran
80	MF	MAS	Nizaruddin Jazi
89	DF	MAS	Mahalli Jasuli
98	FW	FRA	Ronny Song
99	FW	MAS	Alif Ikmalrizal

=== Out on loan ===
Note: Flags indicate national team as defined under FIFA eligibility rules; some limited exceptions apply. Players may hold more than one non-FIFA nationality.

No.	Pos.	Nation	Player
12	FW	MAS	Azim Rahim (at UM-Damansara United until 30 June 2027)

== Management and staff ==
As of August 2026

Position	Name
President	(Malaysia) Datuk Wira Nur Azmi Ahmad
Team manager	(Malaysia) Muhammad Najmi Nordin
Head coach	(Malaysia) E. Elavarasan
Assistant coach	(Bosnia and Herzegovina) Muamer Salibašić
Goalkeeper coach	(Malaysia) Mazlan Wahid
Physio	(Malaysia) Fakhrusy Syakirin Yaacob
Team official	(Malaysia) Zulkarnain Osman
Team coordinator	(Malaysia) Al Qayyum Azlan Farhan
Team media	(Malaysia) Iz'aan Firdaus Chin
Masseur	(Malaysia) Muhammad Afif Mohd Derus
Kitman	(Malaysia) Ahmad Shukri Othman

== Managerial history ==
Coach	Years	Honours
(Portugal) Pedro Hipólito	2023	—N/a
(Malaysia) K. Devan	2024	(gold) 2024–25 A1 Semi-Pro League winner
(Malaysia) E. Elavarasan	2026	—N/a

== Notable players ==
As of 2026–27 season.

=== International capped players ===
AFC/OFC.: (Cambodia) Abdel Kader Coulibaly; (Myanmar) Hein Htet Aung; (Philippines) Charles Dabao; (Philippines) Jun Badelic; (Philippines) Justin Baas; (Philippines) Simen Lyngbø; (South Korea) Do Dong-hyun; (South Korea) Park Kwang-il	CAF.: (Liberia) Kpah Sherman	UEFA.: (Montenegro) Argzim Redžović	CONMEBOL/ CONCACAF.: –NIL–

=== Foreign players per season ===
Team	Player 1	Player 2	Player 3	Player 4	Player 5	Player 6	Player 7	Player 8	Player 9	Player 10	Player 11	Player 12	Player 13	Player 14	Player 15	Former players
2024–25	(Nigeria) Michael Onyekachi Ozor	(Ghana) Fuseini Issah	(Nigeria) Oumar Bangoura	(France) Rodrigue Nanitelamio	—N/a	—N/a	—N/a	—N/a	—N/a	—N/a	—N/a	—N/a	—N/a	—N/a	—N/a	—N/a
2025–26	(Nigeria) Michael Onyekachi Ozor	(Brazil) Juan Douglas	(South Korea) Dae-yeob Gu	(Montenegro) Argzim Redžović	(South Korea) Do Dong-hyun	(South Korea) Park Kwang-il	(Ivory Coast) Noel Agbre	(Bosnia and Herzegovina) Dino Kalesic	(Philippines) Simen Lyngbø	(Egypt) Ahmed Shamsaldin	(Philippines) Justin Baas	—N/a	—N/a	—N/a	—N/a	(Philippines) Charles Dabao (Philippines) Jun Badelic (Ghana) Bernard Arthur (Brazil) Anderson Brito (Brazil) Patrick Gama (Brazil) Danilo Magalhães (Brazil) Vitor Carvalho
2026–27	(Nigeria) Michael Onyekachi Ozor	(Brazil) Christian de Souza André	(South Korea) Shin-hoo Kim	(Montenegro) Argzim Redžović	(South Korea) Do Dong-hyun	(South Korea) Park Kwang-il	(Ivory Coast) Noel Agbre	(Bosnia and Herzegovina) Dino Kalesic	(Philippines) Simen Lyngbø	(Cambodia) Abdel Kader Coulibaly	(Myanmar) Hein Htet Aung	(Japan) Shuto Asano	(Iran) Ali Nouri Zangir	(Liberia) Kpah Sherman	(France) Ronny Song	

== Season by season record ==
Season	League									FA Cup	M Cup	C Cup	Top goalscorer (all competitions)	
Season	Division	P	W	D	L	F	A	Pts	Pos	FA Cup	M Cup	C Cup	Name	Goals
2023	M3 League	24	8	7	9	38	38	31	10th	Rd 2	DNQ	DNQ	(Malaysia) Muhammad Fakrul Aiman	8
2024–25	A1 Semi-Pro League	28	22	5	1	81	13	71	1st	Opted out	Rd of 16	QF	(Malaysia) Azim Rahim	22
2025–26	Super League	24	4	7	13	18	45	19	11th	Rd of 16	QF	DNQ	(Brazil) Juan Douglas (Egypt) Ahmed Shamsaldin (Bosnia and Herzegovina) Dino Kalesic	4
2026–27	Super League	0	0	0	0	0	0	0	TBD	Rd of 16	TBD	TBD	TBD	0

Champions	Runners-up	Promoted	Relegated

== Honours ==
=== Domestic competitions ===
==== League ====
- Division 3/M3 League/A1 League
  - Champions (1): 2024–25
