= 2025–26 Johor Darul Ta'zim F.C. season =

Johor Darul Ta'zim
2025–26 season
- Chairman: Tunku Tun Aminah Sultan Ibrahim
- Head Coach: Xisco Munoz
- Stadium: Sultan Ibrahim Stadium
- Super League: 1st
- FA Cup: Winners
- Malaysia Cup: Winners
- Charity Shield: Winners
- Champions League Elite: Quarter-finals
- ASEAN Club Championship: Semi-finals
- Top goalscorer: League: Bérgson (27); All: Bérgson (42)
- Biggest win: 14–1 vs Kelantan The Real Warrios (A), 10 May 2026, Super League
- Biggest defeat: 1–3 vs Buriram United (H), 13 May 2026, ASEAN Club Championship
Home colours	Away colours	Third colours

The 2025–26 season is Johor Darul Ta'zim Football Club's 52nd season in club history and 11th season in the Malaysia Super League after rebranding their name from Johor FC. The club will also participate in the inaugural 2025–26 AFC Champions League Elite.

== Season overview ==

Johor Darul Ta'zim's usual starting lineup in the Champions League

The 2025/26 season was a historic one for Johor Darul Ta'zim, as the club won its 12th consecutive Malaysia Super League title and completed a domestic sweep by also lifting the FA Cup, Malaysia Cup, and Charity Shield—becoming the first club in Malaysian football history to win all major domestic trophies in four consecutive seasons.

=== Super League ===
JDT began their Malaysia Super League campaign with a 3–0 win over Selangor, with Jairo opening the scoring. Under head coach Xisco Muñoz, who had taken charge at the start of the previous season, the team transformed from defending champions into an unstoppable title-winning side. JDT secured the league title on 16 March 2026 with a 3–0 away win over DPMM at the Hassanal Bolkiah National Stadium, clinching the club’s 12th consecutive top-flight championship. They finished top of the table with 70 points from 24 matches, recording 23 wins, 1 draw, and 0 defeats, with a goal difference of +107, finishing ahead of second-placed Kuching City.

=== FA Cup ===
In the 2025 Malaysia FA Cup, JDT entered the round of 16 as three-time defending champions. They were drawn against UM-Damansara United, winning the first leg 5–0 away before completing the tie with a 5–3 home victory to progress 10–3 on aggregate. In the quarter-finals, JDT beat Penang 2–1 away at City Stadium in George Town on 17 October, with goals from Óscar Arribas and Ager Aketxe; they completed the tie with a 3–0 home win at Sultan Ibrahim Stadium, advancing 5–1 on aggregate. In the semi-finals, JDT defeated Kuching City 2–1 away in Kuching on 9 November, with Bérgson scoring both goals, before winning the return leg 2–0 at home to progress 4–1 on aggregate. JDT then defeated Sabah 5–0 in the final at Bukit Jalil National Stadium on 14 December 2025, with goals from Jonathan Silva, an own goal by Rawilson Batuil, Jairo, Óscar Arribas, and Manuel Hidalgo, to win their fifth FA Cup title and fourth consecutively.

=== Malaysia Cup ===
The 2026 Malaysia Cup was where JDT completed their domestic trophy sweep for the 2025/26 season. As defending champions, they began in the round of 16 against PDRM, thrashing them 10–1 away in the first leg, with Teto scoring a double hat-trick, before winning the return leg 1–0 at home to progress 11–1 on aggregate. In the quarter-finals, JDT defeated Melaka 5–0 at home and 3–1 away to advance 8–1 on aggregate. They then beat Kuala Lumpur City 4–0 away and 4–1 at home in the semi-finals, progressing 8–1 on aggregate to reach the final. In the final against Kuching City on 23 May 2026 at Bukit Jalil National Stadium, JDT won 2–0 with late goals from Marcos Guilherme and substitute Arif Aiman, securing their sixth Malaysia Cup title and a record fourth consecutive triumph. The victory completed JDT's sweep of the Charity Shield, FA Cup, Super League, and Malaysia Cup in the same season.

=== Champions League ===
In the 2025–26 AFC Champions League Elite, Johor Darul Ta'zim (JDT) reached the quarter-finals for the first time in the club's history since first entering Asia's premier club competition in 1996. In the league stage, JDT were drawn against seven opponents: Shanghai Port, Shanghai Shenhua, Vissel Kobe, Machida Zelvia, Buriram United, Melbourne City, Sanfrecce Hiroshima, and Chengdu Rongcheng. They hosted Shanghai Port, Shanghai Shenhua, Vissel Kobe, and Machida Zelvia at Sultan Ibrahim Stadium, while travelling to face Buriram United, Melbourne City, Sanfrecce Hiroshima, and Chengdu Rongcheng away. JDT finished sixth in the East Zone with 11 points from three wins, two draws, and three defeats, advancing to the round of 16, where they were drawn against Japanese side Sanfrecce Hiroshima. In the first leg at home on 4 March 2026, JDT won 3–1, with goals from Ager Aketxe, Bérgson, and Marcos Guilherme, before an own goal by Nenê gave Hiroshima a consolation. In the return leg at Edion Peace Wing Hiroshima on 11 March, Kosuke Kinoshita converted a 90th-minute penalty to give Hiroshima a 1–0 win on the night, but JDT held on to progress 3–2 on aggregate. The achievement made JDT the first Malaysian club to reach the quarter-finals of the competition since its rebranding, and their first continental quarter-final since their debut in the Asian Club Championship in 1996. Their run ultimately ended in the quarter-finals against Saudi side Al-Ahli, who won 2–1 in Jeddah on 17 April 2026.

=== ASEAN Club Championship ===
In the 2025–26 ASEAN Club Championship (Shopee Cup), Johor Darul Ta'zim (JDT) made their debut appearance in the competition and reached the semi-finals. Drawn into Group B, they faced Thép Xanh Nam Định, PKR Svay Rieng, True Bangkok United, Lion City Sailors, and Shan United in a single round-robin format. JDT opened with a 3–1 home win over Lion City Sailors, before defeating True Bangkok United 4–0 at home, with Bérgson scoring a hat-trick. A 2–2 draw away to PKR Svay Rieng was followed by a 3–0 home win over Shan United, before JDT drew 1–1 away to Thép Xanh Nam Định in their final group match to finish second in Group B with 11 points, qualifying for the semi-finals. There, they faced defending champions Buriram United, losing the first leg 1–3 at home before winning the return leg 2–1 after extra time in Buriram, but were eliminated 3–4 on aggregate.

== Squad ==
=== Johor Darul Ta'zim ===
As of 15 January 2026

Squad No.	Name	Nationality	Date of birth (age)	Previous club	Contract since	Contract end
Goalkeepers
1	Christian Abad Amat	(Malaysia) (Spain)	5 August 2006 (age 20)	(Spain) Elche	2024	2026
16	Syihan Hazmi	(Malaysia)	26 February 1996 (age 30)	(Malaysia) Negeri Sembilan	2023	2026
58	Andoni Zubiaurre	(Spain)	4 December 1996 (age 29)	(Spain) Eldense	2024	2026
43	Zulhilmi Sharani	(Malaysia)	4 May 2004 (age 22)	(Malaysia) Youth systems	2019	2026
Defenders
2	Matthew Davies	(Malaysia) (Australia)	7 February 1995 (age 31)	(Malaysia) Pahang	2020	2026
3	Shahrul Saad	(Malaysia)	8 July 1993 (age 33)	(Malaysia) Perak	2021	2026
5	Antonio Glauder	(Spain) (Philippines)	18 October 1995 (age 31)	(Spain) Cádiz	2025	2026
13	Park Jun-heong	(South Korea)	25 January 1993 (age 33)	(Thailand) Ratchaburi	2024	2026
14	Shane Lowry (Note: Lowry registered for ACL Elite only)	(Australia) (Republic of Ireland)	12 June 1989 (age 37)	(Qatar) Al Ahli	2021	2026
15	Feroz Baharudin	(Malaysia)	2 April 2000 (age 26)	(Malaysia) Youth systems	2021	2026
17	Jon Irazabal (Note: João Figueiredo, Jon Irazabal, and Hector Hevel were suspended by FIFA from all football activities on 26 September over alleged falsified documents regarding their eligibility for Malaysian sporting nationality. This was temporarily lifted on 27 Jan till the CAS judgement. See: Malaysian football naturalisation scandal)	(Spain)	28 November 1996 (age 29)	(Azerbaijan) Sabah FK	2025	2026
22	La'Vere Corbin-Ong	(Malaysia) (Canada)	21 April 1991 (age 35)	(Netherlands) Go Ahead Eagles	2018	2026
33	Jonathan Silva	(Argentina) (Italy)	29 June 1994 (age 32)	(Cyprus) Pafos	2025	2026
36	Raúl Parra	(Spain)	26 November 1999 (age 26)	(Spain) Eldense	2025	2026
44	Miquel Cuesta	(Spain)	26 February 2006 (age 20)	(Spain) RCD Mallorca U19	2025	2026
50	Junior Eldstål	(Malaysia) (England) (Sweden)	16 September 1991 (age 35)	(Indonesia) Dewa United	2022	2026
91	Syahmi Safari	(Malaysia)	5 February 1998 (age 28)	(Malaysia) Selangor	2022	2026
Midfielders
4	Afiq Fazail	(Malaysia)	29 September 1994 (age 32)	(Malaysia) Harimau Muda B	2015	2026
6	Hong Wan	(Malaysia) (England)	17 August 2000 (age 26)	(England) Wolverhampton Wanderers U23	2021	2026
7	Enzo Lombardo	(France) (Philippines)	16 April 1997 (age 29)	(Spain) Huesca	2024	2026
8	Hector Hevel	(Malaysia) (Netherlands)	15 May 1996 (age 30)	(Portugal) Portimonense	2025	2026
12	Stuart Wilkin	(Malaysia) (England)	12 March 1998 (age 28)	(Malaysia) Sabah	2026	2026
18	Nené	(Portugal)	10 June 1995 (age 31)	(China) Yunnan Yukun	2026	
20	Teto	(Spain) (Philippines)	13 September 2001 (age 25)	(Spain) Tenerife	2025	
21	Nazmi Faiz	(Malaysia)	16 August 1994 (age 32)	(Malaysia) Youth systems	2017	2026
23	Eddy Israfilov	(Azerbaijan) (Spain)	2 August 1992 (age 34)	(Azerbaijan) Neftçi PFK	2024	2026
26	Mohamadou Sumareh	(Malaysia) (The Gambia)	20 September 1994 (age 32)	(Thailand) Police Tero	2021	2026
27	Ibrahim Manusi	(Malaysia)	30 September 2001 (age 25)	(Malaysia) Pahang	2025	2026
28	Nacho Méndez	(Malaysia) (Spain) (Cuba)	30 March 1998 (age 28)	(Spain) Sporting Gijón	2025	
30	Natxo Insa	(Malaysia) (Spain)	9 June 1986 (age 40)	(Spain) Levante	2017	2026
41	Syamer Kutty Abba	(Malaysia)	1 October 1997 (age 29)	(Malaysia) Kuala Lumpur City	2018	2026
47	Ager Aketxe	(Spain)	30 December 1993 (age 32)	(Spain) Zaragoza	2025	2026
81	Daryl Sham	(Malaysia) (Philippines)	30 November 2002 (age 23)	(Malaysia) Youth systems	2021	2026
	Brad Tapp	(Australia)	16 January 2001 (age 25)	(Australia) Central Coast Mariners	2026	
Strikers
9	Bergson	(Malaysia) (Brazil)	9 February 1991 (age 35)	(Brazil) Fortaleza	2021	2026
11	Jairo	(Brazil)	6 May 1992 (age 34)	(Cyprus) Pafos	2025	2026
19	Romel Morales	(Malaysia) (Colombia)	23 August 1997 (age 29)	(Malaysia) Kuala Lumpur City	2024	2026
24	Óscar Arribas	(Philippines) (Spain)	20 October 1998 (age 28)	(Spain) Cartagena	2023	2026
25	João Figueiredo	(Malaysia) (Brazil)	27 May 1996 (age 30)	(Turkey) İstanbul Başakşehir	2025	2026
29	Ajdin Mujagić	(Bosnia and Herzegovina)	3 January 1998 (age 28)	(Malaysia) Sabah	2026	2026
37	Heberty	(Brazil)	29 August 1988 (age 38)	(Thailand) Bangkok United	2023	2026
42	Arif Aiman	(Malaysia)	4 May 2002 (age 24)	(Malaysia) Youth systems	2020	2026
70	Samu Castillejo	(Spain)	18 January 1995 (age 31)	(Spain) Valencia	2025	2026
77	Celso Bermejo	(Malaysia) (Spain)	9 January 2005 (age 21)	(Spain) Villarreal C	2025	2026
88	Manuel Hidalgo	(Argentina)	3 May 1999 (age 27)	(Malaysia) Kuala Lumpur City	2024	2026
95	Marcos Guilherme	(Brazil)	5 August 1995 (age 31)	(Japan) FC Tokyo	2026	
97	Yago	(Brazil)	26 May 1997 (age 29)	(South Korea) Anyang	2026	
On Loan
	Declan Lambert	(Malaysia) (England)	21 September 1998 (age 28)	(Malaysia) Kuala Lumpur City	2024	2026
	Ryan Lambert	(Malaysia) (England)	21 September 1998 (age 28)	(Malaysia) Kuala Lumpur City	2024	2026
	Haqimi Azim	(Malaysia)	6 January 2003 (age 23)	(Malaysia) Kuala Lumpur City	2025	2026
29	Safawi Rasid	(Malaysia)	5 March 1997 (age 29)	(Malaysia) Terengganu	2017	2026
39	Gabriel Nistelrooy	(Malaysia)	25 April 2000 (age 26)	(Malaysia) Youth systems	2020	2025
28	Syafiq Ahmad	(Malaysia)	28 June 1995 (age 31)	(Malaysia) Kedah Darul Aman	2018	2026
	Azam Azmi	(Malaysia)	12 February 2001 (age 25)	(Malaysia) Terengganu	2024	2026
16	Danial Amier	(Malaysia)	27 March 1997 (age 29)	(Malaysia) Kuching City	2021	2025
	Fergus Tierney	(Malaysia) (Scotland)	19 March 2003 (age 23)	(Thailand) Nakhon Pathom United	2020	
	Nicolao Dumitru	(Italy)	12 October 1991 (age 35)	(Indonesia) PSS Sleman	2024	2025
	Andri Syahputra	(Qatar)	29 June 1999 (age 27)	(Qatar) Al-Gharafa	2026	
Left during the season
18	Iker Undabarrena	(Spain)	18 May 1995 (age 31)	(Spain) Leganés	2024	2026
94	Moussa Sidibe	(Mali) (Spain)	21 November 1994 (age 31)	(Indonesia) Persis Solo	2022	

=== Johor Darul Ta'zim II ===
As of 1 January 2026

Squad no.	Name	Nationality	Date of birth (age)	Previous club	Contract since	Contract end
Goalkeepers
1	Nur Lokman Abdullah	(Malaysia)	4 January 2004 (age 22)	(Malaysia) Johor Darul Ta'zim III		2026
22	Zulhilmi Sharani	(Malaysia)	5 April 2004 (age 22)	(Malaysia) Johor Darul Ta'zim II	2019	2026
25	Hafiz Azizi	(Malaysia)	5 August 2001 (age 25)	(Malaysia) Johor Darul Ta'zim III	2019	2026
	Harith El Aqil	(Malaysia)		(Malaysia) Johor Darul Ta'zim III	2024	2025
	Harith Bisyar	(Malaysia)		(Malaysia) Johor Darul Ta'zim III	2021	
Defenders
2	Dinesh Vikneswaran	(Malaysia)	26 August 2003 (age 23)	(Malaysia)	2024	2026
4	Adam Daniel	(Malaysia)	14 October 2004 (age 22)	(Malaysia) Johor Darul Ta'zim III	2021	2026
5	Shafizah Arshad	(Malaysia)	5 August 2005 (age 21)	(Malaysia) Johor Darul Ta'zim III		2026
14	Irfan Zakwan	(Malaysia)	14 February 2004 (age 22)	(Malaysia) Johor Darul Ta'zim III		2026
15	Pavithran Gunalan	(Malaysia)	10 January 2005 (age 21)	(Malaysia) Johor Darul Ta'zim III		2026
21	Marwan Abdul Rahman	(Malaysia)	1 February 2003 (age 23)	(Malaysia) Johor Darul Ta'zim III	2021	2026
27	Fakrul Haikal	(Malaysia)	31 October 2004 (age 22)	(Malaysia) Johor Darul Ta'zim III	2020	2026
28	Adam Farhan	(Malaysia)	3 April 2004 (age 22)	(Malaysia) Johor Darul Ta'zim III	2020	2026
29	Syukur Fariz	(Malaysia)	5 January 2003 (age 23)	(Malaysia) Johor Darul Ta'zim III	2021	2026
30	Danish Hakimi	(Malaysia)	6 January 2005 (age 21)	(Malaysia) Johor Darul Ta'zim III	2021	2026
31	Faris Danish	(Malaysia)	4 July 2006 (age 20)	(Malaysia) Johor Darul Ta'zim III		2026
32	Alif Ahmad	(Malaysia)	28 February 2003 (age 23)	(Malaysia) Johor Darul Ta'zim III	2024	2026
36	Ridwan Rosli	(Malaysia)	17 March 2005 (age 21)	(Malaysia) Johor Darul Ta'zim III		2026
40	Miquel Cuesta	(Spain)	26 February 2006 (age 20)	(Spain) RCD Mallorca U19 (S5)	2025	2026
	Haziq Ridhwan	(Malaysia)		(Malaysia) Johor Darul Ta'zim III	2024	2025
	Naqiu Aiman	(Malaysia)		(Malaysia) Johor Darul Ta'zim III	2020	2025
	Shazriman Hasnul	(Malaysia)		(Malaysia) Johor Darul Ta'zim III	2024	2025
Midfielders
6	Rafiefikri Rosman	(Malaysia)	13 June 2002 (age 24)	(Malaysia) Johor Darul Ta'zim III	2020	2026
7	Najmuddin Akmal	(Malaysia)	11 January 2003 (age 23)	(Malaysia) Johor Darul Ta'zim III	2022	2026
8	Danish Irham	(Malaysia)	16 November 2003 (age 23)	(Malaysia) Johor Darul Ta'zim III	2024	2026
10	Danish Syamer Tajiuddin	(Malaysia)	8 July 2004 (age 22)	(Malaysia) Negeri Sembilan II	2024	2026
12	Ziad El Basheer	(Malaysia)	24 December 2003 (age 22)	(Malaysia) Johor Darul Ta'zim III	2021	2026
13	Aysar Hadi	(Malaysia)	4 September 2003 (age 23)	(Malaysia) Johor Darul Ta'zim III	2021	2026
16	Irfan Shahkimi	(Malaysia)	19 January 2004 (age 22)	(Malaysia) Johor Darul Ta'zim III		2026
17	Alif Mutalib	(Malaysia)	16 January 2002 (age 24)	(Malaysia) Johor Darul Ta'zim III	2020	2026
18	Daryl Sham	(Malaysia)	30 November 2002 (age 23)	(Malaysia) Johor Darul Ta'zim III	2022	2026
19	Aznil Hafiz	(Malaysia)	7 June 2003 (age 23)	(Malaysia) Johor Darul Ta'zim III	2021	2026
20	Danish Zahir	(Malaysia)	20 June 2003 (age 23)	(Malaysia) Johor Darul Ta'zim III	2024	2026
23	Naim Zainudin	(Malaysia)	28 March 2005 (age 21)	(Malaysia) Johor Darul Ta'zim III		2026
24	Ariff Safwan	(Malaysia)	17 February 2005 (age 21)	(Malaysia) Johor Darul Ta'zim III		2026
55	Junior Eldstål	(Malaysia) (England) (Sweden)	16 September 1991 (age 35)	(Indonesia) Dewa United (I1)	2022	2026
60	Hong Wan	(Malaysia) (England)	17 August 2000 (age 26)	(England) Wolverhampton Wanderers U23	2021	2026
72	Ibrahim Manusi	(Malaysia)	30 September 2001 (age 25)	(Malaysia) Pahang	2025	2026
76	Jean Franco Casquete	(Colombia)	14 May 2004 (age 22)	(United Arab Emirates) Fursan Hispania		2026
77	Enzo Lombardo	(France) (Philippines)	16 April 1997 (age 29)	(Spain) SD Huesca (S2)	2024	2026
	Raziq Rahman	(Malaysia)		(Malaysia) Johor Darul Ta'zim III		2026
	Harif Mustaqim Hamdan	(Malaysia)		(Malaysia) Johor Darul Ta'zim III	2021	
Forwards
9	Abdul Raziq Rahman	(Malaysia)	28 January 2004 (age 22)	(Malaysia) Johor Darul Ta'zim III		2026
11	Danie Asyraf	(Malaysia)	8 July 2002 (age 24)	(Malaysia) Johor Darul Ta'zim III	2021	2026
62	Mohamadou Sumareh	(Malaysia) (The Gambia)	20 September 1994 (age 32)	(Thailand) Police Tero (T1)	2021	2026
99	Celso Bermejo	(Spain)	9 January 2005 (age 21)	(Spain) Villarreal CF C (S5)	2025	2026
Players who are loan to other clubs
1	Haziq Aiman	(Malaysia)	19 January 2005 (age 21)	(Malaysia) Johor Darul Ta'zim III	2024	2026
Players who had left other clubs during the season

=== Johor Darul Ta'zim III ===
As of 1 January 2026

Squad no.	Name	Nationality	Date of birth (age)	Previous club	Contract since	Contract end
Goalkeepers
1	Faez Iqhwan	(Malaysia)	3 February 2007 (age 19)	(Malaysia) Academy Mokhtar Dahari	2024	
24	Danial Idraqi	(Malaysia)	5 October 2006 (age 20)	(Malaysia) Johor Darul Ta'zim IV		
27	Nizhareef Irfan	(Malaysia)	21 March 2006 (age 20)	(Malaysia) Johor Darul Ta'zim IV		
51	Januwaar Gopal	(Malaysia)	15 February 2007 (age 19)	(Malaysia) Johor Darul Ta'zim IV		
Defenders
2	Afiq Hakimi	(Malaysia)	4 January 2007 (age 19)	(Malaysia) Academy Mokhtar Dahari	2024	
3	Raja Norfirdaus	(Malaysia)	28 January 2006 (age 20)	(Malaysia) Johor Darul Ta'zim IV		
4	Ariff Safwan	(Malaysia)	17 February 2005 (age 21)	(Malaysia) Johor Darul Ta'zim IV		2026
5	Faris Danish	(Malaysia)	4 July 2006 (age 20)	(Malaysia) Academy Mokhtar Dahari		2026
11	Qahir Dzakirin	(Malaysia)	19 March 2006 (age 20)	(Malaysia) Johor Darul Ta'zim IV		
15	Adib Ibrahim	(Malaysia)	16 August 2006 (age 20)	(Malaysia) Johor Darul Ta'zim IV		
21	Iyad Hadi Hakimi	(Malaysia)	15 January 2005 (age 21)	(Malaysia) Johor Darul Ta'zim IV		
23	Aqim Hazmi	(Malaysia)	9 June 2006 (age 20)	(Malaysia) Academy Mokhtar Dahari		
26	Danish Darus	(Malaysia)	19 March 2006 (age 20)	(Malaysia) Academy Mokhtar Dahari		
28	Haziq Hafiz	(Malaysia)	4 August 2006 (age 20)	(Malaysia) Johor Darul Ta'zim IV		
29	Azim Assyakrin	(Malaysia)	4 January 2007 (age 19)	(Malaysia) Johor Darul Ta'zim IV		
31	Ariff Rosidi	(Malaysia)	3 March 2005 (age 21)	(Malaysia) Johor Darul Ta'zim IV		
Midfielders
6	Aisy Al-Hakim	(Malaysia)	13 January 2007 (age 19)	(Malaysia) Johor Darul Ta'zim IV		
7	Muhammad Wafiq Saiby	(Malaysia)	1 April 2005 (age 21)	(Malaysia) Johor Darul Ta'zim IV		
8	Danish Pesenti	(Malaysia) (Italy)	9 January 2005 (age 21)	(Italy) Vado Ligure		
13	Don Damien Derwin	(Malaysia)	1 October 2006 (age 20)	(Malaysia) Johor Darul Ta'zim IV		
16	Ammar Shauqi	(Malaysia)	16 March 2006 (age 20)	(Malaysia) Johor Darul Ta'zim IV		
17	Hilmi Farish	(Malaysia)	3 July 2006 (age 20)	(Malaysia) Johor Darul Ta'zim IV		
18	Afiq Danish Zulkifli	(Malaysia)	14 February 2006 (age 20)	(Malaysia) Academy Mokhtar Dahari	2024	
19	Faiq Hakim	(Malaysia)	24 January 2005 (age 21)	(Malaysia) Johor Darul Ta'zim IV		
22	Arami Wafiy	(Malaysia)	30 March 2006 (age 20)	(Malaysia) Academy Mokhtar Dahari	2024	
25	Nur Irfan	(Malaysia)	14 April 2006 (age 20)	(Malaysia) Johor Darul Ta'zim IV		
34	Danish Hakimi	(Malaysia)	16 January 2005 (age 21)	(Malaysia) Johor Darul Ta'zim IV		
Strikers
9	Abid Safaraz	(Malaysia)	6 March 2007 (age 19)	(Malaysia) Johor Darul Ta'zim IV		
10	Muhammad Daniesh Amirruddin	(Malaysia)	3 August 2006 (age 20)	(Malaysia) Johor Darul Ta'zim IV		
12	Mohamad Zamir Zairi	(Malaysia)	6 October 2006 (age 20)	(Malaysia) Johor Darul Ta'zim IV		
14	Muhammad Naim Zainudin	(Malaysia)	28 March 2005 (age 21)	(Malaysia) Johor Darul Ta'zim IV		
20	Nor Ezawi	(Malaysia)	25 May 2005 (age 21)	(Malaysia) Johor Darul Ta'zim IV		
Players who had left other clubs on loan during the season

== Coaching staff ==
Position	Name
CEO	(Spain) Luis García
COO	(Australia) Alistair Edwards
Sporting Director	(Argentina) Martín Prest (Spain) Kiko Insa
Technical Director	(Australia) Alistair Edwards
Manager (JDT)	(Spain) Xisco Munoz
Manager (JDT II)	(Spain) Josep Ferré
Asst. Manager	(Argentina) Marcelo Baamonde
Asst. Manager	(Argentina) (Spain) Ramiro Gonzalez
Asst. Manager	(Malaysia) Hamzani Omar
Goalkeeper coach	(Spain)
Fitness coaches	(Spain) David Agustí
Physiotherapist	(Spain) Antonio Gavilán
Youth coach	(Greece) Dionysios Dokas
Video Analyst	(Spain) Adrián Sánchez

== Transfers ==
=== In ===
Preseason

Date	Position	Player	Transferred from	Ref
First team
31 May 2025	DF	(Malaysia) Azam Azmi	(Malaysia) Terengganu	Loan Return (Note: Azam Azmi moves back to Terengganu for another season of loan.)
31 May 2025	DF	(Malaysia) (England) Daniel Ting	(Malaysia) Sabah	Loan Return (Note: Daniel Ting moves back to Sabah for another season of loan.)
31 May 2025	DF	(Malaysia) (England) Declan Lambert	(Malaysia) Kuala Lumpur City	Loan Return
31 May 2025	MF	(Malaysia) (England) Ryan Lambert	(Malaysia) Kuala Lumpur City	Loan Return
31 May 2025	MF	(Malaysia) Danial Amier Norhisham	(Malaysia) Kuching City	Loan Return (Note: Danial Amier moves back to Kuching for another season of loan.)
31 May 2025	MF	(Malaysia) Syamer Kutty Abba	(Malaysia) Penang	Loan Return (Note: Syamer Kutty Abba moves to Kuala Lumpur City for a season long loan.)
31 May 2025	MF	(Syria) (Argentina) Jalil Elías	(Argentina) Vélez Sarsfield (Argentine Primera División)	Loan Return
31 May 2025	FW	(Argentina) Manuel Hidalgo	(Malaysia) Sri Pahang	Loan Return (Note: Manuel Hidalgo moves to Kuala Lumpur City for a season long loan.)
31 May 2025	FW	(Malaysia) Safawi Rasid	(Malaysia) Terengganu	Loan Return (Note: Safawi Rasid moves to Kuala Lumpur City for a season long loan.)
31 May 2025	FW	(Malaysia) Syafiq Ahmad	(Malaysia) Kedah Darul Aman	Loan Return
31 May 2025	FW	(Malaysia) Ramadhan Saifullah	(Malaysia) Kuching City	Loan Return (Note: Ramadhan Saifullah released by JDT after returning to the team as his contract ended & he moves back to Kuching City permanently.)
31 May 2025	FW	(Malaysia) (Scotland) Fergus Tierney	(Thailand) Nakhon Pathom United (Thai League 1)	Loan Return (Note: Fergus Tierney moves to Sabah for a season long loan.)
31 May 2025	FW	(Italy) (Romania) (Sweden) (Brazil) Nicolao Dumitru	(Indonesia) PSS Sleman (Liga 1)	Loan Return
1 June 2025	DF	(Spain) (Philippines) Antonio Glauder	(Spain) Cádiz (Segunda División)	Free
15 June 2025	FW	(Brazil) Jairo	(Cyprus) Pafos (Cypriot First Division)	Free
16 June 2025	MF	(Malaysia) Ibrahim Manusi	(Malaysia) Sri Pahang	Free
23 June 2025	DF	(Malaysia) (Spain) Jon Irazabal	Sabah (Azerbaijan Premier League)	Free
23 June 2025	MF	(Malaysia) (Netherlands) Hector Hevel	Portimonense (Liga Portugal 2)	Free
26 June 2025	FW	(Mali) (Spain) Moussa Sidibé	(Indonesia) Persis Solo (Liga 1)	Free
30 June 2025	MF	(Malaysia) (Brazil) Endrick	(Vietnam) Ho Chi Minh City (V.League 1)	Loan Return
30 June 2025	MF	(Portugal) Francisco Geraldes	(New Zealand) Wellington Phoenix (A-League Men)	Loan Return
1 July 2025	FW	(Malaysia) Haqimi Azim	(Malaysia) Kuala Lumpur City	Free (Note: Haqimi Azim returns to Kuala Lumpur City on loan for one season.)
6 July 2025	DF	(Argentina) (Italy) Jonathan Silva	(Spain) Getafe (Segunda División)	Free
6 July 2025	FW	(Malaysia) (Brazil) João Figueiredo	(Turkey) İstanbul Başakşehir (Süper Lig)	Undisclosed
9 July 2025	MF	(Malaysia) (Spain) (Cuba) Nacho Méndez	(Spain) Sporting Gijón (Segunda División)	Free
29 July 2025	MF	(Spain) (Philippines) Teto	(Spain) Tenerife (Segunda División)	Free
22 August 2025	FW	(Argentina) Manuel Hidalgo	(Malaysia) Kuala Lumpur City	Early loan termination (Note: Manuel Hidalgo returned to JDT after loan terminated early.)
1 September 2025	DF	(Spain) Raúl Parra	(Portugal) Estoril	Free
1 September 2025	DF	(Spain) Miguel Cuesta	(Spain) RCD Mallorca U19	Free
1 September 2025	FW	(Spain) Ager Aketxe	(Spain) Real Zaragoza	
JDT II
July 2025	FW	(Spain) Celso Bermejo	(Spain) Villarreal CF C (Tercera Federación)	Undisclosed

Mid-season

Date	Position	Player	Transferred from	Ref
1 January 2026	FW	(Brazil) Yago	(South Korea) FC Anyang (K League 1)	Free
2 January 2026	DF	(Malaysia) (England) Daniel Ting	(Malaysia) Sabah	End of Return (Note: Daniel Ting moves back to Sabah for another season of loan.)
2 January 2026	FW	(Brazil) Marcos Guilherme	(Japan) V-Varen Nagasaki	Free
3 January 2026	MF	(Portugal) Nené	(China) Yunnan Yukun (Chinese Super League)	Free
9 January 2026	FW	(Malaysia) Haqimi Azim	(Malaysia) Kuala Lumpur City	End of loan
12 January 2026	MF	(Malaysia) (England) Stuart Wilkin	(Malaysia) Sabah	Free
12 January 2026	MF	(Malaysia) Syamer Kutty Abba	(Malaysia) Kuala Lumpur City	End of loan
28 January 2026	FW	(Bosnia and Herzegovina) Ajdin Mujagić	(Malaysia) Sabah	Undisclosed
21 March 2026	MF	(Australia) Brad Tapp	(Australia) Central Coast Mariners	Undisclosed

=== Out ===
Preseason

Date	Position	Player	Transferred To	Ref
First team
1 June 2025	DF	(Malaysia) Azam Azmi	(Malaysia) Terengganu	Season loan (Note: Azam Azmi moves back to Terengganu for another season of loan.)
1 June 2025	DF	(Malaysia) (England) Daniel Ting	(Malaysia) Sabah	Season loan (Note: Daniel Ting moves back to Sabah.)
1 June 2025	DF	(Malaysia) (England) Declan Lambert	(Malaysia) Kuala Lumpur City	Season loan (Note: Declan Lambert moves back to KL FC for another season of loan.)
1 June 2025	MF	(Malaysia) (England) Ryan Lambert	(Malaysia) Kuala Lumpur City	Season loan (Note: Ryan Lambert moves back to KL FC for another season of loan.)
1 June 2025	MF	(Malaysia) Danial Amier Norhisham	(Malaysia) Kuching City	Season loan (Note: Danial Amier moves back to Kuching for another season of loan.)
12 June 2025	FW	(Malaysia) Ramadhan Saifullah	(Malaysia) Kuching City	Free
17 June 2025	GK	(Malaysia) Farizal Marlias	N.A.	Retired
17 June 2025	GK	(Malaysia) Izham Tarmizi	N.A.	Retired
17 June 2025	DF	(Indonesia) (Spain) Jordi Amat	(Indonesia) Persija Jakarta	Free
17 June 2025	DF	(Spain) Álvaro González	(Spain) CD Tenerife (S3)	Free
17 June 2025	DF	(Brazil) Murilo	(Finland) SJK	Free
17 June 2025	MF	(Brazil) Anselmo Moraes	(Australia) Adelaide United (A-League Men)	Free
17 June 2025	MF	(Spain) Roque Mesa	(Thailand) Ratchaburi	Free
17 June 2025	MF	(Spain) Jonathan Viera	(Spain) Las Palmas (Segunda División)	Free
17 June 2025	MF	(Malaysia) Safiq Rahim	N.A.	Retired
17 June 2025	FW	(Spain) Jesé	(Spain) Las Palmas (Segunda División)	Free
19 June 2025	FW	(Malaysia) Gabriel Nistelrooy	(Malaysia) Kuching City	Season loan
23 June 2025	FW	(Malaysia) (Scotland) Fergus Tierney	(Malaysia) Sabah	Season loan
2 July 2025	MF	(Malaysia) Syamer Kutty Abba	(Malaysia) Kuala Lumpur City	Season loan
2 July 2025	FW	(Malaysia) Safawi Rasid	(Malaysia) Kuala Lumpur City	Season loan
2 July 2025	FW	(Argentina) Manuel Hidalgo	(Malaysia) Kuala Lumpur City	Season loan
2 July 2025	FW	(Malaysia) Haqimi Azim	(Malaysia) Kuala Lumpur City	Season loan
19 July 2025	MF	(Malaysia) Syafiq Ahmad	(Brunei) DPMM	Season loan
24 July 2025	MF	(Syria) (Argentina) Jalil Elías	(Argentina) Tigre (Argentine Primera División)	Free
29 July 2025	FW	(Colombia) Jorge Obregón	(Colombia) Águilas Doradas (Categoría Primera A)	Free
1 August 2025	MF	(Malaysia) (Brazil) Endrick	(Vietnam) CAHCMC (V.League 1)	Undisclosed
5 August 2025	FW	(Spain) Juan Muñiz	(Australia) Adelaide United (A-League Men)	Free
7 August 2025	MF	(Portugal) Francisco Geraldes	(Brazil) Athletic (Série B)	Free
7 August 2025	FW	(Italy) (Romania) (Sweden) (Brazil) Nicolao Dumitru	(Malaysia) Kuala Lumpur City	Season loan
JDT II
4 June 2025	MF	(Malaysia) Chia Ruo Han	(Malaysia) Penang	Free
4 June 2025	MF	(Malaysia) Ahmad Irfan	(Malaysia) Penang	Free
1 July 2025	DF	(Malaysia) Firdaus Ramli	(Malaysia)	Free
1 July 2025	DF	(Malaysia) Syahrul Fazly	(Malaysia) ACEIO FC	Free
16 July 2025	MF	(Malaysia) Umar Hakeem	(Malaysia) Melaka	Season loan
16 July 2025	MF	(Malaysia) Aiman Danish	(Malaysia) Melaka	Season loan
19 July 2025	GK	(Malaysia) Haziq Aiman	(Malaysia) Melaka	Season loan

Mid-season

Date	Position	Player	Transferred To	Ref
7 October 2025	MF	(Spain) Iker Undabarrena	(South Korea) Incheon United (K League 1)	Free
2 January 2025	DF	(Malaysia) (England) Daniel Ting	(Thailand) Ratchaburi (Thai League 1)	Season loan
10 January 2025	FW	(Malaysia) Haqimi Azim	(Malaysia) Terengganu	Season loan
16 January 2025	FW	(Mali) (Spain) Moussa Sidibé	(Indonesia) Bhayangkara (Liga 1)	Free
January 2025	MF	(Spain) Samu Castillejo	(South Korea)	Free

== Friendly matches ==
Win Draw Loss

JDT

=== Tour of Spain (3–22 July 2025) ===
6 July 2025 1	(S5) Real Murcia Imperial (Spain)	0–4	(Malaysia) Johor Darul Ta'zim	Alicante, Spain
			Bergson 5'; Jairo 20'; Romel Morales 56', 64'	Stadium: Meliá Villaitana Football Center

7 July 2025 2	(S5) Club Costa City (Spain)	0–1	(Malaysia) Johor Darul Ta'zim	La Nucia, Spain
19:00 BST			Bergson 68'	Stadium: Estadi Olímpic Camilo Cano

9 July 2025 3	(E3) Cardiff City (Wales)	2–2	(Malaysia) Johor Darul Ta'zim	Murcia, Spain
19:00 BST	David Turnbull 46'; Rubin Colwill 62'	Report	Jairo 59'; Óscar Arribas 90+3'	Stadium: Pinatar Arena

12 July 2025 4	(S1) Levante (Spain)	0–0	(Malaysia) Johor Darul Ta'zim	Buñol, Spain
19:00 BST				Stadium: Buñol Sports City

14 July 2025 5	(S5) Valencia CF Mestalla (Spain)	1–0	(Malaysia) Johor Darul Ta'zim	La Nucia, Spain
	Jaume Dura 35'			Stadium: Estadi Olímpic Camilo Cano

16 July 2025 6	(Q1) Al-Rayyan SC (Qatar)	1–0	(Malaysia) Johor Darul Ta'zim	Murcia, Spain
				Stadium: San Pedro del Pinatar Sport Centre

19 July 2025 7	(Q1) Al-Arabi SC (Qatar)	Cancelled	(Malaysia) Johor Darul Ta'zim	Valencia, Spain
				Stadium: Oliva Nova Sports Center

21 July 2025 8	(S1) Al-Riyadh SC (Saudi Arabia)	0–1	(Malaysia) Johor Darul Ta'zim	La Nucia, Spain
		Report	Figueiredo 10'	Stadium: Estadi Olímpic Camilo Cano

=== Others ===
1 August 2025 1	Johor Darul Ta'zim (Malaysia)	12–0	(Singapore) Hougang United	Johor
	Arif Aiman 4'; Jairo Da Silva 7'; Hector Hevel 10'; João Figueiredo 12'; Jonathan Silva 20', 23'; Eddy Israfilov 26'; Óscar Arribas 56', 80', 84'; Romel Morales 62', 77'			Stadium: JDT Training Center

JDT II

19 July 2025 1	Melaka (Malaysia)	2–2	(Malaysia) Johor Darul Ta'zim II	Melaka
				Stadium: Hang Jebat Stadium

27 July 2025 2	Johor Darul Ta'zim II (Malaysia)	4–2	(Singapore) Geylang International	Johor
	Syukur Januri 9', 45'; Abdul Raziq 73', 90+2'			Stadium: Tan Sri Dato' Haji Hassan Yunos Stadium

5 September 2025 3	Johor Darul Ta'zim II (Malaysia)	2–5	(Singapore) BG Tampines Rovers	Johor
	Danish Syamer 10'; Rafiefikri Rosman 78'			Stadium: Tan Sri Dato' Haji Hassan Yunos Stadium

6 December 2025 4	Johor Darul Ta'zim II (Malaysia)	1–2	(Japan) Albirex Niigata (S)	Johor
				Stadium: JDT Training Center

== Competitions (JDT) ==
=== Overview ===
Competition	First match	Last match	Starting round	Final position	Record							
Competition	First match	Last match	Starting round	Final position	Pld	W	D	L	GF	GA	GD	Win %
Malaysia Super League (Note: Includes the Charity Shield.)	8 August 2025	10 May 2026	Matchday 1	Winners	24	23	1	0	117	10	+107	95.83
Malaysia FA Cup	16 August 2025	14 December 2025	Round of 16	Winners	7	7	0	0	24	5	+19	100.00
Malaysia Cup	18 January 2026	23 May 2026	Round of 16	Winners	7	7	0	0	29	3	+26	100.00
AFC Champions League Elite	16 September 2025	17 April 2026	League stage	Quarter-finals	11	4	2	5	12	11	+1	36.36
ASEAN Club Championship	21 August 2025	13 May 2026	Group stage	Semi-finals	7	4	2	1	16	8	+8	57.14
Total					56	45	5	6	198	37	+161	80.36

Source: Competitions

=== Malaysia Super League ===
Win Draw Loss

Update:

8 August 2025 1	Johor Darul Ta'zim	3–0	Selangor	Johor
	Jairo 1'; Eddy Israfilov 64'; Arif Aiman 73'; Park Jun-heong (yellow card) 19'		Faisal Halim (yellow card) 17'	Stadium: Sultan Ibrahim Stadium; Attendance: 32,777; Referee: Nazmi Nasaruddin; Man of the Match: (Brazil) Jairo

12 August 2025 2	Johor Darul Ta'zim	5–3	Negeri Sembilan	Johor
	Jon Irazabal 38' 57'; João Figueiredo 41' (yellow card) 90+4'; Arif Aiman 58'; Jairo (penalty missed) 70; Bergson 90+2'		Joseph Esso 8'; Jovan Motika 12', 60'; Ariff Ar-Rasyid Ariffin (yellow card) 34'; Harith Samsuri (yellow card) 45'	Stadium: Sultan Ibrahim Stadium; Referee: Nawal Zubir; Man of the Match: (Malaysia) (Spain) Jon Irazabal

24 August 2025 3	Kuching	0–1	Johor Darul Ta'zim	Kuching
	Yuki Tanigawa (red card) 49'		Jairo 61'; Manuel Hidalgo (yellow card) 73'; Eddy Israfilov (yellow card) 82'	Stadium: Sarawak State Stadium; Referee: Razlan Joffri Ali; Man of the Match: (Malaysia) Haziq Nadzli

28 August 2025 4	Immigration	0–3	Johor Darul Ta'zim	Georgetown
	Farid Nezal (yellow card) 74'		Jon Irazabal 43'; Jairo 58'; João Figueiredo 77'; Park Jun-heong (yellow card) 36'; Nacho Méndez (yellow card) 52'; Hong Wan (yellow card) 90'	Stadium: Penang State Stadium; Referee: Munir Izam; Man of the Match: (Malaysia) (Brazil) João Figueiredo

21 September 2025 5	Johor Darul Ta'zim	8–0	Sabah	Johor
	Óscar Arribas 6'; João Figueiredo 11', 23', 45+2'; Raúl Parra 44'; Bergson 61' (pen.), 74', 90+2'		Dominic Tan (yellow card) 28'; Gary Steven Robbat (yellow card) 72'; Dane Ingham (yellow card) 79'	Stadium: Sultan Ibrahim Stadium; Referee: Fusser Sallih; Man of the Match: (Brazil) Bergson

11 September 2025 6 (Rescheduled)	Johor Darul Ta'zim	6–0	Penang	Johor
	Jairo 9'; Arif Aiman 18', 31'; João Figueiredo 33'; Jon Irazabal 45+3'; Antonio Glauder 53'; Hector Hevel (yellow card) 82'		Firdaus Saiyadi (yellow card) 90+6'	Stadium: Sultan Ibrahim Stadium; Referee: Kamil Zakaria; Man of the Match: (Malaysia) Arif Aiman

5 October 2025 7	PDRM	0–7	Johor Darul Ta'zim	Selayang
	Arif Aiman 27', 33'; Bergson 54'; Eddy Israfilov 67'; Jairo 77', 85'; Romel Morales 83'	Report		Stadium: Selayang Stadium; Referee: Hasrol Amir; Man of the Match: (Malaysia) Arif Aiman

25 October 2025 8	Johor Darul Ta'zim	10–0	DPMM	Johor
	Bergson 9', 35' (pen.), 37', 73'; Óscar Arribas 45+1'; Manuel Hidalgo 56'; Yura Indera Putera 63' (o.g.); Arif Aiman 69'; Jairo 82'; Romel Morales 88'; Matt Davies (yellow card) 54'	Report	Syafiq Safiuddin Shariff (yellow card) 23' (yellow-red card) 32'	Stadium: Sultan Ibrahim Stadium; Referee: Ahmad Zuhadi Dzulkifli; Man of the Match: (Brazil) Bergson

31 October 2025 9	Terengganu	0–5	Johor Darul Ta'zim	Terengganu
	Gabriel Silva (yellow card) 40'	Report	Bergson 5'; Romel Morales 31'; Jairo 64', 71', 77'; Afiq Fazail (yellow card) 32'; Nacho Méndez (yellow card) 48'; Natxo Insa (yellow card) 75'; Eddy Israfilov (yellow card) 89'	Stadium: Sultan Mizan Zainal Abidin Stadium; Referee: Hasrol Amir; Man of the Match: (Brazil) Jairo

21 November 2025 10	Johor Darul Ta'zim	7–1	Melaka	Johor
	Jonathan Silva 6'; Bergson 32', 58'; Heberty 48', 90'; Teto Martín 50', 66'; Afiq Fazail (yellow card) 29'	Report	Abdul Azim 87'; Michael Ozor (yellow card) 30'; Juan Teles (yellow card) 39'	Stadium: Sultan Ibrahim Stadium; Referee: Nasruddin Tamrin; Man of the Match: (Brazil) Bergson

17 December 2025 11 (Rescheduled)	Kuala Lumpur	0–4	Johor Darul Ta'zim	Kuala Lumpur
	Giancarlo Gallifuoco (yellow card) 78'	Report	Cristian Glauder 28' (yellow card) 89'; Manuel Hidalgo 31'; Jairo da Silva 45'; Óscar Arribas Pasero 73'; Raúl Parra (yellow card) 48'; Nazmi Faiz (yellow card) 76'	Stadium: Kuala Lumpur Football Stadium; Referee: Razlan Joffri Ali; Man of the Match: (Malaysia) Ahmad Syihan

20 December 2025 12	Johor Darul Ta'zim	4–1	Kelantan	Johor
	Jairo da Silva 21'; Teto Martín 42'; Óscar Arribas 51'; Nazmi Faiz 56'; Raúl Parra (yellow card) 88'	Report	Azam Azih 75'	Stadium: Sultan Ibrahim Stadium; Referee: Nawal Zubir; Man of the Match: (Argentina) Manuel Hidalgo

4 January 2026 13	Selangor	0–2	Johor Darul Ta'zim	Petaling Jaya
	Zikri Khalili (yellow card) 90'	Report	Richmond Ankrah 7' (o.g.); Bergson 90+1'; Manuel Hidalgo (yellow card) 40'; Jairo da Silva (yellow card) 84'; Óscar Arribas (yellow card) 85'	Stadium: MBPJ Stadium; Referee: Nazmi Nasaruddin; Man of the Match: (Philippines) (Spain) Óscar Arribas

9 January 2026 14	Negeri Sembilan	0–1	Johor Darul Ta'zim	Paroi
	Oday Kharoub (yellow card) 33'; Wai Lin Aung (yellow card) 50'; Sang-su An (yellow card) 80'; Hadin Azman (yellow card) 80'; Filip Chinzorig (yellow card) 89'; Anwar Ibrahim (yellow card) 90'		Manuel Hidalgo 90+9'; Afiq Fazail (yellow card) 31'; Ager Aketxe (yellow card) 34'; La'Vere Corbin-Ong (yellow card) 51'; Óscar Arribas (yellow card) 90+10'	Stadium: Tuanku Abdul Rahman Stadium; Referee: S.Logeswaran

13 January 2026 15	Johor Darul Ta'zim	2–1	Kuching	Johor
	Ignacio Méndez 58'; Bergson 64'; Naxo Insa (red card) 56'		Scott Woods 41'; Yuki Tanigawa (yellow card) 64'; Filemon Anyie (yellow card) 90+6'	Stadium: Sultan Ibrahim Stadium; Referee: Razlan Joffri Ali

1 February 2026 16	Johor Darul Ta'zim	5–0	Immigration	Johor
	João Figueiredo 21'; Vinicius Milani Bueno 59' (o.g.); Bergson 61', 90+2'; Marcos Guilherme 67'; Syahmi Safari (yellow card) 31'; Afiq Fazail (yellow card) 45+1'			Stadium: Sultan Ibrahim Stadium

22 February 2026 17	Sabah	1–6	Johor Darul Ta'zim	Kota Kinabalu
	Chris Ondong 88'; Gary Steven Robbat (yellow card) 90+2'		Bergson 9' (pen.); Ajdin Mujagić 21', 40'; Óscar Arribas 24', 48'; Manuel Hidalgo 46'; Cristian Glauder (yellow card) 81' (yellow-red card)	Stadium: Likas Stadium; Referee: Zuhadi Dzulkifli

27 February 2026 18 (Rescheduled)	Penang	0–4	Johor Darul Ta'zim	Georgetown
			Marcos Guilherme 5'; Bergson 35', 68'; Óscar Arribas 90+1'; Jon Irazábal Iraurgui (yellow card) 42'	Stadium: City Stadium Penang

14 March 2026 19	DPMM	0–3	Johor Darul Ta'zim	Bandar Seri Begawan
	Nazirrudin Ismail (yellow card) 82'; Fairuz Zakaria (red card) 88'		Ager Aketxe 33' (yellow card) 75'; Óscar Arribas 73' (yellow card) 54'; Marcos Guilherme 77'; Cristian Glauder (yellow card) 84'	Stadium: Hassanal Bolkiah National Stadium

18 March 2026 20	Johor Darul Ta'zim	7–0	PDRM	Johor
	Yago 15'; Ignacio Méndez 21'; Stuart Wilkin 24', 51'; Jairo 81', 82'; Bergson 88'			Stadium: Sultan Ibrahim Stadium

11 April 2026 21	Johor Darul Ta'zim	1–1	Terengganu	Johor
	Bergson 23'; Eddy İsrafilov (yellow card) 90'		Ekhson Pandzhshanbe 36'; Ubaidullah Shamsul (yellow card) 48'; Rahadiazli Rahalim (yellow card) 72'	Stadium: Sultan Ibrahim Stadium

28 April 2026 22	Melaka	1–2	Johor Darul Ta'zim	Melaka
	Dino Kalesic 72'; Aiman Danish (yellow card) 83'		Ager Aketxe 44'; Marcos Guilherme 45+2'; Nazmi Faiz Mansor (yellow card) 53'	Stadium: Hang Jebat Stadium

2 May 2026 23	Johor Darul Ta'zim	7–0	Kuala Lumpur	Johor
	Ager Aketxe 18'; Óscar Arribas 34'; Stuart Wilkin 72', 74'; Ajdin Mujagić 82'; Eddy İsrafilov 84'; Manuel Hidalgo 90+2'; Cristian Glauder (yellow card) 64'		Dmytro Lytvyn (red card) 51'; Quincy Kammeraad (yellow card) 84'	Stadium: Sultan Ibrahim Stadium

10 May 2026 24	Kelantan	1–14	Johor Darul Ta'zim	Johor
	Farris Izdiham 65'		Bergson 1', 11', 38', 43', 53', 84'; Manuel Hidalgo 12', 26', 63'; Cristian Glauder 14'; Stuart Wilkin 39'; Jonathan Silva 50'; Syamer Kutty Abba 86'; Teto Martín 89'	Stadium: Sultan Ibrahim Stadium (Note: Match switch from Sultan Muhammad IV Stadium to Sultan Ibrahim Stadium upon Kelantan The Real Warriors FC request due to unpredictable weather conditions in Kota Bharu causing the field conditions at the Sultan Muhammad IV Stadium to be unsatisfactory and it was feared that the field would not be ready on that date.)

==== Table ====
Pos	Team	Pld	W	D	L	GF	GA	GD	Pts	Qualification or relegation
1	Johor Darul Ta'zim (C)	24	23	1	0	117	10	+107	70	Qualification for the AFC Champions League Elite league stage & ASEAN Club Championship group stage
2	Kuching City	24	16	5	3	45	14	+31	53	Qualification for the AFC Champions League Two group stage & ASEAN Club Championship group stage (Note: Since the winners of the 2025 Malaysia FA Cup, Johor Darul Ta'zim, had already qualified for the Champions League Elite via league position, the Champions League Two spot was passed to the second-placed team.)
3	Selangor	24	16	4	4	59	20	+39	52	
4	Kuala Lumpur City	24	12	7	5	40	29	+11	43	
5	Terengganu	24	10	6	8	39	34	+5	36	

Updated to match(es) played on 17 May 2026. Source: Malaysian Football League
Rules for classification: 1) Points; 2) Goal difference; 3) Number of goals scored.
(C) Champions

=== Malaysia FA Cup ===
16 August 2025 Round 1 Leg 1	UM-Damansara United	0–5	Johor Darul Ta'zim	Johor
			Jonathan Silva 45', 54'; Teto 78'; João Figueiredo 90' (pen.); Celso Bermejo 90+1'	Stadium: Sultan Ibrahim Stadium; Attendance: 3,957; Referee: Razlan Joffri Ali

2 October 2025 Round 1 Leg 2 (Rescheduled)	Johor Darul Ta'zim	5–3 (10–3 agg.)	UM-Damansara United	Johor
	Romel Morales 3', 70', 90+4' (pen.); Manuel Hidalgo 8'; Heberty Fernandes 15'		Thankgod Michael 62'; Shafizi Iqmal 66'; Anuar Ceesay 74'	Stadium: Sultan Ibrahim Stadium; Attendance: 6,241; Referee: Syed Fazeel Shah

JDT won 10–3 on aggregate.

17 October 2025 QF Leg 1	Penang	1–2	Johor Darul Ta'zim	Georgetown
	Adib Abdul Ra'op 36'; Haziq Kutty Abba (yellow card) 27'; Ahmad Irfan (red card) 45'	Report	Óscar Arribas 6' (yellow card) 73'; Ager Aketxe 56'; Park Jun-Heong (yellow card) 60'	Stadium: City Stadium Penang; Referee: Faizudin Ismail

28 October 2025 QF Leg 2	Johor Darul Ta'zim	3–0 (5–1 agg.)	Penang	Johor
	Bérgson 38'; J. Silva 42'; Israfilov 45+2'	Report		Stadium: Sultan Ibrahim Stadium; Referee: Izzul Fikri

JDT won 5–1 on aggregate.

8 November 2025 SF Leg 1	Kuching City	1–2	Johor Darul Ta'zim	Kuching
	Petrus Shitembi 69'; Rodney Celvin Akwensivie (yellow card) 42'; Ronald Ngah (yellow card) 45+2'		Bérgson 36', 50'; Matthew Davies (yellow card) 58'	Stadium: Sarawak State Stadium

29 November 2025 SF Leg 2	Johor Darul Ta'zim	2–0	Kuching City	Johor
	Bérgson 26'; Israfilov 83'	Report		Stadium: Sultan Ibrahim Stadium; Referee: Ahmad Zuhadi Dzulkifli

JDT won 4–1 on aggregate.

14 December 2025 Final	Johor Darul Ta'zim	5–0	Sabah	Kuala Lumpur
21:00 MYT	Jonathan Silva 8'; Rawilson Batuil 20' (o.g.); Jairo 23'; Óscar Arribas 64'; Manuel Hidalgo 90+2'; Park Jun-Heong (yellow card) 68'	Report	Miguel Cifuentes (yellow card) 7' (yellow-red card) 59'; Gary Steven Robbat (yellow card) 90'	Stadium: Bukit Jalil National Stadium; Attendance: 40,044; Referee: Kamil Zakaria

=== Malaysia Cup ===
17 January 2026 Rd of 16 Leg 1	PDRM	1–10	Johor Darul Ta'zim	Johor
	Imran Samso 61'		Teto Martín 3', 7', 50', 63', 73', 90+5'; Nazmi Faiz 47'; Marcos Guilherme 66', 90'; Manuel Hidalgo 87'; Sultan Ibrahim Stadium (Note: PDRM played their home matches at Sultan Ibrahim Stadium, Iskandar Puteri, instead of their regular home stadium Selayang Municipal Council Stadium, Selayang.)	Referee: Izzul Fikri

23 January 2026 Rd of 16 Leg 2	Johor Darul Ta'zim	1–0	PDRM	Johor
	Teto Martín 66'; Jonathan Silva (yellow card) 73'	Report	Imran Samso (yellow card) 57'; Fakhrulla Yusoff (yellow card) 60'	Stadium: Sultan Ibrahim Stadium; Referee: Firdaus Dahlan

Johor Darul Ta'zim won 11–1 on aggregate.

25 February 2026 QF Leg 1 (Rescheduled)	Melaka	1–3	Johor Darul Ta'zim	Krubong
	Ahmed Shamsaldin 90+2'	Report (FAM); Report (MFL)	La'Vere Corbin-Ong 7'; Jairo Da Silva 31', 55'	Stadium: Hang Jebat Stadium; Referee: Izzul Fikri

13 February 2026 QF Leg 2	Johor Darul Ta'zim	5–0	Melaka	Johor
	Ajdin Mujagić 5', 8', 61'; Manuel Hidalgo 72'; Marcos Guilherme 75'	Report (FAM); Report (MFL)		Stadium: Sultan Ibrahim Stadium; Referee: Hasrol Amir

Johor Darul Ta'zim won 8–1 on aggregate.

3 April 2026 SF Leg 1	Kuala Lumpur	0-4	Johor Darul Ta'zim	Kuala Lumpur
	Dmytro Lytvyn (yellow card) 30'	Report (FAM); Report (MFL)	Bérgson 5'; Ager Aketxe 31', 83'; Óscar Arribas 59'; Jairo Da Silva (yellow card) 37'; Stuart Wilkins (yellow card) 89'	Stadium: Kuala Lumpur Football Stadium; Referee: Nazmi Nasaruddinc

7 April 2026 SF Leg 2	Johor Darul Ta'zim	4–1	Kuala Lumpur	Johor
	Bérgson 48', 59' (penalty missed) 38; Syahmi Safari 51'; Ajdin Mujagić 89'; Syamer Kutty Abba (yellow card) 90'		Giancarlo Gallifuoco 67'; Zhafri Yahya (yellow card) 25'; Kamal Azizi (yellow card) 80'	Stadium: Sultan Ibrahim Stadium; Referee: Hasrol Amir

Johor Darul Ta'zim won 8–1 on aggregate.

23 May 2026 Final	Johor Darul Ta'zim	2–0	Kuching City	Kuala Lumpur
21:00 UTC+8	Marcos Guilherme 81'; Arif Aiman 90+1'; Afiq Fazail (yellow card) 3'		Ramadhan Saifullah (penalty missed) 63	Stadium: Bukit Jalil National Stadium; Referee: Mohammed Al-Shammari (Qatar)

=== AFC Champions League Elite ===
Win Draw Loss

==== Group stage ====
16 September 2025 MD 1	Buriram United (Thailand)	2–1	(Malaysia) Johor Darul Ta'zim	Buriram, Thailand
	Suphanat Mueanta 50'; Robert Žulj 53'; Filip Stojković (yellow card) 57'; Peter Zulj (yellow card) 90+4'; Ko Myeong-seok (yellow card) 90+5'	Report	Antonio Glauder 28'; Óscar Arribas (yellow card) 88'	Stadium: Chang Arena; Attendance: 21,937; Referee: Alireza Faghani (Australia)

30 September 2025 MD 2	Johor Darul Ta'zim (Malaysia)	0–0	(Japan) FC Machida Zelvia	Johor, Malaysia
	Afiq Fazail (yellow card) 30'	Report	Yuki Soma (penalty missed) 23	Stadium: Sultan Ibrahim Stadium; Attendance: 28,915; Referee: Kim Jong-hyeok (South Korea)

21 October 2025 MD 3	Chengdu Rongcheng (China)	0–2	(Malaysia) Johor Darul Ta'zim	Chengdu, China
	Dong Yanfeng (yellow card) 12'; Pedro Delgado (yellow card) 42'; Tim Chow (yellow card) 55'; Han Pengfei (yellow card) 59'; Tang Chuang (yellow card) 89'	Report	Óscar Arribas 5'; Nacho Méndez 61'; Jairo (yellow card) 13'; Jonathan Silva (yellow card) 30'	Stadium: Phoenix Hill Football Stadium; Attendance: 39,093; Referee: Abdulrahman Al-Jassim (Qatar)

5 November 2025 MD 4	Johor Darul Ta'zim (Malaysia)	3–1	(China) Shanghai Shenhua	Johor, Malaysia
	Jonathan Silva 48', 88'; Óscar Arribas 63' (yellow card) 58'; Shane Lowry (yellow card) 59'; Eddy Israfilov (yellow card) 74'	Report	Saulo Mineiro 71' (pen.) (yellow card) 82'; Xu Haoyang (yellow card) 68'; André Luís (yellow card) 75'; João Carlos Teixeira (yellow card) 82'; Wilson Manafá (yellow card) 90+7'	Stadium: Sultan Ibrahim Stadium; Attendance: 20,218; Referee: Adham Makhadmeh (Jordan)

25 November 2025 MD 5	Melbourne City (Australia)	2–0	(Malaysia) Johor Darul Ta'zim	Melbourne, Australia
	Max Caputo 2'; Medin Memeti 90+2'; Liam Bonetig (yellow card) 11'; Aziz Behich (yellow card) 25'; Zane Schreiber (yellow card) 59'; Patrick Beach (yellow card) 90+3'; Germán Ferreyra (yellow card) AF'	Report	Óscar Arribas (yellow card) 8'; Bergson (yellow card) 90+3'; Teto (yellow card) AF'	Stadium: Melbourne Rectangular Stadium; Attendance: 2,165; Referee: Adel Al-Naqbi (United Arab Emirates)

9 December 2025 MD 6	Johor Darul Ta'zim (Malaysia)	0–0	(China) Shanghai Port	Johor, Malaysia
	Antonio Glauder (yellow card) 30'	Report	Yang Shiyuan (yellow card) 47'; Zhang Linpeng (yellow card) 52'; Fu Huan (yellow card) 90+7'	Stadium: Sultan Ibrahim Stadium; Attendance: 19,760; Referee: Shaun Evans (Australia)

10 February 2026 MD 7	Sanfrecce Hiroshima (Japan)	2–1	(Malaysia) Johor Darul Ta'zim	Sanfrecce, Japan
	Akito Suzuki 18' (pen.), 48'; Hayao Kawabe (yellow card) 22'; Sota Nakamura (yellow card) 38'; Taishi Matsumoto (yellow card) 44'; Shuto Nakano (yellow card) 90+4'	Report	Marcos Guilherme 3'; Jonathan Silva (red card) 16'; Bergson (yellow card) 28'; João Figueiredo (yellow card) 38'; Nene (yellow card) 67'	Stadium: Edion Peace Wing Hiroshima; Attendance: 10,132; Referee: Ma Ning (China)

17 February 2026 MD 8	Johor Darul Ta'zim (Malaysia)	1–0	(Japan) Vissel Kobe	Johor, Malaysia
	Marcos Guilherme 73'	Report	Kaito Yamada (yellow card) 6'	Stadium: Sultan Ibrahim Stadium; Attendance: 31,673; Referee: Ilgiz Tantashev (Uzbekistan)

Pos	Team	Pld	W	D	L	GF	GA	GD	Pts	Qualification
4	(Thailand) Buriram United	8	4	2	2	10	8	+2	14	Advance to round of 16
5	(Australia) Melbourne City	8	4	2	2	9	7	+2	14	Advance to round of 16
6	(Malaysia) Johor Darul Ta'zim	8	3	2	3	8	7	+1	11	Advance to round of 16
7	(South Korea) FC Seoul	8	2	4	2	10	9	+1	10	Advance to round of 16
8	(South Korea) Gangwon FC	8	2	3	3	9	11	−2	9	Advance to round of 16

Source: AFC
Rules for classification: 1) points; 2) goal difference; 3) number of goals scored; 4) number of matches won; 5) penalty shoot-out if only two teams remain tied and played each other on the final matchday 6) fair play ranking; 7) drawing of lots

==== Knockout stage ====
4 March 2026 R16 Leg 1	Johor Darul Ta'zim (Malaysia)	3–1	(Japan) Sanfrecce Hiroshima	Johor, Malaysia
	Ager Aketxe 52'; Bergson 63' (yellow card) 64'; Marcos Guilherme 85'; Antonio Glauder (yellow card) 59'; Óscar Arribas (yellow card) 90+3'	Report	Nene 86' (o.g.); Kim Ju-Sung (yellow card) 7' (yellow-red card) 26'	Stadium: Sultan Ibrahim Stadium; Attendance: 31,225; Referee: Shaun Evans (Australia)

11 March 2025 R16 Leg 2	Sanfrecce Hiroshima (Japan)	1–0 (2–3 agg.)	(Malaysia) Johor Darul Ta'zim	Sanfrecce, Japan
	Kosuke Kinoshita 90' (pen.); Ryo Germain (yellow card) 33'; Kosuke Kinoshita (yellow card) 61'	Report	Jairo (yellow card) 29'; Nene (yellow card) 38'; Ager Aketxe (yellow card) 48'	Stadium: Edion Peace Wing Hiroshima; Referee: Khaled Al-Hoish (Saudi Arabia)

17 April 2026 Quarter Final	Al-Ahli (Saudi Arabia)	2–1	(Malaysia) Johor Darul Ta'zim	Jeddah, Saudi Arabia
	Franck Kessie 45+2'; Galeno 55'; Ali Majrashi (red card) 41'; Ivan Toney (yellow card) 45+5'; Valentin Atangana (yellow card) 73'; Édouard Mendy (yellow card) 84'	Report	Ali Majrashi 19' (o.g.); Marcos Guilherme (yellow card) 29'; Jonathan Silva (yellow card) 41'; Naxto Insa (yellow card) 41'; Nene (yellow card) 75'; Ager Aketxe (yellow card) 85'; Yago (yellow card) 90+2'	Stadium: King Abdullah Sports City Stadium; Referee: Adham Makhadmeh (Jordan)

=== ASEAN Club Championship ===
==== Group stage ====
Pos	Team	Pld	W	D	L	GF	GA	GD	Pts	Qualification	NDI	JDT	PKR	BKU	LCS	SUN
1	(Vietnam) Nam Định	5	4	1	0	13	3	+10	13	Advance to knockout stage	—	1–1	2–1	—	3–0	—
2	(Malaysia) Johor Darul Ta'zim	5	3	2	0	13	4	+9	11	Advance to knockout stage	—	—	—	4–0	3–1	3–0
3	(Cambodia) Preah Khan Reach Svay Rieng	5	2	2	1	9	5	+4	8		—	2–2	—	1–1	—	—
4	(Thailand) Bangkok United	5	1	2	2	6	12	−6	5		1–4	—	—	—	2–2	2–1
5	(Singapore) Lion City Sailors	5	1	1	3	6	12	−6	4		—	—	0–2	—	—	3–2
6	(Myanmar) Shan United	5	0	0	5	3	14	−11	0		0–3	—	0–3	—	—	—

Source: ASEAN United FC
Rules for classification: Tiebreakers

21 August 2025 1	Johor Darul Ta'zim (Malaysia)	3–1	(Singapore) Lion City Sailors	Johor, Malaysia
	João Figueiredo 11' (pen.), 16'; Arif Aiman 90+3'; Afiq Fazail (yellow card) 78'; Bergson (yellow card) 83'	Report	Shawal Anuar 90+5'; Safuwan Baharudin (yellow card) 8'; Rui Pires (yellow card) 45+3'	Stadium: Sultan Ibrahim Stadium; Attendance: 13,143; Referee: Koji Takasaki (Japan)

25 September 2025 2	Johor Darul Ta'zim (Malaysia)	4–0	(Thailand) Bangkok United	Johor, Malaysia
	Bergson 46', 73', 90+2'; João Figueiredo 52'; Afiq Fazail (yellow card) 68'	Report	Philipe Maia (yellow card) 45+3'; Everton (yellow card) 45+3'	Stadium: Sultan Ibrahim Stadium; Referee: Kim Hee-gon (South Korea)

4 December 2025 3	PKR Svay Rieng (Cambodia)	2–2	(Malaysia) Johor Darul Ta'zim	Svay Rieng, Cambodia
	Cristian Roque 29' (yellow card) 69'; Nhean Sosidan 37'; Dimong Sophal (yellow card) 39'; Vireak Dara (yellow card) 56'; Soeuy Visal (yellow card) 59'	Report	Shane Lowry 90+2' (yellow card) 51'; La'Vere Corbin-Ong 90+6'; Hong Wan (yellow card) 15'; Samu Castillejo (yellow card) 35'; Park Jun-Heong (yellow card) 64'; Matthew Davies (yellow card) 90+8'	Stadium: Svay Rieng Stadium; Referee: Kim Woo-sung (South Korea)

29 January 2026 4	Johor Darul Ta'zim (Malaysia)	3–0	(Myanmar) Shan United	Johor, Malaysia
	Óscar Arribas 65'; Bergson 67', 71'; Jon Irazábal (yellow card) 38'; Feroz Baharudin (yellow card) 39'	Report		Stadium: Sultan Ibrahim Stadium; Referee: Rustam Lutfullin (Uzbekistan)

5 February 2026 5	Nam Định (Vietnam)	1–1	(Malaysia) Johor Darul Ta'zim	Ninh Bình, Vietnam
	Nguyễn Văn Vĩ 33'; Caio Cesar (penalty missed) 33' (pen.); Percy Tau (penalty missed) 35' (pen.); Rômulo (yellow card) 28'; Lâm Ti Phông (yellow card) 82'	Report	Bergson 87' (pen.); Syahmi Safari (yellow card) 30'; Hector Hevel (yellow card) 34'; Feroz Baharudin (yellow card) 82'	Stadium: Thiên Trường Stadium; Referee: Hiroki Kasahara (Japan)

==== Knockout stage ====
6 May 2026 Semi Final Leg 1	Johor Darul Ta'zim (Malaysia)	1–3	(Thailand) Buriram United	Johor, Malaysia
	Ager Aketxe 90+2'; Antonio Glauder (yellow card) 29'; Óscar Arribas (yellow card) 51'; Nene (yellow card) 83'	Report	Guilherme Bissoli 34', 90+4'; Goran Čaušić 45+2'; Supachai Chaided (yellow card) 49'; Kenneth Dougall (yellow card) 51'; Theerathon Bunmathan (yellow card) 88'	Stadium: Sultan Ibrahim Stadium; Referee: Qasim Al-Hatmi (Oman)

13 May 2026 Semi Final Leg 2	Buriram United (Thailand)	1–2 (a.e.t.) (4–3 agg.)	(Malaysia) Johor Darul Ta'zim	Buriram, Thailand
	Kingsley Schindler 98'; Pansa Hemviboon (yellow card) 10'; Curtis Good (yellow card) 33'; Kenneth Dougall (yellow card) 35'; Neil Etheridge (yellow card) 44'; Guilherme Bissoli (yellow card) 64' (yellow-red card) 103'; Goran Čaušić (red card) 115'; Peter Zulj (yellow card) 116'	Report	Bergson 45+4' (pen.); Marcos Guilherme 62'; Ager Aketxe (yellow card) 34'; Óscar Arribas (yellow card) 38'; Eddy Israfilov (yellow card) 55'; Mohamadou Sumareh (yellow card) 114'	Stadium: Chang Arena; Referee: Kim Woo-sung (South Korea)

== Competitions (JDT II) ==
=== Malaysia A1 Semi-Pro League ===
Win Draw Loss

Update:

10 August 2025 1	UM-Damansara United	0–1	Johor Darul Ta'zim	Negeri Sembilan
		Report	Alif Mutalib 80'	Stadium: Arena IRC; Referee: Faizal Talib

16 August 2025 2	Johor Darul Ta'zim	0–1	Seoul Phoenix	Pasir Gudang
		Report	Faris Danish 51' (o.g.)	Stadium: Pasir Gudang Corporation Stadium; Referee: Usaid Jamal

18 October 2025 3 (Rescheduled)	Johor Darul Ta'zim	1–0	Kedah FA	Pasir Gudang
	Danish Hakimi 3'	Report		Stadium: Pasir Gudang Corporation Stadium; Referee: Firdaus Dahlan

15 September 2025 4	Perlis GSA	0–4	Johor Darul Ta'zim	Kangar
		Report	Syukur Fariz 8'; Zaid El Basheer 16'; Franco Casquete 31'; Shafizan Arshad 58'	Stadium: Tuanku Syed Putra Stadium; Referee: Afdzal Hilmi

20 September 2025 5	Johor Darul Ta'zim	1–2	Perak	Pasir Gudang
	Celso Bermejo	Report		Stadium: Pasir Gudang Corporation Stadium; Referee: Haziq Iqmal

26 September 2025 6	Johor Darul Ta'zim	6–1	Machan	Pasir Gudang
	Miquel Cuesta 8', 79'; Danish Hakimi 38'; Daryl Sham 48'; Franco Casquete 82'; Celso Bermejo 88'	Report		Stadium: Pasir Gudang Corporation Stadium; Referee: Latiffi Zahrom

6 October 2025 7	Kelantan Red Warrior	0–0	Johor Darul Ta'zim	Kota Bharu
		Report		Stadium: Sultan Muhammad IV Stadium; Referee: Faizul Ridzuan

12 October 2025 8	Johor Darul Ta'zim	1–0	Malaysian University	Pasir Gudang
	Franco Casquete 17'	Report		Stadium: Pasir Gudang Corporation Stadium; Referee: Syed Fazeel Shah

27 October 2025 9	Manjung City	0–1	Johor Darul Ta'zim	Seri Manjung
		Report	Danish Hakimi 30'	Stadium: Manjung Municipal Council Stadium; Referee: Zukarnain Zakaria

1 November 2025 10	Johor Darul Ta'zim	2–2	ATM FA	Pasir Gudang
	Danish Syamer Tajuddin 79', 90+5'	Report	Faiz Ibrahim 10'; Hairul Iqmal 48'	Stadium: Pasir Gudang Corporation Stadium; Referee: Usaid Jamal

8 November 2025 11	Kedah Darul Aman	0–6	Johor Darul Ta'zim	Jitra
		Report	Syukur Fariz 4', 37'; Aysar Hadi 20'; Danish Syamer 25' (pen.); Ziad El Basheer 45'; Daryl Sham 90+4'	Stadium: MPKP Mini Stadium; Referee: Kamal Yaacob

14 November 2025 12	Johor Darul Ta'zim	3–0	Bunga Raya	Pasir Gudang
	Franco Casquete 27'; Celso Bermejo 37', 45+2'	Report		Stadium: Pasir Gudang Corporation Stadium; Referee: Haziq Iqmal

5 January 2026 13 (Rescheduled)	Selangor II	0–1	Johor Darul Ta'zim	Petaling Jaya
		Report	Alif Ahmad 3'	Stadium: Petaling Jaya Stadium; Referee: Faizudin Ismail

21 December 2025 14	Johor Darul Ta'zim	0–0	Wan Tendong Stable	Pasir Gudang
		Report		Stadium: Pasir Gudang Corporation Stadium; Referee: Usaid Jamal

27 December 2025 15	Immigration II	1–2	Johor Darul Ta'zim	Serdang
	Michael Achange 34'	Report	Celso Bermejo 23'; Alif Ahmad 77'	Stadium: UPM Stadium; Referee: Zukarnain Zakaria

11 January 2026 16	Seoul Phoenix	0–9	Johor Darul Ta'zim	Cyberjaya
		Report	Celso Bermejo 5', 39', 79'; Danish Syamer 11', 28'; Miquel Cuesta 15'; Rafiefikri Rosman 32'; Adam Farhan 77'; Danish Zahir 89'	Stadium: MMU Stadium; Referee: Nasruddin Tamrin

18 January 2026 17	Johor Darul Ta'zim	2–0	UM-Damansara United	Pasir Gudang
	Celso Bermejo 5'; Daryl Sham 85'	Report		Stadium: Pasir Gudang Corporation Stadium; Referee: Akmal Osman

26 January 2026 18	Kedah FA	1–0	Johor Darul Ta'zim	Alor Setar
	Rahmat Makasuf 17'	Report		Stadium: Darul Aman Stadium; Referee: Kamal Yaacob

2 February 2026 19	Johor Darul Ta'zim	6–1	Perlis GSA	Pasir Gudang
	Celso Bermejo 4' (pen.), 50', 68' (pen.), 86'; Miquel Cuesta 32'; Alif Mutalib 55'	Report	Shukor Azmi 71' (pen.)	Stadium: Pasir Gudang Corporation Stadium; Referee: Latiffi Zahrom

28 April 2026 20 (Rescheduled)	Perak FA	v	Johor Darul Ta'zim	Chemor
				Stadium: Chepor SSI Mini Stadium, Perak Football Complex

13 February 2026 21	Machan	1–3	Johor Darul Ta'zim	Melaka City
	Aminu Maiga 43'	Report	Danish Syamer 36'; Celso 63' (pen.)	Stadium: Hang Tuah Stadium; Referee: Firdaus Dahlan

30 March 2026 22	Johor Darul Ta'zim	2–1	Kelantan Red Warrior	Pasir Gudang
		Report		Stadium: Pasir Gudang Corporation Stadium

==== Table ====
Locations of teams in the 2025–26 Malaysia A1 Semi-Pro
Klang Valley

Pos	Team	Pld	W	D	L	GF	GA	GD	Pts	Qualification or relegation
1	Johor Darul Ta'zim II (C)	28	19	6	3	64	17	+47	63	Ineligible for promotion (Note: Parent team in Malaysia Super League / developmental team)
2	Selangor II	28	19	4	5	63	20	+43	61	Ineligible for promotion
3	Kedah FA (Note: Did not apply for a national license)	28	17	6	5	46	16	+30	57	
4	Kelantan Red Warrior (X)	28	17	5	6	64	15	+49	56	Qualified to the 2026 Malaysia Cup & promotion to the 2026–27 Malaysia Super League
5	Perak FA (Note: Did not apply for a national license) (X)	28	15	10	3	50	18	+32	55	Qualified to the 2026 Malaysia Cup

Updated to match(es) played on 24 May 2026. Source: AFL
Rules for classification: 1) Points; 2) Goal difference; 3) Number of goals scored.
(C) League champion; (X) Qualified to the 2026 Malaysia Cup

== Club statistics ==
Correct as of match played @ 23 May 2026

No.	Pos.	Player	Malaysia Super League		Charity Shield		FA Cup		Malaysia Cup		AFC Champions League Elite		ASEAN Club Championship		Total	
No.	Pos.	Player	Apps.	Goals	Apps.	Goals	Apps.	Goals	Apps.	Goals	Apps.	Goals	Apps.	Goals	Apps.	Goals
1	GK	(Malaysia) (Spain) Christian Abad Amat	2	0	0	0	2	0	5	0	0	0	0	0	9	0
2	DF	(Malaysia) (Australia) Matthew Davies	6+4	0	0	0	2	0	1	0	0	0	0+1	0	14	0
3	DF	(Malaysia) Shahrul Saad	5+2	0	0	0	4	0	0	0	0+1	0	1+2	0	15	0
4	MF	(Malaysia) Afiq Fazail	16+3	0	0	0	4+1	0	3+2	0	6+3	0	3+2	0	41	0
5	DF	(Spain) (Philippines) Antonio Glauder	16	3	0	0	4	0	3	0	10	1	4	0	37	4
6	MF	(Malaysia) (England) Hong Wan	1+5	0	0	0	1+1	0	0	0	0	0	1	0	9	0
7	MF	(France) (Philippines) Enzo Lombardo	0	0	0	0	0+1	0	0	0	0	0	0	0	1	0
8	MF	(Malaysia) (Netherlands) Hector Hevel	5+2	0	0	0	0	0	1+1	0	1	0	4	0	13	0
9	FW	(Malaysia) (Brazil) Bergson	16+6	27	0	0	4	4	5	3	3+6	0	3+2	7	45	41
11	FW	(Brazil) Jairo	13+2	14	0	0	4+2	1	2+1	2	9+2	0	5+1	0	41	17
12	MF	(Malaysia) (England) Stuart Wilkin	2+4	5	0	0	0	0	1+3	0	0	0	0+2	0	12	5
13	DF	(South Korea) Park Jun-heong	7+1	0	0	0	4+1	0	3	0	0	0	2	0	18	0
14	DF	(Republic of Ireland) (Australia) Shane Lowry	0	0	0	0	0	0	0	0	0+5	0	3+1	1	9	1
15	DF	(Malaysia) Feroz Baharudin	2+2	0	0	0	0	0	6+1	0	0	0	1+1	0	13	0
16	GK	(Malaysia) Syihan Hazmi	21	0	0	0	5	0	2	0	2	0	4	0	34	0
17	DF	(Malaysia) (Spain) Jon Irazabal	8	4	0	0	0	0	0	0	1+1	0	3	0	13	4
18	MF	(Portugal) Nené	1	0	0	0	0	0	4	0	4	0	1	0	10	0
19	FW	(Malaysia) (Colombia) Romel Morales	3+2	3	0	0	3+2	3	0	0	0	0	0	0	10	6
20	MF	(Spain) (Philippines) Teto	6+6	4	0	0	3+2	1	4+2	7	0+5	0	1	0	29	12
21	MF	(Malaysia) Nazmi Faiz	0+8	0	0	0	3+1	0	2+1	0	0	0	1+2	0	18	0
22	DF	(Malaysia) (Canada) Corbin-Ong	11+3	0	0	0	3+3	0	5+1	1	0	0	4	1	30	1
23	MF	(Azerbaijan) (Spain) Eddy Israfilov	16	3	0	0	4	2	2	0	10	0	4	0	36	5
24	MF	(Philippines) (Spain) Óscar Arribas	18+3	9	0	0	4	2	4	1	9+1	2	4	1	43	15
25	FW	(Malaysia) (Brazil) João Figueiredo	7+2	7	0	0	0+1	1	2+1	0	3	0	3+1	3	20	11
26	MF	(Malaysia) (The Gambia) Mohamadou Sumareh	0+2	0	0	0	0+1	0	0	0	0	0	1+1	0	5	0
27	MF	(Malaysia) Ibrahim Manusi	0	0	0	0	0+1	0	0	0	0	0	0	0	1	0
28	MF	(Malaysia) (Spain) (Cuba) Nacho Méndez	21+3	2	0	0	4+2	0	5	0	9+1	1	5+1	0	51	3
29	FW	(Bosnia and Herzegovina) Ajdin Mujagić	3+3	3	0	0	0	0	1+2	4	0	0	0	0	9	7
30	MF	(Malaysia) (Spain) Natxo Insa	3+6	0	0	0	4+1	0	1	0	5+2	0	0+2	0	24	0
33	DF	(Argentina) (Italy) Jonathan Silva	8+1	2	0	0	4+1	4	2+2	0	9	2	2+1	0	30	8
36	DF	(Spain) Raúl Parra	3+2	1	0	0	0	0	3	0	9+1	0	0	0	18	1
37	FW	(Brazil) Heberty Fernandes	0+6	2	0	0	3+2	1	0	0	0	0	0+2	0	13	3
41	MF	(Malaysia) Syamer Kutty Abba	0+3	1	0	0	0	0	0+2	0	0	0	1+2	0	8	1
42	FW	(Malaysia) Arif Aiman	8+1	7	0	0	2	0	0+1	1	4	0	2	1	18	9
47	MF	(Spain) Ager Aketxe	12+3	3	0	0	1+1	1	3+1	2	4+4	1	2	1	30	8
50	MF	(Malaysia) (Sweden) Junior Eldstål	0	0	0	0	0+1	0	0	0	0	0	0	0	1	0
58	GK	(Spain) Andoni Zubiaurre	0	0	0	0	1	0	0	0	8	0	3	0	12	0
70	FW	(Spain) Samu Castillejo	2+2	0	0	0	0+2	0	0	0	0+1	0	2	0	9	0
71	MF	(Malaysia) Alif Mutalib	0	0	0	0	0	0	0	0	0	0	0	0	0	0
77	FW	(Spain) Celso Bermejo	0+1	0	0	0	0+2	1	0	0	0+2	0	0	0	5	1
80	MF	(Malaysia) Danish Hakimi	0	0	0	0	0	0	0	0	0	0	0	0	0	0
81	MF	(Malaysia) (Philippines) Daryl Sham	0	0	0	0	0	0	0	0	0	0	0	0	0	0
82	MF	(Malaysia) Fakrul Haikal	0	0	0	0	0	0	0	0	0	0	0	0	0	0
88	FW	(Malaysia) (Argentina) Manuel Hidalgo	7+10	7	0	0	2+3	2	1+5	2	0+3	0	2	0	33	11
91	DF	(Malaysia) Syahmi Safari	7+4	0	0	0	0	0	3+4	0	0	0	1+2	0	21	0
95	FW	(Brazil) Marcos Guilherme	3+6	4	0	0	0	0	2+3	4	5	2	2	1	20	11
97	FW	(Brazil) Yago	2+7	1	0	0	0	0	2+2	0	0+4	0	1+1	0	19	1
Players who have contracts but have left on loan to other clubs
??	DF	(Malaysia) (England) Declan Lambert	0	0	0	0	0	0	0	0	0	0	0	0	0	0
??	MF	(Malaysia) (England) Ryan Lambert	0	0	0	0	0	0	0	0	0	0	0	0	0	0
??	DF	(Malaysia) Azam Azmi	0	0	0	0	0	0	0	0	0	0	0	0	0	0
??	MF	(Malaysia) Danial Amier Norhisham	0	0	0	0	0	0	0	0	0	0	0	0	0	0
??	MF	(Malaysia) Syamer Kutty Abba	0	0	0	0	0	0	0	0	0	0	0	0	0	0
??	FW	(Malaysia) Safawi Rasid	0	0	0	0	0	0	0	0	0	0	0	0	0	0
??	FW	(Malaysia) Syafiq Ahmad	0	0	0	0	0	0	0	0	0	0	0	0	0	0
??	FW	(Malaysia) (Scotland) Fergus Tierney	0	0	0	0	0	0	0	0	0	0	0	0	0	0
39	FW	(Malaysia) Gabriel Nisterroy	0	0	0	0	0	0	0	0	0	0	0	0	0	0
Players who have played this season but had left the club
18	MF	(Spain) Iker Undabarrena	1	0	0	0	0	0	0	0	0	0	0	0	1	0
94	FW	(Mali) (Spain) Moussa Sidibe	1+1	0	0	0	2	0	0	0	0	0	1	0	5	0
??	MF	(Portugal) Francisco Geraldes	0	0	0	0	0	0	0	0	0	0	0	0	0	0
