= 2025 Malaysia FA Cup final =

Association football championship match

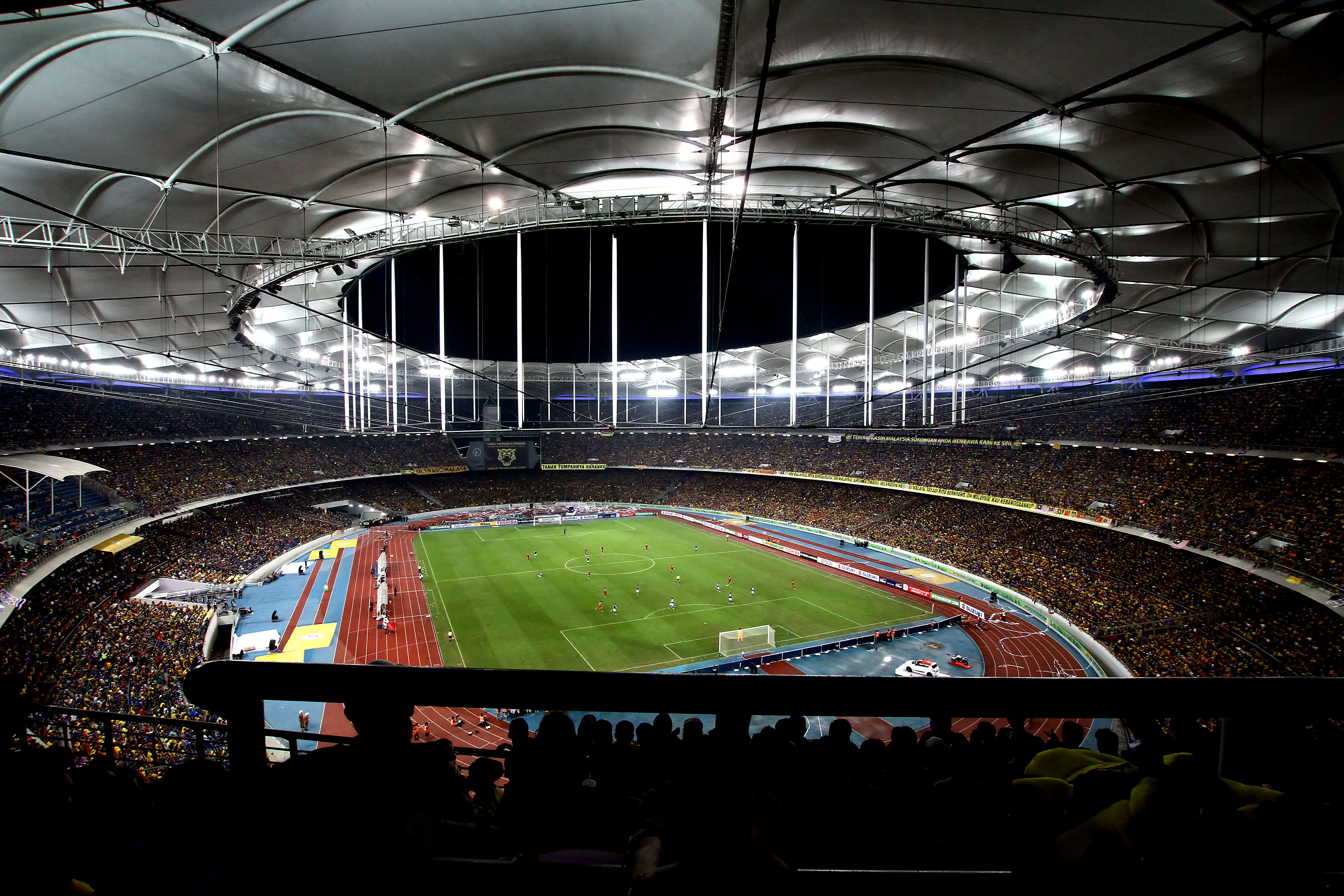
- The match took place at Bukit Jalil National Stadium.
- Event: 2025 Malaysia FA Cup
Johor Darul Ta'zim	Sabah
5	0
- Date: 14 December 2025
- Venue: Bukit Jalil National Stadium, Bukit Jalil, Kuala Lumpur
- Man of the Match: Manuel Hidalgo (Johor Darul Ta'zim)
- Referee: Kamil Zakaria
- Attendance: 40,044
- Weather: Good; 29 °C (84 °F)

The 2025 Malaysia FA Cup final was an association football match between Johor Darul Ta'zim and Sabah on 14 December 2025 at Bukit Jalil National Stadium, Bukit Jalil, Kuala Lumpur. It was the 36th FA Cup final overall and was the showpiece match of Malaysian football's primary cup competition, the Malaysian Football Association Challenge Cup (Malaysia FA Cup), organised by the Football Association of Malaysia and Malaysian Football League.

Johor Darul Ta'zim won the match 5–0 for their 5th FA Cup title. As winners, Johor Darul Ta'zim qualified for the group stage of the 2026–27 AFC Champions League Two.

== Background ==
The Malaysian League competition schedule, which includes the FA Cup competition, has been released by the Malaysian Football League. The final match schedule is anticipated to take place on 14 December 2025.

== Route to the final ==
Note: In all results below, the score of the finalist is given first (H: home; A: away).

Johor Darul Ta'zim				Round	Sabah			
Opponent	Agg.	1st leg	2nd leg	Knockout phase	Opponent	Agg.	1st leg	2nd leg
UM-Damansara United	13–3	5–0 (A)	5–3 (H)	Round of 16	Bunga Raya	6–0	6–0 (A)	0–0 (H)
Penang	5–1	2–1 (A)	3–0 (H)	Quarter-finals	Kelantan The Real Warriors	5–2	2–1 (A)	3–1 (H)
Kuching City	4–1	2–1 (A)	2–0 (H)	Semi-finals	Selangor	5–5 (5–4 p)	2–2 (H)	3–3 (a.e.t.) (A)

== Match ==
=== Details ===
14 December 2025
21:00 MYT

Johor Darul Ta'zim	5–0	Sabah
J. Silva 8'; Rawilson 20' (o.g.); Jairo 23'; Arribas 64'; Hidalgo 90+2'	Report

Bukit Jalil National Stadium, Bukit Jalil
Attendance: 40,044
Referee: Kamil Zakaria

Johor Darul Ta'zim	Sabah

GK	16	(Malaysia) Syihan Hazmi
CB	3	(Malaysia) Shahrul Saad
CB	5	(Spain) Antonio Glauder
CB	23	(Azerbaijan) Eddy Israfilov		(substituted off) 16'
RM	24	(Philippines) Óscar Arribas
CM	4	(Malaysia) Afiq Fazail
CM	30	(Malaysia) Natxo Insa (c)		(substituted off) 59'
LM	33	(Argentina) Jonathan Silva		(substituted off) 59'
AM	28	(Malaysia) Nacho Méndez
CF	11	(Brazil) Jairo
CF	88	(Argentina) Manuel Hidalgo
Substitutes:
GK	1	(Spain) Christian Abad
DF	13	(South Korea) Park Jun-heong	(yellow card) 69'	(substituted on) 16'	(substituted off) 78'
DF	22	(Malaysia) Corbin-Ong		(substituted on) 59'
DF	50	(Malaysia) Junior Eldstål
DF	91	(Malaysia) Syahmi Safari
MF	6	(Malaysia) Hong Wan
MF	21	(Malaysia) Nazmi Faiz
MF	20	(Spain) Teto		(substituted on) 78'
FW	37	(Brazil) Heberty		(substituted on) 59'
Coach:
(Spain) Xisco Muñoz

GK	31	(Malaysia) Damien Lim		(substituted off) 74'
RB	23	(New Zealand) Dane Ingham
CB	2	(Malaysia) Rawilson Batuil (c)		(substituted off) 55'
CB	14	(Australia) Dean Pelekanos
LB	5	(Malaysia) Daniel Ting
CM	10	(Spain) Miguel Cifuentes	(yellow card) 7' (yellow-red card) 49'
CM	22	(Malaysia) Stuart Wilkin
RM	11	(Malaysia) Jafri Firdaus		(substituted off) 74'
AM	28	(Malaysia) Darren Lok		(substituted off) 74'
LM	15	(Malaysia) Fergus Tierney
CF	21	(Bosnia and Herzegovina) Ajdin Mujagić		(substituted on) 45+1'
Substitutes:
GK	19	(Malaysia) Khairul Fahmi		(substituted on) 74'
DF	13	(Malaysia) Dinesh Rajasingam		(substituted on) 55'
DF	33	(Malaysia) Dominic Tan
DF	76	(Malaysia) Rozacklye Yanam
MF	8	(Malaysia) Farhan Roslan		(substituted on) 74'
MF	20	(Malaysia) Gary Steven Robbat	(yellow card) 90'	(substituted on) 45+1'
MF	70	(Malaysia) Fakrul Iman
FW	30	(Malaysia) Shahrol Nizam
FW	72	(Malaysia) Harith Naem		(substituted on) 74'
Coach:
(Mauritius) Jean-Paul de Marigny

Man of the Match:
Manuel Hidalgo (Johor Darul Ta'zim)

Assistant referees:
Shafiq Ahmad Said
Saharudin Ishak
Fourth official:
Izzul Fikri
Video assistant referee:
Khairulsyahmi Ahmad Khalidi
Assistant video assistant referee:
Shukri Haron

Match rules

- 90 minutes
- 30 minutes of extra time if necessary
- Penalty shoot-out if scores still level
- Nine named substitutes
- Maximum of five substitutions, with a sixth allowed in extra time (Note: Each team was given only three opportunities to make substitutions, with a fourth opportunity in extra time, excluding substitutions made at half-time, before the start of extra time and at half-time in extra time.)

== See also ==
- 2026 Malaysia Cup
- 2026 MFL Challenge Cup
