= 2025 Malaysia FA Cup =

Tournament details
- Country: Malaysia
- Dates: 16 August – 14 December 2025
- Teams: 16

Final positions
- Champions: Johor Darul Ta'zim (5th title)
- Runners-up: Sabah

Tournament statistics
- Matches played: 29
- Goals scored: 117 (4.03 per match)
- Top goal scorer(s): (7 goals); Ajdin Mujagić
- All statistics correct as of 14 December 2025. (Note: All statistics do not include qualifying play-offs)

The 2025 Malaysia FA Cup was the 35th edition of the Malaysia FA Cup, a knockout competition for Malaysian association football clubs. The FA Cup is the main domestic cup competition for men's football teams in Malaysia. The tournament proper starting on 16 August 2025. The winners, if eligible, would be assured a place in the 2026–27 AFC Champions League Two group stage.

Johor Darul Ta'zim (JDT) are the three-time defending champions, having beaten Selangor in the last final.

== Qualified teams ==
The FA Cup is a knockout competition with 16 teams taking part all trying to reach the final at Bukit Jalil National Stadium on 14 December 2025. The competition consisted of 13 teams from the Super League and 3 teams from A1 Semi-Pro League. The competition were represented by foreign clubs for the first time since 2015, where Brunei-based club DPMM FC, will compete in the tournament as an invited club.

The following teams played in the competition. Reserve teams were excluded.

Malaysia Super League the 13 teams of the 2025–26 season	Malaysia A1 Semi-Pro League the 3 teams of the 2025–26 season
(Brunei) DPMM; Immigration; Johor Darul Ta'zim; Kelantan The Real Warriors; Kuching City; Kuala Lumpur City; Melaka; Negeri Sembilan; Penang; PDRM; Sabah; Selangor; Terengganu	Bunga Raya; Malaysian University; UM-Damansara United

== Format ==
The Malaysian Football League (MFL) announced a same format where only 16 teams will be involved in this competition. The final stages of the competition would feature a format change: The round of 16, quarter-finals and semi-finals will be played two legs (home & away), except for the final which was played as a single leg. Accordingly, if in a two-legged tie two teams scored the same number of aggregate goals, the winner of the tie would not be decided by the number of away goals scored by each team but always by 30 minutes of extra time, and if the two teams scored the same number of goals in extra time, the winner would be decided by a penalty shoot-out.

== Seeding ==
The seeded teams were drawn against the unseeded teams, with the seeded teams become hosting for the round of 16.

For the draw, the teams were seeded and unseeded into two pots based on the following principles (introduced starting this season):

- Pot A contained the final standings of top 8 teams from 2024–25 Super League.
- Pot B contained the final standings of 9th until 13th placed teams from 2024–25 Super League, and the 3 teams selected from 2025–26 A1 Semi-Pro League, based on subject approval from the MFL Board of Directors.

Key to colours
Teams from 2025–26 Malaysia Super League
Teams from 2025–26 Malaysia A1 Semi-Pro League

Pot A (seeded)
Rank	Team
1	Johor Darul Ta'zim
2	Selangor
3	Sabah
4	Kuching City
5	Terengganu
6	Kuala Lumpur City
7	PDRM
8	Penang

Pot B (unseeded)
Rank	Team
9	Negeri Sembilan
10	Kelantan The Real Warriors
11	Melaka (P)
12	Immigration (P)
13	(Brunei) DPMM (Inv.)
14	Bunga Raya
15	Malaysian University
16	UM-Damansara United

Note: (P) – Promoted.
Note: (Inv.) – Invited teams.

== Draw dates ==
The draw for the 2025 Malaysia FA Cup was held on 28 July 2025.

Phase	Round	First leg	Second leg
Knockout phase	Round of 16	16–18 August 2025	12–15 & 30 September & 2 October 2025
Knockout phase	Quarter-finals	17–18 October 2025	28–29 October 2025
Knockout phase	Semi-finals	9 November 2025	30 November 2025
Knockout phase	Final	14 December 2025	

== Bracket ==
The bracket was decided after the draw.

Round of 16
Immigration	2	0	2
Terengganu	1	3	4
(Brunei) DPMM	3	1	4
Kuching City	2	7	9
Melaka	0	0	0
Penang	2	3	5
UM-Damansara United	0	3	3
Johor Darul Ta'zim	5	5	10
Kelantan The Real Warriors	3	0	3
Kuala Lumpur City	1	1	2
Bunga Raya	0	0	0
Sabah	6	0	6
Negeri Sembilan	5	0	5
PDRM	0	1	1
Malaysian University	1	0	1
Selangor	3	9	12

Quarter-finals
Terengganu	1	2	3
Kuching City	4	1	5
Penang	1	0	1
Johor Darul Ta'zim	2	3	5
Kelantan The Real Warriors	1	1	2
Sabah	2	3	5
Negeri Sembilan	0	3	3
Selangor	4	2	6

Semi-finals
Kuching City	1	0	0
Johor Darul Ta'zim	2	2	4
Sabah (p)	2	3	5 (5)
Selangor	2	3	5 (4)

Final
Johor Darul Ta'zim	5
Sabah	0

== Round of 16 ==
A total of 16 teams played in the Round of 16. Ties were scheduled to be played in the week commencing 16 August 2025. The first legs were played on 16, 17 and 18 August, and the second legs were played on 12, 13, 14, 15, 30 September and 2 October 2025.

Key: (1) = Super League; (2) = A1 Semi-Pro League

=== Summary ===
Team 1	Agg.	Team 2	1st leg	2nd leg
UM-Damansara United (2)	3–10	Johor Darul Ta'zim (1)	0–5	3–5
Malaysian University (2)	1–12	Selangor (1)	1–3	0–9
DPMM (1) (Brunei)	4–9	Kuching City (1)	3–2	1–7
Immigration (1)	2–4	Terengganu (1)	2–1	0–3
Bunga Raya (2)	0–6	Sabah (1)	0–6	0–0
Melaka (1)	0–5	Penang (1)	0–2	0–3
Negeri Sembilan (1)	5–1	PDRM (1)	5–0	0–1
Kelantan The Real Warriors (1)	3–2	Kuala Lumpur City (1)	3–1	0–1

=== Matches ===
First leg

16 August 2025
20:15 MYT

UM-Damansara United (2)	0–5	Johor Darul Ta'zim (1)
	Report	J. Silva 45', 54'; Teto 79'; Figueiredo 89' (pen.); Bermejo 90+1'

Sultan Ibrahim Stadium, Iskandar Puteri (Note: UM-Damansara United played their home matches at Sultan Ibrahim Stadium, Iskandar Puteri, instead of their regular home stadium UM Arena Stadium, Kuala Lumpur respectively, which did not meet MFL requirements.)
Attendance: 3,957
Referee: Razlan Joffri Ali

Second leg

2 October 2025
20:15 MYT

Johor Darul Ta'zim (1)	5–3	UM-Damansara United (2)
Morales 3', 71', 90+4'; Hidalgo 8'; Heberty 15'	Report	Michael 62'; Shafizi 66'; Ceesay 74'

Sultan Ibrahim Stadium, Iskandar Puteri
Attendance: 6,241
Referee: Syed Fazeel Shah

Johor Darul Ta'zim won 10–3 on aggregate.

First leg

16 August 2025
17:00 MYT

Malaysian University (2)	1–3	Selangor (1)
Aiman 83'	Report	Faisal 4', 44'; Fortes 24'

MBPJ Stadium, Petaling Jaya (Note: Malaysian University played their home matches at MBPJ Stadium, Petaling Jaya, instead of their regular home stadium USIM Stadium, Nilai respectively, which did not meet MFL requirements.)
Attendance: 1,772
Referee: Firdaus Dahlan

Second leg

13 September 2025
20:15 MYT

Selangor (1)	9–0	Malaysian University (2)
Deeromram 12', 48'; Cheng 21'; Chrigor 45+6', 76', 80'; Fortes 55'; Clough 70'; Zikri 90+2'	Report

MBPJ Stadium, Petaling Jaya
Attendance: 2,392
Referee: Afiq Naim

Selangor won 12–1 on aggregate.

First leg

16 August 2025
20:15 MYT

DPMM (1) (Brunei)	3–2	Kuching City (1)
Azwan 6'; Oliveira 48'; Murray 79'	Report	R. Ngah 43'; Okwuosa 47'

Hassanal Bolkiah National Stadium, Bandar Seri Begawan
Attendance: 3,960
Referee: Tuan Mohd Yaasin

Second leg

14 September 2025
20:15 MYT

Kuching City (1)	7–1	(Brunei) DPMM (1)
R. Ngah 2', 53'; Danial 13', 78'; Indera Putera 45+1' (o.g.); Ramadhan Saif. 59'; João Pedro 90+2'	Report	Ramadhan San. 58'

Sarawak State Stadium, Kuching
Attendance: 6,500
Referee: Fusser Mad Sallih

Kuching City won 9–4 on aggregate.

First leg

17 August 2025
17:00 MYT

Immigration (1)	2–1	Terengganu (1)
R. Holstein 54'; João Pedro 90+1'	Report	Mabella 50'

Penang State Stadium, Batu Kawan
Attendance: 410
Referee: Khairulsyahmi Ahmad Khalidi

Second leg

13 September 2025
21:00 MYT

Terengganu (1)	3–0	Immigration (1)
Junior 18'; Akhyar 32', 54'	Report

Sultan Mizan Zainal Abidin Stadium, Kuala Nerus
Attendance: 4,870
Referee: Izzul Fikri

Terengganu won 4–2 on aggregate.

First leg

17 August 2025
16:45 MYT

Bunga Raya (2)	0–6	Sabah (1)
	Report	Lok 11', 48', 53' (pen.); Tierney 19'; Jafri 45+1' (pen.); Mujagić 81'

Tuanku Abdul Rahman Stadium, Paroi
Attendance: 90
Referee: Ahmad Zuhadi Dzulkifli

Second leg

30 September 2025 (Note: The match was originally scheduled for 13 September 2025.)
16:45 MYT

Sabah (1)	0–0	Bunga Raya (2)
	Report

Tuanku Abdul Rahman Stadium, Paroi (Note: Sabah played their home matches at Tuanku Abdul Rahman Stadium, Paroi, instead of their regular home stadium Likas Stadium, Kota Kinabalu.)
Attendance: 106
Referee: Faisal Ridzuan

Sabah won 6–0 on aggregate.

First leg

17 August 2025
21:00 MYT

Melaka (1)	0–2	Penang (1)
	Report	Wenzel-Halls 48', 81'

Hang Jebat Stadium, Krubong
Attendance: 2,979
Referee: Nawal Zubir

Second leg

15 September 2025
21:00 MYT

Penang (1)	3–0	Melaka (1)
Brundo 11'; Haziq 39'; Tchétché 80'	Report

City Stadium, George Town
Attendance: 885
Referee: S. Logeswaran

Penang won 5–0 on aggregate.

First leg

18 August 2025
21:00 MYT

Negeri Sembilan (1)	5–0	PDRM (1)
Motika 2', 40'; Esso 45', 83'; Tsuneyasu 76'	Report

Tuanku Abdul Rahman Stadium, Paroi
Attendance: 4,506
Referee: Zamzaidi Katimin

Second leg

12 September 2025
21:00 MYT

PDRM (1)	1–0	Negeri Sembilan (1)
Fakhrul 4'	Report

Selayang Stadium, Selayang
Attendance: 1,950
Referee: Nawal Zubir

Negeri Sembilan won 5–1 on aggregate.

First leg

18 August 2025
21:00 MYT

Kelantan The Real Warriors (1)	3–1	Kuala Lumpur City (1)
Ifedayo 5', 17'; Selvaraj 64'	Report	Syamer 87'

Sultan Muhammad IV Stadium, Kota Bharu
Attendance: 1,420
Referee: Faizudin Ismail

Second leg

14 September 2025
20:15 MYT

Kuala Lumpur City (1)	1–0	Kelantan The Real Warriors (1)
Víctor Ruiz 71'	Report

Kuala Lumpur Stadium, Cheras
Attendance: 1,871
Referee: Khairulsyahmi Ahmad Khalidi

Kelantan The Real Warriors won 3–2 on aggregate.

== Quarter-finals ==
The first legs were played on 17 and 18 October, and the second legs were played on 28 and 29 October 2025.

Key: (1) = Super League; (2) = A1 Semi-Pro League

=== Summary ===
Team 1	Agg.	Team 2	1st leg	2nd leg
Penang (1)	1–5	Johor Darul Ta'zim (1)	1–2	0–3
Kelantan The Real Warriors (1)	2–5	Sabah (1)	1–2	1–3
Negeri Sembilan (1)	3–6	Selangor (1)	0–4	3–2
Terengganu (1)	3–5	Kuching City (1)	1–4	2–1

=== Matches ===
First leg

17 October 2025
20:30 MYT

Penang (1)	1–2	Johor Darul Ta'zim (1)
Adib 35'	Report	Arribas 6'; Aketxe 55'

City Stadium, George Town
Attendance: TBC
Referee: Faizudin Ismail

Second leg

28 October 2025
20:15 MYT

Johor Darul Ta'zim (1)	3–0	Penang (1)
Bérgson 38'; J. Silva 42'; Israfilov 45+2'	Report

Sultan Ibrahim Stadium, Iskandar Puteri
Attendance: TBC
Referee: Izzul Fikri

Johor Darul Ta'zim won 5–1 on aggregate.

First leg

17 October 2025
21:00 MYT

Kelantan The Real Warriors (1)	1–2	Sabah (1)
A. Sesay 17'	Report	Jafri 13'; Mujagić 44'

Sultan Muhammad IV Stadium, Kota Bharu
Attendance: TBC
Referee: Usaid Jamal

Second leg

29 October 2025
20:15 MYT

Sabah (1)	3–1	Kelantan The Real Warriors (1)
Mujagić 10', 21', 56' (pen.)	Report	Lyngbø 45+2'

Likas Stadium, Kota Kinabalu
Attendance: TBC
Referee: Zamzaidi Katimin

Sabah won 5–2 on aggregate.

First leg

18 October 2025
20:30 MYT

Negeri Sembilan (1)	0–4	Selangor (1)
	Report	Faisal 34', 63'; Chrigor 46'; Clough 56'

Tuanku Abdul Rahman Stadium, Paroi
Attendance: 25,550
Referee: Kamil Zakaria

Second leg

29 October 2025
21:00 MYT

Selangor (1)	2–3	Negeri Sembilan (1)
Lira 42'; Faisal 87'	Report	Harith 12'; Javabilaarivin 27'; Tsuneyasu 80'

MBPJ Stadium, Petaling Jaya
Attendance: 7,517
Referee: Ahmad Zuhadi Dzulkifli

Selangor won 6–3 on aggregate.

First leg

18 October 2025
21:00 MYT

Terengganu (1)	1–4	Kuching City (1)
Mabella 68' (pen.)	Report	R. Ngah 9', 13' (pen.); Danial 53'; Mabella 82' (o.g.)

Sultan Mizan Zainal Abidin Stadium, Kuala Nerus
Attendance: TBC
Referee: Hasrol Amir

Second leg

28 October 2025
19:45 MYT

Kuching City (1)	1–2	Terengganu (1)
R. Ngah 32' (pen.)	Report	Careca 12', 90+3'

Sarawak State Stadium, Kuching
Attendance: TBC
Referee: Fusser Mad Sallih

Kuching City won 5–3 on aggregate.

== Semi-finals ==
The first legs were played on 9 November, and the second legs were played on 30 November 2025.

Key: (1) = Super League; (2) = A1 Semi-Pro League

=== Summary ===
Team 1	Agg.	Team 2	1st leg	2nd leg
Kuching City (1)	1–4	Johor Darul Ta'zim (1)	1–2	0–2
Sabah (1)	5–5 (5–4 p)	Selangor (1)	2–2	3–3 (a.e.t.)

=== Matches ===
First leg

9 November 2025
19:30 MYT

Kuching City (1)	1–2	Johor Darul Ta'zim (1)
Shitembi 69'	Report	Bérgson 36', 50'

Sarawak State Stadium, Kuching
Attendance: 16,500
Referee: Shukor Zulkiflee

Second leg

30 November 2025
20:15 MYT

Johor Darul Ta'zim (1)	2–0	Kuching City (1)
Bérgson 26'; Israfilov 83'	Report

Sultan Ibrahim Stadium, Iskandar Puteri
Attendance: TBC
Referee: Ahmad Zuhadi Dzulkifli

Johor Darul Ta'zim won 4–1 on aggregate.

First leg

9 November 2025
20:15 MYT

Sabah (1)	2–2	Selangor (1)
Mujagić 13', 90+1'	Report	Ingham 65' (o.g.); Laine 80'

Likas Stadium, Kota Kinabalu
Attendance: TBC
Referee: Nazmi Nasaruddin

Second leg

30 November 2025
21:00 MYT

Selangor (1)	3–3 (a.e.t.)	Sabah (1)
Faisal 33', 73'; Chrigor 51'	Report	Ingham 47'; Mujagić 62', 88' (pen.)
Penalties
Lira (penalty scored); Noor (penalty scored); Izwan (penalty scored); Mukhairi (penalty scored); Harith (penalty missed); Abualnadi (penalty missed)	4–5	(penalty missed) Mujagić; (penalty scored) Lok; (penalty scored) Wilkin; (penalty scored) Ting; (penalty scored) Dinesh; (penalty scored) Ingham

MBPJ Stadium, Petaling Jaya
Attendance: 0 (Note: Selangor was punished with playing behind closed doors (without spectators) following incidents involving supporter misconduct during the second leg of the quarter-finals against Negeri Sembilan at the MBPJ Stadium, Petaling Jaya on 29 October.)
Referee: Hasrol Amir

5–5 on aggregate. Sabah won 5–4 on penalties.

== Final ==
The final will be played at the Bukit Jalil National Stadium in Kuala Lumpur.

14 December 2025
21:00 MYT

Johor Darul Ta'zim (1)	5–0	Sabah (1)
J. Silva 8'; Rawilson 20' (o.g.); Jairo 23'; Arribas 64'; Hidalgo 90+2'	Report

Bukit Jalil National Stadium, Kuala Lumpur
Attendance: 40,044
Referee: Kamil Zakaria

== Top scorers ==
As of 14 December 2025

Rank	Player	Club	Goals
1	(Bosnia and Herzegovina) Ajdin Mujagić	Sabah	9
2	(Malaysia) Faisal Halim	Selangor	7
3	(Cameroon) Ronald Ngah	Kuching City	6
4	(Brazil) Chrigor	Selangor	5
5	(Argentina) Jonathan Silva	Johor Darul Ta'zim	4
5	(Brazil) Bérgson	Johor Darul Ta'zim	4
7	(Malaysia) Romel Morales	Johor Darul Ta'zim	3
7	(Malaysia) Danial Asri	Kuching City	3
7	(Malaysia) Darren Lok	Sabah	3
10	14 players	7 clubs	2
11	41 players	14 clubs	1

=== Own goals ===
Rank	Player	Team	Against	Date	Goal
1	(Brunei) Indera Putera	(Brunei) DPMM FC	Kuching City	14 September 2025	1
1	(Republic of the Congo) Yann Mabella	Terengganu	Kuching City	18 October 2025	1
1	(New Zealand) Dane Ingham	Sabah	Selangor	9 November 2025	1
1	(Malaysia) Rawilson Batuil	Sabah	Johor Darul Ta'zim	14 December 2025	1

== See also ==
- 2025 Piala Sumbangsih
- 2025–26 Malaysia Super League
- 2026 Malaysia Cup
- 2026 MFL Challenge Cup
