= Christian Abad =

Spanish footballer (born 2006)

Personal information
- Full name: Christian Abad Amat
- Date of birth: 5 August 2006 (age 20)
- Place of birth: Muro de Alcoy, Spain
- Height: 1.83 m (6 ft 0 in)
- Position: Goalkeeper

Team information
- Current team: Johor Darul Ta'zim
- Number: 1

Youth career
- 2013–2016: Muro
- 2016–2021: Valencia
- 2021–2024: Elche Ilicitano

Senior career*
Years	Team	Apps	(Gls)
2024–	Johor Darul Ta'zim	3	(0)
- * Club domestic league appearances and goals as of 17 January 2026

Christian Abad Amat (born 5 August 2006) is a Spanish professional footballer who plays as a goalkeeper for Malaysia Super League side Johor Darul Ta'zim.

== Club career ==
=== Muro ===
Born in Muro de Alcoy, Alicante, Abad started his career with local side Muro in 2013, and stayed with the club until 2016. At the age of 10, he joined the youth academy of Valencia, where he stayed until the under-15 selection. In his last season with Valencia, Abad chose to train on loan with another local team Alcoyano.

=== Elche Ilicitano ===
In 2021, Abad moved to the youth academy of Elche Ilicitano. In the 2022–23 season of the Liga Nacional Juvenil (the second-tier of Spanish youth football), Abad started 22 of 29 matches for the B team. He conceded 13 goals, achieving the lowest average (0.6 goals per match) among first-year goalkeepers in the league. With his involvement, the team made history by winning their group title for the first time.

=== Johor Darul Ta'zim ===
On 29 July 2024, at the age of 17, Abad decided to join Malaysian Super League champions Johor Darul Ta'zim, signing his first professional contract. He was signed as a long-term investment, potentially competing with Syihan Hazmi for the starting position.

== International career ==
Abad was named in Malaysia's 27-man preliminary squad for the third round of the 2027 AFC Asian Cup qualification in March 2025. He joined centralised training in Johor Bahru ahead of Malaysia’s opening qualification match against Nepal. Despite no official confirmation regarding his eligibility from the Football Association of Malaysia (FAM) or Johor Darul Ta'zim, his inclusion in training led to media reports identifying him as a potential heritage player.

== Style of play ==
Abad's coach at Elche Ilicitano described him as a solid goalkeeper in front of goal and skilled in one-on-one situations. He also commented on his strength to fight for the ball in the air and on the ground, as well as his intelligence in reading the game and quick adaptation to tactical instructions.

== Personal life ==
Born in Spain, Abad is of Malaysian descent.

== Honours ==
Johor Darul Ta'zim

- Malaysia Super League: 2024–25
- Malaysia FA Cup: 2024
- Malaysia Cup: 2024–25
