= Stuart Wilkin =

Footballer (born 1998)

Personal information
- Full name: Stuart John Wilkin
- Date of birth: 12 March 1998 (age 28)
- Place of birth: Woking, England
- Height: 1.80 m (5 ft 11 in)
- Position: Midfielder

Team information
- Current team: Johor Darul Ta'zim
- Number: 12

Youth career
- –2016: Southampton

College career
Years	Team	Apps	(Gls)
2016–2019	Missouri State Bears	73	(9)

Senior career*
Years	Team	Apps	(Gls)
2019–2020	Metropolitan Police	4	(1)
2021–2022	Johor Darul Ta'zim II	16	(1)
2022	→ Sabah (loan)	25	(2)
2023–2026	Sabah	84	(15)
2026–	Johor Darul Ta'zim	5	(1)

International career^{‡}
2022–	Malaysia	37	(8)
Medal record
Men's football
Representing Malaysia
FIFA ASEAN Cup
Third place	2026
Merdeka Tournament
Runner-up	2023
King's Cup
Runner-up	2022
AFF Championship
Third place	2022
- * Club domestic league appearances and goals as of 1:33, 25 June 2026 (UTC) ‡ National team caps and goals as of 6 October 2026

Stuart John Wilkin (born 12 March 1998) is a professional footballer who plays as a midfielder for Malaysia Super League club Johor Darul Ta'zim. Mainly a central midfielder, he is also capable of playing as an attacking midfielder or defensive midfielder. Born in England, he plays for the Malaysia national team.

== Youth career ==
As a youth player, Wilkin joined the youth academy of English Premier League side Southampton. He played in the 2015–16 Professional U21 Development League where he make his only appearance against Everton U21 on 26 October 2015 playing the entire match.

In July 2016, Wilkin joined the Missouri State Bears in the United States.

== Club career ==
=== Metropolitan Police ===
In 2019, Wilkin signed a one-year deal with a Southern Premier South side Metropolitan Police. He made four appearances with the team and scored one goal.

=== Johor Darul Ta'zim II ===
Before the start of the 2021 Malaysia Premier League season, Wilkin signed for Malaysian second-tier club Johor Darul Ta'zim II in January 2021.

==== Sabah (loan) ====
Before the start of the 2022 Malaysia Super League season, Wilkin was sent on loan to Sabah in the Malaysian top flight on 1 December 2022. On 4 March 2022, he debuted for Sabah during a 0–1 loss to Negeri Sembilan. For the 2022 Malaysia Super League season, he made 18 appearances and scored two goals for the team.

=== Sabah ===
On 1 December 2022, Wilkin signed a permanent deal for the Malaysia Super League side Sabah with a two-year contract.

Wilkin scored his first AFC Cup goal in a 5–0 thrashing away win over Indonesian club PSM Makassar on 4 October 2023

On 3 November 2024, Wilkin recorded a hat-trick of assist in a 4–1 win over Kelantan Darul Naim.

On 1 November 2025, Wilkin make his 100th appearance for the club in a 2–1 lost to Selangor. He then played an instrumental role helping Sabah to reach the 2025 Malaysia FA Cup final facing against eventual champions Johor Darul Ta'zim on 14 December. On 12 January 2026, he left the club by mutual consent.

=== Johor Darul Ta'zim ===
On 13 January 2026, Wilkin was announced as a Johor Darul Ta'zim player, donning the number 12 jersey ahead of the remaining 2025–26 season.

== International career ==
In November 2022, Wilkin earned his first call-up to the Malaysia national team for its training camp ahead of the 2022 AFF Championship. On 9 December 2022, he made his debut against Cambodia and scored his first international goal in the match at the Bukit Jalil National Stadium.

Wilkin also represented the nation at the 2023 AFC Asian Cup held in Qatar where he played in all of the nation's matches.

== Personal life ==
Born in England, Wilkin is of mixed English and Malaysian descent.

== International goals ==
No.	Date	Venue	Opponent	Score	Result	Competition
1.	9 December 2022	Bukit Jalil National Stadium, Kuala Lumpur, Malaysia	Cambodia	4–0	4–0	Friendly
2.	24 December 2022	Bukit Jalil National Stadium, Kuala Lumpur, Malaysia	Laos	5–0	5–0	2022 AFF Championship
3.	3 January 2023	Bukit Jalil National Stadium, Kuala Lumpur, Malaysia	Singapore	2–0	4–1	2022 AFF Championship
4.	3 January 2023	Bukit Jalil National Stadium, Kuala Lumpur, Malaysia	Singapore	3–0	4–1	2022 AFF Championship
5.	14 November 2024	PAT Stadium, Bangkok, Thailand	Laos	2–1	3–1	Friendly
6.	8 December 2024	Phnom Penh Olympic Stadium, Phnom Penh, Cambodia	Cambodia	1–0	2–2	2024 ASEAN Championship
7.	4 September 2025	Bukit Jalil National Stadium, Kuala Lumpur, Malaysia	Singapore	1–0	2–1	Friendly
8.	1 October 2026	Si Jalak Harupat Stadium, Bandung, Indonesia	Singapore	2–0	6–0	2026 FIFA ASEAN Cup

== Honours ==
Johor Darul Ta'zim

- Malaysia Cup: 2026

Malaysia

- King's Cup runner-up: 2022
- Pestabola Merdeka runner-up: 2023
