= Syihan Hazmi =

Malaysian professional footballer

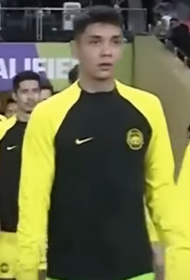
- Syihan in 2023

Personal information
- Full name: Ahmad Syihan Hazmi bin Mohamed
- Date of birth: 22 February 1996 (age 30)
- Place of birth: Kubang Kerian, Kelantan, Malaysia
- Height: 1.85 m (6 ft 1 in)
- Position: Goalkeeper

Team information
- Current team: Johor Darul Ta'zim
- Number: 16

Youth career
- 2012: Bukit Jalil Sports School
- 2013–2014: Harimau Muda C
- 2015–2017: Kelantan

Senior career*
Years	Team	Apps	(Gls)
2016–2017	Kelantan	0	(0)
2018–2019	Negeri Sembilan	2	(0)
2020–2021	Petaling Jaya City	8	(0)
2022–2023	Negeri Sembilan	22	(0)
2023–	Johor Darul Ta'zim	57	(0)

International career^{‡}
2016–2017	Malaysia U23	7	(0)
2022–	Malaysia	39	(0)
Medal record
Men's football
Representing Malaysia
FIFA ASEAN Cup
Third place	2026 Indonesia	Team
King's Cup
Runner-up	2022 Thailand	Team
Merdeka Tournament
Winner	2024 Malaysia	Team
- * Club domestic league appearances and goals as of 17 January 2026 ‡ National team caps and goals as of 6 October 2026

Ahmad Syihan Hazmi bin Mohamed (Jawi: احمد شيهن هزمي بن محمد, IPA: [ahmad syɪhan hazmɪ bɪn mohamed]; born 22 February 1996), better known as Syihan Hazmi, is a Malaysian professional footballer who plays as a goalkeeper for Malaysia Super League club Johor Darul Ta'zim and the Malaysia national team.

Syihan has won the Best Goalkeeper Award presented by the FAM Football Awards three times

== Club career ==
=== Youth ===
Syihan started his career with Bukit Jalil Sports School in 2012. The following year, he joined Harimau Muda C which was competing in the 2013 Malaysia FAM League.

=== Kelantan ===
After being released by Harimau Muda C, Syihan signed with Kelantan in January 2016 but his playing time was limited to the Malaysia President's Cup. His only official appearances for Kelantan were in the final group stage match of 2016 Malaysia Cup against Pahang on 20 August 2016 where Kelantan lost 2–0. He also saved a penalty taken by Kogileswaran Raj in that match.

=== Negeri Sembilan ===
In December 2017, Syihan joined Negeri Sembilan for the upcoming 2018 season but was banned for 20 months by Asian Football Confederation for failing a doping test while participating in the AFC U-23 Championship in China.

=== Petaling Jaya City ===
In January 2020, Syihan returned from suspension and signed for Petaling Jaya City due to a lack playing time because of the in-form current goalkeeper, Amsyar Harmizi, he left the club for another stint at Negeri Sembilan.

=== Return to Negeri Sembilan ===
In February 2022, Syihan played as starting goalkeeper for Negeri Sembilan in a pre-season cup match against Kuala Lumpur City and won the Federal Territory Minister Cup. He made his official second debut for Negeri Sembilan against Sabah in 2022 Malaysia Super League on 4 March 2022 in which Negeri Sembilan won 1–0 which also saw him saving a penalty taken by Neto Pessoa.

=== Johor Darul Ta'zim ===
In December 2022, Syihan signed for Johor Darul Ta'zim for the 2023 Malaysia Super League season which saw him playing 24 league matches and keeping a total of 19 clean sheets. He also remarkably conceded 7 goals in the entire league season.

Syihan changed his jersey number from the number 33 to the number 16 ahead of the 2024–25 season.

== International career ==
Syihan made an unofficial appearance for Malaysia at the age of 17 years 1 month 4 days in a charity match (non FIFA 'A' international) against Palestine after replacing Norazlan Razali. In that match, he saved a penalty.

He received his first call-up for the Malaysia U22 team and made his first start against Bahrain U22, with the match ending in a 0–0 draw. In 2017, he was the first-choice goalkeeper in the Dubai Cup Football Tournament. In 2018, he was the third goalkeeper for the national under 23 team in the 2018 AFC U-23 Championship.

Syihan made his official senior team debut on 16 April 2022 during the 2023 AFC Asian Cup qualification final fixture against Bangladesh. He was also a member of the nation's squads at the 2022 AFF Championship and the 2023 AFC Asian Cup in Qatar.

== Career statistics ==
=== Club ===
As of 12 April 2025

Appearances and goals by club, season and competition
Club	Season	League			Cup (Note: Appearances in Malaysia FA Cup)		League Cup (Note: Appearances in Malaysia Cup)		Asia (Note: Appearances in AFC Cup and AFC Champions League Elite)		Total	
Club	Season	Division	Apps	Goals	Apps	Goals	Apps	Goals	Apps	Goals	Apps	Goals
Kelantan	2016	Malaysia Super League	0	0	0	0	1	0	0	0	1	0
Kelantan	2017	Malaysia Super League	0	0	0	0	0	0	0	0	0	0
Kelantan	Total		0	0	0	0	1	0	0	0	1	0
Negeri Sembilan	2018	Malaysia Super League	2	0	0	0	0	0	0	0	2	0
Petaling Jaya City	2020	Malaysia Super League	4	0	0	0	0	0	0	0	4	0
Petaling Jaya City	2021	Malaysia Super League	4	0	0	0	0	0	0	0	4	0
Petaling Jaya City	Total		8	0	0	0	0	0	0	0	8	0
Negeri Sembilan	2022	Malaysia Super League	22	0	4	0	1	0	0	0	27	0
Johor Darul Ta'zim	2023	Malaysia Super League	24	0	2	0	2	0	4	0	32	0
Johor Darul Ta'zim	2024–25	Malaysia Super League	21	0	5	0	4	0	0	0	30	0
Johor Darul Ta'zim	2025–26	Malaysia Super League	0	0	0	0	0	0	0	0	0	0
Johor Darul Ta'zim	Total		45	0	7	0	6	0	4	0	62	0
Career total			77	0	11	0	8	0	4	0	100	0

=== International ===
As of 6 October 2026

Appearances and goals by national team and year
National team	Year	Apps	Goals
Malaysia	2022	6	0
Malaysia	2023	12	0
Malaysia	2024	10	0
Malaysia	2025	8	0
Malaysia	2026	3	0
Total		39	0

== Honours ==
=== Club ===
Johor Darul Ta'zim

- Malaysia Super League: 2023, 2024–25
- Malaysia FA Cup: 2023, 2024
- Malaysia Cup: 2023, 2024–25
- Malaysia Charity Shield: 2023, 2024, 2025

=== International ===
Malaysia

- King's Cup runner-up: 2022
- Merdeka Tournament: 2024

=== Individual ===
- FAM Football Awards – Best Goalkeeper: 2022, 2023, 2024–25
- Malaysia Super League Team of the Season: 2022, 2023, 2024–25
