= Manuel Hidalgo (footballer) =

Malaysian footballer (born 1999)

Personal information
- Full name: Manuel Federico Hidalgo Gasparini
- Date of birth: 3 May 1999 (age 27)
- Place of birth: Olivos, Argentina
- Height: 1.64 m (5 ft 5 in)
- Position: Winger

Team information
- Current team: Johor Darul Ta'zim
- Number: 88

Youth career
- 2014–2017: Ferro Carril Oeste
- 2017: Benfica

Senior career*
Years	Team	Apps	(Gls)
2017–2020	Triestina	29	(0)
2020–2021	Sheffield Wednesday U21	0	(0)
2021–2023	Sri Pahang	30	(9)
2023–2024	Kedah Darul Aman	24	(3)
2024–	Johor Darul Ta'zim	18	(8)
2024–2025	→ Sri Pahang (loan)	18	(3)
2025	→ Kuala Lumpur City (loan)	2	(1)

International career^{‡}
2026–	Malaysia	4	(0)
Medal record
Men's football
Representing Malaysia
FIFA ASEAN Cup
Third place	2026 Indonesia	Team
- * Club domestic league appearances and goals as of 26 August 2026 ‡ National team caps and goals as of 6 October 2026

Manuel Federico Hidalgo Gasparini (born 3 May 1999) is a professional footballer who plays as a winger for Malaysia Super League club Johor Darul Ta'zim. Born in Argentina, he represents the Malaysia national team.

== Club career ==
=== Ferro Carril Oeste ===
At the age of 15, Hidalgo trained with the first team of Argentine club Ferro Carril Oeste in July 2014.

=== Benfica ===
In March 2017, Hidalgo signed for Benfica U19, the most successful club in Portugal, after trialing with English Premier League side Tottenham Hotspur.

=== Triestina ===
On 31 July 2017, Hidalgo signed for Serie C club Triestina, which plays in the Italian third division. He made his debut for the club on 10 August 2017, coming on as a substitute in a 5–1 win against Ravenna.

=== Sheffield Wednesday ===
On 15 January 2020, Hidalgo signed for English EFL Championship team Sheffield Wednesday U21 on an 18-month contract. However, he terminated his contract with six months remaining, citing the death of Argentina international Diego Maradona as one of the reasons behind the decision.

=== Sri Pahang ===
On 4 May 2021, Hidalgo moved to Southeast Asia to joined Malaysian Super League club Sri Pahang. On 5 May 2021 he scored his first goal on his debut for the club in a 2–2 home match draw against rival Selangor in which he also got an assist in the match putting up a 'Man of the Match' performances.

=== Kedah Darul Aman ===
On 5 January 2023, Hidalgo moved to another Malaysian club, Kedah Darul Aman, which offered him a bigger salary due to his magnificent performances with Sri Pahang during the 2022 season. He made his debut for the club on 25 February 2023 in a league match against Perak. On 26 August 2023, Hidalgo put in a fiery display against Johor Darul Ta'zim in which he recorded a hat-trick of assists in a 3–3 draw against the Malaysian league champions. Hidalgo won the 'Man of the Match' afterwards for notably ending Johor Darul Ta'zim's winning streak of dominance in the league.

=== Johor Darul Ta'zim ===
On 11 March 2024, Hidalgo was rewarded with a move to the Malaysian champions Johor Darul Ta'zim. However, he was immediately loaned out to former club Sri Pahang.

==== Sri Pahang (loan) ====
On 11 March 2024, Hidalgo returned to Sri Pahang on loan ahead of the 2024–25 Malaysia Super League season. During the second leg of the 2024–25 Malaysia Cup quarter-final on 22 December, Hidalgo scored his first career hat-trick against Perak in a 3–3 draw which saw Sri Pahang advance to the semi-final with a 4–3 aggregate.

==== Kuala Lumpur City (loan) ====
After a successful loan move to Sri Pahang, on 2 July 2025, Hidalgo signed with Kuala Lumpur City on loan from Johor Darul Ta'zim.

== International career ==
On 17 September 2026, Hidalgo was cleared by FIFA to represent Malaysia as a naturalized player after living in the country for more than five years. He was called up for the national team on the same day in preparation for the 2026 FIFA ASEAN Cup. He made his international debut for the Malaysia national team against Bangladesh on 25 September 2026 at the Gelora Bung Karno Stadium.

== Honours ==
Johor Darul Ta'zim

- Malaysia Super League: 2025–26
- Malaysia Cup: 2026
- Malaysia FA Cup: 2025
