= Fergus Tierney =

Malaysian footballer (born 2003)

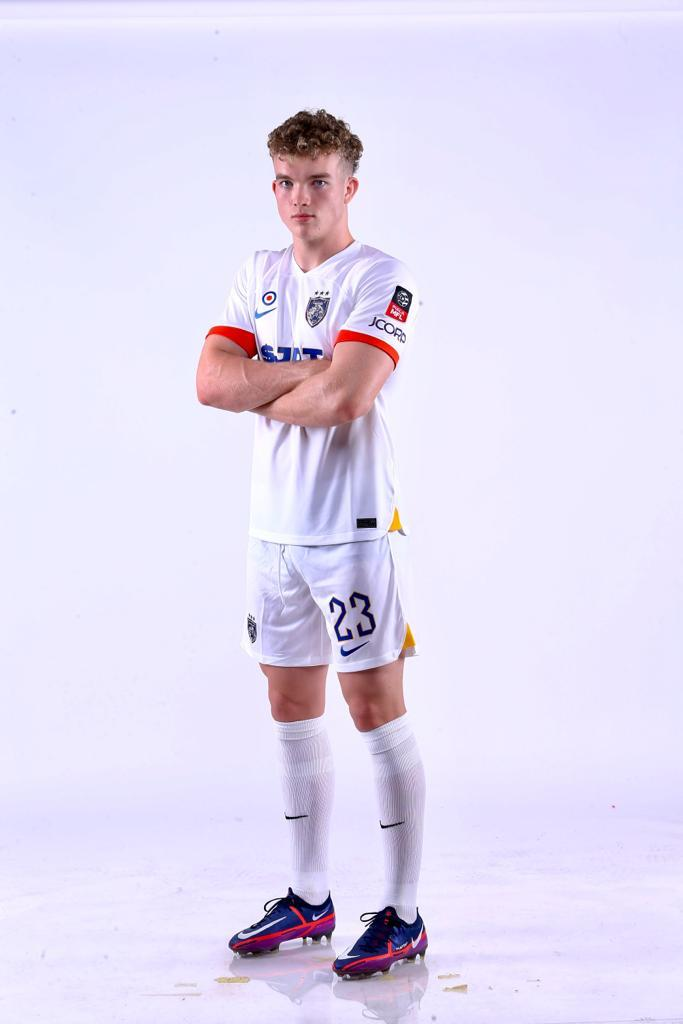
- Tierney with Johor Darul Ta'zim II in 2023

Personal information
- Date of birth: 19 March 2003 (age 23)
- Place of birth: Glasgow, Scotland
- Height: 1.86 m (6 ft 1 in)
- Position: Forward

Team information
- Current team: Omonia 29M
- Number: 11

Youth career
- 2017–2021: Soccer Experience FC
- 2022: Johor Darul Ta'zim III

Senior career*
Years	Team	Apps	(Gls)
2023–2026	Johor Darul Ta'zim II	17	(0)
2024	→ Chonburi (loan)	12	(1)
2025	→ Nakhon Pathom United (loan)	11	(3)
2025–2026	→ Sabah (loan)	22	(6)
2026–	Omonia 29M	5	(2)

International career^{‡}
2023–	Malaysia U23	16	(7)
2024–	Malaysia	11	(2)
Medal record
Men's football
Representing Malaysia
FIFA ASEAN Cup
Third place	2026 Indonesia	Team
Merlion Cup
Winner	2023	Team
- * Club domestic league appearances and goals as of 13 October 2026 ‡ National team caps and goals as of 14 November 2026

Fergus Tierney (born 19 March 2003) is a professional footballer who plays as a forward for Cypriot First Division club PAC Omonia 29M. Born in Scotland, he plays for the Malaysia national team.

== Early years ==
Tierney was born in Glasgow in 2003, and was raised in Penang, Malaysia since his childhood. He is a naturalised player and holds a Malaysian passport.

== Club career ==
=== Youth ===
Tierney started his youth career in Malaysia with Soccer Experience FC, and went on many international football trips where he would play against players from professional football academies.

In his playing days with Soccer Experience FC, he would play in Europe against academy teams like Atlético Madrid youth teams, Osasuna Cantera, Levante Academy, Tenerife academy, Rangers B Team and Academy and youth teams in Southeast Asia against teams like Barcelona's Asian academies, Penang, JSSL Singapore and other regional clubs.

Over the years of travelling from Malaysia to play internationally and gain exposure and experience Tierney was invited to train with clubs like, Sunderland, Leicester City, Dundee, Goa, St Johnstone and many more.

=== Johor Darul Ta'zim II ===
After the COVID-19 pandemic lockdown was eased, Tierney who was 18 years old at that time, was invited to train with the Penang first team. He was also invited to train with Johor Darul Ta'zim and in early 2022, signed a professional contract with the Malaysia Super League giants where he was coached by former Boca Juniors player Mariano Echeverría. He was part of the squad that won the 2022 Malaysia Premier League title.

=== Chonburi (Loan) ===
On 26 July 2024, Tierney joined Thai League 2 side Chonburi on a season loan. On 9 August, 18 seconds into his debut, he scored his first goal, which is also the club's first league goal of the season in a 4–0 win against Suphanburi. On 9 December, Tierney's loan contract was terminated alongside Charlie Clough as the club decided on a change of strategy to prepare for the second half of the season.

=== Nakhon Pathom (Loan) ===
On 5 January 2025, Tierney joined Thai League 1 club Nakhon Pathom United on loan for the remainder of the 2024–25 season.

On 11 January 2025, he made his club debut by coming off the bench in a 0–3 loss to Nakhon Ratchasima, replacing Sunchai Chaolaokhwan in the 66th minute.

=== Sabah ===
In June 2025, Tierney joined Sabah in the 2025–26 Malaysia Super League. Tierney made 2 appearances and scored 1 goal against Bunga Raya in the 2025 Malaysia FA Cup.

=== PAC Omonia 29M ===
In June 2026, Tierney joined Cypriot First Division club PAC Omonia 29M, thus becoming the first Malaysian footballer to play in Cyprus.

== International career ==
Being born in Scotland and raised in Malaysia since childhood, Tierney was eligible to play for either Scotland or Malaysia. He would eventually opt to represent Malaysia.

=== Youth ===
At only 19 years old, Tierney was called up to the Malaysia U23 squad in February 2023 and again called up in March 2023 for the Malaysian team that went on to win the Merlion Cup for the first time that was held in Singapore.

In April 2023 Tierney was selected again to the Malaysia U23 squad for the 2023 Southeast Asian Games in Phnom Penh, Cambodia.

Tierney was again selected in August 2023 for the AFF U-23 Championship held in Thailand where he scored crucial goals including a double against Indonesia U23 to help his Malaysia team win 2–1 and he also helped the team reach the 3rd & 4th Playoff.

In September 2023, Tierney was selected again for the 2024 AFC U-23 Asian Cup qualification held in Thailand and helped the Malaysia team advance from the AFC regional qualifiers and reach the 2024 AFC U-23 Asian Cup tournament to be held in Qatar in April 2024.

In April 2024, Tierney was selected for the 2024 AFC U-23 Asian Cup tournament.

=== Senior ===
Tierney was selected for the training camp ahead of the international friendlies against Laos and India in November 2024, replacing the injured Romel Morales. He made his senior debut for Malaysia on 14 November 2024 against Laos at the PAT Stadium.

Tierney scored his first goal for the senior team on 8 December 2024 in the 2024 ASEAN Championship group stage match against Cambodia at the Phnom Penh Olympic Stadium, helping to equalise the score at 2–2.

== Personal life ==
Tierney is the son Martin Tierney, who formerly played for PDRM, Penang, and Geylang International, an academy coach, and pundit for Astro SuperSport. His mother, Sharon, was an elite athlete who has represented Scottish Athletics national team. His sisters, Murron and Grear, are presently competitive footballers with Soccer Experience FC senior girls/ladies team. Both Murron and Grear are licensed Asian Football Confederation youth football coaches.

He is fluent in English and Malay.

== Career statistics ==
=== International ===
As of 5 October 2026

Appearances and goals by national team and year
National team	Year	Apps	Goals
Malaysia	2024	6	1
Malaysia	2026	4	1
Total		10	2

International goals

No.	Date	Venue	Opponent	Score	Result	Competition
1.	8 December 2024	Phnom Penh Olympic Stadium, Phnom Penh, Cambodia	Cambodia	2–2	2–2	2024 ASEAN Championship
2.	5 October 2026	Gelora Bung Karno Stadium, Jakarta, Indonesia	Vietnam	1–0	1–0	2026 FIFA ASEAN Cup

== Honours ==
JDT II

- Malaysia Premier League: 2022
- MFL Cup runner-up: 2023

Chonburi

- Thai League 2: 2024–25

Malaysia U22

- Merlion Cup: 2023
