= Óscar Arribas =

Spanish footballer

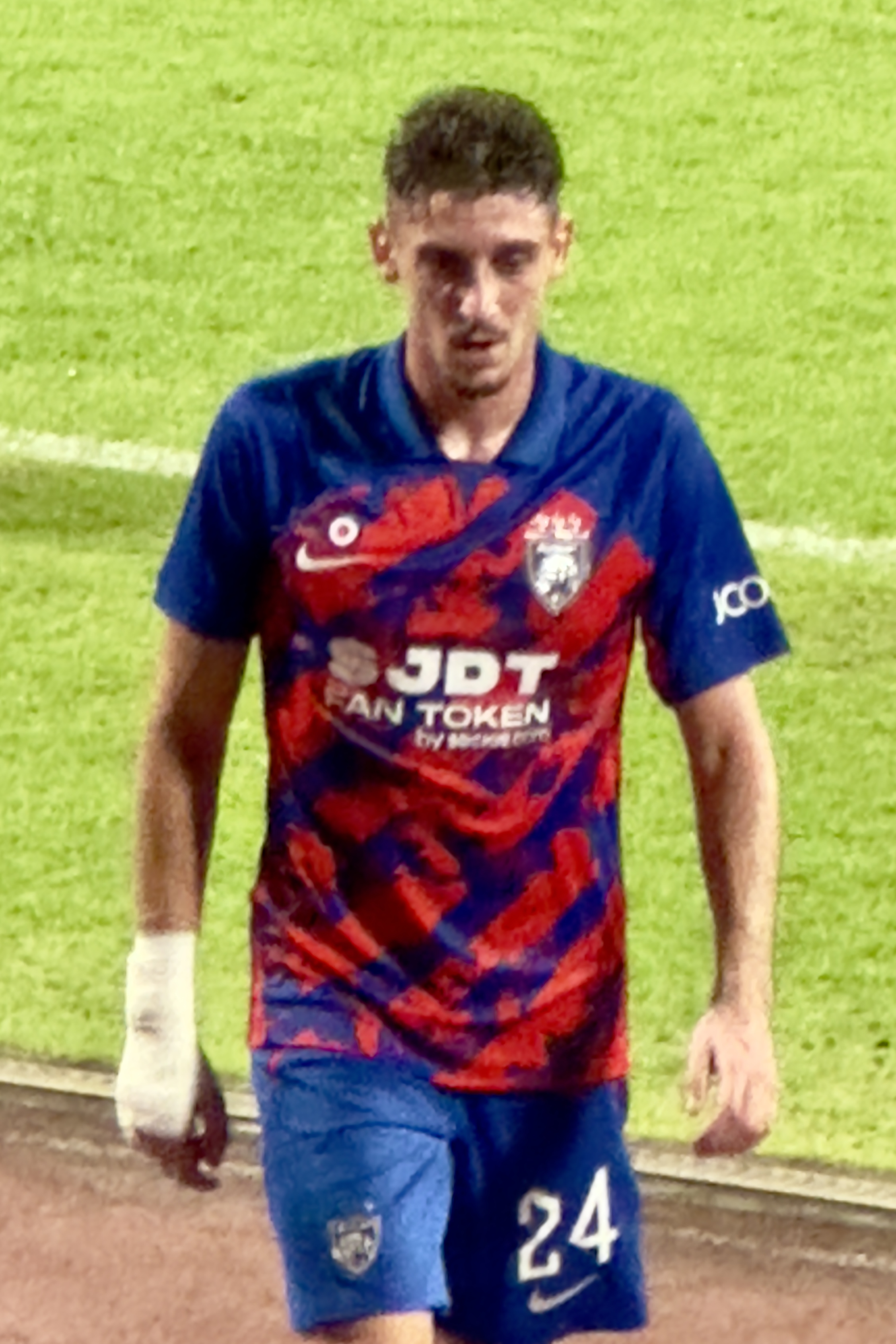
- Arribas with Johor Darul Ta'zim in 2024

Personal information
- Full name: Óscar Arribas Pasero
- Date of birth: 22 October 1998 (age 28)
- Place of birth: Parla, Spain
- Height: 1.83 m (6 ft 0 in)
- Position: Winger

Team information
- Current team: Johor Darul Ta'zim
- Number: 24

Youth career
- 2012–2014: Lugo Fuenlabrada
- 2014–2017: Alcorcón

Senior career*
Years	Team	Apps	(Gls)
2016–2022	Alcorcón	110	(10)
2017–2019	Alcorcón B	72	(7)
2022	Cartagena	10	(1)
2023–	Johor Darul Ta'zim	53	(12)
- * Club domestic league appearances and goals as of 27 February 2026

Óscar Arribas Pasero (born 22 October 1998) is a Spanish professional footballer who plays as a winger for Malaysia Super League club Johor Darul Ta'zim.

== Club career ==
Arribas was born in Parla, Community of Madrid, and joined AD Alcorcón's youth setup in 2014 from CDE Lugo Fuenlabrada. He made his first team debut on 29 November 2016 before even appearing with the reserves, coming on as a second half substitute for Samu in a 1–1 home draw against RCD Espanyol for the season's Copa del Rey.

Arribas made his debut with the B-side on 15 January 2017, in a 0–3 Tercera División home loss against Getafe CF B. His Segunda División debut came on 4 March, again from the bench in a 0–0 home draw against Sevilla Atlético.

On 16 August 2019, Arribas signed his first professional contract through 2021. He scored his first goal with the main squad on 12 October, netting the opener in a 3–1 away defeat of Sporting de Gijón.

=== Cartagena ===
On 1 July 2022, after Alkor's relegation, Arribas signed a one-year contract with FC Cartagena in the second division. On 13 December, however, he terminated his link with the club.

=== Johor Darul Ta'zim ===
On 8 January 2023, Arribas moved to Malaysia to join Malaysia Super League champions Johor Darul Ta'zim and signed with the club under the ASEAN player quota with a Philippines passport.

== International career ==
In November 2022, it was reported that Arribas received a call-up from the Philippines for a training camp, in preparation for the 2022 AFF Championship.

== Honours ==
=== Club ===
Johor Darul Ta'zim

- Malaysia Super League: 2023, 2024–25
- Malaysia FA Cup: 2023, 2024
- Malaysia Cup: 2023, 2024–25
- Piala Sumbangsih: 2023, 2024, 2025

Individual

- ASEAN Club Championship: Allstar XI 2025–26
