= 2026–27 Malaysia Super League =

Malaysian football season

Malaysia Super League
- Season: 2026–27
- Matches: 41
- Goals: 138 (3.37 per match)
- Top goalscorer: 9 goals Chrigor
- Biggest home win: Johor Darul Ta'zim 9–0 Kelantan Red Warrior (26 Aug 2026)
- Biggest away win: Kuala Lumpur City 0–6 Kuching City (26 Aug 2026)
- Highest scoring: 9 goals Johor Darul Ta'zim 9–0 Kelantan Red Warrior (26 Aug 2026)
- Longest winning run: Johor Darul Ta'zim (6 matches)
- Longest unbeaten run: Johor Darul Ta'zim (6 matches)
- Longest winless run: Kelantan Red Warrior (6 matches)
- Longest losing run: Kelantan Red Warrior (6 matches)
- All statistics correct as of 22 Nov 2026.

The 2026–27 Malaysia Super League(also known as the 2026–27 Unifi Liga Super for sponsorship reasons) (Malay: Liga Super Malaysia 2026–27) will be the 23rd season of the Malaysia Super League, the top-tier professional football league in Malaysia since its establishment in 2004, and the 45th season of the top-flight Malaysian football overall.

Johor Darul Ta'zim are the defending champions, having won their record 12th Super League title in the previous season.

== Teams ==
=== Changes from the previous season ===
A total of twelve teams are confirmed to contest the league, including eleven from the 2025–26 season, one promoted from the A1 Semi-Pro League. Kelantan Red Warrior will play in the Super League for the first time in their history. Kelantan The Real Warriors and PDRM were ejected from Super League due to failure to obtain a national license. Immigration FC rebranded to Star City for this season.

▲ Promoted from A1 Semi-Pro League	▼ Ejected from Super League
Kelantan Red Warrior	The Real Warriors; PDRM

== Stadiums and locations ==
Team	Location	Stadium	Capacity
DPMM	Bandar Seri Begawan	Hassanal Bolkiah National Stadium	28,000
Johor Darul Ta'zim	Iskandar Puteri	Sultan Ibrahim Stadium	40,000
Kelantan Red Warrior	Kota Bharu	Sultan Muhammad IV Stadium	30,000
Kuala Lumpur City	Cheras	Kuala Lumpur Stadium	18,000
Kuching City	Kuching	Taha Ariffin Stadium	17,584
Melaka	Krubong	Hang Jebat Stadium	40,000
Negeri Sembilan	Seremban	Tuanku Abdul Rahman Stadium	30.412
Penang	George Town, Penang	City Stadium	20,000
Sabah	Kota Kinabalu	Likas Stadium	35,000
Selangor	Petaling Jaya	MBPJ Stadium	10,661
Star City	Kangar	Tuanku Syed Putra Stadium	20,000
Terengganu	Kuala Nerus	Sultan Mizan Zainal Abidin Stadium	50,000

Locations of teams in the 2026–27 Malaysia Super League

== Personnel and kits ==
Team	Head coach	Captain	Kit manufacturer	Kit sponsors	
Team	Head coach	Captain	Kit manufacturer	Main	Other(s)
DPMM	(Scotland) Jamie McAllister	(Brunei) Azwan Ali Rahman	(Germany) Puma	Royal Brunei Airlines	List: Front: DST; Back: None; Sleeves: None; Shorts: None
Johor Darul Ta'zim	(Spain) Xisco Muñoz	(Malaysia) Arif Aiman	(United States) Nike	JMYR Stablecoin	List: Front: None; Back: Toyota; Sleeves: JCORP; Shorts: None
Kelantan Red Warrior	(Malaysia) Irfan Bakti Abu Salim	(Malaysia) Arham Khussyairi	(Malaysia) DUO Sports	Nasken Coffee	List: Front: Adriana Gold, Rohm Semiconductor, Elrah Exclusive; Back: Elrah Exclusive, Factory Mobile, Raja Perfume, Sihaté, SifuBad.AI; Sleeves: Kemudi Timur, Nid Golok; Shorts: None
Kuala Lumpur City	(Malaysia) Dollah Salleh	(Malaysia) Paulo Josué	(Malaysia) StarSports	DBKL	List: Front: None; Back: None; Sleeves: None; Shorts: None
Kuching City	(Singapore) Aidil Sharin Sahak	(Nigeria) James Okwuosa	(Malaysia) StarSports	AirBorneo	List: Front: LSC, Affin Bank; Back: Press Metal; Sleeves: TVS; Shorts: None
Melaka	(Malaysia) E. Elavarasan	(Malaysia) Khairul Fahmi Che Mat	(Germany) Puma	Kemalak Group	List: Front: Xperts.my, ABCS Sdn Bhd, Qalb Zahara; Back: Conextone Energy; Sleeves: T&Y, W Petroleum Sdn Bhd; Shorts: None
Negeri Sembilan	(Spain) Daniel Giménez	(Malaysia) Khuzaimi Piee	(Thailand) Warrix	Matrix Concept	List: Front: NR, MBI Negeri Sembilan; Back: SAINS, IRC; Sleeves: NS Corporation, Gemencheh Granite Sdn Bhd; Shorts: None
Penang	(Malaysia) Wan Rohaimi	(Argentina) Stefano Brundo	(Thailand) FBT	Penang2030	List: Front: SA Mutiara Deco, Tobaki; Back: Untuk Sukan Kita!; Sleeves: PDC, Mat Saleh Barber; Shorts: None
Sabah	(Spain) Juan Torres	(Malaysia) Dominic Tan	(Malaysia) Carino	Sawit Kinabalu	List: Front: Sabah Softwoods Berhad, Cement Industries (Sabah) Sdn Bhd, Emas Sri Semantan; Back: Sportmart; Sleeves: Sabah Maju Jaya; Shorts: None
Selangor	(South Korea) Kim Pan-gon	(Malaysia) Faisal Halim	(Germany) Adidas	PKNS	List: Front: Grantt Lubricants, SANI (H) / AKE (A), MBI Selangor; Back: Provident Fiduciaries Berhad, Daikin, KUSEL; Sleeves: Sime Darby Property (H) / MBPJ (A), KDEB Services (H) / Hyundai (A); Shorts: None
Star City	(Australia) Mehmet Duraković	(Malaysia) Rizal Ghazali	(Malaysia) StarSports	AirAsia	List: Front: None; Back: FIVE Petroleum; Sleeves: None; Shorts: None
Terengganu	(Malaysia) Nafuzi Zain	(Malaysia) Shahrul Nizam	(Malaysia) Trivet	Terengganu Incorporated	List: Front: Klinik Wildan, EPIC; Back: Ladang Rakyat, In Saff Travel & Tours, MS Citajaya; Sleeves: TDM, SATU; Shorts: None

== Foreign players ==
For the 2026–27 Malaysia Super League season, clubs can register a maximum of 15 foreign players, while the matchday rules allow up to 6 foreign players on the field at any one time. A maximum of 6 foreign players are permitted on the field simultaneously. Distributed as 4 open slots, 1 Asian (AFC) slot, and 1 ASEAN slot. Up to 3 additional foreign players are allowed on the substitutes' bench

- Players name in **bold** indicates the player is registered during the mid-season transfer window.
- This list only includes those registered to play in the league, not included in the AFC Competition.

Note: Flags indicate national team as defined under FIFA eligibility rules.

Club	Players								Former players
Brunei DPMM	Player 1	Player 2	Player 3	Player 4	Player 5	Player 6	Player 7	Player 8	Former players
Brunei DPMM	(Brazil) Dalberto	(Finland) Felipe Aspegren	(Ghana) Ebenezer Abban	(Guatemala) Óscar Santis	(Portugal) Miguel Oliveira	(Scotland) Clark Robertson	—N/a	—N/a	No
Brunei DPMM	Player 9	Player 10	Player 11	Player 12	AFC	ASEAN	ASEAN	—	No
Brunei DPMM	—N/a	—N/a	—N/a	—N/a	(Australia) Jordan Murray	(Indonesia) Muhammad Toha	(Philippines) Amani Aguinaldo	—	No
Brunei DPMM	Registered additional player: No								No
Johor Darul Ta'zim	Player 1	Player 2	Player 3	Player 4	Player 5	Player 6	Player 7	Player 8	
Johor Darul Ta'zim	(Argentina) Jonathan Silva	(Azerbaijan) Eddy Pascual	(Brazil) Jairo	(Brazil) Marcos Guilherme	(Brazil) Yago	(Colombia) Kevin Medina	(Equatorial Guinea) Carlos Akapo	(Portugal) Nené	No
Johor Darul Ta'zim	Player 9	Player 10	Player 11	Player 12	AFC	ASEAN	ASEAN	—	No
Johor Darul Ta'zim	(Slovenia) Dejan Petrovič	(Spain) Ager Aketxe	(Spain) Matías Nahuel	(Spain) Stoichkov	(Iran) Shahab Zahedi	(Philippines) Antonio Glauder	(Philippines) Óscar Arribas	—	No
Johor Darul Ta'zim	Registered additional player: (Brazil) Dani Bolt (Note: Registered in Super League & A1 Semi-Pro League), (France) Enzo Lombardo, (Spain) Andoni Zubiaurre, (Spain) Celso Bermejo, (Spain) Jon Yeabsera, (Spain) Miquel Cuesta								No
Kelantan Red Warrior	Player 1	Player 2	Player 3	Player 4	Player 5	Player 6	Player 7	Player 8	
Kelantan Red Warrior	(Cameroon) Emmanuel Mbarga	(Nigeria) Philip Dandada Musa	—N/a	—N/a	—N/a	—N/a	—N/a	—N/a	No
Kelantan Red Warrior	Player 9	Player 10	Player 11	Player 12	AFC	ASEAN	ASEAN	—	No
Kelantan Red Warrior	—N/a	—N/a	—N/a	—N/a	—N/a	—N/a	—N/a	—	No
Kelantan Red Warrior	Registered additional player: No								No
Kuala Lumpur City	Player 1	Player 2	Player 3	Player 4	Player 5	Player 6	Player 7	Player 8	
Kuala Lumpur City	(Afghanistan) Fareed Sadat	(Australia) Giancarlo Gallifuoco	(Germany) Reagy Ofosu	(Ghana) Joseph Adjei	(Ukraine) Dmytro Lytvyn	—N/a	—N/a	—N/a	No
Kuala Lumpur City	Player 9	Player 10	Player 11	Player 12	AFC	ASEAN	ASEAN	—	No
Kuala Lumpur City	—N/a	—N/a	—N/a	—N/a	(Australia) James Donachie	(Philippines) Quincy Kammeraad	—N/a	—	No
Kuala Lumpur City	Registered additional player: No								No
Kuching City	Player 1	Player 2	Player 3	Player 4	Player 5	Player 6	Player 7	Player 8	
Kuching City	(Australia) Dylan Wenzel-Halls	(Bosnia and Herzegovina) Ajdin Mujagić	(Brazil) Gabriel Peres	(Cameroon) Jerome Mpacko Etame	(Cameroon) Ronald Ngah	(Japan) Kaishu Yamazaki	(Japan) Yuki Tanigawa	(Namibia) Petrus Shitembi	No
Kuching City	Player 9	Player 10	Player 11	Player 12	AFC	ASEAN	ASEAN	—	No
Kuching City	(Nigeria) James Okwuosa	—N/a	—N/a	—N/a	(Jordan) Ahmad Israiwah	(Timor-Leste) João Pedro	—N/a	—	No
Kuching City	Registered additional player: No								No
Melaka	Player 1	Player 2	Player 3	Player 4	Player 5	Player 6	Player 7	Player 8	
Melaka	(Bosnia and Herzegovina) Dino Kalesic	(Brazil) Christian André	(Cambodia) Abdel Kader Coulibaly	(France) Ronny Song	(Iran) Ali Nouri	(Ivory Coast) Noel Agbre	(Japan) Shuto Asano	(Liberia) Kpah Sherman	No
Melaka	Player 9	Player 10	Player 11	Player 12	AFC	ASEAN	ASEAN	—	No
Melaka	(Montenegro) Argzim Redžović	(Nigeria) Michael Onyekachi Ozor	(South Korea) Do Dong-hyun	(South Korea) Kim Shin-hoo	(South Korea) Park Kwang-il	(Myanmar) Hein Htet Aung	(Philippines) Simen Lyngbø	—	No
Melaka	Registered additional player: No								No
Negeri Sembilan	Player 1	Player 2	Player 3	Player 4	Player 5	Player 6	Player 7	Player 8	
Negeri Sembilan	(Bosnia and Herzegovina) Jovan Motika	(The Gambia) Anuar Ceesay	(Japan) Kei Oshiro	(Japan) Mio Tsuneyasu	(Japan) Takumi Sasaki	(Japan) Yūichi Hirano	(Japan) Yusuke Minagawa	(Mongolia) Filip Chinzorig	No
Negeri Sembilan	Player 9	Player 10	Player 11	Player 12	AFC	ASEAN	ASEAN	—	No
Negeri Sembilan	—N/a	—N/a	—N/a	—N/a	(South Korea) Park Yi-young	(Myanmar) Wai Linn Aung	(Singapore) Ryaan Sanizal	—	No
Negeri Sembilan	Registered additional player: No								No
Penang	Player 1	Player 2	Player 3	Player 4	Player 5	Player 6	Player 7	Player 8	
Penang	(Argentina) Stefano Brundo	(France) Enzo Célestine	(Nigeria) Faith Friday Obilor	(Serbia) Dejan Tumbas	(Uzbekistan) Bakhtiyor Kosimov	—N/a	—N/a	—N/a	No
Penang	Player 9	Player 10	Player 11	Player 12	AFC	ASEAN	ASEAN	—	No
Penang	—N/a	—N/a	—N/a	—N/a	(Uzbekistan) Murodbek Bobojonov	(Philippines) Jarvey Gayoso	(Philippines) OJ Porteria	—	No
Penang	Registered additional player: No								No
Sabah	Player 1	Player 2	Player 3	Player 4	Player 5	Player 6	Player 7	Player 8	
Sabah	(Argentina) Gonzalo Di Renzo	(Argentina) Juan Flere	(Japan) Sho Yamamoto	(New Zealand) Dane Ingham	(Spain) Cadete	(Spain) Cifu	(Spain) José Ángel	—N/a	No
Sabah	Player 9	Player 10	Player 11	Player 12	AFC	ASEAN	ASEAN	—	No
Sabah	—N/a	—N/a	—N/a	—N/a	(South Korea) Park Jung-bin	(Philippines) Oskari Kekkonen	—N/a	—	No
Sabah	Registered additional player: No								No
Selangor	Player 1	Player 2	Player 3	Player 4	Player 5	Player 6	Player 7	Player 8	
Selangor	(Brazil) Chrigor	(Brazil) Pernambuco	(France) Hugo Boumous	(Ghana) Alex Agyarkwa	(Ghana) Richmond Ankrah	(Kosovo) Arbenit Xhemajli	(Netherlands) Kay Tejan	(Venezuela) Eduardo Sosa	No
Selangor	Player 9	Player 10	Player 11	Player 12	AFC	ASEAN	ASEAN	—	No
Selangor	—N/a	—N/a	—N/a	—N/a	(Australia) Peter Makrillos	(Philippines) Jefferson Tabinas	(Singapore) Safuwan Baharudin	—	No
Selangor	Registered additional player: No								No
Star City	Player 1	Player 2	Player 3	Player 4	Player 5	Player 6	Player 7	Player 8	
Star City	(Brazil) Douglas Oliveira	(Brazil) Pedro Santos Filho	(Brazil) Pedro Henrique	(Brazil) Rafael Vitor	(Brazil) Ramon Machado	—N/a	—N/a	—N/a	No
Star City	Player 9	Player 10	Player 11	Player 12	AFC	ASEAN	ASEAN	—	No
Star City	—N/a	—N/a	—N/a	—N/a	(Bahrain) Moses Atede	(Philippines) Noah Leddel	(Singapore) Zulfahmi Arifin	—	No
Star City	Registered additional player: No								No
Terengganu	Player 1	Player 2	Player 3	Player 4	Player 5	Player 6	Player 7	Player 8	
Terengganu	(Brazil) Mateusinho	(Burundi) Elvis Kamsoba	(Cameroon) Ngweni Ndassi	(Curaçao) Gervane Kastaneer	(Senegal) Papé Diakité	(Spain) Víctor Ruiz	—N/a	—N/a	No
Terengganu	Player 9	Player 10	Player 11	Player 12	AFC	ASEAN	ASEAN	—	No
Terengganu	—N/a	—N/a	—N/a	—N/a	(Bahrain) Habib Haroon	(Philippines) Manny Ott	—N/a	—	No
Terengganu	Registered additional player: No								No

== League table ==
Pos	Team	Pld	W	D	L	GF	GA	GD	Pts	Qualification or relegation
1	Johor Darul Ta'zim	6	6	0	0	28	0	+28	18	Qualification for the AFC Champions League Elite league stage
2	Selangor	6	6	0	0	17	4	+13	18	Qualification for the AFC Champions League Two group stage
3	Kuching City	7	5	0	2	19	7	+12	15	
4	DPMM (Note: DPMM cannot qualify for Asian Football Confederation competitions as they are based in Brunei.)	7	5	0	2	11	9	+2	15	
5	Sabah	7	3	1	3	10	8	+2	10	
6	Melaka	7	3	1	3	12	14	−2	10	
7	Penang	7	2	1	4	6	10	−4	7	
8	Star City	7	1	3	3	11	18	−7	6	
9	Kuala Lumpur City (Note: Negeri Sembilan were awarded a 3–0 win and three points after KL City were found to have failed to register enough players.)	7	2	0	5	6	17	−11	6	
10	Negeri Sembilan	7	1	2	4	8	13	−5	5	
11	Terengganu	7	1	2	4	5	11	−6	5	
12	Kelantan Red Warrior	7	1	0	6	8	30	−22	3	

Updated to match(es) played on 22 November 2026. Source: MFL
Rules for classification: 1) Points; 2) Goal difference; 3) Number of goals scored

== Results ==
Home \ Away	DPM	JDT	KRW	KLC	KUC	MEL	NSE	PEN	SAB	SEL	STA	TER
DPMM	—				3–2		3–1					
Johor Darul Ta'zim	3–0	—	9–0		3–0		3–0				7–0	
Kelantan Red Warrior			—	1–3	0–5				2–1	1–4	2–5	
Kuala Lumpur City	1–0			—	0–6			0–1				
Kuching City					—							
Melaka				3–2	1–2	—	2–1				2–2	
Negeri Sembilan				3–0	0–2		—		1–1		2–2	
Penang	0–1		3–2			1–2		—				
Sabah	1–2				0–2			2–0	—		3–1	2–0
Selangor				3–0		3–2		3–1		—	1–0	
Star City											—	1–1
Terengganu	1–2	0–3				3–0		0–0		0–3		—

Updated to match(es) played on 22 November 2026. Source: MFL
Legend: Blue = home team win; Yellow = draw; Red = away team win.
For upcoming matches, an "a" indicates there is an article about the rivalry between the two participants.

=== Position by round ===
Team ╲ Round	1	2	3	4	5	6	7	8	9	10	11	12	13	14	15	16	17	18	19	20	21	22
DPMM	6	7	9	5	4	4																
Johor Darul Ta'zim	2	1	1	1	1	1																
Kelantan Red Warrior	9	12	12	12	12	12																
Kuala Lumpur City	10	9	5	6	7	7																
Kuching City	11	2	2	2	3	3																
Melaka	12	8	8	10	6	6																
Negeri Sembilan	3	5	6	8	8	8																
Penang	7	10	10	9	11	11																
Sabah	5	4	4	4	5	5																
Selangor	1	3	3	3	2	2																
Star City	8	11	11	11	10	10																
Terengganu	4	6	7	7	9	9																

Leader & Qualification for 2027–28 AFC Champions League Elite
Qualification for 2027–28 AFC Champions League Two

Updated to match(es) played on 1 Nov 2026. Source: MFL

=== Results by match played ===
Team ╲ Round	1	2	3	4	5	6	7	8	9	10	11	12	13	14	15	16	17	18	19	20	21	22
DPMM	W	L	L	W	W	W	W															
Johor Darul Ta'zim	W	W	W	W	W	W																
Kelantan Red Warrior	L	L	L	L	L	L	W															
Kuala Lumpur City	L	W	W	L	L	L	L															
Kuching City	L	W	W	W	L	W	W															
Melaka	L	W	L	L	W	W	D															
Negeri Sembilan	W	L	D	L	D	L	L															
Penang	L	L	D	W	L	L	W															
Sabah	W	W	L	L	D	W	L															
Selangor	W	W	W	W	W	W																
Star City	L	L	D	D	W	L	D															
Terengganu	W	L	D	D	L	L	L															

Updated to match(es) played on 22 Nov 2026. Source: MFL
W = Win; D = Draw; L = Lose; P = Postponed

== Season statistics ==
=== Top goalscorers ===
As of 21 Nov 2026

Rank	Player	Club	Goals
1	(Brazil) Chrigor	Selangor	9
2	(Iran) Shahab Zahedi	Johor Darul Ta'zim	8
3	(Malaysia) Bérgson	Johor Darul Ta'zim	7
3	(Cameroon) Jerome Etame	Kuching City	7
4	(Brazil) Dalberto	DPMM	5
5	(Bosnia and Herzegovina) Ajdin Mujagić	Kuching City	4
5	(Argentina) Gonzalo Di Renzo	Sabah	4
7	(Brazil) Marcos Guilherme	Johor Darul Ta'zim	3
7	(Malaysia) Paulo Josué	Kuala Lumpur City	3
7	(Malaysia) Safawi Rasid	Kuching City	3
7	(Argentina) Stefano Brundo	Penang	3
7	(Malaysia) Azfar Fikri	Star City	3
12	(Australia) Jordan Murray	DPMM FC	2
12	(Spain) Óscar Arribas	Johor Darul Ta'zim	2
12	(Nigeria) Philip Musa	Kelantan Red Warrior	2
12	(Australia) Dylan Wenzel-Halls	Kuching City	2
12	(Brazil) Christian	Melaka	2
12	(South Korea) Do Dong-hyun	Melaka	2
12	(Malaysia) Akhyar Rashid	Negeri Sembilan	2
12	(Malaysia) Faisal Halim	Selangor	2
12	(Curaçao) Gervane Kastaneer	Terengganu	2
12	(Brazil) Víctor Ruiz	Terengganu	2
21	Fourty nine players		1

== See also ==
- 2026 Piala Sumbangsih
- 2026–27 Malaysia A1 Semi-Pro League
- 2026–27 Malaysia A2 Amateur League
- 2026–27 Malaysia A3 Community League
- 2026–27 Malaysia FA Cup
- 2027 Malaysia Cup
- 2027 MFL Challenge Cup
- 2026–27 Piala Presiden
- 2026–27 Piala Belia
