= 2026–27 Selangor F.C. season =

2026–27 season of Malaysian association football club

Selangor
2026–27 season
- Chairman: Tengku Amir Shah
- Manager: Mahfizul Rusydin
- Head coach: Kim Pan-gon
- Stadium: MBPJ Stadium
- Super League: 2nd
- FA Cup: Semi-finals
- Malaysia Cup: Round of 16
- Top goalscorer: League: (9 goals); Chrigor; All: (14 goals); Chrigor
- Highest home attendance: 7,092; FA Cup; Selangor vs Kuching City (23 October 2026)
- Lowest home attendance: 3,170; Super League; Selangor vs Penang (17 October 2026)
- Biggest win: 4–1 vs Kelantan Red Warrior (A), 22 August 2026, Super League; 3–0 vs Terengganu (A), 28 August 2026, Super League; 3–0 vs Kuala Lumpur City (H), 13 September 2026, Super League; 4–1 vs Star City (A), 19 September 2026, FA Cup
- Biggest defeat: 0–2 vs Kuching City (A), 8 November 2026, FA Cup
Home colours	Away colours

The 2026–27 season is Selangor's 21st season in the Super League and their 41st consecutive season in the top flight of Malaysian football. The club also participates in the FA Cup and Malaysia Cup, but not in Asian competitions for the first time since 2024–25 season.

This was the club's first season since 2022 without Fazly Mazlan and Samuel Somerville, who both departed to Penang and DPMM, respectively, and the first season since 2023 without Noor Al-Rawabdeh, who departed to Jordanian Pro League club Al-Faisaly following the expiration of his contract.

Selangor played their official home matches for the entire season at the MBPJ Stadium following Shah Alam Stadium was closed for major renovation and rebuild work.

== Kits ==
- Supplier: Adidas
- Sponsor: PKNS & MBI (front) / KHIND (shoulder)

Home	Away
Goalkeeper 1	Goalkeeper 2

== Review ==
Following the conclusion of the 2025–26 season, Selangor entered the new season aiming to build on the progress achieved during the previous year. Under the leadership of Kim Pan-gon, appointed in January 2026, Selangor began to establish a clearer playing identity and tactical structure, providing optimism ahead of the new season. Despite showing signs of improvement following the appointment of Kim Pan-gon midway through the season, Selangor concluded the 2025–26 league campaign in the third (3rd) place, and failed to secure qualification for Asian club competitions. The club's final league position ended its consecutive appearances on the continental stage spanning all the way from 2024, while deep runs in domestic and regional cup competitions were ultimately not enough to secure silverware. The outcome prompted a period of squad rebuilding and strategic planning ahead of the new season, with the objective of returning to contention for both domestic honours and continental qualification.

With a renewed squad, new signings, and the return of Adidas as the club's official kit partner, the Red Giants entered the 2026–27 season with ambitions of challenging for major honours domestically and making a stronger impact in continental competitions.

== Players ==
=== First team ===
No.	Player	Nat.	Position(s)	Date of birth (age)	Signed	Signed from	Noted
Goalkeepers
20	Azim Al-Amin	(Malaysia)	GK	20 September 2001 (age 25)	2024	Kuala Lumpur City	
31	Sikh Izhan Nazrel	(Malaysia)	GK	23 March 2002 (age 24)	2021	Selangor U-23	
33	Kalamullah Al-Hafiz	(Malaysia)	GK	30 July 1995 (age 31)	2024	Kedah Darul Aman	
Defenders
2	Quentin Cheng	(Malaysia) (Australia)	RB / RWB	20 November 1999 (age 26)	2020	(Australia) Sutherland Sharks	
4	Richmond Ankrah	(Ghana)	CB	22 February 2000 (age 26)	2022	(Ghana) Accra Lions	
5	Arbenit Xhemajli	(Kosovo)	CB	23 April 1998 (age 28)	2026	(Albania) KF Egnatia	
14	Zikri Khalili	(Malaysia)	LB / RB	25 June 2002 (age 24)	2020	Selangor U-23	
16	A. Selvan	(Malaysia)	RB / RWB	5 November 2000 (age 26)	2026	Negeri Sembilan	
21	Safuwan Baharudin (VC)	(Singapore)	CB / DM / CM	22 September 1991 (age 35)	2023	Negeri Sembilan	
40	Jefferson Tabinas	(Philippines)	CB / LB / LM	7 August 1998 (age 28)	2026	(Thailand) Buriram United	
44	Sharul Nazeem	(Malaysia)	CB	16 November 1999 (age 26)	2021	Selangor U-23	
46	Adib Ra'op	(Malaysia)	LB / LM	25 October 1999 (age 27)	2026	Penang	
55	Harith Haiqal	(Malaysia)	CB / DM	22 June 2002 (age 24)	2021	Selangor U-23	
Midfielders
6	Nooa Laine	(Malaysia) (Finland)	AM / CM / DM	22 November 2002 (age 23)	2024	(Finland) SJK Seinäjoki	
8	Peter Makrillos	(Australia)	CM / AM	4 September 1995 (age 31)	2026	(Vietnam) Cong An Ho Chi Minh City	
9	Hugo Boumous	(France)	AM / CM / LM	24 July 1995 (aged 30)	2026	(India) Odisha	
10	Eduardo Sosa	(Venezuela)	AM / CM / RW	20 June 1996 (age 30)	2026	Immigration	
19	Azam Azih	(Malaysia)	CM / DM / AM	3 January 1995 (age 31)	2026	Kelantan The Real Warriors	
24	Alex Agyarkwa	(Ghana)	CM / DM	18 July 2000 (age 26)	2021	(Ghana) Accra Lions	
28	Muhammad Khalil	(Malaysia)	DM	11 April 2005 (age 21)	2024	Selangor U-23	
29	Mukhairi Ajmal	(Malaysia)	CM / LM / LW / AM	7 November 2001 (age 25)	2019	PKNP	
43	Syahir Bashah	(Malaysia)	LM / RM / AM	16 September 2001 (age 25)	2022	Perak	
76	Aliff Izwan	(Malaysia)	CM / AM / CF	10 February 2004 (age 22)	2023	Selangor U-23	
Forwards
7	Faisal Halim (C)	(Malaysia)	LW / RW / LM / RM	7 January 1998 (age 28)	2022	Terengganu	
11	Kay Tejan	(Netherlands)	CF / LW / RW	3 February 1997 (age 29)	2026	(Netherlands) SC Telstar	
91	Chrigor	(Brazil)	CF / LW / RW	13 November 2000 (age 25)	2025	(Thailand) Buriram United	
98	Vitor Pernambuco	(Brazil)	RW / SS / LW	28 April 1998 (age 28)	2026	Unattached	
Out on loan
77	Aliff Haiqal	(Malaysia)	CM / LM / RM	11 July 2000 (age 26)	2020	PKNS	

=== Reserve team ===
No.	Player	Nat.	Position(s)	Date of birth (age)	Signed	Signed from	Noted
Selangor U-23
34	Haykal Danish	(Malaysia)	RW / LW	5 May 2005 (age 21)	2024	Selangor U-23	
37	Pedro Ataíde	(Brazil)	CF / RW / LW	28 June 2005 (age 21)	2026	(Cyprus) APOEL	(Note: On loan.)
—	Moses Raj	(Malaysia)	CB	10 August 2005 (age 21)	2025	Perak	
—	Aiman Hakimi	(Malaysia)	CB / RB	28 January 2005 (age 21)	2024	Selangor U-23	
—	Danish Iskandar	(Malaysia)	CM / AM	24 June 2006 (age 20)	2025	Selangor U-23	

== Transfers ==
=== Loan returns ===
Date	Pos.	No.	Player	From	Type	Fee	Ref.
First team
1 June 2026	GK	23	(Malaysia) Samuel Somerville	(Malaysia) Melaka	Loan return	N/A	N/A
1 June 2026	MF	37	(Thailand) Picha Autra	(Thailand) Bangkok United	Loan return	N/A	N/A
1 June 2026	FW	48	(Afghanistan) Omid Musawi	(Malaysia) Penang	Loan return	N/A	N/A

=== In ===
Date	Pos.	No.	Player	From	Type	Fee	Ref.
First team
25 June 2026	MF	9	(France) Hugo Boumous	(India) Odisha	Contract termination	Free transfer	
30 June 2026	DF	16	(Malaysia) A. Selvan	(Malaysia) Negeri Sembilan	Contract expired	Free transfer	
30 June 2026	MF	19	(Malaysia) Azam Azih	(Malaysia) Kelantan The Real Warriors	Contract expired	Free transfer	
1 July 2026	DF	46	(Malaysia) Adib Ra'op	(Malaysia) Penang	Contract expired	Free transfer	
1 July 2026	DF	40	(Philippines) Jefferson Tabinas	(Thailand) Buriram United	Contract expired	Free transfer	
1 July 2026	MF	10	(Venezuela) Eduardo Sosa	(Malaysia) Immigration	Contract expired	Free transfer	
16 July 2026	MF	8	(Australia) Peter Makrillos	(Vietnam) Cong An Ho Chi Minh City	Contract expired	Free transfer	
5 August 2026	DF	5	(Kosovo) Arbenit Xhemajli	(Albania) KF Egnatia	Transfer	Undisclosed (Note: Fee reported as RM473,000 (€100,000).)	
13 August 2026	FW	11	(Netherlands) Kay Tejan	(Netherlands) SC Telstar	Contract termination	Free transfer	

=== Out ===
Date	Pos.	No.	Player	To	Type	Fee	Ref.
First team
12 June 2026 (Note: The transfer was announced on 22 May 2026, and would become official on 12 June when the transfer window reopened.)	MF	37	(Thailand) Picha Autra	(Thailand) Bangkok United	Transfer	Undisclosed	
27 June 2026	DF	3	(Jordan) Mohammad Abualnadi	(Romania) Corvinul Hunedoara	Contract expired	Free transfer	
27 June 2026	FW	11	(Cape Verde) Alvin Fortes	(Kuwait) Al-Fahaheel	Contract expired	Free transfer	
27 June 2026	FW	17	(South Korea) Kim Ji-ho	(South Korea) Suwon Samsung Bluewings	Loan return	None	
27 June 2026	MF	19	(South Korea) Jeon Seung-min	(South Korea) Changwon City	Contract expired	Free transfer	
27 June 2026	GK	23	(Malaysia) Samuel Somerville	(Brunei) DPMM	Contract expired	Free transfer	
27 June 2026	FW	48	(Afghanistan) Omid Musawi	(Afghanistan) Abu Muslim	Contract expired	Free transfer	
27 June 2026	DF	66	(Senegal) Mamadou Diarra	Free agent	Contract expired	Free transfer	
27 June 2026	DF	93	(Malaysia) Fazly Mazlan	(Malaysia) Penang	Contract expired	Free transfer	
27 June 2026	MF	96	(France) Mahamé Siby	(Singapore) Hougang United (Note: Joined Hougang United on 17 September 2026.)	Contract expired	Free transfer	
16 July 2026	MF	8	(Jordan) Noor Al-Rawabdeh	(Jordan) Al-Faisaly	Contract expired	Free transfer	
Reserve team
1 June 2026	FW	38	(Malaysia) Rahman Daud	(Malaysia) Negeri Sembilan	Contract expired	Free transfer	
27 June 2026	DF	32	(Malaysia) Raimi Shamsul	(Malaysia) Negeri Sembilan	Contract expired	Free transfer	
27 June 2026	FW	42	(Malaysia) Harry Danish	(Malaysia) Perak FA	Contract expired	Free transfer	

=== Loans out ===
Date	Pos.	No.	Player	Loaned to	Type	On loan until	Fee	Ref.
First team
26 June 2026	MF	77	(Malaysia) Aliff Haiqal	(Malaysia) Penang	Loan	End of season	None	

== Pre-season and friendlies ==
Selangor announced they would be touring for the third time in a row to Thailand for pre-season friendlies.

28 July 2026 Friendly	Ratchaburi (Thailand)	0–4	(Malaysia) Selangor	Ratchaburi
19:00 UTC+7		Report	Chrigor 39' (pen.); Makrillos 45+1'; A. Izwan 67'; Ankrah 89'	Stadium: Dragon Solar Park; Attendance: TBC; Referee: Songkran Bunmeekiart (Thailand)

31 July 2026 Friendly	Tai Po (Hong Kong)	0–1	(Malaysia) Selangor	Bang Phli, Samut Prakan
17:00 UTC+7		Report		Stadium: Windmill Training Center
Note: The match was played behind-closed-doors.

4 August 2026 Friendly	Sukhothai (Thailand)	0–0	(Malaysia) Selangor	Bang Bo, Samut Prakan
17:00 UTC+7		Report		Stadium: Dynamic Football Camp
Note: The match was played behind-closed-doors.

7 August 2026 Friendly	PT Prachuap (Thailand)	0–4	(Malaysia) Selangor	Bangkok
17:45 UTC+7		Report		Stadium: NT Stadium
Note: The match was played behind-closed-doors.

== Competitions ==
=== Overview ===
Competition	First match	Last match	Starting round	Final position	Record							
Competition	First match	Last match	Starting round	Final position	Pld	W	D	L	GF	GA	GD	Win %
Super League	22 August 2026	May 2027	Matchday 1	2nd	6	6	0	0	17	4	+13	100.00
FA Cup	2 September 2026	8 November 2026	Round of 16	Semi-finals	6	3	1	2	12	10	+2	50.00
Malaysia Cup	22–24 January 2027	TBD 2027	Round of 16	TBD	0	0	0	0	0	0	+0	—
Total					12	9	1	2	29	14	+15	75.00

Last updated: 8 November 2026
Source: Soccerway

=== Super League ===
==== Table ====
Pos	Team	Pld	W	D	L	GF	GA	GD	Pts	Qualification or relegation
1	Johor Darul Ta'zim	6	6	0	0	28	0	+28	18	Qualification for the AFC Champions League Elite league stage
2	Selangor	6	6	0	0	17	4	+13	18	Qualification for the AFC Champions League Two group stage
3	Kuching City	6	4	0	2	17	7	+10	12	
4	DPMM (Note: DPMM cannot qualify for Asian Football Confederation competitions as they are based in Brunei.)	6	4	0	2	9	8	+1	12	
5	Sabah	6	3	1	2	9	6	+3	10	

Updated to match(es) played on 1 November 2026. Source: Malaysian Football League
Rules for classification: 1) Points; 2) Goal difference; 3) Number of goals scored.

==== Results summary ====
Overall								Home						Away					
Pld	W	D	L	GF	GA	GD	Pts	W	D	L	GF	GA	GD	W	D	L	GF	GA	GD
6	6	0	0	17	4	+13	18	4	0	0	10	3	+7	2	0	0	7	1	+6

Source: Super League fixtures and results

==== Results by matchday ====
Round	1	2	3	4	5	6	7	8	9	10	11	12	13	14	15	16	17	18	19	20	21	22
Ground	A	A	H	H	H	H	A	H	A	A	A	H	A	H	A	A	A	A	H	H	H	H
Result	W	W	W	W	W	W																
Position	1	2	3	3	2	2																

Source: Super League fixtures and results
A = Away; H = Home; W = Win; D = Draw; L = Loss; C = Cancelled

==== Matches ====
The league fixtures were announced on 21 July 2026.

Win Draw Loss

22 August 2026 1	Kelantan Red Warrior	1–4	Selangor	Kota Bharu
21:00 UTC+08:00	Arham (yellow card) 41'; Musa 60'	Report (1); Report (2)	Chrigor 18', 75'; Faisal 27', 49'; Boumous (yellow card) 42'; Selvan (yellow card) 47'	Stadium: Sultan Muhammad IV Stadium; Attendance: 5,309; Referee: Kamil Zakaria

28 August 2026 2	Terengganu	0–3	Selangor	Kuala Nerus
21:00 UTC+08:00	Kastaneer (yellow card) 65'	Report (1); Report (2)	Chrigor (yellow card) 47' (goal) 63', 90+2'; Tabinas (yellow card) 56'; Tejan 59'	Stadium: Sultan Mizan Zainal Abidin Stadium; Attendance: 11,451; Referee: Shukor Zulkiflee

6 September 2026 3	Selangor	3–2	Melaka	Petaling Jaya
20:15 UTC+08:00	Chrigor 12', 51'; Tejan (red card) 44'; Harith (yellow card) 80'; Tabinas 90+1'	Report (1); Report (2)	Syahir 59' (yellow card) 71'; Dong-hyun 75'; Christian (yellow card) 90+4'	Stadium: MBPJ Stadium; Attendance: 3,775; Referee: Tuan Mohd Yaasin

13 September 2026 4	Selangor	3–0	Kuala Lumpur City	Petaling Jaya
20:15 UTC+08:00	Selvan 26'; Chrigor 51'; Sosa 73'	Report (1); Report (2)	Ibrahim (yellow card) 29'; Saiful (yellow card) 55'	Stadium: MBPJ Stadium; Attendance: 4,803; Referee: Usaid Jamal

17 October 2026 5	Selangor	3–1	Penang	Petaling Jaya
20:15 UTC+08:00	Chrigor 11', 51'; Boumous (yellow card) 48'; Zikri 90+4'	Report (1); Report (2)	Haqimi (yellow card) 38'; Khairul Akmal (yellow card) 63'; Brundo 69'; Khalai'f (yellow card) 88'	Stadium: MBPJ Stadium; Attendance: 3,170; Referee: Kamil Zakaria

1 November 2026 6	Selangor	1–0	Star City	Petaling Jaya
21:00 UTC+08:00	Boumous 16'; Laine (yellow card) 34'; Chrigor (red card) 83'	Report (1); Report (2)	Aiman (yellow card) 53'; Pedro Santos (yellow card) 90'	Stadium: MBPJ Stadium; Attendance: 3,172; Referee: Faizal Talib

28 November 2026 7	Sabah	v	Selangor	Kota Kinabalu
20:15 UTC+08:00				Stadium: Likas Stadium

5 December 2026 8	Selangor	v	(Brunei) DPMM	Petaling Jaya
21:00 UTC+08:00				Stadium: MBPJ Stadium

12 December 2026 9	Negeri Sembilan	v	Selangor	Paroi
17:00 UTC+08:00				Stadium: Tuanku Abdul Rahman Stadium

20 December 2026 10	Kuching City	v	Selangor	Kuching
16:45 UTC+08:00				Stadium: Taha Ariffin Stadium

23 December 2026 11	Johor Darul Ta'zim	v	Selangor	Iskandar Puteri
20:15 UTC+08:00				Stadium: Sultan Ibrahim Stadium

2 January 2027 12	Selangor	v	Kelantan Red Warrior	Petaling Jaya
21:00 UTC+08:00				Stadium: MBPJ Stadium

10 January 2027 13	Star City	v	Selangor	Kangar
21:00 UTC+08:00				Stadium: Tuanku Syed Putra Stadium

2 February 2027 14	Selangor	v	Kuching City	Petaling Jaya
21:00 UTC+08:00				Stadium: MBPJ Stadium

20 February 2027 15	Melaka	v	Selangor	Krubong
22:00 UTC+08:00				Stadium: Hang Jebat Stadium

20 March 2027 16	Kuala Lumpur City	v	Selangor	Cheras
17:30 UTC+08:00				Stadium: Kuala Lumpur Stadium

3 April 2027 17	Penang	v	Selangor	George Town
16:45 UTC+08:00				Stadium: City Stadium

24 April 2027 18	DPMM (Brunei)	v	Selangor	Bandar Seri Begawan
20:15 UTC+08:00				Stadium: Hassanal Bolkiah National Stadium

2 May 2027 19	Selangor	v	Negeri Sembilan	Petaling Jaya
20:15 UTC+08:00				Stadium: MBPJ Stadium

7 May 2027 20	Selangor	v	Terengganu	Petaling Jaya
21:00 UTC+08:00				Stadium: MBPJ Stadium

14 May 2027 21	Selangor	v	Johor Darul Ta'zim	Petaling Jaya
20:15 UTC+08:00				Stadium: MBPJ Stadium

May 2027 22	Selangor	v	Sabah	Petaling Jaya
TBC UTC+08:00				Stadium: MBPJ Stadium

==== Results overview ====
Win Draw Loss Cancelled

Team	Home score	Away score	Double
(Brunei) DPMM			
Johor Darul Ta'zim			
Kelantan Red Warrior		4–1	
Kuching City			
Kuala Lumpur City	3–0		
Melaka	3–2		
Negeri Sembilan			
Penang	3–1		
Sabah			
Star City	1–0		
Terengganu		3–0	

=== FA Cup ===
As a Super League side, Selangor entered the competition in the round of 16.

==== Round of 16 ====
2 September 2026 First leg	Sabah	2–2	Selangor	Kota Kinabalu
19:30 UTC+08:00	Ingham 33'; Halim 58' (yellow card) 69'; Hanafie (yellow card) 90+1'	Report (1); Report (2)	Tejan 35'; Chrigor 50'; Safuwan (yellow card) 73' (yellow-red card) 79'	Stadium: Likas Stadium; Attendance: 6,913; Referee: Izwan Abdullah

9 September 2026 Second leg	Selangor	2–1 (4–3 agg.)	Sabah	Petaling Jaya
21:00 UTC+08:00	Chrigor (yellow card) 35' (goal) 56'; Sosa 36'; Boumous (yellow card) 88'	Report (1); Report (2)	Park (yellow card) 14' (goal) 49'; Fadzrul (yellow card) 19'; Hanafie (yellow card) 47'	Stadium: MBPJ Stadium; Attendance: 0 Referee: Nawal Zubir
Note: Selangor was punished with playing behind closed doors (without spectators) following incidents involving supporter misconduct during the second leg of the quarter-finals last season against Negeri Sembilan at the MBPJ Stadium, Petaling Jaya on 29 October 2025.

==== Quarter-finals ====
19 September 2026 First leg	Star City	1–4	Selangor	Kangar
21:00 UTC+08:00	Atede 18'; D. Oliveira (yellow card) 80'	Report (1); Report (2)	Chrigor 21', 61', 87' (yellow card) 88'; Cheng (yellow card) 39'; Pernambuco 43'; Makrillos (yellow card) 79'	Stadium: Tuanku Syed Putra Stadium; Attendance: 1,413; Referee: Nazmi Nasaruddin

11 October 2026 Second leg	Selangor	2–3 (6–4 agg.)	Star City	Petaling Jaya
20:30 UTC+08:00	Zikri 8'; Pernambuco 35'; Syahir (yellow card) 45'; Xhemajli (yellow card) 60'	Report (1); Report (2)	Atede (yellow card) 43' (goal) 61'; Pedro Santos (yellow card) 16' (goal) 75'; Rafael Vitor (yellow card) 45+2'; Machado 90'; Endrick (yellow card) 90+4'	Stadium: MBPJ Stadium; Attendance: 3,757; Referee: Nasruddin Tamrin

==== Semi-finals ====
23 October 2026 First leg	Selangor	2–1	Kuching City	Petaling Jaya
21:00 UTC+08:00	Sosa 19', 58'; Tejan (yellow card) 65'	Report (1); Report (2)	Ramadhan 9'; João Pedro (yellow card) 50'; Okwuosa (yellow card) 61'	Stadium: MBPJ Stadium; Attendance: 7,092; Referee: Nazmi Nasaruddin

8 November 2026 Second leg	Kuching City	2–0 (3–2 agg.)	Selangor	Kuching
19:45 UTC+08:00	Yamazaki (yellow card) 44'; Safawi 57' (pen.); Mukhairi 118' (o.g.); Nazmi (yellow card) 120'	Report (1); Report (2)	Sosa (yellow card) 12' (yellow-red card) 120+1'; Chrigor (yellow card) 44'; Boumous (yellow card) 90+7'; Zikri (yellow card) 120'	Stadium: Taha Ariffin Stadium; Attendance: TBC; Referee: Izwan Abdullah

=== Malaysia Cup ===
==== Knockout stage ====
As a Super League side, Selangor entered the competition in the round of 16.

==== Round of 16 ====
22–24 January 2027 First leg	To be determined	v	Selangor	TBD
TBD UTC+08:00				Stadium: TBD

29–31 January 2027 Second leg	Selangor	v	To be determined	Petaling Jaya
TBD UTC+08:00				Stadium: MBPJ Stadium

== Statistics ==
=== Squad statistics ===
As of 8 November 2026

Appearances (Apps.) numbers are for appearances in competitive games only including sub appearances.
Red card numbers denote: Numbers in parentheses represent red cards overturned for wrongful dismissal.

No.	Nat.	Player	Pos.	Super League				FA Cup				Malaysia Cup				Total			
No.	Nat.	Player	Pos.	Apps	Goal	Yellow card	Red card	Apps	Goal	Yellow card	Red card	Apps	Goal	Yellow card	Red card	Apps	Goal	Yellow card	Red card
2	(Malaysia)	Quentin Cheng	DF	6				5		1						11		1	
4	(Ghana)	Richmond Ankrah	DF	1				2								3			
5	(Kosovo)	Arbenit Xhemajli	DF	6				5		1						11		1	
6	(Malaysia)	Nooa Laine	MF	6		1		6								12		1	
7	(Malaysia)	Faisal Halim	FW	4	2			3								7	2		
8	(Australia)	Peter Makrillos	MF	5				4		1						9		1	
9	(France)	Hugo Boumous	MF	6	1	2		4		2						10	1	4	
10	(Venezuela)	Eduardo Sosa	MF	3	1			5	3		1					8	4		1
11	(Netherlands)	Kay Tejan	FW	4	1		1	5	1	1						9	2	1	1
14	(Malaysia)	Zikri Khalili	DF	5	1			5	1	1						10	2	1	
16	(Malaysia)	A. Selvan	DF	6	1	1		6								12	1	1	
19	(Malaysia)	Azam Azih	MF	1				1								2			
20	(Malaysia)	Azim Al-Amin	GK	1												1			
21	(Singapore)	Safuwan Baharudin	DF	4				5			1					9			1
24	(Ghana)	Alex Agyarkwa	MF	1												1			
28	(Malaysia)	Muhammad Khalil	MF					1								1			
29	(Malaysia)	Mukhairi Ajmal	MF	1				2								3			
31	(Malaysia)	Sikh Izhan Nazrel	GK	5				4								9			
33	(Malaysia)	Kalamullah Al-Hafiz	GK	1				2								3			
34	(Malaysia)	Haykal Danish	FW					1								1			
37	(Brazil)	Pedro Ataíde	FW					1								1			
40	(Philippines)	Jefferson Tabinas	DF	5	1	1		4								9	1	1	
43	(Malaysia)	Syahir Bashah	MF	4				5		1						9		1	
44	(Malaysia)	Sharul Nazeem	DF					1								1			
46	(Malaysia)	Adib Ra'op	DF	4				3								7			
55	(Malaysia)	Harith Haiqal	DF	4		1		4								8		1	
76	(Malaysia)	Aliff Izwan	MF	3				3								6			
91	(Brazil)	Chrigor	FW	6	9	1	1	5	5	3						11	14	4	1
98	(Brazil)	Vitor Pernambuco	FW	4				5	2							9	2		
Own goals					0				0				0				0		
Totals					17	7	2		12	11	2		0	0	0		29	18	4

=== Goalscorers ===
As of match played 8 November 2026

Includes all competitive matches. The list is sorted alphabetically by surname when total goals are equal.

Rank	Pos.	No.	Player	Super League	FA Cup	Malaysia Cup	Total
1	FW	91	(Brazil) Chrigor	9	5	0	14
2	MF	10	(Venezuela) Eduardo Sosa	1	3	0	4
3	FW	7	(Malaysia) Faisal Halim	2	0	0	2
3	FW	11	(Netherlands) Kay Tejan	1	1	0	2
3	DF	14	(Malaysia) Zikri Khalili	1	1	0	2
3	FW	98	(Brazil) Vitor Pernambuco	0	2	0	2
7	MF	9	(France) Hugo Boumous	1	0	0	1
7	MF	16	(Malaysia) A. Selvan	1	0	0	1
7	DF	40	(Philippines) Jefferson Tabinas	1	0	0	1
Own goals				0	0	0	0
Totals				17	12	0	29

† Player left the club during the season.

=== Top assists ===
Rnk	Pos	No.	Player	Super League	FA Cup	Malaysia Cup	Total
1	FW	91	(Brazil) Chrigor	3	1	0	4
2	DF	2	(Malaysia) Quentin Cheng	2	0	0	2
2	MF	9	(France) Hugo Boumous	1	1	0	2
2	DF	40	(Philippines) Jefferson Tabinas	1	1	0	2
2	DF	46	(Malaysia) Adib Ra'op	0	2	0	2
2	FW	98	(Brazil) Vitor Pernambuco	1	1	0	2
7	MF	6	(Malaysia) Nooa Laine	1	0	0	1
7	FW	7	(Malaysia) Faisal Halim	0	1	0	1
7	MF	8	(Australia) Peter Makrillos	0	1	0	1
7	DF	16	(Malaysia) A. Selvan	1	0	0	1
7	MF	43	(Malaysia) Syahir Bashah	0	1	0	1
7	MF	76	(Malaysia) Aliff Izwan	0	1	0	1
Totals				10	10	0	20

† Player left the club during the season.

=== Clean sheets ===
Rnk	No.	Player	Super League	FA Cup	Malaysia Cup	Total
1	31	(Malaysia) Sikh Izhan Nazrel	3	0	0	3
Totals			3	0	0	3

=== Disciplinary record ===
As of match played 8 November 2026

Includes all competitive matches. The list is sorted alphabetically by surname when total cards are equal.

Rank	No.	Pos.	Player	Super League			FA Cup			Malaysia Cup			Total		
Rank	No.	Pos.	Player	Yellow card	(yellow card) (yellow-red card)	Red card	Yellow card	(yellow card) (yellow-red card)	Red card	Yellow card	(yellow card) (yellow-red card)	Red card	Yellow card	(yellow card) (yellow-red card)	Red card
1	9	MF	(France) Hugo Boumous	2	-	-	2	-	-	-	-	-	4	-	-
1	91	FW	(Brazil) Chrigor	1	-	1	3	-	-	-	-	-	4	-	1
3	2	DF	(Malaysia) Quentin Cheng	-	-	-	1	-	-	-	-	-	1	-	-
3	5	DF	(Kosovo) Arbenit Xhemajli	-	-	-	1	-	-	-	-	-	1	-	-
3	6	MF	(Malaysia) Nooa Laine	1	-	-	-	-	-	-	-	-	1	-	-
3	8	MF	(Australia) Peter Makrillos	-	-	-	1	-	-	-	-	-	1	-	-
3	10	MF	(Venezuela) Eduardo Sosa	-	-	-	-	1	-	-	-	-	-	1	-
3	11	FW	(Netherlands) Kay Tejan	-	-	1	1	-	-	-	-	-	1	-	1
3	14	DF	(Malaysia) Zikri Khalili	-	-	-	1	-	-	-	-	-	1	-	-
3	16	DF	(Malaysia) A. Selvan	1	-	-	-	-	-	-	-	-	1	-	-
3	21	DF	(Singapore) Safuwan Baharudin	-	-	-	-	1	-	-	-	-	-	1	-
3	40	DF	(Philippines) Jefferson Tabinas	1	-	-	-	-	-	-	-	-	1	-	-
3	43	MF	(Malaysia) Syahir Bashah	-	-	-	1	-	-	-	-	-	1	-	-
3	55	DF	(Malaysia) Harith Haiqal	1	-	-	-	-	-	-	-	-	1	-	-
Total				7	0	2	11	2	0	0	0	0	18	2	2

† Player left the club during the season.

=== Hat-tricks ===
Player	Against	Result	Date	Competition	Ref
(Brazil) Chrigor	Star City (A)	4–1	19 September 2026	FA Cup	

^{4} Player scored four goals.
