= 2026–27 Malaysia FA Cup =

Tournament details
- Country: Malaysia
- Dates: 1 September 2026 – 16 January 2027
- Teams: 16

Tournament statistics
- Matches played: 28
- Goals scored: 105 (3.75 per match)
- Top goal scorer(s): (6 goals); Jordan Murray
- All statistics correct as of 8 November 2026. (Note: All statistics do not include qualifying play-offs)

The 2026–27 Malaysia FA Cup was the 36th edition of the Malaysia FA Cup, a knockout competition for Malaysian association football clubs. The FA Cup is the main domestic cup competition for men's football teams in Malaysia. The tournament proper starting on 1 September 2026. The winners, if eligible, would be assured a place in the 2027–28 AFC Champions League Two group stage.

Johor Darul Ta'zim (JDT) are the fourth-time defending champions, having beaten Sabah in the last final.

== Qualified teams ==
The FA Cup is a knockout competition with 16 teams taking part all trying to reach the final at Sultan Ibrahim Stadium on 16 January 2027. The competition consisted of 12 teams from the Super League and 4 teams from A1 Semi-Pro League.

The following teams played in the competition. Reserve teams were excluded.

| Malaysia Super League the 12 teams of the 2026–27 season | Malaysia A1 Semi-Pro League the 4 teams of the 2026–27 season |
|---|---|
| (Brunei) DPMM; Johor Darul Ta'zim; Kelantan Red Warrior; Kuching City; Kuala Lumpur City; Melaka; Negeri Sembilan; Penang; Sabah; Selangor; Star City; Terengganu | Kedah FA; Kelantan City; Perak FA; UM-Damansara United |

== Format ==
The Malaysian Football League (MFL) announced a same format where only 16 teams will be involved in this competition. The final stages of the competition would feature a format change: The round of 16, quarter-finals and semi-finals will be played two legs (home & away), except for the final which was played as a single leg. Accordingly, if in a two-legged tie two teams scored the same number of aggregate goals, the winner of the tie would not be decided by the number of away goals scored by each team but always by 30 minutes of extra time, and if the two teams scored the same number of goals in extra time, the winner would be decided by a penalty shoot-out.

== Seeding ==
The seeded teams were drawn against the unseeded teams, with the seeded teams become hosting for the round of 16.

For the draw, the teams were seeded and unseeded into two pots based on the following principles (introduced starting this season):

- Pot A contained the final standings of top 8 teams from 2025–26 Super League.
- Pot B contained the final standings of 9th until 12th placed teams from 2025–26 Super League, and the 4 teams selected from 2026–27 A1 Semi-Pro League, based on subject approval from the MFL Board of Directors.

Key to colours
Teams from 2026–27 Malaysia Super League
Teams from 2026–27 Malaysia A1 Semi-Pro League

Pot A (seeded)
| Rank | Team |
|---|---|
| 1 | Johor Darul Ta'zim |
| 2 | Kuching City |
| 3 | Selangor |
| 4 | Kuala Lumpur City |
| 5 | Terengganu |
| 6 | Star City |
| 7 | Negeri Sembilan |
| 8 | Penang |

Pot B (unseeded)
| Rank | Team |
|---|---|
| 9 | Sabah |
| 10 | (Brunei) DPMM |
| 11 | Melaka |
| 12 | Kelantan Red Warrior (P) |
| 13 | Kedah FA |
| 14 | Perak FA |
| 15 | UM-Damansara United |
| 16 | Kelantan City |

Note: (P) – Promoted.

== Draw dates ==
The draw for the 2026–27 Malaysia FA Cup was held on 24 August 2026.

| Phase | Round | First leg | Second leg |
|---|---|---|---|
| Knockout phase | Round of 16 | 1–2 September 2026 | 8–9 September 2026 |
| Knockout phase | Quarter-finals | 19–20 September 2026 | 9–11 October 2026 |
| Knockout phase | Semi-finals | 23 October 2026 | 8 November 2026 |
| Knockout phase | Final | 16 January 2027 | |

== Bracket ==
The bracket was decided after the draw.

Round of 16
(Brunei) DPMM | 2 | 3 | 5
Terengganu | 3 | 1 | 4
Perak FA | 0 | 0 | 0
Kuala Lumpur City | 1 | 0 | 1
Melaka | 0 | 1 | 1
Penang | 1 | 2 | 3
UM-Damansara United | 1 | 0 | 1
Johor Darul Ta'zim | 4 | 10 | 14
Kedah FA | 2 | 0 | 2
Star City | 2 | 2 | 4
Sabah | 2 | 1 | 3
Selangor | 2 | 2 | 4
Kelantan City | 2 | 2 | 4
Negeri Sembilan | 0 | 3 | 3
Kelantan Red Warrior | 0 | 1 | 1
Kuching City | 0 | 5 | 5

Quarter-finals
(Brunei) DPMM | 3 | 1 | 4
Kuala Lumpur City | 3 | 0 | 3
Penang | 2 | 1 | 3
Johor Darul Ta'zim | 7 | 4 | 11
Star City | 1 | 3 | 4
Selangor | 4 | 2 | 6
Kelantan City | 0 | 1 | 1
Kuching City | 0 | 4 | 4

Semi-finals
(Brunei) DPMM | 0 | 1 | 1
Johor Darul Ta'zim | 2 | 6 | 8
Selangor | 2 | 0 | 2
Kuching City | 1 | 2 | 3

Final
Johor Darul Ta'zim
Kuching City

== Round of 16 ==
A total of 16 teams played in the Round of 16. Ties were scheduled to be played in the week commencing August 2026. The first legs were played on 1 and 2 September, and the second legs were played on 8 and 9 September 2026.

Key: (1) = Super League; (2) = A1 Semi-Pro League

=== Summary ===
| Team 1 | Agg. | Team 2 | 1st leg | 2nd leg |
|---|---|---|---|---|
| UM-Damansara United (2) | 1–14 | Johor Darul Ta'zim (1) | 1–4 | 0–10 |
| Perak FA (2) | 0–1 | Kuala Lumpur City (1) | 0–1 | 0–0 |
| DPMM (1) (Brunei) | 5–4 | Terengganu (1) | 2–3 | 3–1 |
| Kelantan Red Warrior (2) | 1–5 | Kuching City (1) | 0–0 | 1–5 |
| Sabah (1) | 3–4 | Selangor (1) | 2–2 | 1–2 |
| Melaka (1) | 1–3 | Penang (1) | 0–1 | 1–2 |
| Kelantan City (2) | 4–3 | Negeri Sembilan (1) | 2–0 | 2–3 |
| Kedah FA (2) | 2–4 | Star City (1) | 2–2 | 0–2 |

=== Matches ===
First leg

1 September 2026
17:00 MYT

| UM-Damansara United (2) | 1–4 | Johor Darul Ta'zim (1) |
|---|---|---|
| Akmal 90+1' | Report (FAM); Report (MFL) | Jairo 3'; D. Bolt 29'; Hidalgo 42', 54' |

Sultan Ibrahim Stadium, Iskandar Puteri (Note: UM-Damansara United played their home matches at Sultan Ibrahim Stadium, Iskandar Puteri, instead of their regular home stadium UM Arena Stadium, Kuala Lumpur.)
Attendance: TBC
Referee: Faizal Talib

Second leg

8 September 2026
20:30 MYT

| Johor Darul Ta'zim (1) | 10–0 | UM-Damansara United (2) |
|---|---|---|
| Israfilov 5', 80'; Stoichkov 22', 48'; Wilkin 32', 75'; Daniesh 57', 87'; Zahedi 77', 90+1' | Report (FAM); Report (MFL) |

Sultan Ibrahim Stadium, Iskandar Puteri
Attendance: TBC
Referee: Zam Azwan Khan

Johor Darul Ta'zim won 14–1 on aggregate.

First leg

1 September 2026
17:00 MYT

| Perak FA (2) | 0–1 | Kuala Lumpur City (1) |
|---|---|---|
| | Report (FAM); Report (MFL) | Josué 85' (pen.) |

Manjung Municipal Council Stadium, Manjung
Attendance: TBC
Referee: Nazmi Nasaruddin

Second leg

9 September 2026
20:15 MYT

| Kuala Lumpur City (1) | 0–0 | Perak FA (2) |
|---|---|---|
| | Report (FAM); Report (MFL) |

Kuala Lumpur Stadium, Cheras
Attendance: TBC
Referee: Abang Azharudin Abdullah

Kuala Lumpur City won 1–0 on aggregate.

First leg

9 September 2026 (Note: The match was originally scheduled for 1 September 2026 and been postponed due to the current haze conditions and concerns over air quality.)
20:15 MYT

| DPMM (1) (Brunei) | 2–3 | Terengganu (1) |
|---|---|---|
| Murray 10', 36' | Report (FAM); Report (MFL) | Ubaidullah 32', 45+2'; Morales 86' |

Hassanal Bolkiah National Stadium, Bandar Seri Begawan
Attendance: TBC
Referee: Faizudin Ismail

Second leg

16 September 2026 (Note: The match was originally scheduled for 9 September 2026.)
21:00 MYT

| Terengganu (1) | 1–3 | (Brunei) DPMM (1) |
|---|---|---|
| Ott 44' | Report (FAM); Report (MFL) | Danial 8'; M. Oliveira 54'; Murray 65' |

Sultan Mizan Zainal Abidin Stadium, Kuala Nerus
Attendance: TBC
Referee: Hasrol Amir

DPMM won 5–4 on aggregate.

First leg

1 September 2026
21:00 MYT

| Kelantan Red Warrior (2) | 0–0 | Kuching City (1) |
|---|---|---|
| | Report (FAM); Report (MFL) |

Sultan Muhammad IV Stadium, Kota Bharu
Attendance: TBC
Referee: Razlan Joffri Ali

Second leg

8 September 2026
20:15 MYT

| Kuching City (1) | 5–1 | Kelantan Red Warrior (2) |
|---|---|---|
| Wenzel-Halls 10'; Safawi 29'; R. Ngah 53', 71' (pen.); Yamazaki 80' | Report (FAM); Report (MFL) | Mazwan 67' |

Kuala Lumpur Stadium, Cheras (Note: Kuching City played their home matches at Kuala Lumpur Stadium, Cheras, instead of their regular home stadium Taha Ariffin Stadium, Kuching, due to the current haze conditions and concerns over air quality.)
Attendance: TBC
Referee: Zamzaidi Katimin

Kuching City won 5–1 on aggregate.

First leg

2 September 2026
19:30 MYT

| Sabah (1) | 2–2 | Selangor (1) |
|---|---|---|
| Ingham 33'; Halim 58' | Report (FAM); Report (MFL) | Tejan 35'; Chrigor 50' |

Likas Stadium, Kota Kinabalu
Attendance: TBC
Referee: Izwan Abdullah

Second leg

9 September 2026
21:00 MYT

| Selangor (1) | 2–1 | Sabah (1) |
|---|---|---|
| Sosa 36'; Chrigor 56' | Report (FAM); Report (MFL) | Park 49' |

MBPJ Stadium, Petaling Jaya
Attendance: 0 (Note: Selangor was punished with playing behind closed doors (without spectators) following incidents involving supporter misconduct during the second leg of the quarter-finals against Negeri Sembilan at the MBPJ Stadium, Petaling Jaya on 29 October 2025.)
Referee: Nawal Zubir

Selangor won 4–3 on aggregate.

First leg

2 September 2026
20:00 MYT

| Melaka (1) | 0–1 | Penang (1) |
|---|---|---|
| | Report (FAM); Report (MFL) | Obilor 22' |

Hang Jebat Stadium, Krubong
Attendance: TBC
Referee: Zam Azwan Khan

Second leg

9 September 2026
16:30 MYT

| Penang (1) | 2–1 | Melaka (1) |
|---|---|---|
| Brundo 74'; Célestine 90+4' | Report (FAM); Report (MFL) | Sherman 35' |

City Stadium, George Town
Attendance: TBC
Referee: S. Logeswaran

Penang won 3–1 on aggregate.

First leg

2 September 2026
21:00 MYT

| Kelantan City (2) | 2–0 | Negeri Sembilan (1) |
|---|---|---|
| Nazri 8'; Uzochukwu 84' | Report (FAM); Report (MFL) |

Sultan Muhammad IV Stadium, Kota Bharu
Attendance: TBC
Referee: Hafizuan Khair

Second leg

8 September 2025
16:45 MYT

| Negeri Sembilan (1) | 3–2 | Kelantan City (2) |
|---|---|---|
| Minagawa 5'; Akhyar 38' (pen.); Park 90+1' | Report (FAM); Report (MFL) | Arbdallah 53'; Asraff 54' |

Tuanku Abdul Rahman Stadium, Paroi
Attendance: TBC
Referee: Ridzuan Husni

Kelantan City won 4–3 on aggregate.

First leg

2 September 2026
21:00 MYT

| Kedah FA (2) | 2–2 | Star City (1) |
|---|---|---|
| Arthur 42' (pen.); Zhafir 90+3' | Report (FAM); Report (MFL) | D. Oliveira 79'; P. Henrique 87' |

Darul Aman Stadium, Alor Setar
Attendance: TBC
Referee: Ridzuan Husni

Second leg

8 September 2026
21:00 MYT

| Star City (1) | 2–0 | Kedah FA (2) |
|---|---|---|
| P. Henrique 16'; D. Oliveira 58' | Report (FAM); Report (MFL) |

Tuanku Syed Putra Stadium, Kangar
Attendance: TBC
Referee: Nazmi Nasaruddin

Star City won 4–2 on aggregate.

== Quarter-finals ==
The first legs were played on 19 and 20 September, and the second legs were played on 9, 10 and 11 October 2026.

Key: (1) = Super League; (2) = A1 Semi-Pro League

=== Summary ===
| Team 1 | Agg. | Team 2 | 1st leg | 2nd leg |
|---|---|---|---|---|
| Star City (1) | 4–6 | Selangor (1) | 1–4 | 3–2 |
| Penang (1) | 3–11 | Johor Darul Ta'zim (1) | 2–7 | 1–4 |
| DPMM (1) (Brunei) | 4–3 | Kuala Lumpur City (1) | 3–3 | 1–0 |
| Kelantan City (2) | 1–4 | Kuching City (1) | 0–0 | 1–4 |

=== Matches ===
First leg

19 September 2026
21:00 MYT

| Star City (1) | 1–4 | Selangor (1) |
|---|---|---|
| Atede 18' | Report (FAM); Report (MFL) | Chrigor 21', 61', 87'; Pernambuco 43' |

Tuanku Syed Putra Stadium, Kangar
Attendance: 1,413
Referee: Nazmi Nasaruddin

Second leg

11 October 2026
20:30 MYT

| Selangor (1) | 2–3 | Star City (1) |
|---|---|---|
| Zikri 8'; Pernambuco 35' | Report (FAM); Report (MFL) | Atede 61'; Pedro Santos 75'; Machado 90' |

MBPJ Stadium, Petaling Jaya
Attendance: 3,757
Referee: Nasruddin Tamrin

Selangor won 6–4 on aggregate.

First leg

20 September 2026
17:00 MYT

| Penang (1) | 2–7 | Johor Darul Ta'zim (1) |
|---|---|---|
| Célestine 46'; Khalai'f 90+5' | Report (FAM); Report (MFL) | Bérgson 15'; Tapp 45+3', 70'; M. Guilherme 55'; Stoichkov 63'; Zahedi 68'; Arif 90+4' |

City Stadium, George Town
Attendance: 2,083
Referee: Izzul Fikri Kamaruzaman

Second leg

9 October 2026
17:00 MYT

| Johor Darul Ta'zim (1) | 4–1 | Penang (1) |
|---|---|---|
| Bérgson 13' (pen.); Méndez 23'; Zahedi 45+2'; Hidalgo 72' | Report (FAM); Report (MFL) | Brundo 86' |

Sultan Ibrahim Stadium, Iskandar Puteri
Attendance: 13,669
Referee: Izwan Abdullah

Johor Darul Ta'zim won 11–3 on aggregate.

First leg

20 September 2026
20:15 MYT

| DPMM (1) (Brunei) | 3–3 | Kuala Lumpur City (1) |
|---|---|---|
| Murray 18'; Farris 54'; M. Oliveira 58' | Report (FAM); Report (MFL) | Josué 33' (pen.); Baqiuddin 72'; Fareed 77' |

Hassanal Bolkiah National Stadium, Bandar Seri Begawan
Attendance: 3,873
Referee: Razlan Joffri Ali

Second leg

11 October 2026
20:15 MYT

| Kuala Lumpur City (1) | 0–1 | (Brunei) DPMM (1) |
|---|---|---|
| | Report (FAM); Report (MFL) | Murray 11' |

Kuala Lumpur Stadium, Cheras
Attendance: TBC
Referee: Izzul Fikri Kamaruzaman

DPMM won 4–3 on aggregate.

First leg

20 September 2026
21:00 MYT

| Kelantan City (2) | 0–0 | Kuching City (1) |
|---|---|---|
| | Report (FAM); Report (MFL) |

Sultan Muhammad IV Stadium, Kota Bharu
Attendance: 1,665
Referee: Zamzaidi Katimin

Second leg

10 October 2026
19:45 MYT

| Kuching City (1) | 4–1 | Kelantan City (2) |
|---|---|---|
| Tanigawa 11'; Mujagić 19', 67', 81' | Report (FAM); Report (MFL) | Hadin 45' |

Taha Ariffin Stadium, Kuching
Attendance: TBC
Referee: Tuan Mohamad Yaasin

Kuching City won 4–1 on aggregate.

== Semi-finals ==
The first legs were played on 23 October, and the second legs were played on 8 November 2026.

Key: (1) = Super League; (2) = A1 Semi-Pro League

=== Summary ===
| Team 1 | Agg. | Team 2 | 1st leg | 2nd leg |
|---|---|---|---|---|
| DPMM (1) (Brunei) | 1–8 | Johor Darul Ta'zim (1) | 0–2 | 1–6 |
| Selangor (1) | 2–3 | Kuching City (1) | 2–1 | 0–2 |

=== Matches ===
First leg

23 October 2026
20:15 MYT

| DPMM (1) (Brunei) | 0–2 | Johor Darul Ta'zim (1) |
|---|---|---|
| | Report (FAM); Report (MFL) | Bérgson 21'; Israfilov 72' |

Hassanal Bolkiah National Stadium, Bandar Seri Begawan
Attendance: 13,063
Referee: Kamil Zakaria

Second leg

8 November 2026
20:15 MYT

| Johor Darul Ta'zim (1) | 6–1 | (Brunei) DPMM (1) |
|---|---|---|
| J. Figueiredo 27'; Hidalgo 59'; Arribas 64'; Jairo 66'; Daniesh 88' (pen.); M. Guilherme 90+3' | Report (FAM); Report (MFL) | Murray 49' |

Sultan Ibrahim Stadium, Iskandar Puteri
Attendance: TBC
Referee: Firdaus Dahlan

Johor Darul Ta'zim won 8–1 on aggregate.

First leg

23 October 2026
21:00 MYT

| Selangor (1) | 2–1 | Kuching City (1) |
|---|---|---|
| Sosa 19', 58' | Report (FAM); Report (MFL) | Ramadhan 9' |

MBPJ Stadium, Petaling Jaya
Attendance: 7,092
Referee: Nazmi Nasaruddin

Second leg

8 November 2026
19:45 MYT

| Kuching City (1) | 2–0 (a.e.t.) | Selangor (1) |
|---|---|---|
| Safawi 57' (pen.); Mukhairi 118' (o.g.) | Report (FAM); Report (MFL) |

Taha Ariffin Stadium, Kuching
Attendance: TBC
Referee: Izwan Abdullah

Kuching City won 3–2 on aggregate.

== Final ==
The final will be played at the Sultan Ibrahim Stadium in Johor.

16 January 2027
21:00 MYT

| Johor Darul Ta'zim | v | Kuching City |

Sultan Ibrahim Stadium, Iskandar Puteri

== Top scorers ==
As of 8 November 2026

| Rank | Player | Club | Goals |
|---|---|---|---|
| 1 | (Australia) Jordan Murray | (Brunei) DPMM | 6 |
| 2 | (Brazil) Chrigor | Selangor | 5 |
| 3 | (Iran) Shahab Zahedi | Johor Darul Ta'zim | 4 |
| 3 | (Malaysia) Manuel Hidalgo | Johor Darul Ta'zim | 4 |
| 5 | (Azerbaijan) Eddy Israfilov | Johor Darul Ta'zim | 3 |
| 5 | (Malaysia) Bérgson | Johor Darul Ta'zim | 3 |
| 5 | (Malaysia) Daniesh Amirruddin | Johor Darul Ta'zim | 3 |
| 5 | (Spain) Stoichkov | Johor Darul Ta'zim | 3 |
| 5 | (Bosnia and Herzegovina) Ajdin Mujagić | Kuching City | 3 |
| 5 | (Venezuela) Eduardo Sosa | Selangor | 3 |
| 11 | 15 players | 8 clubs | 2 |
| 12 | 37 players | 15 clubs | 1 |

=== Own goals ===
| Rank | Player | Team | Against | Date | Goal |
|---|---|---|---|---|---|
| 1 | (Malaysia) Mukhairi Ajmal | Selangor | Kuching City | 8 November 2026 | 1 |

== See also ==
- 2026 Piala Sumbangsih
- 2026–27 Malaysia Super League
- 2027 Malaysia Cup
- 2027 MFL Challenge Cup
