= 2027 Malaysia FA Cup final =

Association football championship match

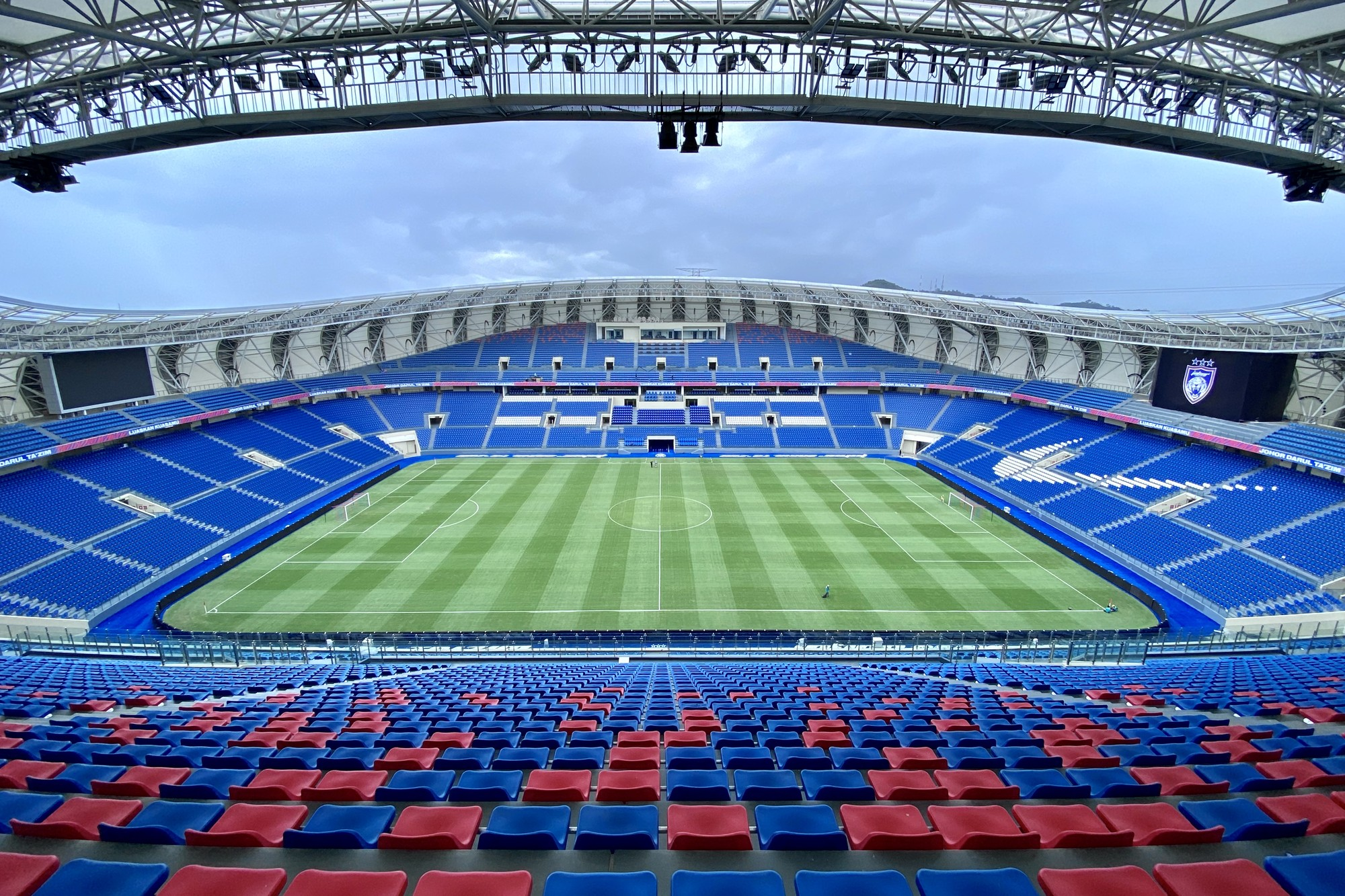
- The match took place at Sultan Ibrahim Stadium.
- Event: 2026–27 Malaysia FA Cup
Johor Darul Ta'zim	Kuching City
- Date: 16 January 2027
- Venue: Sultan Ibrahim Stadium, Iskandar Puteri

The 2027 Malaysia FA Cup final was an association football match between Johor Darul Ta'zim and Kuching City on 16 January 2027 at Sultan Ibrahim Stadium, Iskandar Puteri, Johor, due to the ongoing reconstruction of its usual venue, Bukit Jalil National Stadium. It was the 37th FA Cup final overall and was the showpiece match of Malaysian football's primary cup competition, the Malaysian Football Association Challenge Cup (Malaysia FA Cup), organised by the Football Association of Malaysia and Malaysian Football League.

The winners, if eligible, would be assured a place in the 2027–28 AFC Champions League Two group stage.

== Background ==
The Malaysian League competition schedule, which includes the FA Cup competition, has been released by the Malaysian Football League (MFL). The final match schedule is anticipated to take place on 16 January 2027. In October 2026, Bukit Jalil National Stadium, the final's traditional venue, was closed in anticipation of upgrading works on the field, running track, and facilities are currently underway in preparation for the 2027 SEA Games. Having considered alternative venues, the MFL announced on 4 November 2026 that the final venue would be staged at Sultan Ibrahim Stadium.

== Route to the final ==
Note: In all results below, the score of the finalist is given first (H: home; A: away).

Johor Darul Ta'zim				Round	Kuching City			
Opponent	Agg.	1st leg	2nd leg	Knockout phase	Opponent	Agg.	1st leg	2nd leg
UM-Damansara United	14–1	4–1 (A)	10–0 (H)	Round of 16	Kelantan Red Warrior	5–1	0–0 (A)	5–1 (H)
Penang	11–3	7–2 (A)	4–1 (H)	Quarter-finals	Kelantan City	4–1	0–0 (A)	4–1 (H)
(Brunei) DPMM	8–1	2–0 (A)	6–1 (H)	Semi-finals	Selangor	3–2	1–2 (A)	2–0 (H)

== Match ==
=== Details ===
16 January 2027
21:00 MYT

Johor Darul Ta'zim	v	Kuching City

Sultan Ibrahim Stadium , Iskandar Puteri

Johor Darul Ta'zim	Kuching City

Man of the Match:
To be determined

Assistant referees:
TBC
TBC
Fourth official:
TBC
Video assistant referee:
TBC
Assistant video assistant referee:
TBC

Match rules

- 90 minutes
- 30 minutes of extra time if necessary
- Penalty shoot-out if scores still level
- Nine named substitutes
- Maximum of five substitutions, with a sixth allowed in extra time (Note: Each team was given only three opportunities to make substitutions, with a fourth opportunity in extra time, excluding substitutions made at half-time, before the start of extra time and at half-time in extra time.)

== See also ==
- 2027 Malaysia Cup
- 2027 MFL Challenge Cup
