= 2020 Negeri Sembilan FA season =

Negeri Sembilan
2020 season
- President: Razman al-Qadri
- Head coach: Sazali Saidon
- Stadium: Tuanku Abdul Rahman Stadium
- Malaysia Premier League: 11th
- Top goalscorer: League: Igor Luiz (5); All: Igor Luiz (5)
| Home colours | Away colours | Third colours |

The 2020 season was Negeri Sembilan's 97th year in their history and 8th season in Malaysia Premier League since it was first introduced in 2004. Also it was the second season in the Malaysia Premier League since 2019 following relegation 2018 season. Along with the league, the club also participated in the Malaysia FA Cup and the Malaysia Cup.

== Events ==
The club has confirmed to retain all four foreign players from previous season for upcoming 2020 season.

On 9 February 2020, the club has launched the new kits and jerseys.

== Players ==
=== Current squad ===
As of 1 August 2020

Note: Flags indicate national team as defined under FIFA eligibility rules; some limited exceptions apply. Players may hold more than one non-FIFA nationality.

| No. | Pos. | Nation | Player |
|---|---|---|---|
| 1 | GK | MAS | Hamka Daud |
| 3 | DF | BRA | Matheus Vila |
| 4 | DF | MAS | A. Selvan |
| 5 | DF | MAS | Norhafiz Zamani (Captain) |
| 6 | MF | MAS | Asraf Roslan |
| 7 | MF | JPN | Shunsuke Nakatake |
| 8 | MF | MAS | Abdul Halim Zainal |
| 9 | MF | MAS | Shahurain Abu Samah |
| 10 | FW | BRA | Almir |
| 11 | DF | MAS | Adam Othman |
| 12 | GK | MAS | Kaharuddin Rahman (Vice-captain) |
| 13 | MF | MAS | Durrkeswaran Ganesan |
| 14 | DF | MAS | Danial Hadri |
| 16 | FW | MAS | Arip Amiruddin |

| No. | Pos. | Nation | Player |
|---|---|---|---|
| 17 | MF | MAS | Izuan Salahuddin |
| 18 | DF | MAS | Che Mohamad Safwan |
| 19 | FW | MAS | Aiman Khalidi |
| 20 | FW | BRA | Igor Luiz |
| 21 | MF | MAS | Khairul Anuar Yusri Lani |
| 22 | GK | MAS | Aizat Roslim |
| 23 | DF | MAS | Izaaq Izhan |
| 25 | MF | MAS | Azriddin Rosli |
| 27 | DF | MAS | Idham Zuhair |
| 28 | GK | MAS | Affendy Razali |
| 29 | FW | MAS | Fauzi Latif |
| 31 | FW | MAS | Nazrul Kamaruzaman |
| 55 | DF | MAS | Shahrom Kalam |
| 77 | MF | MAS | Shamie Iszuan |

== Competitions ==
=== Malaysia Premier League ===
==== League table ====
| Pos | Team | Pld | W | D | L | GF | GA | GD | Pts | Qualification or relegation |
|---|---|---|---|---|---|---|---|---|---|---|
| 8 | Kelantan United | 11 | 4 | 0 | 7 | 13 | 19 | −6 | 12 | |
| 9 | UKM | 11 | 3 | 3 | 5 | 11 | 17 | −6 | 12 | Withrew from Premier League and dissolved. |
| 10 | Sarawak United | 11 | 3 | 2 | 6 | 14 | 16 | −2 | 11 | |
| 11 | Negeri Sembilan | 11 | 3 | 2 | 6 | 12 | 20 | −8 | 11 | |
| 12 | Perak II (Note: Johor Darul Ta'zim II, Perak II, Selangor II and Terengganu II cannot be promoted from Malaysia Premier League and play in Malaysia Cup as Johor Darul Ta'zim F.C., Perak FA, Selangor F.C. and Terengganu FC (their parent clubs) remain in Malaysia Super League and play in Malaysia Cup. Should the team be relegated to Malaysia Premier League or will not play in Malaysia Cup, Johor Darul Ta'zim II, Perak II, Selangor II and Terengganu II will have to drop to Malaysia M3 League or will play in Malaysia Cup.) | 11 | 1 | 5 | 5 | 11 | 13 | −2 | 8 | |

Updated to match(es) played on 31 October 2020. Source: MFL
Rules for classification: 1) Points; 2) Goal difference; 3) Number of goals scored.

== Statistics ==
=== Appearances and goals ===
As of match played 9 October 2020

| No. | Pos | Nat | Player | Total | | League | |
| No. | Pos | Nat | Player | Apps | Goals | Apps | Goals |
|---|---|---|---|---|---|---|---|
| 3 | DF | (Brazil) BRA | Matheus Vila | 9 | 2 | 9 | 2 |
| 4 | MF | (Malaysia) MAS | Selvan Anbualagan | 10 | 0 | 2+8 | 0 |
| 5 | DF | (Malaysia) MAS | Norhafiz Zamani | 5 | 0 | 5 | 0 |
| 6 | MF | (Malaysia) MAS | Asraf Roslan | 1 | 0 | 0+1 | 0 |
| 7 | MF | (Japan) JPN | Shunsuke Nakatake | 11 | 0 | 11 | 0 |
| 8 | MF | (Malaysia) MAS | Abdul Halim Zainal | 9 | 0 | 7+2 | 0 |
| 9 | MF | (Malaysia) MAS | Shahurain Abu Samah | 3 | 0 | 1+2 | 0 |
| 10 | FW | (Brazil) BRA | Almir | 10 | 3 | 9+1 | 3 |
| 11 | DF | (Malaysia) MAS | Adam Othman | 6 | 0 | 5+1 | 0 |
| 12 | GK | (Malaysia) MAS | Kaharuddin Rahman | 11 | 0 | 11 | 0 |
| 14 | DF | (Malaysia) MAS | Danial Hadri | 4 | 0 | 3+1 | 0 |
| 16 | FW | (Malaysia) MAS | Arip Amiruddin | 4 | 0 | 4 | 0 |
| 17 | MF | (Malaysia) MAS | Izuan Salahuddin | 11 | 0 | 11 | 0 |
| 18 | DF | (Malaysia) MAS | Che Mohd Safwan | 5 | 0 | 0+5 | 0 |
| 19 | FW | (Malaysia) MAS | Aiman Khalidi | 4 | 0 | 2+2 | 0 |
| 20 | FW | (Brazil) BRA | Igor Luiz | 11 | 5 | 9+2 | 5 |
| 23 | DF | (Malaysia) MAS | Izaaq Izhan | 10 | 1 | 9+1 | 1 |
| 25 | MF | (Malaysia) MAS | Azriddin Rosli | 8 | 0 | 3+5 | 0 |
| 29 | FW | (Malaysia) MAS | Fauzi Latif | 6 | 0 | 2+4 | 0 |
| 31 | FW | (Malaysia) MAS | Nazrul Kamaruzaman | 5 | 0 | 5 | 0 |
| 55 | DF | (Malaysia) MAS | Shahrom Kalam | 6 | 0 | 6 | 0 |
| 77 | MF | (Malaysia) MAS | Shamie Iszuan | 7 | 1 | 7 | 1 |
Players transferred out during the season
