= Selvan Anbualagan =

Malaysian footballer

A. Selvan
Personal information
- Full name: Selvan a/l Anbualagan
- Date of birth: 5 November 2000 (age 26)
- Place of birth: Seremban, Negeri Sembilan, Malaysia
- Height: 1.63 m (5 ft 4 in)
- Positions: Forward; winger

Team information
- Current team: Selangor
- Number: 16

Youth career
- 2018–2019: Negeri Sembilan

Senior career*
Years	Team	Apps	(Gls)
2020–2026	Negeri Sembilan	99	(6)
2026–	Selangor	2	(0)

International career
2022	Malaysia U23	1	(1)
- * Club domestic league appearances and goals as of 30 June 2026

Selvan a/l Anbualagan (born 5 November 2000) is a Malaysian footballer who plays as a forward or winger for Malaysia Super League club Selangor.

== Club career ==
=== Negeri Sembilan ===
He started his football career for the senior team in 2020 after being promoted to the Negeri Sembilan FC first team.

on 16 July 2022, he scored the only goal for Negeri Sembilan FC in a friendly against Buriram United. The Asean Charity Shield 2022 match was held at the Rainbow Stadium, Pattani. The single goal could not help Negeri Sembilan FC after the full result ended with 2–1 in favor of Buriram United.

Up until 2024–25 season, he has been with the Negeri Sembilan FC team for 6 years and has made 88 appearances and scored 10 goals.

For the 2025–26 season, Selvan continues with Negeri Sembilan, marking his sixth consecutive year with the club. His long-term presence reflects his strong commitment to the team as both a player and a local talent who began his journey through the club's youth academy.

On 16 May 2026, Selvan announced that he would leave the club upon the expiry of his contract at the end of the season.

=== Selangor ===
On 30 June 2026, Selangor announced the signing of Selvan on a free transfer.

== International career ==
A. Selvan made his debut with the national U-23 squad during the qualifying match AFF U-23 Championship against Laos U-23 on February 8, 2022. Selvan managed to score his debut goal with the U-23 squad on (45 +1') extra time. However, the goal did not help the national under-21 squad when Laos managed to get 2 goals in the second half. The match ended with a 2–1 result.

== Career statistics ==
=== Club ===
As of 30 June 2026

Club	Season	League			Cup		League Cup		Total	
Club	Season	Division	Apps	Goals	Apps	Goals	Apps	Goals	Apps	Goals
Negeri Sembilan	2020	Malaysia Premier League	10	0	0	0	0	0	10	0
Negeri Sembilan	2021	Malaysia Premier League	19	1	0	0	1	0	20	1
Negeri Sembilan	2022	Malaysia Super League	17	0	0	0	3	0	20	0
Negeri Sembilan	2023	Malaysia Super League	16	2	0	0	3	0	19	2
Negeri Sembilan	2024–25	Malaysia Super League	15	3	0	0	4	3	19	6
Negeri Sembilan	2025–26	Malaysia Super League	22	0	4	0	3	0	29	0
Negeri Sembilan	Total		99	6	4	0	14	3	117	9
Selangor	2026–27	Malaysia Super League	0	0	0	0	0	0	0	0
Career total			99	6	4	0	14	3	117	9
