= 2026 Piala Sumbangsih =

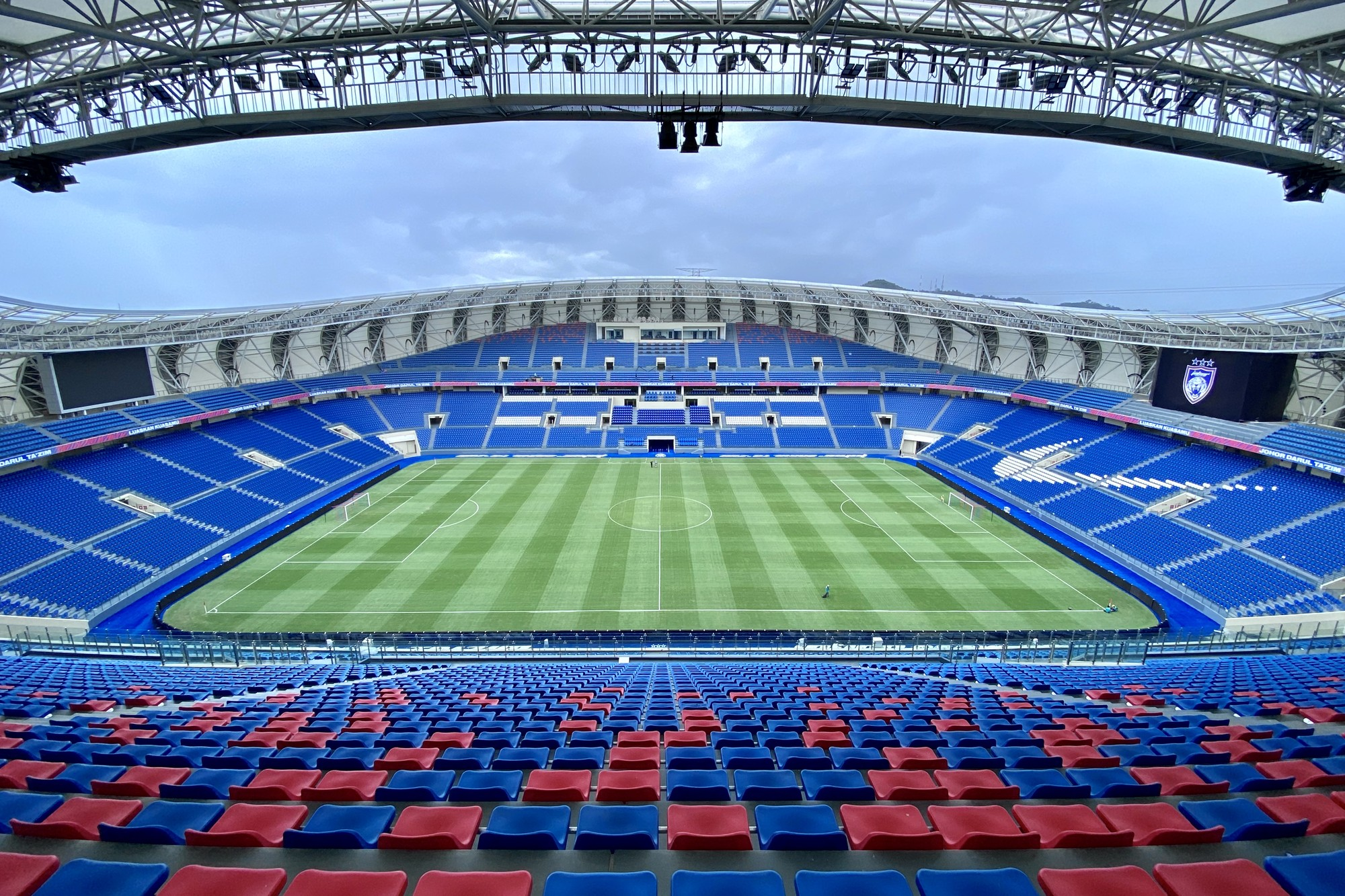
- Sultan Ibrahim Stadium was scheduled to host the match
| Johor Darul Ta'zim | Kuching City |
| 3 | 0 |
- Date: 21 August 2026
- Venue: Sultan Ibrahim Stadium, Iskandar Puteri, Johor
- Man of the Match: Arif Aiman (Johor Darul Ta'zim)
- Referee: Nazmi Nasaruddin
- Attendance: 32,372

The 2026 Piala Sumbangsih (also known as Malaysian Charity Shield) is the scheduled 41st edition of the Malaysian Charity Shield, an annual football match played between the winners of the previous season's Malaysia Super League and Malaysia FA Cup. It will be played at Sultan Ibrahim Stadium in Johor on 21 August 2026, and will feature the 2025–26 Malaysia Super League champions Johor Darul Ta'zim and the 2025–26 Malaysia Super League runners-up Kuching City.

== Background ==
Johor Darul Ta'zim (JDT) qualified for the Piala Sumbangsih after winning the 2025–26 Malaysia Super League. JDT also completed a domestic treble during the season by winning the Super League, FA Cup and Malaysia Cup. As the winners of both domestic cup competitions were the same club as the Super League champions, the additional qualification places for the Piala Sumbangsih were allocated to the next eligible team according to the competition's qualification provisions.

Kuching City, who finished as runners-up in the Super League, therefore qualified to face JDT. The match marked Kuching City's first appearance in the Piala Sumbangsih. Their qualification represented the club's highest achievement in the competition to date and gave them the opportunity to contest their first Malaysian Charity Shield.

== Match ==
=== Details ===
21 August 2026
21:00 MYT

| Johor Darul Ta'zim | 3–0 | Kuching City |
|---|---|---|
| Guilherme 11'; Arribas 55'; Zahedi 86' | Report |

Sultan Ibrahim Stadium, Iskandar Puteri
Attendance: 32,372
Referee: Izzul Fikri

| Johor Darul Ta'zim | Kuching City |

| GK | 16 | (Malaysia) Syihan Hazmi |
| CB | 5 | (Spain) Antonio Glauder | | (substituted off) 73' |
| CB | 26 | (Malaysia) Brad Tapp |
| CB | 81 | (Colombia) Kevin Medina |
| RM | 10 | (Malaysia) Arif Aiman (c) |
| CM | 21 | (Slovenia) Dejan Petrovič |
| CM | 28 | (Malaysia) Nacho Méndez | | (substituted off) 76' |
| LM | 24 | (Philippines) Óscar Arribas |
| RW | 77 | (Spain) Matías Nahuel | (yellow card) 16' | (substituted off) 59' |
| CF | 9 | (Malaysia) Bérgson | | (substituted off) 73' |
| LW | 95 | (Brazil) Marcos Guilherme |
Substitutes:
| GK | 1 | (Malaysia) Christian Abad |
| DF | 2 | (Malaysia) Matthew Davies |
| DF | 14 | (Malaysia) Shane Lowry | | (substituted on) 73' |
| DF | 22 | (Malaysia) Corbin-Ong |
| DF | 23 | (Azerbaijan) Eddy Israfilov |
| MF | 4 | (Malaysia) Afiq Fazail | | (substituted on) 76' |
| MF | 19 | (Spain) Stoichkov | | (substituted on) 59' |
| FW | 7 | (Iran) Shahab Zahedi | | (substituted on) 73' |
| FW | 88 | (Malaysia) Manuel Hidalgo |
Coach:
(Spain) Xisco Muñoz

| GK | 20 | (Malaysia) Haziq Nadzli |
| CB | 4 | (Brazil) Gabriel Peres |
| CB | 35 | (Nigeria) James Okwuosa (c) | (substituted off) 45' |
| CB | 77 | (Japan) Yuki Tanigawa |
| RM | 22 | (Timor-Leste) João Pedro | (substituted off) 81' |
| CM | 5 | (Malaysia) Ryan Lambert |
| CM | 44 | (Malaysia) Alif Hassan | (substituted off) 45' |
| LM | 23 | (Malaysia) Ariff Farhan |
| AM | 10 | (Namibia) Petrus Shitembi |
| CF | 18 | (Cameroon) Ronald Ngah | (substituted off) 64' |
| CF | 19 | (Malaysia) Gabriel Nistelrooy | (substituted off) 45' |
Substitutes:
| GK | 55 | (Malaysia) Shahril Sa'ari |
| DF | 17 | (Malaysia) Irfan Zakaria |
| DF | 27 | (Malaysia) Filemon Anyie | (substituted on) 81' |
| MF | 50 | (Malaysia) Diego Baggio |
| MF | 67 | (Malaysia) Shamie Iszuan | (substituted on) 45' |
| MF | 99 | (Jordan) Ahmad Israiwah | (substituted on) 45' |
| FW | 7 | (Malaysia) Ramadhan Saifullah | (substituted on) 45' |
| FW | 11 | (Cameroon) Jerome Etame | (substituted on) 64' |
| FW | 12 | (Australia) Dylan Wenzel-Halls |
Coach:
(Malaysia) Aidil Sharin Sahak

Man of the Match:
Arif Aiman (Johor Darul Ta'zim)

Assistant referees:
Zairul Khalil Tan
Hamdi Haji Omar
Fourth official:
Izwan Abdullah
Video assistant referee:
Firdaus Dahlan
Assistant video assistant referee:
Norazim Mustafa

Match rules

- 90 minutes
- Penalty shoot-out if scores still level
- Nine named substitutes, of which six may be used
