= Arbenit Xhemajli =

Kosovan footballer (born 1998)

Personal information
- Date of birth: 23 April 1998 (age 28)
- Place of birth: Brugg, Switzerland
- Height: 1.90 m (6 ft 3 in)
- Position: Centre-back

Team information
- Current team: Selangor
- Number: 5

Youth career
- 2015–2016: Zürich

Senior career*
Years	Team	Apps	(Gls)
2016–2017	Zürich U21	13	(0)
2017–2020	Neuchâtel Xamax	46	(2)
2020–2022	Sunderland	3	(0)
2022–2023	Vaduz	21	(2)
2023–2026	Egnatia	93	(1)
2026–	Selangor	2	(0)

International career^{‡}
2018–2019	Kosovo U21	6	(1)
2019	Kosovo	1	(0)
- * Club domestic league appearances and goals as of 25 June 2026 ‡ National team caps and goals as of 15 October 2019

Arbenit Xhemajli (born 23 April 1998) is a professional footballer who plays as a centre-back for Malaysia Super League club Selangor. Born in Switzerland, he represents Kosovo at international level.

== Club career ==
=== Neuchâtel Xamax ===
On 3 July 2017, Xhemajli joined Swiss Challenge League side Neuchâtel Xamax. On 12 August 2017, he made his debut in a 0–21 away deep win in the 2017–18 Swiss Cup first round against Montfaucon after being named in the starting line-up.

=== Sunderland ===
On 4 September 2020, Xhemajli signed a two-year contract with EFL League One club Sunderland. Four days later, he made his debut in 2020–21 EFL Trophy group stage against Aston Villa U21 after being named in the starting line-up. On 15 October 2020, it was announced that Xhemajli would be ruled out for the rest of the 2020–21 season after sustaining a knee injury on international duty.

=== Vaduz ===
On 5 August 2022, Xhemajli signed a two-year contract with Swiss Challenge League club Vaduz. Nine days later, he made his debut in a 2–4 home defeat against Thun after being named in the starting line-up.

=== Selangor ===
On 5 August 2026, Xhemajli moved to Asia by signing for Malaysia Super League giants Selangor for a reported fee of €100,000.

== International career ==
=== Youth ===
At the start of April 2013, Xhemajli received a call-up from Albania U15 for a selection camp in Switzerland. On 14 March 2018, Xhemajli received a call-up from Kosovo U21 for the 2019 UEFA European Under-21 Championship qualification matches against Azerbaijan U21 and Germany U21. His debut with Kosovo U21 came eight days later in a 2019 UEFA European Under-21 Championship qualification against Azerbaijan U21 after coming on as a substitute at 81st minute in place of the injured Besfort Kolgeci.

=== Senior ===
On 23 May 2018, Xhemajli received a call-up from Kosovo for the friendly match against Albania, he was an unused substitute in that match. His debut with Kosovo came on 10 October 2019 in a friendly match against Gibraltar after being named in the starting line-up.

== Career statistics ==
=== Club ===
As of 5 August 2026

Club	Season	League			Cup (Note: Appearances in Swiss Cup, FA Cup, Albanian Cup, Malaysia FA Cup)		League Cup (Note: Appearances in EFL Cup, Malaysia Cup)		Continental		Other		Total	
Club	Season	Division	Apps	Goals	Apps	Goals	Apps	Goals	Apps	Goals	Apps	Goals	Apps	Goals
Zürich U21	2016–17	1. Liga Promotion	13	0	0	0	—		4 (Note: Appearances in UEFA Youth League)	1	—		17	1
Neuchâtel Xamax	2017–18	Swiss Challenge League	6	0	—		—		—		—		6	0
Neuchâtel Xamax	2018–19	Swiss Super League	17	0	1	0	—		—		—		18	0
Neuchâtel Xamax	2019–20	Swiss Super League	23	2	2	0	—		—		—		25	2
Neuchâtel Xamax	Total		40	2	3	0	—		—		—		43	2
Sunderland	2020–21	League One	0	0	0	0	0	0	—		3 (Note: One appearances in EFL Trophy, two appearances in Premier League 2 with Sunderland U23)	0	3	0
Sunderland	2021–22	League One	3	0	0	0	0	0	—		7 (Note: One appearances in EFL Trophy, six appearances and one goal in Premier League 2 with Sunderland U23)	1	10	1
Sunderland	Total		3	0	0	0	0	0	—		10	1	13	1
Vaduz	2022–23	Swiss Challenge League	21	2	—		—		3 (Note: Appearances in UEFA Conference League)	0	—		24	2
Egnatia	2023–24	Kategoria Superiore	30	0	4	0	—		—		1 (Note: Appearances in Albanian Supercup)	0	35	0
Egnatia	2024–25	Kategoria Superiore	31	1	5	2	—		3 (Note: Two appearances in UEFA Champions League, one appearances in UEFA Conference League)	0	1	0	40	3
Egnatia	2025–26	Kategoria Superiore	32	0	4	0	—		6 (Note: Two appearances in UEFA Champions League, four appearances in UEFA Conference League)	0	1	0	43	0
Egnatia	2026–27	Kategoria Superiore	0	0	0	0	—		4 (Note: Appearances in UEFA Champions League)	0	0	0	4	0
Egnatia	Total		93	1	13	2	—		13	0	3	0	122	3
Selangor	2026–27	Malaysia Super League	0	0	0	0	0	0	—		—		0	0
Career total			176	5	16	2	0	0	20	1	13	1	225	9

=== International ===
As of 10 October 2019

Appearances and goals by national team and year
National team	Year	Apps	Goals
Kosovo	2019	1	0
Total		1	0

== Honours ==
Sunderland

- EFL League One play-offs: 2022

Egnatia

- Albanian Cup: 2023–24
