= Peter Makrillos =

Australian soccer player (born 1995)

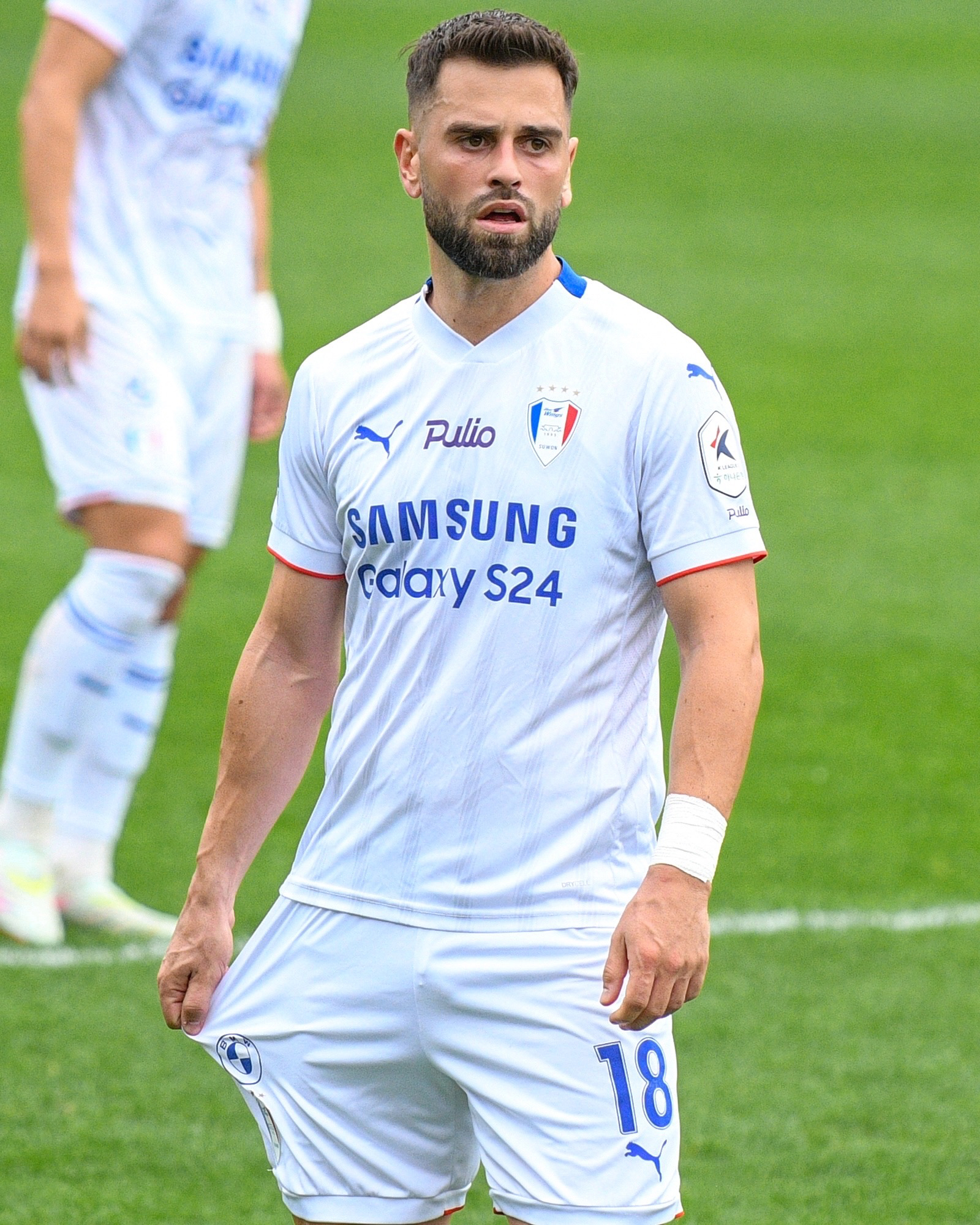
- Makrillos in 2024 with Suwon Samsung Bluewings

Personal information
- Full name: Peter Michael Makrillos
- Date of birth: 4 September 1995 (age 31)
- Place of birth: Sydney, Australia
- Height: 1.86 m (6 ft 1 in)
- Position: Midfielder

Team information
- Current team: Selangor
- Number: 8

Youth career
- –2008: Sutherland Sharks
- 2009–2015: Stoke City

Senior career*
Years	Team	Apps	(Gls)
2015–2016	Newcastle Town	12	(1)
2016–2017	Rockdale City	23	(4)
2017–2018	Sydney Olympic	7	(0)
2018–2019	Panionios	11	(0)
2020	IFK Mariehamn	19	(4)
2021–2022	Slavia Sofia	33	(9)
2022	Fredericia	13	(1)
2022	GIF Sundsvall	11	(1)
2023	Chungbuk Cheongju	32	(7)
2024	Seoul E-Land FC	10	(3)
2024	Suwon Samsung Bluewings	14	(1)
2025	Macarthur FC	5	(0)
2025–2026	Cong An Ho Chi Minh City	21	(3)
2026–	Selangor	2	(0)

International career
2013	Australia U20	1	(1)
- * Club domestic league appearances and goals as of 7 June 2026

Peter Makrillos (born 4 September 1995) is an Australian professional soccer player who plays as a central midfielder for Malaysia Super League club Selangor.

== Early life ==
Makrillos was born in Sydney, New South Wales, Australia to parents of Greek descent. His grandparents migrated to Australia from Kalymnos and Tripoli, Greece in 1965. Raised in Belmore, in Greater Western Sydney, Makrillos played football for APIA Leichhardt, Blacktown City, and Sutherland Sharks. He trialled three months for FC Barcelona in La Masia, after impressing in a youth tournament, and spent six years in the youth section of Premier League club Stoke City until 2014.

== Club career ==
Makrillos returned to Australia from England in 2016. He signed for Rockdale City Suns and Sydney Olympic in the National Premier Leagues NSW.

On 11 January 2018, he signed a three-and-a-half-year contract with Greek Super League club Panionios for an undisclosed fee. He departed the club after one season, recording two assists in 15 games, due to the financial issues at the club. On 18 February 2022, Makrillos joined Danish 1st Division club FC Fredericia on a deal for the rest of the season. On 30 May 2022, the club confirmed that Makrillos was one out five players who would leave the club, as their contracts expired.

On 1 January 2024, Makrillos joined K League 2 club Seoul E-Land FC after departing from Chungbuk Cheongju in the same league.

On 21 June 2024, he was traded with Kazuki Kozuka and moved to Suwon Samsung Bluewings.

On 29 January 2025, Makrillos had the opportunity to play professional football in his homeland for the first time having signed for Macarthur FC.

== Career statistics ==
As of 16 July 2026

Appearances and goals by club, season and competition
Club	Season	League			National Cup (Note: Includes Greek Cup, Suomen Cup, Bulgarian Cup, Korean FA Cup, Australia Cup, Vietnamese Cup, Malaysia FA Cup)		League Cup (Note: Includes Malaysia Cup)		Total	
Club	Season	Division	Apps	Goals	Apps	Goals	Apps	Goals	Apps	Goals
Newcastle Town	2015–16	Northern Premier League	12	1	–		–		12	1
Rockdale City	2016	NPL NSW	23	4	–		–		23	4
Sydney Olympic	2017	NPL NSW	7	0	–		–		7	0
Panionios	2017–18	Super League Greece	7	0	1	0	–		8	0
Panionios	2018–19	Super League Greece	4	0	3	0	–		7	0
Panionios	Total		11	0	4	0	0	0	15	0
IFK Mariehamn	2020	Veikkausliiga	19	4	3	1	–		22	5
Slavia Sofia	2020–21	Bulgarian First League	15	7	4	1	–		19	8
Slavia Sofia	2021–22	Bulgarian First League	18	2	2	1	–		20	3
Slavia Sofia	Total		33	9	6	2	0	0	39	11
Fredericia	2021–22	Danish 1st Division	13	1	–		–		13	1
GIF Sundsvall	2022	Allsvenskan	11	1	–		–		11	1
Chungbuk Cheongju	2023	K League 2	32	7	1	0	–		33	7
Seoul E-Land FC	2024	K League 2	10	0	1	0	–		11	0
Suwon Samsung Bluewings	2024	K League 2	14	1	–		–		14	1
Macarthur FC	2024–25	A-League	7	0	0	0	–		7	0
Cong An Ho Chi Minh City	2025–26	V.League 1	21	3	2	0	–		23	3
Selangor	2026–27	Malaysia Super League	0	0	0	0	0	0	0	0
Career total			213	31	17	3	0	0	230	34

== Honours ==
Cong An Ho Chi Minh City

- Vietnamese Cup: 2025–26
