= Eduardo Sosa =

Venezuelan footballer (born 1996)

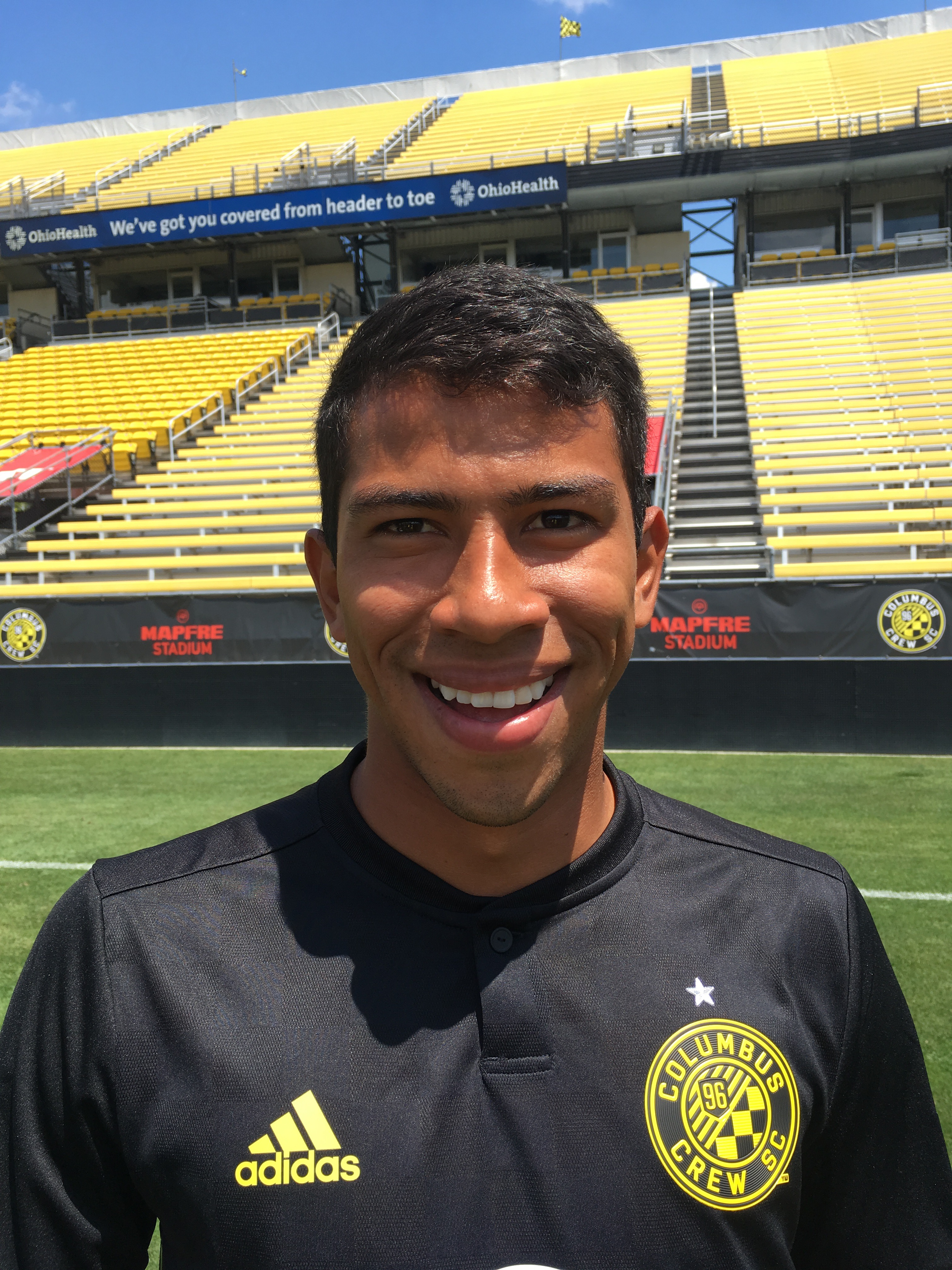
- Sosa in 2018

Personal information
- Full name: Eduardo José Sosa Vegas
- Date of birth: 20 June 1996 (age 30)
- Place of birth: Barinas, Barinas, Venezuela
- Height: 1.71 m (5 ft 7 in)
- Position: Midfielder

Team information
- Current team: Selangor
- Number: 10

Youth career
- EFM La Floresta
- Zamora

Senior career*
Years	Team	Apps	(Gls)
2013–2018	Zamora	48	(6)
2018–2019	Columbus Crew	18	(1)
2020	Fort Lauderdale	12	(3)
2021–2022	Jaguares de Córdoba	28	(4)
2022	→ Millonarios (loan)	21	(2)
2022–2024	Deportes Tolima	51	(2)
2025–2026	Immigration	19	(10)
2026–	Selangor	0	(0)
- * Club domestic league appearances and goals as of 1 July 2026

Eduardo José Sosa Vegas (born 20 June 1996) is a Venezuelan professional footballer who is currently playing for Malaysia Super League club Selangor.

== Career ==
=== Zamora ===
Sosa made his professional debut with Zamora on 10 November 2013, before making over 59 appearances, scoring 8 goals and tallying 6 assists in all competitions for the club.

=== Columbus Crew ===
Sosa signed with Major League Soccer side Columbus Crew on 9 January 2018. He scored his first goal for the club in a 2–1 win over Real Salt Lake on 1 July 2018. Columbus opted not to renew his contract at the end of the 2019 season.

=== Fort Lauderdale ===
In Fort Lauderdale's inaugural season in the USL League One, Sosa was named in the USL League One All-League First team, reflecting his immense talent and ability for the team.

=== Jaguares de Córdoba ===
Following the suspension of USL League One in 2021 due to the Coronavirus pandemic, in search of more playing time, Sosa signed for Jaguares de Córdoba in the Colombian First Division. He scored 4 goals in 28 games for the club.

==== Millonarios (loan) ====
On 17 January 2022, Jaguares de Córdoba confirmed the transfer of Sosa to Millonarios on a year-long loan, with an option to buy. On 13 February, he scored his first goal for the club in a 2-0 win against Deportivo Cali.

=== Deportes Tolima ===
On 14 July 2022, in a swap deal, Sosa was signed by Deportes Tolima on a 2.5-year contract, while Daniel Cataño was loaned out to Millonarios with an option to buy after a year. He was assigned the number 8 jersey.

On 15 March 2023, for the second matchday in a row, after defeating La Equidad, Sosa was awarded the Man of the Match Award, exemplifying his excellent start to his new club. On 21 July of the same year, after being introduced from the bench in the 67th minute, Sosa scored a stunning goal which resulted in a 3-1 win against Once Caldas. This was his 10th match of the season, having played 388 minutes of football.

=== Immigration FC ===
On 6 August 2025, following Immigration FC's promotion to the Malaysia Super League, Sosa signed for the club as its second foreign player. He helped the club avoid relegation and secure a record-high sixth-place finish in its first season in the Malaysian top flight.

=== Selangor FC ===
On 1 July 2026, Sosa became the fifth player signed by Selangor in the 2026 Malaysia Super League summer transfer window.

== Career statistics ==
=== Club ===
As of as of matches played on 25 May 2026

Appearances and goals by club, season and competition
Club	Season	League			National cup		Continental		Total	
Club	Season	Division	Apps	Goals	Apps	Goals	Apps	Goals	Apps	Goals
Zamora	2013-14	Venezuelan Primera División	1	0	—		—		1	0
Zamora	2014-15	Venezuelan Primera División	4	0	—		—		4	0
Zamora	2015	Venezuelan Primera División	1	0	—		0	0	1	0
Zamora	2016	Venezuelan Primera División	8	0	0	0	0	0	8	0
Zamora	2017	Venezuelan Primera División	34	6	7	1	5 (Note: Appearance(s) in Copa Libertadores)	1	46	8
Zamora	Total		48	6	7	1	5	1	60	8
Columbus Crew	2018	MLS	10	1	1	0	—		11	1
Columbus Crew	2019	MLS	8	0	—		—		8	0
Columbus Crew	Total		18	1	1	0	—		19	1
Fort Lauderdale	2020	USL League One	12	3	—		—		12	3
Jaguares de Córdoba	2021	Categoría Primera A	28	4	1	0	—		29	4
Millonarios (loan)	2022	Categoría Primera A	21	2	1	0	1	1	23	3
Deportes Tolima	2022	Categoría Primera A	17	1	1	0	—		18	1
Deportes Tolima	2023	Categoría Primera A	21	1	1	0	2 (Note: Appearance(s) in Copa Sudamericana)	0	24	1
Deportes Tolima	2024	Categoría Primera A	13	0	—		0	0	13	0
Deportes Tolima	Total		51	2	2	0	2	0	55	2
Immigration	2025–26	Malaysia Super League	19	10	5	1	—		24	11
Selangor	2026–27	Malaysia Super League	0	0	0	0	—		0	0
Career Total			197	28	17	2	8	2	222	32

== Honours ==
=== Millonarios ===
- Copa Colombia: 2022
