= Enzo Célestine =

French footballer (born 1997)

Personal information
- Full name: Enzo Nicolás Jacques Célestine
- Date of birth: 24 July 1997 (age 29)
- Place of birth: Paris, France
- Height: 1.90 m (6 ft 3 in)
- Position: Forward

Team information
- Current team: Kelantan TRW

Youth career
- –2016: Auxerre

Senior career*
Years	Team	Apps	(Gls)
2016–2017	Martigues	21	(2)
2017–2018	Saint-Louis Neuweg	22	(2)
2018–2019	Pontarlier	6	(0)
2019	Walhain	8	(6)
2019–2020	Visé	10	(0)
2020	Tubize-Braine	5	(0)
2021	Giugliano	16	(1)
2021	Hyères	8	(1)
2021–2022	Sète 34	20	(4)
2022–2023	Argeș Pitești	8	(0)
2023–2024	Persipura Jayapura	18	(5)
2024–2025	Persibo Bojonegoro	18	(9)
2025	Persikad Depok	11	(6)
2026–	Kelantan TRW	2	(2)
- * Club domestic league appearances and goals as of 24 November 2025

Enzo Nicolás Jacques Célestine (born 24 July 1997) is a French professional footballer who plays as a forward for Malaysia Super League club Kelantan TRW.

== Club career ==
Célestine started his career in France at Martigues, then playing for Saint-Louis Neuweg and Pontarlier, before signing a contract in Belgium, with Visé. After he left Visé, remained in Belgium and signed for Tubize-Braine, before moving back in France, where he played for teams such as Hyères and Sète 34.

=== Argeș Pitești ===
In the summer of 2022, Célestine signed a contract with Romanian top-flight club Argeș Pitești.

=== Persipura Jayapura ===
In September 2023, Célestine decided to join Indonesian club Persipura Jayapura.

=== Persibo Bojonegoro ===
In August 2024, he officially signed a contract with Persibo Bojonegoro. He was brought in during the initial transfer window of the 2024–25 Liga 2 season.

=== Persikad Depok ===
On 25 August 2025, Championship club Persikad Depok announced the signing of Célestine.

== Personal life ==
Célestine's brother, Julien Célestine, is also a professional footballer.

On 29 June 2024, Célestine officially married a girl from Parigi Moutong Regency, Central Sulawesi, Marsyanda. Marsyanda and Célestine's wedding reception took place according to Islamic law in Bajo village.
