= Kay Tejan =

Dutch footballer (born 1997)

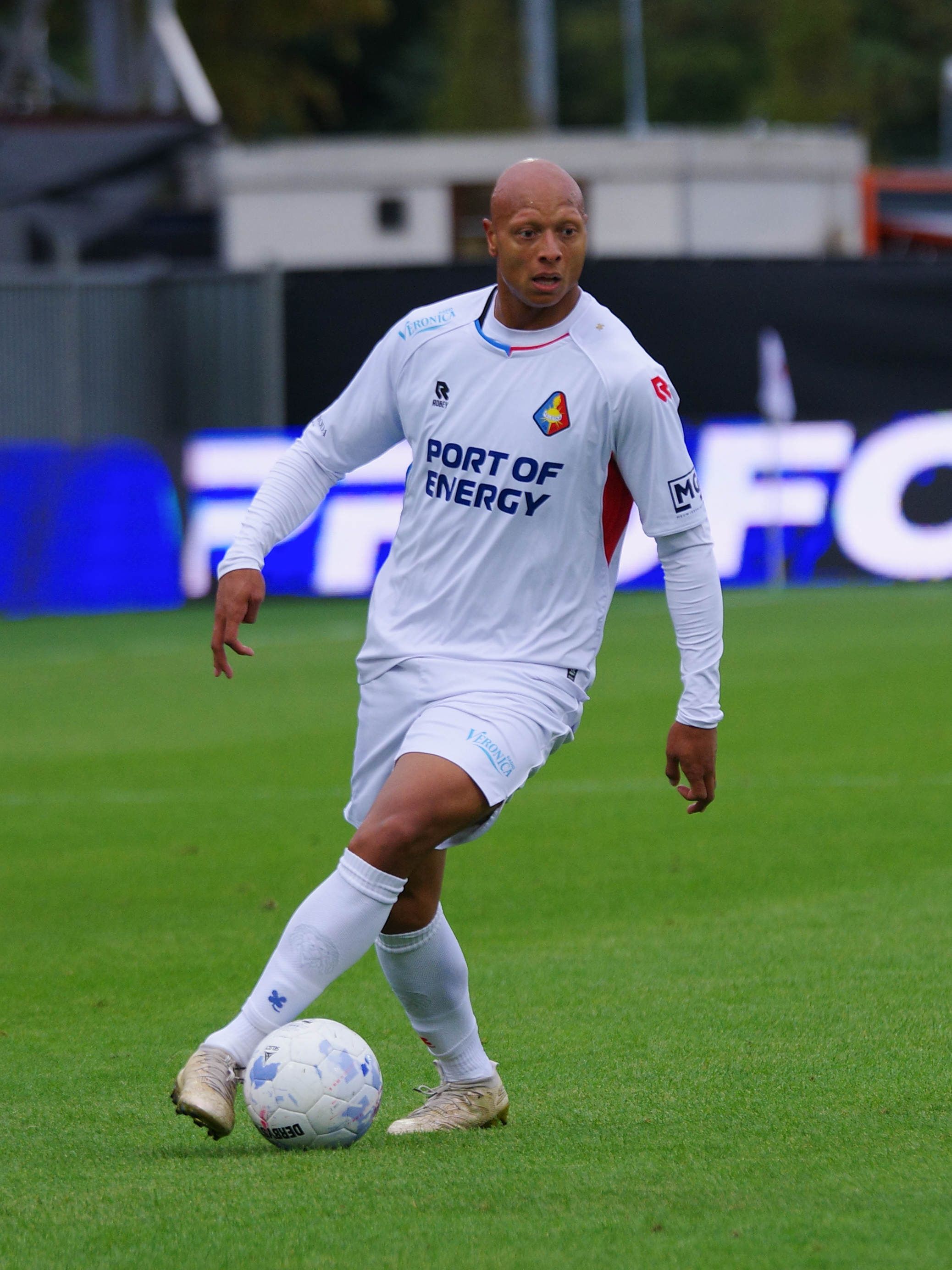
- Tejan with Telstar in 2025

Personal information
- Full name: Kay Sheku Tejan
- Date of birth: 3 February 1997 (age 29)
- Place of birth: Amsterdam, Netherlands
- Height: 1.87 m (6 ft 2 in)
- Positions: Striker; winger

Team information
- Current team: Selangor
- Number: 11

Youth career
- –2015: DWS
- 2015–2016: AFC

Senior career*
Years	Team	Apps	(Gls)
2016–2018	Jong FC Volendam	54	(10)
2018	FC Volendam	2	(0)
2018–2019	Quick Boys	30	(19)
2019–2021	Kozakken Boys	26	(8)
2021	Quick Boys	0	(0)
2021–2023	TOP Oss	49	(17)
2022	→ Sheriff Tiraspol (loan)	8	(1)
2023–2024	ŁKS Łódź	30	(7)
2024–2025	Dunkerque	31	(2)
2025–2026	Telstar	28	(3)
2026–	Selangor	2	(1)
- * Club domestic league appearances and goals as of 21:34, 17 May 2026 (UTC)

Kay Sheku Tejan (born 3 February 1997) is a Dutch professional footballer who plays as a striker for Malaysia Super League club Selangor.

An Amsterdam native, Tejan came through the youth ranks at DWS and AFC before making his senior debut for FC Volendam. He later scored regularly in the lower Dutch tiers with Quick Boys and Kozakken Boys, earned a move to TOP Oss, and spent time abroad with Moldovan side Sheriff Tiraspol on loan, ŁKS Łódź in Poland and USL Dunkerque in France. He joined Telstar in August 2025, made his Eredivisie debut later that month, and scored his first top-flight goal in September.

== Career ==
=== Volendam ===
Born in Amsterdam, Tejan played in the youth departments of DWS and AFC, after which he moved to FC Volendam in 2016. There, he played two seasons in the second team, Jong FC Volendam, competing in the Derde Divisie. On 2 February 2018, he made his professional debut in the first team of Volendam in a 2–0 home win over Fortuna Sittard, coming on as a late substitute for Luís Pedro. Two months later, he played his second and last game for Volendam, a 4–1 win over Jong AZ where he also appeared as a substitute.

=== Quick Boys and Kozakken Boys ===
In 2018, Tejan signed with Quick Boys, where he grew into a proven goal scorer, netting nineteen times during the 2018–19 season in the Derde Divisie. After the season, he moved to Kozakken Boys competing in the Tweede Divisie, where he scored eight goals through two seasons.

=== TOP Oss and loan to Sheriff ===
On 23 January 2021, Quick Boys announced that Tejan would return to the club from the start of the 2021–22 season. Before he could make an official appearance for the club however, he signed with Eerste Divisie club TOP Oss, penning a contract on 1 August 2021 after a successful trial.

Tejan joined Moldovan Super Liga club Sheriff Tiraspol on 19 July 2022. He made his competitive debut for the club the same day, coming off the bench in the second half of the UEFA Champions League qualifier against Maribor for Momo Yansané. The transfer was a loan until 31 December 2022, with an option to buy. He scored his first goal for the club on 21 August in a 3–0 away win in the league over CSF Bălți, exploiting an error by opposing goalkeeper Victor Străistari. Tejan returned to TOP on 1 January 2023.

=== ŁKS ===
On 3 July 2023, Tejan signed a two-year contract with recently promoted Polish Ekstraklasa side ŁKS Łódź. He became the first ever Dutch player to represent the team. On 21 July, he made his competitive debut for the club on the first matchday of the season, starting in 3–0 defeat to Legia Warsaw. He scored his first goal for Rycerze Wiosny on 26 August, equalising shortly after the break in an eventual 2–1 loss to fellow promoted side Puszcza Niepołomice.

=== Dunkerque ===
On 28 July 2024, ŁKS Łódź announced it had reached an agreement with Dunkerque for Tejan's transfer. Later that day, he signed a two-year contract, with an option for a further year, with the Ligue 2 club.

=== Telstar ===
On 29 August 2025, Tejan returned to the Netherlands, signing a two-year deal with newly promoted Telstar. He debuted the next day, coming on after 60 minutes for Soufiane Hetli in a 2–0 away win over defending champions PSV; Telstar's first top-flight victory since 1978. On 28 September, he scored his first Telstar and Eredivisie goal, opening the scoring in a 4–2 home win over Go Ahead Eagles.

=== Selangor ===
On 13 August 2026, Tejan joined Malaysia Super League club Selangor.

== Personal life ==
Born in the Netherlands, Tejan is of Jamaican descent through his father. He was diagnosed with alopecia areata since the age of 16.

== Career statistics ==
As of match played 17 May 2026

Appearances and goals by club, season and competition
Club	Season	League			National cup (Note: Includes KNVB Cup, Moldovan Cup, Polish Cup, Coupe de France, Malaysia FA Cup)		Europe		Other		Total	
Club	Season	Division	Apps	Goals	Apps	Goals	Apps	Goals	Apps	Goals	Apps	Goals
Jong FC Volendam	2016–17	Derde Divisie	25	4	—		—		—		25	4
Jong FC Volendam	2017–18	Derde Divisie	29	6	—		—		2 (Note: Appearances in Derde Divisie promotion play-offs)	0	27	4
Jong FC Volendam	Total		54	10	—		—		2	0	56	10
FC Volendam	2017–18	Eerste Divisie	2	0	0	0	—		—		2	0
Quick Boys	2018–19	Derde Divisie	30	19	1	0	—		4	3	35	22
Kozakken Boys	2019–20	Tweede Divisie	22	6	0	0	—		—		22	6
Kozakken Boys	2020–21	Tweede Divisie	4	2	1	0	—		—		5	2
Kozakken Boys	Total		26	8	1	0	—		—		27	8
TOP Oss	2021–22	Eerste Divisie	36	14	1	0	—		—		37	14
TOP Oss	2022–23	Eerste Divisie	14	3	0	0	—		—		14	3
TOP Oss	Total		50	17	1	0	—		—		51	17
Sheriff Tiraspol (loan)	2022–23	Moldovan Super Liga	8	1	1	0	6 (Note: Four appearances in UEFA Champions League, two appearances in UEFA Europa League)	0	—		15	1
ŁKS Łódź	2023–24	Ekstraklasa	30	7	1	0	—		—		31	7
Dunkerque	2024–25	Ligue 2	28	2	6	1	—		0	0	34	3
Dunkerque	2025–26	Ligue 2	3	0	0	0	—		—		3	0
Dunkerque	Total		31	2	6	1	—		—		37	3
Telstar	2025–26	Eredivisie	28	3	4	1	—		—		32	4
Selangor	2026–27	Malaysia Super League	0	0	0	0	—		0 (Note: Appearances in Malaysia Cup)	0	0	0
Career total			259	67	15	2	6	0	6	3	286	72
