= Douglas Oliveira =

Brazilian footballer (born 1995)

Personal information
- Full name: Douglas Felisbino de Oliveira
- Date of birth: 16 January 1995 (age 31)
- Place of birth: São Paulo, Brazil
- Height: 1.88 m (6 ft 2 in)
- Position: Forward

Team information
- Current team: Star City F.C.
- Number: 97

Youth career
- –2014: Coritiba

Senior career*
Years	Team	Apps	(Gls)
2014–2017	Coritiba	3	(0)
2015	→ Maringá (loan)	1	(0)
2016	→ Rio Branco (loan)	6	(2)
2016	→ Almirante Barroso (loan)	10	(5)
2017	→ Pelotas (loan)	4	(0)
2017	Concórdia	4	(0)
2017	Costa Rica	0	(0)
2018	Itaboraí	22	(5)
2018–2019	Goytacaz	9	(1)
2019	Marcílio Dias	5	(0)
2019–2020	Luverdense	15	(6)
2019	→ Almirante Barroso (loan)	6	(1)
2020	→ Consadole Sapporo (loan)	26	(2)
2021–2024	Consadole Sapporo	28	(3)
2023–2024	→ Iwate Grulla Morioka (loan)	23	(0)
2024	Rio Branco	4	(0)
2024–2025	São José	11	(5)
- * Club domestic league appearances and goals as of August 2026

Douglas Felisbino de Oliveira (born 16 January 1995) is a Brazilian professional footballer who plays as a forward.
