= Moses Atede =

Bahraini footballer (born 1997)

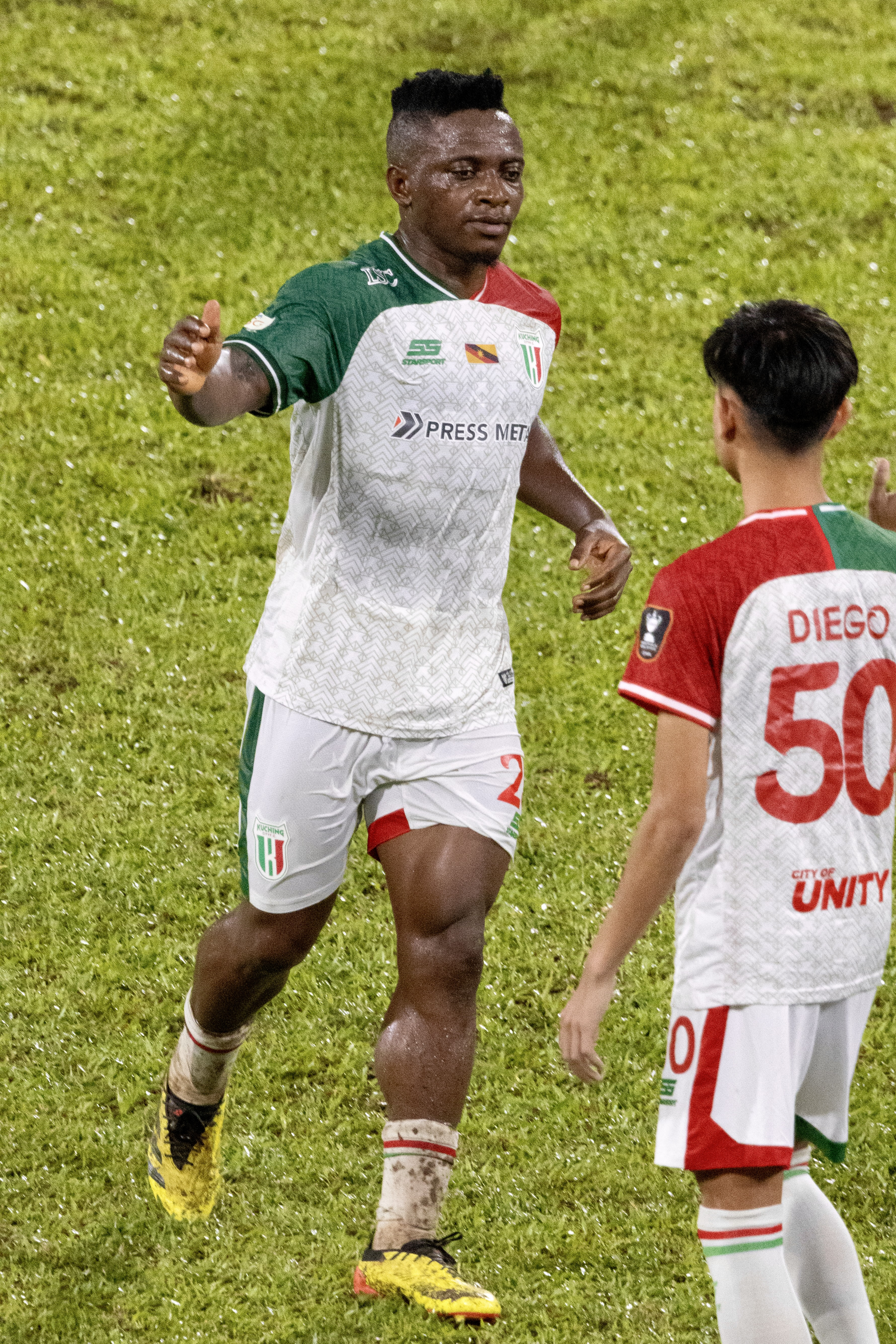
- Atede with Kuching City in 2025

Personal information
- Birth name: Moses Atede Jona Atuluku
- Date of birth: December 17, 1997 (age 28)
- Place of birth: Kaduna, Nigeria
- Height: 1.65 m (5 ft 5 in)
- Position: Defensive midfielder

Team information
- Current team: Star City FC

Youth career
- Tumooh

Senior career*
Years	Team	Apps	(Gls)
2018–2021	Al-Hidd	2	(0)
2021–2023	Al-Muharraq	3	(1)
2023	Kedah Darul Aman	10	(1)
2024	Sitra Club		
2024–2026	Kuching City FC	51	(0)
2026-	Star City FC		

International career
2023–2024	Bahrain	8	(0)
- * Club domestic league appearances and goals as of 14 March 2026

Moses Atede Jona (Arabic: موزيس أتيدي جونا; born 17 December 1997) is a professional footballer who plays as a defensive midfielder for Malaysian Super League club Star City F.C. Born in Nigeria, he plays for the Bahrain national team as a central midfielder.

== Club career ==
=== Al Hidd ===
Atede began his senior career in the Bahraini Premier League with Al-Hidd in 2018. In his second season at the club, he won the 2019–20 Bahraini Premier League title.

=== Al Muharraq ===
In July 2021, Atede moved to Al-Muharraq where he scored a goal in a 3–0 win during the 2021 AFC Cup quarter-finals against Lebanon club Al-Ahed. Atede helped the club to win the 2021 AFC Cup after a 3–0 win over Iranian club Nasaf Qarshi.

=== Kedah Darul Aman ===
On 5 July 2023, Atede moved to the Malaysia Super League club with Kedah Darul Aman. He make his debut for the club on 9 July in a 2–0 win over PDRM. On 22 August, Atede put on a 'man of the match' performance where he assisted Fadzrul Danel in the 7th minute to open up the account against Penang. Atede then scored in the 90+5th injury time to secure a 2–1 league win.

=== Sitra Club ===
In January 2024, Atede move back to Bahrain to join Sitra Club.

=== Kuching City ===
On 19 September 2024, Atede returned to Malaysia to joined Kuching City. He make his debut for the club on 27 September in a 2–1 away lost to Johor Darul Ta'zim.

== International career ==
Born in Nigeria, Atede was naturalized as Bahraini and holds dual-citizenship. He debuted for the Bahrain national team in a 1–0 friendly win over Philippines. Atede was called up to the national team for the 2023 AFC Asian Cup where he make three appearances in the competition against South Korea, Malaysia and Japan.

== Honours ==
Al-Hidd

- Bahraini Premier League: 2019–20

Al-Muharraq

- AFC Cup: 2021
- Bahraini FA Cup: 2022
