= Sultan Ibrahim Stadium =

Football Stadium in Johor

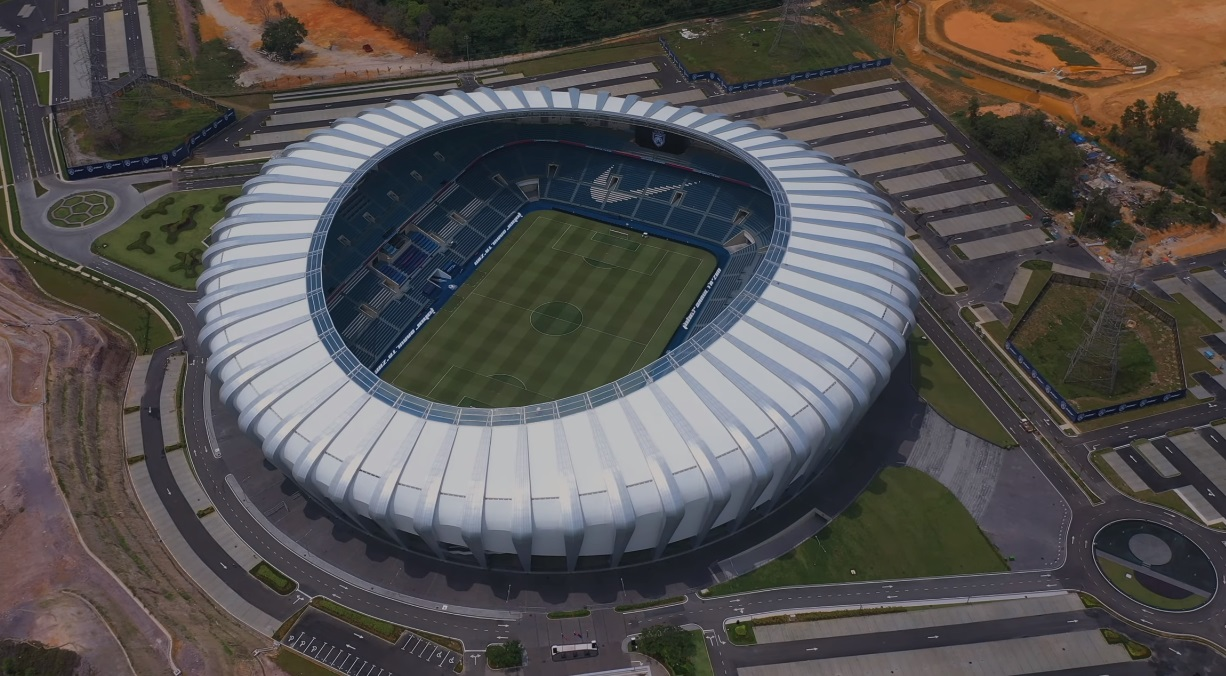
- Aerial view of the stadium
- Interactive map of Sultan Ibrahim Stadium
- Full name: Stadium Sultan Ibrahim
- Location: Iskandar Puteri, Johor, Malaysia
- Coordinates: 1.481513°N 103.619120°E
- Owner: Johor Darul Ta'zim
- Capacity: 40,000
- Executive suites: 10
- Surface: Grass

Construction
- Groundbreaking: 30 January 2016; 10 years ago
- Opened: 22 February 2020; 6 years ago
- Cost: MYR 200 million
- Architects: Saadon Architect, Beijing Institute of Architectural Design
- Project manager: CGPV Industrial Building System Sdn Bhd
- Structural engineer: Haikal Jurutera Perunding Sdn Bhd
- Services engineers: Jurutera Perunding FRM Sdn Bhd (M&E), Pakatan Ukur Bahan Sdn Bhd (QS)
- General contractor: Shanghai Baoye Group (Malaysia) Sdn Bhd

Tenant
- Johor Darul Ta'zim (2020–present)

The Sultan Ibrahim Stadium is a football stadium in Iskandar Puteri, Johor, Malaysia. It is named in honor of the state's current ruler, Sultan Ibrahim ibni Almarhum Sultan Iskandar.

As the new home of Johor Darul Ta'zim of the Malaysia Super League since 2020, the stadium replaced Larkin Stadium which had housed the current team and all previous Johor football teams since 1964. The total cost of the construction was estimated at MYR 200 million. The stadium, with a capacity for 40,000 spectators, opened on 22 February 2020.

== Design ==
Inspired by the banana leaf, the final concept and design was unveiled by Tunku Ismail Idris in a ceremony held in Iskandar Puteri, Johor. The stadium spans at 140,000 square meters with a total built area of 70,000 square meters and can accommodate up to 40,000 people. Red, blue and white LEDs (colours of the Johor flag) are installed outside the stadium for night time illumination. The stadium also includes the club's headquarters, training centre and a megastore.

An integral wind tunnel testing for the stadium's design was conducted by Guangdong Provincial Academy of Building Research Group, a subsidiary of Guangdong Construction Engineering Group Co Ltd.

== Construction ==
With the cost of the construction of a new stadium estimated at MYR 200 million, the Sultan of Johor granted the funds needed for the construction.

Country Garden Pacificview Sdn Bhd has been selected to build the stadium.

In January 2017, the club announced that construction had been delayed by several months, with completion expected between July and the end of 2018 following adjustments made by Tunku Ismail on the stadium's location and technical and design changes.
