= 2026 Malaysia Cup knockout stage =

Football competition

The 2026 Malaysia Cup knockout stage expected began on 17 January 2026 and concluded on 23 May 2026 with the final at Bukit Jalil National Stadium in Kuala Lumpur, to decide the champions of the 2026 Malaysia Cup. A total of 16 teams competed in the knockout phase.

== Qualified teams ==
The seeded teams were drawn against the unseeded teams, with the seeded teams become hosting for the second leg of round of 16.

For the draw, the teams were seeded and unseeded into two pots based on the following principles (introduced starting this season). The results seeding will be determined after the first round of Super League and A1 Semi-Pro League matches:

- Pot A contained the top 8 teams from 2025–26 Super League.
- Pot B contained the 9th until 13th placed teams from 2025–26 Super League, and the 3 teams selected from 2025–26 A1 Semi-Pro League, based on subject approval from the MFL Board of Directors.

Key to colours
Teams from 2024–25 Malaysia Super League
Teams from 2024–25 Malaysia A1 Semi-Pro League

Pot A (seeded)
Rank	Team
1	Johor Darul Ta'zim
2	Kuching City
3	Selangor
4	Kuala Lumpur City
5	Terengganu
6	Negeri Sembilan
7	(Brunei) DPMM
8	Sabah

Pot B (unseeded)
Rank	Team
9	Immigration
10	Kelantan The Real Warriors
11	Penang
12	Melaka
13	PDRM
14	Perak
15	UM-Damansara United
16	Kelantan Red Warrior

== Format ==
Each tie in the knockout phase, apart from the final, was played over two legs, with each team playing one leg at home. The team that scored more goals on aggregate over the two legs advanced to the next round. If the aggregate score was level, then 30 minutes of extra time were played (the away goals rule was not applied). If the score was still level at the end of extra time, the winners were decided by a penalty shoot-out. In the final, which was played as a single match, if the score was level at the end of normal time, extra time was played, followed by a penalty shoot-out if the score was still level.

The mechanism of the draws for each round was as follows:

- The seeded teams were drawn against the unseeded teams, with the seeded teams hosting the second leg.
- In the draws for the quarter-finals onwards, there were no seedings.

== Schedule ==
The draw for the 2026 Malaysia Cup was held on 2 January 2026.

Phase	Round	First leg	Second leg
Knockout phase	Round of 16	17–19 January 2026	22–25 January 2026
Knockout phase	Quarter-finals	6–8 & 13 February 2026	14–15 & 25 February 2026
Knockout phase	Semi-finals	3 & 5 April 2026	7 & 18 April 2026
Knockout phase	Final	23 May 2026 at Bukit Jalil National Stadium, Kuala Lumpur	

== Bracket ==
The bracket was decided after the draw.

Round of 16
UM-Damansara United	0	0	0
Terengganu	2	5	7
Perak	2	0	2
Kuala Lumpur City (a.e.t.)	0	3	3
PDRM	1	0	1
Johor Darul Ta'zim	10	1	11
Melaka	2	3	5
Sabah	2	0	2
Immigration	0	0	0
Negeri Sembilan	0	1	1
Kelantan The Real Warriors	1	0	1
Selangor	2	3	5
Kelantan Red Warrior	0	1	1
(Brunei) DPMM	2	1	3
Penang	1	0	1
Kuching City	0	2	2

Quarter-finals
Terengganu	1	1	2
Kuala Lumpur City	1	2	3
Johor Darul Ta'zim	5	3	8
Melaka	0	1	1
Negeri Sembilan	0	1	1
Selangor	1	5	6
(Brunei) DPMM	1	1	2
Kuching City	3	3	6

Semi-finals
Kuala Lumpur City	0	1	1
Johor Darul Ta'zim	4	4	8
Selangor	1	0	1
Kuching City	1	1	2

Final
Johor Darul Ta'zim	2
Kuching City	0

== Round of 16 ==
The first legs were played on 17, 18 and 19 January, and the second legs were played on 22, 23, 24 and 25 January 2026. The losers were transferred to the MFL Challenge Cup.

Team 1	Agg.	Team 2	1st leg	2nd leg
Immigration	0–1	Negeri Sembilan	0–0	0–1
Melaka	5–2	Sabah	2–2	3–0
Kelantan Red Warrior	1–3	(Brunei) DPMM	0–2	1–1
Penang	1–2	Kuching City	1–0	0–2
PDRM	1–11	Johor Darul Ta'zim	1–10	0–1
Perak	2–3	Kuala Lumpur City	2–0	0–3 (a.e.t.)
UM-Damansara United	0–7	Terengganu	0–2	0–5
Kelantan The Real Warriors	1–5	Selangor	1–2	0–3

=== Matches ===
First leg

17 January 2026
17:00 UTC+8

Immigration	0–0	Negeri Sembilan
	Report (FAM); Report (MFL)

Penang State Stadium, Batu Kawan
Attendance: 344
Referee: Kamal Ikhwan Yaacob

Second leg

25 January 2026
21:00 UTC+8

Negeri Sembilan	1–0	Immigration
Luqman 62'	Report (FAM); Report (MFL)

Tuanku Abdul Rahman Stadium, Paroi
Attendance: TBC
Referee: Tuan Mohd Yaasin

Negeri Sembilan won 1–0 on aggregate.

First leg

17 January 2026
20:15 UTC+8

Melaka	2–2	Sabah
Shahrel 3'; Park 37'	Report (FAM); Report (MFL)	Mujagić 15'; Tierney 88'

Hang Jebat Stadium, Krubong
Attendance: 977
Referee: Khairulsyahmi Ahmad Khalidi

Second leg

22 January 2026 (Note: The match was originally scheduled for 25 January 2026.)
19:30 UTC+8

Sabah	0–3	Melaka
	Report (FAM); Report (MFL)	Shamsaldin 49', 87'; Che Rashid 85'

Likas Stadium, Kota Kinabalu
Attendance: TBC
Referee: Faizudin Ismail

Melaka won 5–2 on aggregate.

First leg

17 January 2026
21:00 UTC+8

Kelantan Red Warrior	0–2	(Brunei) DPMM
	Report (FAM); Report (MFL)	Ramadhan 31'; Syafiq 90+4'

Sultan Muhammad IV Stadium, Kota Bharu
Attendance: 2,449
Referee: Kamil Zakaria

Second leg

24 January 2026
20:00 UTC+8

DPMM (Brunei)	1–1	Kelantan Red Warrior
Hakeme 11'	Report (FAM); Report (MFL)	Latiff 8'

Hassanal Bolkiah National Stadium, Bandar Seri Begawan
Attendance: TBC
Referee: Ahmad Zuhadi Dzulkifli

DPMM won 3–1 on aggregate.

First leg

18 January 2026
17:00 UTC+8

Penang	1–0	Kuching City
D. Coutinho 40'	Report (FAM); Report (MFL)

City Stadium, George Town
Attendance: 969
Referee: Faizudin Ismail

Second leg

24 January 2026
19:30 UTC+8

Kuching City	2–0	Penang
G. Nistelrooy 45+2'; R. Ngah 45+3'	Report (FAM); Report (MFL)

Sarawak State Stadium, Kuching
Attendance: TBC
Referee: Zamzaidi Katimin

Kuching City won 2–1 on aggregate.

First leg

18 January 2026
17:30 UTC+8

PDRM	1–10	Johor Darul Ta'zim
Imran 60'	Report (FAM); Report (MFL)	Teto 3', 7', 50', 64', 73', 90+4'; Nazmi 48'; M. Guilherme 66', 90'; Hidalgo 87'

Sultan Ibrahim Stadium, Iskandar Puteri (Note: PDRM played their home matches at Sultan Ibrahim Stadium, Iskandar Puteri, instead of their regular home stadium Selayang Municipal Council Stadium, Selayang.)
Attendance: 7,976
Referee: Izzul Fikri

Second leg

24 January 2026
17:30 UTC+8

Johor Darul Ta'zim	1–0	PDRM
Teto 66'	Report (FAM); Report (MFL)

Sultan Ibrahim Stadium, Iskandar Puteri
Attendance: TBC
Referee: Firdaus Dahlan

Johor Darul Ta'zim won 11–1 on aggregate.

First leg

18 January 2026
20:15 UTC+8

Perak	2–0	Kuala Lumpur City
Daniel Hakimi 10'; Fadhil 54'	Report (FAM); Report (MFL)

Manjung Municipal Council Stadium, Seri Manjung
Attendance: 4,005
Referee: Nazmi Nasaruddin

Second leg

25 January 2026
17:00 UTC+8

Kuala Lumpur City	3–0 (a.e.t.)	Perak
Safawi 56' (pen.); Josué 90'; Cardoso 105+1'	Report (FAM); Report (MFL)

Kuala Lumpur Stadium, Cheras
Attendance: TBC
Referee: Razlan Joffri Ali

Kuala Lumpur City won 3–2 on aggregate.

First leg

19 January 2026
17:00 UTC+8

UM-Damansara United	0–2	Terengganu
	Report (FAM); Report (MFL)	Careca 5'; Shivan 78' (o.g.)

UM Arena Stadium, Kuala Lumpur
Attendance: 1,517
Referee: Zamzaidi Katimin

Second leg

23 January 2026
21:00 UTC+8

Terengganu	5–0	UM-Damansara United
Shakir 33', 37', 62'; Careca 45+2', 88'	Report (FAM); Report (MFL)

Sultan Mizan Zainal Abidin Stadium, Kuala Nerus
Attendance: TBC
Referee: Nazmi Nasaruddin

Terengganu won 7–0 on aggregate.

First leg

19 January 2026
21:00 UTC+8

Kelantan The Real Warriors	1–2	Selangor
Lyngbø 25'	Report (FAM); Report (MFL)	Faisal 61', 90+3'

Sultan Muhammad IV Stadium, Kota Bharu
Attendance: 769
Referee: Shukor Zulkiflee

Second leg

23 January 2026
20:15 UTC+8

Selangor	3–0	Kelantan The Real Warriors
Chrigor 19', 66'; Faisal 45+3'	Report (FAM); Report (MFL)

MBPJ Stadium, Petaling Jaya
Attendance: 5,100
Referee: Kamil Zakaria

Selangor won 5–1 on aggregate.

== Quarter-finals ==
The first legs were played on 6, 7, 8 and 13 February, and the second legs were played on 14, 15 and 25 February 2026.

Team 1	Agg.	Team 2	1st leg	2nd leg
Terengganu	2–3	Kuala Lumpur City	1–1	1–2
DPMM (Brunei)	2–6	Kuching City	1–3	1–3
Negeri Sembilan	1–6	Selangor	0–1	1–5
Johor Darul Ta'zim	8–1	Melaka	5–0	3–1

=== Matches ===
First leg

6 February 2026
21:00 UTC+8

Terengganu	1–1	Kuala Lumpur City
Kastaneer 16'	Report (FAM); Report (MFL)	Cardoso 84'

Sultan Mizan Zainal Abidin Stadium, Kuala Nerus
Attendance: TBC
Referee: Zamzaidi Katimin

Second leg

15 February 2026
17:00 UTC+8

Kuala Lumpur City	2–1	Terengganu
V. Ruiz 78'; Josué 90'	Report (FAM); Report (MFL)	Akhyar 21'

Kuala Lumpur Stadium, Cheras
Attendance: TBC
Referee: Razlan Joffri Ali

Kuala Lumpur City won 3–2 on aggregate.

First leg

7 February 2026
20:15 UTC+8

DPMM (Brunei)	1–3	Kuching City
Okwuosa 50' (o.g.)	Report (FAM); Report (MFL)	Etame 39'; Haimie 64' (o.g.); Ramadhan 84'

Hassanal Bolkiah National Stadium, Bandar Seri Begawan
Attendance: TBC
Referee: Afdzal Hilmi

Second leg

14 February 2026
20:15 UTC+8

Kuching City	3–1	(Brunei) DPMM
R. Ngah 28'; Okwuosa 43'; Palmero 69'	Report (FAM); Report (MFL)	Hakeme 52'

Sarawak State Stadium, Kuching
Attendance: TBC
Referee: Faizal Talib

Kuching City won 6–2 on aggregate.

First leg

8 February 2026
21:00 UTC+8

Negeri Sembilan	0–1	Selangor
	Report (FAM); Report (MFL)	Chrigor 90+7' (pen.)

Tuanku Abdul Rahman Stadium, Paroi
Attendance: 9,637
Referee: Tuan Mohd Yaasin

Second leg

14 February 2026
21:00 UTC+8

Selangor	5–1	Negeri Sembilan
Faisal 2'; Fortes 24'; Laine 30'; Cheng 45+2'; Chrigor 66'	Report (FAM); Report (MFL)	Motika 74' (pen.)

MBPJ Stadium, Petaling Jaya
Attendance: 10,015
Referee: Ahmad Zuhadi Dzulkifli

Selangor won 6–1 on aggregate.

First leg

13 February 2026
20:15 UTC+8

Johor Darul Ta'zim	5–0	Melaka
Mujagić 5', 8', 61'; Hidalgo 72'; M. Guilherme 75'	Report (FAM); Report (MFL)

Sultan Ibrahim Stadium, Iskandar Puteri
Attendance: TBC
Referee: Hasrol Amir

Second leg

25 February 2026
22:00 UTC+8

Melaka	1–3	Johor Darul Ta'zim
Shamsaldin 90+2'	Report (FAM); Report (MFL)	Corbin-Ong 7'; Jairo 31', 55'

Hang Jebat Stadium, Krubong
Attendance: TBC
Referee: Izzul Fikri

Johor Darul Ta'zim won 8–1 on aggregate.

== Semi-finals ==
The first legs were played on 3 and 5 April, and the second legs were played on 7 and 18 April 2026.

Team 1	Agg.	Team 2	1st leg	2nd leg
Kuala Lumpur City	1–8	Johor Darul Ta'zim	0–4	1–4
Selangor	1–2	Kuching City	1–1	1–2

=== Matches ===
First leg

3 April 2026
20:15 UTC+8

Kuala Lumpur City	0–4	Johor Darul Ta'zim
	Report (FAM); Report (MFL)	Bérgson 5'; Aketxe 31', 83'; Arribas 59'

Kuala Lumpur Stadium, Cheras
Attendance: 3,235
Referee: Nazmi Nasaruddin

Second leg

7 April 2026
20:15 UTC+8

Johor Darul Ta'zim	4–1	Kuala Lumpur City
Bérgson 49', 58'; Syahmi 52'; Mujagić 89'	Report (FAM); Report (MFL)	Gallifuoco 68'

Sultan Ibrahim Stadium, Iskandar Puteri
Attendance: 9,694
Referee: Hasrol Amir

Johor Darul Ta'zim won 8–1 on aggregate.

First leg

5 April 2026
20:15 UTC+8

Selangor	1–1	Kuching City
Chrigor 90+2'	Report (FAM); Report (MFL)	R. Ngah 42' (pen.)

MBPJ Stadium, Petaling Jaya
Attendance: 7,017
Referee: Izzul Fikri

Second leg

18 April 2026
20:15 UTC+8

Kuching City	1–0	Selangor
Shitembi 30'	Report (FAM); Report (MFL)

Sarawak State Stadium, Kuching
Attendance: 19,855
Referee: Ahmad Zuhadi Dzulkifli

Kuching City won 2–1 on aggregate.

== Final ==
The final was played on 23 May 2026 at the Bukit Jalil National Stadium in Kuala Lumpur.

23 May 2026
21:00 UTC+8

Johor Darul Ta'zim	2–0	Kuching City
M. Guilherme 81'; Arif 90+1'	Report (FAM); Report (MFL)

Bukit Jalil National Stadium, Kuala Lumpur
Attendance: 50,032
Referee: Mohammed Al-Shammari (Qatar)
