= 2026 Malaysia Cup final =

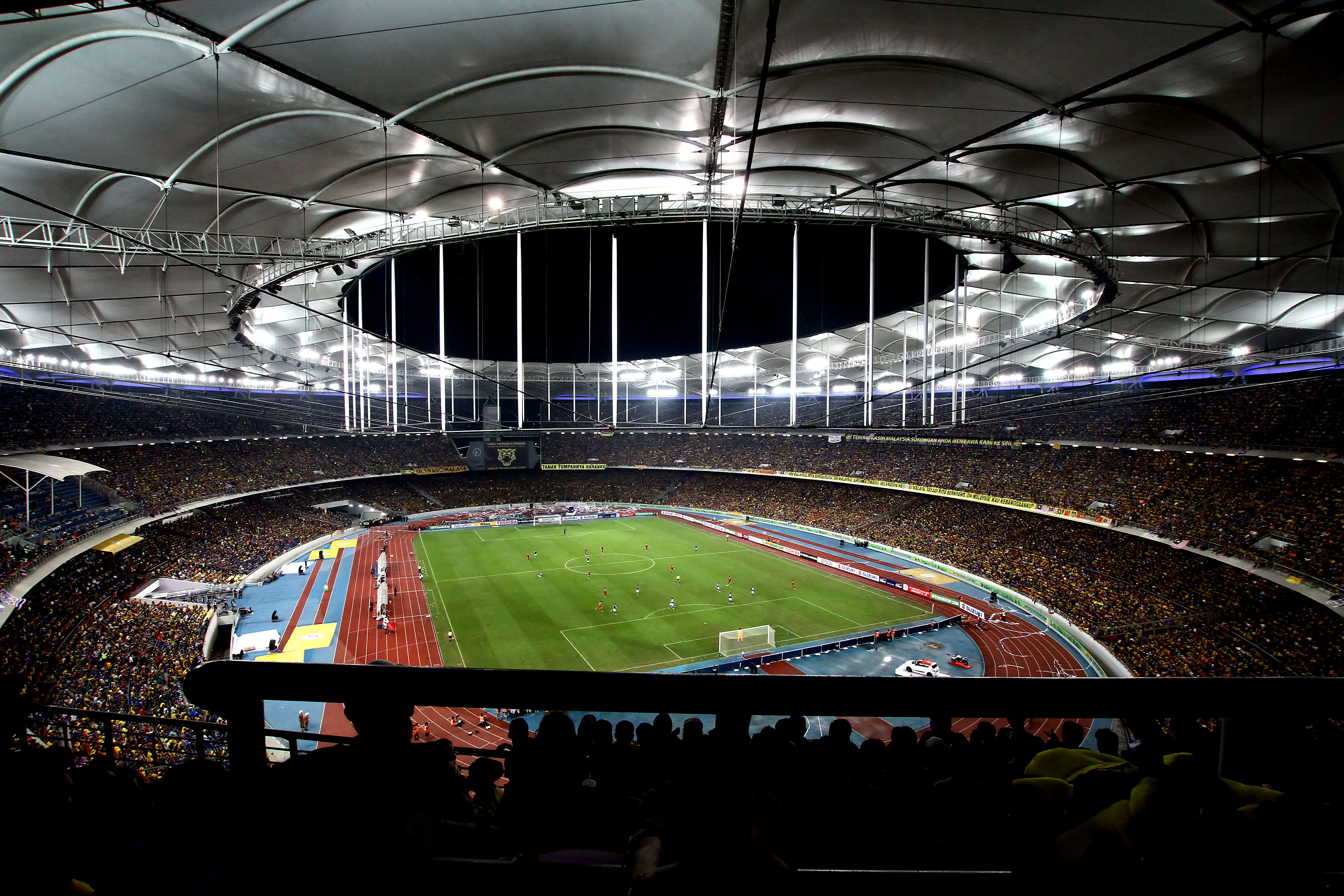
- The match took place at Bukit Jalil National Stadium.
- Event: 2026 Malaysia Cup
Johor Darul Ta'zim	Kuching City
2	0
- Date: 23 May 2026
- Venue: Bukit Jalil National Stadium, Bukit Jalil, Kuala Lumpur
- Man of the Match: Arif Aiman (Johor Darul Ta'zim)
- Referee: Mohammed Al-Shammari (Qatar)
- Attendance: 50,032
- Weather: Good; 27 °C (81 °F)

The 2026 Malaysia Cup final is a football match that was played on 23 May 2026, to determine the champion of the 2026 Malaysia Cup. It is the final game of the 99th edition of the Malaysia Cup, organized by the Football Association of Malaysia.

The final is played at the Bukit Jalil National Stadium in Bukit Jalil, Kuala Lumpur. The match was contested by Super League clubs Johor Darul Ta'zim (JDT) and Kuching City. JDT were appearing in their seventh major cup final, and Kuching City were appearing in their first major Malaysian cup final for the first time in their history.

== Teams ==
In the following table, finals until 1966 were in the Malaya Cup era, and since 1967 were in the Malaysia Cup era.

Team	Previous final appearances (bold indicates winners)
Johor Darul Ta'zim (Note: Previously known as Johor FC)	7 (2014, **2017**, **2019**, 2021, **2022**, **2023**, **2025**)
Kuching City (Note: Previously known as Kuching FA)	None

== Route to the final ==
The Malaysia Cup began with 16 teams in a single-elimination knockout cup competition. There were a total of three rounds leading up to the final. Teams were drawn against each other, and the winner after 90 minutes would advance. If still tied, 30 minutes of extra time were played. If the score was still level, a penalty shoot-out was used to determine the winner.

Johor Darul Ta'zim			Round	Kuching City
Opponent	Result	Legs		Opponent	Result	Legs
PDRM	11–1	10–1 away ; 1–0 home	Round of 16	Penang	2–1	0–1 away ; 2–0 home
Melaka	8–1	5–0 home ; 3–1 away	Quarter-finals	(Brunei) DPMM FC	6–2	3–1 away ; 3–1 home
Kuala Lumpur City	8–1	4–0 away ; 4–1 home	Semi-finals	Selangor	2–1	1–1 away ; 1–0 home

== Match ==
=== Details ===
23 May 2026
21:00 UTC+8

Johor Darul Ta'zim	2–0	Kuching City
M. Guilherme 81'; Arif 90+1'	Report (FAM); Report (MFL)

Bukit Jalil National Stadium, Kuala Lumpur
Attendance: 50,032
Referee: Mohammed Al-Shammari (Qatar)

**Johor Darul Ta'zim**	**Kuching City**

GK	16	(Malaysia) Syihan Hazmi
CB	5	(Spain) Antonio Glauder
CB	15	(Malaysia) Feroz Baharudin		(substituted off) 64'
CB	23	(Azerbaijan) Eddy Israfilov
RWB	24	(Philippines) Óscar Arribas
CM	4	(Malaysia) Afiq Fazail (c)	(yellow card) 3'	(substituted off) 86'
CM	28	(Malaysia) Nacho Méndez
LWB	22	(Malaysia) Corbin-Ong	(yellow card) 61'	(substituted off) 64'
RW	88	(Argentina) Manuel Hidalgo		(substituted off) 37'
CF	9	(Brazil) Bérgson		(substituted off) 86'
LW	95	(Brazil) Marcos Guilherme
Substitutes:
GK	1	(Malaysia) Christian Abad
DF	91	(Malaysia) Syahmi Safari		(substituted on) 64'
MF	12	(Malaysia) Stuart Wilkin		(substituted on) 86'
MF	20	(Spain) Teto Martín
MF	30	(Malaysia) Natxo Insa
MF	41	(Malaysia) Syamer Kutty Abba
MF	42	(Malaysia) Arif Aiman		(substituted on) 64'
MF	47	(Spain) Ager Aketxe		(substituted on) 37'
FW	97	(Brazil) Yago César		(substituted on) 86'
Coach:
(Spain) Xisco Muñoz

GK	20	(Malaysia) Haziq Nadzli
RWB	2	(Malaysia) Jimmy Raymond	(substituted off) 59'
CB	3	(Malaysia) Rodney Celvin	(substituted off) 83'
CB	35	(Nigeria) James Okwuosa (c)
CB	77	(Japan) Yuki Tanigawa
LWB	23	(Malaysia) Ariff Farhan	(substituted off) 83'
CM	10	(Namibia) Petrus Shitembi
CM	25	(Bahrain) Moses Atede	(substituted off) 83'
RW	22	(Timor-Leste) João Pedro	(substituted off) 53'
CF	11	(Cameroon) Jerome Etame
LW	7	(Malaysia) Ramadhan Saifullah
Substitutes:
GK	39	(Malaysia) Wan Azraie
DF	5	(Philippines) Scott Woods	(substituted on) 53'
DF	27	(Malaysia) Filemon Anyie	(substituted on) 83'
MF	21	(Malaysia) Danial Amier	(substituted on) 83'
MF	44	(Malaysia) Alif Hassan
MF	99	(Jordan) Ahmad Israiwah	(substituted on) 83'
FW	17	(Malaysia) Danial Asri	(substituted on) 59'
FW	18	(Cameroon) Ronald Ngah
FW	19	(Malaysia) Gabriel Nistelrooy
Coach:
(Singapore) Aidil Sharin

Man of the Match:
Arif Aiman (Johor Darul Ta'zim)

Assistant referees:
Yousuf Al Shamari (Qatar)
Khaled Khalaf (Qatar)
Fourth official:
Razlan Joffri Ali
Video assistant referee:
Meshari Al Shamari (Qatar)
Assistant video assistant referee:
Shafiq Ahmad Said

**Match rules**

- 90 minutes
- 30 minutes of extra time if necessary
- Penalty shoot-out if scores still level
- Nine named substitutes
- Maximum of five substitutions, with a sixth allowed in extra time (Note: Each team was given only three opportunities to make substitutions, with a fourth opportunity in extra time, excluding substitutions made at half-time, before the start of extra time and at half-time in extra time.)

== See also ==
- 2025 Malaysia FA Cup
- 2026 MFL Challenge Cup
