= Ekene Victor Emewulu =

Nigerian footballer

Personal information
- Full name: Ekene Victor Emewulu
- Date of birth: 1 January 2005 (age 21)
- Place of birth: Onitsha, Nigeria
- Height: 1.80 m (5 ft 11 in)
- Position: Striker

Team information
- Current team: Perak FA
- Number: 30

Senior career*
Years	Team	Apps	(Gls)
2024–2025	P/A FC		
2025–2026	Perak FA	10	(12)
Total		10	(12)
- * Club domestic league appearances and goals as of 30 January 2026

Ekene Victor Emewulu (born c. 2005) is a Nigerian professional footballer who plays as a striker for the Malaysia A1 Semi-Pro League club Perak FA.

== Career ==
=== Early career ===
Originally from Onitsha, Nigeria, Emewulu began his football development in his home country. He gained early recognition after finishing as the top scorer in the Bwari League NLO in Abuja. In 2022, he represented Nigeria in the Golden Eaglet Tournament held in Russia.

=== Perak FA ===
On 16 September 2025, Emewulu joined the revived Perak FA to compete in the 2025–26 Malaysia A1 Semi-Pro League. He made an immediate impact for the "Seladang," scoring in a 3–0 league victory over Machan FC in October 2025.

Emewulu was also a key part of the squad during the 2025–26 Malaysia Cup, where Perak FA achieved a historic 2–0 upset over Super League giants Kuala Lumpur City in the Round of 16 first leg on 18 January 2026.
