= Aliyu Abubakar (footballer) =

Nigerian footballer

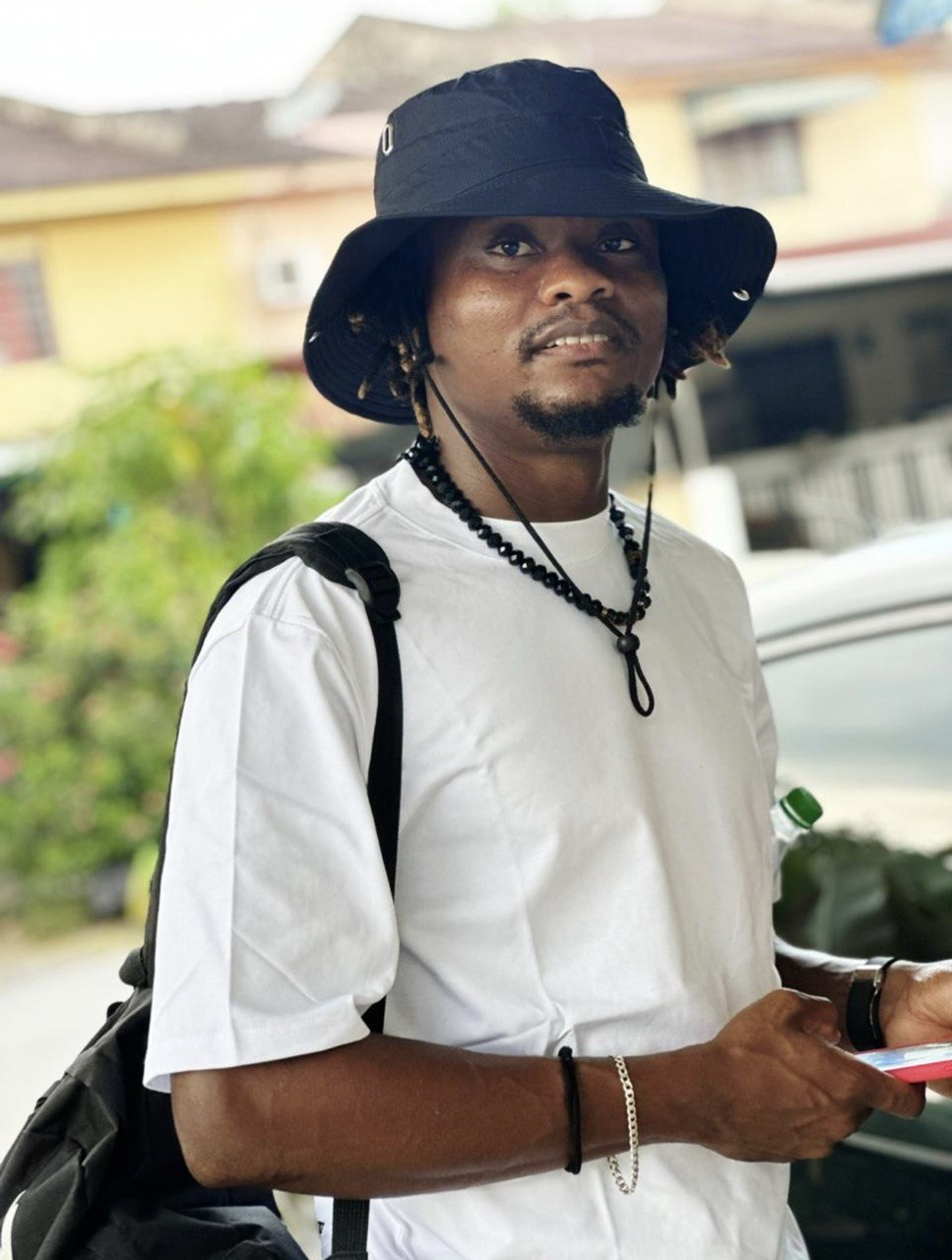
- Abubakar with Perak FA in 2026

Personal information
- Full name: Aliyu Audu Abubakar
- Date of birth: 15 June 1996 (age 30)
- Place of birth: Lagos, Nigeria
- Height: 1.88 m (6 ft 2 in)
- Position: Centre back

Team information
- Current team: Perak FA
- Number: 23

Youth career
- Mutunchi Academy

Senior career*
Years	Team	Apps	(Gls)
2014–2015	Ashdod	1	(0)
2015–2016	CA Bizertin	3	(0)
2016	KuPS	25	(0)
2017	Dila Gori	19	(0)
2018	PS Kemi	13	(1)
2018–2019	Slutsk	23	(0)
2019	Olimpik Donetsk	2	(0)
2020	Shakhter Karagandy	1	(0)
2020	Okzhetpes	11	(0)
2021	Zhetysu	3	(0)
2022–2023	Radnik Hadžići	9	(1)
2023	Khan-Tengri	21	(0)
2024–2025	Negeri Sembilan	13	(0)
2025–	Perak FA	10	(0)

International career^{‡}
2013	Nigeria U17	7	(0)
- * Club domestic league appearances and goals as of 31 January 2026 ‡ National team caps and goals as of 31 January 2026

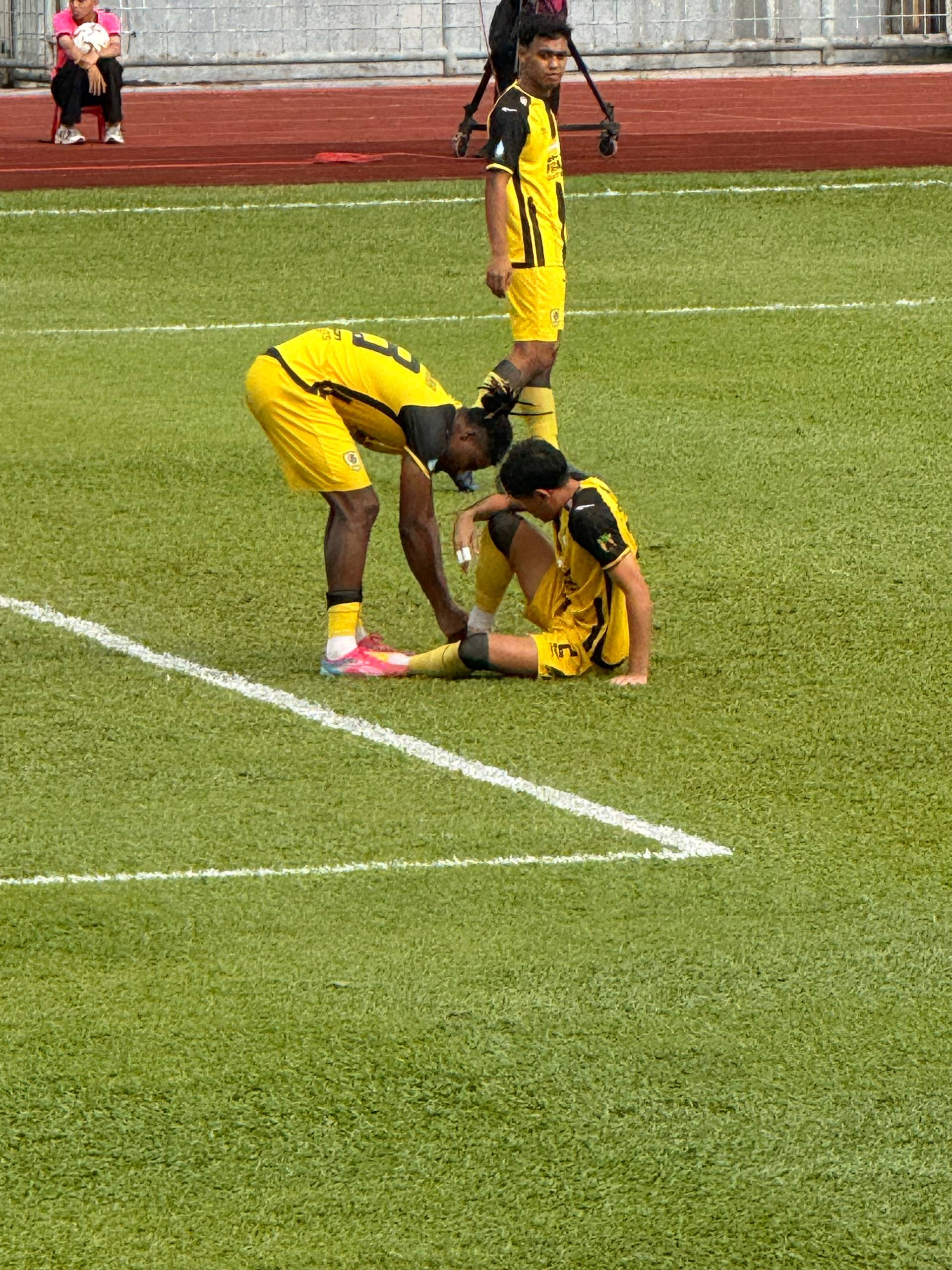
Aliyu helping Perak FA teammate

Aliyu Audu Abubakar (//; born 15 June 1996) is a Nigerian footballer who plays as a centre back for Malaysia A1 Semi-Pro League club Perak FA.

== Early life and youth career ==
Aliyu Audu Abubakar was born on 15 June 1996 in Nigeria. He began his football journey at Mutunchi Academy in Kaduna. He was selected as part of the Nigeria national under-17 football team for the 2013 FIFA U-17 World Cup in the United Arab Emirates. He apoeared in five matches during the tournament, among them, the final against Mexico, where Nigeria won.

Although he had been part of Nigeria’s 2013 FIFA U-17 World Cup-winning squad, Abubakar did not progress to Nigeria’s senior national team and spent much of his senior career moving between clubs in lower tiered European and Asian leagues.

For his contributions to the national victory, he was awarded the Member of the Order of the Niger (M.O.N) by the Nigerian government.

=== European Club Career ===
In December 2014, Abubakar signed a three-year contract with Ashdod, before leaving the club following their relegation at the end of the 2014–15 season. Following his release from Ashdod, Abubakar was linked with a move to an unnamed Serie A side. In December 2015, AllNigeriaSoccer reported that Abubakar was in advanced talks with an unnamed Serie A club and was expected to travel to Italy within two weeks, subject to obtaining a visa. The report did not identify the club. In March 2016, Abubakar signed a one-year contract with KuPS following a successful trial. In March 2016, Abubakar signed a one-year contract with KuPS, after a successful trial, then a year later, in February 2017, Abubakar signed for Dila Gori.

In April 2018, Aliyu moved to PS Kemi in Veikkausliiga.

On 5 February 2020, Shakhter Karagandy announced the signing of Abubakar. On 5 February 2020, Shakhter Karagandy announced the signing of Abubakar.

=== Kazakhstan and Bosnia (2020–2023) ===
In 2020, Abubakar returned to Kazakhstan, joining Shakhter Karagandy before moving to Okzhetpes, where he made 11 appearances in the Kazakhstan Premier League. Following a brief stint with Zhetysu in 2021, he moved to Bosnia and Herzegovina to join Radnik Hadžići for the 2022–23 season. On 12 November 2022, he scored a notable opening-minute header in a 3–1 away victory over OFK Gradina Srebrenik.

Abubakar returned to Kazakhstan in March 2023, signing for Khan Tengri. He became a mainstay in the defense, making 21 league appearances and totaling 1,845 minutes of play. During the 2023 campaign, he demonstrated tactical versatility by featuring as a left-back in fixtures against Zhas-Kyran and Taraz, helping the club maintain a competitive position in the Kazakhstan First Division before his move to Malaysia.

After appearing regularly in Finland, Georgia and Belarus between 2016 and 2019, Abubakar’s career became more itinerant, with shorter spells across Kazakhstan, Bosnia and Malaysia. His appearances declined sharply at several clubs, including Olimpik Donetsk, Shakhter Karagandy and Zhetysu, before he later played in second-tier or semi-professional competitions with Khan Tengri, Radnik Hadžići and Perak FA. .

His senior career has been marked by frequent transfers and short-term spells, with his trajectory moving from top divisions in Finland, Georgia, Belarus, Ukraine and Kazakhstan to lower-tier competitions in Bosnia, Kazakhstan and Malaysia. He later joined Perak FA, where he was listed as a defender for the 2025–26 season. In March 2024, Abubakar moved to Southeast Asia, signing with Negeri Sembilan FC in the Malaysia Super League.On 10 January 2025, Abubakar scored an eighth-minute own goal against Sri Pahang.https://www.thestar.com.my/sport/football/2025/01/11/football-negri-break-losing-streak-after-2-1-win-over-pahangHe made 13 league appearances during the 2024–25 season.

On 31 August 2025, Abubakar transferred to Perak FA to compete in the Malaysia A1 Semi-Pro League. In January 2026, he was part of the squad that defeated Super League side Kuala Lumpur City F.C. 2–0 in the first leg of the 2025–26 Malaysia Cup Round of 16. Despite a 3–2 aggregate loss following extra time in the second leg, the performance qualified Perak for the MFL Challenge Cup quarter-finals.

== Career statistics ==
As of 20 April 2026

Club	Season	League			Cup		League Cup		Total	
Club	Season	Division	Apps	Goals	Apps	Goals	Apps	Goals	Apps	Goals
Negeri Sembilan	2024–25	Super League	13	0	1	0	1	0	15	0
Perak FA	2025–26	A1 Semi-Pro	25	0	5	0	2	0	32	0
Career total			165	2	15	0	3	0	183	2

As of match played 20 April 2026

Appearances and goals by club, season and competition
Season	Club	League			National Cup		League Cup		Total	
Season	Club	Division	Apps	Goals	Apps	Goals	Apps	Goals	Apps	Goals
2016	KuPS	Veikkausliiga	25	0	1	0	0	0	26	0
2017	Dila Gori	Erovnuli Liga	19	0	2	0	–		21	0
2018	PS Kemi	Veikkausliiga	13	1	1	0	–		14	1
2018	Slutsk	Belarusian Premier League	11	0	0	0	–		11	0
2019	Slutsk	Belarusian Premier League	12	0	2	0	–		14	0
2019–20	Olimpik Donetsk	Ukrainian Premier League	2	0	0	0	–		2	0
2020	Shakhter Karagandy	Kazakhstan Premier League	1	0	0	0	–		1	0
2020	Okzhetpes	Kazakhstan Premier League	11	0	0	0	–		11	0
2021	Zhetysu	Kazakhstan Premier League	3	0	0	0	–		3	0
2022–23	Radnik Hadžići	First League of FBiH	9	1	0	0	–		9	1
2023	Khan Tengri	Kazakhstan Second Division	21	0	3	0	–		24	0
2024–25	Negeri Sembilan	Malaysia Super League	13	0	1	0	1	0	15	0
2025–26	Perak FA	Malaysia A1 Semi-Pro League	0	0	0	0	2	0	2	0
Career total			140	2	10	0	3	0	153	2

== Honours ==
=== International ===
Nigeria U17

- FIFA U-17 World Cup: 2013

=== Individual ===
Orders

- (Nigeria) Member of the Order of the Niger (M.O.N): 2013
