= LBR West Zone =

Liga Bolasepak Rakyat
- Founded: 13 September 2015; 9 years ago
- Country: Malaysia
- Confederation: AFC
- Number of clubs: 108
- Level on pyramid: 4
- Promotion to: FAM League
- Relegation to: States League
- Current champions: Kuching FA (1st title) (2016)
- Most championships: Kuching (1st title)
- Broadcaster(s): Astro Arena
- Website: Official website
- Current: 2016–17

Liga Bolasepak Rakyat (English: Malaysia People's Football League) is the fourth-tier football league in Malaysia. The league is managed by Liga Bolasepak Rakyat-Limited Liability Partnership (LBR-LLP) and it is an amateur-level competition. It was established in 2015 to provide an alternative entry point for young players. For 2016–17 season, there are a total of 108 clubs participated in the league to represent their district out of more than 150 possible districts in the country to play in the league. The clubs were divided into 8 zones according to their regional location.

The current champion is Kuching, a club from Borneo Zone 2 which won the league in 2015-16 season.

== LBR West Zone ==
There are 14 clubs competing in West Zone this season.

- (Penang) Barat Daya
- (Penang) Seberang Prai Selatan
- (Penang) Timur Laut Baru
- (Perak) Batang Padang
- (Perak) Kuala Kangsar
- Hilir Perak
- (Perak) Manjung
- (Perak) Kampar
- Ipoh (Kinta)
- (Perak) Batu Gajah (Kinta)
- (Perak) Kerian
- Lenggong (Hulu Perak)
- Grik (Hulu Perak)
- (Perak) Tanjung Malim (Muallim)

The team that did not compete for the season 2016/2017

- (Perak) Sungai Siput (Kuala Kangsar)
- Perak Tengah

=== Competition format ===
For the western zone, all 14 teams are divided into 3 groups. Preliminary round or a group matches will take place on a home away basis. All group winners will compete in the playoffs where no return leg will take place. 2 best teams in the playoffs will advance to the national level

Group A

- (Perak) Tanjung Malim (Muallim)
- (Perak) Kerian
- Lenggong (Hulu Perak)
- (Perak) Batang Padang
- (Penang) Timur Laut Baru

Group B

- (Perak) Manjung
- (Penang) Seberang Prai Selatan
- (Perak) Kampar
- (Perak) Batu Gajah (Kinta)
- (Perak) Kuala Kangsar

Group C

- Ipoh (Kinta)
- (Penang) Barat Daya
- Hilir Perak
- Grik (Hulu Perak)
