= Syamsul Saad =

Malaysian footballer

Personal information
- Full name: Syamsul bin Mohd Saad
- Date of birth: 3 March 1975 (age 51)
- Place of birth: Taiping, Perak, Malaysia
- Position: Defender

Team information
- Current team: Perak FA (Head coach)

Senior career*
Years	Team	Apps	(Gls)
1998–1999	Terengganu FA		(1)
2000–2008	Perak FA		(9)

International career
2004	Malaysia	1	(0)

Managerial career
- 2015–2016: Perak FA
- 2017: Perlis FA
- 2021: Perak II
- 2022: Kelantan United
- 2025–: Perak FA
- * Club domestic league appearances and goals

Syamsul Mohd Saad (born 3 March 1975) is a former Malaysian footballer who was a defender with Perak FA and Terengganu FA. He had a successful career with Perak. Syamsul is currently the coach of Malaysia A1 Semi-Pro League club Perak FA.

== Playing career ==
In his first season with Perak, he won the Malaysia Cup. He clinched two Malaysian League title with Perak in 2002 and 2003. On 2004 he won the Malaysia FA Cup. His career was cut short after receiving a serious injury.

After retiring, he has worked as head coach at Kiddo Kickers Academy, before re-joining Perak as youth coach. He was promoted to head coach role for the senior team in 2016.

== International career ==
Syamsul appeared once for the Malaysia national team, in a 2006 FIFA World Cup qualifier against Hong Kong in 2004.

== Managerial career ==
On 8 March 2017, he was appointed as a Perlis FA head coach.

=== Perak FA (2025–present) ===
On 26 July 2025, Syamsul was appointed as the head coach of the revived Perak FA state football team for their campaign in the 2025–26 Malaysia A1 Semi-Pro League and the 2026 Sukma Games.

In January 2026, Syamsul guided his youthful squad (primarily composed of U-23 and Sukma players) to a historic upset in the 2025–26 Malaysia Cup. In the Round of 16, Perak FA defeated Super League giants Kuala Lumpur City 2–0 in the first leg at Manjung Stadium. Despite a narrow 3–2 aggregate loss after extra time in the second leg, Syamsul was widely praised by the national media for his tactical discipline and faith in young local talent. Following the Malaysia Cup exit, he led the team into the MFL Challenge Cup quarter-finals.

Syamsul's 2025–26 campaign was highlighted by a significant "giant-killing" run in the 2025–26 Malaysia Cup. On 18 January 2026, his youthful squad defeated Malaysia Super League side Kuala Lumpur City 2–0 in the Round of 16 first leg, a result widely described as the upset of the season.

Following a narrow 3–2 aggregate exit after extra time in the second leg, Syamsul transitioned the team to the MFL Challenge Cup. To bolster the squad for the tournament, he oversaw the high-profile return of veteran winger Wan Zack Haikal on 29 January 2026.

== Personal life ==
Syamsul has two younger brother who is also a former footballers themselves; Shahrizal Saad who has played for Perak and Johor FC, and Shahrul Saad who is currently playing for Johor Darul Ta'zim.
