= West Zone =

West Zone may refer to:

== Places ==
- West Zone of São Paulo, an Administrative Zone of São Paulo, Brazil

== Organizations and companies ==
- West Zone cricket team, a first-class cricket team in Western India
- West Zone women's cricket team, a women's cricket team in Western India
- LBR West Zone, a football league in Malaysia
- West Zone Cultural Centre, a Cultural Zone established by the Government of India
- West Zone State University, a public university of the State of Rio de Janeiro, Brazil
- West Zone (Bangladesh Railway), a railway zone operated by Bangladesh Railway
- West Zone Power Distribution Company, an electricity distribution company located in Bangladesh

== Others ==
- West Zone (film), a 1952 Hungarian spy thriller film
