= Kuching Football Association =

Kuching Football Association Persatuan Bolasepak Kuching
- Formation: 2015
- Purpose: Football association
- Headquarters: Stadium Negeri, Petra Jaya
- Location: Kuching, Sarawak
- Website: Kuching FA

Kuching Football Association (KFA; Malay: Persatuan Bolasepak Kuching) is the governing body of football for the Malaysian region of Sarawak. Its parent body is the Football Association of Sarawak (FAS). KFA main objectives include developing football in schools, women and amateur clubs in Kuching District, Sarawak.

== History ==
In 2015, with the commencement of the People's Football League introduced by the Football Association of Malaysia, the purpose of the league was to transform lower leagues in Malaysia and promote amateur football in all districts and states across Malaysia. Consequently, Kuching F.A. was founded alongside it to represent the district of Kuching in Sarawak.

=== Breaking the Chains: Understanding the FA-to-FC Privatization in Malaysian Football ===
The landscape of Malaysian football underwent a massive structural shift when the Football Association of Malaysia (FAM) enforced the mandatory "FA-to-FC" privatization process. This directive required state Football Associations (FAs) to officially decouple from their professional football teams, transitioning them into independent Football Clubs (FCs). Far from a mere cosmetic name change, this corporate separation aimed to commercialize the sport and rescue domestic football from perennial financial instability.

- The Core Concept: Moving from Associations to Corporate EntitiesHistorically, top-tier Malaysian football teams operated as arms of state Football Associations. These FAs were registered under the Sports Commissioner (PJS) as non-profit societies. They relied heavily on state government subsidies and public funds to sign high-profile players and cover operational costs.The privatization process mandated a clean break in governance, forcing a transition into a corporate structure:
  - The Football Association (FA): Retains its status as a non-profit registry under the Sports Commissioner. Its scope is now strictly limited to state-level governance, managing local amateur leagues, and developing grassroots football.
  - The Football Club (FC): Reborn as a private commercial entity registered under the Companies Commission of Malaysia (SSM) as a Sendirian Berhad (Sdn. Bhd.). The FC absorbs the professional squad and is fully responsible for competing in the top-flight Malaysia Super League.

== Officials ==
=== Executive committee ===
As of 2025

| Position | Name |
|---|---|
| President | (Malaysia) Datuk Fazzrudin Abdul Rahman |
| Deputy president | (Malaysia) Sahrul Izam Ahmad |
| Vice president | (Malaysia) Nizam Mahmud |
| Vice president | (Malaysia) Ahmad Tajudin Zunaidi |
| Vice president | (Malaysia) Awang Termizi Awang Madhini |
| Vice president | (Malaysia) Dzulazlan Ibrahim |
| Vice president | (Malaysia) Mohamed Zawawi Ali Hassan |
| General secretary | (Malaysia) Awang Azami Awang Idris |

== Competitions ==
The Kuching Football Association has organized the following club competitions:

- Sarawak Premier League
- Premier Sarawak Cup

== Association affiliations ==
=== Notable affiliations ===
Clubs in the higher league competitions affiliated to the Kuching Football Association include:

- Football Association of Sarawak
- Kuching City
