= Football Association of Sarawak =

Football Association of Sarawak Persatuan Bolasepak Sarawak
- Abbreviation: FAS
- Formation: 1974
- Founder: Datuk Mohamad Taha Ariffin
- Purpose: Football association
- Headquarters: Stadium Negeri, Petra Jaya
- Location: Kuching, Sarawak
- President: Datuk Fazzrudin Abdul Rahman
- Website: FA Sarawak

Football Association of Sarawak (FAS; Malay: Persatuan Bolasepak Sarawak) is the governing body of football for the Malaysian region of Sarawak. Its parent body is the Government of Sarawak (Kerajaan Negeri Sarawak) and also supported by Asian Football Confederation (AFC), UEFA, and FIFA. FAS main objectives include developing football in schools & universities, focusing on local & regional football developments especially among women and youth communities in Sarawak, promoting more national and international football events, focusing on the high performance coaching skills and professional football techniques, and improving both amateur & professional football clubs in Sarawak.

== History ==
Football pitches have existed in the Kingdom of Sarawak before the World War I, such as in Bidi, Buso, Dalian, and Rajang River. In 1824, a club named Kuching Wanderers was formed, mainly consisting of Europeans ancestry. On 16 January 1928, Kuching Wanderers were transformed into Kuching Football Club. They played at local tournaments, most notably the James Buchanan Cup, named after the fifteenth President of the United States. Regular matches stopped in 1933 as several players left the country due to the world's economic slump. The following year, the Kuching Football Association was officially founded. From the 1950s until 1963, Sarawak competed in the Borneo Cup together with North Borneo football team and Brunei national football team. Following the formation of the Federation of Malaysia, the team subsequently joined the mainstream Malaysian football. However, in the 1970s, Sarawak football faced a decline and the management went bankrupt. The current Football Association of Sarawak was founded in 1974 by Datuk Mohamad Taha Ariffin with assistance from the Sarawak government. Its constitution was subsequently rewritten with a major overhaul, and the team established the Sarawak Cup. Sarawak qualified into the Malaysia Cup for the first time in 1978.

== Officials ==
=== Executive committee ===
As of 2025

Position	Name
President	(Malaysia) YB Dato Fazzrudin Haji Abdul Rahman
Deputy president	(Malaysia) YB Datuk Hamzah Brahim
Vice president	(Malaysia) Tuan Haji Sophie Haji Shariee
Vice president	(Malaysia) kr.Khairulddin Qalam Daud
Vice president	(Malaysia) Nichol Agoi
Vice president	(Malaysia) ASP Khairul Anuar Adeni
Vice president	(Malaysia) Mohd Haical Abdullah
General secretary	(Malaysia) Hasnandi Bin Mohd Jennis

== Competitions ==
The Sarawak Football Association has organized the following club competitions:

- Sarawak Premier League
- Premier Sarawak Cup

== Association affiliations ==
There are 12 football associations affiliated to the FAS.

- Kuching F.A.
- Samarahan F. A.
- Serian F. A.
- Sri Aman F. A.
- Betong F. A.
- Sarikei F. A.
- Mukah F. A.
- Sibu F. A.
- Kapit F. A.
- Bintulu F. A.
- Miri F. A.
- Limbang F. A.

=== Notable affiliations ===
Clubs in the higher league competitions affiliated to the Sarawak Football Association include:

- Kuching City, Malaysia Super League
- Machan, Malaysia A1 Semi-Pro League
- PFA Odin Sarawak, Malaysia Premier Futsal League
- Sarawak United FC, defunct
- Sarawak FA State Football Team, defunct
- Sarawak FA President and Youth, defunct
