= 2025–26 Sarawak Premier League =

Sarawak Premier League
- Season: 2025–26
- Champions: Bintulu FA
- Top goalscorer: Paul Sambang (Serian FA, 17 goals)
- Biggest home win: Samarahan FA 8–0 Sri Aman FA (25 October 2025)
- Biggest away win: Betong FA 0–7 Kuching FA (29 November 2025)
- Highest scoring: Samarahan FA 8–0 Sri Aman FA (25 October 2025)
- All statistics correct as of 15 February 2026.

The 2025–26 Sarawak Premier League was the inaugural season of the Sarawak Premier League, the top-tier football league in Sarawak, under the Football Association of Sarawak (FAS). A total of 13 teams competed in the Sarawak Premier League, starting 20 September 2025.

== Stadiums and locations ==
Locations of teams in the 2025–26 Sarawak Premier League

Team	Location	Stadium	Capacity
Betong FA	Betong	Betong Sports Complex	
Bintulu FA	Bintulu	Bintulu BDA Stadium	
Kapit FA	Kapit	Kapit Stadium	
Kuching FA	Kuching	Sarawak Stadium	40,000
Limbang FA	Limbang	Limbang Sports Complex	
Miri FA	Miri	Miri Stadium	
Mukah FA	Mukah	MDDM Mukah Mesra Football Field	
PDRM Sarawak	Kota Samarahan	UniMas Mini Stadium	1,000
Samarahan FA	Samarahan	Samarahan Stadium	
Sarikei FA	Sarikei	MDS Siburan Stadium	
Serian FA	Serian	MDS Siburan Stadium	
Sibu FA	Sibu	Tun Ahmad Zaidi Stadium	
Sri Aman FA	Sri Aman	Sri Aman Sport Complex	

== League table ==
=== Group A ===
Pos	Team	Pld	W	D	L	GF	GA	GD	Pts	Promotion, qualification or relegation
1	Serian FA	12	10	1	1	32	6	+26	31	Advance to knockout round
2	Kuching FA	12	9	3	0	43	5	+38	30	Advance to knockout round
3	Samarahan FA	12	8	1	3	31	12	+19	25	Advance to knockout round
4	PDRM Sarawak	12	2	5	5	11	21	−10	11	Advance to knockout round
5	Sri Aman FA	12	2	3	7	11	37	−26	9	
6	Betong FA	12	2	1	9	11	26	−15	7	
7	Sarikei FA	12	1	2	9	6	38	−32	5	

Updated to match(es) played on 20 December 2025. Source: Football Association of Sarawak
Rules for classification: 1) Points; 2) Goal difference; 3) Number of goals scored.

=== Group B ===
Pos	Team	Pld	W	D	L	GF	GA	GD	Pts	Promotion, qualification or relegation
1	Bintulu FA	10	7	3	0	28	6	+22	24	Advance to knockout round
2	Miri FA	10	7	1	2	22	10	+12	22	Advance to knockout round
3	Limbang FA	10	2	5	3	12	14	−2	11	Advance to knockout round
4	Kapit FA	10	3	2	5	13	18	−5	11	Advance to knockout round
5	Mukah FA	10	3	1	6	7	15	−8	10	
6	Sibu FA	10	1	2	7	11	30	−19	5	

Updated to match(es) played on 6 December 2025. Source: Football Association of Sarawak
Rules for classification: 1) Points; 2) Goal difference; 3) Number of goals scored.

== Knockout round (Sarawak Premier Cup) ==
=== Bracket ===
Quarter-finals
Bintulu FA	4	3	7
PDRM Sarawak	1	0	1
Kuching FA	1	1	2
Limbang FA	0	0	0
Serian FA	3	3	6
Kapit FA	0	1	1
Miri FA	0	1	1
Samarahan FA	3	2	5

Semi-finals
Bintulu FA	2	1	3
Kuching FA	1	1	2
Serian FA	0	0	0
Samarahan FA	0	1	1

Final
Bintulu FA	3
Samarahan FA	1

== Quarter-finals ==
The first legs were played on 10 January, and the second legs on 17 January 2026.

=== Summary ===
Team 1	Agg.	Team 2	1st leg	2nd leg
PDRM Sarawak	1–7	Bintulu FA	1–4	3–0
Kuching FA	2–0	Limbang FA	1–0	0–1
Kapit FA	1–6	Serian FA	0–3	3–1
Samarahan FA	5–1	Miri FA	3–0	1–2

=== Matches ===
First leg

10 January 2026
15:30 MYT

PDRM Sarawak	1–4	Bintulu FA
	Report

Sarawak Stadium, Kuching

Second leg

17 January 2026
15:30 MYT

Bintulu FA	3–0	PDRM Sarawak
	Report

Bintulu Stadium, Bintulu

First leg

10 January 2026
15:30 MYT

Kuching FA	1–0	Limbang FA
	Report

Sarawak State Stadium, Kuching

Second leg

17 January 2026
15:30 MYT

Limbang FA	0–1	Kuching FA
	Report

Limbang Sports Complex, Limbang

First leg

10 January 2026
15:30 MYT

Kapit FA	0–3	Serian FA
	Report

Kapit Stadium, Kapit

Second leg

17 January 2026
15:30 MYT

Serian FA	3–1	Kapit FA
	Report

UNIMAS Mini Stadium, Kota Samarahan

First leg

10 January 2026
15:30 MYT

Samarahan FA	3–0	Miri FA
	Report

Samarahan Stadium, Samarahan

Second leg

17 January 2026
15:30 MYT

Miri FA	1–2	Samarahan FA
	Report

Miri Stadium, Miri

== Semi-finals ==
The first legs were played on 24 January, and the second legs on 31 January 2026.

Team 1	Agg.	Team 2	1st leg	2nd leg
Bintulu FA	3–2	Kuching FA	2–1	1–1
Serian FA	0–1	Samarahan FA	0–0	0–1

=== Matches ===
24 January 2026
15:30 UTC+8

Kuching FA	1–2	Bintulu FA
Ainur Aiqal Ayub 50'	Report	53', 86' Mohd Haisal Yusuf

Sarawak Stadium, Kuching
1 February 2026
15:00 UTC+8

Bintulu FA	1–1	Kuching FA
Badrul Hafiz 90+1'	Report	7' Azuanie Jasman

Bintulu Stadium, Bintulu

Bintulu FA won 3–2 on aggregate

24 January 2026
15:30 UTC+8

Samarahan FA	0–0	Serian FA
	Report

Samarahan Stadium, Samarahan
31 January 2026
15:00 UTC+8

Serian FA	0–1	Samarahan FA
	Report	51' Razziman Razali

Sarawak Stadium, Kuching

Samarahan FA won 1–0 on aggregate

== Final ==
15 February 2026
15:00 UTC+8

Bintulu FA	3–1	Samarahan FA
Badrul Hafiz 53'; Shamir Izat 57'; Haisal Yusuf 74'	Report	Zarif Razali 66'

Sarawak State Stadium, Kuching

== Winners ==
Champions of 2025–26 Sarawak Premier Cup

Bintulu FA
First Title

== Season statistics ==
=== Top goalscorers ===
As of 6 December 2025

Rank	Player	Team	Goals
1	(Malaysia) Paul Sambang	Serian FA	22
2	(Malaysia) Mohd Haisal Yusuf	Bintulu FA	8
2	(Malaysia) Shafitri Salim	Kuching FA	8
4	(Malaysia) Ashri Chuchu	Samarahan FA	7
4	(Malaysia) Cornelius Ornley Jina	Kuching FA	7
6	(Malaysia) Harith Danielle Abdullah	Miri FA	6
6	(Malaysia) Mohd Zarif Razali	Samarahan FA	6

== See also ==
- 2025–26 Malaysia A3 Community League
