= Petrus Shitembi =

Namibian footballer

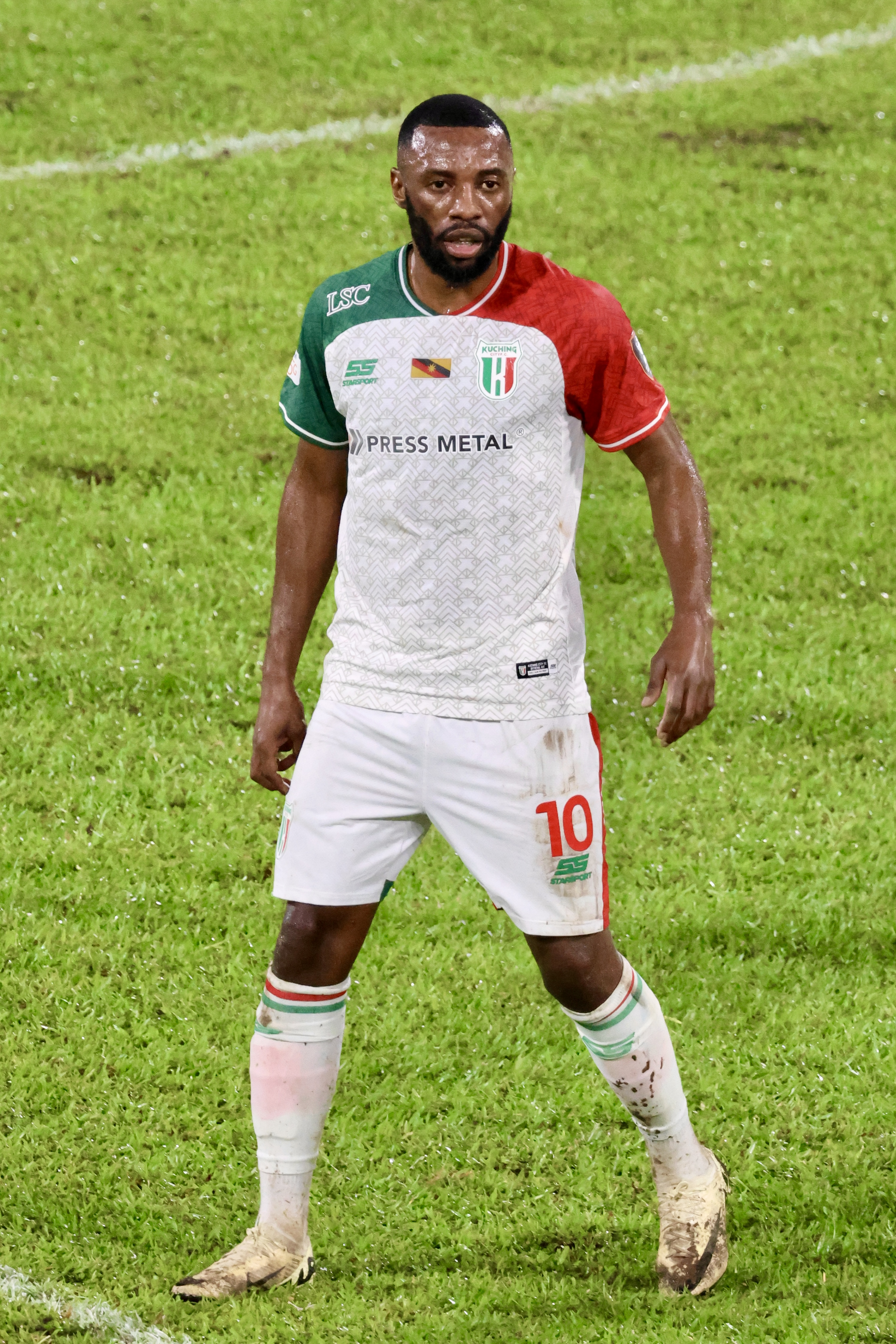
- Shitembi with Kuching City in 2025

Personal information
- Full name: Petrus Shitembi
- Date of birth: 11 May 1992 (age 34)
- Place of birth: Rundu, Namibia
- Height: 1.68 m (5 ft 6 in)
- Position: Attacking midfielder

Team information
- Current team: Kuching City
- Number: 10

Senior career*
Years	Team	Apps	(Gls)
2010–2013	Rundu Chiefs		
2013–2014	University of Pretoria	3	(0)
2014–2014	AmaZulu	1	(0)
2014–2015	Ashanti Gold	4	(0)
2015–2017	AmaZulu	25	(3)
2017	Stellenbosch	3	(1)
2017–2019	Tura Magic	0	(0)
2019	Lusaka Dynamos		
2020	Sabah	10	(0)
2021–2022	Terengganu	19	(1)
2023–	Kuching City	68	(9)

International career
2010–2024	Namibia	79	(4)
- * Club domestic league appearances and goals as of 18 August 2026

Petrus Shitembi (born 11 May 1992) is a Namibian footballer who plays as an attacking midfielder for Malaysian Super League club Kuching City, and the Namibia national team.

Shitembi is left-footed and has been nicknamed The Dancing Shoes for his ability to shake off defenders and create chances in front of goal.

== Club career ==
=== South Africa ===
On 24 January 2013, he signed a three-year contract with South African National First Division team University of Pretoria

=== Zambia ===
On 1 February 2019, he joined Zambian club Lusaka Dynamos Football Club. He left the club in the summer of 2019 and trialled with German club SpVgg Greuther Fürth, where he scored in a friendly game against Würzburger Kickers in September 2019.

=== Malaysia ===
==== Sabah ====
On 5 February 2020, moving outside of Africa for the first time in his career, Shitembi joined Malaysia Super League side Sabah on a free transfer. Although Shitembi only played a total of 900 minutes for the club, his impact on the team was praised by pundits, with FELDA United manager Nidzam Jamil describing Shitembi as the "destroyer of teams" after a 1–3 loss against Sabah.

==== Terengganu ====
On 28 December 2020, Shitembi signed for Terengganu and was given the number 19 shirt number.

In March 2021, during the pre-season preparations of the delayed 2021 Malaysia Super League season, Shitembi injured his ACL, which required him to undergo rehabilitation and recovery for the entirety of the season. To gain match fitness, Shitembi made his Terengganu debut for the reserve team Terengganu II in a Malaysia Premier League match against Perak, where he scored a goal in a 3–0 win.

In his first season fit playing for Terengganu, Shitembi managed to score 1 goal and provide 10 assists in 14 games. He also played an instrumental role in creating Terengganu's only goal in their 1-0 second round cup tie against Kedah FA.

==== Kuching City ====
On 1 August 2023, Shitembi joined Borneo side Kuching City on a free transfer. The move was seen as a surprise by many, as when Shitembi joined, Kuching City were last in the league, having only seven points from 18 games.

In the 2024–25 season, by January, Shitembi had already played 10 league games and 3 Malaysia Cup matches. Recognised as a crucial piece in manager Aidil Sharin Sahak's tactics, on 11 January 2025, he scored his second goal of the season in a 2-0 league win against PDRM, tripping a defender with a deft flick, before unleashing a beautiful left-footed finish into the back of the net.

On 14 February 2026, Shitembi assisted twice in a 3-1 second-leg quarter-final Malaysia Cup win against DPMM. In the semi-finals, Shitembi unleashed a weak-footed, long-range effort to score the only goal in a 1–0 win against Selangor. With one goal and three assists in six Malaysia Cup games, his goal set Kuching City through to the final of the Malaysia Cup as they won 2–1 on aggregate.

Shitembi departed the club upon the expiration of his contract on 15 July 2026. He left the club as one of the most pivotal players in Kuching City's historic campaign, as he contributed substantially to reaching the 2025–26 Malaysia Cup final, achieving 2nd place in the Malaysia Super League, and qualifying for the AFC Champions League Two for the first time in the club's history.

However, less than a month later, on 1 August 2026, Shitembi rejoined Kuching City on a one-year contract.

== International career ==
Shitembi progressed through Namibia's youth national teams before making his senior international debut within four years.

In 2012, he featured during Namibia's tour of Germany, scoring twice in a 3–1 victory over SV Herbern. He also appeared in a friendly match against Morocco on 12 January 2013.

=== International goals ===
Scores and results list Namibia's goal tally first.

No	Date	Venue	Opponent	Score	Result	Competition
1.	14 November 2012	Amahoro Stadium, Kigali, Rwanda	Rwanda	2–2	2–2	Friendly
2.	6 July 2013	Nkoloma Stadium, Lusaka, Zambia	Mauritius	1–0	2–1	2013 COSAFA Cup
3.	13 October 2018	Estádio do Zimpeto, Maputo, Mozambique	Mozambique	1–1	2–1	2019 Africa Cup of Nations qualification

== Honours ==
Kuching City

- MFL Challenge Cup runner-up: 2023
- Piala Malaysia runner-up: 2026
