= Kelantan FC and Kelantan Red Warrior Conflict =

The Kelantan FC and Kelantan Red Warrior (KRW) conflict is an ongoing dispute in Malaysian football, involving ownership, management, and identity of the Kelantan state football team. The conflict began when Kelantan FC was excluded from the Malaysian professional league in 2024, leading to the establishment of a new club by former shareholders and local supporters.

== Background ==
Kelantan FC is a professional football club based in Kota Bharu, Kelantan, popularly known as The Red Warriors (TRW). In 2020, businessman Norizam Tukiman (also known as Zamsaham) took full ownership of the club following privatization. However, financial mismanagement and licensing issues led to Kelantan FC being excluded from the Malaysian Super League in 2024.

== Role of Nik Hafiz Naim Nik Hassan ==
In 2022, entrepreneur and Skygear founder Nik Hafiz Naim Nik Hassan purchased a 5% stake in TRW Kelantan FC Sdn Bhd for RM3 million, becoming the second-largest shareholder after Zamsaham. Nik Hafiz later led the formation of the Save Kelantan Movement (Gerakan Selamatkan Kelantan - GSK) aiming to revive Kelantan football. After failing to take over Kelantan FC, he spearheaded the establishment of a new club.

== Formation of Kelantan Red Warrior FC (KRW) ==
In December 2024, the new club Kelantan Red Warrior FC (KRW) was founded by GSK and received support from the Kelantan Football Association (KAFA). KRW was registered as a new legal entity with no formal connection to Kelantan FC but still using the ‘Red Warriors’ name and red-and-white colors because they represent to state flag.

== FIFA investigation ==
In July 2025, FIFA issued a notice to KRW requesting clarification on whether KRW is the “sporting successor” to Kelantan FC due to outstanding wages and debts from the old club. KRW denied any legal or structural ties with Kelantan FC and stated it was an entirely new club.

In August 2025, Nik Hafiz stepped down as KRW president and relinquished all interests to facilitate league registration and resolve disputes. KRW currently competes in the 2025–26 Malaysia A1 Semi-Pro League.

== See also ==
- Malaysian football league system
- AFC Wimbledon
