= 2026 MFL Challenge Cup =

Piala Cabaran MFL 2026

Tournament details
- Country: Malaysia
- Date: 6 February 2026 – 19 April 2026
- Teams: 8

Final positions
- Champions: Sabah
- Runners-up: Penang

Tournament statistics
- Matches played: 14
- Goals scored: 28 (2 per match)
- Top goal scorer(s): (2 goals); Douglas Coutinho; Dylan Wenzel-Halls; Enzo Célestine; Fadhil Idris; Fergus Tierney; Gabriel Peres; Stefano Brundo
- All statistics correct as of 19 April 2026.

The 2026 MFL Challenge Cup is the fifth edition of Malaysia Challenge Cup tournament organised by Football Association of Malaysia (FAM) and Malaysian Football League (MFL). The tournament began on 6 February 2026 and ended on 19 April 2026.

Selangor were defending champions, defeated PDRM in the final with 7–0 on aggregate. They were unable to defend their title after advancing to the quarter-finals of Malaysia Cup knockout stage.

== Qualifying rounds ==
A total of 8 teams competed in the knockout phase, which the eight losers of the Malaysia Cup round of 16 will participate into the tournament.

The qualified teams will compete on the knockout stage to compete in a two-legged single-elimination tournament beginning with the quarter-finals followed by semi-finals and the final. Each tie is played on a home-and-away two-legged basis. The away goals rule, extra time and penalty shoot-out are used to decide the winner if necessary.

== Teams ==
All 8 teams eliminated from the Malaysia Cup round of 16 will enter the tournament. List of the teams are shown below:

Key to colours
Losers of round of 16 enter 2026 MFL Challenge Cup

Malaysia Cup Round of 16
Team
Immigration
Kelantan Red Warrior
Kelantan The Real Warriors
PDRM
Penang
Perak
Sabah
UM-Damansara United

== Format ==
Each tie in the knockout phase was played over two legs, with each team playing one leg at home. The team that scored more goals on aggregate over the two legs advanced to the next round. If the aggregate score was level, then 30 minutes of extra time was played (the away goals rule was not applied). If the score was still level at the end of extra time, the winners were decided by a penalty shoot-out. In the final, which was played as a single match, if the score was level at the end of normal time, extra time was played, followed by a penalty shoot-out if the score was still level. The mechanism of the draws for each round was as follows:

- In the draws for the quarter-finals onwards, there were no seedings, and teams from the same association could be drawn against each other. As the draws for the quarter-finals and semi-finals were held together before the quarter-finals were played, the identity of the quarter-final winners was not known at the time of the semi-final draw. A draw was also held to determine which semi-final winner would be designated as the "home" team for the final (for administrative purposes as it was played at a neutral venue).

== Schedule ==
The schedule was as follows (all draws were held at the Malaysian Football League headquarters in Petaling Jaya, Selangor).

Round	First leg	Second leg
Quarter-finals	6–8 February 2026	13–16 February 2026
Semi-finals	3–4 March 2026	11 March 2026
Final	4 April 2026	19 April 2026

== Knockout-stage ==
=== Bracket ===
In the knockout phase, teams played against each other over two legs on a home-and-away basis.

Quarter-finals
Immigration	1	1	2
Kelantan The Real Warriors	2	2	4
Kelantan Red Warrior	0	0	0
Penang	0	1	1
UM-Damansara United	0	2	2
Perak (a.e.t.)	1	3	4
Sabah	2	1	3
PDRM	0	1	1

Semi-finals
Kelantan The Real Warriors	2	0	2
Penang	5	1	6
Perak	0	0	0
Sabah	0	1	1

Final
Penang	1	0	1 (3)
Sabah (p)	1	0	1 (4)

=== Quarter-finals ===
The first legs were played on 6, 7 and 8 February, and the second legs were played on 13, 14, 15 and 16 February 2026.

Team 1	Agg.	Team 2	1st leg	2nd leg
UM-Damansara United	2–4	Perak	0–1	2–3 (a.e.t.)
Immigration	2–4	Kelantan The Real Warriors	1–2	1–2
Kelantan Red Warrior	0–1	Penang	0–0	0–1
Sabah	3–1	PDRM	2–0	1–1

=== Matches ===
First leg

6 February 2026
17:00

UM-Damansara United	0–1	Perak
	Report	Amirul Aiman 56'

UM Arena Stadium, Kuala Lumpur
Attendance: TBC
Referee: Afiq Naim

Second leg

13 February 2026
20:15

Perak	3–2 (a.e.t.)	UM-Damansara United
Hafizy 74' (pen.); Fadhil 95', 114'	Report	Wan Kuzri 80'; Shafizi 89'

Manjung Municipal Council Stadium, Seri Manjung
Attendance: TBC
Referee: Zulkarnain Zakaria

Perak won 4–2 on aggregate.

First leg

7 February 2026
17:00

Immigration	1–2	Kelantan The Real Warriors
Guéye 45+4'	Report	Célestine 4'; Asraff 29'

Penang State Stadium, Batu Kawan
Attendance: TBC
Referee: Munir Izam

Second leg

16 February 2026
21:00

Kelantan The Real Warriors	2–1	Immigration
Célestine 61'; Danial 77'	Report	Eduardo 12'

Sultan Muhammad IV Stadium, Kota Bharu
Attendance: TBC
Referee: Kamil Zakaria

Kelantan The Real Warriors won 4–2 on aggregate.

First leg

7 February 2026
21:00

Kelantan Red Warrior	0–0	Penang
	Report

Sultan Muhammad IV Stadium, Kota Bharu
Attendance: TBC
Referee: Ridzuan Husni

Second leg

14 February 2026
16:45

Penang	1–0	Kelantan Red Warrior
D. Countinho 81'	Report

City Stadium, George Town
Attendance: TBC
Referee: Shukor Zulkiflee

Penang won 1–0 on aggregate.

First leg

8 February 2026
19:00

Sabah	2–0	PDRM
Ingham 53'; Tierney 58'	Report

Likas Stadium, Kota Kinabalu
Attendance: TBC
Referee: Haziq Iqmal

Second leg

15 February 2026
21:00

PDRM	1–1	Sabah
Fakhrul 7'	Report	Tierney 8'

Selayang Municipal Council Stadium, Selayang
Attendance: TBC
Referee: Zam Azwan Khan

Sabah won 3–1 on aggregate.

=== Semi-finals ===
The first legs were played on 3 and 4 March, and the second legs were played on 11 March 2026.

Team 1	Agg.	Team 2	1st leg	2nd leg
Kelantan The Real Warriors	2–6	Penang	2–5	0–1
Perak	0–1	Sabah	0–0	0–1

=== Matches ===
First leg

3 March 2026
22:00

Kelantan The Real Warriors	2–5	Penang
Azwan 22'; Farris 38'	Report	Brundo 2'; D. Countinho 6'; Porteria 14'; Shamie 85'; Wenzel-Halls 90+8' (pen.)

Selayang Municipal Council Stadium, Selayang (Note: Kelantan The Real Warriors played their home matches at Selayang Municipal Council Stadium, Selayang, instead of their regular home stadium Sultan Muhammad IV Stadium, Kota Bharu.)
Attendance: TBC
Referee: Zulkarnain Zakaria

Second leg

11 March 2026
22:00

Penang	1–0	Kelantan The Real Warriors
Brundo 56' (pen.)	Report

City Stadium, George Town
Attendance: TBC
Referee: Afdzal Hilmi

Penang won 6–2 on aggregate.

First leg

4 March 2026
22:00

Perak	0–0	Sabah
	Report

Manjung Municipal Council Stadium, Seri Manjung
Attendance: TBC
Referee: Ridzuan Husni

Second leg

11 March 2026
21:15

Sabah	1–0	Perak
G. Peres 23'	Report

Likas Stadium, Kota Kinabalu
Attendance: TBC
Referee: Izzul Fikri

Sabah won 1–0 on aggregate.

=== Final ===
The first leg was played on 4 April, and the second leg was played on 19 April 2026.

Team 1	Agg.	Team 2	1st leg	2nd leg
Penang	1–1 (3–4 p)	Sabah	1–1	0–0 (a.e.t.)

=== Matches ===
First leg

4 April 2026
21:00

Penang	1–1	Sabah
Wenzel-Halls 71'	Report	G. Peres 90+4' (pen.)

City Stadium, George Town
Attendance: TBC
Referee: Shukor Zulkiflee

Second leg

19 April 2026
20:15

Sabah	0–0 (a.e.t.)	Penang
	Report
Penalties
Ljubic (penalty scored); Ingham (penalty scored); Pelekanos (penalty missed); Ernesto (penalty missed); Belfort (penalty scored); Farhan (penalty scored)	4–3	(penalty missed) Brundo; (penalty scored) D. Coutinho; (penalty scored) Obilor; (penalty missed) Porteria; (penalty scored) Musawi; (penalty missed) Adib

Likas Stadium, Kota Kinabalu
Attendance: 20,589
Referee: Firdaus Dahlan

1–1 on aggregate. Sabah won 4–3 on penalties.

Champions of 2026 MFL Challenge Cup

Sabah
First Title

== Statistics ==
=== Top goalscorers ===
Rank	Player	Club	Goals
1	(France) Enzo Célestine	Kelantan The Real Warriors	2
1	(Argentina) Stefano Brundo	Penang	2
1	(Australia) Dylan Wenzel-Halls	Penang	2
1	(Brazil) Douglas Coutinho	Penang	2
1	(Malaysia) Fadhil Idris	Perak	2
1	(Brazil) Gabriel Peres	Sabah	2
1	(Malaysia) Fergus Tierney	Sabah	2
8	(Senegal) Babacar Guèye	Immigration	1
8	(Venezuela) Eduardo Sosa	Immigration	1
8	(Malaysia) Asraff Aliffuddin	Kelantan The Real Warriors	1
8	(Malaysia) Azwan Aripin	Kelantan The Real Warriors	1
8	(Malaysia) Danial Haqim	Kelantan The Real Warriors	1
8	(Malaysia) Farris Izdiham	Kelantan The Real Warriors	1
8	(Malaysia) Fakhrul Azim	PDRM	1
8	(Malaysia) Shamie Iszuan	Penang	1
8	(Philippines) OJ Porteria	Penang	1
8	(Malaysia) Amirul Aiman	Perak	1
8	(Malaysia) Hafizy Daniel	Perak	1
8	(New Zealand) Dane Ingham	Sabah	1
8	(Malaysia) Shafizi Iqmal	UM-Damansara United	1
8	(Malaysia) Wan Kuzri	UM-Damansara United	1

== See also ==
- 2025 Piala Sumbangsih
- 2025 Malaysia FA Cup
- 2026 Malaysia Cup
- 2025–26 Malaysia Super League
