= 2026 Malaysia Cup =

Piala Malaysia 2026

Tournament details
- Country: Malaysia
- Dates: 17 January 2026 – 23 May 2026
- Teams: 16

Final positions
- Champions: Johor Darul Ta'zim (6th title)
- Runners-up: Kuching City

Tournament statistics
- Matches played: 29
- Goals scored: 88 (3.03 per match)
- Top goal scorer(s): (7 goals); Teto Martín

The 2026 Malaysia Cup (Malay: Piala Malaysia 2026), is the 99th edition of Malaysia Cup tournament organised by the Football Association of Malaysia (FAM) and the Malaysian Football League (MFL).

The competition were represented by foreign clubs for the first time since 2015, where Brunei-based club DPMM FC, will compete in the tournament as an invited club.

Johor Darul Ta'zim were the defending champions, having beaten Sri Pahang 2–1 to secure a 5th title in the previous season's final.

== Format ==
In the competition, the top 13 teams from the 2025–26 Malaysia Super League were joined by the top three teams from the 2025–26 Malaysia A1 Semi-Pro League. The competition was played from 17 January 2026 until 23 May 2026, with 16 teams in the knockout stage which began in the round of 16, followed by quarter-finals, semi-finals and the final. This stage was played in two legs, except for the final which was played as a single leg.

== Qualifying rounds ==
For this edition, a total of 16 teams will compete in the tournament, which qualifying results will be determined after the first round of Super League and A1 Semi-Pro League matches. The top 8 teams from Super League will automatically qualify to the knockout stage as seeded. Super League teams ranked 9th until 13th and three teams from A1 Semi-Pro League teams will be drawn as unseeded. Teams that fail to progress to the quarter-finals will automatically continue the challenge at the 2026 MFL Challenge Cup.

== Schedule and draw dates ==
The draw for the 2026 Malaysia Cup was held on 2 January 2026.

Phase	Round	First leg	Second leg
Knockout phase	Round of 16	17–19 January 2026	22–25 January 2026
Knockout phase	Quarter-finals	6–8 & 13 February 2026	14–15 & 25 February 2026
Knockout phase	Semi-finals	3 & 5 April 2026	7 & 18 April 2026
Knockout phase	Final	23 May 2026 at Bukit Jalil National Stadium, Kuala Lumpur	

== Seeding ==
The seeded teams were drawn against the unseeded teams, with the seeded teams become hosting for the second leg of round of 16.

For the draw, the teams were seeded and unseeded into two pots based on the following principles (introduced starting this season). The results seeding will be determined after the first round of Super League and A1 Semi-Pro League matches:

- Pot A contained the top 8 teams from 2025–26 Super League.
- Pot B contained the 9th until 13th placed teams from 2025–26 Super League, and the 3 teams selected from 2025–26 A1 Semi-Pro League, based on subject approval from the MFL Board of Directors.

Key to colours
Teams from 2025–26 Malaysia Super League
Teams from 2025–26 Malaysia A1 Semi-Pro League

Pot A (seeded)
Rank	Team
1	Johor Darul Ta'zim
2	Kuching City
3	Selangor
4	Kuala Lumpur City
5	Terengganu
6	Negeri Sembilan
7	(Brunei) DPMM
8	Sabah

Pot B (unseeded)
Rank	Team
9	Immigration
10	Kelantan The Real Warriors
11	Penang
12	Melaka
13	PDRM
14	Perak
15	UM-Damansara United
16	Kelantan Red Warrior

== Knockout stage ==
In the knockout phase, teams played against each other over two legs on a home-and-away basis, except for the final which was played as a single-leg game.

=== Bracket ===
Round of 16
UM-Damansara United	0	0	0
Terengganu	2	5	7
Perak	2	0	2
Kuala Lumpur City (a.e.t.)	0	3	3
PDRM	1	0	1
Johor Darul Ta'zim	10	1	11
Melaka	2	3	5
Sabah	2	0	2
Immigration	0	0	0
Negeri Sembilan	0	1	1
Kelantan The Real Warriors	1	0	1
Selangor	2	3	5
Kelantan Red Warrior	0	1	1
(Brunei) DPMM	2	1	3
Penang	1	0	1
Kuching City	0	2	2

Quarter-finals
Terengganu	1	1	2
Kuala Lumpur City	1	2	3
Johor Darul Ta'zim	5	3	8
Melaka	0	1	1
Negeri Sembilan	0	1	1
Selangor	1	5	6
(Brunei) DPMM	1	1	2
Kuching City	3	3	6

Semi-finals
Kuala Lumpur City	0	1	1
Johor Darul Ta'zim	4	4	8
Selangor	1	0	1
Kuching City	1	1	2

Final
Johor Darul Ta'zim	2
Kuching City	0

=== Round of 16 ===
The first legs were played on 17, 18 and 19 January, and the second legs were played on 22, 23, 24 and 25 January 2026. The losers were transferred to the MFL Challenge Cup.

Team 1	Agg.	Team 2	1st leg	2nd leg
Immigration	0–1	Negeri Sembilan	0–0	0–1
Melaka	5–2	Sabah	2–2	3–0
Kelantan Red Warrior	1–3	(Brunei) DPMM	0–2	1–1
Penang	1–2	Kuching City	1–0	0–2
PDRM	1–11	Johor Darul Ta'zim	1–10	0–1
Perak	2–3	Kuala Lumpur City	2–0	0–3 (a.e.t.)
UM-Damansara United	0–7	Terengganu	0–2	0–5
Kelantan The Real Warriors	1–5	Selangor	1–2	0–3

=== Quarter-finals ===
The first legs were played on 6, 7, 8 and 13 February, and the second legs were played on 14, 15 and 25 February 2026.

Team 1	Agg.	Team 2	1st leg	2nd leg
Terengganu	2–3	Kuala Lumpur City	1–1	1–2
DPMM (Brunei)	2–6	Kuching City	1–3	1–3
Negeri Sembilan	1–6	Selangor	0–1	1–5
Johor Darul Ta'zim	8–1	Melaka	5–0	3–1

=== Semi-finals ===
The first legs were played on 3 and 5 April, and the second legs were played on 7 and 18 April 2026.

Team 1	Agg.	Team 2	1st leg	2nd leg
Kuala Lumpur City	1–8	Johor Darul Ta'zim	0–4	1–4
Selangor	1–2	Kuching City	1–1	1–2

=== Final ===
The final will be played on 23 May 2026 at the Bukit Jalil National Stadium in Kuala Lumpur.

23 May 2026
21:00 UTC+8

Johor Darul Ta'zim	2–0	Kuching City
M. Guilherme 81'; Arif 90+1'	Report (FAM); Report (MFL)

Bukit Jalil National Stadium, Kuala Lumpur
Attendance: 50,032
Referee: Mohammed Al-Shammari (Qatar)

== Statistics ==
=== Top goalscorers ===
Rank	Player	Club	Goals
1	(Spain) Teto Martín	Johor Darul Ta'zim	7
2	(Bosnia and Herzegovina) Ajdin Mujagić	Sabah / Johor Darul Ta'zim	5
2	(Brazil) Chrigor	Selangor	5
4	(Brazil) Marcos Guilherme	Johor Darul Ta'zim	4
4	(Malaysia) Faisal Halim	Selangor	4
6	(Brazil) Bérgson	Johor Darul Ta'zim	3
6	(Cameroon) Ronald Ngah	Kuching City	3
6	(Egypt) Ahmed Shamsaldin	Melaka	3
6	(Brazil) Careca	Terengganu	3
6	(Malaysia) Engku Shakir	Terengganu	3
11	(Brunei) Hakeme Yazid	(Brunei) DPMM	2
11	(Argentina) Manuel Hidalgo	Johor Darul Ta'zim	2
11	(Brazil) Jairo	Johor Darul Ta'zim	2
11	(Spain) Ager Aketxe	Johor Darul Ta'zim	2
11	(Italy) Nicolao Cardoso	Kuala Lumpur City	2
11	(Malaysia) Paulo Josué	Kuala Lumpur City	2
17	33 players	14 clubs	1

=== Own goals ===
Player	Team	Against	Date	Goal
(Malaysia) Shivan Pillay	UM-Damansara United	Terengganu	19 January 2026	1
(Nigeria) James Okwuosa	Kuching City	(Brunei) DPMM	7 February 2026	1
(Brunei) Haimie Abdullah	(Brunei) DPMM	Kuching City	7 February 2026	1

== See also ==
- 2025 Piala Sumbangsih
- 2025–26 Malaysia Super League
- 2025 Malaysia FA Cup
