= Perak FA state football team =

Malaysian football club

Perak
- Full name: Perak FA state football team
- Founded: 1921; 105 years ago, as Perak Amateur Football Association; 2025; 1 year ago, as Perak FA state football team (revived)
- Ground: Perak Stadium; Chepor SSI Mini Stadium
- Capacity: 42,500; 1,000
- Owner: Perak Football Association
- Head coach: Noor Zaidi bin Rohmat
- League: Malaysia A1 Semi-Pro League
- Website: perakfa.com
Home colours	Away colours

Perak FA state football team (Malay: Pasukan Bola Sepak Negeri Perak), also known as Perak FA, is a Malaysian professional football club based in Ipoh. The club is governed by the Perak Football Association, representing the state of Perak in the second-tier Malaysia A1 Semi-Pro League. The club's home ground is 42,500 capacity Perak Stadium.

== History ==
Perak FA state football team was revived by participating in 2025–26 Malaysia A1 Semi-Pro League. The club is established to replace the disbanded Perak Football Club, which had previously been expelled from the Malaysia Super League due to licensing issues. Perak FA state football team is a separate entity and does not inherit the history or honours of Perak F.C. Perak FA qualified for the 2025–26 Malaysia Cup and was drawn against Kuala Lumpur City in the Round of 16. In the first leg Perak FA produced one of the competition's biggest upsets by defeating KL City 2–0 at the Manjung Municipal Council Stadium. Although they were narrowly eliminated after a 3–2 aggregate score, the performance earned them a spot in the MFL Challenge Cup.

=== 2025–26 Season ===
In 2025, Perak FA was revived to participate in the Malaysia A1 Semi-Pro League after the restructuring of state football. Under head coach Syamsul Saad, the team recruited a mix of local youth and foreign imports, including Nigerian trio Christian Chukwu, Aliyu Abubakar, and Ekene Victor Emewulu. The team gained national attention in January 2026 for defeating Kuala Lumpur City F.C. 2–0 in the first leg of the 2025–26 Malaysia Cup Round of 16.

== Academy development ==
Perak FA II acts as the primary bridge between district-level grassroots competitions across Perak and the senior Perak FA squad. By competing in the Liga A2 Amateur rather than age-restricted youth tournaments, the club aims to expose young local prospects to physical, senior-level competition while reducing operational overhead for the state association.

== Players ==
=== Current squad ===
As of August 2026

Note: Flags indicate national team as defined under FIFA eligibility rules; some limited exceptions apply. Players may hold more than one non-FIFA nationality.

No.	Pos.	Nation	Player
1	GK	MAS	Ahmad Farihin Hazimi^{U22}
2	DF	MAS	Fadhil Mohammad Azmi
3	DF	MAS	Haiqal Hafiq Sabri^{U22}
4	MF	MAS	Nasir Basharudin (captain)
5	MF	MAS	Firdaus Ahmad Fuad
6	MF	MAS	Akmal Hazim
7	MF	MAS	Ikhwan Hafizo
8	DF	MAS	Danish Haikal^{U22}
9	MF	MAS	Ahmad Daniel Hakimi^{U22}
10	MF	MAS	Harry Danish^{U22}
11	MF	MAS	Hazim Jamal Hisam^{U22}
13	DF	MAS	Tamotehran Jayashanker^{U22}
14	DF	NGR	Precious Uchenna

No.	Pos.	Nation	Player
15	DF	MAS	Nik Umar Nik Aziz
16	DF	MAS	Hafizy Daniel
17	FW	MAS	Afifin Arfa^{U22}
19	MF	MAS	Haziq Danish^{U22}
20	DF	MAS	Arshad Abdul Majeed
21	FW	MAS	Iffat Fahmi^{U22}
22	GK	MAS	Syazwan Syazany
24	DF	MAS	Nasrol Amri
25	GK	MAS	Shafiq Afifi
30	MF	MAS	Muslihuddin 'Atiq
80	FW	NGR	Chukwu Chijioke
88	MF	MAS	Wan Zack Haikal
98	MF	BRA	Luan Borges Machado Martins

== Club officials ==
As of August 2026

Position	Name
Team manager	(Malaysia) Dato' Ahmad Sabri Mohamed
Assistant manager	(Malaysia) Zainal Anuar Abdul Rashid
Head coach	(Malaysia) Noor Zaidi Rohmat
Assistant coach	(Malaysia) Shahrulnizam Mustapa (Malaysia) Azizan Mohd Ghazali
Goalkeeper coach	(Malaysia) Mohd Azlen Ahmad Jabri
Fitness coach	(Malaysia) Abu Mutalib Baeman
Team Doctor	(Malaysia) Dr. Lavinen Kumar a/l Sugumar
Physiotherapist	(Malaysia) Muhammad Aizat Razman
Team media	(Malaysia) Muhammad Fareez Salehudin
Kitman	(Malaysia) Khairul Asyraf Sahizah

== Head coaches ==
Coach	Years	Honours
(Malaysia) Syamsul Saad	2025	
(Malaysia) Noor Zaidi bin Rohmat	2026–	

== Season by season record ==
Season	Division	Position	Malaysia Cup	Malaysian FA Cup	MFL Challenge Cup	Regional	Top Scorer (All Competitions)
2025–26	Liga A1 Semi-Pro	5th of 15	Round of 16	DNQ	Semi-finals	–	(Nigeria) Ekene Victor Emewulu (12)
2026–27	Liga A1 Semi-Pro	TBD	TBD	TBD	TBD	–	TBD

Champions	Runners-up	Third place	Promoted	Relegated
