= Douglas Coutinho =

Brazilian footballer (born 1994)

Personal information
- Full name: Douglas Coutinho Gomes de Souza
- Date of birth: 8 February 1994 (age 32)
- Place of birth: Volta Redonda, Brazil
- Height: 1.83 m (6 ft 0 in)
- Position: Forward

Team information
- Current team: Mağusa Türk Gücü

Youth career
- 2008–2010: Cruzeiro
- 2011–2012: Atlético Paranaense

Senior career*
Years	Team	Apps	(Gls)
2012–2019	Atlético Paranaense	89	(23)
2016	→ Cruzeiro (loan)	16	(4)
2016	→ Braga (loan)	2	(0)
2018	→ Ceará (loan)	21	(4)
2018	→ Fortaleza (loan)	9	(2)
2019–2020	Seoul E-Land	18	(8)
2020–2021	Operário Ferroviário	38	(9)
2021	→ Al-Fujairah (loan)	13	(3)
2021	Vila Nova	3	(0)
2023–2024	Thép Xanh Nam Định	19	(4)
2024	→ Khatoco Khánh Hòa (loan)	12	(5)
2024–2025	Tombense	17	(0)
2025–2026	Borneo Samarinda	15	(5)
2026	→ Penang (loan)	8	(0)
2026–	Mağusa Türk Gücü	0	(0)
- * Club domestic league appearances and goals as of 15 May 2026

Douglas Coutinho Gomes de Souza (born 8 February 1994 in Volta Redonda) is a Brazilian professional footballer who plays as a forward for KTFF Süper Lig club Mağusa Türk Gücü.

== Club career ==
A Cruzeiro and Atletico Paranaense product, Douglas Coutinho broke into the first team with Atletico Paranaense in the 2013 season, regularly appearing in Atletico's 2013 and 2014 campaigns. Following a reduced role in Atletico's 2015 campaign, Douglas Coutinho was loaned twice in 2016 to Cruzeiro and SC Braga. After making 33 appearances for Atletico-PR in the 2017 season, Coutinho was loaned again to Ceará and second division side Fortaleza in 2018 before finding more success on a 2019 loan to Korean second-division side Seoul E-Land, where he scored nine goals. Douglas Coutinho moved to second division Brazilian side Operario Ferroviario in January 2020 on a yet another loan made permanent that July on a free transfer. Following a loan to Emirati side Al-Fujairah, Coutinho moved on a free transfer to Vila Nova, before being released some weeks later on 29 September 2021.

Coutinho found stability at Londrina in the Brazilian Serie B in the 2022 season, starting a career-high 31 league games and all but one of Londrina's 12 matches in a Parana championship run cut short by his old club Atletico Paranaense in the quarterfinals, but transferred to Tapajos on a free on 1 January 2023, who immediately loaned him to Campeonato Paulista side Ferroviaria for three months before he transferred back to Londrina on 3 April 2023, who released him on 29 April 2023.

Douglas Coutinho joined Vietnamese side Nam Dinh FC on 12 June 2023.

== Career statistics ==
As of 16 June 2023

Club	Season	League			State League		Cup		Continental		Total	
Club	Season	Division	Apps	Goals	Apps	Goals	Apps	Goals	Apps	Goals	Apps	Goals
Atlético-PR	2013	Serie A	7	0	20	11	3	1	0	0	30	12
Atlético-PR	2014	Serie A	28	7	4	0	1	0	5	0	38	7
Atlético-PR	2015	Serie A	13	2			1	1	0	0	14	3
Cruzeiro (loan)	2016	Serie A	7	1			0	0	0	0	16	4
SC Braga (loan)	2016–17	Liga NOS	1	0			1	0			2	0
Atletico-PR	2017	Serie A	26	3					7	1	33	4
Ceará (loan)	2018	Serie A	5	0							21	4
Fortaleza (loan)	2018	Serie B	6	0							9	2
Seoul E-Land (loan)	2019	K-League 2	18	8			1	1			19	9
	Total		48	9	24	11	5	2	5	0	115	26
Operario-PR	2020	Serie B	25	4	7	1	2	0			40	9
Al-Fujairah (loan)	2020–1	UAE Pro League	13	3							13	3
Vila Nova	2021	Serie B	3	0							3	0
Londrina	2022	Serie B	34	7	12	4	1	0			47	11
Tapajos (PR)	2023	Paranaense	0								0	0
Ferroviaria	2023	Paulistao A1	6	0							6	0
Nam Dinh FC	2023	V.League 1										
Career total			192	35	43	16	10	3	12	1	291	68

== Honours ==
Penang

- MFL Challenge Cup runner-up: 2026
