= Liga Bolasepak Rakyat =

Malaysian Football league

- Founded: 2015
- Folded: 2017
- Country: Malaysia
- Confederation: AFC
- Number of clubs: 108
- Last champions: Gua Musang (1st title) (2017)
- Most championships: Kuching; Gua Musang (1 title)

Liga Bolasepak Rakyat (English: Malaysia People's Football League) was a fourth-tier football league in Malaysia. The league was managed by the Liga Bolasepak Rakyat-Limited Liability Partnership (LBR-LLP) and functioned as an amateur-level competition. Established in 2015, it aimed to provide an alternative entry point for young players. The league was discontinued after the 2017 season and was succeeded by the M4 League.

The last champion was Gua Musang, a club from the East Zone, which won the league in the 2016–17 season.

== History ==
Liga Bolasepak Rakyat was an initiative by the then Football Association of Malaysia (FAM) president, Tengku Abdullah Sultan Ahmad Shah, with the aim of systematically developing football and serving as an institution to nurture talented players for the national team. The competition was open to players under 28 years old, with a requirement that each team include at least five players under 21.

After a successful early stage, the FAM transferred the management rights of the league to LBR-LLP for a period of ten years to facilitate the development of lower-league football.

LBR-LLP also announced the establishment of a women's league as part of its efforts to promote women's football development in Malaysia.

== Clubs ==
A total of 108 clubs out of more than 150 possible districts in the country participated in the Liga Bolasepak Rakyat for 2016–17 season. The clubs were divided into 8 zones according to regional location.

== Champions ==
Season	Champions	Runners-up	Score in final
2016	Kuching	Padang Besar	3–1
2017	Gua Musang	Serian	(a) 2–2 (Note: For the 2016–17 season, the final was played over two legs. Gua Musang became the champion on away goals rule.)

== Performance by club (2015–2017) ==
Club	Winners	Runners-up
Kuching	1	0
Gua Musang	1	0
Padang Besar	0	1
Serian	0	1
Tawau	1	0
Rantau Panjang-EJD	0	1

== Performance by states (2015–2017) ==
Clubs	Winners	Runners-up
Sarawak	1	1
Kelantan	1	1
Perlis	0	1
Kedah	0	0
Penang	0	0
Perak	0	0
Selangor	0	0
Negeri Sembilan	0	0
Malacca	0	0
Johor	0	0
Terengganu	0	0
Pahang	0	0
Sabah	1	0
Federal Territories	0	0
