= Marcos Guilherme =

Brazilian footballer

Personal information
- Full name: Marcos Guilherme de Almeida Santos Matos
- Date of birth: 5 August 1995 (age 31)
- Place of birth: Itararé, Brazil
- Height: 1.72 m (5 ft 7 1/2 in)
- Position: Winger

Team information
- Current team: Johor Darul Ta'zim
- Number: 95

Youth career
- Itararé
- 2008–2013: Athletico Paranaense

Senior career*
| Years | Team | Apps | (Gls) |
| 2013–2018 | Athletico Paranaense | 115 | (18) |
| 2017 | → Dinamo Zagreb (loan) | 11 | (0) |
| 2017 | → Dinamo Zagreb II (loan) | 2 | (0) |
| 2017–2018 | → São Paulo (loan) | 44 | (9) |
| 2018–2019 | Al-Wehda | 40 | (10) |
| 2020–2022 | Internacional | 46 | (3) |
| 2021–2022 | → Santos (loan) | 45 | (7) |
| 2022 | São Paulo | 16 | (1) |
| 2023 | Khimki | 10 | (1) |
| 2023–2025 | V-Varen Nagasaki | 71 | (15) |
| 2025 | → FC Tokyo (loan) | 3 | (0) |
| 2026– | Johor Darul Ta'zim | 8 | (4) |

International career
| 2015 | Brazil U20 | 17 | (6) |
- * Club domestic league appearances and goals as of 28 April 2026

Marcos Guilherme de Almeida Santos Matos (born 5 August 1995), known as Marcos Guilherme, is a Brazilian professional footballer who plays as a winger for Malaysia Super League club Johor Darul Ta'zim.

== Club career ==
=== Atlético Paranaense ===
Born in Itararé, São Paulo, Marcos Guilherme joined Atlético Paranaense's youth setup in 2008, aged 13. He made his senior debuts with the club's reserves in 2013 Campeonato Paranaense, scoring his first senior goal on 14 March, in a 2–0 home win against Nacional-PR.

Marcos Guilherme was promoted to the main squad in 2014, and made his Série A debut on 20 April 2014, starting in a 1–0 home win against Grêmio. He scored his first goal on 10 May, netting the first of a 1–2 away loss against Internacional.

On 5 September 2014, Marcos Guilherme extended his link with Furacão until 2018. He finished his debut year as the club's top scorer and player with most caps, with 11 goals in 54 matches.

==== Dinamo Zagreb (loan) ====
In January 2017, Croatian club GNK Dinamo Zagreb announced that Marcos Guillherme signed for the club on loan until the end of the season. He contributed with 11 league appearances, and helped the side to reach the Final of the Croatian Football Cup, where they lost to HNK Rijeka.

==== São Paulo (loan) ====
On 20 July 2017, Marcos Guilherme joined São Paulo on loan until the end of 2018. He made his debut for the club nine days later, coming on as a second-half substitute for Petros and scoring twice in a 4–3 away win against Botafogo.

Marcos Guilherme became a regular starter for the club, featuring in every match of the 2017 campaign after his arrival, but left the club on 3 June 2018 after São Paulo could not reach an agreement with Atlético for a permanent transfer.

=== Al-Wehda ===
On 9 June 2018, Marcos Guilherme signed for Saudi Professional League club Al-Wehda. A regular starter in his first season, he was only sparingly used in his second before leaving.

=== Internacional ===
On 12 January 2020, Marcos Guilherme agreed to a two-year deal with Internacional.

==== Santos (loan) ====
On 27 May 2021, Marcos Guilherme moved to Santos on a loan deal until June 2022. A regular starter under managers Fernando Diniz and Fábio Carille, he often played outside of his main position before losing his starting spot after the arrival of new manager Fabián Bustos.

=== Return to São Paulo ===
On 21 June 2022, after terminating his contract with Internacional, Marcos Guilherme agreed to return to São Paulo.

=== Khimki ===
On 9 February 2023, Guilherme signed a year-and-a-half contract with Russian Premier League club FC Khimki. Following Khimki's relegation, he left the club in June 2023.

== International career ==
Marcos Guilherme was called up by Alexandre Gallo to Brazil under-20 team for the 2015 South American Youth Football Championship. He finished the competition being his side's top scorer, with four goals under his name.

== Career statistics ==
As of 3 March 2023

Appearances and goals by club, season and competition
| Club | Season | League | | | State League | | Cup | | Continental | | Other | | Total | |
| Club | Season | Division | Apps | Goals | Apps | Goals | Apps | Goals | Apps | Goals | Apps | Goals | Apps | Goals |
|---|---|---|---|---|---|---|---|---|---|---|---|---|---|---|
| Atlético Paranaense | 2013 | Série A | 0 | 0 | 16 | 1 | 0 | 0 | — | | — | | 16 | 1 |
| Atlético Paranaense | 2014 | Série A | 36 | 3 | 14 | 8 | 2 | 0 | 1 (Note: Appearance(s) in Copa Libertadores) | 0 | — | | 53 | 11 |
| Atlético Paranaense | 2015 | Série A | 26 | 4 | 10 | 1 | 4 | 0 | 6 (Note: Appearance(s) in Copa Sudamericana) | 1 | — | | 46 | 6 |
| Atlético Paranaense | 2016 | Série A | 20 | 0 | 13 | 1 | 4 | 1 | — | | 4 (Note: Appearance(s) in Primeira Liga) | 1 | 41 | 3 |
| Atlético Paranaense | Subtotal | | 82 | 7 | 53 | 11 | 10 | 1 | 7 | 1 | 4 | 1 | 156 | 21 |
| Dinamo Zagreb (loan) | 2016–17 | Prva HNL | 11 | 0 | — | | 2 | 0 | — | | — | | 13 | 0 |
| Dinamo Zagreb II (loan) | 2016–17 | Druga HNL | 2 | 0 | — | | — | | — | | — | | 2 | 0 |
| São Paulo (loan) | 2017 | Série A | 22 | 6 | — | | — | | — | | — | | 22 | 6 |
| São Paulo (loan) | 2018 | Série A | 6 | 1 | 16 | 2 | 5 | 1 | 0 | 0 | — | | 27 | 4 |
| São Paulo (loan) | Subtotal | | 28 | 7 | 16 | 2 | 5 | 1 | 0 | 0 | — | | 49 | 10 |
| Al-Wehda | 2018–19 | Professional League | 29 | 9 | — | | 2 | 0 | — | | — | | 31 | 9 |
| Al-Wehda | 2019–20 | Professional League | 11 | 1 | — | | 1 | 0 | — | | — | | 12 | 1 |
| Al-Wehda | Subtotal | | 40 | 10 | — | | 3 | 0 | — | | — | | 43 | 10 |
| Internacional | 2020 | Série A | 27 | 0 | 13 | 2 | 2 | 0 | 9 | 2 | — | | 51 | 4 |
| Internacional | 2021 | Série A | 0 | 0 | 6 | 1 | 0 | 0 | 4 | 0 | — | | 10 | 1 |
| Internacional | Subtotal | | 27 | 0 | 19 | 3 | 2 | 0 | 13 | 2 | — | | 61 | 5 |
| Santos (loan) | 2021 | Série A | 35 | 1 | — | | 6 | 1 | 4 | 0 | — | | 45 | 6 |
| Santos (loan) | 2022 | Série A | 16 | 0 | 9 | 2 | 2 | 0 | 1 | 0 | — | | 28 | 2 |
| Santos (loan) | Subtotal | | 51 | 1 | 9 | 2 | 8 | 1 | 5 | 0 | — | | 73 | 8 |
| Khimki | 2022–23 | RPL | 1 | 1 | — | | — | | — | | — | | 1 | 1 |
| Career total | | | 242 | 30 | 97 | 18 | 30 | 3 | 25 | 3 | 4 | 1 | 398 | 55 |

== Honours ==
Atlético Paranaense

- Campeonato Paranaense: 2016
