= James Okwuosa =

Nigerian footballer

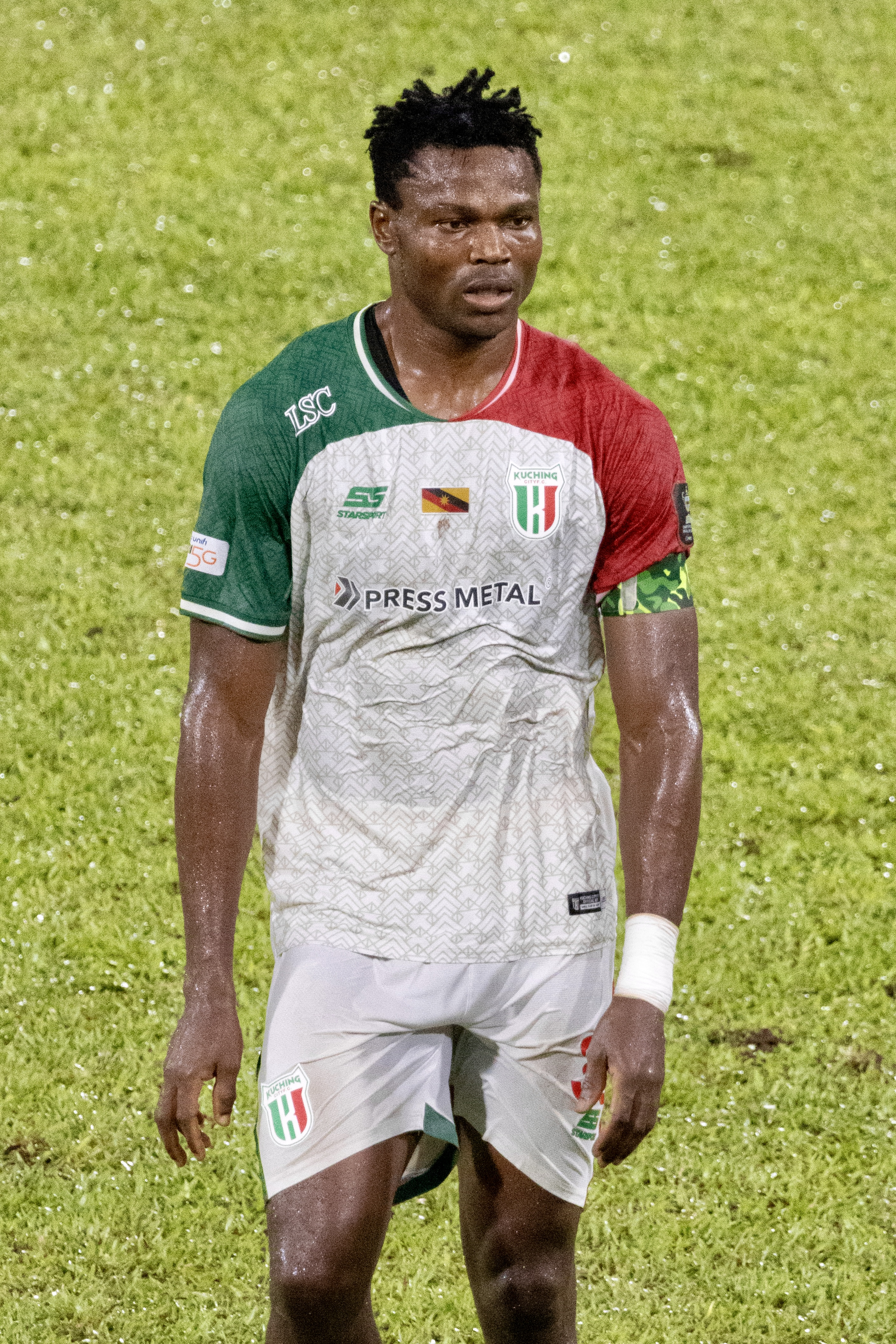
- Okwuosa with Kuching City in 2025

Personal information
- Full name: James Onyekachukwu Okwuosa
- Date of birth: 14 September 1990 (age 36)
- Place of birth: Ogbaru, Nigeria
- Height: 1.91 m (6 ft 3 in)
- Position: Central defender

Team information
- Current team: Kuching City
- Number: 35

Youth career
- El-Kanemi Warriors

Senior career*
Years	Team	Apps	(Gls)
2009–2010	Lobi Stars		
2010–2012	Enugu Rangers		
2012–2019	Chippa United	111	(0)
2017	→ Orlando Pirates (loan)	1	(0)
2019–2021	Qadsia SC		
2021–2022	Al Shabab		
2023	PDRM	24	(3)
2024–	Kuching City	14	(0)

International career^{‡}
2013	Nigeria	3	(0)
- * Club domestic league appearances and goals as of 12 September 2021 ‡ National team caps and goals as of 12 October 2013

James Onyekachukwu Okwuosa (born 14 September 1990) is a Nigerian professional footballer who plays as a defender for and captains the Malaysia Super League club Kuching City.

== Club career ==
On 5 September 2019, Okwuosa moved to Kuwait club Qadsia SC.

On 4 September 2021, he moved to another Kuwaiti club, Al Shabab.

On 3 February 2023, Okwuosa moved to Malaysia Super League club PDRM.

== International career ==
Okwuosa made his debut for the Nigeria national team as a substitute in the August 2013 during a match against South Africa in the Mandela cup – a match the Eagles won 2–0. He subsequently played during a friendly match against Burkina Faso in Kaduna which Nigeria won 4–1. On 13 October 2013, he competed in his first competitive match as a substitute for Emmanuel Emenike in the 93rd minute during the 2014 FIFA World Cup qualification match against Ethiopia in Addis Ababa.
