= Teto (footballer) =

Spanish professional footballer (born 2001)

Personal information
- Full name: Alberto Martín Díaz
- Date of birth: 13 September 2001 (age 25)
- Place of birth: Santa Cruz de Tenerife, Spain
- Height: 1.75 m (5 ft 9 in)
- Position: Winger

Team information
- Current team: Johor Darul Ta'zim

Youth career
- 2011–2021: Tenerife

Senior career*
Years	Team	Apps	(Gls)
2021–2022	Tenerife B	37	(10)
2021–2025	Tenerife	91	(6)
2025–	Johor Darul Ta'zim	10	(3)
- * Club domestic league appearances and goals as of 29 July 2025

Alberto Martín Díaz (born 13 September 2001), commonly known as Teto, is a Spanish professional footballer who plays as a right winger for Malaysia Super League club Johor Darul Ta'zim.

== Club career ==
Born in Santa Cruz de Tenerife, Canary Islands, Teto joined CD Tenerife's youth setup in 2011, aged nine. He made his senior debut with the reserves on 20 March 2021, coming on as a second-half substitute and scoring his team's second in a 2–0 Tercera División away win over Atlético Unión Güímar.

Teto made his first team debut on 2 December 2021, replacing Emmanuel Apeh in the extra time of a 2–1 away win over CD Ibiza Islas Pitiusas, the season's Copa del Rey. His professional debut occurred the following 13 August, as he replaced Samuel Shashoua late into a 2–1 loss at SD Eibar in the Segunda División.

Teto scored his first professional goal on 19 September 2022, netting his team's third in a 3–1 home win over Málaga CF. On 11 November, after establishing himself as a regular in the first team, he renewed his contract until 2027.

On 29 July 2025, after suffering relegation, Teto moved abroad for the first time in his career after being transferred to Johor Darul Ta'zim of the Malaysia Super League.

== Honours ==
=== Johor Darul Ta'zim ===
- Malaysia Charity Shield: 2025
