= Kelantan Red Warrior F.C. =

Malaysian football club

Kelantan Red Warrior
- Full name: Kelantan Red Warrior Football Club
- Nickname: Pahlawan Merah
- Short name: KRW
- Founded: 21 December 2024; 22 months ago
- Stadium: Sultan Muhammad IV Stadium
- Capacity: 30,000
- Chairman: Mohd Nassuruddin Daud
- CEO: Wan Mohd Fajarul Ekram
- Head coach: Irfan Bakti Abu Salim
- League: Malaysia Super League
- 2025–26: Malaysia A1 Semi-Pro League, 4th of 16 (promoted)
- Website: kelantanredwarrior.com
Home colours	Away colours	Third colours

Kelantan Red Warrior Football Club is a Malaysian professional football club based in Kota Bharu, Kelantan. They play in the top division Malaysia Super League, after promotion from the Malaysia A1 Semi-Pro League in 2025–26.

Kelantan Red Warrior become the fourth club based in Kelantan to play in the top flight league football in Malaysia.

== History ==
=== Formation and early years (2024–present) ===
The club was founded on 21 December 2024 by the chairman of the Gerakan Selamatkan Kelantan FC (GSK) Nik Hafiz Naim Nik Hassan in a joint venture with the Football Association of Kelantan. On 16 January 2025, Irfan Bakti Abu Salim has been appointed as the club's head coach. On 5 June, the club has been accepted to the Malaysia A1 Semi-Pro League.

==== FIFA investigation, new ownership ====
In July 2025, FIFA issued a notice to Kelantan Red Warrior Football Club, requesting clarification on whether it is the “sporting successor” of Kelantan Football Club, due to outstanding wages and debts from the old club. The club denied any legal or structural ties with Kelantan and stated it was an entirely new club. In August 2025, Nik Hafiz stepped down as the club president and relinquished all interests to facilitate the league registration. Zaki Harun, the former Kelantan chief police officer, was appointed as the new president of the club.

==== Promotion to the top flight ====
In 2026, Kelantan Red Warrior secured promotion to the Malaysia Super League for the first time in their history.

== Kit manufacturers and shirt sponsors ==
Since 2025, the club had a kit deal with Warrix worth RM 1 million for two seasons.

Period	Kit manufacturer	Shirt sponsor (chest)
2025–2027	(Thailand) Warrix	Nasken Coffee

== Stadium ==
Coordinates	Location	Stadium	Capacity	Year
6°7′26″N 102°14′36″E	Kota Bharu	Sultan Muhammad IV Stadium	30,000	2025–present

== Players ==
=== First-team squad ===
As of 22 August 2026

Note: Flags indicate national team as defined under FIFA eligibility rules; some limited exceptions apply. Players may hold more than one non-FIFA nationality.

No.	Pos.	Nation	Player
4	DF	MAS	Arham Khussyairi (captain)
13	DF	MAS	Latiff Suhaimi
14	DF	MAS	Syafiq Izzudin
16	GK	MAS	Harif Hazli
17	FW	NGR	Musa Dandada
18	MF	MAS	Faiz Nasir
21	MF	MAS	Zuasyraf Zulkiefle
23	MF	MAS	Muhaimin Izuddin
24	MF	CMR	Emmanuel Mbarga
27	DF	MAS	Aikal Daniel

No.	Pos.	Nation	Player
29	DF	MAS	Nazmi Cik Ani
31	GK	MAS	Amin Faisal
32	DF	MAS	Iskandar Shah
41	MF	MAS	Niam Mulhassan
42	DF	MAS	Mazwan Che Mat
48	FW	MAS	Syamil Sulaiman
73	MF	MAS	Adib Aiman
76	DF	MAS	Muhammad Faudzi
79	DF	MAS	Aiman Joanny
96	FW	MAS	Rizuan Muda

== Management and staff ==
As of 23 August 2026

=== Management ===
The following have been the presidents of the club's board of directors:

Period	President
21 December 2024–2 August 2025	(Malaysia) Nik Hafiz Naim Nik Hassan
18 August 2025–present	(Malaysia) Zaki Harun

=== Tecnical staff ===
Position	Name
Head coach	(Malaysia) Irfan Bakti Abu Salim
Assistant coach	(Malaysia) Kamarudin Anuar
Goalkeeper coach	(Malaysia) Yusran Mat Sharif
Fitness coach	(Malaysia) Ghazali Husin
Team Analyst	(Malaysia) Sideek Samsudin
Team Doctor	(Malaysia) Wan Aiman Wan Ab Rahman
Physiotherapist	(Malaysia) Wan Muhammad Farid
Masseur	(Malaysia) Ghazali Husin
Kitman	(Malaysia) Ridhuwan Mansor
Team Security	(Malaysia) Suhaimi Mat Nor
Team Media	(Malaysia) Fadhli Sukardi

=== Management ===
Position	Name
Chairman	(Malaysia) Mohd Nassuruddin Daud
President	(Malaysia) Zaki Harun
Chief executive officer	(Malaysia) Wan Mohd Fajarul Ekram
Chief operating officer	(Malaysia) Nik Khuzaimi Nudin
Team Manager	(Malaysia) Nazif Ab Aziz

== Managerial history ==
As of match played 26 October 2025

List of Kelantan Red Warrior coaches
Name	From	To	M	W	D	L	GF	GA	Win %	Ref
(Malaysia) Irfan Bakti Abu Salim	16 January 2025	present	9	3	4	2	16	5	33.33	

== Season by season record ==
As of May 2026

Season	League										FA Cup	Malaysia Cup	Top goalscorer	
Season	Division	Tier	P	W	D	L	F	A	Pts	Pos	FA Cup	Malaysia Cup	Name	Goals
2025–26	A1	2	28	17	5	6	64	15	56	4th	–	–	Emmanuel Mbarga	32
2026–27	Super League	1												

Champions	Runners-up	Third Place	Promoted	Relegated

- P = Played
- W = Games won
- D = Games drawn
- L = Games lost
- F = Goals for
- A = Goals against
- Pts = Points
- Pos = Final position
- A1 = Malaysia A1 Semi-Pro League
- QR1 = First Qualifying Round
- QR2 = Second Qualifying Round
- QR3 = Third Qualifying Round
- QR4 = Fourth Qualifying Round
- RInt = Intermediate Round
- R1 = Round 1
- R2 = Round 2
- R3 = Round 3
- R4 = Round 4
- R5 = Round 5
- R6 = Round 6
- GR = Group Stage
- QF = Quarter-finals
- SF = Semi-finals
- RU = Runners-up
- S = Shared
- W = Winners

== See also ==
- Kelantan and Kelantan Red Warrior Conflict
