= Kuching City F.C. =

Malaysian football club in Kuching, Sarawak

Kuching City
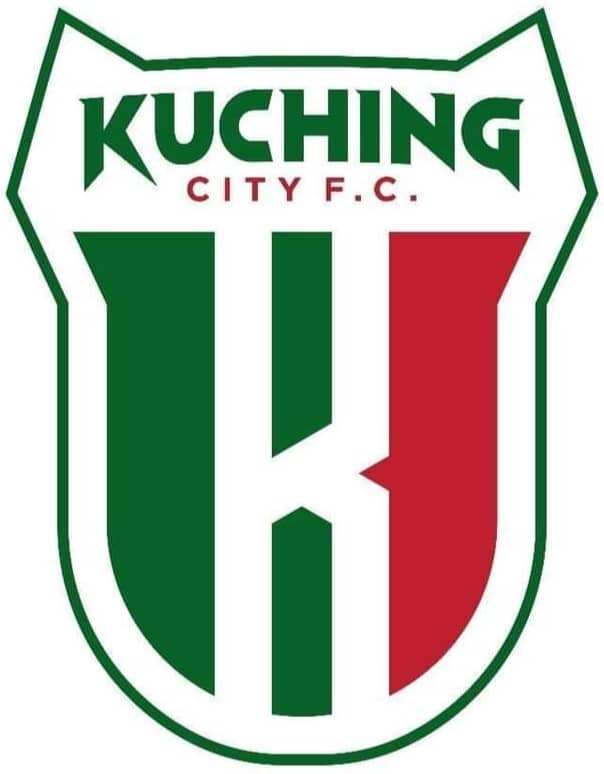
- Full name: Kuching City Football Club
- Nickname: Il Gatto (The Cats)
- Short name: KUC, KCG, KCFC
- Founded: 2015; 11 years ago as Kuching FA; 2021; 5 years ago as Kuching City
- Ground: Taha Ariffin Stadium
- Capacity: 17,584
- Co-owner: Fazzrudin Abdul Rahman; Kamaludin Akil
- CEO: Iswandi Ali Hassan
- Head coach: Aidil Sharin Sahak
- League: Malaysia Super League
- 2025–26: Malaysia Super League, 2nd of 13 (As of 2025/26 Season)
- Website: kuchingcityfc.com
Home colours	Away colours

Kuching City Football Club, simply known as Kuching City, is a professional football club based in Kuching, Sarawak, Malaysia that currently plays in the Malaysia Super League. It was the youngest club to join the highest level of the Malaysian football league system, having been founded since 2015. It is the third professional football club based in the state of Sarawak, after former state football club Sarawak FA and another defunct club Sarawak United.

== History ==
=== As Kuching FA (2015–2020) ===
In 2015, with the commencement of the People's Football League introduced by the Football Association of Malaysia, the purpose of the league was to transform lower leagues in Malaysia and promote amateur football in all districts and states across Malaysia. Consequently, Kuching F.A. was founded alongside it to represent the district of Kuching in Sarawak.

==== FAM Cup ====
In the 2015–16 Liga Bolasepak Rakyat, Kuching won the inaugural edition after beating Padang Besar 3–1 at the Selayang Stadium. With the championship, Kuching got an automatic promotion into the 2017 Piala FAM.

In their first season in FAM League, Kuching achieved 4th place in Group B, qualifying the team for the play-offs. They were knocked out in the quarter-final stage by UKM, which later gained promotion to 2018 Malaysia Premier League as finalist of the play-offs. Kuching's second season in the FAM League saw them in the 4th place in Group A, the same as previous season. Unfortunately, changes in the play-off qualifying saw them miss out on the knock-out stage as only top two teams of each group chosen. Kuching were registered to play in the 2019 Malaysia FAM Cup, but were also invited by FAM to play in the 2019 Malaysia Premier League, as a number of teams pull out from the league.

After announcing their promotion to the 2020 Malaysia Premier League, Kuching changed their kit to a new one to kick start their new journey, the colours are green with white stripes and "City of Unity" is written in the middle of the kit. The following season, they added ''City'' to back of Kuching.

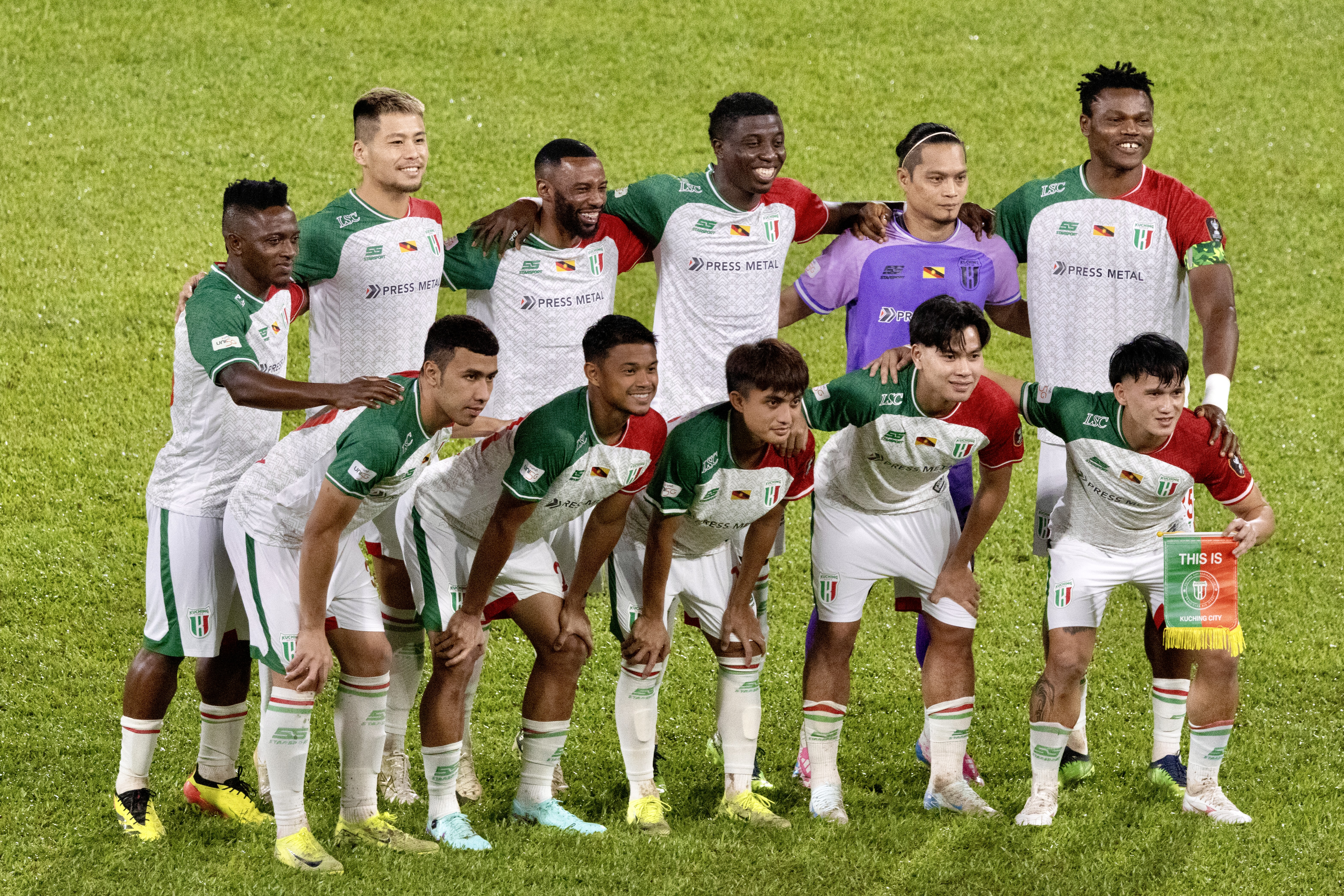
Kuching City players playing a friendly match against Bruneian club DPMM on 4 January 2025.

=== As Kuching City (2021–present) ===
==== First cup final ====
Kuching City were promoted to the 2023 Malaysia Super League for the first time in history after their MFL License was approved for the 2023 season. On 2 August 2023, former Singaporean legend, Aidil Sharin Sahak was announced as the new head coach for the club signing Namibia captain, Petrus Shitembi and Tajikistani midfielder Nuriddin Davronov. Aidil Sharin guided the club to a great run in the 2023 MFL Challenge Cup winning 4–0 on aggregate against his former club, Kedah Darul Aman in the quarter-finals, a 3–1 on aggregate against Kelantan United in the semi-finals which saw the club first ever cup final in their history.

==== AFC Champions League Two debut ====
Kuching City then finished the 2025–26 Malaysia Super League as runners-up with 53 points thus seeing the club qualified for the 2026–27 ASEAN Club Championship and the 2026–27 AFC Champions League Two for the first time in the club history. In the club debut ASEAN Club Championship, they were draw in Group A alongside both Thai club Buriram United and Ratchaburi, Vietnamese club Công An Hồ Chí Minh City, Singaporean club Tampines Rovers and Indonesian club Borneo Samarinda. While in the club debut continental competition, Kuching City was then placed in Group H of the AFC Champions League Two alongside Korean club Gangwon, Hong Kong club Kitchee and Cambodian club Phnom Penh Crown.

== Team image ==
=== Crest and colours ===
Kuching's crest has a yellow shield and the flag of Sarawak where the club originated from, and a green-white stripped tiger. "City of Unity" is written in the middle of the crest.

2019–2021

=== Supporters ===
Ultras IL Gatto; An ultras group associated with Kuching City as the club main ultras group which established in 2020. The group is known for its organised chanting and active support during matches.

KNG II Gato; Also known as Kuro Neko Gang (KNG), a Kuching City supporters' group based at the club's home matches. The group is involved in chanting and drumline activities and has been among the organised supporters backing the club.

GB13; A supporters' group originally associated with Sarawak FA and later Sarawak United. Established in 2011, GB13 became associated with Kuching City in 2024 after announcing its support for the club alongside KNG II Gato.

Stand of Unity: A collective supporters' section bringing together Kuching City supporters from different backgrounds. The group is known for continuous chanting and coordinated support throughout matches, particularly at the Taha Ariffin Stadium.

== Stadium ==
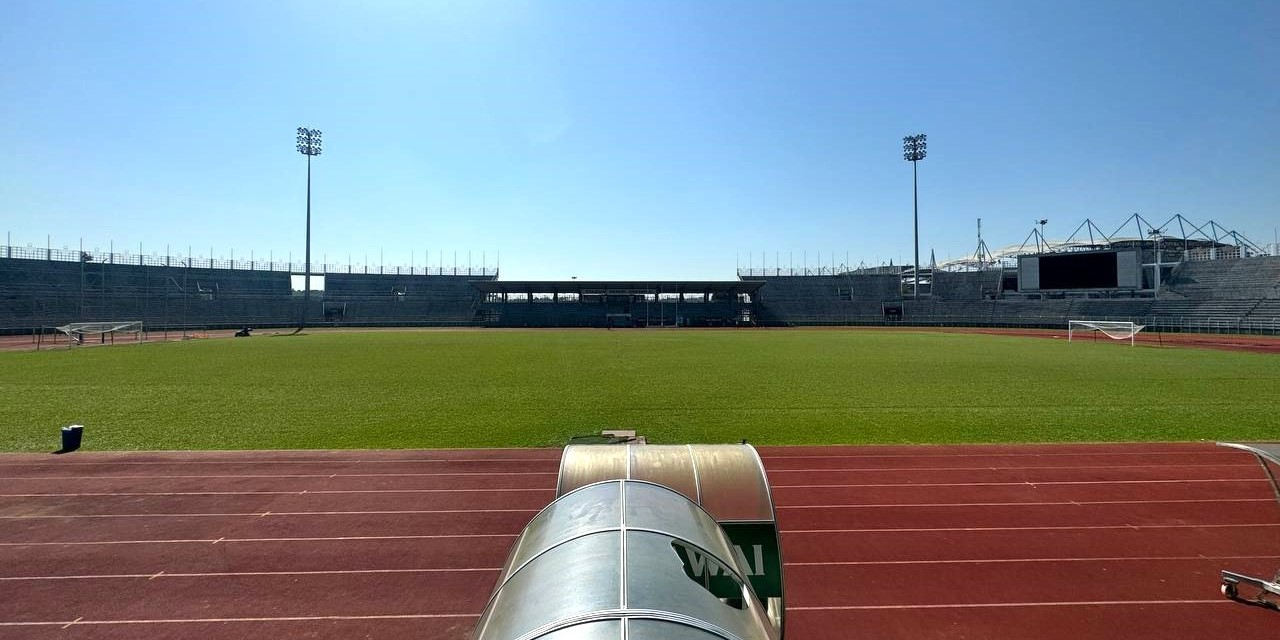
Taha Ariffin Stadium

Kuching City has used Taha Ariffin Stadium in Kuching as its home ground since 2015. Formerly known as Sarawak State Stadium, it is one of the major football venues in the city. The stadium has a seating capacity of approximately 26,000 spectators, making it one of the larger stadiums in Sarawak. The stadium also host Kuching City's league matches and other domestic football competitions. The stadium is also an important part of Kuching’s football culture, regularly attracting local supporters on match days.

The stadium was renamed Taha Ariffin Stadium in honour of Datuk Taha Ariffin, a prominent figure in the development of football in Sarawak. Taha Ariffin was involved in the administration of the Football Association of Sarawak (FAS) and played an important role in the development of Sarawak football during the late 20th century. Contemporary accounts describe him as a key figure in the establishment and development of the state's football administration.

== Kit manufacturers and shirt sponsors ==
Season	Kit manufacturer	Shirt sponsor
2017	Starsport	Kuching City of Unity
2018–2020	Starsport	LSC & Kuching City of Unity
2021	Starsport	Serba Dinamik, LSC & Yakult
2022	Starsport	Kuching City of Unity, LSC, Yakult & Fitogether
2023	Starsport	Kuching City of Unity & LSC
2024–2025	Starsport	Press Metal, LSC & Kuching City of Unity
2025–2026	Starsport	Press Metal, LSC & Kuching City of Unity
2026–present	Starsport	AirBorneo, Affin Bank, Press Metal, & LSC

== Players ==
=== First-team squad ===
As of September 2026

Note: Flags indicate national team as defined under FIFA eligibility rules; some limited exceptions apply. Players may hold more than one non-FIFA nationality.

No.	Pos.	Nation	Player
1	GK	MAS	Haziq Nadzli
2	DF	MAS	Jimmy Raymond
3	DF	MAS	Rodney Celvin
4	DF	BRA	Gabriel Peres
5	MF	MAS	Ryan Lambert (on loan from Johor Darul Ta'zim)
6	DF	MAS	Arif Fadzilah
7	FW	MAS	Ramadhan Saifullah
8	MF	MAS	Nazmi Faiz Mansor (on loan from Johor Darul Ta'zim)
10	MF	NAM	Petrus Shitembi
11	FW	CMR	Jerome Mpacko Etame
12	FW	AUS	Dylan Wenzel-Halls
14	FW	MAS	Amir Amri
17	DF	MAS	Irfan Zakaria
18	FW	CMR	Ronald Ngah
19	FW	MAS	Gabriel Nistelrooy (on loan from Johor Darul Ta'zim)
20	GK	MAS	Haziq Aiman
21	DF	MAS	Declan Lambert (on loan from Johor Darul Ta'zim)

No.	Pos.	Nation	Player
22	MF	TLS	João Pedro
23	DF	MAS	Ariff Farhan Isa
24	FW	BIH	Ajdin Mujagić (on loan from Johor Darul Ta'zim)
27	DF	MAS	Filemon Anyie
29	FW	MAS	Safawi Rasid (on loan from Johor Darul Ta'zim)
35	DF	NGR	James Okwuosa (captain)
39	FW	MAS	Zharmein Ashraf
44	MF	MAS	Alif Hassan
50	MF	MAS	Diego Baggio
55	GK	MAS	Shahril Saa'ri
60	DF	MAS	Yohanis Daniel
67	MF	MAS	Shamie Iszuan
77	DF	JPN	Yuki Tanigawa
80	MF	MAS	Wesley Azcang Milkias
86	GK	MAS	Wan Azraie
88	MF	JPN	Kaishu Yamazaki
99	MF	JOR	Ahmad Israiwah
—	FW	BRA	Chrigor Moraes
—	MF	SGP	Jacob Mahler
—	DF	MAS	Sam Bone

==== Out on loan ====
Note: Flags indicate national team as defined under FIFA eligibility rules; some limited exceptions apply. Players may hold more than one non-FIFA nationality.

No.	Pos.	Nation	Player

== Development squads ==
=== Kuching City II (U20) ===
Head coach: (Malaysia) Hakimi Man

As of 18 April 2025

Note: Flags indicate national team as defined under FIFA eligibility rules; some limited exceptions apply. Players may hold more than one non-FIFA nationality.

No.	Pos.	Nation	Player
—	GK	MAS	Syafie Mursalim
—	GK	MAS	Naim Ramadhan Narawi
—	DF	MAS	Abang Haikal Za'afari
—	DF	MAS	Haddad Aiman Sufian
—	DF	MAS	Fadzly Shauqie Jeffry
—	DF	MAS	Mohd Hazazi Harsi
—	DF	MAS	Nasharuddin Jaapar Sidik
—	DF	MAS	Nur Hasbullah Rahman
—	DF	MAS	Josef Charsel Setom
—	DF	MAS	Awang Nazmi Shamel

No.	Pos.	Nation	Player
—	DF	MAS	Gabriel Batistuta Durling
—	MF	MAS	Faris Mohd Faidillah
—	MF	MAS	Adifbadri Ariffin
—	MF	MAS	Syahryl Aiman Saidin
—	MF	MAS	Mohd Khuzairi Abdullah
—	MF	MAS	Azkaharridhi Farhan Hasnan
—	FW	MAS	Cornelius Ornley Jina
—	FW	MAS	Mohammad Rahiimin Roslan
—	FW	MAS	Jeckelly Manir
—	FW	MAS	Shane Thomas

== Management and staff ==
As of July 2026

Position	Name
President & CEO	(Malaysia) Iswandi Ali Hassan
Technical director	(Malaysia) Wan Jamak Wan Hassan
Manager	(Malaysia) Irwanshah Mohamad
Head coach	(Singapore) Aidil Sharin Sahak
Assistant coach	(Malaysia) Zulkarnien Mohamad Poasa
Assistant coach	(Belarus) Oleg Kuzmianok
Goalkeeping coach	(Malaysia) Khairul Azman Mohamed
Fitness coach	(Malaysia) Azmi Ibrahim
Video analyst	(Malaysia) Ahmad Mundir
Team doctor	(Malaysia) Muhamad Karbela Reza Ramlan
Physiotherapist	(Malaysia) Mohd Khairul Nizam Suhaimi
Physiotherapist	(Malaysia) Ferdinand Lisa
Media officer	(Malaysia) Darul Imran Azmi
Masseur	(Malaysia) Mohamed Zawawi Ali Hassan
Masseur	(Malaysia) Mohd Shahrizan Sahari
Kitman	(Malaysia) Azarul Nazriq Bolhi

Position	Name
Manager	(Malaysia) Ahmad Zaki Zaidi ^{U20}
Assistant manager	(Malaysia) Awang Azami Awang Idris ^{U20}
Head coach	(Malaysia) Hakimi Man ^{U20}
Assistant coach	(Malaysia) Joseph Kalang Tie ^{U20} (Malaysia) Nizam Mahmud ^{U20}
Goalkeeping coach	(Malaysia) Abdul Gani Anuar ^{U20}
Fitness coach	(Malaysia) Michael Wong ^{U20}
Team admin	(Malaysia) Roja James ^{U20}
Media officer	(Malaysia) Mohd Adib Marsat ^{U20}
Physiotherapist	(Malaysia) Gary Nyelang ^{U20}
Masseur	(Malaysia) Padil Abet ^{U20}
Kitman	(Malaysia) Saiful Abdullah ^{U20}

== Honours ==
=== Domestic ===
League

- Division 1/Super League
  - Runners-up (1): 2025–26
- Division 2/Premier League
  - Promotion (1): 2022
- Division 3/M3 League
  - Runners-up (1): 2019
  - Promotion Play-offs Winners: 2019
- Division 4/Liga Bolasepak Rakyat
  - Winners: 2015–16

Cup

- Malaysia Cup
  - Runners-up (1): 2026
- MFL Challenge Cup
  - Runners-up (1): 2023
- Piala Sumbangsih
  - Runners-up (1): 2026

== Award winners ==
=== Domestic ===
- League Golden Boot
  - (Liberia) Abu Kamara (2022)
- Coach of the Season
  - (Singapore) Aidil Sharin Sahak (2024–25)
- Team of the Season
  - (Malaysia) Danial Amier (2024–25, 2025–26)
  - (Malaysia) Jimmy Raymond (2024–25)
  - (Brazil) Nando Welter (2024–25)
  - (Malaysia) Haziq Nazli (2025–26)
  - (Malaysia) Rodney Celvin (2025–26)
  - (Nigeria) James Okwuosa (2025–26)
  - (Namibia) Petrus Shitembi (2025–26)
  - (Malaysia) Ramadhan Saifullah (2025–26)

== Notable players ==
=== International capped players ===
AFC/OFC.: (Bahrain) Moses Atede; (Jordan) Ahmad Israiwah; (Philippines) Julian Schwarzer; (Philippines) Scott Woods; (Timor-Leste) João Pedro; (Timor-Leste) Pedro Henrique	CAF.: (Burkina Faso) Sudi Abdallah; (Cameroon) Ronald Ngah; (Liberia) Abu Kamara; (Namibia) Petrus Shitembi; (Nigeria) James Okwuosa	UEFA.: (Bosnia and Herzegovina) Ajdin Mujagić	CONMEBOL/ CONCACAF.: (Guyana) Keanu Marsh-Brown

== Managerial history ==
Manager	Period	Achievements
(Malaysia) Lucas Kalang Laeng	January 2017–December 2017	
(Malaysia) Fairuz Yunus	January 2018–December 2018	
(Malaysia) Ideris Utong	January 2019–December 2019	
(Japan) Akira Higashiyama	January 2020–5 December 2020	
(Malaysia) Irfan Bakti	21 January 2021–18 July 2023	
(Malaysia) Firdaus Morshidi	21 July 2023–1 August 2023	
(Singapore) Aidil Sharin Sahak	2 August 2023–present	

== Season by season record ==
As of 21 August 2026

Season	Division	Position	Malaysia Cup	Malaysia FA Cup	Malaysia Challenge Cup	Malaysia Charity Shield	AFC Champions League Two	ASEAN Club Championship	Top scorer (All Competitions)
2015–16	Liga LBR	Champions	DNQ	–	–	–	–	–	
2017	FAM League	4th of 7 Group B	DNQ	–	–	–	–	–	
2018	FAM League	4th of 7 Group A	DNQ	Second round	–	–	–	–	(Malaysia) Shafitri Salim (4)
2019	Liga M3	Runners-up	DNQ	Second round	–	–	–	–	(Malaysia) Joseph Kalang Tie (18)
2020	Premier League	4th	Cancelled	Cancelled	–	–	–	–	(Brazil) Bryan Jones (4)
2021	Premier League	5th	3rd of 4th Group stage B	Not held	–	–	–	–	(Malaysia) Alif Hassan (6)
2022	Premier League	3rd	Quarter-finals	Quarter-finals	–	–	–	–	(Liberia) Abu Kamara (12)
2023	Super League	13th	Round 16	Second Round	Runners-up	–	–	–	(Liberia) Abu Kamara (16)
2024–25	Super League	4th	Quarter-finals	Quarter-finals	–	–	–	–	(Malaysia) Jordan Mintah (15)
2025–26	Super League	Runners-up	Runners-up	Semi-finals	–	–	–	–	(Cameroon) Ronald Ngah (22)
2026–27	Super League					Runners-up			

=== Continental record ===
- AFC Champions League Two
  2026–27: Group stage

==== List of matches ====
All results list Kuching's goal tally first.

Season	Competition	Round	Club	Home	Away	Aggregate
2026–27	AFC Champions League Two	Group H	(Cambodia) Phnom Penh Crown		1–2	
2026–27	AFC Champions League Two	Group H	(Hong Kong) Kitchee	1–1		
2026–27	AFC Champions League Two	Group H	(South Korea) Gangwon FC	2–0	0–1	

=== Regional record ===
==== List of matches ====
All results list Kuching's goal tally first.

Season	Competition	Round	Club	Home	Away	Aggregate
2026–27	ASEAN Club Championship	Group A	(Singapore) Tampines Rovers	2–2	—N/a	
2026–27	ASEAN Club Championship	Group A	(Indonesia) Borneo Samarinda		—N/a	
2026–27	ASEAN Club Championship	Group A	(Vietnam) Công An Hồ Chí Minh City	—N/a		
2026–27	ASEAN Club Championship	Group A	(Thailand) Buriram United		—N/a	
2026–27	ASEAN Club Championship	Group A	(Philippines) Manila Digger	—N/a		
2026–27	ASEAN Club Championship	Group A	(Thailand) Ratchaburi	—N/a		
