= 2023 Piala Sumbangsih =

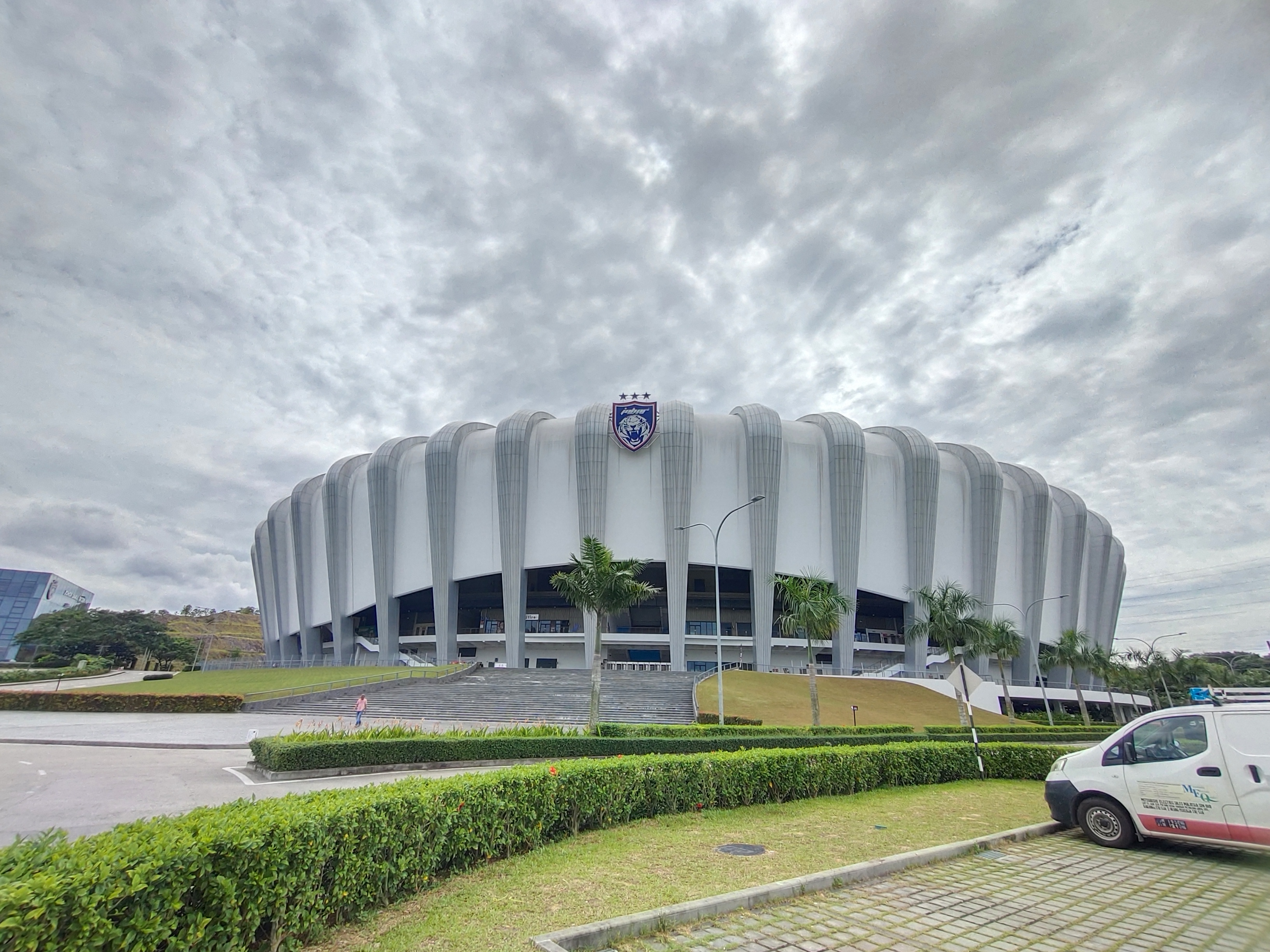
- Sultan Ibrahim Stadium was scheduled to host the match
Johor Darul Ta'zim	Terengganu
2	0
- Date: 24 February 2023
- Venue: Sultan Ibrahim Stadium, Iskandar Puteri, Johor
- Man of the Match: Jordi Amat (Johor Darul Ta'zim)
- Referee: Suhaizi Shukri
- Attendance: 31,889

The 2023 Piala Sumbangsih (also known as Malaysian Charity Shield) was the scheduled 38th edition of the Malaysian Charity Shield, an annual football match played between the winners of the previous season's Malaysia Super League and Malaysia FA Cup. It took place at Sultan Ibrahim Stadium on 24 February 2023. As Johor Darul Ta'zim won the domestic treble (Note: Winners of the 2022 Malaysia Super League, 2022 Malaysia FA Cup, and 2022 Malaysia Cup.) in the previous season, their opponents were the Super League runners-up, Terengganu.

Johor Darul Ta'zim defended the trophy they won in 2022, beating Terengganu 2–0 with both goals scored by Juan Muñiz and Bérgson. That match was also the first game in the league for both teams.

== Background ==
Johor Darul Ta'zim (JDT) qualified for the 2023 Piala Sumbangsih as winners of the 2022 Malaysia Super League. Previously, they won the 2022 Malaysia FA Cup against the same opponent, and later they faced Selangor in the 2022 Malaysia Cup final, on course to complete a continental treble. JDT defeated Selangor 2–1 to win their third Malaysia Cup and as a result, Terengganu qualified for the 2023 Charity Shield as Super League runners-up.

Terengganu were looking to win the Charity Shield for the first time since 2001, when they beat Perak 4–0. Their last appearance was in 2002, when they were defeated by Selangor 2–1.

== Match details ==
24 February 2023
21:00 MYT

Johor Darul Ta'zim	2–0	Terengganu
Muñiz 5'; Bérgson 57'	Report

Sultan Ibrahim Stadium, Iskandar Puteri
Attendance: 31,889
Referee: Suhaizi Shukri

Johor Darul Ta'zim	Terengganu

GK	33	(Malaysia) Syihan Hazmi
RB	2	(Malaysia) Matthew Davies
CB	15	(Malaysia) Feroz Baharudin		(substituted off) 75'
CB	5	(Indonesia) Jordi Amat (c)
LB	24	(Spain) Óscar Arribas	(yellow card) 68'	(substituted off) 87'
CM	4	(Malaysia) Afiq Fazail
CM	6	(England) Hong Wan
RW	42	(Malaysia) Arif Aiman
AM	20	(Spain) Juan Muñiz		(substituted off) 63'
LW	45	(Italy) Fernando Forestieri		(substituted off) 87'
CF	9	(Brazil) Bérgson
Substitutes:
GK	1	(Malaysia) Farizal Marlias
DF	22	(Malaysia) La'Vere Corbin-Ong		(substituted on) 87'
DF	32	(Malaysia) Shahrul Saad		(substituted on) 75'
DF	91	(Malaysia) Syahmi Safari
MF	10	(Argentina) Leandro Velázquez		(substituted on) 63'
MF	23	(Malaysia) Endrick
FW	17	(Malaysia) Ramadhan Saifullah		(substituted on) 87'
FW	19	(Malaysia) Akhyar Rashid
FW	28	(Malaysia) Syafiq Ahmad
Coach:
(Argentina) Esteban Solari

GK	1	(Malaysia) Suhaimi Husin
RB	6	(Malaysia) Azam Azmi
CB	5	(Malaysia) Shahrul Nizam (c)
CB	3	(Uzbekistan) Sardor Kulmatov
LB	20	(Malaysia) Hairiey Hakim		(substituted off) 71'
DM	13	(Malaysia) Zuasyraf Zulkiefle		(substituted off) 89'
RM	9	(Thailand) Adisak Kraisorn		(substituted off) 46'
CM	8	(Croatia) Domagoj Pušić
LM	25	(Malaysia) Alif Zakaria
SS	11	(Haiti) Sony Nordé
CF	7	(Croatia) Ivan Mamut	(yellow card) 62'	(substituted off) 89'
Substitutes:
GK	1	(Malaysia) Rahadiazli Rahalim
DF	4	(Malaysia) Adib Zainudin
DF	24	(Malaysia) Safwan Mazlan		(substituted on) 71'
DF	27	(Malaysia) Azarul Nazarith
DF	36	(Montenegro) Argzim Redžović
FW	16	(Malaysia) Hakimi Abdullah
FW	19	(Malaysia) Syafik Ismail		(substituted on) 46'
FW	22	(Malaysia) Engku Nur Shakir		(substituted on) 89'
FW	88	(Malaysia) Nik Sharif Haseefy		(substituted on) 89'
Coach:
(Croatia) Tomislav Steinbrückner

Man of the Match:
Jordi Amat (Johor Darul Ta'zim)

Assistant referees:
Anuar Musa Abdul Majid
Farhan Abdul Aziz
Fourth official:
Firdaus Dahlan

Match rules

- 90 minutes
- 30 minutes of extra time if necessary
- Penalty shoot-out if scores still level
- Nine named substitutes
- Maximum of five substitutions, with a sixth allowed in extra time (Note: Each team was given only three opportunities to make substitutions, with a fourth opportunity in extra time, excluding substitutions made at half-time, before the start of extra time and at half-time in extra time.)
