= 2023 Terengganu FC season =

Terengganu
2023 season
- President: Hishamuddin Abdul Karim
- CEO: Mohd Sabri Abas
- Head coach: Tomislav Steinbrückner
- Stadium: Sultan Mizan Zainal Abidin Stadium
- Malaysia Super League: 6th
- Malaysia FA Cup: Semi-finals
- Malaysia Cup: Runners-up
- Piala Sumbangsih: Runners-up
- AFC Cup: Group Stage
- Top goalscorer: League: Ivan Mamut (11); All: Ivan Mamut (24)
- Average home league attendance: 7,000
Home colours	Away colours	Third colours

The 2023 season was Terengganu's Sixth season in the Malaysia Super League having been promoted from the Malaysia Premier League at the end of the 2016 season. The club will also participate in the Malaysia FA Cup, Malaysia Cup, Piala Sumbangsih and AFC Cup.

== Management and staff ==
Club Management
President	(Malaysia) Hishamuddin Abdul Karim
Chief Executive Officer	(Malaysia) Mohd Sabri Abas
Team Manager	(Malaysia) Fazil Wahab
Asst. Team Manager	(Malaysia) Kamrol Isam Mohd
Head coach	(Croatia) Tomislav Steinbrückner
Asst. Head Coach	(Croatia) Ivica Vranjes
Assistant Coach	(Malaysia) Badrul Afzan Razali
Goalkeeper Coach	(Croatia) Damagoj Malovan
Fitness Coach	(Croatia) Hrvoje Bradasic
Assistant Fitness Coach	(Malaysia) Efindy Salleh
Team Doctor	(Malaysia) Lee Leong Tiong
Physiotherapist	(Malaysia) Zulkifli Mohd Zin
Team Analyst	(Malaysia) Amirul Mustaqim
Masseurs	(Malaysia) Muhammad Lee Soong Keen
Masseurs	(Malaysia) Faiz Manja
Kitman	(Malaysia) Fakhruddin Mohamad
Kitman	(Malaysia) Md Fuzi Ismail

== Players ==
=== First-team squad ===
As of 7 December 2023

Note: Flags indicate national team as defined under FIFA eligibility rules; some limited exceptions apply. Players may hold more than one non-FIFA nationality.

No.	Pos.	Nation	Player
1	GK	MAS	Rahadiazli Rahalim ^{U23}
2	DF	MAS	Arif Fadzilah Abu Bakar
3	DF	UZB	Sardor Kulmatov ^{A}
4	DF	MAS	Adib Zainudin
5	DF	MAS	Shahrul Nizam Ros Hasni (captain)
6	DF	MAS	Azam Azmi Murad ^{U23}
7	FW	CRO	Ivan Mamut ^{I}
8	MF	MAS	Liridon Krasniqi (on loan from Johor Darul Ta'zim)
10	MF	BHR	Habib Haroon ^{A}
11	FW	HAI	Sony Nordé ^{I}
13	MF	MAS	Zuasyraf Zulkiefle
14	MF	MAS	Amirul Syazwan
16	MF	MAS	Hakimi Abdullah
17	DF	MAS	Syafiq Danial
18	MF	MAS	Syaiful Haqim
19	MF	MAS	Syafik Ismail ^{U23}

No.	Pos.	Nation	Player
20	DF	MAS	Hairiey Hakim Mamat
21	GK	MAS	Shafawi Mohamad
22	FW	MAS	Nur Shakir Yacob
23	DF	MAS	Aqil Irfanuddin Sabri
24	DF	MAS	Safwan Mazlan ^{U23}
25	DF	MAS	Alif Zakaria
26	DF	MAS	Firdaus Rusdi
29	GK	MAS	Syed Muhammad Nasrulhaq
32	MF	MAS	Ubaidullah Shamsul
33	FW	MAS	Fazli Ghazali
36	DF	MNE	Argzim Redžović ^{I}
38	GK	MAS	Suhaimi Husin
46	MF	MAS	Syahmi Zamri
69	FW	MAS	Nor Hakim Hassan
88	MF	MAS	Sharif Haseefy Lazim
97	MF	UZB	Nurillo Tukhtasinov

Remarks:
^{I} These players are registered as International player.
^{A} These players are registered as Asian player.
^{S} These players are registered as ASEAN player.
^{U23} These players are registered as Under-23 player.
^{U19} These players are registered as Under-19 player.

=== Out on loan ===
Note: Flags indicate national team as defined under FIFA eligibility rules; some limited exceptions apply. Players may hold more than one non-FIFA nationality.

No.	Pos.	Nation	Player
20	FW	MAS	Rahmat Makasuf (on loan at Penang)
27	DF	MAS	Azarul Nazarith (on loan at Kelantan United)
15	MF	MAS	Faiz Nasir (on loan at Kelantan United)

== Friendly ==
=== Pre-season and friendlies ===
2023 Thailand Tour (7 – 14 February)

8 February 2023 Friendly	Rajpracha (Thailand)	1–1	(Malaysia) Terengganu	Bangkok
				Stadium: RBAC University Stadium

9 February 2023 Friendly	Bangkok (Thailand)	0–2	(Malaysia) Terengganu	Bangkok
				Stadium: RBAC University Stadium

12 February 2023 Friendly	OB (Denmark)	2–0	(Malaysia) Terengganu	Pathum
	Emmanuel Sabbi; Agon Muçolli			Stadium: BG Pathum Stadium

13 February 2023 Friendly	Chonburi (Thailand)	0–1	(Malaysia) Terengganu	Chonburi
				Stadium: Chonburi Stadium

== Competitions ==
Win Draw Loss Postponed

=== Malaysia Super League ===
24 February 2023 1	Johor Darul Ta'zim	2–0	Terengganu	Iskandar Puteri
21:00 UTC+8	Muñiz 5'; Bérgson 57'; Arribas (yellow card) 68'	Report	Mamut (yellow card) 62'	Stadium: Sultan Ibrahim Stadium; Attendance: 31,889; Referee: Suhaizi Shukri

1 March 2023 2	Kedah Darul Aman	1–0	Terengganu	Alor Setar
21:00 UTC+8	Fadzrul 90'	Report	Mamut (yellow card) 67'	Stadium: Darul Aman Stadium; Attendance: 21,700; Referee: S. Logeswaran

5 March 2023 3	Terengganu	0–0	Kuala Lumpur City	Kuala Terengganu
21:00 UTC+8	Kulmatov (yellow card) 75'	Report	Akram (yellow card) 90+3'	Stadium: Sultan Mizan Zainal Abidin Stadium; Attendance: 11,560; Referee: Mohammad Zamzaidi Katimin

11 March 2023 4	Terengganu	1–0	PDRM	Kuala Terengganu
21:00 UTC+8	Kulmatov (yellow card) 41', (goal) 76'; Alif (yellow card) 45+1'; Haroon (yellow card) 56'	Report	Dzulfahmi (yellow card) 16'; Ramadhan (red card) 45+2'; Amir (yellow card) 57'; Izaaq (yellow card) 80'	Stadium: Sultan Mizan Zainal Abidin Stadium; Attendance: 9,020; Referee: Jeevanathan M. Ponniamoorthy

16 March 2023 5	Negeri Sembilan	2–1	Terengganu	Paroi
20:15 UTC+8	Madinda 28'; Casagrande 67'; Aroon (yellow card) 79'	Report	Haroon (yellow card) 9'; Adisak 45+2'	Stadium: Tuanku Abdul Rahman Stadium; Attendance: 3,203; Referee: Ahmad Zuhaidi Dzulkifli

31 March 2023 6	Terengganu	2–1	Kelantan United	Kuala Terengganu
22:00 UTC+8	Krasniqi 6'; Mintah 28', (yellow card) 45+3'; Kulmatov (yellow card) 62'	Report	Sharvin (yellow card) 35'; Ariff (yellow card) 37'; Khairu (yellow card) 42'; Porteria 76'	Stadium: Sultan Mizan Zainal Abidin Stadium; Attendance: 4,250; Referee: Muhammad Usaid Jamal

4 April 2023 7	Terengganu	5–0	Kelantan	Kuala Terengganu
22:00 UTC+8	Mintah 16'; Adisak 21'; Mamut 67' (pen.), 90+1'; Hakimi 90+3'	Report	Arip (yellow card) 47'	Stadium: Sultan Mizan Zainal Abidin Stadium; Attendance: 5,025; Referee: Abdul Rahman Wahab

9 April 2023 8	Terengganu	2–0	Kuching City	Kuala Terengganu
22:00 UTC+8	Mintah 22', 53'; Shahrul (yellow card) 85'	Report	Kuziyev (yellow card) 29'; Hidhir (yellow card) 89'	Stadium: Sultan Mizan Zainal Abidin Stadium; Attendance: 3,584; Referee: Muhammad Khairulsyahmi Ahmad Khalidi

18 April 2023 9	Selangor	5–1	Terengganu	Petaling Jaya
22:00 UTC+8	del Valle 17', 71'; Faisal 21'; Harith 40'; Aliff 81'	Report	Mamut 61'	Stadium: Petaling Jaya Stadium; Attendance: 5,207; Referee: Muhammad Usaid Jamal

28 April 2023 10	Terengganu	1–2	Sri Pahang	Kuala Terengganu
21:00 UTC+8	Mamut 39'	Report	Sherman 30'; Azam 68'	Stadium: Sultan Mizan Zainal Abidin Stadium; Attendance: 10,520; Referee: Mohd Nafeez Abd Wahab

19 May 2023 11	Sabah	2–2	Terengganu	Kota Kinabalu
19:30 UTC+8	Castanheira 28'; Lok 37' (pen.)	Report	Nordé 45+1', 90+4'	Stadium: Likas Stadium; Attendance: 12,096; Referee: S. Logeswaran

24 May 2023 12	Terengganu	1–0	Penang	Kuala Terengganu
21:00 UTC+8	Engku Shakir 74'	Report		Stadium: Sultan Mizan Zainal Abidin Stadium; Attendance: 3,300; Referee: Mohd Fusser Mad Sallih

3 June 2023 13	Perak	0–3	Terengganu	Ipoh
17:30 UTC+8		Report	Adisak 6'; Nordé 16'; Mintah 74'	Stadium: Perak Stadium; Attendance: 1,917; Referee: Abdul Rahman Wahab

9 June 2023 14	Terengganu	1–3	Johor Darul Ta'zim	Kuala Terengganu
21:00 UTC+8	Nordé 28'	Report	Forestieri 21'; Bérgson 45+1'; Endrick 90+4'	Stadium: Sultan Mizan Zainal Abidin Stadium; Attendance: 10,819; Referee: Mohd Fusser Mad Sallih

3 July 2023 15	Terengganu	1–0	Kedah Darul Aman	Kuala Terengganu
21:00 UTC+8	Engku Shakir 16'	Report		Stadium: Sultan Mizan Zainal Abidin Stadium; Attendance: 6,520; Referee: Zamzaidi Katimin

7 July 2023 16	Kuala Lumpur City	3–3	Terengganu	Cheras
21:00 UTC+8	Gallifuoco 36'; Josué 42'; Morales 45+1'	Report	Nazari 29'; Hakim 50'; Mamut 60'	Stadium: Kuala Lumpur Stadium; Attendance: 1,464; Referee: Razlan Joffri Ali

16 July 2023 17	PDRM	0–0	Terengganu	Petaling Jaya
21:00 UTC+8		Report		Stadium: Petaling Jaya Stadium; Attendance: 920; Referee: Muhammad Usaid Jamal

28 July 2023 18	Terengganu	1–1	Negeri Sembilan	Kuala Terengganu
21:00 UTC+8	Mamut 67'	Report	Goulon 89'	Stadium: Sultan Mizan Zainal Abidin Stadium; Attendance: 5,025; Referee: Muhammad Khairulsyahmi Ahmad Khalidi

8 August 2023 19	Kelantan Darul Naim	1–4	Terengganu	Kota Bharu
21:00 UTC+8	Akinade 86'	Report	Mamut 29' (pen.); Nordé 72'; Nik Sharif 84'; Hakimi 90+3'	Stadium: Sultan Muhammad IV Stadium; Attendance: 517; Referee: Abang Azharudin Abdullah

14 August 2023 20	Kelantan	0–8	Terengganu	Kota Bharu
21:00 UTC+8		Report	Mamut 14', 53', 66'; Tukhtasinov 28'; Nik Sharif 36'; Engku Shakir 41'; Safwan 47'; Hakimi 63'	Stadium: Sultan Muhammad IV Stadium; Attendance: 1,696; Referee: Ahmad Zuhadi Dzulkifli

26 August 2023 21	Kuching City	0–2	Terengganu	Kuching
16:45 UTC+8		Report	Nizam 42'; Engku Shakir 55'	Stadium: Sarawak State Stadium; Attendance: 248; Referee: S. Logeswaran

29 September 2023 22	Terengganu	0–4	Selangor	Kuala Terengganu
21:00 UTC+8		Report	Orozco 26', 41'; Faisal 52'; Aliff 81'	Stadium: Sultan Mizan Zainal Abidin Stadium; Attendance: 7,456; Referee: Ahmad Zuhadi Dzulkifli

29 October 2023 23	Sri Pahang	2–2	Terengganu	Kuantan
20:15 UTC+8	Rafael Silva 78'; Agüero 80'	Report	Nazari 25', 75'	Stadium: Darul Makmur Stadium; Attendance: 3,792; Referee: Razlan Joffri Ali

24 November 2023 24	Terengganu	0–4	Sabah	Kuala Terengganu
21:00 UTC+8		Report	Machado 6'; Saddil 29'; Cifu 40'; Jafri 48'	Stadium: Sultan Mizan Zainal Abidin Stadium; Attendance: 2,651; Referee: Mohd Nafeez Abd Wahab

3 December 2023 25	Penang	1–1	Terengganu	George Town
20:15 UTC+8	Rafael Vitor 90+10'	Report	Syahmi 66'	Stadium: City Stadium; Attendance: 1,348; Referee: Mohd Fairuzi Mat Desa

17 December 2023 26	Terengganu	3–0	Perak	Kuala Terengganu
21:00 UTC+8	Mamut 7'; Engku Shakir 17'; Hakim 81'	Report		Stadium: Sultan Mizan Zainal Abidin Stadium; Attendance: 11,265; Referee: Muhammad Khairulsyahmi Ahmad Khalidi

Pos	Team	Pld	W	D	L	GF	GA	GD	Pts	Qualification or relegation
4	Kedah Darul Aman	26	17	2	7	52	29	+23	53	
5	Sri Pahang	26	13	6	7	44	33	+11	45	
6	Terengganu	26	11	7	8	45	34	+11	40	Qualification for the AFF Shopee Cup group stage (Note: Qualified as the 2023 Malaysia Cup & 2023 Malaysia FA Cup runner-up.)
7	Kuala Lumpur City	26	10	8	8	44	39	+5	38	Qualification for the AFF Shopee Cup group stage
8	PDRM	26	11	4	11	35	37	−2	37	

Source: MFL
Rules for classification: 1) Points; 2) Goal difference; 3) Number of goals scored.

=== Malaysia FA Cup ===
14 April 2023 Round of 16	Terengganu	4–0	Melaka	Kuala Nerus
22:00 MYT	Mamut 6'; Hakimi 71'; Mintah 82', 90+3'	Report		Stadium: Sultan Mizan Zainal Abidin Stadium; Attendance: 5,150; Referee: Hasrol Amir

27 May 2023 Quarter-final	Terengganu	4–2	Kelantan	Kuala Nerus
17:00 MYT	Azam 17'; Mamut 41'; Nordé 52'; Syafik 82'	Report	Akinade 45', 63' (pen.)	Stadium: Sultan Mizan Zainal Abidin Stadium; Attendance: 5,263; Referee: S. Logeswaran

25 June 2023 Semi-final	Terengganu	0–0 (a.e.t.) (2–4 p)	Kuala Lumpur City	Kuala Nerus
21:00 MYT		Report		Stadium: Sultan Mizan Zainal Abidin Stadium; Attendance: 26,540; Referee: Suhaizi Shukri
	Penalties
	Arif (penalty scored); Sharif (penalty missed); Safwan (penalty scored); Krasniqi (penalty missed)		Josué (penalty scored); Morales (penalty scored); Akram (penalty scored); Zirdum (penalty missed); Gallifuoco (penalty scored)

=== Malaysia Cup ===
==== Round of 16 ====
4 August 2023 First leg	Kuala Lumpur Rovers	0–4	Terengganu	Cheras
20:15 UTC+8		Report	Mamut 18', 45+2', 67'; Engku Shakir 51'	Stadium: Kuala Lumpur Stadium; Attendance: 495; Referee: Khirulazuan Kidam

18 August 2023 Second leg	Terengganu	3–0 (7–0 agg.)	Kuala Lumpur Rovers	Kuala Terengganu
21:00 UTC+8	Hakim 31', 90'; Krasniqi 71'	Report		Stadium: Sultan Mizan Zainal Abidin Stadium; Attendance: 3,623; Referee: Mohd Fairuzi Mat Desa

==== Quarter-finals ====
16 September 2023 First leg	Terengganu	2–0	Selangor	Kuala Terengganu
21:00 UTC+8	Mamut 40+2' (pen.); Syahmi 90+4'	Report		Stadium: Sultan Mizan Zainal Abidin Stadium; Attendance: 13,118; Referee: Fitri Maskon

24 September 2023 Second leg	Selangor	1–1 (1–3 agg.)	Terengganu	Petaling Jaya
21:00 UTC+8	Safuwan 69'	Report	Mamut 23' (pen.)	Stadium: Petaling Jaya Stadium; Attendance: 10,743; Referee: Mohd Hasrol Mohd Amir

==== Semi-finals ====
21 October 2023 First leg	Kuala Lumpur City	1–2	Terengganu	Cheras
21:00 UTC+8	Tchétché 90+5'	Report	Mamut 45+1'; Nik Sharif 89'	Stadium: Kuala Lumpur Stadium; Attendance: 4,210; Referee: Muhammad Usaid Jamal

3 November 2023 Second leg	Terengganu	2–1 (4–2 agg.)	Kuala Lumpur City	Kuala Terengganu
21:00 UTC+8	Mamut 42', 68'	Report	Morales 52'	Stadium: Sultan Mizan Zainal Abidin Stadium; Attendance: 25,221; Referee: Nazmi Nasaruddin

==== Final ====
8 December 2023 Final	Johor Darul Ta'zim	3–1	Terengganu	Kuala Lumpur
21:00 UTC+8	Bérgson 6' (pen.); Feroz 73'; Arif 90+5' (pen.)	Report	Mamut 21' (pen.)	Stadium: Bukit Jalil National Stadium; Attendance: 80,550; Referee: S. Logeswaran

=== Piala Sumbangsih ===
24 February 2023 Final	Johor Darul Ta'zim	2–0	Terengganu	Iskandar Puteri
21:00 UTC+8	Muñiz 5'; Bérgson 57'; Arribas (yellow card) 68'	Report	Mamut (yellow card) 62'	Stadium: Sultan Ibrahim Stadium; Attendance: 31,889; Referee: Suhaizi Shukri

=== AFC Cup ===
==== Group stage ====
The draw for the group stage was held on 24 August 2023.

Pos	Team	Pld	W	D	L	GF	GA	GD	Pts	Qualification
1	(Australia) Central Coast Mariners	6	4	1	1	21	7	+14	13	Zonal semi-finals
2	(Malaysia) Terengganu	6	3	3	0	10	6	+4	12	
3	(Indonesia) Bali United	6	2	1	3	15	15	0	7	
4	(Philippines) Stallion Laguna	6	0	1	5	9	27	−18	1	

Source: AFC
Rules for classification: Group stage tiebreakers
20 September 2023
20:00 UTC+8

Terengganu (Malaysia)	1–0	(Australia) Central Coast Mariners
Paull 45+1' (o.g.)	Report

Sultan Mizan Zainal Abidin Stadium, Kuala Terengganu
Attendance: 5,996
Referee: Al Majarafi Mahmood Salim Said (Oman)
4 October 2023
20:00 UTC+8

Bali United (Indonesia)	1–1	(Malaysia) Terengganu
Mbarga 54'	Report	Syahmi 84'

Kapten I Wayan Dipta Stadium, Gianyar
Attendance: 2,180
Referee: Bijan Heydari (Iran)
26 October 2023
16:00 UTC+8

Terengganu (Malaysia)	2–2	(Philippines) Stallion Laguna
Nordé 45+2'; Adisak 90+1'	Report	McDaniel 6'; Ngong Sam 41'

Sultan Mizan Zainal Abidin Stadium, Kuala Terengganu
Attendance: 1,220
Referee: Ali Reda (Lebanon)
8 November 2023
18:00 UTC+8

Stallion Laguna (Philippines)	2–3	(Malaysia) Terengganu
Ngong Sam 3'; McDaniel 14'	Report	Nierras 33' (o.g.); Mamut 67'; Nordé 86'

Biñan Football Stadium, Biñan
Attendance: 200
Referee: Ahmad Yacoub Ibrahim (Jordan)
29 November 2023
19:00 UTC+11

Central Coast Mariners (Australia)	1–1	(Malaysia) Terengganu
Di Pizio 87'	Report	Shakir 53'

Central Coast Stadium, Gosford
Attendance: 1,386
Referee: Ammar Mahfoodh (Bahrain)
13 December 2023
20:00 UTC+8

Terengganu (Malaysia)	2–0	(Indonesia) Bali United
Nordé 39'; Kulmatov 89'	Report

Sultan Mizan Zainal Abidin Stadium, Kuala Terengganu
Attendance: 1,450
Referee: Qasim Al-Hatmi (Oman)

== Player statistics ==
=== Appearances and goals ===
As of 13 December 2023

No.	Pos	Player	League		FA Cup		Malaysia Cup		AFC Cup		Total	
No.	Pos	Player	Apps	Goals	Apps	Goals	Apps	Goals	Apps	Goals	Apps	Goals
1	GK	(Malaysia) Rahadiazli Rahalim	7	0	1	0	1	0	0	0	9	0
2	DF	(Malaysia) Arif Fadzilah	5+7	0	1+2	0	2	0	4+1	0	22	0
3	DF	(Uzbekistan) Sardor Kulmatov	12+2	1	1	0	1+2	0	3	1	21	2
4	DF	(Malaysia) Adib Zainudin	0	0	0	0	0+1	0	0	0	1	0
5	DF	(Malaysia) Shahrul Nizam	23	1	3	0	6	0	4	0	36	1
6	DF	(Malaysia) Azam Azmi	21	0	3	1	6	0	3	0	33	1
7	FW	(Croatia) Ivan Mamut	13+7	11	2	3	7	9	5	1	34	24
8	MF	(Malaysia) Liridon Krasniqi	1+4	0	0	0	1+3	1	0+3	0	12	1
9	FW	(Thailand) Adisak Kraisorn	17+2	3	1	0	0+3	0	1+4	1	28	4
10	MF	(Bahrain) Habib Haroon	19	0	3	0	6	0	6	0	34	0
11	FW	(Haiti) Sony Nordé	19+1	5	2	1	6	0	6	3	34	9
13	MF	(Malaysia) Zuasyraf Zulkiefle	1+12	0	0	0	0	0	0+3	0	16	0
15	MF	(Malaysia) Faiz Nasir	1+7	0	0+1	0	0	0	0	0	9	0
16	MF	(Malaysia) Hakimi Abdullah	3+6	3	0+3	1	1+1	0	0	0	14	4
17	DF	(Malaysia) Syafiq Danial	0+1	0	0	0	0	0	0	0	1	0
18	MF	(Malaysia) Syaiful Haqim	1+6	0	0	0	1+2	0	0+2	0	12	0
19	FW	(Malaysia) Syafik Ismail	4+8	0	1+1	1	0	0	0	0	14	1
20	DF	(Malaysia) Hairiey Hakim	1+4	0	0	0	0	0	0	0	5	0
22	FW	(Malaysia) Engku Nur Shakir	10+8	5	2+1	0	6	1	4+1	1	32	7
24	DF	(Malaysia) Safwan Mazlan	9+9	1	0+2	0	5+1	0	3	0	29	1
25	DF	(Malaysia) Alif Zakaria	21+2	0	2	0	4	0	2+1	0	32	0
27	DF	(Malaysia) Azarul Nazarith	0+1	0	0	0	0	0	0	0	1	0
28	FW	(Ghana) Jordan Mintah	8+2	5	1+2	2	0	0	0	0	13	7
29	GK	(Malaysia) Syed Nasrulhaq	1	0	0	0	0+1	0	1	0	3	0
30	FW	(Malaysia) Muslihuddin 'Atiq	1+2	0	0	0	0	0	0	0	3	0
32	DF	(Malaysia) Ubaidullah Shamsul	3+3	0	0	0	4+2	0	3+1	0	16	0
36	DF	(Montenegro) Argzim Redžović	8+2	0	2	0	0+2	0	1+1	0	16	0
38	GK	(Malaysia) Suhaimi Husin	18	0	2	0	6	0	5	0	31	0
46	FW	(Malaysia) Syahmi Zamri	4+5	1	0	0	0+6	1	2+4	1	21	3
51	DF	(Malaysia) Faris Rifqi	2	0	0	0	0	0	0	0	2	0
66	MF	(Malaysia) Azfar Fikri	0+1	0	0	0	0+1	0	0	0	2	0
69	MF	(Malaysia) Hakim Hassan	7+1	2	0	0	7	2	4+2	0	21	4
80	MF	(Malaysia) Liridon Krasniqi	12+4	1	2	0	0	0	0	0	18	1
88	MF	(Malaysia) Nik Sharif Haseefy	9+5	2	2+1	0	0+6	1	3+1	0	27	3
91	MF	(Philippines) Omid Nazari	7+3	3	1+1	0	1+1	0	0+2	0	16	3
97	MF	(Uzbekistan) Nurillo Tukhtasinov	9+1	1	0	0	6	0	6	0	22	1
Players who left the club during the 2023 season
8	MF	(Croatia) Domagoj Pušić	9+4	0	0+1	0	0	0	0	0	14	0

== Transfers ==
=== Players in ===
Player	From	Fee
(Thailand) Adisak Kraisorn	(Thailand) Muangthong United	Free
(Croatia) Ivan Mamut	(Romania) FCSB	Free
(Croatia) Domagoj Pušić	(Croatia) BSK Bijelo Brdo	Free
(Uzbekistan) Sardor Kulmatov	(Uzbekistan) Sogdiana Jizzakh	Free
(Haiti) Sony Nordé	(Malaysia) Melaka United	Free
(Malaysia) Nik Sharif Haseefy	(Malaysia) Selangor	Free
(Malaysia) Hakim Hassan	(Malaysia) Selangor	Free
(Uzbekistan) Nurillo Tukhtasinov	(Uzbekistan) Neftchi Fergana	Free

=== Players out ===
Player	To	Fee
(Philippines) Manuel Ott	(Malaysia) Kedah Darul Aman	Free
(Malaysia) Shamirza Yusoff	Free Agent	Free
(Malaysia) Sharin Sapien	Free Agent	Free
(Malaysia) Azalinullah Alias	Free Agent	Free
(Malaysia) Nik Akif	(Malaysia) Penang	Free
(Malaysia) Arif Anwar	(Malaysia) PDRM	Free
(Malaysia) Hafizal Mohamad	(Malaysia) Perak	Free
(Malaysia) Faisal Halim	(Malaysia) Selangor	Free
(Senegal) Papé Diakité	(Vietnam) Hoang Anh Gia Lai	Free
(Namibia) Petrus Shitembi	Free Agent	Free
(Ivory Coast) Kipré Tchétché	(Malaysia) Kuala Lumpur City	Free
(Liberia) Kpah Sherman	(Malaysia) Sri Pahang	Free
(Philippines) Luke Woodland	Free Agent	Free

=== Loans in ===
Player	From	Fee
(Malaysia) Liridon Krasniqi	(Malaysia) Johor Darul Ta'zim	Loan

=== Loans out ===
Player	To	Fee
(Malaysia) Rahmat Makasuf	(Malaysia) Penang	Loan
(Malaysia) Faiz Nasir	(Malaysia) Kelantan United	Loan
(Malaysia) Azarul Nazarith	(Malaysia) Kelantan United	loan
