= 2021 Terengganu F.C. season =

Malaysia Super League football team

Terengganu
2021 season
- President: Dr. Samsuri Mokhtar
- CEO: Ab Rasid Jusoh
- Head coach: Nafuzi Zain
- Stadium: Sultan Mizan Zainal Abidin Stadium
- Malaysia Super League: 4th
- Malaysia Cup: Semi-finals
- AFC Cup: Cancelled
- Top goalscorer: League: David da Silva (7 goals); All: Faisal Halim (10 goals)
- Highest home attendance: 0
- Lowest home attendance: 0
- Average home league attendance: 0
Home colours	Away colours

The 2021 season was Terengganu's fourth season in the Malaysia Super League since the rebranding in 2017.

== Players ==
As of 24 July 2021

Note: Flags indicate national team as defined under FIFA eligibility rules; some limited exceptions apply. Players may hold more than one non-FIFA nationality.

No.	Pos.	Nation	Player
1	GK	MAS	Syed Nasrulhaq
2	DF	MAS	Arif Fadzilah
3	DF	MAS	Muhammad Faudzi
4	MF	MAS	Nasir Basharudin
5	DF	MAS	Shahrul Nizam
6	DF	PHI	Carli de Murga (captain)
7	FW	MAS	Faisal Halim
10	FW	MLI	Makan Konaté
11	MF	MAS	Arif Anwar
13	DF	MAS	Hafizal Mohamad
14	FW	BRA	David da Silva
15	MF	MAS	Faiz Nasir
16	MF	MAS	Hakimi Abdullah
17	FW	MAS	Isa Raman
18	MF	MAS	Azalinullah Alias
20	MF	MAS	Sharin Sapien

No.	Pos.	Nation	Player
22	FW	MAS	Nik Akif
23	DF	MAS	Azam Azmi
24	DF	MNE	Argzim Redžović
25	DF	MAS	Alif Zakaria
26	GK	MAS	Rahadiazli Rahalim
27	DF	MAS	Azarul Nazarith
28	FW	MAS	Rahmat Makasuf
29	FW	MAS	Engku Nur Shakir
30	MF	CIV	Dechi Marcel
33	GK	MAS	Shamirza Yusoff
38	GK	MAS	Suhaimi Husin
55	DF	MAS	Hairiey Hakim
71	DF	MAS	Amirul Hafizul
77	MF	ENG	Lee Tuck (on loan from Sri Pahang)
82	FW	GHA	Jordan Mintah
88	MF	BHR	Habib Haroon (vice-captain)

== Coaching staff ==
Position	Staff
Team manager	(Malaysia) Zul Fadli Rozi
Head coach	(Malaysia) Nafuzi Zain
Assistant head coach	(Malaysia) Tengku Hazman Raja Hassan
Goalkeeping coach	(Malaysia) Yazid Yassin
Fitness coach	(Malaysia) Efindy Salleh
Team doctor	(Malaysia) Leong Tiong Lee
Physiotherapist	(Malaysia) Zulkifli Mohd Zin

== Transfers ==
=== Transfers in ===
Pre-season

No.	Position	Player	Transferred from	Ref
7	FW	(Malaysia) Faisal Halim	(Malaysia) Pahang	2 years contract
11	FW	(Malaysia) Arif Anwar	(Malaysia) UiTM	
5	DF	(Malaysia) Shahrul Nizam	(Malaysia) Kelantan	2 years contract
22	FW	(Malaysia) Nik Akif	(Malaysia) Kelantan	
6	DF	(Philippines) Carli de Murga	(Thailand) Chonburi	
32	DF	(Australia) Chris Herd	(Bangladesh) Sheikh Russel KC	1 year contract
10	MF	(Mali) Makan Konaté	(Indonesia) Persebaya Surabaya	
14	FW	(Brazil) David da Silva	(Indonesia) Persebaya Surabaya	1 year contract
19	FW	(Namibia) Petrus Shitembi	(Malaysia) Sabah	1 year contract
8	DF	(Malaysia) Asnan Ahmad	(Malaysia) UKM	
16	MF	(Malaysia) Hakimi Abdullah	(Malaysia) Kelantan	2 years contract
24	DF	(Malaysia) Azarul Nazarith	(Malaysia) FELDA United	Free transfer

Mid-season

No.	Position	Player	Transferred from	Ref
77	MF	(England) Lee Tuck	(Malaysia) Pahang	Season loan
88	MF	(Bahrain) Habib Haroon	(Bahrain) Riffa	

=== From youth squad ===
N	Pos.	Nat.	Name	Age	Notes
1	GK	(Malaysia)	Syed Nasrulhaq	22	
17	FW	(Malaysia)	Isa Raman	21	
25	DF	(Malaysia)	Alif Zakaria	23	
29	MF	(Malaysia)	Engku Nur Shakir	22	

=== Transfers out ===
Pre-season

No.	Position	Player	Transferred to	Ref
25	GK	(Malaysia) Ilham Amirullah	(Malaysia) Kedah	Free transfer
5	DF	(Senegal) Babacar Diallo	Unattached	
4	DF	(Malaysia) Kamal Azizi	(Malaysia) Kuala Lumpur City	Free transfer
17	DF	(Malaysia) Nasrullah Haniff	(Malaysia) Negeri Sembilan	Free transfer
24	MF	(Malaysia) D. Saarvindran	(Malaysia) Penang	Free transfer
19	MF	(Malaysia) Stuart Wark	(Malaysia) Sarawak United	Free transfer
7	MF	(England) Lee Tuck	(Malaysia) Pahang	Free transfer
22	MF	(Uzbekistan) Sanjar Shaakhmedov	(Uzbekistan) FC AGMK	Free transfer
10	FW	(Singapore) Faris Ramli	(Singapore) Lion City Sailors	Free transfer
14	FW	(Malaysia) Darren Lok	(Malaysia) Petaling Jaya City	Free transfer
11	FW	(Mauritania) Dominique Da Sylva	(Malaysia) Kuala Lumpur	Free transfer
9	FW	(Japan) Bruno Suzuki	(Malaysia) PDRM	Free transfer

Mid-season

No.	Position	Player	Transferred to	Ref
8	MF	(Malaysia) Asnan Ahmad	(Malaysia) Kedah Darul Aman	Undisclosed
19	FW	(Namibia) Petrus Shitembi	Unattached	
32	DF	(Australia) Chris Herd	Unattached	

=== Retained ===
No.	Position	Player	Ref
1	GK	(Malaysia) Rahadiazli Rahalim	
2	DF	(Malaysia) Arif Fadzilah	

== Friendlies ==
JDT Invitation Cup (19-25 February 2021)

19 February 2021 Invitation Cup	Melaka United (Malaysia)	1–1	(Malaysia) Terengganu	Iskandar Puteri
				Stadium: Sultan Ibrahim Stadium

23 February 2021 Invatitation Cup	Johor Darul Ta'zim (Malaysia)	1–0	(Malaysia) Terengganu	Iskandar Puteri
				Stadium: Sultan Ibrahim Stadium

Others

28 February 2021 Friendly	Terengganu (Malaysia)	3–1	(Malaysia) Kelantan United	Kuala Terengganu
	Konaté 18'; Azalinullah 30'; Carli de Murga 52' (pen.)		Asraff 55'	Stadium: Sultan Ismail Nasiruddin Shah Stadium

11 July 2021 Friendly	Terengganu (Malaysia)	0–2	(Malaysia) Penang	Kuala Terengganu
	Azim; Jafri			Stadium: Sultan Ismail Nasiruddin Shah Stadium

16 July 2021 Friendly	Terengganu (Malaysia)	3–0	(Malaysia) Royal Police	Kuala Terengganu
	Habib 23'; Faisal 40'; Mintah 45'			Stadium: Sultan Ismail Nasiruddin Shah Stadium

18 July 2021 Friendly	Terengganu (Malaysia)	4–0	(Malaysia) Kelantan United	Kuala Terengganu
	Marcel 15'; Faisal 26'; Rahmat 76'; Hakimi 87'			Stadium: Sultan Ismail Nasiruddin Shah Stadium

=== Terengganu II ===
Shah Alam City Cup (19–23 February 2021)

19 February 2021 Friendly	Terengganu II (Malaysia)	1–1	(Malaysia) UiTM	Shah Alam
	Mintah 90'		Poku 3'	Stadium: UiTM Stadium

21 February 2021 Friendly	Terengganu II (Malaysia)	2–2	(Malaysia) Sri Pahang	Shah Alam
	Mintah 59', 86' (pen.)		Hafiz 28'; Pedro 70'	Stadium: UiTM Stadium

Others

26 February 2021 Friendly	Terengganu II (Malaysia)	1–1	(Malaysia) Kelantan	Kuala Terengganu
	Mintah pen.'		Hindle	Stadium: Sultan Ismail Nasiruddin Shah Stadium

12 July 2021 Friendly	Terengganu II (Malaysia)	2–1	(Malaysia) Penang	Kuala Terengganu
	Ridzuan 32'; Hairiey 49'		Azwan 80'	Stadium: Sultan Ismail Nasiruddin Shah Stadium

== Competitions ==
=== Malaysia Super League ===
==== League table ====
Pos	Team	Pld	W	D	L	GF	GA	GD	Pts	Qualification or relegation
2	Kedah Darul Aman	22	13	4	5	44	28	+16	43	Qualification for AFC Cup group stage
3	Penang	22	12	5	5	37	30	+7	41	
4	Terengganu	22	11	5	6	33	20	+13	38	
5	Selangor	22	10	6	6	45	30	+15	36	
6	Kuala Lumpur City	22	8	9	5	27	20	+7	33 (Note: KL City qualified to 2022 AFC Cup as winner of 2021 Malaysia Cup)	Qualification for AFC Cup group stage

Source: Malaysian Football League
Rules for classification: 1) Points; 2) Goal difference; 3) Number of goals scored.

==== Matches ====
6 March 2021 1	UiTM	1–2	Terengganu	Shah Alam
21:00 UTC+8	Rafie 32', (yellow card) 59'		da Silva 77'; Hakimi 88'	Stadium: UiTM Stadium; Attendance: 0 Referee: Fitri Maskon

9 March 2021 2	Terengganu	3–1	Selangor	Kuala Nerus
21:00 UTC+8	Mintah 34'; Rahmat 59'; Hakimi 94'		Nizam 73' (o.g.)	Stadium: Sultan Mizan Zainal Abidin Stadium; Attendance: 0 Referee: Mohd Amirul Izwan Yaacob

14 March 2021 3	Perak	0–2	Terengganu	Ipoh
21:00 UTC+8	Amirul (yellow card) 50'; Rafiuddin (yellow card) 61'; Leandro (yellow card) 68'		Faisal 25'; Marcel 90'	Stadium: Perak Stadium; Attendance: 0 Referee: Suhaizi Shukri

17 March 2021 4	Terengganu	1–1	Melaka United	Kuala Nerus
21:00 UTC+8	Mintah 66'		Alex 9' (pen.)	Stadium: Sultan Mizan Zainal Abidin Stadium; Attendance: 0 Referee: Noor Azriel Baharudin

21 March 2021 5	Sabah	2–1	Terengganu	Kota Kinabalu
21:00 UTC+8	Madinda 37'; Johnson 41'		Mintah 78'	Stadium: Likas Stadium; Attendance: 0 Referee: Khirulazuan Kidam

2 April 2021 6	Terengganu	0–0	Petaling Jaya City	Kuala Nerus
21:00 UTC+8				Stadium: Sultan Mizan Zainal Abidin Stadium; Referee: Zamzaidi Katimin

6 April 2021 7	Sri Pahang	1–1	Terengganu	Kuantan
21:00 UTC+8	Azam 17'; Muslim (yellow card) 71'		Mintah 74' (pen.); Suhaimi (yellow card) 58'	Stadium: Darul Makmur Stadium; Attendance: 967; Referee: Hasrol Amir

9 April 2021 8	Kedah Darul Aman	1–2	Terengganu	Alor Setar
21:00 UTC+8	Muhammad 39' (o.g); Ariff (yellow card) 45+1'; Fadzrul (red card) 90+4'; Rodney (red card) 90+5'		da Silva 45+2' (pen.); Azam 60'; Muhammad (yellow card) 35'; Arif (yellow card) 64'; Faisal (yellow card) 90'	Stadium: Darul Aman Stadium; Attendance: 6,000; Referee: Noor Azriel Baharudin

16 April 2021 9	Terengganu	1–0	Kuala Lumpur City	Kuala Nerus
21:00 UTC+8	Konaté 88'			Stadium: Sultan Mizan Zainal Abidin Stadium; Attendance: 2,918; Referee: Zamzaidi Katimin

24 April 2021 10	Johor Darul Ta'zim	0–1	Terengganu	Iskandar Puteri
21:00 UTC+8	Afiq (yellow card) 17'; Insa (yellow card) 62'		Hakimi 57'; Marcel (yellow card) 9'; Rahmat (yellow card) 86'; Arif (yellow card) 90'	Stadium: Sultan Ibrahim Stadium; Attendance: 2,000; Referee: Zulkarnian Zakaria

1 May 2021 11	Terengganu	1–4	Penang	Kuala Nerus
22:00 UTC+8	Hakimi 59'		Boboev 7'; Endrick 21'; Casagrande 66', 68'	Stadium: Sultan Mizan Zainal Abidin Stadium; Attendance: 5,561; Referee: Suhaizi Shukri

4 May 2021 12	Terengganu	3–0	UiTM	Kuala Nerus
22:00 UTC+8	da Silva 8'; Faisal 10'; Rahmat 77'			Stadium: Sultan Mizan Zainal Abidin Stadium; Attendance: 1,201; Referee: Ku Alauddin Ku Muhammad

9 May 2021 13	Selangor	1–2	Terengganu	Kelana Jaya
22:00 UTC+8	Olusegun 49'		Shakir 72'; Carli de Murga 87'	Stadium: MBPJ Stadium; Attendance: 0 Referee: Fitri Maskon

24 July 2021 14	Terengganu	5–0	Perak	Kuala Nerus
21:00 UTC+8	Faisal 19'; da Silva 23' (pen.); Machell 42' (o.g.); Hakimi 71'; Nik Akif 90+5' (pen.)			Stadium: Sultan Mizan Zainal Abidin Stadium; Attendance: 0 Referee: Zuhaidi Dzulkifli

28 July 2021 15	Melaka United	2–0	Terengganu	Krubong
21:00 UTC+8	Norde 36', (yellow card) 51'; Adriano 77'; Kumaahran (yellow card) 81'	Report	Carli de Murga (yellow card) 19'; Azam (yellow card) 41'; Arif (yellow card) 68'	Stadium: Hang Jebat Stadium; Attendance: 0 Referee: Mohd Nafeez Abd Wahab

1 August 2021 16	Terengganu	0–0	Sabah	Kuala Nerus
21:00 UTC+8	Arif (yellow card) 31'; Nizam (yellow card) 54'		Nureizkhan (yellow card) 45+3'	Stadium: Sultan Mizan Zainal Abidin Stadium; Attendance: 0 Referee: Suhaizi Shukri

4 August 2021 17	Petaling Jaya City	0–3	Terengganu	Kelana Jaya
21:00 UTC+8		Report	Marcel 13'; Hakimi (yellow card) 41'; da Silva 87'; Rahmat 90+2'	Stadium: MBPJ Stadium; Attendance: 0 Referee: Muhammad Nazmi Nasaruddin

7 August 2021 18	Terengganu	2–0	Sri Pahang	Kuala Nerus
21:00 UTC+8	da Silva 12'; Faisal 24'	Report	Goulon (yellow card) 48'	Stadium: Sultan Mizan Zainal Abidin Stadium; Attendance: 0 Referee: Mohd Amirul Izwan Yaacob

21 August 2021 19	Terengganu	1–2	Kedah Darul Aman	Kuala Nerus
21:00 UTC+8	Arif (yellow card) 45'; da Silva 70'; Rahmat (yellow card) 90+4'	Report	Syazwan (yellow card) 42', (goal) 51'; Ataya 45+3'	Stadium: Sultan Mizan Zainal Abidin Stadium; Attendance: 0 Referee: Mohd Hasrol Mohd Amir

29 August 2021 20	Kuala Lumpur City	1–0	Terengganu	Cheras
21:00 UTC+8	Paulo Josué 29'	Report		Stadium: Kuala Lumpur Stadium; Attendance: 0 Referee: Muhammad Nazmi Nasaruddin

4 September 2021 21	Terengganu	0–1	Johor Darul Ta'zim	Kuala Nerus
21:00 UTC+8	Rahmat (yellow card) 87'	Report	Lowry 45+2'; Arif (yellow card) 83'	Stadium: Sultan Mizan Zainal Abidin Stadium; Attendance: 0 Referee: Mohd Hasrol Mohd Amir

12 September 2021 22	Penang	2–2	Terengganu	Penang
21:00 UTC+8	Latiff (red card) 13'; Boboev 40'; Casagrande 40+1', (yellow card) 81'; Khairu (yellow card) 85'; Rafael Vitor (yellow card) 90+5'	Report	Redžović 25'; Tuck 80'	Stadium: City Stadium; Attendance: 0 Referee: Mohd Amirul Izwan Yaacob

=== Malaysia Cup ===
==== Group stage ====
The draw for the group stage was held on 15 September 2021.

Pos	Team	Pld	W	D	L	GF	GA	GD	Pts	Qualification	TER	SEL	KUC	PRK
1	Terengganu	6	5	1	0	16	4	+12	16	Quarter-finals	—	2–1	2–0	4–0
2	Selangor	6	4	0	2	12	8	+4	12	Quarter-finals	1–3	—	5–1	1–0
3	Kuching City	6	1	2	3	6	12	−6	5		1–1	1–2	—	2–2
4	Perak	6	0	1	5	4	14	−10	1		1–4	1–2	0–1	—

Source: MFL, FAM

26 September 2021 1	Terengganu	2–0	Kuching City	Kuala Nerus
21:00 UTC +8	Tuck 23' (pen.); Faisal 48'	Report		Stadium: Sultan Mizan Zainal Abidin Stadium; Attendance: 0 Referee: Ahmad Zuhaidi Dzulkifli

29 September 2021 2	Terengganu	2–1	Selangor	Kuala Nerus
21:00 UTC +8	Marcel 23'; Tuck 52'; Faisal (yellow card) 56'; Hakimi (yellow card) 68'; Shahrul (yellow card) 70'; Suhaimi (yellow card) 90+3'	Report	Safuwan (yellow card) 39'; Dinesh (yellow card) 69'; Ashmawi 75'	Stadium: Sultan Mizan Zainal Abidin Stadium; Attendance: 0 Referee: Muhammad Nazmi Nasaruddin

30 October 2021 3	Perak	1–4	Terengganu	Ipoh
21:00 UTC +8	Danish (yellow card) 19'; Agüero 24' (pen.)	Report	Faisal 9'; Danish 47' (o.g.); Tuck 54', 83'; de Murga (yellow card) 65'	Stadium: Perak Stadium; Attendance: 1,248; Referee: Mohd Fusser Mad Sallih

3 November 2021 4	Terengganu	4–0	Perak	Kuala Nerus
21:00 UTC +8	Konaté 13'; da Silva 20'; Dechi 26'; Faisal 63' (pen.)	Report		Stadium: Sultan Mizan Zainal Abidin Stadium; Attendance: 4,200; Referee: Mohd Hasrol Mohd Amir

7 November 2021 5	Selangor	1–3	Terengganu	Petaling Jaya
21:00 UTC +8	Shahrel 83'	Report	Faisal 15'; Mintah 72', 90'	Stadium: MBPJ Stadium; Attendance: 2,496; Referee: Mohd Nafeez Abd Wahab

10 November 2021 6	Kuching City	1–1	Terengganu	Kuching
21:00 UTC +8	Suzuki 46'	Report	Rahmat 19'	Stadium: Sarawak Stadium; Attendance: 0 Referee: Muhammad Usaid Jamal

==== Knockout stage ====
===== Quarter-finals =====
14 November 2021 First leg	Terengganu	2–1	Sarawak United	Kuala Nerus
21:00 UTC +8	Faisal 17'; Faiz 51'	Report	Shahrul Nizam 22' (o.g.)	Stadium: Sultan Mizan Zainal Abidin Stadium; Attendance: 8,717; Referee: Mohd Hasrol Mohd Amir

18 November 2021 Second leg	Sarawak United	2–4 (6–3 agg.)	Terengganu	Shah Alam
21:00 UTC +8	Sandro 71'; Agba 89'	Report	Mintah 2', 64'; Faisal 12'; Faiz 45'	Stadium: UiTM Stadium; Attendance: 2,093; Referee: Mohd Fusser Mad Sallih

===== Semi-finals =====
22 November 2021 First leg	Terengganu	1–1	Johor Darul Ta'zim	Kuala Nerus
21:00 UTC +8	Mintah 8'	Report	Bergson 50'	Stadium: Sultan Mizan Zainal Abidin Stadium; Attendance: 20,000; Referee: Tuan Mohd Yaasin Tuan Mohd Hanafiah

26 November 2021 Second leg	Johor Darul Ta'zim	3–0 (4–1 agg.)	Terengganu	Iskandar Puteri
21:00 UTC +8	Bergson 7', 14'; Cabrera 11'	Report		Stadium: Sultan Ibrahim Stadium; Attendance: 17,430; Referee: Muhammad Nazmi Nasaruddin

=== AFC Cup ===
On 11 November 2020, the AFC approved a new calendar for the competition due to the COVID-19 pandemic, where the group stage is played as centralized single round-robin tournament, and the preliminary round, play-off round, and ASEAN Zone semi-finals and final are played as a single match.

Teams from ASEAN Zone will not compete in the knockout stage, due to the cancellation of group stage matches in ASEAN Zone.

== Statistics ==
=== Appearances and goals ===
Players with no appearances not included in the list.

As of 26 November 2021

No.	Pos	Nat	Player	Total		League		Malaysia Cup	
No.	Pos	Nat	Player	Apps	Goals	Apps	Goals	Apps	Goals
2	DF	(Malaysia) MAS	Arif Fadzilah	25	0	16+3	0	6	0
3	DF	(Malaysia) MAS	Muhammad Faudzi	14	0	10+3	0	0+1	0
4	MF	(Malaysia) MAS	Nasir Basharudin	18	0	6+6	0	1+5	0
5	DF	(Malaysia) MAS	Shahrul Nizam	29	0	13+7	0	9	0
6	DF	(Philippines) PHI	Carli de Murga	22	1	17	1	5	0
7	FW	(Malaysia) MAS	Faisal Halim	31	10	22	4	9	6
10	MF	(Mali) MLI	Makan Konaté	23	2	20	1	3	1
11	FW	(Malaysia) MAS	Arif Anwar	7	0	1+6	0	0	0
13	DF	(Malaysia) MAS	Hafizal Mohamad	10	0	3+4	0	1+2	0
14	FW	(Brazil) BRA	David da Silva	17	8	15	7	1+1	1
15	MF	(Malaysia) MAS	Faiz Nasir	26	2	13+4	0	8+1	2
16	MF	(Malaysia) MAS	Hakimi Abdullah	26	5	9+12	5	0+5	0
17	FW	(Malaysia) MAS	Isa Raman	1	0	0	0	1	0
18	DF	(Malaysia) MAS	Azalinullah Alias	3	0	2+1	0	0	0
20	MF	(Malaysia) MAS	Sharin Sapien	11	0	3+4	0	2+2	0
22	MF	(Malaysia) MAS	Nik Akif	20	1	5+12	1	1+2	0
23	MF	(Malaysia) MAS	Azam Azmi	22	1	14+5	1	2+1	0
24	DF	(Montenegro) MNE	Argzim Redžović	9	1	4	1	5	0
25	DF	(Malaysia) MAS	Alif Zakaria	6	0	0+1	0	1+4	0
26	GK	(Malaysia) MAS	Rahadiazli Rahalim	5	0	5	0	0	0
27	DF	(Malaysia) MAS	Azarul Nazarith	19	0	8+2	0	9	0
28	FW	(Malaysia) MAS	Rahmat Makasuf	19	4	0+15	3	2+2	1
29	FW	(Malaysia) MAS	Engku Nur Shakir	12	1	0+5	1	2+5	0
30	MF	(Ivory Coast) CIV	Dechi Marcel	26	4	18	2	8	2
33	GK	(Malaysia) MAS	Shamirza Yusoff	2	0	0	0	2	0
38	GK	(Malaysia) MAS	Suhaimi Husin	25	0	17	0	8	0
40	MF	(Malaysia) MAS	Zuasyraf Zulkiefle	4	0	0	0	2+2	0
43	MF	(Malaysia) MAS	Amirul Syazwan	2	0	0	0	0+2	0
44	DF	(Malaysia) MAS	Aqil Irfanuddin	2	0	0	0	0+2	0
48	MF	(Malaysia) MAS	Azfar Fikri	1	0	0	0	0+1	0
55	DF	(Malaysia) MAS	Hairiey Hakim	5	0	3	0	1+1	0
66	MF	(Malaysia) MAS	Syafik Ismail	1	0	0	0	0+1	0
77	MF	(Malaysia) MAS	Lee Tuck	8	5	3	1	4+1	4
82	FW	(Ghana) GHA	Jordan Mintah	14	9	6	4	8	5
88	MF	(Bahrain) BHR	Habib Haroon	17	0	9	0	8	0
Players transferred out during the season
8	DF	(Malaysia) MAS	Asnan Ahmad	1	0	0+1	0	0	0
19	MF	(Namibia) NAM	Petrus Shitembi	0	0	0	0	0	0
32	DF	(Australia) AUS	Chris Herd	1	0	0+1	0	0	0

== Terengganu FC II ==
=== Appearances and goals ===
Players with no appearances not included in the list.

As of 21 September 2021

No.	Pos	Nat	Player	Total		League		Malaysia Cup	
No.	Pos	Nat	Player	Apps	Goals	Apps	Goals	Apps	Goals
3	DF	(Malaysia) MAS	Samsul Ikram	1	0	1	0	0	0
4	MF	(Ivory Coast) CIV	Dechi Marcel	5	0	5	0	0	0
5	DF	(Japan) JPN	Masaki Watanabe	17	2	16+1	2	0	0
6	MF	(Malaysia) MAS	Azfar Fikri	16	2	8+8	2	0	0
7	MF	(Malaysia) MAS	Haidhir Suhaini	1	0	0+1	0	0	0
8	FW	(Malaysia) MAS	Muslihuddin 'Atiq	13	1	5+8	1	0	0
9	FW	(Malaysia) MAS	Fazli Ghazali	13	2	2+11	2	0	0
10	MF	(Malaysia) MAS	Syafik Ismail	18	1	17+1	1	0	0
11	MF	(Malaysia) MAS	Ridzuan Razali	11	1	2+9	1	0	0
13	MF	(Malaysia) MAS	Zuasyraf Zulkiefle	14	0	11+3	0	0	0
14	MF	(Malaysia) MAS	Izman Solehin	9	0	8+1	0	0	0
15	FW	(Malaysia) MAS	Firas Tarmizi	5	0	0+5	0	0	0
16	DF	(Malaysia) MAS	Che Mohd Arif	8	0	5+3	0	0	0
17	FW	(Malaysia) MAS	Ramzi Sufian	16	3	10+6	3	0	0
18	MF	(Malaysia) MAS	Syaiful Haqim	2	0	0+2	0	0	0
19	DF	(Malaysia) MAS	Firdaus Rusdi	3	0	0+3	0	0	0
20	MF	(Malaysia) MAS	Amirul Syazwan	18	2	15+3	2	0	0
21	MF	(Malaysia) MAS	Fakrul Wahid	5	0	0+5	0	0	0
22	DF	(Malaysia) MAS	Hairiey Hakim	16	0	16	0	0	0
23	DF	(Malaysia) MAS	Aqil Irfanuddin	19	0	19	0	0	0
24	GK	(Malaysia) MAS	Suhaimi Husin	5	0	5	0	0	0
25	GK	(Malaysia) MAS	Shafawi Mohamad	6	0	6	0	0	0
26	MF	(Montenegro) MNE	Argzim Redžović	16	2	16	2	0	0
28	FW	(Ghana) GHA	Jordan Mintah	12	16	12	16	0	0
28	DF	(Malaysia) MAS	Syafiq Danial	1	0	0+1	0	0	0
30	FW	(Malaysia) MAS	Izzan Syahmi	6	0	3+3	0	0	0
32	DF	(Malaysia) MAS	Alif Zakaria	14	0	13+1	0	0	0
33	FW	(Malaysia) MAS	Engku Nur Shakir	10	2	8+2	2	0	0
34	DF	(Malaysia) MAS	Azam Azmi	1	0	1	0	0	0
35	GK	(Malaysia) MAS	Syed Nasrulhaq	9	0	9	0	0	0
36	DF	(Malaysia) MAS	Muhammad Faudzi	2	0	2	0	0	0
37	FW	(Malaysia) MAS	Isa Raman	7	1	0+7	1	0	0
42	DF	(Malaysia) MAS	Arif Fadzilah	1	0	1	0	0	0
47	DF	(Malaysia) MAS	Azarul Nazarith	1	0	1	0	0	0
48	MF	(Malaysia) MAS	Rahmat Makasuf	2	0	2	0	0	0
55	MF	(Australia) AUS	Chris Herd	1	0	1	0	0	0

=== Clean sheets ===
As of match played 21 March 2021

Rank	No.	Pos.	Player	League	Malaysia Cup	Total
1	24	GK	(Malaysia) Suhaimi Husin	3	0	0
2		GK	(Malaysia)	0	0	0
Totals				0	0	0
