= 2022 Terengganu FC season =

Malaysia Super League football team

Terengganu
2022 season
- President: Dr. Samsuri Mokhtar
- CEO: Ab Rasid Jusoh
- Head coach: Nafuzi Zain
- Stadium: Sultan Mizan Zainal Abidin Stadium
- Malaysia Super League: 2nd
- Malaysia FA Cup: Runners-up
- Malaysia Cup: Semi-finals
- Top goalscorer: League: Kipré Tchétché (13); All: Kipré Tchétché (19)
| Home colours | Away colours |

The 2022 season was Terengganu's 64th season. It is the club's 16th consecutive season in the top flight of Malaysian football, having been promoted from the Malaysia Premier League at the end of the 2005–06 season. The club also participated in the Malaysia FA Cup and Malaysia Cup.

== Coaching staff ==
- Head coach: Nafuzi Zain
- Assistant head coach: Tengku Hazman
- Assistant coach: Hairuddin Omar
- Goalkeeping coach: Yazid Yassin
- Fitness coach: Efindy Salleh
- Physiotherapist: Zulkifli Mohd Zin

== Players ==
=== First-team squad ===
Note: Flags indicate national team as defined under FIFA eligibility rules; some limited exceptions apply. Players may hold more than one non-FIFA nationality.

| No. | Pos. | Nation | Player |
|---|---|---|---|
| 1 | GK | MAS | Rahadiazli Rahalim |
| 2 | DF | MAS | Arif Fadzilah |
| 4 | DF | MAS | Adib Zainudin |
| 5 | DF | MAS | Shahrul Nizam |
| 6 | DF | MAS | Azam Azmi |
| 7 | FW | MAS | Faisal Halim |
| 8 | MF | PHI | Manuel Ott |
| 9 | FW | LBR | Kpah Sherman |
| 10 | MF | BHR | Habib Haroon |
| 11 | FW | NAM | Petrus Shitembi |
| 13 | DF | MAS | Hafizal Mohamad |
| 14 | DF | PHI | Luke Woodland |
| 15 | MF | MAS | Faiz Nasir |
| 16 | MF | MAS | Hakimi Abdullah |
| 17 | FW | MAS | Arif Anwar |
| 18 | MF | MAS | Azalinullah Alias |
| 19 | MF | MAS | Syafik Ismail |

| No. | Pos. | Nation | Player |
|---|---|---|---|
| 20 | MF | MAS | Sharin Sapien |
| 21 | GK | MAS | Syed Muhammad Nasrulhaq |
| 22 | DF | MAS | Hairiey Hakim |
| 23 | FW | CIV | Kipré Tchétché (captain) |
| 24 | DF | MNE | Argzim Redžović |
| 25 | DF | MAS | Alif Zakaria |
| 26 | MF | MAS | Syaiful Haqim |
| 27 | DF | MAS | Azarul Nazarith |
| 28 | FW | MAS | Rahmat Makasuf |
| 29 | FW | MAS | Engku Nur Shakir |
| 30 | MF | MAS | Zuasyraf Zulkiefle |
| 32 | DF | MAS | Aqil Irfanuddin |
| 33 | GK | MAS | Shamirza Yusoff |
| 34 | DF | MAS | Safwan Mazlan |
| 38 | GK | MAS | Suhaimi Husin |
| 44 | DF | SEN | Papé Diakité |
| 88 | MF | MAS | Nik Sharif Haseefy (on loan from Selangor) |

=== Transfers in ===
Note: Flags indicate national team as defined under FIFA eligibility rules; some limited exceptions apply. Players may hold more than one non-FIFA nationality.

| No. | Pos. | Nation | Player |
|---|---|---|---|
| 8 | MF | PHI | Manuel Ott (from Melaka United) |
| 9 | FW | LBR | Kpah Sherman (from Kedah Darul Aman) |
| 88 | MF | MAS | Nik Sharif Haseefy (on loan from Selangor) |

=== Transfers out ===
Note: Flags indicate national team as defined under FIFA eligibility rules; some limited exceptions apply. Players may hold more than one non-FIFA nationality.

| No. | Pos. | Nation | Player |
|---|---|---|---|
| 3 | DF | MAS | Muhammad Faudzi (to Kuala Lumpur City) |
| 4 | MF | MAS | Nasir Basharudin (to Petaling Jaya City) |

== Competitions ==
=== Malaysia Super League ===
Win Draw Loss

| 6 April 2022 1 | Petaling Jaya City | 3–0 | Terengganu | Petaling Jaya |
| 22:00 MYT (UTC+08:00) | Darren Lok 13', 32', 39'; Aroon Kumar (yellow card) 67' | Report | | Stadium: MBPJ Stadium; Attendance: 510; Referee: Suhaizi Shukri; Man of the Match: Darren Lok |

| 10 April 2022 2 | Johor Darul Ta'zim | 2–1 | Terengganu | Iskandar Puteri |
| 22:00 MYT (UTC+08:00) | Bergson 7', 33'; Leandro Velázquez (yellow card) 58'; Corbin-Ong (yellow card) 89' | Report | Kpah Sherman 31' (yellow card) 35' | Stadium: Sultan Ibrahim Stadium; Attendance: 8,371; Referee: Mohd Fusser bin Mad Sallih; Man of the Match: Bergson |

| 17 April 2022 3 | Sarawak United | 0–2 | Terengganu | Kuching |
| 21:15 MYT (UTC+08:00) | Kalaiharasan (yellow card) 56' | Report | Kpah Sherman 8' (red card); Habib Haroon (yellow card) 50'; Rahadiazli Rahalim (yellow card) 69'; Zuasyraf Zulkiefle 90+2' | Stadium: Negeri Stadium; Attendance: 580; Referee: Ahmad Zuhadi Dzulkilfi; Man of the Match: Zuasyraf Zulkiefle |

| 24 April 2022 4 | Terengganu | 2–0 | Selangor |

| 18 June 2022 5 | Terengganu | 2–0 | Kuala Lumpur City |

| 22 June 2022 6 | Penang | 2–0 | Terengganu |

| 29 June 2022 7 | Terengganu | 0–0 | Negeri Sembilan |

| 3 July 2022 8 | Terengganu | 2–1 | Sri Pahang |

| 15 July 2022 9 | Terengganu | 2–1 | Kedah Darul Aman |

| 19 July 2022 10 | Sabah | 2–1 | Terengganu |

| 27 July 2022 11 | Negeri Sembilan | 2–1 | Terengganu |

| 1 August 2022 12 | Terengganu | 0–0 | Petaling Jaya City |

| 10 August 2022 13 | Terengganu | 1–2 | Johor Darul Ta'zim |

| 13 August 2022 14 | Terengganu | 1–0 | Sarawak United |

| 17 August 2022 15 | Selangor | 0–2 | Terengganu |

| 21 August 2022 16 | Sri Pahang | 1–2 | Terengganu |

| 3 September 2022 17 | Terengganu | 5–0 | Melaka United |

| 14 September 2022 18 | Terengganu | 3–0 | Penang |

| 1 October 2022 19 | Terengganu | 2–0 | Sabah |

| 7 October 2022 20 | Melaka United | 2–4 | Terengganu |

| 11 October 2022 21 | Kuala Lumpur City | 1–2 | Terengganu |

| 15 October 2022 22 | Kedah Darul Aman | 1–3 | Terengganu |

| Pos | Team | Pld | W | D | L | GF | GA | GD | Pts | Qualification or relegation |
|---|---|---|---|---|---|---|---|---|---|---|
| 1 | Johor Darul Ta'zim | 22 | 17 | 5 | 0 | 61 | 12 | +49 | 56 | Qualification for AFC Champions League group stage |
| 2 | Terengganu | 22 | 14 | 2 | 6 | 39 | 20 | +19 | 44 | Qualification for AFC Cup group stage |
| 3 | Sabah | 22 | 13 | 3 | 6 | 36 | 26 | +10 | 42 | Qualification for AFC Cup group stage |
| 4 | Negeri Sembilan | 22 | 12 | 5 | 5 | 33 | 26 | +7 | 41 | |
| 5 | Selangor | 22 | 8 | 6 | 8 | 39 | 33 | +6 | 30 | |

Updated to match(es) played on unknown. Source: MFL
Rules for classification: 1) Points; 2) Goal difference; 3) Number of goals scored.

=== Malaysia FA Cup ===
| 29 April 2022 First round | Terengganu | 2–1 | Negeri Sembilan | Gong Badak |
| 22:00 MYT (UTC+08:00) | Herold Goulon 28' (o.g); Faisal Halim 38'; Papé Diakité (yellow card) 81'; Shahrul Nizam (yellow card) 86' | Report | Omid Nazari 35'; Saiful Ridzuwan (yellow card) 78' | Stadium: Stadium Sultan Mizan Zainal Abidin; Attendance: 5,850; Referee: Suhaizi Shukri; Man of the Match: Kpah Sherman |

| 6 July 2022 Second round | Terengganu | 1–0 | Kedah Darul Aman | Gong Badak |
| 21:00 MYT (UTC+08:00) | Faiz Nasir 7'; Kpah Sherman (yellow card) 87' | Report | Akmal Zahir (yellow card) 17'; Rodney Celvin (yellow card) 55'; Dechi Marcel (yellow card) 89' | Stadium: Stadium Sultan Mizan Zainal Abidin; Attendance: 11,689; Referee: Mohd Amirul Izwan bin Yaacob; Man of the Match: Faisal Halim |

| 23 July 2022 Quarter-final | Terengganu | 4–1 | Kuching City | Gong Badak |
| 21:00 MYT (UTC+08:00) | Faiz Nasir 21'; Zuasyraf Zulkiefle (yellow card) 34'; Faisal Halim (yellow card) 36' (goal) 87'; Kipré Tchétché 73', 79' | Report | Amir Amri Salleh (yellow card) 36' (goal) 43' | Stadium: Stadium Sultan Mizan Zainal Abidin; Attendance: 20,500; Referee: Ahmad Zuhadi Dzulkilfi; Man of the Match: Kipré Tchétché |

| 6 August 2022 Semi-final | Terengganu | 1–1 (a.e.t.) (4–2 p) | Selangor |

| 10 September 2022 Final | Terengganu | 1–3 | Johor Darul Ta'zim |

=== Malaysia Cup ===
Knockout stage

| 27 October 2022 Round of 16 first leg | Sri Pahang | 1–5 | Terengganu |

| 1 November 2022 Round of 16 second leg | Terengganu | 4–2 (9–3 agg.) | Sri Pahang |

Terengganu won 9–3 on aggregate

| 6 November 2022 Quarter-finals first leg | Kuala Lumpur City | 0–1 | Terengganu |

| 12 November 2022 Quarter-finals second leg | Terengganu | 3–1 (4–1 agg.) | Kuala Lumpur City |

Terengganu won 4–1 on aggregate

| 16 November 2022 Semi-finals first leg | Selangor | 3–1 | Terengganu |

| 21 November 2022 Semi-finals second leg | Terengganu | 1–0 (2–3 agg.) | Selangor |

Terengganu loss 2–3 on aggregate

== Squad statistics ==
=== Terengganu ===
As of 27 January 2023

| No. | Pos. | Nat. | Name | League | | FA Cup | | Malaysia Cup | | Total | | | | | |
| No. | Pos. | Nat. | Name | Apps | Goals | Apps | Goals | Apps | Goals | Apps | Goals | | | | |
|---|---|---|---|---|---|---|---|---|---|---|---|---|---|---|---|
| No. | Pos. | Nat. | Name | 1 | GK | (Malaysia) | Rahadiazli Rahalim | 9 | 0 | 4 | 0 | 2 | 0 | 15 | 0 |
| 2 | DF | (Malaysia) | Arif Fadzilah | 10 | 0 | 2 | 0 | 4 | 0 | 16 | 0 | | | | |
| 4 | DF | (Malaysia) | Adib Zainudin | 5 | 0 | 1 | 0 | 2 | 0 | 8 | 0 | | | | |
| 5 | DF | (Malaysia) | Shahrul Nizam | 21 | 0 | 5 | 0 | 5 | 0 | 31 | 0 | | | | |
| 6 | MF | (Malaysia) | Azam Azmi | 19 | 0 | 5 | 0 | 6 | 1 | 30 | 1 | | | | |
| 7 | MF | (Malaysia) | Faisal Halim | 20 | 6 | 5 | 3 | 6 | 2 | 31 | 11 | | | | |
| 8 | MF | (Philippines) | Manuel Ott | 21 | 5 | 5 | 0 | 6 | 1 | 32 | 6 | | | | |
| 9 | FW | (Liberia) | Kpah Sherman | 14 | 6 | 3 | 0 | 5 | 7 | 22 | 13 | | | | |
| 10 | MF | (Bahrain) | Habib Haroon | 21 | 3 | 4 | 0 | 6 | 0 | 31 | 3 | | | | |
| 11 | FW | (Namibia) | Petrus Shitembi | 14 | 1 | 4 | 0 | 1 | 0 | 19 | 1 | | | | |
| 13 | DF | (Malaysia) | Hafizal Alias | 6 | 0 | 0 | 0 | 3 | 0 | 9 | 0 | | | | |
| 15 | MF | (Malaysia) | Faiz Nasir | 11 | 0 | 4 | 2 | 5 | 0 | 20 | 2 | | | | |
| 16 | MF | (Malaysia) | Hakimi Abdullah | 13 | 1 | 0 | 0 | 2 | 0 | 15 | 1 | | | | |
| 17 | FW | (Malaysia) | Arif Anwar | 6 | 0 | 0 | 0 | 0 | 0 | 6 | 0 | | | | |
| 18 | DF | (Malaysia) | Azalinullah Alias | 5 | 0 | 1 | 0 | 0 | 0 | 6 | 0 | | | | |
| 19 | FW | (Malaysia) | Syafik Ismail | 8 | 0 | 4 | 0 | 0 | 0 | 12 | 0 | | | | |
| 21 | GK | (Malaysia) | Syed Muhammad Nasrulhaq | 0 | 0 | 0 | 0 | 0 | 0 | 0 | 0 | | | | |
| 22 | DF | (Malaysia) | Hairiey Hakim | 6 | 0 | 2 | 0 | 0 | 0 | 8 | 0 | | | | |
| 23 | FW | (Ivory Coast) | Kipré Tchétché | 14 | 13 | 4 | 3 | 6 | 3 | 24 | 19 | | | | |
| 24 | DF | (Montenegro) | Argzim Redžović | 2 | 0 | 1 | 0 | 0 | 0 | 3 | 0 | | | | |
| 25 | DF | (Malaysia) | Alif Zakaria | 16 | 0 | 4 | 0 | 6 | 0 | 26 | 0 | | | | |
| 26 | MF | (Malaysia) | Syaiful Hakim | 0 | 0 | 0 | 0 | 0 | 0 | 0 | 0 | | | | |
| 27 | DF | (Malaysia) | Azarul Nazarith | 8 | 0 | 0 | 0 | 2 | 0 | 10 | 0 | | | | |
| 28 | MF | (Malaysia) | Rahmat Makasuf | 2 | 0 | 0 | 0 | 0 | 0 | 2 | 0 | | | | |
| 29 | FW | (Malaysia) | Engku Nur Shakir | 6 | 0 | 3 | 0 | 3 | 0 | 12 | 0 | | | | |
| 30 | MF | (Malaysia) | Zuasyraf Zulkiefle | 13 | 1 | 4 | 0 | 1 | 0 | 18 | 1 | | | | |
| 33 | GK | (Malaysia) | Shamirza Yusoff | 0 | 0 | 0 | 0 | 1 | 0 | 1 | 0 | | | | |
| 34 | DF | (Malaysia) | Safwan Mazlan | 0 | 0 | 0 | 0 | 0 | 0 | 0 | 0 | | | | |
| 38 | GK | (Malaysia) | Suhaimi Husin | 14 | 0 | 2 | 0 | 4 | 0 | 20 | 0 | | | | |
| 44 | DF | (Senegal) | Papé Diakité | 14 | 1 | 4 | 0 | 6 | 0 | 24 | 1 | | | | |
| 77 | MF | (Malaysia) | Nik Akif | 0 | 0 | 0 | 0 | 0 | 0 | 0 | 0 | | | | |
| 88 | MF | (Malaysia) | Nik Sharif Haseefy | 18 | 2 | 3 | 0 | 5 | 1 | 26 | 3 | | | | |
Players no longer at the club
| 14 | DF | (Philippines) | Luke Woodland | 1 | 0 | 0 | 0 | 0 | 0 | 1 | 0 | | | | |

=== Terengganu II ===
As of 17 September 2022

| No. | Pos. | Nat. | Name | League | | Total | | | | | |
| No. | Pos. | Nat. | Name | Apps | Goals | Apps | Goals | | | | |
|---|---|---|---|---|---|---|---|---|---|---|---|
| No. | Pos. | Nat. | Name | 1 | GK | (Malaysia) | Shafawi Mohamad | 3+1 | 0 | 4 | 0 |
| 3 | DF | (Malaysia) | Samsul Ikram | 0+5 | 0 | 5 | 0 | | | | |
| 5 | DF | (Malaysia) | Alif Zakaria | 9 | 0 | 9 | 0 | | | | |
| 6 | MF | (Malaysia) | Azfar Fikri | 10+1 | 0 | 11 | 0 | | | | |
| 7 | FW | (Malaysia) | Isa Raman | 0+1 | 0 | 1 | 0 | | | | |
| 8 | MF | (Malaysia) | Syaiful Haqim | 5+9 | 0 | 14 | 0 | | | | |
| 9 | FW | (Malaysia) | Fazli Ghazali | 8+8 | 8 | 16 | 8 | | | | |
| 10 | FW | (Malaysia) | Muslihuddin 'Atiq | 9+7 | 0 | 16 | 0 | | | | |
| 11 | MF | (Malaysia) | Ridzuan Razali | 5+6 | 0 | 11 | 0 | | | | |
| 15 | FW | (Malaysia) | Rahman Ab Rasid | 0+3 | 0 | 3 | 0 | | | | |
| 16 | FW | (Namibia) | Petrus Shitembi | 3 | 1 | 3 | 1 | | | | |
| 17 | FW | (Malaysia) | Hisyam Ismail | 0+4 | 0 | 4 | 0 | | | | |
| 19 | DF | (Malaysia) | Firdaus Rusdi | 8+4 | 0 | 12 | 0 | | | | |
| 20 | MF | (Malaysia) | Amirul Syazwan | 12+5 | 2 | 17 | 2 | | | | |
| 21 | MF | (Malaysia) | Syafiq Danial | 1+2 | 0 | 3 | 0 | | | | |
| 23 | DF | (Malaysia) | Aqil Irfanuddin (c)(c) | 15+1 | 0 | 16 | 0 | | | | |
| 24 | DF | (Malaysia) | Safwan Mazlan | 10+2 | 0 | 12 | 0 | | | | |
| 26 | DF | (Montenegro) | Argzim Redžović(c)(c)(c)(c)(c) | 13 | 1 | 13 | 1 | | | | |
| 27 | MF | (Malaysia) | Fakrul Wahid | 1+7 | 0 | 8 | 0 | | | | |
| 28 | FW | (Ghana) | Jordan Mintah(c)(c)(c)(c)(c)(c)(c)(c)(c) | 9 | 7 | 9 | 7 | | | | |
| 29 | GK | (Malaysia) | Nasrulhaq Bidin | 14 | 0 | 14 | 0 | | | | |
| 30 | FW | (Malaysia) | Izzan Syahmi | 2+9 | 1 | 11 | 1 | | | | |
| 34 | DF | (Philippines) | Luke Woodland | 12 | 0 | 12 | 0 | | | | |
| 36 | DF | (Malaysia) | Azam Azmi | 1 | 0 | 1 | 0 | | | | |
| 40 | MF | (Malaysia) | Zuasyraf Zulkiefle | 5 | 2 | 5 | 2 | | | | |
| 48 | DF | (Malaysia) | Hafizal Mohamad(c) | 6 | 0 | 6 | 0 | | | | |
| 50 | FW | (Malaysia) | Engku Nur Shakir | 8 | 0 | 8 | 0 | | | | |
| 51 | MF | (Malaysia) | Faiz Nasir | 3 | 1 | 3 | 1 | | | | |
| 52 | DF | (Malaysia) | Arif Fadzilah | 1 | 0 | 1 | 0 | | | | |
| 54 | DF | (Senegal) | Papé Diakité | 1 | 0 | 1 | 0 | | | | |
| 55 | FW | (Malaysia) | Hairiey Hakim | 5 | 0 | 5 | 0 | | | | |
| 61 | FW | (Malaysia) | Hakimi Abdullah | 3 | 2 | 3 | 2 | | | | |
| 66 | FW | (Malaysia) | Syafik Ismail | 3+1 | 1 | 4 | 1 | | | | |
| 71 | FW | (Malaysia) | Arif Anwar | 0+3 | 0 | 3 | 0 | | | | |
| 72 | DF | (Malaysia) | Azarul Nazarith | 2 | 0 | 2 | 0 | | | | |
| 81 | DF | (Malaysia) | Azalinullah Alias | 4 | 0 | 4 | 0 | | | | |
| 82 | FW | (Malaysia) | Rahmat Makasuf | 6+4 | 1 | 10 | 1 | | | | |
| 83 | GK | (Malaysia) | Suhaimi Husin(c) | 1 | 0 | 1 | 0 | | | | |
