= 2020 Terengganu F.C. I season =

Malaysia Super League football team

Terengganu
2020 season
- President: Dr. Samsuri Mokhtar
- Manager: Nafuzi Zain (caretaker)
- Stadium: Sultan Mizan Zainal Abidin Stadium
- Malaysia Super League: 3rd
- Malaysia FA Cup: Cancelled
- Malaysia Cup: Cancelled
- Top goalscorer: League: Dominique Da Sylva (9); All: Dominique Da Sylva (9)
Home colours	Away colours

The 2020 season was Terengganu's third season in the Malaysia Super League since the rebranding in 2017.

== Coaching staff ==
Position	Staff
Manager	(Malaysia) Nafuzi Zain
Assistant manager	(Malaysia) Mohamad Nik
Coaches	(Malaysia) Nafuzi Zain
Coaches	(Malaysia) Kamaruddin Annuar
Goalkeeping Coach	(Malaysia) Yazid Yassin

== Squad information ==
As of 28 November 2018

No.	Name	Nat	Position	Since	Date of birth (age)	Signed from
Goalkeepers
1	Rahadiazli Rahalim	(Malaysia) (Terengganu)	GK	2019	29 May 2001 (age 25)	Youth team
25	Ilham Amirullah	(Malaysia) (Terengganu)	GK	2019	26 February 1994 (age 32)	(Malaysia) Negeri Sembilan
31	Shamirza Yusoff	(Malaysia) (Terengganu)	GK	2019	7 June 1989 (age 37)	(Malaysia) Terengganu II
Defenders
2	Arif Fadzilah	(Malaysia) (Terengganu)	LB	2020	22 October 1997 (age 29)	(Malaysia) Felda United
3	Muhammad Faudzi	(Malaysia) (Terengganu)	CB	2019	12 April 1994 (age 32)	Youth team
4	Kamal Azizi	(Malaysia) (Terengganu)	RB	2018	20 August 1993 (age 33)	(Malaysia) Terengganu II
5	Babacar Diallo	(Senegal)	CB	2020	25 March 1989 (age 37)	(Finland) Kuopion Palloseura
13	Hafizal Mohamad	(Malaysia) (Terengganu)	CB	2015	21 January 1993 (age 33)	Youth Team
17	Nasrullah Haniff	(Malaysia) (Terengganu)	CB	2017	31 October 1996 (age 30)	(Malaysia) DRB-Hicom F.C.
18	Azalinullah Alias	(Malaysia) (Terengganu)	LB	2019	19 March 1996 (age 30)	(Malaysia) Petaling Jaya Rangers F.C.
27	Wan Amirzafran	(Malaysia) (Terengganu)	CB	2018	20 December 1994 (age 31)	(Malaysia) Harimau Muda
33	Argzim Redžović	(Montenegro)	CB	2020	26 February 1992 (age 34)	(Malaysia) Terengganu II
Midfielders
6	Nasir Basharudin	(Malaysia) (Perak)	MF	2020	29 March 1990 (age 36)	(Malaysia) Perak
7	Lee Tuck	(England)	AM / CM / DM	2018	30 June 1988 (age 38)	(Malaysia) Negeri Sembilan
15	Faiz Nasir	(Malaysia) (Kelantan)	MF	2020	21 July 1992 (age 34)	(Malaysia) Terengganu II
20	Sharin Sapien	(Malaysia) (Selangor)	MF	2020	12 April 1994 (age 32)	(Malaysia) Terengganu II
21	Hairiey Hakim	(Malaysia) (Terengganu)	MF			(Malaysia) Terengganu II
22	Sanjar Shaakhmedov	(Uzbekistan)	CM / AM	2019	23 September 1990 (age 36)	(Uzbekistan) Lokomotiv Tashkent
23	Azam Azmi	(Malaysia)	MF	2020		Youth Team
24	D. Saarvindran	(Malaysia) (Selangor)	MF	2020	4 October 1992 (age 34)	(Malaysia) Johor Darul Ta'zim II
28	Rahmat Makasuf	(Malaysia)	MF	2020	28 September 1997 (age 29)	(Malaysia) Terengganu II
30	Shukur Jusoh	(Malaysia) (Selangor)	MF	2020	28 February 1989 (age 37)	(Malaysia) Terengganu II
Forwards
10	Faris Ramli	(Singapore)	FW	2020	24 August 1992 (age 34)	(Singapore) Hougang United
11	Dominique Da Sylva	(Mauritania)	FW	2020	16 August 1989 (age 37)	(Vietnam) CLB Sài Gòn
14	Darren Lok	(Malaysia) (England)	FW	2020	14 December 1990 (age 35)	(Malaysia) Johor Darul Ta'zim II

== Transfers ==
=== In ===
No	Position	Player	Transferred From	Ref
5	DF	(Senegal) Babacar Diallo	(Finland) Kuopion Palloseura	
2	DF	(Malaysia) Arif Fadzilah	(Malaysia) Felda United	
15	MF	(Malaysia) Faiz Nasir	(Malaysia) Selangor F.C	
14	MF	(Malaysia) Nasir Basharudin	(Malaysia) Perak	
	MF	(Malaysia) D. Saarvindran	(Malaysia) Johor Darul Ta'zim II	
55	MF	(Malaysia) (United States) Wan Kuzain	(United States) Sporting Kansas City	
10	FW	(Singapore) Faris Ramli	(Singapore) Hougang United	
11	FW	(Mauritania) Dominique Da Sylva	(Vietnam) CLB Sài Gòn	
9	FW	(Malaysia) (England) Darren Lok	(Malaysia) Johor Darul Ta'zim II	

=== Out ===
No	Position	Player	Transferred To	Ref
27	GK	(Malaysia) Wan Azraie Wan Teh	(Malaysia) Sabah FA	
22	DF	(Malaysia) Adib Aizuddin		
26	DF	(Malaysia) Hasnizaidi Jamian		
19	MF	(Malaysia) Khairul Anwar	(Malaysia) Melaka United	
13	MF	(Malaysia) Khairu Azrin		
11	MF	(Malaysia) Syamim Yahya	(Malaysia) Melaka United	
9	MF	(Malaysia) Shahrul Aizad		
8	MF	(Cambodia) Thierry Bin	(Thailand) Sukhothai F.C.	
23	FW	(Ivory Coast) Kipré Tchétché	(Malaysia) Kedah	
10	FW	(Malaysia) Malik Ariff		
16	FW	(Malaysia) Khairul Izuan		
14	FW	(Malaysia) Nabil Latpi	(Malaysia) Kuala Lumpur FA	

=== Retained ===
No	Position	Player	Ref
1	GK	(Malaysia) Shafawi Mohamad	
25	GK	(Malaysia) Ilham Amirullah Razali	
7	MF	(England) Lee Tuck	
15	MF	(Uzbekistan) Sanjar Shaakhmedov	

== Friendlies ==
=== Pre-season Friendlies ===
20 December 2019 Friendly	Terengganu F.C. II (Malaysia)	0-0	(Malaysia) Terengganu F.C. I	Terengganu
				Stadium: Sultan Ismail Nasiruddin Shah Stadium

27 December 2019 Friendly	Kelantan FA (Malaysia)	3-3	(Malaysia) Terengganu F.C. I	Kota Bahru
			Dominique Da Sylva; D. Saarvindran	Stadium: Sultan Muhammad IV Stadium

1 January 2020 Friendly	Terengganu F.C. I (Malaysia)	10-0	(Malaysia) UMT FC	Terengganu
				Stadium: Sultan Ismail Nasiruddin Shah Stadium

10 January 2020 Friendly	Terengganu F.C. I (Malaysia)	2-1	(Malaysia) Kelantan United F.C.	Terengganu
	Arif Fadzilah 19'; Dominique Da Sylva 61'		Gassama Alfusainey	Stadium: Sultan Ismail Nasiruddin Shah Stadium

24 January 2020 Friendly	Terengganu F.C. I (Malaysia)	2-0	(Indonesia) Madura United	Terengganu
	Azalinullah Alias; Nasrullah Hanif			Stadium: Sultan Ismail Nasiruddin Shah Stadium

26 January 2020 Friendly	Terengganu F.C. I (Malaysia)	1-2	(Indonesia) Madura United	Terengganu
	Goal		Greg Nwokolo; Kevy Syahertian	Stadium: Sultan Ismail Nasiruddin Shah Stadium

11 February 2020 Friendly	Terengganu F.C. I (Malaysia)	6-0	(Malaysia) Kuala Terengganu Rovers	Terengganu
				Stadium: Sultan Ismail Nasiruddin Shah Stadium

18 February 2020 Friendly	Terengganu F.C. I (Malaysia)	4-1	(Malaysia) Pahang FA	Terengganu
	Dominique Da Sylva; Faris Ramli			Stadium: Sultan Ismail Nasiruddin Shah Stadium

21 February 2020 Friendly	Terengganu F.C. I (Malaysia)	3-0	(Malaysia) PDRM FA	Terengganu
	Dominique Da Sylva; Babacar Diallo			Stadium: Sultan Ismail Nasiruddin Shah Stadium

==== Tour of Kuala Lumpur ====
13 January 2020 Friendly	Terengganu F.C. I (Malaysia)	3-4	(Cambodia) Svay Rieng FC	Kuala Lumpur
	D. Saarvindran 5'; Dominique Da Sylva 10' 44'		Chea Samnang 68'; Pedro Augusto 76' (pen.) 90+2'	Stadium: UM Arena Stadium

14 January 2020 Friendly	Terengganu F.C. I (Malaysia)	0-1	(Malaysia) Kuala Lumpur FA	Kuala Lumpur
			Zhafri Yahya 16'	Stadium: Cheras Stadium

16 January 2020 Friendly	Terengganu F.C. I (Malaysia)	4-0	(Singapore) Hougang United	Kuala Lumpur
	Sanjar Shaakhmedov 10', 57'; Dominique Da Sylva 34', 75'			Stadium: UM Arena Stadium

==== Tour of Bangkok ====
30 January 2020 Friendly	Terengganu F.C. I (Malaysia)	0-2	(Thailand) Police Tero F.C.	Bangkok
				Stadium: Alpine Football Camp Training Center

1 February 2020 Friendly	Terengganu F.C. I (Malaysia)	1-1	(Thailand) Suphanburi F.C.	Bangkok
	Faiz Nasir 66'		Ryutaro Karube 35'	Stadium: Alpine Football Camp Training Center

3 February 2020 Friendly	Terengganu F.C. I (Malaysia)	2-3	(China) Tianjin TEDA F.C.	Bangkok
	Faiz Nasir; Sanjar Shakhmedov		Sandro Wagner; Johnathan	Stadium: Alpine Football Camp Training Center

=== Mid-season Friendlies ===
7 August 2020 Friendly	Kelantan United F.C. (Malaysia)	0-1	(Malaysia) Terengganu F.C. I	Kelantan
			Syafik Ismail	Stadium: Sultan Muhammad IV Stadium

11 August 2020 Friendly	Terengganu F.C. I (Malaysia)	2-0	(Malaysia) Kelantan FA	Terengganu
	Sanjar Shaakhmedov 3'; Faiz Nasir 64'			Stadium: Sultan Mizan Zainal Abidin Stadium

14 August 2020 Friendly	Selangor II (Malaysia)	0-0	(Malaysia) Terengganu F.C. I	Selangor
				Stadium: FAS Training Center

15 August 2020 Friendly	Selangor (Malaysia)	2-0	(Malaysia) Terengganu F.C. I	Selangor
	Rufino Segovia 20' 58'			Stadium: FAS Training Center

== Competitions ==
=== Malaysia Super League ===
==== League table ====
Pos	Team	Pld	W	D	L	GF	GA	GD	Pts	Qualification or relegation
1	Johor Darul Ta'zim (C, Q)	11	9	2	0	33	8	+25	29	Qualification for AFC Champions League group stage
2	Kedah (Q)	11	7	1	3	20	13	+7	22	Qualification for AFC Cup group stage
3	Terengganu (Q)	11	6	1	4	24	14	+10	19	Qualification for AFC Cup group stage
4	Perak	11	5	3	3	21	19	+2	18	
5	Selangor	11	4	5	2	26	19	+7	17	

Source: Malaysian Football League
Rules for classification: 1) Points; 2) Goal difference; 3) Number of goals scored.
(C) Champions; (Q) Qualified for the phase indicated

==== Matches ====
29 February 2020 1	Terengganu F.C. I	1-3	Perak	Terengganu
21:00 UTC+8	Sanjar Shaakhmedov 19'	Report	Guilherme 41' (pen.) 79'; Shahrul Saad 51'	Stadium: Sultan Ismail Nasiruddin Shah Stadium; Referee: Zamzidi Katimin

7 March 2020 2	Kedah	3-4	Terengganu F.C. I	Alor Setar
21:00 UTC+8	Renan Alves 20'; Kpah Sherman 23'; Kipré Tchétché 62'; Rizal Ghazali (yellow card) 63'	Report	Dominique Da Sylva 3' 65' 82' 84'; Arif Fadzilah (yellow card) 23'; Rahadiazli Rahalim (yellow card) 36'; Babacar Diallo (yellow card) 70'	Stadium: Darul Aman Stadium; Referee: Hasrol Bin Mohd Amir

11 March 2020 3	Terengganu F.C. I	3-3	Selangor	Terengganu
21:00 UTC+8	Rahmat Makasuf 43' (yellow card) 72'; Sanjar Shaakhmedov 64'; Lee Tuck 90+4' (pen.); Azalinullah Alias (yellow card) 79' (yellow-red card) 80'	Report	Ifedayo Olusegun 39'; Khyril Muhymeen 52'; Brendan Gan 70'; Taylor Regan (yellow card) 6'; Rodney Celvin (yellow card) 24'	Stadium: Sultan Ismail Nasiruddin Shah Stadium; Referee: Mohd Amirul Izwan Yaacob

22 August 2020 4 (Rescheduled)	Petaling Jaya City	0-2	Terengganu F.C. I	Selangor
21:00 UTC+8		Report	Dominique Da Sylva 30' 73'	Stadium: Petaling Jaya Stadium; Referee: Wan Mohamad Tarmizi

29 August 2020 5 (Rescheduled)	Terengganu F.C. I	4-0	Sabah	Terengganu
21:00 UTC+8	Dominique Da Sylva 12'; Sanjar Shaakhmedov 43' 71'; Faris Ramli 84'; Nasir Basharudin (yellow card) 75'	Report	Azzizan Nordin (yellow card) 12'	Stadium: Sultan Ismail Nasiruddin Shah Stadium; Referee: Mohd Amirul Izwan Yaacob

4 September 2020 6 (Rescheduled)	Melaka United	1-0	Terengganu F.C. I	Melaka
21:00 UTC+8	Uche Agba 60'; Wan Amirul Afiq (yellow card) 82'; Faris Shah Rosli (yellow card) 85'	Report		Stadium: Hang Jebat Stadium; Referee: Zulkifli Ahmad

11 September 2020 7 (Rescheduled)	Terengganu F.C. I	0-1	Johor Darul Ta'zim	Terengganu
21:00 UTC+8	Dominique Da Sylva (yellow card) 16'; Azalinullah Alias (yellow card) 63'	Report	Safawi Rasid 5'; Maurício (yellow card) 55'; Leandro Velazquez (yellow card) 62'	Stadium: Sultan Ismail Nasiruddin Shah Stadium; Referee: Wan Mohamad Tarmizi

19 September 2020 8 (Rescheduled)	UiTM FC	2-1	Terengganu F.C. I	Shah Alam
21:00 UTC+8	Arif Anwar 5'; Victor Nirennold 61'; Khuzaimi Piee (yellow card) 24' (yellow-red card) 72'; Rabih Ataya (yellow card) 76'; Danish Haziq (yellow card) 90+4'	Report	Lee Tuck 38' (pen.); Muhammad Faudzi (yellow card) 12' Arif Fadzilah (yellow card) 73'; D. Saarvindran (yellow card) 87'; Sharin Sapien (yellow card) 88'	Stadium: UiTM Stadium; Referee: Zamzidi Katimin

25 September 2020 9 (Rescheduled)	Terengganu F.C. I	4-0	PDRM FA	Terengganu
21:00 UTC+8	Faris Ramli 8' 75'; Lee Tuck 26' 45+2' (pen.)	Report	Dirga Surdi (yellow card) 60'; Amir Saiful (yellow card) 68'	Stadium: Sultan Ismail Nasiruddin Shah Stadium; Referee: Khairulazuan Kidam

3 October 2020 10 (Rescheduled)	Felda United	0-3	Terengganu F.C. I	Jengka
21:00 UTC+8	Ariff Farhan (yellow card) 22'; Jasazrin Jamaludin (yellow card) 52'; Nikola Raspopovic (yellow card) 63'	Report	Dominique Da Sylva 5'; Sanjar Shaakhmedov 38' (yellow card) 22'; Lee Tuck 65'	Stadium: Tun Abdul Razak Stadium; Referee: Fusser Mad Salleh

9 October 2020 11 (Rescheduled)	Terengganu F.C. I	2-1	Pahang	Terengganu
21:00 UTC+8	Dominique Da Sylva 16' (pen.); Lee Tuck 82'; Argzim Redzovic (yellow card) 23'; Azalinullah Alias (yellow card) 61'	Report	Nik Sharif Haseefy 13'; S. Kumaahran (yellow card) 42'; Helmi Eliza (yellow card) 45'	Stadium: Sultan Ismail Nasiruddin Shah Stadium; Referee: Nazmi Nasaruddin

=== Malaysia FA Cup ===
cancelled

=== Malaysia Cup ===
7 November 2020 Round 1	Terengganu F.C. I	1-0	Petaling Jaya City FC	Terengganu
21:00 UTC+8	Sanjar Shaakhmedov 37'; Lee Tuck (yellow card) 82'	Report	Amer Saidin (yellow card) 83'	Stadium: Sultan Ismail Nasiruddin Shah Stadium; Referee: Mohd Amirul Izwan Yaacob

== Statistics ==
=== Appearances and goals ===
No.	Pos.	Name	League		FA Cup		Malaysia Cup		Total	
No.	Pos.	Name	Apps	Goals	Apps	Goals	Apps	Goals	Apps	Goals
1	GK	(Malaysia) Rahadiazli Rahalim	5	0	0	0	1	0	6	0
2	DF	(Malaysia) Arif Fadzilah	11	0	0	0	1	0	12	0
3	DF	(Malaysia) Muhammad Faudzi	4	0	0	0	0	0	4	0
5	DF	(Senegal) Babacar Diallo	3	0	0	0	0	0	3	0
6	MF	(Malaysia) Nasir Basharudin	6(2)	0	0	0	1	0	9	0
7	MF	(England) Lee Tuck	11	6	0	0	1	0	12	6
9	FW	(Japan) Bruno Suzuki	1	0	0	0	0	0	1	0
10	MF	(Singapore) Faris Ramli	7(3)	3	0	0	1	0	11	3
11	FW	(Mauritania) Dominique Da Sylva	8	9	0	0	1	0	9	9
13	DF	(Malaysia) Hafizal Mohamad	9	0	0	0	0	0	9	0
14	FW	(Malaysia) (England) Darren Lok	0(4)	0	0	0	0(1)	0	5	0
15	MF	(Malaysia) Faiz Nasir	6(4)	0	0	0	1	0	11	0
17	DF	(Malaysia) Nasrullah Haniff	6(1)	0	0	0	1	0	8	0
18	DF	(Malaysia) Azalinullah Alias	7(2)	0	0	0	0(1)	0	10	0
20	DF	(Malaysia) Sharin Sapien	2(3)	0	0	0	0	0	5	0
21	MF	(Malaysia) Hairiey Hakim	0(2)	0	0	0	0	0	2	0
22	MF	(Uzbekistan) Sanjar Shaakhmedov	11	5	0	0	1	1	12	6
23	MF	(Malaysia) Azam Azmi	2(4)	0	0	0	1	0	7	0
24	MF	(Malaysia) D. Saarvindran	0(4)	0	0	0	0	0	4	0
25	GK	(Malaysia) Ilham Amirullah	1(1)	0	0	0	0	0	2	0
28	MF	(Malaysia) Rahmat Makasuf	1(3)	1	0	0	0	0	4	1
29	FW	(Malaysia) Syafik Ismail	4(1)	0	0	0	0(1)	0	6	0
30	MF	(Malaysia) Shukur Jusoh	0(2)	0	0	0	0(1)	0	3	0
31	GK	(Malaysia) Shamirza Yusoff	5	0	0	0	0	0	5	0
33	DF	(Montenegro) Argzim Redžović	8	0	0	0	1	0	9	0

Last updated: 2 August 2019.
Source: Soccerway

== Terengganu FC II ==
=== Appearances and goals ===
Players with no appearances not included in the list.

As of 9 October 2020

No.	Pos	Nat	Player	Total		League		Malaysia Cup	
No.	Pos	Nat	Player	Apps	Goals	Apps	Goals	Apps	Goals
1	GK	(Malaysia) MAS	Shafawi Mohamad	2	0	2	0	0	0
2	DF	(Malaysia) MAS	Samsul Ikram	5	0	4+1	0	0	0
3	MF	(Malaysia) MAS	Amir Ashraf	3	0	2+1	0	0	0
4	DF	(Malaysia) MAS	Radhi Yusof	2	0	0+2	0	0	0
5	DF	(Malaysia) MAS	Alif Zakaria	10	0	8+2	0	0	0
6	MF	(Malaysia) MAS	Dhiyaulrahman Mohd Hasry	2	0	2	0	0	0
7	DF	(Malaysia) MAS	Che Mohamad Arif	6	1	5+1	1	0	0
9	FW	(Malaysia) MAS	Fazli Ghazali	5	0	1+4	0	0	0
10	FW	(Japan) JPN	Bruno Suzuki	9	2	9	2	0	0
11	MF	(Malaysia) MAS	Ridzuan Razali	11	0	4+7	0	0	0
13	FW	(Malaysia) MAS	Firas Tarmizi	3	0	0+3	0	0	0
14	MF	(Malaysia) MAS	Zuasyraf Zulkiefle	10	2	7+3	2	0	0
15	MF	(Malaysia) MAS	Takhiyuddin Roslan	7	0	3+4	0	0	0
16	MF	(Malaysia) MAS	Izman Solehin	2	0	2	0	0	0
17	FW	(Malaysia) MAS	Ramzi Sufian	7	0	5+2	0	0	0
20	MF	(Malaysia) MAS	Amirul Syazwan	1	0	0+1	0	0	0
22	FW	(Malaysia) MAS	Engku Nur Shakir	11	4	8+3	4	0	0
23	DF	(Malaysia) MAS	Aqil Irfanuddin	11	0	11	0	0	0
24	GK	(Malaysia) MAS	Suhaimi Husin	9	0	9	0	0	0
25	MF	(Ivory Coast) CIV	Dechi Marcel	11	0	11	0	0	0
26	DF	(Montenegro) MNE	Argzim Redžović	5	1	5	1	0	0
27	DF	(Malaysia) MAS	Amirul Hafizul	7	0	7	0	0	0
28	FW	(Ghana) GHA	Jordan Mintah	11	7	11	7	0	0
30	FW	(Malaysia) MAS	Izzan Syahmi	5	0	0+5	0	0	0
63	FW	(Malaysia) MAS	Darren Lok	3	0	3	0	0	0
64	DF	(Senegal) SEN	Babacar Diallo	1	0	1	0	0	0
65	MF	(Singapore) SGP	Faris Ramli	1	0	1	0	0	0
