= Zuasyraf Zulkiefle =

Malaysian footballer

Personal information
- Birth name: Muhammad Zuasyraf bin Zulkiefle
- Date of birth: 27 April 1996 (age 30)
- Place of birth: Kuala Terengganu, Malaysia
- Height: 1.75 m (5 ft 9 in)
- Position: Midfielder

Team information
- Current team: Kelantan Red Warrior
- Number: 31

Senior career*
Years	Team	Apps	(Gls)
2019–2020	Terengganu II	10	(0)
2021–2025	Terengganu	26	(1)
2024–2025	→ Kelantan Darul Naim (loan)	16	(0)
2025–	Kelantan Red Warrior	1	(0)
- * Club domestic league appearances and goals as of 22 August 2025

Muhammad Zuasyraf bin Zulkiefle (born 27 April 1996) is a Malaysian professional footballer who plays as a midfielder for Malaysia A1 Semi-Pro League club Kelantan Red Warrior.

== Early life ==
He was born in Kampung Gong Tok Nasek, Kuala Terengganu. Zuasyraf received his early educations from Sekolah Kebangsaan Seri Budiman and Sekolah Menengah Panji Alam Kuala Terengganu.

== Club career ==
Zuasyraf started his professional career playing for Terengganu II having promoted to the first team in 2021. Early in the 2023 season, he was criticized for his performance.

== Career statistics ==
=== Club ===
As of match played 12 September 2024

Appearances and goals by club, season and competition
Club	Season	League			Cup (Note: Malaysia FA Cup)		League Cup (Note: Malaysia Cup)		Continental		Total	
Club	Season	Division	Apps	Goals	Apps	Goals	Apps	Goals	Apps	Goals	Apps	Goals
Terengganu II	2019	Malaysia Premier League	0	0	0	0	0	0	–		0	0
Terengganu II	2020	Malaysia Premier League	10	2	0	0	0	0	–		10	2
Terengganu II	Total		0	0	0	0	0	0	–		0	0
Terengganu	2021	Malaysia Super League	0	0	0	0	4	0	–		4	0
Terengganu	2022	Malaysia Super League	13	1	4	0	1	0	–		18	1
Terengganu	2023	Malaysia Super League	13	0	0	0	0	0	3	0	16	0
Terengganu	Total		26	1	4	0	5	0	3	0	38	1
Kelantan Darul Naim	2024–25	Malaysia Super League	6	0	0	0	0	0	–		6	0
Kelantan Darul Naim	Total		6	0	0	0	0	0	–		6	0
Career total			0	0	0	0	0	0	0	0	0	0

== Honours ==
Terengganu

- Malaysia Super League runner-up: 2022
