= Arif Fadzilah =

Malaysian footballer

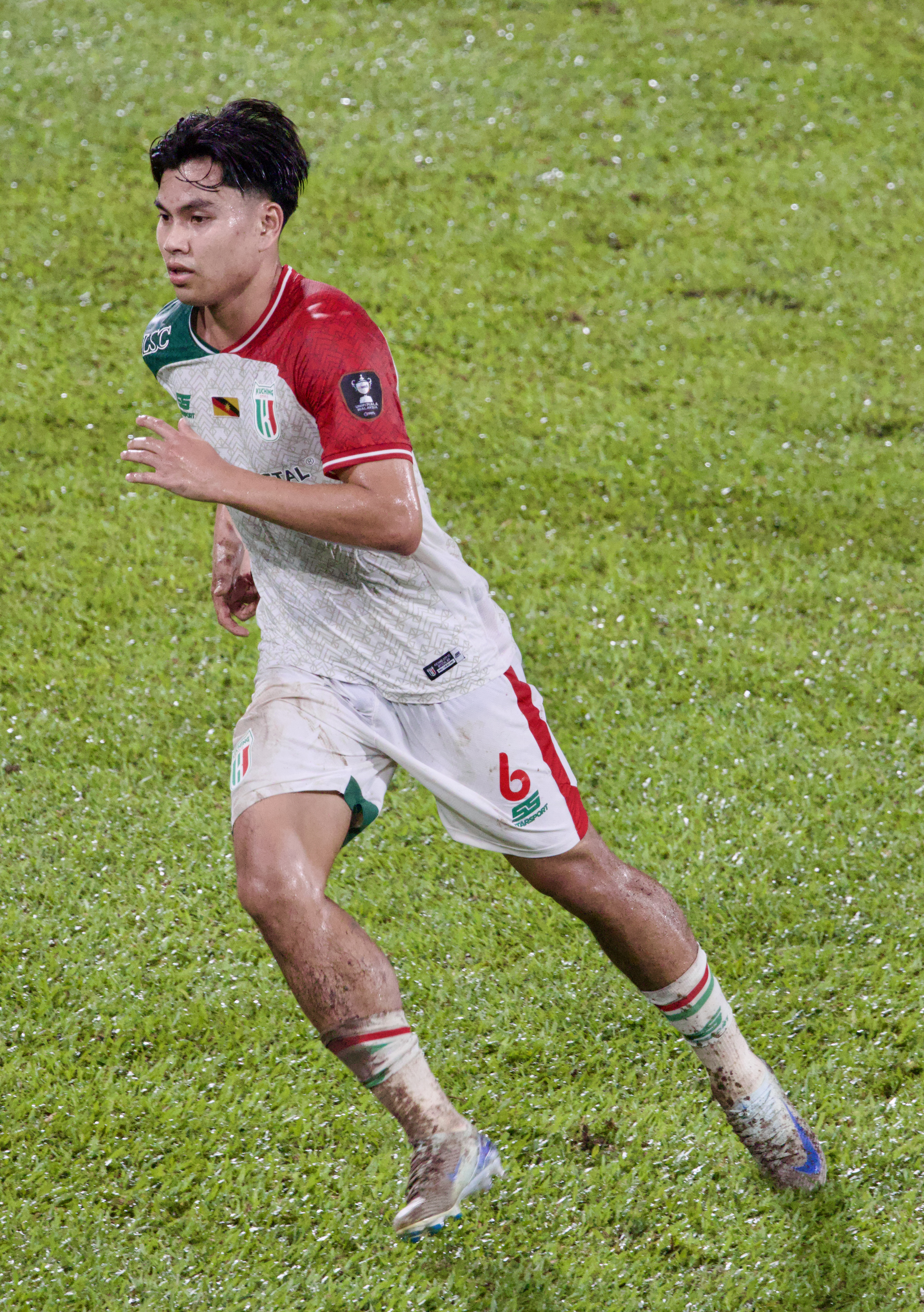
- Arif with Kuching City in 2025

Personal information
- Full name: Muhammad Arif Fadzilah bin Abu Bakar
- Date of birth: 20 April 1996 (age 30)
- Place of birth: Terengganu, Malaysia
- Height: 1.71 m (5 ft 7 1/2 in)
- Position: Left-back

Team information
- Current team: Kuching City (on loan from Terengganu)
- Number: 6

Youth career
- 2014–2015: T-Team U-21

Senior career*
Years	Team	Apps	(Gls)
2014–2017	T-Team	32	(0)
2018	Terengganu II	12	(0)
2019	Felda United	15	(0)
2020–	Terengganu	52	(0)
2024–	→ Kuching City (loan)	18	(0)

International career^{‡}
2013	Malaysia U19	6	(0)
2016–2017	Malaysia U23	9	(0)
2021	Malaysia	3	(0)
- * Club domestic league appearances and goals as of 4 June 2025 ‡ National team caps and goals as of 6 October 2021

Muhammad Arif Fadzilah bin Abu Bakar (born 20 April 1996) is a Malaysian professional footballer who plays as a left-back for Malaysia Super League club Kuching City, on loan from Terengganu.

== Career ==
=== Club career ===
Arif made his professional debut with T-Team in the 2014 Malaysia Super League match against Johor Darul Ta'zim on 18 April 2014. He come in as a substitute in the 41st minute of the match.

=== International career ===
On 23 September 2021, Arif received his first call-up to the Malaysia national team, for central training and friendly matches against Jordan and Uzbekistan.

== Career statistics ==
=== Club ===
As of match played 4 June 2025

Appearances and goals by club, season and competition
Club	Season	League (Note: Including Malaysia Charity Shield)			Cup		League Cup		Continental (Note: Including AFC Cup and AFC Champions League)		Total	
Club	Season	Division	Apps	Goals	Apps	Goals	Apps	Goals	Apps	Goals	Apps	Goals
T–Team	2014	Malaysia Super League	1	0	0	0	3	0	–		4	0
T–Team	2015	Malaysia Premier League	11	0	2	0	4	0	–		17	0
T–Team	2016	Malaysia Super League	12	0	0	0	6	0	–		18	0
T–Team	2017	Malaysia Super League	8	0	1	0	0	0	–		9	0
T–Team	Total		32	0	3	0	13	0	–		48	0
Terengganu II	2018	Malaysia Premier League	12	0	–		0	0	–		12	0
Terengganu II	Total		12	0	–		0	0	–		12	0
Felda United	2019	Malaysia Super League	15	0	2	0	2	0	–		19	0
Felda United	Total		15	0	2	0	2	0	–		19	0
Terengganu	2020	Malaysia Super League	11	0	–		1	0	–		12	0
Terengganu	2021	Malaysia Super League	19	0	–		6	0	–		25	0
Terengganu	2022	Malaysia Super League	10	0	2	0	4	0	–		16	0
Terengganu	2023	Malaysia Super League	12	0	3	0	2	0	5	0	22	0
Terengganu	Total		52	0	5	0	13	0	5	0	75	0
Kuching City (loan)	2024–25	Malaysia Super League	18	0	3	0	4	0	–		25	0
Kuching City (loan)	Total		0	0	0	0	0	0	–		0	0
Career total			99	0	7	0	26	0	0	0	132	0

=== International ===
As of match played 9 December 2021

Malaysia
Year	Apps	Goals
2021	3	0
Total	3	0
