= Jordan Mintah =

Ghanaian footballer

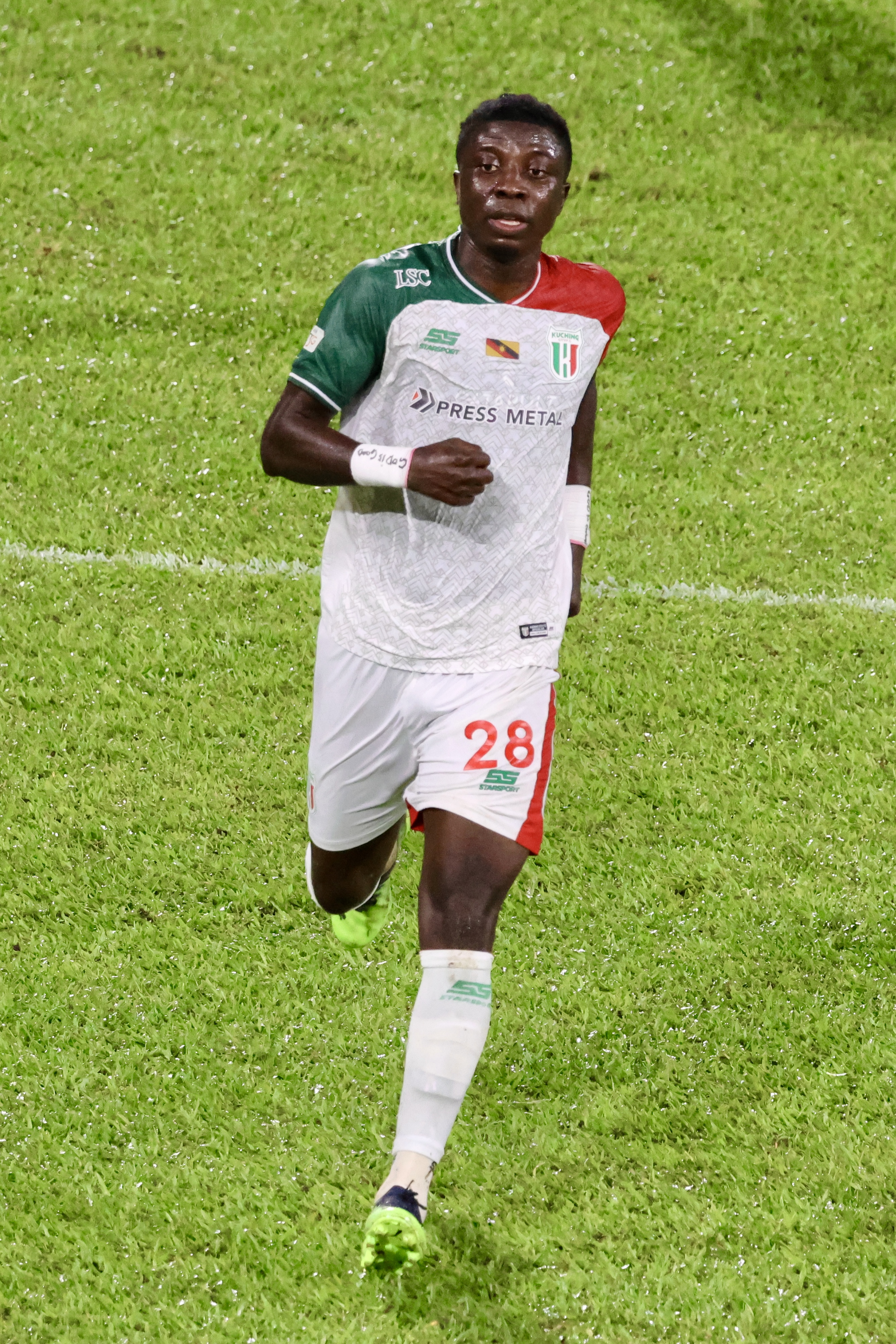
- Mintah with Kuching City in 2025

Personal information
- Full name: Jordan Owusu Mintah
- Date of birth: 2 September 1995 (age 31)
- Place of birth: Kumasi, Ghana
- Height: 1.82 m (5 ft 11 1/2 in)
- Position: Forward

Team information
- Current team: Terengganu
- Number: 82

Senior career*
Years	Team	Apps	(Gls)
2012–2013	Medeama	30	(29)
2013–2014	Emmanuel Stars	10	(6)
2014–2017	Stallion Laguna	10	(5)
2017–2019	Kaya–Iloilo	80	(65)
2020–2022	Terengganu II	32	(30)
2021–2023	Terengganu	16	(9)
2022	→ Kuala Lumpur City (loan)	10	(3)
2024–2026	Kuching City	25	(15)
2026–	Terengganu	5	(0)
- * Club domestic league appearances and goals as of 31 October 2026

Jordan Owusu Mintah (born 2 September 1995) is a Ghanaian professional footballer who plays as a forward for Malaysia Super League club Terengganu.

== Club career ==
In his native country, Mintah has played for Medeama and Emmanuel Stars.

In September 2014, Mintah moved to the Philippines to play for Stallion Laguna which was then playing in the United Football League. He make his debut on 8 February 2015 in a 1–0 win over Pachanga where he then scored his first goal on 21 February in a 2–1 loss to Global.

Mintah has scored over 17 goals for Kaya–Iloilo in the 2017 Philippines Football League, including three in a 5–2 victory over Ilocos United and a 7th-minute opener in a 2–0 win over Global. On 30 April 2019, Mintah scored his first career hat-trick during the 2019 AFC Cup group stage fixtures against Lao Toyota in a 5–1 win.

On 26 February 2025, Mintah scored a hat-trick for Kuching City in the Malaysia Super League match against Kelantan Darul Naim.

== International career ==
On 29 August 2025, Mintah has been naturalized as a Malaysian citizen after living in the country for five years.

On 2 October 2025, Mintah received a call-up to the Malaysia national team for the 2027 AFC Asian Cup qualification matches against Laos.

== Personal life ==
Mintah became a naturalised Malaysian citizen in August 2025.

== Career statistics ==
=== Club ===
As of match played 27 February 2025

Appearances and goals by club, season and competition
Club	Season	League			Cup (Note: Malaysia FA Cup)		League Cup		Continental (Note: AFC Cup)		Other		Total	
Club	Season	Division	Apps	Goals	Apps	Goals	Apps	Goals	Apps	Goals	Apps	Goals	Apps	Goals
Terengganu II	2020	Malaysia Premier League	11	7	–		–		–		–		11	7
Terengganu II	2021	Malaysia Premier League	12	16	–		–		–		–		12	16
Terengganu II	2022	Malaysia Premier League	9	7	–		–		–		–		9	7
Terengganu II	Total		32	30	–		–		–		–		32	30
Terengganu	2021	Malaysia Super League	6	4	0	0	8	5	0	0	0	0	14	9
Terengganu	2023	Malaysia Super League	10	5	3	2	0	0	0	0	0	0	13	7
Terengganu	Total		16	9	3	2	8	5	0	0	0	0	27	16
Kuala Lumpur City (loan)	2022	Malaysia Super League	10	3	0	0	2	0	3	1	0	0	15	4
Career total			58	42	3	2	10	5	3	1	0	0	74	50

== Honours ==
Kuala Lumpur City

- AFC Cup runner-up: 2022

Terengganu II

- MFL Cup: 2023
- Terengganu Chief Minister's Cup: 2022
