= Azam Azmi =

Malaysian footballer

Personal information
- Full name: Muhammad Azam bin Azmi Murad
- Date of birth: 12 February 2001 (age 25)
- Place of birth: Penang, Malaysia
- Height: 1.74 m (5 ft 9 in)
- Position: Right-back

Team information
- Current team: Terengganu (on loan from Johor Darul Ta'zim)
- Number: 6

Youth career
- 2018–2019: Terengganu IV
- 2019–2020: Terengganu II

Senior career*
| Years | Team | Apps | (Gls) |
| 2020–2024 | Terengganu | 81 | (3) |
| 2024– | Johor Darul Ta'zim | 0 | (0) |
| 2024– | → Terengganu (loan) | 20 | (0) |

International career^{‡}
| 2019–2020 | Malaysia U19 | 8 | (1) |
| 2023 | Malaysia U22 | 6 | (0) |
| 2021–2024 | Malaysia U23 | 12 | (0) |
| 2022– | Malaysia | 14 | (0) |
Medal record
Men's football
Representing Malaysia
Malaysia U-22
Merlion Cup
| Winner | 2023 |
Malaysia
Merdeka Cup
| Runner-up | 2023 |
| Winner | 2024 |
King's Cup
| Runner-up | 2022 |
AFF Championship
| Third place | 2022 |
- * Club domestic league appearances and goals ‡ National team caps and goals as of 17 November 2026

Muhammad Azam bin Azmi Murad (born 12 February 2001) is a Malaysian professional footballer who plays as a right-back for Malaysia Football league club Terengganu, on loan from Johor Darul Ta'zim, and the Malaysia national team.

== Club career ==
=== Early career ===
He began his youth football career with the Terengganu FC junior side Terengganu IV.

=== Terengganu ===
Beginning in 2020, he was included in the Terengganu senior squad. On 20 September 2023, Azam made his AFC Cup debut, starting in a 1–0 win over Central Coast Mariners.

=== Johor Darul Ta'zim ===
On 1 January 2024, Azam signed with Malaysia Super League champions Johor Darul Ta'zim.

== Career statistics ==
=== Club ===
As of match played 3 October 2025

Appearances and goals by club, season and competition
| Club | Season | League (Note: Including Malaysia Charity Shield) | | | Cup | | League Cup | | Continental (Note: Including AFC Cup, AFC Champions League, and ASEAN Club Championship) | | Total | |
| Club | Season | Division | Apps | Goals | Apps | Goals | Apps | Goals | Apps | Goals | Apps | Goals |
|---|---|---|---|---|---|---|---|---|---|---|---|---|
| Terengganu | 2020 | Malaysia Super League | 6 | 0 | – | | – | | – | | 6 | 0 |
| Terengganu | 2021 | Malaysia Super League | 19 | 1 | – | | 3 | 0 | – | | 22 | 1 |
| Terengganu | 2022 | Malaysia Super League | 19 | 0 | 5 | 0 | 6 | 1 | – | | 30 | 1 |
| Terengganu | 2023 | Malaysia Super League | 21 | 0 | 5 | 1 | 5 | 0 | 1 | 0 | 32 | 1 |
| Terengganu | Total | | 65 | 1 | 10 | 1 | 14 | 1 | 1 | 0 | 90 | 3 |
| Johor Darul Ta'zim | 2024–25 | Malaysia Super League | 0 | 0 | 0 | 0 | 0 | 0 | 0 | 0 | 0 | 0 |
| Johor Darul Ta'zim | Total | | 0 | 0 | 0 | 0 | 0 | 0 | 0 | 0 | 0 | 0 |
| Terengganu (loan) | 2024–25 | Malaysia Super League | 20 | 0 | 5 | 0 | 4 | 1 | 5 | 0 | 34 | 1 |
| Terengganu (loan) | 2025–26 | Malaysia Super League | 7 | 2 | 2 | 0 | 0 | 0 | 0 | 0 | 9 | 2 |
| Terengganu (loan) | Total | | 27 | 2 | 7 | 0 | 4 | 1 | 5 | 0 | 43 | 3 |
| Career total | | | 92 | 3 | 17 | 1 | 18 | 2 | 6 | 0 | 133 | 6 |

=== International ===
As of match played 20 June 2023

Malaysia
| Year | Apps | Goals |
|---|---|---|
| 2022 | 5 | 0 |
| 2023 | 2 | 0 |
| Total | 7 | 0 |

== Honours ==
Terengganu

- Malaysia Super League runner-up: 2022
- Malaysia FA Cup runner-up: 2022
- Malaysia Charity Shield runner-up: 2023
- Malaysia Cup runner-up: 2023

Malaysia

- King's Cup runner-up: 2022
- Merdeka Tournament: 2024; runner-up 2023

Malaysia U22

- Merlion Cup: 2023

ASEAN All-Stars

- Maybank Challenge Cup: 2025
