= Hakimi Abdullah =

Malaysian footballer (born 1999)

Personal information
- Birth name: Muhammad Hakimi bin Abdullah
- Date of birth: 9 November 1999 (age 27)
- Place of birth: Rantau Panjang, Kelantan, Malaysia
- Height: 1.70 m (5 ft 7 in)
- Position: Winger

Team information
- Current team: Negeri Sembilan
- Number: 17

Youth career
- –2020: Kelantan U21

Senior career*
| Years | Team | Apps | (Gls) |
| 2019–2020 | Kelantan | 26 | (4) |
| 2021–2025 | Terengganu | 34 | (6) |
| 2024–2025 | → Kelantan Darul Naim (loan) | 14 | (1) |
| 2025– | Negeri Sembilan | 9 | (0) |

International career^{‡}
| 2018 | Malaysia U19 | 0 | (0) |
| 2021–2023 | Malaysia U23 | 2 | (0) |
| 2021– | Malaysia | 2 | (0) |
- * Club domestic league appearances and goals as of 8 June 2026 ‡ National team caps and goals as of 9 October 2021

Muhammad Hakimi bin Abdullah (born 9 November 1999) is a Malaysian professional footballer who plays as a winger for Malaysia Football League club Negeri Sembilan, and the Malaysia national team.

== Club career ==
=== Kelantan ===
Hakimi made his senior debut on 10 October 2018 in Malaysia Cup.

=== Terengganu ===
On 14 March 2021, Hakimi signed a two-year contract with Terengganu.

In June 2025, Hakimi officially parted ways with Terengganu after four seasons with the club. Having made 50 appearances and scored 10 goals, the 24-year-old winger saw limited playing time in the new season due to stiff competition for places. This situation had earlier resulted in a loan move to Kelantan DN, before he ultimately decided to leave in pursuit of better career opportunities.

==== Loan to Kelantan ====
In September 2024, It was announced that Hakimi on a loan deal until the end of the season with Kelantan Darul Naim.

=== Negeri Sembilan ===
On June 18, 2025, Hakimi was announced as a new signing for Negeri Sembilan ahead of the 2025–26 season. At Negeri Sembilan, he trained under newly appointed head coach Nidzam Jamil.

== International career ==
On 23 September 2021, Hakimi received his first call-up to the Malaysia national team, for central training and friendly matches against Jordan and Uzbekistan.

== Honours ==
Terengganu

- Malaysia Super League runner-up: 2022
- Malaysia FA Cup runner-up: 2022
- Malaysia Cup runner-up: 2023
- Malaysia Charity Shield runner-up: 2023

== Career statistics ==
=== Club ===
As of match played 8 June 2026

Appearances and goals by club, season and competition
| Club | Season | League | | | Cup (Note: Malaysia FA Cup) | | League Cup (Note: Malaysia Cup) | | Continental | | Total | |
| Club | Season | Division | Apps | Goals | Apps | Goals | Apps | Goals | Apps | Goals | Apps | Goals |
|---|---|---|---|---|---|---|---|---|---|---|---|---|
| Kelantan | 2019 | Malaysia Premier League | 17 | 1 | 1 | 0 | 1 | 0 | – | | 19 | 1 |
| Kelantan | 2020 | Malaysia Premier League | 9 | 3 | 0 | 0 | 1 | 0 | – | | 10 | 3 |
| Kelantan | Total | | 26 | 4 | 1 | 0 | 2 | 0 | – | | 29 | 4 |
| Terengganu | 2021 | Malaysia Super League | 21 | 5 | – | | 5 | 0 | – | | 26 | 5 |
| Terengganu | 2022 | Malaysia Super League | 13 | 1 | 0 | 0 | 2 | 0 | – | | 15 | 1 |
| Terengganu | 2023 | Malaysia Super League | 9 | 3 | 3 | 1 | 0 | 0 | – | | 12 | 4 |
| Terengganu | Total | | 43 | 9 | 3 | 1 | 7 | 0 | 0 | 0 | 53 | 10 |
| Kelantan Darul Naim (loan) | 2024–25 | Malaysia Super League | 14 | 1 | 0 | 0 | 0 | 0 | – | | 14 | 1 |
| Kelantan Darul Naim (loan) | Total | | 14 | 1 | 0 | 0 | 0 | 0 | 0 | 0 | 14 | 1 |
| Negeri Sembilan | 2025–26 | Malaysia Super League | 9 | 0 | 2 | 0 | 2 | 0 | – | | 13 | 0 |
| Negeri Sembilan | 2026–27 | Malaysia Super League | 0 | 0 | 0 | 0 | 0 | 0 | – | | 0 | 0 |
| Negeri Sembilan | Total | | 9 | 0 | 2 | 0 | 2 | 0 | 0 | 0 | 13 | 0 |
| Career total | | | 92 | 10 | 6 | 1 | 11 | 0 | 0 | 0 | 109 | 15 |

=== International ===
As of 10 October 2021

| National team | Year | Apps | Goals |
|---|---|---|---|
Malaysia
| Malaysia | 2021 | 2 | 0 |
| Total | | 2 | 0 |
