= Shahrul Nizam =

Malaysian footballer

Personal information
- Full name: Mohamad Shahrul Nizam bin Ros Hasni
- Date of birth: 25 May 1998 (age 28)
- Place of birth: Bachok, Malaysia
- Height: 1.75 m (5 ft 9 in)
- Position: Centre-back

Team information
- Current team: Terengganu
- Number: 5

Youth career
- 2016–2017: Kelantan U21

Senior career*
Years	Team	Apps	(Gls)
2018–2020	Kelantan	37	(0)
2021–	Terengganu	90	(1)

International career
2018–2019	Malaysia U23		
- * Club domestic league appearances and goals as of 27 August 2025

Mohamad Shahrul Nizam bin Ros Hasni (born 25 May 1998) is a Malaysian professional footballer who plays as a centre-back for and captains Malaysia Super League club Terengganu.

== Club career ==
=== Terengganu FC ===
In November 2021, it was announced the Shahrul had agreed to sign contract with Terengganu FC. On 20 September 2023, Shahrul made his AFC Cup debut, starting in a 1–0 win over Central Coast Mariners.

== International career ==
Sharul Nizam represented the Malaysian national team at the 2019 Southeast Asian Games.

Shahrul Nizam also represented Malaysia at 2019 AFF U-22 Youth Championship.

== Career statistics ==
=== Club ===
As of match played 27 August 2025

Appearances and goals by club, season and competition
Club	Season	League			Cup		League Cup (Note: Includes Malaysia Cup, Malaysia Challenge Cup)		Continental		Total	
Club	Season	Division	Apps	Goals	Apps	Goals	Apps	Goals	Apps	Goals	Apps	Goals
Kelantan	2018	Malaysia Super League	9	0	0	0	6	0	–		15	0
Kelantan	2019	Malaysia Premier League	18	0	1	0	4	0	–		23	0
Kelantan	2020	Malaysia Premier League	10	0	–		–		–		10	0
Kelantan	Total		37	0	1	0	10	0	–		48	0
Terengganu	2021	Malaysia Super League	20	0	–		9	0	–		29	0
Terengganu	2022	Malaysia Super League	21	0	5	0	5	0	–		31	0
Terengganu	2023	Malaysia Super League	23	1	3	0	6	0	4	0	36	1
Terengganu	2024–25	Malaysia Super League	22	0	5	0	6	1	4	0	37	1
Terengganu	2025–26	Malaysia Super League	4	0	1	0	0	0	0	0	5	0
Terengganu	Total		90	1	14	0	26	1	8	0	138	2
Career Total			127	1	15	0	36	1	8	0	186	2

== Honours ==
Terengganu

- Malaysia Super League runner-up: 2022
- Malaysia FA Cup runner-up: 2022
- Malaysia Charity Shield runner-up: 2023
- Malaysia Cup runner-up: 2023
