= Suhaimi Husin =

Malaysian footballer

Personal information
- Birth name: Mohd Suhaimi bin Husin
- Date of birth: 9 August 1994 (age 32)
- Place of birth: Terengganu, Malaysia
- Height: 1.82 m (6 ft 0 in)
- Position: Goalkeeper

Team information
- Current team: Terengganu
- Number: 38

Youth career
- 2014: Hanelang
- 2015: T–Team U21

Senior career*
Years	Team	Apps	(Gls)
2015–2016	Terengganu	0	(0)
2017–2022	Terengganu II	32	(0)
2021–	Terengganu	64	(0)
- * Club domestic league appearances and goals as of 3 October 2025

Mohd Suhaimi bin Husin (born 9 August 1994) is a Malaysian professional footballer who plays for Malaysia Super League club Terengganu as a goalkeeper.

== Career statistics ==
=== Club ===
As of match played 27 August 2025

Appearances and goals by club, season and competition
Club	Season	League			Cup		League Cup		Continental		Total	
Club	Season	Division	Apps	Goals	Apps	Goals	Apps	Goals	Apps	Goals	Apps	Goals
Terengganu II	2017	Malaysia Super League	17	0	–		8	0	–		25	0
Terengganu II	2020	Malaysia Premier League	9	0	0	0	0	0	–		9	0
Terengganu II	2021	Malaysia Premier League	5	0	0	0	0	0	–		5	0
Terengganu II	2022	Malaysia Premier League	1	0	0	0	0	0	–		1	0
Terengganu II	Total		32	0	0	0	8	0	0	0	40	0
Terengganu	2021	Malaysia Super League	17	0	–		8	0	–		25	0
Terengganu	2022	Malaysia Super League	14	0	2	0	4	0	–		20	0
Terengganu	2023	Malaysia Super League	18	0	2	0	6	0	5 (Note: Appearances in AFC Cup)	0	31	0
Terengganu	2024–25	Malaysia Super League	8	0	1	0	0	0	2 (Note: Appearances in ASEAN Club Championship)	0	11	0
Terengganu	2025–26	Malaysia Super League	7	0	1	0	0	0	–		8	0
Terengganu	Total		64	0	6	0	18	0	7	0	95	0
Career Total			0	0	0	0	0	0	–	–	0	0

== Honours ==
=== Club ===
Terengganu II

- Malaysia Challenge Cup: 2018

Terengganu FC

- Malaysia Cup runner-up: 2023
