= Muhammad Faudzi =

Malaysian footballer

Personal information
- Full name: Muhammad bin Mohd Faudzi
- Date of birth: 27 February 1996 (age 30)
- Place of birth: Taiping, Perak, Malaysia
- Height: 1.77 m (5 ft 9 1/2 in)
- Position: Centre-back

Team information
- Current team: Kelantan Red Warrior
- Number: 3

Youth career
- Bukit Nenas Secondary School
- Bukit Jalil Sports School
- 2014: Harimau Muda C
- 2015: Felda United U21
- 2016–2018: Terengganu II

Senior career*
Years	Team	Apps	(Gls)
2019–2021	Terengganu	24	(1)
2021	→ Terengganu II (loan)	2	(0)
2022–2024	Kuala Lumpur City	18	(0)
2024–2025	Kelantan Darul Naim	6	(0)
2025–	Kelantan Red Warrior	1	(0)

International career^{‡}
2014	Malaysia U23	0	(0)
- * Club domestic league appearances and goals as of 22 August 2025 ‡ National team caps and goals as of 15 April 2016

Muhammad bin Mohd Faudzi (born 27 February 1996) is a Malaysian professional footballer who plays as a centre-back for Malaysia A1 Semi-Pro League club Kelantan Red Warrior.

== Club career ==
=== Kuala Lumpur City ===
On 19 February 2022, Muhammad signed a contract with Malaysia Super League club Kuala Lumpur City.

== Career statistics ==
=== Club ===
As of match played 17 May 2025

Appearances and goals by club, season and competition
Club	Season	League			Cup (Note: Appearances in Malaysia FA Cup)		League Cup		Continental (Note: Appearances in AFC Cup)		Other		Total	
Club	Season	Division	Apps	Goals	Apps	Goals	Apps	Goals	Apps	Goals	Apps	Goals	Apps	Goals
Terengganu	2019	Malaysia Super League	6	1	0	0	0	0	0	0	0	0	6	1
Terengganu	2020	Malaysia Super League	5	0	0	0	0	0	–		0	0	5	0
Terengganu	2021	Malaysia Super League	13	0	0	0	1	0	–		0	0	14	0
Terengganu	Total		24	1	0	0	1	0	0	0	0	0	25	1
Terengganu II (loan)	2021	Malaysia Premier League	2	0	–								2	0
Terengganu II (loan)	Total		2	0	0	0	0	0	0	0	0	0	2	0
Kuala Lumpur City	2022	Malaysia Super League	11	0	1	0	3	0	1	0	0	0	16	0
Kuala Lumpur City	2023	Malaysia Super League	7	0	0	0	2	0	–		0	0	9	0
Kuala Lumpur City	Total		18	0	1	0	5	0	1	0	0	0	25	0
Kelantan Darul Naim	2024–25	Malaysia Super League	6	0	0	0	0	0	0	0	0	0	6	0
Kelantan Darul Naim	Total		6	0	0	0	0	0	0	0	0	0	6	0
Kelatan Red Warrior	2025–26	Malaysia Super League	0	0	0	0	0	0	0	0	0	0	0	0
Kelatan Red Warrior	Total		0	0	0	0	0	0	0	0	0	0	0	0
Career total			0	0	0	0	0	0	–		0	0	0	0

== Honours ==
Kuala Lumpur City

- AFC Cup runner-up: 2022
