= Syafik Ismail =

Malaysian footballer

Personal information
- Full name: Muhammad Syafik bin Ismail
- Date of birth: 1 March 2000 (age 26)
- Place of birth: Marang, Terengganu, Malaysia
- Height: 1.63 m (5 ft 4 in)
- Position: Winger

Team information
- Current team: Star City
- Number: 18

Youth career
- 2018–2019: Terengganu IV

Senior career*
Years	Team	Apps	(Gls)
2020–2025	Terengganu	31	(0)
2021–2022	→ Terengganu II (loan)	22	(2)
2025–2026	Kelantan TRW	17	(1)
2026–	Star City	0	(0)

International career^{‡}
2022	Malaysia U23	4	(0)
- * Club domestic league appearances and goals as of July 2026 ‡ National team caps and goals as of 23 May 2022

Muhammad Syafik bin Ismail (born 1 March 2000) is a Malaysian professional footballer who plays as a winger for Malaysia Super League team Star City.

== Career statistics ==
=== Club ===
As of match played 24 May 2023

Club	Season	League			Cup		League Cup		Continental		Total	
Club	Season	Division	Apps	Goals	Apps	Goals	Apps	Goals	Apps	Goals	Apps	Goals
Terengganu	2020	Malaysia Super League	5	0	–		1	0	–		6	0
Terengganu	2021	Malaysia Super League	0	0	0	0	1	0	–		1	0
Terengganu	2022	Malaysia Super League	8	0	4	0	0	0	–		12	0
Terengganu	2023	Malaysia Super League	12	0	2	1	–	–	–	–	14	1
Terengganu	2024–25	Malaysia Super League	6	0	0	0	0	0	–	–	6	0
Terengganu	Total		31	0	6	1	2	0	0	0	39	1
Terengganu II (loan)	2021	Malaysia Premier League	18	1	–		–		–		18	1
Terengganu II (loan)	2022	Malaysia Premier League	4	1	–		–		–		4	1
Terengganu II (loan)	Total		22	2	0	0	0	0	0	0	22	2
Career total			0	0	0	0	0	0	0	0	0	0

== Honours ==
Terengganu

- Sheikh Kamal International Club Cup: 2019
- Malaysia Super League runner-up: 2022
