= Sardor Kulmatov =

Uzbek footballer (born 1994)

Personal information
- Full name: Sardor Kulmatov
- Date of birth: 22 August 1994 (age 32)
- Place of birth: Uzbekistan
- Height: 1.85 m (6 ft 1 in)
- Position: Centre-back

Team information
- Current team: Buxoro
- Number: 5

Youth career
- –2014: Sogdiana Jizzakh U21

Senior career*
Years	Team	Apps	(Gls)
2014–2016	Neftchi Fergana	7	(1)
2017–2022	Sogdiana Jizzakh	129	(1)
2023	Terengganu	14	(1)
2024	Sogdiana Jizzakh	14	(0)
2025–	Buxoro	25	(1)
- * Club domestic league appearances and goals as of 28 July 2026

Sardor Kulmatov (born 22 August 1994) is an Uzbek professional footballer who plays as a centre-back for the Uzbekistan Super League club Buxoro.

== Club career ==
=== Sogdiana ===
Kulmatov started his career with Sogdiana. He was voted 2018 Player of the Year.

=== Terengganu ===
On 2 January 2023, Kulmatov signed a one-year contract with Malaysia Super League club Terengganu.

=== Sogdiana ===
On 4 January 2024, Kulmatov

== International career ==
Kulmatov has been called up for the Uzbekistan national football team.

== Style of play ==
Besides center-back, he can play as left-back, right-back, and defensive midfielder. He is known for his height and physicality.

== Honours ==
Sogdiana

- Uzbekistan Super League: 2021

Individual

- Sogdiana – Player of the Year: 2018

Terengganu FC

- Malaysia Cup runner-up: 2023
- Malaysia Charity Shield runner-up: 2023
