= Suhaizi Shukri =

Malaysian football referee

- Full name: Suhaizi bin Shukri
- Born: 23 November 1979 (age 46); Jitra, Malaysia
- Other occupation: Teacher

Domestic
Years	League	Role
2011	Indonesia Super League	Referee
2011–	Malaysia Super League	Referee
2011–	Malaysia Premier League	Referee

International
Years	League	Role
2011–	FIFA listed	Referee

Suhaizi Shukri (born 23 November 1979) is an international association football referee from Malaysia. He became a FIFA referee in 2011.

== Career ==
Suhaizi Shukri became a professional referee in 2011 and has been an Malaysia Super League referee since 2011. He officiated numerous matches in the AFC Champions League and the AFC Cup. For the first international club duty, he been selected as a fourth official, between match Brisbane Roar vs FC Tokyo on 6 March 2012 in 2012 AFC Champions League.

Suhaizi also been selected as a fourth official for the 2015 AFC Asian Cup qualification, 2018 FIFA World Cup qualification (AFC) and 2019 AFC Asian Cup qualification.

On 13 March 2013, he was the first Malaysian referee to officiate in an Indonesia Super League match (ISL).
