= Rahmat Makasuf =

Malaysian footballer

Personal information
- Full name: Mohammad Rahmat bin Makasuf
- Date of birth: 28 September 1997 (age 29)
- Place of birth: Kuala Berang, Malaysia
- Height: 1.65 m (5 ft 5 in)
- Position: Winger

Team information
- Current team: Kedah FA
- Number: 22

Youth career
- Hanelang
- 2018: Terengganu III
- 2019: Terengganu II

Senior career*
Years	Team	Apps	(Gls)
2019–2024	Terengganu	24	(4)
2023–2024	→ Penang (loan)	19	(1)
2024–2025	Penang	11	(1)
2025–	Kedah FA	0	(0)
- * Club domestic league appearances and goals as of 31 December 2022

Mohammad Rahmat bin Makasuf (born 28 September 1997) is a Malaysian professional footballer who plays as a winger for Kedah FA. Rahmat plays mainly as a right winger.
