= Alif Zakaria =

Malaysian footballer

Personal information
- Full name: Muhammad Alif bin Zakaria
- Date of birth: 24 June 1998 (age 28)
- Place of birth: Kuala Terengganu, Malaysia
- Height: 1.79 m (5 ft 10 1/2 in)
- Position: Defender

Team information
- Current team: Terengganu
- Number: 25

Youth career
- 2018–2019: Terengganu III

Senior career*
Years	Team	Apps	(Gls)
2020–2022	Terengganu II	10	(0)
2021–	Terengganu	53	(1)
- * Club domestic league appearances and goals as of 4 December 2024

Muhammad Alif bin Zakaria (born 24 June 1998) is a Malaysian professional footballer who plays as a defender for Malaysia Super League club Terengganu.

Born in Kampung Paya Datu, Manir, Kuala Terengganu, Alif went to Sekolah Menengah Kebangsaan Jeram.

== Club career ==
=== Early career ===
He began his youth football career with the Terengganu FC junior side Terengganu III.

=== Terengganu ===
Beginning in 2021, he was included in the Terengganu senior squad. On 20 September 2023, Alif made his AFC Cup debut, starting in a 1–0 win over Central Coast Mariners.

== Honours ==
Terengganu

- Malaysia Super League runner-up: 2022
- Malaysia FA Cup runner-up: 2022
- Malaysia Cup runner-up: 2023
- Malaysia Charity Shield runner-up: 2023

== Personal life ==
On April 1, 2022, he officially married with Fifyana.
