= Sharin Sapien =

Malaysian footballer

Personal information
- Full name: Muhammad Sharin bin Sapien
- Date of birth: 12 April 1994 (age 32)
- Place of birth: Kuala Terengganu, Malaysia
- Height: 1.69 m (5 ft 6 1/2 in)
- Position: Central midfielder

Team information
- Current team: Terengganu FC

Senior career*
Years	Team	Apps	(Gls)
2012–2014	T-Team	12	(0)
2015–2017	Terengganu FC	17	(1)
2017–2018	Terengganu FC II	36	(6)
2019–	Terengganu FC	24	(1)
- * Club domestic league appearances and goals as of 22 November 2018

Muhammad Sharin bin Sapien (born 12 April 1994) also known as Potek by local fans is a Malaysian footballer who plays for Terengganu FC in the Malaysia Super League as a central midfielder.
