= Azarul Nazarith =

Malaysian footballer

Personal information
- Full name: Muhammad Azarul Nazarith bin Azhar
- Date of birth: 2 July 1998 (age 28)
- Place of birth: Setapak, Malaysia
- Height: 1.75 m (5 ft 9 in)
- Position: Centre-back

Team information
- Current team: Bunga Raya
- Number: 27

Youth career
- 2018: Felda United U21

Senior career*
Years	Team	Apps	(Gls)
2019–2020	Felda United	11	(0)
2021–2023	Terengganu	18	(0)
2024–2025	PT Athletic	12	(0)
2025–	Bunga Raya	12	(1)
- * Club domestic league appearances and goals

Muhammad Azarul Nazarith bin Azhar (born 2 July 1998) is a Malaysian professional footballer who plays as a centre-back.

Born in Setapak, Kuala Lumpur, Azarul went to Sekolah Kebangsaan Wangsa Melawati and Victoria Institution.
