= 2025–26 Terengganu FC season =

Terengganu
2025–26 season
- President: Hishamuddin Abdul Karim
- CEO: Sheikh Farouk Sheikh Mohamed Al-Bajrai
- Head coach: Badrul Afzan (until 25 December); Tengku Hazman (interim; from 25 December)
- Stadium: Sultan Mizan Zainal Abidin Stadium
- Malaysia Super League: TBD
- Malaysia FA Cup: Quarter-finals
- Malaysia Cup: Quarter-finals
- Top goalscorer: League: Yann Mabella (6 goals); All: Yann Mabella (8 goals)
Home colours	Away colours

The 2024–25 season is Terengganu's Eighth season in the Malaysia Super League having been promoted from the Malaysia Premier League at the end of the 2016 season. In addition to the domestic league, the club will participate in the Malaysia FA Cup.

== Coaching staff ==
Position	Name	Ref.
Team manager	(Malaysia) Mohd Sabri Abas	
Assistant team manager	(Malaysia) Mohammed Sekanther Abdul Hamed	
Head coach	(Malaysia) Badrul Afzan	
Assistant head coach	(Malaysia) Tengku Hazman	
Goalkeeping coach	(Malaysia) Syamsuri Mustafa	
Fitness coach	(Malaysia) Efindy Salleh	
Assistant fitness coach	(Malaysia) Shaiful Hazmi	
Team doctor	(Malaysia) Mohd Shahrul Faiz Mohd Noor	
Physiotherapist	(Malaysia) Zulkifli Mohd Zin	
Team admin	(Malaysia) Syed Ahmad Rahimi	
Team analyst	(Malaysia) Muhammad Amirul Mustaqim	
Masseur	(Malaysia) Muhamad Faiz Manja	
Kitmen	(Malaysia) Ismail A. Rahman (Malaysia) Mohd Fakhruddin Mohamad (Malaysia) Muhamad Norhisham Basri (Malaysia) Rosdi Talib	

== Players ==
Note: Flags indicate national team as defined under FIFA eligibility rules; some limited exceptions apply. Players may hold more than one non-FIFA nationality.

No.	Pos.	Nation	Player
1	GK	MAS	Rahadiazli Rahalim
3	DF	MAS	Ubaidullah Shamsul
4	DF	BRA	Diego Landis
5	DF	MAS	Shahrul Nizam (captain)
6	DF	MAS	Azam Azmi (on loan from Johor Darul Ta'zim)
7	FW	MAS	Akhyar Rashid
10	MF	UZB	Nurillo Tukhtasinov
11	FW	CGO	Yann Mabella
13	MF	MAS	Khalai'f Naskam
14	MF	MAS	Akram Mahinan
15	DF	MAS	Faris Rifqi
17	FW	MAS	Engku Shakir
19	FW	CMR	Junior Sam
21	DF	MAS	Syafiq Danial

No.	Pos.	Nation	Player
22	DF	MAS	Hairiey Hakim
23	DF	MYA	Kyaw Min Oo
24	DF	MAS	Safwan Mazlan
25	DF	MAS	Alif Zakaria
26	MF	BRA	Careca
28	GK	MAS	Nazul Izamil
29	GK	MAS	Syed Nasrulhaq
33	MF	MAS	Saiful Jamaluddin
38	GK	MAS	Suhaimi Husin
44	MF	MAS	Ikhwan Hafizo
46	FW	MAS	Syahmi Zamri
69	MF	MAS	Azziq Zahazani
77	MF	MAS	Baqiuddin Shamsudin

== Transfers ==
=== Transfers in ===
No.	Position	Player	Transferred from	Type/fee	Date	Ref.
	DF	(Malaysia) Arif Fadzilah	Kuching City	End of loan	31 May 2025	
	MF	(Malaysia) Faiz Nasir	Kedah Darul Aman	End of loan	31 May 2025	
	MF	(Malaysia) Zuasyraf Zulkiefle	Kelantan Darul Naim	End of loan	31 May 2025	
	MF	(Malaysia) Hakimi Abdullah	Kelantan Darul Naim	End of loan	31 May 2025	
	DF	(Malaysia) Aqil Irfanuddin	Penang	End of loan	31 May 2025	
	MF	(Malaysia) Saiful Jamaluddin	Sri Pahang	Free transfer	24 June 2025	
	MF	(Malaysia) Baqiuddin Shamsudin	Sri Pahang	Free transfer	25 June 2025	
	FW	(Cameroon) Junior Ngong Sam	(Philippines) One Taguig	Free transfer	2 July 2025	
	FW	(Brazil) Gabriel Silva	(Cambodia) Svay Rieng	Free transfer	3 July 2025	
	FW	(Republic of the Congo) Yann Mabella	(Luxembourg) Racing-Union	Free transfer	5 July 2025	
	MF	(Brazil) Careca	(South Korea) Gangneung Citizen	Free transfer	6 July 2025	
	DF	(Myanmar) Kyaw Min Oo	PDRM	Free transfer	29 September 2025	

=== Transfers out ===
No.	Position	Player	Transferred to	Type/fee	Date	Ref.
7	FW	(Croatia) Ivan Mamut	Unattached	End of contract	17 May 2025	
8	MF	(Philippines) Manny Ott	(Thailand) Rayong	Free	10 June 2025	
9	FW	(Nigeria) Ismahil Akinade	Unattached	End of contract	10 June 2025	
11	FW	(Malaysia) Safawi Rasid	Johor Darul Ta'zim	End of loan	30 June 2025	
18	MF	(Malaysia) Hakim Hassan	Unattached	End of contract	30 June 2025	
19	MF	(Malaysia) Syafik Ismail	Unattached	End of contract	30 June 2025	
21	MF	(Malaysia) Syaiful Hakim	Unattached	End of contract	30 June 2025	
23	DF	(Malaysia) Azam Azmi	Johor Darul Ta'zim	End of loan	30 June 2025	
36	DF	(Montenegro) Argzim Redžović	Perak	End of contract	23 May 2025	
99	FW	(El Salvador) Nelson Bonilla	Unattached	End of contract	10 June 2025	
	MF	(Malaysia) Faiz Nasir	Kelantan Red Warrior	End of contract	31 May 2025	
	MF	(Malaysia) Hakimi Abdullah	Negeri Sembilan	End of contract	31 May 2025	
	MF	(Malaysia) Zuasyraf Zulkiefle	Kelantan Red Warrior	End of contract	31 May 2025	
9	FW	(Brazil) Gabriel Silva	(Indonesia) Arema	End of contract	1 January 2026	

== Competitions ==
=== Overview ===
Competition	First match	Last match	Starting round	Final position	Record							
Competition	First match	Last match	Starting round	Final position	Pld	W	D	L	GF	GA	GD	Win %
Malaysia Super League	10 August 2025	15 May 2026	Matchday 1	5th	24	10	6	8	39	34	+5	41.67
Malaysia FA Cup	17 August 2025	28 October 2025	Round of 16	Quarter-finals	4	2	0	2	7	7	+0	50.00
Malaysia Cup	19 January 2026	15 February 2026	Round of 16	Quarter-finals	4	2	1	1	9	3	+6	50.00
Total					32	14	7	11	55	44	+11	43.75

Source: Competitions

=== Malaysia Super League ===
10 August 2025 1	Penang	0–3	Terengganu	George Town
21:00 UTC+8		Report	Azam 49'; Gabriel 55'; Khalai'f 89'	Stadium: City Stadium; Attendance: 4,809; Referee: Muhammad Khairulsyahmi Ahmad Khalidi

13 August 2025 2	Terengganu	2–2	PDRM	Kuala Nerus
21:00 UTC+8	Azam 63'; Mabella 90' (pen.)	Report	Doumbia 13', 56'	Stadium: Sultan Mizan Zainal Abidin Stadium; Attendance: 6,251; Referee: Muhammad Nazmi Nasaruddin

22 August 2025 3	DPMM (Brunei)	0–5	Terengganu	Bandar Seri Begawan
20:15 UTC+8	Careca 1', 75' (pen.); Tukhtasinov 16'; Mabella 86'; Syahmi 90+2'	Report		Stadium: Hassanal Bolkiah National Stadium; Attendance: 5,425; Referee: Abang Azharudin Abdullah

27 August 2025 4	Selangor	5–2	Terengganu	Petaling Jaya
20:15 UTC+8		Report	Gabriel 70' (pen.); Junior 82'	Stadium: Petaling Jaya Stadium; Attendance: 6,055; Referee: Ahmad Zuhadi Dzulkifli

19 September 2025 5	Terengganu	4–0	Melaka	Kuala Nerus
21:00 UTC+8	Mabella 26', 45+5'; Tukhtasinov 34'; Careca 45+2'	Report		Stadium: Sultan Mizan Zainal Abidin Stadium; Attendance: 4,530; Referee: Muhammad Shukor Zulkiflee

27 September 2025 6	Kuala Lumpur City	1–0	Terengganu	Cheras
17:00 UTC+8	Josué 83' (pen.)	Report		Stadium: Kuala Lumpur Stadium; Attendance: 1,551; Referee: Tuan Mohd Yaasin Tuan Mohd Hanafiah

3 October 2025 7	Terengganu	4–1	Kelantan The Real Warriors	Kuala Nerus
21:00 UTC+8	Landis 23'; Tukhtasinov 30'; Mabella 40', 73'	Report	Saravanan 51'	Stadium: Sultan Mizan Zainal Abidin Stadium; Attendance: 2,957; Referee: Mohammad Zamzaidi Katimin

Pos	Team	Pld	W	D	L	GF	GA	GD	Pts
3	Selangor	24	16	4	4	59	20	+39	52
4	Kuala Lumpur City	24	12	7	5	40	29	+11	43
5	Terengganu	24	10	6	8	39	34	+5	36
6	Immigration	24	9	5	10	38	43	−5	32
7	Negeri Sembilan	24	6	11	7	39	35	+4	29

Updated to match(es) played on 17 May 2026. Source: Malaysian Football League
Rules for classification: 1) Points; 2) Goal difference; 3) Number of goals scored.

=== Malaysia FA Cup ===
Round of 16

17 August 2025 First leg	Immigration	2–1	Terengganu	Batu Kawan
17:00 UTC+8	Rafael 54'; João Pedro 90+1'	Report	Mabella 50'	Stadium: Penang State Stadium; Attendance: 410; Referee: Muhammad Khairulsyahmi Ahmad Khalidi

13 September 2025 Second leg	Terengganu	3–0 (4–2 agg.)	Immigration	Kuala Terengganu
21:00 UTC+8	Sam 18'; Akhyar 32', 54'	Report		Stadium: Sultan Mizan Zainal Abidin Stadium; Attendance: 4,870; Referee: Muhammad Izzul Fikri Kamaruzaman

Quarter-finals

17 October 2025 First leg	Terengganu	1–4	Kuching City	Kuala Terengganu
21:00 UTC+8	Mabella 68'	Report	Ngah 9', 13'; Danial 53'; Mabella 82' (o.g.)	Stadium: Sultan Mizan Zainal Abidin Stadium; Referee: Mohd Hasrol Mohd Amir

28 October 2025 Second leg	Kuching City	1–2 (5–3 agg.)	Terengganu	Kuching
21:00 UTC+8	Ngah 32' (pen.)	Report	Careca 12', 90+3'	Stadium: Sarawak Stadium Stadium; Referee: Mohd Fusser Mad Sallih

== Statistics ==
=== Appearances and goals ===
No.	Pos	Nat	Player	Total		Malaysia Super League		Malaysia FA Cup		Malaysia Cup	
No.	Pos	Nat	Player	Apps	Goals	Apps	Goals	Apps	Goals	Apps	Goals
Goalkeepers
1	GK	(Malaysia) MAS	Rahadiazli Rahalim	1	0	0+1	0	0	0	0	0
29	GK	(Malaysia) MAS	Syed Nasrulhaq	2	0	0	0	2	0	0	0
38	GK	(Malaysia) MAS	Suhaimi Husin	9	0	7	0	2	0	0	0
Defenders
3	DF	(Malaysia) MAS	Ubaidullah Shamsul	7	0	3	0	2+2	0	0	0
4	DF	(Brazil) BRA	Diego Landis	11	1	7	1	3+1	0	0	0
5	DF	(Malaysia) MAS	Shahrul Nizam	10	0	7	0	3	0	0	0
6	DF	(Malaysia) MAS	Azam Azmi	11	2	7	2	4	0	0	0
24	DF	(Malaysia) MAS	Safwan Mazlan	9	0	4+1	0	1+3	0	0	0
25	DF	(Malaysia) MAS	Alif Zakaria	8	0	2+3	0	3	0	0	0
Midfielders
10	MF	(Uzbekistan) UZB	Nurillo Tukhtasinov	11	3	7	3	4	0	0	0
13	MF	(Malaysia) MAS	Khalai'f Naskam	8	1	0+5	1	0+3	0	0	0
14	MF	(Malaysia) MAS	Akram Mahinan	9	0	5+2	0	2	0	0	0
23	MF	(Myanmar) MYA	Kyaw Min Oo	3	0	0+1	0	1+1	0	0	0
26	MF	(Brazil) BRA	Careca	11	5	7	3	4	2	0	0
33	MF	(Malaysia) MAS	Saiful Jamaluddin	7	0	0+5	0	1+1	0	0	0
77	MF	(Malaysia) MAS	Baqiuddin Shamsudin	9	0	4+2	0	2+1	0	0	0
Forwards
7	FW	(Malaysia) MAS	Akhyar Rashid	8	2	5	0	2+1	2	0	0
11	FW	(Republic of the Congo) CGO	Yann Mabella	10	8	7	6	2+1	2	0	0
17	FW	(Malaysia) MAS	Engku Shakir	3	0	0+2	0	1	0	0	0
19	FW	(Cameroon) CMR	Junior Sam	8	2	0+4	1	2+2	1	0	0
46	FW	(Malaysia) MAS	Syahmi Zamri	4	1	0+4	1	0	0	0	0
Players transferred/loaned out during the season
9	FW	(Brazil) BRA	Gabriel Silva	8	2	4+1	2	3	0	0	0

Last updated: 28 October 2025
Source: Competitions
