= 2024–25 Terengganu FC season =

Terengganu
2024–25 season
- President: Hishamuddin Abdul Karim
- CEO: Mohd Sabri Abas
- Head coach: Badrul Afzan
- Stadium: Sultan Mizan Zainal Abidin Stadium
- Malaysia Super League: 5th
- Malaysia FA Cup: Semi-finals
- Malaysia Cup: Semi-finals
- ASEAN Club Championship: Group stage
- Top goalscorer: League: Safawi Rasid (7); All: Safawi Rasid (18)
Home colours	Away colours	Third colours

The 2024–25 season was Terengganu's Seventh season in the Malaysia Super League having been promoted from the Malaysia Premier League at the end of the 2016 season. In addition to the domestic league, the club participated in the Malaysia FA Cup, the Malaysia Cup and the ASEAN Club Championship.

== Players ==
=== First-team squad ===
As of 11 January 2025

Note: Flags indicate national team as defined under FIFA eligibility rules; some limited exceptions apply. Players may hold more than one non-FIFA nationality.

No.	Pos.	Nation	Player
1	GK	MAS	Rahadiazli Rahalim
3	DF	MAS	Ubaidullah Shamsul ^{U23}
5	DF	MAS	Shahrul Nizam
7	FW	CRO	Ivan Mamut ^{I}
9	FW	NGA	Ismahil Akinade ^{I}
11	FW	MAS	Safawi Rasid (on loan from Johor Darul Ta'zim) (captain)
14	MF	MAS	Akram Mahinan
15	DF	MAS	Faris Rifqi
18	MF	MAS	Hakim Hassan
19	MF	MAS	Syafik Ismail
20	DF	MAS	Hairiey Hakim Mamat
22	FW	MAS	Engku Shakir

No.	Pos.	Nation	Player
23	DF	MAS	Azam Azmi (on loan from Johor Darul Ta'zim)
24	DF	MAS	Safwan Mazlan ^{U23}
25	DF	MAS	Alif Zakaria
29	GK	MAS	Syed Nasrulhaq
33	FW	MAS	Akhyar Rashid
36	DF	MNE	Argzim Redžović ^{I}
38	GK	MAS	Suhaimi Husin
46	MF	MAS	Syahmi Zamri
88	MF	MAS	Nik Sharif Haseefy
97	MF	UZB	Nurillo Tukhtasinov ^{A}
99	FW	SLV	Nelson Bonilla ^{I}

=== Out on loan ===
Note: Flags indicate national team as defined under FIFA eligibility rules; some limited exceptions apply. Players may hold more than one non-FIFA nationality.

No.	Pos.	Nation	Player
—	DF	MAS	Arif Fadzilah Abu Bakar (at Kuching City)
—	MF	MAS	Faiz Nasir (at Kedah Darul Aman)
—	MF	MAS	Zuasyraf Zulkiefle (at Kelantan Darul Naim)

No.	Pos.	Nation	Player
—	DF	MAS	Aqil Irfanuddin (at Penang)
—	MF	MAS	Hakimi Abdullah (at Kelantan Darul Naim)

Remarks:

^{I} These players are registered as International.
^{A} These players are registered as Asian.
^{S} These players are registered as ASEAN.
^{U23} These players are registered as Under-23.

^{U19} These players are registered as Under-19.

== Competitions ==
=== Overview ===
Competition	First match	Last match	Starting round	Final position	Record							
Competition	First match	Last match	Starting round	Final position	Pld	W	D	L	GF	GA	GD	Win %
Malaysia Super League	11 May 2024	20 April 2025	Matchday 1	5th	24	9	8	7	35	26	+9	37.50
Malaysia FA Cup	14 June 2024	3 August 2024	Round of 16	Semi-finals	5	4	0	1	13	7	+6	80.00
Malaysia Cup	23 November 2024	1 February 2025	Round of 16	Semi-finals	6	3	1	2	11	9	+2	50.00
ASEAN Club Championship	21 August 2024	5 February 2025	Group stage	Group stage	5	2	1	2	13	9	+4	40.00
Total					40	18	10	12	72	51	+21	45.00

Last updated: 20 April 2025
Source: Competitions

=== Malaysia Super League ===
==== League table ====
Pos	Team	Pld	W	D	L	GF	GA	GD	Pts	Qualification or relegation
3	Sabah	24	11	7	6	41	33	+8	40	
4	Kuching City	24	10	9	5	38	28	+10	39	
5	Terengganu	24	9	8	7	35	26	+9	35	
6	Kuala Lumpur City	24	11	4	9	40	33	+7	31 (Note: On 5 Aug 2024, Kuala Lumpur City were deducted six points for inaccurate or false declarations in their club licensing application.)	
7	Perak	24	8	6	10	36	36	0	30	Withdrawn from Super League (Note: Perak and Sri Pahang withdrew at end of season and dissolved. Not applying for a national licence.)

Source: MFL
Rules for classification: 1) Points; 2) Goal difference; 3) Goals scored;

==== Matches ====
Win Draw Loss

11 May 2024 1	Terengganu	3–1	Perak	Kuala Terengganu
21:00	Tukhtasinov 6'; Shivan 66' (o.g.); Chijioke 81'	Report	Guaycochea 61'	Stadium: Sultan Mizan Zainal Abidin Stadium; Attendance: 8,150; Referee: Suhaizi Shukri

19 May 2024 2	Penang	0–0	Terengganu	Penang
20:15		Report		Stadium: City Stadium; Attendance: 4,557; Referee: S. Logeswaran

24 May 2024 3	Terengganu	3–0	Kelantan Darul Naim	Kuala Terengganu
20:15	Akinade 36' (pen.); Tukhtasinov 45'; Ott 48'	Report		Stadium: Sultan Mizan Zainal Abidin Stadium; Attendance: 13,411; Referee: Muhammad Shukor Zulkiflee

22 June 2024 4	Kuching City	1–1	Terengganu	Kuching
20:15	Tanigawa 81'	Report	Safawi 50' (pen.)	Stadium: Sarawak Stadium; Attendance: 2,658; Referee: Amirul Izwan Yaacob

26 July 2024 5	Johor Darul Ta'zim	4–0	Terengganu	Iskandar Puteri
20:15	Heberty 7'; Bérgson 32' (pen.), 64', 90+2'	Report		Stadium: Sultan Ibrahim Stadium; Attendance: 21,365; Referee: Fitri Maskon

30 July 2024 6	Terengganu	3–2	Negeri Sembilan	Kuala Terengganu
21:00	Safawi 45+2'; Chijioke 49'; Akhyar 59'	Report	Mika 16'; Faye 52'	Stadium: Sultan Mizan Zainal Abidin Stadium; Attendance: 3,750; Referee: Muhammad Khairulsyahmi Ahmad Khalidi

10 August 2024 7	Kuala Lumpur City	0–2	Terengganu	Kuala Lumpur
21:00		Report	Ott 45+13'; Safawi 70'	Stadium: Kuala Lumpur Stadium; Attendance: 1,376; Referee: Tuan Mohd Yaasin Tuan Mohd Hanafiah

16 August 2024 8	Terengganu	1–1	Sri Pahang	Kuala Terengganu
20:15	Tukhtasinov 45+2'	Report	Brundo 90+3'	Stadium: Sultan Mizan Zainal Abidin Stadium; Attendance: 5,211; Referee: Mohd Hasrol Mohd Amir

15 September 2024 9	Sabah	1–1	Terengganu	Kota Kinabalu
20:15	João Pedro 11'	Report	Akinade 45+1'	Stadium: Likas Stadium; Attendance: 5,602; Referee: Ahmad Dzuhadi Dzulkifli

28 September 2024 10	Terengganu	0–1	Selangor	Kuala Terengganu
21:00		Report	Fernández 1'	Stadium: Sultan Mizan Zainal Abidin Stadium; Attendance: 4,419; Referee: Ahmad Zuhadi Dzulkifli

4 October 2024 11	Terengganu	1–1	PDRM	Kuala Terengganu
21:00	Bonilla 44'	Report	Osuchukwu 53'	Stadium: Sultan Mizan Zainal Abidin Stadium; Attendance: 4,081; Referee: Mohd Hasrol Mohd Amir

19 October 2024 12	Kedah Darul Aman	1–0	Terengganu	Alor Setar
21:00	Cleylton 45+6'	Report		Stadium: Darul Aman Stadium; Attendance: 3,281; Referee: Ahmad Zuhadi Dzulkifli

26 October 2024 13	Perak	2–2	Terengganu	Seri Manjung
17:00	Milunović 9' (pen.); Guaycochea 57' (pen.)	Report	Bonilla 44'; Nik 90+4' (pen.)	Stadium: Manjung Municipal Council Stadium; Attendance: 2,602; Referee: Razlan Joffri Ali

1 November 2024 14	Terengganu	1–0	Penang	Kuala Terengganu
21:00	Ubaidullah 27'	Report		Stadium: Sultan Mizan Zainal Abidin Stadium; Attendance: 3,211; Referee: Suhaizi Shukri

4 December 2024 15	Kelantan Darul Naim	1–2	Terengganu	Kota Bharu
17:00	Kharoub 90+5' (pen.)	Report	Alif 11'; Safawi 65'	Stadium: Sultan Muhammad IV Stadium; Attendance: 187; Referee: Zamzaidi Katimin

25 January 2025 16	Terengganu	0–1	Johor Darul Ta'zim	Kuala Terengganu
21:00		Report	Muñiz 13'	Stadium: Sultan Mizan Zainal Abidin Stadium; Attendance: 2,046; Referee: Ahmad Zuhadi Dzulkifli

9 February 2025 17	Negeri Sembilan	0–2	Terengganu	Paroi
21:00		Report	Tukhtasinov 26'; Bonilla 80' (pen.)	Stadium: Tuanku Abdul Rahman Stadium; Attendance: 694; Referee: Firdaus Dahlan

14 February 2025 18	Terengganu	1–2	Kuala Lumpur City	Kuala Terengganu
21:00	Safwan 16'	Report	Josué 45+1'; Reichelt 83'	Stadium: Sultan Mizan Zainal Abidin Stadium; Attendance: 1,103; Referee: Amirul Izwan Yaacob

21 February 2025 19	Terengganu	2–2	Kuching City	Kuala Terengganu
21:00	Ott 8'; Akinade 61'	Report	Mintah 64'; Shitembi 66'	Stadium: Sultan Mizan Zainal Abidin Stadium; Attendance: 853; Referee: Tuan Mohd Yaasin Tuan Mohd Hanafiah

27 February 2025 20	Sri Pahang	1–5	Terengganu	Temerloh
21:00	Agüero 40'	Report	Akhyar 3'; Safawi 20'; Safwan 28'; Akinade 59'; Ott 89'	Stadium: Temerloh Mini Stadium; Attendance: 746; Referee: Muhammad Izzul Fikri Kamaruzaman

7 March 2025 21	Terengganu	2–2	Sabah	Kuala Terengganu
22:00	Akinade 24'; Safawi 84'	Report	Wilkin 20'; Saddil 87'	Stadium: Sultan Mizan Zainal Abidin Stadium; Attendance: 1,483; Referee: Ahmad Zuhadi Dzulkifli

5 April 2025 22	Selangor	1–0	Terengganu	Petaling Jaya
20:15	Fortes 88'	Report		Stadium: Petaling Jaya Stadium; Attendance: 2,453; Referee: Muhammad Khairulsyahmi Ahmad Khalidi

12 April 2025 23	PDRM	1–0	Terengganu	Selayang
20:15	Imran 48'	Report		Stadium: Selayang Municipal Council Stadium; Attendance: 200; Referee: S.Logeswaran

20 April 2025 24	Terengganu	3–0	Kedah Darul Aman	Kuala Terengganu
21:00	Safawi 45+4'; Ubaidullah 75'; Tukhtasinov 90+1'	Report		Stadium: Sultan Mizan Zainal Abidin Stadium; Attendance: 4,281; Referee: Zamzaidi Katimin

=== Malaysia FA Cup ===
14 June 2024 Round of 16	Terengganu	2–1	Perak	Kuala Terengganu
21:00 UTC+8	Safawi 36' (pen.); Pilj 42'	Report	Luiz Motta 6'	Stadium: Sultan Mizan Zainal Abidin Stadium; Attendance: 20,150; Referee: Zamzaidi Katimin

28 June 2024 Quarter-finals 1	Terengganu	4–0	Sabah	Kuala Terengganu
21:00	Ott 9'; Akinade 37', 45+3'; Pilj 42'	Report		Stadium: Sultan Mizan Zainal Abidin Stadium; Attendance: 15,677; Referee: Mohd Hasrol Mohd Amir

6 July 2024 Quarter-finals 2	Sabah	0–3 (0–7 agg.)	Terengganu	Kota Kinabalu
19:15	Safawi 10'; Akhyar 43'; Pilj 88'	Report		Stadium: Likas Stadium; Attendance: 3,834; Referee: Tuan Mohd Yaasin Tuan Mohd Hanafiah

19 July 2024 Semi-finals 1	Terengganu	3–2	Selangor	Kuala Terengganu
21:00	Safawi 30'; Tukhtasinov 35'; Akinade 70'	Report	Fortes 39'; Al-Rawabdeh 48'	Stadium: Sultan Mizan Zainal Abidin Stadium; Attendance: 31,689; Referee: Mohd Hasrol Mohd Amir

3 August 2024 Semi-finals 2	Selangor	4–1 (6–4 agg.)	Terengganu	Petaling Jaya
21:00	Safuwan 3' (6), 54'; Reziq 90+3'	Report	Akinade 22'	Stadium: Petaling Jaya Stadium; Attendance: 10,569; Referee: Muhammad Usaid Jamal

=== Malaysia Cup ===
23 November 2024 Round of 16 first leg	Melaka	1–4	Terengganu	Krubong
21:00	Issah 55'	Report	Safawi 8'; Akhyar 15' (pen.), 54'; Alif 90'	Stadium: Hang Jebat Stadium; Attendance: 2,880; Referee: Tuan Mohd Yaasin Tuan Mohd Hanafiah

29 November 2024 Round of 16 second leg	Terengganu	0–0 (4–1 agg.)	Melaka	Kuala Terengganu
21:00		Report		Stadium: Sultan Mizan Zainal Abidin Stadium; Attendance: 898; Referee: Amirul Izwan Yaacob

14 December 2024 Quarter-finals first leg	Negeri Sembilan	0–2	Terengganu	Paroi
17:00		Report	Safawi 20'; Bonilla 86' (pen.)	Stadium: Tuanku Abdul Rahman Stadium; Attendance: 1,040; Referee: Muhammad Usaid Jamal

21 December 2024 Quarter-finals second leg	Terengganu	4–2 (6–2 agg.)	Negeri Sembilan	Kuala Terengganu
21:00	Akhyar 41'; Safawi 45+5'; Azam 82'; Shahrul 90+4' (pen.)	Report	Hadin 25' (pen.); Anbualagan 34'	Stadium: Sultan Mizan Zainal Abidin Stadium; Attendance: 6,225; Referee: Mohd Hasrol Mohd Amir

17 January 2025 Semi-finals first leg	Terengganu	0–4	Johor Darul Ta'zim	Kuala Terengganu
21:00		Report	Morales 17'; Arif 79', 85'; Bérgson 90+3'	Stadium: Sultan Mizan Zainal Abidin Stadium; Attendance: 6,225; Referee: Mohd Hasrol Mohd Amir

1 February 2025 Semi-finals second leg	Johor Darul Ta'zim	2–1 (6–1 agg.)	Terengganu	Iskandar Puteri
17:30	Heberty 32', 90+2'	Report	Akinade 59'	Stadium: Sultan Ibrahim Stadium; Attendance: 23,081; Referee: S. Logeswaran

=== ASEAN Club Championship ===
==== Group stage ====
Pos	Team	Pld	W	D	L	GF	GA	GD	Pts	Qualification	BGP	PSM	PKS	TNG	DOA	SHU
2	(Indonesia) PSM Makassar	5	3	1	1	8	4	+4	10	Advance to Semi-finals	0–0				3–0	4–3
3	(Cambodia) Preah Khan Reach Svay Rieng	5	2	1	2	8	7	+1	7 (Note: Ranked on head-to-head points: Preah Khan Reach Svay Rieng (3); Terengganu (0).)			0–1				4–2
4	(Malaysia) Terengganu	5	2	1	2	13	9	+4	7			1–0	2–3		2–2	
5	(Vietnam) Dong A Thanh Hoa	5	1	3	1	6	7	−1	6				0–0			3–1
6	(Myanmar) Shan United	5	0	0	5	7	20	−13	0		1–4			0–5		

Source: ASEAN United FC
Rules for classification: Tiebreakers
Notes:

21 August 2024 1	Terengganu (Malaysia)	2–3	(Cambodia) Preah Khan Reach Svay Rieng	Kuala Terengganu
21:00	Ott 55'; Safawi 90+1' (pen.)	Report	Gabriel Silva 12'; Pablo Augusto 16'; Ratanak 86'	Stadium: Sultan Mizan Zainal Abidin Stadium; Referee: Wong Wai Lun (Hong Kong)

25 September 2024 2	Terengganu (Malaysia)	2–2	(Vietnam) Dong A Thanh Hoa	Kuala Terengganu
21:00	Akhyar 20'; Ott 39'	Report	Luiz Antônio 45+2'; Ubaidullah 52' (o.g.)	Stadium: Sultan Mizan Zainal Abidin Stadium; Referee: Koji Takasaki (Japan)

8 January 2025 3	Shan United (Myanmar)	0–5	(Malaysia) Terengganu	Yangon
19:30		Report	Safawi 11' (pen.); Ott 25', 63'; Akhyar 45+7' (pen.), 72'	Stadium: Thuwunna Stadium; Referee: Koji Takasaki (Japan)

22 January 2025 4	Terengganu (Malaysia)	1–0	(Indonesia) PSM Makassar	Kuala Terengganu
21:00	Safawi 65' (pen.)	Report		Stadium: Sultan Mizan Zainal Abidin Stadium; Referee: Asker Nadjafaliev (Uzbekistan)

5 February 2025 5	BG Pathum United (Thailand)	4–3	(Malaysia) Terengganu	Pathum Thani
19:30	Raniel 71', 77'; Notsuda 83'; Ilhan 88'	Report	Akhyar 66'; Safawi 90+3', 90+9' (pen.)	Stadium: BG Stadium; Referee: Ko Hyung-jin (South Korea)

== Statistics ==
=== Appearances and goals ===
No.	Pos	Nat	Player	Total		League		Malaysia FA Cup		Malaysia Cup		ASEAN Club Championship	
No.	Pos	Nat	Player	Apps	Goals	Apps	Goals	Apps	Goals	Apps	Goals	Apps	Goals
Goalkeepers
1	GK	(Malaysia) MAS	Rahadiazli Rahalim	14	0	6	0	0	0	5	0	3	0
29	GK	(Malaysia) MAS	Syed Nasrulhaq	16	0	10+1	0	4	0	1	0	0	0
38	GK	(Malaysia) MAS	Suhaimi Husin	11	0	8	0	1	0	0	0	2	0
82	GK	(Malaysia) MAS	Nazul Izamil	0	0	0	0	0	0	0	0	0	0
Defenders
3	DF	(Malaysia) MAS	Ubaidullah Shamsul	36	2	19+2	2	1+4	0	3+2	0	4+1	0
5	DF	(Malaysia) MAS	Shahrul Nizam	37	1	22	0	5	0	6	1	4	0
15	DF	(Malaysia) MAS	Faris Rifqi	9	0	5+2	0	0	0	0+2	0	0	0
20	DF	(Malaysia) MAS	Hairiey Hakim	7	0	0+4	0	0	0	0+2	0	0+1	0
23	DF	(Malaysia) MAS	Azam Azmi	34	1	18+2	0	4+1	0	4	1	5	0
24	DF	(Malaysia) MAS	Safwan Mazlan	37	2	19+3	2	5	0	6	0	3+1	0
25	DF	(Malaysia) MAS	Alif Zakaria	27	2	11+3	1	4	0	5+1	1	3	0
26	DF	(Montenegro) MNE	Argzim Redžović	4	0	1+1	0	0	0	0+2	0	0	0
51	DF	(Malaysia) MAS	Syafiq Danial	2	0	0+1	0	0	0	0+1	0	0	0
53	DF	(Malaysia) MAS	Zachary Zahidadil	1	0	0+1	0	0	0	0	0	0	0
56	DF	(Malaysia) MAS	Firdaus Rusdi	0	0	0	0	0	0	0	0	0	0
Midfielders
8	MF	(Philippines) PHI	Manny Ott	38	8	22	4	5	1	6	0	5	3
10	MF	(Uzbekistan) UZB	Nurillo Tukhtasinov	39	6	22+1	5	5	1	6	0	5	0
14	MF	(Malaysia) MAS	Akram Mahinan	32	0	11+9	0	0+3	0	4	0	4+1	0
18	MF	(Malaysia) MAS	Hakim Hassan	19	0	4+6	0	0+5	0	0+2	0	0+2	0
19	MF	(Malaysia) MAS	Syafik Ismail	6	0	0+6	0	0	0	0	0	0	0
21	MF	(Malaysia) MAS	Syaiful Haqim	1	0	0	0	0	0	0+1	0	0	0
46	MF	(Malaysia) MAS	Syahmi Zamri	25	0	2+12	0	0+2	0	0+5	0	0+4	0
50	MF	(Malaysia) MAS	Danial Nor	1	0	0+1	0	0	0	0	0	0	0
52	MF	(Malaysia) MAS	Amirul Syazwan	0	0	0	0	0	0	0	0	0	0
88	MF	(Malaysia) MAS	Nik Sharif Haseefy	24	2	2+12	1	0+2	0	0+3	0	0+5	1
Forwards
7	FW	(Croatia) CRO	Ivan Mamut	0	2	0	2	0	0	0	0	0	0
9	FW	(Nigeria) NGA	Ismahil Akinade	35	10	16+4	5	5	4	5+1	1	4	0
11	FW	(Malaysia) MAS	Safawi Rasid	36	18	21+1	7	5	3	4	3	5	5
22	FW	(Malaysia) MAS	Engku Shakir	36	0	5+16	0	0+5	0	3+3	0	1+3	0
33	FW	(Malaysia) MAS	Akhyar Rashid	38	10	18+4	2	5	1	5+1	3	5	4
80	FW	(Nigeria) NGA	Chukwu Chijioke	15	2	0+9	2	0+2	0	1	0	0+3	0
99	FW	(El Salvador) SLV	Nelson Bonilla	19	4	12+1	3	0	0	2+4	1	0	0
Players transferred/loaned out during the season
4	DF	(Netherlands) NED	Matthew Steenvoorden	8	0	3+1	0	1+1	0	0	0	1+1	0
60	MF	(Croatia) CRO	Marin Pilj	17	3	9+1	0	5	3	0	0	1+1	0

Last updated: 25 September 2025
Source: Competitions
