= 2022 FAS Tri-Nations Series squads =

Singapore Football Season

The 2022 FAS Tri-Nations Series was a three-team association football tournament held at the National Stadium in Kallang, Singapore, between 23 and 29 March 2022 for the men's competition and at Jalan Besar Stadium between 4 and 11 April for the women's competition.

The men's tournament was organized by the Football Association of Singapore in conjunction with the Football Association of Malaysia and the Philippine Football Federation as part of the three team's precursor for the third round of the 2023 AFC Asian Cup qualification matches. The three games in the tournament are authorized by FIFA as International “A” Matches.

For the women's competition, Singapore hosted Seychelles and Papua New Guinea as part of Singapore's preparations for the 31st Southeast Asian Games Games.

Below are the squads for the 2022 FAS Tri-Nations Series, which takes place between 23 and 29 March 2022.

== Men's team ==
=== Singapore ===
Head coach : (Singapore) Nazri Nasir

No.	Pos.	Player	Date of birth (age)	Caps	Goals	Club
1	GK	Izwan Mahbud	14 July 1990 (age 36)	54	0	(Football Association of Singapore) Lion City Sailors
12	GK	Zaiful Nizam	24 July 1987 (age 39)	3	0	(Football Association of Singapore) Geylang International
18	GK	Hassan Sunny	2 April 1984 (age 42)	94	0	(Football Association of Singapore) Lion City Sailors
30	GK	Syazwan Buhari	22 September 1992 (age 34)	0	0	(Football Association of Singapore) Tampines Rovers
2	DF	Zulqarnaen Suzliman	29 March 1998 (age 28)	21	0	(Football Association of Singapore) Young Lions
3	DF	Ryaan Sanizal	31 May 2002 (age 24)	0	0	(Football Association of Singapore) Tampines Rovers
4	DF	Nazrul Nazari	11 February 1991 (age 35)	50	0	(Football Association of Singapore) Hougang United
5	DF	Amirul Adli	13 January 1996 (age 30)	15	0	(Football Association of Singapore) Lion City Sailors
14	DF	Hariss Harun (captain)	19 November 1990 (age 35)	109	11	(Football Association of Singapore) Lion City Sailors
17	DF	Irfan Fandi	13 August 1997 (age 29)	38	1	(Football Association of Thailand) BG Pathum United
21	DF	Safuwan Baharudin	22 September 1991 (age 35)	105	13	(Football Association of Malaysia) Selangor
7	MF	Song Ui-young	8 November 1993 (age 32)	8	1	(Football Association of Singapore) Lion City Sailors
8	MF	Shahdan Sulaiman	9 May 1988 (age 38)	76	6	(Football Association of Singapore) Lion City Sailors
10	MF	Christopher van Huizen	28 November 1992 (age 33)	5	0	(Football Association of Singapore) Tampines Rovers
16	MF	Hami Syahin	16 December 1998 (age 27)	12	0	(Football Association of Singapore) Lion City Sailors
23	MF	Zulfahmi Arifin	5 October 1991 (age 34)	53	1	(Football Association of Singapore) Hougang United
27	MF	Adam Swandi	12 January 1996 (age 30)	13	1	(Football Association of Singapore) Lion City Sailors
29	MF	Shah Shahiran	14 November 1999 (age 26)	1	0	(Football Association of Singapore) Young Lions
9	FW	Ikhsan Fandi	9 April 1999 (age 27)	27	13	(Football Association of Thailand) BG Pathum United
11	FW	Hafiz Nor	22 August 1988 (age 38)	11	1	(Football Association of Singapore) Lion City Sailors
13	FW	Taufik Suparno	31 October 1995 (age 30)	2	0	(Football Association of Singapore) Tampines Rovers
19	FW	Ilhan Fandi	8 November 2002 (age 23)	3	0	(Football Association of Singapore) Young Lions
20	FW	Shawal Anuar	29 April 1991 (age 35)	20	2	(Football Association of Singapore) Hougang United
22	FW	Amy Recha	13 May 1992 (age 34)	7	0	(Football Association of Singapore) Hougang United

=== Malaysia ===
Head coach : (South Korea) Kim Pan-gon

No.	Pos.	Player	Date of birth (age)	Caps	Goals	Club
	GK	Farizal Marlias	29 June 1986 (age 40)	48	0	(Football Association of Malaysia) Johor Darul Ta'zim
	GK	Khairulazhan Khalid	7 November 1989 (age 36)	14	0	(Football Association of Malaysia) Selangor
	GK	Kalamullah Al-Hafiz	30 July 1995 (age 31)	0	0	(Football Association of Malaysia) Petaling Jaya City
	GK	Rahadiazli Rahalim	28 May 2001 (age 25)	0	0	(Football Association of Malaysia) Terengganu
	DF	Aidil Zafuan	3 August 1987 (age 39)	96	3	(Football Association of Malaysia) Johor Darul Ta'zim
	DF	Shahrul Saad	8 July 1993 (age 33)	43	5	(Football Association of Malaysia) Johor Darul Ta'zim
	DF	La'Vere Corbin-Ong	22 April 1991 (age 35)	13	1	(Football Association of Malaysia) Johor Darul Ta'zim
	DF	Dominic Tan	12 March 1997 (age 29)	7	0	(Football Association of Malaysia) Sabah
	DF	Khuzaimi Piee	11 November 1993 (age 32)	1	0	(Football Association of Malaysia) Negeri Sembilan
	DF	Khair Jones	29 September 1989 (age 36)	4	1	(Football Association of Malaysia) Negeri Sembilan
	DF	Dion Cools	4 June 1996 (age 30)	4	0	(Royal Belgian Football Association) Zulte Waregem
	DF	Quentin Cheng	20 November 1999 (age 26)	2	0	(Football Association of Malaysia) Selangor
	DF	Sharul Nazeem	16 November 1999 (age 26)	0	0	(Football Association of Malaysia) Selangor
	MF	Safiq Rahim	5 July 1987 (age 39)	75	15	(Football Association of Malaysia) Johor Darul Ta'zim
	MF	Syamer Kutty Abba	1 November 1997 (age 28)	22	0	(Football Association of Malaysia) Johor Darul Ta'zim
	MF	Nor Azam Azih	3 January 1995 (age 31)	16	0	(Football Association of Malaysia) Sri Pahang
	MF	Nazmi Faiz Mansor	16 August 1994 (age 32)	12	0	(Football Association of Malaysia) Johor Darul Ta'zim
	MF	Kogileswaran Raj	21 September 1998 (age 28)	6	2	(Football Association of Malaysia) Petaling Jaya City
	MF	Zhafri Yahya	25 September 1994 (age 31)	0	0	(Football Association of Malaysia) Kuala Lumpur City
	MF	Liridon Krasniqi	1 January 1992 (age 34)	4	0	(All India Football Federation) Odisha
	MF	Hong Wan	17 August 2000 (age 26)	0	0	(Football Association of Malaysia) Johor Darul Ta'zim
	FW	Arif Aiman Hanapi	4 May 2002 (age 24)	7	0	(Football Association of Malaysia) Johor Darul Ta'zim
	FW	Safawi Rasid	5 March 1997 (age 29)	35	15	(Football Association of Malaysia) Johor Darul Ta'zim
	FW	Akhyar Rashid	1 May 1999 (age 27)	28	5	(Football Association of Malaysia) Johor Darul Ta'zim
	FW	Faisal Halim	7 January 1998 (age 28)	4	0	(Football Association of Malaysia) Terengganu
	FW	Hakimi Abdullah	9 November 1999 (age 26)	2	0	(Football Association of Malaysia) Terengganu
	FW	Ramadhan Saifullah	9 December 2000 (age 25)	0	0	(Football Association of Malaysia) Johor Darul Ta'zim
	FW	Syafiq Ahmad	28 June 1995 (age 31)	27	8	(Football Association of Malaysia) Kedah Darul Aman
	FW	Mohamadou Sumareh	20 September 1994 (age 32)	22	6	(Football Association of Malaysia) Johor Darul Ta'zim
	FW	Luqman Hakim Shamsudin	5 March 2002 (age 24)	8	0	(Royal Belgian Football Association) Kortrijk

=== Philippines ===
Head coach : (England) Stewart Hall (Interim)

No.	Pos.	Player	Date of birth (age)	Caps	Goals	Club
	GK	Neil Etheridge	7 February 1990 (age 36)	65	0	(The Football Association) Birmingham City
	GK	Quincy Kammeraad	1 February 2001 (age 25)	0	0	(Philippine Football Federation) ADT
	GK	Kevin Ray Mendoza	29 September 1994 (age 31)	5	0	(Football Association of Malaysia) Kuala Lumpur City
	DF	Amani Aguinaldo	24 April 1995 (age 31)	42	0	(Football Association of Thailand) Nongbua Pitchaya
	DF	Justin Baas	16 March 2000 (age 26)	10	0	(Football Association of Malaysia) Melaka United
	DF	Diego Bardanca	20 March 1993 (age 33)	0	0	(Football Association of Thailand) Buriram United
	DF	Carli de Murga	30 November 1988 (age 37)	46	4	(Football Association of Malaysia) Johor Darul Ta'zim II
	DF	Enrique Linares	12 July 1999 (age 27)	0	0	(Royal Spanish Football Federation) San Pedro
	DF	Daisuke Sato	20 September 1994 (age 32)	53	3	(Football Association of Thailand) Ratchaburi Mitr Phol
	MF	Oliver Bias	15 June 2001 (age 25)	4	0	(Philippine Football Federation) ADT
	MF	Jesse Curran	26 July 1996 (age 30)	0	0	(Philippine Football Federation) Kaya-Iloilo
	MF	Dylan De Bruycker	5 December 1997 (age 28)	2	0	(Football Association of Thailand) Nakhon Ratchasima
	MF	Harry Föll	2 March 1998 (age 28)	0	0	(German Football Association) 08 Villingen
	MF	Kevin Ingreso	10 February 1993 (age 33)	33	4	(Football Association of Thailand) Samut Prakan City
	MF	Oskari Kekkonen	24 September 1999 (age 27)	3	0	(Philippine Football Federation) Kaya-Iloilo
	MF	Manny Ott	6 May 1992 (age 34)	52	4	(Football Association of Malaysia) Terengganu
	MF	Iain Ramsay	27 February 1988 (age 38)	35	5	(Football Association of Thailand) Nongbua Pitchaya
	MF	Stephan Schröck (captain)	21 August 1986 (age 40)	50	6	Unattached
	MF	John-Patrick Strauß	28 January 1996 (age 30)	12	2	(German Football Association) Erzgebirge Aue
	MF	Dennis Villanueva	28 April 1992 (age 34)	14	0	(Football Association of Thailand) Nakhon Ratchasima
	FW	Mark Hartmann	20 January 1992 (age 34)	29	8	(Philippine Football Federation) United City
	FW	Gerrit Holtmann	25 March 1995 (age 31)	0	0	(German Football Association) VfL Bochum
	FW	Bienvenido Marañón	15 May 1986 (age 40)	4	4	(Football Association of Malaysia) Johor Darul Ta'zim
	FW	OJ Porteria	9 May 1994 (age 32)	22	2	(Football Federation of Cambodia) Kirivong Sok Sen Chey
	FW	Patrick Reichelt	5 June 1988 (age 38)	68	12	(Football Association of Thailand) PT Prachuap

== Statistics ==
=== Player representation by league system ===
Leagues	Players	Outside national squad
Malaysia Super League	33	6
Singapore Premier League	23	0
(Thailand) Thai League 1	10	10
Philippines Football League	5	0
(Belgium) Jupiler Pro League	2	2
(Cambodia) Cambodian Premier League	1	1
(England) EFL Championship	1	1
(Germany) Bundesliga	1	1
(Germany) 2. Bundesliga	1	1
(Germany) Oberliga	1	1
(India) Indian Super League	1	1
(Spain) Tercera División	1	1
Unattached	1	1

=== Player representation by club ===
Clubs with 2 or more players represented are listed.

Club	Players
(Malaysia) Johor Darul Ta'zim	15
(Singapore) Lion City Sailors	11
(Malaysia) Selangor	4
(Singapore) Tampines Rovers	4
(Malaysia) Terengganu	4
(Singapore) Hougang United	4
(Singapore) Young Lions	3
(Philippines) Kaya–Iloilo	2
(Malaysia) Negeri Sembilan	2
(Thailand) BG Pathum United	2
(Thailand) Nongbua Pitchaya	2
(Malaysia) Petaling Jaya City	2
(Philippines) Azkals Development Team	2
(Malaysia) Kuala Lumpur City	2
(Thailand) Nakhon Ratchasima	2

=== Player representation by club confederation ===
Confederation	Players
AFC	73
UEFA	7
Unattached	1
