= 2026–27 Negeri Sembilan FC season =

Negeri Sembilan
2026–27 season
- Chairman: YAB Dato' Haji Ismail Lasim
- CEO: Faliq Firdaus
- Head coach: Daniel Giménez
- Stadium: Tuanku Abdul Rahman Stadium
- Malaysia Super League: 5th
- Malaysia FA Cup: Round of 16
- Malaysia Cup: TBD
- Top goalscorer: League: Akhyar Rashid (2 goals); All: Akhyar Rashid (3 goals)
- Highest home attendance: 1,978 vs Star City; 5 September 2026
- Lowest home attendance: 999 vs Kelantan City; 8 September 2026
Home colours	Away colours

The 2026–27 season is Negeri Sembilan's 103rd year in their history and the 14th season in the Malaysia Super League. It is also their fifth season in the Malaysia Super League since being promoted from the Malaysia Premier League in the 2021. The club also competed in the Malaysia Cup and Malaysia FA Cup.

== Events ==
For the first time, Negeri Sembilan held the NSFC Player Awards (APNSFC) for 2025–26 season to recognise and honour the club's top-performing players and individuals for their achievements throughout the season. The awards comprised Best Player, Best Young Player, Best Goal, Best Assist, Unsung Hero and Fans' Award.

On 26 June 2026, Negeri Sembilan announced the appointment of Daniel Giménez Alcañiz as the club's new head coach for the 2026–27 season, replacing interim head coach Rajan Koran.

On 31 July 2026, Aminuddin Harun resigned as chairman of Negeri Sembilan FC after serving in the position since June 2025. His resignation was accepted by the club, with Tunku Syed Razman Tunku Syed Idrus Al-Qadri appointed as acting chairman.

On 14 August 2026, YAB Dato' Haji Ismail Lasim was appointed as the new chairman of Negeri Sembilan FC, succeeding YAB Dato' Seri Utama Haji Aminuddin Harun.

== Players ==
=== First-team squad ===
As of 14 October 2026

Note: Flags indicate national team as defined under FIFA eligibility rules; some limited exceptions apply. Players may hold more than one non-FIFA nationality.

No.	Pos.	Nation	Player
1	GK	MAS	Syahmi Adib Haikal
2	DF	MAS	Raimi Shamsul
3	DF	SGP	Ryaan Sanizal
4	DF	KOR	Park Yi-young
5	DF	JPN	Kei Oshiro
6	MF	MAS	Wan Kuzri
7	MF	JPN	Takumi Sasaki
8	MF	MYA	Wai Lin Aung
9	FW	BIH	Jovan Motika
10	FW	MAS	Luqman Hakim
11	FW	MTN	Aboubakar Kamara
12	MF	MAS	Afiq Fitri
13	FW	JPN	Yusuke Minagawa
14	MF	MAS	Akram Mahinan
16	FW	MAS	Rahman Daud

No.	Pos.	Nation	Player
17	MF	MAS	Alif Mutalib
18	DF	MAS	Khuzaimi Piee (Captain)
19	FW	MAS	N. Javabilaarivin
20	MF	JPN	Mio Tsuneyasu
21	MF	MAS	Haiqal Haqeemi
22	GK	MAS	Aqil Razak
23	DF	MGL	Filip Andersen
24	MF	JPN	Yuichi Hirano
26	DF	MAS	Hairiey Hakim
27	DF	MAS	Zainal Abidin Jamil
28	DF	MAS	Ariff Ar-Rasyid
30	GK	MAS	Azri Ghani
32	FW	MAS	Akhyar Rashid (on loan from Terengganu)
33	MF	MAS	Umar Hakeem

=== Reserve team and Youth Academy ===
Note: Flags indicate national team as defined under FIFA eligibility rules; some limited exceptions apply. Players may hold more than one non-FIFA nationality.

No.	Pos.	Nation	Player
34	MF	MAS	Adam Haikal Azizol
35	FW	MAS	Izrin Ibrahim
57	FW	ENG	Anuar Ceesay

=== Out on loan ===
Note: Flags indicate national team as defined under FIFA eligibility rules; some limited exceptions apply. Players may hold more than one non-FIFA nationality.

No.	Pos.	Nation	Player

== Management and technical staff ==
=== Management ===
As of 14 August 2026

Position	Staff
Chairman	(Malaysia) YAB Dato' Haji Ismail Lasim
Advisory board	(Malaysia) YB Dato' Mohd Zafir Ibrahim
Advisory board	(Malaysia) YB Dato’ Hj Mohd Khidir Bin Majid
Advisory board	(Malaysia) YB Dato' Hj Mustapha Nagoor
Advisory board	(Malaysia) YBhg Dato' Masri Haji Razali
Director	(Malaysia) Abd Razak Mohd Idrus
Chief executive officer	(Malaysia) Faliq Firdaus
Chief operating officer	(Malaysia) Firdaus Bhari
Technical director	(Malaysia) Efendi Abdul Malek
Team admin & special project	(Malaysia) Muhammad Zulkhairi Shamsudin
Finance & HR	(Malaysia) Rizal Jaafar
Media	(Malaysia) Ahmad Maaroff Baharuddin
Team manager	(Malaysia) Abd Razak Mohd Idrus
Assistant manager	(Malaysia) Hamdan Othman

=== Technical staff ===
As of 23 August 2026

Position	Staff
Head coach	(Spain) Daniel Giménez
Assistant head coach	(Malaysia) Rajan Koran
Assistant head coach	(Malaysia) Khairul Ismail
Assistant coach	(Malaysia) Irfan Fadzil Idrus
Goalkeeper coach	(Malaysia) Megat Amir Faisal
Fitness coach	(Malaysia) Khairal Afiq Jamal Abd Haziq
Team analyst	(Malaysia) Aiman Danial Mat Aris
Team doctor	(Malaysia) Dr. Rozaiman Ebrahim
Physiotherapist	(Malaysia) Syaiful Sabtu
Physiotherapist	(Malaysia) Ahmad Faisal Miswan
Team coordinator	(Malaysia) Azri Raffi
Security officer	(Malaysia) Sohaimi Hasim
Masseur	(Lebanon) Mahmoud El Hajj
Masseur	(Malaysia) Zahari Mazlan
Kitman	(Malaysia) Jefri Jaafar
Kitman	(Malaysia) Sharizal Mat Sah

== Transfers ==
=== In ===
Date	Pos.	Name	From	Fee	Ref.
1 June 2026	MF	(United States) Wan Kuzri	(Malaysia) UM-Damansara	Loan return	
1 June 2026	FW	(Malaysia) Zaim Iqbal	(Malaysia) Kelantan Red Warrior	Loan return	
1 June 2026	DF	(Malaysia) Hariz Kamarudin	(Malaysia) Bunga Raya	Loan return	
1 June 2026	DF	(Malaysia) S. Vimal Nair	(Malaysia) Bunga Raya	Loan return	
1 June 2026	MF	(Malaysia) T. Harish	(Malaysia) Bunga Raya	Loan return	
1 June 2026	MF	(Malaysia) Noor Adha Zailani	(Malaysia) Armed Forces	Loan return	
1 June 2026	DF	(Malaysia) Noor Aidil Zailani	(Malaysia) Armed Forces	Loan return	
1 July 2026	FW	(Japan) Mio Tsuneyasu	(Japan) Gainare Tottori	Free (Note: He was signed on a permanent deal after spending a year on loan from Gainare Tottori in the 2025–26 season.)	
5 July 2026	MF	(Malaysia) Alif Mutalib	(Malaysia) Johor Darul Ta'zim II	Free	
6 July 2026	FW	(Malaysia) Rahman Daud	(Malaysia) Selangor II	Free	
7 July 2026	MF	(Malaysia) Umar Hakeem	(Malaysia) Johor Darul Ta'zim II	Free	
8 July 2026	DF	(Malaysia) Hairiey Hakim	(Malaysia) Terengganu	Free	
8 July 2026	DF	(Malaysia) Raimi Shamsul	(Malaysia) Selangor	Free	
8 July 2026	DF	(Singapore) Ryaan Sanizal	(Singapore) Hougang United	Free	
14 July 2026	MF	(Malaysia) Akram Mahinan	(Malaysia) Terengganu	Free	
14 July 2026	DF	(South Korea) Park Yi-young	(Cambodia) Phnom Penh Crown	Free	
16 August 2026	FW	(Japan) Yusuke Minagawa	(Cambodia) Nagaworld FC	Free	
14 October 2026	FW	(Mauritania) Aboubakar Kamara	Unattached (Note: Most recently played for Kanchanaburi Power)	Free	
Transferred in mid-season

=== Out ===
Date	Pos.	Name	To	Fee	Ref.
31 May 2026	DF	(Singapore) Amirul Adli	(Singapore) Tampines Rovers	Loan return	
1 July 2026	MF	(South Korea) An Sang-su	Unattached	Released	
1 July 2026	DF	(Malaysia) Azrin Afiq	Unattached	Released	
1 July 2026	FW	(Malaysia) Zaim Iqbal	Unattached	Released	
1 July 2026	DF	(Equatorial Guinea) Luis Enrique Nsue	(Kuwait) Al-Jazeera	Released	
1 July 2026	MF	(Malaysia) Zahril Azri	(Malaysia) Melaka FC	Released	
1 July 2026	DF	(Malaysia) Noor Aidil Zailani	(Malaysia) Armed Forces	Released	
1 July 2026	MF	(Malaysia) Noor Adha Zailani	(Malaysia) Armed Forces	Released	
1 July 2026	MF	(Malaysia) S. Vimal Nair	(Malaysia) Manjung City	Released	
1 July 2026	MF	(Malaysia) T. Harish	(Malaysia) Bunga Raya	Released	
1 July 2026	DF	(Malaysia) Hariz Kamarudin	(Malaysia) Immigration II	Released	
1 July 2026	MF	(Palestine) Oday Kharoub	(Jordan) Al-Baqa'a	Released	
1 July 2026	FW	(Ghana) Joseph Esso	(Iraq) Ghaz Al-Shamal	Released	
1 July 2026	DF	(Malaysia) Harith Samsuri	(Malaysia) Star City	Released	
1 July 2026	DF	(Malaysia) Anwar Ibrahim	(Malaysia) Star City	Released	
1 July 2026	FW	(Malaysia) Hadin Azman	(Malaysia) Kelantan City	Released	
1 July 2026	MF	(Malaysia) A. Selvan	(Malaysia) Selangor	Released	
3 September 2026	FW	(Malaysia) Hakimi Abdullah	(Malaysia) Kelantan City	Free	
Transferred out mid-season

=== Loan in ===
Date	Pos.	Name	From	Fee	Ref.
17 July 2026	FW	(Malaysia) Akhyar Rashid	(Malaysia) Terengganu	Free loan	
Loaned in mid-season

=== Loan out ===
Date	Pos.	Name	To	Until	Ref.
—	—	TBD	TBD	—	
Loaned out mid-season

== New contracts ==
Notes: All contracts were announced on NSFC's official social media.
No	Pos	Names	Date	Until	Ref
Contract extensions
5	DF	(Japan) Kei Oshiro	1 July 2026	30 June 2028	
7	MF	(Japan) Takumi Sasaki	2 July 2026	30 June 2028	
24	MF	(Japan) Yūichi Hirano	2 July 2026	30 June 2027	
9	FW	(Bosnia and Herzegovina) Jovan Motika	3 July 2026	30 June 2028	
8	MF	(Myanmar) Wai Linn Aung	4 July 2026	30 June 2027	
28	DF	(Malaysia) Ariff Ar-Rasyid	15 July 2026	30 June 2028	
New signings
16	FW	(Malaysia) Rahman Daud	6 July 2026	30 June 2029	
26	DF	(Malaysia) Hairiey Hakim	8 July 2026	30 June 2028	

== Competitions ==
=== Overview ===
Competition	First match	Last match	Starting round	Final position	Record							
Competition	First match	Last match	Starting round	Final position	Pld	W	D	L	GF	GA	GD	Win %
Malaysia Super League	30 August 2026		Matchday 1		7	1	2	4	8	13	−5	14.29
Malaysia FA Cup	2 September 2026	8 September 2026	Round of 16	Round of 16	2	1	0	1	3	4	−1	50.00
Malaysia Cup					0	0	0	0	0	0	+0	—
Total					9	2	2	5	11	17	−6	22.22

Last updated: 20 November 2026
Source: Competitions

=== Malaysia Super League ===
==== League table ====
Pos	Team	Pld	W	D	L	GF	GA	GD	Pts	Qualification or relegation
1	Johor Darul Ta'zim	6	6	0	0	28	0	+28	18	Qualification for the AFC Champions League Elite league stage
2	Selangor	6	6	0	0	17	4	+13	18	Qualification for the AFC Champions League Two group stage
3	Kuching City	7	5	0	2	19	7	+12	15	
4	DPMM (Note: DPMM cannot qualify for Asian Football Confederation competitions as they are based in Brunei.)	6	4	0	2	9	8	+1	12	
5	Sabah	6	3	1	2	9	6	+3	10	
6	Melaka	6	3	0	3	10	12	−2	9	
7	Kuala Lumpur City (Note: Negeri Sembilan were awarded a 3–0 win and three points after KL City were found to have failed to register enough players.)	6	2	0	4	6	16	−10	6	
8	Negeri Sembilan	7	1	2	4	8	13	−5	5	
9	Terengganu	6	1	2	3	4	9	−5	5	
10	Star City	6	1	2	3	9	16	−7	5	
11	Penang	6	1	1	4	5	10	−5	4	
12	Kelantan Red Warrior	6	0	0	6	6	29	−23	0	

Updated to match(es) played on 20 November 2026. Source: Malaysian Football League
Rules for classification: 1) Points; 2) Goal difference; 3) Number of goals scored.

==== Results by round ====
Round	1	2	3	4	5	6	7	8	9	10	11	12	13	14	15	16	17	18	19	20	21	22	23	24	25	26
Ground																										
Result																										
Position																										

Updated to match(es) played on 13 May 2025. Source: 2026–27 MSL
A = Away; H = Home; W = Win; D = Draw; L = Loss; C = Cancelled

== Squad statistics ==
=== Appearances and goals ===
As of 26 May 2026

No.	Pos.	Name	League		Malaysia FA Cup		Malaysia Cup		Total		Discipline	
No.	Pos.	Name	Apps	Goals	Apps	Goals	Apps	Goals	Apps	Goals	Yellow card	Red card
1	GK	(Malaysia) Syahmi Adib Haikal	0	0	0	0	0	0	0	0	0	0
2	DF	(Malaysia) Raimi Shamsul	0	0	0	0	0	0	0	0	0	0
3	DF	(Singapore) Ryaan Sanizal	0	0	0	0	0	0	0	0	0	0
4	DF	(South Korea) Park Yi-young	0	0	0	0	0	0	0	0	0	0
5	DF	(Japan) Kei Oshiro	0	0	0	0	0	0	0	0	0	0
6	MF	(Malaysia) Wan Kuzri	0	0	0	0	0	0	0	0	0	0
7	MF	(Japan) Takumi Sasaki	0	0	0	0	0	0	0	0	0	0
8	MF	(Myanmar) Wai Linn Aung	0	0	0	0	0	0	0	0	0	0
9	FW	(Bosnia and Herzegovina) Jovan Motika	0	0	0	0	0	0	0	0	0	0
10	FW	(Malaysia) Luqman Hakim	0	0	0	0	0	0	0	0	0	0
11	FW	(Mauritania) Aboubakar Kamara	0	0	0	0	0	0	0	0	0	0
12	MF	(Malaysia) Afiq Fitri	0	0	0	0	0	0	0	0	0	0
13	FW	(Japan) Yusuke Minagawa	0	0	0	0	0	0	0	0	0	0
14	MF	(Malaysia) Akram Mahinan	0	0	0	0	0	0	0	0	0	0
16	FW	(Malaysia) Rahman Daud	0	0	0	0	0	0	0	0	0	0
17	MF	(Malaysia) Alif Mutalib	0	0	0	0	0	0	0	0	0	0
18	DF	(Malaysia) Khuzaimi Piee	0	0	0	0	0	0	0	0	0	0
19	FW	(Malaysia) N. Javabilaarivin	0	0	0	0	0	0	0	0	0	0
20	MF	(Japan) Mio Tsuneyasu	0	0	0	0	0	0	0	0	0	0
21	MF	(Malaysia) Haiqal Haqeemi	0	0	0	0	0	0	0	0	0	0
22	GK	(Malaysia) Aqil Razak	0	0	0	0	0	0	0	0	0	0
23	DF	(Mongolia) Filip Andersen	0	0	0	0	0	0	0	0	0	0
24	MF	(Japan) Yuichi Hirano	0	0	0	0	0	0	0	0	0	0
26	DF	(Malaysia) Hairiey Hakim	0	0	0	0	0	0	0	0	0	0
27	DF	(Malaysia) Zainal Abidin Jamil	0	0	0	0	0	0	0	0	0	0
28	DF	(Malaysia) Ariff Ar-Rasyid	0	0	0	0	0	0	0	0	0	0
30	GK	(Malaysia) Azri Ghani	0	0	0	0	0	0	0	0	0	0
32	FW	(Malaysia) Akhyar Rashid	0	0	0	0	0	0	0	0	0	0
33	MF	(Malaysia) Umar Hakeem	0	0	0	0	0	0	0	0	0	0
Players transferred out during the season

=== Goalscorers ===
As of 5 September 2026

Rank	No.	Pos.	Name	League	Malaysia FA Cup	Malaysia Cup	Total
1	32	FW	Akhyar Rashid	2	1	0	3
2	13	FW	Yusuke Minagawa	1	1	0	2
3	4	DF	Park Yi-young	0	1	0	1
Totals				3	3	0	6

=== Assists ===
As of 5 September 2026

Rank	No.	Pos.	Name	League	Malaysia FA Cup	Malaysia Cup	Total
1	20	MF	Mio Tsuneyasu	1	0	0	1
1	16	FW	Rahman Daud	1	0	0	1
1	24	MF	Yūichi Hirano	1	0	0	1
1	26	DF	Hairiey Hakim	0	1	0	1
1	9	FW	Jovan Motika	0	1	0	1
Totals				3	2	0	5

=== Clean sheets ===
As of 26 May 2026

Rank	No.	Pos.	Name	League	Malaysia FA Cup	Malaysia Cup	Total
1	–	–	TBD	0	0	0	0
Totals				0	0	0	0

== Foreign players ==
Since the 2025–26 Malaysia Super League season, the Malaysian Football League (MFL) introduced a revised foreign player quota. Each team is allowed to register up to 15 foreign players, but only six can be used in a matchday squad. This includes four world (open) category players, one from an AFC (Asia) member country, and one from an ASEAN (Southeast Asia) country, with an additional three foreign player allowed on the bench.

=== List of foreign players ===
List of NSFC foreign players for 2026–27 season;

Year	Name	Nat	Age	Position	From	Fee	Quota
2025–present	Jovan Motika	(Bosnia and Herzegovina)	27	LW/RW/SS	Kuala Lumpur City	Free	World
2026–present	Anuar Ceesay	(England)	23	LM/RM/AM	UM-Damansara	Free	World
2026–present	Aboubakar Kamara	(Mauritania)	31	FW/LW/RW	Unattached	Free	World
2024–present	Takumi Sasaki	(Japan)	28	AM/CM/LW	Ehime FC	Free	Asia (Note: Asian players can also be registered under the International/World quota)
2025–present	Mio Tsuneyasu	(Japan)	24	RW/LW/AM	Gainare Tottori	Free	Asia
2025–present	Filip Andersen	(Mongolia)	23	CB/LB	Loyola	Free	Asia
2026–present	Kei Oshiro	(Japan)	25	CB/DM	Gainare Tottori	Free	Asia
2026–present	Yuichi Hirano	(Japan)	30	CM/DM	Cerezo Osaka	Free	Asia
2026–present	Yusuke Minagawa	(Japan)	34	FW	Nagaworld	Free	Asia
2026–present	Park Yi-young	(South Korea)	32	CB/RB/DM	Phnom Penh Crown	Free	Asia
2025–present	Wai Linn Aung	(Myanmar)	26	DM/CM	Yangon United	Free	ASEAN
2026–present	Ryaan Sanizal	(Singapore)	24	CB/RB/LB	Hougang United	Free	ASEAN

== Development squads and transfers ==
=== NSFC II squad ===
As of 5 September 2026

Note: Flags indicate national team as defined under FIFA eligibility rules; some limited exceptions apply. Players may hold more than one non-FIFA nationality.

No.	Pos.	Nation	Player
2	DF	MAS	Raimi Shamsul
23	DF	MGL	Filip Andersen
34	MF	MAS	Adam Haikal Azizol^{U22} (captain)
35	FW	MAS	Izrin Ibrahim^{U22}
36	FW	MAS	Danish Khalishah^{U22}
37	DF	MAS	Zuryhakim Zafran^{U22}
38	MF	MAS	Irfan Zakwan^{U22}
39	FW	MAS	J. Kishen^{U22}
40	GK	MAS	Fareez Safwan^{U22}
41	DF	MAS	Syed Zaris Irfan
42	MF	MAS	Adam Haris Hamizon^{U22}
43	DF	MAS	Denish Naufal^{U22}
44	DF	GER	Andreas Heimerl
45	MF	MAS	Hakim Hafie^{U22}

No.	Pos.	Nation	Player
46	DF	MAS	Hadif Sidry^{U22}
47	FW	MAS	Airiel Zafran^{U22}
48	MF	MAS	V. Kartikeyan^{U22}
49	FW	MAS	Muhaimin Nor Azri^{U22}
50	GK	MAS	Afiq Hazim^{U22}
51	MF	MAS	Aqil Faris^{U22}
52	DF	MAS	Haiqal Danish^{U22}
53	FW	MAS	Afiq Izzudin^{U22}
54	MF	MAS	Asyraaf Anwar Jufrizal^{U22}
56	DF	MAS	Afif Imran^{U22}
57	FW	ENG	Anuar Ceesay
58	DF	MAS	Adam Baqishah^{U22}
59	DF	MAS	Fahrien Haiqal^{U22}
60	GK	MAS	Daris Irfan^{U22}

=== NSFC II transfers ===
==== In ====
Date	Pos.	Name	From	Fee	Ref.
July 2026	FW	Anuar Ceesay	Negeri Sembilan	Moved	
July 2026	DF	Haiqal Danish	Negeri Sembilan	Moved	
July 2026	DF	Syed Zaris Irfan	Negeri Sembilan	Moved	
July 2026	GK	Fareez Safwan	NSFC U-20	Promoted	
July 2026	GK	Afiq Hazim	NSFC U-20	Promoted	
July 2026	DF	Adam Baqishah	NSFC U-20	Promoted	
July 2026	DF	Afif Imran	NSFC U-20	Promoted	
July 2026	DF	Denish Naufal	NSFC U-20	Promoted	
July 2026	DF	Fahrien Haiqal	NSFC U-20	Promoted	
July 2026	DF	Zuryhakim Zafran	NSFC U-20	Promoted	
July 2026	MF	Aqil Faris	NSFC U-20	Promoted	
July 2026	MF	Asyraaf Anwar Jufrizal	NSFC U-20	Promoted	
July 2026	MF	V. Kartikeyan	NSFC U-20	Promoted	
July 2026	MF	Adam Haris Hamizon	NSFC U-20	Promoted	
July 2026	FW	Airiel Zafran	NSFC U-20	Promoted	
July 2026	FW	Muhaimin Nor Azri	NSFC U-20	Promoted	
July 2026	FW	Danish Khalishah	NSFC U-20	Promoted	
July 2026	DF	Andreas Heimerl	Étoile Carouge FC II	Free	
July 2026	MF	Irfan Zakwan	Selangor U-20	Free	
July 2026	MF	Adam Haikal Azizol	Selangor U-20	Free	
July 2026	MF	Izrin Ibrahim	Selangor U-20	Free	
July 2026	DF	Hadif Sidry	Johor Darul Ta'zim IV	Free	
July 2026	MF	Hakim Hafie	Johor Darul Ta'zim IV	Free	
July 2026	FW	Afiq Izzudin	Johor Darul Ta'zim IV	Free	
July 2026	GK	Daris Irfan	KL City U-20	Free	
July 2026	FW	J. Kishen	Melaka FA U-20	Free	

=== NSFC III squad ===
Currently plays in the President Cup tournament for 2025–26.

As of 5 June 2026

No	Pos	Nat	Names	D.O.B	Age
62	DF	(Malaysia)	Muhammad Darwish Iqram Bin Abdul Rahim	06.10.2007	19
63	DF	(Malaysia)	Muhammad Khamil Bin Adenan	16.10.2008	18
64	FW	(Malaysia)	Muhammad Bilal Benyamin Bin Mat Sakri	06.10.2008	18
65	MF	(Malaysia)	Ahmad Aqil Rayyan Bin Ahmad Faizal	01.05.2008	18
66	DF	(Malaysia)	Muhammad Danial Zulkarnain Bin Mohamad Shahrulnizam	06.11.2008	18
67	MF	(Malaysia)	Aswan Bin Adi	13.12.2007	19
68	DF	(Malaysia)	Afiq Zimam Bin Shahril Izzuddin	01.07.2008	18
69	MF	(Malaysia)	Muhammad Afiq Haikal Bin Mohd Al Hafiz	25.09.2007	19
70	DF	(Malaysia)	Muhammad Iman Thaqif Bin Mohd Nazri	11.09.2007	19
71	GK	(Malaysia)	Muhammad Danial Haikal Bin Khairul Anuar	23.01.2008	18
72	MF	(Malaysia)	Adhwa' Irsyad Bin Mohamed Som	14.05.2008	18
73	DF	(Malaysia)	Muhammad Azri Hanif Bin Noor	19.11.2007	19
74	DF	(Malaysia)	Muhammad Aidil Afdhal Bin Abd Latif	12.01.2008	18
75	FW	(Malaysia)	Ahmad Akil Danial Bin Ahmad Johari	10.08.2008	18
76	DF	(Malaysia)	Muhammad Izzat Nadzir Bin Mohd Nazri	28.05.2008	18
77	FW	(Malaysia)	Muhammad Amirul Hazmi Bin Muhammad Ikram	29.01.2008	18
78	DF	(Malaysia)	Mohamad Aiman Asyraf Bin Sharul Azhar	30.12.2008	18
79	FW	(Malaysia)	Farish Haiqal Bin Rosman	26.03.2007	19
80	FW	(Malaysia)	Muhammad Wassem Rifqi Bin Zulkiflee	15.09.2008	18
81	GK	(Malaysia)	Muhammad Adam Mikhail B Mhd Saffiyan	25.03.2008	18
82	MF	(Malaysia)	Mohammad Khairul Akhmal Bin Khairul Sharizal	27.07.2008	18
83	DF	(Malaysia)	Muhammad Zuryharith Bin Mohd Zafran	04.12.2008	18
84	DF	(Malaysia)	Mohamad Faris Ikmal Bin Mohamad Rahmat	19.02.2008	18
85	DF	(Malaysia)	Muhamad Ammar Yusuf Bin Mohd Faizul	10.05.2008	18
86	DF	(Malaysia)	Aidil Haziq Bin Ahmad Marzuki	13.01.2008	18
87	DF	(Malaysia)	Nazmi Idham Bin Nasir	10.03.2008	18
88	MF	(Malaysia)	Muhammad Mikail Darwis Bin Nor Azuan	18.03.2008	18
89	MF	(Malaysia)	Muhammad Yusof Rayyan Bin Mohd Salleh	03.07.2008	18
90	FW	(Malaysia)	Afif Ikhwan Bin Nor Affendy	16.03.2008	18
91	GK	(Malaysia)	Zikry Faris Bin Zulkifli	03.12.2008	18
92	DF	(Malaysia)	Muhammad Faiz Bin Marzuki	11.01.2008	18

=== NSFC III transfers ===
==== In ====
Date	Pos.	Name	From	Fee	Ref.
January 2026	DF	Darwish Iqram	NSFC U18	Promoted	
January 2026	MF	Aswan Adi	NSFC U18	Promoted	
January 2026	MF	Afiq Haikal Al Hafiz	NSFC U18	Promoted	
January 2026	DF	Iman Thaqif	NSFC U18	Promoted	
January 2026	DF	Azri Hanif	NSFC U18	Promoted	
January 2026	FW	Farish Haiqal	NSFC U18	Promoted	
January 2026	FW	Ahmad Akil Danial	SMK Za'ba	Promoted	
January 2026	DF	Izzat Nadzir	SMK Za'ba	Promoted	
January 2026	FW	Amirul Hazmi	SMK Za'ba	Promoted	
January 2026	DF	Aiman Asyraf Sharul Azhar	SMK Za'ba	Promoted	
January 2026	FW	Wassem Rifqi	SMK Za'ba	Promoted	
January 2026	GK	Adam Mikhail	SMK Za'ba	Promoted	
January 2026	MF	Khairul Akhmal	SMK Za'ba	Promoted	
January 2026	FW	Bilal Benyamin	AMD U17	Free	
January 2026	MF	Aqil Rayyan Faizal	AMD U17	Free	
January 2026	GK	Danial Haikal	AMD U17	Free	
January 2026	MF	Adhwa' Irsyad	AMD U17	Free	
January 2026	DF	Danial Zulkarnain	AMD Future	Free	
January 2026	DF	Afiq Zimam	SSTMI	Free	
January 2026	DF	Nazmi Idham	SMK Putrajaya Presint 14(1)	Free	
January 2026	MF	Mikail Darwis	SMK Putrajaya Presint 14(1)	Free	
January 2026	MF	Yusof Rayyan	SMK Putrajaya Presint 14(1)	Free	
January 2026	GK	Zikry Faris	SMK Putrajaya Presint 14(1)	Free	
January 2026	FW	Afif Ikhwan	SMK Gunung Rapat	Free	
January 2026	DF	Khamil Adenan	Victoria Institution	Free	
January 2026	DF	Aidil Haziq	Victoria Institution	Free	
January 2026	DF	Aidil Afdhal	SMK Datuk Haji Abdul Samad	Free	
January 2026	DF	Zuryharith Zafran	SMK Tunku Ampuan Durah	Free	
January 2026	DF	Faiz Marzuki	SMK Pasir Besar	Free	
January 2026	DF	Ammar Yusuf	SMK Desa Chempaka	Free	
January 2026	GK	Faris Ikmal Rahmat	SMK Saujana Utama	Free	
