= Hairiey Hakim =

Malaysian footballer

Personal information
- Full name: Muhammad Hairiey Hakim bin Mamat
- Date of birth: 14 January 2000 (age 26)
- Place of birth: Kuala Terengganu, Malaysia
- Height: 1.70 m (5 ft 7 in)
- Position: Left-back

Team information
- Current team: Negeri Sembilan
- Number: 26

Youth career
- 2018–2019: Terengganu IV

Senior career*
Years	Team	Apps	(Gls)
2020–2026	Terengganu	27	(0)
2021–2022	→ Terengganu II (loan)	20	(0)
2026–	Negeri Sembilan	0	(0)

International career^{‡}
2021–2022	Malaysia U22	10	(0)
- * Club domestic league appearances and goals as of 7 July 2026 ‡ National team caps and goals as of 7 July 2026

Muhammad Hairiey Hakim bin Mamat (born 14 January 2000) is a Malaysian professional footballer who plays as a left-back for Malaysia Super League club Negeri Sembilan.

== Club career ==
=== Youth career ===
Hairiey Hakim began his football career with SSN Terengganu at SMK Bukit Nenas, where he played until 2017. In the same year, he represented the Terengganu MSSM team at the MSSM Under-18 Football Championship. In 2018, he joined Terengganu FC IV to compete in the Piala Belia until 2019.

=== Terengganu ===
In 2020, Hairiey was promoted to the Terengganu first team. He made his senior debut on 29 February 2020 against Perak, coming on as an 80th-minute substitute for Arif Fadzilah.

On 8 January 2025, Hairiey made his debut in Asian club competition in the ASEAN Club Championship against Shan United at Thuwunna Stadium. He came on as an 81st-minute substitute for Safwan Mazlan as Terengganu recorded a 5–0 victory.

=== Negeri Sembilan ===
On 8 July 2026, Negeri Sembilan announced the signing of Hairiey on a two-year contract ahead of the 2026–27 season.

== Career statistics ==
=== Club ===
As of 7 July 2026

Club	Season	League			Cup		League Cup		Continental		Total	
Club	Season	Division	Apps	Goals	Apps	Goals	Apps	Goals	Apps	Goals	Apps	Goals
Terengganu	2020	Malaysia Super League	2	0	0	0	0	0	—		2	0
Terengganu	2021	Malaysia Super League	3	0	0	0	2	0	—		5	0
Terengganu	2022	Malaysia Super League	6	0	2	0	0	0	—		8	0
Terengganu	2023	Malaysia Super League	5	0	0	0	0	0	0	0	5	0
Terengganu	2024–25	Malaysia Super League	4	0	0	0	2	0	1	0	7	0
Terengganu	2025–26	Malaysia Super League	7	0	0	0	1	0	—		8	0
Terengganu	Total		27	0	2	0	5	0	1	0	35	0
Terengganu II (loan)	2021	Malaysia Premier League	15	0	0	0	0	0	—		15	0
Terengganu II (loan)	2022	Malaysia Premier League	5	0	0	0	0	0	—		5	0
Terengganu II (loan)	Total		20	0	0	0	0	0	0	0	20	0
Negeri Sembilan	2026–27	Malaysia Super League	0	0	0	0	0	0	—		0	0
Negeri Sembilan	Total		0	0	0	0	0	0	0	0	0	0
Career total			47	0	2	0	5	0	1	0	55	0
