= Rahman Daud =

Malaysian footballer

Personal information
- Full name: Abdul Rahman bin Daud
- Date of birth: 4 December 2004 (age 21)
- Place of birth: Damascus, Syria
- Position: Forward

Team information
- Current team: Negeri Sembilan
- Number: 16

Youth career
- 2019–2021: Mokhtar Dahari Academy

Senior career*
Years	Team	Apps	(Gls)
2022–2023	Selangor	1	(0)
2022–2026	Selangor II	39	(25)
2026–	Negeri Sembilan	0	(0)

International career^{‡}
2022	Malaysia U19	2	(0)
2025	Malaysia U23	3	(0)
- * Club domestic league appearances and goals as of 7 July 2026 (UTC) ‡ National team caps and goals as of 7 July 2026

Abdul Rahman bin Daud (born 4 December 2004) is a professional footballer who plays as a forward for Malaysia Super League club Negeri Sembilan. Born in Syria, he represents Malaysia at international level.

== Early life ==
Rahman was born in Damascus, Syria, to a Malaysian father and an Italian mother, and is of Malaysian-Italian descent. He spent his early childhood in Syria before his family relocated to Malaysia following the outbreak of conflict in the country. Arriving in Malaysia at the age of eight, he initially settled in Pahang, where he studied at Sekolah Kebangsaan Janda Baik and lived until the age of ten. His family later moved to Malacca, where they have remained ever since.

== Club career ==
=== Early career ===
Rahman began his football career with SSN Melaka and MSS Melaka before joining the Mokhtar Dahari Academy through the National Football Development Programme (NFDP) in 2019. After completing his development at the academy in 2021, he was signed by Selangor II ahead of the 2022 season.

=== Selangor II ===
Rahman featured for Selangor II in the 2022 Malaysia Premier League, making 14 appearances and scoring once during the season. He also made his senior debut for Selangor on 4 March 2022 against Kuala Lumpur City, coming on as an 80th-minute substitute to mark his first appearance for the club's first team.

During the 2023 and 2024–25 seasons, Rahman represented Selangor II in the MFL Cup. In the 2024–25 campaign, he played a key role in helping the team finish as runners-up and finished as the club's top scorer with 12 goals.

In the 2025–26 season, Rahman competed in the Malaysia A1 Semi-Pro League, where he finished as Selangor II's top scorer for the second consecutive season with 24 goals. In May 2026, he announced his departure from the club following the conclusion of the campaign.

=== Negeri Sembilan ===
On 6 July 2026, Negeri Sembilan FC announced the signing of Rahman from Selangor II on a three-year contract, keeping him at the club until 2029.

== International career ==
=== Malaysia U19 ===
In 2022, Rahman was called up to the Malaysia under-19 squad for the 2022 AFF U-19 Youth Championship. He made his international debut on 7 July 2022 against Singapore under-19, coming on as a 69th-minute substitute. Malaysia went on to win the tournament, defeating Laos under-19 2–0 in the final.

=== Malaysia U23 ===
In 2025, he made his first appearance for the Malaysia under-23 team on 15 July 2025 against the Philippines under-23 football team in the 2025 AFF U-23 Championship. Malaysia were eliminated in the group stage after finishing second in Group A, failing to qualify for the semi-finals.

== Career statistics ==
=== Club ===
As of 7 July 2026

Club	Season	League			Cup		League Cup		Total	
Club	Season	Division	Apps	Goals	Apps	Goals	Apps	Goals	Apps	Goals
Selangor	2022	Malaysia Super League	1	0	0	0	0	0	1	0
Selangor	2023	Malaysia Super League	0	0	0	0	1	0	1	0
Selangor	Total		1	0	0	0	1	0	2	0
Selangor II	2022	Malaysia Premier League	14	1	0	0	0	0	14	1
Selangor II	2023	MFL Cup	—							
Selangor II	2024–25	MFL Cup	—							
Selangor II	2025–26	A1 Semi-Pro	25	24	0	0	0	0	25	24
Selangor II	Total		39	25	0	0	0	0	41	25
Negeri Sembilan	2026–27	Malaysia Super League	0	0	0	0	0	0	0	0
Negeri Sembilan	Total		0	0	0	0	0	0	0	0
Career total			40	25	0	0	1	0	41	25
