= Wai Lin Aung (footballer, born 1999) =

Burmese footballer

Personal information
- Date of birth: 30 July 1999 (age 27)
- Place of birth: Katha Township, Myanmar
- Height: 1.70 m (5 ft 7 in)
- Position: Midfielder

Team information
- Current team: Negeri Sembilan
- Number: 8

Youth career
- 2013–2017: ISPE (Mandalay)

Senior career*
Years	Team	Apps	(Gls)
2018–2021	ISPE	19	(1)
2022–2023	Dagon Star United	6	(2)
2024–2025	Yangon United	14	(3)
2025–	Negeri Sembilan	16	(0)

International career^{‡}
2022	Myanmar U23	12	(0)
2022–	Myanmar	24	(1)
- * Club domestic league appearances and goals as of 28 July 2026 ‡ National team caps and goals as of 28 July 2026

Wai Lin Aung (Burmese: ဝေလင်းအောင်, born 30 July 1999) is a Burmese professional footballer who plays as a midfielder for Malaysia Super League club Negeri Sembilan. He began his youth career at the Institute of Sports and Physical Education (ISPE) in Mandalay, progressing to their senior team in 2018. After helping ISPE earn promotion to the Myanmar National League, he joined Dagon Star United in 2022, where he became a regular starter.

In January 2024, Wai Lin Aung signed with Yangon United and quickly established himself as a key player in midfield. Known for his defensive work rate, ball distribution, and tactical awareness, he contributed several goals and assists in his debut season. Internationally, he has represented Myanmar at both youth and senior levels.

== Club career ==
=== Dagon Star United ===
Wai Lin Aung joined Dagon Star United in 2022 after progressing through the youth ranks of ISPE. During his time at the club, he quickly established himself as a key figure in midfield, known for his strong ball-winning ability, tactical awareness, and composure in distribution. In the 2023 Myanmar National League season, he made around 18 appearances, scored 2 goals, and provided one assist, playing a central role in Dagon’s solid fifth-place finish. His performances drew widespread attention for their consistency and maturity, particularly in high-pressure matches. As a result, he was included in Myanmar’s preliminary squad for the 2026 FIFA World Cup qualifiers, marking a significant step in his international career. His standout form ultimately earned him a transfer to Yangon United in January 2024, highlighting his steady rise as one of the country’s most promising midfielders.

=== Yangon United ===
Wai Lin Aung officially joined Yangon United on 16 January 2024 after an impressive stint at Dagon Star United. Since then, he has cemented himself in the squad as a defensive/central midfielder, wearing the #14 jersey and known for his tackling, ball-winning, and effective distribution . During the 2024–25 Myanmar National League, he appeared in 14 matches, logged 991 minutes, and scored 3 goals, showcasing a steady presence in the midfield and offensive contribution. His consistent performances have been reflected in both playing time and growth in market valuation, earning him recognition as a reliable midfield asset for Yangon United. In July 2025, Yangon United terminated Wai Linn Aung's contract for player's transfer plan.

=== Negeri Sembilan ===
Wai Lin Aung moved to Negeri Sembilan on a free transfer in 2025.

== International career ==
Wai Lin Aung made his senior debut for Myanmar in 2022 and has since earned 40 caps, scoring one goal. His involvement grew steadily—ten substitute appearance in 2022, followed by nine in 2023 (including two off the bench), and a breakthrough in 2024 with 12 starts and one goal during the 2026 FIFA World Cup qualifiers, spanning 283 minutes. In the 2025 cycle, he was a consistent choice, ranking 7th overall in appearances, highlighting his increasing importance in Myanmar's midfield setup.

== Career statistics ==
=== Club ===
As of 8 June 2026

Club	Season	League			Cup		League Cup		Total	
Club	Season	Division	Apps	Goals	Apps	Goals	Apps	Goals	Apps	Goals
ISPE	2020	Myanmar National League	8	0	0	0	0	0	8	0
ISPE	2022	Myanmar National League	11	1	0	0	0	0	11	1
ISPE	Total		19	1	0	0	0	0	19	1
Dagon Star United	2023	Myanmar National League	6	2	0	0	0	0	6	2
Dagon Star United	Total		6	2	0	0	0	0	6	2
Yangon United	2024–25	Myanmar National League	14	3	0	0	1	2	15	5
Yangon United	Total		14	3	0	0	1	2	15	5
Negeri Sembilan	2025–26	Malaysia Super League	13	0	2	0	1	0	16	0
Negeri Sembilan	2026–27	Malaysia Super League	0	0	0	0	0	0	0	0
Negeri Sembilan	Total		13	0	2	0	1	0	16	0
Career total			52	6	2	0	2	2	56	8

=== International ===
As of match played 9 June 2026

Appearances and goals by national team and year
National team	Year	Apps	Goals
Myanmar	2022	1	0
Myanmar	2023	9	0
Myanmar	2024	9	1
Myanmar	2025	1	0
Myanmar	2026	4	0
Total		24	1

Scores and results list Myanmar's goal tally first, score column indicates score after each Wai Lin Aung goal.

List of international goals scored by Wai Lin Aung
No.	Date	Venue	Opponent	Score	Result	Competition
1	11 June 2024	New Laos National Stadium, Vientiane, Laos	North Korea	1–3	1–4	2026 FIFA World Cup qualification

== Honours ==
Yangon United

- Champions (1):MNL Cup: 2025
