= Wan Kuzri =

American soccer player (born 2002)

Personal information
- Full name: Wan Kuzri bin Wan Ahmad Kamal
- Date of birth: August 9, 2002 (age 24)
- Place of birth: Carbondale, Illinois, U.S.
- Height: 5 ft 11 in (1.80 m)
- Position: Midfielder

Team information
- Current team: Negeri Sembilan
- Number: 6

Youth career
- St. Louis Scott Gallagher

College career
Years	Team	Apps	(Gls)
2021–2024	Akron Zips	75	(9)

Senior career*
Years	Team	Apps	(Gls)
2022	Kaw Valley FC	7	(0)
2023–2024	St. Charles	23	(4)
2025–2026	Akron City	3	(1)
2026–	Negeri Sembilan	0	(0)
2026	→ UM-Damansara (loan)	13	(4)
- * Club domestic league appearances and goals as of July 14, 2026

Wan Kuzri bin Wan Ahmad Kamal (born August 9, 2002) is an American soccer player who plays as a midfielder for Malaysia Super League club Negeri Sembilan.

== Early life and education ==
Kuzri was born and raised in the United States. He is a native of Carbondale, Illinois. As a youth player, Kuzri joined the St. Louis Scott Gallagher Academy.

Kuzri attended the University of Akron.

== Club career ==
=== St. Charles ===
On May 1, 2023, Wan Kuzri joined USL League Two club St. Charles.

On March 6, 2024, Wan Kuzri joined St. Charles again on 1 August 2024.

=== Akron City ===
On July 1, 2025, Wan Kuzri joined USL League Two club Akron City.

On July 14, Wan Kuzri scored his first goal for Akron City in 3–0 win against Toledo Villa in USL League Two.

=== Negeri Sembilan ===
On January 19, 2026, Malaysia Super League club Negeri Sembilan announced the signing of Wan Kuzri in the second transfer window of the Malaysia Super League.

=== UM Damansara United ===
On January 21, 2026, Wan Kuzri joined Malaysia A1 Semi-Pro League club UM Damansara United on loan from Negeri Sembilan. He joined the club to gain experience playing in Malaysia League.

On January 30, Kuzri made his team debut with UM-Damansara United in a 1–1 draw against Malaysian University. He made his debut in the second half of the match as a substitute.

On February 10, Kuzri scored his first league goal for the club in a 2–2 draw against Armed Forces. He scored both goals in the game, securing a point for the team.

== Career statistics ==
=== Club ===
As of June 8, 2026

Club	Season	League			Cup		League Cup		Other		Total	
Club	Season	Division	Apps	Goals	Apps	Goals	Apps	Goals	Apps	Goals	Apps	Goals
Negeri Sembilan	2025–26	Malaysia Super League	0	0	0	0	0	0	—		0	0
Negeri Sembilan	2026–27	Malaysia Super League	0	0	0	0	0	0	—		0	0
Negeri Sembilan	Total		0	0	0	0	0	0	—		0	0
UM-Damansara (loan)	2025–26	A1 Semi-Pro League	13	4	0	0	0	0	2 (Note: MFL Challenge Cup)	1	15	5
UM-Damansara (loan)	Total		13	4	0	0	0	0	2	1	15	5
Career total			13	4	0	0	0	0	2	1	15	5

== International career ==
Kuzri has been called up to represent Malaysia at the Malaysia under-19 and under-23 levels, but he has never made an appearance.

== Personal life ==
Kuzri is the younger brother of Wan Kuzain, a professional soccer player in the United States. His older brother, Wan Ahmad Fayhsal, is a Malaysian politician.
