= Ubaidullah Shamsul Fazili =

Malaysian footballer

Ubaidullah Shamsul
Personal information
- Full name: Muhammad Ubaidullah bin Shamsul Fazili
- Date of birth: 30 November 2003 (age 22)
- Place of birth: Kota Bharu, Malaysia
- Height: 1.82 m (5 ft 11 1/2 in)
- Position: Centre-back

Team information
- Current team: Terengganu
- Number: 3

Youth career
- 2021–2022: FAM-MSN Project
- 2023: Terengganu II

Senior career*
Years	Team	Apps	(Gls)
2023–	Terengganu	29	(2)

International career^{‡}
2022	Malaysia U19	5	(0)
2022–2023	Malaysia U20	8	(0)
2022–	Malaysia U23	24	(1)
2025–	Malaysia	15	(0)
Medal record
Men's football
Representing Malaysia
FIFA ASEAN Cup
Third place	2026 Indonesia
ASEAN U-19 Boys' Championship
Winner	2022
Merlion Cup
Winner	2023
- * Club domestic league appearances and goals as of 27 August 2025 ‡ National team caps and goals as of 17 November 2026

Muhammad Ubaidullah bin Shamsul Fazili (born 30 November 2003), sometimes known mononymously as Ubaidullah, is a Malaysian professional footballer who plays as a centre-back for Malaysia Super League club Terengganu and the Malaysia national team.

== Early life ==
Ubaidullah was born in Kampung Cherang, Kota Bharu, Kelantan.

== International career ==
=== Youth ===
In July 2022, Ubaidullah has been selected for Malaysia U19 to compete in the 2022 AFF U-19 Youth Championship. He has brought Malaysia U19 win 2–0 over Laos U19 in the final to be crowned champions for the second time.

In March 2023, Ubaidullah listed in the 2023 Merlion Cup campaign held in Singapore. He successfully led Malaysia U22 won in the final match against Hong Kong U23 to become the Merlion Cup champion.

=== Senior ===
On 30 May 2025, Ubaidullah earned his first senior cap during a 1–1 draw against Cape Verde in a friendly match at the Kuala Lumpur Stadium.

== Career statistics ==
=== Club ===
As of match played 17 August 2025

Appearances and goals by club, season and competition
Club	Season	League (Note: Including Malaysia Charity Shield)			Cup		League Cup		Continental (Note: Including AFC Cup, AFC Champions League, and ASEAN Club Championship)		Total	
Club	Season	Division	Apps	Goals	Apps	Goals	Apps	Goals	Apps	Goals	Apps	Goals
Terengganu	2023	Malaysia Super League	6	0	0	0	6	0	4	0	16	0
Terengganu	2024–25	Malaysia Super League	21	2	5	0	5	0	5	0	36	2
Terengganu	2025–26	Malaysia Super League	2	0	1	0	0	0	0	0	3	0
Terengganu	Total		29	2	6	0	11	0	9	0	55	0
Career total			0	0	0	0	0	0	0	0	0	0

=== International ===
As of 6 October 2026

Appearances and goals by national team and year
National team	Year	Apps	Goals
Malaysia	2025	3	0
Malaysia	2026	12	0
Total		15	0

== Honours ==
Malaysia U19

- ASEAN U-19 Boys' Championship: 2022

Malaysia U22

- Merlion Cup: 2023

Malaysia U23

- ASEAN U-23 Championship 4th Place: 2023
