= Yusuke Minagawa =

Japanese footballer (born 1991)

Yusuke Minagawa 皆川 佑介
Personal information
- Full name: Yusuke Minagawa
- Date of birth: 9 October 1991 (age 35)
- Place of birth: Tokorozawa, Saitama, Japan
- Height: 1.86 m (6 ft 1 in)
- Position: Forward

Team information
- Current team: Negeri Sembilan
- Number: 13

Youth career
- 2007–2009: Maebashi Ikuei High School

College career
Years	Team	Apps	(Gls)
2010–2013	Chuo University		

Senior career*
Years	Team	Apps	(Gls)
2014–2019	Sanfrecce Hiroshima	65	(5)
2018	→ Roasso Kumamoto (loan)	41	(11)
2019–2020	Yokohama FC	45	(4)
2021-2022	Vegalta Sendai	48	(5)
2023	Renofa Yamaguchi FC	30	(2)
2024–2026	Nagaworld	59	(27)
2026–	Negeri Sembilan	0	(0)

International career
2014	Japan	1	(0)
Medal record
Sanfrecce Hiroshima
Winner	J1 League	2015
Runner-up	J.League Cup	2014
- * Club domestic league appearances and goals as of 13:06, 18 May 2026 (AEST)

Yusuke Minagawa (皆川 佑介, Minagawa Yūsuke) (born 9 October 1991) is a Japanese international football player who plays for Malaysia Super League club, Negeri Sembilan as a striker.

== Career ==
=== Negeri Sembilan FC ===
On 17 August 2026, Negeri Sembilan FC announced the signing of Yusuke Minagawa from Cambodian club Nagaworld FC for the 2026–27 season.

== Personal life ==
Minagawa is a distant relative of Masahiro Kaneko.

== Club statistics ==
As of 18 August 2026.

Club performance			League		Cup		League Cup		Continental		Other		Total	
Club	Season	League	Apps	Goals	Apps	Goals	Apps	Goals	Apps	Goals	Apps	Goals	Apps	Goals
Japan			League		Emperor's Cup		League Cup		Asia		Other^{1}		Total	
Sanfrecce Hiroshima	2014	J1 League	18	3	3	2	3	0	1	0	0	0	25	5
Sanfrecce Hiroshima	2015	J1 League	5	0	3	3	3	0	–		3	1	14	4
Sanfrecce Hiroshima	2016	J1 League	19	2	2	0	1	1	6	1	0	0	22	3
Sanfrecce Hiroshima	2017	J1 League	18	1	1	1	4	0	–		–		23	2
Sanfrecce Hiroshima	Total		60	6	9	6	11	1	7	1	3	1	84	14
Roasso Kumamoto (loan)	2018	J2 League	41	11	0	0	–		–		–		41	11
Roasso Kumamoto (loan)	Total		41	11	0	0	0	0	0	0	0	0	41	11
Yokohama FC	2019	J2 League	16	1	0	0	–		–		–		16	1
Yokohama FC	2020	J1 League	29	3	–		0	0	–		–		29	3
Yokohama FC	Total		45	4	0	0	0	0	0	0	0	0	45	4
Vegalta Sendai	2021	J1 League	15	0	1	0	6	1	–		–		22	1
Vegalta Sendai	2022	J2 League	33	5	2	0	–		–		–		35	5
Vegalta Sendai	Total		48	5	3	0	6	1	0	0	0	0	57	6
Renofa Yamaguchi	2023	J2 League	30	2	1	0	–		–		–		31	2
Cambodia			League		Hun Sen Cup		League Cup		Asia		Other		Total	
Nagaworld	2024–25	Cambodian Premier League	29	14	0	0	0	0	–		–		29	14
Nagaworld	2025–26	Cambodian Premier League	30	13	0	0	0	0	–		–		30	13
Nagaworld	Total		59	27	0	0	0	0	0	0	0	0	59	27
Malaysia			League		Malaysia FA Cup		Malaysia Cup		Asia		Other		Total	
Negeri Sembilan	2026–27	Malaysia Super League	0	0	0	0	0	0	–		–		0	0
Career total			283	55	13	6	17	2	7	1	3	1	278	65

^{1}Includes Japanese Super Cup, J. League Championship and FIFA Club World Cup.

== National team statistics ==
Japan national team
Year	Apps	Goals
2014	1	0
Total	1	0
