= Khalai'f Naskam =

Malaysian footballer (born 2002)

Personal information
- Full name: Mohamad Khalai'f bin Mohd Naskam
- Date of birth: 6 May 2002 (age 24)
- Place of birth: Kota Bharu, Kelantan, Malaysia
- Position: Midfielder

Team information
- Current team: Terengganu
- Number: 13

Youth career
- 2022–2023: Kelantan U23
- 2024–2025: Terengganu II

Senior career*
Years	Team	Apps	(Gls)
2022–2023	Kelantan	13	(1)
2024–2025	Terengganu II	0	(0)
2025–2026	Terengganu	4	(1)
2026–	Penang	0	(0)
- * Club domestic league appearances and goals as of 14 August 2026

Mohamad Khalai'f bin Mohd Naskam (born 6 May 2002) is a Malaysian professional footballer who plays as a midfielder for Malaysia Super League club Terengganu.

== Club career ==
=== Terengganu II ===
On 3 March 2024, Khalai'f joined Terengganu II.

=== Penang ===
On 4 July 2026, Khalai'f joined Penang on free transfer after leaving Terengganu.

== Career statistics ==
=== Club ===
As of match played 27 August 2025

Appearances and goals by club, season and competition
Club	Season	League			Cup		League Cup		Continental		Total	
Club	Season	Division	Apps	Goals	Apps	Goals	Apps	Goals	Apps	Goals	Apps	Goals
Kelantan	2023	Malaysia Super League	13	1	0	0	2	1	–		13	1
Kelantan	Total		13	1	0	0	0	0	–		13	1
Terengganu	2025–26	Malaysia Super League	4	1	1	0	0	0	–		5	1
Terengganu	Total		4	1	1	0	0	0	–		5	1
Career Total			0	0	0	0	0	0	–	–	0	0
