= Kei Oshiro =

Japanese footballer (born 2000)

Personal information
- Date of birth: 16 September 2000 (age 26)
- Place of birth: Okinawa, Japan
- Height: 1.82 m (6 ft 0 in)
- Position: Centre back

Team information
- Current team: Negeri Sembilan
- Number: 5

Youth career
- Eleven Yonabaru
- –2015: W-Wing Okinawa
- 2016–2018: Urawa Red Diamonds

Senior career*
Years	Team	Apps	(Gls)
2019–2021	Urawa Reds	0	(0)
2020	→ Gainare Tottori (loan)	3	(0)
2021	→ YSCC Yokohama (loan)	28	(2)
2022–2024	Ehime	35	(0)
2024–2025	Gainare Tottori	22	(1)
2026–	Negeri Sembilan	11	(1)
- * Club domestic league appearances and goals as of 8 Jun 2026

Kei Oshiro (大城 蛍, Oshiro Kei; born 16 September 2000) is a Japanese footballer currently playing as a centre back for Malaysia Super League club Negeri Sembilan.

== Club career ==
=== Gainare Tottori ===
On 8 January 2024, Kei Oshiro joined Gainare Tottori from Ehime FC ahead of the new season.

=== Negeri Sembilan ===
On 5 January 2026, Kei Oshiro joined Negeri Sembilan for the remainder of the 2025–26 season.

== Career statistics ==
=== Club ===
As of 8 June 2026.

Club	Season	League			National Cup		League Cup		Other		Total	
Club	Season	Division	Apps	Goals	Apps	Goals	Apps	Goals	Apps	Goals	Apps	Goals
Urawa Red Diamonds	2020	J1 League	0	0	0	0	0	0	0	0	0	0
Urawa Red Diamonds	Total		0	0	0	0	0	0	0	0	0	0
Gainare Tottori (loan)	2020	J3 League	3	0	0	0	–		0	0	2	0
Gainare Tottori (loan)	Total		3	0	0	0	0	0	0	0	2	0
YSCC Yokohama (loan)	2021	J3 League	26	2	2	0	0	0	0	0	28	2
YSCC Yokohama (loan)	Total		26	2	2	0	0	0	0	0	28	2
Ehime	2022	J3 League	13	0	0	0	0	0	0	0	13	0
Ehime	2023	J3 League	22	0	0	0	0	0	0	0	22	0
Ehime	Total		35	0	0	0	0	0	0	0	35	0
Gainare Tottori	2024	J3 League	21	1	0	0	1	0	0	0	22	1
Gainare Tottori	2025	J3 League	0	0	0	0	0	0	0	0	0	0
Gainare Tottori	Total		21	1	0	0	1	0	0	0	22	1
Negeri Sembilan	2025–26	Malaysia Super League	11	1	0	0	3	0	0	0	14	1
Negeri Sembilan	2026–27	Malaysia Super League	0	0	0	0	0	0	0	0	0	0
Negeri Sembilan	Total		11	1	0	0	3	0	0	0	14	1
Career total			96	4	2	0	3	0	0	0	101	4
