= Yūichi Hirano =

Japanese footballer

Yūichi Hirano 平野 佑一
Personal information
- Full name: Yūichi Hirano
- Date of birth: March 11, 1996 (age 30)
- Place of birth: Tokyo, Japan
- Height: 1.74 m (5 ft 9 in)
- Position: Central midfielder

Team information
- Current team: Negeri Sembilan
- Number: 24

Youth career
- Kinder Yoshimitsu SC
- –2010: Tokyo Verdy 1969
- 2011–2013: Kokugakuin Univ. Kugayama High School

College career
Years	Team	Apps	(Gls)
2014–2017	Kokushikan University		

Senior career*
Years	Team	Apps	(Gls)
2018–2021	Mito HollyHock	68	(1)
2021–2023	Urawa Red Diamonds	29	(0)
2024–2025	Cerezo Osaka	10	(0)
2026–	Negeri Sembilan	7	(0)
- * Club domestic league appearances and goals as of 8 June 2026 (UTC)

Yūichi Hirano (平野 佑一, Hirano Yūichi; born March 11, 1996) is a Japanese professional footballer who plays as a central midfielder for Malaysia Super League club Negeri Sembilan.

== Playing career ==
Hirano was born in Tokyo on March 11, 1996. After graduating from Kokushikan University, he joined J2 League club Mito HollyHock in 2018.

=== Negeri Sembilan ===
On 2 February 2026, Hirano moved to Malaysia Super League club Negeri Sembilan.

== Club statistics ==
As of 8 June 2026

Appearances and goals by club, season and competition
Club	Season	League			National cup		League cup		Other		Total	
Club	Season	Division	Apps	Goals	Apps	Goals	Apps	Goals	Apps	Goals	Apps	Goals
Japan			League		Emperor's Cup		J. League Cup		Other		Total	
Mito Hollyhock	2018	J2 League	5	1	1	0	–		–		6	1
Mito Hollyhock	2019	J2 League	20	0	0	0	–		–		20	0
Mito Hollyhock	2020	J2 League	24	0	0	0	–		–		24	0
Mito Hollyhock	2021	J2 League	19	0	0	0	–		–		19	0
Mito Hollyhock	Total		68	1	1	0	0	0	0	0	69	1
Urawa Red Diamonds	2021	J1 League	13	0	3	0	4	0	–		20	0
Urawa Red Diamonds	2022	J1 League	9	0	1	0	0	0	3 (Note: Appearance in the Super Cup) (Note: Appearances in the AFC Champions League)	0	13	0
Urawa Red Diamonds	2023	J1 League	7	0	2	0	6	0	0	0	15	0
Urawa Red Diamonds	Total		29	0	6	0	10	0	3	0	48	0
Cerezo Osaka	2024	J1 League	10	0	2	0	2	0	0	0	14	0
Cerezo Osaka	2025	J1 League	0	0	0	0	0	0	0	0	0	0
Cerezo Osaka	Total		10	0	2	0	2	0	0	0	14	0
Malaysia			League		Malaysia FA Cup		Malaysia Cup		Other		Total	
Negeri Sembilan	2025–26	M-Super League	7	0	0	0	2	0	—		9	0
Negeri Sembilan	2026–27	M-Super League	0	0	0	0	0	0	—		0	0
Negeri Sembilan	Total		7	0	0	0	2	0	—		9	0
Career total			114	1	9	0	14	0	3	0	140	1

== Honours ==
=== Club ===
Urawa Red Diamonds

- Japanese Super Cup: 2022
- AFC Champions League: 2022
