= Raimi Shamsul =

Malaysian footballer

Personal information
- Full name: Muhammad Raimi bin Shamsul
- Date of birth: 28 October 2002 (age 24)
- Place of birth: Malacca, Malaysia
- Height: 1.76 m (5 ft 9 1/2 in)
- Positions: Right back; midfielder

Team information
- Current team: Negeri Sembilan
- Number: 2

Youth career
- 2017–2019: Mokhtar Dahari Academy
- 2020–2025: Selangor II

Senior career*
Years	Team	Apps	(Gls)
2025–2026	Selangor	3	(0)
2026–	Negeri Sembilan	0	(0)

International career^{‡}
2018–2020	Malaysia U19	4	(0)
2020	Malaysia U23		
- * Club domestic league appearances and goals as of June 7, 2026 ‡ National team caps and goals as of 28 May 2022

Muhammad Raimi bin Shamsul (born 28 October 2002) is a Malaysian professional footballer who plays as a right back for Malaysia Super League club Negeri Sembilan.

== Club career ==
=== Youth career ===
Raimi Shamsul began his football journey with Klebang FC in Malacca at the age of 11. After graduating from the MSSM, he was selected for the National Football Development Programme (NFDP), which placed him at Tunku Mahkota Ismail Sports School in 2015. He continued his development at Bukit Jalil Sports School in 2016 before being transferred to the Mokhtar Dahari Academy in 2017, where he remained until completing the programme. Following his graduation from AMD, Raimi joined Selangor's youth setup in 2020.

=== Selangor ===
On early career, Raimi signed for Selangor from Academy Mokhtar Dahari at the age of 18. He then progressed through the club's youth setup, playing for the under-21 and under-23 squads. He made his Selangor reserves debut with a full 90-minutes played in a 3–0 win against Kelantan reserves on 17 April 2023. Raimi was an unused substitute during Selangor's league against Terengganu at the MBPJ Stadium on 5 April 2025. He made his first debut for Selangor FC versus Malaysian University as a substitute after replacing Faisal Halim at 62nd minute in the FA Cup 2025–2026.

=== Negeri Sembilan ===
On 8 July 2026, Negeri Sembilan announced the signing of Raimi from Selangor ahead of the 2026–27 season.

== International career ==
=== Youth ===
On 30 October 2019, Raimi was called up to the Malaysia under-19 by Brad Maloney for the 2020 AFC U-19 Championship qualification in Cambodia.

== Career statistics ==
=== Club ===
As of match played 27 May 2026

Appearances and goals by club, season and competition
Club	Season	League			Cup (Note: Appearances in Malaysia FA Cup)		League Cup (Note: Appearances in Malaysia Cup)		Continental		Other		Total	
Club	Season	Division	Apps	Goals	Apps	Goals	Apps	Goals	Apps	Goals	Apps	Goals	Apps	Goals
Selangor	2024–25	Malaysia Super League	0	0	0	0	0	0	0 (Note: Appearances in AFC Champions League Two)	0	0 (Note: Appearance(s) in MFL Challenge Cup)	0	0	0
Selangor	2025–26	Malaysia Super League	3	0	3	0	0	0	3	0	1 (Note: Appearance(s) in ASEAN Club Championship)	0	10	0
Selangor	Total		3	0	3	0	0	0	3	0	1	0	10	0
Negeri Sembilan	2026–27	Malaysia Super League	0	0	0	0	0	0	—				0	0
Negeri Sembilan	Total		0	0	0	0	0	0	0	0	0	0	0	0
Career total			3	0	3	0	0	0	3	0	1	0	10	0
