= Harry Föll =

Filipino footballer

Personal information
- Full name: Harry Heinrich Beloro Föll
- Date of birth: 2 March 1998 (age 28)
- Place of birth: Offenburg, Germany
- Height: 1.81 m (5 ft 11 in)
- Position: Attacking midfielder

Team information
- Current team: Villingen
- Number: 15

Youth career
- 2004–2007: TuS Windschläg
- 2007–2010: Offenburger FV
- 2010–2015: SC Freiburg
- 2015–2017: 1. FC Heidenheim

Senior career*
Years	Team	Apps	(Gls)
2017–2018	Hansa Rostock	1	(0)
2017–2018	Hansa Rostock II	11	(2)
2018	Oldenburg	3	(0)
2018–2019	Linx	16	(3)
2019–2020	Oberachern	10	(1)
2020–	Villingen	11	(0)

International career^{‡}
2022–	Philippines	2	(0)
- * Club domestic league appearances and goals as of 06:33; 20 March 2022 (UTC) ‡ National team caps and goals as of 14:07; 29 March 2022 (UTC).

Harry Heinrich Beloro Föll (born 2 March 1998) is a footballer who plays as an attacking midfielder for German Oberliga Baden-Württemberg club FC 08 Villingen. Born in Germany, he plays for the Philippines national team.

== Club career ==
=== Oldenburg ===
In June 2018, Föll joined Regionalliga Nord club Oldenburg in a two-year deal.

=== Linx ===
In November 2018, Föll joined Oberliga Baden-Württemberg club Linx until the end of the 2018–19 season.

== International career ==
Föll was born and raised in Germany to a German father and a Filipino mother which made him eligible to play for Germany or the Philippines.

=== Philippines ===
In August 2017, he was named in the Philippines' 23-man squad for their 2019 AFC Asian Cup qualifiers against Yemen on 5 September 2017.

In November 2021, he was named in the Philippines' 27-man preliminary squad for the 2020 AFF Championship.

Föll was included in the 25-man squad of the Philippines for 2022 FAS Tri-Nations Series.

He debuted in a 2–0 friendly loss to Malaysia on 23 March 2022.
