= Daniel Giménez (football manager) =

Spanish football coach (born 1984)

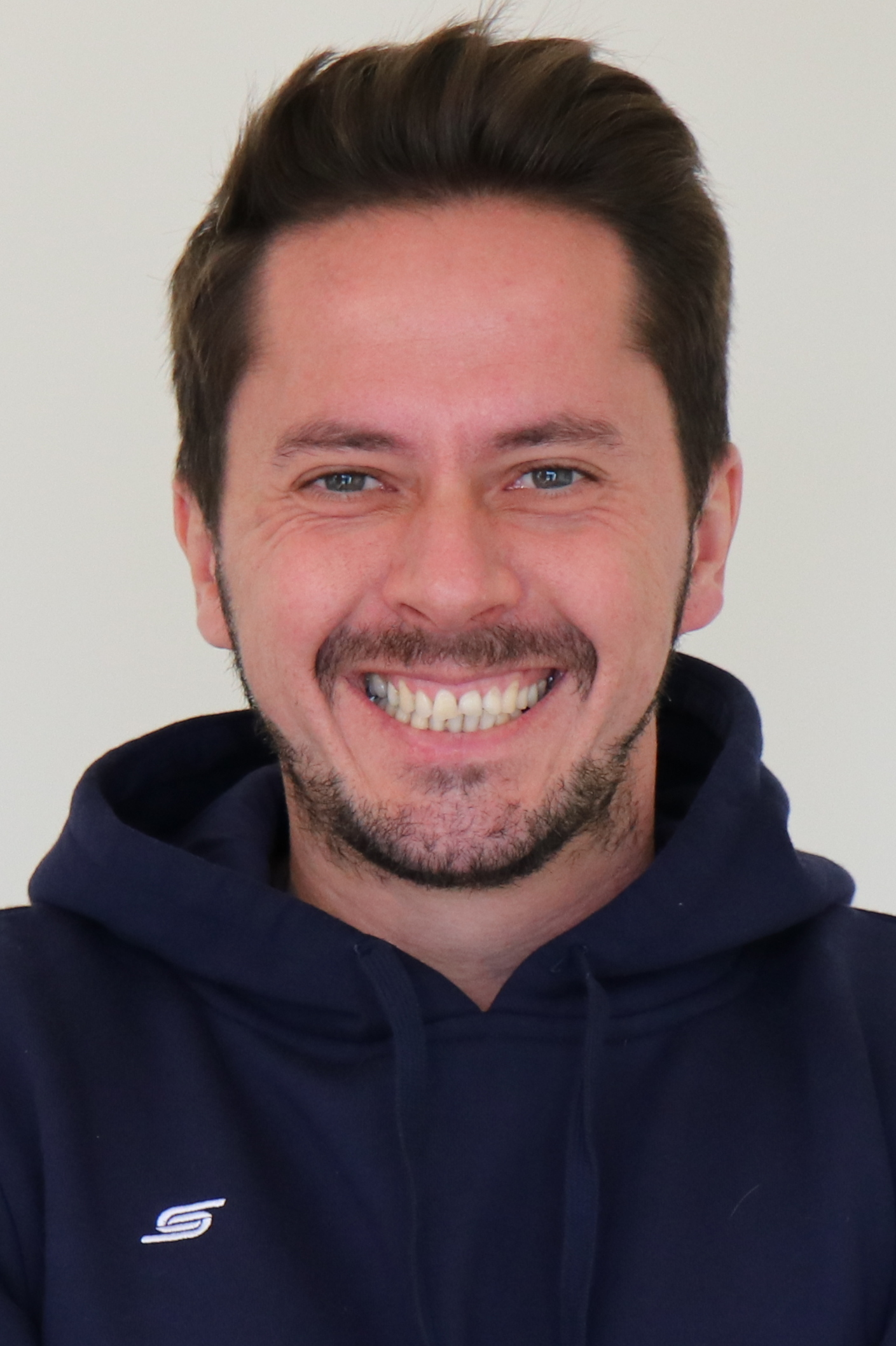
- Giménez in 2021

Personal information
- Full name: Daniel Giménez Alcañiz
- Date of birth: 22 June 1984 (age 42)
- Place of birth: Barcelona, Spain
- Height: 1.78 m (5 ft 10 in)

Team information
- Current team: Negeri Sembilan (manager)

Managerial career
- Years: Team
- 2014–2016: CD Alegría
- 2016–2018: Amal Salam Zgharta
- 2019–2020: Ahed (assistant)
- 2020: Ahed
- 2020–2021: Ahed (assistant)
- 2021: Nejmeh (assistant)
- 2021: Nejmeh (interim)
- 2021–2022: Al Hilal Omdurman (assistant)
- 2022–2023: Lebanon U18
- 2022–2023: Akhaa Ahli Aley
- 2023–2025: Modern Sport FC (assistant)
- 2025–2026: Al Nasr Salalah
- 2026–: Negeri Sembilan

Daniel Giménez Alcañiz (born 22 June 1984) is a Spanish football coach who is the manager of Malaysia Super League club Negeri Sembilan.

== Career ==
=== Spain ===
Born in Barcelona, Spain, Giménez began his career by coaching youth teams in his native city. He coached in youth categories for CE L'Hospitalet, CE Júpiter, and the FC Barcelona Academy. He then coached the under-19 teams of UE Sants and CB Terlenka. Between 2014 and 2016, he was head coach of CD Alegría in the Quarta Catalana. In 2015, he obtained the UEFA Pro Licence.

=== Move to Lebanon ===
In 2016, Giménez moved to Lebanon, where he was head coach of Salam Zgharta's reserve team Amal Salam Zgharta until 2017, when he became head coach of their under-19 team for one season. He then moved to the Eleven Football Pro academy, before opening his own academy in January 2020, Club Deportivo Beirut.

=== Ahed ===
Giménez joined Ahed's technical staff in 2019, and was also a supervisor of the youth teams. In September 2019, Giménez was appointed technical director, before becoming Bassem Marmar's assistant coach in November. As an assistant coach, he helped Ahed win the 2019 Lebanese Super Cup and the 2019 AFC Cup.

On 28 July 2020, Giménez was announced head coach of the team, following Marmar's move to Al-Arabi in Kuwait. On 28 September, Giménez asked to be relieved of his duties, and returned assistant coach of Ahed.

=== Nejmeh ===
On 23 June 2021, Giménez became assistant coach of Nejmeh, as well as the head coach of their under-20 team. As Nejmeh's coach, Youssef Al Jawhari, left the club mid-season, Giménez coached Nejmeh's league game against Safa on 12 September, in a goalless draw. He helped the U20 team finish first in their group in the 2021–22 season.

=== Al-Hilal ===
On 3 December 2021, Giménez was announced assistant coach of Sudanese club Al-Hilal. They participated in the CAF Champions League Group A in the group stage. With Al-Hilal Club, Giménez won the Sudan Premier League.

=== Lebanon U17 and Akhaa Ahli Aley ===
Giménez was appointed head coach of the Lebanon national under-17 team ahead of the 2023 AFC U-17 Asian Cup qualification. On 26 October 2022, he became head coach of Akhaa Ahli Aley in the Lebanese Premier League.

=== Modern Sport FC ===
With Modern Sport FC, they participated in the CAF Confederation Cup where they qualified to quarter-finals and lose against Zamalek Sporting Club.

In December 2023, they played the Egyptian Super Cup in Emirates. They won the semi-finals against Pyramids FC and ended as runners-up of the tournament after losing against Al-Ahly in the final.

=== Negeri Sembilan ===
On 26 June 2026, Negeri Sembilan announced the appointment of Daniel Giménez as the club's new head coach for the 2026–27 season, replacing interim head coach Rajan Koran.

== Managerial statistics ==
As of match played 20 November 2026

Managerial record by team and tenure
| Team | Nat. | From | To | Record | | | | | Ref. |
| Team | Nat. | From | To | G | W | D | L | Win % | Ref. |
|---|---|---|---|---|---|---|---|---|---|
| Akhaa Ahli Aley | (Lebanon) | 25 October 2022 | 12 November 2023 | 14 | 3 | 4 | 7 | 21.43 | |
| Al Nasr Salalah | (Oman) | 4 December 2025 | 31 May 2026 | 21 | 13 | 4 | 4 | 61.90 | |
| Negeri Sembilan | (Malaysia) | 26 June 2026 | Present | 8 | 1 | 2 | 5 | 12.50 | |
| Career Total | | | | 43 | 17 | 10 | 16 | 39.53 | |

== Honours ==
=== Assistant coach ===
Ahed

- AFC Cup: 2019
- Lebanese Super Cup: 2019

Nejmeh

- Lebanese Elite Cup: 2021

Al-Hilal

- Sudan Premier League: 2021–22

Modern Sport FC

- Egyptian Super Cup runners-up: 2023–24
