= Safwan Mazlan =

Malaysian footballer (born 2002)

Personal information
- Full name: Muhammad Safwan bin Mazlan
- Date of birth: 24 January 2002 (age 24)
- Place of birth: Batu Rakit, Kuala Nerus, Malaysia
- Height: 1.81 m (5 ft 11 in)
- Positions: Centre-back; left-back

Team information
- Current team: Terengganu
- Number: 24

Youth career
- Bukit Nenas Sports School
- 2020: Terengganu IV
- 2021: FAM-MSN Project

Senior career*
Years	Team	Apps	(Gls)
2022	Terengganu II	12	(0)
2023–	Terengganu	40	(3)

International career^{‡}
2022–	Malaysia U23	5	(1)
2024–	Malaysia	5	(0)
Medal record
Men's football
Representing Malaysia
Malaysia U-22
Merlion Cup
Winner	2023
Malaysia
Merdeka Tournament
Winner	2024
- * Club domestic league appearances and goals as of 20 April 2025 ‡ National team caps and goals as of 17 November 2026

Muhammad Safwan bin Mazlan (born 24 January 2002) is a Malaysian professional footballer who plays primarily as a centre-back or a left-back for Malaysia Super League club Terengganu and the Malaysia national team.

== International career ==
=== Youth ===
In March 2023, Safwan participated in the 2023 Merlion Cup campaign held in Singapore. He successfully led Malaysia U22 and scored the second goal for Malaysia U22 in the final match against Hong Kong U23 in the 78th minute to become the Merlion Cup champion.

The result ended with a 2–1 victory for Malaysia U22 and it made history for the first time after winning the tournament.

=== Senior ===
Safwan made his debut for the Malaysia national team on 6 June 2024 in a 2026 FIFA World Cup qualifier against Kyrgyzstan at the Dolen Omurzakov Stadium. He played the full match as it ended in a 1–1 draw.

In September 2024, Safwan was listed in the 2024 Merdeka Tournament. In the tournament, Malaysia successfully won the championship for the 13th time by defeating Lebanon with a score of 1–0 in the final. It was Safwan's first trophy with the national squad.

== Career statistics ==
=== Club ===
As of match played 24 April 2025

Club	Season	League			Cup		League Cup		Continental		Total	
Club	Season	Division	Apps	Goals	Apps	Goals	Apps	Goals	Apps	Goals	Apps	Goals
Terengganu II	2022	Malaysia Premier League	12	0	–		–		–		12	0
Terengganu II	Total		12	0	0	0	0	0	0	0	12	0
Terengganu	2023	Malaysia Super League	18	1	2	0	5	0	3 (Note: One Appearances in AFC Cup)	0	28	1
Terengganu	2024–25	Malaysia Super League	22	2	5	0	6	0	4	0	37	2
Terengganu	2025–26	Malaysia Super League	0	0	0	0	0	0	0	0	0	0
Terengganu	Total		40	3	7	0	11	0	7	0	65	3
Career total			52	3	7	0	11	0	7	0	77	3

=== International ===
As of 18 November 2024

National team	Year	Apps	Goals
Malaysia
Malaysia	2024	3	0
Total		3	0

== Honours ==
Malaysia

- Merdeka Tournament: 2024

Malaysia U22

- Merlion Cup: 2023

Terengganu FC

- Malaysia Cup runner-up: 2023
- Malaysia Charity Shield runner-up: 2023
