= Syed Nasrulhaq =

Malaysian professional footballer

Personal information
- Full name: Syed Muhammad Nasrulhaq bin Syed Bidin
- Date of birth: 6 March 1999 (age 27)
- Place of birth: Kuala Nerus, Malaysia
- Height: 1.81 m (5 ft 11 in)
- Position: Goalkeeper

Team information
- Current team: Terengganu
- Number: 29

Youth career
- 2020: Terengganu II

Senior career*
Years	Team	Apps	(Gls)
2021–	Terengganu	12	(0)
2022	→ Terengganu II (loan)	22	(0)

International career^{‡}
2021–2022	Malaysia U23	1	(0)
- * Club domestic league appearances and goals as of 26 May 2025 ‡ National team caps and goals as of 20 May 2025

Syed Muhammad Nasrulhaq bin Syed Bidin (born 6 March 1999) is a Malaysian professional footballer who plays as a goalkeeper for Malaysia Super League club Terengganu and the Malaysia national team.

== Early life ==
Syed Nasrulhaq was born in Kampung Bukit Tunggal, Kuala Nerus, Terengganu.

== Club career ==
=== Terengganu ===
Syed Nasrulhaq joined Terengganu in December 2021 but later sent to play for Terengganu II. Initially as a backup goalkeeper, he rose through the ranks and became the first-choice goalkeeper for the 2024 season. His breakout performances came during the Malaysia Super League and domestic cup competitions in 2024.

He made his league debut in 2023 and appeared in key fixtures, including Malaysia FA Cup and Malaysia Cup matches. His performances, including clean sheets and high save percentages, have established him as one of the promising goalkeepers in Malaysian football.

In 2023–24 season, he made a debut in the AFC Champions League Two.

== International career ==
=== Malaysia U23 ===
Syed Nasrulhaq has represented Malaysia at the under-23 level. He participated in the 2022 AFF U-23 Championship, where he was listed among the top goalkeepers of the tournament. On 21 February 2022, he made his national team debut in AFF U-23 Championship up against Laos U23.

=== Malaysia ===
In May 2025, Syed Nasrulhaq received his senior national team call-up for Malaysia. While he has yet to make his debut, his inclusion in the squad reflects his strong performances at the club level for Terengganu.

== Career statistics ==
=== Club ===
As of match played 30 May 2025

Appearances and goals by club, season and competition
Club	Season	League (Note: Including Malaysia Charity Shield)			Cup		League Cup		Continental (Note: Including AFC Cup, AFC Champions League, and ASEAN Club Championship)		Total	
Club	Season	Division	Apps	Goals	Apps	Goals	Apps	Goals	Apps	Goals	Apps	Goals
Terengganu	2022	Malaysia Super League	0	0	0	0	0	0	0	0	0	0
Terengganu	2023	Malaysia Super League	1	0	0	0	1	0	1	0	3	0
Terengganu	2024–25	Malaysia Super League	11	0	4	0	1	0	0	0	15	0
Terengganu	Total		0	0	0	0	0	0	0	0	0	0
Career total			0	0	0	0	0	0	0	0	0	0

== Honours ==
=== Terengganu ===
- Malaysia Super League runner up: 2022
- Malaysia FA Cup runner up: 2022
- Malaysia Cup runner up: 2023
