= Philippines v Tajikistan (2019 AFC Asian Cup qualification) =

2019 AFC Asian Cup qualification match between the Philippines and Tajikistan

2019 AFC Asian Cup qualification Group F
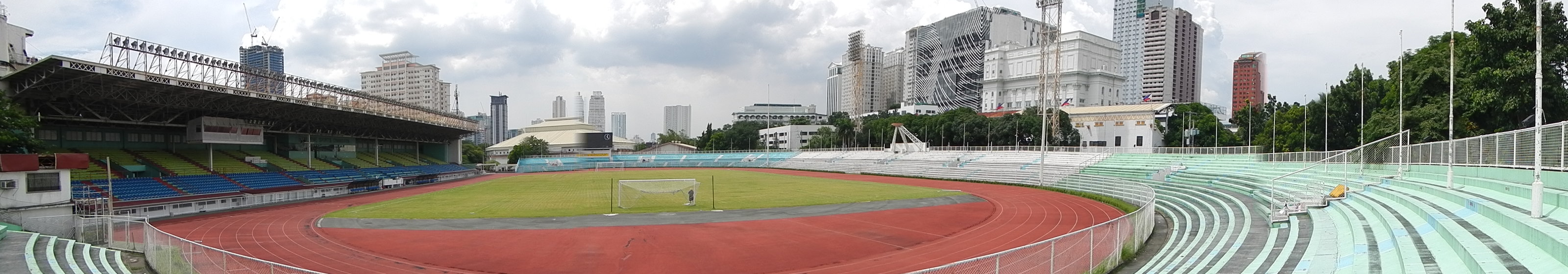
- The Rizal Memorial Stadium hosted the match
- Event: 2019 AFC Asian Cup qualification
Philippines	Tajikistan
(Philippines)	(Tajikistan)
2	1
- Date: 27 March 2018
- Venue: Rizal Memorial Stadium, Manila
- Referee: Jarred Gillett (Australia)
- Attendance: 4,671

On 27 March 2018, a 2019 AFC Asian Cup qualification match was played between the Philippines and Tajikistan at the Rizal Memorial Stadium.
