= Nurillo Tukhtasinov =

Uzbekistani footballer

Personal information
- Date of birth: 19 February 1997 (age 29)
- Place of birth: Izboskan, Andijan Region, Uzbekistan
- Height: 1.72 m (5 ft 8 in)
- Position: Midfielder

Team information
- Current team: Dinamo Samarqand
- Number: 4

Senior career*
Years	Team	Apps	(Gls)
2016-2017	Bunyodkor	25	(1)
2018	Sogdiana Jizzakh	19	(0)
2019–2021	Bunyodkor	79	(22)
2022	Navbahor Namangan	16	(0)
2023	Neftchi Fergana	13	(3)
2024–2025	Terengganu	44	(9)
2026–	Dinamo Samarqand	12	(2)

International career
2015-2016	Uzbekistan U19	6	(1)
2018	Uzbekistan U21	3	(0)
2018	Uzbekistan U23	20	(4)
2020	Uzbekistan	1	(0)
- * Club domestic league appearances and goals as of 28 July 2026

Nurillo Tukhtasinov (born 19 February 1997) is an Uzbek professional footballer who plays as a midfielder for Dinamo Samarqand.

== Club career ==
=== Sogdiyona Jizzakh ===
On 12 February 2018, Tukhtasinov signed a one-year contract with Sogdiyona Jizzakh.

=== Bunyodkor Tashkent ===
On 1 February 2019, Tukhtasinov signed a three-year contract with Bunyodkor Tashkent. Tukhtasinov scored his first goal for the club on 25 May in a 2–0 win over Metallurg Bekabad in the Uzbekistan Super League.

=== Navbahor Namangan ===
On 1 January 2022, Tukhtasinov signed a one-year contract with Navbahor Namangan.

=== Neftchi Fergana ===
On 1 November 2023, Tukhtasinov signed with FC Neftchi Fergana.

=== Terengganu ===
On 10 July 2023, Tukhtasinov signed with Malaysia Football League side Terengganu. He made his debut for the club on 16 July in a 0–0 draw against PDRM FC. He scored his first league goal for the club on 14 August in an 8–0 win over Kelantan.On 27 November 2024, Tukhtasinov officially signed an extended contract to stay with club until December next year 2025.

== Honours ==
Navbahor Namangan

- Uzbek Cup runner-up: 2022

Terengganu

- Malaysia Cup runner-up: 2023
