= Rahadiazli Rahalim =

Malaysian footballer

Personal information
- Full name: Muhammad Rahadiazli bin Rahalim
- Date of birth: 28 May 2001 (age 25)
- Place of birth: Kuala Terengganu, Malaysia
- Height: 1.92 m (6 ft 4 in)
- Position: Goalkeeper

Team information
- Current team: Terengganu
- Number: 1

Youth career
- 2019: Terengganu IV

Senior career*
Years	Team	Apps	(Gls)
2020–	Terengganu	32	(0)

International career^{‡}
2022–2024	Malaysia U23	1	(0)
2022–	Malaysia	1	(0)
- * Club domestic league appearances and goals as of 1 June 2025 ‡ National team caps and goals as of 24 December 2022

Muhammad Rahadiazli bin Rahalim (Jawi: محمد رهادي عزلي بن رحليم, IPA: [muhammad rahadɪazlɪ bɪn rahalɪm]; born 28 May 2001) is a Malaysian professional footballer who plays as a goalkeeper for Malaysia Super League club Terengganu and the Malaysia national team.

== Club career ==
=== 2021 season ===
Rahadiazli Rahalim is a Terengganu FC Academy product. He is known for his height and physical ability. He made his Malaysia Super League debut in 2–1 win against Selangor in 2021. He joined the Terengganu starting eleven after chances given by head coach Nafuzi Zain. He suffered an ACL injury that ended his season.

=== 2022 season ===
After his rehabilitation finished in late 2021, he started training with the first team again. Rahadiazli made his comeback from injury against Selangor in a preseason 2–0 win. Rahadiazli return to league play against Johor Darul Ta'zim.

== International career ==
=== Under 23 ===
Rahadiazli received a callup and listed among 31 players ahead of SEA Games in Vietnam by Under-23 headcoach Brad Maloney.

=== Senior team ===
After his performance in the league, he received a national callup for the senior team from former headcoach Tan Cheng Hoe in March 2021. He received another senior callup in March 2022, ahead of friendlies against Philippines and Singapore from new headcoach Kim Pan Gon, but tested positive for COVID-19.

In September 2022, he received another call up for the King's Cup in Thailand.

== Career statistics ==
=== Club ===
As of match played 19 April 2025

Appearances and goals by club, season and competition
Club	Season	League (Note: Including Malaysia Charity Shield)			Cup		League Cup		Continental (Note: Including AFC Cup and AFC Champions League)		Total	
Club	Season	Division	Apps	Goals	Apps	Goals	Apps	Goals	Apps	Goals	Apps	Goals
Terengganu	2020	Malaysia Super League	5	0	–		–		–		5	0
Terengganu	2021	Malaysia Super League	5	0	–		0	0	–		5	0
Terengganu	2022	Malaysia Super League	9	0	4	0	2	0	–		15	0
Terengganu	2023	Malaysia Super League	7	0	1	0	1	0	0	0	9	0
Terengganu	2024–25	Malaysia Super League	6	0	0	0	5	0	3	0	14	0
Terengganu	Total		32	0	5	0	8	0	3	0	48	0
Career total			32	0	5	0	8	0	3	0	48	0

=== International ===
As of match played 24 December 2022

Malaysia
Year	Apps	Goals
2022	1	0
Total	1	0

== Honours ==
Terengganu IV

- Malaysia Youth Cup: 2019

Terengganu

- Malaysia Super League runner-up: 2022
- Malaysia FA Cup runner-up: 2022
- Malaysia Cup runner-up: 2023

Malaysia U22

- Merlion Cup: 2023

Malaysia U23

- ASEAN U-23 Championship 4th Place: 2023

Malaysia

- King's Cup runner-up: 2022
