= Manny Ott =

Filipino footballer (born 1992)

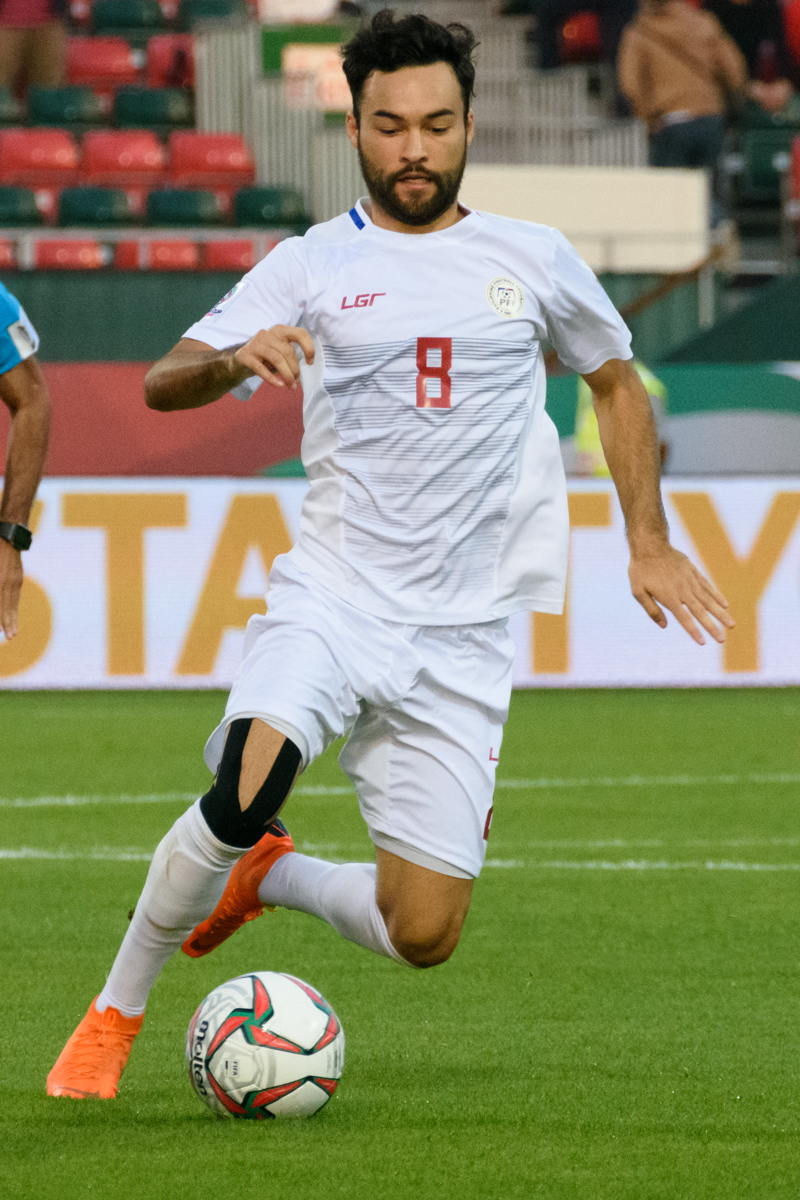
- Ott playing for Philippines at the 2019 AFC Asian Cup

Personal information
- Full name: Manuel Gelito Ott
- Date of birth: 6 May 1992 (age 34)
- Place of birth: Munich, Germany
- Height: 1.72 m (5 ft 8 in)
- Position: Midfielder

Team information
- Current team: Rayong
- Number: 88

Youth career
- FSV Ilmmünster
- FSV Pfaffenhofen
- 2009: 1860 Munich
- 2009–2010: FC Ingolstadt 04

Senior career*
Years	Team	Apps	(Gls)
2010–2014	FC Ingolstadt 04 II	74	(7)
2014–2018	Ceres–Negros		
2019–2020	Ratchaburi Mitr Phol	2	(0)
2020	Ceres–Negros / United City	4	(1)
2021	Melaka United	22	(2)
2022	Terengganu	21	(5)
2023	Kedah Darul Aman	23	(3)
2024–2025	Terengganu	22	(4)
2024–	Rayong	18	(1)

International career^{‡}
2009	Philippines U19	4	(0)
2011	Philippines U23	4	(2)
2010–	Philippines	73	(4)
Medal record
Men's football
Representing Philippines
AFC Challenge Cup
Silver medal – second place	2014 Maldives
Bronze medal – third place	2012 Nepal
- * Club domestic league appearances and goals as of 13:27, 5 October 2024 (UTC) ‡ National team caps and goals as of 10:28; 2 October 2026 (UTC+8)

Manuel Gelito Ott (born 6 May 1992) is a professional footballer who plays as a midfielder for Thai League 1 club Rayong. Born in Germany, he captains the Philippines national team.

He started his professional career in Germany, where he was raised, with the second team of Ingolstadt. He then had two spells with Filipino club Ceres/United City where he won four league titles.

At international level, he represents the Philippines, for whom he is eligible through his mother. He has taken part in the Southeast Asian Games, AFF Championship, FIFA ASEAN Cup, and AFC Asian Cup. His younger brother Mike is also a footballer and has been his teammate for both club and country.

== Club career ==
Born in Munich, Ott had his youth career at SV Ilmmünster, FSV Pfaffenhofen, and TSV 1860 Munich before joining FC Ingolstadt II in 2009. In July 2014, Ott was signed by Ceres of the United Football League (UFL), the de facto top level in the Philippines. Ceres finished as runners-up of the 2015 UFL Cup, although Ott missed the final due to suspension after accumulating two yellow cards. That year, Ceres also won UFL Division 1. In the 2016 UFL Cup, he played in the final where they lost 3–1 to Global. Ceres finished second in that year's UFL. In their last match of the season, against JP Voltes, Ott received a red card for disrespecting the referee.

In the 2017 AFC Cup group stage, Ott contributed a goal in Ceres' 5–0 home thrashing of Tampines Rovers. In the ASEAN zonal final, he sealed their 3–2 aggregate win over Home United by scoring the winning goal in the second leg which ended 2–0. He featured in the Inter-zone play-off semifinal, where they were eliminated by Istiklol. In the domestic level, the UFL was replaced by the Philippines Football League (PFL) as the official top tier division. Ceres–Negros won the league's inaugural title.

In the 2018 preseason, his brother Mike was signed by Ceres–Negros. In the AFC Cup group stage, Ott contributed a goal in their 9–0 thrashing of Boeung Ket, one of the biggest wins in the tournament's history. He later scored against Yangon United in the second leg of the ASEAN zonal semifinal. Despite losing the match, Ceres won the tie 6–5 on aggregate. The Ott brothers did not feature in the second leg of the ASEAN zonal final due to yellow cards from previous games. In a rematch with Home United, Ceres lost 3–1 on aggregate. For their PFL opening match, the Ott brothers scored a goal each as Ceres defeated Kaya–Iloilo 2–1. Ceres–Negros went on to defend their league title.

In January 2019, Ott joined Ratchaburi Mitr Phol in the Thai League 1. However, in February, he sustained a shin injury during preseason training and was expected to be sidelined for three months. As of August, he remained sidelined. On 2 October, Ott made his Thai League 1 debut entering as a second-half substitute for compatriot Amin Nazari in a 2–2 draw with Sukhothai. On 20 October, he started in Ratchaburi's home match against Bangkok United which also ended in a 2–2 draw.

Ott re-joined Ceres–Negros on 6 February 2020. On 11 February, he started in Ceres' first AFC Cup match of the season against Cambodian champions Svay Rieng. As Ott was dribbling towards the goal, his teammate Bienve Marañón stole the ball and scored the third goal in their 4–0 win. He was credited with an assist for the play. When Ceres–Negros became United City after an ownership change in mid-2020, the Ott brothers were re-signed by the new owners. In their last PFL match of the season, he scored the consolation goal in their 2–1 loss to Kaya–Iloilo, the club's first domestic defeat in two years. Nonetheless, United City won the 2020 PFL. In December 2020, United City announced that Ott transferred to a Malaysian club.

Malaysia Super League club Melaka United announced the signing of Ott in January 2021.

He signed with Terengganu for the 2022 season, and Kedah Darul Aman for the 2023 season.

He rejoined Terengganu for the 2024 season.

== International career ==
In 2010, a scout tasked to find eligible players in Europe for the Philippine national team invited Ott for a trial training camp in Taiwan. At that time, Ott was unaware that the Philippines had a national football team. He made his international debut for the Philippines on 16 January 2010 against Chinese Taipei. He played 60 minutes in a goalless draw. In June to July 2011, he featured in the 2014 FIFA World Cup qualifiers where they beat Sri Lanka but were eliminated by Kuwait. In December that year, he played in the 6–1 friendly defeat to LA Galaxy which featured David Beckham.

He was a late addition in the Philippines U23 squad for the 2011 Southeast Asian Games after initially backing out due to other commitments. In their opening match, he scored Philippines' only goal in the 3–1 defeat to Vietnam. He then scored the opening goal in their 3–2 win over Laos, the Philippines' only win in the campaign.

Ott scored his first senior international goal in a 3–0 friendly win over Cambodia on 14 November 2014. Two weeks later, in the 2014 AFF Championship, he contributed a goal in Philippines' first-ever win over Indonesia. Philippines reached the semi-finals of the tournament.

In 2015 and 2016, he played in the qualifying matches for the 2018 FIFA World Cup and 2019 AFC Asian Cup. In one such match, on 29 March 2016, he scored against North Korea in a 3–2 win. On 7 October, Ott and his brother Mike played their first international match together as the latter scored on his debut in a 3–1 friendly loss to Bahrain. In November, the Ott brothers featured in the 2016 AFF Championship but the team failed to clear the group stage.

In 2017 and 2018, Ott featured in the third round of qualifiers for the 2019 Asian Cup. Their 2–1 win over Tajikistan on 27 March 2018 sealed their qualification for their first-ever Asian Cup campaign. Ott also played in the 2018 AFF Championship. However, due to injury, he missed the second leg of the semi-finals in which Vietnam eliminated the Philippines.

The 2019 AFC Asian Cup was Philippines' first-ever appearance in the tournament. Ott played in all three matches of their winless campaign.

=== International goals ===
Scores and results list the Philippines' goal tally first, score column indicates score after each Ott goal.

List of international goals scored by Manuel Ott
No.	Date	Venue	Opponent	Score	Result	Competition	Ref.
1	14 November 2014	Rizal Memorial Stadium, Manila	Cambodia	2–0	3–0	Friendly	
2	25 November 2014	Mỹ Đình National Stadium, Hanoi	Indonesia	2–0	4–0	2014 AFF Suzuki Cup	
3	30 March 2015	Bahrain National Stadium, Riffa, Bahrain	Bahrain	1–2	1–2	Friendly	
4	29 March 2016	Rizal Memorial Stadium, Manila	North Korea	2–2	3–2	2018 FIFA World Cup qualifier	

== Personal life ==
Ott was born to a German father and a Filipina mother from Boracay. He has two younger brothers, twins Mike and Marco. The Ott brothers grew up in Pfaffenhofen, Germany though they visited their mother's homeland almost annually. Manuel settled in the Philippines in 2014 and Mike followed in 2017. Ott is also known as "Manny".

== Honours ==
Ceres–Negros / United City

- Philippines Football League: 2017, 2018, 2020
- United Football League: 2015
- United Football League Cup runner-up: 2015, 2016
