= Gabriel Silva (footballer, born 1997) =

Brazilian footballer

Personal information
- Full name: Gabriel Silva Costa
- Date of birth: 8 April 1997 (age 29)
- Place of birth: Rio de Janeiro, Brazil
- Height: 1.69 m (5 ft 7 in)
- Position: Forward

Team information
- Current team: Arema
- Number: 7

Youth career
- 2017–2019: Flamengo
- 2019–2021: Corinthians

Senior career*
Years	Team	Apps	(Gls)
2017–2019	Flamengo	0	(0)
2017–2018	→ Veranópolis (loan)	6	(1)
2018	→ Tupi (loan)	2	(0)
2021	Volta Redonda	3	(0)
2022–2023	Angkor Tiger	19	(11)
2023–2025	Svay Rieng	51	(15)
2025	Terengganu	11	(3)
2026–	Arema	27	(7)
- * Club domestic league appearances and goals as of 20 November 2026

Gabriel Silva Costa (born 8 April 1997), simply known as Gabi, is a Brazilian professional footballer who plays as a forward for Super League club Arema.

== Honours ==
Svay Rieng

- Cambodian Premier League: 2023–24, 2024–25
- Hun Sen Cup: 2023–24
