= 2022 Negeri Sembilan FC season =

Negeri Sembilan
2022 season
- President: Razman al-Qadri
- Head Coach: K. Devan
- Stadium: Tuanku Abdul Rahman Stadium
- Malaysia Super League: 4th
- Malaysia Cup: Quarter-finals
- Malaysia FA Cup: First round
- Top goalscorer: League: (11 goals); Gustavo; All: (11 goals); Gustavo
- Highest home attendance: 22224
- Lowest home attendance: 1898
Home colours	Away colours	Third colours

The 2022 season in the Malaysia Super League was Negeri Sembilan's 10th season, while 99th year of its foundation. Since its establishment in 1923, Negeri Sembilan has won the Malaysia Cup several times. It has won the cup in 1948, 2009, and 2011. Along with the league, the club has also competed in the Malaysia Cup and Malaysia FA Cup in 2022.

== Events ==
In December 2021, the club signed several new players. Among them were K. Sarkunan, Syihan Hazmi, Hérold Goulon, Matheus Alves, David Mawutor, Khuzaimi Pie, A. Namathevan, Izzuddin Roslan, Khair Jones, Che Rashid Che Halim, Sean Selvaraj, Gustavo, Izaffiq Ruzi, Hariz Kamarudin, Omid Nazari and Kossi Adetu.

Negeri Sembilan FC performed brilliantly by successfully creating an unbeaten record throughout the 6 Malaysia Super League games since the league was started. Negeri Sembilan FC managed to be at the top of the league for a week. However, on 11 May 2022, their clean sheet was broken by the Johor Darul Ta'zim FC team after the Negeri Sembilan FC team was defeated with a result of 1–0.

On 13 June 2022, two foreign players, David Mawutor and Kossi Adetu were replaced with Gustavo and Yashir Pinto during mid season transfer.

== Players ==
=== Current squad ===
As of 1 August 2022

Note: Flags indicate national team as defined under FIFA eligibility rules; some limited exceptions apply. Players may hold more than one non-FIFA nationality.

No.	Pos.	Nation	Player
1	GK	MAS	Muhaimin Mohamad
2	DF	MAS	Che Rashid Che Halim (on loan from Johor Darul Ta'zim F.C.)
3	DF	MAS	Khair Jones
4	DF	FRA	Herold Goulon
5	DF	MAS	Annas Rahmat
6	MF	MAS	K. Sarkunan (on loan from Selangor F.C.)
7	MF	MAS	Sean Selvaraj
8	FW	MAS	Zaquan Adha (captain)
10	MF	PHI	Omid Nazari
11	FW	BRA	Matheus Alves
12	GK	MAS	Kaharuddin Rahman
15	MF	MAS	Hariz Kamarudin
16	MF	MAS	Selvan Anbualagan
17	DF	MAS	Nasrullah Haniff (Vice-captain)
18	DF	MAS	Khuzaimi Piee

No.	Pos.	Nation	Player
19	FW	MAS	Javabilaarivin Nyanasegar
22	GK	MAS	Syihan Hazmi
23	DF	MAS	Izaffiq Ruzi
24	MF	MAS	Saiful Ridzuwan
25	MF	MAS	Adib Faris
26	DF	MAS	A. Namathevan
27	MF	MAS	Fahmi Faizal
30	DF	MAS	Zamri Pin Ramli
33	FW	MAS	Amirul Hakimi Rosli
36	MF	PLE	Yashir Pinto
44	MF	MAS	Afiq Fitri
70	FW	BRA	Gustavo
72	DF	MAS	Zulkhairi Zulkeply
88	MF	MAS	Izzuddin Roslan

== Transfers ==
=== In pre-season ===
Note: Flags indicate national team as defined under FIFA eligibility rules; some limited exceptions apply. Players may hold more than one non-FIFA nationality.

No.	Pos.	Nation	Player
2	DF	MAS	Che Rashid Che Halim (on loan from Johor Darul Ta'zim)
3	DF	MAS	Khair Jones (from Sarawak United FC)
4	DF	FRA	Herold Goulon (from Sri Pahang FC)
6	MF	MAS	K. Sarkunan (on loan from Selangor FC)
10	MF	PHI	Omid Nazari (from United City F.C.)
11	FW	BRA	Matheus Alves (from Chungnam Asan FC)
14	MF	GHA	David Mawutor (from FC Shakhter Karagandy)
15	MF	MAS	Hariz Kamarudin (from Kelantan United F.C.)

No.	Pos.	Nation	Player
18	DF	MAS	Khuzaimi Piee (from UiTM FC)
20	FW	TOG	Kossi Adetu (from Magusa T.G.S.K)
22	GK	MAS	Syihan Hazmi (from Petaling Jaya City)
23	DF	MAS	Izaffiq Ruzi (from Kelantan F.C.)
26	DF	MAS	A. Namathevan (from Selangor FC)

=== In mid-season ===
Note: Flags indicate national team as defined under FIFA eligibility rules; some limited exceptions apply. Players may hold more than one non-FIFA nationality.

No.	Pos.	Nation	Player
36	MF	PLE	Yashir Pinto (from Khon Kaen United F.C.)
70	FW	BRA	Gustavo (from Clube Náutico Capibaribe)

=== Out pre-season ===
Note: Flags indicate national team as defined under FIFA eligibility rules; some limited exceptions apply. Players may hold more than one non-FIFA nationality.

No.	Pos.	Nation	Player
2	DF	MAS	Aroon Kumar (to Petaling Jaya City FC)
3	DF	MAS	Tasnim Fitri (to Sarawak United F.C.)
6	MF	MAS	Halim Zainal (to Free agent)
7	MF	KOR	Bae Beom-geun (to Gyeongnam FC)
9	FW	TOG	Francis Koné (to Sarawak United F.C.)
11	MF	MAS	Alif Romli
12	MF	MAS	Barathkumar Ramaloo (to Petaling Jaya City FC)
14	FW	CMR	Alain Akono (to SCC Mohammédia)

No.	Pos.	Nation	Player
18	DS	MAS	Osman Yusoff (to Kelantan FC)
21	DF	MAS	Raja Imran Shah (to Sarawak United F.C.)
22	GK	MAS	Damien Lim (to Sabah F.C.)
29	MF	MAS	Deevan Raj (to Free agent)
31	GK	MAS	Azeem Farhan (to Free agent)
44	DF	BRA	Arthur Cunha (to Free agent)

=== Out mid-season ===
Note: Flags indicate national team as defined under FIFA eligibility rules; some limited exceptions apply. Players may hold more than one non-FIFA nationality.

No.	Pos.	Nation	Player
14	MF	GHA	David Mawutor (to Free agent)
20	FW	TOG	Kossi Adetu (to Free agent)

== Competitions ==
=== Malaysia Premier League ===
==== League table ====
Pos	Team	Pld	W	D	L	GF	GA	GD	Pts	Qualification or relegation
2	Terengganu	22	14	2	6	39	20	+19	44	Qualification for AFC Cup group stage
3	Sabah	22	13	3	6	36	26	+10	42	Qualification for AFC Cup group stage
4	Negeri Sembilan	22	12	5	5	33	26	+7	41	
5	Selangor	22	8	6	8	39	33	+6	30	
6	Kuala Lumpur City	22	8	5	9	30	31	−1	29	

Updated to match(es) played on unknown. Source: MFL
Rules for classification: 1) Points; 2) Goal difference; 3) Number of goals scored.

==== Results by round ====
Round	1	2	3	4	5	6	7	8	9	10	11	12	13	14	15	16	17	18	19	20	21	22
Ground	A	H	A	H	H	A	H	A	A	H	A	H	H	A	H	A	A	H	H	A	H	A
Result	W	D	D	W	W	W	L	D	D	W	D	L	W	W	W	W	L	W	W	L	W	L
Position	3	4	5	6	4	4	1	2	3	3	2	3	3	3	3	3	3	3	4	4	4	4

Updated to match(es) played on 21 September 2022. Source: MSL
A = Away; H = Home; W = Win; D = Draw; L = Loss

==== Matches ====
Win Draw Loss Fixtures

4 March 2022 1	Sabah F.C.	0–1	Negeri Sembilan FC	Kota Kinabalu
19:30 UTC+8		Report	Khair 52'	Stadium: Likas Stadium; Attendance: 2,343; Referee: Zulkarnain Zakaria

5 April 2022 2	Negeri Sembilan FC	2–2	Selangor F.C.	Paroi
22:00 UTC+8	Goulon 58'; Adetu 76'	Report	Nasrullah 35' (o.g.); Caion 50'	Stadium: Tuanku Abdul Rahman Stadium; Attendance: 2,230; Referee: Hamdan Awang

9 April 2022 3	Penang F.C.	1–1	Negeri Sembilan FC	Penang
22:00 UTC+8	El-Helwe 39' (pen.)	Report	Zaquan 33' (pen.)	Stadium: City Stadium; Attendance: 1,126; Referee: Zulkarnain Zakaria

16 April 2022 4	Negeri Sembilan FC	3–1	Petaling Jaya City FC	Paroi
22:00 UTC+8	Goulon 45+1' (pen.); Selvaraj 81'; Alves 86'	Report	Lok 28'	Stadium: Tuanku Abdul Rahman Stadium; Attendance: 1,898; Referee: Fitri Maskon

24 April 2022 5	Negeri Sembilan FC	2–1	Kuala Lumpur City F.C.	Paroi
22:00 UTC+8	Goulon 47', 76'	Report	Selvaraj 75' (o.g.)	Stadium: Tuanku Abdul Rahman Stadium; Attendance: 2,063; Referee: Zamzaidi Katimin

6 May 2022 6	Sarawak United FC	1–2	Negeri Sembilan FC	Kuching
20:15 UTC+8	Kok 51'	Report	Goulon 64' (pen.); Alves 69'	Stadium: Sarawak State Stadium; Attendance: 443; Referee: Hamdan Awang

11 May 2022 7	Negeri Sembilan FC	0–1	Johor Darul Ta'zim F.C.	Paroi
21:00 UTC+8		Report	Forestieri 90+10'	Stadium: Tuanku Abdul Rahman Stadium; Attendance: 22,224; Referee: Nazmi Nasaruddin

17 May 2022 8	Kedah Darul Aman F.C.	0–0	Negeri Sembilan FC	Alor Setar
21:00 UTC+8		Report		Stadium: Darul Aman Stadium; Attendance: 3,495; Referee: Fusser Mad Sallih

18 June 2022 9	Melaka United F.C.	0–0	Negeri Sembilan FC	Krubong
20:15 UTC+8		Report		Stadium: Hang Jebat Stadium; Attendance: 4,105; Referee: Tuan Mohd Yaasin Tuan Mohd Hanafiah

25 June 2022 10	Negeri Sembilan FC	3–0	Sri Pahang FC	Paroi
20:15 UTC+8	Gustavo 35'; Islame 48'; Alves 53'	Report		Stadium: Tuanku Abdul Rahman Stadium; Attendance: 6,454; Referee: Fusser Mad Sallih

29 June 2022 11	Terengganu FC	0–0	Negeri Sembilan FC	Kuala Terengganu
21:00 UTC+8		Report		Stadium: Sultan Mizan Zainal Abidin Stadium; Attendance: 4,500; Referee: Zamzaidi Katimin

3 July 2022 12	Negeri Sembilan FC	0–1	Sabah F.C.	Paroi
20:15 UTC+8		Report	Park	Stadium: Tuanku Abdul Rahman Stadium; Attendance: 8,957++ Referee: Mohd Amirul Izwan Yaacob

27 July 2022 13	Negeri Sembilan FC	2–1	Terengganu FC	Paroi
21:00 UTC+8	Gustavo 17'; Islame 52'	Report	Tchétché 19'	Stadium: Tuanku Abdul Rahman Stadium; Attendance: 5,339; Referee: S. Logeswaran

31 July 2022 14	Selangor F.C.	2–3	Negeri Sembilan FC	Petaling Jaya
21:00 UTC+8	Caion 9'; Yazan 30'	Report	Gustavo 66', 80'; Sean Selvaraj 88'	Stadium: Petaling Jaya Stadium; Attendance: 2,452; Referee: Fitri Maskon

9 August 2022 15	Negeri Sembilan FC	3–2	Penang F.C.	Paroi
21:00 UTC+8	Zamri 35'; Alves 59'; Goulon 85'	Report	Lucas Silva 27'; T. Saravanan 81'	Stadium: Tuanku Abdul Rahman Stadium; Attendance: 5,467; Referee: Zamzaidi Katitmin

13 August 2022 16	Petaling Jaya City FC	0–2	Negeri Sembilan FC	Petaling Jaya
21:00 UTC+8		Report	Gustavo 11', 62'	Stadium: Petaling Jaya Stadium; Attendance: 1,113; Referee: Mohd Amirul Izwan Yaacob

18 August 2022 17	Kuala Lumpur City F.C.	1–0	Negeri Sembilan FC	Cheras
20:15 UTC+8	Paulo Josué 45+1'	Report		Stadium: Kuala Lumpur Stadium; Attendance: 1,905; Referee: Mohd Nafeez Abd Wahab

9 September 2022 18	Negeri Sembilan FC	3–2	Sarawak United FC	Paroi
20:15 UTC+8	Gustavo 17', 67'; Alves 80'	Report	Raja Imran Shah 30'; Shamie 86'	Stadium: Tuanku Abdul Rahman Stadium; Attendance: 3,335; Referee: Zamzaidi Katimin

8 October 2022 19	Negeri Sembilan FC	4–3	Kedah Darul Aman F.C.	Paroi
20:15 UTC+8	Alves 25'; Gustavo 58', 70'; Selvaraj 66'	Report	Al-Mardi 45+3'; Dechmitr 82'; Vales 90'	Stadium: Tuanku Abdul Rahman Stadium; Attendance: 6,391; Referee: Zamzaidi Katimin

1 October 2022 20	Johor Darul Ta'zim F.C.	5–0	Negeri Sembilan FC	Iskandar Puteri
20:15 UTC+8	Arif 35', 49'; Velázquez 38'; Bergson 61', 88'	Report		Stadium: Sultan Ibrahim Stadium; Attendance: 25,886; Referee: Mohd Fusser Mad Sallih

11 October 2022 21	Negeri Sembilan FC	2–0	Melaka United F.C.	Paroi
20:15 UTC+8	Nasrullah 35' Gustavo 88'	Report		Stadium: Tuanku Abdul Rahman Stadium; Attendance: 5,016; Referee: Tuan Mohd Yaasin Tuan Hanapiah

15 October 2022 22	Sri Pahang FC	2–0	Negeri Sembilan FC	Kuantan
21:00 UTC+8	Rowley 28', 47'	Report		Stadium: Darul Makmur Stadium; Attendance: 2,728; Referee: Zulkarnain Zakaria

=== Malaysia Cup ===
==== Round of 16 ====
Negeri Sembilan FC won against Kedah Darul Aman F.C. on 26 October 2022.

Team 1	Agg.	Team 2	1st leg	2nd leg
Kedah Darul Aman	1–2	Negeri Sembilan	1–2	0–0

==== Quarter-final ====
Negeri Sembilan FC lose against Selangor F.C. on 12 November 2022.

Team 1	Agg.	Team 2	1st leg	2nd leg
Selangor	4–2	Negeri Sembilan	2–0	2–2

=== Malaysia FA Cup ===
==== First round ====
The draw for the first round was held on 23 February 2022. The matches were held between 11 March and 29 April.

Negeri Sembilan FC lose against Terengganu on 29 April 2022.

29 April 2022	Terengganu FC	2–1	Negeri Sembilan FC	Kuala Terengganu
20:15 UTC+8	Herold Goulon 28' (o.g.); Faizal Abdul Halim 38'	Report	Omid Nazari 35'	Stadium: Sultan Mizan Zainal Abidin Stadium; Attendance: 5,850; Referee: Suhaizi Shukri; Man of the Match: Kpah Sherman (Terengganu)

== Statistics ==
=== Appearances and goals ===
As of 1 December 2022

No.	Pos	Nat	Player	Total		League		Malaysia Cup		Malaysia FA Cup	
No.	Pos	Nat	Player	Apps	Goals	Apps	Goals	Apps	Goals	Apps	Goals
1	GK	(Malaysia) MAS	Muhaimin Mohamad	0	0	0	0	0	0	0	0
2	DF	(Malaysia) MAS	Che Rashid Che Halim	26	1	22	0	3	1	1	0
3	DF	(Malaysia) MAS	Khair Jones	15	1	14	1	0	0	1	0
4	DF	(France) FRA	Herold Goulon	23	6	19	6	3	0	1	0
5	DF	(Malaysia) MAS	Annas Rahmat	16	0	11	0	4	0	1	0
6	MF	(Malaysia) MAS	K. Sarkunan	0	0	0	0	0	0	0	0
7	FW	(Malaysia) MAS	Sean Selvaraj	13	2	12	2	0	0	1	0
8	FW	(Malaysia) MAS	Zaquan Adha	25	2	20	1	4	1	1	0
10	MF	(Philippines) PHI	Omid Nazari	25	1	20	0	4	0	1	1
11	FW	(Brazil) BRA	Matheus Alves	25	8	20	6	4	2	1	0
12	GK	(Malaysia) MAS	Kaharuddin Rahman	0	0	0	0	0	0	0	0
15	MF	(Malaysia) MAS	Hariz Kamarudin	16	0	12	0	4	0	0	0
16	MF	(Malaysia) MAS	Selvan Anbualagan	20	0	17	0	3	0	0	0
17	DF	(Malaysia) MAS	Nasrullah Haniff	24	1	20	1	3	0	1	0
18	DF	(Malaysia) MAS	Khuzaimi Piee	24	0	19	0	4	0	1	0
19	FW	(Malaysia) MAS	Javabilaarivin Nyanasegar	3	0	1	0	2	0	0	0
22	GK	(Malaysia) MAS	Syihan Hazmi	27	0	22	0	4	0	1	0
23	DF	(Malaysia) MAS	Izaffiq Ruzi	0	0	0	0	0	0	0	0
24	MF	(Malaysia) MAS	Saiful Ridzuwan	22	0	19	0	2	0	1	0
25	MF	(Malaysia) MAS	Adib Faris	0	0	0	0	0	0	0	0
26	DF	(Malaysia) MAS	A. Namathevan	18	0	15	0	2	0	1	0
27	MF	(Malaysia) MAS	Fahmi Faizal	1	0	1	0	0	0	0	0
30	DF	(Malaysia) MAS	Zamri Pin Ramli	24	1	20	1	4	0	0	0
33	FW	(Malaysia) MAS	Hakimi Rosli	0	0	0	0	0	0	0	0
36	MF	(Palestine) PLE	Yashir Pinto	17	2	14	2	3	0	0	0
44	MF	(Malaysia) MAS	Afiq Fitri	2	0	1	0	1	0	0	0
70	FW	(Brazil) BRA	Gustavo	14	11	13	11	1	0	0	0
72	DF	(Malaysia) MAS	Zulkhairi Zulkeply	12	0	9	0	3	0	0	0
88	MF	(Malaysia) MAS	Izzuddin Roslan	23	0	18	0	4	0	1	0
Players transferred out during the season
14	MF	(Ghana) GHA	David Mawutor	5	0	4	0	0	0	1	0
20	FW	(Togo) TOG	Kossi Adetu	7	1	6	1	0	0	1	0

=== Clean sheets ===
As of match played 1 December 2022

Rank	No.	Pos.	Player	League	Malaysia Cup	Malaysia FA Cup	Total
1	22	GK	(Malaysia) Syihan Hazmi	7	1	0	8
2	1	GK	(Malaysia) Muhaimin Mohamad	0	0	0	0
3	12	GK	(Malaysia) Kaharuddin Rahman	0	0	0	0
Totals				7	1		8
