= 2023 Negeri Sembilan FC season =

Negeri Sembilan
2023 season
- President: Tunku Syed Razman ibni al-Marhum Tunku Syed 'Idrus al-Qadri
- Head Coach: K. Devan
- Stadium: Tuanku Abdul Rahman Stadium
- Super League: 9th
- Malaysia FA Cup: Quarter-finals
- Malaysia Cup: Round of 16
- Top goalscorer: League: (6 goals); Shahrel Fikri; All: (7 goals); Shahrel Fikri & Casagrande
- Highest home attendance: 15,427 vs Johor Darul Ta'zim; 6 March 2023
- Lowest home attendance: 452 vs Kuala Lumpur; 14 May 2023
Home colours	Away colours

The 2023 season is Negeri Sembilan's 100th year in their history and 11th season in Malaysia Super League since it was first introduced in 2004. Also it was the 2nd season in the Malaysia Super League since promoted from Malaysia Premier League in 2021. Along with the league, the club also compete in the Malaysia Cup and Malaysia FA Cup in 2023.

== Events ==
On 7 January 2023, NSFC announced a new sponsor for 2023. The new sponsor is the clothing brand company Kelme. It has been informed that Kelme will sponsor NSFC for 2 years with a sponsorship value of RM1.7 million. Kelme will provide kits for the Super League, Under-23 League, President cup and Youth Cup teams starting this year.

On 8 January, the club officially announced several new signing players. Among them were Shahrel Fikri, Tauffiq Ar Rasyid Johar, Tommy Mawat Bada, Farid Nezal, Mahalli Jasuli, Sikh Izhan Nazrel, Firdaus Irman, Hafiz Ramdan, and Filemon Anyie. The club also signed brothers from Petaling Jaya City FC, Barathkumar Ramaloo and Aroon Kumar. In addition, the club retained one import player, Hérold Goulon, and added four new import players to the squad: Casagrande, Vinicius Leonel, Safuwan Baharudin, and Levy Madinda.

On March 6, 2023, Negeri Sembilan lost to JDT 7-0 at home. This defeat was witnessed by tens of thousands of NSFC fans, and it was the worst defeat of the 2023 season. The last time the team lost badly to JDT was in the 2022 season with a 5-0 defeat at Sultan Ibrahim Stadium.

On May 27, the club lost to Selangor in the FA Cup quarterfinals for 2023. The 3-1 defeat ended the club's journey in the FA Cup. The match took place at Tuanku Abdul Rahman Stadium in Paroi.

== Players ==
=== Current squad ===
As of 8 August 2023

Note: Flags indicate national team as defined under FIFA eligibility rules; some limited exceptions apply. Players may hold more than one non-FIFA nationality.

No.	Pos.	Nation	Player
1	GK	MAS	Tauffiq Ar Rasyid Johar
2	DF	MAS	Che Rashid Che Halim
3	MF	MAS	Tommy Mawat Bada
4	DF	MAS	Farid Nezal
5	DF	MAS	Annas Rahmat
6	DF	MAS	Aroon Kumar
7	FW	MAS	Sean Selvaraj
8	FW	MAS	Zaquan Adha (captain)
9	DF	FRA	Herold Goulon^{I}
10	FW	MYA	Hein Htet Aung^{S} (on loan from Selangor)
12	MF	MAS	Barathkumar Ramaloo
13	DF	MAS	Zainal Abidin Jamil
15	DF	MAS	Hariz Kamarudin
16	MF	MAS	Selvan Anbualagan^{U23}
17	DF	MAS	Nasrullah Haniff (Vice-captain)
18	FW	MAS	Mahalli Jasuli

No.	Pos.	Nation	Player
23	GK	MAS	Sikh Izhan Nazrel^{U23} (on loan from Selangor)
24	MF	MAS	Saiful Ridzuwan
27	MF	MAS	Fahmi Faizal
29	GK	MAS	Muhaimin Mohamad
30	DF	MAS	Zamri Pin Ramli
31	GK	MAS	Firdaus Irman^{U23}
32	FW	MAS	Shahrel Fikri
33	MF	MAS	Hafiz Ramdan
35	MF	MAS	Hasbullah Abu Bakar
44	MF	MAS	Afiq Fitri^{U23}
67	MF	MAS	Amirul Hakimi Rosli^{U23}
70	FW	ESP	Youssef Ezzejjari^{I}
88	MF	MAS	Izzuddin Roslan
97	MF	MAS	Filemon Anyie
99	FW	BRA	Casagrande^{I}

Remarks:
^{I} International player. ^{A} Asian player. ^{S} ASEAN player. ^{U23} Under-23 player. ^{U20} Under-20 player. ^{U18} Under-18 player.

=== Out on loan ===
Note: Flags indicate national team as defined under FIFA eligibility rules; some limited exceptions apply. Players may hold more than one non-FIFA nationality.

No.	Pos.	Nation	Player
12	GK	MAS	Kaharuddin Rahman (to KSR SAINS)
19	FW	MAS	Javabilaarivin Nyanasegar (to Immigration)
21	GK	MAS	T. Shaheeswaran (to Perak)

== Management Team ==
As of 1 July 2023

Position	Staff
Chief executive officer	(Malaysia) Satwant Singh
Chief operating officer	(Malaysia) Firdaus Bahri
Technical director	(Malaysia) Ishak Kunju
Manager	(Malaysia) Devan E. Kuppusamy
Head coach	(Malaysia) Devan E. Kuppusamy
Assistant head coach	(Malaysia) Nantha Kumar Kalliappan
Assistant coach	(Malaysia) Ahmad Osman
Goalkeeper coach	(Malaysia) Megat Amir Faisal
Fitness coach	(Malaysia) Nor Ikhmar Madarsa
Team doctor	(Malaysia) Dr. Rozaiman Ebrahim
Team doctor	(Malaysia) Dr. Zakwan Ahmad
Physiotherapist	(Malaysia) Fakhrusy Syakirin Bin Yaacob
Team admin	(Malaysia) Muhammad Adib Fikri Lukman
Media Officer	(Malaysia) Muhammad Suffi Zharith Sahar
Team security	(Malaysia) Anuar Abd Rahman
Team analyst	(Malaysia) Muhammad Aiman Danial Mat Aris
Masseur	(Malaysia) Mohd Khalid bin Mohamed Sain
Masseur	(Malaysia) Zahari Mazlan
Kitman	(Malaysia) Muhamad Firdaus Kamaruzli
Kitman	(Malaysia) Sharizal Mat Shah

== Transfers ==
=== In ===
Date	Pos.	Name	From	Fee	Ref.
8 January 2023	FW	(Malaysia) Shahrel Fikri	(Malaysia) Selangor	Free	
9 January 2023	MF	(Malaysia) Barathkumar Ramaloo	(Malaysia) Petaling Jaya City	Free	
9 January 2023	DF	(Malaysia) Aroon Kumar	(Malaysia) Petaling Jaya City	Free	
10 January 2023	GK	(Malaysia) Tauffiq Ar Rasyid Johar	(Malaysia) Sarawak United	Free	
12 January 2023	MF	(Malaysia) Tommy Mawat Bada	(Malaysia) Sabah	Free	
12 January 2023	FW	(Malaysia) Mahalli Jasuli	(Malaysia) Petaling Jaya City	Free	
13 January 2023	DF	(Malaysia) Zainal Abidin Jamil	(Malaysia) Petaling Jaya City	Free	
13 January 2023	MF	(Malaysia) Hasbullah Abu Bakar	(Malaysia) Johor Darul Ta'zim	Free	
14 January 2023	GK	(Malaysia) Firdaus Irman	(Malaysia) PDRM FC	Free	
14 January 2023	MF	(Malaysia) Hafiz Ramdan	(Malaysia) Sri Pahang	Free	
15 January 2023	DF	(Malaysia) Filemon Anyie	(Malaysia) Petaling Jaya City	Free	
15 January 2023	GK	(Malaysia) T. Shaheeswaran	(Malaysia) Johor Darul Ta'zim II	Free	
17 January 2023	DF	(Malaysia) Farid Nezal	(Malaysia) Perak	Free	
21 February 2023	FW	(Brazil) Casagrande	(Malaysia) Penang	Free	
21 February 2023	MF	(Brazil) Vinicius Leonel	(Brazil) CEOV Operário	Free	
22 February 2023	DF	(Singapore) Safuwan Baharudin	(Malaysia) Selangor	Free	
Transferred in mid-season
1 August 2023	FW	(Spain) Youssef Ezzejjari	(Thailand) Khon Kaen United	Free	

=== Out ===
Date	Pos.	Name	To	Fee	Ref.
31 December 2021	MF	(Malaysia) K. Sarkunan	(Malaysia) Selangor	Loan return	
1 December 2022	MF	(Malaysia) Adib Faris	(Malaysia) KL City Extension	Free	
1 December 2022	GK	(Malaysia) Syihan Hazmi	(Malaysia) Johor Darul Ta'zim	Free	
1 December 2022	DF	(Malaysia) Khuzaimi Piee	(Malaysia) Selangor	Free	
1 December 2022	FW	(Brazil) Matheus Alves	Released (Note: Joined FC Lahti after release)		
29 December 2022	DF	(Malaysia) A. Namathevan	(Malaysia) Penang	Free	
1 January 2023	DF	(Malaysia) Khair Jones	(Malaysia) Kuala Lumpur City	Free	
1 January 2023	DF	(Malaysia) Zulkhairi Zulkeply	(Malaysia) KSR SAINS	Free	
13 January 2023	DF	(Malaysia) Izaffiq Ruzi	(Malaysia) PDRM FC	Free	
19 January 2023	FW	(Brazil) Gustavo	(Kuwait) Al-Nasr SC	Free	
3 February 2023	MF	(Palestine) Yashir Pinto	(Chile) Universidad de Concepción	Free	
23 February 2023	MF	(Philippines) Omid Nazari	(Malaysia) Terengganu	Free	
Transferred out mid-season
20 June 2023	MF	(Brazil) Vinicius Leonel	Released		
13 July 2023	MF	(Singapore) Safuwan Baharudin	(Malaysia) Selangor	Free	

=== Loan in ===
Date from	Date to	Pos.	Name	From	Ref.
17 January 2023	End of season	GK	(Malaysia) Sikh Izhan Nazrel	(Malaysia) Selangor	
1 February 2023	19 July 2023	MF	(Gabon) Lévy Madinda	(Malaysia) Johor Darul Ta'zim	
Loan in mid-season
1 August 2023	End of season	FW	(Myanmar) Hein Htet Aung	(Malaysia) Selangor	

=== Loan out ===
Date from	Date to	Pos.	Name	To	Ref.
1 February 2023	End of season	GK	(Malaysia) T. Shaheeswaran	(Malaysia) Perak	
7 February 2023	End of season	GK	(Malaysia) Kaharuddin Rahman	(Malaysia) KSR SAINS	
Loan out mid-season
8 August 2023	End of season	FW	(Malaysia) N. Javabilaarivin	(Malaysia) Immigration	
11 August 2023	End of season	GK	(Malaysia) Khairul Fahmi Jamariza (Note: Negeri Sembilan U-23 player.)	(Malaysia) PIB FC	
11 August 2023	End of season	DF	(Malaysia) Muhammad Kama Edyka Azhar (Note: Negeri Sembilan U-23 player.)	(Malaysia) BRM FC	
11 August 2023	End of season	DF	(Malaysia) Muhammad Ilham Syukri Jamalluddin (Note: Negeri Sembilan U-23 player.)	(Malaysia) BRM FC	
11 August 2023	End of season	MF	(Malaysia) Mohamad Norazizi Mohd Khalid (Note: Negeri Sembilan U-23 player.)	(Malaysia) SAINS	
11 August 2023	End of season	MF	(Malaysia) Muhammad Rusydan Wahid Anuar (Note: Negeri Sembilan U-23 player.)	(Malaysia) SAINS	

== Pre-season ==
Win Draw Loss

=== Friendly matches ===
24 Jan 2023 1	Negeri Sembilan FC	1-2	Penang FC	Paroi
21:00 UTC+8	Shahrel Fikri 19'		Giovane Gomes 5' Adriano Narcizo 45+2'	Stadium: Tuanku Abdul Rahman Stadium

28 Jan 2023 2	Kelantan United	2-0	Negeri Sembilan FC	Serdang
21:00 UTC+8	Asraff Aliffuddin 17' Indra Putra 90+3'			Stadium: UPM Stadium

31 Jan 2023 3	Negeri Sembilan FC	0-0	Terengganu FC	Paroi
21:00 UTC+8				Stadium: Tuanku Abdul Rahman Stadium

4 Feb 2023 4	Manjung City F.C.	2-2	Negeri Sembilan FC	Petaling Jaya
20:45 UTC+8	Parvin Kumar 48' Furqan Azri 88'		Zaquan Adha 18' Shahrel Fikri 68'	Stadium: PKNS Sports Complex

8 Feb 2023 5	Negeri Sembilan FC	2-0	Perak FC	Paroi
21:00 UTC+8	Mahalli Jasuli 8' Zaquan Adha 28'			Stadium: Tuanku Abdul Rahman Stadium

11 Feb 2023 6	Penang FC	0-1	Negeri Sembilan FC	Penang
21:00 UTC+8			Che Rashid Che Halim 70'	Stadium: City Stadium, Penang

14 Feb 2023 7	Kuala Lumpur City FC	1-1	Negeri Sembilan FC	Cheras
20:30 UTC+8	Zhafri Yahya 82'		Filemon Anyie 48'	Stadium: Kuala Lumpur Stadium

16 Feb 2023 8	Selangor FC	3-1	Negeri Sembilan FC	Petaling Jaya
20:30 UTC+8	Hein Htet Aung 28' Fazly Mazlan 42' Ayron del Valle 44'		Mahalli Jasuli 77'	Stadium: MBPJ Stadium

== Competitions ==
=== Malaysia Super League ===
==== League table ====
Pos	Team	Pld	W	D	L	GF	GA	GD	Pts	Qualification or relegation
1	Johor Darul Ta'zim (C)	26	25	1	0	100	7	+93	76	Qualification for the AFC Champions League Elite league stage
2	Selangor	26	20	1	5	72	22	+50	61	Qualification for the AFC Champions League Two group stage (Note: Since the winners of the 2023 Malaysia FA Cup (Johor Darul Ta'zim) qualified for Asian competition based on their league positions, the berths awarded to the 2nd-placed team in the league.)
3	Sabah	26	17	3	6	64	33	+31	54	
4	Kedah Darul Aman	26	17	2	7	52	29	+23	53	
5	Sri Pahang	26	13	6	7	44	33	+11	45	
6	Terengganu	26	11	7	8	45	34	+11	40	Qualification for the AFF Shopee Cup group stage (Note: Qualified as the 2023 Malaysia Cup & 2023 Malaysia FA Cup runner-up.)
7	Kuala Lumpur City	26	10	8	8	44	39	+5	38	Qualification for the AFF Shopee Cup group stage
8	PDRM	26	11	4	11	35	37	−2	37	
9	Negeri Sembilan	26	6	9	11	33	49	−16	27	
10	Penang	26	6	6	14	29	50	−21	24	
11	Perak	26	6	4	16	25	55	−30	22	
12	Kelantan United	26	4	5	17	29	65	−36	17	
13	Kuching City	26	2	6	18	24	51	−27	12	
14	Kelantan (Note: MFL officially snubs Kelantan club licensing approval.)	26	2	2	22	29	121	−92	8	Ejected from Malaysian Super League

Source: MFL
Rules for classification: 1) Points; 2) Goal difference; 3) Number of goals scored.
(C) Champions

==== Results by round ====
Round	1	2	3	4	5	6	7	8	9	10	11	12	13	14	15	16	17	18	19	20	21	22	23	24	25	26
Ground	H	A	H	H	H	H	A	H	A	H	A	H	A	A	H	A	A	A	A	H	A	H	A	H	A	H
Result	D	D	L	W	W	W	L	D	D	L	W	D	D	L	D	L	D	D	L	L	L	L	L	W	W	L
Position	8	8	12	13	8	7	8	9	9	9	7	8	8	9	9	10	9	9	9	9	9	9	9	9	9	9

Updated to match(es) played on 21 February 2024. Source: 2023 MSL
A = Away; H = Home; W = Win; D = Draw; L = Loss

==== Matches ====
Match schedule source:

26 February 2023 1	Negeri Sembilan	1–1	Sri Pahang	Paroi
21:00 UTC+8	Casagrande 21'	Report	Malik Ariff 48'	Stadium: Tuanku Abdul Rahman Stadium; Attendance: 6329; Referee: Fitri Bin Maskon

1 March 2023 2	Penang	0–0	Negeri Sembilan	Penang
21:00 UTC+8		Report		Stadium: City Stadium, Penang; Attendance: 3754; Referee: Mohd Hasrol Bin Mohd Amir

6 March 2023 3	Negeri Sembilan	0–7	Johor Darul Ta'zim	Paroi
19:00 UTC+8		Report	Forestieri 21' 49' (pen.) Diogo 41' Arif Aiman 53' Corbin-Ong 67' 88' Endrick 74'	Stadium: Tuanku Abdul Rahman Stadium; Attendance: 15,427; Referee: Razlan Bin Joffri Ali

16 March 2023 5	Negeri Sembilan	2–1	Terengganu	Paroi
20:15 UTC+8	Lévy Madinda 28' Casagrande 67'	Report	Adisak Kraisorn 45+2'	Stadium: Tuanku Abdul Rahman Stadium; Attendance: 3203; Referee: Ahmad Zuhaidi Dzulkifli

1 April 2023 6	Negeri Sembilan	4–2	Kelantan	Paroi
22:00 UTC+8	Mahalli Jasuli 16' Herold Goulon 38' Shahrel Fikri 76' Casagrande 89'	Report	Ismahil Akinade 36' (pen.) 54'	Stadium: Tuanku Abdul Rahman Stadium; Attendance: 1885; Referee: Mohd Fusser Bin Mad Sallih

4 April 2023 7	Selangor	2–1	Negeri Sembilan	Petaling Jaya
22:00 UTC+8	Faisal Halim 56' Sharul Nazeem 90+2'	Report	Herold Goulon 45+8' (pen.)	Stadium: MBPJ Stadium; Attendance: 5754; Referee: Fitri Bin Maskon

10 April 2023 8	Negeri Sembilan	1–1	Sabah	Paroi
22:00 UTC+8	Tommy Mawat 21'	Report	Park Tae-soo 76'	Stadium: Tuanku Abdul Rahman Stadium; Attendance: 1738; Referee: Tuan Mohd Yaasin

19 April 2023 9	Perak	1–1	Negeri Sembilan	Ipoh
22:00 UTC+8	Alif Zikri 3'	Report	Shahrel Fikri 70'	Stadium: Perak Stadium; Attendance: 1147; Referee: Mohd Nafeez Abd Wahab

28 April 2023 10	Negeri Sembilan	1–2	Kedah Darul Aman	Paroi
20:15 UTC+8	Zainal Abidin 35'	Report	Willian Lira 30' 72'	Stadium: Tuanku Abdul Rahman Stadium; Attendance: 2348; Referee: Tuan Mohd Yaasin Bin Tuan Mohd Hanafiah

14 May 2023 4	Negeri Sembilan	2–1	Kuala Lumpur City	Paroi
21:00 UTC+8	Zaquan Adha 74' Safuwan 87'	Report	Zhafri Yahya 85'	Stadium: Tuanku Abdul Rahman Stadium; Attendance: 452; Referee: Mohd Fusser Bin Mad Sallih

18 May 2023 11	PDRM FC	1–2	Negeri Sembilan	Petaling Jaya
20:15 UTC+8	Amirul Waie 90'	Report	Shahrel Fikri 41' A. Selvan 90+4'	Stadium: MBPJ Stadium; Attendance: 153; Referee: Suhaizi Shukri

23 May 2023 12	Negeri Sembilan	3–3	Kelantan United	Paroi
21:00 UTC+8	Shahrel Fikri 36' Hafiz Ramdan 71' Filemon Anyie 90+5'	Report	OJ Porteria 15' Syazwan Zainon 33' Indra Putra Mahayuddin 80'	Stadium: Tuanku Abdul Rahman Stadium; Attendance: 1114; Referee: Ahmad Zuhadi Dzulkifli

4 June 2023 13	Kuching City	1–1	Negeri Sembilan	Kuching
19:30 UTC+8	Zahrul Nizwan 8'	Report	Casagrande 34'	Stadium: Sarawak Stadium; Attendance: 325; Referee: Mohd Fusser Bin Mad Sallih

9 June 2023 14	Sri Pahang	4–3	Negeri Sembilan	Kuantan
20:15 UTC+8	Stefano Brundo 24' (pen.) 90' David Rowley 80' Kpah Sherman 90+4'	Report	Hérold Goulon 8' Shahrel Fikri 15' Casagrande 24'	Stadium: Darul Makmur Stadium; Attendance: 2877; Referee: Jeevanathan M. Ponniamoorthy

26 June 2023 15	Negeri Sembilan	1–1	Penang FC	Paroi
21:00 UTC+8	Tommy Mawat 89'	Report	Giovane Gomes 49'	Stadium: Tuanku Abdul Rahman Stadium; Attendance: 998; Referee: Abang Azharudin Abdullah

8 July 2023 16	Johor Darul Ta'zim	2–0	Negeri Sembilan	Gelang Patah
21:00 UTC+8	Feroz Baharudin 21' Leandro 44'	Report		Stadium: Sultan Ibrahim Stadium; Attendance: 13 344; Referee: Mohd Fusser Bin Mad Sallih

15 July 2023 17	Kuala Lumpur City	1–1	Negeri Sembilan	Cheras
17:30 UTC+8	Romel Morales 40'	Report	Zainal Abidin 90+4'	Stadium: Kuala Lumpur Stadium; Attendance: 688; Referee: Mohammad Zamzaidi Bin Katimin

28 July 2023 18	Terengganu	1–1	Negeri Sembilan	Kuala Nerus
21:00 UTC+8	Ivan Mamut 67'	Report	Herold Goulon 89'	Stadium: Sultan Mizan Zainal Abidin Stadium; Attendance: 5025; Referee: Muhammad Khairulsyahmi Bin Ahmad Khalidi

9 August 2023 19	Kelantan	0–2	Negeri Sembilan	Kota Bharu
21:00 UTC+8	Leonardo Rolón 2' Leonardo Rolón 30'	Report		Stadium: Sultan Muhammad IV Stadium; Attendance: 505; Referee: Mohamad Faizudin Bin Ismail

14 August 2023 20	Negeri Sembilan	0–4	Selangor	-
UTC+8				Stadium: - Attendance: - Referee: -

26 August 2023 21	Sabah	3–1	Negeri Sembilan	-
UTC+8				Stadium: - Attendance: - Referee: -

1 October 2023 22	Negeri Sembilan	0–1	Perak	-
UTC+8				Stadium: - Attendance: - Referee: -

28 August 2023 23	Kedah Darul Aman	3–0	Negeri Sembilan	-
UTC+8				Stadium: - Attendance: - Referee: -

25 November 2023 24	Negeri Sembilan	2–0	PDRM FC	-
UTC+8				Stadium: - Attendance: - Referee: -

1 December 2023 25	Kelantan United	0–4	Negeri Sembilan	-
UTC+8				Stadium: - Attendance: - Referee: -

17 December 2023 26	Negeri Sembilan	1–4	Kuching City	-
UTC+8				Stadium: - Attendance: - Referee: -

=== Malaysia Cup ===
==== Round of 16 ====
5 August 2023 1st Leg	Kelantan United	0–1	Negeri Sembilan	Kota Bharu
17:30 UTC+8		Report	Sean Selvaraj 28'	Stadium: Sultan Muhammad IV Stadium; Attendance: 194; Referee: Suhaizi Shukri

=== Malaysia FA Cup ===
==== Second round ====
Key: (1) = Super League; (3) = M3 League

15 April 2023 2nd round	Negeri Sembilan (1)	2–0	PIB Shah Alam (3)	Paroi, Seremban
22:00 MYT	Casagrande 52' Shahrel Fikri 81'	Report		Stadium: Tuanku Abdul Rahman Stadium; Attendance: 497

==== Quarter-finals ====
27 May 2023	Negeri Sembilan (1)	1–3	Selangor (1)	Paroi, Seremban
20:15 MYT	Safuwan 1'	Report	Mukhairi 3'; Orozco 60', 87'	Stadium: Tuanku Abdul Rahman Stadium; Attendance: 6,203; Referee: Suhaizi Shukri

== Statistics ==
=== Appearances and goals ===
As of 21 February 2024

No.	Pos	Nat	Player	Total		League		Malaysia Cup		Malaysia FA Cup	
No.	Pos	Nat	Player	Apps	Goals	Apps	Goals	Apps	Goals	Apps	Goals
1	GK	(Malaysia) MAS	Tauffiq Ar Rasyid	0	0	0	0	0	0	0	0
2	DF	(Malaysia) MAS	Che Rashid Che Halim	29	0	24	0	3	0	2	0
3	DF	(Malaysia) MAS	Tommy Mawat Bada	27	2	21	2	4	0	2	0
4	DF	(Malaysia) MAS	Farid Nezal	0	0	0	0	0	0	0	0
5	DF	(Malaysia) MAS	Annas Rahmat	22	0	19	0	2	0	1	0
6	DF	(Malaysia) MAS	Aroon Kumar	15	0	13	0	0	0	2	0
7	FW	(Malaysia) MAS	Sean Selvaraj	15	1	12	0	3	1	0	0
8	FW	(Malaysia) MAS	Zaquan Adha	9	1	7	1	0	0	2	0
9	DF	(France) FRA	Herold Goulon	21	5	17	5	3	0	1	0
10	FW	(Myanmar) MYA	Hein Htet Aung	10	2	7	1	3	1	0	0
12	MF	(Malaysia) MAS	R. Barathkumar	17	4	14	3	3	1	0	0
13	DF	(Malaysia) MAS	Zainal Abidin Jamil	26	2	21	2	3	0	2	0
15	MF	(Malaysia) MAS	Hariz Kamarudin	19	0	15	0	4	0	0	0
16	MF	(Malaysia) MAS	Selvan Anbualagan	19	2	16	2	3	0	0	0
17	DF	(Malaysia) MAS	Nasrullah Haniff	27	0	23	0	3	0	1	0
18	FW	(Malaysia) MAS	Mahalli Jasuli	27	1	21	1	4	0	2	0
23	GK	(Malaysia) MAS	Sikh Izhan Nazrel	28	0	24	0	2	0	2	0
24	MF	(Malaysia) MAS	Saiful Ridzuwan	3	0	3	0	0	0	0	0
27	MF	(Malaysia) MAS	Fahmi Faizal	1	0	1	0	0	0	0	0
29	GK	(Malaysia) MAS	Muhaimin Mohamad	2	0	2	0	0	0	0	0
30	DF	(Malaysia) MAS	Zamri Pin Ramli	20	1	14	0	4	1	2	0
31	GK	(Malaysia) MAS	Firdaus Irman	5	0	2	0	3	0	0	0
32	FW	(Malaysia) MAS	Shahrel Fikri	19	7	16	6	1	0	2	1
33	MF	(Malaysia) MAS	Hafiz Ramdan	21	1	17	1	2	0	2	0
35	MF	(Malaysia) MAS	Hasbullah Abu Bakar	30	1	24	1	4	0	2	0
44	MF	(Malaysia) MAS	Afiq Fitri	0	0	0	0	0	0	0	0
67	MF	(Malaysia) MAS	Hakimi Rosli	0	0	0	0	0	0	0	0
70	FW	(Spain) ESP	Youssef Ezzejjari	7	1	4	0	3	1	0	0
88	MF	(Malaysia) MAS	Izzuddin Roslan	14	0	11	0	2	0	1	0
97	MF	(Malaysia) MAS	Filemon Anyie	30	1	24	1	4	0	2	0
99	FW	(Brazil) BRA	Casagrande	20	7	17	5	1	1	2	1
Players transferred out during the season
10	MF	(Gabon) GAB	Lévy Madinda	17	1	15	1	0	0	2	0
19	FW	(Malaysia) MAS	Javabilaarivin Nyanasegar (Note: Loaned to Immigration)	0	0	0	0	0	0	0	0
21	MF	(Singapore) SGP	Safuwan Baharudin	12	2	11	1	0	0	1	1
22	MF	(Brazil) BRA	Vinicius Leonel	0	0	0	0	0	0	0	0

=== Clean sheets ===
As of match played 5 August 2023

Rank	No.	Pos.	Player	League	Malaysia Cup	Malaysia FA Cup	Total
1	23	GK	(Malaysia) Sikh Izhan Nazrel	2	1	1	4
2	29	GK	(Malaysia) Muhaimin Mohamad	1	0	0	1
3	1	GK	(Malaysia) Tauffiq Ar Rasyid Johar	0	0	0	0
4	31	GK	(Malaysia) Firdaus Irman	0	0	0	0
Totals				3	1	1	5

== Development Squads ==
=== U-23 Squad ===
Currently plays in the MFL Cup tournament for 2023. This reserve league dedicated to players under the age of 23. The MFL has also allowed a quota of 5 over-age players, including 3 foreign players in each team with only 2 players allowed to play for each match.

As of 12 August 2023

Note: Flags indicate national team as defined under FIFA eligibility rules; some limited exceptions apply. Players may hold more than one non-FIFA nationality.

No.	Pos.	Nation	Player
2	DF	MAS	Mohamad Mizan Mustafa^{U23}
3	DF	MAS	Muhamad Haziq Idris^{U23}
4	DF	MAS	Muhammad Harith Samsuri^{U23}
5	DF	MAS	Muhammad Fisal Suaidi^{U23}
6	DF	MAS	Dalan Rajendran^{U23}
7	DF	MAS	Mohamad Diniy Danial Mohd Effendi^{U23}
9	FW	MAS	Muhammad Syakimi Karim^{U23}
11	DF	MAS	Vimal Nair Sugu^{U23}
13	FW	MAS	Mohamad Akif Afizi Ramzi^{U20}
14	DF	MAS	Mohamad Faizul Baharudin^{U20}
15	MF	MAS	Ariff Abdullah^{U20}
16	MF	MAS	Selvan Anbualagan^{U23} (Senior squad)

No.	Pos.	Nation	Player
17	FW	MAS	Muhammad Fawwaz Muqrish Rosli^{U20}
20	MF	MAS	Muhammad Adel Wajdi Abdrul Razak^{U23}
21	FW	MAS	Devekumaran Muniswaran^{U23}
22	FW	MAS	Muhammad Za'im Hakim Zakaria^{U23}
23	GK	MAS	Sikh Izhan Nazrel^{U23} (Senior squad)
31	GK	MAS	Firdaus Irman^{U23} (Senior squad)
32	GK	MAS	Tauffiq Ar Rasyid Johar (Senior squad)
34	DF	MAS	Hariz Kamarudin (Senior squad)
38	DF	MAS	Farid Nezal (Senior squad)
44	MF	MAS	Afiq Fitri^{U23} (Senior squad)
67	MF	MAS	Amirul Hakimi Rosli^{U23} (Senior squad)
88	MF	MAS	Izzuddin Roslan (Senior squad)

Remarks:
^{I} International player. ^{A} Asian player. ^{S} ASEAN player. ^{U23} Under-23 player. ^{U20} Under-20 player. ^{U18} Under-18 player.

=== Out on loan ===
Note: Flags indicate national team as defined under FIFA eligibility rules; some limited exceptions apply. Players may hold more than one non-FIFA nationality.

No.	Pos.	Nation	Player
1	GK	MAS	Khairul Fahmi Jamariza (to PIB FC)
8	MF	MAS	Mohamad Norazizi Mohd Khalid (to SAINS)
12	DF	MAS	Muhammad Kama Edyka Azhar (to Bunga Raya FC)
24	MF	MAS	Muhammad Rusydan Wahid Anuar (to SAINS)
27	DF	MAS	Muhammad Ilham Syukri Jamalluddin (to Bunga Raya FC)

=== U-20 Squad ===
Currently plays in the President Cup tournament for 2023.

As of 16 March 2023

Note: Flags indicate national team as defined under FIFA eligibility rules; some limited exceptions apply. Players may hold more than one non-FIFA nationality.

No.	Pos.	Nation	Player
1	GK	MAS	Silmi Bin Othman
3	DF	MAS	Muhammad Shahrul Adhha Bin Azhar
4	DF	MAS	Hezri Sham Bin Asnorhadi
5	DF	MAS	Muhammad Firdaus Bin Mohd Ya’akub
6	DF	MAS	Muhammad Farhan Bin Md Zaidi
7	FW	MAS	Abdul Mubin Bin Ab Wahab
8	MF	MAS	Muhammad Haiqal Danish Bin Khairul Nizam
9	FW	MAS	Ahmad Fariz Bin Ahmad Ghazali
10	FW	MAS	Muhammad Danish Syamer Bin Tajuddin
11	FW	MAS	Kumar a/l R. Chandran
12	MF	MAS	Aliff Danial Bin Mohd Sarazin
13	FW	MAS	Muhammad Hakimy Bin Mohd Khairol
15	DF	MAS	Muhammad Kholil Bin Ahmad Azian

No.	Pos.	Nation	Player
16	MF	MAS	Kartikeyan a/l T. M. Valluvan
17	FW	MAS	Muhamad Afifin Arfa Bin Fakhri
18	MF	MAS	Abdul Rafiq Bin Abdul Rahim
19	FW	MAS	Muhammad Shahrul Hakimi Bin Zulkifli
21	MF	MAS	Muhammad Zaim Iqbal Bin Zulkarnain
22	GK	MAS	Aif Danish Bin Saifudin
23	DF	MAS	Harish a/l Thigarajah
24	DF	MAS	Muhammad Nur Hakim Bin Mohd Nahar
25	GK	MAS	Mifdhal Aufa Bin Mohd Faizal
27	DF	MAS	Mohamad Ashraf Iqwan Bin Anuar
28	DF	MAS	Muhammad Amirul Farhan Bin Asmadi
30	MF	MAS	Syed Jaafar Muzakir Bin Syed Muhamad Ali
