= 2021 Negeri Sembilan FC season =

Negeri Sembilan
2021 season
- President: Razman al-Qadri
- Manager: K. Devan
- Stadium: Tuanku Abdul Rahman Stadium
- Malaysia Premier League: 1st (promoted) ▲
- Malaysia Cup: Disqualified
- Top goalscorer: League: Alain Akono (9); All: Alain Akono (9)
Home colours	Away colours	Third colours

The 2021 season was Negeri Sembilan's 98th year in their history and 9th season in Malaysia Premier League since it was first introduced in 2004. Also it was the third season in the Malaysia Premier League since 2019 following relegation 2018 season. Along with the league, the club will also compete in the Malaysia Cup.

== Events ==
On 26 December 2020, the club signed several new players. Among them were Raja Imran Shah Raja Amin, Barathkumar Ramaloo, Aroon Kumar, Damien Lim, Saiful Ridzuwan Selamat, Annas Rahmat and Ferris Danial. The club also signed, Tasnim Fitri and Osman Yusoff.

On 17 March 2021, the club won over Perak II in a league match.

On 25 April 2021, the club draw 1–1 against Sarawak United in a league match.

On 30 June 2021, two foreign players, Fernando Barbosa and Rafinha has been replaced with Francis Koné and Arthur Cunha during mid season transfer.

== Players ==
=== Current squad ===
As of 1 August 2021

Note: Flags indicate national team as defined under FIFA eligibility rules; some limited exceptions apply. Players may hold more than one non-FIFA nationality.

No.	Pos.	Nation	Player
1	GK	MAS	Muhaimin Mohamad
2	DF	MAS	Aroon Kumar
3	DF	MAS	Tasnim Fitri
5	DF	MAS	Annas Rahmat (Vice-captain)
6	MF	MAS	Halim Zainal
7	MF	KOR	Bae Beom-geun
8	FW	MAS	Zaquan Adha (captain)
9	FW	TOG	Francis Koné
11	MF	MAS	Alif Romli
12	MF	MAS	Barathkumar Ramaloo
13	GK	MAS	Kaharuddin Rahman
14	FW	CMR	Alain Akono
16	MF	MAS	Selvan Anbualagan
17	DF	MAS	Nasrullah Haniff

No.	Pos.	Nation	Player
18	DF	MAS	Osman Yusoff
19	FW	MAS	Javabilaarivin Nyanasegar
21	DF	MAS	Raja Imran Shah
22	GK	MAS	Damien Lim
23	DF	MAS	Danial Hadri
24	MF	MAS	Saiful Ridzuwan
25	FW	MAS	Ferris Danial
27	MF	MAS	Fahmi Faizal
29	MF	MAS	Deevan Raj
30	DF	MAS	Zamri Pin Ramli
31	GK	MAS	Azeem Farhan
44	DF	BRA	Arthur Cunha
72	DF	MAS	Zulkhairi Zulkeply

== Transfers ==
=== In ===
Note: Flags indicate national team as defined under FIFA eligibility rules; some limited exceptions apply. Players may hold more than one non-FIFA nationality.

No.	Pos.	Nation	Player
1	GK	MAS	Muhaimin Mohamad (from Felda United)
2	DF	MAS	Aroon Kumar (from Petaling Jaya City)
3	DF	MAS	Tasnim Fitri (from Felda United)
5	DF	MAS	Annas Rahmat (from Melaka United)
7	MF	KOR	Bae Beom-geun (from (Slovakia) Sereď)
8	FW	MAS	Zaquan Adha (from Kedah Darul Aman)
9	FW	TOG	Francis Koné (from Kuala Lumpur City)
11	MF	MAS	Alif Romli (from Kelantan United)
12	MF	MAS	Barathkumar Ramaloo (from Petaling Jaya City)
14	FW	CMR	Alain Akono (from (Tanzania) Azam)
17	DF	MAS	Nasrullah Haniff (from Terengganu)

No.	Pos.	Nation	Player
18	DF	MAS	Osman Yusoff (from Felda United)
21	DF	MAS	Raja Imran Shah (from Selangor II)
22	GK	MAS	Damien Lim (from Petaling Jaya City)
24	MF	MAS	Saiful Ridzuwan (from Melaka United)
25	FW	MAS	Ferris Danial (from Melaka United)
27	MF	MAS	Fahmi Faizal
29	MF	MAS	Deevan Raj (from Melaka United)
30	DF	MAS	Zamri Pin Ramli (from Penang)
31	GK	MAS	Azeem Farhan (from youth system)
44	DF	BRA	Arthur Cunha (from (Malta) Sliema Wanderers)
72	DF	MAS	Zulkhairi Zulkeply (from Kedah Darul Aman)

=== Out ===
Note: Flags indicate national team as defined under FIFA eligibility rules; some limited exceptions apply. Players may hold more than one non-FIFA nationality.

No.	Pos.	Nation	Player
1	GK	MAS	Hamka Daud (to PDRM)
3	DF	BRA	Matheus Vila (to (Brazil) America)
5	DF	MAS	Norhafiz Zamani
6	MF	MAS	Asraf Roslan
7	MF	JPN	Shunsuke Nakatake
9	MF	MAS	Shahurain Abu Samah
10	FW	BRA	Almir
11	DF	MAS	Adam Othman
16	FW	MAS	Arip Amiruddin
17	MF	MAS	Izuan Salahuddin
18	DF	MAS	Che Mohd Safwan (to Kelantan)

No.	Pos.	Nation	Player
19	MF	MAS	Aiman Khalidi
20	FW	BRA	Igor Luiz
23	DF	MAS	Izaaq Izhan (to Perak)
25	MF	MAS	Azriddin Rosli (to Kelantan United)
29	FW	MAS	Fauzi Latif (to UiTM)
31	FW	MAS	Nazrul Kamaruzaman
55	DF	MAS	Shahrom Kalam
77	MF	MAS	Shamie Iszuan (to Sarawak United)

== Competitions ==
=== Malaysia Premier League ===
==== League table ====
Pos	Team	Pld	W	D	L	GF	GA	GD	Pts	Qualification or relegation
1	Negeri Sembilan (C, P)	20	12	5	3	33	16	+17	41	Promotion to Super League and Qualification for the Malaysia Cup group stage
2	Sarawak United (P)	20	11	5	4	37	14	+23	38	Promotion to Super League and Qualification for the Malaysia Cup group stage
3	Terengganu II (Note: Johor Darul Ta'zim II, Perak II, Selangor II and Terengganu II cannot be promoted from Malaysia Premier League and play in Malaysia Cup as Johor Darul Ta'zim F.C., Perak FA, Selangor F.C. and Terengganu FC (their parent clubs) remain in Malaysia Super League and play in Malaysia Cup. Should the team be relegated to Malaysia Premier League or will not play in Malaysia Cup, Johor Darul Ta'zim II, Perak II, Selangor II and Terengganu II will have to drop to Malaysia M3 League or will play in Malaysia Cup.)	20	9	8	3	37	18	+19	35	
4	Johor Darul Ta'zim II	20	9	7	4	38	20	+18	34	
5	Kuching City	20	7	6	7	22	22	0	27	Qualification for the Malaysia Cup group stage

Source: MFL
Rules for classification: 1) Points; 2) Goal difference; 3) Number of goals scored.
(C) Champions; (P) Promoted

==== Results by round ====
Round	1	2	3	4	5	6	7	8	9	10	11	12	13	14	15	16	17	18	19	20
Ground	H	A	H	A	H	H	H	H	H	A	H	H	A	H	A	A	A	A	A	H
Result	W	W	D	W	W	D	L	W	D	W	D	D	L	W	W	W	L	W	W	W
Position	4	2	1	1	1	1	1	3	1	1	1	2	1	1	1	2	2	2	1	1

Updated to match(es) played on 21 September 2021. Source: MPL
A = Away; H = Home; W = Win; D = Draw; L = Loss

==== Matches ====
6 March 2021 1	Negeri Sembilan	2–1	Johor Darul Ta'zim II
MYT (UTC+8)

9 March 2021 2	Selangor II	1–2	Negeri Sembilan
MYT (UTC+8)

12 March 2021 3	Negeri Sembilan	2–2	Terengganu II
MYT (UTC+8)

17 March 2021 4	Perak II	0–2	Negeri Sembilan
MYT (UTC+8)

21 March 2021 5	Negeri Sembilan	2–0	FAM-MSN Project
MYT (UTC+8)

3 April 2021 6	Negeri Sembilan	0–0	Kuching City
MYT (UTC+8)

9 April 2021 7	Negeri Sembilan	2–3	Kelantan United
MYT (UTC+8)

18 April 2021 8	Negeri Sembilan	2–1	Kelantan
MYT (UTC+8)

24 April 2021 9	Negeri Sembilan	1–1	Sarawak United
MYT (UTC+8)

2 May 2021 10	PDRM	0–1	Negeri Sembilan
MYT (UTC+8)

7 May 2021 11	Negeri Sembilan	0–0	Johor Darul Ta'zim II
MYT (UTC+8)

24 July 2021 12	Negeri Sembilan	0–0	Selangor II
MYT (UTC+8)

27 July 2021 13	Terengganu II	1–0	Negeri Sembilan
MYT (UTC+8)

31 July 2021 14	Negeri Sembilan	5–0	Perak II
MYT (UTC+8)

4 August 2021 15	FAM-MSN Project	1–2	Negeri Sembilan
MYT (UTC+8)

21 August 2021 16	Kelantan United	0–2	Negeri Sembilan
MYT (UTC+8)

27 August 2021 17	Kelantan	2–1	Negeri Sembilan
MYT (UTC+8)

1 September 2021 18	Kuching City	1–2	Negeri Sembilan
MYT (UTC+8)

10 September 2021 19	Sarawak United	0–1	Negeri Sembilan
MYT (UTC+8)

21 September 2021 20	Negeri Sembilan	4–2	PDRM
MYT (UTC+8)

=== Malaysia Cup ===
==== Group stage ====
The draw for the group stage was held on 15 September 2021.

Pos	Team	Pld	W	D	L	GF	GA	GD	Pts	Qualification	MEL	KED	KLU	NSE
1	Melaka United	6	5	1	0	15	5	+10	16	Quarter-finals	—	2–0	2–1	2–0
2	Kedah Darul Aman	6	4	0	2	13	6	+7	12	Quarter-finals	1–3	—	3–0	3–0 (Note: Negeri Sembilan withdrew from the tournament on 22 October 2021, after 20 players and 4 staff members tested positive for COVID-19; this prompted them to withdraw for the safety of all parties and were advised by the team's medical doctor. As according to MFL's rule book, all of Negeri Sembilan's remaining matches were awarded a 3–0 win to the opposing team.)
3	Kelantan United	6	1	1	4	8	12	−4	4		3–3	1–3	—	0–1
4	Negeri Sembilan	6	1	0	5	1	14	−13	3	Withdrew	0–3	0–3	0–3	—

Source: MFL, FAM
Notes:

27 September 2021 1	Melaka United	2–0	Negeri Sembilan
MYT (UTC+8)

1 October 2021 2	Kelantan United	0–1	Negeri Sembilan
MYT (UTC+8)

3	v
MYT (UTC+8)

4	v
MYT (UTC+8)

5	v
MYT (UTC+8)

6	v
MYT (UTC+8)

== Statistics ==
=== Appearances and goals ===
As of 1 October 2021

No.	Pos	Nat	Player	Total		League		Malaysia Cup	
No.	Pos	Nat	Player	Apps	Goals	Apps	Goals	Apps	Goals
1	GK	(Malaysia) MAS	Muhaimin Mohamad	5	0	5	0	0	0
2	DF	(Malaysia) MAS	Aroon Kumar	19	0	17	0	2	0
3	DF	(Malaysia) MAS	Tasnim Fitri	5	0	2+2	0	0+1	0
5	DF	(Malaysia) MAS	Annas Rahmat	18	0	15+1	0	1+1	0
6	MF	(Malaysia) MAS	Halim Zainal	4	0	0+3	0	0+1	0
7	MF	(South Korea) KOR	Bae Beom-geun	20	0	13+5	0	1+1	0
8	FW	(Malaysia) MAS	Zaquan Adha	17	7	16	7	1	0
9	FW	(Togo) TOG	Francis Koné	10	5	8	5	2	0
11	MF	(Malaysia) MAS	Alif Romli	4	0	0+4	0	0	0
12	MF	(Malaysia) MAS	Barathkumar Ramaloo	21	5	16+4	5	1	0
13	GK	(Malaysia) MAS	Kaharuddin Rahman	3	0	3	0	0	0
14	FW	(Cameroon) CMR	Alain Akono	19	9	17	9	2	0
16	MF	(Malaysia) MAS	Selvan Anbualagan	20	1	0+19	1	0+1	0
17	DF	(Malaysia) MAS	Nasrullah Haniff	21	1	19	1	2	0
18	DF	(Malaysia) MAS	Osman Yusoff	5	0	4+1	0	0	0
19	FW	(Malaysia) MAS	Javabilaarivin Nyanasegar	11	1	4+6	1	0+1	0
21	DF	(Malaysia) MAS	Raja Imran Shah	9	0	0+9	0	0	0
22	GK	(Malaysia) MAS	Damien Lim	15	0	12+1	0	2	0
23	MF	(Malaysia) MAS	Danial Hadri	2	0	2	0	0	0
24	MF	(Malaysia) MAS	Saiful Ridzuwan	20	0	17+1	0	2	0
25	FW	(Malaysia) MAS	Ferris Danial	13	0	3+8	0	0+2	0
27	MF	(Malaysia) MAS	Fahmi Faizal	18	1	2+14	1	1+1	0
29	MF	(Malaysia) MAS	Deevan Raj	4	0	2+2	0	0	0
30	DF	(Malaysia) MAS	Zamri Pin Ramli	22	0	16+4	0	2	0
44	DF	(Brazil) BRA	Arthur Cunha	5	1	3	1	2	0
72	DF	(Malaysia) MAS	Zulkhairi Zulkeply	7	0	3+3	0	1	0
Players transferred out during the season
4	DF	(Brazil) BRA	Fernando Barbosa	11	0	11	0	0	0
26	FW	(Brazil) BRA	Rafinha	10	1	10	1	0	0

=== Clean sheets ===
As of match played 1 October 2021

Rank	No.	Pos.	Player	League	Malaysia Cup	Total
1	22	GK	(Malaysia) Damien Lim	6	1	7
2	1	GK	(Malaysia) Muhaimin Mohamad	3	0	3
Totals				9	1	10
