= N. Javabilaarivin =

Malaysian footballer

Personal information
- Full name: Javabilaarivin a/l Nyanasegar
- Date of birth: 17 July 2000 (age 26)
- Place of birth: Kuala Lumpur, Malaysia
- Height: 1.72 m (5 ft 8 in)
- Position: Forward

Team information
- Current team: Negeri Sembilan
- Number: 19

Youth career
- 2015–2016: Frenz United Academy
- 2018–2020: Negeri Sembilan

Senior career*
Years	Team	Apps	(Gls)
2021–	Negeri Sembilan	22	(1)
2023	→ Immigration (loan)	10	(5)

International career^{‡}
2022	Malaysia U23	1	(0)
- * Club domestic league appearances and goals as of 8 July 2026 (UTC) ‡ National team caps and goals as of 8 July 2026

Javabilaarivin a/l Nyanasegar (born 17 July 2000), simply known as Java, is a Malaysian professional footballer who plays as a forward for Malaysia Super League club Negeri Sembilan.

== Club career ==
=== Early career ===
Java studied at SMK Za'ba (SSN Negeri Sembilan) while training with Frenz United Academy between the ages of 13 and 17. In 2018, he joined Negeri Sembilan to compete in the Piala Belia, before signing for the club's Under-21 team for the 2020 Piala Presiden. During his time with the Under-19 team, he finished as Negeri Sembilan's top scorer in the Piala Belia in both 2018 and 2019 with seven goals each season. He was also the top scorer for Negeri Sembilan U-21 in the 2020 Piala Presiden with three goals.

=== Negeri Sembilan ===
Java was promoted to Negeri Sembilan's senior squad in 2021, when the club competed in the Malaysia Premier League. He was regularly included in the matchday squad from the start of the season, but had to wait until 7 May 2021 to make his senior debut in a league match against Johor Darul Ta'zim II, coming on as a 78th-minute substitute. He was part of the squad that won the 2021 Malaysia Premier League title and secured promotion to the Malaysia Super League.

=== Immigration (loan) ===
On 8 August 2023, Java joined Immigration on loan for the remainder of the season. He scored five goals and provided two assists during his loan spell, helping the club win the 2023 Malaysia M3 League title.

== International career ==
=== Malaysia U23 ===
In 2022, Java was called up to the Malaysia Under-23 squad for the AFF U-23 Championship. He made his international debut on 21 February 2022 in a group-stage match against Laos Under-23.

== Style of play ==
Java is recognised as a dynamic attacker who is known for his direct style of play and ability to take on defenders. The club has identified him as one of its young talents and has drawn comparisons between his pace and agility and former Negeri Sembilan winger S. Kunanlan.

== Career statistics ==
=== Club ===
As of 8 July 2026

Club	Season	League			Cup		League Cup		Total	
Club	Season	Division	Apps	Goals	Apps	Goals	Apps	Goals	Apps	Goals
Negeri Sembilan	2021	Malaysia Premier League	10	1	0	0	1	0	11	1
Negeri Sembilan	2022	Malaysia Super League	1	0	0	0	2	0	3	0
Negeri Sembilan	2023	Malaysia Super League	0	0	0	0	0	0	0	0
Negeri Sembilan	2024–25	Malaysia Super League	2	0	1	0	0	0	3	0
Negeri Sembilan	2025–26	Malaysia Super League	9	0	3	1	4	0	16	1
Negeri Sembilan	2026–27	Malaysia Super League	0	0	0	0	0	0	0	0
Negeri Sembilan	Total		22	1	4	1	7	0	33	2
Immigration (loan)	2023	Malaysia M3 League	10	5	0	0	0	0	10	5
Immigration (loan)	Total		10	5	0	0	0	0	10	5
Career total			32	6	4	1	7	0	43	7
