= 2022 Malaysia Super League =

Malaysian football season

Liga Super Malaysia
- Season: 2022
- Dates: 4 March – 15 October 2022
- Champions: Johor Darul Ta'zim; 9th Super League title 9th Liga M title
- Relegated: Melaka United; Sarawak United
- AFC Champions League: Johor Darul Ta'zim
- AFC Cup: Terengganu; Sabah
- Matches: 132
- Goals: 388 (2.94 per match)
- Top goalscorer: Bergson (29 goals)
- Biggest home win: 7 goals Selangor 7–0 Sarawak United (19 June 2022)
- Biggest away win: 4 goals Sarawak United 0–4 Johor Darul Ta'zim (27 July 2022)
- Highest scoring: 7 goals Selangor 7–0 Sarawak United (19 June 2022); Negeri Sembilan 4–3 Kedah Darul Aman (8 October 2022)
- Longest winning run: 9 matches Terengganu
- Longest unbeaten run: 22 matches Johor Darul Ta'zim
- Longest winless run: 13 matches Petaling Jaya City
- Longest losing run: 8 matches Penang
- Highest attendance: 34,038; Johor Darul Ta'zim 3–0 Sabah (15 October 2022)
- Total attendance: 623,384
- Average attendance: 4,723

The 2022 Malaysia Super League (Malay: Liga Super Malaysia 2022), is the 19th season of the Malaysia Super League, the top-tier professional football league in Malaysia for association football clubs since its establishment in 2004, and the 41st season of top-flight Malaysia football overall.

The defending champions from the 2021 Malaysia Super League season is Johor Darul Ta'zim.

== Teams ==
=== Team changes ===
▲ Promoted from Premier League	▼ Relegated to Premier League
Negeri Sembilan; Sarawak United	Perak; UiTM

=== Locations ===
The following twelve clubs competed in the Super League during the 2022 season

Team	Location	Stadium	Capacity
Johor Darul Ta'zim	Iskandar Puteri	Sultan Ibrahim Stadium	40,000
Kedah Darul Aman	Alor Setar	Darul Aman Stadium	32,000
Kuala Lumpur City	Cheras	Kuala Lumpur Stadium	18,000
Melaka United	Krubong	Hang Jebat Stadium	40,000
Negeri Sembilan	Seremban	Tuanku Abdul Rahman Stadium	45,000
Penang	George Town	City Stadium	20,000
Petaling Jaya City	Petaling Jaya	Petaling Jaya Stadium	25,000
Sabah	Kota Kinabalu	Likas Stadium	35,000
Sarawak United	Kuching	Sarawak State Stadium	20,000
Selangor	Shah Alam	Petaling Jaya Stadium	25,000
Sri Pahang	Kuantan	Darul Makmur Stadium	40,000
Terengganu	Kuala Terengganu	Sultan Mizan Zainal Abidin Stadium	50,000

=== Clubs locations ===
Locations of teams in the 2022 Malaysia Super League

== Personnel, kit and sponsoring ==
Team	Head coach	Captain	Kit manufacturer	Main sponsor
Johor Darul Ta'zim	(Venezuela) Héctor Bidoglio	(Malaysia) Aidil Zafuan	Nike, Inc.	UNICEF
Kedah Darul Aman	(Singapore) Aidil Sharin Sahak	(Malaysia) Syazwan Zainon	Lotto Sport Italia	DXN
Kuala Lumpur City	(Croatia) Bojan Hodak	(Brazil) Paulo Josué	HUNDRED	Kuala Lumpur City, UBB, DBKL
Melaka United	(Malaysia) Asri Ninggal (interim)	(Haiti) Sony Norde	AL Sports	KENteam
Negeri Sembilan	(Malaysia) K. Devan	(Malaysia) Zaquan Adha	Kaki Jersi	Visit Negeri Sembilan, Matrix
Penang	(Malaysia) Manzoor Azwira (interim)	(Brazil) Endrick	Puma	Penang2030
Petaling Jaya City	(Malaysia) Maniam Pachaiappan	(Malaysia) Gurusamy Kandasamy	Puma	Qnet
Sabah	(Malaysia) Ong Kim Swee	(Malaysia) Baddrol Bakhtiar	Lotto	redONE
Sarawak United	(Malaysia) S.Balachandran	(Nigeria) Uche Agba	Joma	Punggor Wibawa
Selangor	(Malaysia) Tan Cheng Hoe	(Malaysia) Brendan Gan	Joma	PKNS, MBI| | (home), Lithera (away)
Sri Pahang	(Malaysia) Dollah Salleh (interim)	(England) Lee Tuck	HakkaClo	Visit Pahang (home), Invest Pahang (away)
Terengganu	(Malaysia) Nafuzi Zain	(Bahrain) Habib Haroon	Umbro	Colever, SATU, EPIC

=== Coaching changes ===
Note: Flags indicate national team as has been defined under FIFA eligibility rules. Players may hold more than one non-FIFA nationality.

Team	Outgoing coach	Manner of departure	Date of vacancy	Position in table	Incoming coach	Date of appointment
Selangor	(Germany) Karsten Neitzel	Redesignated as Assistant Coach	21 November 2021	Pre-season	(Germany) Michael Feichtenbeiner	21 November 2021
Sri Pahang	(Malaysia) Dollah Salleh	Contract ended	30 November 2021	Pre-season	(France) Christophe Gamel	3 January 2022
Melaka United	(Malaysia) Zainal Abidin Hassan	Contract ended	30 November 2021	Pre-season	(Bosnia and Herzegovina) Risto Vidaković	22 January 2022
Sarawak United	(Malaysia) E. Elavarasan	Appointed as Malaysia assistant coach	23 February 2022	Pre-season	(Malaysia) B. Sathianathan	24 February 2022
Melaka United	(Bosnia and Herzegovina) Risto Vidaković	Contract terminated	13 April 2022	8th	(Malaysia) Mohd Asri Ninggal (interim)	15 April 2022
Sarawak United	(Malaysia) B. Sathianathan	Health reasons	June 2022	7th	(Malaysia) S.Balachandran	June 2022
Penang	(Czech Republic) Tomáš Trucha	Mutual Consent	June 2022	7th	(Malaysia) Zainal Abidin Hassan	June 2022
Sri Pahang	(France) Christophe Gamel	Sacked	21 July 2022	10th	(Malaysia) Dollah Salleh (interim)	21 July 2022
Johor Darul Ta'zim	(Mexico) Benjamin Mora	Mutual Consent	27 July 2022	1st	(Venezuela) Héctor Bidoglio	28 July 2022
Selangor	(Germany) Michael Feichtenbeiner	Redesignated as Technical Director	10 August 2022	8th	(Malaysia) Nidzam Jamil (interim)	10 August 2022
Selangor	(Malaysia) Nidzam Jamil (interim)	End of interim role	25 September 2022	8th	(Malaysia) Tan Cheng Hoe	25 September 2022
Penang	(Malaysia) Zainal Abidin Hassan	Mutual Consent	13 Oct 2022	12th	(Malaysia) Manzoor Azwira (interim)	12 October 2022
Kedah	(Singapore) Aidil Sharin Sahak	Terminated	17 Oct 2022	8th	(Malaysia) Victor Andrag (interim)	17 October 2022

== League table ==
Pos	Team	Pld	W	D	L	GF	GA	GD	Pts	Qualification or relegation
1	Johor Darul Ta'zim	22	17	5	0	61	12	+49	56	Qualification for AFC Champions League group stage
2	Terengganu	22	14	2	6	39	20	+19	44	Qualification for AFC Cup group stage
3	Sabah	22	13	3	6	36	26	+10	42	Qualification for AFC Cup group stage
4	Negeri Sembilan	22	12	5	5	33	26	+7	41	
5	Selangor	22	8	6	8	39	33	+6	30	
6	Kuala Lumpur City	22	8	5	9	30	31	−1	29	
7	Sri Pahang	22	8	4	10	33	31	+2	28	
8	Kedah Darul Aman	22	8	3	11	32	41	−9	27	
9	Petaling Jaya City (D, R)	22	6	8	8	22	30	−8	26	Withdrawn from Liga Super and dissolved. (Note: Petaling Jaya City withdrew from Liga Super before the start of 2023 season.)
10	Melaka United (D, R)	22	4	6	12	22	43	−21	18 (Note: MFL officially snubs Melaka United and Sarawak United club licensing approval, as both clubs have problem with overdue payments of staffs or players. This decision prevented both from playing in 2023 Malaysian Super League. As of November 2nd, there are still no appeal from both clubs to continue the league structure by playing in M5 League.)	Ejected from Malaysian Super League and dissolved.
11	Sarawak United (D, R)	22	5	2	15	19	50	−31	17	Ejected from Malaysian Super League and relegated to 2023 Malaysia M3 League
12	Penang	22	2	5	15	22	45	−23	11	

Updated to match(es) played on unknown. Source: MFL
Rules for classification: 1) Points; 2) Goal difference; 3) Number of goals scored.
(D) Disqualified; (R) Relegated

== Result table ==
Home \ Away	JDT	KED	KUL	MEL	NSL	PEN	PJC	SBH	SWK	SEL	PAH	TER
Johor Darul Ta'zim		4–1	5–0	4–0	5–0	1–0	4–0	3–0	6–0	5–1	2–2	2–1
Kedah Darul Aman	1–3		3–2	2–3	0–0	1–0	0–1	1–1	3–1	3–1	1–0	1–3
Kuala Lumpur City	0–3	2–1		2–0	1–0	3–2	0–0	2–0	5–0	3–3	1–2	1–2
Melaka United	1–1	0–3	0–0		0–0	4–1	2–2	0–1	2–3	2–0	2–2	2–4
Negeri Sembilan	0–1	4–3	2–1	2–0		3–2	3–1	0–1	3–2	2–2	3–0	2–1
Penang	0–1	1–2	1–0	1–1	1–1		1–1	2–4	2–3	1–1	2–3	2–1
Petaling Jaya City	2–2	3–3	1–0	1–0	0–2	2–0		1–2	1–3	0–1	0–3	3–0
Sabah	1–2	4–0	2–2	2–1	0–1	4–1	3–1		1–0	2–3	2–1	2–1
Sarawak United	0–4	0–1	1–2	1–0	1–2	1–1	0–0	0–1		0–1	1–4	0–2
Selangor	1–1	4–1	1–1	5–0	2–3	2–0	0–1	1–1	7–0		3–1	0–2
Sri Pahang	0–0	2–0	0–2	1–2	2–0	3–1	1–1	1–2	1–2	2–0		1–2
Terengganu	1–2	2–1	2–0	5–0	0–0	3–0	0–0	2–0	1–0	2–0	2–1	

Source: MFL
Legend: Blue = home team win; Yellow = draw; Red = away team win.
For upcoming matches, an "a" indicates there is an article about the rivalry between the two participants.

== Positions by round ==
The table lists the positions of teams after each week of matches.
In order to preserve chronological evolvements, any postponed matches are not included to the round at which they were originally scheduled but added to the full round they were played immediately afterward.

Team ╲ Round	1	2	3	4	5	6	7	8	9	10	11	12	13	14	15	16	17	18	19	20	21	22
Johor Darul Ta'zim	1	1	1	1	1	1	2	1	1	1	1	1	1	1	1	1	1	1	1	1	1	1
Terengganu	8	11	12	12	10	8	10	11	11	7	7	6	8	5	6	4	4	4	3	3	3	2
Sabah	11	3	4	2	3	2	3	4	2	2	3	2	2	2	2	2	2	2	2	2	2	3
Negeri Sembilan	3	4	5	6	4	4	1	2	3	3	2	3	3	3	3	3	3	3	4	4	4	4
Selangor	6	6	6	5	7	5	5	6	6	6	6	5	6	7	8	9	8	8	8	7	5	5
Kuala Lumpur City	5	7	9	7	5	6	7	5	5	5	5	7	4	4	4	6	5	6	6	5	6	6
Sri Pahang	7	10	11	9	11	9	6	8	8	10	11	11	9	9	5	5	6	7	7	8	8	7
Kedah Darul Aman	2	2	2	3	2	3	4	3	4	4	4	4	5	6	7	8	7	5	5	6	7	8
Petaling Jaya City	4	5	3	4	6	7	8	7	7	8	10	9	10	11	11	11	10	10	9	9	9	9
Melaka United	9	8	8	10	8	10	9	9	9	9	9	8	7	8	9	7	9	9	10	10	10	10
Sarawak United	12	12	10	11	12	11	11	10	10	12	8	10	11	10	10	10	11	11	11	11	11	11
Penang	10	9	7	8	9	12	12	12	12	11	12	12	12	12	12	12	12	12	12	12	12	12

Leader & Qualification for AFC Champions League group stage
Qualification for AFC Cup group stage
Possible qualification for AFC Cup group stage

Source: MFL

== Season statistics ==
- First goal of the season: 50 minutes and 58 seconds
  - (Malaysia) Khair Jones for Negeri Sembilan (A) against Sabah (4 March 2022)
- Fastest goal in a match: 51 seconds
  - (Liberia) Kpah Sherman for Terengganu (H) against Sri Pahang (3 July 2022)
- Latest goal in a match: 90 + 10 minutes and 16 seconds
  - (Italy) Fernando Forestieri for Johor Darul Ta'zim (A) against Negeri Sembilan (11 May 2022)
- Oldest Goalscorer in a match: 41 Years 6 Months 10 Days
  - (Malaysia) Amri Yahyah for Sabah against Melaka United (31 July 2022)
- Widest winning margin: 7 goals
  - Selangor 7–0 Sarawak United (19 June 2022)
- Most goals in a match: 7 goals
  - Selangor 7–0 Sarawak United (19 June 2022)
  - Negeri Sembilan 4–3 Kedah Darul Aman (8 October 2022)

=== Top goalscorers ===
Rank	Player	Club	Goals
1	(Brazil) Bergson	Johor Darul Ta'zim	29
2	(Brazil) Caion	Selangor	14
3	(Italy) Fernando Forestieri	Johor Darul Ta'zim	13
3	(Cameroon) Ronald Ngah	Kedah Darul Aman	13
3	(Ivory Coast) Kipré Tchétché	Terengganu	13
6	(Brazil) Gustavo	Negeri Sembilan	11
7	(Malaysia) Darren Lok	Petaling Jaya City	10
8	(Colombia) Steven Rodriguez	Sri Pahang	9
9	(South Korea) Park Tae-Soo	Sabah	8
10	(Nigeria) Ifedayo Olusegun	Melaka	7
10	(Argentina) Manuel Hidalgo	Sri Pahang	7
12	8 players	6 Clubs	6
20	7 players	7 Clubs	5
27	8 players	7 Clubs	4
35	13 players	9 Clubs	3
48	20 players	11 Clubs	2
68	56 players	12 Clubs	1

=== Hat-trick ===
Player	For	Against	Result	Date
(Malaysia) Darren Lok	Petaling Jaya City	Terengganu	3–0 (H)	6 April 2022
(Malaysia) Amri Yahyah	Sabah	Kedah Darul Aman	4–0 (H)	24 April 2022
(Cameroon) Ronald Ngah	Kedah Darul Aman	Petaling Jaya City	3–3 (A)	10 May 2022
(Brazil) Caion	Selangor	Sarawak United	7–0 (H)	19 June 2022
(Brazil) Bergson	Johor Darul Ta'zim	Melaka United	4–0 (H)	29 August 2022
(Ivory Coast) Kipré Tchétché	Terengganu	Melaka United	5–0 (H)	3 September 2022
(Malaysia) Ryan Lambert	Kuala Lumpur City	Sarawak United	5–0 (H)	28 September 2022
(Ivory Coast) Kipré Tchétché	Terengganu	Melaka United	2–4 (A)	7 October 2022

Notes (H) – Home team (A) – Away team

=== Clean Sheets ===
Rank	Player	Club	Clean sheets
1	(Malaysia) Farizal Marlias	Johor Darul Ta'zim	11
2	(Malaysia) Kalamullah Al-Hafiz	Petaling Jaya City	9
3	(Philippines) Kevin Ray Mendoza	Kuala Lumpur City	7
3	(Malaysia) Syihan Hazmi	Negeri Sembilan	7
5	(Malaysia) Khairul Fahmi Che Mat	Sabah	5
5	(Mali) Mamadou Samassa	Sri Pahang	5
5	(Malaysia) Suhaimi Husin	Terengganu	5
5	(Malaysia) Rahadiazli Rahalim	Terengganu	5
9	(Malaysia) Sam Somerville	Selangor	4
10	(Malaysia) Shahril Saa'ri	Kedah Darul Aman	2
10	(Malaysia) Bryan See Tian Keat	Melaka United	2
12	(Malaysia) Haziq Nadzli	Johor Darul Ta'zim	1
12	(Malaysia) Ifwat Akmal	Kedah Darul Aman	1
12	(Malaysia) Ilham Amirullah	Kedah Darul Aman	1
12	(Malaysia) Norazlan Razali	Melaka United	1
12	(Malaysia) Khatul Anuar	Penang	1
12	(Malaysia) Khairul Azhan	Selangor	1
12	(Malaysia) Aquila Abdul Rahman	Sarawak United	1
12	(Malaysia) Tauffiq Ar Rasyid	Sarawak United	1

=== Discipline ===
==== Players ====
- Most yellow cards: 7
  - (Malaysia) Saiful Ridzuwan (Negeri Sembilan)
- Most red cards: 1
  - (Brazil) Bergson (Johor Darul Ta'zim)
  - (Australia) Giancarlo Gallifuoco (Kuala Lumpur City)
  - (Malaysia) Kenny Pallraj (Kuala Lumpur City)
  - (Malaysia) Haziq Puad (Melaka)
  - (Malaysia) Wan Zaharulnizam (Melaka)
  - (Brazil) Matheus Alves (Negeri Sembilan)
  - (Malaysia) Nasrullah Haniff (Negeri Sembilan)
  - (Malaysia) Sukri Hamid (Penang)
  - (Brazil) Rafael Vitor (Penang)
  - (Malaysia) Rizal Ghazali (Sabah)
  - (Malaysia) Rawilson Batuil (Sabah)
  - (Malaysia) Sharul Nazeem (Selangor)
  - (Jordan) Yazan Al-Arab (Selangor)
  - (Malaysia) Zikri Khalili (Selangor)
  - (Malaysia) Raja Imran Shah (Sarawak United)
  - (Malaysia) Sharbinee Allawee (Sarawak United)
  - (Malaysia) Azwan Aripin (Sri Pahang)
  - (Malaysia) Muslim Ahmad (Sri Pahang)
  - (Liberia) Kpah Sherman (Terengganu)

==== Club ====
- Most red cards: 3
  - Selangor
- Most yellow cards: 51
  - Selangor
- Fewest yellow cards: 22
  - Terengganu
- Fewest red cards: 0
  - Kedah Darul Aman
  - Petaling Jaya City

=== Attendances to Stadiums ===
Pos	Team	Total	High	Low	Average	Change
1	Johor Darul Ta'zim	181,316	34,038	8,371	16,484	n/a
2	Sabah	98,954	23,523	2,343	8,996	n/a
3	Terengganu	72,790	13,689	2,360	6,618	n/a
4	Negeri Sembilan	69,374	22,224	1,898	6,307	n/a
5	Kedah Darul Aman	53,657	14,954	1,372	4,878	n/a
6	Melaka United	33,737	14,562	987	3,067	n/a
7	Sri Pahang	30,510	10,156	1,013	2,774	n/a
8	Selangor	24,622	4,104	680	2,239	n/a
9	Penang	23,271	6,252	541	2,116	n/a
10	Kuala Lumpur City	15,105	2,693	365	1,374	n/a
11	Sarawak United	12,181	5,512	322	1,108	n/a
12	Petaling Jaya City	7,867	1,714	110	716	n/a
	League total	623,384	34,038	110	4,723	n/a

Source: FAM-CMS

== See also ==
- 2022 Malaysia Premier League
- 2022 Malaysia M3 League
- 2022 Malaysia M5 League
- 2022 Malaysia FA Cup
- 2022 Malaysia Cup
- 2022 Piala Presiden
- 2022 Piala Belia
