= Zulkhairi Zulkeply =

Malaysian footballer

Personal information
- Full name: Muhammad Zulkhairi bin Zulkeply
- Date of birth: 2 May 1995 (age 31)
- Place of birth: Bukit Mertajam, Malaysia
- Height: 1.76 m (5 ft 9 1/2 in)
- Position: Centre-back

Team information
- Current team: Melaka
- Number: 42

Youth career
- 2013: Kedah Darul Aman U21

Senior career*
Years	Team	Apps	(Gls)
2014–2016	UiTM	18	(0)
2017	Penang	12	(0)
2018–2019	UiTM	13	(0)
2020–2021	Kedah Darul Aman	2	(0)
2021–2022	Negeri Sembilan	16	(0)
2023–2024	KSR SAINS		
2024–	Melaka		

International career^{‡}
2016	Malaysia U22	0	(0)
- * Club domestic league appearances and goals as of 15 July 2025 ‡ National team caps and goals as of 4 August 2016

Muhammad Zulkhairi bin Zulkeply (born 2 May 1995) is a Malaysian professional footballer who plays as a centre-back for Malaysia Super League club Melaka.

== Club career ==
=== Kedah ===
On 23 December 2019, Zulkhairi Zulkeply agreed to join Malaysia Super League side Kedah. He made his debut for the club in 2020 AFC Champions League qualifying play-offs playing against FC Seoul on 28 January 2020.

=== Negeri Sembilan ===
In 2021 he joined the team Negeri Sembilan FC on a free transfer. He has been with the team for two years and has become an important player.

== International career ==
Zulkhairi was part of 2016 Nations Cup squad.

== Career statistics ==
As of 2 April 2021

=== Club ===
Club	Season	League			Cup		League Cup		Continental		Total	
Club	Season	Division	Apps	Goals	Apps	Goals	Apps	Goals	Apps	Goals	Apps	Goals
Kedah Darul Aman	2020	Malaysia Super League	2	0	0	0	0	0	2	0	4	0
Kedah Darul Aman	2021	Malaysia Super League	1	0	0	0	0	0	0	0	1	0
Kedah Darul Aman	Total		3	0	0	0	0	0	2	0	5	0
Negeri Sembilan	2021	Malaysia Super League	6	0	–		1	0	–		7	0
Negeri Sembilan	2022	Malaysia Super League	0	0	0	0	0	0	0	0	0	0
Negeri Sembilan	2023	Malaysia Super League	0	0	0	0	0	0	0	0	0	0
Negeri Sembilan	Total		0	0	0	0	0	0	0	0	0	0
Career total			0	0	0	0	0	0	0	0	0	0
