= Annas Rahmat =

Malaysian footballer

Personal information
- Full name: Annas bin Rahmat
- Date of birth: 7 November 1994 (age 32)
- Place of birth: Seremban, Negeri Sembilan, Malaysia
- Height: 1.79 m (5 ft 10 in)
- Position: Centre-back

Team information
- Current team: Negeri Sembilan
- Number: 5

Youth career
- 2013: Negeri Sembilan U-19

Senior career*
Years	Team	Apps	(Gls)
2014–2015	Harimau Muda B	39	(2)
2016–2017	Negeri Sembilan	27	(3)
2018	PKNS	1	(0)
2019	Petaling Jaya City	17	(0)
2020	Melaka United	9	(0)
2021–	Negeri Sembilan	59	(1)

International career^{‡}
2013	Malaysia U-23	29	(0)
- * Club domestic league appearances and goals as of 12 May 2025 ‡ National team caps and goals as of 28 October 2017

Annas bin Rahmat (born 7 November 1994) is a Malaysian professional footballer who plays as a centre-back for Negeri Sembilan.

== Club career ==
=== Negeri Sembilan ===
Born in Seremban, Negeri Sembilan, Annas began his career with Negeri Sembilan youth team. He later played for Harimau Muda B for 2014 and 2015 season.

=== PKNS ===
On 2 December 2017, Annas signed a contract with PKNS after his contract with Negeri Sembilan expired.

=== Negeri Sembilan ===
In 2021 he returned to join the team Negeri Sembilan FC on a free transfer after spent two years with the team in 2016 and 2017. Has been with the team for two years since 2021 and has been a squad player throughout 2022. He has helped the team secure fourth place in the Malaysia Super League in 2022. It is an impressive achievement as the team has just been promoted from the Malaysia Premier League in the previous year and had shocked the other Malaysia Super League teams because Negeri Sembilan FC was considered an underdog team. He has made 27 appearances during his time with Negeri Sembilan FC since 2021.

== Career statistics ==
=== Club ===
As of 28 July 2018.

Appearances and goals by club, season and competition
Club	Season	League			Cup		League Cup		Total	
Club	Season	Division	Apps	Goals	Apps	Goals	Apps	Goals	Apps	Goals
Harimau Muda B	2014	S.League	13	0	0	0	0	0	13	0
Harimau Muda B	2015	S.League	26	0	0	0	0	0	26	0
Harimau Muda B	Total		39	0	0	0	0	0	39	0
Negeri Sembilan	2016	Malaysia Premier League	12	0	2	0	0	1	0	1
Negeri Sembilan	2017	Malaysia Premier League	17	1	6	0	4	0	27	1
Negeri Sembilan	Total		0	1	8	0	0	1	0	2
PKNS	2018	Malaysia Super League	1	0	0	0	0	0	1	0
PKNS	Total		1	0	0	0	0	0	1	0
Negeri Sembilan	2021	Malaysia Premier League	16	0	0	0	2	0	18	0
Negeri Sembilan	2022	Malaysia Super League	11	0	1	0	4	0	16	0
Negeri Sembilan	2023	Malaysia Super League	19	0	1	0	2	0	22	0
Negeri Sembilan	2024–25	Malaysia Super League	13	1	1	0	4	0	18	1
Negeri Sembilan	Total		59	1	3	0	12	0	74	1
