= Nasrullah Haniff =

Malaysian footballer

Personal information
- Full name: Nasrullah Haniff bin Johan
- Date of birth: 25 June 1990 (age 36)
- Place of birth: Alor Setar, Kedah, Malaysia
- Height: 1.75 m (5 ft 9 in)
- Position: Centre-back

Team information
- Current team: Bunga Raya F.C.
- Number: 17

Youth career
- Negeri Sembilan

Senior career*
| Years | Team | Apps | (Gls) |
| 2011–2012 | MP Muar | 8 | (0) |
| 2012–2016 | NS Betaria | | |
| 2016–2017 | DRB-Hicom | | |
| 2017–2020 | Terengganu | 61 | (3) |
| 2021–2025 | Negeri Sembilan | 76 | (3) |
| 2025–2026 | AAK | | |
- * Club domestic league appearances and goals

Nasrullah Haniff bin Johan (born 25 June 1990) is a Malaysian professional footballer who plays as a centre-back.

== Club career ==
=== Negeri Sembilan ===
Nasrullah signed a two-year contract with Negeri Sembilan in December 2020. He joined Negeri Sembilan on a free transfer. Has been with the team for two years and has become a key player throughout 2022. He has helped the team secure fourth place in the Malaysia Super League in 2022. It is an impressive achievement as the team has just been promoted from the Malaysia Premier League in the previous year and had shocked the other Malaysia Super League teams as Negeri Sembilan was considered an underdog team. He has made 39 appearances and score 2 goals during his time with Negeri Sembilan. Nasrullah was name as the club captain for the 2024–25 season.

== Career statistics ==
As of matches played 19 June 2025

Appearances and goals by club, season and competition
| Club | Season | League | | | FA Cup | | Malaysia Cup | | Total | |
| Club | Season | Division | Apps | Goals | Apps | Goals | Apps | Goals | Apps | Goals |
|---|---|---|---|---|---|---|---|---|---|---|
| Terengganu | 2017 | Malaysia Super League | 19 | 1 | 6 | 0 | 4 | 0 | 29 | 1 |
| Terengganu | 2018 | Malaysia Super League | 18 | 0 | 2 | 0 | 7 | 1 | 27 | 1 |
| Terengganu | 2019 | Malaysia Super League | 17 | 2 | 4 | 1 | 1 | 1 | 22 | 4 |
| Terengganu | 2020 | Malaysia Super League | 7 | 0 | 0 | 0 | 1 | 0 | 8 | 0 |
| Terengganu | Total | | 61 | 3 | 12 | 1 | 13 | 2 | 86 | 6 |
| Negeri Sembilan | 2021 | Malaysia Premier League | 19 | 1 | — | | 0 | 0 | 18 | 1 |
| Negeri Sembilan | 2022 | Malaysia Super League | 20 | 1 | 1 | 0 | 3 | 0 | 24 | 1 |
| Negeri Sembilan | 2023 | Malaysia Super League | 23 | 0 | 3 | 0 | 1 | 0 | 27 | 0 |
| Negeri Sembilan | 2024–25 | Malaysia Super League | 14 | 1 | 2 | 0 | 1 | 0 | 17 | 1 |
| Negeri Sembilan | Total | | 76 | 3 | 6 | 0 | 5 | 0 | 86 | 3 |
