= Zaquan Adha =

Malaysian footballer (born 1987)

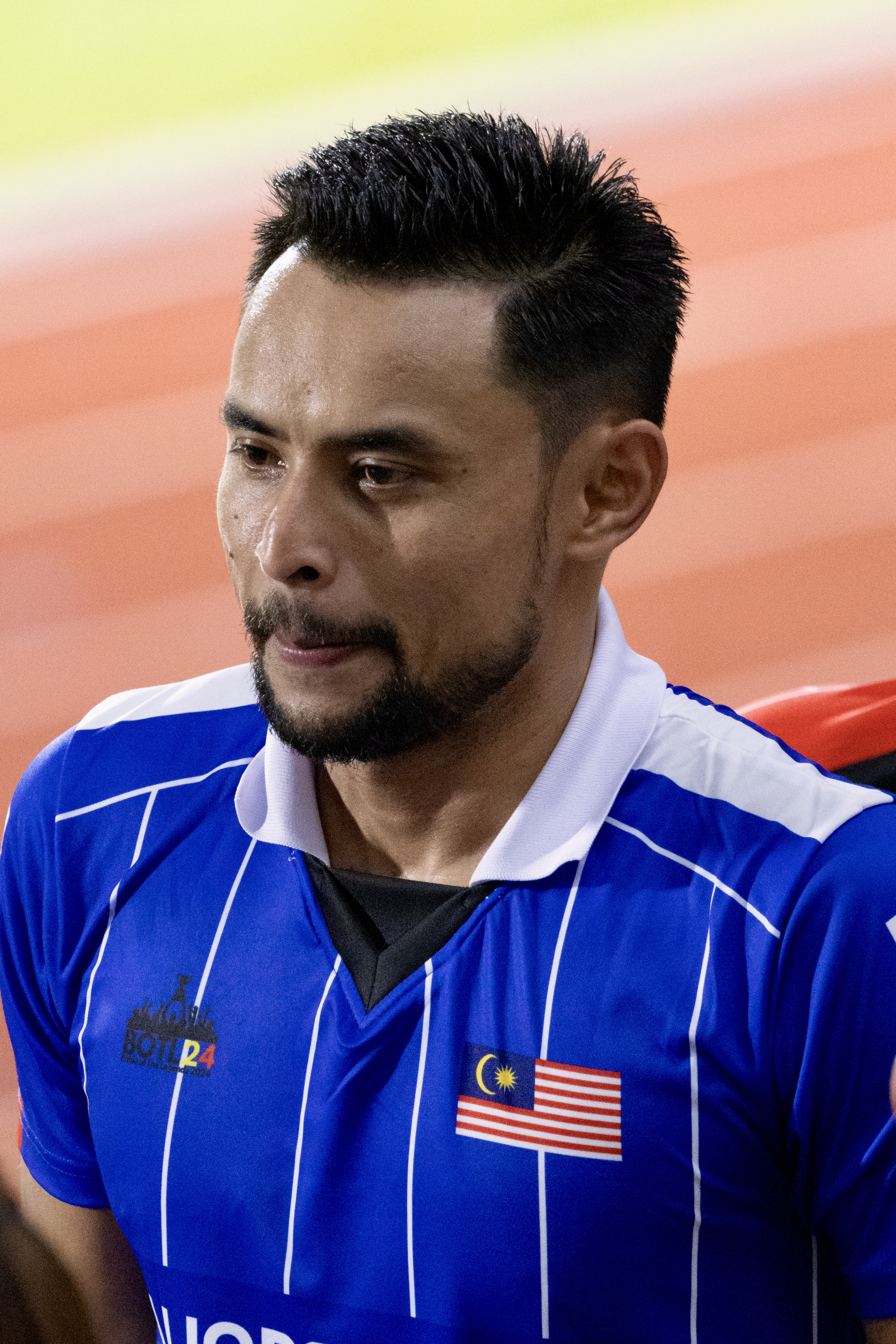
- Zaquan in 2024

Personal information
- Full name: Mohamad Zaquan Adha bin Abd. Radzak
- Date of birth: 3 August 1987 (age 39)
- Place of birth: Seremban, Negeri Sembilan, Malaysia
- Height: 1.76 m (5 ft 9 1/2 in)
- Position: Forward

Youth career
- 2001–2003: Bukit Jalil Sports School
- 2004–2005: Negeri Sembilan U-19

Senior career*
Years	Team	Apps	(Gls)
2005–2011	Negeri Sembilan	?	(29)
2012	ATM	20	(3)
2013	Johor Darul Ta'zim	5	(0)
2014–2016	Johor Darul Ta'zim II	47	(12)
2017	Perak	21	(2)
2018	Kuala Lumpur	14	(2)
2019–2020	Kedah	28	(2)
2021–2023	Negeri Sembilan	43	(9)

International career^{‡}
2004–2006	Malaysia U-20		
2007–2010	Malaysia U-23	26	(7)
2007–2019	Malaysia	49	(12)
Medal record
Men's football
Representing Malaysia
Men's football
AFF Championship
Runner-up	2018
Malaysia U23
SEA Games
Gold medal – first place	2009 Laos
Winner	2007
Malaysia U18
Lion City Cup
Winner	2005
- * Club domestic league appearances and goals as of 05:40, May 24, 2023 (UTC) ‡ National team caps and goals as of 20 March 2019

Mohamad Zaquan Adha bin Abd. Radzak (born 3 August 1987) is a Malaysian former professional footballer who played as a forward.

== Personal life ==
He is the younger of a set of twins; his brother Aidil Zafuan is also a footballer.

== Club career ==
=== Negeri Sembilan FA ===
Zaquan started representing the Negeri Sembilan FA football team in the 2004 SUKMA Games. He with his twin brother won the gold medal in the 2004 SUKMA Games football competition. In the 2005–06 season, he and his brother were promoted into the senior team, and Negeri Sembilan also won their first Malaysia Super League title.

His contract with Negeri Sembilan was scheduled to end at the end of the 2008 season. Zaquan and his brother had been attracting interest from several Slovak top league clubs. He had confirmed that he and his brother would sign a contract with an unnamed Slovak Corgoň Liga team after the 2008 AFF Suzuki Cup. However, he and Aidil remained with Negeri Sembilan.

=== Malaysian Armed Forces ===
In December 2011, it was announced that Zaquan signed a contract with the Malaysia Premier League team, Malaysian Armed Forces FA. He has helped the club win the 2012 Malaysia Premier League title and reach the 2012 Malaysia Cup final before losing to Kelantan 3–2.

=== Johor Darul Ta'zim ===
For the 2013 season, Zaquan joined the rebranded club Johor Darul Ta'zim F.C. along with his twin brother. He suffered an ACL injury on April and left out for the rest of the season.

On 9 November 2013, it was announced that Zaquan was demoted to Johor Darul Ta'zim II in the Malaysia Premier League after one season playing for Johor Darul Ta'zim.

=== Perak TBG ===
On 21 December 2016, Zaquan signed a one-year contract with Malaysia Super League club Perak. He scored his first goal for his new club in a 2–2 draw against Felda United. He then converted a penalty against Selangor FA in a 1–0 victory against the Red Giants.

=== Kuala Lumpur ===
On 5 December 2017, Zaquan signed a contract with newly promoted side Kuala Lumpur. He made his debut and scored his first goal for the club in a dramatic 4–3 victory against Kedah FA. He scored his second goal for the club in a dramatic Klang Valley Derby during the 2018 Malaysia FA Cup quarter finals. Despite KL winning 3–0, they eventually lost on penalties (8–7).

=== Negeri Sembilan ===
It was reported by the Malaysian news site Utusan Malaysia that Zaquan has signed for Negeri Sembilan in December 2020. Negeri Sembilan is a rebrand club of Negeri Sembilan FA football team, the team which he played his first professional football for. He played a major part in 2021 season with 7 league goals in 16 appearances as Negeri Sembilan were promoted to the Malaysia Super League at the end of the season as champions.

On 14 March 2024, Zaquan announced his retirement from football.

== International career ==
=== Youth ===
Zaquan has been representing Malaysia since he was 14 years old, with his twin brother Mohd Aidil Zafuan Abdul Radzak. He was part of the Malaysia youth squad for 2004 AFC Youth Championship. He was then called up by coach K. Rajagopal in the 2006 AFC Youth Championship qualifier against Myanmar. He scored 2 goals in the qualifier to take Malaysia into their second appearance in a row to the 2006 AFC Youth Championship held in India. However, he didn't make it into the tournament because of an injury.

=== Malaysia U23 ===
Zaquan was called up by Malaysia U23 national coach B. Sathianathan during the 2008 Olympic games qualifier fourth group match against Hong Kong, after he recovered from an injury. During the 2007 Merdeka Tournament, Zaquan scored 3 goals, one of them in the final against Myanmar. Malaysia beat Myanmar 3–1 and took the trophy for the first time since last winning it in 1993. He was then chosen for the 2007 Southeast Asian Games. Malaysia however failed to advanced after a draw against rivals Singapore. Zaquan was called up again by national coach K.Rajagobal for 2009 Southeast Asian Games in Vientiane, Laos. The national U-23 side won gold medal for the first time after 20 years since the team won it in 1989.

=== Senior ===
Zaquan made his senior debut against Bahrain in the 2010 FIFA World Cup qualifier on 2007. Malaysia lost their first match of the qualifier 4–1 before drawing 0–0 at Shah Alam. He was a regular with the national team from 2008 until 2010 and have played in 2008 AFF Cup and 2011 Asian Cup qualifiers in 2009. He missed the 2010 and 2012 AFF Cup due to an injury. He return to the national team in 2016 under Ong Kim Swee and listed for the 2016 AFF Cup.

On 24 March 2018, he was called up by Tan Cheng Hoe and selected as the captain for the match against Lebanon in the 2019 AFC Asian Cup qualifiers, where Malaysia lost 2–1. In the friendly match against Bhutan, he scored 4 goals in the 7–0 victory, ending Malaysia's 2 years and 12 games winless run. He was chosen as captain for the Malaysian team in their AFF Cup 2018 campaign where Malaysia finish as the runners up.

Zaquan also represented the Malaysia XI against European league team who did a tour to Asia such as Chelsea in 2008 and Manchester United in 2009.

== Career statistics ==
=== Club ===
As of match played 1 March 2023

Appearances and goals by club, season and competition
Club	Season	League			FA Cup		Malaysia Cup		Other		Total	
Club	Season	Division	Apps	Goals	Apps	Goals	Apps	Goals	Apps	Goals	Apps	Goals
Negeri Sembilan	2005-06	Malaysia Super League		0		0		0	–			0
Negeri Sembilan	2006-07	Malaysia Super League		0		1		1	3 (Note: Appearances in 2007 AFC Cup.)	0		2
Negeri Sembilan	2007-08	Malaysia Super League		11		1		3	–			15
Negeri Sembilan	2009	Malaysia Super League		11		2		10	–			23
Negeri Sembilan	2010	Malaysia Super League		7		7		0	–			14
Negeri Sembilan	2011	Malaysia Super League	3	0	0	0	2	0	–		5	0
Negeri Sembilan	Total			29		11		14	3	0		54
ATM	2012	Malaysia Premier League	20	3	1	0	10	1	–		31	4
ATM	Total		20	3	1	0	10	1	–		31	4
Johor Darul Ta'zim	2013	Malaysia Super League	5	0	3	0	0	0	–		8	0
Johor Darul Ta'zim	Total		5	0	3	0	0	0	–		8	0
Johor Darul Ta'zim II	2014	Malaysia Premier League	5	1	0	0	6	1	1 (Note: Appearances in 2014 Malaysia Cup play-off.)	1	12	3
Johor Darul Ta'zim II	2015	Malaysia Premier League	20	4	3	0	6	1	1 (Note: Appearances in 2015 Malaysia Cup play-off.)	0	30	5
Johor Darul Ta'zim II	2016	Malaysia Premier League	22	7	1	0	3	2	–		26	9
Johor Darul Ta'zim II	Total		47	12	4	0	15	4	2	1	68	17
Perak	2017	Malaysia Super League	21	2	2	0	9	0	–		32	2
Perak	Total		21	2	2	0	9	0	–		32	2
Kuala Lumpur	2018	Malaysia Super League	14	2	4	1	6	1	–		24	4
Kuala Lumpur	Total		14	2	4	1	6	1	–		24	4
Kedah	2019	Malaysia Super League	21	2	6	2	8	1	–		35	5
Kedah	2020	Malaysia Super League	7	0	0	0	0	0	1 (Note: Appearances in 2020 AFC Champions League preliminary.)	0	8	0
Kedah	Total		28	2	6	2	8	1	1	0	43	5
Negeri Sembilan	2021	Malaysia Premier League	16	7	–		1	0	–		17	7
Negeri Sembilan	2022	Malaysia Super League	20	1	1	0	4	1	–		25	2
Negeri Sembilan	2023	Malaysia Super League	7	1	2	0	0	0	–		9	1
Negeri Sembilan	Total		43	9	3	0	5	1	–		51	10
Career Total				59		14		22	6	1		96

=== International ===
As of 20 March 2019

Appearances and goals by national team and year
National team	Year	Apps	Goals
Malaysia	2007	2	0
Malaysia	2008	11	2
Malaysia	2009	7	2
Malaysia	2010	2	0
Malaysia	2011	0	0
Malaysia	2012	5	0
Malaysia	2013	0	0
Malaysia	2014	0	0
Malaysia	2015	0	0
Malaysia	2016	7	0
Malaysia	2017	0	0
Malaysia	2018	14	8
Malaysia	2019	1	0
Total		49	12

=== International goals ===
Scores and results list Malaysia's goal tally first.

#	Date	Venue	Opponent	Score	Result	Competition
1.	10 October 2008	Bukit Jalil National Stadium, Kuala Lumpur, Malaysia	Pakistan	2–0	4–1	Friendly
2.	20 October 2008	Petaling Jaya Stadium, Petaling Jaya, Malaysia	Afghanistan	2–0	6–0	2008 Pestabola Merdeka
3.	11 September 2009	Bukit Jalil National Stadium, Kuala Lumpur, Malaysia	Lesotho	1–0	5–0	Friendly
4.	14 November 2009	Buxoro Arena, Tashkent, Uzbekistan	Uzbekistan	1–3	1–3	2011 AFC Asian Cup qualification
	30 December 2009	Bukit Jalil National Stadium, Kuala Lumpur, Malaysia	Syria	3–1	4–1	Friendly^{1}
5.	1 April 2018	Bukit Jalil National Stadium, Kuala Lumpur, Malaysia	Bhutan	2–0	7–0	Friendly
6.	1 April 2018	Bukit Jalil National Stadium, Kuala Lumpur, Malaysia	Bhutan	4–0	7–0	Friendly
7.	1 April 2018	Bukit Jalil National Stadium, Kuala Lumpur, Malaysia	Bhutan	5–0	7–0	Friendly
8.	1 April 2018	Bukit Jalil National Stadium, Kuala Lumpur, Malaysia	Bhutan	6–0	7–0	Friendly
9.	3 November 2018	Bukit Jalil National Stadium, Kuala Lumpur, Malaysia	Maldives	1–0	3–0	Friendly
10.	12 November 2018	Bukit Jalil National Stadium, Kuala Lumpur, Malaysia	Laos	1–1	3–1	2018 AFF Championship
11.	24 November 2018	Bukit Jalil National Stadium, Kuala Lumpur, Malaysia	Myanmar	2–0	3–0	2018 AFF Championship
12.	24 November 2018	Bukit Jalil National Stadium, Kuala Lumpur, Malaysia	Myanmar	3–0	3–0	2018 AFF Championship

^{1} Not FIFA 'A' International match.

== Honours ==
=== Club ===
Negeri Sembilan

- Sukma Games: 2004
- Malaysia Super League: 2005-06
- Malaysia Premier League: 2021
- Malaysia Cup: 2009, 2011
- Malaysia FA Cup: 2010

ATM

- Malaysia Premier League: 2012

Kedah

- Malaysia FA Cup: 2019

=== International ===
Malaysia U-18

- Lion City Cup: 2005

Malaysia U-23

- Merdeka Cup: 2007
- Southeast Asian Games: 2009

Malaysia

- AFF Championship runner-up: 2018

=== Individual ===
- FAM Football Awards Best Young Players: 2006-07
