= Barathkumar Ramaloo =

Malaysian footballer

R. Barathkumar
Personal information
- Full name: Barathkumar a/l Ramaloo
- Date of birth: 23 April 1992 (age 34)
- Place of birth: Kuala Pilah, Negeri Sembilan, Malaysia
- Height: 1.69 m (5 ft 6 1/2 in)
- Position: Midfielder

Team information
- Current team: Kedah FA
- Number: 12

Senior career*
Years	Team	Apps	(Gls)
2015	Felda United		
2016	Melaka United		
2017	Petaling Jaya Rangers		
2018–2020	Petaling Jaya City	25	(4)
2021	Negeri Sembilan	20	(5)
2022	Petaling Jaya City	11	(1)
2023–2025	Negeri Sembilan	33	(5)
2025–	Kedah FA	0	(0)
- * Club domestic league appearances and goals

Barathkumar a/l Ramaloo (born 23 April 1992) is a Malaysian professional footballer who plays as a midfielder.

== Club career ==
He signed with Negeri Sembilan in 2021. He was transferred to Petaling Jaya City in 2022. In January 2023 he returned to Negeri Sembilan.

== Personal life ==
Aroon has a brother, Aroon Kumar, who is also a professional footballer.

== Career statistics ==
=== Club ===
As of 19 June 2025

Club	Season	League			Malaysia Cup		Malaysia FA Cup		Total	
Club	Season	Division	Apps	Goals	Apps	Goals	Apps	Goals	Apps	Goals
Negeri Sembilan	2021	M-Premier League	20	5	1	0	0	0	21	5
PJ City	2022	M-Super League	11	1	0	0	0	0	11	1
Negeri Sembilan	2023	M-Super League	14	3	3	1	0	0	17	4
Negeri Sembilan	2024–25	M-Super League	19	2	2	0	0	0	21	2
Negeri Sembilan	Total		33	5	5	1	0	0	38	6
