= Aroon Kumar =

Malaysian footballer

R. Aroon Kumar
Personal information
- Full name: Aroon Kumar a/l Ramaloo
- Date of birth: 18 March 1994 (age 32)
- Place of birth: Bahau, Negeri Sembilan, Malaysia
- Height: 1.74 m (5 ft 8 1/2 in)
- Position: Right-back

Team information
- Current team: Melaka
- Number: 18

Youth career
- 2014: Melaka United
- 2015: Negeri Sembilan

Senior career*
Years	Team	Apps	(Gls)
2016–2019	Negeri Sembilan		
2020	Petaling Jaya City	11	(0)
2021	Negeri Sembilan	17	(0)
2022	Petaling Jaya City	21	(0)
2023–2025	Negeri Sembilan	31	(0)
2025–	Melaka	1	(0)
- * Club domestic league appearances and goals as of 14 August 2025

Aroon Kumar a/l Ramaloo (born 18 March 1994) is a Malaysian professional footballer who plays as a right-back for Malaysia Super League club Melaka. He also can operates as a centre-back and midfielder.

== Career ==
He started his football career for the senior team in 2016 after being promoted to the Negeri Sembilan first team. He has been with the team for 4 years and made 2 appearances. He was transferred to Petaling Jaya City FC in 2020.

He returned to Negeri Sembilan in 2021. He made 17 appearances. After spending only one season with Negeri Sembilan, he was again transferred to Petaling Jaya City in 2022.

In 2023 he returned to join Negeri Sembilan. He was officially announced on January 9, 2023.

== Personal life ==
Aroon has a brother, Barathkumar, who is also a professional footballer.

== Career statistics ==
=== Club ===
As of 19 June 2025

Club	Season	League			Malaysia Cup		Malaysia FA Cup		Total	
Club	Season	Division	Apps	Goals	Apps	Goals	Apps	Goals	Apps	Goals
Negeri Sembilan	2021	M-Premier League	17	0	2	0	0	0	19	0
PJ City	2022	M-Super League	17	0	2	0	1	0	20	0
Negeri Sembilan	2023	M-Super League	13	0	0	0	2	0	15	0
Negeri Sembilan	2024–25	M-Super League	18	0	3	0	1	0	22	0
Negeri Sembilan	Total		31	0	3	0	3	0	37	0
