= Afiq Fitri =

Malaysian footballer

Personal information
- Full name: Muhammad Afiq Fitri bin Mohd Jefry
- Date of birth: 18 November 2002 (age 23)
- Place of birth: Pasir Gudang, Johor, Malaysia
- Height: 1.70 m (5 ft 7 in)
- Positions: Midfielder; left back

Team information
- Current team: Negeri Sembilan
- Number: 12

Youth career
- 2020–2024: Negeri Sembilan

Senior career*
Years	Team	Apps	(Gls)
2022–	Negeri Sembilan	7	(0)
2021	→ FAM-MSN (loan)	27	(0)
- * Club domestic league appearances and goals as of 10 July 2026 (UTC)

Muhammad Afiq Fitri bin Mohd Jefry (born 18 November 2002) is a Malaysian professional footballer who plays as a midfielder or left back for Malaysia Super League club Negeri Sembilan.

== Early life ==
Afiq Fitri was born in Pasir Gudang, Johor, and raised in Ampangan, Negeri Sembilan. He was a trainee at District Training Centre (PLD) SMK Ampangan, Seremban, under the National Football Development Programme (NFDP).

== Club career ==
=== Early career ===
Afiq represented Negeri Sembilan U19 in the 2020 Piala Belia. In 2021, he was loaned to FAM-MSN to compete in the Malaysia Premier League. He returned to Negeri Sembilan in 2022 and featured for the club's U21 side in the Piala Presiden. In 2023, he was promoted to Negeri Sembilan U23, where he competed in the MFL Cup.

=== FAM-MSN (loan) ===
In 2021, Afiq was loaned to FAM-MSN, where he made 20 appearances in the Malaysia Premier League.

=== Negeri Sembilan ===
Afiq made his senior debut for Negeri Sembilan on 27 July 2022 in a Malaysia Super League match against Terengganu, coming on as a 77th-minute substitute. On 12 February 2024, he was promoted to the club's first team for the 2024–25 season. He remained with Negeri Sembilan for the 2025–26 and 2026–27 seasons.

== Career statistics ==
=== Club ===
As of 10 July 2026

Club	Season	League			Cup		League Cup		Total	
Club	Season	Division	Apps	Goals	Apps	Goals	Apps	Goals	Apps	Goals
Negeri Sembilan	2022	Malaysia Super League	1	0	0	0	1	0	2	0
Negeri Sembilan	2024–25	Malaysia Super League	1	0	0	0	0	0	1	0
Negeri Sembilan	2025–26	Malaysia Super League	5	0	0	0	1	0	6	0
Negeri Sembilan	2026–27	Malaysia Super League	0	0	0	0	0	0	0	0
Negeri Sembilan	Total		7	0	0	0	2	0	9	0
FAM-MSN (loan)	2021	Malaysia Premier League	20	0	0	0	0	0	20	0
FAM-MSN (loan)	Total		20	0	0	0	0	0	20	0
Career total			27	0	0	0	2	0	29	0
