= Vinicius Leonel =

Brazilian footballer (born 1997)

Personal information
- Full name: Vinicius Leonel Ferreira Da Silva
- Date of birth: 18 April 1997 (age 29)
- Place of birth: Juiz de Fora, Minas Gerais, Brazil
- Height: 1.87 m (6 ft 2 in)
- Position: Defensive midfielder

Youth career
- Grêmio Novorizontino
- 2015: Coritiba FC

Senior career*
Years	Team	Apps	(Gls)
2016–2018	Tupi FC		
2018	Bairro da Argentina	10	(2)
2019	Figueirense-MG	1	(0)
2020–2021	Tupynambás	19	(0)
2021	→ Boa Esporte (loan)	0	(0)
2021	→ CEOV Operário (loan)	8	(1)
2021	Nova Mutum EC	10	(0)
2022	CEOV Operário	10	(1)
2023	Negeri Sembilan	0	(0)
- * Club domestic league appearances and goals as of 23 February 2023

Vinicius Leonel Ferreira Da Silva (born 18 April 1997), commonly known as Vinicius Leonel, is a Brazilian professional footballer.

== Career ==
=== Boa Esporte ===
In 2021, he was sent on loan to Boa Esporte.

=== Nova Mutum ===
After that, he signed for Nova Mutum EC.

=== Operário ===
On 5 April 2021, he signed loan deal with Operário Várzea-Grandense from Tupynambás FC.

=== Negeri Sembilan ===
On 21 February 2023, Vinicius Leonel joined Negeri Sembilan on a free transfer. Negeri Sembilan is the first time he has played abroad.
