= Tasnim Fitri =

Malaysian footballer

Personal information
- Full name: Ahmad Tasnim Fitri bin Mohd Nasir
- Date of birth: 19 January 1999 (age 27)
- Place of birth: Kota Bharu, Malaysia
- Height: 1.76 m (5 ft 9 1/2 in)
- Position: Left-back

Team information
- Current team: Wan Tendong Stable F.C.
- Number: 66

Youth career
- 2018: Felda United U21

Senior career*
Years	Team	Apps	(Gls)
2018–2020	Felda United	9	(0)
2021	Negeri Sembilan		
2022	Sarawak United		
2023	Kelantan United		
2024	PIB Shah Alam		

International career
2017–2018	Malaysia U19	10	(0)
2017–2022	Malaysia U23		
Medal record
AFF U-19 Youth Championship
First place	2018 Indonesia
Second place	2017 Myanmar
- * Club domestic league appearances and goals

Ahmad Tasnim Fitri bin Mohd Nasir (born 11 January 1999) is a Malaysian professional footballer who plays as a left-back.

== Honours ==
Malaysia U19

- AFF U-19 Youth Championship: 2018; runner-up: 2017
