= Izzuddin Roslan =

Malaysian footballer

Personal information
- Full name: Mohamad Izzuddin bin Mohd Roslan
- Date of birth: 8 December 1999 (age 26)
- Place of birth: Gombak, Selangor, Malaysia
- Height: 1.69 m (5 ft 6 1/2 in)
- Position: Midfielder

Team information
- Current team: ACeIO
- Number: 18

Youth career
- 2016: Malaysia Pahang Sports School
- 2018–2019: Kuala Lumpur City
- 2020: Perak

Senior career*
| Years | Team | Apps | (Gls) |
| 2021 | Perak | 18 | (0) |
| 2021 | → Perak II (loan) | 3 | (0) |
| 2022–2025 | Negeri Sembilan | 40 | (0) |
| 2026– | ACeIO | | |

International career^{‡}
| 2017–2018 | Malaysia U19 | 7 | (0) |
Medal record
AFF U-19 Youth Championship
| First place | 2018 Indonesia |
| Second place | 2017 Myanmar |
- * Club domestic league appearances and goals ‡ National team caps and goals as of 24 July 2021

Mohamad Izzuddin bin Mohd Roslan (born 8 December 1999) is a Malaysian professional footballer who plays as a midfielder for Malaysia Super League club Negeri Sembilan.

== Club career ==
In 2022, he joined the team Negeri Sembilan FC on a free transfer. Even though he was with team for one year, he was quickly considered an important player to the team. In particular, he helped the team secure fourth place in the Malaysia Super League in 2022. It is an impressive achievement as the team had just been promoted from the Malaysia Premier League in the previous year and had shocked the other Malaysia Super League teams as Negeri Sembilan FC was considered an underdog team. He made 18 appearances during his time with Negeri Sembilan FC.

== Honours ==
Malaysia U19

- AFF U-19 Youth Championship: 2018; runner-up: 2017
