= Hérold Goulon =

French footballer (born 1988)

Herold Goulon
Personal information
- Full name: Darry Herold Goulon
- Date of birth: 12 June 1988 (age 38)
- Place of birth: Paris, France
- Height: 1.95 m (6 ft 5 in)
- Positions: Centre-back; defensive midfielder

Youth career
- 1998–2001: Solitaires Paris
- 2001–2002: Espérance Paris
- 2002–2003: Bourget FC
- 2004–2006: Lyon
- 2006: Middlesbrough

Senior career*
Years	Team	Apps	(Gls)
2006–2008	Middlesbrough	0	(0)
2008–2010	Le Mans	37	(0)
2010–2012	Blackburn Rovers	4	(0)
2011–2012	→ Doncaster Rovers (loan)	6	(0)
2013–2014	Zawisza Bydgoszcz	24	(2)
2015–2016	Omonia	20	(2)
2016	Farul Constanța	4	(0)
2017	Doxa Katokopias	15	(1)
2017–2018	Pafos	26	(2)
2018	Ermis Aradippou	9	(0)
2019–2021	Sri Pahang	47	(11)
2022–2024	Negeri Sembilan	36	(11)

International career
2009	France U21	3	(0)
- * Club domestic league appearances and goals as of 22:57, 11 June 2024 (UTC)

Darry Herold Goulon (born 12 June 1988) is a French professional footballer.

== Club career ==
=== Middlesbrough ===
Goulon, in 2001, was selected to attend the famous Clairefontaine academy. After leaving the academy, he joined French champions Olympique Lyonnais.

After spending a year in the reserves, playing in only 3 matches, he joined English side Middlesbrough agreeing to a three-year deal. Despite the hype surrounding the signing by Middlesbrough and their supporters, including comparing the youngster to the likes of Patrick Vieira, Goulon only featured in the reserves. After going through the duration of his contract, the English club released him, without the player ever playing a match in the Premier League.

=== Le Mans ===
Goulon signed with Le Mans on the last day of the winter transfer window, and made his league debut on 7 March 2009, in a match against Nancy coming on as a substitute in the 83rd minute. The match ended in a 2–2 draw. Goulon went on to make eleven appearances for Le Mans.

Despite interests from Süper Lig side Beşiktaş Goulon remained at the club and provided an assist for Thorstein Helstad, in a 2–1 win over Nancy on 22 August 2009. However, Goulon's second season at Le Mans was marred by injuries and suspension.

At the end of the season, Goulon left Le Mans upon the expiry of his contract after refusing to extend his contract with the club. He attracted interest from Lille, Bordeaux, Grenoble, Napoli and Real Zaragoza.

=== Blackburn Rovers ===
In late September 2010, it was revealed that Goulon, now a free agent, had begun a two-week trial with Premier League club Blackburn Rovers. On 22 October 2010, Goulon signed for Rovers on a two-year deal.

Goulon made his Blackburn Rovers debut, where he came on as a substitute for Morten Gamst Pedersen in the 72nd minute, in a 2–0 win over Aston Villa on 21 November 2010. However, his time at Ewood Park was very unsuccessful, making just 4 league appearances and after a change of management at the club, it was indicated to Goulon that he would be free to talk to other clubs and was surplus to requirements. In May 2011, Goulon underwent a trial in Germany with Köln.

On 23 November 2011, Goulon signed on loan for Doncaster Rovers until the end of January 2012. Goulon made his Doncaster Rovers debut on 26 November 2011, in a 0–0 draw against Watford. After making six appearances for the club, he eventually returned to Blackburn Rovers after his loan spell ended without extending the loan deal.

At the end of the 2011–12 season, Goulon was released by the club, just weeks after being placed on a transfer list. After leaving Blackburn Rovers, Goulon went on trial at Segunda Division side Rayo Vallecano and Ligue 2 side Nantes, but did not get a contract either way.

=== Zawisza Bydgoszcz ===
On 4 July 2013, Goulon signed a two–year contract with Ekstraklasa side Zawisza Bydgoszcz after a year out of football. Goulon previously went on trial with the club. Goulon later explained his decision to play in Poland, citing playing good football.

Goulon made his Zawisza Bydgoszcz debut in the opening game of the season, where he made his first start, in a 1–0 loss against Jagiellonia Białystok. Weeks later on 2 August 2013, Goulon scored his first Zawisza Bydgoszcz goal, in a 1–1 draw against Pogoń Szczecin. Goulon's second goal came on 19 October 2013, in a 3–1 win over Wisła Kraków. However, Goulon was soon sidelined with injuries and suspension. Goulon suffered injury once again, but this time on his back. Because of this, Goulon undergo surgery on his back and did not play for the rest of the season. In his first season at Zawisza Bydgoszcz, Goulon made sixteen appearances and scored two times for the club.

The second season at Zawisza Bydgoszcz saw Goulon rehabilitating his back and returned to training in early October. Goulon then made his first appearance of the 2014–15 season on 5 October 2014, in a 3–0 loss against Pogon Szczecin. Though he appeared in the first team since making his return from injury, Goulon's future at the club became uncertain, as he attracted interests from clubs.

It was announced on 14 January 2015 that Goulon's contract with the club had come to an end. The son of the owner of Zawisza Bydgoszcz said signing Goulon was a mistake.

=== AC Omonia ===
On 20 January 2015, he signed a contract with AC Omonia.

Goulon made his AC Omonia debut on 14 February 2015, where he played eight minutes, in a 2–1 loss against Apollon Limassol. Goulon then scored his first AC Omonia goal on 17 May 2015, in a 7–1 win over Ermis Aradippou and scored again in the last game of the season against Apollon Limassol. In his first season at AC Omonia, Goulon made nine appearances and scored two times.

However, at the start of the season, Goulon suffered an injury that kept him sidelined for months. Goulon then made his first appearance of the season since recovering from injury, in a 0–0 draw against Apollon Limassol. After being at the club for almost one year, it was announced on 9 January 2016 that Goulon had left the club by mutual consent.

=== Viitorul Constanta ===
On 27 January 2016, Goulon signed for Romanian side Viitorul Constanța on a one-and-a-half-year contract. Upon joining the club, Goulon stated he could see the club being Champions as the reason he joined Viitorul Constanta.

Goulon made his Viitorul Constanta debut on 12 March 2016, playing in the centre-back, in a 1–1 draw against Pandurii Târgu Jiu. After making four more appearances, which saw Viitorul Constanta finish in fifth place, Goulon was released by the club.

=== Doxa Katokopias ===
On 31 December 2016, Goulon signed a contract with Doxa Katokopias.

=== Pahang FA ===
In the beginning of Malaysian football season 2019, Pahang FA announced his signing.

He helped Pahang FA as a central defender, as opposed of his usual position, midfielder.

He has scored three goals in Tok Gajah's jersey. In the first leg of the FA Cup semifinal, he scored from a freekick from his side of the field straight into Perak FA goal, leaving Perak's Goalkeeper, Hafizul Hakim helpless.

=== Negeri Sembilan FC ===
In 2022 he joined the team Negeri Sembilan FC on a free transfer. Has been with the team for one year and has become a key player throughout 2022. He has helped the team secure fourth place in the Malaysia Super League in 2022. It is an impressive achievement as the team has just been promoted from the Malaysia Premier League in the previous year and had shocked the other Malaysia Super League teams as Negeri Sembilan FC was considered an underdog team. He has made 19 appearances and scored 6 goals during his time with Negeri Sembilan FC in 2022. Negeri used a 3-5-2 formation with Goulon acting as a middle centre-back and operating as a sweeper.

== International career ==
On 25 May 2009, Goulon was called up, for the first time, to the France under-21 team to participate in the 2009 Toulon Tournament. He made his debut in the tournament against Qatar on 5 June 2009.

== Personal life ==
In March 2010, Goulon was placed on probation after a complaint from his girlfriend when she accused him of attacking her. The following month, Goulon was convicted and given an eight-month prison sentence and a 2500 euro fine.

== Honours ==
Zawisza Bydgoszcz

- Polish Cup: 2013–14
