= Francis Koné =

Ivorian-born Togolese footballer

Personal information
- Full name: Francis Kouassi Koné
- Date of birth: 20 November 1990 (age 35)
- Place of birth: Bondoukou, Ivory Coast
- Height: 1.89 m (6 ft 2 in)
- Position: Forward

Team information
- Current team: Kedah Darul Aman
- Number: 9

Youth career
- Séwé Sports

Senior career*
Years	Team	Apps	(Gls)
2007–2008	Rajpracha		
2008–2009	Nakhon Pathom United		
2009–2012	PTT Rayong		
2012–2013	Al-Musannah	13	(10)
2013	Navy		
2013–2015	Olhanense	5	(0)
2015	Honvéd	2	(0)
2015–2017	Slovácko	38	(6)
2017–2019	Zbrojovka Brno	14	(0)
2020	Kuala Lumpur City	10	(7)
2021	Negeri Sembilan	5	(5)
2022	Sarawak United	14	(3)
2023–	Kedah Darul Aman		

International career^{‡}
2013	Togo	2	(0)
- * Club domestic league appearances and goals as of 4 August 2021 ‡ National team caps and goals as of 7 July 2017

Francis Kouassi Koné (born 20 November 1990) is a professional footballer who plays as a forward for Malaysia Super League club Kedah Darul Aman.

He is cap-tied to Togo, where his mother was born.

== Club career ==
=== Slovácko ===
In February 2017, during a match against Bohemians 1905, Koné saved the life of opposing goalkeeper Martin Berkovec by preventing him from swallowing his tongue after he was knocked unconscious. Koné was labelled a hero and in an interview after the match revealed that it was the fourth time he saved a player's life by pulling out their tongue. For his act, he was awarded the 2017 FIFA Fair Play Award.

=== Kuala Lumpur City F.C. ===
In January 2020, Kone signed for Kuala Lumpur City. The club was recently relegated from the top division and was looking to strengthen the team forward line. Kone scored on his debut for Kuala Lumpur FA in the 89th minutes, giving Kuala Lumpur a valuable point. He scored two more goals in the next 3 matches before the COVID-19 pandemic forced the league to be suspended. Despite the reduced number of games played due to the pandemic, he still managed to become the team's top goal scorer by the end of the season.
