= Zamri Pin Ramli =

Malaysian footballer

Personal information
- Full name: Mohamad Zamri bin Pin Ramli
- Date of birth: 24 April 1991 (age 35)
- Place of birth: Kulim, Kedah, Malaysia
- Height: 1.70 m (5 ft 7 in)
- Position: Left-back

Team information
- Current team: Kedah Darul Aman
- Number: 30

Senior career*
Years	Team	Apps	(Gls)
–2014	Felda United		
2015	Young Fighters		
2017–2019	Petaling Jaya City	25	(1)
2020	Penang		
2021–2024	Negeri Sembilan	54	(1)
2024–	Kedah Darul Aman	2	(1)
- * Club domestic league appearances and goals

Mohamad Zamri bin Pin Ramli (born 24 April 1991) is a Malaysian professional footballer who plays as a left back for Malaysia A1 Semi-Pro League club Kedah Darul Aman.

== Club career ==
He is a former player of Felda United and Malaysia Indian Football Association. In 2021 he joined Negeri Sembilan FC on a free transfer. He has helped the team secure fourth place in the Malaysia Super League in 2022, just after promotion from the Malaysia Premier League On 5 March 2024, he joined Kedah Darul Aman.

== Honours ==
Penang FA

- Malaysia Premier League: 2020
