= Muhaimin Mohamad =

Malaysian footballer

Personal information
- Full name: Mohamad Muhaimin bin Mohamad
- Date of birth: 14 November 1991 (age 34)
- Place of birth: Kedah, Malaysia
- Height: 1.76 m (5 ft 9 1/2 in)
- Position: Goalkeeper

Team information
- Current team: Kedah FA
- Number: 1

Youth career
- Kedah

Senior career*
Years	Team	Apps	(Gls)
2011–2014	Kedah	0	(0)
2015	Kuala Lumpur	0	(0)
2016	PKNS	0	(0)
2016–2017	MOF	0	(0)
2018–2019	Petaling Jaya City	19	(0)
2020	Felda United F.C.	3	(0)
2021–	Negeri Sembilan	7	(0)
2024–2025	Kelantan Darul Naim	2	(0)
2025	→ Negeri Sembilan (loan)	2	(0)
2025–	Kedah FA	0	(0)
- * Club domestic league appearances and goals as of 12 May 2025

Mohamad Muhaimin bin Mohamad (born 14 November 1991) is a Malaysian footballer who plays for Malaysia A1 Semi-Pro League club Kedah FA as a goalkeeper.

== Club career ==
In 2021 he joined the team Negeri Sembilan FC on a free transfer. Has been with the team for two years and has become a backup goalkeeper throughout 2022. He has helped the team secure fourth place in the Malaysia Super League in 2022. It is an impressive achievement as the team has just been promoted from the Malaysia Premier League in the previous year and had shocked the other Malaysia Super League teams as Negeri Sembilan FC was considered an underdog team. He has made 5 appearances during his time with Negeri Sembilan FC.
