= Matheus Alves (footballer, born 1993) =

Brazilian footballer

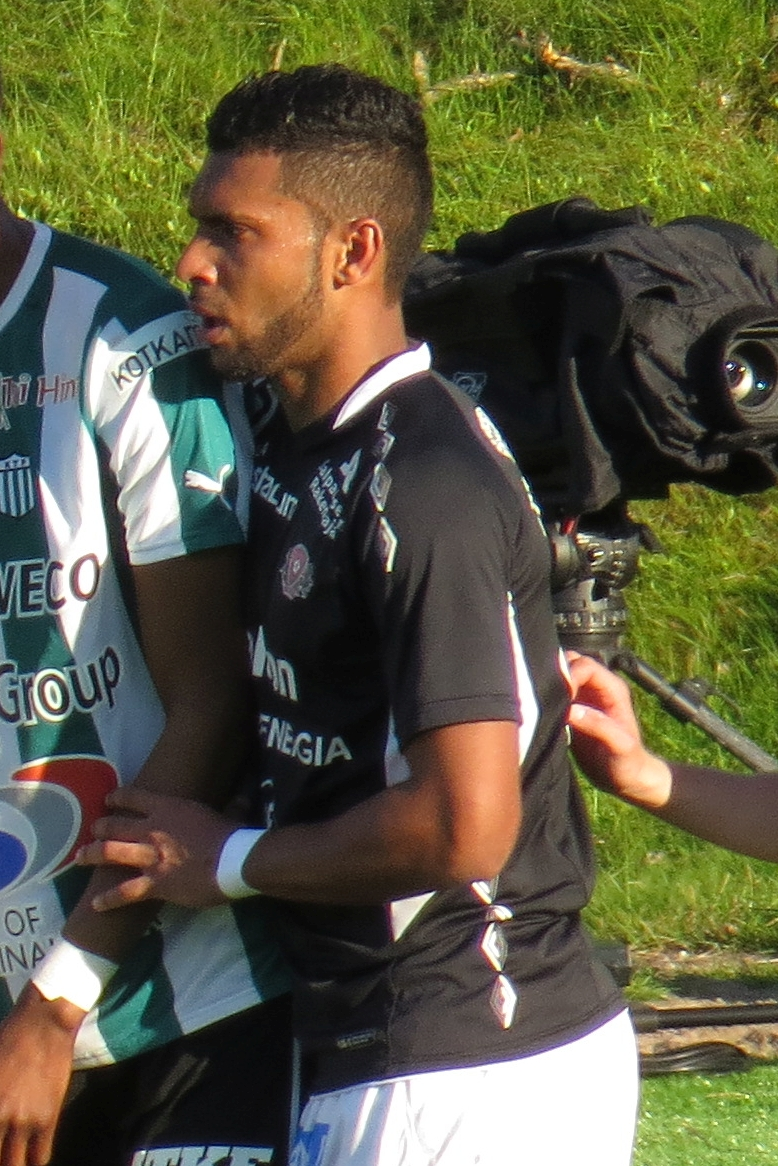

Personal information
- Full name: Matheus Alves Leandro
- Date of birth: 19 May 1993 (age 33)
- Place of birth: Cataguases, Brazil
- Height: 1.87 m (6 ft 2 in)
- Position: Forward

Youth career
- 2009–2012: Fluminense

Senior career*
Years	Team	Apps	(Gls)
2013–2017	Fluminense	0	(0)
2013–2014	→ Istres (loan)	19	(2)
2015	→ Lahti (loan)	31	(13)
2016	→ Gangwon FC (loan)	39	(12)
2017	→ Pahang (loan)	21	(18)
2018	Suwon FC	13	(2)
2018	→ Chonburi (loan)	11	(4)
2019	PT Prachuap	13	(5)
2020	Police Tero	1	(0)
2021	Chungnam Asan	15	(3)
2022	Negeri Sembilan	20	(6)
2023	Lahti	24	(6)
2024	Royal Pari	23	(8)
2025–2026	Persita Tangerang	17	(2)
- * Club domestic league appearances and goals as of 26 February 2026

Matheus Alves Leandro (born 19 May 1993) is a Brazilian professional footballer who plays as a forward.

After making a first appearance in Thai League 1 against Suphanburi, Matheus made a first hat trick on Toyota League cup game vs Muangthong United on 11 July 2018.

== Club career ==
In 2022 he joined the team Negeri Sembilan on a free transfer. Has been with the team for one year and has become a key player throughout 2022. He has helped the team secure fourth place in the Malaysia Super League in 2022. It is an impressive achievement as the team has just been promoted from the Malaysia Premier League in the previous year and had shocked the other Malaysia Super League teams because Negeri Sembilan was considered an underdog team. He has made 20 appearances and scored 6 goals during his time with Negeri Sembilan.

In March 2023, he returned to Finland to rejoin Lahti.

== Career statistics ==
As of match played 24 May 2017.

Appearances and goals by club, season and competition
Club	Season	League			National Cup		League Cup		Continental		Total	
Club	Season	Division	Apps	Goals	Apps	Goals	Apps	Goals	Apps	Goals	Apps	Goals
Istres (loan)	2013–14	Ligue 2	18	2	1	0	0	0	–		19	2
Istres (loan)	2014–15	Championnat National	1	0	1	0	0	0	–		2	0
Istres (loan)	Total		19	2	2	0	0	0	-	-	21	2
Lahti	2015	Veikkausliiga	32	12	1	0	0	0	2	1	35	13
Gangwon	2016	K League 2	29	8	0	0	–		–		29	0
Pahang	2017	Malaysia Super League	13	14	0	0	–		–		13	14
Career total			93	36	3	0	0	0	2	1	98	37
