= Gustavo (footballer, born July 1996) =

Brazilian footballer

- Gustavo with Persija in 2026

Personal information
- Full name: Gustavo Almeida dos Santos
- Date of birth: 25 July 1996 (age 30)
- Place of birth: São Paulo, Brazil
- Height: 1.85 m (6 ft 1 in)
- Position: Forward

Team information
- Current team: Java United (on loan from Persija Jakarta)
- Number: 70

Senior career*
Years	Team	Apps	(Gls)
2016	Marília	7	(1)
2017	Esportivo	10	(2)
2017	Ceres	0	(0)
2018	Esportivo	8	(0)
2018	Guarany de Bagé	4	(1)
2018	Almirante Barroso	0	(0)
2019	Doce Mel	7	(2)
2019	Vitória da Conquista	7	(1)
2020	Thep Xanh Nam Dinh	13	(2)
2020–2021	UiTM United	8	(6)
2021–2022	Kagoshima United	5	(0)
2022	Náutico	4	(0)
2022	Negeri Sembilan	13	(11)
2023	Al-Nasr	0	(0)
2023–2024	Arema	16	(14)
2023–2024	→ Persija Jakarta (loan)	7	(2)
2024–	Persija Jakarta	48	(29)
2026–	→ Java United (loan)	9	(3)
- * Club domestic league appearances and goals as of 8 November 2026

Gustavo Almeida dos Santos (born 25 July 1996), simply known as Gustavo, is a Brazilian professional footballer who plays as a forward for Indonesian Super League club Java United.

== Club career ==
=== Negeri Sembilan ===
On 10 June 2022, Gustavo joined Negeri Sembilan of the Malaysia Super League.

=== Al-Nasr ===
On 19 January 2023, Gustavo joined Al-Nasr of the Kuwait Premier League.

=== Arema ===
On 1 July 2023, Gustavo joined Liga 1 club Arema.

=== Persija (loan) ===
On 9 November 2023, Arema loaned Gustavo to Persija Jakarta until the end of the season.

=== Persjia ===
After finishing half of the season with Arema, Gustavo Almeida officially joined Persija.

=== Career statistics ===
==== Club ====
Season	Club	League	Apps	Goals
2016	Marília	Campeonato Brasileiro Série C	7	1
2017	Esportivo	Campeonato Brasileiro Série D	10	2
2017	Ceres	Campeonato Goiano	8	0
2018	Esportivo	Campeonato Brasileiro Série D	8	0
2018	Guarany de Bagé	Campeonato Gaúcho	4	1
2018	Almirante Barroso	Campeonato Catarinense	0	0
2019	Doce Mel	Campeonato Baiano	7	2
2019	Vitória da Conquista	Campeonato Baiano	7	1
2020	Thép Xanh Nam Định	V.League 1	13	2
2020–2021	UiTM United	Malaysia Super League	8	6
2021–2022	Kagoshima United	J3 League	5	0
2022	Náutico	Campeonato Brasileiro Série B	4	0
2022	Negeri Sembilan	Malaysia Super League	13	11
2023	Al-Nasr	Kuwait Premier League	0	0
2023–2024	Arema	Liga 1	16	14
2023–2024	Persija Jakarta (loan)	Liga 1	7	2
2024–	Persija Jakarta	Süper League	55	33
Career total			178	65

== Honours ==
Persija Jakarta

- Piala Presiden third place: 2026
