= 2025–26 Negeri Sembilan FC season =

Negeri Sembilan
2025–26 season
- Chairman: YAB Dato' Seri Utama Haji Aminuddin Harun
- CEO: Faliq Firdaus
- Head coach: Nidzam Jamil (until 23 February); K. Rajan (interim; from 23 February)
- Stadium: Tuanku Abdul Rahman Stadium
- Malaysia Super League: 7th
- Malaysia FA Cup: Quarter-finals
- Malaysia Cup: Quarter-finals
- Top goalscorer: League: Joseph Esso (10 goals); All: Joseph Esso (12 goals)
- Highest home attendance: 25,550 vs Selangor; 24 August 2025 & 18 October 2025
- Lowest home attendance: 908 vs Penang; 7 March 2026
Home colours	Away colours	Third colours

The 2025–26 season is Negeri Sembilan's 102nd year in their history and the 13th season in the Malaysia Super League. It is also their fourth season in the Malaysia Super League since being promoted from the Malaysia Premier League in the 2021. The club also competed in the Malaysia Cup and Malaysia FA Cup.

== Events ==
On 21 February 2025, NSFC entered into a sponsorship deal with Thai sportswear brand WARRIX, covering the club's official kits. Through this agreement, WARRIX will serve as the club's official technical partner for two seasons, 2025–26 and 2026–27. The sponsorship, worth RM1.7 million, includes support for the senior team as well as the U-23, U-20, and U-18 squads.

NSFC announced the arrival of two former Negeri Sembilan players, Norhafiz Zamani Misbah and Azmi Mohamed, as the new coaching staff for the development squads. Norhafiz was appointed as the head coach for the NSFC U-20 team, while Azmi Mohamed was appointed as the head coach for the NSFC U-18 team. Their arrival is one of the steps to polish the young prospects in Negeri Sembilan.

On 12 June 2025, YAB Dato’ Seri Utama Hj Aminuddin bin Harun, the Chief Minister of Negeri Sembilan, was appointed as the new Chairman of NSFC. The announcement was made by YTM Tunku Syed Razman, President of the PBNS. The appointment aimed to strengthen the club's leadership ahead of the 2025–26 season starting in August.

On 13 June 2025, Negeri Sembilan FC appointed Mohd Nidzam Jamil as the head coach of their Malaysia Super League team for the 2025–26 season. The appointment was officially announced by the club's chairman, YAB Dato’ Seri Aminuddin bin Harun, as part of NSFC's long-term strategic plan to build a more competitive and sustainable team.

On 14 June 2025, Negeri Sembilan FC announced the signing of three key players on free transfers for the 2025–26 season — national team forward Luqman Hakim from KV Kortrijk, goalkeeper Muhd Azri Abd Ghani from Kuala Lumpur City, and defender Ahmad Khuzaimi Piee from Selangor. The move, confirmed by club president Datuk Seri Aminuddin Harun, reflects the club's intent to improve after finishing 12th in the previous Malaysia Super League campaign.

25 August 2025 – In a dramatic Malaysia Super League clash at the Tuanku Abdul Rahman Stadium in Paroi, Negeri Sembilan came from behind to defeat Selangor 2–1. Selangor went ahead through Richmond Ankrah in the 13th minute, but Negeri Sembilan fought back in the second half, with Mio Tsuneyasu equalising in the 83rd minute before netting the winner in the 90+3rd minute to complete the comeback. The match attracted 25,550 spectators, the last time Negeri Sembilan recorded more than 20,000 in attendance was on 11 May 2022, when 22,224 fans watched their clash against Johor Darul Ta’zim.

For the first time, Negeri Sembilan held the NSFC Player Awards (APNSFC) for 2025–26 season to recognise and honour the club's top-performing players and individuals for their achievements throughout the season. The awards comprised Best Player, Best Young Player, Best Goal, Best Assist, Unsung Hero and Fans' Award.

== Players ==
=== First-team squad ===
As of 22 January 2026

Note: Flags indicate national team as defined under FIFA eligibility rules; some limited exceptions apply. Players may hold more than one non-FIFA nationality.

No.	Pos.	Nation	Player
1	GK	MAS	Syahmi Adib Haikal
2	DF	JPN	Kei Oshiro
3	DF	MAS	Azrin Afiq
4	DF	MAS	Harith Samsuri
5	DF	EQG	Luis Enrique Nsue
6	MF	MAS	Zahril Azri
7	MF	JPN	Takumi Sasaki
8	MF	MYA	Wai Linn Aung
9	FW	BIH	Jovan Motika
10	FW	MAS	Luqman Hakim
11	FW	GHA	Joseph Esso
12	MF	MAS	Afiq Fitri
13	DF	MAS	Zainal Abidin Jamil
14	MF	KOR	An Sang-su
15	DF	SGP	Amirul Adli (on loan from Tampines Rovers)
16	MF	MAS	A. Selvan

No.	Pos.	Nation	Player
17	FW	MAS	Hakimi Abdullah
18	DF	MAS	Khuzaimi Piee (Captain)
19	FW	MAS	N. Javabilaarivin
20	MF	JPN	Mio Tsuneyasu (on loan from Gainare Tottori)
21	MF	PLE	Oday Kharoub
22	GK	MAS	Aqil Razak
23	DF	MNG	Filip Andersen
24	MF	JPN	Yuichi Hirano
25	DF	MAS	Anwar Ibrahim
26	DF	MAS	Syed Zaris Irfan
27	FW	MAS	Hadin Azman
28	DF	MAS	Ariff Ar-Rasyid
29	MF	ENG	Anuar Ceesay
30	GK	MAS	Azri Ghani
35	MF	MAS	Haiqal Danish
71	MF	MAS	Haiqal Haqeemi

=== Out on loan ===
Note: Flags indicate national team as defined under FIFA eligibility rules; some limited exceptions apply. Players may hold more than one non-FIFA nationality.

No.	Pos.	Nation	Player
32	MF	MAS	Wan Kuzri (to UM-Damansara United)
37	MF	MAS	Noor Adha Zailani (to Armed Forces)
38	DF	MAS	S. Vimal Nair (to Bunga Raya)
21	MF	MAS	T. Harish (to Bunga Raya)
51	DF	MAS	Hariz Kamarudin (to Bunga Raya)
39	DF	MAS	Noor Aidil Zailani (to Armed Forces)
33	FW	MAS	Zaim Iqbal (to Kelantan Red Warrior)

== Management and technical staff ==
=== Management ===
As of 12 June 2025

Position	Staff
Chairman	(Malaysia) YAB Dato' Seri Utama Haji Aminuddin Harun
Advisory board	(Malaysia) YB Dato' Mohd Zafir Ibrahim
Advisory board	(Malaysia) YB Dato’ Hj Mohd Khidir Bin Majid
Advisory board	(Malaysia) YB Dato' Hj Mustapha Nagoor
Advisory board	(Malaysia) YBhg Dato' Masri Haji Razali
Director	(Malaysia) Abd Razak Mohd Idrus
Chief executive officer	(Malaysia) Faliq Firdaus
Chief operating officer	(Malaysia) Firdaus Bhari
Technical director	(Malaysia) Efendi Abdul Malek
Team admin & special project	(Malaysia) Muhammad Zulkhairi Shamsudin
Finance & HR	(Malaysia) Rizal Jaafar
Media	(Malaysia) Ahmad Maaroff Baharuddin
Team manager	(Malaysia) Abd Razak Mohd Idrus
Assistant manager	(Malaysia) Hamdan Othman

=== Technical staff ===
As of 10 June 2025

Position	Staff
Head coach	(Malaysia) Nidzam Jamil (13 June 2025–23 February 2026)
Head coach	(Malaysia) Rajan Koran (Interim) (Began 23 February 2026)
Assistant head coach	(Malaysia) Rajan Koran
Assistant coach	(Malaysia) Irfan Fadzil Idrus
Assistant coach	(Malaysia) Muhammad Khairul Ismail
Goalkeeper coach	(Malaysia) Megat Amir Faisal
Fitness coach	(Malaysia) Norman Baharom
Team analyst	(Malaysia) Muhammad Aiman Danial Mat Aris
Team doctor	(Malaysia) Dr. Rozaiman Ebrahim
Physiotherapist	(Malaysia) Mohamad Syaiful Sabtu
Physiotherapist	(Malaysia) Ahmad Faisal Miswan
Team coordinator	(Malaysia) Azri Raffi
Security officer	(Malaysia) Sohaimi Hasim
Masseur	(Malaysia) Zahari Mazlan
Kitman	(Malaysia) Jefri Jaafar
Kitman	(Malaysia) Sharizal Mat Sah

== Transfers ==
=== In ===
Date	Pos.	Name	From	Fee	Ref.
13 June 2025	FW	(Malaysia) Luqman Hakim	(Belgium) K.V. Kortrijk	Free	
14 June 2025	DF	(Malaysia) Khuzaimi Piee	(Malaysia) Selangor	Free	
14 June 2025	GK	(Malaysia) Azri Ghani	(Malaysia) Kuala Lumpur City	Free	
18 June 2025	FW	(Malaysia) Hakimi Abdullah	(Malaysia) Terengganu	Free	
18 June 2025	DF	(Malaysia) Ariff Ar-Rasyid	(Malaysia) Perak	Free	
23 June 2025	GK	(Malaysia) Syahmi Adib Haikal	(Malaysia) Selangor	Free (Note: He was signed on a permanent deal after spending a year on loan from Selangor in the 2024–25 season.)	
23 June 2025	DF	(Malaysia) Azrin Afiq	(Malaysia) Selangor	Free (Note: He was signed on a permanent deal after spending a year on loan from Selangor in the 2024–25 season.)	
24 June 2025	MF	(Malaysia) Haiqal Haqeemi	(Malaysia) Selangor	Free	
24 June 2025	MF	(Malaysia) Zahril Azri	(Malaysia) Kuala Lumpur Rovers	Free	
25 June 2025	DF	(Malaysia) Noor Aidil	Promoted (Note: Promoted from Negeri Sembilan U-23)		
25 June 2025	MF	(Malaysia) Noor Adha	Promoted		
25 June 2025	DF	(Malaysia) Haiqal Danish	Promoted		
25 June 2025	FW	(Malaysia) Zaim Iqbal	Promoted (Note: Promoted from Negeri Sembilan U-20)		
27 June 2025	DF	(Malaysia) Syed Zaris Irfan	(Malaysia) Sri Pahang U–23	Free	
4 July 2025	DF	(Malaysia) Anwar Ibrahim	(Malaysia) Kuala Lumpur City	Free	
4 July 2025	FW	(Bosnia and Herzegovina) Jovan Motika	(Malaysia) Kuala Lumpur City	Free	
16 July 2025	FW	(Ghana) Joseph Esso	(Ghana) Dream FC	Free	
26 July 2025	DF	(Equatorial Guinea) Luis Enrique Nsue	(Morocco) COD Meknès	Free	
1 August 2025	MF	(Myanmar) Wai Lin Aung	(Myanmar) Yangon United	Free	
30 August 2025	DF	(Mongolia) Filip Andersen	(Philippines) Loyola	Free	
Transferred in mid-season
4 January 2026	MF	(Palestine) Oday Kharoub	Unattached (Note: Most recently played for Al-Ahly SC)	Free	
4 January 2026	DF	(Japan) Kei Oshiro	(Japan) Gainare Tottori	Free	
5 January 2026	MF	(England) Anuar Ceesay	(Malaysia) UM-Damansara	Undisclosed	
19 January 2026	MF	(Malaysia) (United States) Wan Kuzri	(United States) Akron City	Free	
2 February 2026	MF	(Japan) Yuichi Hirano	(Japan) Cerezo Osaka	Free	

=== Out ===
Date	Pos.	Name	To	Fee	Ref.
31 May 2025	FW	(Myanmar) Hein Htet Aung	(Malaysia) Selangor	Loan return	
31 May 2025	GK	(Malaysia) Muhaimin Mohamad	(Malaysia) Kelantan DN	Loan return	
20 June 2025	GK	(Malaysia) Tauffiq Ar-Rasyid	(Malaysia) AAK Ultimate F.C.	Free	
1 July 2025	MF	(Senegal) Jacque Faye	Released (Note: Joined Manjung City after released)		
1 July 2025	FW	(South Korea) Lee Kwang-hui	Released		
1 July 2025	DF	(Malaysia) Annas Rahmat	Released (Note: Joined KL Rangers after released)		
1 July 2025	MF	(Malaysia) Izzuddin Roslan	Released		
1 July 2025	DF	(Malaysia) Norfiqrie Talib	Released		
1 July 2025	DF	(Malaysia) Izaffiq Ruzi	Released		
1 July 2025	FW	(Malaysia) Ikhwan Yazek	Released (Note: Joined Kelantan WTS after released)		
1 July 2025	FW	(Malaysia) Amirul Hakimi Rosli	Released		
1 July 2025	MF	(Malaysia) R. Barathkumar	(Malaysia) Kedah FA	Free	
1 July 2025	DF	(Malaysia) Che Rashid	(Malaysia) Melaka FC	Free	
1 July 2025	DF	(Malaysia) Aroon Kumar	(Malaysia) Melaka FC	Free	
24 July 2025	DF	(Malaysia) Nasrullah Haniff	(Malaysia) AAK FC	Free	
5 August 2025	FW	(Brazil) Ricardo Pires	(Thailand) Khon Kaen	Free	
31 August 2025	DF	(Nigeria) Aliyu Abu Bakar	(Malaysia) Perak FA	Free	
31 August 2025	MF	(Italy) Sebastian Avanzini	(Malaysia) Kelantan TRW	Free	
Transferred out mid-season
16 December 2025	MF	(Ghana) Alex Agyarkwa	(Malaysia) Selangor	Loan return	

=== Loan in ===
Date from	Date to	Pos.	Name	From	Ref.
4 July 2025	End of season	MF	(Japan) Mio Tsuneyasu	(Japan) Gainare Tottori	
15 July 2025	16 December 2025	MF	(Ghana) Alex Agyarkwa	(Malaysia) Selangor	
Loaned in mid-season
13 January 2026	End of season	DF	(Singapore) Amirul Adli	(Singapore) Tampines Rovers	

=== Loan out ===
Date from	Date to	Pos.	Name	To	Ref.
1 July 2025	End of season	DF	(Malaysia) S. Vimal Nair	(Malaysia) Bunga Raya	
1 July 2025	End of season	MF	(Malaysia) T. Harish	(Malaysia) Bunga Raya	
31 August 2025	31 December 2025	MF	(Malaysia) Noor Adha	(Malaysia) Machan	
Loaned out mid-season
1 January 2026	End of season	MF	(Malaysia) Noor Adha	(Malaysia) Armed Forces	
2 January 2026	End of season	MF	(Malaysia) Hariz Kamarudin	(Malaysia) Bunga Raya	
21 January 2026	End of season	MF	(Malaysia) Wan Kuzri	(Malaysia) UM-Damansara	
12 February 2026	End of season	DF	(Malaysia) Noor Aidil Zailani	(Malaysia) Armed Forces	
12 February 2026	End of season	FW	(Malaysia) Zaim Iqbal	(Malaysia) Kelantan Red Warrior	

== Competitions ==
=== Overview ===
Competition	First match	Last match	Starting round	Final position	Record							
Competition	First match	Last match	Starting round	Final position	Pld	W	D	L	GF	GA	GD	Win %
Malaysia Super League	12 August 2025	16 May 2026	Matchday 2	7th	24	6	11	7	39	35	+4	25.00
Malaysia FA Cup	18 August 2025	29 October 2025	Round of 16	Quarter-finals	4	2	0	2	8	7	+1	50.00
Malaysia Cup	17 January 2026	14 February 2026	Round of 16	Quarter-finals	4	1	1	2	2	6	−4	25.00
Total					32	9	12	11	49	48	+1	28.13

Source: Competitions

=== Malaysia Super League ===
==== League table ====
Pos	Team	Pld	W	D	L	GF	GA	GD	Pts	Qualification or relegation
1	Johor Darul Ta'zim (C)	24	23	1	0	117	10	+107	70	Qualification for the AFC Champions League Elite league stage & ASEAN Club Championship group stage
2	Kuching City	24	16	5	3	45	14	+31	53	Qualification for the AFC Champions League Two group stage & ASEAN Club Championship group stage (Note: Since the winners of the 2025 Malaysia FA Cup, Johor Darul Ta'zim, had already qualified for the Champions League Elite via league position, the Champions League Two spot was passed to the second-placed team.)
3	Selangor	24	16	4	4	59	20	+39	52	
4	Kuala Lumpur City	24	12	7	5	40	29	+11	43	
5	Terengganu	24	10	6	8	39	34	+5	36	
6	Immigration	24	9	5	10	38	43	−5	32	
7	Negeri Sembilan	24	6	11	7	39	35	+4	29	
8	Penang	24	6	7	11	26	41	−15	25	
9	Sabah	24	5	8	11	29	44	−15	23	
10	DPMM	24	6	5	13	30	57	−27	23	Ineligible for AFC competition spots
11	Melaka	24	4	7	13	18	45	−27	19	
12	Kelantan The Real Warriors (Note: MFL officially snubs Kelantan The Real Warriors club licensing approval.)	24	4	3	17	17	63	−46	15	Ejected from Malaysian Super League
13	PDRM	24	2	5	17	17	79	−62	11	Ejected from Malaysian Super League

Updated to match(es) played on 17 May 2026. Source: Malaysian Football League
Rules for classification: 1) Points; 2) Goal difference; 3) Number of goals scored.
(C) Champions

==== Results by round ====
Round	1	2	3	4	5	6	7	8	9	10	11	12	13	14	15	16	17	18	19	20	21	22	23	24	25	26
Ground	–	A	H	H	A	H	A	H	A	H	A	H	A	–	H	A	A	H	A	H	A	H	A	H	A	H
Result	–	L	W	D	D	W	L	W	D	D	L	D	W	–	L	L	L	L	D	D	W	D	D	D	D	W
Position	9	13	8	7	7	6	6	6	6	6	6	6	6	6	6	6	8	9	7	7	6	6	7	7	7	7

Updated to match(es) played on 13 May 2025. Source: 2025–26 MSL
A = Away; H = Home; W = Win; D = Draw; L = Loss; C = Cancelled

==== Results table ====
Home \ Away	DPM	IMI	JDT	KRW	KLC	KUC	MEL	NSE	PDRM	PEN	SAB	SEL	TER
DPMM								2–2					
Immigration								1–1					
Johor Darul Ta'zim								5–3					
Kelantan The Real Warriors								0–2					
Kuala Lumpur City								2–2					
Kuching City								2–0					
Melaka								2–0					
Negeri Sembilan	2–2	1–2	0–1	2–1	1–1	2–2	0–0		2–0	3–3	3–0	2–1	1–1
PDRM								1–6					
Penang								2–1					
Sabah								1–1					
Selangor								1–0					
Terengganu								2–2					

Source: MFL
Legend: Blue = home team win; Yellow = draw; Red = away team win.
For upcoming matches, an "a" indicates there is an article about the rivalry between the two participants.

==== League matches ====
Matchweek 1

Not played	Negeri Sembilan	—

Matchweek 2

12 August 2025	Johor Darul Ta'zim	5–3	Negeri Sembilan	Iskandar Puteri
20:15	Jon Irazabal 38', 56'; Figueiredo 41'; Arif Aiman 58'; Bérgson 90+1'	Report	Joseph Esso 8'; Motika 13', 60'	Stadium: Sultan Ibrahim Stadium; Attendance: 12,674; Referee: Nawal Mohammad Zubir

Matchweek 3

24 August 2025	Negeri Sembilan	2–1	Selangor	Paroi
21:00	Mio Tsuneyasu 83', 90+3'	Report	Richmond 13'	Stadium: Tuanku Abdul Rahman Stadium; Attendance: 25,550; Referee: Tuan Mohd Yaasin Tuan Mohd Hanafiah

Matchweek 4

29 August 2025	Negeri Sembilan	2–2	Kuching City	Paroi
21:00 UTC+8	Joseph Esso 79'; Luis Enrique 90+4'	Report	Danial Asri 7'; Ronald Ngah 48'	Stadium: Tuanku Abdul Rahman Stadium; Attendance: 24,828; Referee: Muhammad Zamzaidi Bin Katimin

Matchweek 5

20 September 2025	Immigration	1-1	Negeri Sembilan	Batu Kawan
17:00 UTC+8	Wilmar Jordán 26'		Jovan Motika 9'	Stadium: Penang State Stadium; Attendance: 373; Referee: RAZLAN BIN JOFFRI ALI

Matchweek 6

27 September 2025	Negeri Sembilan	3–0	Sabah	Paroi
21:00 UTC+8	Jovan Motika 26'; Alex Agyarkwa 40'; Joseph Esso 80'	Report		Stadium: Tuanku Abdul Rahman Stadium; Attendance: 20,816; Referee: Razlan Joffri Ali

Matchweek 7

4 October 2025	Penang	2–1	Negeri Sembilan	George Town
17:00 UTC+8	Kipré Tchétché 13', 49'	Report	90+9' (o.g.) Obilor	Stadium: City Stadium

=== Malaysia FA Cup ===
==== Round of 16 ====
A total of 16 teams played in the Round of 16. Ties were scheduled to be played in the week commencing 16 August 2025. The first legs were played on 16, 17 and 18 August, and the second legs were played on 12, 13 and 14 September 2025.

Key: (1) = Super League; (2) = A1 Semi-Pro League

First leg

18 August 2025
21:00 MYT

Negeri Sembilan (1)	5–0	PDRM (1)
Motika 2', 40'; Esso 45', 83'; Tsuneyasu 76'	Report

Tuanku Abdul Rahman Stadium, Paroi
Attendance: 4,506
Referee: Zamzaidi Katimin

Second leg

12 September 2025
21:00 MYT

PDRM (1)	1–0	Negeri Sembilan (1)
Fakhrul 4'	Report

Selayang Stadium, Selayang
Attendance: 1,950
Referee: Nawal Zubir

Negeri Sembilan won 5–1 on aggregate.

==== Quarter-finals ====
First leg

18 October 2025
20:30 MYT

Negeri Sembilan (1)	0–4	Selangor (1)
	Report	Faisal 34', 63'; Chrigor 46'; Clough 56'

Tuanku Abdul Rahman Stadium, Paroi
Attendance: 25,550
Referee: Kamil Zakaria

Second leg

29 October 2025
21:00 MYT

Selangor (1)	2–3	Negeri Sembilan (1)
Lira 42'; Faisal 87'	Report	Harith 12'; Javabilaarivin 27'; Tsuneyasu 80'

MBPJ Stadium, Petaling Jaya
Attendance: 7,517
Referee: Ahmad Zuhadi Dzulkifli

Selangor won 6–3 on aggregate.

=== Malaysia Cup ===
==== Round of 16 ====
The first legs were played on 17, 18 and 19 January, and the second legs were played on 22, 23, 24 and 25 January 2026.

First leg

17 January 2026
17:00 UTC+8

Immigration	0–0	Negeri Sembilan
	Report (FAM); Report (MFL)

Penang State Stadium, Batu Kawan
Attendance: 344
Referee: Kamal Ikhwan Yaacob

Second leg

25 January 2026
21:00 UTC+8

Negeri Sembilan	1–0	Immigration
Luqman 62'	Report (FAM); Report (MFL)

Tuanku Abdul Rahman Stadium, Paroi
Attendance: TBC
Referee: Tuan Mohd Yaasin

Negeri Sembilan won 1–0 on aggregate.

==== Quarter-finals ====
First leg

8 February 2026
21:00 UTC+8

Negeri Sembilan	0–1	Selangor
	Report (FAM); Report (MFL)	Chrigor 90+7' (pen.)

Tuanku Abdul Rahman Stadium, Paroi
Attendance: 9,637
Referee: Tuan Mohd Yaasin

Second leg

14 February 2026
21:00 UTC+8

Selangor	5–1	Negeri Sembilan
Faisal 2'; Fortes 24'; Laine 30'; Cheng 45+2'; Chrigor 66'	Report (FAM); Report (MFL)	Motika 74' (pen.)

MBPJ Stadium, Petaling Jaya
Attendance: 10,015
Referee: Ahmad Zuhadi Dzulkifli

Selangor won 6–1 on aggregate.

== Squad statistics ==
=== Appearances and goals ===
As of 26 May 2026

No.	Pos.	Name	League		Malaysia FA Cup		Malaysia Cup		Total		Discipline	
No.	Pos.	Name	Apps	Goals	Apps	Goals	Apps	Goals	Apps	Goals	Yellow card	Red card
1	GK	(Malaysia) Syahmi Adib Haikal	0	0	0	0	0	0	0	0	0	0
2	DF	(Japan) Kei Oshiro	11	1	0	0	3	0	14	1	2	0
3	DF	(Malaysia) Azrin Afiq	2	0	1	0	0	0	3	0	0	0
4	DF	(Malaysia) Harith Samsuri	21	0	3	1	4	0	28	1	7	0
5	MF	(Equatorial Guinea) Luis Enrique Nsue	15	1	2	0	4	0	21	1	4	0
6	DF	(Malaysia) Zahril Azri	11	0	2	0	2	0	15	0	4	0
7	MF	(Japan) Takumi Sasaki	24	3	4	0	4	0	32	3	1	0
8	MF	(Myanmar) Wai Linn Aung	13	0	2	0	1	0	16	0	3	0
9	FW	(Bosnia and Herzegovina) Jovan Motika	18	8	4	2	3	1	25	11	1	0
10	FW	(Malaysia) Luqman Hakim	18	5	2	0	4	1	24	6	0	0
11	FW	(Ghana) Joseph Esso	22	10	4	2	4	0	30	12	7	0
12	MF	(Malaysia) Afiq Fitri	5	0	0	0	1	0	6	0	0	0
13	DF	(Malaysia) Zainal Abidin Jamil	13	0	3	0	0	0	16	0	1	0
14	MF	(South Korea) An Sang-su	17	0	3	0	4	0	24	0	5	0
15	DF	(Singapore) Amirul Adli	11	0	0	0	3	0	14	0	1	0
16	MF	(Malaysia) Selvan Anbualagan	22	0	4	0	3	0	29	0	0	0
17	FW	(Malaysia) Hakimi Abdullah	9	0	2	0	2	0	13	0	1	0
18	DF	(Malaysia) Khuzaimi Piee	13	3	3	0	3	0	19	0	3	1
19	FW	(Malaysia) N. Javabilaarivin	9	0	3	1	4	0	16	0	0	0
20	MF	(Japan) Mio Tsuneyasu	23	4	4	2	1	0	28	6	0	0
21	MF	(Palestine) Oday Kharoub	9	1	0	0	3	0	12	0	3	0
22	GK	(Malaysia) Aqil Razak	0	0	0	0	2	0	2	0	2	0
23	DF	(Mongolia) Filip Andersen	6	0	2	0	0	0	8	0	1	0
24	MF	(Japan) Yuichi Hirano	7	0	0	0	2	0	9	0	0	1
25	DF	(Malaysia) Anwar Ibrahim	9	0	1	0	1	0	11	0	3	0
27	FW	(Malaysia) Hadin Azman	9	0	1	0	0	0	10	0	1	0
28	DF	(Malaysia) Ariff Ar-Rasyid	16	0	4	0	2	0	22	0	5	0
29	MF	(England) Anuar Ceesay	5	0	0	0	1	0	6	0	0	0
30	GK	(Malaysia) Azri Ghani	24	0	4	0	2	0	30	0	3	0
35	DF	(Malaysia) Haiqal Danish	3	0	1	0	0	0	4	0	1	0
–	MF	(Malaysia) Haiqal Haqeemi (Note: He was ruled out for the remainder of the season due to a long-term injury sustained in September 2025)	0	0	1	0	0	0	1	0	0	0
–	DF	(Malaysia) Syed Zaris Irfan (Note: He was ruled out for the remainder of the season due to a long-term injury sustained in August 2025)	0	0	0	0	0	0	0	0	0	0
Players transferred out during the season
15	DF	(Malaysia) Hariz Kamarudin (Note: Loaned to Bunga Raya)	0	0	0	0	0	0	0	0	0	0
24	MF	(Ghana) Alex Agyarkwa	7	1	2	0	0	0	9	1	1	0
33	FW	(Malaysia) Zaim Iqbal (Note: Loaned to Kelantan Red Warrior)	0	0	0	0	0	0	0	0	0	0
39	DF	(Malaysia) Noor Aidil Zailani (Note: Loaned to Armed Forces)	4	0	1	0	0	0	5	0	0	0

=== Goalscorers ===
As of 26 May 2026

Rank	No.	Pos.	Name	League	Malaysia FA Cup	Malaysia Cup	Total
1	11	FW	(Ghana) Joseph Esso	10	2	0	12
2	9	FW	(Bosnia and Herzegovina) Jovan Motika	8	2	1	11
3	10	FW	(Malaysia) Luqman Hakim	5	0	1	6
3	20	MF	(Japan) Mio Tsuneyasu	4	2	0	6
5	7	MF	(Japan) Takumi Sasaki	3	0	0	3
5	18	DF	(Malaysia) Khuzaimi Piee	3	0	0	3
7	2	DF	(Japan) Kei Oshiro	1	0	0	1
7	5	DF	(Equatorial Guinea) Luis Enrique Nsue	1	0	0	1
7	21	MF	(Palestine) Oday Kharoub	1	0	0	1
7	24	MF	(Ghana) Alex Agyarkwa	1	0	0	1
7	4	DF	(Malaysia) Harith Samsuri	0	1	0	1
7	19	FW	(Malaysia) N. Javabilaarivin	0	1	0	1
Totals				37	8	2	47

=== Assists ===
As of 26 May 2026

Rank	No.	Pos.	Name	League	Malaysia FA Cup	Malaysia Cup	Total
1	7	MF	(Japan) Takumi Sasaki	4	3	0	7
2	16	FW	(Malaysia) A. Selvan	3	0	2	5
3	24	MF	(Japan) Yūichi Hirano	3	0	0	3
3	24	MF	(Ghana) Alex Agyarkwa	3	0	0	3
5	17	FW	(Malaysia) Hakimi Abdullah	2	0	0	2
5	20	MF	(Japan) Mio Tsuneyasu	2	0	0	2
5	27	FW	(Malaysia) Hadin Azman	2	0	0	2
5	11	FW	(Ghana) Joseph Esso	1	1	0	2
9	6	DF	(Malaysia) Zahril Azri	1	0	0	1
9	9	FW	(Bosnia and Herzegovina) Jovan Motika	1	0	0	1
9	10	FW	(Malaysia) Luqman Hakim	1	0	0	1
9	12	MF	(Malaysia) Afiq Fitri	1	0	0	1
9	14	MF	(South Korea) An Sang-su	1	0	0	1
9	28	DF	(Malaysia) Ariff Ar-Rasyid	1	0	0	1
9	13	DF	(Malaysia) Zainal Abidin Jamil	0	1	0	1
Totals				26	5	2	33

=== Clean sheets ===
As of 26 May 2026

Rank	No.	Pos.	Name	League	Malaysia FA Cup	Malaysia Cup	Total
1	30	GK	(Malaysia) Azri Ghani	4	1	1	6
2	22	GK	(Malaysia) Aqil Razak	0	0	1	1
3	1	GK	(Malaysia) Syahmi Adib Haikal	0	0	0	0
Totals				4	1	2	7

== Foreign players ==
For the 2025–26 Malaysia Super League season, the Malaysian Football League (MFL) introduced a revised foreign player quota. Each team is allowed to register up to 15 foreign players, but only six can be used in a matchday squad. This includes four world (open) category players, one from an AFC (Asia) member country, and one from an ASEAN (Southeast Asia) country, with an additional three foreign player allowed on the bench.

=== List of foreign player ===
List of NSFC foreign player for 2025–26 season;

Year	Name	Nat	Age	Position	From	Fee	Quota
2025–present	Jovan Motika	(Bosnia and Herzegovina)	26	LW/RW/SS	Kuala Lumpur City	Free	World
2025–present	Joseph Esso	(Ghana)	28	CF/SS	Dreams FC	Free	World
2025–present	Luis Enrique Nsue	(Equatorial Guinea)	27	CB/RB/LB	COD Meknès	Free	World
2026–present	Oday Kharoub	(Palestine)	32	DM/CM/AM	Unattached		World
2026–present	Anuar Ceesay	(Wales)	23	LM/RM/AM	UM-Damansara	Free	World
2024–present	Takumi Sasaki	(Japan)	27	AM/CM/LW	Ehime FC	Free	Asia (Note: Asian players can also be registered under the International/World quota)
2024–present	An Sang-su	(South Korea)	25	CM/DM/RB	Unattached		Asia
2025–present	Mio Tsuneyasu	(Japan)	23	RW/LW/AM	Gainare Tottori	Loan	Asia
2025–present	Filip Andersen	(Mongolia)	22	CB/LB	Loyola	Free	Asia
2026–present	Kei Oshiro	(Japan)	25	CB/DM	Gainare Tottori	Free	Asia
2026–present	Yuichi Hirano	(Japan)	29	CM/DM	Cerezo Osaka	Free	Asia
2025–present	Wai Linn Aung	(Myanmar)	26	DM/CM	Yangon United	Free	ASEAN
2026–present	Amirul Adli	(Singapore)	30	RB/LB/CB	Tampines Rovers	Loan	ASEAN
Transferred out mid-season
2025	Alex Agyarkwa	(Ghana)	24	DM/CM/AM	Selangor	Loan	World

== Awards ==
=== MFL Awards ===
Award by Malaysian Football League.

==== MFL Top Goals (by rounds) ====
Round	Competition	Pos.	Player	Date	Opponent	Ref.
LS3	Malaysia Super League	MF	(Japan) Mio Tsuneyasu	24 August 2025	Selangor	
LS6	Malaysia Super League	FW	(Bosnia and Herzegovina) Jovan Motika	27 September 2025	Sabah	
LS19	Malaysia Super League	FW	(Bosnia and Herzegovina) Jovan Motika	28 February 2026	Sabah	
LS20	Malaysia Super League	FW	(Bosnia and Herzegovina) Jovan Motika	7 March 2026	Penang	
LS21	Malaysia Super League	DF	(Malaysia) Khuzaimi Piee	13 March 2026	PDRM	
QF	Malaysia FA Cup	MF	(Japan) Mio Tsuneyasu	29 September 2025	Selangor	

==== MFL Top Assists (by rounds) ====
Round	Competition	Pos.	Player	Date	Opponent	Ref.
LS4	Malaysia Super League	MF	(Malaysia) Hakimi Abdullah	29 August 2025	Kuching City	
LS6	Malaysia Super League	MF	(Japan) Mio Tsuneyasu	27 September 2025	Sabah	
LS10	Malaysia Super League	MF	(South Korea) An Sang-su	22 November 2025	Terengganu	
LS21	Malaysia Super League	MF	(Malaysia) Afiq Fitri	13 March 2026	PDRM	
LS23	Malaysia Super League	MF	(Japan) Mio Tsuneyasu	25 April 2026	Terengganu	
LS26	Malaysia Super League	MF	(Malaysia) Hadin Azman	16 May 2026	Kelantan TRW	
R16	Malaysia FA Cup	MF	(Japan) Takumi Sasaki	18 August 2025	PDRM	
QF	Malaysia FA Cup	FW	(Ghana) Joseph Esso	29 October 2025	Selangor	

==== MFL Top Saves (by rounds) ====
Round	Competition	Pos.	Player	Date	Opponent	Ref.
LS2	Malaysia Super League	GK	(Malaysia) Azri Ghani	12 August 2025	Johor Darul Ta'zim	
LS15	Malaysia Super League	GK	(Malaysia) Azri Ghani	9 January 2026	Johor Darul Ta'zim	
LS23	Malaysia Super League	GK	(Malaysia) Azri Ghani	25 April 2026	Terengganu	
QF	Malaysia FA Cup	GK	(Malaysia) Azri Ghani	29 September 2025	Selangor	

==== MFL Top Goals of the Month ====
Round	Competition	Pos.	Player	Date	Opponent	Ref.
Sep/Oct 2025	Malaysia Super League	FW	(Bosnia and Herzegovina) Jovan Motika	27 September 2025	Sabah	

=== NSFC Player Awards ===
Negeri Sembilan fans' choice award.

Best Player	Best Young Player	Best Goal	Best Assist	Unsung Hero	Fans' Award
(Bosnia and Herzegovina) Jovan Motika	(Malaysia) Luqman Hakim	(Japan) Mio Tsuneyasu (Note: 2nd and winning goal against Selangor in match 3, Malaysia Super League.)	(Ghana) Alex Agyarkwa (Note: Assist for the 2nd goal against Johor Darul Ta'zim in Match 2, Malaysia Super League.)	(Malaysia) Azri Ghani	(Japan) Takumi Sasaki
(Japan) Takumi Sasaki	(Malaysia) Luqman Hakim	(Japan) Mio Tsuneyasu	(Ghana) Alex Agyarkwa	(Malaysia) Azri Ghani	(Japan) Takumi Sasaki

== Development squads ==
=== U-20 ===
Currently plays in the President Cup tournament for 2025–26.

As of 15 May 2025

No	Pos	Nat	Names	D.O.B.	Age
1	GK	(Malaysia)	Muhammad Fareez Safwan Mohamed Nasir	10. 3. 2006	19
2	DF	(Malaysia)	Muhammad Shahril Haizat Shahrin	10. 3. 2005	20
3	DF	(Malaysia)	Muhammad Zuryhakim Mohd Zafran	16. 10. 2005	20
4	DF	(Malaysia)	Muhammad Aiman Shahrin	3. 10. 2006	19
5	DF	(Malaysia)	Muhamad Adam Baqishah Rohaini	3. 5. 2006	19
6	DF	(Malaysia)	Muhammad Denish Naufal Yuszailan	6. 12. 2006	19
7	FW	(Malaysia)	Muhammad Aiman Hazizi Abdullah	7. 5. 2006	19
8	MF	(Malaysia)	Syed Jaafar Muzakir Syed Muhamad Ali	11. 5. 2005	20
9	FW	(Malaysia)	Hani Amir Hakimi Abdul Ghani	20. 5. 2006	19
10	FW	(Malaysia)	Muhammad Muhaimin Nor Azri	7. 4. 2005	20
11	MF	(Malaysia)	Muhammad Muizzuddin Nor Azri	20. 11. 2006	19
12	MF	(Malaysia)	Muhammad Asyraaf Anwar Jufrizal	3. 8. 2007	18
13	DF	(Malaysia)	Ahmad Fahrien Haiqal Kamarulhisham	1. 2. 2007	18
14	MF	(Malaysia)	Zydani Zidane Nafrizan	24. 6. 2006	19
17	MF	(Malaysia)	Muhammad Danish Kamarul Azaman	24. 2. 2006	19
18	MF	(Malaysia)	Muhammad Adam Haris Hamizon	17. 9. 2005	20
19	MF	(Malaysia)	Ahmad Danish Ahmad Razdi	27. 6. 2006	19
20	GK	(Malaysia)	Syed Ali Uraidy Syed Hussin	04. 1. 2007	18
21	MF	(Malaysia)	Aqil Faris Shalahudin	21. 5. 2007	18
22	GK	(Malaysia)	Muhammad Afiq Hazim Mazizuan	24. 1. 2007	18
23	DF	(Malaysia)	Muhammad Adib Mohd Azwi	28. 3. 2007	18
24	DF	(Malaysia)	Muhammad Afif Imran Yusmadi	12. 4. 2006	19
25	MF	(Malaysia)	Kartikeyan T. M. Valluvan	15. 4. 2005	20

=== U-18 ===
Currently plays in the Youth Cup tournament for 2025–26.

As of 15 May 2025

No	Pos	Nat	Names	D.O.B.	Age
26	FW	(Malaysia)	Loga Kanan Ananthan	06. 12. 2007	18
27	MF	(Malaysia)	Muhammad Azri Hanif Noor	19. 11. 2007	18
28	DF	(Malaysia)	Aliff Fahmi Efendi	17. 12. 2007	18
29	DF	(Malaysia)	Aswan Adi	13. 12. 2007	18
30	DF	(Malaysia)	Muhammad Zakuan Zaidan	04. 5. 2007	18
31	GK	(Malaysia)	Sanjeevan Harikrishnan	16. 6. 2007	18
32	DF	(Malaysia)	Muhammad Darwish Iqram Abdul Rahim	10. 6. 2007	18
33	MF	(Malaysia)	Ahmad Amar Shah Ahmad Zalman	20. 4. 2007	18
34	DF	(Malaysia)	Fadlan Arman Harith Sazali	20. 1. 2007	18
35	DF	(Malaysia)	Mohammad Aliff Iskandar Shahrul Azhar	18. 1. 2007	18
36	DF	(Malaysia)	Muhammad Hazim Mohammad Ajlan	20. 7. 2007	18
37	FW	(Malaysia)	Muhammad Danish Khalishah Mohd Hisham	21. 5. 2007	18
38	MF	(Malaysia)	Mohammed Amjad Rasyadi Kamal	06. 12. 2007	18
39	MF	(Malaysia)	Muhammad Afiq Haiqal Mohd Al Hafiz	25. 9. 2007	18
40	DF	(Malaysia)	Muhammad Iman Thaqif Mohd Nazri	09. 11. 2007	18
41	GK	(Malaysia)	Muhammad Zamir Muhamad Zamri	21. 6. 2007	18
42	GK	(Malaysia)	Muhammad Aiman Hafiz Dinoor Dilienoor	10. 1. 2007	18
43	FW	(Malaysia)	Muhammad Ammar Haziq Mohd Alif Azilan	27. 5. 2007	18
44	FW	(Malaysia)	Muhammad Haziq Izani	15. 4. 2007	18
45	MF	(Malaysia)	Muhammad Iskandar Aznan	18. 12. 2007	18
46	FW	(Malaysia)	Muhammad Farish Hafiy Muhammad Azli	06. 8. 2007	18
47	MF	(Malaysia)	Zafri Haiqal Zairin	22. 3. 2007	18
48	FW	(Malaysia)	Syairil Aswad Saifullizan	28. 4. 2007	18
49	FW	(Malaysia)	Farish Haiqal Rosman	26. 3. 2007	18
50	FW	(Malaysia)	Muhammad Danny Muqriz Jummain	22. 12. 2007	18
