= Negeri Sembilan FC II =

Negeri Sembilan FC reserve football team

- Full name: Negeri Sembilan Football Club II
- Nicknames: Jang (Note: Short for Ujang, a second-person pronoun for males in Negeri Sembilan Malay.); Hobin Jang Hobin (Note: Hobin (alternatively hoben) in Negeri Sembilan Malay means "to strike".); Rusa (The Deers)
- Short name: NSFCII; NSEII
- Founded: 2026; 0 years ago
- Ground: Tampin Mini Stadium
- Capacity: 3000
- Owner: Negeri Sembilan Football Association
- Chairman: YAB Dato' Haji Ismail Lasim
- Head coach: Norhafiz Zamani
- League: Malaysia A1 Semi-Pro League
- 2026–27: A1 Semi-Pro League, TBD
- Website: www.nsfc1923.com
Home colours	Away colours

Negeri Sembilan Football Club II (Malay: Kelab Bola Sepak Negeri Sembilan II), commonly referred to as Negeri Sembilan II or simply NSFC II, is a reserve team for Negeri Sembilan FC based in Tampin, Negeri Sembilan. The club competes in the 2nd-tier division of Malaysian football, the Malaysia A1 Semi-Pro League.

== History ==
=== Aminuddin Harun era (2026) ===
In March 2026, Negeri Sembilan FC II was established as the reserve team of Negeri Sembilan FC, replacing the club's U-20s side as part of a restructuring of the club's development programme. Most of the players and coaching staff from the former U-20s team were retained. Unlike its predecessor, NSFC II no longer competed as an under-20 side, instead serving as the club's reserve team. The team was set to compete in the 2026–27 Malaysia A1 Semi-Pro League.

As part of the restructuring, the previous U-18s squad was redesignated as Negeri Sembilan FC III. Norhafiz Zamani was retained as head coach of Negeri Sembilan FC II. On 25 February 2026, Negeri Sembilan announced the selection of under-20 head coach Norhafiz Zamani, together with youth players Airiel Zafran Azrul, Aqil Faris Shalahudin, and Adam Haris Hamizon for a month-long development programme at Japanese club Gainare Tottori. The programme enabled the three players to train and undergo assessment in Japan, while Zamani joined the club staff as part of a coaching exchange. The initiative was organised to support the development of both players and coaches through international exposure.

=== Ismail Lasim era (2026–present) ===
On 14 August 2026, YAB Dato' Haji Ismail Lasim was appointed as the new chairman of Negeri Sembilan FC, succeeding YAB Dato' Seri Utama Haji Aminuddin Harun.

== Stadium ==
#	Stadium	Year
1	Tampin Mini Stadium	2026–present

In 2026, Negeri Sembilan FC II began using Tampin Mini Stadium as its home ground following the club's restructuring. The stadium had previously served as the home ground of the club's U-20s team.

== Players ==
=== Current squad ===
As of 5 September 2026

Note: Flags indicate national team as defined under FIFA eligibility rules; some limited exceptions apply. Players may hold more than one non-FIFA nationality.

No.	Pos.	Nation	Player
2	DF	MAS	Raimi Shamsul
23	DF	MGL	Filip Andersen
34	MF	MAS	Adam Haikal Azizol^{U22} (captain)
35	FW	MAS	Izrin Ibrahim^{U22}
36	FW	MAS	Danish Khalishah^{U22}
37	DF	MAS	Zuryhakim Zafran^{U22}
38	MF	MAS	Irfan Zakwan^{U22}
39	FW	MAS	J. Kishen^{U22}
40	GK	MAS	Fareez Safwan^{U22}
41	DF	MAS	Syed Zaris Irfan
42	MF	MAS	Adam Haris Hamizon^{U22}
43	DF	MAS	Denish Naufal^{U22}
44	DF	GER	Andreas Heimerl
45	MF	MAS	Hakim Hafie^{U22}

No.	Pos.	Nation	Player
46	DF	MAS	Hadif Sidry^{U22}
47	FW	MAS	Airiel Zafran^{U22}
48	MF	MAS	V. Kartikeyan^{U22}
49	FW	MAS	Muhaimin Nor Azri^{U22}
50	GK	MAS	Afiq Hazim^{U22}
51	MF	MAS	Aqil Faris^{U22}
52	DF	MAS	Haiqal Danish^{U22}
53	FW	MAS	Afiq Izzudin^{U22}
54	MF	MAS	Asyraaf Anwar Jufrizal^{U22}
56	DF	MAS	Afif Imran^{U22}
57	FW	ENG	Anuar Ceesay
58	DF	MAS	Adam Baqishah^{U22}
59	DF	MAS	Fahrien Haiqal^{U22}
60	GK	MAS	Daris Irfan^{U22}

=== Senior team and Youth Academy ===
Note: Flags indicate national team as defined under FIFA eligibility rules; some limited exceptions apply. Players may hold more than one non-FIFA nationality.

No.	Pos.	Nation	Player
2	DF	MAS	Raimi Shamsul
23	DF	MGL	Filip Andersen

== Honours ==
=== Club's top goalscorer ===
Seasons	Players	Goals
2026–27	Airiel Zafran	4

== Season by season records ==
As of 4 July 2026

Note:

- Pld = Played, W = Won, D = Drawn, L = Lost, F = Goals for, A = Goals against, Pts= Points, Pos = Position

1st or Champions 2nd or Runner-up 3rd place Promotion Relegation

Season	League									Note
Season	Division	Pld	W	D	L	F	A	Pts	Pos	Note
2026–27	A1 Semi-pro	1	0	0	1	1	2	0	11th	

== Coaching staff ==
As of 29 August 2026

Position	Staff
Team Manager	(Malaysia) Kamaruddin Ibrahim
Head coach	(Malaysia) Norhafiz Zamani Misbah
Assistant head coach	(Malaysia) Shahurain Abu Samah
Goalkeeper coach	(Malaysia) Abd Jalil Man
Fitness coach	(Malaysia) Naim Mazlan
Team doctor	(Malaysia) Nik Kamarul Arif
Physiotherapist	(Malaysia) Aim Fazli Abdul Rahim
Team Analyst	(Malaysia) Arif Aizad Yusri
Team official	(Malaysia) Yusof Amdan
Team official	(Malaysia) Bakhtiar Affendy Mokhtar
Team media	(Malaysia) Shznazri Hishamnuri

== Coaching history ==
List of Negeri Sembilan II former coaches/managers.

Tenure	Coach	Achievement
2026–present	(Malaysia) Norhafiz Zamani Misbah	
