= 2024–25 Negeri Sembilan FC season =

Negeri Sembilan
2024–25 season
- Chairman: Tunku Syed Razman Tunku Syed 'Idrus al-Qadri
- CEO: Faliq Firdaus
- Head Coach: Azzmi Aziz (began 15 February 2024); K. Nanthakumar (began 16 August 2024)
- Stadium: Tuanku Abdul Rahman Stadium
- Super League: 12th
- Malaysia FA Cup: Round of 16
- Malaysia Cup: Quarter-finals
- Top goalscorer: League: (5 goals); Jacque Faye; All: (6 goals); Selvan Anbualagan
- Highest home attendance: 4,717 vs Johor Darul Ta'zim; 1 November 2024
- Lowest home attendance: 248 vs PDRM; 24 November 2024
| Home colours | Away colours | Third colours |

The 2024–25 season was Negeri Sembilan's 101st year in their history and the 12th season in the Malaysia Super League since it was first introduced in 2004. Also, it is the third season in the Malaysia Super League since being promoted from the Malaysia Premier League in 2021. Along with the league, the club also compete in the Malaysia Cup and Malaysia FA Cup in 2024–25.

== Events ==
Malaysia Super League started in May 2024 and this is the first season to have a two-year schedule, since the 2007–08. This system has been changed from the old Malaysian league match schedule system, so it's coordinate the same scheduling with the AFC calendar.

On January 12, Faliq Firdaus was appointed as the new chief executive officer of Negeri Sembilan FC. He became the youngest CEO in the Malaysia Super League competition for the 2024–25 season.

On February 15, Negeri Sembilan announced the appointment of a new Technical Director, Efendi Malek. He is a former Negeri Sembilan player and has played for nine years. In the field of coaching, Efendi holds an AFC/FAM Diploma "A" Coaching Certificate and has served as Head Coach of the Mokhtar Dahari Academy (AMD) U-16 Elite Squad in Gambang, Pahang.

On February 20, NSFC announced a collaboration with ATF Sport Taiping, a sports tape brand made in Malaysia. Through this collaboration, ATF became the official sports tape partner of the NSFC squad for the 2024–2025 season and became a supplier of various types of quality sports tape, such as rigid tape, kinesio tape, sports bandages, underwraps, healing boots, and physiotherapy bags.

On April 22, NSFC announced the appointment of Azzmi Aziz as their head coach for the 2024–25 season.

== Players ==
=== First-team squad ===
As of 1 December 2024

Note: Flags indicate national team as defined under FIFA eligibility rules; some limited exceptions apply. Players may hold more than one non-FIFA nationality.

| No. | Pos. | Nation | Player |
|---|---|---|---|
| 1 | GK | MAS | Tauffiq Ar-Rasyid |
| 2 | DF | MAS | Che Rashid |
| 3 | DF | MAS | Azrin Afiq^{U23} (on loan from Selangor) |
| 4 | DF | MAS | Aroon Kumar |
| 5 | DF | MAS | Annas Rahmat (Vice-captain) |
| 6 | DF | NGR | Aliyu Abubakar^{I} |
| 7 | MF | JPN | Takumi Sasaki^{A} |
| 9 | FW | BRA | Ricardo Pires^{I} |
| 10 | FW | MYA | Hein Htet Aung^{S} (on loan from Selangor) |
| 12 | MF | MAS | R. Barathkumar (3rd captain) |
| 13 | FW | MAS | Ikhwan Yazek |
| 14 | MF | SEN | Jacque Faye^{I} |
| 15 | DF | MAS | Hariz Kamarudin |
| 16 | MF | MAS | A. Selvan |
| 17 | DF | MAS | Nasrullah Haniff (Captain) |
| 18 | MF | MAS | Afiq Fitri^{U23} |
| 19 | FW | MAS | N. Javabilaarivin |
| 20 | DF | MAS | Norfiqrie Talib |
| 21 | GK | MAS | Syahmi Adib Haikal^{U23} (on loan from Selangor) |

| No. | Pos. | Nation | Player |
|---|---|---|---|
| 22 | GK | MAS | Aqil Razak |
| 23 | DF | MAS | Izaffiq Ruzi |
| 24 | DF | MAS | Harith Samsuri |
| 25 | MF | MAS | Izzuddin Roslan |
| 26 | MF | MAS | Amirul Hakimi Rosli^{U23} |
| 27 | FW | MAS | Hadin Azman |
| 28 | DF | MAS | Zainal Abidin Jamil |
| 30 | MF | ITA | Sebastian Avanzini^{I} |
| 31 | GK | MAS | Azeem Farhan^{U23} |
| 33 | MF | KOR | Lee Kwang-Hui^{A} |
| 36 | FW | MAS | Harish Thigarajah^{U20} |
| 37 | MF | MAS | Noor Adha Zailani^{U20} |
| 38 | DF | MAS | Vimal Sugu^{U23} |
| 39 | FW | MAS | Khairol Izham Aluwi^{U20} |
| 40 | MF | KOR | An Sang-Su^{A} |
| 42 | MF | MAS | Adam Haris^{U20} |
| 43 | FW | MAS | Zaim Iqbal^{U20} |
| 71 | GK | MAS | Muhaimin Mohamad (on loan from Kelantan Darul Naim) |

Remarks:
^{I} International player. ^{A} Asian player. ^{S} ASEAN player. ^{U23} Under-23 player. ^{U20} Under-20 player. ^{U18} Under-18 player.

=== Out on loan ===
Note: Flags indicate national team as defined under FIFA eligibility rules; some limited exceptions apply. Players may hold more than one non-FIFA nationality.

| No. | Pos. | Nation | Player |

== Management Team ==
As of 11 May 2024

| Position | Staff |
|---|---|
| Chairman | (Malaysia) Tunku Syed Razman Tunku Syed 'Idrus al-Qadri |
| Chief executive officer | (Malaysia) Faliq Firdaus |
| Chief operating officer | (Malaysia) Firdaus Bahri |
| Technical director | (Malaysia) Efendi Abdul Malek (February 2024–August 2024) |
| Technical director | (Malaysia) Azzmi Aziz (began August 2024) |
| Head coach | (Malaysia) Azzmi Aziz (April 2024–August 2024) |
| Head coach | (Malaysia) K. Nanthakumar (began August 2024) |
| Assistant head coach | (Malaysia) K. Nanthakumar (April 2024–August 2024) |
| Assistant head coach | (Malaysia) Efendi Abdul Malek (began August 2024) |
| Assistant coach | (Malaysia) Kamal Daut (April 2024–August 2024) |
| Assistant coach | (Malaysia) Rajan Koran (began August 2024) |
| Goalkeeper coach | (Malaysia) Mohd Hamsani Ahmad (March 2024–August 2024) |
| Goalkeeper coach | (Malaysia) Megat Amir Faisal (began August 2024) |
| Fitness coach | (Malaysia) Ahmad Nizan (pre-season–mid-season) |
| Fitness coach | (Malaysia) Norman Baharom (began mid-season) |
| Team doctor | (Malaysia) Dr. Zakwan Ahmad (pre-season–mid-season) |
| Team doctor | (Malaysia) Dr. Rozaiman Ebrahim |
| Physiotherapist | (Malaysia) Fakhrusy Syakirin Bin Yaacob (pre-season–mid-season) |
| Physiotherapist | (Malaysia) Mohamad Syaiful Sabtu (began mid-season) |
| Media officer | (Malaysia) Muhammad Suffi Zharith Sahar (pre-season–mid-season) |
| Media officer | (Malaysia) Ahmad Maaroff Baharuddin (began mid-season) |
| Team security | (Malaysia) Anuar Abd Rahman (pre-season–mid-season) |
| Team security | (Malaysia) Affzanisham Mohamad Sham (began mid-season) |
| Team analyst | (Malaysia) Muhammad Aiman Danial Mat Aris |
| Masseur | (Malaysia) Mohd Khalid bin Mohamed Sain (pre-season–mid-season) |
| Masseur | (Malaysia) Zahari Mazlan |
| Kitman | (Malaysia) Sharizal Mat Shah (pre-season–mid-season) |
| Kitman | (Malaysia) Muhamad Firdaus Kamaruzli |

== Transfers ==
=== In ===
| Date | Pos. | Name | From | Fee | Ref. |
|---|---|---|---|---|---|
| 30 November 2023 | GK | (Malaysia) Kaharuddin Rahman | (Malaysia) SAINS | Loan return | |
| 30 November 2023 | GK | (Malaysia) T. Shaheeswaran | (Malaysia) Perak | Loan return | |
| 30 November 2023 | FW | (Malaysia) Javabilaarivin Nyanasegar | (Malaysia) Immigration | Loan return | |
| 13 February 2024 | DF | (Malaysia) Harith Samsuri | Promoted (Note: Promoted from Negeri Sembilan U-23) | | |
| 8 March 2024 | FW | (Malaysia) Hadin Azman | (Malaysia) Penang | Free | |
| 9 March 2024 | FW | (Malaysia) Alifh Aiman | (Malaysia) PDRM | Free | |
| 10 March 2024 | FW | (Malaysia) Dzulfahmi Abdul Hadi | (Malaysia) PDRM | Free | |
| 10 March 2024 | FW | (Malaysia) Ikhwan Yazek | (Malaysia) Kelantan | Free | |
| 11 March 2024 | MF | (Senegal) Jacque Faye | (Malaysia) PDRM | Free | |
| 11 March 2024 | MF | (Japan) Takumi Sasaki | (Japan) Ehime FC | Free | |
| 12 March 2024 | DF | (Nigeria) Aliyu Abubakar | (Kazakhstan) Khan Tengri | Free | |
| 13 March 2024 | DF | (Malaysia) Izaffiq Ruzi | (Malaysia) PDRM | Free | |
| 15 March 2024 | GK | Aqil Razak | (Malaysia) PDRM | Free | |
| 15 March 2024 | DF | (Malaysia) Norfiqrie Talib | (Malaysia) PDRM | Free | |
| 3 April 2024 | MF | (South Korea) An Sang-Su | Unattached (Note: Most recently played for Cheongju FC) | Free | |
| 24 April 2024 | FW | (Spain) Mika | (Finland) KTP | Free | |
| May 2024 | FW | (South Korea) Lee Kwang-Hui | Unattached (Note: Most recently played for Goyang KH) | Free | |
Transferred in mid-season
| 20 September 2024 | MF | (Italy) Sebastian Avanzini | Unattached (Note: Most recently played for KL City) | Free | |
| 26 September 2024 | FW | (Brazil) Ricardo Pires | (Thailand) Kanchanaburi | Free | |
| 12 October 2024 | GK | (Malaysia) Muhaimin Mohamad | (Malaysia) Kelantan DN | Loan return | |

=== Out ===
| Date | Pos. | Name | To | Fee | Ref. |
|---|---|---|---|---|---|
| 22 December 2023 | DF | (Malaysia) Tommy Mawat | (Malaysia) Perak | Free | |
| 31 December 2023 | GK | (Malaysia) Sikh Izhan | (Malaysia) Selangor | Loan return | |
| 3 February 2024 | DF | (France) Hérold Goulon | Released | | |
| 3 February 2024 | FW | (Brazil) Casagrande | Released | | |
| 3 February 2024 | FW | (Spain) Youssef Ezzejjari | Released (Note: Joined Visakha FC after release) | | |
| 21 February 2024 | FW | (Malaysia) Sean Selvaraj | (Malaysia) Sri Pahang | Free | |
| 29 February 2024 | DF | (Malaysia) Farid Nezal | Released (Note: Joined Melaka FC after release) | | |
| 29 February 2024 | FW | (Malaysia) Shahrel Fikri | (Malaysia) PDRM | Free | |
| 1 March 2024 | FW | (Malaysia) Mahalli Jasuli | (Malaysia) KL City | Free | |
| 1 March 2024 | MF | (Malaysia) Saiful Ridzuwan | Released (Note: Joined Gombak F.C. after release) | | |
| 1 March 2024 | GK | (Malaysia) T. Shaheeswaran | (Malaysia) Melaka FC | Free | |
| 1 March 2024 | GK | (Malaysia) Kaharuddin Rahman | Retired (Note: Retired after 14 years playing for the club.) | | |
| 2 March 2024 | MF | (Malaysia) Hasbullah Abu Bakar | (Malaysia) Kedah | Free | |
| 3 March 2024 | GK | (Malaysia) Firdaus Irman | (Malaysia) Perak | Free | |
| 4 March 2024 | MF | (Malaysia) Fahmi Faizal | Released (Note: Joined Melaka F.C. after release) | | |
| 5 March 2024 | DF | (Malaysia) Zamri Pin Ramli | (Malaysia) Kedah | Free | |
| 6 March 2024 | MF | (Malaysia) Hafiz Ramdan | Released (Note: Joined PT Athletic after release) | | |
| 7 March 2024 | DF | (Malaysia) Filemon Anyie | (Malaysia) Kuching City | Free | |
| 11 March 2024 | FW | (Malaysia) Zaquan Adha | Released (Note: Retired after being released) | | |
Transferred out mid-season
| 21 September 2024 | FW | (Spain) Mika | Released (Note: Joined Zhenis after release) | | |
| 31 February 2025 | FW | (Malaysia) Alifh Aiman (Note: Released after A1 Semi-Pro ended, following the completion of his loan spell at Bunga Raya Damansara) | Released | | |
| 31 February 2025 | MF | (Malaysia) Dzulfahmi Hadi (Note: Released after A1 Semi-Pro ended, following the completion of his loan spell at Gombak FC) | Released | | |

=== Loan in ===
| Date from | Date to | Pos. | Name | From | Ref. |
|---|---|---|---|---|---|
| 7 March 2024 | End of season | FW | (Myanmar) Hein Htet Aung | (Malaysia) Selangor | |
| 9 March 2024 | End of season | GK | (Malaysia) Syahmi Adib | (Malaysia) Selangor | |
| 13 March 2024 | End of season | DF | (Malaysia) Azrin Afiq | (Malaysia) Selangor | |
Loaned in mid-season
| 12 October 2025 | End of season | GK | (Malaysia) Muhaimin Mohamad | (Malaysia) Kelantan DN | |

=== Loan out ===
| Date from | Date to | Pos. | Name | To | Ref. |
Loaned out mid-season
| 25 September 2024 | End of season | MF | (Malaysia) Dzulfahmi Hadi | (Malaysia) Gombak F.C. | |
| 26 September 2024 | End of season | FW | (Malaysia) Alifh Aiman | (Malaysia) Bunga Raya Damansara | |

== Competitions ==
=== Malaysia Super League ===
==== League table ====
| Pos | Team | Pld | W | D | L | GF | GA | GD | Pts | Qualification or relegation |
|---|---|---|---|---|---|---|---|---|---|---|
| 1 | Johor Darul Ta'zim (C) | 24 | 23 | 1 | 0 | 90 | 8 | +82 | 70 | Qualification for the AFC Champions League Elite league stage & ASEAN Club Championship |
| 2 | Selangor | 24 | 16 | 4 | 4 | 44 | 16 | +28 | 52 | Qualification for the AFC Champions League Two group stage & ASEAN Club Championship (Note: Since the winners of the 2024 Malaysia FA Cup (Johor Darul Ta'zim) qualified for AFC competition based on their league positions, the berth is awarded to the 2nd-placed team in the league.) |
| 3 | Sabah | 24 | 11 | 7 | 6 | 41 | 33 | +8 | 40 | |
| 4 | Kuching City | 24 | 10 | 9 | 5 | 38 | 28 | +10 | 39 | |
| 5 | Terengganu | 24 | 9 | 8 | 7 | 35 | 26 | +9 | 35 | |
| 6 | Kuala Lumpur City | 24 | 11 | 4 | 9 | 40 | 33 | +7 | 31 (Note: On 5 Aug 2024, Kuala Lumpur City were deducted six points for inaccurate or false declarations in their club licensing application.) | |
| 7 | Perak | 24 | 8 | 6 | 10 | 36 | 36 | 0 | 30 | Withdrawn from Super League (Note: Perak and Sri Pahang withdrew at end of season and dissolved. Not applying for a national licence.) |
| 8 | Sri Pahang | 24 | 7 | 8 | 9 | 35 | 39 | −4 | 29 | Withdrawn from Super League |
| 9 | PDRM | 24 | 7 | 6 | 11 | 24 | 35 | −11 | 27 | |
| 10 | Penang | 24 | 6 | 8 | 10 | 31 | 38 | −7 | 26 | |
| 11 | Kedah Darul Aman (Note: MFL officially snubs Kedah Darul Aman club licensing approval.) | 24 | 6 | 6 | 12 | 21 | 51 | −30 | 21 (Note: On 5 April 2024, Kedah Darul Aman were deducted three points for failing to pay players and staff on time following previous MFL rules breaches in the 2023 season.) | Ejected from Super League and relegated to A1 Semi-Pro League |
| 12 | Negeri Sembilan | 24 | 4 | 4 | 16 | 23 | 49 | −26 | 16 | |
| 13 | Kelantan Darul Naim | 24 | 2 | 1 | 21 | 16 | 82 | −66 | 7 | |

Source: MFL
Rules for classification: 1) Points; 2) Goal difference; 3) Goals scored;
(C) Champions

==== Results by round ====
| Round | 1 | 2 | 3 | 4 | 5 | 6 | 7 | 8 | 9 | 10 | 11 | 12 | 13 | 14 | 15 | 16 | 17 | 18 | 19 | 20 | 21 | 22 | 23 | 24 | 25 | 26 |
|---|---|---|---|---|---|---|---|---|---|---|---|---|---|---|---|---|---|---|---|---|---|---|---|---|---|---|
| Ground | – | A | A | H | A | A | A | H | A | H | A | H | A | – | H | H | A | H | H | H | H | A | A | H | A | H |
| Result | – | L | L | L | W | L | L | L | D | L | D | L | D | – | L | L | L | W | L | L | L | W | D | L | W | L |
| Position | 9 | 11 | 13 | 13 | 13 | 13 | 12 | 12 | 12 | 12 | 12 | 13 | 12 | 13 | 13 | 13 | 13 | 12 | 12 | 12 | 12 | 12 | 12 | 12 | 12 | 12 |

Updated to match(es) played on 13 May 2025. Source: 2024–25 MSL
A = Away; H = Home; W = Win; D = Draw; L = Loss

==== Results table ====
| Home \ Away | JDT | KDA | KDN | KLC | KUC | NSE | PDRM | PEN | PRK | SAB | SEL | SRP | TER |
|---|---|---|---|---|---|---|---|---|---|---|---|---|---|
| Johor Darul Ta'zim | | | | | | 3–1 | | | | | | | |
| Kedah Darul Aman | | | | | | 2–2 | | | | | | | |
| Kelantan Darul Naim | | | | | | 1–2 | | | | | | | |
| Kuala Lumpur City | | | | | | 2–1 | | | | | | | |
| Kuching City | | | | | | 1–1 | | | | | | | |
| Negeri Sembilan | 0–4 | 2–0 | 2–3 | 0–3 | 1–3 | | 1–2 | 0–2 | 0–1 | 1–2 | 0–4 | 2–1 | 0–2 |
| PDRM | | | | | | 2–1 | | | | | | | |
| Penang | | | | | | 2–2 | | | | | | | |
| Perak | | | | | | 0–0 | | | | | | | |
| Sabah | | | | | | 2–0 | | | | | | | |
| Selangor | | | | | | 4–0 | | | | | | | |
| Sri Pahang | | | | | | 0–2 | | | | | | | |
| Terengganu | | | | | | 3–2 | | | | | | | |

Source: MFL
Legend: Blue = home team win; Yellow = draw; Red = away team win.
For upcoming matches, an "a" indicates there is an article about the rivalry between the two participants.

=== Malaysia Cup ===
==== Round of 16 ====
First leg

24 November 2024
21:00 UTC+8

| Negeri Sembilan | 1–2 | PDRM |
|---|---|---|
| Selvan 69' | Report | Hadi 90+6'; Ifedayo 90+8' |

Tuanku Abdul Rahman Stadium, Paroi
Attendance: 248
Referee: Fitri Maskon

Second leg

29 November 2024
20:30 UTC+8

| PDRM | 0–3 | Negeri Sembilan |
|---|---|---|
| | Report | Eizrul 8' (o.g.); Hadin 53'; Selvan 80' |

Selayang Stadium, Selayang
Attendance: 167
Referee: Tuan Mohd Yaasin

Negeri Sembilan won 4–2 on aggregate.

==== Quarter-final ====
First leg

14 December 2024
17:00 UTC+8

| Negeri Sembilan | 0–2 | Terengganu |
|---|---|---|
| | Report | Safawi 20'; Bonilla 86' (pen.) |

Tuanku Abdul Rahman Stadium, Paroi
Attendance: 1,040
Referee: Usaid Jamal

Second leg

21 December 2024
21:00 UTC+8

| Terengganu | 4–2 | Negeri Sembilan |
|---|---|---|
| Akhyar 41'; Safawi 45+5'; Azam 82'; Shahrul 90+4' (pen.) | Report | Hadin 25' (pen.); Selvan 34' |

Sultan Mizan Zainal Abidin Stadium, Kuala Nerus
Attendance: 6,225
Referee: Hasrol Amir

Terengganu won 6–2 on aggregate.

=== Malaysia FA Cup ===
==== Round of 16 ====
| 15 June 2024 | Selangor (1) | 4–0 | Negeri Sembilan (1) | Petaling Jaya |
| 17:30 UTC+8 | Orozco 6', 14'; Fortes 44', 67' | Report | | Stadium: MBPJ Stadium; Attendance: 9,861; Referee: Nafeez Abd Wahab |

== Statistics ==
=== Appearances and goals ===
As of 12 May 2025

| No. | Pos | Nat | Player | Total | | League | | Malaysia Cup | | Malaysia FA Cup | |
| No. | Pos | Nat | Player | Apps | Goals | Apps | Goals | Apps | Goals | Apps | Goals |
|---|---|---|---|---|---|---|---|---|---|---|---|
| 1 | GK | (Malaysia) MAS | Tauffiq Ar Rasyid | 5 | 0 | 3 | 0 | 2 | 0 | 0 | 0 |
| 2 | DF | (Malaysia) MAS | Che Rashid Che Halim | 21 | 0 | 16 | 0 | 4 | 0 | 1 | 0 |
| 3 | DF | (Malaysia) MAS | Azrin Afiq | 13 | 0 | 13 | 0 | 0 | 0 | 0 | 0 |
| 4 | DF | (Malaysia) MAS | Aroon Kumar | 22 | 0 | 18 | 0 | 3 | 0 | 1 | 0 |
| 5 | DF | (Malaysia) MAS | Annas Rahmat | 18 | 1 | 13 | 1 | 4 | 0 | 1 | 0 |
| 6 | DF | (Nigeria) NGR | Aliyu Abubakar | 14 | 0 | 13 | 0 | 1 | 0 | 0 | 0 |
| 7 | FW | (Japan) JPN | Takumi Sasaki | 27 | 2 | 23 | 2 | 4 | 0 | 0 | 0 |
| 9 | FW | (Brazil) BRA | Ricardo Pires | 12 | 0 | 10 | 0 | 2 | 0 | 0 | 0 |
| 10 | FW | (Myanmar) MYA | Hein Htet Aung | 26 | 4 | 22 | 4 | 4 | 0 | 0 | 0 |
| 12 | MF | (Malaysia) MAS | R. Barathkumar | 21 | 2 | 19 | 2 | 2 | 0 | 0 | 0 |
| 13 | FW | (Malaysia) MAS | Ikhwan Yazek | 24 | 0 | 20 | 0 | 3 | 0 | 1 | 0 |
| 14 | MF | (Senegal) SEN | Jacque Faye | 26 | 5 | 21 | 5 | 4 | 0 | 1 | 0 |
| 15 | MF | (Malaysia) MAS | Hariz Kamarudin | 12 | 0 | 11 | 0 | 0 | 0 | 1 | 0 |
| 16 | MF | (Malaysia) MAS | Selvan Anbualagan | 19 | 6 | 15 | 3 | 4 | 3 | 0 | 0 |
| 17 | DF | (Malaysia) MAS | Nasrullah Haniff | 17 | 1 | 14 | 1 | 2 | 0 | 1 | 0 |
| 18 | MF | (Malaysia) MAS | Afiq Fitri | 1 | 0 | 1 | 0 | 0 | 0 | 0 | 0 |
| 19 | FW | (Malaysia) MAS | Javabilaarivin Nyanasegar | 3 | 0 | 2 | 0 | 0 | 0 | 1 | 0 |
| 20 | DF | (Malaysia) MAS | Norfiqrie Talib | 17 | 0 | 13 | 0 | 3 | 0 | 1 | 0 |
| 21 | GK | (Malaysia) MAS | Syahmi Adib | 3 | 0 | 1 | 0 | 1 | 0 | 1 | 0 |
| 22 | GK | (Malaysia) MAS | Aqil Razak | 20 | 0 | 19 | 0 | 1 | 0 | 0 | 0 |
| 23 | DF | (Malaysia) MAS | Izaffiq Ruzi | 4 | 0 | 4 | 0 | 0 | 0 | 0 | 0 |
| 24 | DF | (Malaysia) MAS | Harith Samsuri | 16 | 1 | 14 | 1 | 1 | 0 | 1 | 0 |
| 25 | MF | (Malaysia) MAS | Izzuddin Roslan | 13 | 0 | 11 | 0 | 2 | 0 | 0 | 0 |
| 26 | MF | (Malaysia) MAS | Hakimi Rosli | 0 | 0 | 0 | 0 | 0 | 0 | 0 | 0 |
| 27 | MF | (Malaysia) MAS | Hadin Azman | 16 | 3 | 12 | 1 | 3 | 2 | 1 | 0 |
| 28 | DF | (Malaysia) MAS | Zainal Abidin Jamil | 23 | 0 | 19 | 0 | 4 | 0 | 0 | 0 |
| 30 | MF | (Italy) ITA | Sebastian Avanzini | 12 | 2 | 10 | 2 | 2 | 0 | 0 | 0 |
| 33 | MF | (South Korea) KOR | Lee Kwang-hui | 0 | 0 | 0 | 0 | 0 | 0 | 0 | 0 |
| 38 | DF | (Malaysia) MAS | Vimal Sugu | 7 | 0 | 5 | 0 | 2 | 0 | 0 | 0 |
| 40 | MF | (South Korea) KOR | An Sang-su | 11 | 0 | 11 | 0 | 0 | 0 | 0 | 0 |
| 42 | MF | (Malaysia) MAS | Adam Haris | 3 | 0 | 2 | 0 | 1 | 0 | 0 | 0 |
| 50 | FW | (Malaysia) MAS | Akif Afizi | 1 | 0 | 1 | 0 | 0 | 0 | 0 | 0 |
| 71 | GK | (Malaysia) MAS | Muhaimin Mohamad | 2 | 0 | 2 | 0 | 0 | 0 | 0 | 0 |
Players transferred out during the season
| 9 | FW | (Spain) ESP | Mika | 9 | 1 | 8 | 1 | 0 | 0 | 1 | 0 |
| 11 | FW | (Malaysia) MAS | Dzulfahmi Abdul Hadi (Note: Loaned to Gombak F.C.) | 3 | 0 | 3 | 0 | 0 | 0 | 0 | 0 |
| 29 | FW | (Malaysia) MAS | Alifh Aiman (Note: Loaned to Bunga Raya) | 4 | 0 | 4 | 0 | 0 | 0 | 0 | 0 |

=== Clean sheets ===
As of match played 12 May 2025

| Rank | No. | Pos. | Player | League | Malaysia Cup | Malaysia FA Cup | Total |
|---|---|---|---|---|---|---|---|
| 1 | 22 | GK | (Malaysia) Aqil Razak | 3 | 0 | 0 | 3 |
| 2 | 21 | GK | (Malaysia) Syahmi Adib | 1 | 0 | 0 | 1 |
| 3 | 1 | GK | (Malaysia) Tauffiq Ar Rasyid Johar | 0 | 1 | 0 | 1 |
| 4 | 71 | GK | (Malaysia) Muhaimin Mohamad | 0 | 0 | 0 | 0 |
| Totals | | | | 4 | 1 | 0 | 5 |

== Development squads ==
=== U-23 squad ===
Currently plays in the MFL Cup tournament for 2024–25. This reserve league dedicated to players under the age of 23. The MFL has also allowed a quota of 5 over-age players, including 3 foreign players in each team with only 2 players allowed to play for each match.

As of 24 May 2024

| No | Pos | Nat | Names | D.O.B | Age |
|---|---|---|---|---|---|
| 1 | GK | (Malaysia) | Navind Raj Gnanasegaran | 11.04.2001 | 23 |
| 4 | DF | (Malaysia) | Muhammad Azizan Ab Khalid | 08.09.2002 | 22 |
| 5 | MF | (Malaysia) | Krishna Thasan | 27.06.2002 | 22 |
| 6 | DF | (Malaysia) | Dalan Rajendran | 29.03.2002 | 22 |
| 7 | FW | (Malaysia) | Saranraj Kala Arasu | 20.10.2002 | 22 |
| 8 | MF | (Malaysia) | Muhammad Adam Haris Hamizon | 17.09.2005 | 19 |
| 10 | MF | (Malaysia) | Kumar Chandran | 15.11.2003 | 21 |
| 11 | DF | (Malaysia) | Vimal Nair Sugu | 26.04.2001 | 23 |
| 12 | DF | (Malaysia) | Muhammad Kama Edyka Azhar | 11.09.2001 | 23 |
| 13 | DF | (Malaysia) | Mohamad Akif Afizi Ramzi | 27.04.2003 | 21 |
| 14 | FW | (Malaysia) | Wan Syamil Sulaiman Wan Salman | 14.02.2003 | 21 |
| 16 | FW | (Malaysia) | Khairol Izham Mohd Aluwi | 16.06.2005 | 19 |
| 17 | DF | (Malaysia) | Muhammad Farhan Md Zaidi | 16.10.2003 | 21 |
| 18 | MF | (Malaysia) | Ariq Aiman Mohd Azril | 23.06.2002 | 22 |
| 19 | DF | (Malaysia) | Muhammad Izz Shahaimi | 08.06.2004 | 20 |
| 21 | DF | (Malaysia) | Muhammad Iman Hakimi Aznan | 15.02.2003 | 21 |
| 22 | GK | (Malaysia) | Muhammad Haziq Fitri Nek Lah | 29.11.2002 | 22 |
| 23 | DF | (Malaysia) | Hezri Sham Asnorhadi | 23.03.2003 | 21 |
| 25 | MF | (Malaysia) | Muhammad Fawwaz Muqrish Rosli | 08.02.2004 | 20 |
| 26 | MF | (Malaysia) | Muhamad Faris Akmal Azman | 29.05.2001 | 23 |
| 29 | GK | (Malaysia) | Muhammad Azeem Farhan Fazis Iskandar | 25.10.2002 | 22 |
| 30 | MF | (Malaysia) | Muhammad Za'im Hakim Zakaria | 08.11.2002 | 22 |

=== U-20 squad ===
Currently plays in the President Cup tournament for 2024–25.

As of 4 May 2024

| No | Pos | Nat | Names | D.O.B | Age |
|---|---|---|---|---|---|
| 1 | GK | (Malaysia) | Mohammad Danial Walizah | 26.09.2006 | 18 |
| 2 | DF | (Malaysia) | Mohammad Sharil Haizat Sahrin | 10.03.2005 | 19 |
| 3 | DF | (Malaysia) | Muhammad Denish Naufal Yuszailan | 06.12.2006 | 18 |
| 4 | DF | (Malaysia) | Muhammad Syafiq Nurul Hisham | 21.03.2004 | 20 |
| 5 | DF | (Malaysia) | Muhammad Fitri Adha Azman | 06.01.2005 | 19 |
| 6 | DF | (Malaysia) | Muhammad Haiqal Danish Khairul Nizam | 14.03.2004 | 20 |
| 7 | DF | (Malaysia) | Muhammad Noor Aidil Zailani | 04.02.2004 | 20 |
| 8 | MF | (Malaysia) | Muhammad Noor Adha Zailani | 04.02.2004 | 20 |
| 9 | FW | (Malaysia) | Muhammad Alif Irfan Norsafidahlan | 10.06.2004 | 20 |
| 10 | FW | (Malaysia) | Abdul Azam Hakim Mohd Zaki | 16.11.2005 | 19 |
| 11 | FW | (Malaysia) | Ammar Haikal Mohd Faizal | 08.06.2005 | 19 |
| 12 | MF | (Malaysia) | Aliff Danial Mohd Sarazin | 08.06.2005 | 19 |
| 13 | DF | (Malaysia) | Muhammad Farish Haykal Zahari | 27.07.2004 | 20 |
| 14 | DF | (Malaysia) | Karl Iskandar | 06.04.2005 | 19 |
| 15 | DF | (Malaysia) | Muhammad Afiff Imran Yusmadi | 12.04.2006 | 18 |
| 16 | MF | (Malaysia) | Kartikeyan T. M. Valluvan | 15.04.2005 | 19 |
| 17 | MF | (Malaysia) | Abdul Rafiq Abdul Rahim | 19.01.2004 | 20 |
| 18 | MF | (Malaysia) | Syed Jaafar Muzakir Syed Muhamad Ali | 11.05.2005 | 19 |
| 19 | FW | (Malaysia) | Muhammad Al Amin Azirol | 10.09.2006 | 18 |
| 20 | GK | (Malaysia) | Silmi Othman | 19.04.2004 | 20 |
| 21 | FW | (Malaysia) | Muhammad Zaim Iqbal Zulkarnain | 02.02.2004 | 20 |
| 22 | GK | (Malaysia) | Aidil Ameer Adzha Abd. Wahid | 09.01.2006 | 18 |
| 23 | FW | (Malaysia) | Harish Thigarajah | 03.03.2004 | 20 |
| 27 | DF | (Malaysia) | Mohamad Ashraf Iqwan Anuar | 20.02.2004 | 20 |

=== U-18 squad ===
Currently plays in the Youth Cup tournament for 2024–25.

As of 4 May 2024

| No | Pos | Nat | Names | D.O.B | Age |
|---|---|---|---|---|---|
| 28 | DF | (Malaysia) | Aiman Hakim Junaidi | 19.08.2006 | 18 |
| 29 | DF | (Malaysia) | Muhammad Fahrin Nazrin Khairi Anuar | 02.11.2006 | 18 |
| 30 | MF | (Malaysia) | Muhammad Asyraf Tuah | 13.11.2006 | 18 |
| 31 | GK | (Malaysia) | Hasbul Hadi Hanis Hamizar | 08.04.2006 | 18 |
| 32 | DF | (Malaysia) | Muhamad Adam Baqishah Rohaini | 03.05.2006 | 18 |
| 33 | DF | (Malaysia) | Arham Azuddin | 07.01.2006 | 18 |
| 34 | DF | (Malaysia) | Muhammad Aiman Shahrin | 03.01.2006 | 18 |
| 35 | DF | (Malaysia) | Muhammad Shahril Haikal Shahrin | 14.10.2006 | 18 |
| 36 | DF | (Malaysia) | Muhammad Hazim Mohammad Ajlan | 20.07.2007 | 17 |
| 37 | MF | (Malaysia) | Ahmad Danish Ahmad Razdi | 27.06.2006 | 18 |
| 38 | MF | (Malaysia) | Vishu Jegan | 11.01.2006 | 18 |
| 39 | FW | (Malaysia) | Muhammad Muizzuddin Nor Azri | 20.11.2006 | 18 |
| 40 | FW | (Malaysia) | Hani Amir Hakimi Abdul Ghani | 20.05.2006 | 18 |
| 41 | GK | (Malaysia) | Muhammad Fareez Safwan Mohamed Nasir | 10.03.2006 | 18 |
| 42 | GK | (Malaysia) | Muhammad Haikal Mohd Hanaffi | 24.08.2006 | 18 |
| 43 | DF | (Malaysia) | Muhammad Airil Fahmi Muhamad Azali | 07.04.2006 | 18 |
| 44 | DF | (Malaysia) | Syabil Hakim Mohd Sabry | 07.11.2006 | 18 |
| 45 | DF | (Malaysia) | Izzul Hilmi Roslan | 26.09.2006 | 18 |
| 46 | MF | (Malaysia) | Muhammad Farish Hafiy Muhammad Azli | 06.08.2007 | 17 |
| 47 | MF | (Malaysia) | Adam Harris Nazaruddin | 24.02.2006 | 18 |
| 48 | MF | (Malaysia) | Zydani Zidane Nafrizan | 24.06.2006 | 18 |
| 49 | FW | (Malaysia) | Farish Haiqal Rosman | 26.03.2007 | 17 |
| 50 | DF | (Malaysia) | Muhammad Irfan Syahmi Mohd Azmi | 02.02.2006 | 18 |
| 51 | MF | (Malaysia) | Muhammad Danish Kamarul Azaman | 24.02.2006 | 18 |
| 52 | MF | (Malaysia) | Ahmad Zahin Nashriq Ahmad Zaky | 22.02.2006 | 18 |
| 53 | MF | (Malaysia) | Muhammad Azri Hanif Noor | 19.11.2007 | 17 |
| 54 | FW | (Malaysia) | Muhammad Nabil Shahrul Naim | 16.01.2006 | 18 |
| 55 | MF | (Malaysia) | Muhammad Aiman Hazizi Abdullah | 07.05.2006 | 18 |
| 56 | MF | (Malaysia) | Aswan Adi | 03.12.2007 | 17 |
| 57 | MF | (Malaysia) | Muhammad Syahmi Hazim Shahrul Azman | 21.09.2006 | 18 |
