= Azri Ghani =

Malaysian footballer

Personal information
- Full name: Muhammad Azri bin Abdul Ghani
- Date of birth: 30 April 1999 (age 27)
- Place of birth: Kota Bharu, Malaysia
- Height: 1.77 m (5 ft 10 in)
- Position: Goalkeeper

Team information
- Current team: Negeri Sembilan
- Number: 30

Youth career
- 2017: Felda United

Senior career*
Years	Team	Apps	(Gls)
2018–2019	Felda United	1	(0)
2020	Kedah Darul Aman	3	(0)
2021	Perak	7	(0)
2022–2025	Kuala Lumpur City	29	(0)
2025–	Negeri Sembilan	24	(0)

International career^{‡}
2018	Malaysia U19	22	(0)
2019–2022	Malaysia U23	8	(0)
2024–	Malaysia	8	(0)
Medal record
Men's football
Representing Malaysia
FIFA ASEAN Cup
Third place	2026 Indonesia
Merdeka Tournament
Winner	2024
AFF U-19 Youth Championship
First place	2018 Indonesia
Second place	2017 Myanmar
- * Club domestic league appearances and goals as of 8 June 2026 ‡ National team caps and goals as of 6 October 2026

Muhammad Azri bin Abdul Ghani (born 30 April 1999) is a Malaysian professional footballer who plays as a goalkeeper for Malaysia Super League club Negeri Sembilan and the Malaysia national team.

== Club career ==
=== Felda United ===
Azri started his career at Felda United where he was promoted to the senior squad for the 2018 Malaysia Premier League season.

=== Kedah Darul Aman ===
In January 2020, Azri moved to Malaysia Super League club Kedah Darul Aman. On 26 August, he made his debut for the club coming on as a substitute in the 61st minute for the injured Shahril Sa'ari. He would then play in the next two consecutive league match for the club.

=== Perak ===
On 3 January 2021, Azri signed a contract for Perak. On 25 April 2021, he made his league debut for the club in a 0–1 defeat to Melaka United.

=== Kuala Lumpur City ===
On 14 January 2022, Azri signed for Kuala Lumpur City. On 13 March, he make his debut in the 2022 Malaysia Cup fixture playing the full match in a 8–0 thrashing win over Langkawi City. He would than make his league debut for the club on 17 March where he go on to make eight consecutive appearance before picking up an injury in training forcing him to missed a match against Sri Pahang on 4 June. Azri was than selected as the main goalkeeper in the 2022 AFC Cup group stage fixtures where he make his debut against Indonesian club PSM Makassar on 24 June.

=== Negeri Sembilan ===
On June 14, 2025, Azri was announced as a new signing for Negeri Sembilan ahead of the 2025–26 season. He left KL City after three seasons with the club. His experience competing at the highest level was seen as a valuable addition to strengthen Negeri Sembilan's last line of defence.

== International career ==
=== Youth ===
Azri has represented Malaysia at the under-19 level. He played at the 2018 AFC U-19 Championship, which Malaysia hosted.

In August 2021, Azri was called up to the under-20 team for central training.

=== Senior ===
With main choice goalkeeper Syihan Hazmi out with injury, Azri was chosen in the starting line up thus making his debut for the Malaysia national team on 6 June 2024 in a 2026 FIFA World Cup qualifier against Kyrgyzstan at the Dolen Omurzakov Stadium. He played the full game as it ended in a 1–1 draw. Azri also played in the next match against Chinese Taipei on 11 June 2024 which ended in a 3–1 victory.

== Career statistics ==
=== Club ===
As of match played 8 June 2026

Appearances and goals by club, season and competition
Club	Season	League			Cup (Note: Malaysia FA Cup)		League Cup (Note: Malaysia Cup)		Continental		Total	
Club	Season	Division	Apps	Goals	Apps	Goals	Apps	Goals	Apps	Goals	Apps	Goals
Felda United	2018	Malaysia Premier League	1	0	0	0	1	0	—		2	0
Felda United	2019	Malaysia Premier League	0	0	0	0	0	0	—		0	0
Felda United	Total		1	0	0	0	1	0	—		2	0
Kedah Darul Aman	2020	Malaysia Super League	3	0	–		1	0	—		4	0
Kedah Darul Aman	Total		3	0	0	0	1	0	—		4	0
Perak	2021	Malaysia Super League	7	0	–		0	0	—		7	0
Perak	Total		7	0	0	0	0	0	—		7	0
Kuala Lumpur City	2022	Malaysia Super League	0	0	1	0	1	0	4	0	6	0
Kuala Lumpur City	2023	Malaysia Super League	13	0	0	0	0	0	—		13	0
Kuala Lumpur City	2024–25	Malaysia Super League	16	0	1	0	3	0	3	0	23	0
Kuala Lumpur City	Total		29	0	2	0	4	0	7	0	42	0
Negeri Sembilan	2025–26	Malaysia Super League	24	0	4	0	2	0	—		30	0
Negeri Sembilan	2026–27	Malaysia Super League	0	0	0	0	0	0	—		0	0
Negeri Sembilan	Total		24	0	4	0	2	0	—		30	0
Career total			64	0	6	0	8	0	7	0	87	0

=== International ===
As of match played 6 October 2026

Appearances and goals by national team and year
National team	Year	Apps	Goals
Malaysia	2024	3	0
Malaysia	2025	3	0
Malaysia	2026	2	0
Total		8	0

== Honours ==
Kuala Lumpur City

- AFC Cup runner-up: 2022
- Malaysia FA Cup runner-up: 2023

Malaysia U19

- AFF U-19 Youth Championship: 2018; runner-up: 2017

Malaysia

- Merdeka Tournament: 2024
