= Aqil Razak =

Malaysian footballer

Personal information
- Full name: Muhamad Aqil bin Abdul Razak
- Date of birth: 28 April 1997 (age 29)
- Place of birth: Kuala Lumpur, Malaysia
- Height: 1.77 m (5 ft 10 in)
- Position: Goalkeeper

Team information
- Current team: Negeri Sembilan
- Number: 22

Youth career
- 2015–2016: Felda United
- 2017–2018: PKNS FC
- 2019: Petaling Jaya City

Senior career*
Years	Team	Apps	(Gls)
2020–2022	Petaling Jaya City	1	(0)
2023	PDRM	3	(0)
2024–	Negeri Sembilan	19	(0)
- * Club domestic league appearances and goals as of 8 June 2026 (UTC) ‡ National team caps and goals as of 21 June 2025

Muhamad Aqil bin Abdul Razak (born 28 April 1997) is a Malaysian professional footballer who plays as a goalkeeper for Malaysia Super League club Negeri Sembilan.

== Club career ==
=== Petaling Jaya City ===
Aqil was promoted to the senior squad of Petaling Jaya City ahead of the 2020 Malaysia Super League season. He made his sole league appearance for the club in 2022, featuring in a match against Sabah.

=== PDRM FC ===
On 10 December 2022, Aqil was officially announced as a new signing for PDRM FC ahead of the 2023 Malaysia Super League season. He became part of the club's goalkeeping rotation and made several appearances during the campaign.

=== Negeri Sembilan ===
On 15 March 2024, Aqil was officially announced as a new signing for Negeri Sembilan ahead of the 2024–25 Malaysia Super League season. He established himself as the club's first-choice goalkeeper during the campaign and is set to continue with the team into the 2025–26 season.

== Career statistics ==
=== Club ===
As of 8 June 2026

Club	Season	League			Cup		League Cup		Total	
Club	Season	Division	Apps	Goals	Apps	Goals	Apps	Goals	Apps	Goals
Petaling Jaya City	2022	Malaysia Super League	1	0	0	0	0	0	1	0
Petaling Jaya City	Total		1	0	0	0	0	0	1	0
PDRM	2023	Malaysia Super League	3	0	1	0	0	0	4	0
PDRM	Total		3	0	1	0	0	0	4	0
Negeri Sembilan	2024–25	Malaysia Super League	19	0	0	0	1	0	20	0
Negeri Sembilan	2025–26	Malaysia Super League	0	0	0	0	2	0	2	0
Negeri Sembilan	Total		19	0	0	0	3	0	22	0
Career total			23	0	1	0	3	0	27	0
