= Luis Enrique Nsue =

Equatoguinean footballer (born 1998)

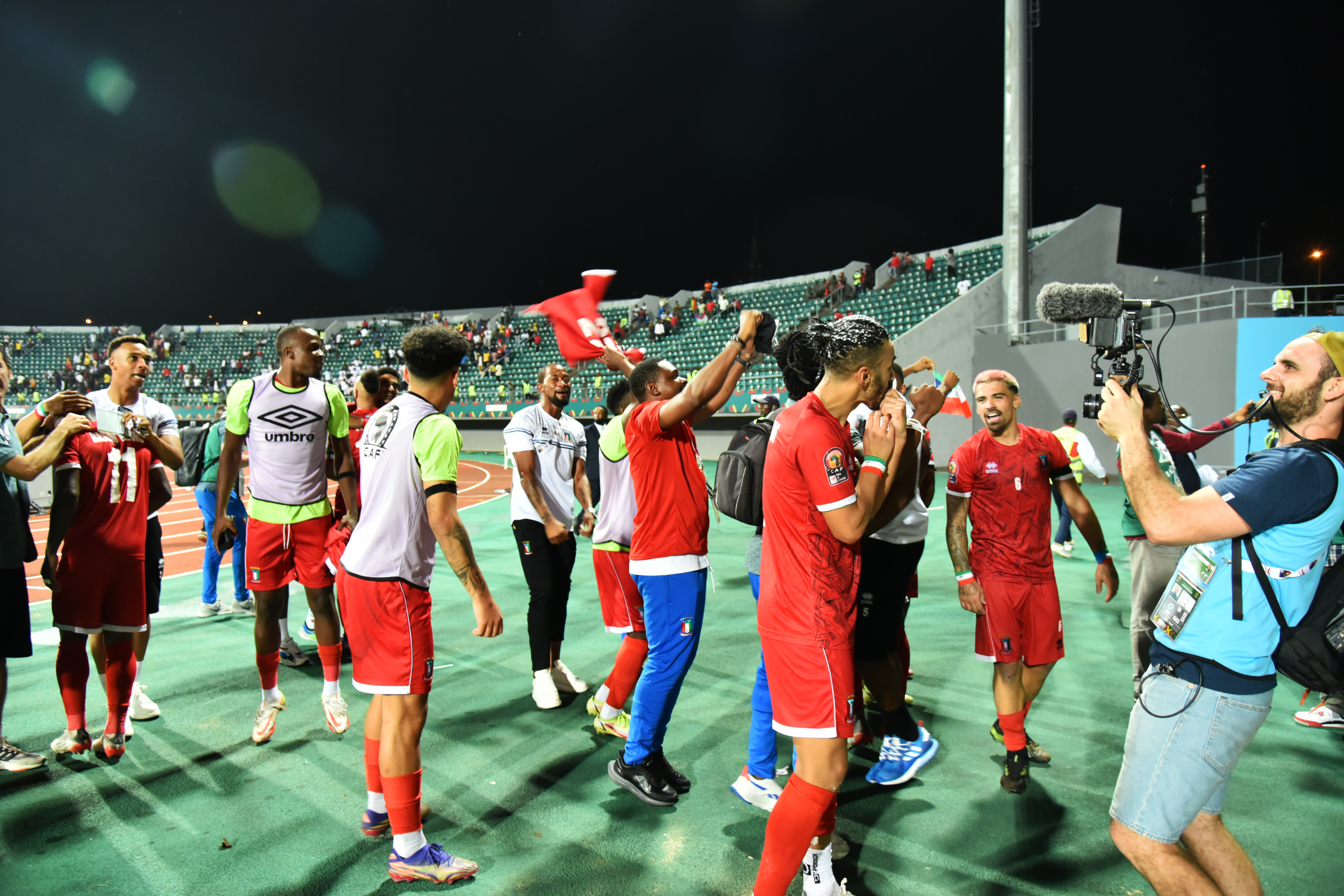
- Nsue with Equatorial Guinea in 2022

Personal information
- Full name: Luis Enrique Nsue Ntugu Akele
- Date of birth: 16 January 1998 (age 28)
- Place of birth: Ebibeyin, Equatorial Guinea
- Height: 1.87 m (6 ft 2 in)
- Position: Centre-back

Youth career
- 20??–201?: AD Mesi Nkulu
- 201?–201?: Cano Sport

Senior career*
Years	Team	Apps	(Gls)
201?–2017	Cano Sport		
2017–2018	Atlético Puertollano	21	(1)
2018–2019	Cano Sport		
2019–2020	Aravaca		
2020–2022	Cano Sport		
2022–2023	EO Sidi Bouzid	18	(0)
2023–2024	FC Bălți	8	(0)
2024–2025	COD Meknès	12	(0)
2025–2026	Negeri Sembilan	15	(1)

International career^{‡}
2018	Equatorial Guinea U23	1	(0)
2018–	Equatorial Guinea	10	(0)
- * Club domestic league appearances and goals as of 8 June 2026 ‡ National team caps and goals as of 26 March 2024.

Luis Enrique Nsue Ntugu Akele (born 16 January 1998) is an Equatoguinean professional footballer who plays as a centre-back for the Equatorial Guinea national team.

== Club career ==
Nsue is an AD Mesi Nkulu and Cano Sport Academy product. He also played for CDB FB Atlético Puertollano and Aravaca CF in Spain.

In July 2025, Nsue signed for Negeri Sembilan.

== International career ==
Nsue made his international debut for Equatorial Guinea on 28 May 2018. He also appeared in 2019 Africa U-23 Cup of Nations qualification matches.

== Career statistics ==
=== Club ===
As of 8 June 2026

Club	Season	League			Cup		League Cup		Total	
Club	Season	Division	Apps	Goals	Apps	Goals	Apps	Goals	Apps	Goals
Negeri Sembilan	2025–26	Malaysia Super League	15	1	2	0	4	0	21	1
Career total			15	1	2	0	4	0	21	1
