= Harith Samsuri =

Malaysian footballer

Personal information
- Full name: Muhammad Harith bin Samsuri
- Date of birth: 5 July 2000 (age 26)
- Place of birth: Johor Bahru, Johor, Malaysia
- Height: 1.82 m (6 ft 0 in)
- Positions: Left-back; centre-back

Team information
- Current team: Star City F.C.
- Number: 4

Youth career
- 2018–2020: Johor Darul Ta'zim
- 2021: Melaka

Senior career*
Years	Team	Apps	(Gls)
2022	Bukit Tambun	15	(2)
2023	Negeri Sembilan U-23		
2024–2026	Negeri Sembilan	35	(1)
- * Club domestic league appearances and goals as of July 2026 ‡ National team caps and goals as of 21 June 2025

Muhammad Harith bin Samsuri (born 5 July 2000) is a Malaysian professional footballer who plays as a left-back or centre-back.

== Club career ==
=== Negeri Sembilan ===
Harith Samsuri began his career with Negeri Sembilan's U23 team during the 2023 season. In 2024, he was promoted to the senior squad ahead of the Malaysia Super League campaign. He made his first-team debut on 26 May 2024 in a league match against Selangor FC. Harith scored his first senior goal on 26 February 2025 in a league fixture against Kedah Darul Aman.

Harith is set to remain with Negeri Sembilan for the 2025–26 season, continuing his development with the senior squad.

== International career ==
In November 2024, Harith received his first call‑up to the Malaysia senior national team by head coach Pau Martí for the AFF Mitsubishi Electric Cup preliminary squad. He was later forced to withdraw due to injury before the tournament began.

== Career statistics ==
=== Club ===
As of 8 June 2026

Club	Season	League			Cup		League Cup		Total	
Club	Season	Division	Apps	Goals	Apps	Goals	Apps	Goals	Apps	Goals
Bukit Tambun	2022	Malaysia M3 League	15	2	2	0	0	0	17	2
Negeri Sembilan	2024–25	Malaysia Super League	14	1	1	0	1	0	16	1
Negeri Sembilan	2025–26	Malaysia Super League	21	0	3	0	4	0	28	0
Negeri Sembilan	Total		35	1	4	0	5	0	44	1
Career total			50	3	6	0	5	0	61	3
