= Mio Tsuneyasu =

Japanese footballer

Mio Tsuneyasu 常安 澪
Personal information
- Full name: Mio Tsuneyasu
- Date of birth: 8 September 2001 (age 25)
- Place of birth: Tokyo, Japan
- Height: 1.65 m (5 ft 5 in)
- Positions: Winger; attacking midfielder

Team information
- Current team: Negeri Sembilan
- Number: 20

Youth career
- –2019: Frontale U18
- 2020–2023: Tokai Gakuen University

Senior career*
| Years | Team | Apps | (Gls) |
| 2023–2026 | Gainare Tottori | 21 | (0) |
| 2025–2026 | → Negeri Sembilan (loan) | 23 | (4) |
| 2026– | Negeri Sembilan | 0 | (0) |
- * Club domestic league appearances and goals as of 8 June 2026 (UTC)

Mio Tsuneyasu (常安 澪, Tsuneyasu Mio; born September 8, 2001) is a Japanese professional footballer who plays as a winger or attacking midfielder for Malaysia Super League club Negeri Sembilan.

== Club career ==
=== Gainare Tottori ===
On 7 September 2023, Tsuneyasu was officially announced as a new signing for Gainare Tottori. He made his J.League debut two days later, on 9 September 2023. Since joining the club, Tsuneyasu has made 25 appearances.

=== Negeri Sembilan (loan) ===
On 4 July 2025, Tsuneyasu was announced as a loan signing for Malaysia Super League club Negeri Sembilan for the 2025–26 season. The deal is from the start of the league until 31 December 2025. He came on as a sub in the match against Selangor on 24 August, scoring twice to win the game 2–1. In December, the club announced extension of his loan spell until the end of 2025–26 season.

== Career statistics ==
=== Club ===
As of 8 June 2026

| Club | Season | League | | | Cup (Note: Includes Emperor's Cup, Malaysia FA Cup) | | League Cup (Note: Includes J.League Cup, Malaysia Cup) | | Total | |
| Club | Season | Division | Apps | Goals | Apps | Goals | Apps | Goals | Apps | Goals |
|---|---|---|---|---|---|---|---|---|---|---|
| Gainare Tottori | 2023 | J3 League | 5 | 0 | 0 | 0 | 0 | 0 | 5 | 0 |
| Gainare Tottori | 2024 | J3 League | 14 | 0 | 1 | 0 | 1 | 0 | 16 | 0 |
| Gainare Tottori | 2025 | J3 League | 2 | 0 | 1 | 0 | 1 | 0 | 4 | 0 |
| Gainare Tottori | Total | | 21 | 0 | 2 | 0 | 2 | 0 | 25 | 0 |
| Negeri Sembilan (loan) | 2025–26 | Malaysia Super League | 23 | 4 | 4 | 2 | 1 | 0 | 28 | 6 |
| Negeri Sembilan (loan) | Total | | 23 | 4 | 4 | 2 | 1 | 0 | 28 | 6 |
| Negeri Sembilan | 2026–27 | Malaysia Super League | 0 | 0 | 0 | 0 | 0 | 0 | 0 | 0 |
| Negeri Sembilan | Total | | 0 | 0 | 0 | 0 | 0 | 0 | 0 | 0 |
| Career total | | | 44 | 4 | 6 | 2 | 3 | 0 | 53 | 6 |
