= Syahmi Adib Haikal =

Malaysian footballer (born 2003)

Personal information
- Full name: Syahmi Adib Haikal Bin Mohd Shukri
- Date of birth: 30 March 2003 (age 23)
- Place of birth: Johor, Malaysia
- Height: 1.80 m (5 ft 11 in)
- Position: Goalkeeper

Team information
- Current team: Negeri Sembilan
- Number: 21

Youth career
- –2020: Mokhtar Dahari Academy
- 2021–2022: Selangor II

Senior career*
Years	Team	Apps	(Gls)
2023–2025	Selangor	0	(0)
2024–2025	→ Negeri Sembilan (loan)	1	(0)
2025–	Negeri Sembilan	0	(0)

International career^{‡}
2020–2023	Malaysia U19	5	(0)
Medal record
Men's football
Representing Malaysia
ASEAN U-19 Boys' Championship
Winner	2022
- * Club domestic league appearances and goals as of 23 June 2025 ‡ National team caps and goals as of 21:00, 12 August 2024

Syahmi Adib Haikal Bin Mohd Shukri (born 30 March 2003) is a Malaysian professional footballer who plays as a goalkeeper for Malaysia Super League club Negeri Sembilan.

== Club career ==
=== Selangor ===
Syahmi was at the youth team of Mokhtar Dahari Academy (AMD) for several years. At the age of 17, He moved to the Selangor academy in 2020. He signed his first professional contract with Selangor in 2023. Throughout the 2022 and 2023 season, he became the first-choice goalkeeper in the under-23 squad, and was third-choice for the senior squad and appeared in the substitute bench for several matches.

=== Negeri Sembilan ===
On 9 March 2024, Syahmi was signed by Negeri Sembilan on a season-long loan deal. On 15 June 2024, he made his professional debut for Negeri Sembilan in FA Cup match in a 4–0 away defeat against his parent club, Selangor. He made his move to Negeri Sembilan permanent on 23 June 2025.

== International career ==
=== Youth ===
Syahmi has represented Malaysia at various age levels, including at under-19 and under-23 levels. He represented the squad under-19 at the 2022 AFF U-19 Youth Championship, which helped them win the tournament. He also included in Malaysia's 26-man squad under-19 for the 2023 AFC U-20 Asian Cup qualification. In middle-August 2023, Syahmi was called up by the Malaysia under-23 team for the 2023 AFF U-23 Championship tournament.

== Career statistics ==
=== Club ===
As of match played 20 April 2025

Appearances and goals by club, season and competition
Club	Season	League			Cup (Note: Appearances in Malaysia FA Cup)		League Cup (Note: Appearances in Malaysia Cup)		Continental (Note: Appearances in AFC Champions League and AFC Champions League Two)		Total	
Club	Season	Division	Apps	Goals	Apps	Goals	Apps	Goals	Apps	Goals	Apps	Goals
Selangor	2022	Malaysia Super League	0	0	0	0	0	0	—		0	0
Selangor	2023	Malaysia Super League	0	0	0	0	0	0	—		0	0
Selangor	Total		0	0	0	0	0	0	0	0	0	0
Negeri Sembilan (loan)	2024–25	Malaysia Super League	1	0	1	0	1	0	—		3	0
Negeri Sembilan (loan)	Total		1	0	1	0	1	0	0	0	3	0
Negeri Sembilan	2025–26	Malaysia Super League	0	0	0	0	0	0	—		0	0
Negeri Sembilan	2026–27	Malaysia Super League	0	0	0	0	0	0			0	0
Negeri Sembilan	Total		0	0	0	0	0	0	0	0	0	0
Career total			1	0	1	0	1	0	0	0	3	0

== Honours ==
Malaysia U19

- AFF U-19 Youth Championship : 2022
