= Jovan Motika =

Bosnian footballer (born 1998)

Personal information
- Full name: Jovan Motika
- Date of birth: 11 September 1998 (age 28)
- Place of birth: Rogatica, Republika Srpska, Bosnia and Herzegovina
- Height: 1.75 m (5 ft 9 in)
- Position: Winger

Team information
- Current team: Negeri Sembilan
- Number: 9

Youth career
- –2016: Radnik Bijeljina

Senior career*
Years	Team	Apps	(Gls)
2016–2022	Radnik Bijeljina	75	(2)
2022–2024	Bjelovar	15	(19)
2024–2025	Kuala Lumpur City	23	(4)
2025–	Negeri Sembilan	18	(8)

International career^{‡}
2019	Bosnia and Herzegovina U21	1	(0)
- * Club domestic league appearances and goals as of 8 June 2026 (UTC) ‡ National team caps and goals as of 21 June 2025

Jovan Motika (Bosnian pronunciation: [jǒʋan mǒtika]; born 11 September 1998) is a Bosnian professional footballer who plays as a winger for Malaysia Super League club Negeri Sembilan.

== Club career ==
=== Radnik Bijeljina ===
Motika began his professional career with Radnik Bijeljina where he scored 10 goals in 47 appearances for the youth team. He was then promoted to the senior team at 17-years old. Motika made his senior debut on 6 July 2016 in a league match against Borac Banja Luka.

=== Kuala Lumpur City ===
On 28 April 2024, Motika moved to Southeast Asia to signed with Malaysia Super League club Kuala Lumpur City, joining on a free transfer from Bjelovar. His move was officially announced on the club's Instagram account on 28 April 2024. Motika arrived in Malaysia shortly in preparations for the 2024–25 Malaysia Super League season. He joined fellow Balkan imports Lazar Sajčić and Adrijan Rudović as part of club's six-man foreign contingent for the campaign. He make his debut on 12 May in a 1–1 draw to Kuching City. Motika then scored his first goal for the club scoring the only goal in the match against Selangor on 14 July.

=== Negeri Sembilan ===
On 4 July 2025, Motika was announced as a new signing for Malaysian club Negeri Sembilan ahead of the 2025–26 season. He scored a brace on his debut on 12 August which entirely shocks entire Malaysian citizens and also Southeast Asian region where Motika scored two goals in 13 minutes against giants Johor Darul Ta'zim at the Sultan Ibrahim Stadium, however, Negeri Sembilan lost 5–3 to the reigning champions.

== International career ==
In June 2019, Motika received his first call-up to the Bosnia and Herzegovina U21 squad. He made his debut on 5 June 2019 in an international friendly, coming on as a substitute for 21 minutes against Malta U21. This remains his sole appearance for the U21 national team.

== Career statistics ==
=== Club ===
As of 8 June 2026

Club	Season	League			Cup		League Cup		Continental		Total	
Club	Season	Division	Apps	Goals	Apps	Goals	Apps	Goals	Apps	Goals	Apps	Goals
Radnik Bijeljina	2015–16	Premier League BiH	2	0	1	0	—		—		3	0
Radnik Bijeljina	2016–17	Premier League BiH	5	0	0	0	—		—		5	0
Radnik Bijeljina	2017–18	Premier League BiH	0	0	0	0	—		—		0	0
Radnik Bijeljina	2018–19	Premier League BiH	10	0	1	1	—		—		11	1
Radnik Bijeljina	2019–20	Premier League BiH	13	1	1	0	—		2 (Note: 2019–20 UEFA Europa League qualifying)	0	16	1
Radnik Bijeljina	2020–21	Premier League BiH	23	0	2	2	—		—		25	2
Radnik Bijeljina	2021–22	Premier League BiH	22	1	2	0	—		—		24	1
Radnik Bijeljina	Total		75	2	7	3	—		2	0	84	5
Bjelovar	2022–23	Druga NL	9	9	0	0	—		—		9	9
Bjelovar	2023–24	Druga NL	6	10	2	0	—		—		8	10
Bjelovar	Total		15	19	2	0	—		—		17	19
Kuala Lumpur City	2024–25	Malaysia Super League	23	4	3	2	1	0	4	1	31	7
Kuala Lumpur City	Total		23	4	3	2	1	0	4	1	31	7
Negeri Sembilan	2025–26	Malaysia Super League	18	8	4	2	3	1	—		25	11
Negeri Sembilan	2026–27	Malaysia Super League	0	0	0	0	0	0	—		0	0
Negeri Sembilan	Total		18	8	4	2	3	1	—		25	11
Total career			131	33	16	7	4	1	6	1	157	42
