= Oday Kharoub =

Palestinian footballer

Personal information
- Full name: Oday Ali Abdulrahim Kharoub
- Date of birth: 5 February 1993 (age 33)
- Place of birth: Habla, Palestine
- Height: 1.77 m (5 ft 10 in)
- Position: Midfielder

Team information
- Current team: Al-Baqa'a

Senior career*
Years	Team	Apps	(Gls)
2012–2014	Thaqafi Tulkarm		
2014	Silwan		
2014–2016	Thaqafi Tulkarm		
2016–2017	Shabab Al-Khalil		
2017–2018	Thaqafi Tulkarm		
2018–2020	Markaz Balata		
2020–2023	Shabab Al-Khalil		
2023–2024	Hilal Al-Quds		
2024	Kelantan Darul Naim	12	(4)
2025	Al Ahly Benghazi	2	(0)
2026	Negeri Sembilan	9	(1)
2026–	Al-Baqa'a	0	(0)

International career^{‡}
	Palestine U23		(1)
2017–	Palestine	40	(1)
- * Club domestic league appearances and goals as of 8 June 2026 ‡ National team caps and goals as of 03:13, 11 June 2025 (UTC)

Oday Kharoub (Arabic: عدي خروب; born 5 February 1993) is a Palestinian footballer who plays as a midfielder for Al-Baqa'a and the Palestine national team.

== Club career ==
=== Hilal Al-Quds ===
On 29 May 2023, he signed for Hilal Al-Quds.

=== Negeri Sembilan ===
On 4 January 2026, Negeri Sembilan announced Oday Kharoub as a new signing to strengthen the squad for the remainder of the 2025–26 season.

== International career ==
He played for the Palestinian U-23 national team in the 2014 Palestine International Championship (Al-Nakba) and scored a goal in a 3–0 victory over Pakistan.

In January 2024, alongside his brother Baraa, he was named in Palestine 26-men squad for the 2023 AFC Asian Cup.

== Personal life ==
His brothers, Layth and Baraa are also footballers.

== Career statistics ==
=== Club ===
As of 8 June 2026

Club	Season	League			Cup		League Cup		Total	
Club	Season	Division	Apps	Goals	Apps	Goals	Apps	Goals	Apps	Goals
Negeri Sembilan	2025–26	Malaysia Super League	9	1	0	0	3	0	12	0
Career total			9	1	0	0	3	0	12	0

=== International ===
As of match played 10 June 2025

Appearances and goals by national team and year
National team	Year	Apps	Goals
Palestine	2017	1	0
Palestine	2018	3	0
Palestine	2020	3	0
Palestine	2021	9	0
Palestine	2022	2	0
Palestine	2023	6	0
Palestine	2024	13	0
Palestine	2025	3	1
Total		40	1

Scores and results list Palestine's goal tally first, score column indicates score after each Kharoub goal.

List of international goals scored by Oday Kharoub
No.	Date	Venue	Cap	Opponent	Score	Result	Competition
1	10 June 2025	King Abdullah II Stadium, Amman, Jordan	40	Oman	1–0	1–1	2026 FIFA World Cup qualification
