= Joseph Esso =

Ghanaian professional footballer

Personal information
- Full name: Joseph Esso
- Date of birth: 10 December 1996 (age 29)
- Place of birth: Accra, Ghana
- Height: 1.72 m (5 ft 8 in)
- Position: Forward

Team information
- Current team: Negeri Sembilan
- Number: 11

Senior career*
Years	Team	Apps	(Gls)
2016–2018	Ebusua Dwarfs	41	(9)
2018–2020	Hearts of Oak	42	(11)
2020–2021	Dreams Dawu	18	(12)
2021–2023	MC Alger	65	(11)
2024–2025	Dreams Dawu	42	(13)
2025–	Negeri Sembilan	22	(10)

International career
2017	Ghana A'	1	(2)
- * Club domestic league appearances and goals as of 8 June 2026

Joseph Esso (born 10 December 1996) is a Ghanaian footballer who plays as a forward for Malaysia Super League club Negeri Sembilan.

== Club career ==
=== Ebusua Dwarfs ===
Esso played for Ebusua Dwarfs from 2016 to 2018 before signing for Accra Hearts of Oak in 2018. He made 25 appearances and scored 9 goals in the 2017 Ghanaian Premier League season to help the club finish fourth.

=== Accra Hearts of Oak ===
On 19 February 2018, after his contract expired, Esso joined Accra Hearts of Oak on a free transfer signing a 3-year contract with the club. He played for Hearts for three seasons making 42 league appearances and scoring 11 goals.

=== Dreams Dawu ===
In 2020, Esso refused to extend his contract with Hearts after it expired. He was linked with a move to Sudanese club Al-Hilal. On 21 August 2020, he signed a two-year deal with Dreams Dawu.

=== MC Alger ===
On 18 April 2021, Esso moved to Algerian Ligue Professionnelle 1 club MC Alger. He make his debut on 4 May in a 2–1 win over USM Bel Abbès. He scored his first goal for the club and also providing an assist in a 3–2 win over ES Sétif on 28 June. On the last matchday of the season, Esso captained the club where he went on to scored his first career hat-trick in a 4–4 draw against NA Hussein Dey on 24 August.

=== Negeri Sembilan ===
On 16 July 2025, Esso moved to Malaysia to sign with Malaysia Super League club Negeri Sembilan. He scored on his debut in a 5–3 lost to Johor Darul Ta'zim on 12 August.

== International career ==
Esso featured for Ghana A' national team, the Local Black Stars at the 2019 WAFU Cup of Nations scoring two goals to help Ghana place runner-up in the competition. He was named in the competition's team of the tournament and recognized as one top performers during the competition.

== Personal life ==
Esso is the younger brother of fellow professional footballer Eric Esso who is currently playing for Philippines Football League club Kaya–Iloilo as of 2025.

== Career statistics ==
=== Club ===
As of 8 June 2026

Club	Season	League			Cup		League Cup		Continental		Total	
Club	Season	Division	Apps	Goals	Apps	Goals	Apps	Goals	Apps	Goals	Apps	Goals
Negeri Sembilan	2025–26	Malaysia Super League	22	10	4	2	4	0	—		30	12
Total career			22	10	4	2	4	0	0	0	30	12
