= Mika (footballer, born 1993) =

Spanish footballer

Personal information
- Full name: Miguel Ángel Junco Martínez
- Date of birth: 18 March 1993 (age 33)
- Place of birth: Santander, Spain
- Height: 1.75 m (5 ft 9 in)
- Position: Forward

Team information
- Current team: Jenis
- Number: 29

Youth career
- Peña Paco Lianco
- Bansander
- Racing Santander

Senior career*
Years	Team	Apps	(Gls)
2012	Racing B		
2013–2015	Luzern II	25	(11)
2015	Escobedo	16	(4)
2015–2016	Almudévar	37	(19)
2016	Huesca	1	(0)
2016–2017	Sariñena	34	(15)
2017–2018	Tudelano	26	(1)
2018–2019	Gimnástica Segoviana	38	(27)
2019	Marino Luanco	13	(3)
2020	Xerez Deportivo	8	(2)
2020	KTP	16	(11)
2021	Preah Khan Reach Svay Rieng	16	(15)
2022–2023	KTP	39	(21)
2024	Negeri Sembilan	8	(1)
2025–	Jenis	4	(1)
- * Club domestic league appearances and goals as of 12 July 2025

Miguel Ángel Junco Martínez (born 18 March 1993), commonly known as Mika, is a Spanish footballer who plays as a forward for Verdes FC in Premier League of Belize.

== Club career ==
Born in Santander, Cantabria, Mika was a Racing de Santander youth graduate. Shortly after making his debuts as a senior with the reserves in Tercera División, he left the club and went on a trial at FC Luzern in Switzerland.He also played Team TCSE in efootball terms and successful.

On 22 February 2013, after scoring a hat-trick in a friendly, Mika signed a two-and-a-half-year contract with the Swiss club. However, he would only appear with the reserves in 1. Liga Classic, and left the club in January 2015 after joining UM Escobedo.

On 5 August 2015, Mika joined SD Huesca and was immediately assigned to the farm team also in the fourth tier. On 4 June 2016, after scoring 19 goals for the B-side, he made his professional debut by coming on as a late substitute for Héctor Figueroa in a 1–0 Segunda División home win against CD Lugo.

On 7 September 2016, Mika signed for CD Sariñena also in the fourth tier.

On 25 March 2022, Mika returned to KTP in Finland for the 2022 season.

In 2026, Mika joined Verdes FC of the Premier League of Belize.

== Honours ==
KTP

- Ykkönen: 2022
- Ykkönen runner-up: 2020

Individual

- Ykkönen Player of the Month: September 2022

== Career statistics ==
As of 10 October 2024.

Appearances and goals by club, season and competition
Club	Season	League			Cup (Note: Includes Copa del Rey, Suomen Cup, Malaysia FA Cup)		Europe		Total	
Club	Season	Division	Apps	Goals	Apps	Goals	Apps	Goals	Apps	Goals
Luzern II	2012–13	Swiss 1. Liga	2	1	–		–		2	1
Luzern II	2013–14	Swiss 1. Liga	17	6	–		–		17	6
Luzern II	2014–15	Swiss 1. Liga	6	4	–		–		6	4
Luzern II	Total		25	11	0	0	0	0	25	11
Escobedo	2014–15	Tercera División	16	4	–		–		16	4
Almudévar	2015–16	Tercera División	37	19	–		–		37	19
Huesca	2015–16	LaLiga 2	1	0	–		–		1	0
Sariñena	2016–17	Tercera División	34	15	–		–		34	15
Tudelano	2017–18	Segunda División B	26	1	–		–		26	1
Gimnástica Segoviana	2018–19	Tercera División	38	27	–		–		38	27
Marino Luanco	2019–20	Segunda División B	13	3	1	1	–		14	4
Xerez Deportivo	2019–20	Tercera División	8	2	–		–		8	2
KTP	2020	Ykkönen	18	11	–		–		18	11
Preah Khan Reach Svay Rieng	2021	Cambodian Premier League	16	15	–		–		16	15
KTP	2022	Ykkönen	17	15	3	4	–		20	19
KTP	2023	Veikkausliiga	22	6	1	0	–		23	6
KTP	Total		39	21	4	4	0	0	43	25
Negeri Sembilan	2024–25	Malaysia Super League	8	1	1	0	–		9	1
Jenis	2025	Kazakhstan Premier League	0	0	0	0	–		0	0
Career total			279	130	6	5	0	0	285	135
