= Filip Chinzorig =

Mongolian footballer (born 2003)

Personal information
- Full name: Filip Solongo Hofman Andersen; Filip Andersen Chinzorig
- Date of birth: 13 February 2003 (age 23)
- Place of birth: Karlslunde, Denmark
- Height: 1.84 m (6 ft 0 in)
- Position: Centre-back

Team information
- Current team: Negeri Sembilan
- Number: 23

Youth career
- –2015: Karlslunde
- 2015–2022: Brøndby

Senior career*
Years	Team	Apps	(Gls)
2022–2023	Roskilde	5	(0)
2023–2024	Slavia Karlovy Vary	11	(0)
2024	Ulaanbaatar	16	(1)
2024–2025	Loyola	14	(1)
2025–	Negeri Sembilan	6	(0)

International career^{‡}
2018–2019	Denmark U16	6	(0)
2021	Denmark U19	3	(0)
2023–	Mongolia U23	3	(1)
2023–	Mongolia	9	(0)
- * Club domestic league appearances and goals as of 8 June 2026 (UTC) ‡ National team caps and goals as of 13:32, 31 August 2025 (UTC)

Filip Solongo Hofman Andersen (born 13 February 2003), known as Filip Chinzorig, is a professional footballer who plays as a centre-back for Malaysia Super League club Negeri Sembilan. Born in Denmark, he plays for the Mongolia national team.

== Club career ==
=== Early career ===
Chinzorig began his career with hometown club Karlslunde IF. In 2015, he joined the academy of Superliga club Brøndby IF. He worked his way up through the ranks, eventually to the under-19 side. In 2017 he participated with the club in an under-15 tournament hosted by the Aspire Academy in Qatar. Brøndby went undefeated to top its group which included the academy of Paris Saint-Germain.

By 2021 he had become a regular starter for the club's U19 team. That season he made twenty nine appearances for the club in the under-19 league. The following season, he made a further twenty four appearances. Despite his development, it was announced in summer 2022 that Chinzorig would not be re-signed. His final appearance came on 28 May 2022 as the U19 season concluded with a victory over Silkeborg IF. Chinzorig never made a first-team debut, but stated he hoped to return to the club in the future.

=== FC Roskilde ===
At the conclusion of his contract on 30 June 2022, Chinzorig left Brøndby after eight years and joined FC Roskilde of the Danish 2nd Division in search of more playing time. That season he made an appearance in a 2022–23 Danish Cup match against Fremad Amager. He played the full ninety minutes of the eventual 1–2 defeat. He made a further five appearances in the league.

=== Karlovy Vary ===
After a year at Roskilde, Chinzorig moved abroad to FC Slavia Karlovy Vary of the Bohemian Football League, the third tier of football in the Czech Republic, in summer 2023. He made his debut on the opening match of the season with the match ending in a 0–1 defeat to Dukla Prague B. He would go on to play every minute of the club's first five matches, including a 2023–24 Czech Cup match against FC Viktoria Mariánské Lázně.

=== Ulaanbaatar ===
During the winter 2024 transfer window, Chinzorig signed for Mongolian Premier League club FC Ulaanbaatar for the remainder of the 2023–24 season. He went on to appear in all sixteen of the club's matches, scoring one goal and tallying one assist.

=== Loyola ===
In September 2024, it was announced that he would be joining Loyola FC of the Philippines Football League on an initial one-year deal for the 2024–25 season.

=== Negeri Sembilan ===
On 30 August 2025, Chinzorig was announced as the latest signing for Malaysia Super League club Negeri Sembilan, thus becoming the first Mongolian footballer to play in Malaysia.

== International career ==
Chinzorig is eligible to represent both Denmark and Mongolia through his parents. He made six appearances for the Denmark's under-16 national team in various tournaments from 2018 to 2019. In 2021 he was called to the under-19 national team for the first time. He would make three appearances for the team, including two in 2022 UEFA European Under-19 Championship qualification. Later that year he was called up to the squad again for a tournament in Portugal which would include matches against Georgia and the hosts.

In 2023, Chinzorig accepted a call-up to the Mongolia national U23 team for 2024 AFC U-23 Asian Cup qualification. Against Lebanon in the team's final match, he scored from a header to give Mongolia the lead. The match ended in a 1–1 draw while Mongolia failed to advance to the final tournament. Later that year he was named to Mongolia's senior squad for two 2026 FIFA World Cup qualification matches against Afghanistan in October. He made his debut on 12 October 2023 as a starter in the first leg, an eventual 0–1 defeat.

== Career statistics ==
=== Club ===
As of 8 June 2026

Club	Season	League			Cup		League Cup		Total	
Club	Season	Division	Apps	Goals	Apps	Goals	Apps	Goals	Apps	Goals
Negeri Sembilan	2025–26	Malaysia Super League	6	0	2	0	0	0	8	0
Career total			6	0	2	0	0	0	8	0

=== International ===
As of match played 10 September 2024

Mongolia
Year	Apps	Goals
2023	2	0
2024	7	0
Total	9	0
