= Takumi Sasaki =

Japanese footballer

Takumi Sasaki 佐々木 匠
Personal information
- Full name: Takumi Sasaki
- Date of birth: March 30, 1998 (age 28)
- Place of birth: Sendai, Miyagi, Japan
- Height: 1.68 m (5 ft 6 in)
- Position: Midfielder

Team information
- Current team: Negeri Sembilan FC
- Number: 7

Youth career
- 2013–2015: Vegalta Sendai

Senior career*
Years	Team	Apps	(Gls)
2016–2022	Vegalta Sendai	23	(0)
2017	→ Tokushima Vortis (loan)	2	(0)
2018	→ Kamatamare Sanuki (loan)	40	(4)
2019	→ Renofa Yamaguchi (loan)	22	(3)
2022–2023	Ehime	50	(6)
2024–	Negeri Sembilan	47	(5)

International career
2013	Japan U-16	3	(1)
2015	Japan U-18	16	(0)
2017	Japan U-19	2	(0)
- * Club domestic league appearances and goals as of 8 June 2026

Takumi Sasaki (佐々木 匠, Sasaki Takumi; born March 30, 1998) is a Japanese professional footballer who plays as a midfielder for Malaysia Super League club Negeri Sembilan.

== Club career ==
=== Vegalta Sendai ===
In 2016, Sasaki joined J1 League club Vegalta Sendai in 2016. In February 2018, he was promoted to the senior squad.

=== Ehime ===
On 9 January 2022, Sasaki moved to J3 League club Ehime. He helped the club to gain promotion by winning the 2023 J3 League title.

=== Negeri Sembilan ===
On 11 March 2024, Sasaki moved to Malaysia Super League club Negeri Sembilan. For the 2025–26 season, Sasaki remains with Negeri Sembilan for a second consecutive year, with his contract running until 30 April 2026.

== Club statistics ==
As of 8 June 2026

Club performance			League		Cup		League Cup		Total	
Club	Season	League	Apps	Goals	Apps	Goals	Apps	Goals	Apps	Goals
Japan			League		Emperor's Cup		J. League Cup		Total	
Vegalta Sendai	2016	J1 League	2	0	0	0	0	0	2	0
Vegalta Sendai	2017	J1 League	5	0	1	0	7	3	13	3
Vegalta Sendai	2020	J1 League	12	0	0	0	2	0	14	0
Vegalta Sendai	2021	J1 League	4	0	1	0	5	2	10	2
Vegalta Sendai	Total		23	0	2	0	14	5	39	5
Tokushima Vortis (loan)	2017	J2 League	2	0	—		—		2	0
Tokushima Vortis (loan)	Total		2	0	—		—		2	0
Kamatamare Sanuki (loan)	2018	J2 League	40	4	0	0	0	0	40	4
Kamatamare Sanuki (loan)	Total		40	4	0	0	0	0	40	4
Renofa Yamaguchi (loan)	2019	J2 League	22	3	2	0	0	0	24	3
Renofa Yamaguchi (loan)	Total		22	3	2	0	0	0	24	3
Ehime	2022	J3 League	28	4	0	0	0	0	28	4
Ehime	2023	J3 League	22	2	0	0	0	0	22	2
Ehime	Total		50	6	0	0	0	0	50	6
Malaysia			League		Malaysia FA Cup		Malaysia Cup		Total	
Negeri Sembilan	2024–25	Malaysia Super League	23	2	0	0	4	0	27	2
Negeri Sembilan	2025–26	Malaysia Super League	24	3	4	0	4	0	32	3
Negeri Sembilan	Total		47	5	4	0	8	0	59	5
Career total			184	18	8	0	22	5	214	23

== Honours ==
=== Club ===
==== Ehime ====
- J3 League: 2023
