= Anuar Ceesay =

Malaysian footballer

Personal information
- Date of birth: 22 October 2002 (age 24)
- Place of birth: Cardiff, Wales
- Height: 1.71 m (5 ft 7 in)
- Position: Winger

Team information
- Current team: Negeri Sembilan
- Number: 29

Youth career
- –2021: Tooting & Mitcham United

Senior career*
Years	Team	Apps	(Gls)
2021–2023	Tooting & Mitcham United	39	(3)
2023–2024	Uxbridge	0	(0)
2023–2024	Badshot Lea	29	(2)
2024–2025	Leatherhead	33	(2)
2025	UM-Damansara United	13	(0)
2026–	Negeri Sembilan	5	(0)
- * Club domestic league appearances and goals as of 8 June 2026

Anuar Ceesay (born 22 October 2002) is a Welsh professional footballer who plays as a winger for Malaysia Super League club Negeri Sembilan.

== Career ==
Having come through their academy, Ceesay signed a contract with Tooting & Mitcham United in October 2021. He went on to make 45 appearances for the club in all competitions. Ceesay joined Uxbridge in August 2023, making one appearance for the club in the FA Cup where he scored in a 3–2 victory. The following month, Ceesay signed for Badshot Lea. He went on to make 36 appearances in all competitions for the club that season. On 30 May 2024, Ceesay signed for Leatherhead. He made 41 appearances for the club in all competitions before departing.

=== UM-Damansara ===
On 30 July 2025, Ceesay officially signed with A1 Semi-Pro League club UM-Damansara, strengthening the squad ahead of the upcoming season.

=== Negeri Sembilan ===
Ceesay left UM-Damansara after the club announced on 1 January that he had joined Negeri Sembilan in a transfer for an undisclosed fee.

== Career statistics ==
=== Club ===
As of 8 June 2026

Club	Season	League			Cup		League Cup		Total	
Club	Season	Division	Apps	Goals	Apps	Goals	Apps	Goals	Apps	Goals
UM-Damansara	2025–26	A1 Semi-Pro League	13	0	2	2	0	0	15	2
Negeri Sembilan	2025–26	Malaysia Super League	5	0	0	0	1	0	6	0
Career total			18	0	2	2	1	0	21	2
