= Ikhwan Yazek =

Malaysian professional footballer

Personal information
- Full name: Mohamad Ikhwan bin Yazek
- Date of birth: 25 August 2000 (age 26)
- Place of birth: Pasir Mas, Kelantan, Malaysia
- Height: 1.62 m (5 ft 4 in)
- Position: Winger

Team information
- Current team: Negeri Sembilan
- Number: 13

Youth career
- Malaysia Pahang Sports School
- 2020: Kelantan United U21
- 2021: Negeri Sembilan U21

Senior career*
Years	Team	Apps	(Gls)
2022–2023	Kelantan	17	(2)
2024–	Negeri Sembilan	20	(0)
- * Club domestic league appearances and goals as of 12 May 2025

Mohamad Ikhwan bin Yazek (born 25 August 2000) is a Malaysian professional footballer who plays for Malaysia Super League club Negeri Sembilan as a winger.

== Early life ==
Ikhwan was born in Lati Pasir Mas hospital and played for Pahang Malaysia Sports School and the Negeri Sembilan FC under 21 team.

== Career ==
Before the 2022 season, Ikhwan signed for Kelantan. During a 2–1 win over PDRM, he scored a goal some observers regarded as worthy of FIFA Puskás Award nomination. Before the 2023 season, he established himself as one of Kelantan's most promising young players.

== Style of play ==
Ikhwan mainly operates as a winger.

== Personal life ==
Ikhwan has four siblings.

== Career statistics ==
=== Club ===
As of match played 25 February 2023

Appearances and goals by club, season and competition
Club	Season	League			Cup		League Cup		Continental		Total	
Club	Season	Division	Apps	Goals	Apps	Goals	Apps	Goals	Apps	Goals	Apps	Goals
Kelantan	2022	Malaysia Premier League	12	2	0	0	3	0	–		15	2
Kelantan	2023	Malaysia Super League	5	0	0	0	0	0	–		5	0
Kelantan	Total		17	2	0	0	3	0	–		20	2
Negeri Sembilan	2024–25	Malaysia Super League	20	0	3	0	1	0	–		24	0
Negeri Sembilan	Total		20	0	3	0	1	0	–		24	0
Career Total			0	0	0	0	0	0	–	–	0	0
