= Norhafiz Zamani =

Malaysian footballer (born 1981)

Norhafiz Zamani Misbah
- Norhafiz Zamani Misbah

Personal information
- Full name: Norhafiz Zamani Bin Misbah
- Date of birth: 15 July 1981 (age 45)
- Place of birth: Malacca, Malaysia
- Height: 1.73 m (5 ft 8 in)
- Position: Centre-back

Team information
- Current team: Mokhtar Dahari Academy (assistant coach)

Youth career
- 1995–1998: Negeri Sembilan
- 1999: Malaysia U-19

Senior career*
Years	Team	Apps	(Gls)
2000–2004	Negeri Sembilan		
2005–2008	Pahang		
2009–2010	KL PLUS FC		
2011–2014	Negeri Sembilan		
2015–2017	Kelantan	46	(0)
2018	Penang	19	(0)
2019–2020	Negeri Sembilan	11	(0)

International career^{‡}
2001–2012	Malaysia	66	(2)

Managerial career
- 2021–: Mokhtar Dahari Academy (assistant coach)
Medal record
Malaysia under-23
Sea Games
Silver medal – second place	Sea Games 2001	Football
Merdeka Tournament
Winner	2007
Malaysia
AFF Championship
Bronze medal – third place	2004
- * Club domestic league appearances and goals as of 15 August 2014 ‡ National team caps and goals as of 15 August 2014

Norhafiz Zamani bin Misbah (born 15 July 1981) is a Malaysian professional football coach and former player who played as a centre-back. He is a former member of the Malaysia national team. With a calm character and good at controlling the situation in the penalty box, have led him to be compared to compatriot Soh Chin Ann.

== Club career ==
=== Negeri Sembilan ===
He made his first appearance in professional football with Negeri Sembilan in 2001.

=== Pahang ===
He moved to Pahang with a high-profile transfer after spending many years with Negeri Sembilan. Pahang was delighted with his signing and said 'Zamani is Malaysia's best defender this time'. He made superb performances with his new club. He played in the ASEAN Club Championship with other clubs in Southeast Asia, such as Tampines Rovers.

=== KL Plus FC ===
He wants to move to another club after underperformance with Pahang. He said that he wants to move because Pahang have more difficulties after his former teammate, Indra Putra Mahayuddin moved to Selangor. He later transfer to KL PLUS FC.

=== Return to Negeri Sembilan ===
Norhafiz joined Negeri Sembilan for the 2011 Liga Super season. After spent 3 seasons playing with Negeri Sembilan, he moved to Kelantan on 2015.

=== Kelantan ===
On 1 December 2014, Norhafiz signed to Kelantan for 2015 season after spent 4 seasons playing for Negeri Sembilan. Norhafiz made his Kelantan debut on 1 March 2015 as a substitute in the 69th for Badhri Radzi in a league match lost to Kedah. He made a strong defence partnership with Jonathan McKain. Norhafiz also operated as a defensive midfielder during his time at Kelantan. He made 18 league appearances during his debut season with Kelantan. On 27 December 2016, although the team was having financial problems, he has confirmed to remain with Kelantan for the third season despite offers from other clubs.

=== Penang ===
In 2018, he signed a one-year contract to play for Penang.

=== Return again to Negeri Sembilan and retired ===
Norhafiz return again to Negeri Sembilan and finally retired in 2020.

== International career ==
=== National team ===
He was one of the players who won a silver medal at the 2001 SEA Games in Kuala Lumpur. In 2002, Norhafiz was called up for an international friendly match against Brazil. He also was part of the squad in the 2004 AFF Championship which finished at third place.

He then became the part of the national football team preparing for the 2007 AFC Asian Cup. He was then chosen into the squad of Malaysia 2007 Asian Cup. He only made his first appearance in the Asian Cup in the first group match against China where Malaysia had heavy defeated 1–5. After this run of bad luck, he became one of three senior players to play at the 2007 Merdeka Tournament. With a combination of senior and U-23 players, Malaysia defeated Myanmar 3–1 in the final to win the trophy.

At the 2008 Merdeka Tournament, Norhafiz helped Malaysia reach the final but his missed shot during the penalty shoot-out against Vietnam lost Malaysia the match.

At November 2010, Malaysia coach, K. Rajagopal called up Norhafiz for the 2010 AFF Suzuki Cup, but he was injured during the 2010 Asian Games and replaced by Razman Roslan.

=== Malaysia XI ===
Norhafiz also appeared for the Malaysia League XI. He was selected by coach as a defender in the Malaysia squad in a preseason friendly against Manchester United. At the inaugural Premier League Asia Trophy that involved two more English clubs Birmingham City and Newcastle United. After losing to Chelsea in the opening game, Malaysia competed for the 3rd place against Birmingham City. After the game which Malaysia lost, then manager of Birmingham City, Steve Bruce) was asked to single out a Malaysian player which had impressed him, his answer was Norhafiz Zamani Misbah. He featured and captained the Malaysia XI in the 2 matches friendly against Manchester United in July 2009. Furthermore, on 21 July 2011, Norhafiz captained the Malaysia League XI in a match against Chelsea, which ended in a 0–1 loss for the Malaysia League XI.

== Managerial career ==
On 1 February 2021, Norhafiz was hired to become assistant coach for Mokhtar Dahari Academy to aid producing quality young players from the grassroots development program.

== Career statistics ==
=== Club statistics ===
As of match played 8 August 2018.

Club performance			League		Cup		League Cup		Continental		Total	
Season	Club	League	Apps	Goals	Apps	Goals	Apps	Goals	Apps	Goals	Apps	Goals
2015	Kelantan	Malaysia Super League	18	0	6	0	4 (Note: Appearances in Malaysia Cup)	0	–		28	0
2016	Kelantan	Malaysia Super League	13	0	2	0	5	0	–		20	0
2017	Kelantan	Malaysia Super League	15	0	1	0	3	0	–		19	0
Total			46	0	9	0	12	0	0	0	67	0
2018	Penang	Malaysia Premier League	19	0	2	0	1 (Note: Appearances in Challenge Cup)	0	–		22	0
Career total			64	0	11	0	13	0	0	0	89	0

=== International ===
Appearances and goals by national team and year
National team	Year	Apps	Goals
Malaysia	2001	7	0
Malaysia	2002	8	0
Malaysia	2003	6	1
Malaysia	2004	8	0
Malaysia	2005	2	0
Malaysia	2006	7	0
Malaysia	2007	13	1
Malaysia	2008	10	0
Malaysia	2009	6	0
Malaysia	2010	2	0
Malaysia	2011	2	0
Total		71	2

Scores and results list Malaysia's goal tally first, score column indicates score after each Zamani goal.

List of international goals scored by Norhafiz Zamani
No.	Date	Venue	Opponent	Score	Result	Competition
1	12 October 2003	Bukit Jalil National Stadium, Kuala Lumpur, Malaysia	Bahrain	2–2	2–2	2004 AFC Asian Cup qualification
2	24 March 2007	Sugathadasa Stadium, Colombo, Sri Lanka	Sri Lanka	4–1	4–1	Friendly

== Honours ==
=== Club ===
Negeri Sembilan

- Malaysia FA Cup: 2003
- Malaysia Cup: 2011
- Charity Cup: 2012; runner-up 2004

Pahang

- Malaysia Super League: runner-up 2005
- Malaysia FA Cup: 2006
- ASEAN Club Championship: runner-up 2005

Kelantan

- Malaysia FA Cup: runners up 2015

=== International ===
Malaysia U-23

- Sea Games (silver) Silver:2001

Malaysia

- AFF Championship: 2004 third place
- Pestabola Merdeka: 2007

=== Individual ===
- Malaysia Super League 'Best Defender Award': 2011
