= Ricardo Pires =

Brazilian footballer (born 1987)

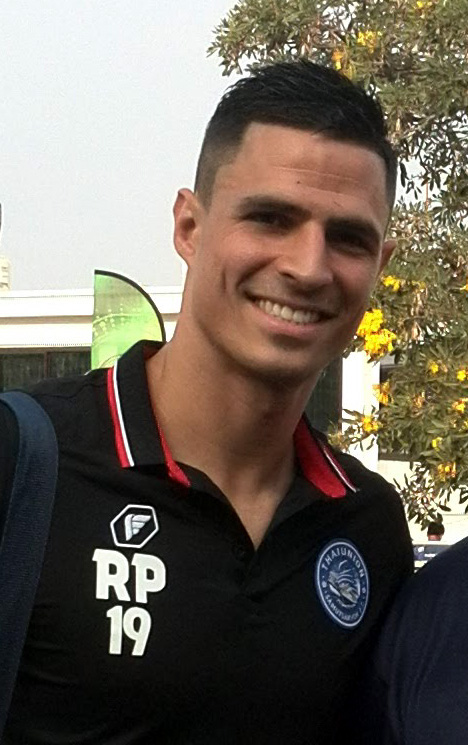

Personal information
- Full name: Ricardo Pires Santos Júnior
- Date of birth: 22 September 1987 (age 39)
- Place of birth: Rio de Janeiro, Brazil
- Height: 1.88 m (6 ft 2 in)
- Position: Forward

Team information
- Current team: Negeri Sembilan FC
- Number: 9

Youth career
- 2004–2005: Vasco da Gama
- 2006: Barcelona EC

Senior career*
Years	Team	Apps	(Gls)
2008	Depor Aguablanca	27	(17)
2008–2009	Sportfreunde Siegen	18	(9)
2009–2010	Tondela	36	(10)
2010–2011	Independência	17	(5)
2011–2012	Rio Branco	20	(5)
2013	Sinop	31	(14)
2014–2016	Lusitano	28	(4)
2016	Anadia	12	(3)
2016–2017	Farense	8	(0)
2017	Castelo Branco	10	(2)
2017–2018	Marinhese	14	(3)
2018–2019	Sertanense	11	(2)
2019	Samut Sakhon	11	(3)
2019	Potros UAEM	5	(0)
2020	Jicaral	4	(0)
2020–2021	Tarxien Rainbows	2	(0)
2021–2022	MH Khon Surat City	10	(1)
2022	Barreirense	9	(2)
2022	Doxa Drama	10	(2)
2022–2023	Zakynthos	13	(0)
2023	Monte Carlo	0	(0)
2023	Persiraja Banda Aceh	4	(2)
2024	DP Kanchanaburi	15	(7)
2024	Negeri Sembilan FC	10	(0)
- * Club domestic league appearances and goals as of 12 May 2025

Ricardo Pires Santos Júnior (born 22 September 1987), or simply Ricardo Pires, is a professional footballer who plays as a forward for Malaysia Super League club Negeri Sembilan. Born in Brazil, he represents Thailand at international level.

== Club career ==
Born in Rio de Janeiro, he joined several overseas clubs, such as Colombia, Germany, Portugal, Thailand, Mexico, Costa Rica, Malta, Greece and finally decided to abroad to East Asia and join Macau Liga de Elite side Monte Carlo for the 2023 season. On 23 August 2023, Pires made his club debut in a 1–2 home lose in the 2023–24 AFC Cup qualifying play-offs against Taiwanese club Taichung Futuro.

=== Persiraja Banda Aceh ===
Ahead of the 2023–24 Liga 2, Pires signed a contract with Persiraja Banda Aceh. Pires made his Persiraja debut in a pre-season International friendly match against Malaysia Super League club PDRM on 3 September 2023, also scored his first goal for the club in a 4–0 win.
