= 2021 Johor Darul Ta'zim F.C. season =

Johor Darul Ta'zim
2021 season
- Chairman: Tunku Tun Aminah Sultan Ibrahim
- Head Coach: Benjamin Mora
- Stadium: Sultan Ibrahim Stadium
- Super League: 1st
- FA Cup: Cancelled
- Malaysia Cup: Runners-up
- Charity Shield: Winners
- Champions League: Group stage
- Top goalscorer: League: Bérgson (23); All: Bérgson (30)
- Biggest win: 5–0 vs Perak (H), 31 July 2021, Super League
- Biggest defeat: 1–4 vs Pohang Steelers (A), 28 June 2021, Champions League
Home colours	Away colours

The 2021 season is Johor Darul Ta'zim Football Club's 48th season in club history and 8th season in the Malaysia Super League after rebranding their name from Johor FC.

== Season overview ==

Johor Darul Ta'zim's usual lineup in the 2021 season

The 2021 season was a successful one for Johor Darul Ta'zim, as the club won an eighth consecutive Malaysia Super League title, though they fell short in the Malaysia Cup final and were eliminated in the group stage of the AFC Champions League.

=== Super League ===
JDT clinched their eighth consecutive Malaysia Super League title on 28 August 2021, with two matches still remaining, underlining their dominance at the top of Malaysian football. The campaign ran from 5 March to 12 September 2021, with JDT finishing comfortably clear at the top of the table, winning 18, drawing 3, and losing only once in 22 matches, scoring 50 goals and conceding just 9. The title was sealed with a 3–0 win over Sri Pahang at Sultan Ibrahim Stadium on 27 August, with Bérgson scoring a hat-trick in the 8th, 41st, and 45th minutes. Notable results earlier in the campaign included a 5–0 thrashing of Perak on 31 July, in which Bérgson also scored a hat-trick, and a 4–0 win over UiTM. Terengganu were the only side to beat JDT that season, while Kedah Darul Aman finished as runners-up.

=== Malaysia Cup ===
JDT entered the 2021 Malaysia Cup as defending champions, looking to retain the trophy they had won in 2019 after the 2020 edition was cancelled midway through the tournament due to the pandemic. Drawn into Group D alongside Sabah, Petaling Jaya City, and Kelantan, JDT topped the group with six wins from six matches, scoring 14 goals and conceding just one, including a 3–0 win over Sabah at home and a 2–0 win over Kelantan. In the quarter-finals, they defeated Kedah Darul Aman 1–0 on aggregate, drawing 0–0 away before winning the return leg 1–0 at home. In the semi-finals, JDT beat Terengganu 4–1 on aggregate, drawing 1–1 away before winning the return leg 3–0 at home to reach the final. However, in the final played on 30 November at the Bukit Jalil National Stadium, JDT were stunned 2–0 by Kuala Lumpur City, with goals from Zhafri Yahya and Paulo Josué, who ended their own 32-year title drought and denied JDT a second consecutive Malaysia Cup triumph.

=== AFC Champion League ===
Competing in the AFC Champions League for the third time in the club's history, JDT were drawn into Group G alongside Japanese side Nagoya Grampus, Thai club BG Pathum United, Chinese side Beijing Guoan, and Thai club Ratchaburi Mitr Phol. Their campaign opened on 22 June with a 0–1 defeat to Nagoya Grampus at the Rajamangala National Stadium in Bangkok, with a late Bergson header ruled out for a foul in the build-up. JDT's group-stage form faltered throughout, and they finished third in the group with just 1 win, 1 draw, and 4 defeats from 6 matches, scoring 3 goals and conceding 9 for a goal difference of −6. The group-stage exit meant JDT bowed out in disappointing fashion, having been tipped as a possible last-16 contender before the tournament began.

== Squad ==
=== Johor Darul Ta'zim F.C. ===
As of 21 Oct 2020.

Squad No.	Name	Nationality	Date of birth (age)	Previous club	Contract since	Contract end
Goalkeepers
1	Farizal Marlias	(Malaysia)	29 June 1986 (age 40)	(Malaysia) Selangor FA	2015	2021
24	Izham Tarmizi	(Malaysia)	24 April 1991 (age 35)	(Malaysia) Harimau Muda A	2014	2021
26	Haziq Nadzli	(Malaysia)	6 January 1998 (age 28)	(Malaysia) PDRM FC	2017	2022
Defenders
2	Matthew Davies	(Malaysia) (Australia)	7 February 1995 (age 31)	(Malaysia) Sri Pahang F.C.	2020	
3	Adam Nor Azlin	(Malaysia)	5 January 1996 (age 30)	(Malaysia) Selangor F.C.	2018	
7	Aidil Zafuan	(Malaysia)	3 August 1987 (age 39)	(Malaysia) ATM FA	2013	
12	S. Kunanlan	(Malaysia)	15 September 1986 (age 40)	(Malaysia) Selangor FA	2015	2021
14	Shane Lowry	(Australia) (Republic of Ireland)	12 June 1989 (age 37)	(Qatar) Al Ahli SC	2021	2023
20	Azrif Nasrulhaq	(Malaysia)	27 May 1991 (age 35)	(Malaysia) Selangor F.C.	2016	2021
22	La'Vere Corbin-Ong	(Malaysia) (Barbados) (Canada) (England)	21 April 1991 (age 35)	(Netherlands) Go Ahead Eagles	2018	
27	Fadhli Shas	(Malaysia)	21 January 1991 (age 35)	(Slovenia) FC ViOn Zlaté Moravce	2014	2021
32	Shahrul Saad	(Malaysia)	8 July 1993 (age 33)	(Malaysia) Perak TBG F.C.	2021	2021
33	Maurício	(Brazil)	20 September 1988 (age 38)	(Italy) S.S. Lazio	2019	
Midfielders
4	Afiq Fazail	(Malaysia)	29 September 1994 (age 32)	(Malaysia) Harimau Muda B	2015	
5	Syamer Kutty Abba	(Malaysia)	1 October 1997 (age 29)	(Portugal) Vilaverdense F.C.	2018	2022
8	Safiq Rahim	(Malaysia)	5 July 1987 (age 39)	(Malaysia) Melaka United	2021	
10	Leandro Velázquez	(Argentina)	10 May 1989 (age 37)	(Colombia) Rionegro Águilas	2019	
11	Gonzalo Cabrera	(Iraq) (Argentina)	15 January 1989 (age 37)	(Saudi Arabia) Al-Faisaly FC	2017	2022
13	Mohamadou Sumareh	(Malaysia) (The Gambia)	20 September 1994 (age 32)	(Thailand) Police Tero F.C.	2021	
16	Danial Amier Norhisham	(Malaysia)	27 March 1997 (age 29)	(Malaysia) FELDA United F.C.	2021	2022
21	Nazmi Faiz	(Malaysia)	16 August 1994 (age 32)	(Malaysia) Johor Darul Ta'zim II	2017	
30	Natxo Insa	(Malaysia) (Spain)	9 June 1986 (age 40)	(Spain) Levante UD	2017	2022
41	Chia Rou Han	(Malaysia)	1 September 2001 (age 25)	(Malaysia) Johor Darul Ta'zim III F.C.	2021	
71	Syahrian Abimanyu	(Indonesia)	25 April 1999 (age 27)	(Australia) Newcastle Jets FC	2021	2021
38	Nathaniel Shio Hong Wan	(Malaysia) (England)	17 August 2000 (age 26)	(England) Wolverhampton Wanderers U23	2021	2022
Strikers
9	Bergson da Silva	(Brazil)	9 February 1991 (age 35)	(Brazil) Fortaleza Esporte Clube	2021	2021
17	Ramadhan Saifullah	(Malaysia)	9 December 2000 (age 25)	Youth Team	2020	
18	Hazwan Bakri	(Malaysia)	19 June 1991 (age 35)	(Malaysia) Selangor FA	2017	2021
19	Akhyar Rashid	(Malaysia)	1 May 1999 (age 27)	(Malaysia) Kedah FA	2019	2023
28	Syafiq Ahmad	(Malaysia)	28 June 1995 (age 31)	(Malaysia) Kedah FA	2018	
29	Safawi Rasid	(Malaysia)	5 March 1997 (age 29)	(Portugal) Portimonense SC	2017	2022
31	Guilherme de Paula	(Malaysia) (Brazil)	11 September 1986 (age 40)	(Malaysia) Perak TBG F.C.	2021	2021
42	Arif Aiman Hanapi	(Malaysia)	4 May 2002 (age 24)	(Malaysia) Johor Darul Ta'zim III F.C.	2020	2020
99	Fernando Rodríguez	(Spain)	11 May 1987 (age 39)	(Malaysia) Johor Darul Ta'zim II F.C.	2020	
On loan / Left during mid season
88	Liridon Krasniqi	(Malaysia) (Kosovo)	1 January 1992 (age 34)	(Malaysia) Melaka United	2020	
69	Jonathan Herrera	(Argentina)	16 September 1991 (age 35)	(Argentina) Deportivo Riestra	2021	2023
14	Hariss Harun	(Singapore)	19 November 1990 (age 35)	(Singapore) Home United	2014	
6	Syazwan Andik	(Malaysia)	4 August 1996 (age 30)	(Malaysia) Kuala Lumpur City F.C.	2019	
15	Feroz Baharudin	(Malaysia)	2 April 2000 (age 26)	(Malaysia) Johor Darul Ta'zim II F.C.	2021	

=== Johor Darul Ta'zim II F.C. ===
As of 21 Oct 2020.

Squad No.	Name	Nationality	Date of birth (age)	Previous club	Contract since	Contract end
Goalkeepers
1	T. Shaheeswaran	(Malaysia)	21 October 1999 (age 27)	(Malaysia) Johor Darul Ta'zim III F.C.	2019	
22	Hafiz Azizi	(Malaysia)	5 August 2001 (age 25)	(Malaysia) Johor Darul Ta'zim III F.C.	2019	
27	Rozaimi Rahamat	(Malaysia)	14 May 1996 (age 30)	(Malaysia) Johor Darul Ta'zim III F.C.	2019	
Defenders
2	Nafizuddin Fauzi	(Malaysia)	16 February 2001 (age 25)	(Malaysia) Johor Darul Ta'zim III F.C.	2021	
3	Firdaus Khairul Asyraff Ramli	(Malaysia)	10 March 2002 (age 24)	(Malaysia) Johor Darul Ta'zim III F.C.	2021	
4	Adib Zainudin	(Malaysia)	15 February 1995 (age 31)	(Malaysia) Felcra F.C.	2020	2020
6	Hafiy Haikal	(Malaysia)	24 April 1998 (age 28)	(Malaysia) Johor Darul Ta'zim III F.C.	2020	
12	Shane Lowry	(Australia) (Republic of Ireland)	12 June 1989 (age 37)	(Qatar) Al Ahli SC	2021	
16	Umar Hakeem	(Malaysia)	26 August 2002 (age 24)	(Malaysia) Johor Darul Ta'zim III F.C.	2020	
17	Alif Mutalib	(Malaysia)	16 January 2002 (age 24)	(Malaysia) Johor Darul Ta'zim III F.C.	2020	
30	Kiko Insa	(Malaysia)	25 January 1988 (age 38)	(Malaysia) Johor Darul Ta'zim F.C.	2018	
51	Feroz Baharudin	(Malaysia)	2 April 2000 (age 26)	(Malaysia) Johor Darul Ta'zim II F.C.	2021	
60	Syazwan Andik	(Malaysia)	4 August 1996 (age 30)	(Malaysia) Kuala Lumpur City F.C.	2019	
Midfielders
5	Ali Imran	(Malaysia)	30 May 2002 (age 24)	(Malaysia) Johor Darul Ta'zim III F.C.	2021	
7	Irfan Fazail	(Malaysia)	12 April 1991 (age 35)	(Malaysia) Johor Darul Ta'zim F.C.	2016	
8	Kei Hirose	(Japan)	20 November 1995 (age 30)	(Indonesia) Persela Lamongan	2020	
10	Nicolás Fernández	(Argentina)	17 November 1986 (age 39)	(Greece) Asteras Tripolis F.C.	2017	
11	Khairullah Halim	(Malaysia)	21 May 1997 (age 29)	(Malaysia) Johor Darul Ta'zim III F.C.	2021	
13	Aysar Hadi	(Malaysia)	4 September 2003 (age 23)	(Malaysia) Johor Darul Ta'zim III F.C.	2021	
14	Chia Rou Han	(Malaysia)	1 September 2001 (age 25)	(Malaysia) Johor Darul Ta'zim III F.C.	2021	
20	Danial Haqim	(Malaysia)	29 August 1998 (age 28)	(Malaysia) Kelantan FA	2020	
21	Danish Azli	(Malaysia)	7 March 2003 (age 23)	(Malaysia) Johor Darul Ta'zim III F.C.	2021	
22	Stuart Wilkin	(Malaysia) (England)	12 March 1999 (age 27)	(United States) Missouri State University	2021	
23	Amirul Husaini Zamri	(Malaysia)	14 October 2000 (age 26)	(Malaysia) Johor Darul Ta'zim III F.C.	2021	
29	Rafiefikri Rosman	(Malaysia)	13 June 2002 (age 24)	(Malaysia) Johor Darul Ta'zim III F.C.	2020	
Forwards
9	Fernando Rodríguez	(Spain)	11 May 1987 (age 39)	(Malaysia) Kedah Darul Aman F.C.	2021	2021
18	Awang Muhammad Faiz Hazziq	(Malaysia)	6 March 1999 (age 27)	(Malaysia) Johor Darul Ta'zim III F.C.	2020	
19	Gabriel Nistelrooy	(Malaysia)	25 April 2000 (age 26)	(Malaysia) Johor Darul Ta'zim III F.C.	2021	
Players who had left or loan to other clubs
2	Che Rashid	(Malaysia)	17 December 1994 (age 31)	(Malaysia) Johor Darul Ta'zim F.C.	2019	
15	Gary Steven Robbat	(Malaysia)	3 September 1992 (age 34)	(Malaysia) Johor Darul Ta'zim F.C.	2020	
23	Hasbullah Abu Bakar	(Malaysia)	26 October 1994 (age 32)	(Malaysia) Johor Darul Ta'zim F.C.	2018	
	S.Kumaahran	(Malaysia)	3 July 1996 (age 30)	(Malaysia) Pahang FA	2021	
26	Luis Ignacio Cabrera	(Argentina)	7 January 1994 (age 32)		2020	

== Transfers and contracts ==
=== In ===
No.	Pos.	Name	Age	Moving from	Type	Transfer Date	Transfer fee
16	MF	(Malaysia) Danial Amier Norhisham	29	(Malaysia) FELDA United F.C.	Transfer	1 December 2020	2 years contract. Free
29	FW	(Malaysia) Safawi Rasid	29	(Portugal) Portimonense SC	Loan Return	1 January 2021	Free
22	MF	(Malaysia) Stuart Wilkin	27	(United States) Missouri State Bears football	Transfer	1 January 2021	Free
9	FW	(Argentina) Jonathan Herrera	35	(Argentina) Deportivo Riestra	Transfer	1 January 2021	US$800,000 (MYR3,200,000)
	MF	(Indonesia) Syahrian Abimanyu	27	(Indonesia) Madura United F.C.	Transfer	1 January 2021	Free
13	FW	(Malaysia) Mohamadou Sumareh	32	(Thailand) Police Tero F.C.	Transfer	9 February 2021	Free
8	MF	(Malaysia) Safiq Rahim	39	(Malaysia) Melaka United	Transfer	10 February 2021	Free
9	FW	(Brazil) Bergson da Silva	35	(Brazil) Fortaleza Esporte Clube	Loan	28 February 2021	US$100,000 (MYR400,000) loan till June 2021
32	DF	(Malaysia) Shahrul Saad	33	(Malaysia) Perak F.C.	Transfer	8 May 2021	Undisclosed
31	FW	(Malaysia) Guilherme de Paula	40	(Malaysia) Perak F.C.	Transfer	8 May 2021	Undisclosed
14	DF	(Australia) (Republic of Ireland) Shane Lowry	37	(Qatar) Al Ahli SC	Transfer	20 May 2021	Free
9	FW	(Brazil) Bergson da Silva	35	(Brazil) Fortaleza Esporte Clube	Transfer	20 May 2021	US$400,000 (MYR1,600,000)
71	MF	(Indonesia) Syahrian Abimanyu	27	(Australia) Newcastle Jets FC	End of loan	1 June 2021	NA
38	MF	(Malaysia) (England) Nathaniel Shio Hong Wan	26	(England) Wolverhampton Wanderers U23	Transfer	1 July 2021	Free

Note Shane Lowry played for the 1st team in the AFC Champions League but the Malaysia Premier League (Tier 2)

Nathaniel Shio was allocated to Malaysia Premier League squad

=== Out ===
No.	Pos.	Name	Age	Moving to	Type	Transfer Date	Transfer fee
8	FW	(Brazil) Diogo Luís Santo	39	(Thailand) BG Pathum United F.C.	Transfer	30 November 2020	Free
	FW	(Malaysia) Rozaimi Rahman	34	(Malaysia) Kedah FA	Transfer	20 December 2020	Free
	DF	(Malaysia) Che Rashid	31	(Malaysia) Melaka United	Season loan	1 January 2021	Undisclosed
	DF	(Malaysia) Hasbullah Abu Bakar	32	(Malaysia) Melaka United	Season loan	1 January 2021	Undisclosed
	FW	(Malaysia) S.Kumaahran	30	(Malaysia) Melaka United	Season loan	1 January 2021	Undisclosed
	DF	(Malaysia) Fazly Mazlan	32	(Malaysia) Sri Pahang F.C.	Season loan	1 January 2021	Undisclosed
	MF	(Indonesia) Syahrian Abimanyu	27	(Australia) Newcastle Jets FC	Season loan	1 January 2021	Undisclosed
88	MF	(Malaysia) Liridon Krasniqi	34	(Australia) Newcastle Jets FC	Season loan	1 January 2021	Undisclosed
9	FW	(Argentina) Jonathan Herrera	35	(Argentina) Club Atlético Independiente	Season loan	18 February 2021	1 Year loan with option to buy at US$1,300,000 (MYR5,200,000)
14	MF	(Singapore) Hariss Harun	36	(Singapore) Lion City Sailors F.C.	Transfer	10 May 2021	Undisclosed
	MF	(Malaysia) Gary Steven Robbat	34	(Malaysia) Melaka United	Season loan	31 May 2021	Undisclosed
14	DF	(Australia) (Republic of Ireland) Shane Lowry	37	(Malaysia) Johor Darul Ta'zim II F.C.	Transfer	25 July 2021	Free
15	DF	(Malaysia) Feroz Baharudin	26	(Malaysia) Johor Darul Ta'zim II F.C.	Season loan	25 July 2021	Free
6	DF	(Malaysia) Syazwan Andik	30	(Malaysia) Johor Darul Ta'zim II F.C.	Season loan	25 July 2021	Free
88	MF	(Malaysia) Liridon Krasniqi	34	(India) Odisha FC	Season loan	31 July 2021	Undisclosed

Krasniqi returned from his loan from Newcastle Jets before going to Odisha FC.

=== Retained ===
Position	Player	Ref
GK	(Malaysia) Farizal Marlias	
DF	(Malaysia) Syazwan Andik	
DF	(Malaysia) Azrif Nasrulhaq	
DF	(Malaysia) Feroz Baharudin	
DF	(Malaysia) Adam Nor Azlin	
DF	(Malaysia) Aidil Zafuan	
DF	(Malaysia) S. Kunanlan	
MF	(Malaysia) Nazmi Faiz	
MF	(Malaysia) Ramadhan Saifullah	
MF	(Malaysia) Gary Steven Robbat	
MF	(Malaysia) Natxo Insa	1 years contract signed in Oct 2021
FW	(Malaysia) Hazwan Bakri	
FW	(Malaysia) Akhyar Rashid	
FW	(Australia) (Republic of Ireland) Shane Lowry	2 years contract signed in 2021

== Competitions ==
=== Overview ===
Competition	First match	Last match	Starting round	Final position	Record							
Competition	First match	Last match	Starting round	Final position	Pld	W	D	L	GF	GA	GD	Win %
Malaysia Super League (Note: Includes the Charity Shield.)	5 March 2021	12 September 2021	Matchday 1	Winners	22	18	3	1	50	9	+41	81.82
Malaysia Cup	27 September 2021	30 November 2021	Group stage	Runners-up	11	8	2	1	19	4	+15	72.73
AFC Champions League	22 June 2021	7 July 2021	Group stage	Group stage	6	1	1	4	3	9	−6	16.67
Total					39	27	6	6	72	22	+50	69.23

Last updated: 30 November 2021
Source: Competitions

=== Malaysia Super League ===
==== Table ====
Pos	Team	Pld	W	D	L	GF	GA	GD	Pts	Qualification or relegation
1	Johor Darul Ta'zim (C)	22	18	3	1	50	9	+41	57	Qualification for AFC Champions League group stage
2	Kedah Darul Aman	22	13	4	5	44	28	+16	43	Qualification for AFC Cup group stage
3	Penang	22	12	5	5	37	30	+7	41	
4	Terengganu	22	11	5	6	33	20	+13	38	
5	Selangor	22	10	6	6	45	30	+15	36	
6	Kuala Lumpur City	22	8	9	5	27	20	+7	33 (Note: KL City qualified to 2022 AFC Cup as winner of 2021 Malaysia Cup)	Qualification for AFC Cup group stage
7	Petaling Jaya City	22	6	6	10	16	28	−12	24	
8	Melaka United	22	5	9	8	25	31	−6	21 (Note: Melaka have been docked three points based on the following of the decision from FAM (Football Association of Malaysia).)	
9	Sabah	22	4	7	11	21	38	−17	19	
10	Sri Pahang	22	4	6	12	23	37	−14	18	
11	Perak (R)	22	4	4	14	20	45	−25	16	Relegation to Malaysia Premier League
12	UiTM (R)	22	3	4	15	16	41	−25	13	Relegation to Malaysia Premier League

Source: Malaysian Football League
Rules for classification: 1) Points; 2) Goal difference; 3) Number of goals scored.
(C) Champions; (R) Relegated

==== Malaysia Super League fixtures and results ====
Win Draw Loss

5 March 2021 1	Johor Darul Ta'zim	2–0	Kedah Darul Aman	Johor
	Safawi Rasid 35'; Natxo Insa 68'; Maurício (yellow card) 30'; Leandro Velazquez (yellow card) 39'			Stadium: Sultan Ibrahim Stadium; Referee: Nazmi Nasaruddin

9 March 2021 2	Johor Darul Ta'zim	2–0	Penang	Johor
	Leandro Velazquez 81' (pen.) (yellow card) 53'; Fernando Rodríguez 85'; Matthew Davies (yellow card) 27'; Gonzalo Cabrera (yellow card) 70'		D. Saarvindran (yellow card) 35'; Casagrande (yellow card) 39'; Rafael Vitor (yellow card) 45'; Samuel Somerville (yellow card) 60'; Azwan Aripin (yellow card) 72'; Khairul Akmal (yellow card) 85'	Stadium: Sultan Ibrahim Stadium; Referee: S. Logeswaran

13 March 2021 3	UiTM	0–4	Johor Darul Ta'zim	Shah Alam
	Fauzi Latif (yellow card) 85'		Arif Aiman Hanapi 11'; Gonzalo Cabrera 15'; Bergson 80'; Syamer Kutty Abba 90+2'; La’Vere Corbin-Ong (yellow card) 85'	Stadium: UiTM Stadium

17 March 2021 4	Johor Darul Ta'zim	1–1	Selangor	Johor
	Bergson 80'		Ifedayo Olusegun 7'; Oliver Buff (yellow card) 44'; Tim Heubach (yellow card) 57'; Zikri Khalili (yellow card) 78'	Stadium: Sultan Ibrahim Stadium

21 March 2021 5	Perak	2–2	Johor Darul Ta'zim	Ipoh
21:00 UTC+8	Guilherme de Paula 33' 58' (yellow card) 35'; Careca (yellow card) 29'; Kenny Pallraj (yellow card) 43'; Hafizul Hakim (yellow card) 71'; Rafiuddin Roddin (yellow card) 90+3'		Akhyar Rashid 74'; Leandro Velazquez 90+3' (pen.); Natxo Insa (yellow card) 21'; Aidil Zafuan (yellow card) 23'; Maurício (yellow card) 85'	Stadium: Perak Stadium; Referee: Noor Azriel Baharuddin

2 April 2021 6	Johor Darul Ta'zim	3–0	Melaka United	Johor
	Adam Nor Azlin 3'; Bergson 8' 82'; Hariss Harun (yellow card) 58'		Syamim Yahya (yellow card) 63'; Wan Amirul Afiq (yellow card) 68'	Stadium: Sultan Ibrahim Stadium; Referee: Razlan Joffri Ali

6 April 2021 7	Sabah	1–4	Johor Darul Ta'zim	Kota Kinabalu
21:00 UTC+8	Lévy Madinda 57' (pen.); Alto Linus (yellow card) 17'; Maxsius Musa (yellow card) 48' (yellow-red card) 59'	Report	Arif Aiman Hanapi 4' (yellow card) 51'; Bergson 8' 68'; Leandro Velazquez 87' (pen.); Natxo Insa (yellow card) 34'; Maurício (yellow card) 49'	Stadium: Likas Stadium

10 April 2021 8	Johor Darul Ta'zim	3–0	Petaling Jaya City	Johor
	Gonzalo Cabrera 1'; Bergson 20' 30'	Report		Stadium: Sultan Ibrahim Stadium

16 April 2021 9	Sri Pahang	0–2	Johor Darul Ta'zim	Kuantan
21:00 UTC+8	Azam Azih (yellow card) 51'; Ezanie Salleh (yellow card) 69' (yellow-red card)	Report	Leandro Velazquez 21'; Bergson 90+2' (yellow card) 39'; Gonzalo Cabrera (yellow card) 45'; La’Vere Corbin-Ong (yellow card) 73'	Stadium: Darul Makmur Stadium; Referee: Tuan Yasin

24 April 2021 10 (Rescheduled)	Johor Darul Ta'zim	0–1	Terengganu	Johor
	Afiq Fazail (yellow card) 17'; Natxo Insa (yellow card) 62'	Report	Hakimi Abdullah 57'; Dechi Marcel N'Guessan (yellow card) 9'; Rahmat Makasuf (yellow card) 86'; Arif Anwar (yellow card) 90'	Stadium: Sultan Ibrahim Stadium; Referee: Zulkarnian Zakaria

30 April 2021 11 (Rescheduled)	Kuala Lumpur City	1–1	Johor Darul Ta'zim	Kuala Lumpur
21:00 UTC+8	Romel Morales 45+3'; Hadin Azman (yellow card) 11'	Report	Hariss Harun 55'; Aidil Zafuan (yellow card) 18'; Matthew Davies (yellow card) 25'	Stadium: Kuala Lumpur Stadium

4 May 2021 12 (Rescheduled)	Kedah Darul Aman	0–1	Johor Darul Ta'zim	Alor Setar
	Amirul Hisyam (yellow card) 12'; Renan Alves (yellow card) 58'; Kpah Sherman (yellow card) 90+4'; Azamuddin Akil (yellow card) 90+7'	Report	Bergson 90+2' (pen.); Maurício Nascimento (yellow card) 41'; Matthew Davies (yellow card) 79'; Leandro Velazquez (yellow card) 90+4'	Stadium: Darul Aman Stadium; Referee: Razlan Joffri Ali

8 May 2021 13 (Rescheduled)	Penang	0–3	Johor Darul Ta'zim	Penang
	Casagrande (yellow card) 78' (yellow-red card) 88'; Aidil Zafuan (yellow card) 18'; D. Saarvindran (yellow card) 88'; Danial Ashraf (yellow card) 90+1'; Tomáš Trucha (red card) 90'	Report	Safawi Rasid 15'; Bergson 42'; Mohamadou Sumareh 51'; Aidil Zafuan (yellow card) 62'; S. Kunanlan (yellow card) 81'	Stadium: City Stadium

25 July 2021 14	Johor Darul Ta'zim	3–1	UiTM	Johor
21:00 UTC+8	Gonzalo Cabrera 50'; Safawi Rasid 73'; Bergson 88'; Natxo Insa (yellow card) 68'; Azrif Nasrulhaq (yellow card) 72'	Report	Joel Vinicius 43'; Kwon Yong-hyun (yellow card) 72'	Stadium: Sultan Ibrahim Stadium

28 July 2021 15	Selangor	1–3	Johor Darul Ta'zim	Petaling Jaya, Selangor
21:00 UTC+8	Ifedayo Olusegun 62'; Oliver Buff (yellow card) 31'; Jordan Ayimbila (yellow card) 82'	Report	Bergson da Silva 45+1'; Matthew Davies 79'; Mohamadou Sumareh 90+3' Safiq Rahim (yellow card) 84'	Stadium: MBPJ Stadium; Attendance: 0 Referee: Nazmi Nasaruddin

31 July 2021 16	Johor Darul Ta'zim	5–0	Perak	Iskandar Puteri
	Bergson da Silva 20', 47', 59', (yellow card) 68'; Gonzalo Cabrera 83', 86' (pen.) Shane Lowry (yellow card) 49'	Report	Danish Haziq (yellow card) 50'; Zulkiffli Zakaria (yellow card) 58'; Amirul Azhan (yellow card) 68'	Stadium: Sultan Ibrahim Stadium; Attendance: 0 Referee: Tuan Mohd Yaasin Tuan Mohd Hanafiah

3 August 2021 17	Melaka United	0–1	Johor Darul Ta'zim	Malacca
21:00 UTC+8	Bergson 2' (pen.)} Matthew Davies (yellow card) 51'; Arif Aiman (yellow card) 84'	Report		Stadium: Hang Jebat Stadium

8 August 2021 18	Johor Darul Ta'zim	2–0	Sabah	Johor
	Bergson 19' 21'	Report		Stadium: Sultan Ibrahim Stadium

21 August 2021 19	Petaling Jaya City	0–2	Johor Darul Ta'zim	Petaling Jaya
		Report	Bergson 27'; Mohamadou Sumareh 83'	Stadium: Petaling Jaya Stadium

27 August 2021 20	Johor Darul Ta'zim	3–0	Sri Pahang	Johor
21:00 UTC+8	Bergson 8' 41' 45'; Leandro Velazquez (yellow card) 72'	Report	Baqiuddin Shamsudin (yellow card) 90'	Stadium: Sultan Ibrahim Stadium

4 September 2021 21	Terengganu	0–1	Johor Darul Ta'zim	Terengganu
		Report	Shane Lowry 45'	Stadium: Sultan Ismail Nasiruddin Shah Stadium

12 September 2021 22	Johor Darul Ta'zim	2–1	Kuala Lumpur City	Johor
21:00 UTC+8	Nazmi Faiz 16'; Nik Shahrul 70' (o.g.)	Report	Muhammad Izreen 25'	Stadium: Sultan Ibrahim Stadium

=== Malaysia Cup ===
Win Draw Loss

==== Group stage ====
27 September 2021 1	Johor Darul Ta'zim	2–0	Kelantan	Johor
	Bergson 30' (pen.); Safawi 49'	Report		Stadium: Sultan Ibrahim Stadium

30 September 2021 2	Johor Darul Ta'zim	1–0	Petaling Jaya City	Johor
	Gonzalo Cabrera 3'	Report		Stadium: Sultan Ibrahim Stadium

29 October 2021 3	Sabah	0–2	Johor Darul Ta'zim	Kota Kinabalu
		Report	Hazwan Bakri 4'; Gonzalo Cabrera 13'	Stadium: Likas Stadium

2 November 2021 4	Johor Darul Ta'zim	3–0	Sabah	Johor
	Velázquez 6'; Bergson 14' (pen.), 90+3'	Report		Stadium: Sultan Ibrahim Stadium

6 November 2021 5	Petaling Jaya City	1–2	Johor Darul Ta'zim	Selangor
	Ruventhiran 11'	Report	Bergson 14' (pen.); Maurício 29'	Stadium: Petaling Jaya Stadium

9 November 2021 6	Kelantan	0–4	Johor Darul Ta'zim	Kota Bharu
		Report	Syafiq 48'; Velázquez 60' (pen.); Guilherme 62'; Shahrul 90'	Stadium: Sultan Muhammad IV Stadium

==== Quarter-finals ====
14 November 2021 QF 1st leg	Kedah Darul Aman	0–0	Johor Darul Ta'zim	Alor Setar
		Report		Stadium: Darul Aman Stadium

18 November 2021 QF 1st leg	Johor Darul Ta'zim	1–0 (1–0 agg.)	Kedah Darul Aman	Iskandar Puteri
	Arif Aiman 40'	Report		Stadium: Sultan Ibrahim Stadium

Johor Darul Ta'zim won 1–0 on aggregate.

==== Semi-finals ====
22 November 2021 SF 1st leg	Terengganu	1–1	Johor Darul Ta'zim	Terengganu
	Mintah 8'	Report	Bergson 50'	Stadium: Sultan Mizan Zainal Abidin Stadium

26 November 2021 SF 1st leg	Johor Darul Ta'zim	3–0 (4–1 agg.)	Terengganu	Johor
	Bergson 6', 14'; Cabrera 10'	Report		Stadium: Sultan Ibrahim Stadium

Johor Darul Ta'zim won 4–1 on aggregate.

==== Final ====
30 November 2021 Final	Kuala Lumpur City	2−0	Johor Darul Ta'zim	Kuala Lumpur
	Zhafri Yahya 69'; Paulo Josué 74'			Stadium: Bukit Jalil National Stadium

=== AFC Champions League ===
==== Table ====
Pos	Team	Pld	W	D	L	GF	GA	GD	Pts	Qualification	NAG	POH	JOH	RAT
1	(Japan) Nagoya Grampus	6	5	1	0	14	2	+12	16	Advance to Round of 16	—	3–0	2–1	3–0
2	(South Korea) Pohang Steelers	6	3	2	1	9	5	+4	11	Advance to Round of 16	1–1	—	4–1	2–0
3	(Malaysia) Johor Darul Ta'zim	6	1	1	4	3	9	−6	4		0–1	0–2	—	0–0
4	(Thailand) Ratchaburi Mitr Phol (H)	6	0	2	4	0	10	−10	2		0–4	0–0	0–1	—

Source: AFC
(H) Hosts

Win Draw Loss

==== Group stage ====
22 June 2021 Matchday 1	Johor Darul Ta'zim (Malaysia)	0–1	(Japan) Nagoya Grampus	Bangkok, Thailand
21:00 UTC+7	Safawi Rasid (yellow card) 17'; Maurício (yellow card) 44'; Leandro Velázquez (yellow card) 61'; Bergson (yellow card) 64'; La'Vere Corbin-Ong (yellow card) 70'	Report	Abe 60'; Inagaki (yellow card) 29'; Yonemoto (yellow card) 40'; Yamasaki (yellow card) 66'	Stadium: Rajamangala Stadium; Referee: Mohammed Abdulla Hassan Mohamed (United Arab Emirates); Man of the Match: (Japan) Hiroyuki Abe

25 June 2021 Matchday 2	Ratchaburi Mitr Phol (Thailand)	0–1	(Malaysia) Johor Darul Ta'zim	Bangkok, Thailand
21:00 UTC+7	Pawee (yellow card) 28'	Report	Leandro Velázquez 47'; Azrif Nasrulhaq (yellow card) 41'; Farizal Marlias (yellow card) 43'; Arif Aiman (yellow card) 65'; Natxo Insa (yellow card) 89'	Stadium: Rajamangala Stadium; Referee: Alireza Faghani (Iran); Man of the Match: (Argentina) Leandro Velázquez

28 June 2021 Matchday 3	Pohang Steelers (South Korea)	4–1	(Malaysia) Johor Darul Ta'zim	Bangkok, Thailand
21:00 UTC+7	Borys Tashchy 27' (pen.); Kang Sang-Woo 35' (pen.); Kwon Gi-pyo 82'; Lim Sang-hyub 90+1' (pen.) (yellow card) 45+3'	Report	Velázquez 17'; Shane Lowry (yellow card) 3'; Azrif Nasrulhaq (yellow card) 19'; Maurício (yellow card) 42'; Afiq Fazail (yellow card) 38'; Matthew Davies (yellow card) 79'	Stadium: Rajamangala Stadium; Referee: Shaun Evans (Australia); Man of the Match: (South Korea) Kang Sang-Woo

1 July 2021 Matchday 4	Johor Darul Ta'zim (Malaysia)	0–2	(South Korea) Pohang Steelers	Bangkok, Thailand
	Shane Lowry (yellow card) 7'; Afiq Fazail (yellow card) 34'; Mohamadou Sumareh (yellow card) 84'	Report	Lee Seung-mo 33'; Kang Sang-woo 37'; Go Young-joon (yellow card) 74'; Kwon Gi-pyo (yellow card) 83'	Stadium: Rajamangala Stadium; Referee: Ma Ning (China); Man of the Match: (South Korea) Kang Sang-Woo

4 July 2021 Matchday 5	Nagoya Grampus (Japan)	2–1	(Malaysia) Johor Darul Ta'zim	Bangkok, Thailand
	Mateus 4' (pen.); Hiroyuki Abe 28' (yellow card) 52'; Yonemoto (yellow card) 35'; Kazuya Miyahara (yellow card) 38'	Report	Ramadhan Saifullah 42'; Hazwan Bakri (yellow card) 12'; Syafiq Ahmad (yellow card) 77'; Maurício (yellow card) 79'	Stadium: Rajamangala Stadium; Referee: Alireza Faghani (Iran); Man of the Match: (Australia) Mitchell Langerak

7 July 2021 Matchday 6	Johor Darul Ta'zim (Malaysia)	0–0	(Thailand) Ratchaburi Mitr Phol	Bangkok, Thailand
	Leandro Velázquez (yellow card) 45+2'; Shane Lowry (yellow card) 84'; Mohamadou Sumareh (yellow card) 90'	Report	Pathomchai Sueasakul (yellow card) 52'	Stadium: Rajamangala Stadium; Referee: Mohanad Qasim (Iraq); Man of the Match: (Thailand) Pawee Tanthatemee

== Club statistics ==
Correct as of match played on 28 November 2021

=== Appearances ===
No.	Pos.	Player	Malaysia Super League		FA Cup		Malaysia Cup		ACL / AFC Cup		Total	
No.	Pos.	Player	Apps.	Goals	Apps.	Goals	Apps.	Goals	Apps.	Goals	Apps.	Goals
1	GK	(Malaysia) Farizal Marlias	21	0	0	0	8	0	5	0	34	0
2	DF	(Malaysia) (Australia) Matthew Davies	14+1	1	0	0	9	0	4+1	0	29	1
3	DF	(Malaysia) Adam Nor Azlin	11+4	1	0	0	2	0	1+1	0	19	1
4	MF	(Malaysia) Afiq Fazail	14+3	0	0	0	6+3	0	3+1	0	30	0
5	MF	(Malaysia) Syamer Kutty Abba	4+10	1	0	0	0+1	0	1+3	0	19	1
7	DF	(Malaysia) Aidil Zafuan	8+1	0	0	0	0	0	1	0	10	0
8	MF	(Malaysia) Safiq Rahim	6+7	0	0	0	2+5	0	4+2	0	26	0
9	FW	(Brazil) Bergson	19+1	23	0	0	7	7	5	0	32	30
10	MF	(Argentina) Leandro Velazquez	16	4	0	0	7	2	5	2	28	8
11	FW	(Syria) (Argentina) Gonzalo Cabrera	16	5	0	0	7	3	0	0	23	8
12	DF	(Malaysia) S. Kunanlan	8	0	0	0	3+2	0	2+2	0	17	0
13	MF	(Malaysia) (The Gambia) Mohamadou Sumareh	0+12	3	0	0	0+8	0	0+3	0	23	3
14	DF	(Australia) (Republic of Ireland) Shane Lowry	7	1	0	0	8	0	5	0	20	1
15	DF	(Malaysia) Feroz Baharudin	0	0	0	0	1	0	0	0	1	0
16	MF	(Malaysia) Danial Amier Norhisham	0+2	0	0	0	1+2	0	0+1	0	6	0
17	FW	(Malaysia) Ramadhan Saifullah	1+8	0	0	0	0	0	2+4	1	15	1
18	FW	(Malaysia) Hazwan Bakri	0+3	0	0	0	2+1	1	1	0	7	1
19	FW	(Malaysia) Akhyar Rashid	1+6	1	0	0	0+5	0	2+2	0	16	1
20	DF	(Malaysia) Azrif Nasrulhaq	4	0	0	0	1	0	3+2	0	10	0
21	MF	(Malaysia) Nazmi Faiz	4+5	1	0	0	4+3	0	1+3	0	20	1
22	DF	(Malaysia) (Canada) Corbin-Ong	18+1	0	0	0	8+2	0	3	0	32	0
24	GK	(Malaysia) Izham Tarmizi	0	0	0	0	0	0	0	0	0	0
26	GK	(Malaysia) Haziq Nadzli	1	0	0	0	3	0	1	0	5	0
27	DF	(Malaysia) Fadhli Shas	0	0	0	0	0	0	0	0	0	0
28	FW	(Malaysia) Syafiq Ahmad	1+2	0	0	0	1+1	1	0+1	0	6	1
29	FW	(Malaysia) Safawi Rasid	11+6	3	0	0	5+4	1	2+1	0	29	4
30	MF	(Malaysia) (Spain) Natxo Insa	19	1	0	0	10	0	5	0	34	1
31	FW	(Malaysia) (Brazil) Guilherme de Paula	0+2	0	0	0	2	1	0+2	0	6	1
32	DF	(Malaysia) Shahrul Saad	0	0	0	0	2+1	1	0	0	3	1
33	DF	(Brazil) Maurício Nascimento	18	0	0	0	9	1	5	0	32	1
42	FW	(Malaysia) Arif Aiman Hanapi	14+7	2	0	0	10	1	5	0	36	3
71	MF	(Indonesia) Syahrian Abimanyu	0+2	0	0	0	1	0	0	0	3	0
99	FW	(Spain) Fernando Rodríguez	3+1	1	0	0	0	0	0	0	4	1
Players who have played this season but had left the club or on loan to other club
6	DF	(Malaysia) Syazwan Andik	0	0	0	0	0	0	0	0	0	0
14	MF	(Singapore) Hariss Harun	3+7	1	0	0	0	0	0	0	10	1

== Johor Darul Ta'zim II ==
=== Malaysia Premier League ===
==== Table ====
Pos	Team	Pld	W	D	L	GF	GA	GD	Pts	Qualification or relegation
2	Sarawak United (P)	20	11	5	4	37	14	+23	38	Promotion to Super League and Qualification for the Malaysia Cup group stage
3	Terengganu II (Note: Johor Darul Ta'zim II, Perak II, Selangor II and Terengganu II cannot be promoted from Malaysia Premier League and play in Malaysia Cup as Johor Darul Ta'zim F.C., Perak FA, Selangor F.C. and Terengganu FC (their parent clubs) remain in Malaysia Super League and play in Malaysia Cup. Should the team be relegated to Malaysia Premier League or will not play in Malaysia Cup, Johor Darul Ta'zim II, Perak II, Selangor II and Terengganu II will have to drop to Malaysia M3 League or will play in Malaysia Cup.)	20	9	8	3	37	18	+19	35	
4	Johor Darul Ta'zim II	20	9	7	4	38	20	+18	34	
5	Kuching City	20	7	6	7	22	22	0	27	Qualification for the Malaysia Cup group stage
6	Kelantan	20	8	3	9	23	28	−5	27	Qualification for the Malaysia Cup group stage

Source: MFL
Rules for classification: 1) Points; 2) Goal difference; 3) Number of goals scored.
(P) Promoted

==== Malaysia Premier League fixtures and results ====
Win Draw Loss

6 March 2021 1	Negeri Sembilan FC	2–1	Johor Darul Ta'zim II	Negeri Sembilan
	Zaquan Adha 24' (pen.); Alain Akono 52' (pen.)		Rafiekri Rosman 45'	Stadium: Tuanku Abdul Rahman Stadium

13 March 2021 2	Johor Darul Ta'zim II	3–1	Kuching City F.C.	Johor
	Nicolás Fernández 49'; Feroz Baharudin 52' 78'		Hudson Jesus 22'	Stadium: Larkin Stadium

16 March 2021 3	Kelantan United F.C.	0-0	Johor Darul Ta'zim II	Kelantan
				Stadium: Sultan Muhammad IV Stadium

20 March 2021 4	Johor Darul Ta'zim II	3–2	Perak F.C. II	Johor
	Fernando Rodríguez 16'; Feroz Baharudin 62'; Luis Cabrera 68'		Adib Raop 6' (pen.); Farid Khazali 38'	Stadium: Larkin Stadium

4 April 2021 5	FAM-MSN Project	0-5	Johor Darul Ta'zim II	Selangor
			Fernando Rodríguez 32' 57' 59'; Nicolás Fernández 33'; Firdaus Ramli 45'	Stadium: UiTM Stadium

7 April 2021 6	Johor Darul Ta'zim II	1-0	PDRM F.C.	Johor
	Fernando Rodríguez 6'			Stadium: Larkin Stadium

11 April 2021 7	Johor Darul Ta'zim II	0-0	Selangor F.C. II	Johor
				Stadium: Larkin Stadium

17 April 2021 8	Terengganu F.C. II	4-3	Johor Darul Ta'zim II	Terengganu
	Jordan Mintah 41' 90'; Argzim Redžović 52'; Masaki Watanabe 83'		Nicolás Fernández 22'; Fernando Rodríguez 45' 69'	Stadium: Sultan Ismail Nasiruddin Shah Stadium

23 April 2021 9	Johor Darul Ta'zim II	1-1	Kelantan F.C.	Johor
	Fernando Rodríguez 60'		Nurshamil Abd Ghani 71'	Stadium: Larkin Stadium

1 May 2021 10	Sarawak United F.C.	1-0	Johor Darul Ta'zim II	Terengganu
	Norshahrul Idlan 85'			Stadium: Sultan Ismail Nasiruddin Shah Stadium

7 May 2021 11	Johor Darul Ta'zim II	0-0	Negeri Sembilan FC	Johor
				Stadium: Larkin Stadium

1 August 2021 12	Johor Darul Ta'zim II	3-0	Kelantan United F.C.	Kelantan
	Fernando Rodríguez 15' 60'; Alif Abdul Mutalib 85'			Stadium: Sultan Muhammad IV Stadium

4 August 2021 13	Perak F.C. II	0–2	Johor Darul Ta'zim II	Perak
	Irfan Fazail 70'; K.Daryl Sham 90'			Stadium: Perak Stadium

7 August 2021 14	Johor Darul Ta'zim II	5-1	FAM-MSN Project	Johor
	K.Daryl Sham 14'; Fernando Rodríguez 19' 89'; Chia Ruo Han 35'; Kei Hirose 59'		Azhad Arman 80'	Stadium: Larkin Stadium

11 August 2021 15	PDRM F.C.	2-2	Johor Darul Ta'zim II	Kuala Lumpur
	Nabil Latpi 35'; Bruno Suzuki 51'	Report	Gabriel Nistelrooy 30' 69'	Stadium: KLFA Stadium

20 August 2021 16	Selangor F.C. II	1-1	Johor Darul Ta'zim II	Selangor
	Alexander Ameyaw 21'	Report	Fernando Rodríguez 45'	Stadium: UiTM Stadium

25 August 2021 17	Kuching City F.C.	2–1	Johor Darul Ta'zim II	Johor
	Irwan Syazmin 59'; Amir Amri Salleh 82'	Report	Fernando Rodríguez 18'	Stadium: Pasir Gudang Corporation Stadium

29 August 2021 18	Johor Darul Ta'zim II	3-2	Terengganu F.C. II	Johor
	Rafiefikri Rosman 53'; Fernando Rodríguez 60'; Kei Hirose 78'	Report	Jordan Mintah 43'; Masaki Watanabe 90'	Stadium: Larkin Stadium

11 September 2021 19	Kelantan F.C.	0-3	Johor Darul Ta'zim II	Kelantan
	Fadhli Shas 11'; Fernando Rodríguez 14'; Kei Hirose 56'	Report	Nurshamil Abd Ghani 71'	Stadium: Sultan Muhammad IV Stadium

21 September 2021 20	Johor Darul Ta'zim II	1–1	Sarawak United F.C.	Johor
	Stuart John Wilkin 84'	Report	Uche Agba 4'	Stadium: Larkin Stadium

=== Squad statistics ===
As of match played 20 August 2021

No.	Pos	Nat	Player	Total		Premier League	
No.	Pos	Nat	Player	Apps	Goals	Apps	Goals
1	GK	(Malaysia) MAS	Shaheeswaran Thavakumar	6	0	6	0
2	DF	(Malaysia) MAS	Nafizuddin Fauzi	14	0	13+1	0
3	DF	(Malaysia) MAS	Firdaus Ramli	12	1	11+1	1
4	DF	(Malaysia) MAS	Adib Zainudin	12	0	8+4	0
6	DF	(Malaysia) MAS	Hafiy Haikal	7	0	3+4	0
7	MF	(Malaysia) MAS	Irfan Fazail	9	1	3+6	1
8	MF	(Japan) JPN	Kei Hirose	16	0	14+2	0
9	FW	(Spain) ESP	Fernando Rodríguez	12	13	12	13
10	MF	(Argentina) ARG	Nico Fernández	8	3	7+1	3
11	MF	(Malaysia) MAS	Khairullah Halim	2	0	0+2	0
13	MF	(Malaysia) MAS	Aysar Hadi	13	0	12+1	0
14	MF	(Malaysia) MAS	Chia Ruo Han	7	1	4+3	1
15	MF	(Malaysia) MAS	Gary Steven Robbat	9	1	5+4	1
16	MF	(Malaysia) MAS	Umar Hakeem	8	0	3+5	0
17	MF	(Malaysia) MAS	Alif Mutalib	7	1	4+3	1
18	FW	(Malaysia) MAS	Awang Faiz Hazziq	3	0	0+3	0
19	FW	(Malaysia) MAS	Gabriel Nistelrooy	7	2	2+5	2
21	DF	(Malaysia) MAS	Aiman Danish	2	0	0+2	0
22	MF	(Malaysia) MAS	Stuart Wilkin	12	0	10+2	0
23	FW	(Malaysia) MAS	Amirul Husaini	5	0	1+4	0
26	MF	(Argentina) ARG	Luis Cabrera	6	1	3+3	1
29	MF	(Malaysia) MAS	Rafiefikri Rosman	9	1	7+2	1
34	DF	(Malaysia) MAS	Daniel Rahman	1	0	0+1	0
35	MF	(Malaysia) MAS	Daryl Sham	5	2	5	2
42	GK	(Malaysia) MAS	Izham Tarmizi	4	0	4	0
51	DF	(Malaysia) MAS	Feroz Baharudin	5	3	5	3
60	DF	(Malaysia) MAS	Syazwan Andik	12	0	12	0
61	MF	(Malaysia) MAS	Danial Amier Norhisham	3	0	3	0
62	GK	(Malaysia) MAS	Haziq Nadzli	6	0	6	0
72	DF	(Malaysia) MAS	Fadhli Shas	6	0	6	0
81	FW	(Malaysia) MAS	Hazwan Bakri	2	0	2	0
82	MF	(Malaysia) MAS	Syafiq Ahmad	3	0	3	0
91	FW	(Malaysia) MAS	Akhyar Rashid	1	0	1	0
