= 2022 Johor Darul Ta'zim F.C. season =

Johor Darul Ta'zim
2022 season
- Owner: Tunku Ismail Idris
- Chairman: Tunku Tun Aminah Sultan Ibrahim
- Head Coach: Benjamin Mora (until 28 July); Héctor Bidoglio (from 28 July)
- Stadium: Sultan Ibrahim Stadium
- Super League: 1st
- Charity Shield: Winners
- FA Cup: Winners
- Malaysia Cup: Winners
- Champions League: Round of 16
- Top goalscorer: League: Bérgson (29); All: Bérgson (46)
- Biggest win: 10–0 vs BRM (H), 12 March 2022, FA Cup
- Biggest defeat: 0–5 vs Kawasaki Frontale (A), 24 April 2022, Champions League; 0–5 vs Urawa Red Diamonds (A), 19 August 2022, Champions League
Home colours	Away colours

The 2022 season was Johor Darul Ta'zim Football Club's 49th season in club history and 8th season in the Malaysia Super League after rebranding their name from Johor FC.

== Squad ==
=== First-team squad ===
As of 21 Oct 2023

Squad No.	Name	Nationality	Date of birth (age)	Previous club	Contract since	Contract end
Goalkeepers
1	Farizal Marlias	(Malaysia)	29 June 1986 (age 40)	(Malaysia) Selangor	2015	2022
24	Izham Tarmizi	(Malaysia)	24 April 1991 (age 35)	(Malaysia) Harimau Muda A	2014	2022
26	Haziq Nadzli	(Malaysia)	6 January 1998 (age 28)	(Malaysia) PDRM FC	2017	2022
Defenders
2	Matthew Davies	(Malaysia) (Australia)	7 February 1995 (age 31)	(Malaysia) Pahang	2020	2022
3	Adam Nor Azlin	(Malaysia)	5 January 1996 (age 30)	(Malaysia) Selangor	2018	
7	Aidil Zafuan	(Malaysia)	3 August 1987 (age 39)	(Malaysia) ATM FA	2013	
12	S. Kunanlan	(Malaysia)	15 September 1986 (age 40)	(Malaysia) Selangor	2015	2022
14	Shane Lowry	(Australia) (Republic of Ireland)	12 June 1989 (age 37)	(Qatar) Al Ahli	2021	2023
15	Feroz Baharudin	(Malaysia)	2 April 2000 (age 26)	(Malaysia) Johor Darul Ta'zim II	2021	
20	Azrif Nasrulhaq	(Malaysia)	27 May 1991 (age 35)	(Malaysia) Selangor	2016	2022
22	La'Vere Corbin-Ong	(Malaysia) (Canada)	21 April 1991 (age 35)	(Netherlands) Go Ahead Eagles	2018	
23	Carli de Murga	(Philippines) (Spain)	30 November 1988 (age 37)	(Malaysia) Terengganu I	2022	
32	Shahrul Saad	(Malaysia)	8 July 1993 (age 33)	(Malaysia) Perak	2021	2022
33	Daniel Ting	(Malaysia) (England)	1 December 1992 (age 33)	(Malaysia) Kuala Lumpur City	2022	2022
55	Jordi Amat	(Indonesia) (Spain)	21 March 1992 (age 34)	(Belgium) Eupen	2022	2022
91	Syahmi Safari	(Malaysia)	5 February 1998 (age 28)	(Malaysia) Selangor	2022	
Midfielders
4	Afiq Fazail	(Malaysia)	29 September 1994 (age 32)	(Malaysia) Harimau Muda B	2015	
5	Syamer Kutty Abba	(Malaysia)	1 October 1997 (age 29)	(Portugal) Vilaverdense	2018	2022
6	Nathaniel Shio Hong Wan	(Malaysia) (England)	17 August 2000 (age 26)	(England) Wolves U23	2021	2022
8	Safiq Rahim	(Malaysia)	5 July 1987 (age 39)	(Malaysia) Melaka United	2021	
10	Leandro Velázquez	(Argentina)	10 May 1989 (age 37)	(Colombia) Rionegro Águilas	2019	
13	Mohamadou Sumareh	(Malaysia) (The Gambia)	20 September 1994 (age 32)	(Thailand) Police Tero	2021	
16	Danial Amier Norhisham	(Malaysia)	27 March 1997 (age 29)	(Malaysia) FELDA United	2021	2022
21	Nazmi Faiz	(Malaysia)	16 August 1994 (age 32)	(Malaysia) Johor Darul Ta'zim II	2017	
30	Natxo Insa	(Malaysia) (Spain)	9 June 1986 (age 40)	(Spain) Levante UD	2017	2022
38	Junior Eldstål	(Malaysia) (England)	16 September 1991 (age 35)	(Thailand) Chonburi	2022	
40	Adam Farhan	(Malaysia)	4 March 2004 (age 22)	(Malaysia) Johor Darul Ta'zim III	2021	
41	Chia Rou Han	(Malaysia)	1 September 2001 (age 25)	(Malaysia) Johor Darul Ta'zim III	2021	
81	Daryl Sham	(Malaysia) (Philippines)	30 November 2002 (age 23)	(Malaysia) Johor Darul Ta'zim II	2022	
Strikers
9	Bergson da Silva	(Brazil)	9 February 1991 (age 35)	(Brazil) Fortaleza	2021	2022
11	Safawi Rasid	(Malaysia)	5 March 1997 (age 29)	(Portugal) Portimonense	2017	2022
17	Ramadhan Saifullah	(Malaysia)	9 December 2000 (age 25)	(Malaysia) Johor Darul Ta'zim III	2020	
18	Hazwan Bakri	(Malaysia)	19 June 1991 (age 35)	(Malaysia) Selangor	2017	2022
19	Akhyar Rashid	(Malaysia)	1 May 1999 (age 27)	(Malaysia) Kedah	2019	2023
25	Moussa Sidibe	(Mali) (Spain)	21 November 1994 (age 31)	(Spain) Costa Brava	2022	2022
28	Syafiq Ahmad	(Malaysia)	28 June 1995 (age 31)	(Malaysia) Kedah	2018	
31	Guilherme de Paula	(Malaysia) (Brazil)	11 September 1986 (age 40)	(Malaysia) Perak	2021	2022
42	Arif Aiman Hanapi	(Malaysia)	4 May 2002 (age 24)	(Malaysia) Johor Darul Ta'zim III	2020	
45	Fernando Forestieri	(Argentina) (Italy)	15 January 1990 (age 36)	(Italy) Udinese	2022	2022
92	Lévy Madinda	(Gabon)	22 June 1992 (age 34)	(Malaysia) Sabah	2022	2022
On loan
6	Syazwan Andik	(Malaysia)	4 August 1996 (age 30)	(Malaysia) Melaka United	2019	
	Fadhli Shas	(Malaysia)	21 January 1991 (age 35)	(Malaysia) Melaka United	2014	2022
88	Liridon Krasniqi	(Malaysia)	1 January 1992 (age 34)	(India) Odisha	2020	2022
69	Jonathan Herrera	(Argentina)	16 September 1991 (age 35)	(Argentina) Patronato	2021	2023
Left during the season
33	Maurício	(Brazil)	20 September 1988 (age 38)	(Italy) S.S. Lazio	2019	2022
27	Bienvenido Marañón	(Philippines) (Spain)	15 May 1986 (age 40)	(Philippines) United City	2022	
99	Fernando Rodríguez	(Spain)	11 May 1987 (age 39)	(Malaysia) Johor Darul Ta'zim II	2020	

=== Johor Darul Ta'zim II F.C. ===
As of 21 Oct 2020.

Squad No.	Name	Nationality	Date of birth (age)	Previous club	Contract since	Contract end
Goalkeepers
1	T. Shaheeswaran	(Malaysia)	21 October 1999 (age 27)	(Malaysia) Johor Darul Ta'zim III F.C.	2019	
25	Hafiz Azizi	(Malaysia)	5 August 2001 (age 25)	(Malaysia) Johor Darul Ta'zim III F.C.	2019	
27	Rozaimi Rahamat	(Malaysia)	14 May 1996 (age 30)	(Malaysia) Johor Darul Ta'zim III F.C.	2019	
42	Izham Tarmizi	(Malaysia)	24 April 1991 (age 35)	(Malaysia) Johor Darul Ta'zim F.C.	2014	2021
Defenders
2	Nafizuddin Fauzi	(Malaysia)	16 February 2001 (age 25)	(Malaysia) Johor Darul Ta'zim III F.C.	2021	
3	Firdaus Khairul Asyraff Ramli	(Malaysia)	10 March 2002 (age 24)	(Malaysia) Johor Darul Ta'zim III F.C.	2021	
6	Hafiy Haikal	(Malaysia)	24 April 1998 (age 28)	(Malaysia) Johor Darul Ta'zim III F.C.	2020	
16	Umar Hakeem	(Malaysia)	26 August 2002 (age 24)	(Malaysia) Johor Darul Ta'zim III F.C.	2020	
17	Alif Mutalib	(Malaysia)	16 January 2002 (age 24)	(Malaysia) Johor Darul Ta'zim III F.C.	2020	
18	Daryl Sham	(Malaysia)	30 November 2002 (age 23)	(Malaysia) Johor Darul Ta'zim III F.C.	2022	
33	Adam Nor Azlin	(Malaysia)	5 January 1996 (age 30)	(Malaysia) Johor Darul Ta'zim F.C.	2018	
40	Azrif Nasrulhaq	(Malaysia)	27 May 1991 (age 35)	(Malaysia) Johor Darul Ta'zim F.C.	2016	2021
44	Daniel Ting	(Malaysia) (England)	1 December 1992 (age 33)	(Malaysia) Kuala Lumpur City	2022	2022
51	Feroz Baharudin	(Malaysia)	2 April 2000 (age 26)	(Malaysia) Johor Darul Ta'zim F.C.	2021	
	Firdaus Kaironnisam	(Malaysia)	10 December 2002 (age 23)	(Malaysia) Johor Darul Ta'zim III F.C.	2022	
Midfielders
5	Ali Imran	(Malaysia)	30 May 2002 (age 24)	(Malaysia) Johor Darul Ta'zim III F.C.	2021	
8	Rafiefikri Rosman	(Malaysia)	13 June 2002 (age 24)	(Malaysia) Johor Darul Ta'zim III F.C.	2020	
11	Chia Rou Han	(Malaysia)	1 September 2001 (age 25)	(Malaysia) Johor Darul Ta'zim III F.C.	2021	
13	Aysar Hadi	(Malaysia)	4 September 2003 (age 23)	(Malaysia) Johor Darul Ta'zim III F.C.	2021	
20	Danial Haqim	(Malaysia)	29 August 1998 (age 28)	(Malaysia) Kelantan FA	2020	
21	Danish Azli	(Malaysia)	7 March 2003 (age 23)	(Malaysia) Johor Darul Ta'zim III F.C.	2021	
26	Amirul Husaini Zamri	(Malaysia)	14 October 2000 (age 26)	(Malaysia) Johor Darul Ta'zim III F.C.	2021	
50	Syamer Kutty Abba	(Malaysia)	1 October 1997 (age 29)	(Portugal) Vilaverdense	2018	2022
52	Moussa Sidibe	(Mali) (Spain)	21 November 1994 (age 31)	(Malaysia) Johor Darul Ta'zim F.C.	2022	2022
61	Danial Amier Norhisham	(Malaysia)	27 March 1997 (age 29)	(Malaysia) Johor Darul Ta'zim F.C.	2021	2022
Forwards
10	Lévy Madinda	(Gabon)	22 June 1992 (age 34)	(Malaysia) Sabah	2022	2022
12	Awang Muhammad Faiz Hazziq	(Malaysia)	6 March 1999 (age 27)	(Malaysia) Johor Darul Ta'zim III F.C.	2020	
19	Gabriel Nistelrooy	(Malaysia)	25 April 2000 (age 26)	(Malaysia) Johor Darul Ta'zim III F.C.	2021	
77	Guilherme de Paula	(Malaysia) (Brazil)	11 September 1986 (age 40)	(Malaysia) Perak	2021	2022
81	Hazwan Bakri	(Malaysia)	19 June 1991 (age 35)	(Malaysia) Johor Darul Ta'zim F.C.	2017	2021
	Leandro Velázquez	(Argentina)	10 May 1989 (age 37)	(Malaysia) Johor Darul Ta'zim F.C.	2022	
Players who are loan to other clubs
7	Irfan Fazail	(Malaysia)	12 April 1991 (age 35)	(Malaysia) Johor Darul Ta'zim F.C.	2016	
22	Stuart Wilkin	(Malaysia) (England)	12 March 1999 (age 27)	(United States) Missouri State University	2021	
	Che Rashid	(Malaysia)	17 December 1994 (age 31)	(Malaysia) Melaka United	2019	
Players who had left other clubs during the season
9	Fernando Rodríguez	(Spain)	11 May 1987 (age 39)	(Malaysia) Kedah Darul Aman F.C.	2021	2022
72	Bienvenido Marañón	(Philippines) (Spain)	15 May 1986 (age 40)	(Malaysia) Johor Darul Ta'zim F.C.	2022	

== Transfers and contracts ==
=== In ===
Preseason

Position	Player	Transferred from	Ref
DF	(Malaysia) Syahmi Safari	(Malaysia) Selangor	Free
DF	(Philippines) (Spain) Carli de Murga	(Malaysia) Terengganu	Free
MF	(Mali) Moussa Sidibé	(Spain) SD Ponferradina	Undisclosed
FW	(Argentina) Fernando Forestieri	(Italy) Udinese	Free
FW	(Philippines) (Spain) Bienvenido Marañón	(Philippines) United City	Free

Note 1: Endrick will stay with Penang and return in 2023.

Note 2: Carli de Murga was allocated to JDT 2 for the 2022 season.

Note 3: Bienvenido Marañón was released in July 2022.

Mid-season

Position	Player	Transferred from	Ref
DF	(Indonesia) (Spain) Jordi Amat	(Belgium) Eupen	Free
DF	(Malaysia) (England) Daniel Ting	(Malaysia) Kuala Lumpur City	Free
MF	(Malaysia) (England) Junior Eldstål	(Thailand) Chonburi	Free
FW	(Gabon) Lévy Madinda	(Malaysia) Sabah	Free
MF	(Malaysia) (England) Kobe Jae Chong	(England) Peterborough United U23	Free

Note 1: Kobe JC will be loaned to Pahang FC till the end of season for exchange for the transfer of Azam Aziz.

=== Loan in / return ===
Preseason

Position	Player	Transferred from	Ref
DF	(Malaysia) Hasbullah Abu Bakar	(Malaysia) Melaka United	Loan Return
DF	(Malaysia) Fazly Mazlan	(Malaysia) Sri Pahang	Loan Return
DF	(Malaysia) Che Rashid	(Malaysia) Melaka United	Loan Return
DF	(Malaysia) Syazwan Andik	(Malaysia) Johor Darul Ta'zim II F.C.	Loan Return
DF	(Malaysia) Feroz Baharudin	(Malaysia) Johor Darul Ta'zim II F.C.	Loan Return
MF	(Malaysia) Gary Steven Robbat	(Malaysia) Melaka United	Loan Return
FW	(Malaysia) S.Kumaahran	(Malaysia) Melaka United	Loan Return
FW	(Argentina) Jonathan Herrera	(Argentina) Club Atlético Independiente	Loan Return

Note 1: S.Kumaahran returned from loan before moving to Petaling Jaya City.

Note 2: Che Rashid returned from loan and moved to Negeri Sembilan FC on loan for the 2022 season.

Note 3: Fazly Mazlan returned from loan and moved to Selangor for the 2022 season.

Note 4: Gary Steven Robbat returned to Melaka United on loan for another season.

Note 5: Jonathan Herrera returned to the club after Independiente refused to pick up the transfer option. He moved to Club Atlético Patronato on loan for 2022 season.

Note 6: Hasbullah Abu Bakar returned from loan before returning to (Malaysia) Melaka United .

Note 7: Gary Steven Robbat moved to Sabah FC for the new season on permanent basis after his loan in 2021 ended.

Mid-season

Position	Player	Transferred from	Ref
MF	(Malaysia) Syafiq Ahmad	(Malaysia) Kedah Darul Aman	Loan Return

=== Out ===
Preseason

Position	Player	Transferred To	Ref
DF	(Malaysia) Hasbullah Abu Bakar	(Malaysia) Melaka United	
DF	(Malaysia) Fazly Mazlan	(Malaysia) Selangor	2 years contract signed 2021 till 2023
DF	(Malaysia) Adib Zainudin	(Malaysia) Terengganu FC	2 years contract signed 2021 till 2023
DF	(Malaysia) Hariz Kamaruddin	(Malaysia) Negeri Sembilan FC	Free
MF	(Japan) Kei Hirose	(Indonesia) Borneo	Free
MF	(Argentina) Nico Fernández		Free
MF	(Indonesia) Syahrian Abimanyu	(Indonesia) Persija Jakarta	Undisclosed
FW	(Iraq) (Argentina) Gonzalo Cabrera		Free
FW	(Malaysia) S.Kumaahran	(Malaysia) Petaling Jaya City	Undisclosed
MF	(Malaysia) Gary Steven Robbat	(Malaysia) Sabah	Undisclosed

Mid-season

Position	Player	Transferred To	Ref
DF	(Brazil) Maurício	(Brazil) Náutico (B2)	Free
FW	(Philippines) (Spain) Bienvenido Marañón	(Spain) Villarrubia CF (E6)	Free
FW	(Spain) Fernando Rodríguez	(Indonesia) Persis Solo (I1)	Free

=== Loan out ===
Preseason

Position	Player	Transferred To	Ref
DF	(Malaysia) Che Rashid	(Malaysia) Negeri Sembilan FC	Season loan
DF	(Malaysia) Fadhli Shas	(Malaysia) Melaka United	Season loan
DF	(Malaysia) Syazwan Andik	(Malaysia) Melaka United	Season loan
MF	(Malaysia) Gary Steven Robbat	(Malaysia) Melaka United	Season Loan
MF	(Malaysia) (Kosovo) Liridon Krasniqi	(India) Odisha FC	Season loan till March 2022
MF	(Malaysia) Irfan Fazail	(Malaysia) Sabah	Season loan
MF	(Malaysia) Stuart Wilkin	(Malaysia) Sabah	Season loan
MF	(Brazil) Endrick	(Malaysia) Penang	Season loan
MF	(Malaysia) Syafiq Ahmad	(Malaysia) Kedah Darul Aman	Season Loan
FW	(Argentina) Jonathan Herrera	(Argentina) Club Atlético Patronato	Season Loan

Mid-season

Position	Player	Transferred To	Ref
MF	(Malaysia) (Kosovo) Liridon Krasniqi	(Thailand) Khon Kaen United	Season loan till May 2023

=== Retained ===
Position	Player	Ref
GK	(Malaysia) Farizal Marlias	
DF	(Malaysia) (Australia) Matthew Davies	3 years contract signed in 2020 till 2022
DF	(Malaysia) Azrif Nasrulhaq	
DF	(Malaysia) Feroz Baharudin	
DF	(Malaysia) Adam Nor Azlin	
DF	(Malaysia) Aidil Zafuan	
DF	(Malaysia) S. Kunanlan	
DF	(Australia) (Republic of Ireland) Shane Lowry	2 years contract signed in 2021 till 2023
DF	(Malaysia) (Canada) La'Vere Corbin-Ong	
DF	(Brazil) Maurício	
MF	(Malaysia) (Spain) Natxo Insa	1 years contract signed in Oct 2021 till 2022
MF	(Malaysia) Ramadhan Saifullah	
MF	(Malaysia) Nazmi Faiz	
MF	(Malaysia) Gary Steven Robbat	
MF	(Malaysia) Danial Amier Norhisham	2 years contract signed in Oct 2020 till 2022
MF	(Argentina) Leandro Velázquez	
FW	(Brazil) Bergson	
FW	(Malaysia) Hazwan Bakri	
FW	(Malaysia) Akhyar Rashid	

=== Rumors ===
Position	Player	Transferred from	Ref
MF	(Italy) (Argentina) Cristian Battocchio	(Mexico) UNAM	Free

== Friendly matches ==
Win Draw Loss

=== Tour of UAE ===
25 January 2022 1	Žilina (Slovakia)	2–2	(Malaysia) Johor Darul Ta'zim	Dubai, United Arab Emirates
	61'; Samuel Javorcek 88'		Bergson da Silva 1'; Moussa Sidibé 63'	Stadium: The Sevens Stadium

27 January 2022 2	Al Ahli (United Arab Emirates)	0–1	(Malaysia) Johor Darul Ta'zim	Dubai, United Arab Emirates
			Moussa Sidibé 60'	Stadium: Rashid Stadium

29 January 2022 3	Riga (Latvia)	1–1	(Malaysia) Johor Darul Ta'zim	Dubai, United Arab Emirates
	La'Vere Corbin-Ong 13' (o.g.)		Fernando Forestieri 23'	Stadium: Jebel Ali Football Centre

2 February 2022 4	(R3) Rodina Moscow (Russia)	2–0	(Malaysia) Johor Darul Ta'zim	Dubai, United Arab Emirates
				Stadium: Jebel Ali Football Centre

5 February 2022 5	Spartak Moscow (Russia)	1–1	(Malaysia) Johor Darul Ta'zim	Dubai, United Arab Emirates
	Aleksandr Sobolev 71'		Bergson da Silva 23' (pen.)	Stadium: Jebel Ali Football Centre

=== Pre-season Friendly ===
19 February 2022 1	Johor Darul Ta'zim (Malaysia)	4–0	(Malaysia) Kuching City	Johor, Malaysia
	Bergson da Silva; Fernando Forestieri			Stadium: Sultan Ibrahim Stadium

=== Mid-season Friendly ===
10 June 2022 1	Johor Darul Ta'zim (Malaysia)	8–0	(Singapore) Hougang United	Johor, Malaysia
	Bergson 22'; Leandro Velázquez 34'; Hazwan Bakri 36'; Ramadhan Saifullah 57' 75'; Fernando Rodríguez 59' 71'; Alif Mutalib 82'			Stadium: Sultan Ibrahim Stadium

11 June 2022 2	Johor Darul Ta'zim II (Malaysia)	1–0	(Singapore) Tampines Rovers	Johor Bahru
	1'			Stadium: Tan Sri Dato' Haji Hassan Yunos Stadium

=== In-season Friendly ===
12 November 2022 1	Johor Darul Ta'zim II (Malaysia)	1–1	(Indonesia) Persis Solo	Johor, Malaysia
				Stadium: Sultan Ibrahim Stadium

28 November 2022 2	Johor Darul Ta'zim (Malaysia)	1-4	(Germany) Borussia Dortmund	Johor, Malaysia
				Stadium: Sultan Ibrahim Stadium

== Competitions ==
=== Overview ===
Competition	First match	Last match	Starting round	Final position	Record							
Competition	First match	Last match	Starting round	Final position	Pld	W	D	L	GF	GA	GD	Win %
Malaysia Super League	4 March 2022	15 October 2022	Matchday 1	Winners	22	17	5	0	61	12	+49	77.27
Malaysia Charity Shield	26 February 2022		Final	Winners	1	1	0	0	3	0	+3	100.00
Malaysia FA Cup	12 March 2022	10 September 2022	Round of 32	Winners	5	5	0	0	24	3	+21	100.00
Malaysia Cup	26 October 2022	26 November 2022	Round of 16	Winners	7	7	0	0	20	2	+18	100.00
AFC Champions League	15 April 2022	19 August 2022	Group stage	Round of 16	7	4	1	2	11	12	−1	57.14
Total					42	34	6	2	119	29	+90	80.95

Last updated: 26 November 2022
Source: Competitions

=== Malaysia Charity Shield ===
26 February 2022 Charity Shield	Johor Darul Ta'zim	3–0	Kuala Lumpur City	Johor
	Nazmi Faiz 26'; Fernando Forestieri 31'; Afiq Fazail 84'	Report		Stadium: Sultan Ibrahim Stadium; Attendance: 15,485; Referee: Muhammad Nazmi Nasaruddin

=== Malaysia Super League ===
==== Table ====
Pos	Team	Pld	W	D	L	GF	GA	GD	Pts	Qualification or relegation
1	Johor Darul Ta'zim	22	17	5	0	61	12	+49	56	Qualification for AFC Champions League group stage
2	Terengganu	22	14	2	6	39	20	+19	44	Qualification for AFC Cup group stage
3	Sabah	22	13	3	6	36	26	+10	42	Qualification for AFC Cup group stage
4	Negeri Sembilan	22	12	5	5	33	26	+7	41	
5	Selangor	22	8	6	8	39	33	+6	30	

Updated to match(es) played on unknown. Source: MFL
Rules for classification: 1) Points; 2) Goal difference; 3) Number of goals scored.

==== Malaysia Super League fixtures and results ====
Win Draw Loss

Update: 16 August 2022

4 March 2022 1	Johor Darul Ta'zim	1–0	Penang	Johor
21:00 UTC+8	Bergson 70'	Report		Stadium: Sultan Ibrahim Stadium; Attendance: 11,253; Referee: Razlan Joffri Ali

9 March 2022 2	Johor Darul Ta'zim	6–0	Sarawak United	Johor
20:15 UTC+8	Fernando Forestieri 15' 85'; Bergson 39' 63'; Carli de Murga 73'; Safawi Rasid 81'	Report		Stadium: Sultan Ibrahim Stadium; Attendance: 8,653; Referee: Zulkarnain Zakaria

6 April 2022 3	Kuala Lumpur City	0–3	Johor Darul Ta'zim	Kuala Lumpur
22:00 UTC+8		Report	Fernando Forestieri 18'; Bergson 82' 90+4'	Stadium: Kuala Lumpur Stadium; Attendance: 2,693; Referee: Razlan Joffri Ali

10 April 2022 4	Johor Darul Ta'zim	2–1	Terengganu	Johor
22:00 UTC+8	Bergson 7' 33'	Report	Kpah Sherman 31'	Stadium: Sultan Ibrahim Stadium; Attendance: 8,371; Referee: Fusser Sallih

24 June 2022 5 (Rescheduled)	Johor Darul Ta'zim	5–1	Selangor	Johor
20:15 UTC+8	Bergson 3', 55'; Fernando Forestieri 24'; Velázquez 35'; Sumareh 90+2'; Arif (yellow card) 10'; Insa (yellow card) 22'; Afiq (yellow card) 29'	Report	Fazly (yellow card) 28'; Ajmal (yellow card) 38'; Safuwan (yellow card) 70'; Hakim 82'	Stadium: Sultan Ibrahim Stadium; Attendance: 30,142; Referee: Zulkarnain Zakaria

2 July 2022 6 (Rescheduled)	Melaka United	1–1	Johor Darul Ta'zim	Malacca
21:00 UTC+8	Justin Baas 39'	Report	Leandro Velázquez 27'	Stadium: Hang Jebat Stadium; Attendance: 14,562; Referee: S. Logeswaran

28 June 2022 7 (Rescheduled)	Johor Darul Ta'zim	4–0	Petaling Jaya City	Johor
21:00 UTC+8	Bergson 23', 65'; Fernando Forestieri 26', 85'	Report		Stadium: Sultan Ibrahim Stadium; Attendance: 10,184; Referee: Razlan Joffri Ali

11 May 2022 8	Negeri Sembilan	0–1	Johor Darul Ta'zim	Paroi
21:00 UTC+8		Report	Fernando Forestieri 90+10'	Stadium: Tuanku Abdul Rahman Stadium; Attendance: 22,224; Referee: Nazmi Nasaruddin

18 May 2022 9	Johor Darul Ta'zim	2–2	Sri Pahang	Johor
20:15 UTC+8	Bergson 17' 88' (pen.)	Report	Saiful Jamaluddin 38'; Manuel Hidalgo 42' (pen.)	Stadium: Sultan Ibrahim Stadium; Attendance: 12,546; Referee: Ahmad Zuhaidi

4 October 2022 10 (Rescheduled)	Kedah Darul Aman	1–3	Johor Darul Ta'zim	Alor Setar
21:00 UTC+8	Rodney Celvin (yellow card) 10'; Ronald Ngah 12'; Kamil Akmal (yellow card) 14'; Akmal Zahir (yellow card) 14'; Shahril Saa'ri (yellow card) 14'	Report	Natxo Insa (yellow card) 14'; Bergson 37' (red card) 45+2'; Velázquez 60' (pen.); Afiq 79'; Leandro Velázquez (yellow card) 14'	Stadium: Darul Aman Stadium; Attendance: 14,954; Referee: Hamdan Bin Awang

15 July 2022 11	Sabah	1–2	Johor Darul Ta'zim	Kota Kinabalu
20:15 UTC+8	Park Tae-soo 19'	Report	Fernando Forestieri 20' 90+6'	Stadium: Likas Stadium; Attendance: 23,523; Referee: Mohd Fusser Bin Mad Sallih

20 July 2022 12	Penang	0–1	Johor Darul Ta'zim	Penang
21:00 UTC+8		Report	Fernando Rodríguez 70'	Stadium: City Stadium; Attendance: 6,252; Referee: Hamdan Bin Awang

27 July 2022 13	Sarawak United	0–4	Johor Darul Ta'zim	Kuching
20:15 UTC+8		Report	Hazwan 13'; Bergson 20'; Syahmi 79'; Fernando Forestieri 89' (pen.)	Stadium: Sarawak Stadium; Attendance: 5,512; Referee: Hamdan Bin Awang

1 August 2022 14	Johor Darul Ta'zim	5–0	Kuala Lumpur City	Johor
20:15 UTC+8	Bergson 7' (pen.) 25'; Leandro Velazquez 54' (pen.); Fernando Forestieri 71'; Safawi Rasid 84'	Report		Stadium: Sultan Ibrahim Stadium; Attendance: 13,252; Referee: Mohd Fusser Bin Mad Sallih

10 August 2022 15	Terengganu FC	1–2	Johor Darul Ta'zim	Terengganu
20:15 UTC+8	Hakimi Abdullah 50'	Report	Bergson 32'; Fernando Forestieri 47'	Stadium: Sultan Ismail Nasiruddin Shah Stadium; Attendance: 13,689; Referee: Mohd Hasrol Bin Mohd Amir

3 September 2022 16 (Rescheduled)	Selangor	1–1	Johor Darul Ta'zim	Petaling Jaya
20:15 UTC+8	Haiqal (yellow card) 51'; Caion 65'; Agyarkwa (yellow card) 69'; Hakim (yellow card) 88'; Ashmawi (yellow card) 90'		Bergson 32' (pen.); Shane (yellow card) 65'; Shahrul (yellow card) 84'; Wan (yellow card) 90+4'	Stadium: MBPJ Stadium; Attendance: 4,104; Referee: Zulkarnain Zakaria

29 August 2022 17 (Rescheduled)	Johor Darul Ta'zim	4–0	Melaka United	Johor
20:15 UTC+8	Fernando Forestieri 13'; Bergson 32', 42', 85'; Leandro Velazquez (yellow card) 38'; Danial Amier (yellow card) 44'; Shane Lowry (yellow card) 81'	Report		Stadium: Sultan Ibrahim Stadium; Attendance: 10,962; Referee: Suhaizi Shukri

15 September 2022 18 (Rescheduled)	Petaling Jaya City	2–2	Johor Darul Ta'zim	Petaling Jaya
21:00 UTC+8	Darren Lok 73'; Mahalli Jasuli (yellow card) 79'; Kogileswaran Raj 90+2'	Report	Fernando Forestieri (yellow card) 17'; Bergson 48' (pen.); Matthew Davies (yellow card) 53'; Akhyar Rashid 86'; Farizal Marlias (yellow card) 89'	Stadium: Petaling Jaya Stadium; Attendance: 1,714; Referee: Ahmad Zuhaidi Dzulkifli

1 October 2022 19 (Rescheduled)	Johor Darul Ta'zim	5–0	Negeri Sembilan	Johor
20:15 UTC+8	Arif Aiman 35', 49'; Leandro Velazquez 38'; Akhyar Rashid (yellow card) 45+3'; Shahrul Saad (yellow card) 77'; Bergson 61', 88'	Report	Omid Nazari (yellow card) 45'; Namathevan (yellow card) 86'	Stadium: Sultan Ibrahim Stadium; Attendance: 25,886; Referee: Mohd Fusser Bin Mad Sallih

7 October 2022 20 (Rescheduled)	Sri Pahang	0–0	Johor Darul Ta'zim	Kuantan
21:00 UTC+8				Stadium: Darul Makmur Stadium; Attendance: 6,040; Referee: Amirul Izwan

11 October 2022 21 (Rescheduled)	Johor Darul Ta'zim	4–1	Kedah Darul Aman	Johor
21:00 UTC+8	Bergson 50' (pen) 89'; Syafiq Ahmad 63' 67'		Ronald Ngah 45'	Stadium: Sultan Ibrahim Stadium; Attendance: 16,029; Referee: Mohd Hasrol Bin Mohd Amir

15 October 2022 22 (Rescheduled)	Johor Darul Ta'zim	3–0	Sabah	Johor
21:00 UTC+8	Bergson 17' 55'; Arif Aiman 39'			Stadium: Sultan Ibrahim Stadium; Attendance: 34,038; Referee: Razlan Joffri Ali

=== Malaysia FA Cup ===
12 March 2022 Round of 32	Johor Darul Ta'zim	10–0	BRM (M3)	Iskandar Puteri, Johor
21:00 UTC+8	Fernando Forestieri 2', 24', 42' (pen.); Safiq Rahim 7'; Safawi Rasid 19'; Maurício 56'; Moussa Sidibé 70' (pen.); Daryl Sham 82'; Mohamadou Sumareh 89'; Danial Amier 90+3'			Stadium: Sultan Ibrahim Stadium; Attendance: 5,505; Referee: Khirulazuan Kidam

14 May 2022 Round of 16	Johor Darul Ta'zim	3–0	Sarawak United (M1)	Iskandar Puteri, Johor
20:15 UTC+8	Faiz 6'; Forestieri 15', 43'			Stadium: Sultan Ibrahim Stadium; Attendance: 8,587; Referee: Khirulazuan Kidam

23 July 2022 Quarter Final	Melaka United (M1)	1–2	Johor Darul Ta'zim	Malacca
21:00 UTC+8	Sony Norde 84' (pen.)		Hazwan 4'; Bergson 90+2'	Stadium: Hang Jebat Stadium; Attendance: 18,289; Referee: Khirulazuan Kidam

5 August 2022 Semi Final	Johor Darul Ta'zim	6–1	Penang (M1)	Iskandar Puteri
21:00 UTC+8	Bergson 19'; Forestieri 24'; Arif Aiman 48', 51', 62'; Syahmi Safari 90+2'		Lucas Silva 54'	Stadium: Sultan Ibrahim Stadium; Attendance: 34,213; Referee: Razlan Joffri Ali

10 September 2022 Final	Terengganu (M1)	1–3	Johor Darul Ta'zim	Bukit Jalil
21:00 UTC+8	Kipré 75'		Arif Aiman 34'; Bergson 63' (pen.), 78'	Stadium: Bukit Jalil National Stadium; Attendance: 84,321; Referee: Muhammad Nazmi Nasaruddin

=== Malaysia Cup ===
Win Draw Loss

==== Bracket ====
The bracket was decided after the draw for the round of 16, which was held on 6 October 2022 at the MFL House in Kuala Lumpur.

Round of 16
Penang	2	1	3
Kuching City (a.e.t.)	2	2	4
UiTM	1	1	2
Sabah	2	1	3
Sarawak United	0	1	1
Kelantan	1	1	2
Petaling Jaya City	0	0	0
Johor Darul Ta'zim	4	2	6
Kelantan United	0	0	0
Selangor	2	1	3
Kedah Darul Aman	1	0	1
Negeri Sembilan	2	0	2
PDRM	0	0	0
Kuala Lumpur City	3	1	4
Sri Pahang	1	2	3
Terengganu	5	4	9

Quarter-finals
Kuching City	0	1	1
Sabah (a.e.t.)	1	1	2
Kelantan	0	0	0
Johor Darul Ta'zim	3	5	8
Selangor	2	2	4
Negeri Sembilan	0	2	2
Kuala Lumpur City	0	1	1
Terengganu	1	3	4

Semi-finals
Sabah	0	1	1
Johor Darul Ta'zim	1	3	4
Selangor	3	0	3
Terengganu	1	1	2

Final
Johor Darul Ta'zim	2
Selangor	1

==== Round of 16 ====
26 October 2022 R16 1st leg	Petaling Jaya City	0–4	Johor Darul Ta'zim	Petaling Jaya
21:00		Report	Shahrul Saad 5'; Safawi Rasid 39'; Akhyar Rashid 70'; Fernando Forestieri 80'	Stadium: Petaling Jaya Stadium; Attendance: 2,747; Referee: Fusser Sallih

31 October 2022 R16 2nd leg	Johor Darul Ta'zim	2–0 (6–0 agg.)	Petaling Jaya City	Iskandar Puteri
20:15	Bergson 4'; Forestieri 73'	Report		Stadium: Sultan Ibrahim Stadium; Attendance: 11,968; Referee: Khirulazuan Kidam

Johor Darul Ta'zim won 6–0 on aggregate.

==== Quarter-final ====
5 November 2022 QF 1st leg	Kelantan	0–3	Johor Darul Ta'zim	Kota Bharu
21:00		Report	Bergson 29'; Syafiq 37'; Velázquez 74'	Stadium: Sultan Muhammad IV Stadium; Attendance: 20,011; Referee: Zulkarnain Zakaria

11 November 2022 QF 2nd leg	Johor Darul Ta'zim	5–0 (8–0 agg.)	Kelantan	Iskandar Puteri
20:15	Bergson 12', 34', 37'; Syahmi 40'; Nazmi 45+1'	Report		Stadium: Sultan Ibrahim Stadium; Attendance: 27,320; Referee: Suhaizi Shukri

Johor Darul Ta'zim won 8–0 on aggregate.

==== Semi-final ====
15 November 2022 SF 1st leg	Sabah	0–1	Johor Darul Ta'zim	Kota Kinabalu
20:15		Report	Arif 34'	Stadium: Likas Stadium; Attendance: 14,000; Referee: Razlan Joffri Ali

19 November 2022 SF 2nd leg	Johor Darul Ta'zim	3–1 (4–1 agg.)	Sabah	Iskandar Puteri
21:00	Bergson 35'; Forestieri 41'; Syafiq 90+3'	Report	Kagayama 47'	Stadium: Sultan Ibrahim Stadium; Attendance: 33,445; Referee: Nazmi Nasaruddin

Johor Darul Ta'zim won 4–1 on aggregate.

==== Final ====
26 November 2022 Final	Johor Darul Ta'zim	2–1	Selangor	Bukit Jalil
21:00	Bergson 45+2'; Forestieri 59'		Caion 45'	Stadium: Bukit Jalil National Stadium; Referee: Nazmi Nasaruddin

=== AFC Champions League ===
==== Group stage ====
Pos	Team	Pld	W	D	L	GF	GA	GD	Pts	Qualification	JDT	KSF	ULS	GZH
1	(Malaysia) Johor Darul Ta'zim (H)	6	4	1	1	11	7	+4	13	Advance to Round of 16	—	0–5	2–1	5–0
2	(Japan) Kawasaki Frontale	6	3	2	1	17	4	+13	11		0–0	—	1–1	1–0
3	(South Korea) Ulsan Hyundai	6	3	1	2	14	7	+7	10		1–2	3–2	—	3–0
4	(China) Guangzhou	6	0	0	6	0	24	−24	0		0–2	0–8	0–5	—

Source: AFC
Rules for classification: Tiebreakers
(H) Hosts

15 April 2022 Matchday 1	Johor Darul Ta'zim (Malaysia)	5–0	(China) Guangzhou	Iskandar Puteri, Johor
	Bergson 10', 27', 52'; He Lipan 13' (o.g.); Ramadhan 81'	Report		Stadium: Sultan Ibrahim Stadium; Attendance: 14,545; Referee: Mohammed Al-Hoish (Saudi Arabia)

18 April 2022 Matchday 2	Ulsan Hyundai (South Korea)	1–2	(Malaysia) Johor Darul Ta'zim	Iskandar Puteri, Johor
	Um Won-sang 52'	Report	Forestieri 3'; Bergson 80'	Stadium: Sultan Ibrahim Stadium; Attendance: 11,419; Referee: Omar Al-Yaqoubi (Oman)

21 April 2022 Matchday 3	Kawasaki Frontale (Japan)	0–0	(Malaysia) Johor Darul Ta'zim	Iskandar Puteri, Johor
		Report		Stadium: Sultan Ibrahim Stadium; Attendance: 17,592; Referee: Mohammed Al Hoaish (Saudi Arabia)

24 April 2022 Matchday 4	Johor Darul Ta'zim (Malaysia)	0–5	(Japan) Kawasaki Frontale	Iskandar Puteri, Johor
		Report	Wakizaka 14'; Kobayashi 31', 43'; Marcinho 81'; Songkrasin 88'	Stadium: Sultan Ibrahim Stadium; Attendance: 16,679; Referee: Nawaf Shukralla (Bahrain)

27 April 2022 Matchday 5	Guangzhou (China)	0–2	(Malaysia) Johor Darul Ta'zim	Iskandar Puteri, Johor
		Report	Bergson 16' (pen.), 90+6' (pen.)	Stadium: Sultan Ibrahim Stadium; Attendance: 10,352; Referee: Payam Heydari

30 April 2022 Matchday 6	Johor Darul Ta'zim (Malaysia)	2–1	(South Korea) Ulsan Hyundai	Iskandar Puteri, Johor
	Leandro 5'; Park 90+4' (o.g.)	Report	Jun 6'	Stadium: Sultan Ibrahim Stadium; Attendance: 17,940; Referee: Nawaf Shukralla (Bahrain)

==== Knockout stage ====
Round of 16

19 August 2022 Round of 16	Johor Darul Ta'zim (Malaysia)	0–5	(Japan) Urawa Red Diamonds	Saitama
20:00 UTC+9		Report	Scholz 8' (pen.); Karlsson 19', 39'; Junker 84', 90+1'	Stadium: Saitama Stadium 2002; Attendance: 20,691; Referee: Chris Beath (Australia)

== Club statistics ==
Correct as of match played on 15 May 2022

=== Appearances ===
@ 20 Nov 2022

No.	Pos.	Player	Malaysia Super League		FA Cup		Malaysia Cup		ACL / AFC Cup		Charity Shield		Total	
No.	Pos.	Player	Apps.	Goals	Apps.	Goals	Apps.	Goals	Apps.	Goals	Apps.	Goals	Apps.	Goals
1	GK	(Malaysia) Farizal Marlias	20	0	4	0	4	0	5	0	1	0	30	0
2	DF	(Malaysia) (Australia) Matthew Davies	17	0	3	0	5	0	6	0	1	0	27	0
3	DF	(Malaysia) Adam Nor Azlin	2	0	1+1	0	1	0	0+1	0	0	0	5	0
4	MF	(Malaysia) Afiq Fazail	13+2	1	4	0	3+2	0	4+1	0	0+1	1	25	2
5	MF	(Malaysia) Syamer Kutty Abba	0+1	0	1	0	0	0	1	0	0	0	3	0
6	MF	(Malaysia) (England) Hong Wan	7+6	0	4	0	3+2	0	2+2	0	0+1	0	22	0
7	DF	(Malaysia) Aidil Zafuan	1+2	0	1+1	0	0+2	0	0+1	0	0	0	6	0
8	MF	(Malaysia) Safiq Rahim	3+8	0	1+3	1	1+2	0	0+3	0	0	0	18	1
9	FW	(Brazil) Bergson	19	29	3+1	4	5	6	6	6	1	0	30	39
10	MF	(Argentina) Leandro Velazquez	18	5	4	0	3	1	5	1	1	0	28	6
11	FW	(Malaysia) Safawi Rasid	0+14	2	1+2	1	1+2	1	1+4	0	0+1	0	23	3
12	DF	(Malaysia) S. Kunanlan	2	0	0	0	0+1	0	0+1	0	0	0	3	0
13	MF	(Malaysia) (The Gambia) Mohamadou Sumareh	0+5	1	0+2	1	0+1	0	0+1	0	0	0	8	2
14	DF	(Australia) (Republic of Ireland) Shane Lowry	16	0	3	0	0	0	6	0	1	0	26	0
15	DF	(Malaysia) Feroz Baharudin	3	0	0	0	4	0	0	0	0	0	3	0
16	MF	(Malaysia) Danial Amier Norhisham	1	0	0+2	1	0+1	0	0	0	0	0	3	1
17	FW	(Malaysia) Ramadhan Saifullah	1+10	0	1+2	0	1	0	1+5	1	0+1	0	21	1
18	FW	(Malaysia) Hazwan Bakri	2+2	1	1	1	0	0	0+2	0	0	0	7	2
19	FW	(Malaysia) Akhyar Rashid	3+4	1	1	0	1+2	2	1	0	0	0	9	1
20	DF	(Malaysia) Azrif Nasrulhaq	0	0	0	0	0	0	0	0	0	0	0	0
21	MF	(Malaysia) Nazmi Faiz	8+6	0	1+3	1	4+1	1	3+3	0	1	1	25	2
22	DF	(Malaysia) (Canada) Corbin-Ong	22	0	4	0	4+1	0	6	0	1	0	33	0
23	DF	(Philippines) (Spain) Carli de Murga	8	1	1	0	0	0	1	0	1	0	11	1
24	GK	(Malaysia) Izham Tarmizi	0	0	0	0	0	0	0+1	0	0	0	1	0
25	FW	(Mali) (Spain) Moussa Sidibé	1+2	0	0+1	1	0	0	0	0	0	0	4	1
26	GK	(Malaysia) Haziq Nadzli	2+1	0	1	0	0	0	2	0	0	0	6	0
28	FW	(Malaysia) Syafiq Ahmad	2+5	2	0+1	0	3+2	1	0	0	0	0	8	2
30	MF	(Malaysia) (Spain) Natxo Insa	15	0	1	0	3	0	5	0	1	0	22	0
31	FW	(Malaysia) (Brazil) Guilherme de Paula	0	0	0	0	0	0	0	0	0	0	0	0
32	DF	(Malaysia) Shahrul Saad	18+2	0	3	0	5	1	6	0	0+1	0	30	0
33	DF	(Malaysia) (England) Daniel Ting	0	0	0	0	0	0	0	0	0	0	0	0
38	MF	(Malaysia) (England) Junior Eldstål	0	0	0	0	0	0	0	0	0	0	0	0
40	FW	(Malaysia) Adam Farhan	0	0	0	0	0+1	0	0	0	0	0	0	0
42	FW	(Malaysia) Arif Aiman Hanapi	21	3	4	4	4	1	6+1	0	1	0	33	7
45	FW	(Argentina) (Italy) Fernando Forestieri	17+1	12	5	6	3+3	3	6	1	1	1	30	20
55	MF	(Indonesia) (Spain) Jordi Amat	0	0	0	0	0	4	0	0	0	1	0	
81	MF	(Malaysia) Daryl Sham	0+1	0	0+1	1	0	1	0	0	0	0	2	1
91	DF	(Malaysia) Syahmi Safari	1+9	1	0+3	1	2+1	1	1+2	0	0	0	16	2
92	FW	(Gabon) Lévy Madinda	0	0	0	0	0	0	0	0	0	0	0	0
Players who have played this season but had left the club or on loan to other club
27	FW	(Philippines) (Spain) Bienvenido Marañón	0	0	1	0	0	0	1	0	0	0	2	0
33	DF	(Brazil) Maurício Nascimento	0	0	1	1	0	0	1	0	0	0	2	1
99	FW	(Spain) Fernando Rodríguez	1+2	1	0	0	0	0	0	0	0	0	3	1

== Johor Darul Ta'zim II ==
=== Malaysia Premier League ===
Pos	Team	Pld	W	D	L	GF	GA	GD	Pts	Qualification or relegation
1	Johor Darul Ta'zim II (Note: Johor Darul Ta'zim II, Selangor II, and Terengganu II aren't eligible to promote as their parent clubs (Johor Darul Ta'zim, Selangor, and Terengganu) play in the Super League. These feeder teams can only play in leagues below their parents'. They also can't play in the Malaysian Cup as they're only eligible to play in the Malaysian Cup if their parents fail to do so (which is not possible currently).) (C)	18	13	3	2	38	13	+25	42	Relocated to MFL Cup
2	Kelantan	18	11	4	3	27	14	+13	37	Promotion to Super League and Qualification to Malaysia Cup
3	Kuching City	18	10	4	4	30	20	+10	34	Promotion to Super League and Qualification to Malaysia Cup
4	Terengganu II	18	10	3	5	29	18	+11	33	Relocated to MFL Cup
5	Kelantan United	18	6	7	5	23	19	+4	25	Promotion to Super League and Qualification to Malaysia Cup

Updated to match(es) played on 4 September 2022. Source: MFL
Rules for classification: 1) Points; 2) Goal difference; 3) Number of goals scored.
(C) Champions
Notes:

5 March 2022 1	Johor Darul Ta'zim	1–2	Kelantan	Johor Bahru
8.45 PM	Daryl Sham 75'	Report	Natanael Siringo 7'; Jasmir Mehat 90'	Stadium: Tan Sri Dato' Haji Hassan Yunos Stadium

18 March 2022 2	Johor Darul Ta'zim	2–0	Kelantan United	Johor Bahru
	Daryl Sham 35'; Fernando Rodriguez 75'	Report		Stadium: Pasir Gudang Corporation Stadium

26 March 2022 3	Johor Darul Ta'zim	2–1	FAM-MSN Project	Johor
	Feroz Baharudin 29'; Moussa Sidibé 21'	Report	Haikal Sahar 26'	Stadium: Pasir Gudang Corporation Stadium

9 April 2022 4	UiTM	1–2	Johor Darul Ta'zim	Shah Alam
	Nazirul Hasif 75'	Report	Fernando Rodriguez 16'; Moussa Sidibé 29'	Stadium: UiTM Stadium

17 April 2022 5	Johor Darul Ta'zim	3–1	Kuching City	Johor
	Fernando Rodriguez 18'; Adam Nor Azlin 54'; Moussa Sidibé 67'	Report	Alif Hassan 62'	Stadium: Pasir Gudang Corporation Stadium

23 April 2022 6	Perak	1–3	Johor Darul Ta'zim	Ipoh
10.00 p.m.	Adam Farhan 38'	Report	Fernando Rodriguez 25' 36'; Adam Farhan 52'	Stadium: Perak Stadium

7 May 2022 7	Johor Darul Ta'zim	5–1	PDRM	Johor
	Bienvenido Maranon 47', 89'; Fernando Rodriguez 66'; Syamer Kutty Abba 55'; Gabriel Nistelrooy 69'	Report	Martin Adamec 72'	Stadium: Pasir Gudang Corporation Stadium

20 May 2022 8	Terengganu II	2–1	Johor Darul Ta'zim	Kuala Terengganu
	Zuasyraf Zulkiefle 63'; Wan Fazli Wan Ghazali 85'	Report	Bienvenido Maranon 43'	Stadium: Sultan Ismail Nasiruddin Shah Stadium

27 May 2022 9	Johor Darul Ta'zim	3–2	Selangor II	Johor
	Fernando Rodriguez 53' (pen.) 60'; Gabriel Nistelrooy 90+2'		Nik Sharif Haseefy 60'; Khairi Suffian 76'	Stadium: Sultan Ibrahim Stadium

22 July 2022 10 (Rescheduled)	Kelantan	1–1	Johor Darul Ta'zim	Kelantan
				Stadium: Sultan Muhammad IV Stadium

3 August 2022 11 (Rescheduled)	Kelantan United	1–1	Johor Darul Ta'zim	Kelantan
				Stadium: Sultan Muhammad IV Stadium

25 August 2022 12 (Rescheduled)	FAM-MSN Project	0–2	Johor Darul Ta'zim	Shah Alam
				Stadium: UiTM Stadium

26 July 2022 13	Johor Darul Ta'zim	4–0	UiTM	Johor
				Stadium: Sultan Ibrahim Stadium

9 August 2022 14	Kuching City	0–0	Johor Darul Ta'zim	Kuching
				Stadium: Sarawak Stadium

13 August 2022 15	Johor Darul Ta'zim	1–0	Perak	Johor
				Stadium: Sultan Ibrahim Stadium

21 August 2022 16	PDRM	0–3	Johor Darul Ta'zim	Kuala Lumpur
				Stadium: Kuala Lumpur Stadium

4 September 2022 17	Johor Darul Ta'zim	3–0	Terengganu II	Johor
				Stadium: Sultan Ibrahim Stadium

17 September 2022 18	Selangor II	0–1	Johor Darul Ta'zim	Shah Alam
				Stadium: UiTM Stadium

=== Squad staticstics ===
As of match played 30 September 2022

No.	Pos	Nat	Player	Total		League	
No.	Pos	Nat	Player	Apps	Goals	Apps	Goals
Goalkeepers
1	GK	(Malaysia) MAS	Shaheeswaran Thavakumar	2	0	2	0
42	GK	(Malaysia) MAS	Izham Tarmizi	13	0	13	0
27	GK	(Malaysia) MAS	Rozaimi Rahamat	2	0	2	0
62	GK	(Malaysia) MAS	Haziq Nadzli	1	0	1	0
Defenders
2	DF	(Malaysia) MAS	Nafizuddin Fauzi	5	0	3+2	0
6	DF	(Malaysia) MAS	Hafiy Haikal	6	0	2+4	0
15	DF	(Malaysia) MAS	Junior Eldstål	8	1	8	1
17	DF	(Malaysia) MAS	Alif Mutalib	13	0	5+8	0
24	DF	(Malaysia) MAS	Nizarruddin Jazi	11	0	2+9	0
29	DF	(Malaysia) MAS	Naqiu Aiman	1	0	0+1	0
30	DF	(Malaysia) MAS	Adam Nor Azlin	8	1	8	1
40	DF	(Malaysia) MAS	Azrif Nasrulhaq	15	0	15	0
44	DF	(Malaysia) MAS	Daniel Ting	8	0	8	0
51	DF	(Malaysia) MAS	Feroz Baharudin	17	3	17	3
93	DF	(Malaysia) MAS	Syahmi Safari	1	0	1	0
Midfielders
8	MF	(Malaysia) MAS	Rafiefikri Rosman	4	0	1+3	0
10	MF	(Gabon) GAB	Lévy Madinda	9	1	9	1
11	MF	(Malaysia) MAS	Chia Ruo Han	7	0	0+7	0
13	MF	(Malaysia) MAS	Aysar Hadi	15	0	14+1	0
16	MF	(Malaysia) MAS	Umar Hakeem	11	1	9+2	1
18	MF	(Malaysia) MAS	Daryl Sham	17	9	16+1	9
20	MF	(Malaysia) MAS	Danial Haqim	6	0	1+5	0
21	MF	(Malaysia) MAS	Aiman Danish	4	0	0+4	0
28	MF	(Malaysia) MAS	Adam Farhan	16	1	14+2	1
50	MF	(Malaysia) MAS	Syamer Kutty Abba	1	1	1	1
52	MF	(Mali) MLI	Moussa Sidibé	14	5	14	5
60	MF	(Malaysia) MAS	Hong Wan	1	0	1	0
61	MF	(Malaysia) MAS	Danial Amier	2	0	2	0
Forwards
9	FW	(Spain) ESP	Fernando Rodríguez	10	8	10	8
12	FW	(Malaysia) MAS	Awang Muhammad Faiz	1	0	0+1	0
19	FW	(Malaysia) MAS	Gabriel Nistelrooy	15	3	3+12	3
26	FW	(Malaysia) MAS	Amirul Husaini	1	0	0+1	0
71	FW	(Malaysia) MAS	Ramadhan Saifullah	1	0	1	0
72	FW	(Philippines) PHI	Bienvenido Marañón	7	3	7	3
77	FW	(Malaysia) MAS	Guilherme de Paula	3	0	3	0
81	FW	(Malaysia) MAS	Hazwan Bakri	6	0	5+1	0
Players loaned out during the season
