= 2021 Johor Darul Ta'zim II F.C. season =

Johor Darul Ta'zim II
2021 season
- President: Tunku Aminah Sultan Ibrahim
- Head coach: Rafa Gil
- Stadium: Tan Sri Dato' Haji Hassan Yunos Stadium
- Malaysia Premier League: 4th
- Top goalscorer: Fernando Rodríguez (16)
- Highest home attendance: 0
- Lowest home attendance: 0
- Average home league attendance: 0
- All statistics correct as of 21 September 2021.

Johor Darul Ta'zim II F.C. played in the 2021 season of the Malaysia Premier League.

== Season overview ==
On 4 April 2021, the club won over Projek FAM-MSN 5–0 in an away league match.

On 7 April 2021, the club won 1–0 over PDRM in league match.

On 12 April 2021, the club draw 0–0 against Selangor II.

On 20 July 2021, the club won 2–0 over Sabah in a friendly match at Tan Sri Dato Hj Hassan Yunos Stadium.

On 4 August 2021, Johor Darul Ta'zim II beat Perak II 2-0 during Malaysia Premier League campaign.

On 7 August 2021, the club won 5–1 over Projek FAM-MSN.

== Competitions ==
=== Malaysia Premier League ===
==== League table ====
Pos	Team	Pld	W	D	L	GF	GA	GD	Pts	Qualification or relegation
2	Sarawak United (P)	20	11	5	4	37	14	+23	38	Promotion to Super League and Qualification for the Malaysia Cup group stage
3	Terengganu II (Note: Johor Darul Ta'zim II, Perak II, Selangor II and Terengganu II cannot be promoted from Malaysia Premier League and play in Malaysia Cup as Johor Darul Ta'zim F.C., Perak FA, Selangor F.C. and Terengganu FC (their parent clubs) remain in Malaysia Super League and play in Malaysia Cup. Should the team be relegated to Malaysia Premier League or will not play in Malaysia Cup, Johor Darul Ta'zim II, Perak II, Selangor II and Terengganu II will have to drop to Malaysia M3 League or will play in Malaysia Cup.)	20	9	8	3	37	18	+19	35	
4	Johor Darul Ta'zim II	20	9	7	4	38	20	+18	34	
5	Kuching City	20	7	6	7	22	22	0	27	Qualification for the Malaysia Cup group stage
6	Kelantan	20	8	3	9	23	28	−5	27	Qualification for the Malaysia Cup group stage

Source: MFL
Rules for classification: 1) Points; 2) Goal difference; 3) Number of goals scored.
(P) Promoted

==== Match results ====
Win Draw Loss

6 March 2021 1	Negeri Sembilan	2–1	Johor Darul Ta'zim II	Paroi
21:00 UTC+8	Zaquan 24' (pen.); Akono 52' (pen.)		Rafiefikri 45'	Stadium: Tuanku Abdul Rahman Stadium; Referee: Noor Azriel Baharudin

13 March 2021 2	Johor Darul Ta'zim II	3–1	Kuching City	Johor Bahru
21:00 UTC+8	Fernández 49'; Feroz 52', 78'		Hudson 22'	Stadium: Tan Sri Dato' Haji Hassan Yunos Stadium; Referee: Mohd Sarif Tahir

16 March 2021 3	Kelantan United	0–0	Johor Darul Ta'zim II	Kota Bharu
16:45 UTC+8				Stadium: Sultan Muhammad IV Stadium; Referee: Muhammad Shahrul Amin Abdul Aziz

20 March 2021 4	Johor Darul Ta'zim II	3–2	Perak II	Johor Bahru
21:00 UTC+8	Rodríguez 16'; Feroz 62'; Cabrera 68'		Adib 6' (pen.); Farid 38'	Stadium: Tan Sri Dato' Haji Hassan Yunos Stadium; Referee: Muhammad Khairulsyahmi Ahmad Khalidi

4 April 2021 5	FAM-MSN Project	0–5	Johor Darul Ta'zim II	Shah Alam
21:00 UTC+8			Rodríguez 32', 57', 59'; Fernández 33'; Firdaus 45'	Stadium: UiTM Stadium; Referee: Jubik Andangon

7 April 2021 6	Johor Darul Ta'zim II	1–0	PDRM	Johor Bahru
21:00 UTC+8	Rodríguez 6'			Stadium: Tan Sri Dato' Haji Hassan Yunos Stadium

11 April 2021 7	Johor Darul Ta'zim II	0–0	Selangor II	Johor Bahru
21:00 UTC+8				Stadium: Tan Sri Dato' Haji Hassan Yunos Stadium; Referee: Muhammad Nasruddin Muhammad Tamrin

17 April 2021 8	Terengganu II	4–3	Johor Darul Ta'zim II	Kuala Terengganu
22:00 UTC+8	Mintah 41', 90'; Redžović 52'; Watanabe 83'		Fernández 22'; Rodríguez 45', 69'	Stadium: Sultan Ismail Nasiruddin Shah Stadium; Referee: Jeevanathan M. Ponniamoorthy

23 April 2021 9	Johor Darul Ta'zim II	1–1	Kelantan	Johor Bahru
22:00 UTC+8	Rodríguez 60'		Nurshamil 71'	Stadium: Tan Sri Dato' Haji Hassan Yunos Stadium; Referee: Muhammad Nasruddin Muhammad Tamrin

1 May 2021 10	Sarawak United	1–0	Johor Darul Ta'zim II	Kuala Terengganu
22:00 UTC+8	Norshahrul 85'			Stadium: Sultan Ismail Nasiruddin Shah Stadium; Referee: Wan Mohamad Tarmizi Wan Ibrahim

7 May 2021 11	Johor Darul Ta'zim II	0–0	Negeri Sembilan	Johor Bahru
22:00 UTC+8				Stadium: Tan Sri Dato' Haji Hassan Yunos Stadium; Referee: Ahmad Dzuhaidi Zulkifli

1 August 2021 12	Johor Darul Ta'zim II	3–0	Kelantan United	Johor Bahru
21:00 UTC+8	Rodríguez 15', 60'; Alif 85'			Stadium: Tan Sri Dato' Haji Hassan Yunos Stadium; Referee: Muhammad Khairulsyahmi Ahmad Khalidi

4 August 2021 13	Perak II	0–2	Johor Darul Ta'zim II	Ipoh
21:00 UTC+8			Irfan 70'; Daryl Sham 90'	Stadium: Perak Stadium; Referee: Muhammad Almi Abdullah

7 August 2021 14	Johor Darul Ta'zim II	5–1	FAM-MSN Project	Johor Bahru
21:00 UTC+8	Daryl Sham 14'; Rodríguez 19', 89'; Chia Ruo Han 35'; Hirose 59'		Azhad Harraz 80'	Stadium: Tan Sri Dato' Haji Hassan Yunos Stadium; Referee: Jubik Andangon

11 August 2021 15	PDRM	2–2	Johor Darul Ta'zim II	Kuala Lumpur
21:00 UTC+8	Nabil 35'; Suzuki 51'	Report	Gabriel 30', 69'	Stadium: KLFA Stadium; Referee: Mohd Fairuzi Mat Desa

20 August 2021 16	Selangor II	1–1	Johor Darul Ta'zim II	Shah Alam
21:00 UTC+8	Ameyaw 21'	Report	Rodríguez 45'	Stadium: UiTM Stadium; Referee: Mohamad Kamil Zakaria Ismail

25 August 2021 17	Kuching City	2–1	Johor Darul Ta'zim II	Pasir Gudang
16:45 UTC+8	Irwan 59'; Amir 42'	Report	Rodríguez 18'	Stadium: Pasir Gudang Corporation Stadium; Referee: Muhammad Nasruddin Muhammad Tamrin

29 August 2021 18	Johor Darul Ta'zim II	3–2	Terengganu II	Johor Bahru
16:45 UTC+8	Rafiefikri 53'; Rodríguez 60' (pen.); Hirose 78'	Report	Mintah 43'; Watanabe 90+1'	Stadium: Tan Sri Dato' Haji Hassan Yunos Stadium; Referee: Muhammad Izzul Fikri Kamaruzaman

11 September 2021 19	Kelantan	0–3	Johor Darul Ta'zim II	Kota Bahru
16:45 UTC+8		Report	Fadhli 11'; Rodríguez 14'; Hirose 57'	Stadium: Sultan Muhammad IV Stadium; Referee: Hamdan Awang

21 September 2021 20	Johor Darul Ta'zim II	1–1	Sarawak United	Johor Bahru
21:00 UTC+8	Wilkin 84'	Report	Agba 4'	Stadium: Tan Sri Dato' Haji Hassan Yunos Stadium; Referee: Razlan Joffri Ali

== Squad statistics ==
As of match played 21 September 2021

No.	Pos	Nat	Player	Total		League	
No.	Pos	Nat	Player	Apps	Goals	Apps	Goals
1	GK	(Malaysia) MAS	Shaheeswaran Thavakumar	10	0	10	0
2	DF	(Malaysia) MAS	Nafizuddin Fauzi	16	0	15+1	0
3	DF	(Malaysia) MAS	Firdaus Ramli	16	1	15+1	1
4	DF	(Malaysia) MAS	Adib Zainudin	13	0	9+4	0
5	DF	(Malaysia) MAS	Ali Imran Sukari	0	0	0	0
6	DF	(Malaysia) MAS	Hafiy Haikal	8	0	3+5	0
7	MF	(Malaysia) MAS	Irfan Fazail	10	1	4+6	1
8	MF	(Japan) JPN	Kei Hirose	20	2	18+2	2
9	FW	(Spain) ESP	Fernando Rodríguez	16	16	16	16
10	MF	(Argentina) ARG	Nico Fernández	13	3	9+4	3
11	MF	(Malaysia) MAS	Khairullah Halim	2	0	0+2	0
12	DF	(Australia) AUS	Shane Lowry	0	0	0	0
13	MF	(Malaysia) MAS	Aysar Hadi	16	0	15+1	0
14	MF	(Malaysia) MAS	Chia Ruo Han	11	1	7+4	1
16	DF	(Malaysia) MAS	Umar Hakeem	10	0	3+7	0
17	DF	(Malaysia) MAS	Alif Mutalib	10	1	7+3	1
18	FW	(Malaysia) MAS	Awang Faiz Hazziq	3	0	0+3	0
19	FW	(Malaysia) MAS	Gabriel Nistelrooy	8	2	2+6	2
20	MF	(Malaysia) MAS	Danial Haqim	1	0	0+1	0
21	DF	(Malaysia) MAS	Aiman Danish	2	0	0+2	0
22	MF	(Malaysia) MAS	Stuart Wilkin	16	1	13+3	1
23	FW	(Malaysia) MAS	Amirul Husaini	7	0	1+6	0
25	GK	(Malaysia) MAS	Hafiz Azizi	0	0	0	0
26	MF	(Argentina) ARG	Luis Cabrera	6	1	3+3	1
27	GK	(Malaysia) MAS	Rozaimi Rahamat	0	0	0	0
28	GK	(Malaysia) MAS	Riezman Irfan	0	0	0	0
29	MF	(Malaysia) MAS	Rafiefikri Rosman	12	2	9+3	2
30	DF	(Malaysia) MAS	Kiko Insa	0	0	0	0
31	MF	(Malaysia) MAS	Mohamadou Sumareh	0	0	0	0
33	DF	(Malaysia) MAS	Che Suhairi	0	0	0	0
34	DF	(Malaysia) MAS	Daniel Rahman	1	0	0+1	0
35	MF	(Malaysia) MAS	Daryl Sham	7	2	7	2
36	GK	(Malaysia) MAS	Nabil Adzib	0	0	0	0
42	GK	(Malaysia) MAS	Izham Tarmizi	4	0	4	0
50	MF	(Malaysia) MAS	Syamer Kutty Abba	0	0	0	0
51	DF	(Malaysia) MAS	Feroz Baharudin	5	3	5	3
60	DF	(Malaysia) MAS	Syazwan Andik	16	0	15+1	0
61	MF	(Malaysia) MAS	Danial Amier	3	0	3	0
62	GK	(Malaysia) MAS	Haziq Nadzli	6	0	6	0
69	FW	(Malaysia) MAS	Ramadhan Saifullah	0	0	0	0
72	DF	(Malaysia) MAS	Fadhli Shas	10	1	10	1
81	FW	(Malaysia) MAS	Hazwan Bakri	2	0	2	0
82	MF	(Malaysia) MAS	Syafiq Ahmad	3	0	3	0
91	FW	(Malaysia) MAS	Akhyar Rashid	1	0	1	0
99	FW	(Malaysia) MAS	Arif Aiman Hanapi	0	0	0	0
Players away from the club on loan:
15	MF	(Malaysia) MAS	Gary Steven Robbat	9	1	5+4	1

=== Clean sheets ===
As of match played 11 September 2021

Rank	No.	Pos.	Player	League	Malaysia Cup	Total
1	1	GK	(Malaysia) Shaheeswaran Thavakumar	3	0	3
1	42	GK	(Malaysia) Izham Tarmizi	3	0	3
3	62	GK	(Malaysia) Haziq Nadzli	2	0	2
Totals				8	0	8
