= 2020 Johor Darul Ta'zim II F.C. season =

Johor Darul Ta'zim II
2020 season
- President: Tunku Aminah Sultan Ibrahim
- Head coach: Rafa Gil
- Stadium: Tan Sri Dato' Haji Hassan Yunos Stadium
- Malaysia Premier League: 4th
- Top goalscorer: Fernando Rodríguez (17)
- Highest home attendance: 0
- Lowest home attendance: 0
- Average home league attendance: 0
- All statistics correct as of 9 October 2020.

Johor Darul Ta'zim II F.C. played in the 2020 season of the Malaysia Premier League.

== Season overview ==
- On 7 December 2019, former club's captain, Shakir Shaari has been appointed as club's assistant coach.
- On 8 January 2020, club's technical director, Alistair Edwards announced Kei Hirose from Persela Lamongan and Fernando Rodríguez from Kedah Darul Aman as club's new players.
- On 22 January 2020, the club has been defeated 1–2 to Indonesian side Madura United in a friendly match.
- On 9 October 2020, the club lost 0–1 against Kelantan in a league match.

== Competitions ==
=== Malaysia Premier League ===
==== League table ====
Pos	Team	Pld	W	D	L	GF	GA	GD	Pts	Qualification or relegation
3	Kuala Lumpur (P)	11	6	3	2	21	14	+7	21	Promotion to Super League
4	Kuching	11	5	1	5	17	19	−2	16	
5	Johor Darul Ta'zim II (Note: Johor Darul Ta'zim II, Perak II, Selangor II and Terengganu II cannot be promoted from Malaysia Premier League and play in Malaysia Cup as Johor Darul Ta'zim F.C., Perak FA, Selangor F.C. and Terengganu FC (their parent clubs) remain in Malaysia Super League and play in Malaysia Cup. Should the team be relegated to Malaysia Premier League or will not play in Malaysia Cup, Johor Darul Ta'zim II, Perak II, Selangor II and Terengganu II will have to drop to Malaysia M3 League or will play in Malaysia Cup.)	11	4	3	4	20	17	+3	15	
6	Kelantan	11	5	3	3	14	11	+3	15 (Note: Kelantan have been docked three points following the club’s failure to comply with FIFA’s decision.)	
7	Selangor II	11	4	1	6	17	23	−6	13	

Updated to match(es) played on 31 October 2020. Source: MFL
Rules for classification: 1) Points; 2) Goal difference; 3) Number of goals scored.
(P) Promoted

== Squad staticstics ==
As of match played 9 October 2020

No.	Pos	Nat	Player	Total		League	
No.	Pos	Nat	Player	Apps	Goals	Apps	Goals
Goalkeepers
1	GK	(Malaysia) MAS	Shaheeswaran Thavakumar	0	0	0	0
22	GK	(Malaysia) MAS	Rozaimi Rahamat	0	0	0	0
49	GK	(Malaysia) MAS	Hafiz Azizi	0	0	0	0
52	GK	(Malaysia) MAS	Hakeem Hamidun	0	0	0	0
61	GK	(Malaysia) MAS	Julian Bechler	0	0	0	0
62	GK	(Malaysia) MAS	Haziq Nadzli	11	0	11	0
Defenders
2	DF	(Malaysia) MAS	Che Rashid	10	2	10	2
4	DF	(Malaysia) MAS	Firdaus Ramli	3	0	3	0
15	DF	(Malaysia) MAS	Hariz Kamarudin	6	0	2+4	0
17	DF	(Malaysia) MAS	Alif Mutalib	4	0	0+4	0
21	DF	(Malaysia) MAS	Izaffiq Ruzi	0	0	0	0
23	DF	(Malaysia) MAS	Hasbullah Abu Bakar	8	0	6+2	0
24	DF	(Malaysia) MAS	Hafiy Haikal	0	0	0	0
30	DF	(Malaysia) MAS	Kiko Insa	4	2	4	2
40	DF	(Malaysia) MAS	Adib Zainudin	8	0	7+1	0
41	DF	(Malaysia) MAS	Feroz Baharudin	7	2	6+1	2
46	DF	(Malaysia) MAS	Aiman Danish	3	0	0+3	0
60	DF	(Malaysia) MAS	Syazwan Andik	9	1	9	1
88	DF	(Malaysia) MAS	Ghaffar Rahman	0	0	0	0
Midfielders
5	MF	(Malaysia) MAS	Syamer Kutty Abba	1	0	1	0
8	MF	(Japan) JPN	Kei Hirose	8	0	7+1	0
7	MF	(Malaysia) MAS	Irfan Fazail	2	0	1+1	0
10	MF	(Argentina) ARG	Nico Fernández	6	3	6	3
12	MF	(Argentina) ARG	Luis Cabrera	6	1	6	1
13	MF	(Malaysia) MAS	Gary Steven Robbat	5	0	5	0
16	MF	(Malaysia) MAS	Umar Hakeem	3	0	1+2	0
20	MF	(Malaysia) MAS	Danial Haqim	4	0	2+2	0
27	MF	(Malaysia) MAS	Fahmi Faizal	0	0	0	0
29	MF	(Malaysia) MAS	Azrul Haziq	0	0	0	0
42	MF	(Malaysia) MAS	Arif Aiman Hanapi	6	0	6	0
47	MF	(Malaysia) MAS	Rafiefikri Rosman	5	0	4+1	0
50	MF	(Malaysia) MAS	Syamer Kutty Abba	2	0	2	0
51	MF	(Malaysia) MAS	Aysar Hadi	1	0	0+1	0
66	MF	(Malaysia) MAS	Nur Aqmal Nayan	0	0	0	0
77	MF	(Malaysia) MAS	Syafiq Heelmi	0	0	0	0
80	MF	(Malaysia) MAS	Liridon Krasniqi	5	0	5	0
Forwards
9	FW	(Spain) ESP	Fernando Rodríguez	10	7	10	7
11	FW	(Malaysia) MAS	Rozaimi Rahman	7	0	2+5	0
18	FW	(Malaysia) MAS	Awang Faiz Hazziq	0	0	0	0
19	FW	(Malaysia) MAS	Ramadhan Saifullah	5	1	5	1
43	FW	(Malaysia) MAS	Amirul Husaini	5	0	0+5	0
45	FW	(Malaysia) MAS	Gabriel Nistelrooy	3	0	1+2	0
Players loaned out during the season
