= Moussa Sidibé =

French footballer (born 1981)

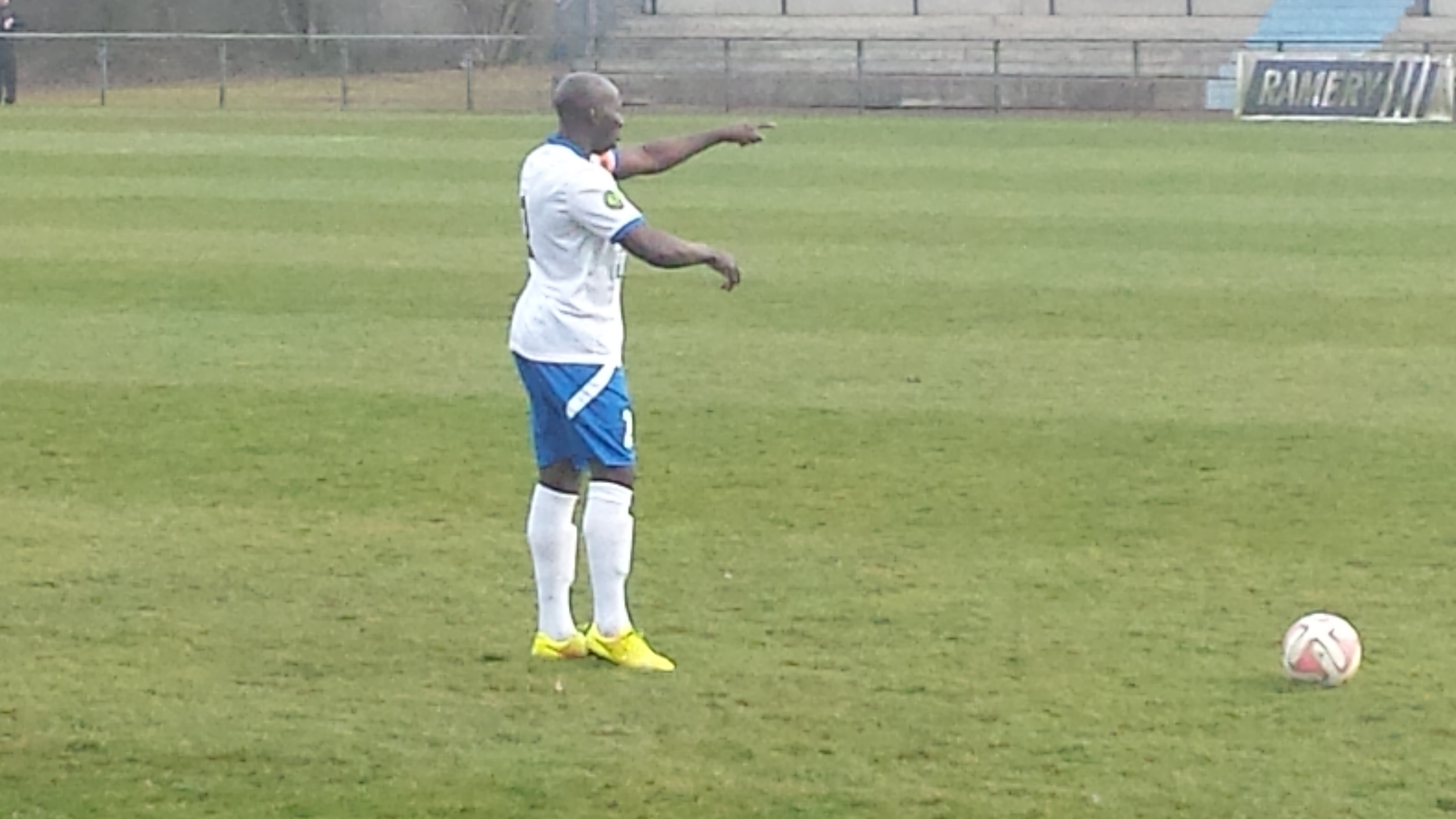
- Sidibé in 2015

Personal information
- Full name: Moussa Sidibé
- Date of birth: 22 August 1981 (age 45)
- Place of birth: Paris, France
- Height: 1.80 m (5 ft 11 in)
- Positions: Left-back; left midfielder

Team information
- Current team: Noisy-le-Grand (Manager)

Senior career*
Years	Team	Apps	(Gls)
2000–2003	Creteil	1	(0)
2003–2005	Gravesend & Northfleet	39	(3)
2004–2005	→ Welling United (loan)	8	(0)
2005–2006	Gazélec Ajaccio	23	(3)
2006–2008	Clermont	5	(0)
2008–2009	Vannes	17	(3)
2009–2013	Nîmes	100	(1)
2013–2015	Beauvais	45	(0)
2015–2017	US Roye-Noyon	31	(0)
Total		269	(10)

Managerial career
- 2018–: Noisy-le-Grand
- * Club domestic league appearances and goals

Moussa Sidibé (born 22 August 1981) is a French former professional footballer who played as a left-back or left midfielder and current manager of Noisy-le-Grand.

He is the cousin of Mamady Sidibé. Originally, Sidibé was a striker like his brother. Sidibé previously played for Creteil, Vannes and Nîmes in Ligue 2. (Note: Moussa Sidibé – French league stats at LFP – also available in French (archived)) He has French and Malian nationalities.
