= Alif Mutalib =

Malaysian footballer

Personal information
- Full name: Muhamad Alif bin Abdul Mutalib
- Date of birth: 16 January 2002 (age 24)
- Place of birth: Alor Setar, Kedah, Malaysia
- Height: 1.62 m (5 ft 4 in)
- Position: Winger

Team information
- Current team: Negeri Sembilan
- Number: 17

Youth career
- 2015–2019: Mokhtar Dahari Academy
- 2020: Johor Darul Ta'zim III

Senior career*
Years	Team	Apps	(Gls)
2020–2026	Johor Darul Ta'zim II	50	(3)
2026–	Negeri Sembilan	0	(0)

International career^{‡}
2018	Malaysia U16	3	(0)
- * Club domestic league appearances and goals as of 7 July 2026 (UTC) ‡ National team caps and goals as of 7 July 2026

Muhamad Alif bin Abdul Mutalib (born 16 January 2002) is a Malaysian professional footballer who plays as a winger for Malaysia Super League club Negeri Sembilan.

== Club career ==
=== Early career ===
Alif Mutalib began his football development at the Mokhtar Dahari Academy, where he trained under the National Football Development Programme (NFDP) from 2015 to 2019. After graduating from the academy, he was signed by Johor Darul Ta'zim in 2020 and joined JDT III before making his debut for JDT II in the Malaysia Premier League on 24 February 2020 against Negeri Sembilan.

=== Johor Darul Ta'zim II ===
During the 2020 season, Alif made four appearances for JDT II in the Malaysia Premier League while spending most of the campaign with JDT III in the President's Cup. In 2021, he established himself as a regular in the JDT II squad, making 10 league appearances and scoring his first goal for the club. During the 2022 season, Alif continued as a regular for JDT II, making 13 appearances in the Malaysia Premier League.

During the 2023 and 2024–25 seasons, Alif represented JDT II in the MFL Cup. On 20 November 2024, Alif made his senior debut for Johor Darul Ta'zim in the Malaysia Cup against KL Rovers

In the 2025–26 season, Alif competed with JDT II in the Malaysia A1 Semi-Pro League, helping the club win its first league title in the competition. He made 23 appearances and scored one goal as JDT II secured the championship. In June 2026, Alif bid farewell to Johor Darul Ta'zim after seven years with the club, bringing an end to his long association with the Southern Tigers.

=== Negeri Sembilan ===
On 5 July 2026, Negeri Sembilan FC announced the signing of Alif ahead of the 2026–27 season.

== International career ==
=== Youth ===
Alif has represented Malaysia at all youth level from the under 16-side to the under-23 sides. He was part of the national team for the 2018 AFC U-16 Championship that took place in Kuala Lumpur, Malaysia.

== Personal life ==
Alif was born in Alor Setar, Kedah, where he spent his early years before pursuing a career in football. He is commonly known by the nickname "Kancil" among his teammates. Off the pitch, Alif married in 2024.

== Career statistics ==
=== Club ===
As of 7 July 2026

Club	Season	League			Cup		League Cup		Total	
Club	Season	Division	Apps	Goals	Apps	Goals	Apps	Goals	Apps	Goals
Johor Darul Ta'zim II	2020	Malaysia Premier League	4	0	0	0	0	0	4	0
Johor Darul Ta'zim II	2021	Malaysia Premier League	10	1	0	0	0	0	10	1
Johor Darul Ta'zim II	2022	Malaysia Premier League	13	0	0	0	0	0	13	0
Johor Darul Ta'zim II	2023	MFL Cup	—							
Johor Darul Ta'zim II	2024–25	MFL Cup	—							
Johor Darul Ta'zim II	2025–26	A1 Semi-Pro	23	2	0	0	0	0	23	2
Johor Darul Ta'zim II	Total		50	3	0	0	0	0	50	3
Johor Darul Ta'zim	2024–25	Malaysia Super League	0	0	0	0	2	0	2	0
Johor Darul Ta'zim	Total		0	0	0	0	2	0	2	0
Negeri Sembilan	2026–27	Malaysia Super League	0	0	0	0	0	0	0	0
Negeri Sembilan	Total		0	0	0	0	0	0	0	0
Career total			50	3	0	0	2	0	52	3
