= Umar Hakeem =

Malaysian footballer

Personal information
- Full name: Muhammad Umar Hakeem bin Suhar Redzuan
- Date of birth: 26 August 2002 (age 24)
- Place of birth: Batu Pahat, Malaysia
- Height: 1.70 m (5 ft 7 in)
- Positions: Winger; left-back

Team information
- Current team: Negeri Sembilan
- Number: 33

Youth career
- 2014–2015: NFDP
- 2015–2019: Mokhtar Dahari Academy
- 2020: Johor Darul Ta'zim III

Senior career*
Years	Team	Apps	(Gls)
2021–2025	Johor Darul Ta'zim II	23	(1)
2025–2026	→ Melaka (loan)	16	(1)
2026–	→ Negeri Sembilan (loan)	0	(0)

International career^{‡}
2017–2018	Malaysia U16	5	(0)
2019–2021	Malaysia U19	5	(1)
2021–2024	Malaysia U23	15	(0)
Medal record
Football Men
Representing Malaysia
AFF U-19 Youth Championship
Second place	2019 Vietnam
- * Club domestic league appearances and goals as of 7 July 2026 ‡ National team caps and goals as of 21 August 2025

Muhammad Umar Hakeem bin Suhar Redzuan (born 26 August 2002) is a Malaysian professional footballer who plays as a winger or left-back for Malaysia Super League club Negeri Sembilan.

== Club career ==
=== Early career ===
Umar Hakeem began his football development at the Mokhtar Dahari Academy, where he trained under the National Football Development Programme (NFDP) from 2015 to 2019. At the age of 18, he was signed by Johor Darul Ta'zim and joined JDT III to continue his development with the club.

=== Johor Darul Ta'zim II ===
Umar made his debut for JDT II on 20 September 2020 against Selangor II, coming on as an 86th-minute substitute. During the 2020 season, he made three appearances for JDT II while spending most of the campaign with JDT III in the President's Cup. In 2021, he established himself as a regular in the squad and continued to feature in the Malaysia Premier League through the 2022 season.

During the 2023 and 2024–25 seasons, Umar represented JDT II in the MFL Cup. He helped the team win the 2024–25 MFL Cup, securing the club's first title in the competition.

=== Melaka ===
On 16 July 2025, Umar joined Melaka FC on loan from JDT II ahead of the 2025–26 season.

=== Negeri Sembilan ===
On 7 July 2026, Negeri Sembilan announced the signing of Umar ahead of the 2026–27 season.

== International career ==
=== Youth ===
Umar was part of the 2018 AFC U-16 Championship squad. Umar also became the runner-up 2019 AFF U-18 Youth Championship. He was later selected for the national under-23 team for the 2022 AFC U-23 Asian Cup qualification, 2024 AFC U-23 Asian Cup qualification helping the squad to reach the 2022 final tournament and 2024 final tournament.

== Honours ==
=== International ===
Malaysia U-19

- ASEAN U-19 Boys' Championship: (silver) Silver 2018

== Career statistics ==
=== Club ===
As of 7 July 2026

Club	Season	League			Cup		League Cup		Total	
Club	Season	Division	Apps	Goals	Apps	Goals	Apps	Goals	Apps	Goals
Johor Darul Ta'zim II	2020	Malaysia Premier League	3	0	0	0	0	0	3	0
Johor Darul Ta'zim II	2021	Malaysia Premier League	10	0	0	0	0	0	10	0
Johor Darul Ta'zim II	2022	Malaysia Premier League	10	1	0	0	0	0	10	1
Johor Darul Ta'zim II	2023	MFL Cup	—							
Johor Darul Ta'zim II	2024–25	MFL Cup	—							
Johor Darul Ta'zim II	Total		23	1	0	0	0	0	23	1
Melaka FC (loan)	2025–26	Malaysia Super League	16	1	1	0	3	0	20	1
Melaka FC (loan)	Total		16	1	1	0	3	0	20	1
Negeri Sembilan	2026–27	Malaysia Super League	0	0	0	0	0	0	0	0
Negeri Sembilan	Total		0	0	0	0	0	0	0	0
Career total			39	2	1	0	3	0	43	2
