= Chia Ruo Han =

Malaysian footballer

Personal information
- Full name: Chia Ruo Han
- Date of birth: 1 September 2001 (age 25)
- Place of birth: Kulim, Kedah, Malaysia
- Height: 1.71 m (5 ft 7 in)
- Position: Midfielder

Team information
- Current team: Penang
- Number: 19

Youth career
- 2018–2020: Johor Darul Ta'zim III

Senior career*
Years	Team	Apps	(Gls)
2021–2025	Johor Darul Ta'zim II	14	(9)
2025–	Penang	15	(0)

International career^{‡}
2021	Malaysia U20	0	(0)
- * Club domestic league appearances and goals as of 18 August 2026 ‡ National team caps and goals as of 9 June 2025

Chia Ruo Han (born 1 September 2001) is a Malaysian professional footballer who plays as a midfielder for Malaysia Super League club Penang.

== Club career ==
=== Johor Darul Ta'zim II ===
Chia began his professional career with Johor Darul Ta'zim II F.C. (JDT II), the reserve team of Johor Darul Ta'zim F.C. His performances earned him promotion to the senior team, where he was part of the squad in the Malaysia Super League. Although he had limited appearances for the first team, he was considered a promising talent within JDT setup.

=== Penang ===
In June 2025, Chia Ruo Han joined Penang F.C., a club in the Malaysia Super League. He was assigned the number 19 shirt and brought in to strengthen the club's midfield options for the 2025 season. His signing was officially announced via Penang F.C.’s social media channels.

== International career ==
On 28 August 2021, Chin Ruo Han received his first International callup Malaysia U20 for AFC U-23 Asian Cup qualification on 27 October 2021.

== Honours ==
Penang

- MFL Challenge Cup runner-up: 2026
