= Rafa Gil =

Spanish football manager

Personal information
- Full name: Rafael Gil Sánchez
- Date of birth: 11 October 1975 (age 51)
- Place of birth: Tolox, Spain

Team information
- Current team: Johor Darul Ta'zim II (manager)

Managerial career
- Years: Team
- 2007–2008: Alhaurino
- 2008–2011: Málaga B
- 2010: Málaga (interim)
- 2011–2012: Unión Estepona
- 2012–2013: Saudi Arabia U17
- 2013–2015: Saudi Arabia (assistant)
- 2020–2022: Johor Darul Ta'zim II
- 2022-: Persis Solo

Rafael "Rafa" Gil Sánchez (born 11 October 1975) is a Spanish football manager, currently in charge of Malaysian club Johor Darul Ta'zim II FC.

== Manager career ==
Born in Tolox, Málaga, Andalusia, Gil began his managerial career at local CD Alhaurino in Tercera División, being appointed in January 2007. On 18 June of the following year he was named manager of fellow league team Atlético Malagueño.

On 8 May 2009 Gil renewed his contract for a further year, after being in the promotion places. He missed out promotion in the play-offs, and signed a new two-year deal on 28 May of the following year.

On 2 November 2010 Gil was appointed at the helm of the first team in La Liga, after Jesualdo Ferreira's dismissal. His first professional game in charge occurred five days later, a 0–1 away loss against RCD Espanyol.

Gil subsequently returned to Málaga's B-side, after the appointment of Manuel Pellegrini as first team manager. On 4 July 2011 he rescinded his contract at mutual consent, after again falling short in the play-offs.

In July 2011 Gil was named manager of Unión Estepona CF in the fourth tier. He left the club in April of the following year, taking charge of Saudi Arabia under-17s.

In 2013, Gil was appointed as compatriot Juan Ramón López Caro's assistant in the full squad, leaving his role in 2015. In 2016, he took up a coaching programme in China.

Gil was appointed at Johor Darul Ta'zim II F.C. of Malaysia in November 2019.
