= Fernando Rodríguez (Spanish footballer) =

Spanish footballer

Personal information
- Full name: Fernando Rodríguez Ortega
- Date of birth: 11 May 1987 (age 39)
- Place of birth: Pilas, Spain
- Height: 1.83 m (6 ft 0 in)
- Position: Striker

Youth career
- Sevilla

Senior career*
Years	Team	Apps	(Gls)
2006–2008	Sevilla C	?	(6)
2007–2009	Sevilla B	16	(2)
2008–2009	Sevilla	2	(0)
2009	→ Ontinyent (loan)	8	(0)
2009–2011	Jaén	52	(10)
2011	San Roque Lepe	19	(8)
2011–2012	Ceuta	34	(3)
2012–2013	Lucena	37	(12)
2013–2014	Cartagena	36	(18)
2014–2015	Hércules	37	(5)
2015–2016	Reus	27	(3)
2016	Cartagena	11	(2)
2017	Ceres–Negros	0	(0)
2018	Mitra Kukar	30	(15)
2019	Kedah Darul Aman	22	(9)
2020–2022	Johor Darul Ta'zim	8	(3)
2020–2022	Johor Darul Ta'zim II	26	(24)
2022–2023	Persis Solo	40	(17)
2024–2025	Jaén	47	(10)
2025	Ciudad Torredonjimeno	0	(0)
- * Club domestic league appearances and goals as of 10 May 2025

Fernando Rodríguez Ortega (born 11 May 1987) is a Spanish professional footballer who plays as a striker.

== Club career ==
Born in Pilas, Province of Seville, Rodríguez spent the vast majority of his career in the Spanish lower leagues. His professional input in his country consisted of two La Liga matches with Sevilla, as well as 16 in the Segunda División with their reserves. He made his debut in the former competition on 19 October 2008, coming on as a late substitute for Lautaro Acosta in a 1–0 away win against Almería where he was also booked.

Rodríguez scored a career-best 18 goals in the 2013–14 season (adding two in the Copa del Rey) to help Cartagena to qualify for the promotion play-offs of Segunda División B, where they eventually fell short. In 2016, with the team still in that league, he returned for a second spell.

In January 2017, the 29-year-old Rodríguez moved abroad for the first time, signing with Ceres–Negros of the Philippines Football League and being officially announced on the 17th. One year later, he switched to the Liga 1 with Mitra Kukar.

On 28 November 2018, Rodríguez joined Malaysia Super League club Kedah Darul Aman. On 8 January 2020 he joined Johor Darul Ta'zim II, a reserve team who competed in the country's second tier.

In November 2023, Rodríguez returned to Real Jaén (now in the Tercera Federación) from Indonesian top-flight Persis Solo, with the deal being effective when the winter transfer window opened.

== Career statistics ==
As of 11 February 2024

Club	Season	League			Cup		Continental		Other		Total	
Club	Season	Division	Apps	Goals	Apps	Goals	Apps	Goals	Apps	Goals	Apps	Goals
Sevilla B	2007–08	La Liga	4	1	—		—		—		4	1
Sevilla B	2008–09	Segunda División	12	1	—		—		—		12	1
Sevilla B	Total		16	2	—		—		—		16	2
Sevilla	2008–09	La Liga	2	0	0	0	2 (Note: Appearances in UEFA Cup)	0	0	0	4	0
Ontinyent (loan)	2008–09	Segunda División B	8	0	—		—		—		8	0
Jaén	2009–10	Segunda División B	35	10	—		—		4 (Note: Appearance in Segunda División B play-offs)	0	39	10
Jaén	2010–11	Segunda División B	17	0	1	0	—		—		18	0
Jaén	Total		52	10	1	0	—		4	0	57	10
San Roque Lepe	2010–11	Segunda División B	19	8	0	0	—		—		19	8
Ceuta	2011–12	Segunda División B	34	3	1	0	—		—		35	3
Lucena	2012–13	Segunda División B	37	12	2	1	—		2	0	41	13
Cartagena	2013–14	Segunda División B	36	18	5	2	—		2	0	43	20
Hércules	2014–15	Segunda División B	37	5	1	1	—		3	0	41	6
Reus	2015–16	Segunda División B	27	3	5	1	—		1	0	33	4
Cartagena	2016–17	Segunda División B	11	2	1	0	—		—		12	2
Ceres-Negros	2017	Philippines Football League	0	0	1	0	12 (Note: Appearances in Asian Cup)	6	0	0	13	6
Mitra Kukar	2018	Liga 1	30	15	0	0	—		1 (Note: Appearance in Piala Presiden)	2	31	17
Kedah	2019	Malaysia Super League	22	9	1	0	—		—		23	9
Johor Darul Ta'zim	2020	Malaysia Super League	1	1	0	0	0	0	—		1	1
Johor Darul Ta'zim	2021	Malaysia Super League	4	1	0	0	0	0	—		4	1
Johor Darul Ta'zim	2022	Malaysia Super League	3	1	0	0	0	0	—		3	1
Johor Darul Ta'zim	Total		8	3	0	0	0	0	0	0	8	3
Persis Solo	2022–23	Liga 1	25	10	—		—		—		25	10
Persis Solo	2023–24	Liga 1	15	7	—		—		—		15	7
Persis Solo	Total		40	17	0	0	0	0	0	0	40	17
Jaén	2023–24	Tercera Federación	6	0	—		—		—		6	0
Career total			385	107	18	5	14	6	13	2	430	120

== Honours ==
Kedah

- Malaysia FA Cup: 2019
- Malaysia Cup runner-up: 2019

Johor Darul Ta'zim

- Malaysia Super League: 2020, 2021
- Piala Sumbangsih: 2021
