= Adib Zainudin =

Malaysian footballer

Personal information
- Full name: Muhamad Adib bin Zainudin
- Date of birth: 15 February 1995 (age 31)
- Place of birth: Mersing, Johor, Malaysia
- Height: 1.81 m (5 ft 11 1/2 in)
- Position: Centre-back

Team information
- Current team: PT Athletic
- Number: 4

Youth career
- 2013: Johor U-21
- 2014: Harimau Muda C

Senior career*
Years	Team	Apps	(Gls)
2015–2017	UiTM FC	39	(0)
2017	→ Felcra FC (loan)	15	(2)
2018–2021	Johor Darul Ta'zim II	35	(0)
2022–2023	Terengganu	9	(0)
2024–	PT Athletic	0	(0)

International career^{‡}
2016–2018	Malaysia U23	22	(1)
Medal record
Malaysia under-23
Sea Games
Silver medal – second place	Sea Games 2017	Football
- * Club domestic league appearances and goals ‡ National team caps and goals as of 20 August 2018

Muhammad Adib bin Zainudin (born 15 February 1995) is a Malaysian professional footballer who currently plays for Malaysia A1 Semi-Pro League club PT Athletic. Adib plays mainly as a centre-back. Adib was promoted as the captain of the Malaysia U-23 national team in 2016 after the former captain Faris Shah Rosli got a long-term injury. He was part of the national team that qualified for the 2018 AFC U-23 Championship in China.

Born and raised in Mersing, Johor, Adib started his football career when he went to Sekolah Sukan Tunku Mahkota Ismail in Johor. In 2013, he played for Johor U-21 team before moved to Harimau Muda C on the following year.

In December 2014, Adib signed a contract with Shah Alam based club, UiTM FC. It was a good move as UiTM allowed him to pursue his degree in Sports science, although with a below-market salary offer. He spent two seasons with the club before he was loaned out to Felcra FC at the start of 2017 season. He wanted the loan move as the club offered him a better salary.

Adib made 6 appearances and 1 goal during 2017 Southeast Asian Games in Kuala Lumpur. The goal made during 4th match of the group stage against Laos which ended Malaysia won by 3–1.

== Career statistics ==
=== Club ===
As of match played 8 October 2017.

Club performance			League		Cup		League Cup		Continental		Total	
Season	Club	League	Apps	Goals	Apps	Goals	Apps	Goals	Apps	Goals	Apps	Goals
2015	UiTM FC	Malaysia Premier League	21	0	1	0	–		–		22	0
2016	UiTM FC	Malaysia Premier League	18	0	1	0	–		–		19	0
Total			39	0	2	0	0	0	0	0	41	0
2017	Felcra FC (loan)	FAM League	15	2	2	0	–		–		17	2
2018	Johor Darul Ta'zim II	Malaysia Premier League	0	0	0	0	–		–		0	0
2019	Johor Darul Ta'zim II	Malaysia Premier League	14	0	0	0	–		–		14	0
2020	Johor Darul Ta'zim II	Malaysia Premier League	8	0	–		–		–		8	0
2021	Johor Darul Ta'zim II	Malaysia Premier League	13	0	–		–		–		13	0
Total			0	0	0	0	0	0	0	0	0	0
2022	Terengganu	Malaysia Super League	5	0	1	0	2	0	–		8	0
2023	Terengganu	Malaysia Super League	0	0	0	0	–		–		0	0
Total			0	0	0	0	0	0	0	0	0	0
Career total			54	2	4	0	0	0	0	0	58	2

== Honours ==
Terengganu FC

- Malaysia FA Cup runner-up: 2022
- Malaysia Charity Shield runner-up: 2023
- Malaysia Cup runner-up: 2023

=== International ===
Malaysia U-23

- Southeast Asian Games

(silver) Silver Medal: 2017
