= Nico Fernández =

Argentine footballer (born 1986)

Personal information
- Full name: Nicolás Alberto Fernández
- Date of birth: 17 November 1986 (age 39)
- Place of birth: Mar del Plata, Argentina
- Height: 1.75 m (5 ft 9 in)
- Position: Attacking midfielder

Youth career
- Lanús

Senior career*
Years	Team	Apps	(Gls)
2005–2006	Deportivo Norte		
2006–2007	Aldosivi	0	(0)
2007	Deportivo Armenio	5	(6)
2007–2008	Olimpo	0	(3)
2008	Bella Vista	1	(2)
2008–2009	Mallorca B	27	(20)
2009–2010	Pinatar	22	(13)
2010–2011	Jumilla	19	(20)
2011	Pinatar	9	(16)
2011–2012	Lorca Atlético	26	(22)
2012–2014	La Hoya Lorca	61	(55)
2014–2016	Asteras Tripolis	51	(41)
2017–2018	Johor Darul Ta'zim II		
2018	→Johor Darul Ta'zim (loan)		
- * Club domestic league appearances and goals as of 23:03, 17 August 2021 (UTC)

Nicolás "Nico" Alberto Fernández (born 17 November 1986), sometimes known as just Nico, is an Argentine footballer who plays for Malaysian club Johor Darul Ta'zim II as an attacking midfielder.

== Club career ==
Fernández was born in Temperley, Buenos Aires, but for family reasons at age of 12 he moved to Mar del Plata. Thanks to his good performance with Lanús, Deportivo Norte and Olimpo youth teams, he attracts the attention of FIFA agent Alejandro Camano with strong ties with Spanish clubs, who brought him to RCD Mallorca, where those years, a lot of Argentinian playing for the first team like Guillermo Pereyra, Jonas Gutierrez, Ariel Ibagaza and Germán Lux.

Fernández met for the first time what is living in another country. He played in a club with an infrastructure of top clubs in Argentina and the economic instability in his country made him doubt about his remaining in Argentina. In 2011, he signed to Lorca Atlético CF, a small town only 40 minutes from Murcia. After a year there, he signed for La Hoya Lorca CF.

After the 2013–14 season, the first for La Hoya Lorca in Segunda División B, the moment to restructure the squad arrives, as Fernandez decided to move to Greece, playing for Asteras Tripolis. Fernandez was the first to be announced after the rise of the club in Segunda División B, and during that season played 37 matches between league and playoffs appearing in the starting lineup 27 times scoring 6 goals.

On 1 July 2014, Fernández signed a three years' contract with Greek Super League Greece side Asteras Tripolis. After 2,5 years with the club, they accepted the offer of the Malaysia Premier League club Johor Darul Ta'zim II F.C. He left the club having 64 appearances (9 goals, 7 assists) in all competitions.
