= 2024–25 Johor Darul Ta'zim F.C. season =

Johor Darul Ta'zim
2024–25 season
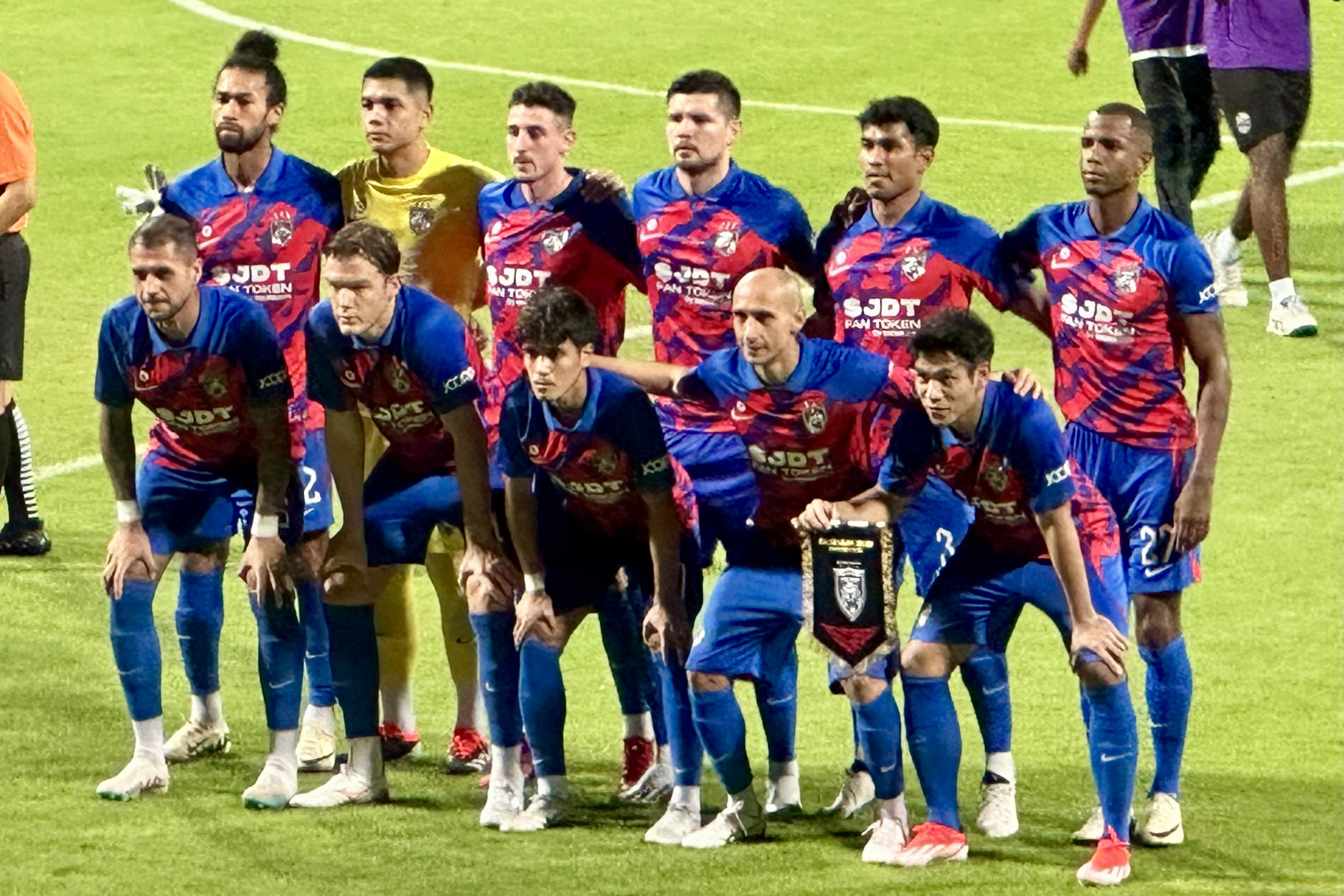
- Match between Johor Darul Ta'zim and Lion City Sailors
- Chairman: Tunku Tun Aminah Sultan Ibrahim
- Head Coach: Héctor Bidoglio
- Stadium: Sultan Ibrahim Stadium
- Super League: 1st
- Charity Shield: Winners
- FA Cup: Winners
- Malaysia Cup: Winners
- Champions League Elite: Round of 16
- Top goalscorer: League: Bérgson (16); All: Bérgson (19)
- Biggest win: 9–0 vs Kelantan Darul Naim (H), 10 April 2025, Super League
- Biggest defeat: 1–3 vs Gwangju (A), 22 October 2024, Champions League
Home colours	Away colours	Third colours

The 2024–25 season is Johor Darul Ta'zim Football Club's 51st season in club history and 10th season in the Malaysia Super League after rebranding their name from Johor FC. The club will also participate in the inaugural 2024–25 AFC Champions League Elite.

== Review ==

Johor Darul Ta'zim's usual starting lineup in Champions League

=== Pre-season ===
The 2024–25 Malaysia Super League season will be the first season to be played to have a two-year schedule since the 2007–08 Malaysia Super League season. Johor Darul Ta'zim started off their season playing a couple of pre-seasons friendlies against Thailand club, Police Tero and Chonburi at the Sultan Ibrahim Stadium before travelling to Singapore to face Lion City Sailors at the Bishan Stadium where new signings Nicolao Dumitru and Romel Morales scored in a 2–1 win. They then play the return fixture at the Sultan Ibrahim Stadium on 8 April 2024 winning 4–0

Johor Darul Ta'zim than fly off to Spain on 14 April in their 'Tour of Spain' pre-season friendlies where the club will be staying at the Melia Villaitana Football Centre. On 17 April, Johor Darul Ta'zim played their first pre-season friendly match against third tier Primera Federación club, Real Murcia at the Estadio Nueva Condomina in which Johor Darul Ta'zim won 3–0 with Arif Aiman, two new signings Jalil Elías and Francisco Geraldes scoring in the match. On the next day, Johor Darul Ta'zim played against fourth tier Segunda Federación club, La Nucía at the Estadi Olímpic Camilo Canoin which the players that played the day before was rested. Johor Darul Ta'zim conceded the first goal to the opponent before Óscar Arribas and Nicolao Dumitru sealed the 3–1 win for the club. On 23 April, They face fifth tier Tercera Federación side, Castellonense however, the match got cancelled and instead they face amateur club, Club Costa City which is owned by Atletico Madrid star player, Saúl Ñíguez where they hammered 7–0 with Ramadhan Saifuillah scoring a hat-trick in the match. On 24 April, Johor Darul Ta'zim played their fourth pre-season match against third tier Primera Federación club Alcoyano in which they won 2–1. The next day, Johor Darul Ta'zim suffered to their first pre-season 2–0 defeat to second tier Segunda División club Eldense. The club then played their final pre-season friendly on 29 April against Benidorm winning them 2–1.

=== Transfer ===
With long-term serving player Aidil Zafuan, S. Kunanlan and Diogo announcing their retirement from football and Aidil joining the backroom staff as Johor Darul Ta'zim assistant coach, the club also released several players which is Hazwan Bakri, Leandro Velázquez, and Takahiro Kunimoto. The players who went on loan during the 2023 season which is Azrif Nasrulhaq, Izham Tarmizi and Syazwan Andik all permanently left JDT for another Malaysia Super League club Sri Pahang. Johor Darul Ta'zim also loaned out Haziq Nadzli to Perak, Syamer Kutty Abba to Penang, Syafiq Ahmad to Kedah Darul Aman and both winger duo, Akhyar Rashid and Safawi Rasid to Terengganu. JDT announced the return of Heberty on a free transfer after joining the club on loan in the 2023 season and also Junior Eldstål who left the club on loan for Indonesian club, Dewa United. The club also bought in Romel Morales, Jalil Elías, Francisco Geraldes, Nicolao Dumitru and Murilo ahead of the 2024–25 season. JDT also signed additional players like Azam Azmi, Manuel Hidalgo, both brothers Ryan Lambert and Declan Lambert in which they were immediately loaned out to their former club where they will stay for the 2024–25 season. During the mid season transfer, JDT signed a couple of players in preparation for the 2024–25 AFC Champions League Elite, the club signed Park Jun-heong, Enzo Lombardo, Jorge Obregón and notably a few Spanish footballer like Eddy Israfilov, Christian Abad, Iker Undabarrena, Andoni Zubiaurre and former Real Madrid player Jesé. JDT then announced the release of Fernando Forestieri and also Nicolao Dumitru who has yet to make an appearance for the club since joining in April. The club then loaned out Endrick to V.League 1 club Ho Chi Minh City, Jalil Elías to Vélez Sarsfield, Francisco Geraldes to CD Eldense and Ramadhan Saifullah to Kuching City.

=== Season review ===
On 10 May 2024, Johor Darul Ta'zim will faced rival Selangor in the 2024 Piala Sumbangsih but was awarded the 3–0 win regarding the controversies arousing Selangor player Faisal Halim. On 22 June, Heberty become the first player in the season to score a hat-trick for the club in a 3–0 win over Penang. On 24 August, JDT thrash Selangor 6–1 in the 2024 Malaysia FA Cup final where Juan Muñiz scored a hat-trick in the match to win the cup. During the match against Kelantan Darul Naim on 22 September, World famous YouTuber, IShowSpeed make a visit to the Sultan Ibrahim Stadium in which Bergson scored a hat-trick during the game in a 6–1 win.

== Squad ==
=== Johor Darul Ta'zim ===
As of 19 April 2024

Squad No.	Name	Nationality	Date of birth (age)	Previous club	Contract since	Contract end
Goalkeepers
1	Farizal Marlias	(Malaysia)	29 June 1986 (age 40)	(Malaysia) Selangor	2015	2025
12	Christian Abad Amat	(Malaysia) (Spain)	5 August 2006 (age 20)	(Spain) Elche CF (S2)	2024	2025
16	Syihan Hazmi	(Malaysia)	26 February 1996 (age 30)	(Malaysia) Negeri Sembilan	2023	2025
29	Izham Tarmizi	(Malaysia)	24 April 1991 (age 35)	(Malaysia) Pahang	2024	2025
47	Zulhilmi Sharani	(Malaysia)	4 May 2004 (age 22)	(Malaysia) Johor Darul Ta'zim II	2019	2025
58	Andoni Zubiaurre (Note: Zubiaurre registered for ACL Elite only)	(Spain)	4 December 1996 (age 29)	(Spain) CD Eldense (S2)	2024	2025
Defenders
2	Matthew Davies	(Malaysia) (Australia)	7 February 1995 (age 31)	(Malaysia) Pahang	2020	2025
3	Shahrul Saad	(Malaysia)	8 July 1993 (age 33)	(Malaysia) Perak	2021	2025
5	Jordi Amat	(Indonesia) (Spain)	21 March 1992 (age 34)	(Belgium) Eupen (B1)	2022	2025
11	Murilo (Note: Murilo registered for ACL Elite only after 2nd transfer window)	(Brazil)	2 December 1995 (age 30)	(Finland) SJK Seinäjoki (F1)	2024	2025
13	Park Jun-heong	(South Korea)	25 January 1993 (age 33)	(Thailand) Ratchaburi (T1)	2024	2025
14	Shane Lowry (Note: Lowry registered for ACL Elite only after 2nd transfer window)	(Australia) (Republic of Ireland)	12 June 1989 (age 37)	(Qatar) Al Ahli (Q1)	2021	2025
15	Feroz Baharudin	(Malaysia)	2 April 2000 (age 26)	(Malaysia) Johor Darul Ta'zim II	2021	2025
22	La'Vere Corbin-Ong	(Malaysia) (Canada)	21 April 1991 (age 35)	(Netherlands) Go Ahead Eagles (N1)	2018	2025
25	Junior Eldstål	(Malaysia) (England) (Sweden)	16 September 1991 (age 35)	(Indonesia) Dewa United (I1)	2022	2025
27	Álvaro González (Note: Álvaro registered for ACL Elite only)	(Spain)	8 January 1990 (age 36)	(Saudi Arabia) Al Qadsiah FC (S1)	2025	2025
91	Syahmi Safari	(Malaysia)	5 February 1998 (age 28)	(Malaysia) Selangor	2022	2025
Midfielders
4	Afiq Fazail	(Malaysia)	29 September 1994 (age 32)	(Malaysia) Harimau Muda B	2015	2024
6	Hong Wan	(Malaysia) (England)	17 August 2000 (age 26)	(England) Wolverhampton Wanderers U23	2021	2025
7	Enzo Lombardo	(France)	16 April 1997 (age 29)	(Spain) SD Huesca (S2)	2024	2025
8	Safiq Rahim	(Malaysia)	5 July 1987 (age 39)	(Malaysia) Melaka United	2021	2025
10	Jonathan Viera (Note: Viera registered for ACL Elite only)	(Spain)	21 October 1989 (age 37)	(United Arab Emirates) Khor Fakkan Club (U1)	2025	2025
17	Roque Mesa (Note: Mesa registered for ACL Elite only)	(Spain)	7 June 1989 (age 37)	(Spain) Sporting de Gijón (S2)	2025	2025
18	Iker Undabarrena	(Spain)	18 May 1995 (age 31)	(Spain) CD Leganés (S2)	2024	2025
21	Nazmi Faiz	(Malaysia)	16 August 1994 (age 32)	(Malaysia) Johor Darul Ta'zim II	2017	2024
23	Eddy Pascual	(Azerbaijan) (Spain)	2 August 1992 (age 34)	(Azerbaijan) Neftçi PFK (A1)	2024	2025
26	Mohamadou Sumareh	(Malaysia) (The Gambia)	20 September 1994 (age 32)	(Thailand) Police Tero (T1)	2021	2023
30	Natxo Insa	(Malaysia) (Spain)	9 June 1986 (age 40)	(Spain) Levante UD (S1)	2017	2024
41	Aysar Hadi	(Malaysia)	4 September 2003 (age 23)	(Malaysia) Johor Darul Ta'zim II	2021	2025
81	Daryl Sham	(Malaysia) (Philippines)	30 November 2002 (age 23)	(Malaysia) Johor Darul Ta'zim II	2022	2025
87	Anselmo Moraes (Note: Anselmo registered for ACL Elite only)	(Brazil)	20 February 1989 (age 37)	(Saudi Arabia) Al Wehda FC (S1)	2025	2025
Strikers
9	Bergson da Silva	(Brazil)	9 February 1991 (age 35)	(Brazil) Fortaleza (B1)	2021	2025
19	Romel Morales	(Malaysia) (Colombia)	23 August 1997 (age 29)	(Malaysia) Kuala Lumpur City	2024	2025
20	Juan Muñiz	(Spain)	14 March 1992 (age 34)	(Greece) Atromitos (G1)	2023	2025
24	Óscar Arribas	(Philippines) (Spain)	20 October 1998 (age 28)	(Spain) FC Cartagena (S2)	2023	2026
33	Jesé	(Spain)	26 February 1993 (age 33)	(Brazil) Coritiba (B2)	2024	2025
37	Heberty	(Brazil)	29 August 1988 (age 38)	(Thailand) Bangkok United (T1)	2023	2025
39	Gabriel Nistelrooy	(Malaysia)	25 April 2000 (age 26)	(Malaysia) Johor Darul Ta'zim II	2020	2025
42	Arif Aiman	(Malaysia)	4 May 2002 (age 24)	(Malaysia) Johor Darul Ta'zim III	2020	2025
77	Samu Castillejo (Note: Castillejo registered for ACL Elite only)	(Spain)	18 January 1995 (age 31)	(Spain) Valencia CF (S1)	2025	2025
99	Jorge Obregón	(Colombia)	29 March 1997 (age 29)	(Croatia) HNK Rijeka (C1)	2024	2025
On loan
	Jalil Elías	(Syria) (Argentina)	25 April 1996 (age 30)	(Argentina) San Lorenzo (A1)	2024	2025
10	Francisco Geraldes	(Portugal)	18 April 1995 (age 31)	(United Arab Emirates) Baniyas Club (U1)	2024	2025
16	Danial Amier	(Malaysia)	27 March 1997 (age 29)	(Malaysia) FELDA United	2021	2025
17	Ramadhan Saifullah	(Malaysia)	9 December 2000 (age 25)	(Malaysia) Johor Darul Ta'zim III	2020	2025
23	Endrick	(Malaysia) (Brazil)	7 March 1995 (age 31)	(Malaysia) Penang	2022	2025
27	Nicolao Dumitru	(Italy) (Romania) (Sweden) (Brazil)	12 October 1991 (age 35)	(Thailand) Buriram United (T1)	2024	2025
28	Syafiq Ahmad	(Malaysia)	28 June 1995 (age 31)	(Malaysia) Kedah Darul Aman	2018	2026
29	Safawi Rasid	(Malaysia)	5 March 1997 (age 29)	(Thailand) Ratchaburi (T1)	2017	2026
33	Daniel Ting	(Malaysia) (England)	1 December 1992 (age 33)	(Malaysia) Sabah	2022	2022
77	Syamer Kutty Abba	(Malaysia)	1 October 1997 (age 29)	(Portugal) Vilaverdense (P1)	2018	2025
	Azam Azmi	(Malaysia)	12 February 2001 (age 25)	(Malaysia) Terengganu	2024	2026
	Declan Lambert	(Malaysia) (England)	21 September 1998 (age 28)	(Malaysia) Kuala Lumpur City	2024	2026
	Ryan Lambert	(Malaysia) (England)	21 September 1998 (age 28)	(Malaysia) Kuala Lumpur City	2024	2025
	Hector Hevel	(Malaysia) (Netherlands)	15 May 1996 (age 30)	(Portugal) Portimonense	2025	2025
	Manuel Hidalgo	(Argentina)	3 May 1999 (age 27)	(Malaysia) Kedah Darul Aman	2024	2026
Left during the season
19	Akhyar Rashid	(Malaysia)	1 May 1999 (age 27)	(Malaysia) Kedah Darul Aman	2019	2026
26	Haziq Nadzli	(Malaysia)	6 January 1998 (age 28)	(Malaysia) PDRM	2017	2026
45	Fernando Forestieri	(Argentina) (Italy)	15 January 1990 (age 36)	(Italy) Udinese (I1)	2022	2025
92	Lévy Madinda	(Gabon)	22 June 1992 (age 34)	(Indonesia) Persib Bandung (I1)	2022	2025
	Moussa Sidibe	(Mali) (Spain)	21 November 1994 (age 31)	(Thailand) Ratchaburi (T1)	2022	

=== Johor Darul Ta'zim II ===
As of 19 April 2024

Squad no.	Name	Nationality	Date of birth (age)	Previous club	Contract since	Contract end
Goalkeepers
1	Haziq Aiman	(Malaysia)	19 January 2005 (age 21)	(Malaysia) Johor Darul Ta'zim III	2024	2025
22	Zulhilmi Sharani	(Malaysia)	4 May 2004 (age 22)	(Malaysia) Johor Darul Ta'zim II	2019	2025
25	Hafiz Azizi	(Malaysia)	5 August 2001 (age 25)	(Malaysia) Johor Darul Ta'zim III	2019	2025
34	El Aqil	(Malaysia)		(Malaysia) Johor Darul Ta'zim III	2024	2025
	Harith Bisyar	(Malaysia)		(Malaysia) Johor Darul Ta'zim III	2021	
	Riezman Irfan	(Malaysia)		(Malaysia) Johor Darul Ta'zim III	2021	
Defenders
2	Dinesh Vikneswaran	(Malaysia)		(Malaysia)	2024	2025
3	Firdaus Ramli	(Malaysia)	10 March 2002 (age 24)	(Malaysia) Johor Darul Ta'zim III	2021	2025
4	Shazriman Hasnul	(Malaysia)		(Malaysia) Johor Darul Ta'zim III	2024	2025
5	Syahrul Fazly	(Malaysia)	20 February 2001 (age 25)	(Malaysia) Johor Darul Ta'zim III	2021	2025
8	Umar Hakeem	(Malaysia)	26 August 2002 (age 24)	(Malaysia) Johor Darul Ta'zim III	2020	2025
21	Marwan Abdul Rahman	(Malaysia)	2 January 2003 (age 23)	(Malaysia) Johor Darul Ta'zim III	2021	2025
23	Haziq Ridhwan	(Malaysia)		(Malaysia) Johor Darul Ta'zim III	2024	2025
24	Adam Daniel	(Malaysia)	2 May 2004 (age 22)	(Malaysia) Johor Darul Ta'zim III	2021	2025
26	Naqiu Aiman	(Malaysia)		(Malaysia) Johor Darul Ta'zim III	2020	2025
27	Fakrul Haikal	(Malaysia)		(Malaysia) Johor Darul Ta'zim III	2020	2025
28	Adam Farhan	(Malaysia)	3 April 2004 (age 22)	(Malaysia) Johor Darul Ta'zim III	2020	2025
29	Syukur Fariz	(Malaysia)	1 May 2003 (age 23)	(Malaysia) Johor Darul Ta'zim III	2021	2025
30	Danish Hakimi	(Malaysia)		(Malaysia) Johor Darul Ta'zim III	2021	2025
	Ali Imran	(Malaysia)	30 May 2002 (age 24)	(Malaysia) Johor Darul Ta'zim III	2021	
Midfielders
6	Rafiefikri Rosman	(Malaysia)	13 June 2002 (age 24)	(Malaysia) Johor Darul Ta'zim III	2020	2025
7	Najmuddin Akmal	(Malaysia)	11 January 2003 (age 23)	(Malaysia) Johor Darul Ta'zim III	2022	2025
10	Aiman Danish Azli	(Malaysia)	7 March 2003 (age 23)	(Malaysia) Johor Darul Ta'zim III	2021	2025
11	Danie Asyraf	(Malaysia)		(Malaysia) Johor Darul Ta'zim III	2021	2025
12	Ziad El Basheer	(Malaysia)	24 December 2003 (age 22)	(Malaysia) Johor Darul Ta'zim III	2021	2025
13	Aysar Hadi	(Malaysia)	4 September 2003 (age 23)	(Malaysia) Johor Darul Ta'zim III	2021	2025
14	Chia Rou Han	(Malaysia)	1 September 2001 (age 25)	(Malaysia) Johor Darul Ta'zim III	2021	2025
16	Ahmad Irfan	(Malaysia)		(Malaysia) Johor Darul Ta'zim III	2021	2025
17	Alif Mutalib	(Malaysia)	16 January 2002 (age 24)	(Malaysia) Johor Darul Ta'zim III	2020	2025
18	Daryl Sham	(Malaysia)	30 November 2002 (age 23)	(Malaysia) Johor Darul Ta'zim III	2022	2025
19	Aznil Hafiz	(Malaysia)		(Malaysia) Johor Darul Ta'zim III	2021	2025
20	Danish Zahir	(Malaysia)		(Malaysia) Johor Darul Ta'zim III	2024	2025
32	Alif Ahmad	(Malaysia)		(Malaysia) Johor Darul Ta'zim III	2024	2025
35	Danish Irham	(Malaysia)		(Malaysia) Johor Darul Ta'zim III	2024	2025
	Harif Mustaqim Hamdan	(Malaysia)		(Malaysia) Johor Darul Ta'zim III	2021	
Forwards
9	Gabriel Nistelrooy	(Malaysia)	25 April 2000 (age 26)	(Malaysia) Johor Darul Ta'zim II	2020	2025
33	Danish Syamer Tajiuddin	(Malaysia)		(Malaysia) Negeri Sembilan II	2024	2025
??	Awang Muhammad Faiz Hazziq	(Malaysia)	6 March 1999 (age 27)	(Malaysia) Johor Darul Ta'zim III	2020	
Players who are loan to other clubs
15	Fergus Tierney	(Malaysia) (Scotland)	19 March 2003 (age 23)	(Malaysia) Johor Darul Ta'zim III	2020	
Players who had left other clubs during the season

== Coaching staff ==
Position	Name
CEO	(Spain) Luis García
COO	(Australia) Alistair Edwards
Sporting Director	(Argentina) Martín Prest
Technical Director	(Australia) Alistair Edwards
Manager	(Argentina) (Venezuela) Héctor Bidoglio
Asst. Manager	(Argentina) Marcelo Baamonde
Asst. Manager	(Argentina) (Spain) Ramiro Gonzalez
Asst. Manager	(Malaysia) Aidil Zafuan
Asst. Manager	(Malaysia) Hamzani Omar
Goalkeeper coach	(Spain) Jon Elorza
Fitness coaches	(Spain) Jorge Álvarez
Fitness coaches	(Argentina) Gasparini Alexis Cruz

== Transfers and contracts ==
=== In ===
Preseason

Position	Player	Transferred from	Ref
GK	(Malaysia) Izham Tarmizi	(Malaysia) Sri Pahang	Free (Note: Izham Tarmizi returns to JDT before transfer window end.)
DF	(Brazil) Murilo	(Finland) SJK Seinäjoki (Veikkausliiga)	Free
DF	(Malaysia) Azam Azmi	(Malaysia) Terengganu	Undisclosed (Note: Azam Azmi returns to Terengganu on loan for one season.)
DF	(Malaysia) (England) Declan Lambert	(Malaysia) Kuala Lumpur City	Free (Note: Declan Lambert returns to Kuala Lumpur City on loan for one season.)
MF	(Malaysia) (England) Ryan Lambert	(Malaysia) Kuala Lumpur City	Free (Note: Ryan Lambert returns to Kuala Lumpur City on loan for one season.)
MF	(Syria) (Argentina) Jalil Elías	(Argentina) San Lorenzo (Argentine Primera División)	Free
MF	(Portugal) Francisco Geraldes	(United Arab Emirates) Baniyas Club (UAE Pro League)	Free
MF	(Argentina) Manuel Hidalgo	(Malaysia) Kedah Darul Aman	Free (Note: Manuel Hidalgo sent on loan to Pahang for one season.)
FW	(Malaysia) (Colombia) Romel Morales	(Malaysia) Kuala Lumpur City	Free
FW	(Italy) (Romania) (Sweden) (Brazil) Nicolao Dumitru	(Thailand) Buriram United (Thai League 1)	Free
FW	(Brazil) Heberty	(Thailand) Bangkok United (Thai League 1)	Free (Note: Heberty returns to JDT for free after end of loan and expiry of contract with Bangkok United.)

Mid-season

Position	Player	Transferred from	Ref
GK	(Spain) (Malaysia) Christian Abad Amat	(Spain) Elche Youth Team (Segunda División)	Undisclosed
GK	(Spain) Andoni Zubiaurre	(Spain) CD Eldense (Segunda División)	Free
DF	(South Korea) Park Jun-heong	(Thailand) Ratchaburi (Thai League 1)	Free
DF	(Spain) Álvaro González	(Saudi Arabia) Al Qadsiah FC (Saudi Pro League)	Free
MF	(Brazil) Anselmo Moraes	(Saudi Arabia) Al Wehda FC (Saudi Pro League)	Free
MF	(Spain) Jonathan Viera	(United Arab Emirates) Khor Fakkan Club (UAE Pro League)	Free
MF	(France) Enzo Lombardo	(Spain) Huesca (Segunda División)	Free
MF	(Spain) Roque Mesa	(Spain) Sporting de Gijón (Segunda División)	Free
MF	(Spain) Iker Undabarrena	(Spain) CD Leganés (Segunda División)	Free
MF	(Azerbaijan) (Spain) Eddy Israfilov	Neftçi (Azerbaijan Premier League)	Free
FW	(Colombia) Jorge Obregón	(Croatia) HNK Rijeka (Supersport HNL)	Free
FW	(Spain) Jesé	(Brazil) Coritiba (Campeonato Brasileiro Série B)	Free
FW	(Spain) Samu Castillejo	Free Agent	Free

Postseason

Position	Player	Transferred from	Ref
MF	(Malaysia) (Netherlands) Hector Hevel	(Portugal) Portimonense	Free

=== Loan In / Return ===
Preseason

Position	Player	Transferred from	Ref
GK	(Malaysia) Izham Tarmizi	(Malaysia) Sri Pahang	Loan Return
DF	(Malaysia) Syazwan Andik	(Malaysia) Sri Pahang	Loan Return
DF	(Malaysia) Azrif Nasrulhaq	(Malaysia) Sri Pahang	Loan Return
DF	(Malaysia) (England) Daniel Ting	(Malaysia) Sabah	Loan Return
MF	(Malaysia) (Kosovo) Liridon Krasniqi	(Malaysia) Terengganu	Loan Return
MF	(Malaysia) Junior Eldstål	(Indonesia) Dewa United (Liga 1)	Loan Return

Mid-season

Position	Player	Transferred from	Ref
MF	(Malaysia) (Scotland) Fergus Tierney	(Thailand) Chonburi (Thai League 2)	Loan Return (Note: Fergus Tierney loan cut short after 1st leg of the Thai League 2.)
MF	(Portugal) Francisco Geraldes	(Spain) CD Eldense (Segunda División)	Loan Return (Note: Francisco Geraldes's loan to CD Eldense is cut short in Feb 2025)

=== Out ===
Preseason

Position	Player	Transferred To	Ref
GK	(Malaysia) Izham Tarmizi	(Malaysia) Sri Pahang	Free (Note: Izham Tarmizi returns to JDT before transfer window end.)
DF	(Malaysia) Azrif Nasrulhaq	(Malaysia) Sri Pahang	Free
DF	(Malaysia) Syazwan Andik	(Malaysia) Sri Pahang	Free
DF	(Malaysia) Adam Nor Azlin	(Malaysia) Sri Pahang	Free
DF	(Malaysia) Aidil Zafuan	Retired	N.A.
DF	(Malaysia) S. Kunanlan	Retired	N.A.
MF	(Malaysia) (Argentina) Leandro Velázquez	Retired	N.A.
MF	(Malaysia) (Kosovo) Liridon Krasniqi	(Switzerland) FC Schaffhausen II (2. Liga Interregional)	Free agent
MF	(Japan) Takahiro Kunimoto	Liaoning Tieren (China League One)	Free
FW	(Malaysia) Hazwan Bakri	(Malaysia) Kuching City	Free
FW	(Brazil) Diogo	Retired	N.A.
FW	(Mali) (Spain) Moussa Sidibé	(Indonesia) Persis Solo (Liga 1)	Free

Mid-season

Position	Player	Transferred To	Ref
GK	(Malaysia) Haziq Nadzli	(Malaysia) Perak	Undisclosed (Note: Haziq Nadzli's loan to Perak FC is make permanent in Feb 2025.)
FW	(Malaysia) Akhyar Rashid	(Malaysia) Terengganu	Undisclosed (Note: Akhyar Rashid's loan to Terengganu FC terminated in Jan 2025 as the move is make permanent.)
FW	(Gabon) Lévy Madinda	(Indonesia) PS Barito Putera (Liga 1)	Free
FW	(Argentina) Fernando Forestieri		Free

=== Loan Out ===
Preseason

Position	Player	Transferred To	Ref
GK	(Malaysia) Haziq Nadzli	(Malaysia) Perak	Season loan till May 2025 (Note: Haziq Nadzli's loan to Perak FC is make permanent in Feb 2025.)
DF	(Malaysia) Azam Azmi	(Malaysia) Terengganu	Season loan till May 2025
DF	(Malaysia) (England) Daniel Ting	(Malaysia) Sabah	Season loan till May 2025
DF	(Malaysia) (England) Declan Lambert	(Malaysia) Kuala Lumpur City	Season loan till May 2025
MF	(Malaysia) (England) Ryan Lambert	(Malaysia) Kuala Lumpur City	Season loan till May 2025
MF	(Malaysia) Danial Amier Norhisham	(Malaysia) Kuching City	Season loan till May 2025
MF	(Malaysia) Syamer Kutty Abba	(Malaysia) Penang	Season loan till May 2025
FW	(Argentina) Manuel Hidalgo	(Malaysia) Sri Pahang	Season loan till May 2025
FW	(Malaysia) Safawi Rasid	(Malaysia) Terengganu	Season loan till May 2025
FW	(Malaysia) Akhyar Rashid	(Malaysia) Terengganu	Season loan till May 2025 (Note: Akhyar Rashid's loan to Terengganu FC is make permanent in Jan 2025.)
FW	(Malaysia) Syafiq Ahmad	(Malaysia) Kedah Darul Aman	Season loan till May 2025

Mid-season

Position	Player	Transferred To	Ref
MF	(Malaysia) (Scotland) Fergus Tierney	(Thailand) Chonburi (Thai League 2)	Season loan till May 2025 (Note: Fergus Tierney's loan to Chonburi FC terminated in Nov 2024 before he moves to Nakhon Pathom United.)
MF	(Malaysia) (Brazil) Endrick	(Vietnam) Ho Chi Minh City (V.League 1)	Season loan till May 2025
MF	(Syria) (Argentina) Jalil Elías	(Argentina) Vélez Sarsfield (Argentine Primera División)	Season loan till Dec 2024
MF	(Portugal) Francisco Geraldes	(Spain) CD Eldense (Segunda División)	Season loan till 30 June 2025 (Note: Francisco Geraldes's loan to CD Eldense is cut short in Feb 2025)
MF	(Malaysia) Ramadhan Saifullah	(Malaysia) Kuching City	Season loan till May 2025
MF	(Malaysia) (Scotland) Fergus Tierney	(Thailand) Nakhon Pathom United (Thai League 1)	Season loan till May 2025
MF	(Portugal) Francisco Geraldes	(New Zealand) Wellington Phoenix (A-League Men)	Season loan till 30 July 2025
FW	(Italy) (Romania) (Sweden) (Brazil) Nicolao Dumitru	(Indonesia) PSS Sleman (Liga 1)	Season loan till May 2025

== Friendly matches ==
Win Draw Loss

=== Tour of Spain (14-30 April) ===
17 April 2024 1	Johor Darul Ta'zim (Malaysia)	3–0	(Spain) Real Murcia (S3)	Murcia
	Jalil Elías 3'; Arif Aiman Hanapi 13'; Francisco Geraldes 73'			Stadium: Estadio Nueva Condomina

18 April 2024 2	Johor Darul Ta'zim (Malaysia)	3–1	(Spain) La Nucía (S4)	La Nucia
	Óscar Arribas 26', 73'; Nicolao Dumitru 37'		Cristian Martinez 8'	Stadium: Estadi Olímpic Camilo Cano

23 April 2024 3	Johor Darul Ta'zim (Malaysia)	7–0	(Spain) Club Costa City (Amateurs)	La Nucia
	Ramadhan Saifullah 6', 65', 73'; Nazmi Faiz 10'; G.Pavithran 70'; Gabriel Nistelrooy 76', 85'			Stadium: Estadi Olímpic Camilo Cano

24 April 2024 4	Johor Darul Ta'zim (Malaysia)	2–1	(Spain) CD Alcoyano (S3)	Alcoy
	Nazmi Faiz 18'; Ramadhan Saifullah 52'		Dani Selma 76'	Stadium: Estadio El Collao

25 April 2024 5	Johor Darul Ta'zim (Malaysia)	0–2	(Spain) CD Eldense (S2)	Elda
			Joel Jorquera 52'; Marc-Olivier Doué 60'	Stadium: Nuevo Pepico Amat

29 April 2024 6	Johor Darul Ta'zim (Malaysia)	2–1	(Spain) Benidorm (S7)	Alicante
	Endrick 57'; Francisco Geraldes 84'		Blasco de Freitas 83'	Stadium: Estadio Municipal Guillermo Amor

=== Others ===
 JDT-Police Tero Double Header 

14 March 2024 1	Johor Darul Ta'zim (Malaysia)	5–0	(Thailand) Police Tero	Johor
				Stadium: Sultan Ibrahim Stadium

17 March 2024 2	Johor Darul Ta'zim (Malaysia)	2–3	(Thailand) Police Tero	Johor
				Stadium: Sultan Ibrahim Stadium

 JDT-Chonburi Double Header 

20 March 2024 3	Johor Darul Ta'zim II (Malaysia)	1–2	(Thailand) Chonburi	Johor
				Stadium: Pasir Gudang Corporation Stadium

22 March 2024 4	Johor Darul Ta'zim (Malaysia)	4–1	(Thailand) Chonburi	Johor
				Stadium: Sultan Ibrahim Stadium

 LCS-JDT Double Header 

4 April 2024 5	Lion City Sailors (Singapore)	1–2	(Malaysia) Johor Darul Ta'zim	Bishan
	Maxime Lestienne 37'		Nicolao Dumitru 9'; Romel Morales 23'	Stadium: Bishan Stadium; Attendance: 2,477; Referee: Mohd Taqi

8 April 2024 6	Johor Darul Ta'zim (Malaysia)	4–0	(Singapore) Lion City Sailors	Johor
	Fernando Forestieri 41' (pen.); Juan Muniz 45', 67'; Heberty 52'			Stadium: Sultan Ibrahim Stadium

 Mid Season Friendly 

4 September 2024 Friendly	Johor Darul Ta'zim (Malaysia)	3–1	(Thailand) Port	Johor
	Óscar Arribas 14'; Jorge Obregón 57', 90'		Willen Mota 81'	Stadium: Sultan Ibrahim Stadium

7 September 2024 Friendly	Singapore	0–3	(Malaysia) Johor Darul Ta’zim	Kallang
19:30 UTC+8			Nazmi Faiz 31'; Jorge Obregón 58'; Mohamadou Sumareh 90'	Stadium: Kallang Football Hub

8 September 2024 Friendly	Johor Darul Ta'zim II (Malaysia)	5–3	(Singapore) Albirex Niigata (S)	Johor
	Daryl Sham 62', 75'; Danish Zahir 64'; Ramadhan Saifullah 85'; Danish Syamer 87'		Arya Igami 16'; Yohei Otake 32'; Shingo Nakano 51'	Stadium: Pasir Gudang Corporation Stadium

12 October 2024 Friendly	Johor Darul Ta'zim III (Malaysia)	3–3	(Singapore) Geylang International	Johor
				Stadium: Pasir Gudang Corporation Stadium

14 October 2024 Friendly	Johor Darul Ta'zim (Malaysia)	8–0	(Singapore) Balestier Khalsa	Johor
	Bergson Da Silva 4', 18', 63'; Óscar Arribas 10'; Heberty 46', 58'; Gabriel Nistelrooy 81'; Jese 83'			Stadium: Sultan Ibrahim Stadium

16 November 2024 Friendly	Johor Darul Ta'zim (Malaysia)	1–0	(Singapore) Lion City Sailors	Johor
	Shahrul Saad 88'			Stadium: Sultan Ibrahim Stadium

== Competitions (JDT) ==
=== Overview ===
Competition	First match	Last match	Starting round	Final position	Record							
Competition	First match	Last match	Starting round	Final position	Pld	W	D	L	GF	GA	GD	Win %
Malaysia Super League (Note: Includes the Charity Shield.)	10 May 2024	17 April 2025	Matchday 1	Winners	24	23	1	0	90	8	+82	95.83
Malaysia FA Cup	13 June 2024	24 August 2024	Round of 16	Winners	6	6	0	0	28	2	+26	100.00
Malaysia Cup	20 November 2024	26 April 2025	Round of 16	Winners	7	7	0	0	23	3	+20	100.00
AFC Champions League Elite	18 September 2024	11 March 2025	League stage	Round of 16	10	4	3	3	16	10	+6	40.00
Total					47	40	4	3	157	23	+134	85.11

Last updated: 26 April 2025
Source: Competitions

=== Malaysia Super League ===
Win Draw Loss

Update: 9 April 2024

10 May 2024 1	Johor Darul Ta'zim	3–0 (awarded) (Note: Match was deemed as cancelled by FAM after Selangor FC withdrew due to safety concerns following a series of attacks on players. As a result, JDT is awarded a 3-0 win)	Selangor	Johor
21:00 MYT				Stadium: Sultan Ibrahim Stadium

18 May 2024 2	Johor Darul Ta'zim	3–1	Negeri Sembilan	Johor
17:30 MYT	Bergson Da Silva 12', 17'; La'Vere Corbin-Ong (yellow card) 64'; Jordi Amat 71'	Report	Hein Htet Aung 28'; Aroon Kumar (yellow card) 39'; Jacque Faye (yellow card) 48'; Muhammad Aqil Razak (yellow card) 53'; Zainal Abidin Jamil (yellow card) 83'	Stadium: Sultan Ibrahim Stadium; Attendance: 19,988; Referee: Muhammad Usaid Bin Jamal

25 May 2024 3	Kuala Lumpur City	1–5	Johor Darul Ta'zim	Kuala Lumpur
17:30 MYT	Paulo Josué 48' (pen.); Kenny Pallraj (yellow card) 58'; Zhafri Yahya (yellow card) 64'; Giancarlo Gallifuoco (yellow card) 77'	Report	Hong Wan (yellow card) 27'; Francisco Geraldes (yellow card) 29'; Fernando Forestieri 43', 61'; Juan Muñiz 45+5', 71'; Óscar Arribas (yellow card) 45+7'; Natxo Insa (yellow card) 86'; Syahmi Safari 88'	Stadium: Kuala Lumpur Stadium; Attendance: 4,750; Referee: Muhammad Nazmi Bin Nasaruddin

22 June 2024 4	Johor Darul Ta'zim	3–0	Sri Pahang	Johor
17:15 MYT	Heberty Fernandes 5', 67', 87'; Hong Wan (yellow card) 55'; Jordi Amat (yellow card) 71'	Report	Kuvondik Ruziev (yellow card) 24'; Kpah Sherman (yellow card) 28'; Stefano Brundo (yellow card) 30'; Zarif Irfan Hashimuddin (yellow card) 61'	Stadium: Sultan Ibrahim Stadium; Attendance: 17,157; Referee: Suhaizi Shukri

13 July 2024 5	Sabah	1–3	Johor Darul Ta'zim	Kota Kinabalu
21:00 MYT	Gabriel Peres 52' (pen.); Rawilson Batuil (yellow card) 90+5'	Report	Morales 21', 44'; Bergson Da Silva 90+8' (pen.) (yellow card) 77'; Matthew Davies (yellow card) 47'	Stadium: Likas Stadium; Attendance: 11,569; Referee: Razlan Joffri Ali

26 July 2024 6	Johor Darul Ta'zim	4–0	Terengganu	Johor
21:00 MYT	Heberty Fernandes 5'; Bergson Da Silva 32' (pen.), 64', 90+2'; Matthew Davies (yellow card) 36'; Romel Morales (yellow card) 51'; Jordi Amat (yellow card) 52'; Heberty (yellow card) 54'	Report	Matthew Steenvoorden (yellow card) 54'; Marin Pilj (yellow card) 67'	Stadium: Sultan Ibrahim Stadium; Attendance: 21,365; Referee: Fitri Maskon

31 July 2024 7	PDRM	1–1	Johor Darul Ta'zim	Petaling Jaya
21:00 MYT	Shahrel Fikri 22' (yellow card) 54'; Nor Hakeem (yellow card) 33'	Report	Óscar Arribas 32' (yellow card) 80'	Stadium: Petaling Jaya Stadium; Attendance: 5,500; Referee: Shukor Zulkiflee

9 August 2024 8	Johor Darul Ta'zim	6–0	Kedah Darul Aman	Johor
21:00 MYT	Bergson Da Silva 8', 35', 64'; Feroz Baharudin 74'; Murilo 75'; Afiq Fazail 79'	Report	Habib Haroon (yellow card) 24'; Amirul Hisyam (yellow card) 67'	Stadium: Sultan Ibrahim Stadium; Attendance: 15,216; Referee: S. Logeswaran

10 November 2024 9 (Rescheduled)	Perak	0–5	Johor Darul Ta'zim	Johor
21:00 MYT	Fadhil Idris (yellow card) 9'; Jesper Nyholm (yellow card) 45+2'; Adilet Kanybekov (yellow card) 86'; Tommy Mawat (yellow card) 86'	Report	Morales 21', 35'; Bergson Da Silva 23', 45+3' (pen.), 90'; Feroz Baharudin (yellow card) 49'; Juan Muñiz (yellow card) 50'; Arif Aiman (yellow card) 86'	Stadium: Sultan Ibrahim Stadium (Note: Location changed due to Sultan Ibrahim Stadium following FAM decision to classify the match to be of a safety risk for a high-profile match. However, Perak FC will still be the designated "Home Team" for this match.); Attendance: 11,923; Referee: Razlan Joffri Ali

12 September 2024 10 (Rescheduled)	Johor Darul Ta'zim	5–0	Penang	Johor
21:00 MYT	Óscar Arribas 3'; Jorge Obregón 41', 49'; Bergson 66' (pen.); Arif Aiman 90+4' (pen.)	Report	Rafael Vitor (yellow card) 45'; Dylan Christopher (yellow card) 85'	Stadium: Sultan Ibrahim Stadium; Attendance: 13,975; Referee: Razlan Joffri Ali

22 September 2024 11	Kelantan Darul Naim	1–6	Johor Darul Ta'zim	Johor
21:00 MYT	Layth Kharoub 65'; Fazrul Amir (yellow card) 63'	Report	Bergson Da Silva 42', 44', 71'; Arif Aiman 55', 58'; Umeir Aznan 55' (o.g.)	Stadium: Sultan Ibrahim Stadium (Note: Location changed due to Sultan Muhammad IV Stadium undergoing renovation. However, Kelantan Darul Naim FC will still be the designated "Home Team" for this match.); Attendance: 12,570; Referee: Kamil Zakaria Ismail

27 September 2024 12	Johor Darul Ta'zim	2–1	Kuching City	Johor
21:00 MYT	Bergson Da Silva 48'; Juan Muñiz 81'; Nazmi Faiz (yellow card) 84'	Report	Nando Welter 84'; Arif Fadzilah (yellow card) 62'; Nur Shamie (yellow card) 62'; Diego Baggio Anak Test (yellow card) 79'	Stadium: Sultan Ibrahim Stadium; Attendance: 14,388; Referee: Fusser Sallih

27 October 2024 13	Selangor	0–3	Johor Darul Ta'zim	Petaling Jaya
21:00 MYT	Nooa Laine (yellow card) 79'	Report	Morales 19'; Bergson Da Silva 42', 54' (pen.) (yellow card) 77'; Iker Undabarrena (yellow card) 26'; Juan Muñiz (yellow card) 50'; Park Jun-heong (yellow card) 53'	Stadium: Petaling Jaya Stadium; Attendance: 10,215; Referee: Nazmi Nasaruddin

1 November 2024 14	Negeri Sembilan	0–4	Johor Darul Ta'zim	Paroi
21:00 MYT	Harith Samsuri (red card) 90+3'	Report	Heberty Fernandes 15', 21' (yellow card) 37'; Arif Aiman 51'; Jorge Obregón 90+5' (pen.); Eddy Pascual (yellow card) 58'; Shahrul Saad (yellow card) 83'	Stadium: Tuanku Abdul Rahman Stadium; Attendance: 4,717; Referee: Firdaus Dahlan

8 December 2024 15	Johor Darul Ta'zim	3–0	Kuala Lumpur City	Johor
	Arif Aiman 12', 36', 42' (pen.)	Report	Declan Lambert (yellow card) 26'; Adrijan Rudović (yellow card) 43'	Stadium: Sultan Ibrahim Stadium; Attendance: 9,808; Referee: Fitri Maskon

17 December 2024 16	Sri Pahang	1–3	Johor Darul Ta'zim	Kuantan
	David Rowley 53'; Aleksandar Cvetković (yellow card) 56'; Baqiuddin Shamsudin (yellow card) 60'	Report	Adam Nor Azli 48' (o.g.); Bergson Da Silva 52', 90+7' (pen.)	Stadium: Darul Makmur Stadium; Attendance: 5,674; Referee: Ahmad Zuhadi Dzulkifli

11 January 2025 17	Johor Darul Ta'zim	4–0	Sabah	Johor
	Juan Muñiz 51', 69'; Bergson Da Silva 79' (pen.), 83'; Afiq Fazail (yellow card) 53'	Report	Gary Steven Robbat (yellow card) 33'; Dominic Tan (yellow card) 39'; João Pedro (yellow card) 58'	Stadium: Sultan Ibrahim Stadium; Attendance: 11,363; Referee: Hasrol Amir

26 January 2025 18	Terengganu	0–1	Johor Darul Ta'zim	Terengganu
		Report	Juan Muñiz 13'; Matthew Davies (yellow card) 18'	Stadium: Sultan Mizan Zainal Abidin Stadium; Attendance: 2,046; Referee: Ahmad Zuhadi Dzulkifli

5 February 2025 19	Johor Darul Ta'zim	4–0	PDRM	Johor
	Jorge Obregón 14'; La'Vere Corbin-Ong 39'; Jese 55'; Romel Morales 81'; Herberty (yellow card) 28'	Report	Imran Samso (yellow card) 23'	Stadium: Sultan Ibrahim Stadium; Attendance: 12,600; Referee: Fusser Sallih

24 February 2025 21 (Rescheduled)	Johor Darul Ta'zim	2–0	Perak	Johor
	Jese 45'; Jorge Obregón 64' (pen.); Nazim Manzor (yellow card) 66'; Shahrul Saad (yellow card) 71'	Report	Wan Zack Haikal (yellow card) 61'	Stadium: Sultan Ibrahim Stadium; Attendance: 12,517; Referee: Ahmad Zuhadi Dzulkifli

29 March 2025 21 (Rescheduled)	Kedah Darul Aman	1–6	Johor Darul Ta'zim	Alor Setar
	Afiq Iqmal 33'		Bergson Da Silva 17', 24' (pen.), 90+4'; Romel Morales 19'; Jordi Amat 61' (yellow card) 53'; Naim Faiz 82'; Matthew Davies (yellow card) 3'; Óscar Arribas (yellow card) 47'; Park Jun-heong (yellow card) 55'	Stadium: Darul Aman Stadium

16 March 2025 22	Penang	0–3	Johor Darul Ta'zim	George Town
	Richmond Tetteh Ankrah (yellow card) 67'		Eddy Israfilov 20', 27'; Herberty 54'; Bergson (penalty missed) 36; Nazim Manzor (yellow card) 66'; Matt Davies (yellow card) 76'; Shahrul Saad (yellow card) 78'; Juan Muniz (yellow card) 81'	Stadium: City Stadium

10 April 2025 23 (Rescheduled)	Johor Darul Ta'zim	9–0	Kelantan Darul Naim	Johor
	Bergson Da Silva 8', 20', 24', 26', 36'; Romel Morales 56', 58'; Shahrul Saad 63'; Safiq Rahim 84'			Stadium: Sultan Ibrahim Stadium

17 April 2025 24	Kuching City	0–2	Johor Darul Ta'zim	Kuching
			Bergson Da Silva 5'; Romel Morales 26'; Arif Aiman (yellow card) 58'	Stadium: Sarawak Stadium

==== Table ====
Pos	Team	Pld	W	D	L	GF	GA	GD	Pts	Qualification or relegation
1	Johor Darul Ta'zim (C)	24	23	1	0	90	8	+82	70	Qualification for the AFC Champions League Elite league stage & ASEAN Club Championship
2	Selangor	24	16	4	4	44	16	+28	52	Qualification for the AFC Champions League Two group stage & ASEAN Club Championship (Note: Since the winners of the 2024 Malaysia FA Cup (Johor Darul Ta'zim) qualified for AFC competition based on their league positions, the berth is awarded to the 2nd-placed team in the league.)
3	Sabah	24	11	7	6	41	33	+8	40	
4	Kuching City	24	10	9	5	38	28	+10	39	
5	Terengganu	24	9	8	7	35	26	+9	35	

Source: MFL
Rules for classification: 1) Points; 2) Goal difference; 3) Goals scored;
(C) Champions

=== Malaysia FA Cup ===
13 June 2024 Round of 16	Johor Darul Ta'zim	4–0	Kelantan Darul Naim	Iskandar Puteri
21:00 UTC+8	Forestieri 44'; Morales 61'; Geraldes 82'; Arif Aiman 90+4' (pen.); Hong Wan (yellow card) 12'	Report	Muhaimin Mohamad (yellow card) 14'	Stadium: Sultan Ibrahim Stadium; Attendance: 11,444; Referee: Kamil Zakaria

==== Quarter Final ====
29 June 2024 QF 1st leg	Malaysian University	0–5	Johor Darul Ta'zim	Johor
21:00 MYT	Tuan Muqris Tuan Marzuki (yellow card) 63'	Report	Corbin-Ong 2'; Geraldes 48', 61'; Shahrul 71'; Morales 80'	Stadium: Sultan Ibrahim Stadium (Note: Malaysian University applied to change the venue due to the unsuitability of their stadium, UKM Bangi Stadium, Bangi, to host the match. Their application to play at Sultan Ibrahim Stadium on the first leg, was approved by Johor Darul Ta'zim.); Attendance: 6,490; Referee: Khairulsyahmi Ahmad Khalidi

5 July 2024 QF 2nd leg	Johor Darul Ta'zim	8–0 (13–0 agg.)	Malaysian University	Johor
21:00 MYT	Muñiz 20'; Heberty 27' (pen.), 30'; Feroz 35'; Geraldes 61'; Morales 73', 90+1'; Bérgson 78'; Shahrul Saad (yellow card) 70'	Report	Irfan Syafiq (yellow card) 51'; Saiful Iskandar (yellow card) 73'	Stadium: Sultan Ibrahim Stadium; Attendance: 6,583; Referee: Faizudin Ismail

Johor Darul Ta'zim won 13–0 on aggregate.

==== Semi Final ====
20July 2024 SF 1st leg	Kedah Darul Aman	1–2	Johor Darul Ta'zim	Alor Setar
21:00 MYT	Habib 87'	Report	Arribas 24'; Morales 90+9'; Herberty (yellow card) 28'; Syihan Hazmi (yellow card) 82'; Feroz Baharudin (yellow card) 88'	Stadium: Darul Aman Stadium; Attendance: 18,317; Referee: Nazmi Nasaruddin

3 August 2024 SF 2nd leg	Johor Darul Ta'zim	3–0 (5–1 agg.)	Kedah Darul Aman	Johor
21:00 MYT	Feroz 50'; Bérgson 76'; Nazmi Faiz (yellow card) 90'; Muñiz 83'; Sonny Norde (yellow card) 25' (yellow-red card) 86'	Report		Stadium: Sultan Ibrahim Stadium; Attendance: 25,112; Referee: Ahmad Zuhadi Dzulkifli

Johor Darul Ta'zim won 5–1 on aggregate.

==== Final ====
24 August 2024 Final	Johor Darul Ta'zim	6–1	Selangor	Kuala Lumpur
21:00 MYT	Muñiz 26', 67', 90'; Arif Aiman 42'; Bérgson 62'; Heberty 76' (yellow card) 29'; Shane Lowry (yellow card) 40'	Report	Fortes 59'; Fazly Mazlan (yellow card) 5'; Noor Al-Rawabdeh (yellow card) 40'; Ronnie Fernández (yellow card) 66'; Safuwan Baharudin (yellow card) 88'	Stadium: Bukit Jalil National Stadium; Referee: Nazmi Nasaruddin

=== Malaysia Cup ===
==== Round of 16 ====
20 November 2024 R16 1st leg	Kuala Lumpur Rovers	0–3	Johor Darul Ta'zim	Johor
21:00 MYT		Report	Herberty 26', 30', 71'; Ahmad Aysar (yellow card) 57'	Stadium: Sultan Ibrahim Stadium (Note: Location changed due to Sultan Ibrahim Stadium but Kuala Lumpur Rovers will still be the designated "Home Team" for this match.); Attendance: 2,005; Referee: Fusser Mad Sallih

29 November 2024 R16 2nd leg	Johor Darul Ta'zim	6–0 (9–0 agg.)	Kuala Lumpur Rovers	Johor
21:00 MYT	Raffi 13' (o.g.); Corbin-Ong 33'; Jesé 45+3'; Bérgson 75', 82'; Sumareh 88'	Report		Stadium: Sultan Ibrahim Stadium; Attendance: 7,127; Referee: Firdaus Dahlan

==== Quarter Final ====
13 December 2024 QF 1st leg	Kuala Lumpur City	1–2	Johor Darul Ta'zim	Cheras
--:-- MYT	Brendan 89'; Jovan Motika (yellow card) 37'	Report	Bérgson 33'; Heberty 79'; Jordi Amat (yellow card) 67'	Stadium: Kuala Lumpur Stadium; Attendance: 3,204; Referee: Suhaizi Shukri

21 December 2024 QF 2nd leg	Johor Darul Ta'zim	4–0 (6–1 agg.)	Kuala Lumpur City	Johor
--:-- MYT	Arif Aiman 36' (pen.); Bérgson 45+2', 56' (pen.); Muñiz 62'; Feroz Baharudin (yellow card) 78'	Report	Zhafri Yayah (yellow card) 13'; Hadi Mizei @ Termizi (yellow card) 45'; Suhaimi Abu (yellow card) 73'	Stadium: Sultan Ibrahim Stadium; Attendance: 14,894; Referee: S. Logeswaran

==== Semi Final ====
17 January 2025 SF 1st leg	Terengganu	0–4	Johor Darul Ta'zim	Terengganu
21:00 UTC+8	Shahrul Nizam (yellow card) 41'; Nelson Bonilla (yellow card) 75'	Report	Romel Morales 17'; Arif Aiman Hanapi 79', 85' (yellow card) 48'; Bergson 90+2'; Park Jun-heong (yellow card) 72'	Stadium: Sultan Mizan Zainal Abidin Stadium; Attendance: 8,000; Referee: Fitri Maskon

1 February 2025 SF 2nd leg	Johor Darul Ta'zim	2–1 (6–1 agg.)	Terengganu	Johor
21:00 UTC+8	Heberty 32', 90+1'; Eddy Pascual (yellow card) 37'	Report	Ismahil Akinade 59'; Ubaidullah Shamsul (yellow card) 43'	Stadium: Sultan Ibrahim Stadium; Attendance: 23,081; Referee: S. Logeswaran

==== Final ====
26 April 2025 Final	Johor Darul Ta'zim	2–1	Sri Pahang	Kuala Lumpur
21:00 UTC+8	Bergson da Silva 54' (pen.) (yellow card) 35'; Arif Aiman 74'; Heberty (yellow card) 35'; Park Jun-Heong (yellow card) 45+6' (yellow-red card) 57'		T. Saravanan 14'; Baqiuddin Shamsudin (yellow card) 9'; Sergio Aguero (yellow card) 32' (yellow-red card) 34'; Mykola Ahapov (yellow card) 80'; Ibrahim Manusi (yellow card) 85'; Azrif Nasrulhaq (yellow card) 90+6'	Stadium: Bukit Jalil National Stadium

=== AFC Champions League Elite ===
Pos	Team	Pld	W	D	L	GF	GA	GD	Pts	Qualification
1	(Japan) Yokohama F. Marinos	7	6	0	1	21	7	+14	18	Advance to round of 16
2	(Japan) Kawasaki Frontale	7	5	0	2	13	4	+9	15	Advance to round of 16
3	(Malaysia) Johor Darul Ta'zim	7	4	2	1	16	8	+8	14	Advance to round of 16
4	(South Korea) Gwangju	7	4	2	1	15	9	+6	14	Advance to round of 16
5	(Japan) Vissel Kobe	7	4	1	2	14	9	+5	13	Advance to round of 16

Source: Asian Football Confederation
Rules for classification: 1) points; 2) goal difference; 3) number of goals scored; 4) number of matches won; 5) penalty shoot-out if only two teams remain tied and played each other on the final matchday 6) fair play ranking; 7) drawing of lots

Win Draw Loss -->

==== Group stage ====
18 September 2024 1	Shanghai Port (China)	2–2	(Malaysia) Johor Darul Ta'zim	Shanghai, China
	Gustavo 49'; Willian Popp 73'; Wei Zhen (yellow card) 24'; Matheus Jussa (yellow card) 68'	Report	Arif Aiman 45', 57'; Murilo (yellow card) 13'	Stadium: Pudong Football Stadium; Attendance: 12,533; Referee: Ahmed Al-Kaf (Oman)

1 October 2024 2	Johor Darul Ta'zim (Malaysia)	3–0	(China) Shanghai Shenhua	Johor, Malaysia
	Arif Aiman 11'; Jorge Obregón 26'; Juan Muñiz 80'; Óscar Arribas (yellow card) 36'; Murilo (yellow card) 13'	Report	Fernandinho (yellow card) 6'; Cephas Malele (yellow card) 69'; Jin Shunkai (yellow card) 79'	Stadium: Sultan Ibrahim Stadium; Attendance: 31,386; Referee: Adel Al-Naqbi (United Arab Emirates)

22 October 2024 3	Gwangju FC (South Korea)	3–1	(Malaysia) Johor Darul Ta'zim	Yongin, South Korea
	Jasir Asani 3', 6'; Park Jun-heong 88' (o.g.); Lee Hui-Gyun (yellow card) 60'	Report	Feroz Baharudin 28'; Andoni Zubiaurre (yellow card) 54'; Juan Muñiz (yellow card) 60'; Arif Aiman (yellow card) 72'	Stadium: Gwangju Football Stadium (Note: Match to be played at Yongin Mireu Stadium, Yongin, instead of their regular home stadium, Gwangju Football Stadium due to severe pitch issues.); Attendance: 2,101; Referee: Salman Ahmad Falahi (Qatar)

5 November 2024 4	Johor Darul Ta'zim (Malaysia)	3–0	(South Korea) Ulsan HD	Johor, Malaysia
	Arif Aiman 9'; Óscar Arribas 68'; Bergson 88'	Report	Hwang Seok-ho (yellow card) 55'; Lim Jong-eun (yellow card) 82'	Stadium: Sultan Ibrahim Stadium; Attendance: 34,236; Referee: Adham Makhadmeh (Jordan)

26 November 2024 5	Shandong Taishan (China)	Voided (1–0)	(Malaysia) Johor Darul Ta'zim	Jinan, China
	Zeca 68' (yellow card) 87'; Zhang Chi (yellow card) 32'; Li Yuanyi (yellow card) 50'; Cryzan (yellow card) 87'; Wu Xinghan (yellow card) 90'; Liu Binbin (yellow card) 90+10'	Report	Iker Undabarrena (yellow card) 22'; Juan Muñiz (yellow card) 24'; Natxo Insa (yellow card) 45+1'; La'Vere Corbin-Ong (yellow card) 45+7'; Eddy Pascual (yellow card) 90+10'	Stadium: Jinan Olympic Sports Center Stadium; Attendance: 9,763; Referee: Alireza Faghani (Iran)

3 December 2024 6	Johor Darul Ta'zim (Malaysia)	0–0	(Thailand) Buriram United	Johor, Malaysia
	Juan Muñiz (yellow card) 4'; Murilo (red card) 13'; Park Jun-heong (red card) 90+4'	Report	Supachai Chaided (yellow card) 18'; Phitiwat Sukjitthammakul (yellow card) 27'; Theerathon Bunmathan (yellow card) 42' (red card) 45'; Neil Etheridge (yellow card) 54'	Stadium: Sultan Ibrahim Stadium; Attendance: 31,687; Referee: Khalid Saleh Al-Turais (Saudi Arabia)

11 February 2025 7	Central Coast Mariners (Australia)	1–2	(Malaysia) Johor Darul Ta'zim	Gosford, Australia
	Alou Kuol 70'; Brian Kaltak (yellow card) 34'; Dylan Peraić-Cullen (red card) 45+1'; Sasha Kuzevski (yellow card) 90+1'; Diesel Herrington (yellow card) 90+2'	Report	Álvaro González 65', 79' (yellow card) 69'; Jordi Amat (yellow card) 82'; Andoni Zubiaurre (yellow card) 90+1'; Eddy Pascual (yellow card) 90+6'	Stadium: Central Coast Stadium; Attendance: 1,610; Referee: Ko Hyung-jin (South Korea)

18 February 2025 8	Johor Darul Ta'zim (Malaysia)	5–2	(South Korea) Pohang Steelers	Johor, Malaysia
	Óscar Arribas 37'; Bergson 52' (yellow card) 59'; Arif Aiman 56'; Jesé 90+7'; Jorge Obregón 90+13' (pen.); Afiq Fazail (yellow card) 76'	Report	Lee Ho-jae 27'; Kang Hyeon-Je 80' (yellow card) 90+8'	Stadium: Sultan Ibrahim Stadium; Attendance: 34,590; Referee: Adham Makhadmeh (Jordan)

==== Knockout stage ====
4 March 2025 R16 Leg 1	Buriram United (Thailand)	0–0	(Malaysia) Johor Darul Ta'zim	Buriram, Thailand
	Martin Boakye (yellow card) 48'	Report	Natxo Insa (yellow card) 27'; Óscar Arribas (yellow card) 52'; Eddy Israfilov (yellow card) 54'; Álvaro González (yellow card) 90+1'	Stadium: Buriram Stadium; Attendance: 22,207; Referee: Khalaf Al Shammari (Saudi Arabia)

11 March 2025 R16 Leg 2	Johor Darul Ta'zim (Malaysia)	0–1 (0–1 agg.)	(Thailand) Buriram United	Johor, Malaysia
	Arif Aiman (yellow card) 51'; Samu Castillejo (yellow card) 90+3'; Natxo Insa (yellow card) 90+6'; Jorge Obregón (yellow card) 90+8'	Report	Suphanat Mueanta 58'; Peter Žulj (yellow card) 25'; Martin Boakye (yellow card) 48'; Curtis Good (yellow card) 56'	Stadium: Sultan Ibrahim Stadium; Referee: Ahmad Al-Ali (Kuwait)

== Club statistics ==
Correct as of match played @ 26 Apr 2025

No.	Pos.	Player	Malaysia Super League		FA Cup		Malaysia Cup		ACL / AFC Cup		Charity Shield		Total	
No.	Pos.	Player	Apps.	Goals	Apps.	Goals	Apps.	Goals	Apps.	Goals	Apps.	Goals	Apps.	Goals
1	GK	(Malaysia) Farizal Marlias	0	0	0	0	0	0	0	0	0	0	0	0
2	DF	(Malaysia) (Australia) Matthew Davies	16+2	0	4+1	1	2	0	0+2	0	0	0	27	1
3	DF	(Malaysia) Shahrul Saad	6+6	1	3+3	1	2+2	0	0	0	0	0	22	2
4	MF	(Malaysia) Afiq Fazail	9+6	1	2+2	0	4+2	0	1+6	0	0	0	32	1
5	DF	(Indonesia) (Spain) Jordi Amat	14+1	2	2+1	0	2	0	2+2	0	0	0	24	2
6	MF	(Malaysia) (England) Hong Wan	5+2	0	3+2	0	0	0	0+1	0	0	0	13	0
7	MF	(France) Enzo Lombardo	3	0	0	0	0	0	0	0	0	0	3	0
8	MF	(Malaysia) Safiq Rahim	0+7	1	1	0	1	0	0	0	0	0	9	1
9	FW	(Brazil) Bergson	19+3	32	4+1	3	4+1	5	5+5	2	0	0	42	42
10	MF	(Spain) Jonathan Viera	0	0	0	0	0	0	4	0	0	0	4	0
11	MF	(Brazil) Murilo	2+2	1	1+3	0	0	0	8	0	0	0	16	1
12	GK	(Malaysia) (Spain) Christian Abad Amat	2	0	0	0	2	0	0	0	0	0	4	0
13	DF	(South Korea) Park Jun-heong	9+1	0	0	0	4	0	7	0	0	0	21	0
14	DF	(Australia) (Republic of Ireland) Shane Lowry	1	0	2	0	0	0	6	0	0	0	9	0
15	DF	(Malaysia) Feroz Baharudin	13+1	1	4+1	2	2	0	1+1	1	0	0	23	4
16	GK	(Malaysia) Syihan Hazmi	21	0	5	0	4	0	0	0	0	0	30	0
17	MF	(Spain) Roque Mesa	0	0	0	0	0	0	1	0	0	0	1	0
18	MF	(Spain) Iker Undabarrena	9+1	0	0	0	1+1	0	6	0	0	0	18	0
19	FW	(Malaysia) (Colombia) Romel Morales	13+6	10	2+4	5	2+1	1	0	0	0	0	28	16
20	FW	(Spain) Juan Muñiz	16+3	6	5	6	3+1	1	7+1	1	0	0	36	14
21	MF	(Malaysia) Nazmi Faiz	10+8	1	1+3	0	3+3	0	0	0	0	0	28	1
22	DF	(Malaysia) (Canada) Corbin-Ong	7+9	1	1	0	2+4	0	0	0	0	0	23	1
23	MF	(Azerbaijan) (Spain) Eddy Israfilov	10	2	0	0	3	0	10	0	0	0	22	2
24	MF	(Philippines) (Spain) Óscar Arribas	15+3	1	4	0	2	0	10	2	0	0	34	3
25	MF	(Malaysia) (England) Junior Eldstål	0	0	1	0	1	0	0	0	0	0	2	0
26	MF	(Malaysia) (The Gambia) Mohamadou Sumareh	0+9	0	1	0	0+3	0	0	0	0	0	13	0
27	DF	(Spain) Álvaro González	0	0	0	0	0	0	4	2	0	0	4	2
29	GK	(Malaysia) Izham Tarmizi	0	0	1	0	0	0	0	0	0	0	1	0
30	MF	(Malaysia) (Spain) Natxo Insa	6+7	0	2+1	0	1+1	0	10	0	0	0	28	0
33	FW	(Spain) Jesé	3+4	2	0	0	1+1	0	0+3	1	0	0	12	3
37	FW	(Brazil) Heberty Fernandes	12+8	7	4+1	3	5+1	4	1+8	0	0	0	40	14
39	FW	(Malaysia) Gabriel Nisterroy	0	0	0	0	0+1	0	0	0	0	0	1	0
41	MF	(Malaysia) Ahmad Aysar Hadi	0	0	0	0	1	0	0	0	0	0	1	0
42	FW	(Malaysia) Arif Aiman	20	7	5+1	2	4	4	10	5	0	0	40	18
58	GK	(Spain) Andoni Zubiaurre	0	0	0	0	0	0	10	0	0	0	10	0
71	MF	(Malaysia) Alif Mutalib	0	0	0	0	2	0	0	0	0	0	2	0
77	FW	(Spain) Samu Castillejo	0	0	0	0	0	0	1+1	0	0	0	2	0
80	MF	(Malaysia) Danish Hakimi	0	0	0	0	1	0	0	0	0	0	1	0
81	MF	(Malaysia) (Philippines) Daryl Sham	0	0	0+1	0	1+1	0	0	0	0	0	3	0
82	MF	(Malaysia) Fakrul Haikal	0	0	0	0	1	0	0	0	0	0	1	0
87	MF	(Brazil) Anselmo Moraes	0	0	0	0	0	0	1+1	0	0	0	2	0
91	DF	(Malaysia) Syahmi Safari	0+3	1	1	0	0	0	0	0	0	0	4	1
99	FW	(Colombia) Jorge Obregón	4+4	5	0	0	1+2	0	5+5	1	0	0	21	6
Players who have contracts but have left on loan to other clubs
7	MF	(Syria) (Argentina) Jalil Elías	1	0	0	0	0	0	0	0	0	0	1	0
10	MF	(Portugal) Francisco Geraldes	5+1	0	1+3	3	0	0	0	0	0	0	10	3
16	MF	(Malaysia) Danial Amier Norhisham	0	0	0	0	0	0	0	0	0	0	0	0
17	FW	(Malaysia) Ramadhan Saifullah	0+2	0	1	0	0	0	0	0	0	0	3	0
23	MF	(Malaysia) (Brazil) Endrick	0+2	0	1+1	0	0	0	0	0	0	0	4	0
45	FW	(Argentina) (Italy) Fernando Forestieri	1+1	2	1	1	0	0	0	0	0	0	3	3
77	MF	(Malaysia) Syamer Kutty Abba	0	0	0	0	0	0	0	0	0	0	0	0
??	DF	(Malaysia) Azam Azmi	0	0	0	0	0	0	0	0	0	0	0	0
??	DF	(Malaysia) (England) Daniel Ting	0	0	0	0	0	0	0	0	0	0	0	0
??	DF	(Malaysia) (England) Declan Lambert	0	0	0	0	0	0	0	0	0	0	0	0
??	MF	(Malaysia) (England) Ryan Lambert	0	0	0	0	0	0	0	0	0	0	0	0
??	FW	(Argentina) Manuel Hidalgo	0	0	0	0	0	0	0	0	0	0	0	0
Players who have played this season but had left the club
27	FW	(Italy) (Romania) (Sweden) (Brazil) Nicolao Dumitru	0	0	0	0	0	0	0	0	0	0	0	0
92	FW	(Gabon) Lévy Madinda	0	0	0	0	0	0	0	0	0	0	0	0

== Records and statistics ==
As of 22 April 2024 before the start of the 2024–25 season.

=== All-time current appearances ===
Rank	Player	Years	Club appearances	Total goals	Total assists
1	(Malaysia) (Canada) Corbin-Ong	2018–present	176	6	21
2	(Malaysia) Safiq Rahim	2013–2018 2021–present	175	58	68
3	(Malaysia) Afiq Fazail	2017–present	153	5	30
4	(Malaysia) (Spain) Natxo Insa	2017–present	123	9	10
5	(Malaysia) (Australia) Matthew Davies	2020–present	104	2	12
5	(Malaysia) Arif Aiman	2020–present	104	36	40
7	(Brazil) Bergson	2021–present	100	114	18
8	(Malaysia) Nazmi Faiz	2017–present	74	14	18
9	(Argentina) (Italy) Fernando Forestieri	2022–present	59	47	21
