= Mohamadou Sumareh =

Malaysian footballer

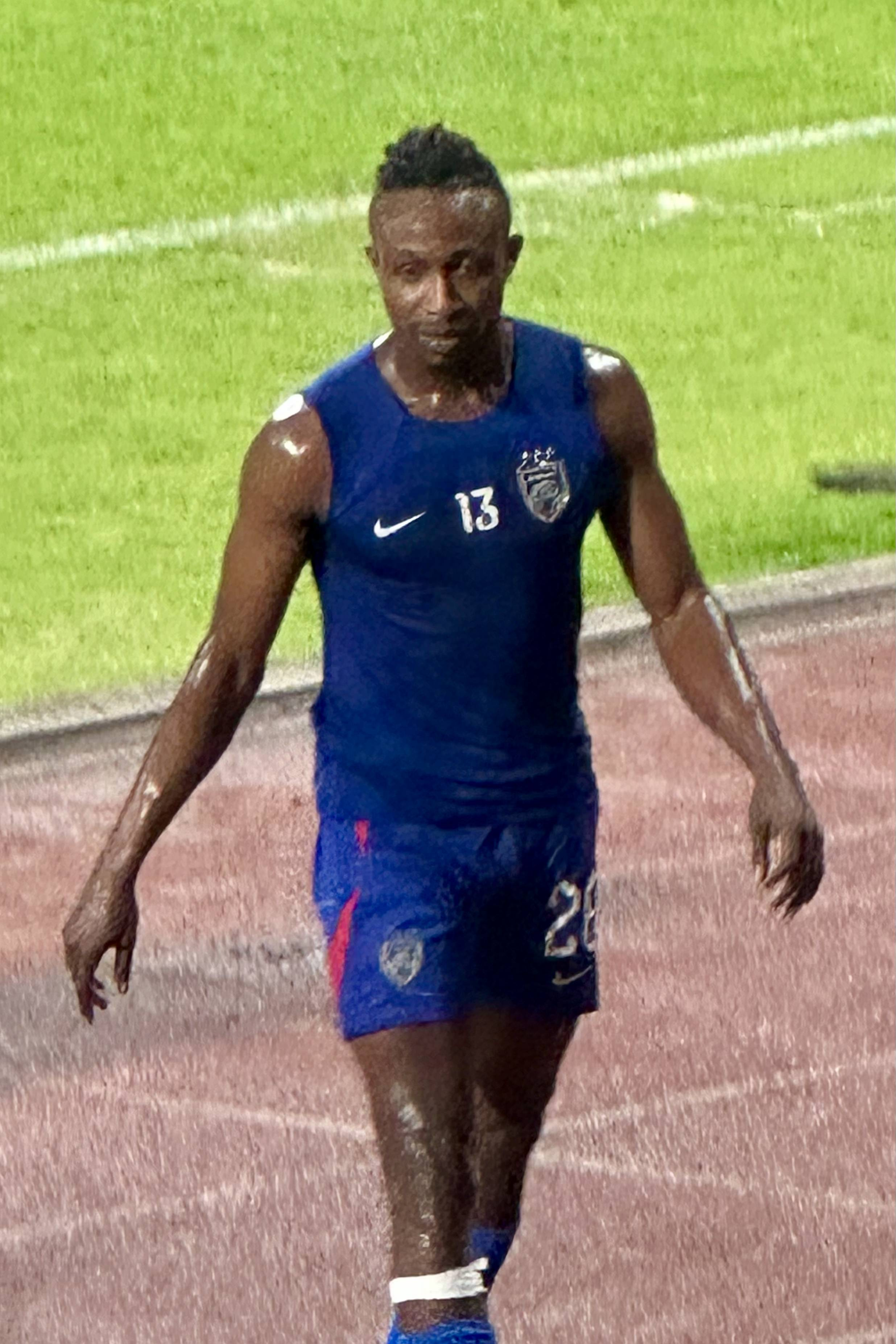
- Sumareh with Johor Darul Ta'zim in 2024

Personal information
- Full name: Mohamadou Sumareh
- Date of birth: 20 September 1994 (age 32)
- Place of birth: Fajara, The Gambia
- Height: 1.79 m (5 ft 10 in)
- Position: Winger

Team information
- Current team: The Cong–Viettel

Youth career
- 2010: Steve Biko

Senior career*
Years	Team	Apps	(Gls)
2012	Terengganu	0	(0)
2012–2015	PDRM	40	(6)
2016	Perlis	22	(5)
2017–2020	Sri Pahang	62	(12)
2020	Police Tero	4	(0)
2021–2026	Johor Darul Ta'zim	29	(4)
2026–	The Cong–Viettel	0	(0)

International career^{‡}
2018–	Malaysia	35	(7)
Medal record
Men's football
Representing Malaysia
AFF Championship
Runner-up	2018
King's Cup
Runner-up	2022
- * Club domestic league appearances and goals as of 20 December 2025 ‡ National team caps and goals as of 20 January 2024

Mohamadou Sumareh (born 20 September 1994) is a professional footballer who plays as a winger for V.League 1 club The Cong–Viettel and the Malaysia national team.

Sumareh began his professional career with Terengganu in January 2012 before moving to PDRM F.C. in December 2012. In December 2015, he joined Perlis, where he made 19 league appearances and scored five goals. Following a brief tenure at Perlis, he signed with Pahang in December 2016, where he made 98 league appearances and scored 17 goals over five years. In February 2021, Sumareh joined Johor Darul Ta'zim. He has been recognized once as the Malaysian Midfielder of the Year.

Born in The Gambia, Sumareh became a Malaysian citizen through naturalization in 2018 and has represented the Malaysia national team since. During his time at Pahang, he was nicknamed "Keliboy" by fans.

In the 2019 season, his performances earned him the Malaysia Football League 'Best Midfielder Award'.

== Early years ==
Sumareh was born in Fajara, The Gambia. Shortly after his birth, his family relocated to the capital, Banjul.

In 2006, Sumareh moved to Malaysia at the age of 12, following his father, who worked as a businessman. He began living in Malaysia permanently three years later. During this time, he developed an appreciation for the local culture and furthered his interest in football. As a teenager, he trained at the Kuala Lumpur Youth Soccer (KLYS) academy.

== Club career ==
=== Steve Biko ===
In late 2010, Sumareh was offered the opportunity to join the Steve Biko academy in Gambia but was not offered a professional contract.

=== Terengganu ===
In late 2011, Sumareh attended a trial with Terengganu. Although he was initially registered for the 2012 Malaysian Super League season, the management later decided to withdraw his registration.

=== PDRM ===
In July 2012, Sumareh signed for Malaysia Premier League club PDRM on a two-year contract. He made his first-team debut and his only season appearances on 7 January 2013 against Betaria in a 5–0 win at the Hang Jebat Stadium where he also scored on his debut match but it cut short with an injury that ruled him out for the rest of the season.

He returned from injury and played a vital part of PDRM 2014 season. He succeeded in helping PDRM to become the 2014 Malaysia Premier League champions, thus promoted to the 2015 Malaysia Super League.

=== Perlis ===
Sumareh signed for Perlis on a one-year contract after the end of his contract with PDRM. He made his Perlis debut on 26 February 2016 against Sime Darby in the Malaysia Premier League, with a 1–1 away draw.

=== Sri Pahang ===
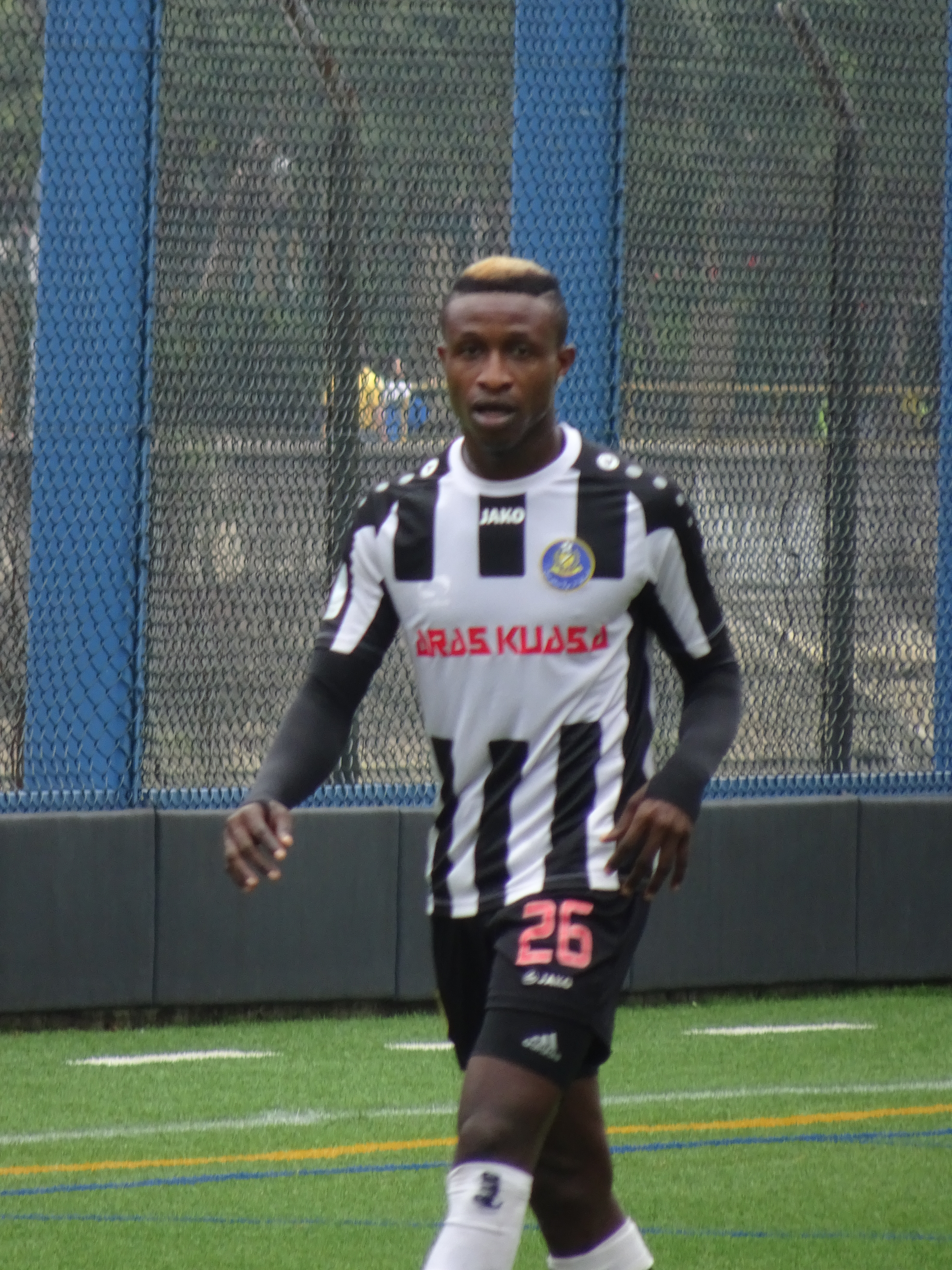
Sumareh playing for Sri Pahang in 2019

After helping Perlis reach in the sixth place in Malaysia Premier League, Sumareh joined Sri Pahang on a free transfer in December 2016 after signing a two-year deal with the Super League club. He made his club debut on 21 January 2017 in Super League Match against Perak away, which resulted in a 1–1 draw. His first Super League goal came on his Darul Makmur Stadium debut on 27 January 2017, in the 14th minute with a 5–0 victory against T–Team.

=== Police Tero ===
On 7 September 2020, Sumareh moved to Thailand to signed for Thai League 1 club, Police Tero. He make his debut for the club on 30 October 2020 in a league match against Suphanburi.

=== Johor Darul Ta'zim ===
On 9 February 2021, Sumareh joined Malaysia Super League club Johor Darul Ta'zim. On 2 April, he scored his first goal for the club in a 3–0 win over Melaka United. On 28 June, he made his AFC Champions League debut against Korean side Pohang Steelers.

On 7 October 2022, he made his 100th Malaysia Super League appearances against his former club Sri Pahang.

== International career ==
In October 2018, Sumareh was called up for the Malaysia national team central training from 8 October to prepare for two international friendly matches against Sri Lanka and Kyrgyzstan. He is the first player called to the Malaysia national team since the 1960s, who was neither born in Malaysia nor have any of his ancestors Malaysian-born or having Malaysian citizenship.

He made his debut on 12 October 2018, in a warm-up match against Sri Lanka. In that match, he came on as a substitute and scored his first international goal in a 4–1 victory. He later scored again in a 3–0 win against Maldives on 4 November 2018. A day later, Sumareh was selected to the 23-man squad for the 2018 AFF Championship.

On 5 September 2019, Sumareh scored a crucial last-minute goal against rivals Indonesia in the 2022 FIFA World Cup qualification match in which Malaysia won the match 2–3 at the Gelora Bung Karno Stadium in Jakarta. On 15 November 2019, he also scored the decisive goal that helped Malaysia win against Thailand 2–1 at the Bukit Jalil Stadium.

Sumareh also represented the nation at the 2023 AFC Asian Cup held in Qatar. He played in the group stage match against Jordan and Bahrain on 15 and 20 January 2024 respectively.

Sumareh was called up to the 2026 ASEAN Championship squad where he make his returned to the national team after a 2 years hiatus playing his first game on 25 July 2026 where he recorded an assist and won a penalty in a 2–1 win over Myanmar.

== Style of play ==
Sumareh is primarily deployed as a winger and is regarded for his direct attacking play and physical presence. Although his recent playing time has been limited, the national team management has identified his potential to contribute a different dynamic in offensive situations. He has been described as a player with confidence and the ability to adapt to various tactical setups.

== Personal life ==
Sumareh received his Malaysian citizenship in April 2018 after residing in the country for more than five years. He is a former student of Maz International School in Shah Alam and SEGi College.

== Career statistics ==
=== Club ===
As of match played 8 December 2024

Appearances and goals by club, season and competition
Club	Season	League			Cup		League Cup		Continental		Total	
Club	Season	Division	Apps	Goals	Apps	Goals	Apps	Goals	Apps	Goals	Apps	Goals
PDRM	2013	Malaysia Premier League	1	1	–		–				1	1
PDRM	2014	Malaysia Premier League	19	2	2	0	8	0			29	2
PDRM	2015	Malaysia Super League	20	3	2	0	6	3			28	6
PDRM	Total		40	6	4	0	14	3			58	9
Perlis	2016	Malaysia Premier League	19	5	2	0	–				21	5
Perlis	Total		19	5	2	0	–				21	5
Pahang	2017	Malaysia Super League	21	6	6	4	8	1			35	11
Pahang	2018	Malaysia Super League	17	3	7	1	8	0			32	4
Pahang	2019	Malaysia Super League	21	3	5	2	6	1			32	6
Pahang	2020	Malaysia Super League	3	0	0	0	0	0			3	0
Pahang	Total		62	12	18	7	22	2			102	21
Police Tero	2020–21	Thai League 1	4	0	0	0	0	0			4	0
Police Tero	Total		4	0	0	0	0	0			4	0
Johor Darul Ta'zim	2021	Malaysia Super League	11	3	–		8	0			19	3
Johor Darul Ta'zim	2022	Malaysia Super League	7	1	1	0	1	0			9	1
Johor Darul Ta'zim	2023	Malaysia Super League	0	0	0	0	0	0			0	0
Johor Darul Ta'zim	2024–25	Malaysia Super League	3	0	1	0	0	0			4	0
Johor Darul Ta'zim	2025–26	Malaysia Super League	0	0	0	0	0	0	2	0	2	0
Johor Darul Ta'zim	Total		21	4	2	0	9	0	2	0	32	4
Career total			146	27	26	7	45	5	0	0	217	39

=== International ===
As of 25 January 2024

Appearances and goals by national team and year
National team	Year	Apps	Goals
Malaysia	2018	10	2
Malaysia	2019	9	4
Malaysia	2021	3	0
Malaysia	2022	8	1
Malaysia	2023	1	0
Malaysia	2024	2	0
Total		33	7

As of match played 8 June 2022. Malaysia score listed first, score column indicates score after each Sumareh goal.

International goals by date, venue, cap, opponent, score, result and competition
No.	Date	Venue	Cap	Opponent	Score	Result	Competition
1	12 October 2018	Sugathadasa Stadium, Colombo, Sri Lanka	1	Sri Lanka	3–1	4–1	Friendly
2	3 November 2018	Bukit Jalil National Stadium, Kuala Lumpur, Malaysia	3	Maldives	3–0	3–0	Friendly
3	11 June 2019	Bukit Jalil National Stadium, Kuala Lumpur, Malaysia	14	Timor-Leste	3–0	5–1	2022 FIFA World Cup qualification
4	5 September 2019	Gelora Bung Karno Stadium, Jakarta, Indonesia	15	Indonesia	1–1	3–2	2022 FIFA World Cup qualification
5	5 September 2019	Gelora Bung Karno Stadium, Jakarta, Indonesia	15	Indonesia	3–2	3–2	2022 FIFA World Cup qualification
6	14 November 2019	Bukit Jalil National Stadium, Kuala Lumpur, Malaysia	18	Thailand	2–1	2–1	2022 FIFA World Cup qualification
7	11 June 2022	Bukit Jalil National Stadium, Kuala Lumpur, Malaysia	28	Bahrain	1–0	1–2	2023 AFC Asian Cup qualification

== Honours ==
=== Club ===
PDRM

- Malaysia Premier League: 2014
- People's Cup: 2015

Pahang

- Malaysia FA Cup: 2018, runner-up 2017

Johor Darul Ta'zim

- Malaysia Super League: 2021, 2022, 2023, 2024–25
- Malaysia FA Cup: 2022, 2023, 2024
- Malaysia Cup: 2022, 2023, 2024–25
- Piala Sumbangsih: 2022, 2023, 2024, 2025

=== International ===
Malaysia

- AFF Championship runners up: 2018

=== Individual ===
- 2018 AFF Championship: Best Eleven
- FAM Football Awards – Best Midfielder: 2019
