= Matthew Davies (footballer) =

Footballer (born 1995)

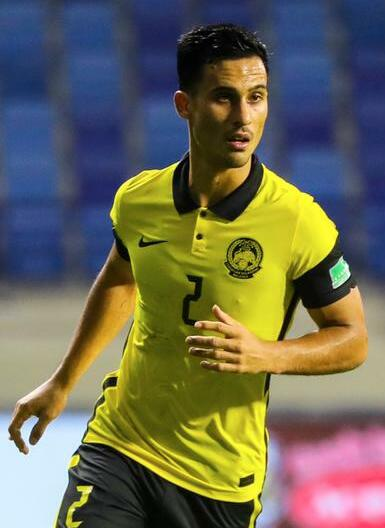
- Davies playing for Malaysia in 2021

Personal information
- Full name: Matthew Thomas Davies
- Date of birth: 7 February 1995 (age 31)
- Place of birth: Perth, Australia
- Height: 1.80 m (5 ft 11 in)
- Position: Right-back

Team information
- Current team: Johor Darul Ta'zim
- Number: 2

Youth career
- 2010–2012: A.I.S.
- 2012–2015: Perth Glory

Senior career*
Years	Team	Apps	(Gls)
2013–2015	Perth Glory	16	(0)
2014	Perth Glory NPL	5	(1)
2015–2019	Sri Pahang	92	(3)
2020–	Johor Darul Ta'zim	84	(2)

International career^{‡}
2013	Australia U19	5	(0)
2015–2018	Malaysia U23	15	(0)
2015–	Malaysia	58	(0)
Medal record
Men's football
Representing Malaysia
Merdeka Tournament
Winner	2024
King's Cup
Runner-up	2022
Malaysia U23
SEA Games
Silver medal – second place	2017 Kuala Lumpur	Football
- * Club domestic league appearances and goals as of 17 January 2026 ‡ National team caps and goals as of 11 June 2025

Matthew Thomas Davies (born 7 February 1995) is a professional footballer who plays primarily as a right-back for Malaysia Super League club Johor Darul Ta'zim. Born in Australia, he plays for and captains the Malaysia national team.

He started his professional career in his native Australia with Perth Glory at 18 years old. After playing for two seasons at Perth Glory, Davies went on to Sri Pahang in 2015 in the Malaysia Super League. After his first season, Davies was given captaincy for Sri Pahang at age 21 years old, making him the youngest captain ever for Sri Pahang and the first half-Malaysian to become captain in the Malaysia Super League.

Davies qualified for Malaysia through his mother, who hails from Sabah. He made his international debut with caretaker coach Ong Kim Swee against Saudi Arabia during the World Cup qualifiers in September 2015 at 20 years old. Davies also featured for Malaysia at the 2015 SEA Games in Singapore in June 2015.

== Early life ==
Born in Perth, Davies grew up playing football from a young age, stating that his brothers' participation in the sport encouraged him to play. Davies was raised in Australia, although he was able to obtain Malaysian citizenship through his mother.

Davies moved to Malaysia when he was 20 years old. "I left Australia because I'm impatient in nature ... I wanted playing time and I knew I wasn’t going to get much by staying in Australia", he said. "The opportunity to play international football for the country my mother was born in was too good to refuse. There are not many A-League regulars in the Socceroos".

== Club career ==
=== Youth ===
Davies started his career with the A.I.S in 2010. He captained the squad and was awarded player of the year and voted players player during his 2011/2012 NYL season with the AIS. Previously to this he was a product of the National Training Centre (NTC) programs in Western Australia.

=== Perth Glory ===
Davies signed for Perth Glory and played in the National Youth League for Perth Glory youth. In 2013–2014 season, Davies was promoted to the senior squad after signing a two-year contract with the club. He went on to make his senior debut against Melbourne City on 27 October 2013. He spent two years with Perth Glory accumulating 16 senior appearances.

=== Sri Pahang ===
In April 2015, Davies signed with Malaysia Super League club, Sri Pahang during the April transfer window. He was signed as a local player based on his Malaysian heritage. He made his league debut in a 2–0 away win against Kelantan on 11 April 2015. In February 2016, Davies became captain of the Malaysia Super League team, Sri Pahang shortly after the season had started. He is the youngest player ever to be given captaincy at just 21 years old and the first half-Malaysian to be given the honour in the Malaysia Super League, as he is half Australian and Malaysian.

Matthew Davies captained Sri Pahang to victory in 2018, becoming the Malaysian FA cup winners. Davies became the youngest captain in the history of the competition to lift the FA cup at just 23 years of age. The year before Davies narrowly missed the opportunity to obtain the credential at 22 years old after losing to Kedah Darul Aman.

On 15 February 2020, two weeks before the start of 2020 Malaysia Super League season, Davies officially left Sri Pahang after five seasons with the club.

=== Johor Darul Ta’zim ===
Davies joined Johor Darul Ta'zim prior to the 2020 Malaysia Super League season. It was not a surprise Johor snatched Davies after his success in both rival team Sri Pahang and the Malaysia national football team. Johor Darul Ta'zim owner Tunku Ismail Idris stated, “We have been keeping a close watch on him for the last three to four years but we decided to let him get experience with Sri Pahang before joining Johor Darul Ta'zim. “It's a great investment because he is just 25 years old and it’s a long term investment for JDT to improve the team. “We are grateful that there is a player who has a professional attitude and quality in our team.”

On 2 November 2023, Davies made his 100th appearance for the club in the second leg of the 2023 Malaysia Cup against Perak.

== International career ==
=== Australia U19 ===
Davies was selected for the U19 Young Socceroos squad to represent Australia at the COTIF Tournament in L'Alcúdia, Spain from 12 to 21 August in 2013.

=== Malaysia ===
==== Under-23 ====
An Australian by birth, he chose to represent Malaysia at the national level. He was eligible by virtue of his mother who was born in the Malaysian state of Sabah. He made his international debut for Malaysia's under-23 team at the 2015 Southeast Asian Games playing 4 out of 5 Group games. Malaysia finished third in their group and were unsuccessful in qualifying for the semifinal.

==== Senior ====
Davies is a regular for the national team, consistently being called up since his citizenship. He has only missed call ups due to injury. He debuted for the Malaysian national team on 8 September 2015 during the 2018 FIFA World Cup qualifying game against Saudi Arabia in a 1–2 loss. He's since made numerous appearances for the Malaysian national team including representing Malaysia at the 2016 AFF Championship. Davies was the team captain for the nation's 2023 AFC Asian Cup campaign in Qatar.

== Career statistics ==
=== Club ===
As of match played 11 January 2025

Appearances and goals by club, season and competition
Club	Season	League			National cup		League cup		Continental (Note: Includes AFC Champions League and AFC Cup)		Total	
Club	Season	Division	Apps	Goals	Apps	Goals	Apps	Goals	Apps	Goals	Apps	Goals
Perth Glory	2013–14	A-League	16	0	0	0	0	0	–		16	0
Perth Glory	2014–15	A-League	0	0	0	0	0	0	–		0	0
Perth Glory	Total		16	0	0	0	0	0	–		16	0
Sri Pahang	2015	Malaysia Super League	15	0	3	0	10	0	2	0	30	0
Sri Pahang	2016	Malaysia Super League	20	1	2	0	5	1	–		27	2
Sri Pahang	2017	Malaysia Super League	18	1	7	0	7	1	–		32	2
Sri Pahang	2018	Malaysia Super League	18	0	6	0	8	1	–		32	1
Sri Pahang	2019	Malaysia Super League	21	1	6	1	9	0	–		36	2
Sri Pahang	Total		92	3	24	1	39	3	2	0	157	7
Johor Darul Ta'zim	2020	Malaysia Super League	6	0	–		1	0	–		7	0
Johor Darul Ta'zim	2021	Malaysia Super League	15	1	–		9	0	5	0	29	1
Johor Darul Ta'zim	2022	Malaysia Super League	17	0	3 (Note: One appearance in 2022 Piala Sumbangsih; one appearance in 2022 Malaysia FA Cup)	0	0	0	5	0	25	0
Johor Darul Ta'zim	2023	Malaysia Super League	23	1	3	0	0	0	6	0	32	1
Johor Darul Ta'zim	2024–25	Malaysia Super League	13	0	5	0	0	0	2	0	20	0
Johor Darul Ta'zim	Total		74	2	11	0	10	0	18	0	112	2
Career total			182	5	35	1	49	3	20	0	286	9

=== International ===
As of match played 10 June 2025

Appearances and goals by national team and year
National team	Year	Apps	Goals
Malaysia	2015	5	0
Malaysia	2016	7	0
Malaysia	2017	2	0
Malaysia	2018	3	0
Malaysia	2019	12	0
Malaysia	2021	4	0
Malaysia	2022	6	0
Malaysia	2023	8	0
Malaysia	2024	8	0
Malaysia	2025	3	0
Total		58	0

== Honours ==
Sri Pahang

- Malaysia FA Cup: 2018

Johor Darul Ta'zim

- Malaysia Super League: 2020, 2021, 2022, 2023, 2024–25
- Malaysia Cup: 2022, 2023, 2024–25
- Piala Sumbangsih: 2020, 2021, 2022, 2023, 2024, 2025
- Malaysia FA Cup: 2022, 2023, 2024

Malaysia U-23

- SEA Games silver medal: 2017

Malaysia

- Pestabola Merdeka: 2024
- King's Cup runner-up: 2022

Individual

- FAM Football Awards – Best Young Player: 2015
- FAM Football Awards – Best Defender: 2017, 2021
