= La'Vere Corbin-Ong =

Malaysian footballer (born 1991)

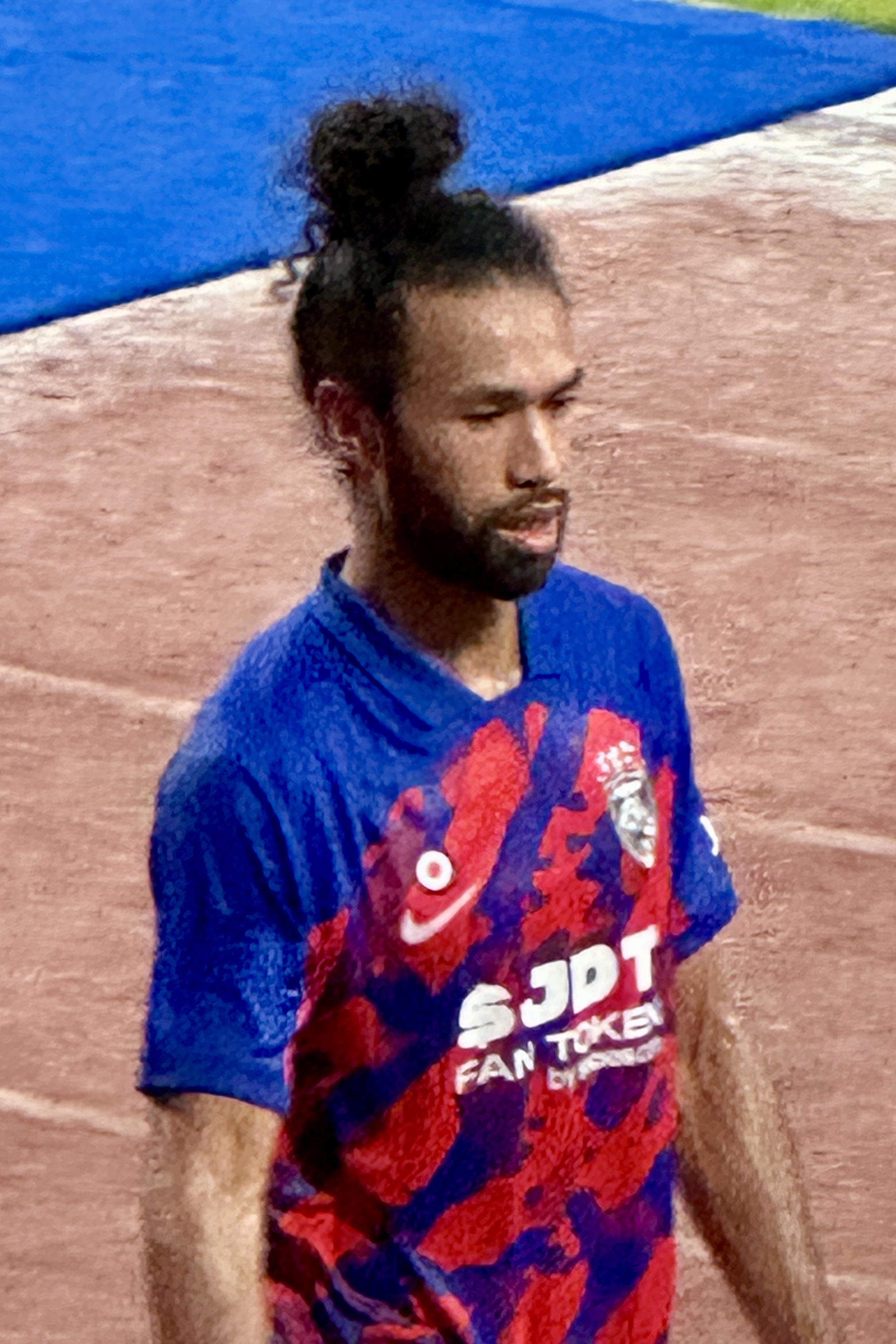
- Corbin-Ong with Johor Darul Ta'zim in 2024

Personal information
- Full name: La'Vere Lawrence Corbin-Ong
- Date of birth: 22 April 1991 (age 35)
- Place of birth: London, England
- Height: 1.84 m (6 ft 0 in)
- Position: Left-back

Team information
- Current team: Johor Darul Ta'zim
- Number: 22

Youth career
- 1997–2009: Lynn Valley SA
- 2010–2011: Vancouver Whitecaps

College career
Years	Team	Apps	(Gls)
2009–2010	Capilano Blues		

Senior career*
Years	Team	Apps	(Gls)
2010–2011	Vancouver Whitecaps	0	(0)
2010–2011	Vancouver Whitecaps Residency	29	(0)
2012–2014	Pommern Greifswald	57	(5)
2014–2016	Berliner AK 07	64	(4)
2016–2017	FSV Frankfurt	36	(0)
2017	Go Ahead Eagles	9	(0)
2018–	Johor Darul Ta'zim	122	(5)

International career^{‡}
2017	Canada	1	(0)
2019–	Malaysia	52	(6)
Medal record
Men's football
Representing Malaysia
FIFA ASEAN Cup
Third place	2026 Indonesia	Team
King's Cup
Runner-up	2022 Thailand	Team
Merdeka Tournament
Winner	2024 Malaysia	Team
- * Club domestic league appearances and goals as of 11 January 2025 ‡ National team caps and goals as of 6 October 2026

La'Vere Lawrence Corbin-Ong (born 22 April 1991) is a professional footballer who plays as a left-back for Malaysia Super League club Johor Darul Ta'zim. Born in England and raised in Canada, he plays for the Malaysia national team.

Corbin-Ong made one appearance for the Canada national team before switching to play for Malaysia, the country of his mother's birth, in 2019.

== Early life ==
Corbin-Ong was born in London, England, where his parents, Lawrence Corbin from Barbados and Elizabeth Ong from Malaysia, were studying psychiatry and nursing respectively. He was one year old when his family moved to Edmonton, the capital city of Alberta. When he was four years of age, his family moved to North Vancouver, where he was raised.

He played a variety of sports in his youth, including football, lacrosse, gridiron football and tennis. Corbin-Ong was six years old when he started playing football for the Lynn Valley SA.

He played for Capilano University in Canada for a season after high school, then joined the Vancouver Whitecaps Residency program. In 2012, he was set to attend the University of British Columbia and join their UBC Thunderbirds soccer team, but while waiting for the new season in five months went to Europe, where he got a tryout with German fifth tier side FC Pommern Greifswald.

== Club career ==
=== Vancouver Whitecaps Reserves ===
Corbin-Ong spent two years playing for the Whitecaps Reserves team, making 29 appearances for the club in 2010 and 2011, when the team competed in USL Premier Development League.

=== Pommern Greifswald ===
On 2 July 2012, Corbin-Ong moved to German fifth tier side Pommern Greifswald in the Oberliga Nord spending two seasons at the club. He make his club debut on 12 August 2012 in a league match against BFC Dynamo. On 30 March 2013, Corbin-Ong scored his first goal for the club against Anker Wismar which ended up in a 3–2 win.

=== Berliner AK 07 ===
In July 2014, Corbin-Ong moved to the fourth tier German club, Berliner AK 07 in the Regionalliga playing another two seasons with the club. On 3 August 2014, Corbin-Ong make his club debut against Germania Halberstadt. He would than scored his first goal for the club on 22 March 2015 scoring the only goal in the match against Wacker Nordhausen which earns his team the three points in the league. In the next match on 29 March, he scored another goal against VfB Auerbach in a 3–1 win.

On 25 August 2015, Corbin-Ong received the 'Man of the Match' award for putting up a magnificent performances in a 3–0 win against SV Babelsberg 03 where he was involved in all the goal scoring once and assisting twice.

=== FSV Frankfurt ===
After receiving interest from 2. Bundesliga club Union Berlin in 2015, Corbin-Ong signed with FSV Frankfurt in the 3. Liga in June 2016. He make his club debut on 30 July 2016 against Holstein Kiel.

=== Go Ahead Eagles ===
Corbin-Ong joined Eerste Divisie side Go Ahead Eagles on 3 July 2017. He make his debut for the club playing the entire 90th minute against FC Emmen on 22 August 2017. However, he was plagued by injuries during his time with the club and therefore make a total overall of 10 appearances for the club.

=== Johor Darul Ta'zim ===
On 24 November 2017, Corbin-Ong was signed by Malaysian Super League club Johor Darul Ta'zim. Due to Corbin-Ong's mother being from Malaysia, he was classified as a local player. He make his club debut in the 2018 Malaysia Super League season against Kedah FA on 3 February 2018 where he also assisted Marcos António to seal a 2–1 win. In the next match against PKNP on 6 February, he recorded another assist in a 3–0 win. On 14 February, Corbin-Ong played in the club AFC Cup match against Indonesian side Persija Jakarta in a fiercely battle that ended in a 2–0 win. On 5 May, he scored his first goal for the club against Negeri Sembilan in a 4–0 away win.

On 5 March 2019, Corbin-Ong played in the club AFC Champions League fixtures against Japanese side, Kashima Antlers.

On 14 April 2022, Corbin-Ong assisted twice in the club famous 5–0 victory over Chinese side, Guangzhou.

On 6 March 2023, Corbin-Ong scored his first brace in his career during a 7–0 thrashing victory against Negeri Sembilan.

== International career ==
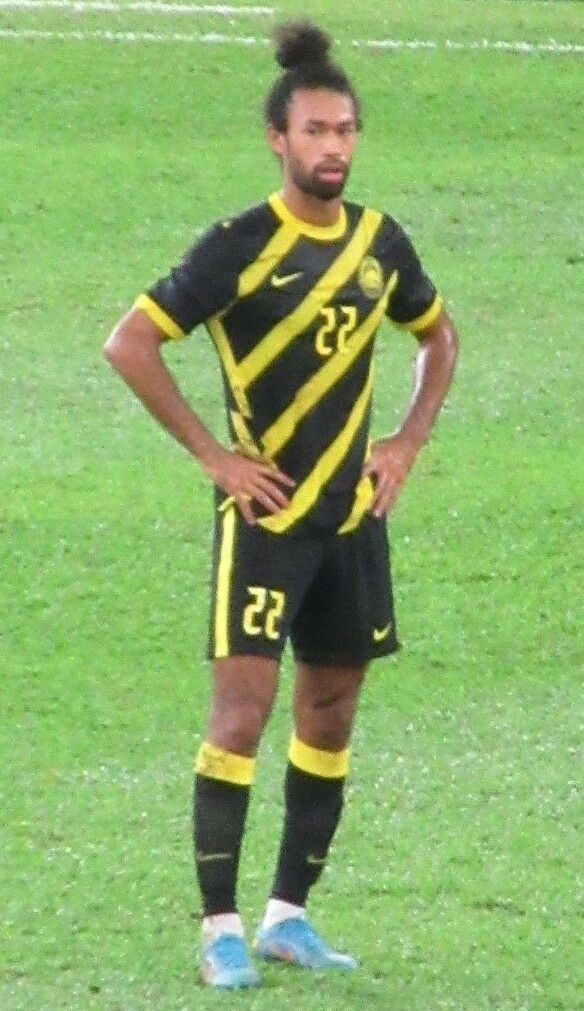
Corbin-Ong playing for Malaysia in 2022

=== Canada ===
In March 2017, Corbin-Ong received his first call-up to the Canada national team. He made his international debut when he came on a second-half substitute in a 1–1 friendly draw with Scotland.

=== Malaysia ===
In June 2019, Corbin-Ong made his Malaysia debut after starting in the friendly match against Nepal. He was allowed to switch allegiance to Malaysia as his previous appearance for Canada was in a friendly match. He scored his first international goal for Malaysia on 7 June 2019 in the FIFA World Cup Qualifier against Timor-Leste which Malaysia won 7–1.

On 8 June 2022, Corbin-Ong sealed the win by scoring the final goal in the 2023 AFC Asian Cup qualification match in a 3–1 win against Turkmenistan.

On 22 September 2022, he scored a goal against Thailand in the 2022 King's Cup.

Corbin-Ong represented the nation at the 2023 AFC Asian Cup held in Qatar where he played in all three matches during the group stage.

== Personal life ==
Corbin-Ong was born in London to a Barbadian father and a Malaysian Chinese mother, but moved to Canada at the age of one and is therefore eligible to play for Canada, England, Barbados and Malaysia internationally.

== Career statistics ==
=== Club ===
As of match played 11 January 2025

Appearances and goals by club, season and competition
Club	Season	League			National cup (Note: Includes DFB-Pokal, KNVB Cup, Malaysia Cup)		League cup (Note: Includes Malaysia FA Cup)		Continental		Total	
Club	Season	Division	Apps	Goals	Apps	Goals	Apps	Goals	Apps	Goals	Apps	Goals
Vancouver Whitecaps Residency	2010	Premier Development League	14	0	–		–		–		14	0
Vancouver Whitecaps Residency	2011	Premier Development League	15	0	–		–		–		15	0
Vancouver Whitecaps Residency	Total		29	0	–		–		–		29	0
Pommern Greifswald	2012–13	Oberliga Nord	28	1	0	0	–		–		28	1
Pommern Greifswald	2013–14	Oberliga Nord	29	4	0	0	–		–		29	4
Pommern Greifswald	Total		57	5	0	–		–		57	5	
Berliner AK 07	2014–15	Regionalliga Nordost	30	2	0	0	–		–		30	2
Berliner AK 07	2015–16	Regionalliga Nordost	34	2	0	0	–		–		34	2
Berliner AK 07	Total		64	4	0	0	–		–		64	4
FSV Frankfurt	2016–17	3. Liga	36	0	1	0	–		–		37	0
Go Ahead Eagles	2017–18	Eerste Divisie	9	0	1	0	–		–		10	0
Johor Darul Ta'zim	2018	Malaysia Super League	21	1	10	0	4	0	4 (Note: Appearances in AFC Champions League, appearances in AFC Cup)	0	39	1
Johor Darul Ta'zim	2019	Malaysia Super League	18	0	9	0	0	0	5 (Note: Appearances in AFC Champions League)	0	32	0
Johor Darul Ta'zim	2020	Malaysia Super League	11	0	1	0	0	0	2	0	14	0
Johor Darul Ta'zim	2021	Malaysia Super League	20	0	10	0	0	0	3	0	33	0
Johor Darul Ta'zim	2022	Malaysia Super League	22	0	6	0	4	0	5	0	37	0
Johor Darul Ta'zim	2023	Malaysia Super League	20	4	3	0	4	1	5	0	32	5
Johor Darul Ta'zim	2024–25	Malaysia Super League	10	0	1	0	0	0	0	0	11	0
Johor Darul Ta'zim	Total		122	5	40	0	12	1	24	0	198	6
Career total			317	14	42	0	12	1	24	0	395	15

=== International ===
As of 6 October 2026

Canada
Year	Apps	Goals
2017	1	0
Total	1	0

Malaysia
Year	Apps	Goals
2019	10	1
2021	3	0
2022	8	2
2023	10	1
2024	9	0
2025	6	2
2026	6	0
Total	52	6

International goals

As of match played 6 October 2026. Malaysia score listed first, score column indicates score after each Corbin-Ong goal.

International goals by date, venue, cap, opponent, score, result and competition
No.	Date	Venue	Cap	Opponent	Score	Result	Competition
1	7 June 2019	Bukit Jalil National Stadium, Bukit Jalil, Malaysia	2	Timor-Leste	1–0	7–1	2022 FIFA World Cup qualification
2	8 June 2022	Bukit Jalil National Stadium, Bukit Jalil, Malaysia	17	Turkmenistan	3–1	3–1	2023 AFC Asian Cup qualification
3	22 September 2022	700th Anniversary Stadium, Chiang Mai, Thailand	20	Thailand	1–0	1–1 (5–3 p)	2022 King's Cup
4	13 October 2023	Bukit Jalil National Stadium, Kuala Lumpur, Malaysia	28	India	4–2	4–2	2023 Merdeka Tournament
5	25 March 2025	Sultan Ibrahim Stadium, Iskandar Puteri, Malaysia	41	Nepal	2–0	2–0	2027 AFC Asian Cup qualification
6	10 June 2025	Bukit Jalil National Stadium, Bukit Jalil, Malaysia	42	Vietnam	3–0	4–0	2027 AFC Asian Cup qualification

== Honours ==
Johor Darul Ta'zim

- Malaysia Super League: 2018, 2019, 2020, 2021, 2022, 2023, 2024–25
- Malaysia FA Cup: 2022, 2023, 2024, 2025
- Malaysia Cup: 2019, 2022, 2023, 2024–25
- Piala Sumbangsih: 2018, 2019, 2020, 2021, 2022, 2023, 2024

Malaysia

- Pestabola Merdeka: 2024
- King's Cup runner-up: 2022

Individual

- Malaysia Super League Team of the Season: 2019, 2021, 2022, 2023
