= Enzo Lombardo =

French footballer (born 1997)

Personal information
- Date of birth: 16 April 1997 (age 29)
- Place of birth: Décines-Charpieu, France
- Height: 1.74 m (5 ft 9 in)
- Position: Midfielder

Team information
- Current team: Johor Darul Ta'zim
- Number: 7

Youth career
- Bourgoin-Jallieu
- Lyon
- 2013–2015: Saint-Priest

Senior career*
Years	Team	Apps	(Gls)
2015–2016	Saint-Priest	23	(2)
2016–2018	Mallorca B	43	(7)
2016–2017	→ Poblense (loan)	11	(1)
2018–2021	Mallorca	1	(0)
2018–2020	→ Racing Santander (loan)	61	(6)
2021–2024	Huesca	44	(0)
2024–	Johor Darul Ta'zim	3	(0)
- * Club domestic league appearances and goals as of 27 September 2024

Enzo Lombardo (born 16 April 1997) is a French professional footballer who plays as a midfielder for a Malaysia Super League club Johor Darul Ta'zim.

== Career ==
Lombardo was born in Décines-Charpieu, and began his career with Lyon. Released at the age of 16, he subsequently joined AS Saint-Priest, and made his senior debut with the Championnat de France Amateur club in the 2015–16 season.

On 28 June 2016, Lombardo joined RCD Mallorca and was initially assigned to the reserves in Segunda División B. The following 31 January, however, he was loaned to Tercera División side UD Poblense until June.

On 9 July 2018, after being a regular starter with Mallorca B, Lombardo was loaned to third division side Racing de Santander for the campaign. On 9 August of the following year, after achieving promotion to Segunda División, his loan was renewed for a further year.

Lombardo made his professional debut on 17 August 2019, starting in a 0–1 home loss against Málaga CF. He scored his first professional goals on 20 October, netting a brace in a 3–3 away draw against CD Tenerife.

In June 2020, Lombardo suffered a serious knee injury, which left him unregistered for the entire 2020–21 campaign. On 6 July 2021, he signed a three-year contract with SD Huesca also in the third division.

On 28 July 2024, Lombardo signed for Malaysia Super League club Johor Darul Ta'zim.

== Career statistics ==
As of 30 September 2024

Appearances and goals by club, season and competition
Club	Season	League			National cup		League cup		Continental		Other		Total	
Club	Season	Division	Apps	Goals	Apps	Goals	Apps	Goals	Apps	Goals	Apps	Goals	Apps	Goals
Racing de Santander (loan)	2018–19	La Liga	30	3	4	0	–		–		3 (Note: Appearances in promotion play-offs)	0	37	3
Racing de Santander (loan)	2019–20	Segunda División	31	3	0	0	–		–		–		31	3
Racing de Santander (loan)	Total		61	6	4	0	0	0	0	0	3	0	68	6
Huesca	2021–22	Segunda División	15	0	2	0	–		–		–		17	0
Huesca	2022–23	Segunda División	10	0	0	0	–		–		–		10	0
Huesca	2023–24	Segunda División	19	0	2	1	–		–		–		21	1
Huesca	2024–25	Segunda División	0	0	0	0	–		–		–		0	0
Huesca	Total		44	0	4	1	0	0	0	0	0	0	48	1
Johor Darul Ta'zim	2024–25	Malaysia Super League	3	0	0	0	0	0	0	0	–		3	0
Career total			108	0	8	1	0	0	0	0	3	0	119	1

== Honours ==
Johor Darul Ta'zim

- Malaysia Super League: 2024–25
- Malaysia FA Cup: 2024
- Malaysia Cup: 2024–25
- Piala Sumbangsih: 2024
