= Jalil Elías =

Syrian footballer (born 1996)

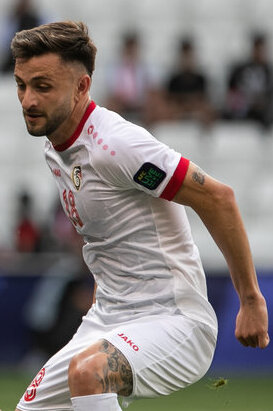
- Jalil playing.

Personal information
- Full name: Jalil Juan José Elías
- Date of birth: 25 April 1996 (age 30)
- Place of birth: Rosario, Argentina
- Height: 1.80 m (5 ft 11 in)
- Position: Defensive midfielder

Team information
- Current team: Estudiantes
- Number: 39

Youth career
- Newell's Old Boys

Senior career*
Years	Team	Apps	(Gls)
2015–2018	Newell's Old Boys	28	(0)
2018	→ Godoy Cruz (loan)	14	(0)
2018–2021	Godoy Cruz	25	(0)
2019–2020	→ Unión Santa Fe (loan)	21	(1)
2021–2024	San Lorenzo	94	(5)
2024–2025	Johor Darul Ta'zim	1	(0)
2024	→ Vélez Sarsfield (loan)	16	(0)
2025–2026	Tigre	28	(1)
2026–	Estudiantes	2	(0)

International career^{‡}
2024–	Syria	9	(0)
- * Club domestic league appearances and goals as of 17:43, 21 November 2026 (UTC) ‡ National team caps and goals as of 11 June 2024

Jalil Juan José Elías (Arabic: خليل خوان خوسيه إلياس; born 25 April 1996) is a professional footballer who currently plays as defensive midfielder for Estudiantes. Born in Argentina, he plays for the Syria national team.

== Club career ==
=== Newell's Old Boys ===
Elías' career started with Newell's Old Boys in 2015, beginning in the youth system. He was an unused substitute in two Argentine Primera División matches in June and October 2015 against Boca Juniors and Nueva Chicago respectively. His professional debut arrived on 23 November 2015, he played the full ninety minutes in a Copa Sudamericana qualification play-off with Lanús. He followed that with twenty-seven league appearances in his following three campaigns with Newell's Old Boys between 2016 and 2017. He scored his first career goal on 11 June 2017 in a Copa Argentina win over Central Norte.

=== Godoy Cruz ===
In January 2018, Elías joined Godoy Cruz on loan until June 2019. Prior to departing, he signed a new contract with Newell's Old Boys until 2021. Like with his parent club, his debut for Godoy Cruz came versus Lanús. He appeared fourteen times for Godoy, with the club subsequently signing him permanently in the following August. He made thirty appearances in the 2018–19 season.

=== Unión Santa Fe ===
Prior to leaving the club on loan in July 2019 to Unión Santa Fe. Elías scored one goal across one season with them; he netted in a 3–3 draw away to Banfield on 3 November. In mid-2020, he was linked with a transfer to Italy with Parma.

=== San Lorenzo ===
On 10 February 2021, Elías joined San Lorenzo on a permanent deal. Starting from the 2023 Argentine Primera División, he was made the vice-captain of the club.

=== Johor Darul Ta'zim ===
On 4 January 2024, Elías signed with the Malaysian club Johor Darul Ta'zim. He made his debut for the club on 18 May 2024 in a 3–1 win over Negeri Sembilan.

==== Vélez Sarsfield ====
On 10 August 2024, Elías returned to Argentina, joining Vélez Sarsfield on a six-month loan from Johor Darul Ta'zim.

=== Tigre ===
On 1 August 2025, Elías joined Tigre as a free agent, signing a contract until the end of 2026.

== International career ==
Born in Argentina, Elías is of Syrian descent. In December 2023, he was called up to the Syrian national team for the 2023 AFC Asian Cup in Qatar.

== Career statistics ==
As of 27 January 2025.

Appearances and goals by club, season and competition
Club	Season	League			Cup		League Cup		Continental (Note: Includes Copa Libertadores and Copa Sudamericana.)		Other		Total	
Club	Season	Division	Apps	Goals	Apps	Goals	Apps	Goals	Apps	Goals	Apps	Goals	Apps	Goals
Newell's Old Boys	2015	Primera División	0	0	0	0	—		—		1 (Note: Appearance(s) in the Primera División play-offs)	0	1	0
Newell's Old Boys	2016	Primera División	9	0	0	0	—		—		0	0	9	0
Newell's Old Boys	2016–17	Primera División	14	0	1	1	—		—		0	0	15	1
Newell's Old Boys	2017–18	Primera División	4	0	1	0	—		0	0	0	0	5	0
Newell's Old Boys	Total		27	0	2	1	—		0	0	1	0	30	1
Godoy Cruz (loan)	2017–18	Primera División	14	0	0	0	—		—		0	0	14	0
Godoy Cruz	2018–19	Primera División	20	0	2	0	2	0	6	0	0	0	30	0
Godoy Cruz	2020–21	Primera División	11	0	1	0	0	0	0	0	0	0	12	0
Godoy Cruz	Total		45	0	3	0	2	0	6	0	0	0	56	0
Unión Santa Fe (loan)	2019–20	Primera División	21	1	1	0	1	0	2	0	0	0	25	1
San Lorenzo	2021	Primera División	24	1	2	0	—		6	0	—		32	1
San Lorenzo	2022	Primera División	32	1	1	0	—		—		—		33	1
San Lorenzo	2023	Primera División	38	3	4	0	—		10	0	—		52	3
San Lorenzo	Total		94	5	7	0	—		16	0	—		117	5
Johor Darul Ta'zim	2024–25	Malaysia Super League	1	0	0	0	—		—		—		1	0
Vélez Sarsfield (loan)	2024	Primera División	16	0	3	0	—		—		—		19	0
Career total			204	6	16	1	3	0	24	0	1	0	248	7

== Honours ==
Vélez Sarsfield

- Argentine Primera División: 2024
