= Murilo (footballer, born December 1995) =

Brazilian footballer

Personal information
- Full name: Murilo Henrique de Araujo Santos
- Date of birth: 2 December 1995 (age 30)
- Place of birth: Espírito Santo, Brazil
- Height: 1.80 m (5 ft 11 in)
- Position: Left-back

Team information
- Current team: SJK
- Number: 14

Youth career
- 2013: Rio Ave
- 2013–2014: Varzim

Senior career*
| Years | Team | Apps | (Gls) |
| 2014 | Varzim B | 2 | (0) |
| 2015–2016 | Rio Branco-ES | 4 | (0) |
| 2016–2017 | Cultural Areas | 1 | (1) |
| 2017–2020 | Ourense | 61 | (2) |
| 2020–2021 | SJK | 35 | (2) |
| 2022 | HJK | 19 | (0) |
| 2023 | SJK | 26 | (0) |
| 2024–2025 | Johor Darul Ta'zim | 4 | (1) |
| 2025 | SJK | 7 | (0) |
| 2026 | Rio Branco | 10 | (0) |
| 2026– | SJK | 7 | (1) |
- * Club domestic league appearances and goals as of 13 November 2026

Murilo Henrique de Araujo Santos (born 2 December 1995), simply known as Murilo, is a Brazilian professional footballer who plays as a left-back for SJK.

== Club career ==
=== Youth ===
Revealed in the youth categories of Linhares. After a junior career in Portugal, a country which citizenship Murilo also holds, Murilo moved back to Brazil to play in the Brazilian Serie D, and joined the ranks of Rio Branco.

=== Cultural Areas ===
After his short tenure in Brazil, Murilo returned to Europe to join Spanish fifth division Cultural Areas in July 2016.

=== Ourense ===
In July 2017, Murilo joined Ourense, where he played for four seasons.

=== SJK Seinäjoki ===
On 27 August 2020, Murilo was spotted by scouts and was offered a contract by Veikkausliiga side SJK Seinäjoki.During the 2020 Veikkausliiga season, he appeared in ten matches. During the following 2021 season, Murilo broke through, appearing in 25 of 27 Veikkausliiga matches. Murilo recorded eight assists and one goal in all competitions as SJK placed third.

=== HJK Helsinki ===
On 5 November 2021, Murilo signed a two-year contract with HJK. During the 2022 season, Murilo recorded 19 matches and 5 assists in the league. He also scored a vital free-kick goal in the first round of 2022–23 UEFA Champions League qualifying against FK Rīgas Futbola Skola, which tied the leg, which HJK went on to win on penalties, one of which Murilo scored. HJK ended up qualifying for the Europa League, however, Murilo only played in the first match, against Real Betis, coming on as a sub in the 76th minute.

=== Return to SJK Seinäjoki ===
Murilo returned to SJK ahead of the 2023 season. Despite not scoring in the 2023 season, Murilo provided ten assists in total for his team. On 2 January 2024, it was announced that Murilo will leave the club.

=== Johor Darul Ta'zim ===
On 23 January 2024, Murilo moved to Malaysia to signed a contract with Johor Darul Ta'zim in the Malaysian Super League.

=== Fourth spell at SJK ===
On 24 July 2026, Murilo joined SJK for the fourth time signing af contract until the end of 2026.

== Career statistics ==
As of 20 August 2023

Appearances and goals by club, season and competition
| Club | Season | League | | | Cup | | League Cup | | Continental | | Total | |
| Club | Season | Division | Apps | Goals | Apps | Goals | Apps | Goals | Apps | Goals | Apps | Goals |
|---|---|---|---|---|---|---|---|---|---|---|---|---|
| Varzim B | 2014–15 | Porto FA Elite Division | 2 | 0 | – | | – | | – | | 2 | 0 |
| Rio Branco-ES | 2015 | Série D | 4 | 0 | 0 | 0 | – | | – | | 4 | 0 |
| Rio Branco-ES | 2016 | | | | 1 (Note: Appearances in the Copa do Brasil) | 0 | – | | – | | 1 | 0 |
| Rio Branco-ES | Total | | 4 | 0 | 1 | 0 | 0 | 0 | 0 | 0 | 5 | 0 |
| Cultural Areas | 2016–17 | Tercera División | 1 | 1 | 0 | 0 | – | | – | | 1 | 1 |
| Ourense | 2017–18 | Tercera División | 13 | 0 | 0 | 0 | – | | – | | 13 | 0 |
| Ourense | 2018–19 | Tercera División | 28 | 1 | 0 | 0 | – | | – | | 28 | 1 |
| Ourense | 2019–20 | Tercera División | 20 | 1 | 0 | 0 | – | | – | | 20 | 1 |
| Ourense | Total | | 61 | 2 | 0 | 0 | 0 | 0 | 0 | 0 | 61 | 3 |
| SJK Seinäjoki | 2020 | Veikkausliiga | 10 | 1 | 0 | 0 | – | | – | | 10 | 1 |
| SJK Seinäjoki | 2021 | Veikkausliiga | 25 | 1 | 5 | 0 | – | | – | | 30 | 1 |
| SJK Seinäjoki | Total | | 35 | 2 | 5 | 0 | 0 | 0 | 0 | 0 | 40 | 2 |
| HJK Helsinki | 2022 | Veikkausliiga | 19 | 0 | 2 | 0 | 2 | 0 | 9 (Note: Includes UEFA Champions League and UEFA Europa League) | 1 | 32 | 1 |
| SJK Seinäjoki | 2023 | Veikkausliiga | 26 | 0 | 1 | 0 | 0 | 0 | – | | 27 | 0 |
| Johor Darul Ta'zim | 2024–25 | Malaysia Super League | 4 | 1 | 5 | 0 | – | | 8 (Note: Appearances in AFC Champions League Elite) | 0 | 17 | 1 |
| SJK Seinäjoki | 2025 | Veikkausliiga | 0 | 0 | 0 | 0 | 0 | 0 | 0 | 0 | 0 | 0 |
| Career total | | | 152 | 6 | 13 | 0 | 2 | 0 | 17 | 1 | 193 | 8 |

== Honours ==
HJK Helsinki

- Veikkausliiga: 2022

Johor Darul Ta'zim

- Malaysia Super League: 2024–25
- Malaysia FA Cup: 2024
- Malaysia Cup: 2024–25
- Piala Sumbangsih: 2024
