= 2022 Piala Sumbangsih =

Johor Darul Ta'zim	Kuala Lumpur City
3	0
- Date: 26 February 2022
- Venue: Sultan Ibrahim Stadium, Iskandar Puteri
- Man of the Match: Fernando Forestieri
- Referee: Nazmi Nasaruddin
- Attendance: 15,485
- Weather: Good; 30 °C (86 °F)

The 2022 Piala Sumbangsih was the 37th edition of the Piala Sumbangsih, an annual football match played between the winners of the previous season's Malaysia Super League and Malaysia Cup. The match was played between Johor Darul Ta'zim, who were the champions of the 2021 Malaysia Super League, and Kuala Lumpur City, who were the winners of the 2021 Malaysia Cup. It was held at the Sultan Ibrahim Stadium in Johor.

Johor Darul Ta'zim won the match 3–0 and clinched their seventh title.

== Match details ==
26 February 2022
21:00 UTC+8

Johor Darul Ta'zim	3−0	Kuala Lumpur City
Nazmi 26'; Forestieri 31'; Afiq 85'	Report

Sultan Ibrahim Stadium, Iskandar Puteri, Johor
Attendance: 15,485
Referee: Nazmi Nasaruddin

Johor Darul Ta'zim	Kuala Lumpur City

GK	1	(Malaysia) Farizal Marlias (c)
LB	14	(Australia) Shane Lowry
CB	23	(Philippines) Carli de Murga
RB	2	(Malaysia) Matthew Davies		(substituted off) 90+1'
LM	22	(Malaysia) La'Vere Corbin-Ong
CM	30	(Malaysia) Natxo Insa		(substituted off) 90'
CM	10	(Argentina) Leandro Velázquez		(substituted off) 72'
RM	42	(Malaysia) Arif Aiman		(substituted off) 72'
LW	45	(Italy) Fernando Forestieri
CF	9	(Brazil) Bergson da Silva
RW	21	(Malaysia) Nazmi Faiz		(substituted off) 65'
Substitutions:
MF	4	(Malaysia) Afiq Fazail		(substituted on) 65'
MF	6	(England) Hong Wan		(substituted on) 90'
DF	7	(Malaysia) Aidil Zafuan
FW	11	(Malaysia) Safawi Rasid		(substituted on) 72'
FW	17	(Malaysia) Ramadhan Saifullah	(yellow card) 77'	(substituted on) 72'
MF	19	(Malaysia) Akhyar Rashid
GK	26	(Malaysia) Haziq Nadzli
DF	32	(Malaysia) Shahrul Saad		(substituted on) 90+1'
DF	91	(Malaysia) Syahmi Safari
Manager:
(Mexico) Benjamin Mora

GK	1	(Philippines) Kevin Ray Mendoza	(yellow card) 23'
LB	12	(Malaysia) Declan Lambert		(substituted off) 82'
CB	9	(Australia) Giancarlo Gallifuoco
CB	21	(Malaysia) Kenny Pallraj		(substituted off) 41'
RB	4	(Malaysia) Kamal Azizi
LM	19	(Malaysia) Partiban Janasekaran		(substituted off) 67'
CM	6	(Malaysia) Ryan Lambert		(substituted off) 82'
CM	14	(Malaysia) Akram Mahinan
RM	8	(Malaysia) Zhafri Yahya	(yellow card) 77'
CF	28	(Brazil) Paulo Josué (c)
CF	11	(Republic of the Congo) Kevin Koubemba
Substitutes:
FW	10	(Malaysia) Safee Sali
MF	7	(Colombia) Romel Morales
DF	17	(Malaysia) Irfan Zakaria		(substituted on) 41'
DF	25	(Malaysia) Anwar Ibrahim
MF	27	(Malaysia) Hadin Azman	(yellow card) 74'	(substituted on) 67'
DF	33	(Malaysia) Muhammad Faudzi
FW	37	(Malaysia) Haqimi Azim Rosli		(substituted on) 82'
GK	44	(Malaysia) Azri Ghani
MF	66	(Malaysia) Nabil Hakim		(substituted on) 82'
Manager:
(Croatia) Bojan Hodak

Man of the Match:
Fernando Forestieri (Johor Darul Ta'zim)

Assistant referees:
Mohamad Zairul Khalil Tan
Hamdi Haji Omar
Fourth official:
Firdaus Dahlan
Additional assistant referees:
S. Logeswaran
Abdul Rahman Wahab

Match rules

- 90 minutes
- 30 minutes of extra time if necessary
- Penalty shoot-out if scores still level
- Nine named substitutes

== Winners ==
2022 Piala Sumbangsih

Johor Darul Ta'zim
Seventh title
