= Ramadhan Saifullah =

Malaysian footballer

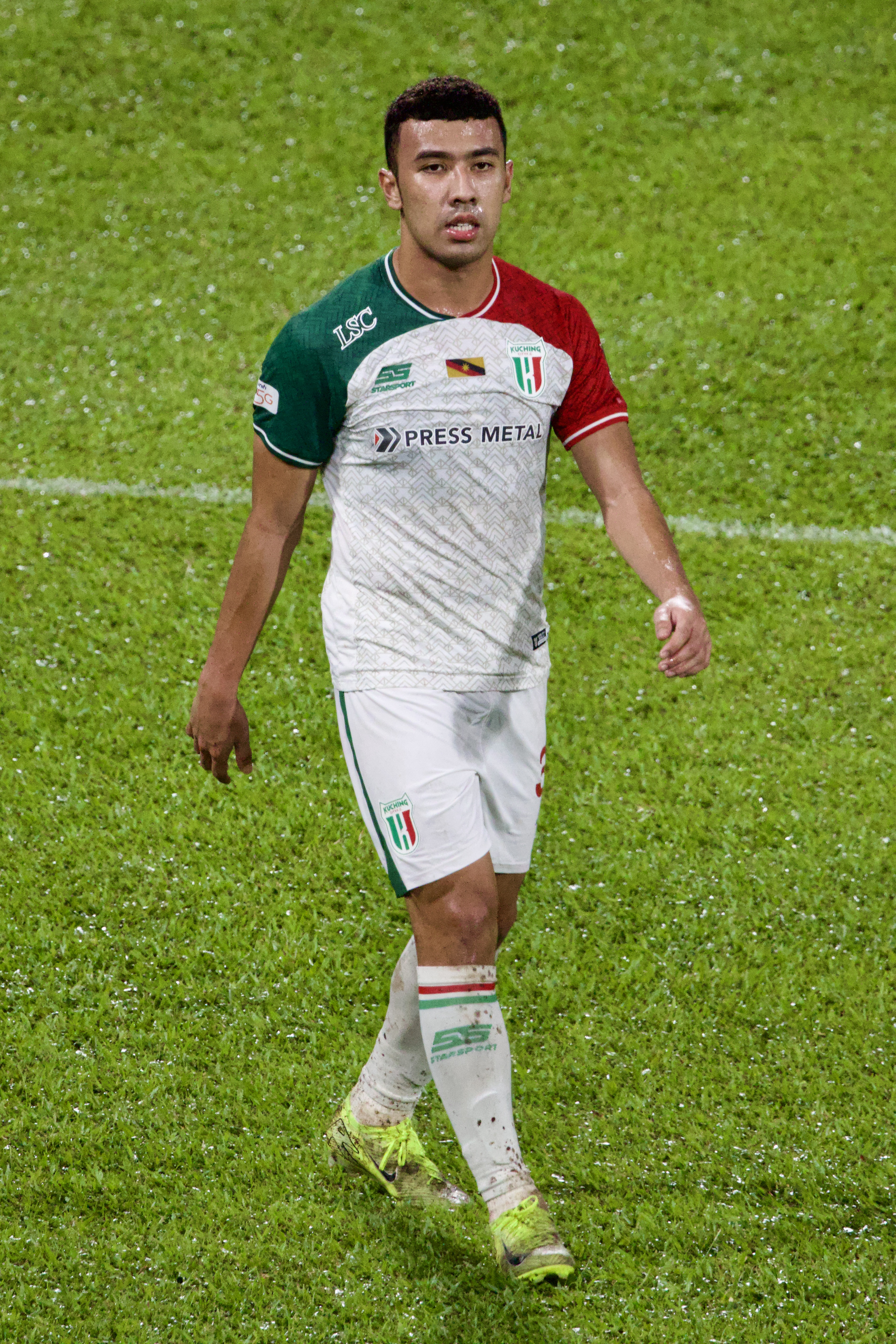
- Ramadhan with Kuching City in 2025

Personal information
- Full name: Muhammad Ramadhan Saifullah bin Usman
- Date of birth: 9 December 2000 (age 25)
- Place of birth: Johor Bahru, Malaysia
- Height: 1.75 m (5 ft 9 in)
- Position: Winger

Team information
- Current team: Kuching City
- Number: 7

Youth career
- 2017–2020: Johor Darul Ta'zim

Senior career*
| Years | Team | Apps | (Gls) |
| 2020–2025 | Johor Darul Ta'zim | 36 | (4) |
| 2024–2025 | → Kuching City (loan) | 12 | (3) |
| 2025– | Kuching City | 23 | (7) |

International career^{‡}
| 2018 | Malaysia U19 | 3 | (0) |
| 2025– | Malaysia | 6 | (0) |
- * Club domestic league appearances and goals as of 25 May 2026 ‡ National team caps and goals as of 17 November 2026

Muhammad Ramadhan Saifullah bin Usman (born 9 December 2000) is a Malaysian professional footballer who plays as a winger for Malaysian Super League side Kuching City and the Malaysia national team.

== Early life ==
From a young age, Ramadhan played in the evening with his peers. Then, his parents sent him to the J-Kids football academy when he was around 11–12 years old to further develop his footballing potential. Around 2015 to 2016, Ramadhan's talent began to develop while studying at SMK Bandar Uda Utama.

== Club career ==
=== Youth ===
He was named in Mencari Ramli 5 program's Most Valuable Player. He had previously played in a friendly in Manchester.

=== Johor Darul Ta'zim ===
==== 2020 season ====
Being a Johor Darul Ta'zim Academy graduate, he made his debut against Pahang in 2020 Malaysia Super League and also scored his first goal. He finished his season with 4 goals to his name.

==== 2021 season ====
Ramadhan scored his first goal in a AFC Champions League match against Nagoya Grampus. However, he did not manage to score in any league matches during the 2021 Malaysia Super League campaign due to his injuries. He was flown to Barcelona to receive his treatment and rehabilitation.

=== Kuching City ===
==== 2024–25 season ====
In his first season on loan at Kuching City, Ramadhan rediscovered his form and became one of the stand-out players for the team, thanks to his superb close control, dribbling, and passing ability. He was nominated in the Best Striker category for the National Football Awards.

==== 2025–26 season ====
After the permanent transfer from Johor Darul Ta'zim FC to Kuching City, Ramadhan continued his fine form, earning him his debut international cap with the Malaysian national team against Laos. Appearing 35 times in all competitions, with nine goals and 12 assists, Ramadhan helped Kuching City finish at its best-ever position of 2nd place in the 2025–26 Malaysia Super League, qualifying for the AFC Champions League Two for the first time in club history. Kuching City also reached its first-ever final in the Piala Malaysia, however they ultimately lost to Johor Darul Ta'zim FC after a missed penalty in the 61st minute.

== International career ==
In 2018, Ramadhan was a member of Malaysia's squad for the AFC U-19 tournament in Indonesia.

In March 2022, he was called up to the Malaysia national football team training camp ahead of friendly matches against the Philippines, Singapore, and Albirex Niigata Singapore.

In October 2025, he was again called up to the national team training camp ahead of the 2027 AFC Asian Cup qualification matches against Laos. He made his international debut on 9 October 2025 at the New Laos National Stadium.

== Career statistics ==
As of 25 May 2026

| Club | Season | League | | | Cup | | Continental | | Other | | Total | |
| Club | Season | Division | Apps | Goals | Apps | Goals | Apps | Goals | Apps | Goals | Apps | Goals |
|---|---|---|---|---|---|---|---|---|---|---|---|---|
| Johor Darul Ta'zim | 2020 | Malaysia Super League | 7 | 4 | 0 | 0 | — | | 0 | 0 | 7 | 4 |
| Johor Darul Ta'zim | 2021 | Malaysia Super League | 10 | 0 | 0 | 0 | 6 (Note: Appearances in the AFC Champions League) | 1 | 0 | 0 | 16 | 1 |
| Johor Darul Ta'zim | 2022 | Malaysia Super League | 11 | 0 | 1 | 0 | 6 | 1 | 0 | 0 | 18 | 1 |
| Johor Darul Ta'zim | 2023 | Malaysia Super League | 8 | 0 | 0 | 0 | 0 | 0 | 0 | 0 | 8 | 0 |
| Kuching City (loan) | 2024–25 | Malaysia Super League | 12 | 3 | 0 | 0 | — | | 4 (Note: Appearances in the Malaysia Cup) | 2 | 16 | 5 |
| Kuching City | 2025–26 | Malaysia Super League | 23 | 7 | 6 | 1 | — | | 6 | 1 | 35 | 9 |
| Career total | | | 71 | 14 | 7 | 1 | 12 | 2 | 4 | 2 | 94 | 19 |

=== International ===
As of match played 25 May 2026

Appearances and goals by national team and year
| National team | Year | Apps | Goals |
|---|---|---|---|
| Malaysia | 2025 | 4 | 0 |
| Total | | 2 | 0 |

== Honours ==
=== Club ===
Johor Darul Ta'zim

- Malaysia Super League: 2020, 2021, 2022, 2023
- Malaysia FA Cup: 2022, 2023, 2024
- Malaysia Cup: 2019, 2022, 2023
- Malaysia Charity Shield: 2021, 2022, 2023
