= 2024 Piala Sumbangsih =

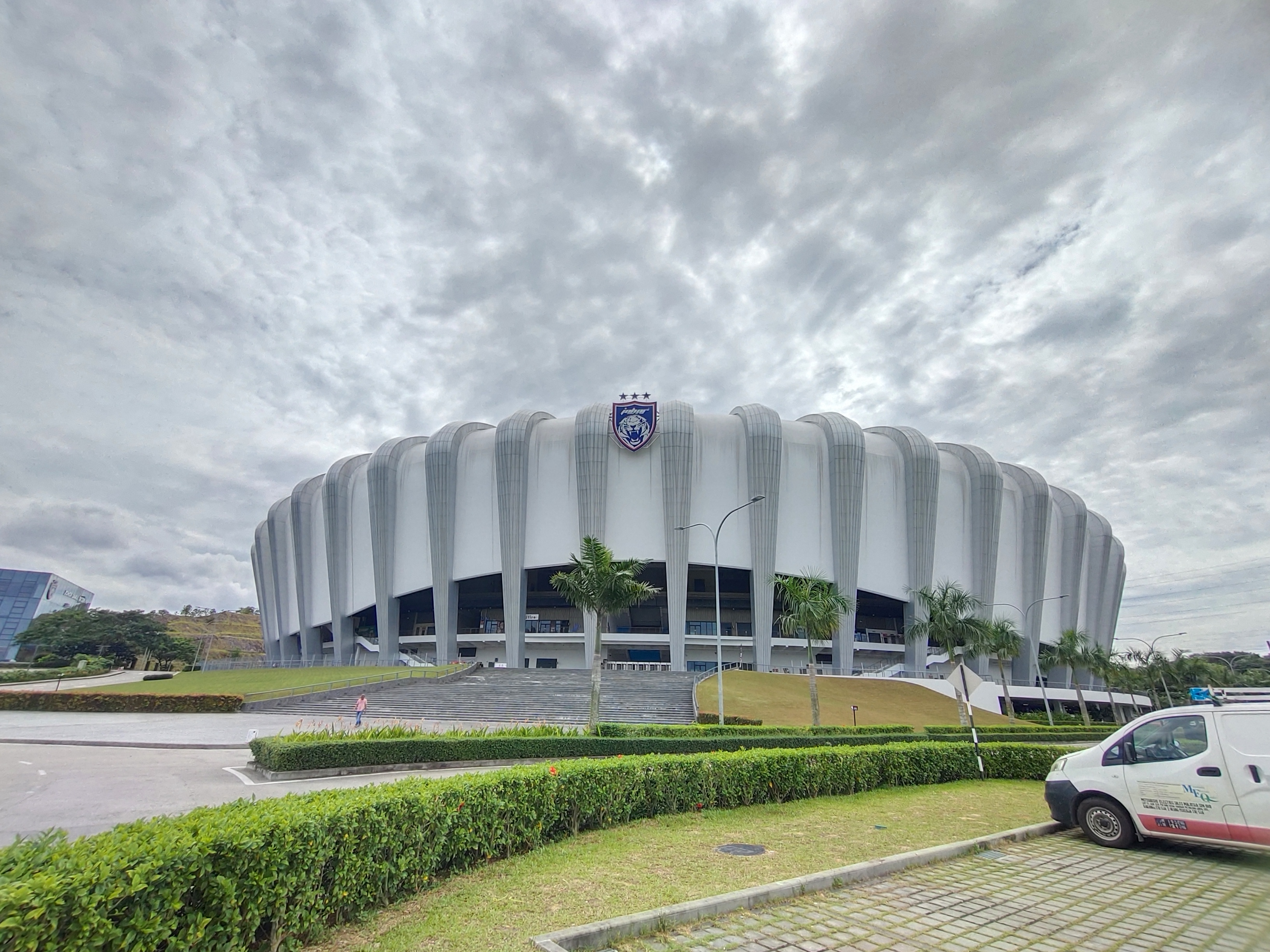
- Sultan Ibrahim Stadium was scheduled to host the match
Johor Darul Ta'zim	Selangor
3	0
- Awarded
- Date: 10 May 2024
- Venue: Sultan Ibrahim Stadium, Iskandar Puteri, Johor

The 2024 Piala Sumbangsih (also known as Malaysian Charity Shield) was the scheduled 39th edition of the Malaysian Charity Shield, an annual football match played between the winners of the previous season's Malaysia Super League and Malaysia FA Cup. As Johor Darul Ta'zim won the domestic treble (Note: Winners of the 2023 Malaysia Super League, 2023 Malaysia FA Cup, and 2023 Malaysia Cup.) in the previous season, their opponents should have been the 2023 Malaysia Super League runners-up, Selangor.

The match was scheduled to be played at the Sultan Ibrahim Stadium on 10 May 2024. It was also scheduled to feature a video assistant referee (VAR) review system for the first time in the Malaysian League system.

On 8 May 2024, Selangor announced their withdrawal from the Charity Shield match due to safety concerns following a series of criminal incidents and threats involving several players and team officials, including their player, Faisal Halim, who was a victim of criminal activity and suffered fourth-degree burns after being attacked with acid. Following Selangor's withdrawal, the match was officially cancelled by the Malaysian Football League (MFL). As the match also counted as the first round of 2024–25 Malaysia Super League season, it was registered as a 3–0 victory for Johor Darul Ta'zim.

== Background ==
Selangor was set to make their first Charity Shield appearance since 2016, when they lost to the same opponent 7–6 on penalties after a 1–1 draw in the regular time. Following JDT's domestic treble season, Selangor qualified for the 2024 Piala Sumbangsih as runners-up of the 2023 Malaysia Super League. Selangor were looking to win the Charity Shield for the first time since 2010, when they beat Negeri Sembilan 2–1 at Tuanku Abdul Rahman Stadium.

Johor Darul Ta'zim qualified for their tenth consecutive Charity Shield match as winners of the 2023 Malaysia Super League.

== Match ==
=== Details ===
10 May 2024
21:00 UTC+08:00

Johor Darul Ta'zim	3–0 (w/o)	Selangor

Sultan Ibrahim Stadium, Iskandar Puteri

Match rules

- 90 minutes
- Penalty shoot-out if scores still level
- Nine named substitutes, of which six may be used
