= Ziad El Basheer =

Malaysian footballer (born 2003)

Personal information
- Full name: Ziad El Basheer bin Norhisham
- Date of birth: 24 December 2003 (age 22)
- Place of birth: Selangor, Malaysia
- Height: 1.74 m (5 ft 8 1/2 in)
- Position: Midfielder

Team information
- Current team: Johor Darul Ta'zim II
- Number: 12

Youth career
- 2016–2020: Mokhtar Dahari Academy
- 2021–2022: Johor Darul Ta'zim

Senior career*
Years	Team	Apps	(Gls)
2022–	Johor Darul Ta'zim II	28	(2)

International career^{‡}
2022	Malaysia U19	5	(0)
2022	Malaysia U20	3	(0)
2025–	Malaysia U23	6	(1)
2026–	Malaysia	2	(0)
Medal record
Men's football
Representing Malaysia
Malaysia U-19
ASEAN U-19 Boys' Championship
Winner	2022
Malaysia U-22
Merlion Cup
Winner	2023
- * Club domestic league appearances and goals as of 2 September 2026 ‡ National team caps and goals as of 2 September 2026

Ziad El Basheer bin Norhisham (born 24 December 2003), simply known as Ziad El Basheer, is a Malaysian professional footballer who plays as a midfielder for Malaysia A1 Semi-Pro League club Johor Darul Ta'zim II and the Malaysia national team.

== Youth career ==
During his youth, Ziad enrolled in Malaysia Pahang Sports School and, along with Najmuddin Akmal, was part of the U-14 "A" team that made it to the finals of the Piala KPM, a major football youth tournament organised by the Ministry of Education.

Ziad represented Mokhtar Dahari Academy in the Supermokh U-14 Cup in 2017, scoring the first goal in a 1–1 draw against the U-14 team of French giants Paris Saint-Germain.

== Club career ==
=== Johor Darul Ta'zim II ===
Ziad represented Johor Darul Ta'zim as a youth player until he was promoted to Johor Darul Ta'zim II in 2022.

Ziad won the 2024–25 MFL Cup after defeating Penang FC II 4–0 on the last matchday.

== International career ==
=== Youth ===
Ziad was part of the Malaysian 2025 ASEAN U-23 Championship squad that finished third in their group behind Indonesia and Philippines.

On the 69th minute, Ziad scored the seventh goal in a 7–0 rout against Mongolia in the second group stage match of the 2026 AFC U-23 Asian Cup qualification process.

=== Senior ===
On 11 July 2026, Ziad El Basheer was called up for the first time by Malaysia interim manager Tan Cheng Hoe for the 25-man final squad list for the 2026 ASEAN Championship.

On 16 August 2026, Ziad made his senior debut by coming on as a substitute for Sergio Agüero in the 85th minute in the first leg semi-final tie against Vietnam. Three days later, he made his first start for the national team in the second leg, playing for 89 minutes at the Mỹ Đình National Stadium.

== Career statistics ==
=== International ===
As of match played 2 September 2026

Appearances and goals by national team and year
National team	Year	Apps	Goals
Malaysia U23	2025	3	0
Malaysia U23	2026	1	1
Malaysia	2026	2	0
Total		6	1

== Honours ==
JDT II

- MFL Cup: 2024–25

Malaysia U19

- AFF U19 Youth: 2022

Malaysia U23

- Merlion Cup: 2023
