= 2022 PDRM FC season =

Polis Di-Raja Malaysia
2022 season
- President: Acryl Sani Abdullah Sani
- CEO: Mohamad Hafiz Zainal Abidin
- Head coach: Wan Rohaimi Wan Ismail (until 29 August 2022); Jamadi Razak (started 29 August 2022)
- Stadium: Kuala Lumpur Stadium
- Malaysia Premier League: 6th (promoted)
- Malaysia FA Cup: First round
- Malaysia Cup: Round of 16
- Top goalscorer: League: Martin Adamec (8 goals); All: Martin Adamec (8 goals)
Home colours	Away colours	Third colours

The 2022 season was Polis Di-Raja Malaysia Football Club's 32nd in existence and 13th in the second-tier of Malaysian football. The club competed in Malaysia Premier League, the Malaysia FA Cup and the Malaysia Cup.

== Players ==
=== First-team squad ===
Note: Flags indicate national team as defined under FIFA eligibility rules; some limited exceptions apply. Players may hold more than one non-FIFA nationality.

No.	Pos.	Nation	Player
1	GK	(Malaysia) MAS	Julian Bechler
3	DF	(Malaysia) MAS	Azmi Muslim (on loan from Penang)(captain)
5	DF	(Malaysia) MAS	Che Mohamad Safwan
6	MF	(Malaysia) MAS	Saiful Hasnol
8	MF	(Ghana) GHA	Alexander Amponsah (vice-captain)
10	MF	(Malaysia) MAS	Khairul Izuan
11	MF	(Slovakia) SVK	Martin Adamec
13	MF	(Malaysia) MAS	Durrkeswan Ganasan
16	FW	(Malaysia) MAS	Syafiq Azmi
17	MF	(Malaysia) MAS	Amirul Wa'ie
18	MF	(Malaysia) MAS	Mu'az Zainal Abidin
19	DF	(Malaysia) MAS	Amir Saiful
20	FW	(Malaysia) MAS	Fairuz Ramli
21	FW	(Malaysia) MAS	Khaizuran Putera
22	FW	(Malaysia) MAS	Ismail Ibrahim

No.	Pos.	Nation	Player
23	MF	(Malaysia) MAS	Zazrir Naim
24	MF	(Malaysia) MAS	Sachin Samuel
25	DF	(Malaysia) MAS	Amier Ali
26	DF	(Malaysia) MAS	Alif Naquiddin
28	MF	(Malaysia) MAS	Azrie Reza
30	FW	(Malaysia) MAS	Nabil Latpi
32	MF	(Malaysia) MAS	Safiee Ahmad
33	GK	(Malaysia) MAS	Asri Muhamad
35	GK	(Malaysia) MAS	Firdaus Irman
40	DF	(Malaysia) MAS	Izzat Zuhairie
45	FW	(Malaysia) MAS	Alif Hasmardi
48	MF	(Malaysia) MAS	Asyraf Kamal Tajul' Ariffin
77	MF	(Jordan) JOR	Fadi Awad (on loan from Al-Wehdat)
88	MF	(Malaysia) MAS	Ammar Akhmal
91	FW	(Slovakia) SVK	Miloš Lačný

=== Transfers in ===
Note: Flags indicate national team as defined under FIFA eligibility rules; some limited exceptions apply. Players may hold more than one non-FIFA nationality.

No.	Pos.	Nation	Player
1	GK	(Malaysia) MAS	Julian Bechler (from Kuala Lumpur City)
3	DF	(Malaysia) MAS	Azmi Muslim (on loan from Penang)
5	DF	(Malaysia) MAS	Che Mohamad Safwan (from Kelantan)
10	MF	(Malaysia) MAS	Khairul Izuan (unattached, previously at UiTM FC)
11	MF	(Slovakia) SVK	Martin Adamec (from Pohronie)
18	MF	(Malaysia) MAS	Mu'az Zainal Abidin (from Penang)
22	FW	(Malaysia) MAS	Ismail Ibrahim (from Kelantan)
23	MF	(Malaysia) MAS	Zazrir Naim (from Sri Pahang)
28	MF	(Malaysia) MAS	Azrie Reza (from Penang, previously on loan)
35	GK	(Malaysia) MAS	Firdaus Irman (from Selangor 2)
25	DF	(Malaysia) MAS	Amier Ali (from Perak)
—	MF	(Malaysia) MAS	Adib Hakimi (from Selangor 2)
77	MF	(Jordan) JOR	Fadi Awad (on loan from Al-Wehdat)
91	FW	(Slovakia) SVK	Miloš Lačný

=== Transfers out ===
Note: Flags indicate national team as defined under FIFA eligibility rules; some limited exceptions apply. Players may hold more than one non-FIFA nationality.

No.	Pos.	Nation	Player
—	FW	(Japan) JPN	Bruno Suzuki
—	FW	(Namibia) NAM	Lazarus Kaimbi (to Madura United)

== Competitions ==
=== Malaysia Premier League ===
20 March 2022 1	Perak	1–3	PDRM

27 March 2022 2	PDRM	0–1	Kelantan United

10 April 2022 3	PDRM	2–1	Terengganu II

16 April 2022 4	Selangor 2	4–1	PDRM

24 April 2022 5	PDRM	1–3	Kelantan

28 April 2022 6	PDRM	2–2	Kuching City

7 May 2022 7	Johor Darul Ta'zim II	5–1	PDRM

21 May 2022 8	PDRM	1–0	FAM-MSN Project

28 May 2022 9	UiTM	1–1	PDRM

25 June 2022 10	Kuching City	2–1	PDRM

3 July 2022 11	PDRM	2–0	Perak

16 July 2022 12	Kelantan United	1–1	PDRM

26 July 2022 13	Terengganu II	0–2	PDRM

9 August 2022 14	PDRM	1–0	Selangor 2

13 August 2022 15	Kelantan	2–1	PDRM

21 August 2022 16	PDRM	0–3	Johor Darul Ta'zim II

3 September 2022 17	FAM-MSN Project	1–0	PDRM

17 September 2022 18	PDRM	0–1	UiTM

Pos	Team	Pld	W	D	L	GF	GA	GD	Pts	Qualification or relegation
4	Terengganu II (Note: Johor Darul Ta'zim II, Selangor II, and Terengganu II aren't eligible to promote as their parent clubs (Johor Darul Ta'zim, Selangor, and Terengganu) play in the Super League. These feeder teams can only play in leagues below their parents'. They also can't play in the Malaysian Cup as they're only eligible to play in the Malaysian Cup if their parents fail to do so (which is not possible currently).)	18	10	3	5	29	18	+11	33	Relocated to MFL Cup
5	Kelantan United	18	6	7	5	23	19	+4	25	Promotion to Super League and Qualification to Malaysia Cup
6	PDRM	18	6	3	9	20	28	−8	21	Promotion to Super League and Qualification to Malaysia Cup
7	UiTM (D)	18	6	2	10	18	25	−7	20	Withdrawn from Liga Super and relegated to Al-ikhsan Cup (Note: UiTM FC withdrew from Liga Super before the start of 2023 season.)
8	Selangor II	18	4	4	10	14	25	−11	16	Relocated to MFL Cup

Updated to match(es) played on 4 September 2022. Source: MFL
Rules for classification: 1) Points; 2) Goal difference; 3) Number of goals scored.
(D) Disqualified

=== Malaysia FA Cup ===
23 March 2022 First round	PDRM	0–2	Perlis United

=== Malaysia Cup ===
Round of 16

27 October 2022 First leg	PDRM	0–3	Kuala Lumpur City

1 November 2022 Second leg	Kuala Lumpur City	1–0 (3–0 agg.)	PDRM

== Statistics ==
=== Appearances and goals ===
No.	Pos	Nat	Player	Total		League		FA Cup		Malaysia Cup	
No.	Pos	Nat	Player	Apps	Goals	Apps	Goals	Apps	Goals	Apps	Goals
Goalkeepers
33	GK	(Malaysia) MAS	Asri Muhamad	12	0	11	0	1	0	0	0
35	GK	(Malaysia) MAS	Firdaus Irman	10	0	7+1	0	0	0	2	0
Defenders
3	DF	(Malaysia) MAS	Azmi Muslim	11	1	8+1	1	0	0	2	0
4	DF	(Malaysia) MAS	Syafiq Izzudin	2	0	0+2	0	0	0	0	0
5	DF	(Malaysia) MAS	Che Mohamad Safwan	7	0	3+2	0	1	0	1	0
19	DF	(Malaysia) MAS	Amir Saiful	16	0	10+3	0	1	0	1+1	0
25	DF	(Malaysia) MAS	Amier Ali	12	0	10+2	0	0	0	0	0
26	DF	(Malaysia) MAS	Alif Naquiddin	12	0	9+2	0	0	0	1	0
40	DF	(Malaysia) MAS	Izzat Zuhairie	15	0	8+4	0	1	0	1+1	0
Midfielders
6	MF	(Malaysia) MAS	Saiful Hasnol	8	0	7	0	0	0	1	0
8	MF	(Ghana) GHA	Alexander Amponsah	19	0	16	0	1	0	2	0
11	MF	(Slovakia) SVK	Martin Adamec	20	8	17	8	1	0	2	0
13	MF	(Malaysia) MAS	Durrkeswan Ganasan	21	2	16+2	2	0+1	0	0+2	0
14	MF	(Malaysia) MAS	Nurfais Johari	4	0	1+2	0	1	0	0	0
17	MF	(Malaysia) MAS	Amirul Wa'ie	20	0	9+8	0	0+1	0	1+1	0
18	MF	(Malaysia) MAS	Mu'az Zainal Abidin	16	0	5+10	0	0+1	0	0	0
22	MF	(Malaysia) MAS	Azrul Fahriz	3	0	1+1	0	0	0	0+1	0
23	MF	(Malaysia) MAS	Zazrir Naim	2	0	0	0	0	0	1+1	0
24	MF	(Malaysia) MAS	Sachin Samuel	3	0	0+3	0	0	0	0	0
28	MF	(Malaysia) MAS	Azrie Reza	15	2	9+4	2	1	0	1	0
30	MF	(Malaysia) MAS	Nabil Latpi	18	3	7+8	3	0+1	0	1+1	0
32	MF	(Malaysia) MAS	Safiee Ahmad	20	0	17	0	1	0	1+1	0
48	MF	(Malaysia) MAS	Asyraf Kamal Tajul' Ariffin	5	0	2+2	0	0	0	1	0
77	MF	(Jordan) JOR	Fadi Awad	10	0	8	0	0	0	2	0
88	MF	(Malaysia) MAS	Ammar Akhmal	4	0	0+3	0	0+1	0	0	0
Forwards
7	FW	(Malaysia) MAS	Amirul Azman	2	0	0+2	0	0	0	0	0
10	FW	(Malaysia) MAS	Khairul Izuan	3	0	1+2	0	0	0	0	0
16	FW	(Malaysia) MAS	Syafiq Azmi	3	0	1+2	0	0	0	0	0
21	FW	(Malaysia) MAS	Khaizuran Putera	2	0	1+1	0	0	0	0	0
27	FW	(Kyrgyzstan) KGZ	Mirbek Akhmataliyev	8	2	6+1	2	1	0	0	0
37	FW	(Malaysia) MAS	Amirul Amaran	2	0	0+2	0	0	0	0	0
91	FW	(Slovakia) SVK	Miloš Lačný	8	2	7	2	0	0	1	0
Players transferred out during the season
10	MF	(Kyrgyzstan) KGZ	Semetey Daniyarov	2	0	1	0	1	0	0	0
23	MF	(Malaysia) MAS	Adib Hakimi	1	0	0+1	0	0	0	0	0

Last updated: 1 November 2022
Source: Competitions
