= Gabriel Nistelrooy =

Malaysian footballer (born 2000)

Personal information
- Full name: Gabriel Nistelrooy anak Tamin
- Date of birth: 25 April 2000 (age 26)
- Place of birth: Miri, Sarawak, Malaysia
- Height: 1.84 m (6 ft 0 in)
- Position: Forward

Team information
- Current team: Kuching City (on loan from Johor Darul Ta'zim)
- Number: 19

Youth career
- 2016–2018: Kolej Vokasional Miri
- 2018: PP MSN Miri
- 2019: Johor Darul Ta'zim IV
- 2020: Johor Darul Ta'zim III

Senior career*
Years	Team	Apps	(Gls)
2020–	Johor Darul Ta'zim II	50	(24)
2024–	Johor Darul Ta'zim	0	(0)
2025–	→ Kuching City (loan)	13	(2)
- * Club domestic league appearances and goals as of 2 July 2024

Gabriel Nistelrooy anak Tamin (born 25 April 2000) is a Malaysia professional footballer who plays for Malaysia Super League side Kuching City, on loan from Johor Darul Ta'zim.

== Career statistics ==
As of 2 July 2024

Appearances and goals by club, season and competition
Club	Season	League			Cup		League Cup		Others (Note: Including AFC Champions League)		Total	
Club	Season	Division	Apps	Goals	Apps	Goals	Apps	Goals	Apps	Goals	Apps	Goals
Johor Darul Ta'zim II	2020	Malaysia Premier League	3	0	—						3	0
Johor Darul Ta'zim II	2021	Malaysia Premier League	8	2	—						8	2
Johor Darul Ta'zim II	2022	Malaysia Premier League	16	4	—						16	4
Johor Darul Ta'zim II	2023	—	19	13	—						19	13
Johor Darul Ta'zim II	2024–25	—	4	5	—						4	5
Total			50	24	−						50	23
Johor Darul Ta'zim	2024–25	Malaysia Super League	0	0	0	0	0	0	0	0	0	0
Kuching City	2025–26	Malaysia Super League	13	2	4	1	2	0	0	0	19	3
Career Total			69	27							69	27

== Honours ==
=== Club ===
Johor Darul Ta'zim II

- Malaysia Premier League: 2022
- MFL Cup: 2024–25

=== Individual ===
- MFL Cup Golden Boot Winner: 2024–25 (24 goals)
