= Yusri Che Lah =

Malaysian footballer and coach

Personal information
- Full name: Yusri bin Che Lah
- Date of birth: 29 April 1976 (age 50)
- Place of birth: Kangar, Perlis, Malaysia
- Position: Midfielder

Senior career*
Years	Team	Apps	(Gls)
1996–1999	Perlis	??	(12)
2000–2002	Selangor		(12)
2003	Perak		(3)
2004–2005	Perlis		(10)
2005–2006	MPPJ		(1)
2006–2007	Perak		(3)
2007	Perlis	??	(2)

International career
1999–2001	Malaysia	3	(2)

Managerial career
- 2014–2015: Perlis
- 2015–2017: Felcra
- 2018: Kelantan (assistant coach)
- 2018: Kelantan (interim head coach)
- 2019: Kuala Lumpur
- 2019–2020: Kelantan
- 2021: Projek FAM-MSN
- 2022: Perak
- 2023: Perak II
- 2023–2025: Perak
- 2025–2026: Immigration
- * Club domestic league appearances and goals

Yusri bin Che Lah (born 29 April 1976) is a Malaysian coach and former professional footballer who played as a midfielder.

== Playing career ==
Born in Kangar, Perlis, Yusri played and captained for hometown side Perlis in the Malaysia Super League. He was formerly with Selangor, MPPJ and Perak before retiring when he played for his former club, Perlis. He represented Malaysia from 1999 until 2001. He made his international debut with the Malaysia senior team in the 1999 Dunhill Cup, although it is not a FIFA 'A' international match. In 2000, he scored two goals in a 6–0 win over Myanmar in a friendly match, which were his only international goals. His last appearance was at the 2001 Merdeka Tournament.

== Managerial career ==
Yusri started his managerial career as Perlis U21 team head coach in 2014. In 2015, Yusri was appointed to Malaysia FAM League side Perlis first team. In 2016, he signed a contract with Felcra. On 1 July 2017, his contract with Felcra was terminated. In November 2017, Yusri joined Malaysia Super League side Kelantan as an assistant coach under Sathit Bensoh for 2018 Malaysia Super League.

In 2018, Yusri held the head coach role in a caretaker capacity twice: first when Bensoh resigned in February and again when his replacement Fajr Ibrahim also resigned in June. Despite his best efforts, he failed to avoid Kelantan's relegation to Malaysia Premier League that year, after finishing bottom of the table.

Kelantan agreed with Yusri orally to extend his contract for one more year on 20 November, but after Kelantan failed to provide Yusri with an official contract, he signed for Kuala Lumpur FA on 5 December. On 11 March 2019, he resigned because poor results. On 15 April 2019, Yusri was appointed head coach of Kelantan FA. After finishing sixth in the truncated 2020 Malaysia Premier League because of COVID-19 restrictions, Kelantan announced Yusri's contract would not be renewed beyond that season.

Yusri then was appointed as head coach of the FAM-NSC Project team, a team composed of national U-23 players which plays in the Malaysia Premier League. Yusri resigned at the end of 2021 Malaysia Premier League season, with the team finishing last in the league.

After the resignation of Yusri from FAM-MSN Project team, Perak FC appointed him their new head coach for the 2022 Malaysia Premier League season. With the newly relegated team management and financial problems, which saw the team have points deducted by the league for unpaid salaries to team players and staffs, hit by a ban on transfer of players, and a change of team ownership, Yusri managed Perak to go only one better than the previous year, finishing second last above his former team FAM-MSN Project. At the end of the season, Yusri was reassigned to coach Perak's U-23 team in a shakeup of the team coaching staff, which saw Lim Teong Kim replacing Yusri as the Perak main team head coach. Yusri was then appointed by Perak to replace Lim Teong Kim, who had his contract terminated, as interim head coach of Perak for the rest of the season starting from May 25

== Managerial statistics ==
As of 9 June 2026

Managerial record by team and tenure
Team	Nat.	From	To	Record					Ref.
Team	Nat.	From	To	G	W	D	L	Win %	Ref.
Perlis	(Malaysia)	1 December 2014	15 October 2015	20	12	6	2	60.00	
Felcra	(Malaysia)	1 January 2016	1 July 2017	35	19	7	9	54.29	
Kelantan (caretaker)	(Malaysia)	15 February 2018	19 March 2018	4	2	0	2	50.00	
Kelantan (caretaker)	(Malaysia)	5 June 2018	4 December 2018	17	6	3	8	35.29	
Kuala Lumpur	(Malaysia)	5 December 2018	11 March 2019	5	0	0	5	0.00	
Kelantan	(Malaysia)	15 April 2019	30 November 2020	28	9	7	12	32.14	
FAM-MSN Project	(Malaysia)	10 December 2020	10 December 2021	20	1	3	16	5.00	
Perak	(Malaysia)	1 January 2022	17 September 2022	20	6	2	12	30.00	
Perak	(Malaysia)	25 May 2023	31 May 2025	49	16	9	24	32.65	
Immigration	(Malaysia)	1 August 2025	9 June 2026	30	10	6	14	33.33	
Career Total				228	81	43	104	35.53	

== Honours ==
=== Player ===
Selangor

- Malaysia Premier 1: 2000
- Malaysia FA Cup: 2001
- Malaysia Cup: 2002
- Malaysia Charity Shield: 2002

Perak

- Malaysia Premier 1: 2003

Perlis

- Malaysia Cup: 2004
- Malaysia Super League: 2005

=== Manager ===
Perlis

- Malaysia FAM League runner-up: 2015
