= Najmuddin Akmal =

Malaysian footballer (born 2003)

Muhammad Najmuddin Akmal
Personal information
- Full name: Muhammad Najmuddin Akmal bin Kamal Akmal
- Date of birth: 11 January 2003 (age 23)
- Place of birth: Malaysia
- Height: 1.65 m (5 ft 5 in)
- Position: Defender

Team information
- Current team: Johor Darul Ta'zim II
- Number: 7

Youth career
- Johor Darul Ta'zim youth

Senior career*
Years	Team	Apps	(Gls)
2022–	Johor Darul Ta'zim II		

International career^{‡}
2018–2020	Malaysia U16		
2021–2022	Malaysia U19		
2023–	Malaysia U23	12	(2)
2024–	Malaysia	2	(0)
Medal record
Men's football
Representing Malaysia
Malaysia U-19
ASEAN U-19 Boys' Championship
Winner	2022
Malaysia U-22
Merlion Cup
Winner	2023
- * Club domestic league appearances and goals ‡ National team caps and goals as of 14 December 2024

Muhammad Najmuddin Akmal bin Kamal Akmal (born 11 January 2003) simply known as Najmuddin Akmal, is a Malaysian professional footballer who currently plays as a defender for Malaysia A1 Semi-Pro League club Johor Darul Ta'zim II and the Malaysia national team. Mainly a defender, he is also capable of playing occasionally as a right-midfielder and right-winger.

== Club career ==
=== Johor Darul Ta'zim II ===
Najmuddin started his career as a youth player for Johor Darul Ta'zim. In 2022, he was promoted to Johor Darul Ta'zim II to compete in the MFL Cup.

For the MFL Cup, Najmuddin led Johor Darul Ta'zim II to become champion the 2024–25 MFL Cup. He scored his first hat-trick of the season after heading the ball in after finishing off Shahrul's pass in the penalty box to beat Haziq Mukriz. Johor Darul Ta'zim II won 7–0 over Penang II.

== International career ==
=== Youth ===
In 2018, Najmuddin was selected for the 2018 AFC U-16 Championship held in Malaysia. However, Malaysia U16 failed to advance to the next round and finished bottom of the group.

For Malaysia U19, Najmuddin has also been selected to compete in the 2022 AFF U-19 Youth Championship. He has brought Malaysia win 2–0 over Laos in the final to be crowned champions for the second time at the Patriot Stadium.

For Malaysia U23, Najmuddin participated in the 2023 Merlion Cup campaign held in Singapore. He successfully led Malaysia U23 to become the Merlion Cup champion and scored the opening goal for Malaysia with a header in the 74th minute. Malaysia U23 defeated Hong Kong U23 with a score of 2–1.

Apart from that, Najmuddin was also selected for the 2023 SEA Games. Immediately after that, Malaysia U23 missed the opportunity to advance to the next stage and ended up in third place in the group.

=== Senior ===
In December 2024, Najmuddin has received a call-up from the Malaysia national team for the first time to face the 2024 ASEAN Championship. He made two appearances in the tournament.

In his first debut, he was selected in the match against Timor Leste and Malaysia won with a score of 3–2 at Bukit Jalil National Stadium. In his second match, he was introduced in the second half to replace Jimmy Raymond in the 85th minute against Thailand.

== Career statistics ==
=== International ===
As of match played 14 December 2024

Appearances and goals by national team and year
National team	Year	Apps	Goals
Malaysia	2024	2	0
Total		2	0

== Honours ==
JDT II

- MFL Cup: 2024–25

Malaysia U19

- AFF U19 Youth: 2022

Malaysia U23

- Merlion Cup: 2023
