= 2021 Malaysia Premier League =

Malaysia Premier League
- Season: 2021
- Dates: 6 March – 24 September 2021
- Champions: Negeri Sembilan; 2nd Second Division title
- Promoted: Negeri Sembilan; Sarawak United
- Relegated: Perak II
- Matches: 109
- Goals: 288 (2.64 per match)
- Top goalscorer: Jordan Mintah; Fernando Rodríguez (16 goals)
- Biggest home win: 7 goals Sarawak United 7–1 FAM-MSN Project (10 April 2021)
- Biggest away win: 6 goals FAM-MSN Project 1–6 Terengganu II (7 May 2021)
- Highest scoring: 8 goals Sarawak United 7–1 FAM-MSN Project (10 April 2021)
- Longest winning run: 5 matches Terengganu II
- Longest unbeaten run: 14 matches Terengganu II
- Longest winless run: 17 matches FAM-MSN Project
- Longest losing run: 6 matches FAM-MSN Project

The 2021 Malaysia Premier League is the 18th season of the Malaysia Premier League, the second-tier professional football league in Malaysia since its establishment in 2004.

First and second place non-feeder team will be promoted to the 2022 Malaysia Super League. The top 5 non-feeder teams will qualify for the 2021 Malaysia Cup.

== Team changes ==
A total of 11 teams contested the league, including 9 sides from the 2020 season, 1 relegated from the 2020 Malaysia Super League, and 1 team formed by FAM and National Sports Council Malaysia (NSC).

=== To Premier League ===
Relegated from Super League

- Felda United(disqualified)^{2}
- PDRM

Promoted from Liga M3

- No teams.^{1}

New Team

- FAM-MSN Project^{3}

=== From Premier League ===
Promoted to Super League

- Penang
- Kuala Lumpur

Relegated to Liga M3

- No teams.^{4}

Expulsion

- UKM(disqualified)^{5}

Renamed/Rebranded Clubs

- Kelantan FA separate and formed Kelantan FC
- Kuching FA separate and formed Kuching City FC
- Negeri Sembilan FA separate and formed Negeri Sembilan FC
- PDRM FA separate and formed Polis Diraja Malaysia FC

Notes:

^1No teams from M3 League were promoted due to the 2020 M3 League season cancellation.
^2Felda United's application for privatization was not approved by Football Association of Malaysia and therefore the team not qualified to participating in the league.
^3FAM-MSN Project were a development team form by FAM and National Sports Council Malaysia (NSC) as alternative career pathway for the NFDP graduates. They took the spot left by Felda United.
^4No teams from Premier League were relegated due to the FAM decision to keep the league teams at 10 following Felda and UKM expulsion.
^5UKM FC registration was not approved by FAM as they failed to provide concrete proof of financial backing for the new season.

== Stadium and locations ==
Locations of teams in the 2021 Malaysia Premier League teams

Note: Table lists in alphabetical order.

Team	Location	Stadium	Capacity
FAM-MSN Project	Shah Alam	UiTM Stadium	10,000
Johor Darul Ta'zim II	Larkin	Tan Sri Dato Haji Hassan Yunos Stadium	30,000
Kelantan	Kota Bharu	Sultan Muhammad IV Stadium	22,000
Kelantan United	Kota Bharu	Sultan Muhammad IV Stadium	22,000
Kuching City	Kota Kinabalu	Likas Stadium	35,000
Negeri Sembilan	Seremban	Tuanku Abdul Rahman Stadium	45,000
PDRM	Kuala Lumpur	Kuala Lumpur Stadium	18,000
Perak II	Ipoh	Perak Stadium	27,036
Sarawak United	Krubong	Hang Jebat Stadium	40,000
Selangor II	Selayang	Selayang Stadium	16,000
Terengganu II	Kuala Terengganu	Sultan Ismail Nasiruddin Shah Stadium	15,000

== Personnel and sponsoring ==
Note: Flags indicate national team as has been defined under FIFA eligibility rules. Players may hold more than one non-FIFA nationality.

Team	Head coach	Captain	Kit manufacturer	Shirt sponsor(s)
FAM-MSN Project	(Malaysia) Yusri Che Lah	(Malaysia) Amirul Akmal Safarinizam	Kelme	
Johor Darul Ta'zim II	(Spain) Rafa Gil	(Malaysia) Fadhli Shas	Nike	UNICEF
Kelantan	(Italy) Marco Ragini	(Malaysia) Che Safwan Hazman	93 Sports	Zamburger
Kelantan United	(Japan) Akira Higashiyama	(Malaysia) Badhri Radzi	Umbro	Yakult
Kuching City	(Malaysia) Irfan Bakti	(Malaysia) Joseph Kalang Tie	StarSport	Serba Dinamik
Negeri Sembilan	(Malaysia) K. Devan	(Malaysia) Zaquan Adha	Kaki Jersi	Visit Negeri Sembilan, Matrix
PDRM	(Malaysia) Wan Rohaimi Wan Ismail	(Malaysia) Safiee Ahmad	Oren Sport	Top Glove
Perak II	(Malaysia) Syamsul Saad	(Malaysia) Izaaq Izhan Yuswardi	Kaki Jersi	Lenggong Valley (home) & Royal Belum (away)
Sarawak United	(Malaysia) E. Elavarasan	(Australia) Taylor Regan	Joma	Punggor Wibawa
Selangor II	(Germany) Michael Feichtenbeiner	(Malaysia) Shivan Pillay	Joma	PKNS
Terengganu II	(Malaysia) Badrul Afzan	(Montenegro) Argzim Redžović	Al-Ikhsan	redONE

=== Coaching changes ===
Note: Flags indicate national team as has been defined under FIFA eligibility rules. Players may hold more than one non-FIFA nationality.

Team	Outgoing coach	Manner of departure	Date of vacancy	Position in table	Incoming coach	Date of appointment
Kuching City	(Japan) Akira Higashiyama	End of Contract	30 November 2020	Pre-season	(Malaysia) Irfan Bakti Abu Salim	1 December 2020
Negeri Sembilan	(Malaysia) Sazali Saidon	End of Contract	30 November 2020	Pre-season	(Malaysia) K. Devan	1 December 2020
Selangor II	(Malaysia) Rusdi Suparman	End of Caretaker Spell	30 November 2020	Pre-season	(Germany) Michael Feichtenbeiner	1 December 2020
Kelantan United	(Malaysia) Nazrulerwan Makmor	Redesignated to Technical Director	30 November 2020	Pre-season	(Japan) Akira Higashiyama	5 December 2020
FAM-MSN Project	Inaugural head coach			Pre-season	(Malaysia) Yusri Che Lah	10 December 2020
PDRM	(Malaysia) Ishak Kunju	End of Contract	30 November 2020	Pre-season	(Malaysia) Mat Zan Mat Aris	24 December 2020
Terengganu II	(Malaysia) Roshadi Wahab	End of Contract	30 November 2020	Pre-season	(Malaysia) Badrul Afzan Razali	24 December 2020
Perak II	(Malaysia) Abu Bakar Fadzim	End of Contract	30 November 2020	Pre-season	(Malaysia) Syamsul Saad	2 January 2021
Kelantan	(Malaysia) Yusri Che Lah	End of Contract	30 November 2020	Pre-season	(Italy) Marco Ragini	15 January 2021
PDRM	(Malaysia) Mat Zan Mat Aris	Sacked	31 March 2021	Mid Season	(Malaysia) Wan Rohaimi Wan Ismail	31 March 2021

== Foreign players ==
Players name in bold indicates the player was registered after the start of the season.

The number of foreign players is restricted to four each team including at least one player from the AFC country.

Note: Flags indicate national team as has been defined under FIFA eligibility rules. Players may hold more than one non-FIFA nationality.

Club	Player 1	Player 2	Player 3	AFC Player	Former Player
Johor Darul Ta'zim II	(Argentina) Luis Cabrerra	(Japan) Kei Hirose	(Spain) Fernando Rodríguez	(Australia) **Shane Lowry**	(Argentina) Nicolás Fernández
Kelantan	(Greece) Christos Intzidis	(Spain) Mario Arqués	(England) Jack Hindle	(Indonesia) Natanael Siringo Ringo	
Kelantan United	(Japan) Shuhei Fukai	(Japan) Masashi Motoyama	(The Gambia) Gassama Alfusainey	(Japan) Yuki Tanigawa	
Kuching City	(Brazil) Aylton Alemão	(Brazil) Hudson Dias	(Nigeria) **Ijezie Michael**	(Japan) Yuta Suzuki	(Brazil) Bryan Jones
Negeri Sembilan	(Brazil) **Arthur Cunha**	(Togo) **Francis Koné**	(Cameroon) Alain Akono	(South Korea) Bae Beom-geun	(Brazil) Diogo Campos (Brazil) Fernando Barbosa (Brazil) Rafael Gomes de Oliveira
PDRM	(Argentina) **Alvaro Cuello**	(Ghana) Alexander Amponsah	(Namibia) Lazarus Kaimbi	(Japan) Bruno Suzuki	(Zimbabwe) Victor Kamhuka
Perak II	(France) **Ghislain Guessan**	(England) **Charlie Machell**		(Lebanon) (Bulgaria) **Samir Ayass**	
Sarawak United	(Brazil) Sandro	(Nigeria) Uche Agba	(Australia) Taylor Regan	(South Korea) Lee Chang-hoon	
Selangor II	(Ghana) Jordan Ayimbila	(Ghana) George Attram	(Ghana) **Alex Agyarkwa**	(Myanmar) Hein Htet Aung	
Terengganu II	(Montenegro) Argzim Redžović	(Ivory Coast) Dechi Marcel N'Guessan	(Ghana) Jordan Mintah	(Japan) Masaki Watanabe	

=== Naturalisation players ===
Club	Player 1	Player 2	Player 3
Johor Darul Ta'zim II	(England) (Malaysia) **Stuart Wilkin**	(China) (Malaysia) **Nathaniel Shio Hong Wan**	
Sarawak United	(Scotland) (Malaysia) **Stuart Wark**	(New Zealand) (Malaysia) **Khair Jones**	

== League table ==
Pos	Team	Pld	W	D	L	GF	GA	GD	Pts	Qualification or relegation
1	Negeri Sembilan (C, P)	20	12	5	3	33	16	+17	41	Promotion to Super League and Qualification for the Malaysia Cup group stage
2	Sarawak United (P)	20	11	5	4	37	14	+23	38	Promotion to Super League and Qualification for the Malaysia Cup group stage
3	Terengganu II (Note: Johor Darul Ta'zim II, Perak II, Selangor II and Terengganu II cannot be promoted from Malaysia Premier League and play in Malaysia Cup as Johor Darul Ta'zim F.C., Perak FA, Selangor F.C. and Terengganu FC (their parent clubs) remain in Malaysia Super League and play in Malaysia Cup. Should the team be relegated to Malaysia Premier League or will not play in Malaysia Cup, Johor Darul Ta'zim II, Perak II, Selangor II and Terengganu II will have to drop to Malaysia M3 League or will play in Malaysia Cup.)	20	9	8	3	37	18	+19	35	
4	Johor Darul Ta'zim II	20	9	7	4	38	20	+18	34	
5	Kuching City	20	7	6	7	22	22	0	27	Qualification for the Malaysia Cup group stage
6	Kelantan	20	8	3	9	23	28	−5	27	Qualification for the Malaysia Cup group stage
7	Kelantan United	20	8	2	10	25	28	−3	26	Qualification for the Malaysia Cup group stage
8	PDRM	20	7	5	8	22	25	−3	26	
9	Selangor II	20	5	9	6	27	26	+1	24	
10	Perak II (R)	20	4	5	11	14	37	−23	17	
11	FAM-MSN Project (Note: FAM-MSN Project is only as a back-up squad and will not promote to Super League.)	20	1	3	16	12	56	−44	6	

Source: MFL
Rules for classification: 1) Points; 2) Goal difference; 3) Number of goals scored.
(C) Champions; (P) Promoted; (R) Relegated

== Positions by round ==
The table lists the positions of teams after each week of matches.
In order to preserve chronological evolvements, any postponed matches are not included to the round at which they were originally scheduled, but added to the full round they were played immediately afterwards.

Team ╲ Round	1	2	3	4	5	6	7	8	9	10	11	12	13	14	15	16	17	18	19	20
Negeri Sembilan	4	2	1	1	1	1	1	3	1	1	1	2	1	1	1	2	2	2	1	1
Sarawak United	3	1	2	2	2	2	3	1	2	2	2	1	3	3	3	1	1	1	2	2
Selangor II	2	4	3	5	3	4	5	5	7	7	5	5	5	4	5	6	6	6	6	9
Terengganu II	1	3	6	6	4	5	6	7	6	6	3	3	2	2	2	3	3	4	3	3
Johor Darul Ta'zim II	7	9	7	7	5	3	2	2	3	4	6	6	6	5	4	4	4	3	4	4
Kelantan	8	5	4	3	6	6	4	4	5	5	6	4	5	7	8	7	6	7	8	6
Kelantan United	9	6	5	4	7	7	7	6	4	3	4	7	7	6	7	9	8	9	9	7
Kuching City	6	8	9	10	8	9	9	9	10	10	8	9	9	9	10	8	9	8	7	5
PDRM	10	11	10	8	9	10	10	10	8	9	10	8	8	8	5	5	5	5	5	8
Perak II	5	7	8	9	10	8	8	8	9	8	9	10	10	10	9	10	10	10	10	10
FAM-MSN Project	11	10	11	11	11	11	11	11	11	11	11	11	11	11	11	11	11	11	11	11

Leader

Source: MFL

== Results ==
Home \ Away	FMP	JDT	KEL	KLU	KUC	NSE	PDRM	PRK	SUD	SEL	TFCII
FAM-MSN Project		0–5	1–2	0–3	2–2	1–3	1–3	0–2	0–4	0–1	1–6
Johor Darul Ta'zim II	5–1		1–1	3–0	3–1	0–0	1–0	3–2	1–1	0–0	3–2
Kelantan	2–1	0–3		3–1	1–0	2–1	1–2	0–1	0–1	2–1	0–2
Kelantan United	0–1	0–0	0–2		1–0	0–2	2–0	2–1	2–3	2–2	1–0
Kuching City	2–0	2–1	3–1	1–3		1–2	0–0	2–0	1–0	1–1	0–2
Negeri Sembilan	2–0	2–1	2–1	2–3	0–0		4–2	5–0	1–1	0–0	2–2
PDRM	0–0	2–2	1–2	1–0	1–2	0–1		1–1	0–3	0–3	2–1
Perak II	0–0	0–2	1–1	0–4	0–2	0–2	0–3		0–3	4–3	0–0
Sarawak United	7–1	1–0	3–1	2–0	2–0	0–1	0–2	4–1		1–1	0–0
Selangor II	4–2	1–1	3–1	1–0	1–1	1–2	0–1	0–1	1–1		1–4
Terengganu II	4–0	4–3	0–0	4–1	1–1	1–0	1–1	0–0	1–0	2–2	

Legend: Blue = home team win; Yellow = draw; Red = away team win.
For upcoming matches, an "a" indicates there is an article about the rivalry between the two participants.

== Season statistics ==
=== Top goalscorers ===
As of 24 September 2021

Rank	Player	Club	Goals
1	(Ghana) Jordan Mintah	Terengganu II	16
1	(Spain) Fernando Rodríguez	Johor Darul Ta'zim II	16
3	(Nigeria) Uche Agba	Sarawak United	14
4	(The Gambia) Gassama Alfusainey	Kelantan United	11
6	(Cameroon) Alain Akono	Negeri Sembilan	9
6	(Ghana) George Attram	Selangor II	9
6	(Malaysia) Nurshamil Abd Ghani	Kelantan	9
8	(Malaysia) Azhad Harraz	FAM-MSN Project	8
9	(Japan) Bruno Suzuki	PDRM	7
9	(Malaysia) Zaquan Adha	Negeri Sembilan	7
11	(Malaysia) Alif Hassan	Kuching City	5
11	(Togo) Francis Koné	Negeri Sembilan	5

=== Hat-tricks ===
Player	For	Against	Result	Date
(Ghana) George Attram	Selangor II	FAM-MSN Project	4–2 (H)	12 March 2021
(Nigeria) Uche Agba	Sarawak United	FAM-MSN Project	7–1 (H)	10 April 2021
(Ghana) Jordan Mintah	Terengganu II	Kelantan United	4–1 (H)	2 May 2021
(Ghana) Jordan Mintah	Terengganu II	FAM-MSN Project	6–1 (A)	7 May 2021

=== Clean sheets ===
As of matches played 12 September 2021

Rank	Player	Club	Clean sheets
1	(Malaysia) Sharbinee Allawee	Sarawak United	8

== See also ==
- 2021 Malaysia Super League
- 2021 Malaysia M3 League
- 2021 Malaysia M4 League
- 2021 Malaysia FA Cup
- 2021 Malaysia Cup
- 2021 Malaysia Challenge Cup
- 2021 Piala Presiden
- 2021 Piala Belia
