= Johor Darul Ta'zim II F.C. =

Association football team in Malaysia

Johor Darul Ta'zim II
- Full name: Johor Darul Ta'zim Football Club II
- Nickname: Southern Tigers
- Short name: JDTII
- Founded: 1955; 71 years ago, as Johor FA; 2014; 12 years ago, as JDT II
- Ground: Tan Sri Dato' Haji Hassan Yunos Stadium Pasir Gudang Municipality Stadium
- Capacity: 30,000; 15,000
- Owner: Tunku Ismail Sultan Ibrahim
- Head coach: Josep Ferré
- League: Malaysia A1 Semi-Pro League
- 2025–26: 1st, Winner
- Website: http://johorsoutherntigers.com.my/
Home colours	Away colours	Third colours

Johor Darul Ta'zim Football Club II (/dʒəˈhɔːr/; Malay: Kelab Bolasepak Johor Darul Ta'zim II) or simply JDT II is a feeder club for Johor Darul Ta'zim. The club plays in Malaysia A1 Semi-Pro League from 2025–26, the second tier of the Malaysian football league system.

== History ==
=== Origins as Johor FA (1955–2013) ===
Before becoming a reserve squad, the team was the primary state representative side for Johor in Malaysian football.

- The Jengking Era. Known historically by the nickname Jengking (Scorpions), Johor FA enjoyed its golden age in the late 1980s and 1990s. The team won the prestigious Malaysia Cup twice (1985 and 1991), claimed the top-flight league title in 1991, and lifted the Malaysia FA Cup in 1998.
- Administrative Shifts. Between 2006 and 2008, the team briefly competed as Johor PBT Pasir Gudang following a merger with Pasir Gudang United. It reverted to Johor FA in 2009 and struggled in the lower tiers until Crown Prince Tunku Ismail Sultan Ibrahim took over and overhauled Johor football.

=== Restructuring into JDT II (2014–2019) ===
Ahead of the 2014 season, Tunku Ismail unified football teams across the state under one umbrella. While the corporate-backed Johor FC became the flagship Super League team (JDT), the historic Johor FA state team was rebranded as Johor Darul Ta'zim II F.C.

Feeder Club Role. Assigned to the second-tier Malaysia Premier League, JDT II was tasked with developing Under-23 prospects and providing match fitness for senior squad players. Because of feeder club rules, JDT II was ineligible for promotion to the Malaysia Super League.

Early Silverware. JDT II consistently finished in the top five of the Malaysia Premier League during its first five seasons. In 2019, the club finished as league runners-up and won its first major trophy under the new identity by capturing the Malaysia Challenge Cup.

== Club's names ==
- 1955–2006: Johor Football Association
- 2006–2008: Johor Pihak Berkuasa Tempatan Pasir Gudang (merge with Pasir Gudang United)
- 2009–2013: Johor Football Association
- 2014–present: Johor Darul Ta'zim II Football Club (reserve team)

== Stadium ==
=== Pasir Gudang Corporation Stadium ===
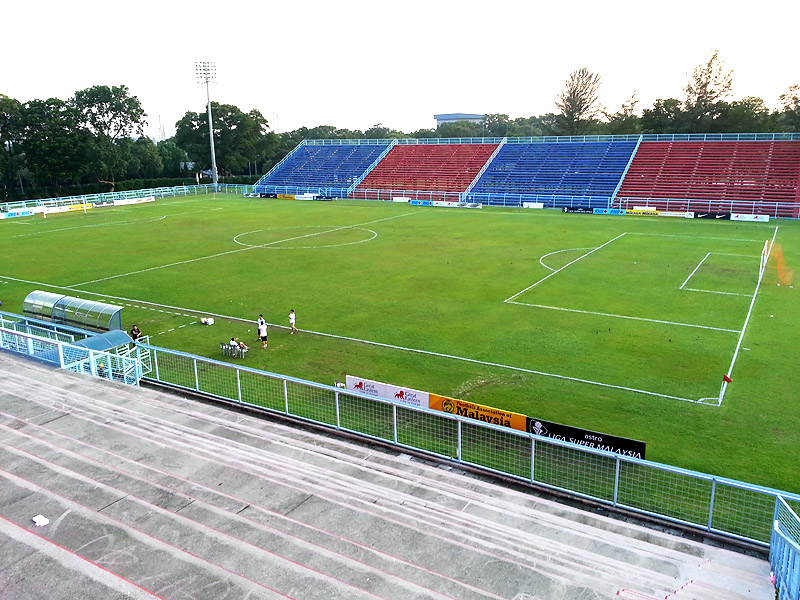
Pasir Gudang Corporation Stadium

Prior to 2020, Johor Darul Ta'zim II FC played their home games at Pasir Gudang Corporation Stadium (Malay: Stadium Perbadanan Pasir Gudang).

=== Tan Sri Dato' Haji Hassan Yunos Stadium ===
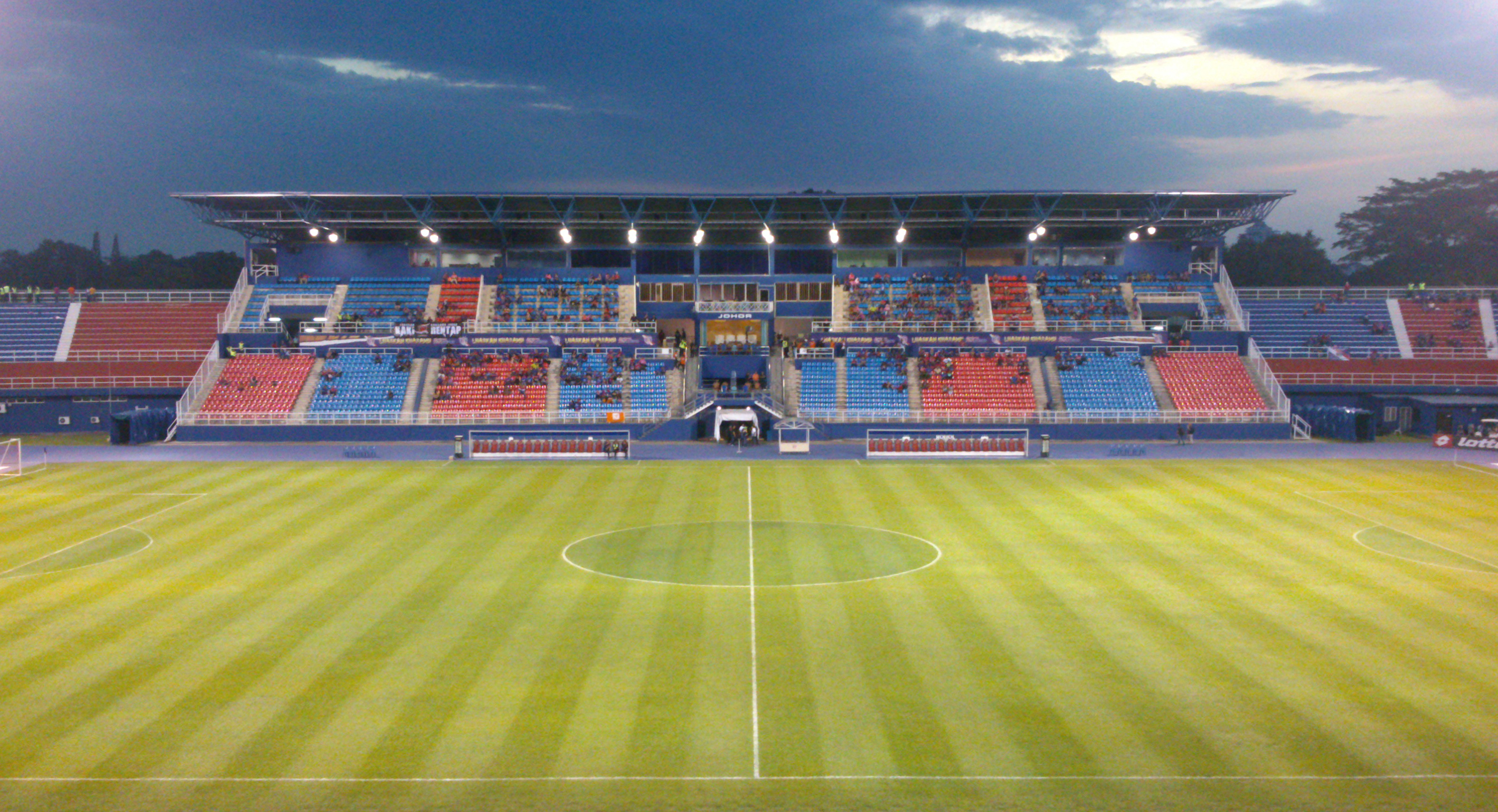
Tan Sri Dato' Haji Hassan Yunos Stadium

In 2020, JDT II relocated its home matches from the Pasir Gudang Corporation Stadium to the historic 30,000-capacity Tan Sri Dato' Haji Hassan Yunos Stadium (Larkin Stadium) after the senior JDT side moved into the new Sultan Ibrahim Stadium.

Coordinates	Location	Stadium	Capacity	Year
1°27′43″N 103°53′53″E	Pasir Gudang	Pasir Gudang Corporation Stadium	15,000	2013–2019
	Larkin	Tan Sri Dato' Haji Hassan Yunos Stadium	30,000	2020–present

== Players ==
=== Current squad ===
As of August 2026

Note: Flags indicate national team as defined under FIFA eligibility rules; some limited exceptions apply. Players may hold more than one non-FIFA nationality.

No.	Pos.	Nation	Player
1	GK	MAS	Faez Iqhwan Azmi^{U22}
2	DF	BRA	Dani Bolt
3	DF	MAS	Dinesh Vikneswaran
5	DF	MAS	Junior Eldstål
6	MF	MAS	Danish Hakimi Sahaludin^{U22}
7	MF	MAS	Najmuddin Akmal
8	MF	MAS	Danish Irham
9	FW	ESP	Celso José Bermejo
10	MF	MAS	Danish Syamer^{U22}
12	MF	MAS	Ziad El Basheer
13	DF	MAS	Aysar Hadi (captain)
14	DF	MAS	Adam Daniel^{U22}
15	MF	MAS	Mohamadou Sumareh
16	MF	MAS	Irfan Shahkimi^{U22}
17	DF	MAS	Ariff Safwan^{U22}
18	MF	MAS	Daryl Sham

No.	Pos.	Nation	Player
20	MF	MAS	Danish Mohamad
21	DF	MAS	Irfan Zakwan^{U22}
22	GK	MAS	Zulhilmi Sharani^{U22}
23	FW	MAS	Naim Zainudin^{U22}
24	GK	MAS	Danial Idraqi^{U22}
25	GK	MAS	Ierfan Hafizan^{U22}
27	DF	MAS	Fakrul Haikal Razali
28	DF	MAS	Adam Farhan^{U22}
29	MF	MAS	Syukur Fariz
30	MF	ESP	Jon Landa
31	DF	MAS	Faris Danish^{U22}
32	DF	MAS	Muhammad Alif Ahmad
37	DF	MAS	Shafizan Arshad^{U22}
60	MF	MAS	Hong Wan

== Club records ==
Year	Position	League	FA Cup	Malaysia Cup/Malaysia Challenge Cup	Top scorer
2014	5th of 12	Malaysia Premier League	Round of 32	Group Stage	(Spain) Braulio Nobrega (9 goals)
2015	5th of 12	Malaysia Premier League	Quarter-finals	Group Stage	(Singapore) Shahril Ishak (9 goals)
2016	Third place	Malaysia Premier League	Round of 32	Group Stage	(Brazil) Paulo Rangel (23 goals)
2017	4th of 12	Malaysia Premier League	Round of 32	Not participated	(Argentina) Nicolás Fernández (12 goals)
2018	4th of 12	Malaysia Premier League	Not participated	Semi-finals	(Malaysia) Darren Lok (8 goals)
2019	Runner-up	Malaysia Premier League	DNQ	Champions	(Lebanon) Mohamad Ghaddar (10 goals)
2020	5th of 12	Malaysia Premier League	Cancelled	Cancelled	(Spain) Fernando Rodriguez (7 goals)
2021	4th of 11	Malaysia Premier League	Cancelled	Cancelled	(Spain) Fernando Rodriguez (16 goals)
2022	Champions	Malaysia Premier League	Not participated	Cancelled	(Spain) Fernando Rodriguez (8 goals) (Malaysia) Daryl Sham (8 goals)
2023	Runner-up	MFL Cup	Not participated	Not participated	(Malaysia) Gabriel Nistelrooy (13 goals)
2024–25	Champions	MFL Cup	Not participated	Not participated	(Malaysia) Gabriel Nistelrooy (24 goals)
2025–26	Champions	Malaysia A1 Semi-Pro League	Not participated	Not participated	(Spain) Celso Bermejo (18 goals)

== Honours ==
=== League ===
- Division 1/Malaysia Super League

- Winners (1): 1991
- Runners-up (1): 1985

- Division 2/Malaysia Premier League

- Winners (2): 1999, 2022
- Runners-up (1): 2019

- Division 2/Malaysia A1 Semi-Pro League

- Winners (1): 2025–26

- Division 3/Malaysia FAM League
  - Runners-up (3): 1959, 1966, 1973

=== Cups ===
- Malaysia Cup

- Winners (2): 1985, 1991
- Runners-up (1): 1986

- Malaysia FA Cup

- Winners (1): 1998

- Malaysia Challenge Cup

- Winners (1): 2019

- Malaysia Charity Shield

- Winners (1): 1986
- Runners-up (2): 1992, 1999

- MFL Cup

- Winners (1): 2024–25
- Runners-up (1): 2023

- Crown Prince of Johor Cup

- Winners (1): 2012

=== International ===
- Sultan Hassanal Bolkiah Cup

- Winners: 1987

== Coaching staff ==
Position	Staff
Manager	(Malaysia) Mustaffa Kamal Shamsudin
Head coach	(Spain) Ferre Ybarz Josep Maria
Assistant coach	(Argentina) Gonzalo Sanz Zaballos
Assistant coach	(Malaysia) Mahadzir Ahmad
Assistant coach	(Malaysia) Amirul Hadi Zainal
Assistant coach	(Malaysia) Ramlan Rashid
Fitness coach	(Spain) Sanchez Ferre Pau
Goalkeeping coach	(Argentina) Ribera Sanz Gabriel
Physiotherapist	(Malaysia) Ahmad Syafiq Hakimi
Physiotherapist	(Argentina) Ruiz Pastor Pablo
Team Doctor	(Malaysia) Shafiq Halim
Team Media	(Malaysia) Zaki Akmal Abdul Latiff
Team Analyst	(Spain) Pol Corpas Cuatrecasa
Nutritionist	(Malaysia) Nurul Syafiqa Zulkifli
Kitman	(Malaysia) Nuraimi Rahim
Kitman	(Malaysia) Ahmad Norhapiza Basri

== Coaching history ==
Head coaches by years (since 2014)

Years	Name	Nationality
28 February 2014	Azmi Mohamed	Malaysia
1 March 2014 – 8 April 2014	Rajko Magić	Croatia
5 November 2014 – 10 May 2015	Goran Paulić	Croatia
11 May 2015 – 30 November 2015	Nenad Baćina	Croatia
1 January 2016 – 17 January 2017	Benjamin Mora	Mexico
18 January 2017 – 19 June 2017	Hamzani Omar	Malaysia
20 June 2017 – 9 August 2018	Benjamin Mora	Mexico
9 August 2018 – 23 October 2019	Ervin Boban	Croatia
6 November 2019 – 2020	Rafa Gil	Spain
