= Raúl Longhi =

Argentine footballer

Personal information
- Full name: Raúl Marcos Longhi Aizpún
- Date of birth: 17 May 1952 (age 74)
- Place of birth: Mar del Plata, Argentina
- Position: Winger

Youth career
- Kimberley

Senior career*
Years	Team	Apps	(Gls)
1969–1973	Kimberley		
1973–1982	Espanyol	70	(7)
1973–1976	→ San Andrés (loan)	30	(4)
1982–1983	Girona		
1983–1985	Hospitalet	44	(2)

Managerial career
- 1986–1987: Hospitalet
- 1987–1988: Sant Cugat
- 1988–1989: Espanyol (interim)
- 1989–1991: Sant Cugat
- 1993: Gimnàstic
- 1993–1995: Figueres
- 1998–2000: Cultural Leonesa
- 2011–2013: Espanyol B
- 2012: Espanyol (interim)
- 2013–2014: Derthona
- 2018: Johor Darul Ta'zim (interim)
- * Club domestic league appearances and goals

Raúl Marcos Longhi Aizpún (born 17 May 1952) is an Argentine retired footballer who played mainly as a right winger.

== Playing career ==
Born in Mar del Plata, Longhi started his senior career with hometown club CA Kimberley, making his debuts in Argentine Primera División at the age of only 18. In 1973, he moved abroad, joining RCD Espanyol but being immediately loaned to CD San Andrés in Segunda División.

Longhi appeared for Sant Andreu during three full seasons, and returned to the Pericos in the 1976 summer. He made his La Liga debut on 15 May 1977, coming on as a second-half substitute in a 3–0 home win against Hércules CF; it was his only appearance of the campaign.

Longhi scored his first goal in the main category of Spanish football on 26 March 1978, netting the first in a 2–0 success over Real Betis also at the Estadi de Sarrià. He was released by the club in 1982, and subsequently represented Tercera División sides Girona FC and CE L'Hospitalet before retiring in 1985.

== Manager career ==
Shortly after retiring, Longhi was appointed manager of his last club Hospitalet. After a one-year stint at FC Sant Cugat Esport, he returned to Espanyol; initially an assistant, he was an interim manager of the club during its 1–0 away win against Real Oviedo on 16 April 1989.

Longhi subsequently returned to Sant Cugat, and in May 1991, was named Gimnàstic de Tarragona manager. In March 1994 he was appointed at the helm of UE Figueres, and left the club in May 1995.

In the 1997 summer Longhi joined Víctor Muñoz's staff at CD Logroñés. The duo split in 1999, after Longhi was appointed manager at Cultural y Deportiva Leonesa, but reunited in the following year, being in charge of Villarreal CF, Real Zaragoza, Panathinaikos F.C., Recreativo de Huelva and Getafe CF.

On 3 June 2011 Longhi was appointed RCD Espanyol B manager. On 28 November of the following year, as the previous manager Mauricio Pochettino was sacked, he was in charge of the main squad during a 0–3 Copa del Rey loss against Sevilla FC.

On 30 January 2013 Longhi was dismissed. On 19 November he moved abroad, being named Derthona F.B.C. 1908 manager.

In March 2014 Longhi returned to Zaragoza, again as Muñoz's assistant. In the following year, he was the assistant of compatriot Mario Gómez at Malaysian club Johor Darul Ta'zim F.C. From 22 February 2018, Longhi also holds the position as caretaker head coach for Johor Darul Ta'zim after the resignation of Ulisses Morais.

He has denied any rift between him and Safiq Rahim, after the midfielder looked to have been reduced to a fringe player due to limited game time, as reported by FOX Sports Asia in an article.

Under Longhi, Johor Darul Ta'zim won the 2018 Malaysia Super League title, their fifth-in-a-row league championship. In August 2018, Longhi was released along with his two assistants in a management restructure, after his team fell to a 2–1 defeat to Malaysia Premier League side MISC-MIFA at home in the first match of the 2018 Malaysia Cup.
