= Lim Teong Kim =

Malaysian footballer and coach

Datuk Lim Teong Kim PMW
Personal information
- Full name: Lim Teong Kim
- Date of birth: 26 August 1963 (age 63)
- Place of birth: Malacca, Malaysia
- Position: Midfielder

Team information
- Current team: Perak

Senior career*
| Years | Team | Apps | (Gls) |
| 1983 | Malacca | 4 | (0) |
| 1984–1986 | Kuala Lumpur | 17 | (2) |
| 1987 | Hertha BSC | 9 | (2) |
| 1987–1991 | Kuala Lumpur | 54 | (10) |
| 1992 | Negeri Sembilan | 7 | (0) |
| 1993–1994 | Kedah | 7 | (3) |
| 1994–1997 | SD Ibiza | 70 | (16) |
| Total | | 168 | (33) |

International career
| 1982–1996 | Malaysia | 60 | (12) |

Managerial career
- 2001–2013: Bayern Munich U19
- 2013–2019: Malaysia U-17
- 2022–2023: Perak F.C.
Chinese name
| Traditional Chinese | 林長金 |
| Simplified Chinese | 林长金 |
| Hanyu Pinyin | Lín Zhǎngjīn |
| Hokkien POJ | Lîm Tiôngkim |
- * Club domestic league appearances and goals

Datuk Lim Teong Kim (Chinese: 林长金; born 26 August 1963) is a Malaysian professional football coach and former player, who is recently appointed as head coach of Malaysian club Perak FC starting from 2023 season. He was formerly an assistant coach of Bayern Munich U19.

On 17 February 2022, IFFHS selected him on their list of Men's All Time Malaysia Dream Team.

Lim is the only Malaysian to have played in the German Bundesliga, having spent a season at Hertha BSC in 1987.

== Club career ==
=== Malacca ===
The former midfielder, renowned for his ruthless streak, began his career with Malacca in 1983 before moving to Kuala Lumpur from 1984 to 1986.

=== Hertha BSC ===
He became the first Malaysian footballer to play in Europe when he signed for German club Hertha BSC in 1987. He only played for a single season in Germany before returning to Malaysia.

=== Kuala Lumpur ===
After returning from Germany, Lim signed and played for Kuala Lumpur, winning Malaysia Cup winner's medals for a record three consecutive times from 1987 to 1989.

=== Negeri Sembilan ===
Lim joined Negeri Sembilan in 1992, supporting the club during their debut season as newcomers in 1992 Liga Semi-Pro Divisyen 1. That same year, he also represented the Negeri Sembilan Malays Football Association in the 1992 Piala Emas Raja-Raja, where he secured his first title with the state side.

==== Trials at Grazer AK ====
Apart from the stay in Berlin, Lim had a short trial with Austrian outfit, Grazer AK in 1990. His final outing as a player was for Kedah FA in 1993–1994.

== International career ==
With the Malaysia national team, he won the 1989 Southeast Asian Games gold medal. He scored the second goal in the 3–1 win over Singapore in the final. In total, Lim earned 60 international caps and scored 12 international goals for Malaysia.

== Coaching career ==
=== Bayern Munich U-19 ===
Lim's coaching stint with Bayern Munich Junior Team was from 2001 until 2011.

=== Malaysia U-17 ===
He returned to Malaysia in August 2013 and signed a five-year contract with the Sports Ministry as the Project Director of National Football Development Programme (NFDP). Later in 2016, he was appointed as the Director of Mokhtar Dahari Academy (AMD), in a contract that was supposed to last until 2020. Syed Saddiq, the Minister of Youth and Sports Malaysia revealed that Lim was receiving a RM175,000 monthly salary package with tax exemption as the director of AMD. In September 2018, following the failure of the Malaysian B-16 squad to advance to the U-17 World Cup in Peru 2019, FAM held Lim responsible and terminated his service as coach with immediate effect.

=== Perak ===
On 13 September 2022, Lim was appointed the head coach of Perak, which was in Malaysia's second division, the Malaysian Premier League, at that time. In his first club coaching in Malaysia, Lim steered the club to promotion to Malaysia Super League in his first season. On 25 May 2023, Lim's contract was terminated by Perak and were replaced by the team's under-23 coach, Yusri Che Lah. At the time of Lim's sacking, Perak were 11th in the Super League with only two wins, three draws and seven defeats from 12 games. However Lim challenged his dismissal from Perak, with his case being brought to court after failure on negotiations between Lim and Perak's management.

== Personal life ==
Lim's nephew, Lim Tong Hai is a former Singaporean legend who played for Singapore FA, Tanjong Pagar United and Geylang International.

== Honours ==
=== Club ===
Malacca

- Malaysian League: 1983

Kuala Lumpur

- Malaysian League: 1988
- Malaysia Cup: 1987, 1988, 1989
- Malaysia Charity Shield: 1988

Negeri Sembilan Malays Football Association

- Piala Emas Raja-Raja: 1992

Kedah

- Malaysian League: 1993
- Malaysia Cup: 1993
- Malaysia Charity Shield: 1994

=== International ===
- SEA Games: 1989

=== Awards ===
- Federal Territory (Malaysia)
  - Commander of the Order of the Territorial Crown (PMW) – Datuk (2023)
