= 2018 Malaysia Super League =

Liga Super Malaysia
- Season: 2018
- Dates: 3 February – 29 July 2018
- Champions: Johor Darul Ta'zim; 5th Super League title 5th Liga M title
- Relegated: Kelantan; Negeri Sembilan
- AFC Champions League: Johor Darul Ta'zim; Perak
- Matches: 132
- Goals: 402 (3.05 per match)
- Top goalscorer: Rufino Segovia (19 goals)
- Biggest home win: Pahang 4–0 Negeri Sembilan (10 March 2018); Kedah 4–0 Selangor (13 April 2018); Kuala Lumpur 5–1 Kelantan (22 May 2018); Pahang 4–0 Kuala Lumpur (25 May 2018); Selangor 4–0 Kelantan (1 June 2018); PKNS 4–0 Terengganu (14 July 2018); Johor Darul Ta'zim 4–0 Kelantan (20 July 2018); PKNS 4–1 Perak (28 July 2018)
- Biggest away win: Negeri Sembilan 0–4 Johor Darul Ta'zim (5 May 2018); Melaka United 0–4 Johor Darul Ta'zim (26 June 2018); Kuala Lumpur 1–5 Perak (18 July 2018)
- Highest scoring: 8 goals PKNS 5–3 Negeri Sembilan (11 July 2018)
- Longest winning run: 10 games Johor Darul Ta'zim
- Longest unbeaten run: 19 games Johor Darul Ta'zim
- Longest winless run: 7 games Melaka United
- Longest losing run: 4 games Selangor; Kelantan
- All statistics correct as of 29 July 2018.

The 2018 Malaysia Super League (Malay: Liga Super Malaysia 2018), known as 2018 unifi Malaysia Super League (Malay: unifi Liga Super Malaysia 2018) for sponsorship reasons, was the 15th season of the Malaysia Super League, the top-tier professional football league in Malaysia.

Johor Darul Ta'zim were the defending champions.

== Club licensing regulations ==
Starting this season, every team in the Liga Super Malaysia must have a FAM Club Licence to play in the league, or else they are relegated. To obtain a FAM Club Licence, teams must be financially healthy and meet certain standards of conduct as organisations. As part of privation effort for the league, all clubs compete in Liga Super Malaysia and Liga Premier Malaysia will be required to obtained FAM Club Licence.

As in other national leagues, there are significant benefits to being in the top division:

- A greater share of television broadcast licence revenues goes to Liga Super Malaysia sides.
- Greater exposure through television and higher attendance levels helps Liga Super Malaysia teams attract the most lucrative sponsorships.
- Liga Super Malaysia teams develop substantial financial muscle through the combination of television and gate revenues, sponsorships and marketing of their team brands. This allows them to attract and retain skilled players from domestic and international sources and to construct first-class stadium facilities.

Despite several reminders from FAM from the beginning of 2015, however there are few teams failed to get the approval for both AFC and FAM club licenses from First Instance Body (FIB) .

Team(s)	AFC Club License Status	FAM Club License Status
Johor Darul Ta'zim	Passed	Passed
Kedah	Failed	Passed
Kelantan	Failed	Passed
Kuala Lumpur	Failed	Passed
Melaka United	Failed	Passed
Negeri Sembilan	Passed	Passed
Pahang	Passed	Passed
Perak	Failed	Passed
PKNP	Failed	Passed
PKNS	Passed	Passed
Selangor	Passed	Passed
Terengganu	Failed	Passed

*Updated: 6 December 2017

== Team changes ==
The following teams have changed division.

=== To Malaysia Super League ===
Promoted from Premier League

- Kuala Lumpur
- Terengganu
- PKNP
- Negeri Sembilan

=== From Malaysia Super League ===
Relegated to Premier League

- Felda United
- T–Team
- Sarawak
- Penang

== Teams ==
Sarawak and Penang were relegated to 2018 Malaysia Premier League after finished 11th and bottom place of last season league. Kuala Lumpur and Terengganu promoted to 2018 Malaysia Super League after securing place as champions and runners-up in 2017 Malaysia Premier League.

On 21 November 2017, it was announced that T-Team who finished ninth in the Super League last year, will play in the 2018 Malaysia Premier League pending approval from Football Malaysia LLP (FMLLP). The suggestion then were approved on 4 December 2017, followed by an announcement stating that Felda United, who finished third last season are ineligible to compete in this year top-tier competition. They were replaced by Negeri Sembilan and PKNP.

Locations of teams in the 2018 Malaysia Super League.

=== Venues ===
Team	Location	Stadium	Capacity
Johor Darul Ta'zim	Johor Bahru	Tan Sri Dato' Haji Hassan Yunos Stadium	30,000
Kedah	Alor Setar	Darul Aman Stadium	32,387
Kelantan	Kota Bharu	Sultan Muhammad IV Stadium	30,000
Kuala Lumpur	Kuala Lumpur	Kuala Lumpur Stadium	18,000
Melaka United	Krubong	Hang Jebat Stadium	40,000
Negeri Sembilan	Seremban	Tuanku Abdul Rahman Stadium	45,000
Pahang	Kuantan	Darul Makmur Stadium	40,000
Perak	Ipoh	Perak Stadium, Ipoh; Naval Base Stadium, Lumut	42,500; 12,000
PKNP	Ipoh	Perak Stadium, Ipoh; Penang State Stadium, Batu Kawan	42,500; 40,000
PKNS	Shah Alam	Shah Alam Stadium	80,372
Selangor	Kuala Lumpur	Kuala Lumpur Stadium	18,000
Terengganu	Kuala Terengganu	Sultan Ismail Nasiruddin Shah Stadium	15,000

1: Perak plays at Lumut due to the upgrading of their own stadium at Perak Stadium
2: PKNP plays at Batu Kawan due to the upgrading of Perak Stadium
3: Kelantan plays their home games at their opponents stadium during Ramadan, due to ban of Sultan Muhammad IV Stadium usage by state government during Ramadan

=== Personnel, kit and sponsoring ===
Team	Head coach	Captain	Kit manufacturer	Main sponsor
Johor Darul Ta'zim	(Argentina) Raúl Longhi (caretaker)	(Singapore) Hariss Harun	Nike	Forest City
Kedah	(Malaysia) Nidzam Adzha	(Malaysia) Baddrol Bakhtiar	AL	ECK
Kelantan	(Malaysia) Yusri Che Lah (caretaker)	(Malaysia) Shahrizan Ismail	Lotto	BMW Raza Premium
Kuala Lumpur	(Brazil) Fábio Magrão	(Malaysia) Indra Putra Mahayuddin	SkyHawk	JL99, Ekovest
Melaka United	(Malaysia) E. Elavarasan	(Malaysia) Khairul Fahmi Che Mat	Warrix	EDRA CGN
Negeri Sembilan	(Portugal) Mário Lemos	(South Korea) Kim Do-heon	AL	Matrix Concepts
Pahang	(Malaysia) Dollah Salleh	(Malaysia) Matthew Davies	FILA	Aras Kuasa
Perak	(Australia) Mehmet Duraković	(Malaysia) Nasir Basharudin	AL	Lembaga Air Perak, Quest International University
PKNP	(Malaysia) Abu Bakar Fadzim	(Malaysia) Hafiz Ramdan	FILA	Perak Corp, MAPS
PKNS	(Malaysia) K. Rajagopal	(Malaysia) Safee Sali	Kappa	PKNS
Selangor	(Malaysia) Nazliazmi Nasir	(Malaysia) Amri Yahyah	Lotto	redONE, CRRC
Terengganu	(Malaysia) Irfan Bakti	(Ivory Coast) Kipré Tchétché	Kobert	Chicken Cottage

- Notes;
- Shahrel Fikri was the official captain of PKNP, before he was loaned to Nakhon Ratchasima, Hafiz Ramdan filled in as captain for PKNP.

=== Coaching changes ===
- Indicate the positions in the relegation zone.

Team	Outgoing coach	Manner of departure	Date of vacancy	Week	Table	Incoming coach	Date of appointment
PKNS	Sven Gartung	End of contract	31 October 2017	Pre-season		K. Rajagopal	22 November 2017
Kelantan	Zahasmi Ismail	End of contract	30 November 2017	Pre-season		Sathit Bensoh	7 December 2017
Kedah	Nidzam Adzha	Resigned	30 November 2017	Pre-season		Ramón Marcote	11 December 2017
Negeri Sembilan	Asri Ninggal	End of contract	30 November 2017	Pre-season		Jörg Steinebrunner	20 December 2017
Kelantan	Sathit Bensoh	Sacked	15 February 2018	3	12	Yusri Che Lah (caretaker)	16 February 2018
Johor Darul Ta'zim	Ulisses Morais	Resigned	25 February 2018	4	1	Raúl Longhi (caretaker)	26 February 2018
Negeri Sembilan	Jörg Steinebrunner	Resigned	28 February 2018	4	11	Azraai Khor	28 February 2018
Selangor	P. Maniam	Rested	14 March 2018	5	8	Nazliazmi Nasir (caretaker)	14 March 2018
Kelantan	Yusri Che Lah (caretaker)	End of caretaker role	19 March 2018	5	11	Fajr Ibrahim	21 March 2018
Kedah	Ramón Marcote	Move to development coach	28 March 2018	5	6	Nidzam Adzha	28 March 2018
Melaka United	Eduardo Almeida	Sacked	2 May 2018	8	7	E. Elavarasan	7 May 2018
Negeri Sembilan	Azraai Khor	Sacked	10 May 2018	10	12	Mario Lemos	10 May 2018
Kelantan	Fajr Ibrahim	Resigned	5 June 2018	14	12	Yusri Che Lah (caretaker)	5 June 2018

=== Foreign players ===
Southeast Asia (SEA) players need to have acquired at least 30 international caps for their senior national team with no period restriction on when caps are earned and those who has less than 30 international caps will be subjected to FMLLP approval.

Players name in bold indicates the player is registered during the mid-season transfer window.

Club	Player 1	Player 2	Player 3	AFC Player	ASEAN Player	Former Players
Johor Darul Ta'zim	(Brazil) Marcos António	(Argentina) **Fernando Elizari**	(Argentina) **Fernando Márquez**	(Iraq) Gonzalo Cabrera	(Singapore) Hariss Harun	(Argentina) Jorge Pereyra Díaz (Argentina) Luciano Figueroa (Martinique) **Harry Novillo** (Argentina) Nicolás Fernández (Brazil) **Jorge**
Kedah	(Kosovo) Liridon Krasniqi	(Brazil) Sandro	(Brazil) **Paulo Rangel**	(Indonesia) Andik Vermansyah	(Philippines) Álvaro Silva	(Spain) Pablo Pallarès
Kelantan	(Brazil) Cássio	(Brazil) **Cristiano**	(Kyrgyzstan) **Bakhtiyar Duyshobekov**			(Brazil) Bruno Lopes (Indonesia) Ferdinand Sinaga (Lebanon) Mohammed Ghaddar (Senegal) Morgaro Gomis (South Korea) Do Dong-hyun (Tunisia) **Alaeddine Bouslimi** (Namibia) **Lazarus Kaimbi**
Kuala Lumpur	(Brazil) Paulo Josué	(Brazil) Juninho	(Brazil) Guilherme de Paula	(Uzbekistan) Bobirjon Akbarov	(Indonesia) Achmad Jufriyanto	
Melaka United	(France) Steven Thicot	(Nigeria) **Ifedayo Olusegun**	(Belarus) Yahor Zubovich	(South Korea) **Lee Chang-hoon**	(Singapore) Shahdan Sulaiman	(Portugal) Tiago Gomes (South Korea) Jeon Woo-young
Negeri Sembilan	(Brazil) **Alex Moraes**	(Brazil) Flávio Júnior	(Argentina) Nicolás Vélez	(South Korea) Kim Do-heon	(Philippines) **Ángel Guirado**	(Cambodia) Prak Mony Udom (Latvia) Renārs Rode
Pahang	(The Gambia) Mohamadou Sumareh	(Nigeria) **Austin Amutu**	(Brazil) Patrick Cruz	(Japan) **Issey Nakajima-Farran**	(Singapore) Safuwan Baharudin	(Argentina) Sergio Unrein (Brazil) Alex Moraes (Cambodia) Chan Vathanaka (Liberia) Francis Doe
Perak	(Brazil) Leandro	(Brazil) Wander Luiz	(Brazil) Gilmar	(Lebanon) **Jad Noureddine**		(Philippines) Misagh Bahadoran (Australia) Robert Cornthwaite
PKNP	(Latvia) Ritus Krjauklis	(Central African Republic) Franklin Anzité	(Chad) **Karl Max**	(South Korea) **Kim Sang-woo**		(Cambodia) Keo Sokpheng (South Korea) Yeon Gi-sung (Bulgaria) Lyuben Nikolov (Ghana) **Alfred Okai Quaye**
PKNS	(Colombia) Romel Morales	(Brazil) **Bruno Matos**	(Brazil) Rafael Ramazotti	(Australia) Zac Anderson	(Singapore) Faris Ramli	(Argentina) Jonathan Acosta
Selangor	(Brazil) Willian Pacheco	(Spain) Alfonso de la Cruz	(Spain) Rufino Segovia	(Indonesia) Evan Dimas	(Indonesia) Ilham Armaiyn	
Terengganu	(Serbia) Igor Zonjić	(England) Lee Tuck	(Ivory Coast) Kipré Tchétché	(South Korea) **Do Dong-hyun**	(Cambodia) Thierry Bin	(South Korea) Kim Hyun-woo (South Korea) Lee Jun-hyeob (Japan) Bruno Suzuki

=== Naturalisation players ===
Club	Player 1	Player 2	Player 3	Player 4	Player 5
Johor Darul Ta'zim	(Sweden) (England) (Malaysia) **Junior Eldstål**^{3} ^{4}	(England) (Malaysia) **Darren Lok**^{3} ^{4}	(Spain) (Malaysia) **Natxo Insa**^{3} ^{4}	(Canada) (Barbados) (Malaysia) La'Vere Corbin-Ong^{3} ^{4}	(Spain) (Malaysia) **Kiko Insa**^{3} ^{4}
Melaka United	(New Zealand) (Malaysia) **Khair Jones**^{3} ^{4}	(England) (Malaysia) Nicholas Swirad^{3}			
Negeri Sembilan	(Australia) (Malaysia) David Rowley^{3}				
Pahang	(Australia) (Malaysia) **Matthew Davies**^{3} ^{4}				
Perak	(Australia) (Malaysia) **Brendan Gan**^{3} ^{4}				
PKNS	(England) (Malaysia) Daniel Ting^{3}				

Notes:

^3 Carrying Malaysian heritage.
^4 Participated in the Malaysia national team squad.

== Results ==
=== League table ===
Pos	Team	Pld	W	D	L	GF	GA	GD	Pts	Qualification or relegation
1	Johor Darul Ta'zim (C)	22	19	2	1	47	9	+38	59	Qualification for the AFC Champions League group stage
2	Perak	22	10	6	6	35	27	+8	36	Qualification for the AFC Champions League second preliminary round
3	PKNS	22	10	5	7	37	29	+8	35	
4	Pahang	22	9	7	6	35	21	+14	34	
5	Terengganu	22	10	4	8	32	31	+1	34	
6	Kedah	22	9	5	8	37	36	+1	32	
7	Melaka United	22	9	4	9	33	38	−5	31	
8	Selangor	22	7	6	9	35	39	−4	27	
9	PKNP	22	7	4	11	25	31	−6	25	
10	Kuala Lumpur	22	7	3	12	39	51	−12	24	
11	Kelantan (R)	22	5	3	14	20	43	−23	18	Relegation to the Premier League
12	Negeri Sembilan (R)	22	4	3	15	27	47	−20	15	Relegation to the Premier League

Source: FAM, FMLLP
Rules for classification: 1) Points; 2) Goal difference; 3) Number of goals scored.
(C) Champions; (R) Relegated

=== Result table ===
Home \ Away	JDT	KED	KEL	KLU	MEL	NSE	PAH	PRK	PKP	PKN	SEL	TRG
Johor DT	—	2–1	4–0	2–0	3–0	2–0	1–0	2–0	3–0	3–0	2–0	2–0
Kedah	1–2	—	1–2	3–2	0–2	3–3	2–0	1–3	1–3	2–1	4–0	1–1
Kelantan	1–2	0–1	—	4–2	1–1	0–2	2–1	3–2	1–2	0–2	2–1	1–1
Kuala Lumpur	1–0	4–3	5–1	—	3–4	2–1	2–2	1–5	1–1	2–1	0–2	3–0
Melaka United	0–4	4–1	2–1	2–4	—	3–0	2–2	1–2	2–0	1–1	3–2	0–3
Negeri Sembilan	0–4	1–2	1–1	2–0	1–3	—	1–3	1–1	1–2	3–1	3–1	1–2
Pahang	1–2	2–2	3–0	4–0	2–0	4–0	—	0–0	0–0	1–0	1–1	0–1
Perak	1–2	0–0	1–0	3–0	0–0	2–0	1–1	—	4–3	0–2	3–0	3–2
PKNP	1–2	0–1	2–0	2–1	1–2	1–0	1–2	1–2	—	0–1	0–2	2–1
PKNS	0–0	3–4	1–0	3–2	2–0	5–3	1–0	4–1	1–1	—	2–2	4–0
Selangor	2–2	1–2	4–0	3–3	4–1	2–1	1–3	1–1	1–1	2–1	—	2–0
Terengganu	0–1	1–1	2–0	3–1	1–0	3–2	1–3	2–0	2–1	2–2	4–1	—

Updated to match(es) played on 29 July 2018. Source: FAM, FMLLP
Legend: Blue = home team win; Yellow = draw; Red = away team win.
For upcoming matches, an "a" indicates there is an article about the rivalry between the two participants.

=== Positions by round ===
Leader
Relegation to 2019 Liga Premier

Team \ Round	1	2	3	4	5	6	7	8	9	10	11	12	13	14	15	16	17	18	19	20	21	22
Johor Darul Ta'zim	2	2	2	1	1	1	1	1	1	1	1	1	1	1	1	1	1	1	1	1	1	1
Perak	8	3	7	9	6	4	3	3	2	2	2	2	3	3	2	2	2	2	2	2	2	2
Pahang	7	10	6	3	2	2	2	2	3	3	3	3	2	2	3	3	4	5	3	4	3	4
PKNS	5	4	1	4	3	5	5	6	4	4	6	6	6	6	6	6	6	6	6	3	5	3
Terengganu	6	8	5	2	5	3	4	4	5	5	4	4	5	5	5	5	5	3	5	6	4	5
Kedah	9	11	8	6	7	6	6	5	6	6	5	5	4	4	4	4	3	4	4	5	6	6
PKNP	4	7	11	8	10	9	9	7	7	7	7	7	8	8	9	10	10	10	8	8	10	9
Selangor	1	1	3	5	8	10	8	10	9	8	9	9	9	9	8	8	7	8	9	9	8	8
Kuala Lumpur	12	12	10	12	9	8	10	8	8	9	8	8	7	7	7	9	8	9	10	10	9	10
Melaka United	3	6	4	7	4	7	7	9	10	10	10	10	10	10	10	7	9	7	7	7	7	7
Kelantan	10	9	12	10	11	11	11	11	11	11	11	11	12	12	12	12	12	11	11	12	12	11
Negeri Sembilan	11	5	9	11	12	12	12	12	12	12	12	12	11	11	11	11	11	12	12	11	11	12

== Season statistics ==
=== Top scorers ===
As of matches played on 29 July 2018.

Players sorted first by goals, then by last name.

Rank	Player	Club	Goals
1	(Spain) Rufino Segovia	Selangor	19
2	(Ivory Coast) Kipré Tchétché	Terengganu	14
3	(Brazil) Guilherme de Paula	Kuala Lumpur	13
4	(Belarus) Yahor Zubovich	Melaka United	12
5	(Brazil) Gilmar	Perak	11
6	(Argentina) Gonzalo Cabrera	Johor Darul Ta'zim	9
7	(Brazil) Flávio Júnior	Negeri Sembilan	8
7	(Nigeria) Ifedayo Olusegun	Melaka United	8
7	(Argentina) Nicolás Vélez	Negeri Sembilan	8
7	(Brazil) Sandro	Kedah	8

=== Top assists ===
Players sorted first by assists, then by last name.

Rank	Player	Club	Assists
1	(Brazil) Paulo Josué	Kuala Lumpur	9
2	(Argentina) Gonzalo Cabrera	Johor Darul Ta'zim	7
3	(Malaysia) Akhyar Rashid	Kedah	6
3	(Brazil) Bruno Matos	PKNS	6
3	(Malaysia) Hafiz Ramdan	PKNP	6
3	(Singapore) Safuwan Baharudin	Pahang	6

=== Hat-tricks ===
Player	For	Against	Result	Date
(South Korea) Do Dong-hyun	Kelantan	Perak	3–2 (H)	24 February 2018
(Spain) Rufino Segovia	Selangor	Kelantan	4–0 (H)	1 June 2018
(Ivory Coast) Kipré Tchétché	Terengganu	Negeri Sembilan	3–2 (H)	27 June 2018
(Spain) Rufino Segovia	Selangor	Kuala Lumpur	3–3 (H)	15 July 2018

Notes:
(H) – Home; (A) – Away

=== Own goals ===
As of 28 July 2018

Rank	Player	For	Against	Date	Goals
1	(Malaysia) K. Reuben	PKNS	Kedah	25 February 2018	1
1	(Malaysia) Ganiesh Gunasegaran	PKNP	Kuala Lumpur	25 February 2018	1
1	(Malaysia) Saifulnizam Miswan	Kuala Lumpur	PKNP	27 June 2018	1
1	(Malaysia) Nasriq Baharom	Negeri Sembilan	Melaka United	28 July 2018	1

=== Clean sheets ===
As of matches played on 28 July 2018.

Rank	Player	Club	Clean sheets
1	(Malaysia) Farizal Marlias	Johor Darul Ta'zim	13
2	(Malaysia) Helmi Eliza Elias	Pahang	7
3	(Malaysia) Hafizul Hakim	Perak	6
4	(Malaysia) Shahril Saa'ri	PKNS	5
5	(Malaysia) Wan Azraie	Terengganu	3
5	(Malaysia) Ramadhan Hamid	Kedah	3

== See also ==
- 2018 Malaysia Premier League
- 2018 Malaysia FAM Cup
- 2018 Malaysia FA Cup
- 2018 Malaysia Cup
- 2018 Malaysia Challenge Cup
- 2018 Piala Presiden
- 2018 Piala Belia
- List of Malaysian football transfers 2018
