= FAM-MSN Project =

- Full name: FAM-MSN Project Squad
- Short name: FMPS
- Founded: 10 December 2020; 5 years ago
- Ground: UiTM Stadium
- Capacity: 10,000
- Coordinates: 3°3′56.484″N 101°29′51.756″E
- Owner(s): FAM; NSC
- Chairman: Mohd Joehari Mohd Ayub
- Head coach: Noor Zaidi Rohmat
- League: MFL Cup
Home colours	Away colours

The FAM-MSN Project Squad, also known as the Skuad Projek FAM-NSC, is a developmental football team located in Kuala Lumpur, Malaysia. The team functions under the oversight of the Football Association of Malaysia (FAM) and the National Sports Council of Malaysia (NSC). It is intended to prioritize the growth and advancement of football in the country, as well as developing national team players. Established in 2020, the team made its first appearance in the 2021 Malaysia Premier League, but as of 2023 it competes in the MFL Cup. Its home base is the UiTM Stadium in the city of Shah Alam.

== History ==
On 10 December 2020, the Football Association of Malaysia (FAM) and the National Sports Council (MSN) created the FAM-MSN Project Squad. This collaboration was intended to provide a nurturing platform for emerging football talent and create a clear career path for the products of the National Football Development Program (PPBN) and graduates from the Mokhtar Dahari Academy (AMD) into senior football.

Former national player Yusri Che Lah was appointed to coach the side, which became the 11th team to play in the Premier League, as one of the measures to expose them to competitive football throughout the season.

=== First season ===
On 6 March 2021, FAM-MSN Project played their first match against Terengganu II at Sultan Ismail Nasiruddin Shah Stadium, losing 0–4. The team scored their first goal three days later against Kelantan FC, though they ended up losing 1–2. Azhad Harraz scored the team's first and only goal in the 7th minute. Eventually, he became the top scorer for the team in the first season, scoring 8 goals. In the 2021 season, the team scored 12 goals, with goal scorers including Azhad Harraz, Farris Izdiham, Izuddin Muhamad Asri, Ismat Imran, and Safwan Mazlan. They had the first victory after 18 games, winning 1–0 against Kelantan United.

== Kit manufacturers and sponsors ==
FAM-MSN Squad first home kit

The team badge's colors include yellow, black, neon white, medium Persian blue, dark midnight blue, and pigment red. The team's home kit colors are yellow and black. On 1 March 2021, the FAM-MSN Project Squad announced KELME as the official manufacturer for a period of two years. A sponsorship agreement worth RM 500,000 was signed. On 28 February 2023, the FAM-MSN Project Squad announced the brand Puma through Active Sports as the team's official jersey partner for the season. The sponsorship agreement was worth RM 350,000.00 for one year.

Period	Kit manufacturer	Shirt sponsor	Ref.
2021–2022	(Spain) Kelme	—	
2023	(Germany) Puma	(Malaysia) Active Sports	

== Players ==
=== Current squad ===
Note: Flags indicate national team as defined under FIFA eligibility rules; some limited exceptions apply. Players may hold more than one non-FIFA nationality.

No.	Pos.	Nation	Player
1	GK	MAS	Izzul Azri Mansor
2	DF	MAS	Aqil Rozaidi
3	DF	MAS	Sahil Husni
4	DF	MAS	Syafiq Hisham
5	DF	MAS	Zachary Zahidadil
6	DF	MAS	Adli Ahamad
7	FW	MAS	Harith Najwan
8	MF	MAS	Sheikh Mohammad Faris
9	FW	MAS	Wesley Milkias
10	MF	MAS	Hazim Jamal
11	FW	MAS	Haikal Sahar
12	MF	MAS	Farish Daniel
13	DF	MAS	Firas Akmal
14	MF	MAS	Syukran Pauzi
15	MF	MAS	Izz Qhuzaidi

No.	Pos.	Nation	Player
16	MF	MAS	Adam Haris
17	FW	MAS	Nur Haikal
18	FW	MAS	Saffy Zikri
19	GK	MAS	Nabil Asyraf (captain)
20	FW	MAS	Zahir Syakil
21	GK	MAS	Aiman Haziq
22	GK	MAS	Hazeem Iman
23	DF	MAS	Daniel Iman
24	DF	MAS	Sean Daniel
25	MF	MAS	Adam Haikal
26	DF	MAS	Syakir Zufayri
27	DF	MAS	Zuryhakim Zafran
28	MF	MAS	Danial Mohd Nor
29	FW	MAS	Tamotehran Jayashanker
30	DF	MAS	Alias Alan

== Technical staff ==
Name	Position
(Malaysia) Mohd Joehari Mohd Ayub	Team manager
(Malaysia) Halim Shah Abd Hamid	Assistant manager
(Malaysia) Noor Zaidi Rohmat	Head coach
(Malaysia) Shahrom Abdul Kalam	Assistant coach
(Malaysia) Mohd Hamsani Ahmad	Goalkeeper coach
(Malaysia) Dharmendra Mahalingam	Fitness coach
(Malaysia) Rosidi Mohamad Aidee Ikram	Team doctor
(Malaysia) Mohd Khairuddin Omar	Team doctor
(Malaysia) Firdaus Ahmayuddin	Team doctor
(Malaysia) Ridzuan Azmi	Team doctor
(Malaysia) Mohd Fikri Hakim Said	Physiotherapist

== Head coaches ==
No.	Head coach	From	To	Ref.
1	(Malaysia) Yusri Che Lah	10 December 2020	10 December 2021	
2	(Malaysia) Hassan Sazali Waras	1 January 2022	7 November 2022	
3	(Malaysia) Noor Zaidi Rohmat	2 March 2023^{1}	present	

^{1} The date when the first game was coached.

== Records and statistics ==
=== List of seasons ===
As of 2023, the FAM-MSN Project has completed three seasons. In total, they have won 6 out of the 52 matches played. In 2023, they moved from the Premier League to the MFL Cup due to its status as a development team.

Season	League	Pld	W	D	L	GF	GA	GD	Pts	Pos	Top goalscorers	Goals
2021	Premier League	20	1	3	16	12	56	−44	6	11th	(Malaysia) Azhad Harraz	8
2022	Premier League	18	2	2	14	10	33	−23	8	10th	(Malaysia) Farris Izdiham	3
2023	MFL Cup	14	3	1	10	11	27	−16	10	7th (Note: Position in Group A.)	(Malaysia) Zahir Syakil (Malaysia) Nur Haikal	2

=== Goalscorers ===
- First goal: Azhad Harraz vs. Kelantan in 2021 Premier League (9 March 2021)
- Most goals in a season: 8 – Azhad Harraz, 2021
- Fastest goal: 1 minute – Harith Najwan vs. PDRM U-23 in 2023 MFL Cup (2 March 2023)

==== Overall scorers ====
Current players on the FAM-MSN Project squad are shown in italic.

As of 21 June 2023

Rank	Player	Period	Goals
1	(Malaysia) Azhad Harraz	2021	8
2	(Malaysia) Farris Izdiham	2021–2022	4
3	(Malaysia) Hazwan Hassan	2021–2022	2
3	(Malaysia) Izzat Zikri	2022	2
3	(Malaysia) Zahir Syakil	2023–present	2
3	(Malaysia) Nur Haikal	2023–present	2

=== Clean sheets ===
- First clean sheet: Al-Iman Wahiey vs. Perak II in 2021 Premier League (23 April 2021)

==== Overall clean sheets ====
Current players on the FAM-MSN Project squad are shown in italic.

As of 21 June 2023

Rank	Player	Period	Clean sheets
1	(Malaysia) Al-Iman Wahiey	2021–2022	3
2	(Malaysia) Nabil Asyraf Ramli	2021–present	2
3	(Malaysia) Haziq Mukriz	2021	1
3	(Malaysia) Aizat Aiman Mazlan	2021–2022	1
3	(Malaysia) Hazeem Iman	2023–present	1

== See also ==
- Malaysia national football team
- Malaysia national under-23 football team
- Harimau Muda A
- Harimau Muda B
- Harimau Muda C
- LionsXII
- Singa Muda Perlis F.C.
