= 2023 MFL Cup =

Malaysian football season

MFL Cup
- Dates: 2 March - 11 November 2023
- Country: Malaysia
- Champions: Terengganu II
- Matches: 127
- Goals: 290 (2.28 per match)
- Best player: Ubaidullah Shamsul (Terengganu F.C. II)
- Top goalscorer: Ebenezer Assifuah (16 goals)
- Biggest home win: 4 goals KDA FC B 4–0 FAM-MSN Project (15 March 2023)
- Biggest away win: 3 goals KDA FC B 1-3 Terengganu F.C. II (3 March 2023)
- Highest scoring: 5 goals Perak F.C. II 3-2 Kuching City F.C. (3 March 2023)
- Highest attendance: 412; Terengganu F.C. II 2-0 Penang F.C. (10 March 2023)

The 2023 MFL Cup (Malay: Piala MFL 2023) is the 1st season of the MFL Cup, the reserve football tournament in Malaysia. It is organized by the Malaysian Football League (MFL), after the restructure of Malaysia Premier League, with 15 teams confirmed to participate.

== Age limit ==
The reserve tournament is dedicated to players under the age of 23. The MFL has also allowed a quota of 5 over-age players, including 3 foreigners.

== Format ==
The tournament is played as follows:

- League level: 15 teams are divided into two groups, namely group A will consist of 8 teams and group B will consist of 7 teams each drawn from the Central Zone, North, South, East, Borneo and Club 1 State.
  - Round 1 Divided into two groups, each team will play at home and away to determine the position in the group. The top four teams in each group will advance to Round 2
  - Round 2 Consists of a group of eight teams, each team will play at home and away to determine the position in the group. The top two teams in the group will advance to the knockout stages
- Knockout stage: The knockout stage is the final match to determine the winner, it will be played in a single match.

== Teams and stadiums ==
Team	Location	Stadium	Capacity
Johor Darul Ta'zim II	Pasir Gudang, Johor	Pasir Gudang Corporation Stadium	15,000
Kedah Darul Aman B	Alor Setar	Darul Aman Stadium	32,387
Kelantan	Kota Bharu	Sultan Muhammad IV Stadium	22,000
Kelantan United	Kota Bharu	Sultan Muhammad IV Stadium	22,000
Kuala Lumpur City Extension	Kuala Lumpur	Kuala Lumpur Stadium	18,000
Kuching City	Kuching	Sarawak State Stadium	26,000
Negeri Sembilan	Seremban	Tuanku Abdul Rahman Stadium	45,000
PDRM	Shah Alam	UiTM Stadium	10,000
Penang	George Town	City Stadium, Penang	25,000
Perak II	Manjung	Manjung Municipal Council Stadium	17,000
Sabah	Kota Kinabalu	Likas Stadium	35,000
Selangor U-23	Shah Alam	UiTM Stadium	10,000
Sri Pahang	Kuantan	Darul Makmur Stadium	40,000
FAM-MSN Project	Shah Alam	UiTM Stadium	10,000
Terengganu II	Kuala Terengganu	Sultan Ismail Nasiruddin Shah Stadium	15,000

=== Draws ===
The draw ceremony was held on 31 January 2023, at 15:00 (MST) which was broadcast live on YouTube MFL.

Central Zone Teams Kuala Lumpur City Selangor U-23 PDRM FAM-MSN Project	North Zone Teams Kedah Darul Aman B Perak II Penang	South Zone Teams Johor Darul Ta'zim II Negeri Sembilan	East Zone Teams Terengganu II Sri Pahang	Borneo Zone Teams Sabah Kuching City	1 State Clubs Teams Kelantan Kelantan United

== Group stage ==
=== Group A ===
Pos	Team	Pld	W	D	L	GF	GA	GD	Pts	Relegation	TER	JDT	PDM	KED	PEN	SAB	FMP	KLU
1	Terengganu II	14	11	1	2	21	7	+14	34	Advance to Champions Round	—	1–2	3–1	0–1	2–0	1–0	1–0	4–1
2	Johor Darul Ta'zim II	14	9	2	3	31	12	+19	29	Advance to Champions Round	0–1	—	3–0	1–0	1–0	7–0	2–0	2–0
3	PDRM	14	9	1	4	22	14	+8	28	Advance to Champions Round	0–1	2–2	—	2–1	0–1	2–1	3–0	3–1
4	Kedah Darul Aman B	14	8	1	5	18	12	+6	25	Advance to Champions Round	1–3	2–1	0–2	—	1–0	1–0	4–0	1–0
5	Penang	14	7	1	6	14	14	0	22		1–2	3–2	0–2	2–1	—	1–1	2–0	1–0
6	Sabah	14	3	3	8	14	24	−10	12		0–0	1–1	0–1	1–3	1–0	—	3–1	4–1
7	FAM-MSN Project	14	3	1	10	11	27	−16	10		0–1	2–5	1–2	0–0	1–2	3–1	—	1–0
8	Kelantan United	14	1	0	13	6	27	−21	3									—

Updated to match(es) played on 25 July 2023. Source: MFL
Legend: Blue = home team win; Yellow = draw; Red = away team win.
For upcoming matches, an "a" indicates there is an article about the rivalry between the two participants.
Rules for classification: 1) Points; 2) Goal difference; 3) Number of goals scored.

=== Group B ===
Pos	Team	Pld	W	D	L	GF	GA	GD	Pts	Relegation	SEL	KUL	SRI	PRK	NSE	KUC	KEL
1	Selangor U-23	12	6	4	2	17	9	+8	22	Advance to Champions Round	—	0–1	2–1	2–1	0–0	0–1	3–0
2	Kuala Lumpur City	12	5	5	2	13	7	+6	20	Advance to Champions Round	1–1	—	1–0	0–1	3–1	3–0	1–0
3	Sri Pahang	12	4	4	4	13	13	0	16	Advance to Champions Round	0–2	0–0	—	1–0	1–1	1–0	3–0
4	Perak II	12	4	4	4	11	12	−1	16	Advance to Champions Round	1–1	1–1	3–1	—	0–2	3–2	0–0
5	Negeri Sembilan	12	2	9	1	12	10	+2	15		2–2	0–0	0–0	2–0	—	2–2	0–0
6	Kuching City	12	2	4	6	12	18	−6	10		0–1	1–0	3–3	0–1	2–2	—	2–3
7	Kelantan	12	1	6	5	10	19	−9	9		1–3	2–2	1–2	0–0	0–0	1–1	—

Updated to match(es) played on 25 July 2023. Source: MFL
Legend: Blue = home team win; Yellow = draw; Red = away team win.
For upcoming matches, an "a" indicates there is an article about the rivalry between the two participants.
Rules for classification: 1) Points; 2) Goal difference; 3) Number of goals scored.

=== Champions Round ===
Pos	Team	Pld	W	D	L	GF	GA	GD	Pts		TER	JDT	SRI	SEL	PDM	KUL	PRK	KED
1	Terengganu II	7	5	2	0	9	4	+5	17	Advance to Final	—	2–1	2–1	2–1	TBD	1–0	0–0	2–1
2	Johor Darul Ta'zim II	7	4	2	1	10	4	+6	14	Advance to Final	1–2	—	2–0	1–0	1–1	1–1	1–0	3–0
3	Sri Pahang FC	7	3	2	2	7	8	−1	11		0–0	TBD	—	1–0	TBD	TBD	1–0	TBD
4	Selangor FC	7	3	1	3	11	6	+5	10		TBD	0–1	TBD	—	TBD	4–1	4–0	1–0
5	PDRM FC	7	2	4	1	10	7	+3	10		1–2	1–1	0–2	TBD	—	TBD	TBD	TBD
6	Kuala Lumpur City Extension	7	1	4	2	8	10	−2	7		TBD	1–1	1–1	1–4	2–2	—	TBD	TBD
7	Perak II	7	1	2	4	4	9	−5	5		TBD	TBD	0–1	TBD	1–1	TBD	—	3–0
8	Kedah Darul Aman B	7	0	1	6	5	16	−11	1		1–2	-	3–4	TBD	0–2	1–1	TBD	—

First match(es) will be played: 15 October 2023. Source: MFL
Rules for classification: 1) Points; 2) Goal difference; 3) Number of goals scored.

== Final ==
11 November 2023
20:15 (MST)

Terengganu II	1-0	JDT II
Isa Raman 88'	Report

Kuala Lumpur Stadium, Cheras
Attendance: 3,055
Referee: Mohd Fusser Bin Mad Sallih

== Winner ==
MFL Cup 2023 Champions
(Terengganu)

Terengganu II
1st title

== Top scorers ==
As of 31 July 2023

Ked	Pemain	Kelab	Gol
1	(Malaysia) Gabriel Nistelrooy	Johor Darul Ta'zim II	12
2	(Ghana) Ebenezer Assifuah	Kedah Darul Aman B	11
3	(Nigeria) Chukwu Chijioke	PDRM	9
4	(Malaysia) Daryl Sham	Johor Darul Ta'zim II	5
4	(Malaysia) Syahmi Zamri	Terengganu II	5
6	(Malaysia) Harith Akif	Kelantan	4
6	(Malaysia) Cornelius Ornley	Kuching City	4
6	(Malaysia) Harith Samsuri	Negeri Sembilan	4
6	(Senegal) Jacque Faye	PDRM	4
6	(Malaysia) Hakimi Isa	Perak II	4
6	(Malaysia) Azhad Harraz	Sabah	4
6	(Malaysia) Nasyrullah Zaki	Sri Pahang	4
6	(Malaysia) Muslihuddin Atiq	Terengganu II	4

== See also ==
- 2023 Piala Sumbangsih
- 2023 Malaysia Super League
- 2023 Malaysia M3 League
- 2023 Malaysia M4 League
- 2023 Malaysia M5 League
- 2023 Malaysia FA Cup
- 2023 Malaysia Cup
- 2023 MFL Challenge Cup
- 2023 Piala Presiden
