= Marco Ragini =

Sammarinese football manager

Personal information
- Date of birth: 30 November 1967 (age 58)
- Place of birth: San Marino

Team information
- Current team: Mongolia (head coach)

Senior career*
Years	Team	Apps	(Gls)
- SS Murata
- SP Cailungo
- SS Folgore Falciano

Managerial career
- 2014: Dainava
- 2015: Locarno
- 2015: MFK Dolný Kubín
- 2016: Ujana
- 2017: Garden City Panthers
- 2018: FC Ulaanbaatar
- 2019–2020: Lusitano FC
- 2021: Kelantan
- 2022: Tre Fiori
- 2024: Tajikistan U17
- 2025: Tajikistan U20
- 2026–: Mongolia
- * Club domestic league appearances and goals

Marco Ragini (born 30 November 1967) is a Sammarinese football manager and former player who is currently the head coach of Mongolia.

== Career ==
In 2014, Ragini was appointed manager of Lithuanian side Dainava. In 2015, he was appointed manager of Locarno in Switzerland. After that, he was appointed manager of Slovak club MFK Dolný Kubín. In 2016, Ragini was appointed manager of Ujana in the Democratic Republic of the Congo. In 2017, he was appointed manager of Nigerian team Garden City Panthers.

In 2018, he was appointed manager of FC Ulaanbaatar in Mongolia. In 2021, Ragini was appointed manager of Malaysian outfit Kelantan. In 2021, Marco Ragini served as head coach of Kelantan TRW in the Malaysia Super League. He led the team during the 2022 season of Malaysian football. In 2022, he was appointed manager of Tre Fiori in San Marino. In 2019, Ragini was appointed manager of Portuguese club Lusitano FC. In 2023, he joined the Tajikistan Football Federation as technical supervisor of the national teams.

In November 2024, Ragini was appointed manager of the Tajikistan national under-17 football team. In 2025, he continued in his role with the Tajikistan Football Federation and also took charge of the Tajikistan national under-20 football team.

In May 2026, Ragini was appointed manager of the Mongolia national football team.
