= Sathit Bensoh =

Thai footballer and manager

Personal information
- Full name: Sathit Bensoh
- Date of birth: 9 January 1976 (age 50)
- Place of birth: Hat Yai, Songkhla, Thailand

Senior career*
Years	Team	Apps	(Gls)
2001	Krung Thai Bank		

Managerial career
- 2010–2011: Bangkok Glass
- 2012: Hatyai
- 2014: Pattani
- 2015: Trang
- 2016: Satun United
- 2017–2018: Kelantan
- 2018–2019: Hatyai City
- 2020–2021: Surat Thani City
- 2023–: Police Tero (assistant)
- * Club domestic league appearances and goals

Sathit Bensoh (Thai: สาธิต เบ็ญโส๊ะ, born 9 January 1976) is a Thai football manager and a former footballer.

== Early life ==
Bensoh was born on 9 January 1976 in Hat Yai, Songkhla.

== Managerial career ==
Sathit has worked with Bangkok Glass, Hatyai, Pattani, Trang and Satun United in Thailand. In December 2016, Sathit signed a contract with Malaysian club Kelantan as an assistant coach.

=== Kelantan ===
Sathit started his work at Kelantan as the first assistant coach to Zahasmi Ismail in December 2016. On 12 October 2017, Sathit was appointed as interim coach for Kelantan. His first match as interim head coach was in a 3—1 win over Melaka United on 28 October 2017.

On 7 December 2017, Sathit was appointed as Kelantan's first team head coach.

On 15 January 2018, his contract was terminated after the first three matches of 2018 Malaysia Super League, which Kelantan drew 1 game and lost 2 games.

== Managerial statistics ==
As of 10 February 2018

Team	Nat	From	To	Record				
Team	Nat	From	To	G	W	D	L	Win %
Kelantan (interim)	Malaysia	2017	2017	1	1	0	0	100.00
Kelantan	Malaysia	2017	2018	3	0	1	2	0.00
