= Azhad Harraz =

Malaysian association football player

Personal information
- Full name: Azhad Harraz bin Arman
- Date of birth: 9 May 2003 (age 23)
- Place of birth: Semporna, Sabah, Malaysia
- Height: 1.71 m (5 ft 7 in)
- Position: Forward

Team information
- Current team: Sabah
- Number: 50

Youth career
- Akademi Tunas NFDP Sabah
- Akademi Mokhtar Dahari

Senior career*
Years	Team	Apps	(Gls)
2021	FAM–MSN	20	(8)
2022–	Sabah	11	(0)

International career
2021–	Malaysia U-23	1	(0)
- * Club domestic league appearances and goals as of 15 October 2022

Azhad Harraz Arman (born 9 May 2003) is a Malaysian professional football player. He plays as a forward for Sabah in the Malaysian League.

== Career ==
=== Club ===
Azhad made his professional debut with the FAM-MSN team in the 2021 Malaysia Premier League. He scored 8 goals in his first season. On the same season he was nominated for the best striker and best young player award at the FAM National Football Award.

On 28 November 2021, Azhad signed a 4 years contract with Sabah. He made his Malaysia Super League debut with Sabah against Melaka United on 5 April 2022 coming in as a substitute.

=== International ===
In October 2021, Azhad received his first called up to represent the Malaysia U-23 for the 2022 AFC U-23 Asian Cup qualification. He played in the last match against Thailand as Malaysia booked their placed into the final round of 2022 AFC U-23 Asian Cup.
