= 2023 Merlion Cup =

Tournament details
- Host country: Singapore
- Dates: 24–26 March
- Teams: 4 (from 1 confederation)
- Venue: 1 (in 1 host city)

Final positions
- Champions: Malaysia (1st title)
- Runners-up: Hong Kong
- Third place: Cambodia
- Fourth place: Singapore

Tournament statistics
- Matches played: 4
- Goals scored: 13 (3.25 per match)
- Top scorer(s): (Malaysia) Najmuddin Akmal (2 goals)

The 2023 Merlion Cup is an international men's under-23 football competition organised by the Football Association of Singapore (FAS).

== Participants ==
The following are the participants in this year's tournament:

- Singapore (Host)
- Malaysia
- Hong Kong
- Cambodia

== Venue ==
Singapore
Jalan Besar Stadium
Capacity: 6,000

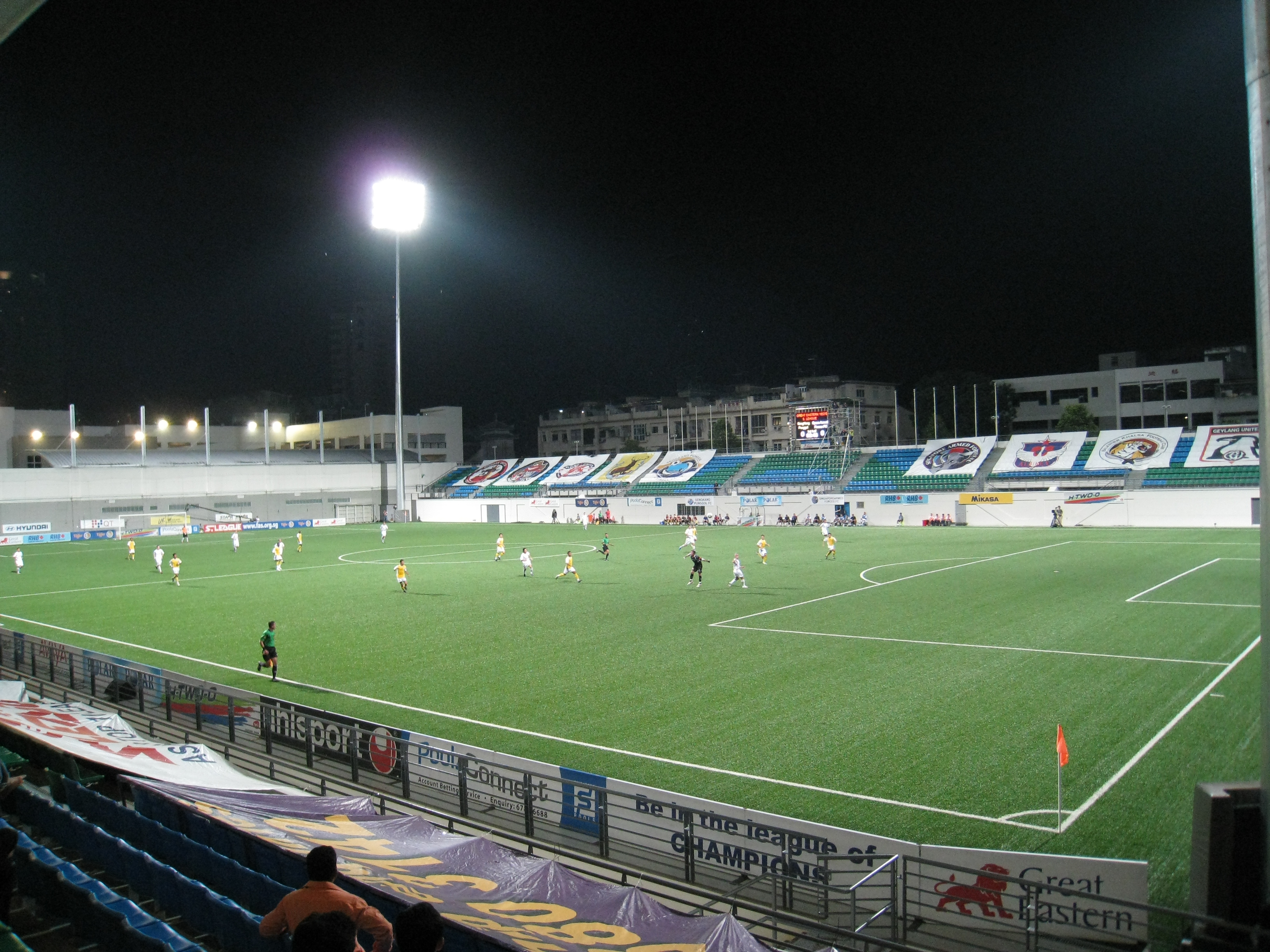

== Squads ==
A final squad of 23 players (three of whom must be goalkeepers) must be registered one day before the first match of the tournament.

== Fixtures ==
=== Bracket ===
The draw for the tournament was held on 6 March 2023.

Semi-finals
24 March
Cambodia | 2
Malaysia | 4
24 March
Singapore | 0
Hong Kong | 1

Final
26 March
Malaysia | 2
Hong Kong | 1
Third place match
26 March
Singapore | 1
Cambodia | 2

=== Semi-finals ===
24 March 2023
17:00 UTC+8

| Cambodia | 2–4 | Malaysia |
|---|---|---|
| L. Pisoth 36'; S. Chanthea 51' | Report | Haqimi 13'; V. Ruventhiran 29'; Tierney 62'; Najmuddin 73' |

Jalan Besar Stadium, Singapore
Referee: Clarence Leow (Singapore)
24 March 2023
20:30 UTC+8

| Singapore | 0–1 | Hong Kong |
|---|---|---|
| | Report | Ichikawa 40' |

Jalan Besar Stadium, Singapore
Referee: Farhad Mohamed (Singapore)

=== Third place match ===
26 March 2023
17:00 UTC+8

| Singapore | 1–2 | Cambodia |
|---|---|---|
| Emaviwe 74' | Report | Voeun Va 12'; Ky Rina 31' |

Jalan Besar Stadium, Singapore
Referee: Syarqawi Buhari (Singapore)

=== Final ===
26 March 2023
20:30 UTC+8

| Malaysia | 2–1 | Hong Kong |
|---|---|---|
| Najmuddin 74'; Safwan 78' | Report | Lau Ka Kiu 80' |

Jalan Besar Stadium, Singapore
Referee: Ahmad A'Qashah (Singapore)

== Final standing ==
| Rank | Team |
|---|---|
| 1st place, gold medalist(s) | Malaysia |
| 2nd place, silver medalist(s) | Hong Kong |
| 3rd place, bronze medalist(s) | Cambodia |
| 4 | Singapore |

== Statistics ==
=== Goalscorers ===
There were 13 goals scored in 4 matches, for an average of 3.25 goals per match.

2 goals

- (Malaysia) Najmuddin Akmal

1 goal

- (Cambodia) Lim Pisoth
- (Cambodia) Ky Rina
- (Cambodia) Sieng Chanthea
- (Cambodia) Voeun Va
- (Hong Kong) Lau Ka Kiu
- (Hong Kong) Sohgo Ichikawa
- (Malaysia) Fergus Tierney
- (Malaysia) Haqimi Azim
- (Malaysia) Safwan Mazlan
- (Malaysia) V. Ruventhiran
- (Singapore) Jordan Emaviwe
