= Amier Ali =

Malaysian footballer

Personal information
- Full name: Mohd Amier bin Mohd Ali
- Date of birth: 2000 (age 25–26)
- Place of birth: Malaysia
- Position: Right-back

Team information
- Current team: PDRM

Youth career
- –2020: Perak U21

Senior career*
Years	Team	Apps	(Gls)
2021	Perak	1	(0)
2021	Perak II	15	(0)
2022–	PDRM	12	(0)
- * Club domestic league appearances and goals as of 3 September 2021

Mohd Amier bin Mohd Ali (born 2000) is a Malaysian professional footballer who plays as a right-back for Malaysia Premier League club PDRM.

== Club career ==
=== Perak ===
On 9 May 2021, Amier made his Malaysia Super League debut for the club in a 2–3 loss to Sri Pahang.
