= 2024–25 MFL Cup =

MFL Cup
- Season: 2024–25
- Dates: 20 May 2024 – 14 April 2025
- Champions: Johor Darul Ta'zim II
- Matches: 46
- Goals: 121 (2.63 per match)
- Top goalscorer: Gabriel Nistelrooy (19 goals)
- Highest attendance: 550 (Penang II 1–1 Kedah Darul Aman B) (27 May 2024)
- Lowest attendance: 28 (Perak II 1–2 Sri Pahang U23 (9 July 2024)
- Attendance: 6,355 (138 per match)

The 2024–25 MFL Cup, a reserve football tournament in Malaysia, is organized by the Malaysian Football League (MFL). The tournament was established following the restructuring of the Malaysia Premier League. A total of 13 teams have been confirmed to participate in the competition. This is the last edition of the MFL Cup competition before it is abolished.

== Age limit ==
The reserve tournament is limited to players under the age of 23. The MFL has also permitted a quota of five over-age players, including three foreigners.

== Format changes ==
The tournament will be played in a single-group format, where each team will face every other team at home and away in a round-robin fashion. The team that tops the standings after all group matches will be crowned champions.

== Teams and stadiums ==
Team	Location	Stadium	Capacity
Perak FC II	Ipoh	Perak Stadium	42,500
Kuching City FC II	Kuching	Sarawak State Stadium	40,000
Sri Pahang FC II	Temerloh	Temerloh Mini Stadium	40,000
Sabah FC II	Kota Kinabalu	Likas Stadium	35,000
Kedah Darul Aman FC II	Alor Setar	Darul Aman Stadium	32,387
Pulau Pinang FC II	George Town	City Stadium, Penang	25,000
Kelantan Darul Naim FC II	Kota Bharu	Sultan Muhammad IV Stadium	22,000
Kuala Lumpur City FC II	Kuala Lumpur	Kuala Lumpur Stadium	18,000
PDRM FC II	Selayang	Selayang Stadium	16,000
Terengganu II	Kuala Terengganu	Sultan Ismail Nasiruddin Shah Stadium	15,000
Johor Darul Ta'zim II	Pasir Gudang, Johor	Pasir Gudang Corporation Stadium	15,000
Selangor FC II	Shah Alam	UiTM Stadium	10,000
Negeri Sembilan FC II	Tampin	Tampin Mini Stadium	3,000

=== Staff, kits and sponsors ===
Team	Head Coach	Captain	Kits Manufacture	Sponsor
Johor Darul Ta'zim II	(Spain) Juan Miguel Munoz	(Malaysia) Gabriel Nistelrooy Tamin	(United States) Nike	JDT Fan Token
Kedah Darul Aman	(Malaysia) Khairul Ismail	(Malaysia) Afeeq Iqmal	(Malaysia) ALX	
Kelantan Darul Naim	(Malaysia) Khairan Eroza Razali	(Malaysia) Syahir Ab Rashid	(Malaysia) PUC Sport	Visit Kelantan 2024
Kuala Lumpur City	(Malaysia) Nidzam Adzha	(Malaysia) Khairul Naim Zainal Abidin	(Malaysia) HUNDRED	UBB Amanah Berhad, KL Bandaraya Rendah Karbon
Kuching City	(Belarus) Oleg Kuzmianok	(Malaysia) Abang Muhammad Haiqal	(Malaysia) StarSports	Press Metal
Negeri Sembilan	(Malaysia) Ishak Kunju	(Malaysia) Vimal Nair Sugu	(Spain) Kelme	Matrix Concept, Negeri Roadstone, MBI NS
PDRM	(Malaysia) Azmi Mohamed	(Malaysia) Iqbal Azmi	(Italy) Lotto	redONE
Penang II	(Malaysia) Manzoor Azwira	(Malaysia) Aidil Danial Izhar	(Malaysia) Kakijersi	Penang2030, Bertam Resort
Perak II	(Malaysia) Chan Wing Hoong	(Malaysia) Hafizy Daniel Termizi	(Malaysia) Cheetah	XOX
Sabah	(Malaysia) Johnny Dominicus	(Malaysia) Alias Alan	(Italy) Lotto	Jetama
Selangor II	(Malaysia) Abdifitaah Hassan	(Malaysia) Muhammad Abu Khalil	(Spain) Joma	PKNS, MBI
Sri Pahang	(Malaysia) Yazeed Hamzah		(Malaysia) Voltra	Invest in Pahang
Terengganu II	(Malaysia) Hairuddin Omar	(Malaysia) Syafiq Danial Romzi	(Malaysia) ALX	Agarbomb Performance

== Foreign players ==
Club	Player 1	Player 2	Player 3	Player 4
Johor Darul Ta'zim II	(Brazil) Murilo	(Republic of Ireland) Shane Lowry	(Brazil) Heberty	
Kedah Darul Aman B				
Kelantan Darul Naim				
Kuala Lumpur City Extension	(New Zealand) Lawton Green	(Australia) Giancarlo Gallifuoco	(Bosnia and Herzegovina) Jovan Motika	
Kuching City	(Brazil) Nando Welter	(Ivory Coast) Kipré Tchétché	(Japan) Yuki Tanigawa	
Negeri Sembilan	(South Korea) An Sang-su			
PDRM	(Nigeria) Aremu Timothy	(South Korea) Um-Deuk		
Penang II	(Brazil) Neto			
Perak II	(Kyrgyzstan) Adilet Kanybekov			
Sabah II	(Greece) Haris Stamboulidis	(Brazil) Gabriel Peres	(Portugal) Telmo Castanheira	(South Korea) Park Tae-soo
Selangor	(Ghana) Alex Agyarkwa	(Venezuela) Yohandry Orozco	(Afghanistan) Omid Musawi	
Sri Pahang	(Liberia) Kpah Sherman			
Terengganu II	(Nigeria) Chukwu Chijioke			

Source:https://cms.fam.org.my/v1/teams

== Standings ==
=== League table ===
Pos	Team	Pld	W	D	L	GF	GA	GD	Pts	Promotion, qualification or relegation
1	Johor Darul Ta'zim II (C)	24	16	5	3	56	16	+40	53	Relocated to 2025–26 Malaysia A1 Semi-Pro League
2	Selangor II	24	16	4	4	61	24	+37	52	Relocated to 2025–26 Malaysia A1 Semi-Pro League
3	Terengganu II	24	12	8	4	47	23	+24	44	Relocated to 2025–26 Piala Presiden (Malaysia)
4	Kuala Lumpur City Extension	24	10	9	5	32	23	+9	39	Dissolved. (Note: MFL Cup dissolved for 2025 season.)
5	Sri Pahang	24	10	8	6	38	34	+4	38	Dissolved.
6	Kelantan Darul Naim	24	10	5	9	31	43	−12	35	Dissolved.
7	Perak II	24	9	7	8	29	28	+1	34	Dissolved.
8	Negeri Sembilan	24	7	8	9	19	20	−1	29	Dissolved.
9	PDRM	24	8	4	12	28	36	−8	28	Dissolved.
10	Kedah Darul Aman B	24	7	4	13	22	42	−20	25	Dissolved.
11	Penang II	24	6	6	12	34	49	−15	24	Relocated to 2025–26 Piala Presiden (Malaysia)
12	Sabah II	24	4	4	16	31	60	−29	16	Relocated to 2025–26 Piala Presiden (Malaysia)
13	Kuching City	24	3	4	17	21	51	−30	13	Dissolved.

Source: FAM-CMS
Rules for classification: 1) Points; 2) Goal difference; 3) Number of goals scored.
(C) Champions

== Results ==
Home \ Away	JDT	KDA	KDN	KLC	KUC	NSE	PDRM	PEN	PRK	SAB	SEL	SRP	TER
Johor Darul Ta'zim II		3–0	3–3	1–2	3–0	1–1	3–0	7–0	1–1	3–0	1–1	2–1	0–1
Kedah Darul Aman	0–1		0–2	0–3	1–0	0–2	0–1	1–0	0–3	2–1	1–1	2–3	2–0
Kelantan Darul Naim	0–5	2–3		0–0	2–0	2–1	0–0	3–2	1–0	2–1	2–1	1–2	0–5
Kuala Lumpur City	0–0	0–1	0–1		1–1	1–0	1–0	2–1	1–1	2–0	0–2	1–1	4–4
Kuching City	2–4	3–1	0–1	1–3		0–1	3–2	1–3	0–1	2–0	0–5	0–3	2–3
Negeri Sembilan	1–2	1–0	0–0	0–0	1–1		1–2	0–1	2–0	1–1	1–2	1–1	1–0
PDRM	0–1	1–1	3–2	1–3	3–2	0–1		2–1	0–0	7–1	1–0	0–1	0–1
Penang	0–4	1–1	4–1	2–1	2–0	1–0	1–1		0–2	2–2	3–4	2–4	2–2
Perak II	0–4	2–1	1–2	1–1	2–1	0–1	1–2	1–0		2–0	0–0	1–2	2–2
Sabah	0–1	1–4	4–1	2–1	1–1	3–1	5–2	2–2	2–3		2–3	1–2	1–2
Selangor	1–2	7–0	1–0	3–4	5–1	1–1	2–0	2–1	4–2	6–0		4–1	1–0
Sri Pahang	1–3	0–0	3–3	0–1	0–0	1–0	1–0	2–2	1–3	5–1	0–2		1–1
Terengganu II	1–0	4–1	4–0	0–0	3–0	0–0	4–0	4–1	0–0	3–0	0–2	2–2	

Updated to match(es) played on 14 April 2025. Source: MFL
Legend: Blue = home team win; Yellow = draw; Red = away team win.
For upcoming matches, an "a" indicates there is an article about the rivalry between the two participants.

=== Results by match played ===
Team ╲ Round	1	2	3	4	5	6	7	8	9	10	11	12	13	14	15	16	17	18	19	20	21	22	23	24	25	26
Johor Darul Ta'zim II	W	W	W	L	W	W	D	W	D	W	D	–	W	W	W	D	L	W	D	W	W	L	W	W	–	W
Kedah Darul Aman	L	D	L	L	–	W	W	L	L	D	L	L	D	W	W	W	W	–	L	W	L	D	L	L	L	L
Kelantan Darul Naim	W	D	W	W	W	W	D	–	W	L	D	L	D	W	W	L	L	W	L	W	–	L	L	L	D	L
Kuala Lumpur City	W	D	D	D	W	W	–	D	D	W	W	L	D	L	L	W	W	L	L	–	D	W	D	W	W	D
Kuching City	L	L	D	W	L	–	L	D	L	L	L	L	L	L	D	L	L	L	–	L	W	L	L	D	L	W
Negeri Sembilan	D	W	L	D	L	W	D	L	W	–	D	W	D	W	D	D	L	D	L	L	L	W	–	L	W	L
PDRM	W	L	W	–	L	L	L	D	L	D	L	W	W	D	L	L	–	L	W	L	W	W	W	L	D	L
Pulau Pinang	L	D	L	L	L	L	W	L	–	D	D	D	L	D	L	L	L	W	W	W	W	–	D	L	L	L
Perak II	L	W	–	W	D	L	D	D	L	D	W	W	D	L	W	–	W	D	W	L	L	L	L	W	W	D
Sabah	L	L	L	L	L	L	L	D	L	D	–	L	D	L	L	W	L	L	W	L	L	W	D	–	L	W
Selangor II	W	–	W	L	W	L	W	W	W	D	D	W	D	W	–	W	W	W	D	W	W	L	W	W	L	W
Sri Pahang	–	L	D	W	W	W	W	L	W	L	W	D	D	–	L	D	W	D	L	W	L	D	D	D	W	W
Terengganu II	D	W	D	W	D	L	L	D	W	W	D	W	–	L	W	D	W	D	W	L	D	W	W	W	W	–

Updated to match(es) played on 14 April 2025. Source: FAM-CMS
W = Win; D = Draw; L = Lose; P = Postponed

== Season statistics ==
=== Top goalscorers ===
As of 18 January 2025

Rank	Player	Club	Goals
1	(Malaysia) Gabriel Nistelrooy	Johor Darul Ta'zim II	19
2	(Nigeria) Chukwu Nnabuike	Terengganu II	10
3	(Malaysia) Afeeq Iqmal Rosli	Kedah Darul Aman	9
3	(Malaysia) Abdul Rahman Daud	Selangor II	9
3	(Malaysia) Asraff Aliffuddin Yasin	Kelantan Darul Naim	9
6	(Malaysia) Airil Zafran Azrul	Sri Pahang	5
6	(Malaysia) Alif Zikri Zaini Anuar	Perak II	5
6	(Malaysia) Fitri Aziq Wahid	Sri Pahang	5
6	(Malaysia) Lokman Bah Din	Sri Pahang	5

=== Hat-trick ===
Player	For	Against	Result	Date
(Malaysia) Gabriel Nistelrooy	Johor Darul Ta'zim II	Sabah	3–0 (H)	20 May 2024
(Nigeria) Chukwu Nnabuike Chijioke	Terengganu II	PDRM	4–0 (H)	28 May 2024
(Jordan) Reziq Bani Hani	Selangor II	Sabah	6–0 (H)	17 July 2024

Notes (H) – Home team (A) – Away team ^{4} – Player scored 4 goals
