= Alexander Amponsah =

Ghanaian association football player

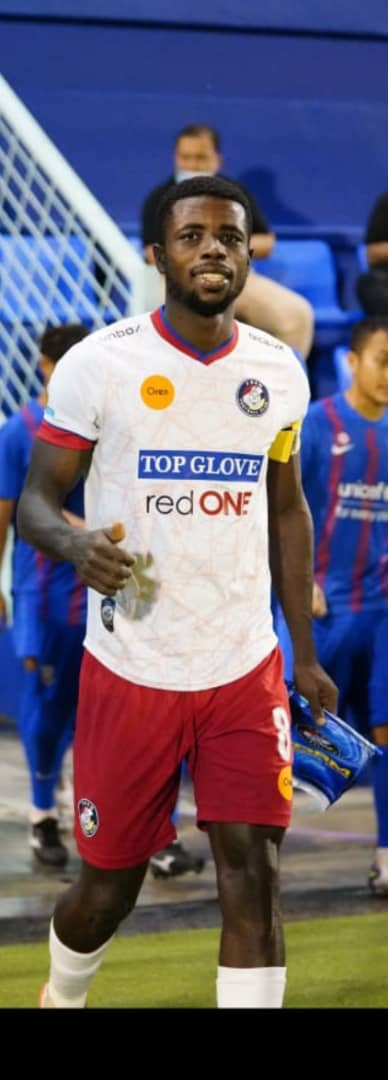

Personal information
- Full name: Alexander Amponsah
- Date of birth: 12 September 1997 (age 29)
- Place of birth: Accra, Ghana
- Height: 1.73 m (5 ft 8 in)
- Position: Defensive midfielder

Youth career
- 2011–2012: Sports Council FC
- 2012–2013: King Solomon FC
- 2013–2015: CFR CYPRUS FC

Senior career*
Years	Team	Apps	(Gls)
2015–2016	FC Uijeongbu	20	(4)
2017–2019	Ultimate F.C Ghana	33	(2)
2020–2021	Rakhine United F.C.	28	(5)
2021–2022	PDRM	34	(1)
- * Club domestic league appearances and goals as of 14 August 2022

Alexander Amponsah (born 12 September 1997) is a Ghanaian footballer who plays as a defensive midfielder.

== Career ==
Amponsah was playing in the lower divisions of Ghana's football pyramid for Sports Council FC and King Solomon FC. He later joined CRF Cyprus in 2013. He then was transferred to FC Uijeongbu in 2015 and Ultimate F.C. Ghana in 2017.

On 24 November 2020, Alexander Amponsah signed a two-year contract with Myanmar National League side Rakhine United.

On 7 February 2021, Amponsah officially signed a two-year contract with Malaysia Premier League club PDMR. He was assigned the number 8 jersey.
