= MFL Cup =

Football league in Malaysia

- Organising body: Malaysian Football League
- Founded: March 2023; 3 years ago
- Folded: April 2025
- Country: Malaysia
- Confederation: AFC
- Number of clubs: 15
- Last champions: Johor Darul Ta'zim II F.C. Terengganu II (1st title)
- Most championships: Johor Darul Ta'zim II F.C. Terengganu II (1 title)
- Top scorer: Ebenezer Assifuah (16)
- Broadcaster(s): MFL (YouTube); Astro
- Website: www.malaysianfootballleague.com

The MFL Cup (Malay: Piala MFL) was the reserve team football league for the Malaysia Super League members. It was organized by the Malaysian Football League (MFL). It was founded in 2023 as the only reserve team league under the Malaysian football league system.

Terengganu II are the inaugural champions of the MFL Cup, having beaten Johor Darul Ta'zim II 1–0 in the 2023 final. The MFL Cup was folded in March 2025 in line with the Malaysian Football League's move to reduce expenses. JDT II won the 2024–25 MFL Cup season over Selangor F.C. U-23 by one point.

== History ==
=== Beginnings ===
The first MFL Cup took place during the 2023 season, featuring fifteen teams. These teams were divided in group A consisting of eight teams, and Group B consisting of seven teams. Each team was drawn from the Central Zone, North, South, East, Borneo, and one State team. The inaugural match of the MFL Cup was held on March 2, where Johor Darul Ta'zim II secured a 1–0 victory over Penang at the Pasir Gudang Corporation Stadium. Although Aysar Hadi was the sole goalscorer in that match, he was not the first player to score in the MFL Cup. The honor went to Harith Najwan of the FAM-MSN Project in a match against PDRM. Terengganu II ultimately won the first MFL Cup by defeating Johor Darul Ta'zim II 1–0 in the final.

== Competition format ==
The Malaysian Football League (MFL) introduced another change involving the MFL Cup as the 2024–25 season featured a one-group league format, instead of the two-group format used in the 2023 MFL Cup season. The governing body explained that the league's format change was made after receiving a request from the participants and as the initiative to strengthen the under-23 group of players. The MFL has also allowed a quota of 5 over-age players, including 3 foreigners in each team. A maximum of three foreign players and two over-age players can play at the same time.

From	To	Teams	Match-weeks	Group format	Final
2023		15	21	Yes	Yes
2024–25		13	22	No	No

== Teams (2024) ==
Team	Position in 2023	First season	Titles	Last title
Johor Darul Ta'zim II	2nd	2023	0	—N/a
Kedah Darul Aman B	8th	2023	0	—N/a
Kelantan Darul Naim	15th	2023	0	—N/a
Kuala Lumpur City Extension	6th	2023	0	—N/a
Kuching City	12th	2023	0	—N/a
Negeri Sembilan	10th	2023	0	—N/a
PDRM	5th	2023	0	—N/a
Perak II	7th	2023	0	—N/a
Penang II	9th	2023	0	—N/a
Sabah II	11th	2023	0	—N/a
Selangor	4th	2023	0	—N/a
Sri Pahang	3rd	2023	0	—N/a
Terengganu II	1st	2023	1	2023

=== Other teams ===
Overview of MFL Cup former teams
Team	First season	Final season
FAM-MSN Project	2023	2023
Kelantan	2023	2023

== Stadiums and locations (2024) ==
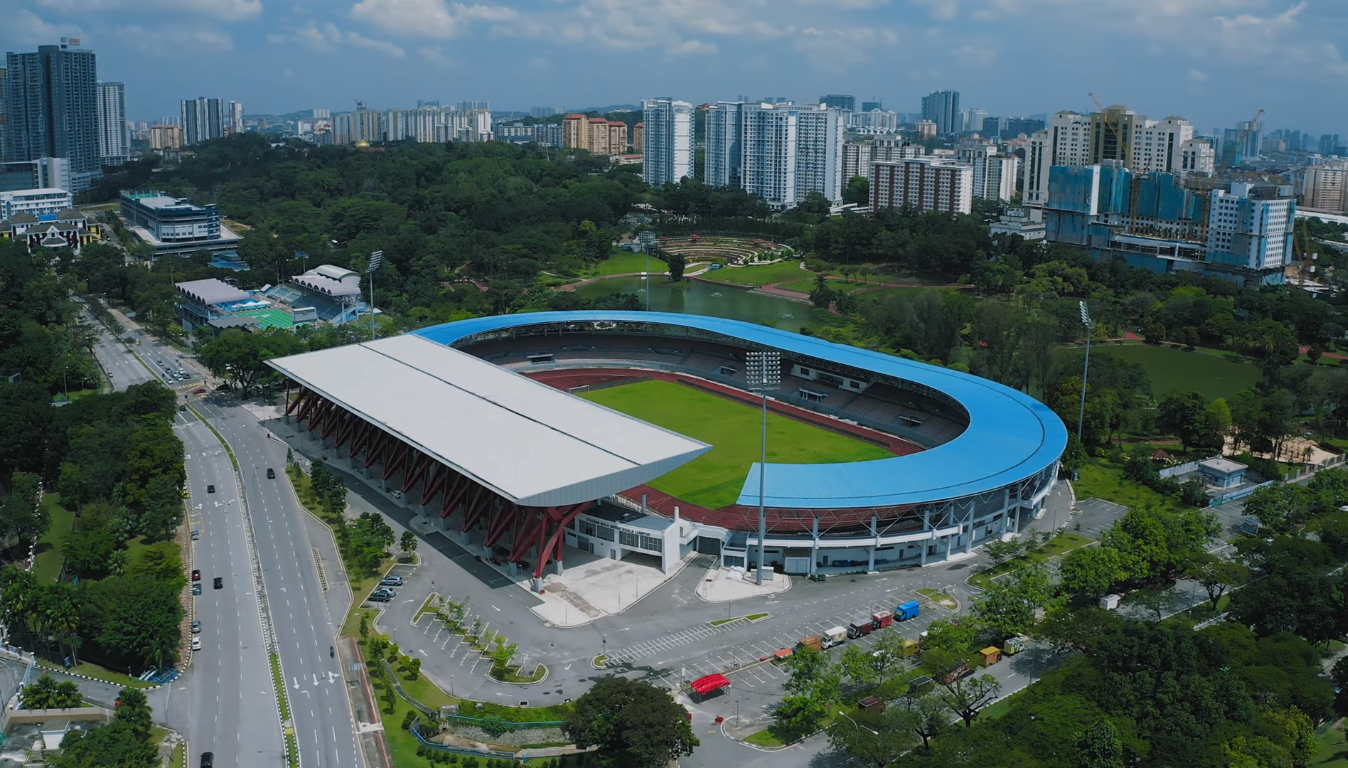
Kuala Lumpur Stadium

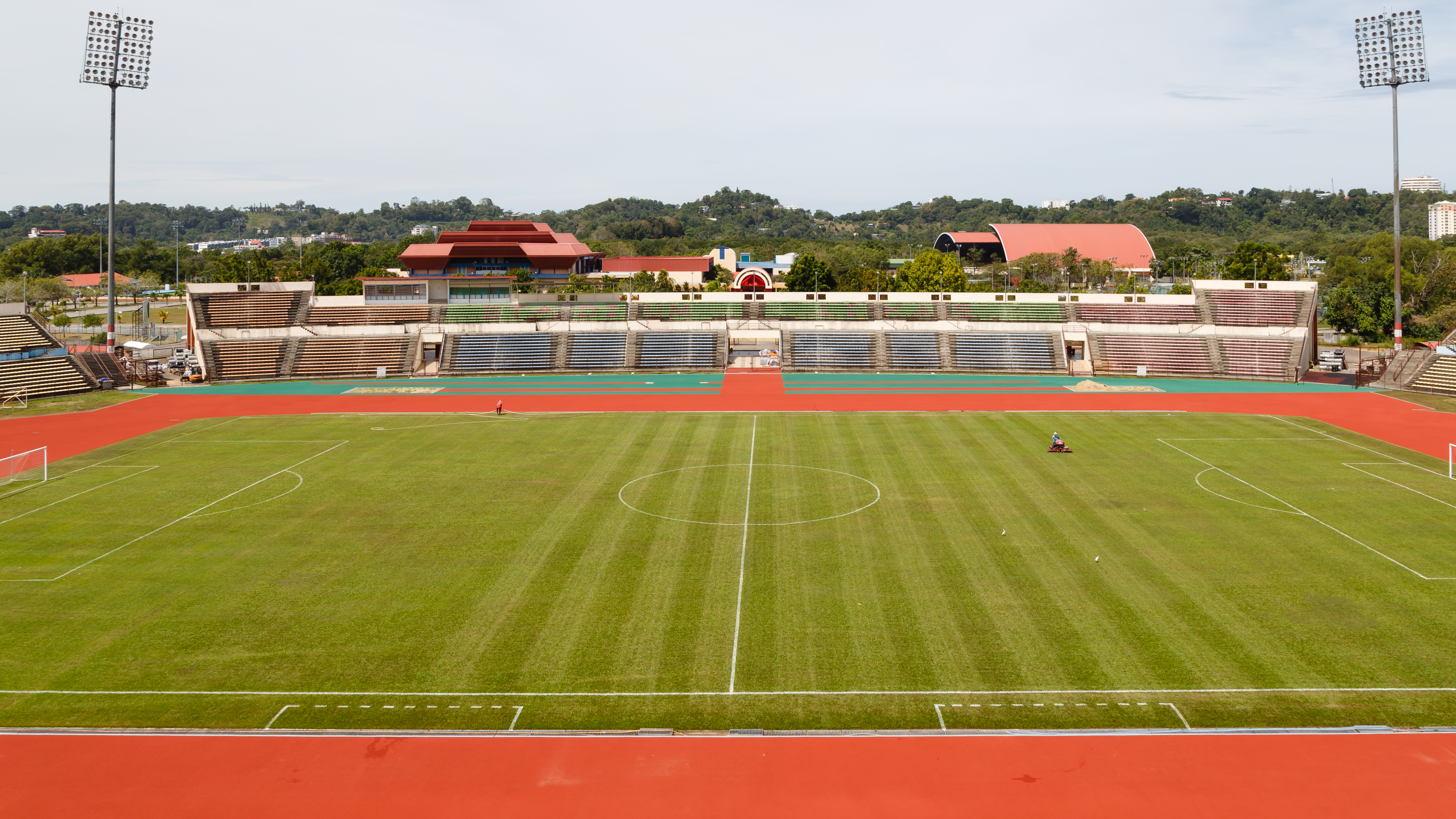
Likas Stadium

Team	Location	Stadium	Capacity
Johor Darul Ta'zim II	Pasir Gudang	Pasir Gudang Corporation Stadium	15,000
Kedah Darul Aman B	Alor Setar	Darul Aman Stadium	32,387
Kelantan Darul Naim	Kota Bharu	Sultan Muhammad IV Stadium	22,000
Kuala Lumpur City Extension	Kuala Lumpur	Kuala Lumpur Stadium	18,000
Kuching City	Kuching	Sarawak State Stadium	26,000
Negeri Sembilan	Tampin	Tampin Mini Stadium	3,000
PDRM	Selayang	Selayang Stadium	16,000
Perak II	Ipoh	Perak Stadium	42,500
Penang II	George Town	City Stadium	25,000
Sabah II	Kota Kinabalu	Likas Stadium	35,000
Selangor	Shah Alam	UiTM Stadium	10,000
Sri Pahang	Temerloh	Temerloh Mini Stadium	10,000
Terengganu II	Kuala Terengganu	Sultan Ismail Nasiruddin Shah Stadium	15,000

== Results ==
List of MFL Cup finals
Season	Winner	Score	Runner-up	Venue	Attendance	Ref.
2023	Terengganu II	1–0	Johor Darul Ta'zim II	Kuala Lumpur Stadium	3,055	
League match format
2024–25	Johor Darul Ta'zim II	RR	Selangor II			

== Performance by team ==
Team	Winners	Runners-up	Winning seasons	Runner-up seasons
Johor Darul Ta'zim II	1	1	2024–25	2023
Terengganu II	1	0	2023	—
Selangor II	0	1	—	2024–25

== Awards ==
=== Top scorers ===
Season	Player	Team	Goals
2023	(Ghana) Ebenezer Assifuah	Kedah Darul Aman B	16

=== Man of the match (final) ===
Season	Player	Team
2023	(Malaysia) Ubaidullah Shamsul	Terengganu II

== See also ==
- Malaysia Cup
- Malaysia FA Cup
- MFL Challenge Cup
- Piala Emas Raja-Raja
- Football in Malaysia
