= 2023 Johor Darul Ta'zim F.C. season =

Johor Darul Ta'zim
2023 season
- Chairman: Tunku Tun Aminah Sultan Ibrahim
- Head Coach: Esteban Solari
- Stadium: Sultan Ibrahim Stadium
- Super League: 1st
- Charity Shield: Winners
- FA Cup: Winners
- Malaysia Cup: Winners
- Champions League: Group stage
- Top goalscorer: League: Forestieri (19); All: Bérgson (32)
- Highest home attendance: 31,889 (vs Terengganu FC on 24 Feb 2023)
- Lowest home attendance: 10,833 (vs Kelantan United on 13 May 2023)
- Average home league attendance: 28,147
- Biggest win: 10–0 vs Kelantan (H), 19 August 2023, Malaysia Cup
- Biggest defeat: 0–5 vs Kawasaki Frontale (A), 29 November 2023, Champions League
| Home colours | Away colours |

The 2023 season is Johor Darul Ta'zim Football Club's 50th season in club history and 9th season in the Malaysia Super League after rebranding their name from Johor FC.

== Squad ==
=== Johor Darul Ta'zim F.C. ===
As of 05 January 2023.

| Squad No. | Name | Nationality | Date of birth (age) | Previous club | Contract since | Contract end |
Goalkeepers
| 1 | Farizal Marlias | (Malaysia) | 29 June 1986 (age 40) | (Malaysia) Selangor | 2015 | 2023 |
| 26 | Haziq Nadzli | (Malaysia) | 6 January 1998 (age 28) | (Malaysia) PDRM FC | 2017 | 2023 |
| 33 | Syihan Hazmi | (Malaysia) | 26 February 1996 (age 30) | (Malaysia) Negeri Sembilan FC | 2023 | |
Defenders
| 2 | Matthew Davies | (Malaysia) (Australia) | 7 February 1995 (age 31) | (Malaysia) Pahang | 2020 | 2023 |
| 3 | Adam Nor Azlin | (Malaysia) | 5 January 1996 (age 30) | (Malaysia) Selangor | 2018 | 2023 |
| 5 | Jordi Amat | (Indonesia) (Spain) | 21 March 1992 (age 34) | (Belgium) Eupen | 2022 | 2023 |
| 7 | Aidil Zafuan | (Malaysia) | 3 August 1987 (age 39) | (Malaysia) ATM FA | 2013 | 2023 |
| 12 | S. Kunanlan | (Malaysia) | 15 September 1986 (age 40) | (Malaysia) Selangor | 2015 | 2023 |
| 14 | Shane Lowry | (Australia) (Republic of Ireland) | 12 June 1989 (age 37) | (Qatar) Al Ahli | 2021 | 2023 |
| 15 | Feroz Baharudin | (Malaysia) | 2 April 2000 (age 26) | (Malaysia) Johor Darul Ta'zim II | 2021 | 2023 |
| 22 | La'Vere Corbin-Ong | (Malaysia) (Canada) | 21 April 1991 (age 35) | (Netherlands) Go Ahead Eagles | 2018 | 2023 |
| 32 | Shahrul Saad | (Malaysia) | 8 July 1993 (age 33) | (Malaysia) Perak | 2021 | 2023 |
| 91 | Syahmi Safari | (Malaysia) | 5 February 1998 (age 28) | (Malaysia) Selangor | 2022 | 2023 |
Midfielders
| 4 | Afiq Fazail | (Malaysia) | 29 September 1994 (age 32) | (Malaysia) Harimau Muda B | 2015 | 2023 |
| 6 | Nathaniel Shio Hong Wan | (Malaysia) (England) | 17 August 2000 (age 26) | (England) Wolves U23 | 2021 | 2023 |
| 8 | Safiq Rahim | (Malaysia) | 5 July 1987 (age 39) | (Malaysia) Melaka United | 2021 | 2023 |
| 10 | Leandro Velázquez | (Argentina) | 10 May 1989 (age 37) | (Colombia) Rionegro Águilas | 2019 | 2023 |
| 13 | Mohamadou Sumareh | (Malaysia) (The Gambia) | 20 September 1994 (age 32) | (Thailand) Police Tero | 2021 | 2023 |
| 16 | Danial Amier Norhisham | (Malaysia) | 27 March 1997 (age 29) | (Malaysia) FELDA United | 2021 | 2023 |
| 21 | Nazmi Faiz | (Malaysia) | 16 August 1994 (age 32) | (Malaysia) Johor Darul Ta'zim II | 2017 | 2023 |
| 23 | Endrick | (Malaysia) (Brazil) | 7 March 1995 (age 31) | (Malaysia) Penang | 2022 | 2023 |
| 30 | Natxo Insa | (Malaysia) (Spain) | 9 June 1986 (age 40) | (Spain) Levante UD | 2017 | 2023 |
| 41 | Aysar Hadi | (Malaysia) | 4 September 2003 (age 23) | (Malaysia) Johor Darul Ta'zim II | 2021 | 2023 |
| 77 | Syamer Kutty Abba | (Malaysia) | 1 October 1997 (age 29) | (Portugal) Vilaverdense | 2018 | 2023 |
| 81 | Daryl Sham | (Malaysia) (Philippines) | 30 November 2002 (age 23) | (Malaysia) Johor Darul Ta'zim II | 2022 | 2023 |
| 88 | Takahiro Kunimoto | (Japan) | 8 October 1997 (age 29) | (Portugal) Casa Pia | 2023 | 2023 |
Strikers
| 9 | Bergson da Silva | (Brazil) | 9 February 1991 (age 35) | (Brazil) Fortaleza | 2021 | 2023 |
| 11 | Diogo | (Brazil) | 26 May 1987 (age 39) | (Thailand) BG Pathum United F.C. | 2023 | 2023 |
| 17 | Ramadhan Saifullah | (Malaysia) | 9 December 2000 (age 25) | (Malaysia) Johor Darul Ta'zim III | 2020 | 2023 |
| 18 | Hazwan Bakri | (Malaysia) | 19 June 1991 (age 35) | (Malaysia) Selangor | 2017 | 2023 |
| 19 | Akhyar Rashid | (Malaysia) | 1 May 1999 (age 27) | (Malaysia) Kedah | 2019 | 2023 |
| 20 | Juan Muñiz | (Spain) | 14 March 1992 (age 34) | (Greece) Atromitos | 2023 | 2023 |
| 24 | Óscar Arribas | (Philippines) (Spain) | 20 October 1998 (age 28) | (Spain) FC Cartagena (S2) | 2023 | 2023 |
| 28 | Syafiq Ahmad | (Malaysia) | 28 June 1995 (age 31) | (Malaysia) Kedah | 2018 | 2023 |
| 29 | Safawi Rasid | (Malaysia) | 5 March 1997 (age 29) | (Thailand) Ratchaburi F.C. | 2017 | 2023 |
| 37 | Heberty | (Brazil) | 29 August 1988 (age 38) | (Thailand) Bangkok United F.C. | 2023 | 2023 |
| 42 | Arif Aiman Hanapi | (Malaysia) | 4 May 2002 (age 24) | (Malaysia) Johor Darul Ta'zim III | 2020 | 2023 |
| 45 | Fernando Forestieri | (Argentina) (Italy) | 15 January 1990 (age 36) | (Italy) Udinese | 2022 | 2023 |
| 92 | Lévy Madinda | (Gabon) | 22 June 1992 (age 34) | (Indonesia) Persib Bandung | 2022 | 2023 |
On loan
| 6 | Syazwan Andik | (Malaysia) | 4 August 1996 (age 30) | (Malaysia) Melaka United | 2019 | |
| 20 | Azrif Nasrulhaq | (Malaysia) | 27 May 1991 (age 35) | (Malaysia) Selangor | 2016 | 2022 |
| 24 | Izham Tarmizi | (Malaysia) | 24 April 1991 (age 35) | (Malaysia) Harimau Muda A | 2014 | 2022 |
| 25 | Moussa Sidibe | (Mali) (Spain) | 21 November 1994 (age 31) | (Spain) Costa Brava | 2022 | 2023 |
| 33 | Daniel Ting | (Malaysia) (England) | 1 December 1992 (age 33) | (Malaysia) Kuala Lumpur City | 2022 | 2022 |
| 38 | Junior Eldstål | (Malaysia) (England) (Sweden) | 16 September 1991 (age 35) | (Thailand) Chonburi | 2022 | |
| 88 | Liridon Krasniqi | (Malaysia) (Kosovo) | 1 January 1992 (age 34) | (India) Odisha | 2020 | 2022 |
Left during the season
| 23 | Carli de Murga | (Philippines) (Spain) | 30 November 1988 (age 37) | (Malaysia) Terengganu I | 2022 | |
| 99 | Jonathan Herrera | (Argentina) | 16 September 1991 (age 35) | (Argentina) Patronato | 2021 | 2023 |

=== Johor Darul Ta'zim II F.C. ===
As of 21 October 2020.

| Squad no. | Name | Nationality | Date of birth (age) | Previous club | Contract since | Contract end |
Goalkeepers
| 1 | Zulhilmi Sharani | (Malaysia) | 4 May 2004 (age 22) | (Malaysia) Johor Darul Ta'zim III F.C. | 2019 | |
| 22 | Riezman Irfan | (Malaysia) | | (Malaysia) Johor Darul Ta'zim III F.C. | 2021 | |
| 25 | Hafiz Azizi | (Malaysia) | 5 August 2001 (age 25) | (Malaysia) Johor Darul Ta'zim III F.C. | 2019 | |
| 35 | Harith Bisyar | (Malaysia) | | (Malaysia) Johor Darul Ta'zim III F.C. | 2021 | |
| 98 | Haziq Nadzli | (Malaysia) | 6 January 1998 (age 28) | (Malaysia) Johor Darul Ta'zim F.C. | 2017 | 2023 |
Defenders
| 2 | Nafizuddin Fauzi | (Malaysia) | 16 February 2001 (age 25) | (Malaysia) Johor Darul Ta'zim III F.C. | 2021 | |
| 3 | Firdaus Ramli | (Malaysia) | 10 March 2002 (age 24) | (Malaysia) Johor Darul Ta'zim III F.C. | 2021 | |
| 4 | Ali Imran | (Malaysia) | 30 May 2002 (age 24) | (Malaysia) Johor Darul Ta'zim III F.C. | 2021 | |
| 5 | Syahirul Fazly | (Malaysia) | 20 February 2001 (age 25) | (Malaysia) Johor Darul Ta'zim III F.C. | 2021 | |
| 15 | Adam Daniel | (Malaysia) | | (Malaysia) Johor Darul Ta'zim III F.C. | 2021 | |
| 16 | Ahmad Irfan | (Malaysia) | | (Malaysia) Johor Darul Ta'zim III F.C. | 2021 | |
| 21 | Marwan Abdul Rahman | (Malaysia) | 2 January 2003 (age 23) | (Malaysia) Johor Darul Ta'zim III F.C. | 2021 | |
| 23 | Fergus Tierney | (Malaysia) (Scotland) | 19 March 2003 (age 23) | (Malaysia) Johor Darul Ta'zim III F.C. | 2020 | |
| 24 | Naqiu Aiman | (Malaysia) | | (Malaysia) Johor Darul Ta'zim III F.C. | 2020 | |
| 26 | Umar Hakeem | (Malaysia) | 26 August 2002 (age 24) | (Malaysia) Johor Darul Ta'zim III F.C. | 2020 | |
| 27 | Fakrul Haikal | (Malaysia) | | (Malaysia) Johor Darul Ta'zim III F.C. | 2020 | |
| 28 | Adam Farhan | (Malaysia) | 4 March 2004 (age 22) | (Malaysia) Johor Darul Ta'zim III F.C. | 2020 | |
| 41 | Shane Lowry | (Australia) (Republic of Ireland) | 12 June 1989 (age 37) | (Malaysia) Johor Darul Ta'zim F.C. | 2021 | 2023 |
| 51 | Feroz Baharudin | (Malaysia) | 2 April 2000 (age 26) | (Malaysia) Johor Darul Ta'zim F.C. | 2021 | |
| 99 | Adam Nor Azlin | (Malaysia) | 5 January 1996 (age 30) | (Malaysia) Johor Darul Ta'zim F.C. | 2018 | |
Midfielders
| 6 | Rafiefikri Rosman | (Malaysia) | 13 June 2002 (age 24) | (Malaysia) Johor Darul Ta'zim III F.C. | 2020 | |
| 7 | Najmuddin Akmal | (Malaysia) | 11 January 2003 (age 23) | (Malaysia) Johor Darul Ta'zim III F.C. | 2022 | |
| 8 | Nizarruddin Jazi | (Malaysia) | 12 February 2000 (age 26) | (Malaysia) UiTM F.C. | 2023 | |
| 10 | Aiman Danish Azli | (Malaysia) | 7 March 2003 (age 23) | (Malaysia) Johor Darul Ta'zim III F.C. | 2021 | |
| 11 | Alif Mutalib | (Malaysia) | 16 January 2002 (age 24) | (Malaysia) Johor Darul Ta'zim III F.C. | 2020 | |
| 12 | Ziad El Basheer | (Malaysia) | 24 December 2003 (age 22) | (Malaysia) Johor Darul Ta'zim III F.C. | 2021 | |
| 13 | Aysar Hadi | (Malaysia) | 4 September 2003 (age 23) | (Malaysia) Johor Darul Ta'zim III F.C. | 2021 | |
| 14 | Chia Rou Han | (Malaysia) | 1 September 2001 (age 25) | (Malaysia) Johor Darul Ta'zim III F.C. | 2021 | |
| 18 | Daryl Sham | (Malaysia) | 30 November 2002 (age 23) | (Malaysia) Johor Darul Ta'zim III F.C. | 2022 | |
| 19 | Aznil Hafiz | (Malaysia) | | (Malaysia) Johor Darul Ta'zim III F.C. | 2021 | |
| 20 | Harif Mustaqim Hamdan | (Malaysia) | | (Malaysia) Johor Darul Ta'zim III F.C. | 2021 | |
| 29 | Syukur Fariz | (Malaysia) | 1 May 2003 (age 23) | (Malaysia) Johor Darul Ta'zim III F.C. | 2021 | |
| 30 | Danish Hakimi | (Malaysia) | | (Malaysia) Johor Darul Ta'zim III F.C. | 2021 | |
| 31 | Mohamadou Sumareh | (Malaysia) (The Gambia) | 20 September 1994 (age 32) | (Malaysia) Johor Darul Ta'zim F.C. | 2021 | 2023 |
| 47 | Ramadhan Saifullah | (Malaysia) | 9 December 2000 (age 25) | (Malaysia) Johor Darul Ta'zim F.C. | 2020 | 2023 |
| 66 | Danial Amier Norhisham | (Malaysia) | 27 March 1997 (age 29) | (Malaysia) Johor Darul Ta'zim F.C. | 2021 | 2023 |
Forwards
| 9 | Gabriel Nistelrooy | (Malaysia) | 25 April 2000 (age 26) | (Malaysia) Johor Darul Ta'zim III F.C. | 2021 | |
| 17 | Danie Asyraf | (Malaysia) | | (Malaysia) Johor Darul Ta'zim III F.C. | 2021 | |
| 24 | Óscar Arribas | (Philippines) (Spain) | 20 October 1998 (age 28) | (Malaysia) Johor Darul Ta'zim F.C. | 2023 | 2023 |
| 68 | Hazwan Bakri | (Malaysia) | 19 June 1991 (age 35) | (Malaysia) Johor Darul Ta'zim F.C. | 2017 | 2021 |
| ?? | Awang Muhammad Faiz Hazziq | (Malaysia) | 6 March 1999 (age 27) | (Malaysia) Johor Darul Ta'zim III F.C. | 2020 | |
Players who are loan to other clubs
Players who had left other clubs during the season

== Transfers and contracts ==
=== In ===
Preseason

| Position | Player | Transferred from | Ref |
|---|---|---|---|
| GK | (Malaysia) Syihan Hazmi | (Malaysia) Negeri Sembilan FC | Free |
| FW | (Spain) Juan Muñiz | (Greece) Atromitos | Free |
| FW | (Philippines) (Spain) Óscar Arribas | (Spain) FC Cartagena | Free |
| FW | (Brazil) Diogo | (Thailand) BG Pathum United | Free |

Mid-season

| Position | Player | Transferred from | Ref |
|---|---|---|---|
| FW | (Brazil) Heberty | (Thailand) Bangkok United | Season loan |
| MF | (Japan) Takahiro Kunimoto | (Portugal) Casa Pia | Free |
| MF | (Argentina) (Syria) Jalil Elías | (Argentina) San Lorenzo | Free; Joining Jan 2024 |
| FW | (Malaysia) (Colombia) Romel Morales | (Malaysia) Kuala Lumpur City | Free; Joining Jan 2024 |
| DF | (Malaysia) Azam Azmi | (Malaysia) Terengganu FC | Undisclosed; Joining Jan 2024 |

=== Loan In / Return ===
Preseason

| Position | Player | Transferred from | Ref |
|---|---|---|---|
| DF | (Malaysia) Che Rashid | (Malaysia) Negeri Sembilan FC | Loan Return |
| DF | (Malaysia) Fadhli Shas | (Malaysia) Melaka United | Loan Return |
| DF | (Malaysia) Syazwan Andik | (Malaysia) Melaka United | Loan Return |
| MF | (Malaysia) Irfan Fazail | (Malaysia) Sabah (Note: Rejoin Sabah permanently after his contract end) | Loan Return |
| MF | (Malaysia) (England) Stuart Wilkin | (Malaysia) Sabah (Note: Rejoin Sabah permanently after his contract end) | Loan Return |
| MF | (Brazil) Endrick | (Malaysia) Penang | Loan Return |
| FW | (Argentina) Jonathan Herrera | (Argentina) Club Atlético Patronato (Note: Left JDT after end of loan to join Ferro Carril Oeste) | Loan Return |

Mid-season

| Position | Player | Transferred from | Ref |
|---|---|---|---|
| MF | (Malaysia) (Kosovo) Liridon Krasniqi | (Thailand) Khon Kaen United | Loan Return |
| MF | (Malaysia) (England) . Junior Eldstål | (Thailand) PT Prachuap (T1) | Loan Return (Note: Left JDT on loan again to Dewa United in Indonesia) |
| FW | (Mali) (Spain) Moussa Sidibé | (Thailand) Ratchaburi | Loan Return (Note: Left JDT on loan again to Persis in Indonesia) |
| FW | (Malaysia) Safawi Rasid | (Thailand) Ratchaburi | Loan Return |
| FW | (Gabon) Lévy Madinda | (Malaysia) Negeri Sembilan FC | Loan Return |
| FW | (Gabon) Lévy Madinda | (Indonesia) Persib Bandung | Loan Return |

=== Out ===
Preseason

| Position | Player | Transferred To | Ref |
|---|---|---|---|
| GK | (Malaysia) T. Shaheeswaran | (Malaysia) Negeri Sembilan FC | Free |
| GK | (Malaysia) Rozaimi Rahamat | (Malaysia) Kelantan FC | Free |
| DF | (Philippines) (Spain) Carli de Murga | (Malaysia) Kelantan FC | Free |
| DF | (Malaysia) Hafiy Haikal | (Malaysia) Kelantan United F.C. | Free |
| DF | (Malaysia) Fadhli Shas | (Malaysia) Sri Pahang FC | Free. Signed for 2 years till 2024 |
| MF | (Malaysia) Danial Haqim | (Malaysia) Sabah | Free |
| MF | (Malaysia) Firdaus Kaironnisam | (Malaysia) Sabah | Free |
| MF | (Malaysia) Irfan Fazail | (Malaysia) Sabah (Note: Rejoin Sabah permanently after his contract end) | Free |
| MF | (Malaysia) (England) Stuart Wilkin | (Malaysia) Sabah (Note: Rejoin Sabah permanently after his contract end) | Free. Signed for 2 years till 2024 |
| MF | (Malaysia) Amirul Husaini Zamri | (Malaysia) Perak F.C. | Free |
| FW | (Argentina) Jonathan Herrera | (Argentina) Ferro Carril Oeste (A2) | Free |
| FW | (Malaysia) (Brazil) Guilherme de Paula | (Malaysia) Melaka FC (M3) | Free |

=== Loan Out ===
Preseason

| Position | Player | Transferred To | Ref |
|---|---|---|---|
| GK | (Malaysia) Izham Tarmizi | (Malaysia) Sri Pahang FC | Season loan |
| DF | (Malaysia) Syazwan Andik | (Malaysia) Sri Pahang FC | Season loan |
| DF | (Malaysia) Azrif Nasrulhaq | (Malaysia) Sri Pahang FC | Season loan |
| DF | (Malaysia) (England) Daniel Ting | (Malaysia) Sabah | Season loan |
| MF | (Malaysia) (Kosovo) Liridon Krasniqi | (Thailand) Khon Kaen United | Season loan till May 2023 (Note: Liridon Krasniqi loan with Khon Kaen is cancelled prematurely) |
| FW | (Mali) (Spain) Moussa Sidibé | (Thailand) Ratchaburi | Season loan till May 2023 |
| FW | (Malaysia) Safawi Rasid | (Thailand) Ratchaburi | Season loan till May 2023 |
| MF | (Malaysia) (Kosovo) Liridon Krasniqi | (Malaysia) Terengganu FC | Season loan |
| MF | (Malaysia) (England) . Junior Eldstål | (Thailand) PT Prachuap (T1) | Season loan till May 2023 |
| FW | (Gabon) Lévy Madinda | (Malaysia) Negeri Sembilan FC | Season loan |

Mid-season

| Position | Player | Transferred To | Ref |
|---|---|---|---|
| FW | (Gabon) Lévy Madinda | (Indonesia) Persib Bandung | Season loan |
| FW | (Mali) (Spain) Moussa Sidibé | (Indonesia) Persis Solo | Season loan |
| MF | (Malaysia) (Kosovo) Liridon Krasniqi | (Malaysia) Terengganu FC | Season loan till December 2023 |
| MF | (Malaysia) (England) . Junior Eldstål | (Thailand) Dewa United (I1) | Season loan till May 2024 |

=== Retained ===
| Position | Player | Ref |
|---|---|---|
| DF | (Australia) (Republic of Ireland) Shane Lowry | 2 years contract signed in 2021 till 2023 |
| FW | (Argentina) (Italy) Fernando Forestieri | 2 years contract signed in 2022 till 2023 |
| GK | (Malaysia) Farizal Marlias | 1-year extension in 2022 till 2023 |
| DF | (Malaysia) Aidil Zafuan | 1-year extension in 2022 till 2023 |
| MF | (Malaysia) Safiq Rahim | 1-year extension in 2022 till 2023 |
| DF | (Malaysia) Feroz Baharudin | Promoted from JDT II |
| DF | (Malaysia) (Philippines) Daryl Sham | Promoted from JDT II |
| MF | (Malaysia) Adam Farhan | Promoted from JDT II |

== Friendly matches ==
Win Draw Loss

=== Tour of UAE ===
| 25 January 2023 1 | Rostov (Russia) | 2–0 | (Malaysia) Johor Darul Ta'zim | Dubai, United Arab Emirates |
| | Egor Golenkov 6', 20' |

| 28 January 2023 2 | Levski Sofia (Bulgaria) | 0–1 | (Malaysia) Johor Darul Ta'zim | Dubai, United Arab Emirates |
| | | | Juan Muñiz 23' |

| 31 January 2023 3 | Fursan Hispania FC (United Arab Emirates) | 0–3 | (Malaysia) Johor Darul Ta'zim | Dubai, United Arab Emirates |
| | | | | Stadium: The Sevens Stadium |

| 2 February 2023 4 | Lokomotiv Moscow (Russia) | 0–1 | (Malaysia) Johor Darul Ta'zim | Dubai, United Arab Emirates |
| | | | Arif Aiman 56' |

| 6 February 2023 5 | Zenit St Petersburg (Russia) | 3–0 | (Malaysia) Johor Darul Ta'zim | Dubai, United Arab Emirates |
| | Rodrigão 12'; Malcom 16'; Danil Krugovoy 32' |

=== Others ===
| 17 February 2023 6 | Johor Darul Ta'zim (Malaysia) | 4–0 | (Singapore) Lion City Sailors | Johor |
| | | | | Stadium: Sultan Ibrahim Stadium |

| 17 June 2023 7 | Johor Darul Ta'zim (Malaysia) | 5–1 | (Japan) Albirex Niigata (S) | Johor |
| | Diogo 18'; Fernando Forestieri 27'; Nazmi Faiz 53'; Bergson 64'; Aysar Hadi 67' | | Seia Kunori 63' | Stadium: Sultan Ibrahim Stadium |

== Competitions (JDT) ==
=== Overview ===
| Competition | First match | Last match | Starting round | Final position | Record | | | | | | | |
| Competition | First match | Last match | Starting round | Final position | Pld | W | D | L | GF | GA | GD | Win % |
|---|---|---|---|---|---|---|---|---|---|---|---|---|
| Malaysia Super League (Note: Includes the Charity Shield.) | 24 February 2023 | 17 December 2023 | Matchday 1 | Winners | 26 | 25 | 1 | 0 | 100 | 7 | +93 | 96.15 |
| Malaysia FA Cup | 14 April 2023 | 22 July 2023 | Second round | Winners | 4 | 4 | 0 | 0 | 14 | 0 | +14 | 100.00 |
| Malaysia Cup | 4 August 2023 | 8 December 2023 | Round of 16 | Winners | 7 | 7 | 0 | 0 | 37 | 5 | +32 | 100.00 |
| AFC Champions League | 19 September 2023 | 13 December 2023 | Group stage | Group stage | 6 | 3 | 0 | 3 | 11 | 13 | −2 | 50.00 |
| Total | | | | | 43 | 39 | 1 | 3 | 162 | 25 | +137 | 90.70 |

Last updated: 17 December 2023
Source: Competitions

=== Malaysia Super League ===
Win Draw Loss

| 24 February 2023 1 | Johor Darul Ta'zim | 2–0 | Terengganu | Johor |
| 21:00 MYT | Juan Muñiz 5'; Bergson Da Silva 58'; Óscar Arribas (yellow card) 68' | Report | Ivan Mamut (yellow card) 62' | Stadium: Sultan Ibrahim Stadium; Attendance: 31,889; Referee: Suhaizi Bin Shukri |

| 1 March 2023 2 | Kuala Lumpur City | 0–3 | Johor Darul Ta'zim | Kuala Lumpur |
| 20:15 MYT | Sebastian Avanzini (yellow card) 48'; Kenny Pallraj (yellow card) 67'; Haqimi Azim Rosli (yellow card) 82' | Report | Óscar Arribas (yellow card) 21'; Romel Morales 41' (o.g.); Endrick Dos Santos 51' (yellow card) 57'; Leandro Velazquez (yellow card) 77'; Arif Aiman Hanapi 90' | Stadium: Kuala Lumpur Stadium; Attendance: 6,847; Referee: Mohd Fusser Bin Mad Sallih |

| 6 March 2023 3 | Negeri Sembilan | 0–7 | Johor Darul Ta'zim | Paroi |
| 21:00 MYT | Zainal Abidin Jamil (yellow card) 12'; Che Rashid Che Halim (yellow card) 20'; Aroon Kumar (yellow card) 84' | Report | Fernando Forestieri 20', 47' (pen.); Diogo Luis Santo 41'; Arif Aiman Hanapi (yellow card) 35' (goal) 53'; La'Vere Corbin-Ong 67', 88'; Endrick Dos Santos 72' | Stadium: Tuanku Abdul Rahman Stadium; Attendance: 15,427; Referee: Razlan Bin Joffri Ali |

| 11 March 2023 4 | Johor Darul Ta'zim | 5–1 | Kelantan | Johor |
| 17:30 MYT | Diogo Luis Santo 3'; Endrick Dos Santos 26'; Fernando Forestieri 35'; Juan Muñiz 56'; Arif Aiman Hanapi 82' (pen.) | Report | Mario Arqués (yellow card) 29'; Leonardo Rolón 69' (pen.) | Stadium: Sultan Ibrahim Stadium; Attendance: 24,404; Referee: Muhammad Khairulsyahmi Bin Ahmad Khalidi |

| 17 March 2023 5 | Selangor | 0–4 | Johor Darul Ta'zim | Petaling Jaya |
| 21:00 MYT | Sharul Nazeem (yellow card) 23'; Zikri Khalili (yellow card) 26'; Yazan Al-Arab (yellow card) 40' | Report | Arif Aiman Hanapi (yellow card) 45'; Matthew Davies (yellow card) 52'; Juan Muñiz 55'; Diogo Luis Santo 66'; Fernando Forestieri 77', 82' | Stadium: MBPJ Stadium; Attendance: 14,462; Referee: Mohd Hasrol Bin Mohd Amir |

| 31 March 2023 6 | Johor Darul Ta'zim | 4–0 | Sabah | Johor |
| 22:00 MYT | Matthew Davies (yellow card) 19'; Arif Aiman Hanapi 20'; Juan Muñiz 39'; Syahmi Safari 81'; Fernando Forestieri 89' | Report | Park Tae-Soo (yellow card) 42' | Stadium: Sultan Ibrahim Stadium; Attendance: 19,836; Referee: Muhammad Nazmi Bin Nasaruddin |

| 4 April 2023 7 | Perak | 0–5 | Johor Darul Ta'zim | Ipoh |
| 22:00 MYT | Hadi Fayyadh (yellow card) 38'; Christian Obiozor (yellow card) 77' | Report | Hasnul Zaim 5' (o.g.); Leandro Velazquez 25', 90+2'; Diogo Luis Santo 45'; Bergson Da Silva 66'; Hong Wan (yellow card) 70' | Stadium: Perak Stadium; Attendance: 6,799; Referee: S. Logeswaran |

| 9 April 2023 8 | Johor Darul Ta'zim | 6–0 | Kedah Darul Aman | Johor |
| 22:00 MYT | Fernando Forestieri 23' (yellow card) 45'; Feroz Baharudin 48'; Óscar Arribas 50'; Bergson Da Silva 53' (pen.); Arif Aiman Hanapi 77'; Leandro Velazquez 86' | Report | Manuel Ott (yellow card) 15' | Stadium: Sultan Ibrahim Stadium; Attendance: 13,722; Referee: Razlan Bin Joffri Ali |

| 19 April 2023 9 | PDRM | 0–1 | Johor Darul Ta'zim | Petaling Jaya |
| 22:00 MYT | Kyaw Min Oo (yellow card) 73' (yellow-red card) 74' | Report | Fernando Forestieri 61' | Stadium: Petaling Jaya Stadium; Attendance: 1,705; Referee: Fitri Bin Maskon |

| 13 May 2023 10 | Johor Darul Ta'zim | 6–0 | Kelantan United | Johor |
| 20:15 MYT | Bergson 8', 61', 69'; Fernando Forestieri 22', 90+2'; Endrick Dos Santos (yellow card) 43'; Leandro Velázquez 76' | Report | Sharvin Selvakumaran (yellow card) 21' | Stadium: Sultan Ibrahim Stadium; Attendance: 10,833; Referee: Ahmad Zuhadi Bin Dzulkifli |

| 19 May 2023 11 | Kuching City | 0–4 | Johor Darul Ta'zim | Kuching |
| 20:15 MYT | Aylton Alemão (yellow card) 5'; Diego Baggio (yellow card) 84' | Report | Fernando Forestieri 4', 36'; Endrick Dos Santos (yellow card) 49'; Bergson Da Silva 70'; Juan Muñiz 73' | Stadium: Sarawak State Stadium; Attendance: 7,690; Referee: Mohamad Kamil Zakaria Bin Ismail |

| 24 May 2023 12 | Johor Darul Ta'zim | 2–0 | Sri Pahang | Johor |
| 20:15 MYT | Bergson Da Silva 45+1'; Leandro Velazquez (yellow card) 72'; Fernando Forestieri 74' | Report | Nicholas Swirad (yellow card) 22'; David Rowley (yellow card) 42' | Stadium: Sultan Ibrahim Stadium; Attendance: 14,684; Referee: Suhaizi Bin Shukri |

| 3 June 2023 13 | Penang | 0–2 | Johor Darul Ta'zim | George Town |
| 21:00 MYT | Zahril Azri (yellow card) 8'; Rafael Vitor (yellow card) 45+1'; Namathevan Arunasalam (yellow card) 81'; Azmeer Aris (yellow card) 84' | Report | Leandro Velazquez (yellow card) 17'; La'Vere Corbin-Ong 18'; Afiq Fazail (yellow card) 45'; Bergson Da Silva (yellow card) 45+2'; Hong Wan (yellow card) 78'; Fernando Forestieri 85'; Juan Muñiz (yellow card) 87' | Stadium: City Stadium; Attendance: 6,051; Referee: Suhaizi Bin Shukri |

| 9 June 2023 14 | Terengganu | 1–3 | Johor Darul Ta'zim | Terengganu |
| 21:00 MYT | Sony Nordé 28'; Argzim Redžović (yellow card) 45+1' (yellow-red card) 52'; Ivan Mamut (red card) 74' | Report | Fernando Forestieri 21'; Afiq Fazail (yellow card) 34'; Bergson Da Silva 45+3' (pen.); Endrick Dos Santos 90+5' | Stadium: Sultan Mizan Zainal Abidin Stadium; Attendance: 10,819; Referee: Mohd Fusser Bin Mad Sallih |

| 3 July 2023 15 | Johor Darul Ta'zim | 6–1 | Kuala Lumpur City | Johor |
| 21:00 MYT | Leandro Velazquez (yellow card) 28'; Diogo Luis Santo; Arif Aiman Hanapi 13'; Safiq Rahim 86'; Shane Lowry (yellow card) 66'; Akhyar Rashid 88' | Report | Matko Zirdum 54'; Akram Mahinan (yellow card) 66' | Stadium: Sultan Ibrahim Stadium; Attendance: 11,961; Referee: S. Logeswaran |

| 8 July 2023 16 | Johor Darul Ta'zim | 2–0 | Negeri Sembilan | Johor |
| 21:00 MYT | Feroz Baharudin 21'; Leandro Velazquez 44'; Fernando Forestieri (yellow card) 61'; Arif Aiman Hanapi (yellow card) 90+3' | Report | Herold Goulon (yellow card) 65' | Stadium: Sultan Ibrahim Stadium; Attendance: 13,344; Referee: Mohd Fusser Bin Mad Sallih |

| 14 July 2023 17 | Kelantan | 0–5 | Johor Darul Ta'zim | Kota Bharu |
| 21:00 MYT | Ghaffar Rahman (yellow card) 25' | Report | Fernando Forestieri 9', 60'; Óscar Arribas 23'; Bergson Da Silva 64'; Afiq Fazail (yellow card) 73'; Akhyar Rashid 77' | Stadium: Sultan Muhammad IV Stadium; Attendance: 2,500; Referee: Khirulazuan Bin Kidam |

| 29 July 2023 18 | Johor Darul Ta'zim | 2–0 | Selangor | Johor |
| 21:00 MYT | Heberty Fernandes 79'; Bergson Da Silva (yellow card) 35' (goal) 90' (pen.) | Report | Sharul Nazeem (yellow card) 44'; Alex Agyarkwa (yellow card) 51'; Fazly Mazlan (yellow card) 71'; Quentin Cheng (yellow card) 76'; Brendan Gan (yellow card) 90+1'; Harith Haiqal (yellow card) 90+2' | Stadium: Sultan Ibrahim Stadium; Attendance: 22,526; Referee: Fitri Bin Maskon |

| 9 August 2023 19 | Sabah | 1–5 | Johor Darul Ta'zim | Kota Kinabalu |
| 20:15 MYT | Jafri Firdaus Chew 13' (yellow card) 67'; Dominic Tan (yellow card) 28'; Ramon Machado (yellow card) 86' | Report | Juan Muñiz 17' (yellow card) 61'; Arif Aiman Hanapi (yellow card) 45+2'; Heberty Fernandes 48'; Bergson Da Silva 58' (pen.), 62', 73' | Stadium: Likas Stadium; Attendance: 15,203; Referee: Razlan Bin Joffri Ali |

| 13 August 2023 20 | Johor Darul Ta'zim | 5–0 | Perak | Johor |
| 20:15 MYT | Heberty Fernandez 21'; Matthew Davies 27'; Bergson Da Silva 35'; Feroz Baharudin (yellow card) 50'; Óscar Arribas (yellow card) 45+2' (goal) 55'; Juan Muñiz 66' | Report | Muhammad Aiman Khairul Yusni (yellow card) 11'; Firdaus Saiyadi (yellow card) 46'; Shivan Pillay (yellow card) 88' | Stadium: Sultan Ibrahim Stadium; Attendance: 11,622; Referee: Muhammad Usaid Bin Jamal |

| 26 August 2023 21 | Kedah Darul Aman | 3–3 | Johor Darul Ta'zim | Alor Setar |
| 21:00 MYT | Azrin Afiq (yellow card) 20'; Ifedayo Olusegun 36' (yellow card) 36'; Manuel Ott 50'; Kamil Akmal Halim (yellow card) 77'; Amirbek Juraboev 90+2' | Report | Feroz Baharudin (yellow card) 17'; La'Vere Corbin-Ong 52' Arif Aiman Hanapi 74' | Stadium: Darul Aman Stadium; Attendance: 11,800; Referee: Hasrol Amir |

| 27 September 2023 22 | Johor Darul Ta'zim | 4–0 | PDRM | Johor |
| 21:00 MYT | Fernando Forestieri 57' | Report | Mario Arques (yellow card) 35' | Stadium: Sultan Ibrahim Stadium; Attendance: 12,666; Referee: Fitri Bin Maskon |

| 29 October 2023 23 | Kelantan United | 0–2 | Johor Darul Ta'zim | Kota Bharu |
| 20:15 MYT | Dominik Balić (yellow card) 61'; Qayyum Marjoni (yellow card) 64'; Fandi Othman (yellow card) 90' | Report | Syahmi Safari (yellow card) 52'; Fernando Forestieri 75' | Stadium: Sultan Muhammad IV Stadium; Attendance: 697; Referee: Khairulsyahmi Ahmad |

| 24 November 2023 24 | Johor Darul Ta'zim | 2–0 | Kuching City | Johor |
| 21:00 MYT | Bergson Da Silva 90'; Juan Muñiz 43' | | | Stadium: Sultan Ibrahim Stadium |

| 3 December 2023 25 | Sri Pahang | 2–0 | Johor Darul Ta'zim | Kuantan |
| 20:15 MYT | Heberty Fernandes 6'; Bergson Da Silva 42' | | | Stadium: Darul Makmur Stadium |

| 17 December 2023 26 | Johor Darul Ta'zim | 8–0 | Penang | Johor |
| 21:00 MYT | Arif Aiman Hanapi 5', 47', 52', 90+6' (pen.) Bergson Da Silva 18', 33' (pen.); Akhyar Rashid 41'; Heberty Fernandes 43' | | | Stadium: Sultan Ibrahim Stadium |

Update: 5 January 2024

==== Table ====
| Pos | Team | Pld | W | D | L | GF | GA | GD | Pts | Qualification or relegation |
|---|---|---|---|---|---|---|---|---|---|---|
| 1 | Johor Darul Ta'zim (C) | 26 | 25 | 1 | 0 | 100 | 7 | +93 | 76 | Qualification for the AFC Champions League Elite league stage |
| 2 | Selangor | 26 | 20 | 1 | 5 | 72 | 22 | +50 | 61 | Qualification for the AFC Champions League Two group stage (Note: Since the winners of the 2023 Malaysia FA Cup (Johor Darul Ta'zim) qualified for Asian competition based on their league positions, the berths awarded to the 2nd-placed team in the league.) |
| 3 | Sabah | 26 | 17 | 3 | 6 | 64 | 33 | +31 | 54 | |
| 4 | Kedah Darul Aman | 26 | 17 | 2 | 7 | 52 | 29 | +23 | 53 | |
| 5 | Sri Pahang | 26 | 13 | 6 | 7 | 44 | 33 | +11 | 45 | |
| 6 | Terengganu | 26 | 11 | 7 | 8 | 45 | 34 | +11 | 40 | Qualification for the AFF Shopee Cup group stage (Note: Qualified as the 2023 Malaysia Cup & 2023 Malaysia FA Cup runner-up.) |
| 7 | Kuala Lumpur City | 26 | 10 | 8 | 8 | 44 | 39 | +5 | 38 | Qualification for the AFF Shopee Cup group stage |
| 8 | PDRM | 26 | 11 | 4 | 11 | 35 | 37 | −2 | 37 | |
| 9 | Negeri Sembilan | 26 | 6 | 9 | 11 | 33 | 49 | −16 | 27 | |
| 10 | Penang | 26 | 6 | 6 | 14 | 29 | 50 | −21 | 24 | |
| 11 | Perak | 26 | 6 | 4 | 16 | 25 | 55 | −30 | 22 | |
| 12 | Kelantan United | 26 | 4 | 5 | 17 | 29 | 65 | −36 | 17 | |
| 13 | Kuching City | 26 | 2 | 6 | 18 | 24 | 51 | −27 | 12 | |
| 14 | Kelantan (Note: MFL officially snubs Kelantan club licensing approval.) | 26 | 2 | 2 | 22 | 29 | 121 | −92 | 8 | Ejected from Malaysian Super League |

Source: MFL
Rules for classification: 1) Points; 2) Goal difference; 3) Number of goals scored.
(C) Champions

=== Malaysia FA Cup ===
| 14 April 2023 Second round | Johor Darul Ta'zim | 3–0 | PDRM | Johor |
| 22:00 MYT | Bergson Da Silva 3', 12' (pen.); Leandro Velazquez 27' (pen.) | Report | Izaaq Izhan (yellow card) 4'; Amir Saiful (yellow card) 6'; Marcus Macauley (yellow card) 84'; Uche Agba (yellow card) 85' | Stadium: Sultan Ibrahim Stadium; Attendance: 9,429; Referee: Jeevanathan M. Ponniamoorthy |

| 28 May 2023 Quarter-final | Johor Darul Ta'zim | 5–0 | Penang | Johor |
| 20:15 MYT | Ousmane Fané 32' (o.g.); Jordi Amat 38'; Arif Aiman Hanapi 49' (pen.); Endrick Dos Santos (yellow card) 51'; La'Vere Corbin-Ong 58' (yellow card) 63'; Syafiq Ahmad 90+2' | Report | Faris Shah Rosli (yellow card) 50'; Asnan Ahmad (yellow card) 87' | Stadium: Sultan Ibrahim Stadium; Attendance: 14,779; Referee: Ahmad Zuhaidi Dzulkifli |

| 26 June 2023 Semi-final | Johor Darul Ta'zim | 4–0 | Selangor | Johor |
| 21:00 MYT | Arif Aiman Hanapi 20', 33', 38' (yellow card) 27'; Fernando Forestieri 47' | Report | Yazan Al-Arab (yellow card) 7'; Khuzaimi Piee (yellow card) 48'; Mukhairi Ajmal (yellow card) 49'; Brendan Gan (yellow card) 80' | Stadium: Sultan Ibrahim Stadium; Attendance: 32,257; Referee: Hasrol Bin Amir |

| 22 July 2023 Final | Johor Darul Ta'zim | 2–0 | Kuala Lumpur City | Johor |
| 21:00 MYT | Feroz Baharudin (yellow card) 15'; Hong Wan 67'; Leandro Velazquez 74' (yellow card) 75'; Jordi Amat (yellow card) 79' | Report | Zhafri Yahya (yellow card) 14'; Sebastian Avanzini (yellow card) 25'; Kamal Azizi (yellow card) 90+3' | Stadium: Sultan Ibrahim Stadium; Attendance: 33,598; Referee: Muhammad Nazmi Bin Nasaruddin |

=== Malaysia Cup ===
==== Round of 16 ====
| 4 August 2023 R16 1st leg | Kelantan | 1–5 | Johor Darul Ta'zim | Kota Bharu |
| 21:00 MYT | Hafizan Ghazali (yellow card) 63'; Mohd Khala'if Naskam 86'; Yusri Yuhasmadi (yellow card) 86'; Leonardo Rolón (yellow card) 90' | Report | Bergson Da Silva 7'; Heberty Fernandes 16', 25'; Óscar Arribas (yellow card) 24'; Shahrul Saad 51'; Nazmi Faiz 68' | Stadium: Sultan Muhammad IV Stadium; Attendance: 1,700; Referee: Khairulsyahmi Ahmad Khalidi |

| 19 August 2023 R16 2nd leg | Johor Darul Ta'zim | 10–0 (15–1 agg.) | Kelantan | Johor |
| 21:00 MYT | Bergson Da Silva 21', 43', 73'; Takahiro Kunimoto 24', 37'; Juan Muñiz 54'; Daryl Sham 59'; Heberty Fernandes 61'; Arif Aiman Hanapi 64'; Aysar Hadi 90+3' | Report | Izaham Haslin (yellow card) 83' | Stadium: Sultan Ibrahim Stadium; Attendance: 11,719; Referee: Khirulazuan Kidam |

Johor Darul Ta'zim won 15–1 on aggregate.

==== Quarter Final ====
| 13 September 2023 QF 1st leg | Negeri Sembilan | 0–3 | Johor Darul Ta'zim | Paroi |
| 21:00 MYT | Nasrullah Haniff (yellow card) 65' | Report | Arif Aiman Hanapi 20'; Bergson Da Silva 31' (pen.), 90+1'; Afiq Fazail (yellow card) 45+2'; Juan Muñiz (yellow card) 64'; Nazmi Faiz (yellow card) 86' | Stadium: Tuanku Abdul Rahman Stadium; Attendance: 5,960; Referee: Suhaizi Shukri |

| 23 September 2023 QF 2nd leg | Johor Darul Ta'zim | 4–1 (7–1 agg.) | Negeri Sembilan | Johor |
| 21:00 MYT | Bergson Da Silva 6', 11'; Juan Muniz 29'; Fernando Forestieri 90+1' | Report | Zamri Pin Ramli (yellow card) 30' (goal) 39'; Hariz Kamarudin (yellow card) 85' | Stadium: Sultan Ibrahim Stadium; Attendance: 10,561; Referee: Usaid Jamal |

==== Semi Final ====
| 19 October 2023 SF 1st leg | Perak | 1–4 | Johor Darul Ta'zim | Ipoh |
| 21:00 MYT | Sunday Afolabi (yellow card) 28'; Wan Zack Haikal (yellow card) 38'; Luciano Guaycochea (yellow card) 45+1' (goal) 76' | Report | Óscar Arribas 7'; Arif Aiman Hanapi 12' (yellow card) 45+1'; Feroz Baharudin (yellow card) 58'; Shahrul Saad 71'; Nazmi Faiz 80'; Fernando Forestieri (yellow card) 86' | Stadium: Perak Stadium; Attendance: 21,613; Referee: S. Logeswaran |

| 2 November 2023 SF 2nd leg | Johor Darul Ta'zim | 8–1 (12–2 agg.) | Perak | Johor |
| 21:00 MYT | Arif Aiman Hanapi 12'; Bergson Da Silva 27', 60'; Heberty Fernandes 31', 90+1'; Fernando Forestieri 52'; Syafiq Ahmad 62', 77' | Report | Sunday Afolabi (yellow card) 36'; Firdaus Saiyadi 90+4' | Stadium: Sultan Ibrahim Stadium; Attendance: 14,485; Referee: Razlan Joffri Ali |

Johor Darul Ta'zim won 12–2 on aggregate.

==== Final ====
| 8 December 2023 Final | Johor Darul Ta'zim FC | 3–1 | Terengganu FC | Kuala Lumpur |
| 21:00 MYT | Bergson 6' (pen.); Feroz 73'; Arif Aiman 90+4' (pen.) | Report | Mamut 21' (pen.) | Stadium: Bukit Jalil National Stadium; Attendance: 80,550; Referee: S. Logeswaran |

=== AFC Champions League ===
==== Group stage ====
| Pos | Team | Pld | W | D | L | GF | GA | GD | Pts | Qualification | KWF | UHD | JDT | BGP |
|---|---|---|---|---|---|---|---|---|---|---|---|---|---|---|
| 1 | (Japan) Kawasaki Frontale | 6 | 5 | 1 | 0 | 17 | 6 | +11 | 16 | Advance to round of 16 | — | 1–0 | 5–0 | 4–2 |
| 2 | (South Korea) Ulsan Hyundai | 6 | 3 | 1 | 2 | 12 | 8 | +4 | 10 | Advance to round of 16 | 2–2 | — | 3–1 | 3–1 |
| 3 | (Malaysia) Johor Darul Ta'zim | 6 | 3 | 0 | 3 | 11 | 13 | −2 | 9 | | 0–1 | 2–1 | — | 4–1 |
| 4 | (Thailand) BG Pathum United | 6 | 0 | 0 | 6 | 9 | 22 | −13 | 0 | | 2–4 | 1–3 | 2–4 | — |

Source: AFC
Rules for classification: Tiebreakers

| 19 September 2023 Matchday 1 | Johor Darul Ta'zim (Malaysia) | 0–1 | (Japan) Kawasaki Frontale | Johor, Malaysia |
| 20:00 UTC+8 | Hong Wan (yellow card) 11'; Bergson (yellow card) 77'; Diogo Luis Santo (yellow card) 82'; Shane Lowry (yellow card) 90+2'; Juan Muñiz (yellow card) 90+5' | Report | Marcinho 45'; Shintaro Kurumaya (yellow card) 77'; Kento Tachibanada (yellow card) 81'; João Schmidt (yellow card) 90+5' | Stadium: Sultan Ibrahim Stadium; Attendance: 24,597; Referee: Abdulrahman Al-Jassim (Qatar); Man of the Match: (Brazil) Marcinho |

| 3 October 2023 Matchday 2 | BG Pathum United (Thailand) | 2–4 | (Malaysia) Johor Darul Ta'zim | Pathum Thani, Thailand |
| 19:00 UTC+7 | Victor Cardozo 5' (pen.), 55' (yellow card) 57'; Sarach Yooyen (yellow card) 73'; Igor Sergeyev (yellow card) 88'; Freddy Alvarez (yellow card) 90+4' | Report | Arif Aiman Hanapi 6', 78'; Bergson Da Silva 14'; Juan Muñiz 53' (yellow card) 63'; Hong Wan (yellow card) 85' | Stadium: BG Stadium; Attendance: 5,964; Referee: Mohammed Abdulla Hassan Mohamed (United Arab Emirates); Man of the Match: (Malaysia) Arif Aiman Hanapi |

| 24 October 2023 Matchday 3 | Ulsan Hyundai (South Korea) | 3–1 | (Malaysia) Johor Darul Ta'zim | Ulsan, South Korea |
| 19:00 UTC+9 | Jung Seung-hyun 5' (yellow card) 21'; Gustav Ludwigson 12', 18'; Kim Tae-hwan (yellow card) 25' (yellow-red card) 36'; Jang Si-Young (yellow card) 90+1' | Report | Bergson 53'; Matthew Davies (yellow card) 46'; Shane Lowry (yellow card) 54'; Feroz Baharudin (yellow card) 80' | Stadium: Ulsan Munsu Football Stadium; Attendance: 4,183; Referee: Alireza Faghani (Iran); Man of the Match: (Sweden) Gustav Ludwigson |

| 8 November 2023 Matchday 4 | Johor Darul Ta'zim (Malaysia) | 2–1 | (South Korea) Ulsan Hyundai | Johor, Malaysia |
| 20:00 UTC+8 | Heberty Fernandes 44' (yellow card) 77'; Shane Lowry (yellow card) 53'; Akhyar Rashid 87' | | Jung Seung-hyun (yellow card) 28'; Lee Kyu-seong (yellow card) 56'; Kim Young-gwon (yellow card) 65'; Ataru Esaka 69' | Stadium: Sultan Ibrahim Stadium; Referee: Shaun Evans (Australia) |

| 29 November 2023 Matchday 5 | Kawasaki Frontale (Japan) | 5–0 | (Malaysia) Johor Darul Ta'zim | Kawasaki, Japan |
| 19:00 UTC+9 | Ienaga 8'; Damião 50'; Marcinho 60'; Kobayashi 69'; Yamane 88' 69' | Report | | Stadium: Kawasaki Todoroki Stadium; Attendance: 9,274; Referee: Mohammed Abdulla Hassan Mohamed (United Arab Emirates) |

| 13 December 2023 Matchday 6 | Johor Darul Ta'zim (Malaysia) | 4–1 | (Thailand) BG Pathum United | Johor, Malaysia |
| 18:00 UTC+8 | Bergson 55' (pen.) 66'; Endrick 86'; Arif 90+2' | Report | Sergeev 28' | Stadium: Sultan Ibrahim Stadium; Referee: Ma Ning (China) |

== Competitions (JDT II) ==
=== MFL Cup ===
Win Draw Loss

| 3 March 2023 1 | Johor Darul Ta'zim II | 1–0 | Penang II | Johor |
| 20:15 UTC+8 | Aysar Hadi 47' (yellow card) 77'; Daryl Sham (yellow card) 36' | Report | | Stadium: Pasir Gudang Corporation Stadium; Attendance: 226; Referee: Izwan Abdullah |

| 9 March 2023 2 | PDRM II | 2–2 | Johor Darul Ta'zim II | Cyberjaya |
| 17:15 UTC+8 | Jacque Faye 59'; Ashraf Ahmad (yellow card) 42' | Report | Najmuddin Akmal 7'; Hazwan Bakri (yellow card) 75' | Stadium: MMU Stadium, Cyberjaya; Attendance: 232; Referee: Amiruddin Lantji |

| 14 March 2023 3 | Johor Darul Ta'zim II | 0–1 | Terengganu II | Johor |
| 20:15 UTC+8 | | Report | Syahmi Zamri 61' | Stadium: Pasir Gudang Corporation Stadium; Attendance: 303; Referee: Nasruddin Muhammad Tamrin |

| 30 March 2023 4 | Sabah II | 1–1 | Johor Darul Ta'zim II | Kota Kinabalu |
| 21:15 UTC+8 | Gabriel Nistelrooy 15' | Report | Njoku Jacob 50' (pen.) | Stadium: Likas Stadium; Attendance: 1,000; Referee: Nawal Mohamad Zubir |

| 2 April 2023 5 | Johor Darul Ta'zim II | 2–0 | FAM-MSN | Johor |
| 22:00 UTC+8 | Gabriel Nistelrooy 26'; Syukur Fariz 66' | Report | | Stadium: Pasir Gudang Corporation Stadium; Attendance: 272; Referee: Anselm Enterang |

| 11 April 2023 6 | Johor Darul Ta'zim II | 2–0 | Kelantan United II | Johor |
| | Hazwan Bakri 37' (pen.); Daryl Sham 50' | Report | | Stadium: Pasir Gudang Corporation Stadium; Referee: Latiffi Zahrom |

| 16 April 2023 7 | Kedah Darul Aman B | 2–1 | Johor Darul Ta'zim | Alor Setar |
| | Ebenezer Assifuah 22', 55' | | Aysar Hadi 13' | Stadium: Darul Aman Stadium; Referee: Fairuzi Mat Desa |

== Club statistics ==
Correct as of match played on 22 Aug 2023

=== Appearances (JDT) ===
@ 7 November 2023

| No. | Pos. | Player | Malaysia Super League | | FA Cup | | Malaysia Cup | | ACL / AFC Cup | | Charity Shield | | Total | |
| No. | Pos. | Player | Apps. | Goals | Apps. | Goals | Apps. | Goals | Apps. | Goals | Apps. | Goals | Apps. | Goals |
|---|---|---|---|---|---|---|---|---|---|---|---|---|---|---|
| 1 | GK | (Malaysia) Farizal Marlias | 0 | 0 | 2 | 0 | 2 | 0 | 0 | 0 | 0 | 0 | 4 | 0 |
| 2 | DF | (Malaysia) (Australia) Matthew Davies | 20 | 1 | 3 | 0 | 3 | 0 | 4 | 0 | 0 | 0 | 30 | 1 |
| 3 | DF | (Malaysia) Adam Nor Azlin | 0 | 0 | 0 | 0 | 0 | 0 | 0 | 0 | 0 | 0 | 0 | 0 |
| 4 | MF | (Malaysia) Afiq Fazail | 9(8) | 0 | 2 | 0 | 2 | 0 | 4 | 0 | 0 | 0 | 17(8) | 0 |
| 5 | DF | (Indonesia) (Spain) Jordi Amat | 20 | 0 | 4 | 1 | 2 | 0 | 4 | 0 | 0 | 0 | 30 | 1 |
| 6 | MF | (Malaysia) (England) Hong Wan | 21(1) | 0 | 3 | 1 | 4 | 0 | 4 | 0 | 0 | 0 | 32(1) | 1 |
| 7 | DF | (Malaysia) Aidil Zafuan | 0(1) | 0 | 0 | 0 | 0 | 0 | 0 | 0 | 0 | 0 | 0(1) | 0 |
| 8 | MF | (Malaysia) Safiq Rahim | 0(8) | 1 | 0 | 0 | 1(2) | 0 | 0(2) | 0 | 0 | 0 | 1(12) | 1 |
| 9 | FW | (Brazil) Bergson | 15(3) | 17 | 2 | 2 | 5 | 10 | 4 | 2 | 0 | 0 | 26(3) | 31 |
| 10 | MF | (Argentina) Leandro Velazquez | 9(5) | 5 | 3(1) | 2 | 0 | 0 | 0 | 0 | 0 | 0 | 12(6) | 7 |
| 11 | FW | (Brazil) Diogo | 8(2) | 7 | 2 | 0 | 0(1) | 0 | 0(1) | 0 | 0 | 0 | 10(4) | 7 |
| 12 | DF | (Malaysia) S. Kunanlan | 0 | 0 | 0 | 0 | 0 | 0 | 0 | 0 | 0 | 0 | 0 | 0 |
| 13 | MF | (Malaysia) (The Gambia) Mohamadou Sumareh | 0 | 0 | 0(2) | 0 | 1(2) | 0 | 0 | 0 | 0 | 0 | 1(4) | 0 |
| 14 | DF | (Australia) (Republic of Ireland) Shane Lowry | 5(2) | 0 | 2 | 0 | 0(1) | 0 | 4 | 0 | 0 | 0 | 11(3) | 0 |
| 15 | DF | (Malaysia) Feroz Baharudin | 18(1) | 2 | 2 | 2 | 3 | 0 | 0(2) | 0 | 0 | 0 | 25(3) | 2 |
| 16 | MF | (Malaysia) Danial Amier Norhisham | 0 | 0 | 0 | 0 | 0 | 0 | 0 | 0 | 0 | 0 | 0 | 0 |
| 17 | FW | (Malaysia) Ramadhan Saifullah | 0(5) | 0 | 0(1) | 0 | 1 | 0 | 0(1) | 0 | 0 | 0 | 1(7) | 0 |
| 18 | FW | (Malaysia) Hazwan Bakri | 0 | 0 | 0 | 0 | 0 | 0 | 0 | 0 | 0 | 0 | 0 | 0 |
| 19 | FW | (Malaysia) Akhyar Rashid | 1(10) | 2 | 1(2) | 0 | 1 | 0 | 0(1) | 1 | 0 | 0 | 3(13) | 3 |
| 20 | FW | (Spain) Juan Muñiz | 13(6) | 8 | 2(2) | 0 | 4 | 2 | 3 | 1 | 0 | 0 | 22(8) | 11 |
| 21 | MF | (Malaysia) Nazmi Faiz | 1(2) | 0 | 0 | 0 | 1(2) | 1 | 0 | 0 | 0 | 0 | 2(4) | 1 |
| 22 | DF | (Malaysia) (Canada) Corbin-Ong | 14(4) | 3 | 4 | 1 | 1 | 0 | 3(1) | 0 | 0 | 0 | 21(5) | 4 |
| 23 | MF | (Malaysia) (Brazil) Endrick | 9(6) | 3 | 1 | 0 | 0(1) | 0 | 0(3) | 0 | 0 | 0 | 10(10) | 3 |
| 24 | MF | (Philippines) (Spain) Óscar Arribas | 11(5) | 3 | 0(1) | 0 | 5 | 1 | 1 | 0 | 0 | 0 | 17(6) | 4 |
| 26 | GK | (Malaysia) Haziq Nadzli | 0 | 0 | 0 | 0 | 0 | 0 | 0 | 0 | 0 | 0 | 0 | 0 |
| 28 | FW | (Malaysia) Syafiq Ahmad | 0(6) | 0 | 0(2) | 1 | 0(1) | 0 | 0 | 0 | 0 | 0 | 0(9) | 1 |
| 29 | FW | (Malaysia) Safawi Rasid | 0(2) | 0 | 0 | 0 | 0(1) | 0 | 0 | 0 | 0 | 0 | 0(3) | 0 |
| 30 | MF | (Malaysia) (Spain) Natxo Insa | 0(3) | 0 | 1 | 0 | 0 | 0 | 0 | 0 | 0 | 0 | 1(3) | 0 |
| 32 | DF | (Malaysia) Shahrul Saad | 2(5) | 0 | 1(1) | 0 | 2(1) | 2 | 0(1) | 0 | 0 | 0 | 5(8) | 2 |
| 33 | GK | (Malaysia) Syihan Hazmi | 23 | 0 | 2 | 0 | 2 | 0 | 4 | 0 | 0 | 0 | 31 | 0 |
| 37 | FW | (Brazil) Heberty Fernandes | 4(1) | 4 | 0 | 0 | 4 | 5 | 4 | 0 | 0 | 0 | 12(1) | 10 |
| 40 | DF | (Malaysia) Adam Farhan Mohd Faizal | 0(1) | 0 | 0(1) | 0 | 0 | 0 | 0 | 0 | 0 | 0 | 0(2) | 0 |
| 41 | MF | (Malaysia) Ahmad Aysar Hadi Mohd Shapri | 0 | 0 | 0 | 0 | 0(2) | 1 | 0 | 0 | 0 | 0 | 0(2) | 1 |
| 42 | FW | (Malaysia) Arif Aiman Hanapi | 18(1) | 8 | 4 | 4 | 3(1) | 4 | 4 | 2 | 0 | 0 | 29(2) | 18 |
| 45 | FW | (Argentina) (Italy) Fernando Forestieri | 17(1) | 19 | 3 | 1 | 1(1) | 2 | 1(2) | 0 | 0 | 0 | 22(4) | 22 |
| 77 | MF | (Malaysia) Syamer Kutty Abba | 1(7) | 0 | 0(3) | 0 | 1 | 0 | 0(1) | 0 | 0 | 0 | 2(11) | 0 |
| 81 | MF | (Malaysia) (Philippines) Daryl Sham | 0 | 0 | 0 | 0 | 0(3) | 1 | 0 | 0 | 0 | 0 | 0(3) | 1 |
| 88 | MF | (Japan) Takahiro Kunimoto | 2(1) | 0 | 0 | 0 | 2(1) | 2 | 0 | 0 | 0 | 0 | 4(2) | 2 |
| 91 | DF | (Malaysia) Syahmi Safari | 1(8) | 1 | 0(1) | 0 | 2 | 0 | 0(2) | 0 | 0 | 0 | 3(11) | 1 |
Players who have contracts but are on loan to other clubs
| 20 | DF | (Malaysia) Azrif Nasrulhaq | 0 | 0 | 0 | 0 | 0 | 0 | 0 | 0 | 0 | 0 | 0 | 0 |
| 24 | GK | (Malaysia) Izham Tarmizi | 0 | 0 | 0 | 0 | 0 | 0 | 0 | 0 | 0 | 0 | 0 | 0 |
| 25 | FW | (Mali) (Spain) Moussa Sidibé | 0 | 0 | 0 | 0 | 0 | 0 | 0 | 0 | 0 | 0 | 0 | 0 |
| 31 | FW | (Malaysia) (Brazil) Guilherme de Paula | 0 | 0 | 0 | 0 | 0 | 0 | 0 | 0 | 0 | 0 | 0 | 0 |
| 33 | DF | (Malaysia) (England) Daniel Ting | 0 | 0 | 0 | 0 | 0 | 0 | 0 | 0 | 0 | 0 | 0 | 0 |
| 92 | FW | (Gabon) Lévy Madinda | 0 | 0 | 0 | 0 | 0 | 0 | 0 | 0 | 0 | 0 | 0 | 0 |
Players who have played this season but had left the club or on loan to other club
| 23 | DF | (Philippines) (Spain) Carli de Murga | 0 | 0 | 0 | 0 | 0 | 0 | 0 | 0 | 0 | 0 | 0 | 0 |
| 38 | MF | (Malaysia) (England) Junior Eldstål | 0 | 0 | 0 | 0 | 0 | 0 | 0 | 0 | 0 | 0 | 0 | 0 |

=== Appearances (JDT II) ===
@ 15 Apr 2023

| No. | Pos. | Player | Malaysia Football League | | Total | |
| No. | Pos. | Player | Apps. | Goals | Apps. | Goals |
|---|---|---|---|---|---|---|
| 1 | GK | (Malaysia) Zulhilmi Sharani | 5 | 0 | 0 | 0 |
| 2 | DF | (Malaysia) Nafizuddin Fauzi | 3+4 | 0 | 0 | 0 |
| 5 | DF | (Malaysia) Syahirul Fazly | 5+1 | 0 | 0 | 0 |
| 7 | MF | (Malaysia) Najmuddin Akmal | 5+1 | 1 | 0 | 0 |
| 8 | MF | (Malaysia) Nizarruddin Jazi | 6+1 | 0 | 0 | 0 |
| 9 | FW | (Malaysia) Gabriel Nistelrooy | 2+3 | 2 | 0 | 0 |
| 10 | MF | (Malaysia) Aiman Danish | 1+3 | 0 | 0 | 0 |
| 11 | MF | (Malaysia) Alif Mutalib | 1+3 | 0 | 0 | 0 |
| 12 | MF | (Malaysia) Ziad El Basheer | 3+1 | 0 | 0 | 0 |
| 13 | MF | (Malaysia) Aysar Hadi | 6 | 2 | 0 | 0 |
| 14 | MF | (Malaysia) Chia Rou Han | 0+2 | 0 | 0 | 0 |
| 16 | DF | (Malaysia) Ahmad Irfan | 4+1 | 0 | 0 | 0 |
| 17 | FW | (Malaysia) Danie Asyraf | 0+2 | 0 | 0 | 0 |
| 18 | MF | (Malaysia) Daryl Sham | 7 | 1 | 0 | 0 |
| 21 | DF | (Malaysia) Marwan Rahman | 1+1 | 0 | 0 | 0 |
| 23 | DF | (Malaysia) (Scotland) Fergus Tierney | 0+6 | 0 | 0 | 0 |
| 26 | DF | (Malaysia) Umar Hakeem | 6 | 0 | 0 | 0 |
| 28 | DF | (Malaysia) Adam Farhan | 4 | 0 | 0 | 0 |
| 29 | MF | (Malaysia) Syukur Fariz | 0+3 | 1 | 0 | 0 |
| 30 | MF | (Malaysia) Danish Hakimi | 0+1 | 0 | 0 | 0 |
| 31 | FW | (Malaysia) (The Gambia) Mohamadou Sumareh | 1 | 0 | 0 | 0 |
| 41 | DF | (Australia) (Republic of Ireland) Shane Lowry | 1 | 0 | 0 | 0 |
| 47 | MF | (Malaysia) Ramadhan Saifullah | 1 | 0 | 0 | 0 |
| 66 | MF | (Malaysia) Danial Amier Norhisham | 2+1 | 0 | 0 | 0 |
| 68 | FW | (Malaysia) Hazwan Bakri | 5 | 2 | 0 | 0 |
| 98 | GK | (Malaysia) Haziq Nadzli | 2 | 0 | 0 | 0 |
| 99 | DF | (Malaysia) Adam Nor Azlin | 5 | 0 | 0 | 0 |

== Goalscorers ==
Includes all competitive matches. The list is sorted by shirt number when total goals are equal.

As of match played 03 November 2023

| Rank | Pos. | No. | Player | Super League | FA Cup | Malaysia Cup | AFC Champions League | Total |
|---|---|---|---|---|---|---|---|---|
| 1 | FW | 9 | (Brazil) Bérgson Da Silva | 17 | 2 | 10 | 2 | 31 |
| 2 | FW | 45 | (Italy) Fernando Forestieri | 19 | 1 | 2 | 0 | 22 |
| 3 | FW | 42 | (Malaysia) Arif Aiman Hanapi | 8 | 4 | 4 | 2 | 18 |
| 4 | MF | 20 | (Spain) Juan Muñiz | 8 | 0 | 2 | 1 | 11 |
| 5 | FW | 37 | (Brazil) Heberty Fernandes | 4 | 0 | 5 | 1 | 10 |
| 6 | FW | 11 | (Brazil) Diogo Luis Santo | 7 | 0 | 0 | 0 | 7 |
| 6 | MF | 10 | (Argentina) Leandro Velazquez | 5 | 2 | 0 | 0 | 7 |
| 7 | DF | 22 | (Malaysia) La'Vere Corbin-Ong | 4 | 1 | 0 | 0 | 5 |
| 8 | MF | 23 | (Malaysia) Endrick Dos Santos | 4 | 0 | 0 | 0 | 4 |
| 8 | MF | 24 | (Philippines) Óscar Arribas | 3 | 0 | 1 | 0 | 4 |
| 9 | MF | 19 | (Malaysia) Akhyar Rashid | 2 | 0 | 0 | 1 | 3 |
| 9 | FW | 28 | (Malaysia) Syafiq Ahmad | 0 | 1 | 2 | 0 | 3 |
| 10 | DF | 15 | (Malaysia) Feroz Baharudin | 2 | 0 | 0 | 0 | 2 |
| 10 | MF | 88 | (Japan) Takahiro Kunimoto | 0 | 0 | 2 | 0 | 2 |
| 10 | DF | 32 | (Malaysia) Shahrul Saad | 0 | 0 | 2 | 0 | 2 |
| 10 | MF | 21 | (Malaysia) Nazmi Faiz | 0 | 0 | 2 | 0 | 2 |
| 11 | DF | 91 | (Malaysia) Syahmi Safari | 1 | 0 | 0 | 0 | 1 |
| 11 | MF | 8 | (Malaysia) Safiq Rahim | 1 | 0 | 0 | 0 | 1 |
| 11 | DF | 2 | (Malaysia) Matthew Davies | 1 | 0 | 0 | 0 | 1 |
| 11 | DF | 5 | (Indonesia) Jordi Amat | 0 | 1 | 0 | 0 | 1 |
| 11 | DF | 6 | (Malaysia) Hong Wan | 0 | 1 | 0 | 0 | 1 |
| 11 | MF | 41 | (Malaysia) Aysar Hadi | 0 | 0 | 1 | 0 | 1 |
| 11 | MF | 81 | (Malaysia) Daryl Sham | 0 | 0 | 1 | 0 | 1 |
| Own Goals | | | | 2 | 1 | 0 | 0 | 3 |
| TOTALS | | | | 88 | 14 | 34 | 7 | 143 |

== Top assists ==
| Rank | Pos. | No. | Player | Super League | FA Cup | Malaysia Cup | AFC Champions League | Total |
|---|---|---|---|---|---|---|---|---|
| 1 | FW | 42 | (Malaysia) Arif Aiman Hanapi | 11 | 1 | 3 | 1 | 16 |
| 2 | MF | 20 | (Spain) Juan Muniz | 6 | 2 | 5 | 0 | 13 |
| 3 | FW | 45 | (Italy) Fernando Forestieri | 7 | 3 | 1 | 1 | 12 |
| 4 | FW | 9 | (Brazil) Bérgson Da Silva | 4 | 0 | 4 | 0 | 8 |
| 5 | MF | 10 | (Argentina) Leandro Velazquez | 6 | 1 | 0 | 0 | 7 |
| 5 | FW | 11 | (Brazil) Diogo Luis Santo | 5 | 1 | 1 | 0 | 7 |
| 6 | DF | 2 | (Malaysia) Matthew Davies | 5 | 0 | 0 | 1 | 6 |
| 7 | FW | 37 | (Brazil) Heberty Fernandes | 2 | 0 | 2 | 1 | 5 |
| 8 | MF | 23 | (Malaysia) Endrick Dos Santos | 3 | 0 | 0 | 0 | 3 |
| 8 | DF | 5 | (Indonesia) Jordi Amat | 1 | 0 | 1 | 1 | 3 |
| 8 | MF | 81 | (Malaysia) Daryl Sham | 0 | 0 | 3 | 0 | 3 |
| 8 | MF | 88 | (Japan) Takahiro Kunimoto | 0 | 0 | 3 | 0 | 3 |
| 9 | DF | 22 | (Malaysia) La'Vere Corbin-Ong | 2 | 0 | 0 | 0 | 2 |
| 9 | DF | 14 | (Australia) Shane Lowry | 1 | 1 | 0 | 0 | 2 |
| 9 | FW | 17 | (Malaysia) Ramadhan Saifullah | 1 | 0 | 1 | 0 | 2 |
| 9 | DF | 15 | (Malaysia) Feroz Baharudin | 1 | 0 | 0 | 1 | 2 |
| 9 | DF | 4 | (Malaysia) Mohd Afiq Fazail | 0 | 1 | 0 | 1 | 2 |
| 10 | MF | 8 | (Malaysia) Safiq Rahim | 0 | 0 | 1 | 0 | 1 |
| 10 | DF | 6 | (Malaysia) Hong Wan | 0 | 0 | 1 | 0 | 1 |
| TOTALS | | | | 54 | 10 | 27 | 7 | 98 |
