= Aysar Hadi =

Malaysian footballer (born 2003)

Personal information
- Full name: Ahmad Aysar Hadi bin Mohd Shapri
- Date of birth: 4 September 2003 (age 23)
- Place of birth: Johor, Malaysia
- Height: 1.75 m (5 ft 9 in)
- Position: Defender

Team information
- Current team: Johor Darul Ta'zim II
- Number: 13

Youth career
- –2020: Johor Darul Ta'zim IV
- 2020–2022: Johor Darul Ta'zim II

Senior career*
Years	Team	Apps	(Gls)
2022–	Johor Darul Ta'zim II	23	(1)
2023–2024	Johor Darul Ta'zim	0	(0)

International career^{‡}
2022	Malaysia U19	4	(0)
2022	Malaysia U20	2	(0)
2025	Malaysia U23	5	(2)
2026–	Malaysia	2	(0)
Medal record
Men's football
Representing Malaysia
Malaysia U-19
ASEAN U-19 Boys' Championship
Winner	2022
- * Club domestic league appearances and goals as of 4 September 2026 ‡ National team caps and goals as of 4 September 2026

Ahmad Aysar Hadi bin Mohd Shapri (born 4 September 2003), simply known as Aysar Hadi, is a Malaysian professional footballer who plays as a defender for Malaysia A1 Semi-Pro League club Johor Darul Ta'zim II and the Malaysia national team.

He is known for his ability to play various positions in the backline, including full-back, centre-back, and defensive midfield.

== Club career ==
=== Johor Darul Ta'zim II ===
As a Johor native, Aysar Hadi went through the JDT youth setup before being promoted to Johor Darul Ta'zim II in 2022.

Captaining Johor Darul Ta'zim II, he won the 2024–25 MFL Cup after defeating Penang FC II 7–0 on the final matchday.

During the 2023 season, Aysar was promoted to Johor Darul Ta'zim for its matches in the Malaysia Cup. He made his debut against Kelantan, scoring the tenth goal in the 93rd minute of a 10-0 demolition.

In the same season, Aysar was also brought down to Johor Darul Ta'zim III, helping the squad win the President's Cup that season. He scored the second goal in a 3-1 first-leg final victory against Negeri Sembilan.

Aysar is the current captain of Johor Darul Ta'zim II.

== International career ==
=== Youth ===
During the 2022 AFF U-19 Championships, while captaining the national side, Aysar Hadi was sent off in the 69th minute following a high-footed challenge on a Timor-Leste player. Despite this, Aysar led his team to win the competition, which led to him being presented the Best Player Award of the entire tournament.

Aysar was included in the 25-man squad list for the AFC U-23 Asian Cup qualifiers in Bangkok. Against Mongolia, Aysar scored a header delivered by Aliff Izwan in a 7–0 victory. During the last group match of the qualifiers, Aysar scored in a 2–1 loss against Thailand.

On 11 December 2025, Aysar made his SEA Games debut in a 2–0 defeat against Vietnam.

=== Senior ===
Initially listed as a standby player, Aysar Hadi was called up for the first time on 20 July 2026 by Malaysia interim manager Tan Cheng Hoe to the 25-man final squad for the 2026 ASEAN Championship as a replacement for Dominic Tan.

In the tournament, Aysar first appeared as an unused substitute during the first matchday, when Malaysia came back from a goal down to beat Myanmar 2–1. Aysar made his debut in the first-leg semi-finals game against Vietnam on 16 August 2026, replacing the injured Rodney Celvin in the 16th minute. Aysar made his first start just three days later in the second leg of the semi-finals, where he made a crucial tackle and clearance against Phan Tuấn Tài to prevent a key pass to Nguyễn Đình Bắc in the six-yard box.

== Career statistics ==
=== International ===
As of match played 4 September 2026

Appearances and goals by national team and year
National team	Year	Apps	Goals
Malaysia U19	2022	4	0
Malaysia U20	2022	2	0
Malaysia U22	2025	5	2
Malaysia	2026	2	0
Total		13	2

== Honours ==
JDT II

- MFL Cup: 2024–25

Malaysia U19

- AFF U19 Youth: 2022

Malaysia U22

- SEA Games: 2025
