= Hong Wan =

Malaysian footballer (born 2000)

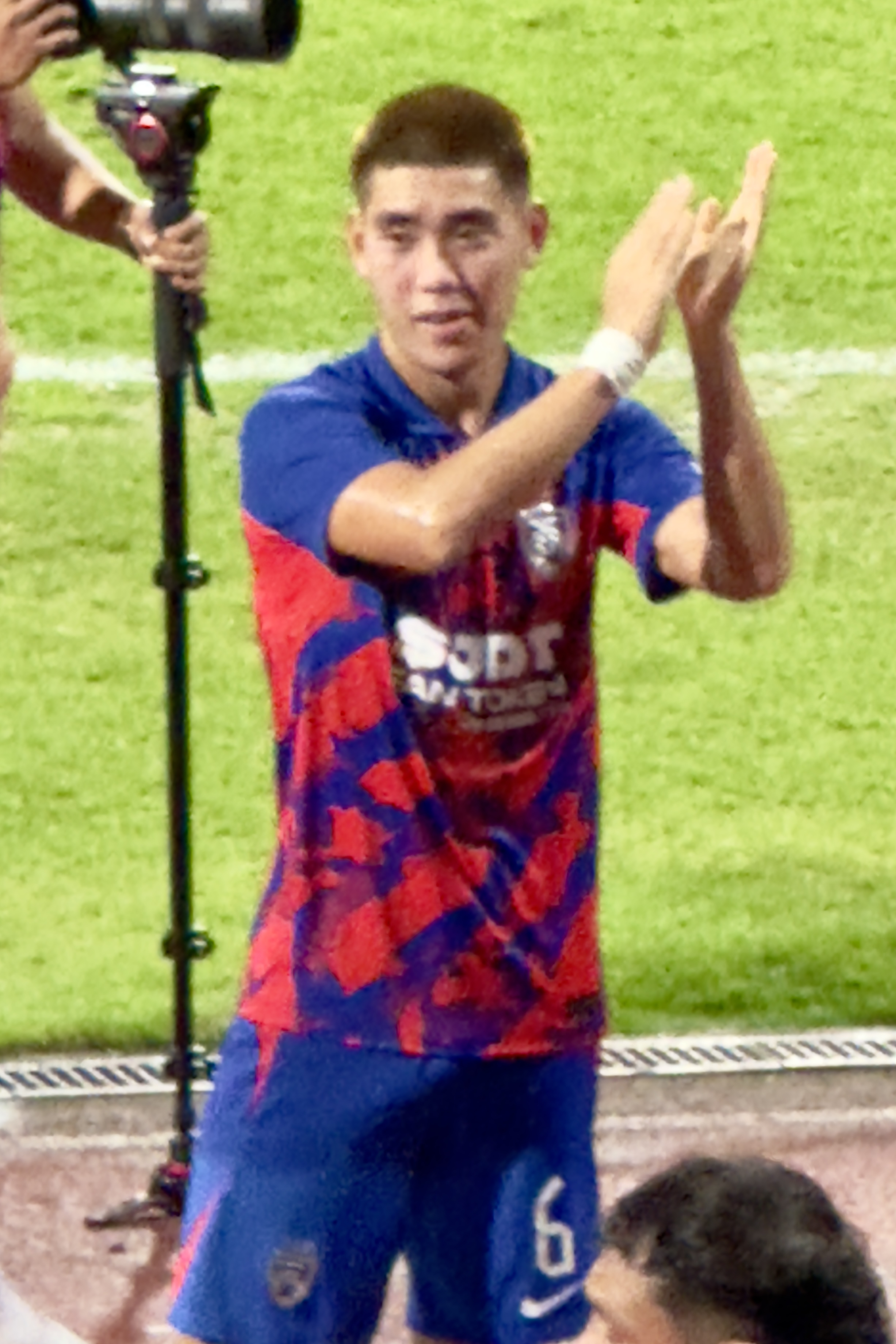
- Hong Wan with Johor Darul Ta'zim in 2024

Personal information
- Full name: Nathaniel Shio Hong Wan
- Date of birth: 17 August 2000 (age 26)
- Place of birth: Croydon, England
- Height: 1.76 m (5 ft 9 in)
- Position: Midfielder

Team information
- Current team: Johor Darul Ta'zim
- Number: 6

Youth career
- 2006–2017: Charlton Athletic
- 2017–2019: Yeovil Town
- 2019–2021: Wolverhampton Wanderers

Senior career*
Years	Team	Apps	(Gls)
2019–2021	Wolverhampton Wanderers	0	(0)
2020	→ Varaždin (loan)	0	(0)
2021–	Johor Darul Ta'zim	51	(0)

International career^{‡}
2026–	Malaysia	2	(0)
Medal record
Men's football
Representing Malaysia
FIFA ASEAN Cup
Third place	2026 Indonesia	Team
- * Club domestic league appearances and goals as of 17 January 2026 ‡ National team caps and goals as of 5 October 2026

Nathaniel Shio Hong Wan (Chinese: 温绍康; pinyin: Wēn Shàokāng; born 17 August 2000), commonly known as Hong Wan, is a professional footballer who plays as a midfielder for Malaysia Super League side Johor Darul Ta'zim. Born in England, he plays for the Malaysia national team.

== Early life ==
Hong Wan was born to a Malaysian mother and an English-Chinese father in Croydon, England. His mother is from Tangkak, Johor, Malaysia while his father was born in Beihai, Guangxi, China.

He started playing football when he was two and a half years old, and was scouted by Arsenal, Charlton and Crystal Palace in his first tournament. He joined Charlton Athletic Academy at the age of six.

== Club career ==
Hong Wan came through the academy of Charlton Athletic, before joining Yeovil Town in 2017. He was the captain of the under-18 squad, however, he failed to make a senior appearance for the club.

In 2019, Hong Wan signed for Wolverhampton Wanderers on a permanent deal. In July 2019, he joined the senior team for a friendly tournament in China, Premier League Asia Trophy. Wolves won the tournament with Hong Wan coming on as a substitute in two matches against Newcastle United and Manchester City.

In early 2020, he was loaned to Croatian side Varaždin, but made no senior appearances due to the COVID-19 pandemic before returning to Wolves four months later. Despite failing to make any Premier League appearance for Wolves, he managed to make 21 appearances for the club's under-23 team in the 2020–21 Premier League 2 Division 2 under manager James Collins.

On 30 June 2021, Hong Wan joined Malaysia Super League side Johor Darul Ta'zim on a free transfer, because he saw it as an opportunity to develop as a player and play at a high level. He made his competitive debut with JDT in the 2022 Piala Sumbangsih, the Malaysian super cup competition, coming on as a 90th-minute substitute. On 4 March 2022, Hong Wan made his league debut in the first round of the 2022 Malaysia Super League against Penang. During the 2023 season, he was regarded to have established himself as a regular starter for the club.

== International career ==
Due to his place of birth and parents' origin, Hong Wan was eligible to represent England, Malaysia, and China internationally.

In March 2022, he was called up to the Malaysia national football team training camp, ahead of friendly matches against the Philippines, Singapore, and Albirex Niigata Singapore. However, he did not make it to the final 25-man squad due to lack of fitness.

In September 2025, Hong Wan received his senior call-up to the Malaysia national team for friendlies against Singapore and Palestine, replacing the injured Hector Hevel, but did not feature in either match.

In October 2025, he was included in the 29-man squad for the 2027 AFC Asian Cup qualifying matches against Laos.

Hong Wan was selected for the final squad ahead of the 2026 FIFA ASEAN Cup in Indonesia. More than four years after his first call-up to the national team, he finally made his international debut on 1 October 2026 in the match against Singapore at the Si Jalak Harupat Stadium.

== Personal life ==
Hong Wan's father moved from China to England at a young age and his mother moved to England from Malaysia in her twenties to pursue her studies.

Hong Wan received his Malaysian passport and identity card in 2021 after joining Johor Darul Ta'zim.

== Career statistics ==
As of 15 January 2025

Appearances and goals by club, season and competition
Club	Season	League			National cup (Note: Includes Malaysia Cup)		League cup (Note: Includes Malaysia FA Cup)		Continental		Other		Total	
Club	Season	Division	Apps	Goals	Apps	Goals	Apps	Goals	Apps	Goals	Apps	Goals	Apps	Goals
Wolverhampton Wanderers U21s	2019–20	—	—		—		—		—		0	0	0	0
Wolverhampton Wanderers U21s	2020–21	—	—		—		—		—		1 (Note: Appearance in EFL Trophy)	0	1	0
Wolverhampton Wanderers U21s	Total		—		—		—		—		1	0	1	0
Johor Darul Ta'zim	2021	Malaysia Super League	0	0	0	0	—		0	0	—		0	0
Johor Darul Ta'zim	2022	Malaysia Super League	13	0	6	0	4	0	4 (Note: Appearances in AFC Champions League Elite)	0	1 (Note: Appearances in Piala Sumbangsih)	0	28	0
Johor Darul Ta'zim	2023	Malaysia Super League	26	0	6	0	3	1	5	0	1	0	41	1
Johor Darul Ta'zim	2024–25	Malaysia Super League	7	0	0	0	5	0	1	0	—		13	0
Johor Darul Ta'zim	Total		46	0	12	0	12	1	10	0	2	0	82	1
Career total			46	0	12	0	12	1	10	0	3	0	83	1

== Honours ==
=== Club ===
Johor Darul Ta'zim

- Malaysia Super League: 2022, 2023, 2024–25, 2025–26
- Malaysia Cup: 2022, 2023
- Malaysia FA Cup: 2022, 2023, 2024
- Malaysia Charity Shield: 2022, 2023

=== International ===
Malaysia

- FIFA ASEAN Cup third place: 2026

== See also ==
- List of Malaysia international footballers born outside Malaysia
