= List of Kelantan FA records and statistics =

Kelantan Football Association (Malay: Persatuan Bola Sepak Kelantan), is a professional football association based in Kota Bharu in the Malaysian state of Kelantan. The team had their first major success in the 2012 season when they won the League championship, Piala FA and Piala Malaysia. Domestically, Kelantan have won the Liga Super Championship on 2 occasions, most recently in the 2012 season, 2 Piala Malaysia, 2 Piala FA, 1 Piala Sumbangsih and 1 Liga Premier title. 2012 was their debut playing in the AFC Cup. They played well in the group stage to gain first place. However, the team lost in the quarter final to Erbil SC. Kelantan FA were the only team which won the Piala Emas Raja-Raja for the thirteen times.

Kelantan team became a symbol of unity of the people of Kelantan. It can be seen during the match when various background Kelantan fans come to the stadium to support their team. Kelantan team revival began when Annuar Musa took over the president post during 2009 season. Since then, Kelantan team has become among the respected team in the Malaysian football.

== Honours ==
As of 2 November 2017

=== Domestic ===
==== League ====
- Division 1/ Liga Super

Winners (2): 2011, 2012
Runners-up : 2010

- Division 2/ Liga Premier

Winners : 2000

- Division 3/ Liga FAM

Winners (3): 1953*, 1954, 2005 (* shared)
Runners-up : 1963, 1971, 1972

==== Cups ====
- Piala Malaysia

Winners (2): 2010, 2012
Runners-up : 1955, 1970, 2009, 2013

- Piala FA

Winners (2): 2012, 2013
Runners-up : 2009, 2011, 2015

- Piala Sumbangsih

Winners : 2011
Runners-up : 2012, 2013

=== Asian ===
- AFC Cup: 3 appearances
  - 2012: Quarter-finals (lost 2–6 on aggregate to Arbil)
  - 2013: Round of 16 (lost 0–2 to Kitchee)
  - 2014: Group stage (4th position)

=== Treble ===
- "Treble Winner" (Liga Super, Piala FA and Piala Malaysia): 1
  - 2012

=== U21 Team ===
- Piala Presiden

Winners (7): 1985, 1995, 2005, 2011, 2013, 2015, 2016
Runners-up : 1988, 2003, 2006–07

=== U19 Team ===
- Piala Belia

Winners (2): 2008, 2014
Runners-up : 2013

=== Record of success ===
Year	Competition	Score	Against	Result
1953	Liga FAM	1–1	Selangor	Shared
1954	Liga FAM	2–1	Malayan Combined Services	Champion
1963	Liga FAM	0–7	Singapura	Runner-up
1971	Liga FAM	2–5	Prisons	Runner-up
1972	Liga FAM	1–2	Selangor	Runner-up
2000	Liga Premier	-	-	Champion
2005	Liga FAM	2–0	Shahzan Muda	Champion
2005	Piala Agong	2–2 (lost 5–6 on penalties)	Pahang	Runner-up
2005	Piala Emas Raja-Raja	0–1	Kedah	Runner-up
2006	Piala Emas Raja-Raja	5–1	ATM	Champion
2009	Piala Emas Raja-Raja	4–0	Penang	Champion
2009	Piala FA	1–1 (lost 1–4 on penalties)	Selangor	Runner-up
2009	Piala Malaysia	1–3	Negeri Sembilan	Runner-up
2010	Piala Emas Raja-Raja	0–0 (won 4–3 on penalties)	Kedah	Champion
2010	Piala Malaysia	2–1	Negeri Sembilan	Champion
2010	Liga Super	59 Points	-	Runner-up
2011	Piala Sumbangsih	2–0	Selangor	Champion
2011	Piala FA	1–2	Terengganu	Runner-up
2011	Liga Super	56 Points	-	Champion
2012	Piala Sumbangsih	1–2	Negeri Sembilan	Runner-up
2012	Piala FA	1–0	Sime Darby	Champion
2012	Liga Super	60 Points	-	Champion
2012	Piala Malaysia	3–2	ATM	Champion
2013	Piala Sumbangsih	1–1 (lost 3–4 on penalties)	ATM	Runner-up
2013	Piala FA	1–0	Johor Darul Takzim	Champion
2013	Piala Malaysia	0–1	Pahang	Runner-up
2015	Piala FA	1–3	LionsXII	Runner-up

== League history ==
- 1998–2000: Liga Perdana 2 (2)
- 2001–2003: Liga Perdana 1 (1)
- 2004: Liga Premier (2)
- 2005: Liga FAM (3)
- 2006–2008: Liga Premier (2)
- 2009–: Liga Super (1)

== League records ==
As of 2 November 2017

Season	Position	Played	Won	Drawn	Lost	For	Against	Goal difference	Points
1986	8	15	5	5	5	24	23	+1	20
1987	7	16	8	4	4	32	16	+16	28
1988	3	16	9	2	5	30	15	+15	29
1989	9	16	2	3	11	8	26	–18	9
1990	2	14	9	2	3	38	15	+23	20
1991	10	18	5	1	12	22	42	–20	11
1992	3	14	5	4	5	27	18	+9	14
1994	9	28	11	7	10	48	42	+6	40
1995	15	28	5	8	15	31	49	–18	23
1996	15	28	4	5	19	18	52	–30	17
1997	13	28	8	4	16	33	58	–25	28
1998	3	14	6	6	2	20	16	+4	24
1999	5	18	7	2	6	23	26	–3	29
2000	1	18	10	6	2	48	21	+27	36
2001	3	22	11	5	6	33	21	+12	38
2002	10	26	9	3	14	29	41	–12	30
2003	10	24	7	7	10	31	52	–21	28
2004	9	24	1	7	16	13	42	–29	10
2005	N/a								
2005–06	6	21	7	5	9	29	36	–7	26
2006–07	8	20	4	8	8	23	31	–8	20
2007–08	3	24	16	5	3	59	30	+29	53
2009	6	26	14	2	10	49	36	+13	44
2010	2	26	17	8	1	50	14	+36	59
2011	1	26	17	5	4	52	21	+31	56
2012	1	26	18	6	2	53	18	+35	60
2013	4	22	10	6	6	32	20	+12	36
2014	6	22	10	1	11	26	29	–3	31
2015	9	22	8	4	10	34	38	–4	28
2016	4	22	7	8	7	37	33	+4	29
2017	10	22	7	4	11	31	39	–8	22 (Note: Mohd Nasharizam Abd Rashid was loaned to Perlis FA until the end of the 2017 season.)

Remarks:

== Player records ==
(2008–present)

=== Appearances ===
- Most appearances in total (League & Cup) – 356 Mohd Badhri Mohd Radzi (2008–)
- Most League appearances – 219 Mohd Badhri Mohd Radzi (2008–)

=== Goalscoring ===
- Leading Goalscorer (League & Cup) – 95 Mohd Badhri Mohd Radzi (2008–)
- Leading Goalscorer (League only) – 55 Mohd Badhri Mohd Radzi (2008–)
- Leading Goalscorer (Piala FA) –
- Leading Goalscorer (Piala Malaysia) – 22 Indra Putra Mahayuddin (2009–2010, 2012–2013, 2016–)
- Leading Goalscorer (AFC Cup) – 7 Mohammed Ghaddar (2012), Mohd Badhri Mohd Radzi (2012–2014)

==== Top goalscorer by years ====
Years	Name	League	Piala FA	Piala Malaysia	AFC Cup	Others	Total
1990	(Malaysia) Mohd Hashim Mustapha (Thailand) Boonphop Praphut	13	—	—	—	—	13
1992	(Poland) Dariusz Dudala	9	—	—	—	—	9
1993	(Malaysia) Mohd Hashim Mustapha	13	—	—	—	—	13
1994	(Malaysia) Mohd Hashim Mustapha	25	0	1	—	—	26
1995	(Malaysia) Mohd Hashim Mustapha	11	0	—	—	—	11
2000	(Malaysia) Anuar Abu Bakar	15	2	?	—	—	17
2002	(Thailand) Worrawoot Srimaka	15	3	3	—	—	21
2003	(Malaysia) Fatrurazi Rozi	7	0	2	—	—	9
2004	(Malaysia) Khairul Zal Azmi Zahinudden	3	1	—	—	—	4
2005	N/A						
2006–07	N/A						
2007–08	(Senegal) Mohamed Moustapha N'diaye	27	2 (Note: Goals in 2008 Piala FA)	3 (Note: Goals in 2008 Piala Malaysia)	—	—	32
2009	(Malaysia) Indra Putra Mahayuddin	14	5	11	—	—	30
2010	(Malaysia) Norshahrul Idlan	11	0	3	—	—	14
2011	(Malaysia) Norshahrul Idlan (Note: 2011 Piala Sumbangsih competition also counted as Liga Super match)	18	2	4	—	1 (Note: Goals in 2011 Piala Sumbangsih)	24*
2012	(Lebanon) Mohammed Ghaddar	6	2	0	7	—	15
2013	(Malaysia) Mohd Badhri Mohd Radzi	6	1	5	4	—	16
2014	(Liberia) Francis Doe	5	2	6	0	—	13
2015	(Brazil) Gilmar	6	0	5	—	—	11
2016	(North Macedonia) Blazhe Ilijoski	14	1	1	—	—	16
2017	(Malaysia) Khairul Izuan Rosli	2	0	3	—	—	5

Last updated: 2 November 2017.
Source: TRWFC

== Team records ==
(2009–present)

=== Matches ===
==== Record wins ====
- Record League win: 6–0 v FELDA United, Liga Super, 9 April 2011, 6–0 v Perak, Liga Super, 7 July 2012
- Record Piala FA win: 5–1 v PDRM, Second Round 1st leg, 21 February 2009, 1–5 v Selangor, Semi-Final 1st leg, 30 March 2011
- Record Piala Malaysia win: 6–1 v Terengganu, Group Stage, 14 September 2012, 6–1 v Johor Darul Ta'zim, Quarter-Final 2nd leg, 4 October 2013
- Record AFC Cup win: 5–0 v SHB Đà Nẵng, Group Stage, 2 April 2013
- Record home win: 6–0 v FELDA United, Liga Super, 9 April 2011, 6–0 v Perak, Liga Super, 7 July 2012
- Record away win: 1–6 v Terengganu, Liga Super, 15 July 2016

==== Record defeats ====
- Record League defeat: 5–3 v Pahang, Liga Super, 12 August 2015
- Record FA Cup defeat: 4–2 v Terengganu, Semi-Final 2nd leg, 28 May 2013
- Record Malaysia Cup defeat: 4–2 v Johor Darul Ta'zim, Quarter-Final 1st leg, 28 September 2013, 1–4 v Selangor, Group Stage, 12 August 2016
- Record AFC Cup defeat: 1–6 v Maziya, Group Stage, 23 April 2013
- Record home defeat: 2–5 v Selangor, Liga Super, 21 May 2016
- Record away defeat: 1–6 v Maziya, Group Stage, 23 April 2013

==== Sequences ====
- Longest sequence of League wins: 6 (6 January 2009 – 17 February 2009)
- Longest sequence of League defeats: 5 (2 May 2009 – 23 May 2009)
- Longest sequence of League draws: 3 (15 January 2013 – 22 January 2013)
- Longest unbeaten run: 22 (23 January 2010 – 3 August 2010)
- Longest run without a win: 6 (11 April 2009 – 23 May 2009), (21 February 2015 – 18 April 2015)
- Longest run without a draw: 15 (22 March 2014 – 25 June 2014)
- Longest successive scoring run: 10 (11 February 2012 – 12 May 2012)
- Longest successive non-scoring run: 3 (19 January 2013 – 16 February 2013)
- Longest run without a clean sheet: 16 (6 January 2009 – 23 May 2009)
- Longest run of clean sheets: 6 (22 April 2011 – 10 May 2011) achieved by Khairul Fahmi Che Mat

Updated: 8 March 2017

== Foreign players ==
Years	Player 1	Player 2	Player 3	Player 4	Others ^{1}
2017	(The Gambia) Mamadou Danso	(Senegal) Morgaro Gomis	(Brazil) Alessandro Celin	(Lebanon) Abou Bakr Al-Mel	(Lebanon) Mohammed Ghaddar
2016	(Senegal) Morgaro Gomis	(Brazil) Wander Luiz	(North Macedonia) Baže Ilijoski	(Australia) Jonathan McKain	(Brazil) Jonatan Lucca (Mali) Dramane Traoré
2015	(Brazil) Gilmar	(Nigeria) Austin Amutu	(Colombia) Erwin Carrillo	(Australia) Jonathan McKain	(Liberia) Isaac Pupo (Cameroon) Emmanuel Kenmogne
2014	(Egypt) Mohamed Shawky	(Ghana) Prince Tagoe	(Liberia) Francis Doe	(Iraq) Hussein Alaa Hussein	—N/a
2013	(Nigeria) Obinna Nwaneri	(Nigeria) Dickson Nwakaeme	(Croatia) Lek Kcira	(Australia) Dimitri Petratos	(Ghana) Denny Antwi (Ghana) Emmanuel Okine
2012	(Nigeria) Obinna Nwaneri	(Lebanon) Mohammed Ghaddar	(Croatia) Mijo Dadic	(Guinea) Keita Mandjou	(Nigeria) Onyekachi Nwoha
2008	(Senegal) Mohamed Moustapha	(Nigeria) Inerepamo Andrew Amukuro	(Czech Republic) Jan Nečas	—N/a	—N/a
2006–07	(Argentina) Luciano Olier	(Argentina) Gustavo Alberto Romero	(Argentina) Jonathan Javier Zarini	(Chile) Danilo Alejandro	—N/a
2007	(Chile) Patricio Acevedo	(Argentina) Gustavo Alberto Romero	—N/a	—N/a	—N/a
2006	(Niger) Haruna Al Hassan	(Thailand) Suriya Domtaisong	(Thailand) Worrawoot Srimaka	(Thailand) Sarif Sainui	(Chile) Patricio Acevedo
2005	(Niger) Haruna Al Hassan	(Niger) Mohammed Muyei	(Liberia) Arcadia Toe	(Thailand) Worrawoot Srimaka	(Thailand) Sarif Sainui
2004	(Niger) Haruna Al Hassan	(Niger) Mohammed Muyei	(Liberia) Arcadia Toe	—N/a	—N/a
2003	(Slovenia) Martin Adamec	(Niger) Mohammed Muyei	—N/a	—N/a	—N/a
2002	(Thailand) Syed Bukhari	(Thailand) Voravut Srikama	—N/a	—N/a	—N/a
1998	(Ghana) Adamu Moro Tigana	(Argentina) Luis Pablo Pozzuto	—N/a	—N/a	(Argentina) Mario Gomez
1997	(Argentina) Mario Gomez	(Argentina) Luis Pablo Pozzuto	—N/a	—N/a	—N/a
1996	(Iraq) Riyadh Abbas	(Russia) Fail Nizamovich	—N/a	—N/a	—N/a
1995	(Ghana) Ishaq Debrah	(Ghana) Edward Abougye	(Liberia) Alexander Freeman	—N/a	—N/a
1994	(Croatia) Sandro Radun	(Singapore) V. Sundramoorthy	(Australia) Gerry Gomez	—N/a	—N/a
1993	(Bulgaria) Dmitri Kalkanov	(Socialist Federal Republic of Yugoslavia) Marko Kraljević	(Australia) Michael Roki	—N/a	—N/a
1992	(Poland) Dariusz Dudala	(Socialist Federal Republic of Yugoslavia) Marko Kraljević	Gregor Kovalski	—N/a	—N/a
1991	(Socialist Federal Republic of Yugoslavia) Sandro Radun	(Socialist Federal Republic of Yugoslavia) Miloslav Nikolic	(Socialist Federal Republic of Yugoslavia) Marko Kraljević	—N/a	—N/a
1990	(Thailand) Boonphob Praphut	(Thailand) Anan Phangseng	(Thailand) Prasert Changmool	—N/a	—N/a
1989	(Singapore) Razali Rashid	(Singapore) Ahmad Ibrahim Maksudi	(Indonesia) Robby Darwis	—N/a	—N/a

- Notes: 2009-2011: foreign players banned.
- ^1 Foreign players who left the club during mid season OR loan out during the season.

== Awards ==
Football Association of Malaysia National Football Awards

Season	Player	Awards
2009	Indra Putra Mahayuddin	Best Striker / Most Valuable Player
2010	B. Sathianathan	Best Coach
2010	Khairul Fahmi Che Mat	Best Goalkeeper / Best Young Players
2010	Norshahrul Idlan Talaha	Best Striker / Most Valuable Player
2011	Khairul Fahmi Che Mat	Best Goalkeeper
2011	Norshahrul Idlan Talaha	Best Striker / Most Valuable Player Supermokh
2012	Khairul Fahmi Che Mat	Best Goalkeeper
2012	Norshahrul Idlan Talaha	Best Striker / Most Valuable Player Supermokh
2012	Kelantan FA	The Best Association
2013	Kelantan FA	The Best Supporter Clubs
2013	Khairul Fahmi Che Mat	Best Goalkeeper
2013	Mohd Badhri Mohd Radzi	Best Midfielder / Most Valuable Player
2013	Mohd Nor Farhan Muhammad	Best Striker
2014	Mohd Badhri Mohd Radzi	Best Midfielder
2016	Khairul Fahmi Che Mat	Best Goalkeeper

== Others ==
=== Season Goalscorers ===
==== 1992 ====
- Azli Mahmood (7 goals)
- Mohd Hashim Mustapha (6 goals)

==== 1990 ====
- Prasert Changmool (7 goals)

== Players by season ==
=== 2006–07 ===
No.	Pos.	Name	Goal
–	FW	Mohd Saufi Sa'adi	2 (Note: 1 goal scored during Piala FA competition.)
–	FW	Gustavo Alberto Romero	6 (Note: 1 goal each scored during Piala FA and Piala Malaysia competitions.)
–	FW	Jonathan Javier Zarini	2
–	FW	Danilo Alejandro	1
–	FW	Luciano Olier	5 (Note: 3 goals scored during Piala Malaysia competition.)
–	FW	Faizul Che Noh	7 (Note: 2 goals each scored during Piala FA and Piala Malaysia competitions.)
–	MF	Khairan Eroza Razali	3 (Note: 1 goal scored during Piala FA competition.)
–	MF	Zairul Fitree Ishak	1
–	MF	Armain Zairi	1
–	DF	Rizal Fahmi Rosid	1
–	MF	Mohd Safuan Ibrahim	4 (Note: 3 goals scored during Piala Malaysia competition.)
–	GK	Amini Ahmad Tabarani	1
–		Mohd Faisal Mohamad	1
–		Mohd Faizal Mat Yusof	1 (Note: 1 goal scored during Piala Malaysia competition.)
–	FW	Zool Ihsan Yunus	1 (Note: 1 goal scored during Piala Malaysia competition.)
–	DF	Faizal Che Noh	1 (Note: 1 goal scored during Piala Malaysia competition.)
–	FW	Diego Alberto Albertini	4 (Note: 4 goals scored during Piala Malaysia competition.)

=== 2002 ===
No.	Pos.	Name	Goal
1	GK	Mohd Sani Fahmi	0
23	GK	Mohd Shahrizan Ismail	0
3	DF	Rosmaini Ismail	0
5	DF	Zaidi Mat Ail	0
12	DF	Azman Yusoff	0
15	DF	Saifulnizam Husin	0
16	DF	Akmal Tabrani	0
21	DF	Sarudy Aziz	0
2	MF	Syed Bukhari	0
4	MF	Admin Ismail	0
6	MF	Arman Zairi Johan	0
11	MF	Mohd Nor Derus	0
13	MF	Tuan Kamree Tuan Yahya	0
25	MF	Rozmin Musa	0
15	FW	Fatrurazi Rozi	4 (Note: 1 goal scored during Piala FA competition.)
19	FW	Hardi Ahmad	2 (Note: 1 goal scored during Piala FA competition.)
20	FW	Voravut Srikama	3 (Note: 1 goal scored during Piala FA competition.)
–	FW	Ahmad Syiham	0

=== 2001 ===
No.	Pos.	Name	Goal
–	GK	Mohd Sani Fahmi	0
–	GK	Mohd Shahrizan Ismail	0
–	DF	Roslisham Nor	1
–	DF	Arman Zairi	1
–	DF	Rosli Omar	0
–	DF	Azman Yusoff	1
–	DF	Rosmaini Ismail	0
–	DF	Asmizan Che Abdullah	0
–	DF	Sarudy Aziz	0
–	DF	Saifulnizam Husin	0
–	DF	Armin Shariff	0
–	DF	S. Sivaram	2 (Note: 1 goal each scored during Malaysia FA Cup and Malaysia Cup competitions.)
–	MF	Baharuddin Ali	0
–	MF	Admin Ismail	0
–	MF	Nik Musanif Nik Cob	0
–	MF	Nik Ahmad Fadly Nik Leh	1
–	MF	Tuan Kamree Tuan Yahya	3 (Note: 2 goals scored during Malaysia FA Cup competition.)
–	MF	Rezal Zambery Yahya	3 (Note: 1 goal scored during Malaysia Cup competition.)
–	FW	Fatrurazi Rozi	6
–	FW	Hardi Ahmad	10 (Note: 4 goals scored during Malaysia Cup competition.)
–	FW	Anuar Abu Bakar	9 (Note: 1 goal each scored during Malaysia FA Cup and Malaysia Cup competitions.)
–	FW	Wan Ahmad Ridzuan	0
–	FW	Nazreen Tee Abdullah	1
–	FW	Khairan Eroza Razali	0
–	FW	Mohd Hazly Zain	0
–	FW	Rushamazi Abdul Hamid	0

=== 2000 ===
No.	Pos.	Name	Goal
22	GK	Mohd. Ridzuan Bulat	0
23	GK	Mohd Shahrizan Ismail	0
5	–	Abu Sufian Hasan	0
16	DF	Akmal Tabrani	0
8	FW	Anuar Abu Bakar	16 (Note: 2 goals scored during Malaysia FA Cup and 1 goal during Malaysia Cup competitions.)
18	FW	Fatrurazi Rozi	1
12	DF	Azman Yusoff	0
11	MF	Safri Kassim	0
14	DF	Saifulnizam Hussein	1
25	MF	Nik Ahmad Fadly Nik Leh	5 (Note: 1 goal scored during Malaysia FA Cup competition.)
2	DF	Nik Mohamad Azuran Raja Abdullah	0
4	MF	Rosairil Asrul	0
3	DF	Rosmaini Ismail	0
21	DF	Sarudy Aziz	1
15	MF	Tengku Hazman Raja Hassan	3 (Note: 1 goal scored during Malaysia Cup competition.)
7	MF	Tengku Ismail Sabaruddin	0
9	FW	Zool Ihsan Yunus	17 (Note: 2 goals each scored during Malaysia FA Cup and Malaysia Cup competitions.)
6	–	Zulkarnain Mohamad	0
17	DF	Roslisham Nor	1
13	MF	Tuan Kamree Tuan Yahya	1
10	MF	Baharuddin Ali	1
24	MF	Nik Musanif Nik Cob	6 (Note: 1 goal scored during Malaysia Cup competition.)
19	FW	Hardi Ahmad	7 (Note: 2 goals scored during Malaysia FA Cup competition.)

=== 1999 ===
No.	Pos.	Name	Goal
1	GK	Azlan Ismail	0
3	DF	Sarudy Aziz	2 (Note: 1 goal scored during Malaysia FA Cup competition.)
4	DF	Saifulnizam Hussein	0
5	MF	Zahasmi Ismail	1
6	MF	Tan Cheng Hoe	6 (Note: 1 goal scored during Malaysia FA Cup competition.)
7	FW	Zainuddin Ariffin	2
8	–	Aqli Ahmad Tabrani	0
9	FW	Azman Shamsuddin	0
10	FW	Fuad Adam	0
11	FW	Nidzam Adha Yusoff	3 (Note: 1 goal scored during Malaysia FA Cup competition.)
12	MF	Mohamad Zaidi Napiah	0
13	MF	Rosairil Asrul Mat Nor	0
14	FW	Affendi Julaihi	4
15	FW	Azman Daud	0
16	DF	Akmal Ahmad Tabrani	0
17	DF	Roslisham Nor	6 (Note: 3 goals scored during Malaysia FA Cup competition.)
18	–	Amran Ghazali	0
19	FW	Adli Daud	0
20	DF	Khamal Idris Ali	2
21	FW	Yusrisyam Yusoff	2
22	GK	Halim Napi	0
23	GK	Mohd. Ridzuan Bulat	0
24	–	Zulkifli Abdullah	0
25	–	Zahariman Ghazali	0
–	FW	Hardi Ahmad	1
–	–	Norazuan Mohamad	0
–	FW	Fatrurazi Rozi	0
–	–	Yew Choh Hooi	0

=== 1998 ===
No.	Pos.	Name	Goal
–	MF	Mario Gomez	0
–	FW	Luis Pablo Pozzuto	0
–	FW	Mohd Hashim Mustapha	0
–	DF	Wan Rohaimi Wan Ismail	0
–	–	Robik Ismail	0
–	–	Badrisham Kadir	0
–	–	Alif Rohaimi Azizhan	0
–	–	Tuan Rosli Shaari	0
–	–	Sarudy Aziz	0
–	MF	Tuan Kamree Tuan Yahya	0
–	–	Mohd. Nazaruddin Mat Zain	0
–	DF	Zahasmi Ismail	0
–	DF	Mohd. Saifulnizam Hussin	0
–	DF	Azhar Aziz	0
–	DF	Zulkifli Abdullah	0
–	FW	Adamu Tigana	0
–	MF	Wah Kah Loon	0
–	–	Ghafor Mohamad	0
–	–	Mohd. Adnan Mohd. Zain	0
–	GK	Azuan Othman	0
–	GK	Wan Kamaruzaman Mohamad	0

== See also ==
- Kelantan FA

== 2017 season ==
=== Under-21s ===
As of 1 March 2017.

No.	Name	Nationality	Position	DOB
Goalkeepers
22	Ahmad Syihan Hazmi Mohamed (Captain)	(Malaysia)	GK	1996-02-22
28	Mohd Syafiq Zulkifli	(Malaysia)	GK	1997
29	Hasbullah Abdul Rahim	(Malaysia)	GK	1998-05-02
Defenders
2	Ahmad Azri Ahmad Azam	(Malaysia)	RB / RWB / RM	1997
3	Muhd Aminudin Zullkifli	(Malaysia)	CB	1997
4	Shahrul Al Azin Fauzi	(Malaysia)	LB / LWB	1997
5	Muhammad Azim Mohamed Shuburi	(Malaysia)	CB	1998
15	Mohd Nazrul Azmi	(Malaysia)	CB	1997
18	Muhd Muslim Kamaruddin	(Malaysia)	RB / CB	1996-03-20
23	Muhammad Azwan Aripin	(Malaysia)	LB / LWB	1996-04-21
24	Ahmad Bukhari Suhaimi	(Malaysia)	CB	1999
25	Wan Mohd Ridhwan Wan Deraman	(Malaysia)	CB	1997
30	Muhd Shahrul Nizam Ros Hasni	(Malaysia)	CB	1998-05-25
Midfielders
8	Nik Syamsul Aidil Azri Mat Jusoh	(Malaysia)	AM / CM	1996-02-19
13	Mohd Aiman Shakir Mohd Hashim	(Malaysia)	RM / RB	1997-10-16
14	Muhamad Izzad Muhamad	(Malaysia)	CM	1996
16	Nik Akif Syahiran Nik Mat	(Malaysia)	RW / RM	1999-05-11
17	Danial Ashraf Abdullah	(Malaysia)	AM / CM	1997-01-08
19	Muhammad Faiz Rosdi	(Malaysia)	LM / LB	1997
26	Muhamad Fadhilah Mohd Pauzi	(Malaysia)	CM	1996-04-23
27	Wan Alif Aiman Rosmaidi	(Malaysia)	AM / CM	1999-07-10
28	Muhammad Syaiful Alias	(Malaysia)	DM / CM	1999-02-04
Forwards
6	Muhd Raihan Mohd Huzaizi (Vice-captain)	(Malaysia)	ST	1996-11-05
7	Mohammad Imran Samso	(Malaysia)	ST	1998-05-19
10	Nik Azli Nik Alias	(Malaysia)	ST / LW	1997-01-26
11	Wan Muhammad Azam Mazlan	(Malaysia)	ST	1996
20	Remiefarizf Rashidy Zainudin	(Malaysia)	ST	1997

The Kelantan FA U21 team plays in the Piala Presiden and a number of local cup competitions.

=== Under-19s ===
As of 1 March 2017.

No.	Name	Nationality	Position	DOB
Goalkeepers
1	Muhd Aiman Mustaqim Hamzah	(Malaysia)	GK	1999-06-22
19	Mohd Fikri Che Soh (Captain)	(Malaysia)	GK	1998
21	Nik Mohd Amir Khusyairy Nik Mazlan	(Malaysia)	GK	1998-01-27
Defenders
2	Ahmad Azlyshah Azman	(Malaysia)	RB / CB	1999-12-02
23	Mohd Azzrie Aripin	(Malaysia)	RB / RWB	1998
24	Muhammad Wazir Mustapha	(Malaysia)	CB	1998
25	Ahmad Aidiel Ahmad Suhaimi	(Malaysia)	LB / LWB	2000
30	Ahmad Fathi Ifran Azlan	(Malaysia)	CB	1998-03-31
Midfielders
6	Muhammad Aliff Izuan Mohd Yusri	(Malaysia)	CM	2000
8	Muhammad Syafiq Syahmi Husin	(Malaysia)	AM / CM	1998-10-25
12	Muhamad Hafiezal Che Normizi	(Malaysia)	LW / LM	1998
13	Mohd Azroy Abdul Aziz	(Malaysia)	CM / LM	1998
18	Mohd Syazwan Mazlan	(Malaysia)	CM / DM	1998
14	Abdullah Al-Muizz Zura	(Malaysia)	RW / RM	1998
15	Ahmad Azraf Ahmad Azam	(Malaysia)	LW / LM	2000
22	Mohd Fazrul Amir Md Zaman	(Malaysia)	RW / RM	2000
27	Muhammad Aiman Naief Boskori	(Malaysia)	DM / CM	1999-01-03
28	Mohamad Fahmi Sabri	(Malaysia)	CM	1999-11-08
29	Mohd Farisfathullah Mohd Azam	(Malaysia)	CM	1998-08-20
Forwards
7	Afiq Saluddin	(Malaysia)	ST	1998-06-21
10	Mohd Danial Haqim Deraman	(Malaysia)	ST	1998-08-29
11	Mohd Ramani Nabil Roslan	(Malaysia)	ST	1998
16	Muhammad Juzaerul Jasmi	(Malaysia)	ST	2000
17	Mohamad Luqman Abdullah	(Malaysia)	ST	1999
26	Ahmad Zulfadhli Abdul Aziz	(Malaysia)	ST	1998

The Kelantan FA U19 team plays in the Piala Belia and a number of local cup competitions.

=== Staff ===
- U21s Head Coach: Mohd Hashim Mustapha
- U21s Assistant Coach: Zahariman Ghazali
- U21s Manager: Wan Rakemi Wan Zahari
- U21s Assistant Manager: Che Rastum Che Mood
- U21s Physiotherapist: Ahmad Faris Musa
- U21s Goalkeeping Coach: Mohd Halim Bin Napi
- U21s Security Officer: Normizal Ismail
- U21s Media Officer: Ab Ghainizan Ab Bakar
- U21s Kitman: Jusoh Jenal
- U21s Team Coordinator: Ghazali Husin
- U19s Head Coach: Sazami Shafi'i
- U19s Assistant Coach: Nik Ahmad Fadly Nik Leh
- U19s Manager: Datuk Seri Amril Aiman Abdul Aziz
- U19s Assistant Manager: Mohamad Danish Aklil Bin Azlan
- U19s Assistant Manager: Ahmad Faizal Husain
- U19s Goalkeeping Coach: Mohd Azam Othman
- U19s Media Officer: Fazuny Mohd Noor
- U19s Kitman: Noor Azmi Mohd Nor
- U19s Team Coordinator: Ahmad Faizal Husain
