= 2013 Kelantan FA season =

Kelantan
2013 season
- Manager: Azman Ibrahim
- Head Coach: Bojan Hodak
- Stadium: Sultan Muhammad IV Stadium
- Super League: 4th
- FA Cup: Champions
- Malaysia Cup: Runners-up
- Community Shield: Runners-up
- AFC Cup: Round of 16
- Top goalscorer: League: Mohd Nor Farhan Muhammad (6); Indra Putra Mahayuddin (6); Mohd Badhri Mohd Radzi (6); All: Mohd Badhri Mohd Radzi (16)
- Highest home attendance: 30,000 vs Johor Darul Takzim (5 October 2013)
- Lowest home attendance: 5,000 vs T-Team (7 April 2013)
- Average home league attendance: 12,500
Home colours	Away colours

The 2013 season was Kelantan's 5th season in the Malaysia Super League. They were defending Malaysia Super League champions and aimed for 3rd league title this season. Furthermore, they were competing in the AFC Cup for the second consecutive seasons. In addition, they were competing in the domestic tournaments, the FA Cup and the Malaysia Cup as the last season's runners-up and defending champion respectively.

After a very successful 2012 season, winning a treble for the first time in their history, Kelantan started the season with busy pre-season player transfer activities. They already announce their sponsors for the 2013 season as well as presenting the new kits on 3 January 2013.

== Pre-season and friendlies ==
Date	Opponents	H / A	Result F–A	Scorers	Attendance
28 November 2012	(Australia) Palm Beach	A	3–0	Khairul Izuan Rosli, Aris Zaidi, Farhan	
7 December 2012	(Malaysia) Perlis	H	5—0	Mandjou 5', 42', Farhan 49', Petratos 87', Haris Safwan 89'	25,000
12 December 2012	(Malaysia) Kedah	H	4—1	Sabree Mat Abu (O.g), Farhan, Petratos, Mandjou	
16 December 2012	Brunei DPMM	A	1—1	Petratos 75'	
17 December 2012	(Indonesia) Semen Padang	A	2—4	Badhri Radzi 26', Petratos 64'	
24 December 2012	(Malaysia) Penang	A	4—0	Petratos 22', 32', Haris Safwan 37', Mandjou 72'	5,000
26 December 2012	(Malaysia) Kedah	A	0—0		
30 December 2012	(Malaysia) Sime Darby	A	1—4	Mandjou	
2 February 2013	(Indonesia) Semen Padang	H	1—1	Petratos 60'	7,000
7 February 2013	(Malaysia) FELDA United	H	2—0	Salim Arrache 33', Indra Putra 72'	7,000

== Community Shield ==
The Sultan Haji Ahmad Shah Cup, more popularly known as Piala Sumbangsih (Charity Shield), is an annual soccer match currently contested by the current Malaysia Cup winner and the current Super League Malaysia winner. Since both trophies were won by Kelantan, FAM has decided that ATM as last season's Malaysia Cup runner-up to face Kelantan.

The match was played at Shah Alam Stadium on 5 January 2013, with kick-off at 8.45pm.

A deflected shot from Indra Putra gave Kelantan the lead in the 58th minute while a curled free kick taken by Irwan Fadzli Idrus five minutes from time cancelled the advantage. The match went straight to the penalty shoot-out and Kelantan failed by 2 shots; one from Rizal Fahmi which was saved by ATM keeper Farizal Harun and shot from Daudsu Jamaluddin hit the bar.

Date	Opponents	H / A	Result F–A	Scorers	Attendance
5 January 2013	(Malaysia) ATM	N	1–1 (3–4 p)	Indra Putra 58'	

== Super League ==
The fixtures for the 2012–13 season were announced on 10 December 2012. The league is set to start on 8 January 2013.

Kelantan started a bit nervy when the out-muscled PKNS in the very last minute on their first league match. Kelantan win 2–1 from goals from captain Badhri Radzi in 18th minute and Zairul Fitri's injury time header.

Date	Opponents	H / A	Result F–A	Scorers	Attendance	League position
9 January 2013	(Malaysia) (Selangor) PKNS	H	2—1	Badhri Radzi 18', Zairul Fitree 90'	10,000	2nd
12 January 2013	(Malaysia) (Terengganu) T-Team	A	0—1			▼5th
15 January 2013	(Malaysia) Johor Darul Takzim	H	1—1	Farhan 37'		▼6th
19 January 2013	(Malaysia) FELDA United	A	0—0			▼8th
22 January 2013	(Malaysia) Negeri Sembilan FA	H	0—0			▲7th
16 February 2013	(Malaysia) Selangor	A	0—2			▼8th
19 February 2013	(Malaysia) Terengganu	H	2—0	Mandjou 33', 64'	15,000	8th
23 February 2013	(Malaysia) Pahang	A	2—2	Farhan 7', Mandjou 84'	39,955	8th
1 March 2013	(Malaysia) Perak	H	1—1	Mandjou 88'		▲6th
9 March 2013	(Singapore) Lions XII	A	0—1			▼8th
29 March 2013	(Malaysia) ATM	A	3—2	Indra Putra 28', Mandjou 33', Farhan 90'		▲7th
13 April 2013	(Malaysia) ATM	H	1—3	Faiz Subri 39'		▼8th
19 April 2013	(Malaysia) (Selangor) PKNS	A	1—2	Fakri 7'		▼9th
27 April 2013	(Malaysia) (Terengganu) T-Team	H	3—1	Nwakaeme 36' (pen.), Farhan 65', Indra Putra 90'	5,000	9th
22 May 2013 (Note: The original match-day is on 4 May which was postponed due to Malaysia's 13th general election to be held on 5 May 2013.)	(Malaysia) Johor Darul Takzim	A	0—2		30,000	▼7th
7 May 2013	(Malaysia) FELDA United	H	3—0	Indra Putra 30', 35', Badhri Radzi 90+1'	18,000	▲8th
10 May 2013	(Malaysia) Negeri Sembilan	A	3—0	Badhri Radzi 32', Indra Putra 75', Farhan 81'	4,000	▲6th
18 May 2013	(Malaysia) Selangor	H	1—1	Zairo Anuar 65'	15,000	6th
21 June 2013	(Malaysia) Terengganu	A	4—0	Badhri Radzi 12', Nwakaeme 47', Farhan 50', Faiz Subri 56'	8,500	6th
25 June 2013	(Malaysia) Pahang	H	2—0	Badhri Radzi 45+1', Zamri Ramli 56'		▲5th
2 July 2013	(Malaysia) Perak	A	1—0	Indra Putra 80'	25,000	5th
6 July 2013	(Singapore) Lions XII	H	2—0	Badhri Radzi 5', Nwakaeme 58'		▲4th

=== League table ===
Pos	Team	Pld	W	D	L	GF	GA	GD	Pts	Qualification or relegation
2	Selangor	22	10	10	2	31	17	+14	40	2014 AFC Cup group stage
3	Johor Darul Ta'zim	22	11	7	4	32	26	+6	40	
4	Kelantan	22	10	6	6	32	20	+12	36	2014 AFC Cup group stage (Note: Qualified as 2013 Piala FA winners)
5	Pahang	22	10	5	7	36	32	+4	35	
6	ATM	22	10	4	8	35	25	+10	34	

Source: RSSSF
Rules for classification: 1) points; 2) goal difference; 3) number of goals scored

== FA Cup ==
Having finished as the champion of the FA Cup last season, Kelantan will begin their FA Cup campaign in the second round, having given a bye in the first round. The draw for the FA Cup's first and subsequent rounds was held on 10 December 2012 at Grand BlueWave Hotel, Shah Alam, Selangor. Kelantan will play against the winner of the first round match between PKNS and Lions XI.

Kelantan won the two-legged semi-finals to advance into the third consecutive FA Cup finals after beating Terengganu 6–5 on aggregate. They beat Johor Darul Takzim 1–0 during final on 29 June 2013 at National Stadium, Bukit Jalil, Kuala Lumpur.

Date	Opponents	H / A	Result F–A	Scorers	Attendance	Referee
25 March 2013 (Note: The original match on 26 February 2013 was postponed due to flooded field.)	(Malaysia) (Selangor) PKNS	H	4—2	Faiz Subri 4', Badhri Radzi 7', Nwaneri 23' (pen.), Helmi Remeli 32' (o.g)	20,000	
6 April 2013	(Malaysia) Sarawak	H	2—1	Faiz Subri 7', Khairul Izuan 20'	14,000	Mohd Zamzaidi Katimin
16 April 2013	(Malaysia) Sarawak	A	2—0	Indra Putra 19', Farhan 31'	15,000	Nagor Amir Noor Mohamed
25 May 2013	(Malaysia) Terengganu	H	4—1	Nwakaeme 80', Indra Putra 89', Nwaneri 90+1 (pen.), Zairo Anuar 90+3'	20,000	Nagor Amir Noor Mohamed
28 May 2013	(Malaysia) Terengganu	A	2—4*	Nwaneri 90+5', Nwakaeme 119'	8,500	Suhaizi Shukri (Melaka)
29 June 2013	(Malaysia) Johor Darul Takzim	N	1—0	Farhan 15'	100,100	Syed Azhar Syed Kamar (Kuala Lumpur)

== Malaysia Cup ==
=== Group stage ===
Date	Opponents	H / A	Result F–A	Scorers	Attendance	Referee	Group ranking
20 August 2013	(Malaysia) Pahang	A	1—1	Badhri Radzi 9'	22,000	Nagor Amir	2nd
24 August 2013	(Malaysia) Terengganu	H	2—0	Dickson Nwakaeme 11', Zairo Anuar 73'	15,000	Nafeez	2nd
27 August 2013	(Malaysia) Negeri Sembilan	A	1—1	Dickson Nwakaeme 41'			2nd
31 August 2013	(Malaysia) Negeri Sembilan	H	2—3	Indra Putra 37', Fakri Saarani 49'			▼3rd
17 September 2013	(Malaysia) Terengganu	A	3—1	Hasmizan 28' (o.g.), Indra Putra 57', Badhri Radzi 86'			▲2nd
21 September 2013	(Malaysia) Pahang	H	4—0	Indra Putra 20', Dickson Nwakaeme 70', 76', 82'			▲1st

=== Knockout stage ===
Date	Opponents	H / A	Result F–A	Scorers	Attendance	Referee
28 September 2013	(Malaysia) Johor Darul Takzim	A	4—2	Indra Putra 23', Obinna Nwaneri 48'	30,000	
4 October 2013	(Malaysia) Johor Darul Takzim	H	6—1	Farhan 19', 62', Badhri Radzi 32', Obinna Nwaneri 44', Dickson Nwakaeme 46', Indra Putra 89'	30,000	

Kelantan won 8–5 on aggregate.

=== Semi-finals ===
Date	Opponents	H / A	Result F–A	Scorers	Attendance	Referee
19 October 2013	(Malaysia) ATM	A	2—1	Badhri Radzi 15, Nor Farhan 78'	10,400	Nagor Amir Noor Mohamed
26 October 2013	(Malaysia) ATM	H	2—2	Fakri Saarani 81', Badhri Radzi 83'	22,000	Nafeez Abdul Wahab

Kelantan won 4–3 on aggregate.

=== Final ===
Date	Opponents	H / A	Result F–A	Scorers	Attendance	Referee
3 November 2013	Pahang	N	0—1		85,000	Nagor Amir

== AFC Cup ==
=== Group stage ===
Having finished in the top of Super League last season, Kelantan will begin their AFC Cup campaign in the group stage. The draw for the qualifying play-off was held on 6 December 2012 in Kuala Lumpur.

Date	Opponents	H / A	Result F–A	Scorers	Attendance	Group ranking
6 March 2013	(Maldives) Maziya	H	1—1	Badhri Radzi 76'	12,000	2nd
13 March 2013	(Myanmar) Ayeyawady United	A	3—1	Badhri Radzi 2', Petratos 53', 80'	600	2nd
2 April 2013	(Vietnam) SHB Đà Nẵng	H	5—0	Nwakaeme 4', Indra Putra 7', Faiz Subri 23', Petratos 59', Badhri Radzi 85'	10,000	▲1st
10 April 2013	(Vietnam) SHB Đà Nẵng	A	1—0	Nwakaeme 73'	12,700	1st
23 April 2013	(Maldives) Maziya	A	1—6	Haris Safwan 7'	2,400	1st
30 April 2013	(Myanmar) Ayeyawady United	H	3—1	Nwaneri 43', Nik Shahrul 70', Badhri Radzi 84'	14,200	1st

=== Knockout stage ===
Kelantan advanced to the round of 16 after leading group G with 13 points, 1 point ahead of SHB Đà Nẵng. The matches for the round of 16 are decided prior to the group stage, with the winners of one group, which host the match, playing the runners-up of another group in the same zone.

Datej	Opponents	H / A	Result F–A	Scorers	Attendance
14 May 2013	(Hong Kong) Kitchee	H	0—2		15,000

== Squad statistics ==
Kelantan FA has announced 2013 AFC Cup squad on 15 December 2012.

(Compiled from match statistics in Stadium Astro website. MSL GW 1, MSL GW 2, MSL GW 3, MSL GW 4, MSL GW 5, MSL GW 6, MSL GW 7, MSL GW 8, MSL GW 9, AFC Cup MD 1, MSL GW 10, AFC Cup MD 2, MSL GW 11, AFC Cup MD 3, AFC Cup MD 4, MSL GW 12, MSL GW 13, AFC Cup MD 5, MSL GW 14, AFC Cup MD 6, MSL GW 15, MSL GW 16)

No.	Pos.	Name	Super League		FA Cup		Malaysia Cup		Charity Shield		AFC Cup		Total		Discipline	
No.	Pos.	Name	Apps	Goals	Apps	Goals	Apps	Goals	Apps	Goals	Apps	Goals	Apps	Goals	Yellow card	Red card
1	GK	(Malaysia) (Kelantan) Mohd Shahrizan Ismail	0(1)	0	0	0	0	0	0	0	0	0	0(1)	0	0	0
2	DF	(Malaysia) (Perlis) Azizi Matt Rose	6(7)	0	0	0	0	0	0	0	1(1)	0	5(3)	0	0	0
3	DF	(Malaysia) (Perak) K. Nanthakumar^{1}	2(19)	0	0	0	0	0	0(1)	0	2(1)	0	4(5)	0	0	0
4	DF	(Nigeria) Obinna Nwaneri*	19	0	6	3	3	0	1	0	5	1	34	4	6	0
5	DF	(Malaysia) (Kelantan) Nik Shahrul Azim Abdul Halim	16	0	2	0	0	0	1	0	5(1)	1	22(1)	1	6	0
6	DF	(Malaysia) (Kelantan) Mohd Farisham Ismail	3(6)	0	1	0	0	0	0	0	1(2)	0	2(5)	0	2	0
7	MF	(Malaysia) (Terengganu) Zairo Anuar Zalani	4(10)	1	0	0	0	0	1	0	2(1)	0	6(3)	0	0	0
8	MF	(Malaysia) (Kelantan) Mohd Shakir Shaari (Vice captain)	13	0	2	0	0	0	1	0	5	0	21	0	4	1
9	FW	(Malaysia) (Terengganu) Mohd Haris Safwan Mohd Kamal^{2}	6(3)	0	0	0	0	0	0	0	2(1)	1	8(4)	1	2	0
10	MF	(Malaysia) (Terengganu) Mohd Nor Farhan Muhammad	14(6)	6	1(1)	1	0	0	1	0	3(1)	0	19(8)	7	3	0
11	DF	(Malaysia) (Kelantan) Mohammad Abdul Aziz Ismail^{3}	0	0	0	0	0	0	0	0	0	0	0	0	0	0
12	MF	(Malaysia) (Kelantan) Muhd Izuan Salahuddin	0(12)	0	0	0	0	0	0	0	1(2)	0	1(14)	0	0	0
13	MF	(Malaysia) (Kedah) Mohd Faiz Subri	13(5)	2	3	2	0	0	0	0	3(1)	1	19(6)	4	0	0
14	DF	(Malaysia) (Kelantan) Mohd Zamri Ramli	5(11)	1	0(1)	0	0	0	0(1)	0	2(1)	0	7(14)	0	3	1
15	DF	(Malaysia) (Kelantan) Mohd Daudsu Jamaluddin	16(1)	0	1	0	0	0	1	0	2(1)	0	20(2)	0	4	0
16	MF	(Malaysia) (Kelantan) Mohd Badhri Mohd Radzi (Captain)	19(3)	6	1	1	0	0	1	0	3(2)	4	24(5)	12	1	0
17	DF	(Malaysia) (Kelantan) Mohd Rizal Fahmi Abdul Rosid	6(12)	0	0(1)	0	0	0	1	0	1	0	8(13)	0	1	0
18	MF	(Malaysia) (Kelantan) Mohd Khairul Izuan Rosli	6(11)	0	1	0	0	0	0	0	2	0	9(11)	0	3	0
19	GK	(Malaysia) (Kelantan) Khairul Fahmi Che Mat*	22	0	6	0	3	0	0	0	7	0	38	0	0	0
20	FW	(Guinea) Keita Mandjou^{4}	8(1)	5	1	0	0	0	1	0	0	0	10(1)	5	1	0
21	GK	(Malaysia) (Kelantan) Norhadi Ubaidillah	0	0	0	0	0	0	0	0	0	0	0	0	0	0
22	DF	(Malaysia) (Kelantan) Tuan Muhamad Faim Tuan Zainal Abidin^{5}	0	0	0	0	0	0	0	0	0	0	0	0	0	0
23	MF	(Malaysia) (Perak) Indra Putra Mahayuddin (Vice captain)	17(4)	6	1	1	0	0	1	1	2(3)	1	21(7)	8	3	0
24	DF	(Malaysia) (Kelantan) Zairul Fitree Ishak	17(2)	1	2	0	0	0	0	0	3	0	22(2)	1	1	0
-	FW	(Malaysia) (Kelantan) Mohamad Aris Zaidi^{6}	0(3)	0	0	0	0	0	0	0	0	0	0(3)	0	0	0
26	FW	(Australia) Dimitri Petratos^{7}	0	0	0	0	0	0	0	0	6	4	6	4	0	0
27	DF	(Croatia) Lek Kcira	0	0	0	0	0	0	0	0	6	0	6	0	0	0
28	DF	(Malaysia) (Kuala Lumpur) S. Subramaniam	0	0	0	0	0	0	0	0	0	0	0	0	0	0
29	GK	(Malaysia) (Kelantan) Muhammad Syazwan Yusoff*	0(20)	0	0	0	0	0	1	0	0	0	1(20)	0	0	0
20	FW	(Nigeria) Dickson Nwakaeme*	6(3)	3	3	2	3	2	0	0	4	2	16(3)	9	1	0
9	FW	(Malaysia) (Kelantan) Ahmad Fakri Saarani	10(1)	1	1	0	1	0	0	0	0	0	11(1)	1	2	1

- ^{1} Wears jersey no. 28 in 2013 AFC squad, while no. 3 in 2013 AFC squad is for Mohammad Abdul Aziz Ismail.
- ^{2} Wears jersey no. 22 in 2013 AFC squad, while no. 9 in 2013 AFC squad is for Keita Mandjou.
- ^{3} Wears jersey no. 3 in 2013 AFC squad, while no. 11 in 2013 AFC squad is for Dimitri Petratos.
- ^{5} Wears jersey no. 25 in 2013 AFC squad, while no. 22 in 2013 AFC squad is for Mohd Haris Safwan Mohd Kamal.
- ^{6} Wears jersey no. 20 in 2013 AFC squad, while no. 25 in 2013 AFC squad is for Tuan Muhamad Faim Tuan Zainal Abidin.
- ^{7} Wears jersey no. 11 in 2013 AFC squad, while no. 26 in 2013 AFC squad is for K. Nanthakumar.

== Top scorers ==
Rank	Player	League	Charity Shield	FA Cup	Malaysia Cup	AFC Cup	Total
1	(Malaysia) (Kelantan) Badhri Radzi	6	0	1	5	4	16
2	(Malaysia) (Perak) Indra Putra Mahayuddin	6	1	2	4	1	14
3	(Nigeria) Dickson Nwakaeme	3	0	2	6	2	13
4	(Malaysia) (Terengganu) Nor Farhan Muhammad	6	0	2	3	0	11
5	(Nigeria) Obinna Nwaneri	0	0	3	3	1	7
6	(Guinea) Keita Mandjou	5	0	0	0	0	5
6	(Malaysia) (Kedah) Faiz Subri	2	0	2	0	1	5
8	(Australia) Dimitri Petratos	0	0	0	0	3	3
8	(Malaysia) Fakri Saarani	1	0	0	2	0	3
8	(Malaysia) Zairul Fitree Ishak	1	0	0	0	0	1
8	(Malaysia) Mohd Zamri Ramli	1	0	0	0	0	1
8	(Malaysia) Zairo Anuar Zalani	0	0	0	0	0	0
#	Own goals	1	0	0	0	0	0
Totals		32	1	12	23	12	?

*Last updated 27 October 2013.

== Transfers ==
All start dates are pending confirmation.

=== In ===
Date	Pos.	Name	From	Fee	Source
November 2012	DF	(Malaysia) (Perak) K. Nanthakumar	(Malaysia) Perak		
November 2012	MF	(Malaysia) (Kedah) Mohd Faiz Subri	(Malaysia) (Terengganu) T-Team		
November 2012	FW	(Malaysia) (Terengganu) Mohd Haris Safwan Mohd Kamal	(Malaysia) Johor Darul Takzim		
November 2012	MF	(Malaysia) (Kelantan) Muhd Izuan Salahuddin	(Malaysia) Harimau Muda A		
November 2012	MF	(Malaysia) (Terengganu) Zairo Anuar Zalani	(Malaysia) (Terengganu) T-Team		
December 2012	DF	(Croatia) Lek Kcira	(Iran) Shahin Bushehr		
February 2013	DF	(Nigeria) Dickson Nwakaeme	(Vietnam) Sông Lam Nghệ An		
March 2013	FW	(Malaysia) (Kelantan) Ahmad Fakri Saarani	(Portugal) Atlético S.C.		

=== Out ===
Date	Pos.	Name	To	Fee	Source
November 2012	DF	(Croatia) Mijo Dadic	(Indonesia) Pelita Bandung Raya		
November 2012	MF	(Malaysia) (Kelantan) Mohd Azlan Ismail	(Malaysia) Perak		
November 2012	MF	(Malaysia) (Kelantan) Mohd Nurul Azwan Roya	(Malaysia) Johor Darul Takzim		
November 2012	FW	(Malaysia) (Kelantan) Mohd Ramzul Zahini Adnan	(Malaysia) Selangor		
November 2012	MF	(Malaysia) (Kedah) S. Chanturu	(Malaysia) Perak		
November 2012	MF	(Lebanon) Zakaria Charara	(Lebanon) Nejmeh		
December 2012	FW	(Lebanon) Mohammed Ghaddar	(Malaysia) FELDA United		
December 2012	FW	(Malaysia) (Terengganu) Norshahrul Idlan Talaha	(Malaysia) Johor Darul Takzim		

=== Loans in ===
Date	Pos.	Name	From	Expiry	Source
December 2012	MF	(Australia) Dimitri Petratos	(Australia) Sydney FC	6 months loan	

=== Loans out ===
Date	Pos.	Name	To	Expiry	Source
December 2012	MF	(Ghana) Emmanuel Okine	(Malaysia) Perlis	Until the end of the 2013 season	
December 2012	FW	(Ghana) Denny Antwi	(Malaysia) Perlis	Until the end of the 2013 season	
December 2012	FW	(Malaysia) (Kelantan) Mohd Nizad Ayub	(Malaysia) PKNS	Until the end of the 2013 season	

== Club officials ==
=== Backroom staff ===
Position	Name
President	(Malaysia) Tan Sri Annuar Musa
Acting President	(Malaysia) Dato' Afandi Hamzah
Chairman	(Malaysia) Datuk Rosmadi Ismail
Manager	(Malaysia) Haji Azman Ibrahim
Assistant manager	(Malaysia) Wan Badri Wan Omar
Head coach	(Croatia) Bojan Hodak
Assistant head coach	(Malaysia) Zahasmi Ismail
Assistant coach	(Malaysia) Kamarudin Muhammad
Goalkeeping coach	(Malaysia) Ismail Chawalit Abu Bakar
Fitness coach	(Croatia) Miro Petric
Physiotherapist	(Malaysia) Mohd Zainudin Zakaria & Ahmad Faris Musa
President's Cup Head Coach	(Malaysia) Mohd Sideek Samsudin
President's Cup Assistant Coach	(Malaysia) Mohd Nafuzi Mohd Zain
President's Cup Goalkeeping Coach	(Malaysia) Mohd Halim Napi
President's Cup Fitness Coach	(Malaysia) Ghazali Hussin
President's Cup Physiotherapist	(Malaysia) Mohd Naim Mohd Sukri
U19 Head Coach	(Malaysia) Tengku Hazman Raja Hassan
U19 Assistant Coach	(Malaysia) Nik Ahmad Fadly Nik Leh
Media Officer	(Malaysia) Zuki Deraman
Security Officer	(Malaysia) Dato' Mohd Farek@Fared Abdul Ghani
Masseuse	(Malaysia) Mohamad Naim Mohamad Sukri
Kit man/Equipment	(Malaysia) Harun Ismail
General Secretary/Administrative Officer	(Malaysia) Haji Azman Ibrahim
Assistant Administrative Officer	(Malaysia) Kevin Ramalingam

== Sponsorship ==
=== Shirt sponsor ===
- Hotlink

=== Material manufacturer ===
- Warriors

=== Official sponsors ===
- AzizanOsman.com
- Adabi
- Mamee
- Sinar Harian
- Syarikat Muda Osman
- Trésenergy.com
- Desa Murni Batik
- Pure're Spritz
- Keropok Sira Cap Nara Pasir Puteh
- Wan Huzairil
- Yusri Maju Sdn. Bhd.
- Secretleaf
- Red Bull

== See also ==
- 2013 Malaysia Super League season
- List of Kelantan FA seasons
