= 2012 Kelantan FA season =

Kelantan
2012 season
- Chairman: Annuar Musa
- Manager: Azman Ibrahim
- Stadium: Sultan Muhammad IV Stadium, Kota Bharu (Capacity: 22,000)
- Super League: Champions
- FA Cup: Champions
- Malaysia Cup: Champions
- Charity Shield: Runners-up
- AFC Cup: Quarter-final
- Top goalscorer: League: (Lebanon) Mohammed Ghaddar (9); All: (Lebanon) Mohammed Ghaddar (21)
- Highest home attendance: 30,000 vs Terengganu FA (11 February 2012)
- Lowest home attendance: 5,000 vs PBDKT T-Team FC (14 April 2012)
- Average home league attendance: 21,250
Home colours	Away colours

The 2012 season was Kelantan's 4th season in the Malaysia Super League. Kelantan were defending Malaysia Super League champions and aimed for 2nd league title this season. Furthermore, they were competing in the AFC Cup for the first time. In addition, they were also competing in the domestic tournaments, the FA Cup and the Malaysia Cup.

== Competitions ==
=== Overview ===
Competition	First match	Last match	Starting round	Final position	Record							
Competition	First match	Last match	Starting round	Final position	Pld	W	D	L	GF	GA	GD	Win %
Malaysia Super League	10 January 2012	14 July 2012	Matchday 1	Winners	26	18	6	2	53	18	+35	69.23
Malaysia Charity Shield	7 January 2012		Final	Runners-up	1	0	0	1	1	2	−1	0.00
Malaysia FA Cup	18 February 2012	19 May 2012	Round of 32	Winners	7	5	2	0	14	6	+8	71.43
Malaysia Cup	22 August 2012	20 October 2012	Group stage	Winners	11	7	3	1	23	13	+10	63.64
AFC Cup	7 March 2012	25 September 2012	Group stage	Quarter-finals	9	5	2	2	15	13	+2	55.56
Total					54	35	13	6	106	52	+54	64.81

Last updated: 20 October 2012
Source: Competitions

Win Draw Loss Postponed Upcoming fixture

=== Charity Shield ===
The Sultan Haji Ahmad Shah Cup, more popularly known as Piala Sumbangsih (Charity Cup) is an annual soccer match currently contested by the current Malaysia Cup winner and the current Super League Malaysia winner.

The match was played at National Stadium, Bukit Jalil on 7 January 2012, with kick-off at 8.45pm.

Date	Opponents	H / A	Result F–A	Scorers	Attendance
7 January 2012	Negeri Sembilan FA	N	2 – 1	Norshahrul 22'	25,000

=== League ===
Week	Date	Opponents	H / A	Result F – A	Scorers	Attendance	League position
1	10 January 2012	LIONSXI	A	2 – 1	Norshahrul 44', Ghaddar 79'	8,000	3rd
2	13 January 2012	PKNS FC	H	1 – 1	Badri Radzi 71'	25,000	2nd
3	17 January 2012	Johor FC	H	2 – 0	Indra Putra 55', Norshahrul 71'	28,000	2nd
4	21 January 2012	Kedah FA	A	3 – 0	Ghaddar 35' (pen.), Norshahrul 71', Antwi 90+3'	30,000	1st
5	28 January 2012	Kuala Lumpur FA	H	3 – 0	Norshahrul 46', Badhri Radzi 72', Antwi 77'	25,000	1st
6	8 February 2012	Sabah FA	A	0 – 0		28,000	1st
7	11 February 2012	Terengganu FA	H	2 – 1	Norshahrul 37', Badhri Radzi 54'	30,000	1st
8	14 February 2012	Selangor FA	A	1 – 2	Subramaniam 90'	55,000	2nd
9	4 March 2012	N.Sembilan	H	2 – 1	Badhri Radzi 2', S. Chanturu 90+3'	19,000	1st
10	17 March 2012	Perak	A	2 – 0	Daudsu 10', Zairul Fitree 24'	27,000	1st
11	31 March 2012	Felda United	H	5 – 1	Nwoha 2', 45', Farhan 65', Indra Putra 66', Badhri Radzi 80'	20,000	1st
12	7 April 2012	Sarawak FA	A	1 – 1	Farhan 85'	20,000	2nd
13	14 April 2012	T-Team	H	2 – 0	Nurul Azwan 43'	5,000	1st
14	17 April 2012	T-Team	A	2 – 1	S. Chanturu 67', Ghaddar 88' (pen.)	5,000	1st
15	4 May 2012	LIONSXI	H	3 – 0	S. Chanturu 75', Farhan 77', Rizal Fahmi 90+2	15,000	1st
16	12 May 2012	PKNS FC	A	3 – 0	Norshahrul 27', Nwaneri 83', Ghaddar 87'	10,000	2nd
17	26 May 2012	Johor FC	A	0 – 0		2,000	2nd
18	16 June 2012	Kedah FA	H	2 – 1	Fazliata (o.g.) 45', Ghaddar 54'	18,000	2nd
19	19 June 2012	Kuala Lumpur FA	A	1 – 0	Ghaddar 60'	20,000	2nd
20	23 June 2012	Sabah FA	H	2 – 0	Rizal Fahmi 6', Indra Putra 90+3'	20,000	2nd
21	26 June 2012	Terengganu FA	A	2 – 2	Farhan 5', Badhri Radzi 20'		1st
22	29 June 2012	Selangor FA	H	1 – 0	Ghaddar 25'		1st
23	3 July 2012	N.Sembilan FA	A	3 – 2	Azlan Ismail 49', Ghaddar 66', Indra Putra 71'		1st
24	7 July 2012	Perak FA	H	6 – 0	Indra Putra 17', 30', 49', Ghaddar 19', Badhri Radzi 23', Nurul Azwan 39'		1st
25	10 July 2012	Felda United	A	0 – 1			1st
26	14 July 2012	Sarawak FA	H	3 – 1	Badhri Radzi 61', Farhan 65', 67'	10,000	1st

==== Results by match ====
Match	1	2	3	4	5	6	7	8	9	10	11	12	13	14	15	16	17	18	19	20	21	22	23	24	25	26
Ground	A	H	H	A	H	A	H	A	H	A	H	A	H	H	H	A	A	H	A	H	A	H	H	H	A	H
Result	W	D	W	W	W	D	W	L	W	W	W	D	D	W	W	W	D	W	W	W	D	W	W	W	L	W
Position	3	1	1	1	1	1	2	1	1	1	2	2	2	2	2	2	2	2	2	2	1	1	1	1	1	1

Source: Malaysia Super League
A = Away; H = Home; W = Win; D = Draw; L = Loss

==== League table ====
Pos	Team	Pld	W	D	L	GF	GA	GD	Pts	Qualification or relegation
1	Kelantan (C, Q)	26	18	6	2	53	18	+35	60	2013 AFC Cup group stage
2	LionsXII (Note: LionsXII are not eligible for any AFC competition spots)	26	15	5	6	48	23	+25	50	
3	Selangor (Q)	26	12	7	7	40	26	+14	43	2013 AFC Cup group stage (Note: Qualified as the next highest-placed local team behind Liga Super and 2012 Piala FA winners Kelantan.)
4	Perak	26	13	3	10	40	43	−3	42	
5	Terengganu	26	11	8	7	41	33	+8	41	

Source: RSSSF
Rules for classification: 1) points; 2) goal difference; 3) number of goals scored
(C) Champions; (Q) Qualified for the phase indicated

=== FA Cup ===
Round	Date	Opponents	H / A	Result F–A	Scorers	Attendance
Round of 32	18 February 2012	Sarawak FA	H	2—1	Indra Putra 34', Farhan 90+1'	30,000
Round of 16	10 March 2012	Kuala Lumpur FA	H	3—2	Farhan 30', Indra Putra 43', Badhri Radzi 70'	30,000
QF 1st leg	24 March 2012	SPA FC	A	3—0	Badhri Radzi 45', Farhan 53', 77	
QF 2nd leg	27 March 2012	SPA FC	H	2—0	Farhan 16', Onyekachi Nwoha 71'	
SF 1st leg	21 April 2012	Kedah FA	H	1—1	Norshahrul Idlan 17'	
SF 2nd leg	21 April 2012	Kedah FA	A	2—2	Nwaneri 47', Ghaddar 60'	30,000
Final	19 May 2012	Sime Darby FC	N	1—0	Ghaddar 59' (pen.)	85,000

=== Malaysia Cup ===
==== Group B ====
Pos	Team	Pld	W	D	L	GF	GA	GD	Pts
1	Kelantan FA (A)	6	3	2	1	13	8	+5	11
2	ATM FA (A)	6	3	2	1	12	8	+4	11
3	Kedah FA	6	1	3	2	6	8	−2	6
4	Terengganu FA	6	1	1	4	6	13	−7	4

(A) Advanced to knockout stage
Wednesday 22 August
20:45 UTC+08:00

Terengganu FA	2–0	Kelantan FA
Francis Doe 3'; Ismail Faruqi 89'

Sultan Ismail Nasiruddin Shah Stadium, Kuala Terengganu, Terengganu
Saturday 25 August
20:45 UTC+08:00

Kelantan FA	2–1	Kedah FA
Afiq Azmi 29' 45'		Khyril Muhymeen 4'

Sultan Muhammad IV Stadium, Kota Bharu, Kelantan
Tuesday 28 August
20:45 UTC+08:00

ATM FA	1–1	Kelantan FA
Marlon 55'		Obinna Nwaneri 87'

Majlis Perbandaran Selayang Stadium, Selayang, Selangor
Saturday 1 September
20:45 UTC+08:00

Kelantan FA	4–3	ATM FA
Afiq Azmi 7'; Norshahrul 28'; Farhan Mohamad 75'; Nurul Azwan 85'		Marlon 26' 35'; Hairuddin Omar 43'

Sultan Muhammad IV Stadium, Kota Bharu, Kelantan
Attendance: 25,000
Tuesday 4 September
20:45 UTC+08:00

Kedah FA	0–0	Kelantan FA

Darul Aman Stadium, Alor Setar, Kedah
Friday 14 September
20:45 UTC+08:00

Kelantan FA	6–1	Terengganu FA
Afiq Azmi 13'; Norfarhan Mohamad 29' 47'; Badhri Radzi 76' 81'; Indra Putra 86'		Hasmizan Kamarodin 79'

Sultan Muhammad IV Stadium, Kota Bharu, Kelantan

==== Knockout stage ====
Round	Date	Opponents	H / A	Result F–A	Scorers	Attendance
QF 1st leg	25 September 2012	Felda United	A	2—1	Nurul Azwan 56', Indra Putra 75'	
QF 2nd leg	2 October 2012	Felda United	H	2—2	Farhan 71', Mohammed Ghaddar 93'	
SF 1st leg	6 October 2012	Selangor FA	H	1—0	Farhan 62'	25,000
SF 2nd leg	12 October 2012	Selangor FA	A	2—0	Mohammed Ghaddar 85', Badhri Radzi 90+3'	

==== Final ====
The final was played on 20 October 2012 at the Shah Alam Stadium, Shah Alam in Selangor, Malaysia.

Saturday 20 October
20:45 UTC+08:00

ATM FA	2 – 3 (a.e.t.)	Kelantan FA
Rezal Zambery 49'; Marlon 62'		Norshahrul 44' 50'; Indra Putra 96'

Shah Alam Stadium, Selangor, Malaysia
Attendance: 80,925
Referee: Nafeez Abdul Wahab

== First team squad ==
No.	Name	Nationality	Position (s)	Date of Birth (Age)	Signed from
Goalkeepers
1	Mohd Shahrizan Ismail	(Malaysia)	GK	3 November 1979 (aged 32)	(Malaysia) Kelantan FA
29	Muhammad Syazwan Yusoff	(Malaysia)	GK	17 April 1992 (aged 20)	(Malaysia) Kelantan FA
Defenders
2	Azizi Matt Rose	(Malaysia)	CB	11 September 1981 (aged 31)	(Malaysia) PBDKT T-Team FC
3	S. Subramaniam	(Malaysia)	CB	31 August 1985 (aged 27)	(Malaysia) Kelantan FA
4	Obinna Nwaneri	(Nigeria)	CB	18 March 1982 (aged 30)	(Kuwait) Kazma Sporting Club
5	Nik Shahrul Azim Abdul Halim	(Malaysia)	RB / CB	2 October 1992 (aged 20)	(Malaysia) Kelantan FA
6	Mohd Farisham Ismail	(Malaysia)	CB	5 January 1985 (aged 27)	(Malaysia) Kelantan FA
11	Mohammad Abdul Aziz Ismail	(Malaysia)	LB / LM	12 November 1988 (aged 23)	(Malaysia) Kelantan FA
14	Mohd Zamri Ramli	(Malaysia)	LB, LM	23 November 1990 (aged 21)	(Malaysia) Kelantan FA
17	Mohd Rizal Fahmi Abdul Rosid	(Malaysia)	CB	1 May 1986 (aged 26)	(Malaysia) Kelantan FA
24	Zairul Fitree Ishak	(Malaysia)	LB	4 February 1985 (aged 27)	(Malaysia) Kelantan FA
25	Tuan Mohd Faim Tuan Zainal Abidin	(Malaysia)	CB	5 September 1992 (aged 20)	(Malaysia) Kelantan FA
Midfielders
18	Mohd Khairul Izuan Rosli	(Malaysia)	RM, RW, AM	6 December 1992 (aged 19)	(Malaysia) Kelantan FA
23	Suppiah Chanturu	(Malaysia)	RW / LW	14 December 1987 (aged 24)	(Malaysia) Kelantan FA
Forwards
7	Mohd Ramzul Zahini Adnan	(Malaysia)	ST	11 December 1987 (aged 24)	(Malaysia) Kelantan FA
22	Mohammed Ghaddar	(Lebanon)	ST	1 January 1984 (aged 28)	(Lebanon) Al-Jaish
25	Azlan Ismail	(Malaysia)	ST	3 October 1984 (aged 28)	(Malaysia) Kedah FA

== Statistics ==
=== Goalscoreres ===
As of 11 March 2017

Rank	Player	Super League	FA Cup	Malaysia Cup	AFC Cup	Community Shield	Total
1	(Lebanon) Mohammed Ghaddar	9	2	2	8	0	21
2	(Malaysia) Nor Farhan Muhammad	6	5	5	2	0	18
3	(Malaysia) Mohd Badhri Mohd Radzi	8	2	3	1	0	14
4	(Malaysia) Indra Putra Mahayuddin	7	2	3	1	0	13
5	(Malaysia) Norshahrul Idlan Talaha	6	1	3	0	1	11
6	(Nigeria) Onyekachi Nwoha	2	1	0	1	0	4
6	(Malaysia) Mohd Nurul Azwan Roya	2	0	2	0	0	4
6	(Malaysia) Mohd Afiq Azmi (on loan from Kuala Lumpur FA)	–	–	4	–	–	4
9	(Malaysia) S. Chanturu	3	0	0	0	0	3
9	(Malaysia) Rizal Fahmi Rosid	2	0	0	1	0	3
9	(Nigeria) Obinna Nwaneri	1	1	1	0	0	3
13	(Ghana) Denny Antwi	2	0	0	0	0	2
14	(Malaysia) S. Subramaniam	1	0	0	0	0	1
14	(Malaysia) Zairul Fitree Ishak	1	0	0	0	0	1
14	(Malaysia) Mohd Daudsu Jamaluddin	1	0	0	0	0	1
14	(Malaysia) Azlan Ismail	1	0	0	0	0	1
14	(Malaysia) Mohd Zamri Ramli	0	0	0	1	0	1
#	Own goals	1	0	0	0	0	1
Totals		53	14	23	15	1	106

Source: Competitions

== Transfers ==
All start dates are pending confirmation.

=== In ===
Pos.	Player	From
CB	(Malaysia) (Perlis) Azizi Matt Rose	(Terengganu) T-Team FC
RM	(Malaysia) (Perak) Indra Putra Mahayuddin	(Terengganu) T-Team FC
RW/LW	(Malaysia) (Terengganu) Mohd Nor Farhan Muhammad	(Terengganu) T-Team FC
FW	(Malaysia) (Kelantan) Azlan Ismail	Kedah FA
CB	(Nigeria) Obinna Nwaneri	(Kuwait) Kazma Sporting Club
DF	(Ghana) Emmanuel Okine	(Ghana) Great Olympics
DF	(Croatia) Mijo Dadić	(Indonesia) Deltras F.C.
RW/LW	(Lebanon) Zakaria Charara	(Cyprus) Ermis Aradippou
FW	(Guinea) Mandjou Keita	(India) Pune FC
FW	(Lebanon) Mohammed Ghaddar	(Lebanon) Al-Jaish
FW	(Nigeria) Onyekachi Nwoha	(United Arab Emirates) Fujairah SC
FW	(Ghana) Denny Antwi	(Ghana) SC Accra Hearts of Oak

=== Out ===
Pos.	Player	To
GK	(England) (Selangor) Syed Adney Syed Hussein	Sabah FA
MF	(Malaysia) (Kelantan) Khairan Eroza Razali	Pahang FA
MF	(Malaysia) (Kedah) Solehin Kanasian Abdullah	Selangor.FA
MF	(Malaysia) (Kelantan) Wan Zaman Wan Mustapha	(Kuala Lumpur) PDRM FA
MF	(Malaysia) (Kedah) Danial Fadzly Abdullah	(Kuala Lumpur) ATM FA
GK	(Malaysia) (Kelantan) Norhadi Ubaidillah	(Kuala Lumpur) UiTM FC
DF	(Malaysia) (Kelantan) Tuan Norhafiziee Mahmood	(Johor) Muar FC
MF	(Malaysia) (Kelantan) Syawal Rudin Abdul Rahim	(Johor) Muar FC
GK	(Malaysia) (Kelantan) Halim Napi	Retired
DF	(Malaysia) (Kelantan) Wan Rohaimi Wan Ismail	Released
MF	(Malaysia) (Kelantan) Zul Yusri Che Harun	Released
MF	(Malaysia) (Kuala Lumpur) Muhamad Khalid Jamlus	Released
MF	(Malaysia) (Kuala Lumpur) Nicholas Chan	Released

=== Loans in ===
Pos.	Name	From
DF	(Malaysia) (Sabah) Mafry Balang	Sabah FA
DF	(Malaysia) (Kuala Lumpur) Mohd Aslam Haja Najmudeen	Kuala Lumpur FA
FW	(Malaysia) (Perlis) Mohd Afiq Azmi	Kuala Lumpur FA

=== Loans out ===
Pos.	Name	To
MF	(Malaysia) (Kelantan) Muhd Izuan Salahuddin	(Malaysia) Harimau Muda A
MF	(Malaysia) (Kelantan) Khairan Ezuan Razali	(Kuala Lumpur) Felda United
FW	(Malaysia) (Kelantan) Mohd Nizad Ayub	(Kuala Lumpur) Felda United
MF	(Ghana) Emmanuel Okine	Kuala Lumpur FA
MF	(Lebanon) Zakaria Charara	Kuala Lumpur FA
FW	(Ghana) Denny Antwi	Kuala Lumpur FA

== See also ==
- List of Kelantan FA seasons
