= Mohammed Muyei =

Nigerien footballer

Personal information
- Full name: Mohammed Muyei
- Date of birth: February 7, 1975 (age 51)
- Place of birth: Niamey, Niger
- Position: Forward

Senior career*
Years	Team	Apps	(Gls)
2001–2003	Sekondi Hasaacas F.C.	43	(14)
2003–2005	Kelantan FA	47	(19)
2005–2007	Stade Malien	44	(16)
2007–2009	Asante Kotoko	39	(11)
2010–2011	New Edubiase United		

International career
2003–2006	Niger	2	(0)
- * Club domestic league appearances and goals as of January 27, 2007

Mohammed Muyei (born February 7, 1975, in Niamey) is a former Nigerien footballer who last played for New Edubiase United.

== Career ==
Muyei played from 2001 to 2003 for Sekondi Hasaacas F.C., in the past he played also for Kelantan FA (01.07.2003-01.01.2005) and later for Stade Malien (Bamako, Mali).

== International career ==
He is also a member of Niger national football team his 2 games played in the World Cup Qualification 2006 on 11 October and 14 November 2003 vs Algeria national football team.
