= Patricio Acevedo =

Chilean footballer (born 1978)

Personal information
- Full name: Patricio Iván Acevedo Muena
- Date of birth: 9 April 1978 (age 48)
- Place of birth: Santiago, Chile
- Height: 1.76 m (5 ft 9 1/2 in)
- Position: Midfielder

Senior career*
Years	Team	Apps	(Gls)
1996–2001	Universidad de Chile	16	(2)
1998	→ Rangers (loan)	8	(0)
1999	→ Everton (loan)	18	(1)
2002–2004	PSMS Medan		
2005	Deportes Antofagasta		
2006–2007	Kelantan FA		
2007–2008	Semen Padang		

International career
2006	Palestine	2	(0)
- * Club domestic league appearances and goals as of 19 March 2020

Patricio Iván Acevedo Muena (born 9 April 1978) is a Chilean-born Palestinian and former footballer. He has played for clubs in Chile, Malaysia and Indonesia.

== Honours ==
=== Club ===
Universidad de Chile

- Primera División de Chile (1): 2000
- Copa Chile (1): 2000
