= Mohd Afiq Azmi =

Malaysian footballer

Afiq Azmi
Personal information
- Full name: Muhammad Afiq bin Azmi
- Date of birth: 5 January 1989 (age 37)
- Place of birth: Kangar, Malaysia
- Height: 1.85 m (6 ft 1 in)
- Position: Forward

Team information
- Current team: V.I.P FC
- Number: 19

Youth career
- 2008: Perlis President's Cup Team

Senior career*
Years	Team	Apps	(Gls)
2009–2010	KSK Tambun Tulang		
2010–2012	Kuala Lumpur		
2012	→ Kelantan (loan)	9	(4)
2013–2015	Selangor	46	(21)
2016	NS Matrix	18	(4)
2017	Selangor	4	(0)
2018	Puchong Fuerza	8	(5)
2019	Penang	13	(1)
2020-present	Johor Darul Ta'zim	0	(0)
2022	→ BRM F.C (loan)	2	(1)

International career^{‡}
2015	Malaysia	3	(0)
- * Club domestic league appearances and goals as of August 3, 2020 ‡ National team caps and goals as of February 15, 2017

Muhammad Afiq bin Azmi (born 5 January 1989) is a Malaysian footballer who last plays as a forward for Penang in the Malaysia Premier League. He previously plays for KSK Tambun Tulang, Kuala Lumpur and Kelantan. He also represented Perlis state in Sukma Games XV edition (year 2012) in Pahang.

== Club career ==
Born in Kangar, Perlis, Afiq played two seasons for Kuala Lumpur and was the top scorer for his team. During his loan to Kelantan, he delivered outstanding performances in friendly matches before the 2012 Malaysia Cup campaign started. He scored a hat-trick and won 3–0 against Pattani and helped his team draw 1–1 against T-Team.

Afiq came in as a substitution against Terengganu replacing Badhri Radzi, but their team lost 0–2. On the second match, he scored 2 goals against Kedah. Afiq made his AFC Cup debut against Arbil. Afiq fail to score as Kelantan suffered a heavy defeat 5–1.

He had signed one-year contract with Selangor for 2013 Malaysia Super League. Later at the 2015 Malaysia Super League, he became the first local player to score a hat-trick in the 2015 Malaysia Super League and made the fastest hat-trick in the Malaysia Super League history which is within 15 minutes during a match against Singapore LionsXII on the 7th, 11th and 15th minute.

== Honours ==
=== Club ===
Kelantan

- Malaysia Cup : 2012

Selangor

- Malaysia Super League Runners-up: 2014
- Malaysia Cup : 2015
