= Fatrurazi Rozi =

Malaysian footballer

Personal information
- Full name: Fatrurazi bin Rozi
- Date of birth: 15 May 1978 (age 48)
- Place of birth: Rantau Panjang, Kelantan, Malaysia
- Height: 1.59 m (5 ft 2 1/2 in)
- Position: Striker

Team information
- Current team: Pos Malaysia FC
- Number: 9

Senior career*
Years	Team	Apps	(Gls)
2000–2003	Kelantan FA		(22)
2004–2005	Selangor Public Bank		(2)
2005–2006	Malacca FA		(5)
2006–2007	PDRM FA		(4)
2007–2009	PKNS FC		(7)
2009–2010	Felda United FC		(5)
2011	ATM FA	11	(2)
2012–	Pos Malaysia FC		
- * Club domestic league appearances and goals

Fatrurazi bin Rozi (born 15 May 1978) is a Malaysian footballer who is currently playing for Pos Malaysia FC in Malaysia Premier League.

He previously played for ATM FA, Felda United FC, Selangor Public Bank, Kelantan FA, Malacca FA, PKNS FC and PDRM FA.
