= Lek Kćira =

Croatian footballer

Personal information
- Date of birth: 28 January 1983 (age 43)
- Place of birth: Prizren, SFR Yugoslavia
- Height: 1.86 m (6 ft 1 in)
- Position: Centre-back

Senior career*
| Years | Team | Apps | (Gls) |
| 2002–2005 | Hrvatski Dragovoljac | | |
| 2006 | Górnik Łęczna | 6 | (0) |
| 2006–2007 | → Hrvatski Dragovoljac (loan) | | |
| 2007–2008 | Varteks | 2 | (0) |
| 2008–2009 | SK Tirana | 21 | (1) |
| 2009 | HNK Gorica | 3 | (0) |
| 2009–2010 | Steel Azin | 19 | (2) |
| 2010–2012 | Shahin Bushehr | 56 | (4) |
| 2013 | Kelantan | 0 | (0) |
| 2013 | HNK Gorica | 9 | (1) |
| 2014–2015 | Songkhla United | 0 | (0) |
| 2015 | HNK Gorica | 7 | (0) |
| 2015–2016 | Duhok | | |
| 2016 | Zagorec | | |
| 2016 | NK Međimurje | | |
| 2017- | ASKÖ Oberdorf | 94 | (8) |
- * Club domestic league appearances and goals as of 3 May 2016

Lek Kćira (born 28 January 1983) is a Croatian footballer who plays as central defender for ASKÖ Oberdorf in Austria.

== Career ==
=== Early career ===
Kćira played for Hrvatski Dragovoljac in Croatia in 2002. He then went on to play in Poland in 2005 with Górnik Łęczna. After a two-year spell in Poland he decided on a move back to his first club NK Hrvatski Dragovoljac. After one season he moved to NK Varteks in the top division, he played for the club for the first half of the 2007–2008 season.

=== KF Tirana ===
Kćira joined KF Tirana on 1 February 2008. During the rest of the 2007–08 campaign he became a first team regular and made 13 appearances scoring one goal. Kcira started the 2008–2009 season brightly but he only managed to play 8 league games due to injury.

=== Iranian clubs ===
After a short time in HNK Gorica, Kćira transferred to Iranian club Steel Azin enjoyed playon there by scoring 2 goals in 19 matches. On the next seasons, he moved to Shahin Bushehr to work with his past manager Hamid Estili.

=== Kelantan ===
Kćira signed one-year contract with Malaysia Super League team Kelantan for the 2013 season. He was the fourth foreign player for the team to play in the 2013 AFC Cup.

In 2016 he played for NK Međimurje in the Croatian league.

== Career statistics ==
As of 1 May 2013.

| Club | Season | League | | Cup | | League Cup | | Continental | | Total | |
| Club | Season | Apps | Goals | Apps | Goals | Apps | Goals | Apps | Goals | Apps | Goals |
|---|---|---|---|---|---|---|---|---|---|---|---|
| Steel Azin | 2009–10 | 19 | 2 | | | – | – | – | – | 19 | 2 |
| Total | | 19 | 2 | | | – | – | 0 | 0 | 19 | 2 |
| Shahin | 2010–11 | 28 | 1 | 1 | 0 | – | – | – | – | 29 | 1 |
| Shahin | 2011–12 | 28 | 3 | 4 | 0 | – | – | – | – | 32 | 3 |
| Total | | 56 | 4 | 5 | 0 | – | – | 0 | 0 | 61 | 4 |
| Kelantan | 2013 | 0 | 0 | 0 | 0 | 0 | 0 | 6 | 0 | 6 | 0 |
| Total | | 0 | 0 | 0 | 0 | 0 | 0 | 6 | 0 | 6 | 0 |
| Career total | | 76 | 6 | 5 | 0 | | | 6 | 0 | 86 | 6 |

== Honours ==
Shahin Bushehr

- Hazfi Cup runner-up: 2011–12
