= Mohamad Ghaddar =

Lebanese footballer (born 1984)

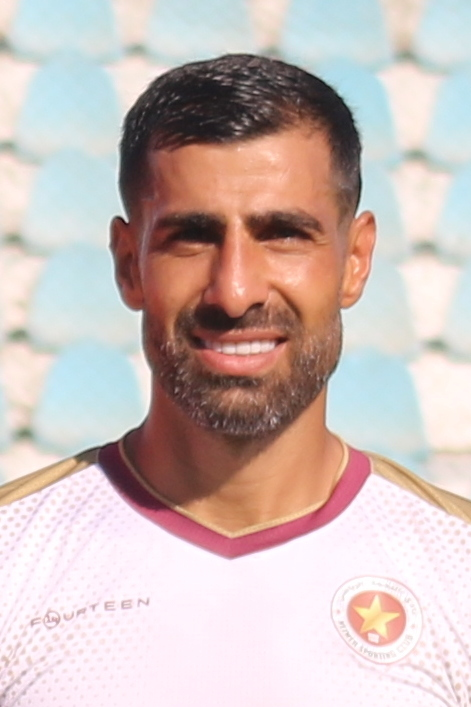
- Ghaddar with Nejmeh in 2021

Personal information
- Full name: Mohamad Mahmoud Ghaddar
- Date of birth: 1 January 1984 (age 42)
- Place of birth: Beirut, Lebanon
- Height: 1.81 m (5 ft 11 in)
- Position: Striker

Youth career
- 1998–2000: Nejmeh

Senior career*
Years	Team	Apps	(Gls)
2000–2009	Nejmeh		(52)
2009–2010	Al-Shabab	18	(5)
2010–2011	Al Ahly	4	(0)
2011	Tishreen	11	(5)
2011	Al-Jaish	6	(1)
2011–2013	Kelantan	17	(9)
2013	FELDA United	6	(2)
2013–2014	Kelantan	14	(4)
2014–2016	Naft Al-Wasat	12	(5)
2016	Tripoli	0	(0)
2016	Al-Faisaly	1	(1)
2017	Kelantan	11	(18)
2017	Johor Darul Ta'zim	10	(5)
2018	Kelantan	5	(1)
2019–2020	Johor Darul Ta'zim II	15	(7)
2020–2022	Nejmeh	19	(5)
Total		149+	(120)

International career
1999–2001	Lebanon U20		
2001–2004	Lebanon U23		
2006–2017	Lebanon	46	(19)
- * Club domestic league appearances and goals

Mohamad Mahmoud Ghaddar (Arabic: محمد محمود غدار; born 1 January 1984) is a Lebanese former professional footballer who played as a forward.

Coming through the youth system, Ghaddar began his senior career at Nejmeh in 2000. He stayed nine years at the club, winning multiple domestic and individual titles. In 2009, Ghaddar moved abroad, joining Al-Shabab in Bahrain, then Egyptian side Al Ahly in 2010, helping them win the league title. Following stints in Syria at Tishreen in 2010 and Al-Jaish in 2011, Ghaddar moved to Malaysia at Kelantan and FELDA United. He then returned to the Middle East, where he played for Al-Faisaly and Naft Al-Wasat between 2014 and 2017. Ghaddar returned to Kelantan, before moving to Johor Darul Ta'zim, winning the league as the top scorer. Following a second return to Kelantan and a stint at Johor Darul Ta'zim II, he returned to Nejmeh in Lebanon in 2020, where he retired two years later.

Ghaddar made his senior international debut for Lebanon in 2006. He represented his country in the 2010, 2014 and 2018 FIFA World Cup qualifiers, and the 2007, 2011, 2015 and 2019 AFC Asian Cup qualifiers. Ghaddar also took part in other competitions, namely the 2007 WAFF Championship, 2009 King's Cup and 2009 Nehru Cup. With 19 goals in 46 appearances, Ghaddar is Lebanon's third-highest goalscorer.

== Club career ==
=== Nejmeh ===
Ghaddar started his youth career at Nejmeh on 26 February 1998. After graduating from the youth academy he made his first-team debut two years later, and was a member of the squad that claimed the 1999–00 season title, which was the club's first Lebanese Premier League title for over 20 years. Over the course of the decade, Ghaddar went on to claim another four league titles and pick up successive league top-scorer awards, while cementing his reputation as one of Lebanon's finest strikers.

=== Al Shabab ===
In December 2009, Ghaddar signed for Bahraini Premier League side Al-Shabab for the 2009–10 season. On 18 March 2010, Ghaddar scored his first goal for Al-Shabab in a 3–1 win over Muharraq. Two weeks later, he scored a brace against Busaiteen in a 3–1 away win on 2 April. On 15 May, Ghaddar scored his second league brace in a 2–1 win against Malkiya. His five goals in six games at the end of the season helped the club avoid relegation to the second division.

=== Al Ahly ===
Ghaddar signed a four-year-contract with Egypt's Al Ahly for the 2010–11 Egyptian Premier League season, become the first Lebanese player to sign for the Egyptian team. Ghaddar debuted for Al Ahly on 6 August 2010, in a 0–0 draw with Ittihad El-Shorta where he was substituted onto the field for Mohamed Talaat after 76 minutes. He made an appearance during the 2010 CAF Champions League group stage on 12 September 2010, in a 2–1 win against Nigerian side Heartland where he was substituted onto the field for Mohamed Fadl in the 76th minute. Ghaddar was released by the club after just six months of his handful of appearances.

=== Syria ===
Ghaddar joined the Syrian club Tishreen for the 2010–11 season, but eventually joined Al-Jaish the same year.

=== Kelantan ===
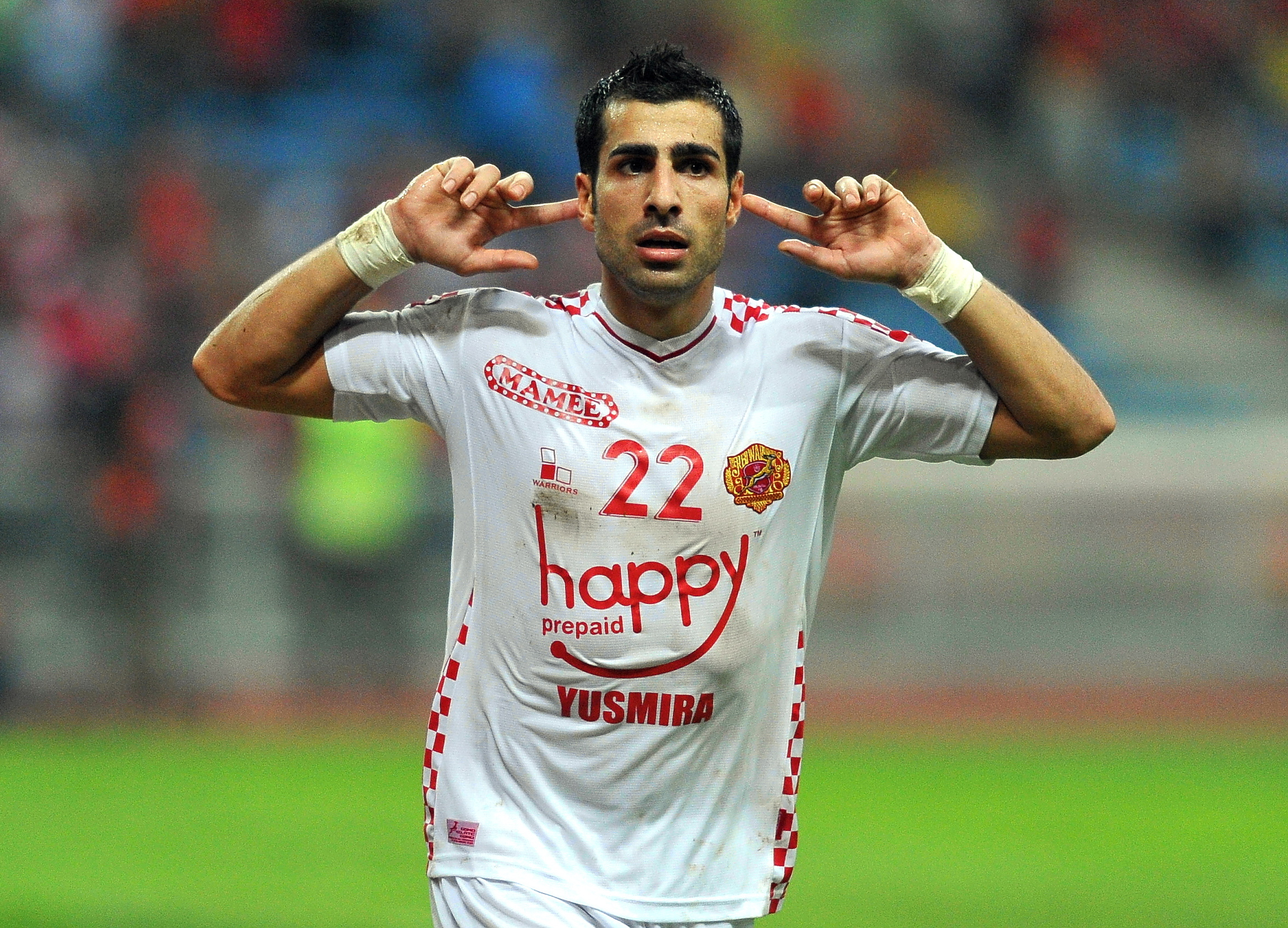
Ghaddar celebrating a goal with Kelantan in 2012

Ghaddar joined 2011 Malaysia Super League champions Kelantan FA on 8 November 2011, signing a two-year contract with the club. After his national team-duty, he officially joined Kelantan on 29 December 2011, scoring a 90th-minute penalty on his first appearance in a 3–1 win against Perak during a pre-season friendly match.

He started the season scoring three goals; however, he was deregistered from Kelantan's Super League squad in February, and replaced by Onyekachi Nwoha. After his impressive performance in the 2012 AFC Cup, scoring six times in four appearances, he was re-registered to the league squad in April, at the expense of Nwoha. He scored on his return to the Super League against PBDKT T-Team, through a penalty in a 2–1 win on 17 April 2012.

Ghaddar helped Kelantan win the Malaysia FA Cup for the first time, beating Sime Darby 1–0 in the final on 19 May 2012. He scored the only goal in the final, converting a penalty in the 58th minute.

=== FELDA United ===
After Ghaddar had refused to extend his contract with Kelantan, he signed a one-year contract with FELDA United. He scored a goal on his debut, which helped his club draw 1–1 against Terengganu in the opening match. In March 2013, Ghaddar experienced a back injury and was unable to play for his team; FELDA decided to replace him and signed a new foreigner player during the April transfer window.

=== Return to Kelantan ===
Ghaddar made a return to Malaysia Super League after signing a two-year contract with his former club, Kelantan. He scored a brace in his return against Selangor in the opening day of the 2014 season, which Kelantan won 2–1. On 23 April, his contract was terminated by Kelantan.

=== Naft Al Wasat ===
On 2 December 2014, Ghaddar joined Naft Al-Wasat in Iraq.

=== Second Return to Kelantan ===
Ghaddar re-signed for the third time with Kelantan after he was unveiled as one of their new import players on 15 January 2017. He scored two goals during his 2017 season debut against PKNS. Ghaddar scored 18 goals in 11 matches for Kelantan.

=== Johor Darul Ta'zim ===
After much speculation about his future, on 16 May 2017 Johor Darul Ta'zim announced that they had reached an agreement for the transfer of Ghaddar for an undisclosed fee. It was reported that Ghaddar had cost around RM 1,000,000 to RM 5,000,000 and he was reported to be paid from RM 170,000 to RM 200,000 monthly which will make him the highest wage receiver in Malaysia football history. Ghaddar made his debut for Johor Darul Ta'zim in a 1–0 win over PKNS, and provided the assist for the winning goal of the match on 24 May 2017.

Ghaddar scored his first goal for Johor Darul Ta'zim in a 2–0 home win over Penang on 1 July 2017. On 15 July 2017, Ghaddar scored two goals in five games as his club defeated Sarawak 3–1. He then scored another two goals on 22 July 2017 against T-Team and, on 26 July 2017, against Perak. Ghaddar concluded his season with five goals in 10 league appearances for Johor Darul Ta'zim.

In November 2017, Melaka United showed their interest in signing Ghaddar on a season-long move. On 22 November 2017, Ghaddar rejected Melaka United's offer. He was released from the club after the 2017 season.

=== Fourth return to Kelantan ===
On 12 February 2018, Ghaddar returned to Kelantan for a fourth time, before the transfer window closed on 11 February, replacing Morgaro Gomis who was reportedly injured. Ghaddar made his debut in 3–2 win over Perak on 24 February 2018, at Sultan Muhammad IV Stadium. After suffering from ACL injuries and a loss of form, his contract was terminated by mutual consent on May.

=== Johor Darul Ta'zim II ===
Ghaddar made his debut for Malaysian Premier League side Johor Darul Ta'zim II, the reserve team of Johor Darul Ta'zim, in 2–1 win over Sabah on 2 February 2019, scoring a header to equalise the game. Ghaddar scored seven goals in 15 league games.

=== Return to Nejmeh ===
On 7 September 2020, Ghaddar returned to Nejmeh in Lebanon. He retired in June 2022, at the end of the 2021–22 season, aged 38.

== International career ==
=== Youth ===
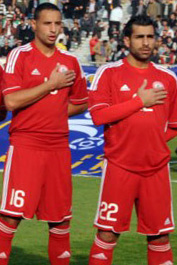
Ghaddar (right) lining up for Lebanon in a 2015 AFC Asian Cup qualification game against Iran

Ghaddar played for the Lebanon national under-20 football team alongside national teammates Ali El Atat and Ramez Dayoub.

During the qualification for the 2004 Summer Olympics, Ghaddar was part of the Lebanese under-23 team that made it to the final round of the Asian qualifiers.

=== Senior ===
On 8 September 2014, Ghaddar scored a goal against the Brazil Olympic team in a 2–2 draw.

On 12 June 2017, Ghaddar refused a call-up to the national team for a match against Malaysia, where he was playing his club football. He did not appear for the national team since.

== Controversies ==
=== League match controversy ===
On 12 June 2012, Mohd Amri Yahyah and Mohd Bunyamin Omar physically attacked Ghaddar in a Malaysian Super League match. During the game, Ghaddar was left in pain after Amri Yahyah unsportingly punched his private parts. Ghaddar took a few minutes to recover as he laid on the ground.

Following the incident, Selangor's Amri Yahyah and Bunyamin Omar were handed three-match suspensions and fined RM 1,500 each, while Ghaddar was handed a one-match suspension and fined RM 2,000 by the Disciplinary Committee of the Football Association of Malaysia.

=== Kelantan FA controversy ===
Ghaddar was brought to the disciplinary committee of Kelantan FA after he failed to report to the team on 5 August 2012, for their 2012 Malaysia Cup campaign that would begin on 22 August. He arrived on 16 August, after he had returned to Lebanon to get married after the 2012 Malaysia Super League season ended on 14 July 2012.

== Career statistics ==
=== Club ===
As of match played 2 May 2018

Appearances and goals by club, season and competition
Club	Season	League			National Cup		League Cup		Continental		Total	
Club	Season	Division	Apps	Goals	Apps	Goals	Apps	Goals	Apps	Goals	Apps	Goals
Kelantan	2012	Malaysia Super League	22	9	5	2	9	2	9	8	45	21
Kelantan	2013	Malaysia Super League	10	4	5	2	0	0	—		15	6
Kelantan	Total		32	13	10	4	9	2	9	8	60	27
FELDA United	2013	Malaysia Super League	7	3	0	0	0	0	0	0	7	3
Kelantan	2014	Malaysia Super League	14	4	5	1	7	0	—		26	5
Al-Faisaly	2014–15	Jordan Premier League	0	0	0	0	0	0	0	0	0	0
Naft Al-Wasat	2015–16	Iraqi Premier League	12	5	0	0	0	0	0	0	12	5
Al-Faisaly	2016–17	Jordan Premier League	1	1	0	0	0	0	0	0	1	1
Kelantan	2017	Malaysia Super League	11	18	1	0	0	0	—		12	18
Johor Darul Ta'zim	2017	Malaysia Super League	10	5	0	0	6	6	0	0	16	11
Kelantan	2018	Malaysia Super League	5	1	2	1	0	0	0	0	7	2
Career total			92	50	18	6	22	8	16	8	141	72

=== International ===
Appearances and goals by national team and year
National team	Year	Apps	Goals
Lebanon	2006	5	3
Lebanon	2007	3	4
Lebanon	2008	10	4
Lebanon	2009	5	0
Lebanon	2010	0	0
Lebanon	2011	5	2
Lebanon	2012	2	1
Lebanon	2013	6	1
Lebanon	2014	3	1
Lebanon	2015	6	2
Lebanon	2016	0	0
Lebanon	2017	1	1
Total		46	19

Scores and results list Lebanon's goal tally first, score column indicates score after each Ghaddar goal.

List of international goals scored by Mohamad Ghaddar
Goal	Date	Venue	Opponent	Score	Result	Competition
1	27 January 2006	Prince Faisal bin Fahd Stadium, Riyadh, Saudi Arabia	Saudi Arabia	1–0	2–1	Friendly
2	24 December 2006	Camille Chamoun Sports City Stadium, Beirut, Lebanon	Somalia	1–0	4–0	2009 Arab Nations Cup qualification
3	24 December 2006	Camille Chamoun Sports City Stadium, Beirut, Lebanon	Somalia	2–0	4–0	2009 Arab Nations Cup qualification
4	8 October 2007	Saida Municipal Stadium, Sidon, Lebanon	India	2–1	4–1	2010 FIFA World Cup qualification
5	8 October 2007	Saida Municipal Stadium, Sidon, Lebanon	India	4–1	4–1	2010 FIFA World Cup qualification
6	30 October 2007	Fatorda Stadium, Margao, India	India	1–1	2–2	2010 FIFA World Cup qualification
7	30 October 2007	Fatorda Stadium, Margao, India	India	2–1	2–2	2010 FIFA World Cup qualification
8	2 January 2008	Thamir Stadium, Salmiya, Kuwait	Kuwait	1–0	2–3	Friendly
9	9 April 2008	Camille Chamoun Sports City Stadium, Beirut, Lebanon	Maldives	4–0	4–0	2011 AFC Asian Cup qualification
10	27 May 2008	Thani bin Jassim Stadium, Doha, Qatar	Qatar	1–0	1–2	Friendly
11	7 June 2008	King Fahd International Stadium, Riyadh, Saudi Arabia	Saudi Arabia	1–2	1–2	2010 FIFA World Cup qualification
12	17 August 2011	Saida International Stadium, Sidon, Lebanon	Syria	2–1	2–3	Friendly
13	6 September 2011	Camille Chamoun Sports City Stadium, Beirut, Lebanon	United Arab Emirates	1–1	3–1	2014 FIFA World Cup qualification
14	27 May 2012	Sultan Qaboos Sports Complex, Muscat, Oman	Oman	1–0	1–1	Friendly
15	15 October 2013	Camille Chamoun Sports City Stadium, Beirut, Lebanon	United Arab Emirates	1–1	1–1	2015 AFC Asian Cup qualification
16	5 March 2014	Rajamangala Stadium, Bangkok, Thailand	Thailand	1–0	5–2	2015 AFC Asian Cup qualification
17	24 May 2015	Saida International Stadium, Sidon, Lebanon	Syria	2–2	2–2	Friendly
18	16 June 2015	New Laos National Stadium, Vientiane, Laos	Laos	1–0	2–0	2018 FIFA World Cup qualification
19	28 March 2017	Camille Chamoun Sports City Stadium, Beirut, Lebanon	Hong Kong	1–0	2–0	2019 AFC Asian Cup qualification

== Honours ==
The Lebanon national team's technical unit honoured Ghaddar for being the top scorer of the 2007 AFC Cup. National team coach Emile Rustom presented Ghaddar the golden boot during a ceremony at the Meridien Commodore hotel in Beirut. On 28 March 2021, the AFC nominated Ghaddar among the best all-time strikers of the AFC Cup.

Nejmeh

- Lebanese Premier League: 2003–04, 2004–05
- Lebanese FA Cup: 2021–22
- Lebanese Elite Cup: 2002, 2003, 2004, 2005
- Lebanese Super Cup: 2002, 2004

Al Ahly

- Egyptian Premier League: 2010–11

Kelantan

- Malaysia Super League: 2012
- Malaysia Cup: 2012
- Malaysia FA Cup: 2012, 2013

Johor Darul Ta'zim

- Malaysia Super League: 2017
- Malaysia Cup: 2017

Johor Darul Ta'zim II

- Malaysia Challenge Cup: 2019

Individual

- Lebanese Premier League Team of the Season: 2006–07, 2007–08
- AFC Cup top scorer: 2007
- Lebanese Premier League top scorer: 2006–07, 2007–08
- Malaysia Super League top scorer: 2017

== See also ==
- List of Lebanon international footballers
