= Nik Ahmad Fadly =

Malaysian footballer and coach

Personal information
- Birth name: Nik Ahmad Fadly bin Nik Leh
- Date of birth: 28 May 1977 (age 49)
- Place of birth: Kota Bharu, Kelantan, Malaysia
- Height: 1.75 m (5 ft 9 in)
- Position: Midfielder

Team information
- Current team: Kelantan FA U19 (Assistant coach)

Youth career
- 1996–1997: Kelantan FA
- 1999: Olympic 2000

Senior career*
Years	Team	Apps	(Gls)
1998	Olympic 2000		
2000–2001	Kelantan FA		
2002–2003	Kuala Lumpur FA		
2004	TNB Kelantan FC		
2005–2006	Malacca FA		
2006–2008	Kelantan FA		
Total		??	(??)

International career^{‡}
1997–1998	Malaysia U-21		
1999–2000	Malaysia U-23		
1997–2001	Malaysia	1	(0)

Managerial career
- 2013–: Kelantan FA U19 (Assistant coach)
- * Club domestic league appearances and goals as of 31 May 2011 ‡ National team caps and goals as of 29 July 2011

Nik Ahmad Fadly bin Nik Leh (born 28 May 1977) is a Malaysian former professional footballer who currently serves as Kelantan FA U19 assistant coach.

== Career ==
=== Coaching ===
In 2013, Nik Fadly has been appointed as an assistant coach for Kelantan FA U19 team and Tengku Hazman Raja Hassan as the head coach.

=== Club career ===
Nik Fadly spent most of his professional career playing for Kelantan FA. He also used to play with Kuala Lumpur FA, Malacca FA and TNB Kelantan FC. He was also in the Olympic 2000 team that were playing in the Malaysian League for the 1998 season.

=== National team ===
Nik Ahmad Fadly's sole Malaysia senior team appearance came in 2001, in the 2001 Merdeka Tournament group game against Bahrain.

He was in the Malaysia national under-21 football team that competed in the 1997 FIFA World Youth Championship, held in Malaysia. He scored the only goal for Malaysia in the tournament in a 1-3 loss against Uruguay, as Malaysia exited the tournament in group stage having lost all 3 group games.

== Personal life ==
His father, Nik Leh, was also a footballer for TNB Kelantan FC and Kelantan FA in the 1970s.
