= Indra Putra Mahayuddin =

Malaysian footballer (born 1981)

- Indra Putra with Kelantan in 2012

Personal information
- Full name: Indra Putra bin Mahayuddin
- Date of birth: 2 September 1981 (age 45)
- Place of birth: Ipoh, Perak, Malaysia
- Height: 1.75 m (5 ft 9 in)
- Position: Forward

Youth career
- 1997–1998: Perak

Senior career*
| Years | Team | Apps | (Gls) |
| 1999–2003 | Perak | 45 | (10) |
| 2004–2007 | Pahang | 54 | (29) |
| 2008 | Selangor | 23 | (3) |
| 2009–2010 | Kelantan | 44 | (23) |
| 2011–2012 | T-Team | 24 | (11) |
| 2012–2013 | Kelantan | 46 | (13) |
| 2014–2015 | Felda United | 39 | (16) |
| 2016–2017 | Kelantan | 38 | (5) |
| 2018–2021 | Kuala Lumpur City | 72 | (15) |
| 2022 | Perak | 9 | (0) |
| 2023 | Kelantan United | 24 | (4) |
| 2024–2025 | PT Athletic | 9 | (3) |

International career^{‡}
| 2001–2004 | Malaysia U23 | | |
| 2002–2015 | Malaysia | 56 | (17) |
Medal record
Malaysia under-23
Sea Games
| Silver medal – second place | Sea Games 2001 | Football |
Malaysia
Asean Football Championship
| Runner-up | AFF Suzuki Cup 2014 | 2014 |
- * Club domestic league appearances and goals ‡ National team caps and goals as of 22 October 2020

Indra Putra bin Mahayuddin PB (born 2 September 1981) is a former Malaysian professional footballer. Beforehand, Indra Putra was the Malaysia Super League's all-time top scorer (surpassed by Johor Darul Ta'zim's Bérgson). Indra Putra is a versatile forward who can operate as a winger.

== Club career ==
=== Perak ===
Indra Putra has played for the Perak youth team when he was a teenager. He then was promoted to the senior team in 1999 under the late German coach Karl-Heinz Weigang. He made his senior debut in the 1999 Malaysia Cup qualifying round. He scored his first goal in a 2–1 home win against Penang in the 1999 Malaysia Cup.

With Perak, Indra Putra mainly started playing in the left wing and occasionally as striker. He helped Perak to clinch the back to back Malaysian Premier One League title in 2002 and 2003.

=== Pahang ===
In 2004, Indra Putra moved to Pahang in a high-profile transfer. There, Indra helped Pahang to win the inaugural edition of the rebranded Malaysian Super League in his first season.

Indra Putra was described as the best Malaysian football player in his generation by former Perak coach Steve Darby. He was the 2004 Malaysian Super League season top goalscorer with 15 goals from 19 league appearances. He remains, until this day, the last Malaysian player to win that accolade in the presence of foreign players.

=== Selangor ===
Indra Putra joined Selangor for the 2008 season, after his contract with Pahang expired.

=== Kelantan ===
During 2009 season, Indra Putra joined Kelantan and was partnered upfront by his former Perak teammate in Khalid Jamlus. On 18 April 2009, he was the villain among the Negeri Sembilan supporters after stamping on Negeri's defender, Rahman Zabul. Amazingly, he escaped the red card. He was part of the Kelantan team that play in that year Malaysia FA Cup final against Selangor where Kelantan lost 3–1 on penalties his spot kick hit the bar which cost Kelantan the match. Kelantan suffered another setback when lost the 2009 Malaysia Cup final against Negeri Sembilan. Indra scored a consolation goal from the free kick. However, Indra was chosen as the most valuable player for the 2009 season. He was part of Kelantan's 2010 Malaysia Cup winning team.

=== T-Team ===
Indra signed with Kuala Terengganu-based club, T-Team in 2011. He made 24 league appearances scoring 11 goals. He also helped T-Team reaching the Malaysia Cup semi-final.

=== Second stint with Kelantan ===
After one season with T-Team, Indra Putra returned to Kelantan for the 2012 season. During the 2012 Malaysia Cup final at the Shah Alam Stadium, he scored an extra-time winner and clinched a dramatic 3–2 victory over ATM. During the season, he also help the team win the 2012 Super League and 2012 Malaysia FA Cup, completing the treble.

=== Felda United ===
Indra Putra joined Felda United, who were just relegated to the Premier League, at the end of the 2013. He helped the club finish runners-up in the 2014 Malaysia Premier League, and the club was promoted straight back to the Malaysia Super League after only being in the second division for one season.

=== Third stint with Kelantan ===
On 30 December 2015, Indra Putra was officially announced as Kelantan new signing during a friendly match with PKNP by Kelantan FA President, Annuar Musa. He was released at the end of his contract.

=== Kuala Lumpur City ===
On 3 December 2017, Indra Putra signed a contract with newly promoted side Kuala Lumpur City after being released by Kelantan. He scored his first goal in a 2–2 draw against Pahang FA. He then scored his second goal against his former club, Kelantan in a 4–2 defeat. On 27 April 2019 he scored 100 goal in Malaysian Super League against PKNS; his first goal was 21 February 2004 against Sabah.

=== Perak ===
In January 2022, Indra Putra returned to Perak after nearly 19 years away from the club.

=== Kelantan United ===
On 3 January 2023, Indra Putra joined Malaysia Super League club Kelantan United where he was named as the club captain for the 2023 season.

=== PT Athletic ===
In April 2024, Indra Putra signed for Malaysia A1 Semi-Pro League club PT Athletic where he was named as the club captain.

== International career ==
Indra Putra has played for the Malaysia at youth level and senior level. He represented Malaysia U-23 for the 2001 Sea Games in Kuala Lumpur, Malaysia.

=== Senior ===
In 2002, Indra was call up for an international friendly match against five times FIFA World Cup winners Brazil. He was selected as one of the first eleven to play against Brazilian stars such as Ronaldo, Rivaldo and Ronaldinho.

After that, he joined national team in the FA Premier League Asia Cup 2003 and also in the 2002 AFF Championship in Thailand, helping Malaysia national team to a 4th-place finish.

Indra also been called up by Malaysia coach Norizan Bakar for the 2007 AFC Asian Cup in July, co-hosting by 4 countries Thailand, Indonesia, Vietnam and Malaysia. In the competition, Indra Putra is the only Malaysian player to score a goal, against China, as Malaysia crashed out in the group stages having lost all group games.

Indra was unexpectedly recalled to Malaysia national team, after a long period of absence, for a match against Indonesia on 14 September 2014 by national coach Dollah Salleh. He entered the match as a substitute, which ended in a 2–0 loss to Malaysia. At the 2014 AFF Championship, he score Malaysia's third goal in a 3–1 win against host Singapore. The goal became a viral meme after the Malaysia-Singapore match. In the second leg of the 2014 AFF Championship final match, Indra Putra scored the second goal before half time to level Malaysia on aggregate. Malaysia won 3–2 but lose 4–3 on aggregate.

=== Others ===
Indra Putra also represented the Malaysia Selection against Premier League clubs. He played against Manchester United twice in 2001 and 2009, and Chelsea at Shah Alam Stadium on 29 July 2008.

== Career statistics ==
=== Club ===
As of 17 December 2023

Appearances and goals by club, season and competition
| Club | Season | League | | National cup (Note: Malaysia FA Cup) | | League cup (Note: Malaysia Cup) | | Others | | Total | |
| Club | Season | Apps | Goals | Apps | Goals | Apps | Goals | Apps | Goals | Apps | Goals |
|---|---|---|---|---|---|---|---|---|---|---|---|
| Perak | 1999 | 0 | 0 | — | | 6 | 2 | 4 (Note: Appearances at the 1999 Malaysia Cup qualifying round.) | 0 | 10 | 2 |
| Perak | 2000 | 1 | 0 | 0 | 0 | 5 | 0 | — | | 6 | 0 |
| Perak | 2001 | 10 | 0 | 3 | 0 | 8 | 2 | — | | 21 | 2 |
| Perak | 2002 | 22 | 5 | 8 | 6 | 9 | 5 | — | | 39 | 16 |
| Perak | 2003 | 12 | 5 | 1 | 0 | 7 | 1 | 3 (Note: Appearances at the 2003 ASEAN Club Championship.) | 1 | 23 | 7 |
| Perak | Total | 45 | 10 | 12 | 6 | 35 | 10 | 7 | 1 | 99 | 27 |
| Pahang | 2004 | 19 | 15 | 6 | 4 | 9 | 4 | — | | 34 | 23 |
| Pahang | 2005 | 18 | 11 | 1 | 0 | 7 | 3 | 6 (Note: Appearances at the 2005 AFC Cup.) | 4 | 32 | 18 |
| Pahang | 2005–06 | 15 | 3 | 7 | 7 | 2 | 1 | — | | 24 | 11 |
| Pahang | 2006–07 | 2 | 0 | 0 | 0 | 0 | 0 | — | | 2 | 0 |
| Pahang | Total | 54 | 29 | 14 | 11 | 18 | 8 | 6 | 4 | 92 | 52 |
| Selangor | 2007–08 | 23 | 3 | 8 | 0 | 14 | 4 | — | | 45 | 7 |
| Kelantan | 2009 | 19 | 14 | 8 | 4 | 9 | 11 | — | | 36 | 29 |
| Kelantan | 2010 | 25 | 9 | 2 | 1 | 11 | 3 | — | | 38 | 13 |
| Kelantan | Total | 44 | 23 | 10 | 5 | 20 | 14 | — | | 74 | 42 |
| T-Team | 2011 | 24 | 11 | 1 | 1 | 9 | 5 | — | | 34 | 17 |
| Kelantan | 2012 | 25 | 7 | 7 | 2 | 10 | 3 | 7 (Note: Appearances at the 2012 AFC Cup and 2012 Malaysia Charity Shield) | 1 | 49 | 13 |
| Kelantan | 2013 | 21 | 6 | 6 | 2 | 11 | 5 | 7 (Note: Appearances at the 2013 AFC Cup and 2013 Malaysia Charity Shield) | 2 | 45 | 15 |
| Kelantan | Total | 46 | 13 | 13 | 4 | 21 | 8 | 14 | 3 | 94 | 28 |
| Felda United | 2014 | 18 | 10 | 6 | 2 | 9 | 2 | — | | 33 | 14 |
| Felda United | 2015 | 21 | 6 | 1 | 0 | 9 | 1 | — | | 31 | 7 |
| Felda United | Total | 39 | 16 | 7 | 2 | 18 | 3 | — | | 64 | 21 |
| Kelantan | 2016 | 17 | 3 | 2 | 0 | 7 | 1 | — | | 26 | 4 |
| Kelantan | 2017 | 21 | 2 | 1 | 1 | 6 | 0 | — | | 28 | 3 |
| Kelantan | Total | 38 | 5 | 3 | 1 | 13 | 1 | — | | 54 | 7 |
| Kuala Lumpur | 2018 | 20 | 6 | 4 | 0 | 6 | 0 | — | | 30 | 6 |
| Kuala Lumpur | 2019 | 21 | 6 | 4 | 3 | — | | 5 (Note: Appearances at the 2019 Malaysia Challenge Cup) | 0 | 30 | 9 |
| Kuala Lumpur | 2020 | 11 | 3 | — | | — | | — | | 11 | 3 |
| Kuala Lumpur | 2021 | 20 | 0 | 0 | 0 | 7 | 0 | — | | 27 | 0 |
| Kuala Lumpur | Total | 72 | 15 | 8 | 3 | 13 | 0 | 5 | 0 | 98 | 18 |
| Perak | 2022 | 9 | 0 | — | | — | | — | | 9 | 0 |
| Kelantan United | 2023 | 24 | 4 | 1 | 0 | 2 | 1 | 3 (Note: Appearances at the 2023 MFL Challenge Cup) | 1 | 30 | 6 |
| Career total | | 418 | 129 | 77 | 33 | 163 | 54 | 35 | 9 | 693 | 225 |

=== International ===
As of match played 22 October 2020

Appearances and goals by national team and year
| National team | Year | Apps | Goals |
|---|---|---|---|
| Malaysia | 2002 | 8 | 5 |
| Malaysia | 2003 | 6 | 1 |
| Malaysia | 2004 | 5 | 0 |
| Malaysia | 2006 | 4 | 1 |
| Malaysia | 2007 | 7 | 1 |
| Malaysia | 2008 | 10 | 7 |
| Malaysia | 2009 | 1 | 0 |
| Malaysia | 2014 | 11 | 2 |
| Malaysia | 2015 | 4 | 0 |
| Total | | 56 | 17 |

As of December 2014
Scores and results list Templatonia's goal tally first, score column indicates score after each Indra Putra goal.

List of international goals scored by Indra Putra Mahayuddin
| No. | Date | Venue | Opponent | Score | Result | Competition |
|---|---|---|---|---|---|---|
| 1 | 11 December 2002 | Petaling Jaya, Malaysia | Cambodia | | 5–0 | Friendly |
| 2 | 18 December 2002 | Singapore, Singapore | Singapore | 2–0 | 4–0 | 2002 Tiger Cup |
| 3 | 18 December 2002 | Singapore, Singapore | Singapore | 3–0 | 4–0 | 2002 Tiger Cup |
| 4 | 20 December 2002 | Singapore, Singapore | Thailand | 3–1 | 3–1 | 2002 Tiger Cup |
| 5 | 29 December 2002 | Singapore, Singapore | Vietnam | 1–1 | 1–2 | 2002 Tiger Cup |
| 6 | 22 October 2003 | Manama, Bahrain | Bahrain | 1–1 | 1–3 | 2004 AFC Asian Cup qualification |
| 7 | 23 August 2006 | Shah Alam, Malaysia | Myanmar | 1–0 | 1–2 | 2006 Pestabola Merdeka |
| 8 | 10 July 2007 | Kuala Lumpur, Malaysia | China | 1–4 | 1–5 | 2007 AFC Asian Cup |
| 9 | 22 July 2008 | Hyderabad, India | India | 1–1 | 1–1 | Friendly |
| 10 | 15 October 2008 | Kelana Jaya, Malaysia | Nepal | 1–0 | 4–0 | 2008 Pestabola Merdeka |
| 11 | 23 October 2008 | Kuala Lumpur, Malaysia | Myanmar | 1–0 | 4–0 | 2008 Pestabola Merdeka |
| 12 | 23 October 2008 | Kuala Lumpur, Malaysia | Myanmar | 3–0 | 4–0 | 2008 Pestabola Merdeka |
| 13 | 6 December 2008 | Phuket, Thailand | Laos | 3–0 | 3–0 | 2008 AFF Suzuki Cup |
| 14 | 8 December 2008 | Phuket, Thailand | Vietnam | 1–1 | 2–3 | 2008 AFF Suzuki Cup |
| 15 | 8 December 2008 | Phuket, Thailand | Vietnam | 2–2 | 2–3 | 2008 AFF Suzuki Cup |
| 16 | 29 November 2014 | Singapore, Singapore | Singapore | 3–1 | 3–1 | 2014 AFF Suzuki Cup |
| 17 | 20 December 2014 | Bukit Jalil, Malaysia | Thailand | 2–0 | 3–2 | 2014 AFF Suzuki Cup |

== Honours ==
=== Club ===
Perak

- Liga Perdana 1: 2002, 2003

Pahang

- Malaysia Super League: 2004
- Malaysia FA Cup: 2006

Kelantan

- Malaysia Super League: 2012
- Malaysia FA Cup: 2012, 2013
- Malaysia Cup: 2010, 2012

Kuala Lumpur City

- Malaysia Cup: 2021

=== International ===
Malaysia U-23

- SEA Games: (silver) silver 2001; (bronze) bronze 2003

Malaysia

- Pestabola Merdeka: 2008 runner up
- AFF Championship: 2014 runner up

=== Individual ===
- Malaysia Super League Golden Boot: 2004 (15 goals)
- Pestabola Merdeka Top Scorer: 2006
- FAM Football Awards – Best Striker Award: 2009 – Kelantan FA
- FAM Football Awards – Most Valuable Players: 2009 – Kelantan FA

=== Records ===
- The first player to reach 100 goals in Malaysia Super League
- All-time highest goalscorer in Malaysia Super League (106 goals)
