= Onyekachi Nwoha =

Nigerian footballer

Personal information
- Full name: Onyekachi Paul Nwoha
- Date of birth: 28 February 1983 (age 43)
- Place of birth: Aba, Nigeria
- Height: 1.79 m (5 ft 10 in)
- Position: Forward

Youth career
- Speeders FC

Senior career*
Years	Team	Apps	(Gls)
2000–2001	Speeders FC		
2001–2002	Enyimba International		
2002–2003	Enugu Rangers		
2003–2004	Etoile Sahel		
2004–2005	Al-Khaleej Club		
2005–2006	Al Ain Club		
2006–2008	Metalist Kharkiv	26	(3)
2008	→ Zorya Luhansk (loan)	8	(1)
2008–2011	Al-Fujairah		(1)
2012	Kelantan	5	(1)
2013	Sabah	?	(?)
- * Club domestic league appearances and goals

Onyekachi Paul Nwoha (born 28 February 1983 in Aba) is a Nigerian footballer who plays as a forward.

== Club career ==
Onyekachi Nwoha began his career with FC Spiders, before he transferred to Enyimba International in 2001. He played for the Aba based team for one year before moving to League rival Enugu Rangers. In 2003, Nwoha was scouted by Tunisian top club Etoile Sahel. In Tunisia, he played for a year before moving to Saudi Arabian side United Al-Khaleej Club. In 2005, Nwoha moved to Arabic Emirates club Al Ain Club.

He transferred to Metalist Kharkiv in 2006.

From January to July 2008, he was loaned out to FC Zorya Luhansk. In the summer of 2008, he left Metalist Kharkiv and signed with Al Fujairah Sports Club in the UAE Division 1.

In February 2012, he left Bahrain to have a trial with the 2011 Malaysia Super League champions, Kelantan FA. Just two days after his arrival, he was offered a contract which he signed and officially unveiled as the new Kelantan import player. Nwoha made his debut on 14 February 2012 against Selangor FA. He was released from his contract in May 2012.
