= 2012 Malaysia Cup =

Piala Malaysia

Tournament details
- Country: Malaysia; Singapore
- Teams: 16

Final positions
- Champions: Kelantan FA (2nd title)
- Runners-up: ATM FA

Tournament statistics
- Matches played: 58
- Goals scored: 64 (1.1 per match)
- Top goal scorer: 12 goals Marlon Alex James

Awards
- Best player: Norshahrul Idlan

The 2012 Malaysia Cup (Malay: Piala Malaysia 2012) was the 86th edition of Malaysia Cup. The competition began on 24 August 2012 and ended on 20 October 2012 with the final, held at Shah Alam Stadium. A total of 16 teams took part in the competition. The teams were divided into four groups, each containing four teams. The group leaders and runners-up teams in the groups after 6 matches qualified to the quarterfinals.

Negeri Sembilan FA were the defending champions, having beaten Terengganu FA 2–1 in last season's final.

For the first time since 1994, a Singapore team took part in the competition under the name LIONSXII.

== Format ==
In this competition, the top 12 teams from 2012 Malaysia Super League is joined by the top 4 teams from 2012 Malaysia Premier League. The teams will be drawn into four groups of four teams.

As part of the agreement between Football Association of Malaysia and Football Association of Singapore, a Singapore team will participate in Malaysia Cup. This marks the comeback of the Singapore team in Malaysia Cup having last participated 18 years before in 1994, where they won the competition, as the Singapore Lions. The new team will be known as LIONSXII.

== Seeding ==
The 16 teams were divided into four pots for the draw, each containing four teams. The standings in Super League and Premier League 2012 ended on 14 July 2012 – was used to seed the teams.

Pot 1	Pot 2	Pot 3	Pot 4
Kelantan FA (Singapore) LIONSXII; Selangor FA; Perak FA	Terengganu FA; Negeri Sembilan FA (Selangor) PKNS FC; T-Team FC	Johor FC (Kuala Lumpur) Felda United FC; Sarawak FA; Kedah FA	ATM FA; Pahang FA (Kuala Lumpur) Sime Darby FC; Johor FA

== Group stage ==
=== Group A ===
Pos	Team	Pld	W	D	L	GF	GA	GD	Pts
1	(Singapore) LIONSXII (A)	6	2	3	1	4	2	+2	9
2	Johor FC (A)	6	2	3	1	6	6	0	9
3	Johor FA	6	2	2	2	7	5	+2	8
4	(Selangor) PKNS FC	6	1	2	3	5	9	−4	5

(A) Advanced to knockout stage
Wednesday 22 August
20:45 UTC+08:00

PKNS FC (Selangor)	1 – 1	Johor FA
Michaël Niçoise 85'	Report	Muriel Orlando 78' (pen.)

Petaling Jaya Stadium, Petaling Jaya, Selangor
Wednesday 22 August
20:45 UTC+08:00

Johor FC	0 – 0	(Singapore) LIONSXII

Pasir Gudang Corporation Stadium, Pasir Gudang, Johor

Saturday 25 August
19:45 UTC+08:00

LIONSXII (Singapore)	3 – 1	(Selangor) PKNS FC
Khairul Amri 13'; Shaiful Esah 18'; Shahril Ishak 48'		Fazli Baharudin 8'

Jalan Besar Stadium, Kallang, Singapore
Attendance: 3,311
Saturday 25 August
20:45 UTC+08:00

Johor FA	1 – 2	Johor FC
Muriel Orlando 60' (pen.)		Shahrizal Saad 39'; Arthuro 70'

Tan Sri Dato Hj Hassan Yunos Stadium, Johor Bahru, Johor
Attendance: 5000
Referee: Syed Azhar Syed Kamar

Tuesday 28 August
20:45 UTC+08:00

Johor FA	0 – 0	(Singapore) LIONSXII

Tan Sri Dato Hj Hassan Yunos Stadium, Johor Bahru, Johor
Tuesday 28 August
20:45 UTC+08:00

PKNS FC (Selangor)	1 – 1	Johor FC
Helmi Loussaief 60'		Shahrizal Saad 28'

Petaling Jaya Stadium, Petaling Jaya, Selangor

Saturday 1 September
19:45 UTC+08:00

LIONSXII (Singapore)	1 – 0	Johor FA
Khairul Amri 2'

Jalan Besar Stadium, Kallang, Singapore
Attendance: 4,836
Saturday 1 September
20:45 UTC+08:00

Johor FC	2 – 1	(Selangor) PKNS FC
Arthuro 63' 90'		Norhakim Hassan 38'

Pasir Gudang Corporation Stadium, Pasir Gudang, Johor
Attendance: 5000
Referee: Teoh Hee Loon (Melaka)

Tuesday 4 September
20:45 UTC+08:00

Johor FC	1 – 3	Johor FA
Arthuro 68'		Muriel Orlando 18' (pen.); Hadin Azman 38'; Hadin Azman 53'

Tan Sri Dato Hj Hassan Yunos Stadium, Johor Bahru, Johor
Tuesday 4 September
20:45 UTC+08:00

PKNS FC (Selangor)	1 – 0	(Singapore) LIONSXII
Helmi Loussaief 90'

Petaling Jaya Stadium, Petaling Jaya, Selangor

Friday 14 September
20:45 UTC+08:00

LIONSXII (Singapore)	0 – 0	Johor FC

Jalan Besar Stadium, Kallang, Singapore
Attendance: 5,198
Friday 14 September
20:45 UTC+08:00

Johor FA	2 – 0	(Selangor) PKNS FC
Muriel Orlando 1' 37'

Tan Sri Dato Hj Hassan Yunos Stadium, Johor Bahru, Johor
Referee: Ahmad Tajudin Mohd Yusof

=== Group B ===
Pos	Team	Pld	W	D	L	GF	GA	GD	Pts
1	Kelantan FA (A)	6	3	2	1	13	8	+5	11
2	ATM FA (A)	6	3	2	1	12	8	+4	11
3	Kedah FA	6	1	3	2	6	8	−2	6
4	Terengganu FA	6	1	1	4	6	13	−7	4

(A) Advanced to knockout stage
Wednesday 22 August
20:45 UTC+08:00

Kedah FA	0 – 2	ATM FA
		K. Reuben 20'; Zaquan Adha 81' (pen.)

Darul Aman Stadium, Alor Setar, Kedah
Wednesday 22 August
20:45 UTC+08:00

Terengganu FA	2 – 0	Kelantan FA
Francis Doe 3'; Ismail Faruqi 89'

Sultan Ismail Nasiruddin Shah Stadium, Kuala Terengganu, Terengganu

Saturday 25 August
20:45 UTC+08:00

ATM FA	2 – 1	Terengganu FA
Marlon 31' 74'		Joseph Kalang 76'

Majlis Perbandaran Selayang Stadium, Selayang, Selangor
Saturday 25 August
20:45 UTC+08:00

Kelantan FA	2 – 1	Kedah FA
Afiq Azmi 29' 45'		Khyril Muhymeen 4'

Sultan Mohammad IV Stadium, Kota Bharu, Kelantan

Tuesday 28 August
20:45 UTC+08:00

ATM FA	1 – 1	Kelantan FA
Marlon 55'		Obinna Nwaneri 87'

Majlis Perbandaran Selayang Stadium, Selayang, Selangor
Tuesday 28 August
20:45 UTC+08:00

Kedah FA	2 – 1	Terengganu FA
Khyril Muhymeen 8' 49'		Hadi Yahya 20'

Darul Aman Stadium, Alor Setar, Kedah

Saturday 1 September
20:45 UTC+08:00

Kelantan FA	4 – 3	ATM FA
Afiq Azmi 7'; Norshahrul 28'; Norfarhan Mohamad 75'; Nurul Azwan 85'		Marlon 26' 35'; Hairuddin Omar 43'

Sultan Mohammad IV Stadium, Kota Bharu, Kelantan
Attendance: 25,000
Saturday 1 September
20:45 UTC+08:00

Terengganu FA	1 – 1	Kedah FA
Francis Doe 24'		Sharbinee Allawee 78' (o.g.)

Sultan Ismail Nasiruddin Shah Stadium, Kuala Terengganu, Terengganu

Tuesday 4 September
20:45 UTC+08:00

Terengganu FA	0 – 2	ATM FA
		Marlon 73'; Martelotto 83'

Sultan Ismail Nasiruddin Shah Stadium, Kuala Terengganu, Terengganu
Tuesday 4 September
20:45 UTC+08:00

Kedah FA	0 – 0	Kelantan FA

Darul Aman Stadium, Alor Setar, Kedah

Friday 14 September
20:45 UTC+08:00

ATM FA	2 – 2	Kedah FA
Marlon 18'; Martelotto 33'		Abdulfatah Safi 65'; Khyril Muhymeen 76'

Majlis Perbandaran Selayang Stadium, Selayang, Selangor
Friday 14 September
20:45 UTC+08:00

Kelantan FA	6 – 1	Terengganu FA
Afiq Azmi 13'; Norfarhan Mohamad 29' 47'; Badri Radzi 76' 81'; Indra Putra 86'		Hasmizan Kamarodin 79'

Sultan Mohammad IV Stadium, Kota Bharu, Kelantan

=== Group C ===
Pos	Team	Pld	W	D	L	GF	GA	GD	Pts
1	Negeri Sembilan FA (A)	6	2	4	0	8	3	+5	10
2	(Kuala Lumpur) Felda United FC (A)	6	1	4	1	13	12	+1	7
3	Perak FA	6	1	3	2	7	9	−2	6
4	(Kuala Lumpur) Sime Darby FC	6	1	3	2	9	13	−4	6

(A) Advanced to knockout stage
Wednesday 22 August
20:45 UTC+08:00

Felda United FC (Kuala Lumpur)	1 – 1	Negeri Sembilan FA
Eddy Viator 80'		Khairul Izuan 49'

Hang Jebat Stadium, Ayer Keroh, Malacca
Attendance: 2,427
Wednesday 22 August
20:45 UTC+08:00

Sime Darby FC (Kuala Lumpur)	1 – 1	Perak FA
Leandro Teofilo 64'		Fahrul Razi 89'

Majlis Perbandaran Selayang Stadium, Selayang, Selangor
Attendance: 3,480

Saturday 25 August
20:45 UTC+08:00

Negeri Sembilan FA	4 – 0	(Kuala Lumpur) Sime Darby FC
Effa Owona 1' 60' 83'; Khairul Izuan 51'

Tuanku Abdul Rahman Stadium, Paroi, Negeri Sembilan
Saturday 25 August
20:45 UTC+08:00

Perak FA	2 – 4	(Kuala Lumpur) Felda United FC
Nazri Kamal 62' 86'	Report	Antoine-Curier 27'; Nasir Basharuddin 32' (o.g.); Fakri Saarani 38'; Raimi Mohd Nor 68'

Perak Stadium, Ipoh, Perak

Tuesday 28 August
20:45 UTC+08:00

Negeri Sembilan FA	0 – 0	Perak FA

Tuanku Abdul Rahman Stadium, Paroi, Negeri Sembilan
Tuesday 28 August
20:45 UTC+08:00

Felda United FC (Kuala Lumpur)	2 – 3	(Kuala Lumpur) Sime Darby FC
S. Sivanesan 41'; Fakri Saarani 62'		Patrick Wleh 10' 51'; Faiz Isa 22'

Hang Jebat Stadium, Ayer Keroh, Malacca

Saturday 1 September
20:45 UTC+08:00

Perak FA	0 – 1	Negeri Sembilan FA
		Effa Owona 45+3' (pen.)

Perak Stadium, Ipoh, Perak
Attendance: 7,000
Saturday 1 September
20:45 UTC+08:00

Sime Darby FC (Kuala Lumpur)	3 – 3	(Kuala Lumpur) Felda United FC
Leandro Teofilo 15'; Patrick Wleh 54' 83'		Antoine-Curier 20' 40' 82'

Majlis Perbandaran Selayang Stadium, Selayang, Selangor

Tuesday 4 September
20:45 UTC+08:00

Sime Darby FC (Kuala Lumpur)	1 – 1	Negeri Sembilan FA
Patrick Wleh 10'		Alif Shamsudin 62'

Majlis Perbandaran Selayang Stadium, Selayang, Selangor
Tuesday 4 September
20:45 UTC+08:00

Felda United FC (Kuala Lumpur)	2 – 2	Perak FA
Farderin Kadir 7'; Mickaël Antoine 83'		Shahrom Kalam 3'; Fazrul Hazli 48'

Hang Jebat Stadium, Ayer Keroh, Malacca

Friday 14 September
20:45 UTC+08:00

Negeri Sembilan FA	1 – 1	(Kuala Lumpur) Felda United FC
Effa Owona 76'		Farderin Kadir 19'

Tuanku Abdul Rahman Stadium, Paroi, Negeri Sembilan
Friday 14 September
20:45 UTC+08:00

Perak FA	2 – 1	(Kuala Lumpur) Sime Darby FC
Bodjongo 12' 48'		Faiz Isa 90+4'

Perak Stadium, Ipoh, Perak

=== Group D ===
Pos	Team	Pld	W	D	L	GF	GA	GD	Pts
1	Selangor FA (A)	6	4	1	1	12	6	+6	13
2	Pahang FA (A)	6	3	1	2	17	13	+4	10
3	Sarawak FA	6	2	1	3	10	13	−3	7
4	(Terengganu) T-Team	6	1	1	4	7	14	−7	4

(A) Advanced to knockout stage
Wednesday 22 August
20:15 UTC+08:00

Sarawak FA	2 – 1	Selangor FA
Ashri Chuchu 17'; Sharudin Yakup 63'		Syed Muhammad 8' (o.g.)

Sarawak State Stadium, Kuching, Sarawak
Wednesday 22 August
20:45 UTC+08:00

Pahang FA	3 – 2	(Terengganu) PBDKT T-Team FC
Azamuddin 17'; Hafiz Kamal 49'; Faizol Hussien 84'		Syed Md 64'; Zairo 90'

Darulmakmur Stadium, Kuantan, Pahang

Saturday 25 August
20:45 UTC+08:00

PBDKT T-Team FC (Terengganu)	0 – 0	Sarawak FA

Sultan Ismail Nasiruddin Shah Stadium, Kuala Terengganu, Terengganu
Saturday 25 August
20:45 UTC+08:00

Selangor FA	2 – 2	Pahang FA
Safiq Rahim 17'; Boško Balaban 65'		Maycon 15'; Fauzi Roslan 25'

Shah Alam Stadium, Shah Alam, Selangor

Tuesday 28 August
20:45 UTC+08:00

PBDKT T-Team FC (Terengganu)	0 – 1	Selangor FA
		Safiq Rahim 80' (pen.)

Sultan Ismail Nasiruddin Shah Stadium, Kuala Terengganu, Terengganu
Tuesday 28 August
20:45 UTC+08:00

Pahang FA	6 – 0	Sarawak FA
Syed Md 33' 45' 88'; Boris Kochkin 61'; Hafiz Kamal 72'; R. Gopinathan 90'

Darulmakmur Stadium, Kuantan, Pahang

Saturday 1 September
20:15 UTC+08:00

Sarawak FA	2 – 3	Pahang FA
Rasyid Aya 12'; Joël Epalle 37'		Maycon 21'; Azamuddin 59' 68'

Sarawak State Stadium, Kuching, Sarawak
Saturday 1 September
20:45 UTC+08:00

Selangor FA	2 – 1	(Terengganu) PBDKT T-Team FC
Boško Balaban 4' 28'		Fadzli Saari 80'

Shah Alam Stadium, Shah Alam, Selangor

Tuesday 4 September
20:15 UTC+08:00

Sarawak FA	6 – 1	(Terengganu) PBDKT T-Team FC
Joel Epalle 41' 65'; Mohd Azizan Baba 57'; Bobby Gonzales 73'; Rasyid Aya 76'; Sharudin Yakup 82'		Zairo 90' (pen.)

Sarawak State Stadium, Kuching, Sarawak
Tuesday 4 September
20:45 UTC+08:00

Pahang FA	1 – 4	Selangor FA
Mohd Hafiz Kamal 74' (pen.)		Mohd Amri Yahyah 15' 51'; Boško Balaban 33'; Rozaimi Abdul Rahman 55'

Darulmakmur Stadium, Kuantan, Pahang

Friday 14 September
20:45 UTC+08:00

PBDKT T-Team FC (Terengganu)	3 – 2	Pahang FA
Faiz Subri 29'; Marco Tulio 55'; Zairo 90'		Azamuddin 10'; Faizol Hussien 16'

Sultan Ismail Nasiruddin Shah Stadium, Kuala Terengganu, Terengganu
Friday 14 September
20:45 UTC+08:00

Selangor FA	2 – 0	Sarawak FA
Amri Yahyah 66' 73'

Shah Alam Stadium, Shah Alam, Selangor

== Knockout stage ==
=== Bracket ===
Quarterfinals
D2	Pahang FA	2	0	2
A1	(Singapore) LIONSXII	1	2	3
B2	ATM FA	3	3	6
C1	Negeri Sembilan	2	1	3
C2	(Kuala Lumpur) Felda United FC	1	2	3
B1	Kelantan FA	2	2	4
A2	Johor FC	1	1	2
D1	Selangor FA	3	2	5

Semifinals
A1	(Singapore) LIONSXII	1	1(4)	2(4)
B2	ATM FA (p)	1	1(5)	2(5)
B1	Kelantan FA	1	2	3
D1	Selangor FA	0	0	0

Final
B2	ATM FA	2
B1	Kelantan FA	3

== Quarterfinals ==
The first legs were played on 25,28 and 29 September, and the second legs were played on 2 October 2012.

=== First leg ===
Tuesday 25 September
20:45 UTC+08:00

Pahang FA	2 – 1	(Singapore) LIONSXII
Fauzi Roslan 9'; Hafiz Kamal 75'		Jalaluddin Jaafar 20' (o.g.)

Darulmakmur Stadium, Kuantan, Pahang
Attendance: 25,000

Friday 28 September
20:45 UTC+08:00

ATM FA	3 – 2	Negeri Sembilan FA
D. Christie Jayaseelan 56'; Bruno Martelotto 61'; Hairuddin Omar 80'		Firdaus Azizul 74'; Shakir Ali 89'

Majlis Perbandaran Selayang Stadium, Selayang, Selangor

Saturday 29 September
20:45 UTC+08:00

Felda United (Kuala Lumpur)	1 – 2	Kelantan FA
Khairan Ezuan 79'		Nurul Azwan 56'; Indra Putra 75'

Hang Jebat Stadium, Ayer Keroh, Malacca
Referee: Amirul Izwan yaakub (Perak)

Tuesday 25 September
20:45 UTC+08:00

Johor FC	1 – 3	Selangor FA
Akmal Nor 53'		Safiq Rahim 11'; Bunyamin Omar 21'; Amri Yahyah 24'

Pasir Gudang Corporation Stadium, Pasir Gudang, Johor

=== Second leg ===
Tuesday 2 October
20:45 UTC+08:00

LIONSXII (Singapore)	2 – 0	Pahang FA
Shahril Ishak 35' 79'

Jalan Besar Stadium, Kallang, Singapore
Attendance: 7,500
Referee: Teoh Hee Loon (Melaka)

LIONSXII won aggregate 3–2.

Tuesday 2 October
20:45 UTC+08:00

Negeri Sembilan FA	1 – 3	ATM FA
Alif Shamsudin 5'		Aidil Zafuan 9'; Marlon 42' 58'

Tuanku Abdul Rahman Stadium, Paroi, Negeri Sembilan
Referee: Zamzaidi Katimin (Melaka)

ATM FA won aggregate 6–3.

Tuesday 2 October
20:45 UTC+08:00

Kelantan FA	2 – 2	(Kuala Lumpur) Felda United
Norfarhan Mohamad 71'; Mohammed Ghaddar 93'		Antoine-Curier 43'; Mafry Balang 55' (o.g.)

Sultan Mohammad IV Stadium, Kota Bharu, Kelantan
Referee: Jefferi Zolkifli (Perak)

Kelantan FA won aggregate 4–3.

Tuesday 2 October
20:45 UTC+08:00

Selangor FA	2 – 1	Johor FC
S. Veenod 28'; Fitri Shazwan 82'		Fernando 64'

Shah Alam Stadium, Shah Alam, Selangor

Selangor FA won aggregate 5–2.

== Semi-finals ==
The first legs were played on 5 & 6 October, and the second legs were played on 11 & 12 October 2012.

=== First leg ===
Friday 5 October
20:45 UTC+08:00

LIONSXII (Singapore)	1 – 1	ATM FA
Safuwan Baharudin 81'		Marlon 55'

Jalan Besar Stadium, Kallang, Singapore
Attendance: 7,479
Referee: Suhaizi Shukri

Saturday 6 October
20:45 UTC+08:00

Kelantan FA	1 – 0	Selangor FA
Norfarhan Mohamad 62'

Sultan Mohammad IV Stadium, Kota Bharu, Kelantan
Attendance: 25,000
Referee: Mohd Yusof Mat Karim

=== Second leg ===
Thursday 11 October
20:45 UTC+08:00

ATM FA	1 – 1 (a.e.t.)	(Singapore) LIONSXII
Marlon 90+7'		Agu Casmir 27'
Penalties
Marlon (penalty scored); Aidil Zafuan (penalty missed); Rezal Zambery (penalty scored); K. Reuben (penalty scored); Bruno Martelotto (penalty scored); A. Varanthan (penalty missed); Fitri Omar (penalty scored)	5–4	(penalty scored) Khairul Amri; (penalty scored) Shahdan Sulaiman; (penalty scored) Hariss Harun; (penalty missed) Shaiful Esah; (penalty scored) Izwan Mahbud; (penalty missed) Baihakki Khaizan; (penalty missed) Yasir Hanapi

Majlis Perbandaran Selayang Stadium, Selayang, Selangor
Referee: Samsudin Ibrahim (Terengganu)

Aggregate 2-2, ATM FA won penalty shoot-out 5–4.

Friday 12 October
20:45 UTC+08:00

Selangor FA	0 – 2	Kelantan FA
		Mohammed Ghaddar 85'; Badri Radzi 90+3'

Shah Alam Stadium, Shah Alam, Selangor
Referee: Amirul izwan Yaakub (Perak)

Kelantan FA won aggregate 3–0.

== Final ==
The final was played on 20 October 2012 at the Shah Alam Stadium, Shah Alam in Selangor, Malaysia.

Saturday 20 October
20:45 UTC+08:00

ATM FA	2 – 3 (a.e.t.)	Kelantan FA
Rezal Zambery 49'; Marlon 62'		Norshahrul 44' 50'; Indra Putra 96'

Shah Alam Stadium, Selangor, Malaysia
Attendance: 80,925
Referee: Nafeez Abdul Wahab (Johor)

== Winners ==
2012 Malaysia Cup winner

2nd title

== Statistics ==
=== Top Scorer ===
Rank	Player	Club	Goals
1	(Saint Vincent and the Grenadines) Marlon Alex James	ATM FA	12
2	(France) Mickaël Antoine-Curier	(Kuala Lumpur) Felda United FC	6
3	(Malaysia) Mohd Amri Yahyah	Selangor FA	5
3	(Malaysia) Mohd Norfarhan Mohamad	Kelantan FA	5
3	(Cameroon) Jean-Emmanuel Effa Owona	Negeri Sembilan FA	5
3	(Malaysia) Mohd Fauzi Roslan	Pahang FA	5
3	(Argentina) Muriel Orlando	Johor FA	5
3	(Liberia) Patrick Wleh	(Kuala Lumpur) Sime Darby FC	5
4	(Croatia) Boško Balaban	Selangor FA	4
4	(Malaysia) Afiq Azmi	Kelantan FA	4
4	(Malaysia) Mohd Azamuddin Md Akil	Pahang FA	4
4	(Malaysia) Mohd Hafiz Kamal	Pahang FA	4
4	(Brazil) Arthuro Henrique Bernhardt	Johor FC	4
4	(Malaysia) Mohd Khyril Muhymeen Zambri	Kedah FA	4
5	(Malaysia) Mohd Badri Mohd Radzi	Kelantan FA	3
5	(Malaysia) Norshahrul Idlan Talaha	Kelantan FA	3
5	(Malaysia) Indra Putra Mahayuddin	Kelantan FA	3
5	(Malaysia) Mohd Safiq Rahim	Selangor FA	3
5	(Argentina) Bruno Martelotto	ATM FA	3
5	(Singapore) Shahril Ishak	(Singapore) LIONSXII	3
5	(Cameroon) Joël Epalle	Sarawak FA	3
5	(Malaysia) Zairo Anuar Zalani	(Terengganu) PBDKT T-Team FC	3
6	(Lebanon) Mohammed Ghaddar	Kelantan FA	2
6	(Malaysia) Mohd Nurul Azwan Roya	Kelantan FA	2
6	(Brazil) Maycon Carvalho Inez	Pahang FA	2
6	(Malaysia) Mohd Faizol Hussien	Pahang FA	2
6	(Malaysia) Mohd Alif Shamsudin	Negeri Sembilan FA	2
6	(Malaysia) Khairul Izuan Abdullah	Negeri Sembilan FA	2
6	(Malaysia) Mohd Nazri Mohd Kamal	Perak FA	2
6	(Cameroon) Albert Ebossé Bodjongo	Perak FA	2
6	(Brazil) Leandro Teofilo Santos Pinto	(Kuala Lumpur) Sime Darby FC	2
6	(Malaysia) Mohd Faiz Mohd Isa	(Kuala Lumpur) Sime Darby FC	2
6	(Malaysia) Hairuddin Omar	ATM FA	2
6	(Singapore) Khairul Amri	(Singapore) LIONSXII	2
6	(Malaysia) Mohd Farderin Kadir	(Kuala Lumpur) Felda United FC	2
6	(France) Helmi Loussaief	(Selangor) PKNS FC	2
6	(Liberia) Francis Forkey Doe	Terengganu FA	2
6	(Malaysia) Sharudin Yakup	Sarawak FA	2
6	(Malaysia) Shahrizal Saad	Johor FC	2
6	(Malaysia) Hadin Azman	Johor FA	2
