= Mohd Halim Napi =

Malaysian footballer and coach

Halim Napi
Personal information
- Full name: Mohd Halim bin Napi
- Date of birth: 11 June 1971 (age 55)
- Place of birth: Kota Bharu, Kelantan, Malaysia
- Height: 1.83 m (6 ft 0 in)
- Position: Goalkeeper

Team information
- Current team: Kelantan United F.C. (Goalkeeping coach)

Youth career
- 1991–1992: Kelantan President Cup Team

Senior career*
Years	Team	Apps	(Gls)
1993–1997	Kelantan	20	(0)
1997–1998	Negeri Sembilan	0	(0)
1998–1999	Kelantan	0	(0)
2000–2004	Kelantan JKR	0	(0)
2005–2009	Kelantan	100	(0)
Total		120	(0)

Managerial career
- 2010: Kelantan FA U21 (Goalkeeping coach)
- 2019–: Kelantan United F.C. (Goalkeeping coach)
- * Club domestic league appearances and goals as of 01:20, 10 February 2020 (UTC)

Mohd Halim Napi is a Malaysian former footballer who played as goalkeeper for Kelantan, Negeri Sembilan and Kelantan JKR. Halim was a versatile footballer. After retiring from Kelantan he became a goalkeeper coach for Kelantan FA U21 team.

Halim spent most of his career with Kelantan. In June 1994, he was suspended for the rest of the season because of a fight during a match against Selangor. He moved to Negeri Sembilan in 1995 and then joined Perak in 1996, playing with the club for the season. In August 1997, Halim was suspended, at first for life, by the Football Association of Malaysia for an incident with a referee; the ban was later reduced to one year on appeal. Upon the end of his suspension in 1998, Halim returned to the Kelantan net and earned recognition from the league's coaches for his strong performance.

Halim was suspended again in 2009, this time after he was accused of kicking and punching Negeri Sembilan's Aidil Zafuan following a cup match.

== Honours ==
=== Clubs ===
Kelantan

- Malaysia FAM Cup: 2005
- Malaysia Premier League: Promotion 2007–08
- Malaysia Cup: Runner-up 2009
