= 2009 Kelantan FA season =

Kelantan
2009 season
- President: Annuar Musa
- Head coach: B. Sathianathan
- Stadium: Sultan Muhammad IV Stadium, Kota Bharu (Capacity: 22,000)
- Malaysia Super League: 6th
- FA Cup: Runners-up
- Malaysia Cup: Runners-up
- Top goalscorer: League: Indra Putra Mahayuddin (14); All: Indra Putra Mahayuddin (30)
Home colours	Away colours

The 2009 season was Kelantan FA debut season in the Malaysia Super League. This article shows statistics of the club's players in the season, and also lists all matches that the club played in the season.

== Competitions ==
Win Draw Loss Postponed

=== Super League ===
Date	Opponents	H / A	Result F–A	Scorers	Attendance	League position
6 January 2009	UPB-MyTeam FC	A	4—2	Farhan 4', Ramzul 60', 80', Indra Putra 62'		
10 January 2009	Kuala Muda Naza FC	H	2—1	Indra Putra 45', Khalid 50'		
13 January 2009	PDRM FA	A	4—2	Indra Putra 32', Rizal 36' (o.g.), Rizal 63', Badhri 90'		
10 February 2009	Perak FA	A	3—2	Farhan 19', 89, Khalid Jamlus 26'		
14 February 2009	Terengganu FA	H	3—2	Indra Putra 4', Ku Rusydi 52' (o.g.), Badhri 59'		
17 February 2009	Pahang FA	A	5—1	Khalid 1', 74', Zairul 9', Badhri 61', Indra Putra 62'		
28 February 2009	Selangor FA	A	0—3			
21 March 2009	Penang FA	H	4—1	Farhan 23', 56', Ramzul 38', Badhri 65'		
31 March 2009	Negeri Sembilan FA	H	1—2	Indra Putra 79' (p)		
4 April 2009	Kedah FA	A	2—1	Farhan 61', Khalid 65'		
11 April 2009	Selangor FA	H	1—1	Indra Putra 45'		
2 May 2009	Negeri Sembilan FA	A	0—2			
12 May 2009	Johor FC	H	1—2	Nizad Ayub 23'		
16 May 2009	Perlis FA	A	0—2			
19 May 2009	Perlis FA	H	1—2	Indra Putra 19'		
23 May 2009	PLUS FC	A	0—2			
26 May 2009	PLUS FC	H	1—0	Zairul 35'		
16 June 2009	UPB-MyTeam FC	H	3—0	Badhri 13', Indra Putra 43', 61'		
20 June 2009	Kuala Muda Naza FC	A	1—0	Khalid 64'		
23 June 2009	PDRM FA	H	4—0	Ailim Fahmi 7', Indra Putra 45', Khalid 64', 80'		
27 June 2009	Perak FA	H	4—0	Indra Putra 35', 50', 76', Farhan 71'		
30 June 2009	Terengganu FA	A	0—2			
4 July 2009	Pahang FA	H	3—2	Azlan 21', Badhri 48', Zairul 65'		
7 July 2009	Penang FA	A	1—1	Rizal 46'		
21 July 2009	Kedah FA	H	0—1			
1 August 2009	Johor FC	A	1—2	Khalid 46'		

=== Results by match ===
Match	1	2	3	4	5	6	7	8	9	10	11	12	13	14	15	16	17	18	19	20	21	22	23	24	25	26
Ground	A	H	A	A	H	A	A	H	H	A	H	A	H	A	H	A	H	H	A	H	H	A	H	A	H	A
Result	W	W	W	W	W	W	L	W	L	W	D	L	L	L	L	L	W	W	W	W	W	L	W	D	L	L

Source: Malaysia Super League
A = Away; H = Home; W = Win; D = Draw; L = Loss

=== League table ===
Pos	Team	Pld	W	D	L	GF	GA	GD	Pts
4	Johor FC	26	15	3	8	53	27	+26	48
5	Terengganu	26	15	2	9	46	29	+17	47
6	Kelantan	26	14	2	10	49	36	+13	44
7	Negeri Sembilan	26	11	5	10	44	35	+9	38
8	PLUS	26	11	5	10	35	26	+9	38

Source: Results TM Liga Super and Rec.Sport.Soccer Statistics Foundation

=== FA Cup ===
The 2009 Malaysia FA Cup, known as the TM FA Cup due to the competition's sponsorship by Telekom Malaysia, is the 20th season of the Malaysia FA Cup, a knockout competition for Malaysia's state football association and clubs.

The FA Cup competition has reverted to the old format of play with no more open draws. It will comprise 29 teams 15 Super League and 14 Premier League sides with defending champions Kedah FA, Selangor FA and Terengganu FA receiving byes in the first round.

31 January 2009 First round 1	Kelantan FA	4–0	Johor FA	Sultan Muhammad IV Stadium
	Nor Farhan 8'; Khalid Jamlus 31', 52'; Indra Putra 56'	Report

3 February 2009 First round 2	Johor FA	3–0	Kelantan FA	Tan Sri Dato Haji Hassan Yunos Stadium
	Faizool Hussin 20'; Mohd Khairul 46'; Azrine 69'	Report

21 February 2009 Second round 1	Kelantan FA	5–1	PDRM FA	Sultan Muhammad IV Stadium
	Khalid Jamlus 11', 63'; Nor Farhan 68'; Indra Putra 80'; Ramzul Zahini 81'	Report

24 February 2009 Second round 2	PDRM FA	1–3	Kelantan FA	Majlis Perbandaran Selayang Stadium
	Sylvester Sidih 74'	Report	Rizal Fahmi 19'; Ramzul Zahini 60'; Nor Farhan 76'

3 March 2009 Quarter-final 1	MyTeam	1–1	Kelantan	MBPJ Stadium
	Aslam Haja 17'	Report	Indra Putra 10'

7 March 2009 Quarter-final 2	Kelantan	3–1	MyTeam	Sultan Muhammad IV Stadium
	Zamri Ramli 26'; Farhan 56'; Badhri Radzi 58'	Report	Norshahrul 10'	Attendance: 20,000

7 April 2009 Semi-final 1	Kelantan	0–1	Negeri Sembilan	Sultan Muhammad IV Stadium
		Report	Zaquan Adha 7'	Attendance: 20,000

18 April 2009 Semi-final 2	Negeri Sembilan	1–2	Kelantan	Tuanku Abdul Rahman Stadium
	Asyraf Al Japri 5'	Report	Farhan 48'; Indra Putra 52'	Attendance: 30,000

25 April 2009 Final	Kelantan	1–1; 1-4 (p)	Selangor	National Stadium, Bukit Jalil
	Indra Putra 61'; Indra Putra (penalty missed); Ezrie Shafizie (penalty scored); Zairul Fitree (penalty missed)	Report	Amri Yahyah 100'; (penalty scored) Khairul Anuar; (penalty scored) Nasriq Baharom; (penalty scored) D. Surendran; (penalty scored) Safee Sali	Attendance: 92,000; Referee: Subkhiddin Mohd Salleh

=== Malaysia Cup ===
The 2009 edition of Malaysia Cup started on 26 September 2009. Twenty teams took part in this prestigious competition. The teams were divided into five groups of four. The group leaders and the three best second-placed teams in the groups after six matches qualified to the quarterfinals.

==== Group E ====
Pos	Team	Pld	W	D	L	GF	GA	GD	Pts
1	Kelantan (Q)	6	5	0	1	12	4	+8	15
2	Kedah	6	3	1	2	9	3	+6	10
3	Penang	6	2	1	3	7	11	−4	7
4	ATM	6	0	2	4	5	15	−10	2

(Q) Qualified to quarterfinals

26 September 2009 Group Stage	Penang FA	1–2	Kelantan FA	Batu Kawan Stadium
	S. Thinagaran 39'	Report	Indra Putra 66' (pen.); Khalid Jamlus 73'

29 September 2009 Group Stage	Kelantan FA	1–0	Kedah FA	Sultan Muhammad IV Stadium
	Indra Putra 49'	Report

3 October 2009 Group Stage	ATM FA	1–2	Kelantan FA	Majlis Perbandaran Selayang Stadium
	Zahari Zaini	Report	Indra Putra 18' (pen.); Nor Farhan 90'

6 October 2009 Group Stage	Kelantan FA	2–1	Penang FA	Sultan Muhammad IV Stadium
	Khalid Jamlus 43'; Indra Putra 80'	Report	S. Chanthuru 65'

10 October 2009 Group Stage	Kedah FA	1–0	Kelantan FA	Darul Aman Stadium
	Sabree Abu 45'	Report

13 October 2009 Group Stage	Kelantan FA	5–0	ATM FA	Sultan Muhammad IV Stadium
	Che Hisamuddin 38'; Indra Putra 56', 71', 80'; Nor Farhan 59'	Report

20 October 2009 Quarter-finals	KL Plus	1–1	Kelantan FA	KLFA Stadium
	Fadzli Shaari 30'	Report	Indra Putra 13'	Attendance: 15,000

24 October 2009 Quarter-finals	Kelantan FA	3–0	KL Plus	Sultan Muhammad IV Stadium
	Indra Putra 10' (pen.); Nor Farhan 84', 86'	Report		Attendance: 15,000

27 October 2009 Semi-finals	Kelantan FA	2–0	Perlis FA	Sultan Muhammad IV Stadium
	Indra Putra 22'; Rizal Fahmi Rosid 88'	Report		Attendance: 25,000

31 October 2009 Semi-finals	Perlis FA	1–3	Kelantan FA	Utama Negeri Stadium
	Firdaus Fauzi 70'	Report	Nor Farhan 26', 53', 87'	Attendance: 20,000

7 November 2009 Final	Kelantan FA	1–3	Negeri Sembilan FA	National Stadium, Bukit Jalil
	Indra Putra 90+'	Report	Shahurain 18'; Hairuddin 46'; Zaquan Adha 60'	Attendance: 95,000; Referee: Mohd Yusof Mat Karim (Tentera)

== Player statistics ==
=== Squad, appearances and goals ===
No.	Nat	Positions	Total			League		Asia		FA Cup		Malaysia Cup	
No.	Nat	Positions	Players	Apps	Goals	Apps	Goals	Apps	Goals	Apps	Goals	Apps	Goals
Goalkeepers
	(Malaysia)	GK	Khairul Fahmi		0		0	-	-		0		0
	(Malaysia)	GK	Shahrizan Ismail		0		0	-	-		0		0
	(Malaysia)	GK	Halim Napi		0		0	-	-		0		0
Defenders
	(Malaysia)	DF	Hanif Md. Nor		0		0	-	-		0		0
	(Malaysia)	DF	Normizal Ismail		0		0	-	-		0		0
	(Malaysia)	DF	Farisham Ismail		0		0	-	-		0		0
	(Malaysia)	DF	Rizal Fahmi Rosid		4		2	-	-		1		1
	(Malaysia)	DF	Ahmad Azlan Zainal		1		1	-	-		0		0
	(Malaysia)	DF	Zairul Fitree Ishak		3		3	-	-		0		0
	(Malaysia)	DF	Mohd Zamri Ramli		1		0	-	-		1		0
	(Malaysia)	DF	Sharudy Aziz		0		0	-	-		0		0
	(Malaysia)	DF	Mohd Daudsu Jamaluddin		0		0	-	-		0		0
Midfielders
	(Malaysia)	MF	Rosairil Asrul Mat Nor		0		0	-	-		0		0
	(Malaysia)	MF	Nafuzi Zain		0		0	-	-		0		0
	(Malaysia)	MF	Mohd Saffuan Ibrahim		0		0	-	-		0		0
	(Malaysia)	MF	Mohd Badhri Mohd Radzi		7		6	-	-		1		0
	(Malaysia)	MF	Khairan Eroza Razali		0		0	-	-		0		0
	(Malaysia)	MF	Nor Farhan Muhammad		19		7	-	-		5		7
	(Malaysia)	MF	Wan Zaman Wan Mustapha		0		0	-	-		0		0
	(Malaysia)	MF	Ahmad Ezrie Shafizie		0		0	-	-		0		0
Forwards
	(Malaysia)	FW	Che Hisamuddin Hassan		1		0	-	-		0		1
	(Malaysia)	FW	Indra Putra Mahayuddin		30		14	-	-		5		11
	(Malaysia)	FW	Mohd Nizad Ayub		1		1	-	-		0		0
	(Malaysia)	FW	Zul Yusri Che Harun		0		0	-	-		0		0
	(Malaysia)	FW	Ramzul Zahini Adnan		5		3	-	-		2		0
	(Malaysia)	FW	Muhamad Khalid Jamlus		15		9	-	-		4		2
	(Malaysia)	FW	Mohd Faizol Che Noh		0		0	-	-		0		0
	(Malaysia)	FW	Mohd Ailim Fahmi Kamaruddin		1		1	-	-		0		0
Appearances = Total appearances
Last updated: 15 May 2016

Source: Competitions

=== Goalscorers ===
As of 28 December 2013

Rnk	Player	Super League	FA Cup	Malaysia Cup	Total
1	(Malaysia) Indra Putra Mahayuddin	14	5	11	30
2	(Malaysia) Nor Farhan Muhammad	7	5	7	19
3	(Malaysia) Khalid Jamlus	9	4	2	15
4	(Malaysia) Mohd Badhri Mohd Radzi	6	1	0	7
5	(Malaysia) Ramzul Zahini Adnan	3	2	0	5
6	(Malaysia) Rizal Fahmi Rosid	2	1	1	4
7	(Malaysia) Zairul Fitree Ishak	3	0	0	3
8	(Malaysia) Ahmad Azlan Zainal	1	0	0	1
8	(Malaysia) Mohd Zamri Ramli	0	1	0	1
8	(Malaysia) Che Hisamuddin Hassan	0	0	1	1
8	(Malaysia) Mohd Nizad Ayub	1	0	0	1
8	(Malaysia) Ailim Fahmi Kamaruddin	1	0	0	1
#	Own goals	2	0	0	2
Total		49	19	22	90

Source: Competitions

== Transfers ==
=== In ===
Date	Pos	No.	Player	From club	Transfer fee
October 2008	GK		(Malaysia) Khairul Fahmi Che Mat	(Malaysia) Harimau Muda	
October 2008	DF		(Malaysia) Mohd Daudsu Jamaluddin	Johor FC	
October 2008	DF		(Malaysia) Ahmad Azlan Zainal	Perak FA	
October 2008	MF		(Malaysia) Wan Zaman Wan Mustapha	PDRM FA	
October 2008	MF		(Malaysia) Nor Farhan Muhammad	PDRM FA	
October 2008	FW		(Malaysia) Che Hisamuddin Hassan	Terengganu FA	
October 2008	FW		(Malaysia) Muhamad Khalid Jamlus	Perak FA	
October 2008	FW		(Malaysia) Mohd Faizol Che Noh	PDRM FA	

=== Out ===
Date	Pos	No.	Player	To club	Transfer fee
October 2008	DF		(Malaysia) Mohd Hafizi Awang	Terengganu FA	
October 2008	DF		(Malaysia) Mohd Fitri Omar	(Selangor) PKNS FC	

== See also ==
- List of Kelantan FA seasons
