= 2010 Kelantan FA season =

Kelantan FA
2010 season
- President: Annuar Musa
- Head coach: B. Sathianathan
- Stadium: Sultan Muhammad IV Stadium, Kota Bharu (Capacity: 22,000)
- Super League: 2nd
- FA Cup: Second round
- Malaysia Cup: Champions
- Top goalscorer: League: Norshahrul Idlan Talaha (11); All: Norshahrul Idlan Talaha (14)
- Highest home attendance: 30,000 vs Selangor (15 October 2010)
- Lowest home attendance: 20,000 vs Johor (13 January 2010)
- Average home league attendance: 10,000
Home colours	Away colours

The 2010 season was Kelantan FA's 2nd consecutive season in the Malaysia Super League. This article shows statistics of the club's players in the season, and also lists all matches that the club played in the season. Kelantan's Super League season began with a 0–0 drawn to Terengganu FA.

== Competitions ==
Win Draw Loss Postponed

=== Super League ===
==== Results summary ====
Overall								Home						Away					
Pld	W	D	L	GF	GA	GD	Pts	W	D	L	GF	GA	GD	W	D	L	GF	GA	GD
26	17	8	1	50	14	+36	59	10	2	1	27	6	+21	7	6	0	23	8	+15

Last updated: 15 May 2011.

9 January 2010 MSL	Terengganu	0–0	Kelantan	Sultan Ismail Nasiruddin Shah Stadium
		Report

13 January 2010 MSL	Kelantan	3–0	Johor	Sultan Muhammad IV Stadium
	Akmal Rizal 2'; Badhri Radzi 49'; Indra Putra 57'	Match Report		Attendance: 20,000; Referee: Yusof Mat Karim

16 January 2010 MSL	Perlis	0–0	Kelantan	Utama Stadium
		Match Report

19 January 2010 MSL	Kelantan	0–1	Kedah	Sultan Muhammad IV Stadium
		Match Report	Azlan Ismail 41'	Attendance: 20,000

23 January 2010 MSL	Kelantan	4–1	Johor FC	Sultan Muhammad IV Stadium
	Norshahrul 18'; Azizi 46'; Indra Putra 50'; Farhan 72'	Match Report	Mohd Riduan Maon 21'	Attendance: 21,000

26 January 2010 MSL	Perak	0–0	Kelantan	Perak Stadium
		Report

30 January 2010 MSL	Kelantan	3–1	Penang	Sultan Muhammad IV Stadium
	Norshahrul 45', 50', 88' (pen.)	Report	V. Jaganathan 13'

6 March 2010 MSL	T-Team	0–1	Kelantan	Sultan Ismail Nasiruddin Shah Stadium
		Report	Azizi Matt Rose 73'

12 March 2010 MSL	Kelantan	0–0	Selangor	Sultan Muhammad IV Stadium
		Report

17 April 2010 MSL	Negeri Sembilan	1–3	Kelantan	Tuanku Abdul Rahman Stadium
	Shukor Adan 76'	Report	Indra Putra 29'; Daudsu 55'; Badhri Radzi 79'

20 April 2010 MSL	Kelantan	3–0	Kuala Lumpur	Sultan Muhammad IV Stadium
	Norshahrul 19', 23'; Badhri Radzi 48'	Report

24 April 2010 MSL	KL Plus FC	0–3	Kelantan	Petaling Jaya Stadium
		Report	Norshahrul 27', 39'; Hairuddin Omar 79'

4 May 2010 MSL	Kelantan	2–1	Pahang	Sultan Muhammad IV Stadium
	Norshahrul 43'; Hairuddin Omar 71'	Report	Nik Zul Aziz 53'

8 May 2010 MSL	Pahang	3–3	Kelantan	Darulmakmur Stadium
	Azamuddin Akil 34'; Hasmizan Kamarodin 37', 45'	Report	Farhan 6'; S. Chanturu 87'; Mohd Nizad Ayub 90'

11 May 2010 MSL	Johor	1–4	Kelantan	Tan Sri Dato Haji Hassan Yunos Stadium
	Rosaiful Nizam 21'	Report	Badhri Radzi 15', 44'; Indra Putra Mahayuddin 33'; Radzi Jasman 78' (o.g.)

15 May 2010 MSL	Kelantan	3–0	Terengganu	Sultan Muhammad IV Stadium
	Marzuki Yusof 78' (o.g.); Indra Putra Mahayuddin 30'; Norshahrul 36'	Report

22 May 2010 MSL	Kelantan	2–1	Perlis	Sultan Muhammad IV Stadium
	Norshahrul 29' (pen.); S. Chanturu 34'	Report	Wan Khairul Faiz 49'

25 May 2010 MSL	Kedah	0–0	Kelantan	Darul Aman Stadium
		Report

29 May 2010 MSL	Penang	1–3	Kelantan	Negeri Pulau Pinang Stadium
	Chun Keng Hong 22'	Report	Hairuddin Omar 66'; Akmal Rizal 75'; Che Hisamuddin 88'

1 June 2010 MSL	Kelantan	2–0	Perak	Sultan Muhammad IV Stadium
	Farhan 47'; Hairuddin Omar 90'	Report

6 July 2010 MSL	Kelantan	1–0	Negeri Sembilan	Sultan Muhammad IV Stadium
	Akmal Rizal 65'	Report

10 July 2010 MSL	Selangor	1–1	Kelantan	Shah Alam Stadium
	Amirul Hadi 59'	Report	Indra Putra 64'

17 July 2010 MSL	Kuala Lumpur	0–2	Kelantan	KLFA Stadium
		Report	Farhan 29'; Badhri Radzi 63'

28 July 2010 MSL	Kelantan	4–1	KL Plus FC	Sultan Muhammad IV Stadium
	Azizi Matt Rose 15'; Indra Putra 56'; Akmal Rizal 62'; Farhan 86'	Report	Rusydee 67'

31 July 2010 MSL	Johor FC	1–3	Kelantan	Pasir Gudang Corporation Stadium
	Nurul Azwan 35'	Report	Indra Putra 6' (pen.), 83'; Akmal Rizal 22'

3 August 2010 MSL	Kelantan	0–0	T-Team	Sultan Muhammad IV Stadium
		Report

==== League table ====
Pos	Team	Pld	W	D	L	GF	GA	GD	Pts
1	Selangor	26	20	3	3	62	23	+39	63
2	Kelantan	26	17	8	1	50	14	+36	59
3	Terengganu	26	15	5	6	51	27	+24	50
4	Johor FC	26	13	4	9	44	29	+15	43
5	Kedah	26	10	8	8	34	23	+11	38

Source: Results TM Liga Super
Rules for classification: 1) points; 2) goal difference; 3) number of goals scored.

=== FA Cup ===
16 February 2010 Second Round	Kedah	0–0	Kelantan	Darul Aman Stadium
		Report

20 February 2010 Second Round	Kelantan	1–1	Kedah	Sultan Muhammad IV Stadium
	Indra Putra 71'	Report	Baddrol Bakhtiar 74'

- Aggregate 1–1. Kelantan lost on away-goal rules.

=== Malaysia Cup ===
14 September 2010 Group stage	Kelantan	0–1	Negeri Sembilan	Sultan Muhammad IV Stadium
		Report	Halim Zainal 73'

17 September 2010 Group stage	PKNS	0–1	Kelantan	MBPJ Stadium
		Report	Akmal Rizal

20 September 2010 Group stage	Kelantan	3–3	KL Plus FC	Sultan Muhammad IV Stadium
	Indra Putra 35', 59'; Akmal Rizal 63'	Report

3 October 2010 Group stage	Negeri Sembilan	2–2	Kelantan	Tuanku Abdul Rahman Stadium
	Shahurain Abu Samah 24'; Abdul Halim Zainal 62' (pen.)	Report	Zairul Fitree 66'; Akmal Rizal 68'

6 October 2010 Group stage	Kelantan	4–0	PKNS	Sultan Muhammad IV Stadium
	Mohd Farisham Ismail 28'; Akmal Rizal 54'; Badhri Radzi 77'; Indra Putra 82' (pen.)	Report

9 October 2010 Group stage	KL Plus FC	0–4	Kelantan	MBPJ Stadium
		Report	Badhri Radzi; Norshahrul (2x); Rizal Fahmi

12 October 2010 Quarter Final 1	Selangor	0–0	Kelantan	Shah Alam Stadium
		Report

15 October 2010 Quarter Final 2	Kelantan	3–0	Selangor	Sultan Muhammad IV Stadium
	Farhan 14'; Akmal Rizal 25'; Badhri Radzi 77'	Report		Attendance: 30,000

- Kelantan won on aggregate 3–0.

20 October 2010 Semi Final 1	Kedah	0–0	Kelantan	Darul Aman Stadium
		Report

23 October 2010 Semi Final 2	Kelantan	1–0	Kedah	Sultan Muhammad IV Stadium
	Norshahrul 78'	Report

- Kelantan won on aggregate 1–0.

30 October 2010 Final	Negeri Sembilan	1–2	Kelantan	National Stadium, Bukit Jalil
	Shahurain Abu Samah 18' (pen.)	Report	Hairuddin Omar 57'; Badhri Radzi 65'	Attendance: 100,200; Referee: Subkhiddin Mohd Salleh

=== Group A ===
Pos	Team	Pld	W	D	L	GF	GA	GD	Pts
1	Negeri Sembilan FA (A)	6	4	2	0	10	6	+4	14
2	Kelantan FA (A)	6	3	2	1	14	6	+8	11
3	(Selangor) PKNS FC	6	2	0	4	6	12	−6	6
4	(Kuala Lumpur) KL Plus	6	0	2	4	7	13	−6	2

(A) Advanced to knockout stage

== Team officials ==
Position	Name
President	(Malaysia) (Kelantan) Annuar Musa
General Manager / Team Manager	(Malaysia) (Kelantan) Azman Ibrahim
Media Officer	(Malaysia) (Kelantan) Wan Badri Wan Omar
Head Coach	(Malaysia) (Negeri Sembilan) B. Sathianathan
Assistant Head Coach	(Malaysia) (Kelantan) Hashim Mustapha
Assistant Head Coach	(Malaysia) (Kelantan) Mohd Sideek A.Shamsudin
Goalkeeping Coach	(Malaysia) (Kelantan) Ismail Chawalit Abu Bakar
Physiotherapist	(Malaysia) Ahmad Faris Musa
Kit man/Equipment	(Malaysia) (Kelantan) Harun Ismail

== Player statistics ==
=== Squad ===
Last updated 23 May 2013

Key: = Appearances, = Goals, = Yellow card, (red card) = Red card

Number	Nation/State	Position	Name	Total			League			FA Cup			Malaysia Cup		
Number	Nation/State	Position	Name	Goal	Yellow card	Red card	Goal	Yellow card	Red card	Goal	Yellow card	Red card	Goal	Yellow card	Red card
1	(England) (Selangor)	GK	Syed Adney Syed Hussein	0			0			0			0		
2	(Malaysia) (Kelantan)	GK	Mohd Shahrizan Ismail	0			0			0			0		
3	(Malaysia) (Kelantan)	GK	Khairul Fahmi Che Mat	0			0			0			0		
4	(Malaysia) (Perlis)	DF	Azizi Matt Rose	3			3			0			0		
5	(Malaysia) (Kuala Lumpur)	DF	S. Subramaniam	0			0			0			0		
6	(Malaysia) (Kelantan)	DF	Mohd Rizal Fahmi Abdul Rosid	1			0			0			1		
7	(Malaysia) (Kelantan)	DF	Mohd Farisham Ismail	1			0			0			1		
8	(Malaysia) (Kelantan)	DF	Zairul Fitree Ishak	1			0			0			1		
9	(Malaysia) (Kelantan)	DF	Sarudy Aziz	0			0			0			0		
10	(Malaysia) (Kelantan)	DF	Mohd Zamri Ramli	0			0			0			0		
11	(Malaysia) (Kelantan)	DF	Mohd Daudsu Jamaluddin	1			1			0			0		
12	(Malaysia) (Kelantan)	MF	Mohd Badhri Mohd Radzi	10			6			0			4		
13	(Malaysia) (Kelantan)	MF	Mohd Shakir Shaari	0			0			0			0		
14	(Malaysia) (Kelantan)	MF	Khairan Eroza Razali	0			0			0			0		
15	(Malaysia) (Perak)	MF	Indra Putra Mahayuddin	13			9			1			3		
16	(Malaysia) (Terengganu)	MF	Mohd Nor Farhan Muhammad	6			5			0			1		
17	(Malaysia) (Kelantan)	MF	Zul Yusri Che Harun	0			0			0			0		
18	(Malaysia) (Kelantan)	MF	Wan Zaman Wan Mustapha	0			0			0			0		
19	(Malaysia) (Kelantan)	MF	Hairuddin Omar	5			4			0			1		
20	(Malaysia) (Kuala Lumpur)	MF	Ahmad Azlan Zainal	0			0			0			0		
21	(Malaysia) (Terengganu)	FW	Norshahrul Idlan Talaha	14			11			0			3		
22	(Malaysia) (Kedah)	FW	Akmal Rizal Ahmad Rakhli	10			5			0			5		
23	(Malaysia) (Kelantan)	FW	Mohd Nizad Ayub	1			1			0			0		
24	(Malaysia) (Kedah)	FW	Suppiah Chanturu	2			2			0			0		
25	(Malaysia) (Kelantan)	FW	Che Hisamuddin Hassan	1			1			0			0		
26	(Malaysia) (Kelantan)	FW	Mohd Ramzul Zahini Adnan	0			0			0			0		
Total				69			48			1			20		

=== Goalscorers ===
As of 21 January 2012

Rnk	Player	Super League	FA Cup	Malaysia Cup	Total
1	(Malaysia) (Terengganu) Norshahrul Idlan Talaha	11	0	3	14
2	(Malaysia) (Perak) Indra Putra Mahayuddin	9	1	3	13
3	(Malaysia) (Kelantan) Mohd Badhri Mohd Radzi	6	0	4	10
3	(Malaysia) (Kedah) Akmal Rizal Ahmad Rakhli	5	0	5	10
4	(Malaysia) (Terengganu) Mohd Nor Farhan Muhammad	5	0	1	6
5	(Malaysia) (Terengganu) Hairuddin Omar	4	0	1	5
6	(Malaysia) (Perlis) Azizi Matt Rose	3	0	0	3
7	(Malaysia) (Kedah) Suppiah Chanturu	2	0	0	2
8	(Malaysia) (Kelantan) Mohd Rizal Fahmi Abdul Rosid	0	0	1	1
8	(Malaysia) (Kelantan) Mohd Farisham Ismail	0	0	1	1
8	(Malaysia) (Kelantan) Zairul Fitree Ishak	0	0	1	1
8	(Malaysia) (Kelantan) Mohd Daudsu Jamaluddin	1	0	0	1
8	(Malaysia) (Kelantan) Che Hisamuddin Hassan	1	0	0	1
8	(Malaysia) (Kelantan) Mohd Nizad Ayub	1	0	0	1
#	Own goals	2	0	0	2
Total		50	1	20	71

Source: Competitions

== Transfers ==
All start dates are pending confirmation.

=== In ===
Pos.	Name	From	Fee
GK	(England) (Selangor) Syed Adney Syed Husain	(Malaysia) (Perak) MyTeam	
DF	(Malaysia) (Kuala Lumpur) S. Subramaniam	(Malaysia) (Perak) MyTeam	
DF	(Malaysia) (Perlis) Azizi Matt Rose	(Malaysia) Perlis	
MF	(Malaysia) (Kelantan) Mohd Shakir Shaari	(Malaysia) (Perak) MyTeam	
FW	(Malaysia) (Kedah) Akmal Rizal Ahmad Rakhli	(Malaysia) (Kedah) Kuala Muda Naza FC	
FW	(Malaysia) (Kedah) S. Chanturu	(Malaysia) Penang	

=== Out ===
Pos.	Name	From	Fee
GK	(Malaysia) (Kelantan) Halim Napi	Retired	
DF	(Malaysia) (Kelantan) Normizal Ismail		
DF	(Malaysia) (Kelantan) Hanif Md. Nor		
MF	(Malaysia) (Kelantan) Nafuzi Zain		
MF	(Malaysia) (Kelantan) Mohd Saffuan Ibrahim		
MF	(Malaysia) (Kelantan) Rosairil Asrul Mat Nor		
MF	(Malaysia) (Kelantan) Ahmad Ezrie Shafizie	(Malaysia) Johor	
FW	(Malaysia) (Kuala Lumpur) Muhamad Khalid Jamlus	(Malaysia) PDRM	
FW	(Malaysia) (Kelantan) Faizul Che Noh	(Malaysia) (Johor) MP Muar	

== See also ==
- List of Kelantan FA seasons

== See also ==
- List of Kelantan FA seasons
