= History of Kelantan FA =

Malaysian football club history

This article documents the history of Kelantan Football Association, a Malaysian association football team. For a general overview of the club, see Kelantan F.C.

Founded in 1946 as Kelantan Amateur Football Association (Malay: Persatuan Bola Sepak Amatur Kelantan) but records show this football association already existed as early as 1889. Kelantan FA is the oldest football team in the east coast of Malaysia. The team is based in Kota Bharu, in the state of Kelantan, traditionally a conservative Muslim area. The team have consistently been a decent team throughout their history, producing top-class national team players such as Mustafa Hashim, Hamid Ramli and Kamaruddin Hamzah.

The footballing landscape in Kelantan changed in 2007 when Annuar Musa took charge of the Kelantan Football Association leadership. His arrival brought several changes in terms of the team management, immediately seeing results as Kelantan went on to finish as runners up of the Malaysian Premier League in his first year. Therefore, they gained promotion into the country's top tier, the Malaysian Super League, for the 2009 season. Kelantan finished sixth in the league, leaving a strong impression by emerging as runners-up in both the Malaysia FA Cup and the Malaysia Cup.

Kelantan performed consistently in the league, finishing second and ending their silverware drought by lifting the Malaysia Cup. It was a momentous period in which Kelantan finally announced their arrival as a major powerhouse.

Then came 2011, when Kelantan lived up to expectations by winning the league title for the first time in their history, as well as reaching another Malaysia Cup final. The manager M. Karathu departed from his post, paving the way for Peter Butler to take charge.

Though Kelantan started the 2012 season with equally high expectations, the club got off to a controversial start after an apparent spat between Peter Butler and Annuar Musa. The Englishman was dismissed in favor of Croatian Bojan Hodak. Kelantan dominated Malaysian football by claiming a historic treble, while also reaching the quarter-finals of the AFC Cup in their maiden appearance. It was a fitting conclusion to a five-year span in which Kelantan evolved from the second division into perhaps the best side in Malaysia.

At Asian level, Kelantan had made three appearances in AFC Cup competition. The best performance was in 2012 where they lost to Iraqi Erbil in the quarterfinal.

== Early years (1986–06), presidential (2007–now) ==
In 1986, the Deputy Minister state of Kelantan, Datuk Haji Ahmad Rastom Haji Ahmad Maher led the association as the president until 1990. In 1991, Kelantan's State Secretary, Datuk Haji Wan Hashim Wan Daud took over the leadership after the state government changed hands. In 2004, the presidency changed hands after Datuk Ahmad Yaakub Jazlan became the president.

In 2005, Kelantan became the only team to play in the Malaysia FAM League, the third-tier football league after being relegated from the Premier League.

Beginning in 2007, the landscape of football in Kelantan began to change when Annuar Musa was entrusted to lead the Kelantan Football as the president for term of 2007–10. Annuar was called the father of football development in Kelantan. During his first year as the president, Kelantan showed improvements obtaining third place in the 2007–08 Malaysia Premier League. During the 2008 Malaysia Cup campaign, although Kelantan failed to qualify for the quarterfinal, the team showed improvement in the group stage.

Annuar resigned from the position of president on 8 November 2016.

On 17 December 2017, Bibi Ramjani Ilias Khan broke a Kelantan football tradition when she was selected as the first woman to head Kelantan Football Association since its establishment in 1946. She was the second woman in the country to be appointed as the president of a football association after Tunku Aminah Maimunah Iskandariah took the helm at Johor Darul Ta'zim in July 2016. KAFA deputy president Afandi Hamzah in announcing the appointment of Bibi Ramjani said the woman entrepreneur would be leading the association for the 2018 to 2021 term.

== Peter Butler (2008–09, 2011–12) ==
After the departure of French Régis Laguesse, Englishman Peter Butler was appointed as Kelantan coach on 28 September 2008. A former England and West Ham United player, he managed to make Kelantan unbeaten in the 2008–09 season. The game between Kelantan and KL PLUS was awarded 3–0 to KL PLUS as Kelantan could not agree on a suitable venue. However, the result was then revoked.

Butler managed to help Kelantan gain promotion to the Malaysia Super League, the top league in Malaysian football. In 2009, he led the team in the final of the Malaysia FA Cup for the first time since it was introduced in 1990. However, they lost to Selangor on penalties 1–4. He also managed to lead the team in the Malaysia Cup final during same year. Butler resigned as coach a week before the 2009 Malaysia Cup campaign.

On 15 November 2012, Butler was appointed as Kelantan coach for the second time after M. Karathu resigned from his position in late 2012. During his second stint, his best achievement was leading the team into the 2012 Malaysia Charity Shield final. However, the team lost to Negeri Sembilan 2–1.

== B. Sathianathan (2009–11) ==
Peter Butler suddenly resigned from his post on 29 February 2012, a week before the kick-off of the 2009 Malaysia Cup. The association appointed the former national team handler, B. Sathianathan to fill the post. Sathianathan led the team to the 2009 Malaysia Cup final where they lost 1–3 to Negeri Sembilan.

During the 2010 season, Sathianathan was retained as team head coach. He brought in several former Malaysia national players, such as Akmal Rizal and Hairuddin Omar into the team. However, he failed to lead the team to the FA Cup final when they lost to Kedah on the away goals rule. He brought the first major trophy in Kelantan history in 2010 by winning the prestigious Malaysia Cup by beating Negeri Sembilan 2–1.

Somewhere in 2010, Sathianathan was suspended for six months by Football Association of Malaysia for criticizing the league's fixture of 2009 season.

== M. Karathu (2011) ==
After Sathianathan was suspended for six months by the Football Association of Malaysia and was banned from involvement in any Malaysian football activities, M. Karathu was appointed to fill the post for the second time after the last time in 1993. Karathu, who was also the former Perak coach in 2009, brought more success to the team when Kelantan won their first Sultan Haji Ahmad Shah Cup and also clinched their first Malaysia Super League title in 2011.

Kelantan qualified to the 2011 Malaysia Cup final but lost to Terengganu. Karathu announced his resignation as coach after his side failed to win the 2011 Malaysia Cup. However, the reason given was that he wanted to spend time with his family.

== Bojan Hodak (2012–13) ==
After the withdrawal of Peter Butler from the post, Bojan Hodak became head coach of Kelantan. During the 2012 season, Kelantan won their first FA Cup title beating Sime Darby 1–0 in the final. Bojan managed to retain the Super League title in 2012. His biggest achievement with the team when Kelantan won their first treble title during 2012 season. Hodak also managed to retain the Malaysia FA Cup when Kelantan beat Johor Darul Takzim 1–0 in the 2013 FA Cup final.

The 2013 Malaysia Cup final against Pahang was his last match with the team. Hodak announced this during a press conference at the Shah Alam Stadium. The Croatian had won it all with The Red Warriors, capturing the treble Malaysian Super League, FA Cup, and Malaysia Cup in his debut year as a coach last for 2012 season.

== Steve Darby (2014) ==
During November 2012, Steve Darby a former Johor and Perak head coach was appointed as new Kelantan's head coach. He was replaced by George Boateng after a horrible 0–4 loss to Sime Darby.

== George Boateng (2014–15) ==
Tan Sri Annuar Musa officially confirmed the appointment via his official Facebook page, and George Boateng was assisted by six other coaches, including the current interim head coach Hashim Mustapha. The former Hull City skipper had a wealth of Premier League football experience and had also been capped by the Netherlands national team on four occasions.

His last playing stint in Malaysia with T-Team also helped his understanding of the local game. He was later replaced by Azraai Khor in the middle of the 2015 Malaysia Super League season.

== Azraai Khor (2015) ==
Azraai Khor came in the middle season to replace George Boateng. However his appointment could not help the team with only 1 win in the league during his management and his best achievement was becoming the 2015 Malaysia FA Cup runner up behind LionsXII. He resigned after a 0–3 loss to LionsXII.

== K. Devan (2016) ==
On 5 December 2015, K. Devan was officially introduced to the fans along with three of their new local players signing to play in the upcoming 2016 season. After an unsatisfactory performance shown by the team in the league, he made a decision to resign on 12 May 2016 citing personal reasons.

== Velizar Popov (2016) ==
On 12 May 2016, Kelantan FA hired former Maldives national team coach, Velizar Popov to handle the Super League side until the end of the 2016 season following former head coach K. Devan's resignation after an unsatisfactory performance of the team under his guidance. Bulgarian Popov was tasked to ensure Kelantan finish in the top four of the Super League and reach the semi-finals of the Malaysia Cup. He made his debut as Kelantan head coach playing against Selangor in the away match on 18 May in Shah Alam Stadium with an impressive performance played more than 70 min with 10 players after the red card of Wan Zack in the massive derby draw 0–0. Popov reached the most impressive and biggest win ever in the history of the club in away official match for Kelantan on 15 July against Terengganu with 6–1 in Kuala Terengganu in the East Coast Derby for the Malaysian Super League Week 14. Kelantan under Popov's guidance became the first team alongside Kedah to qualify for that year's Malaysia Cup quarter-finals after 3 wins and one draw in their first 4 matches in the group stage with 2 matches more left before the end. He left the club after his contract was not extended for 2017.

== Zahasmi Ismail (2017) ==
On 30 November 2016, Kelantan Football Association announced that former Kelantan player and interim head coach, Zahasmi Ismail, would return to "The Red Warriors" as their new head coach for M-League 2017. Kelantan had been without a head coach after Velizar Popov decided not to renew his contract with Kelantan due to the financial restrictions that Kelantan FA was having. The interim president of Kelantan FA, Afandi Hamzah stated that Zahasmi's appointment was made after several discussions were held between the two parties.

== Records (until 2017) ==
Season	League									Piala Sumbangsih	Piala FA	Piala Malaysia	AFC Cup	Top scorer	
Season	Division	P	W	D	L	F	A	Pts	Pos	Piala Sumbangsih	Piala FA	Piala Malaysia	AFC Cup	Name	Goals
1989	DIV 1	16	2	3	11	8	26	9	9th	–	N/A	–	–	—N/a	—N/a
1990	DIV 2	14	9	2	3	38	15	29	2nd	–	–	–	–	Mohd Hashim Mustapha; Boonphop Praphut	13
1991	DIV 1	18	6	1	11	24	40	19	10th	–	–	–	–	—N/a	—N/a
1992	DIV 2	14	5	4	5	27	18	19	3rd	–	–	–	–	Dariusz Dudala	9
1993	DIV 1	18	5	4	9	31	34	19	6th	–	–	SF	–	Mohd Hashim Mustapha	13
1994	LP	28	11	7	10	48	42	40	9th	–	–	GS	–	Mohd Hashim Mustapha	25
1995	LP	28	5	8	15	31	49	23	15th	–	–	–	–	Mohd Hashim Mustapha	11
1996	LP	28	4	5	19	18	52	17	15th	–	–	–	–	—N/a	—N/a
1997	LP	28	8	4	16	33	58	28	13th	–	R2	–	–	—N/a	—N/a
1998	LP 2	14	6	6	2	20	16	24	3rd	–	R2	–	–	—N/a	—N/a
1999	LP 2	18	7	5 (Note: Draw was followed by penalty shootout for additional point.)	6	23	26	29	5th	–	QF	–	–	—N/a	—N/a
2000	LP 2	18	10	6	2	48	21	36	1st	–	R2	QF	–	Anuar Abu Bakar	15
2001	LP 1	22	11	5	6	33	21	38	3rd	–	R1	SF	–	Anuar Abu Bakar	7
2002	LP 1	26	9	3	14	29	41	30	10th	–	R2	GS	–	Worrawoot Srimaka	15
2003	LP 1	24	7	7	10	31	52	28	10th	–	R1	GS	–	Fatrurazi Rozi	7
2004	LP	24	1	7	16	13	42	10	9th	–	R1	–	–	Khairul Zal Azmi Zahinudden	3
2005	Liga FAM (champions)									–	QF	–	–	—N/a	—N/a
2005–06	LP	21	7	5	9	33	35	26	6th	–	R2	–	–	—N/a	—N/a
2006–07	LP	20	4	8	8	23	31	20	8th	–	R2	GS	–	—N/a	—N/a
2007–08	LP	24	16	5	3	59	30	53	3rd	–	R1	GS	–	Mohamed Moustapha N'diaye	27
2009	LS	26	14	2	10	49	36	44	6th	–	RU	RU	–	Indra Putra Mahayuddin	14
2010	LS	26	17	8	1	50	14	59	2nd	–	R2	W	–	Norshahrul Idlan	11
2011	LS	26	17	5	4	52	21	56	1st	W	RU	QF	–	Norshahrul Idlan	18
2012	LS	26	18	6	2	53	18	60	1st	RU	W	W	QF	Mohammed Ghaddar	9
2013	LS	22	10	6	6	32	20	36	4th	RU	W	RU	R16	Mohd Badhri Mohd Radzi; Indra Putra Mahayuddin; Nor Farhan Muhammad	6
2014	LS	22	10	1	11	26	29	31	6th	–	SF	QF	GS	Francis Doe	5
2015	LS	22	8	4	10	34	38	28	9th	–	RU	GS	–	Gilmar	6
2016	LS	22	7	8	7	37	33	29	4th	–	R3	QF	–	Blazhe Ilijoski	14
2017	LS	22	7	4	11	31	39	22	10th	–	R2	GS	–	Khairul Izuan Rosli	5

Champions	Runners-up	Third Place	Promoted	Relegated

- P = Played
- W = Games won
- D = Games drawn
- L = Games lost
- F = Goals for
- A = Goals against
- Pts = Points
- Pos = Final position
- N/A = No answer
- LS = Liga Super
- LP = Liga Premier
- LP 1 = Liga Perdana 1
- LP 2 = Liga Perdana 2
- R1 = Round 1
- R2 = Round 2
- R3 = Round 3
- R4 = Round 4
- R5 = Round 5
- R6 = Round 6
- R16 = Round of 16
- GR = Group Stage
- QF = Quarter-finals
- SF = Semi-finals
- RU = Runners-up
- S = Shared
- W = Winners

== Cups ==
=== FA Cup ===
In 1993 Kelantan entered the semi-finals of the Malaysia FA Cup, but lost to Kedah. Kedah defeated Kelantan with a narrow 3–2 win to enter the finals. The two goals scored by Kelantan came from Hashim Mustapha and Tuan Kamree Tuan Yahya. While in reciprocal action in Kota Bharu, Kelantan lost 0–1. The referee during that game, Mohd Jamil Zakaria from Perak, was attacked by Kelantan supporters who were not satisfied with his decision. M. Karathu first eleven was Kamaruzaman Wan Mohamad, Zahasmi Ismail, Mustapha Aziz, S. Silvarajoo, Zami Mohd Nor, Mohd Zaidi, Tuan Kamree Tuan Yahya, Hashim Mustapha and assisted by 3 import players Dimitri Kalkalnov, Michael Anthony and Kraljevic Marco.

Kelantan won their first FA Cup title during 2012 Malaysia FA Cup campaign. They beat Premier League side Sime Darby with a 1–0 victory. Lebanese striker Mohammed Ghaddar scored the only goal of the match off a penalty kick, which was awarded rather controversially by referee Suhaiza Shukri in the 58th minute. It was a historic day for Kelantan football as the east coast side finally completed a collection of titles in the Malaysia League at the National Stadium, Bukit Jalil.

Kelantan retained the FA Cup during 2013 FA Cup final after defeating Johor Darul Takzim 1–0 in the final at the National Stadium, Bukit Jalil. Kelantan scored the goal in the 14th minute through midfielder Nor Farhan Muhammad through a pass from team captain, Badhri Radzi.

=== Malaysia Cup ===
Kelantan's 89-year losing streak of the Malaysia Cup ended in 2010 at National Stadium, Bukit Jalil on 30 October. They won 2–1 against Negeri Sembilan. Badhri Radzi scored the winning goal in the 65th minute. Kelantan's coach B. Sathianathan refused to commit his future to the newly crowned Malaysia Cup champions, due to waiting for the result of an appeal against a six-month ban. In 2012, the club won the Malaysia Cup trophy again after defeating newly promoted side, ATM FA 3–2 in the final.

== Sponsorship ==
For season running from 1984 to 2003, Dunhill was club's first shirt sponsor. However, it ended after tobacco sponsorship was banned in Malaysian football. Malaysia's telco, TM was the shirt sponsor from season 2004 to 2010. In the 2010 season, the main sponsors were Al-Hamra Group, Yusmira Trading, Sinar Harian, Air Asia and TM. The club's official sponsors since 2009 are shown below:

- 2009: Air Asia, Al-Hamra Group
- 2010: Air Asia, Al-Hamra Group, Yusmira Trading, Sinar Harian
- 2011: Happy Prepaid, Al-Hamra Group, TRW Station, Yusmira Trading, Sinar Harian, Al-Jabbar Group
- 2012: Happy Prepaid, Al-Hamra Group, Yusmira Trading, Sinar Harian, Masterskill, Snickers, RW Energy Isotonic, Mamee, Wana Group, Al-Jabbar Group
- 2013: Hotlink, Adabi, AzizanOsman.com, Sinar Harian, Syarikat Muda Osman, Mamee, Desa Murni Batik, Keropok Sira Cap Menara, Trésenergy.com, Pure're Spritz, Redbull, Wan Huzairil, Secretleaf, Yusri Maju Sdn. Bhd.
- 2014: Hotlink, UniKL, Adabi, Sinar Harian, Syarikat Muda Osman, Tresenergy, Konsortium Mutiara, Andida, Bayam Hospitality, Secretleaf, Yusry Maju, Hj Ali Home
- 2015: ChengalJati, Adabi, Sinar Harian, Puspamara, UniKL, redONE, Syarikat Muda Osman (SMO), A.Z.E & Groups Sdn Bhd, Airish Fashion Cosmetic, Mutiara Ekspress, Rennoil
- 2016: ChengalJati, Sinar Harian, Puspamara, UniKL, redONE, Azham Zamiri & Co., Puspamara, Mutiara Ekspress, HORC, Delima Perdana, PMB Investment Berhad, Vida Beauty
- 2017: redONE, Al Hamra Group, Glow Glowing, Chengal Jati, Yakult, Moccis Furniture, Puspamara, Ekspres Mutiara, Sinar Harian

== Kit manufacturer ==
The club's kit manufacturer in 2008 was Nike which lasted for a year. In 2009, Sportzone, a local manufacturer took charge. Ever since 2010, Umbro has been the manufacturer for this club.

In 2012, the club's kit manufacturer is Umbro and Warriors. Warriors has been the club only manufacturer since 2010 after Umbro has ended their sponsorship in 2012. The club partnership with Warriors ended in 2016 after 5 years becoming the club main kit manufacturer.

== Stadium ==
Kelantan FA was based at Sultan Muhammad IV Stadium in Kota Bharu, Kelantan. The capacity of the stadium is 22,000. This has been Kelantan FA's ground since 1946.

== See also ==
- Category:Kelantan F.C.
- Category:Kelantan F.C. players
