= List of Kelantan F.C. players =

Below is a list of footballers who have played or currently playing for Kelantan F.C..

== List of players ==
=== Local players ===
As of 17 November 2017

Name	Nationality	Position	Kelantan career	Appearances	Goals
Khairul Fahmi Che Mat	Malaysia	GK	2009–present	280	0 ^a
Mohd Shahrizan Ismail	Malaysia	GK	1995–1997, 1998–2001, 2008–2017	75	0
Ramadhan Hamid	Malaysia	GK	2016–present	15	0 ^a
Ahmad Syihan Hazmi Mohamed	Malaysia	GK	2017	0	0
Muhammad Syazwan Yusoff	Malaysia	GK	2011–2016	2	0
Faizol Nazlin Sayuti	Malaysia	DF	2014–present	7	0 ^a
Tuan Muhamad Faim	Malaysia	DF	2012–2016	6	0
Nik Shahrul Azim	Malaysia	DF	2011–present	92	1 ^a
Hasmizan Kamarodin	Malaysia	DF	2017	4	0
Mohamad Faris Shah Rosli	Malaysia	DF, MF	2016–present	15	0 ^a
Azwan Aripin	Malaysia	DF	2016–present	2	0 ^a
Farisham Ismail	Malaysia	DF	2004–2005, 2008–present	123	1 ^a
Muslim Ahmad	Malaysia	DF	2016	22	0
Norhafiz Zamani Misbah	Malaysia	DF	2015–2017	67	0
Zairul Fitree Ishak	Malaysia	DF	2005–2006, 2009–2017	123	1
Wan Zack Haikal	Malaysia	MF, ST	2015–2016	59	11
Wan Zaharulnizam Zakaria	Malaysia	MF	2014–2016	71	15
Fadhilah Pauzi	Malaysia	MF	2016–present	7	0 ^a
Shahrul Hakim	Malaysia	MF	2016–present	3	0 ^a
Syafiq Rahman	Malaysia	MF	2016–present	2	0 ^a
Nasharizam Rashid	Malaysia	MF	2016–present	1	0 ^a
Amir Zikri	Malaysia	MF	2016–present	3	0 ^a
Rozaimi Azwar	Malaysia	MF, FW	2015–present	11	0 ^a
Mohd Faizal Abu Bakar	Malaysia	MF	2016	4	0
Brendan Gan	Malaysia	MF	2014–2016	29	0
Mohd Badhri Mohd Radzi	Malaysia	MF	2006, 2008–present	356	95 ^a
Noor Hazrul Mustafa	Malaysia	DF, MF	2015–2016	31	2
Mohd Qayyum Marjoni Sabil	Malaysia	DF	2016–2017	43	0
Abdul Manaf Mamat	Malaysia	FW	2016	9	1
Khairul Izuan Rosli	Malaysia	FW	2011–2017	119	15
Syahrul Azwari Ibrahim	Malaysia	FW	2016	0	0
Mohd Hashim Mustapha	Malaysia	FW	1984–1995, 1998	–	38
Nik Ahmad Fadly Nik Leh	Malaysia	MF	2000–2001, 2006–2008	–	–
Amirizdwan Taj	Malaysia	DF	2015	18	1
Mohd Fitri Omar	Malaysia	DF, FW	2009, 2014–2015	28	1
Famirul Asyraf Sayuti	Malaysia	MF, FW	2014–2015	0	0
Muhd Nazri Ahmad	Malaysia	DF	2014–2015	13	0
Tengku Hasbullah Raja Hassan	Malaysia	DF, FW	2001–2003, 2014	–	–
Wan Rohaimi Wan Ismail	Malaysia	DF, FW	1997–1998, 2011	–	–
Amar Rohidan	Malaysia	MF	2014–2015	30	0
Mohamad Faiz Suhaimi	Malaysia	DF	2014	4	0
Ahmad Shakir Mohd Ali	Malaysia	FW	2014	17	7
Ahmad Fakri Saarani	Malaysia	ST, MF	2013–2015	43	10
Halim Napi	Malaysia	GK	1993–1997, 1998–1999, 2005–2009	–	–
Mohd Aslam Haja Najmudeen	Malaysia	MF	2012	5	0
Mafry Balang	Malaysia	DF, MF	2012	10	0
Zairo Anuar	Malaysia	MF	2013	29	2
Mohd Faiz Subri	Malaysia	FW	2013	28	5
Mohd Afiq Azmi	Malaysia	FW	2012	13	5
Azamuddin Akil	Malaysia	FW	2011	–	6
Mohd Zamri Ramli	Malaysia	DF	2009–2013	28	2
Khairan Ezuan Razali	Malaysia	DF	2011	7	0
Mohammad Abdul Aziz Ismail	Malaysia	DF	2011–2014, 2017	20	0
Danial Fadzly Abdullah	Malaysia	MF	2011	–	–
S. Subramaniam	Malaysia	DF	2010–2013	53	1
Solehin Kanasian Abdullah	Malaysia	MF	2010–2011	11	1
Akmal Rizal Ahmad Rakhli	Malaysia	FW	2010	18	10
Wan Zaman Wan Mustapha	Malaysia	MF	2004–2011	18	0
Zul Yusri Che Harun	Malaysia	MF	2007-2011	4	0
Khairan Eroza Razali	Malaysia	MF	2002–2011	65	5
Syed Adney	Malaysia	GK	2010–2011	13	0
Che Hisamuddin Hassan	Malaysia	FW	2009–2010	–	–
Chanturu Suppiah	Malaysia	MF, FW	2010–2012	53	12
Hairuddin Omar	Malaysia	FW	2010–2011	35	15
Mohd Nizad Ayub	Malaysia	FW	2007–2009, 2010–2011	63	11
Muhamad Khalid Jamlus	Malaysia	FW	2009–2010, 2011-2012	32	10
Mohd Haris Safwan Mohd Kamal	Malaysia	FW	2013	14	1
Indra Putra Mahayuddin	Malaysia	MF	2009–2010, 2012–2013, 2016–present	225	77 ^a
Mohd Nor Farhan Muhammad	Malaysia	MF	2009–2010, 2012–2013, 2015–present	209	48 ^a
Muhd Izuan Salahuddin	Malaysia	MF	2010–2013	16	3
Mohd Rizal Fahmi Abdul Rosid	Malaysia	DF	2006–2013	49	8
Azizi Matt Rose	Malaysia	DF	2010–2011, 2012–2013	44	2
Mohd Shakir Shaari	Malaysia	MF	2010–2013	107	6
Mohd Daudsu Jamaluddin	Malaysia	DF	2009–2013, 2016–2017	77	2
Mohd Nurul Azwan Roya	Malaysia	MF	2011–2012	39	10
Norshahrul Idlan Talaha	Malaysia	FW	2010–2012	70	36
Mohd Ramzul Zahini Adnan	Malaysia	FW	2007–2012	14	3
Fakhrul Zaman	Malaysia	FW	2016–present	10	1 ^a
Danial Ashraf	Malaysia	FW	2016–present	17	2 ^a
K. Nanthakumar	Malaysia	MF	2013	7	0

==== Note ====
^a – Ongoing

=== Foreign players ===
As of 17 November 2017

Name	Nationality	Position	Kelantan career	Appearances	Goals
Abou Bakr Al-Mel	Lebanon	FW	2017	14	4
Mamadou Danso	The Gambia	DF	2017	29	1
Alessandro Celin	Brazil	FW	2017	19	4
Morgaro Gomis	Senegal	MF	2016–present	42	1 ^a
Wander Luiz Bitencourt Junior	Brazil	MF, FW	2016	16	5
Jonathan McKain	Australia	DF, MF	2015–2016	39	3
Baže Ilijoski	North Macedonia	FW	2016	26	16
Dramane Traore	Mali	FW	2016	13	3
Jonatan Lucca	Brazil	MF	2016	10	0
Austin Amutu	Nigeria	FW	2015	19	9
Gilmar Jose da Silva Filho	Brazil	FW	2015	29	11
Isaac Pupo	Liberia	MF	2015	0	0
Emmanuel Kenmogne	Cameroon	FW	2015	10	1
Erwin Carrillo	Colombia	FW	2015	26	6
Hussein Alaa Hussein	Iraq	DF	2014	27	1
Francis Doe	Liberia	FW	2014	38	13
Mohamed Shawky	Egypt	MF	2014	16	8
Obinna Nwaneri	Nigeria	DF	2013	75	9
Arcadia Toe	Liberia	FW	2004–2005	–	–
Dickson Nwakaeme	Nigeria	FW	2013	25	13
Suriya Domtaisong	Thailand	FW	2005–2006	24	6
Lek Kcira	Croatia	DF	2013	6	0
Marko Kraljević	Croatia	FW	1991–1993	-	-
Dimitri Petratos	Australia	MF	2013	11	4
Mohammed Ghaddar	Lebanon	FW	2012, 2014, 2017	98	50
Sarif Sainui	Thailand	FW	2005–2006	26	13
Alexander Freeman	Liberia	MF	1995–1996	-	-
Onyekachi Nwoha	Nigeria	FW	2012	5	4
Mohamed Moustapha N'diaye	Senegal	FW	2008	33	32
David Le Bras	France	MF, DF	2008	31	27
Gerry Gomez	Australia	DF	1994	-	
Dariusz Dudala	Poland	FW	1992	-	9
Zakaria Charara	Lebanon	MF	2012	0	0
Dimitre Kalkanov	Bulgaria	DF, MF	1993	-	-
Patricio Acevedo	Chile	MF	2006–2007	-	-
Robby Darwis	Indonesia	DF	2000–2001	20	0
V. Sundramoorthy	Singapore	MF, FW	1994	-	-
Sandro Radun	Croatia	GK	1994	-	-
Keita Mandjou	Guinea	FW	2013	10	4
Mohammed Muyei	Niger	FW	2003–2005	47	19
Denny Antwi	Ghana	FW	2012	13	2
Emmanuel Okine	Ghana	MF	2012	1	0
Worrawoot Srimaka	Thailand	FW	2005–2006	29	7
Boonphup Praphut	Thailand	FW	1990	-	13
Haruna Al Hassan	Niger	DF	2004–2006	-	-
Jan Nečas	Czechoslovakia	MF	2008	-	-
Miroslav Nikolic	Croatia	-	1991	-	-
Martin Adamec	Slovakia	-	2003	-	-
Riyadh Abbas	Iraq	-	1996	-	-
Ishaq Debrah	Ghana	-	1995	-	-
Edward Abougye	Ghana	-	1995	-	-
Mijo Dadić	Croatia	DF	2012	8	0
Michael Roki	Australia	-	1993	-	-
Grzegorz Kowalski	Poland	MF, DF	1992	-	3
Anan Phangseng	Thailand	-	1990	-	-
Prasert Changmool	Thailand	-	1990	-	-
Razali Rashid	Singapore	-	1989	-	-
Ahmad Ibrahim Maksudi	Singapore	-	1989	-	-
Robby Darwis	Indonesia	-	1989	-	-

==== Notes ====
^a - Ongoing

== Key to positions ==
GK	Goalkeeper	DF	Defender	MF	Midfielder	FW	Forward
