= 2010 Malaysia Cup =

Piala Malaysia 2010

Tournament details
- Country: Malaysia
- Teams: 16

Final positions
- Champions: Kelantan (1st title)
- Runners-up: Negeri Sembilan

Tournament statistics
- Matches played: 61

The 2010 Malaysia Cup (Malay: Piala Malaysia 2010) was the 84th edition of the Malaysia Cup. The competition began on 14 September 2010 and concluded on 30 October 2010 with the final, held at National Stadium, Bukit Jalil. A total of 16 teams took part in the competition. The teams were divided into 4 groups of 4 teams. The group leaders and runners-up teams in the groups after 6 matches qualified to the quarterfinals.

== Qualifications ==
Only 16 teams qualified for the 2010 edition of the Malaysia Cup; 12 teams from Malaysia Super League and 4 teams from Malaysia Premier League. The teams were:-

Malaysia Super League

- Selangor
- Kelantan FA
- Terengganu FA
- Johor FC
- (Terengganu) PBDKT T-Team FC
- Kedah FA
- Negeri Sembilan FA
- Pahang FA
- (Kuala Lumpur) KL PLUS FC
- Kuala Lumpur FA
- Perak FA
- Perlis FA

Malaysia Premier League

- (Kuala Lumpur) Felda United FC
- Sabah FA
- (Selangor) PKNS FC
- (Federal Territories of Malaysia) ATM FA

== Group stage ==
=== Group A ===
Pos	Team	Pld	W	D	L	GF	GA	GD	Pts
1	Negeri Sembilan FA (A)	6	4	2	0	10	6	+4	14
2	Kelantan FA (A)	6	3	2	1	14	6	+8	11
3	(Selangor) PKNS FC	6	2	0	4	6	12	−6	6
4	(Kuala Lumpur) KL Plus	6	0	2	4	7	13	−6	2

(A) Advanced to knockout stage

==== First leg ====
14 September 2010
20:45

Kelantan	0–1	Negeri Sembilan

Sultan Mohammad IV Stadium, Kota Bharu

14 September 2010
20:45

KL Plus	0–1	PKNS

MBPJ Stadium, Kelana Jaya

17 September 2010
20:45

Negeri Sembilan	1–1	KL Plus

Tuanku Abdul Rahman Stadium, Paroi

17 September 2010
20:45

PKNS	0–1	Kelantan
		Akmal

MBPJ Stadium, Kelana Jaya

20 September 2010
20:45

PKNS	1–2	Negeri Sembilan

MBPJ Stadium, Kelana Jaya

20 September 2010
20:45

Kelantan	3–3	KL Plus
Indra Putra 35', 59'; Akmal 63'

Sultan Mohammad IV Stadium, Kota Bharu

==== Second leg ====
3 October 2010
20:45

Negeri Sembilan	2–2	Kelantan

Tuanku Abdul Rahman Stadium, Paroi

3 October 2010
20:45

PKNS	3–2	KL Plus

MBPJ Stadium, Kelana Jaya

6 October 2010
20:45

KL Plus	1–2	Negeri Sembilan

MBPJ Stadium, Kelana Jaya

6 October 2010
20:45

Kelantan	4–0	PKNS
Farisham 28'; Akmal 54'; Badhri 77'; Indra Putra 82'(pen)

Sultan Mohammad IV Stadium, Kota Bharu

9 October 2010
20:45

Negeri Sembilan	3–1	PKNS

Tuanku Abdul Rahman Stadium, Paroi

9 October 2010
20:45

KL Plus	0–4	Kelantan
		Badhri; Norshahrul(2); Rizal Fahmi

MBPJ Stadium, Kelana Jaya

=== Group B ===
Pos	Team	Pld	W	D	L	GF	GA	GD	Pts
1	Terengganu FA (A)	6	3	1	2	10	7	+3	10
2	Pahang FA (A)	6	3	1	2	10	8	+2	10
3	Sabah FA	6	2	3	1	8	8	0	9
4	Kuala Lumpur FA	6	1	1	4	6	10	−4	4

(A) Advanced to knockout stage

==== First leg ====
14 September 2010
20:45

Terengganu	1–3	Pahang
79'		12'; 68'; 88'

Sultan Ismail Nasiruddin Shah Stadium, Kuala Terengganu

14 September 2010
20:45

KL	0–0	Sabah

KLFA Stadium, Cheras

17 September 2010
20:45

Sabah	2–2	Terengganu
45'; 55'		75'; 77'

Likas Stadium, Sabah

20 September 2010
20:45

Sabah	2–0	Pahang
73'; 83'

Likas Stadium, Sabah

20 September 2010
20:45

Terengganu	0–1	KL
		67' Azidan Sarudin

Sultan Ismail Nasiruddin Shah Stadium, Kuala Terengganu

26 September 2010
20:45

Pahang	5–2	KL
32'; 45'; 63'; 69'; 84'		66'; 67'

Darulmakmur Stadium, Kuantan

==== Second leg ====
3 October 2010
20:45

Pahang	0–2	Terengganu
		20'; 25'

Darulmakmur Stadium, Kuantan

3 October 2010
20:45

Sabah	3–2	KL
6'; 21'; 90'		76'; 80'

Likas Stadium, Sabah

6 October 2010
20:45

KL	0–1	Pahang
		53'

KLFA Stadium, Cheras

6 October 2010
20:45

Terengganu	3–0	Sabah
Manaf Mamat 34' 46'; Wan Aliff Jasmi 68'

Sultan Ismail Nasiruddin Shah Stadium, Kuala Terengganu

9 October 2010
20:45

Pahang	1–1	Sabah
80'		83'

Darulmakmur Stadium, Kuantan

9 October 2010
20:45

KL	1–2	Terengganu
Badrul Hisyam 46'		Marzuki Yusof 27'; Ashari 90'

KLFA Stadium, Cheras

=== Group C ===
Pos	Team	Pld	W	D	L	GF	GA	GD	Pts
1	Johor FC (A)	6	3	3	0	7	3	+4	12
2	Kedah FA (A)	6	2	3	1	8	3	+5	9
3	Perak FA	6	2	1	3	4	7	−3	7
4	(Federal Territories of Malaysia) ATM FA	6	0	3	3	5	11	−6	3

(A) Advanced to knockout stage

==== First leg ====
14 September 2010
20:45

Perak	2–2	Angkatan Tentera Malaysia

Perak Stadium, Ipoh

14 September 2010
20:45

Johor FC	1–1	Kedah

Pasir Gudang Corporation Stadium, Pasir Gudang

17 September 2010
20:45

Kedah	2–0	Perak

Darul Aman Stadium, Alor Setar

17 September 2010
20:45

Angkatan Tentera Malaysia	1–1	Johor FC

MPS Stadium, Selayang

20 September 2010
20:45

Johor FC	2–0	Perak

Pasir Gudang Corporation Stadium, Pasir Gudang

20 September 2010
20:45

Angkatan Tentera Malaysia	1–1	Kedah

MPS Stadium, Selayang

==== Second leg ====
3 October 2010
20:45

Angkatan Tentera Malaysia	0–1	Perak

MPS Stadium, Selayang

3 October 2010
20:45

Kedah	0–0	Johor FC

Darul Aman Stadium, Alor Setar

6 October 2010
20:45

Perak	1–0	Kedah

Perak Stadium, Ipoh

6 October 2010
20:45

Johor FC	2–1	Angkatan Tentera Malaysia

Pasir Gudang Corporation Stadium, Pasir Gudang

9 October 2010
20:45

Perak	0–1	Johor FC

Perak Stadium, Ipoh

9 October 2010
20:45

Kedah	4–0	Angkatan Tentera Malaysia

MPS Stadium, Selayang

=== Group D ===
Pos	Team	Pld	W	D	L	GF	GA	GD	Pts
1	Selangor FA (A)	6	6	0	0	16	4	+12	18
2	Perlis FA (A)	6	3	0	3	12	10	+2	9
3	(Terengganu) PBDKT T-Team FC	6	2	1	3	10	11	−1	7
4	(Kuala Lumpur) Felda United FC	6	0	1	5	6	19	−13	1

(A) Advanced to knockout stage

==== First leg ====
14 September 2010
20:45

Selangor	3–1	(Terengganu) T-Team

Shah Alam Stadium, Selangor

14 September 2010
20:45

Perlis	3–2	Felda United

Utama Negeri Stadium, Kangar

17 September 2010
20:45

T-Team	4–0	Perlis

Sultan Ismail Nasiruddin Shah Stadium, Kuala Terengganu

17 September 2010
20:45

Felda United	1–4	Selangor

KLFA Stadium, Cheras

20 September 2010
20:45

Felda United	1–2	T-Team

KLFA Stadium, Cheras

20 September 2010
20:45

Selangor	1–0	Perlis

Shah Alam Stadium, Selangor

==== Second leg ====
3 October 2010
20:45

T-Team	1–2	Selangor

Sultan Ismail Nasiruddin Shah Stadium, Kuala Terengganu

3 October 2010
20:45

Felda United	0–5	Perlis

KLFA Stadium, Cheras

6 October 2010
20:45

Perlis	4–1	T-Team

Utama Negeri Stadium, Kangar

6 October 2010
20:45

Selangor	4–1	Felda United

Shah Alam Stadium, Selangor

9 October 2010
20:45

T-Team	1–1	Felda United

Sultan Ismail Nasiruddin Shah Stadium, Kuala Terengganu

9 October 2010
20:45

Perlis	0–2	Selangor

Utama Negeri Stadium, Kangar

== Knockout stage ==
=== Bracket ===
Quarterfinals
A1	Negeri Sembilan	1	3	4
D2	Perlis	0	1	1
B1	Johor FC	1	1	2*
C2	Pahang	0	2	2
C1	Terengganu	2	0	2
B2	Kedah	2	3	5
D1	Selangor	0	0	0
A2	Kelantan	0	3	3

Semifinals
A1	Negeri Sembilan	0	2	2
C1	Johor FC	1	0	1
C2	Kedah	0	0	0
A2	Kelantan	0	1	1

Final
A1	Negeri Sembilan	1
A2	Kelantan	2

- Aggregate 2–2. Johor FC won on away-goal rules.

=== Quarterfinals ===
==== First leg ====
12 October 2010
20:45

Negeri Sembilan	1–0	Perlis

Tuanku Abdul Rahman Stadium, Paroi

12 October 2010
20:45

Terengganu	2–2	Kedah
Joseph; Firdaus Faudzi		Baddrol; Fikri Isa

Sultan Ismail Nasiruddin Shah Stadium, Kuala Terengganu

12 October 2010
20:45

Johor FC	1–0	Pahang

Pasir Gudang Corporation Stadium, Pasir Gudang

12 October 2010
20:45

Selangor	0–0	Kelantan

Shah Alam Stadium, Selangor

==== Second leg ====
15 October 2010
20:45

Kelantan	3–0	Selangor
Farhan 14'; Akmal 25'; Badri 77'

Sultan Mohammad IV Stadium, Kota Bharu
Attendance: 30,000

16 October 2010
20:45

Perlis	1–3	Negeri Sembilan

Utama Negeri Stadium, Kangar

16 October 2010
20:45

Kedah	3–0	Terengganu
Baddrol 62'; Sabre Abu 68'; Khyril Muhymeen 83'

Darul Aman Stadium, Alor Setar

16 October 2010
20:45

Pahang	2–1	Johor FC

Darulmakmur Stadium, Kuantan
Attendance: 10,000

=== Semi-finals ===
==== First leg ====
20 October 2010
20:45

Negeri Sembilan	0–1	Johor FC

Tuanku Abdul Rahman Stadium, Paroi

20 October 2010
20:45

Kedah	0–0	Kelantan

Darul Aman Stadium, Alor Setar

==== Second leg ====
23 October 2010
20:45

Johor FC	0–2	Negeri Sembilan
		Shukor Adan 36'; Shahurain Abu Samah 61' (pen.)

Pasir Gudang Corporation Stadium, Pasir Gudang
Referee: Nagoor Amir Noor Mohamed

23 October 2010
20:45

Kelantan	1–0	Kedah
Norshahrul Idlan 78'

Sultan Mohammad IV Stadium, Kota Bharu

== Final ==
30 October 2010
20:45

Negeri Sembilan	1–2	Kelantan
Shahurain Abu Samah 18' (pen.)	Report	Hairuddin Omar 57' Mohd Badri Mohd Radzi 65'

National Stadium, Bukit Jalil, Kuala Lumpur
Attendance: 100,200
Referee: Subkhiddin Mohd Salleh

== Winners ==
2010 Malaysia Cup Champions
(Kelantan)

Kelantan FC
1st title
