= 2009 Malaysia Cup =

Tournament details
- Country: Malaysia

The 2009 Malaysia Cup (Malay: Piala Malaysia 2009) was the 83rd edition of the Malaysia Cup. The competition began on 26 September 2009. Twenty teams took part in the competition. The teams were divided into five groups of four teams. The group leaders and the three best second-placed teams in the groups after six matches qualified to the quarterfinals.

== Group stage ==
=== Group A ===
Pos	Team	Pld	W	D	L	GF	GA	GD	Pts
1	KL Plus (Q)	6	4	1	1	14	5	+9	13
2	Perlis (Q)	6	4	1	1	13	5	+8	13
3	Pahang	6	1	3	2	14	11	+3	6
4	Malacca	6	0	1	5	4	24	−20	1

(Q) Qualified to quarterfinals

September 26, 2009
Malacca	0–2	Perlis
Pahang	1–1	KL Plus
September 29, 2009
KL Plus	4–1	Malacca
Perlis	3–2	Pahang
October 3, 2009
Malacca	3–3	Pahang
Perlis	1–2	KL Plus
October 6, 2009
KL Plus	3–1	Pahang
Perlis	5–0	Malacca
October 10, 2009
Malacca	0–4	KL Plus
Pahang	1–1	Perlis
October 13, 2009
Pahang	6–0	Malacca
KL Plus	0–1	Perlis

=== Group B ===
Pos	Team	Pld	W	D	L	GF	GA	GD	Pts
1	Negeri Sembilan (Q)	6	6	0	0	15	1	+14	18
2	Terengganu (Q)	6	4	0	2	14	5	+9	12
3	Johor	6	2	0	4	12	11	+1	6
4	Sarawak	6	0	0	6	1	26	−25	0

(Q) Qualified to quarterfinals

September 26, 2009
Sarawak	0–1	Terengganu
Johor	1–2	Negeri Sembilan
September 29, 2009
Negeri Sembilan	8–0	Sarawak
Terengganu	1–2	Johor
October 3, 2009
Terengganu	0–1	Negeri Sembilan
Sarawak	1–4	Johor
October 6, 2009
Terengganu	7–0	Sarawak
Negeri Sembilan	1–0	Johor
October 10, 2009
Sarawak	0–1	Negeri Sembilan
Johor	2–4	Terengganu
October 13, 2009
Johor	5–0	Sarawak
Negeri Sembilan	2–0	Terengganu

=== Group C ===
Pos	Team	Pld	W	D	L	GF	GA	GD	Pts
1	Johor FC (Q)	6	4	1	1	14	6	+8	13
2	Perak	6	3	2	1	11	4	+7	11
3	Kuala Lumpur	6	1	2	3	3	9	−6	5
4	MyTeam	6	1	1	4	7	16	−9	4

(Q) Qualified to quarterfinals

September 26, 2009
Kuala Lumpur	0–1	Johor FC
MyTeam	0–1	Perak
September 29, 2009
Johor FC	4–1	MyTeam
Perak	0–1	Kuala Lumpur
October 3, 2009
Johor FC	0–2	Perak
Kuala Lumpur	0–0	MyTeam
October 6, 2009
Johor FC	4–0	Kuala Lumpur
Perak	6–1	MyTeam
October 10, 2009
Kuala Lumpur	1–1	Perak
MyTeam	2–4	Johor FC
October 13, 2009
Perak	1–1	Johor FC
MyTeam	3–1	Kuala Lumpur

=== Group D ===
Pos	Team	Pld	W	D	L	GF	GA	GD	Pts
1	Selangor (Q)	6	4	1	1	15	8	+7	13
2	Kuala Muda Naza FC (Q)	6	4	0	2	13	8	+5	12
3	PDRM	6	1	2	3	5	12	−7	5
4	Sabah FA	6	1	1	4	7	12	−5	4

(Q) Qualified to quarterfinals

September 26, 2009
Sabah	0–1	Selangor
PDRM	1–0	Kuala Muda Naza
September 29, 2009
Kuala Muda Naza	2–1	Sabah
Selangor	3–0	PDRM
October 2, 2009
Selangor	3–2	Kuala Muda Naza
October 3, 2009
Sabah	2–0	PDRM
October 6, 2009
Selangor	4–1	Sabah
Kuala Muda Naza	3–0	PDRM
October 10, 2009
PDRM	2–2	Selangor
Sabah	1–3	Kuala Muda Naza
October 13, 2009
Kuala Muda Naza	3–2	Selangor
PDRM	2–2	Sabah

=== Group E ===
Pos	Team	Pld	W	D	L	GF	GA	GD	Pts
1	Kelantan (Q)	6	5	0	1	12	4	+8	15
2	Kedah	6	3	1	2	9	3	+6	10
3	Penang	6	2	1	3	7	11	−4	7
4	ATM	6	0	2	4	5	15	−10	2

(Q) Qualified to quarterfinals

September 26, 2009
Kedah	1–1	ATM
Penang	1–2	Kelantan
September 29, 2009
ATM	1–1	Penang
Kelantan	1–0	Kedah
October 3, 2009
ATM	1–2	Kelantan
Kedah	0–1	Penang
October 6, 2009
ATM	0–3	Kedah
Kelantan	2–1	Penang
October 10, 2009
Kedah	1–0	Kelantan
Penang	3–2	ATM
October 13, 2009
Penang	0–4	Kedah
Kelantan	5–0	ATM

== Second-placed qualifiers ==
At the end of the group stage, a comparison was made between the second placed teams. The three best second-placed teams advanced to the quarter-finals.

Group	Team	Pld	W	D	L	GF	GA	GD	Pts
A	Perlis	6	4	1	1	13	5	+8	13
B	Terengganu	6	4	0	2	14	5	+9	12
D	Kuala Muda Naza	6	4	0	2	13	8	+5	12
C	Perak	6	3	2	1	11	4	+7	11
E	Kedah	6	3	1	2	9	3	+6	10

== Knockout stage ==
=== Bracket ===
Quarterfinals
A1	KL Plus	1	0	1
E1	Kelantan	1	3	4
C1	Johor FC	1	0	1
A2	Perlis	2	2	4
B1	Negeri Sembilan	2	3	3
D2	Sabah FA	0	2	2
D1	Selangor	1	1	2 (4)
B2	Terengganu	1	1	2 (5)

Semifinals
Kelantan	2	3	5
Perlis	0	1	1
Negeri Sembilan	1	3	4
Terengganu	0	1	1

Final
Kelantan	1
Negeri Sembilan	3

=== Quarterfinals ===
==== First leg ====
2009-10-20
20:45

KL Plus	1 – 1	Kelantan
Fadzli Shaari 30'		Indra Putra 13'

KLFA Stadium, Cheras
Attendance: 15,000

2009-10-20
20:45

Negeri Sembilan	0 – 2	Sabah FA
		Aziz Sydykov 54', 65'

Tuanku Abdul Rahman Stadium, Paroi
Attendance: 10,000

2009-10-20
20:45

Johor FC	1 – 2	Perlis
Ezaidy Khadar 88'		K. Soley 40'; Ahmad Fakri 66'

Pasir Gudang Corporation Stadium, Pasir Gudang
Attendance: 10,000

2009-10-20
20:45

Selangor	1 – 1	Terengganu
Amri Yahyah 21'		Zairo Anuar 23'

Shah Alam Stadium, Selangor
Attendance: 30,000

==== Second leg ====
2009-10-24
20:45

Kelantan	3 – 0	KL Plus
Indra Putra 10' (pen.); Norfarhan 84' 86'

Sultan Mohammad IV Stadium, Kota Bharu
Attendance: 23,000

Kelantan won 4 – 1 on aggregate.

2009-10-24
20:45

Kuala Muda Naza	0 – 3	Negeri Sembilan
		Shukor Adan 21'; Zaquan Adha Radzak 28' (pen.); Shahurain Abu Samah 36'

Darul Aman Stadium, Alor Setar
Attendance: 5,000

Negeri Sembilan won 5 – 0 on aggregate.

2009-10-24
20:45

Perlis	2 – 0	Johor FC
Amar Rohidan 8'; Nizaruddin Yusof 48'

Utama Negeri Stadium, Kangar
Attendance: 5,000

Perlis won 4 – 1 on aggregate.

2009-10-24
20:45

Terengganu	1 – 1	Selangor
Manaf Mamat 12'		R. Surendren 64'
Penalties
	5 – 4

Sultan Ismail Nasiruddin Shah Stadium, Kuala Terengganu
Attendance: 15,000

Terengganu 2 – 2 Selangor on aggregate. Terengganu won 5-4 on penalties.

=== Semifinals ===
==== First leg ====
2009-10-27
20:45

Kelantan	2 – 0	Perlis
Indra Putra 22'; Rizal Fahmi Rosid 88'

Sultan Mohammad IV Stadium, Kota Bharu
Attendance: 25,000

2009-10-27
20:45

Negeri Sembilan	1 – 0	Terengganu
Khairul Amri 51'

Tuanku Abdul Rahman Stadium, Paroi
Attendance: 30,000

==== Second leg ====
2009-10-31
20:45

Perlis	1 – 3	Kelantan
Firdaus Fauzi 70'		Norfarhan Mohamad 26' 53' 87'

Utama Negeri Stadium, Kangar
Attendance: 20,000

Kelantan advances 5-1 on aggregate

2009-10-31
20:45

Terengganu	1 – 3	Negeri Sembilan
Khairul Izwan Khalid 35'		Zaquan Adha 9' 18'; Hairuddin Omar 45'

Sultan Ismail Nasiruddin Shah Stadium, Kuala Terengganu
Attendance: 15,000

Negeri Sembilan advances 4-1 on aggregate

== Final ==
7 November 2009
20:45

Kelantan	1 – 3	Negeri Sembilan
Indra Putra 90+'		Shahurain 18'; Hairuddin 46'; Zaquan Adha 60'

National Stadium, Bukit Jalil, Kuala Lumpur
Attendance: 95,000
Referee: Mohd Yusof Mat Karim (Tentera)

== Statistics ==
=== Top Scorer ===
Rank	Player	Club	Goals
1	Indra Putra Mahayuddin	Kelantan FA	10
1	Zaquan Adha	Negeri Sembilan	10
2	Fadzli Saari	(Kuala Lumpur) KL Plus	8
3	Nor Farhan Muhammad	Kelantan FA	7
4	Amri Yahyah	Selangor FA	6
4	Abdul Rahman Abdul Kadir	Pahang FA	6
5	Safee Sali	Selangor FA	5
5	Razali Umar Kandasamy	Perak	5
5	Nizaruddin Yusof	Perlis	5
5	Akmal Rizal Rakhli	(Kedah) KM Naza FC	5
