= 2009 Malaysia FA Cup =

Piala FA

Tournament details
- Country: Malaysia
- Teams: 28

Final positions
- Champions: Selangor FA (5th title)
- Runners-up: Kelantan FA

Tournament statistics
- Matches played: 34

The 2009 Malaysia FA Cup, also known as the 2009 TM Piala FA due to the competition's sponsorship by TM, was the 20th season of the Malaysia FA Cup.

Selangor has won the title for the fifth time, defeating Kelantan in the final.

== Format ==
The Piala FA competition has reverted to the old format of play with no more open draws. It will comprise 29 teams — 15 Super League and 14 Premier League sides — with defending champions Kedah FA, Selangor FA and Terengganu FA receiving byes in the first round.

Kedah FA, who won back-to-back trebles, will play the winner of the match between Proton FC and UPB-MyTeam FC in the second round.

== First round ==
The match first leg match for Harimau Muda and KL PLUS FC played on 24 January 2009. The second leg played on 4 February 2009. The first legs of other match played on 31 January 2009. The second legs played on 3 February 2009.

| Team 1 | Agg. | Team 2 | 1st leg | 2nd leg |
|---|---|---|---|---|
| Harimau Muda | 2-1 | KL PLUS | 2-0 | 0-1 |
| Proton FC | 1-5 | UPB-MyTeam | 1-2 | 0-3 |
| Kelantan FA | 4-3 | Johor FA | 4-0 | 0-3 |
| PDRM | 3-2 | Felda United | 1-2 | 2-0 |
| T-Team | (a) 2-2 | Shahzan Muda | 1-0 | 1-2 |
| Sarawak FA | 8-1 | ATM | 6-1 | 2-0 |
| Penang FA | 1-0 | Johor FC | 1-0 | 0-0 |
| Negeri Sembilan FA | 2-1 | Malacca FA | 0-0 | 2-1 |
| Pahang FA | 1-3 | PKNS | 1-1 | 0-2 |
| MBJB | 0-6 | Perlis FA | 0-4 | 0-2 |
| Perak FA | 11-1 | SDM Kepala Batas | 4-1 | 7-0 |
| Kuala Lumpur FA | 2-1 | Sabah FA | 1-1 | 1-0 |
| Kuala Muda Naza FC | Bye | | | |
| Kedah FA | Bye | | | |
| Selangor FA | Bye | | | |
| Terengganu FA | Bye | | | |

== Second round ==
The first leg match played on 21 February 2009. The second leg will be play on 24 February 2009.

| Team 1 | Agg. | Team 2 | 1st leg | 2nd leg |
|---|---|---|---|---|
| Kedah FA | 1-1(a) | UPB-MyTeam FC | 1-1 | 0-0 |
| Kelantan FA | 8-2 | PDRM FA | 5-1 | 3-1 |
| T-Team | 4-1 | Sarawak FA | 2-0 | 2-1 |
| Penang FA | 2-4 | Negeri Sembilan FA | 1-1 | 1-3 |
| Terengganu FA | 3-4 | Harimau Muda | 2-1 | 1-3 |
| PKNS | 1-2 | Perlis FA | 1-2 | 0-0 |
| Perak FA | 2-2 | Kuala Muda Naza | 1-1 | 1-1 |
| Kuala Lumpur FA | 1-2 | Selangor FA | 0-1 | 1-1 |

== Quarter-final ==
The quarter final matches are scheduled to be played on 3 March and the weekend of 7 March 2009.

=== First leg ===
3 March 2009
20:45

| UPB-MyTeam | 1 - 1 | Kelantan |
|---|---|---|
| Aslam 17' | | Indra Putra 10' |

MBPJ Stadium, Kelana Jaya

3 March 2009
20:45

| T-Team | 0 - 1 | Negeri Sembilan |
|---|---|---|
| | | S. Kunalan 77' |

Sultan Ismail Nasiruddin Shah Stadium, Kuala Terengganu

3 March 2009
20:45

| Harimau Muda | 0 - 1 | Perlis |
|---|---|---|
| | | Badrul Azam 70' |

National Stadium, Bukit Jalil

3 March 2009
20:45

| Perak | 1 - 2 | Selangor |
|---|---|---|
| Razali Umar 74' | | Safee 30' (pen.); Amri 53' |

Stadium Perak, Ipoh

=== Second leg ===
7 March 2009
20:45

| Kelantan | 3 - 1 | UPB-MyTeam |

Sultan Mohammad IV Stadium, Kota Bharu
- Kelantan advance 4-2 on aggregate

7 March 2009
20:45

| Negeri Sembilan | 0 - 0 | T-Team |

Tuanku Abdul Rahman Stadium, Paroi
- Negeri Sembilan advance 1-0 on aggregate

7 March 2009
20:45

| Perlis | 0 - 0 | Harimau Muda |

Utama Stadium, Kangar
- Perlis advance 1-0 on aggregate

7 March 2009
20:45

| Selangor | 2 - 0 | Perak |

Shah Alam Stadium, Shah Alam
- Selangor advance 4-1 on aggregate

== Semi-final ==
The first leg matches were played on Tuesday, 7 April 2009, while the second legs were played on Tuesday, 18 April 2009.

=== First leg ===
7 April 2009
20:45

| Kelantan FA | 0 - 1 | Negeri Sembilan FA |
|---|---|---|
| | | Zaquan |

Sultan Mohammad IV Stadium, Kota Bharu

7 April 2009
20:45

| Perlis FA | 1 - 1 | Selangor FA |
|---|---|---|
| Syazwan 2' | | Premnath 34' |

Utama Stadium, Kangar

=== Second leg ===
18 April 2009
20:45

| Negeri Sembilan FA | 1 - 2 | Kelantan FA |

Tuanku Abdul Rahman Stadium, Paroi
Attendance: 30,000
- Kelantan advance on the away goals rule

18 April 2009
20:45

| Selangor FA | 2 - 1 | Perlis FA |
|---|---|---|
| Amri 15' 90' | | Azi 17' |

Shah Alam Stadium, Shah Alam
Attendance: 35,000
- Selangor FA advance 3-2 on aggregate

== Final ==
The final was played at National Stadium, Bukit Jalil, Kuala Lumpur, on Saturday, 25 April 2009.

25 April 2009
20:45

| Kelantan FA | 1 - 1 (a.e.t.) | Selangor FA |
|---|---|---|
| Norfarhan 93' | Report | Amri 101' |
Penalties
| (penalty missed) Indra; (penalty scored) Ezrie; (penalty missed) Zairol | 1 – 4 | Khairul (penalty scored); Nasriq (penalty scored); Surendran (penalty scored); Safee (penalty scored) |

National Stadium, Bukit Jalil, Kuala Lumpur
Attendance: 92,000
Referee: (Malaysia) Munim Tajuddin
- Selangor FA win 4-1 on penalties

== Winners ==
Piala FA 2009 Winner

Selangor FA
5th Title

== Top scorers ==
Last updated 9 March 2009.

| Rank | Scorer | Team | Goals |
|---|---|---|---|
| 1 | Mohd Nizaruddin Yusof | Perlis | 5 |
| 1 | Razali Umar Kandasamy | Perak | 5 |
| 3 | **Muhamad Khalid Jamlus** | **Kelantan** | 4 |
| 3 | Khalid Hamlet | Sarawak | 4 |
| 3 | K. Thinagaran | Perak | 4 |
| 6 | **Indra Putra Mahayuddin** | **Kelantan** | 3 |
| 6 | **Mohd Nor Farhan Muhammad** | **Kelantan** | 3 |
| 6 | Azwan Malek | Kuala Lumpur | 3 |
| 6 | Ahmad Shakir Ali | Harimau Muda | 3 |
| 6 | Ahmad Aminuddin Shaharuddin | Harimau Muda | 3 |
| 6 | Joseph Kalang Tie | Sarawak | 3 |
| 6 | Mohd Nazrin Nawi | UPB-MyTeam | 3 |
| 13 | Badrul Azam Mohd Zamri | Perlis | 2 |
| 13 | Mohd Haris Safwan Mohd Kamal | T-Team | 2 |
| 13 | Hairuddin Omar | T-Team | 2 |
| 13 | Mohd Arsyah Ayob | Perak | 2 |
| 13 | Fatrurazi Rozi | PKNS | 2 |
| 13 | **Ramzul Zahini Adenan** | **Kelantan** | 2 |

Bold indicates players whose clubs are still active in the competition.
