= Che Hisamuddin Hassan =

Malaysian footballer

Che Hishamuddin
Personal information
- Full name: Che Hishamuddin Hassan
- Date of birth: 26 December 1975 (age 50)
- Place of birth: Kelantan, Malaysia
- Position: Forward

Senior career*
Years	Team	Apps	(Gls)
1997–2001	Kelantan JKR		(17)
2002–2003	Kedah FA		(0)
2004	Kelantan TNB		(6)
2005–2006	Negeri Sembilan FA		(5)
2006–2008	Terengganu FA		(10)
2009–2009	Kelantan FA	0	(0)
2010	Kelantan FA	4	(1)
2011	Betaria FC	0	(0)
2013	Tumpat FA	0	(0)
- * Club domestic league appearances and goals

Che Hishamuddin Hassan (born 26 December 1972) is a retired Malaysian football player.

Starting his career with Kelantan TNB, Kedah and Kelantan JKR, he later moved to Negeri Sembilan FA. He helped Negeri Sembilan to the 2006 Malaysia Cup final, where they were beaten by Perlis FA 2-1.

For the 2006-2007 season, he moved to Terengganu FA, where he played for two seasons. Hishamuddin returned to his home state and represent Kelantan FA in the 2009 season. With Kelantan, he played for two seasons, helping them to 2009 Malaysia Cup final where they were beaten by Hishamuddin's old team Negeri Sembilan 3-1. The next season, Kelantan finally won the 2010 Malaysia Cup, getting revenge against Negeri Sembilan 2-1 in the final, although Hishamuddin's appearances were infrequent in that season. His contract were not renewed after the season.

Hishamuddin played for Betaria FC in the 2011 Malaysia FAM League season. He retired after only one season with Betaria. However, in 2013, he joined Tumpat FA, a Kelantan-based club affiliated with Kelantan FA, for the 2013 Malaysia FAM League season.
