= Régis Laguesse =

French footballer (born 1950)

Personal information
- Date of birth: 6 January 1950 (age 76)
- Place of birth: Montreuil-Bellay, France
- Height: 1.72 m (5 ft 8 in)
- Position: Forward

Senior career*
Years	Team	Apps	(Gls)
1970–1971	Angers	2	(0)
1971–1972	Bastia	8	(2)
1972–1973	Laval	10	(1)

Managerial career
- 2007: BEC Tero Sasana
- 2008: Kelantan FA
- 2014: San Marino (assistant manager)
- * Club domestic league appearances and goals

Régis Laguesse (born 6 January 1950) is a French football coach and former player. He played as a forward for Angers, Bastia and Laval in the 1970s. He coached Thailand Premier League side BEC Tero Sasana in 2007, until he was replaced by fellow Frenchman Christophe Larrouilh. As of 2011 and 2014, Laguesse was working as a coach in Congo's Katumbi Académie, a football academy owned by TP Mazembe owner Moïse Katumbi Chapwe.
