= Mohd Zamri Ramli =

Malaysian footballer (born 1990)

Personal information
- Full name: Mohamad Zamri bin Ramli
- Date of birth: 23 November 1990 (age 35)
- Place of birth: Rantau Panjang, Kelantan, Malaysia
- Height: 1.68 m (5 ft 6 in)
- Position: Left back

Youth career
- 2007–2011: Kelantan President Cup Team

Senior career*
| Years | Team | Apps | (Gls) |
| 2009–2013 | Kelantan | 28 | (2) |
- * Club domestic league appearances and goals as of 21 May 2009 ‡ National team caps and goals as of 22 May 2009

Mohamad Zamri bin Ramli (born 23 November 1990) is a Malaysian footballer who formerly played for Kelantan FA as a left full back in the Malaysia Super League.

== Early life ==
Zamri was born in Kampung Puyu, which is a village in the district of Rantau Panjang, Kelantan. His family originated from Kampung Mundok, a Malay village, located in a town in southern Thailand, which was between Golok town. He has dual citizenship of Malaysia and Thailand. He received his early education in Sekolah Rendah Agama in Pasir Mas, Kelantan. Since that he always participate in Minor Championships Mundok District, Southern Thailand. After returning to Kelantan, he represented his school. His talent is detected, and called to play with Majlis Sukan Sekolah-Sekolah Agama Kelantan.

== Club career ==
=== Kelantan President Cup Team ===
In 2008, he was selected to represent the Kelantan President Cup Team. He won the hearts of selection panel headed by Shamsuddin and Che Awang Saupi. At the time, they are Kelantan President Cup Team coach. In 2009, he and his teammates won the Youth Cup. He was a key player in the team.

=== Kelantan ===
Following several seasons with the Kelantan President Cup Team, he was selected to train with the senior squad. His performance and work rate led to his promotion to the first team under head coach Peter James Butler, and he subsequently secured a place in the squad during the 2009 preseason preparations.

=== Suspended from playing ===
The Football Association of Malaysia punished Zamri Ramli with a two-year suspension after he was found guilty of taking the drug methamphetamine for the FA Cup final against Johor Darul Takzim in June 2013.

== Club statistics ==
=== Club ===
As of 21 April 2013.

| Club | Season | League | | | Charity Shield | | | FA Cup | | | Malaysia Cup | | | AFC Cup | | | AFC Champions League | | | Total | | |
| Club | Season | Apps | Goals | Assists | Apps | Goals | Assists | Apps | Goals | Assists | Apps | Goals | Assists | Apps | Goals | Assists | Apps | Goals | Assists | Apps | Goals | Assists |
|---|---|---|---|---|---|---|---|---|---|---|---|---|---|---|---|---|---|---|---|---|---|---|
| Kelantan | 2009 | | | | | | | | | | | | | | | | | | | | | |
| Kelantan | 2010 | | | | | | | | | | | | | | | | | | | | | |
| Kelantan | 2011 | | | | | | | | | | | | | | | | | | | | | |
| Kelantan | 2012 | | | | | | | | | | | | | 4 | 1 | - | | | | | | |
| Kelantan | 2013 | 11 | 1 | - | 0 | 0 | - | 1 | 0 | - | 0 | 0 | - | 2 | 0 | - | - | - | - | 14 | 1 | - |
| Kelantan | Total | 11 | 1 | - | 0 | 0 | - | 1 | 0 | - | 0 | 0 | - | 6 | 1 | - | - | - | - | 18 | 2 | |
| Career total | | | | | | | | | | | | | | | | | | | | | | |
