= Rosairil Asrul Mat Nor =

Malaysian footballer

Rosairil Asrul
Personal information
- Full name: Rosairil Asrul Mat Nor
- Date of birth: 14 September 1977 (age 49)
- Place of birth: Kelantan, Malaysia
- Height: 1.66 m (5 ft 5 1/2 in)
- Positions: Defender; midfielder

Senior career*
Years	Team	Apps	(Gls)
1998–2000	Kelantan FA		(0)
2001–2002	Kelantan JKR		(4)
2003	Kelantan SKMK		(2)
2004	Kelantan TNB		(0)
2005–2008	Terengganu FA		(2)
2009–2010	Kelantan FA		
- * Club domestic league appearances and goals

Rosairil Asrul Mat Nor (born 14 September 1977) is a Malaysian football player who recently played for Kelantan FA in Malaysia Super League. Prior to Terengganu, he played with Terengganu FA and three Kelantan club team from 2001 until 2004.
