= Zul Yusri Che Harun =

Malaysian footballer

Personal information
- Full name: Zul Yusri bin Che Harun
- Date of birth: 24 June 1986 (age 40)
- Place of birth: Pasir Mas, Kelantan, Malaysia
- Height: 1.68 m (5 ft 6 in)
- Position: Right winger

Youth career
- 2005–2006: Kelantan FA President's Cup Team

Senior career*
| Years | Team | Apps | (Gls) |
| 2007–2011 | Kelantan FA | 5 | (0) |
- * Club domestic league appearances and goals as of 10 December 2011 ‡ National team caps and goals as of 10 December 2011

Zul Yusri Che Harun (born 24 June 1986 in Pasir Mas, Kelantan) is a Malaysian footballer who plays as a midfielder formerly playing for Kelantan FA in Malaysia Super League.
