= Akmal Rizal =

Malaysian footballer (born 1981)

Personal information
- Full name: Akmal Rizal Bin Ahmad Rakhli
- Date of birth: 12 December 1981 (age 44)
- Place of birth: Jitra, Kedah, Malaysia
- Height: 1.70 m (5 ft 7 in)
- Position: Forward

Team information
- Current team: Kedah FA (head coach)

Youth career
- 1998: Kedah FA
- 1999: RC Strasbourg

Senior career*
Years	Team	Apps	(Gls)
1999	Kedah FA		
1999–2001	RC Strasbourg	0	(0)
1999–2001	→ FCSR Haguenau (loan)	36	(10)
2002–2006	Kedah FA	53	(38)
2006–2008	Selangor FA	39	(23)
2009	Kuala Muda Naza	16	(3)
2010	Kelantan FA	18	(10)
2011–2012	Perak FA	45	(14)
2013	Kedah FA	16	(3)
2014	Sarawak FA	5	(1)
2015	Kedah United		
Total		242	(107)

International career^{‡}
1998–2004	Malaysia U23	24	(20)
2001–2008	Malaysia	22	(9)

Managerial career
- 2019: PB Melayu Kedah
- 2020–2021: Penang (assistant)
- 2022–2023: Penang U21
- 2023–2024: Penang
- 2025: MPKP Kubang Pasu
- 2025–2026: Kelantan The Real Warriors
- 2026–: Kedah FA
Medal record
Men's football
Representing Malaysia
Malaysia U23
SEA Games
Bronze medal – third place	2003 Vietnam	Football
Silver medal – second place	2001 Malaysia	Football
- * Club domestic league appearances and goals as of 6 January 2022 ‡ National team caps and goals as of 6 December 2013

Akmal Rizal Bin Ahmad Rakhli (born 12 December 1981) is a former Malaysian professional footballer who played as a forward. He is one of the batch of Malaysians to play overseas. He is currently the head coach of the Malaysia A1 Semi-Pro League club Kedah FA.

== Club career ==
=== Early career ===
A product of the Kedah youth academy (Kedah Piala President), Akmal made his way abroad to RC Strasbourg. He made his debut for the RC Strasbourg Academy which ended in a 3–1 win against FC Köln II, scoring 2 goals. In 2000, to aid his development, the then 19-year-old forward joined FCSR Haguenau on loan. He scored 11 goals in 22 games and won Championnat de France Amateur 2. On 20 May 2000, during RC Strasbourg's tour to Malaysia, Akmal and Peguy Luyindula helped them beat GNK Dinamo Zagreb 2–0 in friendly match at the Shah Alam Stadium. He attracted the attention of former Mainz coach Jürgen Klopp.

=== Kedah FA ===
In 2002, he returned from abroad and played for his former youth club. In the 2003 Liga Perdana 1, he scored 10 goals in 24 games and become runner-up with the club.

=== Selangor FA ===
He then played for Selangor for the 2006–07 Malaysia Super League.

=== Kuala Muda Naza ===
In the 2009 Malaysia Super League, he joined the new promoted Kuala Muda Naza.

=== Kelantan FA ===
On 12 January 2010, he scored his first goal for Kelantan FA in a 3–0 win against Johor FA. Later, he finally won his first Malaysia Cup in the 2010 Malaysia Cup Final after Kelantan beat Negeri Sembilan FA 2–1.

=== Perak FA ===
After leaving Kelantan FA, he joined Perak FA and reunited with former national team coach Norizan Bakar.

=== Kedah FA ===
He made his second debut on 7 January 2013, appearing as a substitute in a 1–0 win against UiTM F.C.. On 8 March 2013, he scored his first season goal, against Kuala Lumpur FA. He made 16 appearances with Kedah FA before he agreed to join Sarawak FA for the 2014 Malaysia Super League season.

=== Sarawak FA ===
On 10 November 2013, Akmal Rizal officially signed a one-year contract with Sarawak FA after being released by Kedah FA.

=== Kedah United ===
In 2015, Akmal Rizal played with Kedah United in the FAM League.

== International career ==
He represented Malaysia U23 for the 2001 SEA Games in Kuala Lumpur. He also represented Malaysia U23 for the Afro-Asian Games Hyderabad, India in October 2003. In 2002, Akmal was called up for an international friendly match against Brazil. He has also been called up by the Malaysia national team coach Norizan Bakar for the 2007 AFC Asian Cup.

== International goals ==
#	Date	Venue	Opponent	Score	Result	Competition
1.	8 March 2001	Hong Kong, Hong Kong	Hong Kong	2–0	Won	2002 FIFA World Cup qualification (AFC)
2.	8 March 2001	Hong Kong, Hong Kong	Hong Kong	2–0	Won	2002 FIFA World Cup qualification (AFC)
3.	25 March 2001	Doha, Qatar	Palestine	4–3	Won	2002 FIFA World Cup qualification (AFC)
4.	25 March 2001	Doha, Qatar	Palestine	4–3	Won	2002 FIFA World Cup qualification (AFC)
5.	11 December 2002	Kuala Lumpur, Malaysia	Cambodia	5–0	Won	Friendly
6.	18 December 2002	Singapore, Singapore	Singapore	0–4	Won	2002 Tiger Cup Group Stage
7.	20 December 2002	Singapore, Singapore	Thailand	3–1	Won	2002 Tiger Cup Group Stage
8.	12 July 2004	Kuala Lumpur, Malaysia	Singapore	2–0	Won	Friendly
9.	21 June 2007	Petaling Jaya, Malaysia	United Arab Emirates	1–3	Loss	Friendly

== After retirement ==
Akmal Rizal retired from playing professionally in 2016. He was the co-commentator for Media Prima Berhad. He also opened a youth football academy in hometown Jitra, while completing the coaching course.

== Managerial career ==
On 27 December 2019, Akmal was hired to become assistant coach for Penang FC. In 2022, he became head coach for Penang U-21. On 7 November 2023, he became Penang caretaker for remaining of the 2023 Malaysia Super League season. He were appointed as the permanent head coach of Penang for the 2024-25 season.

== Managerial statistics ==
As of 8 June 2026

Managerial record by team and tenure
Team	Nat.	From	To	Record					Ref.
Team	Nat.	From	To	G	W	D	L	Win %	Ref.
Penang	(Malaysia)	7 November 2023	1 November 2024	19	3	8	8	15.79	
Kelantan TRW	(Malaysia)	16 October 2025	11 March 2026	19	4	1	14	21.05	
Kedah FA	(Malaysia)	8 June 2026	Present	0	0	0	0	—	
Career Total				38	7	9	22	18.42	

== Honours ==
=== Club ===
FCSR Haguenau

- Championnat de France amateur 2 : 2000

Kedah FA

- Liga Perdana 2 : 2002
- Liga Perdana 1 : runner-up 2003
- Malaysia Premier League : 2005-06

Selangor FA

- Malaysia Cup : 2008 runner-up
- Malaysia FA Cup : 2008 runner-up

Kelantan FA

- Malaysia Cup : 2010
- Malaysia Super League : runner-up 2010

=== International ===
Malaysia U-23

- SEA Games : (silver) silver 2001; (bronze) bronze 2003

Malaysia U-14

- Nike Cup Asia Pacific : 1994-95

=== Individual ===
- SEA Games Top Scorer : 2001

=== Coaching ===
Penang U-21

- Sukma Games : (silver) silver 2022
