= Shahurain Abu Samah =

Malaysian footballer

Personal information
- Full name: Shahurain bin Abu Samah
- Date of birth: 23 December 1986 (age 39)
- Place of birth: Kajang, Selangor, Malaysia
- Height: 1.74 m (5 ft 8 1/2 in)
- Positions: Midfielder; right wing; forward

Youth career
- 2003–2006: Selangor President's Team

Senior career*
Years	Team	Apps	(Gls)
2006–2013	Negeri Sembilan		
2014	Felda United	13	(0)
2014	PKNS	18	(0)
2015	PDRM	8	(1)
2016–2017	PKNS		
2017	→ PDRM (loan)	17	(4)
2018–2020	PDRM	32	(6)
2020	Negeri Sembilan	3	(0)

International career^{‡}
2006–2010	Malaysia U-23	12	(0)
2011–2012	Malaysia	5	(0)
- * Club domestic league appearances and goals as of July 13, 2018 ‡ National team caps and goals as of January 02, 2016

Shahurain bin Abu Samah (born 23 December 1986 in Kajang, Selangor) is a Malaysian footballer who plays as a midfielder. Shahurain began his early career with Selangor President's Cup Team. He was part of the Negeri Sembilan squad that won the 2009 Malaysia Cup by scoring the first goal in a 3–1 win against Kelantan in the final. He also played for Malaysian national team.

== Club career ==
=== PKNS ===
In April 2014, Shahurain joined PKNS.
