= Mohd Badhri Mohd Radzi =

Malaysian footballer

Badhri Radzi
Personal information
- Full name: Mohd Badhri bin Mohd Radzi
- Date of birth: 2 June 1982 (age 44)
- Place of birth: Kota Bharu, Kelantan, Malaysia
- Height: 1.75 m (5 ft 9 in)
- Positions: Central midfielder; attacking midfielder

Team information
- Current team: AZM Rovers F.C.

Youth career
- 2001–2003: Kelantan U21

Senior career*
Years	Team	Apps	(Gls)
2004	Kelantan JPS	24	(2)
2005	Kelantan TNB	24	(2)
2006	Kelantan	21	(4)
2006–2007	PDRM	20	(2)
2008–2018	Kelantan	221	(54)
2019	Perlis	6	(0)
2019–2020	Kelantan United	43	(1)
2025–	AZM Rovers	5	(0)

International career^{‡}
2011–2012	Malaysia XI	5	(0)
2013–2014	Malaysia	9	(0)
Medal record
Men's football
Representing Malaysia
Malaysia
AFF Championship
Runner-up	AFF Suzuki Cup 2014	2014
- * Club domestic league appearances and goals as of 24 January 2026 ‡ National team caps and goals as of January 27, 2016

Mohd Badhri bin Mohd Radzi, P.S. (born 2 June 1982) is a Malaysian professional footballer who plays for Malaysian team AZM Rovers F.C. Well known as Piya, Badhri is usually deployed as a central midfielder, but can also play as attacking midfielder. He also is the former captain of Kelantan. Badhri is Kelantan's most successful captain, having led them won several domestic trophies.

== Early life ==
Badhri was born and raised in Pengkalan Chepa near Kota Bharu in the state of Kelantan. He began actively playing football since the age of 10 playing for his school, Sekolah Kebangsaan Padang Garong in Kota Bharu. On the following year, he went to Sekolah Menengah Kebangsaan Putera in Kota Bharu. His father is former Kelantan TNB player during the semi-pro era.

== Club career ==
=== Kelantan JPS ===
Badhri made his senior debut with Kelantan-based club Kelantan JPS. He played for the club during 2002 season. 2003, he played for Kelantan in the President Cup.

=== Kelantan TNB ===
Badhri made his debut with Kelantan TNB in the 2004 Malaysia Premier League. He scored 2 goals along that season.

=== PDRM FA ===
In 2007, Badhri moved to the Malaysia Premier League team PDRM FA, helping to win the 2006–07 Malaysia Premier League. PDRM FA was promoted to the Malaysia Super League the following year.

=== Kelantan ===
==== 2007–2008 season ====
In 2008, at the age of 26, Badhri returned to his hometown and played for Kelantan FA. During that time he played under Norizan Bakar and Khairul Anuar Ramli, as the captain of the team. They obtained third place during that season and Badhri scored 9 goals.

==== 2009 season ====
In 2009, when first appointed as team captain, he refused due to other senior players. He was part of the team that lost to Selangor in the 2009 Malaysia FA Cup final. Later in the season, he broke his leg during the match against Penang, consequently missing the Malaysia Cup final.

==== 2010 season ====
Badhri scored a winning goal in the 2010 Malaysia Cup final match and brought the cup for the first time in 89 years, after defeating defending champions Negri Sembilan. He was selected as the 100 plus most exciting player in the final game. During 2010 season, he scored 12 goals in 38 appearances.

==== 2011 season ====
Badhri became the pillar of the team when Kelantan gained 1st place in the 2011 Malaysia Super League season. Therefore, Kelantan had qualified to compete in the 2012 AFC Cup for the first time. He scored 16 goals in 40 appearances along the season.

==== 2012 season ====
Badhri has put his name on the scoreboard during his team biggest win of the season. Kelantan needed a simple win to clinch the crown but, they went on a rampage thrashing Perak 6–0. In final season match, he scored against Sarawak. Kelantan fans streamed to witness the historical moment of Badhri lifting up the much coveted Super League trophy. He was a captain again when Kelantan created history by lifting the FA Cup for the first time after a 22-years, beating Sime Darby 1–0 in the final. Badhri made his debut in the AFC Cup against Navibank Saigon on 7 March 2012. Badhri has contributed to Kelantan's second goal against Arema with his corner from the left and glancing header by Mohammad Ghaddar. During the quarter-final first leg, Badhri drew level from the spot kick in the 42nd minute. The match ended with Arbil SC winning 5–1. During the second leg of the Malaysia Cup semi-final against Selangor, Badhri scored second goal with a sublime free kick during injury-time. Badhri has helped his team win the 2012 Malaysia Cup when he assisted all three goals against ATM.

==== 2013 season ====
Badhri scored the first goal during Kelantan's opening 2013 Malaysia Super League match, a 2–1 victory over PKNS. During the 2013 AFC Cup, Badhri scored a splendid goal straight from a corner kick. During the 2013 Malaysia FA Cup Final, Badhri made an assist and was selected as the man of the match in the final.

==== 2018 season ====
On 15 November 2017, Badhri has extended his contract with Kelantan for another year. However, he was excluded along with several other senior players under the new coach Fajr Ibrahim in 2018.

== International career ==
In July 2011, Badhri was called up to represent Malaysia Selection against Chelsea. Malaysia Selection lost that match 1–0, with goal scored by Didier Drogba. In March 2013, Badhri got selected into the Malaysia national team. He made his debut against Saudi Arabia in a friendly match on 17 March.

== Career statistic ==
=== Club ===
As of 17 March 2018

Appearances and goals by club, season and competition
Club	Season	League			Other^{1}		Cup		League Cup		Continental^{2}		Total	
Club	Season	Division	Apps	Goals	Apps	Goals	Apps	Goals	Apps	Goals	Apps	Goals	Apps	Goals
Kelantan TNB	2004	Malaysia Premier League		2	—						—		??	2
Kelantan TNB	Total			2	—						—			2
Kelantan	2005	Malaysia FAM League			—		6	2			—		6	2
Kelantan	Total				—		6	2			—		6	2
Kelantan	2005–06	Malaysia Premier League	21	4	—						—		21	4
Kelantan	Total		21	4	—						—		21	4
PDRM FA	2006–07	Malaysia Premier League	20	2	—						—		20	2
PDRM FA	Total		20	2	—						—		20	2
Kelantan	2007–08	Malaysia Premier League	24	9	—		2	0			—		26	9
Kelantan	2009	Malaysia Super League	26	6	—		8	1	11	0	—		45	7
Kelantan	2010	Malaysia Super League	26	6	—		2	0	11	4	—		39	10
Kelantan	2011	Malaysia Super League	24	10	1	1	7	3	8	4	—		40	18
Kelantan	2012	Malaysia Super League	22	8	1	0	6	2	10	3	7	1	46	14
Kelantan	2013	Malaysia Super League	22	6	1	0	6	1	11	5	5	4	45	16
Kelantan	2014	Malaysia Super League	19	3	—		5	1	8	2	6	2	38	8
Kelantan	2015	Malaysia Super League	21	3	—		6	1	5	1	—		32	5
Kelantan	2016	Malaysia Super League	19	2	—		2	0	5	2	—		26	4
Kelantan	2017	Malaysia Super League	16	1	—		0	0	2	0	—		18	1
Kelantan	2018	Malaysia Super League	2	0	—		2	0	0	0	—		4	0
Kelantan	Total		221	54	3	1	46	9	71	21	18	7	359	94
Perlis	2019	Malaysia Premier League	1	0	—		0	0	0	0	—		1	0
Perlis	Total		1	0	—		0	0	0	0	—		1	0
Kelantan	2019	Malaysia Premier League	0	0	—		0	0	0	0	—		0	0
Kelantan	Total		0	0	—		0	0	0	0	—		0	0
Career total			263	63	3	1	52	11	71	21	18	7	407	104

^{1} Includes Malaysia Charity Shield
^{2} Includes AFC Cup / AFC Champions League

== International ==
International appearances and goals
#	Date	Venue	Opponent	Result	Goal	Competition
1.	22 March 2013	Shah Alam Stadium	Yemen	2–1 (W)	0	2015 AFC Asian Cup qualification
2.	1 March 2014	Selayang	Philippines	0–0 (D)	0	Friendly
3.	27 April 2014	Cebu	Philippines	0–0 (D)	0	Friendly
4.	8 August 2014	Dushanbe	Tajikistan	4–1 (L)	0	Friendly
5.	20 October 2014	Shah Alam	Cambodia	4–1 (W)	0	Friendly
6.	12 November 2014	Shah Alam	Syria	0–3 (L)	0	Friendly
7.	11 December 2014	Mỹ Đình National Stadium	Vietnam	2–4 (W)	0	2014 AFF Suzuki Cup
8.	17 December 2014	Rajamangala Stadium	Thailand	0–2 (L)	0	2014 AFF Suzuki Cup
9.	20 December 2014	Bukit Jalil Stadium	Thailand	3–2 (W)	0	2014 AFF Suzuki Cup

== Honours ==
=== Club ===
Kelantan FA

- Malaysia Super League: 2011, 2012
- Malaysia FAM Cup: 2005
- Malaysia FA Cup: 2012, 2013 Runner-up 2009, 2011, 2015
- Malaysia Cup: 2010, 2012 Runner-up 2009
- Malaysia Charity Shield: 2011 runner-up 2012, 2013

PDRM FA

- Malaysia Premier League: 2006–07

Kelantan United

- Malaysia M3 League: 2019

AZM Rovers

- Malaysia A2 Amateur League: 2025–26

=== International ===
Malaysia

- AFF Championship: 2014 runner-up

Sporting positions
Preceded by Indra Putra	Captain of Kelantan FA; 2008–2018	Succeeded by Shahrizan Ismail
