= Wan Zaman =

Malaysian footballer

Personal information
- Birth name: Wan Zaman bin Wan Mustapha
- Date of birth: 12 June 1983 (age 43)
- Place of birth: Kelantan, Malaysia
- Height: 1.72 m (5 ft 7 1/2 in)
- Position: Midfielder

Team information
- Current team: AZM Rovers F.C. (assistant)

Youth career
- 2002–2003: Kelantan President's Cup Team

Senior career*
Years	Team	Apps	(Gls)
2004–2011	Kelantan		
2012–2015	PDRM		
2016	MOF F.C.		
- * Club domestic league appearances and goals ‡ National team caps and goals as of December 31, 2015

Wan Zaman bin Wan Mustapha (born 12 June 1983 in Kota Bharu, Kelantan) is a Malaysian former professional footballer who played as a midfielder.
