= 2010 Malaysia Super League =

Liga Super
- Season: 2010
- Champions: Selangor; 2nd title
- Relegated: Johor; Penang
- Matches: 182
- Goals: 476 (2.62 per match)
- Top goalscorer: Mohd Ashaari Shamsuddin (18 goals)
- Biggest home win: Selangor 6–0 Johor (26 January 2010)
- Biggest away win: Penang 1–6 T–Team (5 July 2010)
- Highest scoring: Terengganu 6–3 Johor (21 April 2010)

The 2010 Liga Super, also known as the TM Liga Super for sponsorship reasons, was the seventh season of the Liga Super, the top-tier professional football league in Malaysia.

The season was held from 9 January and concluded on 3 August 2010.

The Liga Super champions for 2010 was Selangor.

The opening match of the season between Negeri Sembilan and Selangor also doubled as the Piala Sumbangsih fixtures where it was won by Selangor by a score of 2–1.

== Team changes ==
The following teams have changed division.

=== To Malaysia Super League ===
Promoted from Premier League

- T-Team
- Johor
- Kuala Lumpur

=== From Malaysia Super League ===
Relegated to Premier League

- PDRM

Withrawal

- Kuala Muda Naza
- UPB-MyTeam

== Teams ==
A total of 14 teams compete in the 2010 season which includes the top 11 teams that participated in the 2009 season and champions and runners-up of the 2009 Liga Premier.

The three teams were promoted to complete a total 10 teams including 2009 Liga Premier runners-up T–Team, third-placed Johor and fourth-placed Kuala Lumpur which secured direct promotion to the Liga Super.

- Selangor (2009 Liga Super winner)
- Perlis
- Kedah
- Johor FC
- Terengganu
- Kelantan
- Negeri Sembilan
- (Kuala Lumpur) PLUS
- Perak
- Penang
- Pahang
- (Terengganu) T–Team (Note: Promoted as runners-up from 2009 Liga Premier)
- Johor (Note: Promoted as third place from 2009 Liga Premier)
- Kuala Lumpur (Note: Promoted as fourth place from 2009 Liga Premier)

=== Stadiums and locations ===
Locations of teams in the 2010 Liga Super

Team	Location	Stadium	Capacity
Johor	Larkin	Tan Sri Dato Hj Hassan Yunos Stadium	30,000
Johor FC	Pasir Gudang	Pasir Gudang Corporation Stadium	15,000
Kedah	Alor Setar	Darul Aman Stadium	32,387
Kelantan	Kota Bharu	Sultan Mohammad IV Stadium	20,000
Kuala Lumpur	Kuala Lumpur	KLFA Stadium	18,000
Negeri Sembilan	Paroi	Tuanku Abdul Rahman Stadium	30,000
Pahang	Kuantan	Darulmakmur Stadium	40,000,
T–Team	Kuala Terengganu	Sultan Ismail Nasiruddin Shah Stadium	25,000
Penang	Batu Kawan	Negeri Pulau Pinang Stadium	40,000
Perak	Ipoh	Perak Stadium	35,000
Perlis	Kangar	Utama Stadium	20,000
PLUS	Kelana Jaya	MBPJ Stadium	25,000
Selangor	Shah Alam	Shah Alam Stadium	69,372
Terengganu	Kuala Terengganu	Sultan Ismail Nasiruddin Shah Stadium	25,000

== League table ==
Pos	Team	Pld	W	D	L	GF	GA	GD	Pts	Qualification or relegation
1	Selangor	26	20	3	3	62	23	+39	63	
2	Kelantan	26	17	8	1	50	14	+36	59	
3	Terengganu	26	15	5	6	51	27	+24	50	
4	Johor FC	26	13	4	9	44	29	+15	43	
5	Kedah	26	10	8	8	34	23	+11	38	
6	Negeri Sembilan	26	11	5	10	40	31	+9	38	
7	T–Team	26	10	8	8	33	26	+7	38	
8	Pahang	26	10	3	13	31	50	−19	33	
9	Kuala Lumpur	26	8	8	10	20	29	−9	32	
10	PLUS	26	8	6	12	29	29	0	30	Withdrawal from Liga Super (Note: PLUS withdrew from Liga Super before the start of 2011 season.)
11	Perak	26	8	6	12	25	30	−5	30	
12	Perlis	26	8	5	13	32	35	−3	29	
13	Johor	26	5	1	20	18	66	−48	16	Relegation to 2011 Liga Premier
14	Penang	26	2	4	20	10	67	−57	10	Relegation to 2011 Liga Premier

Source: Results TM Liga Super
Rules for classification: 1) points; 2) goal difference; 3) number of goals scored.

== Results ==
Home \ Away	JFC	JOH	KED	KEL	KUL	NSE	PLU	T-T	PAH	PEN	PRK	PRL	SEL	TER
Johor FC		3–0	1–2	1–3	0–1	1–1	1–0	2–2	2–1	5–0	1–0	2–1	1–3	2–0
Johor	0–5		0–3	1–4	0–1	0–2	1–0	0–3	2–0	1–0	0–2	3–2	1–2	3–6
Kedah	0–1	1–0		0–0	0–0	0–1	2–3	3–1	3–0	0–0	1–1	0–1	2–0	4–0
Kelantan	4–1	3–0	0–1		3–0	1–0	4–1	0–0	2–1	3–1	2–0	2–1	0–0	3–0
Kuala Lumpur	0–0	2–1	0–2	0–2		0–0	0–2	1–1	1–1	2–0	2–1	1–1	2–4	1–1
Negeri Sembilan	2–1	3–1	2–1	1–3	1–2		2–1	0–1	5–0	4–0	0–0	3–2	1–2	2–1
PLUS	1–1	4–0	1–1	0–3	0–0	1–1		1–0	1–2	3–1	1–1	1–2	0–1	0–1
T–Team	1–0	5–0	2–2	0–1	1–0	2–1	0–0		1–1	1–0	1–1	1–0	1–2	1–1
Pahang	3–0	0–1	2–1	3–3	1–0	2–1	2–1	2–1		2–0	2–1	3–2	2–3	0–5
Penang	0–5	1–1	0–3	1–3	1–0	0–3	0–4	1–6	2–1		1–1	0–0	0–1	1–5
Perak	0–3	2–0	1–0	0–0	0–1	2–1	0–1	3–0	2–0	4–0		0–1	1–0	1–3
Perlis	0–1	4–2	1–1	0–0	0–2	2–0	0–1	0–1	4–0	2–0	3–0		1–1	2–4
Selangor	4–1	6–0	4–0	1–1	4–1	4–2	2–1	3–0	4–0	3–0	4–1	2–0		2–0
Terengganu	4–0	2–0	1–1	0–0	2–0	1–1	1–0	1–0	2–0	4–0	2–0	4–0	4–0	

Updated to match(es) played on 3 August 2010. Source: Results TM Liga Super
Legend: Blue = home team win; Yellow = draw; Red = away team win.

== Season statistics ==
=== Top scorers ===
Including matches played on n/a; Source: FIFA: Liga Super Scorers

Rank	Scorer	Club	Goals
1	Mohd Ashaari Shamsuddin	Terengganu	18
2	Mohd Safee Mohd Sali	Selangor	12
3	Mohd Amirul Hadi Zainal	Selangor	12
4	Norshahrul Idlan Talaha	Kelantan	11
5	Azlan Ismail	Kedah	10
6	Mohd Azamuddin Md Akil	Pahang	10
7	Abdul Manaf Mamat	Terengganu	9
8	R. Surendran	Selangor	8
9	Badhri Radzi	Kelantan	8
10	Mohd Nurul Azwan Roya	Johor FC	7

== See also ==
- List of Liga Super seasons
