= Khairan Eroza Razali =

Malaysian footballer

Personal information
- Full name: Khairan Eroza bin Razali
- Date of birth: 5 May 1979 (age 47)
- Place of birth: Kota Bharu, Kelantan, Malaysia
- Height: 1.76 m (5 ft 9 1/2 in)
- Positions: Winger; midfielder

Team information
- Current team: Penang FA

Youth career
- 1998–2001: Kelantan President's Cup

Senior career*
Years	Team	Apps	(Gls)
2002–2011	Kelantan FA	65	(5)
2012	Pahang FA	10	(1)
2013–	Penang FA	26	(3)
- * Club domestic league appearances and goals as of 9 December 2013

Khairan Eroza Razali (born 5 May 1979) is a Malaysian footballer playing for Penang FA. He plays as a defensive midfielder. His previous clubs were Kelantan and Pahang.
