= Nor Farhan Muhammad =

Malaysian footballer

Personal information
- Full name: Mohd Nor Farhan Bin Muhammad
- Date of birth: 19 December 1984 (age 41)
- Place of birth: Wakaf Tapai, Terengganu Malaysia
- Height: 1.73 m (5 ft 8 in)
- Positions: Midfielder; striker; winger

Youth career
- 2001–2004: Terengganu President Cup Team

Senior career*
Years	Team	Apps	(Gls)
2005–2007	Terengganu	21	(8)
2007–2009	PDRM	24	(9)
2009–2010	Kelantan	52	(12)
2010–2011	T-Team	22	(5)
2011–2013	Kelantan	43	(20)
2013–2014	Terengganu	22	(5)
2015–2018	Kelantan	37	(6)
2018	→ D'AR Wanderers (loan)	5	(5)
2019–2020	PDRM FC	5	(0)

International career^{‡}
2006–2007	Malaysia U-23		
2006–2015	Malaysia	12	(0)
Medal record
Men's football
Representing Malaysia
Malaysia U23
Merdeka Tournament
Winner	2007
SEA Games
Bronze medal – third place	2005 Manila	Football
- * Club domestic league appearances and goals ‡ National team caps and goals as of June 7, 2016

Mohd Nor Farhan Bin Muhammad, P.B. (born 19 December 1984) is a Malaysian professional footballer who plays as forward or attacking midfielder.

Farhan's international senior debut was against Singapore on 31 May 2006. He also played in 2006 Asian Games in Doha, representing Malaysia U-23 team.

== Club career ==
=== Terengganu ===
Farhan made his senior debut with Terengganu during 2005–06.

=== PDRM ===
After two successful seasons with Terengganu, Farhan moved to PDRM. He scored two goals in big win over Kuala Lumpur in the Malaysia Cup.

=== Kelantan ===
==== 2012 season ====
After a season playing for T-Team, Farhan returned to Kelantan in 2012 season.

In the first round of the FA Cup, against Sarawak Farhan scored the winning goal. Farhan's brace in the 3–0 win over KL SPA in the first leg of the FA Cup quarter-final has sealed Kelantan's place in the last four. Farhan credited his strike partner Onyekachi Nwoha for his goal rush during that match.

On 23 May, Farhan scored twice as Kelantan defeated Terengganu 3–2 in 2012 AFC Cup knockout stage. Unfortunately, Arbil won 6–2 on aggregate. On 15 October, Farhan scored winning goal during the first leg of Malaysia Cup semi-finals against Selangor.

=== Return to Terengganu ===
Farhan rejoined Terengganu despite Kelantan offering higher salary for the player. Farhan again make a return to Kelantan in 2015. After being frozen out of the Kelantan first team, Farhan signed with Malaysia FAM League team D'AR Wanderers on loan from April 2018.

== International career ==
Farhan was selected to represent Malaysia for 2007 AFC Asian Cup. He made two appearances as substitute. Farhan also helped Malaysia to win 2007 Merdeka Tournament. He was a member of the Malaysia team in the 2008 AFF Suzuki Cup.

== Career statistics ==
=== Club ===
As of 13 May 2018

Appearances and goals by club, season and competition
Club	Season	League			Cup		League Cup		Continental		Total	
Club	Season	Division	Apps	Goals	Apps	Goals	Apps	Goals	Apps	Goals	Apps	Goals
Terengganu	2005–06	Malaysia Premier League	??	??	6	2	8	6	—		14	8
Terengganu	2006–07	Malaysia Premier League	21	8	??	??	??	??	—		21	8
Terengganu	Total		21	8	6	2	8	6	—		35	16
PDRM	2007–08	Malaysia Premier League	24	9	??	0	??	6	—		30	15
PDRM	Total		24	9	??	0	??	6	—		30	15
Kelantan	2009	Malaysia Super League	26	7	8	0	11	0	—		45	7
Kelantan	2010	Malaysia Super League	26	5	??	0	??	1	—		??	6
Kelantan	Total		52	12	8	0	11	1	—		71	13
T-Team	2011	Malaysia Super League	22	5	1	0	8	4	—		31	9
T-Team	Total		22	5	1	0	8	4	—		31	9
Kelantan	2012	Malaysia Super League	24	6	6	5	10	5	7	2	47	18
Kelantan	2013	Malaysia Super League	19	6	6	2	11	3	7	0	43	11
Kelantan	Total		43	12	12	7	21	8	14	2	90	29
Terengganu	2014	Malaysia Super League	22	5	1	0	8	4	—		31	9
Terengganu	Total		22	5	1	0	8	4	—		31	9
Kelantan	2015	Malaysia Super League	17	6	6	0	3	0	—		26	6
Kelantan	2016	Malaysia Super League	1	0	0	0	0	0	—		1	0
Kelantan	2017	Malaysia Super League	14	0	1	0	6	0	—		21	0
Kelantan	2018	Malaysia Super League	5	0	2	0	0	0	—		7	0
Kelantan	Total		37	6	9	0	9	0			55	6
D'AR Wanderers	2018	Malaysia FAM League	5	5	0	0	0	0	—		5	0
D'AR Wanderers	Total		5	0	0	0	0	0			5	0
Career total			226	62	37	9	65	29	14	2	342	102

=== International ===
As of 28 August 2017

Appearances and goals by national team and year
National team	Year	Apps	Goals
Malaysia	2006	4	0
Malaysia	2007	5	0
Malaysia	2013	1	0
Malaysia	2014	1	0
Malaysia	2015	1	0
Total		12	0

== Honours ==
=== Club ===
==== Kelantan ====
- Malaysia Super League: 2012; Runner-up 2010
- Malaysia Cup: 2010, 2012; Runner-up 2009, 2013
- Malaysia FA Cup: 2012, 2013; Runner-up 2009, 2015
- Malaysia Charity Shield: Runner-up 2012

=== International ===
Malaysia

- SEA Games: (bronze) Bronze 2005
- Pestabola Merdeka: 2007

=== Individual ===
FAM Football Awards

- Best Young Player: 2005/06
- Best Striker : 2013 , 2014
