= Sultan Muhammad IV Stadium =

Football stadium in Kota Bharu, Malaysia

Sultan Muhammad IV Stadium Stadium Sultan Muhammad IV
- Interactive map of Sultan Muhammad IV Stadium; Stadium Sultan Muhammad IV
- Location: Jalan Mahmood, Kota Bharu, Kelantan, Malaysia
- Coordinates: 6°7′26″N 102°14′36″E
- Operator: Perbadanan Stadium Kelantan
- Capacity: 15,178
- Surface: Grass
- Scoreboard: Yes
- Field size: 119 by 100 metres (130.1 yd × 109.4 yd)
- Public transit: Route D32 Kota Bharu ⇌ Rantau Panjang

Construction
- Built: 1965
- Opened: 1967
- Renovated: 2010; 2016; 2024
- Cost: RM 1,500,000

Tenants
- Football Association of Kelantan (1967–present); Kelantan (1967–2024); Kelantan The Real Warriors (2016–2026); Kelantan Red Warrior (2025–present); Kelantan City (2025–present)

The Sultan Muhammad IV Stadium (Malay: Stadium Sultan Muhammad IV) is a stadium in the state of Kelantan, Malaysia. It is located on Jalan Mahmood, Kota Bharu, and best known as the home of football venue. The stadium can accommodate up to 15,178 spectators. It is the fourth largest stadium in the East Coast of Peninsular Malaysia, behind Sultan Mizan Zainal Abidin Stadium, Darul Makmur Stadium and Tun Abdul Razak Stadium.

== History ==
Sultan Muhammad IV Stadium is one of the oldest stadiums in Malaysia, built in an area of 13 acres at a cost of RM 1.5 million. It was named after the late Sultan Muhammad IV of Kelantan. It was built in 1965 on the site of Kelantan Football Association.

== Facilities ==
Apart from football facilities, the stadium complex also has athletic tracks, business facilities, restaurants and exhibition sites. It also provides recreational facilities and a Surau. The stadium is situated near Raja Perempuan Zainab II Hospital, Kelantan Police Headquarters and the Kota Bharu Municipal council.

== Electronic scoreboard ==
An Electronic LED Scoreboard system was installed at the stadium in late 2012. It was first deployed during the 2012 AFC Cup between Kelantan and Erbil SC. The size of the LED scoreboard is 6×11 meters. It is considered the best electronic scoreboard in the country in terms of resolution, equipped with multi-camera video production.

== International matches ==
=== 2011 ===
18 June Friendly	Malaysia	2 – 0	Myanmar	Kota Bharu, Kelantan
	Amirul 28'; Baddrol 54'	Report

=== 2012 ===
4 April AFC Cup	Kelantan (Malaysia)	3 – 0	(Indonesia) Arema	Kota Bharu, Kelantan
20:45 UTC+8	Ghaddar 22', 47', 89'	Report		Attendance: 9,245; Referee: Kim Sang-Woo (South Korea)

8 May AFC Cup	Kelantan (Malaysia)	1 – 0	(Myanmar) Ayeyawady United	Kota Bharu, Kelantan
20:45 UTC+8	Nwoha 47'	Report		Attendance: 7,372; Referee: Tayeb Shamsuzzaman (Bangladesh)

23 May AFC Cup	Kelantan (Malaysia)	3 – 2	(Malaysia) Terengganu	Kota Bharu, Kelantan
20:45 UTC+8	Nor Farhan 4', 17'; Fahmi 45+2'	Report	Faruqi 56'; Doe 85' (pen.)	Attendance: 18,652; Referee: Yousef Al-Marzouq (Kuwait)

25 September AFC Cup	Kelantan (Malaysia)	1 – 1	(Iraq) Erbil SC	Kota Bharu, Kelantan
20:45 UTC+8	Ghaddar 90+2' (pen.)	Report	Sula 37'	Attendance: 5,024; Referee: Choi Myung-Yong (South Korea)

=== 2013 ===
6 March AFC Cup	Kelantan (Malaysia)	1 – 1	(Maldives) Maziya	Kota Bharu, Kelantan
20:45 UTC+8	Badhri 77'	Report	Adhuham 62'	Attendance: 12,000; Referee: Yu Ming-hsun (Chinese Taipei)

2 April AFC Cup	Kelantan (Malaysia)	5 – 0	(Vietnam) SHB Đà Nẵng	Kota Bharu, Kelantan
20:45 UTC+8	Nwakaeme 4'; Indra Putra 7'; Faiz 23'; Petratos 59'; Badhri 85'	Report		Attendance: 10,000; Referee: Jumpei Iida (Japan)

30 April AFC Cup	Kelantan (Malaysia)	3 – 1	(Myanmar) Ayeyawady United	Kota Bharu, Kelantan
20:00 UTC+8	Petratos 42'; Shahrul 70'; Badhri 83'	Report	Nay Lin Tun 80'	Attendance: 14,200; Referee: Chris Beath (Australia)

14 May AFC Cup	Kelantan (Malaysia)	0 – 2	(Hong Kong) Kitchee	Kota Bharu, Kelantan
20:45 UTC+8		Report	Kcira 15' (o.g.); Jordi 45+1'	Attendance: 15,000; Referee: Lee Min-Hu (South Korea)

=== 2014 ===
12 March AFC Cup	Kelantan (Malaysia)	2 – 0	(Hong Kong) South China	Kota Bharu, Kelantan
20:45 UTC+8	Zaharulnizam 72'; Ghaddar 84'	Report		Attendance: 4,564; Referee: Dmitriy Mashentsev (Kyrgyzstan)

18 March AFC Cup	Kelantan (Malaysia)	2 – 3	(Vietnam) Vissai Ninh Bình	Kota Bharu, Kelantan
20:45 UTC+8	Nazri 37'; Khairul Izuan 45+2'	Report	Bryan 24'; Tambwe 50'; Voinea 62'	Attendance: 1,500; Referee: Tayeb Shamsuzzaman (Bangladesh)

8 April AFC Cup	Kelantan (Malaysia)	2 – 3	(Vietnam) Vissai Ninh Bình	Kota Bharu, Kelantan
20:45 UTC+8	Khairul Izuan 50'; Zaharulnizam 55'	Report	César 25'; Emerson 64'; Kyaw Ko Ko 80'	Attendance: 1,505; Referee: Yu Ming-hsun (Chinese Taipei)

== See also ==
- Sport in Malaysia
- List of stadiums in Malaysia
