= Hairuddin Omar =

Malaysian footballer (born 1979)

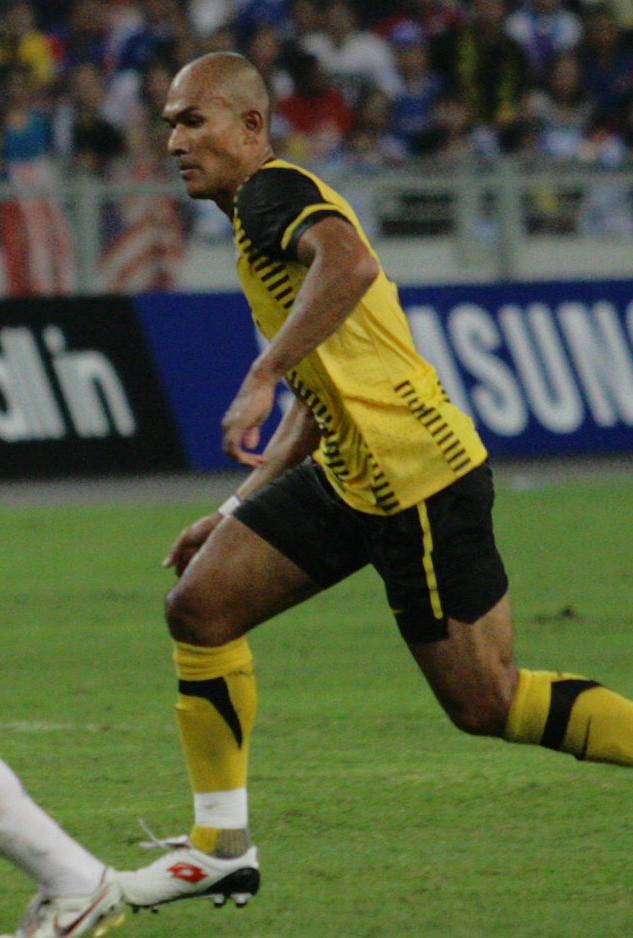
- Hairuddin playing for Malaysia Selection against Chelsea in 2011

Personal information
- Full name: Hairuddin Bin Omar
- Date of birth: 29 September 1979 (age 47)
- Place of birth: Setiu, Terengganu, Malaysia
- Height: 1.77 m (5 ft 9 1/2 in)
- Positions: Forward; midfielder

Team information
- Current team: Terengganu FC II ( Head Coach)

Youth career
- 1997–1998: Terengganu

Senior career*
Years	Team	Apps	(Gls)
1999–2002	Terengganu		
2003–2008	Pahang		
2008–2009	T-Team FC		
2009	→ Negeri Sembilan (loan)		
2010	Kelantan	26	(1)
2011	Negeri Sembilan	26	(1)
2012–2015	ATM		
2016	Terengganu		

International career^{‡}
2000–2009	Malaysia	55	(13)

Managerial career
- 2017–2018: Malaysia U-19 (assistant coach)
- 2022: Terengganu FC (assistant coach)
- 2023–2025: Terengganu F.C. II
- 2025–: Malaysia U-23 (assistant coach)
Medal record
Malaysia under-23
Sea Games
Silver medal – second place	Sea Games 2001	Football
- * Club domestic league appearances and goals as of 15 August 2014 ‡ National team caps and goals as of 15 August 2014

Hairuddin Bin Omar (born 29 September 1979) also known as Hai-O is a Malaysian football coach and former player, he is the assistant coach of Malaysia U-23.

His career as a coach began when he became the assistant coach of the Malaysia U-19 under Bojan Hodak. He has successfully helped Bojan lead the Malaysia U-19 to become the runner-up of the AFF U-19 Championship 2017 and the champion the following year. In 2022, he was appointed as an assistant coach of Terengganu FC under the management of Nafuzi Zain, and he also managed to help Terengganu become runner-up in the 2022 Malaysia FA Cup and second in the league. In the following year, he was appointed head coach of Terengganu II F.C., who are currently playing in the MFL Cup.

== Club career ==
Born and raised in Setiu, 70 kilometres from Kuala Terengganu, Hairuddin began his football career with Terengganu and made his professional season debut playing for Terengganu in 1999. He helped his team win the Malaysia Cup in 2001. After 4 seasons playing for his hometown team, he signed a contract with Pahang in 2003.

Hairuddin was part of the Pahang team that won the 2004 Malaysia Super League title and later clinched the Malaysia FA Cup title in 2006. After 6 years of spending his career with Pahang, Hairuddin returned to his hometown and signed a contract with a Kuala Terengganu-based football club, T-Team. During the Malaysia Cup campaign in 2009, he was loaned to Negeri Sembilan until the end of the Malaysia Cup campaign. On 7 November 2009, Negeri Sembilan secured the 2009 Malaysia Cup title in a 1–3 win over Kelantan and scored 1 goal in that match.

In 2010, Hairuddin signed a one-year contract with Kelantan. While playing for the team, he won the 2010 Malaysia Cup and scored 1 goal in a 2–1 win in the final against Negeri Sembilan on 30 October 2010 at the Bukit Jalil National Stadium.

After his contract with Kelantan ended, Hairuddin signed a one-year contract with Negeri Sembilan in 2011. He made 19 appearances and 4 goals in the league campaign. During the 2011 Malaysia Cup, Hairuddin scored 8 goals to claim the tournament's golden boot, including the winning goal in a 2–1 win over Terengganu in the final. That was Hairuddin's third straight Malaysia Cup title since 2009.

In 2012, Hairuddin signed a contract with Malaysian Armed Forces for the 2012 Malaysia Premier League season and was appointed as the captain of the team. Hairuddin spent 4 years with the club before leaving for Terengganu in 2016. While playing for Armed Forces, Hairuddin led the team into winning the 2012 Malaysia Premier League title, 2012 Malaysia Cup title and won the Sultan Haji Ahmad Shah Cup in 2013.

Hairuddin returned to Terengganu in 2016 after he refused to extend his contract with Armed Forces for another year. He signed a one-year contract with the team.

In February 2017, Hairuddin announced his retirement at club and international level.

On 4 January 2020, Hairuddin came out from his retirement to play for a social football club, U.C Viching. He provided an assist despite losing 3–1 in that match.

Since 2013, Hairuddin is also the president of the Professional Footballers Association of Malaysia.

== International career ==
Hairuddin earned 54 caps, scoring 13 goals for the Malaysia national team from 2000 to 2009. He represented Malaysia at 3 AFF Championship in 2002, 2007 and 2008, 2007 Asian Cup and also 2001 Southeast Asian Games and 2002 Asian Games for the national under 23 team.

On 25 July 2003, Hairuddin earned the distinction of scoring Malaysia's solitary goal in the 4–1 defeat to Chelsea in FA Premier League Asia Cup 2003, an invitational tournament in 2003. Then he out-jumped England international John Terry to nod the ball home off a swerving corner kick from his Terengganu teammate, Rosdi Talib, four minutes after Frank Lampard had opened the scoring in the 36th minute. It was as a result of a well-worked set-piece the boys managed to translate into the game, giving the nation the first goal against an English opponent since Matlan Marjan's double against England at Merdeka Stadium in 1991.

== Managerial career ==
In August 2017, Hairuddin was appointed as the Malaysia national under-19 team assistant head coach working along with Bojan Hodak.

== Career statistics ==
=== International ===
Appearances and goals by national team and year
National team	Year	Apps	Goals
Malaysia	2000	7	2
Malaysia	2001	9	3
Malaysia	2002	4	1
Malaysia	2003	7	2
Malaysia	2004	5	0
Malaysia	2005	2	0
Malaysia	2007	10	3
Malaysia	2008	10	2
Malaysia	2009	1	0
Total		55	13

Scores and results list Malaysia's goal tally first, score column indicates score after each Omar goal.

List of international goals scored by Hairuddin Omar
No.	Date	Venue	Opponent	Score	Result	Competition
1	7 November 2000	Tinsulanon Stadium, Songkhla, Thailand	Laos	3–0	5–0	2000 AFF Championship
2	9 November 2000	Tinsulanon Stadium, Songkhla, Thailand	Cambodia	2–0	3–2	2000 AFF Championship
3	23 March 2001	Jassim bin Hamad Stadium, Doha, Qatar	Hong Kong	1–2	1–2	2002 FIFA World Cup qualification
4	25 March 2001	Grand Hamad Stadium, Doha, Qatar	Palestine	2–2	4–3	2002 FIFA World Cup qualification
5	25 March 2001	Grand Hamad Stadium, Doha, Qatar	Palestine	4–2	4–3	2002 FIFA World Cup qualification
6	11 December 2002	Petaling Jaya Stadium, Petaling Jaya, Malaysia	Cambodia	?–0	5–0	Friendly
7	20 October 2003	Bahrain National Stadium, Riffa, Bahrain	Iraq	1–3	1–5	2004 AFC Asian Cup qualification
8	24 October 2003	Bahrain National Stadium, Riffa, Bahrain	Myanmar	1–2	1–2	2004 AFC Asian Cup qualification
9	12 January 2007	Suphachalasai Stadium, Bangkok, Thailand	Philippines	1–0	4–0	2007 AFF Championship
10	12 January 2007	Suphachalasai Stadium, Bangkok, Thailand	Philippines	4–0	4–0	2007 AFF Championship
11	18 June 2007	Shah Alam Stadium, Shah Alam, Malaysia	Cambodia	3–0	6–0	Friendly
12	10 October 2008	Bukit Jalil National Stadium, Kuala Lumpur, Malaysia	Pakistan	3–0	4–1	Friendly
13	20 October 2008	Bukit Jalil National Stadium, Kuala Lumpur, Malaysia	Afghanistan	6–0	6–0	2008 Pestabola Merdeka

== Honours ==
=== Club ===
Terengganu

- Malaysia Cup: 2001

Pahang

- Malaysia Super League: 2004
- Malaysia FA Cup: 2006

Negeri Sembilan

- Malaysia Cup: 2009, 2011

Kelantan

- Malaysia Cup: 2010

Angkatan Tentera Malaysia

- Malaysia Premier League: 2012

=== International ===
Malaysia U-23

- SEA Games: (silver) Silver 2001

Malaysia

- AFF Championship: 2000 third place
- Pestabola Merdeka: 2008 runner up

=== Head coach ===
Terengganu II

- MFL Cup: 2023
