= Tuanku Syed Putra Stadium =

Stadium in Perlis, Malaysia

Coordinates: 6°27′02″N 100°12′02″E

- TSP
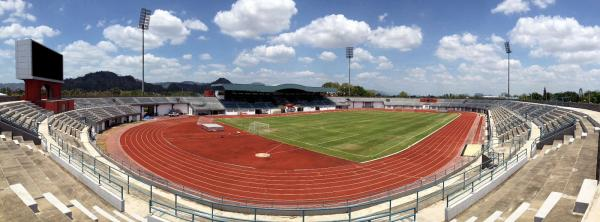
- Interactive map of Tuanku Syed Putra Stadium
- Former names: State Main Stadium
- Location: Kangar, Perlis, Malaysia
- Capacity: 20,000
- Surface: Grass
- Scoreboard: Yes

Construction
- Opened: 1995

Tenants
- Perlis FA; Perlis United; Singa Muda Perlis; Perlis GSA; Kuala Perlis Titans; Star City

Tuanku Syed Putra Stadium is a multi-purpose stadium in Kangar, Perlis, Malaysia. It is used mostly for football matches. The stadium opened in 1995, and has the capacity of 20,000. The stadium was built for the purposes of the 1997 FIFA World Youth Championship.

== International fixtures ==
=== 1997 FIFA World Youth Championship ===
| Date | Team | Score | Team | Round |
|---|---|---|---|---|
| 18 June 1997 | Hungary | 0–3 | Argentina | Group stage |
| 18 June 1997 | Australia | 0–0 | Canada | Group stage |
| 20 June 1997 | Hungary | 0–1 | Australia | Group stage |
| 20 June 1997 | Argentina | 2–1 | Canada | Group stage |
| 23 June 1997 | Hungary | 1–2 | Canada | Group stage |
| 23 June 1997 | Argentina | 3–4 | Australia | Group stage |
| 26 June 1997 | Australia | 0–1 | Japan | Round of 16 |

== See also ==
- Sport in Malaysia
- List of football stadiums in Malaysia
- Lists of stadiums
