= PLUS F.C. =

Malaysian football club

- Full name: PLUS Football Club
- Nickname: The Highway Warriors
- Founded: 2000; 25 years ago
- Ground: Persada PLUS Mini Stadium, Kelana Jaya, Petaling Jaya, Selangor
- Capacity: 2,000
- League: KLFA Super League
- 2019: KLFA Super League 8th of 10

PLUS Football Club (Malay: Kelab Bola Sepak Projek Lebuhraya Usaha Sama Malaysia Berhad) was a football club of PLUS Expressways Berhad, the main toll highway operator company of the Malaysian Expressway System. The club last played in the Kuala Lumpur League. Their home stadium was the MBPJ Stadium, Kelana Jaya, Petaling Jaya, Selangor. It started in amateur KLFA Division 2 in 2000. After 2 years it was promoted to the KLFA Division 1, and became the KLFA Cup champion in 2004. It was promoted to the Malaysia Premier League in 2007, and to the Super League Malaysia 2009 in 2009. The club finished at a commendable 7th place in its first season, and reached the quarter-finals of the 2009 Malaysia Cup.

PLUS FC withdrew in 2011 following a corporate exercise of PLUS Expressways. They were replaced by Harimau Muda A for the spot at the 2011 Super League Malaysia. PLUS FC briefly came back in the Kuala Lumpur League Division 1 in 2013.

== Honours ==
| Title | Winners | Runners-up |
|---|---|---|
| Division 2/Premier 2/Premier League | | 2008 |

=== Achievements (2006–2010) ===
| Year | Position | League | FA Cup | Malaysia Cup |
|---|---|---|---|---|
| 2006 | Semi Finalist | Malaysia FAM Cup | Not Qualify | Not Qualify |
| 2007 | 11/11 | Malaysia Premier League | 2nd Round | Not Qualify |
| 2008 | Runner Up | Malaysia Premier League | 2nd Round | Not Qualify |
| 2009 | 7/14 | Malaysia Super League | 1st Round | Quarter Final |
| 2010 | 10/14 | Malaysia Super League | Quarter Final | Round 1 |

== Former players ==
Local

- (Malaysia) Bobby Gonzales
- (Malaysia) Irwan Fadzli Idrus
- (Malaysia) Fadzli Saari
- (Malaysia) Nazrulerwan Makmor
- (Malaysia) Raimi Mohd Nor
- (Malaysia) Safiq Rahim
- (Malaysia) Norhafiz Zamani Misbah
- (Malaysia) Ramesh Lai
- (Malaysia) Mohd Rozul Harris Mohd Nasir
- (Malaysia) Razi Effendi Suhit
- (Malaysia) Nizaruddin Yusof
- (Malaysia) Shahazriz Redwan
- (Malaysia) Reeshafiq Alwi

Foreign

- (Nigeria) Alex Agbo
- (Argentina) Adrian Trinidad
- (Brazil) Tércio Nunes Machado

== Coaching history ==
| Year | Head coach |
|---|---|
| 2006–2007 | (Malaysia) Ramli Mahmud |
| 2007 | (Malaysia) Fisol Abdul Razak |
| 2008–2010 | (Malaysia) Mat Zan Mat Aris |
