= 2012 Liga Super goalscorers =

This is the list of 2012 Malaysia Super League goalscorers.

== Goals ==
15 goals

- (Cameroon) Jean-Emmanuel Effa Owona (Negeri Sembilan FA)
- (Liberia) Francis Doe Forkey (Terengganu FA)

13 goals

- (Slovakia) Michal Kubala (Perak FA)

12 goals

- (Croatia) Boško Balaban (Selangor FA)

10 goals

- Shahril Ishak (Singapore LIONSXII)
- (Malaysia) Ahmad Shakir Mohd Ali (Negeri Sembilan FA)
- (Malaysia) Mohd Khyril Muhymeen Zambri (Kedah FA)

9 goals

- (Lebanon) Mohammed Ghaddar (Kelantan FA)
- (Malaysia) Mohd Faiz Subri (PBDKT T-Team FC)
- (Malaysia) Zairo Anuar Zalani (PBDKT T-Team FC)

8 goals

- Shahdan Sulaiman (Singapore LIONSXII)
- (Malaysia) Mohd Badri Mohd Radzi (Kelantan FA)

7 goals

- Arthuro Henrique Bernhardt (Johor FC)
- Indra Putra Mahayuddin (Kelantan FA)
- Michaël Niçoise (PKNS FC)
- Mohd Fadzli Saari (PBDKT T-Team FC)
- Mohd Ashaari Shamsuddin (Terengganu FA)
- Albert Ebossé Bodjongo (Perak FA)

6 goals

- Mohd Norfarhan Mohamad (Kelantan FA)
- Mohd Fauzan Dzulkifli (PKNS FC)
- Sharudin Yakup (Sabah FA)
- Norshahrul Idlan Talaha (Kelantan FA)
- Mohd Amri Yahyah (Selangor FA)
- Vedran Gerc (Kedah FA)
- Rozaimi Abdul Rahman (Sabah FA)

5 goals

- Agu Casmir (Singapore LIONSXII)
- Farderin Kadir (Felda United FC)
- Mickaël Antoine-Curier (Felda United FC)
- Sufian Anuar (Singapore LIONSXII)
- Mohd Safiq Rahim (Selangor FA)
- Akmal Rizal Ahmad Rakhli (Perak FA)
- Hariss Harun (Singapore LIONSXII)
- Mohd Helmi Remeli (PKNS FC)

4 goals

- Abdul Manaf Mamat (Terengganu FA)
- Muhammad Shukor Adan (Negeri Sembilan FA)
- Mohd Haris Safwan Mohd Kamal (Johor FC)
- Zakaria Charara (Kuala Lumpur FA)
- Joseph Kalang Tie (Terengganu FA)
- Rudie Ramli (PKNS FC)
- Ashri Chuchu (Sarawak FA)
- Mohd Riduwan M'aon (Johor FC)
- Azidan Sarudin (Selangor FA)
- Zainizam Marjan (Sabah FA)
- Michael Baird (Sabah FA)
- Afiq Azmi (Kuala Lumpur FA)
- Mohd Firdaus Azizul (Negeri Sembilan FA)

3 goals

- Mohd Nizad Ayub (Felda United FC)
- Suppiah Chanturu (Kelantan FA)
- Muhd Rafiuddin Rodin (Perak FA)
- Ramez Dayoub (Selangor FA)
- Mohd Khairul Ismail (Johor FC)
- Yong Kuong Yong (Felda United FC)
- Mohd Raimi Mohd Nor (Felda United FC)
- Vedran Muratović (Sarawak FA)
- Ismail Faruqi Asha'ri (Terengganu FA)
- Joël Epalle (Sarawak FA)
- Safuwan Baharudin (Singapore LIONSXII)
- Mohamad Fazli Baharudin (PKNS FC)
- Khairul Izwan Khalid (PBDKT T-Team FC)
- Shahurain Abu Samah (Negeri Sembilan FA)
- Abdul Hadi Yahya (Terengganu FA)
- Guy Bwele (Sarawak FA)
- Baddrol Bakhtiar (Kedah FA)

2 goals

- Fahrul Razi Kamaruddin (Perak FA)
- K. Ravindran (Sarawak FA)
- Denny Antwi (Kelantan FA)
- Shaiful Esah (Singapore LIONSXII)
- Azi Shahril Azmi (Johor FC)
- Mohd Nizaruddin Yusof (PKNS FC)
- Ahmad Fakri Saarani (Felda United FC)
- Mohd Rizal Fahmi Abdul Rosid (Kelantan FA)
- Mohd Azrif Nasrulhaq Badrul (PKNS FC)
- Azrul Hazran Amiludin Baki (PBDKT T-Team FC)
- Shahrizal Saad (Johor FC)
- Muhammad Shafiq Jamal (Perak FA)
- Bobby Gonzales (Sabah FA)
- Mohd Fazrul Hazli Mohd Kadri (Perak FA)
- Mohd Shahrol Saperi (Sarawak FA)
- Mohd Azrul Ahmad (Felda United FC)
- Onyekachi Nwoha (Kelantan FA)
- Irwan Shah (Singapore LIONSXII)
- P. Gunalan (Selangor FA)
- Hamidan Mohammed (Kedah FA)
- Mohd Syazwan Zainon (Johor FC)
- Emmanuel Okine (Kuala Lumpur FA)
- Solehin Kanasian Abdullah (Selangor FA)
- Fernando de Abreu Ferreira (Johor FC)
- Mohd Hairol Mokhtar (Sarawak FA)
- Baihakki Khaizan (Singapore LIONSXII)
- Khairul Nizam (Singapore LIONSXII)
- Mohd Amirul Hadi Zainal (Selangor FA)
- Khairul Azahar Eidros (Sarawak FA)
- Zamri Morshidi (Sarawak FA)
- Azizan Saperi (Sarawak FA)
- Mohd Faizal Abu Bakar (Kedah FA)
- Mohd Muslim Ahmad (Terengganu FA)
- S. Kunanlan (Negeri Sembilan FA)
- Mohd Nurul Azwan Roya (Kelantan FA)
- Brendan Gan (Sabah FA)
- Hendrik Helmke (Sabah FA)

1 goals

- Lazar Popović (Perak FA)
- Mohd Nazri Mohd Kamal (Perak FA)
- Muhamad Kaironnisam Sahabudin Hussain (Johor FC)
- S. Subramaniam (Kelantan FA)
- Sevki Sha'ban (Singapore LIONSXII)
- Rosdi Talib (PBDKT T-Team FC)
- Marco Tulio (PBDKT T-Team FC)
- Yosri Derma Raju (Sarawak FA)
- Muhd Khairu Azrin Khazali (PKNS FC)
- Mohd Norhakim Hassan (PKNS FC)
- Famirul Asraf Sayuti (Selangor FA)
- Ronny Harun (Sabah FA)
- Amar Rohidan (Kedah FA)
- Muhammad Fiqry Mat Isa (Kedah FA)
- Mohd Izuan Jarudin (Johor FC)
- Abdul Shukur Jusoh (Terengganu FA)
- Nordin Alias (Terengganu FA)
- Muhd Shahrom Abdul Kalam (Perak FA)
- Mohd Failee Mohamad Ghazli (Perak FA)
- Azlan Ismail (Kelantan FA)
- Obinna Nwaneri (Kelantan FA)
- G. Mahathevan (Negeri Sembilan FA)
- Mohd Alif Shamsudin (Negeri Sembilan FA)
- Bojan Petrić (PBDKT T-Team FC)
- Norfazly Alias (PBDKT T-Team FC)
- Kalle Sone (Sarawak FA)
- Paulo Sérgio Ferreira Gomes (PKNS FC)
- K. Gurusamy (Selangor FA)
- Abdulfatah Safi (Kedah FA)
- Stanley Bernard Stephen Samuel (Kuala Lumpur FA)
- Khairul Anuar Shafie (Kuala Lumpur FA)
- Fazuan Abdullah (Kuala Lumpur FA)
- Pritam Singh Charun Singh (Kuala Lumpur FA)
- Radzi Mohd Hussin (Sabah FA)
- Jasazrin Jamaluddin (Johor FC)
- Zairul Fitree Ishak (Kelantan FA)
- Mohd Daudsu Jamaluddin (Kelantan FA)
- Marian Farbák (Negeri Sembilan FA)
- Zachariah Simukonda (PBDKT T-Team FC)
- Mohd Norhafizzuan Jailani (PKNS FC)
- Mohd Azizan Baba (Sarawak FA)
- Mohd Firdaus Faudzi (Felda United FC)
- Helmi Loussaief (PKNS FC)
- R. Surendran (Selangor FA)
- Mohd Fitri Shazwan Raduwan (Selangor FA)
- Mohd Fadhil Mohd Hashim (PKNS FC)
- Erison da Silva Santos (Terengganu FA)
- Juffrey Omopor (Sabah FA)
- Razid Gafar (Sabah FA)
- Leopold Alphonso (Sabah FA)

== Own goal ==
1 goal

- Aiman Syazwan Abdullah (Kuala Lumpur FA) (for Singapore LIONSXII)
- Mohd Helmi Remeli (PKNS FC) (for Sabah FA)
- Khairan Ezuan Razali (Felda United FC) (for Perak FA)
- Mohd Sabre Mat Abu (Kedah FA) (for Sabah FA)
- Mohd Syazwan Mohd Roslan (Perak FA) (for Kedah FA)
- Mohd Fadzli Saari (T-Team FC) (for PKNS FC)
- Mafry Balang (Sabah FA) (for Perak FA)
- S. Kunanlan (Negeri Sembilan FA) (for Terengganu FA)
- Shahrul Azhar Ture (Sabah FA) (for Singapore LIONSXII)
- Mohd Fazliata Taib (Kedah FA) (for Kelantan FA)
- Ahmad Jihad Ismail (Kuala Lumpur FA) (for Sabah FA)
- Mohd Reithaudin Awang Emran (Sabah FA) (for Terengganu FA)
- Bojan Petrić (PBDKT T-Team FC) (for Singapore LIONSXII)
