= 2012 Malaysia Super League =

Liga Super
- Season: 2012
- Champions: Kelantan; 2nd title
- Relegated: Sarawak; Kedah; Sabah; Kuala Lumpur
- AFC Cup: Kelantan; Selangor
- Matches: 182
- Goals: 489 (2.69 per match)
- Top goalscorer: 15 goals Jean-Emmanuel Effa Owona (Negeri Sembilan); Francis Doe Forkey (Terengganu)
- Biggest home win: LionsXII 9–0 Sabah (16 June 2012)
- Biggest away win: Kuala Lumpur 0–4 Felda United (13 April 2012); Sabah 0–4 PKNS (19 June 2012) Kuala Lumpur 2 – 4 Sabah (30 June 2012)
- Highest scoring: LionsXII 9–0 Sabah (16 June 2012); Terengganu 6–3 Sabah (17 March 2012)
- Longest winning run: 4 matches LionsXII; T-Team; Kelantan; Perak; Selangor
- Longest unbeaten run: 15 matches Kelantan
- Longest losing run: 10 matches Kuala Lumpur

The 2012 Liga Super, also known as the Astro Liga Super for sponsorship reasons, was the ninth season of the Liga Super, the top-tier professional football league in Malaysia.

The season was held from 10 January and concluded on 14 July 2012.

The Liga Super champions for 2012 was Kelantan.

== Team changes ==
The following teams have changed division.

=== To Malaysia Super League ===
Promoted from Premier League

- PKNS
- Sarawak

invited team

- LionsXII

=== From Malaysia Super League ===
Relegated to Premier League

- Pahang
- Perlis

Exchanged with Lions XII to S. League

- Harimau Muda A

== Teams ==
A total of fourteen teams will contest the league, including eleven sides from the 2011 season and two promoted teams from the 2011 Liga Premier. Singapore Lions of Singapore will also participate in the 2012 season, replacing Harimau Muda A.

Perlis and Pahang were relegated at the end of the 2011 Liga Super after finishing the season in the bottom two places of the league table.

2011 Liga Premier champions PKNS and runners-up Sarawak secured direct promotion to the Liga Super.

Following an agreement between the Football Association of Singapore and the Football Association of Malaysia, Young Lions, with most of the members of the squad are players from Singapore's national under-23 team, will replace Harimau Muda A, which represent the Malaysian Under-23 national football team. While the Singapore Lions will compete at the Liga Super, Harimau Muda A will take the Young Lions position in the S. League. Young Lions was later replaced by a new team, named LionsXII that will replace the former under-23 football team.

- Felda United
- Johor FC
- Kedah
- Kelantan (2011 Liga Super champions)
- Kuala Lumpur
- Negeri Sembilan
- Perak
- PKNS¹
- Sabah
- Sarawak¹
- Selangor
- LionsXII*
- T-Team
- Terengganu
- – LionsXII (Originally to participate was Young Lions of Singapore and will replace Harimau Muda A as Harimau Muda A will replace Young Lions in the S. League.)

¹ – promoted from Liga Premier

== Team summaries ==
=== Stadium ===
Locations of teams in the 2012 Liga Super

Team	Location	Stadium	Capacity
Felda United	Kuala Lumpur	Hang Jebat Stadium	35,000
Johor FC	Pasir Gudang	Pasir Gudang Corporation Stadium	15,000
Kedah	Alor Setar	Darul Aman Stadium	32,387
Kelantan	Kota Bharu	Sultan Mohammad IV Stadium	25,000
Kuala Lumpur	Kuala Lumpur	Hang Jebat Stadium	35,000
Negeri Sembilan	Paroi	Tuanku Abdul Rahman Stadium	40,000
T-Team	Kuala Terengganu	Sultan Ismail Nasiruddin Shah Stadium	15,000
Perak	Ipoh	Perak Stadium	42,500
PKNS	Petaling Jaya	Petaling Jaya Stadium	25,000
Sabah	Kota Kinabalu	Likas Stadium	35,000
Sarawak	Kuching	Sarawak State Stadium	26,000
Selangor	Shah Alam	Shah Alam Stadium	80,372
LionsXII	Jalan Besar	Jalan Besar Stadium	8,000
Terengganu	Kuala Terengganu	Sultan Ismail Nasiruddin Shah Stadium	15,000

=== Stadium changes ===
- Selangor home stadium was originally the Shah Alam Stadium, but Selangor changed it into the National Stadium, Bukit Jalil after the Shah Alam stadium was being repaired and renovated.
  - The KLFA Stadium was closed down for repairs, meaning both Felda United and Kuala Lumpur were forced to move their home stadiums to the Hang Jebat Stadium which is located in Malacca. The stadium will also be the only venue that will be played at daylight, rather than playing in the night.
- Terengganu had shared stadiums with fellow team neighbours, T-Team since 2011 after the roof collapse of the Sultan Mizan Zainal Abidin Stadium. However, on 19 December 2011, The Terengganu Menteri Besar, Ahmad Said announced that the stadium will undergo repairs and maybe will be usable for Terengganu halfway through the league.

=== Personnel and sponsoring ===
Team	Coach	Captain	Kit manufacturer	Shirt sponsor
Felda United	(Malaysia) E. Elavarasan	Mohd Hamsani Ahmad	Kappa	FELDA Holdings
Johor FC	(Malaysia) Sazali Saidon	Khairul Ismail	Promade	Kulim (Malaysia) Berhad
Kedah	(Croatia) Marijo Tot	Baddrol Bakhtiar	Line 7	PKNK
Kelantan	(Croatia) Bojan Hodak	Mohd Badri Mohd Radzi	Umbro	Happy Prepaid
Kuala Lumpur	(Malaysia) Razip Ismail	Mohd Aslam Haja Najmudeen	Kronos	Kronos
Negeri Sembilan	(Malaysia) Mohd Azraai Khor Abdullah	Muhammad Shukor Adan	Lotto	Negeri Roadstone Sdn Bhd
T-Team	(Malaysia) Yunus Alif	Rosdi Talib	Admiral	Admiral
Perak	(South Korea) Jang Jung	Shahrulnizam Mustapa	Kika	Majlis Bandaraya Ipoh
PKNS	(Malaysia) Abdul Rahman Ibrahim	Mohd Fadhil Mohd Hashim	Lotto	PKNS
Sabah	(Northern Ireland) David McCreery	Hendrik Helmke	Adidas	Grace One
Sarawak	(Netherlands) Robert Alberts	Guy Bwele	StarSport	Naim
Selangor	(Malaysia) Irfan Bakti Abu Salim	Mohd Amri Yahyah	Kappa	Menteri Besar Incorporated
LionsXII	(Singapore) V. Sundramoorthy	Shahril Ishak	Nike	StarHub
Terengganu	(England) Peter James Butler	Mohd Marzuki Yusof	SPECS	Top IT

=== Coaching changes ===
==== Pre-season ====
Club	Outgoing Head Coach	Date of vacancy	Manner of departure	Incoming Head Coach	Date of appointment
Kelantan	Maruthaiah Karathu	16 October 2011	Resigned	Peter James Butler	20 October 2011
Johor FC	Azuan Zain	3 November 2011	Resigned	K. Devan	3 November 2011
Terengganu	Irfan Bakti Abu Salim	2 November 2011	End of Contract	Mat Zan Mat Aris	4 November 2011
Selangor	P. Maniam (caretaker)	4 November 2011	End of caretaker role	Irfan Bakti Abu Salim	4 November 2011

==== In season ====
Club	Outgoing Head Coach	Date of vacancy	Manner of departure	Incoming Head Coach	Date of appointment
Kelantan	Peter James Butler	28 February 2012	Mutual Agreement	Bojan Hodak	2 March 2012
Johor FC	K. Devan	15 April 2012	Resigned	Sazali Saidon	15 April 2012
Terengganu	Mat Zan Mat Aris	7 May 2012	Resigned	Khalid Mohd Dahan (caretaker)	7 May 2012
Terengganu	Khalid Mohd Dahan (caretaker)	14 May 2012	End of caretaker role	Peter James Butler	14 May 2012
Sabah	Justin Ganai	20 June 2012	Sacked	Andrew Majanggim (caretaker)	20 June 2012
Sabah	Andrew Majanggim (caretaker)	5 July 2012	End of caretaker role	David McCreery	5 July 2012
Perak	Norizan Bakar	10 July 2012	Leave of Absence	Jang Jung	23 July 2012
Kedah	Wan Jamak Wan Hassan	10 August 2012	Leave of Absence	Marijo Tot	10 August 2012

=== Sponsorship changes ===
Club	New sponsor	Previous sponsor	Date
Sabah	Grace One		22 December 2011
LionsXII	StarHub		5 January 2012
Kuala Lumpur	Kronos		9 January 2012

== Foreign players ==
Club	Visa 1	Visa 2	AFC Cup	AFC Cup	Former Player(s)
Felda United	(Guadeloupe) Mickaël Antoine-Curier	(Guadeloupe) Eddy Viator	None	None	(Cameroon) Makadji Boukar (Senegal) Pape Ciré Dia
Johor FC	(Brazil) Arthuro Henrique Bernhardt	(Brazil) Fernando de Abreu Ferreira	None	None	(Brazil) Tiago Azulão (Kenya) Pascal Ochieng
Kedah	(Morocco) Abdulfatah Safi	(Croatia) Vedran Gerc	None	None	(Brazil) Danilo Vivaldo (Brazil) Daniel Baroni (Ghana) Hamidan Mohammed
Kelantan	(Nigeria) Obinna Nwaneri	(Lebanon) Mohammed Ghaddar	(Croatia) Mijo Dadic	(Guinea) Keita Mandjou	(Ghana) Denny Antwi (Ghana) Emmanuel Okine (Nigeria) Onyekachi Nwoha
Kuala Lumpur	(Lebanon) Zakaria Charara (on loan from Kelantan)	(Ghana) Emmanuel Okine (on loan from Kelantan)	None	None	None
Negeri Sembilan	(Cameroon) Jean-Emmanuel Effa Owona	(Slovakia) Marian Farbák	None	None	None
T-Team	(Bosnia and Herzegovina) Bojan Petrić	(Brazil) Marco Tulio	None	None	(Zambia) Zachariah Simukonda
Perak	(Slovakia) Michal Kubala	(Cameroon) Albert Dominique Ebossé Bodjongo Dika	None	None	(Serbia) Lazar Popović
PKNS	(Guadeloupe) Michaël Niçoise	(Tunisia) Helmi Loussaief	None	None	(Brazil) Paulo Sérgio
Sabah	(Australia) Brendan Gan	(Germany) Hendrik Helmke	None	None	(Wales) Rhys Weston (Australia) Michael Baird
Sarawak	(Cameroon) Guy Bwele	(Cameroon) Joël Epalle	None	None	(Croatia) Vedran Muratović
Selangor	(Lebanon) Ramez Dayoub	(Croatia) Boško Balaban	None	None	None
LionsXII	None	None	None	None	None
Terengganu	(Brazil) Erison da Silva Santos	(Liberia) Francis Doe	None	None	None

Note:

- Teams participating in AFC Cup 2012, (Kelantan and Terengganu) can employ two extra foreign players, as the AFC allows 4 foreign players, making it a total of four foreign players, but the third and fourth foreign player is only allowed to play for the AFC Cup 2012 Tournament.
- LionsXII will not be permitted to have any foreign players as it is an all Singaporean team.

== League table ==
Pos	Team	Pld	W	D	L	GF	GA	GD	Pts	Qualification or relegation
1	Kelantan (C, Q)	26	18	6	2	53	18	+35	60	2013 AFC Cup group stage
2	LionsXII (Note: LionsXII are not eligible for any AFC competition spots)	26	15	5	6	48	23	+25	50	
3	Selangor (Q)	26	12	7	7	40	26	+14	43	2013 AFC Cup group stage (Note: Qualified as the next highest-placed local team behind Liga Super and 2012 Piala FA winners Kelantan.)
4	Perak	26	13	3	10	40	43	−3	42	
5	Terengganu	26	11	8	7	41	33	+8	41	
6	Negeri Sembilan	26	10	7	9	41	38	+3	37	
7	PKNS	26	8	11	7	35	35	0	35	
8	T-Team	26	10	5	11	35	36	−1	35	
9	Johor FC	26	10	5	11	29	31	−2	35	
10	Felda United	26	11	2	13	25	31	−6	35	
11	Sarawak (R)	26	8	6	12	28	32	−4	30	Relegation play-offs
12	Kedah (R)	26	7	7	12	27	38	−11	28	Relegation play-offs
13	Sabah (R)	26	7	7	12	33	52	−19	28	Relegation play-offs
14	Kuala Lumpur (R)	26	0	5	21	14	53	−39	5	Relegation to 2013 Liga Premier

Source: RSSSF
Rules for classification: 1) points; 2) goal difference; 3) number of goals scored
(C) Champions; (Q) Qualified for the phase indicated; (R) Relegated

== Results ==
Fixtures and Results of the Liga Super 2012 season.

=== Week 1 ===
10 January	Felda United	2–0	Sabah	Hang Jebat Stadium, Ayer Keroh, Malacca
16:45 UTC+08:00	Mohd Raimi Mohd Nor 27'; Yong Kuong Yong 30'	Report		Attendance: 1,000

10 January	LionsXII	1–2	Kelantan	Jalan Besar Stadium, Kallang, Singapore
19:45 UTC+08:00	Baihakki Khaizan 33'	Report	Norshahrul Idlan Talaha 44'; Mohammed Ghaddar 79' (pen.)	Attendance: 8,000; Referee: Mohd. Nafeez Abd. Wahab[Johor]

10 January	Sarawak	2–0	Kuala Lumpur	Sarawak State Stadium, Kuching, Sarawak
20:15 UTC+08:00	K. Ravindran 74'; Mohd Hairol Mokhtar 82'	Report		Attendance: 15,000

10 January	Negeri Sembilan	2–2	Selangor	Tuanku Abdul Rahman Stadium, Paroi, Negeri Sembilan
20:45 UTC+08:00	Effa Owona 4' 34' (pen.)	Report	Amirul Hadi 66'; Safiq Rahim 73'	Attendance: 32,000

10 January	Perak	1–0	Terengganu	Perak Stadium, Ipoh, Perak
20:45 UTC+08:00	Michal Kubala 76'	Report		Attendance: 28,000

10 January	T-Team	3–0	Kedah	Sultan Ismail Nasiruddin Shah Stadium, Kuala Terengganu, Terengganu
20:45 UTC+08:00	Mohd Faiz Subri 11' 29'; Zairo Anuar Zalani 33'	Report		Attendance: 3,000

10 January	PKNS	1–2	Johor FC	Petaling Jaya Stadium, Petaling Jaya, Selangor
20:45 UTC+08:00	Mohd Fauzan Dzulkifli 79'	Report	Riduwan M'aon 25'; Azi Shahril Azmi 76'	Attendance: 2,000

=== Week 2 ===
13 January	Kelantan	1–1	PKNS	Sultan Mohammad IV Stadium, Kota Bharu, Kelantan
20:45 UTC+08:00	Badri Radzi 71'	Report	Mohd Fauzan Dzulkifli 80' (pen.)	Attendance: 25,000

14 January	Kuala Lumpur	0–3	T-Team	Hang Jebat Stadium, Ayer Keroh, Malacca
16:45 UTC+08:00			Zairo Anuar Zalani 32' 80'; Zachariah Simukonda 70'	Attendance: 2,000

14 January	Sabah	2–1	Sarawak	Likas Stadium, Kota Kinabalu, Sabah
20:15 UTC+08:00	Michael Baird 20'; Bobby Gonzales 45'		K. Ravindran 72'	Attendance: 22,000

14 January	Terengganu	3–0	Felda United	Sultan Ismail Nasiruddin Shah Stadium, Kuala Terengganu, Terengganu
20:45 UTC+08:00	Ismail Faruqi 11'; Ashaari Shamsuddin 73' 90+3'			Attendance: 15,000

14 January	Selangor	1–0	Perak	National Stadium, Bukit Jalil, Kuala Lumpur
20:45 UTC+08:00	Safiq Rahim 23'			Attendance: 45,000

14 January	Kedah	0–0	LionsXII	Darul Aman Stadium, Alor Setar, Kedah
19:45 UTC+08:00				Attendance: 25,000

14 January	Johor FC	0–2	Negeri Sembilan	Pasir Gudang Corporation Stadium, Pasir Gudang, Johor
20:45 UTC+08:00			Shakir Ali 49' 55'	Attendance: 13,000; Referee: mohd. zamzaidi katimin melaka

=== Week 3 ===
17 January	Felda United	1–0	Selangor	Hang Jebat Stadium, Ayer Keroh, Malacca
16:45 UTC+08:00	Mohd Azrul Ahmad 28'	Report		Attendance: 5,000

17 January	LionsXII	2–1	Kuala Lumpur	Jalan Besar Stadium, Kallang, Singapore
19:45 UTC+08:00	Aiman Syazwan 43' (o.g.); Shahdan Sulaiman 56'	Report	Fazuan Abdullah 68'	Attendance: 8,000

17 January	Sarawak	0–1	Terengganu	Sarawak State Stadium, Kuching, Sarawak
20:15 UTC+08:00		Report	Francis Doe Forkey 36'	Attendance: 20,000

17 January	T-Team	0–0	Sabah	Sultan Ismail Nasiruddin Shah Stadium, Kuala Terengganu, Terengganu
20:45 UTC+08:00		Report		Attendance: 3,000

17 January	Perak	2–1	Negeri Sembilan	Perak Stadium, Ipoh, Perak
20:45 UTC+08:00	Akmal Rizal 39' 50'	Report	Effa Owona 5'	Attendance: 20,000

17 January	PKNS	0–0	Kedah	Petaling Jaya Stadium, Petaling Jaya, Selangor
20:45 UTC+08:00		Report		Attendance: 4,000

17 January	Kelantan	2–1	Johor FC	Sultan Mohammad IV Stadium, Kota Bharu, Kelantan
20:45 UTC+08:00	Indra Putra Mahayuddin 55'; Norshahrul Idlan Talaha 72'	Report	Mohd Khairul Ismail 63'	Attendance: 28,000

=== Week 4 ===
20 January	Kedah	0–3	Kelantan	Darul Aman Stadium, Alor Setar, Kedah
20:45 UTC+08:00		Report	Mohammed Ghaddar 35' (pen.); Norshahrul Idlan Talaha 78'; Denny Antwi 90+3'	Attendance: 30,000; Referee: Samsudin Ibrahim

21 January	Kuala Lumpur	1–1	PKNS	Hang Jebat Stadium, Ayer Keroh, Malacca
16:45 UTC+08:00	Afiq Azmi 86'	Report	Mohd Fauzan Dzulkifli 76'	Attendance: 1,500

21 January	Sabah	0–1	LionsXII	Likas Stadium, Kota Kinabalu, Sabah
20:15 UTC+08:00		Report	Hariss Harun 19'	Attendance: 25,000

21 January	Terengganu	2–1	T-Team	Sultan Ismail Nasiruddin Shah Stadium, Kuala Terengganu, Terengganu
20:45 UTC+08:00	Francis Doe Forkey 21' 61'	Report	Zairo Anuar Zalani 12' (pen.)	Attendance: 15,000

21 January	Selangor	0–0	Sarawak	National Stadium, Bukit Jalil, Kuala Lumpur
20:45 UTC+08:00		Report		Attendance: 22,000

21 January	Negeri Sembilan	1–0	Felda United	Tuanku Abdul Rahman Stadium, Paroi, Negeri Sembilan
20:45 UTC+08:00	Shahurain Abu Samah 53'	Report		Attendance: 20,000

21 January	Johor FC	0–1	Perak	Pasir Gudang Corporation Stadium, Pasir Gudang, Johor
20:45 UTC+08:00		Report	Shahrom Kalam 78'	Attendance: 18,000

=== Week 5 ===
27 January	PKNS	2–2	Sabah	Petaling Jaya Stadium, Petaling Jaya, Selangor
20:45 UTC+08:00	Michaël Niçoise 44' 55'	Report	Michael Baird 74'; Helmi Remeli 82' (o.g.)	Attendance: 5,000; Referee: Azham Musa

28 January	LionsXII	0–1	Terengganu	Jalan Besar Stadium, Kallang, Singapore
19:45 UTC+08:00		Report	Francis Doe Forkey 79'	Attendance: 8,000

28 January	Sarawak	2–2	Negeri Sembilan	Sarawak State Stadium, Kuching, Sarawak
20:15 UTC+08:00	Kallé Soné 50' (pen.); Zamri Morshidi 83'	Report	Shakir Ali 45'; Shukor Adan 81'	Attendance: 25,000

28 January	T-Team	1–2	Selangor	Sultan Ismail Nasiruddin Shah Stadium, Kuala Terengganu, Terengganu
20:45 UTC+08:00	Zairo Anuar Zalani 49' (pen.)	Report	Ramez Dayoub 35' (pen.); Azidan Sarudin 78'	Attendance: 12,000

28 January	Felda United	1–2	Perak	Hang Jebat Stadium, Ayer Keroh, Malacca
20:45 UTC+08:00	Farderin Kadir 35'	Report	Michal Kubala 11'; Khairan Ezuan Razali 40' (o.g.)	Attendance: 3,000

28 January	Kelantan	3–0	Kuala Lumpur	Sultan Mohammad IV Stadium, Kota Bharu, Kelantan
20:45 UTC+08:00	Norshahrul Idlan Talaha 46'; Badri Radzi 72'; Denny Antwi 77'	Report		Attendance: 25,000

28 January	Kedah	1–3	Johor FC	Darul Aman Stadium, Alor Setar, Kedah
20:45 UTC+08:00	Khyril Muhymeen 81'	Report	Azi Shahril Azmi 44' (pen.); Mohd Riduwan M'aon 65'; Kaironnisam Sahabudin 70'	Attendance: 18,000

=== Week 6 ===
8 February	Sabah	0–0	Kelantan	Likas Stadium, Kota Kinabalu, Sabah
20:15 UTC+08:00				Attendance: 28,000

8 February	Terengganu	1–1	PKNS	Sultan Ismail Nasiruddin Shah Stadium, Kuala Terengganu, Terengganu
20:45 UTC+08:00	Francis Doe Forkey 37'		Helmi Remeli 47'	Attendance: 15,000

8 February	Selangor	1–1	LionsXII	National Stadium, Bukit Jalil, Kuala Lumpur
20:45 UTC+08:00	K. Gurusamy 45'		Shahril Ishak 43'	Attendance: 30,000

8 February	Kuala Lumpur	0–1	Kedah	Hang Jebat Stadium, Ayer Keroh, Malacca
20:45 UTC+08:00			Khyril Muhymeen 6'	Attendance: 4,000

8 February	Negeri Sembilan	2–1	T-Team	Tuanku Abdul Rahman Stadium, Paroi, Negeri Sembilan
20:45 UTC+08:00	Effa Owona 45'; Shakir Ali 65'		Zairo Anuar Zalani 36'	Attendance: 24,000

8 February	Perak	2–1	Sarawak	Perak Stadium, Ipoh, Perak
20:45 UTC+08:00	Michal Kubala 7'; Fahrul Razi 27'		Vedran Muratović 33' (pen.)	Attendance: 30,000

8 February	Johor FC	1–1	Felda United	Pasir Gudang Corporation Stadium, Pasir Gudang, Johor
20:45 UTC+08:00	Mohd Syazwan Zainon 82'		Mohd Azrul Ahmad 85'	Attendance: 14,000

=== Week 7 ===
11 February	LionsXII	3–1	Negeri Sembilan	Jalan Besar Stadium, Kallang, Singapore
19:45 UTC+08:00	Shahril Ishak 30' (pen.) 60'; Shahdan Sulaiman 49'		Mohd Firdaus Azizul 89'	Attendance: 8,000

11 February	Sarawak	2–1	Felda United	Sarawak State Stadium, Kuching, Sarawak
20:15 UTC+08:00	Vedran Muratović 45'; Ashri Chuchu 85'		Mohd Firdaus Faudzi 42'	Attendance: 20,000

11 February	T-Team	2–0	Perak	Sultan Ismail Nasiruddin Shah Stadium, Kuala Terengganu, Terengganu
20:45 UTC+08:00	Bojan Petrić 56'; Zairo Anuar Zalani 88' (pen.)			Attendance: 10,000

11 February	Kuala Lumpur	0–2	Johor FC	Hang Jebat Stadium, Ayer Keroh, Malacca
20:45 UTC+08:00			Mohd Haris Safwan Mohd Kamal 6'; Jasazrin Jamaluddin 83'	Attendance: 1,000

11 February	Kelantan	2–1	Terengganu	Sultan Mohammad IV Stadium, Kota Bharu, Kelantan
20:45 UTC+08:00	Norshahrul Idlan Talaha 37'; Mohd Badri Mohd Radzi 54'		Abdul Manaf Mamat 90+3'	Attendance: 30,000

11 February	PKNS	2–0	Selangor	Petaling Jaya Stadium, Petaling Jaya, Selangor
20:45 UTC+08:00	Rudie Ramli 33'; Mohd Helmi Remeli 60'			Attendance: 20,000

11 February	Kedah	2–2	Sabah	Darul Aman Stadium, Alor Setar, Kedah
20:45 UTC+08:00	Mohd Khyril Muhymeen Zambri 38'; Mohd Faizal Abu Bakar 39'		Sabre Mat Abu 12' (o.g.); Shahrudin Yakup 79'	Attendance: 15,000

=== Week 8 ===
14 February	Sabah	2–0	Kuala Lumpur	Likas Stadium, Kota Kinabalu, Sabah
20:15 UTC+08:00	Rozaimi Abdul Rahman 36'; Michael Baird 46'			Attendance: 15,000

14 February	Terengganu	1–1	Kedah	Sultan Ismail Nasiruddin Shah Stadium, Kuala Terengganu, Terengganu
20:45 UTC+08:00	Mohd Ashaari Shamsuddin 45'		Mohd Khyril Muhymeen Zambri 73'	Attendance: 15,000

14 February	Felda United	0–3	T-Team	Hang Jebat Stadium, Ayer Keroh, Malacca
20:45 UTC+08:00			Mohd Faiz Subri 31' 69'; Zairo Anuar Zalani 84' (pen.)	Attendance: 1,500

14 February	Selangor	2–1	Kelantan	National Stadium, Bukit Jalil, Kuala Lumpur
20:45 UTC+08:00	Mohd Safiq Rahim 46'; Boško Balaban 75'		S. Subramaniam 90'	Attendance: 55,000

14 February	Negeri Sembilan	1–1	PKNS	Tuanku Abdul Rahman Stadium, Paroi, Negeri Sembilan
20:45 UTC+08:00	Jean-Emmanuel Effa Owona 45'		Paulo Sérgio 43' (pen.)	Attendance: 18,000

14 February	Perak	1–2	LionsXII	Perak Stadium, Ipoh, Perak
20:45 UTC+08:00	Michal Kubala 54' (pen.)		Shahril Ishak 35' 74'	Attendance: 32,000

14 February	Johor FC	1–2	Sarawak	Pasir Gudang Corporation Stadium, Pasir Gudang, Johor
20:45 UTC+08:00	Arthuro Bernhardt 21'		Guy Bwele 34'; Mohd Azizan Baba 74'	Attendance: 15,000; Referee: Abu Bakar M.Noor

=== Week 9 ===
2 March	T-Team	1–0	Sarawak	Sultan Ismail Nasiruddin Shah Stadium, Kuala Terengganu, Terengganu
20:45 UTC+08:00	Mohd Faiz Subri 68'			Attendance: 1,000

3 March	Sabah	2–1	Johor FC	Likas Stadium, Kota Kinabalu, Sabah
20:15 UTC+08:00	Rozaimi Abdul Rahman 33'; Shahrudin Yakup 82'		Arthuro Bernhardt 30'	Attendance: 10,000

3 March	Kedah	1–0	Selangor	Darul Aman Stadium, Alor Setar, Kedah
20:45 UTC+08:00	Abdulfatah Safi 84' (pen.)			Attendance: 15,000

3 March	Kuala Lumpur	0–1	Terengganu	Hang Jebat Stadium, Ayer Keroh, Malacca
20:45 UTC+08:00			Francis Doe Forkey 61'	Attendance: 1,000; Referee: Mohd Rahmat Jantan

3 March	PKNS	2–2	Perak	Petaling Jaya Stadium, Petaling Jaya, Selangor
20:45 UTC+08:00	Helmi Remeli 20'; Mohd Fauzan Dzulkifli 56'		Fazrul Hazli 42'; Michal Kubala 79' (pen.)	Attendance: 9,000

4 March	Kelantan	2–1	Negeri Sembilan	Sultan Mohammad IV Stadium, Kota Bharu, Kelantan
20:45 UTC+08:00	Badri Radzi 2'; S. Chanturu 90+3'		Shakir Ali 54'	Attendance: 19,000

6 March	LionsXII	3–1	Felda United	Jalan Besar Stadium, Kallang, Singapore
19:45 UTC+08:00	Hariss Harun 6'; Sufian Anuar 51'; Shahril Ishak 67' (pen.)		Mohd Raimi Mohd Nor 20'	Attendance: 5,000

=== Week 10 ===
16 March	Felda United	0–0	PKNS	Hang Jebat Stadium, Ayer Keroh, Malacca
20:45 UTC+08:00

17 March	Sarawak	0–1	LionsXII	Sarawak State Stadium, Kuching, Sarawak
20:15 UTC+08:00			Shahril Ishak 10' (pen.)

17 March	Perak	0–2	Kelantan	Perak Stadium, Ipoh, Perak
20:45 UTC+08:00			Mohd Daudsu Jamaluddin 10'; Zairul Fitree Ishak 24'	Attendance: 27,000

17 March	Terengganu	6–3	Sabah	Sultan Ismail Nasiruddin Shah Stadium, Kuala Terengganu, Terengganu
20:45 UTC+08:00	Mohd Ashaari Shamsuddin 5'; Francis Doe 13' 78' 15'; Abdul Manaf Mamat 24'; Joseph Kalang 80'		Zainizam Marjan 35'; Brendan Gan 45'; Rozaimi Abdul Rahman 66'

17 March	Selangor	3–0	Kuala Lumpur	National Stadium, Bukit Jalil, Kuala Lumpur
20:45 UTC+08:00	Boško Balaban 56'; P. Gunalan 60'; Amirul Hadi 90+1'			Attendance: 30,000

17 March	Negeri Sembilan	2–1	Kedah	Tuanku Abdul Rahman Stadium, Paroi, Negeri Sembilan
20:45 UTC+08:00	Effa Owona 25'; S. Kunanlan 42'		Baddrol Bakhtiar 60'

17 March	Johor FC	1–3	T-Team	Pasir Gudang Corporation Stadium, Pasir Gudang, Johor
20:45 UTC+08:00	Arthuro Bernhardt 1'		Mohd Faiz Subri 19'; Khairul Izwan Khalid 79'; Azrul Hazran 90'

=== Week 11 ===
30 March	Kuala Lumpur	1–2	Negeri Sembilan	Hang Jebat Stadium, Ayer Keroh, Malacca
20:45 UTC+08:00	Afiq Azmi 8'		Shakir Ali 13' (pen.); Shahurain Abu Samah 77'

30 March	Kedah	3–0	Perak	Darul Aman Stadium, Alor Setar, Kedah
20:45 UTC+08:00	Hamidan Mohammed 45+2' 85'; Syazwan Roslan 78' (o.g.)

31 March	LionsXII	2–1	T-Team	Jalan Besar Stadium, Kallang, Singapore
19:45 UTC+08:00	Shahril Ishak 51'; Shahdan Sulaiman 85' (pen.)		Zairo Anuar Zalani 54'	Attendance: 6,871

31 March	Sabah	1–1	Selangor	Likas Stadium, Kota Kinabalu, Sabah
20:15 UTC+08:00	Michael Baird 3'		P. Gunalan 60'

31 March	Terengganu	0–0	Johor FC	Sultan Ismail Nasiruddin Shah Stadium, Kuala Terengganu, Terengganu
20:45 UTC+08:00

31 March	PKNS	1–4	Sarawak	Petaling Jaya Stadium, Petaling Jaya, Selangor
20:45 UTC+08:00	Khairu Azrin 58'		Mohd Shahrol Saperi 13'; Ashri Chuchu 45+1' 81'; Vedran Muratović 65'

31 March	Kelantan	5–1	Felda United	Sultan Mohammad IV Stadium, Kota Bharu, Kelantan
20:45 UTC+08:00	Onyekachi Nwoha 2' 45'; Norfarhan Mohamad 65'; Indra Putra 66'; Badri Radzi 80'		Azrul Ahmad 4'	Attendance: 20,000

=== Week 12 ===
6 April	T-Team	1–4	PKNS	Sultan Ismail Nasiruddin Shah Stadium, Kuala Terengganu, Terengganu
20:45 UTC+08:00	Mohd Fadzli Saari 29'		Michaël Niçoise 21' 22'; Mohd Fadzli Saari 63' (o.g.); Mohd Helmi Remeli 69'

7 April	Sarawak	1–1	Kelantan	Sarawak State Stadium, Kuching, Sarawak
20:15 UTC+08:00	Guy Bwele 12'		Norfarhan Mohamad 85'	Attendance: 20,000

7 April	Felda United	2–0	Kedah	Hang Jebat Stadium, Ayer Keroh, Malacca
20:45 UTC+08:00	Ahmad Fakri Saarani 51'; Mickaël Antoine-Curier 84'

7 April	Selangor	6–1	Terengganu	Petaling Jaya Stadium, Petaling Jaya, Selangor
20:45 UTC+08:00	Boško Balaban 25'; Solehin 36'; Amri Yahyah 37' 80'; Safiq Rahim 45+1'; Famirul Asraf 86'		Ismail Faruqi 9'

7 April	Negeri Sembilan	2–2	Sabah	Tuanku Abdul Rahman Stadium, Paroi, Negeri Sembilan
20:45 UTC+08:00	Jean-Emmanuel Effa Owona 53'; Muhammad Shukor Adan 57'		Sharudin Yakup 74'; Ronny Harun 77'

7 April	Perak	2–1	Kuala Lumpur	Perak Stadium, Ipoh, Perak
20:45 UTC+08:00	Fahrul Razi 41'; Rafiuddin Rodin 64'		Emmanuel Okine 88'

7 April	Johor FC	0–1	LionsXII	Pasir Gudang Corporation Stadium, Pasir Gudang, Johor
20:45 UTC+08:00			Khairul Nizam 42'

=== Week 13 ===
13 April	Kedah	0–2	Sarawak	Darul Aman Stadium, Alor Setar, Kedah
20:45 UTC+08:00			Mohd Shahrol Saperi 72'; Ashri Chuchu 84'

13 April	Kuala Lumpur	0–4	Felda United	Hang Jebat Stadium, Ayer Keroh, Malacca
20:45 UTC+08:00			Nizad Ayub 23' 37' 73'; Farderin Kadir 87'	Referee: Dennis Anak Sayeng

14 April	Sabah	1–3	Perak	Likas Stadium, Kota Kinabalu, Sabah
20:15 UTC+08:00	Zainizam Marjan 1'		Akmal Rizal 65'; Mafry Balang 67' (o.g.); Lazar Popović 90'

14 April	PKNS	1–0	LionsXII	Petaling Jaya Stadium, Petaling Jaya, Selangor
20:45 UTC+08:00	Michaël Niçoise 80'

14 April	Johor FC	1–1	Selangor	Pasir Gudang Corporation Stadium, Pasir Gudang, Johor
20:45 UTC+08:00	Mohd Riduwan M'aon 19'		Boško Balaban 82'

14 April	Kelantan	1–1	T-Team	Sultan Mohammad IV Stadium, Kota Bharu, Kelantan
20:45 UTC+08:00	Nurul Azwan 43'		Khairul Izwan 74'

14 April	Terengganu	1–0	Negeri Sembilan	Sultan Ismail Nasiruddin Shah Stadium, Kuala Terengganu, Terengganu
20:45 UTC+08:00	S. Kunanlan 70' (o.g.)

=== Week 14 ===
17 April	LionsXII	5–0	PKNS	Jalan Besar Stadium, Kallang, Singapore
19:45 UTC+08:00	Safuwan Baharudin 17'; Shaiful Esah 19'; Sevki Sha'ban 26'; Agu Casmir 53' 87'

17 April	Sarawak	0–2	Kedah	Sarawak State Stadium, Kuching, Sarawak
20:15 UTC+08:00			Vedran Gerc 54' 60'

17 April	Selangor	2–0	Johor FC	Shah Alam Stadium, Shah Alam, Selangor
20:45 UTC+08:00	Boško Balaban 56' 87'

17 April	Negeri Sembilan	1–1	Terengganu	Tuanku Abdul Rahman Stadium, Paroi, Negeri Sembilan
20:45 UTC+08:00	Effa Owona 22'		Francis Doe 5' (pen.)

17 April	Perak	2–2	Sabah	Perak Stadium, Ipoh, Perak
20:45 UTC+08:00	Michal Kubala 35' 90+4'		Zainizam Marjan 45+1' 61'

17 April	Felda United	1–0	Kuala Lumpur	Hang Jebat Stadium, Ayer Keroh, Malacca
20:45 UTC+08:00	Antoine-Curier 56'

17 April	T-Team	1–2	Kelantan	Sultan Ismail Nasiruddin Shah Stadium, Kuala Terengganu, Terengganu
20:45 UTC+08:00	Khairul Izwan Khalid 52'		S. Chanturu 67'; Mohammed Ghaddar 88' (pen.)

=== Week 15 ===
4 May	Sabah	1–0	Felda United	Likas Stadium, Kota Kinabalu, Sabah
20:15 UTC+08:00	Rozaimi Abdul Rahman 20'

4 May	Terengganu	2–2	Perak	Sultan Ismail Nasiruddin Shah Stadium, Kuala Terengganu, Terengganu
20:45 UTC+08:00	Joseph Kalang Tie 1' 84'		Rafiuddin 41'; Bodjongo 65'	Attendance: 20,800

4 May	Kelantan	3–0	LionsXII	Sultan Mohammad IV Stadium, Kota Bharu, Kelantan
20:45 UTC+08:00	S. Chanturu 75'; Norfarhan 77'; Rizal Fahmi 90+'

4 May	Kuala Lumpur	1–1	Sarawak	Hang Jebat Stadium, Ayer Keroh, Malacca
20:45 UTC+08:00	Charara 39'		Joël Epalle 50'

8 May	Johor FC	3–2	PKNS	Pasir Gudang Corporation Stadium, Pasir Gudang, Johor
20:45 UTC+08:00	Arthuro Bernhardt 7' (pen.) 61' 84'		Mohd Norhakim 4'; Michaël Niçoise 74'

8 May	Kedah	1–1	T-Team	Darul Aman Stadium, Alor Setar, Kedah
20:45 UTC+08:00	Vedran Gerc 47'		Mohd Fadzli Shaari 58'

8 May	Selangor	1–3	Negeri Sembilan	Shah Alam Stadium, Shah Alam, Selangor
20:45 UTC+08:00	Boško Balaban 90+3'		Firdaus Azizul 1'; Shakir Ali 34' 63'

=== Week 16 ===
11 May	Perak	2–0	Selangor	Perak Stadium, Ipoh, Perak
20:45 UTC+08:00	Michal Kubala 16'; Bodjongo 85'

12 May	LionsXII	3–3	Kedah	Jalan Besar Stadium, Kallang, Singapore
19:45 UTC+08:00	Shahril Ishak 10'; Sufian Anuar 29'; Baihakki Khaizan 57'		Khyril 21'; Amar Rohidan 62'; Vedran Gerc 65'

12 May	Sarawak	1–0	Sabah	Sarawak State Stadium, Kuching, Sarawak
20:15 UTC+08:00	Joël Epalle 32'

12 May	Felda United	2–1	Terengganu	Hang Jebat Stadium, Ayer Keroh, Malacca
20:45 UTC+08:00	Mohd Raimi Mohd Nor 53'; Mickaël Antoine-Curier 65'		Ismail Faruqi Asha'ri 23'

12 May	T-Team	2–1	Kuala Lumpur	Sultan Ismail Nasiruddin Shah Stadium, Kuala Terengganu, Terengganu
20:45 UTC+08:00	Marco Tulio 2'; Norfazly Alias 79'		Afiq Azmi 29'

12 May	Negeri Sembilan	2–1	Johor FC	Tuanku Abdul Rahman Stadium, Paroi, Negeri Sembilan
20:45 UTC+08:00	Effa Owona 41'; Shakir Ali 69'		Fernando 38' (pen.)

12 May	PKNS	0–3	Kelantan	Petaling Jaya Stadium, Petaling Jaya, Selangor
20:45 UTC+08:00			Norshahrul 27'; Obinna Nwaneri 83'; Mohammed Ghaddar 87'

=== Week 17 ===
15 May	Sabah	1–2	T-Team	Likas Stadium, Kota Kinabalu, Sabah
20:15 UTC+08:00	Hendrik Helmke 32' (pen.)		Mohd Fadzli Shaari 29' 68'

15 May	Selangor	2–1	Felda United	Shah Alam Stadium, Shah Alam, Selangor
20:45 UTC+08:00	Azidan Sarudin 37' 48'		Farderin Kadir 45+1'

15 May	Negeri Sembilan	3–1	Perak	Tuanku Abdul Rahman Stadium, Paroi, Negeri Sembilan
20:45 UTC+08:00	Effa Owona 24' 66'; Marian Farbák 83'		Michal Kubala 6' (pen.)

15 May	Kedah	1–3	PKNS	Darul Aman Stadium, Alor Setar, Kedah
20:45 UTC+08:00	Vedran Gerc 59' (pen.)		Helmi Loussaief 45'; Mohd Nizaruddin Yusof 51'; Rudie Ramli 79'

15 May	Kuala Lumpur	0–0	LionsXII	Hang Jebat Stadium, Ayer Keroh, Malacca
20:45 UTC+08:00				Referee: Wan Tarmizi Wan Ibrahim

15 May	Terengganu	2–2	Sarawak	Sultan Ismail Nasiruddin Shah Stadium, Kuala Terengganu, Terengganu
20:45 UTC+08:00	Abdul Hadi Yahya 47'; Baiano 68'		Azizan Saperi 39'; Khairul Azahar Eidros 54'	Referee: Zamzaidi Katimin

26 May	Johor FC	0–0	Kelantan	Pasir Gudang Corporation Stadium, Pasir Gudang, Johor
20:45 UTC+08:00				Referee: Abu Bakar M. Noor

=== Week 18 ===
15 June	T-Team	0–3	Terengganu	Sultan Ismail Nasiruddin Shah Stadium, Kuala Terengganu, Terengganu
20:45 UTC+08:00			Abdul Manaf Mamat 26' 42'; Abdul Hadi Yahya 78'

16 June	LionsXII	9–0	Sabah	Jalan Besar Stadium, Kallang, Singapore
19:45 UTC+08:00	Agu Casmir 19'; Hariss Harun 22' 41' 73'; Shahdan Sulaiman 62' 65'; Irwan Shah 68'; Sufian Anuar 84'; Shahrul Azhar Ture 88' (o.g.)			Referee: Zamzaidi Katimin

16 June	Sarawak	0–1	Selangor	Sarawak State Stadium, Kuching, Sarawak
20:15 UTC+08:00			Bosko Balaban 8'

16 June	Felda United	1–0	Negeri Sembilan	Hang Jebat Stadium, Ayer Keroh, Malacca
20:45 UTC+08:00	Farderin Kadir 75'			Referee: Mohd Fairuzi Mat Desa

16 June	Perak	2–1	Johor FC	Perak Stadium, Ipoh, Perak
20:45 UTC+08:00	Rafiuddin Roddin 10'; Albert Ebossé Bodjongo 49'		Arthuro Henrique Bernhardt 69'

16 June	PKNS	1–1	Kuala Lumpur	Petaling Jaya Stadium, Petaling Jaya, Selangor
20:45 UTC+08:00	Rudie Ramli 66'		Stanley Bernard 23'

16 June	Kelantan	2–1	Kedah	Sultan Mohammad IV Stadium, Kota Bharu, Kelantan
20:45 UTC+08:00	Mohd Fazliata Taib 45' (o.g.); Mohammed Ghaddar 54'		Mohd Khyril Muhymeen Zambri 87'

=== Week 19 ===
19 June	Sabah	0–4	PKNS	Likas Stadium, Kota Kinabalu, Sabah
20:15 UTC+08:00			Nizaruddin Yusof 45'; Helmi Remeli 64'; Rudie Ramli 67'; Fadhil Hashim 80'

19 June	Kuala Lumpur	0–1	Kelantan	Sultan Mohammad IV Stadium, Kota Bharu, Kelantan ^{1}
20:45 UTC+08:00			Mohammed Ghaddar 60' (pen.)

- ^{1} The venue was changed from Kuala Lumpur FA original venue at Hang Jebat Stadium, Melaka to Kelantan FA venue at Kota Bharu at the request of Kuala Lumpur FA.

19 June	Terengganu	0–1	LionsXII	Sultan Ismail Nasiruddin Shah Stadium, Kuala Terengganu, Terengganu
20:45 UTC+08:00			Sufian Anuar 90'

19 June	Selangor	5–0	T-Team	Shah Alam Stadium, Shah Alam, Selangor
20:45 UTC+08:00	Safiq Rahim 6' (pen.); Ramez Dayoub 45+1'; Boško Balaban 63'; R. Surendran 86'; Fitri Shazwan 90'

19 June	Negeri Sembilan	3–1	Sarawak	Tuanku Abdul Rahman Stadium, Paroi, Negeri Sembilan
20:45 UTC+08:00	Shahurain Abu Samah 32'; Alif Shamsudin 50'; Effa Owona 54'		Khairul Azahar Eidros 56'

19 June	Perak	2–1	Felda United	Perak Stadium, Ipoh, Perak
20:45 UTC+08:00	Shafiq Jamal 76'; Fazrul Hazli 84'		Fakri 1'

19 June	Johor FC	2–1	Kedah	Pasir Gudang Corporation Stadium, Pasir Gudang, Johor
20:45 UTC+08:00	Riduwan M'aon 31'; Khairul Ismail 45'		Fiqry 82'

=== Week 20 ===
20 March	LionsXII	1–1	Selangor	Jalan Besar Stadium, Kallang, Singapore
19:45 UTC+08:00	Sufian Anuar 62'		Boško Balaban 81'

22 June	Felda United	0–1	Johor FC	Hang Jebat Stadium, Ayer Keroh, Malacca
20:45 UTC+08:00			Mohd Izuan Jarudin 54'

23 June	Sarawak	1–2	Perak	Sarawak State Stadium, Kuching, Sarawak
20:15 UTC+08:00	Azizan Saperi 45'		Bodjongo 10'; Michal Kubala 24' (pen.)

23 June	T-Team	1–1	Negeri Sembilan	Sultan Ismail Nasiruddin Shah Stadium, Kuala Terengganu, Terengganu
20:45 UTC+08:00	Mohd Faiz Subri 62'		Effa Owona 54'

23 June	PKNS	2–2	Terengganu	Petaling Jaya Stadium, Petaling Jaya, Selangor
20:45 UTC+08:00	Mohd Fauzan Dzulkifli 31'; Michaël Niçoise 37' (pen.)		Abdul Shukur Jusoh 3'; Mohd Ashaari Shamsuddin 90'

23 June	Kelantan	2–0	Sabah	Sultan Mohammad IV Stadium, Kota Bharu, Kelantan
20:45 UTC+08:00	Rizal Fahmi 6'; Indra Putra 90'

23 June	Kedah	2–1	Kuala Lumpur	Darul Aman Stadium, Alor Setar, Kedah
20:45 UTC+08:00	Faizal 37'; Vedran Gerc 72' (pen.)		Zakaria Charara 80' (pen.)

=== Week 21 ===
3 April	Negeri Sembilan	2–4	LionsXII	Tuanku Abdul Rahman Stadium, Paroi, Negeri Sembilan
20:45 UTC+08:00	G. Mahathevan 32'; Shukor Adan 86'		Safuwan Baharudin 14'; Khairul Nizam 20'; Shahril Ishak 41'; Shahdan Sulaiman 70'

26 June	Sabah	1–0	Kedah	Likas Stadium, Kota Kinabalu, Sabah
20:15 UTC+08:00	Juffrey Omopor 52'

26 June	Terengganu	2–2	Kelantan	Sultan Ismail Nasiruddin Shah Stadium, Kuala Terengganu, Terengganu
20:45 UTC+08:00	Hadi Yahya 40'; Muslim Ahmad 50'		Norfarhan 5'; Badri Radzi 20'

26 June	Felda United	0–1	Sarawak	Hang Jebat Stadium, Ayer Keroh, Malacca
20:45 UTC+08:00			Joel Epalle 38'

26 June	Selangor	1–0	PKNS	Shah Alam Stadium, Shah Alam, Selangor
20:45 UTC+08:00	Amri Yahyah 44'

26 June	Perak	3–2	T-Team	Perak Stadium, Ipoh, Perak
20:45 UTC+08:00	Mohd Nazri 39'; Mohd Failee 64'; Bodjongo 67'		Faiz Subri 19', 70'

26 June	Johor FC	1–0	Kuala Lumpur	Pasir Gudang Corporation Stadium, Pasir Gudang, Johor
20:45 UTC+08:00	Khairul Ismail 58'

=== Week 22 ===
10 April	LionsXII	2–1	Perak	Jalan Besar Stadium, Kallang, Singapore
19:45 UTC+08:00	Shahdan Sulaiman 43' (pen.); Irwan Shah 87'		Michal Kubala 49'

29 June	Kelantan	1–0	Selangor	Sultan Mohammad IV Stadium, Kota Bharu, Kelantan
20:45 UTC+08:00	Mohammed Ghaddar 25'

30 June	Sarawak	3–1	Johor FC	Sarawak State Stadium, Kuching, Sarawak
20:15 UTC+08:00	Yosri Derma Raju 52'; Guy Bwele 59'; Zamri Morshidi 64'		Haris Safwan 71'

30 June	Kuala Lumpur	2–4	Sabah	Likas Stadium, Kota Kinabalu, Sabah^{1}
20:15 UTC+08:00	Zakaria Charara 73' (pen.); Afiq Azmi 82'		Razid Gafar 11'; Ahmad Jihad Ismail 53' (o.g.); Radzi Hussin 77'; Leopold Alphonso 88'

- ^{1} The venue was changed from Kuala Lumpur FA original venue at Hang Jebat Stadium, Melaka to Sabah FA venue at Kota Kinabalu at the request of Kuala Lumpur FA.

30 June	T-Team	0–1	Felda United	Sultan Ismail Nasiruddin Shah Stadium, Kuala Terengganu, Terengganu
20:45 UTC+08:00			Yong Kuong Yong 18'

30 June	PKNS	2–1	Negeri Sembilan	Petaling Jaya Stadium, Petaling Jaya, Selangor
20:45 UTC+08:00	Norhafizzuan 36'; Fauzan Dzulkifli 58'		Firdaus Azizul 7'

30 June	Kedah	2–1	Terengganu	Darul Aman Stadium, Alor Setar, Kedah
20:45 UTC+08:00	Khyril Muhymeen 21'; Baddrol Bakhtiar 69'		Muslim Ahmad 3'

=== Week 23 ===
8 May	Felda United	0–2	LionsXII	Hang Jebat Stadium, Ayer Keroh, Malacca
20:45 UTC+08:00			Shaiful Esah 31'; Shahdan Sulaiman 76'

3 July	Sarawak	0–1	T-Team	Sarawak State Stadium, Kuching, Sarawak
20:15 UTC+08:00			Fadzli Saari 30'

3 July	Perak	1–2	PKNS	Perak Stadium, Ipoh, Perak
20:45 UTC+08:00	Akmal Rizal 42'		Fazli Baharudin 79' 82'

3 July	Terengganu	2–1	Kuala Lumpur	Sultan Ismail Nasiruddin Shah Stadium, Kuala Terengganu, Terengganu
20:45 UTC+08:00	Francis Doe 13' 84'		Emmanuel Okine 30' (pen.)

3 July	Selangor	1–1	Kedah	Shah Alam Stadium, Shah Alam, Selangor
20:45 UTC+08:00	Boško Balaban 63'		Khyril Muhymeen 89'

3 July	Johor FC	2–1	Sabah	Pasir Gudang Corporation Stadium, Pasir Gudang, Johor
20:45 UTC+08:00	Syazwan Zainon 3'; Haris Safwan 45+3' (pen.)		Sharudin Yakup 36'

3 July	Negeri Sembilan	2–3	Kelantan	Tuanku Abdul Rahman Stadium, Paroi, Negeri Sembilan
20:45 UTC+08:00	Firdaus Azizul 13'; Shukor Adan 85'		Azlan Ismail 49'; Mohammed Ghaddar 66'; Indra Putra 71'

=== Week 24 ===
22 May	LionsXII	3–0	Sarawak	Jalan Besar Stadium, Kallang, Singapore
19:45 UTC+08:00	Safuwan Baharudin 7'; Agu Casmir 36' 63'

7 July	Sabah	1–3	Terengganu	Likas Stadium, Kota Kinabalu, Sabah
20:15 UTC+08:00	Rozaimi 6'		Joseph Kalang Tie 4'; Ashaari Shamsuddin 44'; Reithaudin Emran 77' (o.g.)

7 July	Kedah	0–2	Negeri Sembilan	Darul Aman Stadium, Alor Setar, Kedah
20:45 UTC+08:00			Effa Owona 42'; S. Kunanlan 82'

7 July	T-Team	1–1	Johor FC	Sultan Ismail Nasiruddin Shah Stadium, Kuala Terengganu, Terengganu
20:45 UTC+08:00	Fadzli Saari 56'		Haris Safwan 32'

7 July	Kuala Lumpur	0–4	Selangor	Shah Alam Stadium, Shah Alam, Selangor^{1}
20:45 UTC+08:00			Azidan Sarudin 35'; Amri Yahyah 46' 79'; Ramez Dayoub 62'

- ^{1} The venue was changed from Kuala Lumpur FA original venue at Hang Jebat Stadium, Melaka to Selangor FA venue at Shah Alam at the request of Kuala Lumpur FA.

7 July	PKNS	0–1	Felda United	Petaling Jaya Stadium, Petaling Jaya, Selangor
20:45 UTC+08:00			Farderin Kadir 20'

7 July	Kelantan	6–0	Perak	Sultan Mohammad IV Stadium, Kota Bharu, Kelantan
20:45 UTC+08:00	Indra Putra 17' 30' 49'; Mohammed Ghaddar 19'; Badri Radzi 23'; Nurul Azwan 39'

=== Week 25 ===
10 July	Sarawak	0–0	PKNS	Sarawak State Stadium, Kuching, Sarawak
20:15 UTC+08:00

10 July	Felda United	1–0	Kelantan	Hang Jebat Stadium, Ayer Keroh, Malacca
20:45 UTC+08:00	Antoine-Curier 37'

10 July	T-Team	2–1	LionsXII	Sultan Ismail Nasiruddin Shah Stadium, Kuala Terengganu, Terengganu
20:45 UTC+08:00	Azrul Hazran 6'; Rosdi Talib 71' (pen.)		Bojan Petrić 26' (o.g.)

10 July	Selangor	3–2	Sabah	Shah Alam Stadium, Shah Alam, Selangor
20:45 UTC+08:00	Amri Yahyah 15'; Solehin 29'; Boško Balaban 47'		Brendan Gan 84'; Rozaimi 88'

10 July	Negeri Sembilan	1–1	Kuala Lumpur	Tuanku Abdul Rahman Stadium, Paroi, Negeri Sembilan
20:45 UTC+08:00	Shakir Ali 55'		Pritam Singh 90+1'

10 July	Perak	1–2	Kedah	Perak Stadium, Ipoh, Perak
20:45 UTC+08:00	Bodjongo 38'		Baddrol Bakhtiar 45' (pen.); Khyril 90+1'

10 July	Johor FC	2–0	Terengganu	Pasir Gudang Corporation Stadium, Pasir Gudang, Johor
20:45 UTC+08:00	Fernando 27'; Shahrizal Saad 35'

=== Week 26 ===
14 July	LionsXII	0–1	Johor FC	Jalan Besar Stadium, Kallang, Singapore
20:45 UTC+08:00			Shahrizal Saad 27'

14 July	PKNS	2–1	T-Team	Petaling Jaya Stadium, Petaling Jaya, Selangor
20:45 UTC+08:00	Azrif Nasrulhaq 1'; Fazli Baharudin 19'		Fadzli Saari 58'

14 July	Kelantan	3–1	Sarawak	Sultan Mohammad IV Stadium, Kota Bharu, Kelantan
20:45 UTC+08:00	Badri Radzi 61'; Norfarhan 65' 67'		Hairol Mokhtar 69'

14 July	Kedah	1–2	Felda United	Darul Aman Stadium, Alor Setar, Kedah
20:45 UTC+08:00	Khyril 62'		Antoine-Curier 29'; Yong Kuong Yong 36'

14 July	Kuala Lumpur	2–5	Perak	Perak Stadium, Ipoh, Perak^{1}
20:45 UTC+08:00	Khairul Anuar 28'; Zakaria Charara 84'		Michal Kubala 19' (pen.) 90'; Bodjongo 30'; Shafiq Jamal 35'; Akmal Rizal 75'

- ^{1} The venue was changed from Kuala Lumpur FA original venue at Hang Jebat Stadium, Melaka to Perak FA venue at Ipoh at the request of Kuala Lumpur FA.

14 July	Sabah	3–1	Negeri Sembilan	Likas Stadium, Kota Kinabalu, Sabah
20:45 UTC+08:00	Hendrik Helmke 27' (pen.); Sharudin Yakup 76'; Bobby Gonzales 90+2'		Effa Owona 41'

14 July	Terengganu	3–0	Selangor	Sultan Ismail Nasiruddin Shah Stadium, Kuala Terengganu, Terengganu
20:45 UTC+08:00	Francis Doe 9' 42'; Nordin Alias 48'

== Round table ==
Home \ Away	FEL	JFC	KED	KEL	KLU	NSE	T-T	PRK	PKN	SAB	SWK	SEL	LNS	TRG
Felda United		0–1	2–0	1–0	1–0	1–0	0–3	1–2	0–0	2–0	0–1	1–0	0–2	2–1
Johor FC	1–1		2–1	0–0	1–0	0–2	1–3	0–1	3–2	2–1	1–2	1–1	0–1	2–0
Kedah	1–2	1–3		0–3	2–1	0–2	1–1	3–0	1–3	2–2	0–2	1–0	0–0	2–1
Kelantan	5–1	2–1	2–1		3–0	2–1	1–1	6–0	1–1	2–0	3–1	1–0	3–0	2–1
Kuala Lumpur FA	0–4	0–2	0–1	0–1		1–2	0–3	2–5	1–1	2–4	1–1	0–4	0–0	0–1
Negeri Sembilan	1–0	2–1	2–1	2–3	1–1		2–1	3–1	1–1	2–2	3–1	2–2	2–4	1–1
T–Team	0–1	1–1	3–0	1–2	2–1	1–1		2–0	1–4	0–0	1–0	1–2	2–1	0–3
Perak	2–1	2–1	1–2	0–2	2–1	2–1	3–2		1–2	2–2	2–1	2–0	1–2	1–0
PKNS	0–1	1–2	0–0	0–3	1–1	2–1	2–1	2–2		2–2	1–4	2–0	1–0	2–2
Sabah	1–0	2–1	1–0	0–0	2–0	3–1	1–2	1–3	0–4		2–1	1–1	0–1	1–3
Sarawak	2–1	3–1	0–2	1–1	2–0	2–2	0–1	1–2	0–0	1–0		0–1	0–1	0–1
Selangor	2–1	2–0	1–1	2–1	3–0	1–3	5–0	1–0	1–0	3–2	0–0		1–1	6–1
LionsXII	3–1	0–1	3–3	1–2	2–1	3–1	2–1	2–1	5–0	9–0	3–0	1–1		0–1
Terengganu	3–0	0–0	1–1	2–2	2–1	1–0	2–1	2–2	1–1	6–3	2–2	3–0	0–1	

Updated to match(es) played on 14 July 2012. Source: Liga Super
Legend: Blue = home team win; Yellow = draw; Red = away team win.

== Play-offs ==
=== Promotion/Relegation ===
The play-off matches to determine promotion and relegation will be held at Hang Tuah Stadium and Hang Jebat Stadium, Malacca from 17 to 19 July 2012, as next season Liga Super will be reduced to 12 teams from 14 teams this season. Team that finished 11th in the Liga Super, Sarawak will meet second placed team in Liga Premier, Pahang while team that finished 12th in the Liga Super, Kedah will meet team that finished 13th in the Liga Super, Sabah. The winner of both semi-final match will meet in the final to determine who will stay in the 2013 Liga Super. The winner will stay in the Liga Super; the other 3 teams will be relegated to 2013 Liga Premier.

Semi-final 1

17 July 2012
20:45 UTC+08:00

Pahang	1–0	Sarawak
Saiful Nizam 89'

Hang Jebat Stadium, Malacca

Semi-final 2

17 July 2012
20:45 UTC+08:00

Kedah	1–0	Sabah
Syamim Alif 90+1'

Hang Tuah Stadium, Malacca

Final

19 July 2012
20:45 UTC+08:00

Pahang	2–2	Kedah
Hafiz Kamal 7'; Boris Kochkin 43' (pen.)		Khyril Muhymeen 49'; Baddrol Bakhtiar 68'
Penalties
Maycon (penalty missed); Zaiza (penalty scored); Faizol Hussien (penalty scored); Azamuddin (penalty missed); Shahrizan Salleh (penalty missed); Jalaluddin Jaafar (penalty scored)	3–2	(penalty scored) Fauzi Nan; (penalty missed) Fazliata Taib; (penalty missed) See Kok Luen; (penalty scored) Baddrol Bakhtiar; (penalty missed) Syamim Alif; (penalty missed) Khairul Helmi

Hang Jebat Stadium, Malacca

== Season statistics ==
=== Top scorers ===
Rank	Player	Club	Goals
1	Jean-Emmanuel Effa Owona	Negeri Sembilan	15
2	Francis Doe Forkey	Terengganu	14
3	Michal Kubala	Perak	13
4	Boško Balaban	Selangor	12
5	Shahril Ishak	LionsXII	10
5	Ahmad Shakir Mohd Ali	Negeri Sembilan	10
5	Mohd Khyril Muhymeen Zambri	Kedah	10
8	Mohammed Ghaddar	Kelantan	9
8	Zairo Anuar Zalani	T-Team	9
8	Mohd Faiz Subri	T-Team	9
11	Shahdan Sulaiman	LionsXII	8
11	Mohd Badri Mohd Radzi	Kelantan	8

=== Own goals ===
Player	For	Club
Aiman Syazwan Abdullah	LionsXII	Kuala Lumpur
Mohd Helmi Remeli	Sabah	PKNS
Khairan Ezuan Razali	Perak	Felda United
Mohd Sabre Mat Abu	Sabah	Kedah
Mohd Syazwan Mohd Roslan	Kedah	Perak
Mohd Fadzli Saari	PKNS	T-Team
Mafry Balang	Perak	Sabah
S. Kunanlan	Terengganu	Negeri Sembilan
Shahrul Azhar Ture	LionsXII	Sabah
Mohd Fazliata Taib	Kelantan	Kedah
Ahmad Jihad Ismail	Sabah	Kuala Lumpur
Mohd Reithaudin Awang Emran	Terengganu	Sabah
Bojan Petrić	LionsXII	T-Team

=== Hat-tricks ===
Player	For	Against	Result	Date
Francis Doe Forkey	Terengganu	Sabah	6–3	17 March 2012
Mohd Nizad Ayub	Felda United	Kuala Lumpur	4–0	13 April 2012
Arthuro Henrique Bernhardt	Johor FC	PKNS	3–2	8 May 2012
Hariss Harun	LionsXII	Sabah	9–0	16 June 2012
Indra Putra Mahayuddin	Kelantan	Perak	6–0	7 July 2012

=== Scoring ===
- First goal of the season: Mohd Raimi Mohd Nor for Felda United against Sabah (10 January 2012)
- Last goal of the season: Bobby Gonzales for Sabah against Negeri Sembilan (14 July 2012)
- Fastest goal of the season: 33 Seconds – Arthuro Henrique Bernhardt for Johor FC against T-Team (17 March 2012)
- First own goal of the season: 41 Minutes – Aiman Syazwan Abdullah of Kuala Lumpur for LionsXII (17 January 2012)
- Widest winning margin: 9 goals
  - LionsXII 9–0 Sabah (16 June 2012)
- Highest scoring game: 9 goals
  - Terengganu 6–3 Sabah (17 March 2012)
  - LionsXII 9–0 Sabah (16 June 2012)
- Most goals scored in a match by a single team: 9 goals
  - LionsXII 9–0 Sabah (16 June 2012)
- Most goals scored in a match by a losing team: 3 goals
  - Terengganu 6–3 Sabah (17 March 2012)
- Widest away winning margin: 4 goals
  - Kuala Lumpur 0–4 Felda United (13 April 2012)
  - Sabah 0–4 PKNS (19 June 2012)
  - Kuala Lumpur 2 – 4 Sabah (30 June 2012)
- Most goals scored by an away team: 4 goals
  - PKNS 1–4 Sarawak (31 March 2012)
  - T-Team 1–4 PKNS (6 April 2012)
  - Kuala Lumpur 0–4 Felda United (13 April 2012)
  - Sabah 0–4 PKNS (19 June 2012)

=== Clean sheets ===
- Most clean sheets: 11
  - Kelantan
- Fewest clean sheets: 1
  - Kuala Lumpur

== See also ==
- List of Liga Super seasons
- 2012 Liga Premier
- 2012 Liga FAM
- 2012 Piala FA
