= 2014 Sarawak FA season =

Sarawak
2014 season
- President: Datu Sudarsono Osman
- Head Coach: Robert Alberts
- Stadium: Stadium Negeri
- Super League: 7th
- FA Cup: Quarter-finals
- Malaysia Cup: Group Stage
- Top goalscorer: League: S. Chanturu (6); All: S. Chanturu (8)
Home colours	Away colours	Third colours

The 2014 season was Sarawak's first season in the Malaysia Super League since being relegated in 2012. Sarawak kicked off their 2014 season against ATM in Selayang and lost 2–0.

This was Robert Alberts' fourth season in charge after taking over from Haji Mohd Zaki Sheikh Ahmad in 2011.

Sarawak competed in two domestic cups – the FA Cup and the Malaysia Cup – starting the FA Cup tournaments in the first round. They reached the quarter-finals of the FA Cup before being eliminated by Felda United on away goals.

== Pre-season and friendlies ==
=== Indonesia pre-season tour ===
Sarawak arranged pre season friendly in Indonesia with Indonesia clubs. Sarawak played 4 teams during the pre season. Sarawak and Arema Malang game was cancelled due to uncertain reasons.

Date	Opponents	H / A	Result F–A	Scorers	Attendance
9 December 2013	Metro FC	N	1-1	Akmal '	100
11 December 2013	PSM Makassar	N	1-2	Joseph 41'	50
14 December 2013	Arema Malang		Cancelled		
15 December 2013	Metro FC	N	4-1	Gyepes (2) ', Alireza ', Joseph'	
19 December 2013	Persepam Madura	N	0-2		

=== Friendlies ===
Date	Opponents	H / A	Result F–A	Scorers	Attendance
23 December 2013	Sabah	H	1-1	Alireza '	8,000
29 December 2013	Young Crocs	H	13-0		
4 January 2014	Sabah	A	0-1		500
11 January 2014	SPA FC	H	5-0	Rasyid 4', Joseph (2)31'51', Salibašić 60', Alireza 67'	7,000

== 2014 Malaysia Super League ==
=== Results summary ===
Overall								Home						Away					
Pld	W	D	L	GF	GA	GD	Pts	W	D	L	GF	GA	GD	W	D	L	GF	GA	GD
18	9	1	8	25	26	−1	28	6	0	3	15	10	+5	3	1	5	10	16	−6

=== Matches ===
Date	Opponents	H / A	Result F–A	Scorers	Attendance
18 January 2014	ATM	A	0-2		5,000
25 January 2014	Kelantan	H	0-1		25,000
28 January 2014	Sime Darby	H	3-0	Joseph 5' Gyepes 45' Janjus 68'	8,000
7 February 2014	PKNS	A	2-0	Janjus 9' Gyepes 16'	2,500
15 February 2014	Perak	H	1-0	Janjus 8'	17,500
8 March 2014	T-Team	A	0-2		2,000
8 March 2014	LionsXII	H	3-1	Chanturu (2) 16' 35' Rasyid 75'	17,500
22 March 2014	Pahang	A	1-3	Rasyid 90+1'	20,000
25 March 2014	Selangor	H	0-2	andik virmansyah 25' thamil arasu 52'	22,000
29 March 2014	JDT I	A	1-1	Chanturu 16'	30,000
4 April 2014	Terengganu	H	1-3	Rasyid 29'	15,000
11 April 2014	Terengganu	A	2-1	Chanturu 3' Griffiths 79'	7,000
15 April 2014	ATM	H	3-2	Junior 41' Chanturu 59' Fazly (OG) 73'	18,000
18 April 2014	Kelantan	A	1-0	Griffiths 52'	6,000
10 May 2014	Sime Darby	A	2-3	Chanturu 7' Griffiths 22'	5,000
16 May 2014	PKNS	H	2-1	Joseph 58' Salibašić 84'	17,000
23 May 2014	Perak	A	1-4	Griffiths 63'	7,000
10 June 2014	T-Team	H	2-0	Salibašić 27'Joseph 55'	17,000
14 June 2014	Lions XII	A	0-0		
17 June 2014	Pahang	H	1-1	Joseph kallang tie 47' matias conti 34'	
21 June 2014	Selangor	A	0-3	Paulo rangel 42'61' hazwan bakri 65'	
25 June 2014	JDT I	H	0-1	jorge perreyra diaz 66'	

=== Results by matchday ===
Matchday	1	2	3	4	5	6	7	8	9	10	11	12	13	14	15	16	17	18	19	20	21	22
Ground	A	H	H	A	H	A	H	A	H	A	H	A	H	A	A	H	A	H	A	H	A	H
Result	L	L	W	W	W	L	W	L	L	D	L	W	W	W	L	W	L	W	D	D	L	L
Position	11	12	8	4	3	6	3	6	9	7	8	7	7	5 (Note: Sarawak drop to 5th position due to FAM awarded Terengganu FA a 3-0 win against Kelantan FA.)	5	5	7	6	5			

Updated to match(es) played on 17 May 2014. Source: pengurusanbolasepakfam.org.my
A = Away; H = Home; W = Win; D = Draw; L = Loss

== 2014 Malaysia FA Cup ==
The draw for the Malaysia FA Cup 2014 was held at Blue Wave Hotel, Shah Alam on 29 November 2013. In 2014 Malaysia FA Cup Sarawak FA will meet Penang at home on 21 January 2014. Sarawak entered the FA Cup at the First Round stage. They were drawn against Premier League side Penang FA.

First round, Sarawak played Penang FA in their home turf. Sarawak struggle to beat Penang defensive line especially their on form goalkeeper G. Jeevananthan makes wonderful saves. Sarawak only in front after 76th minutes with Alireza Abbasfard put the ball into the net. Penang however have to play with 10 men after their players was sent off by referee. Despite with 10 men, Penang did not give up and equalize with wonderful free kicks. The match entered extra times and Gábor Gyepes makes a solo run to beat Jeeva.

Second round, Sarawak were drawn with Selangor FA and force to play an away game at MBPJ stadium, midweek 4.15 pm afternoon fixture. Sarawak were in front with stunning header from Zamri Morshidi in 33 minutes from a long throw from Ronny Harun. Sarawak were forced to play with 10 men after goalkeeper Sani Anuar Kamsani were sent off by referee after a reckless tackle. Despite attacking from the Selangor camp, Sarawak shown a solid defensive game throughout the game and through to Quarter finals.

Quarter finals, at Stadium Selayang Sarawak were drawn with Felda United. Sarawak first leg away game ended goalless with neither sides put the ball into the net. In Stadium Negeri, Sarawak were held drawn 2-2 and Felda were through to semis with away goals advantage.

Date	Round	Opponents	H / A	Result F–A	Scorers	Attendance
21 January 2014	Round 1	Penang	H	2-1 (aet)	Alireza 76', Gyepes 100'	8,000
4 February 2014	Round 2	Selangor	A	1-0	Zamri 33'	6,000
11 February 2014	Quarter Final 1st Leg	Felda United	A	0-0		3,000
18 February 2014	Quarter final 2nd Leg	Felda United	H	2-2	Joseph 17', Akmal 79'	18,000

== Squad statistics ==
No.	Pos.	Name	League		FA Cup		Malaysia Cup		Asia		Other		Total		Discipline	
No.	Pos.	Name	Apps	Goals	Apps	Goals	Apps	Goals	Apps	Goals	Apps	Goals	Apps	Goals	Yellow card	Red card
1	GK	(Malaysia) Mohd Fadzley Rahim	6	0	1(1)	0	0	0	0	0	0	0	4(1)	0	1	0
2	DF	(Malaysia) Ronny Harun	15	0	4	0	0	0	0	0	0	0	12	0	3	0
3	MF	(Malaysia) Mazwandi Zakaria	3(4)	0	0(1)	0	0	0	0	0	0	0	2(5)	0	1	0
4	DF	(Malaysia) Mafry Balang	9	0	2	0	0	0	0	0	0	0	9	0	2	0
5	MF	(Serbia) Milorad Janjus	5(1)	3	2	0	0	0	0	0	0	0	7(1)	3	1	0
6	MF	(Malaysia) Lot Abu Hassan	9(4)	0	2(2)	0	0	0	0	0	0	0	11(4)	0	3	0
7	MF	(Malaysia) Zamri Morshidi	2(4)	0	1(2)	1	0	0	0	0	0	0	3(6)	1	3	0
8	MF	(Malaysia) Reeshafiq Alwi	3(1)	0	2(1)	0	0	0	0	0	0	0	5(2)	0	0	0
9	MF	(Malaysia) Mohd Rasyid Aya	11(3)	3	3	0	0	0	0	0	0	0	11(3)	2	4	0
10	MF	(Bosnia and Herzegovina) Muamer Salibašić	1(4)	1	0	0	0	0	0	0	0	0	1(1)	0	0	0
11	MF	(Malaysia) Ashri Chuchu	6(6)	0	4	0	0	0	0	0	0	0	10(5)	0	0	0
12	DF	(Malaysia) Ramesh Lai Ban Huat	15	0	4	0	0	0	0	0	0	0	16	0	3	0
13	DF	(Malaysia) Mohd Dzulazlan Ibrahim	0(3)	0	0	0	0	0	0	0	0	0	0(2)	0	0	0
14	FW	(Malaysia) Akmal Rizal Ahmad Rakhli	0(7)	0	1(1)	1	0	0	0	0	0	0	1(7)	1	1	0
15	MF	(Malaysia) Junior Eldstal	14(1)	1	2	0	0	0	0	0	0	0	14(1)	1	6	1
16	MF	(Malaysia) Mohd Shahrol Saperi	4(1)	0	0	0	0	0	0	0	0	0	2	0	0	0
17	DF	(Malaysia) Mohd Hairol Mokhtar	11(3)	0	4	0	0	0	0	0	0	0	12(3)	0	1	0
18	GK	(Malaysia) Aidil Mohammad	0	0	0	0	0	0	0	0	0	0	0	0	0	0
19	MF	(Malaysia) Joseph Kalang Tie	13(2)	2	3	1	0	0	0	0	0	0	14(2)	2	3	0
20	FW	(Iran) Alireza Abbasfard	2(2)	0	2(2)	1	0	0	0	0	0	0	4(4)	1	0	0
21	MF	(Malaysia) Azizan Saperi	0(1)	0	0	0	0	0	0	0	0	0	0(1)	0	0	0
22	GK	(Malaysia) Sani Anuar Kamsani	10	0	3	0	0	0	0	0	0	0	13	0	1	1
23	MF	(Malaysia) S. Chanturu	11	6	0(1)	0	0	0	0	0	0	0	8(1)	5	1	0
24	MF	(Malaysia) Dalglish Papin Test	0	0	0	0	0	0	0	0	0	0	0	0	0	0
25	DF	(Malaysia) Mohd Dzulfadli Awang Marajeh	0	0	0	0	0	0	0	0	0	0	0	0	0	0
26	DF	(Hungary) Gábor Gyepes	13	2	3	1	0	0	0	0	0	0	15	3	5	0
29	FW	(Australia) Ryan Griffiths	8	3	0	0	0	0	0	0	0	0	5	1	0	0
30	FW	(Lebanon) Hassan Mohamad	5(1)	0	0	0	0	0	0	0	0	0	3(1)	0	0	0

== 2014 First team squad ==
=== First team squad ===
As of 1 May 2014.

- Sarawak FA most appearance players 4-1-3-2

Note: Flags indicate national team as defined under FIFA eligibility rules; some limited exceptions apply. Players may hold more than one non-FIFA nationality.

No.	Pos.	Nation	Player
1	GK	(Malaysia) MAS	Mohd Fadzley Rahim
2	DF	(Malaysia) MAS	Ronny Harun
3	DF	(Malaysia) MAS	Mazwandi Zekeria
4	DF	(Malaysia) MAS	Mafry Balang
6	MF	(Malaysia) MAS	Lot Abu Hassan
7	FW	(Malaysia) MAS	Zamri Morshidi
8	MF	(Malaysia) MAS	Reeshafiq Alwi
9	MF	(Malaysia) MAS	Mohd Rasyid Aya
10	FW	(Bosnia and Herzegovina) BIH	Muamer Salibašić
11	MF	(Malaysia) MAS	Ashri Chuchu
12	DF	(Malaysia) MAS	Ramesh Lai Ban Huat
13	DF	(Malaysia) MAS	Mohd Dzulazlan Ibrahim
14	FW	(Malaysia) MAS	Akmal Rizal Ahmad Rakhli

No.	Pos.	Nation	Player
15	MF	(Malaysia) MAS	Junior Eldstål
16	MF	(Malaysia) MAS	Mohd Shahrol Saperi
17	DF	(Malaysia) MAS	Mohd Hairol Mokhtar
18	GK	(Malaysia) MAS	Aidil Mohammad
19	MF	(Malaysia) MAS	Joseph Kalang Tie (captain)
21	MF	(Malaysia) MAS	Azizan Saperi
22	GK	(Malaysia) MAS	Sani Anuar Kamsani
23	MF	(Malaysia) MAS	S. Chanturu
24	MF	(Malaysia) MAS	Dalglish Papin Test
25	DF	(Malaysia) MAS	Mohd Dzulfadli Awang Marajeh
26	DF	(Hungary) HUN	Gábor Gyepes
29	FW	(Australia) AUS	Ryan Griffiths
30	FW	(Lebanon) LBN	Hassan Mohamad

== Goalscoring statistics ==
=== Goalscorers ===
Pos	Player	Malaysia Super League	Malaysia FA Cup	Malaysia Cup	Total
1	(Malaysia) S. Chanturu	6	0	0	6
2	(Serbia) Milorad Janjus	3	0	0	3
3	(Malaysia) Mohd Rasyid Aya	3	0	0	3
4	(Australia) Ryan Griffiths	3	0	0	3
5	(Hungary) Gábor Gyepes	2	1	0	3
6	(Malaysia) Joseph Kalang Tie	2	1	0	3
7	(Malaysia) Junior Eldstål	1	0	0	1
8	(Bosnia and Herzegovina) Muamer Salibašić	1	0	0	1
9	(Iran) Alireza Abbasfard	0	1	0	1
10	(Malaysia) Zamri Morshidi	0	1	0	1
11	(Malaysia) Akmal Rizal Ahmad Rakhli	0	1	0	1

=== Own goals ===
Rank	Player	For	Own Goal
1	(Malaysia) Ronny Harun	Pahang	1
1	(Malaysia) Junior Eldstål	Terengganu	1
1	(Malaysia) Mafry Balang	PKNS	1

== Transfer 2014 ==
For recent transfers, see List of Malaysian football transfers 2014..

=== In ===
Note: Flags indicate national team as defined under FIFA eligibility rules; some limited exceptions apply. Players may hold more than one non-FIFA nationality.

No.	Pos.	Nation	Player
14	FW	(Malaysia) MAS	Akmal Rizal Ahmad Rakhli (from Kedah FA)
9	MF	(Malaysia) MAS	Mohd Rasyid Aya (from JDT II)
1	GK	(Malaysia) MAS	Fadzley Rahim (from DRB-Hicom FC)
6	MF	(Malaysia) MAS	Lot Abu Hassan (from PKNS FC)
23	MF	(Malaysia) MAS	S. Chanturu (from Perak FA)
8	MF	(Malaysia) MAS	Reeshafiq Alwi (from PKNS FC)
7	MF	(Malaysia) MAS	Zamri Morshidi (from PKNS FC)
20	FW	(Iran) IRN	Alireza Abbasfard (from Rah Ahan F.C.)
26	DF	(Hungary) HUN	Gábor Gyepes (from Videoton FC)
5	MF	(Serbia) SRB	Milorad Janjuš (from SHB Da Nang FC)
29	MF	(Australia) AUS	Ryan Griffiths (from Adelaide United)
30	FW	(Lebanon) LBN	Hassan Mohamad (from BEC Tero Sasana F.C.)

=== Out ===
Note: Flags indicate national team as defined under FIFA eligibility rules; some limited exceptions apply. Players may hold more than one non-FIFA nationality.

No.	Pos.	Nation	Player
1	GK	(Malaysia) MAS	Saiful Amar Sudar (to Kedah FA)
8	MF	(Malaysia) MAS	Mohd Azizan Baba (to Penang FA)
7	MF	(Cameroon) CMR	Guy Bwele (to SPA FC)
6	DF	(Malaysia) MAS	Mohd Fareez Tukijo (to UiTM FC)
5	DF	(Malaysia) MAS	Shahran Abdul Samad (released)
20	FW	(Malaysia) MAS	Ahmad Aminuddin Shaharudin (to Malacca United F.C.)
14	FW	(Malaysia) MAS	Shahrul Malek (released)
9	FW	(Malaysia) MAS	Bobby Gonzales (to PDRM FA)
5	MF	(Serbia) SRB	Milorad Janjuš (released)
20	FW	(Iran) IRN	Alireza Abbasfard (released)
