= Saperi =

Saperi is a Malaysian surname. Notable people with the name include:

- Azizan Saperi (born 1989), Malaysian footballer
- Shahrol Saperi (born 1984), Malaysian footballer
