= Vivaldo =

Vivaldo is both a surname and a given name. Notable people with the name include:

- Vivaldo Belcazer (flourished 1279–1308), Italian translator
- Danilo Vivaldo (born 1987), Brazilian footballer
- Jorge Vivaldo (born 1967), Argentine footballer and manager
- Vivaldo Eduardo (born 1966), Angolan handball coach
- Vivaldo Frota (1928–2015), Argentine politician, lawyer, and academic
