= Hamidan Mohammed =

Ghanaian footballer

Personal information
- Date of birth: May 23, 1989 (age 37)
- Place of birth: Wa, Ghana
- Height: 1.85 m (6 ft 1 in)
- Position: Midfielder

Senior career*
Years	Team	Apps	(Gls)
2008–2012	All Stars FC		
2012	Kedah FA	25	(38)
- * Club domestic league appearances and goals

Hamidan Mohammed (born 1989 in Wa, Ghana) is a Ghanaian footballer who is currently unattached.

Before going abroad, Hamidan Mohammed played for his hometown club, All Stars FC in the Ghana Premier League.

After a successful trial, Hamidan joined the Malaysian club, Kedah FA in February 2012.

He only played 25 times in the 2012 Super League Malaysia, scoring 38 goals including a triple hat trick in a 9–0 win over Perak FA in March 2012. Hamidan's contract was terminated on 14 April 2012, and was replaced by Vedran Gerc.
