= Rizal Fahmi Rosid =

Malaysian footballer

Personal information
- Full name: Mohd Rizal Fahmi bin Ab Rosid
- Date of birth: 1 May 1986 (age 40)
- Place of birth: Tumpat, Kelantan, Malaysia
- Height: 1.76 m (5 ft 9 in)
- Position: Centre-back

Youth career
- 2003–2005: Kelantan

Senior career*
Years	Team	Apps	(Gls)
2006–2012	Kelantan	115	(8)
2013–2017	Selangor	46	(3)
2018	Negeri Sembilan	5	(0)
2019	Selangor United		
2020–2022	Immigration		
2022	Grab Holding Inc.		

International career^{‡}
2011	Malaysia	2	(0)
- * Club domestic league appearances and goals as of 24 March 2020 ‡ National team caps and goals as of 20 February 2017

Mohd Rizal Fahmi bin Ab Rosid (born 1 May 1986) is a Malaysian professional footballer who plays as a centre-back.

Rizal began his footballing career with the Kelantan youth team in 2003. In 2006 he made his debut for the senior team, going on to make 115 appearances over a six-year period.

== Club career ==
=== Kelantan ===
On 23 May 2012, he scored a stunning free kick goal in a 3–2 over Terengganu in 2012 AFC Cup knockout stage. With that victory Kelantan progressed to the quarter-finals where they played Arbil FC, losing 6–2 on aggregate.

=== Selangor ===
On 10 November 2013, Rizal moved from Kelantan to Selangor for an undisclosed fee. Over a four-year stay with the club Rizal played 46 times, scoring three goals.

== Style of play ==
Rizal Fahmi is one of Kelantan's free kick specialist. He made goals through free kick.

== Career statistics ==
=== Club ===
As of 10 July 2018

Appearances and goals by club, season and competition
Club	Season	League			National cup		League cup		Continental		Total	
Club	Season	Division	Apps	Goals	Apps	Goals	Apps	Goals	Apps	Goals	Apps	Goals
Kelantan	2009	Malaysia Super League		2				0	—			2
Kelantan	2010	Malaysia Super League		2				1	—			3
Kelantan	2011	Malaysia Super League	22	0	0	0	0	0	—		0	0
Kelantan	2012	Malaysia Super League	20	2					5	1	25	3
Kelantan	2013	Malaysia Super League	18	0	1	0	0	0	1	0	20	0
Kelantan	Total								6	1		
Selangor	2014	Malaysia Super League	12	0	2	0	6	0	3	0	23	0
Selangor	2015	Malaysia Super League	14	2	1	0	3	0	—		18	2
Selangor	2016	Malaysia Super League	8	0	0	0	8	0	2	0	18	0
Selangor	2017	Malaysia Super League	12	1	1	0	3	0	—		16	1
Selangor	Total		46	3	3	1	20	0	5	0	75	3
Negeri Sembilan	2018	Malaysia Super League	5	0	1	0	0	0	0	0	6	0
Career total												

== Honours ==
- Kelantan
  - Malaysia Cup: 2010, 2012
  - Sultan Haji Ahmad Shah Cup (Charity Shield Malaysia): 2011
  - Malaysia Super League: 2011, 2012
  - FA Cup: 2012, 2013
- Selangor
  - Malaysia Cup: 2015
