= Danilo Vivaldo =

Brazilian footballer (born 1987)

Personal information
- Full name: Danilo Rafael dos Santos Vivaldo
- Date of birth: 12 January 1987 (age 39)
- Place of birth: São Paulo, Brazil
- Height: 1.90 m (6 ft 3 in)
- Position: Defender

Senior career*
Years	Team	Apps	(Gls)
2005–2007	Portuguesa (Santos)		
2007–2010	Londrina		
2010–2011	Brothers Union		
2012	Kedah FA	1	(0)
- * Club domestic league appearances and goals

Danilo Rafael dos Santos Vivaldo (born 12 January 1987), simply known as Danilo Vivaldo, is a Brazilian footballer who plays as a defender. He is currently unattached.

Formerly, he played for Kedah FA in the Malaysia Super League for the 2012 season. His contract was terminated, along with another Kedah import player Daniel Baroni after only five games into the season. In that period, Danilo himself only played one game for Kedah before suffering an injury in training.

Danilo also have played for semi-professional clubs, Associação Atlética Portuguesa (Santos) and Londrina Esporte Clube between 2005 and 2010. He also had a short stint with the Bangladesh team, Brothers Union.
