= Michal Kubala =

Slovak footballer (born 1980)

Personal information
- Full name: Michal Kubala
- Date of birth: 12 June 1980 (age 46)
- Place of birth: Levice, Slovakia
- Height: 1.84 m (6 ft 0 in)
- Position: Midfielder

Team information
- Current team: TJ Družstevník Veľké Ludince

Youth career
- Slovan Levice
- Vinohrady Bratislava

Senior career*
Years	Team	Apps	(Gls)
1999–2003	Artmedia Petržalka	90	(9)
2003	MSK Rimavska Sobota	16	(2)
2003–2005	FK AS Trencin	86	(8)
2006	Artmedia Bratislava	14	(1)
2006–2007	SK Slovan Bratislava	48	(5)
2008–2009	Ljungskile SK	12	(3)
2009–2011	CS Gaz Metan Medias	60	(4)
2011–2012	FC Astra Giurgiu	1	(0)
2012–2013	Perak FA	28	(14)
2013	Selangor FA	5	(1)
2014–2015	Stavanger IF		
2015–	TJ Družstevník Veľké Ludince		

International career^{‡}
1998	Slovakia U18	7	(0)
2001	Slovakia U21	5	(0)
- * Club domestic league appearances and goals as of 20 April 2018 ‡ National team caps and goals as of 30 December 2013

Michal Kubala (born 12 June 1980) is a Slovakia footballer who plays as a midfielder for TJ Družstevník Veľké Ludince in the Slovak 3. Liga.

In 2012, he played for Perak FA in the 2012 Malaysia Super League season and was the team's top scorer of the season, securing 13 goals in the league. He was known in the league as a dead-ball specialist, and was Perak's main free-kick, corner kick and penalty kick taker. His contract was not renewed by Perak at the end of the 2012 season.

Kubala was a member of the Slovakia youth teams, appearing for the Slovakia U18 and Slovakia U21 teams. During his time in Malaysia, he also appeared in the Malaysia Selection, a team composed of Malaysia under-21 players and a selection of Malaysia league players, for the 2012 Java Cup invitational tournament in Indonesia. He scored a goal as Malaysia Selection beat Indonesia Selection 6–0.
