= Baiano (footballer, born 1981) =

Brazilian footballer

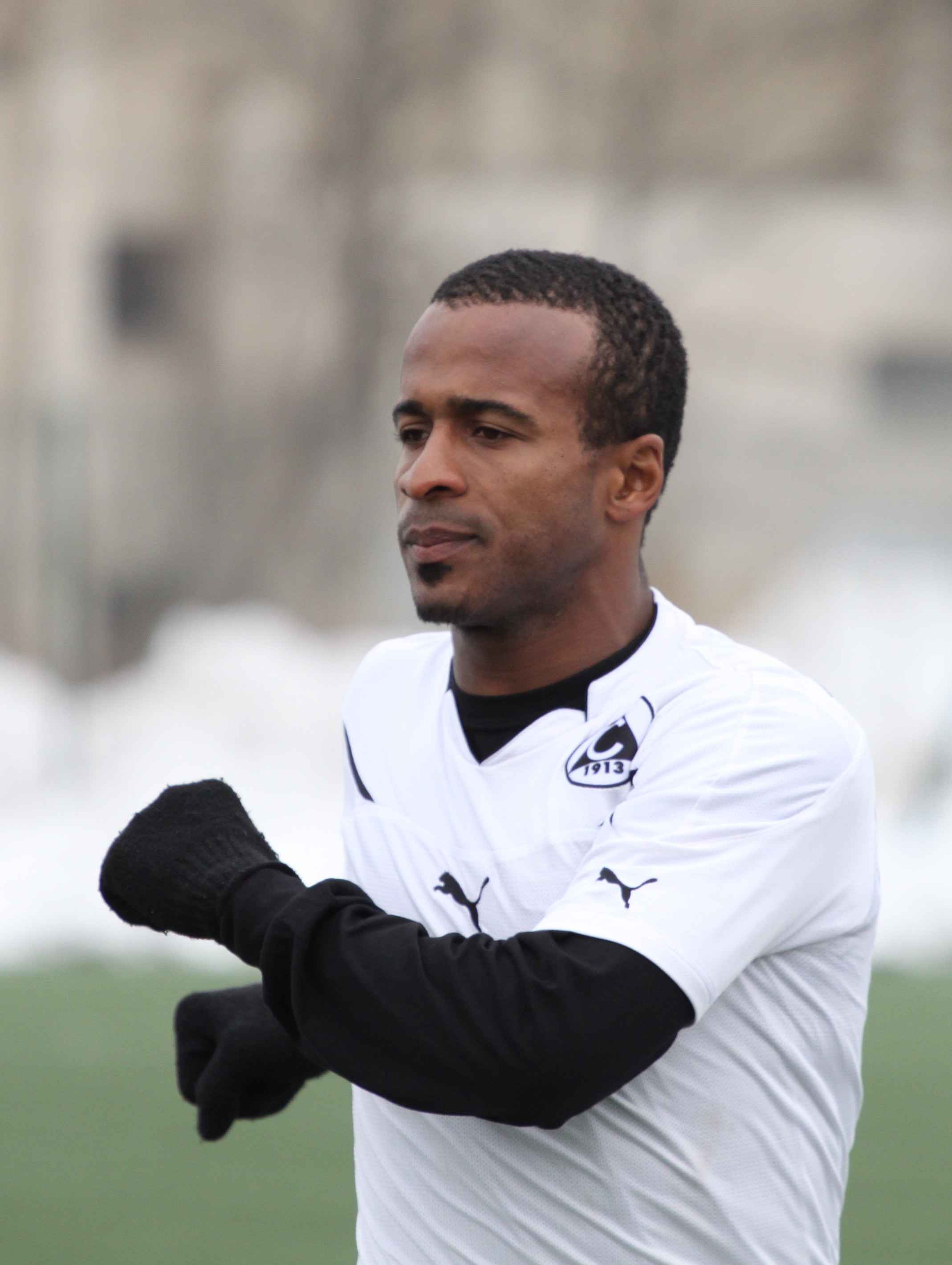

Personal information
- Full name: Erison Da Silva Santos Carnietto
- Date of birth: 19 January 1981 (age 45)
- Place of birth: Feira de Santana, Brazil
- Height: 1.78 m (5 ft 10 in)
- Position: Midfielder

Senior career*
| Years | Team | Apps | (Gls) |
| 2000 | São Bento | | |
| 2000 | Portuguesa Londrinense | | |
| 2001–2003 | Guerreros Acapulco | | |
| 2004 | Cruz Azul | 0 | (0) |
| 2005–2006 | Portuguesa Londrinense | | |
| 2007 | Ararat Yerevan | 2 | (0) |
| 2008–2010 | Universitatea Cluj | 20 | (0) |
| 2009 | → Bihor Oradea (loan) | 15 | (0) |
| 2010 | Pandurii Târgu Jiu | 0 | (0) |
| 2010 | Politehnica Iaşi | 8 | (0) |
| 2011 | Slavia Sofia | 10 | (0) |
| 2012 | Terengganu FA | | |
- * Club domestic league appearances and goals ‡ National team caps and goals as of June 05, 2012

Erison Da Silva Santos Carnietto , known as Baiano, (born January 19, 1981) is a Brazilian former footballer who played as a midfielder. He is a defensive midfielder and right defender.

Baiano previously played for Slavia Sofia in Bulgaria.

== Career ==
In 2000 as a professional player has disputed the Championship Paulista by São Bento and on the following year after a brief return to Portuguesa Londrinense Baiano was transferred to Mexico to Guerreros Acapulco with mild stroke in Cruz Azul.

In the period 2005 to 2006 he returned to play in Brazilian fields Portuguesa Londrinense. In 2007 Baiano back outside to play with FC Ararat first division team in Armenia (Asia). On the next year was his first experience in European football he debut in U Cluj.

In season 2008–09, Baiano disputed the second Romanian league with the FC Bihor team and in the second half of 2009 he returned to Universitatea Cluj, time witch disputed the second division Romanian in 2009/2010 season and now returns to the first division to play in 2010–11 season.

In July 2010, Baiano signed a contract with CS Pandurii Târgu Jiu, but after a few months he was sold to Liga II club Politehnica Iasi in September 2010.

In January 2011, after playing three years in Romania, Baiano signed with Bulgarian A PFG club Slavia Sofia. In 2012, he joined the Malaysian club, Terengganu FA for the 2012 Malaysia Super League season.
