= Chanthuru Suppiah =

Malaysian footballer

S. Chanthuru
Personal information
- Full name: Chanthuru a/l Suppiah
- Date of birth: 14 December 1987 (age 38)
- Place of birth: Kulim, Malaysia
- Height: 1.68 m (5 ft 6 in)
- Position: Winger

Team information
- Current team: Harini FT
- Number: 21

Youth career
- 2007: Telekom Malaysia
- 2008: Kuala Lumpur

Senior career*
Years	Team	Apps	(Gls)
2009	Penang	6	(1)
2010–2012	Kelantan	46	(10)
2013	Perak	3	(0)
2013–2014	Sarawak	21	(6)
2015–2018	Johor Darul Ta'zim	31	(3)
2018	→ Melaka United (loan)	15	(0)
2019	Felda united	19	(2)
2020–2022	Sarawak United	34	(1)
2023–	Harini FT	0	(0)

International career^{‡}
2010	Malaysia U-23	3	(2)
2010–2016	Malaysia	13	(1)
- * Club domestic league appearances and goals as of 26 March 2023 ‡ National team caps and goals as of 17 November 2016

Chanturu a/l Suppiah (born 14 December 1987) is a Malaysian professional footballer who plays as a right winger for second division Malaysia M3 League club Harini FT.

== Club career ==
=== Early career ===
Chanturu was born in Kulim, Kedah but he never played for his hometown team Kedah as a professional footballer. He started his career in football with Telekom Malaysia President Cup at the age of 19 in 2007. In 2008, he joined Kuala Lumpur President's Cup team.

=== Kelantan ===
Chanturu signed a contract with Penang in 2009. His performance during a league match against Kelantan has attracted Kelantan's coach that time, B. Sathianathan. For 2010 season, he officially signed a contract with Kelantan. He has won the 2010 Malaysia Cup, the 2011 Malaysia Super League title, the 2012 Malaysia Super League title, the 2012 Malaysia FA Cup and the 2012 Malaysia Cup while playing for Kelantan. During his stay with Kelantan, he was also affectionately nicknamed the "Kelantan Express" or "Turbo Chan" by Kelantan's fans for his superb speed on the field.

=== Perak ===
In 2013, Chanturu signed a contract with Perak.

=== Sarawak ===
Not long after joining Perak, he joined Sarawak FA in the same year.

=== Johor Darul Ta'zim ===
In 2015 he joined JDT FC.

=== Melaka United (loan) ===
On 21 November 2017, Chanturu agreed to join Melaka United on a season-long loan move from JDT FC. He made his debut for Melaka United in a 2–1 win over Kelantan on 3 February 2018.

=== Felda United ===
After 4 years with JDT FC, he signed for Felda United in 2019.

=== Sarawak United ===
In 2020 he return to Sarawak by signing Sarawak United, a rebrand of Sarawak FA.

=== Harini FT ===
In 2023 he joined semi-pro club Harini FT.

== International career ==
=== Malaysia Under-23 ===
Chanturu was the member of Malaysia U-23 since 2010. He has made several appearances and scored goal for the team.

=== Malaysia ===
In year 2010, Chanturu made his debut for Malaysia national team. In June 2012, he was called up by Malaysia coach, Datuk K. Rajagobal for friendly matches against Philippines and Singapore.

== Career statistics ==
=== Club ===
As of match played 27 August 2021

Appearances and goals by club, season and competition
Club	Season	League			Cup		League Cup		Continental		Total	
Club	Season	Division	Apps	Goals	Apps	Goals	Apps	Goals	Apps	Goals	Apps	Goals
Penang	2009	Malaysia Super League							–	–		
Penang	Total		0	0	0	0	0	0	–	–	0	0
Kelantan	2010	Malaysia Super League	10	1					–	–		
Kelantan	2011	Malaysia Super League	20	6					–	–		
Kelantan	2012	Malaysia Super League	16	3	6	0	0	0	6	0	28	3
Kelantan	Total		46	10	0	0	0	0	6	0	0	0
Perak	2013	Malaysia Super League	3	0					–	–		
Perak	Total		3	0	0	0	0	0	–	–	0	0
Sarawak	2014	Malaysia Super League	21	6	6	2			–	–	27	8
Sarawak	Total		21	6	0	0	0	0	–	–	0	0
Johor Darul Ta'zim	2015	Malaysia Super League	16	1	1	0	8	2	8	2	31	5
Johor Darul Ta'zim	2016	Malaysia Super League	13	2	0	0	0	0	6	0	0	0
Johor Darul Ta'zim	2017	Malaysia Super League	2	0	0	0	2	0	6	0	10	0
Johor Darul Ta'zim	Total		31	3	0	0	0	0	20	2	0	0
Melaka United (loan)	2018	Malaysia Super League	15	0	3	0	0	0	–	–	18	0
Melaka United (loan)	Total		15	0	3	0	0	0	–	–	18	0
Felda United	2019	Malaysia Super League	19	2	6	2	2	1	–	–	27	5
Felda United	Total		19	2	6	2	2	1	–	–	27	5
Sarawak United	2020	Malaysia Premier League	11	0	0	0	0	0	–	–	11	0
Sarawak United	2021	Malaysia Premier League	12	1	0	0	0	0	–	–	12	1
Sarawak United	Total		23	1	0	0	0	0	–	–	23	1
Career Total			0	0	0	0	0	0	26	2	0	0

=== International ===
As of 5 July 2018

Appearances and goals by national team and year
National team	Year	Apps	Goals
Malaysia	2010	1	0
Malaysia	2011	3	0
Malaysia	2012	2	0
Malaysia	2014	1	0
Malaysia	2015	1	0
Malaysia	2016	5	1
Total		13	1

==== International goals ====
As of match played 6 June 2016. Malaysia score listed first, score column indicates score after each S.Chanturu goal.

International goals by date, venue, cap, opponent, score, result and competition
No.	Date	Venue	Opponent	Score	Result	Competition
1	6 June 2016	Tan Sri Dato Haji Hassan Yunos Stadium, Larkin, Malaysia	Timor-Leste	3–0	3–0	2019 AFC Asian Cup qualification

== Honours ==
=== Club ===
Kelantan

- Malaysia Cup: 2010, 2012
- Malaysia Super League: 2011, 2012
- Malaysia Charity Shield: 2011
- Malaysia FA Cup: 2012

Johor Darul Ta'zim

- Malaysia Super League: 2015, 2016, 2017
- Malaysia Charity Shield: 2015, 2016
- Malaysia FA Cup: 2016
- Malaysia Cup: 2017
- AFC Cup: 2015
