= Vedran Muratović =

Croatian footballer

Personal information
- Full name: Vedran Muratović
- Date of birth: 4 October 1983 (age 43)
- Place of birth: Zagreb, SR Croatia, SFR Yugoslavia
- Height: 1.81 m (5 ft 11 in)
- Positions: Attacking midfielder; striker

Youth career
- 1993–2003: Dinamo Zagreb

Senior career*
Years	Team	Apps	(Gls)
2003–2004	Kamen Ingrad		
2004–2005	Slaven Belupo	0	(0)
2005–2006	Vihren Sandanski	1	(0)
2006–2007	OFI	0	(0)
2007–2008	Entente SSG	9	(2)
2008–2011	Čelik Zenica	5	(0)
2012	Sarawak	5	(3)
2013	Surabaya United		
2014–2015	SV Güssing	14	(11)
2015-2016	HAŠK		
2016	Bregalnica Štip	9	(1)
- * Club domestic league appearances and goals as of 1 February 2017

Vedran Muratović (born 4 October 1983, in Zagreb) is a Croatian footballer who last played for Bregalnica Štip in the Macedonian Second League.

== Career ==
He formerly played for Sarawak FA in the 2012 Malaysia Super League. He scored 7 goals in 10 games for Sarawak. In November 2012 Vedran signed a one-year contract for the Indonesian club Persebaya DU/Bhayangkara F.C., but 2 months later the contract was terminated because of the player's mother's loss.

He had a spell at Austrian lower league side SV Güssing in 2014/15.
