= Mohd Aslam Haja Najmudeen =

Malaysian footballer

Aslam Najmudeen
Personal information
- Full name: Mohd Aslam Bin Haja Najmudeen
- Date of birth: 12 March 1983 (age 43)
- Place of birth: Klang, Malaysia
- Height: 1.69 m (5 ft 6 1/2 in)
- Position: Defender

Senior career*
Years	Team	Apps	(Gls)
2011–	PKNS FC		
2012	Kuala Lumpur FA	10	(0)
2012	→ Kelantan FA (loan)	5	(0)
2013–2015	SPA FC	17	(0)
- * Club domestic league appearances and goals

Mohd Aslam Bin Haja Najmudeen (born 12 March 1983) is a Malaysian footballer who plays as defender.

== Club career ==
Aslam has played for PKNS and helped his club win the Malaysia Premier League title in 2011. Then, he left the club and joined Kuala Lumpur which competing in the 2012 Malaysia Super League. He was selected as the captain for his team but the team was relegated from Malaysia Super League after finishing the season in the last place of the 14-team league table.

In 2012, Aslam made his AFC debut in AFC Cup quarter-finals for Kelantan but his team was hammered 5–1 by Arbil SC.

For 2013 Malaysia Super League season, he decided to sign a one-year contract with PBDKT T-Team FC.
