= Fernando Abreu =

Brazilian/Portuguese footballer (born 1984)

Personal information
- Full name: Fernando Augusto de Abreu Ferreira
- Date of birth: 3 October 1984 (age 42)
- Place of birth: São Paulo, Brazil
- Height: 1.86 m (6 ft 1 in)
- Position: Centre back

Youth career
- 1996: São Bernardo
- 1996–2001: São Paulo
- 2001–2002: Porto
- 2002–2003: Torino

Senior career*
Years	Team	Apps	(Gls)
2003–2007	Racing B	71	(4)
2007	Racing Santander	1	(0)
2007–2009	Atlético Madrid B	32	(2)
2009–2010	Olimpija	9	(0)
2010–2011	Olympiakos Nicosia	10	(1)
2011–2012	IFK Mariehamn	11	(0)
2012	Johor F.C.	7	(2)
2013	Ekranas	5	(0)
2014–2015	Chiangrai United	46	(3)
2016	Lampang	0	(0)
- * Club domestic league appearances and goals as of 26 June 2016

Fernando Augusto de Abreu Ferreira (Brazilian Portuguese: [feʁˈnɐ̃du aˈbɾɛw]; born 3 October 1984), known as Abreu, is a Brazilian former professional footballer who played as a central defender.

He also holds Portuguese citizenship.

== Football career ==
Born in São Paulo, Abreu played youth football for four clubs, two of them abroad and the last being Torino FC. In 2003, aged not yet 19, he moved to Spain and signed for Racing de Santander, being registered with the B-side for the vast majority of his four-year spell; on 17 June 2007, the final day of the season, he played his only La Liga game, which consisted of five minutes in a 0–2 home loss against Real Betis.

For the 2007–08 campaign, Abreu joined another reserve team in the country and the third division, Atlético Madrid B. In the 2009 summer he signed with NK Olimpija Ljubljana in the Slovenian PrvaLiga, moving in quick succession to Olympiakos Nicosia (Cyprus) and IFK Mariehamn (Finland's Veikkausliiga).

On 7 January 2012, Abreu changed clubs and countries again, reuniting with countryman and former Santander teammate Arthuro at Malaysia's Johor Darul Takzim FC.
