= Zachariah Simukonda =

Zambian footballer (born 1983)

Personal information
- Full name: Zacharian Simukonda
- Date of birth: 27 June 1983 (age 43)
- Place of birth: Lusaka, Zambia
- Position: Striker

Senior career*
Years	Team	Apps	(Gls)
2001–2003	Red Arrows F.C.		(17)
2004	Al-Merreikh		
2005–2007	Perlis FA		
2007–2009	Al-Jaish Damascus		
2009–2010	Al-Faisaly (Amman)		(19)
2010–2011	Red Arrows F.C.		
2012	PBDKT T-Team FC	5	(1)

International career
2004–2006	Zambia	2	(0)
- * Club domestic league appearances and goals

Zachariah Simukonda (born 27 June 1983) is a Zambian former football striker.

== Playing career ==
In December 2011, Zachariah signed for the Malaysian team PBDKT T-Team FC in a 1-year contract alongside Bosnian international, Bojan Petrić. However, Zachariah picked up a long-term injury during a league match and T-Team had to terminate his contract. Before his injury, Zachariah played 5 league games, scoring one goal.

Zachariah previously played for Red Arrows FC in 2010 and also played with Perlis FA in Malaysia in 2005/07.

== Honours ==
=== Individual ===
- Zambia Super League Top scorer: 2002
