= Paulo Sérgio (footballer, born 1981) =

Brazilian footballer

Personal information
- Full name: Paulo Sérgio Ferreira Gomes
- Date of birth: 21 July 1981 (age 45)
- Place of birth: Cabo Frio, Brazil
- Height: 1.83 m (6 ft 0 in)
- Position: Midfielder

Team information
- Current team: FC Bern

Senior career*
Years	Team	Apps	(Gls)
2001	Vitória-ES		
2001–2004	Amares		
2004–2005	Vilaverdense	32	(6)
2005–2006	Moreirense	28	(0)
2006–2010	Académica	60	(0)
2008–2009	→ Al-Ettifaq (loan)	20	(0)
2010–2011	União Leiria	17	(0)
2012	PKNS FC	6	(1)
2012–2013	Ayia Napa	12	(0)
2013–2014	Beira-Mar	7	(0)
2014	AEK Kouklia	15	(0)
2015–2016	Muscat		
2016–2018	ENAD Polis Chrysochous		
2018–2020	FC Vevey	14	(1)
2020–	FC Bern		
- * Club domestic league appearances and goals as of 17:32, 26 January 2021 (UTC)

Paulo Sérgio Ferreira Gomes (born 21 July 1981 in Cabo Frio, Rio de Janeiro), known as Paulo Sérgio, is a Brazilian footballer who plays as a defensive midfielder for FC Bern.
