= Radzi Mohd Hussin =

Malaysian footballer

Radzi Hussin
Personal information
- Full name: Radzi Bin Mohd Hussin
- Date of birth: 12 June 1986 (age 40)
- Place of birth: Beaufort, Sabah, Malaysia
- Height: 1.65 m (5 ft 5 in)
- Position: Midfielder

Team information
- Current team: Sabah FA
- Number: 21

Senior career*
Years	Team	Apps	(Gls)
2005–2013	Sabah FA	62	(48)
2014	PKNS FC	29	(70)
2015	Perlis FA	20	(30)
	Sabah FA	0	(0)
- * Club domestic league appearances and goals as of 3 July 2014 ‡ National team caps and goals as of 3 July 2014

Radzi Bin Mohd Hussin (born 12 June 1986) is a Malaysian footballer, currently playing for Sabah FA as a midfielder.
