= Mafry Balang =

Malaysian footballer

Personal information
- Date of birth: 26 March 1984 (age 42)
- Place of birth: Sipitang, Sabah, Malaysia
- Height: 1.78 m (5 ft 10 in)
- Positions: Defender; midfielder

Team information
- Current team: Sabah
- Number: 2

Youth career
- 2002–2004: Sabah U21

Senior career*
Years	Team	Apps	(Gls)
2005–2006	Sabah	6	(0)
2006–2007	Malacca	16	(0)
2007–2012	Sabah	46	(4)
2012	→ Kelantan (loan)	10	(0)
2013–2014	Sarawak	32	(0)
2015–2017	Penang	61	(0)
2018–	Sabah	12	(1)
- * Club domestic league appearances and goals as of 13 July 2018

Mafry Balang (born on 26 March 1984 in Sipitang, Sabah) is a Malaysian footballer who plays for Sabah in Malaysia Premier League. He plays mainly as a centre back, although he can operate occasionally as a defensive midfielder.

Mafry spent most of his career with Sabah for five years. Nicknamed 'Iron Man' by Sabahawk fan supporter due to his tough-tackler, Mafry is a versatile player who can play anywhere on defence, including a more defensive minded midfield role.

== Career ==
=== Sabah ===
Mafry helped Sabah qualify to the 2010 Malaysia Super League under Manager Gary Phillips. He can plays in various position as defender, centre back and defensive midfielder. The Sabahawks fans called him "Iron Man". He is also co-captain for the Sabah.

After the meetings held by Sabah FA management, they made the final decision to release Mafry Balang with 13 other players for the 2013 Malaysian league.

=== Kelantan ===
Mafry joined Kelantan as a loan player for 2012 Malaysia Cup campaign with Afiq Azmi and Mohd Aslam Haja Najmudeen. They had helped Kelantan grab the 2012 Malaysia Cup trophy for the second times.

=== Sarawak ===
For the 2013 Malaysia Premier League, he had joined Sarawak and won the league.

=== Penang ===
After spending two seasons with Sarawak, Mafry joined Penang for the 2015 season. As of 8 June 2017, he was appointed as the captain for Penang team.

== Honours ==
Kelantan

- Malaysia Cup: 2012

Sarawak

- Malaysia Premier League: 2013

Penang

- Malaysia Premier League: Promotion 2015

Sabah

- Malaysia Premier League: 2019
