= Daniel Baroni =

Brazilian footballer (born 1980)

Personal information
- Full name: Daniel Soares Neves
- Date of birth: 3 June 1980 (age 46)
- Place of birth: Belo Horizonte, Minas Gerais, Brazil
- Height: 1.73 m (5 ft 8 in)
- Position: Midfielder

Senior career*
| Years | Team | Apps | (Gls) |
| 1996-1997 | Atlético Mineiro | | |
| 1998 | Valeriodoce | | |
| 1999 | Vila Nova | | |
| 2002 | Nacional | | |
| 2003 | Alagoano | | |
| 2006 | Jorge Wilstermann | | |
| 2006-2007 | Vardas | | |
| 2008 | América-MG | | |
| 2008-2009 | Rio Claro | | |
| 2009 | PSM Makassar | 5 | (0) |
| 2010 | Cruzeiro | | |
| 2010 | Cornellà | | |
| 2011-2012 | Kedah FA | 6 | (0) |
- * Club domestic league appearances and goals

Daniel Soares Neves (born 3 June 1980), simply known as Daniel Baroni, is a Brazilian footballer with Brazilian and Spanish dual nationality.

== Career ==
Daniel Baroni was a product of the Clube Atlético Mineiro youth academy. After failing to feature regularly the senior side, he had spells at several lower-league clubs in Brazil, including Valeriodoce Esporte Clube and Vila Nova Futebol Clube. Daniel Baroni continued to be a journeyman, playing for clubs in Vietnam, Bolivia and Greece. He signed for his seventeenth club in 2010, Spanish Tercera División side UE Cornellà.

He played as a striker for Kedah FA in the Malaysia Super League for the 2012 season. His contract was terminated .

Daniel Baroni, after finishing his career as a professional soccer player, has continued in the world of soccer, is a UEFA PRO coach, sports coordinator and methodology director, as well as CEO of the company Efficiency Futbol Academy, based in Barcelona, Spain and Santa Luzia MG.
