= Vedran Gerc =

Croatian footballer

Personal information
- Date of birth: 14 February 1986 (age 40)
- Place of birth: Rijeka, SFR Yugoslavia
- Height: 1.84 m (6 ft 0 in)
- Position: Striker

Team information
- Current team: Orijent 1919
- Number: 8

Youth career
- 2000–2004: Rijeka

Senior career*
| Years | Team | Apps | (Gls) |
| 2004–2011 | Rijeka | 31 | (6) |
| 2004–2005 | → Ljubljana (loan) | 8 | (1) |
| 2006–2008 | → Orijent (loan) | 20 | (19) |
| 2011 | Zadar | 3 | (0) |
| 2012 | Karlovac | 6 | (1) |
| 2012 | Kedah | | (6) |
| 2013 | Žalgiris | 12 | (3) |
| 2013 | Tirana | 3 | (0) |
| 2014 | Pomorac | 14 | (4) |
| 2014–2015 | Al-Hussein | 10 | (5) |
| 2015–2016 | Sohar | 20 | (14) |
| 2016 | Al-Suwaiq | 7 | (1) |
| 2017 | Muscat | 10 | (8) |
| 2017–2018 | Seeb Club | | |
| 2018 | Ankaran Hrvatini | 16 | (4) |
| 2018– | Orijent 1919 | 49 | (13) |

International career
| 2004 | Croatia U18 | 1 | (0) |
- * Club domestic league appearances and goals as of 26 July 2022

Vedran Gerc (born 14 February 1986) is a Croatian footballer who plays for Orijent 1919 in the Croatian Second Football League.

== Club career ==
=== Youth career ===
Vedran began his footballing career in 2000 with the junior teams of HNK Rijeka. He made appearances in the various juvenile tournaments for the Rijeka-based side.

=== Ljubljana ===
Soon after he was promoted to the senior side of the Rijeka-based side, he moved on a one-year loan deal to the Slovenian PrvaLiga side, FC Ljubljana. He scored one goal in eight appearances in the 2004–05 Slovenian PrvaLiga.

=== Orijent ===
After his short sting in Slovenia, he moved back to Croatia where he was sent on loan to Treća HNL side, NK Orijent. He scored 19 goals in 20 appearances in his two years for the Rijeka-based side.

=== Rijeka ===
Impressed with his display away from the club, the HNK Rijeka management decided to promote the local youngster to the senior side. He scored one goal in six appearances in the 2008–09 Croatian First Football League season which came on 22 April 2009 in a 1–0 win over HNK Šibenik.

He made his first appearance in the 2009–10 Croatian First Football League season on 26 July 2009 in a 6–0 win over NK Lokomotiva and scored his first goal of the season on 9 August 2009 in a 3–1 win over NK Zagreb. He also scored a hat-trick on 10 April 2010 in a 5–1 win over NK Međimurje, taking his goal tally to five goals in 14 appearances.

He made eleven appearances in his final season for HNK Rijeka.

=== Zadar ===
In mid-2011, he signed a short-term contract with Zadar-based NK Zadar. He made his official debut for the club on 22 July 2011 in a 1–1 draw against NK Lučko and made only three appearances for the side in the top division.

=== Karlovac ===
After a short spell with NK Zadar, he signed a short-term contract with another 1. HNL side, NK Karlovac. He made his official debut and scored his first goal for the club on 21 March 2012 in a 3–1 win over RNK Split. Gerc has scored one goal in six appearances for the club.

=== Kedah ===
He first moved out of Croatia in 2012 to Malaysia where he signed a one-year contract with Kedah-based team, Kedah FA. He scored his first goal in the Malaysia Super League which was a brace on 17 April 2012 in a 2–0 away win over Sarawak FA. He scored 6 goals in 10 appearances in the 2012 Liga Super.

=== Žalgiris ===
He moved back to Europe and more accurately to Lithuania in 2013 where he signed a short-term contract with FK Žalgiris. He made his A Lyga debut on 12 March 2013 in a 2–1 loss against FK Atlantas and scored his first goal in the competition on 21 April 2013 in a 4–2 win over FK Banga Gargždai.

=== Tirana ===
In late 2013, he moved to Albania and more accurately to the capital city Tirana where he signed a short-term contract with KF Tirana. He made his Albanian Superliga debut on 18 September 2013 in a 2–0 loss against KF Vllaznia Shkodër. A horrific injury at the end of the first half against KF Bylis Ballsh forced to the Croatian to end his spell with the Albanian side.

=== Pomorac ===
After various stints across Europe and Asia, he moved back to Croatia and more accurately to Rijeka where he signed a one-year contract with the 2. HNL side NK Pomorac 1921. He made his 2. HNL debut on 2 March 2014 in a 0–0 draw against HNK Segesta and scored his first goal in the competition on 19 March 2014 in a 2–2 draw against HNK Cibalia.

=== Al-Hussein ===
He moved to Jordan in 2014 where he signed a six-month contract with the Jordan Premier League side Al-Hussein SC. Soon after his arrival at the Irbid-based club, he scored a hat-trick on 4 April 2015 in a 3–0 win over Al-Ramtha SC. He scored ten goals in 16 appearances for the Jordanian side.

=== Sohar ===
In 2015, he moved to Oman where he signed a one-year contract with Sohar-based team, Sohar SC. He made his Oman Professional League debut and scored his first goal in the competition on 14 September 2015 in a 2–1 win over Sur SC. He also scored a hat-trick on 28 October 2015 in a 4–2 win over Muscat Club. He was adjudged the top scorer of the 2015–16 Oman Professional League scoring 14 goals in 20 appearances.

=== Al-Suwaiq ===
He was on a radar of various clubs across the Sultanate after impressing with his scoring ability in his first season in the Oman Professional League, before Al-Suwaiq Club managed to sign him on 29 November 2016. The management decided to part ways with the Croatian striker after a series of poor performances in which he could manage to score only three goals in ten appearances.

=== Muscat ===
Realizing his potential upfront, another Omani side Muscat Club announced the signing of Gerc until the end of the 2016–17 Oman Professional League season. He scored nine goals in eleven appearances for the Muscat-based club in the 2016–17 season, becoming the club top scorer.

== Club career statistics ==
| Club | Season | Division | League | | Cup | | Continental | | Other | | Total | |
| Club | Season | Division | Apps | Goals | Apps | Goals | Apps | Goals | Apps | Goals | Apps | Goals |
|---|---|---|---|---|---|---|---|---|---|---|---|---|
| Ljubljana | 2004–05 | Slovenian PrvaLiga | 8 | 1 | 0 | 0 | 0 | 0 | 0 | 0 | 8 | 1 |
| Ljubljana | Total | | 8 | 1 | 0 | 0 | 0 | 0 | 0 | 0 | 8 | 1 |
| Orijent | 2006–07 | Treća HNL | 8 | 12 | 0 | 0 | 0 | 0 | 0 | 0 | 8 | 12 |
| Orijent | 2007–08 | Treća HNL | 12 | 7 | 0 | 0 | 0 | 0 | 0 | 0 | 12 | 7 |
| Orijent | Total | | 20 | 19 | 0 | 0 | 0 | 0 | 0 | 0 | 20 | 19 |
| Rijeka | 2008–09 | 1. HNL | 6 | 1 | 0 | 0 | 0 | 0 | 0 | 0 | 6 | 1 |
| Rijeka | 2009–10 | 1. HNL | 14 | 5 | 0 | 0 | 0 | 0 | 0 | 0 | 14 | 5 |
| Rijeka | 2010–11 | 1. HNL | 11 | 0 | 2 | 0 | 0 | 0 | 0 | 0 | 13 | 0 |
| Rijeka | Total | | 31 | 6 | 2 | 0 | 0 | 0 | 0 | 0 | 31 | 6 |
| Zadar | 2011 | 1. HNL | 3 | 0 | 0 | 0 | 0 | 0 | 0 | 0 | 3 | 0 |
| Zadar | Total | | 3 | 0 | 0 | 0 | 0 | 0 | 0 | 0 | 3 | 0 |
| Karlovac | 2012 | 1. HNL | 6 | 1 | 0 | 0 | 0 | 0 | 0 | 0 | 6 | 1 |
| Karlovac | Total | | 6 | 1 | 0 | 0 | 0 | 0 | 0 | 0 | 6 | 1 |
| Kedah FA | 2012 | Malaysia Super League | 10 | 6 | 0 | 0 | 0 | 0 | 0 | 0 | 10 | 6 |
| Kedah FA | Total | | 10 | 6 | 0 | 0 | 0 | 0 | 0 | 0 | 10 | 6 |
| Žalgiris | 2013 | A Lyga | 12 | 3 | 4 | 2 | 0 | 0 | 0 | 0 | 16 | 5 |
| Žalgiris | Total | | 12 | 3 | 4 | 2 | 0 | 0 | 0 | 0 | 16 | 5 |
| Tirana | 2013 | Albanian Superliga | 3 | 0 | 0 | 0 | 0 | 0 | 0 | 0 | 3 | 0 |
| Tirana | Total | | 3 | 0 | 0 | 0 | 0 | 0 | 0 | 0 | 3 | 0 |
| Pomorac | 2014 | 2. HNL | 14 | 4 | 0 | 0 | 0 | 0 | 0 | 0 | 14 | 4 |
| Pomorac | Total | | 14 | 4 | 0 | 0 | 0 | 0 | 0 | 0 | 14 | 4 |
| Al-Hussein | 2014-15 | Jordan Premier League | 10 | 5 | 6 | 5 | 0 | 0 | 0 | 0 | 16 | 10 |
| Al-Hussein | Total | | 10 | 5 | 6 | 5 | 0 | 0 | 0 | 0 | 16 | 10 |
| Sohar | 2015-16 | Oman Professional League | 20 | 14 | 9 | 7 | 0 | 0 | 0 | 0 | 29 | 21 |
| Sohar | Total | | 20 | 14 | 9 | 7 | 0 | 0 | 0 | 0 | 29 | 21 |
| Al-Suwaiq | 2016 | Oman Professional League | 7 | 1 | 3 | 2 | 0 | 0 | 0 | 0 | 10 | 3 |
| Al-Suwaiq | Total | | 7 | 1 | 3 | 2 | 0 | 0 | 0 | 0 | 10 | 3 |
| Muscat | 2017 | Oman Professional League | 10 | 8 | 1 | 1 | 0 | 0 | 0 | 0 | 11 | 9 |
| Muscat | Total | | 10 | 8 | 1 | 1 | 0 | 0 | 0 | 0 | 11 | 9 |
| Career total | | | 119 | 39 | 30 | 14 | 0 | 0 | 0 | 0 | 149 | 53 |
