= Fazliata Taib =

Malaysian footballer

Personal information
- Full name: Mohd Fazliata bin Taib
- Date of birth: 10 December 1985 (age 40)
- Place of birth: Kedah, Malaysia
- Height: 1.69 m (5 ft 7 in)
- Position: Defender

Team information
- Current team: Felcra
- Number: 14

Senior career*
Years	Team	Apps	(Gls)
2005–2014	Kedah	69	(4)
2015	Negeri Sembilan	13	(0)
2016–	Felcra	41	(0)
- * Club domestic league appearances and goals as of 13 July 2018

Mohd Fazliata bin Taib (born 10 December 1985, in Changlun, Kedah) is a Malaysian footballer who plays for Felcra in the Malaysia Premier League, primarily as a centre back but he is also capable of playing as a right full back when required.
