= Hendrik Helmke =

German footballer (born 1987)

Personal information
- Date of birth: 13 July 1987 (age 39)
- Place of birth: Winsen, West Germany
- Height: 1.81 m (5 ft 11 in)
- Position: Midfielder

Youth career
- TSV Winsen
- –2003: Lüneburger SK
- 2003–2004: Hamburger SV
- 2004–2005: SC Concordia
- 2005–2006: SC Vier

Senior career*
Years	Team	Apps	(Gls)
2006–2007	VfL Maschen		
2007–2008	Lüneburger SK		
2008–2010	VfB Lübeck	51	(0)
2011–2012	IFK Mariehamn	29	(2)
2012–2013	Sabah FA	4	(2)
2013	FF Jaro	21	(4)
2013–2014	Tromsø	9	(0)
2014	FF Jaro	31	(8)
2014–2015	Esteghlal	0	(0)
2015	Al Ahly	4	(0)
2017	FC Lahti	28	(1)
2019	KPV	23	(4)
- * Club domestic league appearances and goals

Hendrik Helmke (born 13 July 1987) is a German former professional footballer who played as a midfielder.

== Career ==
Helmke came to Malaysia in 2012 and joined Sabah FA on 16 April 2012, replacing Michael Baird. He scored his first goal for Sabah, converting a penalty in a 2–1 loss against PBDKT T-Team FC on 15 May 2012.

He scored two goals in the Malaysian Super League. The first was in 2–1 loss against PBDKT T-Team FC, the second in a 3–1 victory against Negeri Sembilan FA.

After a spell with the Finnish club Jaro, Helmke joined the Norwegian Tippeligaen side Tromsø on a free transfer in August 2013 and signed a two-and-a-half-year contract with the club. In the winter transfers of 2015, Helmke signed a contract with Esteghlal only to break the deal later for unknown reasons. Later in the same month, he signed a contract for Al Ahly for three-and-a-half years.

== Honours ==
Individual

- Veikkausliiga Player of the Month: April 2014
