= Michaël Niçoise =

Guadeloupean footballer (born 1984)

Mickaël Niçoise
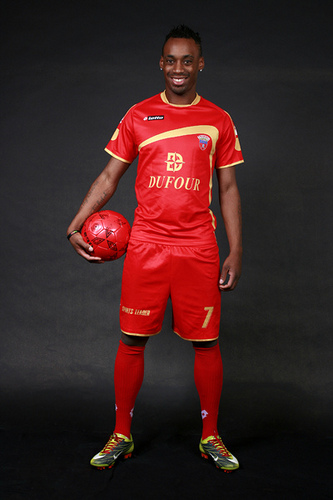
- Mickaël Niçoise

Personal information
- Full name: Mickaël Joseph Niçoise
- Date of birth: 19 September 1984 (age 42)
- Place of birth: Bondy, France
- Height: 1.83 m (6 ft 0 in)
- Position: Striker

Team information
- Current team: Meaux

Youth career
- 1991–1993: A.S.C.C Chelles
- 1993–1996: Meaux
- 1996–2000: Paris Saint-Germain
- 2000–2001: Tours
- 2001–2002: Paris Saint-Germain
- 2002–2004: Amiens

Senior career*
Years	Team	Apps	(Gls)
2004–2005	Amiens	0	(0)
2005–2006	FC Brussels	26	(3)
2006–2007	Gençlerbirliği	8	(0)
2007–2008	Mouscron	25	(2)
2008–2009	Neuchâtel Xamax	25	(2)
2008–2009	Ethnikós Áchnas	8	(0)
2010–2011	R.F.C. Tournai	24	(10)
2011	SS Saint-Louisienne		
2011	Al-Masry	0	(0)
2012	PKNS F.C.	7	(6)
2013	PK-35 Vantaa	7	(0)
2013	Olympique Béja	1	(0)
2014	Putrajaya SPA	?	(?)
2015	Mosta	9	(1)
2015–2016	Maziya	?	(?)
2016–2017	Görelespor	6	(1)
2017–2018	US Ivry	5	(0)
2018–	Meaux	18	(0)

International career
2008–2010	Guadeloupe	5	(1)
- * Club domestic league appearances and goals as of 1 July 2019

Mickaël Joseph Niçoise (born 19 September 1984) is a French professional footballer who plays as a striker for French club Meaux.

== Club career ==
=== Youth ===
Born in Bondy, Seine-Saint-Denis, Niçoise began playing football at an early age with his hometown club, ASCC Chelles. He was spotted at 13 by AJ Auxerre but left the family nest at 14 to join the sports-study program at CS Meaux and the Paris Saint-Germain training center.

=== Senior ===
Niçoise began his senior career at Amiens SC training center that offered him his first professional contract in 2003. He signed his professional contract under Denis Troch. He played in a Coupe de la Ligue match against Troyes. Arrived in extra time, he qualify his team with his penalty during the session of shots in the purpose. Alex Dupont's arrival will push him then towards the exit.

In 2005, he signed with Belgian club FC Brussels. During his first experience outside France he was coached by French manager Albert Cartier. Partnering Igor de Camargo in attack, he registered 3 goals for 26 league matches.

In 2006, Elijah joined Süper Lig side Gençlerbirliği S.K.

In 2007, he returned to Belgium signing with Mouscron.

In 2008, he moved to Switzerland to play for Neuchâtel Xamax.

He spent part of the 2008–09 season with Ethnikós Áchnas but agreed the termination of his contract after six months with the Cypriot club.

In 2010, Niçoise played for Réunion side SS Saint-Louisienne.

In summer 2011, Niçoise signed a three-year contract with Egyptian club Al-Masry SC. He did not make an appearance for the club.

In early 2012, he signed with Malaysia Super League side PKNS F.C. as a free agent following a one-week trial. He was made vice-captain of PKNS. He scored 5 goals in his first 4 matches. He later injured his anterior cruciate ligament.

In 2013, he signed with Finnish second-tier club PK-35 Vantaa.

In 2015, he played for Maziya S&RC of the Maledives.

== International career ==
Niçoise made his debut for Guadeloupe team at the Caribbean Cup in December 2008 against Cuba. He scored in his second game against Haiti.

== Personal life ==
He is a Muslim, having converted to Islam. He also has two daughters.
