= Fadzli Saari =

Malaysian former footballer

Personal information
- Full name: Mohd Fadzli Saari
- Date of birth: 1 January 1983 (age 43)
- Place of birth: Pahang, Malaysia
- Height: 1.80 m (5 ft 11 in)
- Position: Striker

Team information
- Current team: Perlis Northern Lions U19 (assistant coach)

Senior career*
Years	Team	Apps	(Gls)
2001	SV Wehen	5	(0)
2002–2006	Pahang FA		
2006–2008	Selangor FA		
2009–2010	KL PLUS	21	(9)
2011–2012	Selangor FA	22	(6)
2012–2013	T-Team	18	(1)
2013–2014	Sime Darby		
2014–2015	ATM FA	8	(0)
2016–2017	Felcra FC		

International career^{‡}
2001–2006	Malaysia U-23		
2002–2007	Malaysia	33	(3)

Managerial career
- 2018: Felcra FC (Assistant coach)
- 2019 –: Perlis Northern Lions U19 (Assistant coach)
Medal record
Men's football
Representing Malaysia
ASEAN Championship
Third place	2004
Malaysia U23
SEA Games
Bronze medal – third place	2005 Philippines	Football
Bronze medal – third place	2003 Vietnam	Football
Silver medal – second place	2001 Malaysia	Football
- * Club domestic league appearances and goals as of 3 January 2018 ‡ National team caps and goals as of 3 January 2018

Mohd Fadzli Saari (born 1 January 1983) is a Malaysian former footballer who is an assistant coach for Perlis Northern Lions U19 . He was a member of the Malaysia national football team.

== Career ==
Fadzli is one of the Malaysian footballers who was given a chance to play outside Malaysia. Together with another Malaysian player, Rudie Ramli he chose to play with a German club SV Wehen in 2001.

In 2004, he won the Malaysia Super League with Pahang.

With national side, he played in 2005 Islamic Solidarity Games when the national team reached quarter-final. He also was the captain at 2005 SEA Games in Bacolod, Philippines, where Malaysia won the bronze medal after defeating Indonesia Under-23 1–0 thanks to his only goal in the match.

He also represented the country in the 2007 AFC Asian Cup. He only played two matches in the tournament. In January 2009, Fadzli earned a national call up for the first time after being left out for one and a half years.

== Career statistics ==
=== International ===
As of 14 July 2007.

Appearances and goals by national team and year
National team	Year	Apps	Goals
Malaysia	2002	3	0
Malaysia	2003	7	1
Malaysia	2004	10	1
Malaysia	2005	2	0
Malaysia	2006	6	0
Malaysia	2007	5	1
Total		33	3

=== International Senior Goals ===
#	Date	Venue	Opponent	Score	Result	Competition
1.	26 September 2003	Kuala Lumpur, Malaysia	Indonesia	1–1	Draw	Friendly
2.	8 December 2004	Kuala Lumpur, Malaysia	Timor-Leste	5–0	Win	2004 AFF Championship
3.	24 March 2007	Colombo, Sri Lanka	Sri Lanka	1–4	Win	Friendly

== Honours ==
Pahang

- Division 1/ Liga Super : 2004, 2005
- Malaysia FA Cup : 2006

Selangor

- Malaysia Cup : 2008 runner up
- Charity Cup : 2011

Malaysia U-23

- SEA Games : (silver) silver 2001 ; (bronze) bronze 2003 ; 2005

Malaysia

- AFF Championship : 2004 third place
