= Arthuro =

Brazilian footballer (born 1982)

Personal information
- Full name: Arthuro Henrique Bernhardt
- Date of birth: 27 August 1982 (age 44)
- Place of birth: Florianópolis, Brazil
- Height: 1.90 m (6 ft 3 in)
- Position: Centre forward

Youth career
- Hamburger SV

Senior career*
Years	Team	Apps	(Gls)
1999–2000	Criciúma		
2000–2003	Middlesbrough	0	(0)
2003–2004	Racing B	7	(2)
2003–2004	Racing Santander	0	(0)
2004–2005	Sporting Gijón	25	(6)
2005–2008	Alavés	29	(6)
2007–2008	→ Córdoba (loan)	34	(10)
2008	Steaua București	9	(1)
2009	Terek Grozny	0	(0)
2009	Flamengo	0	(0)
2009	Celta	11	(0)
2009	Al Dhafra	9	(2)
2010	União Leiria	0	(0)
2011	Avaí	6	(1)
2012	Johor F.C.	5	(7)
2013	Pelotas	8	(0)
2013–2014	União Madeira	20	(12)
2014–2015	Estoril	14	(0)
2015–2016	Recreativo	17	(6)
2017	Titus Pétange	8	(1)
2017–2018	Sabadell	6	(1)
Total		208	(55)
- * Club domestic league appearances and goals as of 31 January 2018

Arthuro Henrique Bernhardt (born 27 August 1982), known simply as Arthuro, is a Brazilian former professional footballer who played as a centre forward.

He also held an Italian passport.

== Football career ==
Arthuro was born in Florianópolis, Santa Catarina. After a brief youth spell in Germany with Hamburger SV, he returned to his country to start his professional career, with lowly Criciúma Esporte Clube. The following year, aged just 18, he moved abroad again, spending three years without any first-team appearances for Middlesbrough.

Next stop was Spain, and Arthuro also struggled initially: he only appeared seven times with Racing de Santander's reserves in the third division but fared better in the following years, successively with Sporting de Gijón, Deportivo Alavés and Córdoba CF– he also appeared in six scoreless games with the Basques in 2005–06's La Liga, with relegation.

Released by Alavés in June 2008, Arthuro played in Romania with FC Steaua București until January of the following year, when he transferred to Russian club FC Terek Grozny. Again in quick succession he moved teams again, signing in May with Clube de Regatas do Flamengo.

Arthuro represented his fourth side in one year when he signed with RC Celta de Vigo, also from the Spanish second level. However, in early January 2010, both parties agreed to terminate his contract after poor performances overall (he failed to score a single official goal) and failure to adjust to the city; he immediately found a new club, joining Al Dhafra S.C.C. in the United Arab Emirates.

Late in 2010, Arthuro moved to Portugal and joined U.D. Leiria, but quickly returned to his homeland and signed for Avaí Futebol Clube. After only a couple of matches he changed teams and countries again, joining Johor Darul Takzim F.C. in Malaysia.
