= Azizan Saperi =

Malaysian footballer (born 1989)

Personal information
- Full name: Azizan Bin Saperi
- Date of birth: 11 October 1989 (age 37)
- Place of birth: Kuching, Sarawak, Malaysia
- Height: 1.63 m (5 ft 4 in)
- Position: Midfielder

Team information
- Current team: Sarawak FA
- Number: 21

Youth career
- 2009–2010: Sarawak President Team

Senior career*
Years	Team	Apps	(Gls)
2011–	Sarawak FA	21	(2)
- * Club domestic league appearances and goals as of 6 December 2013

Azizan Bin Saperi (born 11 October 1989 in Sarawak) is a Malaysian footballer currently playing for Sarawak FA in Malaysia Super League.

His brother Mohd Shahrol Saperi is also a footballer and currently his teammate in Sarawak.
