= Bojan Petrić =

Bosnian-Herzegovinian football player (born 1984)

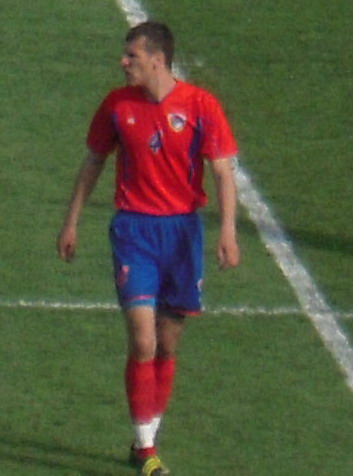

Personal information
- Full name: Bojan Petrić
- Date of birth: 29 November 1984 (age 41)
- Place of birth: Slavonski Brod, SFR Yugoslavia
- Height: 1.90 m (6 ft 3 in)
- Position: Defender

Team information
- Current team: Polet 1926

Senior career*
Years	Team	Apps	(Gls)
2002–2005	Polet Brod		
2005–2007	Rudar Ugljevik		
2007–2011	Borac Banja Luka	57	(7)
2011	Novi Pazar	1	(0)
2012–2013	T-Team	36	(1)
2013–2015	Sheikh Russel	21	(1)
2015–2016	Lovćen	14	(0)
2016–2017	Tekstilac Derventa	14	(1)
2017	Zvijezda	11	(1)
2017	OFK Grbalj		
2017–2018	İçel İdmanyurdu Spor		
2018–2019	Meskispor		
2019–	Polet Brod		
- * Club domestic league appearances and goals as of 01:41, 28 December 2019 (UTC)

Bojan Petrić (Serbian Cyrillic: Бојан Петрић; born 29 November 1984) is a Bosnian-Herzegovinian football player currently plays as a defender for Polet Brod.

== Club career ==
Bojan Petrić was born in Slavonski Brod (SR Croatia, SFR Yugoslavia) a town on Sava river on the border with SR Bosnia and Herzegovina. Still young, he moved to Bosanski Brod (name simply as Brod nowadays as part of the Republika Srpska, the Serbian entity within Bosnia), a town on the Bosnian side of the river, where he begin playing with local side FK Polet Bosanski Brod.

Already as senior, he played three seasons with Polet in the lower leagues, before moving in summer 2005 to FK Rudar Ugljevik who had just been relegated from the Premier League to the First League of the Republika Srpska, one of two Bosnian second flight leagues. He played with Rudar for two seasons, before moving in summer 2007 to FK Borac Banja Luka in the Bosnia and Herzegovina Premier League. He stayed with Borac until summer 2011, having been part of the 2010–11 championship winning squad. For the 2011 season, he joined FK Novi Pazar in the Serbian SuperLiga.

In December 2011, he signed with the Malaysian club, T-Team FC In the 2012–2013 season, he played for Sheikh Russel KC in the Bangladesh Premier League from 2013.

In February 2017, Petrić signed with NK Zvijezda Gradačac. On 20 August 2017 Petrić announced on Instagram, that he had joined Turkish club İçel İdmanyurdu Spor Külübü. In November 2018, he posted pictures playing for another Turkish club, Mersin Büyüksehir Belediyesi Meskispor.

Ahead of the 2019–20 season, he returned to Polet Brod.

== Honours ==
Sheikh Russel

- Bangladesh Premier League (football): 2012–13
- Independence Cup: 2012–13

Borac Banja Luka

- Premier League of Bosnia and Herzegovina: 2010–11
- Bosnia and Herzegovina Cup Winner: 2009–2010
- First League of the Republika Srpska: 2007–08
