= Shahrol Saperi =

Malaysian footballer (born 1984)

Personal information
- Full name: Mohammad Shahrol bin Saperi
- Date of birth: 12 October 1984 (age 42)
- Place of birth: Kuching, Malaysia
- Height: 1.63 m (5 ft 4 in)
- Position: Midfielder

Team information
- Current team: Sarawak (U-19 fitness coach)

Youth career
- 2001–2003: Sarawak U-21

Senior career*
| Years | Team | Apps | (Gls) |
| 2004–2017 | Sarawak | 66 | (4) |

Managerial career
- 2016–: Sarawak (U-19 fitness coach)
- * Club domestic league appearances and goals

Mohammad Shahrol bin Saperi (born 12 October 1984), known as Shahrol Saperi is a former Malaysian footballer who is currently the fitness coach for Sarawak FA U-19.

Shahrol played with Sarawak since 2001 when he joined their Malaysia President Cup in Sarawak President's Under-21 team and was promoted to the senior squad in 2004. He had also served as the team captain.

His younger brother Hafis Saperi is also a footballer who is currently played for Kuching FA in Malaysia M3 League.

== Honours ==
=== Club ===
Sarawak

- Malaysia Premier League

Promotion: 2011
