= 2012 AFC Cup final =

- Event: 2012 AFC Cup
Erbil	Al-Kuwait
(Iraq)	(Kuwait)
0	4
- Date: 3 November 2012
- Venue: Franso Hariri Stadium, Erbil
- Referee: Valentin Kovalenko (Uzbekistan)
- Attendance: 30,000

The 2012 AFC Cup final was a football match which was played on 3 November 2012, to determine the champion of the 2012 AFC Cup. It was the final of the 8th edition of the AFC Cup, a competition organized by the Asian Football Confederation (AFC) for clubs from "developing countries" in Asia.

The final was played between Erbil from Iraq and Al-Kuwait from Kuwait. It was the first continental final to be hosted in Iraq since the first leg of the 1989 Asian Club Championship Final. Al-Kuwait won 4–0 to win their second AFC Cup title in four years.

== Venue ==
The AFC decided that the final would be hosted by one of the finalists. On 14 June 2012, the draw for the quarter-finals, semi-finals and final was made. For the final, the winner of semi-final 2 (played between the winners of quarter-finals 3 and 4) would be the home team, while the winner of semi-final 1 (played between the winners of quarter-finals 1 and 2) would be the away team. As a result, Arbil is the home team, and Al-Kuwait is the away team.

The match was played at Arbil's home stadium, Franso Hariri Stadium, in Arbil, Iraq.

== Road to final ==
(Iraq) Arbil				Round	Al-Kuwait			
Bye				Qualifying play-off	Bye			
Opponent	Result			Group stage	Opponent	Result		
(Kuwait) Kazma	1–1 (H)			Matchday 1	(Saudi Arabia) Al-Ettifaq	1–5 (H)		
(Yemen) Al-Oruba	2–2 (A)			Matchday 2	(Maldives) VB	2–2 (A)		
(India) East Bengal	2–0 (A)			Matchday 3	(Lebanon) Al-Ahed	4–0 (A)		
(India) East Bengal	2–0 (H)			Matchday 4	(Lebanon) Al-Ahed	1–0 (H)		
(Kuwait) Kazma	2–1 (A)			Matchday 5	(Saudi Arabia) Al-Ettifaq	2–2 (A)		
(Yemen) Al-Oruba	2–1 (H)			Matchday 6	(Maldives) VB	7–1 (H)		
Group B winner: Team / Pld / W / D / L / GF / GA / GD / Pts; (Iraq) Arbil / 6 / 4 / 2 / 0 / 11 / 5 / +6 / 14; (Kuwait) Kazma / 6 / 3 / 2 / 1 / 10 / 6 / +4 / 11; (Yemen) Al-Oruba / 6 / 2 / 2 / 2 / 10 / 8 / +2 / 8; (India) East Bengal / 6 / 0 / 0 / 6 / 2 / 14 / −12 / 0				Final standings	Group C runner-up: Team / Pld / W / D / L / GF / GA / GD / Pts; (Saudi Arabia) Al-Ettifaq / 6 / 4 / 2 / 0 / 18 / 7 / +11 / 14; Al-Kuwait / 6 / 3 / 2 / 1 / 17 / 10 / +7 / 11; (Lebanon) Al-Ahed / 6 / 2 / 1 / 3 / 7 / 11 / −4 / 7; (Maldives) VB / 6 / 0 / 1 / 5 / 9 / 23 / −14 / 1			
Opponent	Agg.	1st leg	2nd leg	Knockout phase	Opponent	Agg.	1st leg	2nd leg
(Uzbekistan) Neftchi Farg'ona	4–0 (H) (one-leg match)			Round of 16	(Kuwait) Al-Qadsia	1–1 (aet) (3–1 p) (A) (one-leg match)		
(Malaysia) Kelantan	6–2	5–1 (H)	1–1 (A)	Quarterfinals	(Jordan) Al-Wehdat	3–0	0–0 (H)	3–0 (A)
(Thailand) Chonburi	8–2	4–1 (H)	4–1 (A)	Semifinals	(Saudi Arabia) Al-Ettifaq	6–1	4–1 (H)	2–0 (A)

== Match details ==
3 November 2012
17:00 UTC+03:00

Arbil (Iraq)	0–4	Al-Kuwait
	Report	Hammami 3' (pen.), 90'; Rogerinho 42'; Khamis 83'

Franso Hariri Stadium, Arbil
Attendance: 30,000
Referee: Valentin Kovalenko (Uzbekistan)

Arbil	Al-Kuwait

GK	21	(Iraq) Sarhang Mohsen (c)
DF	14	(Uganda) Ivan Bukenya
DF	30	(Iraq) Ahmad Ibrahim
MF	8	(Iraq) Salih Sadir	(substituted off) 77'
MF	9	(Iraq) Ahmed Al-Asadi	(substituted off) 46'
MF	12	(Syria) Nadim Sabagh
MF	16	(Iraq) Miran Khesro
MF	25	(Iraq) Saad Abdul-Amir
FW	7	(Iraq) Halgurd Mulla Mohammed
FW	17	(Iraq) Nabeel Sabah	(substituted off) 64'
FW	29	(Iraq) Amjad Radhi
Substitutes
GK	22	(Iraq) Jalal Hassan
DF	3	(Iraq) Hardi Tahir
DF	28	(Iraq) Hatem Zedan
FW	5	(Senegal) Papa Diop
FW	10	(Uganda) Sula Matovu	(substituted on) 46'
FW	11	(Iraq) Luay Salah	(substituted on) 64'
FW	19	(Iraq) Mustafa Karim	(substituted on) 77'
Manager
(Syria) Nizar Mahrous

GK	1	(Kuwait) Musab Al Kanderi
DF	3	(Kuwait) Fahad Awadh
DF	19	(Bahrain) Hussain Ali Baba
DF	31	(Kuwait) Sami Al Sanea
MF	13	(Tunisia) Chadi Hammami	(yellow card) 58'
MF	20	(Kuwait) Hussain Hakem (c)
MF	37	(Kuwait) Sherida Khaled
MF	7	(Kuwait) Fahad Al Enezi		(substituted off) 65'
FW	9	(Tunisia) Issam Jemâa		(substituted off) 54'
FW	10	(Brazil) Rogério	(yellow card) 69'	(substituted off) 88'
MF	15	(Kuwait) Waleed Ali
Substitutes
GK	34	(Kuwait) Abdulrahman Al Hussainan
DF	33	(Kuwait) Fahad Hamoud
MF	14	(Kuwait) Abdullah Al Dhafeeri		(substituted on) 88'
MF	17	(Kuwait) Abdullah Al Buraiki
MF	18	(Kuwait) Jarah Al Ateeqi		(substituted on) 65'
MF	30	(Kuwait) Rashed Salem
FW	40	(Kuwait) Abdulhadi Khamis		(substituted on) 54'
Manager
(Romania) Marin Ion

Assistant referees:
Rafael Ilyasov (Uzbekistan)
Mamur Saidkasimov (Uzbekistan)
Fourth official:
Vladislav Tseytlin (Uzbekistan)

Match rules

- 90 minutes.
- 30 minutes of extra time if necessary.
- Penalty shoot-out if scores still level.
- Seven named substitutes.
- Maximum of three substitutions.
