= 2012 AFC Cup knockout stage =

Football tournament in Asia

The 2012 AFC Cup knockout stage was contested by a total of 16 teams (10 from West Asia Zone and 6 from East Asia Zone). They included the 8 group winners and the 8 group runners-up from the group stage.

Each round of this single-elimination tournament was played over one or two matches. In the round of 16, each tie was played as one match, hosted by the winners of each group against the runners-up of another group. In the quarter-finals and semi-finals, each tie was played over two legs on a home-and-away basis. The final was hosted by one of the finalists, decided by draw. The away goals rule (for two-legged ties), extra time (away goals do not apply in extra time) and penalty shootout would be used to decide the winner if necessary.

The matchups for the round of 16 were decided based on the results from the group stage. After the completion of the round of 16, the draw for the quarter-finals, semi-finals, and final was held at the AFC house in Kuala Lumpur, Malaysia on 14 June 2012, 15:00 UTC+08:00. In this draw, the "country protection" rule was applied: if there are exactly two clubs from the same country, they may not face each other in the quarter-finals; however, if there are more than two clubs from the same country, they may face each other in the quarter-finals.

== Qualified teams ==
Group	Winners	Runners-up
A	(Kuwait) Al-Qadsia	(Oman) Al-Suwaiq
B	(Iraq) Arbil	(Kuwait) Kazma
C	(Saudi Arabia) Al-Ettifaq	Al-Kuwait
D	(Jordan) Al-Wehdat	(Uzbekistan) Neftchi Farg'ona
E	(Syria) Al-Shorta	(Iraq) Al-Zawra'a
F	(Hong Kong) Kitchee	(Malaysia) Terengganu
G	(Thailand) Chonburi	(Singapore) Home United
H	(Malaysia) Kelantan	(Indonesia) Arema

== Bracket ==
While the bracket below shows the entire knockout stage, the draw for the round of 16 matches was determined at the time of the group draw.

The draw for the quarter-finals and beyond was held separately, after the conclusion of the round of 16.

Round of 16
(Iraq) Arbil	4
(Uzbekistan) Neftchi Farg'ona	0
(Malaysia) Kelantan	3
(Malaysia) Terengganu	2
(Thailand) Chonburi	1
(Iraq) Al-Zawra'a	0
(Syria) Al-Shorta	3
(Singapore) Home United	0
(Kuwait) Al-Qadsia	1(1)
Al-Kuwait (p)	1(3)
(Jordan) Al-Wehdat (a.e.t.)	2
(Kuwait) Kazma	1
(Hong Kong) Kitchee	0
(Indonesia) Arema	2
(Saudi Arabia) Al-Ettifaq	1
(Oman) Al-Suwaiq	0

Quarter-finals
(Iraq) Arbil	5	1	6
(Malaysia) Kelantan	1	1	2
(Thailand) Chonburi (a.e.t.)	1	4	5
(Syria) Al-Shorta	2	2	4
Al-Kuwait	0	3	3
(Jordan) Al-Wehdat	0	0	0
(Indonesia) Arema	0	0	0
(Saudi Arabia) Al-Ettifaq	2	2	4

Semi-finals
(Iraq) Arbil	4	4	8
(Thailand) Chonburi	1	1	2
Al-Kuwait	4	2	6
(Saudi Arabia) Al-Ettifaq	1	0	1

Final
(Iraq) Arbil	0
Al-Kuwait	4

== Round of 16 ==
The matches were played 22 and 23 May 2012.

Team 1	Score	Team 2
Al-Qadsia (Kuwait)	1–1 (a.e.t.) (1–3 p)	Al-Kuwait
Al-Ettifaq (Saudi Arabia)	1–0	(Oman) Al-Suwaiq
Arbil (Iraq)	4–0	(Uzbekistan) Neftchi Farg'ona
Al-Wehdat (Jordan)	2–1 (a.e.t.)	(Kuwait) Kazma
Al-Shorta (Syria)	3–0	(Singapore) Home United
Chonburi (Thailand)	1–0	(Iraq) Al-Zawra'a
Kitchee (Hong Kong)	0–2	(Indonesia) Arema
Kelantan (Malaysia)	3–2	(Malaysia) Terengganu

=== Matches ===
22 May 2012
19:00 UTC+07:00

Chonburi (Thailand)	1–0	(Iraq) Al-Zawra'a
Pipob 8'	Report

Chonburi Municipality Stadium, Chonburi
Attendance: 5,695
Referee: Liu Kwok Man (Hong Kong)

22 May 2012
19:00 UTC+03:00

Al-Shorta (Syria)	3–0	(Singapore) Home United
Anzité 4' (o.g.); Jafal 76'; Rafe 82'	Report

Amman International Stadium, Amman (Jordan)^{1}
Attendance: 250
Referee: Ko Hyung-Jin (Korea Republic)

22 May 2012
19:15 UTC+03:00

Al-Qadsia (Kuwait)	1–1 (a.e.t.)	Al-Kuwait
Al Soma 13'	Report	Rogerinho 60'
Penalties
Al-Mutawa (penalty missed); Fadel (penalty missed); Said (penalty scored); Al Ansari (penalty missed)	1–3	(penalty missed) Baba; (penalty scored) Hakem; (penalty scored) Awadh; (penalty scored) Al Ateeqi

Mohammed Al-Hamad Stadium, Hawalli
Attendance: 1,000
Referee: Ali Abdulnabi (Bahrain)

22 May 2012
21:00 UTC+03:00

Al-Ettifaq (Saudi Arabia)	1–0	(Oman) Al-Suwaiq
Al-Sulim 90+3'	Report

Prince Mohamed bin Fahd Stadium, Dammam
Attendance: 1,324
Referee: Andre El Haddad (Lebanon)

23 May 2012
20:00 UTC+08:00

Kitchee (Hong Kong)	0–2	(Indonesia) Arema
	Report	Jati 32', 53'

Tseung Kwan O Sports Ground, Hong Kong
Attendance: 2,856
Referee: Choi Myung-Yong (Korea Republic)

23 May 2012
20:45 UTC+08:00

Kelantan (Malaysia)	3–2	(Malaysia) Terengganu
Nor Farhan 4', 17'; Fahmi 45+2'	Report	Faruqi 56'; Doe 85' (pen.)

Sultan Mohammad IV Stadium, Kota Bharu
Attendance: 18,652
Referee: Yousef Al-Marzouq (Kuwait)

23 May 2012
18:30 UTC+03:00

Arbil (Iraq)	4–0	(Uzbekistan) Neftchi Farg'ona
Mubarak 40'; Al Hussain 68'; Radhi 88'; Pulatov 90+1' (o.g.)	Report

Franso Hariri Stadium, Arbil
Attendance: 16,000
Referee: Vo Minh Tri (Vietnam)

23 May 2012
19:00 UTC+03:00

Al-Wehdat (Jordan)	2–1 (a.e.t.)	(Kuwait) Kazma
Abdel-Halim 95'; Abu Hwaiti 102'	Report	Nasser 120+1' (pen.)

King Abdullah Stadium, Amman
Attendance: 6,210
Referee: Saeid Mozaffarizadeh (Iran)

Notes

- Note 1: Due to the political crisis in Syria, the AFC requested Syrian clubs to play their home matches at neutral venues.

== Quarter-finals ==
The first legs were played 18 September 2012, and the second legs were played 25 and 26 September 2012.

Team 1	Agg.	Team 2	1st leg	2nd leg
Al-Kuwait	3–0	(Jordan) Al-Wehdat	0–0	3–0
Arema (Indonesia)	0–4	(Saudi Arabia) Al-Ettifaq	0–2	0–2
Arbil (Iraq)	6–2	(Malaysia) Kelantan	5–1	1–1
Chonburi (Thailand)	5–4	(Syria) Al-Shorta	1–2	4–2 (a.e.t.)

=== First legs ===
18 September 2012
16:30 UTC+07:00

Arema (Indonesia)	0–2	(Saudi Arabia) Al-Ettifaq
	Report	Al-Shehri 68'; Al-Sulim 90+5'

Gajayana Stadium, Malang
Attendance: 2,000
Referee: Vo Minh Tri (Vietnam)

18 September 2012
19:00 UTC+07:00

Chonburi (Thailand)	1–2	(Syria) Al-Shorta
Thiago Cunha 3'	Report	Jafal 39'; Geílson 44'

Chonburi Municipality Stadium, Chonburi
Attendance: 5,818
Referee: Kim Sang-Woo (Korea Republic)

18 September 2012
18:30 UTC+03:00

Arbil (Iraq)	5–1	(Malaysia) Kelantan
Halgurd 38'; Radhi 50' (pen.); Salah 66'; Sadir 72', 90+3'	Report	Badri 41' (pen.)

Franso Hariri Stadium, Arbil
Attendance: 16,000
Referee: Marai Al Awaji (Saudi Arabia)

18 September 2012
19:30 UTC+03:00

Al-Kuwait	0–0	(Jordan) Al-Wehdat
	Report

Al Kuwait Sports Club Stadium, Kuwait City
Attendance: 2,000
Referee: Ali Sabbagh (Lebanon)

=== Second legs ===
25 September 2012
20:45 UTC+08:00

Kelantan (Malaysia)	1–1	(Iraq) Arbil
Ghaddar 90+2' (pen.)	Report	Sula 37'

Sultan Mohammad IV Stadium, Kota Bharu
Attendance: 5,024
Referee: Choi Myung-Yong (Korea Republic)

Arbil won 6–2 on aggregate.

25 September 2012
19:00 UTC+03:00

Al-Wehdat (Jordan)	0–3	Al-Kuwait
	Report	Jemâa 20'; Hammami 60'; Rogerinho 70'

King Abdullah Stadium, Amman
Attendance: 12,000
Referee: Banjar Al-Dosari (Qatar)

Al-Kuwait won 3–0 on aggregate.

25 September 2012
20:10 UTC+03:00

Al-Ettifaq (Saudi Arabia)	2–0	(Indonesia) Arema
Al Mahaijri 53'; Al-Salem 66'	Report

Prince Mohamed bin Fahd Stadium, Dammam
Attendance: 1,851
Referee: Minoru Tōjō (Japan)

Al-Ettifaq won 4–0 on aggregate.

26 September 2012
16:00 UTC+03:00

Al-Shorta (Syria)	2–4 (a.e.t.)	(Thailand) Chonburi
Jafal 53' (pen.); Ghalioum 93'	Report	On-Mo 36'; Thiago Cunha 38', 111', 119'

Prince Mohammed Stadium, Zarqa (Jordan)^{2}
Attendance: 200
Referee: Saeid Mozaffarizadeh (Iran)

Chonburi won 5–4 on aggregate.

Notes

- Note 2: Due to the political crisis in Syria, the AFC requested Syrian clubs to play their home matches at neutral venues.

== Semi-finals ==
The first legs were played 2 October 2012, and the second legs were played 23 October 2012.

Team 1	Agg.	Team 2	1st leg	2nd leg
Al-Kuwait	6–1	(Saudi Arabia) Al-Ettifaq	4–1	2–0
Arbil (Iraq)	8–2	(Thailand) Chonburi	4–1	4–1

=== First legs ===
2 October 2012
17:00 UTC+03:00

Arbil (Iraq)	4–1	(Thailand) Chonburi
Radhi 24', 50'; Phuk-hom 66' (o.g.); Sadir 74'	Report	On-Mo 47'

Franso Hariri Stadium, Arbil
Attendance: 16,000
Referee: Andre El Haddad (Lebanon)

2 October 2012
19:30 UTC+03:00

Al-Kuwait	4–1	(Saudi Arabia) Al-Ettifaq
Jemâa 7', 11'; Hammami 58' (pen.); Al Qahtani 90+3'	Report	Al-Salem 24'

Al Kuwait Sports Club Stadium, Kuwait City
Attendance: 3,000
Referee: Liu Kwok Man (Hong Kong)

=== Second legs ===
23 October 2012
19:00 UTC+07:00

Chonburi (Thailand)	1–4	(Iraq) Arbil
Phuk-hom 25'	Report	Abdul-Amir 18'; Radhi 63', 70'; Karim 82'

Chonburi Municipality Stadium, Chonburi
Attendance: 8,174
Referee: Alireza Faghani (Iran)

Arbil won 8–2 on aggregate.

23 October 2012
19:45 UTC+03:00

Al-Ettifaq (Saudi Arabia)	0–2	Al-Kuwait
	Report	Rogerinho 57'; Khamis 72'

Prince Mohamed bin Fahd Stadium, Dammam
Attendance: 5,518
Referee: Mohamed Al Zarooni (UAE)

Al-Kuwait won 6–1 on aggregate.

== Final ==
The final of the 2012 AFC Cup was hosted by one of the finalists, decided by a draw. According to the draw on 14 June 2012, the winner of semi-final 2 would host the final. Therefore, Arbil was the home team.

3 November 2012
17:00 UTC+03:00

Arbil (Iraq)	0–4	Al-Kuwait
	Report	Hammami 3' (pen.), 90'; Rogerinho 42'; Khamis 83'

Franso Hariri Stadium, Arbil
Attendance: 30,000
Referee: Valentin Kovalenko (Uzbekistan)
