= 2012 AFC Cup group stage =

Group stage of the 9th edition of AFC Cup

The 2012 AFC Cup group stage was contested by a total of 32 teams (20 from West Asia Zone and 12 from East Asia Zone). They included:

- 28 teams which directly entered the 2012 AFC Cup group stage (17 from West Asia Zone and 11 from East Asia Zone)
- 3 losers of the 2012 AFC Champions League qualifying play-off final round (2 from West Asia Zone and 1 from East Asia Zone)
- 1 winner of the 2012 AFC Cup qualifying play-off (from West Asia Zone)

The draw for the group stage was held at the AFC house in Kuala Lumpur, Malaysia on 6 December 2011, 15:00 UTC+08:00. The 32 teams were drawn into eight groups of four. Clubs from the same country may not be drawn into the same group.

In each group, teams played each other home-and-away in a round-robin format. The matchdays were 6–7 March, 20–21 March, 3–4 April, 10–11 April, 24–25 April, and 8–9 May 2012. The winners and runners-up of each group advanced to the knockout stage.

== Tiebreakers ==
The teams are ranked according to points (3 points for a win, 1 point for a tie, 0 points for a loss) and tie breakers are in following order:

1. Greater number of points obtained in the group matches between the teams concerned;
2. Goal difference resulting from the group matches between the teams concerned;
3. Greater number of goals scored in the group matches between the teams concerned; (Away goals do not apply)
4. Goal difference in all the group matches;
5. Greater number of goals scored in all the group matches;
6. Kicks from the penalty mark if only two teams are involved and they are both on the field of play;
7. Fewer score calculated according to the number of yellow and red cards received in the group matches; (1 point for each yellow card, 3 points for each red card as a consequence of two yellow cards, 3 points for each direct red card, 4 points for each yellow card followed by a direct red card)
8. Drawing of lots.

== Groups ==
Each team had been numbered from 1 to 4, the numbers determine the order of the fixtures:

- Match Day 1: 1 vs 4, 3 vs 2
- Match Day 2: 2 vs 1, 4 vs 3
- Match Day 3: 1 vs 3, 4 vs 2
- Match Day 4: 3 vs 1, 2 vs 4
- Match Day 5: 4 vs 1, 2 vs 3
- Match Day 6: 1 vs 2, 3 vs 4

=== Group A ===
Team	Pld	W	D	L	GF	GA	GD	Pts	QAD	SUW	FAI	ITT
(Kuwait) Al-Qadsia	6	3	1	2	14	7	+7	10 (Note: Tiebreakers: Al-Qadsia and Al-Suwaiq are ranked by their head-to-head record (Al-Qadsia: 6 pts; Al-Suwaiq: 0 pts).)		2–0	1–2	5–2
(Oman) Al-Suwaiq	6	3	1	2	8	9	−1	10	1–5		0–0	2–0
(Jordan) Al-Faisaly	6	2	3	1	10	7	+3	9	1–1	2–3		1–1
(Syria) Al-Ittihad	6	1	1	4	5	14	−9	4	1–0	0–2	1–4	

Legend: Blue = home team win; Yellow = draw; Red = away team win.
Notes:

Tiebreakers
Team	Pld	W	D	L	GF	GA	GD	Pts
(Kuwait) Al-Qadsia	2	2	0	0	7	1	+6	6
(Oman) Al-Suwaiq	2	0	0	2	1	7	−6	0

6 March 2012
18:30 UTC+03:00

Al-Qadsia (Kuwait)	2–0	(Oman) Al-Suwaiq
Al-Mutairi 8'; Al Soma 51'	Report

Mohammed Al-Hamad Stadium, Hawalli
Attendance: 1,000
Referee: Yadollah Jahanbazi (Iran)
6 March 2012
18:00 UTC+02:00

Al-Faisaly (Jordan)	1–1	(Syria) Al-Ittihad
Al-Sheikh 30'	Report	Fares 49' (pen.)

Amman International Stadium, Amman
Attendance: 4,000
Referee: Kim Sang-Woo (Korea Republic)

20 March 2012
19:30 UTC+04:00

Al-Suwaiq (Oman)	0–0	(Jordan) Al-Faisaly
	Report

Al-Seeb Stadium, Al-Seeb
Attendance: 500
Referee: Hettikamkanamge Perera (Sri Lanka)
20 March 2012
19:00 UTC+03:00

Al-Ittihad (Syria)	1–0	(Kuwait) Al-Qadsia
Kalasi 23'	Report

Mohammed Al-Hamad Stadium, Hawalli (Kuwait)^{1}
Attendance: 1,000
Referee: Jameel Abdulhusin (Bahrain)

3 April 2012
16:00 UTC+04:00

Al-Suwaiq (Oman)	2–0	(Syria) Al-Ittihad
Al-Jalabubi 23'; Al-Saadi 83'	Report

Al-Seeb Stadium, Al-Seeb
Attendance: 300
Referee: Ma Ning (China P.R.)
3 April 2012
18:45 UTC+03:00

Al-Qadsia (Kuwait)	1–2	(Jordan) Al-Faisaly
Keita 14'	Report	Al-Maharmeh 53'; Hayel 73'

Mohammed Al-Hamad Stadium, Hawalli
Attendance: 1,000
Referee: Liu Kwok Man (Hong Kong)

11 April 2012
16:00 UTC+04:00

Al-Ittihad (Syria)	0–2	(Oman) Al-Suwaiq
	Report	Ablaye Gaye 23'; Al-Saadi 78'

Al-Seeb Stadium, Al-Seeb (Oman)^{1}
Attendance: 150
Referee: Chaiya Mahapab (Thailand)
11 April 2012
18:00 UTC+03:00

Al-Faisaly (Jordan)	1–1	(Kuwait) Al-Qadsia
Hayel 78'	Report	Al-Mutawa 73' (pen.)

Amman International Stadium, Amman
Attendance: 4,500
Referee: Marai Al Awaji (Saudi Arabia)

25 April 2012
16:00 UTC+04:00

Al-Suwaiq (Oman)	1–5	(Kuwait) Al-Qadsia
Ablaye Gaye 24'	Report	Al Enezi 2', 31'; Al Fadhel 70'; Al-Mutairi 74'; Al-Mutawa 79'

Al-Seeb Stadium, Al-Seeb
Attendance: 500
Referee: Jumpei Iida (Japan)
25 April 2012
19:00 UTC+03:00

Al-Ittihad (Syria)	1–4	(Jordan) Al-Faisaly
Ewerson 90+1'	Report	Al-Maharmeh 5'; Attiah 38'; Hayel 81', 87'

Amman International Stadium, Amman (Jordan)^{1}
Attendance: 4,500
Referee: Akbar Bakhshi Zadeh (Iran)

9 May 2012
18:00 UTC+03:00

Al-Faisaly (Jordan)	2–3	(Oman) Al-Suwaiq
Hayel 34'; Al-Maharmeh 86'	Report	Al-Noufali 8'; Al-Saadi 48'; Al-Saadi 84'

Amman International Stadium, Amman
Attendance: 1,000
Referee: Pratap Singh (India)
9 May 2012
19:15 UTC+03:00

Al-Qadsia (Kuwait)	5–2	(Syria) Al-Ittihad
Hadj Aïssa 2', 48'; Al-Mutairi 42', 52'; Al Soma 45'	Report	Omar 32'; Al Hasan 90+3'

Mohammed Al-Hamad Stadium, Hawalli
Attendance: 3,800
Referee: Banjar Al-Dosari (Qatar)

Notes

- Note 1: Due to the political crisis in Syria, the AFC requested Syrian clubs to play their home matches at neutral venues.

=== Group B ===
Team	Pld	W	D	L	GF	GA	GD	Pts	ERB	KAZ	ORU	KEB
(Iraq) Erbil	6	4	2	0	11	5	+6	14		1–1	2–1	2–0
(Kuwait) Kazma	6	3	2	1	10	6	+4	11	1–2		1–1	3–0
(Yemen) Al-Oruba	6	2	2	2	10	8	+2	8	2–2	1–2		4–1
(India) East Bengal	6	0	0	6	2	14	−12	0	0–2	1–2	0–1	

Source: RSSSF
Legend: Blue = home team win; Yellow = draw; Red = away team win.
6 March 2012
15:00 UTC+05:30

East Bengal (India)	0–1	(Yemen) Al-Oruba
	Report	Alao 45+1' (pen.)

Salt Lake Stadium, Kolkata
Attendance: 10,000
Referee: Tayeb Hasan Shamsuzzaman (Bangladesh)
6 March 2012
16:00 UTC+03:00

Arbil (Iraq)	1–1	(Kuwait) Kazma
Efe 78'	Report	Al Harby 71'

Franso Hariri Stadium, Arbil
Attendance: 12,000
Referee: Abdulla Hassan Mohamed (UAE)

20 March 2012
16:00 UTC+03:00

Al-Oruba (Yemen)	2–2	(Iraq) Arbil
Naggar 66', 87'	Report	Sabagh 42'; Radhi 54'

Franso Hariri Stadium, Arbil (Iraq)^{2}
Attendance: 10,000
Referee: Yaqoob Abdul Baki (Oman)
20 March 2012
18:30 UTC+03:00

Kazma (Kuwait)	3–0	(India) East Bengal
Nasser 38'; Al Wuhaib 44'; Jammeh 58'	Report

Al-Sadaqua Walsalam Stadium, Kuwait City
Attendance: 1,000
Referee: Marai Al Awaji (Saudi Arabia)

4 April 2012
15:15 UTC+05:30

East Bengal (India)	0–2	(Iraq) Arbil
	Report	Radhi 76'; Al Hussain 90+4'

Salt Lake Stadium, Kolkata
Attendance: 10,000
Referee: Leow Thiam Hoe (Singapore)
4 April 2012
17:25 UTC+03:00

Al-Oruba (Yemen)	1–2	(Kuwait) Kazma
Abdulkareem 34'	Report	Nasser 74' (pen.); Faraj 85'

Al-Sadaqua Walsalam Stadium, Kuwait City (Kuwait)^{2}
Attendance: 324
Referee: Vladislav Tseytlin (Uzbekistan)

10 April 2012
18:00 UTC+03:00

Arbil (Iraq)	2–0	(India) East Bengal
Al Hussain 45+1' (pen.), 47' (pen.)	Report

Franso Hariri Stadium, Arbil
Attendance: 5,000
Referee: Ali Sabbagh (Lebanon)
10 April 2012
18:45 UTC+03:00

Kazma (Kuwait)	1–1	(Yemen) Al-Oruba
Nasser 86'	Report	Alao 57' (pen.)

Al-Sadaqua Walsalam Stadium, Kuwait City
Attendance: 500
Referee: Sukhbir Singh (Singapore)

25 April 2012
16:00 UTC+03:00

Al-Oruba (Yemen)	4–1	(India) East Bengal
Duke 6', 34'; Sharyan 59'; Al-Gabr 71'	Report	Edmilson 78'

Prince Mohammed Stadium, Zarqa (Jordan)^{2}
Attendance: 600
Referee: Khurram Shahzad (Pakistan)
25 April 2012
18:45 UTC+03:00

Kazma (Kuwait)	1–2	(Iraq) Arbil
Nasser 45+3' (pen.)	Report	Halgurd 16'; Khalaf 57'

Al-Sadaqua Walsalam Stadium, Kuwait City
Attendance: 400
Referee: Ng Kai Lam (Hong Kong)

9 May 2012
15:30 UTC+05:30

East Bengal (India)	1–2	(Kuwait) Kazma
Edmilson 18'	Report	Al Ajmi 8'; Al Azmi 90+1'

Salt Lake Stadium, Kolkata
Attendance: 1,000
Referee: Kim Sang-Woo (Korea Republic)
9 May 2012
18:30 UTC+03:00

Arbil (Iraq)	2–1	(Yemen) Al-Oruba
Karim 32' (pen.); Radhi 62'	Report	Al-Ghazi 12'

Franso Hariri Stadium, Arbil
Attendance: 6,000
Referee: Naser Al Ghafari (Jordan)

Notes

- Note 2: Due to the political crisis in Yemen, the AFC requested Yemeni clubs to play their home matches at neutral venues.

=== Group C ===
Team	Pld	W	D	L	GF	GA	GD	Pts	ETT	KUW	AHE	VB
(Saudi Arabia) Al-Ettifaq	6	4	2	0	18	7	+11	14		2–2	0–0	2–0
Al-Kuwait	6	3	2	1	17	10	+7	11	1–5		1–0	7–1
(Lebanon) Al-Ahed	6	2	1	3	7	11	−4	7	1–3	0–4		5–3
(Maldives) VB	6	0	1	5	9	23	−14	1	3–6	2–2	0–1	

Legend: Blue = home team win; Yellow = draw; Red = away team win.
7 March 2012
18:30 UTC+03:00

Al-Kuwait	1–5	(Saudi Arabia) Al-Ettifaq
Rogerinho 86'	Report	Tagliabué 51' (pen.), 53', 81'; Al-Salem 78'; Walibi 90+4'

Al Kuwait Sports Club Stadium, Kuwait City
Attendance: 2,000
Referee: Kim Jong-Hyeok (Korea Republic)
7 March 2012
17:45 UTC+02:00

Al-Ahed (Lebanon)	5–3	(Maldives) VB
Chaito 29'; Lambin 32'; Dakik 54'; Atwi 77'; Zreik 80'	Report	Cengiz 56', 65'; Tadevosyan 90' (o.g.)

Camille Chamoun Sports City Stadium, Beirut
Attendance: 1,100
Referee: Vladislav Tseytlin (Uzbekistan)

21 March 2012
21:00 UTC+05:00

VB (Maldives)	2–2	Al-Kuwait
Wright 32'; Shamweel 54'	Report	Khamis 73'; Fané 90+2'

Rasmee Dhandu Stadium, Malé
Attendance: 1,000
Referee: Wang Di (China P.R.)
21 March 2012
20:25 UTC+03:00

Al-Ettifaq (Saudi Arabia)	0–0	(Lebanon) Al-Ahed
	Report

Prince Mohamed bin Fahd Stadium, Dammam
Attendance: 2,360
Referee: Banjar Al-Dosari (Qatar)

3 April 2012
17:45 UTC+03:00

Al-Ahed (Lebanon)	0–4	Al-Kuwait
	Report	Rogerinho 2'; Al-Shammari 20'; Khamis 50', 80'

Camille Chamoun Sports City Stadium, Beirut
Attendance: 1,500
Referee: Timur Faizullin (Kyrgyzstan)
3 April 2012
21:00 UTC+05:00

VB (Maldives)	3–6	(Saudi Arabia) Al-Ettifaq
Mansaray 39'; Shamweel 59'; Hussain 63'	Report	Tagliabué 5', 10', 35'; Al-Hamed 43'; Al Thyab 48'; Al-Sulim 90'

Rasmee Dhandu Stadium, Malé
Attendance: 1,000
Referee: Khurram Shahzad (Pakistan)

11 April 2012
18:45 UTC+03:00

Al-Kuwait	1–0	(Lebanon) Al-Ahed
Baba 82'	Report

Al Kuwait Sports Club Stadium, Kuwait City
Attendance: 2,000
Referee: Naser Al-Ghafary (Jordan)
11 April 2012
20:30 UTC+03:00

Al-Ettifaq (Saudi Arabia)	2–0	(Maldives) VB
Al-Mubarak 51'; Al-Sulim 62'	Report

Prince Mohamed bin Fahd Stadium, Dammam
Attendance: 1,632
Referee: Salah Abbas Alabbasi (Bahrain)

24 April 2012
21:00 UTC+05:00

VB (Maldives)	0–1	(Lebanon) Al-Ahed
	Report	Bazzi 9'

Rasmee Dhandu Stadium, Malé
Attendance: 300
Referee: Sgt. Win Cho (Myanmar)
24 April 2012
20:40 UTC+03:00

Al-Ettifaq (Saudi Arabia)	2–2	Al-Kuwait
Tagliabué 56', 90'	Report	Fané 42'; Al Kandari 51'

Prince Mohamed bin Fahd Stadium, Dammam
Attendance: 1,500
Referee: Hiroyoshi Takayama (Japan)

8 May 2012
17:45 UTC+03:00

Al-Ahed (Lebanon)	1–3	(Saudi Arabia) Al-Ettifaq
Zreik 90+2'	Report	Al-Mubarak 39'; Al-Thiab 89'; Al-Shehri 90+4'

Saida Municipal Stadium, Sidon
Attendance: 200
Referee: Ali Sabah Adday Al-Qaysi (Iraq)
8 May 2012
19:15 UTC+03:00

Al-Kuwait	7–1	(Maldives) VB
Al Kandari 3'; Rogerinho 43'; Khamis 61'; Jameel 64' (o.g.); Seumen 68', 85'; Waleed 90+1'	Report	Nashid 45+3'

Al Kuwait Sports Club Stadium, Kuwait City
Attendance: 200
Referee: Ibrahim Al-Hosni (Oman)

=== Group D ===
Team	Pld	W	D	L	GF	GA	GD	Pts	WEH	NEF	ORU	SAL
(Jordan) Al-Wehdat	6	4	0	2	15	9	+6	12		3–1	2–1	5–0
(Uzbekistan) Neftchi Farg'ona	6	3	2	1	11	7	+4	11	2–1		3–1	3–0
(Oman) Al-Orouba	6	2	1	3	8	10	−2	7	4–2	0–0		1–0
(India) Salgaocar	6	1	1	4	6	14	−8	4	1–2	2–2	3–1	

Legend: Blue = home team win; Yellow = draw; Red = away team win.
7 March 2012
15:00 UTC+05:00

Neftchi Farg'ona (Uzbekistan)	2–1	(Jordan) Al-Wehdat
Alijonov 8' (pen.); Berdiev 79'	Report	Shelbaieh 90+1'

Fargona Stadium, Fergana
Attendance: 10,350
Referee: Banjar Al-Dosari (Qatar)
7 March 2012
19:00 UTC+04:00

Al-Orouba (Oman)	1–0	(India) Salgaocar
Al-Mashari 67'	Report

Al-Seeb Stadium, Al-Seeb
Attendance: 200
Referee: Ng Kai Lam (Hong Kong)

21 March 2012
17:45 UTC+05:30

Salgaocar (India)	2–2	(Uzbekistan) Neftchi Farg'ona
Sueoka 45+2'; Oliveira 82'	Report	Isroilov 26'; Alijonov 59'

Fatorda Stadium, Margao
Attendance: 5,250
Referee: Çarymyrat Gurbanow (Turkmenistan)
21 March 2012
18:00 UTC+02:00

Al-Wehdat (Jordan)	2–1	(Oman) Al-Orouba
Salah 41'; Shelbaieh 67'	Report	Al-Mashari 75'

King Abdullah Stadium, Amman
Attendance: 2,000
Referee: Ali Shaban (Kuwait)

4 April 2012
16:00 UTC+05:00

Neftchi Farg'ona (Uzbekistan)	3–1	(Oman) Al-Orouba
Yaqubov 12'; Berdiev 42' (pen.); Saidov 61'	Report	Teixeira 90+4'

Fargona Stadium, Fergana
Attendance: 14,000
Referee: Mohd Nafeez Abdul Wahab (Malaysia)
4 April 2012
18:00 UTC+03:00

Al-Wehdat (Jordan)	5–0	(India) Salgaocar
Deeb 25' (pen.); Elias 47'; Al-Sabah 72'; Shelbaieh 90'; Abu Hwaiti 90+3'	Report

King Abdullah Stadium, Amman
Attendance: 6,541
Referee: Ali Sabah Adday Al-Qaysi (Iraq)

10 April 2012
16:00 UTC+04:00

Al-Orouba (Oman)	0–0	(Uzbekistan) Neftchi Farg'ona
	Report

Al-Seeb Stadium, Al-Seeb
Attendance: 100
Referee: Ko Hyung-Jin (Korea Republic)
10 April 2012
17:45 UTC+05:30

Salgaocar (India)	1–2	(Jordan) Al-Wehdat
Ahmed 71'	Report	Abu Hwaiti 8'; Shelbaieh 82'

Fatorda Stadium, Margao
Attendance: 5,000
Referee: Jumpei Iida (Japan)

24 April 2012
17:45 UTC+05:30

Salgaocar (India)	3–1	(Oman) Al-Orouba
Fernandes 45+1'; Gonsalves 48'; Bevan 64'	Report	Teixeira 81' (pen.)

Fatorda Stadium, Margao
Attendance: 3,007
Referee: Vo Minh Tri (Vietnam)
24 April 2012
18:00 UTC+03:00

Al-Wehdat (Jordan)	3–1	(Uzbekistan) Neftchi Farg'ona
Shelbaieh 5', 57'; Al-Sabah 84'	Report	Isroilov 34'

King Abdullah Stadium, Amman
Attendance: 9,206
Referee: Yadollah Jahanbazi (Iran)

8 May 2012
16:30 UTC+05:00

Neftchi Farg'ona (Uzbekistan)	3–0	(India) Salgaocar
Smolyachenko 1', 50'; Berdiev 77'	Report

Fargona Stadium, Fergana
Attendance: 14,000
Referee: Mukhtar Al Yarimi (Yemen)
8 May 2012
16:00 UTC+04:00

Al-Orouba (Oman)	4–2	(Jordan) Al-Wehdat
Al-Mukhaini 19', 31'; Al-Wahaibi 34'; Al-Mashaikhi 89'	Report	Deeb 29'; Ra'fat 86' (pen.)

Al-Seeb Stadium, Al-Seeb
Attendance: 210
Referee: Marai Al Awaji (Saudi Arabia)

=== Group E ===
Team	Pld	W	D	L	GF	GA	GD	Pts	SHO	ZAW	SAF	TIL
(Syria) Al-Shorta	6	5	0	1	14	6	+8	15		3–2	3–2	3–0
(Iraq) Al-Zawra'a	6	4	0	2	12	5	+7	12	2–1		1–0	5–0
(Lebanon) Safa	6	3	0	3	6	7	−1	9	0–2	1–0		1–0
(Yemen) Al-Tilal	6	0	0	6	1	15	−14	0	0–2	0–2	1–2	

Legend: Blue = home team win; Yellow = draw; Red = away team win.
6 March 2012
17:45 UTC+02:00

Al-Tilal (Yemen)	1–2	(Lebanon) Safa
Boqshan 40'	Report	Azar 21', 52'

Camille Chamoun Sports City Stadium, Beirut (Lebanon)^{3}
Attendance: 500
Referee: Çarymyrat Gurbanow (Turkmenistan)
7 March 2012
15:00 UTC+02:00

Al-Shorta (Syria)	3–2	(Iraq) Al-Zawra'a
Leonardo 23'; Rafe 69', 71'	Report	Jabbar 60'; Mohammed Saad 85' (pen.)

Petra Stadium, Amman (Jordan)^{4}
Attendance: 400
Referee: Marai Al Awaji (Saudi Arabia)

20 March 2012
15:30 UTC+03:00

Al-Zawra'a (Iraq)	5–0	(Yemen) Al-Tilal
Mohammed Saad 27' (pen.), 52'; Hesham Mohammed 59', 84'; Ali Saad 87'	Report

Duhok Stadium, Dohuk
Attendance: 3,000
Referee: Abdulla Hassan Mohamed (UAE)
20 March 2012
17:00 UTC+02:00

Safa (Lebanon)	0–2	(Syria) Al-Shorta
	Report	Rafe 73', 90+3'

Camille Chamoun Sports City Stadium, Beirut
Attendance: 100
Referee: Naser Al-Ghafary (Jordan)

3 April 2012
15:30 UTC+03:00

Al-Zawra'a (Iraq)	1–0	(Lebanon) Safa
Ibrahim 85'	Report

Duhok Stadium, Dohuk
Attendance: 3,500
Referee: Yaqoob Abdul Baki (Oman)
3 April 2012
19:00 UTC+03:00

Al-Shorta (Syria)	3–0	(Yemen) Al-Tilal
Rafe 63'; Al Waked 72'; Awad 76'	Report

Prince Mohammed Stadium, Zarqa (Jordan)^{4}
Attendance: 150
Referee: Yousef Al-Marzouq (Kuwait)

11 April 2012
16:00 UTC+03:00

Al-Tilal (Yemen)	0–2	(Syria) Al-Shorta
	Report	Hurmuz 80' (o.g.); Abadi 90+2'

Petra Stadium, Amman (Jordan)^{3}
Attendance: 100
Referee: Tayeb Hasan Shamsuzzaman (Bangladesh)
11 April 2012
17:00 UTC+03:00

Safa (Lebanon)	1–0	(Iraq) Al-Zawra'a
Atwi 90+1'	Report

Camille Chamoun Sports City Stadium, Beirut
Attendance: 300
Referee: Ali Shaban (Kuwait)

25 April 2012
16:00 UTC+03:00

Al-Zawra'a (Iraq)	2–1	(Syria) Al-Shorta
Qasem 58'; Hesham Mohammed 65'	Report	Rafe 86'

Duhok Stadium, Dohuk
Attendance: 3,000
Referee: Salah Abbas Alabbasi (Bahrain)
25 April 2012
17:00 UTC+03:00

Safa (Lebanon)	1–0	(Yemen) Al-Tilal
Al-Zoughbi 10'	Report

Saida Municipal Stadium, Sidon
Attendance: 75
Referee: Dmitriy Mashentsev (Kyrgyzstan)

9 May 2012
16:00 UTC+03:00

Al-Tilal (Yemen)	0–2	(Iraq) Al-Zawra'a
	Report	Sabah 13'; Hussein 77'

Duhok Stadium, Dohuk (Iraq)^{3}
Attendance: 1,500
Referee: Leow Thiam Hoe (Singapore)
9 May 2012
19:00 UTC+03:00

Al-Shorta (Syria)	3–2	(Lebanon) Safa
Rafe 18' (pen.), 50'; Habib 70'	Report	Saadi 20'; Kaddoura 90'

King Abdullah Stadium, Amman (Jordan)^{4}
Attendance: 100
Referee: Yadollah Jahanbazi (Iran)

Notes

- Note 3: Due to the political crisis in Yemen, the AFC requested Yemeni clubs to play their home matches at neutral venues.
- Note 4: Due to the political crisis in Syria, the AFC requested Syrian clubs to play their home matches at neutral venues.

=== Group F ===
Team	Pld	W	D	L	GF	GA	GD	Pts	KIT	TER	SNA	TAM
(Hong Kong) Kitchee	6	3	2	1	9	4	+5	11		2–2	2–0	3–1
(Malaysia) Terengganu	6	3	1	2	10	8	+2	10	0–2		6–2	0–2
(Vietnam) Sông Lam Nghệ An	6	2	1	3	6	9	−3	7	1–0	0–1		3–0
(Singapore) Tampines Rovers	6	1	2	3	3	7	−4	5	0–0	0–1	0–0	

Legend: Blue = home team win; Yellow = draw; Red = away team win.
6 March 2012
16:00 UTC+07:00

Sông Lam Nghệ An (Vietnam)	0–1	(Malaysia) Terengganu
	Report	Manaf 51'

Vinh Stadium, Vinh
Attendance: 6,142
Referee: Strebre Delovski (Australia)
6 March 2012
20:00 UTC+08:00

Kitchee (Hong Kong)	3–1	(Singapore) Tampines Rovers
Liang Zicheng 3', 62'; Tarrés 66'	Report	Ali 20'

Tseung Kwan O Sports Ground, Hong Kong
Attendance: 1,314
Referee: Sgt. Win Cho (Myanmar)

20 March 2012
16:45 UTC+08:00

Terengganu (Malaysia)	0–2	(Hong Kong) Kitchee
	Report	Tarrés 44'; Chu Siu Kei 75'

Sultan Ismail Nasiruddin Shah Stadium, Kuala Terengganu
Attendance: 6,500
Referee: Yu Ming-hsun (Chinese Taipei)
20 March 2012
19:30 UTC+08:00

Tampines Rovers (Singapore)	0–0	(Vietnam) Sông Lam Nghệ An
	Report

Bishan Stadium, Singapore
Attendance: 368
Referee: Ma Ning (China P.R.)

4 April 2012
17:00 UTC+08:00

Kitchee (Hong Kong)	2–0	(Vietnam) Sông Lam Nghệ An
Rehman 11'; Chu Siu Kei 73'	Report

Tseung Kwan O Sports Ground, Hong Kong
Attendance: 1,760
Referee: Abdulla Hassan Mohamed (UAE)
4 April 2012
19:30 UTC+08:00

Tampines Rovers (Singapore)	0–1	(Malaysia) Terengganu
	Report	Joseph 4'

Jalan Besar Stadium, Singapore
Attendance: 801
Referee: Kim Jong-Hyeok (Korea Republic)

10 April 2012
16:45 UTC+08:00

Terengganu (Malaysia)	0–2	(Singapore) Tampines Rovers
	Report	Đurić 37', 90'

Sultan Ismail Nasiruddin Shah Stadium, Kuala Terengganu
Attendance: 2,500
Referee: Çarymyrat Gurbanow (Turkmenistan)
10 April 2012
16:00 UTC+07:00

Sông Lam Nghệ An (Vietnam)	1–0	(Hong Kong) Kitchee
Nguyễn Hồng Việt 56'	Report

Vinh Stadium, Vinh
Attendance: 1,500
Referee: Apisit Aonrak (Thailand)

25 April 2012
19:30 UTC+08:00

Tampines Rovers (Singapore)	0–0	(Hong Kong) Kitchee
	Report

Jalan Besar Stadium, Singapore
Attendance: 710
Referee: Hettikamkanamge Perera (Sri Lanka)
25 April 2012
20:45 UTC+08:00

Terengganu (Malaysia)	6–2	(Vietnam) Sông Lam Nghệ An
Ashaari 5'; Doe 12', 34', 73'; Hadi 38'; Joseph 87'	Report	Phạm Văn Quyến 29'; Hoàng Văn Bình 84'

Sultan Ismail Nasiruddin Shah Stadium, Kuala Terengganu
Attendance: 2,100
Referee: Pratap Singh (India)

9 May 2012
16:00 UTC+07:00

Sông Lam Nghệ An (Vietnam)	3–0	(Singapore) Tampines Rovers
Lê Thế Cường 6', 45'; Dieng 20'	Report

Vinh Stadium, Vinh
Attendance: 800
Referee: Ko Hyung-Jin (Korea Republic)
9 May 2012
20:00 UTC+08:00

Kitchee (Hong Kong)	2–2	(Malaysia) Terengganu
Tarrés 9', 45'	Report	Ashaari 14'; Hadi 69'

Tseung Kwan O Sports Ground, Hong Kong
Attendance: 1,179
Referee: Chaiya Mahapab (Thailand)

=== Group G ===
Team	Pld	W	D	L	GF	GA	GD	Pts	CHO	HOM	CIT	YAN
(Thailand) Chonburi	6	4	2	0	10	5	+5	14		1–0	2–0	1–0
(Singapore) Home United	6	3	1	2	9	6	+3	10	1–2		3–1	3–1
(Hong Kong) Citizen	6	2	1	3	9	12	−3	7	3–3	1–2		2–1
(Myanmar) Yangon United	6	0	2	4	4	9	−5	2	1–1	0–0	1–2	

Legend: Blue = home team win; Yellow = draw; Red = away team win.
7 March 2012
15:30 UTC+06:30

Yangon United (Myanmar)	1–1	(Thailand) Chonburi
Jovanović 41'	Report	Etae 90+3'

Thuwunna Stadium, Yangon
Attendance: 5,500
Referee: Fan Qi (China P.R.)
7 March 2012
19:30 UTC+08:00

Home United (Singapore)	3–1	(Hong Kong) Citizen
Ihata 62'; Mendy 66'; Qiu Li 87'	Report	Nakamura 45+1'

Bishan Stadium, Singapore
Attendance: 1,023
Referee: Vo Minh Tri (Vietnam)

21 March 2012
19:00 UTC+07:00

Chonburi (Thailand)	1–0	(Singapore) Home United
Takam 69'	Report

Chonburi Municipality Stadium, Chonburi
Attendance: 5,158
Referee: Jumpei Iida (Japan)
21 March 2012
20:00 UTC+08:00

Citizen (Hong Kong)	2–1	(Myanmar) Yangon United
Hélio 51'; Baise 90'	Report	Jovanović 65'

Mong Kok Stadium, Hong Kong
Attendance: 1,026
Referee: Mohd Nafeez Abdul Wahab (Malaysia)

3 April 2012
15:30 UTC+06:30

Yangon United (Myanmar)	0–0	(Singapore) Home United
	Report

Thuwunna Stadium, Yangon
Attendance: 4,000
Referee: Ibrahim Al-Hosni (Oman)
3 April 2012
19:00 UTC+07:00

Chonburi (Thailand)	2–0	(Hong Kong) Citizen
Chaiman 49' (pen.); Diakité 60'	Report

Chonburi Municipality Stadium, Chonburi
Attendance: 4,364
Referee: Pratap Singh (India)

11 April 2012
19:30 UTC+08:00

Home United (Singapore)	3–1	(Myanmar) Yangon United
Qiu Li 70'; Mendy 75', 80'	Report	Ristic 37'

Bishan Stadium, Singapore
Attendance: 3,146
Referee: Wang Di (China P.R.)
11 April 2012
20:00 UTC+08:00

Citizen (Hong Kong)	3–3	(Thailand) Chonburi
Nakamura 8'; Chiu Chun Kit 90+1'; Sham Kwok Fai 90+4'	Report	Samana 20'; On-Mo 69'; Etae 88'

Mong Kok Stadium, Hong Kong
Attendance: 1,210
Referee: Akbar Bakhshi Zadeh (Iran)

24 April 2012
19:00 UTC+07:00

Chonburi (Thailand)	1–0	(Myanmar) Yangon United
Chaiman 63'	Report

Chonburi Municipality Stadium, Chonburi
Attendance: 5,148
Referee: Vladislav Tseytlin (Uzbekistan)
24 April 2012
20:00 UTC+08:00

Citizen (Hong Kong)	1–2	(Singapore) Home United
Sham Kwok Fai 17'	Report	Mendy 77'; Anzité 90+2'

Mong Kok Stadium, Hong Kong
Attendance: 1,390
Referee: Yu Ming-hsun (Chinese Taipei)

8 May 2012
15:30 UTC+06:30

Yangon United (Myanmar)	1–2	(Hong Kong) Citizen
Yan Aung Kyaw 66'	Report	Nakamura 6'; Tam Lok Hin 55'

Thuwunna Stadium, Yangon
Attendance: 3,000
Referee: Hettikamkanamge Perera (Sri Lanka)
8 May 2012
19:30 UTC+08:00

Home United (Singapore)	1–2	(Thailand) Chonburi
Daud 86'	Report	On-Mo 5'; Kachaplayuk 77'

Bishan Stadium, Singapore
Attendance: 1,393
Referee: Hiroyoshi Takayama (Japan)

=== Group H ===
Team	Pld	W	D	L	GF	GA	GD	Pts	KEL	ARE	NVB	AYE
(Malaysia) Kelantan	6	4	1	1	10	5	+5	13		3–0	0–0	1–0
(Indonesia) Arema	6	2	1	3	12	12	0	7 (Note: Tiebreakers: Arema, Navibank Sài Gòn and Ayeyawady United are ranked by their head-to-head record (Arema: 7 pts; Navibank Sài Gòn: 6 pts; Ayeyawady United: 4 pts).)	1–3		6–2	1–1
(Vietnam) Navibank Sài Gòn	6	2	1	3	10	12	−2	7	1–2	3–1		4–1
(Myanmar) Ayeyawady United	6	2	1	3	7	10	−3	7	3–1	0–3	2–0	

Legend: Blue = home team win; Yellow = draw; Red = away team win.
Notes:

Tiebreakers
Team	Pld	W	D	L	GF	GA	GD	Pts
(Indonesia) Arema	4	2	1	1	11	6	+5	7
(Vietnam) Navibank Sài Gòn	4	2	0	2	9	10	−1	6
(Myanmar) Ayeyawady United	4	1	1	2	4	8	−4	4

7 March 2012
15:00 UTC+07:00

Arema (Indonesia)	1–1	(Myanmar) Ayeyawady United
Chmelo 28'	Report	Dinata 63' (o.g.)

Gajayana Stadium, Malang
Attendance: 2,000
Referee: Ibrahim Al-Hosni (Oman)
7 March 2012
20:45 UTC+08:00

Kelantan (Malaysia)	0–0	(Vietnam) Navibank Sài Gòn
	Report

Bukit Jalil National Stadium, Kuala Lumpur
Attendance: 5,452
Referee: Yu Ming-hsun (Chinese Taipei)

21 March 2012
15:30 UTC+06:30

Ayeyawady United (Myanmar)	3–1	(Malaysia) Kelantan
Nwaneri 6' (o.g.); Aung Kyaw Myo 42'; Ngangue 81'	Report	Ghaddar 66' (pen.)

Thuwunna Stadium, Yangon
Attendance: 1,500
Referee: Ng Kai Lam (Hong Kong)
21 March 2012
18:00 UTC+07:00

Navibank Sài Gòn (Vietnam)	3–1	(Indonesia) Arema
Fonseca 33', 65', 82'	Report	Jati 5'

Thống Nhất Stadium, Ho Chi Minh City
Attendance: 4,005
Referee: Ng Chiu Kok (Hong Kong)

4 April 2012
18:00 UTC+07:00

Navibank Sài Gòn (Vietnam)	4–1	(Myanmar) Ayeyawady United
Fonseca 39', 59', 82'; Nguyễn Văn Nghĩa 45+3'	Report	Sai Than Aung 48'

Thống Nhất Stadium, Ho Chi Minh City
Attendance: 1,500
Referee: Hettikamkanamge Perera (Sri Lanka)
4 April 2012
20:45 UTC+08:00

Kelantan (Malaysia)	3–0	(Indonesia) Arema
Ghaddar 22', 47', 89'	Report

Sultan Mohammad IV Stadium, Kota Bharu
Attendance: 9,245
Referee: Kim Sang-Woo (Korea Republic)

10 April 2012
15:00 UTC+07:00

Arema (Indonesia)	1–3	(Malaysia) Kelantan
Chmelo 35'	Report	Ghaddar 16' (pen.), 59'; Zamri 86'

Gajayana Stadium, Malang
Attendance: 2,000
Referee: Nivon Robesh Gamini (Sri Lanka)
10 April 2012
15:30 UTC+06:30

Ayeyawady United (Myanmar)	2–0	(Vietnam) Navibank Sài Gòn
Latiak 39'; Sithu Than 90+1'	Report

Thuwunna Stadium, Yangon
Attendance: 522
Referee: Strebre Delovski (Australia)

24 April 2012
15:30 UTC+06:30

Ayeyawady United (Myanmar)	0–3	(Indonesia) Arema
	Report	Jati 10'; Amiruddin 28'; Musafri 45'

Thuwunna Stadium, Yangon
Attendance: 800
Referee: Timur Faizullin (Kyrgyzstan)
24 April 2012
18:00 UTC+07:00

Navibank Sài Gòn (Vietnam)	1–2	(Malaysia) Kelantan
Fonseca 34'	Report	Indra 80'; Ghaddar 84'

Thống Nhất Stadium, Ho Chi Minh City
Attendance: 1,500
Referee: Sukhbir Singh (Singapore)

8 May 2012
15:00 UTC+07:00

Arema (Indonesia)	6–2	(Vietnam) Navibank Sài Gòn
Chmelo 9' (pen.), 45+1' (pen.); Musafri 35', 39'; Amiruddin 43', 79'	Report	Fonseca 64'; Nguyễn Quang Hải 70'

Gajayana Stadium, Malang
Attendance: 3,500
Referee: Fan Qi (China P.R.)
8 May 2012
20:45 UTC+08:00

Kelantan (Malaysia)	1–0	(Myanmar) Ayeyawady United
Nwoha 47'	Report

Sultan Mohammad IV Stadium, Kota Bharu
Attendance: 7,372
Referee: Tayeb Hasan Shamsuzzaman (Bangladesh)
