= 2011–12 Al-Zawraa SC season =

Al Zawraa
2011–12 season
- Chairman: Falah Hassan
- Manager: Radhi Shenaishil
- Ground: Al Zawraa Stadium; Al Shaab Stadium; Duhok Stadium - 2012 AFC Cup
- Iraqi Premier League: 9th
- Top goalscorer: League: Hesham Mohammed (10); All: Hesham Mohammed (12)
Home colours	Away colours

In the 2011-12 season, Al Zawraa will be competing in the Iraqi Premier League and the AFC Cup.

== Squad ==
Note: Flags indicate national team as defined under FIFA eligibility rules; some limited exceptions apply. Players may hold more than one non-FIFA nationality.

No.	Pos.	Nation	Player
2	DF	IRQ	Mohammed Ali Karim
4	DF	IRQ	Fares Hasan
5	MF	IRQ	Hashim Muwaffaq
6	DF	IRQ	Alamir Haidar
7	FW	IRQ	Karrar Tariq
8	FW	IRQ	Hesham Mohammed (captain)
9	FW	IRQ	Ali Mansour Alwan
10	FW	IRQ	Ali Saad
11	FW	IRQ	Murtadha Abdul Kareem
12	MF	IRQ	Ahmad Ali Hussein
13	DF	IRQ	Muayad Khalid
14	DF	IRQ	Muhammed Ahmed
14	FW	IRQ	Marwan Hussein
15	FW	IRQ	Mohammed Saad

No.	Pos.	Nation	Player
16	MF	IRQ	Haider Raheem
17	MF	IRQ	Haidar Sabah
20	MF	IRQ	Tholfaqqar Malek
21	MF	IRQ	Ali Qasem
22	GK	IRQ	Ammar Ali Al-Azzawi
23	MF	IRQ	Azher Taher
24	MF	IRQ	Khaldoun Ibrahim
28	MF	IRQ	Sajad Hussein
29	DF	IRQ	Waleed Khalid
31	DF	IRQ	Ahmed Jaseb
37	FW	IRQ	Mohammed Abdul-Jabar
—	GK	IRQ	Ahmed Ali
—	FW	IRQ	Ali Majid
—	DF	IRQ	

== Transfers ==
=== In ===
Date	Pos.	Name	From	Fee
August 2011	MF	(Iraq) Ahmed Ebrahim	(Iraq) Zakho FC	-
September 2011	MF	(Iraq) Hashim Muwaffaq	(Iraq) Baghdad FC	-
September 2011	FW	(Iraq) Karrar Tariq	(Iraq) Najaf FC	-
September 2011	DF	(Iraq) Haidar Raheem	(Iraq) Al-Quwa Al-Jawiya	-
September 2011	DF	(Iraq) Haidar Jabbar	(Iraq) Arbil FC	-
September 2011	FW	(Iraq) Ali Mansour	(Iraq) Baghdad FC	-
October 2011	DF	(Iraq) Mohammed Ali Karim	(Iraq) Arbil FC	-
October 2011	FW	(Iraq) Murtadha Abdul Kareem	(Iraq) Diyala FC	-
January 2012	MF	(Iraq) Khaldoun Ibrahim	(Iraq) Naft Tehran	-

=== Out ===
Date	Pos.	Name	To	Fee
August 2011	MF	(Iraq) Usama Ali	(Iraq) Dohuk FC	-
September 2011	MF	(Iraq) Samer Saeed	(Iraq) Al Shorta	-
October 2011	MF	(Iraq) Ahmed Ebrahim	(Iraq) Zakho FC	-
October 2011	DF	(Iraq) Amouri Eidan	(Iraq) Al Karkh	-
October 2011	DF	(Iraq) Gaith Abdul-Ghani	(Iraq) Al Karkh	-

== Stadium ==
=== Competitive ===
During the season, the stadium of Al Zawraa will be demolished. A company will build a new stadium that will be completed in 2014. Since they can't play their games at Al Zawraa Stadium, they will be playing at Al Shaab Stadium from February 2012.

=== AFC Cup ===
Al Zawraa will play their games, in the AFC Cup, at Duhok Stadium. Because of safety concerns they are not allowed to play in Baghdad

== Matches ==
=== Competitive ===
==== Iraqi Premier League ====
4 November 2011 1	Al Zawraa	1 – 0	Al-Hedood	Baghdad
12:00 GMT	Ali Saad 28'			Stadium: Al-Zawraa Stadium

9 November 2011 2	Kirkuk	1 – 0	Al Zawraa	Kirkuk
12:00 GMT	Ali Sairawan 26'			Stadium: Kirkuk Stadium

18 November 2011 3	Al Zawraa	0 – 0	Dohuk	Baghdad
11:30 GMT				Stadium: Al Zawraa Stadium

24 November 2011 4	Al Talaba	2 – 1	Al Zawraa	Baghdad
14:00 GMT	Hikmat Irzayij 85', 88'		Sajjad Hussein 71'	Stadium: Al Shaab Stadium

29 November 2011 5	Al Zawraa	1 – 2	Zakho	Baghdad
11:30 GMT	Ali Qasem 72'		Samih Rustum 8'; Mohammed Mahmood 92'	Stadium: Al Zawraa Stadium

3 December 2011 6	Al Zawraa	1 – 1	Najaf	Baghdad
11:30 GMT	Mohammed Saad 37'		Salih Sadeer 53'	Stadium: Al Zawraa Stadium

15 December 2011 7	Al-Sinaa	2 – 3	Al Zawraa	Baghdad
11:30 GMT	Ayad Shaalan 26'; Aqil Kasem 60'		Hesham Mohammed 12'; Ali Qasem 42'; Marwan Hussein 85'	Stadium: Al Sinaa Stadium

20 December 2011 8	Al Zawraa	1 – 0	Al-Naft	Baghdad
11:30 GMT	Hesham Mohammed 26'			Stadium: Al Zawraa Stadium

25 December 2011 9	Al-Masafi	1 – 1	Al Zawraa	Baghdad
11:30 GMT	Saad Nateq 67'		Hesham Mohammed 65'	Stadium: Al Naft Stadium

1 January 2012 10	Al Zawraa	2 – 1	Al Shorta	Baghdad
12:00 GMT	Ali Saad 20'; Hesham Mohammed 40'		Imad Ghali 94'	Stadium: Al Shaab Stadium

7 January 2012 11	Baghdad	1 – 1	Al Zawraa	Baghdad
11:30 GMT	Ali Jawad 59'		Hesham Mohammed 13'	Stadium: Al Shaab Stadium

19 January 2012 12	Al Zawraa	2 – 0	Al-Shirqat	Baghdad
11:30 GMT	Hesham Mohammed 21'; Ali Qasem 48'			Stadium: Al Zawraa Stadium

26 January 2012 13	Al-Kahraba	2 – 1	Al Zawraa	Baghdad
11:30 GMT	Waleed Khaled 40', 48'		Marwan Hussein 85'	Stadium: Al Naft Stadium

2 February 2012 14	Arbil	1 – 0	Al Zawraa	Arbil
13:30 GMT	Louay Salah 30'			Stadium: Franso Hariri Stadium

10 February 2012 15	Al Zawraa	1 – 1	Al-Quwa Al-Jawiya	Baghdad
12:30 GMT	Hesham Mohammed 69'		Hamadi Ahmed 80'	Stadium: Al Shaab Stadium

15 February 2012 16	Al Karkh	3 – 1	Al Zawraa	Baghdad
11:30 GMT	Muhanned Abdul-Rahman 16'; Saleh Tareq 45'; Zaman Jawad 81'		Haidar Sabah 5'	Stadium: Al Karkh Stadium

16 April 2012 17	Karbala	0 – 3	Al Zawraa	Karbala
12:30 GMT				Stadium: Karbala Stadium

28 February 2012 18	Al Zawraa	2 – 1	Al Minaa	Baghdad
11:30 GMT	Fares Hasan 67'; Mohammed Abdul-Jabar 76'		Ammar Abdul Husain 34'	Stadium: Al Shaab Stadium

14 March 2012 19	Al Zawraa	5 – 2	Al-Taji	Baghdad
11:30 GMT	Mohammed Abdul-Jabar 5'; Hesham Mohammed 43', 64'; Ali Saad 49'; Muayad Khalid 80'		Ali Ubaid 57'; Sattar Jabbar 85'	Stadium: Al Shorta Stadium

7 April 2012 20	Al-Hedood	0 – 6	Al Zawraa	Baghdad
12:00 GMT			Hesham Mohammed 6'; Haidar Sabah 12', 69'; Mohammed Abdul-Jabar 35'; Ali Saad 58'; Tholfaqqar Malek 83'	Stadium: Al-Quwa Al-Jawiya Stadium

==== AFC Cup ====
===== Group stage =====
Team	Pld	W	D	L	GF	GA	GD	Pts	SHO	ZAW	SAF	TIL
(Syria) Al-Shorta	6	5	0	1	14	6	+8	15		3–2	3–2	3–0
(Iraq) Al-Zawra'a	6	4	0	2	12	5	+7	12	2–1		1–0	5–0
(Lebanon) Safa	6	3	0	3	6	7	−1	9	0–2	1–0		1–0
(Yemen) Al-Tilal	6	0	0	6	1	15	−14	0	0–2	0–2	1–2	

7 March 2012 Matchday 1	Al Shorta (Syria)	3 – 2	(Iraq) Al Zawraa	Amman, Jordan
13:00 GMT	Leonardo Devanir de Paula 23'; Raja Rafe 69', 71'	Report	Mohammed Abdul-Jabar 60'; Mohammed Saad 85' (pen.)	Stadium: Petra Stadium; Attendance: 400; Referee: Marai Al Awaji (Saudi Arabia)

20 March 2012 Matchday 2	Al-Zawraa (Iraq)	5 – 0	(Yemen) Al-Tilal	Duhok Stadium, Dohuk
TBC GMT	Mohammed Saad 27' (pen.), 52'; Hesham Mohammed 59', 84'; Ali Saad 87'	Report		Attendance: 3,000; Referee: Abdulla Hassan Mohamed (UAE)

3 April 2012 Matchday 3	Al-Zawra'a (Iraq)	1 – 0	(Lebanon) Safa	Duhok Stadium, Dohuk
15:30 UTC+03:00	Ibrahim 85'	Report		Attendance: 3,500; Referee: Yaqoob Abdul Baki (Oman)

11 April 2012 Matchday 4	Safa (Lebanon)	1 – 0	(Iraq) Al-Zawra'a	Camille Chamoun Sports City Stadium, Beirut
17:00 UTC+03:00	Atwi 90+1'	Report		Attendance: 300; Referee: Ali Shaban (Kuwait)

25 April 2012 Matchday 5	Al Zawraa (Iraq)	2 - 1	(Syria) Al Shorta	Dohuk
TBC GMT				Stadium: Duhok Stadium

9 May 2012 Matchday 6	Al-Tilal (Yemen)	0 - 2	(Iraq) Al Zawraa	Beirut
TBC GMT				Stadium: Camille Chamoun Sports City Stadium
