= 2011–12 Citizen AA season =

Citizen AA
2011–12 season
- Chairman: Pui Kwan Kay
- Head Coach: Chu Kwok Kuen
- Home ground: Mong Kok Stadium
- League: 4th
- Senior Shield: Quarter-finals
- FA Cup: N/A (Not Begin)
- League Cup: Semi-finals
Home colours	Away colours	Third colours

The 2011–12 Citizen AA season involves Citizen competing in the First Division League, Senior Shield, FA Cup, League Cup and AFC Cup. Citizen qualified for the AFC Cup after winning the 2010–11 Senior Shield.

== Competitions ==
=== First Division League ===
10 September 2011 1	Sham Shui Po SA	0–1	Citizen AA	Sham Shui Po Sports Ground
16:30		Report	Paulinho Piracicaba 22'	Attendance: 1,855

16 September 2011 2	Yokohama FC Hong Kong	2–2	Citizen AA	Siu Sai Wan Sports Ground
21:00	Roberto Fronza 22'; Sandro (yellow card) 35' (goal) 84'	Report	Baise 43'; Nakamura 50'	Attendance: 266

=== Quarter-finals ===
29 October 2011 First leg	Tuen Mun SA	2–2	Citizen AA	Tuen Mun
16:30		Report		Stadium: Tuen Mun Tang Shiu Kin Sports Ground

26 November 2011 Second leg	Citizen AA	1–2 (3–4 agg.)	Tuen Mun SA	Hong Kong
15:30		Report		Stadium: Mong Kok Stadium

=== FA Cup ===
25 March 2012 1	Kitchee SC	1–0	Citizen AA	Hong Kong
18:00	Chan Man Fai 20' (yellow card) 81'; Dani Cancela (yellow card) 83'	Report	Wong Yiu Fu (yellow card) 16'; Chiu Chun Kit (yellow card) 77'	Stadium: Hong Kong Stadium; Attendance: 1,354

=== League Cup ===
26 February 2012 Quarter-Final	Sunray Cave JC Sun Hei	0–1	Citizen	Mong Kok
14:30(GMT+8)	Cordeiro (yellow card) 35'	Report	65' (pen.) Festus; (yellow card) 67' Sham Kwok Keung	Stadium: Mong Kok Stadium (Capacity:6,680); Attendance: 1,829; Referee: Ng Chiu Kok; Assistant referees: Chow Chun Kit; Lam Chi Ho; Fourth official: Ng Kai Lam

10 March 2012 Semi-Final	TSW Pegasus	4–1	Citizen	Mong Kok
14:30(GMT+8)	Lee Hong Lim 10'; Jaimes McKee 45', 53'; Lucas (yellow card) 63'; Leandro Carrijó 71'; Chan Ming Kong (yellow card) 74'	Report	Sham Kwok Keung (yellow card) 17'; Baise (yellow card) 38' (goal) 64' (pen.); Hélio (yellow card) 55'; Wong Yiu Fu (yellow card) 70'; Sham Kwok Fai (yellow card) 73'	Stadium: Mong Kok Stadium (Capacity:6,680)

=== AFC Cup ===
Team	Pld	W	D	L	GF	GA	GD	Pts	CHO	HOM	CIT	YAN
(Thailand) Chonburi	6	4	2	0	10	5	+5	14		1–0	2–0	1–0
(Singapore) Home United	6	3	1	2	9	6	+3	10	1–2		3–1	3–1
(Hong Kong) Citizen	6	2	1	3	9	12	−3	7	3–3	1–2		2–1
(Myanmar) Yangon United	6	0	2	4	4	9	−5	2	1–1	0–0	1–2	

Legend: Blue = home team win; Yellow = draw; Red = away team win.

7 March 2012 Group G	Home United (Singapore)	3–1	(Hong Kong) Citizen	Bishan Stadium, Singapore
19:30 UTC+08:00	Ihata 62'; Mendy 66'; Qiu Li 87'	Report	Nakamura 45+1'	Attendance: 1,023; Referee: Vo Minh Tri (Vietnam)

21 March 2012 Group G	Citizen (Hong Kong)	2–1	(Myanmar) Yangon United	Mong Kok Stadium, Hong Kong
20:00 UTC+08:00	Fung Kai Hong (yellow card) 44'; Hélio 51'; Baise 90'	Report	Yan Aung Kyaw (yellow card) 27'; Jovanović 65'; Pyae Phyo Aung (yellow card) 88'	Attendance: 1,026; Referee: (Malaysia) Mohd Abdul Wahab

3 April 2012 Group G	Chonburi (Thailand)	2–0	(Hong Kong) Citizen	Chonburi Municipality Stadium, Chonburi
19:00 UTC+07:00	Chaiman 49' (pen.); Diakité 60' (yellow card) 90+2'; Etae (yellow card) 80'	Report	Chan Man Chun (yellow card) 29'	Attendance: 4,364; Referee: (India) Pratap Singh

11 April 2012 Group G	Citizen (Hong Kong)	3–3	(Thailand) Chonburi	Mong Kok Stadium, Hong Kong
20:00 UTC+08:00	Nakamura 8' (yellow card) 90+2'; Yeung Chi Lun (yellow card) 47'; Chiu Chun Kit 90+1'; Sham Kwok Fai 90+6'	Report	Samana 20'; On-Mo 70'; Etae 88'	Attendance: 1,210; Referee: (Iran) Saeid Bakhshizadeh

24 April 2012 Group G	Citizen (Hong Kong)	1–2	(Singapore) Home United	Mong Kok Stadium, Hong Kong
20:00 UTC+08:00	Sham Kwok Fai 17'; Sham Kwok Keung (yellow card) 32'	Report	Mendy 77'; Nor Azli Yusoff (yellow card) 78'; Anzité 90+2'	Attendance: 1,390; Referee: (Chinese Taipei) Yu Ming Hsun

8 May 2012 Group G	Yangon United (Myanmar)	1–2	(Hong Kong) Citizen	Thuwunna Stadium, Yangon
15:30 UTC+06:30	Yan Aung Kyaw 66'; Kyaw Doom (yellow card) 90+5'	Report	Nakamura 6' (yellow card) 90+4'; Tam Lok Hin 55'	Attendance: 3,000; Referee: (Sri Lanka) H.Dilan Perera
