= 21st Arabian Gulf Cup =

International football tournament in 2013

كأس الخلیج العربي 2013، خليجي 21

Tournament details
- Host country: Bahrain
- Dates: 5–18 January
- Teams: 8
- Venues: 2 (in 2 host cities)

Final positions
- Champions: United Arab Emirates (2nd title)
- Runners-up: Iraq
- Third place: Kuwait
- Fourth place: Bahrain

Tournament statistics
- Matches played: 16
- Goals scored: 36 (2.25 per match)
- Attendance: 319,000 (19,938 per match)
- Top scorer(s): (Kuwait) Abdulhadi Khamis (United Arab Emirates) Ahmed Khalil (3 goals each)
- Best player: (United Arab Emirates) Omar Abdulrahman
- Best goalkeeper: (Iraq) Noor Sabri
- Fair play award: Iraq

The 21st Arabian Gulf Cup (Arabic: كأس الخليج العربي) was the twenty-first edition of the biennial football competition. It took place in Bahrain in January 2013. The competition was originally scheduled to be hosted in the city of Basra, Iraq, but was moved to Bahrain in October 2011 to ensure that Iraq could suitably host the competition in the 22nd edition.

== Seeding of teams ==
The eight participating teams were divided into two groups, Bahrain (the host nation) were placed in Group A, Kuwait (the holder) in Group B, while the rest of the teams were placed in a pot based on FIFA rankings. The draw was held in Bahrain on 18 October 2012.

Pot	National Team	FIFA Ranking
A	Bahrain (hosts)	115
A	Kuwait (holders)	112
B	Iraq	80
B	Oman	95
C	Qatar	101
C	Saudi Arabia	113
D	United Arab Emirates	116
D	Yemen	157

== Venues ==
Riffa	Isa Town
Bahrain National Stadium	Khalifa Sports City Stadium
Capacity: 23,000	Capacity: 10,000

== Opening ceremony ==
The opening ceremony of the 21st Arabian Gulf Cup took place in the Bahrain National Stadium on 5 January. The event featured the attendance of Hamad bin Isa al Khalifa, the King of Bahrain, members of the ruling family, Sepp Blatter, the president of FIFA, Michel Platini, the president of UEFA as well as other officials. Blatter commended the ceremony, stating that "The opening ceremony was very nice: 9.5 out of 10 because perfection does not exist". Following the ceremony, Blatter also stated that the organisational level of the Gulf Cup would have to be improved if it was to be a FIFA-sanctioned event and wanted the cup to be played simultaneously with the Africa Cup of Nations.

== Group stage ==
All times are local time (UTC+03:00).

=== Group A ===
Team	Pld	W	D	L	GF	GA	GD	Pts
United Arab Emirates	3	3	0	0	7	2	+5	9
Bahrain	3	1	1	1	2	2	0	4
Qatar	3	1	0	2	3	5	−2	3
Oman	3	0	1	2	1	4	−3	1

5 January 2013
19:15

Bahrain	0–0	Oman
	Report

Bahrain National Stadium, Riffa
Attendance: 35,000
Referee: Ravshan Irmatov (Uzbekistan)
5 January 2013
21:15

Qatar	1–3	United Arab Emirates
Ibrahim 11' (pen.)	Report	Abdulrahman 13'; Mabkhout 29'; Ahmed 66'

Khalifa Sports City Stadium, Isa Town
Attendance: 20,000
Referee: Khalil Al Ghamdi (Saudi Arabia)

8 January 2013
16:15

Qatar	2–1	Oman
Ibrahim 56' (pen.); El-Sayed 88'	Report	Al-Hadhri 71' (pen.)

Bahrain National Stadium, Riffa
Attendance: 5,000
Referee: Mukhtar Al Yarimi (Yemen)
8 January 2013
19:15

Bahrain	1–2	United Arab Emirates
Al Malood 75'	Report	Mabkout 40'; Hassan 85'

Bahrain National Stadium, Riffa
Attendance: 35,000
Referee: Ali Sabah Adday Al-Qaysi (Iraq)

11 January 2013
17:45

United Arab Emirates	2–0	Oman
Khalil 83', 86'	Report

Khalifa Sports City Stadium, Isa Town
Attendance: 7,000
Referee: Yousef Al-Marzouq (Kuwait)
11 January 2013
17:45

Bahrain	1–0	Qatar
Aaish 25' (pen.)	Report

Bahrain National Stadium, Riffa
Attendance: 35,000
Referee: Viktor Kassai (Hungary)

=== Group B ===
Team	Pld	W	D	L	GF	GA	GD	Pts
Iraq	3	3	0	0	5	0	+5	9
Kuwait	3	2	0	1	3	1	+2	6
Saudi Arabia	3	1	0	2	2	3	−1	3
Yemen	3	0	0	3	0	6	−6	0

6 January 2013
16:15

Kuwait	2–0	Yemen
Nasser 63'; Al-Mutawa 82'	Report

Khalifa Sports City Stadium, Isa Town
Attendance: 10,000
Referee: Banjar Al-Dosari (Qatar)
6 January 2013
19:15

Saudi Arabia	0–2	Iraq
	Report	Shaker 18'; Hawsawi 72' (o.g.)

Khalifa Sports City Stadium, Isa Town
Attendance: 15,000
Referee: Viktor Kassai (Hungary)

9 January 2013
16:15

Iraq	1–0	Kuwait
Ahmed 29'	Report

Khalifa Sports City Stadium, Isa Town
Attendance: 12,000
Referee: Nawaf Shukralla (Bahrain)
9 January 2013
19:15

Yemen	0–2	Saudi Arabia
	Report	Al-Qahtani 33'; F. Al-Muwallad 86'

Khalifa Sports City Stadium, Isa Town
Attendance: 15,000
Referee: Mohamed Al Zarouni (United Arab Emirates)

12 January 2013
17:45

Kuwait	1–0	Saudi Arabia
Nasser 13'	Report

Bahrain National Stadium, Riffa
Attendance: 25,000
Referee: Ravshan Irmatov (Uzbekistan)
12 January 2013
17:45

Iraq	2–0	Yemen
Ismail 16'; Ahmed 36'	Report

Khalifa Sports City Stadium, Isa Town
Attendance: 10,000
Referee: Abdullah Al-Hilali (Oman)

== Knockout stage ==
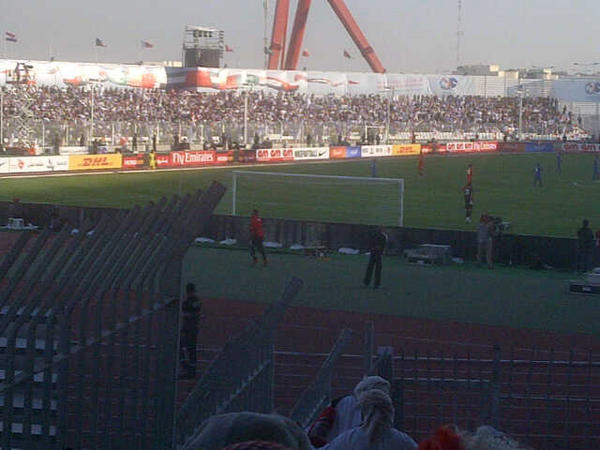
The third place match with Bahrain and Kuwait.

Semi-finals
15 January – Riffa
United Arab Emirates	1
Kuwait	0
15 January – Riffa
Iraq	1 (4)
Bahrain	1 (2)

Final
18 January – Riffa
United Arab Emirates (a.e.t.)	2
Iraq	1
Third place
18 January – Isa Town
Kuwait	6
Bahrain	1

=== Semi-finals ===
15 January 2013
16:15

United Arab Emirates	1–0	Kuwait
Khalil 89'	Report

Bahrain National Stadium, Riffa
Attendance: 30,000
Referee: Abdullah Al-Hilali (Oman)

15 January 2013
18:45

Iraq	1–1 (a.e.t.)	Bahrain
Mahmoud 18'	Report	Baba 61'
Penalties
Yasin (penalty missed); Ismail (penalty scored); Salem (penalty scored); Mahmoud (penalty scored); Sabri (penalty scored)	4–2	(penalty missed) Husain; (penalty scored) Aaish; (penalty scored) Dhiya; (penalty missed) Al Malood

Bahrain National Stadium, Riffa
Attendance: 35,000
Referee: Ravshan Irmatov (Uzbekistan)

=== Third place play-off ===
18 January 2013
15:30

Kuwait	6–1	Bahrain
Khamis 35', 38', 54' (pen.); Bani 65'; Al-Mutawa 66'; Al Salimi 71'	Report	Yusuf 1'

Bahrain National Stadium, Riffa
Attendance: 10,000
Referee: Banjar Al-Dosari (Qatar)

=== Final ===
18 January 2013
19:00

United Arab Emirates	2–1 (a.e.t.)	Iraq
Abdulrahman 28'; Al Hammadi 107'	Report	Mahmoud 81'

Bahrain National Stadium, Riffa
Attendance: 35,000
Referee: Khalil Al Ghamdi (Saudi Arabia)

21st Arabian Gulf Cup winners

United Arab Emirates
Second title

== Goalscorers ==
3 goals

- (Kuwait) Abdulhadi Khamis
- (United Arab Emirates) Ahmed Khalil

2 goals

- (Iraq) Hammadi Ahmad
- (Iraq) Younis Mahmoud
- (Kuwait) Bader Al-Mutawa
- (Kuwait) Yousef Nasser
- (Qatar) Khalfan Ibrahim
- (United Arab Emirates) Omar Abdulrahman
- (United Arab Emirates) Ali Mabkhout

1 goal

- (Bahrain) Faouzi Mubarak Aaish
- (Bahrain) Hussain Ali Baba
- (Bahrain) Abdulwahab Al Malood
- (Bahrain) Abdulla Yusuf Helal
- (Iraq) Dhurgham Ismail
- (Iraq) Salam Shaker
- (Kuwait) Abdulrahman Bani
- (Kuwait) Abdulaziz Al Salimi
- (United Arab Emirates) Ismail Al Hammadi
- (United Arab Emirates) Majed Hassan
- (United Arab Emirates) Mohamed Ahmed Gharib
- (Saudi Arabia) Fahad Al-Muwallad
- (Saudi Arabia) Yasser Al-Qahtani
- (Oman) Hussain Al-Hadhri
- (Qatar) Mohamed El-Sayed

1 own goal

- (Saudi Arabia) Osama Hawsawi (playing against Iraq)

== Team statistics ==
This table shows all team performance.

Pos	Team	Pld	W	D	L	GF	GA	GD
Final phase
1	United Arab Emirates	5	5	0	0	10	3	+7
2	Iraq	5	3	1	1	7	3	+4
3	Kuwait	5	3	0	2	9	3	+6
4	Bahrain	5	1	2	2	4	9	−5
Eliminated in the group stage
5	Saudi Arabia	3	1	0	2	2	3	−1
6	Qatar	3	1	0	2	3	5	−2
7	Oman	3	0	1	2	1	4	−3
8	Yemen	3	0	0	3	0	6	−6

== Prize money and awards ==
=== Prize money ===
The football associations were given prize money for a fourth place and above finish in the competition in riyals.

- First Place: 2,000,000 Riyals
- Second Place: 1,500,000 Riyals
- Third Place: 500,000 Riyals
- Fourth Place: 250,000 Riyals

=== Playing awards ===
The following awards were given:

Award	Player	Prize money
Fair Play Award	Iraq	200,000 Riyals
Top Scorer	(Kuwait) Abdulhadi Khamis (United Arab Emirates) Ahmad Khalil	100,000 Riyals
Most Valuable player	(United Arab Emirates) Omar Abdulrahman	100,000 Riyals
Best Goalkeeper	(Iraq) Noor Sabri	100,000 Riyals
