= 2012 AFC Cup =

9th edition of AFC Cup

Tournament details
- Dates: 18 February – 3 November 2012
- Teams: 30+3 (from 18 associations)

Final positions
- Champions: Al-Kuwait (2nd title)
- Runners-up: (Iraq) Erbil

Tournament statistics
- Matches played: 118
- Goals scored: 366 (3.1 per match)
- Attendance: 439,955 (3,728 per match)
- Top scorer(s): (Iraq) Amjad Radhi (Syria) Raja Rafe (9 goals each)
- Best player: (Brazil) Rogerinho

The 2012 AFC Cup was the ninth edition of the AFC Cup, a football competition organized by the Asian Football Confederation (AFC) for clubs from "developing countries" in Asia.

Al-Kuwait from Kuwait won their second AFC Cup title in four years, defeating Erbil from Iraq 4–0 in the final.

== Allocation of entries per association ==
The following allocation of berths for the 2012 AFC Cup was approved by the AFC in November 2011. The four associations (Yemen, Malaysia, Maldives and Myanmar) with the lowest points according to the AFC evaluation system had one team entering the group stage and another entering the play-off.

West Asia
Pos	Member Association	Points	Spots	
Pos	Member Association	Points	Group stage	Play-off
—	2012 AFC Champions League qualifying play-off final round losers^{[A]}	—	2	0
1	Kuwait	35.32	3^{[B]}	0
2	Jordan	33.47	2	0
3	Syria	30.28	2	0
4	Iraq	28.98	2	0
5	Bahrain	28.13	0^{[C]}	0
7	Oman	20.68	2	0
11	Lebanon	15.09	2	0
12	India	11.75	2	0
13	Yemen	11.02	1	1
15	Maldives	9.13	1	1
Total			19	2

East Asia
Pos	Member Association	Points	Spots	
Pos	Member Association	Points	Group stage	Play-off
—	2012 AFC Champions League qualifying play-off final round loser^{[A]}	—	2^{[G]}	0
6	Vietnam	24.16	2	0
8	Indonesia	17.58	1^{[D]}	0
9	Singapore	16.51	2	0
10	Hong Kong	15.68	2	0
14	Malaysia^{[E]}	10.79	1^{[G]}	1^{[G]}
16	Myanmar^{[F]}	5.47	1^{[G]}	1^{[G]}
Total			11^{[G]}	2^{[G]}

Notes

- ^{A} Different from previous seasons where losers of the AFC Champions League qualifying play-off semi-final round also entered the AFC Cup, from 2012 only losers of the AFC Champions League qualifying play-off final round entered the AFC Cup.
- ^{B} Kuwait have three teams entering as Al-Kuwait, the 2011 AFC Cup runners-up failed to fulfil the criteria set by AFC to compete in the 2012 AFC Champions League, and thus directly entered the 2012 AFC Cup.
- ^{C} Bahrain, while eligible to enter the AFC Cup, chose not to participate in 2012.
- ^{D} Indonesia only have one team entering as their league champion entered the 2012 AFC Champions League qualifying play-off.
- ^{E} Malaysia returned to the competition, after not participating in 2011.
- ^{F} Myanmar applied for upgrade from the AFC President's Cup to the AFC Cup, and was approved by the AFC in November 2011, and made their debut in the competition.
- ^{G} After the withdrawal of Liaoning Whowin and disqualification of Persipura Jayapura from the 2012 AFC Champions League qualifying play-off East Asia Zone, only three teams were left, meaning only one final round loser would enter the AFC Cup in the East Asia Zone instead of two. As a result, no qualifying play-off was necessary for the East Asia Zone and both the second representatives from Malaysia (Terengganu) and Myanmar (Ayeyawady United), which were originally slated to enter the AFC Cup qualifying play-off, automatically advanced to the group stage. Persipura Jayapura were later provisionally reinstated to the 2012 AFC Champions League, but the AFC decided that the loser of the qualifying play-off match between Adelaide United and Persipura Jayapura would not advance to the 2012 AFC Cup group stage.

== Qualified teams ==
A total of 33 teams participated in the 2012 AFC Cup, including 3 teams which joined as 2012 AFC Champions League qualifying play-off final round losers:

- 31 teams (19 in West Asia Zone, 12 in East Asia Zone) directly entered the group stage.
- 2 teams (both in West Asia Zone) competed in the qualifying play-off. The winners qualified for the group stage.

Group stage direct entrants: West Asia Zone (Groups A–E)
Team	Qualifying method	App	Last App
(Uzbekistan) Neftchi Farg'ona	2012 AFC Champions League qualifying play-off final round losers	2nd	2009
(Saudi Arabia) Al-Ettifaq	2012 AFC Champions League qualifying play-off final round losers	1st	none
(India) Salgaocar	2010–11 I-League champions 2011 Indian Federation Cup winners	1st	none
(India) East Bengal	2010–11 I-League runners-up	6th	2011
(Iraq) Al-Zawra'a	2010–11 Iraqi Elite League champions	2nd	2009
(Iraq) Erbil	2010–11 Iraqi Elite League runners-up	3rd	2011
(Jordan) Al-Wehdat	2010–11 Jordan League champions 2010–11 Jordan FA Cup winners	7th	2011
(Jordan) Al-Faisaly	2010–11 Jordan League runners-up	6th	2011
(Kuwait) Al-Qadsia	2010–11 Kuwaiti Premier League champions	3rd	2011
(Kuwait) Kazma	2011 Kuwait Emir Cup winners	2nd	2010
Al-Kuwait	2011 AFC Cup runners-up	4th	2011
(Lebanon) Al-Ahed	2010–11 Lebanese Premier League champions 2010–11 Lebanese FA Cup winners	6th	2011
(Lebanon) Safa	2010–11 Lebanese Premier League runners-up	3rd	2009
(Maldives) VB	2011 Dhivehi League champions 2011 Maldives FA Cup winners	5th	2011
(Oman) Al-Suwaiq	2010–11 Oman Mobile League champions	3rd	2011
(Oman) Al-Orouba^{†}	2010–11 Oman Mobile League runners-up	3rd	2011
(Syria) Al-Shorta	2010–11 Syrian Premier League AFC Cup play-off winners	1st	none
(Syria) Al-Ittihad	2010–11 Syrian Cup winners	3rd	2011
(Yemen) Al-Oruba	2010–11 Yemeni League champions	1st	none
Qualifying play-off participants: West Asia Zone
(Maldives) Victory	2011 Dhivehi League runners-up	5th	2011
(Yemen) Al-Tilal	2010–11 Yemeni League runners-up	3rd	2011

Group stage direct entrants: East Asia Zone (Groups F–H)
Team	Qualifying method	App	Last App
(Thailand) Chonburi	2012 AFC Champions League qualifying play-off final round loser	3rd	2011
(Hong Kong) Kitchee	2010–11 Hong Kong First Division League champions	2nd	2008
(Hong Kong) Citizen	2010–11 Hong Kong Senior Challenge Shield winners	1st	none
(Indonesia) Arema	2010–11 Indonesia Super League runners-up	1st	none
(Malaysia) Kelantan	2011 Malaysia Super League champions	1st	none
(Malaysia) Terengganu	2011 Malaysia FA Cup winners	1st	none
(Myanmar) Yangon United	2011 Myanmar National League champions 2011 MFF Cup winners	1st	none
(Myanmar) Ayeyawady United	2011 Myanmar National League runners-up	1st	none
(Singapore) Tampines Rovers	2011 S.League champions	5th	2011
(Singapore) Home United	2011 Singapore Cup winners	6th	2009
(Vietnam) Sông Lam Nghệ An	2011 V-League champions	2nd	2011
(Vietnam) Navibank Sài Gòn	2011 Vietnamese Cup winners	1st	none

Notes

- ^{†} Al-Orouba were the second representative from Oman, instead of Dhofar, the 2011 Sultan Qaboos Cup winners.

== Schedule ==
Schedule of dates for 2012 competition.

Phase	Round	Draw date	First leg	Second leg
Qualifying play-offs	Finals	6 December 2011	18 February 2012	
Group stage	Matchday 1	6 December 2011	6–7 March 2012	
Group stage	Matchday 2	6 December 2011	20–21 March 2012	
Group stage	Matchday 3	6 December 2011	3–4 April 2012	
Group stage	Matchday 4	6 December 2011	10–11 April 2012	
Group stage	Matchday 5	6 December 2011	24–25 April 2012	
Group stage	Matchday 6	6 December 2011	8–9 May 2012	
Knockout phase	Round of 16	6 December 2011	22–23 May 2012	
Knockout phase	Quarter-finals	14 June 2012	18 September 2012	25 September 2012
Knockout phase	Semi-finals	14 June 2012	2 October 2012	23 October 2012
Knockout phase	Final	14 June 2012	3 November 2012	

== Qualifying play-off ==
The draw for the qualifying play-off was held in Kuala Lumpur, Malaysia on 6 December 2011. The winner advanced to the group stage.

Team 1	Score	Team 2
West Asia Zone
Victory (Maldives)	3–4^{1}	(Yemen) Al-Tilal

Notes

- Note 1: Due to the political crisis in Yemen, the AFC decided to switch the venue from Aden, Yemen to Malé, Maldives.

== Group stage ==
The draw for the group stage was held in Kuala Lumpur, Malaysia on 6 December 2011. Clubs from the same country may not be drawn into the same group. The winners and runners-up of each group advanced to the knockout stage.

=== Group A ===
Team	Pld	W	D	L	GF	GA	GD	Pts	QAD	SUW	FAI	ITT
(Kuwait) Al-Qadsia	6	3	1	2	14	7	+7	10 (Note: Tiebreakers: Al-Qadsia and Al-Suwaiq are ranked by their head-to-head record (Al-Qadsia: 6 pts; Al-Suwaiq: 0 pts).)		2–0	1–2	5–2
(Oman) Al-Suwaiq	6	3	1	2	8	9	−1	10	1–5		0–0	2–0
(Jordan) Al-Faisaly	6	2	3	1	10	7	+3	9	1–1	2–3		1–1
(Syria) Al-Ittihad	6	1	1	4	5	14	−9	4	1–0	0–2	1–4	

Legend: Blue = home team win; Yellow = draw; Red = away team win.

=== Group B ===
Team	Pld	W	D	L	GF	GA	GD	Pts	ERB	KAZ	ORU	KEB
(Iraq) Erbil	6	4	2	0	11	5	+6	14		1–1	2–1	2–0
(Kuwait) Kazma	6	3	2	1	10	6	+4	11	1–2		1–1	3–0
(Yemen) Al-Oruba	6	2	2	2	10	8	+2	8	2–2	1–2		4–1
(India) East Bengal	6	0	0	6	2	14	−12	0	0–2	1–2	0–1	

Source: RSSSF
Legend: Blue = home team win; Yellow = draw; Red = away team win.

=== Group C ===
Team	Pld	W	D	L	GF	GA	GD	Pts	ETT	KUW	AHE	VB
(Saudi Arabia) Al-Ettifaq	6	4	2	0	18	7	+11	14		2–2	0–0	2–0
Al-Kuwait	6	3	2	1	17	10	+7	11	1–5		1–0	7–1
(Lebanon) Al-Ahed	6	2	1	3	7	11	−4	7	1–3	0–4		5–3
(Maldives) VB	6	0	1	5	9	23	−14	1	3–6	2–2	0–1	

Legend: Blue = home team win; Yellow = draw; Red = away team win.

=== Group D ===
Team	Pld	W	D	L	GF	GA	GD	Pts	WEH	NEF	ORU	SAL
(Jordan) Al-Wehdat	6	4	0	2	15	9	+6	12		3–1	2–1	5–0
(Uzbekistan) Neftchi Farg'ona	6	3	2	1	11	7	+4	11	2–1		3–1	3–0
(Oman) Al-Orouba	6	2	1	3	8	10	−2	7	4–2	0–0		1–0
(India) Salgaocar	6	1	1	4	6	14	−8	4	1–2	2–2	3–1	

Legend: Blue = home team win; Yellow = draw; Red = away team win.

=== Group E ===
Team	Pld	W	D	L	GF	GA	GD	Pts	SHO	ZAW	SAF	TIL
(Syria) Al-Shorta	6	5	0	1	14	6	+8	15		3–2	3–2	3–0
(Iraq) Al-Zawra'a	6	4	0	2	12	5	+7	12	2–1		1–0	5–0
(Lebanon) Safa	6	3	0	3	6	7	−1	9	0–2	1–0		1–0
(Yemen) Al-Tilal	6	0	0	6	1	15	−14	0	0–2	0–2	1–2	

Legend: Blue = home team win; Yellow = draw; Red = away team win.

=== Group F ===
Team	Pld	W	D	L	GF	GA	GD	Pts	KIT	TER	SNA	TAM
(Hong Kong) Kitchee	6	3	2	1	9	4	+5	11		2–2	2–0	3–1
(Malaysia) Terengganu	6	3	1	2	10	8	+2	10	0–2		6–2	0–2
(Vietnam) Sông Lam Nghệ An	6	2	1	3	6	9	−3	7	1–0	0–1		3–0
(Singapore) Tampines Rovers	6	1	2	3	3	7	−4	5	0–0	0–1	0–0	

Legend: Blue = home team win; Yellow = draw; Red = away team win.

=== Group G ===
Team	Pld	W	D	L	GF	GA	GD	Pts	CHO	HOM	CIT	YAN
(Thailand) Chonburi	6	4	2	0	10	5	+5	14		1–0	2–0	1–0
(Singapore) Home United	6	3	1	2	9	6	+3	10	1–2		3–1	3–1
(Hong Kong) Citizen	6	2	1	3	9	12	−3	7	3–3	1–2		2–1
(Myanmar) Yangon United	6	0	2	4	4	9	−5	2	1–1	0–0	1–2	

Legend: Blue = home team win; Yellow = draw; Red = away team win.

=== Group H ===
Team	Pld	W	D	L	GF	GA	GD	Pts	KEL	ARE	NVB	AYE
(Malaysia) Kelantan	6	4	1	1	10	5	+5	13		3–0	0–0	1–0
(Indonesia) Arema	6	2	1	3	12	12	0	7 (Note: Tiebreakers: Arema, Navibank Sài Gòn and Ayeyawady United are ranked by their head-to-head record (Arema: 7 pts; Navibank Sài Gòn: 6 pts; Ayeyawady United: 4 pts).)	1–3		6–2	1–1
(Vietnam) Navibank Sài Gòn	6	2	1	3	10	12	−2	7	1–2	3–1		4–1
(Myanmar) Ayeyawady United	6	2	1	3	7	10	−3	7	3–1	0–3	2–0	

Legend: Blue = home team win; Yellow = draw; Red = away team win.

== Knockout stage ==
=== Round of 16 ===
The matchups for the round of 16 were decided based on the results from the group stage. Each tie was played as one match, hosted by the winners of each group (Team 1) against the runners-up of another group (Team 2).

Team 1	Score	Team 2
Al-Qadsia (Kuwait)	1–1 (a.e.t.) (1–3 p)	Al-Kuwait
Al-Ettifaq (Saudi Arabia)	1–0	(Oman) Al-Suwaiq
Erbil (Iraq)	4–0	(Uzbekistan) Neftchi Farg'ona
Al-Wehdat (Jordan)	2–1 (a.e.t.)	(Kuwait) Kazma
Al-Shorta (Syria)	3–0	(Singapore) Home United
Chonburi (Thailand)	1–0	(Iraq) Al-Zawra'a
Kitchee (Hong Kong)	0–2	(Indonesia) Arema
Kelantan (Malaysia)	3–2	(Malaysia) Terengganu

=== Quarter-finals ===
The draw for the quarter-finals, semi-finals, and final was held in Kuala Lumpur, Malaysia on 14 June 2012. It determined the matchups for the quarter-finals and semi-finals as well as the potential host for the final.

Team 1	Agg.	Team 2	1st leg	2nd leg
Al-Kuwait	3–0	(Jordan) Al-Wehdat	0–0	3–0
Arema (Indonesia)	0–4	(Saudi Arabia) Al-Ettifaq	0–2	0–2
Erbil (Iraq)	6–2	(Malaysia) Kelantan	5–1	1–1
Chonburi (Thailand)	5–4	(Syria) Al-Shorta	1–2	4–2 (a.e.t.)

=== Semi-finals ===
Team 1	Agg.	Team 2	1st leg	2nd leg
Al-Kuwait	6–1	(Saudi Arabia) Al-Ettifaq	4–1	2–0
Erbil (Iraq)	8–2	(Thailand) Chonburi	4–1	4–1

=== Final ===
The final of the 2012 AFC Cup was hosted by one of the finalists, decided by a draw. According to the draw on 14 June 2012, the winner of semi-final 2 would host the final. Therefore, Erbil was the home team.

3 November 2012
17:00 UTC+03:00

Erbil (Iraq)	0–4	Al-Kuwait
	Report	Hammami 3' (pen.), 90'; Rogerinho 42'; Khamis 83'

Franso Hariri Stadium, Erbil
Attendance: 30,000
Referee: Valentin Kovalenko (Uzbekistan)

2012 AFC Cup

Al-Kuwait
2nd Title

== Top scorers ==
Rank	Player	Club	MD1	MD2	MD3	MD4	MD5	MD6	R16	QF1	QF2	SF1	SF2	F	Total
1	(Iraq) Amjad Radhi	(Iraq) Erbil		1	1			1	1	1		2	2		9
1	(Syria) Raja Rafe	(Syria) Al-Shorta	2	2	1		1	2	1						9
3	(Lebanon) Mohammed Ghaddar	(Malaysia) Kelantan		1	3	2	1				1				8
3	(Argentina) Sebastián Tagliabué	(Saudi Arabia) Al-Ettifaq	3		3		2								8
3	(Colombia) Edison Fonseca	(Vietnam) Navibank Sài Gòn		3	3		1	1							8
6	(Brazil) Rogerinho	Al-Kuwait	1		1			1	1		1		1	1	7
7	(Jordan) Mahmoud Shelbaieh	(Jordan) Al-Wehdat	1	1	1	1	2								6
7	(Kuwait) Abdulhadi Khamis	Al-Kuwait		1	2			1					1	1	6
9	(Jordan) Ahmed Hayel	(Jordan) Al-Faisaly			1	1	2	1							5
9	(Kuwait) Yousef Nasser	(Kuwait) Kazma		1	1	1	1		1						5
9	(Thailand) Pipob On-Mo	(Thailand) Chonburi				1		1	1		1	1			5

Note: Goals scored in qualifying play-off not counted.

== See also ==
- 2012 AFC Champions League
- 2012 AFC President's Cup
