= 2012 AFC Cup qualifying play-off =

The 2012 AFC Cup qualifying play-off was contested by two teams (both from West Asia Zone).

The draw for the qualifying play-off was held at the AFC house in Kuala Lumpur, Malaysia on 6 December 2011, 15:00 UTC+08:00. The draw determined the host of the play-off match, which was played on 18 February 2012.

Extra time and penalty shootout would be used to decide the winner if necessary. The winner advanced to the group stage to join the 28 teams which directly entered the group stage and the 3 losers of the 2012 AFC Champions League qualifying play-off final round.

== Matches ==
Team 1	Score	Team 2
West Asia Zone
Victory (Maldives)	3–4^{1}	(Yemen) Al-Tilal

Notes

- Note 1: Due to the political crisis in Yemen, the AFC decided to switch the venue from Aden, Yemen to Malé, Maldives.

=== West Asia Zone ===
18 February 2012
16:00 UTC+05:00

Victory (Maldives)	3–4	(Yemen) Al-Tilal
Umair 36' (pen.), 59' (pen.); Shafiu 50'	Report	Baleid 23' (pen.); Ramzi 32'; Al Omzae 45+4'; Al Roatde 77'

Rasmee Dhandu Stadium, Malé
Attendance: 2,500
Referee: Saeid Mozaffarizadeh (Iran)

=== East Asia Zone ===
The following two teams were originally slated to enter the qualifying play-off in the East Asia Zone:

- (Malaysia) Terengganu
- (Myanmar) Ayeyawady United

After the withdrawal of Liaoning Whowin and disqualification of Persipura Jayapura from the 2012 AFC Champions League qualifying play-off East Asia Zone, only three teams were left, meaning only one final round loser would enter the AFC Cup in the East Asia Zone instead of two. As a result, no qualifying play-off was necessary for the East Asia Zone and both Terengganu and Ayeyawady United automatically advanced to the group stage. Persipura Jayapura were later provisionally reinstated to the 2012 AFC Champions League, but the AFC decided that the loser of the qualifying play-off match between Adelaide United and Persipura Jayapura would not advance to the 2012 AFC Cup group stage.
