= Issa Al-Sabah =

Jordanian footballer

Personal information
- Date of birth: 25 December 1986 (age 39)
- Place of birth: Saudi Arabia
- Position: Winger

Senior career*
Years	Team	Apps	(Gls)
2005–2013	Al-Wehdat		
2013–2014	Shabab Al-Ordon		
2014–2015	Al Nahda		
2015–2016	Al-Jeel		
2016–2017	Al-Tai		
2017	Al-Yarmouk		
2017–2018	Al-Nahda		
2018	Al-Ramtha		
2018–2024	Shabab Al-Aqaba		

International career
2007–2008	Jordan U-23		(3)
2007-2014	Jordan	2	(0)
- * Club domestic league appearances and goals

Issa Al-Sabah (Arabic: عيسى السباح; born 25 December 1987) is a retired Jordanian footballer.

== Honors and Participation in International Tournaments ==
=== In Asian Games ===
- 2006 Asian Games

== International goals ==
#	Date	Venue	Opponent	Score	Result	Competition
1	24 November 2006	Al-Wakrah	Macau	13–0	Win	Football at the 2006 Asian Games
2	24 November 2006	Al-Wakrah	Macau	13–0	Win	Football at the 2006 Asian Games
3	16 May 2007	Dammam	Saudi Arabia	1–4	Loss	2008 AFC Men's Pre-Olympic Tournament
