= Valentin Kovalenko =

Uzbekistani football referee

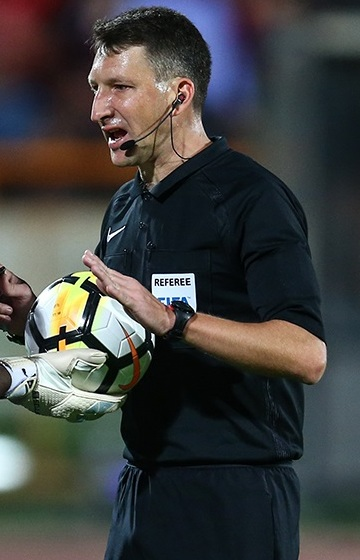
- Kovalenko refereeing at Azadi Stadium in ACL 2018.
- Full name: Valentin Anatolyevich Kovalenko
- Born: 9 August 1975 (age 51); Tashkent, Uzbek SSR, Soviet Union

Domestic
Years	League	Role
2000–	Uzbekistan Super League	Referee

International
Years	League	Role
2002–	FIFA listed	Referee

Valentin Kovalenko (born 9 August 1975) is an Uzbek professional football referee of Ukrainian and Russian origin. He referees in the Uzbekistan Super League and Uzbekistan Cup.

He refereed at the 2008 AFC Challenge Cup final, 2011 AFC Asian Cup, 2012 AFC Cup Final and 2014 World Cup qualifiers, beginning with the preliminary-round match between Iraq and Yemen. During 2006 World Cup qualifying, he also served as an assistant referee.

== AFC Asian Cup ==
2019 AFC Asian Cup – United Arab Emirates
Date	Match	Venue	Round
11 January 2019	Palestine – Australia	Dubai	Group stage

Preceded by (South Korea) Kim Dong Jin	AFC Cup final match referees 2012 (Uzbekistan) Valentin Kovalenko	Succeeded by (Singapore) Abdul Malik Abdul Bashir
