= Sula Matovu =

Ugandan footballer (born 1992)

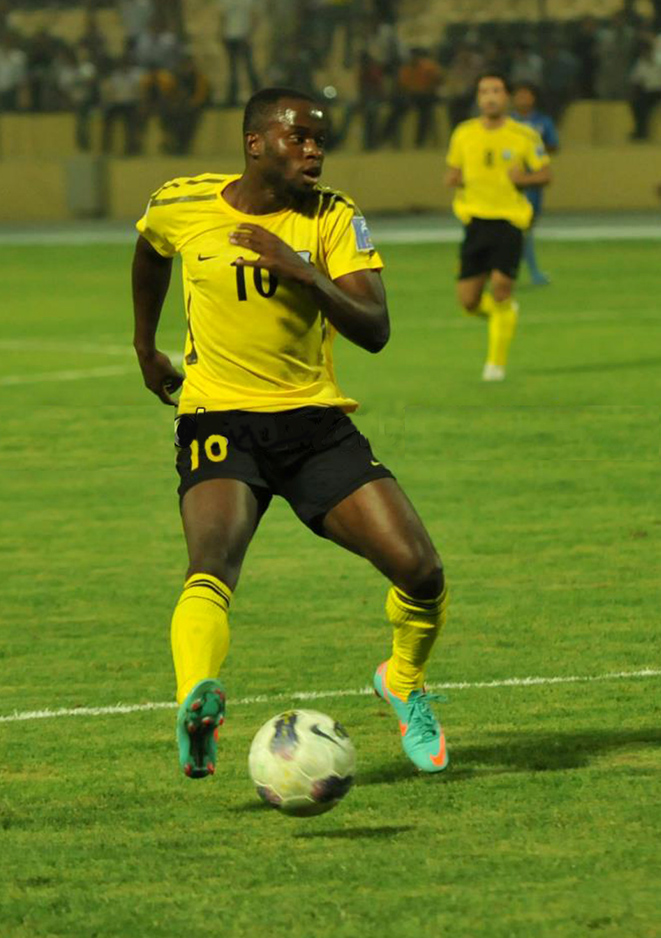
- Matovu Sula in Action for Erbil S.C in 2012

Personal information
- Full name: Sula Matovu
- Date of birth: 17 July 1992 (age 34)
- Place of birth: Mulago, Uganda
- Height: 1.70 m (5 ft 7 in)
- Positions: Striker; midfielder

Team information
- Current team: Mirbat

Youth career
- Proline Soccer Academy

Senior career*
Years	Team	Apps	(Gls)
2009–2010	Nalubaale Buikwe	27	(18)
2010–2011	Proline FC	19	(13)
2011–2012	→ Saint George (loan)	28	(12)
2012–2013	Erbil	13	(9)
2012–2013	→ Al Sulumaniya (loan)	10	(3)
2014–2015	Häcken	0	(0)
2015	Najaf	16	(7)
2015–2016	Kaizer Chiefs	5	(0)
2017	Royal Eagles		
2017–2018	Proline		
2018–2019	Mirbat		
2019–2021	Al-Orouba		
2021	Bahla		
2021—	Mirbat		

International career
2010–2014	Uganda	14	(2)
- * Club domestic league appearances and goals as of 22:42, 6 October 2019 (UTC)

Sula Matovu (born 17 July 1992) is a Ugandan soccer player, who plays as a striker and midfielder for Mirbat SC in the Oman Professional League and the Ugandan national team.

== Club career ==
=== Early career ===
Matovu started his playing career while still in school before joining Proline FC soccer academy in 2007. While at the academy he showed remarkable ability and great performance and joined Nalubaale Buikwe in Uganda Super League. After one season he joined Proline FC where he scored regularly in Uganda Super League due to his great technique, burst of speed as he takes off opponents, accurate shooting and ball crossing, good and close ball control, dribbling and passing as well as nice displays in soccer matches enticed the Uganda national football team coach Bobby Williamson who called him for Uganda national football team. He has also featured for U20 Uganda national football team and U23 Uganda national football team.

=== Saint George F.C (Loan) ===
In January 2011, Matovu moved to Ethiopian club Saint George F.C. coached by Giuseppe Dossena on a 6 months loan deal.

=== Erbil SC ===
In August 2012, Matovu completed a one-year move to Erbil SC. Matovu made his Erbil S.C debut after coming as a substitute in the 76th min in a 5–1 win over Malaysian Kelantan F.C in the Asian Quarter Final 1st Leg in Erbil city on 18 September 2012. On 25 September 2012, in the 2nd Leg of Asian Quarter Final, Matovu scored his Erbil SC a debut goal in 37th min in a 1–1 draw with Kelantan ensuring Erbil S.C advance to the Asian Semi-finals. On 3 November 2012, he came as a substitute on the 46th min in the Asian Cup Final against Al Kuwait and Erbil S.C went on to lose 4–0. On 24 November 2012, Matovu scored his Iraq-Kurdish league debut goal in the 7th min in the 3–2 win over Al Sulimaniya.

=== BK Häcken ===
After an impressive season with Iraq side Erbil SC, Swedish Allsvenskan side BK Häcken invited him for 3 weeks trials where he impressed the technical team and becoming the fastest player in the club history and was signed. He scored his first goal for BK Häcken in a 3–1 win against FC Dallas in a preseason match.

=== Kaizer Chiefs ===
After spending 2014 with Swedish Allsvenskan side BK Häcken, he was linked with a move to South African Premier Soccer League side Kaizer Chiefs on 20 June 2015. He started training with Kaizer Chiefs on 24 June 2015 and later signed a six-month deal on the 8 July 2015. Sula Scored the fourth goal in 4–0 win against Volcan de Moroni of Comoros in 2016 CAF Champions League

== Career statistics ==
=== International ===
Appearances and goals by national team and year
National team	Year	Apps	Goals
Uganda	2010	8	2
Uganda	2011	5	0
Uganda	2012	–	
Uganda	2013	–	
Uganda	2014	1	0
Total		14	2

Scores and results list Uganda's goal tally first, score column indicates score after each Matovu goal.

List of international goals scored by Sula Matovu
No.	Date	Venue	Opponent	Score	Result	Competition
1	3 March 2010	CCM Kirumba Stadium, Mwanza, Tanzania	Tanzania	1–0	3–2	Friendly
2	12 December 2010	Benjamin Mkapa Stadium, Dar es Salaam, Tanzania	Ethiopia	4–3	3–3	2010 CECAFA Cup

== Honours ==
=== Club ===
Erbil SC

- AFC Cup Runners-up: 2012

St. George FC

- Ethiopian Premier League: 2011–12
- Ethiopian Cup: 2011

=== Country ===
Uganda

- CECAFA Cup: 2011

Uganda-U20

- CECAFA U-20 Championship: 2010
