= Nawaf Al-Mutairi (footballer, born 1982) =

Kuwaiti footballer

Personal information
- Full name: Nawaf Al-Mutairi
- Date of birth: September 28, 1982 (age 44)
- Place of birth: Kuwait
- Height: 1.67 m (5 ft 5 1/2 in)
- Position: Midfielder

Senior career*
Years	Team	Apps	(Gls)
2002–2014	Al-Qadisiya	?	(?)
2009–2010	→ Al-Salmiya (loan)	?	(?)
2014	Al Naser	12	(1)

International career^{‡}
2004–2007	Kuwait	30	(0)
- * Club domestic league appearances and goals as of December 10, 2014 ‡ National team caps and goals as of October 4, 2007

Nawaf Al-Mutairi (born September 28, 1982) is a Kuwaiti retired football player. Al-Mutairi was a midfielder in the national team, and also played in the Kuwaiti team Qadsia Sporting Club. He currently works as a Lieutenant colonel in the Kuwaiti Army.
