= Abdulaziz Al Salimi =

Kuwaiti footballer

Personal information
- Full name: Abdulaziz Badi' Saleh Al Salimi (Arabic:عبد العزيز بديع صالح السليمي)
- Date of birth: September 19, 1991 (age 35)
- Place of birth: Kuwait City, Kuwait
- Height: 1.78 m (5 ft 10 in)
- Position: Midfielder

Team information
- Current team: Al Arabi
- Number: 32

Youth career
- 2001–2010: Al Arabi

Senior career*
Years	Team	Apps	(Gls)
2010–	Al Arabi		
2018–2020	→ Al Fahaheel (loan)		

International career^{‡}
2003	Kuwait U13		
2005	Kuwait U15		
2009	Kuwait U19		
2012–2013	Kuwait	2	(1)
- * Club domestic league appearances and goals as of 16 October 2010 ‡ National team caps and goals as of 18 January 2013

Abdulaziz Al Salimi (Arabic: عبدالعزيز السليمي, born 29 September 1991) is a Kuwaiti footballer who is a midfielder for the Kuwaiti Premier League club Al Arabi.
