= Mladen Ristić =

Serbian footballer

Personal information
- Date of birth: 18 March 1982 (age 44)
- Place of birth: Niš, SFR Yugoslavia
- Height: 1.77 m (5 ft 9 1/2 in)
- Position: Midfielder

Youth career
- 1999-2000: Olympique Marseille
- 2000-2001: Bordeaux

Senior career*
Years	Team	Apps	(Gls)
2002–2004	Rad	10	(0)
2004	OFK Niš		
2005	Radnički Niš		
2005–2006	Jedinstvo Ub		
2006	Borac Čačak	9	(0)
2007	Javor		
2007	Radnički Pirot		
2008–2009	Sileks	34	(3)
2009–2010	Olimpik Sarajevo	12	(2)
2011-2013	Sloga Kraljevo	4	(0)
2012	→ Yangon United (loan)	7	(2)
2013-2020	OFK Mihajlovac		
- * Club domestic league appearances and goals

Mladen Ristić (Serbian Cyrillic: Младен Ристић; born 18 March 1982) is a Serbian retired football player.

== External sources ==
- Mladen Ristić at Soccerway (archived)
- Serbs star in Yangons afc.com
