= Waleed Khaled =

British journalist

Waleed Khaled was a journalist working for the Reuters news agency. He was shot and killed by American soldiers in Iraq on 28 August 2005. Khaled and a cameraman had gone to cover an incident in which two Iraqi policemen were killed in the Hay al-Adil district of Baghdad.

On 1 September, the chief military spokesman in Baghdad, Major General Rick Lynch, claimed soldiers had followed "established rules of engagement", going on to further claim they had acted in an "appropriate" manner when they opened fire. Gen. Lynch stated, "What our soldiers on the scene saw was a car travelling forward at a high rate of speed. [It] looked like cars that we have seen in the past used as suicide bombs . . . and there were two local nationals inside."

Reuters said Khaled had two press cards pinned to his chest at the time, one issued by the US Army and the other issued by the news agency.
