= Lê Thế Cường =

Vietnamese footballer (born 1990)

Personal information
- Full name: Lê Thế Cường
- Date of birth: December 14, 1990 (age 35)
- Place of birth: Vũ Quang, Hà Tĩnh, Vietnam
- Height: 1.68 m (5 ft 6 in)
- Position: Midfielder

Youth career
- 2003–2011: Sông Lam Nghệ An

Senior career*
Years	Team	Apps	(Gls)
2012–2015	Sông Lam Nghệ An	36	(6)
2015–2016	Cần Thơ	18	(5)
2016–2019	Sông Lam Nghệ An	23	(3)
2020–2021	Hải Phòng	26	(2)
- * Club domestic league appearances and goals as of 23 June 2018

Lê Thế Cường (born 14 December 1990) is a Vietnamese footballer who plays as a midfielder for V.League 1 club Hải Phòng.

In October 2016 Thế Cường joined Cần Thơ in a two-year deal worth more than 1 đồng. Thế Cường stated that his reason for leaving SLNA was because he wished to have more playing time.

However in December 2016 after a season of playing for Cần Thơ, Thế Cường signed a new three-year contract with his former club SNLA agreeing to rejoin them in the 2017 season.
