= Bahrain National Stadium =

Stadium in Riffa, Bahrain

Coordinates: 26°9′13″N 50°32′37″E

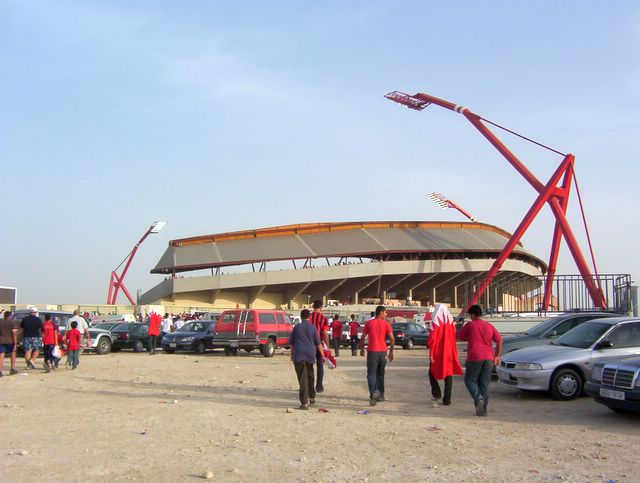
- Interactive map of Bahrain National Stadium
- Full name: Bahrain National Stadium
- Location: Riffa, Bahrain
- Capacity: 24,000
- Surface: Grass

Construction
- Built: 1981
- Opened: 1982
- Cost: $152 million

Tenants
- Bahrain national football team, Riffa S.C., Al Khaldiya

Bahrain National Stadium (Arabic: استاد البحرين الوطني; transliterated: Stād al-Bahrayn al-Watanī) is the national stadium of Bahrain, located in Riffa. It can accommodate 24,000 spectators and is used mostly for football matches.

It was built in 1982 and renovated in December 2012 for the 21st Arabian Gulf Cup.

Pope Francis held a holy papal mass on November 5, 2022, in the Bahrain National Stadium, which was temporarily refitted to accommodate the event. He was in the country on the invitation of the Bahraini king. The papal mass was attended by members of the public and was conducted in the presence of King Hamad bin Isa Alkhalifa. A temporary center-stage was set up in the stadium to host the Pope and the King during the mass. This marked the first time that a pope had conducted a mass in Bahrain. The event was widely publicized and covered by media outlets around the world. The papal mass was part of Pope Francis' efforts to promote interfaith dialogue and cooperation.
