= Hussain Ali Baba =

Bahraini footballer

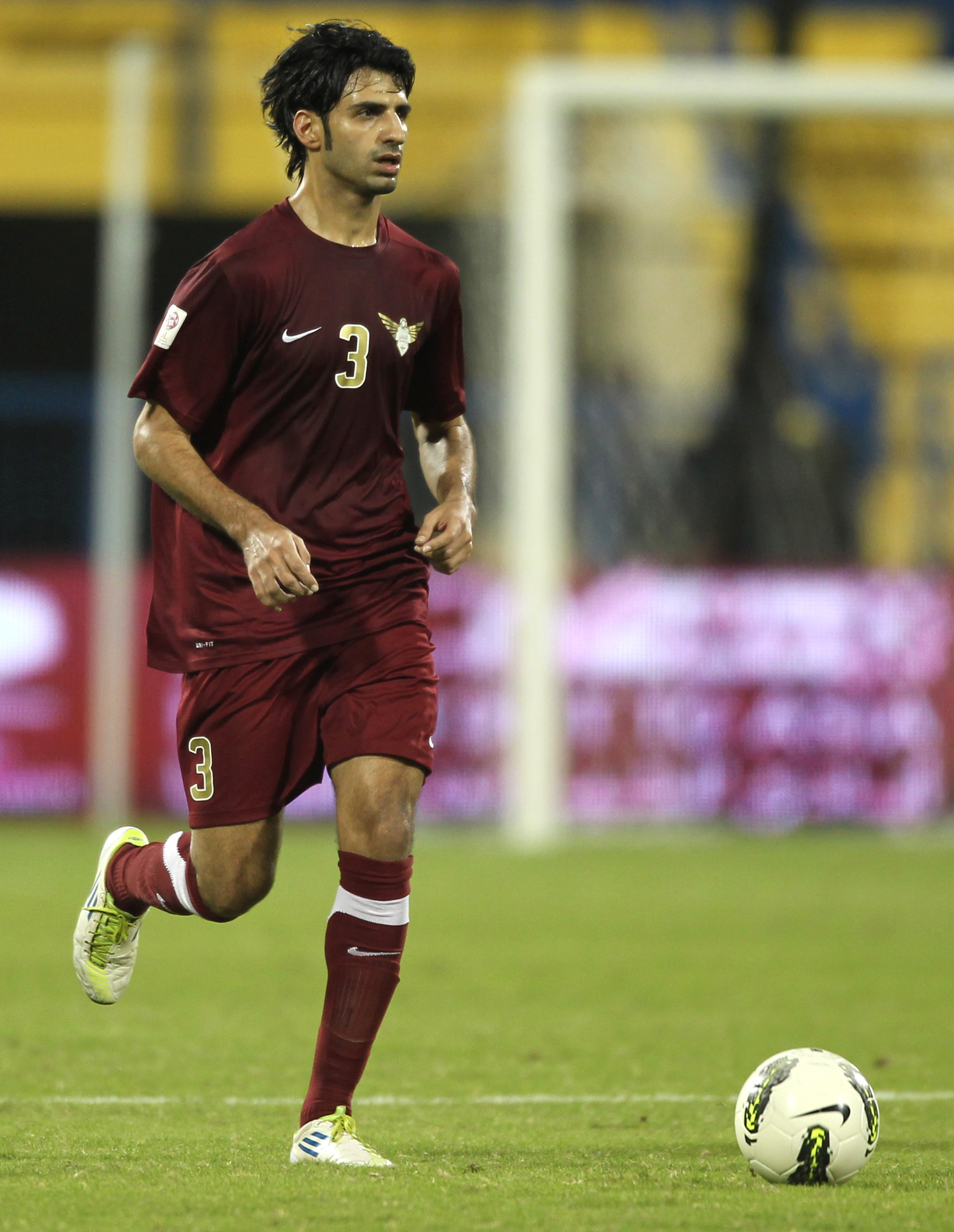
- Hussain Ali Baba in 2011

Personal information
- Full name: Hussain Ali Baba Mohammed
- Date of birth: 11 February 1982 (age 44)
- Place of birth: Manama, Bahrain
- Height: 1.84 m (6 ft 0 in)
- Position: Centre-back

Team information
- Current team: Al Riffa

Senior career*
Years	Team	Apps	(Gls)
2001–2004	Al Riffa	30	(6)
2004–2005	Al-Shamal	16	(0)
2005–2007	Kuwait SC	15	(1)
2007–2008	Al-Rayyan	13	(2)
2008	Umm-Salal	7	(0)
2009	Al-Salmiya	0	(0)
2009	Al-Shabab	1	(0)
2010–2011	Al-Wehda	8	(0)
2011–2012	El Jaish	2	(0)
2012–2013	Kuwait SC	17	(3)
2013–2015	Al-Muharraq	22	(4)
2015	Al-Fateh SC		
2016–2017	Al-Muharraq		
2017–2019	Al Riffa		
Total			(16)

International career^{‡}
2003–2016	Bahrain	112	(6)
- * Club domestic league appearances and goals as of 9 December 2014 (UTC) ‡ National team caps and goals as of 1 September 2016

Hussain Ali Baba Mohamed (Arabic: حسين علي بابا; born 11 February 1982) is a former Bahraini footballer who last played for Al Riffa and the Bahrain national football team.

== Career ==
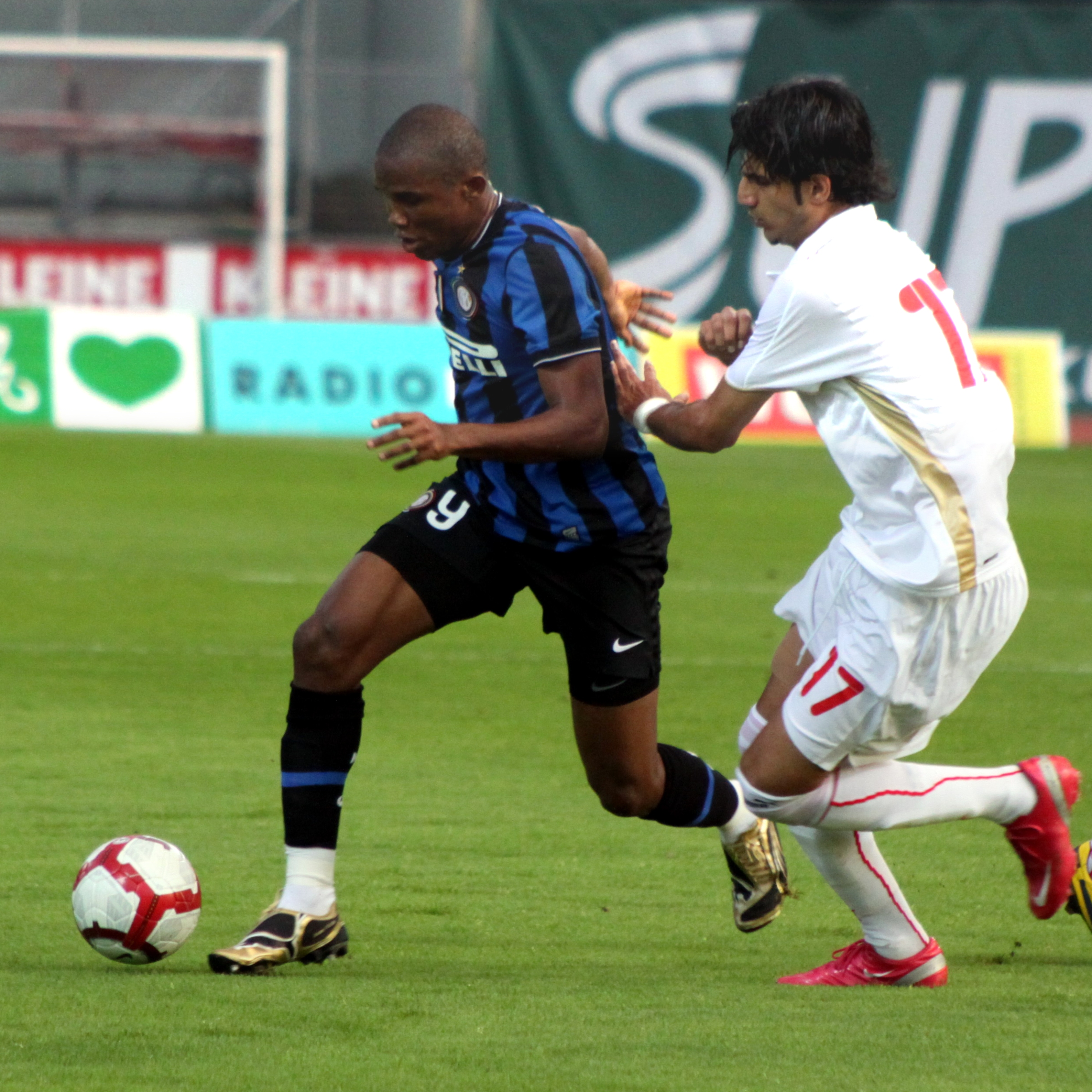
Hussain Ali Baba next to Samuel Eto'o during a friendly match between Bahrain and Inter Milan.

Baba first played for Al Riffa football club from 2003 to 2004 after which he switched to Qatar's Al-Shamal football club from 2004 till 2005. He then moved to Kuwait SC until 2007 when he joined Al-Rayyan football club, where he scored twice, until 2008. From 2008 to 2009, he joined and left three clubs; Umm-Salal in 2008, Al-Salmiya and Al-Shabab (UAE) clubs in 2009 respectively. In 2010, he joined Saudi Arabia's Al-Wehda club until 2011. Following this, he joined El Jaish for a single season until 2012. In 2012, he played for Kuwait SC.

=== International goals ===
Scores and results list Bahrain's goal tally first.

Goal	Date	Venue	Opponent	Score	Result	Competition
1.	18 December 2003	Bahrain National Stadium, Riffa, Bahrain	Kenya	2–1	2–1	International Tournament
2.	6 November 2009	Bahrain National Stadium, Riffa, Bahrain	Togo	4–1	5–1	Friendly
3.	16 October 2010	Zayed Sports City Stadium, Abu Dhabi, United Arab	United Arab Emirates	2–1	2–6	Friendly
4.	15 January 2013	Bahrain National Stadium, Riffa, Bahrain	Iraq	1–1	1–1	21st Arabian Gulf Cup
5.	2 November 2014	Bahrain National Stadium, Riffa, Bahrain	North Korea	2–1	2–2	Friendly
6.	8 September 2015	Grand Hamad Stadium, Doha, Qatar	Yemen	1–0	4–0	2018 FIFA World Cup qualification

== See also ==
- List of men's footballers with 100 or more international caps
