= Milan Jovanović (footballer, born October 1983) =

Serbian footballer

Personal information
- Full name: Milan Jovanović
- Date of birth: 14 October 1983 (age 43)
- Place of birth: Niš, SR Serbia, SFR Yugoslavia
- Height: 1.87 m (6 ft 1 1/2 in)
- Position: Striker

Youth career
- 2001–2002: OFK Niš

Senior career*
Years	Team	Apps	(Gls)
2002–2005	OFK Niš		
2002–2003	→ Žitorađa (loan)	23	(2)
2003	→ Metalac GM (loan)	11	(0)
2004	→ Car Konstantin (loan)	0	(0)
2004–2005	OFK Niš	3	(1)
2005–2006	Vlasina	32	(9)
2006–2007	Radnički Niš	18	(0)
2007	→ Radnički Pirot (loan)	17	(6)
2007–2010	Rad	45	(6)
2010	Taraz	32	(7)
2010–2011	BSK Borča	11	(2)
2011	Sinđelić Niš	11	(3)
2012	Yangon United		
2012–2013	Radnički Niš	18	(3)
2013	Tirana	2	(0)
2014	Sloga Kraljevo	14	(5)
2014	Bregalnica Štip	8	(0)
- * Club domestic league appearances and goals as of 1 August 2014

Milan Jovanović (Serbian Cyrillic: Милан Јовановић; born 14 October 1983) is a Serbian football striker.
