= Abdulhadi Khamis =

Kuwaiti footballer

Personal information
- Full name: Abdulhadi Khamis Khudair
- Date of birth: 19 December 1990 (age 35)
- Place of birth: Kuwait City, Kuwait
- Height: 1.72 m (5 ft 8 in)
- Position: Forward

Senior career*
Years	Team	Apps	(Gls)
2007–2008	Al Shabab	18	(5)
2008–2022	Al-Kuwait		
2018–2019	→ Al Fahaheel (loan)		
2019–2022	→ Al Shabab (loan)		
2022–2023	Al-Salmiya		
2023–2024	Al-Qadsia		

International career^{‡}
2010–2011	Kuwait U23		
2012–2013	Kuwait	8	(5)
- * Club domestic league appearances and goals as of 21 November 2022 ‡ National team caps and goals as of 18 January 2013

Abdulhadi Khamis (Arabic: عبد الهادي خميس خضير, born 19 December 1990) is a Kuwaiti footballer who plays as a forward.

== International goals ==
Scores and results list Kuwait's goal tally first.

#	Date	Venue	Opponent	Score	Result	Competition
1	25 June 2012	King Fahd Stadium, Taif	Palestine	2–0	Won	2012 Arab Cup
2	14 December 2012	Al-Sadaqua Walsalam Stadium, Kuwait City	Lebanon	2–1	Won	2012 WAFF Championship
3	18 January 2013	Bahrain National Stadium, Riffa	Bahrain	6–1	Won	21st Arabian Gulf Cup
4	18 January 2013	Bahrain National Stadium, Riffa	Bahrain	6–1	Won	21st Arabian Gulf Cup
5	18 January 2013	Bahrain National Stadium, Riffa	Bahrain	6–1	Won	21st Arabian Gulf Cup
