= Chadi Hammami =

Tunisian footballer

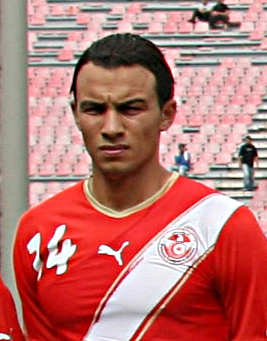

Personal information
- Full name: Chadi Bin Al Basheer Hammami
- Date of birth: 14 June 1986 (age 40)
- Place of birth: Sfax, Tunisia
- Height: 1.81 m (5 ft 11 in)
- Position: Midfielder

Senior career*
Years	Team	Apps	(Gls)
2005–2012	CS Sfaxien		
2012–2016	Al-Kuwait		
2016–2017	Dubai Club	21	(4)
2017–2018	Dibba Al-Hisn	20	(4)
2019–2020	Al-Fahaheel		
2020–2024	CS Sfaxien		

International career
2007–2014	Tunisia	25	(1)
- * Club domestic league appearances and goals

Chadi Bin Al Basheer Hammami (born 14 June 1986) is a Tunisian retired international footballer who played as a midfielder, mostly for CS Sfaxien.

== Club career ==
Born in Sfax, Hammami has played for CS Sfaxien and Al-Kuwait. On 15 May 2016, he signed a contract with Dubai Club for one season. On 27 September, he signed a contract with Dibba Al-Hisn for one season. He then played in Kuwait with Al-Fahaheel before returning to CS Sfaxien.

== International career ==
Hammami made his international debut for Tunisia in 2007, and represented them at the Africa Cup of Nations in 2010 and 2013. He has also appeared in FIFA World Cup qualifying matches. His last appearance for the national team was in 2014.
