= Franso Hariri Stadium =

Stadium in Erbil, Kurdistan Region, Iraq

Franso Hariri Stadium ملعب فرانسوا حريري یاریگای فرانسۆ ھەریری Yarîgay Franso Herîrî
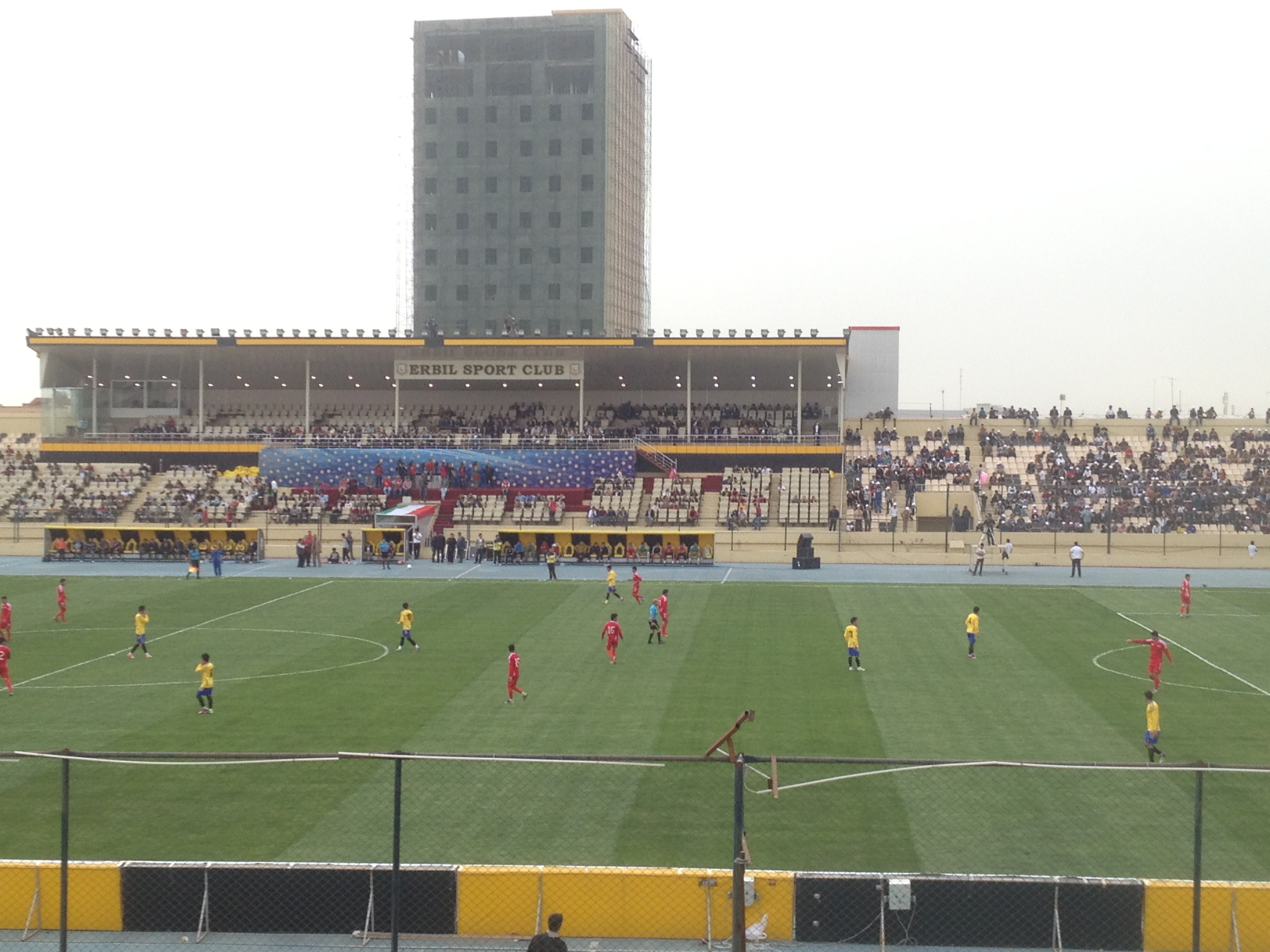
- Franso Hariri Stadium in 2013
- Interactive map of Franso Hariri Stadium ملعب فرانسوا حريري یاریگای فرانسۆ ھەریری; Yarîgay Franso Herîrî
- Full name: Franso Hariri Stadium
- Former names: Erbil Stadium
- Location: Erbil, Kurdistan Region, Iraq
- Coordinates: 36°10′21″N 44°00′41″E
- Capacity: 25,000
- Surface: Grass
- Scoreboard: Yes
- Field size: 105 m × 68 m

Construction
- Opened: 1956
- Renovated: 1992

Tenants
- Iraq national football team (selected matches); Erbil SC

Franso Hariri Stadium (Kurdish: یاریگای فرانسۆ ھەریری, Yarîgay Franso Herîrî; Arabic: ملعب فرانسوا حريري) is a multi-purpose stadium in Erbil, Kurdistan Region, Iraq. It is currently used mostly for football matches by Erbil SC who plays in the Iraqi Premier League. The stadium also has facilities for athletics. The stadium has a capacity of 25,000. It was built on an old airfield in 1956 and was redeveloped in 1992. The stadium was home to the old Brusk club (renamed Shortat Erbil) and was named Erbil Stadium until 2001. It was renamed the Martyr Franso Hariri Stadium in honor of the assassinated Christian governor Franso Hariri, who supported efforts to renovate the stadium.

On 23 February 2022, an all-star line-up of football legends including Brazil's Roberto Carlos and Barcelona striker Patrick Kluivert participated in a historic exhibition match at Franso Hariri stadium against Iraqi national team stars who won the 2007 AFC Asian Cup including Noor Sabri, Mahdi Karim and Ahmed Mnajed.

== FIFA ban on Iraq ==
Due to the relative stability of the region, Iraqi authorities used the stadium to remove the ban imposed on Iraq by FIFA and the Asian Football Confederation. In July 2009 Franso Hariri Stadium was given the green light to host matches in the AFC Cup, making it the first time a competitive match was allowed to be hosted on Iraqi soil since 2003. On 23 July 2011, Iraq played a FIFA World Cup qualifier on home ground for the first time since 2001, defeating Yemen by 2–0 at Franso Hariri Stadium. However, FIFA re-imposed the ban on 23 September due a breach of safety regulations in the qualifying match with Jordan.

== Notable events ==
- 2012 – AFC Cup Final
- 2019 – West Asian Football Federation Championship

== See also ==
- List of football stadiums in Iraq
- Duhok Stadium
