= List of Malaysia Premier League seasons =

== Season 2004 ==
The Liga Premier champions for 2004 were MPPJ FC (Selangor). They were promoted to Super League Malaysia 2005 along with runners-up Melaka TMFC.

Group A

Pos	Teams	Pld	W	D	L	F	A	GD	Pts
1	(Malacca) Melaka TMFC	24	17	1	6	41	24	+17	52
2	Selangor FA	24	16	2	6	52	35	+17	50
3	Johor FC	24	14	5	5	43	25	+18	47
4	(Selangor) PKNS FC	24	13	4	7	47	35	+12	43
5	(Kelantan) TNB FC	24	11	3	10	32	27	+5	36
6	(Selangor) PDRM FA	24	7	7	10	34	44	-10	28
7	Brunei	24	8	2	14	48	49	-1	26
8	(Federal Territories of Malaysia) ATM FA	24	7	2	15	37	49	-12	23
9	(Kelantan) JPS FC	24	2	0	22	27	73	-46	6

Pld = Matches played; W = Matches won; D = Matches drawn; L = Matches lost; F = Goals for; A = Goals against; GD = Goal difference; Pts = Points

Group B

Pos	Teams	Pld	W	D	L	F	A	GD	Pts
1	(Selangor) MPPJ FC	24	13	6	5	49	28	+21	45
2	(Selangor) MK Land FC	24	13	3	8	42	31	+11	42
3	(Federal Territories of Malaysia) Kuala Lumpur FA	24	10	8	6	44	33	+11	38
4	Negeri Sembilan FA	24	10	8	6	45	35	+10	38
5	Terengganu FA	24	8	11	5	33	27	+6	35
6	Johor FA	24	8	8	8	30	31	-1	32
7	Malacca FA	24	6	9	9	32	38	-6	27
8	(Kelantan) SKMK FC	24	8	2	14	24	47	-23	26
9	Kelantan FA	24	1	7	16	13	42	-29	10

Pld = Matches played; W = Matches won; D = Matches drawn; L = Matches lost; F = Goals for; A = Goals against; GD = Goal difference; Pts = Points

Key to colours in league table
Champion and promoted to Super League Malaysia
Relegated to Malaysia FAM Cup

=== Goalscorers ===
Position	Players	Teams	Goals
1	(Argentina) Brian Diego Fuentes	Selangor FA	25
2	(Brazil) Marcelo Padilha da Rocha	(Federal Territories of Malaysia) Kuala Lumpur FA	23
3	(Saint Vincent and the Grenadines) Marlon Alex James	(Selangor) MK Land FC	19
4	(Argentina) Walter Ariel Silva	Johor FC	18
5	(Argentina) Juan Arostegui	(Selangor) MPPJ FC	16
6	(Malaysia) Nazzab Hidzan	(Malacca) Melaka TMFC	13
7	(Ghana) David Anas (Serbia) Sasa Brenezac	(Selangor) PDRM FA (Selangor) MPPJ FC	12
9	(Malaysia) Shahrin Abdul Majid (Brazil) Liberto Silas	Negeri Sembilan FA; Brunei Darussalam	11
11	(Togo) Alfa Fotowabawi (Slovenia) Emir Dzafic (Slovakia) Roman Chmelo (Malaysia) S. Sunder (Thailand) Saranuwat Nasartsang	Terengganu FA; Malacca FA (Selangor) PKNS FC; Kuala Lumpur FA (Kelantan) SKMK FC	10

== Season 2005 ==
The Liga Premier champions for 2005 were Selangor FA. They were promoted to Super League Malaysia 2005-06 along with runners-up Negeri Sembilan FA.

Group A

Pos	Teams	Pld	W	D	L	F	A	GD	Pts
1	Selangor FA	21	16	3	2	61	25	+36	51
2	Kedah FA	21	13	7	1	44	11	+33	46
3	(Selangor) MK Land FC	21	14	4	3	61	29	+32	46
4	(Federal Territories of Malaysia) Kuala Lumpur FA	21	8	7	6	34	30	+4	31
5	Brunei	21	6	3	12	29	43	-14	21
6	(Penang) Suria Nibong Tebal FC	21	4	5	12	27	51	-24	17
7	(Kelantan) TNB FC	21	4	2	15	28	62	-34	14
8	Malacca FA	21	3	1	17	17	50	-33	10

Pld = Matches played; W = Matches won; D = Matches drawn; L = Matches lost; F = Goals for; A = Goals against; GD = Goal difference; Pts = Points

Group B

Pos	Teams	Pld	W	D	L	F	A	GD	Pts
1	Negeri Sembilan FA	21	16	1	4	45	19	+26	49
2	Terengganu FA	21	13	4	4	34	18	+16	43
3	(Selangor) PKNS FC	21	13	2	6	46	25	+21	41
4	Johor FC	21	10	6	5	27	16	+11	36
5	(Perak) Jenderata FC	21	7	5	9	20	32	-12	26
6	Johor FA	21	6	2	13	18	29	-11	20
7	Sarawak FA	21	3	5	13	23	38	-15	14
8	(Selangor) PDRM FA	21	2	3	16	15	51	-36	9

Pld = Matches played; W = Matches won; D = Matches drawn; L = Matches lost; F = Goals for; A = Goals against; GD = Goal difference; Pts = Points

Key to colours in league table
Champion and promoted to Super League Malaysia
Relegated to Malaysia FAM Cup

Note:

- Due to exclusion of Public Bank FC (Selangor) (relegated from Super League Malaysia) and MK Land FC (Selangor), who were suspended for 5 years from all competitions due to pulling out of the M-League, the relegations of Malacca FA and PDRM FA were revoked and both teams remained in the Liga Premier for 2005/2006 season.
- For the 2005/2006 season, the Football Association of Brunei entered a club team, DPMM FC (Duli Pengiran Muda Mahkota FC), rather than the Brunei M-League Team (as until now).

=== Goalscorers ===
Position	Players	Clubs	Goals
1	(Indonesia) Bambang Pamungkas	Selangor FA	23
2	(Saint Vincent and the Grenadines) Marlon Alex James	(Selangor) MK Land FC	22
3	(Argentina) Brian Diego Fuentes	Selangor FA	17
4	(Cameroon) Christian Bekamenga	Negeri Sembilan FA	16
5	(Slovakia) Roman Chmelo (Malaysia) Rudie Ramli	(Selangor) PKNS FC (Selangor) PKNS FC	13
7	(Slovakia) Miloslav Toth	(Selangor) MK Land FC	13
8	(Nigeria) Peter Uademebuo (Malaysia) Rosli Azizan	(Perak) Jenderata FC (Penang) Suria NTFA	10
10	(Malaysia) Muhamad Khalid Jamlus	Selangor FA	9

== Season 2005–06 ==
The Liga Premier champions for 2005–06 were Kedah FA. They were promoted to Super League Malaysia 2006–07 along with runners-up Malacca FA.

Group A

Pos	Teams/Clubs	Pld	W	D	L	F	A	GD	Pts
1	Kedah FA	21	13	3	5	39	22	17	42
2	Terengganu FA	21	12	5	4	47	21	26	41
3	(Brunei) DPMM FC (Duli Pengiran Muda Mahkota FC)	21	9	5	7	38	32	6	32
4	Sarawak FA	21	8	6	7	40	39	1	30
5	Johor FA	21	8	4	9	22	24	-2	28
6	Kelantan FA	21	7	5	9	29	36	-7	26
7	Perak UPB FC	21	13	6	11	43	44	-1	19
8	(Penang) Suria NTFA	21	3	6	12	16	42	-26	15

Pld = Matches played; W = Matches won; D = Matches drawn; L = Matches lost; F = Goals for; A = Goals against; GD = Goal difference; Pts = Points

Group B

Pos	Teams/Clubs	Pld	W	D	L	F	A	GD	Pts
1	Malacca FA	21	13	3	5	39	22	17	42
2	(Selangor) PKNS FC	21	12	5	4	47	21	26	41
3	Johor FC	21	9	5	7	38	32	6	32
4	Sabah FA	21	16	6	8	44	19	25	54
5	(Federal Territories of Malaysia) Kuala Lumpur FA	21	14	5	11	36	39	-3	47
6	(Selangor) PDRM FA	21	12	10	8	38	26	12	46
7	(Pahang) Shahzan Muda FC	21	13	6	11	43	44	-1	45
8	(Kelantan) TNB FC	21	13	5	12	43	38	5	44

Pld = Matches played; W = Matches won; D = Matches drawn; L = Matches lost; F = Goals for; A = Goals against; GD = Goal difference; Pts = Points

Key to colours in league table
Champion and promoted to Super League Malaysia
Relegated to Malaysia FAM Cup

Notes:

- At the end of the season Perak UPB merged with MyTeam to become UPB-MyTeam FC.

=== Goalscorers ===
Position	Players	Clubs	Goals
1	(Argentina) Gustavo Fuentes	Malacca FA	18

== Season 2006–07 ==
The 2006–07 Liga Premier season had eleven teams playing for promotion to the expanded Super League Malaysia. The teams were:

- (Federal Territories of Malaysia) ATM FA
- Johor FA
- Kelantan FA
- (Federal Territories of Malaysia) KL PLUS FC
- (Federal Territories of Malaysia) Kuala Lumpur FA
- (Kedah) Kuala Muda NAZA FC
- (Selangor) PDRM FA
- (Selangor) PKNS FC
- Sabah FA
- (Pahang) Shahzan Muda FC
- (Selangor) UPB-MyTeam FC

The champion and runner-up of Premier League Malaysia 2006–07 were PDRM FA and UPB-MyTeam FC respectively. Both teams were promoted to 2007–08 Malaysia Super League.

Pos	Club	Pld	W	D	L	F	A	GD	Pts
1	(Selangor) PDRM FA	20	14	2	4	40	25	+15	44
2	(Selangor) UPB-MyTeam FC	20	12	5	3	36	22	+14	41
3	(Selangor) PKNS FC	20	9	5	6	29	27	+2	32
4	Johor FA	20	8	6	6	33	22	+11	30
5	(Pahang) Shahzan Muda FC	20	7	7	6	28	24	+4	28
6	Sabah FA	20	6	9	5	26	21	+5	27
7	(Federal Territories of Malaysia) Kuala Lumpur FA	20	6	6	8	23	28	-5	24
8	Kelantan FA	20	4	8	8	23	31	-8	20
9	(Federal Territories of Malaysia) ATM FA	20	5	4	11	23	36	-13	19
10	(Kedah) Kuala Muda NAZA FC	20	4	6	10	18	26	-8	18
11	(Federal Territories of Malaysia) KL PLUS FC	20	4	4	12	26	41	-15	16

Pld = Matches played; W = Matches won; D = Matches drawn; L = Matches lost; F = Goals for; A = Goals against; GD = Goal difference; Pts = Points

Key to colours in league table
Champion and promoted to Super League Malaysia

- Note:- No relegations for this seasons because Premier League Malaysia was being expanded to 13 teams for the 2007–08 Malaysia Premier League.

=== Goalscorers ===
Position	Players	Teams	Goals
1	(Croatia) Marin Mikac	(Selangor) UPB-MyTeam FC	13

== Season 2007–08 ==
The 2007–08 Liga Premier season had 13 teams playing for promotion to the recently expanded Super League Malaysia. The teams were:

- (Federal Territories of Malaysia) ATM FA
- (Federal Territories of Malaysia) Felda United FC
- Johor FA
- Kelantan FA
- (Federal Territories of Malaysia) KL PLUS FC
- (Federal Territories of Malaysia) Kuala Lumpur FA
- (Kedah) Kuala Muda Naza FC
- Malacca FA
- Harimau Muda
- (Selangor) PKNS FC
- (Selangor) Proton FC
- Sabah FA
- (Pahang) Shahzan Muda FC

== See also ==
- Liga Premier
