= List of Malaysia football champions =

Football league competition in Malaysia began in 1982, with each state represented by its own teams competing in the Liga Malaysia. However, its purpose was only to serve as a qualifying round for the knockout stage of the Malaysia Cup. At that time, all states, in addition to the police and military teams, participated in this league, as well as Singapore and Brunei, which sent an amateur team to the competition.

Between 1989 and 1993, the Malaysian football league entered the semi-professional era with the establishment of the Liga Semi-Pro (MSPFL).

From 1994 to 1997, Malaysian football witnessed the establishment of the country's first professional football league, the Liga Perdana, in which all teams were classified into a single league.

In 1998, the league was split again with the creation of two divisions, Liga Perdana 1 and Liga Perdana 2, which operated until 2003.

The Malaysia Super League was introduced in 2004 to replace the previous top division as Malaysian football entered an era of football league privatization.

== Malaysian League (1982–1988) ==
Below are the list of the top division amateur league champions from the introduction of league trophy in 1982 to 1988.

Year	Champions (number of titles)	Runners-up	Third place	Leading goalscorer	Goals
1982	Penang	Federal Territory	Selangor		
1983	Malacca	Penang	Kelantan		
1984	Selangor	Pahang	Penang		
1985	Singapore	Johor	Pahang		
1986	Kuala Lumpur	Singapore	Selangor		
1987	Pahang	Kuala Lumpur	Singapore		
1988	Kuala Lumpur (2)	Singapore	Kelantan		

== Liga Semi-Pro Divisyen 1 (1989–1993) ==
Below are the list of the top division semi-pro league champions from 1989 to 1993.

Year	Champions (number of titles)	Runners-up	Third place	Leading goalscorer	Goals
1989	Selangor (2)	Kuala Lumpur	Kedah	Zainal Abidin Hassan (Selangor)	12
1990	Selangor (3)	Singapore	Perak	Alistair Edwards (Singapore)	13
1991	Johor	Pahang	Perak	Abbas Saad (Johor)	11
1992	Pahang (2)	Terengganu	Negeri Sembilan	Zainal Abidin Hassan (Pahang)	12
1993	Kedah	Sarawak	Perak	Mohd Hashim Mustapha (Kelantan)	13

== Liga Perdana (1994–1997) ==
Below are the list of the top division professional league champions from 1994 to 1997.

Year	Champions (number of titles)	Runners-up	Third place	Leading goalscorer	Goals
1994	Singapore (2)	Kedah	Sarawak	Mohd Hashim Mustapha (Kelantan)	25
1995	Pahang (3)	Selangor	Sarawak	Scott Ollerenshaw (Sabah)	22
1996	Sabah	Kedah	Negeri Sembilan	Scott Ollerenshaw (Sabah)	18
1997	Sarawak	Kedah	Sabah	Laszlo Repasi (Perak)	19

== Liga Perdana 1 (1998–2003) ==
Below are the list of the top division league champions from 1998 to 2003.

Year	Champions (number of titles)	Runners-up	Third place	Leading goalscorer	Goals
1998	Penang (2)	Pahang	Brunei	Vyacheslav Melnikov (Pahang)	17
1999	Pahang (4)	Penang	Negeri Sembilan	Azman Adnan (Penang)	13
2000	Selangor (4)	Penang	Perak	Azizul Kamaluddin (Pahang)	12
2001	Penang (3)	Terengganu	Kelantan	Norizam Ali Hassan (Perak)	13
2002	Perak	Selangor	Sabah	Muhamad Khalid Jamlus (Perak)	17
2003	Perak (2)	Kedah	Perlis	Phillimon Chepita (Perlis)	23

== Malaysia Super League (2004–present) ==
Below are the list of the top division league champions from 2004 to present.

Year	Champions (number of titles)	Runners-up	Third place	Leading goalscorer	Goals
2004	Pahang (5)	Public Bank	Perlis	Indra Putra Mahayuddin (Pahang)	15
2005	Perlis	Pahang	Perak	Júlio César Rodrigues (Sabah); Zachariah Simukonda (Perlis)	18
2005–06	Negeri Sembilan	Melaka TM	Perak	Keita Mandjou (Perak)	17
2006–07	**Kedah** (2)	Perak	DPMM	Keita Mandjou (Perak); Shahrazen Said (DPMM)	21
2007–08	**Kedah** (3)	Negeri Sembilan	Johor FC	Marlon Alex James (Kedah)	23
2009	Selangor (5)	Perlis	Kedah	Mohd Nizaruddin Yusof (Perlis)	18
2010	Selangor (6)	Kelantan	Terengganu	Mohd Ashaari Shamsuddin (Terengganu)	18
2011	Kelantan	Terengganu	Selangor	Abdul Hadi Yahya (Terengganu)	20
2012	**Kelantan** (2)	LionsXII	Selangor	Jean-Emmanuel Effa Owona (Negeri Sembilan); Francis Forkey Doe (Terengganu)	15
2013	LionsXII	Selangor	Johor Darul Ta'zim	Marlon Alex James (ATM)	16
2014	Johor Darul Ta'zim	Selangor	Pahang	Paulo Rangel (Selangor)	16
2015	Johor Darul Ta'zim (2)	Selangor	Pahang	Dramane Traoré (PDRM)	20
2016	Johor Darul Ta'zim (3)	Felda United	Kedah	Jorge Pereyra Díaz (Johor Darul Ta'zim)	18
2017	Johor Darul Ta'zim (4)	Pahang	Felda United	Mohammed Ghaddar (Kelantan and Johor Darul Ta'zim)	23
2018	Johor Darul Ta'zim (5)	Perak	PKNS	Rufino Segovia (Selangor)	19
2019	Johor Darul Ta'zim (6)	Pahang	Selangor	Kpah Sherman (PKNS)	14
2020	Johor Darul Ta'zim (7)	Kedah	Terengganu	Ifedayo Olusegun (Selangor)	12
2021	Johor Darul Ta'zim (8)	Kedah Darul Aman	Penang	Ifedayo Olusegun (Selangor)	26
2022	**Johor Darul Ta'zim** (9)	Terengganu	Sabah	Bérgson (Johor Darul Ta'zim)	29
2023	**Johor Darul Ta'zim** (10)	Selangor	Sabah	Ayron del Valle (Selangor)	23
2024–25	**Johor Darul Ta'zim** (11)	Selangor	Sabah	Bérgson (Johor Darul Ta'zim)	32
2025–26	**Johor Darul Ta'zim** (12)	Kuching City	Selangor	Bérgson (Johor Darul Ta'zim)	27

- Italic indicates double winners – i.e. top division league and Malaysia FA Cup or Malaysia Cup winners
- **Bold** indicates treble winners – i.e. top division league, Malaysia FA Cup and Malaysia Cup winners

== Total titles won ==
The table below list the top division winners since league trophy was introduced for the winners of Liga Malaysia in 1982. Teams in italics are no longer active.

Team	Winners	Winning years
Johor Darul Ta'zim	12	2014, 2015, 2016, 2017, 2018, 2019, 2020, 2021, 2022, 2023, 2024–25, 2025–26
Selangor	6	1984, 1989, 1990, 2000, 2009, 2010
Sri Pahang	5	1987, 1992, 1995, 1999, 2004
Penang	3	1982, 1998, 2001
Kedah Darul Aman	3	1993, 2006–07, 2007–08
Singapore	2	1985, 1994
Kuala Lumpur City	2	1986, 1988
Perak	2	2002, 2003
Kelantan	2	2011, 2012
Melaka United	1	1983
Johor FA	1	1991
Sabah	1	1996
Sarawak FA	1	1997
Perlis FA	1	2005
Negeri Sembilan	1	2005–06
LionsXII	1	2013

== Total titles won by region ==
Below are the list of the total top division titles won by region.

Region	Number of titles	Clubs
South	15	Johor Darul Ta'zim (12), Johor FA (1), Melaka United (1), Negeri Sembilan (1)
North	9	Kedah Darul Aman (3), Penang (3), Perak (2), Perlis FA (1)
Klang Valley	8	Selangor (6), Kuala Lumpur City (2)
East Coast	7	Sri Pahang (5), Kelantan (2)
International	3	Singapore (2), LionsXII (1)
Borneo	2	Sabah (1), Sarawak FA (1)
