= Saša Branežac =

Serbian footballer (born 1976)

Personal information
- Full name: Saša Branežac
- Date of birth: 23 December 1976 (age 49)
- Place of birth: Osijek, SR Croatia, SFR Yugoslavia
- Height: 1.82 m (6 ft 0 in)
- Position: Striker

Youth career
- –1995: Osijek

Senior career*
Years	Team	Apps	(Gls)
1995–1998	Sartid Smederevo		
1999–2001	Obilić	10	(0)
1999–2000	→ Sutjeska Nikšić (loan)	37	(12)
2001	→ Napredak Kruševac (loan)	15	(3)
2001–2002	MTK Hungária	30	(3)
2002	Sartid Smederevo	6	(1)
2003	Glasinac Sokolac	8	(0)
2003	Sutjeska Nikšić	10	(1)
2004	MPPJ Selangor		
2005	Čukarički	14	(4)
2005	Aiolikos		
2006	Penang FA		
2007–2008	Deltras Sidoarjo	32	(11)
2008	UPB-MyTeam		
2009	Al Hamriyah		
2009–2012	Kovačevac	71	(36)
- * Club domestic league appearances and goals

Saša Branežac (Serbian Cyrillic: Саша Бранежац; born 23 December 1976) is a Serbian former professional footballer who played as a striker. He also holds Croatian citizenship.

During his journeyman career, Branežac played professionally in Serbia and Montenegro, Hungary, Bosnia and Herzegovina, Malaysia, Greece, Indonesia, and the United Arab Emirates.

== Club career ==
Branežac was born in Osijek, SR Croatia, which was at the time part of Yugoslavia, and started playing at the youth team of local NK Osijek. He and his family decided to move to Serbia and he started playing for Sartid Smederevo, before transferring to FR Yugoslavia champions Obilić in the 1998–99 winter transfer window. He was later loaned to newly promoted First League club Sutjeska Nikšić for the 1999–2000 season, scoring 12 goals in 37 appearances.

In early 2004, Branežac moved to Asia and joined Malaysia Premier League side MPPJ Selangor. He helped them win first place in Group B and then beat the winners of Group A, Melaka Telekom, 3–2 in the season's final, as the club earned promotion to the Malaysia Super League.

== Statistics ==
Club	Season	League	
Club	Season	Apps	Goals
Sartid Smederevo	1997–98	23	7
Sartid Smederevo	1998–99	10	3
Obilić	1998–99	2	0
Sutjeska Nikšić (loan)	1999–2000	37	12
Obilić	2000–01	8	0
Napredak Kruševac (loan)	2000–01	15	3
MTK Hungária	2001–02	30	3
Sartid Smederevo	2002–03	6	1
Glasinac Sokolac	2002–03	8	0
Sutjeska Nikšić	2003–04	10	1
MPPJ Selangor	2004		
Čukarički	2004–05	14	4
Aiolikos	2005–06		
Penang FA	2005–06		
Deltras Sidoarjo	2007–08	32	11
UPB-MyTeam	2007–08		
Al Hamriyah	2008–09		
Kovačevac	2009–10	24	15
Kovačevac	2010–11	23	11
Kovačevac	2011–12	24	10
Career total		266	81

== Honours ==
MPPJ Selangor

- Malaysia Premier League: 2004
