= Rosmini Kahar =

Malaysian footballer

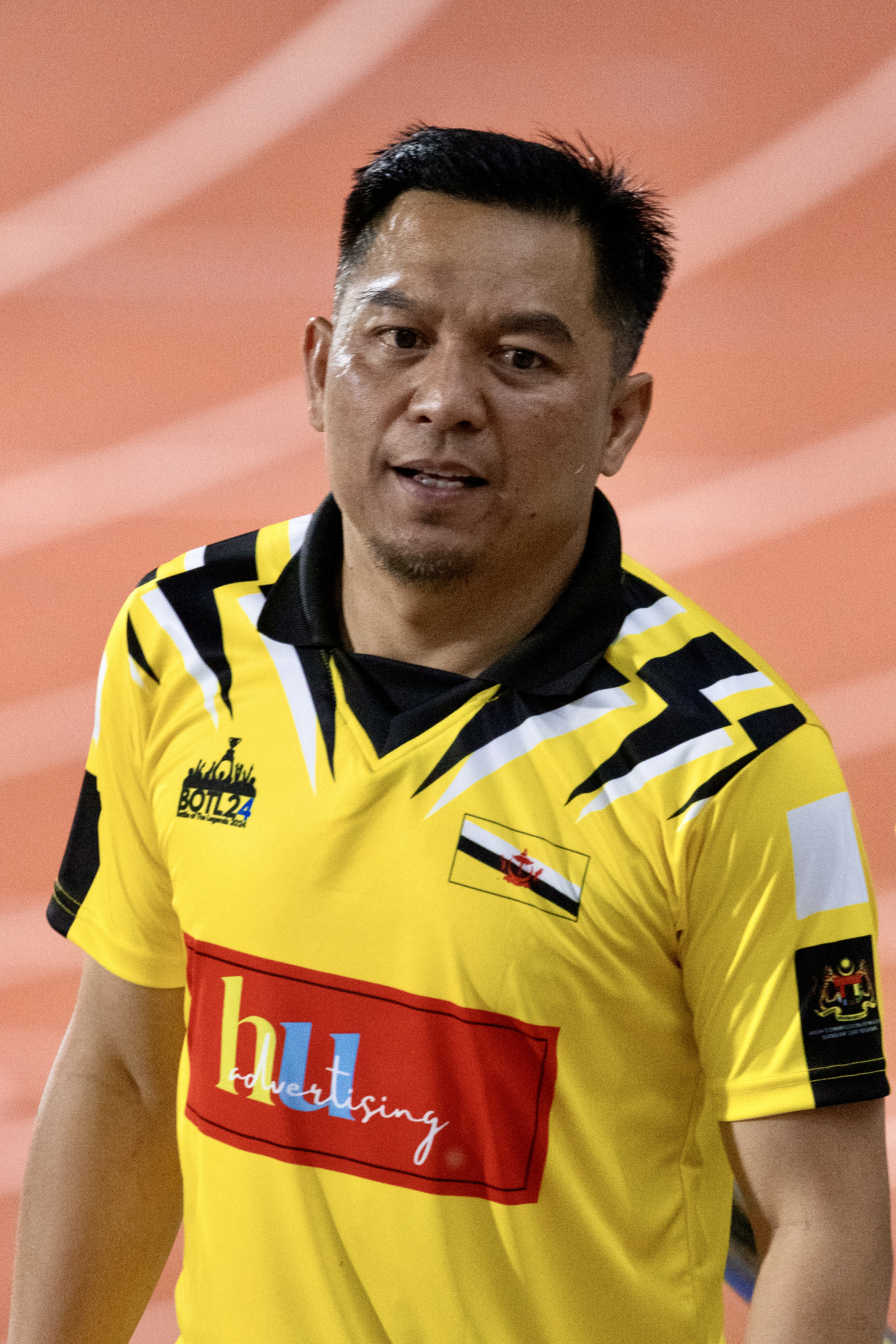
- Rosmini in 2024

Personal information
- Full name: Rosmini bin Haji Abdul Kahar
- Date of birth: 1 September 1979 (age 47)
- Place of birth: Brunei
- Position: Midfielder

Senior career*
Years	Team	Apps	(Gls)
2001–2003	Police Force		
2001–2005	Brunei		(1)
2003–2007	DPMM		
2008–2011	AM Gunners		
2012–2014	MS PDB		(18)
2017–2018	MS PDB		(2)
2019	Kasuka		

International career^{‡}
2001	Brunei U23	2	(0)
2001	Brunei	6	(0)

Managerial career
- 2024–: Kasuka & Ar Rawda Futsal
- * Club domestic league appearances and goals as of 6 April 2021 ‡ National team caps and goals as of 5 January 2017

Corporal Rosmini bin Haji Abdul Kahar (born 1 September 1979) is a Bruneian former footballer who played as a midfielder. He also played in the Malaysian leagues for the Brunei M-League representative team and later Brunei DPMM FC.

== Club career ==
Rosmini, a career policeman, played as a left-sided midfielder for the football team of the Royal Brunei Police Force. His performances in the international scene caught the eye of Mick Jones who drafted him into the Brunei M-League squad in 2001. He scarcely played for the Wasps due to work commitments and his preference to play at domestic club level for Brunei DPMM FC who signed him in 2003. He won the Brunei Premier League in 2004. His solitary goal for Brunei came in a 1–1 draw against Kedah on 20 March 2005.

A year later, Rosmini's club moved to the Malaysia Premier League for the 2005–06 season to replace Brunei. DPMM immediately won promotion, and in the following season, finished third in Malaysia's top tier. Unfortunately, he was axed along with Affendy Akup and Zulkefly Duraman to make way for four Malaysian players in the 2007–08 Malaysia Super League.

Rosmini joined newly formed AM Gunners in the 2008 Brunei Premier Two and became league champions, gaining promotion to the top flight. AM Gunners left the Bruneian football league system in 2011 after two seasons. Rosmini next moved to and captained a reformed MS PDB, returning to his first club in some ways. After a two-season hiatus, he re-appeared for the Policemen in the 2017 season.

After sitting out the first round of the 2018-19 Brunei Super League, Rosmini joined Kasuka FC in January 2019.

== International career ==
Rosmini made his international debut for Brunei at the 2002 World Cup qualifying round for Asia in a 0–5 loss against Yemen, coming on to replace fellow policeman Jasriman Johari on 7 April 2001. He started the rest of the qualifying matches as Brunei completed six games without scoring a goal. Brunei subsequently refused to take part in World Cup qualifying until the 2018 tournament.

Rosmini also played two games for the Brunei under-23s at the 21st SEA Games held in Malaysia in September 2001.
