= Mijo Dadić =

Croatian footballer

Personal information
- Full name: Mijo Dadić
- Date of birth: 15 October 1981 (age 45)
- Place of birth: Rijeka, SFR Yugoslavia
- Height: 1.88 m (6 ft 2 in)
- Position: Defender

Senior career*
Years	Team	Apps	(Gls)
2000–2004	Rijeka		
2000	→ Pomorac (Loan)		
2000	→ Orijent (Loan)	32	(4)
2004–2005	MK Land	45	(4)
2005–2006	Hrvatski Dragovoljac	8	(0)
2006–2008	UPB-MyTeam	55	(6)
2008–2011	Persiba Balikpapan	78	(5)
2011–2012	Deltras	25	(1)
2012–2013	Kelantan	8	(0)
2013–2014	Pelita Bandung Raya	31	(5)
2014–2017	Opatija	71	(3)

International career
–1997	Croatia U-16		
1997–1998	Croatia U-17		
1997–1999	Croatia U-18		
- * Club domestic league appearances and goals

Mijo Dadić (born 15 October 1981 in Rijeka) is a Croatian retired football player. He played for Pelita Bandung Raya in the Indonesia Super League among others.

== Careers ==
Mijo Dadić, the youngest of three, was enrolled in a football school at his birthplace in Rijeka at the age of 7. Mijo Dadić was selected to play for Croatian National Juniors at the Under-16, Under-17 and Under-18 age groups.

Mijo Dadić signed his first professional contract when he turned 19 years old, for his hometown club NK Rijeka. During his 4-year tenure with the club, NK Rijeka competed in the First Division. Targeted as one for the future, NK Rijeka loaned out the youngster to NK Pomorac in his first season, to gain more experience in the top-level competition. The central defender who was occasionally used as a cover in defensive midfield, spent six months there before being sent to NK Orient in the Second Division, also on loan. Following his successful short term stints at both clubs, NK Rijeka recalled Mijo Dadic for the start of his second season in 2001. Off the field, things did not turn out the way Mijo Dadić expected as he was not paid wages regularly, while on the field he did not get a chance. A new coach from across town took over the reins at NK Rijeka, side-lining Mijo Dadić in favour of players that had followed him there. Hapoel Ranana, promised to free Mijo Dadić of his misery in 2002 following successful trials with the Israeli outfit, but NK Rijeka demanded an astronomical figure of DM1 million (1 million Deutsche Marks = RM2.85 million Ringgit in 2002), causing Hapoel Ranana to balk at the figure and abandon plans of signing Mijo Dadić. Fed-up of his prospects at NK Rijeka with two more years remaining on his contract, Mijo Dadić began the search for other opportunities to venture abroad. He brokered at deal with the club that had owed him US$100,000 (RM 380,000 in 2002), telling the management of NK Rijeka that he would be willing to forego the amount in return for his International Transfer Certificate (ITC). Mijo Dadic wanted out, and they agreed.

Childhood friend Marin Mikac convinced his compatriot to seek fortune in Malaysia, and Mijo Dadic duly followed in 2004. Together with Marin Mikac, they managed to land a contract with Malaysian Premier League side MK Land FC, under the watchful eye of head coach Khan Hung Meng, joining a team laden with big stars of the Malaysian game such as Marlon Alex James, K. Nanthakumar, Shahrin Majid, Paidiya Rao, M. Chandran amongst others. There was much excitement for club football back then; fighting for honours with the states in the Malaysian League and MK Land FC emerged as a force to be reckoned with. In his first season there, MK Land FC missed out on promotion to the Malaysian Super League, finishing three points behind winners MPPJ FC, as during then only the champion's gain promotion. It was an almost similar tale the following season in 2005 when MK Land FC finished third in the standings, once more failing to obtain promotion. In 2006, MK Land FC pulled out of the M-League citing financial difficulties, and thus were handed a 5-year ban by Football Association of Malaysia (FAM). Their staff including the players were left in a quandary and Mijo Dadic was forced to head home, due to FAM's ruling whereby foreign players were not allowed to switch camps immediately within the League, upon completion of their contract, despite him attracting attention from other teams.

Returning to Croatia in 2006, Mijo Dadić played Second Division football with a club from Zagreb. It was a decent club but they too struggled with players' wages. Fellow countryman Bojan Hodak rescued Mijo Dadić from obscurity in their country, offering the latter a chance to play for another club side, UPB-MyTeam FC in their Malaysian Premier League debut. Mijo Dadic was glad to learn that his former mentor at MK Land FC, Khan Hung Meng also assumed a coaching position at the club, and immediately agreed to come back to Malaysia. It was a remarkable season for UPB-MyTeam FC, chugging their way up the standings to earn promotion to the Malaysian Super League, finishing runner-up. However, Mijo Dadić who played a pivotal part in the first half of the campaign, even scoring UPB-MyTeam FC's first ever goal in the M-League, was struck by ligament injury in the home match against Sabah FA in April, and missed the rest of the season recuperating.

Dadić will play in the Malaysian Super League for the first time for UPB-MyTeam FC. He signed a contract extension with the blub and stated that he "give[s his] best all the time, and [hates] to lose".

In Persiba Balikpapan Mijo Dadić was selected to be Captain of team. Then, he moved to Deltras in the Indonesia Super League on 2011/2012 season.

On 13 July 2012, Mijo Dadic moves to Malaysian Super League clubside, Kelantan FA for 6 months to compete in the AFC Cup 2012.

== Honours ==
=== Club honors ===
Kelantan

- Malaysia Cup (1): 2012
- Malaysia FA Cup (1): 2012
- Malaysia Super League (1): 2012
