= 2005 Malaysia Premier League =

Liga Premier
- Season: 2005
- Champions: Selangor; 2nd title
- Promoted: Selangor; Negeri Sembilan
- AFC Cup: Selangor (via winners FA Cup)

The 2005 Malaysia Premier League (Malay: 2005 Liga Premier Malaysia), also known as the TM Liga Premier for sponsorship reasons, was the second season of the Malaysia Premier League, the second-tier professional football league in Malaysia. The season was held from 6 February and concluded on 23 July 2005.

The Malaysia Premier League champions for 2005 was Selangor which beaten Negeri Sembilan during the final with a score of 4–2. Both clubs were promoted to Super League.

Due to exclusion of Public Bank who was relegated from 2005 Malaysia Super League and MK Land, who were suspended for five years from all competitions due to pulling out of the Malaysian League, the relegations of Melaka and PDRM were revoked and both teams remained in the 2005–06 Malaysia Premier League. For the next season, the Football Association of Brunei entered a club team, DPMM, rather than the squad from national team, the Brunei.

== Team ==
=== To Premier League ===
Relegated from Super League

- Sarawak
- Kedah

Promoted from 2004 FAM League

- Suria NTFA
- UPB Jendarata

=== From Premier League ===
Promoted to Super League

- MPPJ
- TM Melaka

Relegated to 2005 FAM League

- ATM
- JPS Kelantan
- SKMK Kelantan
- Kelantan

== League table ==
=== Group A ===
| Pos | Team | Pld | W | D | L | GF | GA | GD | Pts | Qualification or relegation |
|---|---|---|---|---|---|---|---|---|---|---|
| 1 | Selangor (C, P) | 21 | 16 | 3 | 2 | 61 | 25 | +36 | 51 | Promotion to Super League and final round Qualification to AFC Cup group stage (Note: Qualified as Malaysia FA Cup winners) |
| 2 | Kedah | 21 | 13 | 7 | 1 | 44 | 11 | +33 | 46 | |
| 3 | MK Land | 21 | 14 | 4 | 3 | 61 | 29 | +32 | 46 | Withrew from Premier League and dissolved. |
| 4 | Kuala Lumpur | 21 | 8 | 7 | 6 | 34 | 30 | +4 | 31 | |
| 5 | Brunei | 21 | 6 | 3 | 12 | 29 | 43 | −14 | 21 | Withrew from Premier League and dissolved. |
| 6 | Suria Nibong Tebal | 21 | 4 | 5 | 12 | 27 | 51 | −24 | 17 | |
| 7 | TNB Kelantan | 21 | 4 | 2 | 15 | 28 | 62 | −34 | 14 | |
| 8 | Melaka | 21 | 3 | 1 | 17 | 17 | 50 | −33 | 10 | |

Source: RSSSF
Rules for classification: 1) Points; 2) Goal difference; 3) Number of goals scored.
(C) Champions; (P) Promoted

=== Group B ===
| Pos | Team | Pld | W | D | L | GF | GA | GD | Pts | Qualification or relegation |
|---|---|---|---|---|---|---|---|---|---|---|
| 1 | Negeri Sembilan (P) | 21 | 16 | 1 | 4 | 45 | 19 | +26 | 49 | Promotion to Super League and final round |
| 2 | Terengganu | 21 | 13 | 4 | 4 | 34 | 18 | +16 | 43 | |
| 3 | PKNS | 21 | 13 | 2 | 6 | 46 | 25 | +21 | 41 | |
| 4 | Johor FC | 21 | 10 | 6 | 5 | 27 | 16 | +11 | 36 | |
| 5 | UPB Jendarata | 21 | 7 | 5 | 9 | 20 | 32 | −12 | 26 | |
| 6 | Johor | 21 | 6 | 2 | 13 | 18 | 29 | −11 | 20 | |
| 7 | Sarawak | 21 | 3 | 5 | 13 | 23 | 38 | −15 | 14 | |
| 8 | PDRM | 21 | 2 | 3 | 16 | 15 | 51 | −36 | 9 | |

Source: RSSSF
Rules for classification: 1) Points; 2) Goal difference; 3) Number of goals scored.
(P) Promoted

== Final ==
23 July 2005
20:15 UTC+8

| Negeri Sembilan | 2–4 | Selangor |
|---|---|---|
| Anuar Jusoh 15'; Idris Karim 53' | Report | Brian Fuentes 79'; K. Sanbagamaran 90'; D. Surendran 118'; Bambang Pamungkas 119' |

Tuanku Abdul Rahman Stadium, Seremban, Negeri Sembilan

== Goalscorers ==
| Position | Players | Clubs | Goals |
|---|---|---|---|
| 1 | (Indonesia) Bambang Pamungkas | Selangor | 23 |
| 2 | (Saint Vincent and the Grenadines) Marlon Alex James | (Selangor) MK Land | 22 |
| 3 | (Argentina) Brian Diego Fuentes | Selangor | 17 |
| 4 | (Cameroon) Christian Bekamenga | Negeri Sembilan | 16 |
| 5 | (Slovakia) Roman Chmelo (Malaysia) Rudie Ramli | (Selangor) PKNS (Selangor) PKNS | 13 |
| 7 | (Slovakia) Miloslav Toth | (Selangor) MK Land | 13 |
| 8 | (Nigeria) Peter Uademebuo (Malaysia) Rosli Azizan | (Perak) Jenderata (Penang) Suria Nibong Tebal | 10 |
| 10 | (Malaysia) Muhamad Khalid Jamlus | Selangor | 9 |

== See also ==
- 2005 Malaysia Super League
