= 2005–06 Malaysia Super League =

Malaysia Super League
- Season: 2005–06
- Dates: 3 December 2005 – 23 May 2006
- Champions: Negeri Sembilan NAZA; 1st title
- AFC Cup: Negeri Sembilan NAZA; Pahang
- Matches: 84
- Goals: 223 (2.65 per match)
- Top goalscorer: Keita Mandjou (17 goals, Perak)

The 2005–06 Malaysia Super League (Malay: 2005–06 Liga Super Malaysia), also known as the TM Liga Super for sponsorship reasons, was the third season of the Malaysia Super League, the top-tier professional football league in Malaysia. The season was held from 3 December 2005 and concluded on 23 May 2006.

== Summary ==
The winner this season was Negeri Sembilan NAZA. Negeri Sembilan NAZA garnered 40 points from 21 matches and won the title despite scoring less goals than all the other teams in the league except Pahang, who finished second from bottom. With this title, they finally erased the painful memory of losing the 1996 M-League crown having topped the table for most of that season.

Their nearest rivals were TM Melaka with 33 points. Having been in the title contention for most of the season, they were the best positioned club side in Liga Super history after Public Bank in 2004.

Perak's Keita Mandjou was the season's top scorer with 17 goals. Three matches, including Selangor's 6–1 hammering at the hands of Perlis, featured seven goals, and these were the season's highest scoring matches.

=== Relegation playoffs ===
As a result of the FAM decision to expand the league to 14 teams, the relegation playoffs were held on 18 June 2006. Six of the league's 14 places were up for grabs in this competition. Pahang and Selangor qualified for this competition by virtue of being the lowest placed Super League teams. Top teams from the Premier League also qualified for this competition (except for Kedah and Melaka, who were automatically promoted by virtue of being Premier League champions). The first round of matches saw Sarawak, Terengganu, Selangor and DPMM promoted. The second round of matches saw Johor FC and Pahang promoted.

== Teams ==
=== Changes from last season ===
Promoted from the Premier League

- Negeri Sembilan
- Selangor

Relegated to the Premier League

- Sabah
- Public Bank
Locations of teams in the 2005–06 Malaysia Super League.

=== Stadiums and locations ===
Note: Table lists in alphabetical order.

Team	Location	Stadium	Capacity
Negeri Sembilan NAZA	Seremban	Tuanku Abdul Rahman Stadium	45,000
Pahang	Kuantan	Darul Makmur Stadium	40,000
MPPJ	Petaling Jaya	Petaling Jaya Stadium	25,000
Penang	Batu Kawan	Penang State Stadium	40,000
Perak	Ipoh	Perak Stadium	35,000
Perlis	Kangar	Utama Stadium	20,000
Selangor	Bukit Jalil	Bukit Jalil National Stadium	87,411
TM Melaka	Malacca	Hang Tuah Stadium	15,000

== League table ==
Pos	Team	Pld	W	D	L	GF	GA	GD	Pts	Qualification or relegation
1	Negeri Sembilan (C)	21	12	4	5	26	14	+12	40	Qualification to AFC Cup group stage
2	TM Melaka	21	9	6	6	31	46	−15	33	
3	Perak	21	9	3	9	32	29	+3	30	
4	Perlis	21	8	6	7	26	25	+1	30	
5	MPPJ	21	9	2	10	28	27	+1	29	Withdrew from Super League and dissolved.
6	Penang	21	8	4	9	30	31	−1	28	
7	Pahang	21	7	6	8	21	24	−3	27	AFC Cup group stage and relegation play-offs (Note: Pahang qualified for the AFC Cup group stage as the Malaysia FA Cup winners.)
8	Selangor	21	5	3	13	31	46	−15	18	Qualification to relegation play-offs

Source: RSSSF
Rules for classification: 1) Points; 2) Goal difference; 3) Number of goals scored.
(C) Champions

== Relegation play-offs ==
All times are (UTC+8).

=== First round ===
==== First leg ====
18 June 2006
20:15

PKNS	0–3	Sarawak

Petaling Jaya Stadium
18 June 2006
20:15

Johor FC	2–3	Selangor

Pasir Gudang Stadium
18 June 2006
20:15

Sabah	0–1	Terengganu

Likas Stadium
18 June 2006

Pahang	0–0	DPMM

Darul Makmur Stadium

==== Second leg ====
21 June 2006
20:15

Sarawak	3–2	PKNS

Sarawak Stadium

6–2 on aggregate. Sarawak won on aggregate and are promoted to the Super League, while Sabah qualified to final round.

21 June 2006
20:15

Selangor	4–2	Johor FC

Bukit Jalil National Stadium

7–4 on aggregate. Selangor won on aggregate and remain in the Super League, while Johor qualified to final round.

21 June 2006
20:15

Terengganu	1–0	Sabah

Sultan Ismail Nasiruddin Shah Stadium

2–0 on aggregate. Terengganu won on aggregate and are promoted to the Super League, while Sabah qualified to final round.

21 June 2006
20:15

DPMM	2–1	Pahang

Hassanal Bolkiah National Stadium

2–1 on aggregate. DPMM won on aggregate and are promoted to the Super League, while Pahang qualified to final round.

=== Final round ===
==== First leg ====
25 June 2006
20:15

Pahang	3-2	Sabah

Darul Makmur Stadium
25 June 2006
20:15

PKNS	1–4	Johor FC

Petaling Jaya Stadium

==== Second leg ====
28 June 2006
20:15

Sabah	1-1	Pahang

Likas Stadium

3-4 on aggregate. Pahang won on aggregate and remain at Super League, Sabah remain at 2nd League

28 June 2006
20:15

Johor FC	1-1	PKNS

Pasir Gudang Stadium

5-2 on aggregate. Johor FC won on aggregate and remain in the Super League, Selangor PKNS remain at 2nd League

== Season statistics ==
=== Top scorers ===
Position	Players	Teams/Clubs	Goals
1	(Guinea) Keita Mandjou	Perak FA	17
2	(Zambia) Phillimon Chepita	Perlis FA	13
3	(Indonesia) Bambang Pamungkas	Selangor FA	11
4	(Argentina) Juan Manuel Arostegui	(Selangor) MPPJ FC	9
4	(Zambia) Chaswe Nsofwa	(Malacca) TM FC	9
6	(Cameroon) Christian Bekamenga	Negeri Sembilan FA	8
7	(Liberia) Josiah Seton	Pahang FA	6
7	(Malaysia) Mohammad Hardi Jaafar	(Malacca) TM FC	6
7	(Zimbabwe) Newton Ben Katanha	(Selangor) MPPJ FC	6
7	(Argentina) Brian Diego Fuentes	Selangor FA	6
