= 2005 Malaysia Super League =

Malaysia Super League
- Season: 2005
- Dates: 29 January – 9 July 2005
- Champions: Perlis; 1st title
- Relegated: Public Bank; Sabah
- AFC Cup: Perlis
- Matches: 84
- Goals: 239 (2.85 per match)
- Top goalscorer: Júlio César Rodrigues; Zacharia Simukonda (18 goals)

The 2005 Super League (Liga Super 2005), also known as the TM Liga Super for sponsorship reasons, was the second season of the Liga Super, the top-tier professional football league in Malaysia.

== Summary ==
The season was held from 29 January and concluded in 9 July 2005. The Liga Super champions for 2005 was Perlis. Perlis won the title after leaving the defending champions a huge 10 points behind. Penang escaped relegation on goal difference, having let in 4 goals less than Public Bank. The top goalscorer award was jointly won by Zacharia Simukonda from Perlis and Júlio César Rodrigues from Sabah. Both players scored 18 goals each. The highest number of goals featured in a match throughout the season was six. Four matches ended with six goals. The end of the season was marred by turmoil after Public Bank announced it would pulled out from the League, having been relegated. The team was eventually banned from all FAM competitions for five years.

== Changes from last season ==
Promoted from the 2004 Malaysia Premier League

- MPPJ
- TM

Relegated to the 2005 Malaysia Premier League

- Sarawak
- Kedah

== Stadiums and locations ==
Locations of teams in the Super League 2005

Note: Table lists in alphabetical order.

Team	Location	Stadium	Capacity
MPPJ	Petaling Jaya	Petaling Jaya Stadium	25,000
Pahang	Kuantan	Darul Makmur Stadium	40,000
Penang	Batu Kawan	Penang State Stadium	40,000
Perak	Ipoh	Perak Stadium	35,000
Perlis	Kangar	Utama Stadium	20,000
Public Bank	Selangor	Selayang Stadium	20,000
Sabah	Kota Kinabalu	Likas Stadium	30,000
TM Melaka	Malacca	Hang Tuah Stadium	15,000

== League table ==
Pos	Team	Pld	W	D	L	GF	GA	GD	Pts	Qualification or relegation
1	Perlis (C)	21	14	3	4	43	19	+24	45	Qualification to AFC Cup group stage
2	Pahang	21	10	5	6	37	29	+8	35	
3	Perak	21	9	3	9	33	25	+8	30	
4	TM Melaka	21	7	7	7	23	28	−5	28	
5	MPPJ	21	8	3	10	29	38	−9	27	
6	Penang	21	8	1	12	27	31	−4	25	
7	Public Bank (R)	21	7	4	10	22	30	−8	25	Relegation to Premier League
8	Sabah (R)	21	6	4	11	25	39	−14	22	Relegation to Premier League

Source: RSSSF
Rules for classification: 1) Points; 2) Goal difference; 3) Number of goals scored.
(C) Champions; (R) Relegated

== Result table ==
=== Round 1–14 ===
Home \ Away	MPP	PAH	PEN	PRK	PER	PBK	SAB	TMM
MPPJ	—	1–2	2–1	3–1	2–3	2–4	2–1	0–0
Pahang	3–2	—	4–1	4–1	0–1	1–2	3–3	3–0
Penang	2–3	3–2	—	2–1	1–2	3–1	3–0	0–1
Perak	2–1	0–0	0–1	—	1–2	1–0	2–0	0–0
Perlis	2–0	5–1	2–0	2–2	—	0–1	5–0	1–2
Public Bank	1–0	0–1	1–1	2–1	0–2	—	1–3	1–2
Sabah	1–1	0–2	0–4	1–0	2–0	2–1	—	1–1
TM Melaka	0–0	1–1	0–1	3–0	0–0	1–2	3–3	—

Source: RSSSF
Legend: Blue = home team win; Yellow = draw; Red = away team win.
For upcoming matches, an "a" indicates there is an article about the rivalry between the two participants.

=== Round 15–21 ===
Home \ Away	MPP	PAH	PEN	PRK	PER	PBK	SAB	TMM
MPPJ	—	1–1	—	1–5	—	2–1	—	—
Pahang	—	—	2–1	1–0	—	0–0	3–2	—
Penang	1–3	—	—	0–3	—	1–0	—	0–1
Perak	—	—	—	—	3–1	—	3–0	3–1
Perlis	4–0	2–1	1–0	—	—	—	—	4–0
Public Bank	—	—	—	0–4	3–3	—	1–0	—
Sabah	0–1	—	2–1	—	0–1	—	—	4–1
TM Melaka	3–1	3–2	—	—	—	0–0	—	—

Source: RSSSF
Legend: Blue = home team win; Yellow = draw; Red = away team win.
For upcoming matches, an "a" indicates there is an article about the rivalry between the two participants.

== Season statistics ==
=== Top scorers ===
Rank	Player	Club	Goals
1	(Brazil) Júlio César Rodrigues	Sabah	18
1	(Zambia) Zachariah Simukonda	Perlis	18
3	(Cameroon) Bernard Tchoutang	Pahang	12
4	(Zimbabwe) Newton Katanha	MPPJ	11
4	(Brazil) José Barreto	Penang	11
4	(Malaysia) Indra Putra Mahayuddin	Pahang	11
4	(Guinea) Mandjou Keita	Perak	11
8	(Liberia) Frank Seator	Perak	10
9	(Russia) Vyacheslav Melnikov	Penang	8
10	(Argentina) Fabricio Franceschi	MPPJ	6
10	(Malaysia) Fadzli Saari	Pahang	6

== See also ==
- 2005 Malaysia Premier League
