= Nazzab Hidzan =

Malaysian footballer

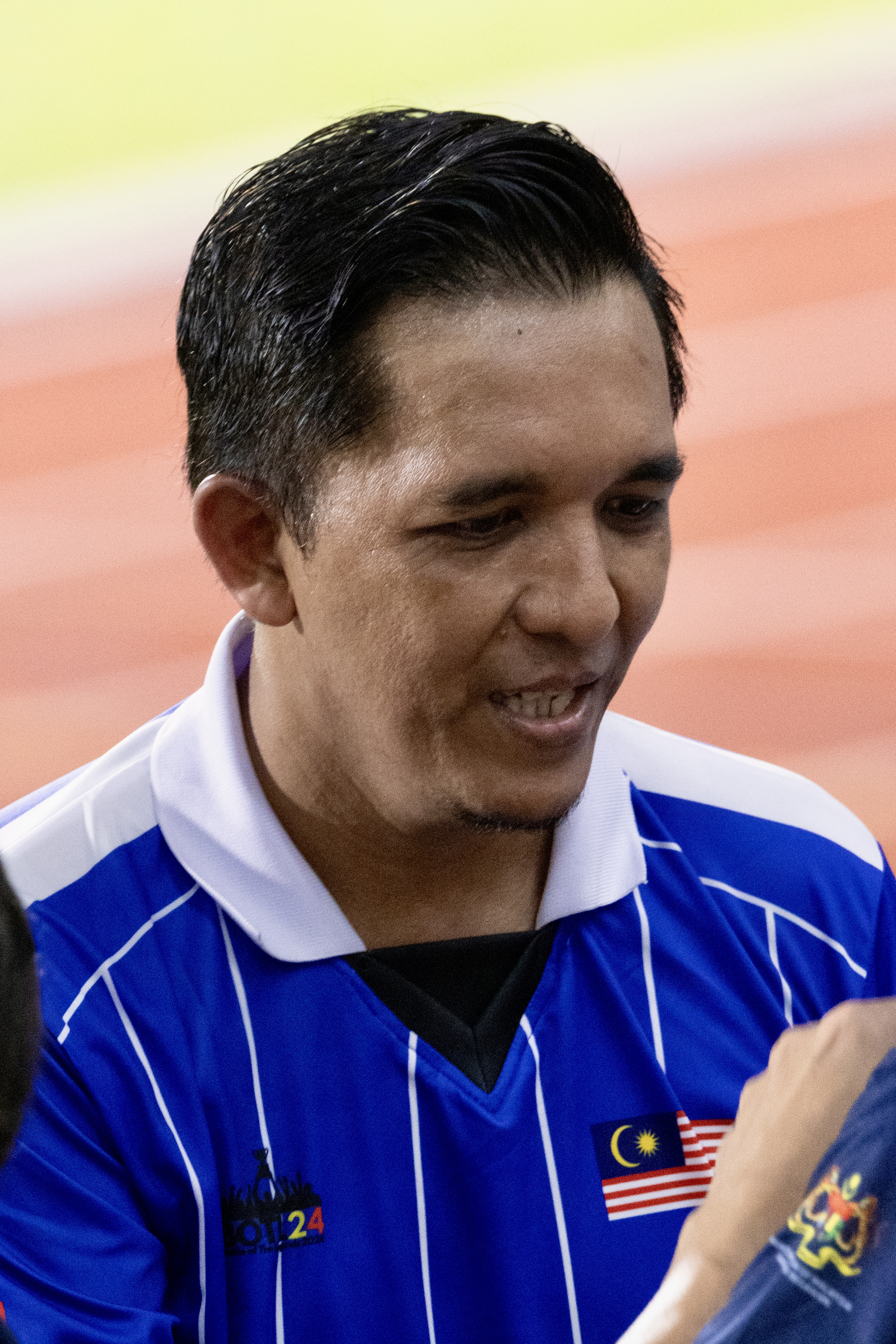
- Nazzab in 2024

Personal information
- Full name: Nazzab Hidzan
- Date of birth: 24 March 1975 (age 51)
- Place of birth: Klang, Selangor, Malaysia
- Position: Midfielder

Youth career
- 1993: Proton FC
- 1994–1996: Selangor FA

Senior career*
Years	Team	Apps	(Gls)
1996–2000	Selangor FA		
2001	Negeri Sembilan FA		
2002	Perlis FA		
2003–2004	Melaka TMFC		
2005–2006	Selangor FA		
2006–2007	Melaka TMFC		

International career^{‡}
1998	Malaysia	1	(0)
- * Club domestic league appearances and goals as of 12 January 2012 ‡ National team caps and goals as of 23 January 2009

Nazzab Hidzan (born 24 March 1975) is a Malaysian former professional football player.

A midfield playmaker in his playing days, he is commonly associated with Selangor FA where he played for 8 years during his career, winning 2 Malaysia Cups (1997 and 2005), Malaysia Premier League One championship (the top league, same level as current Malaysia Super League) in 2000, and Malaysia Premier League championship (the second level league) in 2005. He also played for Telekom Melaka, where he won Premier League Group B championship in 2004, and also played for Negeri Sembilan FA and Perlis FA.

He also played for Malaysia national football team, debuting in a friendly match against China national football team in 1998 under coach Hatem Souissi. This is currently his only known appearance for the national team.

Currently he can be seen at Malaysia satellite channel Astro Arena, as a co-commentator and football pundit for football games broadcast on the channel with Hasnizam Uzir, Azlan Johar, Asmawi Bakiri and Stanley Bernard.
