= Kamarulzaman Hassan =

Malaysian footballer

Personal information
- Full name: Kamarulzaman bin Haji Hassan
- Date of birth: 17 January 1979 (age 47)
- Place of birth: Penang, Malaysia
- Height: 1.85 m (6 ft 1 in)
- Position: Goalkeeper

Youth career
- 1998–1999: Penang President Cup

Senior career*
Years	Team	Apps	(Gls)
2000–2003	Penang		
2004	Sarawak		
2005–2006	Penang		
2006–2007	Melaka		
2007–2008	Proton FC		

International career^{‡}
1999–2001	Malaysia under-23		(0)
2000–2001	Malaysia	8	(0)
Medal record
Malaysia under-23
Sea Games
Silver medal – second place	Sea Games 2001	Football
- * Club domestic league appearances and goals as of 6 January 2022 ‡ National team caps and goals as of 6 December 2013

Kamarulzaman Hassan (born 17 January 1979) is a former Malaysian footballer. He is a former member of the Malaysian national team. Currently he works as assistant coach and goalkeeping coach in the Petaling Jaya Rangers F.C. football team.

== Career ==
He spend his majority professional career at Penang FA, his birthplace football team. He also played with Malacca FA, Sarawak FA and Proton FC.

== National team ==
Kamarulzaman represented the Malaysia national football team 8 times in 2000, during the height of his career. He made his debut during 2000 Tiger Cup in Thailand. He also represents Malaysia national under-23 football team for the SEA Games.

He, along with Muhamad Khalid Jamlus and Azmin Azram Abdul Aziz, was dropped from the national squad in early 2001 for staying out late at a disco before the 2002 World Cup preliminary games against Qatar, Palestine and Hong Kong.

Perhaps his infamous claim to fame occurs during the 2001 SEA Games in Malaysia, when the Malaysia under 23 team were in the final match against Thailand. With the pressure of winning the first gold medal in football since 1989 SEA Games, also in Malaysia, and in front on the home fans, Kamarulzaman, who until then were playing the best football of his career, made a grave mistake. A harmless cross from Sarawut Treephan, was deflected by Kamarulzaman who try to clear it, into the back of his own net. The goal, three minutes from full-time, proved to be the winning goal for Thailand. Kamarulzaman, blamed for the Malaysia loss, never played for Malaysia again.

== Honours ==
=== Penang FA ===
- Malaysia Premier 1 League: 2001
- Malaysia FA Cup: 2002
- Malaysia Charity Shield: 2003

=== Proton FC ===
- Malaysia FAM Cup: 2007
