= Marlon James =

Marlon James may refer to:

- Marlon James (novelist) (born 1970), Jamaican writer, winner of the 2015 Man Booker Prize
- Marlon James (footballer) (born 1976), Vincentian retired footballer
