= Khalid Jamlus =

Malaysian footballer(born 23 February 1977)

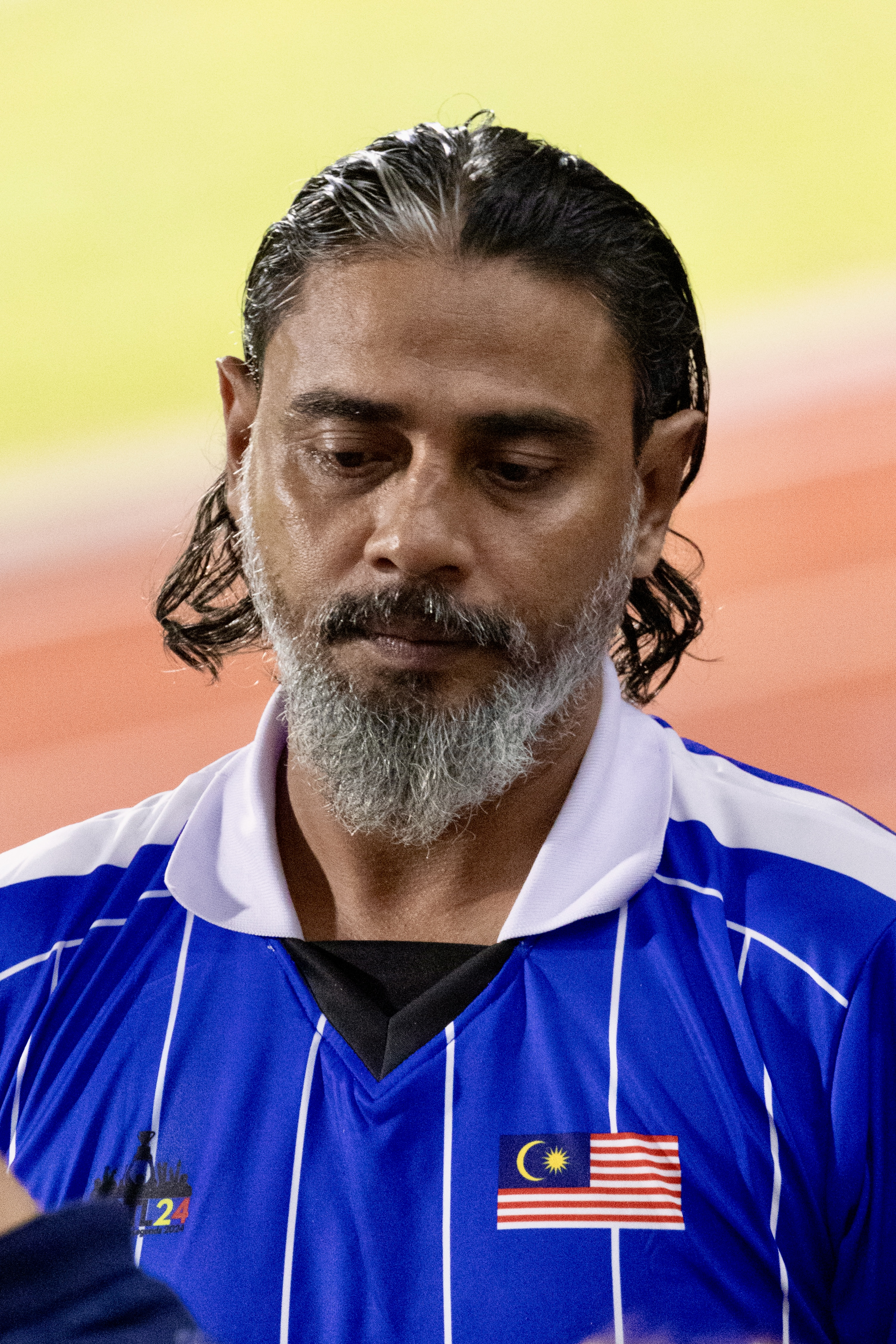
- Khalid in 2024

Personal information
- Full name: Muhamad Khalid bin Jamlus
- Date of birth: 23 February 1977 (age 49)
- Place of birth: Kuala Lumpur, Malaysia
- Height: 1.78 m (5 ft 10 in)
- Position: Striker

Youth career
- 1993–1997: Perak FA

Senior career*
Years	Team	Apps	(Gls)
1998	Olympic 2000	17	(4)
1999–2004	Perak FA	104	(50)
2005–2006	Selangor FA	27	(9)
2007–2008	Perak FA	41	(28)
2009	Kelantan FA	21	(9)
2010	ATM FA	0	(0)
2011	Kelantan FA	8	(1)
Total		218	(101)

International career
1997–1999	Malaysia U23	32	(22)
2002	Malaysia U23 (AG)	3	(3)
1998–2005	Malaysia	24	(8)
- * Club domestic league appearances and goals

Muhamad Khalid bin Jamlus (born 23 February 1977) is a Malaysian former footballer. He is a former member of the Malaysian national team and also has played for the Pre-Olympic squad. In 2002, he went on trial with Eintracht Frankfurt. He is widely regarded as one of the best striker of Perak FA and was the club's all-time top goalscorer.

== Career ==
Khalid first played for Perak FA President's Cup Team before being selected to join the Olympic 2000. After Olympic 2000 was disbanded, he left to play for his former club. During his first stint with Perak FA, he was a crowd favourite. However, doubts about his work-rate persisted throughout his stint with the Seladang. In 2005, Khalid signed for Selangor FA and starred in an attacking trio alongside Brian Diego Fuentes and Bambang Pamungkas, helping the club win a historic treble of Malaysia Premier League, Malaysia Cup and Malaysia FA Cup.

He returned to Perak FA in time for the 2007 season. He forged a lethal partnership with Guinean Keita Mandjou, scoring 15 of the 36 goals that were scored between them. His efforts led him to become a front-runner for the Favourite Striker Award.

Mandjou left at the start of the 2008 season, leaving Khalid to build a new partnership with Chilean Carlos Cáceres. Khalid managed to score 13 goals and emerged as Malaysian top scorer for 2 years consecutively.

He left Perak FA along with his teammate Ahmad Azlan Zainal to join Kelantan FA for the 2009 season. He then left Kelantan FA to join ATM FA for the 2010 season, but his contract was terminated and he didn't made any appearance in league. Khalid returned to Kelantan FA for the 2011 season, however he was not retained in the team for the 2012 season.

== National team ==
After establishing himself as a first-team player for the country in 2001, Khalid's international career was rocked when he was sacked by the then-head coach Allan Harris, along with Kamarulzaman Hassan and Azmin Azram Abdul Aziz for staying out late at a disco before the 2002 World Cup preliminary games against Qatar, Palestine and Hong Kong. In 2002, Khalid was call up for an international friendly match against five times World Cup winners Brazil. He was selected as one of the first eleven to play against Brazilian stars such as Ronaldo and Barca's Ronaldinho.

On 30 September 2002, Khalid had scored a Hattrick against the Maldives under-23 for Malaysia under-23 in 2002 Busan Asian Games and won 3–1.

Khalid is widely considered as the best target man in the country, and has been proven right by coaches such as Bertalan Bicskei, who stuck with him throughout the 2004 Tiger Cup. He eventually silenced his critics with 2 goals against archrivals Thailand, in a game in which Malaysia won 2–1. Malaysia finished at 3rd place with Khalid emerged as a second top goalscorer behind Ilham Jaya Kesuma with 6 goals in that tournament.

However, he was no longer been selected for national team after 2004 even showed outstanding performance in domestic league, especially in 2006 and 2007 with Perak FA. Khalid earn 24 international caps scoring 8 goals for Malaysia.

== Career statistics ==
=== International ===
As of 22 July 2020.

Malaysia national team
Year	Apps	Goals
2005	2	1
2004	8	4
2002	3	1
2001	4	1
2000	1	0
1999	3	0
1998	3	0
Total	24	8

== International Goals ==
=== Senior ===
#	Date	Venue	Opponent	Score	Result	Competition
1.	5 Feb 2001	Lautoka, Fiji	Fiji	1-4	Lost	Friendly
2.	16 July 2002	Kuantan, Malaysia	Singapore	1-2	Lost	Friendly
3.	10 December 2004	Kuala Lumpur, Malaysia	Philippines	4-1	Won	2004 Tiger Cup Group Stage
4.	10 December 2004	Kuala Lumpur, Malaysia	Philippines	4-1	Won	2004 Tiger Cup Group Stage
5.	14 December 2004	Kuala Lumpur, Malaysia	Thailand	2-1	Won	2004 Tiger Cup Group Stage
6.	14 December 2004	Kuala Lumpur, Malaysia	Thailand	2-1	Won	2004 Tiger Cup Group Stage
7.	3 January 2005	Kuala Lumpur, Malaysia	Indonesia	1-4	Lost	2004 Tiger Cup Semi Final
8.	15 January 2005	Singapore, Singapore	Myanmar	2-1	Won	2004 Tiger Cup Third Place Match

== Honours ==
=== Club ===
Perak FA

- Liga Perdana 1: 2002, 2003
- Malaysia FA Cup: 2004
- Malaysia Cup: 2000
- Piala Sumbangsih runner-up: 2001

Selangor FA

- Malaysia Premier League: 2005
- Malaysia FA Cup: 2005
- Malaysia Cup: 2005
- Piala Sumbangsih runner-up: 2006

Kelantan FA

- Malaysia FA Cup runner-up: 2009
- Malaysia Cup runner-up: 2009

=== International ===
- AFF Championship: 2004 third place

=== Individual ===
- Liga Perdana 1 Golden Boot: 2002 (17 goals)
- FAM Award - Best Striker : 2006-07
