= Affendy Akup =

Bruneian footballer

Personal information
- Full name: Affendy bin Haji Akup
- Date of birth: 16 February 1985 (age 41)
- Place of birth: Brunei
- Height: 1.77 m (5 ft 9 1/2 in)
- Position: Defender

Team information
- Current team: MS ABDB
- Number: 2

Senior career*
Years	Team	Apps	(Gls)
2004–2005	MS ABDB		
2005–2007	DPMM		
2007–2020	MS ABDB		

International career^{‡}
2008–2015	Brunei	10	(0)
- * Club domestic league appearances and goals as of 14 June 2021 ‡ National team caps and goals as of 24 November 2022

Soldadu Affendy bin Haji Akup (born 16 February 1985) is a Bruneian footballer who plays as a defender.

Affendy was the team captain of MS ABDB, the football team of the Royal Brunei Armed Forces. In 2005, he had a two-year stint with DPMM FC, at that time playing in the Malaysia Premier League, but was released along with Zulkefly Duraman and Rosmini Kahar to make way for four Malaysian players. He has lifted the domestic FA Cup with MS ABDB for six consecutive times.

Affendy made his debut for the national team in the 2008 AFC Challenge Cup qualification, losing 0–1 to the Philippines on 13 May. He was ever-present in the 2012 AFF Suzuki Cup qualifying, as well as substitute appearances in both legs of the 2018 World Cup qualifiers against Chinese Taipei in March 2015.

== Honours ==
MS ABDB

- Brunei Super League (3): 2015, 2016, 2017–18
- Brunei FA Cup (6): 2007–08, 2009–10, 2012, 2014–15, 2015, 2016
- Brunei League Cup: 2006
