= Zulkefly Duraman =

Bruneian footballer

Zulkefly
Personal information
- Full name: Zulkefly bin Duraman
- Date of birth: 5 August 1982 (age 44)
- Place of birth: Brunei
- Position: Defender

Senior career*
| Years | Team | Apps | (Gls) |
| 2002–2005 | Brunei | | |
| 2002–2006 | Wijaya | | |
| 2006–2007 | DPMM | | (0) |
| 2007–2013 | Wijaya | | |

International career^{‡}
| 2001 | Brunei U23 | 2 | (0) |
| 2002 | Brunei U21 | | (1) |
| 2001–2008 | Brunei | 7 | (0) |

Managerial career
- 2018–2021: Wijaya
- 2023–2024: Kota Ranger
- * Club domestic league appearances and goals as of 6 August 2021 ‡ National team caps and goals as of 6 August 2021

Zulkefly bin Duraman (born 5 August 1982) is a Bruneian former footballer and current coach who played as a defender. He played for the Brunei representative team that participated in the Malaysian leagues, and predominantly Wijaya FC.

== Club career ==
Zulkefly played for Wijaya FC since the formation of the B-League in 2002. He won the FA Cup of that year as well as the championship in 2003 and also featured for the Brunei team that played in the Malaysian second division until the end of the 2005 season.

In late 2006, Zulkefly attended tryouts for newly promoted Malaysia Super League side DPMM FC and subsequently signed a contract to play for the royally-owned club for the 2006–07 season. However, despite an incredible season where DPMM FC managed to finish third in the league, Zulkefly could not dislodge the trio of Rene Komar, Sallehuddin Damit and Shahrul Rizal Abdul Rahman from the starting places and saw very little playing time. Towards the start of the next season, Zulkefly was released along with Affendy Akup and Rosmini Kahar to make way for four Malaysian players.

Zulkefly returned to Wijaya and played in the Bruneian top flight until the end of the 2013 season, transitioning into a coach and being promoted into head of the coaching team in 2018. He became assistant to returning coach and former team manager Mahdini Mohamad in 2022.

== International career ==
Zulkefly was called up for the Brunei national football team in early 2001 for the 2002 FIFA World Cup qualification matches. He made his international debut in a 4–0 away loss against the United Arab Emirates at Al Ain City on 4 May 2001. He next appeared as a late substitute in the final qualifying match, away against India on 20 May which ended in a 5–0 victory to the home side.

Later that year, Zulkefly was selected for the Brunei Under-23s competing at the 21st SEA Games held in Kuala Lumpur, Malaysia. He played in two out of three games, which were heavy defeats to Malaysia and Vietnam. When the Hassanal Bolkiah Trophy was inaugurated in 2002, Zulkefly was a participant for the hosts and managed to score a goal against Malaysia.

Zulkefly then played for the Wasps in the 2004 Asian Cup qualifying matches that were held in the Maldives in March 2003, where Brunei failed to advance. Five years later, he gained caps for the 2008 AFC Challenge Cup qualification matches held in the Philippines in May 2008, featuring in all three games.

== Honours ==
Wijaya FC

- B-League: 2003
- Brunei FA Cup: 2002
