= 2002 Liga Perdana 1 =

Football competition

Liga Perdana 1
- Season: 2002
- Dates: 19 January – 6 July 2002
- Champions: Perak; 1st Premier League One title 1st Liga M title
- Relegated: Kuala Lumpur; Negeri Sembilan
- 2003 ASEAN Club Championship: Perak FA (group stage)
- Matches: 182
- Goals: 492 (2.7 per match)
- Top goalscorer: 17 goals Muhamad Khalid Jamlus (Perak)

The 2002 Liga Perdana 1 season is the fifth season of Liga Perdana 1. A total of 14 teams participated in the season.

The season kicked off on January 19, 2002. Perak dominated the season and ended up winning the title. Perak's Muhamad Khalid Jamlus was the season's top goalscorer with 17 goals.

Johor FC finished the season strongly, attracting attention as one of the club sides competing in the league. During this period, the Football Association of Malaysia was promoting the development of club-based teams as part of its long-term plans for Malaysian football.

== Teams ==
A total of 14 teams will participate in the 2002 Liga Perdana 1 season.

- Penang FA (2001 Liga Perdana 1 champions)
- Terengganu FA
- Kelantan FA
- Selangor FA
- Pahang FA
- Perlis FA
- Perak FA
- Negeri Sembilan FA
- Sarawak FA
- Kuala Lumpur FA
- Malacca FA
- Johor FC (Promoted as 2001 Liga Perdana 2 champions)
- Sabah FA (Promoted as 2001 Liga Perdana 2 runner-up)
- (Negeri Sembilan) NS Chempaka FC (Promoted as 2001 Liga Perdana 2 3rd-Place)

== League table ==
Pos	Team	Pld	W	D	L	GF	GA	GD	Pts	Qualification or relegation
1	Perak FA	26	19	3	4	42	15	+27	60	Champion
2	Selangor FA	26	17	5	4	43	27	+16	56	
3	Sabah FA	26	13	8	5	48	30	+18	47	
4	Penang FA	26	13	8	5	48	31	+17	47	
5	Terengganu FA	26	12	5	9	36	24	+12	41	
6	Johor FC	26	12	5	9	37	27	+10	41	
7	Perlis FA	26	11	8	7	31	23	+8	41	
8	Sarawak FA	26	8	10	8	40	28	+12	34	
9	Pahang FA	26	8	7	11	43	39	+4	31	
10	Kelantan FA	26	9	3	14	29	41	−12	30	
11	Malacca FA	26	8	3	15	28	48	−20	27	
12	NS Chempaka FC	26	4	7	15	21	50	−29	19	Withdrew from Liga Perdana 1 and dissolved.
13	Kuala Lumpur FA	26	4	4	18	21	48	−27	16	Relegated to Liga Perdana 2
14	Negeri Sembilan FA	26	4	4	18	25	61	−36	16	Relegated to Liga Perdana 2

Source: rsssf.com

== Top goalscorers ==
Source: FIFA: Liga Perdana 1 Scorers

Rank	Scorer	Club	Goals
1	(Malaysia) Muhamad Khalid Jamlus	Perak FA	17

== Champions ==
2002 Liga Perdana 1 winner

Perak
1st title
