= MK F.C. =

There are no teams by the name of MK F.C. nor Milton Keynes F.C., however it may erroneously refer to:

- Milton Keynes Dons F.C., a professional football club based in Milton Keynes, England.
- Milton Keynes City F.C., a number of short-lived former semi-professional football clubs from Milton Keynes, England.
- MK Wanderers F.C. an amateur team from Milton Keynes, England.
- MK Land F.C., a now defunct Malaysian football team based in Selayang, Selangor.
