= Hardi Jaafar =

Malaysian footballer (born 1979)

Mohammad Hardi Jaafar
Personal information
- Date of birth: 30 May 1979 (age 47)
- Place of birth: Ipoh, Perak, Malaysia
- Height: 1.65 m (5 ft 5 in)
- Position: Midfielder

Team information
- Current team: MOF F.C.
- Number: 10

Senior career*
Years	Team	Apps	(Gls)
1999–2003	Melaka Telekom	72	(9)
2004	Selangor FA	21	(3)
2005–2007	Melaka Telekom	41	(10)
2007–2008	Perak FA	30	(2)
2009–2011	Selangor FA	53	(11)
2012–2014	Felda United FC	12	(2)
2014–2016	Perak FA	12	(1)
2016	MOF F.C.	0	(0)

International career^{‡}
2006	Malaysia U-23	3	(2)
2008	Malaysia	5	(1)
2006–2009	Malaysia	29	(4)
- * Club domestic league appearances and goals as of 31 December 2015 ‡ National team caps and goals as of 31 December 2015

Mohammad Hardi Jaafar (born 30 May 1979) is a Malaysian footballer who is a midfielder. Hardi Jaafar is known for his shooting techniques, contributing many long shot goals and being a set piece taker. He is a former member of the Malaysia national football team.

== Career ==
He was the captain of the Melaka Telekom team prior to their withdrawal from the Malaysia Super League competition. He then agreed to join his home team, Perak FA, for the 2007/08 season. He helped Perak to reach the quarterfinal of the 2008 AFC Cup.

With Malaysia, Hardi was given his first ever international caps against New Zealand on 19 February 2006. His impressive playing style and creative performances led to him being one of the three senior players chosen by Norizan Bakar for the 2006 Doha Asian Games.

Hardi made his first appearance in the Asian Games by scoring a goal against the Oman under-23. He then scored a goal against China under-23 in the second match. However Malaysia finished bottom of the group after losing all three matches, 1–3 against Oman under-23, 1–3 against China under-23, and 0–4 to eventual silver medalist Iraq under-23.

After the Asian Games, Hardi was selected for the 2007 ASEAN Football Championship. He started in all of the matches in the tournament. He made his first international goal in the semi-final against Singapore. However Malaysia eventually lost to Singapore in the penalty shootout after drawing the second game in Singapore.

He also was chosen to be on the national team for the 2007 AFC Asian Cup, where he played in all of Malaysia's matches. In this tournament, Malaysia were beaten by China in the opening game 1–5, won 5–0 against Uzbekistan, then lost to quarterfinalist Iran 0–2.

At the 2008 Merdeka Tournament, Hardi helped Malaysia reach the final but his team lost against Vietnam.

Hardi also represented the Malaysia XI (Malaysia Selection) squad against Chelsea F.C. at Shah Alam Stadium on 29 July 2008. The Malaysia XI eventually lost 0–2. However, Chelsea manager Luiz Felipe Scolari praised the Malaysia XI for giving a good fight against his team.

For the 2009 Malaysia League, Hardi left Perak FA and returned to his former team, Selangor FA. He made his second debut with Selangor in the match against Kedah, which Selangor won 4–1.

He spent the 2012 season playing for Felda United FC. In 2013, he did not play for any club due to injury. He made a comeback in 2014 to join his former club Perak FA.

== International goals ==
#	Date	Venue	Opponent	Score	Result	Competition
1.	23 January 2007	Shah Alam, Malaysia	Singapore	1–1	Draw	2007 ASEAN Football Championship
2.	24 March 2007	Colombo, Sri Lanka	Sri Lanka	1–4	Won	Friendly
3.	26 March 2007	Colombo, Sri Lanka	Sri Lanka	2–1	Lost	Friendly
4.	29 November 2008	Kelana Jaya, Malaysia	Singapore	2–2	Draw	Friendly

== Honours ==
Telekom Melaka FC

- Malaysia Super League: Runners-up 2005–06

Selangor

- Malaysia Super League: 2009, 2010
- Malaysia FA Cup: 2009
- Malaysia Charity Shield: 2009

Malaysia

- Pestabola Merdeka: 2008 runner up
