= Uzir =

Uzir (Hindi: उज़िर) is a surname. Notable people with the surname include:

- Hasnizam Uzir (1975), former Malaysian striker
- Sushil Uzir (1957), Indian cricketer
