= 2004 Malaysia Premier League =

Liga Premier
- Season: 2004
- Champions: MPPJ; 1st title
- Promoted: MPPJ; TM
- Relegated: JPS; Kelantan

The 2004 Liga Premier (English: 2004 Premier League), also known as the Dunhill Liga Premier for sponsorship reasons, was the inaugural season of the Liga Premier, the new second-tier professional football league in Malaysia.

The season was held from 14 February and concluded on 14 August 2004.

The Liga Premier champions for 2004 was MPPJ which beaten TM during the final with a score of 3–2. Both clubs were promoted to 2005 Liga Super.

== Team changes ==
=== To Premier League ===
Relegated from Liga Perdana 1

- Johor FC
- Melaka Telekom
- Kelantan FA
- Malacca FA
- Selangor FA
- Terengganu FA

Promoted from 2003 FAM Cup

- PKNS
- MK Land

=== From Liga Perdana 2 ===
Promoted to 2004 Malaysia Super League

- Public Bank FC

Relegated to 2004 FAM Cup

- Perak TKN

== League table ==
=== Group A ===
Pos	Team	Pld	W	D	L	GF	GA	GD	Pts	Qualification or relegation
1	(Malacca) TM	24	17	1	6	41	24	+17	52	Promoted to Super League
2	Selangor	24	16	2	6	52	35	+17	50	
3	Johor FC	24	14	5	5	43	25	+18	47	
4	(Selangor) PKNS	24	13	4	7	47	35	+12	43	
5	TNB Kelantan	24	11	3	10	32	27	+5	36	
6	PDRM	24	7	7	10	34	44	−10	28	
7	Brunei	24	8	2	14	48	49	−1	26	
8	ATM	24	7	2	15	37	49	−12	23	Relegated to Liga FAM
9	(Kelantan) JPS	24	2	0	22	27	73	−46	6	Relegated to Liga FAM

=== Group B ===
Pos	Team	Pld	W	D	L	GF	GA	GD	Pts	Qualification or relegation
1	(Selangor) MPPJ	24	13	6	5	49	28	+21	45	Promoted to Super League
2	(Selangor) MK Land	24	13	3	8	42	31	+11	42	
3	Kuala Lumpur	24	10	8	6	44	33	+11	38	
4	Negeri Sembilan	24	10	8	6	45	35	+10	38	
5	Terengganu	24	8	11	5	33	27	+6	35	
6	Johor	24	8	8	8	30	31	−1	32	
7	Malacca	24	6	9	9	32	38	−6	27	
8	(Kelantan) SKMK	24	8	2	14	24	47	−23	26	Relegated to Liga FAM
9	Kelantan	24	1	7	16	13	42	−29	10	Relegated to Liga FAM

=== Goalscorers ===
Position	Players	Teams	Goals
1	(Argentina) Brian Diego Fuentes	Selangor	25
2	(Brazil) Marcelo Padilha da Rocha	Kuala Lumpur	23
3	(Saint Vincent and the Grenadines) Marlon Alex James	(Selangor) MK Land	19
4	(Argentina) Walter Ariel Silva	Johor FC	18
5	(Argentina) Juan Arostegui	(Selangor) MPPJ	16
6	(Malaysia) Nazzab Hidzan	(Malacca) TM	13
7	(Ghana) David Anas (Serbia) Sasa Brenezac	PDRM (Selangor) MPPJ	12
9	(Malaysia) Shahrin Abdul Majid (Brazil) Liberto Silas	Negeri Sembilan; Brunei	11
11	(Togo) Alfa Fotowabawi (Slovenia) Emir Dzafic (Slovakia) Roman Chmelo (Malaysia) S. Sunder (Thailand) Saranuwat Nasartsang	Terengganu; Malacca (Selangor) PKNS; Kuala Lumpur (Kelantan) SKMK	10
