= Newton Ben Katanha =

Zimbabwean football striker (born 1983)

Personal information
- Date of birth: 3 February 1983 (age 43)
- Place of birth: Seke, Zimbabwe
- Height: 1.78 m (5 ft 10 in)
- Positions: Attacking midfielder; striker

Youth career
- CAPS United

Senior career*
Years	Team	Apps	(Gls)
1999	CAPS United		
1999–2001	SV Austria Salzburg	2	(0)
2001–2003	BSV Bad Bleiberg	52	(15)
2003–2004	DSC Arminia Bielefeld	22	(1)
2004–2005	Selangor MPPJ		
2006	PFC Spartak Nalchik	1	(0)
2007–2010	FC Schaffhausen	72	(29)
2010–2013	FC Winterthur	45	(14)
2014–2015	Phnom Penh Crown	5	(3)

International career
2001–2005	Zimbabwe	3	(0)
- * Club domestic league appearances and goals

Newton Ben Katanha (born 3 February 1983) is a Zimbabwean former football striker.

He was a member of the Zimbabwe national football team from 2004, and played in the 2006 African Nations Cup for the Zimbabwe national football team, which failed to qualify for the quarter-finals.

== Honours ==
- Malaysia Premier League: 1

2004

- Cambodian League: 1

2014
