= Júlio Rodriguez (footballer, born 1980) =

Brazilian footballer

Julio Rodrigues
Personal information
- Full name: Julio Cesar Rodrigues De Souza
- Date of birth: November 16, 1980 (age 45)
- Place of birth: São Paulo, Brazil
- Height: 1.85 m (6 ft 1 in)
- Position: Striker

Senior career*
| Years | Team | Apps | (Gls) |
| 2000 | Colorado FC PR | | |
| 2001 | Londrina | | |
| 2002 | Busan I'Park | | |
| 2003 | Caraziense Esporte Clube RS | | |
| 2004 | Santa Cruz | | |
| 2005–2006 | Sabah | 41 | (27) |
| 2007 | Rio Branco | | |
| 2007 | Persiba Balikpapan | | |
| 2008 | Perlis | | |
| 2009 | Buzău | | |
| 2009–2010 | Yangon United | | |
- * Club domestic league appearances and goals

Julio Cesar Rodrigues de Souza (born November 16, 1980, in São Paulo, Brazil) is a Brazilian former footballer.

== Career ==
He is well known in the Malaysian League and won the Malaysia Super League 2005 golden boot with 18 goals.
