= 2007–08 Malaysia Super League =

Liga Super
- Season: 2007–08
- Dates: 18 November 2007 – 13 August 2008
- Champions: (Kedah) Kedah; 2nd title
- Relegated: Sarawak
- 2009 AFC Cup: Kedah; Johor FC
- Matches: 156
- Goals: 480 (3.08 per match)
- Top goalscorer: Marlon Alex James (23 goals, Kedah)

The 2007–08 Liga Super, also known as the TM Liga Super, for sponsorship reasons, was the fifth season of the Liga Super, the top-tier professional football league in Malaysia.

The season was held from 18 November 2007 and concluded on 13 August 2008.

The Liga Super champions for 2007–08 was Kedah.

== Team changes ==
The following teams have changed division.

=== To Malaysia Super League ===
Promoted from Premier League

- PDRM
- UPB-MyTeam

=== From Malaysia Super League ===
Relegated to Premier League

- Malacca

Withrawal from 2007–08 Malaysia Super League

- TM FC

== Teams competing ==
- Kedah
- Perak
- DPMM
- Terengganu
- PDRM (Note: promoted from Liga Premier)
- Perlis
- Johor FC
- Selangor
- Pahang
- Penang
- Negeri Sembilan
- Sarawak
- UPB-MyTeam

== Foreign players ==
Club	Visa 1	Visa 2	Visa 3	Former Player(s)
Kedah	(Saint Vincent and the Grenadines) Marlon Alex James	(Saint Vincent and the Grenadines) Cornelius Huggins	(Chile) Nelson San Martín	
Negeri Sembilan	(Nigeria) Udo Fortune	(Sierra Leone) Lamin Conteh	(Slovakia) Marián Juhás	
Johor FC	(Cameroon) Moudourou Moise	(Argentina) Gustavo Fuentes	(Argentina) Walter Ariel Silva	
Selangor	(Zambia) Evan Chisulo	(Liberia) Frank Seator	(Indonesia) Ellie Aiboy	
Perak	(Chile) Carlos Cáceres	(Chile) Jorge Muñoz	(Chile) Mario Berríos	
Terengganu	(Brazil) Fábio Flor	(Brazil) Jocian Bento	(Nigeria) Emmanuel Ifeanyi	
Perlis	(Zambia) Phillimon Chepita	(Zambia) Kabwe Kamuzati	(Argentina) Gustavo Chena	
Pahang	(Guinea) Boubacar Keita	(Brazil) Cristiano Lopes	(Morocco) Redouane Barkaoui	
PDRM	(Kenya) Hillary Echesa	(Kenya) Michael Baraza	(Singapore) Noh Alam Shah	
DPMM	(Cameroon) Didier Belibi	(Cameroon) Christian Kono	(Australia) Terry Oliver	
UPB-MyTeam	(Brazil) Edvaldo Goncalves Pereira	(Serbia) Saša Branežac	(Croatia) Mijo Dadić	
Penang	(Argentina) Alex Daniel Cabrera	(Jamaica) Scott Alistair Lawson		
Sarawak	(Guinea) Mansa Sylla	(Cameroon) Nyom Nyom Alloys	(Brazil) Piousdinho Evwierhome James	

== League table ==
Pos	Team	Pld	W	D	L	GF	GA	GD	Pts	Qualification or relegation
1	Kedah	24	18	2	4	55	24	+31	56	Qualification for the AFC Cup
2	Negeri Sembilan	24	14	6	4	48	30	+18	48	
3	Johor FC	24	14	4	6	40	27	+13	46	Qualification for the AFC Cup
4	Selangor	24	14	3	7	46	36	+10	45	
5	Perak	24	13	2	9	46	34	+12	41	
6	Terengganu	24	10	7	7	41	31	+10	37	
7	Perlis	24	10	6	8	36	25	+11	36	
8	Pahang	24	8	6	10	26	31	−5	30	
9	(Malaysia) PDRM	24	7	3	14	30	52	−22	24	
10	(Brunei) DPMM	24	4	10	10	27	34	−7	22	
11	(Malaysia) UPB-MyTeam	24	6	4	14	30	40	−10	22	
12	Penang	24	4	5	15	30	49	−19	17	
13	Sarawak	24	4	2	18	25	67	−42	14	Relegated to Liga Premier

== Champions ==
2007-08 TM Liga Super winner
Kedah
3rd title

== Season statistics ==
=== Top scorers ===
Position	Players	Teams/Clubs	Goals
1	Marlon Alex James	Kedah	23
2	Carlos Arturo Caceres	Perak	17
3	Frank Seator	Selangor	15
4	Walter Ariel Silva	Johor FC	14
5	Muhamad Khalid Jamlus	Perak	13
6	Phillimon Chipeta	Perlis	13
7	Mohd Safee Mohd Sali	Selangor	11
8	Mohd Zaquan Adha Abdul Radzak	Negeri Sembilan	11
9	Gleisson Freire	Terengganu	10
10	Gustavo Andres Fuentes	Johor FC	10

== See also ==
- List of Liga Super seasons
