= Hasnizam Uzir =

Malaysian footballer

Hasnizam Uzir (born 1975 in Johor Bahru) is a former Malaysian striker. He formerly played with Johor FA and Johor FC.

He also the former member of Malaysia Olympic Team (Malaysia U-23) in 1995.

== Honours ==
Johor FA

- Malaysia FA Cup: 1998
