= 2005–06 Malaysia Premier League =

Liga Premier
- Season: 2005–06
- Champions: Kedah; 3rd title
- Promoted: Kedah; Malacca

The 2005–06 Liga Premier (English: 2005–06 Premier League), also known as the TM Liga Premier due to sponsorship reasons, was the third season of the Liga Premier, the second-tier professional football league in Malaysia.

The season began on 4 December 2005 and concluded on 22 May 2006.

The champions for the 2005–06 season was Kedah which defeated Malacca during the final with a score of 1–0. Both clubs were promoted to the 2006–07 Malaysia Super League.

== Teams ==
Changes from last season:

=== To Premier League ===
Relegated from Super League

- Sabah

Promoted from 2005 FAM League

- Kelantan
- Shahzan Muda

Invited team exchanged with Brunei

- DPMM FC^{^{3}}

=== From Premier League ===
Promoted to Super League

- Selangor
- Negeri Sembilan

Relegated to 2007 FAM League

- No Team.

Pull out and exchanged with DPMM FC

- Brunei^{^{3}}

Withdrawn

- Public Bank^{^{1}}
- MK Land^{^{2}}

=== Name changes ===
- Jenderata changed its name to UPB to reflect its ownership.

Notes:

^1 Relegated from Super League and the end of 2005 season, the club decided to withdraw from the Malaysian Premier League, citing financial difficulties. As a result, the club were then banned from entering all competitions organised by the Football Association of Malaysia (FAM) for 5 years.
^2 Due to exclusion of Public Bank who was relegated from the 2005 Malaysia Super League and MK Land, who were suspended for five years from all competitions due to pulling out of the Malaysian League, the relegations of Malacca and PDRM were revoked and both teams remained in the Premier League for the 2005–06 season.
^3For the 2005–06 season, the Football Association of Brunei entered a club team, DPMM, rather than the squad from national team, the Brunei.

== League table ==
=== Group A ===
Pos	Team	Pld	W	D	L	GF	GA	GD	Pts	Promotion
1	Kedah	21	13	3	5	39	22	+17	42	Promoted to 2006–07 Liga Super
2	Terengganu	21	12	5	4	47	21	+26	41	Promoted to 2006–07 Liga Super
3	(Brunei) DPMM	21	9	6	6	40	33	+7	33	Promoted to 2006–07 Liga Super
4	Sarawak	21	8	6	7	40	39	+1	30	Promoted to 2006–07 Liga Super
5	Johor	21	7	5	9	23	26	−3	26	
6	Kelantan	21	7	5	9	29	36	−7	26	
7	(Perak) UPB	21	5	4	12	28	43	−15	19	
8	(Penang) Suria Nibong Tebal	21	3	6	12	16	42	−26	15	Relegated to Malaysia FAM Cup and dissolved.

=== Group B ===
Pos	Team	Pld	W	D	L	GF	GA	GD	Pts	Promotion
1	Malacca	21	13	4	4	48	24	+24	43	Promoted to 2006–07 Liga Super
2	(Selangor) PKNS	21	11	6	4	39	25	+14	39	
3	Johor FC	21	9	8	4	38	27	+11	35	Promoted to 2006–07 Liga Super
4	Sabah	21	7	7	7	32	31	+1	28	
5	Kuala Lumpur	21	8	3	10	28	31	−3	27	
6	PDRM	21	7	3	11	30	44	−14	24	
7	(Pahang) Shahzan Muda	21	5	7	9	30	41	−11	22	
8	TNB Kelantan	21	3	4	14	16	38	−22	13	Relegated to Malaysia FAM Cup and dissolved.

== Final ==
17 June 2006
20:45 UTC+8

Kedah	1–0	Malacca
Poalo Roberto Da Silva 12'

Darul Aman Stadium, Alor Setar, Kedah
Attendance: 32,387
