= 2006–07 Malaysia Super League =

Liga Super
- Season: 2006–07
- Dates: 16 December 2006 – 4 August 2007
- Champions: (Kedah) Kedah; 1st title
- Relegated: Malacca
- 2008 AFC Cup: Kedah; Perak
- Matches: 156
- Goals: 480 (3.08 per match)
- Top goalscorer: Keita Mandjou (Perak); Mohd Shahrazen Said (DPMM); 20 goals
- Highest scoring: Malacca 0-9 Perak

The 2006–07 Liga Super (English: 2006–07 Super League), also known as the TM Liga Super for sponsorship reasons, was the fourth season of the Liga Super, the top-tier professional football league in Malaysia.

The season was held from 16 December 2006 and concluded on 4 August 2007.

The Liga Super champions for 2006–07 was Kedah.

The FAM has decided to expand the league from eight teams to 14 in total, however, only 13 clubs compete at the start of the season after MPPJ pulled from the league.

The highest scoring game was between Malacca and Perak where Perak defeat Malacca by 9–0.

Perak's Keita Mandjou and DPMM's Mohd Shahrazen Said were joint-top scorer with 21 goals each. Kedah's Marlon Alex James was in third place with 20 goals.

== Team changes ==
The following teams have changed division.

=== To Malaysia Super League ===
Promoted from Premier League

- Kedah
- Malacca
- Terengganu
- DPMM
- Sarawak
- Johor FC

=== From Malaysia Super League ===
Withrawal from 2006–07 Malaysia Super League

- MPPJ FC

== League table ==
The final league table after the final matches of the season on 4 August 2007.

Pos	Team	Pld	W	D	L	GF	GA	GD	Pts	Qualification or relegation
1	Kedah	24	17	4	3	54	21	+33	55	Qualification for the AFC Cup
2	Perak	24	16	5	3	58	22	+36	53	Qualification for the AFC Cup
3	(Brunei) DPMM	24	13	5	6	46	29	+17	44	
4	Terengganu	24	13	5	6	41	29	+12	44	
5	Perlis	24	13	4	7	47	25	+22	43	
6	Johor FC	24	11	6	7	35	26	+9	39	
7	(Malacca) TM	24	10	6	8	34	33	+1	36	Withdrew from Super League and dissolved.
8	Selangor	24	8	4	12	27	36	−9	28	
9	Pahang	24	7	6	11	32	41	−9	27	
10	Penang	24	6	6	12	25	36	−11	24	
11	Negeri Sembilan	24	6	6	12	29	46	−17	24	
12	Sarawak	24	2	4	18	28	65	−37	10	
13	Malacca	24	2	3	19	24	72	−48	9	Relegated to Liga Premier

== Champions ==
2006–07 Liga Super winner
Kedah
2nd title

== Season statistics ==
=== Top scorers ===
Position	Players	Teams/Clubs	Goals
1	(Guinea) Keita Mandjou (Brunei) Shah Razen Said	Perak FA (Brunei) DPMM FC	21
3	(Saint Vincent and the Grenadines) Marlon Alex James	Kedah FA	20
4	(Argentina) Walter Ariel Silva	Johor FC	16
5	(Malaysia) Muhamad Khalid Jamlus	Perak FA	15
6	(Malaysia) Mohd Azlan Ismail	Perlis FA	13
6	(Zambia) Phillimon Chepita	Perlis FA	13
8	(Brazil) Sharlei Miranda	Terengganu FA	11
9	(Angola) Frederico Dos Santos	Negeri Sembilan FA	9
9	(Malaysia) Akmal Rizal Ahmad Rakhli	Selangor FA	9
