= Marin Mikac =

Croatian footballer and manager

Personal information
- Date of birth: 20 April 1982 (age 44)
- Place of birth: Rijeka, SFR Yugoslavia
- Height: 1.80 m (5 ft 11 in)
- Positions: Attacking midfielder; forward

Youth career
- Rijeka

Senior career*
Years	Team	Apps	(Gls)
2000–2001	Rijeka	7	(1)
2001–2002	Pomorac	1	(0)
2002	Rijeka	12	(0)
2003	Uljanik Pula		
2003–2004	Pomorac		
2004–2005	MK Land		
2005–2006	Osijek	4	(0)
2006–2007	UPB-MyTeam		
2007–2008	Kerkyra	13	(1)
2008–2009	Al-Ansar		
2009–2010	Pomorac		
2010	Orijent		
2010–2011	Jadran Poreč		
2011–2012	Nehaj		

International career
1998	Croatia U15	2	(0)
1999	Croatia U16	1	(0)
1999–2000	Croatia U17	3	(0)
2001–2003	Croatia U20	8	(3)

Managerial career
- 2015–2017: Naprijed Hreljin
- 2018–2019: Orijent 1919
- 2019: Zmaj Blato
- 2020: Uljanik
- 2020–2021: Bilje
- 2022–2023: Halubjan
- 2023–2024: Bilje
- * Club domestic league appearances and goals

Marin Mikac (born 20 April 1982) is a Croatian football manager and former player.

== Club career ==
As a player, Mikac played for local clubs Rijeka and Osijek, as well as in Malaysia, Greece and Lebanon.

== Managerial career ==
Mikas was named manager of Orijent 1919 in October 2018, succeeding Danilo Butorović. In March 2020, he took the reins at Uljanik after Ivan Kukučka resigned. In August 2022, he was appointed manager of NK Halubjan, succeeding Neven Strukan.
