= MK Land F.C. =

Malaysian football club

MK Land FC
- Full name: MK Land Football Club
- Nickname: The Properties
- Founded: 2000; 26 years ago
- Ground: Majlis Perbandaran Selayang Stadium, Selayang, Selangor
- Capacity: 10,000
- League: Malaysia Premier League
- 2005: 3rd place (Group A)
Home colours	Away colours

MK Land Football Club was a professional football club from Malaysia, based in Selayang, Selangor. The club played in the 2003 Malaysia FAM League and became runners-up, promoted to the 2004 Malaysia Premier League. They withdrew from the Premier League competition in 2006, citing financial difficulties. As a result, they were banned from entering all competitions organised by the Football Association of Malaysia for five years. The club competed in the Selangor League in 2014.

== History ==
Established in 2000, MK Land FC is a football club based in Selayang, Selangor, is a club founded by housing company MK Land Holdings Berhad. This club is called "The Properties" This club has played in the 2003 Malaysia FAM League and finished as runner-up place. Selangor MK Land FC was then promoted to the 2004 Malaysia Premier League together with PKNS F.C. Among the imported players who have joined this club are Ivan Žiga (Serbia), Marlon Alex James (St. Vincent & Grenadines) and Bhaichung Bhutia (India). Selangor MK Land FC's best achievement was ranked third, group A of the 2005 Malaysia Premier League.

Selangor MK Land FC withdrew from the 2005–06 Malaysia Premier League due to financial problems. As a result, Selangor MK Land FC was banned from participating in all football tournaments organized by FAM for 5 years. In 2014 after 7 years away from the Selangor football world MK Land FC returned by joining the FAS League.

== Kit manufacturers and financial sponsor ==
Season	Kit manufacturer	Main sponsor	Other sponsor
2003	(Germany) Adidas	Dunhill	MK Land Properties
2004	(Italy) Lotto	Dunhill	MK Land Properties
2005	(Italy) Kappa	Celcom	MK Land Properties

== Season by season record ==
Season	Division	Position	Malaysia Cup	Malaysian FA Cup	Malaysian Charity Shield	Regional	Top scorer (all competitions)
2003	Malaysia FAM Cup	Runner-up	DNQ	DNQ	–	–	
2004	Malaysia Premier League	2nd place (Group B)	Group Stage	Round 1	–	–	
2005	Malaysia Premier League	3rd place (Group A)	Group Stage	Round 2	–	–	

Champions	Runners-up	Third place	Promoted	Relegated
