= Mandjou Keita =

Guinean footballer (born 1979)

Personal information
- Date of birth: 28 November 1979 (age 46)
- Place of birth: Nzérékoré, Guinea
- Height: 1.86 m (6 ft 1 in)
- Positions: Attacking midfielder; forward

Senior career*
Years	Team	Apps	(Gls)
2004–2007	Perak	75	(50)
2008	Brunei DPMM	0	(0)
2009–2010	Portland Timbers	39	(12)
2009–2010	→ Salgaocar (loan)	9	(8)
2010–2012	Pune FC	17	(16)
2013	Kelantan	11	(5)
Total		172	(102)

International career
1998–2001	Guinea U23	16	(10)
2001–2011	Guinea	36	(16)
- * Club domestic league appearances and goals

Mandjou Keita (born 28 November 1979) is a Guinean international former footballer who plays as an attacking midfielder or forward.

== Career ==
=== Club ===
Keita began his professional career in Malaysia with Perak, making his debut on 12 September 2004 against PKNS FC. He impressed Perak FA's fans so much that he was carried off the pitch by two jubilant fans after the match He went on to play a key role in Perak FA's Malaysian FA Cup winning team, which led to his contract being renewed for the 2005 season.

Keita won the Golden Boot award for the 2006 season, scoring 17 goals. He was one of the three nominees for the Favourite Import Player award in the inaugural Malaysian football awards but he did not win.

Keita was linked with a move away from the club to Indonesian team Persija Jakarta in 2007, but did not let those rumours affect his on-pitch performance, and ended up Perak's top scorer once again for the 2006/2007 season.

Keita was released from his contract at the end of the 2007 season due to "family issues", and after attending trials with French side FC Lorient, signed with Bruneian side DPMM FC in the 2007 close season. He played only one competitive game for DPMM which was in the 2008 Singapore Cup against Woodlands Wellington in a 1–0 loss, before being released due to DPMM's expulsion from the Malaysia Super League.

In January 2009, Keita signed with Portland Timbers in the USL First Division. Keita's preferred playing position is as a striker, but he can also operate in midfield behind the front two.

Following the 2009 USL-1 season, Portland loaned Keita to Salgaocar S.C. of the Indian I-League. Keita returned to Portland in April, 2010.

After returning to the Timbers from loan, Keita failed to find his form in the 2010 season. Keita appeared in 10 league games and scored just one goal. On 1 September, Keita was transferred to Indian club Pune.

=== Pune FC ===
On 3 December 2010 Keita started his I-League journey with Pune FC first game of the season, a tie 1-1 against Mohun Bagan. On 30 January 2011 Keita scored his first hat-trick for the club against JCT Mills in the I-League.

=== Kelantan FA ===
After two season with Pune FC, Keita returned to Malaysia to join Malaysian club Kelantan FA as the fourth import player for the 2012 AFC Cup competition. However, he was not eligible to play in the AFC Cup because of problems with regard to his International Transfer Certificates (ITC).

== International career ==
Keita was a member and captain of the Guinea U-23 national team.

== Honors ==
=== Perak ===
- FA Cup Malaysia: 2004

=== Portland Timbers ===
- USL First Division Commissioner's Cup: 2009

=== Individual ===
- Super League Malaysia Golden Boot (2): 2005-06, 2006-07
- USL First Division All-League First Team: 2009
