= Brian Diego Fuentes =

Argentine footballer

Personal information
- Full name: Brian Diego Fuentes
- Date of birth: March 4, 1976 (age 50)
- Place of birth: Buenos Aires, Argentina
- Position: Striker

Senior career*
Years	Team	Apps	(Gls)
1996–1997	Banfield	23	(17)
1997–1998	Deportivo Italiano	37	(9)
1998–1999	Arsenal de Sarandí	15	(1)
1999–2000	Nueva Chicago	24	(6)
2000	Foggia	3	(0)
2001	Cruz Azul Hidalgo	16	(13)
2001–2002	River Plate Montevideo	15	(7)
2002–2003	União da Madeira	16	(1)
2003	US Ariano Calcio	?	(?)
2004–2006	Selangor FA	66	(48)
2006	Zamora FC Barinas	25	(22)
2007	Almagro	31	(23)
2007–2008	Deportivo Morón	38	(26)
2008–2009	Talleres (RdE)		
2009–2010	San Telmo		
2010–2011	Berazategui		
- * Club domestic league appearances and goals as of March 25, 2016 ‡ National team caps and goals as of March 25, 2016

Brian Diego Fuentes (born 4 March 1976) is a former professional Argentine football (soccer) player.

== Career ==
He formerly played for Selangor FA in Malaysian Premier League, helping Selangor win the treble (Premier League, FA Cup and Malaysia Cup) in 2005, as well as winning Golden Boot as league's top scorer in the previous year.
