= Marlon James (footballer) =

Vincentian footballer (born 1976)

Marlon Alex James
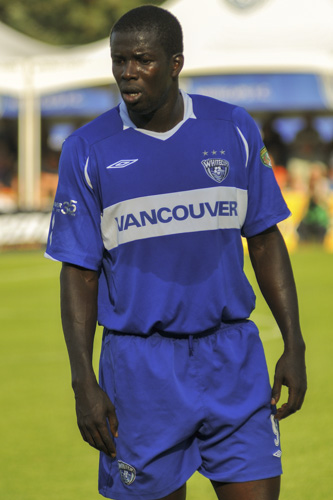
- James with Vancouver Whitecaps in 2009

Personal information
- Full name: Marlon Alex James
- Date of birth: 16 November 1976 (age 49)
- Place of birth: Kingstown, Saint Vincent and the Grenadines
- Height: 1.88 m (6 ft 2 in)
- Position: Forward

Youth career
- 1993–1994: Youth Olympians

Senior career*
Years	Team	Apps	(Gls)
1995–1997	Combined Stars FC	79	(63)
1998–1999	Newwill Hope International FC	56	(42)
2000	Bray Wanderers	0	(0)
2001–2002	Tirsense	33	(24)
2002–2003	Youth Olympians	29	(25)
2003–2004	Newwill Hope International FC	16	(20)
2004–2005	Selangor MK Land FC	39	(41)
2005	Newwill Hope International FC		
2006–2008	Kedah FA	94	(85)
2009–2010	Vancouver Whitecaps	23	(10)
2009	→ Whitecaps Residency (loan)	1	(1)
2012–2014	ATM FA	54	(47)
Total		424	(358)

International career
1995–2008	Saint Vincent and the Grenadines	55	(12)
- * Club domestic league appearances and goals

Marlon Alex James (born 16 November 1976) is a Vincentian former soccer player.

== Career ==
=== Youth and early Caribbean career ===
James began his career in his native St. Vincent with the Youth Olympians, and played club soccer for Combined Stars FC and Newwill Hope International FC, eventually turning professional in 2000.

=== Professional ===
James began his professional career in Ireland with Bray Wanderers. He transferred to FC Tirsense in the Portuguese Second Division in 2001, and later played for Selangor MK Land FC in Malaysia, scoring 19 league goals in 2004 and 22 goals in 2005. He also played for Selangor FA in 2005 for Sultan Selangor Cup against Singapore FA.

James enjoyed a hugely successful period with Kedah FA in Malaysia between 2006 and 2008. On 8 September 2007, his two goals enabled Kedah FA to clinch the Malaysia Cup title in a 3–0 win over Perak FA at National Stadium Bukit Jalil, Kuala Lumpur, and also brought Kedah FA to the highest level in Malaysian football history. James received the 2006/2007 Most Valuable Foreign Player award in the 100Plus-F.A.M National Football Awards after his team won the treble – Malaysian FA Cup, Malaysian Super League, and Malaysia Cup. He scored a total of 40 goals in those 3 competitions. He also retained his Most Valuable Foreign Player award in the next season after helping Kedah FA to win another treble in the 2007/2008 season.

After the Football Association of Malaysia barred foreign players from competing in the 2008 season of the Malaysia Super League, James moved to Canada, signing a two-year deal with the Vancouver Whitecaps in the USL First Division.

After residing in his homeland and resting from playing football for a year, he returned to Malaysia and joined the Malaysia Premier League club, ATM FA alongside Bruno Martelotto. Marlon helped ATM FA win the 2012 Malaysia Premier League, runners-up in the 2012 Malaysia Cup as well as win the Super League Golden Boot for the second time in 2013.

In May 2014, Marlon terminated his contract with ATM FA and subsequently retired from playing football professionally, due to persistent injuries which made him missed most of the ATM FA's 2014 season matches.

=== International ===
James has represented St. Vincent & Grenadines. Since 1995, the striker has earned 55 caps and scored 12 goals for his country, including four goals in 10 FIFA World Cup qualifying matches. His last international goal was scored against Canada in Montreal, Canada on 20 June 2008, when St. Vincent & Grenadines lost 4–1 in the qualifying stages for the 2010 FIFA World Cup in South Africa.

== Honours ==
=== Kedah FA ===
- Malaysian Super League: 2006–07, 2007–08
- Malaysia Cup: 2007, 2008
- Malaysia FA Cup: 2007, 2008

=== ATM FA ===
- Malaysian Premier League: 2012
- Malaysian Cup: Runners-up 2012
- Malaysia Charity Shield: 2013

=== Individual ===
- Malaysian Super League Golden Boot: 2007–08, 2013
- 100Plus-Football Association of Malaysia National Football Awards Most Valuable Foreign Players: 2006–07, 2007–08
