= Sarawak FA State Football Team =

Malaysian football club

Sarawak FA
- Full name: Football Association of Sarawak State Football Team
- Nicknames: Ngap Sayot; Bujang Senang; The Crocs; Sarawak
- Founded: 1974; 52 years ago
- Dissolved: 2021
- Ground: Sarawak State Stadium; Sarawak Stadium
- Capacity: 26,000; 40,000
- Owner: Football Association of Sarawak
- League: Malaysia M3 League
- 2020: Season abandonment
- Website: www.sarawakfa.com.my
Home colours	Away colours

Sarawak FA State Football Team (Malay: Pasukan Bola Sepak Negeri Sarawak) was a football team which represented the Malaysian region (formerly state) of Sarawak from 1974. It was one of the state teams of the Malaysian football structure. The team's home matches used to be played at the Sarawak State Stadium, Kuching.

The team had won the Malaysia FA Cup in 1992, the old Malaysian Premier League in 1997 (which was Malaysian top-tier division league at the time) and the Malaysia Charity Shield in 1998. In 2013, the team won the second-tier division league, the Malaysia Premier League, in which they were promoted to the Malaysia Super League the following year.

The team last played in the third-tier Malaysia M3 League in 2020, but due financial constraints faced by FAS at the time, Sarawak FA did not register to compete in the Malaysia M3 League the following year. As the team did not compete in the 2021 Malaysia M3 league, many football fans in Malaysia saw this as the end to a once legendary team from Sarawak. Although there is a club, supported by FAS, which started to use the name Sarawak United, Sarawakian football purists only accepted the team as a "reincarnation" of the old Sarawak FA team.

== History ==
=== Early years ===
Early incarnations of the team really existed after the creation of the Crown Colony of Sarawak. Although there were football activities which existed in present-day Malaysian region of Sarawak before the World War I, most of the activities focused on local football league or cup competitions created by Europeans, mostly British, who settled in Sarawak at the time.

After the formation Malaysia in 1963, the team simply became known as the Sarawak State Football Team because it is a team funded by the Malaysian state government of Sarawak to compete and represent the state of Sarawak in the Malaysian football system. It was one of the 14 Malaysian state football teams that existed in the Malaysian football system before 2021. All the 14 Malaysian state teams operated just like the Sarawak State Football Team before 2021, in which they are not professional clubs but rather teams representing the Malaysian states or a Malaysian state football associations, funded by their respective state governments to compete in Malaysian football competitions. Outsiders who are not familiar with the Malaysian football system before 2020 would come to recognise these teams as state FA teams, hence Sarawak State Football Team was also known as Sarawak FA.

Despite already joining mainstream Malaysian football since the formation of the country in 1963, Sarawak State Football Team only competed in Malaysia national football tournaments for the first time in 1979. This was only after an individual known as Taha Ariffin made reforms to the association that governs football in Sarawak by creating the Football Association of Sarawak (FAS) in 1974.

=== Early years in the Malaysian Professional Football era ===
Under the management of Vest during the early years of the professional era of Malaysian football, the team went on win more trophies. This was also thanks to the huge investment made by FAS who assembled the squad. FAS' investment paid off during the early years as Sarawak were the most consistent side in Malaysia. Sarawak went on to win the Malaysian top division league title in 1997, known as the Malaysia Premier League. It was the greatest achievement by the Sarawak State Football Team to date.

Jalil would leave in 2003 and Sarawak State Football Team would begin its "era of uncertainty". Although the Sarawak State Football Team became one of the eight teams who formed the inaugural Malaysia Super League in 2004, it was relegated and thus played in the Malaysian second division in 2005.

=== Robert Alberts era second division "Invincibles" ===
Although Alberts' first stint was a less-than-memorable one due to the fact that the team had just been relegated, he was appointed midway through the 2011 season to replace Zaki Sheikh. Alberts did well to get the team promoted, but Sarawak relegated again at the end of the 2012 Super League season.

Despite playing in the second division in 2013, it did not deter the spirit of the team and Alberts stayed, being crowned second division champions in the same year. What made the success even sweeter was that the team completed the season campaign unbeaten, with the record of 18 wins and 4 draws in 22 games. For the feat, that season in the Malaysian football league would come to be known as the "Era of the Invincibles" for the Sarawak State Football Team. Fans would also praise Alberts for getting the locals to successfully team up with foreign import players such as Bosnian striker Muamer Salibašić and Cameroonian centre-back Guy Bwele. The very same team team also competed in the Malaysia FA Cup and Malaysia Cup, but was unable to win.

=== Life in the Malaysia Super League (2014–2017) ===
Owing to poor performances of the Sarawak State Football Team in 2015 Malaysia Super League, Alberts' contract was mutually terminated and was replaced by Fuad Grbešić. He acted as the team's interim coach until the end of the 2015 Super League season. Sarawak State Football Team narrowly escaped relegation. FAS felt that changes had to be made to keep the team in the Super League by appointing former Malaysia national team coach K. Rajagopal at the end of 2015. Rajagopal's stint at Sarawak did not last long either, as his contract was terminated on 7 May 2016 after the poor performances.

=== Decline ===
After playing in the Malaysian Super League from 2014, the team was relegated at the end of the 2017 season. Things got worse as they were again relegated, to the Malaysia M3 League, at the end of the 2019 season. What made the relegation a bitter pill to swallow was that the team was relegated after playing a play-off match and losing 1–3 against their crosstown rivals Kuching City FC.

=== Dissolution in 2021 ===
After being relegated to the Malaysian third division, FAS had tried to rebrand the Sarawak State Football Team as a feeder team to Sarawak United in 2020. Should the Sarawak State Football Team be rebranded as a feeder team, it would also be renamed Sarawak United II for the purpose of competing the in 2020 Malaysia M3 League season, but the name change was not approved by the Amateur Football League. The team hence went on to use the Sarawak FA name when they competed in 2020. In early 2021, FAS made the announcement that they will not register the Sarawak FA team to compete in the upcoming season, citing financial constraints. Many football fans in Malaysia saw this as the end to a once legendary team.

== Notable former players ==
Apart from Muamer Salibašić, and Bwele Sarawak had many notable players which their fans remembered fondly by fans throughout the years. Among them are James Yaakub, Rosli Akup, Affendi Julaihi, Jalil Ramli, Ramos Sari, Bobby Pian, Mohamad Ali Sapiee, former Scottish-born Australian imports John Hunter and Jeff Curran, former Australian imports such as David Evans (who used to be the longest serving import player in Malaysian football) and Alistair Edwards (who is currently a technical director for Johor Darul Ta'zim F.C.), former Malaysian national team striker Shamsurin Abdul Rahman and many more. Former legendary goalkeeper for the Sarawak FA State Football team of the 1990s Mazlan Wahid also made his name as the best goalkeeper in the country during his stint with the team, while Sarawakians can also be proud that Malaysian footballing legend Safee Sali had played for the team from 2005 to 2006. In recent years, Gilbert Cassidy, Joseph Kalang Tie and Shahrol Saperi were also considered legends of the team as well.

== Team nicknames and mascot ==
Sarawak was known as The Kenyalang, during the amateur era of Malaysian football. The Kenyalang is a common name by Malaysians for the Great Hornbill bird, which is synonymous with the Malaysian state of Sarawak. In the 1980s, the Black Cats was chosen as the team's pseudonym; however, following series of notorious crocodile attacks at heavily infested rivers in the state during the 1990s, the nick Bujang Senang is chosen to represent Sarawak's chivalric and ferocious play. The name is chosen after a legendary and notorious man-eating crocodile Bujang Senang, who is believed to reside at the Batang Lupar River in the Sri Aman Division. In 1988, under the coach Awang Mahyan Awang Mohamad, he introduced the slogan Ngap Sayot and brought the team to its first Malaysia Cup semi-final, defeating other teams deemed several times to be more stronger than Sarawak, such as Selangor, Kedah, Kuala Lumpur and Pahang. Several other themes then emerged, among them are Ngap Ajak and Tebang Bala Sidak. Recently, the Semangat 88 (Spirit of 88) theme is used alongside Ngap Sayot to emulate the success of the 1980s team.

== Stadiums ==
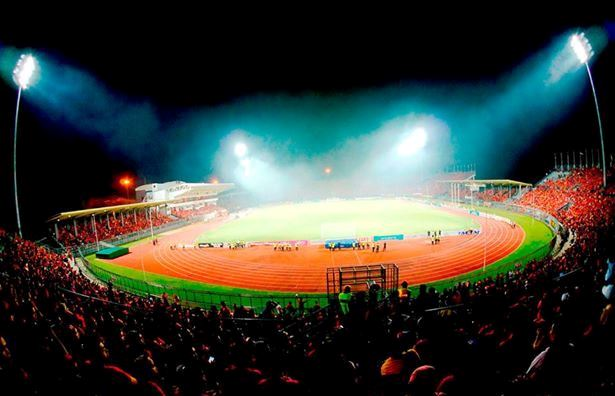
Sarawak State Stadium in Petra Jaya, Kuching during a Malaysia Cup semi-finals between Sarawak and Pahang in 2013.

The team's main home was the 26,000-seater Sarawak State Stadium (Malay: Stadium Negeri Sarawak) in Petra Jaya, Kuching. The team previously played at the Jubilee Ground (Malay: Padang Jubli) at Padungan Road, Kuching from 1974 until the mid-1980s, before moving to the new ground. Following facilities upgrade in 1989 for 1990 Sukma Games, the stadium remained as their base until 1997 when they moved to the new stadium after the 1997 FIFA World Youth Championship concluded.

== Crest and colours ==
The Lea Group of Companies through their sporting wing Lea Sports Centre, has been Sarawak's shirt sponsor since the 1990s. Previous sponsors include Bank Utama, Power (a brand by Bata), Inai Kiara, Holiday Inn, AirAsia, Larsen Oil & Gas and Naim Holdings, and currently, the team is sponsored by Sarawak Energy, Shin Yang, Ibraco Berhad, Marina Parkcity, Titanium Management, DD Plantations, HSL, Rimbunan Hijau and Lea Sports Centre. For the 2019 season, Malindo Air became corporate partner and official airline for the Sarawak team.

=== Sponsorship ===
Season	Manufacturer	Sponsor
1992–2000	(Italy) Lotto	Dunhill
2001–2004	(Trinidad and Tobago) Rossi	Dunhill
2005	(Trinidad and Tobago) Rossi	TMnet
2005–2006	(Trinidad and Tobago) Rossi	Celcom
2006–2007	(Trinidad and Tobago) Rossi	TM
2007–2008	(Trinidad and Tobago) Rossi	TM
2009	(Trinidad and Tobago) Rossi	Streamyx
2010	(Germany) Adidas	TM
2011–2013	(Malaysia) Starsport	Naim Holdings
2014–2016	(Malaysia) Starsport	Sarawak Energy
2016	(Malaysia) Starsport	Marina ParkCity
2017	(Malaysia) Starsport	Sarawak Energy
2018	(Malaysia) Starsport	none
2019	(Malaysia) Starsport	Press Metal
2020	(Spain) Joma	Harini Sdn.Bhd

== Honours ==
Titles	Winners	Runners-up
Malaysia Cup		1999
Liga Perdana (1x)	1997	
Liga Premier (1x)	2013	2011
Malaysia FA Cup (1x)	1992	1996, 2001
Malaysian Charity Shield (1x)	1998	1993
Borneo Cup (7x)	1965, 1966, 1969, 1981, 1982, 1983, 1986	

== Club records ==
As of 14 February 2020

Note:

- P = Played, W = Win, D = Draw, L= Loss, F = Goal for, A = Goal against, Pts = Points, Pos = Position

1st or Champions 2nd or Runner-up 3rd place Relegation

Season	League									Cup			Asia	
Season	Division	Pld	W	D	L	F	A	Pts	Pos	Charity	Malaysia	FA	Competition	Result
2004	Super League	21	3	7	11	28	38	16	7th	–	1st round	Group stage	–	–
2005	Premier League	21	3	5	13	23	38	14	7th	–	1st round	Not qualified	–	–
2005–06	Premier League	21	8	6	7	40	39	30	4th	–	Quarter-finals	Quarter-finals	–	–
2006–07	Super League	24	2	4	18	28	65	10	12th	–	1st round	Group stage	–	–
2007–08	Super League	24	4	2	18	25	67	14	13th	–	2nd round	Group stage	–	–
2009	Premier League	24	3	6	15	29	57	15	12th	–	2nd round	Group stage	–	–
2010	Premier League	22	11	4	7	42	34	37	6th	–	2nd round	Not qualified	–	–
2011	Premier League	22	15	3	4	51	16	48	2nd	–	1st round	Group stage	–	–
2012	Super League	26	8	6	12	28	32	30	11th	–	1st round	Group stage	–	–
2013	Premier League	22	18	4	0	49	12	58	1st	–	Semi-finals	Quarter-finals	–	–
2014	Super League	22	9	3	10	26	31	30	7th	–	Group stage	Quarter-finals	–	–
2015	Super League	18	3	5	10	21	33	14	10th	–	Quarter-finals	1st round	–	–
2016	Super League	22	6	6	10	32	40	24	8th	–	Group stage	2nd round	–	–
2017	Super League	22	5	6	11	24	34	21	11th	–	Group stage	Quarter-finals	–	–
2018	Premier League	20	6	4	10	27	35	22	8th	–	Not qualified	2nd round	–	–
2019	Premier League	20	4	4	12	25	44	16	11th	–	Semi-finals	2nd round	–	–

=== Malaysia Cup records ===
Sarawak FA Malaysia Cup Records
Champion / Year	Result	Pld	W	D	L	F	A
(Straits Settlements) 1921 to (Straits Settlements) 1933	did not enter						
(Straits Settlements) 1934 to (Perak) 1967	did not enter						
(Selangor) 1968 to (Selangor) 1978	did not enter						
(Selangor) 1979	First Entered	-	-	-	-	-	-
(Singapore) 1980 to (Kuala Lumpur) 1987	Unknown record						
(Kuala Lumpur) 1988	Semi-final	20	8	7	5	23	17
(Kuala Lumpur) 1989	Quarter-final	17	7	3	7	20	43
(Kedah) 1990 to (Perak) 1998	Unknown record						
(Brunei) 1999	Runner-up	-	-	-	-	-	-
(Perak) 2000	Semi-final	10	5	2	3	15	10
(Terengganu) 2001	Group stage	6	2	1	3	7	11
(Selangor) 2002	Group stage	6	3	0	3	10	11
(Selangor) 2003	Quarter-final	8	3	3	2	15	12
(Perlis) 2004	Group stage	6	3	0	3	15	12
(Selangor) 2005	did not enter						
(Perlis) 2006	Quarter-final	8	4	3	1	11	5
(Kedah) 2007	Group stage	9	2	2	5	17	23
(Kedah) 2008	Group stage	10	0	7	17	24	5
(Negeri Sembilan) 2009	Group stage	6	0	0	6	1	26
(Kelantan) 2010	did not enter						
(Negeri Sembilan) 2011	Group stage	6	1	0	5	2	11
(Kelantan) 2012	Group stage	6	2	1	3	10	13
(Pahang) 2013	Semi-final	10	4	3	3	13	5
(Pahang) 2014	Group stage	6	1	2	3	6	9
(Selangor) 2015	Quarter-final	6	2	2	2	5	7
(Kedah) 2016	Group stage	6	0	2	4	4	13
(Johor) 2017	Group stage	6	1	2	3	6	12

=== Malaysia FA Cup records ===
Sarawak FA Cup Records
Champion / Year	Result
(Selangor) 2009	Second round
(Negeri Sembilan) 2010	Second round
(Terengganu) 2011	First round
(Kelantan) 2012	First round
(Kelantan) 2013	Quarter-final
(Pahang) 2014	Quarter-final
(Singapore) 2015	Second round
(Johor) 2016	Second round
(Kedah) 2017	First round
(Pahang) 2018	First round
(Kedah) 2019	Second round

=== Malaysia Challenge Cup records ===
Champion / Year	Result	Pld	W	D	L	F	A
(Terengganu) 2018	Group stage	6	0	1	5	3	14
(Johor) 2019	Semi-final	4	1	1	2	3	6

=== Performances in AFC competitions ===
- Asian Cup Winners' Cup: 2 appearance

1993–94: Withdrew
1999: Quarter-final

Season	Competition	Round	Opponent	Home	Away
1993–94	Asian Cup Winners' Cup	First round	(Vietnam) Cảng Sài Gòn	(w/o)^{1}	
1998–99	Asian Cup Winners' Cup	First round	(Vietnam) Ho Chi Minh City Customs	3–1	2–1
1998–99	Asian Cup Winners' Cup	Second round	(Myanmar) Yangon City Development	3–0^{2}	1–0
1998–99	Asian Cup Winners' Cup	Quarter-finals	(Japan) Kashima Antlers	2–4	0–10^{3}

^{1} Sarawak FA withdrew

^{2} Yangon City Development were unable to field a team for the second leg due to player illness.

^{3} The squad was not prepared to face the cold weather which reached up to 3 °C. Even more surprising is that Sarawak does not have long-sleeved jerseys and the players have to wear two to three layers of shirts. The situation makes it difficult for players to perform more smoothly and comfortably.

== Individual player awards ==
=== M-League top goalscorers ===
Season	Player	Goals
2009	(Malaysia) Joseph Kalang Tie	11
2009	(Malaysia) Zamri Morshidi	10
2011	(Malaysia) Bobby Gonzales	15
2011	(Malaysia) Zamri Morshidi	11
2011	(Malaysia) Ashri Chuchu	8
2012	(Malaysia) Ashri Chuchu	4
2014	(Malaysia) S. Chanturu	6
2015	(Republic of Ireland) Billy Mehmet	15
2016	(Australia) Ndumba Makeche	10
2017	(Croatia) Mateo Roskam	9
2018	(Malaysia) Bobby Gonzales	15
2019	(Malaysia) Bobby Gonzales	9

== Players (2020) ==
Note: Flags indicate national team as defined under FIFA eligibility rules; some limited exceptions apply. Players may hold more than one non-FIFA nationality.

No.	Pos.	Nation	Player
1	GK	MAS	Ahmad Uzair Zaidil
3	DF	MAS	Sugunthan a/l Maniam
4	DF	MAS	Asrin Kalam
5	DF	MAS	Shukor Sulaiman
6	DF	MAS	Muhamad Alif Najmi Ahmad
7	DF	MAS	Mohd Hashim Shamsudin
8	DF	MAS	Dalglish Papin
9	DF	MAS	Ahrasu Ananthan
10	DF	MAS	Ronan Chaong Ak Tambat
11	MF	MAS	Nashrul Shazrin Roslan
12	MF	MAS	Sulaiman Jamali
13	MF	MAS	Fauzan Dzulkifli
14	FW	MAS	Nor Mohd Hafizz Nor Azam
15	FW	MAS	Amar Muaz Zamri
16	FW	MAS	Azrizan Ahmad

No.	Pos.	Nation	Player
17	FW	MAS	Abdi Effendi Mukhrijen
18	MF	CGO	Ushindi Baraka
19	FW	MAS	Nursalam Zainal Abidin
20	MF	MAS	Nur Areff Kamaruddin (captain)
21	FW	MAS	Wan Zulhilmi Wan Mustafa
22	FW	UGA	Denis Amadire
23	MF	MAS	Mohd Hafizie Erwinshah
24	MF	MAS	Nizam Abu Bakar
25	GK	MAS	Ayyub Hakimi Saiful Affendi
26	MF	MAS	Shazlan Zaidin
27	DF	UGA	Omar Hitimana
28	FW	MAS	Hattaphon Bun An
29	FW	CGO	Ntambwe Papy
30	FW	SMR	Matteo Vitaioli
99	GK	MAS	Navind Raj a/l Gnanasegaran

== Final staff ==
As of 10 June 2020

Position	Name
Head coach	(Uganda) Sam Timbe
Assistant coach	
Goalkeeping coach	(Malaysia) Mohd Faiz Abdul Khalid
Fitness coach	(Malaysia) Jerry Tanny Raymond
Physiotherapist	(Malaysia) Mohd Fikri Enidzullah
Kitman	(Malaysia) Muhd Sufyan Mohd Husin
Masseur	(Malaysia) Wan Bujang Wan Othman

== Head coach history ==
- (Malaysia) Poasa Sahar (1979–1981)
- (Malaysia) Edrus Alwi (1982)
- (Australia) Alan Bradshaw (1983)
- (Malaysia) Chow Kwai Lam (1984)
- (Malaysia) Che Su (1985–1987)
- (Malaysia) Mahyan Mohammad (1988–1989)
- (Malaysia) Wahet Uji (1990–1991, 2005)
- (New Zealand) Alan Vest (1992–1998)
- (Malaysia) Jalil Rambli (1999–2003, 2005–2006)
- (England) Trevor Morgan (2004)
- (Malaysia) Pengiran Bala (2007, 2017–2018)
- (Malaysia) Mohammad Mentali (2007–2008)
- (Singapore) Kunju Jamaluddin (2008)
- (Malaysia) Fairuz Yunus (2008)
- (Netherlands) Robert Alberts (2008–2009, 2011–2015)
- (Malaysia) Zaki Sheikh (2009–2011)
- (Malaysia) K. Rajagopal (2015)
- (Malaysia) David Usop (2016–2017)
- (Australia) Ian Gillan (2018)
- (Malaysia) Pengiran Bala (2018)
- (Malaysia) Mohd Farhan Abdullah (2019)
- (Uganda) Sam Timbe (2020)

=== Head coaches with honours ===
The following coaches won at least one trophy when in charge of Sarawak:

Name	Period	Trophies
(New Zealand) Alan Vest	1992–1998	1992 Malaysia FA Cup, 1997 Premier League, 1998 Malaysia Charity Shield
(Netherlands) Robert Alberts	2011–2015	2013 Premier League

== See also ==
- Sarawak FA President and Youth
