= TM F.C. =

Telekom Malaysia FC
- Full name: Telekom Malaysia Football Club
- Founded: 1994; 32 years ago as Telekom Melaka FC; 2005; 21 years ago as TM FC
- Dissolved: 22 September 2007; 19 years ago
- Ground: MPPJ Stadium
- Capacity: 25,000
- Owner: Telekom Malaysia (TM)
Home colours	Away colours

Telekom Malaysia Football Club, commonly known as TMFC, was a Malaysian professional football club which originated from Malacca, until the club moved their base to Kuala Lumpur. The club's final home ground was the 25,000 capacity MPPJ Stadium. The club used to play in the top division of the Malaysian football league system, the Malaysia Super League, until the 2006–07 Malaysia Super League. The club was owned by Telekom Malaysia. Their regular kit colours were orange and blue.

== History ==
Telekom Malaysia Football Club was founded as Telekom Melaka Football Club in 1994. They competed in the Malaysia FAM Cup until the end of 1998, winning it in 1996. They also qualified for the Malaysia FA Cup in 1997 and 1998.

In 1999, the club was promoted to the Malaysia Premier League 2. They finished the season in eight place, and continued to compete in the league until 2002. In 2003, the club was promoted to the Malaysia Premier League 1 as runner-up of the 2002 Malaysia Premier League 2. In 2004, the club was put into the new second-tier Malaysia Premier League, The club then won promotion to the 2005–06 Malaysia Super League, before withdrawing at the end of 2006–07 Malaysia Super League season. Telekom Malaysia submitted its application for the TM FC to exit from the Malaysian League as the company decided to realign its position in contributing towards the nation's sports development.

== Stadium ==
TM FC played their final season at MPPJ Stadium. The previous home grounds were Hang Tuah Stadium and Hang Jebat Stadium.

== Honours ==
=== Domestic ===
- Malaysia FAM League

Winners (1): 1996
