= Malaysia Premier League =

Liga Premier
- Organising body: Malaysian Football League
- Founded: 2004; 22 years ago
- Folded: 2022; 4 years ago
- Country: Malaysia
- Level on pyramid: 2
- Promotion to: Malaysia Super League
- Relegation to: Liga FAM (2005–2018); Liga M3 (2019–2022)
- Domestic cup(s): Malaysia FA Cup; Malaysia Cup; MFL Challenge Cup
- Last champions: Johor Darul Ta'zim FC II (1st title) (2022)
- Most championships: Felda United; Kedah; PDRM (2 titles)
- Top scorer: Bobby Gonzales (90)

The Malaysia Premier League (Malay: Liga Premier) was the second-tier professional football league in Malaysia. It replaced the Liga Perdana 2 in the Malaysian football league system.

The Malaysia Premier League was contested by 12 clubs. The season usually ran from early February to late October, with a Ramadan break depending on the Islamic calendar. Clubs played 22 matches (home and away), totalling 132 matches in the season. Most games were played on Fridays, with a few games played during weekdays. The league operated on a system of promotion and relegation with promotion to the Malaysia Super League and relegation to the Malaysia M3 League.

In 2015, the Football Malaysia Limited Liability Partnership (FMLLP) - later known as the Malaysia Football League (MFL) - was created in the course of the privatisation of the Malaysian football. The partnership saw all 24 clubs of the Malaysia Super League and the Malaysia Premier League, including the Football Association of Malaysia (FAM) as a managing partner and MP & Silva as a special partner, to become stakeholders.

The 2022 was the final season of the Premier League, as it was discontinued in favour of an expanded Super League, and a future second-tier league. From the 2016 to the 2018 season, the league was known as the 100PLUS Liga Premier for sponsorship reasons. The last champions were Johor Darul Ta'zim FC II.

== History ==
=== Origin ===
The Football Association of Malaysia (FAM) decided to privatise the Malaysian League from the 2004 season onwards where the Malaysia Super League and Malaysia Premier League were formed. Teams in Liga Perdana 1 and Liga Perdana 2 were then put through a qualification and playoff phase to be promoted into the Malaysia Super League. Teams that failed to qualify were put into the new second-tier league, the Malaysia Premier League.

Liga Perdana 1 was the nation's top-tier league from 1994 until 2003 when it was then succeeded by the formation of a new professional football league, the Malaysia Super League in 2004 formed by the Football Association of Malaysia. Liga Perdana 2 was replaced by the new Malaysia Premier League where the teams were divided into two different groups.

The inaugural season for the new second-tier league started in 2004 with 18 teams divided into 2 said groups.

Between 2004 and 2006, the Malaysia Premier League was divided into two groups of 8 teams, with the number changing due to some teams withdrawing:

- First Division: Malaysia Super League
- Second Division: Malaysia Premier League Group A
- Second Division: Malaysia Premier League Group B

At the end of the season, the top team from each group of the Malaysia Premier League were promoted to the Malaysia Super League. The teams that finished at the bottom of each group were relegated to the Malaysia FAM League. The two group champions also faced-off to determine the Malaysia Premier League champion.

=== 2007 league revamp as a single group ===
For the 2006-07 season, the Malaysia Premier League was reorganised into a single division of 11 teams instead of being a competition involving two separate groups of teams. There were a fewer number of teams due to more teams being promoted to the Malaysia Super League, as part of that league's expansion, while some others withdrew from the Malaysia Premier League.

From 2007 onwards, the Malaysia Premier League was combined into one single league.

- First Division: Malaysia Super League
- Second Division: Malaysia Premier League

=== 2010 league season with 12 teams ===
Over the years since its formation, the league has witnessed numerous changes to its format in order to accommodate the changes to the rules and number of teams competing in the league, only since the 2010 season was when the number of teams competing was stabilised to 12 teams.

In 2015, the Football Malaysia Limited Liability Partnership (FMLLP) was created in the course of the privatisation of the Malaysian football league system. The partnership saw all 24 teams of the Malaysia Super League and the Malaysia Premier League including the Football Association of Malaysia (FAM) as the Managing Partner and MP & Silva as a special partner (FAM's global media and commercial advisor) to become stakeholders in the company. The company owned, operated and ran five entities in Malaysian football under its jurisdiction, which included the Malaysia Super League, the Malaysia Premier League, the Malaysia FA Cup, the Malaysia Cup and the Piala Sumbangsih. It aimed to transform and move Malaysian football forward.

=== End of Premier League ===
MFL has announced in 2022 that it will be discontinuing the league in favour of an expanded Super League from 2023 and a future second-tier semi-professional league replacing the Premier League, meaning that 2022 season is to be the final season of the Premier League in its current form. Excluding feeder teams and FAM-MSN Project team, which will be shifted into the Reserve League, the remaining 6 teams from the 2022 season will have the chance to be promoted to the 18-team 2023 Malaysia Super League at the end of the season, either automatically (top 4 teams) or through playoffs with the top 2 2022 Malaysia M3 League teams (bottom 2 teams). Late in 2022 though, it was decided by MFL to cancel the playoffs and promote all the non-feeder teams to 2023 Super League, as teams from M3 League have failed in their Super League licence application.

== Club licensing regulations ==
Every team in the Malaysia Premier League must have a licence to play in the league, or risk getting relegated from the league. To obtain a licence, teams must be financially healthy and meet certain standards of conduct such as organizational management. As part of the privatisation efforts for the Malaysian Football League, all clubs competing in the Malaysia Super League and Malaysia Premier League are required to obtain FAM Club Licensing.

As a preliminary preparation towards the total privatisation of the league, FAM Club Licensing Regulations was created with the hope of it being enforced throughout the Malaysia Super League fully by the end of 2018 and the Malaysia Premier League by end of 2019.

=== Privatisation of the league's football clubs ===
In November 2016, the Melaka United Soccer Association became the third FAM affiliate to separate itself from the management of its football team with a separate entity called Melaka United F.C. from the 2017 Malaysia Super League season onwards. The first two being the Pahang Football Association with Pahang F.C. and the Johor Football Association with Johor Darul Ta'zim F.C. in early 2016.

State football associations such as the Johor Football Association shifted its focus to state football development and managing their own state league, the Johor Darul Taʼzim League.

In February 2017, the FMLLP released a statement regarding the official status of Johor Darul Ta'zim F.C. and Johor Darul Ta'zim II F.C. where Johor Darul Ta'zim II became an official feeder club to Johor Darul Ta'zim F.C. when the feeder club agreement between both clubs was approved on 19 August 2016. Through the agreement, both clubs were allowed an additional four player transfer quota which can be used outside of the normal transfer windows for players between both clubs. The feeder club was also required to register a minimum of 12 players under the age of 23 for its squad from 2017 onwards. A feeder club will be required to be in the league below the main club at all times which meant that Johor Darul Ta'zim II will never be allowed promotion even if the club won the Malaysia Premier League. By 2018, a feeder club must field four players under the age of 23 in their first eleven during match days and a feeder club is not allowed to play in other cup competitions where the parent club competes in such as the Malaysia FA Cup and the Malaysia Cup.

== Logo evolution ==
Since the inception of the league as the second-tier league in 2004, numerous logos had been introduced for the league to reflect sponsorships. In its inaugural season, the Dunhill logo was incorporated as a title sponsor and it was the only season sponsored by the tobacco company before tobacco advertising was banned in the country.

From 2004 to 2010, the Malaysia Premier League incorporated the TM brand as part of its logo as the title sponsor. After the end of the TM sponsorship which lasted for seven consecutive years, FAM launched a new logo for the 2011 season, partnering with Astro Media. The Astro branding was incorporated as part of the Malaysia Premier League logo from the 2012 season, until the end of the 2014 season.

In the 2015 season, no title sponsor was incorporated and the league was sponsored by MP & Silva. For the 2016 season, a new logo was introduced as part of takeover by the FMLLP, when 100PLUS was announced as title sponsor.

== Sponsorship ==
Season	Sponsors	League Name
2004	Dunhill	Dunhill Liga Premier
2005–10	TM	TM Liga Premier
2011	No sponsor	Liga Premier
2012–14	Astro Media	Astro Liga Premier Malaysia
2015	No sponsor	Liga Premier Malaysia
2016–18	100PLUS	100PLUS Liga Premier Malaysia
2019–20	No sponsor	Liga Premier Malaysia

== Finances ==
The FMLLP introduced the merit-point system starting from the 2016 season. Points were awarded based on a team’s league position, progress in the Cup competitions (Malaysia FA Cup and Malaysia Cup) and the number of live matches shown. A point in the season’s Malaysian League was worth RM41,000.

The money is distributed twice per season. First during early in the season where the teams will receive a basic payment out of that particular year's league sponsorship and the second payment will be received at the end of the season where all merit-points have been calculated. For the 2016 season, the first basic payment consisted of a 30 percent cut out of the RM70 million in league sponsorship that equated to RM21 million which was distributed among the 24 teams of the Malaysia Super League and the Malaysia Premier League.

Teams in the Malaysian League have quite often been involved in financial problems as their spending was more than their revenue. The Professional Footballers Association of Malaysia (PFAM) is one of the active members in pursuing the issue of unpaid salaries. In January 2016, the PFAM president suggested a couple of solutions to promote financial sustainability on the competing teams' parts where the teams should make long-term investments by operating according to their budgets and requiring teams' wage bills to be no bigger than 60 percent of their total spending. Other suggestions included for the salaries to be deducted directly from team grants and winning prizes, for points to be deducted from teams experiencing payment issues, and a ruling that requires teams to settle all their late salary payments before the start of every new season.

In response to these issues, the FMLLP decided that starting from the 2016 season, football clubs would be given warnings with the deduction of three league points if they failed to pay a player's salary. If the problem persists, it will affect the licence of the clubs. When a club's licence is withdrawn, the team will not be able to compete in the next season. If a team doesn't adopt the right structure, they will be left behind and club licensing will be a problem for them, with the team ultimately dropping out from competing in the league.

Other than this, each team raises revenue via sponsorship deals from local, regional and international sponsors for their team.

== Media coverage ==
Radio Televisyen Malaysia (RTM), a free-to-air broadcaster had been broadcasting the Malaysian League for years even before the formation of the Malaysia Premier League. They continued to broadcast the league for the most part exclusively until the end of the 2010 season where Astro Media were announced as sponsors and were contracted to manage the broadcasting rights of the league for four years spanning from 2011 until the 2014 seasons. During this time, the league was broadcast on one of the cable channels of Astro Media, which was Astro Arena alongside RTM where it showed free-to-air broadcasts. In 2015, Astro Media lost the broadcasting rights to the league where the rights were given to Media Prima, a parent company of multiple free-to-air channels alongside the broadcast with RTM. In 2016, RTM stopped broadcasting the Malaysia Premier League. However, the broadcasting rights for the 2016 season were given to Media Prima for 3 years with a maximum of three games in each gameweek shown live on television.

In 2019, MyCujoo won the Malaysia Premier League broadcasting rights for the 2019 season, with MyCujoo airing up to 3 games per week and in 2020, aired all 66 games of the season that was truncated due to the COVID-19 pandemic.

Although the broadcasting rights were held by the broadcasters, Malaysia Premier League matches have not been shown live for a quite some time as most of the production is fully utilised for Malaysia Super League matches. As a result, matches from the Malaysia Premier League most of the time are only shown as highlights for sports news segments on local television.

Season	TV Broadcasters
2004–2015, 2018	RTM
2005, 2015–2017	Media Prima (TV3, NTV7 (2005 only), TV9)
2011–14	Astro Arena
2019–2020	Mycujoo

== Champions ==
Since the inception of the Malaysia Premier League as a second-tier league in 2004, Kedah, PDRM FA and Felda United are the most successful Malaysia Premier League teams with two titles.

Season	Champions	Runners-up
Malaysia Premier League
2004	MPPJ	Telekom Melaka
2005	Selangor	Negeri Sembilan
2005–06	Kedah	Malacca
2006–07	PDRM	UPB-MyTeam
2007–08	Kuala Muda Naza	PLUS
2009	Harimau Muda	Kuala Terengganu T-Team
2010	Felda United	Sabah
2011	PKNS	Sarawak
2012	Armed Forces	Pahang
2013	Sarawak	Sime Darby
2014	PDRM	Felda United
2015	Kedah	Penang
2016	Melaka United	PKNS
2017	Kuala Lumpur	Terengganu
2018	Felda United	MIFA
2019	Sabah	PDRM
2020	Penang	Kuala Lumpur
2021	Negeri Sembilan	Sarawak United
2022	Johor Darul Ta'zim FC II	Kelantan

=== Best performing teams ===
Table below is a list of the number of league winners since 2004.

#	Club	Titles
1	Felda United	2
1	Kedah	2
1	PDRM	2
2	Penang	1
2	Sabah	1
2	MPPJ	1
2	Selangor	1
2	Kuala Muda Naza	1
2	Harimau Muda	1
2	PKNS	1
2	Armed Forces	1
2	Sarawak	1
2	Melaka United	1
2	Kuala Lumpur	1
2	Negeri Sembilan	1
2	Johor Darul Ta'zim FC II	1

== Great honours ==
Great honours for the Malaysia Premier League are entitled to the team who have won 2 trophies (double) or 3 trophies (treble) in the same season. It covers the Malaysia Premier League, Malaysia FA Cup and the Malaysia Cup. As of 2021, only Selangor has achieved this feat.

=== Treble ===
Year	Teams	Titles
2005	Selangor	Liga Premier, Piala FA & Piala Malaysia

== Players ==
=== Golden Boot winners ===
Below is the list of golden boot winners of the Malaysia Premier League since its inception as a second-tier league in 2004.

Season	Player	Club	Goals
2004	(Argentina) Brian Fuentes	Selangor	25
2005	(Indonesia) Bambang Pamungkas	Selangor	23
2005–06	(Argentina) Gustavo Fuentes	Malacca	18
2006–07	(Croatia) Marin Mikac	UPB-MyTeam	13
2008	(Senegal) Mohamed Moustapha N'diaye	Kelantan	27
2009	(Malaysia) Haris Safwan Kamal	T-Team	24
2010	(Malaysia) Muhammad Zamri Hassan	PKNS	11
2011	(Malaysia) Mohd Fitri Omar	MP Muar	19
2012	(Malaysia) Khairul Izuan Abdullah	PDRM	23
2013	(Croatia) Karlo Primorac	Sime Darby	24
2014	(Republic of Ireland) Billy Mehmet	Kedah	23
2015	(Liberia) Francis Forkey Doe	Negeri Sembilan	17
2016	(Montenegro) Ilija Spasojević	Melaka	24
2017	(Malaysia) Guilherme de Paula	Kuala Lumpur	27
2018	(Brazil) Casagrande	Felcra	19
2019	(Montenegro) Žarko Korać	UKM	13
2020	(Brazil) Casagrande	Penang	9
2021	(Ghana) Jordan Mintah (Spain) Fernando Rodríguez	Terengganu II Johor Darul Takzim II	16
2022	(Liberia) Abu Kamara	Kuching City	11

=== Foreign players ===
The foreign players policy has changed multiple times since the league's inception. In 2009, FAM took a drastic measure when they changed the foreign players policy to banned them from playing in the league until 2011. Foreign players were only allowed be back to the league starting from the 2012 season onwards.

All foreign players must obtain International Transfer Certificate from their previous national football governing body that their previous clubs are affiliated to before they can be register with the FAM in order to play in the Malaysia Premier League.

- 2009–2011: foreign players banned.
- 2012: 2 foreign players.
- 2013: 3 foreign players.
- 2014: 4 foreign players and only 3 can be on the field at a time.
- 2015–2022: 4 foreign players including 1 Asian quota.

== See also ==
- List of Liga Premier seasons
