= FAM Football Awards =

Malaysian football awards

The Liga M Awards (Malay: Anugerah Liga M) are presented to the best football local and foreign players and coaches. They have been awarded since the 2005–06 Malaysia Super League season.

== Names ==
On 8 July 2026, the Malaysian Football League (MFL) announced that the National Football Awards (Malay: Anugerah Bola Sepak Kebangsaan) would be rebranded as the Liga M Awards (Malay: Anugerah Liga M), marking a new identity for the league's annual football awards ceremony.

Years	Names
2006–2025	National Football Awards
2026–present	Liga M Awards

== Sponsorship ==
Since the establishment of the National Football Awards, it has had title sponsorship rights sold to two companies; 100plus was the most recent title sponsor.

- 2005–2006: Coca-Cola (Coca-Cola FAM National Football Awards)
- 2007–present: 100plus (100plus National Football Awards)

=== List of current active award available ===
- Most Valuable Player award
- Best Goalkeeper award
- Best Defender award
- Best Midfielder award
- Best Striker award
- Best Foreign Player award
- Best Young Player award
- Golden Boots award
- Best Coach award
- Best Football award

== Players award ==
=== Most Valuable Player ===
For the Most Valuable Players award, it has a winner for both local and foreign players. From 2008 to 2011, only local players were involved, because FAM had banned foreign players from participating in M-League. Formerly known as Supermokh Most Valuable Player (2011), it is now known as the 'Most Valuable Player' award.

Season	Players	Teams
2006–07	(Malaysia) Shukor Adan (Saint Vincent and the Grenadines) Marlon James	Selangor FA Kedah FA
2007–08	(Malaysia) Helmi Eliza (Saint Vincent and the Grenadines) Marlon James (2)	Kedah FA
2009	(Malaysia) Indra Putra Mahayuddin	Kelantan FA
2010	(Malaysia) Norshahrul Idlan	Kelantan FA
2011	(Malaysia) Norshahrul Idlan (2)	Kelantan FA
2012	(Malaysia) Norshahrul Idlan (3)	Kelantan FA
2013	(Malaysia) Badhri Radzi	Kelantan FA
2014	(Malaysia) Khairulazhan Khalid	Pahang FA
2015	(Malaysia) Safiq Rahim	Johor Darul Ta'zim
2016	(Malaysia) Hazwan Bakri	(Selangor) Selangor FA
2017	(Malaysia) Baddrol Bakhtiar	Kedah FA
2018	(Malaysia) Safawi Rasid	Johor Darul Ta'zim
2019	(Malaysia) Safawi Rasid (2)	Johor Darul Ta'zim
2020	Not awarded due to COVID-19 pandemic	
2021	(Malaysia) Arif Aiman	Johor Darul Ta'zim
2022	(Malaysia) Arif Aiman (2)	Johor Darul Ta'zim
2023	(Malaysia) Arif Aiman (3)	Johor Darul Ta'zim
2024–25	(Malaysia) Arif Aiman (4)	Johor Darul Ta'zim
2025–26	(Malaysia) Afiq Fazail	Johor Darul Ta'zim

=== Goalkeeper ===
Formerly known as 'Most Favourite Goalkeeper' (2005–07), now the award is called the 'Best Goalkeeper Award'. Shown below are the winners of the best goalkeeper award, as chosen by Anugerah Bolasepak Kebangsaan.

Season	Player	Team
2005–06	(Malaysia) Syamsuri Mustafa	Terengganu FA
2006–07	(Malaysia) Helmi Eliza	Kedah FA
2007–08	(Malaysia) Helmi Eliza (2)	Kedah FA
2009	(Malaysia) Farizal Marlias	Perlis FA
2010	(Malaysia) Khairul Fahmi Che Mat	Kelantan FA
2011	(Malaysia) Khairul Fahmi Che Mat (2)	Kelantan FA
2012	(Malaysia) Khairul Fahmi Che Mat (3)	Kelantan FA
2013	(Malaysia) Khairul Fahmi Che Mat (4)	Kelantan FA
2014	(Malaysia) Khairulazhan Khalid	Pahang FA
2015	(Malaysia) Farizal Marlias (2)	Johor Darul Ta'zim
2016	(Malaysia) Khairul Fahmi Che Mat (5)	Kelantan FA
2017	(Malaysia) Ifwat Akmal	Kedah FA
2018	(Malaysia) Farizal Marlias (3)	Johor Darul Ta'zim
2019	(Malaysia) Farizal Marlias (4)	Johor Darul Ta'zim
2020	(Malaysia) Farizal Marlias (5)	Johor Darul Ta'zim
2021	(Malaysia) Farizal Marlias (6)	Johor Darul Ta'zim
2022	(Malaysia) Syihan Hazmi	Negeri Sembilan
2023	(Malaysia) Syihan Hazmi (2)	Johor Darul Ta'zim
2024–25	(Malaysia) Syihan Hazmi (3)	Johor Darul Ta'zim
2025–26	(Malaysia) Syihan Hazmi (4)	Johor Darul Ta'zim

=== Defender ===
Formerly known as Most Favourite Defender (2005–07), it is now known as 'Best Defender Award'. Shown below are the winners of the best defenders award, as chosen by Anugerah Bolasepak Kebangsaan.

Season	Player	Team
2005–06	(Malaysia) Khairul Anuar	Negeri Sembilan FA
2006–07	(Malaysia) Victor Andrag	Kedah FA
2007–08	(Malaysia) Victor Andrag (2)	Kedah FA
2009	(Malaysia) Aidil Zafuan	Negeri Sembilan FA
2010	(Malaysia) Aidil Zafuan (2)	Negeri Sembilan FA
2011	(Malaysia) Norhafiz Zamani	Negeri Sembilan FA
2012	(Malaysia) Aidil Zafuan (3)	ATM FA
2013	(Singapore) Baihakki Khaizan	(Singapore) LionsXII
2014	(Malaysia) Razman Roslan	Pahang FA
2015	(Malaysia) Aidil Zafuan (4)	Johor Darul Ta'zim
2016	(Malaysia) Rizal Ghazali	Kedah FA
2017	(Malaysia) Matthew Davies	Pahang FA
2018	(Malaysia) Shahrul Saad	Perak FA
2019	(Malaysia) Shahrul Saad (2)	Perak FA
2020	(Malaysia) Aidil Zafuan (5)	Johor Darul Ta'zim
2021	(Malaysia) Matthew Davies (2)	Johor Darul Ta'zim
2022	(Malaysia) Shahrul Saad (3)	Johor Darul Ta'zim
2023	(Malaysia) Azam Azmi	Terengganu
2024–25	(Malaysia) Feroz Baharudin	Johor Darul Ta'zim
2025–26	(Malaysia) Quentin Cheng	Selangor

=== Midfielder ===
Formerly known as Most Favourite Midfielder (2005–07), it is now known as 'Best Midfielder Award'. Shown below are the winners of the best midfielders award, as chosen by Anugerah Bolasepak Kebangsaan.

Season	Player	Team
2005–06	(Malaysia) Hardi Jaafar	(Malacca) Melaka Telekom
2006–07	(Malaysia) Fauzi Shaari	Kedah FA
2007–08	(Malaysia) Khyril Muhymeen	Kedah FA
2009	(Malaysia) Amri Yahyah	Selangor FA
2010	(Malaysia) Baddrol Bakhtiar	Kedah FA
2011	(Malaysia) Safiq Rahim	Selangor FA
2012	(Malaysia) Safiq Rahim (2)	Selangor FA
2013	(Malaysia) Badhri Radzi	Kelantan FA
2014	(Malaysia) Badhri Radzi (2)	Kelantan FA
2015	(Malaysia) Safiq Rahim (3)	Johor Darul Ta'zim
2016	(Malaysia) Safiq Rahim (4)	Johor Darul Ta'zim
2017	(Malaysia) Baddrol Bakhtiar (2)	Kedah FA
2018	(Malaysia) Safawi Rasid	Johor Darul Ta'zim
2019	(Malaysia) Mohamadou Sumareh	Pahang FA
2020	(Malaysia) Safawi Rasid (2)	Johor Darul Ta'zim
2021	(Malaysia) Baddrol Bakhtiar (3)	Kedah Darul Aman
2022	(Malaysia) Afiq Fazail	Johor Darul Ta'zim
2023	(Malaysia) Afiq Fazail (2)	Johor Darul Ta'zim
2024–25	(Malaysia) Paulo Josué	Kuala Lumpur City
2025–26	(Malaysia) Afiq Fazail (3)	Johor Darul Ta'zim

=== Striker ===
Formerly known as Most Favourite Striker (2005–07), it is now known as 'Best Striker Award'. Shown below are the winners of the best strikers award, as chosen by Anugerah Bolasepak Kebangsaan.

Season	Player	Team
2005–06	(Malaysia) Rudie Ramli	(Malacca) Melaka Telekom
2006–07	(Malaysia) Khalid Jamlus	Perak FA
2007–08	(Malaysia) Liew Kit Kong	(Kedah) Kuala Muda Naza
2009	(Malaysia) Indra Putra Mahayuddin	Kelantan FA
2010	(Malaysia) Norshahrul Idlan Talaha	Kelantan FA
2011	(Malaysia) Norshahrul Idlan Talaha (2)	Kelantan FA
2012	(Malaysia) Norshahrul Idlan Talaha (3)	Kelantan FA
2013	(Malaysia) Nor Farhan Muhammad	Kelantan FA
2014	(Malaysia) Nor Farhan Muhammad (2)	Terengganu FA
2015	(Malaysia) Amri Yahyah	Johor Darul Ta'zim
2016	(Malaysia) Hazwan Bakri	Selangor FA
2017	(Malaysia) Shahrel Fikri	(Perak) PKNP
2018	(Malaysia) Akhyar Rashid	Kedah FA
2019	(Malaysia) Safawi Rasid	Johor Darul Ta'zim
2020	(Malaysia) Shahrel Fikri	Perak FA
2021	(Malaysia) Arif Aiman	Johor Darul Ta'zim
2022	(Malaysia) Arif Aiman (2)	Johor Darul Ta'zim
2023	(Malaysia) Arif Aiman (3)	Johor Darul Ta'zim
2024–25	(Malaysia) Arif Aiman (4)	Johor Darul Ta'zim
2025–26	(Malaysia) Faisal Halim	Selangor

=== Best Foreign Player ===
The 'Best Foreign Player' award is dedicated for import players in the Malaysia football league.

Season	Players	Nationality	Teams/Club	League
2005–06	Christian Bekamenga	Cameroon	Negeri Sembilan FA	Super League
2007–08	Marlon James	Saint Vincent and the Grenadines	Kedah FA	Super League
2009	Not awarded			
2010	Not awarded			
2011	Not awarded			
2012	Marlon James (2)	Saint Vincent and the Grenadines	ATM FA	Premier League
2013	Marlon James (3)	Saint Vincent and the Grenadines	ATM FA	Super League
2014	Ali Ashfaq	Maldives	(Malaysia) PDRM FA	Premier League
2015	Luciano Figueroa	Argentina	Johor Darul Ta'zim	Super League
2016	Jorge Pereyra Díaz	Argentina	Johor Darul Ta'zim	Super League
2017	Liridon Krasniqi	Kosovo	Kedah FA	Super League
2018	Rufino Segovia	Spain	Selangor FA	Super League
2019	Diogo	Brazil	Johor Darul Ta'zim	Super League
2020	Not awarded due to COVID-19 pandemic			
2021	Romel Morales	Colombia	Kuala Lumpur City	Super League
2022	Bergson	Brazil	Johor Darul Ta'zim	Super League
2023	Bergson (2)	Brazil	Johor Darul Ta'zim	Super League
2024–25	Bergson (3)	Brazil	Johor Darul Ta'zim	Super League
2025–26	Bergson (4)	Brazil	Johor Darul Ta'zim	Super League

=== Best Young Player ===
Season	Players	Teams
2005–06	(Malaysia) Nor Farhan Muhammad	Terengganu FA
2006–07	(Malaysia) Zaquan Adha	Negeri Sembilan FA
2007–08	(Malaysia) Fadly Baharum	Kedah FA
2009	(Malaysia) Muslim Ahmad	(Malaysia) Harimau Muda
2010	(Malaysia) Khairul Fahmi Che Mat	Kelantan FA
2011	(Malaysia) Wan Zack Haikal	(Malaysia) Harimau Muda
2012	(Malaysia) Rozaimi Rahman	Sabah FA
2013	(Malaysia) Junior Eldstål	Sarawak FA
2014	(Malaysia) Farhan Roslan	Kedah FA
2015	(Malaysia) Matthew Davies	Pahang FA
2016	(Malaysia) Safawi Rasid	(Terengganu) T-Team
2017	(Malaysia) Adam Nor Azlin	Selangor FA
2018	(Malaysia) Safawi Rasid (2)	Johor Darul Ta'zim
2019	(Malaysia) Akhyar Rashid	Johor Darul Ta'zim
2020	Not awarded due to COVID-19 pandemic	
2021	(Malaysia) Arif Aiman	Johor Darul Ta'zim
2022	(Malaysia) Arif Aiman (2)	Johor Darul Ta'zim
2023	(Malaysia) Arif Aiman (3)	Johor Darul Ta'zim
2024–25	(Malaysia) Haqimi Azim	Kuala Lumpur City
2025–26	(Malaysia) Haziq Kutty Abba	Penang

=== Golden Boot Award ===
The Golden Boot award is awarded to the top scorer of Malaysia Super League in that particular season.

==== Malaysia Super League Golden Boot Award ====
Season	Players	Goals	Team
2005–06	(Guinea) Mandjou Keita	17	Perak FA
2006–07	(Malaysia) Khalid Jamlus (Guinea) Mandjou Keita (2)	15 21	Perak FA
2007–08	(Saint Vincent and the Grenadines) Marlon James	23	Kedah FA
2009	(Malaysia) Nizaruddin Yusof	18	Perlis FA
2010	(Malaysia) Ashari Samsudin	18	Terengganu FA
2011	(Malaysia) Abdul Hadi Yahya	20	Terengganu FA
2012	(Cameroon) Jean-Emmanuel Effa Owona (Liberia) Francis Doe	15	Negeri Sembilan FA Terengganu FA
2013	(Saint Vincent and the Grenadines) Marlon James (2)	16	ATM FA
2014	(Brazil) Paulo Rangel	16	Selangor
2015	(Mali) Dramane Traoré	20	(Malaysia) PDRM FA
2016	(Argentina) Jorge Pereyra Diaz	18	Johor Darul Ta'zim
2017	(Lebanon) Mohamad Ghaddar	23	Johor Darul Ta'zim
2018	(Spain) Rufino Segovia	19	Selangor
2019	(Liberia) Kpah Sherman	14	(Selangor) PKNS
2020	(Nigeria) Ifedayo Olusegun	12	Selangor
2021	(Nigeria) Ifedayo Olusegun (2)	26	Selangor
2022	(Brazil) Bergson	29	Johor Darul Ta'zim
2023	(Colombia) Ayron del Velle	23	Selangor
2024–25	(Brazil) Bergson (2)	32	Johor Darul Ta'zim
2025–26	(Brazil) Bergson (3)	27	Johor Darul Ta'zim

Malaysia A1 Semi-Pro League Golden Boots Award

Season	Players	Goals	Team
2019	(Malaysia) Fakhrul Zaman	28	Kelantan United
2022	(Malaysia) Firdaus Azizul	22	(Kuala Lumpur) Immigration
2023	(Malaysia) Azim Rahim	24	(Kuala Lumpur) Immigration
2024–25	(Malaysia) Azim Rahim (2)	22	(Malacca) Melaka
2025–26	(Cameroon) Emmanuel Mbarga	32	Kelantan Red Warrior

== Coaches award ==
Formerly known as Most Favourite Coach (2005–07), it is now known as 'Best Coach Award'.

Season	Coach	Team
2005–06	(Malaysia) K. Devan	Negeri Sembilan FA
2006–07	(Malaysia) Azraai Khor	Kedah FA
2007–08	(Malaysia) Azraai Khor (2)	Kedah FA
2009	(Malaysia) K. Devan (2)	Selangor FA
2010	(Malaysia) B. Sathianathan	Kelantan FA
2011	(Malaysia) Irfan Bakti	Terengganu FA
2012	(Malaysia) B. Sathianathan (2)	ATM FA
2013	(Malaysia) Dollah Salleh	Pahang FA
2014	(Malaysia) Zainal Abidin Hassan	Pahang FA
2015	(Argentina) Mario Gómez	Johor Darul Ta'zim
2016	(Malaysia) Tan Cheng Hoe	Kedah FA
2017	(Malaysia) B. Sathianathan (3)	(Pahang) Felda United
2018	(Australia) Mehmet Duraković	Perak
2019	(Malaysia) Dollah Salleh (2)	Pahang
2020	(Mexico) Benjamín Mora	Johor Darul Ta'zim
2021	(Croatia) Bojan Hodak	Kuala Lumpur City
2022	(Malaysia) Nafuzi Zain	Terengganu
2023	(Malaysia) Tan Cheng Hoe (2)	Selangor
2024–25	(Singapore) Aidil Sharin Sahak	(Sarawak) Kuching City
2025–26	(Spain) Xisco Muñoz	Johor Darul Ta'zim

== Team of the Season award ==
Team of the Season award is named from 2019 season onwards by Anugerah Bolasepak Kebangsaan.

Season	Goalkeepers	Defenders	Midfielders	Forwards
2019	(Malaysia) Ifwat Akmal	(Malaysia) La'Vere Corbin-Ong (Brazil) Renan Alves (Singapore) Shakir Hamzah (Malaysia) Rizal Ghazali	(Malaysia) Brendan Gan (Malaysia) Baddrol Bakhtiar (England) Lee Tuck	(Malaysia) Akyhar Rashid (Brazil) Diogo (Malaysia) Safawi Rasid
2021	(Philippines) Kevin Ray Mendoza	(Malaysia) La'Vere Corbin-Ong (Malaysia) Arif Fadzilah (Brazil) Renan Alves (Malaysia) Rizal Ghazali	(Philippines) Manuel Ott (Malaysia) Zahfri Yahya (Argentina) Leandro Velázquez	(Argentina) Gonzalo Cabrera (Brazil) Bergson (Malaysia) Arif Aiman
2022	(Malaysia) Syihan Hazmi	(Malaysia) La'Vere Corbin-Ong (Australia) Shane Lowry (Malaysia) Shahrul Saad (Malaysia) Azam Azmi	(Philippines) Manuel Ott (Malaysia) Afiq Fazail (Argentina) Leandro Velázquez	(Malaysia) Faisal Halim (Brazil) Bergson (Malaysia) Arif Aiman
2023	(Malaysia) Syihan Hazmi	(Malaysia) La'Vere Corbin-Ong (Malaysia) Shahrul Nizam (Indonesia) Jordi Amat (Malaysia) Azam Azmi	(South Korea) Park Tae Su (Malaysia) Afiq Fazail (Argentina) Manuel Hidalgo	(Colombia) Ayron del Velle (Brazil) Bergson (Malaysia) Arif Aiman
2024–25	(Malaysia) Syihan Hazmi	(Malaysia) Feroz Baharudin (South Korea) Park Jun-heong (Malaysia) Jimmy Raymond	(Spain) Juan Muñiz (Malaysia) Nooa Laine (Malaysia) Danial Amier (Brazil) Nando Welter	(Malaysia) Faisal Halim (Brazil) Bergson (Malaysia) Arif Aiman
2025–26	(Malaysia) Haziq Nazli	(Nigeria) James Okwuosa (Azerbaijan) Eddy Israfilov (Malaysia) Rodney Celvin	(Namibia) Petrus Shitembi (Malaysia) Afiq Fazail (Malaysia) Danial Amier (Spain) Óscar Arribas	(Malaysia) Ramadhan Saifullah (Brazil) Bergson (Malaysia) Arif Aiman

=== Total awards ===
Rank	Player	Wins
1	(Brazil) Bergson	5
1	(Malaysia) Arif Aiman	5
2	(Malaysia) La'Vere Corbin-Ong	4
3	(Malaysia) Syihan Hazmi	3
3	(Malaysia) Afiq Fazail	3
4	(Malaysia) Azam Azmi	2
4	(Argentina) Leandro Velázquez	2
4	(Brazil) Renan Alves	2
4	(Malaysia) Rizal Ghazali	2
4	(Malaysia) Faisal Halim	2
4	(Malaysia) Danial Amier	2

== Clubs award ==
=== Best Football Club ===
Formerly known as Most Favourite Football Association (2005–06), it is now known as Best Football Association/Club Award.

Season	Team
2005–06	Selangor FA
2006–07	Not awarded
2007–08	Negeri Sembilan FA
2009	Johor FC
2010	Johor FC (2)
2011	(Selangor) PKNS
2012	(Malaysia) Sime Darby
2013	(Malaysia) Sime Darby (2)
2014	Johor Darul Ta'zim (3)
2015	Kedah FA
2016	Johor Darul Ta'zim (4)
2017	Kedah FA (2)
2018	Johor Darul Ta'zim (5)
2019	Johor Darul Ta'zim (6)
2020	Johor Darul Ta'zim (7)
2021	Johor Darul Ta'zim (8)
2022	Johor Darul Ta'zim (9)
2023	Johor Darul Ta'zim (10)
2024–25	Johor Darul Ta'zim (11)
2025–26	Johor Darul Ta'zim (12)

– Johor FC was rebranded as Johor Darul Ta'zim in 2014.

=== Fair Play award ===
Season	Team
2013	(Malaysia) PDRM FA
2014	Terengganu FA
2015	(Singapore) LionsXII
2016	Negeri Sembilan FA
2017	(Terengganu) T-Team
2018	(Malacca) Melaka United
2019	Terengganu II
2020	Not awarded
2021	Not awarded
2022	(Selangor) Petaling Jaya City
2023	Terengganu (2)
2024–25	Terengganu (3)
2025–26	(Malacca) Melaka

=== Best Supporter Clubs ===
Season	Team	Supporter Clubs
2005–06	Perak FA	Perak Supporters Club
2006–07	Perak FA (2)	Perak Supporters Club
2007–08	Perak FA (3)	Perak Supporters Club
2009	(Federal Territories of Malaysia) PLUS	(Federal Territories of Malaysia) The Highway Warriors
2010	Kedah FA	Ultras Kedah
2011	Selangor FA	(Selangor) UltraSel Curva
2012	ATM FA	The Gladiators
2013	Kelantan FA	(Kelantan) Ultras Red Warriors
2014	Johor Darul Ta'zim	(Johor) Boys Of Straits
2015	Pahang FA	(Pahang) Elephant Army
2016	Johor Darul Ta'zim (2)	(Johor) Boys Of Straits
2016	(Malacca) Melaka United	(Malacca) Ultras Taming Sari
2017	Kedah FA (2)	Ultras Kedah
2018	Johor Darul Ta'zim (3)	(Johor) Boys Of Straits
2019	Johor Darul Ta'zim (4)	(Johor) Boys Of Straits
2024–25	Johor Darul Ta'zim (5)	(Johor) Boys Of Straits
2025–26	Johor Darul Ta'zim (6)	(Johor) Boys Of Straits

== Others award ==
=== Best Social Media ===
Season	Team
2019	Johor Darul Ta'zim
2018	Johor Darul Ta'zim
2017	Kedah FA
2016	Johor Darul Ta'zim

=== Best Team's Website ===
Season	Team
2019	Johor Darul Ta'zim
2018	Johor Darul Ta'zim
2017	Selangor FA
2016	Johor Darul Ta'zim

=== Most Favourite Manager ===
This category no longer available since 2005–06.

Season	Manager	Team
2005–06	(Malaysia) Karim Yaacob	Malacca United

=== Most Favourite Sport Broadcaster ===
This category no longer available since 2005–06.

Season	Broadcaster
2005–06	Radio Televisyen Malaysia

=== FAM Special Award ===
Season	Receiver
2012	(Malaysia) Abdul Ghani Minhat & (Malaysia) Ee Hong
2013	(Malaysia) Datuk Seri Paul Mony, (Malaysia) Datuk Dell Akbar Khan, (Malaysia) Datuk Azzudin Ahmad & (Malaysia) Datuk Seri Ibrahim Saad
2015	Johor Darul Ta'zim
2016	(Malaysia) Penang FA Mohd Faiz Subri (FIFA Puskas Award 2016)
2016	(Malaysia) Ah Wa (Perak Supporter)
2020	(Malaysia) Malaysian League supporters – Most Valuable Players

Known as "Best Women Footballer"

Year	Name	Club
2018	(Malaysia) Nurul Azurin Mazlan	Sabah FA
2017	(Malaysia) Siti Rohani Saptu	Sarawak FA
2016	(Malaysia) Dadree Rofinus	(Malaysia) MISC-MIFA
2015	(Malaysia) Nurul Azurin Mazlan	Sabah FA

=== Futsal ===
Best Men Futsal Player

Year	Name	Club
2015	(Malaysia) Azrul Hadee Mohd Taufiq	(Malaysia) Felda United

Best Women Futsal Player

Year	Name	Club
2015	(Malaysia) Siti Asnidah Jamri	Selangor FA

== Discontinued award ==
=== Malaysia Premier League Golden Boots Award ===
Season	Players	Goals	Team
2015	(Liberia) Francis Forkey Doe	17	Negeri Sembilan FA
2016	(Montenegro) Ilija Spasojević	24	(Malacca) Melaka United
2017	(Brazil) Guilherme de Paula	27	Kuala Lumpur FA
2017	(Malaysia) Malik Ariff	15	(Kuala Lumpur) ATM FA
2018	(Brazil) Casagrande	19	(Kuala Lumpur) Felcra
2018	(Malaysia) Bobby Gonzales	13	Sarawak FA
2019	(Montenegro) Žarko Korać	13	(Kuala Lumpur) Felcra
2019	(Malaysia) Bobby Gonzales (2)	9	Sarawak FA
2020	(Brazil) Casagrande (2)	9	Penang FA
2020	(Malaysia) Danial Asri	7	Selangor II
2021	(Ghana) Jordan Mintah	16	(Terengganu) TFC II
2021	(Spain) Fernando Rodriguez	16	(Johor) JDT II
2021	(Malaysia) Nurshamil Abd Ghani	9	Kelantan
2022	(Liberia) Abu Kamara	11	(Sarawak) Kuching City

=== Most Popular Player ===
Tabulated below are the overall most favourite player selected by voting.

Season	Players	Team
2005–06	(Malaysia) Mohd Syamsuri Mustafa	Terengganu FA
2006–07	(Malaysia) K. Nanthakumar	Perak FA
2016	(Kosovo) Liridon Krasniqi	Kedah FA
2017	(Kosovo) Liridon Krasniqi (2)	Kedah FA
2018	(England) Lee Tuck	Terengganu
2019	(Malaysia) Safawi Rasid	Johor Darul Ta'zim

=== Best Asean Players ===
Season	Players	Nationality	Teams/Club	League
2018	Faris Ramli	Singapore	(Selangor) PKNS	Super League
2019	Hariss Harun	Singapore	Johor Darul Ta'zim	Super League

== Referee award ==
Formerly known as Most Favourite Referee (2005–06), it is now known as Best Referee. In some seasons, the assistant referees were also awarded with Best Assistant Referee.

Season	Referee Name	Assistant Referee Name
2005–06	(Malaysia) Kapten Abdul Halim Hamid	N/A
2013	(Malaysia) Nagor Amir Noor Mohamed	(Malaysia) Mohd Sabri Mat Daud
2014	(Malaysia) Nafeez Abdul Wahab	N/A
2019	(Malaysia) Tuan Mohd Yassin	N/A

== See also ==
- Football Association of Malaysia
