= Wan Zack Haikal =

Malaysian footballer

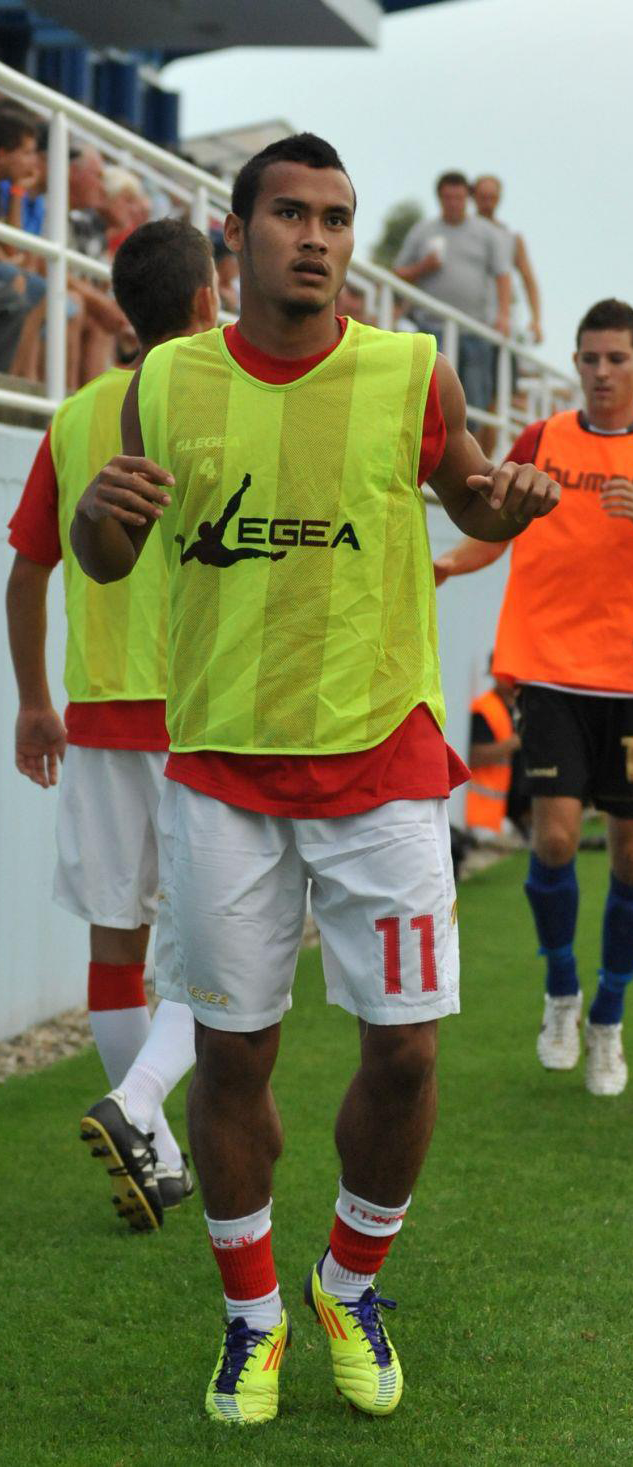
- Wan Zack Haikal with Perak in 2023

Personal information
- Birth name: Wan Zack Haikal bin Wan Noor
- Date of birth: 28 January 1991 (age 35)
- Place of birth: Pahang, Malaysia
- Height: 1.70 m (5 ft 7 in)
- Position: Midfielder

Team information
- Current team: Perak FA
- Number: 88

Youth career
- 2005–2006: Kuala Lumpur
- 2007–2008: Felda United

Senior career*
Years	Team	Apps	(Gls)
2007–2008	Harimau Muda		
2009	Felda United		
2009–2011	Harimau Muda		
2011	→ Zlaté Moravce (loan)	0	(0)
2012	Harimau Muda A	17	(5)
2013	FC Ryukyu	2	(0)
2014–2016	Kelantan	41	(7)
2017–2018	Felda United	32	(10)
2018–2021	Selangor	14	(0)
2022–2025	Perak	47	(7)
2025–2026	Penang	8	(0)
2026–	Perak FA		

International career^{‡}
2008–2010	Malaysia U-19		
2010–2013	Malaysia U-23	20	(2)
2012–	Malaysia	29	(4)
- * Club domestic league appearances and goals as of 7 January 2026 ‡ National team caps and goals as of 5 July 2018

Wan Zack Haikal bin Wan Noor (born 28 January 1991) is a Malaysian professional footballer who plays as a striker or midfielder, currently for Perak in the Malaysia A1 Semi-Pro League. He is also a member of the Malaysia national team.

== Club career ==
=== Kuala Lumpur President Cup Team ===
Wan Zack Haikal was born in Maran, Pahang. He attended a SMK Kuala Lanar, project school of Pahang FA at Kuala Lipis and later was chosen to join the Kuala Lumpur President Cup Team in 2005 at the age of 14. Even though the Kuala Lumpur President Cup Team did not manage to reach the finals, Wan Zack became the top scorer with 11 goals.

=== Felda United ===
After playing 2 years for the Kuala Lumpur President Cup Team, He was later scouted by former national team player, Reduan Abdullah and Reduan gave Wan Zack a one-year contract with the newly created Felda United in 2007 at the age of 17. He was the youngest player in the team.

=== Harimau Muda ===
Wan Zack joined Harimau Muda in 2008 under the management of K. Rajagopal and scored 1 league goal in his first stint. He returned to Felda United in the first half of the 2009 season, scoring 3 league goals. In the second half of the season, he rejoined Harimau Muda under the management of Ong Kim Swee. Harimau Muda won the 2009 Premier League with Wan Zack contributed 2 league goals. During the 2010 season, he briefly played in the Malaysia Premier League before a training camp in Slovakia. Harimau Muda was split into two teams and he was chosen to be in the A team. Wan Zack and 25 other Harimau Muda A players were chosen by Azraai Khor to participate in an 8-month long, training camp in Zlaté Moravce, Slovakia.

=== FC ViOn Zlaté Moravce (loan) ===
In September 2011, Slovak club FC ViOn Zlaté Moravce have confirmed the signings of Wan Zack. He joins the club on loan for 3 months until 30 October from Harimau Muda. Struck by a 4-month injury during a national duty for the national Olympic team, Haikal failed to make an appearance during his loan, only appearing in 1 unofficially friendly match with Zlaté Moravce.

=== Return to Harimau Muda ===
After his loaned finished, he returned to his club, Harimau Muda which was then competing in S. League. Previously, the team was competing in the Malaysia Super League for the 2011 season.

=== FC Ryukyu ===
Malaysian media reported in early March 2012 that Wan Zack, along with teammate Wan Zaharulnizam Zakaria is to attend trial with Japan Football League side FC Ryukyu after impressing the Japanese side talent spotter during Malaysia's 2–0 defeat to Japan in the 2012 Olympic qualifiers match in Tosu. They successfully completed the 2-week trial with the Japanese club in July. In March 2013, Wan Zack was officially offered a two-year contract, but Wan Zaharulnizam did not. Instead, 19-year-old Nazirul Naim Che Hashim was offered a contract instead. Wan Zack and Nazirul officially signed a two-year playing contract with FC Ryukyu in early April 2013. Wan Zack made his full debut in a 2–1 win against Sagawa Printing, playing 80 minutes before being subbed off.

=== Kelantan ===
Malaysian media reported in early March 2014 that Wan Zack will join Kelantan FA in April. He made his debut in the 2014 Malaysia Cup against Kedah on 3 October 2014. In 2015 he played 20 league matches scoring 2 goals. Overall he played 33 matches and scored 4 goals in all competition with Kelantan during 2015 season.

=== Felda United ===
After his contract with Kelantan is become to end, Wan Zack switch sides and joined FELDA United, signing a two-year contract on an undisclosed fee. He made his debut, playing 86-minutes on 21 January 2017 against PKNS in Super League matches, which FELDA United won by 1–0.

=== Selangor ===
After succeeded in helping FELDA United to become the 2018 Malaysia Premier League champions, Wan Zack signed a one-year contract, with the option for a second year, with Selangor. He joined the squad along with new coach B. Sathianathan, and other teammates K. Prabakaran, Azreen Zulkafali and Farizal Harun. However he missed the rest of season after suffering an anterior cruciate ligament injury. He made a return after almost 2 years in August 2020.

=== Perak ===
Wan Zack was released by Selangor after the end of 2021 season. He signed with Malaysia Premier League club, Perak in 2022. He helped Perak gain promotion to the top flight of the Malaysian league at the end of the 2022 season.

On 9 August 2023, Wan Zack got back to his phenomenal form providing a goal and an assist in a 3–1 win against Penang in the Malaysia Super League. In the second leg of the 2023 Malaysia Cup quarter-final match on 25 September 2023, Wan Zack scored the only goal in the game against Sabah bringing the tally to 3–2 on aggregate sending the team to the semi-finals.

=== Penang ===
On 9 June 2025, Wan Zack signed for Malaysia Super League club Penang leaving Perak after the club dissolved. He joined Penang on free transfer.

=== Return to Perak FA ===
On 29 January 2026, it was officially announced that Wan Zack Haikal had rejoined Perak FA for the remainder of the 2025–26 season. After a short stint with Penang FC in the Malaysia Super League, he returned to Ipoh to provide veteran leadership to the young Perak FA squad competing in the Malaysia A1 Semi-Pro League and the MFL Challenge Cup.

The President of the Perak Football Association (PAFA), Datuk Azhar Jamaluddin, stated that Wan Zack's experience would be vital in guiding the "Sukma generation" of players as they head into the quarter-finals of the MFL Challenge Cup against UM-Damansara United.

== International career ==
=== 2012 AFF Suzuki Cup ===
Wan Zack was called up for 2012 AFF Suzuki Cup. He played his first AFF Suzuki Cup match against Singapore after coming off the bench. Unfortunately, Malaysia loses 3–0 on home ground. Wan Zack played a big role in a match against Laos in which he provided a goal and an assist to help Malaysia win 4–1 on 28 November 2012 at the National Stadium, Bukit Jalil. Wan Zack showed excellent performance against Indonesia in the third match. He provided an assist to teammate Mahali Jasuli. Later, Wan Zack was injured in that match but Malaysia won 2–0 to progress to the semi-final. Wan Zack does not play on two semi-final match against Thailand due to injury. Malaysia failed to progress to final after losing 1–3 on aggregates.

== Career statistics ==
=== Club ===
As of match played 16 March 2023

Appearances and goals by club, season and competition
Club	Season	League (Note: Including Malaysia Charity Shield)			Cup		League Cup		Other (Note: Including AFC Champions League and AFC Cup)		Total	
Club	Season	Division	Apps	Goals	Apps	Goals	Apps	Goals	Apps	Goals	Apps	Goals
Harimau Muda	2008	Malaysia Premier League		1		0	–					1
Harimau Muda	Total			1		0	–					1
Felda United	2009	Malaysia Premier League		3		0	–					3
Felda United	Total			3		0	–					3
Harimau Muda	2009	Malaysia Premier League		2		0	–					2
Harimau Muda	2010	Malaysia Premier League		2		0	–					2
Harimau Muda	2011	Malaysia Super League	20	2		0	–					2
Harimau Muda	Total			6		0	–					6
Zlaté Moravce	2011–12	Corgon Liga	0	0	0	0	–				0	0
Zlaté Moravce	Total		0	0	0	0	–				0	0
Harimau Muda A	2012	S. League	17	5	–						17	5
Harimau Muda A	Total		17	5	–						17	5
FC Ryukyu	2013	Japan Football League	2	0	–						2	0
FC Ryukyu	Total		2	0	–						2	0
Kelantan	2014	Malaysia Super League	0	0	0	0	2	0	–		2	0
Kelantan	2015	Malaysia Super League	20	2	7	2	6	0	–		33	4
Kelantan	2016	Malaysia Super League	21	5	2	0	6	1	–		29	6
Kelantan	Total		41	7	9	2	14	1	–		64	10
Felda United	2017	Malaysia Super League	13	4	0	0	10	2	2	0	25	6
Felda United	2018	Malaysia Premier League	19	6	4	1	0	0	–		23	7
Felda United	Total		32	10	4	1	10	2	2	0	48	13
Selangor	2019	Malaysia Super League	–								0	0
Selangor	2020	Malaysia Super League	6	0	0	0	1	0	–		7	0
Selangor	2021	Malaysia Super League	8	0	–		5	1	–		13	1
Selangor	Total		14	0	0	0	6	1	–		20	1
Perak	2022	Malaysia Premier League	8	2	0	0	–				8	2
Perak	2023	Malaysia Super League	17	2	0	0	6	2	–		23	4
Perak	2024–25	Malaysia Super League	22	3	1	0	4	2	–		27	5
Perak	Total		47	7	1	0	10	4	0	0	58	11
Penang	2025–26	Malaysia Super League	8	0	0	0	3	0	0	0	11	0
Penang	Total		0	0	0	0	0	0	–		0	0

=== International ===
As of match played 5 July 2018

National team	Year	Apps	Goals
Malaysia
Malaysia	2012	9	3
Malaysia	2013	1	0
Malaysia	2014	0	0
Malaysia	2015	6	0
Malaysia	2016	3	0
Malaysia	2017	6	0
Malaysia	2018	4	1
Total		29	4

=== International goals ===
Scores and results list Malaysia's goal tally first.

#	Date	Venue	Opponent	Score	Result	Competition
1.	28 April 2012	Shah Alam Stadium, Shah Alam, Malaysia	Sri Lanka	1–0	6–0	Friendly
2.	28 April 2012	Shah Alam Stadium, Shah Alam, Malaysia	Sri Lanka	2–0	6–0	Friendly
3.	28 November 2012	Bukit Jalil National Stadium, Bukit Jalil, Malaysia	Laos	3–1	4–1	2012 AFF Championship
4.	1 April 2018	Bukit Jalil National Stadium, Bukit Jalil, Malaysia	Bhutan	1–0	7–0	Friendly

== Honours ==
Harimau Muda A

- Pestabola Merdeka : 2013
- Malaysia Premier League : 2009
- International U-21 Football Tournament Thanh Nien Cup : 2012

Kelantan FA

- Malaysia FA Cup: Runner-up 2015

Felda United

- Malaysia Super League Third place :2017
- Malaysia Premier League : 2018

Individual

- FAM Best Young Players Awards: 2011
- Merdeka Tournament's Most Valuable Player: 2013
- S.League Yeo's People's Choice Awards: 2012
- S.League Young Player of the Year: 2012
- Goal.com Asian Best XI: November 2012

== See also ==
- Harimau Muda A
- Malaysia national under-23 football team
