= Haris Safwan =

Malaysian footballer

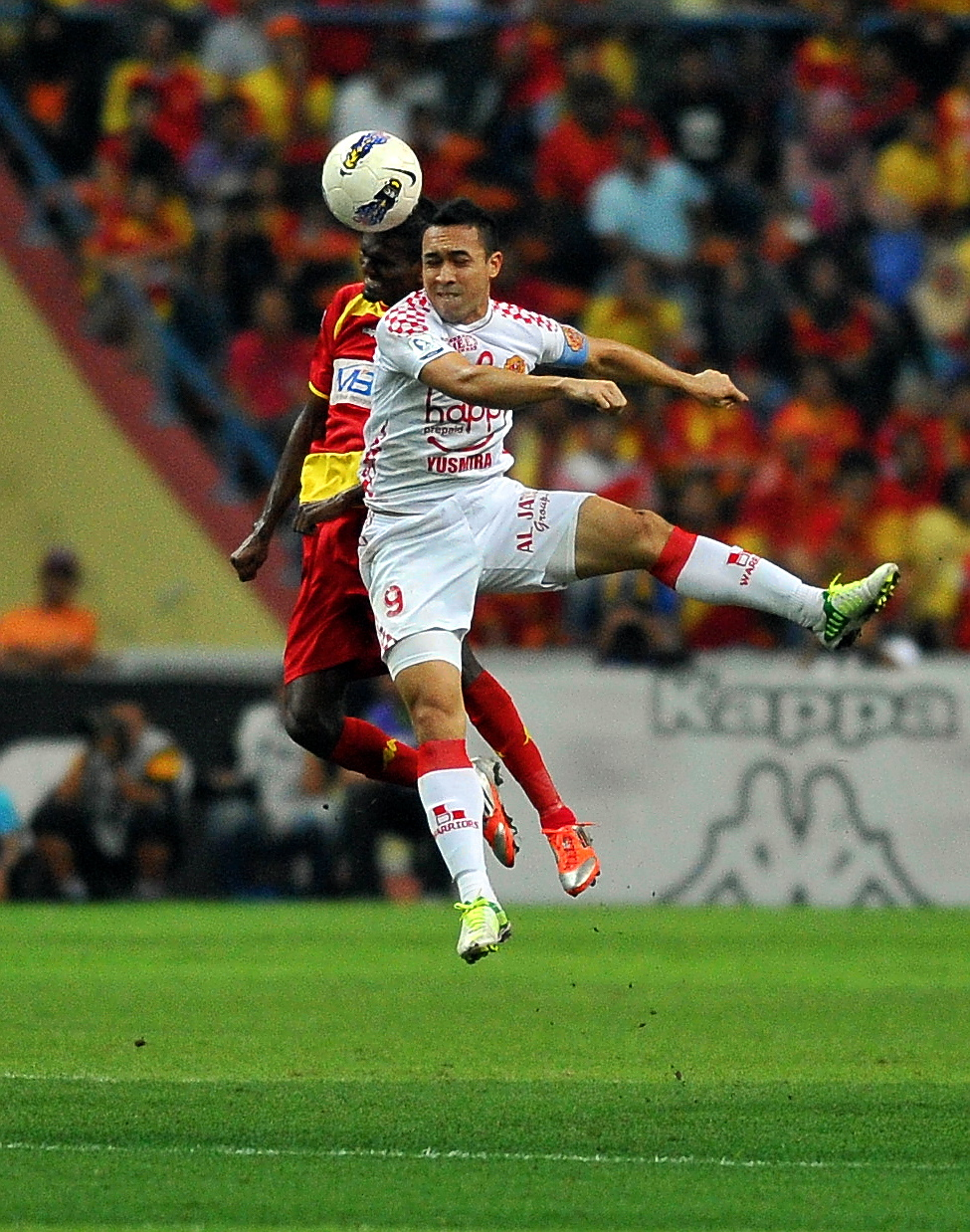
- Haris with Kelantan in the 2012 Malaysia Cup

Personal information
- Full name: Mohd Haris Safwan bin Mohd Kamal
- Date of birth: 8 June 1982 (age 44)
- Place of birth: Terengganu, Malaysia
- Height: 1.73 m (5 ft 8 in)
- Position: Forward

Team information
- Current team: Penang FA U21 (assistant coach)

Senior career*
Years	Team	Apps	(Gls)
2003–2004	MPPJ		
2005	Selangor		
2006	MPPJ		
2007–2008	UPB-MyTeam		
2009–2011	T-Team		
2012	Johor Darul Ta'zim		
2012–2013	Kelantan		
2014	Felda United		
2015	Perak		
2017	Terengganu City		
2018	Hanelang		

International career^{‡}
2003–2005	Malaysia U-23		

Managerial career
- 2018–2019: Banggol Tokku
- 2020–: Penang FA U21
- * Club domestic league appearances and goals as of 7 February 2020 ‡ National team caps and goals as of 27 November 2015

Mohd Haris Safwan bin Mohd Kamal (born 8 June 1982) is a former Malaysian footballer who played as a forward. He was most notably part of the treble-winning Selangor team of 2005 and represented the Malaysian under-23s at the 2003 SEA Games in Vietnam.

Haris holds a bachelor degree with honours in sports science from the University of Malaya, Kuala Lumpur.

== Honours ==
=== Club ===
MPPJ FC

- Malaysia Cup : 2003
- Malaysia Premier League: 2004
- Malaysia Charity Shield: 2004

Selangor

- Malaysia Premier League : 2005
- Malaysia Cup : 2005
- Malaysia FA Cup : 2005

UPB-MyTeam

- Malaysia Premier League : 2006-07 runner up

T-Team FC

- Malaysia Premier League : 2009 runner up

=== International ===
Malaysia U-23

- SEA Games (bronze) Bronze : 2003

Malaysia University

- ASEAN University Games (AUG) (silver) Silver : 2008

=== Individual ===
- Malaysia Premier League Golden Boot : 2009 (24 goals)
