= Rudie Ramli =

Malaysian footballer

Personal information
- Full name: Rudie bin Ramli
- Date of birth: 15 May 1982 (age 44)
- Place of birth: Selangor, Malaysia
- Height: 1.79 m (5 ft 10 1/2 in)
- Position: Forward

Youth career
- 2000: Selangor
- 2000: SV Wehen

Senior career*
Years	Team	Apps	(Gls)
2001	SV Wehen		
2002–2004	Selangor		
2005	PKNS FC	21	(13)
2005–2007	Melaka TMFC		
2007–2008	Kuala Muda Naza		
2009–2011	Selangor		
2012	PKNS FC	12	(1)
2013	Felda United	19	(5)
2014	ATM	8	(1)
2015–2016	Negeri Sembilan	8	(1)
2016–2017	MOF FC		

International career
2005	Malaysia U-23	4	(3)
2005–2007	Malaysia	8	(0)

Managerial career
- 2019: Klang Kingstown FC
- 2020–: Ultimate (assistant coach)
- * Club domestic league appearances and goals

Rudie Ramli (born 15 May 1982) is a Malaysian former professional football player who last played for MOF FC in Malaysia FAM League as a forward.

Born in Selangor, Rudie with Mohd Fadzli Saari of Pahang was the first player from Malaysia who sign a contract to play in Germany. He signed a five-month contract as a semi professional player with SV Wehen who currently in third division of Germany Football.

Rudie is also the former member of Malaysia national team. He played in the 2005 Southeast Asian Games in Manila where Malaysia won the bronze medal. He scored three goals in the competition and earned his first red card at international stage against Cambodia. With the senior team, he made his debut against New Zealand on 19 February 2006. He was also nominated to play for the national team by the then national coach Norizan Bakar in 2006 Pestabola Merdeka.

== Honours ==
=== Club ===
Selangor

- Malaysia Super League: 2009, 2010
- Malaysia Cup: 2002
- Malaysia Charity Shield: 2002

Melaka TM FC

- Malaysia Super League : 2005-06 runner-up

Kuala Muda Naza FC

- Malaysia Premier League: 2007/08

=== International ===
Malaysia U-23

- SEA Games : (silver) silver 2001; (bronze) bronze 2005

=== Individual ===
- FAM Award - Best Striker : 2005-06
