= K. Devan =

Malaysian footballer (born 1961)

Personal information
- Full name: Devan a/l E. Kuppusamy
- Date of birth: 12 April 1961 (age 65)
- Place of birth: Bahau, Negeri Sembilan, Malaysia

Senior career*
Years	Team	Apps	(Gls)
1980–1989	Negeri Sembilan FA	163	(11)

International career
1981	Malaysia	11	(0)

Managerial career
- 1991–1995: Negeri Sembilan Indian
- 1996–1999: NS Chempaka
- 2001–2002: Negeri Sembilan U-23
- 2003–2006: Negeri Sembilan FA
- 2007: Malacca FA
- 2008: Kuala Muda Naza
- 2009–2011: Selangor FA
- 2012: Johor FC
- 2013: Felda United
- 2014: Penang FA
- 2015: Negeri Sembilan FA
- 2016: Kelantan FA
- 2017–2020: Petaling Jaya City
- 2021–2023: Negeri Sembilan
- 2024–2025: Melaka
- * Club domestic league appearances and goals

Devan a/l E. Kuppusamy (born 12 April 1961) simply known as K. Devan, is a Malaysian former footballer and head coach.

== Playing career ==
K. Devan born in Bahau, Negeri Sembilan is a former centre-back player of Negeri Sembilan FA from 1980s. Before that, he also played with PB Negeri Sembilan Indians in Malaysia FAM Cup and reached the final in 1980.

== Managerial career ==
=== Negeri Sembilan FA ===
K. Devan officially started his coaching career in 2004 with his former team Negeri Sembilan FA. He won the 2005-06 Malaysia Super League championship with Negeri Sembilan, as well as guiding the team to the 2006 Malaysia Cup final and 2006 Malaysia FA Cup semi-final.

=== Malacca FA ===
K. Devan then coaches Malacca FA in 2007

=== Kuala Muda Naza ===
In 2008, K. Devan coaches Kuala Muda Naza where he led the team to the Malaysia Premier League championship that year.

=== Selangor FA ===
In 2009, K. Devan was signed as Selangor FA team manager and head coach. He held the roles until his resignation as head coach in September 2011. Under his guidance, Selangor FA became the Malaysia Super League champion in 2009, 2010 and also won 2009 Malaysia FA Cup.

=== Johor FC ===
K. Devan was appointed as head coach of Johor FC for the 2012 Malaysia Super League season, however he resigned in April 2012 after series of poor results in the league.

=== Felda United ===
In early 2013, K. Devan was appointed as head coach of Felda United but was replaced by Azuan Zain in June 2013, with Felda United in poor form and in danger of being relegated with only four games remaining. Devan later was named as the new head coach of Penang FA, a team newly promoted to 2014 Malaysia Premier League, in October 2013.

=== Negeri Sembilan FA ===
In November 2014, Negeri Sembilan announced that K. Devan will take over the 2nd tier Malaysia Premier League club for the 2015 season.

=== Kelantan FA ===
On 5 December 2015, Kelantan FA has unveiled K. Devan as their new head coach. After an unsatisfactory performance shown by the team in the league, he decided to resign on 10 May 2016 citing personal reasons. He was replaced as Kelantan FA head coach by Velizar Popov.

=== Petaling Jaya City ===
In December 2017, MISC-MIFA announced that Devan will take over the position as head coach of the Malaysia Premier League club for the 2018 season. Devan has already overseen the team as interim head coach when he was appointed as technical director in June 2017. On 16 January 2019, the club was rebranded to Petaling Jaya City in which he kept his job as head coach at the club.

=== Third spell at Negeri Sembilan ===
In January 2021, K. Devan was appointed as head coach in his third spell at Negeri Sembilan where he was tasked to guide the team to promotion in which he won the 2021 Malaysia Premier League title with the club and guided them back to the Malaysia Super League.

=== Melaka ===
In 2024, Negeri Sembilan didn't renewed his contract and thus he left the club cementing his place as a legendary figure at Negeri Sembilan. On 6 March 2024, Malaysia M3 League club Melaka took the chance to sign K. Devan as their head coach.

== Managerial statistics ==
As of 25 December 2025

Managerial record by team and tenure
Team	Nat.	From	To	Record					Ref.
Team	Nat.	From	To	G	W	D	L	Win %	Ref.
Selangor	(Malaysia)	1 January 2009	30 September 2011	116	78	21	17	67.24	
Johor	(Malaysia)	1 January 2012	30 April 2012	17	5	4	8	29.41	
Felda United	(Malaysia)	1 January 2013	30 June 2013	30	5	7	18	16.67	
Penang	(Malaysia)	1 October 2013	31 October 2014	29	14	6	9	48.28	
Negeri Sembilan	(Malaysia)	5 November 2014	31 October 2015	25	9	8	8	36.00	
Kelantan	(Malaysia)	5 December 2015	10 May 2016	12	4	4	4	33.33	
Petaling Jaya City	(Malaysia)	30 June 2017	31 December 2020	69	26	15	28	37.68	
Negeri Sembilan	(Malaysia)	1 January 2021	31 December 2023	81	35	21	25	43.21	
Melaka	(Malaysia)	6 March 2024	25 December 2025	45	23	10	12	51.11	
Career Total				424	199	96	129	46.93	

== Honours ==
=== Managerial ===
==== NS Chempaka ====
- Malaysia Premier League (1):2000

==== Negeri Sembilan ====
- Malaysia FA Cup (1): 2003
- Malaysia Super League (1): 2005-06
- Malaysia Premier League (1): 2021

==== Kuala Muda Naza ====
- Malaysia Premier League (1): 2007-08

==== Selangor ====
- Malaysia Super League (2): 2009, 2010
- Malaysia FA Cup (1): 2009
- Malaysian Charity Shield (2): 2009, 2010

==== Melaka ====
- Malaysia A1 Semi-Pro League (1): 2024–25

=== Individual ===
==== National Football Awards ====
- Best Coach Award : 2005-06, 2009
