= Liew Kit Kong =

Malaysian footballer (born 1979)

Liew Kit Kong 廖吉光 லியாவ் ஜிகுவாங்
Personal information
- Full name: Liew Kit Kong
- Date of birth: 6 January 1979 (age 47)
- Place of birth: Perak, Malaysia
- Position: Striker

Youth career
- Perak

Senior career*
Years	Team	Apps	(Gls)
1999–2001	Perak	?	(11)
2002–2003	Kedah	?	(9)
2004	Perak	?	(6)
2005	Sabah	?	(7)
2006	MPPJ	?	(3)
2006–2007	Negeri Sembilan	?	(5)
2007–2009	Kuala Muda Naza	?	(19)
2008	→ Terengganu (loan)	0	(0)
2010	Selangor	?	(3)
2011	Felda United	23	(3)
2015	PKNS	0	(0)

International career^{‡}
2002–2005	Malaysia	13	(5)
- * Club domestic league appearances and goals as of 13 January 2009 ‡ National team caps and goals as of 31 August 2008

Liew Kit Kong (Chinese: 廖吉光; pinyin: Liao Jiguang; born 6 January 1979) is a Malaysian former footballer who last played as a striker for PKNS F.C. He was also a former member of the Malaysian national team.

== Early life ==
Kit Kong was born in Perak and is of mixed Chinese and Indian heritage.

== Career ==
He won the Best Striker award for the 2007-08 FAM Football Awards ahead of two other nominees: Mohd Safee Mohd Sali and Mohd Zaquan Adha Abdul Radzak, despite playing in the second division, the Malaysia Premier League. In that season, he became the top local goal scorer in the Premier League with 16 goals.

Liew has represented the national side since 2002 when he was call up for an international friendly match against five times World Cup winners Brazil. He was selected as one of first eleven to played against Brazilian stars such as Ronaldo and Barca's Ronaldinho. He also played in third place play-off 2004 AFF Championship and part of the squad in 2005 Islamic Solidarity Games when the national team reached quarter-final.

== Career statistics ==
Club	Season	League		Malaysia Cup		FA Cup		AFC Cup		Total	
Club	Season	Apps	Goals	Apps	Goals	Apps	Goals	Apps	Goals	Apps	Goals
Perak FA	1999		2		1		0	–			3
Perak FA	2000		6		0		4	–			10
Perak FA	2001		3		1		2	–			6
Perak FA	Total		11		2		6	–			19
Kedah FA	2002		4		4		2	–			10
Kedah FA	2003		5		0		0	–			5
Kedah FA	Total		9		4		2	–			15
Perak FA	2004		6		0		1		0		7
Perak FA	Total		6		0		1		0		7
Sabah FA	2005		7		4		0	–			11
Sabah FA	Total		7		4		0	–			11
Selangor MPPJ	2005-06		3		2		0	–			5
Selangor MPPJ	Total		3		2		0	–			5
Negeri Sembilan FA	2006-07		5		2		0	6	0		7
Negeri Sembilan FA	Total		5		2		0	6	0		7
Kuala Muda Naza FC	2007-08	25	16	–		6	4	–		31	20
Terengganu FA (loan)	2007-08	–		14	1	–		–		14	1
Kuala Muda Naza FC	2009		2		1		0	–			3
Kuala Muda Naza FC	Total		19		2		4	–			25
Selangor FA	2010		3		0		0	2	0		3
Selangor FA	Total		3		0		0	2	0		3
Felda United FC	2011	23	3	6	0	3	1	-		32	4
Felda United FC	Total	23	3	6	0	3	1	-		32	4
Career total			66		16		14		0		96

== International goals ==
#	Date	Venue	Opponent	Score	Result	Status	Competition
1.	19 August 2004	Bangkok, Thailand	Thailand	1–1	1–2	Won	Friendly
2.	8 December 2004	Kuala Lumpur, Malaysia	Timor-Leste	1–0	5–0	Won	2004 Tiger Cup Group Stage
3.	10 December 2004	Kuala Lumpur, Malaysia	Philippines	1–0	4–1	Won	2004 Tiger Cup Group Stage
4.	28 December 2004	Jakarta, Indonesia	Indonesia	1–1	1–2	Won	2004 Tiger Cup Semi Final
5.	28 December 2004	Jakarta, Indonesia	Indonesia	1–2	1–2	Won	2004 Tiger Cup Semi Final

== Honours ==
Perak

- Malaysia Cup: 2000
- Malaysia FA Cup: 2004

Kedah

- Liga Perdana 2: 2002

Kuala Muda Naza FC

- Malaysia Premier League: 2007/08

Selangor

- Malaysia Super League: 2010
- Malaysia Charity Shield: 2010

=== International ===
- AFF Championship : 2004 third place

=== Individual ===
- Malaysia Premier League Top Local Goalscorer : 2007-08 (16 goals)
- FAM Award - Best Striker : 2007-08
