= 2008 Malaysia FAM League =

Malaysia FAM League
- Season: 2008
- Champions: PBDKT T-Team
- Promoted: PBDKT T-Team; MBJB; SDMS Kepala Batas

2008 FAM League is the 57th edition season of current third-tier league competition in Malaysia. The league is called TM Malaysia FAM League for sponsorship reason.

The league winner for 2008 season is PBDKT T-Team.

== Teams ==
The following teams participated in the Malaysia FAM Cup 2008. In order by the number given by FAM:-

- (Terengganu) PBDKT T-Team
- (Penang) SDMS Kepala Batas
- (Johor) MP Muar FC
- (Johor) MBJB FC
- (Perlis) KSK Tambun Tulang FC
- (Selangor) KSB Juara Ban Hoe Leong FC
- (Johor) Melodi Jaya Sports Club
- Kor RAMD FC

== Season changes ==
The following teams have changed division since the 2007 season.

=== To Malaysia FAM League ===
New Team

- (Johor) Melodi Jaya Sports Club
- (Johor) MP Muar FC
- MB Johor Bahru
- (Selangor) KSB Juara Ban Hoe Leong FC
- (Penang) SDMS Kepala Batas

=== From Malaysia FAM League ===
Promoted to 2007–08 Malaysia Premier League

- (Kuala Lumpur) Felda United
- (Selangor) Proton

Teams withdrawn

- (Sabah) Baverly F.C.
- (Kuala Lumpur) DBKL F.C.
- Malaysia U16
- (Kuala Lumpur) KL Maju United F.C.
- Perlis Bintong F.C.
- (Penang) Waterfalls Rangers F.C.
- (Selangor) SUKSES F.C.
- (Kuala Lumpur) Setia Putra F.C.

=== Team summaries ===
==== Stadia ====
Team	Location	Stadium	Stadium capacity^{1}
PBDKT T-Team	Terengganu	Sultan Ismail Nasiruddin Shah Stadium, Terengganu	15,000
SDMS Kepala Batas	Penang	City Stadium (Penang), Penang	20,000
MP Muar FC	Johor	Sultan Ibrahim Stadium, Muar, Johor	3,000
MBJB FC	Johor	Tun Aminah Mini Stadium, Skudai, Johor Bahru, Johor	500
KSK Tambun Tulang	Perlis	Stadium Utama Perlis	15,000
KSB Juara Ban Hoe Leong FC	Selangor	MPSJ Sports Complex, Subang Jaya, Selangor	5,000
Melodi Jaya SC	Johor	Tun Aminah Mini Stadium, Skudai, Johor Bahru, Johor	500
Kor RAMD FC	Malacca	Hang Tuah Stadium	15,000

== League table ==
Pos	Team	Pld	W	D	L	GF	GA	GD	Pts	Promotion
1	(Terengganu) T-Team	14	11	3	0	36	3	+33	36	Promoted to 2009 Malaysia Premier League
2	(Johor) MBJB FC	14	9	3	2	41	15	+26	30	Promoted to 2009 Malaysia Premier League
3	(Penang) SDMS Kepala Batas	14	9	3	2	28	14	+14	30	Promoted to 2009 Malaysia Premier League
4	(Johor) MP Muar FC	14	6	2	6	29	17	+12	20	
5	(Perlis) KSK Tambun Tulang FC	14	4	1	9	15	22	−7	13	
6	Kor RAMD FC	14	3	4	7	18	31	−13	13	
7	(Selangor) KSB Juara Ban Hoe Leong FC	13	2	4	7	13	28	−15	10	
8	(Johor) Melodi Jaya Sports Club	14	1	1	12	13	45	−32	4	
