= Ong Kim Swee =

Malaysian football player and manager

Personal information
- Full name: Ong Kim Swee
- Date of birth: 11 December 1970 (age 55)
- Place of birth: Malacca, Malaysia
- Position: Midfielder

Senior career*
Years	Team	Apps	(Gls)
1991–1992	Malacca		
1993–1994	Sarawak		
1994–1997	Sabah		
1998	Malacca		

International career
1990–1991	Malaysia Olympic	8	(1)
1994–1995	Malaysia	5	(0)

Managerial career
- 2004–2005: Malacca
- 2009–2014: Harimau Muda A
- 2011–2015: Malaysia U23
- 2014: Malaysia (interim)
- 2015–2017: Malaysia
- 2017–2019: Malaysia U22
- 2017–2019: Malaysia U23
- 2021: Malaysia (technical director)
- 2021–2024: Sabah
- 2024–2025: Persis Solo
- 2025: Persik Kediri
- * Club domestic league appearances and goals

Datuk Ong Kim Swee (Chinese: 王金瑞; pinyin: Wáng Jīn Ruì) DPSM is a Malaysian football manager and former footballer, who was most recently the head coach of Super League club Persik Kediri. He spent most of his career playing for East Malaysian teams, notably Sarawak and Sabah during the mid-1990s.

== Early life ==
Ong was born into a Peranakan family in Malacca, Malaysia on 11 December 1970.

== Playing career ==
Ong began his career as a player for Malacca in the early 1990s. He was a member of the Malaysia Olympic teams nicknamed Barcelona 1992 under Chow Kwai Lam. In 1993, Ong joined Sarawak FA for whom he played two seasons before being controversially transferred to Sabah FA in late 1994. With Sabah, he won the Malaysia FA Cup in 1995 and M-League in 1996. He retired in 1998 because of an injury while playing for Malacca.

Ong made his full international debut against Kuwait on 22 September 1994. He was a member of the Malaysian squad for the 1994 Asian Games and also played for a Malaysian Selection side who famously held Flamengo to a 1–1 draw in an exhibition match in 1995.

== Managerial career ==
Ong coached Malacca FA in 2005. In 2009, Ong took over as head coach of Harimau Muda from K. Rajagopal. He won the 2009 Malaysia Premier League with Harimau Muda that year. He was the manager of the Malaysia U23 which competed in the 2012 Olympic Qualifiers and 2011 Southeast Asian Games.

Ong also coached the club side of Malaysia U-23 squad, Harimau Muda A, who competed in Australia's National Premier Leagues Queensland in 2014.

In 2015, Ong was appointed as head coach of Malaysia national team after the resignation of the previous coach Dollah Salleh. Ong previously had hold the post on an interim basis in 2014 before Dollah was appointed. Despite a series of disappointing results in the 2018 FIFA World Cup qualification, Ong was handed a new two-year contract on 18 January 2016 in charge of the national team.

Ong was re-designated as Malaysia U-22 head coach, replacing Frank Bernhardt, in March 2017 following the appointment of new FAM president Tunku Ismail Idris. With the Malaysia U-22 team, Ong succeeded in reaching the final of the 2017 Southeast Asian Games football tournament on home soil, winning silver as the losing finalist to Thailand as well qualifying the team to the quarter-finals of 2018 AFC U-23 Championship. The Football Association of Malaysia (FAM) announced the resignation of Datuk Ong Kim Swee after its technical director accepted the position as the new head coach of Sabah FA.

In October 2021, Ong was appointed by Malaysia Super League club Sabah. He guide the team in the league to a third-place finished in the 2022 and 2023 season where he also was instrumental in Sabah 2023–24 AFC Cup run until the ASEAN Zonal semi-finals.

On 25 November 2024, Ong moved to Indonesia to signed with Liga 1 club Persis Solo.

== Managerial statistics ==
As of 27 November 2025

Managerial record by team and tenure
Team	Nat.	From	To	Record					Ref.
Team	Nat.	From	To	G	W	D	L	Win %	Ref.
Melaka	(Malaysia)	1 July 2004	30 June 2005	28	5	4	19	17.86	
Harimau Muda A	(Malaysia)	11 May 2009	31 December 2014	24	13	3	8	54.17	
Malaysia U23	(Malaysia)	1 July 2011	5 September 2015	12	5	2	5	41.67	
Malaysia (caretaker)	(Malaysia)	14 September 2014	3 October 2014	3	1	2	0	33.33	
Malaysia	(Malaysia)	6 September 2015	24 March 2017	21	7	6	8	33.33	
Malaysia U23	(Malaysia)	25 March 2017	31 December 2019	12	5	2	5	41.67	
Sabah	(Malaysia)	1 October 2021	21 November 2024	98	53	14	31	54.08	
Persis Solo	(Indonesia)	25 November 2024	19 June 2025	23	7	8	8	30.43	
Persik Kediri	(Indonesia)	19 June 2025	27 November 2025	13	4	3	6	30.77	
Career Total				234	100	44	90	42.74	

== Honours ==
=== Managerial honours ===
Harimau Muda

- Malaysia Premier League: 2009

Malaysia U23 / U22

- SEA Games Gold Medal: 2011
- SEA Games Silver Medal: 2017
- Merdeka Tournament: 2013
- International U-21 Thanh Niên Newspaper Cup: 2012

=== Personal Honours ===
==== Honours of Malaysia ====
- Malacca
  - Companion Class II of the Exalted Order of Malacca (DPSM) - Datuk (2013)
