= 2009 Malaysia FAM League =

Malaysia FAM League
- Season: 2009
- Champions: Pos Malaysia FC
- Promoted: Pos Malaysia FC; USM FC; Majlis Perbandaran Muar FC

2009 FAM League is the 57th edition season of current third-tier league competition in Malaysia. The league is called TM Malaysia FAM League for sponsorship reason.

The league winner for 2009 season is Pos Malaysia FC.

== Teams ==
The following teams participated in the Malaysia FAM Cup 2009. In order by the number given by FAM:-

- 1 Penjara F.C.
- 2 (Perlis) KSK Tambun Tulang FC
- 3 (Kuala Lumpur) Pos Malaysia FC
- 4 (Selangor) KSB Juara Ban Hoe Leong FC
- 5 (Selangor) UiTM F.C.
- 6 (Penang) Universiti Sains Malaysia Staff F.C.
- 7 (Johor) MP Muar FC,
- 8 (Johor) Melodi Jaya Sports Club

== Season changes ==
The following teams have changed division since the 2008 season.

=== To Malaysia FAM League ===
New Team

- Penjara F.C.
- (Kuala Lumpur) Pos Malaysia FC
- (Selangor) UiTM F.C.
- (Penang) Universiti Sains Malaysia Staff F.C.

=== From Malaysia FAM League ===
Promoted to 2009 Malaysia Premier League

- (Terengganu) PBDKT T-Team
- (Johor) MBJB FC
- (Penang) SDMS Kepala Batas

Teams withdrawn

- Kor RAMD FC

=== Team summaries ===
==== Stadia ====
Team	Location	Stadium	Stadium capacity^{1}
Penjara Melaka FC	Malacca	Henry Gurney School Mini Stadium, Melaka	
KSK Tambun Tulang	Perlis	Stadium Utama Negeri, Kangar, Perlis	
Pos Malaysia FC	Selangor	MPS Stadium, Selayang, Selangor	15,000
KSB Juara Ban Hoe Leong FC	Selangor	MPSJ Sports Complex, Subang Jaya, Selangor	5,000
UiTM FC	Selangor	UiTM Stadium, Shah Alam, Selangor	13,000
USM FC	Penang	USM Stadium, Pulau Pinang	5,000
MP Muar FC	Johor	Sultan Ibrahim Mini Stadium, Muar, Johor	3,000
Melodi Jaya SC	Johor	Tun Aminah Mini Stadium, Skudai, Johor Bahru, Johor	500

== League table ==
Pos	Team	Pld	W	D	L	GF	GA	GD	Pts	Qualification or relegation
1	Pos Malaysia	14	9	3	2	29	11	+18	30	Promoted to 2010 Malaysia Premier League
2	KSK Tambun Tulang (Note: Declined promotion to Premier League)	14	7	5	2	21	8	+13	26	
3	Universiti Sains Malaysia Staff	14	7	4	3	28	13	+15	25	Promoted to 2010 Malaysia Premier League
4	Majlis Perbandaran Muar	14	6	4	4	19	13	+6	22	Promoted to 2010 Malaysia Premier League
5	UiTM Pahang	14	6	3	5	25	18	+7	21	
6	Juara Ban Huo Leong Sports Club	14	4	1	9	7	25	−18	13	
7	Penjara	14	2	3	9	18	37	−19	9	Withdrew from 2010 Malaysia FAM League
8	Melodi Jaya Sports Club	14	2	3	9	11	31	−20	9	

Source: Rec.Sport.Soccer Statistics Foundation
Rules for classification: 1) Points; 2) Goal difference; 3) Number of goals scored.
