= 2009 Malaysia Super League =

Liga Super
- Season: 2009
- Dates: 3 January – 3 August 2009
- Champions: Selangor; 1st title
- Relegated: PDRM
- 2010 AFC Cup: Selangor
- Matches: 182
- Goals: 542 (2.98 per match)
- Top goalscorer: Mohd Nizaruddin Yusof (18 goals)

The 2009 Liga Super, also known as the TM Liga Super for sponsorship reasons, was the sixth season of the Liga Super, the top-tier professional football league in Malaysia.

The season was held from 3 January and concluded on 3 August 2009.

The Liga Super champions for 2009 was Selangor.

== Team changes ==
The following teams have changed division.

=== To Malaysia Super League ===
Promoted from Premier League

- Kuala Muda Naza
- PLUS FC
- Kelantan

=== From Malaysia Super League ===
Relegated to Premier League

- Sarawak

Excluded from 2009 Malaysia Super League

- DPMM

== Teams ==
A total of 14 teams compete in the 2009 season which includes the top 12 teams that participated in the 2007–08 season and champions and runners-up of the 2007-08 Liga Premier.

Sarawak were relegated at the end of the 2009 Liga Super season after finishing in the bottom place of the league table.

DPMM was excluded from the competition as per FIFA rules after Football Association of Brunei Darussalam was deregistered by the Registrar of Societies.

2007-08 Liga Premier champions Kuala Muda Naza and runners-up PLUS secured direct promotion to the Liga Super.

- Kedah (2007–08 Liga Super winner)
- Kelantan (Note: Promoted as second runners-up from 2007–08 Liga Premier)
- Negeri Sembilan
- Johor FC
- Selangor
- Perak
- Terengganu
- Perlis
- Pahang
- PDRM
- UPB-MyTeam
- Penang
- Kuala Muda Naza (Note: Promoted as champions from 2007–08 Liga Premier)
- PLUS (Note: Promoted as runners-up from 2007–08 Liga Premier)

== League table ==
Pos	Team	Pld	W	D	L	GF	GA	GD	Pts	Qualification or relegation
1	Selangor (C)	26	20	3	3	64	21	+43	63	Champion / Qualification to AFC Cup
2	Perlis	26	17	5	4	40	19	+21	56	
3	Kedah	26	16	3	7	45	28	+17	51	
4	Johor FC	26	15	3	8	53	27	+26	48	
5	Terengganu	26	15	2	9	46	29	+17	47	
6	Kelantan	26	14	2	10	49	36	+13	44	
7	Negeri Sembilan	26	11	5	10	44	35	+9	38	
8	PLUS	26	11	5	10	35	26	+9	38	
9	Kuala Muda Naza	26	12	1	13	32	41	−9	37	Withdraw from league and dissolved. (Note: Kuala Muda Naza and UPB-MyTeam withdrew before the start of 2010 season.)
10	Perak	26	9	5	12	27	36	−9	32	
11	UPB-MyTeam	26	9	3	14	28	49	−21	30	Withdraw from league and dissolved.
12	Penang	26	5	4	17	29	55	−26	19	
13	Pahang	26	5	2	19	31	62	−31	17	
14	PDRM (R)	26	0	3	23	19	75	−56	3	Relegated to Liga Premier

Source: Results TM Liga Super and Rec.Sport.Soccer Statistics Foundation
(C) Champions; (R) Relegated

== Results ==
Home \ Away	JFC	KED	KEL	KM	NSE	PLUS	PDRM	PAH	PEN	PRK	PRL	SEL	TER	UPB
Johor FC		5–1	2–1	0–1	3–0	1–1	4–0	4–0	2–2	0–1	1–2	2–1	3–0	1–0
Kedah	0–0		1–2	2–1	3–1	2–0	7–2	3–1	1–0	3–1	0–0	1–4 (Note: The opening league game of the season between Kedah and Selangor also doubled up as the Piala Sumbangsih. Selangor won 4–1.)	3–0	1–0
Kelantan	1–2	0–1		2–1	1–2	1–0 (Note: The game between Kelantan and PLUS was awarded 3–0 to PLUS as Kelantan could not agree on a suitable venue. However the result was then revoked and the game would be replayed at a later date.)	4–0	3–2	4–1	4–0	1–2	1–1	3–2	3–0
Kuala Muda Naza	2–1	0–4	0–1		1–0	2–0	1–0	4–1	3–1	3–1	0–1	1–2	1–0	1–2
Negeri Sembilan	3–0	3–0	2–0	3–1		0–0	4–1	3–0	5–1	3–0	0–4	1–1	1–1	6–2
PLUS	0–1	0–0	2–0	5–0	5–2		3–1	2–0	3–1	1–1	2–1	1–3	2–1	0–1
PDRM	1–2	0–2	2–4	0–2	1–1	1–1		1–4	0–2	2–3	1–3	1–6	1–4	0–3
Pahang	2–3	2–4	1–5	1–2	1–0	0–1	3–1		1–1	2–1	1–3	1–2	1–2	1–2
Penang	0–5	1–2	1–1	3–0	0–3	1–3	3–1	2–2		1–2	1–0	0–1	2–3	2–3
Perak	0–3	1–0	2–3	2–0	2–0	2–0	1–0	2–0	0–1		1–1	0–1	0–1	1–1
Perlis	1–0	1–0	2–0	0–0	1–0	2–1	2–1	3–2	3–0	0–0		0–0	0–2	2–0
Selangor	4–1	3–1	3–0	4–1	3–0	1–0	5–1	5–1	1–0	3–1	2–1		3–1	0–1
Terengganu	3–2	0–2	2–0	2–0	2–0	0–2	1–0	3–0	4–1	1–1	2–3	2–1		2–0
UPB-MyTeam	0–5	0–1	2–4	3–4	1–1	1–0	0–0	0–1	2–1	2–1	1–2	1–4	0–5	

Updated to match(es) played on 1 August 2009. Source: Results TM Liga Super
Legend: Blue = home team win; Yellow = draw; Red = away team win.

== Season statistics ==
=== Top scorers ===
Rank	Player	Club	Goals
1	Mohd Nizaruddin Yusof	Perlis	18
2	Mohd Ashaari Shamsuddin	Terengganu	17
3	Indra Putra Mahayuddin	Kelantan	14
4	Mohd Amri Yahyah	Selangor	13
4	Razali Umar Kandasamy	Perak	13
5	Mohd Safee Mohd Sali	Selangor	12
5	Mohd Khyril Muhymeen Zambri	Kedah	12
5	Mohd Azlan Ismail	Terengganu	12
6	Mohd Zaquan Adha Abdul Radzak	Negeri Sembilan	11
7	Norshahrul Idlan Talaha	UPB-MyTeam	10
7	Abdul Manaf Mamat	Terengganu	10
8	Mohd Fadzli Saari	KL PLUS	9
8	Muhamad Khalid Jamlus	Kelantan	9

8 goals
Player	Club	Goals
Khairul Izuan Abdullah	PDRM	8
Azamuddin Mohd Akil	Pahang	8
Mohd Nurul Azwan Roya	Johor FC	8
Shahurain Abu Samah	Negeri Sembilan	8
Akmal Rizal Ahmad Rakhli	Kuala Muda Naza	8
Badrol Bakhtiar	Kedah	8
Eddy Helmi Abdul Manan	Johor FC	8

7 goals
Player	Club	Goals
Mohd Azrul Ahmad	Kedah	7
Mohd Nor Farhan Muhammad	Kelantan	7

6 goals
Player	Club	Goals
Mohd Syaiful Sabtu	Johor FC	6
R. Surendran	Selangor	6
Mohd Badrul Hisani Abdul Rahman	Pahang	6
Mohd Amirul Hadi Zainal	Selangor	6
Rudie Ramli	Selangor	6
Azizan Baba	Johor FC	6
Mohd Badri Mohd Radzi	Kelantan	6
Ahmad Fakri Saarani	Perlis	6
Zulhissyam Jamaluddin	Kuala Muda Naza	6
Stanley Bernard	UPB-MyTeam	6
Mohd Faizal Abu Bakar	Kedah	6

5 goals
Player	Club	Goals
Mohd Saufi Sa’aidi	Perak	5
Irwan Fadzli Idrus	KL PLUS	5
S. Kunalan	Negeri Sembilan	5
Mohd Rafiuddin Nordin	Pulau Pinang	5
Mohd Irme Mat	Pulau Pinang	5
Mohd Ezaidy Mohd Khadar	Johor FC	5
R. Kartigesu	Pahang	5
K. Rajan	Kuala Muda Naza	5
Muhammad Shukor Adan	Negeri Sembilan	5

4 goals
Player	Club	Goals
Bobby Gonzales	KL PLUS	4
Mohd Farid Idris	Johor FC	4
Rusydee Samsuddin	KL PLUS	4
Azi Shahril Azmi	Perlis	4
Farderin Kadir	Kuala Muda Naza	4
Fazrul Hazli	UPB-MyTeam	4
Mohd Shahrizan Salleh	Pahang	4
Anuar Jusoh	Kuala Muda Naza	4
Idris Abdul Karim	Negeri Sembilan	4
M. Prakash	Pulau Pinang	4

3 goals
Player	Club	Goals
D. Surendran	Selangor	3
Mohd Nasriq Baharom	Selangor	3
Mohd Hamzani Omar	Johor FC	3
Mohd Failee Ghazali	Pulau Pinang	3
V. Jeganathan	Pulau Pinang	3
R. Surendran	Pahang	3
Eddy Gapil	PDRM	3
Zairul Fitree Ishak	Kelantan	3
C. Premnath	Selangor	3
S. Thinagaran	Pulau Pinang	3
Mohd Aidil Zafuan Abdul Radzak	Negeri Sembilan	3
Shahrulnizam Mustapa	Kedah	3
Zairo Anuar Zalani	Terengganu	3
Silvester Sindih	PDRM	3
Muhamad Zamri Chin	UPB-MyTeam	3
Ramzul Zahini	Kelantan	3

2 goal
Player	Club	Goals
Mohd Nazrin Nawi	UPB-MyTeam	2
Mohd Safiq Rahim	KL PLUS	2
Liew Kit Kong	Kuala Muda Naza	2
Norhafiz Zamani Misbah	KL PLUS	2
Mohd Lot Abu Hassan	KL PLUS	2
Shazwan Zainol	Perlis	2
Zuraindey Jumai	Perlis	2
Firdaus Faudzi	Perlis	2
Md Syafuan Riduwan	Johor FC	2
Wan Rohaimi Wan Ismail	Johor FC	2
Mohd Riduwan Maon	Johor FC	2
Mohd Noor Hazrul Mustafa	Perak	2
Shahrizal Saad	Perak	2
Mat Sabree Mat Abu	Kedah	2
Ahmad Fauzi Saari	Kedah	2
Mohd Fadly Baharum	Kedah	2
R Gopinanthan	Pahang	2
Hasmizan Kamarodin	Pahang	2
Fauzi Abdul Majid	PDRM	2
Khairul Zal Azmi	PDRM	2
Mohd Firdaus Azizul	Negeri Sembilan	2

1 goal
Player	Club	Goal
Razman Roslan	Selangor	1
Mohd Asraruddin Putra Omar	Selangor	1
Khairul Anuar Baharom	Selangor	1
Mohammad Hardi Jaafar	Selangor	1
Fitri Shazwan Raduwan	Selangor	1
Muhd Zameer Zainun	Selangor	1
Mohd Fazilidin Khalid	Selangor	1
Mohd Azrul Hafiq Mohd Amran	Selangor	1
Azmi Muslim	UPB-MyTeam	1
Muhamad Kaironnisam Sahabudin Hussain	UPB-MyTeam	1
Depan Sakwati Kandasamy	UPB-MyTeam	1
Bunyamin Umar	UPB-MyTeam	1
K. Soley	Perlis	1
Ridzuan Othman	Perlis	1
Chan Wing Hoong	Perlis	1
Danial Fadzly Abdullah	Perlis	1
Amar Rohidan	Perlis	1
Razlan Oto	Pahang	1
Sumardi Hajalan	Johor FC	1
M. Sivakumar	Johor FC	1
K. Thanaraj	Negeri Sembilan	1
Rahman Zabul	Negeri Sembilan	1
Rezal Zambery Yahya	Negeri Sembilan	1
Mohd Asyraf Al Jappri	Negeri Sembilan	1
Khairul Izzat	Perak	1
Syazwan Roslan	Perak	1
Isma Alif Mohd Salim	Perak	1
Hafiz Abdul Rahman	Perak	1
Wan Hossen Wan Abdul Ghani	Perak	1
Ailim Fahmi	Kelantan	1
Ahmad Azlan Zainal	Kelantan	1
Halimi Fahmi	Kelantan	1
Mohd Nizad Ayub	Kelantan	1
Mohd Rizal Fahmi	Kelantan	1
Abdul Aziz Ismail	KL PLUS	1
Norfahmi Hazrin	KL PLUS	1
S. Sumindran	KL PLUS	1
Mohd Hairul Nizam Hanif	KL PLUS	1
Rusydee Samsuddin	KL PLUS	1
Amir Shahreen Mubin	KL PLUS	1
Nur Adli Effendi	KL PLUS	1
Mohd Idzwan Salim	Pulau Pinang	1
M. Venod	Pulau Pinang	1
Mohd Nor Azlan	Pulau Pinang	1
Manzoor Azwira Wahid	Kuala Muda Naza	1
Shazlan Alias	Terengganu	1
Ahmad Nordin Alias	Terengganu	1
Mohd Saufie Hamid	Terengganu	1
Ismail Faruqi	Terengganu	1
Mohd Hafiz Kamal	Pahang	1
Mohd Azrul Azman	PDRM	1
Wan Zaim Wan Azizan	Kedah	1
Mohd Afif Amiruddin	Kedah	1
Mohd Farizal Rozali	Kedah	1

Own goal
Player	Club	Own goal
B. Rajnikandh	Kuala Muda Naza	l. Selangor
M. Sivakumar	Johor FC	l. Selangor
Syafuan Ridwan	Johor FC	l. Selangor
Azmi Muslim	UPB-MyTeam	l. Kuala Muda Naza
Talfizam Taufik	PDRM	l. Selangor
Rizal Nayan	PDRM	l. Kelantan
Che Ku Ahmad Rusydi	Terengganu	l. Kelantan
Victor Andrag	Kedah	l. Kuala Muda Naza

== See also ==
- List of Liga Super seasons
