= Mohd Azraai Khor Abdullah =

Malaysian footballer and coach (1952–2024)

Personal information
- Full name: Mohd Azraai Khor Bin Abdullah
- Date of birth: 25 October 1952
- Place of birth: Kedah, Federation of Malaya
- Date of death: 8 February 2024 (aged 71)
- Place of death: Alor Star, Kedah, Malaysia
- Position: Midfielder

Senior career*
Years	Team	Apps	(Gls)
1969–1980	Kedah		
1981–1986	Kilat Kedah		

International career
1975–1978	Malaysia		

Managerial career
- 1991: Kedah
- 1992–1993: Kedah FA (assistant coach)
- 1994: Kedah
- 1998: Kedah
- 2002: Kedah
- 2002: TNB Kelantan FC
- 2004–2009: Kedah FA
- 2010: Harimau Muda A
- 2011–2012: Negeri Sembilan FA
- 2012–2013: Perak FA
- 2014: T–Team
- 2015: Kelantan FA
- 2015: Sabah FA
- 2018: Negeri Sembilan FA
- * Club domestic league appearances and goals

Mohd Azraai Khor Bin Abdullah, born Khor Sek Leng, (Chinese: 许锡龙; pinyin: Xu Xi Long; 25 October 1952 – 8 February 2024) was a Malaysian football coach and player.

Azraai was very successful as a football coach and even became legendary in Malaysia when, in 2007 and 2008, he coached his team, Kedah FA (at the time known as The Canaries) to a "double treble" — victories in all three major football competitions in two consecutive years. This was a unique accomplishment in Malaysian football.

== Playing career ==
Azraai was a Kedah FA player for the Malaysia Cup competition and also was in Kedah Kilat FC (a team of Tenaga Nasional Berhad, known as Lembaga Letrik Negara Tanah Melayu before 1990) for the FAM Cup competition from 1969 until 1980. He played as midfielder, right winger and also skippered the team. Azraai was also part of the Malaysia national team from 1975 to 1978. In 1976, he was part of the Malaysia squad in the AFC Asian Cup in Iran. He also was part of the Malaysia squad that won the Merdeka Cup and King's Cup in 1976.

== Coaching career ==
=== Early career ===
In 1991, at the age of 39 Azraai was appointed head coach of the Kedah Malaysia President Cup team. He worked as part of the club's youth team for several years — 1991, 1994, 1998 and 2002. However, his glorious career began in 1993 when he and his colleague, Azman Haji Eusoff, then just an up-and-coming tactician, assisted Robert Alberts in making history with a bunch of great players including his assistants now Muhamad Radhi Mat Din and Ahmad Sabri Ismail, from winning the second-division title without losing in 1992 to a clean sweep of the domestic football titles in 1993 – Division 1 (the now renamed Malaysia Super League) and Malaysia Cup.

=== Kelantan TNB FC head coach ===
Before return to Kedah, Azraai had previously managed Kelantan TNB FC in 2002 when he was an employee of Tenaga Nasional Berhad (TNB), an electricity company in Malaysia.

=== Kedah head coach ===
After the late Ahmad Basri Akil appointed him in August 2004, Azraai helped revive Kedah's fortunes after the club had fallen to the bottom of the 2004 Malaysia Super League table. At the time, the team was managed by Mirandinha. Following Mirandinha's departure, Azraai, who had returned to Kulim from Kelantan while working full-time for TNB, took charge of the team. Under his leadership, Kedah's performances improved, and the club reached the 2004 Malaysia Cup final, where they were defeated 1–0 by Perlis.

=== Successive 'double treble' ===
Azraai became the only coach to win double treble championships in successive years, which he did in the 2006–07 and 2007–08 seasons. After he clinched the third cup in the Malaysian football arena, coach Azraai also regarded the 2006–07 Malaysian Favourite Coach Award in 100Plus-F.A.M National Football Awards as an additional motivation after his team won three titles – the Malaysia FA Cup, the Malaysia Super League, and the Malaysia Cup in the 2006–07 season and also as a boost for the future of football in Kedah and in the country.

Also, a few hours before he created another historical moment of Malaysian football on 23 August 2008, he once again was awarded the 2007–08 Malaysian Best Coach Award at the same awards after Kedah retained the 2007–08 Malaysian Super League and Malaysian FA Cup trophies for a second consecutive time. Azraai deserved the awards after his Kedah wonder boys won the Malaysia Cup final defeated Selangor FA with a 3–2 result.

=== After Kedah ===
Azraai Khor resigned from Kedah after the 2009 season, when Kedah failed to scale the heights of the previous two seasons, mainly because of the loss of his influential import players due to a new ruling by FAM. His problems with the new management team also led to his departure.

Azraai Khor was appointed the head coach of Harimau Muda A in 2010, but resigned later in the year after confrontation with the team's technical personnel and players during the squad training stint in Slovakia.

In 2011, he was named as the new head coach of Negeri Sembilan FA, replacing Wan Jamak Wan Hassan (who took over as head coach of Azraai's former team Kedah later that season). Although Negeri Sembilan's results were dire when he took over, he improved the team's fortunes. The pinnacle of the season was when he led Negeri Sembilan to the 2011 Malaysia Cup triumph, beating Terengganu FA 2–1 in the final.

On 15 October 2012, he was announced as Perak FA's new coach. Signing a two-year contract, Azraai resigned from his job in October 2013 after only one season, in which he guided Perak to seventh place in the league, but failed to lead Perak out of the group stage of 2013 Malaysia Cup, which included a 6–1 thrashing by Sarawak FA.

On 14 November 2013, he was officially unveiled as the new T-Team F.C. head coach. Azraai resigned from his job at the end of July 2014, after T-Team were relegated to the Malaysia Premier League.

On 24 March 2015, Azraai was appointed the new head coach for Kelantan FA replacing George Boateng who was appointed Technical Director. However three months later, Azraai resigned from his position, with only one win in seven league matches and losing in the 2015 Malaysia FA Cup final to LionsXII.

Azraai Khor was announced as the new head coach of Sabah FA in September 2015, his one-year contract beginning on 1 October. But less than a month later, he mutually terminated his contract with Sabah.

On 28 February 2018, he returned to Negeri Sembilan as head coach to replace Jörg Steinebrunner who resigned after just five games into the 2018 Malaysia Super League. However, Azraai was sacked just three months later on 10 May 2018, after the team performed no better than with the previous coach, languishing in the relegation zone.

== Death ==
Azraai Khor died on 8 February 2024, at the age of 71.

== Honours ==
=== Coach ===
Kedah

- Malaysia Super League: 2006–07, 2007–08
- Malaysia Premier League: 2005–06; runner-up 2005
- Malaysia FA Cup: 2006–07, 2007–08
- Malaysia Cup: 2006–07, 2007–08; runner-up 2004

Negeri Sembilan

- Malaysia Cup: 2011
- Malaysia Charity Shield: 2012

Kelantan FA

- Malaysia FA Cup runner-up: 2015

Individual

- 100Plus-F.A.M National Football Awards "Malaysian Favourite Coach": 2006–07
- 100Plus-F.A.M National Football Awards "Malaysian Best Coach": 2007–08

== Quotes ==
- "To be a champion we must act like a champion." - Fokus Bola, 12 July 2007
