= André Scotti =

Brazilian footballer (born 1982)

Personal information
- Full name: André Scotti Ossemer
- Date of birth: January 31, 1982 (age 44)
- Place of birth: Brazil
- Height: 1.77 m (5 ft 9 1/2 in)
- Position: Center forward

Senior career*
Years	Team	Apps	(Gls)
1997–2003	Criciúma Esporte Clube	1	(0)
2004	Rio Preto Esporte Clube		
2005–2006	Esporte Clube Próspera		
2007	FC Zwolle	11	(2)
2008	Sabah FA	24	(12)
- * Club domestic league appearances and goals

André Scotti Ossemer (born January 31, 1982) is a Brazilian footballer. He previously played at the Eerste Divisie for FC Zwolle. In January 2008, he transferred to Sabah FA and played in the Malaysia Premier League. His contract was terminated at the end of the season when Football Association of Malaysia did not want foreign players for the 2009 season.
