= Harimau Muda A =

- Full name: Harimau Muda A
- Nickname: The Young Tigers
- Founded: 2009; 17 years ago
- Dissolved: 2015; 11 years ago
- Ground: Stadium Petaling Jaya
- Capacity: 25,000
- Chairman: Afandi Hamzah
- Head coach: Ong Kim Swee
- 2014: 9
Home colours	Away colours	Third colours

Harimau Muda A was the Malaysia under-22 national football team, representing Malaysia in international football competitions such as the AFC U-22 Asian Cup, Champions Youth Cup as well as other under-22 international football tournaments. It was managed by the Football Association of Malaysia. The squad was the feeder team for Malaysia U-23. On 25 November 2015, it was confirmed that Harimau Muda A, Harimau Muda B, and Harimau Muda C were disbanded. Harimau Muda A last competed in the National Premier Leagues Queensland, having earlier participated in the S.League.

== History ==
On 19 October 2007, the FAM decided to include Malaysia U-21 as one of the team in 2007–08 Premier League Malaysia known as Harimau Muda (The Young Tigers). During the 2010 season, Harimau Muda A went to a training camp in Zlaté Moravce, Slovakia. After the stint in Slovakia, Harimau Muda A joined the 2011 Super League Malaysia replacing KL PLUS FC, finishing at 5th place.

For the 2012 season, Harimau Muda A swapped places with the Young Lions of Singapore, joining the S. League. Harimau Muda B will continue to participate in the Malaysia Premier League. For the 2012 S. League season, Harimau Muda A continued to use their training centre at Wisma FAM. However, for the league matches they were based at the Yishun Stadium.

== Competition records ==
Year	League position	League competitions	Cup competitions
2007–08	8/13	Malaysia Premier League	Malaysia FA Cup – Round 1
2009	1/13 Champions	Malaysia Premier League	Malaysia FA Cup – Quarter Final
2010			–
2011	5/14	Malaysia Super League	Malaysia FA Cup – Round 2
2012	4/13	S.League	Singapore League Cup – Did not enter
2013	Slovakia Centralised Training Camp	N/A	–
2014	9/13	National Premier Leagues Queensland	–

== Honours ==
=== Domestic ===
- Malaysia Premier League
  - Winners (1): 2009

=== International ===
- AFC Youth Championship
  - Runner-up (3): 1959, 1960, 1968
  - Third place (1): 1965
  - Fourth place (1): 1962
- AFF Youth Championship
  - Runner-up (3): 2005, 2006, 2007
  - Third place (1): 2011
  - Fourth place (1): 2009

=== Others ===
- International U-21 Football Tournament Thanh Nien Cup
  - Winners (1): 2012

== International records ==
=== FIFA World Youth Championship ===
FIFA U-20 World Cup Record
Year	Round	Position	GP	W	D	L	GS	GA
(Tunisia) 1977 to (Qatar) 1995	Did not qualify							
(Malaysia) 1997	Round 1	24/24	3	0	0	3	2	9
(Nigeria) 1999 to (Egypt) 2009	Did not qualify							
(Colombia) 2011	Did not qualify							
(Turkey) 2013	Did not qualify							
(New Zealand) 2015	Did not qualify							
Total	1/17	-	3	0	0	3	2	9

**Red border colour indicates tournament was held on home soil.

FIFA World Youth Championship History
Year	Round	Score	Result
1997	Round 1	Malaysia 1 – 3 Morocco	Loss
1997	Round 1	Malaysia 1 – 3 Uruguay	Loss
1997	Round 1	Malaysia 0 – 3 Belgium	Loss

=== AFC Youth Championship ===
AFC Youth Championship Record
Year	Round	Position	GP	W	D	L	GS	GA
(Federation of Malaya) 1959	Runners-up	2/4	3	2	0	1	14	2
(Federation of Malaya) 1960	Runners-up	-	-	-	-	-	-	-
(Thailand) 1961	Round 1	5/10	4	2	1	1	15	7
(Thailand) 1962	Fourth Place	4/10	5	2	2	1	11	6
(Federation of Malaya) 1963	Round 1	5/12	5	3	0	2	10	6
(Vietnam) 1964	Unknown							
(Japan) 1965	Third Place	3/10	5	3	0	2	6	7
(Philippines) 1966	Quarter Final	5/12	4	2	1	1	8	3
(Thailand) 1967	Round 1	14/14	2	0	0	2	1	10
(South Korea) 1968	Runners-up	2/12	7	4	0	3	9	15
(Thailand) 1969	Quarter Final	5/15	4	1	1	2	4	8
(Philippines) 1970	Unknown							
(Japan) 1971	Quarter Final	5/16	4	2	0	2	3	6
(Thailand) 1972 to (Thailand) 1974	Unknown							
(Kuwait) 1975	Round 1	15/19	4	0	2	2	3	7
(Thailand) 1976	Round 1	14/15	3	0	0	3	0	9
(Iran) 1977	Round 1	8/13	3	0	2	1	1	4
(Bangladesh) 1978	Round 1	14/18	3	1	0	2	3	9
(Thailand) 1980 to (Qatar) 2002	Did not qualify							
(Malaysia) 2004	Quarter Final	8/16	4	2	0	2	4	6
(India) 2006	Round 1	15/16	3	0	0	3	1	7
(Saudi Arabia) 2008	Did not qualify							
(China) 2010	Did not qualify							
(United Arab Emirates) 2012	Did not qualify							
(Myanmar) 2014	Did not qualify							
Total	-	3 Runners-up	-	-	-	-	-	-

**Red border colour indicates tournament was held on home soil.

=== AFF Youth Championship record ===
AFF U-20 Youth Championship Record
Year	Round	Position	GP	W	D	L	GS	GA
(Indonesia) 2005	Runners-up	2/10	5	3	1	2	21	8
(Malaysia) 2006	Runners-up	2/4	3	1	1	1	4	4
(Vietnam) 2007	Runners-up	2/8	5	3	0	2	13	7
Total	3/3	3 Runners-up	13	7	2	5	38	19

**Red border colour indicates tournament was held on home soil.

=== Hassanal Bolkiah Trophy ===
(Brunei) Hassanal Bolkiah Trophy (Brunei)
Year	Round	GP	W	D	L	GS	GA
2002	Third Place	5	2	0	3	13	9
2005	Group Stage	4	2	0	2	3	7
2007	Third Place	4	1	1	2	4	7
Total	Best: Third Place	13	5	1	7	20	23

- Malaysia sent Harimau Muda B beginning from 2012 edition.

== Coaches ==
Year	Head coach
1992–1994	(Malaysia) M. Karathu
1994–1995	(Malaysia) N. Raju
1995–1998	(Tunisia) Hatem Souissi
1999–2000	(England) Allan Harris
2000–2004	(Brazil) Jorvan Vieira
2004–2009	(Malaysia) K. Rajagopal
2009–2010	(Malaysia) Mohd Azraai Khor Abdullah
2009–2014	(Malaysia) Ong Kim Swee

== See also ==
- Malaysia national football team
- Malaysia national under-23 football team
- Malaysia Pahang Sports School
- Malaysia XI
- FAM-MSN Project
- Singa Muda Perlis F.C.
- National Football Development Programme of Malaysia
- Mokhtar Dahari Academy
