= 2009 Malaysia Premier League =

Liga Premier
- Season: 2009
- Champions: Harimau Muda; 1st title
- Promoted: T–Team; Johor; Kuala Lumpur
- Relegated: SDMS Kepala Batas
- Matches: 182

The 2009 Liga Premier (English: 2009 Premier League), also known as the TM Liga Premier for sponsorship reasons, was the sixth season of the Liga Premier, the second-tier professional football league in Malaysia.

The season was held from 9 January and concluded on 2 August 2009.

The Liga Premier champions for 2009 season was Harimau Muda. As a development team, Harimau Muda had to stay in Liga Premier while T-Team and Johor promoted to Liga Super as a second and third placed team in the league respectively. Kuala Lumpur was later promoted to Liga Super too to keep the team number balanced after Kuala Muda Naza and UPB-MyTeam withdrawal from Super League for 2010 season.

== Team changes ==
=== To Premier League ===
Relegated from Super League

- Sarawak

Promoted from 2008 FAM League

- PBDKT T-Team
- MBJB FC
- SDMS Kepala Batas

Development team from FAM

- Harimau Muda

=== From Premier League ===
Promoted to Super League

- Kuala Muda Naza
- PLUS FC
- Kelantan

Relegated to FAM League

- No team.

== League table ==
Pos	Team	Pld	W	D	L	GF	GA	GD	Pts	Qualification or relegation
1	Harimau Muda (Note: Harimau Muda is a national developmental football team restricted to playing in the Premier League, therefore they were not promoted.)	24	20	2	2	49	16	+33	62	
2	T-Team	24	17	6	1	58	11	+47	57	Promoted to Malaysia Super League
3	Johor	24	16	3	5	48	15	+33	51	Promoted to Malaysia Super League
4	Kuala Lumpur (Note: Kuala Lumpur was later promoted to Super League to keep the team number balanced after Kuala Muda Naza and UPB-MyTeam withdrawal from Super League for 2010 season.)	24	14	5	5	46	18	+28	47	Promoted to Malaysia Super League
5	Proton	24	12	4	8	40	25	+15	40	Withrew from Premier League and dissolved.
6	Felda United	24	10	7	7	29	23	+6	37	
7	PKNS	24	8	7	9	20	24	−4	31	
8	Shahzan Muda	23	6	6	11	27	35	−8	24	
9	Sabah	24	5	7	12	18	31	−13	22	
10	ATM	24	5	6	13	19	52	−33	21	
11	Malacca	24	3	9	12	17	32	−15	18	
12	Sarawak	24	3	6	15	29	57	−28	15	
13	SDMS Kepala Batas	24	1	4	19	9	71	−62	7	Relegated to Malaysia FAM League
14	MBJB (Note: All games involving MBJB were declared null and void after the FAM competitions committee on Tuesday 24 March turned down MBJB’s appeal against the decision to expel them from the league for failure to settle insurance premium payments for their players and officials.)	0	0	0	0	0	0	0	0	Disqualified

Source: Rec.Sport.Soccer Statistics Foundation
Rules for classification: 1) Points; 2) Goal difference; 3) Number of goals scored.
