= 2007–08 Malaysia Premier League =

Liga Premier
- Season: 2007–08
- Champions: Kuala Muda Naza; 1st Second Division title
- Promoted: Kuala Muda Naza; PLUS; Kelantan

The 2007–08 Liga Premier (English: 2007–08 Premier League), also known as the TM Liga Premier for sponsorship reasons, was the fifth season of the Liga Premier, the second-tier professional football league in Malaysia.

The season was held from 17 December 2007 and concluded in 3 May 2008. A total of 13 clubs compete in a single group format. Harimau Muda, a feeder team project for the Malaysia national football team, joined the league in preparation for the national competition.

The Liga Premier champions for 2007–08 was Kuala Muda Naza. The club were promoted to 2009 Liga Super along with runners-up PLUS and third-place Kelantan.

== Team changes ==
=== To Premier League ===
Relegated from Super League

- Malacca

Promoted from 2008 FAM League

- Felda United
- Proton

=== From Premier League ===
Promoted to Super League

- PDRM
- UPB-MyTeam

Relegated to FAM League

- No team.

== League table ==
| Pos | Team | Pld | W | D | L | GF | GA | GD | Pts | Promotion |
|---|---|---|---|---|---|---|---|---|---|---|
| 1 | Kuala Muda Naza | 24 | 20 | 1 | 3 | 52 | 27 | +25 | 61 | Promoted to Liga Super |
| 2 | PLUS | 24 | 18 | 3 | 3 | 56 | 21 | +35 | 57 | Promoted to Liga Super |
| 3 | Kelantan | 24 | 16 | 5 | 3 | 59 | 30 | +29 | 53 | Promoted to Liga Super |
| 4 | Sabah | 24 | 13 | 5 | 6 | 48 | 27 | +21 | 44 | |
| 5 | Johor | 24 | 13 | 4 | 7 | 41 | 26 | +15 | 43 | |
| 6 | Felda United | 24 | 7 | 6 | 11 | 28 | 35 | −7 | 27 | |
| 7 | Proton | 24 | 8 | 3 | 13 | 27 | 45 | −18 | 27 | |
| 8 | Harimau Muda | 24 | 7 | 5 | 12 | 30 | 38 | −8 | 26 | |
| 9 | Malacca | 24 | 8 | 2 | 14 | 29 | 43 | −14 | 26 | |
| 10 | Shahzan Muda | 24 | 7 | 4 | 13 | 28 | 46 | −18 | 25 | |
| 11 | PKNS | 24 | 5 | 7 | 12 | 27 | 38 | −11 | 22 | |
| 12 | Kuala Lumpur | 24 | 3 | 7 | 14 | 24 | 41 | −17 | 16 | |
| 13 | ATM | 24 | 4 | 2 | 18 | 29 | 61 | −32 | 14 | |

- Note: Originally only 2 clubs will be promoted to Liga Super, however FAM decided to promote third-place clubs in order to balance the number of team to compete in Liga Super and Liga Premier which is 14 clubs for the next season. This decision also affected the relegation as ATM will not be relegated for 2009 season and will be joined by two promoted clubs from Liga FAM, the MBJB and T-Team along with Sarawak which has been relegated from 2007–08 Liga Super.

== Goalscorers ==
| Position | Players | Teams/Clubs | Goals |
|---|---|---|---|
| 1 | Mouhamadou Moustapha | Kelantan | 27 |
| 2 | Otelo Ocampos Espinola | Johor | 23 |
| 3 | Alex Agbo | PLUS | 19 |
| 4 | Liew Kit Kong | Kuala Muda Naza | 16 |
| 5 | André Scotti Ossemer | Sabah | 12 |
| 6 | Bobby Gonzales | Sabah | 10 |
| 7 | Adrian Dario Trinidad | PLUS | 9 |
| 8 | Badhri Radzi | Kelantan | 9 |
| 9 | Ahmad Fakri Saarani | Harimau Muda | 9 |
| 10 | Anthony Josip Milicic | Shahzan Muda | 9 |
