= Terengganu F.C. II =

Malaysian football club

Terengganu II
- Full name: Terengganu Football Club II
- Nickname: The Turtles
- Short name: TER II
- Founded: 14 July 2006; 20 years ago as T-Team; 21 November 2017; 8 years ago as Terengganu II
- Ground: Sultan Ismail Nasiruddin Shah Stadium
- Capacity: 15,000
- Chairman: Ahmad Samsuri Mokhtar
- Head coach: Subri Sulong
- League: Piala Presiden (Malaysia)
- Website: http://www.terengganufc.com
Home colours	Away colours

Terengganu Football Club II (Malay: Kelab Bola Sepak Terengganu II) or simply Terengganu II, is a feeder club for Terengganu based in Kuala Terengganu, Terengganu, Malaysia. The club currently plays in the Piala Presiden.

The club was actually founded as T-Team on 14 July 2006 before changed its name to Terengganu II in 2017 and became the reserve team of Terengganu Football Club. The club is widely known as The Turtles.

== History ==
=== Early years as T-Team (2006–2016) ===
The club was founded on 14 July 2006 as T-Team. The club was formed after the Football Association of Kuala Terengganu District decided to send a football club to compete in the Malaysian League. T-Team began competing in the 2008 Malaysia FAM League, winning the competition unbeaten with 11 wins and three draws from 14 matches to secure promotion to the Malaysia Premier League for the 2009 season. The club continued its rapid rise by finishing as runners-up in the Premier League in 2009, earning promotion to the Malaysia Super League for the 2010 season. T-Team finished seventh in its debut Super League campaign, establishing itself in the top division. The club subsequently adopted the name T-Team Titans in an effort to strengthen its identity and attract support from the local community.

During the following seasons, T-Team experienced mixed results in the Super League, finishing ninth in 2011 before placing eighth and tenth in 2012 and 2013, respectively. The club narrowly avoided relegation in 2014, finishing eleventh, before returning to the Premier League in 2015. Under the management of Tomislav Steinbrückner, T-Team finished third in the second division that season, with Uzbekistani striker Farhod Tadjiyev emerging as the league's leading scorer for the club with 18 goals. T-Team returned to the Malaysia Super League in 2016 and finished seventh, while also reaching the semi-finals of the 2016 Malaysia Cup. The club continued to compete in the top division in 2017, finishing ninth under Indonesian head coach Rahmad Darmawan. However, the promotion of Terengganu to the Malaysia Super League for the 2018 season led to a restructuring of the state's professional football system.

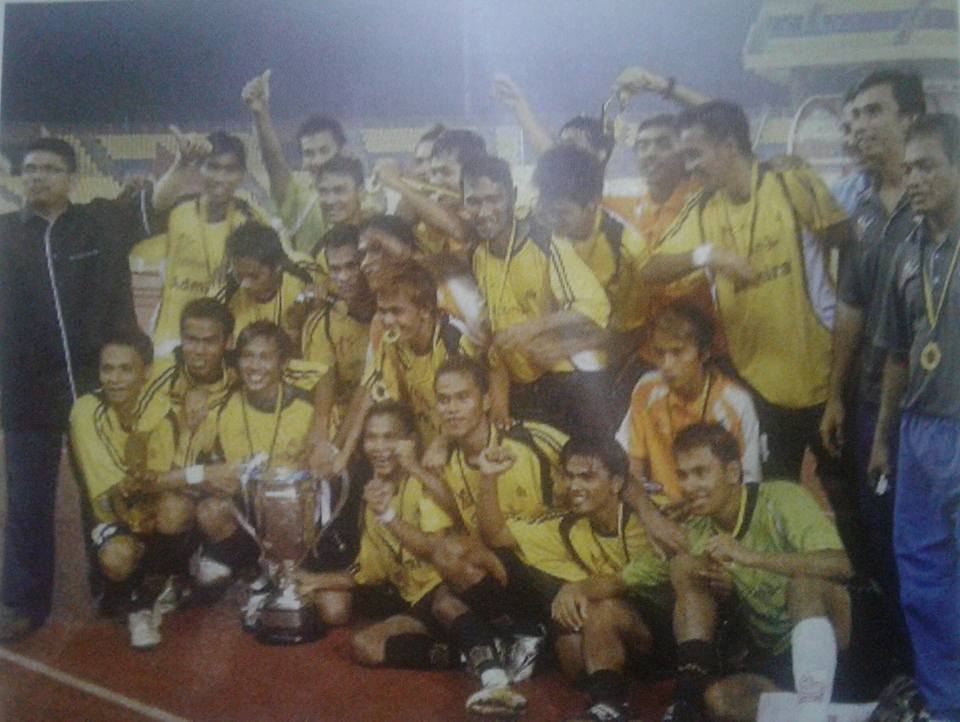
T-Team squad during their 2008 Malaysia FAM League title celebration.

=== Merger with Terengganu FA and reorganisation (2018–present) ===
On 21 November 2017, T-Team announced that it would cease operating as an independent senior club and be absorbed into the newly restructured Terengganu. The decision was made by the Football Association of Terengganu to establish a unified club structure, with Terengganu serving as the first team and T-Team being renamed Terengganu II as its reserve team. The restructuring followed Terengganu's promotion to the Super League and was intended to reduce operating costs, streamline the state's football administration and improve the development of local players. The move was intended to reduce operating costs, which had risen from approximately RM3 million at T-Team's establishment to RM12 million in 2017, and to strengthen the development of local players.

Despite finishing ninth in the 2017 Malaysia Super League, T-Team's conversion into a reserve team meant that Terengganu II was demoted to the 2018 Malaysia Premier League. Under head coach Mustafa Kamal, Terengganu II struggled in the 2018 Malaysia Premier League, finishing eleventh out of 12 teams and facing relegation to the third-tier Malaysia FAM League. Mustafa Kamal subsequently resigned, with his assistant, Tengku Hazman, taking charge for the inaugural 2018 Malaysia Challenge Cup. Despite their disappointing league campaign, head coach Tengku Hazman succeeded in leading his charges to win the tournament, beating UKM 4–2 on aggregate in the final. In the second leg at the Sultan Ismail Nasiruddin Shah Stadium, Akanni Sunday Wasiu scored twice in a 2–0 victory to secure the club's first Malaysia Challenge Cup title.

In December 2018, Terengganu II was granted a reprieve by the Malaysian Football League and retained its place in the Premier League after Terengganu City, champions of the 2018 Malaysia FAM Cup, were denied promotion because of unpaid wages owed to players and staff. The club subsequently improved its league performance, finishing fourth in the 2019 Malaysia Premier League. In the 2020 season, Terengganu II finished second after the league was shortened to a single round-robin format because of the COVID-19 pandemic. The team collected 22 points from 11 matches, although its reserve-team status made it ineligible for promotion to the Malaysia Super League..

Terengganu II continued to compete in the Malaysia Premier League in the following seasons, serving primarily as a development side for players progressing towards the senior team. The club finished third in the 2021 season and fourth in 2022, the final edition of the Malaysia Premier League before the competition was discontinued as part of a restructuring of the Malaysian league system.

== Team image ==
=== Crest and colours ===
The T-Team crest featured a distinctive design that reflected the club's identity and its association with Terengganu. The logo incorporated the club's name and visual elements associated with its nickname, the Titans. The crest was used during the club's independent existence before T-Team was rebranded as Terengganu II in 2017 following the restructuring of football in the state of Terengganu.

Crest of T-Team (2006–2017)

== Stadium ==
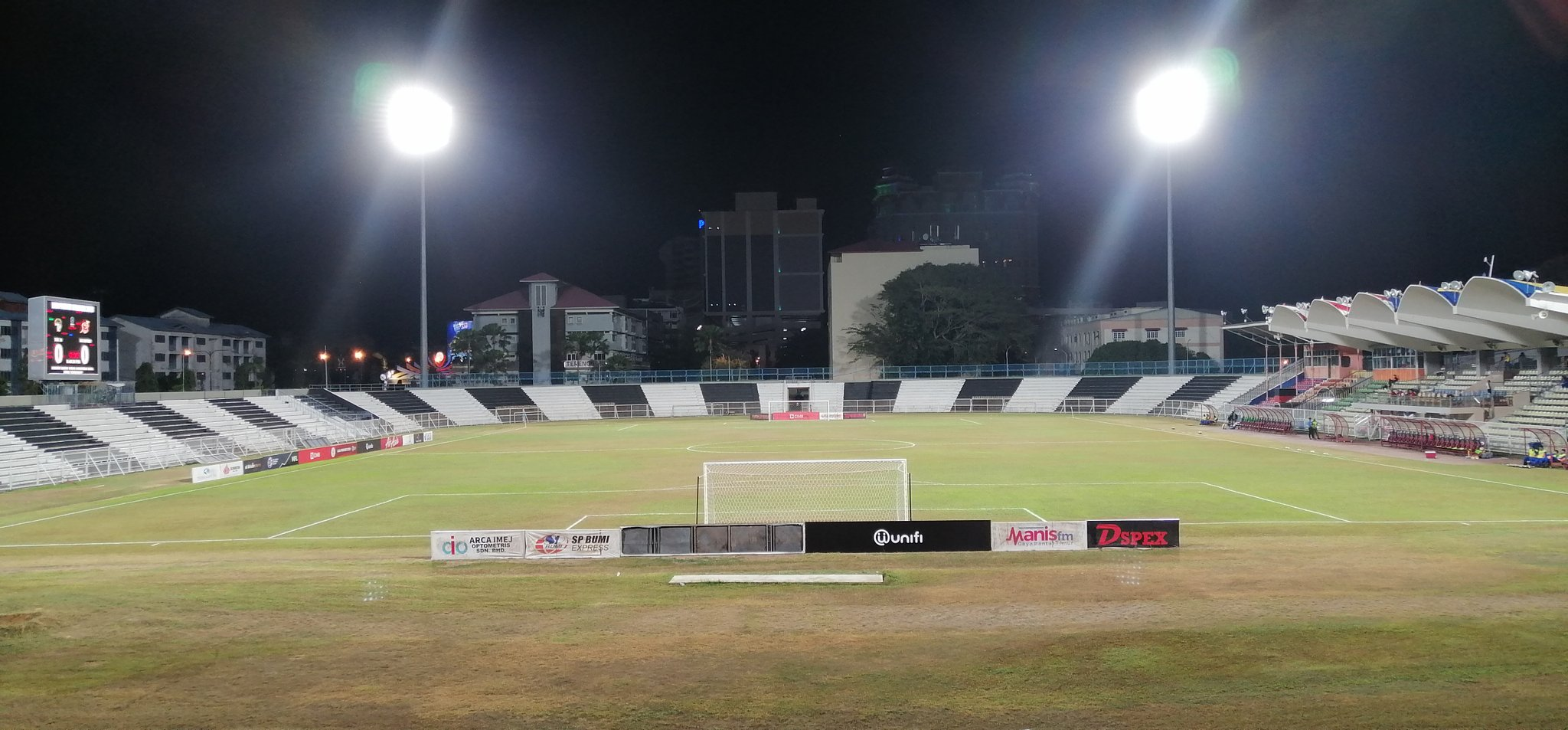
Sultan Ismail Nasiruddin Shah Stadium

The club currently uses the Sultan Ismail Nasiruddin Shah Stadium, Kuala Terengganu, Terengganu, Malaysia as their home venue.

The capacity of the stadium is 25,000.

== Kit suppliers and shirt sponsors ==
=== Sponsorship ===
Period	Kit manufacturer	Shirt sponsor
2007–2012	(Malaysia) Admiral	No sponsors
2013	(Italy) Kappa	EPIC
2014	(New Zealand) Line 7	EPIC
2015	(Malaysia) Eutag	EPIC
2016	(Malaysia) Kobert	Terengganu Incorporated
2017	(Japan) Mizuno	Chicken Cottage
2018	(Malaysia) Kobert	Chicken Cottage
2019	(Malaysia) Al-Ikhsan	Terengganu Incorporated

== Development squad ==
=== Terengganu II (U-20) ===
Terengganu II competes in Malaysia President Cup.

No.	Name	Nationality	Position	D.O.B
Goalkeepers
1	Muhammad Firdaus Azmi	(Malaysia)	GK	1999
28	Muhammad Shazwan Yusoff	(Malaysia)	GK	2000
Defenders
2	Wan Muhd Badrulmuhayat Wan Ismail	(Malaysia)	RB, RWB	2000
3	Muhamad Azam Mohd Razali	(Malaysia)	LB, LWB	1999
4	Ahmad Zafri Zakaria	(Malaysia)	CB	1999
5	Muhammad Amirul Zainudin	(Malaysia)	CB	2000
7	Faris Ikhmal Mamat	(Malaysia)	RB, RWB	2000
19	Muhammad Firdaus Rusdi	(Malaysia)	LB, LWB	12/12/99
21	Muhammad Syafiq Danial Mohd Romzi	(Malaysia)	CB	1999
23	Nik Muhd Adam Fitri Nik Soh	(Malaysia)	RB, RWB	1/2/99
24	Muhammad Azrul Jaffri	(Malaysia)	CB, RB	22/1/99
Midfielders
6	Muhd Nur Azfar Fikri Azhar	(Malaysia)	CM	5/2/00
8	Muhammad Syaiful Haqim Shahrul	(Malaysia)	CM	26/6/99
9	Nik Muhd Isham Mohd Illahi	(Malaysia)	RM, RW	2000
10	Muhd Syahmi Mohd Khazani	(Malaysia)	AM, CM	2000
14	Muhd Fahmi Numan Mohamad	(Malaysia)	AM, CM	2000
16	Wan Alif Aiman Rosmaidi	(Malaysia)	CM, DM	1999
17	Aqil Danish Azman	(Malaysia)	CM	2000
20	Muhammad Hisyam Ismail	(Malaysia)	RW, RM	2000
25	Ahmad Nur Rahman Abdul Rasid	(Malaysia)	LW, LM	2000
27	Azrul Irfan Mohd Ros	(Malaysia)	RW, RM	1999
30	Muhammad Anid Arami Ismail	(Malaysia)	AM, CM	2000
Forwards
11	Muhd Isa Raman	(Malaysia)	ST	2000
13	Mohd Yaumizzaman Kamarul Hatta	(Malaysia)	ST	1999
18	Ahmad Lukman Nul Hakim Zakaria	(Malaysia)	ST	1999
22	Wan Arif Hakimi Wan Ahmad	(Malaysia)	ST	2000

=== Terengganu IV (U-19) ===
Terengganu IV competes in Malaysia Youth Cup.

No.	Name	Nationality	Position	D.O.B
Goalkeepers
1	Muhammad Faiz Hakimi Marzuki	(Malaysia)	GK	2001
18	Afham Aizat Zakaria	(Malaysia)	GK	2002
24	Ahmad Irfan Ibrahim	(Malaysia)	GK	2001
Defenders
2	Muhd Adib Qusyairie Salim	(Malaysia)	RB/RWB	2002
3	Nik Ikmal Nik Ahmad Affandi	(Malaysia)	LB/LWB	2001
4	Syakiman Aqashah Fadzal	(Malaysia)	CB	2001
6	Muhammad Safwan Mazlan	(Malaysia)	CB	2002
7	Muhammad Rizalmi Ikhwan Rozai	(Malaysia)	CB	2002
12	Ahmad Sufian Syamsul Rizal	(Malaysia)	LB/LWB	2001
14	Muhammad Faris Mazelih	(Malaysia)	CB	2002
16	Muhammad Haziq Yusoff	(Malaysia)	RB/RWB	2001
22	Ahmad Basharuddin Wahab	(Malaysia)	CB/RB/LB	2002
26	Nur Aimal Akif Azminoorkamal	(Malaysia)	LB/LWB	2002
Midfielders
5	Muhammad Shahrul Makasuf	(Malaysia)	CM/DM	2001
8	Muhammad Amar Syahmi Mohd Asbi	(Malaysia)	CM	2001
10	Muhammad Syahir Mohd Faudzi	(Malaysia)	AM/CM	2002
11	Ahmad Aqil Asyraf Awang	(Malaysia)	LM/LW	2002
19	Muhammad Syahir Aqil Mohd Zaidy	(Malaysia)	CM	2002
20	Muhammad Rizuan Muda	(Malaysia)	AM/CM	2001
21	Nur Muhammad Alamin Mohd Zahid	(Malaysia)	DM/CM	2002
23	Muhammad Aiman Hakimi Mah Husin	(Malaysia)	RW/RM	200`
25	Ikmal Zulhaika Mazlan	(Malaysia)	LW/LM	2002
28	Muhammad Zahin Raimi Zamani	(Malaysia)	DM/CM	2002
29	Muhammad Amir Ahza Azma	(Malaysia)	RM/RW	2002
Forwards
9	Mohd Khala'if Mohd Naskam	(Malaysia)	ST	2001
13	Khairul Hafizuddin Omar Baki	(Malaysia)	ST	2002
17	Nik Muhd Isah Mohd Ilahi	(Malaysia)	ST	2002
27	Muhammad Hazwan Khusyairie Hazrim	(Malaysia)	ST	2001

ASource:

== Management and staff ==
Position	Name
Chairman	(Malaysia) Ahmad Samsuri Mokhtar
General manager	(Malaysia) Che Wan Mohd Azlizan Che Wan Abu Bakar
Team manager	(Malaysia) Mohammed Afiff
Assistant manager	(Malaysia) Mohd Syahrizan Mohd Zain
Head coach	(Malaysia) Subri Sulong
Assistant coach	(Japan) Kodai Tanaka (Malaysia) Aqeel Harris
Goalkeeping coach	(Malaysia) Aliff Rahman
Fitness coach	(Malaysia) Syed Mohd Nasir Mat Akih
Fitness coach	(Malaysia) Hariesh Kumar
Team doctor	(Malaysia) Marzuki Abdullah (Malaysia) Mohd Shahrul Faiz Mohd Noor
Physiotherapist	(Malaysia) Mark Lee Soong Keen
Masseur	(Malaysia) Asyraf Naim Ying
Kitman	(Malaysia) Elvis Loh Jun You

== Honours ==
=== Domestic competitions ===
==== League ====
- Malaysia FAM League
  - Winners (1): 2008
- Malaysia Premier League
  - Runners-up (1): 2009

==== Cups ====
- Malaysia Challenge Cup
  - Winners (1): 2018
- MFL Cup
  - Winners (1): 2023

=== Pre-season competitions ===
- Shah Alam City Cup
  - Winners (1): 2021
- Terengganu Chief Minister's Cup
  - Winners (1): 2022

== Award winners ==
=== Domestic ===
- Best Young Player of the Season
  - (Malaysia) Safawi Rasid (2016)

=== Others ===
- Fair Play Award
  - 2017

== Notable players ==
T-Team players only (2006–2017)

=== International capped players ===
AFC/OFC.: (Indonesia) Patrich Wanggai; (Nepal) Rohit Chand; (Uzbekistan) Dilshod Sharofetdinov; (Uzbekistan) Farhod Tadjiyev; (Uzbekistan) Sadriddin Abdullaev	CAF.: (Cameroon) Yannick N'Djeng; (Mali) Abdoulaye Maïga; (Mali) Mamadou Samassa; (Rwanda) Jimmy Mulisa; (Zambia) Zachariah Simukonda	UEFA.: (Bosnia and Herzegovina) Damir Ibrić; (Croatia) Josip Milardović; (Croatia) Tomislav Bušić; (Netherlands) George Boateng	CONMEBOL/ CONCACAF.: (Brazil) Patrick Cruz

== Managerial history ==
Head coach	Year	Notes
As T-Team
(Malaysia) Hasnan Ahmad	2006–2007	
(Malaysia) Badrulhisham Abdullah	2008	2008 Malaysia FAM League
(Malaysia) Che Ku Marzuki	2009–2010	
(Malaysia) Yunus Alif	2011–2012	
(England) Peter Butler	2013	
(Portugal) Eduardo Almeida	2013	
(Malaysia) Che Ku Marzuki (caretaker) (2)	2013	
(Malaysia) Azraai Khor	2013–2014	
(Malaysia) Anuar Abu Bakar (caretaker)	2014	
(Croatia) Tomislav Steinbrückner	2015	
(Indonesia) Rahmad Darmawan	2016–2017	
As Terengganu II
(Malaysia) Mustaffa Kamal	2017–2018	
(Malaysia) Tengku Hazman	2018–2019	2018 Malaysia Challenge Cup
(Malaysia) Roshaidi Wahab	2020–2021	
(Malaysia) Badrul Afzan Razali	2021–2022	
(Malaysia) Hairuddin Omar	2023–2025	2023 MFL Cup
(Malaysia) Subri Sulong	2025–present	

== Season by season record ==
As of 7 March 2020

Season	League										FA Cup	Malaysia Cup /Challenge Cup	Asia	Top scorer	
Season	Division	P	W	D	L	F	A	GD	Pts	Pos	FA Cup	Malaysia Cup /Challenge Cup	Asia	Name	Goals
As T-Team
2008	FAM League	14	11	3	0	36	3	+33	36	1st	R1	DNQ	–		
2009	Premier League	24	17	6	1	58	11	+47	57	2nd	QF	DNQ	–	(Malaysia) Haris Safwan	26
2010	Super League	26	10	8	8	33	26	+7	38	7th	QF	GR	–	(Malaysia) Haris Safwan	15*
2011	Super League	26	9	4	13	35	40	-5	31	9th	R1	SF	–	(Malaysia) Indra Putra Mahayuddin	17
2012	Super League	26	10	5	11	35	36	-1	35	8th	QF	GS	–	(Malaysia) Zairo Anuar Zalani	13
2013	Super League	22	5	4	13	19	33	-14	19	10th	R2	GS	–	(Malaysia) Abdul Latiff Suhaimi	7
2014	Super League	22	6	6	10	21	28	-7	24	11th	R2	GS	–	(Indonesia) Patrich Wanggai	6
2015	Premier League	22	12	6	4	50	27	+23	42	3rd	R2	GR	–	(Uzbekistan) Farhod Tadjiyev	18
2016	Super League	22	7	6	9	30	34	-4	27	7th	R2	SF	–	(Brazil) Patrick Cruz	13
2017	Super League	22	7	5	10	30	45	-15	23	9th	R3	GR	–	(Uzbekistan) Farhod Tadjiyev (Uzbekistan) Dilshod Sharofetdinov (Malaysia) Nor Hakim	6
As Terengganu II
2018	Premier League	20	4	5	11	22	34	-12	17	11th	DNQ	Champions	–	(Nigeria) Akanni-Sunday Wasiu	20
2019	Premier League	20	8	6	16	21	24	-3	30	4th	DNQ	SF	–	(Japan) Bruno Suzuki	13
2020	Premier League	11	7	1	3	17	14	+3	22	2nd	Cancelled	Cancelled	–	(Ghana) Jordan Mintah	7

Champions	Runners-up	Third Place	Promoted	Relegated

- P = Played
- W = Games won
- D = Games drawn
- L = Games lost
- F = Goals for
- A = Goals against
- GD = Goal difference
- Pts = Points
- Pos = Final position
- N/A = No answer
- QR1 = First Qualifying Round
- QR2 = Second Qualifying Round
- QR3 = Third Qualifying Round
- QR4 = Fourth Qualifying Round
- RInt = Intermediate Round
- R1 = Round 1
- R2 = Round 2
- R3 = Round 3
- R4 = Round 4
- R5 = Round 5
- R6 = Round 6
- GR = Group Stage
- QF = Quarter-finals
- SF = Semi-finals
- RU = Runners-up
- S = Shared
- W = Winners

== Affiliate clubs ==
- Terengganu
- Hanelang
- Terengganu City
