= Kuala Muda Naza F.C. =

Malaysian football club

Naza FC
- Full name: Naza Football Club
- Nickname: The Blues Yellow
- Founded: 2004; 22 years ago
- Dissolved: 2015; 11 years ago
- Ground: Darul Aman Stadium, Alor Setar, Kedah
- Capacity: 32,387

Naza Football Club (Malay: Kelab Bola Sepak Naza) was a football club competing in the Malaysian Super League. The club was based in Kuala Muda, Kedah. It was a product of the Naza Group of Companies.

== History ==
Established in 2004 as part of the Naza Group of Companies' sports initiatives, the club quickly rose through the ranks of Malaysian football. Kuala Muda Naza F.C.'s most notable achievement came in the 2007–08 season when they clinched the Malaysia Premier League title, earning promotion to the Malaysia Super League. In their debut Super League season, they secured a respectable ninth-place finish. However, financial challenges led to the club's withdrawal from the league in 2010, and it was officially dissolved in 2015.

== Honours ==
Title	Winners	Runners-up
Division 2/Premier League	2007–08	

== Kit manufacturer and shirt sponsor ==
Manufacturer
Spain	Joma
Sponsor
Malaysia	Modenas and Naza

== Notable players ==
- (Malaysia) Liew Kit Kong
- (Malaysia) Akmal Rizal
- (Chile) Cristian Carrasco
- (Nigeria) Ekene Ikenwa
- (Malaysia) Azizon Abdul Kadir

== Coaches ==
Year	Coach
2008–2010	(Brazil) Stefano Cugurra
2008	(Malaysia) K. Devan
2007	(Malaysia) Ahmad Shafie
2005–2007	(Malaysia) Zainal Abidin Abu Bakar
