= FELDA United F.C. =

Malaysian football club

Felda United
- Full name: Felda United Football Club
- Nickname: Felda Fighters
- Short name: FUFC
- Founded: 19 January 2007; 19 years ago
- Dissolved: 2020; 6 years ago
- Owner: Malaysian Federal Land Development Authority
Home colours	Away colours	Third colours

Felda United Football Club was a Malaysian football club based in Jengka, Pahang, owned by the Malaysian Federal Land Development Authority (FELDA). The club used to compete in Malaysian football league system until 2020.

The team last played in the 2020 Malaysia Super League season, which is Malaysia's top flight league. The club was able to play in the Malaysia Super League after being crowned Malaysian second-tier or second division Malaysia Premier League champions in 2018. In 2020, the club made the announcement that they will no longer participate in the Malaysian football league. A lack of financial support was cited by the club officials for making such decision to not participate in the national competition.

== History ==
Felda United Football Club was formed on 19 January 2007 to participate in the Malaysian Football League, starting with the 2007 Malaysia FAM Cup. It was initiated by Felda and was officiated by the then Deputy Prime Minister of Malaysia, Najib Razak on 19 January 2007. As football is the number one sport in Malaysia with a large number of supporters, Felda decided to jump into the industry due to the infrastructure and facilities provided on Felda land. The club embarked their journey in the third-tier division league, the Malaysian FAM Cup.

=== The club's tracks ===
The club has been one of the more consistent teams in the 2007 Malaysian FAM Cup after placing third, despite their fresh appearance in the industry. The club was promoted into the Premier League in 2008. Felda United played in the Premier League for 3 seasons and was promoted into the Super League, after being champion of 2010 Malaysia Premier League. After playing consistently in the Super League for 3 seasons, the team had a downfall where they were back in the Premier League for 2014. However, it was not the end for The Fighters as they were placed second in the Premier League. 2018 came with sorrow as the club was again demoted into the Premier League and the Football Association of Malaysia denied their license. In 2019, The Fighters got in the league with an approved club license from the FAM.

=== The financial downfall ===
Towards the end of the 2018 season, the club had a bump on their road of finance. Since September to November, the club did not manage to pay the players and coaching staff. The club's former coach B. Sathianathan mentioned that he exposed this issue to fight for everyone's rights. Shukor Adan represented the club to get legal consultation from the FAM on the overdue payment. The former captain also mentioned that he has been with the club for five seasons and none of these happened before. The club had to drop most of their key players, such as Syamim Yahya, Wan Zack Haikal, Farizal Harun and all the club's import players. ) Mohd Nidzam Jamil said the club signed brand new players for the 2019, and youth players were promoted to play the Super League. In January 2019, the club's president Anuar Malek said that they paid at least a monthly salary, to show that the management is committed in trying to rectify the financial problem.

=== Withdrawal from the Malaysian football league ===
Following the club's decision to withdraw from the Malaysian football league competition in 2020, it was announced that 16 staff members would be laid off. In a press statement, Felda Holdings Berhad stated:

Felda wishes to inform that FUFC's participation is only for the 2020 season. Starting 2021, FUFC will no longer take part in the M-League. Sixteen FUFC staff will be compensated for the termination of their services in accordance with the terms of their appointments and a notice for the handover of duties has been given to them on September 17, 2020.

== Grounds ==
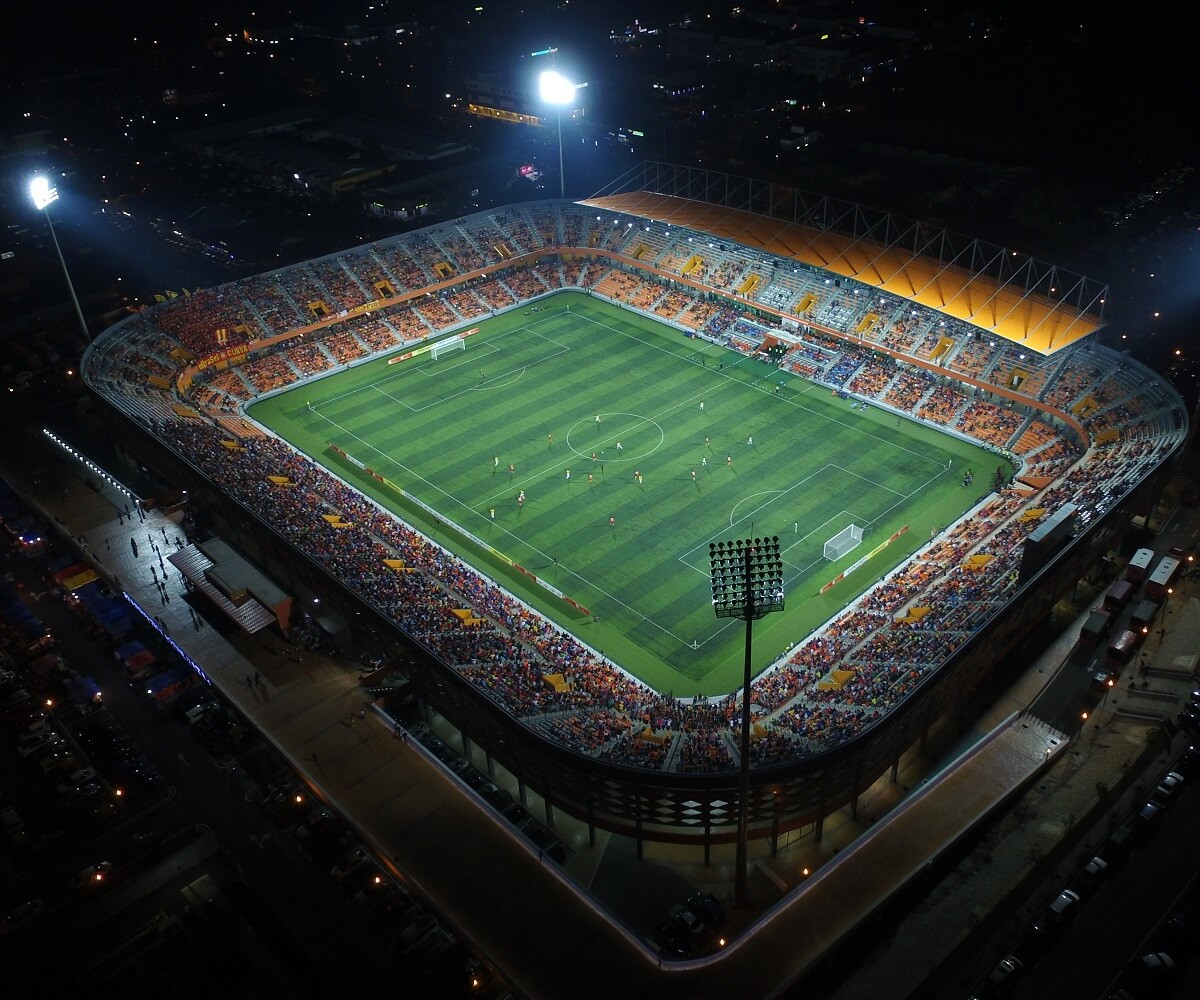
Tun Abdul Razak Stadium in Jengka from night aerial view.

Felda United's main ground was the Tun Abdul Razak Stadium in Jengka, Pahang. The team officially started playing in the stadium in 2016. In their early involvement in the Malaysian Football league, they played in the Petronas Stadium in Bangi. They also played in the Petaling Jaya Stadium and Selayang Stadium, Hang Jebat Stadium, and Kuala Lumpur Stadium, before moving to the Tun Abdul Razak Stadium for 2016 Malaysia Super League.

== Sponsorship ==
Period	Sportswear	Main sponsor	Other sponsor
2007			none
2007-08	Adidas	Celcom	none
2009	Kappa	Streamyx	Power Root, Felda D'Saji
2010	Kappa	TM, Felda Prodata Systems	Power Root, Felda D'Saji
2011	Kappa	Felda Prodata Systems	Felda D'Saji
2012	Kappa	Felda Prodata Systems, Felda D'Saji	Felda Sawari
2013	Umbro	FGV	Felda Prodata Systems
2014	Puma	Felda	Koperasi Permodalan Felda Berhad, FGV
2015	Puma	Felda	Koperasi Permodalan Felda Berhad
2016	FBT	Felda	
2017	FBT	Felda	
2018	FBT	Felda, Tenera Hotel	Felda Prodata Systems, Felda D'Saji, D'Mart, AirAsia, Animasia, ATF Sport Taping
2019	FBT	Felda, Ironco, Grand Borneo	Felda Prodata Systems, Felda D'Saji, D'Mart, AirAsia, Animasia, ATF Sport Taping
2020	FBT	Felda, Tanah Melayu Capital	

== Players (2020) ==
=== Under-21 ===
No	Name	Nat.	Position	Date of birth
Goalkeeper
22	Muhammad Amirul Hakimi Rodzan	(Malaysia)	GK	2001
25	Muhammad Danial Asraf Mohd Rani	(Malaysia)	GK	2000
30	Muhammad Hazril Azni Abdul Ghani	(Malaysia)	GK	2000
Defenders
5	Harith Marzuqi Zailaney	(Malaysia)	CB	2000
11	Noriqmal Nor Azmi	(Malaysia)	LB, LWB	2000
13	Muhammad Daniel Aiman Che Zambil	(Malaysia)	CB	2/9/99
15	Muhammad Danial Romizan	(Malaysia)	CB	8/5/2002
21	Zainal Abidin Jamil	(Malaysia)	CB	5/8/99
23	Abdul Rashid Abdul Razak	(Malaysia)	RB, RWB	2000
Midfielders
6	Muhammad Firdaus Rosli	(Malaysia)	DM, CM	2000
7	Muhammad Solihin Akmal Abdul Razak	(Malaysia)	RW, LW	2000
8	Mohamad Saiful Jamaluddin	(Malaysia)	CM	2000
12	Mohamad Daniel Haqiem Mohd Razali Abdullah	(Malaysia)	LW, LM	2000
14	Muhamad Syahir Abdul Rahman	(Malaysia)	RM, RW	2000
16	Azwan Azman	(Malaysia)	CM	1999
17	Edy Luqman Muhamad	(Malaysia)	AM, CM	2000
20	Khairul Haikal Adam	(Malaysia)	RW, RM	1999
29	Muhammad Adam Malique Daniel Ady	(Malaysia)	LW, LM	2000
Forwards
9	Muhammad Nabil Iman Muhammad Fadzil	(Malaysia)	ST	1999
10	Muhammad Haziq Man	(Malaysia)	ST, LW	2000
19	Mohammad Haizal Jine Adam	(Malaysia)	ST	2000
24	Mohamad Arrieffahmi Mohd Azam	(Malaysia)	ST	1999
27	Muhammad Norazwan Mohd Amir	(Malaysia)	ST	2000

=== Under-19 ===
No.	Name	Nat.	Position	Date of birth
Goalkeeper
1	Amirul Rizlan Azami	(Malaysia)	GK	2005
20	Azrul Nazhan Mohd Nasrah	(Malaysia)	GK	2004
22	Muhammad Aliff Hanbali Nor Azman	(Malaysia)	GK	2004
Defenders
3	Muhammad Wazif Nazarail	(Malaysia)	CB	2005
12	Muhammad Yazid Nor Azmi	(Malaysia)	LB, LWB	2004
14	Danish Arfan Mohd Shukri	(Malaysia)	LB, LWB	2004
15	Muhammad Zairol Arief Abdullah	(Malaysia)	CB	2004
16	Muhammad Iqmal Hazim Muhamed Sufian	(Malaysia)	RB, RWB	2004
19	Muhammad Arif Ridhwan Ruslan	(Malaysia)	RB, RWB	2004
27	Muhammad Danial Hariz Mohd Faizal	(Malaysia)	CB	2004
30	Muhammad Harif Mustaqim Hamdan	(Malaysia)	CB, LB, RB	2004
Midfielders
4	Muhammad Haikal Abdul Hamid	(Malaysia)	CM	2004
5	Muhammad Asyraf Ahmad Kamal Tajul Arifin	(Malaysia)	LW, LM	2005
7	Luqman Hakim Sukemi	(Malaysia)	RM, RW	2004
8	Muhammad Farid Aiman Anuar Amri	(Malaysia)	AM, CM	2004
11	Muhammad Amir Danial Muhamad Herman	(Malaysia)	LW, LM	2005
13	Mohammad Fakrul Amin Ahmad Roslizan	(Malaysia)	RM, RW	2006
17	Muhamad Raihan Ramlan	(Malaysia)	CM	2004
18	Nur Aiman Anuar	(Malaysia)	DM	2005
24	Danial Luqman Ibrahim	(Malaysia)	DM, CM	2004
25	Mohd Hafiz A.Aziz	(Malaysia)	CM	2004
26	Mohamad Ikmal Rizal Zaman Huri	(Malaysia)	CM	2004
28	Mohammad Akimie Amran	(Malaysia)	CM	2004
Forwards
6	Muhammad Alif Danial Muhd Anuar	(Malaysia)	ST, AM	2004
9	Suhaimi Abu	(Malaysia)	ST	2004
10	Nik Muhammad Ezwan Nik Ahmad Tajul Ariff	(Malaysia)	ST	2004
21	Mohamad Aiman Fahmi Mohd Azam	(Malaysia)	ST	2004
29	Mohamad Haziq Hafiz Mohd Hidrus	(Malaysia)	ST	2006

== Officials (2020) ==
- President: Anuar Malek
- Deputy president: Mohd Isa Abu Kassim
- Vice president 1: Anuar Malek
- Vice president 2: Shamsul Anwar Sulaiman
- Secretary general: Zulkarnain Muhammad
- Treasurer: Shahrin Mohd Ali

=== Team managers ===
Years	Name
2007 - 2012	(Malaysia) Faisal Zakariah
2013	(Malaysia) K. Devan
2014 - 2016	(Malaysia) Jamaludin Ahmad
2016	(Malaysia) Zulkarnain Mohamad
2017 - 2020	(Malaysia) Jamaludin Ahmad

=== Coaches ===
Years	Name	Achievement
2007 - 2009	(Malaysia) Reduan Abdullah	
2009	(Malaysia) Ahmad Fairuz Mohd Yunus (caretaker)	
2009 - 2012	(Malaysia) E. Elavarasan	2010 Premier League champions
2013	(Malaysia) K. Devan	
2014 - 2016	(Malaysia) Irfan Bakti Abu Salim	2014 Premier League runner-up 2016 Super League runner up
2016	(Malaysia) Mohamad Nik (caretaker)	2016 Super League runner up
2016 - 2017	(Malaysia) Azmi Mohamed	2016 Super League runner up
February 2017	(Malaysia) Mohamad Nik (caretaker)	
February 2017 - November 2018	(Malaysia) B. Sathianathan	2018 Premier League champions
November 2018 - November 2020	(Malaysia) Mohd Nidzam Jamil	

== Honours and achievements ==
=== League ===
- Malaysia Super League
  - Runners-up: 2016
- Malaysia Premier League
  - Winners: 2010, 2018
  - Runners-up: 2014

=== Cups ===
- Malaysia FA Cup
  - Runners-up: 2014

=== Achievements ===
Year	League		Cups		
Year	Division	Position	FA	Malaysia	AFC
2007	Malaysia FAM League	3rd	Not participated	Not participated	Not participated
2007–08	Malaysia Premier League	6/13	Quarter-finals	Not participated	Not participated
2009	Malaysia Premier League	6/13	Round of 32	Not participated	Not participated
2010	Malaysia Premier League	Champions	Round of 16	Group stage	Not participated
2011	Malaysia Super League	11/14	Quarter-finals	Quarter-finals	Not participated
2012	Malaysia Super League	10/14	Round of 32	Quarter-finals	Not Participated
2013	Malaysia Super League	11/12	Round of 32	Group stage	Not participated
2014	Malaysia Premier League	Runners-up	Runners-up	Semi-finals	Not participated
2015	Malaysia Super League	5/12	Round of 32	Semi-finals	Not participated
2016	Malaysia Super League	Runners-up	Round of 16	Quarter-finals	Not participated
2017	Malaysia Super League	3/12	Second round	Semi-finals	Group stage
2018	Malaysia Premier League	Champions	Quarter-finals	Quarter-finals	Not participated

== AFC competitions ==
=== Performance in AFC competitions ===
- AFC Cup: 1 Appearance
  - 2017: Group stage

=== AFC clubs ranking ===
As of 1 December 2017.

Current Rank	Country	Team
119	(Malaysia)	Felda United
120	(Jordan)	Al-Ahli
121	(Turkmenistan)	Ahal
122	(India)	East Bengal
123	(Kyrgyzstan)	Alay Osh
124	(Thailand)	Bangkok United

== Continental record ==
Season	Competition	Round	Club	Home	Away	Aggregate
2017	AFC Cup	Group G	(Singapore) Tampines Rovers	1–3	2–1	4th
2017	AFC Cup	Group G	(Vietnam) Hà Nội	1–1	4–1	4th
2017	AFC Cup	Group G	(Philippines) Ceres-Negros	0–0	3–0	4th

== See also ==
- Young Fighters F.C.
