= 2003 Johor F.C. season =

Johor FC
2003 season
- Owner: Johor Corporation
- Manager: Haji Tamyes Abdul Rahim
- Head Coach: Azuan Zain
- Stadium: Pasir Gudang Stadium
- Perdana 1: 7th (relegated)
- FA Cup: Quarter-finals
- Malaysia Cup: Group stage
- Top goalscorer: League: Jon Angelucci (17); All: Jon Angelucci (25)
- Biggest win: 5–1 vs Malacca (H), 6 September 2003, Malaysia Cup
- Biggest defeat: 1–4 vs Pahang (A), 29 March 2003, Perdana 1
Home colours	Away colours	Third colours

The 2003 season was Johor Football Club's 31th season in club history. It was their second season in the Malaysian first division.

Johor FC competed in the 2003 Liga Perdana 1, 2003 Malaysia FA Cup and 2003 Malaysia Cup. In the Liga Perdana, they finished third with 34 points from 24 matches. In the FA Cup, they were eliminated by Perlis in the Quarter finals. In the Malaysia Cup, they only reached the group stage after finishing in third place.

== Season overview ==
The 2003 season proved to be a difficult campaign for Johor FC, as they finished 7th in the Liga Perdana 1 and were relegated for the first time in the club's history. In Malaysia Cup they only reached the group stage after finishing in third place. In FA Cup they performed impressively in the tournament, reaching the quarter-finals before being eliminated by Perlis 4–3 on aggregate.”

==== Perdana 1 ====
Johor FC endured a difficult Liga Perdana 1 campaign, struggling throughout the season and ultimately finishing seventh with 34 points from 24 matches, recording 10 wins, 4 draws, and 10 defeats, with 42 goals scored and 32 conceded for a goal difference of +10. The campaign ran from February to August 2003, with Johor FC finishing behind champions Perak, runners-up Kedah, and third-placed Perlis. Although Johor FC missed out on automatic qualification for the newly formed Malaysia Super League, which was reserved for the top six, the club entered the Super League play-off as one of the teams ranked seventh to tenth. In the play-off, Johor FC defeated Kelantan in the first round before losing to Public Bank FC in the final round on penalties, failing to secure promotion to the Super League. As a result, Johor FC were relegated to the second tier for the first time in the club's history, marking a significant setback after two seasons in the top flight. Notable results included a 4–1 win over Kelantan, a 4–1 win over Melaka Telekom, a 3–1 win over Sarawak, a 2–0 win over eventual champions Perak, a 3–0 away win over Penang, and a 4–0 win over Selangor in the final league match.,

==== FA Cup ====
In the FA Cup, Johor FC's campaign ended in the quarter-finals. Having received a first-round bye, they entered in the second round against Melaka Telekom, winning the first leg 2–0 at home before losing the second leg 1–2 away to advance 3–2 on aggregate. In the quarter-finals, Johor FC won the first leg 1–0 away against Perlis, but lost the second leg 2–4 after extra time at home to be eliminated 3–4 on aggregate.

==== Malaysia Cup ====
The Malaysia Cup was Johor FC's final competition of the 2003 season. In the group stage, Johor FC finished third in Group D with seven points from six matches, recording two wins, one draw, and three defeats, with nine goals scored and nine conceded, missing out on qualification for the knockout stage behind group winners Perak and runners-up Public Bank. Notable group-stage results included a 1–1 draw against Perak and two victories over Melaka, winning 3–1 away and 5–1 at home. However, defeats in both legs against Public Bank and a 0–3 away loss to Perak ended their campaign at the group stage. Public Bank's fellow club side Selangor MPPJ ultimately won the tournament, defeating Sabah 3–0 in the final to become the first non-state club to win the trophy.

== Player Information ==
=== Full Squad ===
Note: Flags indicate national team as defined under FIFA eligibility rules; some limited exceptions apply. Players may hold more than one non-FIFA nationality.

No.	Pos.	Nation	Player
1	GK	MAS	Shamsul Sabtu
2	GK	MAS	G. Jeevananthan
4	DF	MAS	Hamzani Omar
7	DF	AUS	Ivan Zelic
17	MF	MAS	Rizal Sukiman
30	DF	MAS	Musa Handrek
20	MF	MAS	Rezal Zambery
9	FW	AUS	Jon Angelucci
16	MF	MAS	Hairy Azly
33	FW	MAS	Azmi Mohammad
19	MF	MAS	Nor Sharin Mansor

No.	Pos.	Nation	Player
3	GK	MAS	Sany Fahmy
31	FW	MAS	Zami Mohd Noor
27	MF	MAS	Eddy Helmi
10	DF	MAS	Shamsul Sulaiman
8	DF	MAS	Bakhtiar Othman
25	MF	MAS	Fikri Rashid
14	FW	MAS	Khaidir Dom
26	MF	MAS	Kamree Yahya
6	MF	MAS	Henry Saimpon
29	MF	MAS	Idris Abdul Karim

== Competitions ==
=== Overview ===
Competition	First match	Last match	Starting round	Final position	Record							
Competition	First match	Last match	Starting round	Final position	Pld	W	D	L	GF	GA	GD	Win %
Liga Perdana 1	9 February 2003	2 August 2003	Matchday 1	7th	24	10	4	10	42	32	+10	41.67
Malaysia FA Cup	12 March 2003	19 April 2003	Second round	Quarter final	4	2	0	2	5	6	−1	50.00
Malaysia Cup	20 August 2003	6 September 2003	Group stage	Group stage	6	2	1	3	6	18	−12	33.33
Total					34	14	5	15	53	56	−3	41.18

Last updated: 28 October 2026
Source: Competitions

=== Perdana 1 ===
==== Matches ====
Win Draw Loss

9 February 2003 1	Johor FC	1–1	Melaka	Pasir Gudang, Johor
	26' Jonathan Angelucci		38' Arsyah Ayob	Stadium: Stadium Pasir Gudang

15 February 2003 2	Kedah	2–0	Johor FC	Alor Setar, Kedah
	18' Manzoor Azwira Wahid; 56' Ooi Hoe Guan			Stadium: Darul Aman Stadium

22 February 2003 3	Melaka Telekom	1–0	Johor FC	Malacca City, Malacca
	10' Issac Kuffour			Stadium: Hang Tuah Stadium

1 March 2003 4	Sarawak	2–1	Johor FC	Kuching, Sarawak
	2' Wong Sai Kong; 62' Robert Eshun		52' Jonathan Angelucci	Stadium: Sarawak Stadium

8 March 2003 5	Johor FC	4–1	Kelantan	Pasir Gudang, Johor
	12' Jonathan Angelucci; 15' Eddy Helmi Manan; 67' Idris Karim; 76' (pen.) Jonathan Angelucci		82' Hardi Ahmad	Stadium: Stadium Pasir Gudang

15 March 2003 6	Perlis	2–1	Johor FC	Kangar, Perlis
	2' Phillimon Chipeta; 3' Phillimon Chipeta		67' Jonathan Angelucci	Stadium: Tuanku Syed Putra Stadium

22 March 2003 7	Johor FC	3–1	Terengganu	Pasir Gudang, Johor
	20' Jonathan Angelucci; 29' Jonathan Angelucci; 63' Rizal Sukiman		56' Mazuki Yusof	Stadium: Stadium Pasir Gudang

29 March 2003 8	Pahang	4–1	Johor FC	Kuantan, Pahang
	5' Hairuddin Omar; 20' Hairuddin Omar; 45' Cristiano Da Silva; 73' Fadzli Saari		75' Jonathan Angelucci	Stadium: Darul Makmur Stadium

5 April 2003 9	Johor FC	3–1	Sabah	Pasir Gudang, Johor
	13' Idris Karim; 48' Hairy Azly Mohamad; 60' Hamzani Omar		90' Jelius Ating	Stadium: Stadium Pasir Gudang

8 April 2003 10	Perak	2–1	Johor FC	Ipoh, Perak
	19' Flavio Rocha; 84' Indra Putra Mahayuddin		74' Jonathan Angelucci	Stadium: Perak Stadium

26 April 2003 11	Johor FC	0–1	Penang	Pasir Gudang, Johor
			83' Gustavo Romero	Stadium: Stadium Pasir Gudang

29 April 2003 13	Selangor	1–0	Johor FC	Petaling Jaya, Selangor
	32' Shahrin Majid			Stadium: Petaling Jaya Stadium

20 May 2003 14	Melaka	1–4	Johor FC	Malacca City, Malacca
	25' Halim Jantan		1' Jonathan Angelucci; 9' Azmi Mohamed; 27' Hairy Azly Muhamad; 90' Jonathan Angelucci	Stadium: Hang Tuah Stadium

24 May 2003 15	Johor FC	1–3	Kedah	Pasir Gudang, Johor
	80' Jonathan Angelucci		10' Amirul Nizam Mahadzir; 52' Zainuddin Ariffin; 69' James William	Stadium: Stadium Pasir Gudang

3 June 2003 16	Johor FC	4–1	Melaka Telekom	Pasir Gudang, Johor
	7' (o.g.) Nazrul Erwan Makmor; 50' Jonathan Angelucci; 52' Hairy Azly Mohamad; 68' Hairy Azly Mohamad		31' (pen.) Issac Kuffour	Stadium: Stadium Pasir Gudang

10 June 2003 17	Johor FC	3–1	Sarawak	Pasir Gudang, Johor
	17' Idris Karim; 60' Jonathan Angelucci; 69' Jonathan Angelucci		45' Robert Eshun	Stadium: Stadium Pasir Gudang

14 June 2003 18	Kelantan	1–1	Johor FC	Kota Bharu, Kelantan
	35' Martin Adamec		29' Idris Karim	Stadium: Sultan Muhammad IV Stadium

21 June 2003 19	Johor FC	1–1	Perlis	Pasir Gudang, Johor
	62' Hairy Azly Mohamad		26' Phillimon Chipeta	Stadium: Stadium Pasir Gudang

28 June 2003 20	Terengganu	1–1	Johor FC	Kuala Terengganu, Terengganu
	25' Seidu Issifu		64' Azmi Mohamad	Stadium: Sultan Mizan Zainal Abidin Stadium

1 July 2003 21	Johor FC	2–1	Pahang	Pasir Gudang, Johor
	31' Henry Saimpon; 62' (o.g.) Cristiano da Silva		65' Cristiano da Silva	Stadium: Stadium Pasir Gudang

5 July 2003 22	Sabah	3–1	Johor FC	Kota Kinabalu, Sabah
	2' Robert Gaspar; 69' Rezuan Aman Khan; 80' Josiah Seton		71' Azmi Mohamed	Stadium: Likas Stadium

8 July 2003 23	Johor FC	2–0	Perak	Pasir Gudang, Johor
	33' Eddy Helmi Manan; 65' Hairy Azly Mohamad			Stadium: Stadium Pasir Gudang

24 July 2003 24	Penang	0–3	Johor FC	George Town, Penang
			27' Rezal Zambery Yahya; 29' Rezal Zambery Yahya; 50' Jonathan Angelucci	Stadium: City Stadium

29 July 2003 25	Penang	0–3	Johor FC	George Town, Penang
			27' Rezal Zambery Yahya; 29' Rezal Zambery Yahya; 50' Jonathan Angelucci	Stadium: City Stadium

2 August 2003 26	Johor FC	4–0	Selangor	Pasir Gudang, Johor
	14' Hairy Azly Mohamad; 47' Hairy Azly Mohamad; 56' Eddy Helmi Manan; 73' Hairy Azly Mohamad			Stadium: Stadium Pasir Gudang

==== Relegation Play-off ====
===== First round =====
6 August 2003 1st leg	Johor FC	1–0	Kelantan	Pasir Gudang, Johor
20:45	31' Ivan Zelic			Stadium: Stadium Pasir Gudang

9 August 2003 2nd leg	Kelantan	1–0 (a.e.t.) (2 – 4 p)	Johor FC	Kota Bharu, Kelantan
20:45	72' Badrul Afzan Razali			Stadium: Sultan Muhammad IV Stadium

===== Final round =====
13 August 2003 1st leg	Public Bank	1–2	Johor FC	Selayang, Selangor
20:45	54' Ivan Ziga		48' Hairy Azly Mohamad; 89' Jonathan Angelucci	Stadium: MPS Stadium

16 August 2003 2nd leg	Johor FC	1–2 (a.e.t.) (2 – 4 p)	Public Bank	Pasir Gudang, Johor
20:45	87' Zami Mohd Noor		64' Ivan Ziga; 79' Ivan Ziga	Stadium: Stadium Pasir Gudang

==== League table ====
Pos	Team	Pld	W	D	L	GF	GA	GD	Pts	Qualification or relegation
1	Perak FA (C)	24	13	8	3	38	22	+16	47	Qualification for the AFC Cup
2	Kedah FA	24	13	6	5	43	17	+26	45	
3	Perlis FA	24	13	6	5	40	23	+17	45	
4	Sabah FA	24	10	8	6	34	22	+12	38	
5	Pahang FA	24	10	6	8	38	33	+5	36	
6	Penang FA	24	11	3	10	29	28	+1	36	
7	Johor FC (R)	24	10	4	10	42	32	+10	34	Relegated to Liga Premier
8	Sarawak FA	24	9	7	8	47	42	+5	34	
9	(Malacca) Melaka Telekom (R)	24	7	11	6	32	34	−2	32	Relegated to Liga Premier
10	Kelantan FA (R)	24	7	7	10	31	52	−21	28	Relegated to Liga Premier
11	Malacca FA (R)	24	5	5	14	24	53	−29	20	Relegated to Liga Premier
12	Selangor FA (R)	24	4	6	14	32	44	−12	18	Relegated to Liga Premier
13	Terengganu FA (R)	24	4	3	17	24	52	−28	15	Relegated to Liga Premier

Source: rsssf.com
(C) Champions; (R) Relegated

Note

- Clubs places 1st to 6th will be entering Liga Super automatically.
- Clubs places 7th to 10th will be entering Liga Super playoffs.
- Clubs places 11th to 13th will be relegating to Liga Premier.

=== Malaysia FA Cup ===
==== First round ====
Win Draw Loss

12 March 2003 1st leg	Johor FC	2–0	Melaka Telekom	Pasir Gudang, Johor
	60' Idris Karim; 90' (pen.) Jonathan Angelucci			Stadium: Stadium Pasir Gudang

19 March 2003 2nd leg	Melaka Telekom	2–1 (3 – 2 agg.)	Johor FC	Malacca City, Malacca
	75' K. Kumaran; 86' Faizal Esahar		5' Jonathan Angelucci	Stadium: Hang Tuah Stadium

==== Quarter final ====
12 April 2003 1st leg	Perlis	0–1	Johor FC	Kangar, Perlis
			73' Jonathan Angelucci	Stadium: Tuanku Syed Putra Stadium

19 April 2003 2nd leg	Johor FC	2–4 (a.e.t.) (3–4 agg.)	Perlis	Pasir Gudang, Johor
	7' Jonathan Angelucci; 58' Hamzani Omar		19' Kelvin Musungu; 35' Adrien Chamrong; 37' Tengku Hazman Raja Hassan; 93' Tengku Hazman Raja Hassan	Stadium: Stadium Pasir Gudang

=== Malaysia Cup ===
==== Group stage ====
Pos	Team	Pld	W	D	L	GF	GA	GD	Pts	Qualification
1	Perak	6	4	1	1	16	7	+9	13	Advance to knockout stage
2	Selangor Public Bank	6	4	0	2	11	8	+3	12	Advance to knockout stage
3	Johor FC	6	2	1	3	9	9	0	7	
4	Melaka	6	1	0	5	6	18	−12	3	

Updated to match(es) played on unknown. Source:

20 August 2003 1	Johor FC	1–1	Perak	Pasir Gudang, Johor
	80' Rezal Zambery Yahya		12' Frank Seator	Stadium: Stadium Pasir Gudang

23 August 2003 2	Melaka	1–3	Johor FC	Malacca City, Malacca
	2' Ahmad Tharmini Saiban		17' Jonathan Angelucci; 45' Ivan Zelic; 60' (pen.) Jonathan Angelucci	Stadium: Hang Tuah Stadium

27 August 2003 3	Johor FC	0–2	Selangor Public Bank	Pasir Gudang, Johor
			18' Ivan Ziga; 41' Ivan Ziga	Stadium: Stadium Pasir Gudang

30 August 2003 4	Selangor Public Bank	1–0	Johor FC	Selayang, Selangor
	50' Ivan Ziga			Stadium: MPS Stadium

3 September 2003 5	Perak	3–0	Johor FC	Ipoh, Perak
	22' V. Saravanan; 38' V. Saravanan; 51' V. Saravanan			Stadium: Perak Stadium

6 September 2003 6	Johor FC	5–1	Melaka	Pasir Gudang, Johor
	21' Azmi Mohamed; 43' Jonathan Angelucci; 62' Azmi Mohamed; 64' Jonathan Angelucci; 79' (pen.) Rezal Zambery Yahya		87' Nafuzi Zain	Stadium: Stadium Pasir Gudang
