= List of Liga Super seasons =

This article contains detailed information on Malaysia Super League, which begins with the 2004 season until current season.

== 2004 ==
The Malaysia Super League (MSL) was introduced for the first time in 2004. It replaced the M-League as the top-most tier for professional Malaysian football clubs.

The season kicked off on February 14, 2004. Pahang FA dominated the season and ended up winning the title by a wide margin and this was down to their efforts in securing the services of the nation's top players prior to the start of the new season. Pahang FA's Indra Putra Mahayuddin was the season's top goalscorer with 15 goals. He remains, until this day, the last Malaysian to win that accolade.

The highest scoring match of the season was Perlis FA 6-2 defeat of Kedah FA on July 31, 2004.

One positive point was Public Bank FC.strong performance at the end of the season. At the time, the Football Association of Malaysia was working to promote clubs as the future of Malaysian football.

=== League table ===
Pos	Team	Pld	W	D	L	GF	GA	GD	Pts	Qualification or relegation
1	Pahang (C)	21	14	5	2	48	29	+19	47	Qualification to AFC Cup group stage and ASEAN Club Championship
2	Public Bank	21	11	5	5	38	29	+9	38	
3	Perlis	21	10	6	5	41	30	+11	36	
4	Perak	21	10	6	5	35	27	+8	36	Qualification to AFC Cup group stage (Note: Perak qualified for the 2005 AFC Cup group stage as 2004 Piala FA winners.)
5	Penang	21	8	3	10	29	38	−9	27	
6	Sabah	21	4	5	12	22	35	−13	17	
7	Sarawak (R)	21	3	7	11	28	38	−10	16	Relegation to Liga Premier
8	Kedah (R)	21	4	3	14	30	45	−15	15	Relegation to Liga Premier

Source: RSSSF
Rules for classification: 1) Points; 2) Goal difference; 3) Number of goals scored.
(C) Champions; (R) Relegated
Notes:

2004 Super League winner

Pahang FA
1st title

=== Top scorers ===
Position	Players	Teams/Clubs	Goals
1	(Malaysia) Indra Putra Mahayuddin	Pahang FA	15
2	(Liberia) Frank Seator	Perak FA	14
3	(Argentina) Gustavo Fuentes (Brazil) Tavares	(Selangor) Public Bank FC; Kedah FA	11
5	(Russia) Vyacheslav Melnikov	Penang FA	10
6	(Australia) Ante Milicic (Guinea-Bissau) Fernando Manuel Co (Slovakia) Ivan Ziga (Zambia) Phillimon Chipeta (Malaysia) Yusri Che Lah	Pahang FA; Sarawak FA (Selangor) Public Bank FC; Perlis FA; Perlis FA	9

== 2005 ==
The 2005 season of the Malaysia Super League was the second since its inception in 2004. It kicked off on January 29, 2005.

Like Pahang FA before them, Perlis FA won the title easily, leaving the defending champions a huge 10 points behind. Penang FA (Penang E & O) escaped relegation on goal difference, having let in 4 goals less than Public Bank FC. The best club side was Selangor MPPJ.

The top goalscorer award was jointly won by Perlis FA's Zacharia Simukonda and Sabah FA's Júlio César Rodrigues de Souza. Both scored 18 goals. The highest number of goals featured in a match throughout the season was six. Four matches ended with six goals.

The end of the season was marred by turmoil after Public Bank FC announced it would pulled out from the League, having been relegated. The team was eventually banned from all FAM competitions.

=== League table ===
Pos	Team	Pld	W	D	L	GF	GA	GD	Pts	Qualification or relegation
1	Perlis (C)	21	14	3	4	43	19	+24	45	Qualification to AFC Cup group stage
2	Pahang	21	10	5	6	37	29	+8	35	
3	Perak	21	9	3	9	33	25	+8	30	
4	TM Melaka	21	7	7	7	23	28	−5	28	
5	MPPJ	21	8	3	10	29	38	−9	27	
6	Penang	21	8	1	12	27	31	−4	25	
7	Public Bank (R)	21	7	4	10	22	30	−8	25	Relegation to Premier League
8	Sabah (R)	21	6	4	11	25	39	−14	22	Relegation to Premier League

Source: RSSSF
Rules for classification: 1) Points; 2) Goal difference; 3) Number of goals scored.
(C) Champions; (R) Relegated

Super League 2005 winner

Perlis FA
1st title

=== Top scorers ===
Rank	Player	Club	Goals
1	(Brazil) Júlio César Rodrigues	Sabah	18
1	(Zambia) Zachariah Simukonda	Perlis	18
3	(Cameroon) Bernard Tchoutang	Pahang	12
4	(Zimbabwe) Newton Katanha	MPPJ	11
4	(Brazil) José Barreto	Penang	11
4	(Malaysia) Indra Putra Mahayuddin	Pahang	11
4	(Guinea) Mandjou Keita	Perak	11
8	(Liberia) Frank Seator	Perak	10
9	(Russia) Vyacheslav Melnikov	Penang	8
10	(Argentina) Fabricio Franceschi	MPPJ	6
10	(Malaysia) Fadzli Saari	Pahang	6

== 2005–06 ==
The 2005–06 season of the Malaysia Super League was the third since its inception. It kicked off on December 3, 2005. Negeri Sembilan FA emerged champions with one match to spare. They garnered 40 points from 21 matches and won the title despite scoring less goals than all the other teams in the league except Pahang FA, who finished second from bottom. With this title, they finally erased the painful memory of losing the 1996 M-League crown having topped the table for most of that season.

Their nearest rivals were Melaka TMFC with 33 points. Having been in the title contention for most parts of the season, they were the best positioned club side in MSL history after Public Bank FC in 2004.

Perak FA's Keita Mandjou was the season's top scorer with 17 goals. Three matches, including Selangor FA's 6-1 hammering at the hands of Perlis FA, featured seven goals, and these were the season's highest scoring matches.

=== League table ===
Pos	Team	Pld	W	D	L	GF	GA	GD	Pts	Qualification or relegation
1	Negeri Sembilan (C)	21	12	4	5	26	14	+12	40	Qualification to AFC Cup group stage
2	TM Melaka	21	9	6	6	31	46	−15	33	
3	Perak	21	9	3	9	32	29	+3	30	
4	Perlis	21	8	6	7	26	25	+1	30	
5	MPPJ	21	9	2	10	28	27	+1	29	Withdrew from Super League and dissolved.
6	Penang	21	8	4	9	30	31	−1	28	
7	Pahang	21	7	6	8	21	24	−3	27	AFC Cup group stage and relegation play-offs (Note: Pahang qualified for the AFC Cup group stage as the Malaysia FA Cup winners.)
8	Selangor	21	5	3	13	31	46	−15	18	Qualification to relegation play-offs

Source: RSSSF
Rules for classification: 1) Points; 2) Goal difference; 3) Number of goals scored.
(C) Champions
Notes:

2005–06 Super League winner

Negeri Sembilan FA
1st title

=== Top scorers ===
Position	Players	Teams/Clubs	Goals
1	(Guinea) Keita Mandjou	Perak FA	17
2	(Zambia) Phillimon Chepita	Perlis FA	13
3	(Indonesia) Bambang Pamungkas	Selangor FA	11
4	(Argentina) Juan Manuel Arostegui	(Selangor) MPPJ FC	9
4	(Zambia) Chaswe Nsofwa	(Malacca) TM FC	9
6	(Cameroon) Christian Bekamenga	Negeri Sembilan FA	8
7	(Liberia) Josiah Seton	Pahang FA	6
7	(Malaysia) Mohammad Hardi Jaafar	(Malacca) TM FC	6
7	(Zimbabwe) Newton Ben Katanha	(Selangor) MPPJ FC	6
7	(Argentina) Brian Diego Fuentes	Selangor FA	6

=== Relegation playoffs ===
As a result of the Football Association of Malaysia's decision to expand the league to 14 teams, the relegation playoffs were held on June 18, 2006. Six of the league's 14 places were up for grabs in this competition.

Pahang FA and Selangor FA qualified for this competition by virtue of being the lowest placed Super League teams. Top teams from the Malaysia Premier League also qualified for this competition (except for Kedah FA and Malacca FA, who were automatically promoted by virtue of being Premier League Champions).

The first round of matches saw Sarawak FA, Terengganu FA, Selangor FA and DPMM FC (Duli Pengiran Muda Mahkota FC) promoted.

The second round of matches saw Johor FC and Pahang FA promoted.

== 2006–07 ==
The 2006–07 season of the Malaysia Super League is the fourth edition of the competition since its inception. It kicked off on December 16, 2006. The 2007 season is also the first season played with 13 teams (previous versions had only eight). The FAM had originally planned for a 14-team league, but this was ruined with the failure of Selangor MPPJ's failure to register at the start of the season.

Perak FA's Keita Mandjou and DPMM FC (Duli Pengiran Muda Mahkota FC) (Brunei)'s Mohd Shahrazen Said was the season's top scorer with 21 goals each.

=== League table ===
Pos	Team	Pld	W	D	L	GF	GA	GD	Pts	Qualification or relegation
1	Kedah	24	17	4	3	54	21	+33	55	Qualification for the AFC Cup
2	Perak	24	16	5	3	58	22	+36	53	Qualification for the AFC Cup
3	(Brunei) DPMM	24	13	5	6	46	29	+17	44	
4	Terengganu	24	13	5	6	41	29	+12	44	
5	Perlis	24	13	4	7	47	25	+22	43	
6	Johor FC	24	11	6	7	35	26	+9	39	
7	(Malacca) TM	24	10	6	8	34	33	+1	36	Withdrew from Super League and dissolved.
8	Selangor	24	8	4	12	27	36	−9	28	
9	Pahang	24	7	6	11	32	41	−9	27	
10	Penang	24	6	6	12	25	36	−11	24	
11	Negeri Sembilan	24	6	6	12	29	46	−17	24	
12	Sarawak	24	2	4	18	28	65	−37	10	
13	Malacca	24	2	3	19	24	72	−48	9	Relegated to Liga Premier

Super League 2006–07 winner

Kedah FA
1st title

Note: Malacca FA's relegation to 2007–08 Malaysia Premier League season had been revoked because Melaka TMFC pulled out from the Malaysia Super League.

=== Top scorers ===
Position	Players	Teams/Clubs	Goals
1	(Guinea) Keita Mandjou (Brunei) Shah Razen Said	Perak FA (Brunei) DPMM FC	21
3	(Saint Vincent and the Grenadines) Marlon Alex James	Kedah FA	20
4	(Argentina) Walter Ariel Silva	Johor FC	16
5	(Malaysia) Muhamad Khalid Jamlus	Perak FA	15
6	(Malaysia) Mohd Azlan Ismail	Perlis FA	13
6	(Zambia) Phillimon Chepita	Perlis FA	13
8	(Brazil) Sharlei Miranda	Terengganu FA	11
9	(Angola) Frederico Dos Santos	Negeri Sembilan FA	9
9	(Malaysia) Akmal Rizal Ahmad Rakhli	Selangor FA	9

== 2007–08 ==
The 2007–08 season of the Malaysia Super League is the 5th edition since its inception. It was kicked off on November 18, 2007. The 2008 season is also the second season played with 13 teams. The league format was criticize by FIFA panel and the FAM took the action by changing the league format starting on 2009 season.

The 2007–08 season saw Kedah FA clinch their second Super League title with Marlon Alex James became the topscorer with 23 goals.

=== League table ===
Pos	Team	Pld	W	D	L	GF	GA	GD	Pts	Qualification or relegation
1	Kedah	24	18	2	4	55	24	+31	56	Qualification for the AFC Cup
2	Negeri Sembilan	24	14	6	4	48	30	+18	48	
3	Johor FC	24	14	4	6	40	27	+13	46	Qualification for the AFC Cup
4	Selangor	24	14	3	7	46	36	+10	45	
5	Perak	24	13	2	9	46	34	+12	41	
6	Terengganu	24	10	7	7	41	31	+10	37	
7	Perlis	24	10	6	8	36	25	+11	36	
8	Pahang	24	8	6	10	26	31	−5	30	
9	(Malaysia) PDRM	24	7	3	14	30	52	−22	24	
10	(Brunei) DPMM	24	4	10	10	27	34	−7	22	
11	(Malaysia) UPB-MyTeam	24	6	4	14	30	40	−10	22	
12	Penang	24	4	5	15	30	49	−19	17	
13	Sarawak	24	4	2	18	25	67	−42	14	Relegated to Liga Premier

Super League 2007–08 winner

Kedah FA
2nd title

=== Top scorers ===
Position	Players	Teams/Clubs	Goals
1	Marlon Alex James	Kedah	23
2	Carlos Arturo Caceres	Perak	17
3	Frank Seator	Selangor	15
4	Walter Ariel Silva	Johor FC	14
5	Muhamad Khalid Jamlus	Perak	13
6	Phillimon Chipeta	Perlis	13
7	Mohd Safee Mohd Sali	Selangor	11
8	Mohd Zaquan Adha Abdul Radzak	Negeri Sembilan	11
9	Gleisson Freire	Terengganu	10
10	Gustavo Andres Fuentes	Johor FC	10

== 2009 ==
The 2009 season of the Super League Malaysia is the 6th edition since its inception in 2004. This season features 14 teams. DPMM FC (Duli Pengiran Muda Mahkota FC) was excluded from the competition. The competition kicked off on January 3, 2009.

The 2009 season saw Selangor FA clinch their first ever Super League title

=== League table ===
Pos	Team	Pld	W	D	L	GF	GA	GD	Pts	Qualification or relegation
1	Selangor (C)	26	20	3	3	64	21	+43	63	Champion / Qualification to AFC Cup
2	Perlis	26	17	5	4	40	19	+21	56	
3	Kedah	26	16	3	7	45	28	+17	51	
4	Johor FC	26	15	3	8	53	27	+26	48	
5	Terengganu	26	15	2	9	46	29	+17	47	
6	Kelantan	26	14	2	10	49	36	+13	44	
7	Negeri Sembilan	26	11	5	10	44	35	+9	38	
8	PLUS	26	11	5	10	35	26	+9	38	
9	Kuala Muda Naza	26	12	1	13	32	41	−9	37	Withdraw from league and dissolved. (Note: Kuala Muda Naza and UPB-MyTeam withdrew before the start of 2010 season.)
10	Perak	26	9	5	12	27	36	−9	32	
11	UPB-MyTeam	26	9	3	14	28	49	−21	30	Withdraw from league and dissolved.
12	Penang	26	5	4	17	29	55	−26	19	
13	Pahang	26	5	2	19	31	62	−31	17	
14	PDRM (R)	26	0	3	23	19	75	−56	3	Relegated to Liga Premier

Source: Results TM Liga Super and Rec.Sport.Soccer Statistics Foundation
(C) Champions; (R) Relegated
Notes:

Super League 2009 winner

Selangor FA
1st title

=== Top scorers ===
Rank	Player	Club	Goals
1	Mohd Nizaruddin Yusof	Perlis	18
2	Mohd Ashaari Shamsuddin	Terengganu	17
3	Indra Putra Mahayuddin	Kelantan	14
4	Mohd Amri Yahyah	Selangor	13
4	Razali Umar Kandasamy	Perak	13
5	Mohd Safee Mohd Sali	Selangor	12
5	Mohd Khyril Muhymeen Zambri	Kedah	12
5	Mohd Azlan Ismail	Terengganu	12
6	Mohd Zaquan Adha Abdul Radzak	Negeri Sembilan	11
7	Norshahrul Idlan Talaha	UPB-MyTeam	10
7	Abdul Manaf Mamat	Terengganu	10
8	Mohd Fadzli Saari	KL PLUS	9
8	Muhamad Khalid Jamlus	Kelantan	9

8 goals
Player	Club	Goals
Khairul Izuan Abdullah	PDRM	8
Azamuddin Mohd Akil	Pahang	8
Mohd Nurul Azwan Roya	Johor FC	8
Shahurain Abu Samah	Negeri Sembilan	8
Akmal Rizal Ahmad Rakhli	Kuala Muda Naza	8
Badrol Bakhtiar	Kedah	8
Eddy Helmi Abdul Manan	Johor FC	8

7 goals
Player	Club	Goals
Mohd Azrul Ahmad	Kedah	7
Mohd Nor Farhan Muhammad	Kelantan	7

6 goals
Player	Club	Goals
Mohd Syaiful Sabtu	Johor FC	6
R. Surendran	Selangor	6
Mohd Badrul Hisani Abdul Rahman	Pahang	6
Mohd Amirul Hadi Zainal	Selangor	6
Rudie Ramli	Selangor	6
Azizan Baba	Johor FC	6
Mohd Badri Mohd Radzi	Kelantan	6
Ahmad Fakri Saarani	Perlis	6
Zulhissyam Jamaluddin	Kuala Muda Naza	6
Stanley Bernard	UPB-MyTeam	6
Mohd Faizal Abu Bakar	Kedah	6

5 goals
Player	Club	Goals
Mohd Saufi Sa’aidi	Perak	5
Irwan Fadzli Idrus	KL PLUS	5
S. Kunalan	Negeri Sembilan	5
Mohd Rafiuddin Nordin	Pulau Pinang	5
Mohd Irme Mat	Pulau Pinang	5
Mohd Ezaidy Mohd Khadar	Johor FC	5
R. Kartigesu	Pahang	5
K. Rajan	Kuala Muda Naza	5
Muhammad Shukor Adan	Negeri Sembilan	5

4 goals
Player	Club	Goals
Bobby Gonzales	KL PLUS	4
Mohd Farid Idris	Johor FC	4
Rusydee Samsuddin	KL PLUS	4
Azi Shahril Azmi	Perlis	4
Farderin Kadir	Kuala Muda Naza	4
Fazrul Hazli	UPB-MyTeam	4
Mohd Shahrizan Salleh	Pahang	4
Anuar Jusoh	Kuala Muda Naza	4
Idris Abdul Karim	Negeri Sembilan	4
M. Prakash	Pulau Pinang	4

3 goals
Player	Club	Goals
D. Surendran	Selangor	3
Mohd Nasriq Baharom	Selangor	3
Mohd Hamzani Omar	Johor FC	3
Mohd Failee Ghazali	Pulau Pinang	3
V. Jeganathan	Pulau Pinang	3
R. Surendran	Pahang	3
Eddy Gapil	PDRM	3
Zairul Fitree Ishak	Kelantan	3
C. Premnath	Selangor	3
S. Thinagaran	Pulau Pinang	3
Mohd Aidil Zafuan Abdul Radzak	Negeri Sembilan	3
Shahrulnizam Mustapa	Kedah	3
Zairo Anuar Zalani	Terengganu	3
Silvester Sindih	PDRM	3
Muhamad Zamri Chin	UPB-MyTeam	3
Ramzul Zahini	Kelantan	3

2 goal
Player	Club	Goals
Mohd Nazrin Nawi	UPB-MyTeam	2
Mohd Safiq Rahim	KL PLUS	2
Liew Kit Kong	Kuala Muda Naza	2
Norhafiz Zamani Misbah	KL PLUS	2
Mohd Lot Abu Hassan	KL PLUS	2
Shazwan Zainol	Perlis	2
Zuraindey Jumai	Perlis	2
Firdaus Faudzi	Perlis	2
Md Syafuan Riduwan	Johor FC	2
Wan Rohaimi Wan Ismail	Johor FC	2
Mohd Riduwan Maon	Johor FC	2
Mohd Noor Hazrul Mustafa	Perak	2
Shahrizal Saad	Perak	2
Mat Sabree Mat Abu	Kedah	2
Ahmad Fauzi Saari	Kedah	2
Mohd Fadly Baharum	Kedah	2
R Gopinanthan	Pahang	2
Hasmizan Kamarodin	Pahang	2
Fauzi Abdul Majid	PDRM	2
Khairul Zal Azmi	PDRM	2
Mohd Firdaus Azizul	Negeri Sembilan	2

1 goal
Player	Club	Goal
Razman Roslan	Selangor	1
Mohd Asraruddin Putra Omar	Selangor	1
Khairul Anuar Baharom	Selangor	1
Mohammad Hardi Jaafar	Selangor	1
Fitri Shazwan Raduwan	Selangor	1
Muhd Zameer Zainun	Selangor	1
Mohd Fazilidin Khalid	Selangor	1
Mohd Azrul Hafiq Mohd Amran	Selangor	1
Azmi Muslim	UPB-MyTeam	1
Muhamad Kaironnisam Sahabudin Hussain	UPB-MyTeam	1
Depan Sakwati Kandasamy	UPB-MyTeam	1
Bunyamin Umar	UPB-MyTeam	1
K. Soley	Perlis	1
Ridzuan Othman	Perlis	1
Chan Wing Hoong	Perlis	1
Danial Fadzly Abdullah	Perlis	1
Amar Rohidan	Perlis	1
Razlan Oto	Pahang	1
Sumardi Hajalan	Johor FC	1
M. Sivakumar	Johor FC	1
K. Thanaraj	Negeri Sembilan	1
Rahman Zabul	Negeri Sembilan	1
Rezal Zambery Yahya	Negeri Sembilan	1
Mohd Asyraf Al Jappri	Negeri Sembilan	1
Khairul Izzat	Perak	1
Syazwan Roslan	Perak	1
Isma Alif Mohd Salim	Perak	1
Hafiz Abdul Rahman	Perak	1
Wan Hossen Wan Abdul Ghani	Perak	1
Ailim Fahmi	Kelantan	1
Ahmad Azlan Zainal	Kelantan	1
Halimi Fahmi	Kelantan	1
Mohd Nizad Ayub	Kelantan	1
Mohd Rizal Fahmi	Kelantan	1
Abdul Aziz Ismail	KL PLUS	1
Norfahmi Hazrin	KL PLUS	1
S. Sumindran	KL PLUS	1
Mohd Hairul Nizam Hanif	KL PLUS	1
Rusydee Samsuddin	KL PLUS	1
Amir Shahreen Mubin	KL PLUS	1
Nur Adli Effendi	KL PLUS	1
Mohd Idzwan Salim	Pulau Pinang	1
M. Venod	Pulau Pinang	1
Mohd Nor Azlan	Pulau Pinang	1
Manzoor Azwira Wahid	Kuala Muda Naza	1
Shazlan Alias	Terengganu	1
Ahmad Nordin Alias	Terengganu	1
Mohd Saufie Hamid	Terengganu	1
Ismail Faruqi	Terengganu	1
Mohd Hafiz Kamal	Pahang	1
Mohd Azrul Azman	PDRM	1
Wan Zaim Wan Azizan	Kedah	1
Mohd Afif Amiruddin	Kedah	1
Mohd Farizal Rozali	Kedah	1

Own goal
Player	Club	Own goal
B. Rajnikandh	Kuala Muda Naza	l. Selangor
M. Sivakumar	Johor FC	l. Selangor
Syafuan Ridwan	Johor FC	l. Selangor
Azmi Muslim	UPB-MyTeam	l. Kuala Muda Naza
Talfizam Taufik	PDRM	l. Selangor
Rizal Nayan	PDRM	l. Kelantan
Che Ku Ahmad Rusydi	Terengganu	l. Kelantan
Victor Andrag	Kedah	l. Kuala Muda Naza

== 2010 ==
The 2010 Super League Malaysia was the 7th season of the highest Malaysian football league since its inception in 2004. Fourteen teams participated in the league, eleven state teams and three club teams, with Selangor FA as the defending champions. The season began on 9 January 2010 and ended on 3 August 2010. Selangor defended their title.

The opening match of the season between Negeri Sembilan FA and Selangor also doubled up as the Malaysia Charity Shield. Selangor FA won 2–1.

=== League table ===
Pos	Team	Pld	W	D	L	GF	GA	GD	Pts	Qualification or relegation
1	Selangor	26	20	3	3	62	23	+39	63	
2	Kelantan	26	17	8	1	50	14	+36	59	
3	Terengganu	26	15	5	6	51	27	+24	50	
4	Johor FC	26	13	4	9	44	29	+15	43	
5	Kedah	26	10	8	8	34	23	+11	38	
6	Negeri Sembilan	26	11	5	10	40	31	+9	38	
7	T–Team	26	10	8	8	33	26	+7	38	
8	Pahang	26	10	3	13	31	50	−19	33	
9	Kuala Lumpur	26	8	8	10	20	29	−9	32	
10	PLUS	26	8	6	12	29	29	0	30	Withdrawal from Liga Super (Note: PLUS withdrew from Liga Super before the start of 2011 season.)
11	Perak	26	8	6	12	25	30	−5	30	
12	Perlis	26	8	5	13	32	35	−3	29	
13	Johor	26	5	1	20	18	66	−48	16	Relegation to 2011 Liga Premier
14	Penang	26	2	4	20	10	67	−57	10	Relegation to 2011 Liga Premier

Source: Results TM Liga Super
Rules for classification: 1) points; 2) goal difference; 3) number of goals scored.
Notes:

Super League 2010 winner

Selangor FA
2nd title

=== Top scorers ===
Including matches played on n/a; Source: FIFA: Liga Super Scorers

Rank	Scorer	Club	Goals
1	Mohd Ashaari Shamsuddin	Terengganu	18
2	Mohd Safee Mohd Sali	Selangor	12
3	Mohd Amirul Hadi Zainal	Selangor	12
4	Norshahrul Idlan Talaha	Kelantan	11
5	Azlan Ismail	Kedah	10
6	Mohd Azamuddin Md Akil	Pahang	10
7	Abdul Manaf Mamat	Terengganu	9
8	R. Surendran	Selangor	8
9	Badhri Radzi	Kelantan	8
10	Mohd Nurul Azwan Roya	Johor FC	7

== 2011 ==
The 2011 Malaysia Super League (also known as Astro Liga Super Malaysia 2011 in Malay and the Astro Super League Malaysia due to the sponsorship from Astro) is the 8th season of the highest Malaysian football league since its inception in 2004. Fourteen teams participated in the league, eleven state teams and three club teams, with Selangor FA as the defending champions. The season began on 29 January 2011 and will conclude on 30 July 2011.

=== League table ===
Pos	Team	Pld	W	D	L	GF	GA	GD	Pts	Qualification or relegation
1	Kelantan (C)	26	17	5	4	52	21	+31	56	Qualification to AFC Cup group stage (Note: Terengganu qualified for the AFC Cup group stage by winning the 2011 Malaysia FA Cup. They automatically advanced to the group stage due to restructuring of the East Zone playoffs.)
2	Terengganu	26	16	5	5	54	26	+28	53	Qualification to AFC Cup group stage
3	Selangor	26	16	4	6	42	24	+18	52	
4	Kedah	26	13	6	7	25	20	+5	45	
5	Harimau Muda A	26	12	7	7	38	28	+10	43	
6	Perak	26	10	10	6	31	24	+7	40	
7	Johor FC	26	8	10	8	26	28	−2	34	
8	Negeri Sembilan	26	8	8	10	29	32	−3	32	
9	T–Team	26	9	4	13	35	40	−5	31	
10	Sabah	26	7	7	12	24	32	−8	28	
11	Felda United	26	7	7	12	22	34	−12	28	
12	Kuala Lumpur	26	6	8	12	23	34	−11	26	
13	Pahang (R)	26	5	7	14	19	36	−17	22	Relegation to Premier League
14	Perlis (R)	26	2	4	20	20	61	−41	10	Relegation to Premier League

Updated to match(es) played on unknown. Source: FIFA
Rules for classification: 1) Points; 2) Goal difference; 3) Number of goals scored.
(C) Champions; (R) Relegated

=== Top scorers ===
Rank	Player	Club	Goals
1	Abdul Hadi Yahya	Terengganu	20
2	Norshahrul Idlan Talaha	Kelantan	19
3	Abdul Manaf Mamat	Terengganu	13
4	Indra Putra Mahayuddin	T–Team	11
5	Mohd Badhri Mohd Radzi	Kelantan	10
5	Mohd Ashaari Shamsuddin	Terengganu	10
6	Akmal Rizal Ahmad Rakhli	Perak	9
6	Baddrol Bakhtiar	Kedah	9
6	Izzaq Faris Ramlan	Harimau Muda A	9
7	Ahmad Hazwan Bakri	Kuala Lumpur	7
7	Mohd Fandi Othman	Harimau Muda A	7
7	Mohd Firdaus Azizul	Negeri Sembilan	7
7	Mohd Safiq Rahim	Selangor	7

== 2012 ==
The 2012 Malaysia Super League (also known as Astro Liga Super Malaysia 2012 in Malay and the Astro Super League Malaysia due to the sponsorship from Astro) is the 9th season of the highest Malaysian football league since its inception in 2004. Fourteen teams participated in the league. The season began on 10 January 2012 and will conclude on 14 July 2012.

=== League table ===
Pos	Team	Pld	W	D	L	GF	GA	GD	Pts	Qualification or relegation
1	Kelantan (C, Q)	26	18	6	2	53	18	+35	60	2013 AFC Cup group stage
2	LionsXII (Note: LionsXII are not eligible for any AFC competition spots)	26	15	5	6	48	23	+25	50	
3	Selangor (Q)	26	12	7	7	40	26	+14	43	2013 AFC Cup group stage (Note: Qualified as the next highest-placed local team behind Liga Super and 2012 Piala FA winners Kelantan.)
4	Perak	26	13	3	10	40	43	−3	42	
5	Terengganu	26	11	8	7	41	33	+8	41	
6	Negeri Sembilan	26	10	7	9	41	38	+3	37	
7	PKNS	26	8	11	7	35	35	0	35	
8	T-Team	26	10	5	11	35	36	−1	35	
9	Johor FC	26	10	5	11	29	31	−2	35	
10	Felda United	26	11	2	13	25	31	−6	35	
11	Sarawak (R)	26	8	6	12	28	32	−4	30	Relegation play-offs
12	Kedah (R)	26	7	7	12	27	38	−11	28	Relegation play-offs
13	Sabah (R)	26	7	7	12	33	52	−19	28	Relegation play-offs
14	Kuala Lumpur (R)	26	0	5	21	14	53	−39	5	Relegation to 2013 Liga Premier

Source: RSSSF
Rules for classification: 1) points; 2) goal difference; 3) number of goals scored
(C) Champions; (Q) Qualified for the phase indicated; (R) Relegated

=== Top scorers ===
Rank	Player	Club	Goals
1	Jean-Emmanuel Effa Owona	Negeri Sembilan	15
2	Francis Doe Forkey	Terengganu	14
3	Michal Kubala	Perak	13
4	Boško Balaban	Selangor	12
5	Shahril Ishak	LionsXII	10
5	Ahmad Shakir Mohd Ali	Negeri Sembilan	10
5	Mohd Khyril Muhymeen Zambri	Kedah	10
8	Mohammed Ghaddar	Kelantan	9
8	Zairo Anuar Zalani	T-Team	9
8	Mohd Faiz Subri	T-Team	9
11	Shahdan Sulaiman	LionsXII	8
11	Mohd Badri Mohd Radzi	Kelantan	8

== 2013 ==
The 2013 Malaysia Super League (also known as Astro Liga Super Malaysia 2013 in Malay and the Astro Super League Malaysia due to the sponsorship from Astro) is the 10th season of the highest Malaysian football league since its inception in 2004. Twelve teams participated in the league. The season began on 8 January 2013 and will conclude on 6 July 2013.

=== League table ===
Pos	Team	Pld	W	D	L	GF	GA	GD	Pts	Qualification or relegation
1	LionsXII (Note: LionsXII was not eligible for any AFC competition spots as they were a foreign side.)	22	12	7	3	32	15	+17	43	
2	Selangor	22	10	10	2	31	17	+14	40	2014 AFC Cup group stage
3	Johor Darul Takzim	22	11	7	4	32	26	+6	40	
4	Kelantan	22	10	6	6	32	20	+12	36	2014 AFC Cup group stage (Note: Qualified as 2013 Piala FA winners)
5	Pahang	22	10	5	7	36	32	+4	35	
6	ATM	22	10	4	8	35	25	+10	34	
7	Perak	22	8	5	9	23	27	−4	29	
8	PKNS	22	8	4	10	34	34	0	28	
9	Terengganu	22	7	6	9	25	31	−6	27	
10	T-Team	22	5	4	13	19	33	−14	19	
11	Felda United	22	4	7	11	13	35	−22	19	Relegation to 2014 Liga Premier
12	Negeri Sembilan	22	1	7	14	11	28	−17	10	Relegation to 2014 Liga Premier

Source: RSSSF
Rules for classification: 1) points; 2) goal difference; 3) number of goals scored

=== Top scorers ===
As of 6 July 2013

Rank	Player	Club	Goals
1	(Saint Vincent and the Grenadines) Marlon Alex James	ATM	16
2	(Liberia) Patrick Ronaldinho Wleh	PKNS	14
3	(Liberia) Francis Forkey Doe	Selangor	10
4	(Brazil) Paulo Rangel	Perak	9
5	(Singapore) Shahril Ishak	LionsXII	8
5	(Malaysia) Mohd Fauzi Roslan	Pahang	8
5	(Malaysia) Mohd Amri Yahyah	Selangor	8
8	(Malaysia) Norshahrul Idlan Talaha	Johor Darul Takzim	7
9	(Spain) Daniel Güiza	Johor Darul Takzim	6
9	(Malaysia) Indra Putra Mahayuddin	Kelantan	6
9	(Malaysia) Mohd Nor Farhan Muhammad	Kelantan	6
9	(Malaysia) Mohd Badhri Mohd Radzi	Kelantan	6
9	(Cameroon) Jean-Emmanuel Effa Owona	Terengganu	6

== 2014 ==
The 2014 Malaysia Super League (also known as Astro Liga Super Malaysia 2014 in Malay and the Astro Super League Malaysia due to the sponsorship from Astro) is the 11th season of the highest Malaysian football league since its inception in 2004. Twelve teams participated in the league. The season began on 17 January 2014 and will conclude on 25 June 2014.

=== League table ===
Pos	Team	Pld	W	D	L	GF	GA	GD	Pts	Qualification or relegation
1	Johor Darul Ta'zim	22	13	5	4	39	22	+17	44	2015 AFC Champions League qualifying play-off
2	Selangor	22	12	5	5	28	19	+9	41	
3	Pahang	22	11	4	7	36	30	+6	37	2015 AFC Cup group stage (Note: Qualified as 2014 Piala FA winners)
4	Terengganu	22	10	6	6	38	28	+10	36	
5	Sime Darby	22	9	4	9	32	32	0	31	
6	Kelantan	22	10	1	11	26	29	−3	31	
7	Sarawak	22	9	3	10	26	31	−5	30	
8	LionsXII (Note: LionsXII are not eligible for any AFC competition spots)	22	8	4	10	26	27	−1	28	
9	Perak	22	8	2	12	22	27	−5	26	
10	ATM	22	6	6	10	29	34	−5	24	
11	T–Team	22	6	6	10	21	28	−7	24	Relegation to 2015 Liga Premier
12	PKNS	22	4	6	12	24	40	−16	18	Relegation to 2015 Liga Premier

Source: RSSSF, FAM Official Site, Astro Arena
Rules for classification: 1) points; 2) goal difference; 3) number of goals scored

=== Top scorers ===
As of 25 June 2014

Rank	Player	Club	Goals
1	(Brazil) Paulo Rangel	Selangor	16
2	(Argentina) Luciano Figueroa	Johor Darul Ta'zim	11
3	(Argentina) Juan Arostegui	ATM	9
3	(Argentina) Matías Conti	Pahang	9
5	(Argentina) Jorge Pereyra Díaz	Johor Darul Ta'zim	8
6	(Singapore) Khairul Amri	LionsXII	7
6	(Liberia) Patrick Wleh	PKNS	7
6	(Malaysia) Nor Farhan Muhammad	Terengganu	7
9	(Argentina) Bruno Martelotto	ATM	6
9	(Nigeria) Dickson Nwakaeme	Pahang	6
9	(Malaysia) S. Chanturu	Sarawak	6
12	(Liberia) Francis Doe	Kelantan	5
12	(Nigeria) Abdulafees Abdulsalam	Perak	5
12	(Montenegro) Milan Purović	Perak	5
12	(Uzbekistan) Dilshod Sharofetdinov	Sime Darby	5
12	(Indonesia) Patrich Wanggai	T-Team	5

== 2015 ==
The 2015 Malaysia Super League is the 12th season of the highest Malaysian football league since its inception in 2004. Twelve teams participated in the league. The season began on 31 January 2015 and concluded on 22 August 2015.

=== League table ===
Pos	Team	Pld	W	D	L	GF	GA	GD	Pts	Qualification or relegation
1	Johor Darul Ta'zim (C)	22	14	4	4	36	18	+18	46	Qualification to AFC Champions League qualifying preliminary round 2
2	Selangor	22	11	6	5	43	28	+15	39	Qualification to AFC Cup group stage (Note: Since Lions XII, who won the 2015 Piala FA, are a side managed by the Football Association of Singapore and thus ineligible to represent Malaysia in continental competition, the 2015 Liga Super runners-up will be chosen to represent Malaysia in the AFC Cup.)
3	Pahang	22	13	5	4	43	29	+14	38 (Note: Pahang was docked 6 points due to involvement in the delay in the process of solving the problem of salary and compensation by the former imports season 2013, Mohamed Borji.)	
4	Terengganu	22	12	2	8	40	33	+7	38	
5	Felda United	22	10	6	6	36	26	+10	36	
6	PDRM	22	11	2	9	42	39	+3	35	
7	LionsXII (Note: LionsXII are not eligible for any AFC competition spots)	22	9	6	7	36	32	+4	33	End of MOU saw club dissolved at the end of the season.
8	Perak	22	8	4	10	32	33	−1	28	
9	Kelantan	22	8	4	10	34	38	−4	28	
10	Sarawak	22	4	7	11	28	40	−12	19	
11	ATM (R)	22	2	5	15	21	47	−26	11	Qualification to the Relegation play-off
12	Sime Darby (R)	22	1	7	14	20	48	−28	10	Relegation to Liga Premier

Source: FAM Official Site, Astro Arena
Rules for classification: 1) points; 2) goal difference; 3) number of goals scored
(C) Champions; (R) Relegated

=== Top scorers ===
Rank	Player	Club	Goals
1	(Mali) Dramane Traore	PDRM	20
2	(Liberia) Patrick Ronaldinho Wleh	PKNS	16
3	(Argentina) Matias Conti	Pahang	12
3	(Argentina) Luciano Figueroa	Johor Darul Ta'zim	12
4	(Maldives) Ali Ashfaq	PDRM	10
4	(Republic of Ireland) Billy Mehmet	Sarawak	10
6	(Brazil) Chad Souza	Perak	9
6	(South Korea) Namkung Woong	Perak	9
6	(Nigeria) Dickson Nwakaeme	Pahang	9
6	(Canada) Issey Nakajima-Farran	Terengganu	9
10	(Brazil) Paulo Rangel	Terengganu	8
10	(Singapore) Faris Ramli	LionsXII	8
10	(Malaysia) Afiq Azmi	Selangor	8
10	(Brazil) Guilherme de Paula	Selangor	8

== 2016 ==
The 2016 Malaysia Super League is the 13th season of the highest Malaysian football league since its inception in 2004. Twelve teams participated in the league. The season began on 13 February 2016 and concluded on 22 October 2016.

=== League table ===
Pos	Team	Pld	W	D	L	GF	GA	GD	Pts	Qualification or relegation
1	Johor Darul Ta'zim (C)	22	18	4	0	56	14	+42	58	Qualification to AFC Champions League preliminary round 2 (Note: Also qualification to AFC Cup group stage if failed to qualify for the AFC Champions League group stage.)
2	Felda United	22	13	4	5	47	27	+20	43	Qualification to AFC Cup group stage (Note: Since the winners of 2016 Piala FA, Johor Darul Ta'zim, currently qualify for AFC Champions League based on their league position, the spot awarded to the Piala FA winner (AFC Cup group stage) would be passed to the next best team in the table (in this case, the second-placed team).)
3	Kedah	22	11	7	4	30	26	+4	37 (Note: Kedah Football Association (Kedah FA) has been found guilty of putting the suspended player during the match against Pahang on August 3, 2016. Therefore, the Football Association of Malaysia (FAM) has been awarded 3 points for Pahang and Kedah sentenced deducted 3 points for the incident.)	
4	Kelantan	22	7	8	7	37	33	+4	29	
5	Selangor	22	7	7	8	28	27	+1	28	
6	Perak	22	7	7	8	29	30	−1	28	
7	T–Team	22	7	6	9	30	34	−4	27	
8	Sarawak	22	6	6	10	32	40	−8	24	
9	Pahang	22	5	6	11	22	41	−19	24 (Note: Pahang has been awarded 3 points free from the Football Association of Malaysia (FAM) after offenses committed by the Football Association of Kedah (Kedah FA) putting the suspended player during the match against Pahang on August 3, 2016.)	
10	Penang	22	5	7	10	32	37	−5	22	
11	PDRM (R)	22	5	6	11	21	32	−11	21	Relegation to Liga Premier
12	Terengganu (R)	22	5	4	13	21	44	−23	19	Relegation to Liga Premier

Source: SPMB Football Association of Malaysia, Football Malaysia LLP
Rules for classification: 1) Points; 2) Goal difference; 3) Number of goals scored; 3) Number of goals against.
(C) Champions; (R) Relegated

=== Top scorers ===
As of matches played on 22 October 2016

Rank	Player	Club	Goals
1	(Argentina) Jorge Pereyra Díaz	Johor Darul Ta'zim	18
2	(Argentina) Juan Martín Lucero	Johor Darul Ta'zim	16
3	(Liberia) Francis Forkey Doe	Felda United	15
4	(North Macedonia) Baže Ilijoski	Kelantan	14
5	(Brazil) Patrick Cruz	T–Team	10
6	(Brazil) Elias Fernandes	Perak	9
6	(Australia) Ndumba Makeche	Sarawak	9
6	(Liberia) Patrick Wleh	Selangor	9
7	(Liberia) Zah Rahan Krangar	Felda United	8
7	(Uzbekistan) Lutfulla Turaev	Felda United	8
7	(Brazil) Gilmar	Sarawak	8

== 2017 ==
The 2017 Malaysia Super League is the 14th season of the highest Malaysian football league since its inception in 2004. Twelve teams participated in the league. The season began on 20 January 2017 and concluded on 28 October 2017.

=== League table ===
Pos	Team	Pld	W	D	L	GF	GA	GD	Pts	Qualification or relegation
1	Johor Darul Ta'zim (C)	22	15	4	3	50	19	+31	49	Qualification to Champions League preliminary round 2 or AFC Cup group stage
2	Pahang (Note: Pahang withdraw from AFC competition.)	22	12	4	6	44	26	+18	40	
3	Felda United (Note: Felda United were relegated because they failed to renew their licence) (R)	22	11	6	5	40	26	+14	39	Relegation to Premier League
4	Kedah (Note: Kedah as 2017 Malaysia FA Cup winners not eligible for AFC competition spots as they failed granted AFC club license.)	22	9	8	5	45	33	+12	35	
5	Perak	22	9	7	6	30	31	−1	34	
6	Selangor	22	9	6	7	32	28	+4	33	
7	PKNS	22	6	7	9	33	38	−5	25	
8	Melaka United	22	6	6	10	33	46	−13	24	
9	T–Team (R)	22	7	5	10	30	45	−15	23 (Note: Kelantan and T–Team was sentenced to a six-point deduction immediately on offense failed to complete the registration process Malaysian League (M-League) 2017. Later, upon careful consideration of the aforementioned appeals, Football Malaysia have decided to lift the transfer ban and reduce the deduction of 6 points to 3 points for T-Team.)	Relegation to Premier League
10	Kelantan	22	7	4	11	31	39	−8	22 (Note: Kelantan and T–Team was sentenced to a six-point deduction immediately on offense failed to complete the registration process Malaysian League (M-League) 2017. Later, upon careful consideration of the aforementioned appeals, Football Malaysia have decided to only reduce the deduction of 6 points to 3 points for Kelantan.)	
11	Sarawak (R)	22	5	6	11	24	34	−10	21	Relegation to Premier League
12	Penang (R)	22	3	3	16	16	43	−27	12	Relegation to Premier League

Source: FAM, FMLLP
Rules for classification: 1) Points; 2) Goal difference; 3) Number of goals scored.
(C) Champions; (R) Relegated

=== Top scorers ===
As of 28 October 2017.

Rank	Player	Club	Goals
1	(Lebanon) Mohammed Ghaddar	Johor Darul Ta'zim (5), Kelantan (18)	23
2	(Brazil) Matheus Alves	Pahang	18
3	(Denmark) Ken Ilsø	Kedah	15
4	(Brazil) Thiago Augusto	Felda United	14
5	(Argentina) Gonzalo Cabrera	Johor Darul Ta'zim	11
6	(Malaysia) Safiq Rahim	Johor Darul Ta'zim	9
6	(Malaysia) Baddrol Bakhtiar	Kedah	9
6	(Croatia) Marko Šimić	Melaka United	9
6	(Croatia) Mateo Roskam	Sarawak	9
10	(Brazil) Sandro	Kedah	8
10	(Liberia) Patrick Wleh	PKNS	8
10	(Liberia) Francis Doe	Selangor	8
13	(Argentina) Gabriel Guerra	Johor Darul Ta'zim	7
14	(The Gambia) Mohamadou Sumareh	Pahang	6
14	(Argentina) Lucas Cano	Felda United	6
16	(Nigeria) Ifedayo Olusegun	Felda United	5
16	(South Korea) Jeon Woo-young	Melaka United	5
16	(Palestine) Yashir Pinto	Perak	5
16	(Argentina) Lucas Espindola	PKNS	5
16	(Philippines) Mark Hartmann	Penang (2), Sarawak (3)	5
16	(Brazil) Juliano Mineiro	Selangor	5
16	(Spain) Rufino Segovia	Selangor	5
16	(Uzbekistan) Farhod Tadjiyev	T–Team	5
16	(Malaysia) Nor Hakim Hassan	T–Team	5

== 2018 ==
The 2018 Malaysia Super League is the 15th season of the highest Malaysian football league since its inception in 2004. Twelve teams participated in the league. The season began on 3 February 2018 and concluded on 29 July 2018.

=== League table ===
Pos	Team	Pld	W	D	L	GF	GA	GD	Pts	Qualification or relegation
1	Johor Darul Ta'zim (C)	22	19	2	1	47	9	+38	59	Qualification for the AFC Champions League group stage
2	Perak	22	10	6	6	35	27	+8	36	Qualification for the AFC Champions League second preliminary round
3	PKNS	22	10	5	7	37	29	+8	35	
4	Pahang	22	9	7	6	35	21	+14	34	
5	Terengganu	22	10	4	8	32	31	+1	34	
6	Kedah	22	9	5	8	37	36	+1	32	
7	Melaka United	22	9	4	9	33	38	−5	31	
8	Selangor	22	7	6	9	35	39	−4	27	
9	PKNP	22	7	4	11	25	31	−6	25	
10	Kuala Lumpur	22	7	3	12	39	51	−12	24	
11	Kelantan (R)	22	5	3	14	20	43	−23	18	Relegation to the Premier League
12	Negeri Sembilan (R)	22	4	3	15	27	47	−20	15	Relegation to the Premier League

Source: FAM, FMLLP
Rules for classification: 1) Points; 2) Goal difference; 3) Number of goals scored.
(C) Champions; (R) Relegated

=== Top scorers ===
As of matches played on 29 July 2018.

Players sorted first by goals, then by last name.

Rank	Player	Club	Goals
1	(Spain) Rufino Segovia	Selangor	19
2	(Ivory Coast) Kipré Tchétché	Terengganu	14
3	(Brazil) Guilherme de Paula	Kuala Lumpur	13
4	(Belarus) Yahor Zubovich	Melaka United	12
5	(Brazil) Gilmar	Perak	11
6	(Argentina) Gonzalo Cabrera	Johor Darul Ta'zim	9
7	(Brazil) Flávio Júnior	Negeri Sembilan	8
7	(Nigeria) Ifedayo Olusegun	Melaka United	8
7	(Argentina) Nicolás Vélez	Negeri Sembilan	8
7	(Brazil) Sandro	Kedah	8

== 2019 ==
The 2019 Malaysia Super League is the 16th season of the highest Malaysian football league since its inception in 2004. Twelve teams participated in the league. The season began on 1 February 2019 and concluded on 21 July 2019.

=== League table ===
Pos	Team	Pld	W	D	L	GF	GA	GD	Pts	Qualification or relegation
1	Johor Darul Ta'zim (C)	22	16	5	1	49	19	+30	53	Qualification for AFC Champions League group stage
2	Pahang	22	12	7	3	37	21	+16	43	
3	Selangor	22	10	7	5	41	35	+6	37	
4	Kedah (Note: Kedah FA qualified for the AFC Champions League preliminary round 2 as Malaysia FA Cup winners.)	22	9	7	6	37	29	+8	34	Qualification for AFC Champions League preliminary round 2
5	Perak	22	8	9	5	36	31	+5	33	
6	Melaka United	22	9	6	7	34	30	+4	33	
7	Terengganu	22	7	9	6	35	37	−2	30	
8	Petaling Jaya City	22	8	2	12	22	29	−7	26	
9	PKNS (Note: PKNS F.C. relegated after withdrawing license to complete for the 2020 Malaysia Premier League season as they become feeder club to Selangor FA.) (R)	22	5	6	11	37	38	−1	21	Relegation to Malaysia Premier League
10	Felda United	22	4	7	11	27	43	−16	19	
11	PKNP (R)	22	3	7	12	22	40	−18	16	Relegation to Malaysia Premier League
12	Kuala Lumpur (R)	22	4	2	16	24	49	−25	14	Relegation to Malaysia Premier League

Source: MFL
Rules for classification: 1) Points; 2) Goal difference; 3) Number of goals scored.
(C) Champions; (R) Relegated

=== Top scorers ===
As of matches played on 21 July 2019.

Players sorted first by goals, then by last name.

Rank	Player	Club	Goals
1	(Liberia) Kpah Sherman	PKNS	14
2	(Brazil) Diogo	Johor Darul Ta'zim	12
2	(Nigeria) Ifedayo Olusegun	Selangor	12
4	(Iraq) Gonzalo Cabrera	Johor Darul Ta'zim	11
5	(Philippines) Patrick Reichelt	Melaka United	10
6	(Brazil) Giancarlo	Petaling Jaya/PKNP	9
6	(Spain) Fernando Rodriguez	Kedah	9
8	(Brazil) Guilherme de Paula	Kuala Lumpur	8
8	(Argentina) Leandro Velázquez	Johor Darul Ta'zim	8
8	(Malaysia) Safawi Rasid	Johor Darul Ta'zim	8
8	(Uzbekistan) Sanjar Shaakhmedov	Terengganu	8

== 2020 ==
The 2020 Malaysia Super League is the 17th season of the highest Malaysian football league since its inception in 2004. Twelve teams participated in the league. The season began on 28 February 2020 and concluded on 31 October 2020.

On 13 March 2020, it was announced that the league would be suspended indefinitely, due to the ongoing COVID-19 pandemic. On 1 May, it was announced that the league would resume in September dependent on the situation at the time. Due to time constraints, the home-and-away format has been scrapped. Teams played each other only once, meaning that the champion of the Super League was decided after eleven rounds of matches.

=== League table ===
Pos	Team	Pld	W	D	L	GF	GA	GD	Pts	Qualification or relegation
1	Johor Darul Ta'zim (C, Q)	11	9	2	0	33	8	+25	29	Qualification for AFC Champions League group stage
2	Kedah (Q)	11	7	1	3	20	13	+7	22	Qualification for AFC Cup group stage
3	Terengganu (Q)	11	6	1	4	24	14	+10	19	Qualification for AFC Cup group stage
4	Perak	11	5	3	3	21	19	+2	18	
5	Selangor	11	4	5	2	26	19	+7	17	
6	UiTM	11	5	2	4	17	15	+2	17	
7	Petaling Jaya City	11	3	5	3	17	16	+1	14	
8	Pahang	11	4	2	5	18	18	0	14	
9	Melaka United	11	4	2	5	13	16	−3	11 (Note: Melaka have been docked three points following the decision from FAM.)	
10	Sabah	11	2	3	6	12	24	−12	9	
11	Felda United (R)	11	1	4	6	12	27	−15	7	Relegation to Malaysia Premier League
12	PDRM (R)	11	0	2	9	5	29	−24	−1 (Note: PDRM have been docked three points following the decision from FAM.)	Relegation to Malaysia Premier League

Source: Malaysian Football League
Rules for classification: 1) Points; 2) Goal difference; 3) Number of goals scored.
(C) Champions; (Q) Qualified for the phase indicated; (R) Relegated

=== Top scorers ===
Rank	Player	Club	Goals
1	(Nigeria) Ifedayo Olusegun	Selangor	12
2	(Malaysia) Shahrel Fikri	Perak	10
3	(Mauritania) Dominique Da Sylva	Terengganu	9
4	(Malaysia) Safawi Rasid	Johor Darul Ta'zim	7
4	(Ivory Coast) Kipré Tchétché	Kedah	7
4	(Iraq) Gonzalo Cabrera	Johor Darul Ta'zim	7
5	(Brazil) Gustavo Almeida dos Santos	UiTM	6
5	(Brazil) Ivan Carlos	Pahang	6
5	(England) Lee Tuck	Terengganu	6
5	(Liberia) Kpah Sherman	Kedah	6
6	(Nigeria) Uche Agba	Melaka United	5
6	(Uzbekistan) Sanjar Shaakhmedov	Terengganu	5

== See also ==
- Malaysia Super League
- Malaysia Super League seasons

== 2021 ==
The 2021 Malaysia Super League is the 18th season of the highest Malaysian football league since its inception in 2004. Twelve teams participated in the league. The season began on 5 March 2021 and concluded on 12 September 2021.

=== League table ===
Pos	Team	Pld	W	D	L	GF	GA	GD	Pts	Qualification or relegation
1	Johor Darul Ta'zim (C)	22	18	3	1	50	9	+41	57	Qualification for AFC Champions League group stage
2	Kedah Darul Aman	22	13	4	5	44	28	+16	43	Qualification for AFC Cup group stage
3	Penang	22	12	5	5	37	30	+7	41	
4	Terengganu	22	11	5	6	33	20	+13	38	
5	Selangor	22	10	6	6	45	30	+15	36	
6	Kuala Lumpur City	22	8	9	5	27	20	+7	33 (Note: KL City qualified to 2022 AFC Cup as winner of 2021 Malaysia Cup)	Qualification for AFC Cup group stage
7	Petaling Jaya City	22	6	6	10	16	28	−12	24	
8	Melaka United	22	5	9	8	25	31	−6	21 (Note: Melaka have been docked three points based on the following of the decision from FAM (Football Association of Malaysia).)	
9	Sabah	22	4	7	11	21	38	−17	19	
10	Sri Pahang	22	4	6	12	23	37	−14	18	
11	Perak (R)	22	4	4	14	20	45	−25	16	Relegation to Malaysia Premier League
12	UiTM (R)	22	3	4	15	16	41	−25	13	Relegation to Malaysia Premier League

Source: Malaysian Football League
Rules for classification: 1) Points; 2) Goal difference; 3) Number of goals scored.
(C) Champions; (R) Relegated

=== Top scorers ===
As of matches played 12 September 2021

Rank	Player	Club	Goals
1	(Bahrain) Ifedayo Olusegun	Selangor	26
2	(Brazil) Bergson da Silva	Johor Darul Ta'zim	23
3	(Liberia) Kpah Sherman	Kedah Darul Aman	13
4	(Brazil) Casagrande	Penang	12
5	(Ivory Coast) Kipré Tchétché	Kedah Darul Aman	10
5	(Brazil) Paulo Josué	Kuala Lumpur City	10
7	(Brazil) David da Silva	Terengganu	7
7	(Malaysia) Baddrol Bakhtiar	Kedah Darul Aman	7
7	(Ghana) Nana Poku	UiTM/Perak	7
10	(Switzerland) Oliver Buff	Selangor	6
10	(Tajikistan) Sheriddin Boboev	Penang	6

== 2022 ==
The 2022 Malaysia Super League is the 19th season of the highest Malaysian football league since its inception in 2004. Twelve teams participated in the league. The season began on 4 March 2022 and concluded on 15 October 2022.

=== League table ===
Pos	Team	Pld	W	D	L	GF	GA	GD	Pts	Qualification or relegation
1	Johor Darul Ta'zim	22	17	5	0	61	12	+49	56	Qualification for AFC Champions League group stage
2	Terengganu	22	14	2	6	39	20	+19	44	Qualification for AFC Cup group stage
3	Sabah	22	13	3	6	36	26	+10	42	Qualification for AFC Cup group stage
4	Negeri Sembilan	22	12	5	5	33	26	+7	41	
5	Selangor	22	8	6	8	39	33	+6	30	
6	Kuala Lumpur City	22	8	5	9	30	31	−1	29	
7	Sri Pahang	22	8	4	10	33	31	+2	28	
8	Kedah Darul Aman	22	8	3	11	32	41	−9	27	
9	Petaling Jaya City (D, R)	22	6	8	8	22	30	−8	26	Withdrawn from Liga Super and dissolved. (Note: Petaling Jaya City withdrew from Liga Super before the start of 2023 season.)
10	Melaka United (D, R)	22	4	6	12	22	43	−21	18 (Note: MFL officially snubs Melaka United and Sarawak United club licensing approval, as both clubs have problem with overdue payments of staffs or players. This decision prevented both from playing in 2023 Malaysian Super League. As of November 2nd, there are still no appeal from both clubs to continue the league structure by playing in M5 League.)	Ejected from Malaysian Super League and dissolved.
11	Sarawak United (D, R)	22	5	2	15	19	50	−31	17	Ejected from Malaysian Super League and relegated to 2023 Malaysia M3 League
12	Penang	22	2	5	15	22	45	−23	11	

Updated to match(es) played on unknown. Source: MFL
Rules for classification: 1) Points; 2) Goal difference; 3) Number of goals scored.
(D) Disqualified; (R) Relegated

=== Top scorers ===
Rank	Player	Club	Goals
1	(Brazil) Bergson	Johor Darul Ta'zim	29
2	(Brazil) Caion	Selangor	14
3	(Italy) Fernando Forestieri	Johor Darul Ta'zim	13
3	(Cameroon) Ronald Ngah	Kedah Darul Aman	13
3	(Ivory Coast) Kipré Tchétché	Terengganu	13
6	(Brazil) Gustavo	Negeri Sembilan	11
7	(Malaysia) Darren Lok	Petaling Jaya City	10
8	(Colombia) Steven Rodriguez	Sri Pahang	9
9	(South Korea) Park Tae-Soo	Sabah	8
10	(Nigeria) Ifedayo Olusegun	Melaka	7
10	(Argentina) Manuel Hidalgo	Sri Pahang	7
12	8 players	6 Clubs	6
20	7 players	7 Clubs	5
27	8 players	7 Clubs	4
35	13 players	9 Clubs	3
48	20 players	11 Clubs	2
68	56 players	12 Clubs	1

== 2023 ==
The 2023 Malaysia Super League is the 20th season of the highest Malaysian football league since its inception in 2004. Twelve teams participated in the league. The season began on 24 February 2023 and concluded on 17 December 2023.

It is the first season after restructuring, with 18 teams (instead of 12). However, MFL announced there will be only 16 teams as they rejected both Sarawak United and Melaka United due to a failed licensing appeal. The league shrunk to 15 teams after Petaling Jaya City officially withdrew due to the expansion and increased foreign player quota, which are diverted from the club's main vision. On 5 January 2023, UiTM officially withdrew due to the financial problems. The new season therefore has 14 teams, kicking off on 24 February.

=== League table ===
Pos	Team	Pld	W	D	L	GF	GA	GD	Pts	Qualification or relegation
1	Johor Darul Ta'zim (C)	26	25	1	0	100	7	+93	76	Qualification for the AFC Champions League Elite league stage
2	Selangor	26	20	1	5	72	22	+50	61	Qualification for the AFC Champions League Two group stage (Note: Since the winners of the 2023 Malaysia FA Cup (Johor Darul Ta'zim) qualified for Asian competition based on their league positions, the berths awarded to the 2nd-placed team in the league.)
3	Sabah	26	17	3	6	64	33	+31	54	
4	Kedah Darul Aman	26	17	2	7	52	29	+23	53	
5	Sri Pahang	26	13	6	7	44	33	+11	45	
6	Terengganu	26	11	7	8	45	34	+11	40	Qualification for the AFF Shopee Cup group stage (Note: Qualified as the 2023 Malaysia Cup & 2023 Malaysia FA Cup runner-up.)
7	Kuala Lumpur City	26	10	8	8	44	39	+5	38	Qualification for the AFF Shopee Cup group stage
8	PDRM	26	11	4	11	35	37	−2	37	
9	Negeri Sembilan	26	6	9	11	33	49	−16	27	
10	Penang	26	6	6	14	29	50	−21	24	
11	Perak	26	6	4	16	25	55	−30	22	
12	Kelantan United	26	4	5	17	29	65	−36	17	
13	Kuching City	26	2	6	18	24	51	−27	12	
14	Kelantan (Note: MFL officially snubs Kelantan club licensing approval.)	26	2	2	22	29	121	−92	8	Ejected from Malaysian Super League

Source: MFL
Rules for classification: 1) Points; 2) Goal difference; 3) Number of goals scored.
(C) Champions

=== Top scorers ===
As of 17 December 2023

Rank	Player	Club	Goals
1	(Colombia) Ayron del Valle	Selangor	23
2	(Brazil) Bergson Da Silva	Johor Darul Ta'zim	21
3	(Italy) Fernando Forestieri	Johor Darul Ta'zim	19
4	(Liberia) Abu Kamara	Kuching City	13
5	(Malaysia) Arif Aiman Hanapi	Johor Darul Ta'zim	12
5	(Liberia) Kpah Sherman	Sri Pahang	12
5	(Bahrain) Ifedayo Olusegun	Kedah Darul Aman	12
5	(Malaysia) Faisal Halim	Selangor	12
9	(Croatia) Ivan Mamut	Terengganu	11
9	(Brazil) Paulo Josué	Kuala Lumpur City	11
11	(Japan) Bruno Suzuki	PDRM	10
11	(Argentina) Stefano Brundo	Sri Pahang	10

== See also ==
- Malaysia Super League
- Malaysia Super League seasons
