= 2007–08 Johor F.C. season =

Johor FC
2007–08 season
- Owner: Johor Corporation
- Manager: Mohd Faizal Abdullah
- Head Coach: Ramlan Rasid
- Stadium: Pasir Gudang Stadium
- Super League: 3rd
- FA Cup: First round
- Malaysia Cup: Semi-finals
- Top goalscorer: League: Walter Ariel Silva (14); All: Walter Ariel Silva (16)
- Biggest win: 4–0 vs Penang (A), 11 March 2008, Super League
- Biggest defeat: 1–4 vs Kedah (A), 2 August 2008, Malaysia Cup
Home colours	Away colours

The 2007–08 season was Johor Football Club's 37th season in club history, their 2nd season in the Malaysia Super League since its rebranding in 2004, and their 4th in the Malaysian first division.

Johor FC competed in the 2007–08 Malaysia Super League, 2008 Malaysia FA Cup and 2008 Malaysia Cup. In the Super League, they finished third with 46 points from 24 matches. In the FA Cup, they were eliminated by Perak FA in the First round. In the Malaysia Cup, they reached the semi-finals before losing to Selangor 2–1 on aggregate. Johor FC's third-place league finish qualified them for the 2009 AFC Cup.

== Season overview ==

Johor FC's usual starting lineup in the 2007–08 season

The 2007–08 season was a memorable campaign for Johor FC, as they finished third in the Malaysia Super League and reached the Malaysia Cup semi-finals, qualifying for the AFC Cup for the first time in their history

=== Super League ===
Johor FC enjoyed a solid Malaysia Super League campaign, finishing third with 46 points from 24 matches, recording 14 wins, 4 draws, and 6 defeats, with 40 goals scored and 27 conceded for a goal difference of +13. The campaign ran from 18 November 2007 to 13 August 2008, with Johor FC finishing behind champions Kedah and runners-up Negeri Sembilan. The third-place finish also earned Johor FC qualification for the 2009 AFC Cup, marking the club's first-ever entry into continental competition. Notable results included a 2–1 win over Terengganu in the opening match, with Walter Ariel Silva scoring twice, and a 4–0 win over Penang.

=== FA Cup ===
In the Malaysia FA Cup, Johor FC's campaign was brief, ending in the first. After being drawn against Perak, Johor FC won the first leg 2–0 at home. However, they lost the second leg 0–3 and were eliminated 2–3 on aggregate, exiting in the first round. The early exit meant Johor FC's only realistic chance of silverware that season rested on the Malaysia Cup.

=== Malaysia Cup ===
The Malaysia Cup was the highlight of Johor FC's 2007–08 season. In the group stage, Johor FC finished second in Group B with 20 points from 10 matches, recording six wins, two draws, and two defeats, with 22 goals scored and 15 conceded, qualifying for the knockout stage alongside group winners Kedah and third-placed PDRM. Notable group-stage results included a 3–1 win over Kuala Lumpur, a 3–2 win over PDRM, and a 3–1 win over Sabah. In the quarter-finals, Johor FC faced UPB-MyTeam. After losing the first leg 1–3 away, Johor FC won the second leg 5–1 after extra time to progress 6–4 on aggregate. In the semi-finals, Johor FC lost 0–2 to Selangor, ending their campaign at the last-four stage. Selangor ultimately reached the final, where they were defeated 3–2 by Kedah.

== Player Information ==
=== Full Squad ===
No.	Name	Age	Nat.	Position	Join	Signed From	D.O.B
Goalkeepers
21	Zaidi Ibrahim	20	(Malaysia)	GK	2007	(Malaysia) Youth systems	21 February 1988
22	Anis Faron	26	(Malaysia)	GK	2008	(Malaysia) Selangor	9 November 1982
23	G. Jeevananthan	28	(Malaysia)	GK	2008	(Malaysia) Sabah	13 Mar 1980
Defenders
6	M. Sivakumar	25	(Malaysia)	CB / DM	2006	(Malaysia) Youth systems	6 March 1984
5	Sumardi Hajalan	24	(Malaysia)	CB / CM	2006	(Malaysia) Sabah	12 Jan. 1985
2	Wan Rohaimi	33	(Malaysia)	CB	2006	(Malaysia) Selangor	19 May 1976
11	Khairi Kiman	25	(Malaysia)	CB	2004	(Malaysia) Youth systems	3 March 1984
3	Hamzani Omar	31	(Malaysia)	CB	2007	(Malaysia) Johor FA	30 Sep 1978
4	Farid Ramli	21	(Malaysia)	LB	2006	(Malaysia) Youth systems	28 April 1987
13	Moudourou Moise	23	(Cameroon)	CB	2008	(Singapore) Young Lions	15 Sept. 1985
12	Madzlan Emoi	33	(Malaysia)	RB	2007	(Malaysia) Perlis	25 April 1974
16	Daudsu Jamaludin	22	(Malaysia)	RB	2005	(Malaysia) Kelantan	18 March 1985
Midfielders
15	Riduwan Maon	27	(Malaysia)	CB / DM / CM	2006	(Malaysia) Youth systems	5 Oct. 1981
8	Azizan Baba	28	(Malaysia)	CM	2005	(Malaysia) Malacca United	9 Sept 1981
9	Eddy Helmi	30	(Malaysia)	CM / AM	2001	(Malaysia) Youth systems	8 Dec. 1979
17	Azuwad Arip	27	(Malaysia)	DM	2005	(Malaysia) Youth systems	5 Oct. 1985
7	Ezaidy Khadar	27	(Malaysia)	AM / ST	2004	(Malaysia) Youth systems	17 Jan. 1983
20	Adam See	21	(Malaysia)	CM	2008	(Malaysia) Youth systems	3 June 1988
73	Azwan Roya	22	(Malaysia)	MF	2005	(Malaysia) Kelantan FA	25 June 1986
Forwards
19	Syaiful Sabtu	25	(Malaysia)	ST	2005	(Malaysia) Youth systems	25 Oct. 1981
31	Walter Ariel Silva	27	(Argentina)	CF	2006	(Argentina) Sportivo Italiano	18 November 1981
24	Wan Hoesne	23	(Malaysia)	ST / CF	2008	(Malaysia) Selangor	2 Sept 1987
18	Fahruzzahar Ali	25	(Malaysia)	ST	2005	(Malaysia) Youth systems	13 April 1984
29	Gustavo Fuentes	34	(Argentina)	ST	2007	(Argentina) Santiago Morning	8 April 1973

== Transfers ==
In

No.	Pos.	Name	Age	From
22	GK	(Malaysia) Mohd Anis Faron	26	(Malaysia) Selangor
23	GK	(Malaysia) G. Jeevananthan	28	(Malaysia) Sabah
3	DF	(Malaysia) Hamzani Omar	31	(Malaysia) Johor FA
13	DF	(Cameroon) Moudourou Moise	23	(Singapore) Young Lions
12	DF	(Malaysia) Madzlan Emoi	33	(Malaysia) Perlis
24	FW	(Malaysia) Wan Mohd Hoesne	24	(Malaysia) Selangor
29	FW	(Argentina) Gustavo Fuentes	34	(Argentina) Santiago Morning

Out

No.	Pos.	Name	Age	To
12	DF	(Thailand) Choketawee Promrut	32	(Thailand) Provincial Electricity Authority
12	DF	(Malaysia) Khairun Haled	30	retired
13	DF	(Malaysia) Mohamad Nor Ismail	25	(Malaysia) Perak
29	FW	(Nigeria) Abdul Sule	32	(Nigeria) Plateau United
24	FW	(Argentina) Gastón Marcel Conlon	–	(Morocco) Hassania Agadir
3	DF	(Malaysia) Wahab Mansor	–	DPMM Brunei
25	DF	(Singapore) Aide Iskandar	32	(Singapore) Geylang International
22	GK	(Malaysia) Mohd Yusof Ishak	26	(Malaysia) Perlis

== Competitions ==
=== Overview ===
Competition	First match	Last match	Starting round	Final position	Record							
Competition	First match	Last match	Starting round	Final position	Pld	W	D	L	GF	GA	GD	Win %
Malaysia Super League	18 November 2007	4 May 2008	Matchday 1	3rd	24	14	4	6	40	27	+13	58.33
Malaysia FA Cup	19 February 2008	4 March 2008	First round	First round	2	1	0	1	2	3	−1	50.00
Malaysia Cup	11 June 2008	16 August 2008	Group stage	Semi-finals	14	8	2	4	29	21	+8	57.14
Total					40	23	6	11	71	51	+20	57.50

Last updated: 28 October 2026
Source: Competitions

=== Malaysia Super League ===
==== Matches ====
Win Draw Loss

18 November 2007 1	Johor FC	2–1	Terengganu	Pasir Gudang, Johor
	56' Walter Silva Ariel; 90+3' Walter Silva Ariel		3' Fabian Flor	Stadium: Stadium Pasir Gudang

21 November 2007 2	Selangor	1–1	Johor FC	Shah Alam, Selangor
	90+2' Mohd Amri Yahyah		65' Eddy Helmi Manan	Stadium: Shah Alam Stadium

18 December 2007 3	Johor FC	0–0	DPMM	Pasir Gudang, Johor
				Stadium: Pasir Gudang Stadium

23 December 2007 4	UPB–MyTeam	2–2	Johor FC	Petaling Jaya, Selangor
	62' Haris Safwan; 79' Andreas Sebastian Romano		36' Eddy Helmi Manan; 85' Gustavo Fuentes	Stadium: MBPJ Stadium

29 December 2007 5	Johor FC	2–0	Perak	Pasir Gudang, Johor
	16' Gustavo Fuentes; 90+3' Ezaidy Khadar			Stadium: Pasir Gudang Stadium

1 January 2008 6	Negeri Sembilan	2–0	Johor FC	Paroi, Negeri Sembilan
	14' Mohd Zaquan Adha; 20' Affendy Malek			Stadium: Tuanku Abdul Rahman Stadium

12 January 2008 7	Johor FC	3–1	Sarawak	Pasir Gudang, Johor
	4' Gustavo Fuentes; 32' Gustavo Fuentes; 87' Ezaidy Khadar		43' Myom Myom Aloys	Stadium: Pasir Gudang Stadium

15 January 2008 8	Penang	0–0	Johor FC	George Town, Penang
				Stadium: Stadium Bandaraya

19 January 2008 9	Johor FC	1–3	Kedah	Pasir Gudang, Johor
	66' Riduan Maon		43' Badrol Bakhtiar; 71' Marlon Alex James; 86' Marlon Alex James	Stadium: Pasir Gudang Stadium

26 January 2008 10	Perlis	3–1	Johor FC	Kangar, Perlis
	34' Phillimon Chipeta; 63' Phillimon Chipeta; 81' K. Soley		32' Walter Silva	Stadium: Stadium Utama Negeri

29 January 2008 11	Johor FC	1–0	Pahang	Pasir Gudang, Johor
	42' Andres Fuentes Gustavo			Stadium: Pasir Gudang Stadium

2 February 2008 12	PDRM	1–2	Johor FC	Kuala Lumpur, Malaysia
	90' Azlan Ismail		1' Walter Silva; 54' Andrea Fuentes Gustavo	Stadium: MPS Stadium

12 February 2008 13	Johor FC	2–0	PDRM	Pasir Gudang, Johor
	44' Gustavo Fuentes; 86' Mohd Saiful Sabtu			Stadium: Pasir Gudang Stadium

16 February 2008 14	Pahang	2–1	Johor FC	Kuantan, Pahang
	11' Keita Boubacar; 29' Azizul Kamaluddin		72' Mohd Syaiful Sabtu	Stadium: Stadium Darul Makmur

23 February 2008 15	Johor FC	1–0	Perlis	Pasir Gudang, Johor
	2' Gustavo Fuentes			Stadium: Pasir Gudang Stadium

26 February 2008 16	Kedah	2–0	Johor FC	Alor Setar, Kedah
	3' Marlon Alex James; 78' Marlon Alex James			Stadium: Stadium Darul Aman

1 March 2008 17	Johor FC	4–0	Penang	Pasir Gudang, Johor
	2' Eddy Helmi; 12' Walter Ariel Silva; 67' Mohd Raduwan Maon; 86' Mohammad Ezaidy			Stadium: Pasir Gudang Stadium

11 March 2008 18	Sarawak	0–4	Johor FC	Kuching, Sarawak
			42' Mohd Riduwan Maon; 52' Mohd Azizan Baba; 62' Walter Silva; 88' (pen.) Walter Silva	Stadium: Sarawak Stadium

30 March 2008 19	Johor FC	2–4	Negeri Sembilan	Pasir Gudang, Johor
	89' (pen.) Walter Silva; 90+3' Gustavo Fuentes		43' S. Kunalan; 78' Udo Fortune; 84' Udo Fortune; 90+2' Mohd Aidil Zaquan	Stadium: Pasir Gudang Stadium

5 April 2008 20	Perak	1–2	Johor FC	Ipoh, Perak
	72' Mario Berrios		3' Walter Silva; 23' Walter Silva	Stadium: Perak Stadium

12 April 2008 21	Johor FC	2–1	UPB–MyTeam	Pasir Gudang, Johor
	19' Mohd Riduwan Maon; 27' Mohd Riduwan Maon		72' Edvaldo Goncalves Pereira	Stadium: Pasir Gudang Stadium

19 April 2008 22	DPMM	0–2	Johor FC	Bandar Seri Begawan, Brunei
			27' Walter Ariel Silva; 63' Eddy Helmi Manan	Stadium: Hassanal Bolkiah National Stadium

26 April 2008 23	Johor FC	3–2	Selangor	Pasir Gudang, Johor
	72' Eddy Helmi; 77' Gustavo Fuentes; 79' Walter Ariel Silva		53' (pen.) Frank Seator; 81' Frank Seator	Stadium: Pasir Gudang Stadium

4 May 2008 24	Terengganu	1–2	Johor FC	Kuala Terengganu, Terengganu
	55' Zairo Anuar		51' Walter Silva; 58' Walter Silva	Stadium: Sultan Ismail Nasiruddin Shah Stadium

==== League table ====
Pos	Team	Pld	W	D	L	GF	GA	GD	Pts	Qualification or relegation
1	Kedah	24	18	2	4	55	24	+31	56	Qualification for the AFC Cup
2	Negeri Sembilan	24	14	6	4	48	30	+18	48	
3	Johor FC	24	14	4	6	40	27	+13	46	Qualification for the AFC Cup
4	Selangor	24	14	3	7	46	36	+10	45	
5	Perak	24	13	2	9	46	34	+12	41	

=== Malaysia FA Cup ===
==== First round ====
Win Draw Loss

19 February 2008 1st leg	Johor FC	2–0	Perak	Pasir Gudang, Johor
	45' Mohd Nurul Azwan Rayya; 85' Walter Ariel Silva			Stadium: Pasir Gudang Stadium

4 March 2008 2nd leg	Perak	3–0 (3–2 agg.)	Johor FC	Ipoh, Perak
	45+2' Ahmad Shahrul Azhar; 63' Sharulnizam Mustapa; 90+3' Mohd Khalid Jamlus			Stadium: Perak Stadium

=== Malaysia Cup ===
==== Group stage ====
Pos	Team	Pld	W	D	L	GF	GA	GD	Pts	Qualification
1	Kedah	10	6	3	1	28	12	+16	21	Advance to knockout stage
2	Johor FC	10	6	2	2	22	15	+7	20	Advance to knockout stage
3	PDRM	10	5	3	2	23	13	+10	18	Advance to knockout stage
4	Kuala Lumpur	10	3	2	5	10	23	−13	11	
5	Sabah	10	2	1	7	15	25	−10	7	
6	Penang	10	2	1	7	11	21	−10	7	

Updated to match(es) played on unknown. Source:

11 June 2008 1	Johor FC	3–1	Kuala Lumpur	Pasir Gudang, Johor
	52' Mohd Riduwan Maon; 69' Mohd Riduwan Maon; 74' Mohd Riduwan Maon		4' Mohd Hafzairi Amir	Stadium: Pasir Gudang Stadium

16 Jun 2008 2	PDRM	1–1	Johor FC	Selayang, Selangor
	66' Hillary Echesa		51' Mohd Riduwan Maon	Stadium: Selayang Stadium

27 June 2008 3	Sabah	2–1	Johor FC	Kota Kinabalu, Sabah
	36' Hishamuddin Othman; 56' Sylvester Sindih		27' Gustavo Fuentes	Stadium: Likas Stadium

30 June 2008 4	Johor FC	3–1	Penang	Pasir Gudang, Johor
	20' Faruzzahar Ali; 34' Faruzzahar Ali; 44' (pen.) Faruzzahar Ali		24' Mohd Farizal Rozali	Stadium: Pasir Gudang Stadium

3 July 2008 5	Johor FC	1–1	Kedah	Pasir Gudang, Johor
	18' Faruzzahar Ali		28' Marlon Alex James	Stadium: Pasir Gudang Stadium

6 July 2008 6	Kuala Lumpur	1–4	Johor FC	Cheras, Kuala Lumpur
	36' Mohd Suhaimi Suib		49' Mohd Nurul Azwan Roya; 68' M. Sivakumar; 74' Gustavo Fuentes; 86' Mohd Nurul Azwan Roya	Stadium: Kuala Lumpur Football Stadium

15 July 2008 7	Johor FC	3–1	Sabah	Pasir Gudang, Johor
	20' Khairu Kiman; 47' Mohd Azuwan Md Arip; 90+1' Syaiful Sabtu		81' Bobby Gonzales	Stadium: Pasir Gudang Stadium

8	Penang	1–2	Johor FC	George Town, Penang
	32' Amir Shahreen Mubin		10' Adam See; 52' Syaiful Sabtu	Stadium: Stadium Bandaraya

26 July 2008 9	Johor FC	3–2	PDRM	Pasir Gudang, Johor
	41' Gustavo Fuentes; 46' Azuwad Arip; 78' Gustavo Fuentes		9' Norfarhan Mohammad; 54' Hillary Echesa	Stadium: Pasir Gudang Stadium

2 August 2008 10	Kedah	4–1	Johor FC	Alor Setar, Kedah
	24' Nelson San Martín; 51' Marlon Alex James; 62' Marlon Alex James; 86' Marlon Alex James		18' Faruzzahar Ali	Stadium: Stadium Darul Aman

==== Quarter-finals ====
6 August 2008 1st leg	UPB–MyTeam	3–1	Johor FC	Kelana Jaya, Selangor
	5' Zamri Chin; 71' Saša Branezac; 73' Saša Branezac		10' Eddy Helmi Manan	Stadium: MBPJ Stadium

9 August 2008 2nd leg	Johor FC	5–1 (6–4 agg.)	UPB–MyTeam	Pasir Gudang, Johor
	19' Gustavo Fuentes; 54' Nurul Azwan Roya; 57' Nurul Azwan Roya; 110' Syaiful Sabtu; 113' See Kok Luen		88' Saša Branezac	Stadium: Pasir Gudang Stadium

==== Semifinals ====
13 August 2008 1st leg	Selangor	2–0	Johor FC	Shah Alam, Selangor
	18' Safee Sali; 92' R. Surendren			Stadium: Shah Alam Stadium

16 August 2008 2nd leg	Johor FC	1–0 (1–2 agg.)	Selangor	Pasir Gudang, Johor
	35' Walter Ariel Silva			Stadium: Pasir Gudang Stadium

== Club statistics ==
Includes all competitive matches. The list is sorted by shirt number when total goals are equal.

As of match played 5 October 2013

Rank	Pos.	No.	Player	Super League	FA Cup	Malaysia Cup	Total
1	FW	31	(Argentina) Walter Ariel Silva	14	1	1	17
2	FW	29	(Argentina) Gustavo Fuentes	10	0	5	15
3	MF	15	(Malaysia) Riduwan Maon	5	0	4	9
4	MF	9	(Malaysia) Eddy Helmi	5	0	1	6
5	FW	19	(Malaysia) Syaiful Sabtu	2	0	3	5
6	FW	18	(Malaysia) Fahruzzahar Ali	0	0	5	5
7	MF	73	(Malaysia) Azwan Roya	0	1	4	5
8	MF	20	(Malaysia) Adam See	0	0	2	2
9	MF	8	(Malaysia) Azizan Baba	0	0	1	1
10	DF	6	(Malaysia) M. Sivakumar	0	0	1	1
11	DF	11	(Malaysia) Khairi Kiman	0	0	1	1
12	MF	17	(Malaysia) Azuwad Arip	0	0	1	1
TOTALS				40	2	29	71
