= 2003 Liga Perdana 1 =

Liga Perdana 1 season

Liga Perdana 1
- Season: 2003
- Dates: 9 February – 6 July 2003
- Champions: Perak; 2nd Premier League One title 2nd Liga M title
- Relegated: Johor FC; TM F.C. Kelantan; Malacca; Selangor; Terengganu
- 2004 AFC Cup: Perak (group stage); Negeri Sembilan (group stage)
- Matches: 156
- Goals: 454 (2.91 per match)
- Top goalscorer: 23 goals Phillimon Chepita (Perlis)

The 2003 Liga Perdana 1 season is the sixth and final season of Liga Perdana 1. A total of 13 teams participated in the season out of 14 as NS Chempaka FC withdrew from the league.

The Liga Perdana 1 was introduced in 1998. It replaced the Liga Perdana (1994–97) as the top-tier football league in Malaysia.

The season kicked off on 9 February 2003. Perak again dominated the season and ended up winning the title. Perlis's Phillimon Chepita was the season's top goalscorer with 23 goals.

This season also the last season before the league was succeeded by the formation of Liga Super from 2004 season onwards while Liga Premier was formed to become the new second-tier league in Malaysian football league system. The teams from 2003 season undergoes a qualifying stage to be promoted into inaugural 2004 Malaysia Super League.

== Teams ==
A total of 13 teams will participate in the 2003 Liga Perdana 1 season. (Negeri Sembilan) NS Chempaka FC pulled out of the league.

- Perak FA (2002 Liga Perdana 1 champions)
- Selangor FA
- Sabah FA
- Penang FA
- Terengganu FA
- Johor FC
- Perlis FA
- Sarawak FA
- Pahang FA
- Kelantan FA
- Malacca FA
- Kedah FA (Promoted as 2002 Liga Perdana 2 champions)
- (Malacca) Melaka Telekom (Promoted as 2002 Liga Perdana 2 runner-up)

Note:

- (Negeri Sembilan) NS Chempaka FC pulled out of the league.

==== League table ====
| Pos | Team | Pld | W | D | L | GF | GA | GD | Pts | Qualification or relegation |
|---|---|---|---|---|---|---|---|---|---|---|
| 1 | Perak FA (C) | 24 | 13 | 8 | 3 | 38 | 22 | +16 | 47 | Qualification for the AFC Cup |
| 2 | Kedah FA | 24 | 13 | 6 | 5 | 43 | 17 | +26 | 45 | |
| 3 | Perlis FA | 24 | 13 | 6 | 5 | 40 | 23 | +17 | 45 | |
| 4 | Sabah FA | 24 | 10 | 8 | 6 | 34 | 22 | +12 | 38 | |
| 5 | Pahang FA | 24 | 10 | 6 | 8 | 38 | 33 | +5 | 36 | |
| 6 | Penang FA | 24 | 11 | 3 | 10 | 29 | 28 | +1 | 36 | |
| 7 | Johor FC (R) | 24 | 10 | 4 | 10 | 42 | 32 | +10 | 34 | Relegated to Liga Premier |
| 8 | Sarawak FA | 24 | 9 | 7 | 8 | 47 | 42 | +5 | 34 | |
| 9 | (Malacca) Melaka Telekom (R) | 24 | 7 | 11 | 6 | 32 | 34 | −2 | 32 | Relegated to Liga Premier |
| 10 | Kelantan FA (R) | 24 | 7 | 7 | 10 | 31 | 52 | −21 | 28 | Relegated to Liga Premier |
| 11 | Malacca FA (R) | 24 | 5 | 5 | 14 | 24 | 53 | −29 | 20 | Relegated to Liga Premier |
| 12 | Selangor FA (R) | 24 | 4 | 6 | 14 | 32 | 44 | −12 | 18 | Relegated to Liga Premier |
| 13 | Terengganu FA (R) | 24 | 4 | 3 | 17 | 24 | 52 | −28 | 15 | Relegated to Liga Premier |

Source: rsssf.com
(C) Champions; (R) Relegated

Note

- Clubs places 1st to 6th will be entering Liga Super automatically.
- Clubs places 7th to 10th will be entering Liga Super playoffs.
- Clubs places 11th to 13th will be relegating to Liga Premier.

== 2004 Malaysia Super League playoffs ==
A total of 8 teams will participate in the 2004 Malaysia Super League season playoffs.

- Johor FC (2003 Liga Perdana 1 7th place)
- Sarawak FA (2003 Liga Perdana 1 8th place)
- (Malacca) Melaka Telekom (2003 Liga Perdana 1 9th place)
- Kelantan FA (2003 Liga Perdana 1 10th place)
- (Selangor) Public Bank FC (2003 Liga Perdana 2 champions)
- Negeri Sembilan FA (2003 Liga Perdana 2 runners-up)
- Johor FA (2003 Liga Perdana 2 3rd place)
- (Selangor) MPPJ (2003 Liga Perdana 2 4th place)

=== Results ===
==== First round ====
===== First Legs =====
6 August 2003
20:45

| MPPJ (Selangor) | 4 – 1 | Negeri Sembilan FA |
|---|---|---|
| Annuar Abu Bakar 22', 65'; Bruno Martelotto 56'; Azlan Meri 88' | | Efendi Abdul Malek 6' |

MPPJ Stadium, Kelana Jaya

6 August 2003
20:45

| Public Bank FC (Selangor) | 3 – 1 | Johor FA |
|---|---|---|
| Zulkifli Chek Din 12'; Shahrilnizam Khalil (64 own goal); Ivan Ziga 67' | | Suhaimi Jamil 70' |

MPS Stadium, Selayang

6 August 2003
20:15

| Sarawak FA | 3 – 1 | (Malacca) Melaka Telekom |
|---|---|---|
| Robert Eshun 23'; Sapian Abdul Wahed 65'; Wong Sai Kong 74' | | Nazzab Hidzan 81' (pen.) |

State Stadium, Petra Jaya, Kuching

6 August 2003
20:45

| Johor FC | 1 – 0 | Kelantan FA |
|---|---|---|
| Ivan Zelic 31' |

Pasir Gudang Stadium, Pasir Gudang, Johor Bahru

===== Second Legs =====
9 August 2003
20:45

| Negeri Sembilan | 4 – 2 | (Selangor) MPPJ |
|---|---|---|
| Suharmin Yusof 58', 71'; K. Sathian 62'; K. Rajan 75' | | Mohd Haris Safwan Mohd Kamal 38'; Annuar Abu Bakar 56' |

Tuanku Abdul Rahman Stadium, Paroi, Seremban
- (Selangor) MPPJ qualified 6-5 on aggregate.

9 August 2003
20:45

| Johor FA | 3 – 3 | (Selangor) Public Bank FC |
|---|---|---|
| P. Gunasekaran 56'; Mohd Farid Ideris 73'; Ante Juric 90' | | Milan Strelec 36' (pen.), 50'; Ivan Ziga 42' |

Tan Sri Dato Hj Hassan Yunos Stadium, Larkin, Johor Bahru
- (Selangor) Public Bank FC qualified 6-4 on aggregate.

9 August 2003
20:45

| Melaka Telekom (Malacca) | 0 – 1 | Sarawak FA |
|---|---|---|
| | | Sapian Abdul Wahed 23' |

Hang Jebat Stadium, Paya Rumput, Malacca
- Sarawak FA qualified 4-1 on aggregate.

9 August 2003
20:45

| Kelantan FA | 1 – 0 | Johor FC |
|---|---|---|
| Badrul Afzan Razali 72' |

Sultan Mohammad IV Stadium, Kota Bharu
- Johor FC qualified 1-1 on aggregate, 4-2 on penalties.

==== Final Round ====
===== First Legs =====
13 August 2003
20:45

| MPPJ (Selangor) | 3 – 2 | Sarawak FA |
|---|---|---|
| Annuar Abu Bakar 57', 85'; Kamarulzaman Yub Majid 68' | | Gilbert Cassidy Gawing 60'; Ramles Sari 90' |

MPPJ Stadium, Kelana Jaya

13 August 2003
20:45

| Public Bank FC (Selangor) | 1 – 2 | Johor FC |
|---|---|---|
| Ivan Ziga 54' | | Hairi Azly Mohamad 48'; Jonathan Angelucci 89' |

MPS Stadium, Selayang

===== Second Legs =====
16 August 2003
20:45

| Sarawak FA | 3 – 1 | (Selangor) MPPJ |
|---|---|---|
| Gilbert Cassidy Gawing 16', 44'; Sapian Abdul Wahed 120' | | Bruno Martelotto 15' |

Tuanku Abdul Rahman Stadium, Paroi, Seremban
- Sarawak FA qualified 5-4 on aggregate.

16 August 2003
20:45

| Johor FC | 1 – 2 | (Selangor) Public Bank FC |
|---|---|---|
| Zami Mohd Noor 87' | | Ivan Ziga 64', 79' |

Pasir Gudang Stadium, Pasir Gudang, Johor Bahru
- (Selangor) Public Bank FC qualified 3-3 on aggregate, 5-4 on penalties.

Note

- Sarawak FA and (Selangor) Public Bank FC qualifies for 2004 Malaysia Super League.

== Top goalscorers ==
Source: FIFA: Liga Perdana 1 Scorers

| Rank | Scorer | Club | Goals |
|---|---|---|---|
| 1 | (Zambia) Phillimon Chepita | Perlis FA | 23 |

== Champions ==
2003 Liga Perdana 1 winner

2nd title
