= 2004 Malaysia Super League =

2004 Liga Super

Liga Super
- Season: 2004
- Dates: 14 February – 3 August 2004
- Champions: Pahang; 1st title
- Relegated: Kedah; Sarawak
- 2005 AFC Cup: Pahang; Perak
- ASEAN Club Championship: Pahang
- Matches: 84
- Goals: 271 (3.23 per match)
- Top goalscorer: Indra Putra Mahayuddin (15 goals, Pahang)

The 2004 Liga Super, also known as the Dunhill Liga Super, was the inaugural season of the Liga Super, the top-tier professional football league in Malaysia.

The season was held from 14 February and concluded on 14 August 2004. This league participated by 8 teams, six west teams and two east teams, Sabah and Sarawak. The Liga Super champions for 2004 was Pahang.

Pahang dominated the season and ended up winning the title by a wide margin and this was down to their efforts in securing the services of the nation's top players prior to the start of the new season. Pahang's Indra Putra Mahayuddin was the season's top goalscorer with 15 goals. He held the record as the only local players which won the accolade until the end of 2009 season.

The highest scoring match of the season was Perlis 6–2 defeat of Kedah on 31 July 2004.

Another surprising club performance in this season was the strong finish of club side Public Bank. At this time, the Football Association of Malaysia were trying to promote clubs as the future of Malaysian football.

== Team changes ==
The following teams have changed division since the 2003 season.

=== To Malaysia Super League ===
Promoted from Liga Perdana 2

- Public Bank FC

=== From 2003 Liga Perdana 1 ===
Relegated to Premier League

- Johor FC
- Melaka Telekom
- Kelantan FA
- Malacca FA
- Selangor FA
- Terengganu FA

== Stadiums and locations ==
Locations of teams in the 2004 Liga Super

| Team | Location | Stadium | Capacity |
|---|---|---|---|
| Kedah | Alor Setar | Darul Aman Stadium | 32,387 |
| Pahang | Kuantan | Darul Makmur Stadium | 40,000 |
| Penang | Batu Kawan | Penang State Stadium | 40,000 |
| Perak | Ipoh | Perak Stadium | 35,000 |
| Perlis | Kangar | Utama Stadium | 20,000 |
| (Selangor) Public Bank | Selangor | Selayang Stadium | 20,000 |
| Sabah | Kota Kinabalu | Likas Stadium | 30,000 |
| Sarawak | Kuching | Sarawak Stadium | 40,000 |

== Foreign players ==
| Team | Player 1 | Player 2 | Player 3 | Player 4 |
|---|---|---|---|---|
| Kedah | (Brazil) Tavares | (Brazil) Marco Antonio Manso | (Argentina) Gastón Stang | (Argentina) Leonardo Adrian Veron |
| Pahang | (Australia) Ante Milicic | Khaled Ragab | Oussame Camara | Simon Colosimo |
| Penang | (Russia) Vyacheslav Melnikov | Cristian Fedor | | |
| Perak | (Liberia) Frank Seator | Basile Essa Mvondo | Emmanuel Zulu | |
| Perlis | Lamine Conteh | (Zambia) Phillimon Chipeta | | |
| (Selangor) Public Bank | (Slovakia) Ivan Ziga | (Argentina) Gustavo Fuentes | Milan Strelec | |
| Sabah | Kim Tyrone Grant | | | |
| Sarawak | (Guinea-Bissau) Fernando Manuel Co | | | |

== League table ==
| Pos | Team | Pld | W | D | L | GF | GA | GD | Pts | Qualification or relegation |
|---|---|---|---|---|---|---|---|---|---|---|
| 1 | Pahang (C) | 21 | 14 | 5 | 2 | 48 | 29 | +19 | 47 | Qualification to AFC Cup group stage and ASEAN Club Championship |
| 2 | Public Bank | 21 | 11 | 5 | 5 | 38 | 29 | +9 | 38 | |
| 3 | Perlis | 21 | 10 | 6 | 5 | 41 | 30 | +11 | 36 | |
| 4 | Perak | 21 | 10 | 6 | 5 | 35 | 27 | +8 | 36 | Qualification to AFC Cup group stage (Note: Perak qualified for the 2005 AFC Cup group stage as 2004 Piala FA winners.) |
| 5 | Penang | 21 | 8 | 3 | 10 | 29 | 38 | −9 | 27 | |
| 6 | Sabah | 21 | 4 | 5 | 12 | 22 | 35 | −13 | 17 | |
| 7 | Sarawak (R) | 21 | 3 | 7 | 11 | 28 | 38 | −10 | 16 | Relegation to Liga Premier |
| 8 | Kedah (R) | 21 | 4 | 3 | 14 | 30 | 45 | −15 | 15 | Relegation to Liga Premier |

Source: RSSSF
Rules for classification: 1) Points; 2) Goal difference; 3) Number of goals scored.
(C) Champions; (R) Relegated

== Season statistics ==
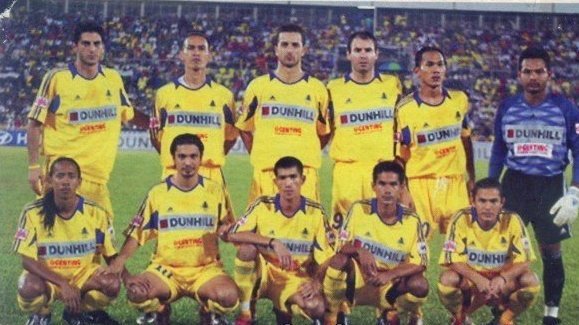
Pahang, the 2004 Liga Super champion

=== Top scorers ===
| Position | Players | Teams/Clubs | Goals |
|---|---|---|---|
| 1 | (Malaysia) Indra Putra Mahayuddin | Pahang FA | 15 |
| 2 | (Liberia) Frank Seator | Perak FA | 14 |
| 3 | (Argentina) Gustavo Fuentes (Brazil) Tavares | (Selangor) Public Bank FC; Kedah FA | 11 |
| 5 | (Russia) Vyacheslav Melnikov | Penang FA | 10 |
| 6 | (Australia) Ante Milicic (Guinea-Bissau) Fernando Manuel Co (Slovakia) Ivan Ziga (Zambia) Phillimon Chipeta (Malaysia) Yusri Che Lah | Pahang FA; Sarawak FA (Selangor) Public Bank FC; Perlis FA; Perlis FA | 9 |
