= Kabwe (name) =

Kabwe is an African name that may refer to:

== Given name ==
- Kabwe Kamuzati (born 1984), Zambian football player
- Kabwe Kasongo (born 1970), Congolese football player

== Surname ==
- Joseph Kabwe (born 1980), Zimbabwean football player
- Rodrick Kabwe (born 1992), Zambian football midfielder
- Zitto Kabwe (born 1976), Tanzanian politician
