= Gilbert Cassidy Gawing =

Malaysian footballer

Gilbert Cassidy
Personal information
- Full name: Gilbert Cassidy Gawing
- Date of birth: 3 March 1977 (age 49)
- Place of birth: Miri, Sarawak, Malaysia
- Height: 1.64 m (5 ft 4 1/2 in)
- Position: Midfielder

Youth career
- 1996–1997: Sarawak FA
- 1999: Olympic 2000

Senior career*
Years	Team	Apps	(Gls)
1998	Olympic 2000		
2000–2006	Sarawak FA		

International career^{‡}
1997–1998	Malaysia U-21		
1999–2000	Malaysia U-23		
1998–2003	Malaysia	8	(2)
- * Club domestic league appearances and goals as of 31 May 2011 ‡ National team caps and goals as of 29 July 2011

Gilbert Cassidy Gawing (born 3 March 1977) is a Malaysian former professional footballer.

== Club career ==
He played as a midfielder with Sarawak FA in his entire professional career before retiring in 2006. He was also in the Olympic 2000 team that were playing in the Malaysian League for the 1998 season. Gilbert were renowned for his expertise is dead-ball situations such as scoring goals from direct free-kicks.

Gilbert scored the first goal of the newly formed Malaysia Super League in 2004.

== National team ==
Gilbert represented Malaysia 8 times from 1998 to 2003, scoring 2 goals. Early in his career, he was in the Malaysia national under-21 football team that competes in the 1997 FIFA World Youth Championship, held in Malaysia.

== International Senior Goals ==
#	Date	Venue	Opponent	Score	Result	Competition
1.	21 June 2001	Shah Alam Stadium, Malaysia	Bahrain	2-4	Lost	2001 Pestabola Merdeka
2.	8 October 2003	National Stadium, Bukit Jalil, Malaysia	Myanmar	4–0	Win	2004 AFC Asian Cup qualification Group Stage

== Honours ==
=== Club ===
Sarawak FA

- Malaysia FA Cup runner-up: 2001
