= V. Saravanan =

Malaysian footballer

Personal information
- Full name: Saravanan a/l Vellu
- Date of birth: 11 January 1978 (age 48)
- Place of birth: Ipoh, Perak, Malaysia
- Height: 1.73 m (5 ft 8 in)
- Positions: Striker; winger

Team information
- Current team: Perak FC (assistant head coach)

Youth career
- 1997–1998: Perak FA

Senior career*
| Years | Team | Apps | (Gls) |
| 1998–2000 | Perak FA | | |
| 2001 | Kuala Lumpur FA | | |
| 2002–2004 | Perak FA | | |
| 2005–2008 | UPB-MyTeam FC | | |
| 2009 | ATM FA | | |
| 2011 | PKNS FC | | |

International career
| 1997–1998 | Malaysia U21 | | |
| 1999–2000 | Malaysia U23 | | |
| 1999–2004 | Malaysia | 19 | (1) |

Managerial career
- 2012–2022: HJK Helsinki (Youth coach)
- 2023–: Perak FC (assistant head coach)
- * Club domestic league appearances and goals

V. Saravanan (born 11 January 1978) is a former Malaysian football player. He currently works as an assistant coach for Perak FC since 5 January 2023.

== Career ==
Saravanan spent the majority of his football career at Perak FA, winning two Malaysia Cup titles in 1998 and 2000. He also played for Kuala Lumpur FA, UPB-MyTeam FC, ATM FA and PKNS FC.

Saravanan represented Malaysia 19 times from 1999 to 2004. His only international goal was against Thailand in a 2004 friendly match. Early in his career, he was part of the Malaysia U21 that competed in the 1997 FIFA World Youth Championship, held in Malaysia.

He retired from professional football at the end of 2011 to move with his girlfriend to Finland.

In 2021, he obtained his UEFA A Licence and worked as a physical education instructor in Pajulahti, Finland. He is fluent in Finnish, English, Malay and Tamil.

Prior to returning to Malaysia, he was a football coach for HJK in Helsinki, Finland, in 2019, and served IF Gnistan between 2012 and 2018.

== Personal life ==
He married his long-time girlfriend, Satu Johanna Ekholm, a physiotherapist from Finland working with the National Sports Council of Malaysia. They have a son.

== International goals ==
| # | Date | Venue | Opponent | Score | Result | Competition |
|---|---|---|---|---|---|---|
| 1 | 19 August 2004 | Suphachalasai Stadium, Bangkok, Thailand | Thailand | 1–2 | Won | Friendly |
