= Nando Có =

Bissau-Guinean footballer (born 1973)

Personal information
- Full name: Fernando Manuel Có
- Date of birth: 8 October 1973 (age 53)
- Place of birth: Canchungo, Guinea-Bissau
- Height: 1.74 m (5 ft 9 in)
- Position: Forward

Senior career*
Years	Team	Apps	(Gls)
–1996	Arrifanense		
1996–1997	Vitória de Setúbal	17	(3)
1997	Racing Santander	3	(0)
1998	Numancia	15	(1)
1998–1999	Vitória de Setúbal	18	(6)
1999–2000	Toledo	14	(4)
2000–2001	Leça	26	(3)
	Odivelas	1	(0)
2004	Sarawak FA		
2005–2007	FC CeBra 01	38	(15)
2007–2009	FC Sporting Mertzig	46	(17)

International career
1996–2001	Guinea-Bissau	6	(9)
- * Club domestic league appearances and goals

Fernando 'Nando' Có (born 8 October 1973) is a Bissau-Guinean former footballer who played as a forward. Besides Portugal, he has played in Malaysia, Luxembourg, and Spain.

Có was formerly the all-time top scorer for the Guinea-Bisseau national team, with nine goals in six appearances.

== Career ==
In 1997, Có signed for Racing Santander. In 1998, he signed for Numancia.

Signed by Sarawak FA of the Malaysia Super League in 2004 to partner Ghanaian Robert Eshun up front, Manuel Có starred in the club's first win of the season in May, striking a brace to beat Sabah 3–1. Treated as a hero after the match, his first goal was scored off a penalty that game and his second came in the 18th minute that game, allaying players fears of a loss; however, the forward was booked for taking off his shirt after converting the penalty. Shown their third yellow card that season, Manuel Có and Eshun were suspended for one match in August.

== Career statistics ==
=== International ===
Scores and results list Guinea-Bissau's goal tally first.

List of international goals scored by Nando Có
No.	Date	Venue	Opponent	Score	Result	Competition
1	16 June 1996	Stade du 28 Septembre, Conakry, Guinea	Guinea	1–1	1–3	1998 FIFA World Cup qualification
2	7 May 2000	Estádio da Várzea, Praia, Cape Verde	Mali	1–0	2–3	2000 Amílcar Cabral Cup
3	7 May 2000	Estádio da Várzea, Praia, Cape Verde	Mali	2–3	2–3	2000 Amílcar Cabral Cup
4	3 November 2001	Stade du 26 Mars, Bamako, Mali	Benin		7–2	2001 Amílcar Cabral Cup
5	3 November 2001	Stade du 26 Mars, Bamako, Mali	Benin		7–2	2001 Amílcar Cabral Cup
6	3 November 2001	Stade du 26 Mars, Bamako, Mali	Benin		7–2	2001 Amílcar Cabral Cup
7	3 November 2001	Stade du 26 Mars, Bamako, Mali	Benin		7–2	2001 Amílcar Cabral Cup
8	3 November 2001	Stade du 26 Mars, Bamako, Mali	Benin		7–2	2001 Amílcar Cabral Cup
9	7 November 2001	Stade Amari Daou, Ségou, Mali	Mauritania	1–0	1–0	2001 Amílcar Cabral Cup
