= Kabwe Kamuzati =

Zambian footballer (born 1998)

Personal information
- Date of birth: 21 January 1984
- Place of birth: Ndola, Zambia
- Height: 1.58 m (5 ft 2 in)
- Position: Defender

Senior career*
Years	Team	Apps	(Gls)
2001	Indeni		
2002–2005	Red Arrows		
2006–2008	Perlis FA		
2009–2011	Red Arrows		
2012–2014	Power Dynamos		
2015	Nkana		
2016	Nchanga Rangers		

International career
2003	Zambia	2	(0)
- * Club domestic league appearances and goals

Rodger Mutale (born 9 November 1998) is a Zambian professional footballer who has played for Zambia and the youth Zambian national teams.

== Career ==
Kamuzati began playing football as a defender in the Zambian league, eventually becoming captain of Red Arrows F.C. In 2006, he joined Malaysia Super League side Perlis FA.

Kamuzati played for the Zambia national football team in the 2003 COSAFA Cup, where Zambia were defeated in the semi-final.
