= Azlan Ismail =

Malaysian footballer

Personal information
- Full name: Mohd Azlan bin Ismail
- Date of birth: 3 October 1984 (age 42)
- Place of birth: Tumpat, Kelantan, Malaysia
- Height: 1.78 m (5 ft 10 in)
- Position: Forward

Team information
- Current team: T–Team
- Number: 7

Youth career
- 2003–2004: Kelantan FA President Cup

Senior career*
Years	Team	Apps	(Gls)
2005	Kelantan	28	(15)
2006–2007	Perlis	24	(13)
2008	PDRM	10	(5)
2009	Terengganu	22	(12)
2010–2011	Kedah	17	(10)
2011–2012	Kelantan	9	(1)
2012–2013	Perak	17	(3)
2014–	T–Team	0	(0)

International career
2007	Malaysia	2	(1)
- * Club domestic league appearances and goals as of 2 December 2013

Azlan Ismail (born 3 October 1984, in Tumpat, Kelantan) is a Malaysian footballer currently playing as a forward for T–Team in Malaysia Super League. He is a former Malaysia national football team player.

== Career ==
Azlan was the first player to score a hat-trick in the 2010 season of the Malaysian Super League. At the beginning of February 2010, he was the league's top scorer.
