= Vyacheslav Melnikov (footballer, born 1975) =

Russian footballer

Vyacheslav Melnikov Вячеслав Мельников
Personal information
- Date of birth: 12 March 1975 (age 51)
- Height: 1.80 m (5 ft 11 in)
- Position: Striker

Senior career*
Years	Team	Apps	(Gls)
1991–1992	FC Gekris Novorossiysk	10	(0)
1992–1994	PFC CSKA-d Moscow	65	(46)
1994	PFC CSKA Moscow	1	(0)
1994–1995	Hapoel Haifa F.C.	13	(4)
1995	PFC CSKA-d Moscow	12	(5)
1995	Ironi Rishon leZion	8	(1)
1996	Hapoel Beit She'an F.C.	12	(5)
1996–1997	Hapoel Bat Yam F.C.	18	(3)
1997–1998	Ankaragücü	10	(2)
1998	Pahang FA	32	(17)
2001–2002	Happy Valley AA	3	(3)
2002	Pahang FA	30	(13)
2004–2005	Penang FA	26	(18)
2007	Đồng Tháp F.C.	0	(0)
Total		240	(117)
- * Club domestic league appearances and goals

Vyacheslav Melnikov (Russian: Вячеслав Мельников; born 12 March 1975) is a retired Russian professional footballer.

== Honours ==
=== Individual ===
- Malaysia Super League Top goalscorer: 1998
