= Jon Angelucci =

Australian football player

Personal information
- Full name: Jonathon Ben Angelucci
- Date of birth: 12 September 1975 (age 51)
- Place of birth: Wollongong, Australia
- Position: Striker

Youth career
- Wollongong City
- AIS

Senior career*
Years	Team	Apps	(Gls)
1993–1996	Marconi Stallions	9	(1)
1997–1999	Blacktown City		
1999–2000	Parramatta Power	22	(5)
2000–2001	Canberra Cosmos	25	(7)
2001–2003	Sydney United	15	(3)
2003	Johor FC		
2004	Singapore Armed Forces	25	(13)
2005	Woodlands Wellington	24	(18)
2006–2007	Sengkang Punggol	53	(13)
2009–2010	HKFC	13	(10)
- * Club domestic league appearances and goals as of 16:49, 3 June 2010 (UTC)

Jon Angelucci (born 12 September 1975) is an Australian association football player.

Awards and achievements
Preceded by Unknown	Singapore Cup top scorer 2005	Succeeded by Kengne Ludovick
