= Perlis FA State Football Team =

Malaysian football club

Perlis FA
- Full name: Perlis Football Association
- Nickname: Singa Utara (The Northern Lions)
- Founded: 1963; 63 years ago
- Dissolved: 2019
- Ground: Tuanku Syed Putra Stadium
- Capacity: 20,000
- Owner: Perlis Football Association
- League: Malaysia Premier League
- 2019: Disqualified
Home colours	Away colours	Third colours

Perlis FA State Football Team (Malay: Pasukan Bola Sepak Negeri Perlis), also known as Perlis FA, was a football team based in Kangar, Perlis, run and managed by the Perlis Football Association (PFA). The team was founded in 1963.

It was one of the 14 state teams of the Malaysian football structure, before the Malaysian football league demanded all teams competing in the country's top two leagues to be run as professional clubs by 2021. Perlis FA was funded and run by a state football association that relied mostly on state government grants. There were plans to privatize the team after Ahmad Amizal Shaifit Ahmad was elected PFA president in 2018, but the move did not materialise because the association fell into financial crisis the following year. Their participation in the Malaysian football league was subsequently cancelled.

== History ==
The team had a long-standing rivalry with Kedah FA, the two northern teams collectively known as the "Northern Derby". Their home was the 20,000-seat Tuanku Syed Putra Stadium, built in 1995 to replace the Dato' Sheikh Ahmad Stadium. Perlis had their first major success in the 2004 season, when they won the Malaysia Cup. They went on to win the Malaysian top-tier league, the Malaysian Super League, in 2005. They won another Malaysia Cup in 2006. In the Malaysia FA Cup, they were beaten finalist three times, in 2003, 2006 and 2007. The team had also won the Malaysian Charity Shield, also known as the Piala Sumbangsih, in 2007 and 2008. As for continental tournaments, 2006 was their debut playing in the AFC Cup. They did qualify for the 2010 edition of the AFC Cup, but withdrew from the competition.

=== Shahidan Kassim era ===
Perlis FA's most successful era was during the time when Shahidan Kassim was president of the Perlis Football Association (PFA) from 1998 to 2013. His tenure as PFA president ended after the team has been struggling financially. The team served a two-year FIFA suspension for failing to settle salary arrears of players and coaches in 2019.

== Stadium ==
Tuanku Syed Putra Stadium
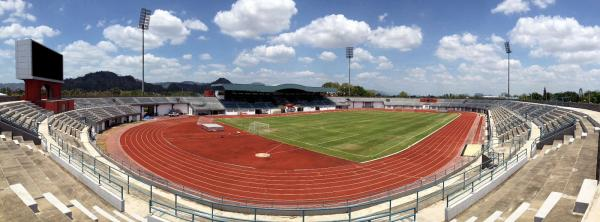
- Former names: Stadium Utama, Kangar
- Location: Kangar, Perlis, Malaysia
- Owner: Perlis State
- Capacity: 20,000

Construction
- Groundbreaking: 1994
- Opened: 1995

Tenant
- Perlis FA (1995–2019)

== Crest and colours ==
Perlis played their home matches wearing primarily yellow shirts, which sometimes had touch of blue colour. The colours for the kit were inspired by the colours of the Malaysian state of Perlis flag, which is yellow and blue.

== Supporters ==
The Perlis FA state team had supporters' group known as the Ultras Perlis – Brigate Gialloblu (BGB Perlis) which was established in 2011. When attending matches played by Perlis FA, the group could be recognised by their black outfits while sporting yellow and blue scarfs.

== Kit manufacturers and shirt sponsors ==
Period	Kit Manufacturer	Main sponsor	Other sponsors
1995	(Italy) Lotto	Dunhill	None
1996	(Italy) Kronos	Dunhill	None
1997	(Germany) Adidas	Dunhill	None
1998	(Germany) Adidas	Dunhill	DSSK
1999	(Italy) Lotto	Dunhill	DSSK
2000	(Germany) Adidas	Dunhill	DSSK
2001	(Germany) Puma	Dunhill	DSSK
2002	(Italy) Diadora	Dunhill	DSSK
2003	(United Kingdom) Admiral	Dunhill	DSSK
2004	(United Kingdom) Admiral	Dunhill	DSSK
2005	(Spain) Joma	Telekom Malaysia	Bintong Construction
2006	(Italy) Kappa	Telekom Malaysia	Bintong Construction
2007	(Italy) Diadora	Telekom Malaysia	DSSK
2008	(South Korea) KIKA	Telekom Malaysia	Troyten
2009	(South Korea) KIKA	Telekom Malaysia	DSSK
2010	(South Korea) KIKA	Telekom Malaysia	Yayasan Pok dan Kassim
2011	(South Korea) KIKA	ASTRO	Yayasan Pok dan Kassim
2012	(Singapore) Kubba	ASTRO	Yayasan Pok dan Kassim
2013	(Malaysia) Warriors	ASTRO	Warriors
2014	(Thailand) FBT	ASTRO	Canggih
2015	(Malaysia) Carino	Carino	FG Footwear
2016	(Malaysia) Carino	Carino	MaraLiner
2017	(Malaysia) Carino	Daily Fresco	Hotel Ban Cheong
2018–2019	(Malaysia) SkyHawk	Yonhin (Perlis) Sdn. Bhd.	FG Footwear

== Players (2019) ==
=== First-team squad ===
Note: Flags indicate national team as defined under FIFA eligibility rules; some limited exceptions apply. Players may hold more than one non-FIFA nationality.

No.	Pos.	Nation	Player
1	GK	MAS	Amran Omar
2	DF	MAS	Madzalan Emoi
3	DF	MAS	Fauzi Nan
4	DF	ZAM	Kabwe Kamuzati
5	MF	MAS	Adrien Jurad Chamrong
6	MF	MAS	Mandzoor Azwira
7	MF	MAS	Azlan Ismail
8	MF	BRA	Joao Bandoch
9	FW	SLE	Lamin Conteh Al-Hidayah
10	FW	ZAM	Phillimon Chipeta
11	FW	MAS	Nizaruddin Yussof
12	GK	MAS	Tay Sin Kiat
13	DF	MAS	Azizi Mat Rose

No.	Pos.	Nation	Player
15	DF	MAS	Feriza Ismail
16	FW	ZAM	Zacharia Simukonda
17	MF	MAS	Nazaruddin Zain
18	DF	MAS	Shariman Che Omar
19	MF	MAS	Effendi Malek
20	FW	MAS	Yusri Che Lah
21	MF	MAS	Ivan Yussof
22	GK	MAS	Zainal Rabin

=== U-19 team ===
Note: Flags indicate national team as defined under FIFA eligibility rules; some limited exceptions apply. Players may hold more than one non-FIFA nationality.

No.	Pos.	Nation	Player
1	GK	MAS	Afif Nadzri
2	DF	MAS	Aiman Yusoff
3	DF	MAS	Haziq Akmal
4	DF	MAS	Iskandar Ismail
5	DF	MAS	Nusyamin Jusoh
6	MF	MAS	Azeem Roslan
7	MF	MAS	Faiz Saffuan
8	MF	MAS	Imran Azizi
9	MF	MAS	Tengku Fikri
10	FW	MAS	Aliff Najmie
11	MF	MAS	Izzat Taufeq
12	DF	MAS	Ikhmal Mansor
13	MF	MAS	Danial Abdullah
14	MF	MAS	Syafiq Harith

No.	Pos.	Nation	Player
15	DF	MAS	Kamal Arif
16	MF	MAS	Navitha JR a/l Kla Chang
17	MF	MAS	Harith Izzudin
18	DF	MAS	Fauzan Fazil
19	GK	MAS	Alif Fahmi
20	FW	MAS	Izdyhar Ehsan
21	DF	MAS	Haiqal Noh
22	GK	MAS	Annil Hakim
23	MF	MAS	Aidil Ezraf
24	MF	MAS	Somsak a/l Sayri
25	MF	MAS	Faiz Nazri
26	DF	MAS	Akhil Asyraf
27	MF	MAS	Uwais Hazisukino

== Honours ==
=== Domestic competitions ===
==== League ====
- Division 1/Semi-Pro League 1/Liga Perdana/Premier League 1/Super League

- Winners (1): 2005
- Runners-up (1): 2009
- Third place (2): 2003, 2004

- Division 2/Semi-Pro League 2/Premier League 2/Premier League

- Winners (1): 1989

- Division 3/FAM League

- Runners-up (1): 2015

==== Cups ====
- Malaysia Cup

- Winners (2): 2004, 2006
- Runners-up (1): 2005

- Malaysia FA Cup

- Runners-up (3): 2003, 2006, 2007

- Piala Sumbangsih

- Winners (2): 2007, 2008
- Runners-up (1): 2005

=== Friendly international ===
- Scissors Cup (India)

- Runners-up (1): 1995

== Club records ==
Updated 29 November 2018
*Note :

- P = Played, W = Win, D = Draw, L= Loss, F = Goal for, A = Goal against, D = Goal difference, Pts = Points, Pos = Position

1st or Champions 2nd or Runner-up 3rd place Promotion Relegation

Season	League										Cup			Other		Asia	
Season	Division	Pld	W	D	L	F	A	D	Pts	Pos	Charity	Malaysia	FA	Other		Competition	Result
1995	Liga Premier	28	9	5	14	37	46	-9	32	10th	–	Group stage	1st round	4th Scissors cup	Runner-up	–	–
1996	Liga Premier	28	10	6	12	30	29	+1	36	10th	–	Group stage	2nd round	–	–	–	–
1997	Liga Premier	28	13	6	9	42	36	+6	45	6th	–	Semi-finals	2nd round	–	–	–	–
1998	Premier 1	22	7	4	11	33	39	-6	25	11th	–	Not qualified	2nd round	–	–	–	–
1999	Premier 2	18	9	2	7	36	26	+10	31	4th	–	Group stage	2nd round	–	–	–	–
2000	Premier 1	22	6	7	9	24	27	-3	25	9th	–	Group stage	1st round	–	–	–	–
2001	Premier 1	22	9	4	9	31	31	+0	31	6th	–	Quarter-finals	2nd round	–	–	–	–
2002	Premier 1	26	11	8	7	31	23	+9	41	7th	–	Group stage	1st round	–	–	–	–
2003	Premier 1	24	13	6	5	40	23	+17	45	3rd	–	Semi-finals	Runner-up	–	–	–	–
2004	Super League	21	10	6	5	41	30	+11	36	3rd	–	Champions	3rd round	–	–	–	–
2005	Super League	21	14	3	4	43	19	+24	45	1st	Runner-up	Runner-up	2nd round	–	–	–	–
2005–06	Super League	21	8	6	7	26	25	+1	30	4th	–	Champions	Runner-up	–	–	AFC Cup	Group stage
2006–07	Super League	24	13	4	7	47	25	+22	43	5th	Champions	Quarter-finals	Runner-up	–	–	–	–
2007–08	Super League	24	10	6	8	36	25	+11	36	7th	Champions	Quarter-finals	1st round	–	–	–	–
2009	Super League	26	17	5	4	40	19	+21	56	2nd	–	Semi-finals	Semi-finals	–	–	–	–
2010	Super League	26	8	5	13	32	35	-3	29	12th	–	Quarter-finals	1st round	–	–	–	–
2011	Super League	26	2	4	20	20	61	-41	10	14th	–	Not qualified	1st round	–	–	–	–
2012	Liga Premier	22	4	3	15	38	68	-30	15	11th	–	Not qualified	2nd round	–	–	–	–
2013	Liga Premier	22	6	4	12	27	42	-15	22	10th	–	Not qualified	1st round	–	–	–	–
2014	Liga Premier	22	2	6	14	21	50	-29	12	11th	–	Not qualified	2nd round	–	–	–	–
2015	FAM League	18	12	6	0	33	10	+23	42	1st	–	Not qualified	1st round	–	–	–	–
2016	Liga Premier	22	10	4	8	38	32	+6	34	6th	–	Not qualified	3rd round	–	–	–	–
2017	Liga Premier	22	4	3	15	22	55	−33	12	12th	–	Not qualified	3rd round	–	–	–	–
2018	FAM League	8	1	1	6	5	14	−9	4	5th	–	Not qualified	2nd round	–	–	–	–
2019	Liga Premier	x	x	x	x	x	x	x	x	Suspended	–	Not qualified	Disqualify	–	–	–	–

== Individual player awards ==
=== M-League Golden boot winners ===
Season	Player	Goals
2003	(Zambia) Phillimon Chepita	23
2005	(Zambia) Zacharia Simukonda	18
2009	(Malaysia) Mohd Nizaruddin Yusof	18

=== M-League top goalscorer ===
Season	Player	Goals
1995	(Uzbekistan) Rustam Abdullaev	11
2003	(Zambia) Phillimon Chepita	23
2004	(Zambia) Phillimon Chepita	9
2004	(Malaysia) Yusri Che Lah	9
2005	(Zambia) Zacharia Simukonda	18
2005–06	(Zambia) Phillimon Chepita	13
2006–07	(Zambia) Phillimon Chepita	13
2006–07	(Malaysia) Azlan Ismail	13
2007–08	(Zambia) Phillimon Chepita	13
2009	(Malaysia) Mohd Nizaruddin Yusof	18
2010	(Malaysia) Ahmad Fakri Saarani	5
2011	(Malaysia) Rizal Ghazali	5
2012	(Sierra Leone) Lamin Conteh	8
2013	(Malaysia) Badrul Hisani Abd Rahman	6
2014	(Ivory Coast) Dao Bakary	8
2015	(Malaysia) Mohd Shafiq Azmi	14
2016	(Brazil) Charles Chad	7
2017	(England) Brandon Adams	6
2018	(Malaysia) Norhamizaree Hamid	6

== Presidents ==
Years	Name
1998–2013	Shahidan Kassim
2013–2017	Rozabil Abdul Rahman
2017–2018	Shaharuddin Ismail
2018–2019	Amizal Shaifit Ahmad Rafie
2019	Zainuddin Osman

== Managerial history ==
Managers by years (2008–2019)

Years	Name
2008–2009	(Malaysia) Dato' Ismail Kassim
2009–2010	(Malaysia) Mohd Noor Aziz
2010–2012	(Malaysia) Azahar Ahmad
2013–2014	(Malaysia) Shahruddin Ismail
2015–2017	(Malaysia) Afifi Osman
2018–2019	(Malaysia) Zailuddin Ariffin

== Coaching history ==
Head coaches by Years (1985–2019)

Years	Name
1985–1989	(Malaysia) Mohd Mohayudin Rosli
1994–1996	(Slovakia) Joseph Herel
1996	(Malaysia) Bakri Ibni
1997–2000	(Malaysia) Abdul Rahman Ibrahim
2001	(Malaysia) Salim Tofel Mohamad
2001–2002	(Malaysia) Tajuddin Noor
2003–2005	(Malaysia) Norizan Bakar
2005–2007	(Malaysia) Abdul Rahman Ibrahim
2007–2009	(Malaysia) Irfan Bakti Abu Salim
2010	(Malaysia) Muhammad Nidzam Adzha Yusoff
2010	(Malaysia) Ahmad Yunus Mohd Alif
2011	(Malaysia) Moshtakeen Omar
March 2011 – April 2011	(Malaysia) Salim Tofel Mohamad (caretaker)
April 2011 – October 2011	(Hungary) Jánós Krécská
June 2012 – December 2012	(Malaysia) Robert Scully
December 2012 – November 2013	(Malaysia) Ahmad Yunus Mohd Alif
December 2013 – June 2014	(Malaysia) Reduan Abdullah
December 2014 – October 2015	(Malaysia) Yusri Che Lah
November 2015	(Malaysia) Dollah Salleh
December 2016 – March 2017	(Malaysia) Razip Ismail
March 2017 – November 2017	(Malaysia) Syamsul Saad
December 2017 – December 2018	(Malaysia) Manja Man
December 2018 – 2019	(Malaysia) Manzoor Azwira
