= Robert Eshun =

Ghanaian footballer (1974–2023)

Personal information
- Date of birth: 19 December 1974
- Place of birth: Accra, Ghana
- Date of death: 23 October 2023 (aged 48)
- Place of death: London, England
- Height: 1.76 m (5 ft 9 in)
- Position: Winger

Senior career*
Years	Team	Apps	(Gls)
- Asante Kotoko
1992–1993	Turnhout		
1993–1997	Tielen		
1997–1999	Lommel	60	(13)
1999–2001	Gaziantepspor	12	(1)
2001–2003	Dessel		
2003	Sarawak FA		
Total		+72	(+14)
- * Club domestic league appearances and goals

Robert Eshun (19 December 1974 – 23 October 2023) was a Ghanaian professional footballer who played as a winger.

== Career ==
Eshun began his career with Asante Kotoko, scoring in the final of the 1990 FA Cup. He also played in Belgium for Turnhout, Tielen, Lommel and Dessel. He later played in Turkey for Gaziantepspor, and in Malaysia for Sarawak FA.

== Death ==
Robert Eshun died from a cardiac arrest in London, on 23 October 2023, at the age of 48.
