= Ivan Žiga =

Slovak footballer

Personal information
- Full name: Ivan Žiga
- Date of birth: 21 August 1972 (age 54)
- Place of birth: Czechoslovakia
- Height: 1.80 m (5 ft 11 in)
- Position: Midfielder

Team information
- Current team: Kremser SC

Senior career*
Years	Team	Apps	(Gls)
1991–1992	SK Slovan Bratislava		
2003–2004	MK Land FC		
2004–2005	Public Bank FC		
2005–2006	Malacca FA		
2006	Sarawak FA		
2006–	Kremser SC		

International career^{‡}
- Slovakia U21
- * Club domestic league appearances and goals as of 9 August 2007 ‡ National team caps and goals as of 9 August 2007

Ivan Žiga (born 21 August 1972) is a Slovak footballer. He currently plays for Kremser SC in the 2. HNL.
