= Public Bank F.C. =

Malaysian football club

Public Bank
- Full name: Public Bank Football Club
- Nickname(s): The Bankers; No Bankers (after withdraw)
- Founded: 2003; 22 years ago
- Dissolved: 2006; 19 years ago
- Ground: Majlis Perbandaran Selayang Stadium, Selayang, Selangor
- Capacity: 10,000
Home colours	Away colours

Public Bank Football Club or Public Bank FC was a football club from Malaysia, based in Selayang, Selangor. The club home ground was the Majlis Perbandaran Selayang Stadium. The club formerly play in Malaysia Super League before pulled from the league after the end of 2005 season.

== History ==
Public Bank Football Club was owned by Public Bank Berhad. The club managed to win the Malaysia Premier League 2 title in 2003 and was promoted to the newly formed top division, the Malaysia Super League for 2004 season.

The club competed in the top division for two years, the 2004 and 2005 season. In their first season in the Super League, the club finished runners-up to Pahang. However, in the following year, the club finished 7th out of 8 clubs and were to be relegated to the second division, the Premier League.

At the end of 2005 season, the club decided to withdraw from the Malaysian League, citing financial difficulties. As a result, the club were then banned from entering all competitions organised by the Football Association of Malaysia (FAM) for 5 years.

== Honours ==
- Malaysia Premier League 2
  - Winners (1): 2003
- Malaysia Super League
  - Runners-up (1): 2004

== Coaches ==
Period	Coach
2002–05	(Malaysia) E. Elavarasan

== See also ==
- Public Bank Berhad
