= Phillimon Chepita =

Zambian footballer (born 1981)

Personal information
- Full name: Phillimon Chepita
- Date of birth: 2 February 1981 (age 45)
- Place of birth: Zambia
- Position: Striker

Senior career*
Years	Team	Apps	(Gls)
2000–2003	Lusaka Dynamos		
2003–2008	Perlis FA		
2008–2009	Persib Bandung		
2009–2011	Al Jaish		
2012	PKNS FC		

International career
2000–2002	Zambia	5	(1)
- * Club domestic league appearances and goals

Philimon Chipeta (born 2 February 1981), sometimes spelled Philimon Chepita is a Zambian football striker who is currently unattached.

Formerly he played for PKNS FC in the 2012 Malaysia Super League on a short-term contract to replace Michaël Niçoise who is out through injury. He played 4 times for the club, scoring no goals.

Chepita previous stint in Malaysia was with Perlis FA, where he helped them win Malaysia Cup in 2004 and 2006, and also 2005 Super League Malaysia title. In his first season with Perlis, he also claimed the top goalscorer title with 23 goals.

He also played in Indonesia, Syria as well as his native Zambia.

He was part of the Zambian African Nations Cup teams in 2002.
