= Frank Seator =

Liberian footballer (1975–2013)

Personal information
- Full name: Frank Jean Seator
- Date of birth: 24 October 1975
- Place of birth: Liberia
- Date of death: 12 February 2013 (aged 37)
- Place of death: Harbel, Liberia
- Height: 1.75 m (5 ft 9 in)
- Position: Striker

Senior career*
| Years | Team | Apps | (Gls) |
| 1995–1996 | Videoton FC | 15 | (8) |
| 1996–1997 | Al-Wakrah SC | 19 | (14) |
| 1997–1998 | Degerfors IF | 14 | (12) |
| 1998–1999 | Al-Ittihad | 16 | (13) |
| 1999–2000 | Al-Arabi SC | 7 | (9) |
| 2000–2001 | Al-Rayyan SC | 14 | (12) |
| 2001–2002 | Al-Khor SC | 13 | (10) |
| 2002–2003 | Espérance Tunis | 28 | (13) |
| 2003–2005 | Perak | 42 | (24) |
| 2005–2006 | PSMS Medan | 22 | (7) |
| 2006–2007 | Persija Jakarta | 15 | (3) |
| 2007–2008 | Sriwijaya FC | 26 | (6) |
| 2008–2009 | Persis Solo | 35 | (10) |
| 2009–2010 | Selangor | 16 | (3) |
| 2010–2011 | Persikabo Bogor | 18 | (6) |
| 2011–2012 | Al Oruba Sur | 22 | (9) |

International career
| 2000–2008 | Liberia | 15 | (5) |
- * Club domestic league appearances and goals

Frank Jean Seator (24 October 1975 – 12 February 2013) was a Liberian professional footballer who played as a striker. He spent most of his football career in Asia.

== Club career ==
Seator joined Tunisian club Espérance in 2002. He also played for clubs in Qatar, Kuwait, Saudi Arabia, Hungary and Sweden. In 2005, Seator played with Perak FA in Malaysia, and became a popular player with the fans (whom nicknamed him "Booker T", after the WWE wrestler). He scored 64 goals in all competition within only two and a half seasons. He also played for Indonesian side Persis Solo and Indian I-League club Salgaocar.He also played in PSMS-Medan and won one trophy with PSMS in the Bang Yos Gold Cup.

== International career ==
Seator was a long-time member of the Liberia national team. He was a member of the 2002 African Cup of Nations Liberia squad. He was also part of the Liberian squad qualifying for the 2008 African Cup of Nations.

== Death ==
Seator died on 12 February 2013 at the Firestone Medical Hospital in Harbel, Liberia.
