= 2002 Kuala Lumpur FA season =

Kuala Lumpur competed in the Premier 1 and FA Cup in season 2002. They finished 13th in the league and were relegated for the first time in their history and failed to qualify for the Malaysia Cup for the first time since 1996. Iraqi Wathiq Naji Jassim was removed as coach after the first match of the season and was replaced by Lim Kim Lian. Nigerian striker Onyema Ikechukwu played only two matches before having his contract terminated after failing to recover from a hamstring injury. Kuala Lumpur FA is a Malaysian professional football club founded in 1974.

== Results and fixtures ==
Note: scores are written KL first.

Date	Venue	Opponents	Score	Competition	KL scorers
January 26, 2002	Utama Stadium, Kangar	Perlis	1-4	Premier 1	Nazreen Tee Abdullah
February 2, 2002	KLFA Stadium, Cheras	Chempaka FC	1-0	Premier 1	Liew Kim Tu
February 5, 2002	KLFA Stadium, Cheras	Thang Khiang Nam FC	1-1	FA Cup Rd 1	S Saravanan
February 9, 2002	Darulmakmur Stadium, Kuantan	Pahang	1-1	Premier 1	Nazreen Tee Abdullah
February 16, 2002	KLFA Stadium, Cheras	Sabah	1-3	Premier 1	Farid Dewan
February 19, 2002	JCorp Stadium, Pasir Gudang	Johor FC	1-2	Premier 1	Yap Wai Loon
February 26, 2002	KLFA Stadium, Cheras	Terengganu FA	0-1	Premier 1	
March 2, 2002	Shah Alam Stadium	Selangor	0-2	Premier 1	
March 5, 2002	Perak Stadium, Ipoh	Thang Khiang Nam FC	1-1 (aet, pen:4-1)	FA Cup Rd 1	Ahmad Faisal Othman
March 9, 2002	KLFA Stadium, Cheras	Perak	2-0	Premier 1	Farid Dewan, Zulkifli Afendi Zakri
March 19, 2002	Batu Kawan Stadium	Penang	0-1	Premier 1	
March 23, 2002	KLFA Stadium, Cheras	Sarawak	1-3	Premier 1	Farid Dewan
March 26, 2002	Tuanku Abdul Rahman Stadium, Paroi	Negeri Sembilan	2-2	Premier 1	Chris Dawson, Own goal
April 2, 2002	KLFA Stadium, Cheras	Malacca	1-2	Premier 1	Chris Dawson
April 6, 2002	KLFA Stadium, Cheras	Kelantan	1-3	Premier 1	Roslisham Mohd Nor
April 9, 2002	KLFA Stadium, Cheras	Perak	1-3	FA Cup Rd 2	Chris Dawson
April 13, 2002	Sultan Muhd IV Stadium, Kota Baru	Kelantan	1-2	Premier 1	Roslisham Mohd Nor
April 20, 2002	KLFA Stadium, Cheras	Perlis	2-2	Premier 1	Farid Dewan, Roslisham Mohd Nor
April 23, 2002	Perak Stadium, Ipoh	Perak	1-2	FA Cup Rd 2	Roslisham Mohd Nor
April 30, 2002	Tuanku Abdul Rahman Stadium, Paroi	Chempaka FC	0-0	Premier 1	
May 4, 2002	KLFA Stadium, Cheras	Pahang	2-0	Premier 1	Roslisham Mohd Nor (2)
May 11, 2002	Penampang Stadium	Sabah	1-2	Premier 1	Nazreen Tee Abdullah
May 28, 2002	KLFA Stadium, Cheras	Johor FC	1-2	Premier 1	Liew Kim Tu
June 8, 2002	Sultan Ismail Nasirudin Shah Stadium, Kuala Terengganu	Terengganu	0-3	Premier 1	
June 15, 2002	KLFA Stadium, Cheras	Selangor	1-3	Premier 1	Ridzuan Abu Shah
June 18, 2002	Perak Stadium, Ipoh	Perak	0-2	Premier 1	
June 22, 2002	KLFA Stadium, Cheras	Penang	0-2	Premier 1	
June 29, 2002	Sarawak Stadium, Kuching	Sarawak	0-4	Premier 1	
July 2, 2002	KLFA Stadium, Cheras	Negeri Sembilan	1-0	Premier 1	Norzul Azuan Yunus
July 9, 2002	Hang Tuah Stadium, Malacca	Malacca	0-2	Premier 1	

== Tables ==
=== Malaysian Premier 1 ===
Pos	Team	Pld	W	D	L	GF	GA	GD	Pts	Qualification or relegation
10	Kelantan FA	26	9	3	14	29	41	−12	30	
11	Malacca FA	26	8	3	15	28	48	−20	27	
12	NS Chempaka FC	26	4	7	15	21	50	−29	19	Withdrew from Liga Perdana 1 and dissolved.
13	Kuala Lumpur FA	26	4	4	18	21	48	−27	16	Relegated to Liga Perdana 2
14	Negeri Sembilan FA	26	4	4	18	25	61	−36	16	Relegated to Liga Perdana 2

Source: rsssf.com

== Scorers ==
Player	League	FA Cup	Total
(Malaysia) Roslisham Mohd Noor	5	1	6
(Malaysia) Farid Dewan	4	0	4
(Malaysia) Nazreen Tee Abdullah	3	0	3
(England) Chris Dawson	2	1	3
(Malaysia) Liew Kim Tu	2	0	2
(Malaysia) Norzul Azuan Yunus	1	0	1
(Malaysia) Ridzuan Abu Shah	1	0	1
(Malaysia) Yap Wai Loon	1	0	1
(Malaysia) Zulkifli Affendi Zakri	1	0	1
(Malaysia) Ahmad Faisal Othman	0	1	1
(Malaysia) S Saravanan	0	1	1
(Malaysia) Azralan Azmi	0	0	0
(Malaysia) Chua Eng Kui	0	0	0
(Malaysia) Faizal Desa	0	0	0
(Malaysia) Hafiz Rumi (GK)	0	0	0
(Malaysia) Khairi Zainuddin	0	0	0
(Malaysia) Lai Weng Hun	0	0	0
(Malaysia) M Eswaran	0	0	0
(Malaysia) M Subramaniam	0	0	0
(Nigeria) Onyema Ikechukwu	0	0	0
(Malaysia) Razi Effendi Suhit (GK)	0	0	0
(Malaysia) Shahruddin Ahmad Mokshinon (GK)	0	0	0
(Malaysia) Nik Ahmad Fadly Nik Leh	0	0	0
(Malaysia) Rahim Salam	0	0	0
Own goal	1	0	1
