= List of Kelantan FA managers =

Kelantan Football Association is a Malaysian professional football team based in Kota Bharu, Kelantan. The team was formed in 1946 as Kelantan Amateur Football Association. They are currently compete in Malaysia Super League.

The most successful person to manage Kelantan FA is Haji Azman Ibrahim, who won 2 Malaysia Super League titles, 2 FA Cups, 2 Malaysia Cups and 1 Charity Shield in his managerial since 2009.

== Managerial history ==
Manager by Years (1991–present)

Name	Nationality	Years	Notes
Yusoff Ali	Malaysia	1991	
Zulkifle Wan Yusoff	Malaysia	1994	
Muhammad Zulhakimie	Malaysia	1998	
Wan Hashim Wan Daud	Malaysia	1998–2002	
Azman Ibrahim	Malaysia	2005	
Ahmad Jazlan Yaakub	Malaysia	2006–2008	
Peter James Butler	England	2009	First foreign manager
Azman Ibrahim	Malaysia	2009–13 November 2012	
Bojan Hodak	Croatia	13 November 2013–16 February 2013	Second foreign manager
Azman Ibrahim	Malaysia	17 February 2013–14 November 2015	
K. Devan	Malaysia	5 December 2015 – 12 May 2016	
Velizar Popov	Bulgaria	12 May 2016 – 12 July 2016	Third foreign manager
Wan Badri Wan Omar	Malaysia	12 July 2016 – 31 December 2016	
Rosmadi Ismail	Malaysia	1 January 2017 – 17 June 2017	
Alfredo Gonzales	Uruguay	17 June 2017 – 20 July 2017	Fourth foreign manager
Afandi Hamzah	Malaysia	20 July 2017–present	
