= 2001 Liga Perdana 1 =

- Season: 2001
- Champions: Penang; 2nd Premier League One title 3rd Liga M title
- Relegated: Johor
- 2000-01: Penang (group stage)
- Matches played: 132

The 2001 Liga Perdana 1 season is the fourth season of Liga Perdana 1. A total of 12 teams participated in the season.

The season kicked off on March 31, 2001. Penang dominated the season and ended up winning the title.

== Teams ==
A total of 12 teams participated in the 2001 Liga Perdana 1 season. 12 teams competing in the fourth season of Liga Perdana 1. Malacca and Kelantan were promoted while Sabah and Brunei were relegated to Liga Perdana 2.

- Selangor FA (2000 Liga Perdana 1 champions)
- Penang FA
- Perak FA
- Terengganu FA
- Sarawak FA
- Negeri Sembilan FA
- Pahang FA
- Kuala Lumpur FA
- Perlis FA
- Johor FC
- Kelantan FA (Promoted as 2000 Liga Perdana 2 champions)
- Malacca FA (Promoted as 2000 Liga Perdana 2 runner-up)

== League table ==
Pos	Team	Pld	W	D	L	GF	GA	GD	Pts	Qualification or relegation
1	Penang FA	22	15	5	2	45	14	+31	50	Champion
2	Terengganu FA	22	12	5	5	37	20	+17	41	
3	Kelantan FA	22	11	5	6	33	21	+12	38	
4	Selangor FA	22	8	10	4	36	22	+14	34	
5	Pahang FA	22	9	5	8	34	29	+5	32	
6	Perlis FA	22	9	4	9	31	21	+10	31	
7	Perak FA	22	8	5	9	38	34	+4	29	
8	Negeri Sembilan FA	22	7	6	9	32	39	−7	27	
9	Sarawak FA	22	5	9	8	19	26	−7	24	
10	Kuala Lumpur FA	22	5	8	9	19	34	−15	23	
11	Malacca FA	22	6	4	12	25	38	−13	22	
12	Johor FA	22	2	4	16	13	54	−41	10	Relegated to Liga Perdana 2

== Champions ==
2001 Liga Perdana 1 winner
Penang
2nd title
