= Azman Ibrahim =

Azman Ibrahim may refer to:

- Azman Ibrahim (football manager) (born 1960), Malaysian football manager
- Azman Ibrahim (politician), Malaysian politician
