= Tiger Rovers F.C =

Malaysian football club

- Full name: Tiger Rovers Football Club
- Nickname: Tygo
- Founded: 2014; 12 years ago
- Ground: Padang Ibukota Setapak
- Owner: Isa Al Farouq Bin Mohammad Yunus
- Manager: Aman Firdaus Bin Abul Hassan
- League: FAS Division 1
- Website: http://footplr.com/tigerroversfc
Home colours	Away colours

Tiger Rovers Football Club is a Malaysian semi-professional football club based in Setapak, Kuala Lumpur, that competes in the FAS Division 1. Founded in Oktober 2014 and the club's home ground is Ibukota Field in Taman Ibukota, Setapak, Kuala Lumpur.

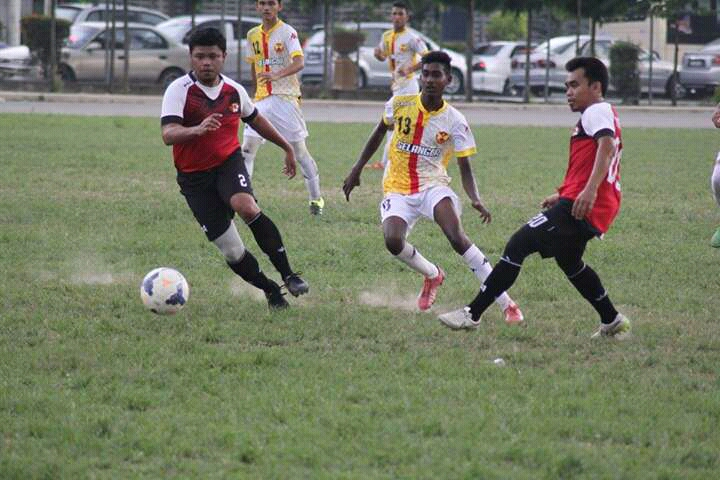
Tiger Rovers F.C against Belia Selangor in first round Selangor F.A Cup 2016

== Training Ground ==
Tiger Rovers F.C are based at Ibukota Field 5, located in Taman Ibukota, Setapak, Kuala Lumpur. All their preparation matches as well as training sessions will be from within the confines of the field. The field complete with facilities such as a toilet, indoor court, playground and a small gym facility. The field can currently train at night with DIY sportlight.

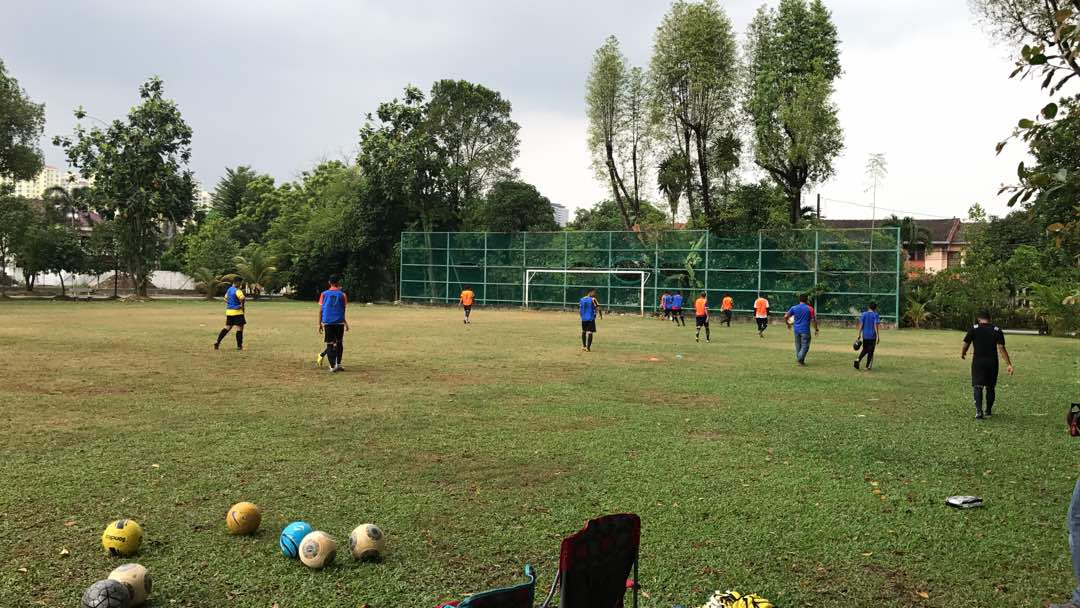
Selection player for selangor league 2017 on training ground Tiger Rovers F.C

== Sponsorship ==
Tiger Rovers F.C are sponsored by a single sponsorship. These sponsorships also include partnerships in taking the club to higher levels.

In terms of venue, Tiger Rovers F.C are sponsored by Amanz Network, a famous gadget blog in Malaysia, which agreed to a 1-year sponsorship in late 2017.

== Honours and achievements ==
=== Honours ===
==== League ====
- FAS Premier League
  - Table (8/8): 2015
- FAS Division One League
  - Table (11/15): 2016
  - Table (5/7): 2017
  - Table (3/6): 2018

== Team Officials ==
- Manager : Aman Firdaus Bin Abul Hassan
- Assistant Manager: Ikhwan Nazri Bin Mohd Asran
- Head coach: Isa Al Farouq Bin Mohammad Yunus
- Assistant Head coach : Muhammad Fizuan Bin Fadil
- Goalkeeper Coach: Muhammad Fizuan Bin Fadil
- Kitman : Shaipul Bin Abd Kadir

== Managers ==
Year	Manager
2014 - 2017	Isa Al Farouq Bin Mohammad Yunus
2017–present	Aman Firdaus Bin Abul Hassan

== Coaches Staff ==
Year	Head coach
2014 - 2017	Isa Al Farouq Bin Mohammad Yunus
2017–present	Mohd Shaipul Bin Abd Kadir

Year	Assistant Coach
2014 - 2015	Man Bodin
2017–present	Isa Al Farouq Bin Mohammad Yunus

Year	Goalkepper Coach
2014 - 2015	Amirul Syafik Yusri
2015 - 2017	Isa Al Farouq Bin Mohammad Yunus
2017–Present	Muhammad Fizuan Bin Fadil
