= Perak Football Association =

Malaysian football association

Perak Football Association Persatuan Bola Sepak Perak
- Founded: 1921; 105 years ago
- Purpose: Football association
- Headquarters: No. 70A, Jalan Kamaruddin Isa, Fair Park, 31400
- Location: Ipoh, Perak, Malaysia
- President: Mohd Azhar Jamaluddin

Perak Football Association or Perak Amateur Football Association (PAFA; Malay: Persatuan Bolasepak Perak) is the governing body of football for the state of Perak, Malaysia. PAFA is responsible for coordinating and developing regional football, and has teamed up with the Football Association of Malaysia (FAM) as the official governing body of football in Malaysia.

== History ==
=== Origins ===
Founded in 1921 as Perak Amateur Football Association (Malay: Persatuan Bola Sepak Amatur Perak), Perak has been represented by a team in the Malaya Cup since its inaugural season. They were also one of the founding members of the Malayan Football Association (the predecessor to the modern Football Association of Malaysia) in 1926. However, the team was not officially registered until 18 April 1951, when the newly formed governing body of Perak football, the Perak Amateur Football Association (PAFA) took over its management.

== Association management ==
Positions	Name
President	(Malaysia) Mohd Azhar Jamaluddin
General secretary	(Malaysia) G. Irudinathan
Executive committee members	(Malaysia) Megat Amerudin
Executive committee members	(Malaysia) Mohd Rizairi Jamaluddin
Executive committee members	(Malaysia) Mohd Jamil Zakaria
Executive committee members	(Malaysia) Mohd Khusairi Abd. Latif
Executive committee members	(Malaysia) Ahmad Feisal Zulkifli
Executive committee members	(Malaysia) Zainal Anwar Abdul Rashid
Executive committee members	(Malaysia) Azahan Ismail
Executive committee members	(Malaysia) Hairul Anwar Mohamed Noor
Executive committee members	(Malaysia) Mohd Noor Ismail Azmi
Executive committee members	(Malaysia) Izham Firdaus Jamaluddin

== Former presidents ==
Years	Name
1957–1972	Teoh Chye Hin
1999–2006	DYTM Raja Dr. Nazrin Shah ibni Sultan Azlan Muhibbuddin Shah
2008–2010	Mohamad Nizar Jamaluddin
2010–September 2015	Zainol Fadzi Paharudin
September 2015–August 2018	Abdul Puhat Mat Nayan
August 2018–October 2018	Hasnul Zulkarnain Abdul Munaim
November 2018–January 2021	Ahmad Faizal Azumu

== Competitions ==
The Perak Football Association organises the Perak League for its regional level clubs.

== Affiliations ==
Clubs in the higher league competitions affiliated to the Perak Football Association include:

- Perak FA state football team, Malaysia A1 Semi-Pro League
- Manjung City F.C., Malaysia A1 Semi-Pro League
- Perak FA II, Malaysia A2 Amateur League
- Pencinta Setia F.C., Malaysia A3 Community League
- BRM Kuala Kangsar F.C.
- TKN F.C.
- Perak YBU F.C.
- UPB-MyTeam F.C., defunct
- Perak F.C., defunct
- PKNP FC, defunct

=== District football association ===
There are 14 football associations affiliated to the PAFA.

- Perak Malay's FA
- (Perak) Kerian FA
- (Perak) Larut, Matang & Selama FA
- (Perak) Pengkalan Hulu FA
- (Perak) Lenggong FA
- (Perak) Gerik FA
- (Perak) Batang Padang FA
- (Perak) Ipoh FA
- (Perak) Kampar FA
- (Perak) Muallim FA
- (Perak) Bagan Datuk FA
- Hilir Perak FA
- (Perak) Kg. Gajah FA
- (Perak) Manjung FA

== See also ==
- Piala Presiden
- Piala Belia
- History of Malaysian football
