= 1999 Liga Perdana 2 =

- Season: 1999
- Champions: Johor; 1st title
- Promoted: Johor; Selangor; Perlis
- Matches played: 180

The 1999 Liga Perdana 2 season was the second season of Liga Perdana 2. A total of ten teams participated in the season.

Selangor and Perlis were relegated from Liga Perdana 1 while TMFC and Kelantan TNB were promoted from Malaysia FAM League to a now increased total number of teams competing in the league from eight to become ten teams.

The season kicked off on 19 March 1999. Johor won the title and was promoted to Liga Perdana 1 alongside Selangor.

== Teams ==
Ten teams competing in the second season of Liga Perdana 2.

- Johor (1999 Liga Perdana 2 champions)
- Selangor
- Johor FC
- Perlis
- Kelantan
- Malacca
- (Malaysia) ATM
- (Malacca) TMFC
- (Negeri Sembilan) NS Chempaka
- Kelantan TNB

== League table ==
1.Johor - 38 PTS (1999 Liga Perdana 2 Champions)

2.Selangor - 37 PTS (Promoted to Liga Perdana 1)

3.Johor FC - 33 PTS

4.Perlis - 31 PTS (Promoted to Liga Perdana 1)

5.Kelantan - 29 PTS

6.Malacca - 26 PTS

7.ATM - 25 PTS

8.TMFC - 24 PTS

9.NS Chempaka - 14 PTS

10.Kelantan TNB - 13 PTS

== Champions ==
1999 Liga Perdana 1 champion

Johor
1st title
