= Chris Dawson =

Christopher Dawson or Chris Dawson may refer to:

- Chris Dawson (businessman) (born 1952), British businessman, founder and chief executive officer of The Range
- Chris Dawson (footballer, born 1994), English-born Welsh footballer
- Chris Dawson (footballer, born 1979), English-born Seychelles footballer
- Chris Dawson (governor), Australian police officer and governor
- Christopher Dawson (1889–1970), British historian
- Chris Dawson (rugby league), Australian rugby league player and convicted murderer
