= 2005–06 in Malaysian football =

== Super League Malaysia ==
The 2006-07 Premier League season, the third season since its establishment on 2004, started on December 3, 2005.

=== League table ===
Pos	Club	Pld	W	D	L	F	A	GD	Pts
1	(Negeri Sembilan) Negri Sembilan	21	12	4	5	26	14	12	40
2	(Malacca) Melaka Telekom FC	21	21	6	3	54	19	35	69
3	Perak	21	16	7	6	51	24	27	55
4	Perlis	21	16	6	8	44	19	25	54
5	Selangor PJ City FC	21	14	5	11	36	39	-3	47
6	Penang E & O	21	12	10	8	38	26	12	46
7	Pahang	21	13	6	11	43	44	-1	45
8	Selangor	21	13	5	12	43	38	5	44

Pld = Matches played; W = Matches won; D = Matches drawn; L = Matches lost; F = Goals for; A = Goals against; GD = Goal difference; Pts = Points

Key to colours in league table
Champion and qualified to AFC Cup
Relegated to Premier League Malaysia
