= Reduan Abdullah =

Malaysian footballer and coach

Personal information
- Full name: Mohd Reduan bin Abdullah
- Date of birth: 26 December 1952 (age 73)
- Place of birth: Selangor, Malaysia
- Position: Midfielder

Senior career*
Years	Team	Apps	(Gls)
1973–1985	Selangor FA		

International career
1973–1981	Malaysia		

Managerial career
- 2000–2003: MPPJ FC
- 2005: MPPJ FC
- 2006–2009: Felda United FC
- 2010: Penang FA
- 2014: Perlis FA
- 2021: UiTM F.C.
- * Club domestic league appearances and goals

Reduan Abdullah is a retired Malaysian football player, and a current coach for UiTM FC in Malaysia Super League.

As a player, Reduan played as a midfielder, and closely associated with Selangor FA team in the Malaysia Cup competition in the 1970s and early 1980s. He won 1973, 1976, 1978, 1979, 1981, 1982 and 1984 Malaysia Cup. During that period, Reduan also played for Malaysia national football team, participating in several tournaments, including Merdeka Tournament and 1978 FIFA World Cup qualification. On 26 November 1977, He was also a part of the Malaysian players that won the gold medals in the regional SEA Games in 1977. In 1982, He was selected in AFC Asian All Stars.

After his playing day ended, Reduan turned into coaching and his early coaching years saw him as assistant coach for Selangor in the 1987 Malaysia Cup season. Reduan later took charge of MPPJ FC, a team in the Malaysia FAM League, in late 1990s. With the club gradually made way to the second-tier Malaysia Premier League II, Reduan was replaced by Dollah Salleh in mid-2003, who later guided the team to the 2003 Malaysia Cup victory. Reduan was back as coach of MPPJ FC in early 2005 replacing Dollah, but later was replaced again in mid-2005, this time with German coach Michael Feichtenbeiner.

Felda United FC was the next club Reduan coached, appointed in 2006. Reduan succeeded in getting the newly created club promoted from the FAM League to the 2007–08 Malaysia Premier League and achieving sixth place in their maiden season of the Premier League. However Reduan courted controversy in 2009 when he was slapped with a 12-month ban and fined by Football Association of Malaysia for his criticism of the governing body. Felda United sacked him as a result of the ban.

He briefly managed Penang FA in 2010, taking over from Mohammad Bakar. After a spell in the media as football pundit for terrestrial (RTM) and satellite television (Astro), Reduan was appointed by Perlis FA as their new head coach in early 2014. On July the same year, Reduan was appointed as assistant manager of Malaysia national team, working with head coach Dollah Salleh When Dollah was sacked in 2015, Reduan were also released from his job.

He later coached youth teams in Bukit Jalil Sports School, and leading its U-17 team to win the 2016 Piala Belia.
