= Kelantan F.C. =

Association football club in Kelantan, Malaysia

Kelantan
- Full name: Kelantan Football Club
- Nickname: The Red Warriors
- Short name: TRW
- Founded: 1946; 80 years ago, as Kelantan FA; 2021; 5 years ago, as Kelantan FC
- Dissolved: 2024; 2 years ago
- Ground: Sultan Muhammad IV Stadium
- Capacity: 22,000
- Owner: Norizam Tukiman
- League: Malaysia Super League
- 2023: Malaysia Super League, 14th of 14 (expelled)

Kelantan Football Club (Malay: Kelab Bola Sepak Kelantan) was a Malaysian professional football club based in Kota Bharu, Kelantan. Founded in 1948 as Kelantan Amateur Football Association. The club had a long-standing rivalry with Terengganu. The two east coast clubs were involved in the East Coast Derby. Their home was the then 22,000-seat Sultan Muhammad IV Stadium. Kelantan's regular kit colours were red shirt and shorts with a white pattern on the side.

The club had their first major success in the 2012 season, when they won the treble (Super League, Malaysia FA Cup and Malaysia Cup). Domestically, the club has won 2 Malaysia Super League, 1 Malaysia Premier League, 2 Malaysia FA Cup, 2 Malaysia Cup and 1 Charity Shield title. Kelantan made their continental debut playing in the AFC Cup. They won the first place in the group stage. However, the club lost in the quarter final to Erbil SC 6–2 on aggregate.

Kelantan had obtained the FAM Club License to play in the 2018 Malaysia Super League season. On 17 January 2024, Kelantan F.C. was expelled from the Malaysia Super League over the financial problems.

== History ==
Kelantan Football Club was founded in 1948 as Kelantan Amateur Football Association. KAFA won the first cup in 1953 when they won the Malaysia FAM Cup and retained the cup for the next year. In 1963, KAFA played in the final Malaysia FAM Cup but lost to Singapore. By the period of the 70s, The club had been unlucky when they lost three cup finals (Malaysia cup 1970, FAM cup 1971 and 1972). In 1972 Dali Omar became the first Kelantanese-born player who played abroad, joining Perth Azurri. The former chief minister of Kelantan, Ahmad Rastom Ahmad Maher, was appointed as the president in 1986. 5 years later, the former Kelantan state secretary Wan Hashim Wan Daud took over the position, until 2024. By 2005, Kelantan was relegated to the third-tier Malaysia FAM League.

=== 2009 season ===
2009 was the Kelantan debut season in the Malaysia Super League after promotion from the Malaysia Premier League. They obtained 6th spot in the league with 44 points. During the Malaysia FA Cup final, they have lost to Selangor 1–4. Malaysia Cup became their second final for the season, but they lost to Negeri Sembilan.

=== 2010 season ===
The team gained second place in the Malaysia Super League with 59 points. The top scorer was Norshahrul Idlan with 14 goals. Kelantan's 89-year cup drought ended in the 2010 Malaysia Cup after defeating Negeri Sembilan 2–1. B. Sathianathan refused to commit his future to the newly crowned Malaysia Cup champions. Their campaign in the 2009 Malaysia FA Cup ended when Kedah advanced to next round based on away goals rule.

=== 2011 season ===
Kelantan started their 2011 season by beating Selangor 2–0 in the Charity Shield match held at the Shah Alam Stadium, with the goals scored by Norshahrul Idlan and Badhri Radzi. In the Malaysia FA Cup campaign, Kelantan lost to Terengganu 1–2 in the final. During the Malaysia Super League campaign, Kelantan won the title for the first time. Therefore, they qualified for the 2012 AFC Cup. Norshahrul Idlan became the top scorer for the team. Kelantan's Malaysia Cup campaign ended in the quarter-finals as they lost to Terengganu with 5–3 on aggregate.

=== 2012 season ===
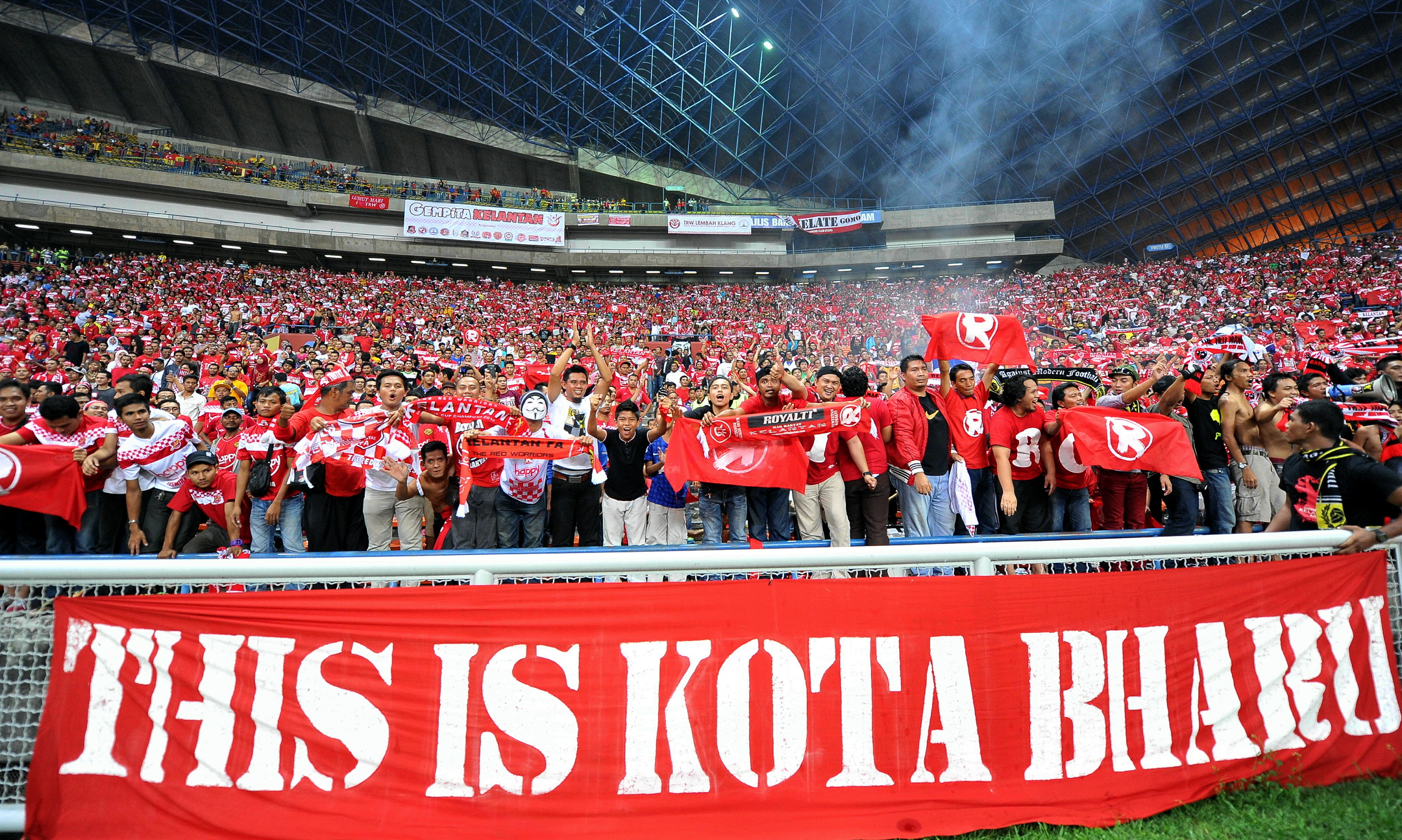
Kelantan FA fans in the 2012 Malaysia Cup semi-final match against Selangor

In the 2012 season, the team clinched their second successive Malaysia Super League title after thrashing Perak 6–0 at home. During the 2012 Malaysia Cup campaign, they won the final against ATM. The historical win completed a treble.

=== 2013 season ===
Kelantan started the season with a defeat to ATM in the Charity Shield match. They got 1 win, 3 draws, and 1 loss in the first 5 matches.

In the 2013 Malaysia FA Cup, the team met Johor Darul Ta'zim in the final, after defeating Terengganu with 6–5 on aggregate. They defeated Sarawak in the quarter-finals with 4–1 on aggregate. During the final, the sole goal was scored by Nor Farhan Muhammad 15 minutes into the game. With this victory Kelantan successfully retained their Malaysia FA Cup title for the second year.

=== 2014 season ===
Kelantan started the season with a win against Sime Darby at their home ground, Sultan Muhammad IV Stadium. Steve Darby was replaced by George Boateng after a big lost 0–4 to Sime Darby. Ghanaian forward Prince Tagoe signed with Kelantan after the departure of Mohammed Ghaddar. He only made 3 appearances before being released due to poor performance.

=== 2015 season ===
Kelantan began the 2015 season with a 2–0 win over ATM at Majlis Perbandaran Selayang Stadium. Their 2015 Malaysia Super League ended at 9th place with 8 wins, 4 draws and 10 losses. They became the 2015 Malaysia FA Cup runners-up after losing 1–3 to LionsXII. Their 2015 Malaysia Cup ended in 3rd place in group C. George Boateng was replaced by Azraai Khor on 24 March. On 4 July, Azraai Khor resigned and was replaced by Zahasmi Ismail. Wan Zaharulnizam became the first player to win PFAM Player of the Month. Brazilian Gilmar became their top scorer with 11 goals.

=== 2016 season ===
The team started the season with a 0–0 draw against Perak. Their 2016 Malaysia Super League campaign ended at 4th place, with 7 wins, 8 draws and 7 losses, 29 points collected. Their 2016 Malaysia FA Cup journey ended at the round of 16 after losing to Kedah. The Malaysia Cup campaign ended with elimination in the quarter-finals. Head coach K. Devan resigned on 12 May, being replaced by Velizar Popov. Baze Ilijoski became top scorer of the team with 16 goals. This season also saw a change in the club presidency after Tan Sri Annuar Musa decided to quit, with the position temporarily held by the vice-president Afandi Hamzah.

=== 2017 season ===
On 30 November 2016, Zahasmi Ismail was appointed the new head coach. Kelantan almost got relegated, but came strong during last match with a 1–3 win over Melaka United, and finished at the 10th position.

=== 2020 season ===
On 6 September 2020, the club was purchased by businessman Norizam Tukiman for RM 6.8 million.

=== 2021 season ===
For 2021, as part of the effort to revamp the club, they appointed all new coaching staff. Norizam Tukiman expanded his empire by purchasing an Indonesian club, PSPS Riau. The acquisition opened up opportunities for both clubs to establish a long-term cooperation.

=== 2022 season ===
During 2022 Malaysia Premier League, Kelantan finished second and got promoted after 5 years.

=== 2023 season ===
For the 2023 season, Kelantan appointed Choi Moon-Sik as new head coach. They also participated in the 2023 ASEAN Charity Shield against Buriram United. They conceded the most goals in the history of the Malaysian League (121), thus occupying the lowest position in the league.

== Sponsorship ==
=== Title and shirt sponsors ===
Season	Kit manufacturer	Shirt sponsor
1986	Schwarzenbach	
1987–1988	Puma	Dunhill / Puma
1989–1990	Diadora	Dunhill / EON
1991	Saller	Dunhill / EON
1992	Mizuno	Dunhill / EON
1993	Le Coq Sportif	Dunhill / EON
1994	Umbro	Dunhill
1995	Reebok	Dunhill
1996–1999	Asics	Dunhill
2000–2002	Kronos	Dunhill
2003	Mizuno	Dunhill
2004	Eepro	Dunhill
2005	Eutag	Perodua
2005–06	Eutag	Celcom
2006–07	Eutag	Celcom
2007–08	Nike	Celcom/Redland
2009	Sportzone	TM/Al Hamra
2010	Umbro	TM/Al Hamra
2011	Umbro	Happy/Warrior
2012	Umbro	Happy/Yusmira
2013	Warriors	Hotlink/AzizanOsman.com
2014	Warriors	Hotlink/Kicap Adabi
2015	Warriors	Chengal Jati/Kicap Adabi
2016	DSV	Pamoga Qu Puteh/Chengal Jati
2017	HORC	Red One/Al Hamra & Chengal Jati
2018	Lotto	BMW (Raza Premium Auto)
2019	PUC	BMW (Raza Premium Auto)
2020	PUC, TRW & Fitech	After Image/Nexy/Cleantech Oil/Ico-fresh/Zamburger
2021–22	93 Sports	93 Sports/Zamburger/Hotel Zamburger/Radio Zamburger
2023	93 Sports	Skygear/Hotel Zamburger

== Affiliated clubs ==
- (Wales) Cardiff City
- (England) Blackburn Rovers
- (Italy) FC Bari 1908

== AFC Cup competition ==
=== 2012 season ===
2012 was Kelantan's AFC Cup debut, in group G with Arema Cronous, Ayeyawady United and Navibank Sài Gòn. The team was on top of the table with 13 points in 6 matches. Terengganu was defeated by Kelantan in the round of 16 by 3–2. During quarter-finals, Kelantan lost to Erbil SC from Iraq 6–2 on aggregate. Mohammed Ghaddar was the team top scorer with 8 goals.

=== 2013 season ===
Kelantan started their campaign on 6 March with 1–1 draw against Maziya. Their goal was scored by Badhri Radzi. Kelantan has gained first place in group G with SHB Đà Nẵng, Maziya and Ayeyawady United. In the round of 16 they were defeated by Kitchee SC by 2–0.

=== 2014 season ===
Kelantan was drawn into group G along with South China, Yangon United and Vissai Ninh Bình. They finished bottom of the group with 3 points from 6 matches. On 26 February, the team started their AFC campaign with a 5–3 loss to Yangon United. Wan Zaharulnizam scored 1 goal and 2 more goals came from the captain Badhri Radzi. Wan Zaharulnizam became the top scorer of the team during the 2014 campaign with 3 goals.

== Stadium ==
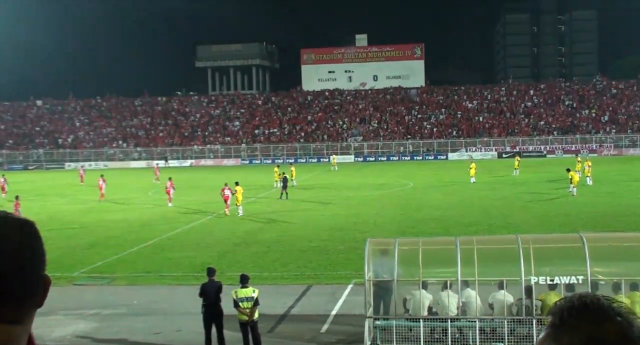
During the league match against Selangor at the Sultan Muhammad IV Stadium

Sultan Muhammad IV Stadium is the oldest football field in Malaysia and probably the oldest in Asia, based on the use of field. The stadium was built in 1967.

== Season-by-season records ==
Season	League									Charity Shield	Malaysia FA Cup	Malaysia Cup	AFC Cup	Top scorer	
Season	Division	P	W	D	L	F	A	Pts	Pos	Charity Shield	Malaysia FA Cup	Malaysia Cup	AFC Cup	Name	Goals
1989	DIV 1	16	2	3	11	8	26	9	9th	–	N/a	–	–	—N/a	—N/a
1990	DIV 2	14	9	2	3	38	15	29	2nd	–	–	–	–	Hashim Mustapha; Boonphop Praphut	13
1991	DIV 1	18	6	1	11	24	40	19	10th	–	–	–	–	—N/a	—N/a
1992	DIV 2	14	5	4	5	27	18	19	3rd	–	–	–	–	Dariusz Dudala	9
1993	DIV 1	18	5	4	9	31	34	19	6th	–	–	SF	–	Hashim Mustapha	13
1994	PL	28	11	7	10	48	42	40	9th	–	–	GS	–	Hashim Mustapha	25
1995	PL	28	5	8	15	31	49	23	15th	–	–	–	–	Hashim Mustapha	11
1996	PL	28	4	5	19	18	52	17	15th	–	–	–	–	—N/a	—N/a
1997	PL	28	8	4	16	33	58	28	13th	–	R2	–	–	—N/a	—N/a
1998	PL2	14	6	6	2	20	16	24	3rd	–	R2	–	–	—N/a	—N/a
1999	PL2	18	7	5 (Note: Draw were followed by penalty shootouts for an additional point.)	6	23	26	29	5th	–	QF	–	–	—N/a	—N/a
2000	PL2	18	10	6	2	48	21	36	1st	–	R2	QF	–	Anuar Abu Bakar	15
2001	PL1	22	11	5	6	33	21	38	3rd	–	R1	SF	–	Anuar Abu Bakar	7
2002	PL1	26	9	3	14	29	41	30	10th	–	R2	GS	–	Worrawoot Srimaka	15
2003	PL1	24	7	7	10	31	52	28	10th	–	R1	GS	–	Fatrurazi Rozi	7
2004	MPL	24	1	7	16	13	42	10	9th	–	R1	–	–	Khairul Zal Azmi	3
2005	FAM League (Champions)									–	QF	–	–	—N/a	—N/a
2005–06	MPL	21	7	5	9	33	35	26	6th	–	R2	–	–	—N/a	—N/a
2006–07	MPL	20	4	8	8	23	31	20	8th	–	R2	GS	–	—N/a	—N/a
2007–08	MPL	24	16	5	3	59	30	53	3rd	–	R1	GS	–	Mohamed Moustapha	27
2009	MSL	26	14	2	10	49	36	44	6th	–	RU	RU	–	Indra Putra Mahayuddin	14
2010	MSL	26	17	8	1	50	14	59	2nd	–	R2	W	–	Norshahrul Idlan	11
2011	MSL	26	17	5	4	52	21	56	1st	W	RU	QF	–	Norshahrul Idlan	18
2012	MSL	26	18	6	2	53	18	60	1st	RU	W	W	QF	Mohammed Ghaddar	9
2013	MSL	22	10	6	6	32	20	36	4th	RU	W	RU	R16	Badhri Radzi; Indra Putra Mahayuddin; Nor Farhan Muhammad	6
2014	MSL	22	10	1	11	26	29	31	6th	–	SF	QF	GS	Francis Doe	5
2015	MSL	22	8	4	10	34	38	28	9th	–	RU	GS	–	Gilmar	6
2016	MSL	22	7	8	7	37	33	29	4th	–	R3	QF	–	Blazhe Ilijoski	14
2017	MSL	22	7	4	11	31	39	22	10th	–	R2	GS	–	Mohammed Ghaddar	18
2018	MSL	22	5	3	14	20	43	18	11th	–	R3	QF	–	Shafiq Shaharudin	6
2019	MPL	20	4	8	8	23	32	17	10th	-	-	-	-	Nik Akif	5
2020	MPL	11	5	3	3	14	11	15	6th	-	-	R1	-	Felix Chidi Odili	4
2021	MPL	20	8	3	9	23	28	27	6th	-	-	GS	-	Nurshamil Abd Ghani	9
2022	MPL	18	11	4	3	27	14	37	2nd	-	R1	QF	-	Nurshamil Abd Ghani	10
2023	MSL	21	2	2	17	24	87	8			QF	R16			

Champions	Runners-up	Third Place	Promoted	Relegated

- P = Played
- W = Games won
- D = Games drawn
- L = Games lost
- F = Goals for
- A = Goals against
- Pts = Points
- Pos = Final position
- N/A = Not available
- MSL = Malaysia Super League
- MPL = Malaysia Premier League
- PL1 = Premier League 1
- PL2 = Premier League 2
- PL = Premier League
- R1 = Round 1
- R2 = Round 2
- R3 = Round 3
- R4 = Round 4
- R5 = Round 5
- R6 = Round 6
- R16 = Round of 16
- GR = Group Stage
- QF = Quarter-finals
- SF = Semi-finals
- RU = Runners-up
- S = Shared
- W = Winners

== Individual player awards ==
=== Golden Boot winners ===
Season	Player	Goals
1992	(Poland) Dariusz Dudala	9
1993	(Malaysia) Hashim Mustapha	13
1994	(Malaysia) Hashim Mustapha	25
2000	(Malaysia) Anuar Abu Bakar	15
2007–08	(Senegal) Mohamed Moustapha	27

=== Club top goalscorers ===
Season	Player	Goals
2007–08	(Senegal) Mohamed Moustapha	32
2009	(Malaysia) Indra Putra Mahayuddin	30
2010	(Malaysia) Norshahrul Idlan	14
2011	(Malaysia) Norshahrul Idlan	24
2012	(Lebanon) Mohammed Ghaddar	21
2013	(Malaysia) Badhri Radzi	16
2014	(Liberia) Francis Doe	13
2015	(Brazil) Gilmar	11
2016	(North Macedonia) Blazhe Ilijoski	16
2017	(Lebanon) Mohammed Ghaddar	18
2018	(Malaysia) Shafiq Shaharudin	7
2019	(Malaysia) Nik Akif	5
2020	(Nigeria) Felix Chidi Odili	4
2021	(Malaysia) Nurshamil Abd Ghani	9
2022	(Malaysia) Nurshamil Abd Ghani	10

== Honours ==
=== International competitions ===
- AFC Cup: 3 appearances
  - 2012: Quarter-finals (lost 2–6 on aggregate to Arbil)
  - 2013: Round of 16 (lost 0–2 to Kitchee)
  - 2014: Group stage (4th position)

=== League ===
- Division 1/ Malaysia Super League

Winners (2): 2011, 2012
Runners-up (1): 2010

- Division 2/ Malaysia Premier League

Winners (1): 2000
Runners-up (2): 1990, 2022

- Division 3/ Malaysia FAM League

Winners (3): 1953*, 1954, 2005 (* shared)
Runners-up (3): 1963, 1971, 1972

=== Cups ===
- Malaysia Cup

Winners (2): 2010, 2012
Runners-up (4): 1955, 1970, 2009, 2013

- Malaysia FA Cup

Winners (2): 2012, 2013
Runners-up (3): 2009, 2011, 2015

- Charity Shield

Winners (1): 2011
Runners-up (2): 2012, 2013

=== Treble ===
- "Treble Winner" (Malaysia Super League, Malaysia FA Cup and Malaysia Cup): 1
  - 2012

=== U21 team ===
- President Cup

Winners (7): 1985, 1995, 2005, 2011, 2013, 2015, 2016
Runners-up (3): 1988, 2003, 2006–07

=== U19 team ===
- Youth Cup

Winners (2): 2008, 2014
Runners-up (1): 2013

=== Record of success ===
Year	Competition	Score	Against	Result
1953	Malaysia FAM League	1–1	Selangor	Shared
1954	Liga FAM	2–1	Malayan Combined Services	Champion
1963	Malaysia FAM League	0–7	Singapura	Runner-up
1971	Liga FAM	2–5	Prisons	Runner-up
1972	Malaysia FAM League	1–2	Selangor	Runner-up
2000	Liga Premier	-	-	Champion
2005	Malaysia FAM League	2–0	Shahzan Muda	Champion
2005	Piala Agong	2–2 (lost 5–6 on penalties)	Pahang	Runner-up
2005	Piala Emas Raja-Raja	0–1	Kedah	Runner-up
2006	Piala Emas Raja-Raja	5–1	ATM	Champion
2009	Piala Emas Raja-Raja	4–0	Penang	Champion
2009	Malaysia FA Cup	1–1 (lost 1–4 on penalties)	Selangor	Runner-up
2009	Malaysia Cup	1–3	Negeri Sembilan	Runner-up
2010	Piala Emas Raja-Raja	0–0 (won 4–3 on penalties)	Kedah	Champion
2010	Malaysia Cup	2–1	Negeri Sembilan	Champion
2010	Malaysia Super League	59 Points	-	Runner-up
2011	Charity Shield	2–0	Selangor	Champion
2011	Malaysia FA Cup	1–2	Terengganu	Runner-up
2011	Malaysia Super League	56 Points	-	Champion
2012	Charity Shield	1–2	Negeri Sembilan	Runner-up
2012	Malaysia FA Cup	1–0	Sime Darby	Champion
2012	Malaysia Super League	60 Points	-	Champion
2012	Malaysia Cup	3–2	ATM	Champion
2013	Charity Shield	1–1 (lost 3–4 on penalties)	ATM	Runner-up
2013	Malaysia FA Cup	1–0	Johor Darul Takzim	Champion
2013	Malaysia Cup	0–1	Pahang	Runner-up
2015	Malaysia FA Cup	1–3	LionsXII	Runner-up
2022	Malaysia Premier League	37 Points	-	Runner-up

== Managerial/coaching history ==
Name	Nationality	Years	Notes
Yusoff Ali	Malaysia	1991	
Zulkifle Wan Yusoff	Malaysia	1994	
Suhaidi Yusof	Malaysia	1998	
Wan Hashim Wan Daud	Malaysia	1998–2002	
Azman Ibrahim	Malaysia	2005	
Ahmad Jazlan Yaakub	Malaysia	2006–2008	
Peter James Butler	England	2009	First foreign manager
Azman Ibrahim	Malaysia	2009 – 13 November 2012	
Bojan Hodak	Croatia	13 November 2012–16 February 2013	Second foreign manager
Azman Ibrahim	Malaysia	17 February 2013–14 November 2015	
K. Devan	Malaysia	5 December 2015 – 12 May 2016	
Velizar Popov	Bulgaria	12 May 2016 – 12 July 2016	Third foreign manager
Wan Badri Wan Omar	Malaysia	12 July 2016 – 31 December 2016	
Rosmadi Ismail	Malaysia	1 January 2017 – 17 June 2017	
Alfredo Gonzales	Uruguay	17 June 2017 – 20 July 2017	Fourth foreign manager
Afandi Hamzah	Malaysia	20 July 2017 – 31 December 2017	
Yahya Jamada Ali	Malaysia	1 January 2018 – 2 July 2018	
Wan Rakemi Wan Zahari	Malaysia	3 July 2018 – 31 December 2018	
Nik Phakaruddin	Malaysia	1 January 2019 – December 2019	
Qusmaini Noor Rusli	Malaysia	January 2021 – 2024	
Yusoff Mohamed	Malaysia	1986	
Hamid Ghani	Malaysia	1987	
Milan Đuričić	Yugoslavia	1988	
Majid Ariff	Singapore	1989	
Mahadi Yusoff (caretaker)	Malaysia	1989	
Mohammad Che Su	Malaysia	1989 – 1990	
Milan Đuričić	Yugoslavia	1991	
Mahadi Yusoff (caretaker)	Malaysia	1991	
Horst Heese	Germany	1992	
M. Karathu	Malaysia	1993	
Milouš Kvaček	Czechoslovakia	1994 – 1995	
Kelly Tham	Malaysia	1996 – 1997	
Kamaruddin Md. Noor	Malaysia	1998	
Mosthakeen Omar	Malaysia	1999	
Abdul Rahim	Malaysia	2000	
K. Rajagobal	Malaysia	2001 – 2003	
Kamaruddin Pabli	Malaysia	2003 – 2004	
Abdul Rahim	Malaysia	2005 – 2006	
Kamaruddin Mohamad	Malaysia	2007	
Anizan Daud	Malaysia	2007	
Norizan Bakar	Malaysia	2008	
Régis Laguesse	France	2008	
Peter Butler	England	2008 – 2009	
B. Sathianathan	Malaysia	2009 – 2011	
M. Karathu	Malaysia	2011	
Peter Butler	England	2011 – 2012	
Bojan Hodak	Croatia	2012 – 2013	
Steve Darby	England	2013 – 2014	
George Boateng	Netherlands	2014 – 2015	
Mohd Azraai Khor Abdullah	Malaysia	2015	
Zahasmi Ismail (caretaker)	Malaysia	2015 – 2016	
K. Devan	Malaysia	5 December 2015 – 11 May 2016	
Velizar Popov	Bulgaria	12 May 2016 – 22 October 2016	
Zahasmi Ismail	Malaysia	30 November 2016 – 30 November 2017	
Sathit Bensoh	Thailand	7 December 2017 – 15 February 2018	
Yusri Che Lah (caretaker)	Malaysia	15 February 2018 – 19 March 2018	
Fajr Ibrahim	Syria	21 March 2018 – 5 June 2018	
Yusri Che Lah (caretaker)	Malaysia	5 June 2018 –	
Marko Kraljević	Croatia	26 January 2019 – 9 April 2019	
Jörg Steinebrunner (caretaker)	Germany	9 April 2019 – 15 April 2019	
Yusri Che Lah	Malaysia	15 April 2019 – 30 November 2020	
Marco Ragini	San Marino	15 January 2021 – 19 November 2021	
Rezal Zambery Yahya	Malaysia	19 November 2021 – 12 January 2023	
Choi Moon-sik	South Korea	12 January 2023 – 4 April 2023	
Rezal Zambery Yahya (caretaker)	Malaysia	4 April 2023 – 8 April 2023	
Frank Bernhardt	Germany	9 April 2023 – December 2023	

== Captain history ==
Captain by years (2016–2023)

Years	Captain	Nationality	Vice-captain	Nationality
2016	Badhri Radzi	Malaysia	Indra Putra	Malaysia
2017	Badhri Radzi	Malaysia	Indra Putra	Malaysia
2018 (Note: Badhri Radzi was the team captain and Khairul Fahmi was the vice-captain)	Shahrizan Ismail	Malaysia	Farisham Ismail	Malaysia
2019	Cássio	Brazil	Farisham Ismail	Malaysia
2020	Farisham Ismail	Malaysia	Nik Akif	Malaysia
2021	Che Safwan Hazman	Malaysia	Mario Arqués	Spain
2022	Yusri Yuhasmadi	Malaysia	Nurshamil Abd Ghani	Malaysia
2023	Mario Arqués	Spain	Christian Rontini	Philippines

== Hall of fame ==
=== 100+ appearances ===
- (Malaysia) Mohd Badhri Mohd Radzi
- (Malaysia) Khairul Fahmi Che Mat
- (Malaysia) Indra Putra Mahayuddin
- (Malaysia) Nor Farhan Muhammad
- (Malaysia) Farisham Ismail

* Senior club appearances counted for the domestic league only, from 2008 to 2023.

== See also ==
Achievements
Preceded by Selangor	Malaysia Super League Champions; 2011, 2012	Succeeded by LionsXII
Preceded by Terengganu	Malaysia FA Cup Champions; 2012, 2013	Succeeded by Pahang
Preceded by Negeri Sembilan	Malaysia Cup Champions; 2012	Succeeded by Pahang
Preceded by Selangor	Charity Shield Champions; 2011	Succeeded by Negeri Sembilan
Preceded by Kedah	Treble Winners; 2012	Succeeded by Incumbent
