= 2002 Liga Perdana 2 =

- Season: 2002
- Champions: Kedah; 2nd title
- Promoted: Kedah (Malacca) Telekom Melaka
- Matches played: 264

The 2002 Liga Perdana 2 season was the fifth season of Liga Perdana 2. A total of 12 teams participated in the season.

Johor was relegated from Liga Perdana 1 to join the Liga Perdana 2. The season kicked off on 27 January 2002. Kedah won the title and was promoted to the Liga Perdana 1 alongside TM.

== Teams ==
12 teams competing in the fifth season of Liga Perdana 2.

- Kedah (2002 Liga Perdana 2 champions)
- (Malacca) Telekom Melaka
- (Selangor) MPPJ
- Selangor Public Bank FC
- Brunei
- Johor
- (Malaysia) PDRM
- (Malaysia) ATM
- Kelantan TNB
- Kelantan SKMK
- (Kuala Lumpur) KL Malay Mail
- Kedah JKR

== League table ==
Pos	Team	Pld	W	D	L	GF	GA	GD	Pts	
1	Kedah (C)	22	15	5	2	49	12	+37	50	Promotion to Liga Perdana 1
2	(Malacca) Telekom Melaka	22	14	5	3	51	20	+31	47	Promotion to Liga Perdana 1
3	(Selangor) MPPJ	22	12	2	8	32	22	+10	38	
4	Selangor Public Bank FC	22	11	5	6	36	31	+5	38	
5	Brunei	22	10	6	6	42	39	+3	36	
6	Johor	22	10	2	10	43	28	+15	32	
7	(Malaysia) PDRM	22	9	5	8	25	31	−6	32	
8	(Malaysia) ATM	22	6	4	12	28	45	−17	22	
9	Kelantan TNB	22	6	3	13	28	38	−10	21	
10	Kelantan SKMK	22	4	9	9	18	37	−19	21	
11	(Kuala Lumpur) KL Malay Mail	22	4	6	12	11	33	−22	18	Relegation to Malaysia FAM Cup
12	Kedah JKR	22	3	4	15	21	48	−27	13	Relegation to Malaysia FAM Cup

Source: rsssf.com
(C) Champions

== Fixtures and results ==
=== Round 1 ===
[Jan 27]

Kelantan TNB	0–0	Police

KL Malay Mail	2–0	Johor
Ishak Kunju Mohd 40, S.Sangar 66

Selangor Public Bank	0–2	Kedah
		Rafdi Rashid 82, 88

Melaka Telekom	1–1	Kelantan SKMK
G.Saravanan Kumar 33		Mohamad Abdullah 10

Kedah JKR	1–2	Selangor MPPJ
Farouk Ismail 87		Azrin Shah Zainal 19, Kamaruzaman Yub Majid 60

Brunei	2–1	Armed Forces
Rafael Akakpo 66, Fadhil Amir 88og		Zahid Hashim 67

=== Round 2 ===
[Feb 1]

Police	1–1	Armed Forces
Izwan Baharuddin 34		S.Ragu 83

Selangor MPPJ	1–1	Kelantan TNB
Abi Mulyadee Ismail 3		Khairul Zalazmi Zahinuden 70

Kelantan SKMK	1–1	Kedah JKR
Tengku Marzuki Tuan Mat 5		Khamal Idris Ali 88

Kedah	2–0	Melaka Telekom
Akmal Rizal Rakhli 1, Cik Hisamuddin Hassan 86

Johor	0–1	Selangor Public Bank
		Paul Raj 50

KL Malay Mail	1–1	Brunei
Shahrizan Ahkuan 65		Fadlin Galawat 90

=== Round 3 ===
[Feb 8]

Kelantan TNB	2–0	Kelantan SKMK
Badrisan Kadir 17, Ahmad Tahrin Yusoff 85

Police	1–0	Selangor MPPJ
Faizal Asmar 37

Brunei	1–2	Selangor Public Bank

Melaka Telekom	2–0	Johor
Azlan Ahmad 38, Isaac Kuffour 53

Kedah JKR	0–4	Kedah
		Rafdi Rashid 68, Akmal Rizal Rakhli 80, 81pen, Cik Hisamuddin Hassan 88

Armed Forces	0–2	KL Malay Mail
		S.Sangar 9, U.Suresh 34pen

=== Round 4 ===
[Feb 15]

Armed Forces	1–0	Selangor MPPJ
Zahid Hashim 44

Kelantan SKMK	1–1	Police
Yunainan Dollah 3		Zakir Othman 47pen

Kedah	2–0	Kelantan TNB
Akmal Rizal Rakhli 41pen, Cik Hisamuddin Hassan 89

Johor	3–0	Kedah JKR
Azmil Azali 8, Roland Nemeth 17, Khairul Ismail 33

Brunei	3–2	Melaka Telekom
Saifful Rizal Awang 3, Irwan Mohamad 17, Rafael Akakpo 55		Azlan Ahmad 14, Isaac Kuffour 68

Selangor Public Bank	2–1	KL Malay Mail
Marek Svec 62, M.Subramaniam 89pen		S.Sangar 47

=== Round 5 ===
[Feb 18]

Johor	1–3	Kelantan TNB
L.Ragesh 60		Wan Kamarulzaman Mohd 12, Azrul Amri Borhan 72, Khairul Zalazmi Zahinuden 75

Police	1–5	Kedah
L.Suresh 78pen		Sheikh Redzuan Abu Bakar 36, 43, 59, Akmal Rizal Rakhli 86, Irwan Fadzly Idrus 90

Kelantan SKMK	1–2	Selangor MPPJ
Shahrul Azaruddin Nordin 62pen		Yuzaiman Zahari 23, Khairon Haled Masron 60

Melaka Telekom	4–0	KL Malay Mail
Imran Ahmad 6, Isaac Kuffour 60, 63, Gabriel Opoku-Ware 85

Kedah JKR	3–0	Brunei
Ahmad Rodi Din 65, 75, Shahril Dahlan 88

Armed Forces	3–0	Selangor Public Bank
Ya'kob Aris 60, Shahrol Imran Ibrahim 75, Che Abdullah Che Ahmad 78

=== Round 6 ===
[Feb 25]

Kelantan SKMK	3–0	Armed Forces
Yunainan Dolah 27, 82, Nurul Azmie Roya 35

Kedah	1–0	Selangor MPPJ
Akmal Rizal Rakhli 22

Johor	3–1	Police
Suhaimi Jamil 69, Farid Ideris 71, Khairul Ismail 89		Bonny Winson 8

Brunei	2–1	Kelantan TNB
Irwan Mohamad 22, Awangku Shahrom Ismail 37		Harizul Izwan Rani 89

KL Malay Mail	0–0	Kedah JKR

Selangor Public Bank	1–1	Melaka Telekom
Marek Svec 7		Imran Ahmad 76

=== Round 7 ===
[Mar 1]

Kelantan TNB	2–0	KL Malay Mail
Azman Ismail 21, Ahmad Tahrin Yusoff 89

Police	0–1	Brunei
		Saifful Rizal Awang 1

Johor	1–2	Selangor MPPJ
Azlan Meri 53og		Aiman Firdaus Tan 43, Zaki Yusoff 55

Kedah JKR	0–1	Selangor Public Bank
		Marek Svec 69

Armed Forces	1–0	Melaka Telekom
Shahrol Imran Ibrahim 88

[Mar 2]

Kedah	4–0	Kelantan SKMK
Amirul Nizam Mahadzir 50, Cik Hisamuddin Hassan 53, Akmal Rizal Rakhli 76pen, Sheikh Redzuan Abu Bakar 87

=== Round 8 ===
[Mar 8]

Kedah	5–1	Armed Forces
Manzoor Azwira Wahid 20, 36, Cik Hisamuddin Hassan 56, Liew Kit Kong 57, Amirul Nizam Mahadzir 89		Ya'kob Aris 8

Kelantan SKMK	2–1	Johor
Anuar Abdul Roni 20, Nurul Azmie Roya 59		Mohamed Shahril Nizam 53

Brunei	2–0	Selangor MPPJ
Riwandi Wahit 51, 66

KL Malay Mail	0–3	Police
		Faizal Asmar 13, 24, 31

Selangor Public Bank	2–0	Kelantan TNB
Marek Svec 13, 44

Melaka Telekom	5–1	Kedah JKR
Isaac Kuffour 35, 71, 78, Lai Ban Huat 43, Hardi Jaafar 85		Khamal Idris Ali 53pen

=== Round 9 ===
[Mar 18]

Melaka Telekom	4–1	Kelantan TNB
Isaac Kuffour 3, Rosli Hasyim 36, S.Ramesh 49, Azlan Ahmad 80		Hamdi Ibrahim 5

Police	1–2	Selangor Public Bank
Theophilus Ammo 72		Marek Svec 19, Marek Najman 44

Selangor MPPJ	1–1	KL Malay Mail
Ahmad Norafandy Yatim 76		A.Pugelenthi 45

Kelantan SKMK	0–0	Brunei

Kedah	1–0	Johor
Rafdi Rashid 74

Armed Forces	2–1	Kedah JKR
Zahid Hashim 58, Naszli Abu Bakar 87		Khamal Idris Ali 81pen

=== Round 10 ===
[Mar 22]

Johor	5–1	Armed Forces
Abu Bakar Mahmood 10og, Roland Nemeth 23, 50pen, Khairul Ismail 26, Farid Ideris 30		Shahrul Imran Ibrahim 88

Brunei	0–4	Kedah
		Rafdi Rashid 45, Akmal Rizal Rakhli 74, 87, 90

KL Malay Mail	0–0	Kelantan SKMK

Selangor Public Bank	1–2	Selangor MPPJ
G.Rameswaran 60		Khairul Anhar Taam 75pen, Ahmad Norafandy Yatim 96

Melaka Telekom	5–2	Police
Rosli Hasyim 30, 37, Isaac Kuffour 35, 67pen, Adnan Zin		Raja Azlan Shah Raja Yahya 58, Faizal Asmar 87

Kedah JKR	2–1	Kelantan TNB
Fahmi Abdul Aziz 15, Shahroni Che Ahmad 85pen		Morhim Abdullah 71pen

=== Round 11 ===
[Mar 25]

Armed Forces	0–4	Kelantan TNB
		Morhim Abdullah 22, Badrisan Kadir 54, 67, 69

Police	3–1	Kedah JKR
Faizal Asmar 10, Rohaizan Ribi 53, Izwan Baharuddin 86		B.Ponnambalam 27

Selangor MPPJ	1–2	Melaka Telekom
Khairun Haled Masrom 17		Isaac Kuffour 33pen, Gabriel Opoku-Ware 49

Kelantan SKMK	2–1	Selangor Public Bank
Bukini Dollah 82, Anuar Abdul Roni 88		Paul Raj 52

Kedah	0–0	KL Malay Mail

Johor	2–2	Brunei
Roland Nemeth 17, Farid Ideris 35		Irwan Mohamad 65, Abang Norsillmy Taha 72

=== Round 12 ===
[Apr 1]

Brunei	1–3	Johor
Abang Norsillmy Taha 61		Farid Ideris 36, 44, Affendy Zamzam 51

KL Malay Mail	0–3	Kedah
		Akmal Rizal Rakhli 48, Zainuddin Ariffin 62, Liew Kit Kong 89

Selangor Public Bank	2–0	Kelantan SKMK
Marek Svec 16, M.Chandran 77

Melaka Telekom	2–0	Selangor MPPJ
Isaac Kuffour 64pen, Rosli Hasyim 74

Kedah JKR	0–1	Police
		Rohaizan Ribi 12

Kelantan TNB	2–3	Armed Forces
Zalghafari Manaf 46, Junaidi Daud 59		Zahid Hashim 61pen, Endrew Lawadin 71, Yuzaidee Rejab 88

=== Round 13 ===
[Apr 5]

Selangor MPPJ	2–0	Kedah JKR
Khairul Anhar Taam 7, Mohd Fadzly Aziz 43

Kelantan SKMK	2–2	Melaka Telekom
Yunainan Dollah 56, Shahrul Azaruddin 71		Isaac Kuffour 12, 88pen

Kedah	1–1	Selangor Public Bank
Zainuddin Ariffin 55		U.Ganeson 14

Johor	1–0	KL Malay Mail
Suhaimi Jamil 11

Armed Forces	3–3	Brunei
Zahid Hashim 21, Endrew Lawadin 35, Shahrul Imran Ibrahim 71		Marcus Philips 39pen, Abang Norsillmy Taha 55, Awangku Sharom Ismail 81

[Apr 6]

Police	1–0	Kelantan TNB
Bonny Winson Anthony Gak 56

=== Round 14 ===
[Apr 12]

Kelantan TNB	0–1	Selangor MPPJ
		Fadzly Abdul Aziz 62

Brunei	2–0	KL Malay Mail
Gueorgui Guerguiev 25, Irwan Mohamad 84

Selangor Public Bank	2–1	Johor
M.Chandran 20, Marek Svec 59		Affendy Zamzam 48

Melaka Telekom	2–0	Kedah
Azlan Ahmad 61, Imran Ahmad 66

Kedah JKR	3–0	Kelantan SKMK
Shahril Dahlan 60, Shahfizan Hashim 77, Khamal Idris Ali 88

Armed Forces	1–2	Police
Kelvin Samuel 88		Raja Azlan Shah Yahaya 37, Izwan Baharuddin 84

=== Round 15 ===
[Apr 19]

Selangor MPPJ	0–1	Police
		Theophilus Ammo 3

Kelantan SKMK	2–1	Kelantan TNB
Zahariman Ghazali 67, Yunainan Dollah 80		Mohd Khairul Anwar 54pen

Johor	2–3	Melaka Telekom
Farid Ideris 13, Khairul Ismail 66		Azmi Che Ngah 33, Isaac Kuffour 64, 80

Selangor Public Bank	2–2	Brunei
Paul Raj 44, M.Chandran 49		Silas Liberto Da Silva 40, 86

KL Malay Mail	1–0	Armed Forces
S.Sangar 30

[Apr 20]

Kedah	1–1	Kedah JKR
Zainuddin Ariffin 76		Amran Mahmud 25

=== Round 16 ===
[Apr 29]

Kelantan TNB	1–2	Kedah
Abdul Latif Jusoh 3		Sariman Che Omar 26, Akmal Rizal Rakhli 83

Police	0–0	Kelantan SKMK

KL Malay Mail	0–2	Selangor Public Bank
		Paul Raj 11, 60

Melaka Telekom	4–1	Brunei
Isaac Kuffour 14pen, 86, Khairul Anuar Baharom 56, Imran Ahmad 90		Silas Liberto da Silva 53

Kedah JKR	0–3	Johor
		Daniel Watkins 43, 55, Suhaimi Jamil 60

[Apr 30]

Selangor MPPJ	2–0	Armed Forces
Juan Manuel Arostegui 42, Ahmad Norafandy Yatim 53

=== Round 17 ===
[May 3]

Selangor MPPJ	2–0	Kelantan SKMK
Ahmad Norafandy Yatim 39, Khairul Anhar Taam 85pen

Kedah	3–1	Police
Liew Kit Kong 8, Rafdi Rashid 40, Manzoor Azwira Wahid 89		Izwan Baharuddin 73

Kelantan TNB	0–6	Johor
		Farid Ideris 26, Daniel Watkins 29, 58, 61pen, Suhaimi Jamil 38, L.Ragesh 73

Brunei	5–2	Kedah JKR
Gueorgui Georguiev 1, Irwan Mohamad 12, 33, Subuhi Abdillah Bakir 39, Fadlin Gelawat 74		Ahmad Rodi Din 76, Fariz Yahaya 86

KL Malay Mail	0–5	Melaka Telekom
		Azlan Ahmad 24, 44, 67, Isaac Kuffour 26, 45

Selangor Public Bank	5–4	Armed Forces
Zulkipli Chek Din 8, Zakaria Ismail 47, Paul Raj 56, 63, 82		Hasli Rosdi Mat Yusof 5, Zahid Hashim 28, 90, Ya'kob Aris 46

=== Round 18 ===
[May 10]

Kelantan TNB	1–3	Brunei
Azrul Amri Borhan 4		Guergui Gueorguiev 14, 55, Abang Norsillmy Taha 79

Selangor MPPJ	1–0	Kedah
Juan Manuel Arostegui 78

Melaka Telekom	1–0	Selangor Public Bank
Gabriel Opoku-Ware 10

Kedah JKR	1–3	KL Malay Mail
Tan Gim Hong 30		Juzuli Baili 79, S.Sangar 82, M.Pavalamani 88pen

[May 17]

Armed Forces	1–1	Kelantan SKMK
Endrew Lawadin 70		Merzega Abdel Hay 11

[Jun 3]

Police	1–0	Johor
Faizal Asmar 76

=== Round 19 ===
[May 27]

Kelantan SKMK	0–5	Kedah
		Shawal Johadi 14, Rafdi Rashid 23, Akmal Rizal Rakhli 36, Matar Diop 38, Liew Kit Kong 87

Selangor MPPJ	1–2	Johor
Ahmad Norafandy Yatim 77		Farid Ideris 8, Gabriel Mendez 81

Brunei	3–1	Police
Silas Liberto Da Silva 24, Fadlin Gelawat 72, Riwandi Wahit 78		Rohaizan Ribi 67

KL Malay Mail	0–1	Kelantan TNB
		Mohd Sham Mohd Noor 87

Selangor Public Bank	4–1	Kedah JKR
Paul Raj 48, Athan Raj 60, Ivan Ziga 65, Marek Svec 74		Shahimi Abdul Rahim 43

Melaka Telekom	1–1	Armed Forces
Isaac Kuffour 54pen		Ya'kob Aris 35

=== Round 20 ===
[Jun 7]

Kelantan TNB	3–3	Selangor Public Bank
M.Elango 70, Zakri Bidi 71, 79		Zakaria Ismail 26, 28, Marek Svec 30

Police	1–0	KL Malay Mail
Faizal Asmar 86

Selangor MPPJ	5–4	Brunei
Ahmad Norafandy Yatim 20, 83, Juan Manuel Arostegui 21, 50, Zaki Yusoff 61		Abang Norsillmy Taha 14, Gueorgui Gueorguiev 16, 70, Silas Liberto Da Silva 30

Johor	5–1	Kelantan SKMK
Suhaimi Jamil 12, 17, Affendy Zamzam 44, 50, Gabriel Mendez 90		Mohamad Abdullah 4

Kedah JKR	1–1	Melaka Telekom
Farouk Ismail 45		Khairul Anuar Baharom 11

Armed Forces	1–2	Kedah
Ya'kob Aris 44		Rafdi Rashid 31, Matar Diop 77

=== Round 21 ===
[Jun 14]

Johor	1–1	Kedah
Affendy Zamzam 16		Rafdi Rashid 35

Brunei	3–1	Kelantan SKMK
Subuhi Abdillah Bakir 37, Sharimin Sharbini 66, Abang Norsillmy Taha 69		Bukini Dollah 39

KL Malay Mail	0–4	Selangor MPPJ
		Khairul Anhar Taam 14, Juan Manuel Arostegui 21, 36, 65

Selangor Public Bank	2–2	Police
Marek Svec 26, Nor Azman Mohamed 37		J.Manogaran 3, Faizal Asmar 60

Kelantan TNB	0–1	Melaka Telekom
		Isaac Kuffour 71

Kedah JKR	0–2	Armed Forces
		Ya'kob Aris 3, 16

=== Round 22 ===
[Jun 17]

Police	0–3	Melaka Telekom
		Azlan Ahmad 37, 76, Shaheful Ardan Adnan 81

Selangor MPPJ	3–0	Selangor Public Bank
Juan Manuel Arostegui 11, 62, 73

Kelantan SKMK	0–0	KL Malay Mail

Kedah	1–1	Brunei
Cik Hisamuddin Hassan 67		Silas Liberto Da Silva 53

Armed Forces	1–3	Johor
Che Abdullah Che Ahmad 79		Daniel Watkins 28, 37, Junaidi Latif 33

[Jun 18]

Kelantan TNB	4–2	Kedah JKR

== Champions ==
2002 Liga Perdana 2 champion

Kedah
2nd title
