= Mohd Anis Faron =

Malaysian footballer

Personal information
- Full name: Mohd Anis Faron bin Ahmad Arsidi
- Date of birth: 9 November 1982 (age 44)
- Place of birth: Perak, Malaysia
- Height: 1.81 m (5 ft 11 1/2 in)
- Position: Goalkeeper

Youth career
- 2000–2001: Perak FA

Senior career*
| Years | Team | Apps | (Gls) |
| 2002–2003 | Perak TKN FC | | |
| 2004–2005 | Perlis FA | | |
| 2005–2006 | Sabah FA | | |
| 2006–2008 | Selangor FA | | |
| 2008–2012 | Johor FC | | |
| 2013 | Felda United FC | | |
| 2014–2015 | Johor Darul Takzim II F.C. | | |

International career^{‡}
| 2003–2005 | Malaysia U-23 | | |
- * Club domestic league appearances and goals as of 20 June 2011 ‡ National team caps and goals as of 20 June 2011

Mohd Anis Faron bin Ahmad Arsidi or better known as Mohd Anis Faron (born 9 November 1982) is a Malaysian footballer who plays as a goalkeeper.

== Career ==
Mohd Anis Faron started his professional career in Perak youth teams. He joined a Perak-based club Perak TKN FC in 2002 where he was installed as the first choice goalkeeper, before departing to Perlis in 2004. Later, he played for Sabah FA and Selangor FA, before joining Johor FC in 2008. After released by Johor FC at the end of 2012, Anis played for Felda United FC in 2013, before returning to Johor to join Johor Darul Takzim II F.C. in April 2014. He played for the club until April 2015, when he was sacked following his court case, charged with verbally assaulting a police officer in Penang's City Stadium after a league match against Penang FA.

He has played for the Malaysia national under-23 football team.
