= Mohamed Moustapha N'diaye =

Senegalese footballer

Mohamed Moustapha Mane
Personal information
- Full name: Mouhamad Moustapha Mane
- Date of birth: January 19, 1984 (age 42)
- Place of birth: Guédiawaye, Senegal
- Height: 1.89 m (6 ft 2 1/2 in)
- Position: Striker

Youth career
- 1995–2002: Dakar UC

Senior career*
Years	Team	Apps	(Gls)
2003	Dakar UC	34	(9)
2004–2007	Etecom F.C. Lome	110	(32)
2008	Kelantan FA	33	(32)
2009	Muang Thong United	3	(0)
2009–2011	Hoang Anh Gia Lai		
2011	AS Pikine		
- * Club domestic league appearances and goals as of 14 November 2008

Mohamed Moustapha Mané (born 19 January 1984 in Dakar) is a retired Senegalese footballer who last played for AS Pikine.

== Honours ==
- Malaysia Premier League 2007-08 Top Scorers with Kelantan FA -27 goals
