= Kelana United F.C. =

Malaysian football club

Kelana United
- Full name: Kelana United Football Club
- Short name: KUFC
- Founded: 2019; 6 years ago
- Ground: Arena MBSJ
- Capacity: 1,000
- President: Datuk Rosal Azimin Ahmad
- Head coach: Fairuz Montana
- League: Selangor League
Home colours	Away colours

Kelana United Football Club, simply known as Kelana United, is a Malaysian football club based in Kelana Jaya, Selangor, which plays in the Selangor League. Tengku Shariffuddin Shah Tengku Sulaiman Shah acts as a patron of the club. The club's home ground is the 1,000-capacity Arena MBSJ.

== History ==
Founded in 2019, the club joined several competitions organized by the Football Association of Selangor. The men’s senior team secured a major milestone in 2023 by winning the FAS Division 1 title, defeating Putra Perwira FC 1–0 in the final. This victory earned them promotion to the FAS Super League, positioning Kelana United among the top amateur teams in Selangor’s competitive football scene.

== Technical staff ==
As of 5 July 2024

- Team manager: (Malaysia) Nor Syazwani Din
- Assistant team manager: (Malaysia) Shaiful Yazan Kamaruddin
- Head coach: (Malaysia) Fairuz Montana
- Goalkeeping coach: (Malaysia) Mohd Fahmi Mohd Isa
- Physio: (Malaysia) Mohd Nazir Shaharuddin
- Kitman: (Malaysia) Mohamad Ashraf Ahmad Hisham

== Honours ==
=== Domestic competitions ===
- FAS Premier League

(gold) Winners (1): 2023
