= Perak League =

- Founded: 1932; 93 years ago
- Country: Malaysia
- Confederation: Perak Football Association
- Number of clubs: 16
- Level on pyramid: 4
- Promotion to: Malaysia A2 Amateur League
- Current: 2025–26 Perak League

The Perak League is the state football league in Perak. It is the fourth-tier league in the Malaysian football league system. The league is managed by PAFA and was established in 1932.

== History ==
=== Origin ===
The first known records of the Perak League are from 1932. The champion for that year was Perak Chinese RC. In 2014 and 2015, the tournament of the Perak Amanjaya League was held with twenty-four district teams. The league which was known as the PAFA President Cup, and a total of sixteen teams participated in the league for 2016 season.

=== 2014 Perak League ===
2014 was the first season of the Perak Amanjaya League. The tournament was held from September 13 to October 2. A total of 24 teams were divided into eight groups of three, followed by the semi-finals and final to decide the winners. The 2014 edition was won by Lumut.

=== 2015 Perak League ===
2015 was the Perak Amanjaya League's second season. The tournament was held from September 22 to November 7. As in 2014, 24 teams competed for the trophy. The 2015 edition was won by Ipoh Timor.

=== 2016 Perak League ===
Beginning with the 2016 season, the league was revamped as PAFA President Cup. 16 teams participated in the league.

District	Team
Hulu Perak	Gerik, Lenggong
Kuala Kangsar	Kuala Kangsar
Kerian	Kerian
Kinta	Ipoh, Batu Gajah
Kampar	Kampar
Perak Tengah	Perak Tengah, Kampung Gajah
Manjung	Manjung
Batang Padang	Batang Padang
Muallim	Tanjung Malim
Hilir Perak	Hilir Perak

=== Groups ===
- Group A
  - Ipoh
  - Kampung Gajah
  - Kampar
  - Batu Gajah
- Group B
  - Tanjung Malim
  - Kerian
  - Gerik
  - PCRC
- Group C
  - Perak Tengah
  - Lenggong
  - Batang Padang
  - MSIP
- Group D
  - Hilir Perak
  - Melayu Perak
  - Kuala Kangsar
  - Manjung
