= Adabi Consumer Industries =

Malaysian food manufacturing company

Adabi Consumer Industries Sdn. Bhd.
- Company type: Private
- Industry: Foods
- Founded: March 1984; 42 years ago
- Founder: Dato’ Syed Manshor Syed Mahmood
- Headquarters: Rawang, Selangor, Malaysia
- Key people: Adrian Roslan (President)
- Products: Curry products, soups, flour, mixers, sauces, canned foods, etc.
- Owner: Adabi Group
- Website: www.adabi.com

Adabi Consumer Industries Sdn. Bhd. (known as Adabi; stylized in the logo as adabi) is a Malaysian food manufacturing company. Established in 1984 by Dato’ Syed Manshor Syed Mahmood, the company specializing in manufacturing food products including sauces and spices. Its headquarters is located at Rawang, Selangor, Malaysia. Known for its philosophy, Sajian Istana di Zaman Silam (Palace Dishes in the Past), the official slogan of the company is Bersih dan Asli (transl. Pure and Authentic).

== History and products ==
Adabi was founded by Dato’ Syed Manshor Syed Mahmood in March 1984. The company has produced more than 80 products with various food categories under the company’s corporate name.

== Television ==
- Jaguh Kampung (Astro Prima)
- Spice Routes (TV3)
