= Juan Arostegui =

Argentine footballer

Juan Manuel Arostegui
Personal information
- Full name: Juan Manuel Arostegui
- Date of birth: 2 December 1980 (age 45)
- Place of birth: San Francisco, Córdoba, Argentina
- Height: 1.84 m (6 ft 0 in)
- Position: Forward

Youth career
- 1997: Boca Juniors

Senior career*
Years	Team	Apps	(Gls)
1998–2000	Boca Juniors	3	(0)
2000–2001	El Porvenir	27	(8)
2001–2002	Belgrano de Cordoba	5	(2)
2003–2004	MPPJ FC	37	(33)
2004	Pachuca	14	(6)
2005	Sportivo Belgrano	14	(6)
2006	Universidad Catolica	11	(5)
2006	MPPJ FC	19	(17)
2007	Salernitana	9	(0)
2007–2008	UD Vecindario	34	(7)
2008–2009	Chacarita Juniors	44	(10)
2010	Aldosivi	16	(6)
2010–2014	Sportivo Belgrano	102	(54)
2014–2015	ATM FA	14	(8)
2015–2018	Sportivo Belgrano	101	(35)
Total		450	(197)
- * Club domestic league appearances and goals

Juan Manuel Arostegui (born 2 December 1980 in San Francisco, Córdoba) is a professional Argentine football player. He played for Boca Juniors as well as the Argentina Youth World Cup team.

Arostegui is a former player for MPPJ FC in the Malaysian Super League. With the club he scored 50 goals for MPPJ FC in all competitions in the 2003 season. This was capped off by a hat-trick in the 3–0 win against Sabah FA in the 2003 Malaysia Cup final held in National Stadium, Bukit Jalil, Kuala Lumpur.

The win earned the Petaling Jaya club the accolade of being the only football club in Malaysia to ever win the prestigious Malaysia Cup trophy (all previous winners were state sides of Malaysia).
