= TKN F.C. =

Malaysian football club

Thang Kiang Nam
- Full name: Thang Kiang Nam Football Club
- Ground: Perak Stadium, Ipoh
- Capacity: 40,000
- Owner: Thang Kiang Nam Trading Sdn. Bhd.

Thang Kiang Nam Football Club or TKN FC was a Malaysian football club based in Ipoh, Perak. The club used to play in the Malaysian League before withdrawing their participation in 2004. Owned by Thang Kiang Nam Trading Sdn. Bhd., the club played its home matches at the Perak Stadium.

== History ==
TKN FC withrew after finishing last in the 2003 Malaysia Premier League 2. Following their withrawal, the club returned to the State League. Most notable player who represented TKN FC was goalkeeper Mohd Anis Faron, who played for the club from 2002 to 2003.
