= 2003 Liga Perdana 2 =

- Season: 2003
- Champions: Public Bank; 1st title
- Matches played: 264

The 2003 Liga Perdana 2 was the sixth and final season of the Liga Perdana 2. A total of 12 teams participated in the season.

Kuala Lumpur and Negeri Sembilan were relegated from Liga Perdana 1 to join the Liga Perdana 2. The season kicked off on 10 February 2003. Public Bank won the title and the playoff for the Malaysia Super League.

== Teams ==
12 teams competing in the sixth season of Liga Perdana 2.

- (Selangor) Public Bank (2003 Liga Perdana 2 champions)
- Negeri Sembilan
- Johor
- (Selangor) MPPJ FC
- Brunei
- Kuala Lumpur
- Kelantan SKMK
- (Malaysia) PDRM
- Kelantan TNB
- (Malaysia) ATM
- Kelantan JPS
- Perak TKN

== League table ==
=== League table ===
| Pos | Team | Pld | W | D | L | GF | GA | GD | Pts | Qualification or relegation |
|---|---|---|---|---|---|---|---|---|---|---|
| 1 | (Selangor) Public Bank (C) | 22 | 17 | 2 | 3 | 69 | 28 | +41 | 53 | Promoted to the Super League |
| 2 | Negeri Sembilan | 22 | 12 | 6 | 4 | 59 | 28 | +31 | 42 | |
| 3 | Johor | 22 | 12 | 4 | 6 | 39 | 30 | +9 | 40 | |
| 4 | (Selangor) MPPJ FC | 22 | 12 | 3 | 7 | 64 | 38 | +26 | 39 | |
| 5 | Brunei | 22 | 12 | 3 | 7 | 45 | 31 | +14 | 39 | |
| 6 | Kuala Lumpur | 22 | 8 | 7 | 7 | 46 | 36 | +10 | 31 | |
| 7 | Kelantan SKMK | 22 | 8 | 7 | 7 | 36 | 35 | +1 | 31 | |
| 8 | (Malaysia) PDRM | 22 | 7 | 7 | 8 | 40 | 47 | −7 | 28 | |
| 9 | Kelantan TNB | 22 | 6 | 6 | 10 | 31 | 42 | −11 | 24 | |
| 10 | (Malaysia) ATM | 22 | 5 | 4 | 13 | 22 | 50 | −28 | 19 | |
| 11 | Kelantan JPS | 22 | 5 | 3 | 14 | 27 | 62 | −35 | 18 | |
| 12 | Perak TKN | 22 | 1 | 2 | 19 | 20 | 71 | −51 | 5 | Relegated to Liga FAM |

Rules for classification: 1) Points; 2) Goal difference; 3) Number of goals scored.
(C) League Champion

== Champions ==
2003 Liga Perdana 2 champions

Public Bank
1st title
