= 2000 Liga Perdana 2 =

- Season: 2000
- Champions: Kelantan; 1st title
- Promoted: Kelantan; Malacca
- Matches played: 180

The 2000 Liga Perdana 2 was the third season of the Liga Perdana 2. A total of ten teams participated in the league. The season kicked off on 14 April 2000.

== Teams ==
Ten teams competing in the third season of Liga Perdana 2.

- Kelantan (2000 Liga Perdana 2 champions)
- Malacca
- Kedah
- Kelantan JKR
- Kelantan TNB
- (Malaysia) ATM
- Johor FC
- (Malacca) TMFC
- (Kuala Lumpur) KL Malay Mail
- (Negeri Sembilan) NS Chempaka

== League table ==
1.Kelantan - 36 PTS (2000 Liga Perdana 2 Champions)

2.Malacca - 33 PTS (Promoted to Liga Perdana 1)

3.Kedah - 30 PTS

4.Kelantan JKR - 28 PTS

5.Kelantan TNB - 23 PTS

6.ATM - 22 PTS

7.Johor FC - 21 PTS

8.TMFC - 20 PTS

9.KL Malay Mail - 17 PTS

10.NS Chempaka - 13 PTS

== Champions ==
2000 Liga Perdana 2 champion

Kelantan
1st title
