= Selangor League =

Malaysia state level football league

FA Selangor League
- Founded: 1936; 90 years ago
- Country: Malaysia
- Confederation: AFC
- Divisions: FAS Super League; FAS Premier League; FAS League Division 1 FAS League Division 2
- Number of clubs: 70 (men); 13 (women)
- Feeder to: Malaysia A3 Community League
- Domestic cup: Malaysia FA Cup
- League cup(s): FAS Charity Cup (Note: A cup match between FAS Super League winners against Selangor Champions League winners); Selangor Champions League; FAS FA Cup; FAS Women's FA Cup
- Website: FA Selangor.my
- Current: 2026

The FA Selangor League is the overall state-level football league in Selangor. It is the 5th-8th level in the Malaysian football league system. The league is managed by the Football Association of Selangor (FAS). The league was established with the earliest known records from 1935.

The league has undergone multiple iterations until its current structure took place. The top-tier division is the FA Selangor Super League, followed by the second-tier FA Selangor Premier League, the third-tier FA Selangor Division 1, and the fourth-tier FA Selangor League Division 2.

== History ==
=== Origin ===
The Selangor Football League started as the Selangor Amateur Football League in 1905. The first known record of the league was in 1935, where the champions were Rangers. Even though the league was relatively unknown to outsiders, the Selangor state has been a source of clubs for the national league for years.

=== Football Selangor ===
Tengku Amir Shah, Raja Muda of Selangor created the Selangor Youth Community (SAY) which aims to help the development of youth in Selangor in the fields of entrepreneurship, art & creativity, sports and community service. In 2016, SAY introduced the Selangor Champions League (SCL), which brought together champions from various state amateur leagues to compete for the title of the best amateur team in Selangor.

In 2017, the idea to establish Football Selangor (FS) was born; an organization created to unite the amateur football community in Selangor. FS also launched the Affiliate League Program which was joined by 27 social & amateur leagues throughout Selangor. This program has paved the way to SCL for more teams in the Darul Ehsan state.

The organization of SCL, driven by the grassroots football community itself, has proven that the social & amateur league scene can be raised to a more prestigious level. The 2017 SCL final was held at the Shah Alam Stadium, which became the highest motivation for every amateur team to perform at the sacred stadium of the Selangor Darul Ehsan team.In addition, the amateur football scene went to a new level when for the first time the Malaysian Amateur Cup competition was held. The collaboration between the Terengganu Amateur League and the Selangor Champions League saw the best players from their respective leagues clash at the Shah Alam Stadium. TAL All Stars lifted the title after defeating SCL All Stars 2–0.

The Shah Alam Stadium witnessed the championship for 2018 won by Puchong Fuerza FC, defeating KRU FC in front of ultras fans. In 2019, Football Selangor witnessed the restructuring of the FAS League. In addition to that, the FAS Junior League was conducted, involving teams for under-14 and under-17 categories.

The 2019 Selangor Champions League saw improved organization from various aspects, including live broadcasts. The development efforts were initiated by His Highness the Young Ruler of Selangor.

== Competition structure ==
=== Men's ===
Level	Total teams	League(s) / Division(s)
1 (5)	20	FAS Super League ↓ 2 relegations
2 (6)	16	FAS Premier League ↑ 2 promotions ↓ 2 relegations
3 (7)	18	FAS League Division 1 ↑ 2 promotions ↓ 2 relegations
4 (8)	16	FAS League Division 2 ↑ 2 promotions

=== Women's ===
Level	Total teams	League(s) / Division(s)
1	13	FAS Women's Super League

== Current teams ==
Below are the member teams of the FA Selangor League for the 2026 season.

=== FAS Super League ===
- BOSS
- Bukit Rotan Baru
- Gombak FA
- KKB Brotherhood
- KRU
- MBDK
- MBPJ
- MBSA
- MBSJ
- Mozyda
- MP Sepang
- MPKj
- NPNG
- Perlima United
- PNSB
- SA United
- SFC Youth
- Smart-Focus
- Sri Setia Putra
- Teleflow

=== FAS Premier League ===
- Anak Kalumpang
- ASFC
- Birchwood Jr
- Bukit Kuching
- Genpro
- Klasiko
- KS TPCA
- Malaysian Airports
- PIB
- Port Rangers
- Puchong Hunters
- Puchong Rangers
- Putra Perwira
- Sharpees
- Tanjong Karang
- UITM United II

=== FAS League Division 1 ===
- AAK
- AU2
- Forza Maju Jaya
- Hypernova
- Kenali Yakin
- Kg. Jawa Brothers
- Kingstown Klang
- MAS
- MY World
- Najmi SFFC
- Nilam Puri
- Nossa
- PKNS FC
- Soccer Ace
- Sternen
- Sun Riders
- Sunday Cowboys
- Vulcans

=== FAS League Division 2 ===
- Belia Tamil PJ
- Bidara
- FC Serayan
- ISMA Shah Alam
- Jr. Bangi
- Klang Gate
- KSB Padang Jawa
- Lighthouse
- MMU FC
- Puchong Rovers
- Shah Alam City
- SIA
- Sijangkang
- SSN-SFC U17
- Tunas Lagenda
- Turi

== List of champions ==
=== FAS League ===
List of FAS Leagues champions
Ed.	Season	Super League	Premier League	Division 1	Division 2
1	2019	NPNG FC	PIB FC	Not exists	
1	2019	NPNG FC	MBPJ FC	Not exists	
1	2019	NPNG FC	Kingstown Klang	Not exists	
–	2020	Competitions abandoned due to COVID-19 pandemic in Malaysia			
–	2021	Not held (Note: In 2021, the FAS League has been replaced by the FAS Return To Play, which is a series of pre-season matches.)			
2	2022	NPNG FC	MP Sepang	Kelana United	Puchong Hunters
3	2023	MBSA FC	Kelana United	KRU FC	KKB Brotherhood
4	2024	MPKj FC	KRU FC	Perlima United	Klasiko FC
5	2025	MPKj FC	Perlima United	Bukit Kuching	AAK Puncak Alam
6	2026	MBSA FC	UiTM United II	AAK Puncak Alam	SSN-SFC U17

=== Selangor FA Cup (Tan Sri Mustapha Kamal Cup) ===
List of Selangor FA Cup finals
Ed.	Year	Winners	Score	Runners-up	Venue	Date
1	2023	MP Sepang	1–1 (5–4p)	Selangor FC Youth	Bandar Baru Salak Tinggi Stadium, Sepang	Wednesday, 23 August
2	2024	MBSA FC	0–0 (4–3p)	Kelana United	MBSJ Arena, Subang Jaya	Sunday, 23 June
3	2025	MBSA FC	0–0 (3–2p)	Cyberjaya Teleflow	MPAJ Stadium, Ampang Jaya	Sunday, 20 July
4	2026	Smart-Focus	1–0	MPKj FC	MBSJ Arena, Subang Jaya	Wednesday, 15 July

=== Selangor Champions League ===
List of Selangor Champions League finals
Ed.	Year	Winners	Score	Runners-up	Venue	Date
1	2016	Terrapins	2–1	Rebel FC	MPSJ Stadium, Subang Jaya	Saturday, 12 November
2	2017	Axis-O2 PJ	1–1 (4–1p)	PIB FC	Shah Alam Stadium, Shah Alam	Saturday, 9 December
3	2018	Puchong Fuerza	3–0	KRU Port Klang	Shah Alam Stadium, Shah Alam	Sunday, 16 December
4	2019	Kuala Selangor Batu Dua FC	4–0	Kingstown Klang	Shah Alam Stadium, Shah Alam	Saturday, 14 December
—	2020	Competition not held due to COVID-19 pandemic in Malaysia				
5	2021	Cyberjaya Teleflow	3–1	KRU FC	MBSJ Stadium, Subang Jaya	Saturday, 23 April 2022
6	2022	MPKj FC	3–0	Bandar Putera 2	MBSJ Arena, Subang Jaya	Saturday, 10 December
7	2023	Gombak FA	1–0	Kampung Bharu BOSS	MBSJ Arena, Subang Jaya	Sunday, 10 December
8	2024	Cyberjaya Teleflow	1–0	MPKJ FC	MPAJ Stadium, Ampang Jaya	Sunday, 9 February 2025
9	2025	Klang City Sailors	2–0	Cyberjaya Teleflow	MBSJ Arena, Subang Jaya	Sunday, 15 February 2026

== Titles by team ==
Team	First tier	Second tier	Third tier	Fourth tier	Total titles
NPNG FC	2				2
MPKj FC	2				2
MBSA FC	2				2
Kelana United		1	1		2
KRU FC		1	1		2
Perlima United		1	1		2
PIB FC		1			1
MBPJ FC		1			1
Kingstown Klang		1			1
MP Sepang		1			1
UiTM United II		1			1
AAK Puncak Alam			1	1	2
Bukit Kuching			1		1
Puchong Hunters				1	1
KKB Brotherhood				1	1
Klasiko FC				1	1
SSN-SFC U17				1	1

== Statistics ==
=== Top goalscorers ===
List of FAS League top scorers
Season	League	Player (team)	Goals
2019	Super League	Asare Patrick (NPNG FC)	12
2019	Premier League	Ismail Mamat (MP Klang) and Nuriskandar Hamid (Kingstown Klang)	14
2022	Super League	Firdaus Musa (MPKJ FC)	10
2022	Premier League	Ahsan Hamdani (Malaysia Airports)	9
2022	Division 1	Razman Roslan (Kelana United)	19
2022	Division 2	Partheban Jaganathan (Puchong Hunters)	18
2023	Super League	Rizzham Norman (Gombak FA), Firdaus Musa (MPKj FC), Terrence Marieselvam (MPKj FC) and Faiz Laidin (Sun Riders)	8
2023	Premier League	Radzi Pilus (Bukit Kapar), Fakri Saarani (Kelana United)	9
2023	Division 1	Nuriskandar Hamid (KRU FC)	20
2023	Division 2	Shahriman Shafii (KKB Brotherhood)	17
2024	Super League	Asnan Awal Hisham (NPNG FC)	8
2024	Premier League	Dainei Mat Disa (Selangor U16)	15
2024	Division 1	Faiz Ismail (Perlima United)	9
2024	Division 2	Khairul Abhar Zaidi (Harimau United), Aidil Azman (KSB Padang Jawa)	12
2025	Super League	Syakimi Karim (Kampung Bharu BOSS)	7
2025	Premier League	Danish Zikry (Port Rangers)	?
2025	Division 1	Zulfitri Zin (Bukit Kuching)	?
2025	Division 2	Naufal Akif (AAK Puncak Alam)	?
2026	Super League	Zikry Hafis (MBSA FC)	9
2026	Premier League	Iman Shah Anuar (Klasiko) and Yus Hafiq Iqmal (Malaysian Airports)	10
2026	Division 1	Fareez Danial (Sternen)	10
2026	Division 2	Farhan Hadi (Bidara)	11
