= Liga Perdana 2 =

- Founded: 1998
- Folded: 2003
- Country: Malaysia
- Other club from: Brunei
- Confederation: AFC
- Number of clubs: 12 (from 2001)
- Level on pyramid: 2
- Promotion to: Liga Perdana 1
- Relegation to: Liga FAM
- Domestic cup: Piala FA
- League cup: Piala Malaysia
- Last champions: Public Bank (2003)
- Most championships: 6 teams (1 title)
- Broadcaster(s): RTM
- Current: 2003 Liga Perdana 2

The Liga Perdana 2 or Liga Perdana Dua (English: Premier League Two) was the nation's second-tier professional football league in Malaysia that operated from 1998 to 2003. It was succeeded in 2004 by the formation of Liga Premier. The last champion of the Liga Perdana 2 is Public Bank.

== Champions ==
Below is the list of champions of Liga Perdana 2 since its inception as second-tier league in 1998.

| Year | Champions (number of titles) | Runners-up | Third place |
|---|---|---|---|
| 1998 | Terengganu | Johor | Kelantan |
| 1999 | Johor | Selangor | Johor FC |
| 2000 | Kelantan | (Malacca) Melaka | Kedah |
| 2001 | Johor FC | Sabah FA | (Negeri Sembilan) NS Chempaka F.C. |
| 2002 | Kedah | (Malacca) Telekom Melaka | (Selangor) MPPJ FC |
| 2003 | (Selangor) Public Bank | Negeri Sembilan | Johor FA |

== Golden boot winners ==
| Season | Player | Team | Goals |
|---|---|---|---|
| 1998 | (Ghana) Seidu Issifu | Terengganu FA | 8 |
| 1999 | (Malaysia) Rusdi Suparman | Selangor FA | 15 |
| 2000 | (Malaysia) Anuar Abu Bakar | Kelantan FA | 12 |
| 2001 | (Malaysia) Suharmin Yusuf (Malaysia) Shahrin Abdul Majid | Sabah FA | 12 |
| 2002 | (Ghana) Issac Kuffour | (Malacca) TM FC | 22 |
| 2003 | (Argentina) Juan Manuel Arostegui | (Selangor) MPPJ FC | 33 |
