= MBPJ Selangor F.C. =

MBPJ FC
- Full name: Majlis Bandaraya Petaling Jaya Football Club
- Nickname: The Black Widows
- Founded: 1992; 34 years ago, as MPPJ FC; 2023; 3 years ago, as MBPJ FC
- Ground: Petaling Jaya Stadium
- Capacity: 25,000
- Owner: Petaling Jaya Municipal Council
- Manager: Mohamad Nizuan bin Adziz
- Coach: Ismail Firdaus Khalid
- League: Malaysia A3 Community League; Selangor League
- 2025–26: Third place
- Website: MBPJ FC
Home colours	Away colours

Majlis Bandaraya Petaling Jaya Football Club or Petaling Jaya City Council Football Club, commonly known as MBPJ FC, was a Malaysian professional football club based in Petaling Jaya, Selangor. The club's home ground was the 25,000 capacity Petaling Jaya Stadium. The club used to play in the top division of Malaysian football, the Malaysia Super League until its final season in 2005–06 Malaysia Super League.

It is known as the first club to win the prestigious Malaysia Cup in 2003. The club also has managed to become the champions of 2004 Malaysia Premier League and won the 2004 Sultan Haji Ahmad Shah Cup. The club was owned by the Petaling Jaya Municipal Council which now known as Petaling Jaya City Council (MBPJ).

== History ==
=== Beginnings, ascent and success ===
In the 1990s, MPPJ FC moved up along the ranks of the lower leagues, winning the Selangor state league in 1999. From 2000 to 2002, the club played in the nationwide amateur championship FAM Cup. MPPJ FC was promoted to the second division of Malaysian football, the Malaysia Premier League 2 for the 2002 season.

The pinnacle of their success was when the club won the Malaysia Cup in 2003, beating Sabah 3–0 with a hat-trick by Juan Manuel Arostegui. They became the first club side to win the competition (all previous winners had been sides representing state football associations).

In the next year's Malaysia Cup, the club failed to defend their title as they were knocked out in the group stage. MPPJ FC continued their ascent in the league, being promoted to the newly founded Malaysia Super League in 2005. In their first year, they finished 5th of the 8-members league.

=== Decline and demise ===
From the top of Malaysian football, MPPJ FC suffered a startling and abrupt demise following financial problems in 2006. At the start of the season, the club was nicknamed as the Chelsea of Malaysia, with big budgets towards players transfers and salaries, and also attracting big-name local players. As the season went on, the club failed to deliver on and off the pitch, with key players deserting due to non-payment of salaries and bonuses. By the start of the 2006–07 Malaysia Super League, the club has ceased to exist. Until 2016, the city council has only managed a youth football section under the name of MBPJ.

== Crests and colours ==
2003

2006

== Players ==
=== Women's squad ===
As of 31 May 2026

Note: Flags indicate national team as defined under FIFA eligibility rules; some limited exceptions apply. Players may hold more than one non-FIFA nationality.

No.	Pos.	Nation	Player
1	GK	MAS	Syazliana Jamaluddin
2	DF	MAS	Josephine Angkun
3	MF	MAS	Farah Wahida
4	MF	MAS	Intan Zainal Azhar
5	DF	MAS	Siti Maziah
6	FW	MAS	Thivashini Sivakumar
7	DF	MAS	Atiqah Nik Nadzar
8	MF	MAS	Farahiyah Ridzuan (captain)
9	DF	MAS	Nabila Syahira
10	MF	MAS	Salmi Norain
11	MF	MAS	Siti Nurkhaleeda
12	FW	MAS	Henrietta Justine

No.	Pos.	Nation	Player
13	MF	MAS	Putri Arissa Balqis
14	FW	MAS	Keisha Adelina
15	DF	MAS	Nurul Nadia Roslan
18	MF	MAS	Masturina Auni
19	MF	MAS	Zunadzirah Md Zuzaili
20	GK	MAS	Syazwani Zainal Abidin
22	FW	MAS	Eva Olivianie Antinus
25	DF	MAS	Putri Mia Alysa
27	DF	MAS	Nasuha Nasha
28	MF	MAS	Nurin Batrisyia
33	MF	MAS	Anis Aishah

=== Futsal Women's squad ===
As of 19 January 2026

Note: Flags indicate national team as defined under FIFA eligibility rules; some limited exceptions apply. Players may hold more than one non-FIFA nationality.

No.	Pos.	Nation	Player
1	GK	MAS	Farah Syakira Mohd Saad
2	DF	MAS	Siti Asnidah Zamri
3	MF	MAS	Eva Olivianie Antinus
5	DF	MAS	Thurgasini Kasivisha Nathan
6	FW	MAS	Felicity Agnes Ng
7	DF	MAS	Nur Atiqah Nik Nadzar (captain)
8	MF	MAS	Farahiyah Ridzuan
9	DF	MAS	Nurul Arliana Nabila Ramadhan
10	MF	MAS	Noor Azizah Shahrani

No.	Pos.	Nation	Player
12	FW	MAS	Salmi Norain Agos
13	MF	MAS	Fazira Sani
15	DF	MAS	Norazizah Jamal
16	MF	MAS	Siti Nur Husna Mohd Noh
17	MF	MAS	Hedayah Md Amin
18	MF	MAS	Wan Nadhirah Wan Zainol
19	GK	MAS	Zunadzirah Md Zuzaili
20	MF	MAS	Nor Iradah Kamaruzaman

== Club personnel ==
As of May 2026

Position	Name
Team manager	(Malaysia) Intan Khairana Md Zali (Malaysia) Mohamad Nizuan Adziz
Asst. Team manager	(Malaysia) Marini Mohammad
Head coach	(Malaysia) Ismail Firdaus Khalid
Assistant coach	(Malaysia) Siti Mazidah Mohd Faudzi
Goalkeeping coach	(Malaysia) Anas Nashrullah (Malaysia) Mohamad Nazmi bin Ismail
Fitness coach	(Malaysia) Anas Syafiq (Malaysia) Fatin Harun
Match analyst	(Malaysia) Hamzah Ismail
Team doctor	(Malaysia) Siti Mariam
Physio	(Malaysia) Intan Khairana (Malaysia) Nurul Izzati Azharuddin
Team media	(Malaysia) Muhammad Sayuti bin Jalalludin (Malaysia) Mohd Ridzuan bin Muhammad
Kitman	(Malaysia) Muhammad Anas Syafiq

== Head coaches ==
Coach	Years	Honours
(Malaysia) Reduan Abdullah	1999–2003	2001 Malaysia FAM Cup winner
(Malaysia) Dollah Salleh	2003–2004	2003 Malaysia Cup winner 2004 Piala Sumbangsih winner 2004 Malaysia Premier League winner
(Malaysia) Reduan Abdullah	2005	—N/a
(Germany) Michael Feichtenbeiner	2005–2006	—N/a
(Malaysia) B. Sathianathan	2006 (interim)	—N/a
(Brazil) Toni Netto	2006	—N/a
(Malaysia) Khan Hung Meng	2006	—N/a

== Season by season record ==
Season	Division	Position	Malaysia Cup	Malaysian FA Cup	Malaysian Charity Shield	Regional	Top scorer (all competitions)
2000	Malaysia FAM Cup	3rd (Group B)	DNQ	DNQ	DNQ	DNQ	
2001	Malaysia FAM Cup	Winner	DNQ	First Round	DNQ	DNQ	
2002	Liga Perdana 2	Third place	Quarter-finals	First Round	DNQ	DNQ	(Argentina) Juan Arostegui (12)
2003	Liga Perdana 2	4th place	Winner	Quarter-finals	DNQ	DNQ	(Argentina) Juan Arostegui (46)
2004	Malaysia Premier League	Winner	Group stage	Second Round	Winner	DNQ	(Argentina) Juan Arostegui (16)
2005	Malaysia Super League	5th place	Group stage	First Round	DNQ	DNQ	(Zimbabwe) Newton Ben Katanha (12)
2005–06	Malaysia Super League	5th place	Quarter-finals	Second Round	DNQ	DNQ	(Argentina) Juan Arostegui (17)
2007–2018	Withdrew from Super League and dissolved						
2019	FAS Premier League	Winner	DNQ	DNQ	DNQ	DNQ	
2020–2021	Selangor League	not held due to COVID-19 pandemic					
2021	FAS Super League	6th place	DNQ	DNQ	DNQ	DNQ	
2022	FAS Super League	4th place	DNQ	DNQ	DNQ	DNQ	
2023	FAS Super League	5th place	DNQ	DNQ	DNQ	DNQ	
2024	FAS Super League	5th place	DNQ	DNQ	DNQ	DNQ	
2025–26	A3 Community League	Third place	DNQ	DNQ	DNQ	DNQ	

== Honours ==
=== Domestic competitions ===
==== League ====
- Liga Perdana 2/Liga Premier
  - Winners (1): 2004
  - Third place (1): 2002
- Malaysia FAM Cup
  - Winners (1): 2001
- FAS Premier League
  - Winners (1): 2019
- Malaysia A3 Community League
  - Third place (1): 2025–26

==== Cups ====
- Malaysia Cup
  - Winners (1): 2003
- Sultan Haji Ahmad Shah Cup
  - Winners (1): 2004
- Sultan of Selangor's Cup
  - Winners (1): 2004
