= Azman Ibrahim (football manager) =

Malaysian businessman, programmer, and football manager

- Born: Azman bin Ibrahim; 1 September 1960 (age 65); Kampung Penambang, Kota Bharu, Kelantan
- Education: University of Dallas
- Occupation: Programmer
- Known for: Manager of Kelantan FA

Azman Ibrahim (born 1 September 1960) is a Malaysian businessman, programmer and former manager of Kelantan FA. He became one of the most successful Kelantan's manager when the team clinched their treble in Malaysian football during 2012 season.

== Education ==
- Sekolah Menengah Sultan Ismail, Kota Bharu (1975)
- Bukit Bintang Boys School, Kuala Lumpur (1978)
- Indiana State University, United States (1985)
- University of Dallas, United States (1986)
