= Chris Dawson (footballer, born 1979) =

English-Seychellois footballer

Personal information
- Full name: Chris Dawson
- Date of birth: 22 August 1979 (age 47)
- Place of birth: Coventry, England, United Kingdom
- Position: Midfielder

Team information
- Current team: Bromsgrove Rovers FC

Youth career
- 1996–1998: Bolton Wanderers

Senior career*
Years	Team	Apps	(Gls)
1998–2000	Bolton Wanderers		
2002	Kuala Lumpur FA		
2002–2003	Leigh RMI		
2003–2005	Bromsgrove Rovers FC		

International career^{‡}
2002–2003	Seychelles	4	(0)
- * Club domestic league appearances and goals as of 11 May 2010 ‡ National team caps and goals as of 11 May 2010

Chris Dawson (born 22 August 1979) is a former footballer who played in Europe and Asia, and with the Seychelles national football team.

A midfielder, Dawson played for Bolton Wanderers before leaving England for Malaysia where he played for Kuala Lumpur. After which he returned to England and joined Leigh RMI before moving onto Bromsgrove Rovers FC. Dawson has 4 international caps for the Seychelles.
