= Melaka United F.C. =

Football club in Malaysia

Melaka United
- Full name: Melaka United Football Club
- Nicknames: Hang Tuah; Kancil
- Short name: MUFC
- Founded: 1921; 105 years ago (unofficial); 1924; 102 years ago, as Malacca Amateur FA; 2018; 8 years ago, as Melaka United
- Dissolved: 2022; 4 years ago
- Ground: Hang Jebat Stadium
- Capacity: 40,000
- Owner: Melaka Football Association
- League: Malaysia Super League
- 2022: Malaysia Super League, 10th of 12 (ejected)

Melaka United Football Club (/məˈlɑːkə/) was a Malaysian professional football club based in Malacca that competed in the Malaysia Super League. They were owned by Kenteam Sdn Bhd, which is one of the main nitrile glove producers in Malaysia. Initially, the club's home ground was the Hang Tuah Stadium, before moving to Hang Jebat Stadium in Paya Rumput, Krubong in 2005. The club represented the state of Malacca in Malaysian football competitions. They reached the top division in Malaysian football after back-to-back promotions as champion of the 2015 Malaysia FAM League and the 2016 Malaysia Premier League.

The club was formerly referred to as Malacca or officially as Malacca Amateur FA and Malacca FA. Malacca FA's biggest achievement in Malaysia football was becoming the Malaysian League champion in 1983, led by Asian Football Hall of Fame member Soh Chin Ann.

The club's nickname was Hang Tuah, the name being synonymous with strength and intelligence.

Melaka United's regular kit colours were green and white for shirts, shorts and socks.

== History ==
=== Origins ===
Malacca has sent a football team to play in Malaya Cup since its inaugural season in 1921. In 1924, the team has been registered and now managed by the newly formed governance body of Malacca football, the Malacca Amateur Football Association (MAFA). Since then, the football team has been competing in Malaya Cup and FAM Cup consistently. MAFA biggest achievement when they reached the final 1957 and 1958 FAM Cup led by Robert Choe.

=== The era of amateur football league ===
In 1979, the Football Association of Malaysia (FAM) changed the format of Piala Malaysia when they introduced the league stage that acts as the qualifying round for the knockout stage of Piala Malaysia. It was intended primarily as a qualifying tournament for the final knock-out stages of the Piala Malaysia where teams compete in a one-round league before advanced to the knock-out stage.

The football league in Malaysia has only officially started in 1982, after the introduction of league winners trophy. The league has been known as Liga Malaysia. Malacca football team continued to compete in the league and has become the champion of the league during its second season in 1983 which has been the only time the Malacca team become a champion of the top-tier league in Malaysian football.

=== The era of semi-pro football league ===
Over the years, the league competition has gained important stature in its own right. From 1982 until 1988 the league has an amateur status and continues its purpose as qualifying round for Piala Malaysia. Only in 1989 it is changed to a new format as Liga Semi-Pro (MSPFL), introduced by FAM as a way towards fully professional status. The inaugural season of MSPFL consisted of nine teams in Division I and eight teams in Division II. Malacca has been put in Division II from 1989 to 1992 seasons.

=== Era of professional football ===
MSPFL was the nation's top-tier league until it was succeeded by the Liga Perdana (1994–97). In its inaugural season, 16 teams competed. The teams were based from all states in Malaysia including Malacca, Kuala Lumpur and addition of two teams from Singapore and Brunei.

In 1998, Liga Perdana was divided into two divisions consist of Liga Perdana 1 and Liga Perdana 2. During 1998, Liga Perdana 1 consist of 12 teams while Liga Perdana 2 had 8 teams. Malacca competed in Liga Perdana 2 from 1998 until 2000, before achieving promotion to Liga Perdana 1 for 2001 season.

At this time the league still consisted of semi-pro team where each team was allowed to register 25 players (minimum of 12 professionals for Liga Perdana 1 and 6 professional for Liga Perdana 2).

Malacca competed in Liga Perdana 1 from 2001 until 2003. Football Association of Malaysia (FAM) decided to privatise the league for 2004 season onwards, when the Liga Super was formed.

Teams in Liga Perdana 1 and Liga Perdana 2 were put through a qualification and playoffs to be promoted into the Liga Super. Malacca failed to qualify and was put into a new second-tier Liga Premier for the 2004 season.

=== Playing in Malaysia Premier League ===
The club has been in an up and down performance in Malaysia Premier League since the league inception. They played for three seasons and were promoted to the top-tier Malaysia Super League.

=== Brief year in Malaysia Super League ===
After a successful season in second division, the club has been promoted to the top-tier division, the Liga Super for 2006-07 season. The club has splurged a big budget to buy players while removing majority of squad from the previous winning season, in order to create a more competitive team.

=== Back to second division ===
A slump in performance has caused the club struggling and fighting for relegation in their three seasons of Malaysia Premier League, from 2008 until 2010, before the dark era. The club has been relegated to the Malaysia FAM League for 2011 season.

=== Years of struggle in Malaysia FAM League ===
The club has been relegated from 2010 Malaysia Premier League to the Malaysia FAM League, despite being one of the bigger clubs within it. The club continued to compete and had been a consistent team in third-tier league for five straight seasons.

=== A comeback from lower league ===
The club made a comeback to second-tier league, Malaysia Premier League, in 2016 after being promoted as champions of 2015 Malaysia FAM League. Before winning the FAM League, the club had experienced a 32-year trophy drought, where the last time Melaka United won the Malaysian top-tier league was in 1983. It was the league stage that served as the qualifying round for the Malaysian Cup. During that time, national footballer Soh Chin Ann was playing for Malacca

The club has achieved promotion to Liga Super after becoming the champion of the Malaysia Premier League just one year after winning the Malaysia FAM League.

=== Back to top division league ===
After the promotion to the top division, Melaka United management has made a number of changes, including the new squad selection. On 14 November 2016, Melaka United has announced the appointment of Eric Williams to replace Mat Zan Mat Aris as the new head coach for the club. Eric Williams has previously managed the Myanmar Yangon United F.C. in the 2014 season. The club has also only retained ten players from previous season and has recruited nine new players.

The club has set a high target for 2017 season, including to reach the top five in the league standings. On 18 February 2017, the club has managed to win their first match in Liga Super, almost 10 years after their last win in the top division in 2006–07 season.

== Dissolution ==
Melaka United announced the decision to dissolve the club in 2022, after failing to pay the players and coaches. The debt was thought to be more than RM 3 million. Melaka F.C. become a new team to represent the state of Malacca for 2023 onwards, though they will not inherit the honours and titles won by Melaka United.

== Stadium ==
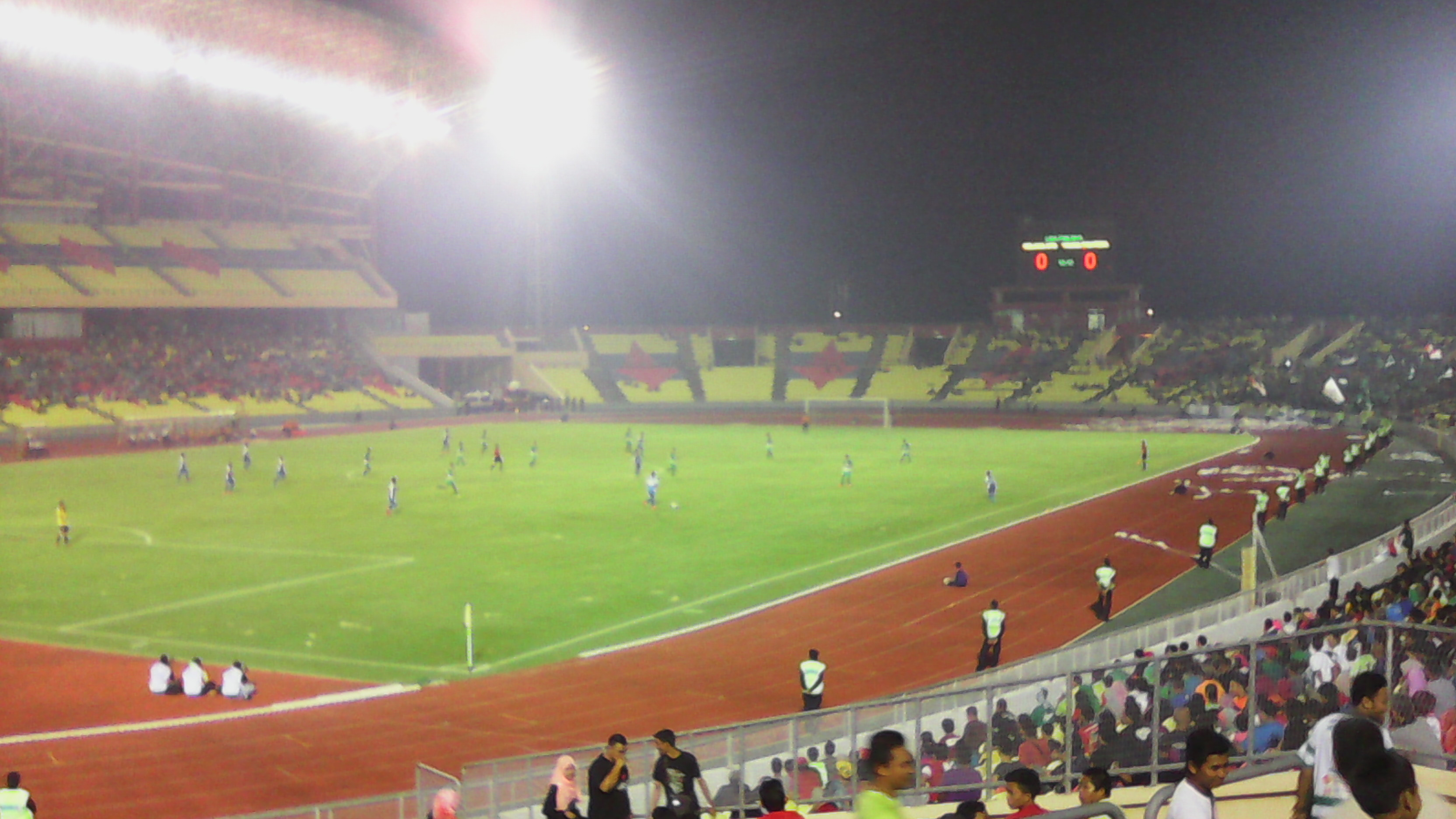
Hang Jebat Stadium

Melaka United last played at Hang Jebat Stadium. The capacity of the stadium is 40,000. In addition to the football field, the stadium also consists of a running track.

The club has previously been using the Hang Tuah Stadium as their home ground.It was still used as a training ground and home stadium for development and youth squad, which mostly competed in Piala Presiden and Piala Belia.

== Crest and colours ==
=== Crest ===
Melaka United has historically utilised one primary crest before the introduction of football league in Malaysia. The first, adopted when the club was founded, was the image of A Famosa, historical remains from the colonial age in Malacca. It was used during the club's amateur era and remained for more than half-century.

Since the introduction of football league, the club has evolved from amateur years and has adopted a new crest which featured an image of Malacca tree, which the city was named after.

Since the end of 2013, the club has had a rebranding to Melaka United, where a new version crest was introduced.

=== Colours ===
Melaka United have always worn green and white shirts as their home kit as it was an iconic colour for the club.

Melaka United's away colours were usually all white with green trim, or various combinations of blue, red, yellow and white, as it represents the colour of Malacca's flag.

=== Colours and kit evolution ===
Home

2016	2017	2018	2019	2020

Away

2016	2017	2018	2019	2020

== Supporters ==
"Ultras Taming Sari" (UTS) was mainly known for supporting Melaka United. The group was one of many ultras supporters created under the branches of Ultras Malaya.

Melaka United was one of the most supported clubs in Malacca. Melaka United's traditional fanbase come from all over the Central Malacca District, Alor Gajah and Jasin area.

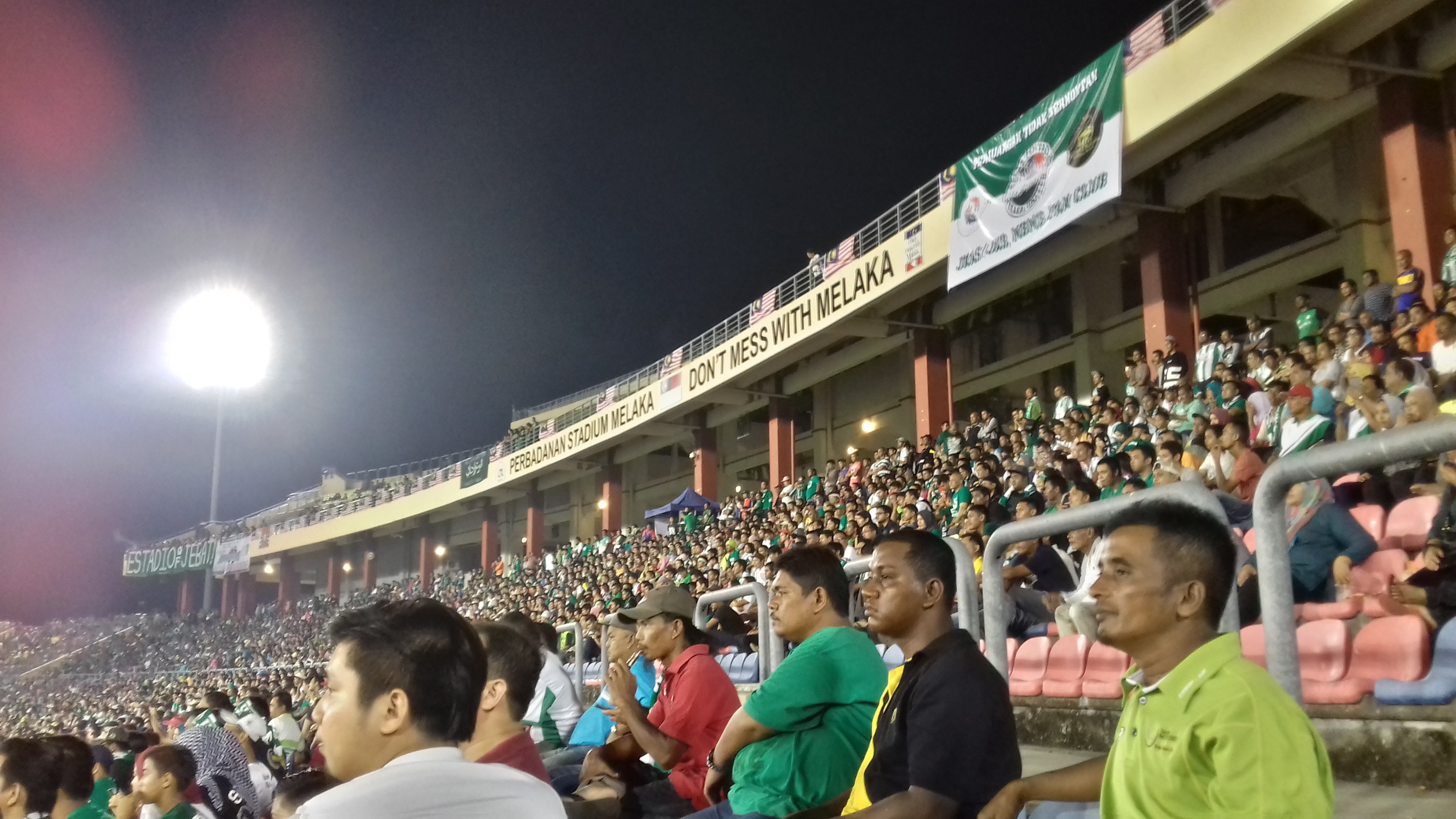
Fans during a match

== Ownership and finances ==
The Malacca football team has been founded since 1921, and the management of the club has been taken over by the foundation of Malacca Amateur Football Association in 1924. The club has been thriving with the financial backing from the state government and sponsors.

In 2014 the management went through a restructuring process to become the Melaka United Soccer Association

=== Sponsorship ===
Season	Kit manufacturer	Shirt sponsor
1979	Admiral	None
1980	Umbro	None
1981	Schwarzenbach	None
1982–84	Schwarzenbach	Schwarzenbach
1985	Schwarzenbach	Gold Flake
1985	Diadora	None
1986	Topper	Topper
1987	RW	None
1988	RW	Dunhill
1989	Asics	Dunhill / EON
1990	Lotto	Dunhill / EON
1991–92	Cheetah	Dunhill / EON
1993	Cheetah & Umbro	Dunhill / EON
1994–97	Mizuno	Dunhill
1998	Mizuno	Dunhill / Gibca Holdings
1999–00	J-King	Dunhill
2001	Mikasa	Dunhill / Mikasa
2002–03	Kronos	Dunhill / Kronos
2004	Admiral	Dunhill / Admiral
2005	Admiral & Garoos	Celcom
2005	Lotto	TM Net / Creative
2006	Figos	TM / Cubic
2006	Joma	TM
2007	Ambros	Celcom / Metaforce
2009	Kika & Shemsy	Streamyx
2010	Shemsy	TM
2011	Kappa	Interpacific
2012	Ambros	Ambros
2013	Arora	None
2014	Kronos	Mamee / KAJ
2015	Kronos	Mamee
2016	Kronos	Edra / Mamee
2017	Kronos	Edra CGN / Tag Marine
2018	Warrix Sports	EDRA CGN
2019	Warrix Sports	EDRA CGN / KLIP
2020	Al-Ikhsan	Olympex
2021	Al-Ikhsan	EDRA CGN/ Mamee
2022	Al-Ikhsan	Ken Team

== Head coaches ==
Coach	Years	Honours
Marco Bilic	1992	
Remeli Junit	1996	
Mahathir Taha	1997	
Mohd Shah Alias Norbit	1998	
G. Torairaju	1999	
Remeli Junit	2000–01	(silver) Runner up 2000 Liga Perdana 2
Ong Kim Swee	2005	
E. Elavarasan	2005–06	(silver) Runner up 2005–06 Liga Premier
K. Devan	2007	
Ramli Junit	2007–08	
Mohd Nick Sham Abdullah	2008–09	
Abdul Rahim Abdullah	2009–10	
Mahathir Taha	2010	
Manja Man	2011	
G. Selvamohan	2012	
Mohd Asri Ninggal	January 2013 – April 2013	
Hashim Abdullah	April 2013	
Ladislav Totkovič	November 2013 – April 2014	
Mat Zan Mat Aris	September 2014 – October 2016	(gold) Winner 2015 Liga FAM (gold) Winner 2016 Liga Premier
Eric Williams	November 2016 – June 2017	
Eduardo Almeida	June 2017 – May 2018	
E. Elavarasan	May 2018 – November 2018	
Zainal Abidin Hassan	14 November 2018 – 17 January 2022	
Risto Vidaković	22 January 2022 – 12 April 2022	

=== Records ===
Name	Period	GP	W	D	L	GS	GA	GD	Win %
Mat Zan Mat Aris	Sept 2014 – Oct 2016	46	30	9	7	92	51	+41	65.22
Eric Williams	November 2016 – June 2017	14	3	5	6	12	26	−14	21.43
Eduardo Almeida	June 2017 – May 2018	17	7	2	8	15	59	−44	41.18
E. Elavarasan	May 2018 – November 2018	19	8	7	4	42	26	+16	42.11
Zainal Abidin Hassan	14 November 2018 – 2022	21	9	5	7	34	28	+6	42.86

== Team managers ==
Year	Manager
1999–2002	Datuk Ibrahim Durum
2005	Datuk Chua Peng Song
2006–2008	Karim Yaacob
2008–2009	Mohd Yazid Khamis
2009–2010	Abdul Malik Kassim
2011–2013	Datuk Mohd Yunos Husin
April 2013–November 2013	Datuk Wira Idris Haron
November 2013 – 2022	Datuk Mohd Yusoff Bin Hj Mahadi

== Honours ==
=== Domestic competitions ===
- Liga Malaysia/Liga Semi-Pro Divisyen 1/Liga Perdana/Liga Perdana 1/Liga Super (level 1)
  - Champions (1): 1983
- Liga Semi-Pro Divisyen 2/Liga Perdana 2/Liga Premier (level 2)
  - Champions (1): 2016
  - Runners-up (2): 2000, 2005–06
- Piala FAM/Liga FAM (level 3)
  - Champions (1): 2015
  - Runners-up (2): 1957, 1958

=== Preseason competitions ===
- Malacca TYT Cup

(gold) Winners (1): 2022

== Performance in AFC competitions ==
- Asian Club Championship / AFC Champions League: 1 appearance

1986: Southeast Asia Qualifying/ASEAN Champions Cup–4th place

Season	Competition	Round	Club	1st Leg	2nd Leg	Aggregate
1985–86	Asian Club Championship	Qualifying Round / Southeast Asia (ASEAN Champions Cup)	(Indonesia) Krama Yudha Tiga Berlian	2–0 (Loss)		4th place
1985–86	Asian Club Championship	Qualifying Round / Southeast Asia (ASEAN Champions Cup)	(Brunei) ADP FC	1–0 (Win)		4th place
1985–86	Asian Club Championship	Qualifying Round / Southeast Asia (ASEAN Champions Cup)	(Thailand) Bangkok Bank F.C.	5–1 (Loss)		4th place
1985–86	Asian Club Championship	Qualifying Round / Southeast Asia (ASEAN Champions Cup)	(Singapore) Tiong Bahru CSC	0–0 (Draw)		4th place

== Club record ==
- Pld = Played, W = Won, D = Drawn, L = Lost, F = Goals for, A = Goals against, D = Goal difference, Pts= Points, Pos = Position

1st or Champions Runner-up 3rd place Promotion Relegation

Season	League										Cup			Asia	
Season	Division	Pld	W	D	L	F	A	D	Pts	Pos	Sumbangsih	Malaysia	FA	Competition	Result
2001	Liga Perdana 1	22	6	4	12	25	38	–13	22	11th	—	—	2nd round	—	—
2002	Liga Perdana 1	26	8	3	15	28	48	–20	27	11th	—	Group stage	1st round	—	—
2003	Liga Perdana 1	24	5	5	14	24	53	–29	20	11th	—	Group stage	1st round	—	—
2004	Liga Premier	24	6	9	9	32	38	–6	27	7th	—	—	3rd round	—	—
2005	Liga Premier	21	3	1	17	17	50	–33	10	8th	—	—	1st round	—	—
2005–06	Liga Premier	21	13	4	4	48	24	+24	43	1st	—	Group stage	1st round	—	—
2006–07	Liga Super	24	2	3	19	24	72	–48	9	13th	—	Quarter-finals	—	—	—
2007–08	Liga Premier	24	8	2	14	29	43	–14	26	9th	—	Group stage	Quarter-finals	—	—
2009	Liga Premier	24	3	9	12	17	32	–15	18	11th	—	Group stage	1st round	—	—
2010	Liga Premier	22	4	3	15	31	68	–37	15	11th	—	Not qualified	1st round	—	—
2011	Liga FAM	20	7	5	8	45	40	+5	26	6th	—	Not qualified	1st round	—	—
2012	Liga FAM	16	5	1	10	20	25	–5	16	7th	—	Not qualified	1st round	—	—
2013	Liga FAM	20	10	3	7	30	30	0	33	6th	—	Not qualified	1st round	—	—
2014	Liga FAM	22	8	4	10	34	37	–3	28	6th	—	Not qualified	1st round	—	—
2015	Liga FAM	16	11	3	2	30	13	+17	36	1st	—	Not qualified	1st round	—	—
2016	Liga Premier	22	15	5	2	48	25	+23	50	1st	—	Group stage	2nd round	—	—
2017	Liga Super	22	6	6	10	33	46	–13	24	8th	—	Quarter-finals	3rd round	—	—
2018	Liga Super	22	9	4	9	33	38	–5	31	7th	—	Group Stage	3rd round	—	—
2019	Liga Super	22	9	6	7	34	30	+4	33	6th	—	Quarter-finals	2nd round	—	—
2020	Liga Super	11	4	2	5	13	16	–3	11	9th	—	Round of 16	2nd round	—	—

== Individual player awards ==
=== Malaysian League Golden boot winners ===
Season	Player	Goals
2016	(Indonesia) Ilija Spasojević	24

=== Malaysian League top goalscorers ===
Season	Player	Goals
1995	(Malaysia) Norizam Ali Hassan	11
2003	(Malaysia) Sufian Shamsubari	8
2004	(Slovenia) Emir Dzafic	10
2009	(Malaysia) Fauzzi Kassim	7
2015	(Malaysia) Nurshamil Abd Ghani	15
2016	(Indonesia) Ilija Spasojević	24
2017	(Croatia) Marko Šimić	12
2018	(Belarus) Yahor Zubovich	12
2019	(Philippines) Patrick Reichelt	11
2020	(Nigeria) Uche Agba	6

== Notable former players ==
This list of prominent former players includes those who received international caps while playing for the team, made significant contribution in terms of appearances or goals, or to the sport either before they played for the team, or after they left. It is not complete or all inclusive, additions and refinements will continue to be made over time.

- (Malaysia) Robert Choe
- (Malaysia) Soh Chin Ann
- (Malaysia) Dollah Salleh
- (Malaysia) Lim Teong Kim
- (Malaysia) V. Murugan
- (Malaysia) Lim Teong Kim
- (Malaysia) Ong Kim Swee
- (Malaysia) Shamsurin Abdul Rahman
- (Malaysia) Shukor Adan
- (Malaysia) Amri Yahyah
- (Malaysia) Safiq Rahim
- (Malaysia) Azizan Baba
- (Malaysia) Nurshamil Abd Ghani
- (Indonesia) Ilija Spasojević
- (Croatia) Marko Šimić

== Affiliated clubs ==
- Melaka
- SAMB
