= 2017 Negeri Sembilan FA season =

Negeri Sembilan
2017 season
- President: Dato' Seri Utama Haji Mohamad bin Hasan
- Head Coach: Mohd Asri Ninggal
- Stadium: Tuanku Abdul Rahman Stadium
- Malaysia Premier League: 5th (promoted) ▲
- Malaysia FA Cup: Semi-final
- Malaysia Cup: Group stage
Home colours	Away colours	Third colours

The 2017 season was Negeri Sembilan's 94th year in their history and 6th season in Malaysia Premier League since it was first introduced in 2004. Also it was the fourth season in the Malaysia Premier League following relegation on 2013 season. Along with the league, the club also participated in the Malaysia FA Cup and the Malaysia Cup.

== Events ==
In December 2016, the club signed several new players. Among them were Lee Tuck, Bruno Suzuki and Nemanja Vidić .

The Negeri Sembilan squad extended their winning record at home when they managed to beat newcomers, PKNP FC, 3–1, in the Premier League competition, at Tuanku Abdul Rahman Stadium on 3 February 2017.

On 4 March 2017, Negeri Sembilan continued to be on top of the Premier League when it defeated Kuala Lumpur 2–1 at Tuanku Abdul Rahman Stadium, Paroi.

On 13 May 2017, Negeri Sembilan met Pahang in the second leg of the Malaysia FA Cup. Previously, they were defeated by a score of 1–0 at Darul Makmur Stadium. Negeri Sembilan started off hard when Pahang managed to get a goal as early as the 6th minute. Negeri Sembilan managed to equalize in the 68th minute but were surprised by a late goal in the match on (90+2'). Negeri Sembilan lost 3–1 on aggregate.

On 21 April 2017, Negeri Sembilan managed to defeat Sabah with an aggregate of 1–0 in the FA Cup competition.

On 13 May 2017, the FA Cup semi-final second leg against Pahang ended with a 2–1 victory over Pahang with an aggregate of 3–1. Negeri Sembilan was previously defeated with a result of 1–0 in the first match at Darul Makmur Stadium.

== Players ==
No.	Name	Age	Nationality	Notes
Goalkeepers
1	Ezad Ariff Jamaludin	20	(Malaysia)	
12	Kaharuddin Rahman	24	(Malaysia)	
25	Saiful Amar Sudar	34	(Malaysia)	
30	Mohd Yatim Abdullah	23	(Malaysia)	
Defenders
4	Fauzan Fauzi	21	(Malaysia)	
5	Annas Rahmat	21	(Malaysia)	
6	Mohd Nasriq Baharom	29	(Malaysia)	
13	Noor Hazrul Mustafa	27	(Malaysia)	
15	Ashmawi Yakin	22	(Malaysia)	
18	Shazlan Alias	26	(Malaysia)	
18	Aroon Kumar	22	(Malaysia)	
19	Khairul Anwar Shahrudin	25	(Malaysia)	
20	Hariri Safii	27	(Malaysia)	
26	Nemanja Vidić	26	(Serbia)	
28	Arman Fareez Ali	26	(Malaysia)	
29	Curran Ferns	22	(Malaysia)	
Midfielders
2	Lee Tuck	26	(England)	
8	Shahrul Igwan	22	(Malaysia)	
9	Mohd Faizal Abu Bakar	25	(Malaysia)	
16	Norhafizzuan Jailani	26	(Malaysia)	
22	Farderin Kadir	29	(Malaysia)	
9	Syahid Zaidon	27	(Malaysia)	
27	Izzudin Zainudin	22	(Malaysia)	
Forwards
7	Bruno Suzuki	26	(Japan)	
10	Marko Šimić	28	(Croatia)	
11	Rahizi Mohd Rasib	21	(Malaysia)	
14	Ahmad Hazeri Hamid	22	(Malaysia)	
17	Izuan Salahuddin	24	(Malaysia)	
23	Muhd Nizam Ruslan	22	(Malaysia)	
34	Sean Selvaraj	20	(Malaysia)	

== Competitions ==
=== Malaysia Premier League ===
==== League table ====
Pos	Team	Pld	W	D	L	GF	GA	GD	Pts	Promotion, qualification or relegation
1	Kuala Lumpur	22	15	2	5	47	24	+23	47	Promotion to Super League
2	Terengganu	22	15	2	5	42	27	+15	47	Promotion to Super League
3	PKNP	22	14	4	4	41	23	+18	46	Promotion to Super League
4	Johor Darul Ta'zim II	22	11	8	3	47	27	+20	41	
5	Negeri Sembilan	22	11	8	3	37	24	+13	41	Promotion to Super League
6	UiTM	22	9	6	7	44	30	+14	33	
7	Sabah	22	9	3	10	33	38	−5	30	
8	PDRM	22	7	4	11	36	41	−5	25	
9	Kuantan	22	5	1	16	41	64	−23	16	
10	MISC-MIFA	22	4	2	16	36	51	−15	14	
11	ATM	22	4	5	13	28	50	−22	14 (Note: ATM and Perlis was sentenced to a six-point deduction immediately on offense failed to complete the registration process Malaysian League (M-League) 2017. Later, upon careful consideration of the aforementioned appeals, Football Malaysia have decided to only reduce the deduction of 6 points to 3 points for ATM.)	Relegation to FAM League
12	Perlis	22	4	3	15	22	55	−33	12 (Note: ATM and Perlis was sentenced to a six-point deduction immediately on offense failed to complete the registration process Malaysian League (M-League) 2017. Later, upon careful consideration of the aforementioned appeals, Football Malaysia have decided to lift the transfer ban and reduce the deduction of 6 points to 3 points for Perlis.)	Relegation to FAM League

Source: FAM, FMLLP
Rules for classification: 1) Points; 2) Goal difference; 3) Number of goals scored.

=== Malaysia FA Cup ===
==== Teams ====
- 6 teams from FAM League entered in the First Round. DYS and Sungai Ara withdraw from the competition.
- 27 teams (12 teams from Super League, 12 teams from Premier League and three teams from FAM League) entered in the Second Round.

==== Second Round ====
14 February 2017	Selangor (1)	0–0 (a.e.t.) (3–4 p)	Negeri Sembilan (2)	Selayang, Selangor
21:00 UTC+8		Report		Stadium: Selayang Stadium; Attendance: 4704; Referee: S.Sittharanjanan (Sabah)
	Penalties
	Juliano (penalty scored); Razman (penalty scored); Doe (penalty scored); Halim (penalty missed); Ugo (penalty missed)		(penalty missed) Hazrul; (penalty scored) Lee Tuck; (penalty scored) Vidić; (penalty scored) Faizal; (penalty scored) Suzuki

==== Quarter-final ====
Team 1	Agg.	Team 2	1st leg	2nd leg
Pahang (1)	4–3	Johor Darul Ta'zim (1)	3–1	1–2
Sabah (2)	0–1	Negeri Sembilan (2)	0–1	0–0
Kedah (1)	6–2	(Perak) PKNP (2)	6–1	0–1
Terengganu (2)	2–2 (4–1 p)	Sarawak (1)	1–1	1–1

===== First leg =====
1 April 2017	Sabah (2)	0–1	Negeri Sembilan (2)	Kota Kinabalu, Sabah
20:15 UTC+8		Report	26' Simic	Stadium: Likas Stadium; Attendance: 4,100; Referee: Muhammad Zamzaidi Katimin

===== Second leg =====
21 April 2017	Negeri Sembilan (2)	0–0 (1–0 agg.)	Sabah (2)	Paroi, Negeri Sembilan
21:00 UTC+8		Report		Stadium: Tuanku Abdul Rahman Stadium; Attendance: 20,736; Referee: Mohd Amirul Izwan Bin Yaacob

==== Semi-final ====
Team 1	Agg.	Team 2	1st leg	2nd leg
Pahang (1)	3–1	Negeri Sembilan (2)	1–0	2–1
Kedah (1)	4–0	Terengganu (2)	1–0	3–0

===== First leg =====
30 April 2017	Pahang (1)	1–0	Negeri Sembilan (2)	Kuantan, Pahang
21:00 UTC+8	Annas 80' (og.)	Report		Stadium: Darul Makmur Stadium; Attendance: 30,149; Referee: Razlan Jofri Ali

===== Second leg =====
13 May 2017	Negeri Sembilan (2)	1–2 (1–3 agg.)	Pahang (1)	Paroi, Negeri Sembilan
21:00 UTC+8	68' Bruno	Report	6' Jae-won; 90+2' Jayaseelan	Stadium: Tuanku Abdul Rahman Stadium; Attendance: 38,380

=== Malaysia Cup ===
==== Format ====
In the competition, the top eleven teams from the First Round of 2017 Malaysia Super League were joined by the top five teams from the First Round of 2017 Malaysia Premier League. The teams were drawn into four groups of four teams.

==== Seeding ====
Pot 1	Pot 2	Pot 3	Pot 4
Johor Darul Ta'zim; Pahang; Kedah; Perak	Selangor (Pahang) Felda United; Kelantan (Terengganu) T-Team	(Selangor) PKNS (Malacca) Melaka United; Sarawak; Negeri Sembilan	Terengganu (Perak) PKNP; Kuala Lumpur (Selangor) UiTM

==== Group stage ====
===== Group A =====
Pos	Team	Pld	W	D	L	GF	GA	GD	Pts	Qualification	PKNP	PHG	NSL	TTM
1	(Perak) PKNP	6	3	2	1	9	9	0	11	Advance to knockout phase	—	1–1	2–0	4–1
2	Pahang	6	2	3	1	14	8	+6	9	Advance to knockout phase	6–0	—	2–2	3–2
3	Negeri Sembilan	6	1	3	2	8	12	−4	6		0–0	2–1	—	3–3
4	(Terengganu) T–Team	6	1	2	3	12	14	−2	5		1–2	1–1	4–1	—

Updated to match(es) played on 9 September 2017. Source: FAM FMLLP

== Statistics ==
No.	Name	Age	Natl	Total		League		FA Cup		Malaysia Cup	
No.	Name	Age	Natl	Apps	Goals	Apps	Goals	Apps	Goals	Apps	Goals
1	Ezad Ariff Jamaludin	20	(Malaysia)								
12	Kaharuddin Rahman	24	(Malaysia)								
25	Saiful Amar Sudar	34	(Malaysia)								
30	Mohd Yatim Abdullah	23	(Malaysia)								
4	Fauzan Fauzi	21	(Malaysia)								
5	Annas Rahmat	21	(Malaysia)								
6	Mohd Nasriq Baharom	29	(Malaysia)								
13	Noor Hazrul Mustafa	27	(Malaysia)								
15	Ashmawi Yakin	22	(Malaysia)								
18	Shazlan Alias	26	(Malaysia)								
18	Aroon Kumar	22	(Malaysia)								
19	Khairul Anwar Shahrudin	25	(Malaysia)								
20	Hariri Safii	27	(Malaysia)								
26	Nemanja Vidić	26	(Serbia)								
28	Arman Fareez Ali	26	(Malaysia)								
29	Curran Ferns	22	(Malaysia)								
2	Lee Tuck	26	(England)								
8	Shahrul Igwan	22	(Malaysia)								
9	Mohd Faizal Abu Bakar	25	(Malaysia)								
16	Norhafizzuan Jailani	26	(Malaysia)								
22	Farderin Kadir	29	(Malaysia)								
9	Syahid Zaidon	27	(Malaysia)								
27	Izzudin Zainudin	22	(Malaysia)								
7	Bruno Suzuki	26	(Japan)								
10	Marko Šimić	28	(Croatia)								
11	Rahizi Mohd Rasib	21	(Malaysia)								
14	Ahmad Hazeri Hamid	22	(Malaysia)								
17	Izuan Salahuddin	24	(Malaysia)								
23	Muhd Nizam Ruslan	22	(Malaysia)								
34	Sean Selvaraj	20	(Malaysia)								
