= 2018 Negeri Sembilan FA season =

Negeri Sembilan
2018 season
- President: Mohamad Hassan; Tunku Syed Razman Tunku Syed Idrus Al-Qadri (began 10 September)
- Manager: Satwant Singh Balwant Singh
- Head Coach: Jörg Steinebrunner; Azraai Khor (began 28 February); Mario Lemos (began 11 May)
- Stadium: Tuanku Abdul Rahman Stadium
- Malaysia Super League: 12th (relegated) ▼
- FA Cup: Second round
- Challenge Cup: Group stage
- Top goalscorer: League: Nicolás Vélez; Flávio Júnior (8 goals); All: Flávio Júnior (10 goals)
Home colours	Away colours	Third colours

The 2018 season was Negeri Sembilan's 95th season in club history and 9th season in Malaysia Super League since it was first introduced in 2004. Also it was the first season in the Malaysia Super League since promoted of the Malaysia Premier League in 2017 season.

== Club ==
=== Coaching staff ===
Position	Name
Head coach	(Portugal) Mario Lemos
Assistant head coach	(Malaysia) Mohd Asri Ninggal
Assistant coach	(Malaysia) Mohd Shafiq Jonny Abdullah
Goalkeeping coach	(Malaysia) Ismadi Ismail
Fitness coach	(Malaysia) Ahmad Osman
Fitness Coach	(Malaysia) Joseph Ronald D'Angelus
Doctor	(Malaysia) Dr. Kanaganthren Loganathan
Physiotherapist	(Malaysia) Ahmad Faisal Miswan
Massuer	(Malaysia) Mohd Zaidi Abdul Latib
Security Officer	(Malaysia) Anuar Abd Rahman
Media Officer	(Malaysia) Syed Muhammad Khairi Syed Khaidzir
Kitman	(Malaysia) Shahrizal Mat Sah

=== Kit manufacturers and financial sponsor ===
Nation	Corporation
Main sponsors
(Malaysia)	Matrix Concept Group
Shirt sponsors
(Malaysia)	

== Player information ==
=== Full squad ===
No.	Name	Nat	Position	Since	Signed from	Date of birth (age)	Notes
Goalkeepers
1	Saiful Amar Sudar	(Malaysia)	GK	2017	(Malaysia) Perlis	10 June 1982 (aged 36)	
12	Kaharuddin Rahman	(Malaysia)	GK	2012	(Negeri Sembilan) Youth system	7 August 1991 (aged 27)	
27	Ilham Amirullah Razali	(Malaysia)	GK	2018	(Malaysia) Felda United	26 February 1994 (aged 24)	
Defenders
3	Alex Moraes	(Brazil)	CB	2018	(Malaysia) Pahang FA	25 March 1988 (aged 30)	Import
4	Fauzan Fauzi	(Malaysia)	RB / DM	2017	(Negeri Sembilan) Youth system	7 January 1995 (aged 23)	
5	Rizal Fahmi Rosid	(Malaysia)	CB	2018	(Malaysia) Selangor	1 May 1986 (aged 32)	
6	Nasriq Baharom	(Malaysia)	CB	2016	(Malaysia) Felda United	8 February 1987 (aged 31)	
11	Aizulridzwan Razali	(Malaysia)	LB	2018	(Malaysia) Felda United	19 November 1986 (aged 32)	
13	Hazrul Mustafa (vice-captain)	(Malaysia)	RB / LB / LW	2017	(Malaysia) Kelantan	11 October 1988 (aged 30)	
16	Kalaiharasan Letchumanan	(Malaysia)	CB / RB / LB	2018	(Negeri Sembilan) Youth system	17 March 1996 (aged 22)	
55	Osman Yusoff	(Malaysia)	CB	2018	(Malaysia) Kedah	17 March 1994 (aged 24)	
Midfielders
2	Aroon Kumar Ramaloo	(Malaysia)	DM / CM / RB	2016	(Negeri Sembilan) Youth system	18 March 1994 (aged 24)	
7	Flávio Beck Júnior	(Brazil)	AM	2018	(Indonesia) Pusamania Borneo	14 March 1987 (aged 31)	Import
8	Asraf Roslan	(Malaysia)	RW / LW	2018	(Negeri Sembilan) Youth system	3 April 1996 (aged 22)	
9	Syahid Zaidon	(Malaysia)	DM / CM	2018	(Malaysia) Felda United	12 August 1990 (aged 28)	
15	Fauzan Dzulkifli (vice-captain)	(Malaysia)	DM / CM	2018	(Malaysia) PKNS	13 October 1987 (aged 31)	
17	Izuan Salahuddin	(Malaysia)	RW / LW	2017	(Malaysia) DRB-Hicom	31 October 1991 (aged 27)	
19	Khairul Anwar Shahrudin	(Malaysia)	LW / LB	2016	(Malaysia) Sime Darby	9 October 1990 (aged 28)	
20	Faizal Abu Bakar	(Malaysia)	DM / CM	2017	(Malaysia) Kelantan	20 September 1990 (aged 28)	
23	Nizam Ruslan	(Malaysia)	RW / LW	2016	(Negeri Sembilan) Youth system	6 April 1994 (aged 24)	
24	Aiman Khalidi	(Malaysia)	RW / LW	2018	(Negeri Sembilan) Youth system	8 February 1996 (aged 22)	
25	Thanabalan Nadarajah	(Malaysia)	RW / LW	2014	(Negeri Sembilan) Youth system	25 February 1995 (aged 23)	
26	David Rowley	(Malaysia)	DM / CM	2018	(Malaysia) PDRM	16 February 1990 (aged 28)	
29	Kim Do-heon (captain)	(South Korea)	CM / AM	2018	(South Korea) Seongnam	14 July 1982 (aged 36)	Import
Forwards
10	Nicolás Vélez	(Argentina)	ST / AM	2018	(Thailand) Suphanburi	4 July 1990 (aged 28)	Import
14	Ferris Danial	(Malaysia)	ST	2018	(Malaysia) Terengganu	21 August 1992 (aged 26)	
18	Khairul Izuan Rosli	(Malaysia)	ST / RW / LW	2018	(Malaysia) Kelantan	9 March 1991 (aged 27)	
21	Fauzi Abdul Latif	(Malaysia)	ST	2018	(Negeri Sembilan) Youth system	10 July 1996 (aged 22)	
30	Fakhrul Aiman Sidid	(Malaysia)	RW / LW / AM / ST	2018	(Malaysia) Felda United	12 August 1989 (aged 29)	
58	Ángel Guirado	(Philippines)	ST / RW / LW	2018	(Philippines) Davao Aguilas	9 December 1984 (aged 34)	Import

== Transfers ==
=== 1st leg ===
In

Pos.	Name	From	Notes
GK	(Malaysia) Syihan Hazmi Mohamed	(Malaysia) Kelantan	
GK	(Malaysia) Ilham Amirullah Razali	(Malaysia) Felda United	
GK	(Malaysia) Ezad Ariff Jamaludin	(Malaysia) MISC-MIFA	Loan Return
DF	(Malaysia) Rizal Fahmi Rosid	(Malaysia) Selangor	
DF	(Malaysia) Aizulridzwan Razali	(Malaysia) Felda United	
DF	(Malaysia) Kalaiharasan Letchumanan	(Negeri Sembilan) Youth system	Promoted
DF	(Latvia) Renārs Rode	(Latvia) FK RFS	Import
MF	(Brazil) Flávio Beck Júnior	(Indonesia) Pusamania Borneo	Import
MF	(Malaysia) Asraf Roslan	(Negeri Sembilan) Youth system	Promoted
MF	(Malaysia) Syahid Zaidon	(Malaysia) Felda United	
MF	(Malaysia) Fauzan Dzulkifli	(Malaysia) PKNS	
MF	(Malaysia) Aiman Khalidi	(Negeri Sembilan) Youth system	Promoted
MF	(Malaysia) Thanabalan Nadarajah	(Malaysia) Felcra	Loan Return
MF	(South Korea) Kim Do-heon	(South Korea) Seongnam	Import
FW	(Argentina) Nicolás Vélez	(Thailand) Suphanburi	Import
FW	(Malaysia) Ferris Danial	(Malaysia) Terengganu	
FW	(Malaysia) Khairul Izuan Rosli	(Malaysia) Kelantan	
FW	(Malaysia) Fauzi Abdul Latif	(Negeri Sembilan) Youth system	Promoted
FW	(Cambodia) Prak Mony Udom	(Cambodia) PKR Svay Rieng	Import
FW	(Malaysia) Fakhrul Aiman Sidid	(Malaysia) Felda United	
FW	(Malaysia) Rahizi Rasib	(Malaysia) Felcra	Loan Return

Out

Pos.	Name	To	Notes
GK	(Malaysia) Ezad Ariff Jamaludin	(Malaysia) MOF	
GK	(Malaysia) Yatim Abdullah	(Malaysia) Felcra	
DF	(Malaysia) Ashmawi Yakin	(Malaysia) Selangor	
DF	(Malaysia) Annas Rahmat	(Malaysia) PKNS	
DF	(Malaysia) Hariri Safii	(Malaysia) Terengganu City	
DF	(Malaysia) Radzuan Abdullah	Released	
DF	(Malaysia) Shazlan Alias	(Malaysia) Melaka United	
DF	(Malaysia) Arman Fareez Ali	(Malaysia) Penang	
DF	(Malaysia) Nik Shahrul Azim	(Malaysia) Kelantan	Loan End
DF	(Malaysia) Sabre Abu	(Malaysia) PKNS	Loan End
MF	(Malaysia) Shahrul Igwan	(Malaysia) Selangor	
MF	(Malaysia) Hazeri Hamid	Released	
MF	(Malaysia) Norhafizzuan Jailani	(Malaysia) Terengganu City	
MF	(Serbia) Nemanja Vidić	Released	Import
MF	(Malaysia) Izzudin Zainudin	Released	
FW	(England) Lee Tuck	(Malaysia) Terengganu	Import
FW	(Japan) Bruno Castanheira	(Malaysia) Terengganu II	Import
FW	(Malaysia) Rahizi Rasib	(Malaysia) Terengganu City	
FW	(Malaysia) Farderin Kadir	(Malaysia) PKNS	Loan End
FW	(Malaysia) Sean Selvaraj	(Malaysia) Selangor	
FW	(France) Jonathan Béhé	(Singapore) Warriors	Import

=== 2nd leg ===
In

Pos.	Name	From	Notes
DF	(Brazil) Alex Moraes	(Malaysia) Pahang	Import
DF	(Malaysia) Osman Yusoff	(Malaysia) Kedah	
MF	(Malaysia) David Rowley	(Malaysia) PDRM	
FW	(Philippines) Ángel Guirado	(Philippines) Davao Aguilas	Import

Out

Pos.	Name	To	Notes
GK	(Malaysia) Syihan Hazmi Mohamed	Released	
DF	(Latvia) Renārs Rode	(Republic of Ireland) Waterford F.C.	Import
FW	(Cambodia) Prak Mony Udom	(Cambodia) PKR Svay Rieng	Import

== Non-competitive ==
=== Pre-season ===
24 November 2017 Friendly	Warriors (Singapore)	0–4	(Malaysia) Negeri Sembilan	Choa Chu Kang
20:45 SGT			Goal	Stadium: Choa Chu Kang Stadium

10 December 2017 Friendly	Melaka United (Malaysia)	1–2	(Malaysia) Negeri Sembilan	Krubong
20:45 MYT	Nurshamil		Ivan Fatić; Andrezinho	Stadium: Hang Jebat Stadium

15 December 2017 Friendly	PKNS (Malaysia)	1–1	(Malaysia) Negeri Sembilan	Kelana Jaya
20:45 MYT	Goal		(pen.) Fauzi	Stadium: PKNS Sport Complex

21 December 2017 Friendly	Negeri Sembilan (Malaysia)	0–3	(Malaysia) PDRM	Paroi
20:45 MYT			Goal	Stadium: Tuanku Abdul Rahman Stadium

29 December 2017 Friendly	Negeri Sembilan (Malaysia)	1–1	(Malaysia) PDRM	Bangi
20:45 MYT	Khairul Anwar		(pen.)	Stadium: BSN Sport Complex

20 January 2018 Friendly	Negeri Sembilan (Malaysia)	2–1	(Malaysia) Marcerra Kuantan	Bangi
16:45 MYT	Khairul Izuan; Izuan		Goal	Stadium: BSN Sport Complex

25 January 2018 Friendly	Negeri Sembilan (Malaysia)	3–1	Malaysia U19	Bangi
20:45 MYT	Vélez; Flávio (pen.); Aroon Kumar		Goal	Stadium: BSN Sport Complex

27 January 2018 Friendly	Negeri Sembilan (Malaysia)	2–0	(Singapore) Warriors	Bangi
20:45 MYT	Fakhrul Aiman; Nasriq			Stadium: Maybank Stadium

=== Cambodia Pre-season Tour 2018 ===
5 January 2018 Friendly	Army (Cambodia)	1–1	(Malaysia) Negeri Sembilan	Phnom Penh
18:30 ICT	(pen.)		Syahid	Stadium: Phnom Penh Olympic Stadium

6 January 2018 Friendly	Phnom Penh Crown (Cambodia)	0–3	(Malaysia) Negeri Sembilan	Phnom Penh
19:00 ICT			11' Flávio; 74' Vélez; 90+' Khairul Izuan	Stadium: RSN Stadium

10 January 2018 Friendly	PKR Svay Rieng (Cambodia)	2–1	(Malaysia) Negeri Sembilan	Svay Rieng
16:30 ICT	Goal		Fakhrul Aiman	Stadium: Svay Rieng Stadium

== Competitions ==
=== Malaysia Super League ===
==== League table ====
Pos	Team	Pld	W	D	L	GF	GA	GD	Pts	Qualification or relegation
8	Selangor	22	7	6	9	35	39	−4	27	
9	PKNP	22	7	4	11	25	31	−6	25	
10	Kuala Lumpur	22	7	3	12	39	51	−12	24	
11	Kelantan (R)	22	5	3	14	20	43	−23	18	Relegation to the Premier League
12	Negeri Sembilan (R)	22	4	3	15	27	47	−20	15	Relegation to the Premier League

Source: FAM, FMLLP
Rules for classification: 1) Points; 2) Goal difference; 3) Number of goals scored.
(R) Relegated

==== Results by matchday ====
Matchday	1	2	3	4	5	6	7	8	9	10	11	12	13	14	15	16	17	18	19	20	21	22
Ground	A	H	A	H	A	H	A	A	H	H	A	A	H	H	A	H	A	A	H	H	A	H
Result	L	W	L	L	L	D	L	D	L	L	L	W	W	D	L	L	L	L	L	W	L	L
Position	11	5	9	11	12	12	12	12	12	12	12	12	11	11	11	11	11	12	12	11	11	12

Updated to match(es) played on 29 July 2018. Source: PBNS
A = Away; H = Home; W = Win; D = Draw; L = Loss

==== Matches ====
3 February 2018 1	PKNP	1–0	Negeri Sembilan	Batu Kawan
16:45 MYT	Sokpheng 48'	Report		Stadium: Batu Kawan Stadium; Referee: Ku Alauddin Ku Muhammad

7 February 2018 2	Negeri Sembilan	2–0	Kuala Lumpur	Paroi
21:00 MYT	Vélez 12', 32'			Stadium: Tuanku Abdul Rahman Stadium; Attendance: 7,314; Referee: Suhaimi Mat Hassan

10 February 2018 3	Melaka United	3–0	Negeri Sembilan	Krubong
21:00 MYT	Zubovich 32', 40'; Gopinathan 71'	Report		Stadium: Hang Jebat Stadium; Referee: Mohd Amirul Izwan Yaacob

23 February 2018 4	Negeri Sembilan	1–2	Terengganu	Paroi
21:00 MYT	Fakrul 74'	Report	14' Ashari; 85' Lee Jun-hyeob	Stadium: Tuanku Abdul Rahman Stadium; Referee: Nagor Amir Noor Mohamed

10 March 2018 5	Pahang	4–0	Negeri Sembilan	Kuantan
21:00 MYT	Cruz 27', 66'; Doe 45+1', 89'			Stadium: Darul Makmur Stadium; Referee: Fitri Maskon

14 April 2018 6	Negeri Sembilan	1–1	Kelantan	Paroi
21:00 MYT	Flávio 8'	Report	90+5' Nik Akif	Stadium: Tuanku Abdul Rahman Stadium; Referee: Suhaizi Shukri

28 April 2018 7	Selangor	2–1	Negeri Sembilan	Cheras
21:00 MYT	Rufino 35'; Selvaraj 56'	Report	64' Thanabalan	Stadium: KLFA Stadium; Referee: Nagor Amir Noor Mohamed

1 May 2018 8	Kedah	3–3	Negeri Sembilan	Alor Setar
21:00 MYT	Krasniqi 2'; Syazwan 27'; Sandro 31' (pen.)	Report	4' Thanabalan; 48' Vélez; 87' (pen.) Flávio	Stadium: Darul Aman Stadium; Referee: Mohd Amirul Izwan Yaacob

5 May 2018 9	Negeri Sembilan	0–4	Johor Darul Ta'zim	Paroi
21:00 MYT		Report	6' (pen.) Cabrera; 38' Corbin-Ong; 63' (pen.), 74' Safawi	Stadium: Tuanku Abdul Rahman Stadium; Referee: Nazmi Nasaruddin

13 May 2018 10	Negeri Sembilan	1–2	Kedah	Paroi
21:00 MYT	Flávio 76'	Report	8' Krasniqi; 16' Akhyar	Stadium: Tuanku Abdul Rahman Stadium; Referee: Suhaimi Mat Hassan

23 May 2018 11	Johor Darul Ta'zim	2–0	Negeri Sembilan	Larkin
22:00 MYT	Cabrera 33', 76'	Report		Stadium: Tan Sri Dato' Haji Hassan Yunos Stadium; Referee: Wan Mohamad Tarmizi

26 May 2018 12	Kelantan	0–2	Negeri Sembilan	Paroi
22:00 MYT		Report	17' Moraes; 38' (pen.) Guirado	Stadium: Tuanku Abdul Rahman Stadium; Referee: Muhd Rahmat Jantan

3 June 2018 13	Negeri Sembilan	3–1	PKNS	Paroi
22:00 MYT	Flávio 35' (pen.), 61' (pen.); Ferris 69'	Report	73' Morales	Stadium: Tuanku Abdul Rahman Stadium; Referee: Suhaizi Shukri

6 June 2018 14	Negeri Sembilan	1–1	Perak	Paroi
22:00 MYT	Thanabalan 90+5'	Report	71' (o.g.) Flávio	Stadium: Tuanku Abdul Rahman Stadium

9 June 2018 15	Perak	2–0	Negeri Sembilan	Ipoh
22:00 MYT	Brendan Gan 56'; Leandro 89'	Report		Stadium: Perak Stadium; Referee: Fitri Maskon

19 June 2018 16	Negeri Sembilan	1–3	Pahang	Paroi
21:00 MYT	Nasriq (yellow card) 79'; Fauzan 83'; Aiman (yellow card) 90'	Report	Nakajima-Farran 7', 65'; Norshahrul 72', (yellow card) 90+2'	Stadium: Tuanku Abdul Rahman Stadium; Referee: Mohd Nafeez Abdul Wahab

27 June 2018 17	Terengganu	3–2	Negeri Sembilan	Kuala Terengganu
21:00 MYT	Tchétché 32', 57' (pen.), 66'; Kamal Azizi (yellow card) 74'; Suffian (yellow card) 90+5'	Report	Vélez 44', 45+3', (yellow card) 73'; Fakhrul Aiman (yellow card) 56'	Stadium: Sultan Ismail Nasiruddin Shah Stadium; Referee: Wan Mohamad Tarmizi

11 July 2018 18	PKNS	5–3	Negeri Sembilan	Shah Alam
21:00 MYT	Faris 11'; Safee 25'; Bruno Matos 31'; Rodney (yellow card) 45+3'; Romel Morales 47'; Khyril Muhymeen 90+2'	Report	Khairul Anwar 22'; Ilham (yellow card) 45+2'; Flávio Júnior 45+5'; Ángel Guirado 50'; Fauzan (yellow card) 76'	Stadium: Shah Alam Stadium; Referee: Nazmi Nasaruddin

15 July 2018 19	Negeri Sembilan	1–2	PKNP	Paroi
21:00 MYT	Vélez (yellow card) 72', (goal) 79'; Alex Moraes (yellow card) 90+1'	Report	Deevan Raj (yellow card) 47'; Hafiz Ramdan 65'; Khuzaimi (yellow card) 82'; Kim Sang-woo 84'; Fandi (yellow card) 88'	Stadium: Tuanku Abdul Rahman Stadium; Referee: Tuan Yassin Tuan Hanafiah

18 July 2018 20	Negeri Sembilan	3–1	Selangor	Paroi
21:00 MYT	Vélez 12', 74'; Flávio Júnior 18'; Faizal (yellow card) 36'; Aizulridzwan (yellow card) 47'	Report	Rufino Segovia 14'; Saiful (yellow card) 24'; Razman (yellow card) 58'	Stadium: Tuanku Abdul Rahman Stadium; Referee: Zamzaidi Katimin

22 July 2018 21	Kuala Lumpur	2–1	Negeri Sembilan	Cheras
21:00 MYT	Akbarov (yellow card) 21', (goal) 43'; Saifulnizam (yellow card) 36'; Indra Putra (yellow card) 75', (goal) 88'	Report	Alex Moraes 44'; Flávio Júnior (yellow card) 74'	Stadium: Kuala Lumpur Stadium; Referee: Suresh Jayaraman

28 July 2018 22	Negeri Sembilan	1–3	Melaka United	Paroi
21:00 MYT	Fauzan (yellow card) 53'; Guirado (yellow card) 79'; Júnior 90+3'	Report	Ifedayo 49', 66'; Nasriq 64' (o.g.)	Stadium: Tuanku Abdul Rahman Stadium; Referee: Suresh Jayaraman

=== Malaysia FA Cup ===
2 March 2018 Second round	Kedah	1–0 (a.e.t.)	Negeri Sembilan	Alor Setar
21:00 MYT	Baddrol 120'			Stadium: Darul Aman Stadium; Referee: Wan Mohamad Tarmizi

=== Malaysia Challenge Cup ===
==== Group stage ====
Pos	Team	Pld	W	D	L	GF	GA	GD	Pts	Qualification	TER	UKM	NSE	SAR
1	Terengganu II	6	3	3	0	10	6	+4	12	Advance to Semi-finals	—	3–3	1–1	1–0
2	UKM	6	3	1	2	14	10	+4	10	Advance to Semi-finals	1–3	—	2–1	5–1
3	Negeri Sembilan	6	3	1	2	9	6	+3	10		0–1	2–1	—	3–1
4	Sarawak	6	0	1	5	3	14	−11	1		1–1	0–2	0–2	—

Updated to match(es) played on 17 September 2018. Source: FAM FMLLP

7 August 2018 1	Terengganu II	1–0	Negeri Sembilan	Kuala Terengganu
21:00 MYT	Haidhir 46'			Stadium: Sultan Ismail Nasiruddin Shah Stadium

14 August 2018 2	UKM	2–1	Negeri Sembilan	Selayang
21:00 MYT	Michael Ijezie 37', 85'	Report	Ferris Danial 58'	Stadium: Selayang Stadium

28 August 2018 3	Negeri Sembilan	3–1	Sarawak	Paroi
21:00 UTC+8	Nasriq Baharom 19'; Flavio Beck 51', 90+4'	Report	Azizi Ramlee 7'	Stadium: Tuanku Abdul Rahman Stadium

4 September 2018 4	Sarawak	0–2	Negeri Sembilan	Kuching
20:15 UTC+8		Report	Faizal Abu Bakar 86'; Fakrul Aiman Sidid 90+4'	Stadium: Sarawak State Stadium

11 September 2018 5	Negeri Sembilan	2–1	UKM	Paroi
21:00 UTC+8	Fakrul Aiman Sidid 44'; Faizal Abu Bakar 58'		Michael Ijizie 89'	Stadium: Tuanku Abdul Rahman Stadium

17 September 2018 6	Terengganu II	1-1	Negeri Sembilan	Kuala Terengganu
21:00 UTC+8	Akanni Sunday 73'		Mohd Fauzan Dzulkifli 31'	Stadium: Sultan Ismail Nasiruddin Shah Stadium

== Statistics ==
=== Squad appearances ===
As of 17 September 2018

No.	Pos.	Name	League		FA Cup		Challenge Cup		Total
No.	Pos.	Name	Apps	Subs	Apps	Subs	Apps	Subs	Total
1	GK	(Malaysia) Saiful Amar Sudar	2	0	0	0	3	0	5
2	MF	(Malaysia) Aroon Kumar	0	2	0	1	2	0	5
3	DF	(Brazil) Alex Moraes	9	0	0	0	6	0	15
4	DF	(Malaysia) Fauzan Fauzi	12	1	0	0	5	0	18
5	DF	(Malaysia) Rizal Fahmi Rosid	5	0	1	0	3	0	9
6	DF	(Malaysia) Nasriq Baharom	13	2	0	0	4	1	20
7	MF	(Brazil) Flávio Beck Júnior	22	0	1	0	6	0	29
8	MF	(Malaysia) Asraf Roslan	0	0	0	0	0	0	0
9	MF	(Malaysia) Syahid Zaidon	3	3	0	0	0	1	7
10	FW	(Argentina) Nicolás Vélez	13	1	0	0	5	1	19
11	DF	(Malaysia) Aizulridzwan Razali	21	0	1	0	4	1	27
12	GK	(Malaysia) Kaharuddin Rahman	5	1	0	0	2	0	8
13	DF	(Malaysia) Hazrul Mustafa	9	2	1	0	2	0	12
14	FW	(Malaysia) Ferris Danial	8	8	0	1	3	1	21
15	MF	(Malaysia) Fauzan Dzulkifli	8	6	1	0	6	0	21
16	DF	(Malaysia) Kalaiharasan Letchumanan	4	2	0	0	0	1	7
17	MF	(Malaysia) Izuan Salahuddin	3	4	0	0	0	1	8
18	FW	(Malaysia) Khairul Izuan Rosli	6	6	1	0	0	0	13
19	MF	(Malaysia) Khairul Anwar Shahrudin	8	2	1	0	0	0	11
20	MF	(Malaysia) Faizal Abu Bakar	6	4	0	1	4	1	16
21	FW	(Malaysia) Fauzi Latif	1	4	0	0	0	0	5
23	MF	(Malaysia) Nizam Ruslan	0	0	0	0	0	0	0
24	MF	(Malaysia) Aiman Khalidi	11	2	0	0	2	0	15
25	MF	(Malaysia) Thanabalan Nadarajah	7	6	0	0	0	0	13
26	MF	(Malaysia) David Rowley	0	1	0	0	1	3	5
27	GK	(Malaysia) Ilham Amirullah	15	0	1	0	1	0	16
29	MF	(South Korea) Kim Do-heon	14	3	1	0	5	0	23
30	FW	(Malaysia) Fakrul Aiman Sidid	12	7	0	0	6	0	23
55	DF	(Malaysia) Osman Yusoff	8	0	0	0	6	0	14
58	FW	(Philippines) Ángel Guirado	13	0	0	0	6	0	18
Left club during season
22	GK	(Malaysia) Syihan Hazmi Mohamed	1	0	0	0	0	0	1
26	FW	(Cambodia) Prak Mony Udom	4	1	1	0	0	0	6
28	DF	(Latvia) Renārs Rode	10	0	1	0	0	0	11

=== Top scorers ===
As of 17 September 2018

Rnk	Pos.	No.	Player	League	FA Cup	Challenge Cup	Total
1	FW	7	(Brazil) Flávio Beck Júnior	8	0	2	10
2	FW	10	(Argentina) Nicolás Vélez	8	0	0	8
3	MF	25	(Malaysia) Thanabalan Nadarajah	3	0	0	3
3	FW	30	(Malaysia) Fakrul Aiman Sidid	1	0	2	3
5	DF	3	(Brazil) Alex Moraes	2	0	0	2
5	MF	20	(Malaysia) Mohd Faizal Abu Bakar	0	0	2	2
5	FW	58	(Philippines) Ángel Guirado	2	0	0	2
8	MF	14	(Malaysia) Ferris Danial	1	0	1	2
8	MF	15	(Malaysia) Fauzan Dzulkifli	1	0	1	2
10	MF	6	(Malaysia) Mohd Nasriq Baharom	0	0	1	1
10	MF	19	(Malaysia) Khairul Anwar	1	0	0	1
Own goals				0	0	0	0
Total				27	0	9	36

=== Top assists ===
Rnk	Pos.	No.	Player	League	FA Cup	Challenge Cup	Total
1	MF	29	(South Korea) Kim Do-heon	3	0	0	3
2	FW	18	(Malaysia) Khairul Izuan Rosli	2	0	0	2
2	FW	58	(Philippines) Ángel Guirado	2	0	0	2
2	FW	30	(Malaysia) Fakrul Aiman Sidid	2	0	0	2
3	DF	13	(Malaysia) Hazrul Mustafa	1	0	0	1
3	FW	7	(Brazil) Flávio Beck Júnior	1	0	0	1
Total				11	0	0	11

=== Clean sheets ===
As of 17 September 2018

Rnk	No,	Player	League	FA Cup	Challenge Cup	Total
1	1	(Malaysia) Saiful Amar Sudar	1	0	1	2
1	27	(Malaysia) Ilham Amirullah Razali	1	0	0	1
Total			2	0	1	3

=== Disciplinary record ===
Rnk	Pos	No.	Player	Super League			FA Cup			Challenge Cup			Total		
Rnk	Pos	No.	Player	Yellow card	Double yellow card	Red card	Yellow card	Double yellow card	Red card	Yellow card	Double yellow card	Red card	Yellow card	Double yellow card	Red card
1	DF	6	(Malaysia) Nasriq Baharom	4	0	0	0	0	0	0	0	0	4	0	0
1	MF	7	(Brazil) Flávio Beck Júnior	4	0	0	1	0	0	0	0	0	5	0	0
1	DF	11	(Malaysia) Aizulridzwan Razali	4	0	0	1	0	0	0	0	0	5	0	0
2	DF	4	(Malaysia) Fauzan Fauzi	3	0	0	0	0	0	0	0	0	3	0	0
2	DF	3	(Brazil) Alex Moraes	3	0	0	0	0	0	0	0	0	3	0	0
3	MF	20	(Malaysia) Faizal Abu Bakar	2	0	0	0	0	0	0	0	0	2	0	0
3	DF	13	(Malaysia) Hazrul Mustafa	1	0	0	1	0	0	0	0	0	2	0	0
3	MF	17	(Malaysia) Izuan Salahuddin	1	0	0	0	0	0	0	0	0	1	0	0
3	FW	14	(Malaysia) Ferris Danial	1	0	0	0	0	0	0	0	0	1	0	0
3	MF	29	(South Korea) Kim Do-heon	1	0	0	0	0	0	0	0	0	1	0	0
3	MF	24	(Malaysia) Aiman Khalidi	1	0	0	0	0	0	0	0	0	1	0	0
TOTALS				24	0	0	3	0	0	0	0	0	27	0	0

= Number of bookings; = Number of sending offs after a second yellow card; = Number of sending offs by a direct red card.
