= 2019 Negeri Sembilan FA season =

Negeri Sembilan
2019 season
- President: Tunku Syed Razman Tunku Syed Idrus Al-Qadri
- Head coach: Mat Zan Mat Aris
- Stadium: Tuanku Abdul Rahman Stadium
- Malaysia Premier League: 6th
- Malaysia FA Cup: Second round
- Malaysia Cup: Group stage
- Top goalscorer: League: Almir (8); All: Igor Luiz (12)
Home colours	Away colours	Third colours

The 2019 season was Negeri Sembilan's 96th year in their history and 7th season in Malaysia Premier League since it was first introduced in 2004. Also it was the first season in the Malaysia Premier League following relegation 2018 season. Along with the league, the club also participated in the Malaysia FA Cup and the Malaysia Cup.

== Events ==
Negeri Sembilan has got a new head coach, Mat Zan Mat Aris to face the Malaysia Premier League in 2019. Negeri Sembilan has also signed several new players such as Norhafiz Zamani Misbah and Shunsuke Nakatake.

On January 22, 2019, the Negeri Sembilan Football Association (PBNS) has announced that Rhino SEA will sponsor the new kit for the Negeri Sembilan team. The club became the first team in Malaysia and Southeast Asia to collaborate with the brand.

On 15 February 2019, the club was defeated by UiTM FC at home with a heavy defeat of 4–1 in league match.

In April 2019, Negeri Sembilan FC signed new player from Brazil which is Almir on the mid-season.

On 3 August 2019, Negeri Sembilan lost to the Kedah team in the first match of the Malaysia Cup group A stage. The club lost 3–1 at Tuanku Abdul Rahman Stadium.

On 23 August 2019, the club win over Terengganu in the 2019 Malaysia Cup. The result was 3–2.

== Players ==
No.	Name	Age	Nationality	Notes
Goalkeepers
22	Fadzley Rahim	32	(Malaysia)	
12	Kaharuddin Rahman	26	(Malaysia)	
1	Hamka Daud	23	(Malaysia)	
Defenders
3	Adam Othman Arfah	25	(Malaysia)	
16	D. Ganesan	20	(Malaysia)	
18	Osman Yusoff	24	(Malaysia)	
5	Norhafiz Zamani Misbah	36	(Malaysia)	Captain
6	L. Kalaiharasan	22	(Malaysia)	
30	Matheus Vila	26	(Brazil)	
13	Noor Hazrul Mustafa	29	(Malaysia)	
28	Azrul Nizam	23	(Malaysia)	
2	Aroon Kumar	24	(Malaysia)	
4	Fauzan Fauzi	23	(Malaysia)	
15	Danish Haziq	20	(Malaysia)	
Midfielders
8	Abdul Halim Zainal	26	(Malaysia)	
11	Dzulfahmi Abdul Hadi	23	(Malaysia)	
7	Shunsuke Nakatake	28	(Japan)	
	Muhamad Asraf Roslan	22	(Malaysia)	
24	Aiman Khalidi	22	(Malaysia)	
20	Mohd Faizal Abu Bakar	27	(Malaysia)	
Forwards
17	Izuan Salahuddin	26	(Malaysia)	
9	Almir	31	(Brazil)	
10	Thomas Koroma	25	(Sierra Leone)	
21	Fauzi Latif	21	(Malaysia)	
25	Ferris Danial	25	(Malaysia)	
58	Ángel Guirado	33	(Philippines)	

== Competitions ==
=== Malaysia Premier League ===
==== League table ====
Pos	Team	Pld	W	D	L	GF	GA	GD	Pts	Qualification or relegation
1	Sabah (C, P)	20	13	4	3	33	17	+16	43	Promotion to Super League and Qualification for the Malaysia Cup group stage
2	Johor Darul Ta'zim II (Note: Johor Darul Ta'zim II and Terengganu II cannot be promoted from Premier League and play for Malaysia Cup as Johor Darul Ta'zim F.C. and Terengganu F.C. (their parent clubs) remain in Super League and play for Malaysia Cup. Should Johor Darul Ta'zim and Terengganu be relegated to Premier League or will not play for Malaysia Cup, Johor Darul Ta'zim II and Terengganu II will have to drop to M3 League or will play for Malaysia Cup.)	20	9	6	5	31	19	+12	33	
3	PDRM (P)	20	9	3	8	30	27	+3	30	Promotion to Super League and Qualification for the Malaysia Cup group stage
4	Terengganu II	20	8	6	6	21	24	−3	30	
5	UiTM (Note: UiTM F.C. is promoted to replace PKNS F.C. relegated after withdrawing license to complete for the 2020 Malaysia Premier League season as they become feeder club to Selangor FA.) (P)	20	8	5	7	33	25	+8	29	Promotion to Super League and Qualification for the Malaysia Cup group stage
6	Negeri Sembilan	20	8	5	7	29	25	+4	29	Qualification for the Malaysia Cup group stage
7	Penang	20	8	6	6	32	27	+5	24 (Note: Penang have been docked six points following the club’s failure to comply with FIFA’s decision over claims made by former Brazilian import defender, Reinaldo Lobo.)	Qualification for the Malaysia Cup group stage
8	UKM	20	6	4	10	28	32	−4	22	
9	Selangor United	20	6	3	11	24	37	−13	21	
10	Kelantan	20	4	8	8	23	32	−9	17 (Note: Kelantan have been docked three points following the club’s failure to comply with FIFA’s decision over claims made by former technical director Alfredo Carlos Gonzalez.)	
11	Sarawak (R)	20	4	4	12	25	44	−19	16	Qualification to relegation play-off
12	Perlis (Note: Perlis were disqualified on 20 February 2019.)	0	0	0	0	0	0	0	0	Disqualified

Source: MFL
Rules for classification: 1) Points; 2) Goal difference; 3) Number of goals scored.
(C) Champions; (P) Promoted; (R) Relegated

=== Malaysia FA Cup ===
==== Qualified teams ====
The following teams are qualified for the competition. Reserve teams are excluded.

Liga Superthe 12 teams of the 2019 season	Liga Premierthe 9 non-reserve teams of the 2019 season	Liga M3the 14 teams of the 2019 season	Liga M4the 24 teams of the social leagues around Malaysia
Felda United; Johor Darul Ta'zim; Kedah; Kuala Lumpur; Melaka United; Pahang; Perak; PJ City; PKNP; PKNS; Selangor; Terengganu	Kelantan; Negeri Sembilan; PDRM; Penang; Sabah; Sarawak; Selangor United; UiTM; UKM	Armed Forces; Batu Dua; Banggol Tokku; DDM; Glory United; Johor Bahru; Kelantan United; Kuching; Penjara; Protap; Puchong Fuerza; SAMB; Tun Razak; Ultimate	Ampang United; Blastier Galicia; FC Pemanis; ISMA F.C.; Jerantut; Kampung Raja Uda; Kingstown-Klang; Klasiko F.C.; KSR Sains; Kuatagh F.C.; Markless; MD Besut; MOFAH F.C.; MPKJ; MPPD; Newbies F.C.; Persada Integriti Bersatu; Raja Permin; Rawang City; Real Chukai; SA United; Shah Alam Antlers; Klang Southern F.C.; XBBSB

==== Second round ====
The draw for the second round was held on 4 March 2019 at 15:00 involving 12 teams from Liga Super, 9 teams from Liga Premier and 10 teams that progressed from first round. Fourteen matches took place from 2 to 3 April 2019. Postponed match between PDRM and Sarawak will be held on 9 April 2019. Johor Darul Ta'zim received bye into the Third Round.

3 April 2019	Perak (1)	2–1	Negeri Sembilan (2)	Ipoh, Perak
21:00 UTC+8				Stadium: Perak Stadium

=== Malaysia Cup ===
==== Format ====
In the competition, the top eleven teams from the 2019 Malaysia Super League were joined by the top five teams from the 2019 Malaysia Premier League. The teams were drawn into four groups of four teams.

==== Seeding ====
Pot 1	Pot 2	Pot 3	Pot 4
Johor Darul Ta'zimPahangSelangorKedah	PerakMelaka UnitedTerengganuPJ City	PKNSFelda UnitedPKNPSabah	PDRMUiTMNegeri SembilanPulau Pinang

==== Group stage ====
===== Group A =====
Pos	Team	Pld	W	D	L	GF	GA	GD	Pts	Qualification	KED	TER	NSE	PKNS
1	Kedah	6	4	1	1	14	10	+4	13	Advance to knockout stage	—	0–2	4–2	3–2
2	Terengganu	6	4	0	2	14	8	+6	12	Advance to knockout stage	2–3	—	3–1	3–1
3	Negeri Sembilan	6	2	0	4	11	15	−4	6		1–3	3–2	—	1–2
4	PKNS	6	1	1	4	7	13	−6	4		1–1	0–2	1–3	—

Source: FAM MFL

3 August 2019 1	Negeri Sembilan	1–3	Kedah

7 August 2019 2	Negeri Sembilan	1–2	PKNS

17 August 2019 3	Terengganu	3–1	Negeri Sembilan

23 August 2019 4	Negeri Sembilan	3–2	Terengganu

13 September 2019 5	PKNS	1–3	Negeri Sembilan

17 September 2019 6	Kedah	4–2	Negeri Sembilan

== Statistics ==
=== Appearances and goals ===
As of match played 20 July 2019

No.	Pos	Nat	Player	Total		League		FA Cup		Malaysia Cup	
No.	Pos	Nat	Player	Apps	Goals	Apps	Goals	Apps	Goals	Apps	Goals
1	GK	(Malaysia) MAS	Hamka Daud	3	0	2	0	0	0	1	0
2	DF	(Malaysia) MAS	Aroon Kumar	22	0	16	0	1	0	5	0
3	DF	(Malaysia) MAS	Adam Othman Arfah	4	0	2+1	0	0	0	0+1	0
4	MF	(Malaysia) MAS	Abdul Halim Zainal	19	0	12+2	0	1	0	4	0
5	DF	(Malaysia) MAS	Norhafiz Zamani Misbah	16	0	9+2	0	0	0	3+2	0
6	DF	(Malaysia) MAS	Kalaiharasan Letchumanan	13	0	10+2	0	0+1	0	0	0
7	MF	(Japan) JPN	Shunsuke Nakatake	27	4	20	4	1	0	6	0
8	MF	(Malaysia) MAS	Asraf Roslan	6	0	1+5	0	0	0	0	0
9	FW	(Brazil) BRA	Almir	26	10	19	8	1	1	6	1
11	MF	(Malaysia) MAS	Dzulfahmi Abdul Hadi	18	1	11+3	1	0+1	0	1+2	0
12	GK	(Malaysia) MAS	Kaharuddin Rahman	18	0	13	0	1	0	4	0
13	MF	(Malaysia) MAS	Ridzuan Abdunloh	18	2	9+5	2	1	0	0+3	0
14	DF	(Malaysia) MAS	Danial Hadri	14	0	5+3	0	0	0	6	0
15	DF	(Malaysia) MAS	Danish Haziq	6	0	2	0	0	0	2+2	0
16	DF	(Malaysia) MAS	Durrkeswaran Ganasan	8	0	3+4	0	0	0	0+1	0
17	FW	(Malaysia) MAS	Izuan Salahuddin	16	0	6+5	0	1	0	2+2	0
18	DF	(Malaysia) MAS	Osman Yusoff	16	0	11+1	0	1	0	3	0
19	MF	(Malaysia) MAS	Aiman Khalidi	19	0	6+7	0	0+1	0	4+1	0
21	FW	(Malaysia) MAS	Fauzi Latif	6	0	2+4	0	0	0	0	0
22	GK	(Malaysia) MAS	Fadzley Rahim	8	0	5+2	0	0	0	1	0
23	DF	(Malaysia) MAS	Izaaq Izhan	4	0	0+3	0	0	0	0+1	0
25	FW	(Malaysia) MAS	Ferris Danial	22	9	15	4	1	0	6	5
28	DF	(Malaysia) MAS	Azrul Nizam	9	0	6+2	0	1	0	0	0
30	DF	(Brazil) BRA	Matheus Vila	27	2	20	2	1	0	6	0
32	MF	(Malaysia) MAS	Farouq Adam Khan	1	0	1	0	0	0	0	0
60	FW	(Brazil) BRA	Igor Luiz	16	12	10	7	0	0	6	5
Player(s) who left the club but featured in 2019 season
10	FW	(Sierra Leone) SLE	Thomas Koroma	4	0	4	0	0	0	0	0
