= 2018 Malaysia Challenge Cup group stage =

The 2018 Malaysia Challenge Cup group stage featured 8 teams. The teams were drawn into two groups of four, and played each other home-and-away in a round-robin format. The top two teams in each group advanced to the semi-finals.

The group stage will start on 7 August 2018 and concludes on 19 September 2018.

== Groups ==
=== Group A ===
Pos	Team	Pld	W	D	L	GF	GA	GD	Pts	Qualification	TER	UKM	NSE	SAR
1	Terengganu II	6	3	3	0	10	6	+4	12	Advance to Semi-finals	—	3–3	1–1	1–0
2	UKM	6	3	1	2	14	10	+4	10	Advance to Semi-finals	1–3	—	2–1	5–1
3	Negeri Sembilan	6	3	1	2	9	6	+3	10		0–1	2–1	—	3–1
4	Sarawak	6	0	1	5	3	14	−11	1		1–1	0–2	0–2	—

Updated to match(es) played on 17 September 2018. Source: FAM FMLLP
7 August 2018
16:45 UTC+8

UKM	5–1	Sarawak
Michael Ijezie 4', 47', 55', 59', 64'	Report	Dzulazlan Ibrahim 9'

Selayang Stadium, Selayang
7 August 2018
21:00 UTC+8

Negeri Sembilan	0–1	Terengganu II
	Report	Haidhir Suhaini 46'

Tuanku Abdul Rahman Stadium, Paroi

14 August 2018
21:00 UTC+8

Sarawak	1–1	Terengganu II
Dzulazlan Ibrahim 28'	Report	Bruno Suzuki 88'

Sarawak State Stadium, Kuching
14 August 2018
16:45 UTC+8

UKM	2–1	Negeri Sembilan
Michael Ijezie 37', 85'	Report	Ferris Danial 58'

Selayang Stadium, Selayang

28 August 2018
21:00 UTC+8

Negeri Sembilan	3–1	Sarawak
Nasriq Baharom 19'; Flavio Beck 51', 90+4'	Report	Azizi Ramlee 7'

Tuanku Abdul Rahman Stadium, Paroi
28 August 2018
21:00 UTC+8

Terengganu II	3–3	UKM
Haidhir Suhaini 20'; Bruno Suzuki 40'; Akanni Sunday 90+2'	Report	Michael Ijizie 46' (pen.); Irwan Syazwin 58'; Sein Nam 90'

Sultan Ismail Nasiruddin Shah Stadium, Kuala Terengganu

4 September 2018
20:15 UTC+8

Sarawak	0–2	Negeri Sembilan
	Report	Faizal Abu Bakar 86'; Fakrul Aiman Sidid 90+4'

Sarawak State Stadium, Kuching
4 September 2018
16:45 UTC+8

UKM	1–3	Terengganu II
Michael Ijizie 35' (pen.)	Report	Sébastien Thurière 5'; Akanni Sunday 26', 65'

Selayang Stadium, Selayang

11 September 2018
20:15 UTC+8

Terengganu II	1–0	Sarawak
Sharin Sapien 52'

Sultan Ismail Nasiruddin Shah Stadium, Kuala Terengganu
11 September 2018
21:00 UTC+8

Negeri Sembilan	2–1	UKM
Fakrul Aiman Sidid 44'; Faizal Abu Bakar 58'		Michael Ijizie 89'

Tuanku Abdul Rahman Stadium, Paroi

17 September 2018
20:15 UTC+8

Sarawak	0-2	UKM
		Michael Ijizie 19'; Faiz Hanif 58'

Sarawak State Stadium, Kuching
17 September 2018
21:00 UTC+8

Terengganu II	1-1	Negeri Sembilan
Akanni Sunday 73'		Mohd Fauzan Dzulkifli 31'

Sultan Ismail Nasiruddin Shah Stadium, Kuala Terengganu

=== Group B ===
Pos	Team	Pld	W	D	L	GF	GA	GD	Pts	Qualification	JDT	ATM	UiTM	PEN
1	Johor Darul Ta'zim II	6	4	1	1	15	4	+11	13	Advance to Semi-finals	—	2–0	0–0	4–0
2	ATM	6	3	1	2	5	5	0	10	Advance to Semi-finals	2–1	—	1–0	0–0
3	UiTM	6	1	2	3	4	6	−2	5		2–3	2–0	—	0–0
4	Penang	6	1	2	3	3	11	−8	5		1–5	0–2	2–0	—

Updated to match(es) played on 18 September 2018. Source: FAM FMLLP
8 August 2018
21:00 UTC+8

UiTM	2–3	Johor Darul Ta'zim II
Afif Asyraf 42'; Amer Azahar 75'	Report	D. Saarvindran 68'; Amirul Hadi 85'; S. Kumaahran 90'

UiTM Stadium, Shah Alam
8 August 2018
21:00 UTC+8

Penang	0–2	ATM
	Report	Zaironi Yusof 27'; Shahrudin Shafie 81'

Penang State Stadium, Batu Kawan

15 August 2018
21:00 UTC+8

Johor Darul Ta'zim II	4–0	Penang
Bruno Soares 6'; Nicholas Fernàndez 28', 36'; D. Saarvindran	Report

Pasir Gudang Stadium, Pasir Gudang
15 August 2018
21:00 UTC+8

UiTM	2–0	ATM
Timothy Okereke 20'; Anwarul Hafiz 45+2'	Report

UiTM Stadium, Shah Alam

29 August 2018
16:45 UTC+8

ATM	2–1	Johor Darul Ta'zim II
Rafizol Roslan 68'; Venice Elphi 89'	Report	Junior Eldstål 65'

Selayang Stadium, Selayang
29 August 2018
21:00 UTC+8

Penang	2–0	UiTM
K. Thivandaran 61'; Raimi 78'	Report

Penang State Stadium, Batu Kawan

5 September 2018
20:15 UTC+8

Johor Darul Ta'zim II	2–0	ATM
Khairullah AbdulHalim 24'; Amirul Hadi 35'

Pasir Gudang Stadium, Pasir Gudang
5 September 2018
20:15 UTC+8

UiTM	0–0	Penang
	Report

UiTM Stadium, Shah Alam

12 September 2018
20:15 UTC+8

Penang	1-5	Johor Darul Ta'zim II
Alafi Mahmud 90+1'		Norhafiz Zamani Misbah 18' (o.g.); Nicolás Fernández 40' (pen.); Rozaimi Rahman 43'; Mohd Amer Saidin 72'; Shahwan Shaharudin 79'

Penang State Stadium, Batu Kawan
12 September 2018
16:45 UTC+8

ATM	1-0	UiTM
Raja Ridzuwan 88'

Selayang Stadium, Selayang

18 September 2018
20:15 UTC+8

Johor Darul Ta'zim II	0–0	UiTM

Pasir Gudang Stadium, Pasir Gudang
18 September 2018
20:15 UTC+8

ATM	0–0	Penang

Shah Alam Stadium, Shah Alam
