= List of Malaysian football second transfers 2019 =

This is a list of Malaysian football transfers for the 2019 second transfer window. Only transfers featuring Malaysia Super League and Malaysia Premier League are listed. For the Malaysia M3 League featured for selected clubs only.

The transfer window closed 29 May 2019.

== Malaysia Super League ==
Note: Flags indicate national team as has been defined under FIFA eligibility rules. Players may hold more than one non-FIFA nationality.

=== Felda United ===
In:

No.	Pos.	Nation	Player
9	FW	(Singapore) SGP	Khairul Amri (from (Singapore) Tampines Rovers)

Out:

No.	Pos.	Nation	Player
9	FW	(Brazil) BRA	Thiago Quirino

=== Kedah ===
In:

No.	Pos.	Nation	Player
55	MF	(Malaysia) MAS	David Rowley (from Kelantan)
60	MF	(Kyrgyzstan) KGZ	Edgar Bernhardt (from (Poland) GKS Tychy)

Out:

No.	Pos.	Nation	Player
6	MF	(Iraq) IRQ	Anmar Almubaraki

=== Kuala Lumpur ===
In:

No.	Pos.	Nation	Player
2	DF	(Malaysia) MAS	Raphi Azizan (from Puchong Fuerza)
9	MF	(Serbia) SRB	Darko Marković (on loan from Sabah)
12	FW	(Malaysia) MAS	Fakri Saarani
51	DF	(South Korea) KOR	Noh Haeng-seok (from (South Korea) Busan IPark)
55	FW	(Malaysia) MAS	Shafiq Shaharudin (on loan from PKNS)

Out:

No.	Pos.	Nation	Player
7	MF	(Japan) JPN	Ryutaro Karube (to (Thailand) Chainat Hornbill)
9	FW	(Netherlands) NED	Sylvano Comvalius (to (Indonesia) Arema)

=== Melaka United ===
In:

No.	Pos.	Nation	Player
1	GK	(Malaysia) MAS	Solehin Mamat (from Kuala Lumpur)
7	MF	(Croatia) CRO	Dominik Balić (from (Croatia) Dugopolje)
9	FW	(Ivory Coast) CIV	Davy Angan (from (Malta) Mosta)
10	MF	(Serbia) SRB	Luka Milunović (loan return from Sabah)
24	MF	(Malaysia) MAS	Faizal Abu Bakar

Out:

No.	Pos.	Nation	Player
1	GK	(Malaysia) MAS	Syafizullah Ab Wahab (on loan to SAMB)
7	MF	(Montenegro) MNE	Darko Marković (on loan to Kuala Lumpur)
9	FW	(Brazil) BRA	Casagrande (on loan to Penang)
10	MF	(Kosovo) KOS	Liridon Krasniqi
17	FW	(Malaysia) MAS	Nurshamil Ghani (on loan to Selangor United)
24	MF	(Malaysia) MAS	Gopinathan Ramachandra (on loan to PDRM)
28	FW	(Malaysia) MAS	Wan Mohd Syukri (on loan to Penang)

=== Pahang ===
In:

No.	Pos.	Nation	Player
11	FW	(Namibia) NAM	Lazarus Kaimbi

Out:

No.	Pos.	Nation	Player
11	FW	(Brazil) BRA	Zé Eduardo

=== Perak ===
In:

No.	Pos.	Nation	Player
5	DF	(Lebanon) LBN	Hussein Eldor (from (India) Churchill Brothers)
9	FW	(Brazil) BRA	Ronaldo (from (Brazil) XV de Piracicaba)
30	FW	(Brazil) BRA	Careca (from (Brazil) Atlético Acreano)

Out:

No.	Pos.	Nation	Player
2	DF	(Malaysia) MAS	Syazwan Zaipol (on loan to PKNP)
6	DF	(Australia) AUS	Zac Anderson
8	MF	(Brazil) BRA	Wander Luiz
9	FW	(Brazil) BRA	Gilmar (to (Brazil) Cuiabá)
28	DF	(Malaysia) MAS	Nazirul Afif (on loan to PKNP)

=== Petaling Jaya City ===
In:

No.	Pos.	Nation	Player
9	FW	(Brazil) BRA	Washington Brandão (from (Indonesia) Persela Lamongan)
24	DF	(Malaysia) MAS	Nasriq Baharom (from Perlis)
29	FW	(Timor-Leste) TLS	Pedro Henrique (from (Thailand) Samut Sakhon)

Out:

No.	Pos.	Nation	Player
4	DF	(Philippines) PHI	Joshua Grommen
7	MF	(Malaysia) MAS	Yoges Muniandy (on loan to Penang)
9	FW	(Brazil) BRA	Pedro Henrique

=== PKNP ===
In:

No.	Pos.	Nation	Player
8	DF	(Brazil) BRA	Pedro Victor (from (Brazil) Noroeste)
12	DF	(Malaysia) MAS	Nazirul Afif (on loan from Perak)
15	DF	(Malaysia) MAS	Syazwan Zaipol (on loan from Perak)
20	FW	(Brazil) BRA	Ramón (from (Brazil) Juventus)
23	FW	(Malaysia) MAS	Hafidz Ahmad Kamarudin
–	DF	(Malaysia) MAS	Aidil Azuan (from Melaka U19)

Out:

No.	Pos.	Nation	Player
5	DF	(Tajikistan) TJK	Siyovush Asrorov
12	MF	(Ghana) GHA	Thomas Abbey
18	FW	(Senegal) SEN	Kalidou Yero

=== PKNS ===
In:

No.	Pos.	Nation	Player
26	FW	(Malaysia) MAS	Shafiq Shaharudin (on loan from Kuala Lumpur)
29	FW	(Thailand) THA	Kittiphong Pluemjai (from (Norway) Lysekloster IL)

Out:

No.	Pos.	Nation	Player
29	FW	(Cambodia) CAM	Chan Vathanaka (to (Cambodia) Boeung Ket Angkor)

=== Selangor ===
In:

No.	Pos.	Nation	Player
12	FW	(Nigeria) NGA	Ifedayo Olusegun (from (Bahrain) Al-Riffa)

Out:

No.	Pos.	Nation	Player
10	FW	(Spain) ESP	Rufino

=== Terengganu ===
In:

No.	Pos.	Nation	Player
14	FW	(Malaysia) MAS	Nabil Latpi (from Ultimate)

Out:

No.	Pos.	Nation	Player
24	DF	(Serbia) SRB	Igor Zonjić

== Malaysia Premier League ==
=== Johor Darul Ta'zim II ===
In:

No.	Pos.	Nation	Player
10	FW	(Argentina) ARG	Nicolás Fernández
–	DF	(Malaysia) MAS	Firdaus Abd Jabar (from Johor Darul Ta'zim III)

Out:

No.	Pos.	Nation	Player
9	MF	(Argentina) ARG	Lucas Ontivero
25	DF	(Malaysia) MAS	Hariz Kamarudin (to Johor Darul Ta'zim III)

=== Kelantan ===
In:

No.	Pos.	Nation	Player
51	FW	(France) FRA	L´Imam Seydi (from Batu Dua)

Out:

No.	Pos.	Nation	Player
1	GK	(Malaysia) MAS	Muhammad Nor Amin
4	DF	(Brazil) BRA	Cássio
7	MF	(Brazil) BRA	Flávio (to (Indonesia) Bhayangkara)
8	MF	(Malaysia) MAS	David Rowley (to Kedah)
10	MF	(Afghanistan) AFG	Mustafa Zazai (to (Cambodia) Phnom Penh Crown)
14	FW	(Uruguay) URU	Raúl Tarragona (to (Uruguay) Rentistas)
16	MF	(Malaysia) MAS	Badhri Radzi (to Kelantan United)
23	FW	(Malaysia) MAS	Afiq Saluddin
25	DF	(Malaysia) MAS	Ridhwan Deraman (to Kelantan United)
33	GK	(Malaysia) MAS	Damien Lim (to Selangor United)

=== Negeri Sembilan ===
In:

No.	Pos.	Nation	Player
10	FW	(Brazil) BRA	Igor Carioca (from (Thailand) Sisaket)

Out:

No.	Pos.	Nation	Player
10	FW	(Sierra Leone) SLE	Thomas Koroma

=== PDRM ===
In:

No.	Pos.	Nation	Player
17	MF	(Malaysia) MAS	Stuart Wark (from Penang)
24	MF	(Malaysia) MAS	Gopinathan Ramachandra (on loan from Melaka United)
28	FW	(Nigeria) NGA	Uche Agba (from (Bahrain) Al-Hidd)
52	GK	(Malaysia) MAS	Bryan See Tian Keat (from (Thailand) Bangkok)
55	DF	(Malaysia) MAS	Farid Ramli (on loan from Kuala Lumpur)

Out:

No.	Pos.	Nation	Player
7	FW	(Malaysia) MAS	Arif Mat Asin (to Ultimate)
17	DF	(Malaysia) MAS	Syazwan Azizan (to Ultimate)
22	GK	(Malaysia) MAS	Farzly Muhammad (to Ultimate)
24	MF	(Malaysia) MAS	Syahid Zaidon
28	MF	(Brazil) BRA	Andrezinho

=== Penang ===
In:

No.	Pos.	Nation	Player
1	GK	(Malaysia) MAS	Zamir Selamat (from Batu Dua)
6	FW	(Malaysia) MAS	Wan Mohd Syukri (on loan from Melaka United)
9	FW	(Brazil) BRA	Casagrande (on loan from Melaka United)
16	MF	(Argentina) ARG	Sergio Aguero (from Selangor United)
24	MF	(Malaysia) MAS	Syukur Saidin (from Perlis)
52	MF	(Malaysia) MAS	Yoges Muniandy (on loan from Petaling Jaya City)
–	MF	(Malaysia) MAS	Amirul Syazani

Out:

No.	Pos.	Nation	Player
1	GK	(Malaysia) MAS	Syamim Othman
6	MF	(Malaysia) MAS	Stuart Wark (to PDRM)
9	FW	(Australia) AUS	Ndumba Makeche
19	MF	(Haiti) HAI	Sébastien Thurière
20	FW	(Malaysia) MAS	Ramze Othman
27	DF	(Malaysia) MAS	Asyraf Rojani
28	DF	(Malaysia) MAS	Khairul Rosmadi

=== Sabah ===
In:

No.	Pos.	Nation	Player
7	MF	(Turkmenistan) TKM	Ahmet Ataýew (from (Indonesia) Persela Lamongan)
10	FW	(Angola) ANG	Aguinaldo (from (Romania) Politehnica Iași)

Out:

No.	Pos.	Nation	Player
7	FW	(Brazil) BRA	Luiz Júnior
10	MF	(Serbia) SRB	Luka Milunović (loan return to Melaka United)

=== Sarawak ===
In:

No.	Pos.	Nation	Player
14	FW	(Brazil) BRA	Rodrigo Oliveira

Out:

No.	Pos.	Nation	Player
10	FW	(Bosnia and Herzegovina) BIH	Muamer Salibasic

=== Selangor United ===
In:

No.	Pos.	Nation	Player
9	FW	(Montenegro) MNE	Danko Kovačević (from (Montenegro) Iskra Danilovgrad)
10	FW	(South Korea) KOR	Hwang Sin-young (from (South Korea) Cheongju)
19	FW	(Malaysia) MAS	Nurshamil Abd Ghani (on loan from Melaka United)
29	GK	(Malaysia) MAS	Damien Lim (from Kelantan)

Out:

No.	Pos.	Nation	Player
9	FW	(Iraq) IRQ	Eslam Mohamed Zaki
16	MF	(Argentina) ARG	Sergio Aguero (to Penang)
19	MF	(Malaysia) MAS	Norhafizzuan Jailani
29	GK	(Malaysia) MAS	Syazwan Yusoff (to Kelantan United)

=== UiTM ===
In:

No.	Pos.	Nation	Player
9	FW	(Brazil) BRA	Maycon Calijuri (from (Myanmar) Shan United)
20	MF	(South Korea) KOR	Park Yong-joon (from (South Korea) Cheongju)
–	DF	(Malaysia) MAS	Zairul Fitree (from D'AR Wanderers)
–	MF	(Malaysia) MAS	Adib Rosli (from D'AR Wanderers)
28	MF	(Kyrgyzstan) KGZ	Akhlidin Israilov (from (Uzbekistan) Andijon)

Out:

No.	Pos.	Nation	Player
9	MF	(Malaysia) MAS	Zulkifli Zakaria
17	FW	(Senegal) SEN	Robert Mendy
20	FW	(Brunei) BRU	Adi Said (to (Brunei) DPMM)
22	MF	(Malaysia) MAS	Megat Zakwan
28	MF	(Kyrgyzstan) KGZ	Akhlidin Israilov

=== UKM ===
In:

No.	Pos.	Nation	Player
–		(Malaysia) MAS	Hasif Norhaizan (from youth team)
–		(Malaysia) MAS	Ainool Haqqiem (from youth team)
–		(Malaysia) MAS	Aliff Jamaluddin

Out:

No.	Pos.	Nation	Player
12		(Malaysia) MAS	Hafidzatullah Lazim (on loan to Kuala Lumpur U19)
25	FW	(Malaysia) MAS	Tuan Muqris (on loan to Terengganu IV)
29	FW	(Malaysia) MAS	Asyraaf Mat Pushni (on loan to Kuala Lumpur U21)

== Malaysia M3 League ==
=== Kelantan United ===
In:

No.	Pos.	Nation	Player
6	DF	(Malaysia) MAS	Aiman Yusoff (from Kelantan U21)
9	FW	(Malaysia) MAS	Nizad Ayub (from Perak)
16	MF	(Malaysia) MAS	Badhri Radzi (from Kelantan)
24	DF	(Malaysia) MAS	Amirizdwan Taj (from Kelantan)
29	MF	(The Gambia) GAM	Gassama Alfussaini
31	MF	(Malaysia) MAS	Masri Asyraf
33	MF	(Malaysia) MAS	Azrean Aziz (from Terengganu II)
35	DF	(Malaysia) MAS	Ridhwan Derawan (from Kelantan)

Out:

No.	Pos.	Nation	Player
—	DF	(Malaysia) MAS	Azmi Hamzah
—	DF	(Malaysia) MAS	Fadzlie Abdullah
16	MF	(Malaysia) MAS	Faizol Fazree
24	DF	(Malaysia) MAS	Azri Azam
—	MF	(Malaysia) MAS	Zailani Ramli
9	MF	(Madagascar) MAD	Dimitri Carlos Zozimar (to Batu Dua)
