= 2021 Royal Malaysia Police Football Club season =

PDRM
2021 season
- President: Noor Rashid Ibrahim
- Head coach: Wan Rohaimi
- Stadium: Kuala Lumpur Stadium
- Malaysia Premier League: 6th
- Malaysia Cup: Pre-season
- Top goalscorer: League: Bruno Suzuki (5); All: Bruno Suzuki (5)

The 2021 season is PDRM's 31st season in existence and the first season in the Malaysia Premier League since relegation from Malaysia Super League last year.

== Players ==
=== First-team squad ===
As of 22 February 2021

Note: Flags indicate national team as defined under FIFA eligibility rules; some limited exceptions apply. Players may hold more than one non-FIFA nationality.

No.	Pos.	Nation	Player
1	GK	MAS	Hamka Daud
4	MF	MAS	Nizam Rodzi
5	DF	MAS	Kalaiharasan Letchumanan
6	DF	MAS	Afiq Azuan
7	MF	MAS	Saiful Hasnol
8	MF	GHA	Alexander Amponsah
9	FW	MAS	Khairul Izuan
10	FW	JPN	Bruno Suzuki
11	FW	NAM	Lazarus Kaimbi (captain)
12	DF	MAS	Izzat Zuhairie
13	MF	MAS	Durrkeswaran Ganasan
16	MF	MAS	Syafiq Azmi
17	MF	MAS	Amirul Wa'ie
18	MF	MAS	Shahrul Igwan

No.	Pos.	Nation	Player
19	DF	MAS	Amir Saiful
20	FW	ARG	Alvaro Cuello
22	MF	MAS	Nurfais Johari
23	MF	MAS	Safiee Ahmad
24	DF	MAS	Syuhiran Zainal
25	DF	MAS	Hafif Jazimin
26	DF	MAS	Aliff Naquiddin
27	DF	MAS	Eskandar Ismail
29	MF	MAS	Azrie Reza (on loan from Penang)
30	MF	MAS	Nabil Latpi
33	GK	MAS	Asri Muhamad
37	MF	MAS	Hidhir Idris
55	GK	MAS	Willfred Jabun

== Statistics ==
=== Appearances and goals ===
As of 11 August 2021

No.	Pos	Nat	Player	Total		League	
No.	Pos	Nat	Player	Apps	Goals	Apps	Goals
1	GK	(Malaysia) MAS	Hamka Daud	3	0	2+1	0
4	MF	(Malaysia) MAS	Nizam Rodzi	7	0	1+6	0
5	DF	(Malaysia) MAS	Kalaiharasan Letchumanan	15	0	15	0
6	DF	(Malaysia) MAS	Afiq Azuan	13	0	11+2	0
7	MF	(Malaysia) MAS	Saiful Hasnol	5	0	5	0
8	MF	(Ghana) GHA	Alexander Amponsah	15	1	14+1	1
9	FW	(Malaysia) MAS	Khairul Izuan	2	0	0+2	0
10	FW	(Japan) JPN	Bruno Suzuki	13	5	10+3	5
11	FW	(Namibia) NAM	Lazarus Kaimbi	13	4	13	4
12	DF	(Malaysia) MAS	Iqbal Azmi	4	0	3+1	0
13	MF	(Malaysia) MAS	Durrkeswaran Ganasan	12	0	11+1	0
16	MF	(Malaysia) MAS	Syafiq Azmi	2	0	1+1	0
17	MF	(Malaysia) MAS	Amirul Wa'ie	15	2	10+5	2
18	MF	(Malaysia) MAS	Shahrul Igwan	9	0	5+4	0
19	DF	(Malaysia) MAS	Amir Saiful	13	0	13	0
20	FW	(Argentina) ARG	Alvaro Cuello	5	0	4+1	0
22	MF	(Malaysia) MAS	Nurfais Johari	2	0	1+1	0
23	MF	(Malaysia) MAS	Safiee Ahmad	11	0	8+3	0
24	DF	(Malaysia) MAS	Syuhiran Zainal	2	0	1+1	0
26	DF	(Malaysia) MAS	Aliff Naquiddin	8	0	6+2	0
27	DF	(Malaysia) MAS	Eskandar Ismail	9	0	3+6	0
29	MF	(Malaysia) MAS	Azrie Reza	5	0	5	0
30	MF	(Malaysia) MAS	Nabil Latpi	12	3	5+7	3
33	GK	(Malaysia) MAS	Asri Muhamad	15	0	14+1	0
37	MF	(Malaysia) MAS	Hidhir Idris	15	1	11+4	1
42	DF	(Zimbabwe) ZIM	Victor Kahumka	6	0	6	0
22	FW	(Malaysia) MAS	Azizul Ikhwan	1	0	0+1	0
