= 2021 Polis Diraja Malaysia FC season =

Polis Di-Raja Malaysia
2021 season
- President: Acryl Sani
- CEO: Hafiz Zainal Abidin
- Head coach: Wan Rohaimi Wan Ismail
- Stadium: KLFA Stadium
- Malaysia Premier League: 8th
- Top goalscorer: League: Bruno Suzuki (7); All: Bruno Suzuki (7)

The 2021 season was Polis Di-Raja Malaysia's 31st season in existence and the first season in the Malaysia Premier League since relegation from Malaysia Super League last year. Along with the league, the club will also participate in the Malaysia Cup.

== Overview ==
On 24 December 2020, Mat Zan Mat Aris has been appointed as club's new head coach on two-year contract.

On 28 February 2021, Lazarus Kaimbi and Bruno Suzuki joined the club.

On 31 March 2021, Wan Rohaimi Wan Ismail joined as club's new head coach after Mat Zan Mat Aris contract has been terminated.

== Players ==
=== First-team squad ===
As of 22 February 2021

Note: Flags indicate national team as defined under FIFA eligibility rules; some limited exceptions apply. Players may hold more than one non-FIFA nationality.

| No. | Pos. | Nation | Player |
|---|---|---|---|
| 1 | GK | MAS | Hamka Daud |
| 4 | MF | MAS | Nizam Rodzi |
| 5 | DF | MAS | Kalaiharasan Letchumanan |
| 6 | DF | MAS | Afiq Azuan |
| 7 | MF | MAS | Saiful Hasnol |
| 8 | MF | GHA | Alexander Amponsah |
| 9 | FW | MAS | Khairul Izuan |
| 10 | FW | JPN | Bruno Suzuki |
| 11 | FW | NAM | Lazarus Kaimbi (captain) |
| 12 | DF | MAS | Izzat Zuhairie |
| 13 | MF | MAS | Durrkeswaran Ganasan |
| 16 | MF | MAS | Syafiq Azmi |
| 17 | MF | MAS | Amirul Wa'ie |
| 18 | MF | MAS | Shahrul Igwan |

| No. | Pos. | Nation | Player |
|---|---|---|---|
| 19 | DF | MAS | Amir Saiful |
| 20 | FW | ARG | Alvaro Cuello |
| 22 | MF | MAS | Nurfais Johari |
| 23 | MF | MAS | Safiee Ahmad |
| 24 | DF | MAS | Syuhiran Zainal |
| 25 | DF | MAS | Hafif Jazimin |
| 26 | DF | MAS | Aliff Naquiddin |
| 27 | DF | MAS | Eskandar Ismail |
| 29 | MF | MAS | Azrie Reza (on loan from Penang) |
| 30 | MF | MAS | Nabil Latpi |
| 33 | GK | MAS | Asri Muhamad |
| 37 | MF | MAS | Hidhir Idris (on loan from Kedah Darul Aman) |
| 55 | GK | MAS | Willfred Jabun |

== Competitions ==
=== Malaysia Premier League ===
==== League table ====
| Pos | Team | Pld | W | D | L | GF | GA | GD | Pts | Qualification or relegation |
|---|---|---|---|---|---|---|---|---|---|---|
| 6 | Kelantan | 20 | 8 | 3 | 9 | 23 | 28 | −5 | 27 | Qualification for the Malaysia Cup group stage |
| 7 | Kelantan United | 20 | 8 | 2 | 10 | 25 | 28 | −3 | 26 | Qualification for the Malaysia Cup group stage |
| 8 | PDRM | 20 | 7 | 5 | 8 | 22 | 25 | −3 | 26 | |
| 9 | Selangor II (Note: Johor Darul Ta'zim II, Perak II, Selangor II and Terengganu II cannot be promoted from Malaysia Premier League and play in Malaysia Cup as Johor Darul Ta'zim F.C., Perak FA, Selangor F.C. and Terengganu FC (their parent clubs) remain in Malaysia Super League and play in Malaysia Cup. Should the team be relegated to Malaysia Premier League or will not play in Malaysia Cup, Johor Darul Ta'zim II, Perak II, Selangor II and Terengganu II will have to drop to Malaysia M3 League or will play in Malaysia Cup.) | 20 | 5 | 9 | 6 | 27 | 26 | +1 | 24 | |
| 10 | Perak II (R) | 20 | 4 | 5 | 11 | 14 | 37 | −23 | 17 | |

Source: MFL
Rules for classification: 1) Points; 2) Goal difference; 3) Number of goals scored.
(R) Relegated

==== Matches ====
Win Draw Loss

| 6 March 2021 1 | PDRM | 0–3 | Selangor II |
| MYT (UTC+8) |

| 10 March 2021 2 | Kelantan United | 2–0 | PDRM |
| MYT (UTC+8) |

| 13 March 2021 3 | PDRM | 1–2 | Kelantan |
| MYT (UTC+8) |

| 16 March 2021 4 | FAM-MSN Project | 1–3 | PDRM |
| MYT (UTC+8) |

| 20 March 2021 5 | PDRM | 1–2 | Kuching City |
| MYT (UTC+8) |

| 3 April 2021 6 | Terengganu II | 1–1 | PDRM |
| MYT (UTC+8) |

| 7 April 2021 7 | Johor Darul Ta'zim II | 1–0 | PDRM |
| MYT (UTC+8) |

| 11 April 2021 8 | PDRM | 1–1 | Perak II |
| MYT (UTC+8) |

| 16 April 2021 9 | Sarawak United | 0–2 | PDRM |
| MYT (UTC+8) |

| 2 May 2021 10 | PDRM | 0–1 | Negeri Sembilan |
| MYT (UTC+8) |

| 8 May 2021 11 | Selangor II | 0–1 | PDRM |
| MYT (UTC+8) |

| 25 July 2021 12 | PDRM | 1–0 | Kelantan United |
| MYT (UTC+8) |

| 28 July 2021 13 | Kelantan | 1–2 | PDRM |
| MYT (UTC+8) |

| 1 August 2021 14 | PDRM | 0–0 | FAM-MSN Project |
| MYT (UTC+8) |

| 8 August 2021 15 | PDRM | 2–1 | Terengganu II |
| MYT (UTC+8) |

| 11 August 2021 16 | PDRM | 2–2 | Johor Darul Ta'zim II |
| MYT (UTC+8) |

| 22 August 2021 17 | Perak II | 0–3 | PDRM |
| MYT (UTC+8) |

| 27 August 2021 18 | PDRM | 0–3 | Sarawak United |
| MYT (UTC+8) |

| 4 September 2021 19 | Kuching City | 0–0 | PDRM |
| MYT (UTC+8) |

| 21 September 2021 20 | Negeri Sembilan | 4–2 | PDRM |
| MYT (UTC+8) |

== Statistics ==
=== Appearances and goals ===
As of 21 September 2021

| No. | Pos | Nat | Player | Total | | League | |
| No. | Pos | Nat | Player | Apps | Goals | Apps | Goals |
|---|---|---|---|---|---|---|---|
| 1 | GK | (Malaysia) MAS | Hamka Daud | 4 | 0 | 3+1 | 0 |
| 4 | MF | (Malaysia) MAS | Nizam Rodzi | 8 | 0 | 1+7 | 0 |
| 5 | DF | (Malaysia) MAS | Kalaiharasan Letchumanan | 19 | 0 | 19 | 0 |
| 6 | DF | (Malaysia) MAS | Afiq Azuan | 17 | 0 | 14+3 | 0 |
| 7 | MF | (Malaysia) MAS | Saiful Hasnol | 8 | 0 | 6+2 | 0 |
| 8 | MF | (Ghana) GHA | Alexander Amponsah | 18 | 1 | 17+1 | 1 |
| 9 | FW | (Malaysia) MAS | Khairul Izuan | 2 | 0 | 0+2 | 0 |
| 10 | FW | (Japan) JPN | Bruno Suzuki | 17 | 7 | 14+3 | 7 |
| 11 | FW | (Namibia) NAM | Lazarus Kaimbi | 13 | 4 | 13 | 4 |
| 12 | DF | (Malaysia) MAS | Izzat Zuhairie | 6 | 0 | 3+3 | 0 |
| 13 | MF | (Malaysia) MAS | Durrkeswaran Ganasan | 15 | 1 | 14+1 | 1 |
| 16 | MF | (Malaysia) MAS | Syafiq Azmi | 3 | 0 | 1+2 | 0 |
| 17 | MF | (Malaysia) MAS | Amirul Wa'ie | 19 | 2 | 11+8 | 2 |
| 18 | MF | (Malaysia) MAS | Shahrul Igwan | 9 | 0 | 5+4 | 0 |
| 19 | DF | (Malaysia) MAS | Amir Saiful | 16 | 0 | 16 | 0 |
| 20 | FW | (Argentina) ARG | Alvaro Cuello | 8 | 0 | 5+3 | 0 |
| 22 | MF | (Malaysia) MAS | Nurfais Johari | 5 | 0 | 4+1 | 0 |
| 23 | MF | (Malaysia) MAS | Safiee Ahmad | 14 | 0 | 9+5 | 0 |
| 24 | DF | (Malaysia) MAS | Syuhiran Zainal | 2 | 0 | 1+1 | 0 |
| 26 | DF | (Malaysia) MAS | Aliff Naquiddin | 8 | 0 | 6+2 | 0 |
| 27 | DF | (Malaysia) MAS | Eskandar Ismail | 13 | 0 | 7+6 | 0 |
| 29 | MF | (Malaysia) MAS | Azrie Reza | 9 | 1 | 9 | 1 |
| 30 | MF | (Malaysia) MAS | Nabil Latpi | 14 | 4 | 7+7 | 4 |
| 33 | GK | (Malaysia) MAS | Asri Muhamad | 18 | 0 | 17+1 | 0 |
| 37 | MF | (Malaysia) MAS | Hidhir Idris | 18 | 1 | 14+4 | 1 |
| 42 | DF | (Zimbabwe) ZIM | Victor Kahumka | 6 | 0 | 6 | 0 |
| 22 | FW | (Malaysia) MAS | Azizul Ikhwan | 1 | 0 | 0+1 | 0 |
Players transferred out during the season
| 12 | DF | (Malaysia) MAS | Iqbal Azmi | 1 | 0 | 0+1 | 0 |
