= 2020 UKM F.C. season =

UKM F.C.
2020 season
- Owner: National University of Malaysia
- Head coach: Sulaiman Hussin
- Stadium: Selayang Municipal Council Stadium
- Malaysia Premier League: 9th
- Top goalscorer: League: Akanni-Sunday Wasiu (4); All: Akanni-Sunday Wasiu (4)

The 2020 season was the eighth season in the existence of UKM Football Club and the club's third consecutive season in the Malaysia Premier League.

== Season events ==
On 24 February 2020, the club has announced the players for 2020 season.

On 16 December 2020, Football Association of Malaysia has decided to reject the club appeals after finding that the documents submitted showed the club did not have the financial standings to survive for one season.

== Players ==
As of 11 June 2020.

Note: Flags indicate national team as defined under FIFA eligibility rules; some limited exceptions apply. Players may hold more than one non-FIFA nationality.

| No. | Pos. | Nation | Player |
|---|---|---|---|
| 1 | DF | (Malaysia) MAS | Syed Irfan Syafiq |
| 2 | DF | (Ghana) GHA | Ignatius Adukor |
| 3 | DF | (Malaysia) MAS | Kalaiharasan Letchumanan |
| 4 | MF | (Malaysia) MAS | Asnan Ahmad (captain) |
| 5 | DF | (Malaysia) MAS | Hafizudin Sulaiman |
| 6 | MF | (Malaysia) MAS | Saiful Hasnol |
| 7 | MF | (Malaysia) MAS | Azri Zulkiflee |
| 8 | FW | (Malaysia) MAS | Nor Farhan Muhammad |
| 10 | MF | (Malaysia) MAS | Hafizi Amiruddin |
| 11 | DF | (Malaysia) MAS | Irwan Syazmin |
| 12 | DF | (Malaysia) MAS | K. Reuben |
| 13 | DF | (Malaysia) MAS | Zairul Fitree Ishak |
| 14 | DF | (Malaysia) MAS | Zubair Kamarulzaman |
| 15 | DF | (South Korea) KOR | Lee Seung-woo |
| 16 | FW | (Malaysia) MAS | Zarul Aidiel |

| No. | Pos. | Nation | Player |
|---|---|---|---|
| 17 | MF | (Malaysia) MAS | Terence Marieselvam |
| 18 | GK | (Malaysia) MAS | Amin Faisal |
| 19 | MF | (Malaysia) MAS | Baqiuddin Shamsudin |
| 20 | FW | (Malaysia) MAS | Faiz Hanif |
| 21 | DF | (Malaysia) MAS | Rafiq Shah Zaim |
| 22 | GK | (Malaysia) MAS | Remezey Che Ros |
| 23 | DF | (Malaysia) MAS | Imran Azizi |
| 24 | MF | (Malaysia) MAS | Syed Sobri |
| 25 | DF | (Malaysia) MAS | Tuan Ahmad Muqris |
| 27 | DF | (Malaysia) MAS | Rafizi Hamdan |
| 28 | DF | (Malaysia) MAS | Talhah Rosli |
| 29 | DF | (Malaysia) MAS | Syafiq Azri |
| 30 | FW | (Malaysia) MAS | Badrul Amin Hamid |
| 33 | FW | (Argentina) ARG | Julián Bottaro |
| 35 | FW | (Nigeria) NGA | Akanni-Sunday Wasiu |

== Competitions ==
=== Malaysia Premier League ===
==== League table ====
| Pos | Team | Pld | W | D | L | GF | GA | GD | Pts | Qualification or relegation |
|---|---|---|---|---|---|---|---|---|---|---|
| 7 | Selangor II (Note: Johor Darul Ta'zim II, Perak II, Selangor II and Terengganu II cannot be promoted from Malaysia Premier League and play in Malaysia Cup as Johor Darul Ta'zim F.C., Perak FA, Selangor F.C. and Terengganu FC (their parent clubs) remain in Malaysia Super League and play in Malaysia Cup. Should the team be relegated to Malaysia Premier League or will not play in Malaysia Cup, Johor Darul Ta'zim II, Perak II, Selangor II and Terengganu II will have to drop to Malaysia M3 League or will play in Malaysia Cup.) | 11 | 4 | 1 | 6 | 17 | 23 | −6 | 13 | |
| 8 | Kelantan United | 11 | 4 | 0 | 7 | 13 | 19 | −6 | 12 | |
| 9 | UKM | 11 | 3 | 3 | 5 | 11 | 17 | −6 | 12 | Withrew Next Season |
| 10 | Sarawak United | 11 | 3 | 2 | 6 | 14 | 16 | −2 | 11 | |
| 11 | Negeri Sembilan | 11 | 3 | 2 | 6 | 12 | 20 | −8 | 11 | |

Updated to match(es) played on 31 October 2020. Source: MFL
Rules for classification: 1) Points; 2) Goal difference; 3) Number of goals scored.

== Statistics ==
As of match played 9 October 2020

=== Appearances and goals ===
| No. | Pos | Nat | Player | Total | | League | |
| No. | Pos | Nat | Player | Apps | Goals | Apps | Goals |
|---|---|---|---|---|---|---|---|
| 2 | DF | (Ghana) GHA | Ignatius Adukor | 7 | 0 | 7 | 0 |
| 3 | DF | (Malaysia) MAS | Kalaiharasan Letchumanan | 7 | 0 | 5+2 | 0 |
| 4 | MF | (Malaysia) MAS | Asnan Ahmad | 11 | 0 | 11 | 0 |
| 6 | MF | (Malaysia) MAS | Saiful Hasnol | 5 | 0 | 1+4 | 0 |
| 7 | MF | (Malaysia) MAS | Azri Zulkiflee | 9 | 0 | 7+2 | 0 |
| 10 | MF | (Malaysia) MAS | Hafizi Amiruddin | 9 | 1 | 7+2 | 1 |
| 11 | MF | (Malaysia) MAS | Irwan Syazmin | 4 | 0 | 3+1 | 0 |
| 12 | DF | (Malaysia) MAS | K. Reuben | 9 | 0 | 9 | 0 |
| 15 | DF | (South Korea) KOR | Lee Seong Woo | 11 | 1 | 10+1 | 1 |
| 16 | FW | (Malaysia) MAS | Zarul Aidiel | 1 | 0 | 0+1 | 0 |
| 17 | MF | (Malaysia) MAS | Terence Marieselvam | 3 | 0 | 1+2 | 0 |
| 19 | MF | (Malaysia) MAS | Baqiuddin Shamsudin | 11 | 3 | 8+3 | 3 |
| 20 | MF | (Malaysia) MAS | Faiz Hanif | 10 | 2 | 5+5 | 2 |
| 21 | DF | (Malaysia) MAS | Rafiq Shah | 5 | 0 | 0+5 | 0 |
| 22 | GK | (Malaysia) MAS | Remezey Che Ros | 11 | 0 | 11 | 0 |
| 24 | MF | (Malaysia) MAS | Syed Sobri | 9 | 0 | 5+4 | 0 |
| 27 | DF | (Malaysia) MAS | Rafizi Hamdan | 9 | 0 | 9 | 0 |
| 28 | DF | (Malaysia) MAS | Talhah Rosli | 2 | 0 | 0+2 | 0 |
| 29 | DF | (Malaysia) MAS | Syafiq Azri | 10 | 0 | 10 | 0 |
| 30 | FW | (Malaysia) MAS | Badrul Amin Hamid | 8 | 0 | 2+6 | 0 |
| 35 | FW | (Nigeria) NGA | Akanni-Sunday Wasiu | 8 | 4 | 7+1 | 4 |
Players who left UKM during the season:
| 9 | MF | (France) FRA | Kevin Osei | 2 | 0 | 2 | 0 |
| 26 | FW | (Liberia) LBR | Amadaiya Rennie | 1 | 0 | 1 | 0 |
