= Osman Yusoff =

Malaysian association football player

Personal information
- Full name: Osman bin Mohd Yusoff
- Date of birth: 17 March 1994 (age 32)
- Place of birth: Alor Setar, Malaysia
- Height: 1.81 m (5 ft 11 1/2 in)
- Position: Centre-back

Team information
- Current team: MP Kubang Pasu
- Number: 18

Youth career
- 2013: Harimau Muda B
- 2014–2015: Kedah Darul Aman
- 2015: Cardiff City

Senior career*
Years	Team	Apps	(Gls)
2013	Harimau Muda B	14	(0)
2014–2018	Kedah Darul Aman		
2018–2019	Negeri Sembilan		
2020	Felda United		
2021	Negeri Sembilan		
2022–2023	Kelantan		
2025–	MP Kubang Pasu		

International career
2010	Malaysia U16		
2014	Malaysia U22		
- * Club domestic league appearances and goals

Osman bin Mohd Yusoff (born 17 March 1994) is a Malaysian professional footballer who plays as a centre-back for Malaysia A2 Amateur League club MP Kubang Pasu.

== Club career ==
Osman is a graduate of the Kedah Darul Aman youth system where he played for under-21 team.

=== Negeri Sembilan ===
On 2 June 2018, Osman signed a contract with Negeri Sembilan.

On 15 December 2020, Osman joined Negeri Sembilan for a second stint.

== International career ==
Osman has represented Malaysia at under-16 and under-22 levels. He was a member of the under-16 squad at 2010 AFC U-16 Championship qualification.

== Career statistics ==
As of matches played 10 September 2021

Appearances and goals by club, season and competition
Club	Season	League			FA Cup		Malaysia Cup		Continental		Total	
Club	Season	Division	Apps	Goals	Apps	Goals	Apps	Goals	Apps	Goals	Apps	Goals
Kedah Darul Aman	2014	Malaysia Premier League	0	0	0	0	0	0	—		0	0
Kedah Darul Aman	2015	Malaysia Premier League	0	0	0	0	0	0	—		0	0
Kedah Darul Aman	2016	Malaysia Super League	3	0	1	0	2	0	—		6	0
Kedah Darul Aman	2017	Malaysia Super League	1	0	0	0	1	0	—		2	0
Kedah Darul Aman	2018	Malaysia Super League	0	0	0	0	0	0	—		0	0
Kedah Darul Aman	Total		4	0	1	0	3	0	—		0	0
Negeri Sembilan	2018	Malaysia Premier League	0	0	—		0	0	—		0	0
Negeri Sembilan	2019	Malaysia Premier League	0	0	—		0	0	—		0	0
Negeri Sembilan	Total		0	0	0	0	0	0	—		0	0
Felda United	2020	Malaysia Super League	3	0	—		0	0	—		3	0
Felda United	Total		3	0	0	0	0	0	—		3	0
Negeri Sembilan	2021	Malaysia Premier League	5	0	—		0	0	—		5	0
Negeri Sembilan	Total		5	0	0	0	0	0	—		5	0

== Honours ==
=== Club ===
Kedah Darul Aman

- Malaysia FA Cup: 2017
- Malaysia Cup: 2016
