= Alex Moraes =

Brazilian footballer (born 1988)

Personal information
- Full name: Alexandre de Moraes Gomes
- Date of birth: March 25, 1988 (age 38)
- Place of birth: Barão de Cocais, Brazil
- Height: 1.95 m (6 ft 5 in)
- Position: Centre back

Team information
- Current team: Negeri Sembilan
- Number: 3

Youth career
- 2002–2006: Roma Apucarana

Senior career*
Years	Team	Apps	(Gls)
2006–2010	Roma Apucarana	4	(0)
2007–2009	→ Juventude (loan)	6	(1)
2009–2010	→ Standard Liège (loan)	0	(0)
2010	Porto Alegre	0	(0)
2011	Nova Iguaçu	0	(0)
2011	Anápolis	0	(0)
2011	Paulista	0	(0)
2011–2012	Luverdense	1	(0)
2012–2017	São José		
2018	Pahang FA	3	(0)
2018–	Negeri Sembilan	9	(2)
- * Club domestic league appearances and goals as of 28 July 2018

Alexandre de Moraes Gomes or simply, Alex Moraes (born March 25, 1988), is a Brazilian footballer who plays as a centre back for Negeri Sembilan in the Malaysia Super League.

== Career ==
Moraes began his career with Roma Esporte Apucarana and joined in November 2007 on loan to Esporte Clube Juventude, here played between June 2009 only 6 games and scores one goal, before turned back to Roma Esporte Apucarana. On July 9, 2009 Roma Esporte Apucarana's 21-year-old center-back will play on loan for Standard Liège for a season, the young Brazilian will replace U.S. international Oguchi Onyewu, who has recently signed for AC Milan.

Not too long after signed for Pahang, the club decided to dropped him and brought in Francis Forkey Doe, the experiences foreign striker in Malaysia Super League to boost the club attacking option.

On May 14, 2018, Moraes joined Negeri Sembilan club.
