= Mohd Syahid Zaidon =

Malaysian footballer

Syahid Zaidon
Personal information
- Full name: Muhammad Syahid bin Zaidon
- Date of birth: 12 August 1990 (age 36)
- Place of birth: Bentong, Pahang, Malaysia
- Height: 1.76 m (5 ft 9 1/2 in)
- Position: Central midfielder

Team information
- Current team: PDRM
- Number: 24

Youth career
- 2006–2007: Malaysia U17

Senior career*
Years	Team	Apps	(Gls)
2007–2009	Harimau Muda	21	(1)
2010–2013	Harimau Muda A	19	(1)
2014–2017	Felda United	46	(2)
2018	Negeri Sembilan	6	(0)
2019–	PDRM	0	(0)

International career^{‡}
2008–2011	Malaysia U-21	7	(0)
2010–2013	Malaysia U-23	9	(0)
- * Club domestic league appearances and goals as of 27 February 2019 ‡ National team caps and goals as of 15 May 2014

Muhammad Syahid bin Zaidon (born 12 August 1990 in Bentong, Pahang) is a Malaysian footballer who plays for PDRM in Malaysia Premier League as a central midfielder.

In 2014, Syahid has agreed terms with Felda United after have been released from the Harimau Muda squad as he is overaged.

== Career statistics ==
=== Club ===
As of match played 27 June 2018.

Club	Season	League		Cup		League Cup		Continental		Total	
Club	Season	Apps	Goals	Apps	Goals	Apps	Goals	Apps	Goals	Apps	Goals
Felda United	2014	19	1	7	0	6	0	–		32	1
Felda United	2015	3	0	0	0	0	0	–		3	0
Felda United	2016	19	1	2	0	8	0	–		29	1
Felda United	2017	5	0	0	0	0	0	4	0	9	0
Felda United	Total	46	2	9	0	14	0	4	0	73	2
Negeri Sembilan	2018	6	0	0	0	0	0	–		6	0
Negeri Sembilan	Total	6	0	0	0	0	0	0	0	6	0
Career total		52	2	9	0	14	0	4	0	79	2
