= Saiful Amar Sudar =

Malaysian footballer

Personal information
- Full name: Saiful Amar bin Sudar
- Date of birth: 10 June 1982 (age 44)
- Place of birth: Selangor, Malaysia
- Height: 1.74 m (5 ft 9 in)
- Position: Goalkeeper

Youth career
- 2002: Kuala Lumpur U21

Senior career*
Years	Team	Apps	(Gls)
2003–2009	Kuala Lumpur	?	(0)
2009–2010	PKNS	?	(0)
2011	Selangor	9	(0)
2012–2013	Sarawak	16	(0)
2014	Kedah	6	(0)
2015	PDRM	5	(0)
2016	Perlis	6	(0)
2017–2018	Negeri Sembilan	5	(0)

International career
2005	Malaysia U23	9	(0)
- * Club domestic league appearances and goals

Saiful Amar bin Sudar (born 10 June 1982) is a Malaysian footballer who formerly plays as a goalkeeper.

== Club career ==
Saiful played for Sarawak for two seasons until the end of his contract in November 2013. Saiful has won the 2013 Malaysia Premier League during his time with Sarawak.

Saiful also has played for Selangor, PKNS and Kuala Lumpur, Kedah, PDRM, Perlis and Negeri Sembilan.

== International career ==
Saiful played for Malaysia national under 23 team at the 2005 Southeast Asian Games where Malaysia finished as bronze medalist. He also played in the 2005 Agribank Cup held in Vietnam.

== Coaching career ==
In 2023, Saiful work as goalkeeper coach for Kuala Lumpur City.

== Career statistics ==
=== Club ===
As of 10 July 2018

Club	Season	League		Cup		League Cup		Continental		Total	
Club	Season	Apps	Goals	Apps	Goals	Apps	Goals	Apps	Goals	Apps	Goals
Negeri Sembilan	2017	3	0	2	0	4	0	–	–	9	0
Negeri Sembilan	2018	2	0	0	0	0	0	–	–	2	0
Negeri Sembilan	Total	5	0	2	0	4	0	0	0	11	0
Career total		0	0	0	0	0	0	0	0	0	0
