= Shazlan Alias =

Malaysian footballer

Personal information
- Full name: Mohd Shazlan bin Alias
- Date of birth: 27 December 1989 (age 36)
- Place of birth: Terengganu, Malaysia
- Height: 1.70 m (5 ft 7 in)
- Position: Right back

Team information
- Current team: Melaka United
- Number: 4

Youth career
- 2006: Bukit Jalil Sports School

Senior career*
Years	Team	Apps	(Gls)
2006–2009	Harimau Muda		
2009–2010	Terengganu		
2010–2012	T–Team		
2012	Sime Darby	3	(0)
2013	T–Team		
2014–2015	Selangor		
2016–2017	Negeri Sembilan		
2018-2021	Melaka United	2	(0)

International career^{‡}
2009–2013	Malaysia U23	18	(1)
- * Club domestic league appearances and goals as of 28 July 2018 ‡ National team caps and goals as of 24 January 2017

Mohd Shazlan bin Alias (born 27 December 1989) is a Malaysian former professional footballer who played for Melaka United in the Malaysia Super League as a right back.

== Club career ==
A graduate of Bukit Jalil Sports School, Mohd Shazlan Alias was part of the Malaysian under-18 squad that was at that time under K. Rajagopal that competed at the ASEAN Football Championship Under-20 in Vietnam in July 2007. Despite intense competition with Mahali Jasuli for the right back position, Shazlan performances were outstanding enough to allow him to remain with the Harimau Muda squad that was at that time competing in the 2008 Malaysia Premier League.

Shazlan later played for his home state Terengganu for the 2009 edition of the Malaysia Super League but later moved to its feeder club T–Team after only one season to gain more first-team experience. While playing with T-Team, Shazlan was selected to represent Terengganu in SUKMA 2010 that was held in Malacca where he manage to help them win the gold medal for a third time in a row beating Selangor 1–0 in the final.

After two seasons with T-Team, Shazlan accepted an offer to play for Sime Darby. His combination with captain Es Lizuan, Fairuz Abdul Aziz and Muhd Arif Ismail was proven to be a rock in defence for Sime Darby as they led the club team in creating history by shocking everyone to reach the 2012 Malaysia FA Cup competition, playing in the final only to lose to Kelantan FA 1–0.

He returned to T-Team after the final playing for them for one season. Shazlan decided to join Selangor FA for the 2014 Malaysia Super League, winning the 2015 Malaysia Cup. He moved to Melaka for the MSL 2018 season. He had a hamstring injury in 2019 and retired from football in 2021.

== Post-football ==
Shazlan, known as Lan JJ, is married and owns and runs a hydrotherapy business in Terengganu with his wife.
