= Fauzan Fauzi =

Malaysian footballer

Personal information
- Full name: Muhammad Fauzan bin Mohd Fauzi
- Date of birth: 7 January 1995 (age 31)
- Place of birth: Seremban, Negeri Sembilan, Malaysia
- Height: 1.71 m (5 ft 7 in)
- Position: Right-back

Team information
- Current team: Bunga Raya F.C.
- Number: 5

Youth career
- 2016: Negeri Sembilan U21

Senior career*
Years	Team	Apps	(Gls)
2017–2018	Negeri Sembilan	24	(1)
2019	PDRM	16	(2)
2020–2021	Kuala Lumpur City	7	(0)
2021	→ Penang (loan)		
2022	Melaka United	8	(0)
2023–2024	Kelantan United	18	(0)
2024–2025	MPPD F.C.		

International career^{‡}
2017–2018	Malaysia U-23		
- * Club domestic league appearances and goals ‡ National team caps and goals as of 2 January 2018

Muhammad Fauzan bin Mohd Fauzi (born 7 January 1995) is a Malaysian professional footballer who plays as right-back.

== Club career ==
Born in Seremban, Negeri Sembilan, Fauzan began his football career playing for Negeri Sembilan U21 team in 2016 at the age of 20, before been promoted to the senior team.

== Career statistics ==
=== Club ===
As of 29 August 2021

Appearances and goals by club, season and competition
Club	Season	League			Cup		League Cup		Continental		Total	
Club	Season	Division	Apps	Goals	Apps	Goals	Apps	Goals	Apps	Goals	Apps	Goals
Negeri Sembilan	2017	Malaysia Premier League	11	1	4	0	3	0	–		18	1
Negeri Sembilan	2018	Malaysia Super League	13	0	0	0	5	0	–		18	0
Negeri Sembilan	Total		24	1	4	0	8	0	–		36	1
PDRM	2019	Malaysia Premier League	16	2	2	2	1	0	–		19	4
PDRM	Total		16	2	2	2	1	0	–		19	4
Kuala Lumpur City	2020	Malaysia Premier League	6	0	0	0	0	0	–		6	0
Kuala Lumpur City	2021	Malaysia Super League	1	0	0	0	0	0	–		1	0
Kuala Lumpur City	Total		7	0	0	0	0	0	–		7	0
Penang (loan)	2021	Malaysia Super League	2	0	0	0	2	0	–		4	0
Penang (loan)	Total		2	0	0	0	2	0	–		4	0
Melaka United	2022	Malaysia Super League	12	0	1	0	0	0	–		13	0
Melaka United	Total		12	0	1	0	0	0	–		13	0
Career Total			0	0	0	0	0	0	–	–	0	0

== International career ==
Fauzan was called up to the Malaysia U-23 for 2018 AFC U-23 Championship qualification in 2017.
