= Noor Hazrul Mustafa =

Malaysian footballer

Personal information
- Full name: Mohd Noor Hazrul bin Mohd Mustafa
- Date of birth: 11 October 1988 (age 38)
- Place of birth: Sungkai, Perak, Malaysia
- Height: 5 ft 6 in (1.68 m)
- Positions: Defender; midfielder

Team information
- Current team: BRM FC
- Number: 19

Youth career
- 2006–2007: Perak FA President's Cup

Senior career*
Years	Team	Apps	(Gls)
2008–2009	Perak	13	(57)
2010–2014	Perak	63	(6)
2015–2016	Kelantan	21	(2)
2017–2018	Negeri Sembilan	26	(0)
2021–	BRM FC	4	(0)

International career^{‡}
2014	Malaysia	1	(0)
- * Club domestic league appearances and goals as of 10 July 2018 ‡ National team caps and goals as of 24 January 2017

Mohd Noor Hazrul bin Mohd Mustafa (born 11 October 1988 in Perak) is a Malaysian professional footballer. Currently he plays for BRM FC. He started his career as a defender, but is mostly used as a midfielder.

== Career ==
He started his football career with his home state team, Perak FA. He represented Perak for the 2006 Sukma Games in Kedah. He was also part of the Malaysia team that gave a good account of themselves in the Champions Youth Cup 2007 tournament, which was held in Kuala Lumpur. He was promoted to the senior Perak FA team for the 2008 season.

Noor Hazrul made his first team debut on 18 November 2007, coming on as a substitute in a match against DPMM FC. He made his first start against UPB-MyTeam FC on 21 November 2007. He scored his first ever senior goal on 12 January 2008 against title rivals Kedah FA. However, Perak FA lost that match 2–5. After four years playing for Perak FA, he decided to join the east coast side, Kelantan FA and quickly gained the attention of The Red Warriors fan after scoring a goal in his debut for the team.

== Career statistics ==
=== Club ===
As of 10 July 2018

Club performance		League		Cup		League Cup		Continental		Total	
Season	Club	Apps	Goals	Apps	Goals	Apps	Goals	Apps	Goals	Apps	Goals
2009	Perak	13	2					–	–		
Total		13	2								
2010	Perlis	9	4					–	–		
Total		9	4								
2011	Perak	22	3					–	–		
2012	Perak	10	0	-	-	-	-	-	-		
2013	Perak	0	1	-	-	-	-	-	-		
2014	Perak	0	0	-	-	-	-	-	-		
Total			4					–	–		
2015	Kelantan	11	2	3	0	4	0	–	–	18	2
2016	Kelantan	10	0	1	0	2	0	–	–	13	0
Total		21	2	4	0	6	0	–	–	31	2
2017	Negeri Sembilan	17	0	5	0	3	0	–	–	25	0
2018	Negeri Sembilan	9	0	1	0	0	0	–	–	10	0
Total		26	0	6	0	3	0	–	–	35	0
Career Total								–	–		
