= Ferris Danial =

Malaysian professional footballer

Personal information
- Full name: Muhammad Ferris Danial bin Mat Nasir
- Date of birth: 21 August 1992 (age 34)
- Place of birth: Kelantan, Malaysia
- Height: 1.68 m (5 ft 6 in)
- Position: Forward

Youth career
- 2009–2010: Kelantan U-21

Senior career*
Years	Team	Apps	(Gls)
2010	Harimau Muda B	12	(2)
2011–2014	Harimau Muda A	11	(0)
2015	Felda United	2	(0)
2016	→ Melaka United (loan)		
2017	Terengganu		
2018–2019	Negeri Sembilan	16	(1)
2020	Melaka United	9	(1)
2021	Negeri Sembilan	11	(0)
2022	Perak		
2023–2024	Immigration		
2024–2025	PIB		

International career^{‡}
2011–2015	Malaysia U-23		
- * Club domestic league appearances and goals ‡ National team caps and goals as of 13 July 2016

Muhammad Ferris Danial Bin Mat Nasir (born 21 August 1992) is a Malaysian professional footballer who plays as a forward.

== Club career ==
=== Harimau Muda ===
He start his senior career with Harimau Muda from 2010 to 2014 under coach Ong Kim Swee.

=== Felda United ===
On 12 December 2014, Ferris was announced as a Felda United new signing, after being released from Harimau Muda.

Initially Ferris was in a contract dispute between his hometown team Kelantan and Felda United, and was only resolved in March 2015 by mutual agreement between both teams. This caused him to miss the first three months of the season, finally making his debut with Felda United, as a substitute, on 8 March 2015 against LionsXII in a league match.

=== Terengganu ===
In November 2016, Ferris left Felda United to signed with Terengganu.

== Career statistics ==
=== Club statistics ===
As of 10 July 2018

Club performance			League		Cup		League Cup		Continental		Total	
Season	Club	League	Apps	Goals	Apps	Goals	Apps	Goals	Apps	Goals	Apps	Goals
2011	Harimau Muda	Malaysia Super League	12	2	0	0	0	0	-		12	2
Total			12	2	0	0	0	0	-		12	2
2012	Harimau Muda	S.League	11	0	0	0	0	0	-		11	0
Total			11	0	0	0	0	0	-		11	0
2016	Felda United	Malaysia Super League	2	0	0	0	0	0	-		2	0
Total			2	0	0	0	0	0	-		2	0
2016	Melaka United	Malaysia Premier League	4	0	0	0	4	1	-		8	1
Total			4	0	0	0	4	1	-		8	1
2017	Terengganu	Malaysia Premier League	18	1	5	0	6	0	-		29	1
Total			18	1	5	0	6	0	-		29	1
2018	Negeri Sembilan	Malaysia Super League	12	1	1	0	0	0	-		13	1
Total			12	1	1	0	0	0	-		13	1
Career total			0	0	0	0	0	0	-	-	0	0

== Honours ==
=== Club ===
Melaka United

- Malaysia Premier League: 2016
