= Mohd Fauzan Dzulkifli =

Malaysian footballer

Fauzan Dzulkifli
Personal information
- Full name: Mohd Fauzan bin Dzulkifli
- Date of birth: 13 October 1987 (age 39)
- Place of birth: Tanjung Karang, Malaysia
- Height: 1.82 m (5 ft 11 1/2 in)
- Position: Midfielder

Team information
- Current team: Sarawak FA
- Number: 13

Youth career
- 2005–2006: Selangor

Senior career*
Years	Team	Apps	(Gls)
2007–2010	Selangor	20	(0)
2011–2014	PKNS	96	(21)
2015–2016	Felda United	8	(0)
2016	Penang	15	(0)
2017	PKNS	12	(0)
2018	Negeri Sembilan	14	(1)
2019	Selangor United	0	(0)
2020-	Sarawak FA	0	(0)

International career^{‡}
2013	Malaysia	0	(0)
- * Club domestic league appearances and goals as of 21 December 2020 ‡ National team caps and goals as of 29 December 2015

Mohd Fauzan bin Dzulkifli (born 13 October 1987) is a former Malaysian footballer who in Malaysia Premier League as a midfielder. Now he full retired from career and involve self in insurance financial agent
