= Thomas Koroma =

Sierra Leonean footballer

Personal information
- Birth name: Thomas Sebora Koroma
- Date of birth: 1 February 1993 (age 33)
- Place of birth: Sierra Leone
- Height: 1.80 m (5 ft 11 in)
- Position: Forward

Team information
- Current team: Negeri Sembilan
- Number: 10

Senior career*
Years	Team	Apps	(Gls)
2016–2018	TP-47	57	(9)
2019–	Negeri Sembilan	3	(0)

International career^{‡}
2017–	Sierra Leone	1	(0)
- * Club domestic league appearances and goals as of 3 March 2019 ‡ National team caps and goals as of 17 March 2018

Thomas Sebora Koroma (born 10 January 1993) is a Sierra Leonean footballer who plays as forward for Negeri Sembilan.
