= Nemanja Vidić (footballer, born 1989) =

Serbian footballer

Personal information
- Full name: Nemanja Vidić
- Date of birth: 6 August 1989 (age 37)
- Place of birth: Belgrade, SFR Yugoslavia
- Height: 1.89 m (6 ft 2 in)
- Positions: Defensive midfielder; centre-back

Team information
- Current team: Grafičar
- Number: 44

Senior career*
Years	Team	Apps	(Gls)
2007–2010	Zemun	53	(3)
2010–2011	FC HIT	7	(0)
2011–2014	Javor Ivanjica	74	(4)
2014–2015	Radnički Kragujevac	9	(0)
2015–2016	Rad	17	(1)
2016	Novi Pazar	12	(0)
2016-2017	Kyzylzhar	0	(0)
2017	Negeri Sembilan	0	(0)
2018	Budućnost Dobanovci	16	(0)
2019–2020	Inđija	38	(1)
2020–2021	Sichuan Jiuniu	39	(2)
2022	Nanjing City	24	(0)
2023	Heilongjiang Ice City	25	(0)
2024	Inđija	3	(0)
2024–2025	Voždovac	32	(1)
2025-	Grafičar	9	(0)
- * Club domestic league appearances and goals as of 14 May 2026

Nemanja Vidić (Serbian Cyrillic: Немања Видић, pronounced [němaɲa ʋǐːditɕ]; born 6 August 1989) is a Serbian professional footballer who plays for Serbian First League club Grafičar as a defensive midfielder.

== Club career ==
In 2017, he played in Malaysia for Negeri Sembilan.

On 29 July 2020, Vidić transferred to China League One club Sichuan Jiuniu.

On 15 April 2022, Vidić transferred to China League One club Nanjing City.

On 19 April 2023, Vidić transferred to China League One club Heilongjiang Ice City.

== Career statistics ==
As of match played 17 May 2025.

Appearances and goals by club, season and competition
Club	Season	League			National Cup		Continental		Other		Total	
Club	Season	Division	Apps	Goals	Apps	Goals	Apps	Goals	Apps	Goals	Apps	Goals
Zemun	2007–08	Serbian First League	0	0	0	0	—		—		0	0
Zemun	2008–09	Serbian League	21	1	0	0	—		—		14	0
Zemun	2009–10	Serbian First League	20	2	0	0	—		—		14	0
Zemun	2010–11	Serbian First League	12	0	0	0	—		—		14	0
Zemun	Total		53	3	0	0	—		—		53	3
HIT Gorica	2010–11	Slovenian PrvaLiga	7	0	0	0	—		—		7	0
Javor Ivanjica	2011–12	Serbian SuperLiga	24	1	2	0	—		—		26	1
Javor Ivanjica	2012–13	Serbian SuperLiga	27	2	5	0	—		—		32	2
Javor Ivanjica	2013–14	Serbian SuperLiga	23	1	0	0	—		—		23	1
Javor Ivanjica	Total		74	4	7	0	—		—		81	4
Radnički 1923	2014–15	Serbian SuperLiga	9	0	1	0	—		—		10	0
Rad	2015–16	Serbian SuperLiga	17	1	1	0	—		—		18	1
Novi Pazar	2015–16	Serbian SuperLiga	12	0	0	0	—		—		12	0
Kyzylzhar	2017	Kazakhstan First Division	0	0	0	0	—		—		0	0
Negeri Sembilan	2017	Malaysia Premier League	0	0	6	0	—		—		6	0
Budućnost Dobanovci	2018–19	Serbian First League	16	0	0	0	—		—		16	0
Inđija	2018–19	Serbian First League	11	0	0	0	—		2 (Note: Appearances in Promotion play-off)	0	13	0
Inđija	2019–20	Serbian SuperLiga	27	1	3	0	—		—		30	1
Inđija	Total		38	1	3	0	—		2	0	43	1
Sichuan Jiuniu	2020	China League One	12	0	—		—		—		12	0
Sichuan Jiuniu	2021	China League One	27	2	4	0	—		—		31	2
Sichuan Jiuniu	Total		39	2	4	0	—		—		43	2
Nanjing City	2022	China League One	24	0	1	0	—		—		25	0
Heilongjiang Ice City	2023	China League One	25	0	1	0	—		—		26	0
Inđija	2023–24	Serbian First League	3	0	—		—		1	0	4	0
Voždovac	2024–25	Serbian First League	32	1	0	0	—		—		32	1
Career total			349	12	24	0	0	0	3	0	376	11
