= Akanni-Sunday Wasiu =

Nigerian footballer

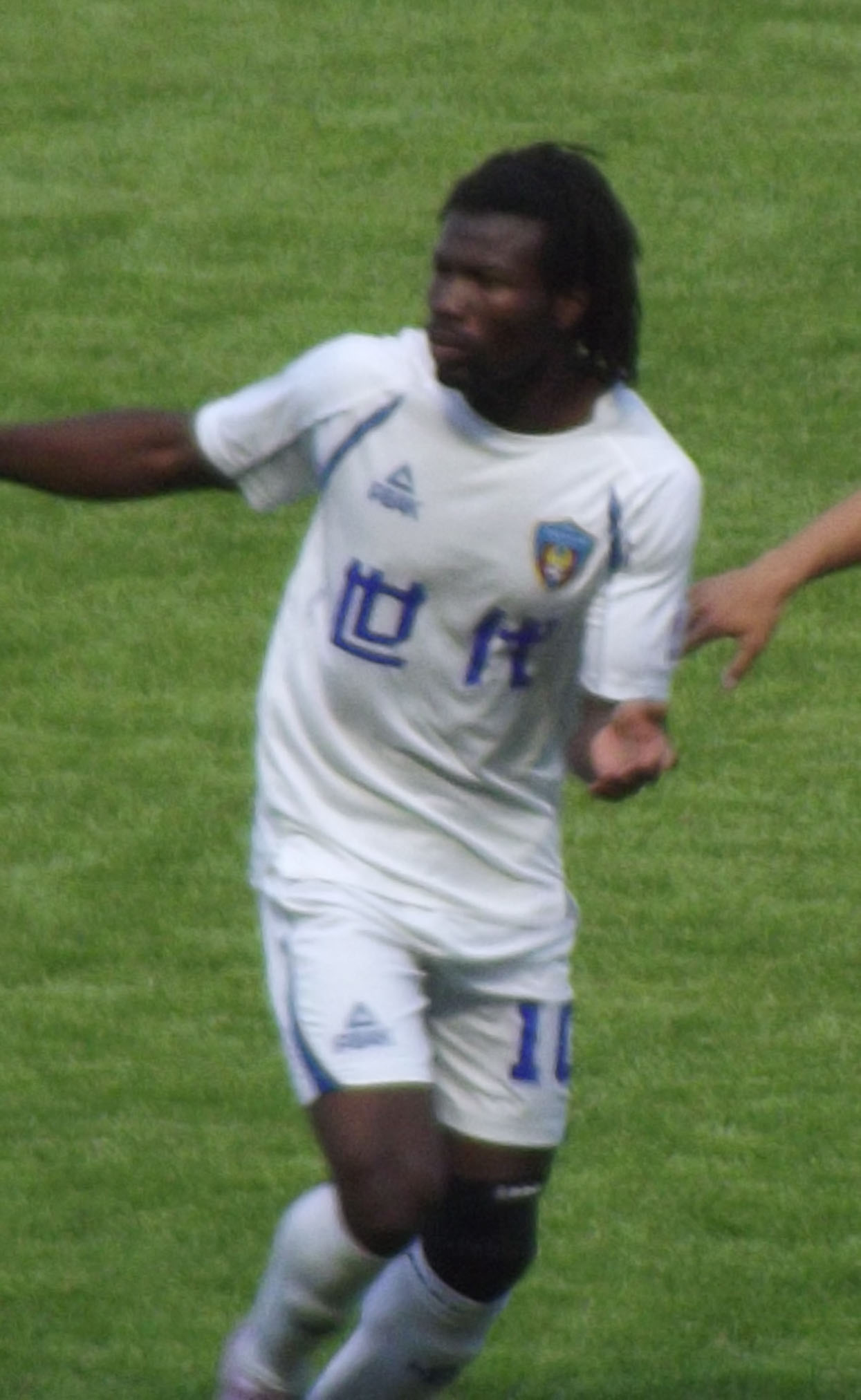

Personal information
- Full name: Akanni-Sunday Wasiu
- Date of birth: 18 March 1984 (age 42)
- Place of birth: Nigeria
- Height: 1.88 m (6 ft 2 in)
- Position: Forward

Youth career
- 2001–2003: Odyssey United

Senior career*
Years	Team	Apps	(Gls)
2004–2005	Szczakowianka Jaworzno	15	(1)
2006–2007	Vilnius	27	(3)
2007–2008	St Albans City	13	(3)
2008–2009	Colchester United	15	(2)
2009	→ Luton Town (loan)	5	(1)
2009–2010	Floriana	13	(3)
2010	Changsha Ginde	28	(3)
2011	Shenyang Dongjin	21	(6)
2012	Floriana	10	(4)
2014	Whitehawk		
2015	Cần Thơ	15	(3)
2016	Long An	9	(4)
2017	UiTM	21	(19)
2018	Terengganu	2	(0)
2018–2019	Terengganu II	15	(10)
2020	UKM	7	(5)
- * Club domestic league appearances and goals

Akanni-Sunday Wasiu (born 18 March 1984) is a Nigerian former professional footballer who played as a forward.

He played for clubs in Poland, Lithuania, England, Malta, China, Vietnam and Malaysia in his career.

== Club career ==
Sunday began his career in Poland with Szczakowianka Jaworzno, where he made 15 appearances, scoring once, before moving to Lithuania to play for FC Vilnius in 2006. During his time in Lithuania, he made 27 appearances, scoring 3 goal, before deciding to try his luck in England in 2007, signing for non-league St Albans City. He impressed at Clarence Park, bagging 3 goals in 13 appearances before pitching up on trial with Colchester United on trial during the summer of 2008, where he eventually earned himself a one-year deal. Akanni-Sunday Wasiu joined Luton Town on a one-month loan in mid-January 2009, having been a long-term target for Hatters boss Mick Harford. He scored once in five games for Luton before his loan deal expired.

After the 2008–09 season, Wasiu was released by Colchester after failing to make an impression on the first team.

Sunday joined Floriana on 28 August 2009; his debut came the following day in a 0–6 loss against rivals Valletta. His second appearance for the club was a more pleasant experience, as he netted his first goal in the 1–1 draw against Tarxien. The powerful striker fast became a fan favourite at the club and was voted as the Man Of the Match on three occasions by the Maltese journalists. In 13 matches with the Greens' Wasiu netted no less than 7 goals.

For the 2010 season, Wasiu joined Chinese side Changsha Ginde before moving to Shenyang Dongjin in 2011. In 2012, he returned to Floriana.

In September 2014, he returned to England to play for Whitehawk.

=== UITM ===
In December 2016, Sunday signed a one-year contract with Malaysia Premier League club UITM. There, he scored a total of 20 league and nine cup goals.

=== Terengganu ===
On 7 December 2017, Wasiu moved to fellow Malaysian top-division side Terengganu.

=== UKM ===
After two seasons with Malaysia Premier League club Terengganu II, Sunday signed with UKM.
