= Flávio Beck Júnior =

Brazilian professional footballer (born 1987)

Flávio Beck
Personal information
- Full name: Flávio Beck Júnior
- Date of birth: 14 March 1987 (age 39)
- Place of birth: Augusto Pestana, Brazil
- Height: 1.79 m (5 ft 10 in)
- Position: Midfielder

Youth career
- Grêmio
- Internacional
- Santo Ângelo
- Assis Chateaubriand

Senior career*
Years	Team	Apps	(Gls)
2006–2007	Solin	30	(16)
2007	Energie Cottbus	9	(3)
2007–2008	Flamurtari Vlorë	20	(8)
2009	Široki Brijeg	11	(5)
2009	Flamurtari Vlorë	15	(9)
2010	Maribor	11	(3)
2010–2011	Bargh Shiraz	9	(6)
2011–2013	Budućnost Podgorica	30	(11)
2013–2014	Inter Baku	14	(6)
2014–2015	Budućnost Podgorica	30	(8)
2015–2016	Lovćen	22	(7)
2016–2017	Borneo Samarinda	30	(13)
2018	Negeri Sembilan	18	(13)
2019	Kelantan	10	(4)
2019	Bhayangkara	16	(5)
2019	Semen Padang	17	(12)
2020–2021	PSIS Semarang	38	(7)
2021	→ Solin (loan)	38	(14)
2021	Petrovac		
2021	Novigrad	12	(4)
2022	PSIS Semarang	13	(5)
Total		275	(159)
- * Club domestic league appearances and goals

Flávio Beck Júnior (born 14 March 1987) is a Brazilian professional footballer who plays as a midfielder.

== Career ==
After playing in Brazil during his youth career, he came to Croatia in 2006 starting his senior career at a lower league Solin. After a short spell with German side Energie Cottbus he signed with Albanian Superliga side Flamurtari. In the second half of the 2008–09 season he played with Široki Brijeg in the Bosnian Premier League. Afterwards, he had another spell with Flamurtari before joining Maribor in the Slovenian PrvaLiga. During the season 2010–11 he played with Bargh Shiraz in the Azadegan League, the Iranian second level, before returning to Europe in the summer of 2011 to sign with Montenegrin top league side Bodućnost Podgorica.

In June 2013, Beck signed for Azerbaijan Premier League side Inter Baku. After only four league games for the club Beck was told he could leave the club in December 2013. However Beck was still being left in the reserves come April after a disagreement between the club's manager, Kakhaber Tskhadadze, and Becks agent. At the end of July 2014, Beck re-signed for Bodućnost Podgorica. In early September 2015 he signed with another Montenegrin top-flight club, Lovćen.

On 15 January 2019, Beck signed a one-year contract with Malaysia Premier League side Kelantan.

== Personal life ==
In 2013, he became a Croatian citizen.

== Career statistics ==
Appearances and goals by club, season and competition
Club	Season	League			National cup		League cup		Continental		Total	
Club	Season	Division	Apps	Goals	Apps	Goals	Apps	Goals	Apps	Goals	Apps	Goals
Kelantan	2019	Malaysia Premier League	10	4	1	0	0	0	–		11	4
Bhayangkara	2019	Liga 1	16	5	0	0	0	0	–		16	5
Semen Padang	2019	Liga 1	17	4	0	0	0	0	–		17	4
PSIS Semarang	2020	Liga 1	2	0	0	0	0	0	–		2	0
PSIS Semarang	2021–22	Liga 1	13	0	0	0	0	0	–		13	0
PSIS Semarang	Total		15	0	0	0	0	0	0	0	15	0
Solin (loan)	2021	2. HNL	4	0	0	0	0	0	–		4	0
Career total			62	13	1	0	0	0	0	0	63	13

== Honours ==
Maribor

- Slovenian Cup: 2009–10

Budućnost Podgorica

- 1. CFL: 2011–12
- Montenegrin Cup: 2012–13
