= Izuan Salahuddin =

Malaysian footballer (born 1991)

Personal information
- Full name: Muhammad Izuan Bin Salahuddin
- Date of birth: 31 October 1991 (age 35)
- Place of birth: Kota Bharu, Kelantan, Malaysia
- Height: 1.68 m (5 ft 6 in)
- Position: Left winger

Youth career
- 2009–2010: Kelantan President's Cup

Senior career*
| Years | Team | Apps | (Gls) |
| 2010–2013 | Kelantan | 26 | (3) |
| 2012 | → Harimau Muda A (loan) | 9 | (1) |
| 2014 | Sime Darby | 12 | (2) |
| 2015 | Sabah | 14 | (4) |
| 2016 | PDRM | 7 | (2) |
| 2016 | DRB-Hicom | 5 | (1) |
| 2017–2020 | Negeri Sembilan | 19 | (1) |

International career^{‡}
| 2011–2012 | Malaysia U-23 | 1 | (1) |
- * Club domestic league appearances and goals as of February 8, 2018 ‡ National team caps and goals as of June 16, 2016

Muhammad Izuan Bin Salahuddin (born 31 October 1991) is a Malaysian footballer who plays as a winger.

== Club career ==
Izuan started his career with Kelantan's President Cup Team in year 2009 for two years. Then, he was promoted into senior team by Kelantan coach, B. Sathianathan in the 2011 season.

On the next season, he was loaned to Harimau Muda A to competing in the S. League. However, he failed to enter first team squad.

For the 2013 season, he was recalled by Bojan Hodak for Kelantan's senior team.

He was released by Kelantan in 2014 and joined Sime Darby.

In 2015, he joined Sabah competing in the 2015 Malaysia Premier League.

After a season with Sabah in Malaysia Premier League, he moved to the upper league club, PDRM for 2016 Malaysia Super League.
