= L. Kalaiharasan =

Malaysian footballer

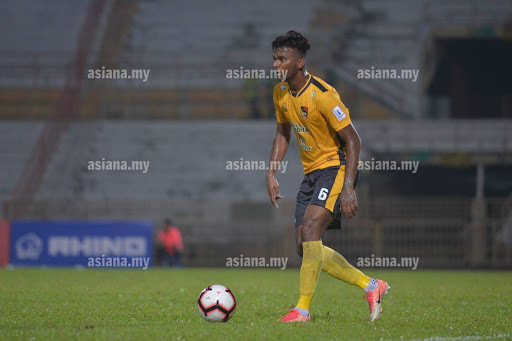

Personal information
- Full name: Kalaiharasan a/l Letchumanan
- Date of birth: 17 March 1996 (age 30)
- Place of birth: Negeri Sembilan, Malaysia
- Height: 1.85 m (6 ft 1 in)
- Position: Defender

Team information
- Current team: Sarawak United
- Number: 14

Youth career
- Negeri Sembilan

Senior career*
Years	Team	Apps	(Gls)
2018–2019	Negeri Sembilan	6	(0)
2020	UKM	7	(0)
2021	PDRM	19	(0)
2022–	Sarawak United	6	(0)

International career^{‡}
2017	Malaysia U22		
- * Club domestic league appearances and goals as of 02:23, 11 August 2021 (UTC) ‡ National team caps and goals as of 02:23, 28 May 2018 (UTC)

Kalaiharasan a/l Letchumanan (born 17 March 1996) is a Malaysian professional footballer who plays as a defender for Malaysia Super League club Sarawak United.

== Career ==
=== Club ===
Kalaiharasan began with Negeri Sembilan. He was moved into the club's senior team for the 2018 Malaysia Super League. His professional debut arrived on 3 February in the Super League, he played the full ninety minutes of a 1–0 loss to PKNP.

=== International ===
In June 2017, Kalaiharasan was called up by the Malaysia U22s for AFC qualification in Thailand.

== Career statistics ==
As of 28 May 2018.

Club statistics
Club	Season	League			Cup (Note: Includes the FA Cup)		League Cup (Note: Includes the Malaysia Cup)		Continental		Other		Total	
Club	Season	Division	Apps	Goals	Apps	Goals	Apps	Goals	Apps	Goals	Apps	Goals	Apps	Goals
Negeri Sembilan	2018	Super League	6	0	0	0	0	0	—		0	0	6	0
Career total			6	0	0	0	0	0	—		0	0	6	0
