= Shahrul Igwan =

Malaysian footballer

Personal information
- Full name: Shahrul Igwan bin Samsudin
- Date of birth: 17 May 1994 (age 32)
- Place of birth: Kedah, Malaysia
- Height: 1.74 m (5 ft 9 in)
- Position: Midfielder

Youth career
- 2008–2011: Bukit Jalil Sports School
- 2012–2014: Harimau Muda B
- 2014–2015: Harimau Muda A

Senior career*
Years	Team	Apps	(Gls)
2016–2017	Negeri Sembilan	16	(0)
2018	Selangor	6	(0)
2019	Kedah	0	(0)
2020	UiTM FC	4	(0)
2021	PDRM	9	(0)
2022–2023	Kelantan	9	(0)

International career^{‡}
2008–2010	Malaysia U-16	25	(4)
2011–2013	Malaysia U-19	18	(2)
2014–2015	Malaysia U-21	9	(1)
2015–2017	Malaysia U-23	4	(0)
- * Club domestic league appearances and goals as of 7 August 2021 ‡ National team caps and goals as of 21 December 2017

Shahrul Igwan bin Samsudin (born 17 May 1994) is a Malaysian footballer for Kelantan. He primarily plays as a defensive midfielder and as an attacking midfielder.

== Club career ==
=== Early year ===
Born in Alor Setar, Kedah, Shahrul joined the Bukit Jalil Sports School at the age of 14, and been promoted to Harimau Muda team at the age 18. His career has started with Kedah under 12 in 2004 represented the State in numerous tournament.

When the Harimau Muda squad played in the Singapore league (2014, 2015), Shahrul was a key player for the squad, making 42 appearances and scoring four goals.

=== Negeri Sembilan ===
After Harimau Muda team been dissolved in 2015, Shahrul signed two-years contract with his hometown side Negeri Sembilan.

=== Selangor ===
On 4 December 2017, Shahrul signed a one-year contract with Malaysia Super League club Selangor on a free transfer.

Kedah Shahrul joined his homestate Kedah in 2019 . He is part of Kedah FA Cup Champion 2019, 1st runner up Malaysia Cup and Unity Shield Champion 2019.

UiTM

Following year Shahrul signed a one-year contract with UiTM FC

== International career ==
Shahrul played for various Malaysian national youth teams, such as the under-16 and under-19 teams. With the under-16 team, he was a regular in the team making 25 appearances and scoring four goals. In 2009, Shahrul was called up to the Malaysia U-16 for 2010 AFC U-16 Championship qualification.

== Career statistics ==
=== Club ===
As of 16 September 2018

Club	Season	League			Cup		League Cup		Continental		Total	
Club	Season	Division	Apps	Goals	Apps	Goals	Apps	Goals	Apps	Goals	Apps	Goals
Selangor	2018	Malaysia Super League	6	0	2	0	4	0	—		12	0
Selangor	Total		6	0	2	0	4	0	0	0	12	0
Career total			6	0	2	0	4	0	0	0	12	0

== Honours ==
=== Club ===
Kedah

- Malaysia FA Cup: 2019
