= Faizal Abu Bakar =

Malaysian footballer

Personal information
- Full name: Mohd Faizal bin Abu Bakar
- Date of birth: 20 September 1990 (age 36)
- Place of birth: Kuala Nerang, Malaysia
- Height: 1.70 m (5 ft 7 in)
- Position: Midfielder

Team information
- Current team: Kuala Perlis Titans F.C. (head coach)

Youth career
- 2008: Kedah President Cup

Senior career*
Years	Team	Apps	(Gls)
2008–2014	Kedah		
2015	PDRM	13	(1)
2016	Kelantan	4	(0)
2017–2018	Negeri Sembilan	22	(0)
2019	Melaka United		

International career^{‡}
2010–2011	Malaysia U-23	11	(0)
2010–2011	Malaysia	2	(0)

Managerial career
- 2025–: Kuala Perlis Titans
Medal record
Men's Football
Representing Malaysia
AFF Championship
Winner	2010
- * Club domestic league appearances and goals ‡ National team caps and goals as of 27 January 2016

Mohd Faizal bin Abu Bakar (born 20 September 1990 in Kuala Nerang, Kedah) is a former Malaysian professional footballer who played as a midfielder. He is known as Sepet among teammates and fans.

== Club career ==
Born in Kuala Nerang, Kedah, Faizal is a product from Kedah President Cup squad, a youth team of Kedah FA. He has been promoted to the first team by Azraai Khor. Faizal made his debut in a Malaysia Cup group stage on 15 July 2008 where Kedah beat Sabah 5–1. He played more than 120 matches and scored 25 goals in all competition for Kedah.

In 2015, Faizal left Kedah and signed with PDRM. He made 13 league appearances and scored 1 goal. In 2016, Faizal signed with Kelantan. He only made 4 league appearances and left the team for Malaysia Premier League side Negeri Sembilan. He last played for Melaka United in 2019.

== International career ==
In November 2010, Faizal was called up to the Malaysia national team by coach K. Rajagopal for the 2010 AFF Suzuki Cup. He was in the Malaysia team that won the Suzuki Cup title for the first time in their history, although never made any appearance. In February 2010, he received his first appearance in a friendly match against Yemen. He was also playing for Malaysia U-23. He was in the squad that competed in the 2010 Asian Games. He was also in the team that competes for the 2012 Olympic Qualification preliminary round against Pakistan, coming on as a substitute in injury time in the second leg on 9 March 2011.

== Career statistics ==
=== Club ===
Club	Season	League		Cup		League Cup		Others		Total	
Club	Season	Apps	Goals	Apps	Goals	Apps	Goals	Apps	Goals	Apps	Goals
Kedah	2007–08	—		—			0	—			0
Kedah	2009		6		0		3	3 (Note: Appearances in 2008 AFC Cup.)	0		9
Kedah	2010	20	4	5	1	7	1	—		31	6
Kedah	2011	20	2	0	0	1	1	—		21	3
Kedah	2012	22	2	3	0	3	0	2 (Note: Appearances in 2012 Malaysia Super League play-off.)	0	30	2
Kedah	2013	17	2	1	0	2	0	—		20	2
Kedah	2014	18	3	2	0	1	0	—		21	3
Total			19		1		5	5	0		25
PDRM	2015	13	1	0	0	3	0	—		16	1
Total		13	1	0	0	3	0	—		16	1
Kelantan	2016	4	0	0	0	2	0	—		6	0
Total		4	0	0	0	2	0	—		6	0
Negeri Sembilan	2017	14	0	6	0	4	0	—		24	0
Negeri Sembilan	2018	10	0	1	0	—		—		11	0
Total		24	0	7	0	4	0	—		35	0
Melaka United	2019	0	0	0	0	5	0	—		5	0
Total		0	0	0	0	5	0	—		5	0
Career total											

== Honours ==
=== Kedah ===
- Malaysia Cup: 2008

=== International ===
- AFF Suzuki Cup: 2010
