= Nasriq Baharom =

Malaysian footballer (born 1987)

Personal information
- Full name: Mohd Nasriq Bin Baharom
- Date of birth: 8 February 1987 (age 39)
- Place of birth: Kuala Selangor, Selangor, Malaysia
- Height: 1.70 m (5 ft 7 in)
- Position: Defender

Team information
- Current team: Immigration
- Number: 6

Youth career
- 2000–2004: Bukit Jalil Sports School
- 2005–2007: Selangor President's Cup Team

Senior career*
Years	Team	Apps	(Gls)
2008–2013	Selangor	69	(3)
2014–2015	Felda United	21	(0)
2016–2018	Negeri Sembilan	42	(0)
2019	Perlis Northern Lions		
2019	Petaling Jaya City		
2020–	Immigration		

International career^{‡}
2008–2011	Malaysia U-23	31	(3)
2009–2011	Malaysia	4	(0)
Medal record
Men's football
Representing Malaysia
Malaysia U23
SEA Games
First place	2009 Vientiane
- * Club domestic league appearances and goals ‡ National team caps and goals as of January 24, 2017

Mohd Nasriq Bin Baharom (born 8 February 1987) is a Malaysian professional footballer who plays as a defender for Malaysia Super League club Immigration.

Nasriq was a member of the Malaysia national team and a member of the 2009 SEA Games gold winning squad.
