= Bruno Suzuki =

Brazilian footballer (born 1990)

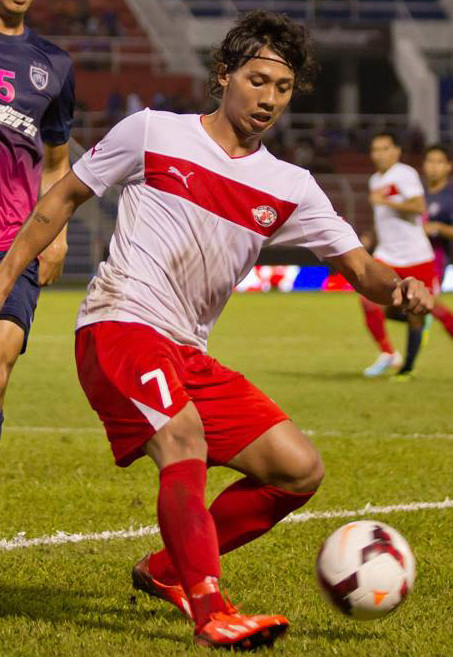
- Bruno Suzuki for Home United in a friendly match against JDT in 2014

Personal information
- Full name: Bruno Junichi Suzuki Castanheira
- Date of birth: 20 May 1990 (age 36)
- Place of birth: Castanhal, Pará, Brazil
- Height: 1.75 m (5 ft 9 in)
- Position: Forward

Team information
- Current team: Penang
- Number: 10

Youth career
- 2006–2008: Gamba Osaka

Senior career*
Years	Team	Apps	(Gls)
2009–2012	Albirex Niigata	0	(0)
2009	→ Machida Zelvia (loan)	3	(0)
2010–2011	→ Albirex Niigata (S) (loan)	48	(16)
2013	Albirex Niigata (S)	27	(6)
2014	Home United	25	(8)
2015	Geylang International	25	(12)
2016	FC Gifu	11	(3)
2017	Negeri Sembilan	19	(11)
2018–2020	Terengganu II	24	(11)
2018–2020	→ Terengganu (loan)	9	(0)
2021–2022	PDRM	10	(7)
2022	Bangkok	12	(4)
2023–2025	PDRM	28	(11)
2025–	Penang	10	(0)
- * Club domestic league appearances and goals as of 3 May 2026

Bruno Junichi Suzuki Castanheira (born 20 May 1990), commonly referred to as Bruno Suzuki (鈴木 ブルーノ) or Bruno Castanheira, is a Brazilian footballer who plays for Malaysia Football League club Penang.

== Club career ==
=== Beginnings in Japan and Singapore loan ===
Bruno was sent out on loan to the Japan Football League club, Machida Zelvia before returning and being sent out on loan again, this time with S.League club, Albirex Niigata Singapore on loan from the parent club in Japan. He made his debut in the 26 July 2010 clash against Balestier Khalsa, in the 1–1 draw. He scored 3 goals in the 2011 Singapore League Cup including a double in the quarter-finals against Geylang United. Bruno helped Albirex Niigata Singapore to lift the Singapore League Cup.

In 2012, Bruno returned to his parent club, Albirex Niigata. He played a couple of matches during pre-season and was given the squad number 27. However, he found first-team opportunities hard to come by, only being named on the substitute's bench once.

=== Albirex Niigata Singapore ===
Bruno then signed with Albirex Niigata Singapore on a permanent basis for the 2013 S.League season upon expiration of his contract. The official announcement was made on 6 December 2012. Albirex Niigata Singapore finished second runner-up in the battle for second place, after a 3–1 defeat to Home United at Bishan Stadium during their last match day of the season, in which the White Swans needed a victory against the Protectors. He made 32 appearances and scored 7 goals in all competitions.

=== Home United ===
In November 2013, Bruno signed with S.League rival Home United.

=== Geylang International ===
On 23 December 2014, Bruno signed with Geylang International in the upcoming 2015 S.League campaign, where he was reunited with former Albirex Niigata Singapore teammates Tatsuro Inui, Kento Fukuda, and Yuki Ichikawa. On 4 October 2015, he scored a hat-trick against Courts Young Lions, ending Geylang International's nine-game winless streak.

=== Back to Japan ===
Brunep returned to Japan to play for the J2 League team FC Gifu in 2016.

=== Negeri Sembilan FA ===
Bruno was signed by Negeri Sembilan FA, a club playing in the Malaysia Premier League in 2017. After good performances in the season, during which he scored 11 league goals, he was transferred to rival club in the same league, Terengganu II in early 2018.

=== Loan to Terengganu ===
Later in April the same year, he was brought to Terengganu II's main team, Terengganu on a short-term basis. He returned to Terengganu II after Terengganu I secured another import player in June 2018.

=== Chonburi ===
In 2021, Terengganu has decided not to extend Bruno's contract and release him. Bruno was in negotiations with Chonburi in Thai League 1 but discussions were unsuccessful due to the COVID-19 pandemic in Thailand.

=== PDRM ===
Bruno signed a one-year contract with PDRM. On 10 December 2023, he scored his first hat-trick for the club in the 2023 Malaysia Super League fixture against Kelantan in a 7–2 win.

=== Penang ===
On 1 July 2025, Bruno signed with Malaysia Super League club Penang after leaving PDRM on free transfer.

== Personal life ==
Born in Brazil, Bruno was raised in Japan, his mother's country. As a result, he holds Japanese citizenship.

== Club statistics ==
Updated to 1 November 2017.

Club performance			League		Cup		League Cup		Total	
Season	Club	League	Apps	Goals	Apps	Goals	Apps	Goals	Apps	Goals
Japan			League		Emperor's Cup FA Cup		J. League Cup League Cup		Total	
2009	Albirex Niigata	J1 League	0	0	–		0	0	0	0
2009	Machida Zelvia	JFL	3	0	–		–		3	0
2010	Albirex Niigata	J1 League	0	0	–		0	0	0	0
2012	Albirex Niigata	J1 League	0	0	0	0	0	0	0	0
Singapore			League		Singapore Cup		League Cup		Total	
2013	Albirex Niigata (S)	S.League	0	0	–		0	0	27	6
2014	Home United	S.League	0	0	–		0	0	25	8
2015	Geylang International	S.League	0	0	–		0	0	25	12
Japan			League		Emperor's Cup FA Cup		J. League Cup League Cup		Total	
2016	FC Gifu	J2 League	0	0	–		0	0	11	3
Malaysia			League		FA Cup		Malaysia Cup		Total	
2017	Negeri Sembilan	MPL	19	11	6	1	3	1	28	13
2025–26	Penang	Malaysia Super League	9	0	4	0	0	0	13	0
2025–26	Total		0	0	0	0	0	0	0	0
Career total			3	0	0	0	0	0	3	0

== Convert to Islam ==
On 2 August 2023, Bruno converted to Islam at the PULAPOL Mosque, Kuala Lumpur, and was witnessed by PULAPOL Commander SAC Nor Hisam Nordin with a few other Muslim football players and the coach of PDRM FC. .

He recited the syahadah in front of the JAWI officer (Federal Territory Islamic Religious Department : Jabatan Agama Islam Wilayah Persekutuan).

== Honours ==
Albirex Niigata Singapore

- Singapore League Cup: 2011

Home United

- Singapore Cup runner-up: 2014
- Singapore Community Shield runner-up: 2014

Terengganu II

- Malaysia Challenge Cup: 2018

Terengganu FC

- Sheikh Kamal International Club Cup: 2019

PDRM

- MFL Challenge Cup : 2023

Penang

- MFL Challenge Cup runner-up: 2026
