= List of foreign footballers in Malaysia =

This is a list of non-Malaysian footballers who currently plays or have played football in Malaysia.

Players in bold indicate players currently playing in the Malaysian football league system. Flags represent the player's country of birth, in case it is different from his main nationality.

== Asia – AFC ==
=== Afghanistan ===
- Faysal Shayesteh – (Pahang FA) – 2016
- Mohammad Naeem Rahimi – (DRB-Hicom) – 2014
- Mustafa Zazai – (Kelantan FA) – 2019
- Omid Musawi – Selangor, Penang – 2024–2026, 2026

=== Australia ===
- Ivan Zelic – Johor FC – 2003
- Jason Williams – Negeri Sembilan FC – 2006–2008
- Ross Aloisi – (Selangor FA) – 2004
- Zac Anderson – (Kedah FA) – 2017, – (PKNS F.C.) – 2018, – (Perak FA) – 2019
- Jonathan Ben Angelucci – (Johor FC) – 2003
- Walter Ardone – (Malacca FA) – 1991
- Nahuel Arrarte – (Johor FC) – 2004
- James Aschner – Johor FC – 1998
- Zeljko Babic – (Johor FC) – 2005
- Michael Baird – (Sabah) – 2012
- Alexander Thomas Becerra – (PBAPP) – 2014
- Matthew Bingley – (Pahang FA) – 2004
- Josip Biskic – (Selangor FA)– 1995–1996, (Melaka FA) – 1996
- Milan Blagojevic – (Johor FA) – 1997–1998
- William Bone – (Sarawak FA) 1997–1998
- Mathew Borg – Johor FC – 2004
- Nick Bosevski – (Johor FC) – 2004
- Rodney Brown – Penang FA – 1991
- Joe Caleta – (Perak FA) – 2000–2003
- Gus Cerro – (Pahang FA) – 1995 (Negeri Sembilan FA) – 1996–1998
- Joel Chianese – (Sabah) – 2015, (Negeri Sembilan) – 2016
- Andrew Clark – (Kedah FA) – 2003
- Simon Colosimo – (Pahang FA) – 2004
- Robert Cornthwaite – (Selangor) – 2015–2016 (Perak) – 2018
- Jeff Curran – (Sarawak FA) – 1991–1994
- Emile Damey – (DRB-Hicom) – 2014
- Tayfun Devrimol – Johor FA – 2004
- Dino Djulbic – Felda United – 2017
- Spase Dilevski – (Armed Forces) – 2014–2015
- Alan Edward Davidson – (Pahang FA) – 1992–1996
- Travis Dodd – (Johor FC) – 2004
- Paul Donnelly – (PDRM FA) – 1993
- Robert Dunn – (Selangor FA) – 1992
- Mehmet Durakovic – (Selangor FA) – 1995–1998
- Geoff Dwyer – (Penang FA) – 2003
- Alistair Edwards – (Singapore FA) – 1990, 1993, (Johor FA) – 1991–1992, (Sarawak FA) – 1997–1998
- Cameron Edwards – SPA F.C. – 2015
- David Evans – (Sarawak FA) – 1991–1997
- Diogo Ferreira – Penang FA – 2017
- Craig Foster – (Singapore FA) – 1991
- Robert Gaspar – (Sabah FA) – 2003–2004
- Tony Gasparetto - (Kedah FA) – 1995
- Michael Glassock – (Sri Pahang) – 2023
- Aytek Genç – (Johor FC) – 1994–1995, 1996, 1997–1998
- Antony Golec – (Perak FC) – 2020
- Garry Gomez – (Kelantan FA) – 1994
- Ross Greer – (Selangor FA) – 1992–1993
- Adam Griffiths – (Selangor) – 2013, (Kedah) – 2014–2015
- Brent Griffiths – (Penang) – 2015–2016
- Ryan Griffiths – (Sarawak) – 2014–2015
- Troy Halpin – Johor FA – 2003
- David Harding – Johor FC – 2005–2006
- Dean Heffernan – (MK Land FC) – 2004
- Henrique – Negeri Sembilan FA – 2016
- Chris Herd – (Terengganu FC) – 2021
- John Hunter – (Sarawak FA) – 1991–1995
- Doug Ithier – (Sarawak FA) – 1998
- George Jolevski – (Kedah FA) – 1991
- Ante Juric – Johor FC – 2003, Pahang FA – 2004–2005
- Mirko Jurilj – Johor FC – 1995–1996, 1998
- Vasilios Kalogeracos – (Kuala Lumpur) – 1995–1996
- Mario Karlović – (Terengganu FA) – 2014, (ATM FA) – 2015, (Kuala Lumpur) – 2016
- Ante Kovacevic – (Selangor F.C.) – 2004–2005
- Ndumba Makeche – (FELDA United F.C.) – 2014–2015, (Sarawak FA) – 2016, (Perlis) – 2017–2018, (Penang FA) – 2019
- Tommy Maras – (Kuala Lumpur FA) – 1994–1995
- Jonathan McKain – (Kelantan) – 2015–2016
- Gabriel Mendez – (Johor FC) – 2003, (Kedah FA) – 2005–2006
- Ante Milicic – (Pahang FA) – 2004, (Shahzan Muda FC) – 2007–2008
- David John Miller – Perak FA – 1996–1997
- Dean Milner – (Kuala Lumpur FA) – 1995
- Reinaldo Mineiro – Sime Darby FC – 2015
- David Mitchell – (Selangor FA) – 1995–1996
- Srećko Mitrović – (Sabah) – 2014
- James Monie – (Kedah FA) – 2003
- Tristam Morgan – (Negeri Sembilan FA) – 1997
- Peter Murphy – Malacca FA – 1992
- Andrew Nabbout – (Negeri Sembilan) – 2016
- Craig Naven – (Sarawak FA) – 1997–1999
- Dean Nicolaou – (PDRM FA) – 1992
- Scott O'Donell – (Kuala Lumpur FA) – 1994–1995
- Scott Ollerenshaw – (Sabah FA) – 1994–1997, (Negeri Sembilan FA) – 1998
- Boris Ovcin – (Penang FA) – 2003–2004
- Greg Owens – (Johor FC) – 2005
- Steve Pantelidis – (Selangor) – 2013–2014
- Adriano Pellegrino – (Kedah) – 2014
- Mickey Peterson – (Pahang FA) – 1993
- Dimitri Petratos – (Kelantan) – 2013
- Tom Pondeljak – Johor FA – 2004
- Mitchell Prentice – (Pahang FA) –2006–2007
- Taylor Regan – (Negeri Sembilan) – 2016, – (Selangor FA) – 2019–2020, (Sarawak United) – 2021
- Pedro Ricoy – (Negeri Sembilan FA) – 1994
- Paul "PJ" Roberts – (Sarawak FA) – 2002
- Michael Roki – (PDRM FA) – 1992, (Kuala Lumpur FA) – 1994
- Marko Rudan – (Public Bank FC) – 2004
- Abbas Saad – (Singapore FA) – 1990, 1993–1994, (Johor FA) – 1991–1992
- Michael Santalab – (Johor FC) – 2004
- John Saunders – (PDRM FA) – 1992
- Vince Savoca – Johor FC – 2002
- Marshall Soper – (Penang FA) – 1991, (Perak FA) – 1995
- Yaren Sözer – (Perak FC) – 2020
- Warren Spink – (Singapore FA) – 1991
- Darren Stewart – (Johor FA) – 1993–1997
- Phil Stubbins – (PDRM FA) – 1993
- Goran Šubara – (T-Team F.C.) – 2014
- John Tambouras – (Pahang FA) – 2006
- Shane Thompson – (Sarawak FA) – 2005
- Kris Trajanovski – Johor FC – 1998
- Peter Tsolakis – (Malacca FA) – 199x
- Daniel Watkins – Johor FC – 2003, 2004
- **Giancarlo Gallifuoco** – (**KL City**) – 2021–
- **Shane Lowry** – (**JDT**) – 2021–
- **Dylan Wenzel-Halls** – Penang, **Kuching City** – 2024–2026, 2026–
- **Jordan Murray** – **DPMM FC** – 2025–
- Dean Pelekanos – Sabah – 2025–2026
- **Kayden Soper** – Manjung City, **Kelantan Red Warrior** – 2024–2025, 2025–

=== Bahrain ===
- Thiago Augusto – Felda United – 2015–2016, 2017–2018, Kedah – 2016
- Jaycee John – Felda United – 2019
- **Moses Atede** – Kedah – 2023, **Kuching City F.C.** – 2024–
- **Habib Haroon** – Terengganu, Kedah Darul Aman, **Kelantan TRW** — 2021–2023, 2024, 2025–

=== Brunei ===
- Adi Said – (UiTM F.C.) – 2019
- Mohd Nazmi Osman – (Sabah)

=== Cambodia ===
- Thierry Bin – (Terengganu F.C.) – 2018–19, (Perak FA) 2020
- Chan Vathanaka – (Pahang FA), (PKNS FC) – 2018, 2019
- Keo Sokpheng – (PKNP F.C.) – 2018
- Boris Kok – Sarawak United – 2022
- Prak Mony Udom – (Negeri Sembilan) – 2018

=== China ===
- Jia Xiuquan – (PDRM FA) – 1991–1992
- Zhu Bo – (PDRM FA) – 1991–1992

=== Guam ===
- John Matkin – (UiTM FC) – 2016
- Brandon McDonald – Penang F.C. – 2017

=== Hong Kong ===
- Tim Bredbury – (Selangor FA) – 1992, (Sabah FA) – 1993
- Ross Greer – (Selangor FA) – 1992–1993
- Andy Russell – (Penang FA) – 2017

=== India ===
- Baichung Bhutia – (Perak FA), (MK Land FC) – 2003, 2005

=== Indonesia ===
- Nol van der Vin – Penang FA – 1956–1961
- Ristomoyo Kassim – Selangor FA – 1986–1987, Public Bank FC – 1988, ATM FA – 1989
- Robby Darwis – Kelantan FA – 1989
- Rahmad Darmawan – ATM FA – 1992–1993
- Suharto AD – ATM FA – 1993
- Eri Irianto – Kuala Lumpur FA – 1996
- Fakhri Husaini – Kuala Lumpur FA – 1996
- Rachmadhani Firhad – Dewan Bandaraya Ipoh FC – 2005
- Kurniawan Dwi Yulianto – Sarawak FA 2005–2006
- Bambang Pamungkas – Selangor FA – 2005–2007
- Elie Aiboy – Selangor F.C. – 2005–2007
- Ponaryo Astaman – Telekom Melaka FC – 2006–2007
- Ilham Jaya Kesuma – MPPJ FC – 2006–2007
- Budi Sudarsono – PDRM FA – 2007–2008
- Patrich Wanggai – T-Team – 2014
- Hamka Hamzah – PKNS – 2014
- Beto – Penang – 2015
- Dedi Kusnandar – Sabah – 2016
- Osas Saha – Penang FA – 2016
- Steven Imbiri – MISC-MIFA – 2017
- Achmad Jufriyanto – Kuala Lumpur FA – 2018
- David Laly – Felcra FC – 2018
- Yusril Maulana – Shah Alam Antlers – 2018
- Ferdinand Sinaga – Kelantan FA – 2018
- Andik Vermansyah – Selangor, Kedah Darul Aman – 2014–2017, 2018
- Ilham Armaiyn – Selangor F.C. – 2018
- Evan Dimas – Selangor FA – 2018
- Rian Firmansyah – Sarawak FA – 2019
- Zoubairou Garba – Perak FC – 2021
- Ryuji Utomo – Penang – 2021
- Syahrian Abimanyu – JDT – 2021–2022
- Natanael Siringoringo – Kelantan FC – 2021–2023
- Johan Nathaniel Muliadi – Kelantan Darul Naim – 2024
- Saddil Ramdani – Sri Pahang – 2019, Sabah – 2021–2025
- Jordi Amat – (JDT) – 2022–2025
- Ramadhan Sananta – DPMM – 2025–2026
- **Irfan Jaya** – **Kuching City** – 2026–

=== Iran ===
- Alireza Abbasfard – Sarawak – 2014
- Milad Zeneyedpour – UKM F.C. – 2019, Sarawak FA – 2020
- **Amirali Chegini** – **Immigration** – 2025–

=== Iraq ===
- Riyadh Abbas – Kelantan – 1996, Johor FA – 1997
- Hayder Majeed – Johor FC – 1998
- Hussein Alaa Hussein – Kelantan – 2014
- Anmar Almubaraki – Kedah – 2019
- Selwan Al-Jaberi – Kelantan United – 2020

=== Japan ===
- Shuhei Fukai – Kelantan United – 2021–2022
- Kenta Hara – Kelantan FC – 2022
- Hayato Hashimoto – DRB-Hicom – 2015
- Shotaro Hattori – (DRB-Hicom) – 2014
- Kei Hirose – (JDT II) – 2020–2021
- Kei Ikeda – Felda United – 2019
- Hiroyuki Ishida – (Johor FC) – 2006
- Dan Ito – (Penang FA) – 2005
- Masaya Jitozono – Sabah FA – 2017
- Taiki Kagayama – (Sabah) – 2022
- Ryutaro Karube – Kuala Lumpur FA – 2018–2019
- Kota Kawase – UiTM FC – 2018
- Reiya Kinoshita – Ultimate F.C. – 2020
- Kenta Kishi – PIB FC – 2020
- Takahiro Kunimoto – JDT – 2023
- Ryutaro Megumi – Felda United – 2020
- Ryohei Miyazaki – Melawati F.C. – 2020
- Masashi Motoyama – Kelantan United – 2021–2022
- Shunsuke Nakatake – (Kuantan FA) – 2016–2017, – (PDRM FA) – 2018, – (Negeri Sembilan FA) – 2019–2020
- Ryu Nascimento – Langkawi City F.C. – 2020
- Keisuke Ogawa – (PKNS) – 2015, (Sabah FA) – 2018
- Yuta Suzuki – Kuching City – 2019–2021
- Terukazu Tanaka – (DRB-Hicom) – 2015 — (Kelantan United) – 2021
- Masaki Watanabe – Perlis FA – 2019, Felda United – 2019–2020, Kelantan FC – 2020, Terengganu FC – 2021
- Ryu Yamaguchi – Penang – 2023
- Sasa Yusuke – (Sarawak FA) – 2007, (Sabah FA)
- **Bruno Suzuki** – (Negeri Sembilan) – 2017, (Terengganu II F.C.) – 2018–2020, (**PDRM**) – 2021–2022, 2023–
- **Yuki Tanigawa** – (**Kuching City**) – 2020, 2022–
- **Takumi Sasaki** – **Negeri Sembilan** – 2024–
- **Mio Tsuneyasu** – **Negeri Sembilan** – 2025–
- **Kei Oshiro** – **Negeri Sembilan** – 2026–
- **Yūichi Hirano** – **Negeri Sembilan** – 2026–
- **Kaishu Yamazaki** – **Kuching City** – 2026–

=== Jordan ===
- Mahmoud Za'tara – Sri Pahang – 2022
- Baha' Abdel-Rahman – Selangor – 2022
- Mahmoud Al-Mardi – Kedah Darul Aman – 2022
- Yazan Al-Arab – Selangor – 2022–2023
- Reziq Bani Hani – Selangor – 2024
- Ali Olwan – Selangor F.C. – 2024–2025
- **Fadi Awad** – **PDRM** – 2022–
- Noor Al-Rawabdeh – Selangor – 2023–2026
- Mohammad Abualnadi – Selangor – 2024–2026

=== Kyrgyzstan ===
- Pavel Matiash – (UiTM FC) – 2016
- Veniamin Shumeyko – UiTM FC – 2018
- Edgar Bernhardt – (Kedah FA) – 2019
- Bakhtiyar Duyshobekov – (Kelantan FA) – 2018
- Akhlidin Israilov – UiTM FC – 2019
- Tamirlan Kozubaev – PKNS FC – 2019
- Azamat Baimatov – Kuala Lumpur City F.C. – 2020
- Ernist Batyrkanov – Kelantan United – 2023
- Adilet Kanybekov – Perak FC – 2024

=== Laos ===
- Billy Ketkeophomphone – Sri Pahang FC – 2022

=== Lebanon ===
- Abou Bakr Al-Mel – (Kelantan) – 2017, (UiTM) – 2020–2021
- Fadel Antar – (Kelantan) – 2022
- Rabih Ataya – (UiTM) – 2020, (Kedah Darul Aman) – 2021
- Samir Ayass – (Perak) – 2021
- Hassan Chaito – (Terengganu) – 2014–2015
- Zakaria Charara – (Kelantan – 2012, Kuala Lumpur) – 2012
- Hassan Daher – (Perak) – 2014
- Ramez Dayoub – (Selangor) – 2011–2013
- Hussein El Dor – (Perak) – 2019
- Hassan El Mohamad – (Sarawak) – 2014
- Buddy Farah – (Selangor) – 2005–2006
- Mohamad Ghaddar – (Kelantan) – 2012, 2014, 2017, 2018, (Felda United) – 2013, (Johor Darul Ta'zim) – 2017, (Johor Darul Ta'zim II) – 2019
- Hilal El-Helwe – (Penang) – 2022
- Mootaz El Jounaidi – (FELDA United) – 2017
- Khalil Khamis – (Pahang) – 2020
- Newton – (Penang) – 2006–2007
- Jad Noureddine – (Perak) – 2018, 2021
- Soony Saad – Penang – 2023
- Mamadou Wague – (Sri Pahang FC) – 2021

=== Maldives ===
- Ibrahim Fazeel – (DPMM FC) – 2007–2008
- Ali Ashfaq – (DPMM FC) – 2007–08, (PDRM FA) – 2014–2016

=== Myanmar ===
- Tin Myint Aung – ATM FA – 1990–1991
- Than Toe Aung – ATM FA – 1990–1991
- Win Aung – (Singapore FA) – 1991
- Kyi Lwin – (Perak FA) – 1990–1992
- Aung Naing – (Perak FA) – 1990–1992
- Aung Tun Tun – (Perlis FA) – 1991–1992
- Myo Hlaing Win – ATM FA – 1990–1991
- Kyaw Zayar Win – (Perak) – 2014
- Zaw Min Tun – Penang – 2023
- Aung Kaung Mann – Sri Pahang FC, Kelantan Darul Naim F.C. – 2021, 2024–2025
- **Hein Htet Aung** – Selangor, Negeri Sembilan, **Kelantan The Real Warriors** – 2021–2023, 2024–2025, 2025–
- **Kyaw Min Oo** – PDRM, Terengganu, **DPMM** – 2023–2025, 2025–2026, 2026–
- **Thiha Zaw** – **Immigration** – 2025–
- **Wai Linn Aung** – **Negeri Sembilan FC** – 2025–

=== Nepal ===
- Rohit Chand – T-Team F.C. – 2016
- **Gillespye Jung Karki** – **PDRM** – 2026–

=== Oman ===
- Mohamed Ali Al-Rashdy – Malacca FA – 1989

=== Pakistan ===
- Zesh Rahman – Pahang – 2014–2016
- Otis Khan – Kelantan Red Warrior – 2025–2026

=== Palestine ===
- Patricio Acevedo – Kelantan FA – 2006–2007
- Matias Jadue – PKNS – 2016
- Jonathan Cantillana – Kuala Lumpur – 2016
- Yashir Islame – Melaka United, Perak, PKNP, Negeri Sembilan – 2016, 2017, 2019–2020, 2022
- Layth Kharoub – Kelantan Darul Naim F.C. – 2024–2025
- Oday Kharoub – Kelantan Darul Naim, Negeri Sembilan – 2024–2025, 2026

=== Philippines ===
- Misagh Bahadoran – Perak – 2018
- Iain Ramsay – (Felda United) – 2018
- Álvaro Silva – Kedah Darul Aman F.C. – 2018
- Ángel Guirado – Negeri Sembilan FA – 2018
- Joshua Grommen – Petaling Jaya City F.C. – 2019
- Mark Hartmann – Sarawak – 2017, Penang F.C. – 2017, PJ City – 2020, UiTM FC – 2020
- Amin Nazari – (Kedah Darul Aman F.C.) – 2020
- Adam Michael Reed – Pahang F.C. – 2020
- Luke Woodland – (Kuala Lumpur City F.C.) – 2019, (Terengganu FC) – 2022
- Justin Baas – Melaka United – 2022
- Kevin Ingreso – Sri Pahang FC – 2022–2023
- Carli de Murga – Terengganu FC – 2021, JDT – 2022, Kelantan FC – 2023
- Curt Dizon – Penang – 2023
- Omid Nazari – (Melaka United) – 2017, (Negeri Sembilan FC) – 2022, (Terengganu FC) – 2023
- Jesper Nyholm – Perak FC – 2023
- Manuel Ott – Melaka United – 2021, Terengganu FC – 2022, 2024–2025, Kedah – 2023
- OJ Porteria – Kelantan United – 2023
- Julian Schwarzer – Kuching City – 2023
- Christian Rontini – Penang – 2022, Kelantan FC – 2023
- Bienvenido Maranon – JDT II –2022–2023
- Kevin Ray Mendoza – KL City – 2021–2023
- Patrick Reichelt – Melaka United F.C. – 2019, KL City – 2023–2025
- **Amani Aguinaldo** – PKNP F.C. – 2019 — **DPMM FC** — 2025–
- **Óscar Arribas** – **JDT** – 2023–
- **Simen Lyngbø** – Kelantan TRW, **Melaka** – 2025–2026, 2026–
- **Scott Woods** – **Kuching City** – 2025–
- **Quincy Kammeraad** – **KL City** – 2025–
- **Jun Badelic** – **Melaka** — 2025–2026
- **Charles Dabao** – **Melaka** – 2025

=== Qatar ===
- **Andri Syahputra** – **Johor Darul Ta'zim** – 2026–

=== Singapore ===
- Faliq Abdulkader – (Melaka FA)
- Zainal Abidin – (Terengganu FA) – 198x
- Borhan Abu Samah – (Pahang FA) – 1992
- Fandi Ahmad – (Kuala Lumpur FA) – 1986–1989, (Pahang FA) – 1991–1992
- Mohd Noh Alam Shah – (PDRM FA) – 2007–08
- Khairul Amri – Felda United – 2019–2020
- Abdul Malek Awab – (Kuala Lumpur FA) – 1984–1988, (PDRM FA) – 1988–1989
- Safuwan Baharudin – (PDRM) – 2016–17, (Sri Pahang) – 2018–19, (Selangor) 2020– (Negeri Sembilan) 2023,
- Agu Casmir – (PDRM FA) – 2008
- Precious Emuejeraye – SPA F.C. – 2015
- Shakir Hamzah – (Kedah Darul Aman) – 2019–20, (Perak) – 2021
- Yasir Hanapi – PDRM FC – 2017
- Hasnim Haron – (Johor FA) – 1993–1996
- Hariss Harun – (Johor Darul Ta'zim) – 2013–2017, 2019–2022
- Shahril Ishak – (Johor Darul Ta'zim II) – 2013–2016
- Aide Iskandar – (Johor FA) – 2006–2007
- Nasir Jalil – (Terengganu FA) – 1982–1988
- K. Kannan – (Kuala Lumpur FA) – 1986–1987, 1989–1991
- Baihakki Khaizan – (Johor Darul Ta'zim) – 2013–2014, (Johor Darul Ta'zim II) – 2015–2016
- Ahmad Latiff Khamaruddin – (PDRM FA) – 2007–2008 (Johor FA) – 2005
- Anumanthan Kumar – Kedah – 2021
- George Lee – (Kuala Lumpur FA) – 1982–1984
- Armin Maier – JDT II – 2019, Selangor FC II – 2020–2021
- Ahmad Ibrahim Maksudi – (Kelantan FA) – 1989
- Syed Mutalib – (Terengganu FA) – 198x–1983
- Fazrul Nawaz – (Sabah) – 2015
- Ahmad Paijan – (Terengganu FA) – 1987–1996
- Terry Pathmanathan – (Pahang FA) – 1982–1987
- Faris Ramli – (PKNS F.C.) – 2018, (Terengganu) – 2020
- Razali Rashid – (Kelantan FA) – 1989
- Norhalis Shafik – (Terengganu FA) – 1982–1989
- Sahil Suhaimi – Sarawak FA – 2017
- Hafiz Sujad – (Johor Darul Ta'zim II) – 2018
- Shahdan Sulaiman – (Melaka United) – 2018
- V. Sundramoorthy – (Kedah FA) – 1989–1990, (Pahang FA) – 1991–1992, (Kelantan FA) – 1994
- R. Suriamurthy – (Pahang FA) – 1982–1988, (Negeri Sembilan FA) – 1989, (PDRM FA) – 1990, (Melaka FA) – 1991
- Amirul Adli – Negeri Sembilan – 2026
- Zulfahmi Arifin – Immigration – 2026

=== South Korea ===
- Yun Woon-chul – (Telekom Malacca) – 2006–07
- An Sae-hee – Penang – 2023
- Bae Beom-geun – Negeri Sembilan FC – 2021
- Bae Kyeong-hwan – Kelantan Darul Naim F.C. – 2024
- Bang Seung-Hwan – UiTM – 2014, Kedah – 2015–2016
- Choi Hyun-yeon – Kuala Lumpur – 2015
- **Do Dong-hyun** – UiTM, Kelantan The Real Warriors, Terengganu, **Melaka** – 2017, 2018, 2018, 2026–
- Goo Ah-hwoi – Kelantan Darul Naim F.C. – 2024
- Ha Dae-won – Sime Darby – 2016
- Heo Jae-nyeong – Sabah – 2018
- Heo Jae-Won – (Sri Pahang) – 2017
- Hwang Sin-young – (Selangor United) – 2019
- Im Kyung-hyun – Kuantan FA – 2015
- Jang Jung – (Perak FA) – 1990–1992, (Singapore FA) – 1993
- Jang Suk-won – Melaka United – 2019–2021, Kedah – 2022
- Jeon Kyung-Joon – (DPMM FC) – 2007
- Jeon Woo-young – (Melaka United) – 2017–2018
- Jeong Seok-min – Penang FA – 2016
- Jung Byung-ju – Kelantan Darul Naim F.C. – 2024
- Kang Jin-wook – UiTM – 2016
- Kang Seung-jo – (Penang FA) – 2018–2019, (Kelantan) – 2020
- Kang Yi-chan – Kelantan FC – 2023
- Kim Bong-jin – PJ City – 2020
- Kim Chi-gon – (Sarawak FA) – 2018
- Kim Deok – Kelantan United – 2023
- Kim Do-heon – (Negeri Sembilan FA) – 2018
- Kim Dong-Chan – PKNS – 2013–2014
- Kim Hyun-woo – PKNP FC – 2017, Terengganu FC – 2018
- Kim Jin-Yong – Negeri Sembilan – 2014–2015, DRB-Hicom – 2016
- Kim Min-gyu – Kelantan FC – 2023
- Kim Min-kyu – Kelantan United – 2023
- Kim Ri-gwan – Kelantan Darul Naim F.C. – 2024
- Kim Sang-woo – PKNP FC – 2018
- Kim Seng-hoon – Perak FA – 1997
- Kim Sung-ho – Penjara F.C. – 2019
- Kim Youn-do – Perak – 2023
- Ko Kwang-min – Sabah – 2023–2025
- Kwon Jun – DRB-Hicom, SPA FC – 2014, 2015
- Kwon Yong-hyun – UiTM FC – 2021
- Lee Chang-hoon – (Melaka United) – 2018, (PDRM FA) – 2019, (Penang) – 2020, (Sarawak United) – 2021–2022
- Lee Jeong-geun – Sri Pahang FC – 2023
- Lee Ji-yong – Sri Pahang FC – 2023
- Lee Jin-seuk – Kuala Lumpur FA – 2015
- Lee Jong-ho – Sarawak FA – 2017
- Lee Joo-han – Perak FC – 2023
- Lee Ju-hang – Kuala Lumpur Rovers – 2024
- Lee Jun-hyeob – (Terengganu F.C.) – 2018
- Lee Kil-Hoon – Penang – 2014, Sime Darby – 2016, Sabah – 2017–2018
- Lee Kwang-hui – Negeri Sembilan FC – 2024
- Lee Kwang-hyun – Penang FA – 2013–2014, Kuantan FA – 2015
- Lee Kyeong-su – Melawati F.C. – 2019
- Lee Seong-woo – UKM F.C. – 2020
- Lee Sung-hyun – Kuala Lumpur FA – 2015
- Lee Kwang-Hyun – Penang FA – 2014, Kuantan – 2015
- Moon Si-hyun – Kuala Lumpur Rovers – 2024
- Nam Se-in – (UKM F.C.) – 2018
- Lee Tae-min – Perak FC – 2024
- Namgung Woong – Kedah – 2014, Perak – 2015
- Noh Haeng-seok – Kuala Lumpur FA – 2019
- Noh Sang-min – UiTM FC – 2018
- Oh Joo-ho – UiTM FC – 2016
- Oh Kyu-bin – Perlis FA – 2017
- Park Chul-hyung – UiTM FC – 2015–2016
- Park Kwang-il – PKNS FC – 2017
- Park Yong-Ho – Armed Forces – 2014
- Park Yong-joon – (Perlis) – 2016–2017
- Seo Seonung – Perak – 2023
- Shim Un-seob – Kuantan FA, PDRM FC 2016–2017, 2018
- Shin Hyun-joon – SPA F.C. – 2014
- Shin Jae-pil – Melaka United, MISC-MIFA 2016, 2017
- Sim Hyun-ki – Perak FC – 2023
- Chang Jae-hyeok – PDRM FC – 2024–2025
- Um-Deuk – PDRM FC – 2024–2025
- Yeon Gi-sung –PKNP FC – 2018
- **Park Tae-soo** – Sabah, **PDRM** – 2019–2025, 2025–
- **Park Jun-heong** – Johor Darul Ta'zim, **Kuching City** – 2024–2026, 2026–
- **An Sang-su** – **Negeri Sembilan FC** – 2024–
- **Lim In-Kyu** – **Penang** – 2025–
- **Lee Keon-il** – **Bunga Raya** – 2025–
- **Kim Jong-hyun** – **Machan** – 2025–
- **Jun Seungwon** – **Machan** – 2025–
- **Lee Hang-Seong** – **Armed Forces** – 2025–

=== Sri Lanka ===
- Roshan Perera – NS Chempaka FC – 1998

=== Syria ===
- Mahmoud Amnah – Sime Darby – 2013–2014
- Jalil Elías – JDT – 2024
- Marwan Sayedeh – Sabah – 2013–2014

=== Tajikistan ===
- Siyovush Asrorov – PKNP FC – 2019
- Sheriddin Boboev – Penang – 2021
- Nuriddin Davronov – Kuching City – 2023
- Amirbek Juraboev – Kedah – 2023

=== Thailand ===
- Thongchai Akkarapong – Kelantan FA – 2003–2004
- Syed Bukhari – (Kelantan FA) – 2002
- Dennis Buschening – Sabah – 2020, UiTM FC – 2021, Kedah – 2022, Kelantan FC – 2023
- Attapol Buspakom – (Pahang FA) – 1989–1991, 1994–1996
- Prasert Changmool – (Kelantan FA) – 1990
- Faiso Che-moh – Northern Lions F.C. – 2020
- Wittawin Chowuttiwat – (Perlis) – 2013–2014
- Sanrawat Dechmitr – (Kedah Darul Aman) – 2022
- Suriya Domtaisong – (SKMK FC) – 2003, (Kelantan FA) – 2005–2006
- Somkeat Fompeh – (Perlis) – 1989–1990
- Praduphan Jarunnya – (Perlis) – 1989–1990
- Anawin Jujeen – PJ City – 2020
- Chatchaval Kenjanahoot – (Negeri Sembilan FA) – 1989, (Penang FA) – 1990
- Vitoon Kijmongkolsak – (Pahang FA) – 1986–1990, Penang FA) – 1991–1992
- Witthawin Klorwutthiwat – Perlis FA – 2014
- Adisak Kraisorn – (Terengganu) – 2023
- Sombat Leekumnerdthat – Brunei – 1990
- Saranuwat Nasartsang – SKMK F.C. – 2004
- P. Omjard – Brunei – 1990
- Krangkai Pettkul – Brunei – 1990
- Anan Phangseng – (Kelantan FA) – 1990
- Kittiphong Pluemjai – (PKNS F.C.) – 2019
- Watana Ponchanakong – Penang FA – 1990
- Boonphob Praphut – (Kelantan FA) – 1990
- Choketawee Promrut – (Johor FC) – 2007
- Piyapong Pue-on – (Pahang FA) – 1986–1989
- Naruphon Putsorn – Melaka United – 2020
- Sarif Sainui – (Kelantan FA) – 2005–2006
- Abdulbasit Salaeh – Northern Lions F.C. – 2020
- Likit Sanatong – (Negeri Sembilan FA) – 1989
- Ronnachai Sayomchai – (Pahang FA) – 1987–1988, 1989–1990
- Kiatisuk Senamuang – (Perlis FA) – 1998–1999
- Voravut Srikama – (Kelantan FA) – 2002
- Worrawoot Srimaka – (Kelantan FA) – 2005–2006
- Nakul Wattanakeunkaan – (Perlis) – 1989–1992
- **Picha Autra** – **Selangor** – 2025–
- **Kevin Deeromram** – **Selangor** – 2025–

=== Timor-Leste ===
- Pedro Henrique – PKNS FC – 2015, PJ City – 2019, Sri Pahang FC – 2021, Kuching City – 2023–2024
- Juninho – Selangor – 2013, Sarawak FA – 2016, Kuala Lumpur City F.C. – 2018
- **João Pedro** – UiTM FC – 2021 – **Kuching City** – 2025–
- **Thiago Fernandes** – **Penang** – 2025–

=== Turkmenistan ===
- Ahmet Ataýew – (Sabah) – 2019
- Serdar Geldiýew – (PDRM FA) – 2020
- Şöhrat Söýünow – (PDRM FA) – 2020

=== Uzbekistan ===
- Sergei Zavalniuk – (Perlis FA) – 1993
- Sadriddin Abdullaev – (T-Team FC) – 2015
- Rustam Abdulloev- (Perlis FA) – 1995
- Azamat Abduraimov – (Pahang FA) – 1994–1995
- Bobirjon Akbarov – (Kuala Lumpur FA) – 2017–2018
- Ikbol Babakhanov – ATM FA – 2016–2017
- Moustava Belialov – (Perak FA) – 1993–1994
- Umar Eshmurodov – Selangor FC – 2024
- Sherzod Fayziev – (Sri Pahang) – 2022–2023
- Maksimilian Fomin – PDRM FA – 2017
- Shukhrat Khalmirzaev – (Perak FA) – 1993
- Davron Khashimov – Sime Darby FC – 2014
- Oybek Kilichev – Perak FA – 2016
- Alexander Kochokov – (Melaka FA) – 1995, (Terengganu FA) – 1996
- Yaroslav Krushelnitskiy – (Felda United) – 2013
- Sardor Kulmatov – Terengganu FC – 2023–
- Sirojiddin Kuziev – Kuching City – 2023
- Kudrat Madaninov – (Terengganu FA) – 1996–1997
- Viktor Makarov – (Kuala Lumpur FA) – 1993
- Sukhrob Nurullaev – Kedah Darul Aman – 2024
- Nikita Pavlenko – Selangor United – 2019
- Pavel Purishkin – (UiTM FC) – 2016
- Sirojiddin Rakhmatullaev – ATM FA – 2016–2017, Kelantan United – 2023
- Kuvondik Ruziev – Sri Pahang FC – 2023–2024
- Sanjar Shaakhmedov – (Terengganu FC) – 2019–2020
- Dilshod Sharofetdinov – (Sime Darby) – 2014–2015, (T-Team F.C.) – 2016–2017
- Igor Shkvyrin – (Pahang FA) – 1995
- Vokhid Shodiev – (Perak) – 2016
- Oleg Sinelobov – (Perlis FA) – 1993
- Pavel Smolyachenko – ATM FA – 2016–2017
- Farhod Tadjiyev – (T-Team FC) – 2015
- Lutfulla Turaev – (Felda United) – 2016, (Terengganu FC) – 2017
- **Nurillo Tukhtasinov** – **Terengganu FC** – 2023–

=== Vietnam ===
- Michal Nguyen – (Selangor F.C.) – 2019

== Africa – CAF ==
=== Algeria ===
- Zakaria Lounis – Kedah – 2023

=== Angola ===
- Aguinaldo – Sabah – 2019
- Titi Buengo – Penang FA – 2014
- (Portugal) Freddy – (Negeri Sembilan FA) – 2007
- Eldon Maquemba – UiTM FC – 2014

=== Burkina Faso ===
- Martin Kafando – Perak FA – 2014
- Romeo Kambou – (Sarawak FA) – 2005–2008
- Abdoulaye Traoré – (Perak FA) – 2006–2007

=== Burundi ===
- Sudi Abdallah – Kuching City – 2023

=== Cameroon ===
- Alain Akono – (Negeri Sembilan FC) – 2022
- Pierre Olivier Bakalag – DPMM FC – 2008
- Eric Bayemi – Felda United – 2008
- Viban Francis Bayong – (DPMM FC) – 2006–2007
- Christian Bekamenga – (Negeri Sembilan FA) – 2004–2006
- Didier Celestin Belibi – DPMM FC – 2008
- Yves Belle Belle – Malacca FA – 1998–1999
- Vincent Bikana – Terengganu FA – 2013–2016
- Albert Ebosse Bodjongo – Perak FA – 2012
- Dimitri Bodric – MISC-MIFA – 2017
- Richard Bohomo – (Kuala Muda Naza FC) – 2007–2008
- Makadji Boukar – Felda United – 2013
- Pierre Boya – Penang FA – 2013
- Guy Bwele – (Sarawak FA) – 2012–2013
- Martin Ekoule – Kuala Lumpur FA – 2015
- Joël Epalle – (Sarawak FA) – 2012–2013
- Fokim Fon Fondo – Johor FA – 2012
- Kamsi Joel – (Kuala Lumpur FA) – 2005
- Mbom Mbom Julien – UiTM FC – 2015
- Emmanuel Kenmogne – (Kelantan FA) – 2015
- Christian Kono – DPMM FC – 2008
- Eric Arsène Bayemi Maemble – (Felda United FC) – 2008
- Cedric Mbarga – DRB-Hicom F.C. – 2016
- Emile Mbouh – (Perlis FA) – 1995–1996, (Kuala Lumpur FA) – 1997, (Sabah FA) – 1999–2001
- Matthew Andongcho Mbuta – (DPMM FC) – 2006
- Moustapha Moctar – UiTM FC – 2016
- William Modibo – (Negeri Sembilan FA) – 2013
- Moudourou Moise – (Johor FC) – 2008–2009
- Francois Mpessa – (Telekom Melaka) – 2005–2006, (DPMM FC) – 2008–2009
- Alain Njoh Njoh Mpondo – (Telekom Melaka) – 2004–2005
- Basile Essa Mvondo – (Perak FA) – 2004
- Yannick N'Djeng – T-Team FC – 2017
- Ronald Ngah – Kedah – 2022
- Jean Black Ngody – (Perlis FA) – 2005–2006
- Jean Nyima – (Terengganu FA) – 1998
- Aloys Nyom Nyom – Sarawak FA – 2008
- Jean-Emmanuel Effa Owona – (Negeri Sembilan FA) – 2012, 2014, (Terengganu FA) – 2013
- David Pagbe – Penang FA – 2005–2007
- Kallé Soné – (Sarawak FA) – 2012, (Kuala Lumpur FA) – 2013, 2015
- Joel Tchami – SPA F.C. – 2013–2014
- Alexis Tibidi – Sabah FA – 1998
- Bernard Tchoutang – (Pahang FA) – 2006–2007

=== Cape Verde ===
- **Alvin Fortes** – **Selangor FC** – 2024–

=== Central African Republic ===
- Franklin Anzite – UiTM FC – 2016, PKNP FC – 2018, Selangor United – 2019
- David Manga – PDRM FC – 2019

=== Chad ===
- Karl Max Barthelemy – PKNP FC – 2018

=== Congo ===
- Ushindi Baraka – Sarawak FA – 2020
- Kevin Koubemba – KL City – 2022
- Ntambwe Papy – Sarawak FA – 2020
- Franklin Mata Sukami – Johor FA – 2007
- Jean-Clotaire Tsoumou-Madza – MPPJ FC – 2004–2005

=== DR Congo ===
- Metha Viblo Apingi – Protap F.C. – 2019, Harini F.C. – 2020
- Mendike Fukiani – Harini F.C. – 2020
- Chadrack Lukombe – Kelantan Darul Naim F.C. – 2024
- Nsumbu Mazuwa – Felda United – 2013
- Sammy Musemakweli – Harini F.C. – 2020
- Uzoma Victor – Klasiko F.C. – 2020
- Franklin MATA Sukami -- Honor Daru—2007

=== Egypt ===
- Sheriff Ahmed Mustafa – Shah Alam Antlers – 2017–2018
- Khaled Ragab – Pahang FA – 2004–2005
- Mohamed Shawky – (Kelantan FA) – 2014
- Eslam Zaky – Selangor United – 2019

=== Gabon ===
- Frederic Bulot – Felda United – 2020
- Saphou Lassy – Sabah FA – 1998
- Levy Madinda – Sabah – 2021, JDT II – 2022, Negeri Sembilan FC – 2023

=== Gambia ===
- Gassama Alfussainey – Kelantan United – 2020–2021
- Mamadou Danso – Kelantan – 2017, UiTM F.C. – 2018
- Abdou Jammeh – PKNS FC – 2017
- Nuha Marong – Kelantan FC – 2023
- Sanna Nyassi – Penang FA – 2017–2018

=== Guinea ===
- Mamadou Barry – Terengganu FC – 2014
- Mamadou Berete – Batu Dua F.C. – 2019
- Demba Camara – PJ City – 2020
- Oussame Camara – (Pahang FA) – 2004
- Ballamodou Conde – (Penang FA) – 1997–1998
- Abdou Jammeh – PKNS FC – 2017
- Mohamed Kann – Terengganu FA – 1997
- Boubacar Keita – Pahang FA – 2008
- Keita Mandjou – (Perak FA) – 2004–2007, (DPMM FC) – 2007–2008, (Kelantan FA) – 2013
- Seydou Sako – Kelantan United – 2019
- Mansa Sylla – Sarawak FA – 2008
- Morlaye Toure – Johor FA – 2005–2006

=== Guinea-Bissau ===
- Fernando Manuel Co – Sarawak FA – 2004
- Jose Embalo – Sabah – 2022
- Valdu Té – Kelantan Darul Naim F.C. – 2024

=== Ivory Coast ===
- Davy Claude Angan – Melaka United – 2019, KL Rovers – 2020
- Dao Bakary – Perlis FA – 2014, UiTM FC – 2015, 2018, Kuantan FA – 2016, PDRM FC – 2017
- Diarra Bakary – (Telekom Melaka) – 200x
- Noel Kipre – (Perak FA) – 1997–1998
- Dechi Marcel – UiTM FC – 2017–2018, Terengganu FC II – 2019–2020, Terengganu FC – 2021, Kedah – 2022, Kuching City – 2023
- Frederic Pooda – Sime Darby FC – 2015–2016, PDRM FA – 2016–2017
- Edward Koffi Quassy – (Telekom Melaka) – 200x
- **Kipré Tchétché** – Terengganu F.C. – 2017–19, 2022, Kedah FA – 2020–2021, KL City – 2023, **Kuching City F.C.** – 2024–
- Koh Traore – Sabah FA – 2013

=== Kenya ===
- Abdularazak Alwy – (Pahang FA) – 2007
- John Baraza – (PDRM FA) – 2006–2008
- Michael Baraza – (PDRM FA) – 2007–2008
- Hillary Echesa – (PDRM FA) – 2006–2008, (MP Muar) – 2012, (NS Betaria F.C.) – 2013
- Harrison Eric Muranda – (Negeri Sembilan FA) – 2007
- Bernard Mwalala – PDRM FA – 2006–2007
- Pascal Ochieng – Johor FC – 2012
- Lawrence Olum – Kedah FA – 2015

=== Lesotho ===
- Marko Ganasson – Sarawak FA – 2006

=== Liberia ===
- Joseph Amoah – Sabah FA – 2002
- Esaiah Pello Benson – Perlis FA – 2012–2013
- Buston Nagbe Browne – (Negeri Sembilan FA) – 2006
- Samuel Chebli – (Perak FA) – 1996–1997, (Terengganu FA) – 1998
- Preston Corporal – ATM FA – 2005–2008
- Teah Dennis Jr. – Sarawak FA – 2016
- Francis Doe – Terengganu FA – 2012, Selangor FA – 2013, 2017, Kelantan FA – 2014, Negeri Sembilan FA – 2015, Felda United – 2016, Pahang FA – 2018, Immigration F.C. – 2020
- Jerome Suku Doe – Sabah FA – 2014
- Alexander Freeman – (Kelantan FA) – 1995–1996, (Perlis FA) – 1997–1998, (Selangor FA) – 1999–2001
- (Switzerland) Patrick Gerhardt – (Sarawak FA) – 2015
- Sam Johnson – Sabah – 2021
- **Abu Kamara** – (**Kuching City**) – 2022–
- Sengbah Kennedy – Sime Darby FC – 2012
- Lamie T. Kiawu – (Sarawak FA) – 2000–2001
- Edmond Kingston – (Selangor FA) – 2004, (ATM FA) – 2004
- Zah Rahan Krangar – Felda United – 2014–2017
- Erick Weeks Lewis – Perak FA – 2016
- Marcus Macauley – PDRM FC – 2023
- James Mooney – ATM FA – 2008
- Keith Nah – Kedah FA – 2014–2015
- Nathaniel Naplah – Negeri Sembilan FA – 1995
- Isaac Pupo – Kelantan FA – 2015
- Amadaiya Rennie – UKM F.C. – 2020
- Varney Sando – Sime Darby FC – 2012–2014
- Mass Sarr, Jr. – (Selangor FA) – 2001–2004
- Frank Jean Seator – (Perak FA) – 2003–2005, (Selangor FA) – 2009–2010
- Josiah Seton – (Sabah FA) – 2002–2005, (Pahang FA) – 2005–2006
- **Kpah Sherman** – (MISC-MIFA FC) – 2017–2018, (PKNS FC) – 2019, (Kedah) – 2020–2021, (Terengganu FC) – 2022, (**Sri Pahang FC**) – 2023–
- Mulloh Matpioh Gateh Sikka – (Pahang FA) – 2004–2005
- Arcadia Toe – (Kelantan JPS FC) – 2004
- Edward Junior Wilson – Felda United – 2014–2015, Perlis FA – 2015–2016
- Patrick Wleh – Sime Darby FC – 2012, PKNS FC – 2013–2017, Selangor FA – 2016, PDRM FA – 2019, Sarawak United – 2020
- Charles Gaye Wright – Proton FC – 2008

=== Libya ===
- Eamon Zayed – Sabah FA – 2014–2015

=== Madagascar ===
- Dimitri Carlos Zozimar – Kelantan United – 2019, Batu Dua F.C. – 2019

=== Mali ===
- Makan Konate – T-Team – 2016–2017, Terengganu FC – 2021
- Souleymane Konate – PDRM FA – 2016–2017
- Modibo Konte – Kuala Lumpur FA – 2017, Perlis FA – 2017
- Abdoulaye Maïga – T-Team – 2015–2017
- Mamadou Samassa – T-Team – 2017
- Mamadou Samassa – Sri Pahang FC – 2022
- (Spain) Moussa Sidibé – JDT II – 2022
- Dramane Traore – PDRM FA – 2015, Kelantan – 2016

=== Mauritania ===
- (Guinea-Bissau) Dominique Da Sylva – (Terengganu F.C.) – 2020, (KL City) – 2021
- **Youssouf Wade** – **PT Athletic F.C.** – 2024–

=== Morocco ===
- Merzagua Abderrazak – (Penang FA) – 1996–2001
- Mohammed Akrane – (Perlis FA) – 1998
- Redouane Barkaoui – (Melaka TMFC) – 2005, (Pahang FA) – 2008
- Mohamed Borji – (Pahang FA) – 2013
- Abdel Hakim El-Bahloul – (DPMM FC) – 2007
- Tarik El-Janaby – (Pahang FA) – 2006–2007, (Kuantan FA) – 2015–2016
- Azour El-Mustafa – PDRM FA – 1998
- Mourad Faris – Perlis FA – 2014
- Adil Kouskous – Kelantan United – 2020
- Fidadi Mohamed – (Selangor FA) – 1998–2001
- Moncef Moaoui – Malacca FA – 1998
- Karim Rouani – Perak FA – 2013
- Hamid Termina – Sarawak FA – 2008
- Redouane Zerzouri – (UKM F.C.) – 2018
- Rachid Zmama – (MPPJ FC) – 2006

=== Namibia ===
- Lazarus Kaimbi – (Pahang FA) – 2019, (Kelantan FC) – 2020
- Paulus Shipanga – (Sabah FA) – 2006–2007
- **Petrus Shitembi** – (Sabah) – 2020, (Terengganu FC) – 2021–2022, (**Kuching City**) – 2023–

=== Niger ===
- Haruna Alhassan – (Kelantan FA) – 2004–2005
- Mohammed Muyei – (SKMK FC) – 2003–2005

=== Nigeria ===
Player	Club(s)	Years
Stephen Abarowei	NS Chempaka FC	1998
Umar Etudaye Abdulmajid	Langkawi City F.C.	2020
Abdulafees Abdulsalam	Shahzan Muda FC, Perak FA, ATM FA	2004–2007, 2014–2016
Aliyu Abubakar	Negeri Sembilan FC, Perak FC	2024– 2025/26
Azeez Arisekola Adam	PT Athletic F.C.	2024–
Atapa Kazeem Adeolu	DRB-Hicom F.C.	2014
Koforowola Hameed Adewumi	UiTM FC	2013
Olubunmi Adigun	Kedah FA	1992–1994
Sunday Afolabi	Perak FC	2022–
Uche Agba	PDRM FC, Melaka United, Sarawak United	2019–2023
Alex Agbo	PLUS FC	2007–2008
Prince Obus Aggreh	PDRM FC	2024
Binawari Williams Ajuwa	Pahang FA	2005
Ismahil Akinade	Kelantan FC, Kelantan United, Terengganu F.C.	2023–
Aguile Alex	Protap F.C.	2020
Jose Alex	Johor Bahru FA	2019
Tajudeen Osman Aliyou	Melaka FA	1997
Abu Bakar Sadiq Aliyu	Melaka FA	1997
Inerepamo Andrew Amukuro	Perak UPB FC, Kelantan FA	2005–2008
Austin Amutu	Kelantan FA, Pahang F.C.	2015, 2018
Benson Ejike Anih	Felda United	2007–2008
Abubakar Balarabe	Kuala Lumpur FA	1998
Obi Ikechukwu Charles	Sabah FA, UiTM FC, Sime Darby F.C.	2006–2016
Chukwu Nnabuike Chijioke	Ultimate F.C., Harini F.C., PDRM FC, Terengganu F.C.	2019–
Clifford Clarke	Shahzan Muda FC, Melaka FA	2005–2008
Bright Dike	Pahang FC	2017
Edward Dipreye	Terengganu FA	1994–1995
Prince Eboagwu	Sabah FA	2006–2007
Chidi Edeh	Kedah, Penang	2015, 2018
Vincent Ejike	Melaka FA	—
Julius Ejueyitsi	Negeri Sembilan FA	2007
Abdulrazak Ekpoki	Negeri Sembilan FA	2004
Okpe Solomon Ekunke	Shah Alam Antlers	2017
Njoku Emeka	Kuala Muda NAZA FC	2008
Aiyajunoni Emola	Johor FA	2007
Anicet Eyenga	Negeri Sembilan FA	2005
Uchenna Eze	MK Land FC, KL PLUS FC	2004–2007
Emeka Ezeugo	Pahang FA	1990
Udo Fortune	Negeri Sembilan FA	2008
David Ngan Gagbe	Penang NTFA FC, PDRM FA	2005
Jamil Garba	Klasiko F.C.	2019–2020
Glory Gaskie	PDRM FA	2004–2005
Sunday Matthew Idoko	Puchong Fuerza F.C.	2019
Emmanuel Ifeanyi	Terengganu FA	2008
Michael Ijezie	NS Betaria, Felcra FC, SPA FC, UKM F.C., Kuching City	2012–2023
Udensi Christopher Ikechukwu	Sabah FA	2005–2006
Onyema Ikechukwu	Kuala Lumpur FA	2002
Ekene Ikenwa	Kuala Muda Naza FC	2008–2009
Igwe Iroha	Shahzan Muda FC	2005–2006
Ogunboye Iyanu	Sungai Ara F.C., DRB-Hicom F.C., Kuala Lumpur FA	2013–2015
O.K. John	PDRM FA, UiTM FC	2015, 2017
Stephen Keshi	Perlis FA	1997–1998
Abdul Kole	Perlis FA	1997
Abu Bakar Balarade Mallam	Kuala Lumpur FA	1998
Yusuf Mangut	Terengganu FA	1998
Ranti Martins	Penang FA	2016
Thankgod Michael	Immigration F.C.	2024–
Mohamed Mohamed	Melaka FA	1997
James Ngaulala-Arffrin	Sarawak FA	1998–1999
Peter Nieketien	Kedah FA, Terengganu FA	1992–1995
David Njoku	Sabah FA	2008
Jacob Njoku	Kelantan United F.C., Sabah	2022–2023
Prince Nnake	Sabah FA	2016
Dickson Nwakaeme	Kelantan FA, Pahang FA	2013–2020
Obinna Nwaneri	Kelantan FA, ATM FA	2012–2015
Onyekachi Nwoha	Kelantan FA, Sabah FA	2012–2013
Junior Obagbemiro	Sabah FA	2006
Charles Obi	Sabah FA, UiTM FC, Sime Darby F.C.	2006–2016
Faith Friday Obilor	PDRM FC	2024–
Christian Obiozor	Perak FC	2023
Felix Odili	Kelantan FC	2020
Ajah Ogechukwu	Perak FA	1996
Aguama Stanley Ogochukwu	Proton FC	2007–2008
Victor Ogunsanya	Perlis FA, Kuala Lumpur FA	199x–1998
Boniface Okafor	Penang FA	199x
James Okwuosa	PDRM FC, Kuching City F.C.	2023–
Talada Oladeimeji	Proton FC	2007–2008
Daddy Olucheh	Sabah FA	2005–2006
Ifedayo Olusegun	Felda, Melaka, Selangor, Kedah, PDRM FC	2017–
MacPherlin Dudu Omagbemi	Penang FA	2005
David Oniya	T-Team F.C.	2014–2015
John Onwedegu	Terengganu FA	1995–1997
Cajetan Ndubuisi Oparaugo	Negeri Sembilan FA	2004
Waheed Oseni	UKM F.C.	2018
Chidi Osuchukwu	PDRM FC	2024–
Mast Opuenu Oyanabo	PDRM FA	1998
Michael Onyekachi Ozor	Melaka F.C.	2024–
Ovie Precious	Batu Dua F.C.	2019
Bassey Richard	Negeri Sembilan FA	2005–2006
Abdul Lateef Seriki	Negeri Sembilan FA	2005–2006
Akande Adejumo Smith	Johor FA	2008
Chidubem Aniamalu Stephen	Immigration F.C.	2020
Abdul Sule	Johor FA	2007–2008
Aremu Timothy	PDRM FC	2024–
Okereke Timothy	UiTM FC	2018
Peter Uademebuo	Jenderata F.C.	2005
Nduka Ugbade	Perak FA	1999–2002
Ugo Ukah	Selangor F.C., Penang	2016–2018
Akanni-Sunday Wasiu	UiTM FC, Terengganu II, UKM F.C.	2017–2020
Yahaya Yakubu	Kedah FA	2005
Lucky Ogu	AXIS 02 FC, Klasiko FC, Teleflow FC	2016–2021

=== Rwanda ===
- Atuheire Kipson – UKM F.C. – 2018
- Jimmy Mulisa – T-Team FC – 2014

=== Senegal ===
- Moustapha Dabo – Terengganu FC – 2014
- Pape Cire Dia – Felda United – 2012
- Pape Diakite – Terengganu FC – 2022
- Babacar Diallo – Terengganu FC – 2020
- Kane Mamadou Maryam Diallo – (Kedah FA) – 1996–1998
- Mamadou Diallo – (Pahang FA) – 2004–2005
- Matar Diop – (Kedah FA) – 2002
- El Hadji Diouf – (Sabah FA) – 2015
- Racine Diouf – Johor FC – 2006
- Abdoulaye Faye – Sabah FA – 2014–2015
- Baptiste Faye – KT Rovers F.C. – 2020
- **Jacque Faye** – Ultimate F.C. – 2019, Melawati F.C. – 2020, PDRM FC – 2023, **Negeri Sembilan FC** – 2024–
- Morgaro Gomis – (Kelantan FA) – 2016–2018, (Kelantan United) – 2023
- Robert Lopez Mendy – UiTM FC – 2019
- Mohamed Moustapha N'diaye – (Kelantan FA) – 2007–2008
- Kalidou Yero – PKNP FC – 2019

=== Seychelles ===
- (England) Chris Dawson – Kuala Lumpur FA – 2002

=== Sierra Leone ===
- Mahmadu Alphajor Bah – Perlis FA – 2012
- Lamine Conteh – (Perlis FA) – 2003–2006, 2012, (Negeri Sembilan FA) – 2008
- Alhaji Kamara – (Johor Darul Ta'zim F.C.) – 2015
- Abu Kanu – Penang FA – 1997
- Jerome Katende – USM FC – 2012
- Thomas Koroma – (Negeri Sembilan FC) – 2019
- Henry Lewis – (Perlis FA) – 2012
- Mohamed Sillah – Terengganu FA – 2004

=== South Africa ===
- Junaid Hartley – (Sarawak FA) – 2006–2007
- Philani Kubheka – (Negeri Sembilan FA) – 2014
- Dumisa Ngobe – (Sabah FA) – 2006–2008
- **Alan Robertson** – (**Kedah F.C.**) – 2023–
- Mark Williams – Brunei FA – 2003
- Mandla Zwane – (Sarawak FA) – 1996, (Selangor FA) – 1997

=== South Sudan ===
- Bernard Agele – UiTM FC – 2019
- Kenny Athiu – (Sri Pahang FC) – 2021

=== Sudan ===
- Ahmed Al-Sayed – Sabah FA – 2005

=== Tanzania ===
- Abdi Kassim – UiTM FC – 2014–2015

=== Togo ===
- Kossi Adetu – (Negeri Sembilan FC) – 2022
- Raphaël Patron Akakpo – (Brunei FA) – 1997–1999, 2002, (Terengganu FA) – 2003
- Togaba Kontiwa Komlan – Sime Darby FC – 2013
- Francis Koné – KL City – 2020, Negeri Sembilan FC – 2021, Sarawak United – 2022
- Alfa Potowabawi – (Terengganu FA) – 2003–2006

=== Tunisia ===
- Alaeddine Bouslimi – Kelantan FC – 2018
- Helmi Loussaief – PKNS FC – 2012–2013

=== Uganda ===
- Denis Amadire – Sarawak FA – 2020
- Arbade Bironze – (Pahang FA) – 2006–2007
- Omar Hitimana – Sarawak FA – 2020
- Edrisar Kaye – USM FC – 2012, PDRM FC – 2013, PBAPP FC – 2014
- Ochaya Silvus Luis – PBAPP FC – 2014
- Vino Ramazani – Protap F.C. – 2019

=== Zambia ===
- Cosmas Banda – Sarawak FA – 2005–2006, Perlis FA – 2006–2007
- Chanda Bwalya – (Terengganu FA) – 2004
- Linos Chalwe – Perlis FA – 2003
- Phillimon Chepita – (Perlis FA) – 2003–2008, (PKNS FC) – 2012
- Evans Chisulo – (Selangor FA) – 2008
- Kalande Kabamba – Perlis FA – 2005–2006
- Gift Kampamba – Sabah FA – 2005–2007
- Kabwe Kamuzati – (Perlis FA) – 2006
- Francis Kasonde – (Sabah FA) – 2017–2018
- Francis Kombe – Perlis FA – 2006–2007
- John Lungu – Sabah FA – 1998
- Kelvin Muzungu – (Perlis FA) – 2003
- Noel Rodwell Mwandila – (Negeri Sembilan FA) – 2006
- Boston Mwanza – Perlis FA – 2007–2008
- Owen Mwendabai – (Perlis FA) – 2005
- Josphat Nkhoma – Felda United – 2008
- Chaswe Nsofwa – (Melaka TMFC) – 2005–2007
- Zachariah Simukonda – (Perlis FA) – 2005–2007, (T–Team FC) – 2012
- Masauso Tembo – Johor FA – 2006–2007
- Emmanuel Zulu – (Perak FA) – 2003–2007

=== Zimbabwe ===
- Neathan Gibson – (Sarawak FA) – 1995–1996
- Victor Kamhuka – PDRM FC – 2021
- Newton Ben Katanha – (MPPJ FC) – 2004–2005

== Europe – UEFA ==
=== Albania ===
- Xhevahir Sukaj – Perak FA – 2016

=== Andorra ===
- Marc Vales – Kedah – 2022

=== Armenia ===
- Karen Harutyunyan – Terengganu FA – 2016

=== Azerbaijan ===
- **Eddy Israfilov** – **Johor Darul Ta'zim FC** – 2024–

=== Belarus ===
- Yahor Zubovich – Melaka United – 2018

=== Belgium ===
- Oliver Le Franco – Perlis FA – 1997
- Jason Van Achteren – Perlis United F.C. – 2020

=== Bosnia and Herzegovina ===
- Alen Bajkusa – Penang FA – 1992–1993
- Elvis Ćorić – (PKNS FC) – 2005–2006
- Dalibor Dragic – Johor Bahru City FC – 2012
- Anto Grabo – Kuala Lumpur FA – 1990–1992
- (Turkey) Damir Ibric – T-Team FC – 2014
- Tarik Isic – Perak FA II – 2020
- Veselin Kovačević – Sabah FA – 1995–1998
- **Jovan Motika** – **KL City** – 2024–
- Ratko Ninkovic – Penang FA – 1992–1993
- Bojan Petrić – T-Team FC – 2011–2012
- Muamer Salibašić – (Sarawak) – 2013–2015, 2019–2020, (Sabah) – 2016
- Esad Sedjić – (Perak FA) – 1992–1993, (Negeri Sembilan FA) – 1993–1994
- Milomir Šešlija – Kuala Lumpur FA – 1992–1993, Sabah FA – 1993–1998
- Zelimir Terkes – Perak FA – 2014

=== Bulgaria ===
- Miroslav Baichev – Terengganu FA – 1993
- (Hong Kong) Dimitre Kalkanov – Kelantan FA – 1993, Selangor FA – 1994
- Vladislav Mirchev – Perak FA – 2017
- Lyuben Nikolov – PKNP FC – 2018
- Atanas Pashev – Kuala Lumpur FA – 1993

=== Croatia ===
- Mladen Alajbeg – DPMM FC – 2007
- Ivan Babic – Sarawak – 2013, Negeri Sembilan FA – 2014, DRB-Hicom – 2015
- Boško Balaban – Selangor FA – 2012
- Dominik Balić – Melaka United – 2019, Kelantan United – 2023
- Ervin Boban – Johor – 1989–1995
- Matej Bogdanovic – UPB-MyTeam FC – 2007–2008
- Mate Borovac – Johor FA – 1989–1990
- Tomislav Busic – T-Team FC – 2015–2016
- Igor Cerina – Sabah FA – 2016–2018
- Mijo Dadić – MK Land FC – 2004–2005, UPB MyTeam FC – 2006–2008, Kelantan FA – 2012–2013
- Marco Drakovic – Kelantan FA – 1993
- Joško Farac – Perak FA – 2002
- Vedran Gerc – Kedah FA – 2012
- Alen Guć – Putrajaya SPA F.C. – 2014
- Josip Ivancic – Sabah – 2021
- **Nikola Jambor** – **Selangor FC** – 2024–
- Jure Jeramaz – Johor FA – 1989–1990, Malacca FA – 1993
- Lek Kcira – Kelantan – 2013
- Rene Komar – DPMM FC – 2005–2007, 2008
- Daniel Kovačević – PKNS FC – 2005–2006
- Vedran Kukoč – Perak FA – 2005–2007
- Ivica Kulašević – Selangor FA – 2002–2003
- **Ivan Mamut** – **Terengganu FC** – 2023–
- Mario Mijatović
- Marin Mikac – MK Land FC – 2004–2005, UPB-MyTeam FC – 2006–2007
- Josip Milardovic – T-Team FC – 2015
- Dejan Miljanić – UPB-MyTeam FC – 2006–2007
- Vedran Muratovic – Sarawak FA – 2012
- Darko Novačić – Selangor FA – 2003–2004
- Branko Panic – Sabah FA – 2005–2006
- Goran Paulic – Melaka FA – 1993
- Goran Perak – Sime Darby – 2013
- Dominik Picak – UiTM FC – 2021
- **Marin Pilj** – **Terengganu FC** – 2024–
- Stipe Plazibat – Perak FC – 2022
- Predrag Pocuca – Sabah – 2014
- Karlo Primorac – Sime Darby – 2013, (PKNS) – 2014–2015
- Domagoj Pusic – Terengganu FC – 2023
- Miljan Radovic – UPB-MyTeam FC – 200x
- Sandro Radun – Kelantan FA – 1991, 1994
- Mateo Roskam – Sime Darby – 2014, Sarawak FA – 2017–18, (UKM F.C.) – 2019
- Marko Simic – Negeri Sembilan FC – 2017, Melaka United – 2017
- Zdravko Šimić – Sabah FA – 2005
- Joško Španjić – Singapore FA – 1989
- Igor Tolić – PKNS FC – 2005–2006
- Srdan Vidakovic – Kuantan – 2016
- Zlatko Vidan – Perak FA – 1997
- Goran Vujanović – DPMM FC – 2006
- **Matko Zirdum** – KL City – 2023, **Negeri Sembilan FC** – 2024–

=== Czech Republic ===
- Kresimir Bozic – Selangor FA – 1989
- Miroslav Cater – PDRM FA – 1990
- Miroslav Denk – Sabah FA – 1990
- Milan Hanko – Negeri Sembilan FA – 1992
- Jan Janostak – Kedah FA – 1994–1996
- Miroslav Janů – Sabah FA – 1990–1992
- **Michal Jeřábek** – **Kelantan Darul Naim F.C.** – 2024–
- Pavel Korejcik – Selangor FA – 1990–1991
- Peter Kummer – PDRM FA – 1990
- Vitezslav Mooc – Negeri Sembilan FA – 2007
- Jan Necas – Kelantan FA – 2007–2008
- Jaroslav Netolička – Sabah FA – 1990–1993
- Karel Stromsik – Selangor FA – 1989–1991
- Vitezslav Tuma – Sabah FA – 1992
- Martin Vana – ATM FA – 1992, Perak FA – 1993
- Michal Vana – Sabah FA – 1991, Singapore FA – 1992–1994

=== Denmark ===
- Thomas Abel – Kedah FA – 2003–2004
- Ken Ilsø – Kedah – 2017, Penang – 2018
- Philip Lund – DRB-Hicom – 2016
- Ulrik Noergaard – Perak UPB FC – 2004–2005

=== England ===
- Brandon Adams – Perlis FA – 2017
- Jon Bass – Pahang FA – 2005
- Paul Bastock – Sabah FA – 1989
- Tony Cottee – Selangor FA – 1996–1997
- Ian Gray – Brunei – 1994
- Jack Hindle – Kelantan FC – 2021
- Carl Hoddle – Negeri Sembilan FA – 1986
- Chris Kiwomya – Selangor FA – 1997
- Charlie Machell – Perak FC – 2021
- Gareth Naven – Sarawak FA – 1995
- Richard Offiong – Johor FA – 2012
- Jeff Parker – Brunei – 1993
- Jamie Phoenix – Sabah FA – 2007–2008
- David Rocastle – Sabah FA – 1999
- James Rodwell – Sabah FA – 1989
- Timothy Slack – Malacca FA – 1989
- Alex Smith – Negeri Sembilan Matrix – 2016, JDT II – 2017
- Steven Paul Stott – Kuala Lumpur FA – 1996
- Nicky Walsh – Negeri Sembilan FA – 1986

=== France ===
- Jonathan Behe – Sabah FA – 2017, Negeri Sembilan FC – 2017–2018
- Sofiane Choubani – Sabah FA – 2017
- Ousmane Fane – UiTM FC – 2020, 2021–2022, Penang – 2023
- Guy Gnabouyou – Sabah – 2020
- Herold Goulon – Pahang FA – 2019–2021, Negeri Sembilan FC – 2022–2023
- Ghislain Guessan – Perak FC – 2021
- Goran Jerkovic – Negeri Sembilan FC – 2016–2017
- David Le Bras – Kelantan FA – 2008
- **Enzo Lombardo** – **Johor Darul Ta'zim FC** – 2024–
- Johan Martial – Sri Pahang FC – 2022
- Philippe N'Dioro – Kedah FA – 1995
- Victor Nirennold – UiTM FC – 2020–2021
- Kevin Osei – Perlis FA – 2019, UKM F.C. – 2020
- Sacha Petshi – Perak FA II – 2020
- Karim Rouani – Perak – 2013
- Abdulfatah Safi – Kedah FA – 2012, Sabah FA – 2013
- L'Imam Seydi – Kelantan FC – 2017, 2019, MISC-MIFA – 2018, Batu Dua F.C. – 2019
- Steven Thicot – Melaka United – 2018

=== Georgia ===
- Irakli Kokhreidze – Sabah FA – 2007–2008

=== Germany ===
- Sven Backhaus – Selangor FA – 1996
- (East Germany) Martin Busse – Terengganu FA – 1990–1991
- Hendrik Helmke – Sabah FA – 2012
- Tim Heubach – Selangor F.C. – 2021
- Thomas Hoßmang – Terengganu FA – 1990–1991
- Manuel Konrad – Selangor FC – 2021
- Jan Kuchling – Johor FC – 2005
- Lorenz Menge – Malacca FA, Telekom Melaka FC – 1991–1992
- (East Germany) Frank Pastor – Terengganu FA – 1990–1991
- Lutz Pfannenstiel – Penang FA – 1993–1994
- Markus Steinhauer – Malacca FA, Telekom Melaka FC – 1991–1992

=== Greece ===
- Christos Intzidis – Kelantan FC – 2021
- **Haris Stamboulidis** – **Sabah** – 2024–

=== Hungary ===
- Istvan Borsos – Pahang FA – 1997
- Zsolt Bucs – Selangor FA – 1993–1994, Pahang FA – 1997
- Péter Disztl – Selangor FA – 1993
- Jozsef Duro – Pahang FA – 1998
- Gyorgy Fabulya – Pahang FA – 1991–1992
- Gábor Gyepes – Sarawak – 2014
- Tamás Koltai – Johor FC – 2004–2005
- Jozsef Kovacs – Terengganu FA – 1998
- Péter Kovács – Johor FC – 2005
- János Krecska – Perak FA – 1997–1998
- Laszlo Repasi – Perak FA – 1997, 1998
- Gyorgy Takacs – Perak FA – 1998
- Frigyes Tuboly – Johor FA – 1998
- Denes Vaczi – Pahang FA – 1997
- Péter Vörös – Johor FC – 2005

=== Ireland ===
- Caleb Folan – T-Team – 2013
- Paul McNally – Brunei – 1993
- Billy Mehmet – Kedah – 2013–2014, Sarawak – 2015
- Abdeen Temitope – Penang – 2023

=== Italy ===
- **Sebastian Avanzini** – KL City – 2023, **Negeri Sembilan F.C.** – 2024–
- Simone Del Nero – Johor Darul Ta'zim FC – 2013
- Nicolao Dumitru – Johor Darul Ta'zim FC – 2024
- (Argentina) Fernando Forestieri – Johor Darul Ta'zim FC – 2022–2024
- Davide Grassi – Sarawak – 2016
- Raffaele Simone Quintieri – SPA F.C. – 2015
- Paolo Tirinnanzi – Proton FC – 2013

=== Kazakhstan ===
- Khasan Abdukarimov – ATM FA – 2016
- Berik Argimbaev – Perlis FA – 1992
- Boris Formenkov – ATM FA – 2016
- Gies Irisbekov – ATM FA – 2016
- Bolat Raishkanov – Perlis FA – 1992

=== Kosovo ===
- Bajram Nebihi – Selangor FC II – 2020
- Faton Toski – Perak FA – 2017

=== Latvia ===
- Ritus Krjauklis – PKNP FC – 2017–2018
- Renars Rode – Negeri Sembilan FC – 2018

=== Macedonia ===
- Baže Ilijoski – (Kelantan) – 2016
- Nikolce Klečkarovski – (Pahang) – 2013
- Jasmin Mecinovic – Melaka United – 2017
- Risto Mitrevski – Sabah – 2021
- Zlatko Nastevski – (Kedah FA) – 1993–1994

=== Malta ===
- (Nigeria) Alfred Effiong – Negeri Sembilan FA – 2004

=== Montenegro ===
- Balša Božović – (Melaka) – 2016
- Ivan Fatić – (Sarawak) – 2015
- Zarko Korac – Kuantan FA – 2018, UiTM FC – 2019
- Danko Kovacevic – Selangor United – 2018–2019
- Darko Markovic – Melaka United – 2018–2019, Kuala Lumpur FA – 2019
- Bogdan Milic – Terengganu FA – 2016
- Stefan Nikolic – Melaka United – 2021
- Milan Purović – (Perak) – 2014, (Kuantan) – 2015
- Milos Raickovic – Sarawak FA – 2017–2018
- **Argzim Redžović** – PDRM FC – 2018–2019, **Terengganu FC** – 2020–
- Benjamin Redzovic – PDRM FC – 2019
- **Adrijan Rudovic** – **KL City** – 2024–
- Ilija Spasojević – (Melaka) – 2016–2017
- Igor Zonjic – Terengganu FC – 2018–2019

=== Netherlands ===
- Luthey Beenen – Malacca FA – 1990–1992
- George Boateng – T-Team – 2013
- Sylvano Comvalius – Kuala Lumpur FA – 2019
- Pascal Heije – Negeri Sembilan FA –2007
- Ronald Hikspoors – Sarawak – 2015
- Andreas Sebastian Romano – UPB-MyTeam FC – 2007–2008
- **Matthew Steenvoorden** – **Terengganu FC** – 2024–
- Marlon Ricardo van der Sander – Terengganu – 1989, 1991–1992, PDRM FA – 1993
- Rudy Hank Veveer – Malacca FA – 1990
- Vincent Weijl – PKNP FC – 2017

=== Northern Ireland ===
- Norman Kelly – Brunei – 1993

=== Poland ===
- Dariusz Dudała – Kelantan FA – 1992
- Wojciech Jagoda – Melaka FA – 1993
- Grzegorz Kowalski – Kelantan FA – 1992–1993
- Arkadiusz Żarczyński – Sabah FA – 2007

=== Portugal ===
- Alfredo Bóia – Sarawak FA – 2007
- Jaime Bragança – PDRM – 2015
- **Telmo Castanheira** – **Sabah** – 2023–
- Fabio Ferreira – PKNS FC – 2017
- Francisco Geraldes – JDT FC – 2024
- Tiago Gomes – Melaka – 2018

=== Romania ===
- Victoraș Astafei – Selangor FA – 2017
- Lonca Lucian Dorin – Kelantan TNB FC – 2005–2006
- Cristian Fedor – Penang FA – 2004
- Cristian Mustaca – Selangor FA – 1996, Penang FA – 1997
- Georgian Mugurel Stamate – Melawati F.C. – 2019
- Alexandru Tudose – Melaka United – 2016, Kuantan FA – 2018, UKM F.C. – 2018
- Petrișor Voinea – PDRM FA – 2018

=== Russia ===
- Rod Dyachenko – SPA F.C. – 2015
- Aleksandr Fedorov – Perlis FA – 1994–1995
- Roman Khagba – Malacca FA – 1994–1995
- Boris Kochkin – Pahang FA – 2012, PBAPP – 2014
- Sergei Ledovskikh – Sabah FA – 1994, Perlis FA – 1995
- Vyacheslav Melnikov – Pahang FA – 1998, 2002, Penang FA – 2004–2005
- Fail Nizamovich – Kelantan FA – 1996
- Boris Ovcin – Penang FA – 2003–2004
- Oleg Podroujko – Melaka FA – 1994
- Eduard Sakhnevich – Pahang FA – 2012
- Dmitri Sychev – Negeri Sembilan FA – 2016
- Gennadiy Timofeev – Melaka FA – 1995–1996

=== Scotland ===
- Brian Bothwell – Brunei FA – 1995–1999, 2003–2004
- James Duffy – PDRM FA – 1994
- John Hunter – Sarawak FA – 1991–1995
- Barry McCorriston – PDRM FA – 1994
- Martin Tierney – PDRM FA – 1994, Penang FA – 1995

=== Serbia ===
- Ljubo Baranin – Kuantan – 2016–2017, Batu Dua FC – 2019
- Peter Bazic – Penang FA – 2006
- Saša Branežac – Petaling Jaya City – 2004, Penang – 2006, UPB-Myteam FC – 2008
- Bojan Ciger – Kedah – 2023
- **Aleksandar Cvetkovic** – **Sri Pahang FC** – 2024–
- Ivan Djokovic – PDRM FA – 2008
- Dalibor Dragić – Sabah – 2008, Johor Bahru City – 2012
- Ivan Dragicevic – Sime Darby FC – 2015
- **Miloš Gordić** – **Kedah Darul Aman** – 2024–
- Anto Grabo – Kuala Lumpur FA – 1992
- Altin Grbovic – Sabah FA – 2014
- Milorad Janjus – Sarawak FA – 2014
- Ivan Jerkovic – PDRM FA – 2007–2008
- Mihailo Jovanovic – Kuching City – 2023–
- Juraj Kuhajdik – Kuala Lumpur FA – 2013
- Nebojsa Marinkovic – Sarawak FA – 2018
- Bojan Miladinović – Felda United – 2015
- **Luka Milunovic** – Sabah – 2019, **Perak FC** – 2023–
- Zoran Nikolić – Kuala Lumpur FA – 1991–1993
- Perica Ognjenović – Selangor FA – 2006
- Vladislav Palsa – Kuala Lumpur FA – 2013
- Rodoljub Paunovic – Sabah – 2017, 2020
- Marko Perovic – Sime Darby FC – 2015
- Lazar Popović – Perak FA – 2011–2012
- Nikola Raspopovic – Felda United – 2020
- **Lazar Sajcic** – **Kuala Lumpur FA** – 2024–
- Dragisa Stojanovic – Penang FA – 1992–1993
- Nemanja Vidakovic – Sime Darby FC – 2015
- Nemanja Vidic – Negeri Sembilan FC – 2017
- Stefan Vukmirovic – Kuantan FA – 2017

=== Slovakia ===
- Martin Adamec – Kelantan FA – 2003
- Martin Adamec – PDRM FC – 2022
- Rastislav Belicak – Terengganu FA – 2004–2005
- Miroslav Bozik – Negeri Sembilan FA – 1990–1993
- Robert Bozik – Negeri Sembilan FA – 1991–1994
- Roman Chmelo – PKNS FC – 2003–2007, 2013
- Tomáš Chovanec – Betaria – 2013
- Peter Chrappan – Selangor – 2013
- Ludovit Dekany – PKNS FC – 2004–2005
- Marian Farbak – Negeri Sembilan FA – 2012
- Martin Filipak – Kuala Lumpur FA – 2003
- Marcel Horký – MK Land FC – 2005
- Lubomir Horochonic – Kuala Lumpur FA – 2003
- Miroslav Hrdina – Selangor FA – 2004
- Marián Juhás – Perak FA – 2005, Negeri Sembilan FA – 2007–2008
- Jozef Kaplan – Negeri Sembilan FA – 2014
- Michal Kubala – Perak FA – 2011–2012, Selangor – 2012–2013
- Juraj Kuhajdík – Kuala Lumpur – 2013
- Milos Lacny – PDRM FC – 2022
- Marcel Palic – PKNS FC – 2004–2005
- Vladislav Palša – Kuala Lumpur – 2013
- Richard Privitzer – Malacca FA – 2006–2007
- Ján Šafranko – Penang FA – 2005–2006
- Milan Strelec – Public Bank FC – 2003–2005
- Tibor Szaban – Kedah FA – 1992–1995
- Miroslav Toth – Selangor FA – 2005–2006
- Marian Valach – Negeri Sembilan FA – 1990–1992, 1993–1994, Terengganu FA – 1992–1993
- Patrik Volf – Malacca FA – 2006–2007
- Ivan Ziga – MK Land FC – 2003–2004, Public Bank FC – 2004–2005, Malacca FA – 2005–06, Sarawak FA – 2006

=== Slovenia ===
- Emir Dzafič – (Malacca FA) – 2001–2004
- Nejc Potokar – (Pahang) – 2016
- Dalibor Volaš – (Pahang) – 2016

=== Spain ===
- Mario Arques – Kelantan FC – 2021, 2023, PDRM FC – 2023
- José Carrasco – Johor Darul Takzim II – 2013–2014
- **Cifu** – Kelantan FC – 2023, **Sabah** – 2023–
- Alfonso de la Cruz – Selangor FC – 2018
- Youssef Ezzejjari – Negeri Sembilan FC – 2023
- José Franco Gómez – Kedah – 2013–2014
- Daniel Guiza – JDT – 2013
- **Jesé** – **Johor Darul Ta'zim FC** – 2024–
- Mika – Negeri Sembilan FC – 2024
- **Juan Muniz** – **JDT** – 2023–
- Aaron Niguez – JDT – 2019
- Braulio Nóbrega – Johor Darul Takzim II – 2013
- Juan Manuel Rodriguez Olsson – Negeri Sembilan FA − 1990
- Fernando Rodriguez – Kedah – 2019, JDT II – 2020–2022
- Rufino Segovia – Selangor FA – 2017–2020
- **Iker Undabarrena** – **Johor Darul Ta'zim FC** – 2024–
- Carlos Rodriguez Villalba – Penang FA – 1997
- **Andoni Zubiaurre** – **Johor Darul Ta'zim FC** – 2024–

=== Sweden ===
- Eric Peter Amsler – (Kedah FA) – 1989
- Labinot Harbuzi – (Melaka United) – 2016

=== Switzerland ===
- Oliver Buff – Selangor FC – 2021
- Martin Carviezel – Malacca FA – 1990
- Beat Zimmerman – Penang FA – 1989

=== Ukraine ===
- **Mykola Ahapov** – **Sri Pahang FC** – 2024–
- Serhiy Andryeyev – Terengganu FC II – 2019
- Yevhen Bokhashvili – Sri Pahang FC – 2021

=== Wales ===
- Jeff Hopkins – Selangor – 1997–1998
- Rhys Weston – Sabah – 2012–2013

=== Yugoslavia ===
- Srdjan Delibasic – Negeri Sembilan FA – 1990
- Marko Kraljević – Kelantan 1991–1993
- Miladin Kuč – Kuala Lumpur FA – 1991
- Zoran Ljubicic – Penang FA – 1991
- Boris Lucic – Singapore FA – 1989
- Miroslav Nikolic – Kelantan FA – 1991
- Bratislav Rinčić – Kedah FA – 1989–1990
- Goran Stanković – Kedah FA – 1990
- Ilich Vladimir – Kedah FA – 1990

== North America, Central America & Caribbean – CONCACAF ==
=== Canada ===
- Earl Cochrane – Penang – 1996
- Issey Nakajima-Farran – Terengganu – 2015–2017, Pahang – 2018
- **Albert Kang** — **Kelantan TRW** — 2025–

=== Curaçao ===
- Brutil Hosé – Sarawak FA – 2006

=== El Salvador ===
- Nelson Bonilla – Terengganu FC – 2024–2025

=== Grenada ===
- Antonio German – Selangor F.C. – 2019, PDRM FC – 2020

=== Guadeloupe ===
- Mickael Antoine-Curier – Felda United – 2012
- Mickael Nicoise – PKNS FC – 2012, SPA F.C. – 2014
- Eddy Viator – Felda United – 2012, SPA F.C. – 2013–2014

=== Guyana ===
- Keanu Marsh-Brown – Kuching City – 2022, 2024

=== Haiti ===
- Jean Alexandre – Negeri Sembilan FC – 2014–2015
- Sylvain Anega – KL PLUS FC – 2007–2008
- Kervens Belfort – Kelantan FC – 2022
- Andrew Jean-Baptiste – Terengganu FC II – 2018
- Fabrice Noel – ATM FA – 2014, Kuantan FA – 2015
- Sony Norde – Melaka United – 2020–2022, Terengganu FC – 2023, Kedah Darul Aman – 2024–2025
- Leonel Saint-Preux – Felda United – 2013
- Sebastien Thuriere – Terengganu FC II – 2018, Penang – 2019

=== Honduras ===
- Jerry Palacios – ATM FA – 2015

=== Jamaica ===
- Teafore Bennett – Pahang – 2006–2007
- Kevin Lamey – (Kuala Lumpur) – 2006–2007, Pahang – 2007
- Scott Alistair Lawson – Penang F.C. – 2008
- Horace James – Perak F.C. – 2015
- Damion Stewart – Pahang – 2013–2015, Perlis – 2017

=== Martinique ===
- Harry Novillo – JDT – 2018

=== Puerto Rico ===
- Hector Ramos – Sabah – 2018, 2020

=== Saint Kitts and Nevis ===
- Keith Gumbs – Sabah – 2003–2004
- Ian Lake – Sabah – 2004

=== Saint Vincent and the Grenadines ===
- Cornelius Huggins – Kedah – 2004–2008
- Marlon James – MK Land FC – 2004–2005, Kedah – 2006–2008, ATM FA – 2012–2013
- Shandel Samuel – Kedah – 2005, Negeri Sembilan FC – 2006

=== Trinidad and Tobago ===
- Kordell Samuel – PDRM F.C. – 2012–2013

=== United States of America ===
- Ali Deeb – Perlis United F.C. – 2020
- Andy Lorei – Shah Alam Antlers – 2016–2017
- Kyrian Nwabueze – KL City – 2021

== South America – CONMEBOL ==
=== Argentina ===
- Alan Aciar – MISC-MIFA – 2017
- Jonathan Acosta – PKNS FC – 2018
- Pablo Aimar – Johor Darul Takzim – 2014
- Diego Alberto Albertini – Kelantan FA – 2006–2007
- Juan Manuel Arostegui – MPPJ FC – 2003–2005, Armed Forces – 2013–2014
- Martin Carlos Dell Avanzatto – KL PLUS FC – 2006–2007
- Jeronimo Barrales – JDT II – 2017
- Jonatan Bauman – Kedah – 2019
- Santiago Bianchi – Felda United FC – 2012
- Julian Bottaro – Penang – 2019, UKM F.C. – 2020
- **Stefano Brundo** – **Sri Pahang FC** – 2023–
- Alex Daniel Cabrera – Penang FA – 2007–2008
- Gonzalo Cabrera – JDT – 2017–2021
- Luis Ignacio Cabrera – JDT II – 2020–2021
- Lucas Cano – Felda United – 2017
- Claudio Canoso – Perlis FA – 1993
- Hector Federico Carballo – Kuala Lumpur FA – 2005
- Julio Hector Ceballos – Negeri Sembilan FA – 1997
- Gaston Cellerino – Felda United – 2017
- Diego Rubén Cepeda – Selangor FA – 2004
- Gustavo Roberto Chena – Perlis FA – 2008–2009
- Juan Marcelo Cirelli – Johor FC – 2005–2006, Kuala Lumpur FA – 2007–2008
- Juan Manuel Cobelli – PKNS − 2016
- Raul Daniel Cojan – Negeri Sembilan FA – 2006–2007
- Lucas Ariel Cominelli – Pahang FA – 2005
- Gaston Marcel Conlon – Johor FC – 2005–2006
- Matías Conti – Pahang – 2013–2015
- Matias Cordoba – Penang − 2016
- Fernando Daniel – Penang NTFA FC – 2005–2006
- Emanuel De Porras – Negeri Sembilan – 2012–2013
- Norberto Dario Decoud – Kuala Lumpur FA – 1997
- Nicolás Delmonte – Johor Darul Takzim II − 2014–2015
- Jorge Pereyra Díaz – Johor Darul Takzim – 2014, 2015–2016, 2018
- Nicolas Dul – Kuala Lumpur FA – 2017, 2020, Melawati F.C. – 2019,
- Fernando Elizari – JDT – 2018
- Edurado Alberto Escobar – Melaka FA – 2006–2007
- Federico Falcone – Terengganu FA – 2016–2017
- Matías Favano – Felda United FC – 2011–2012
- Nico Fernández – JDT II – 2017–2021
- Brian Ferreira – JDT – 2017
- Luciano Figueroa – Johor Darul Takzim – 2013–2015, 2018
- Fabrizio Rene Franceschi – MPPJ FC – 2004–2006
- Brian Fuentes – Selangor FA – 2004–2006
- Gustavo Fuentes – Public Bank FC – 2004–2005, Malacca FA 2005–2006, Johor FC – 2007–2008
- Ezequiel Gallegos – Johor FA – 2013
- Gonzalo Garavano – Perlis – 2013
- Mario Gomez – Kelantan FA – 1997–1998
- Miguel Gonzalez – Selangor FA – 2004
- Pedro Gonzalez – Penang FA – 2007–2008
- Luciano Goux – Perak FA – 2003–2004
- **Luciano Guaycochea** – **Perak FC** – 2022–
- Gabriel Guerra – PKNS − 2015-2016, 2019, JDT – 2017, Sarawak United – 2020
- **Manuel Hidalgo** – **Sri Pahang FC** – 2021–2022, 2024– Kedah – 2023–
- **Nicolas Damian Insaurralde** – **Bunga Raya F.C.** – 2024–
- Victor Rafael Insaurralde – Johor FC – 2006
- Jose Luis Iriarte – Pahang FA – 1993, Negeri Sembilan FA – 1996–1997
- Cristiano Lopes – Pahang FA – 2008–2009
- Gustavo López – Terengganu – 2015–2016
- Adrian Maldonado – Malacca FA – 2005–2006
- Juan Martin Lucero – JDT – 2016
- Nicolas Marotta – Sarawak United – 2020
- Fernando Marquez – JDT – 2018
- Bruno Sebastian Martelotto – MPPJ FC – 2003–2005, Armed Forces – 2011–14, Negeri Sembilan Matrix – 2015
- Christian Medrano – Kelantan FA – 1997
- Sebastián Monesterolo – MPPJ FC – 2005
- Juan Jose Morales – Terengganu FA – 2016
- Aldo Andrés Mores – Selangor FA – 2004–2005
- José Nadalich – Telekom Melaka FC – 2005
- Alberto Naves – Pahang FA – 1996
- Leonel Nunez – Johor Darul Takzim – 2013
- Luciano Olier – Kelantan FA – 2006–2007
- Mauro Olivi – Selangor FA – 2016
- Lucas Ontivero – JDT II – 2018–2019
- Muriel Orlando – Johor FA – 2012–2013
- Luciano Osmar – Negeri Sembilan FA – 2003
- Germán Pacheco – Pahang − 2016
- Emerson Mariano Panigutti – Kuala Lumpur FA – 2003
- Luis Pablo Pozzuto – Kelantan FA – 1997–1998, Penang FA – 2001–2003
- Lucas Pugh – UiTM FC – 2018
- Carlos Augusto Quiñonez – Kuala Lumpur FA – 2005–2006, PDRM FA – 2007–2008
- Patito Rodriguez – JDT – 2015
- Leonardo Rolon – Kelantan FC – 2023
- Gustavo Romero – Penang FA – 2002–2003, Kelantan FA – 2006–2007
- Yamil Romero – Pahang FC – 2017
- **Ignacio Sequeira** – **Bunga Raya F.C.** – 2024–
- Ricardo Adrian Silva – Perak FA – 2004–2006
- Walter Ariel Silva – Perak FA – 2007–2008
- Gonzalo Soto – PKNS − 2016–2017, Sarawak United – 2022
- Fernando Horacio Spinelli – Pahang FA – 2005
- Gaston Felipe Stang – Kedah FA – 2004
- Adrian Trinidad – PLUS FC – 2007–2008
- Sergio Unrein – Pahang FC – 2018
- **Nicolas Vargas Valinotti** – **Bunga Raya F.C.** – 2024–
- Leandro Velázquez – JDT − 2015, 2019–2023
- Nicolas Velez – Negeri Sembilan FC – 2018, Felda United – 2019
- Leonardo Adrian Veron – Kedah FA – 2004
- Pablo Cesar Villa – Shahzan Muda FC – 2005–2006
- Pablo Vranjican – Pahang FC – 2016
- Jonathan Javier Zarini – Kelantan FA – 2006–2007

=== Bolivia ===
- David Ribera – Kelantan Darul Naim F.C. – 2024

=== Brazil ===
- **Adriano** – Melaka United – 2021–2022, **Penang** – 2023–
- Alex – Melaka United – 2021
- Alexandro – Selangor FA – 2007
- **Aylton Alemão** – **Kuching City** – 2021–
- Gilberto Alemao – Felda United – 2016
- Fabio Alexander – Felda United – 2008
- Almir – Negeri Sembilan FC – 2019–2020
- Matheus Alves – Pahang FA – 2017, Negeri Sembilan – 2022
- Renan Alves – Kedah – 2019–2021
- **Vinicius Amaral** – **Gombak F.C.** – 2024–
- Rodrigo Anderson – Sarawak FA – 2004
- Andrezinho – Johor FA – 2012–13, JDT – 2013, PDRM – 2016, 2019
- Andrezinho – Sabah – 2005–2006, 2014–2016
- Airton Andrioli – Negeri Sembilan FA – 1997
- Marcos Antonio – Johor Darul Takzim – 2014–2018
- Thiago Junior Aquino – Perak – 2015–2017, Felda United – 2018–2019
- Thiago Azulao – Johor FC – 2012
- Jonathan Balotelli – Kedah – 2023
- João Bandoch – Telekom Melaka FC – 2004–2005, Perlis FA – 2006–2007
- Fernando Barbosa – Negeri Sembilan FC – 2021
- Fabio Leandro Barbosa – Negeri Sembilan FA – 2013
- Jose Ramirez Barreto – Penang FA – 2004–2005
- Carlos Roberio Teixeira Barreto – Kedah FA – 1997–1998
- **Bergson** – **JDT** – 2021–
- Arthuro Henrique Bernhardt – Johor FC – 2012
- Bruno Bezerra – Perak FA II – 2020
- Rafael Bonfim – JDT II – 2016
- Diego Braga – Terengganu FA – 2007
- **Washington Brandão** – **PJ City** – 2019–2020, **Kelantan Darul Naim F.C.** – 2024–
- Brener – Shahzan Muda FC – 2008
- Herlison Caion – Selangor FC – 2022, KL City – 2023
- Maycon Calijuri – UiTM FC – 2019
- Diogo Campos – Negeri Sembilan FC – 2021
- Paulo Roberto da Silva Carazinho – Kedah FA – 2005–2006
- Careca – Perak FC – 2019–2021
- Igor Carioca – Negeri Sembilan FC – 2020
- Léo Carioca – KL City – 2016, Felcra FC – 2018–2019
- Ivan Carlos – Pahang FA – 2020
- Igor Carneiro – Negeri Sembilan FC – 2019
- Casagrande – KL City – 2016, Felcra F.C. – 2018, Melaka United – 2019, Penang – 2019–2022, Negeri Sembilan FC – 2023
- Cássio – Kelantan FC – 2018–2019
- Alessandro Celin – Kelantan FA – 2017
- Charles Souza Chad – PDRM FA – 2014, Perak FA – 2015, Perlis FA – 2016
- Chay – Kedah FA – 2013
- **Clayton** – **Perak FC** – 2024–
- **Cleylton** – **Kedah Darul Aman F.C.** – 2024–
- Ramon da Silva Costa – PKNP FC – 2019
- Cristiano – Kelantan FC – 2018
- Patrick Cruz – Pahang FA – 2018
- Arthur Cunha – Negeri Sembilan FC – 2021
- Marcelo Padilha da Rocha – Kuala Lumpur FA – 2004
- Jose Luis Camineiro da Silva
- Jose Carneiro da Silva – Kedah FA – 1991
- David da Silva – Terengganu FC – 2021
- Mario Da Silva – Penang FA – 2006–2009
- Murilo Damasceno – JDT II – 2018
- Darci – Sabah FA – 2004
- Gabriel Davis – Terengganu FA – 2017
- Murilo de Almeida – Kuantan FA – 2018
- Rafael Gomes de Oliveira – Negeri Sembilan FC – 2021
- Luis Cardozo de Souza – Perlis FA – 1998
- Demerson – Sarawak FA – 2017–2018, Sarawak United – 2020
- Devid – Kelantan United – 2023
- Hudson Dias – Sarawak FA – 2019, Kuching City – 2020–2021
- **Rodrigo Dias** – **Penang** – 2024–
- Diogo – JDT – 2019–2020, 2023
- Jurandir dos Santos – Terengganu FA – 2004–2005
- Leandro Dos Santos – T-Team – 2014, Selangor – 2015, Perak – 2017–2021
- Luiz Ricardo Lino Dos Santos – Penang – 2014
- Dudu – MISC-MIFA – 2017
- Bruno Dybal – Kuching City – 2023
- Fudje Elber – Perak UPB FC – 2005–2006
- Elias – Perak FA – 2016
- Eliel – Perak – 2014, UiTM – 2016
- Elizeu – PJ City – 2018–2020
- Evaldo – Selangor – 2014
- Everton – Langkawi Glory United F.C. – 2019
- Felipe – Melaka United – 2017
- Jose Ricardo Silveiro Felix – Perlis FA – 1991
- Fernando de Abreu Ferreira – Johor FC – 2012
- Fabio Flor – Terengganu FA – 2005–2008, T–Team 2013–2014
- Jose Luiz Feitoza – Sarawak FA – 2007
- Gleisson Freire – Terengganu FA – 2008
- Gilberto Fortunato – PKNP FC – 2017, Felda United – 2018
- Gabryel – Kuching City – 2022
- Flavio Rocha Galvao – Perak FA – 2003
- Giancarlo – PJ City – 2019, PKNP FC – 2019
- Gilmar – Kelantan FA – 2015, Sarawak FA – 2016, Perak – 2017–2019
- Luis Fernando Gomes – Terengganu FA
- Paulo Sergio Ferreira Gomes – PKNS FC – 2012
- Giovane Gomes – Melaka United – 2021, Penang – 2023
- Evaldo Goncalves – T-Team – 2013
- Mazinho – Sabah FA – 2004–2006
- Gustavo – UiTM FC – 2020, Negeri Sembilan FC – 2022
- Nixon Guylherme – Kelantan FC – 2022
- Heberty – JDT – 2023
- Henrique – Negeri Sembilan FA – 2016
- Pedro Henrique – PJ City – 2019
- Felipe Hereda – Kelantan FC – 2022
- Hyuri – Selangor FC – 2022
- Jackson – Sabah – 2022
- Jailton – Pahang FC – 2016
- Piousdinho Evierhome James – Sarawak FA – 2007–2008
- Carlos Alberto Jeronimo – Perak FA – 2003
- Jocian – Terengganu FA – 2007–2008
- Jocinei – Felda United – 2019
- Bryan Jones – Kuching City – 2021
- Jorge – JDT – 2018
- Junior – Sabah FA – 2007
- Flavio Beck Junior – Negeri Sembilan FA – 2018, Kelantan FC – 2019
- Luiz Junior – Sabah – 2019
- Valci Júnior – Perlis FA – 2019
- Kahê – Kedah FA – 2016
- Cristiano Selbach Kiko – Kedah FA – 2004
- Lazaro – Terengganu FA – 2017
- Vinicius Leonel – Negeri Sembilan FC – 2023
- Willian Lira – Kedah – 2023
- Reinaldo Lobo – Penang – 2015–2017
- Bruno Lopes – Kelantan FC – 2018
- Jonatan Lucca – Kelantan FA – 2016
- Andre Luis – Puchong Fuerza F.C. – 2019
- Vagner Luís – Shahzan Muda FC – 2008
- Igor Luiz – Negeri Sembilan FA – 2019–2020
- Wander Luiz – Kelantan FA – 2016, Perak – 2018–2020
- Ramon Machado – Sabah – 2023–2024
- Tércio Machado – KL PLUS FC – 2008
- Everson Maciel – Negeri Sembilan FA – 2003
- (Japan) Patrik Majeski – Gombak F.C. – 2024
- Marco Antonio Manso – Kedah FA – 2004
- Andre Correa Marcolina – Kedah FA –2004
- Alysson Marendaz Marins – Perak FA – 2005
- Rafael Marti – Tun Razak F.C. – 2019
- Bruno Matos – PKNS FC – 2018
- Maurício – JDT – 2019–2022
- Maycon – Pahang FA – 2012
- Juliano Mineiro – Selangor FC – 2017
- Sharlei Lins Miranda – Terengganu FA – 2005–2006
- Alex Moraes – Pahang FC – 2018, Negeri Sembilan FC – 2018
- Hilton Moreira – Penang – 2015–2016
- **Luiz Henrique Motta** – **Perak FC** – 2024–
- **Murilo** – **JDT FC** – 2024–
- **Emmanuel Corvelloni Nascimento** – **Gombak F.C.** – 2024–
- Andre Luis Almeida de Nascimento – Kedah FA – 1996–1998
- Daniel Soares Neves – Kedah FA – 2012
- Diogo Oliveira – Puchong Fuerza F.C. – 2019
- **Neto Oliveira** – **Penang** – 2024–
- Pedro Paulo Oliveira – Negeri Sembilan FA – 1998
- Rodrigo Amorim Oliveira – Sarawak FA – 2019
- Willian Pacheco – Selangor FC – 2018
- Emerson Mariano Panigutti – Kuala Lumpur FA – 2003
- Jailton Paraiba – Sabah – 2023
- Pedrao – Sarawak FA – 2019
- **João Pedro** – **Sabah** – 2024–
- Edvaldo Goncalves Pereira – UPB-MyTeam FC – 2008
- Junior Pereira – Felda United – 2013
- **Gabriel Peres** – **Sabah** – 2023–
- Neto Pessoa – Sabah – 2022
- Eduardo Pincelli – Sabah FA – 2005
- **Ricardo Pires** – **Negeri Sembilan FC** – 2024–
- Thiago Quirino – Felda United – 2019
- Rafael – Pahang FA – 2007
- Rafinha – Negeri Sembilan FC – 2021
- Rafael Ramazotti – PKNS FC – 2018
- **Ramon** – **Sabah** – 2023–
- Paulo Rangel – Perak – 2013, Selangor – 2014, Terengganu – 2015, Johor Darul Takzim II – 2016, Kedah – 2018
- **Felipe de Lima Ribeiro** – **Immigration F.C.** – 2024–
- Luiz Ricardo – Penang FA – 2014
- Gregory Rocha – Kelantan United – 2023
- Rafael Rodrigues – Kuala Lumpur FA – 2004
- Júlio Cesar Rodriguez – Sabah FA – 2005–2006, Perlis FA – 2008
- Ronaldo – Perak FC – 2019
- Adilson Roque – Kuala Lumpur FA – 1996–1998
- Sandro – Kedah – 2015–2018, Selangor FC – 2019–2020, Sarawak United – 2021
- Marcos Santana – Proton FC – 2008
- Douglas Santos – Johor FA – 2006–2007
- Celio Santos – Kuching City – 2023
- Marcio Santos – Ultimate F.C. – 2020
- Erison da Silva Santos – Terengganu FA – 2011–2012
- André Scotti – Sabah FA – 2008
- Serginho – PJ City – 2019
- Paulo Sérgio – PKNS FC – 2012
- Liberto Silas – Brunei – 2004
- Edson Silva – Terengganu FA – 2008
- Lucas Silva – Penang – 2022, Sri Pahang FC – 2023
- Rafael Silva – Sri Pahang FC – 2023
- Bruno Soares – JDT II – 2018–2019
- Helton Soares – Pahang FA – 2003, Terengganu FA – 2005–2007
- Marcos Soares – Terengganu FA – 2005–2006
- Cílio Souza – Terengganu FA – 2005
- Márcio Souza – Terengganu – 2013–2014
- Rafael Souza – Perak FA – 2013, PDRM FA – 2014
- Adalberto De Souza Sequiera- Perlis FA – 2001–2002, 2005
- Tadeu – Penang FA – 2016–2017
- Marcos Tavares – Kedah FA – 2004, 2005–2006
- Leandro Teofilo – Sime Darby FC – 2012
- Tiago – DPMM FC – 2006, 2008
- Rodrigo Tosi – DPMM FC – 2004–2005
- Marco Tulio – T-Team – 2012, Perak – 2014–2015, Sabah – 2016–2017
- Felipe Veras – Sabah FA – 2004–2005
- Pedro Victor – PKNP FC – 2019
- Yan Victor – Kelantan United – 2023
- Jose Luis Vieira – Sarawak FA – 2007–2008
- Luis Rodrigo Vieira – Kuala Lumpur FA – 2004–2005, 2005–2006
- Matheus Vila – Negeri Sembilan FC – 2019–2020
- Joel Vinicius – UiTM FC – 2021
- **Rafael Vitor** – **Penang** – 2020
- Danilo Vivaldo – Kedah FA – 2012
- **Nando Welter** – **Kuching City F.C.** – 2024–
- Ze Eduardo – Pahang FA – 2019

=== Chile ===
- Mauricio Arias – PKNS FC – 2017
- Iván Asenjo – Johor Pasir Gudang – 2007
- Carlos Barraza
- Mario Berríos – Perak FA – 2007–2008
- Carlos Cáceres – Perak FA – 2007–2008
- Cristian Carrasco – Kuala Muda NAZA FC – 2006–2007
- **Ronnie Fernández** – **Selangor** – 2024–
- Diego Inostroza – Kuala Lumpur FA – 2016
- Claudio Meneses – Pahang FC – 2016
- Danilo Miranda – Kelantan FA – 2006–2007
- Jorge Muñoz – Perak FA – 2007–2008
- Nelson San Martín – Kedah FA – 2006–08, 2013, T-Team – 2014
- Alejandro Tobar – DPMM FC – 2006–2007
- Antonio Vega – Kuala Muda NAZA FC – 2007–2008

=== Colombia ===
- Erwin Carrillo – Kelantan – 2015
- Ayron del Valle – Selangor FC – 2023
- Javier Estupinan – Terengganu FC – 2014
- **Jorge Obregón** – **Johor Darul Ta'zim FC** – 2024–
- Stiven Rodríguez – Sri Pahang FC – 2022

=== Paraguay ===
- Facundo Martin Arguello – Kuala Lumpur FA – 2005–2006
- Jorge Armando Rodriguez Arguello – Kuala Lumpur FA – 2006–2007
- Atilio Caceres – DPMM FC – 2006–2007
- Raul Norberto Caceres – Pahang FA – 2007
- Samuel Caceres –JDT II – 2017
- Victor Alejandro Gonzalez – Shahzan Muda FC – 2006–2008
- Hugo Daniel Lucena – Kuala Lumpur FA – 2006–2007
- Diego Mendieta – Johor FA – 2008
- Osvaldo Moreno – Johor FA – 2008
- Otelo Ocampos – Johor FA – 2007, 2008

=== Uruguay ===
- Luis Fernando Espindola – Public Bank – 2005, Malacca FA – 2006
- Raul Tarragona – Kelantan FC – 2019

=== Venezuela ===
- **Yohandry Orozco** – **Selangor FC** – 2023–

== Oceania – OFC ==
=== Fiji ===
- Esala Masi – Johor FC – 2005

=== New Zealand ===
- Chris Zoricich – Sabah – 1989
- Neil Jones – Kuala Lumpur FA – 2006
- Shane Smeltz – Kedah – 2016
- Kayne Vincent – Perlis – 2016
- Lawton Green – KL City – 2024–2025
- **Dane Ingham** – **Sabah** – 2025–

=== Papua New Guinea ===
- Nigel Dabinyaba – Penang – 2017

== Women's ==
=== Asia - AFC ===
==== Indonesia ====
- **Shalika Aurelia** – **Kelana United** –2025–
- **Viny Silfianus** – **Kelana United** –2025–

==== Japan ====
- Aoi Kizaki – Sabah – 2024
- Misaki Nakayama – Sabah – 2024
- Eri Narita – Sabah – 2024
- Saki Ueno – Sabah – 2024

==== Myanmar ====
- **Win Theingi Tun** – **Sabah** – 2024–

==== Singapore ====
- **Nur Izzati Rosni** – **Selangor** – 2025–
- **Ernie Sulastri** – **Selangor** – 2025–

==== South Korea ====
- **Sebin An** – **Sabah** – 2025–

=== Africa - CAF ===
==== Nigeria ====
- **Alli Barakat Bukola** – **Red Eagles** – 2025–
