= Mpondo (surname) =

Mpondo is a surname. Notable people with the surname include:

- Alain Njoh Njoh Mpondo, Cameroonian football defender
- Andries Mpondo (born 1963), South African football striker
- Hortavie Mpondo, Cameroonian actress and model
- Stéphane Kingué Mpondo (born 1985), Cameroonian football midfielder
