= Centro de Futebol Zico Sociedade Esportiva =

CFZ do Rio
- Full name: Centro de Futebol Zico Sociedade Esportiva
- Nicknames: CFZ; Time do Zico; Azulão
- Founded: 12 July 1996; 29 years ago
- Ground: Estádio Antunes, Rio de Janeiro, Brazil
- Capacity: 1,000
- Chairman: (Brazil) Bruno de Sá Coimbra
- Head coach: (Brazil) Marcelo Marelli
- League: Campeonato Carioca Segunda Divisão
- 2010: Campeonato Carioca Segunda Divisão, Group C, 9th
- Website: http://www.ziconarede.com.br/cfzdorio/
Home colours	Away colours

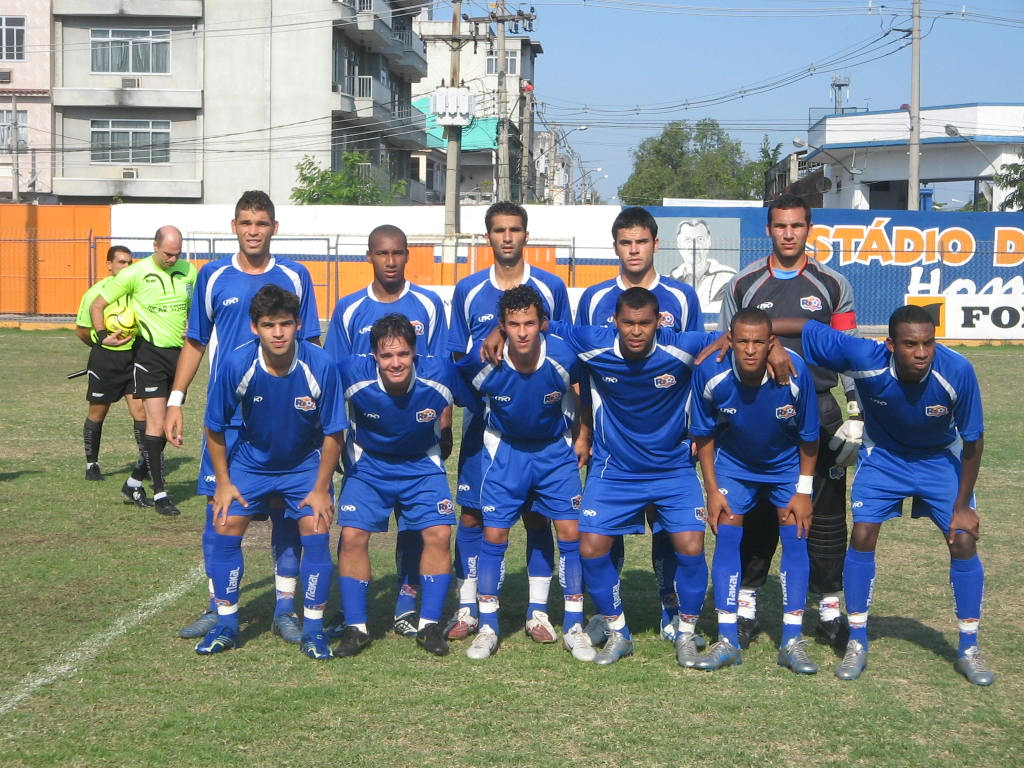
Team photo from the 2007 season

Centro de Futebol Zico Sociedade Esportiva, or simply CFZ do Rio is a Brazilian football team from Rio de Janeiro, founded by Zico on July 12, 1996.

Three years later, on August 1, 1999, CFZ do Rio founded a branch in Brasília (Distrito Federal), known as CFZ de Brasília.

== History ==
Unlike of that occurs with the associations sports traditional whose foundation is marked by signature of an ata, a club-company passes the exist in date in that is registered its contract social. The CFZ do Rio entered in activity this way, in molds of law that has the signature of Zico on July 12, 1996, six months after the first birthday of Centro de Futebol Zico, in Recreio dos Bandeirantes.

The great goal of Zico with the creation of a club was give continuity to work of academies of its Soccer Center, providing to young the possibility of compete. Teams were formed in five main categories: Mirim, Infantil, Juvenil, Juniores and professional. The first game was by category Juvenil against the São Cristóvão in Duque de Caxias, by Copa Rio.

First club-company registered in Brazil, initially if called Rio de Janeiro Sociedade Esportiva. The team still competed as Rio de Janeiro, but the name had of be abandoned because already had a record similar. On February 4, 1998, the CFZ name became official and the ‘do Rio’ is added to Facebook the essence of idea original.

So as its owner, the CFZ do Rio born fated the win. The team professional joined in Third Division of State Championship in 1997 and already premiered being champion. In final held on September 27, the team headed by Jaime de Almeida with Joubert Filho in fitness and Joubert in coordination and technical knowledge, defeated Duquecaxiense by 1–0, goal of Japanese Takayuki Suzuki. Suzuki defended later the selection of Japan and was headed by Zico between 2002 and 2006.

In other categories not was different. Since that the club entered in activity, Juniores e Juvenil obtained results expressive. Under the command of former players Adílio and Andrade, contemporary of Zico in midfield of Flamengo the CFZ won the tricampeonato of Second Division of Juniores (1999, 2000 and 2002). And still arrived to championship of Taça Otávio Pinto Guimarães, Competition that meets the main teams of State in same category. In 2000, the team Juvenil reached the Title state undefeated while the team Mirim raised the cup in year earlier. In this same years, Zico had the idea of lead the project to where there higher organization and structure in league regional. Was so that arose the CFZ de Brasília.

=== CFZ de Brasília ===
The CFZ do Rio gave origin the a branch based in city of Brasília (Distrito Federal): the homonym CFZ de Brasília. The club from Brasília was founded on August 1, 1999, in society with the company HPMA. The two clubs passed the use the same players and technical committee during some time.

=== CFZ Imbituba ===
In 2009, CFZ do Rio hit a partnership with the Imbituba Futebol Clube to constitute a club company in Imbituba (Santa Catarina), known as CFZ Imbituba. Having the mission of promote the sports as means of integration social and of achieve the excellence and the high income in more several championships played always with the goal of develop talents with responsibility.

=== Flamengo ===
In 2010, they joined a partnership with Flamengo. The club of Estádio da Gávea assign players not recovered of the youth team and professional to the team of Zico. Also is announced a lease of club to the group of investors MFD that will responsible by all the expenditure of club.

== Achievements ==
=== State ===
- Campeonato Carioca Série B1:
  - Winners (2): 1997, 2004

=== Other tournaments ===
- Copa Integração:
  - Winners (1): 2001

=== Youth team ===
- Campeonato Carioca Segunda Divisão de Juniores:
  - Winners (3): 1999, 2000, 2002
- Taça Octávio Pinto Guimarães:
  - Winners (2): 1999, 2000
- Campeonato Carioca de Mirins:
  - Winners (1): 1999
- Campeonato Carioca Segunda Divisão de Juvenis:
  - Winners (1): 2000
- Copa Integração de Infantis:
  - Winners (1): 2002
- Campeonato Carioca Segunda Divisão de Infatis:
  - Winners (1): 2003
- Copa da Amizade de Infatis:
  - Winners (1): 2003
- Copa Guilherme Embry de Infatis:
  - Winners (1): 2003
- Copa Roberto Dinamite de Pré-Mirins:
  - Winners (1): 2004
- Copa Integração de Juniores:
  - Winners (1): 2005
- Copa Sendas de Juniores:
  - Winners (1): 2005
- Copa Rio Orla de Pré-Mirins:
  - Winners (1): 2008
- Copa Danone de Mirins:
  - Winners (1): 2009
- Copa Danone de Mirins:
  - Winners (1): 2009

== Kit manufacturer ==
List of CFZ do Rio's sponsors and kit manufacturers.

Period	Kit Manufacturer
?	Nakal

== Current squad ==
As of December, 2010, according to combined sources on the official website.

Note: Flags indicate national team as defined under FIFA eligibility rules; some limited exceptions apply. Players may hold more than one non-FIFA nationality.

No.	Pos.	Nation	Player
—	GK	BRA	Fabrício
—	GK	BRA	Felipe Sobral
—	GK	BRA	Gustavo
—	DF	BRA	Britto
—	DF	BRA	Diego Morais
—	DF	BRA	Vladimir Tatuí
—	DF	BRA	Ricardo Rocha
—	DF	BRA	Maicon
—	DF	BRA	Diogo
—	DF	BRA	Fernando
—	DF	BRA	Rafael
—	DF	BRA	Paulo Vinicius
—	DF	BRA	Wallace (loan from Botafogo)
—	DF	BRA	Thiago Rocha
—	DF	BRA	Daniel
—	DF	BRA	Renan (loan from Botafogo)
—	MF	BRA	Abrantes

No.	Pos.	Nation	Player
—	MF	BRA	Da Silva
—	MF	BRA	Lucien (loan from Botafogo)
—	MF	BRA	Thiago
—	MF	BRA	Papel
—	MF	BRA	Jocian
—	MF	BRA	Lamartine
—	MF	BRA	Souza
—	MF	BRA	Jeferson
—	MF	BRA	Tic (captain)
—	MF	BRA	Rafael de Sá Rodrigues
—	MF	BRA	Dieguinho
—	MF	BRA	Tartari
—	MF	BRA	Igor Lucas
—	FW	BRA	André Norat
—	FW	BRA	André
—	FW	BRA	Edmilson

== Youth squad ==
=== Professional players able to play in the youth team ===
Note: Flags indicate national team as defined under FIFA eligibility rules; some limited exceptions apply. Players may hold more than one non-FIFA nationality.

No.	Pos.	Nation	Player
—	GK	BRA	Gustavo
—	DF	BRA	Fernando
—	MF	BRA	Papel
—	MF	BRA	Rafael de Sá Rodrigues
—	MF	BRA	Dieguinho

No.	Pos.	Nation	Player
—	MF	BRA	Tartari
—	MF	BRA	Igor Lucas
—	FW	BRA	André
—	FW	BRA	Edmilson

=== Youth players with first team experience ===
Note: Flags indicate national team as defined under FIFA eligibility rules; some limited exceptions apply. Players may hold more than one non-FIFA nationality.

No.	Pos.	Nation	Player

== Out on loan ==
Note: Flags indicate national team as defined under FIFA eligibility rules; some limited exceptions apply. Players may hold more than one non-FIFA nationality.

No. / Pos. / Nation / Player; — / DF / BRA / Felipe (loan to Flamengo)	No. / Pos. / Nation / Player; — / DF / BRA / Elvis Marley (loan to Flamengo)

== First-team staff ==
As of December 28, 2010

Position	Name	Nationality
Coach	Marcelo Marelli	Brazilian

== Noted players ==
This is a list of noted footballers who have played for CFZ do Rio whether or not they have a Wikipedia article. Players who have made significant/notable contribution to the club are included.

=== List of players ===
As of December 28, 2010.

Positions key
GK	Goalkeeper	CB	Centre back	FB	Full back
DM	Defensive midfielder	CM	Central midfielder	AM	Attacking midfielder
W	Winger	FW	Forward	ST	Striker

Statistics correct as of match played December 28, 2010

Player name	Position	CFZ do Rio career	Appearances	Goals	Birth date	Birth place	Nationality
Newton	ST	2004	?	?	July 24, 1976	Rio de Janeiro (Brazil)	Lebanon
Ronan	FB; CB	2008–2009	?	?	May 7, 1985	Magé (Brazil)	Equatorial Guinea
Takayuki Suzuki	FW; AM	1997; 1999	?	?	June 5, 1976	Hitachi	Japan
Tomoyuki Hirase	ST	1998	?	?	May 23, 1977	Kagoshima	Japan

== Noted coaches ==
The following is a list of Centro de Futebol Zico Sociedade Esportiva coaches.

Name	Nationality	Periods	Notes
Adílio	Brazil	?	
Andrade	Brazil	?	

== Stadium ==
=== Estádio Antunes ===
CFZ do Rio's home stadium is nominally the José Antunes Coimbra Filho (also known as Estádio Antunes), which was inaugurated on March 29, 1997, and has a capacity of 1,000 fans.

== Presidents ==
- Bruno de Sá Coimbra (?)

== See also ==
- Centro de Futebol Zico de Brasília Sociedade Esportiva
