= Andrew Clark (soccer) =

Australian soccer player (born 1974)

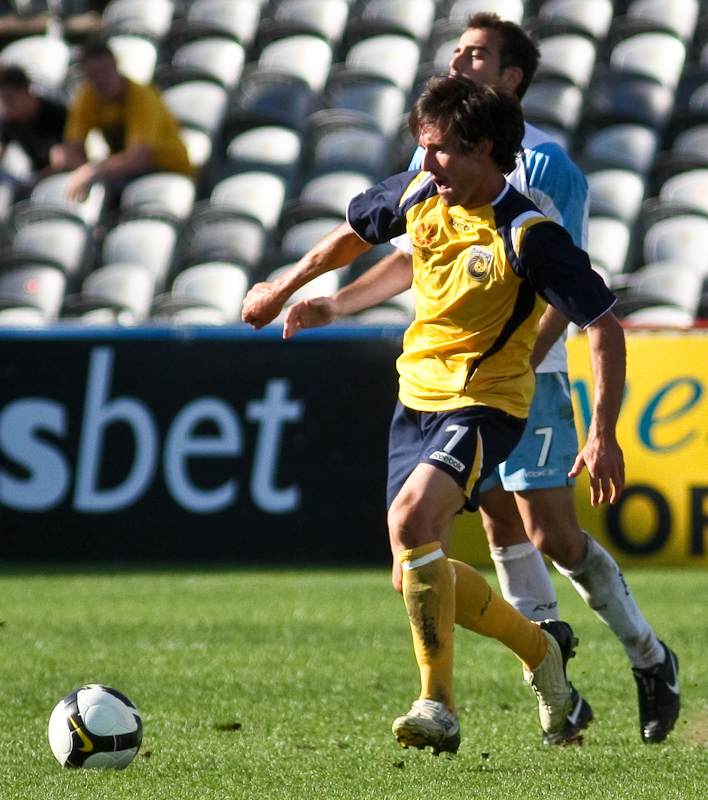
- Clark playing for Central Coast Mariners Youth in 2008

Personal information
- Full name: Andrew Charles Clark
- Date of birth: 24 August 1974 (age 52)
- Place of birth: Gosford, Australia
- Height: 1.81 m (5 ft 11 in)
- Position: Right-back

Youth career
- 1980–1982: Wyoming
- 1983–1985: PMK
- 1985–1991: Central Coast
- 1986: Umina
- 1992: Highfields Azzuri

Senior career*
Years	Team	Apps	(Gls)
1992–1997	Central Coast		
1997–1998	Five-One-Seven	26	(3)
1998–2000	Canberra Cosmos	21	(5)
2000–2001	Parramatta Power	17	(0)
2001–2002	Central Coast	21	(2)
2002	Manly-Warringah		
2002–2003	APIA Leichhardt	18	(1)
2003	Kedah FA	31	(1)
2003–2004	APIA Leichhardt	17	(1)
2004	Northern Tigers FC	9	(0)
2004–2005	APIA Leichhardt		
2005–2010	Central Coast Mariners	84	(0)
- * Club domestic league appearances and goals

Andrew Charles Clark (born 24 August 1974) is an Australian former soccer player who played as a defender. As a player, had stints in the Australian National Soccer League (NSL) and A-League, most notably for Canberra Cosmos, Parramatta Power and the Central Coast Mariners. Since the later part of his playing career, he has worked as a fitness coach, including stints with the Central Coast Mariners, Vegalta Sendai, Sydney FC and the Australia men's national soccer team.

== Early life ==
Clark was born in Gosford, on the Central Coast of New South Wales.

== Playing career ==
=== Early years ===
Clark played youth football for a number of clubs on the Central Coast, including Central Coast FC, where he played several seasons in the first team in the 1990s. In 1997, he was one of four Australians signed by Five-One-Seven to play in the Hong Kong First Division League in 1997–98. He spent the subsequent twelve years playing for a number of clubs in New South Wales, with the exception of a season in Malaysia with Kedah FA in the 2003 Liga Perdana 1.

Clark announced that he would be retiring as a player in February 2010, at the end of the 2009–10 Central Coast Mariners season.

== Coaching career ==
Clark took up a position as the strength and conditioning coach at Central Coast Mariners while still a player for the club.

In late 2013, it was announced that Clark would be leaving the Mariners, following former Central Coast head coach Graham Arnold for a position with Vegalta Sendai in the J.League. He left Vegalta shortly after Arnold was sacked by the club in April 2014.

Clark signed on to be Sydney FC's head of strength and conditioning in May 2014, again linking up with Arnold. He then moved to the Socceroos to become the head of high performance, once again following Gram Arnold. Andrew has been with the Socceroos for four years.

== Honours ==
=== Club ===
Central Coast Mariners:

- A-League Premiership: 2007–08
- A-League Pre-Season Challenge Cup: 2005

== See also ==
- List of Central Coast Mariners FC players
- List of foreign Malaysian League players
