= Matías Favano =

Argentine footballer

Personal information
- Full name: Matías Ezequiel Favano Otermín
- Date of birth: 4 July 1980 (age 46)
- Place of birth: Morón, Argentina
- Height: 1.87 m (6 ft 2 in)
- Position: Midfielder

Senior career*
Years	Team	Apps	(Gls)
2001–2002	Platense	3	(0)
2002	Racing Club de Montevideo	14	(1)
2003–2004	Universidad de Concepción	6	(0)
2004	Deportivo Español	10	(0)
2005	Lech Poznań	3	(0)
2005	Lech Poznań II	9	(0)
2005	Polonia Warsaw	1	(0)
2006	Campobasso Calcio	7	(0)
2007–2008	Pomezia Calcio	37	(2)
2009	ASD Albalonga	12	(0)
2009	Pro Cisterna	11	(1)
2009	→ SS Monturanese Calcio (loan)	14	(1)
2010	Universitario de Sucre	13	(0)
2012	C.A.I.	9	(0)
- * Club domestic league appearances and goals

Matías Ezequiel Favano Otermín (born 4 July 1980) is an Argentine former professional footballer who played as a midfielder.
