= Hortavie Mpondo =

Cameroonian actress, model, and comedian (born 1992)

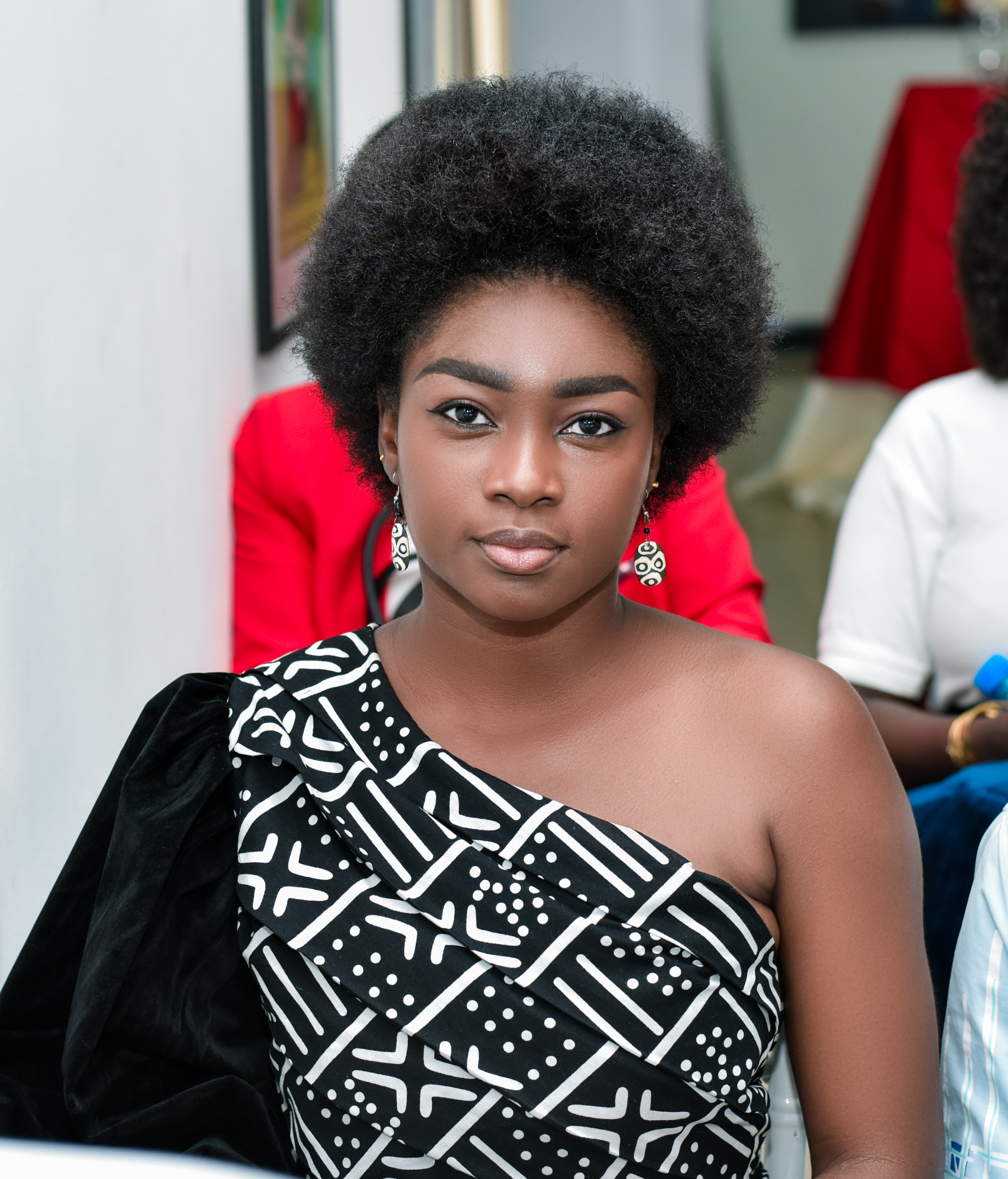
- Mpondo in March 2022
- Born: Hortavie Lydie Sengue Mpondo; June 27, 1992 (age 34); Limbe, Cameroon
- Education: University of Douala
- Occupations: Actress, model
- Years active: 2017-present

Hortavie Mpondo (born 27 June 1992) is a Cameroonian actress, model, and comedian.

== Biography ==
Mpondo was born in Limbe, Cameroon in 1992. She obtained her baccalaureate at the College Sonara. In 2010, Mpondo moved to Douala to study biochemistry at the University of Douala. Her parents were not supportive of her career choice in acting, believing artists to be illiterates.

Mpondo began her career as a model, and was the face for the BoldMakeUp brand. She also posed for BGFIBank Group in Cameroon. For a period, she was represented by the agency Niki Heat Model Management. In 2017, she represented the Deidoboy streetwear brand during the Deidoboy Fashion Day at Alfred Saker College in the Deïdo district in Douala alongside other personalities such as Cameroonian television presenter President Tchop Tchop.

In 2017, she turned her attention to film acting. That year, Mpongo starred as Amanda, the sister of Cynthia Elizabeth in Le Coeur d’Adzaï, co-directed by Stéphane Jung and Sergio Marcello. She portrayed Samira, the elder daughter of an abusive chief, in Therry Kamdem's short film Elles in 2018. In 2019, she played Morelia in Dante Fox's short film The Solo Girl. She said this was the most difficult role of her career, and she began shoking for it. Mpondo played the lead in the romantic comedy Coup de foudre à Yaoundé, directed by the blind filmmaker Mason Ewing.

In addition to acting and modeling, Mpondo works as a graphic designer. She supports the Me Too movement.

== Filmography ==
- 2017 : Le Coeur d’Adzaï as Amanda
- 2018 : Elles as Samira (short film)
- 2018 : Le Prince de Genève as Raïssa (short film)
- 2018 : Otage d’amour as Sylvie (TV series)
- 2019 : The Solo Girl as Morelia (short film)
- 2019 : La Parodie du Bonheur as Maelle (short film)
- 2019 : Coup de foudre à Yaoundé as Rose Young
- 2020 : Madame...Monsieur saison 1 (TV series) as Alice Mbarga
- 2021 : La nouvelle épouse (TV series) as Mouana
- 2021 : Madame...Monsieur saison 2 (TV series) as Alice Mbarga
- 2022 : Madame...Monsieur saison 3 (TV series) as Alice Mbarga
- 2023 : La bataille des chéries (TV series) as Biseck
- 2025 : Révélations Scandaleuses (Tv Series) as Myriam Ayala
- 2026 : Père Non Déterminé (Short film) as Elvira
