= Francois Mpessa =

Cameroonian footballer

Personal information
- Full name: François Ndongo Mpessa
- Date of birth: 3 December 1978 (age 47)
- Place of birth: Douala, Cameroon
- Height: 1.85 m (6 ft 1 in)
- Position: Defender

Senior career*
Years	Team	Apps	(Gls)
1996–2004	Canon Yaoundé		
2004–2005	Manning Rangers	27	(2)
2006–2007	Melaka TMFC		
2007	PSMS Medan	16	(1)
2008	DPMM		(1)
2009	Aigle Royal Menoua		

International career
1997	Cameroon	1	(0)
- * Club domestic league appearances and goals

François Ndongo Mpessa (born 3 December 1978 in Douala) is a Cameroonian former footballer who played as a defender.

== Club career ==
Among the clubs Mpessa played for are South African side Manning Rangers, Melaka TMFC of Malaysia, PSMS Medan of Indonesia and Brunei DPMM FC that played in the Malaysia Super League.

== International career ==
Mpessa earned his first and only cap in a friendly game in the year 1997.

== Honours ==
Canon Yaoundé

- Cameroonian Premier League: 2002
