= Ajah Ogechukwu =

Nigerian footballer

Personal information
- Full name: Wilson Ajah Ogechukwu
- Date of birth: 20 March 1972 (age 54)
- Place of birth: Lagos, Nigeria
- Position: Striker

Senior career*
Years	Team	Apps	(Gls)
–1990	Enyimba		
1991–1993	Roda JC	37	(8)
1993	VVV	11	(1)
1993	Roda JC	2	(0)
1994	Haarlem	2	(0)
1994–1995	Roda JC	0	(0)
1996	Perak		
1997	Gela	4	(0)

International career
1990	Nigeria	2	(0)
- * Club domestic league appearances and goals

Wilson Ajah Ogechukwu (born 20 March 1972) is a Nigerian retired footballer who is last known to have played as a striker for Gela.

== Career ==
In 1991, Ogechukwu signed for Dutch top flight side Roda JC, where he made 37 league appearances and scored 8 goals and said, "The coach doesn't say that much. It's always the players who are talking". On 8 May 1991, he debuted for Roda JC during a 0–2 loss to Fortuna Sittard. On 16 August 1991, Ogechukwu scored his first 2 goals for Roda JC during a 3–1 win over VVV. In 1993, he signed for VVV in the Dutch second tier. After that, Ogechukwu returned to Dutch top flight club Roda JC. Before the second half of 1996–97, he signed for Gela in the Italian third tier.
