= Santiago Bianchi =

Argentine footballer

Personal information
- Full name: Santiago Agustín Bianchi Paredes
- Date of birth: 29 September 1983 (age 43)
- Place of birth: Buenos Aires, Argentina
- Height: 1.76 m (5 ft 9 in)
- Position: Striker

Team information
- Current team: CA Fénix

Youth career
- 1995–2002: Platense

Senior career*
Years	Team	Apps	(Gls)
2003–2005	Vélez Sársfield	28	(5)
2005	→ Quilmes(loan)	4	(0)
2006	→ Oriente Petrolero (loan)	12	(3)
2006	→ Tiro Federal (loan)	13	(2)
2007	→ Platense (loan)	14	(6)
2007–2008	Pontevedra CF	0	(0)
2008–2009	Atlanta	34	(5)
2009–2010	Olmedo	8	(0)
2010	Aias Salamina		
2010–2011	Sambenedettese		
2011–2012	Mixto		
2012	CD Everton	7	(0)
2012–2013	Petrolero	3	(0)
2013	Tristán Suárez	15	(0)
2013–	CA Fénix	34	(7)
- * Club domestic league appearances and goals as of 23 March 2015

Santiago Agustín Bianchi Paredes (born 29 September 1983) is an Argentine football striker who plays for CA Fénix.

== Club career ==
Bianchi started his football career at the youth divisions of Club Atlético Platense. In 2003, he made his official debut in the Argentine Primera with Vélez Sársfield against Estudiantes de La Plata on 29 June. At Vélez he struggled to gain a consistent first-team place, and after two years with the club he was loaned to Quilmes, where his frustrations continued making only 4 league appearances for the cerveceros. During 2006 Bianchi had his first international experience with Bolivian club Oriente Petrolero, before returning to Argentina to play on loan for Tiro Federal in the second semester of that year, and later for his developmental team Platense, which he confessed being a loyal fan of. Since his contract with Vélez ended in 2007, he chose to play for Spanish side Pontevedra CF, where he remained for a year. In 2008, he was repatriated to Argentina by Club Atlético Atlanta of the Primera B Metropolitana. In July 2009, Bianchi signed for Ecuatorian team Deportivo Olmedo, thus making his third excursion abroad. In January 2010, Bianchi signed for Aias Salamina F.C.

== Club titles ==
Season	Club	Title
Clausura 2005	Vélez Sársfield	Primera División Argentina
