= Petar Bazić =

Serbian footballer and FIFA agent

Petar Bazic
Personal information
- Place of birth: Mladenovac, SFR Yugoslavia
- Position: Forward

Youth career
- Red Star Belgrade

Senior career*
Years	Team	Apps	(Gls)
- Rad
- Homenetmen
2005	Unirea Alba Iulia		
2006	Penang		
- * Club domestic league appearances and goals

Petar Bazić (Serbian Cyrillic: Петар Базић) is a licensed FIFA agent and former Serbian footballer.

== Playing career ==
Born in Mladenovac, SR Serbia, which was then part of Yugoslavia, Bazic tried out for Penang FA in late 2005 on the advice of fellow Serbian striker Saša Branežac and was registered on the last day of the transfer window. A muscle injury constraint preventing him from making his debut against Malacca Telekom, the Serbian scored off a corner during his real debut versus Negeri Sembilan FA in the 30th minute, ending the game 1–0.

Finishing his playing career in Malaysia, Bazic received his FIFA mediator license and became an official FIFA agent.
