= Jocian =

Brazilian footballer

Personal information
- Full name: Jocian Bento dos Anjos
- Date of birth: 27 August 1979 (age 47)
- Place of birth: Brazil
- Height: 1.73 m (5 ft 8 in)
- Position: Centre-back

Youth career
- –1999: Fluminense

Senior career*
Years	Team	Apps	(Gls)
1998–2003	Fluminense	8	(0)
2004	Ceará	12	(1)
2005	Tigres do Brasil	14	(2)
2006	Olaria	9	(0)
2007–2008	Terengganu FA	22	(4)
2011	CFZ-RJ	6	(0)
2011	Goytacaz	4	(0)
2011	Operário	10	(0)
2011–2013	Barra da Tijuca	18	(2)
2015	Mangaratibense	5	(0)
2015	Audax-RJ	4	(0)
Total		121	(9)
- * Club domestic league appearances and goals

Jocian Bento dos Anjos, commonly known as Jocian, (born 27 August 1979) is a Brazilian football manager and former player who played as a centre-back. He is the manager of the youth team at Fábrica de Craques.

== Career ==
Jocian began his professional career with Fluminense Football Club, and later moved abroad to play for Terengganu FA in the 2007–08 Malaysian Super League season.

Jocian signed with Operário for the 2011 Campeonato Mato-Grossense second division season.
