= Edmond Kingston =

Liberian former footballer

Eddie Kingston
Personal information
- Full name: Edmund Kingston
- Date of birth: 9 September 1981 (age 45)
- Place of birth: Liberia
- Height: 1.77 m (5 ft 9 1/2 in)
- Position: Midfielder

Youth career
- 1998–2000: St. John's Red Storm

Senior career*
Years	Team	Apps	(Gls)
2001	Brooklyn Knights		
2002–2003	NK Zagreb	0	(0)
2004	Selangor FA		
2004	ATM FA		
2006–2009	Village United		

International career
2001	Liberia	2	(0)
- * Club domestic league appearances and goals

Edmund Kingston (born 9 September 1981) is a Liberian former footballer who played as a midfielder.

He played with St. John's Red Storm and Brooklyn Knights in the United States, NK Zagreb in Croatia, Selangor FA and ATM FA in Malaysia, and Village United F.C. in Jamaica. He now helps with the development of young players

He made 2 appearances for the Liberian national team in 2001.
