= Boris Ovcin =

Croatian-born Australian soccer player

Personal information
- Date of birth: 23 May 1982 (age 44)
- Place of birth: Yugoslavia
- Position: Midfielder

Team information
- Current team: Langwarrin SC
- Number: 13

Youth career
- Clayton Inter
- Chelsea Hajduk
- Springvale White Eagles FC
- Gippsland Falcons SC
- –2000: South Melbourne FC

Senior career*
Years	Team	Apps	(Gls)
1990s	Springvale White Eagles FC		
2001	Dandenong Thunder SC		
2001–2002	Melbourne Knights FC	11	(0)
	Port Melbourne SC	10	
20??–2003	Frankston Pines FC		
2003–2004	Penang FA		
20??–2008	Frankston Pines FC		
2008–	Langwarrin SC		
- * Club domestic league appearances and goals

Boris Ocvin (born 23 May 1982 in Yugoslavia) is a Croatian-born Australian footballer who operates as midfielder for Langwarrin SC, of which he is the captain.

== Early life ==
Born in Yugoslavia, Ovcin was raised there until age 8 when his family relocated to Melbourne, Australia.

== Career ==
=== Youth ===
Upon his arrival in Melbourne, Ovcin had stints with the youth teams of Clayton Inter and Chelsea Hajduk, switching to Springvale where he made his senior debut at the age of 16. Under Billy Rae, he had a schedule that would require great exertion as it usually meant playing a reserve game then a senior game shortly after. Representing the state of Victoria form under-13 through under-15 level, the Australian scored the winning goal in the 1997 Youth State Championship semi-final, only to be knocked out by the Australian Capital Territory team in the final. Soon, he was noticed by the Victorian Institute of Sport who gave him a scholarship to their soccer program headed by Ernie Merrick. Throughout his time at the Institute, Ovcin was selected for three training camps for the Australia U17s but never made the final roster; despite this, it allowed him to compete in the National Youth League, the premier division for youth players, with Gippsland Falcons SC and South Melbourne FC.

=== Australia ===
Awarded with the Southern Division’s Player of the Year in 2000 at South Melbourne, the midfielder switched to Dandenong Thunder SC in 2001 and spent a great season there. Gaining the attention of agent Craig Nettelbeck, he penned a two-year contract with Melbourne Knights, a club that was part of the National Soccer League, the progenitor of the modern A-League. Deployed as a left wingback for the Knights, Ovcin lined up alongside Rodrigo Vargas, Saša Ognenovski, and Joel Porter but was rarely used seeing that Porter occupied his position and had good form. Unsatisfied with game time, he left to local outfit Port Melbourne SC where he made 10 appearances, resorting to Frankston Pines shortly after.

Returning from Malaysia, the former Melbourne Knights player got a non-football related job, becoming somewhat sleepy and unable to sprint as well. Despite this, he still was involved in soccer, moving from Frankston Pines to Langwarrin SC in 2008.

=== Penang ===
Interested in plying his trade overseas, the then 21-year old sent a video highlights package to various Southeast Asian teams with Penang of the Malaysia Super League the first to offer a deal. Following two days into the trial, he was officially bought by the club near the end of 2003, delivering two goals and two assists in his first two games, the second goal in a 3-2 triumph over Kedah. However, the Ramadan celebrations stultified Ovcin as there were no games held during the period coupled with homesickness. Because of this, his situation at Penang became more volatile and his form decreased, resulting in his eventual sacking by the club in June 2004.
