= Yun Woon-chul =

South Korean footballer

Personal information
- Date of birth: 1979 (age 46–47)
- Place of birth: South Korea
- Position: Striker

Senior career*
Years	Team	Apps	(Gls)
–2006	Daejeon HNP		
2006–2007	Telekom Malacca		(1)

International career
- South Korea U23
- * Club domestic league appearances and goals

- Yun Woon-chul
- Hangul: 윤원철
- RR: Yun Woncheol
- MR: Yun Wŏnch'ŏl

Yun Woon-chul (born 1979) is a South Korean former footballer.

== Telekom Malacca ==
Roped in by Malaysian team Telekom Malacca in December 2006 after registering 13 goals in 19 outings for Daejeon HSW, Woon-chul's main target was to help the club to the M-League title that season. However, the Korean striker ultimately failed, scoring his only goal in a 2-1 loss to Pahang i the 32nd minute. Eventually, in April 2007, Telekom Malacca cancelled his contract, saying that they wanted a more perspicacious player.
