= Geoff Dwyer =

Australian soccer player

Personal information
- Place of birth: Sydney, Australia
- Position(s): Defender

Senior career*
| Years | Team | Apps | (Gls) |
- Parramatta FC
| 2003 | Penang FA | | |
- *Club domestic league appearances and goals

Geoff Dwyer is a former professional footballer who last played for Penang FA of the Malaysia Super League.

== Early life ==
As a child, he dreamed of becoming a professional footballer.

== Penang ==
Designing for a living in Australia, Dwyer lined up for Parramatta FC of the National Premier Leagues NSW until Malaysian club Penang offered him a contract. On the recommendations of Guinean Balla Conde, Dwyer flew to Penang, forming a partnership with captain Chee Wan Hoe on trial there. Finally, in mid January 2003, the defender officially became the property of Penang, missing the preseason quadrangular tournament in Singapore but available for the Charity Shield. Within the space of five days, Penang had three friendlies, with Dwyer scoring in a 1–1 tie with second-tier side Kelantan SKMK. In the 2003 Charity Shield, he played his first competitive match for the club versus Selangor, scoring the game's only goal. Failure to advance in the 2003 Malaysia Cup catalyzed Penang to not extend the Australian's contract in September.
