= Bandoch =

Brazilian footballer

Personal information
- Full name: João Bandoch
- Date of birth: 31 May 1975 (age 51)
- Place of birth: Joinville, Brazil
- Position: Centre-back

Youth career
- 1985–1994: Joinville

Senior career*
Years	Team	Apps	(Gls)
1994–1998	Joinville		
1998	Alania Vladikavkaz		
1999	Botafogo	29	(1)
2000	Joinville		
2000	Fluminense	5	(0)
2001	Joinville		
2002	Remo		
2003	Ituano		
2004–2005	Perlis		
2006–2007	Telekom Malaysia		
- * Club domestic league appearances and goals

João Bandoch (born 31 May 1975), simply known as Bandoch, is a Brazilian former professional footballer who played as a centre-back.

== Career ==
Revealed by Joinville, he played for the club for most of his career, but was highlighted in 1999 by Botafogo, being a starter in the Copa do Brasil runner-up campaign in 1999. He also played for Alania Vladikavkaz for six months in 1998, in addition to Fluminense and football in Malaysia, where he ended his career.

Bandoch was elected in the ideal XI of the first 35 years of Joinville EC's history.

== Honours ==
Joinville

- Campeonato Catarinense: 2000

Perlis

- Malaysia Super League: 2005
- Malaysia Cup: 2004
