= Luis Pablo Pozzuto =

Argentine footballer

Personal information
- Full name: Luis Pablo Pozzuto
- Date of birth: 28 November 1968 (age 57)
- Place of birth: Argentina
- Positions: Midfielder; striker

Managerial career
- Years: Team
- Kuala Lumpur Youth Soccer
- 2024–2025: Bunga Raya Damansara F.C. (technical director)

Luis Pablo Pozzuto is an Argentine retired footballer and later head coach.

== Career ==
Pozzuto started his senior career with Club Social y Deportivo Yupanqui. He later played for Club Atletico San Lorenzo (youth), Deportivo Laferrere, Deportivo Morón, Club Almirante Brown, and Club Atlético Nueva Chicago. In 1994, he signed for Deportivo Mandiyú in the Argentine Primera División, where he made 24 appearances and scored 6 goals. He also played in Estudiantes de Mérida F.C., Dundee United, Kelantan FC, and Penang FC.
