= Fidadi Mohamed =

Moroccan footballer

Mohamed Fidadi
Personal information
- Full name: Mohamed Fidadi
- Date of birth: 2 March 1968 (age 58)
- Place of birth: Morocco
- Height: 1.80 m (5 ft 11 in)
- Position: Forward

Senior career*
Years	Team	Apps	(Gls)
1992–1996	OC Khouribga		
1996–1998	Ettifaq FC		
1998–2001	Selangor FA		
2001–2002	Victory		

International career
1992–1994	Morocco	6	(0)
- * Club domestic league appearances and goals

Mohamed Fidadi (born 2 March 1968) is a retired Moroccan footballer. As of 2014, he coaches the under-12 team of Al Shamal in Qatar.

== International career ==
Fidadi made his international debut on January 17, 1993 against the 0–1 away win over Ethiopia in the 1994 FIFA World Cup qualification (CAF – first round).
