= Luís Rodrigo Vieira =

Brazilian footballer

Luis Rodrigo Vieira
Senior career*
Years	Team	Apps	(Gls)
1993–2000	Grêmio FBPA		
2000–2004	S.C. Ulbra		
2004–2005	Kuala Lumpur FA		
2005	Ass. Sapiranga		
2005–2006	Kuala Lumpur FA		
2007	Ypiranga Erechim RS		
- * Club domestic league appearances and goals

Luis Rodrigo Vieira is a Brazilian football player.
