= Alain Njoh Njoh Mpondo =

Cameroonian footballer

Personal information
- Place of birth: Cameroon
- Position(s): Defender

Senior career*
Years	Team	Apps	(Gls)
- Lobi Stars F.C.
2004–2005	Telekom Malacca		
2008	CLB Huda Huế		
2012	Grants Braes AFC		
- *Club domestic league appearances and goals

Alain Njoh Njoh Mpondo is a Cameroonian retired footballer who last played for Grants Braes in New Zealand in 2012.

== Career ==
=== Malaysia ===
Despite being sent off twice in three games for Telekom Malacca of the Malaysia Super League in 2005, Mpondo was praised by coach Irfan, but was dropped by December that year after the Malaysia Cup, leaving him stranded in Malaysia with only a used return-ticket to the Netherlands.

=== Vietnam ===
Suspended for four matches and fined in early 2008 while with CLB Huda Huế, the Cameroonian's penalties were nullified by the Vietnam Football Federation one day later, with Bùi Văn Lâm punished instead. Again, in November, the defender was banned again for four rounds.

=== New Zealand ===
A defender for Grants Braes in 2012, Mpondo works for Southern Clams Limited, a fishery based in Dunedin.
