= 2019 PKNP FC season =

PKNP FC
2019 season
- President: Zainol Fadzi Paharuddin
- Head coach: Abu Bakar Fadzim
- Stadium: Manjung Municipal Council Stadium
- Malaysia Super League: 11th
- Malaysia FA Cup: Quarter-finals
- Malaysia Cup: To be determined
- Top goalscorer: League: Giancarlo (8); All: Giancarlo (11)

The 2019 season is PKNP FC's 4th competitive and 2nd consecutive season in the Malaysia Super League since being promoted from the Malaysia Premier League.

== Players ==
Note: Flags indicate national team as defined under FIFA eligibility rules; some limited exceptions apply. Players may hold more than one non-FIFA nationality.

| No. | Pos. | Nation | Player |
|---|---|---|---|
| 1 | GK | (Malaysia) MAS | Khairul Thaqif |
| 2 | MF | (Malaysia) MAS | Sukri Hamid |
| 3 | DF | (Philippines) PHI | Amani Aguinaldo (on loan from Ceres–Negros) |
| 4 | MF | (Malaysia) MAS | Fadhil Idris |
| 6 | MF | (Malaysia) MAS | Aizzat Maidin Koty |
| 7 | FW | (Malaysia) MAS | Hasnan Mat Isa |
| 8 | DF | (Brazil) BRA | Pedro Victor |
| 9 | FW | (Malaysia) MAS | Mugenthirran Ganesan |
| 10 | FW | (Palestine) PLE | Yashir Pinto |
| 11 | DF | (Malaysia) MAS | Nazirul Afif (on loan from Perak) |
| 12 | FW | (Malaysia) MAS | Azhar Arbi Radzuan |
| 13 | MF | (Malaysia) MAS | Al-Fateh Afandi |
| 14 | DF | (Malaysia) MAS | Faizzwan Dorahim |
| 15 | DF | (Malaysia) MAS | Syazwan Zaipol (on loan from Perak) |
| 16 | DF | (Malaysia) MAS | Naqiuddin Kamal |
| 17 | DF | (Malaysia) MAS | Ezanie Mat Salleh |

| No. | Pos. | Nation | Player |
|---|---|---|---|
| 19 | FW | (Malaysia) MAS | Fazrul Hazli |
| 20 | FW | (Malaysia) MAS | Khairul Asyraf |
| 21 | MF | (Malaysia) MAS | Hafiz Kamal |
| 22 | GK | (Malaysia) MAS | Asyraaf Omar |
| 25 | FW | (Malaysia) MAS | Hafiz Ramdan (captain) |
| 26 | DF | (Malaysia) MAS | Rafiq Faeez |
| 27 | DF | (Malaysia) MAS | Filemon Anyie |
| 28 | MF | (Malaysia) MAS | Ibni Khozaimi |
| 29 | FW | (Brazil) BRA | Ramón |
| 30 | FW | (Brazil) BRA | Giancarlo (on loan from Petaling Jaya City) |
| 31 | MF | (Malaysia) MAS | Mukhairi Ajmal |
| 33 | GK | (Malaysia) MAS | Shafiq Afifi |
| 34 | DF | (Malaysia) MAS | Farid Nezal |
| 44 | FW | (Malaysia) MAS | Alif Safwan |

== Transfers ==
=== 1st leg ===
==== In ====
Note: Flags indicate national team as defined under FIFA eligibility rules; some limited exceptions apply. Players may hold more than one non-FIFA nationality.

| No. | Pos. | Nation | Player |
|---|---|---|---|
| 1 | GK | (Malaysia) MAS | Khairul Thaqif (from Shah Alam Antlers) |
| 3 | DF | (Philippines) PHI | Amani Aguinaldo (loan from (Philippines) Ceres–Negros) |
| 5 | DF | (Tajikistan) TJK | Siyovush Asrorov (from (Tajikistan) Istiklol) |
| 7 | FW | (Malaysia) MAS | Hasnan Mat Isa (from Petaling Jaya Rangers) |
| 9 | FW | (Malaysia) MAS | Mugenthirran Ganesan (from MIFA) |
| 10 | MF | (Palestine) PLE | Yashir Pinto (from (Chile) Coquimbo Unido) |
| 12 | MF | (Ghana) GHA | Thomas Abbey (from (Egypt) Ismaily) |
| 18 | FW | (Senegal) SEN | Kalidou Yero (from (Portugal) Cova da Piedade) |
| 19 | MF | (Malaysia) MAS | Fazrul Hazli (from Felda United) |
| 20 | FW | (Malaysia) MAS | Khairul Asyraf (from Perak) |
| 21 | MF | (Malaysia) MAS | Hafiz Kamal (from Perak) |
| 26 | DF | (Malaysia) MAS | Rafiq Faeez (from Perak) |
| 30 | FW | (Brazil) BRA | Giancarlo (loan from Petaling Jaya City) |

==== Out ====
Note: Flags indicate national team as defined under FIFA eligibility rules; some limited exceptions apply. Players may hold more than one non-FIFA nationality.

| No. | Pos. | Nation | Player |
|---|---|---|---|
| 1 | GK | (Malaysia) MAS | Bryan See (to (Thailand) Bangkok) |
| 4 | DF | (Latvia) LVA | Ritus Krjauklis |
| — | DF | (South Korea) KOR | Kim Sang-woo |
| 6 | DF | (Central African Republic) CTA | Franklin Anzité (to Selangor United) |
| 11 | MF | (Malaysia) MAS | Irwan Syazmin (to UKM) |
| 13 | MF | (Malaysia) MAS | Deevan Raj (to Melaka United) |
| 16 | DF | (Malaysia) MAS | Raffi Nagoorgani (to Felda United) |
| 18 | DF | (Malaysia) MAS | Ganiesh Gunasegaran (to Petaling Jaya City) |
| 19 | FW | (Malaysia) MAS | Shahrel Fikri (loan to Perak) |
| 21 | MF | (Malaysia) MAS | Norhakim Isa (to Selangor) |
| 23 | GK | (Malaysia) MAS | Syazani Puat (to Perlis) |
| 27 | DF | (Malaysia) MAS | Khuzaimi Piee (to Melaka United) |

=== 2nd leg ===
==== In ====
Note: Flags indicate national team as defined under FIFA eligibility rules; some limited exceptions apply. Players may hold more than one non-FIFA nationality.

| No. | Pos. | Nation | Player |
|---|---|---|---|
| 8 | DF | (Brazil) BRA | Pedro Victor (from (Brazil) Noroeste) |
| 12 | DF | (Malaysia) MAS | Nazirul Afif (on loan from Perak) |
| 15 | DF | (Malaysia) MAS | Syazwan Zaipol (on loan from Perak) |
| 20 | FW | (Brazil) BRA | Ramón (from (Brazil) Juventus) |
| 23 | FW | (Malaysia) MAS | Hafidz Ahmad Kamarudin |
| – | DF | (Malaysia) MAS | Aidil Azuan (from Melaka U19) |

==== Out ====
Note: Flags indicate national team as defined under FIFA eligibility rules; some limited exceptions apply. Players may hold more than one non-FIFA nationality.

| No. | Pos. | Nation | Player |
|---|---|---|---|
| 5 | DF | (Tajikistan) TJK | Siyovush Asrorov |
| 12 | MF | (Ghana) GHA | Thomas Abbey |
| 18 | FW | (Senegal) SEN | Kalidou Yero |

== Competitions ==
=== Malaysia Super League ===
==== Matches ====
| Date | Opponents | H / A | Result F–A | Scorers | League position |
|---|---|---|---|---|---|
| 2 February 2019 | Kedah | H | 0–2 | | 12th |
| 10 February 2019 | Felda United | A | 1–1 | Abbey 36' | 10th |
| 16 February 2019 | Petaling Jaya City | H | 2–3 | Yero 29', Hafiz 52' | 11th |
| 23 February 2019 | PKNS | A | 0–1 | | 11th |
| 2 March 2019 | Pahang | H | 0–3 | | 11th |
| 9 March 2019 | Johor Darul Ta'zim | A | 0–3 | | 11th |
| 30 April 2019 | Kuala Lumpur | H | 4–0 | Pinto 7', Mugenthirran 32', Giancarlo (2) 63', 90+3' | 11th |
| 6 April 2019 | Terengganu | A | 2–1 | Giancarlo (2) 45' (pen.), 46' | 10th |
| 13 April 2019 | Melaka United | H | 1–0 | Khuzaimi 66' (o.g.) | 7th |
| 20 April 2019 | Selangor | A | 1–2 | Fazrul 85' | 9th |
| 27 April 2019 | Perak | H | 0–4 | | 9th |
| 4 May 2019 | Terengganu | H | 2–2 | Aguinaldo 21', Abbey 35' | 9th |
| 14 May 2019 | Perak | A | 1–3 | Pinto 37' | 10th |
| 18 May 2019 | Selangor | H | 1–1 | Mugenthirran 47' | 10th |
| 26 May 2019 | Kuala Lumpur | A | 1–4 | Giancarlo 83' | 11th |
| 14 June 2019 | Johor Darul Ta'zim | H | 1–1 | Ramón 15' | 11th |
| 18 June 2019 | Pahang | A | 0–2 | | 11th |
| 25 June 2019 | PKNS | H | 2–2 | Hafiz 48', Giancarlo 76' | 11th |
| 5 July 2019 | Kedah | A | 1–1 | Giancarlo 81' | 10th |
| 9 July 2019 | Melaka United | A | 1–2 | Giancarlo 13' | 10th |
| 13 July 2019 | Felda United | H | 1–1 | Pinto 81' | 10th |
| 21 July 2019 | Petaling Jaya City | A | 0–1 | | 11th |

==== League table ====
| Pos | Team | Pld | W | D | L | GF | GA | GD | Pts | Qualification or relegation |
|---|---|---|---|---|---|---|---|---|---|---|
| 8 | Petaling Jaya City | 22 | 8 | 2 | 12 | 22 | 29 | −7 | 26 | |
| 9 | PKNS (Note: PKNS F.C. relegated after withdrawing license to complete for the 2020 Malaysia Premier League season as they become feeder club to Selangor FA.) (R) | 22 | 5 | 6 | 11 | 37 | 38 | −1 | 21 | Relegation to Malaysia Premier League |
| 10 | Felda United | 22 | 4 | 7 | 11 | 27 | 43 | −16 | 19 | |
| 11 | PKNP (R) | 22 | 3 | 7 | 12 | 22 | 40 | −18 | 16 | Relegation to Malaysia Premier League |
| 12 | Kuala Lumpur (R) | 22 | 4 | 2 | 16 | 24 | 49 | −25 | 14 | Relegation to Malaysia Premier League |

Source: MFL
Rules for classification: 1) Points; 2) Goal difference; 3) Number of goals scored.
(R) Relegated

=== Malaysia FA Cup ===
==== Knockout phase ====
| Date | Round | Opponents | H / A | Result F–A | Scorers |
|---|---|---|---|---|---|
| 3 April 2019 | Second round | Batu Dua | A | 2–1 | Giancarlo (2) 59', 69' |
| 17 April 2019 | Third round | PDRM | H | 3–2 | Pinto 16', Fazrul 75', Hafiz 89' |
| 30 April 2019 | Quarter-finals 1st leg | Perak | H | 0–0 | |
| 11 May 2019 | Quarter-finals 2nd leg | Perak | A | 1–2 | Giancarlo 72' |

=== Malaysia Cup ===
==== Group stage ====
| Date | Opponents | H / A | Result F–A | Scorers | Group position |
|---|---|---|---|---|---|
| 3 August 2019 | Petaling Jaya City | A | 1–2 | Pedro Victor 38' | 3rd |

| Pos | Team | Pld | W | D | L | GF | GA | GD | Pts | Qualification | JDT | PKNP | PJC | UiTM |
|---|---|---|---|---|---|---|---|---|---|---|---|---|---|---|
| 1 | Johor Darul Ta'zim | 6 | 5 | 1 | 0 | 19 | 8 | +11 | 16 | Advance to knockout stage | — | 5–0 | 4–2 | 3–1 |
| 2 | PKNP | 6 | 3 | 1 | 2 | 12 | 9 | +3 | 10 | Advance to knockout stage | 2–2 | — | 3–0 | 4–0 |
| 3 | Petaling Jaya City | 6 | 3 | 0 | 3 | 9 | 11 | −2 | 9 | | 2–3 | 2–1 | — | 1–0 |
| 4 | UiTM | 6 | 0 | 0 | 6 | 2 | 14 | −12 | 0 | | 1–2 | 0–2 | 0–2 | — |

Source: FAM MFL

== Squad statistics ==
| No. | Pos. | Name | League | | FA Cup | | Malaysia Cup | | Total | | Discipline | |
| No. | Pos. | Name | Apps | Goals | Apps | Goals | Apps | Goals | Apps | Goals | Yellow card | Red card |
|---|---|---|---|---|---|---|---|---|---|---|---|---|
| 1 | GK | (Malaysia) Khairul Thaqif | 8 | 0 | 0 | 0 | 0 | 0 | 8 | 0 | 1 | 0 |
| 2 | MF | (Malaysia) Sukri Hamid | 15 | 0 | 3 | 0 | 0 | 0 | 18 | 0 | 3 | 1 |
| 3 | DF | (Philippines) Amani Aguinaldo | 16 | 1 | 4 | 0 | 1 | 0 | 21 | 1 | 8 | 0 |
| 4 | MF | (Malaysia) Fadhil Idris | 19 | 0 | 4 | 0 | 1 | 0 | 24 | 0 | 7 | 0 |
| 8 | DF | (Brazil) Pedro Victor | 9 | 0 | 1 | 0 | 1 | 1 | 11 | 1 | 3 | 0 |
| 9 | FW | (Malaysia) Mugenthirran Ganesan | 7(1) | 2 | 1 | 0 | 0 | 0 | 8(1) | 2 | 1 | 0 |
| 10 | FW | (Palestine) Yashir Pinto | 21 | 3 | 4 | 1 | 1 | 0 | 26 | 4 | 4 | 0 |
| 12 | DF | (Malaysia) Nazirul Afif | 6(1) | 0 | 0 | 0 | 0 | 0 | 6(1) | 0 | 1 | 0 |
| 13 | MF | (Malaysia) Al-Fateh Afandi | 10(5) | 0 | 3 | 0 | 1 | 0 | 14(5) | 0 | 2 | 0 |
| 14 | MF | (Malaysia) Faizzzwan Dorahim | 4(3) | 0 | 2(2) | 0 | 0 | 0 | 6(5) | 0 | 2 | 0 |
| 15 | DF | (Malaysia) Syazwan Zaipol | 7 | 0 | 0 | 0 | 0 | 0 | 7 | 0 | 1 | 0 |
| 16 | DF | (Malaysia) Naqiuddin Ahmad Kamal | 0 | 0 | 0 | 0 | 0 | 0 | 0 | 0 | 0 | 0 |
| 17 | DF | (Malaysia) Ezanie Mat Salleh | 11(3) | 0 | 2 | 0 | 0(1) | 0 | 13(4) | 0 | 4 | 0 |
| 19 | MF | (Malaysia) Fazrul Hazli | 2(10) | 1 | 0(2) | 1 | 1 | 0 | 3(12) | 2 | 1 | 0 |
| 20 | FW | (Malaysia) Khairul Asyraf | 1(10) | 0 | 0 | 0 | 1 | 0 | 2(10) | 0 | 0 | 0 |
| 21 | MF | (Malaysia) Hafiz Kamal | 1(8) | 0 | 0(1) | 0 | 0 | 0 | 1(9) | 0 | 3 | 0 |
| 22 | GK | (Malaysia) Asyraaf Omar | 12 | 0 | 4 | 0 | 0 | 0 | 16 | 0 | 0 | 0 |
| 23 | | (Malaysia) Hafidz Kamarudin | 0 | 0 | 0 | 0 | 0(1) | 0 | 0(1) | 0 | 0 | 0 |
| 25 | FW | (Malaysia) Hafiz Ramdan | 18 | 2 | 4 | 1 | 1 | 0 | 23 | 3 | 3 | 0 |
| 26 | DF | (Malaysia) Rafiq Faeez | 1(3) | 0 | 0 | 0 | 0 | 0 | 1(3) | 0 | 0 | 0 |
| 27 | DF | (Malaysia) Filemon Anyie | 13(2) | 0 | 1 | 0 | 1 | 0 | 15(2) | 0 | 2 | 0 |
| 28 | MF | (Malaysia) Ibni Khozaimi | 5(10) | 0 | 1(3) | 0 | 0 | 0 | 6(13) | 0 | 1 | 0 |
| 29 | FW | (Brazil) Ramón | 8 | 1 | 0 | 0 | 0 | 0 | 8 | 1 | 0 | 0 |
| 30 | FW | (Brazil) Giancarlo | 18 | 8 | 4 | 3 | 0 | 0 | 22 | 11 | 5 | 0 |
| 31 | MF | (Malaysia) Mukhairi Ajmal | 0(2) | 0 | 0 | 0 | 0 | 0 | 0(2) | 0 | 0 | 0 |
| 33 | GK | (Malaysia) Shafiq Afifi | 2 | 0 | 0 | 0 | 1 | 0 | 3 | 0 | 0 | 0 |
| 34 | DF | (Malaysia) Farid Nezal | 7(1) | 0 | 2(1) | 0 | 0 | 0 | 9(2) | 0 | 2 | 0 |
| 35 | DF | (Malaysia) Sabir Abdul Salim | 0 | 0 | 0 | 0 | 1 | 0 | 1 | 0 | 0 | 0 |
| 44 | FW | (Malaysia) Alif Safwan | 0(1) | 0 | 0(1) | 0 | 0 | 0 | 0(2) | 0 | 0 | 0 |
Players who have played for PKNP this season but have left the club:
| 5 | DF | (Tajikistan) Siyovush Asrorov | 6(1) | 0 | 0 | 0 | 0 | 0 | 6(1) | 0 | 1 | 0 |
| 12 | MF | (Ghana) Thomas Abbey | 12 | 2 | 4 | 0 | 0 | 0 | 16 | 2 | 2 | 0 |
| 18 | FW | (Senegal) Kalidou Yero | 2(1) | 1 | 0 | 0 | 0 | 0 | 2(1) | 1 | 0 | 0 |

Statistics accurate as of 3 August 2019.
