= List of Malaysian football first transfers 2019 =

This is a list of Malaysian football transfers for the 2019 first transfer window. Only transfers featuring Malaysia Super League and Malaysia Premier League are listed. For the Malaysia M3 League featured for selected clubs only.

The transfer window opened 29 November 2018 and closed 20 February 2019.

== Malaysia Super League ==
Note: Flags indicate national team as has been defined under FIFA eligibility rules. Players may hold more than one non-FIFA nationality.

=== Felda United ===
In:

No.	Pos.	Nation	Player
2	DF	MAS	Arif Fadzilah (from Terengganu II)
4	DF	MAS	Raffi Nagoorgani (from PKNP)
6	DF	MAS	Faiz Mazlan (from youth system)
7	MF	MAS	Aizat Mukhlis (from youth system)
8	MF	BRA	Jocinei (from (Brazil) Criciúma)
10	MF	JPN	Kei Ikeda (on loan from (Japan) Sagan Tosu)
12	FW	MAS	Azim Rahim (from Felcra)
13	DF	JPN	Masaki Watanabe (from Perlis)
14	MF	MAS	Sadam Hashim (from UiTM)
15	DF	MAS	Azarul Nazarith (from youth system)
17	DF	MAS	Zulhelmi Asyraf (from Young Fighters)
18	DF	MAS	Jadid Ilias (from Sultan Idris Education University)
20	GK	MAS	Norazlan Razali (from Selangor)
21	MF	MAS	Jasazrin Jamaluddin (from Penang)
22	FW	BHR	Jaycee John (from (Thailand) Bangkok United)
23	FW	MAS	Chanturu Suppiah (from Melaka United)
24	GK	MAS	Syah Fadil (from Young Fighters)
29	MF	MAS	Nasril Izzat (from Young Fighters)
30	DF	MAS	Haziq Puad (from Kelantan)

Out:

No.	Pos.	Nation	Player
1	GK	MAS	Kalamullah Al-Hafiz (to Petaling Jaya City)
3	DF	MAS	Fazly Alias (to Banggol Tokku FC)
8	MF	MAS	Khairu Azrin (to Terengganu)
9	FW	BRA	Thiago Fernandes (to (Bahrain) Manama)
10	FW	BRA	Gilberto Fortunato (to (Bolivia) Sport Boys Warnes)
11	MF	MAS	Wan Zack Haikal (to Selangor)
12	DF	MAS	Shukor Adan (to Melaka United)
13	MF	MAS	Syamim Yahya (to Terengganu)
14	DF	MAS	Azreen Zulkafali (to Selangor)
16	MF	MAS	Stuart Wark (to Penang)
17	MF	PHI	Iain Ramsay (to (Thailand) Sukhothai)
18	DF	MAS	Irwan Fadzli
20	DF	MAS	Wan Amirul Afiq (to Melaka United)
21	DF	MAS	Prabakaran Kanadasan (to Selangor)
23	DF	MAS	Safwan Hashim
28	DF	MAS	Alif Yusof (to Kedah)
30	GK	MAS	Farizal Harun (to Selangor)

=== Johor Darul Ta'zim ===
In:

No.	Pos.	Nation	Player
33	DF	BRA	Maurício (from (Italy) Lazio)
17	MF	ESP	Aarón Ñíguez (from (Spain) Real Oviedo)
19	FW	MAS	Akhyar Rashid (from Kedah)
8	FW	BRA	Diogo (from (Thailand) Buriram United)
6	DF	MAS	Syazwan Andik (from Kuala Lumpur)
18	MF	ARG	Leandro Velázquez (from (Colombia) Rionegro Águilas)

Out:

No.	Pos.	Nation	Player
18	DF	MAS	Mahali Jasuli (on loan to PKNS)
5	FW	ARG	Fernando Elizari (to (Chile) O'Higgins)
6	DF	BRA	Marcos António (retired)
8	MF	MAS	Safiq Rahim (to Melaka United)
–	MF	MAS	Gopinathan Ramachandra (to Melaka United, previously on loan)
18	FW	ARG	Fernando Márquez (to (Argentina) Defensa y Justicia)
–	MF	MAS	Amirul Hadi (to Johor Darul Ta'zim II)
10	FW	FRA	Harry Novillo (to (Canada) Montreal Impact)
–	MF	MAS	Chanturu Suppiah (to Felda United, previously on loan at Melaka United)
25	MF	MAS	Junior Eldstål (retired)
–	MF	MAS	Fazly Mazlan (to Johor Darul Ta'zim II)
–	MF	ESP	Aarón Ñíguez (released)

=== Kedah ===
In:

No.	Pos.	Nation	Player
11	DF	SGP	Shakir Hamzah (from (Singapore) Home United)
14	FW	MAS	Thanabalan Nadarajah (from Negeri Sembilan)
19	MF	MAS	Syahrul Azwari (from Melaka United)
25	DF	MAS	Azmeer Yusof (from Kuala Lumpur)
23	MF	MAS	Shahrul Igwan (from Selangor)
6	MF	IRQ	Anmar Almubaraki (from (Thailand) Army United)
21	MF	MAS	Fayadh Zulkifli (from youth system)
9	FW	ESP	Fernando Rodríguez (from (Indonesia) Mitra Kukar)
4	MF	MAS	Azamuddin Akil (from Selangor)
3	DF	BRA	Renan Alves (from (Indonesia) Borneo)
8	FW	MAS	Zaquan Adha (from Kuala Lumpur)
28	DF	MAS	Alif Yusof (from Felda United)
10	FW	ARG	Jonatan Bauman (from (Indonesia) Persib Bandung)

Out:

No.	Pos.	Nation	Player
28	MF	MAS	Zulfahamzie Tarmizi (released)
11	FW	MAS	Zafuan Azeman (to Penang)
23	MF	MAS	Hanif Dzahir (released)
30	MF	IDN	Andik Vermansyah (to (Indonesia) Madura United)
22	MF	MAS	Syazwan Zainon (to Selangor)
27	MF	MAS	Ariff Farhan (to PKNS)
18	MF	MAS	Abdul Halim Saari (to Selangor)
14	MF	MAS	Akram Mahinan (to PKNS)
20	FW	MAS	Akhyar Rashid (to Johor Darul Ta'zim)
9	FW	BRA	Paulo Rangel (to (Brazil) Paysandu)
10	MF	BRA	Sandro (to Selangor)
8	MF	KOS	Liridon Krasniqi (to Melaka United)
4	DF	PHI	Álvaro Silva (to (Philippines) Ceres–Negros)
–	GK	MAS	Farhan Abu Bakar (on loan to PKNS)

=== Kuala Lumpur ===
In:

No.	Pos.	Nation	Player
22	FW	MAS	Arif Anwar (from Petaling Jaya Rangers)
9	FW	NED	Sylvano Comvalius (from (Thailand) Suphanburi)
7	MF	JPN	Ryutaro Karube (from (Thailand) Chainat Hornbill)
1	GK	MAS	Faridzuean Kamaruddin (from Kelantan)
15	DF	MAS	Khair Jones (from Melaka United)
3	DF	MAS	Fitri Omar (from Terengganu)
29	DF	MAS	Alif Samsudin (from Felcra)
6	MF	MAS	Haziq Mu'iz (from Felcra)
16	MF	PHI	Luke Woodland (from (Thailand) Suphanburi)
–	DF	MAS	Azmi Muslim (from Perlis)

Out:

No.	Pos.	Nation	Player
26	DF	MAS	Hazwan Rahman (released)
12	DF	UZB	Bobirjon Akbarov (released)
2	DF	MAS	Farid Ramli (released)
9	FW	MAS	Ibrahim Syaihul (released)
25	DF	MAS	Azmeer Yusof (to Kedah)
3	DF	MAS	Saifulnizam Miswan (released)
8	FW	MAS	Zaquan Adha (to Kedah)
6	DF	MAS	Syazwan Andik (to Johor Darul Ta'zim)
16	DF	IDN	Achmad Jufriyanto (released)
29	GK	MAS	Khatul Anuar (on loan to UKM)
7	MF	BRA	Juninho (released)

=== Melaka United ===
In:

No.	Pos.	Nation	Player
1	GK	MAS	Syafizullah Wahab (from SAMB)
21	GK	MAS	Oscar Wong Tse-Yeung (from Hong Kong Rangers)
31	GK	MAS	Izarul Adli (youth system)
6	DF	MAS	Jang Suk-won (from (South Korea) Seongnam)
13	DF	MAS	Razman Roslan (from Selangor)
15	DF	MAS	Raimi Md. Nor (from Penang)
18	DF	MAS	Wan Amirul Afiq (from Felda United)
23	DF	MAS	Zharif Desa (from Penang)
26	DF	MAS	Ubaidullah Rahman (from Felcra)
27	DF	MAS	Khuzaimi Piee (from PKNP)
7	MF	MNE	Darko Marković (from (Bosnia and Herzegovina) Željezničar Sarajevo)
8	MF	MAS	Safiq Rahim (from Johor Darul Ta'zim)
10	MF	KOS	Liridon Krasniqi (from Kedah)
12	MF	MAS	Shukor Adan (from Felda United)
14	MF	MAS	Kavishkumar Manimaharan (from (Japan) Tokai FC)
16	MF	MAS	Saiful Ridzuwan (from Selangor)
20	MF	MAS	Nazrin Nawi (from Perak)
24	MF	MAS	Gopinathan Ramachandran (from Johor Darul Ta'zim, previously on loan)
29	MF	MAS	Deevan Raj (from PKNP)
9	FW	BRA	Casagrande (from Felcra)
11	FW	PHI	Patrick Reichelt (from Ceres–Negros)
13	FW	MAS	Wan Mohd Syukri (from MIFA)
22	FW	MAS	Ramzi Haziq (from Johor Darul Ta'zim II)
32	FW	MAS	Faizal Talib (youth system)

Out:

No.	Pos.	Nation	Player
1	GK	MAS	Fazli Paat (released)
11	GK	MAS	Zamir Selamat (to Batu Dua)
4	DF	MAS	Shazlan Alias (released)
18	DF	MAS	Syawal Norsam (released)
27	DF	MAS	Puaneswaran Gunasekaran (released)
15	DF	FRA	Steven Thicot (to (United States) Charlotte Independence)
5	DF	MAS	Nicholas Swirad (to PKNS)
21	DF	MAS	Azmi Muslim (to Perlis)
26	DF	MAS	Khair Jones (to Kuala Lumpur)
16	MF	SGP	Shahdan Sulaiman (loan return to (Singapore) Tampines Rovers)
23	MF	MAS	Chanturu Suppiah (to Felda United, previously on loan from Johor Darul Ta'zim)
7	MF	MAS	Surendran Ravindran (released])
30	MF	MAS	Veenod Subramaniam (to Petaling Jaya City)
10	FW	NGA	Ifedayo Olusegun (released])
2	FW	MAS	Akmal Ishak (released)
17	FW	BLR	Yahor Zubovich (to (Belarus) Dinamo Minsk)
29	FW	KOR	Lee Chang-hoon (to PDRM)
19	FW	MAS	Fauzi Roslan (to Kelantan)
6	MF	MAS	Sivanesan Shanmugan (to Penang)
–	FW	MAS	Syahrul Azwari (to Kedah)
13	FW	MAS	Fakri Saarani (released)
25	FW	MAS	Farderin Kadir (SAMB)

=== Pahang ===
In:

No.	Pos.	Nation	Player
3	DF	FRA	Hérold Goulon (from (Cyprus) Ermis Aradippou)
15	MF	IDN	Saddil Ramdani (from (Indonesia) Persela Lamongan)
10	FW	NGA	Dickson Nwakaeme (from (France) Angers)
11	FW	BRA	Zé Eduardo (from (Brazil) Oeste)
29	MF	MAS	Nik Sharif Haseefy (youth system)

Out:

No.	Pos.	Nation	Player
10	FW	BRA	Patrick Cruz (to (Thailand) Chonburi)
29	FW	NGA	Austin Amutu (to (Egypt) Al-Masry)
11	MF	CAN	Issey Nakajima-Farran (to (Canada) Pacific)

=== Perak ===
In:

No.	Pos.	Nation	Player
16	MF	MAS	Partiban Janasekaran (from Terengganu)
6	DF	AUS	Zac Anderson (from PKNS)
28	DF	MAS	Nazirul Afif (youth system)
30	DF	MAS	Izzat Ramlee (youth system)
29	FW	MAS	Shahrel Fikri (on loan from PKNP)

Out:

No.	Pos.	Nation	Player
30	FW	MAS	Nizad Ayub (released)
20	MF	MAS	Nazrin Nawi (to Melaka United)
5	DF	LBN	Jad Noureddine (to (Lebanon) Al-Safa')
27	MF	MAS	Hafiz Kamal (to PKNP)
13	FW	MAS	Khairul Asyraf (to PKNP)
6	DF	MAS	Rafiq Faeez (to PKNP)

=== Petaling Jaya City ===
In:

No.	Pos.	Nation	Player
2	DF	MAS	Annas Rahmat (from PKNS)
4	DF	PHI	Joshua Grommen (from (Philippines) Davao Aguilas)
9	FW	BRA	Pedro Henrique (from (South Korea) Daejeon Citizen)
10	FW	MAS	Safee Sali (from Perlis)
11	DF	MAS	Aizulridzwan Razali (from Negeri Sembilan)
13	MF	MAS	Thivandran Karnan (from Penang)
14	FW	MAS	Yugan Poobathy (youth system)
16	MF	MAS	Sivakumar Munusamy (from PKNS)
19	FW	MAS	Marcus Mah Yung Jian (from DBKL)
22	GK	MAS	Kalamullah Al-Hafiz (from Felda United)
23	MF	MAS	Veenod Subramaniam (from Melaka United)
27	FW	MAS	A. Thamil Arasu (from Petaling Jaya Rangers)
30	MF	BRA	Serginho (from (Brazil) Bangu)
–	FW	BRA	Giancarlo (from (Brazil) Concórdia)

Out:

No.	Pos.	Nation	Player
8	FW	FRA	L´Imam Seydi (to Batu Dua, previously on loan from Kelantan)
6	FW	MAS	Danasehar Ramachandran (released)
4	MF	MAS	Thinaadkaran Mutiah (released)
26	MF	MAS	Tamilselvan Sankupillai (released)
18	MF	MAS	Mahathevan Gengatharan (released)
19	MF	MAS	S. Dhaya Naidu (released)
14	FW	MAS	J. Satrunan Pillai (released)
9	FW	MAS	Mugenthirran Ganesan (to PKNP)
13	FW	MAS	Wan Mohd Syukri (to Melaka United)
10	FW	LBR	Kpah Sherman (to PKNS)
–	FW	BRA	Giancarlo (on loan to PKNP)

=== PKNP ===
In:

No.	Pos.	Nation	Player
1	GK	MAS	Khairul Thaqif (from Shah Alam Antlers)
3	DF	PHI	Amani Aguinaldo (loan from (Philippines) Ceres–Negros)
5	DF	TJK	Siyovush Asrorov (from (Tajikistan) Istiklol)
7	FW	MAS	Hasnan Mat Isa (from Petaling Jaya Rangers)
9	FW	MAS	Mugenthirran Ganesan (from MIFA)
10	MF	PLE	Yashir Pinto (from (Chile) Coquimbo Unido)
12	MF	GHA	Thomas Abbey (from (Egypt) Ismaily)
18	FW	SEN	Kalidou Yero (from (Portugal) Cova da Piedade)
19	MF	MAS	Fazrul Hazli (from Felda United)
20	FW	MAS	Khairul Asyraf (from Perak)
21	MF	MAS	Hafiz Kamal (from Perak)
26	DF	MAS	Rafiq Faeez (from Perak)
30	FW	BRA	Giancarlo (loan from Petaling Jaya City)

Out:

No.	Pos.	Nation	Player
1	GK	MAS	Bryan See (to (Thailand) Bangkok)
4	DF	LVA	Ritus Krjauklis
—	DF	KOR	Kim Sang-woo
6	DF	CTA	Franklin Anzité (to Selangor United)
11	MF	MAS	Irwan Syazmin (to UKM)
13	MF	MAS	Deevan Raj (to Melaka United)
16	DF	MAS	Raffi Nagoorgani (to Felda United)
18	DF	MAS	Ganiesh Gunasegaran (to Petaling Jaya City)
19	FW	MAS	Shahrel Fikri (loan to Perak)
21	MF	MAS	Norhakim Isa (to Selangor)
23	GK	MAS	Syazani Puat (to Perlis)
27	DF	MAS	Khuzaimi Piee (to Melaka United)

=== PKNS ===
In:

No.	Pos.	Nation	Player
21	GK	MAS	Farhan Abu Bakar (on loan from Kedah)
4	DF	KGZ	Tamirlan Kozubaev (from (Kyrgyzstan) Dordoi Bishkek)
6	DF	MAS	Nicholas Swirad (from Melaka United)
8	MF	MAS	Tommy Mawat (from Petaling Jaya Rangers)
9	FW	LBR	Kpah Sherman (from MIFA)
13	FW	MAS	Surendran Rasiah
14	MF	MAS	Akram Mahinan (from Kedah)
17	DF	MAS	Fandi Othman (from Felcra)
20	FW	ARG	Gabriel Guerra (from (Argentina) Huracán)
25	DF	MAS	Shahrom Kalam (from Felcra)
26	FW	MAS	Shafiq Shaharudin (from Kelantan)
27	MF	MAS	Ariff Farhan (from Kedah)
29	FW	CAM	Chan Vathanaka (from (Cambodia) Boeung Ket Angkor)
30	DF	MAS	Shivan Pillay (youth system)
–	MF	MAS	Ariff Ar-Rasyid Ariffin (youth system)
–	DF	MAS	Kannan Kalaiselvan (on loan from Selangor)

Out:

No.	Pos.	Nation	Player
25	GK	MAS	Shahril Saa'ri (to Perlis)
2	DF	MAS	K. Reuben (to UKM)
4	DF	MAS	Daniel Ting (retired)
8	DF	AUS	Zac Anderson (to Perak)
17	DF	MAS	Azmizi Azmi (to Perlis)
24	DF	MAS	Annas Rahmat (to Petaling Jaya City)
5	MF	MAS	Shahrul Azhar (released)
11	MF	MAS	Nazrin Syamsul (to Perlis)
14	FW	MAS	Khyril Muhymeen (to Perlis)
16	MF	MAS	Nurridzuan Abu Hassan (to Selangor)
18	MF	MAS	Sivakumar Munusamy (to Petaling Jaya City)
30	MF	SGP	Faris Ramli (to Perlis)
19	MF	BRA	Bruno (to (Indonesia) Persija Jakarta)
10	FW	MAS	Safee Sali (to Perlis)
29	FW	BRA	Rafael Ramazotti (to (Singapore) Hougang United)
17	DF	MAS	Fandi Othman (on loan to Selangor)

=== Selangor ===
In:

No.	Pos.	Nation	Player
5	DF	AUS	Taylor Regan (from (Australia) Adelaide United)
8	FW	MAS	Khyril Muhymeen (from Perlis)
9	MF	BRA	Sandro (from Selangor)
9	FW	GRN	Antonio German (from (India) Gokulam Kerala)
11	MF	MAS	Wan Zack Haikal (from Felda United)
13	MF	MAS	Latiff Suhaimi (from Terengganu)
14	MF	BRA	Endrick (from Felcra)
15	MF	MAS	Faiz Nasir (from Terengganu)
16	MF	MAS	Nurridzuan Abu Hassan (from PKNS)
18	MF	MAS	Abdul Halim Saari (from Kedah)
19	DF	MAS	Kanadasan Prabakaran (from Felda United)
21	MF	MAS	Norhakim Isa (from PKNP)
22	MF	MAS	Syazwan Zainon (from Kedah)
25	DF	MAS	Azreen Zulkafali (from Felda United)
26	MF	VIE	Michal Nguyễn (from (Thailand) Air Force Central)
28	DF	MAS	Asraff Haykal (youth system)
30	GK	MAS	Farizal Harun (from Felda United)
–	DF	MAS	Fandi Othman (on loan from PKNS)

Out:

No.	Pos.	Nation	Player
4	MF	MAS	Abdul Halim Zainal (to Negeri Sembilan)
6	MF	IDN	Evan Dimas (to (Indonesia) Barito Putera)
8	MF	MAS	Saiful Ridzuwan (to Melaka United)
9	FW	GRN	Antonio German (released)
12	FW	MAS	Azamuddin Akil (to Kedah)
13	DF	MAS	Razman Roslan (to Melaka United)
14	MF	ESP	Alfonso de la Cruz (to (Indonesia) PSS Sleman)
18	MF	IDN	Ilham Armaiyn (to (Indonesia) Bhayangkara)
19	MF	MAS	Joseph Kalang Tie (to Kuching)
21	GK	MAS	Norazlan Razali (to Felda United)
23	DF	BRA	Willian Pacheco (to (Indonesia) Bali United)
26	DF	MAS	Fairuz Abdul Aziz
23	DF	BRA	Willian Pacheco (to (Indonesia) Bali United)
29	MF	MAS	Shahrul Igwan (to Kedah)
3	DF	MAS	Kannan Kalaiselvan (on loan to PKNS)
5	DF	MAS	Amirul Ashraf (on loan to UiTM)
8	MF	MAS	Faizzudin Abidin (on loan to Penang)
28	MF	MAS	Asraff Haykal (on loan to UiTM)

=== Terengganu ===
In:

No.	Pos.	Nation	Player
1	GK	MAS	Shafawi Mohamad (youth system)
25	GK	MAS	Ilham Amirullah (from Negeri Sembilan)
3	DF	MAS	Muhammad Mohd Faudzi (from Terengganu II)
18	DF	MAS	Azalinullah Alias (from Petaling Jaya Rangers)
11	MF	MAS	Syamim Yahya (from Felda United)
13	MF	MAS	Khairu Azrin (from Felda United)
15	MF	UZB	Sanjar Shaakhmedov (from (Uzbekistan) Lokomotiv Tashkent)
16	MF	MAS	Khairul Izuan (from Negeri Sembilan)
19	MF	MAS	Khairul Anwar (from Negeri Sembilan)
20	MF	MAS	Sharin Sapien (from Terengganu II)

Out:

No.	Pos.	Nation	Player
16	MF	MAS	Partiban Janasekaran (to Perak)
1	GK	MAS	Faizal Yusoff
21	GK	MAS	Syazwan Yusoff (to Selangor United)
3	DF	MAS	Fitri Omar (to Kuala Lumpur)
25	MF	MAS	Azi Shahril Azmi
18	MF	MAS	Fauzi Kadar
15	MF	MAS	Faiz Nasir (to Selangor)
13	DF	MAS	Latiff Suhaimi (to Selangor)
19	MF	KOR	Do Dong-Hyun (to (South Korea) Gyeongnam)

== Malaysia Premier League ==
=== Johor Darul Ta'zim II ===
In:

No.	Pos.	Nation	Player
8	DF	MAS	Nurfikry Razali (from Johor Darul Ta'zim III)
9	FW	ARG	Lucas Ontivero (from (Argentina) Chacarita Juniors)
12	FW	MAS	Kumaahran Sathasivam (from Johor Darul Ta'zim)
13	MF	MAS	Yogaraj Murugan (from Johor Darul Ta'zim III)
22	FW	LBN	Mohammed Ghaddar (from Kelantan)
42	DF	MAS	Syazwan Andik (from Kuala Lumpur)

Out:

No.	Pos.	Nation	Player
29	GK	MAS	K. Sasi Kumar (released)
23	MF	MAS	Ramzi Haziq (to Melaka United)
41	MF	MAS	Nazmi Faiz (loan return to Johor Darul Ta'zim)
46	MF	MAS	Junior Eldstål (released)

=== Kelantan ===
In:

No.	Pos.	Nation	Player
30	GK	MAS	Arif Abdullah (from (Thailand) Yala United)
22	GK	MAS	Saufi Muhammad (from Shahzan Muda)
21	FW	MAS	Zulfahmi Awang (end of loan to D'AR Wanderers)
19	FW	MAS	Fauzi Roslan (from Pahang)
28	MF	MAS	Amirul Shafik (from Kelantan United)
7	MF	BRA	Flávio (from Negeri Sembilan)
10	MF	AFG	Mustafa Zazai (from (Thailand) Phrae United)
14	FW	URU	Raúl Tarragona (from (South Korea) Ansan Greeners)
8	MF	MAS	David Rowley (from Negeri Sembilan)

Out:

No.	Pos.	Nation	Player
20	MF	MAS	Haikal Nazri (released)
17	MF	KGZ	Bakhtiyar Duyshobekov (to (Bangladesh) Bashundhara Kings)
18	MF	MAS	Amir Zikri (to Kelantan United)
7	FW	MAS	Fakhrul Zaman (to Kelantan United)
9	FW	BRA	Cristiano Santos (released)
1	GK	MAS	Shahrizan Ismail (to Kelantan United)
10	MF	MAS	Farhan Muhammad (to PDRM, previously on loan at D'AR Wanderers)
–	FW	FRA	L'Imam Seydi (to Batu Dua, previously on loan at MIFA)
8	FW	MAS	Shafiq Shaharudin (to PKNS)
12	DF	MAS	Haziq Puad (to Felda United)
28	MF	MAS	Faizol Nazlin (to Kelantan United)
16	MF	MAS	Badhri Radzi (to Perlis)
22	GK	MAS	Faridzuean Kamaruddin (to Kuala Lumpur)
26	MF	MAS	Fadhilah Pauzi (to Perlis)
35	GK	MAS	Fikri Che Soh (on loan to Perlis)
33	GK	MAS	Damien Lim Chien Khai (on loan from PKNS)

=== Negeri Sembilan ===
In:

No.	Pos.	Nation	Player
1	GK	MAS	Hamka Daud (youth system)
22	GK	MAS	Fadzley Rahim (from Felcra)
31	GK	MAS	Ayyub Hakimi (youth system)
3	DF	MAS	Adam Othman (from UKM)
5	DF	MAS	Norhafiz Zamani (from Penang)
15	DF	MAS	Danish Haziq (youth system)
23	DF	MAS	Izaaq Izhan (from PDRM)
28	DF	MAS	Azrul Nizam (from Marcerra Kuantan)
30	DF	BRA	Matheus Vila (from (Brazil) Fluminense do Itaum)
4	MF	MAS	Halim Zainal (from Selangor)
7	MF	JPN	Shunsuke Nakatake (from PDRM)
11	MF	MAS	Dzulfahmi Abdul Hadi (from Felcra)
14	MF	MAS	Danial Hadri (from Jangs Trooper)
16	MF	MAS	Durrkeswaran Ganasan (youth system)
32	MF	MAS	Farouq Adam Khan (youth system)
9	FW	MAS	Almir (from (Thailand) Sisaket)
10	FW	SLE	Thomas Koroma (from (Finland) TP-47)
13	FW	MAS	Ridzuan Abdunloh (from Felda United)

Out:

No.	Pos.	Nation	Player
1	GK	MAS	Saiful Amar (to Puchong Fuerza)
27	GK	MAS	Ilham Amirullah (to Terengganu)
3	DF	BRA	Alex Moraes (released)
4	DF	MAS	Fauzan Fauzi (to PDRM)
5	DF	MAS	Rizal Fahmi (to Selangor United)
6	DF	MAS	Nasriq Baharom (to Perlis)
11	DF	MAS	Aizulridzwan Razali (to Petaling Jaya City)
13	DF	MAS	Hazrul Mustafa (released)
7	MF	BRA	Flávio (to Kelantan)
9	MF	MAS	Syahid Zaidon (to PDRM)
15	MF	MAS	Fauzan Dzulkifli (to Selangor United)
19	MF	MAS	Khairul Anwar (to Terengganu)
20	MF	MAS	Faizal Abu Bakar (released)
23	MF	MAS	Nizam Ruslan (released)
25	MF	MAS	Thanabalan Nadarajah (to Kedah)
26	MF	MAS	David Rowley (to Kelantan)
29	MF	KOR	Kim Do-heon (released)
10	FW	ARG	Nicolás Vélez (to (Portugal) Belenenses)
18	FW	MAS	Khairul Izuan (to Terengganu)
30	FW	MAS	Fakrul Aiman (to PDRM)
58	FW	PHI	Ángel Guirado (released)

=== PDRM ===
In:

No.	Pos.	Nation	Player
1	GK	MAS	Amirul Hafiz
2	DF	MAS	Zain Azraai
8	DF	MAS	Rainol Massat
12	FW	MAS	Jasper Daring (youth system)
14	DF	MAS	Raja Shahrulnizam
17	DF	MAS	Syazwan Azizan
21	DF	MAS	Fazli Azrin
22	GK	MAS	Farzly Muhammad (from Hanelang)
3	DF	MAS	Hazwan Rahman (from Kuala Lumpur)
5	DF	MAS	Fauzan Fauzi (from Negeri Sembilan)
15	FW	KOR	Lee Chang-hoon (from Melaka United)
20	FW	MAS	Farhan Muhammad (from D'AR Wanderers)
23	MF	MAS	Ezrie Shafizie (from MOF)
24	MF	MAS	Syahid Zaidon (from Negeri Sembilan)
28	MF	BRA	Andrezinho (from Marcerra Kuantan)
30	MF	MAS	Fakrul Aiman (from Negeri Sembilan)
13	FW	LBR	Patrick Ronaldinho (from (Malta) Floriana)
33	GK	MAS	Shahril Saa'ri (from Perlis)

Out:

No.	Pos.	Nation	Player
1	GK	MAS	Khairul Nidzam (released)
3	DF	MAS	Hariz Irffan (released)
4	MF	MAS	Rafizi Zahari (released)
5	DF	MAS	Fekry Tajudin (released)
8	FW	MAS	Nabil Latpi (released)
12	DF	MAS	Kamal Rodiarjat (released)
14	MF	MAS	Nazri Kamal (released)
16	DF	MAS	Ilham Yusof (released)
17	DF	MAS	Hariz Fazrin (to PDRM)
21	MF	MAS	Baqiuddin Shamsudin (released)
23	MF	MAS	Hazwan Fakhrullah (released)
24	MF	MAS	Nizam Rodzi (released)
25	GK	MAS	Sheril Anuar (released)
31	GK	MAS	Arif Izwan (released)
26	DF	MAS	Ameer Syafeeq (released)
7	MF	JPN	Shunsuke Nakatake (to Negeri Sembilan)
6	DF	MAS	Izaaq Izhan (to Negeri Sembilan)
5	MF	MNE	Benjamin Rexhoviq (released)
10	MF	KOR	Sim Woon-sub (to (Armenia) Ararat Yerevan)
30	FW	ROU	Petrișor Voinea (released)

=== Penang ===
In:

No.	Pos.	Nation	Player
9	FW	AUS	Ndumba Makeche (from (Australia) South Melbourne)
10	FW	ARG	Julián Bottaro (from (Argentina) Huracán)
21	DF	MAS	Hasrul Che Halim (youth system)
27	DF	MAS	Asyraf Rojani (youth system)
24	MF	MAS	Som Keat Preseart (unattached)
18	FW	MAS	Rahizi Razib (from Terengganu City)
16	MF	HAI	Sébastien Thurière (from Terengganu II)
8	MF	MAS	Dhiyaulrahman Hasry (from Terengganu II)
3	MF	MAS	Lim Yong Sheng (unattached)
19	MF	MAS	Sivanesan Shanmugan (from Melaka United)
17	DF	MAS	Tunku Hidayat (from MOF)
26	DF	MAS	Segar Arumugam (from MOF)
6	MF	MAS	Stuart Wark (from Felda United)
20	FW	MAS	Ramze Othman (unattached)
1	GK	MAS	Syamim Othman (from Felcra)
22	GK	MAS	Faizal Yusoff (from Terengganu)
28	DF	MAS	Khairul Rosmadi (unattached)
12	MF	MAS	Al-Hafiz Harun (unattached)
23	MF	MAS	Ikhmal Ibrahim (unattached)
2	DF	MAS	Che Safwan Hazman (from Perlis)
15	DF	MAS	Aziz Ismail (from Perlis)
29	FW	MAS	Afiq Azmi (from Puchong Fuerza)

Out:

No.	Pos.	Nation	Player
1	GK	MAS	Muhammad Al-Hafiz (released)
–	DF	MAS	Arman Fareez (released, previously on loan at UiTM)
25	GK	MAS	Amirul Asyraf (released)
19	DF	MAS	Redzuan Suhaidi (released)
15	DF	MAS	Raimi Md. Nor (to Melaka United)
23	DF	MAS	Zharif Desa (to Melaka United)
17	MF	MAS	Thivandran Karnan (to Petaling Jaya City)
18	DF	NGA	Ugo Ukah (released)
8	MF	MAS	Syukur Saidin (to Perlis)
3	DF	MAS	Norhafiz Zamani (to Negeri Sembilan)
13	MF	MAS	Faiz Subri (released)
7	MF	MAS	Lot Abu Hassan (to Puchong Fuerza)
6	DF	MAS	Yong Kuong Yong (released)
5	MF	MAS	Azidan Sarudin (released)
12	MF	MAS	Junaidi Shafiai (released)
9	FW	NGA	Chidi Edeh (released)
10	FW	GAM	Sanna Nyassi (released)
21	MF	MAS	Jasazrin Jamaluddin (to Felda United)
24	MF	MAS	Fitri Shazwan (released)
20	FW	MAS	Alafi Mahmud (released)

=== Sabah ===
In:

No.	Pos.	Nation	Player
5	MF	MAS	Muhammad Safar (from PKNP)
6	DF	KOR	Park Tae-soo (from (South Korea) Hwaseong)
9	FW	BRA	Luiz Júnior (from (Egypt) Mokawloon)
10	FW	SRB	Luka Milunović (from (Serbia) Voždovac)
24	MF	MAS	Syukri Baharun (youth system)
29	DF	MAS	Ranilson Batuil (youth system)

Out:

No.	Pos.	Nation	Player
5	DF	ZAM	Francis Kasonde (released)
6	DF	MAS	Darwira Sazan (released)
9	FW	PUR	Héctor Ramos (released)
11	DF	MAS	Alto Linus (released)
17	FW	MAS	Leopold Alphonso (released)
51	MF	JPN	Keisuke Ogawa (released)

=== Sarawak ===
In:

No.	Pos.	Nation	Player
2	MF	IDN	Rian Firmansyah (from (Indonesia) Persipon Pontianak)
5	DF	BRA	Pedro Henrique
6	FW	MAS	Awangku Hamirullizam (from Petaling Jaya Rangers)
7	FW	MAS	Shamie Iszuan (from Petaling Jaya Rangers)
10	FW	BIH	Muamer Salibašić
12	DF	MAS	Firdaus Fauzi (youth system)
15	MF	MAS	Mark Damian James (youth system)
16	MF	MAS	Asrin Kalam (from Perlis)
18	FW	BRA	Hudson Jesus (from (Portugal) Covilhã)
19	FW	MAS	Amar Muaz (youth system)
20	MF	MAS	Adam Shreen (from Petaling Jaya Rangers)
21	DF	MAS	Adam Fahmi (youth system)
24	DF	MAS	Badrul Hisham (youth system)
25	GK	MAS	Uzair Zaidil (youth system)
26	FW	MAS	Georgi Kinkladze Tom (youth system)
28	FW	MAS	Jeffrey Bato (youth system)
29	DF	MAS	Shukor Sulaiman (youth system)
30	GK	MAS	Andy Nicholas (youth system)
32	DF	MAS	Stevenson Unggah (youth system)
34	DF	MAS	Rahman Ismawi (youth system)

Out:

No.	Pos.	Nation	Player
3	DF	MAS	Sabre Abu (released)
5	DF	MNE	Miloš Raičković (to (Montenegro) Podgorica)
9	FW	CRO	Mateo Roskam (to UKM)
12	DF	MAS	Ramesh Lai (to Kuching)
13	DF	MAS	Dzulazlan Ibrahim (to Kuching)
14	DF	KOR	Kim Chi-gon (released)
16	DF	MAS	Mazwandi Zekeria (to Kuching)
17	DF	MAS	Hairol Mokhtar (to Kuching)
21	GK	MAS	Iqbal Suhaimi (to Kuching)
25	GK	MAS	Firdaus Muhamad (released)
27	MF	MAS	Hafis Saperi (to Kuching)

=== Selangor United ===
In:

No.	Pos.	Nation	Player
8	MF	UZB	Nikita Pavlenko (from (Uzbekistan) Mash'al)
9	FW	EGY	Eslam Mohamed Zaki (from (Bangladesh) Sheikh Russel)
10	FW	ARG	Ezequiel Agüero (from Melaka United)
13	MF	MAS	Fauzan Dzulkifli (from Negeri Sembilan)
14	FW	MAS	Abdul Hadi Yahya (from MOF)
16	FW	MAS	Nazrul Kamaruzaman (from Felcra)
17	DF	MAS	Rizal Fahmi (from Negeri Sembilan)
19	MF	MAS	Norhafizzuan Jailani (from Terengganu City)
20	DF	MAS	Syafiq Azri (from UKM)
24	MF	MAS	Raslam Khan (from Petaling Jaya Rangers)
25	MF	MAS	Rafiq Shah (from Petaling Jaya Rangers)
26	DF	MAS	Munawwar Shavukath (from Terengganu City)
29	GK	MAS	Syazwan Yusoff (from Terengganu)
30	DF	CTA	Franklin Anzité (from PKNP)

Out:

No.	Pos.	Nation	Player
2	DF	MAS	Hasmarul Fadzir
3	DF	MAS	Ashriq Yahya
4	DF	MAS	Iqbal Naim
6	MF	MAS	Ashadi Yusoff
8	MF	MAS	Azwan Jatin
9	FW	MAS	Zamri Hassan
16	MF	MAS	Adam Shafiq
25	GK	MAS	Redzuan Harun
26	GK	MAS	Syazwan Abdullah

=== Terengganu II ===
In:

No.	Pos.	Nation	Player
1	GK	MAS	Nik Amin (from Terengganu III)
2	DF	UKR	Serhii Andrieiev (unattached)
4	DF	MAS	Che Arif (from Felcra)
6	MF	MAS	Azizan Ikhwan
10	FW	MAS	Izzan Syahmi (from Terengganu III)
25	MF	CIV	Dechi Marcel (from UiTM)
26	MF	MAS	Isyraf Razali (from Terengganu III)

Out:

No.	Pos.	Nation	Player
2	DF	MAS	Arif Fadzilah (to Felda United)
4	DF	MAS	Fazirhikhwan Mat Rani (released)
8	MF	MAS	Sharin Sapien (to Terengganu)
10	MF	MAS	Fakhrurazi Musa (to Batu Dua)
11	MF	MAS	Ismail Faruqi (released)
13	MF	MAS	Shakir Zufayri (released)
14	DF	MAS	Muhammad Mohd Faudzi (to Terengganu)
16	MF	HAI	Sébastien Thurière (to Penang)
17	DF	HAI	Andrew Jean-Baptiste
19	FW	MAS	Amirul Syahmi (released)
21	MF	MAS	Dhiyaulrahman Hasry (Penang)
33	MF	MAS	Ridzuan Razali (released)

=== UiTM ===
In:

No.	Pos.	Nation	Player
2	DF	MAS	Amirul Ashraf (on loan from Selangor)
4	DF	SSD	Bernard Agele (from (Uganda) Paidha Black Angels)
–	MF	MAS	Asraff Haykal (on loan from Selangor)
5	DF	MAS	Syahmi Shukri
6	MF	MAS	Nazrin Syamsul (from Perlis)
13	DF	MAS	Wan Fatah Wan Ali
16	MF	MAS	Shafiq Al-Hafiz (youth system)
17	FW	SEN	Robert Mendy (from (Philippines) Kaya F.C.–Iloilo)
20	FW	BRU	Adi Said (from (Brunei) DPMM)
25	MF	MAS	Azriddin Rosli (from Petaling Jaya Rangers)
26	FW	MAS	Ridzuan Azman
29	GK	MAS	Haziq Aris (from UKM)
30	FW	MNE	Žarko Korać (from (Thailand) Sisaket)
31	FW	MAS	Nizarruddin Jazi (from Melaka United)
33	FW	MAS	Zulkarnain Rosli

Out:

No.	Pos.	Nation	Player
2	DF	GAM	Mamadou Danso (released)
4	DF	MAS	Shazlan Abu Samah (released)
5	DF	MAS	Al-Imran Halim (released)
9	FW	MAS	Anwarul Hafiz (released)
14	MF	KOR	Noh Sang-min (released)
15	DF	KGZ	Veniamin Shumeyko (to (Vietnam) Becamex Binh Duong)
16	DF	MAS	Faiz Bandong (released)
17	MF	MAS	Asnan Awal (released)
19	FW	MAS	Yusri Abas (to Perlis)
23	GK	MAS	Soffuan Tawil (released)
24	DF	MAS	Arman Fareez (loan return to Penang)
25	GK	MAS	Hafidz Romly (released)
26	MF	MAS	Sadam Hashim (to Felda United)
52	DF	MAS	Che Safwan Hazman (to Penang)
55	FW	NGA	Okereke Timothy (released)

=== UKM ===
In:

No.	Pos.	Nation	Player
1	GK	MAS	Daniel Wafiuddin (from Pahang)
2	DF	MAS	K. Reuben (from PKNS)
7	MF	MAS	Arip Amiruddin (from Felcra)
9	FW	NGA	Michael Ijezie (from MIFA)
10	MF	MAS	Hafizi Amiruddin (from MOF)
15	FW	CRO	Mateo Roskam (from Sarawak)
16	MF	MAS	Zarul Aidiel (from Negeri Sembilan)
17	MF	MAS	Hariz Fazrin (from PDRM)
19	MF	MAS	Irwan Syazmin (from PKNP)
21	MF	MAS	Arif Zahir
22	GK	MAS	Khatul Anuar (on loan from Kuala Lumpur)
24	MF	MAS	Syed Sobri (from Terengganu II)
25	FW	MAS	Tuan Muqris (from Terengganu IV)
26	MF	IRN	Milad Zeneyedpour (from (Indonesia) Madura United)
29	FW	MAS	Asyraaf Mat Pushni (from PKNP)
30	DF	ROU	Alexandru Tudose (from Marcerra Kuantan)
31	GK	MAS	Amin Faisal (from PKNP)

Out:

No.	Pos.	Nation	Player
1	GK	MAS	Zamir Zaini (released)
2	DF	NGA	Waheed Oseni (released)
9	MF	MAS	Ikqmal Rieezal (released)
10	FW	MAS	Hasrul Nurkholis (to Penjara)
11	MF	MAS	Gusti Ishak (released)
13	DF	MAS	Azryl Reza (released)
18	GK	MAS	Gafur Samsudin (released)
19	FW	MAS	Faidzol Fazreen (released)
21	DF	MAS	Raffiq Roslan (released)
23	DF	MAS	Aliff Jamaluddin (released)
25	MF	FRA	Redouane Zerzouri (to (Morocco) Berkane)
26	MF	KOR	Nam Se-in (released)
29	GK	MAS	Khairi Hassan (released)
30	DF	MAS	Adam Othman (to Negeri Sembilan)
–	GK	MAS	Haziq Aris (to UiTM)
–	MF	MAS	Muhamad Azmi (released)
–	DF	MAS	Syafiq Azri (to Selangor United)
–	FW	MAS	Rijal Fiqry (released)

== Malaysia M3 League ==
=== Kelantan United ===
In:

No.	Pos.	Nation	Player
1	GK	MAS	Shahrizan Ismail (from Kelantan)
4	DF	GUI	Seydou Sako
7	MF	MAS	Rozaimi Azwar (from Kelantan)
8	MF	MAS	Shahrul Hakim (from D'AR Wanderers)
9	MF	MAD	Carlos Zozimar (from (Thailand) Pattani)
10	FW	MAS	Fakhrul Zaman (from Kelantan)
11	MF	MAS	Famirul Asraf (from MOF)
15	DF	MAS	Daudsu Jamaludin (from D'AR Wanderers)
18	MF	MAS	Amir Zikri (from Kelantan)
20	MF	MAS	Shamsul Kamal (from Hanelang)
22	MF	MAS	Khairul Ramadhan (from Terengganu City)
26	MF	MAS	Fadhilah Pauzi (from Perlis)
27	DF	MAS	Faizol Nazlin (from Kelantan)

Out:

No.	Pos.	Nation	Player
