= 2019 Malaysia Super League =

Liga Super Malaysia
- Season: 2019
- Dates: 1 February – 21 July 2019
- Champions: Johor Darul Ta'zim; 6th Super League title 6th Liga M title
- Runner up: Kedah Fa
- Relegated: PKNP; PKNS; Kuala Lumpur
- AFC Champions League: Johor Darul Ta'zim; Kedah FA
- Matches: 132
- Goals: 403 (3.05 per match)
- Top goalscorer: Kpah Sherman (14 goals)
- Biggest home win: Melaka United 6–0 Felda United (15 May 2019)
- Biggest away win: Selangor 0–4 PKNS FC (17 February 2019); PKNP 0–4 Perak (27 April 2019); Kuala Lumpur 0–4 Johor Darul Ta'zim (13 July 2019)
- Highest scoring: 9 goals Felda United FC 5–4 PKNS FC (14 June 2019)
- Longest winning run: 4 matches Johor Darul Ta'zim
- Longest unbeaten run: 20 matches Johor Darul Ta'zim
- Longest winless run: 13 matches PKNP
- Longest losing run: 7 matches Kuala Lumpur

The 2019 Malaysia Super League (Malay: Liga Super Malaysia 2019) is the 16th season of the Malaysia Super League, the top-tier professional football league in Malaysia.

Johor Darul Ta'zim are the current defending champions from the 2018 Malaysia Super League seasons and will qualify for the group stage of 2019 AFC Champions League.

The first transfer window is from 29 November 2018 to 20 February 2019.

== Club licensing regulations ==
Since the 2018 Malaysia Super League season, as part of the privatization effort, every team in the Liga Super Malaysia must have an FAM Club Licence to play in the league or be relegated. To obtain an FAM Club Licence, teams must be financially healthy and meet certain standards of conduct as organisations.

As in other national leagues, there are significant benefits to being in the top division:

- A greater share of television broadcast licence revenues goes to Liga Super Malaysia sides.
- Greater exposure through television and higher attendance levels helps Liga Super Malaysia teams attract the most lucrative sponsorship.
- Liga Super Malaysia teams develop substantial financial muscle through the combination of television and gate revenues, sponsorship and marketing of their team brands. This allows them to attract and retain skilled players from domestic and international sources and to construct first-class stadium facilities.

Despite several reminders from FAM from the beginning of 2015, however there are few teams failed to get the approval for both AFC and FAM club licenses from First Instance Body (FIB) .

Team(s)	AFC Club License Status	FAM Club License Status
Johor Darul Ta'zim	Passed	Passed
Perak	Passed	Passed
PKNS	Passed	Passed
Pahang	Banned	Passed
Terengganu	Passed	Passed
Kedah	Passed	Passed
Melaka United	Passed	Passed
Selangor	Passed	Passed
PKNP	Failed	Passed
Kuala Lumpur	Failed	Passed
Felda United	N/A	Passed
Petaling Jaya	N/A	Passed

*Updated: 2 January 2019

== Team changes ==
Kelantan and Negeri Sembilan were relegated to 2019 Malaysia Premier League after finished 11th and bottom place of last season league. FELDA United and MISC-MIFA promoted to 2019 Malaysia Super League after securing place as champions and third-place in 2018 Malaysia Premier League.

=== To Malaysia Super League ===
Promoted from the 2018 Malaysia Premier League

- FELDA United
- MISC-MIFA^{1}

=== From Malaysia Super League ===
Relegated to the 2019 Malaysia Premier League

- Kelantan
- Negeri Sembilan

Renamed/Rebranded Clubs

- MISC-MIFA was rebranded to Petaling Jaya City FC, and located to Petaling Jaya, Selangor.
- Terengganu FA separate and formed Terengganu Football Club.

Notes:

^1 Originally FELCRA were promoted along with FELDA United to the 2019 Malaysia Super League, but after Felcra announced their withdrawal from the Super League participation, MISC-MIFA, the next highest team in the Premier League table, were invited as replacement.

== Clubs locations ==
Locations of teams in the 2019 Malaysia Super League.

=== Venues ===
Team	Location	Stadium	Capacity
FELDA United	Jengka	Tun Abdul Razak Stadium	25,000
Johor Darul Ta'zim	Johor Bahru	Tan Sri Dato' Haji Hassan Yunos Stadium	30,000
Kedah	Alor Setar	Darul Aman Stadium	32,387
Kuala Lumpur	Kuala Lumpur	Kuala Lumpur Stadium	18,000
Melaka United	Central Melaka	Hang Jebat Stadium	40,000
Pahang	Kuantan	Darul Makmur Stadium	40,000
Perak	Ipoh	Perak Stadium	42,500
Petaling Jaya	Petaling Jaya	Petaling Jaya Stadium	25,000
PKNP	Manjung	Manjung Municipal Council Stadium	15,000
PKNS	Shah Alam	Shah Alam Stadium	80,372
Selangor	Shah Alam	Shah Alam Stadium	80,372
Terengganu	Kuala Terengganu	Sultan Ismail Nasiruddin Shah Stadium	15,000

== Personnel, kit and sponsoring ==
Team	Head coach	Captain	Kit manufacturer	Main sponsor
FELDA United	(Malaysia) Nidzam Jamil	(Malaysia) Hadin Azman	FBT	FELDA
Johor Darul Ta'zim	(Argentina) Luciano Figueroa	(Singapore) Hariss Harun	Nike	Forest City
Kedah	(Singapore) Aidil Sharin Sahak	(Malaysia) Baddrol Bakhtiar	Lotto	PKNK
Kuala Lumpur	(Malaysia) Chong Yee Fatt (caretaker)	(Malaysia) Indra Putra Mahayuddin	SkyHawk	DBKL
Melaka United	(Malaysia) Zainal Abidin Hassan	(Malaysia) Shukor Adan	Warrix	EDRA, CGN, KLIP
Pahang	(Malaysia) Dollah Salleh	(Malaysia) Matthew Davies	Umbro	Aras Kuasa
Perak	(Australia) Mehmet Duraković	(Malaysia) Nasir Basharudin	Umbro	Visit Perak
Petaling Jaya	(Malaysia) K. Devan	(Malaysia) S. Subramaniam	Puma	Qnet
PKNP	(Malaysia) Abu Bakar Fadzim	(Malaysia) Hafiz Ramdan	Admiral	PKNP, MAPS Perak
PKNS	(Malaysia) K. Rajagopal	(Malaysia) Akram Mahinan	Lotto	PKNS
Selangor	(Malaysia) B. Sathianathan	(Malaysia) Amri Yahyah	Joma	Selangor
Terengganu	(Malaysia) Nafuzi Zain (caretaker)	(Ivory Coast) Kipré Tchétché	Al-Ikhsan	Terengganu Inc.

Match balls supplied by Nike, this season's version is the Merlin. Referee kits are made by Kronos.

=== Coaching changes ===
Note: Flags indicate national team as has been defined under FIFA eligibility rules. Players may hold more than one non-FIFA nationality.

Team	Outgoing coach	Manner of departure	Date of vacancy	Position in table	Incoming coach	Date of appointment
Kedah	(Malaysia) Azzmi Aziz (caretaker)	End of caretaker spell	September 2018	Pre-season	(Singapore) Aidil Sharin	8 October 2018
FELDA United	(Malaysia) B. Sathianathan	Resigned	11 October 2018	Pre-season	(Malaysia) Nidzam Jamil	12 October 2018
Melaka United	(Malaysia) E. Elavarasan	End of contract	November 2018	Pre-season	(Malaysia) Zainal Abidin Hassan	14 November 2018
Selangor	(Malaysia) Nazliazmi Nasir	Demoted into assistant head coach	23 November 2018	Pre-season	(Malaysia) B. Sathianathan	23 November 2018
Kuala Lumpur	(Malaysia) Chong Yee Fatt (caretaker)	Demoted into assistant head coach	5 December 2018	Pre-season	(Malaysia) Yusri Che Lah	5 December 2018
Kuala Lumpur	(Malaysia) Yusri Che Lah	Resigned	11 March 2019	12th	(Malaysia) Chong Yee Fatt (caretaker)	11 March 2019
Terengganu	(Malaysia) Irfan Bakti	Resigned	15 May 2019	8th	(Malaysia) Nafuzi Zain (caretaker)	15 May 2019

== Foreign players ==
Southeast Asia (SEA) players need to have acquired at least 30 international caps for their senior national team with no period restriction on when caps are earned and those who has less than 30 international caps will be subjected to FMLLP approval.

Note: Flags indicate national team as defined under FIFA eligibility rules. Players may hold more than one FIFA and non-FIFA nationality.

Team	Player 1	Player 2	Player 3	Asian Player	SEA Player	Former Players ^{1}
FELDA United	(Brazil) Thiago Junio	(Brazil) Jocinei	(Japan) Kei Ikeda	(Japan) Masaki Watanabe	**(Singapore) Khairul Amri**	(Bahrain) Jaycee John **(Timor-Leste) Quirino**
Johor Darul Ta'zim	(Brazil) Maurício	**(Argentina) Leandro Velazquez**	(Brazil) Diogo	(Iraq) Gonzalo Cabrera	(Singapore) Hariss Harun	(Spain) Aarón Ñíguez
Kedah	(Brazil) Renan Alves	(Argentina) Jonatan Bauman	(Spain) Fernando Rodríguez	**(Kyrgyzstan) Edgar Bernhardt**	(Singapore) Shakir Hamzah	(Iraq) Anmar Almubaraki
Kuala Lumpur	**(Montenegro) Darko Marković**	(Brazil) Paulo Josué	(Brazil) Guilherme	**(South Korea) Noh Haeng-Seok**	(Philippines) Luke Woodland	(Netherlands) Sylvano Comvalius (Japan) Ryutaro Karube
Melaka United	(Croatia) **Dominik Balić**	(Serbia) **Luka Milunović**	(Ivory Coast) **Davy Claude Angan**	(South Korea) Jang Suk-won	(Philippines) Patrick Reichelt	(Montenegro) Darko Marković (Kosovo) Liridon Krasniqi (Brazil) Casagrande
Pahang	(France) Hérold Goulon	**(Namibia) Lazarus Kaimbi**	(Nigeria) Dickson Nwakaeme	(Singapore) Safuwan Baharudin	(Indonesia) Saddil Ramdani	(Brazil) Zé Love
Perak	(Brazil) Leandro	**(Brazil) Careca**	**(Brazil) Ronaldo**	**(Lebanon) Hussein Eldor**		(Brazil) Wander Luiz (Brazil) Gilmar (Australia) Zac Anderson
Petaling Jaya	(Brazil) Elizeu	**(Brazil) Serginho**	**(Brazil) Brandão**	(South Korea) Bae Beom-geun	**(Timor-Leste) Pedro Henrique**	(Brazil) Giancarlo (Philippines) Joshua Grommen (Brazil) Pedro Henrique
PKNP	**(Brazil) Pedro Victor**	**(Brazil) Ramón da Silva Costa**	**(Brazil) Giancarlo**	**(Palestine) Yashir Pinto**	(Philippines) Amani Aguinaldo	(Senegal) Kalidou Yero (Tajikistan) Siyovush Asrorov (Ghana) Thomas Abbey
PKNS	(Colombia) Romel Morales	(Argentina) Gabriel Guerra	(Liberia) Kpah Sherman	(Kyrgyzstan) Tamirlan Kozubaev	**(Thailand) Kittiphong Pluemjai**	(Cambodia) Chan Vathanaka
Selangor	(Brazil) Endrick	**(Brazil) Sandro**	(Nigeria) **Ifedayo Olusegun**	(Australia) Taylor Regan	(Vietnam) Michal Nguyễn	(Grenada) Antonio German (Spain) Rufino Segovia
Terengganu		(England) Lee Tuck	(Ivory Coast) Kipré Tchétché	(Uzbekistan) Sanjar Shaakhmedov	(Cambodia) Thierry Bin	(Montenegro) Igor Zonjić

- Players name in **bold** indicates the player is registered during the mid-season transfer window.
- **^1** Foreign players who left their clubs or were de-registered from playing squad due to medical issues or other matters.

=== Naturalisation players ===
Club	Player 1	Player 2
Johor Darul Ta'zim	(Canada) (Malaysia) **La'Vere Corbin-Ong**^{3} ^{4}	(Spain) (Malaysia) **Kiko Insa**^{3} ^{4}
Kedah	(Australia) (Malaysia) **David Rowley**^{3}	
Kuala Lumpur	(New Zealand) (Malaysia) **Khair Jones**^{3} ^{4}	
Pahang	(Australia) (Malaysia) **Matthew Davies**^{3} ^{4}	(The Gambia) (Malaysia) **Mohamadou Sumareh**^{4}
Melaka	(Hong Kong) (Malaysia) Wong Tse Yang^{3}	
Perak	(Australia) (Malaysia) **Brendan Gan**^{3} ^{4}	
PKNS	(England) (Malaysia) Nicholas Swirad^{3}	

Notes:

^3 Carrying Malaysian heritage.
^4 Participated in the Malaysia national team squad.

== League table ==
Pos	Team	Pld	W	D	L	GF	GA	GD	Pts	Qualification or relegation
1	Johor Darul Ta'zim (C)	22	16	5	1	49	19	+30	53	Qualification for AFC Champions League group stage
2	Pahang	22	12	7	3	37	21	+16	43	
3	Selangor	22	10	7	5	41	35	+6	37	
4	Kedah (Note: Kedah FA qualified for the AFC Champions League preliminary round 2 as Malaysia FA Cup winners.)	22	9	7	6	37	29	+8	34	Qualification for AFC Champions League preliminary round 2
5	Perak	22	8	9	5	36	31	+5	33	
6	Melaka United	22	9	6	7	34	30	+4	33	
7	Terengganu	22	7	9	6	35	37	−2	30	
8	Petaling Jaya City	22	8	2	12	22	29	−7	26	
9	PKNS (Note: PKNS F.C. relegated after withdrawing license to complete for the 2020 Malaysia Premier League season as they become feeder club to Selangor FA.) (R)	22	5	6	11	37	38	−1	21	Relegation to Malaysia Premier League
10	Felda United	22	4	7	11	27	43	−16	19	
11	PKNP (R)	22	3	7	12	22	40	−18	16	Relegation to Malaysia Premier League
12	Kuala Lumpur (R)	22	4	2	16	24	49	−25	14	Relegation to Malaysia Premier League

Source: MFL
Rules for classification: 1) Points; 2) Goal difference; 3) Number of goals scored.
(C) Champions; (R) Relegated

== Result table ==
Home \ Away	FEL	JDT	KED	KLU	MEL	PAH	PRK	PJC	PKP	PKS	SEL	TFC
FELDA United	—	0–2	5–1	1–1	1–1	1–3	2–3	1–0	1–1	5–4	1–2	1–1
Johor DT	3–1	—	2–0	4–1	2–1	2–0	1–0	0–1	3–0	3–1	3–2	3–3
Kedah	4–0	1–1	—	5–2	2–1	0–0	4–2	3–2	1–1	0–0	1–1	3–0
Kuala Lumpur	0–2	0–4	2–1	—	0–1	1–3	3–3	1–0	4–1	2–1	2–3	1–0
Melaka United	6–0	1–2	1–0	2–0	—	1–1	0–0	2–1	2–1	1–1	3–4	3–3
Pahang	3–1	1–1	1–0	2–0	4–1	—	0–0	1–1	2–0	3–2	1–1	3–0
Perak	1–1	0–3	1–1	2–1	2–3	0–1	—	1–0	3–1	2–2	3–2	3–1
Petaling Jaya	1–0	0–1	0–2	1–0	1–2	2–0	0–1	—	1–0	1–0	1–1	1–2
PKNP	1–1	1–1	0–2	4–0	1–0	0–3	0–4	2–3	—	2–2	1–1	2–2
PKNS	2–0	1–2	2–3	3–2	0–1	1–2	3–3	3–0	1–0	—	2–3	1–2
Selangor	1–1	2–4	3–1	2–1	1–1	5–2	1–1	3–0	2–1	0–4	—	1–0
Terengganu	2–1	2–2	2–2	3–1	3–0	1–1	1–1	3–5	1–2	1–1	1–0	—

Updated to match(es) played on 21 July 2019. Source: FMLLP
Legend: Blue = home team win; Yellow = draw; Red = away team win.
For upcoming matches, an "a" indicates there is an article about the rivalry between the two participants.

== Positions by round ==
The table lists the positions of teams after each week of matches.
In order to preserve chronological evolvements, any postponed matches are not included to the round at which they were originally scheduled, but added to the full round they were played immediately afterwards.

Team ╲ Round	1	2	3	4	5	6	7	8	9	10	11	12	13	14	15	16	17	18	19	20	21	22
Johor Darul Ta'zim	4	2	3	2	1	1	2	1	1	1	1	1	1	1	1	1	1	1	1	1	1	1
Pahang	1	1	2	3	2	2	1	2	2	2	2	2	2	2	2	2	2	2	2	2	2	2
Selangor	7	6	9	9	10	8	7	5	4	3	3	4	3	4	5	3	5	4	3	5	4	3
Kedah	2	4	1	1	3	3	3	3	3	4	4	3	4	3	3	4	3	3	4	4	3	4
Perak	10	8	10	10	9	7	8	8	8	8	8	8	6	6	8	6	6	5	6	6	6	5
Melaka United	3	3	4	5	4	5	5	6	6	5	6	6	5	5	4	5	4	6	5	3	5	6
Terengganu	8	11	7	6	6	6	6	7	9	7	7	7	8	8	6	7	7	7	7	7	7	7
Petaling Jaya	9	7	6	7	8	10	9	9	10	10	10	10	9	7	9	9	8	9	9	9	8	8
PKNS	6	9	5	4	5	4	4	4	5	6	5	5	7	9	7	8	9	8	8	8	9	9
FELDA United	5	5	8	8	7	9	10	11	11	12	11	11	12	12	12	12	12	12	12	11	11	10
PKNP	12	10	11	11	11	11	11	10	7	9	9	9	10	10	11	11	11	11	10	10	10	11
Kuala Lumpur	11	12	12	12	12	12	12	12	12	11	12	12	11	11	10	10	10	10	11	12	12	12

Leader
Relegation to 2020 Premier League

Updated to match(es) played on 21 July 2019. Source:

== Season statistics ==
=== Top scorers ===
As of matches played on 21 July 2019.

Players sorted first by goals, then by last name.

Rank	Player	Club	Goals
1	(Liberia) Kpah Sherman	PKNS	14
2	(Brazil) Diogo	Johor Darul Ta'zim	12
2	(Nigeria) Ifedayo Olusegun	Selangor	12
4	(Iraq) Gonzalo Cabrera	Johor Darul Ta'zim	11
5	(Philippines) Patrick Reichelt	Melaka United	10
6	(Brazil) Giancarlo	Petaling Jaya/PKNP	9
6	(Spain) Fernando Rodriguez	Kedah	9
8	(Brazil) Guilherme de Paula	Kuala Lumpur	8
8	(Argentina) Leandro Velázquez	Johor Darul Ta'zim	8
8	(Malaysia) Safawi Rasid	Johor Darul Ta'zim	8
8	(Uzbekistan) Sanjar Shaakhmedov	Terengganu	8

=== Top assists ===
As of matches played 21 July 2019.

Rank	Player	Club	Assists
1	(England) Lee Tuck	Terengganu	7
2	(Kyrgyzstan) Edgar Bernhardt	Kedah	6
2	(Colombia) Romel Morales	PKNS	6
2	(Brazil) Sandro	Selangor	6
5	(Malaysia) Baddrol Bakhtiar	Kedah	5
5	(Malaysia) Safawi Rasid	Johor Darul Ta'zim	5
5	(Brazil) Diogo	Johor Darul Ta'zim	5

=== Clean sheets ===
As of matches played on 21 July 2019.

Players sorted first by clean sheets, then by last name.

Rank	Player	Club	Clean sheets
1	(Malaysia) Ifwat Akmal	Kedah	6
1	(Malaysia) Helmi Eliza	Pahang	6
1	(Malaysia) Khairul Fahmi	Melaka United	6
1	(Malaysia) Farizal Marlias	Johor Darul Ta'zim	6
5	(Malaysia) Zarif Irfan	PKNS	5
6	(Malaysia) Hafizul Hakim	Perak	4
6	(Malaysia) Muhaimin Mohamad	PJ City	4

== See also ==
- 2019 Malaysia Premier League
- 2019 Malaysia M3 League
- 2019 Malaysia M4 League
- 2019 Malaysia FA Cup
- 2019 Malaysia Cup
- 2019 Malaysia Challenge Cup
- 2019 Piala Presiden
- 2019 Piala Belia
- List of Malaysian football first transfers 2019
