= Afandi =

Afandi is a name. Notable people with the surname include:

- Al-Fateh Afandi (born 1997), Malaysian footballer
- Husenil Muhammad Afandi, Russian Muslim scholar
- Mustapha Afandi (born 1958), Moroccan former cyclist
- Rachmat Afandi (born 1984), Indonesian footballer
- Nour El-Afandi (born 1993), Egyptian synchronized swimmer
- Ahmad Afandi Abdulaev (born 1959), Russian religious leader
- Hamdulla Afandi Afandizadeh, Azerbaijani military and public figure
- Said Afandi al-Chirkawi (1937–2012), Russian scholar
- Mirza Huseyn Afandi Qayibov, Azerbaijani clergyman
