= Ezanie Salleh =

Malaysian association football player

Personal information
- Full name: Mohamad Ezanie bin Mat Salleh
- Date of birth: 18 April 1995 (age 31)
- Place of birth: Perak, Malaysia
- Height: 1.74 m (5 ft 9 in)
- Position: Right-back

Team information
- Current team: Sri Pahang
- Number: 2

Senior career*
Years	Team	Apps	(Gls)
2017–2019	PKNP	44	(0)
2020	Felda United	4	(0)
2021–	Sri Pahang	10	(0)
- * Club domestic league appearances and goals as of 1 September 2021

Mohamad Ezanie bin Mat Salleh (born 18 April 1995) is a Malaysian professional footballer who plays as a right-back for Sri Pahang.

== Career statistics ==
=== Club ===
As of match played 1 September 2021

Appearances and goals by club, season and competition
Club	Season	League			Cup		League Cup		Continental		Total	
Club	Season	Division	Apps	Goals	Apps	Goals	Apps	Goals	Apps	Goals	Apps	Goals
PKNP	2017	Malaysia Premier League	17	0	4	0	5	0	–		26	0
PKNP	2018	Malaysia Super League	13	0	6	0	0	0	–		19	0
PKNP	2019	Malaysia Super League	14	0	2	0	1	0	–		17	0
PKNP	Total		44	0	12	0	6	0	–		62	0
Felda United	2020	Malaysia Super League	4	0	0	0	0	0	–		4	0
Felda United	Total		4	0	0	0	0	0	–		4	0
Sri Pahang	2021	Malaysia Super League	10	0	0	0	0	0	–		10	0
Sri Pahang	Total		10	0	0	0	0	0	–		10	0
Career Total			0	0	0	0	0	0	–	–	0	0
