= Islam.ru =

Russian-language website

islam.ru
- Website type: Web portal
- Available in: 2 languages
- List of languages Russian, English
- Country of origin: Russia
- Website: www.islam.ru
- Commercial: No
- Registration: Not required
- Launched: 2001
- Current status: Online

Islam.Ru is a Russian-language web portal dedicated to highlighting the provisions of Islam and its social and cultural role. Islam.ru is one of the largest Islamic sites in Runet. From 2000 to 2011, the website had about 15 thematic sections, including news, analytical, religious, environment, women and family, culture and Sufism.

The website publishes news, articles, religious texts (in particular, the texts of prayers), there is a heading "Online Consultation", through which psychological, legal and theological consultation is provided. The website materials are used and cited by the Russian media. The web portal has its own accounts in all popular social networks through which feedback from readers is received.

== History ==
The website was established in 2001 by Spiritual Administration of Muslims of Dagestan with the participation of a number of Foundations. According to the "Caucasian Knot", it was financed by Dagestani businessman Abusupyan Kharkharov. The first chief editor of the site was Marat Sayfutdinov.

The site currently has 13 sections. There is also a full-fledged English version of the site, which was developed and launched under the leadership of the then editor-in-chief Aina Patimat Gamzatova.

From 2001 to 2011 the deputy chief editor and head of the information and analytical department of the publication was Mukhametov, Rinat Midikhatovich.

In February 2011, the website was redesigned. Murad Osmanov, an employee of the Spiritual Administration of the Muslims of Dagestan (DUMD), became the director of the website and the website headquarters moved to Dagestan. Murad Osmanov died together with Sheikh Said afandi of Chirkey August 28, 2012. Since 2011 the chief editor was Gamzatova, Aina Zairbekovna. On March 5, 2018, Magomedov Magomed Yusupovich was appointed editor-in-chief.
