= Ibni Khozaimi =

Malaysian footballer

Personal information
- Full name: Muhammad Ibni bin Khozaimi
- Date of birth: 19 September 1994 (age 32)
- Place of birth: Malaysia
- Height: 1.63 m (5 ft 4 in)
- Position: Midfielder

Team information
- Current team: PKNP
- Number: 28

Senior career*
| Years | Team | Apps | (Gls) |
| 2016– | PKNP | 5 | (0) |
- * Club domestic league appearances and goals as of 2 March 2019

Muhammad Ibni bin Khozaimi (born 19 September 1994) is a Malaysian footballer who plays as a midfielder for PKNP.
