= Chirkey =

Rural locality in the Republic of Dagestan, Russia

Chirkey Чиркей
- Selo

Other transcription(s)
  - Avar: Чӏикӏаб
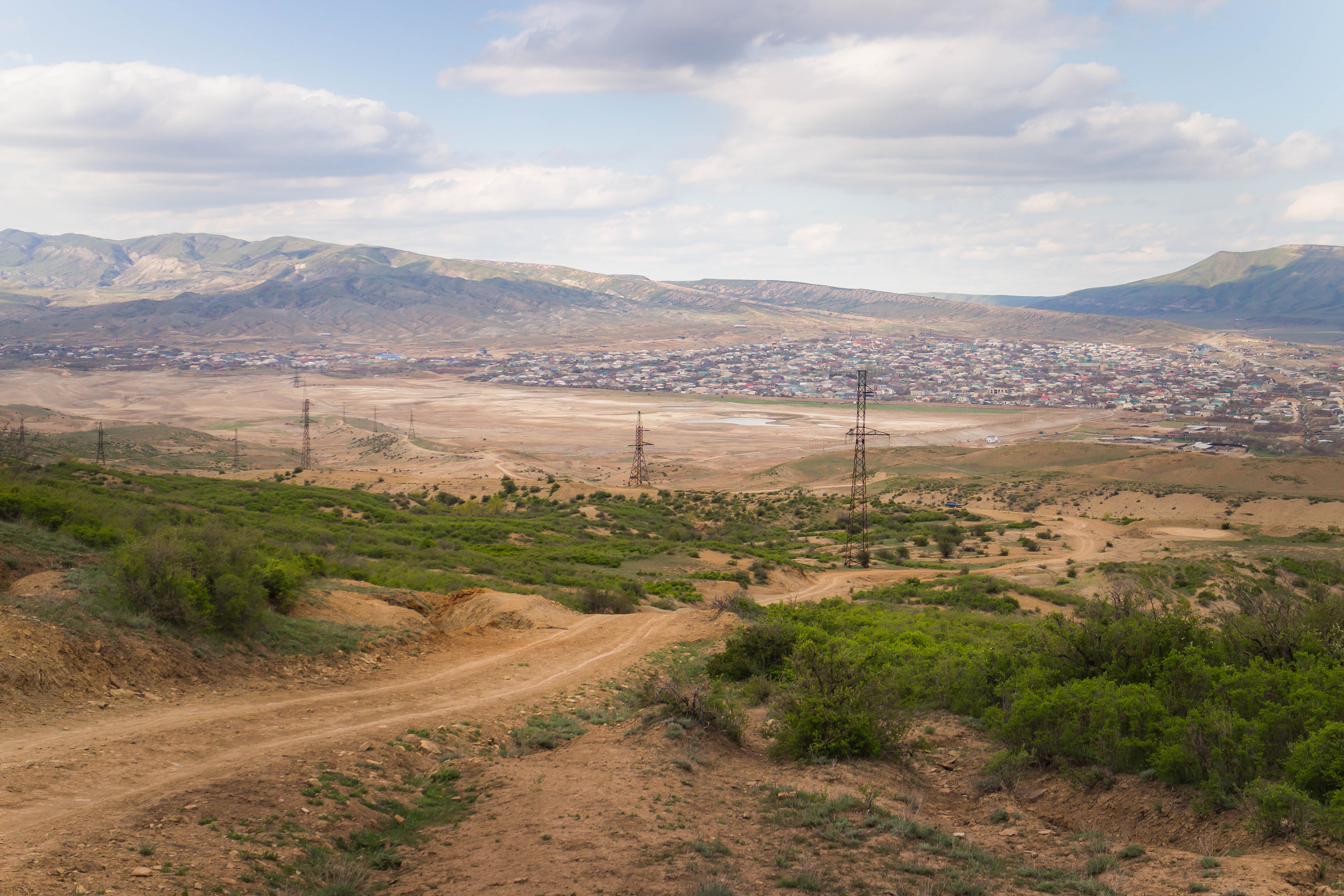
- Interactive map of Chirkey
- Location of Chirkey Chirkey (Republic of Dagestan)
- Coordinates: 42°57′40″N 46°58′42″E
- Country: Russia
- Federal subject: Dagestan
- Founded: 1967
- Elevation: 409 m (1,342 ft)

Population
  - Estimate (2025): 10,477 )
- Time zone: UTC+3 (MSK)
- Postal code: 368219
- OKTMO ID: 82611484101

Chirkey (Russian: Чиркей; Avar: Чӏикӏаб) is a rural locality (a selo) in Buynaksky District of the Republic of Dagestan, Russia. Population: 8,676 (2010 census); 7,434 (2002 census). See also Chirkey Dam.
