= Bryan See Tian Keat =

Malaysian footballer (born 1993)

Bryan See
Personal information
- Full name: Bryan See Tian Keat
- Date of birth: 22 June 1993 (age 33)
- Place of birth: Subang Jaya, Malaysia
- Height: 1.80 m (5 ft 11 in)
- Position: Goalkeeper

Team information
- Current team: PDRM
- Number: 1

Youth career
- Subang Jaya Community Sports Club
- Arsenal Soccer School Malaysia
- Brazilian Football Club
- 2011–2012: PKNS
- 2013: Perak

College career
Years	Team	Apps	(Gls)
2013–2014	UC Irvine Anteaters		
2015–2017	Johns Hopkins Blue Jays		

Senior career*
Years	Team	Apps	(Gls)
2018	PKNP	4	(0)
2019	Bangkok	11	(0)
2019–2020	PDRM	9	(0)
2021–2022	Penang	11	(0)
2022	Melaka United	14	(0)
2023	Perak	9	(0)
2024–	PDRM	0	(0)
- * Club domestic league appearances and goals as of 28 December 2022

Bryan See Tian Keat
- Traditional Chinese: 施恬傑
- Simplified Chinese: 施恬杰
Transcriptions
Standard Mandarin
- Hanyu Pinyin: Shī Tiánjié
Southern Min
- Hokkien POJ: Si Tiâm-kia̍t

Bryan See Tian Keat (born 22 June 1993) is a Malaysian footballer who plays as a goalkeeper for Malaysia Super League club PDRM.

== Early life ==
See was born in Subang Jaya, Selangor, to Eau Teong See and Pih Ngit Ding. He began his youth career with the Subang Jaya Community Sports Club (SJCSC) before moving on to the Arsenal Soccer School and Brazilian Football Club.

== Career ==
=== Youth career ===
See played for PKNS U21 for two seasons, before playing for Perak FA for two years, leading the team to the Sultan Gold Cup championship and a runner-up finish in the Malaysia U21 league. He then furthered his studies in the United States, playing for the collegiate teams of University of California, Irvine and Johns Hopkins University. He graduated with a degree in civil engineering from the latter in 2017.

=== PKNP ===
See then returned to Malaysia and signed with PKNP, whose head coach, Abu Bakar Fadzim, were his former youth coach at Perak. He made his professional debut for PKNP in a Super League match against Kedah on 11 February 2018.

=== Bangkok ===
On 28 December, See confirmed he was moving to Thailand's Thai League 3 to join Bangkok FC.

=== Return to Malaysia ===
After only 6 months with Bangkok, Bryan returned to Malaysia and signed with PDRM F.C. He then joined Penang F.C. at the start of the 2021 season, and Melaka United F.C. in the next season.

He returned to Perak F.C. in the 2023 season and were initially installed as the starting goalkeeper for the team under then new coach Lim Teong Kim. However, after Teong Kim's sacking in the middle of the season, he lost his starting place under the replacement head coach Yusri Che Lah.

Bryan re-signed for his former team PDRM for the 2024–25 season.

== Career statistics ==
=== Club ===
As of 27 May 2019

Club	Season	League		Cup		League Cup		Continental		Total	
Club	Season	Apps	Goals	Apps	Goals	Apps	Goals	Apps	Goals	Apps	Goals
PKNP	2018	3	0	1	0	0	0	–		4	0
PKNP	Total	3	0	1	0	0	0	–		4	0
Bangkok	2019	11	0	0	0	0	0	–		11	0
Bangkok	Total	11	0	0	0	0	0	–		11	0
PDRM	2019	0	0	3	0	0	0	–		3	0
PDRM	2020	6	0	–						6	0
PDRM	Total	6	0	3	0	0	0	–		9	0
Penang	2021	7	0	–		4	0	–		11	0
Penang	Total	7	0	–		4	0	–		11	0
Career total		27	0	4	0	4	0	0	0	35	0
