= Husenil Muhammad Afandi =

Husenill Muhammad Afandi
- Born: Хусенил Мухаммад Афанди; 1862; Urib, Dagestan
- Died: 1967 (aged 104–105); Urib, Dagestan
- Citizenship: Soviet Union, Dagestan
- Occupation: Murshid
- Known for: Shaykh of Naqshbandi & Shazali tariqah
- Website: http://www.islamdag.info

Husenil Muhammad Afandi was a Russian Muslim scholar, spiritual leader, Shaykh of Naqshbandi and Shazali tariqahs in Dagestan.

He was born in 1862 in village Urib and died in 1967 and buried in Urib, Shamilsky District, Dagestan, Soviet Union.

For twenty years he worked as imam in village Kazanishe of Buynaksky District, Dagestan. In 1920 he received ijazah from Shaykh Hasan Hilmi Afandi but he hid it until 1950 when he received second ijazah and order for preceptorship from Shaykh Humayd Afandi. His disciples who received his ijazah include Shaykh Muhammad Arif Afandi, Shaykh Hamzat Afandi and Shaykh Abdul Hamid Afandi, who later passed the tariqah ijazah to Shaykh Said Afandi al-Chirkawi.

In May 2011 new jum`ah mosque named after Shaykh Husenil Muhammad Afandi was opened to public in Makhachkala, Dagestani capital.

In July 2011 gathering of Dagestani Islamic scholars it was decided to open a madrassah named after Shaykh Husenil Muhammad Afandi in village Gogotl where the scholar lived for fifteen years after World War II.
