= Faizzzwan Dorahim =

Malaysian association football player

Personal information
- Full name: Muhammad Faizzzwan bin Dorahim
- Date of birth: 27 October 1995 (age 31)
- Place of birth: Perak, Malaysia
- Height: 1.72 m (5 ft 8 in)
- Position: Defender

Team information
- Current team: PKNP
- Number: 14

Youth career
- Perak

Senior career*
| Years | Team | Apps | (Gls) |
| 2016–2017 | Perak | 0 | (0) |
| 2018– | PKNP | 17 | (0) |
- * Club domestic league appearances and goals as of 21 July 2019

Muhammad Faizzzwan bin Dorahim (born 10 October 1995) is a Malaysian footballer who plays as a defender for Malaysian Super League club PKNP.
