= Khairul Thaqif =

Malaysian footballer (born 1996)

Personal information
- Full name: Khairul Thaqif Shah bin Kamal Bashah
- Date of birth: 8 February 1996 (age 30)
- Place of birth: Perak, Malaysia
- Height: 1.82 m (6 ft 0 in)
- Position: Goalkeeper

Youth career
- Bukit Jalil Sports School
- UiTM

Senior career*
Years	Team	Apps	(Gls)
2017–2018	Shah Alam Antlers	0	(0)
2019	PKNP	8	(0)
- * Club domestic league appearances and goals as of 2 March 2019

Khairul Thaqif Shah bin Kamal Bashah (born 8 February 1996) is a Malaysian footballer who plays as a goalkeeper.
