= Kim Sang-woo (footballer, born 1994) =

South Korean footballer

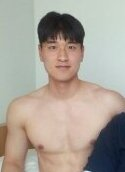
- With Mazran Ramli

Personal information
- Full name: Kim Sang-woo
- Date of birth: 11 June 1994 (age 32)
- Place of birth: Changwon, South Korea
- Height: 1.86 m (6 ft 1 in)
- Position: Centre back

Senior career*
Years	Team	Apps	(Gls)
2017–2018	Gyeongnam	0	(0)
2018	PKNP	12	(4)
2019	Chungbuk Cheongju	0	(0)
2022	Changwon City	15	(1)
2023–2024	Resources Capital	12	(0)
- * Club domestic league appearances and goals as of 26 May 2024

Kim Sang-woo (Korean: 김상우, born 11 June 1994) is a South Korean professional footballer who currently plays as a centre back.

== Club career ==
On 25 June 2023, Kim joined Hong Kong Premier League club Resources Capital.

== Career statistics ==
=== Club ===
As of 15 April 2019.

Club	Season	League			Cup		Other		Total	
Club	Season	Division	Apps	Goals	Apps	Goals	Apps	Goals	Apps	Goals
PKNP	2018	Malaysia Super League	12	4	2 (Note: Appearances in the Malaysia FA Cup)	0	0	0	14	4
Career total			12	4	2	0	0	0	14	4
