= Urib =

Coordinates: 42°27′16″N 46°40′21″E

Urib (Russian: Уриб; Avar: ГӀуриб) is a rural locality (a selo) in Shamilsky District of the Republic of Dagestan, Russia. Dialing code: +7 87259.

Urib is famous for Islamic scholars, among whom the most notable is Shaykh Husenil Muhammad Afandi.
