= Wong Tse Yang =

Malaysian footballer

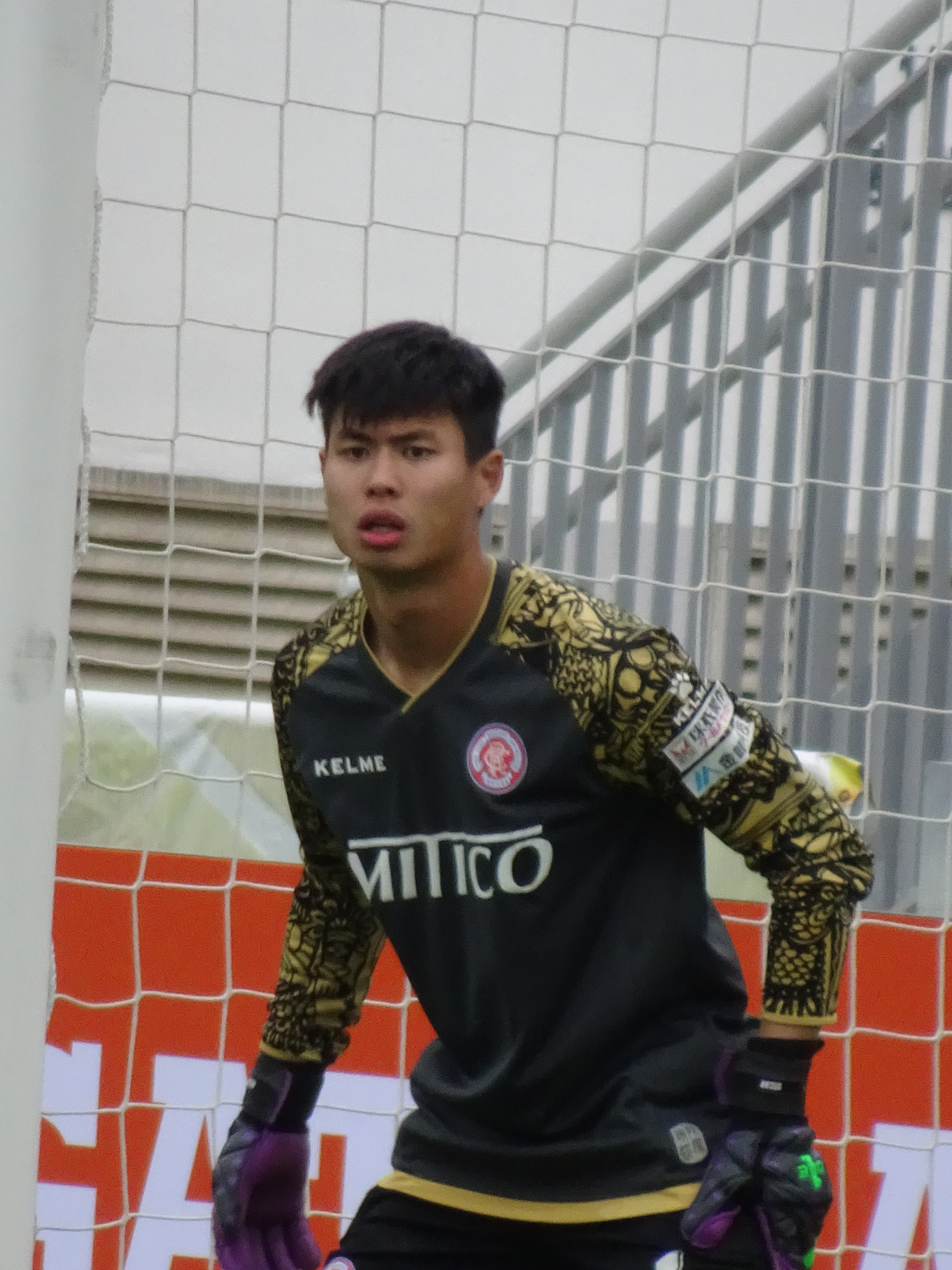

Personal information
- Full name: Oscar Wong Tse Yang
- Date of birth: 13 May 1995 (age 31)
- Place of birth: Hong Kong
- Height: 1.88 m (6 ft 2 in)
- Position: Goalkeeper

Senior career*
Years	Team	Apps	(Gls)
2016–2017	Biu Chun Glory Sky	5	(0)
2017–2018	Rangers (HKG)	12	(0)
2019	Melaka United	0	(0)
2020–2021	Selangor II		
2022	Harini		
- * Club domestic league appearances and goals

Oscar Wong Tse Yang (Chinese: 黄子揚; born 13 May 1995) is a former professional footballer who played as a goalkeeper.

== Club career ==
Wong started his career with Hong Kong Premier League club Biu Chun Glory Sky, where he made five league appearances.

Before the 2019 season, Wong signed for Melaka United in the Malaysian top flight.

Wong joined Malaysia M3 League team Harini for the 2022 season.

== Personal life ==
Wong is the son of former Malaysia international Wong Kam Fook.
