= Al-Fateh Afandi =

Malaysian association football player

Personal information
- Full name: Mohamad Al-Fateh bin Mohd Afandi
- Date of birth: 13 March 1997 (age 29)
- Place of birth: Malaysia
- Position: Midfielder

Team information
- Current team: Manjung City
- Number: 6

Youth career
- 2018: PKNP

Senior career*
Years	Team	Apps	(Gls)
2019	PKNP	15	(0)
2020–	Manjung City		
- * Club domestic league appearances and goals

Mohamad Al-Fateh bin Mohd Afandi is a Malaysian professional footballer who plays as a midfielder for Malaysia A1 Semi-Pro League club Manjung City.
