= Pedro Victor =

Brazilian footballer

Personal information
- Full name: Pedro Victor Calil Sandoval
- Date of birth: 21 March 1993 (age 33)
- Place of birth: Brazil
- Height: 1.88 m (6 ft 2 in)
- Position: Centre-back

Senior career*
Years	Team	Apps	(Gls)
2015	Linense	0	(0)
2016	Glória	5	(0)
2017	Penapolense	9	(2)
2018	Resende	7	(0)
2019	Noroeste	8	(0)
2019	PKNP	10	(0)
2020	Nõmme Kalju	23	(4)
- * Club domestic league appearances and goals as of 14 March 2021

Pedro Victor Calil Sandoval (born 21 March 1993), known simply as Pedro Victor, is a Brazilian footballer who plays as a centre-back.

== Honours ==
Individual

- Meistriliiga Player of the Month: May 2020
