= Said Afandi al-Chirkawi =

Dagestani Islamic scholar (1937–2012)

- Born: Саид Абдурахманович Ацаев; 21 October 1937; Chirkey, Dagestan, Soviet Union
- Died: 28 August 2012 (aged 74); Chirkey, Dagestan, Russia
- Citizenship: Russia
- Occupation: Murshid
- Known for: Shaykh of Naqshbandi and Shazali tariqah
- Website: http://www.saidafandi.ru

Said Afandi al-Chirkawi (Avar: ЧӀикӀаса СагӀид афанди, Russian: Шейх Саид Афанди Чиркейский, Arabic: سعيد أفندي شيركاوي; 21 October 1937 – 28 August 2012) was a prominent scholar in Shafii mazhab and a spiritual master, or murshid. He was killed by a suicide bomber in August 2012.

== Biography ==
Al-Chirkawi was born in 1937 in the village of Chirkey, Buynaksky District, Dagestan Autonomous Soviet Socialist Republic, Soviet Union. He was an Islamic scholar, a spiritual leader of Dagestani Muslims, and Sufi Shaykh of Naqshbandi and Shazali tariqahs. Tens of thousands of Muslims gather annually at Chirkey for brotherhood majlis — Mawlid celebrations — which were organised by Afandi. On 28 April 2012 more than 300,000 people from all over Russia and abroad were present at the annual gathering. Said Afandi was considered one of the Russia's top spiritual leaders whose tens of thousands of followers include influential officials, clerics and businessmen. His father died when Afandi was just seven years old. After high school he worked as shepherd to financially support his family. He served in the Soviet Army and worked as a firefighter at Chirkey Dam before beginning his religious education at the age of 32.

He was killed by a female suicide bomber on 28 August 2012.

== Publications ==
Books and articles of Said Afandi are translated into Russian, Tatar and English languages.

=== Books in Russian language ===
- Сокровищница благодатных знаний (Махачкала, 2010);
- История пророков, том 1 (Махачкала, 2009);
- Сборник выступлений шейха Саида Афанди аль-Чиркави (Махачкала, 2009)
- Современность глазами шейха Саида-Афанди (Махачкала, 2010);
- История пророков, том 2 (Махачкала, 2011);
- Побуждение внять призыву Корана, в 4 томах (Махачкала, 2007)

=== Books in Tatar language ===
- Сокровищница благодатных знаний, перевод М. Ахматжанова (Казань, 2006)

=== Books in Avar language ===
- Назмаби
- Къураналъул ахӀуде гӀавамал кантӀизари
- Къисасул анбияъ
- МажмугӀатуль фаваид
