= Mugenthirran Ganesan =

Malaysian footballer

G. Mugenthirran
Personal information
- Full name: Mugenthirran a/l Ganesan
- Date of birth: 4 April 1993 (age 33)
- Place of birth: Perak, Malaysia
- Height: 1.81 m (5 ft 11 1/2 in)
- Position: Forward

Team information
- Current team: PKNP
- Number: 9

Youth career
- 2014: Perak

Senior career*
Years	Team	Apps	(Gls)
2014–2015	Perak	0	(0)
2015	→ Sungai Ara (loan)	0	(0)
2016–2017	PKNP	0	(0)
2018	MIFA	11	(1)
2019–	PKNP	1	(0)
- * Club domestic league appearances and goals as of 16 February 2019

Mugenthirran a/l Ganesan (born 4 April 1993) is a Malaysian footballer who plays for PKNP as a forward.
