= Amani Aguinaldo =

Filipino footballer (born 1995)

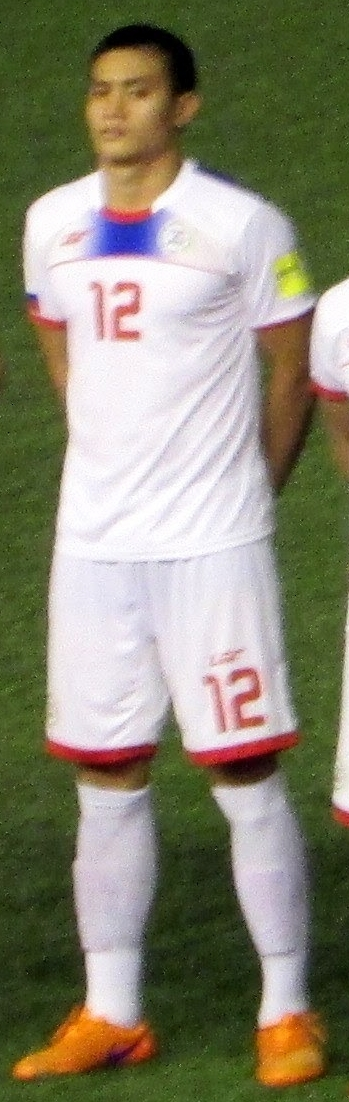
- Aguinaldo with the Philippines in 2015

Personal information
- Full name: Amani Manuel Santos Aguinaldo
- Date of birth: April 24, 1995 (age 31)
- Place of birth: Las Piñas, Philippines
- Height: 1.83 m (6 ft 0 in)
- Position: Center-back

Team information
- Current team: DPMM
- Number: 5

Youth career
- 2012–2013: Loyola

College career
Years	Team	Apps	(Gls)
- Far Eastern University

Senior career*
Years	Team	Apps	(Gls)
2012–2013	Loyola	0	(0)
2013–2017	Global	42	(3)
2018–2019	Ceres-Negros	19	(1)
2019	→ PKNP (loan)	16	(1)
2020–2021	Trat	17	(0)
2021–2022	Nongbua Pitchaya	19	(0)
2022–2023	Nakhon Ratchasima	26	(2)
2023–2024	Trat	14	(1)
2024–2025	Rayong	26	(4)
2025–	DPMM	26	(0)

International career^{‡}
2013	Philippines U19	6	(0)
2012–2014	Philippines U21		(0)
2012	Philippines U22	2	(0)
2013	Philippines U23	2	(0)
2019	Philippines Olympic	4	(3)
2013–	Philippines	72	(0)
- * Club domestic league appearances and goals as of 18 October 2026 ‡ National team caps and goals as of 18 November 2025

Amani Manuel Santos Aguinaldo (born April 24, 1995) is a Filipino professional footballer who plays as a center-back for Malaysia Super League club DPMM and the Philippines national team.

== Education ==
Aguinaldo attended Ateneo de Davao Grade School until grade 6 and transferred to the High School Department Far Eastern University's FERN College in Quezon City where he attended high school. Aguinaldo is taking Sports Science at the University of the Philippines Diliman. As of December 2014, he is on his second year.

== Club career ==
After Aguinaldo was scouted by Coach Kim Chul-soo and program director Vince Santos both from Far Eastern University, which prompted him to transfer to Far Eastern University – FERN College where he attended high school. He played a year with the Far Eastern University at the college level before moving to the University of the Philippines.

He was later signed with the Loyola Meralco Sparks where he debuted as a substitute player at Loyala's stint at the 2012 Singapore Cup. He later transferred to Global. in 2013. In 2018, he moved to another Filipino club Ceres-Negros. Ceres-Negros placed him on loan to Malaysian club PKNP where he played in the 2019 Malaysia Super League. In January 2020, he was signed for Thai club Trat ahead of the 2020 Thai League 1 season.

After Trat FC's relegation to 2021–22 Thai League 2, he was acquired by Nongbua Pitchaya as their ASEAN quota for 2021–22 Thai League 1. In August 2022, he was signed by Thai Club Nakhon Ratchasima ahead of the 2022–23 Thai League 1. He would later return at Trat at the start of the 2023–24 Thai League 1.

After becoming a regular fixture at the heart of the defence for Rayong in the 2024–25 Thai League 1, Aguinaldo returned to Malaysian football with Brunei DPMM who announced his capture for their own return to Malaysia in the 2025–26 season on 7 June 2025. He extended his tenure with DPMM after the season's end.

== International career ==
=== Philippines U-22 Olympic ===
Aguinaldo was part of the Philippines U-22 Olympic squad that competed in the 2019 Southeast Asian Games held in Philippines. He was one of two senior players of the squad along with Stephan Schröck.

=== Philippines ===
In August 2013, he was named in the 21-man squad for the international friendly match against Indonesia on August 14, 2013. He earned his first senior international cap on the said match by replacing James Younghusband in 63rd minute.

He made his first appearance for the under-23 national team in the 1–0 friendly match loss against Singapore on June 13, 2013.

Aguinaldo was a member of the Philippines' squad at both the 2014 AFC Challenge Cup and the 2014 AFF Championship, reaching the finals and semi-finals respectively in each competition. During the latter tournament Aguinaldo was involved in a fair bit of controversy in the first leg of the semi-final as Thai striker Adisak Kraisorn was sent off for an off the ball altercation with the Filipino defender. It appeared that Aguinaldo might have provoked the confrontation and afterwards he and other Filipino footballers received threats from Thai fans.

== Personal life ==
Aguinaldo is an only child of Ariel and Maida Aguinaldo who both had roots to Davao. His name Amani is derived from an African title meaning both "warrior" and "peace". He was born in Las Piñas, but due to his parents' professions his family moved to Cebu and then Davao City where Aguinaldo spent most of his childhood, before moving back to the Manila area where he attended high school. Aguinaldo took up football from his father at the age of five, and nine years later he was called up to the Philippines U-14 by future Loyola coach Kim Chul-soo. At the age of 16 Aguinaldo was selected to play for the U-21 side at the 2012 Hassanal Bolkiah Trophy. During the tournament Aguinaldo was roomed with twins Marwin and Marvin and became good friends with both. His favorite teams are Manchester City, Bayern Munich, AC Milan, and Real Madrid, although his favorite footballer is Lionel Messi.

== International goals ==
=== U23 ===
No.	Date	Venue	Opponent	Score	Result	Competition
1.	4 December 2019	Biñan Football Stadium, Biñan, Philippines	Timor-Leste	2–0	6–1	2019 Southeast Asian Games
2.	4 December 2019	Biñan Football Stadium, Biñan, Philippines	Timor-Leste	5–0	6–1	2019 Southeast Asian Games
3.	4 December 2019	Biñan Football Stadium, Biñan, Philippines	Timor-Leste	6–0	6–1	2019 Southeast Asian Games

== Honours ==
ASEAN All-Stars

- Maybank Challenge Cup: 2025
