= Giancarlo (footballer, born 1990) =

Brazilian footballer

Personal information
- Full name: Giancarlo Lopes Rodrigues
- Date of birth: 14 January 1990 (age 36)
- Place of birth: Iguatemi, Brazil
- Height: 1.95 m (6 ft 5 in)
- Position: Forward

Team information
- Current team: Sheikh Russel KC

Senior career*
Years	Team	Apps	(Gls)
2011	Ferroviária	2	(0)
2012	Taubaté	1	(0)
2013	Ferroviária	26	(19)
2013	Vitória	5	(0)
2013–2014	Treze	13	(3)
2014	São Caetano	5	(0)
2015	Macaé	13	(4)
2015	Rio Branco	3	(1)
2016	Glória	4	(1)
2016	Sousa	0	(1)
2017	Villa Nova	5	(0)
2017	Ariquemes	4	(0)
2018	America	7	(1)
2018	Concórdia	4	(0)
2019	Petaling Jaya City	3	(1)
2019	→ PKNP (loan)	18	(8)
2020	PSM Makassar	3	(1)
2020–	Sheikh Russel KC	3	(0)
- * Club domestic league appearances and goals as of 6 March 2020

Giancarlo Lopes Rodrigues (born 14 January 1990), known simply as Giancarlo, is a Brazilian footballer who plays as a forward for Bangladesh Premier League club Sheikh Russel KC.

== Honours ==
=== Club ===
Vitória

- Campeonato Baiano: 2013
