= Chirkey Dam =

Dam in Dagestan, Russia

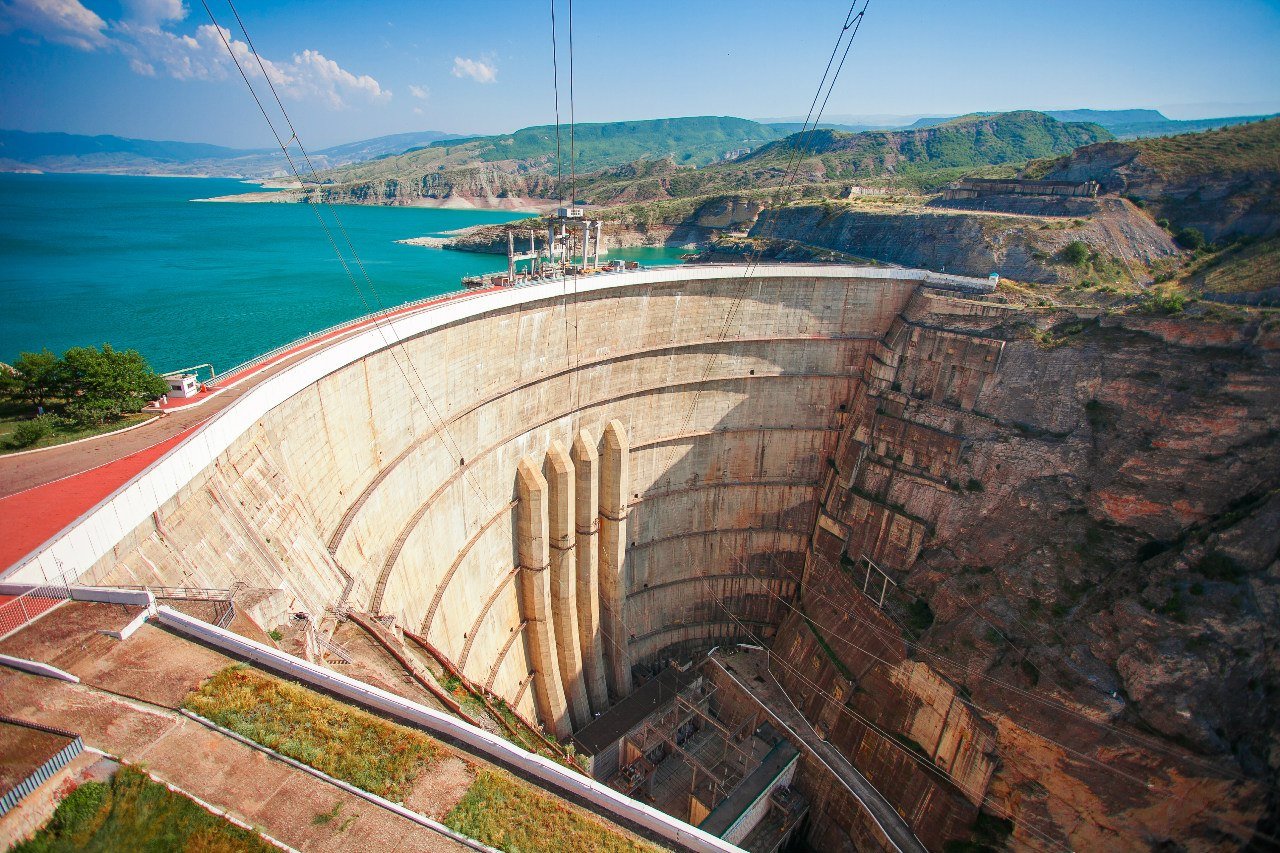
- Chirkey Dam

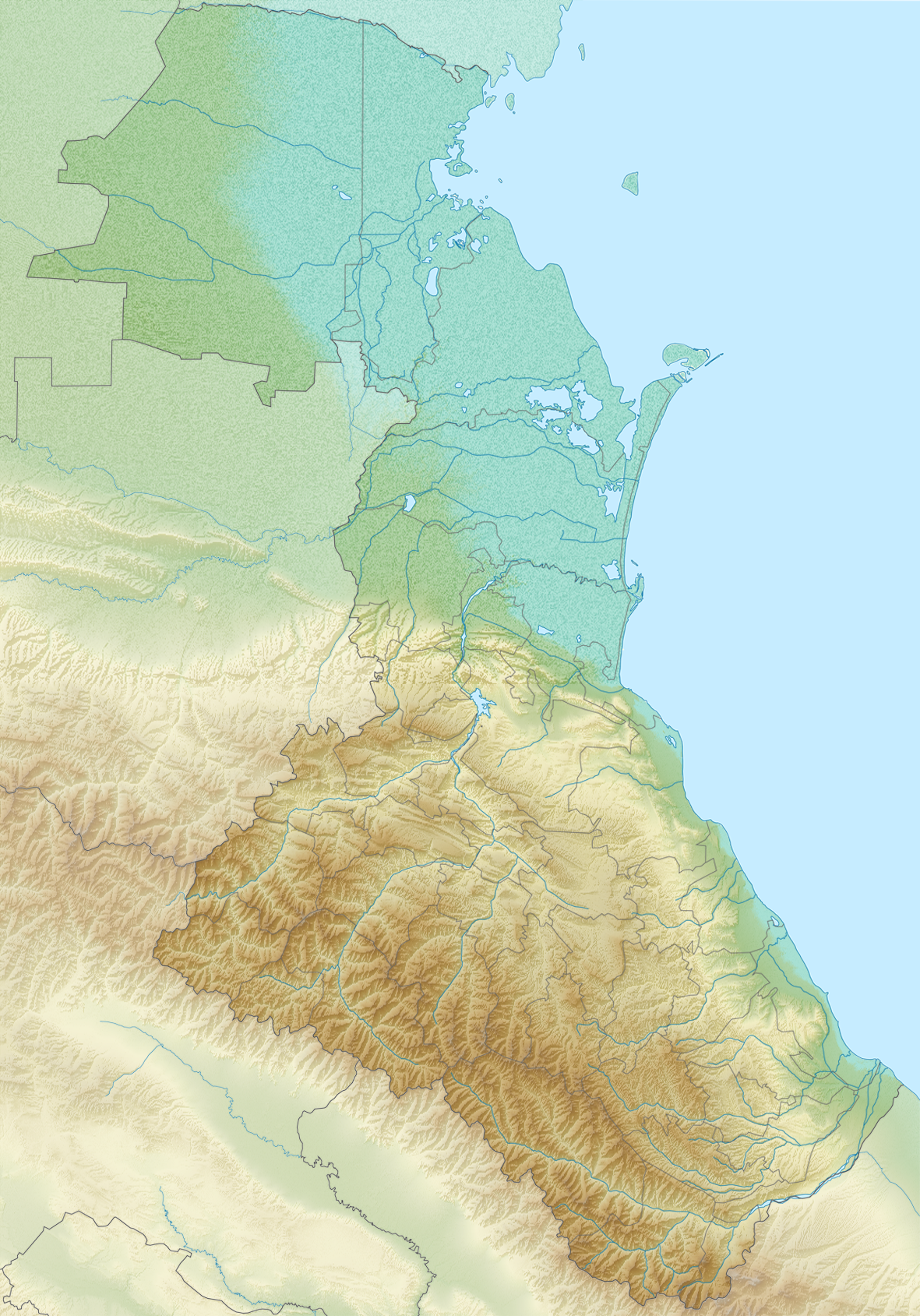
- Location within Republic of Dagestan Location within Russia
- Official name: Chirkey GES
- Country: Russia
- Location: Dagestan
- Coordinates: 42°58′37″N 46°52′16″E
- Status: In use
- Construction began: 1964
- Opening date: 1976
- Owner: RusHydro

Dam and spillways
- Type of dam: Arch
- Impounds: Sulak River
- Height: 232.5 m (763 ft)
- Length: 338 m (1,109 ft)
- Width (crest): 6 m (20 ft)
- Width (base): 30 m (98 ft)
- Dam volume: 1,275,000 m^{3} (45,026,200 ft^{3})
- Spillways: 1
- Spillway type: Service, flood discharge tunnel
- Spillway capacity: 2,900 m^{3}/s (102,413 cu ft/s)

Reservoir
- Creates: Chirkey Reservoir
- Total capacity: 2,780,000,000 m^{3} (2,253,783 acre⋅ft)
- Catchment area: 11,290 km^{2} (4,359 sq mi)
- Surface area: 42.4 km^{2} (16 sq mi)
- Maximum water depth: 200 m (656 ft)

Power Station
- Commission date: 1974-1976
- Hydraulic head: 205 m (673 ft) (max.)
- Turbines: 4 × 250 MW Francis-type
- Installed capacity: 1,000 MW
- Annual generation: 2.47 billion kWh

The Chirkey Dam (Chirkeisk GES) is an arch dam on the Sulak River in Dagestan, Russia. The main purpose of the dam is hydroelectric power production, and it supports a 1,000 MW power station. Construction on the dam began in 1964, the first generator was operational by 1974, the last in 1976 while the project was officially completed in 1978. It is the tallest arch dam in Russia.

== Design ==
The dam is a 232.5 m (763 ft) tall and 338 m (1,109 ft) long (crest) concrete arch dam. It is 6 m (20 ft) wide at its crest, 30 m (98 ft) wide at its base and contains 1,275,000 m^{3} (45,026,200 ft^{3}) of concrete. The dam withholds a 2,780,000,000 m^{3} (2,253,783 acre⋅ft) reservoir of which 1,320,000,000 m^{3} (1,070,141 acre⋅ft) is active or "useful" storage. The reservoir has a surface area of 42.4 km^{2} (16 sq mi), length of 40 km (25 mi) and maximum width of 5 km (3 mi). Maximum depth of the reservoir is 200 m (656 ft) and its catchment area is 11,290 km^{2} (4,359 sq mi).

The dam's spillway consists of a 509 m (1,670 ft) long non-pressure tunnel with its intake on the left bank of the dam. The spillway's capacity is 2,900 m^{3}/s (102,413 cu ft/s). The dam's outlet works, spillway and power station have a combined discharge capacity of 3,550 m^{3}/s (125,367 cu ft/s).

The dam's power station contains 4 × 250 MW Francis turbine-generators for a total installed capacity of 1,000 MW. Each generator is supplied with water by a penstock, all four of which intake on the upstream side of the dam's face and run down its surface toward the power station at the dam's base.

== See also ==
- List of power stations in Russia
