= Thomas Abbey =

Ghanaian association football player

Thomas Arnold Arnetey Abbey
Personal information
- Full name: Thomas Arnold Arnetey Abbey
- Date of birth: 16 August 1993 (age 33)
- Place of birth: Winneba, Ghana
- Height: 1.70 m (5 ft 7 in)
- Position: Midfielder

Team information
- Current team: PKNP F.C.
- Number: 12

Youth career
- 2000–2005: Soccer Intellectuals
- 2010–2011: Windy Professionals

Senior career*
Years	Team	Apps	(Gls)
2010–2017	Hearts of Oak	86	(31)
2018	Ismaily SC	6	(2)
2019–	PKNP F.C.	16	(2)

International career^{‡}
2013–2016	Ghana U-23	22	(6)
2017	Ghana	3	(0)
- * Club domestic league appearances and goals as of 14 February 2019 ‡ National team caps and goals as of 23:48, 17 June 2019 (UTC)

Thomas Abbey (born 16 August 1993) is a Ghanaian professional football midfielder who currently plays for Malaysian club PKNP F.C. Abbey played for Malaysia Premier League club PKNP F.C.

== Career ==
Thomas began his career at Soccer Intellectuals in 2000–2005. In the 2010–11 season, Abbey joined Hearts of Oak from divisional club Windy Professionals.

In 2018, Abbey ended his six years stay at Hearts of Oak and signed a two-year contract with Egyptian club Ismaily SC.

=== Ismaily SC ===
Abbey's contract at Ismaily SC was terminated on 1 August 2018 after reaching a mutual agreement.

=== PKNP FC ===
On 16 January 2019, Abbey signed for Malaysia Super League club, PKNP FC. He was out for weeks after picking a foot injury in the Malaysia Super League, during a Malaysia FA Cup clash with Perak FA on Saturday 12 May 2019. He underwent a successful surgery at a hospital at Ipoh. He has scored two goals in his 16 appearances for PKNP FC in his debut season.

== International ==
Abbey was a member of the Ghana Black Stars Team B who won the 2017 WAFU Nations Cup in Ghana.

== Honours ==
Hearts of Oak

- Ghana FA Cup runner up: 2016–17

Ismaily

- Egyptian Premier League runner up: 2017–18

Individual

- Hearts of Oak Player of the Month: July 2017
- Sports Writers Association of Ghana Home based Player of the Year: 2017
- Hearts of Oak Player Of The Year Award: 2017
