= Abu Bakar Fadzim =

Malaysian footballer and coach

Personal information
- Full name: Abu Bakar bin Fadzim
- Date of birth: 29 August 1971 (age 55)
- Place of birth: Penang, Malaysia
- Height: 1.73 m (5 ft 8 in)
- Position: Defender

Team information
- Current team: Perak FA II (Head coach)

Youth career
- 1990: Perak

Senior career*
| Years | Team | Apps | (Gls) |
| 1991–1992 | PDRM | 31 | (3) |
| 1993–1998 | Perak | 13 | (1) |
| 1999 | Perlis | 20 | (2) |
| 2000–2003 | Perak | 33 | (3) |
| Total | | 97 | (9) |

Managerial career
- 2009: Perak (youth)
- 2010: Perak (assistant)
- 2011–2013: Perak FA (youth)
- 2010–2011: Perak Malay FA
- 2013–2014: Perak
- 2014–2015: Perak (assistant)
- 2015–: Perak FA II
- * Club domestic league appearances and goals

Abu Bakar bin Fadzim (born 29 August 1971) is a Malaysian football coach and former football player. He is the head coach of Malaysia Premier League club Perak FA II.

== Playing career ==
Abu Bakar played for Perak from 1991 to 2003, except in 1999 when he played for Perlis. Abu Bakar also played for PDRM during his early playing career. Among his achievements as a player was winning the Malaysia Cup with Perak in 1998 and 2000.

== Coaching career ==
Abu Bakar took a job as an assistant technical director with Perak after retiring as a player. He has been the assistant head coach for Perak senior team under Yang Mulia Raja Azlan Shah Raja So'ib for 2010 season.

He took over the Perak President's Cup Head coach job in 2011 having been the assistant coach for the team under Raja Azlan from 2007, the last time Perak win the competition. He guided the team to win the President's Cup competition in 2012. He was also the head coach of Perak Malay FA team who is competing in the Piala Emas Raja-Raja (Regent's Gold Cup in Malay) competition.

He was appointed as head coach of Perak in October 2013, after the resignation of Azraai Khor. He holds this position until October 2014, where he was demoted to assistant head coach after the appointment of Vjeran Simunić as head coach.

On 31 July 2015, Abu Bakar has been appointed as the PKNP FC as the club's head coach.

== Managerial statistics ==
As of match played 26 July 2018

Managerial record by team and tenure
| Team | From | To | Record | | | | | Ref. |
| Team | From | To | P | W | D | L | Win % | Ref. |
|---|---|---|---|---|---|---|---|---|
| Perak FA II | 31 July 2016 | Present | 81 | 42 | 15 | 24 | 51.9 | |
| Total | | | 81 | 42 | 15 | 24 | 51.9 | — |
