= Hafiz Ramdan =

Malaysian footballer

Personal information
- Full name: Mohamad Hafiz bin Ramdan
- Date of birth: 28 June 1993 (age 33)
- Place of birth: Batu Kurau, Perak, Malaysia
- Height: 1.69 m (5 ft 6 1/2 in)
- Position: Midfielder

Team information
- Current team: PT Athletic F.C.
- Number: 33

Youth career
- 2011–2014: Perak U-21

Senior career*
Years	Team	Apps	(Gls)
2014–2017	Perak	28	(1)
2017	→ PKNP (loan)	15	(4)
2018–2019	PKNP	11	(3)
2020	Perak	7	(0)
2021	Sri Pahang	8	(0)
2022	→ Perak	6	(0)
2023	Negeri Sembilan FC	24	(1)
2024	Putrajaya Athletic FC	11	(1)
- * Club domestic league appearances and goals

Mohamad Hafiz bin Ramdan (born 28 June 1993) is a Malaysian professional footballer who plays as a midfielder.

== Club career ==
In 2021 Hafiz Ramdan signed for Sri Pahang FC.

He was officially announced as a new Negeri Sembilan FC player on 14 January 2023.

== Career statistics ==
=== Club ===
As of 1 July 2018

Club	Season	League		Cup		League Cup		Continental		Total	
Club	Season	Apps	Goals	Apps	Goals	Apps	Goals	Apps	Goals	Apps	Goals
PKNP	2017	7	3	0	0	4	1	–	–	11	4
PKNP	2018	11	3	4	0	0	0	–	–	15	3
PKNP	Total	18	6	4	0	4	1	0	0	26	7
Career total		0	0	0	0	0	0	0	0	0	0
