= Shah Alam Antlers =

Malaysian football club

- Full name: Shah Alam Antlers Football Club
- Nicknames: Bianco Azzuro (White and Blue); The Antlers
- Short name: SAAFC
- Founded: September 2016; 9 years ago
- Ground: JKR Stadium, Shah Alam
- Capacity: 400
- Owner: Shah Alam Antlers LLP
- Chairman: Ahmad Suffian Mamat
- Coach: Ariff Hashim
- League: Malaysia A3 Community League
- 2025–26: TBD
- Website: shahalamantlers.com
Home colours	Away colours

Shah Alam Antlers Football Club is a Malaysian semi-professional football club based in Shah Alam, Selangor, that competes in the A Ligue Champions League, which is part of the Malaysia A3 Community League, the 4th tier of the Malaysian football league system.

== History ==
Established in September 2016 by seven football enthusiasts including local supporters, a sports marketing specialist, media veterans, and legal experts seeking a fresh, community-centered model of Malaysian football. Inspired by European clubs such as SC Freiburg, Kashima Antlers, and Western Sydney Wanderers FC, the name “Antlers” signifies both sporting ambition and identity. From the outset, the club's motto was "All Unite for the City," with supporters integrated into decision-making as founding members

The club's home grounds are Panasonic Sports Complex Stadium or Antlersland in Seksyen 21, Shah Alam.

Antlers had their first silverware in 2017, when they won the Klang Valley League in their debut season. They finished the league with an unbeaten run of 14 wins and 1 draw.

== Rivalries and local derby ==
Shah Alam Antlers have a rivalry with the other club from the city, Shah Alam United. This rivalry is known as the "Shah Alam Derby".

Rivalry with Puchong Fuerza, Shah Alam Antlers also have intense rivalry with Puchong Fuerza. This rivalry is driven due to the fact that both clubs have a decent fan base for an amateur city based Football Clubs.

== Stadium ==
Shah Alam Antlers are mainly based at JKR Stadium, located in Seksyen 17, Shah Alam. The stadium can currently hold a maximum capacity of about 400 people.

== Sponsorship ==
Shah Alam Antlers are sponsored by a number of firms in different kinds of fields. In terms of venue, Shah Alam Antlers are sponsored by MBSA, the owners of their main stadium. 100plus is the official isotonic drink sponsor for the club. To engage with people online and boost their popularity, Shah Alam Antlers also have media partnerships with Asiana.my, an agency well known in Malaysia for sports photography and SemuanyaBola, a famous football online portal. Shah Alam Antlers also have a partnership with Homebois Hub where they make merchandises such as t-shirts, scarves and other club-related items.

== Honours ==
=== League ===
- Fourth Division (Klang Valley League)
- (gold) Winners (1): 2017

== Team officials ==
- President: Ahmad Suffian Mamat
- Team manager: Khairul Effendy
- Head coach: Arif Hashim
- Assistant coach: Ibrahim Madaki, Ajib Hashim
- Goalkeeping coach: Redzuan Harun
- Physio: Amirul Khairi
