= Perak F.C. II =

Professional football club

Perak II
- Full name: Perak Football Club II
- Nickname(s): The Bos Gaurus
- Founded: 5 July 2015; 10 years ago, as PKNP
- Dissolved: 2025; 0 years ago
- Ground: Perak Stadium
- Capacity: 42,500
- Owner: XOX Berhad
- Coach: Chan Wing Hoong
- League: MFL Cup
- 2024–25: 7th in Championship round
- Website: www.perakfc.com.my
Home colours	Away colours

Perak Football Club II, also named as Perak II, was the reserve team of Perak, based in Ipoh, in the state of Perak.

== History ==
Perak State Development Corporation Football Club, also known as PKNP, (Malay: Kelab Bolasepak Perbadanan Kemajuan Negeri Perak) was converted as part of the feeder club regulations for the 2020 season as a reserve team of Perak in the MFL Cup, holding home games at the Manjung Stadium. The club was dissolved after Perak confirmed their relegation from the Super League.

== Sponsorship ==
Period	Sportswear	Sponsor
2016	(United States) Nike	PKNP
2017	(Germany) Puma	Perak Corporation
2018	(Italy) Fila	PKNP, Perak Corporation, Maps, Lumut Port
2019	(England) Admiral	PKNP, Maps, Perak Corporation, MPM, Casuarina
2020	(Spain) Kelme	Visit Perak (home), Pangkor Duty Free Island (away)
2021	(Malaysia) Kaki Jersi	Lenggong Valley (home), Royal Belum (away)

== Stadium and location ==
Coordinates	Location	Stadium	Capacity	Year
4°36′33.96″N 101°6′12.38″E	Ipoh	Perak Stadium	27,036	2016 – 2021
4°11′41.6″N 100°39′54.2″E	Manjung	Manjung Municipal Council Stadium	15,000	2019 – 2023

== Season by season record ==
Season	League									Top goalscorer		FA Cup	Malaysia Cup
Season	Division	P	W	D	L	F	A	Pts	Pos	Name	Goals	FA Cup	Malaysia Cup
2016	Malaysia FAM League	14	9	3	2	26	9	30	1st	(Malaysia) Shahrel Fikri	20	DNQ	DNQ
2017	Malaysia Premier League	22	14	4	4	41	23	46	3rd	(Malaysia) Shahrel Fikri	11	Quarter-finals	Quarter-finals
2018	Malaysia Super League	22	7	4	11	25	31	25	9th	(Malaysia) Hafiz Ramdan	3	Semi-finals	Group D
2019	Malaysia Super League	22	3	7	12	22	40	16	11th	(Malaysia) Hafiz Ramdan	3	Quarter-finals	Quarter-finals

== Players (2023) ==
Note: Flags indicate national team as defined under FIFA eligibility rules; some limited exceptions apply. Players may hold more than one non-FIFA nationality.

No.	Pos.	Nation	Player
1	GK	(Malaysia) MAS	Ahmad Syazwan Syazany
2	DF	(Malaysia) MAS	Fadhil Azmi
3	DF	(Malaysia) MAS	Che Mohd Suhairi
5	MF	(Malaysia) MAS	Firdaus Ahmad Fuad
7	FW	(Malaysia) MAS	Hakimi Mat Isa
8	MF	(Malaysia) MAS	Ahmad Syakirin Ahmad Zamri
9	FW	(Malaysia) MAS	Syahmi Shamsudin
10	FW	(Malaysia) MAS	Hadi Mohamad
11	DF	(Malaysia) MAS	Aiman Khairul Yusni
13	DF	(Malaysia) MAS	Felix Adriano
14	MF	(Malaysia) MAS	Al-Azim Asri
15	DF	(Malaysia) MAS	Nik Umar Nik Azizi
16	DF	(Malaysia) MAS	Hafizy Daniel Termizi
18	MF	(Malaysia) MAS	Amirul Aiman Nasaruddin
20	MF	(Malaysia) MAS	Amirul Akmal Safarinizam
21	DF	(Malaysia) MAS	Kamal Arif Azrai

No.	Pos.	Nation	Player
22	GK	(Malaysia) MAS	Zulkifli Yusoff (Captain)
23	GK	(Malaysia) MAS	Taufiq Nasir
24	DF	(Malaysia) MAS	Zul Fikri Jamilulhayat
28	FW	(Malaysia) MAS	Alif Zikri Zaini
31	MF	(Malaysia) MAS	Akmal Hazim Ismail
33	MF	(Malaysia) MAS	Ikhwan Firdaus Zaidi
38	FW	(Malaysia) MAS	Hijjaz Hakimi Romdan
39	GK	(Malaysia) MAS	Azeem Farhan Fazis (Vice-Captain)
57	DF	(Malaysia) MAS	Ammar Idzham
66	DF	(Malaysia) MAS	Oswyn Lim

== Coaching staff (2023) ==
Team manager	(Malaysia) Mohd Daud Chuah Abdullah
Head coach	(Malaysia) Chan Wing Hoong
Assistant coach	(Malaysia) S. Sathia Kumaran
Assistant coach	(Malaysia) Shahrulnizam Mustapa
Goalkeeping coach	(Malaysia) Ng Wei Xian
Fitness coach	(Malaysia) Abu Mutalib Baeman
Team doctor	(Malaysia) Vijay Babu a/l Subramaniam
Physio	(Malaysia) Muhammad Isamuddin Ali Wahid Ali
Masseur	(Malaysia) Khairul Azlan Shah Ridan
Team analyst	(Malaysia) Muhammed Asyraf Fauzi
Kitman	(Malaysia) Mohd Suhaimi Abidin
Team media	(Malaysia) Muhammad Fareez Salehudin

== See also ==
- Perak FA President and Youth
