= 2019 Kuala Lumpur FA season =

Kuala Lumpur
2019 season
- President: (Malaysia) Adnan Md Ikhsan
- Head coach: (Malaysia) Yusri Che Lah (until 11 March 2019) (Malaysia) Chong Yee Fatt (caretaker)
- Stadium: Kuala Lumpur Stadium
- Malaysia Super League: 12th (relegated)
- Malaysia FA Cup: Quarter-finals
- Malaysia Challenge Cup: Group stage
- Top goalscorer: League: Guilherme (8 goals); All: Guilherme (11 goals)
Home colours	Away colours

The 2019 season was Kuala Lumpur's 41st season in competitive season and the 2nd season in Malaysia Super League since being promoted after winning the 2017 Malaysia Premier League.

== Players ==
Note: Flags indicate national team as defined under FIFA eligibility rules; some limited exceptions apply. Players may hold more than one non-FIFA nationality.

No.	Pos.	Nation	Player
1	GK	(Malaysia) MAS	Faridzuean Kamaruddin
2	DF	(Malaysia) MAS	Raphi Azizan
3	DF	(Malaysia) MAS	Fitri Omar
4	DF	(Malaysia) MAS	Zaiful Hakim
5	MF	(Malaysia) MAS	Hardee Shamsuri
6	MF	(Malaysia) MAS	Haziq Mu'iz
8	MF	(Malaysia) MAS	Zhafri Yahya
9	MF	(Malaysia) MAS	Darko Marković
10	FW	(Brazil) BRA	Guilherme de Paula
11	FW	(Malaysia) MAS	Ashri Chuchu
12	MF	(Malaysia) MAS	Fakri Saarani
13	FW	(Malaysia) MAS	Afiq Razali
14	FW	(Malaysia) MAS	Syafwan Syahlan
16	DF	(Philippines) PHI	Luke Woodland
17	DF	(Malaysia) MAS	Irfan Zakaria

No.	Pos.	Nation	Player
18	DF	(Malaysia) MAS	Azmi Muslim
19	DF	(Malaysia) MAS	Firdaus Faudzi
20	GK	(Malaysia) MAS	Kamarul Effandi
21	FW	(Malaysia) MAS	Na'im Nazmi
22	FW	(Malaysia) MAS	Arif Anwar
23	MF	(Malaysia) MAS	Indra Putra Mahayuddin (captain)
24	DF	(Malaysia) MAS	Hisyamudin Sha'ari
25	GK	(Malaysia) MAS	Sharbinee Allawee
26	GK	(Malaysia) MAS	Ameerul Eqhwan
27	DF	(Malaysia) MAS	Hafiz Johar
28	MF	(Brazil) BRA	Paulo Josué
29	DF	(Malaysia) MAS	Alif Samsudin
30	MF	(Malaysia) MAS	Amirul Ikmal
51	DF	(South Korea) KOR	Noh Haeng-seok
55	FW	(Malaysia) MAS	Shafiq Shaharudin (on loan from PKNS)

=== Out on loan ===
Note: Flags indicate national team as defined under FIFA eligibility rules; some limited exceptions apply. Players may hold more than one non-FIFA nationality.

No.	Pos.	Nation	Player
29	GK	(Malaysia) MAS	Khatul Anuar (at UKM until end of the season)

== Competitions ==
=== Malaysia Super League ===
==== Matches ====
The Malaysian Football League (MFL) announced the fixtures for the 2019 season on 22 December 2018.

Date	Opponents	H / A	Result F–A	Scorers	League position
1 February 2019	Pahang	H	1–3	Afiq 49'	11th ▼
8 February 2019	Johor Darul Ta'zim	A	1–4	Comvalius 77'	12th ▼
22 February 2019	Terengganu	H	0–1		12th
3 March 2019	Melaka United	A	0–2		12th
10 March 2019	Selangor	H	2–3	Syafwan 5, Indra 38'	12th
30 March 2019	PKNP	A	0–4		12th
6 April 2019	Kedah	H	2–1	Woodland 10', Guilherme 50'	12th
13 April 2019	Felda United	A	1–1	Indra 57'	12th
20 April 2019	Petaling Jaya City	H	1–0	Ashri 50'	12th
23 April 2019	Perak	H	3–3	Indra 21', Guilherme 44' (pen.), Paulo Josué 65'	11th ▲
27 April 2019	PKNS	A	2–3	Indra 42', Guilherme 82'	12th ▼
3 May 2019	Kedah	A	2–5	Indra 45+1', Guilherme 78'	12th
14 May 2019	PKNS	H	2–1	Indra 28', Azmi 57'	11th ▲
17 May 2019	Petaling Jaya City	A	0–1		11th
26 May 2019	PKNP	H	4–1	Paulo Josué 12', Guilherme (3) 15', 17' (pen.), 90'	10th ▲
15 June 2019	Selangor	A	1–2	Guilherme 59' (pen.)	10th
19 June 2019	Melaka United	H	0–1		10th
26 June 2019	Terengganu	A	1–3	Marković 41'	10th
6 July 2019	Pahang	A	0–2		11th ▼
10 July 2019	Felda United	H	0–2		12th ▼
13 July 2019	Johor Darul Ta'zim	H	0–4		12th
21 July 2019	Perak	A	1–2	Woodland 77'	12th

==== League table ====
Pos	Team	Pld	W	D	L	GF	GA	GD	Pts	Qualification or relegation
8	Petaling Jaya City	22	8	2	12	22	29	−7	26	
9	PKNS (Note: PKNS F.C. relegated after withdrawing license to complete for the 2020 Malaysia Premier League season as they become feeder club to Selangor FA.) (R)	22	5	6	11	37	38	−1	21	Relegation to Malaysia Premier League
10	Felda United	22	4	7	11	27	43	−16	19	
11	PKNP (R)	22	3	7	12	22	40	−18	16	Relegation to Malaysia Premier League
12	Kuala Lumpur (R)	22	4	2	16	24	49	−25	14	Relegation to Malaysia Premier League

Source: MFL
Rules for classification: 1) Points; 2) Goal difference; 3) Number of goals scored.
(R) Relegated

=== Malaysia FA Cup ===
Date	Round	Opponents	H / A	Result F–A	Scorers
3 April 2019	Round 2	Tun Razak	H	3–0	Indra 33', Irfan 56', Guilherme 71'
16 April 2019	Round 3	Penang	A	4–2	Zaiful 3', Irfan 14', Guilherme (2) 36', 64' (pen.)
30 April 2019	Quarter-finals First leg	Felda United	H	3–3	Indra (2) 41', 54', Paulo Josué 80'
11 May 2019	Quarter-finals Second leg	Felda United	A	0–0	

=== Malaysia Challenge Cup ===
Pos	Team	Pld	W	D	L	GF	GA	GD	Pts	Qualification	UKM	TER	KLU	SEU
1	UKM	6	3	3	0	12	6	+6	12	Advance to Semi-finals	—	2–2	3–0	3–1
2	Terengganu II	6	3	2	1	11	8	+3	11	Advance to Semi-finals	2–2	—	2–1	2–0
3	Kuala Lumpur	6	2	0	4	6	9	−3	6		1–2	1–0	—	3–1
4	Selangor United	6	1	1	4	5	11	−6	4		0–0	2–3	1–0	—

Source: Malaysian Football League

== Squad statistics ==
No.	Pos.	Name	League		FA Cup		Challenge Cup		Total		Discipline	
No.	Pos.	Name	Apps	Goals	Apps	Goals	Apps	Goals	Apps	Goals	Yellow card	Red card
1	GK	(Malaysia) Faridzuean Kamaruddin	7	0	0(1)	0	0	0	7(1)	0	2	0
3	DF	(Malaysia) Fitri Omar	6(5)	0	1(1)	0	0	0	7(6)	0	8	0
4	DF	(Malaysia) Zaiful Hakim	6(5)	0	3	1	0	0	9(5)	1	3	0
6	MF	(Malaysia) Haziq Mu'iz	0(1)	0	0	0	0	0	0(1)	0	0	0
8	MF	(Malaysia) Zhafri Yahya	17(1)	0	4	0	0	0	21(1)	0	7	0
9	MF	(Serbia) Darko Marković	8	1	1	0	0	0	9	1	3	0
10	FW	(Brazil) Guilherme de Paula	16	8	4	3	0	0	20	11	4	0
11	FW	(Malaysia) Ashri Chuchu	17(1)	1	4	0	0	0	21(1)	1	2	0
12	FW	(Malaysia) Fakri Saarani	2(6)	0	0	0	0	0	2(6)	0	0	0
13	FW	(Malaysia) Afiq Razali	0(5)	1	0	0	0	0	0(5)	1	0	0
14	FW	(Malaysia) Syafwan Syahlan	2(3)	1	0(1)	0	0	0	2(4)	1	0	0
16	MF	(Philippines) Luke Woodland	16	2	3	0	0	0	19	2	1	1
17	DF	(Malaysia) Irfan Zakaria	21	0	4	2	0	0	25	1	4	0
18	DF	(Malaysia) Azmi Muslim	15(1)	1	3(1)	0	0	0	18(2)	1	0	0
19	DF	(Malaysia) Firdaus Faudzi	14(3)	0	1(1)	0	0	0	15(4)	0	2	0
20	GK	(Malaysia) Kamarul Effandi	0	0	1	0	0	0	1	0	0	0
21	MF	(Malaysia) Na'im Nazmi	1	0	1(1)	0	0	0	2(1)	0	0	0
22	FW	(Malaysia) Arif Anwar	4(7)	0	0(3)	0	0	0	4(10)	0	2	0
23	FW	(Malaysia) Indra Putra Mahayuddin	21	6	4	3	0	0	25	9	4	0
24	DF	(Malaysia) Hisyamudin Sha'ari	5(4)	0	0(1)	0	0	0	5(5)	0	1	0
25	GK	(Malaysia) Sharbinee Allawee	15	0	3	0	0	0	18	0	2	0
27	DF	(Malaysia) Hafiz Johar	6(4)	0	1(1)	0	0	0	7(5)	0	0	0
28	MF	(Brazil) Paulo Josué	21	2	3	1	0	0	24	3	6	0
29	DF	(Malaysia) Alif Samsudin	4(2)	0	1	0	0	0	5(2)	0	3	0
51	DF	(South Korea) Noh Haeng-seok	5(1)	0	0	0	0	0	5(1)	0	1	0
55	FW	(Malaysia) Shafiq Shaharudin	0(4)	0	0	0	0	0	0(4)	0	1	0
Players who left the club permanently or on loan during the season
7	MF	(Japan) Ryutaro Karube	5	0	2(1)	0	0	0	7(1)	0	0	0
9	FW	(Netherlands) Sylvano Comvalius	3(2)	1	0	0	0	0	3(2)	1	0	0

Statistics accurate as of 21 July 2019.

== Transfers ==
=== In ===
Date	Pos.	Name	From	Fee	Ref.
1 December 2018	FW	(Malaysia) Arif Anwar	(Malaysia) Petaling Jaya Rangers	Undisclosed	
4 December 2018	FW	(Netherlands) Sylvano Comvalius	(Thailand) Suphanburi	Undisclosed	
14 December 2018	MF	(Japan) Ryutaro Karube	(Thailand) Chainat Hornbill	Undisclosed	
26 December 2018	GK	(Malaysia) Faridzuean Kamaruddin	(Malaysia) Kelantan	Undisclosed	
26 December 2018	DF	(Malaysia) Khair Jones	(Malaysia) Melaka United	Undisclosed	
26 December 2018	DF	(Malaysia) Fitri Omar	(Malaysia) Terengganu	Undisclosed	
26 December 2018	DF	(Malaysia) Alif Samsudin	(Malaysia) Felcra	Undisclosed	
28 December 2018	MF	(Malaysia) Haziq Mu'iz Abdul	(Malaysia) Felcra	Undisclosed	
18 February 2019	MF	(Philippines) Luke Woodland	(Thailand) Suphanburi	Undisclosed	
18 March 2019	DF	(Malaysia) Azmi Muslim	(Malaysia) Perlis	Free	
7 May 2019	MF	(Serbia) Darko Marković	(Malaysia) Sabah	Undisclosed	
29 May 2019	DF	(Malaysia) Raphi Azizan	(Malaysia) Puchong Fuerza	Free	
29 May 2019	FW	(Malaysia) Fakri Saarani	Unattached		
29 May 2019	DF	(South Korea) Noh Haeng-seok	(South Korea) Busan IPark	Undisclosed	

=== Out ===
Date	Pos.	Name	To	Fee	Ref.
1 November 2018	DF	(Malaysia) Hazwan Rahman	Released		
19 November 2018	DF	(Uzbekistan) Bobirjon Akbarov	Released		
19 November 2018	MF	(Brazil) Júnior Aparecido	Released		
19 November 2018	DF	(Malaysia) Farid Ramli	Released		
19 November 2018	FW	(Malaysia) Ibrahim Syaihul	Released		
19 November 2018	DF	(Malaysia) Azmeer Yusof	(Malaysia) Kedah	Undisclosed	
14 December 2018	DF	(Malaysia) Saifulnizam Miswan	Released		
17 December 2018	FW	(Malaysia) Zaquan Adha	(Malaysia) Kedah	Undisclosed	
13 January 2019	DF	(Malaysia) Syazwan Andik	(Malaysia) Johor Darul Ta'zim	Undisclosed	
14 February 2019	DF	(Indonesia) Achmad Jufriyanto	Released		
24 April 2019	FW	(Netherlands) Sylvano Comvalius	(Indonesia) Arema	Undisclosed	
24 June 2019	DF	(Japan) Ryutaro Karube	(Thailand) Chainat Hornbill	Undisclosed	

=== Loans in ===
Date from	Date to	Pos.	Name	From	Ref.
1 June 2019	End of season	FW	(Malaysia) Shafiq Shaharudin	(Malaysia) PKNS	

=== Loans out ===
Date from	Date to	Pos.	Name	To	Ref.
6 January 2019	End of season	GK	(Malaysia) Khatul Anuar	(Malaysia) UKM	
