= 2019 Perak TBG F.C. season =

Perak FC
2019 season
- President: Ahmad Faizal Azumu
- Manager: Adly Shah Ahmad Tah
- Head coach: Mehmet Duraković
- Stadium: Perak Stadium
- Malaysia Super League: 5th
- Malaysia FA Cup: Runners-up
- Malaysia Cup: Quarter-finals
- Charity Shield: Runners-up
- AFC Champions League: Play-off round
- Top goalscorer: League: Careca (7 goals); All: Careca; Ronaldo (8 goals)
Home colours	Away colours

The 2020 season was Perak FC's 16th consecutive season in Malaysia Super League, the top flight of Malaysian football. The club also will participate in the Malaysia FA Cup, Malaysia Cup and the AFC Champions League.

== Management team ==
Position	Name
Team manager	(Malaysia) Adly Shah Ahmad Tah
Head coach	(Australia) Mehmet Duraković
Assistant head coach	(Malaysia) Shahril Nizam Khalil
Goalkeeper coach	(Malaysia) Hamsani Ahmad
Fitness coach	(Malaysia) Sam Pakiaraj
Physiotherapist	(Malaysia) Zainuddin Zakariar
Team doctor	(Malaysia) Vijay Babu Subramaniam
Kitman	(Malaysia) Fahmi Azmil Aziz
Kitman	(Malaysia) Helmi Jamil
Masseurs	(Malaysia) Izwan Sudin
Masseurs	(Malaysia) Syazrin Ahmad
Security officer	(Malaysia) Roslan Khan
Administration officer	(Malaysia) Zubir Shaharani
Media officer	(Malaysia) Syahiran Rosli

== Players ==
No.	Pos.	Player	Nationality	Date of birth (age)	Since	Signed from
1	GK	Nasrullah Aziz	(Malaysia)	17 December 1997 (age 27)	2018	Youth system
3	DF	Shahrul Saad	(Malaysia)	8 July 1993 (age 32)	2016	Felda United
4	MF	Nasir Basharudin	(Malaysia)	29 March 1990 (age 35)	2010	Youth system
5	DF	Hussein Eldor	(Lebanon)	18 January 1994 (age 31)	2019	Churchill Brothers
7	MF	Khairil Anuar	(Malaysia)	8 March 1995 (age 30)	2015	Youth system
8	MF	Leandro Dos Santos	(Brazil)	29 October 1986 (age 39)	2017	Luverdense
9	FW	Ronaldo	(Brazil)	10 April 1991 (age 34)	2019	XV de Piracicaba
10	FW	Shahrel Fikri	(Malaysia)	17 October 1994 (age 31)	2019	PKNP
11	MF	Brendan Gan	(Malaysia)	3 June 1988 (age 37)	2018	Unattached
12	MF	Kenny Pallraj	(Malaysia)	21 April 1993 (age 32)	2016	Harimau Muda
14	MF	Firdaus Saiyadi	(Malaysia)	12 October 1996 (age 29)	2018	Unattached
15	DF	Idris Ahmad	(Malaysia)	5 May 1990 (age 35)	2017	Felda United
16	MF	Partiban Janasekaran	(Malaysia)	28 November 1992 (age 32)	2019	Terengganu
17	DF	Rizal Che Aziz	(Malaysia)	19 March 1996 (age 29)	2018	Youth system
18	GK	Khairul Amri	(Malaysia)	22 December 1989 (age 35)	2017	Penang
19	MF	Hakim Hassan	(Malaysia)	2 October 1991 (age 34)	2018	T-Team
21	DF	Nazirul Naim	(Malaysia)	6 April 1993 (age 32)	2016	Harimau Muda
22	GK	Hafizul Hakim	(Malaysia)	30 March 1993 (age 32)	2016	Melaka United
23	DF	Amirul Azhan	(Malaysia)	23 July 1993 (age 32)	2016	Youth system
24	DF	Shathiya Kandasamy	(Malaysia)	29 January 1990 (age 35)	2017	DRB-Hicom
25	DF	Rafiuddin Roddin	(Malaysia)	22 August 1989 (age 36)	2018	Penang
26	FW	Hamizul Izaidi	(Malaysia)	22 February 1993 (age 32)	2019	PKNP
30	FW	Careca	(Brazil)	26 August 1995 (age 30)	2019	Atlético Acreano
–	DF	Izzat Ramlee	(Malaysia)	21 June 1997 (age 28)	2019	Youth system

== Transfers ==
=== In ===
1st leg

No.	Pos.	Player	From	Date	Fee	Source
16	MF	(Malaysia) Partiban Janasekaran	(Malaysia) Terengganu	17 November 2018	Free	
6	DF	(Australia) Zac Anderson	(Malaysia) PKNS	27 December 2018	Free	
28	DF	(Malaysia) Nazirul Afif	(Malaysia) Youth system	1 December 2018	Free	
30	DF	(Malaysia) Izzat Ramlee	(Malaysia) Youth system	1 December 2018	Free	

2nd leg

No.	Pos.	Player	From	Date	Fee	Source
5	DF	(Lebanon) Hussein Eldor	(India) Churchill Brothers	17 May 2019	Undisclosed	
9	FW	(Brazil) Ronaldo	(Brazil) XV de Piracicaba	10 May 2019	Undisclosed	
30	FW	(Brazil) Careca	(Brazil) Atlético Acreano	10 May 2019	Undisclosed	

=== Loan in ===
1st leg

No.	Pos.	Player	From	Date	Until	Fee	Source
29	FW	(Malaysia) Shahrel Fikri	(Malaysia) PKNP	15 January 2019	31 December 2019	Undisclosed	

=== Loan out ===
2nd leg

No.	Pos.	Player	To	Date	Until	Fee	Source
2	DF	(Malaysia) Syazwan Zaipol	(Malaysia) PKNP	1 June 2019	31 December 2019	Undisclosed	
28	DF	(Malaysia) Nazirul Afif	(Malaysia) PKNP	1 June 2019	31 December 2019	Undisclosed	

=== Out ===
1st leg

No.	Pos.	Player	To	Date	Fee	Source
30	FW	(Malaysia) Nizad Ayub	Released			
20	MF	(Malaysia) Nazrin Nawi	(Malaysia) Melaka United	23 November 2018	Free	
5	DF	(Lebanon) Jad Noureddine	(Lebanon) Safa	30 November 2018	Free	
27	MF	(Malaysia) Hafiz Kamal	(Malaysia) PKNP	3 January 2019	Free	
13	FW	(Malaysia) Khairul Asyraf	(Malaysia) PKNP	23 January 2019	Free	
6	DF	(Malaysia) Rafiq Faeez	(Malaysia) PKNP	23 January 2019	Free	

2nd leg

No.	Pos.	Player	To	Date	Fee	Source
5	DF	(Australia) Zac Anderson	Released			
9	FW	(Brazil) Gilmar	(Brazil) Cuiabá	1 July 2019	Undisclosed	
10	MF	(Brazil) Wander Luiz	Released			

== Friendlies ==
=== Friendlies ===
7 January 2019 Friendly	PDRM	0–0	Perak	Ipoh
20:45 UTC+8				Stadium: Perak Stadium

13 January 2019 Friendly	Kedah	2–0	Perak	Alor Setar
20:45 UTC+8	Rodríguez 68'; Syahrul 76'			Stadium: Darul Aman Stadium

== Competitions ==
=== Malaysia Super League ===
==== League table ====
Pos	Team	Pld	W	D	L	GF	GA	GD	Pts	Qualification or relegation
3	Selangor	22	10	7	5	41	35	+6	37	
4	Kedah (Note: Kedah FA qualified for the AFC Champions League preliminary round 2 as Malaysia FA Cup winners.)	22	9	7	6	37	29	+8	34	Qualification for AFC Champions League preliminary round 2
5	Perak	22	8	9	5	36	31	+5	33	
6	Melaka United	22	9	6	7	34	30	+4	33	
7	Terengganu	22	7	9	6	35	37	−2	30	

Source: MFL
Rules for classification: 1) Points; 2) Goal difference; 3) Number of goals scored.

==== Results by matchday ====
Matchday	1	2	3	4	5	6	7	8	9	10	11	12	13	14	15	16	17	18	19	20	21	22
Ground	A	H	H	A	H	A	H	A	H	A	A	A	H	A	H	A	H	A	H	H	A	H
Result	L	D	D	D	W	D	D	D	L	D	W	D	W	D	L	W	W	W	L	W	L	W
Position	10	8	10	10	9	7	8	8	8	8	8	8	6	6	8	6	6	5	6	6	6	5

Updated to match(es) played on 21 July 2019. Source: Matches
A = Away; H = Home; W = Win; D = Draw; L = Loss

==== Matches ====
The Malaysian Football League (MFL) announced the fixtures for the 2019 season on 22 December 2018.

2 February 2019 1/Charity Shield	Johor Darul Ta'zim	1–0	Perak	Larkin
21:00 UTC+8	Cabrera 40'; Azrif (yellow card) 68'	Report	Partiban (yellow card) 62'; Azhan (yellow card) 82'; Brendan (yellow card) 87'	Stadium: Tan Sri Dato' Haji Hassan Yunos Stadium; Attendance: 22,510; Referee: Zulkarnain Zakaria

10 February 2019 2	Perak	1–1	Kedah	Ipoh
21:00 UTC+8	Gan 18'; Leandro (yellow card) 20'; Anderson (yellow card) 60'; Khairil (yellow card) 80'	Report	Bauman (yellow card) 15'; Alves 21'; Shakir (yellow card) 45'; Rizal (yellow card) 78'	Stadium: Perak Stadium; Referee: Hamdan Awang

23 February 2019 3	Perak	1–1	Felda United	Ipoh
21:00 UTC+8	Gilmar 71' (pen.), (yellow card) 88'	Report	Hadin 44'; Watanabe (yellow card) 45+1'; Haziq (yellow card) 75'; Jasazrin (yellow card) 89'; Norazalan (yellow card) 90+2'	Stadium: Perak Stadium; Referee: Fusser Mad Sallih

1 March 2019 4	Terengganu	1–1	Perak	Kuala Terengganu
21:00 UTC+8	Thiery (yellow card) 67'; Nasrullah (yellow card) 75'; Tuck 90+1' (pen.)	Report	Wander Luiz 72'; Idris (yellow card) 77'; Leandro (yellow card) 83'	Stadium: Sultan Ismail Nasiruddin Shah Stadium; Referee: Razlan Joffri Ali

9 March 2019 5	Perak	1–0	Petaling Jaya City	Ipoh
21:00 UTC+8	Wander Luiz 39' (pen.), (yellow card) 62'; Firdaus (yellow card) 62'; Kenny (yellow card) 80'	Report	Barathkumar (yellow card) 11'; Rajesh (yellow card) 19'; Safee (yellow card) 22'; Pedro Henrique (yellow card) 80'	Stadium: Perak Stadium; Referee: Nazmi Nasaruddin

29 March 2019 6	Melaka United	0–0	Perak	Krubong
21:00 UTC+8	Jang Suk-won (yellow card) 33'; Marković (yellow card) 59'; Khuzaimi (yellow card) 60'; Reichelt (yellow card) 67'; Shukor (yellow card) 67'	Report	Shahrul (yellow card) 67'; Hakim (yellow card) 88'	Stadium: Hang Jebat Stadium; Referee: Suhaimi Mat Hassan

7 April 2019 7	Perak	2–2	Melaka United	Ipoh
21:00 UTC+8	Shahrel 39'; Gilmar 53'	Report	Guerra 23'; Swirad (yellow card) 42'; Morales 56', (yellow card) 86'	Stadium: Perak Stadium; Referee: Suhaizi Shukri

12 April 2019 8	Selangor	1–1	Perak	Shah Alam
21:00 UTC+8	Sandro 20'; Nurridzuan (yellow card) 48' (yellow-red card) 57'; Amri (yellow card) 53'; Sean (yellow card) 72'	Report	Hakim 36'; Anderson (yellow card) 38'; Leandro (yellow card) 53'; Firdaus (yellow card) 59'; Wander Luiz (yellow card) 59'; Gan (yellow card) 83'; Khairil (yellow card) 86'	Stadium: Shah Alam Stadium; Referee: Zulkarnain Zakaria

20 April 2019 9	Perak	0–1	Pahang	Ipoh
21:00 UTC+8	Amirul (yellow card) 24'; Rafiuddin (yellow card) 80'	Report	Safuwan (yellow card) 40'; Azam (yellow card) 46' (yellow-red card) 72'; Goulon 56'; Saddil (yellow card) 67'; Sumareh (yellow card) 69'	Stadium: Perak Stadium; Referee: Razlan Joffri Ali

23 April 2019 10	Kuala Lumpur	3–3	Perak	Bandar Tun Razak
21:00 UTC+8	Zhafri (yellow card) 16'; Indra Putra 22'; Zaiful (yellow card) 28' de Paula 44' (pen.), (yellow card) 40'; Woodland (red card) 58'; Paulo Josué 65'; Faridzuean (yellow card) 81'; Arif (yellow card) 88'	Report	Zaiful 8' (o.g.); Nazirul (yellow card) 13' (yellow-red card) 64'; Leandro 29' (pen.), (yellow card) 62'; Shahrel (yellow card) 58'; Hakim 86'	Stadium: Kuala Lumpur Stadium; Referee: Zamzaidi Katimin

27 April 2019 11	PKNP	0–4	Perak	Manjung
21:00 UTC+8	Fadhil (yellow card) 36'	Report	Gan 13'; Gilmar 30', 90', (yellow card) 90+2'; Shahrul (yellow card) 34', (goal) 56'	Stadium: Manjung Municipal Council Stadium; Referee: Suhaizi Shukri

3 May 2019 12	PKNS	3–3	Perak	Shah Alam
21:00 UTC+8	Sherman 5', 52', (yellow card) 34'; Tommy (yellow card) 11'; Swirad 43'; Faizat (yellow card) 49'; Kozubaev (yellow card) 72'; Kannan (yellow card) 80'	Report	Gan 12'; Partiban 50'; Nasir (yellow card) 57'; Nazirul 81'	Stadium: Shah Alam Stadium; Referee: Khirulazuan Kidam

14 May 2019 13	Perak	3–1	PKNP	Ipoh
22:00 UTC+8	Careca 7', 71'; Ronaldo 29' (pen.); Leandro (yellow card) 31'; Shahrul (yellow card) 53'	Report	Aguinaldo (yellow card) 28'; Islame 38', (yellow card) 57'; Fadhil (yellow card) 64'; Giancarlo (yellow card) 76'	Stadium: Perak Stadium; Referee: Zamzaidi Katimin

19 May 2019 14	Pahang	0–0	Perak	Kuantan
22:00 UTC+8	Goulon (yellow card) 25'; Sumareh (yellow card) 37'; Faisal (yellow card) 40'; Zé Love (yellow card) 43'	Report	Leandro (yellow card) 72'; Amirul (yellow card) 89'	Stadium: Darul Makmur Stadium; Referee: Wan Mohamad Tarmizi

25 May 2019 15	Perak	2–3	Melaka United	Ipoh
22:00 UTC+8	Gan 18'; Partiban 57'	Report	Nazrin 23'; Safiq (yellow card) 33'; Balić (yellow card) 37'; Reichelt 45+1', 74'; Raimi (yellow card) 56'; Shukor (yellow card) 90'	Stadium: Perak Stadium; Referee: Razlan Joffri Ali

14 June 2019 16	Petaling Jaya City	0–1	Perak	Petaling Jaya
21:00 UTC+8	Satish (yellow card) 26'; Subramaniam (yellow card) 65' (yellow-red card) 68'; Elizeu (yellow card) 87'	Report	Ronaldo 19'; Eldor (yellow card) 49'; Amirul (yellow card) 53'; Kenny (yellow card) 61'; Gan (yellow card) 90+5'	Stadium: Petaling Jaya Stadium; Referee: Mat Zan Abd Wahab

18 June 2019 17	Perak	3–1	Terengganu	Ipoh
21:00 UTC+8	Shahrul 34', (yellow card) 60'; Hakim (yellow card) 45+3'; Ronaldo 69', 77'	Report	Dechi (yellow card) 12' (yellow-red card) 27'; Amirzafran (yellow card) 19'; Adib (yellow card) 56'; Khairu (yellow card) 86'; Thierry 88'	Stadium: Perak Stadium; Referee: Nazmi Nasaruddin

25 June 2019 18	Felda United	2–3	Perak	Jengka
21:00 UTC+8	Haziq (yellow card) 39'; Hadin 81'; Kei Ikeda 83'; Jasazrin (yellow card) 85'	Report	Ronaldo 22'; Kenny (yellow card) 27'; Partiban 34'; Hakim (yellow card) 39'; Careca 53', (yellow card) 90'	Stadium: Tun Abdul Razak Stadium; Referee: Hamdan Bin Awang

6 July 2019 19	Perak	0–3	Johor Darul Ta'zim	Ipoh
21:00 UTC+8	Gan (yellow card) 77'	Report	Velázquez 37', 48'; Adam (yellow card) 54'; Akhyar 90+3'	Stadium: Perak Stadium; Referee: Suhaizi Shukri

10 July 2019 20	Perak	3–2	Selangor	Ipoh
21:00 UTC+8	Careca 43', 63'; Leandro 45+3' (pen.), (yellow card) 78'	Report	Regan (yellow card) 11', (goal) 29'; Halim (yellow card) 11'; Endrick 45'	Stadium: Perak Stadium; Referee: Suhaizi Shukri

13 July 2019 21	Kedah	4–2	Perak	Kuantan
21:00 UTC+8	Thanabalan 40', (yellow card) 59'; Renan 45'; Alif (yellow card) 49'; Baddrol (yellow card) 51'; Shakir (yellow card) 79'; Fernando Rodríguez 89', 90+4'	Report	Shahrul 29'; Firdaus (yellow card) 33'; Careca (yellow card) 49'; Ronaldo 79' (pen.)	Stadium: Darul Aman Stadium; Referee: Razlan Joffri Ali

21 July 2019 22	Perak	2–1	Kuala Lumpur	Ipoh
21:00 UTC+8	Careca 32', 68'; Leandro (yellow card) 45+2'; Ronaldo (yellow card) 90+4'	Report	Woodland 77'; Indra Putra (yellow card) 83'; Zhafri (yellow card) 87'	Stadium: Perak Stadium; Referee: Suhaizi Shukri

=== AFC Champions League ===
==== Qualifying play-offs ====
12 February 2019	Perak (Malaysia)	1–1 (a.e.t.) (6–5 p)	(Hong Kong) Kitchee	Ipoh, Malaysia
21:00 UTC+8	Wander 14'; Firdaus (yellow card) 50'; Gilmar (yellow card) 107'; Partiban (yellow card) 120+2'	Report	Smith (yellow card) 41' (yellow-red card) 48'; Law Tsz Chun (yellow card) 71'; Li Ngai Hoi 86'; Wang Zhenpeng (yellow card) 89'	Stadium: Perak Stadium; Attendance: 8,605; Referee: Hanna Hattab (Syria)
	Penalties
	Wander (penalty scored); Amirul (penalty scored); Partiban (penalty scored); Leandro (penalty missed); Gilmar (penalty scored); Shahrul (penalty scored); Kenny (penalty scored)		Tarrés (penalty scored); Silva (penalty scored); Vadócz (penalty scored); Hélio (penalty scored); Li Ngai Hoi (penalty missed); Tong Kin Man (penalty scored); Cancela (penalty missed)

19 February 2019	Ulsan Hyundai (South Korea)	5–1	(Malaysia) Perak	Ulsan, South Korea
19:30 UTC+9	Amirul 23' (o.g.); Diskerud 56', 58'; Hong Joon-ho 70'; Kim Tae-hwan (yellow card) 78'; Júnior 87'	Report	Anderson (yellow card) 40'; Gilmar (yellow card) 46'; Kenny (yellow card) 47'; Nazirul 90'	Stadium: Ulsan Munsu Football Stadium; Attendance: 2,178; Referee: Abdulrahman Al-Jassim (Qatar)

=== Malaysia FA Cup ===
3 April 2019 Second round	Perak	2–1	Negeri Sembilan	Ipoh
21:00 UTC+8	Nazirul 40'; Kenny (yellow card) 45+1'; Amirul (yellow card) 66'; Shahrel 78', (yellow card) 78'	Report	Almir (yellow card) 43', (goal) 67'; Matheus Vila (yellow card) 80'	Stadium: Perak Stadium; Referee: Mohd Zan Mat Aris

17 April 2019 Third round	Jerantut	1–2	Perak	Jengka
21:00 UTC+8	Ilham (yellow card) 40'; Firdaus 45+3'; Azrul (yellow card) 90+4'	Report	Nazirul (yellow card) 45+1'; Wander Luiz 75', 85'	Stadium: Tun Abdul Razak Stadium; Referee: Zamzaidi Katimin

30 April 2019 Quarter-finals first leg	PKNP	0–0	Perak	Manjung
21:00 UTC+8	Giancarlo (yellow card) 32'; Hafiz (yellow card) 60'	Report	Shahrul (yellow card) 31'; Gilmar (yellow card) 65'	Stadium: Manjung Municipal Council Stadium; Referee: Wan Mohamad Tarmizi Wan Ibrahim

11 May 2019 Quarter-finals second leg	Perak	2–1 (2–1 agg.)	PKNP	Ipoh
22:00 UTC+8	Ronaldo 23', 88', (yellow card) 89'	Report	Hafiz (yellow card) 9'; Faizzzwan (yellow card) 17'; Pinto (yellow card) 27'; Ezanie (yellow card) 36'; Giancarlo 72', (yellow card) 81'	Stadium: Perak Stadium; Referee: Fitri Maskon

22 June 2019 Semi-finals first leg	Pahang	3–1	Perak	Kuantan
21:00 UTC+8	Goulon 12', 90+3'; Sumareh 39'; Safuwan (yellow card) 73'	Report	Eldor (yellow card) 15'; Partiban 55'; Nazirul (yellow card) 57'; Ronaldo (yellow card) 76'	Stadium: Darul Makmur Stadium; Referee: Zulkarnain Zakaria

29 June 2019 Semi-finals second leg	Perak	3–0 (4–3 agg.)	Pahang	Ipoh
21:00 UTC+8	Rafiuddin (yellow card) 32'; Gan 35'; Partiban 42'; Faisal 44' (o.g.); Leandro (yellow card) 69'; Kenny (yellow card) 90+2'	Report	Nwakaeme (yellow card) 29'; Safuwan (yellow card) 33'	Stadium: Perak Stadium; Referee: Fitri Maskon

27 July 2019 Final	Perak	0–1 (a.e.t.)	Kedah	Bukit Jalil
21:00 UTC+8	Nazirul (yellow card) 14'; Leandro (yellow card) 27'; Amirul (yellow card) 45' (yellow-red card) 90+4'	Report	Baddrol (yellow card) 13'; Bauman (yellow card) 60'; Danel 105+1'	Stadium: Bukit Jalil National Stadium; Referee: Takuto Okabe

=== Malaysia Cup ===
==== Group stage ====
Pos	Team	Pld	W	D	L	GF	GA	GD	Pts	Qualification
1	Pahang	6	5	0	1	12	5	+7	15	Advance to knockout stage
2	Perak	6	2	3	1	9	7	+2	9	Advance to knockout stage
3	Penang	6	1	2	3	5	10	−5	5	
4	Sabah	6	1	1	4	5	9	−4	4	

Source: FAM MFL

4 August 2019 1	Perak	3–0	Sabah	Ipoh
21:00 UTC+8	Eldor (yellow card) 26'; Leandro (yellow card) 37', (goal) 90+3'; Gan 45'; Careca 51'; Hafizul (yellow card) 86'	Report	Randy (yellow card) 24'; Paunović (yellow card) 40'; Maxius (yellow card) 70'	Stadium: Perak Stadium; Referee: Suhaimi Mat Hassan

== Statistics ==
=== Appearances and goals ===
No.	Pos.	Name	Malaysia Super League		Malaysia FA Cup		Malaysia Cup		AFC Champions League		Total	
No.	Pos.	Name	Apps	Goals	Apps	Goals	Apps	Goals	Apps	Goals	Apps	Goals
1	GK	(Malaysia) Nasrullah Aziz	0	0	0	0	0	0	0	0	0	0
3	DF	(Malaysia) Shahrul Saad	21	3	7	0	1	0	2	0	31	3
4	MF	(Malaysia) Nasir Basharudin	0(6)	0	1(2)	0	0	0	0	0	1(8)	0
5	DF	(Lebanon) Hussein Eldor	6	0	3	0	1	0	0	0	10	0
7	MF	(Malaysia) Khairil Anuar	0(11)	0	0(1)	0	0	0	0(2)	0	0(14)	0
8	MF	(Brazil) Leandro	17	2	7	0	1	1	2	0	27	3
9	FW	(Brazil) Ronaldo	10	6	3	2	1	0	0	0	14	8
10	MF	(Malaysia) Shahrel Fikri	8(8)	1	4(2)	1	0(1)	0	0	0	12(11)	2
11	MF	(Malaysia) Brendan Gan	14(2)	4	5	1	1	1	1	0	21(2)	6
12	MF	(Malaysia) Kenny Pallraj	9(4)	0	1(2)	0	0(1)	0	1(1)	0	11(8)	0
14	MF	(Malaysia) Firdaus Saiyadi	14(6)	0	1(5)	0	0(1)	0	2	0	17(12)	0
15	DF	(Malaysia) Idris Ahmad	14(1)	0	3(1)	0	1	0	1	0	19(2)	0
16	MF	(Malaysia) Partiban Janasekaran	9(10)	3	4(2)	2	1	0	0(2)	0	14(14)	5
17	DF	(Malaysia) Rizal Che Aziz	0	0	0	0	0	0	0	0	0	0
18	GK	(Malaysia) Khairul Amri	4	0	0	0	0	0	0	0	4	0
19	FW	(Malaysia) Hakim Hassan	21	2	7	0	1	0	2	0	31	2
20	DF	(Malaysia) Rafiuddin Roddin	3(8)	0	2(3)	0	0	0	1	0	6(11)	0
21	DF	(Malaysia) Nazirul Naim	19(1)	1	5	1	1	0	1	1	26(1)	3
22	GK	(Malaysia) Hafizul Hakim	18	0	7	0	1	0	2	0	28	0
23	DF	(Malaysia) Amirul Azhan	15(1)	0	4(1)	0	0	0	2	0	21(2)	0
24	DF	(Malaysia) Shathiya Kandasamy	0	0	0	0	0	0	0	0	0	0
26	FW	(Malaysia) Hamizul Izaidi	0(1)	0	0(1)	0	0	0	0	0	0(2)	0
30	FW	(Brazil) Careca	10	7	4	0	1	1	0	0	15	8
Players who left the club permanently or on loan during the season
2	DF	(Malaysia) Syazwan Zaipol	0(2)	0	0	0	0	0	0	0	0(2)	0
6	DF	(Australia) Zac Anderson	10	0	4	0	0	0	1	0	15	0
9	FW	(Brazil) Gilmar	8	4	2	0	0	0	2	0	12	4
10	MF	(Brazil) Wander Luiz	12(1)	2	3	2	0	0	2	1	17(1)	5
28	DF	(Malaysia) Nazirul Afif	0	0	0	0	0	0	0	0	0	0
30	DF	(Malaysia) Izzat Ramlee	0	0	0	0	0	0	0	0	0	0

Last updated: 4 August 2019.
Source: Perak TBG F.C.

=== Summary ===
Competition	P	W	D	L	GF	GA	CS	Booked	(yellow card) (yellow-red card)	Sent off (straight red)
Malaysia Super League	22	8	9	5	36	31	5	48	1	0
Malaysia FA Cup	7	4	1	2	10	7	2	17	1	0
Malaysia Cup	1	1	0	0	3	0	1	3	0	0
AFC Champions League	2	1	0	1	2	6	0	6	0	0
Total	32	14	10	8	51	44	8	74	2	0

Last updated: 4 August 2019.
Source: Perak TBG F.C.
