= 2019 Kelantan FA season =

Kelantan
2019 season
- President: Bibi Ramjani Ilias (until 18 June 2019); Wan Abdul Rahim (began 6 July 2019)
- Head coach: Marko Kraljević (until 8 April 2019); Yusri Che Lah (began 8 April 2019)
- Stadium: Sultan Muhammad IV Stadium
- Malaysia Premier League: 10th
- Malaysia FA Cup: Second round
- Malaysia Challenge Cup: Group stage
- Top goalscorer: League: Nik Akif (5); All: Nik Akif (5)
- Highest home attendance: 0
- Lowest home attendance: 0
- Average home league attendance: 0
Home colours	Away colours	Third colours
- All statistics correct as of 17 November 2021.

The 2019 season was Kelantan's 74th year in their history and 1st season in the Malaysia Premier League following relegation 2018 season. Along with the league, the club also participated in Malaysia FA Cup and Malaysia Challenge Cup.

== Events ==
=== Pre-season ===
On 15 January 2019, Flávio signed a one-year contract with the club after his contract with Negeri Sembilan expired.

On 23 January 2019, Mustafa Zazai signed with the club after his contract with Phrae United expired.

On 27 January 2019, Marko Kraljević signed a two-year contract with the club as the new head coach. On 27 January 2019, Raúl Tarragona signed a contract with the club.

On 28 January 2019, David Rowley joined the club on one-year contract.

=== During season ===
On 1 April 2019, Raúl Tarragona left the club by mutual agreement.

On 8 April 2019, Marko Kraljević has been sacked from the club after three months with the club. Cássio, Flávio, Mustafa Zazai and Raúl Tarragona have left the club during mid season.

On 24 April 2019, Mustafa Zazai decided to leave the club.

On 14 May 2019, Flávio left the club to join Liga 1 club Bhayangkara.

On 16 May 2019, Badhri Radzi left the club by mutual agreement.

On 18 June 2019, Kelantan Football Association President, Bibi Ramjani has resigned.

== Competitions ==
=== Malaysia Premier League ===
Pos	Team	Pld	W	D	L	GF	GA	GD	Pts	Qualification or relegation
8	UKM	20	6	4	10	28	32	−4	22	
9	Selangor United	20	6	3	11	24	37	−13	21	
10	Kelantan	20	4	8	8	23	32	−9	17 (Note: Kelantan have been docked three points following the club’s failure to comply with FIFA’s decision over claims made by former technical director Alfredo Carlos Gonzalez.)	
11	Sarawak (R)	20	4	4	12	25	44	−19	16	Qualification to relegation play-off
12	Perlis (Note: Perlis were disqualified on 20 February 2019.)	0	0	0	0	0	0	0	0	Disqualified

Source: MFL
Rules for classification: 1) Points; 2) Goal difference; 3) Number of goals scored.
(R) Relegated
Notes:

2 February 2019 1	Selangor United	1–0	Kelantan

8 February 2019 2	Kelantan	3–3	Sabah

17 February 2019 3	UKM	0–1	Kelantan

2 March 2019 4	Johor Darul Ta'zim II	2–0	Kelantan

8 March 2019 5	UiTM	3–3	Kelantan

29 March 2019 6	Kelantan	1–1	Terengganu II

6 April 2019 7	Sarawak	1–1	Kelantan

12 April 2019 8	Kelantan	0–1	PDRM

18 April 2019 9	Negeri Sembilan	3–1	Kelantan

26 April 2019 10	Kelantan	2–1	Penang

4 May 2019 11	Kelantan	0–0	Sarawak

11 May 2019 12	Penang	4–1	Kelantan

20 May 2019 13	Kelantan	2–5	Negeri Sembilan

25 May 2019 14	Terengganu II	2–2	Kelantan

16 June 2019 15	Kelantan	0–0	UiTM

18 June 2019 16	Kelantan	1–1	Johor Darul Ta'zim II

5 July 2019 17	Kelantan	2–0	Selangor United

10 July 2019 18	PDRM	3–1	Kelantan

13 July 2019 19	Sabah	1–0	Kelantan

20 July 2019 20	Kelantan	2–0	UKM

=== Malaysia FA Cup ===
2 April 2019 Second round	Kelantan	0–3	Selangor

=== Malaysia Challenge Cup ===
==== Group stage ====
Pos	Team	Pld	W	D	L	GF	GA	GD	Pts	Qualification	JDT2	SAR	KEL
1	Johor Darul Ta'zim II	4	3	1	0	7	2	+5	10	Advance to Semi-finals	—	3–1	3–1
2	Sarawak	4	1	1	2	3	6	−3	4	Advance to Semi-finals	0–0	—	0–3
3	Kelantan	4	1	0	3	4	6	−2	3		0–1	0–2	—

Source: Malaysian Football League

14 August 2019 1	Kelantan	0–1	Johor Darul Ta'zim II

20 August 2019 2	Sarawak	0–3	Kelantan

27 August 2019 3	Kelantan	0–2	Sarawak

6 September 2019 4	Johor Darul Ta'zim II	3–1	Kelantan

== Statistics ==
=== Appearances and goals ===
As of match played 6 September 2019

No.	Pos	Nat	Player	Total		League		FA Cup		Challenge Cup	
No.	Pos	Nat	Player	Apps	Goals	Apps	Goals	Apps	Goals	Apps	Goals
3	DF	(Malaysia) MAS	Afiq Azuan	13	0	10+1	0	0	0	2	0
5	DF	(Malaysia) MAS	Shahrul Nizam	23	0	18	0	1	0	4	0
6	DF	(Malaysia) MAS	Farisham Ismail (Captain)	24	0	19	0	1	0	4	0
11	MF	(Malaysia) MAS	Nik Akif	19	5	14	5	1	0	4	0
12	MF	(Malaysia) MAS	Hakimi Abdullah	19	1	9+8	1	1	0	0+1	0
13	DF	(Malaysia) MAS	Azwan Aripin	20	2	16	2	1	0	2+1	0
15	DF	(Malaysia) MAS	Khairul Asyraf	17	0	10+4	0	0	0	2+1	0
17	FW	(Malaysia) MAS	Khairul Rizam	13	1	4+4	0	1	0	3+1	1
18	DF	(Malaysia) MAS	Syaiful Alias	6	0	1+2	0	0	0	2+1	0
19	FW	(Malaysia) MAS	Fauzi Roslan	20	4	9+6	1	0+1	0	2+2	3
20	MF	(Malaysia) MAS	Danial Haqim	21	2	16	2	1	0	4	0
21	FW	(Malaysia) MAS	Zul Fahmi Awang	4	0	1+3	0	0	0	0	0
22	GK	(Malaysia) MAS	Saufi Muhammad	0	0	0	0	0	0	0	0
24	DF	(Malaysia) MAS	Amsyar Rosli	0	0	0	0	0	0	0	0
26	MF	(Malaysia) MAS	Nik Azli	18	4	9+5	4	0	0	4	0
27	MF	(Malaysia) MAS	Danial Ashraf	14	0	5+7	0	0	0	0+2	0
28	MF	(Malaysia) MAS	Amirul Shafik	14	1	5+5	1	0	0	1+3	0
29	FW	(Malaysia) MAS	Imran Samso	13	1	6+3	1	0	0	4	0
30	GK	(Malaysia) MAS	Arif Abdullah	12	0	12	0	0	0	0	0
32	FW	(Malaysia) MAS	Juzaerul Jasmi	1	0	0	0	0+1	0	0	0
36	DF	(Malaysia) MAS	Nashran Elias	2	0	2	0	0	0	0	0
38	GK	(Malaysia) MAS	Fikri Che Soh	8	0	4	0	0	0	4	0
51	FW	(France) FRA	L´Imam Seydi	7	0	6	0	0	0	1	0
Player(s) who left the club but had featured this season
1	GK	(Malaysia) MAS	Muhammad Nor Amin	0	0	0	0	0	0	0	0
4	DF	(Brazil) BRA	Cássio	6	0	5+1	0	0	0	0	0
7	MF	(Brazil) BRA	Flávio	11	4	10	4	1	0	0	0
8	MF	(Malaysia) MAS	David Rowley	9	0	8+1	0	0	0	0	0
10	MF	(Afghanistan) AFG	Mustafa Zazai	10	1	9	1	1	0	0	0
14	FW	(Uruguay) URU	Raúl Tarragona	5	1	5	1	0	0	0	0
16	MF	(Malaysia) MAS	Badhri Radzi	3	0	0+2	0	0+1	0	0	0
23	FW	(Malaysia) MAS	Afiq Saluddin	6	0	2+2	0	1	0	1	0
25	DF	(Malaysia) MAS	Ridhwan Deraman	0	0	0	0	0	0	0	0
33	GK	(Malaysia) MAS	Damien Lim	6	0	4+1	0	1	0	0	0
