= Shakir Shaari =

Malaysian association football player and manager

Personal information
- Full name: Mohammad Shakir bin Shaari
- Date of birth: 29 September 1986 (age 40)
- Place of birth: Kota Bharu, Kelantan, Malaysia
- Height: 1.72 m (5 ft 8 in)
- Position: Defensive midfielder

Youth career
- 2004: Kelantan

Senior career*
Years	Team	Apps	(Gls)
2005–2006	MPPJ	?	(0)
2006–2009	UPB-MyTeam	?	(0)
2010–2013	Kelantan	91	(1)
2014–2017	Johor Darul Ta'zim	35	(0)
2018–2019	Johor Darul Ta'zim II	38	(0)

International career
2006–2007	Malaysia U-23		
2011–2013	Malaysia	11	(0)

Managerial career
- 2019–: Johor Darul Ta'zim II (assistant)
- * Club domestic league appearances and goals

Mohammad Shakir bin Shaari (born 29 September 1986) is a former Malaysian professional football player and football coach.

He played as a defensive midfielder for Johor Darul Ta'zim II in Malaysia Premier League.

== Early life ==
Shakir was born in Kota Bharu, Kelantan. He is the eighth child of eleven siblings. His interest in football existed only when he plays on the field around the village when he was a kid. In 1998, he was chosen to represent Kelantan at MSSM Championship Football Under 12 Years. Shakir journey of life continues to shine when selected into the Sekolah Sukan Tengku Mahkota Ismail (SSTMI) (formerly known as Sekolah Sukan Bandar Penawar), Kota Tinggi. Throughout those schools, Shakir has also represented Malaysia Sports School (combined schools sports) at the Nike Cup Under 15 Years in Bangkok in 2001 before continuing his studies from in Bukit Jalil Sports School (SSBJ) a year later.

== Club career ==
Shakir started his career with Kelantan President Cup Team in 2004 at the age of 18. In 2005, he joins MPPJ FC for a season and then left the club cause of the financial problems. After that, he signs a contract with MyTeam which competed in the Malaysia Super League in 2006. In 2009, the club was withdraw from Malaysia Super League cause of the financial problems. After seeing his potential to be a great midfielder, Kelantan's coach Peter James Butler brought him into the team. He was officially joins Kelantan in 2010. He also was the part of the Kelantan's 2010 Malaysia Cup winning team, 2011 Malaysia Super League champions, and 2012 Malaysia FA Cup winner.

== International career ==
Shakir made his international debut against Myanmar on 18 June 2011 and helped his team win by 2–0. He also was called up by Malaysia coach, Datuk K. Rajagobal for friendly matches against Philippines and Singapore in June 2012. Shakir was called up for the 2012 AFF Suzuki Cup.

== Personal life ==
On 9 December 2010, Shakir had married with Nurul Fatiha Abd Hamid, former national artistic gymnastics athletes who working as television presenter for RTM. They have a son after two years of their marriage.

== Career statistics ==
=== Club ===
As of 12 October 2019

Appearances and goals by club, season and competition
Club	Season	League			National cup		League cup		Others		Total	
Club	Season	Division	Apps	Goals	Apps	Goals	Apps	Goals	Apps	Goals	Apps	Goals
MPPJ FC	2005	Malaysia Super League		0		0		0	–			0
MPPJ FC	2005–06	Malaysia Super League		0		0		0	–		2	0
MPPJ FC	Total			0		0		0	–			0
MyTeam	2006–07	Malaysia Premier League	16	0	2	0	–				18	0
MyTeam	2007–08	Malaysia Super League		0		0		0	–			0
MyTeam	2009	Malaysia Super League		0		0		0	–			0
MyTeam	Total			0		0		0	–			0
Kelantan	2010	Malaysia Super League	24	0	2	0	11	0	–		37	0
Kelantan	2011	Malaysia Super League	25	1	6	1	7	1	–		38	3
Kelantan	2012	Malaysia Super League	23	0	6	0	11	0	9 (Note: 2012 AFC Cup)	0	49	0
Kelantan	2013	Malaysia Super League	19	0	6	0	11	0	6 (Note: 2013 AFC Cup)	0	42	0
Kelantan	Total		91	1	20	1	40	1	15	0	166	3
Johor Darul Ta'zim	2014	Malaysia Super League	19	0	3	0	10	0	–		32	0
Johor Darul Ta'zim	2015	Malaysia Super League	8	0	0	0	2	0	6 (Note: 2015 AFC Cup & 2015 AFC Champions League qualifying round)	0	16	0
Johor Darul Ta'zim	2016	Malaysia Super League	2	0	0	0	4	0	3 (Note: 2016 AFC Cup)	1	9	1
Johor Darul Ta'zim	2017	Malaysia Super League	6	0	1	0	1	0	4 (Note: 2017 AFC Cup)	0	12	0
Johor Darul Ta'zim	Total		35	0	4	0	17	0	13	1	69	1
Johor Darul Ta'zim II	2018	Malaysia Premier League	18	0	–		–		7 (Note: 2018 Malaysia Challenge Cup)	0	25	0
Johor Darul Ta'zim II	2019	Malaysia Premier League	20	0	–		–		8 (Note: 2019 Malaysia Challenge Cup)	0	28	0
Johor Darul Ta'zim II	Total		38	0	–		–		15	0	53	0
Career total												

=== International ===
Malaysia national team
Year	Apps	Goals
2011	2	0
2012	7	0
2013	2	0
Total	11	0

International appearances and goals
#	Date	Venue	Opponent	Result	Goal	Competition
2011
1.	18 June	Kota Bharu, Malaysia	Myanmar	2–0 (W)	0	Friendly
2.	29 June	Bukit Jalil, Malaysia	Chinese Taipei	2–1 (W)	0	2014 FIFA World Cup qualification
2012
3.	12 June	Shah Alam, Malaysia	Singapore	2–0 (W)	0	Friendly
4.	3 November	Hanoi, Vietnam	Vietnam	1–0 (L)	0	Friendly
5.	7 November	Nonthaburi, Thailand	Thailand	2–0 (L)	0	Friendly
6.	14 November	Shah Alam, Malaysia	Hong Kong	1–1 (D)	0	Friendly
7.	20 November	Bukit Jalil, Malaysia	Bangladesh	1–1 (D)	0	Friendly
8.	28 November	Bukit Jalil, Malaysia	Laos	4–1 (W)	0	2012 AFF Suzuki Cup
9.	1 December	Bukit Jalil, Malaysia	Indonesia	2–0 (W)	0	2012 AFF Suzuki Cup
2013
10.	6 February	Jassim Bin Hamad Stadium, Qatar	Qatar	0–2 (L)	0	2015 AFC Asian Cup qualification
11.	10 September	Tianjin Olympic Center Stadium, China	China	0–2 (L)	0	Friendly

== Honours ==
Kelantan

- Malaysia Super League: 2011, 2012; Runner-up 2010
- Malaysia Cup: 2010, 2012; Runner-up 2013
- Malaysia FA Cup: 2012; Runner-up 2011
- Malaysia Charity Shield: 2011; Runner-up 2012

Johor Darul Takzim

- Malaysia Super League: 2014, 2015, 2016, 2017
- Malaysia Cup Runner-up: 2014, Champion: 2017
- Malaysia FA Cup: 2016
- Malaysian Charity Shield: 2015, 2016
- AFC Cup: 2015

Johor Darul Takzim II

- Malaysia Challenge Cup: 2019
