= 2019 Malaysia Challenge Cup group stage =

The 2019 Malaysia Challenge Cup group stage featured 7 teams. The teams were drawn into groups of four and another with three teams, and played each other home-and-away in a round-robin format. The top two teams in each group advanced to the semi-finals.

The group stage will start on 5 August 2019 and concludes on 12 September 2019.

== Groups ==
=== Group A ===
Pos	Team	Pld	W	D	L	GF	GA	GD	Pts	Qualification
1	Johor Darul Ta'zim II	4	3	1	0	7	2	+5	10	Advance to Semi-finals
2	Sarawak	4	1	1	2	3	6	−3	4	Advance to Semi-finals
3	Kelantan	4	1	0	3	4	6	−2	3	

Source: Malaysian Football League

5 August 2019
21:00 UTC+8

Johor Darul Ta'zim II	3–1	Sarawak
Fernandes 26'; Rozaimi 45+1'; Ghaddar 59'	Report	Azizi Ramlee 6'

Pasir Gudang Corporation Stadium
14 August 2019
21:00 UTC+8

Kelantan	0–1	Johor Darul Ta'zim II
	Report	Ghaddar 32'

Sultan Muhammad IV Stadium
20 August 2019
20:15 UTC+8

Sarawak	0–3	Kelantan
	Report	Fauzan 35', 89'; Rizam 46'

Sarawak State Stadium

27 August 2019
21:00 UTC+8

Kelantan	0–2	Sarawak
	Report	Hudson 22'; Zahrul Nizwan 54'

Sultan Muhammad IV Stadium
6 September 2019
21:00 UTC+8

Johor Darul Ta'zim II	3–1	Kelantan
Ghaddar 7'; Ramadhan Saifullah 25'; Kumaahran 50'		Fauzan 73'

Pasir Gudang Corporation Stadium
12 September 2019
21:00 UTC+8

Sarawak	0–0	Johor Darul Ta'zim II

Sarawak State Stadium

=== Group B ===
Pos	Team	Pld	W	D	L	GF	GA	GD	Pts	Qualification
1	UKM	6	3	3	0	12	6	+6	12	Advance to Semi-finals
2	Terengganu II	6	3	2	1	11	8	+3	11	Advance to Semi-finals
3	Kuala Lumpur	6	2	0	4	6	9	−3	6	
4	Selangor United	6	1	1	4	5	11	−6	4	

Source: Malaysian Football League
6 August 2019
21:00 UTC+8

Terengganu II	2–1	Kuala Lumpur
Bruno 43', 63'	Report	Paulo 90'

Sultan Ismail Nasiruddin Shah Stadium
6 August 2019
21:00 UTC+8

UKM	3–1	Selangor United
Milad 14'; Wan Afiq 40'; Roskam 49'	Report	Nurshamil 48'

KLFA Stadium

14 August 2019
21:00 UTC+8

Terengganu II	2–2	UKM
Bruno 22' (pen.); Marcel 31'	Report	Milad 56'; Faiz Hanif 88'

Sultan Ismail Nasiruddin Shah Stadium
15 August 2019
21:00 UTC+8

Kuala Lumpur	3–1	Selangor United
Paulo 13', 39', 90+2'	Report	Nurshamil 79'

KLFA Stadium

20 August 2019
21:00 UTC+8

UKM	3–0	Kuala Lumpur
Roskam 35'; Wan Faiz 64'; Sobri 90'

KLFA Stadium
21 August 2019
16:45 UTC+8

Selangor United	2–3	Terengganu II
Eizul Asyraf 21'; Nurshamil 42'		Ashari 17', 20'; Bruno 84'

Selayang Stadium

28 August 2019
21:00 UTC+8

Kuala Lumpur	1–2	UKM
Nah Haeng-seok 36'		Milad 45+1'; Wan Faiz 72'

KLFA Stadium
28 August 2019
21:00 UTC+8

Terengganu II	2–0	Selangor United
Sunday 75'; Bruno Suzuki 90+1'

Sultan Ismail Nasiruddin Shah Stadium

6 September 2019
16:45 UTC+8

Selangor United	1–0	Kuala Lumpur
Rafiq Shah 67'

Selayang Stadium
7 September 2019
21:00 UTC+8

UKM	2–2	Terengganu II
Hafizi Amiruddin 22'; Roskam 45+7' (pen.)		Zulasyraf Zulkefli 47'; Rizduan Razali 87'

KLFA Stadium

12 September 2019
21:00 UTC+8

Selangor United	0–0	UKM

Selayang Stadium
12 September 2019
21:00 UTC+8

Kuala Lumpur	1–0	Terengganu II
Syafwan Syahlan 16'

KLFA Stadium
