= Azizan =

Azizan is both a Malaysian masculine given name and surname. Notable people with the name include:

== Given name ==
- Azizan Zainul Abidin (1935–2004), Malaysian civil servant
- Azizan Ariffin (born 1952), Malaysian general
- Mohd Azizan Baba (1981–2022), Malaysian footballer
- Azhar Azizan Harun (born 1962), Malaysian politician and lawyer
- Raphi Azizan Mariappen (born 1996), Malaysian footballer
- Azizan Abdul Razak (1944–2013), Malaysian politician
- Azizan Saperi (born 1989), Malaysian footballer

== Surname ==
- Amir Hamzah Azizan (born 1967), Malaysian businessman and politician
- Mohammad Azmir Azizan (born 1980), Malaysian politician and school administrator
- Syed Ismail Syed Azizan (born 1954), Malaysian police officer
