= Ronaldo (footballer, born 1991) =

Brazilian footballer

Personal information
- Full name: Ronaldo Henrique Silva
- Date of birth: 10 April 1991 (age 35)
- Place of birth: São Bernardo do Campo, Brazil
- Height: 1.85 m (6 ft 1 in)
- Position: Forward

Team information
- Current team: Amazonas
- Number: 9

Senior career*
Years	Team	Apps	(Gls)
2009–2011	Portuguesa	20	(0)
2012	Guarani	37	(7)
2013	Joinville	33	(11)
2014	Yokohama FC	12	(1)
2015–2018	Ituano	34	(5)
2015	→ Botafogo (loan)	6	(1)
2016	→ Fortaleza (loan)	5	(0)
2017	→ Botafogo-SP (loan)	8	(2)
2018	→ São Bento (loan)	27	(2)
2019	XV de Piracicaba	16	(6)
2019	Perak FA	10	(6)
2020	Santo André	10	(5)
2020	Sport Recife	6	(2)
2020–2021	Avaí	22	(0)
2022	Inter de Limeira	11	(9)
2022–2023	Novorizontino	64	(22)
2024	Operário	33	(3)
2025	Ferroviária	33	(4)
2026–	Amazonas	15	(4)
- * Club domestic league appearances and goals as of 10 November 2026

Ronaldo Henrique Silva (born 10 April 1991), simply known as Ronaldo, is a Brazilian professional footballer who plays as a forward for Amazonas.

== Playing career ==
=== Yokohama FC ===
Ronaldo played for J2 League club Yokohama FC in the 2014 season.

=== Perak FA ===
Ronaldo played for Malaysia Super League club Perak FA in the 2019 season. He scored 2 goals in his debut against PKNP FC in the 2019 Malaysia FA Cup Quarterfinal 2nd Leg. Perak won the game 2–1. Three days later, he scored again in his first game in the league against the same team, PKNP FC. The match ended 3–1 in favour of Perak.

== Career statistics ==
As of 29 September 2019.

Appearances and goals by club, season and competition
Club	Season	League			National Cup		League Cup		Total	
Club	Season	Division	Apps	Goals	Apps	Goals	Apps	Goals	Apps	Goals
Yokohama FC	2014	J2 League	12	1	0	0	–		12	1
Perak	2019	Malaysia Super League	10	6	3	2	8	3	21	11
Career total			22	7	3	2	8	3	33	12
