= Nam Se-in =

South Korean footballer

Nam Se-in 남세인
Personal information
- Date of birth: 15 January 1993 (age 33)
- Place of birth: South Korea
- Height: 1.67 m (5 ft 5 1/2 in)
- Position: Midfielder

Team information
- Current team: UKM
- Number: 26

Youth career
- Dong-eui University

Senior career*
Years	Team	Apps	(Gls)
2014	Daegu	0	(0)
2016–2017	Académico de Viseu	1	(0)
2017	→ Mirandela (loan)	12	(5)
2018–	UKM	17	(7)
- * Club domestic league appearances and goals as of 13 July 2018

Nam Se-in (Korean: 남세인; born 15 January 1993) is a South Korean football player who plays for Malaysia Premier League club UKM as an attacking midfielder.

== Club career ==
He made his professional debut in the Segunda Liga for Académico de Viseu on 23 November 2016 in a game against Penafiel.
