= Arif Anwar =

Malaysian professional footballer

Personal information
- Full name: Muhammad Arif bin Mohamed Anwar
- Date of birth: March 14, 1995 (age 31)
- Place of birth: Gombak, Malaysia
- Height: 1.71 m (5 ft 7 in)
- Position: Forward

Team information
- Current team: PDRM
- Number: 20

Youth career
- –2014: Harimau Muda

Senior career*
Years	Team	Apps	(Gls)
2015	Harimau Muda B	14	(3)
2016–2017	Kuala Lumpur City	15	(1)
2018	Petaling Jaya Rangers	6	(2)
2019	Kuala Lumpur City	11	(0)
2020	UiTM FC	8	(1)
2021–2022	Terengganu	13	(0)
2023–	PDRM	7	(0)

International career^{‡}
2016–2018	Malaysia U-23	1	(0)
- * Club domestic league appearances and goals as of May 9, 2021 ‡ National team caps and goals as of December 17, 2017

Muhammad Arif bin Mohamed Anwar (born 14 March 1995) is a Malaysian professional footballer who plays as a forward for Malaysia Super League club PDRM.

== Club career ==
=== Petaling Jaya Rangers ===
On 20 November 2017, Arif signed a contract with Petaling Jaya Rangers.

== Career statistics ==
=== Club ===
As of match played 29 August 2021

Appearances and goals by club, season and competition.
Club performance			League		Cup		League Cup (Note: Includes Singapore Cup and Malaysia Cup)		Continental		Total	
Season	Club	League	Apps	Goals	Apps	Goals	Apps	Goals	Apps	Goals	Apps	Goals
2015	Harimau Muda B	S.League	14	3	0	0	0	0	–		14	3
Total			14	3	0	0	0	0	0	0	14	3
2016	Kuala Lumpur	Malaysia Premier League	11	1	2	0	2	0	–		15	1
2017	Kuala Lumpur	Malaysia Premier League	4	0	1	0	0	0	–		5	0
Total			15	1	3	0	2	0	0	0	20	1
2018	Petaling Jaya Rangers	Malaysia FAM League	6	2	2	1	–				8	3
Total			6	2	2	1	0	0	0	0	8	3
2019	Kuala Lumpur	Malaysia Super League	11	0	3	0	–				14	0
Total			11	0	3	0	0	0	0	0	14	0
2020	UiTM	Malaysia Super League	8	1	0	0	–				8	1
Total			8	1	0	0	0	0	0	0	8	1
2021	Terengganu	Malaysia Super League	7	0	0	0	–				7	0
Total			7	0	0	0	0	0	0	0	7	0
Career total			0	0	0	0	0	0	0	0	0	0

== Honours ==
=== Kuala Lumpur ===
- Malaysia Premier League
  - Champion(1): 2017
