= Hong Joon-ho =

South Korean footballer (born 1993)

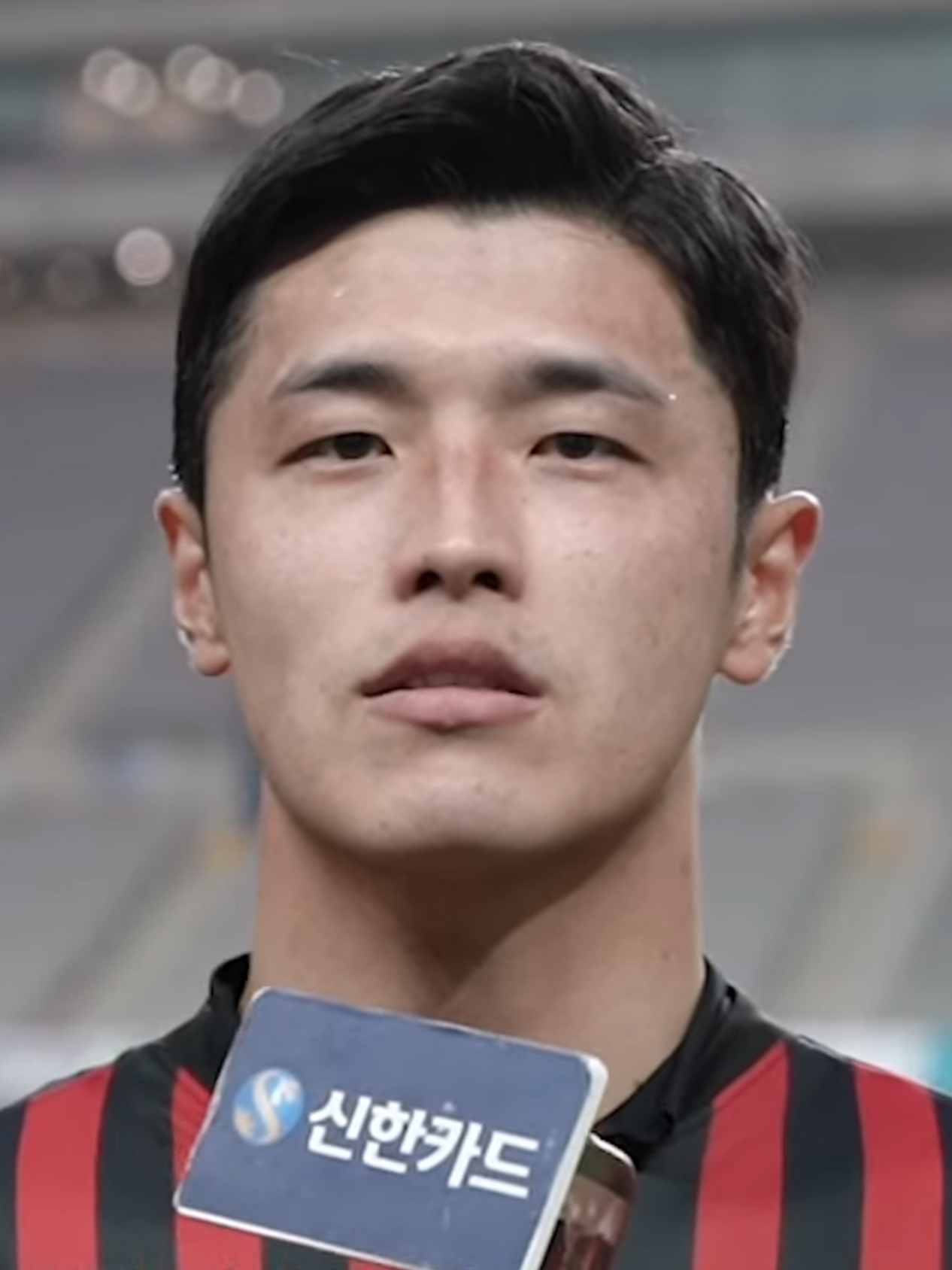
- Hong in March 2021

Personal information
- Date of birth: 11 October 1993 (age 33)
- Place of birth: Jeju Province, South Korea
- Height: 1.92 m (6 ft 3 1/2 in)
- Position: Centre back

Team information
- Current team: Jeju SK
- Number: 15

Youth career
- 2012–2015: Jeonju University

Senior career*
Years	Team	Apps	(Gls)
2016–2020	Gwangju FC	90	(2)
2018	→ Ulsan Hyundai (loan)	2	(0)
2021	FC Seoul	18	(0)
2021–	Jeju SK	31	(1)
2022	→ Yangpyeong FC (loan)	16	(1)
2023	→ Dangjin Citizen FC (loan)	14	(1)
2025	→ Chungbuk Cheongju (loan)	21	(1)
- * Club domestic league appearances and goals as of 7 January 2026

Hong Joon-ho (Korean: 홍준호; born 11 October 1993) is a South Korean footballer who plays as centre back for Jeju SK in K League 1. He joined K League 1 side Gwangju FC in January 2016. Then he joined K League 1 side FC Seoul in February 2021.
