= Ryutaro Karube =

Japanese footballer

Personal information
- Date of birth: 19 December 1992 (age 33)
- Place of birth: Tokyo, Japan
- Height: 1.88 m (6 ft 2 in)
- Position: Defensive midfielder

Youth career
- Kawasaki Frontale

Senior career*
Years	Team	Apps	(Gls)
2015–2016	Gifu	24	(2)
2017–2018	Perseru Serui	14	(6)
2018	Dong A Thanh Hoa	5	(0)
2018	Chainat Hornbill	11	(0)
2018–2019	Kuala Lumpur City	12	(0)
2019	Chainat Hornbill	12	(1)
2019–2020	Suphanburi	7	(0)
2021	Saigon	0	(0)
- * Club domestic league appearances and goals as of 3 October 2020

Ryutaro Karube (苅部 隆太郎, Karube Ryutaro; born 19 December 1992) is a Japanese footballer who plays as a defensive midfielder.

== Statistics ==
=== Club ===
Updated to 23 February 2016.

Club performance			League		Cup		Total	
Season	Club	League	Apps	Goals	Apps	Goals	Apps	Goals
Japan			League		Emperor's Cup		Total	
2015	Gifu	J2 League	7	0	0	0	7	0
2016	Gifu	J2 League	17	2	0	0	17	2
Total			24	2	0	0	24	2
