= Luke Woodland =

Professional footballer (born 1995)

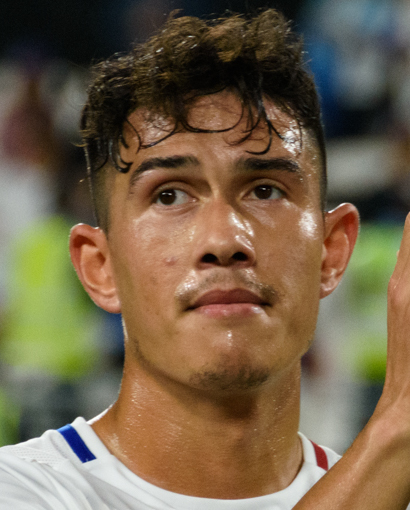
- Woodland playing for Philippines at the 2019 AFC Asian Cup

Personal information
- Full name: Luke Zantua Woodland
- Date of birth: 21 July 1995 (age 31)
- Place of birth: Abu Dhabi, United Arab Emirates
- Height: 1.83 m (6 ft 0 in)
- Position: Defender

Youth career
- 2003–2013: Bolton Wanderers

Senior career*
Years	Team	Apps	(Gls)
2013–2015	Bolton Wanderers	0	(0)
2015	→ Oldham Athletic (loan)	6	(0)
2015	Chester	1	(0)
2016	Bradford Park Avenue	7	(0)
2016	Oldham Athletic	1	(0)
2016–2017	York City	2	(0)
2017	Ceres–Negros	16	(0)
2018–2019	Buriram United	0	(0)
2018	→ Suphanburi (loan)	2	(0)
2019	Kuala Lumpur	16	(2)
2019–2021	Ratchaburi Mitr Phol	27	(1)
2022–2023	Terengganu	1	(0)

International career^{‡}
2010	England U16	1	(0)
2011–2012	England U17	9	(0)
2012	England U18	1	(0)
2015–2021	Philippines	23	(0)
- * Club domestic league appearances and goals as of 22 April 2022 ‡ National team caps and goals as of 12 June 2021

Luke Zantua Woodland (born 21 July 1995) is a former professional footballer who played as a defender. Born in the United Arab Emirates, he represented the Philippines national team.

Woodland started his career with Bolton Wanderers. He represented England at under-16, under-17 and under-18 levels and played for the Philippines from 2015 to 2021.

== Early and personal life ==
Woodland was born in Abu Dhabi in the United Arab Emirates to an English father and a Filipino mother. Both of his parents worked in the Persian Gulf country. The family moved to Liverpool in England when Woodland was two years old.

== Club career ==
=== Bolton Wanderers ===
Woodland joined Bolton Wanderers in their youth system at the age of eight. He progressed through the ranks, earning Player of the Year on two occasions. Woodland was given a football scholarship aged 15 and a two-year professional contract at 17 years old in April 2013.

=== Oldham Athletic ===
Woodland joined League One club Oldham Athletic on 13 March 2015 on a one-month loan. He made his debut the following day, playing the whole match in a 3–1 home defeat against Barnsley. His fourth appearance for Oldham, at home to Rochdale on 24 March 2015, saw him earn the man of the match award. After extending his loan spell until the end of the 2014–15 season, the club was interested in signing permanently.

After his loan spell at Oldham came to an end, Woodland was released by Bolton, ending his 12-year association with the club. After leaving Bolton, Woodland went on trial at Major League Soccer team New York Red Bulls.

=== Chester and Bradford Park Avenue ===
Woodland signed for National League club Chester on 30 October 2015 on non-contract terms. Woodland made his debut on 21 November 2015, coming on as a 75th-minute substitute for John Rooney in the 75th minute of a 2–1 home loss against Woking. After making one appearance, Woodland was released by the club in December 2015.

On 25 March 2016, Woodland signed for National League North club Bradford Park Avenue. Woodland made his debut in a 3–0 away loss against Boston United on 9 April 2016 and went on to make seven appearances for the club.

=== Return to Oldham Athletic and York City ===
Woodland re-joined Oldham Athletic for the second time on 11 July 2016, signing a six-month contract until December. He made his debut on 20 August 2016 as an 87th-minute substitute in a 1–0 away win over Bury.

Woodland was permitted to play for the reserve team of National League club York City, playing in a 3–0 victory at home to Mansfield Town. His release from Oldham was announced on 25 November 2016, and on the same say he signed for York on a contract until January 2017. Woodland made his debut the following day, starting their 3–0 away defeat to Bromley. However, he was dropped after this match, although manager Gary Mills affirmed that Woodland was still in his plans, saying: "Some people judge players on their first game, but I know Luke's a good player". On 5 January 2017, he extended his contract until the end of 2016–17. Having made three appearances, Woodland left York by mutual consent on 7 February 2017.

=== Ceres–Negros ===
Woodland signed for Philippines Football League club Ceres–Negros in February 2017. He left the club after deciding to not renew his contract after the 2017 season.

=== Buriram and loan to Suphanburi ===
He moved to Thailand in June 2018 signing up for Buriram United. However he was loaned to Thai League 1 club Suphanburi. While with Suphanburi, Woodland was involved in an altercation between himself and a Thai player while in a training session which caused him to loss favor with the club's non-English speaker coach. Sustaining injuries after playing in the 2020 AFF Championship with the Philippine national team, Woodland returned to Buriram and took part in training to regain his form. He went on to play in the 2019 AFC Asian Cup but failed to earn a break in Buriram.

=== Kuala Lumpur ===
Woodland signed for Malaysia Super League club Kuala Lumpur on 18 February 2019. They dropped injured defender Achmad Jufriyanto in place of Woodland.

=== Ratchaburi ===
After his stint with Kuala Lumpur, Woodland returned to Thailand to play for Ratchaburi and played 16 league games for the club in the 2020–2021 season.

== International career ==
Woodland was eligible to play for England and the Philippines owing to his heritage, and the UAE for being born there. Between 2010 and 2012, Woodland was selected for England at youth level, playing 11 matches for the under-16, under-17 and under-18 teams.

In March 2015, the Philippine Football Federation invited him to join the Philippines national team training camp. However, he did not attend due to club commitments. Two months later, he was named in the Philippines' 23-man squad for their 2018 FIFA World Cup qualifiers against Bahrain and Yemen on 11 and 16 June respectively. Woodland missed the match against Bahrain due to delays in gaining international clearance, but made his debut against Yemen on 16 June 2015.

== Career statistics ==
=== Club ===
As of 22 April 2022

Appearances and goals by club, season and competition
Club	Season	League			National Cup (Note: Includes Singapore Cup)		League Cup		Other		Total	
Club	Season	Division	Apps	Goals	Apps	Goals	Apps	Goals	Apps	Goals	Apps	Goals
Bolton Wanderers	2013–14	Championship	0	0	0	0	0	0	—		0	0
Bolton Wanderers	2014–15	Championship	0	0	0	0	0	0	—		0	0
Bolton Wanderers	Total		0	0	0	0	0	0	—		0	0
Oldham Athletic (loan)	2014–15	League One	6	0	—		—		—		6	0
Chester	2015–16	National League	1	0	—		—		1 (Note: Appearance in Cheshire Senior Cup)	0	2	0
Bradford Park Avenue	2015–16	National League North	7	0	—		—		—		7	0
Oldham Athletic	2016–17	League One	1	0	0	0	0	0	1 (Note: Appearance in EFL Trophy)	0	2	0
York City	2016–17	National League	2	0	—		—		1 (Note: Appearance in FA Trophy)	0	3	0
Ceres–Negros	2017	Philippines Football League	16	0	1	0	—		5 (Note: Appearances in AFC Cup)	0	22	0
Buriram United	2018	Thai League 1	0	0	0	0	0	0	—		0	0
Suphanburi (loan)	2018	Thai League 1	2	0	0	0	0	0	—		2	0
Kuala Lumpur	2019	Malaysia Super League	16	2	3	0	0	0	—		19	2
Ratchaburi Mitr Phol	2020	Thai League 1	16	0	0	0	0	0	—		16	0
Ratchaburi Mitr Phol	2021–22	Thai League 1	11	1	0	0	0	0	—		11	1
Ratchaburi Mitr Phol	Total		27	1	0	0	0	0	—		27	1
Terengganu	2022	Malaysia Super League	1	0	0	0	0	0	—		1	0
Terengganu	2023	Malaysia Super League	0	0	0	0	0	0	—		0	0
Career total			79	3	4	0	0	0	8	0	91	3

=== International ===
As of match played 11 June 2021

Appearances and goals by national team and year
National team	Year	Apps	Goals
Philippines	2015	3	0
Philippines	2016	4	0
Philippines	2017	4	0
Philippines	2018	3	0
Philippines	2019	7	0
Philippines	2021	2	0
Total		23	0
