= 2018 Malaysia Challenge Cup =

Piala Cabaran 2018

Tournament details
- Country: Malaysia
- Date: 7 August – 15 October 2018
- Teams: 8

Final positions
- Champions: Terengganu II (1st title)
- Runners-up: UKM

Tournament statistics
- Matches played: 30
- Goals scored: 77 (2.57 per match)
- Top goal scorer(s): (Nigeria) Michael Ijezie (13 goals)
- All statistics correct as of 15 October 2018.

The 2018 Malaysia Challenge Cup or Challenge Cup (Malay: Piala Cabaran Malaysia 2018) is the first edition of Malaysia Challenge Cup tournament organised by Football Association of Malaysia (FAM) and Football Malaysia LLP (FMLLP).

The 2018 Malaysia Challenge Cup will start with a preliminary round. A total of 8 teams took part in the competition. The teams were divided into two groups, each containing four teams. The group leaders and runners-up teams in the groups after six matches qualified to the semi-finals.

== Format ==
The competition will be one involving eight teams-one team from Malaysia Super League (12th placed team), seven teams from Malaysia Premier League (6th to 12th placed teams). However, because Kuantan were thrown out of the league, another team will be invited into the Challenge Cup to replace them.

== Round and draw dates ==
The draw for the 2018 Malaysia Challenge Cup was held on 1 August 2018.

Phase	Round	Draw date	First leg	Second leg
Group stage	Matchday 1	1 August 2018; 15:30 UTC+8	7–8 August 2018	
Group stage	Matchday 2	1 August 2018; 15:30 UTC+8	14–15 August 2018	
Group stage	Matchday 3	1 August 2018; 15:30 UTC+8	28–29 August 2018	
Group stage	Matchday 4	1 August 2018; 15:30 UTC+8	4–5 September 2018	
Group stage	Matchday 5	1 August 2018; 15:30 UTC+8	11–12 September 2018	
Group stage	Matchday 6	1 August 2018; 15:30 UTC+8	18–19 September 2018	
Knockout stage	Semi-finals	1 August 2018; 15:30 UTC+8	24 September 2018	1 October 2018
Knockout stage	Final	1 August 2018; 15:30 UTC+8	8 October 2018	15 October 2018

== Group stage ==
=== Group A ===
Pos	Team	Pld	W	D	L	GF	GA	GD	Pts	Qualification	TER	UKM	NSE	SAR
1	Terengganu II	6	3	3	0	10	6	+4	12	Advance to Semi-finals	—	3–3	1–1	1–0
2	UKM	6	3	1	2	14	10	+4	10	Advance to Semi-finals	1–3	—	2–1	5–1
3	Negeri Sembilan	6	3	1	2	9	6	+3	10		0–1	2–1	—	3–1
4	Sarawak	6	0	1	5	3	14	−11	1		1–1	0–2	0–2	—

Updated to match(es) played on 17 September 2018. Source: FAM FMLLP

=== Group B ===
Pos	Team	Pld	W	D	L	GF	GA	GD	Pts	Qualification	JDT	ATM	UiTM	PEN
1	Johor Darul Ta'zim II	6	4	1	1	15	4	+11	13	Advance to Semi-finals	—	2–0	0–0	4–0
2	ATM	6	3	1	2	5	5	0	10	Advance to Semi-finals	2–1	—	1–0	0–0
3	UiTM	6	1	2	3	4	6	−2	5		2–3	2–0	—	0–0
4	Penang	6	1	2	3	3	11	−8	5		1–5	0–2	2–0	—

Updated to match(es) played on 18 September 2018. Source: FAM FMLLP

== Knockout stage ==
=== Bracket ===
Semi-finals
A2	UKM	1	1	2
B1	Johor Darul Ta'zim II	1	0	1
B2	ATM	0	0	0
A1	Terengganu II	2	3	5

Finals
UKM	2	0	2
Terengganu II	2	2	4

=== Semifinals ===
Team 1	Agg.	Team 2	1st leg	2nd leg
UKM	2-1	Johor Darul Ta'zim II	1−1	1-0
ATM	0-5	Terengganu II	0−2	0-3

=== Semi-finals ===
First Leg

24 September 2018
20:15 UTC+8

UKM	1−1	Johor Darul Ta'zim II
Michael Ijezie 82' (pen.)		S. Kumaahran 12'

KLFA Stadium, Kuala Lumpur
Referee: Tuan Mohd Yassin

Second Leg

1 October 2018
20:15 UTC+8

Johor Darul Ta'zim II	0-1	UKM
		Faiz Hanif 52'

Pasir Gudang Stadium, Pasir Gudang

UKM won 2−1 on aggregate.

First Leg

24 September 2018
20:15 UTC+8

ATM	0−2	Terengganu II
		Andrew Jean-Baptiste 5'; Bruno Suzuki 9'

Selayang Stadium, Selayang

Second Leg

1 October 2018
20:15 UTC+8

Terengganu II	3−0	ATM
Zuasyraf Zulkiefle 15'; Akanni-Sunday Wasiu 27' 83' (pen.)

Sultan Ismail Nasiruddin Shah Stadium, Kuala Terengganu

Terengganu II won 5−0 on aggregate.

=== Final ===
The first legs will be played on 8 October 2018, and the second legs will be played on 15 October 2018

8 October 2018
20:15 UTC+8

UKM	2−2	Terengganu II

Shah Alam Stadium, Shah Alam
15 October 2018
20:15 UTC+8

Terengganu II	2−0	UKM
Akanni-Sunday Wasiu 22', 53'

Sultan Ismail Nasiruddin Shah Stadium, Kuala Terengganu

Terengganu II won 4−2 on aggregate.

== Statistics ==
=== Top scorers ===
As of matches played on 15 October 2018

Rank	Player	Club	Goals
1	(Nigeria) Michael Ijezie	UKM	13
2	(Nigeria) Akanni Sunday	Terengganu II	8
3	(Argentina) Nicholas Fernàndez	Johor Darul Ta'zim II	3
3	(Japan) Bruno Suzuki	Terengganu II	3
5	(Malaysia) Amirul Hadi	Johor Darul Ta'zim II	2
5	(Malaysia) D. Saarvindran	Johor Darul Ta'zim II	2
5	(Malaysia) S. Kumaahran	Johor Darul Ta'zim II	2
5	(Malaysia) Faizal Abu Bakar	Negeri Sembilan	2
5	(Malaysia) Fakrul Aiman Sidid	Negeri Sembilan	2
5	(Brazil) Flavio Beck	Negeri Sembilan	2
5	(Malaysia) Dzulazlan Ibrahim	Sarawak	2
5	(Malaysia) Haidhir Suhaini	Terengganu II	2
5	(Malaysia) Faiz Hanif	UKM	2

=== Hat-tricks ===
Player	For	Against	Result	Date
(Nigeria) Michael Ijezie^{5}	UKM	Sarawak	5–1	7 August 2018

^{5} Player scored five goals

=== Clean sheets ===
As of matches played on 15 October 2018

Rank	Player	Club	Clean sheets
1	(Malaysia) Shamirza Yusoff	Terengganu II	4
2	(Malaysia) Hafizuddin Azuhar	ATM	3
2	(Malaysia) Haziq Nadzli	Johor Darul Ta'zim II	3
2	(Malaysia) Azam Jais	UiTM	3
5	(Malaysia) Al- Hafiz Hamzah	Penang	2
5	(Malaysia) Haziq Aris	UKM	2
7	(Malaysia) Ernest Wong	Johor Darul Ta'zim II	1
7	(Malaysia) Saiful Amar Sudar	Negeri Sembilan	1
7	(Malaysia) Hazrul Hafiz	Penang	1
7	(Malaysia) Suhaimi Husin	Terengganu II	1

== See also ==
- 2018 Malaysia Premier League
- 2018 Malaysia FAM Cup
- 2018 Malaysia FA Cup
- 2018 Malaysia Cup
- 2018 Piala Presiden
- 2018 Piala Belia
