= 2019 Malaysia Challenge Cup =

Piala Cabaran 2019

Tournament details
- Country: Malaysia
- Date: 5 August – 12 October 2019
- Teams: 7

Final positions
- Champions: Johor Darul Ta'zim II (1st title)
- Runner-up: UKM

Tournament statistics
- Matches played: 24
- Goals scored: 64 (2.67 per match)
- Top goal scorer(s): (Japan) Bruno Suzuki (Croatia) Mateo Roskam (Iran) Milad Zanidpour (6 goals)

Awards
- Best player: (Malaysia) Khatul Anuar
- All statistics correct as of 12 October 2019.

The 2019 Malaysia Challenge Cup or Challenge Cup (Malay: Piala Cabaran Malaysia 2019) is the second edition of Malaysia Challenge Cup tournament organised by Football Association of Malaysia (FAM) and Malaysian Football League (MFL).

The 2019 Malaysia Challenge Cup will start with a preliminary round. A total of 7 teams took part in the competition. The teams were divided into two groups, one group containing four teams and another with three teams. The group leaders and runners-up teams in the groups after four or six matches qualified to the semi-finals.

== Format ==
The competition will be one involving eight teams-one team from Malaysia Super League (12th placed team), seven teams from Malaysia Premier League (6th to 12th placed teams). However, because Perlis were thrown out of the league, there are no teams will be invited into the Challenge Cup to replace them.

== Round and draw dates ==
The draw for the 2019 Malaysia Challenge Cup was held on 23 July 2019.

Phase	Round	Draw date	First leg	Second leg
Group stage	Matchday 1	23 July 2019; 15:30 UTC+8	5–6 August 2019	
Group stage	Matchday 2	23 July 2019; 15:30 UTC+8	14–15 August 2019	
Group stage	Matchday 3	23 July 2019; 15:30 UTC+8	20–21 August 2019	
Group stage	Matchday 4	23 July 2019; 15:30 UTC+8	27–28 August 2019	
Group stage	Matchday 5	23 July 2019; 15:30 UTC+8	6–7 September 2019	
Group stage	Matchday 6	23 July 2019; 15:30 UTC+8	12 September 2019	
Knockout stage	Semi-finals	23 July 2019; 15:30 UTC+8	20–21 September 2019	27–28 September 2019
Knockout stage	Final	23 July 2019; 15:30 UTC+8	4 October 2019	12 October 2019

== Group stage ==
=== Group A ===
Pos	Team	Pld	W	D	L	GF	GA	GD	Pts	Qualification	JDT2	SAR	KEL
1	Johor Darul Ta'zim II	4	3	1	0	7	2	+5	10	Advance to Semi-finals	—	3–1	3–1
2	Sarawak	4	1	1	2	3	6	−3	4	Advance to Semi-finals	0–0	—	0–3
3	Kelantan	4	1	0	3	4	6	−2	3		0–1	0–2	—

Source: Malaysian Football League

=== Group B ===
Pos	Team	Pld	W	D	L	GF	GA	GD	Pts	Qualification	UKM	TER	KLU	SEU
1	UKM	6	3	3	0	12	6	+6	12	Advance to Semi-finals	—	2–2	3–0	3–1
2	Terengganu II	6	3	2	1	11	8	+3	11	Advance to Semi-finals	2–2	—	2–1	2–0
3	Kuala Lumpur	6	2	0	4	6	9	−3	6		1–2	1–0	—	3–1
4	Selangor United	6	1	1	4	5	11	−6	4		0–0	2–3	1–0	—

Source: Malaysian Football League

== Knockout stage ==
=== Bracket ===
Semi-finals
B2	Terengganu II	1	1	2
A1	Johor Darul Ta'zim II	2	2	4
A2	Sarawak	0	1	1
B1	UKM	1	6	7

Finals
Johor Darul Ta'zim II	1	0	1 (6)
UKM	0	1	1 (5)

=== Semifinals ===
Team 1	Agg.	Team 2	1st leg	2nd leg
Terengganu II	2–4	Johor Darul Ta'zim II	1−2	1−2
Sarawak	1–7	UKM	0−1	1−6

=== Semi-finals ===
First Leg

20 September 2019
21:00 UTC+8

Terengganu II	1−2	Johor Darul Ta'zim II
Bruno 60'		Lok 65'; Kumaahran 83'

Sultan Ismail Nasiruddin Shah Stadium

Second Leg

27 September 2019
21:00 UTC+8

Johor Darul Ta'zim II	2−1	Terengganu II
Fernandez 53'; Rozaimi 66'		Marcel 76'

Pasir Gudang Corporation Stadium

Johor Darul Ta'zim II won 4−2 on aggregate.

First Leg

22 September 2019
20:15 UTC+8

Sarawak	0−1	UKM
		Milad 80'

Sarawak State Stadium

Second Leg

28 September 2019
21:00 UTC+8

UKM	6−1	Sarawak
Hafizi Amiruddin 5', 7'; Roskam 23', 31'; Milad 49', 73'		Aliff Hasaan 37'

KLFA Stadium

UKM won 7−1 on aggregate.

=== Final ===
The first legs will be played on 4 October 2019, and the second legs will be played on 12 October 2019

Team 1	Agg.	Team 2	1st leg	2nd leg
Johor Darul Ta'zim II	1–1	UKM	1−0	1−0

4 October 2019
21:00 UTC+8

Johor Darul Ta'zim II	1−0	UKM
Amirul 64'

Pasir Gudang Corporation Stadium
12 October 2019
21:00 UTC+8

UKM	1−0	Johor Darul Ta'zim II
Mateo Roskam 82'

KLFA Stadium

1−1 on aggregate. Johor Darul Ta'zim II won 6−5 on penalty after extra time.

== Statistics ==
=== Top scorers ===
As of matches played on 12 October 2019

Rank	Player	Club	Goals
1	(Japan) Bruno Suzuki	Terengganu II	6
1	(Croatia) Mateo Roskam	UKM	6
1	(Iran) Milad Zanidpour	UKM	6
4	(Brazil) Paulo Josué	Kuala Lumpur	4
5	(Malaysia) Fauzi Roslan	Kelantan	3
5	(Malaysia) Hafizi Amirudin	UKM	3
5	(Malaysia) Nurshamil Abd Ghani	Selangor United	3
5	(Lebanon) Mohamad Ghaddar	Johor Darul Ta'zim II	3

=== Hat-tricks ===
Player	For	Against	Result	Date
(Brazil) Paulo Josué	Kuala Lumpur	Selangor United	3–1	15 August 2019

=== Clean sheets ===
As of matches played on 4 October 2019

Rank	Player	Club	Clean sheets
1	(Malaysia) Haziq Nadzli	Johor Darul Ta'zim II	3
1	(Malaysia) Khatul Anuar	UKM	3
3	(Malaysia) Damien Lim	Selangor United	2
3	(Malaysia) Saiful Wazizi	Sarawak	2
5	(Malaysia) Fikri Che Soh	Kelantan	1
5	(Malaysia) Shamirza Yusoff	Terengganu II	1

== See also ==
- 2019 Malaysia FA Cup
- 2019 Malaysia Cup
