= MFL Challenge Cup =

Malaysian football tournament

- Founded: August 2018; 8 years ago
- Region: Malaysia
- Teams: 8
- Current champions: Sabah (1st title)
- Most championships: Terengganu II; Johor Darul Ta'zim II; PDRM; Selangor; Sabah (1 title each)
- Broadcaster: Astro Arena
- Website: www.footballmalaysia.com
- 2026 MFL Challenge Cup

The MFL Challenge Cup (Malay: Piala Cabaran MFL), previously referred to as the Malaysia Challenge Cup, is a football tournament in Malaysia that is organized jointly by the Malaysian Football League (MFL) and the Football Association of Malaysia (FAM). The tournament serves as a secondary-tier cup competition for teams that are eliminated during the round of 16 of the Malaysia Cup.

== History ==
The tournament was created for the Malaysia Super League and the Malaysia Premier League teams that did not qualify for the Malaysia Cup tournament through their league standings. The idea was mooted by the Football Malaysia in December 2017 as a solution to increase the number of competitive games. The inaugural tournament was held in 2018, with eight teams divided into 2 groups of four and playing a double round-robin system. The winners and runners-up of each group qualify to the knockout stage. The tournament is held concurrently with the Malaysia Cup, with Challenge Cup games mostly played in midweek.

== Competition format ==
=== Selection of teams ===
For the 2018 edition, the team that finished last in the Malaysia Super League, and the sixth-placed to twelfth-placed teams in the Malaysia Premier League qualified for the tournament. From 2020 until 2023 it was not held due to COVID-19 pandemic. The FAM announced its return in 2023, featuring 8 teams eliminated in the last 16 of the 2023 Malaysia Cup.

=== Knockout stage ===
From the quarterfinals to the final stage of the competition, the matches are conducted in a two-legged format, with each team playing one match at home and another away.

== Results ==
=== List of finals ===
Season	Home team	Score	Away team	Venue	Attendance	Ref
2018	UKM FC	2–2	Terengganu II	Shah Alam Stadium, Shah Alam	1,485	
2018	Terengganu II	2–0	UKM FC	Sultan Ismail Nasiruddin Shah Stadium, Kuala Terengganu	3,800	
2018	Terengganu II won 4–2 on aggregate					
2019	Johor Darul Ta'zim II	1–0	UKM FC	Pasir Gudang Corporation Stadium, Pasir Gudang	4,830	
2019	UKM FC	1–0	Johor Darul Ta'zim II	Kuala Lumpur Stadium, Cheras	1,778	
2019	Aggregate 1–1, Johor Darul Ta'zim II won 6–5 on penalties					
2023	PDRM	3–0	Kuching City	Petaling Jaya Stadium, Petaling Jaya	955	
2023	Kuching City	1–1	PDRM	Sarawak State Stadium, Kuching	2,000	
2023	PDRM won 4–1 on aggregate					
2024–25	Selangor	3–0; Awarded (Note: Disciplinary Committee of the Football Association of Malaysia (FAM) awarded Selangor a 3–0 win as a result of PDRM fielding the ineligible player Safiee Ahmad, after Selangor had defeated PDRM by 3–2. Safiee Ahmad failed to serve an automatic one match suspension for receiving two yellow cards earlier in the quarter-finals first leg match against Melaka and the semi-finals second leg match against Kedah Darul Aman.)	PDRM	Petaling Jaya Stadium, Petaling Jaya	3,768	
2024–25	PDRM	0–4	Selangor	Petaling Jaya Stadium, Petaling Jaya	2,232	
2024–25	Selangor won 7–0 on aggregate					
2026	Penang	1–1	Sabah	City Stadium, George Town	8,984	
2026	Sabah	0–0	Penang	Likas Stadium, Kota Kinabalu	20,589	
2026	Aggregate 1–1, Sabah won 4–3 on penalties					

== Performance by team ==
The table shown performances by the six teams who reached the final stage of the MFL Challenge Cup.

Team	Winners	Runners-up	Seasons won	Seasons runners-up
PDRM	1	1	2023	2024–25
Sabah	1	0	2026	
Selangor	1	0	2024–25	—
Johor Darul Ta'zim II	1	0	2019	—
Terengganu II	1	0	2018	—
UKM FC	0	2	—	2018, 2019
Penang	0	1	—	2026
Kuching City	0	1	—	2023

== Records and statistics ==
=== Final ===
- Most titles: 1
  - Terengganu II (2018)
  - Johor Darul Ta'zim II (2019)
  - PDRM (2023)
  - Sabah (2026)
  - Selangor (2024–25)
- Most appearances in final: 2
  - UKM FC (2018, 2019)
  - PDRM (2023, 2024–25)
- Most defeats in final: 2, UKM FC (2018, 2019)
- Biggest win in final: PDRM 0–4 Selangor (2024–25)
- Most goals in final: 4
  - UKM FC 2–2 Terengganu II (2018)
  - PDRM 0–4 Selangor in the second leg (2024–25)

== Winning coaches ==
Season	Coach	Team
2018	(Malaysia) Mustaffa Kamal	Terengganu II
2019	(Croatia) Ervin Boban	Johor Darul Ta'zim II
2023	(Malaysia) Yunus Alif	PDRM
2024–25	(Japan) Katsuhito Kinoshi	Selangor
2026	(Spain) Juan Torres Garrido	Sabah

== Top goalscorers ==
Season	Player	Team	Goals
2018	(Nigeria) Michael Chukwubunna Ijezie	UKM FC	13
2019	(Japan) Bruno Suzuki	Terengganu II	6
2019	(Croatia) Mateo Roskam	UKM FC	6
2019	(Iran) Milad Zanidpour	UKM FC	6
2023	(Nigeria) Uche Agba	PDRM	5
2024–25	(Chile) Ronnie Fernández	Selangor	4

== Awards ==
=== Player of the tournament ===
Officially known as MASKargo Player of the tournament for sponsorship reasons, it is awarded to the overall best player of the season.

Season	Player	Team
2024–25	(Chile) Ronnie Fernández	Selangor

== See also ==
- Malaysia FA Cup
- MFL Cup
- Piala Emas Raja-Raja
- Football in Malaysia
