= Rizal Che Aziz =

Malaysian footballer (born 1996)

Personal information
- Full name: Muhammad Rizal bin Che Aziz
- Date of birth: 1 January 1996 (age 30)
- Place of birth: Terengganu, Malaysia
- Height: 1.67 m (5 ft 6 in)
- Position: Defender

Team information
- Current team: Perak
- Number: 17

Youth career
- –2017: Perak

Senior career*
Years	Team	Apps	(Gls)
2018–	Perak	1	(0)
- * Club domestic league appearances and goals as of 2 February 2019

Muhammad Rizal bin Che Aziz (born 1 January 1996) is a Malaysian footballer who plays as a defender for Perak.
