= Raphi Azizan Mariappen =

Malaysian footballer (born 1996)

Personal information
- Full name: Mohamad Raphi Bin Azizan Mariappen
- Date of birth: 28 January 1996 (age 30)
- Place of birth: Kedah, Malaysia
- Height: 1.71 m (5 ft 7 1/2 in)
- Position: Defender

Team information
- Current team: KSR Sains
- Number: 19

Youth career
- 2012–2014: Harimau Muda

Senior career*
Years	Team	Apps	(Gls)
2015–2017	Kedah	5	(0)
2017–2018	Petaling Jaya Rangers	11	(0)
2019	Johor Darul Ta'zim II		(0)
2019	Kuala Lumpur		(0)
2020–	KSR Sains		(0)

International career^{‡}
2015–	Malaysia U23	1	(0)
- * Club domestic league appearances and goals as of 24 March 2020 ‡ National team caps and goals as of November 17, 2016

Mohamad Raphi Bin Azizan Mariappen (born 28 January 1996) is a Malaysian professional footballer who plays as a defender for Malaysian club KSR Sains.

== Club career ==
=== Petaling Jaya Rangers ===
On 5 May 2017, Raphi signed a contract with Petaling Jaya Rangers.

== Career statistics ==
As of 29 July 2018

Appearances and goals by club, season and competition.
Malaysia			League		FA Cup		Malaysia Cup		Asia		Total	
Season	Club	League	Apps	Goals	Apps	Goals	Apps	Goals	Apps	Goals	Apps	Goals
2015	Kedah	Malaysia Super League	5	0	0	0	0	0	–		5	0
2016	Kedah	Malaysia Super League	0	0	0	0	0	0	–		0	0
2017	Kedah	Malaysia Super League	0	0	0	0	0	0	–		0	0
Total			5	0	0	0	0	0	0	0	5	0
2017	Petaling Jaya Rangers	Malaysia FAM League	6	0	0	0	–				6	0
2018	Petaling Jaya Rangers	Malaysia FAM League	5	0	2	0	–				7	0
Career total			16	0	2	0	0	0	0	0	18	0

== Honours ==
- Malaysia Premier League
  - Runners-up(1) : 2015
