= Milad Zeneyedpour =

Iranian footballer

Milad Zanidpour
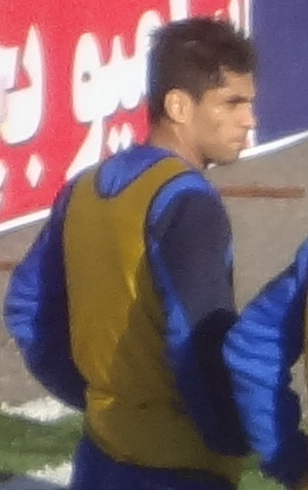
- Zeneyedpour in 2012

Personal information
- Full name: Milad Zeneyedpour
- Date of birth: 21 March 1986 (age 40)
- Place of birth: Ahvaz, Iran
- Height: 1.78 m (5 ft 10 in)
- Position: Left winger

Youth career
- 2003–2006: Foolad

Senior career*
Years	Team	Apps	(Gls)
2006–2007	Foolad	8	(0)
2007–2009	Saipa	30	(3)
2008–2009	→ Paykan (loan)	26	(2)
2009–2010	Rah Ahan	33	(10)
2010–2011	Steel Azin	30	(4)
2011–2012	Damash	27	(4)
2012	Sepahan	6	(0)
2012–2013	Paykan	9	(1)
2013	Zob Ahan	11	(0)
2013–2014	→ Malavan (loan)	3	(0)
2014–2015	Naft Masjed Soleyman	27	(0)
2015	Erbil	10	(2)
2016	Rah Ahan	15	(4)
2017	Army United	0	(0)
2017–2018	Gostaresh Foulad	15	(1)
2018	Madura United	13	(1)
2019	UKM	21	(7)
2020	Sarawak FA	11	(3)
2022–2023	Ilves-Kissat	45	(27)

International career^{‡}
2004–2006	Iran U20		
2006–2007	Iran U23		
2008–2012	Iran	16	(1)
- * Club domestic league appearances and goals as of 11 March 2024 ‡ National team caps and goals as of 14 February 2022

Milad Zeneyedpour (Persian: میلاد زنیدپور; born 21 March 1986) is an Iranian professional footballer who most recently played as a left winger for Kakkonen club Ilves-Kissat.

== Club career ==
Having played for the Iran national under-20 football team in India, he caught the attention of Saipa head coach Ali Daei and in 2007 he joined to Saipa. Since then the young starlet has managed to impose himself on to the starting line up where he has managed to develop a name for himself. He joined to Damash Gilan in summer 2011 and spent one season at the club. Then, he signed a three-years contract with Iran Pro League defending champion, Sepahan on 12 June 2012. Milad decided to leave Sepahan soon because he was not happy about his status in the new team, and agreed to separate from his team on mid-season of his first year with Sepahan. He joined Paykan on 17 December 2012 and signed on 1 January 2013 after his contract was terminated by Sepahan. After Paykan's relegation, he joined Malavan in summer 2013 but was loaned to Zob Ahan.

On 10 September 2015, Zeneyedpour joined Iraqi side Erbil.

== Career statistics ==
As of 10 January 2024

Club			League		Cup		Continental		Total	
Club	Season	League	Apps	Goals	Apps	Goals	Apps	Goals	Apps	Goals
Foolad	2005–06	Persian Gulf Pro League	2	0				0	2	0
Foolad	2006–07	Persian Gulf Pro League	6	0	1	0	—		7	0
Foolad	Total		8	0	1	0	0	0	9	0
Saipa	2007–08	Persian Gulf Pro League	30	3			8	1	38	4
Paykan (loan)	2008–09	Persian Gulf Pro League	26	2	0	0	—		26	2
Rah Ahan	2009–10	Persian Gulf Pro League	33	10			—		33	10
Steel Azin	2010–11	Persian Gulf Pro League	30	4	2	0	—		32	4
Damash	2011–12	Persian Gulf Pro League	27	4	3	1	—		30	5
Sepahan	2012–13	Persian Gulf Pro League	6	0	0	0	0	0	6	0
Paykan	2012–13	Persian Gulf Pro League	9	1	—				9	1
Zob Ahan	2013–14	Persian Gulf Pro League	11	0	1	0	—		12	0
Malavan (loan)	2013–14	Persian Gulf Pro League	3	0	0	0	—		3	0
Naft Masjed Soleyman	2014–15	Persian Gulf Pro League	27	0	0	0	—		27	0
Erbil	2015–16	Iraqi Premier League	10	2	1	0	0	0	11	2
Rah Ahan	2016–17	Azadegan League	15	4	0	0	—		15	4
Army United	2017	Thai League 2	0	0	1	0	—		1	0
Gostaresh Foulad	2017–18	Persian Gulf Pro League	15	1	0	0	—		15	1
Madura United	2018	Liga 1 Indonesia	13	1	—				13	1
UKM	2019	Malaysia Premier League	21	7					21	7
Sarawak FA	2020	Malaysia Premier League	11	3					11	3
Ilves-Kissat	2022	Kakkonen	25	15	2	0	–		27	15
Ilves-Kissat	2023	Kakkonen	20	12	1	1	–		21	13
Ilves-Kissat	Total		45	27	3	1	0	0	48	28
Career total			340	69	12	2	8	1	360	72

== International ==
Zanidpour represented Iran in India in Asian Football Confederation's under 20s championship as a left back. After the appointment of Ali Daei as the Team Melli coach Zanidpour got his first call up on 12 March 2008 the senior team.

=== International goals ===
Scores and results list Iran's goal tally first.

#	Date	Venue	Opponent	Score	Result	Competition
1	28 December 2009	, Doha	Qatar	1–2	2–3	Friendly

== Honours ==
- WAFF Championship
  - Winner (1): 2008
