= Zaiful Hakim =

Malaysian footballer

Personal information
- Full name: Zaiful bin Abdul Hakim
- Date of birth: 1 March 1993 (age 33)
- Place of birth: Selangor, Malaysia
- Height: 1.74 m (5 ft 9 in)
- Position: Left back

Team information
- Current team: Kuala Lumpur Rovers
- Number: 3

Youth career
- 2015–2016: Selangor
- 2016: → Kuala Lumpur (loan)

Senior career*
| Years | Team | Apps | (Gls) |
| 2016–2019 | Kuala Lumpur | 39 | (0) |
| 2020– | Kuala Lumpur Rovers | 2 | (0) |
- * Club domestic league appearances and goals as of 22 March 2020

Zaiful bin Abdul Hakim (born 1 March 1994) is a Malaysian footballer who plays for Malaysia M3 League side Kuala Lumpur Rovers as a left back.
