= Mateo Roskam =

Croatian footballer (born 1987)

Personal information
- Date of birth: 16 March 1987 (age 39)
- Place of birth: Split, SR Croatia, SFR Yugoslavia
- Height: 1.87 m (6 ft 1 1/2 in)
- Position: Forward

Youth career
- 2003–2005: Zmaj Makarska

Senior career*
Years	Team	Apps	(Gls)
2005–2007	NK Zagreb	12	(2)
2008–2010	Cultural Leonesa	46	(10)
2010–2013	Široki Brijeg	79	(13)
2013	Slaven Belupo	9	(0)
2014	Sime Darby	28	(9)
2015–2016	Tampines Rovers	30	(8)
2017–2018	Sarawak	37	(15)
2019	UKM	17	(4)
- * Club domestic league appearances and goals as of 26 June 2018

Mateo Roskam (born 16 March 1987) is a Croatian retired footballer who last played for UKM in the Malaysia Premier League as a forward. His father Jean-Jacques was a guitarist in rock group Galija.

== Career ==
=== Youth career ===
Hailing from Vrgorac, a town without a football club, Roskam went through the youth ranks of HNK Zmaj Makarska.

=== NK Zagreb ===
He later moved to Zagreb for his first senior season to join NK Zagreb.

=== Cultural y Deportiva Leonesa ===
Not getting a chance at Zagreb, he moved to Spain, joining the Segunda B side Cultural Leonesa, where he spent three seasons as a substitute.

=== NK Široki Brijeg ===
He moved to NK Široki Brijeg in 2010, establishing himself as a first team player.

=== NK Slaven Belupo ===
After three seasons at NK Široki Brijeg, in the summer of 2013, Rostam joined the Prva HNL side Slaven Belupo.

=== Sime Darby F.C. ===
In April 2014, he joined Sime Darby where he scored a hattrick against Kelantan in a 4–0 league win.

=== Tampines Rovers ===
After leaving Sime Darby, Roskam signed for S.League title contenders Tampines Rovers for the 2015 S.League Season. He scored his first competitive goal for Tampines in the second game of the season, earning his new side a 1–0 win against the Young Lions.

=== Sarawak ===
Mateo left Singapore and joined Sarawak for the 2017 Malaysia Super League season.
