= UKM F.C. =

Malaysian football club

UKM
- Full name: Universiti Kebangsaan Malaysia Football Club
- Nickname(s): The Varsity Boys
- Short name: UKMFC
- Founded: 2013; 12 years ago
- Ground: Kuala Lumpur Stadium
- Capacity: 18,000
- Owner: National University of Malaysia
- Chairman: Noor Azlan Ghazali

Universiti Kebangsaan Malaysia Football Club is a football club based in Bangi, Selangor, Malaysia. The club represents the National University of Malaysia.

== History ==
=== Early years ===
The club was founded in 2013. They have been competing in Malaysian Institutes of Higher Education Football League and has won several college football competitions. UKM who won the Minister of Higher Education Ministry Cup and runners-up of Division One University Football League in 2014, was automatically eligible to join the 2015 Malaysia FAM League. Their place in Minister of Higher Education Ministry League was taken over by the MMU, 2014 Minister of Higher Education Division Two University Football League champion.

In 2015, the club has been accepted by Football Association of Malaysia to compete in Malaysia FAM League, the third-tier of Malaysian football. The club also collaborated with Sime Darby to provide a youth players for the Sime Darby youth team which competed in Malaysia President's Cup.

=== 2015 season ===
After successfully bringing UKM to be the champion of the Minister of Higher Education Ministry Cup and the runner-up of the University Football League Division 1, Sulaiman Hussin moved to Sime Darby and joined the President's Cup squad coaching. Asnan Mohamad Zuki, who led University of Malaya to become the Minister of Higher Education Ministry Cup 2013 champion after beating UKM, was appointed as the UKM FC coach. On their first season in Malaysia FAM League, they finished in fourth place behind Perlis, Real Mulia and Megah Murni. Only one team from each league promoted into 2016 Malaysia Premier League, and Perlis became runners-up of Malaysia FAM League that season after lost into Melaka United.

UKM FC vice captain, Hafizuddin Sulaiman became top goalscorers of the club after scoring 8 goals - even he played as the defender.

=== 2016 season ===
UKM FC appointed Lim Kim Liang, ex Kuala Lumpur head coach and brought back Sulaiman Hussin as assistant head coach. They missed the spot into knock-out stage, as they finished fifth place. On this season, only top 4 of each league qualify into knock-out stage, and two teams into the finals automatically qualify into Malaysia Premier League.

UKM FC also qualified into Malaysia FA Cup for the first time. In the first round, they defeated Hanelang by penalty shout-out after draw 1–1 in UKM Bangi Stadium, their home base. Azri Zulkiflee scored in this match before Mohd Safix from Hanelang equalized. This match also the only UKM FC match at home in FA Cup history. In the second round, they lost into Kelantan at Sultan Mohammad IV Stadium.

=== 2017 season ===
Sulaiman Hussin promoted into UKM FC head coach, and they managed to finish in the top of the league - only lost twice with FELCRA and MOF by 1–0 at home. In knock-out stage, UKM FC defeated Kuching 2–1 on quarter-final, before qualified into final stage after beating Shahzan Muda 1–0 on semi-final. UKM FC lost 2-3 into Sime Darby, but both of them already qualified into 2018 Malaysia Premier League. But one month after final, Sime Darby decided to withdraw from the Premier League next season and focused into develop youth football, ending their involvement as a professional club. The club now competes in the KLFA First Division state league as an amateur club.

On 2017 Malaysia FA Cup, they received the bye in the first round and defeated by Sabah at Likas Stadium in the second round.

=== 2018 season ===
The club has been promoted to Malaysia Premier League despite losing in the 2017 Malaysia FAM League Finals against Sime Darby. At the beginning of the 2018 season, the club signed four foreign players including one player from Asia. They were Waheed Oseni, Redouane Zerzouri, Atuheire Kipson and Nam Se-in. Due to poor performance, Atuheire Kipson was dropped by the club during mid-season and he was replaced by former MISC-MIFA forward, Michael Chukwubunna.

The change galvanized UKM, as they finished the league season in 8th place, and were runners-up of the inaugural Malaysia Challenge Cup. Michael Chukwubunna also finished as top scorer in the latter competition with 13 goals.

=== 2019 season ===
Despite the team good performance in the league and cup, UKM FC were barred to participate in the 2019 Malaysia Premier League by Malaysia Football League on 28 November 2018, after the club failed to submit their registration paperwork on time, and the paperwork sent to MFL after they are given 7 days grace period are incomplete. However, on 10 December 2018, they are given a second chance by MFL to appeal for reinstatement to Premier League, which they do successfully, although MFL served UKM with a fine and warning for their initial failure.

In this season, UKM recorded the biggest win in their Premier League history, as they demolished Sarawak 4–0 on March 2, 2019. They are also recorded the first ever win on Malaysia FA Cup history, won 5–1 after beating Protap at UKM Bangi Stadium on April 2, 2019.

=== 2020 season and end of involvement in Malaysian League ===
In the truncated 2020 season due to COVID-19 pandemic, UKM FC managed to finish in the 9th position out of 12 teams. But the pandemic hit the football community hard on the finances, including the team. After the university management has pulled the full financial support and the team was re-registered under a new private entity, they failed to give FAM concrete proof they have financial backing for the 2021 season. As a consequence, FAM expelled the team from the Premier League.

Although UKM FC can apply for registration in the M3 League or below, as of 2022, they have not involved in any of the leagues.

== Stadium and locations ==
Coordinates	Location	Stadium	Capacity	Year
2°55′55″N 101°47′04″E	Bangi	UKM Bangi Stadium	500	2015–2017, 2019
3°15′18″N 101°39′26″E	Selayang	MP Selayang Stadium	16,000	2018
3°06′02″N 101°43′17″E	Kuala Lumpur	Kuala Lumpur Stadium	18,000	2019–Present

== Sponsors ==
Period	Sportswear	Shirt sponsor
2015	Kika	Kementerian Pendidikan Malaysia
2016	Ultron	Kementerian Pengajian Tinggi Malaysia (Soaring Upwards)
2017	Warrix Sports	Kopi Pak Belalang and Kementerian Pengajian Tinggi Malaysia (Soaring Upwards)
2018	Skyhawk	Kopi Pak Belalang and Fusionet
2019	Skyhawk	Universiti Kebangsaan Malaysia
2020	Line 7	Universiti Kebangsaan Malaysia

== Season by season record ==
Update on 12 October 2019.
- Note :
- Pld = Played, W = Win, D = Draw, L= Loss, F = Goal for, A = Goal against, D = Goal difference, Pts = Points, Pos = Position

1st or Champions 2nd or Runner-up 3rd place Promotion Relegation

Season	Domestic League									Domestic Cup			Overall Top Goalscorer	
Season	Division	P	W	D	L	F	A	Pts	Pos	FA Cup	Malaysia Cup	Challenge Cup	Name	Goals
2015	Malaysia FAM League	18	6	7	5	26	20	25	4th	did not participate	did not qualify	Not yet held	(Malaysia) Hafizudin Sulaiman	8
2016	Malaysia FAM League	14	4	4	6	13	16	16	5th	Second round	did not qualify	Not yet held	(Malaysia) Hadzirun Che Hamid, Faiz Bandong, Gusti Ishak, Azri Zulkiflee	2
2017	Malaysia FAM League	14	8	4	2	24	11	28	1st^{1} (promoted)	Second round	did not qualify	Not yet held	(Malaysia) Hasrul Nurkholis Hasim	10
2018	Malaysia Premier League	20	6	4	10	26	32	22	7th	Third round	did not qualify	Runners-up	(Nigeria) Michael Ijezie	16
2019	Malaysia Premier League	20	6	4	10	28	32	22	8th	Third round	did not qualify	Runners-up	(Croatia) Mateo Roskam	16
2020	Malaysia Premier League	11	3	3	5	11	17	12	9th	Second round^{2} (cancelled)	did not qualify	Did not held^{2}		

- ^{1} : They finished first in the league and qualified for knockout stage, ended as runners-up as they lost 2–3 on aggregate by Sime Darby.
- ^{2} : Due to the COVID-19 pandemic, the tournament was cancelled.

== 2020 squad ==
As of 11 June 2020

Note: Flags indicate national team as defined under FIFA eligibility rules; some limited exceptions apply. Players may hold more than one non-FIFA nationality.

No.	Pos.	Nation	Player
1	DF	(Malaysia) MAS	Syed Irfan Syafiq
2	DF	(Ghana) GHA	Ignatius Adukor
3	DF	(Malaysia) MAS	Kalaiharasan Letchumanan
4	MF	(Malaysia) MAS	Asnan Ahmad (captain)
5	DF	(Malaysia) MAS	Hafizudin Sulaiman
6	MF	(Malaysia) MAS	Saiful Hasnol
7	MF	(Malaysia) MAS	Azri Zulkiflee
8	FW	(Malaysia) MAS	Nor Farhan Muhammad
10	MF	(Malaysia) MAS	Hafizi Amiruddin
11	DF	(Malaysia) MAS	Irwan Syazmin
12	DF	(Malaysia) MAS	K. Reuben
13	DF	(Malaysia) MAS	Zairul Fitree Ishak
14	DF	(Malaysia) MAS	Zubair Kamarulzaman
15	DF	(South Korea) KOR	Lee Seung-woo
16	FW	(Malaysia) MAS	Zarul Aidiel

No.	Pos.	Nation	Player
17	MF	(Malaysia) MAS	Terence Marieselvam
18	GK	(Malaysia) MAS	Amin Faisal
19	MF	(Malaysia) MAS	Baqiuddin Shamsudin
20	FW	(Malaysia) MAS	Faiz Hanif
21	DF	(Malaysia) MAS	Rafiq Shah Zaim
22	GK	(Malaysia) MAS	Remezey Che Ros
23	DF	(Malaysia) MAS	Imran Azizi
24	MF	(Malaysia) MAS	Syed Sobri
25	DF	(Malaysia) MAS	Tuan Ahmad Muqris
27	DF	(Malaysia) MAS	Rafizi Hamdan
28	DF	(Malaysia) MAS	Talhah Rosli
29	DF	(Malaysia) MAS	Syafiq Azri
30	FW	(Malaysia) MAS	Badrul Amin Hamid
33	FW	(Argentina) ARG	Julián Bottaro
35	FW	(Nigeria) NGA	Akanni-Sunday Wasiu

== Development squads ==
As of 11 June 2020

== Under-21s (2020) ==
As of 11 June 2020

No.	Name	Nationality	Position	D.O.B
Goalkeepers
1	Muhammad Aiman Hakim Mat Tarmizi	(Malaysia)	GK	2000
20	Rishi Kumar a/l Agilan	(Malaysia)	GK	2000
22	Melvin Thiloshen Dass Michal Dass	(Malaysia)	GK	1999
25	Mohammad Ezan Aiman Mohd Ridzuan	(Malaysia)	GK	1999
Defenders
2	Muhammad Ashraf Mohd Zahir	(Malaysia)	RB/RWB	1999
4	Muhammad Syaiful Adha Kamaruzaman	(Malaysia)	CB	2000
5	Muhammad Afif Rafiqin Mohd Yusof	(Malaysia)	CB	2000
12	Ameer Hafiz Mokhtar	(Malaysia)	RB/RWB	2000
15	Muhammad Amierul Aiman Hasani	(Malaysia)	LB/LWB	1999
17	Mohd Danish Affan Mohd Nasir	(Malaysia)	CB	2000
24	Abdul Muiz Saifulzaman	(Malaysia)	LB/LWB	2000
Midfielders
3	Muhammad Zawir Zakwan Hasman	(Malaysia)	RW/RM	2000
6	Muhammad Izham Nor Alizan	(Malaysia)	CM	2000
8	Abdul Qayyum Sarkini	(Malaysia)	RW/RM	2000
9	Faris Akmal Azza Haslija	(Malaysia)	DM/CB	2001
10	Muhammad Zikri Fakhrul Zafran	(Malaysia)	AM/CM	6/6/99
11	Alif Danial Abu Kassim	(Malaysia)	LW /LM	2000
16	Harith Iskandar Hafinizam	(Malaysia)	CM	2000
18	Muhammad Alif Fikri Zainal Abidin	(Malaysia)	CM	2000
21	Ahmad Zaimulzikri Ibrahim	(Malaysia)	LW /LM	7/10/99
Forwards
7	Mohd Arfan Hafizi Mohd Nasaruddin	(Malaysia)	ST	2000
13	Mohd Danish Iskandar Khairudin	(Malaysia)	ST	2000
14	Ahmad Dzikri Radzuan	(Malaysia)	ST	2000
19	Muhammad Afiq Samsuddin	(Malaysia)	ST	2000
23	Ezzat Daniel Zahir	(Malaysia)	ST	2000

== Under-19s (2020) ==
As of 11 June 2020

No.	Name	Nationality	Position	D.O.B
Goalkeepers
1	Mohd Firdaus Amin Zairol Azhar	(Malaysia)	GK	2003
20	Hasbi Hasani Mohd Fauzi	(Malaysia)	GK	2001
22	Amirul Aqasha Shaharudin	(Malaysia)	GK	2002
Defenders
2	Mikael Danish Mohd Adlan	(Malaysia)	RB / RWB	2002
4	Muhammad Hirzi Diniy Mohd Zaki	(Malaysia)	CB	2002
11	Muhammad Adam Iman Nazril	(Malaysia)	CB / LB / RB	2002
12	Fauzan Asnomi	(Malaysia)	LB / LWB	2002
15	Ilhan Hakim Razmat	(Malaysia)	RB / RWB	2002
21	Akmal Hakiem Ibrahim	(Malaysia)	CB / RB	2002
23	Muhammad Aizzat Hakimi Zaini	(Malaysia)	CB	2002
25	Maiyurran a/l Ganesan	(Malaysia)	LB / LWB	2002
Midfielders
3	Muhammad Asyraaf Rifqi Rosli	(Malaysia)	CM	2002
6	Aidil Haikal Azizan	(Malaysia)	RW /RM	2002
8	Muhammad Aliff Aiman Mohd Aznam	(Malaysia)	LW / LM	2002
14	Muhammad Zulkarnain Zainorin	(Malaysia)	CM	2001
17	Muhammad Danial Hakimi Salehudin	(Malaysia)	RW /RM	2002
18	Mohd Aidil Faris Abdul Malek	(Malaysia)	LW /LM	2002
19	Muhammad Nazarul Ikram Mohd Nizam	(Malaysia)	CM	2002
24	Muhammad Arif Najmi Mohd Khalid	(Malaysia)	CM	2002
Forwards
5	Muhammad Aiman Daniel Mazlan	(Malaysia)	ST	2002
7	Afdal Shahryll Nizam	(Malaysia)	ST	2002
9	Muhammad Amir Zakwan Mohd Asrani Ramu	(Malaysia)	ST	2002
10	Sidhata Gautam a/l Selvam	(Malaysia)	ST	2002
13	Fehriz Hakim Tadjul Hakma	(Malaysia)	ST	2002
16	Muhammad Adam Syafiq Ahmad Faizal	(Malaysia)	ST	2001

== Management team (2020) ==
=== Club personnel ===
Position	Name
Team manager	(Scotland) Zach Gillan
Assistant manager	(Malaysia) Suhaimi Suliman
Head coach	(Malaysia) Sulaiman Hussin
Assistant coach	(Malaysia) Kamarudin Anuar
Assistant coach	(Malaysia) Yusrizal Yusoff
Assistant coach	(Malaysia) Rezal Zambery Yahya
Goalkeeping coach	(Malaysia) Abdul Rahman Baba
Fitness coach	(Malaysia) Ashadi Mohd Yusoff
Team doctor	(Malaysia) Muhamad Karbela Reza Ramlan
Team doctor	(Malaysia) Nik Alif Azriq Nik Abdullah
Physiotherapist	(Malaysia) Mohd Tasnim Abu Mansor
Masseur	(Malaysia) Kamal Hassan
Kitman	(Malaysia) Mohd Raffiq Roslan

== Managerial history ==
Years	Name	Nationality	Games	Win	Draw	Lose	Win %	Honours
2015	Asnan Mohamad Zuki	Malaysia	18	6	7	5	33.33%	
2016	Lim Kim Lian	Malaysia	16	4	5	7	25%	
2017–2020	Sulaiman Hussin	Malaysia	97	40	24	33	41.23%	Runners-up of FAM League (2017); Runners-up of Challenge Cup (2018, 2019)

== Honours ==
=== League ===
- Malaysia FAM League
  - Runners-up (1): 2017

=== Cup ===
- Malaysia Challenge Cup
  - Runners-up (2): 2018, 2019

== Affiliated clubs ==
- Sime Darby
- Malaysian University F.T.
