= Internet in Malaysia =

Since its beginnings in 1995, the Internet in Malaysia has become the main platform for free discussion in the country's otherwise tightly controlled media environment. As of Q1 2017, Malaysia had broadband penetration rates of 103.6% (per 100 inhabitants) and 81.8% (per 100 households).

== History ==
Malaysia began its Internet services in 1987 with MIMOS (Malaysian Institutes of Microelectronics Systems) as the sole provider. MIMOS was first established in 1985 to provide critical infrastructure for the advancement of the local electronics industry. The first Internet service in Malaysia, known as the Rangkaian Komputer Malaysia (RangKoM), connects all the universities in Malaysia to MIMOS to enable researchers from the universities to communicate with each other. The main applications used at that time were e-mails and electronic forums (such as Usenet) and because the main users were mainly academicians and researchers, the information being exchanged were mostly academic related. The conception of RangKoM allowed MIMOS and the universities to create the local talent pool in computer networks which at that time was a very new subject area in Malaysia.

In 1992, the Joint Advanced Research Integrated Network (JARING) was conceived by MIMOS as part of the 6th Malaysia Plan to provide Internet services to the nation. JARING was connected to many research and academic institutions, including several government and private agencies. Its main objective is to support the education, research and commercialization activities in Malaysia. JARING also had a gateway to the international Internet. A leased line to the United States with the speed of 64 kbit/s was introduced in November 1992.

Datacraft Asia provided the Cisco Systems AGS router for the Internet connection to JARING in February 1993.

The year 1995 is considered the beginning of the Internet age in Malaysia. The growth in the number of Internet hosts in Malaysia began around 1996. The country's first search engine and web portal company, Cari Internet, was also founded that year. According to the first Malaysian Internet survey conducted from October to November 1995 by MIMOS and Beta Interactive Services, one out of every thousand Malaysians had access to the Internet (20,000 Internet users out of a population of 20 million). In 1998, this number grew to 2.6% of the population. The total number of computer units sold, which was 467,000 in 1998 and 701,000 in 2000 indicated an increasing growth.

In 2005 the National Public Policy Workshop (NPPW) proposed a strategy to increase the uptake of Information and communications technology (ICT) and the Internet. Among the outcomes of the NPPW was the High Speed Broadband initiative launched in 2010. As of July 2012 Internet users in Malaysia reached 25.3 million. Out of that number, there are 5 million broadband users, 2.5 million wireless broadband users and 10 million 3G subscribers.

In January 2013, Maxis launch their 4G FDD-LTE network, and this is the first ISP in Malaysia launch 4G FDD-LTE network. After a few months, Celcom in April launch their 4G FDD-LTE network. Following ISP is DiGi in July, U Mobile in December. After 3 years in 2016 April, Unifi Mobile launch their 4G TDD-LTE network, and this is the first ISP in Malaysia launch 4G TDD-LTE network. After a few months, Yes 4G in June launch their 4G TDD-LTE network.

== Speed ==
As of September 2023, Malaysia's average internet speed for fixed broadband is 100.57 Mbit/s, ranking it 41st in the world. Average speed for mobile connection speed has also gone up to 61.50 Mbit/s, ranking 41st overall.

For this market analysis in Q3 2023, TIME dot com was the fastest fixed broadband provider among top providers in Malaysia, with a speed up to 110.23 Mbit/s. U Mobile is the fastest mobile operator among Malaysia's top providers, with speeds of up to 39.40 Mbit/s in 4G network.

== Access technologies ==
=== Cellular data ===
In 2019, the government of Malaysia started trials of the 5G network, which is officially rolled out by the end of 2021 on Kuala Lumpur, Putrajaya and Cyberjaya.

All ISP are closedown the 3G network nationwide on 31 December 2021. But Digi extended the 3G network shutdown in Northern (Perak, Penang, Kedah, Perlis) and Central (WP.KL/Putrajaya/Selangor) to January 3 / January 6, 2022 respectively because of floods.

5G services in Malaysia was launched on 15 December 2021, and the first run ISP was Yes. But the Malaysia 5G network was provided by Digital Nasional Berhad as a Single Wholesale Network (SWN) companies. Customers of unifi Mobile should be able to enjoy the 5G services in Malaysia at the same time with Yes 4G, but unfortunately Telekom Malaysia didn't provide any further details after they announced signing up for 5G trials with DNB.

List of cellular data and mobile broadband connection providers (List updated until November 2024):
Internet Service Provider	Cellular Service Technology	Voice Over LTE (VoLTE)	Voice Over WiFi (VoWiFi)	CA	MIMO	QAM	Frequency (MHz)	Internet Download Speed / Notes
Celcom Digi d.b.a. **CelcomDigi**	EDGE 4G LTE, 4G LTE-A 5G NR	Yes	Yes	2CA (1A-3A, 3A-8A) 3CA (1A-3A-8A) **900(B8)**, **1800(B3)**, 2100(B1)	up to 64T64R	download up to 256; upload up to 64	2G: **900**, 1800 4G: 900(B8), **1800(B3)**, 2100(B1), 2600(B7) 5G: **700(n28)**, 3500(n78)	4G up to 1 Gbit/s, average to 55 Mbit/s.; Telco using same network with **Celcom** by MVNO are Hello SIM, redONE, Tune Talk, XOX.; Telco using same network with **DiGi** by MVNO are Mcalls, speakOUT & Tone Wow.; Total subscribers in Q2 2024 is 20.06 million excluding MVNO.
Maxis	EDGE 4G LTE, 4G LTE-A 5G NR	Yes	Yes	3CA (1A-3A-7A) **1800(B3)**, **2100(B1)**, **2600(B7)**	up to 32T32R	download up to 256; upload up to 64	2G: **900**, 1800 4G: 900(B8), **1800(B3)**, 2100(B1), 2600(B7) 5G: **700(n28)**, 3500(n78)	4G up to 1 Gbit/s, average to 63 Mbit/s.; Telco using same network by MVNO are Ansar Mobile & BeOne; Total subscribers in Q3 2024 is 12.86 million excluding MVNO.
U Mobile	EDGE 4G LTE, 4G LTE-A 5G NR	Yes	Yes	2CA (3A-7A, 3A-8A) 900(B8), **1800(B3)**, **2600(B7)**	up to 32T32R	download up to 256; upload up to 64	2G: by Maxis 4G: 900(B8), **1800(B3)**, 2100(B1), 2600(B7) 5G: **700(n28)**, 3500(n78)	4G up to 480 Mbit/s, average to 57 Mbit/s.; 2G services are provided by Maxis through roaming agreements.; Total subscribers in Q4 2023 is 9 million.
Unifi Mobile	EDGE 4G WiMAX, 4G LTE, 4G LTE-A 5G NR	Yes	Yes	2CA (40C) **2300(B40)**	4T4R	download up to 256; upload up to 64	2G: by Maxis 4G: 850(B5), **2300(B40)**, 2600(B38) 5G: **700(n28)**, 3500(n78)	4G up to 145 Mbit/s, average to 64 Mbit/s.; 2G services are provided by Maxis through roaming agreements.; Total subscribers in Q2 2021 is 2.01 million.
Yes	4G LTE, 4G LTE-A 5G NR	Yes	Yes	2CA (20A-38A, 38A-40A) **800(B20)**, 2300(B40), **2600(B38)**	up to 32T32R	download up to 256; upload up to 64	4G: 800(B20), 2300(B40), **2600(B38)** 5G: **700(n28)**, 3500(n78)	4G up to 195 Mbit/s, average to 45 Mbit/s.; Total subscribers in Q1 2022 is 1.70 million.

*: Note that the bolded parts of the "CA" and "Frequency" section is the most used frequency by the mobile operator.

=== Digital subscriber line (DSL) ===
As of June 2012 there were 1,705,000 DSL connections. TM Net (Unifi), a subsidiary of Telekom Malaysia (TM), is Malaysia's largest Internet service provider. While there are many ISPs in Malaysia, TM's ownership of the nation's last mile connections restricts competition to densely populated areas in major cities. Since there is no local loop unbundling, TM Net enjoys a virtual monopoly of the broadband market.

DSL connections are provided by:

Internet service provider	DSL service technology	Internet download speed	Internet upload speed	Notes
Maxis	VDSL2 (for high-rise buildings only)	Maximum 50 Mbit/s	Maximum 50 Mbit/s	Low availability, will be use fiber FTTH.
Unifi	VDSL2 (for high-rise buildings only)	Maximum 50 Mbit/s	Maximum 50 Mbit/s	Low availability, will be use fiber FTTH.
Unifi Lite (Streamyx)	ADSL, ADSL2/ADSL2+	Maximum 10 Mbit/s	Maximum 5 Mbit/s	Closed for registration. Current unifi Lite users are suggested to migrate to unifi Air.

=== Fiber Optics ===
Telekom Malaysia Bhd. has spent about RM1.9 billion, with the inclusion government funds amounting to RM990 million in the installation of high-speed broadband services throughout Malaysia. The four initial areas that will be covered by high speed broadband services, that is being launched in March 2010 are Shah Alam, Subang Jaya, Taman Tun Dr Ismail and Bangsar.

The benefits announced with the implementation of high speed broadband include smoother e-commerce activities, Internet-based health services, voice over IP (VoIP) communications, web surfing that contains detailed pictures and graphics, as well as faster data downloads. It has been promised that video-streaming will be smoother and Internet Protocol television (IPTV) could take off in Malaysia.

Fiber to the x connections are provided by:

Internet Service Provider	Fiber service coverage	Internet download speed	Internet upload speed
Unifi	East and West Malaysia	From 100 Mbit/s to 2 Gbit/s	From 50 Mbit/s to 1 Gbit/s
Maxis	East and West Malaysia	From 100 Mbit/s to 2 Gbit/s	From 50 Mbit/s to 1 Gbit/s
TIME	West Malaysia (for high-rise or business building only)	From 200 Mbit/s to 2 Gbit/s	From 200 Mbit/s to 500 Mbit/s
Celcom Digi d.b.a. **CelcomDigi**	East and West Malaysia	From 100 Mbit/s to 2 Gbit/s	From 50 Mbit/s to 1 Gbit/s
PR1MA Communications	1Malaysia People's Housing Programme	From 30 Mbit/s and 60 Mbit/s	From 30 Mbit/s and 60 Mbit/s
Allo City Broadband (Tenaga Nasional Berhad)	Selected areas in West Malaysia (Melaka, Perak, Cyberjaya, Kedah, Penang)	From 100 Mbit/s to 1 Gbit/s	From 100 Mbit/s to 1 Gbit/s
Symphonet	Selected areas in West Malaysia	From 30 Mbit/s to 100 Mbit/s	From 30 Mbit/s to 100 Mbit/s
ViewQwest	Selected areas in West Malaysia	From 100 Mbit/s to 10 Gbit/s	From 100 Mbit/s to 10 Gbit/s

=== Hotspot ===
Hotspot connections are provided by:

Internet service provider	Hotspot quantity count	Internet service registration	Other
DiGi	Over 7,000	Required	Payment required for connecting to the hotspot.
Unifi (branded as wifi@unifi)	Over 8,000	Not required	Can be used with the i-foundit! app.
Y5ZONE	Over 5,500	Required	For F&B merchants, Y5ZONE Wi-Fi mostly requires a code printed on the receipt.
YES Public Wi-Fi (YES Terragraph)	Over 400	Required	Registration requires linking of social network accounts
WiFi Smart Selangor	Almost 800	Required	Provided by Selangor Government through SMARTSEL Shd Bhd

==== Currently discontinued hotspot services ====
Internet service provider	Hotspot quantity count	Internet service registration	Other
Penang Free Wi-Fi (REDtone)	Over 1,550	Required	Suspended from February 13, 2019, due to its poor network speeds. Most of the hotspots replaced with YES Public Wi-Fi.

== Internet censorship in Malaysia ==
On 30 May 2011, the Malaysian government started to ban some websites, mostly file sharing websites; this is despite a promise not to censor the Internet made by the sixth prime minister of Malaysia, Najib Razak.

== JENDELA Program ==
During the Movement Control Order (MCO) that was imposed to curb the spread of the COVID-19 pandemic, Malaysia's internet traffic has increased by 30% to 70%, while the internet speed has dropped by 30% to 40%. Therefore, the Government of Malaysia launched the JENDELA Program (Jalinan Digital Negara).

The program will be the national digital communication enhancement platform under the 12th Malaysia Plan (2021–2025) that will be implemented in two phases:

Phase 1 (2020 – 2022):

Phase 1, which started from 2020 to 2022, will involve optimising existing resources and infrastructure for both mobile and fixed connectivity by:

- Expanding 4G mobile broadband coverage from 91.8% to 96.9% in populated areas;
- Increasing mobile broadband speeds from 25 Mbit/s to 35 Mbit/s; and
- Enabling as many as 7.5 million premises to access gigabit speeds with fixed broadband services.

This will also involve the gradual switch-off/sunset of 3G networks until the end of 2021, allowing further upgrades to 4G networks as well as strengthening the foundation for 5G networks.

Phase 2 (Beyond 2022):

- Phase 2 of JENDELA involves addressing the remainder of the digital divide not covered under Phase 1, primarily utilising FWA and other fit-for-purpose technologies, as well as priming the nation's transition to 5G; which will take place once action plans to build a robust 4G and fibre platform under Phase 1 are achieved.

This also means that Malaysia's 3G network will gradually be closed. If only 2G/3G network coverage is available in some areas, only 2G networks will be available after the 3G network is closed, which will affect consumers’ experience.

Therefore, the current priority of the Malaysian government is to increase 4G network coverage, from 91.8% of Malaysia's 4G coverage to 96.9%.

In addition, they plan to increase the mobile network speed of mobile phones from 25 Mbit/s to 35 Mbit/s.

They will also ensure that 83% premises nationwide will have access to gigabit speed of fixed broadband

In order to ensure that users using 4G to make calls will not fall back to 2G without 3G network coverage, Malaysian telecom operators have launched VoLTE, and some also provide VoWiFi services.

== Issues with International Routing ==
=== Telekom Malaysia ===
For a long time, there has been criticism surrounding the international routing of Malaysian telecommunications companies. One example is Telekom Malaysia (TM), which faces a cumbersome connection process when linking to a server located in mainland China. To reach China Telecom, for instance, Telekom Malaysia's data packets have to travel through Europe and connect to Points of Presence (PoPs) for Chinese telecommunications companies before finally reaching the China backbone network. This routing method significantly degrades latency and connection quality for TM users attempting to connect to Chinese servers.

Additionally, Telekom Malaysia's routing to certain Cloudflare IP addresses leaves much to be desired. Despite the implementation of Anycast IP, most TM users are redirected to Osaka, Japan, or Hong Kong, China before being connected to the Cloudflare PoP in either of those locations. This routing practice leads to a subpar user experience.

Furthermore, there is a persistent issue of internet congestion between Malaysia and Singapore data centers, particularly during the afternoon to midnight period. This congestion directly affects users accessing platforms such as Facebook, Twitter, Telegram, Instagram, gaming servers, and voice servers that have their servers hosted in Singapore. The severity of the COVID-19 pandemic in Malaysia, which has prompted the government to encourage citizens to work from home, has exacerbated the problem of congested networks for Telekom Malaysia's international connections. To compound matters, TM users have voiced complaints about the degradation of the quality of service, which have been consistently ignored by the company. Reports submitted by users to the Malaysia Communication and Multimedia Commissioner have also failed to yield any response from the authorities.

== See also ==
- Censorship in Malaysia
- History of communications in Malaysia
- National Broadband Initiative (Malaysia)
- Telecommunications in Malaysia
