= Telecommunications in Malaysia =

Telecommunications in Malaysia fall under the oversight of the Malaysian Communications and Multimedia Commission (MCMC). Established under the Communications and Multimedia Act 1998, the MCMC issues licences for broadcasting, postal, and digital signature services, and enforces industry standards nationwide. The commission is also responsible for implementing the regulations set out in the Postal Services Act 2012 and the Digital Signature Act 1997.

At the state level, Sarawak's telecommunications sector is co-regulated by the Sarawak Multimedia Authority (SMA), established under Section 3 of the Sarawak Multimedia Authority Ordinance 2017. Since its establishment, the SMA and MCMC have cooperated on developing and implementing digital economy initiatives and overseeing the rollout of telecommunications infrastructure in Sarawak. In 2022, Sarawak's Ministry of Public Utilities (later renamed the Ministry of Utility and Telecommunication) created a dedicated Telecommunication Division to manage sector reporting directly to the Sarawak Legislative Assembly.

== History ==
For more than a century, Malaysia's telecommunications system has developed from colonial-era telegraph lines into a modern IP-based network. The British colonial administration, present in the region from the 18th century, established the earliest telecommunications facilities. Telegraph services were consolidated under the Posts and Telegraphs Department in the 1800s, with manual magneto-operated telephones introduced in Perak in the 1880s, followed by the establishment of the first public telephone exchange in Ipoh in 1902.

Kuala Lumpur received telephone service in 1891, and at the turn of the century a major telephone line was constructed linking Province Wellesley (Seberang Prai) in Penang to Johor Bahru. In 1915, the first underground cable was laid, connecting the central Perak towns of Taiping, Kampar, and Teluk Anson.

As trade expanded and townships developed, the number of telephone subscribers in Peninsular Malaysia increased substantially. By 1930, an automated magneto exchange was commissioned in Kuala Lumpur on Jalan Weld to accommodate rising call volumes. During the 1930s, all telephone exchanges in the Malayan Trunk System were capable of communicating with exchanges in Java, the Philippines, the United States, Canada, and Mexico through shortwave radio-telephone transmitters. Towards the end of the decade, a Marconi radio terminal was installed at the Kuala Lumpur Telephone Exchange to manage overseas calls.

Much of the telecommunications infrastructure was damaged during World War II and the Japanese occupation. In 1946, after re-establishing their administration in Malaya, the British repaired trunk routes, restored fallen telephone poles, and replaced damaged or stolen copper wires. During the occupation, the Posts and Telegraphs Department had been divided into two separate units. The British initially reunified these entities, but the arrangement was short-lived. With the formation of the Malayan Union on 1 April 1946, the Malaysian Telecommunications Department and Postal Services Department were established; the former managed telegraph, telephone, and wireless services, while the latter handled mail, money orders, and savings accounts.

== Telephones system ==
By 2019, fixed-line telephone subscriptions totalled approximately 6.47 million, while mobile cellular subscriptions reached 44.60 million, corresponding to penetration rates of roughly 20% and 135% respectively. In March 2021, Digital Nasional Berhad was launched to deploy 5G infrastructure, with nationwide 5G coverage expected to reach 80% of populated areas by the end of 2024.

=== Telephone system ===
Domestic communication services in Peninsular Malaysia and East Malaysia are supported by both fixed and wireless infrastructure, including fibre networks, Asymmetrical Digital Subscriber Line networks, mobile base stations, earth stations, and microwave link stations. Intercity communication (backhaul) in both regions primarily relies on fibre-optic connections and fixed wireless systems such as microwave links. Very-small-aperture terminal (VSAT) systems are also used to provide services in rural and remote areas. Major telecommunications operators in Malaysia include CelcomDigi Berhad, Maxis Berhad, U Mobile Sdn Bhd, Telekom Malaysia, YTL Communications, and TIME dotCom.

International connectivity is delivered through submarine cables linked to Tier 1 networks, which can reach all other networks on the Internet via settlement-free interconnection. Major submarine cable providers in Malaysia include Telekom Malaysia and TIME dotCom. Satellite services, operated by MEASAT, provide additional international coverage.

== Broadband ==
Total broadband subscriptions reached 43.378 million in 2019, resulting in a broadband penetration rate of 131.7% per 100 inhabitants.

=== Fixed broadband development ===
In 2019, fixed broadband accounted for 6.79% of the total broadband market, with 2.947 million subscriptions (up from 2.7 million in 2018).

Fixed broadband services are offered through technologies such as Asymmetrical Digital Subscriber Line, symmetric digital subscriber line (SDSL), Very-high-bit-rate Digital Subscriber Line, Fiber-to-the-Home (FTTH), satellite broadband, Fixed Wireless Access (FWA), and Evolution-Data Optimized (EVDO).

The High-Speed Broadband (HSBB) project, introduced in 2008, aimed to enhance broadband quality and enable users in major cities and high-impact economic zones to access speeds of up to 100 Mbit/s. The Suburban Broadband (SUBB) and Rural Broadband (RBB) programmes provide speeds of up to 20 Mbit/s for suburban and rural communities.

On 28 August 2019, the government approved the National Fiberisation and Connectivity Plan (NFCP) for implementation from 2019 to 2023.

The NFCP targeted:

- Achieving an entry-level fixed broadband package priced at 1% of GNI by 2020.
- Ensuring gigabit availability in selected industrial areas by 2020 and all state capitals by 2023.
- Providing 100% availability for premises in state capitals and high-impact areas with speeds of at least 500 Mbit/s by 2021.
- Reaching 20% of suburban and rural premises with speeds of up to 500 Mbit/s by 2022.
- Achieving fibre network pass-through to 70% of schools, hospitals, libraries, police stations, and post offices by 2022.
- Delivering an average speed of 30 Mbit/s in 98% of populated areas by 2023.
- Improving mobile coverage along the Pan Borneo Highway upon project completion.

=== Mobile broadband development ===
In 2019, mobile broadband accounted for 93.21% of the total broadband market, with 40.431 million subscriptions as of Q4 2019 (up from 36.8 million in 2018).

==== Upgrading and expansion of network coverage ====
The Time 3 and Time 3 Extension initiatives oversaw the construction of 1,833 new communications towers in rural areas across Malaysia. In addition, 4,895 base stations at existing towers were upgraded from 2G to 3G/4G to support higher broadband speeds in rural regions.

==== Malaysian Submarine Cable System (MSCS) ====
Introduced in 2014 through a public–private partnership between the MCMC and Telekom Malaysia (TM), the MSCS project was completed in 2017. It provides redundancy to existing domestic submarine cable systems, which have been operating since 1995, and was designed to meet increasing bandwidth demand between Peninsular Malaysia and East Malaysia.

==== Submarine Cable System to Islands ====
Launched in 2017 and completed in 2018, this project upgraded communications infrastructure networks and submarine cable systems connecting the mainland with the islands of Perhentian, Tioman, and Pangkor.

=== Broadband service providers ===
Service providers	Service	
Service providers	Fixed broadband	Mobile broadband
Telekom Malaysia (TM)	✓	✓
Celcom Axiata Berhad (Celcom)	✓	✓
Digi Telecommunications Sdn Bhd (Digi)	✓	✓
Maxis Berhad (Maxis)	✓	✓
U Mobile Sdn Bhd (U Mobile)	✓	✓
YTL Communications (Yes)	✓ (Sabah only excluding Sarawak)	✓

== Mobile cellular ==
The major service providers for mobile cellular services in Malaysia are CelcomDigi Berhad, Maxis Berhad, YTL Communications, and U Mobile Sdn Bhd. As of Q4 2019, mobile cellular subscriptions totalled 44.601 million, with a penetration rate of 135.4% per 100 inhabitants.

Mobile cellular services are also provided by mobile virtual network operators (MVNOs). As of Q4 2019, ten MVNOs were operating in Malaysia.

In March 2021, Digital Nasional Berhad was launched to develop 5G infrastructure and networks nationwide. Malaysia targets achieving 80% coverage of populated areas (COPA) for 5G services by the end of 2024.

As of Q3 2024, 4G mobile coverage in Sarawak stands at 93.87%.

== Internet ==
As of 2018, Malaysia had approximately 28.304 million internet users.^{2} The country's top-level domain is .my. In Q3 2024, internet coverage in Sarawak reached 90.09% in populated areas.

== See also ==
- History of Communications in Malaysia
- Internet in Malaysia
- Malaysian telephone codes
- Malaysian mobile phone codes
- Media of Malaysia

== Notes ==
^{1} Network that can reach every other network on the Internet without purchasing IP transit or paying for peering

^{2} Internet user population is calculated from the Internet Users Survey 2018 (IUS 2018) based on 87.4% of the total population of Malaysia in 2018 (32.385 million). Population data from the Department of Statistics Malaysia (DoSM).
