= Malaysia Super League =

Men's association football league in Malaysia

- Organising body: Malaysian Football League (MFL)
- Founded: 2004; 22 years ago
- Country: Malaysia
- Other club from: Brunei
- Confederation: AFC
- Number of clubs: 12
- Level on pyramid: 1
- Relegation to: Malaysia Premier League (2004–2022); Malaysia A1 Semi-Pro League (2023–present)
- Domestic cup(s): Malaysia FA Cup; Malaysia Cup; Malaysian Charity Shield; MFL Challenge Cup
- International cup(s): AFC Champions League Elite; AFC Champions League Two; ASEAN Club Championship
- Current champions: Johor Darul Ta'zim (12 titles) (2026–27)
- Most championships: Johor Darul Ta'zim (12 titles)
- Most appearances: Indra Putra Mahayuddin (330)
- Top scorer: Bérgson (132 goals)
- Broadcasters: RTM; Astro Arena; Sooka
- Sponsor: Unifi
- Website: www.malaysianfootballleague.com
- Current: 2026–27 Malaysia Super League

The Malaysia Super League (Malay: Liga Super Malaysia), officially known as the Unifi Liga Super for sponsorship purposes, is the highest division of professional men's association football in Malaysia. Organized by the Malaysian football league (MFL), it is the top tier of the Malaysian football league system. The 2026–27 season features 12 clubs, with the campaign running from August 2026 to May 2027.

Established in 2004, the Malaysia Super League replaced Liga Perdana 1 which ran from 1998 to 2003 as Malaysia's premier football competition. It initially operated under a promotion and relegation system with the Malaysia Premier League until the domestic league structure was restructured in 2022.

Since its inception, the league has featured clubs from Malaysia and, in certain seasons, Singapore and Brunei. 37 clubs have competed since the inception in 2004, with eight clubs have won the title. Johor Darul Ta'zim (JDT) is the most successful club to date, having secured 12 championships, also the reigning champions.

== History ==
=== Origins ===
The Malaysia Super League was formed in 2004 following a decision by the Football Association of Malaysia (FAM) to privatise the league. The inaugural season started on 14 February 2004. As a result, the Malaysia Super League Sdn Bhd (or MSL Proprietary Limited) was created to oversee the marketing aspects of the league, but it was not fully privatised.

The league has seen numerous changes to its format from eight clubs, at one point 14 clubs and now 12 clubs and then back to 14 clubs to accommodate changes to the league rules and withdrawal of certain clubs from the league in order to create a competitive environment and professional management among the clubs.

=== Foundation ===
The Malaysian League was revamped to be a fully professional league in 2004 which coined the creation of a new top-tier division, the Malaysia Super League. Between 2004 and 2006, the professional football league in Malaysia was divided into two levels and two groups:

- Top tier: Malaysia Super League (8 teams)
- Second tier: Malaysia Premier League Group A (8 teams)
- Second tier: Malaysia Premier League Group B (8 teams)
- Third tier: Malaysia FAM Cup

The new top-tier Malaysia Super League was competed by eight teams while there were 16 teams competing in the new Malaysia Premier League which was divided into 2 groups. While there were only eight teams in the league prior to the 2006–07 season, positional movements were radical. Successive losses would condemn clubs to a relegation dogfight. Similarly, successive wins would put a team in contention for the title. The Malaysia Super League had gone through two format changes in its short history spanning three years. The Football Association of Malaysia (FAM) decided to expand the Malaysia Super League to accommodate 14 teams instead of eight, which was the number of league teams during the Malaysia Super League's first three seasons. But the plan was held off when some of the teams withdrew from the league due to financial reasons. The 2009 to 2012 seasons were the only seasons that the league would have 14 teams, with all teams playing each other twice culminating in 26 matches per team and 182 matches in total.

For the 2007 season, the Malaysia Premier League was combined into one division rather than two groups and in 2008 the Malaysia FAM League was revamped to a league format instead of a knockout competition format, with the latter itself replaced by a new third tier called the Malaysia A1 Semi-Pro League in 2019:

- Top tier: Malaysia Super League
- Second tier: Malaysia A1 Semi-Pro League

=== Development ===
In 2015, the Football Malaysia Limited Liability Partnership (FMLLP) was created in the course of the privatisation of the Malaysian football league system. The partnership saw all 24 teams in the Malaysia Super League and the Malaysia Premier League involved, the Football Association of Malaysia (FAM) as the Managing Partner and MP & Silva as a special partner (FAM's global media and commercial advisor) to become stakeholders in the company.

The FMLLP owned, operated and ran the Malaysia Super League. Besides that, other competitions in Malaysian football were also under its jurisdiction, which include the Malaysia Premier League, the Malaysia FA Cup, the Malaysia Cup, and the Piala Sumbangsih. It aimed to transform and move Malaysian football forward to another level.

More than a decade after the league's inception, a total of eight clubs have been crowned champions of the Malaysia Super League with Pahang being the first champions. Johor Darul Ta'zim have won the league 7 times while Kedah, Selangor, and Kelantan have won the league twice each; Pahang, Perlis, Negeri Sembilan and LionsXII have won it once. On 9 September 2016, Johor Darul Ta'zim became the first team to win the Malaysia Super League three times consecutively.

== Format and regulations ==
The competition format follows the usual double round-robin format. During the course of a season, which lasts from August to May, each club plays every other club twice, once at home and once away, for 26 matchdays, totaling 182 matches in the season. Most games are played on Saturdays, with a few games played during weekdays. Teams receive three points for a win, one point for a draw, and no points for a loss. Teams are ranked by total points, with the highest-ranked club at the end of the season crowned champions.

=== Promotion and relegation ===
A system of promotion and relegation existed between the Malaysia Super League and the Malaysia Premier League. The two lowest placed teams in the Malaysia Super League were relegated to the Malaysia Premier League, and the top two teams from the Malaysia Premier League were promoted to the Malaysia Super League. Below is a complete record of how many teams played in each season throughout the league's history:

=== Number of clubs throughout the years ===
Period (in years)	No. of clubs
2004–2006	8
2007–2008	13
2009–2012	14
2013–2022	12
2023	14
2024–2026	13
2026–present	12

=== Qualification for AFC competitions ===
The champions of the Malaysia Super League qualify for following season's AFC Champions League group stages. The winners of the Malaysia FA Cup also qualify for the following season's AFC Champions League play-off slots. If a club lost during the play-off slots and were unable to reach group stages, the club will play in the AFC Cup play-off slots.

The number of places allocated to Malaysian clubs in AFC competitions is dependent upon the AFC Club Competitions Rankings, which are calculated based upon the performance of teams competing in the AFC Champions League and the AFC Cup, as well as their national team's FIFA World Rankings in the previous 4 years. Currently, Malaysia are ranked 20th in the AFC Club Competitions Ranking.

=== Club licensing regulations ===
Every team in the Malaysia Super League must have a licence to play in the league, or else they are expelled completely from the Malaysian Football League. To obtain a licence, teams must be financially healthy and meet certain standards of conduct such as organizational management. As part of the privatisation efforts of the league, all clubs competing in the Malaysia Super League will be required to obtain FAM Club Licensing.

As a preliminary preparation towards the total privatisation of the league, FAM Club Licensing was created with the hope of it being enforced throughout the Malaysia Super League fully by the end of 2018 and in the Malaysia Premier League by end of 2019. There are significant benefits of being in the top-division and readiness of the club licensing:

- A greater share of television broadcast licence revenues going to clubs.
- Greater exposure through television and higher attendance levels to help clubs attract more lucrative sponsorships.
- Clubs developing substantial financial muscle through the combination of television and gate revenues, sponsorship and marketing of their team brands. This allows clubs to attract and retain the best players from domestic and international sources and to construct first-class stadium facilities.

FAM also established independent decision-making bodies known as the First Instance Body and Appeals Body that would function as an assessment body and the issuer of the license. These two bodies are composed of members that meet the requirements and conditions set by the AFC Club Licensing Regulations mainly within the field of finance and legal matters.

== Champions ==
=== Season-by-season records ===
#	Season	Champions	Runners-up	Third place
1	2004	Pahang	Public Bank	Perlis
2	2005	Perlis	Pahang	Perak
3	2005–06	Negeri Sembilan	TM	Perak
4	2006–07	Kedah	Perak	(Brunei) DPMM
5	2007–08	Kedah (2)	Negeri Sembilan	Johor FC
6	2009	Selangor	Perlis	Kedah
7	2010	Selangor (2)	Kelantan	Terengganu
8	2011	Kelantan	Terengganu	Selangor
9	2012	Kelantan (2)	(Singapore) Lions XII	Selangor
10	2013	(Singapore) Lions XII	Selangor	Johor Darul Ta'zim
11	2014	Johor Darul Ta'zim	Selangor	Pahang
12	2015	Johor Darul Ta'zim (2)	Selangor	Pahang
13	2016	Johor Darul Ta'zim (3)	Felda United	Kedah
14	2017	Johor Darul Ta'zim (4)	Pahang	Felda United
15	2018	Johor Darul Ta'zim (5)	Perak	PKNS
16	2019	Johor Darul Ta'zim (6)	Pahang	Selangor
17	2020	Johor Darul Ta'zim (7)	Kedah	Terengganu
18	2021	Johor Darul Ta'zim (8)	Kedah Darul Aman	Penang
19	2022	Johor Darul Ta'zim (9)	Terengganu	Sabah
20	2023	Johor Darul Ta'zim (10)	Selangor	Sabah
21	2024–25	Johor Darul Ta'zim (11)	Selangor	Sabah
22	2025–26	Johor Darul Ta'zim (12)	Kuching City	Selangor

Invited clubs

=== Titles by club ===
Clubs in bold compete in the current season. Italics indicates defunct club.

Club	Champions	Runners-up	Winning seasons	Runners-up seasons
**Johor Darul Ta'zim**	12	0	2014, 2015, 2016, 2017, 2018, 2019, 2020, 2021, 2022, 2023, 2024–25, 2025–26	
**Selangor**	2	5	2009, 2010	2013, 2014, 2015, 2023, 2024–25
Kedah Darul Aman	2	2	2007, 2008	2020, 2021
Kelantan	2	1	2011, 2012	2010
Sri Pahang	1	3	2004	2005, 2017, 2019
Perlis	1	1	2005	2009
**Negeri Sembilan**	1	1	2006	2007–08
(Singapore) Lions XII	1	1	2013	2012
Perak	0	2		2006–07, 2018
**Terengganu**	0	2		2011, 2022
Public Bank	0	1		2004
TM	0	1		2005–06
Felda United	0	1		2016
**Kuching City**	0	1		2025–26

Invited clubs

== Clubs ==
=== 2026–27 season ===
Club	Position in 2025–26	First season in top division	First season in Super League	Seasons in top division	Seasons in Super League	First season of current spell in top division	Title wins	Last title
(Brunei) DPMM	10th	2006–07		3		2025–26	0	—
Johor Darul Ta'zim	1st	2002	2006–07	20	18	2006–07	12	2025–26
Kelantan Red Warrior	A1 Semi-Pro League; 4th	2026–27		1		2026–27	0	—
Kuala Lumpur City	4th	1982	2010	30	9	2021	2	1988
Kuching City	2nd	2023		3		2023	0	—
Melaka	11th	2025–26		2		2025–26	0	—
Negeri Sembilan	7th	1982	2005–06	30	12	2022	1	2005–06
PDRM	13th	2007–08		8		2023	0	—
Penang	8th	1982	2004	32	13	2021	3	2001
Sabah	9th	1982	2004	26	8	2020	1	1996
Selangor	3rd	1982	2005–06	38	18	2005–06	6	2010
Star City	6th	2025–26		2		2025–26	0	—
Terengganu	5th	1982	2006–07	36	17	2018	0	—

Note: Top division means the highest football competition in Malaysia which includes the Malaysian League (1982–1988), Semi-Pro League Division 1 (1989-1993), Premier League (1994–97) and Premier League 1 (1998–2003).

=== Former clubs ===
The following clubs had competed in the Malaysia Super League or the top flight M-League before 2004, but are not competing in the Malaysia Super League during the 2026–27 season.

Club	Current league	Position in 2025–26 season	First season in top division	First season in Super League	Seasons in top division	Seasons in Super League	Most recent season in Super League	Title wins	Last title wins
Kelantan The Real Warriors	Ejected	12th in Super League	2023		3		2025–26	—	—
Sri Pahang	Withdraw	7th in Super League	1982	2004	42	20	2013	5	2004
Perak	Dissolved	8th in Super League	1982	2004	40	19	2024–25	2	2003
Kedah Darul Aman	A2 Amateur League	11th in Super League	1982	2004	33	15	2024–25	3	2007–08
Kelantan	Dissolved	14th in Super League	1982	2009	28	11	2023	2	2012
Melaka United	Defunct (2023)	10th in Super League	1982	2006–07	20	7	2022	1	1983
Sarawak United	Dissolved	11th in Super League	2022	2022	1	1	2022	0	—
Petaling Jaya City	Dissolved	9th in Super League	2019	2019	4	4	2022	0	—
Perak II	Dissolved	—	2018	2018	2	2	2019	0	—
Perlis	Dissolved	—	1982	2004	25	8	2011	1	2005
Selangor II	A1 Semi-Pro League	8th in Premier League	2012	2012	6	6	2019	0	—
UiTM United	A2 Amateur League	7th in Premier League	2020	2020	2	2	2021	0	—
Terengganu II	Dissolved	4th in Premier League	2010	2010	7	7	2017	0	—
Sarawak FA	Dissolved	—	1982	2004	29	8	2017	1	1997
(Singapore) LionsXII	Dissolved	—	2012	2012	4	4	2015	1	2013
Felda United	Dissolved	—	2011	2011	8	8	2020	0	—
Armed Forces	A1 Semi-Pro League	3rd in M3 League (Group A)	1982	2013	9	3	2015	0	—
Telekom Malaysia	Dissolved	—	2003	2005–06	4	3	2006–07	0	—
Sime Darby	Dissolved	—	2014	2014	2	2	2015	0	—
UPB-MyTeam	Defunct (2010)	—	2007–08	2007–08	2	2	2009	0	—
KL PLUS	KLFA Division 1	—	2009	2009	2	2	2010	0	—
MPPJ	Selangor League	—	2005	2005	2	2	2005–06	0	—
Public Bank	Dissolved	—	2004	2004	2	2	2005	0	—
Johor Darul Ta'zim II	A1 Semi-Pro League	1st in Premier League	1982	2010	19	1	2010	1	1991
Harimau Muda A	Dissolved	—	2011	2011	1	1	2011	0	—
Kuala Muda NAZA	Kedah League	—	2009	2009	1	1	2009	0	—
Singapore FA	Dissolved	—	1985	—	9	0	—	2	1994
Brunei FA	Dissolved	—	1982	—	14	0	—	0	—
NS Chempaka	Dissolved	—	2002	—	1	0	—	0	—
TUDM	—	—	1988	—	1	0	—	0	—
Olympic 2000	Dissolved	—	1998	—	1	0	—	0	—

Remark : Top-division means the highest football competition in Malaysia which includes the Malaysian League (1982–1988), the Semi-Pro League Division 1 (1989-1993), the Premier League (1994–97) and the Premier League 1 (1998–2003).

=== Privatisation of the league's football clubs ===
The Pahang Football Association became the first FAM affiliate to separate itself from the management of its football team with the formation of Sri Pahang which was now under the management of Pahang FC Sdn Bhd starting from the 2016 Malaysia Super League season onwards.

On 10 January 2016, Johor Football Association became the second FAM affiliate to follow suit when it separated itself from the management of its football team and changing its focus to state football development and the state league while the football team became its own entity as Johor Darul Ta'zim

On 1 November 2016, Melaka United Soccer Association became the third FAM affiliate to follow suit with the privatisation of its football team as a separate entity known as Melaka United for the 2017 Malaysia Super League season onwards.

On 6 November 2016, the FMLLP released an update regarding the club licensing progress where currently only Johor Darul Ta'zim F.C. obtained the CLR while others were still in progress with 80 percent of the requirements completed. All member clubs in the Malaysia Super League and the Malaysia Premier League were required to obtain the CLR with the Malaysia Super League clubs required to obtain it by September 2017 while the Malaysia Premier League clubs were given an extended period from 2019 to 2020 as some clubs had only met 50 percent of the requirements completed. The FMLLP had also suggested the FAM to ensure that clubs in the Malaysia FAM League to meet certain guidelines as this will allow them to get their license if they were to be promoted to the Malaysia Premier League.

In February 2017, the FMLLP released a statement regarding the official status of Johor Darul Ta'zim and Johor Darul Ta'zim II where Johor FA changed its name to Johor Darul Ta'zim II and became an official feeder club for Johor Darul Ta'zim when the feeder club agreement between both clubs were approved on 19 August 2016. Through the agreement, both clubs were allowed an additional four player transfer quota which can be used outside the normal transfer windows for players between both clubs. The feeder club was also required to register a minimum of 12 players under the age of 23 for its squad from 2017. A feeder club will be required to be in the league below the main club at all times which meant that Johor Darul Ta'zim II will never be allowed to get promoted even if the club managed to win the Malaysia Premier League. By 2018, the feeder club must field four players under the age of 23 in their first eleven during match day and the feeder club were allowed to play in other cup competitions where the parent club competed such as the Malaysia Cup and the Malaysia FA Cup.

== Logo evolution ==
Since the inception of the league in 2004, numerous logos have been introduced for the league to reflect the sponsorships and naming rights. In its inaugural season, the Dunhill logo was incorporated as a title sponsor and it was the only season sponsored by the tobacco company before tobacco advertising was banned in the country.

From 2005 to 2010, the Malaysia Super League incorporated the TM brand as part of its logo as the title sponsor. After the end of TM's sponsorship, FAM launched a new logo for the 2011 season where the league was partnered with Astro Media as a strategic partner for the Malaysia Super League's marketing. The Astro brand was only incorporated as part of the Malaysia Super League logo from 2012 until 2014.

In the 2015 season, no title sponsor was incorporated when the league was sponsored by MP & Silva. For the 2016 season a new logo was introduced as part of the takeover of the league by the FMLLP. In 2018 and 2019, the Malaysia Super League logo included the Unifi brand logo as part of the league's sponsorship deal.

The 2018 Malaysia Super League logo was formed as a part of a rebranding due to title sponsorship reasons with TM under the Unifi brand. TM's Unifi brand was the new title sponsor for the Malaysia Super League and the Malaysia Cup following an eight-year partnership deal worth RM480mil until 2025. But, TM pulled out as a sponsor at the end 2019 in order to save costs.

== Sponsorship ==
Season	Sponsors	Brand
2004	Dunhill	Dunhill Liga Super
2005–10	TM	TM Liga Super
2011	No sponsor	Liga Super
2012–14	Astro	Astro Liga Super Malaysia
2015–17	No sponsor	Liga Super Malaysia
2018	Unifi	Unifi Liga Super Malaysia
2019		Liga Super Malaysia
2020	CIMB	CIMB Liga Super Malaysia
2021–23		Liga Super Malaysia
2024–25	CelcomDigi	CelcomDigi Liga Super Malaysia (Note: also known as CelcomDigi & MFL presents 20th Anniversary of Liga Super Malaysia (2004–2024) for 2024–25 season.)
2026-27	Unifi	Unifi Liga Super Malaysia

== Finances ==
The FMLLP introduced a merit-point system in the 2016 season. Points are awarded based on a team's league position, progress in the cup competitions and the number of live matches shown. A point in the season is worth RM41,000.

The money is distributed twice per season, first a basic payment out of league sponsorship, and at the end of the season where all the merit-points have been calculated. For the 2016 season, the first basic payment consisted of a 30 percent cut out of RM70 million in league sponsorship. The Professional Footballers Association of Malaysia (PFAM) is one of the active members in the issue of unpaid salaries.

== Media coverage ==
Radio Televisyen Malaysia (RTM), a free-to-air channel, have been broadcasting domestic football even before the formation of the Malaysia Super League. They continued to broadcast the league most of the time exclusively until the end of 2010 where Astro Media were announced as sponsors and managed the broadcasting rights of the league for four years spanning from 2011 until the 2014 season. During this time, the league was broadcast to one of the cable channels of Astro Media, which was Astro Arena alongside the RTM for the free-to-air broadcast. In 2015, Astro lost the broadcasting rights for the league where the rights were given to Media Prima, a parent company of multiple free-to-air channels alongside RTM.

The broadcasting rights for the 2016 season were given to Media Prima for three years with a maximum of three games in each matchweek that was shown live on television. In 2018, TM bought the exclusive rights of the coverage until 2025. The coverage was aired by Unifi TV (excluding 2019), iflix (until 2019), Media Prima (until 2019), and RTM (excluding 2019).

=== Current ===
Season	Languages	Broadcasters	Channel(s)
2018, 2020–present	Malay	(Malaysia) RTM	Sukan RTM
2020–present	Malay	(Malaysia) RTM	TV Okey
2023–present	Malay	(Malaysia) Astro	Astro Arena Bola; Astro Arena Bola 2

=== Former ===
Season	Languages	Broadcasters	Channel(s)
2005	Malay	(Malaysia) Media Prima	NTV7
2015–2017	Malay	(Malaysia) Media Prima	TV3
2015–2019 and 2022	Malay	(Malaysia) Media Prima	TV9
2011–2014	Malay	(Malaysia) Astro	Astro Arena
2018, 2020–2022	Malay	(Malaysia) Unifi TV	Unifi Sports

== Player records ==
=== All-time top scorers ===
As of 16 April 2025

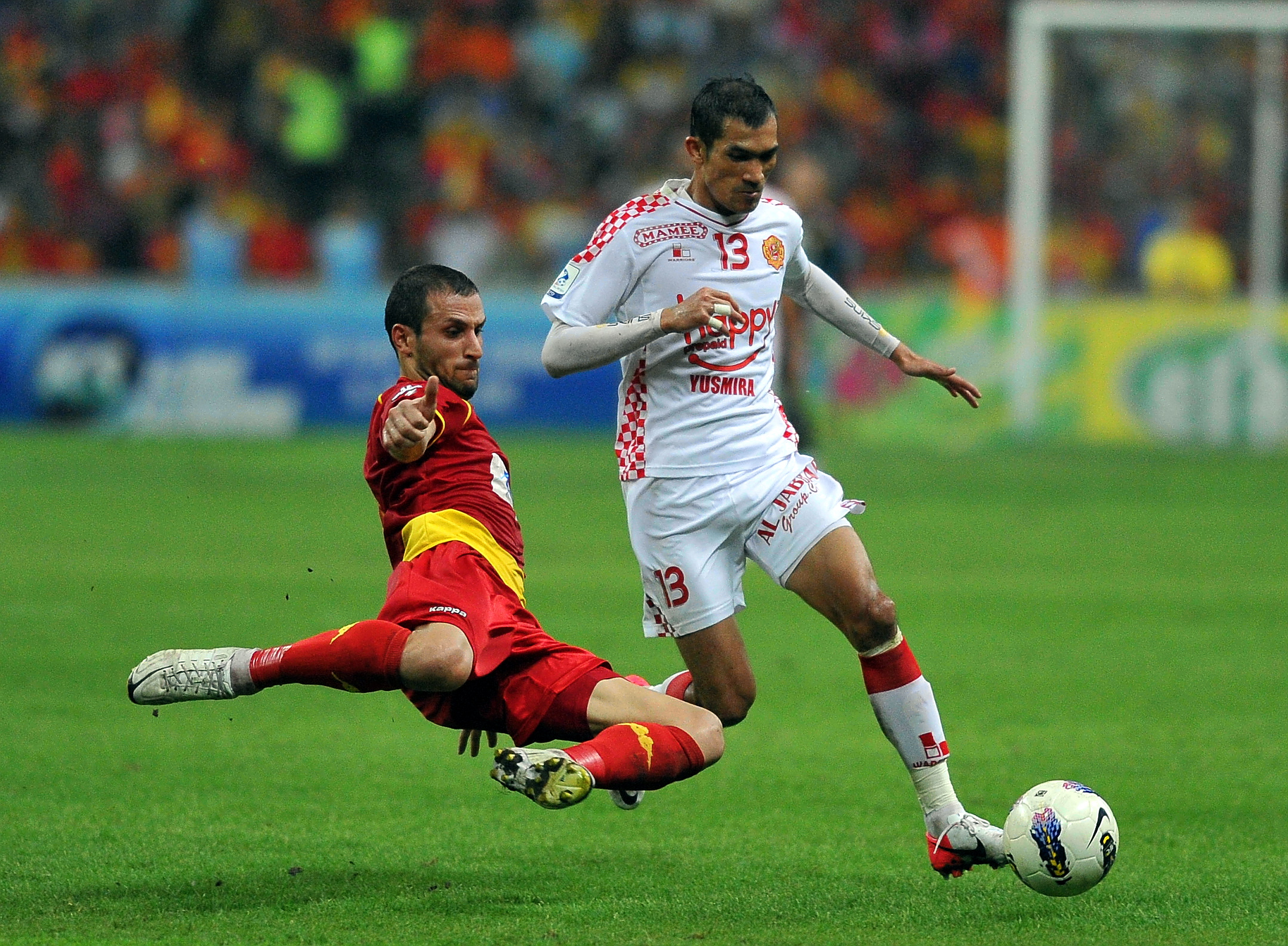
Indra Putra Mahayuddin is the highest-scoring Malaysia-born player in Super League history

Rank	Player	Malaysia Super League club(s)	Goals
1	(Malaysia) Bergson	Johor Darul Ta'zim (132)	132
2	(Malaysia) Indra Putra Mahayuddin	Kelantan (41), Sri Pahang (29), Terengganu II (11), Kuala Lumpur City (12), FELDA United (6), Selangor (3), Kelantan Darul Naim (4)	106
3	(Nigeria) Ifedayo Olusegun	Felda United (5), Melaka United (15), Selangor (50), Kedah (12), PDRM (8)	90
4	(Malaysia) Ashari Samsudin	Terengganu (82), Sri Pahang (3)	85
5	(Malaysia) Mohd Amri Yahyah	Selangor (60), Johor Darul Ta'zim (10) Sabah (9)	79
6	(Malaysia) Baddrol Bakhtiar	Kedah (68), Sabah (10)	78
7	(Malaysia) Norshahrul Idlan Talaha	UPB-MyTeam (14), Kelantan (36), Johor Darul Ta'zim (8), Armed Forces (1), Terengganu (2), FELDA United (4), Pahang (5)	70
8	(Ivory Coast) Kipré Tchétché	Terengganu (33), Kedah (17), Kuala Lumpur City (8), Kuching City (4)	62
9	(Saint Vincent and the Grenadines) Marlon Alex James	Kedah (43), Armed Forces (17)	60
10	(Liberia) Kpah Sherman	PKNS FC (14), Kedah (19), Terengganu (6), Sri Pahang (20)	59
11	(Liberia) Francis Forkey Doe	Terengganu (14), Selangor (18), Kelantan (5), FELDA United (15), Pahang (5)	57
12	(Malaysia) Safee Sali	Selangor (36), Johor Darul Ta'zim (6), PKNS (9), Petaling Jaya (4), Kuala Lumpur City (1)	56
13	(Guinea) Mandjou Keita	Perak (49), Kelantan (5)	54
14	(Malaysia) Mohd Fadzli Saari	Sri Pahang, KL Plus, Selangor	53
15	(Zambia) Phillimon Chepita	Perlis FA (52)	52

=== Golden Boot winners ===
Season	Player	Club	Goals
2004	(Malaysia) Indra Putra Mahayuddin	Sri Pahang	15
2005	(Brazil) Júlio César Rodrigues (Zambia) Zacharia Simukonda	Sabah; Perlis FA	18
2006	(Guinea) Keita Mandjou	Perak	17
2007	(Guinea) Keita Mandjou (Brunei) Shah Razen Said	Perak; DPMM	21
2008	(Saint Vincent and the Grenadines) Marlon Alex James	Kedah	21
2009	(Malaysia) Mohd Nizaruddin Yusof	Perlis FA	18
2010	(Malaysia) Ashari Samsudin	Terengganu	18
2011	(Malaysia) Abdul Hadi Yahya	Terengganu	20
2012	(Cameroon) Jean-Emmanuel Effa Owona (Liberia) Francis Forkey Doe	Negeri Sembilan; Terengganu	15
2013	(Saint Vincent and the Grenadines) Marlon Alex James	ATM FA	16
2014	(Brazil) Paulo Rangel	Selangor	16
2015	(Mali) Dramane Traoré	PDRM	20
2016	(Argentina) Jorge Pereyra Díaz	Johor Darul Ta'zim	18
2017	(Lebanon) Mohamad Ghaddar	Kelantan; Johor Darul Ta'zim	23
2018	(Spain) Rufino Segovia	Selangor	19
2019	(Liberia) Kpah Sherman	PKNS	14
2020	(Nigeria) Ifedayo Olusegun	Selangor	12
2021	(Nigeria) Ifedayo Olusegun	Selangor	26
2022	(Brazil) Bérgson	Johor Darul Ta'zim	29
2023	(Colombia) Ayron del Valle	Selangor	23
2024–25	(Brazil) Bérgson	Johor Darul Ta'zim	32
2025-26	(Brazil) Bérgson	Johor Darul Ta'zim	27

=== Foreign players and transfer regulations ===
The foreign players policy has changed multiple times since the league's inception. In 2009, FAM took a drastic measure when they changed the foreign players policy that banned foreign players from playing in the league until 2011. Foreign players were only allowed be back into the league starting from the 2012 season onwards.

All foreign players must obtain the International Transfer Certificate from their previous national football governing bodies before they can be register with the FAM.

- 2004-2008: 3 foreign players
- 2009–2011: foreign players banned
- 2012: 2 foreign players
- 2013: 3 foreign players
- 2014: 4 foreign players, 3 on the field at a time
- 2015–2017: 4 foreign players, including 1 Asian quota
- 2018–2022: 5 foreign players, including 1 Asian and 1 Asean quota
- 2023: 9 foreign players, including 1 Asian and 1 Asean quota (allowed five to be fielded, 3 + 1 Asian and 1 ASEAN)
- 2024-2025: 12 foreign players (AFC competitions), 9 for the league (7 on the field, including 1 Asian, 1 ASEAN and 1 reserve foreign player)
- 2025-2026: 15 foreign players (7+1 on the field, including 1 Asian, 2 ASEAN and 1 reserve foreign player)

== Records and achievements ==
=== Club records ===
- Most titles: **12**, Johor Darul Ta'zim
- Most consecutive title wins: **12**
  - Johor Darul Ta'zim (2014, 2015, 2016, 2017, 2018, 2019, 2020, 2021, 2022, 2023, 2024, 2025-26)
- Biggest title-winning margin: **23 points**
  - 2018 season; Johor Darul Ta'zim (59 points) over Perak (36 points)
- Smallest title-winning margin: **2 points**
  - 2006–07 season; Kedah (55 points) over Perak (53 points)
- Most points in a season: **76 points**, Johor Darul Ta'zim (2023)
- Most wins in total: **269**, Johor Darul Ta'zim
- Most wins in a season: **25**, Johor Darul Ta'zim (2023)
- The biggest home win:
  - Johor Darul Ta'zim **9–0** Kelantan Darul Naim (10 April 2025)
- The biggest away win:
  - Kelantan The Real Warriors **1-14** Johor Darul Ta'zim (10 May 2026)
  - Kelantan **2–11** Selangor (25 August 2023)
- Matches with most goals: **15**
  - Kelantan The Real Warriors **1-14** Johor Darul Ta'zim (10 May 2026)
- Most defeats in a season: **22**, Kelantan (2023)
- Most goals scored in a season: **100**
  - Johor Darul Ta'zim (2023)
- Most goals conceded in a season: **121**
  - Kelantan (2023)
- Fewest goals conceded in a season: **7**
  - Johor Darul Ta'zim (2023)

=== Player records ===
- Most league appearances: **330**
  - (Malaysia) Indra Putra Mahayuddin
- Most goals scored: **132**
  - (Brazil) Bérgson
- Most goals scored in one match: **6**
  - (Brazil) Bérgson (against Kelantan Darul Naim on 10 May 2026 in a 1-14 win)
- Most league titles won: **11**
  - (Malaysia) Aidil Zafuan
- Top goal scorer in a single league season: **32**
  - (Brazil) Bérgson (2024–25)
- Most Golden Boot award: **3**
  - (Brazil) Bérgson (2022, 2024–25, 2025-26)
- Most clean sheets: **53**
  - (Malaysia) Farizal Marlias
- Most clubs played for: **7**
  - (Malaysia) Khairu Azrin Khazali
  - (Malaysia) Shahril Saa'ri
- Oldest goal scorer:
  - (Malaysia) Indra Putra Mahayuddin ~ **42 years, 3 months, 14 days** (for Kelantan United vs Kelantan on 16 December 2023)
- Youngest player:
  - (Malaysia) Farish Ainun, **16 years, 11 months, 13 days** (for Kelantan vs Negeri Sembilan on 9 August 2023)
- Youngest goal scorer:
  - (Malaysia) Akhyar Rashid, **18 years, 9 months, 11 days** (for Kedah vs PKNP on 2 August 2019)
- Most seasons appeared in: **19**
  - (Malaysia) Farizal Marlias (from 2006 to 2025)

=== Attendance ===
All data available to the public starting from the 2015 season.

Season	Overall Attendance		Top 3			Bottom 3		
Season	Total	Average	Club	Attendance	Average	Club	Attendance	Average
2015	883,225	6,691	**Johor Darul Ta'zim**	**184,198**	**16,745**	ATM FA	22,750	2,068
2015	883,225	6,691	Kelantan	108,696	9,881	PDRM FA	22,300	2,027
2015	883,225	6,691	Pahang	107,693	9,790	Sime Darby FC	17,960	1,633
2016	902,643	6,838	**Johor Darul Ta'zim**	**191,982**	**17,453**	PDRM	32,950	2,995
2016	902,643	6,838	Perak	121,687	11,062	Sarawak	22,892	2,081
2016	902,643	6,838	Kedah	103,421	9,402	Terengganu II	20,210	1,837
2017	872,108	6,607	**Johor Darul Ta'zim**	**187,557**	**17,051**	Sarawak	35,206	3,201
2017	872,108	6,607	Kedah	161,626	14,693	PKNS FC	30,234	2,749
2017	872,108	6,607	Pahang	82,964	7,542	Terengganu II	11,995	1,090
2022	623,384	4,723	**Johor Darul Ta'zim**	**181,316**	**16,484**	Kuala Lumpur City	15,105	1,374
2022	623,384	4,723	Sabah	98,954	8,996	Sarawak United	12,181	1,108
2022	623,384	4,723	Terengganu	72,790	6,618	Petaling Jaya City	7,867	716
2023	969,985	5,330	**Johor Darul Ta'zim**	**229,097**	**17,623**	Kuala Lumpur City	22,935	1,764
2023	969,985	5,330	Sabah	128,270	9,867	PDRM	14,084	1,083
2023	969,985	5,330	Kedah Darul Aman	112,456	8,650	Kelantan United	10,102	777

Source: FAM-CMS

==== Notes ====
- No data from 2018 to 2021 season

=== Clubs ranking in Asia ===
The final ranking position(s) for each participating MSL club in AFC competitions.

Year	Rank	Points	Club
2015	**59**	**20.295**	**Kelantan**
2015	68	18.294	Johor Darul Ta'zim
2015	88	12.295	Selangor
2015	96	10.961	Pahang
2015	108	9.295	Terengganu I
2016	**45**	**30.142**	**Johor Darul Ta'zim**
2016	79	14.477	Selangor
2016	93	10.809	Kelantan
2016	100	9.476	Pahang
2017	**34**	**38.95**	**Johor Darul Ta'zim**
2017	94	9.951	Selangor
2017	98	9.617	Pahang
2017	120	5.284	Felda United
2017	132	4.617	Kelantan
2018	**23**	**48.70**	**Johor Darul Ta'zim**
2018	95	12.99	Pahang
2018	108	9.66	Selangor
2018	114	8.66	Felda United
2019	**33**	**40.77**	**Johor Darul Ta'zim**
2019	112	9.06	Selangor
2019	122	8.06	Felda United
2019	125	7.39	Perak

*Bold denotes the highest ranked club for each year at the end of the season.

== All-time league table ==
The all-time Malaysia Super League table is a cumulative record of all match results, points and goals of every team that has played in the league since its inception in 2004. The table that follows is accurate as of the end of the 2025–26 season. Teams in bold are part of the 2026–27 season.

Pos	Club	No. of seasons	Pld	W	D	L	GF	GA	GD	Pts
1	**Johor Darul Ta'zim**	18	425	292	76	65	987	349	+638	952
2	**Selangor**	20	456	235	101	121	835	545	+290	796
3	**Terengganu**	18	413	194	96	128	680	527	+153	688
4	Sri Pahang	20	448	178	110	172	651	660	−9	630
5	Perak	20	411	160	91	169	600	600	0	601
6	Kedah Darul Aman	17	356	174	81	116	588	518	+70	590
7	**Negeri Sembilan**	13	303	106	83	126	423	460	−37	395
8	Kelantan	11	252	115	49	98	413	412	+1	391
9	**Penang**	14	325	80	68	170	380	591	−211	308
10	Perlis	8	189	82	41	68	282	241	+41	285
11	**Sabah**	10	224	76	54	93	307	356	−49	282
12	**Kuala Lumpur City**	10	230	74	59	107	301	359	−58	275
13	(Pahang) Felda United	8	173	61	43	61	228	247	−19	226
14	(Terengganu) T–Team (Note: T–Team became the reserve team of Terengganu from 2018 onwards.)	7	166	54	38	74	203	242	−39	197
15	Sarawak	8	183	41	38	101	219	347	−128	164
16	(Selangor) PKNS (Note: PKNS became the reserve team of Selangor from 2020 onwards.)	6	136	41	39	56	200	215	−15	162
17	**(Malaysia) PDRM**	8	179	43	31	105	183	378	−195	160
18	(Singapore) LionsXII	4	92	44	22	26	142	104	+38	156
19	(Malacca) Melaka United	7	145	39	36	70	184	276	−92	150
20	**(Sarawak) Kuching City**	3	74	28	20	26	107	93	+14	104
21	(Brunei) **DPMM**	3	72	23	20	29	103	120	−17	89
22	(Malacca) TM Melaka	3	66	26	17	20	83	75	+8	88
23	(Kuala Lumpur) ATM	3	66	18	15	33	85	106	−21	69
24	(Selangor) PLUS	2	52	19	11	22	64	55	+9	68
25	(Selangor) Petaling Jaya City	3	55	15	19	21	55	74	−19	64
26	(Selangor) Public Bank	2	42	18	9	15	60	59	+1	63
27	(Selangor) MPPJ	2	42	17	5	20	57	65	−8	56
28	(Selangor) UPB-MyTeam	2	50	15	7	28	58	89	−31	52
29	(Malaysia) Harimau Muda A	1	26	12	7	7	38	28	+10	43
30	(Perak) PKNP (Note: PKNP became the reserve team of Perak from 2020 onwards)	2	44	10	11	23	47	71	−24	41
31	(Selangor) Sime Darby	2	44	10	11	33	52	80	−28	41
32	**(Kelantan)** Kelantan TRW	3	74	10	9	55	62	210	−148	39
33	(Kedah) Kuala Muda Naza	1	26	12	1	13	32	41	−9	37
34	(Putrajaya) **Immigration**	1	24	9	5	10	38	43	−5	32
35	(Selangor) UiTM United	2	33	8	6	19	33	56	−23	30
36	(Selangor) Petaling Jaya City	1	22	8	2	12	22	29	−7	26
37	(Malacca) **Melaka**	1	24	4	7	13	18	45	−27	19
38	Sarawak United (Note: Sarawak United not to be confuse with Sarawak, is part of a new entity club after being revamp from 2020 onwards.)	1	22	5	2	15	19	50	−31	17
39	Johor FA (Note: Johor FA not to be confuse with Johor FC, is both rebranded with Johor FA becoming the reserve team of Johor Darul Ta'zim from 2014 onwards.)	1	26	5	1	20	18	66	−48	16
40	**Kelantan Red Warrior**									
41	**(Kuala Lumpur) UM-Damansara United**									

== See also ==
- List of Liga Super seasons
- FAM Football Awards
- History of Malaysian football
- Expatriate footballers in Malaysia
- List of Liga Super managers
- List of foreign Malaysian League players
- Football in Malaysia
- Malaysia League XI
