= History of telecommunications in Malaysia =

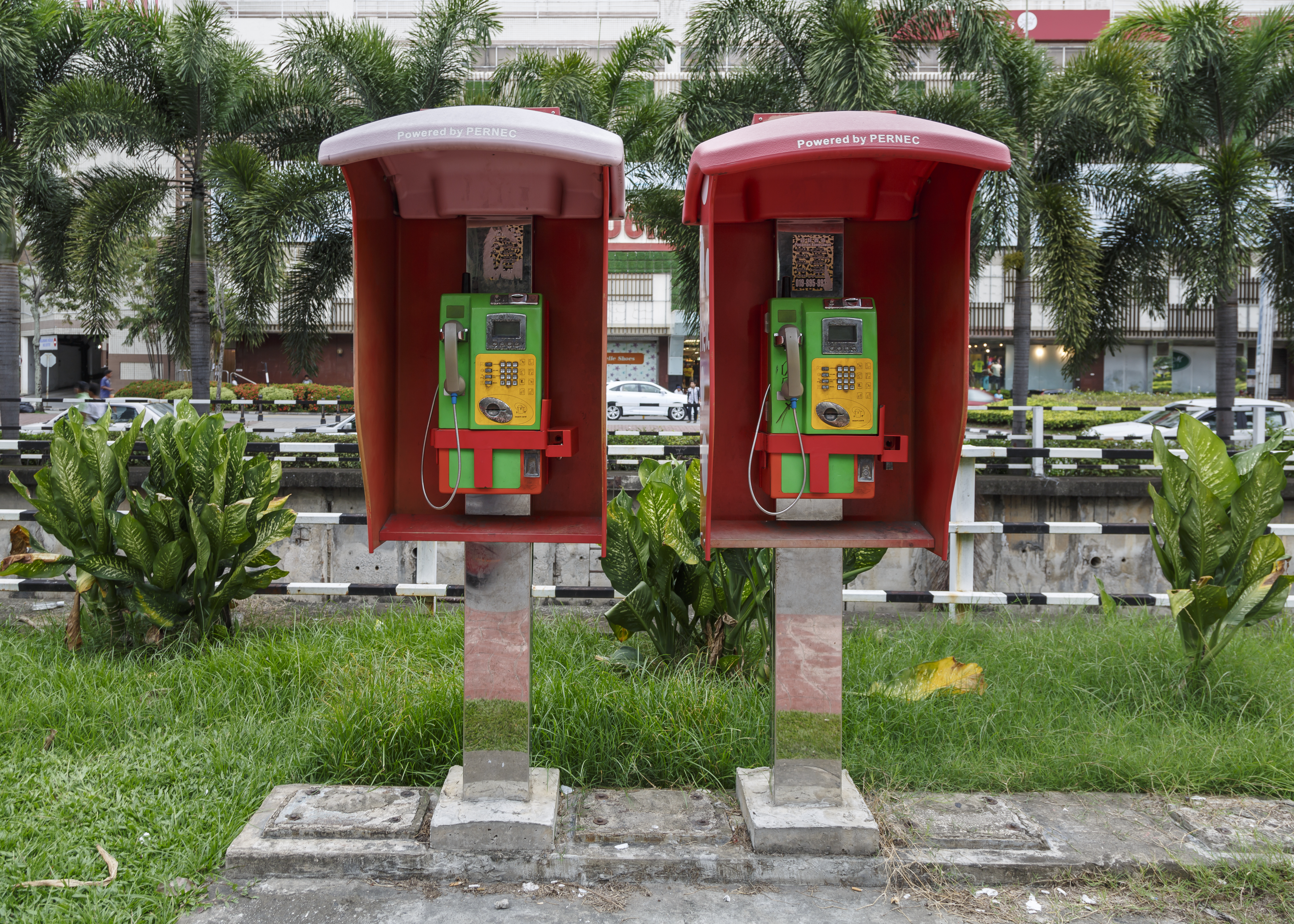
Phone boxes between Centre Point Shopping Mall and McDonalds, Kota Kinabalu, Sabah

This article is intended to give an overview of the history of telecommunications in Malaysia.

== The first telegraph line ==
The first telegraph line connecting to the British Resident at Perak House in Kuala Kangsar to the house of Deputy British Resident in Perak at Taiping, and was laid by the Department of Posts and Telegraph in 1874. This telegraph line measured 42.5 km and travelled across a forest at Bukit Berapit, and signalled the beginning of the era of telecommunications in Malaysia. However, during the Japanese occupation in World War II, the telegraph lines were nearly completely destroyed by the Japanese army.

== Evolution of telecommunications ==
- In 1967, the SEACOM cable line was introduced, connecting Peninsula Malaysia to Sarawak via the South China Sea.
- In 1983, the data telecommunications system was introduced.
- In 1985, ATUR, the first wireless telephone system was introduced by Jabatan Telekom Malaysia (JTM).
- In 1987, JTM was incorporated as Syarikat Telekom Malaysia Berhad (STMB) or Telekom Malaysia (TM) following the National Corporatization Policy, which was launched in the 1980s.
- In 1988, Celcom Sdn Bhd was founded under its name STM Cellular Communications Sdn Bhd. It was the first to provide GSM based mobile services.
- In 1997, Telekom Malaysia introduced CDMA based mobile homeline services.
- In 2003, Celcom Axiata Berhad (formerly Celcom Sdn Bhd) became the first provider to introduce video call based on 3G WCDMA technology.
- In 2008, Packet One Networks Sdn Bhd became the first provider to introduce Wireless WiMAX service on 802.16e spectrum technology.
- In October 2010, YTL Communications launch a nationwide WiMAX network offering mobile internet (IEEE 802.16m) subsequently in June 2016, YTL Communication launch its all 4G LTE network in 3GPP band 38 and band 40 to become the largest 4G network in the country
- In 2013, Maxis Berhad (formerly Maxis Sdn Bhd) became the first provider to introduce 4G LTE mobile network before any other service provider.

As of 2022, there are 5 licensed cellular operators in Malaysia: CelcomDigi, Maxis Communications, U Mobile, YTL Communications and unifi mobile (formerly known as webe digital).

== End of telegram services ==
In June 2012, Telekom Malaysia announced the discontinuation of telegram services with effect from 1 July 2012 after 138 years of service.
