= Jaring =

JARING Communications Sdn Bhd
- Type: State-owned enterprise
- Industry: Internet service provider
- Founded: 1992
- Defunct: 22 August 2015
- Headquarters: Technology Park Malaysia, Bukit Jalil, 57000 Kuala Lumpur, Malaysia
- Key people: Datuk Dr Md Khir Abdul Rahman (chairman); Datuk Norhisam Mohamed @ Mohamed Nor (CEO); Dr. Mohamad Awang Lah (CEO) - 2002 to 2010; Nik Abdul Aziz Nik Yaacob (CEO) - 2011 to 2012
- Products: Access Management, Business Solutions, Communications Services, Other Services
- Website: www.jaring.my

JARING (Jaring Communications Sdn Bhd) was a Malaysian Internet service provider based in Technology Park Malaysia (TPM). It was the first Internet service provider in the country and was formerly owned by MIMOS Berhad.

The word "JARING" was derived from "Joint Advanced Research Integrated Networking".

JARING underwent liquidation on 23 April 2015 and is no longer in business.

== History ==
JARING was Malaysia's first and pioneer Internet access service provider.

JARING was commercialised in 1992 after installing its first international satellite leased-circuit at 64kps, connecting Kuala Lumpur in Malaysia to Stockton in the United States. The circuit had then enabled JARING network users to be linked directly with Internet, including the BITNET and NSFNet.

In June 1997, JARING became the first Internet service provider (ISP) in South East Asia to install the T3 (45 Mbit/s) line, which provided JARING users with faster access to the Internet.

In 1999, JARING went a step further by introducing SuperJARING Internet backbone infrastructure with 2.5 Gigabits per second transmission speed, making it the fastest and longest (841 km) IP-over-fibre backbone service available in the world then.

The SuperJARING infrastructure that runs across Peninsular Malaysia from Kuala Lumpur through Ipoh, Penang, Kulim, Johor Bahru, Melaka and back to Kuala Lumpur has the capability to provide next-generation, bandwidth-intensive services like video-on-demand, secure virtual private networks (Secure VPNs), Internet telephony, Internet TV, distance learning and telemedicine.

As a pioneer in providing Internet access in Malaysia, JARING was committed in exploring new technologies and setting standards for others to follow in order to facilitate the creation of a knowledge-based society. Up until its closure, JARING had multiples of 622 Mbit/s links (STM4) to the global Internet, providing highly redundant circuits riding on the latest APCN-2, FLAG and PACNET submarine cable systems.

JARING Communications Sdn. Bhd. was later established as a spin-off company under MIMOS Berhad on 1 April 2005 and by December 2006, the Ministry of Finance, Malaysia, officially takes over JARING from MIMOS Berhad.

In 2008, JARING is first again to implement Internet telephone interconnect with traditional telephone services allowing Celcom subscribers to directly dial to JARING MY015 telephone subscribers. The Interconnect was later expanded to other telecommunications providers such as Maxis, Telekom Malaysia, TIME, Packet One and DiGi.

In February 2009, JARING was awarded "The International Customer Service Standard (TICSS)" Certification by the British Standards Institution (BSI), United Kingdom. JARING is the first telecommunication company in Malaysia and the Asia-Pacific to receive this award.

JARING had strategically committed its resources in embarking on an initiative to pursue the globally recognised certifications in Information Security Management System. On 20 July 2011, SIRIM QAS International formally awarded the ISO/IEC 27001 and ISO 9001 certifications for JARING Internet Data Centre, Virtual Private Network and System Operations.

On 1 January 2013, JARING becomes a private entity under Utusan Printcorp Sdn. Bhd. (UPSB) when the latter took over 100% of the withholding of the company from Ministry of Finance.

Up until its closure, it had ventured into expanding Malaysia's Internet experience by becoming among the first to provide high performance computing over the cloud, big data analysis, integrated solution for Internet of Things (IoT) and sentiment analytic for data processing.

JARING has finally closed and undergoes liquidation as of 23 April 2015.

== Milestones ==
JARING has distinctly positions itself to be firsts in the Internet industry and its evolving technologies and applications in Malaysia. Among JARING accomplishments are:

- 1992: Pioneered the Internet gateway in Malaysia establishing itself as the first Internet service provider (ISP).
- 1999: The launch of SuperJARING Internet backbone that runs from North to South of Peninsular Malaysia at a speed of 2.5 Gigabits per second, establishing it the first, fastest and longest (841 km) IP-over-fiber backbone service in the world at that time.
- 1999: JARING was the first ISP to be awarded the Cisco Powered Network Certification. This certification is recognized to be of international standard that identifies JARING as a reliable provider with a high-performance secured network.
- 2000: The first broadband Internet service based on IP-over-Optical Fibre was introduced and catered for business entities at 8 Mbit/s, 34 Mbit/s and 155 Mbit/s.
- 2001: The state-of-the art Multiprotocol Label Switching (MPLS) was offered for the first time to secure the performance of the Virtual Private Network (VPN).
- 2001–2003: Voted the best ISP under the Consumer Satisfaction Survey for three consecutive years by the Malaysian Communications and Multimedia Commission (MCMC).
- 2006: In December JARING Communications Sdn Bhd becomes another arm under the Ministry of Finance of Malaysia.
- 2014: High Growth Partner of the year by Southeast Asia and India Trend Micro Incorporated.
- 2014: Trend Micro Gold Partner by Southeast Asia and India Trend Micro Incorporated.
- 2015: JARING ceased operations.
