= List of Liga Super managers =

The Malaysia Super League is a professional football league in Malaysia which is at the top of the Malaysian football league system. The league was formed in 2004 as a replacement for the original First Division.

Up to 2021, most managers only work for few seasons with a team. The current managers in the Super League are:

As of 29 March 2021

Club	Name	Appointed
Melaka United	(Malaysia) Zainal Abidin Hassan	2018
Kuala Lumpur City	(Croatia) Bojan Hodak	2020
Johor Darul Ta'zim	(Mexico) Benjamin Mora	2019
Kedah Darul Aman	(Singapore) Aidil Sharin Sahak	2019
Sabah	(Indonesia) Kurniawan Dwi Yulianto	2020
Sri Pahang	(Malaysia) Dollah Salleh	2020
Penang	(Czech Republic) Tomas Trucha	2020
Petaling Jaya City	(Malaysia) P. Maniam	2020
Perak	(Malaysia) Chong Yee Fatt	2021
UiTM	(Germany) Frank Bernhardt	2020
Selangor	(Germany) Kartsen Neitzel	2020
Terengganu	(Malaysia) Nafuzi Zain	2019

== See also ==
- Malaysia Super League
