= National Broadband Initiative (Malaysia) =

Malaysian government programme for high-speed internet

Malaysia's National Broadband Initiative (Malay: Inisiatif Jalur Lebar Nasional) is a government programme designed to make high-speed Internet accessible and affordable to the country's citizens, with a special emphasis on rural areas, children and the poor. The public-private partnership, announced by Prime Minister Najib Tun Razak on March 24, 2010, combines the efforts of the Malaysian Communications and Multimedia Commission and Telekom Malaysia.

== High-speed broadband ==
As of early 2010, Malaysia has 16.9 million Internet users, 30.4 million cell phone users and 7.4 million 3G subscribers. According to MCMC chairman Khalid Ramli, 33.2 percent or 2.07 million Malaysian households had broadband as of the programme's launch. The Malaysian government's stated goal is to reach 50% broadband penetration, or about 3.2 million homes, by the conclusion of 2010. Efforts to achieve this goal include offering more government services online and providing an increased capacity for electronic commerce.

Malaysia's high-speed internet service, called HSBB, provides speeds between 5 and 20 megabits per second. Among the technologies used to deliver broadband services are fixed FTTH, VDSL2, wireless High Speed Packet Access and WiMAX, while officials have said that satellite technologies are also possible.

Deployment of HSBB services has been announced to occur in stages and divided into three zones. High economic impact areas such the Klang Valley are included in Zone 1, urban and semi-urban areas comprise Zone 2, while rural areas are in Zone 3. The areas of Taman Tun Dr Ismail, Shah Alam, Subang Jaya and Bangsar are the initial points of focus for the programme due to their importance to business and their high population density.

== 1Malaysia netbooks ==
As of 2010 RM1 billion has been budgeted to give impoverished students computers with internet access. Under the program most students will pay RM38 per month and students in rural areas will pay RM20 per month. Prime Minister Najib said funding for the programme will come from Malaysian Communications and Multimedia Commission's Universal Service Provision Fund. The government plans to distribute 1,000,000 computers through this program. As of August 2010 123,000 computers have been distributed under this program. 9,500 of these computers were distributed from 19 new community broadband centers in Sabah, one of Malaysia's poorest states. The Ministry of Information Communication and Culture has announced that the next phase of the program will distribute 877,000 units in order to fulfill Prime Minister Najib's pledge to deliver one million computers.

== Community internet centres ==
Prime Minister Najib announced that RM60 million will be invested to set up internet centres to benefit 615,000 households in 246 locations. “We are also setting up 138 Internet centres for the rakyat at state information department offices that will benefit 400,000 people,” he said. RM40 million will be spent to set up "e-kiosks" at community centres. 19 of these centres were set up in Sabah. The centres offer cheap internet access and computer training in order to facilitate improvements in agriculture, education, health and business.
