= Green Packet =

Green Packet Berhad
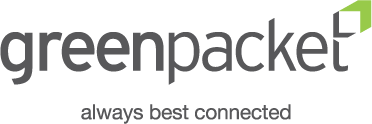
- Type: Public limited company
- Traded as: MYX: 0082
- ISIN: MYQ0082OO006
- Industry: Telecommunications
- Founded: 2000
- Headquarters: Petaling Jaya, Malaysia
- Key people: Omar Abdul Rahman, Chairman; CC Puan, CEO
- Products: Mobile data offloading, 4G devices, Wimax devices
- Number of employees: 800 (Worldwide)
- Website: https://greenpacket.com/

Green Packet is a technology company that was founded by Puan Chan Cheong in Cupertino, California in 2000. It began as a software solutions company, before expanding into the broadband sector.

== History ==
In 2000, Puan, a graduate of the University of Nebraska–Lincoln with a degree in business administration, founded Green Packet in 2000 and led it to its Main Market listing in 2005.

In August 2008, Green Packet created Packet One Networks, the first WiMAX service provider in Malaysia.

In 2007, Green Packet surpassed US$1 billion in market capitalization.

In 2024, four of the six investors initially expected to subscribe to the company’s private placement of over 598 million shares withdrew from the exercise.
