= Unifi Mobile =

Malaysian Telecommunications Company

- Trade name: TM Technology Services Sdn. Bhd. (2023–present)
- Formerly: MIB Comm Sendirian Berhad (2002–2006); Packet One Networks (Malaysia) Sendirian Berhad (2006–2016); Webe Digital Sdn. Bhd. (2016–2022)
- Type: Private limited company
- Industry: Telecommunications
- Predecessor: TM Net
- Founded: 11 February 2002; 24 years ago (as POne Networks)
- Founder: Puan Chan Cheong
- Products: Telecommunications service Internet services
- Brands: Unifi; Unifi TV
- Owner: Green Packet (2002–2014); Telekom Malaysia (2014–present)
- Number of employees: 600+ (2014)
- Website: www.unifi.com.my/mobile

Unifi Mobile is a Malaysian internet service provider and the country's sixth mobile network operator. Originally known as POne Networks (P1), the company was founded on 11 February 2002 and is a subsidiary of the national telephone company, Telekom Malaysia Berhad.

== Overview ==
Unifi Mobile operates 4G WiMAX, 4G LTE, and 4G LTE-A networks and provides domestic roaming with 4G Maxis and 2G EDGE networks.

In March 2007, P1 was one of four companies awarded 2.3 GHz spectrum licences by the Malaysian government to deploy 4G WiMAX services throughout Malaysia. In August 2008, it became the first company to launch commercial WiMAX services in Malaysia.

In March 2014, Telekom Malaysia (TM) bought a 57% stake in P1 for RM350 million and planned to invest RM1 billion over the next four years.

In April 2016, the company was officially rebranded as Webe Digital Sdn. Bhd. May 2017 saw the announcement of the company's latest CEO, Moharmustaqeem Mohammed, replacing Azizi A. Hady.

In January 2018, TM relaunched its mobile service under the brand Unifi Mobile. Unifi Mobile is a prepaid and postpaid plan operating on an annual contract. The Unifi Mobile LTE network consists of 850 MHz FDD-LTE (Band 5), 2300 MHz TD-LTE (Band 40), and TD-LTE 2600 MHz (Band 38). Unifi Mobile utilizes its MgO 850 MHz LTE band 5 spectrum (reformed from CDMA 850 MHz), and Celcom provided domestic roaming on 4G and 2G until June 2023.

On 1 October 2022, Jasmine Lee Sze Inn was appointed the new Executive Vice President of Mobile at Telekom Malaysia Bhd and CEO of Webe, the mobile division of TM.

On 14 December 2022, Telekom Malaysia Bhd announced the reorganisation and renaming of Webe Digital Sdn Bhd to TM Technology Services Sdn Bhd, which later took place on 1 March 2023.

Frequencies used on Unifi Mobile Network in Malaysia
Band	Frequency	Frequency width	Protocol	Notes
5	850 MHz (824~834, 869~879)	2 * 10 MHz	LTE	until December 2027
40	2300 MHz (2360~2390)	30 MHz	LTE/WiMAX	20 + 10 MHz Carrier aggregation (CA)
38	2600 MHz (2575~2595)	20 MHz	LTE	until June 2027

- Used Celcom 2.6 GHz (Band 7) for some in-building coverage from 2016 to 2023. Unifi started to use Maxis at approximately 6,800 sites for 4G Multi Operator Core Network (MOCN) domestic roaming from mid 2023.
- Used Celcom 2G network from 2016 to 2023. Unifi started to use Maxis at 10,000 sites for 2G Multi Operator Core Network (MOCN) domestic roaming from mid 2023.

== Milestones ==
- Alcatel-Lucent – January 2008
- Intel Corporation – May 2008
- Oracle Corporation – May 2008
- EMC Corporation – June 2008
- Fiberail – June 2008
- ZTE China – March 2009
- SK Telecom announced a strategic alliance with P1, in which SK Telecom acquired approximately 25% stake in P1 – June 2010
- Qualcomm – June 2011
- China Mobile – June 2011
- Telekom Malaysia – October 2011
- Celcom – January 2016
- Celcom – March 2019
- Maxis – June 2023
- Packet One was discontinued as a company after Telekom Malaysia's purchase. Its W1MAX product offering still exists, though it now focuses on LTE as web.

== Prefix and Subscriber Numbers ==
Assigned by the Malaysian Communications and Multimedia Commission:

- Prefix: 10 | Subscriber numbers: 350 0000 - 359 9999
- Prefix: 10 | Subscriber numbers: 440 0000 - 459 9999
- Prefix: 10 | Subscriber numbers: 550 0000 - 559 9999
- Prefix: 10 | Subscriber numbers: 650 0000 - 659 9999
- Prefix: 11 | Subscriber numbers: 1000 0000 - 1049 9999
- Prefix: 11 | Subscriber numbers: 1800 0000 - 1849 9999
