= TM Net =

Malaysian Internet service provider

- Type: Public Limited
- Industry: Internet service provider
- Founded: 1995
- Headquarters: TM IT Complex,3300 Lingkaran Usahawan 1 Timur Cyberjaya, 63000, Cyberjaya, Malaysia
- Area served: Malaysia
- Key people: Jeremy Kung (CEO); Fazlur Rahman Zainuddin (CFO) Dato Nazri Abdullah.
- Products: HyppTV
- Services: Internet service provider
- Number of employees: 1976 employees
- Parent: Telekom Malaysia
- Website: tmnet.com.my

TM Net is an Internet service provider in Malaysia. As of 2009, it was the only fixed line broadband provider in Malaysia It also provides Internet Protocol television and other multimedia services. TM Net is a wholly owned subsidiary of Malaysia's main telecommunication provider, TM Bhd.

TM Net was established in 1995 by Telekom Malaysia as part of Malaysia National Broadband Plan. On 1 November 1996, TM Net launched its dial up service under short code 1515, as the second national ISP. TMNET has been serving its customer for more than 20 years. On 10 August 2017, TM discontinued its Dial-Up and ISDN services.

DSL was initially deployed on a trial basis. The first commercial trial of ADSL by TM was done through a service known as HiS that was deployed together with Ericsson in 1999.

The original Streamyx broadband service was launched in April 2001 at the speed of 384 kbit/s has been discontinued. In June 2007, TM Net launched its 4 Mbit/s service at selected locations. On 8 January 2013, TM Net launched its 8 Mbit/s service at selected locations and extended the IPTV services HyppTV to Streamyx customers.

On 24 March 2010, TM launched its fiber optic broadband service, Unifi.

== See also ==
- HyppTV
