= Digital Nasional =

Malaysian special-purpose vehicle company

Digital Nasional Berhad
- Industry: Telecommunications
- Founded: 23 February 2017; 9 years ago
- Founder: Johari Abdul Ghani
- Headquarters: Level 12, Exchange 106 Lingkaran TRX, Tun Razak Exchange, 55188 Kuala Lumpur, Malaysia
- Owners: CelcomDigi (33.3%); YTL (33.3%); Maxis (33.3%)
- Website: www.digital-nasional.com.my

Digital Nasional Berhad (DNB; English: National Digital Limited) is a Malaysian special-purpose vehicle company which is owned by CelcomDigi, Maxis, and YTL and is regulated by the Malaysian Communications and Multimedia Commission. DNB was established in early March 2021 by the Malaysian Government to drive the development of the 5G (fifth-generation) infrastructure in Malaysia. It now serves both CelcomDigi, Maxis and YTL's 5G users along with selling wholesale access to other telecommunication companies.

The first rollout of the 5G services in Malaysia was launched on 15 December 2021, with TM and YTL as its operators upon rollout.

On October 7, 2022, four major telcos took up 65% in shares of DNB, with the remaining 35% held by the government with a golden share. The four major telcos with their respective stakes in DNB were TM (20%), YTL (20%), Digi (12.5%), and Celcom (12.5%), which was subsequently merged with Digi to form CelcomDigi on 1 December 2022.

On August 23, 2024, DNB issued a termination notice to TM regarding its Share Subscription Agreement (SSA). The deal was cancelled because TM failed to obtain shareholder approval by the August 21 deadline. Consequently, TM did not become an equity partner in DNB at that time. Despite the termination of the equity deal, TM clarified that its 5G wholesale agreement with DNB remained intact, ensuring no disruption to 5G services for Unifi Mobile customers. This exit left CelcomDigi, Maxis, U Mobile, and YTL as the four remaining mobile network operators (MNOs) holding equity in DNB during that period.

On May 14, 2025, U Mobile exited its shareholding in DNB to focus on its role as the operator of Malaysia's second 5G network. U Mobile sold its entire stake of 100,000 shares for a nominal sum of RM100,000. These shares were distributed among the remaining stakeholders: CelcomDigi, Maxis, and YTL each acquired 33,333 shares, while the Ministry of Finance (MOF) acquired the final remaining share.

On March 6, 2026, Digital Nasional Berhad (DNB) moved toward full privatization as major telecommunications operators CelcomDigi, YTL and Maxis completed the acquisition of the Malaysian Ministry of Finance's (MOF) remaining stake. All Three telcos paid approximately RM327.9 million (US$82.7 million) each to exercise a put option issued by the MOF. This followed the exit of U Mobile from DNB's shareholder structure to lead Malaysia's second 5G network. The transaction effectively transferred the government’s ownership and DNB's debt load to the remaining private mobile network operators (MNOs).

== Deployment of 5G ==
DNB had announced that it would launch and rollout the country's first 5G network with a total of 500 sites in areas within Kuala Lumpur, Putrajaya and Cyberjaya by the end of December 2021 which is expected provide about 10% population coverage. The Malaysian government had also appointed Ericsson as the sole network equipment provider at a cost of RM4 billion as well as to build the infrastructure estimated at a cost of RM11 billion.

Digital Nasional chief executive officer, Augustus Ralph Marshall, said that the country's first 5G base station installation at Bukit Tunku has been powered on which aims to deliver 500 5G-enabled sites in Kuala Lumpur, Cyberjaya and Putrajaya upon rollout.

Frequencies used on DNB network in Malaysia
Band	Frequency	Frequency width	Protocol	Notes
28	700 MHz (703-723, 758-778)	2 x 20 MHz	LTE/5G NR DSS	LTE for NSA 5G anchor
78	3.5 GHz (3300~3400 MHz) (3400~3500 MHz)	200 MHz	5G NR	
257	28 GHz	1600Mhz	5G NR	No major deployment of mmWave from DNB as of Oct 26

It has also planned to deploy 5G in major cities and districts in Johor, Penang, Selangor and Sabah in 2022. As at May 31, 2023, the rollout of the 5G network had achieved 62.1% coverage of populated areas involving 5,058 5G sites, with the aim of achieving 80% coverage of populated areas nationwide by the end year 2023. On 17 December 2024, it was reported that the 5G adoption rate has reached 52% nationwide as compared to 10.8% in October 2023.

== Contract Disputes ==
In early 2026, a significant contractual dispute emerged between TM and DNB regarding the early termination of their 5G Wholesale Network Access Agreement. On February 25, 2026, TM announced it had signed a three-year wholesale contract with U Mobile to utilize Malaysia’s second 5G network, citing its contractual right to exit the DNB agreement once a second provider became commercially available. However, on March 3, 2026, DNB formally rejected TM's termination notice, asserting that TM had failed to meet the specific "long-term arrangement" conditions required for an early exit. DNB maintains that the original agreement remains valid and enforceable until October 2032. While the Malaysian government has categorized the disagreement as a commercial matter to be resolved between the two licensees, TM has upheld its decision following a legal review, and both parties have committed to ensuring no service disruption for Unifi Mobile users during the resolution process.

== Criticisms ==
DNB faces criticism from a number of individuals. These individuals want the government to also allow a competing provider, if not switch to a telco alliance-based deployment model as used in Singapore, a sentiment shared by a number of telcos operating in the country. Initially, only two companies- YTL's YES and TM's UniFi Mobile- have agreed to the DNB's term, while the others have publicly protested the plan. Additionally, the network will not allow all 5G phones and will only allow connection from "tested and authorized" handsets. This has raised concerns with early adopters of 5G phones as the network is, as of 2023, blocking all Sony handsets as well as older Asus, Samsung and iPhone 5G handsets, as well as lesser known handsets like the TickTock from Unihertz, but on the other hand most Chinese-made phones like Oppo, ZTE and Huawei are allowed onto the network unimpeded.

In December 2022, newly appointed Malaysian Prime Minister Anwar Ibrahim said his administration would review the plan for DNB's 5G network introduced by his predecessor, and on September 27, 2023, he said that the government would allow a second 5G network and shift from a Single Wholesale Network to a Dual Network model to break the monopoly held by DNB.

As of 2024, the company has relaxed its stance on approved devices and began allowing more 5G devices onto the network. Additionally, all telcos are now on board after the government announced that telcos are now allowed to buy a stake in the company. However, the plan for a second 5G network is still on the table.
