= U Mobile =

Malaysian mobile telecommunications service provider

- Trade name: U Mobile Sdn. Bhd. (since 2008); High Mobile Networks Sdn. Bhd. (to be announced)
- Type: Private limited company
- Industry: Mobile telecommunications
- Founded: 29 August 1991; 35 years ago (as MiTV Networks)
- Founder: Tan Sri Vincent Tan
- Headquarters: Berjaya Times Square, Kuala Lumpur, Malaysia
- Key people: Wong Heang Tuck (CEO)
- Products: Mobile telephony; Broadband internet
- Services: Cellular, fixed line and MIDI (Multimedia Data Internet)
- Owner: Vincent Tan (41.3 via Berjaya Corporation and Mawar Setia) (sale to NTT Docomo pending); Ibrahim Iskandar of Johor (15%); Aminah Maimunah Iskandar of Johor (8.7% via Mawar Setia)
- Number of employees: 700+
- Parent: Magnum Berhad (20%); U Mobile Holdings Berhad (21%) (merger to Maxis/stc Group pending); MPHB Capital Berhad (6%); ST Telemedia (52%)
- Capital ratio: Maxis; U Mobile
- Website: www.u.com.my

U Mobile (formerly known as Grafimatix Sendirian Berhad, and then MiTV Networks Sendirian Berhad, registered as High Mobile Networks Sdn. Bhd.), company number 199101013657 (223969-U), is a Malaysian mobile telecommunications service provider and was founded in 29 August 1991 as MiTV Networks, which was formerly known as Multimedia Interactive TeleVision (often referred to as MiTV). U Mobile is a wholly owned subsidiary of U Mobile Holdings Berhad.

The company utilises the 018 and 011 prefix allocated to the organisation by the Malaysian Communications and Multimedia Commission (MCMC), although with the implementation of mobile number portability mandated by the Malaysian government this does apply to subscribers who switched from their old mobile service provider over to U Mobile.

As of January 2023, U Mobile has 8.5 million subscribers. U mobile subscribers has cross the 9 million mark by end of 2023.

== Products and services ==
=== Postpaid ===
==== U Postpaid ====
U Postpaid is a 5G plan that was introduced to replace the Unlimited Hero Postpaid. There are three types: U Postpaid 38, U Postpaid 68 and U Postpaid 98. U Postpaid 38 has been upgraded to 120 GB of data from 60 GB of data, while U Postpaid 68 and 98 are having 500 GB and 1 TB of data separately. All U Postpaid plans come with unlimited calls and Ultra Hotspot 5G. Besides, U Postpaid 68 and 98 are equipped with free 15 GB roaming data and calls, which can be used in over 63 countries.

==== Unlimited Hero Postpaid ====
Unlimited Hero Postpaid is an old postpaid plan from U Mobile and there are three plans: P79, P99 and P139. P79 has a 20 GB of all-usage data, and comes with multiple add-ons, including video, music, chat and Waze for unlimited uses. P99 and P139 both come with unlimited high-speed data with a total of 30 GB and 50 GB hotspot data separately. Three plans are having unlimited calls and 3 GB roaming data, which can be used in over 12 Asian countries, except for P79 having 1 GB roaming data. P139 users also gotten a free upgrade on 11 Sep 2022 to access to 5G data for free.

==== Giler Unlimited Postpaid (GX) ====
GX Postpaid is a cheaper postpaid plan with two types: GX50 and GX68. Both plans come with unlimited data and calls, with a 5 GB hotspot. GX50 has a speed cap of 5 Mbps, while GX68 has no speed cap, but none of them can connect to 5G network.

=== Prepaid ===
==== U Prepaid ====
U Prepaid are alike to U Postpaid, since both of them are 5G plans. U Prepaid has three plans: Prepaid U25, Prepaid U35 and Prepaid U40. All three U Prepaid plans come with unlimited data and calls, with FUP. U25 has a FUP of 30 GB, while U35 and U40 have a FUP of 100 GB, data usage after FUP limits will be reduced to 512 kbps. U25 has a data speed of 3 Mbps, and U35 and U40 have a data speed of 6 Mbps. U25 has no hotspot, U35 has a 3 GB of hotspot and U40 has a 3 GB of hotspot with a hotspot limit sharing from the data. U25 users can access to 5G network an hour per day, and U35 and U40 users can access to 5G network every weekend.

==== Giler Unlimited Prepaid (GX) ====
GX Prepaid is U Mobile's old prepaid plan, with four types: GX12, GX30, GX38 and GX43. GX12 is on a weekly-basis, with unlimited internet and calls. GX30, GX38 and GX43 are monthly plans, with 6 Mbps and 12 Mbps unlimited data and 6 GB hotspot, the only difference is GX38 and GX43 has unlimited calls.

== Networks ==
U Mobile operate 4G LTE and 4G LTE-A networks.

As of 2015, U Mobile claimed to have 95% population coverage from a combination of over 10,000 sites of 3G and 4G LTE own-built, 3G RAN share and 2G Domestic Roaming with Maxis. U mobile 2g domestic roaming is currently running on Celcom network since 2019.

3G RAN share was previously in collaboration with Maxis Communications since October 2011 but ended on 27 October 2018, due to U Mobile being awarded additional spectrum of 2x15MHz of 1800 MHz bands and 2x5MHz of 900 MHz bands in 2016.

Frequencies used on U Mobile Network in Malaysia
Band	Frequency	Frequency Width	Protocol	Notes
8	900 MHz (900~905, 945~950)	2 * 5 MHz	LTE	(expiry June 2032)
3	1800 MHz (1730~1745, 1825~1840)	2 * 15 MHz	LTE / LTE-A	(expiry June 2032)
1	2100 MHz (1920~1935, 2110~2125) (1915~1920)	2 * 15 MHz 5 MHz	LTE	(expiry April 2034)
7	2600 MHz (2520~2530, 2640~2650)	2 * 10 MHz	LTE / LTE-A	
Malaysia's second 5G network
28	700 MHz (723~743, 778~798)	2 * 20 MHz	LTE	NSA 5G anchoring with band 77/78
77/78	3500 MHz (3500~3600 MHz)	100 MHz	5G NR	

=== 5G Networks ===
U Mobile users can now access to DNB's 5G network with selected prepaid and postpaid plans. On 22 May 2023, Communications and Digital Minister Fahmi Fadzil revealed that Malaysia’s 5G coverage has reached almost 60% of populated areas in the country, standing at 59.5% as of the end of April. This means that the government’s goal of reaching 80% coverage in populated areas by end 2023 is closer to being attained.

On September 1 2024, U Mobile announced that they have been given the light by the Malaysian Communications and Multimedia Commission MCMC to deploy the second 5G network in Malaysia.

== Corporate history ==
In April 2007, MiTV Corporation Sendirian Berhad (registered as Ansat Broadcast Sdn. Bhd.) signed the country's first nationwide domestic roaming memorandum of understanding, which led to an agreement with the mobile network operator Celcom (Malaysia) Berhad allowing U Mobile's customers nationwide coverage while U Mobile rolled out its own high-speed mobile 3G service nationwide. The agreement was completed in June 2007.

In December 2007, the 3G communications operators KT Freetel and NTT DoCoMo jointly invested US$200 million (est. RM669 million) for a total of 33% stake in U Mobile.

In March 2008, U Mobile launched its first publicly available product called "Surf with U", a data-only plan for mobile users provided using U Mobile's HSDPA-driven mobile network. The following month, it rolled out its first mobile service, the postpaid U38 plan. In July, U Mobile launched two new postpaid services, U68 and U98, and the 018 Prepaid service.

In 2009, KT Freetel, one of U Mobile's foreign investors, sold its 16.5% stake (62.6 million shares) to U Mobile's major shareholder.

In November 2012, U Mobile activated 3G RAN Sharing with Maxis and transitioned its 2G network provider from Celcom to Maxis.

On 31 August 2013, U Mobile announced that En. Jaffa Sany Bin Md Ariffin has been terminated as the chief executive officer and ceased to be an employee of U Mobile due to disciplinary action. Accordingly, he is not authorised to act for and on behalf of the company in respect of any matter with immediate effect. He was appointed as chief executive officer of U Mobile on 1 June 2012.

On 17 December 2013, U Mobile launched its LTE network on the 2600 MHz band that covers the Klang Valley. U Mobile has currently about 2 million subscribers at the end of 2014.

On 1 April 2014, U Mobile announced the appointment of Wong Heang Tuck as chief executive officer (CEO) effective 1 April 2014, Jasmine Lee as chief marketing officer (CMO), and Alex Tan as chief sales officer (CSO) effective 1 January 2014

On 21 December 2015, U Mobile announced that D.Y.M.M. Sultan Ibrahim Ismail Ibni Almarhum Sultan Iskandar Al-Haj (“DYMM Sultan Ibrahim”) has acquired a further 5% stake in the company to increase his stake to 15%. DYMM Sultan Ibrahim acquired his initial 10% stake in U Mobile in 2014.

In February 2016, U Mobile confirms that it has been allocated with 15 years spectrum assignment of 2x5MHz of 900 MHz and 2x15MHz of 1800 MHz for full nationwide implementation starting 1 January 2017.

In March 2016, U Mobile announced that it has partnered with Football Malaysia Limited Liability Partnership (FMLLP) to be the Official Co-Sponsor of the Superbest Power Piala FA and Liga Premier Malaysia for three years, starting from the 2016 season. U Mobile will be the Exclusive Telecommunications Partner for the two premier football competitions. The partnership with FMLLP will give U Mobile marketing, promotion and engagement opportunities around the two competitions, in-stadium branding, corporate hospitality and use of the club and player image rights for advertising purposes.

On 26 May 2016, U Mobile become the first carrier in Malaysia to support Wi-Fi calling, initially only supporting iPhone owners owning iPhone 5c or later running iOS 9.3 and above. Wi-Fi calling for Android users are only supported on selected devices.

In August 2016, U Mobile launched its first 4G LTE Advanced network at Kota Belud, Sabah.

On 28 June 2017, U Mobile is terminating its 3G network sharing and alliance agreement with Maxis Berhad which was signed in 2011. Maxis said on Wednesday the termination would take place in stages over 18 months and the completion date is on 27 December 2018.

== Stakeholders ==
As of September 1 2024, based on the information from Companies Commission of Malaysia, the major shareholder of U Mobile Holdings Berhad includes Straits Mobile Investments Pte. Ltd. (48.25%), followed by DYMM Sultan Ibrahim (22.30%), Magnum Berhad (7.83%), Singer (Malaysia) Sdn. Bhd. (6.09%), Berjaya Corporation Berhad (5.59%) sale to NTT Docomo, Inc.), and merger to Maxis Berhad, (owned by Saudi Telecom Company) pending, Tan Sri Koon Poh Keong (2.35%), Singapore Technologies Telemedia Pte. Ltd. (0.52%) and remaining shareholders (7.65%).

== Partners ==
U Mobile's partners include:

- Atos Origin: Integrator of the BSCS iX Release 2 Billing System.
- Ericsson: High-Speed Packet Access (HSPA) solutions and management provider.
- Huawei: Telecommunication equipment provider, from access layers to core transmissions.
- LHS: Supplier of the BSCS iX Release 2 Billing System.
- Nokia Siemens Networks: Implementation, integration, and application development of DVB-H services, including the maintenance of MiTV's infrastructure on a turnkey basis.
- Rohde & Schwarz Malaysia: Supplier of low, medium and high powered digital television transmitters for the rollout implementation and coverage expansion of U Mobile's Mobile LiveTV.
- Telekom Malaysia: Provisioning of backhaul connectivity services through TM Next-Gen Backhaul (NGBH) services.
- ZTE: Telecommunication equipment provider.
- Whale Cloud: Cloud BSS solution Provider.

== See also ==
- Maxis Tower
- Maxis
