= Unifi TV =

Malaysian online television service

- Logo used since 2023
- Product type: IPTV; OTT service; Mobile TV
- Current owner: Telekom Malaysia
- Country: Malaysia
- Introduced: 22 March 2010; 16 years ago (as hyppTV)
- Related brands: TM Global; TM One; Unifi; Unifi Mobile
- Markets: Malaysia
- Website: unifi.com.my/tv

Unifi TV (formerly known as hyppTV, stylized as unifi TV prior to January 2018) is an IPTV service operated by Unifi, a Malaysian internet service provider owned by Telekom Malaysia (TM). It was launched in 2010 as part of Unifi's bundled service offering of VoIP telephone, Internet and IPTV.

== History ==
hyppTV logo (2010–2018)

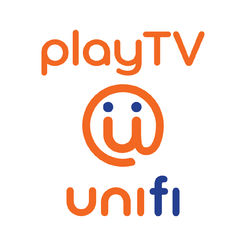
unifi playTV logo (2018–2023)

An early version of hyppTV, running through TM's Streamyx broadband service and confined to the Klang Valley, launched in September 2004. The service officially launched on 22 March 2010, providing about 20 channels and 200 hours of movies and TV series available via video-on-demand (VOD). Later that year, a premium offering was introduced which provided additional channels and VOD content. The service expanded steadily following its initial launch, from 16,000 residential customers in 2010 to 750,000 in 2016.

In November 2012, TM began offering hyppTV to its business customers "as one of Unifi Biz's Value Added Services", including two bundled packages, the Fox Package and Star Chinese Package.

On 12 January 2018, hyppTV and hyppTV Everywhere were rebranded to unifi TV and unifi playTV respectively.

In January 2019, TM temporarily stopped offering free Unifi TV set-top boxes for new Unifi Home and broadband customers, instead providing free access to Unifi playTV, citing an increase in content consumption on mobile devices as well as the rising trend of OTT streaming. As a consequence, many new Unifi TV users were unable to use functions the Unifi TV set-top box offered, such as improved visual quality, the ability to view channels exclusive to the set-top box (including the majority of now-defunct channels from The Walt Disney Company Asia Pacific), joining contests and using TV apps.

On 15 January 2020, Unifi TV launched the unifi Plus Box, a new streaming device running Android TV. The box was manufactured by Chinese company Skyworth, and introduced new features such as the delivery of 4K content through the Unifi TV app. As of 2025, it includes third-party streaming apps including HBO Max, Netflix, Amazon Prime Video, WeTV iflix, TVB Anywhere+, Mango TV, Youku, iQIYI, Vidio, BBC Player, ZEE5, Sun NXT, YuppTV, and Viu. Subscribers to Unifi TV's "Ultimate Pack" also have access to Disney+ Hotstar (now Disney+), SPOTV NOW and beIN Sports Connect. Later that year, the Unifi TV app was updated to support several other Android TV devices (including Pensonic, TCL, Sony, Panasonic, Philips, Sharp, Toshiba, Hisense, Xiaomi and Haier Android TV models), eliminating the need for the Plus Box in many cases.

== Services ==
The service is being offered to residential and business customers in Malaysia over an optical fiber network via Fiber to the Home (FTTH) for landed properties and VDSL2 for high-rise properties.

== See also ==
- Television in Malaysia
- Digital television in Malaysia
