= Unifi (internet service provider) =

Malaysian telecommunication service

- Logo used since 2023
- Product type: Telecommunications
- Current owner: Telekom Malaysia
- Produced by: Puan Chan Cheong
- Country: Malaysia
- Introduced: 24 March 2010; 16 years ago
- Related brands: TM Global; TM One; Unifi TV; Unifi Mobile
- Markets: Nationwide
- Previous owners: Green Packet
- Website: unifi.com.my

Unifi (stylized in all-lowercase as unifi) is a service by Telekom Malaysia, offering Internet access, VoIP and IPTV to residential and business customers in Malaysia through an optical fiber network via Fiber to the Home (FTTH) for individual housing units and VDSL2 for high-rise buildings.

Formerly called the VIP (Voice, Internet, Phone) plan, the residential package was renamed as Advance plan, Pro plan, and Lite plan, which provides video or IP television, internet access, and phone service.
