= YTL Communications =

Malaysian telecommunications company

Yes
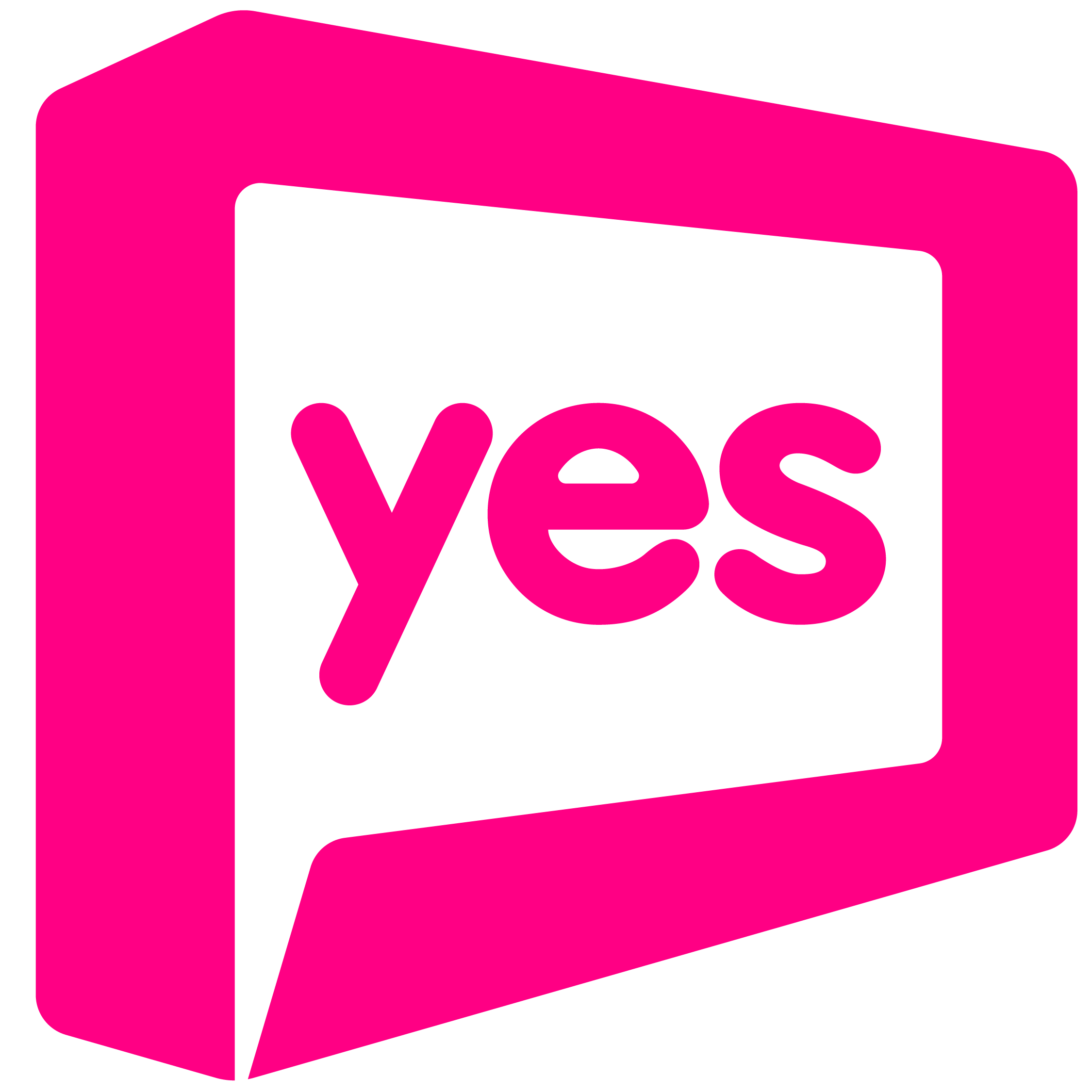
- Type: Subsidiary
- Industry: Internet and telecommunications
- Founded: 19 November 2010; 15 years ago
- Founder: Yeoh Tiong Lay
- Headquarters: Kuala Lumpur, Malaysia
- Key people: Wing K. Lee (CEO); Behnam Neekzad (CTO)
- Products: 4G Mobile Broadband products & services 4G Mobile Internet products & services VoLTE (Voice over LTE) service 5G
- Parent: YTL Corporation
- Website: www.yes.my

YTL Communications Sdn. Bhd. dba Yes is a mobile network operator in Malaysia, the fifth in the country overall. Headquartered in Kuala Lumpur, Malaysia, YTL Communications is a subsidiary of the utilities company YTL Power International Berhad and serves as the communications arm of YTL Corporation Berhad, an infrastructure conglomerate in Malaysia. Yes uses the native dialling prefix identifier of 018 and 011-1.

== Network and coverage ==
=== 4G LTE ===
Yes 4G operates 4G LTE and 4G LTE-A networks.

The Yes network is built from the ground up with an all-IP architecture, making it the first and only all-4G and all-IP network provider in Malaysia capable of offering unique services such as user ID-based unified communications as well as session concurrency for mobile data and telephony services.

Yes owns and operates its own network infrastructure in Malaysia. Yes has close to 5,000 base stations across the country with an all-4G network footprint reaching over 85% population coverage nationwide.

WiMAX networks were discontinued on 1 October 2019.

It is also the first in Malaysia to provide nationwide VoLTE (Voice over LTE), available for Android VoLTE-supported smartphones.

Frequencies used on Yes 4G Network in Malaysia
Band	Frequency	Frequency Width	Protocol	Notes
20	800 MHz (798~803, 839~844)	2 x 5 MHz	LTE / LTE-A	
40	2300 MHz (2330~2360)	30 MHz	LTE / LTE-A	
38	2600 MHz (2595~2615)	20 MHz	LTE / LTE-A	B41 is also enabled via MFBI on certain sites.

=== 5G ===
In December 2021, Yes is one of the first operators (along with unifi Mobile) to roll out 5G pilot test for consumers in Malaysia, branded as Yes FT5G. The backbone of Yes's 5G service is powered by Digital Nasional Berhad, and it's currently available in Kuala Lumpur, Putrajaya and Cyberjaya.

In May 26 2022, Yes launched the Infinite plans, bringing Malaysia to the world map for providing the most economical data usage plans. The event was graced by the MCMC Minister, Tan Sri Datuk Seri Panglima Haji Annuar Musa at Majestic Hotel Kuala Lumpur. Major device manufacturers (Samsung, Xiaomi, Oppo and Vivo) are also backing Yes in collaboration to sell Yes Infinite+ plans with their devices. Yes Infinite plans have no tonnage capping, no speed capping and no bill shocks, the only capping is on the plan monthly fee. A free 5G device is included if subscribers opt for the contract.

== Services to the education sector ==
Yes has worked closely with the Malaysian Ministry of Education to equip all 10,000 primary and secondary national schools across the country with high-speed 4G Internet connectivity integrated with cloud-based Frog VLE (Virtual Learning Environment) platform under the 1BestariNet program.

Under Yes' own Education Partner Programme (EPP), it entered into strategic partnerships with selected public colleges and universities within Malaysia to furnish the entire campus grounds and buildings with high-speed 4G Internet connectivity and free data to access the Internet for educational purposes.

== History ==
Yes was officially launched on 19 November 2010 in Kuala Lumpur, Malaysia and was the first in the world to commercially launch a converged 4G network at a national scale based on IEEE Broadband Wireless Access Standards (WiMAX). At launch, it boasted 65% nationwide population coverage and was the largest 4G network in Malaysia.

Yes first started out with a prepaid service, charging 9 sen for 3MB of data, or an SMS or a minute of voice call which was compatible with its 4G devices namely Yes Go USB dongle and Yes Huddle mobile hotspot device. A postpaid version of the Yes plan service called Super Postpaid Plan was launched in 2012. Yes also introduced several 4G smartphones, including Yes Buzz, Yes Altitude and Yes Eclipse.

Awarded with 80 MHz of the 4G spectrum, Yes officially launched its 4G LTE services including VoLTE on 30 June 2016.

Yes announced in January 2018 that its nationwide network fully supports 4G+ or LTE-Advanced.
