= Malaysian Communications and Multimedia Commission =

Malaysian Government agency

- Suruhanjaya Komunikasi dan Multimedia Malaysia (SKMM / MCMC)
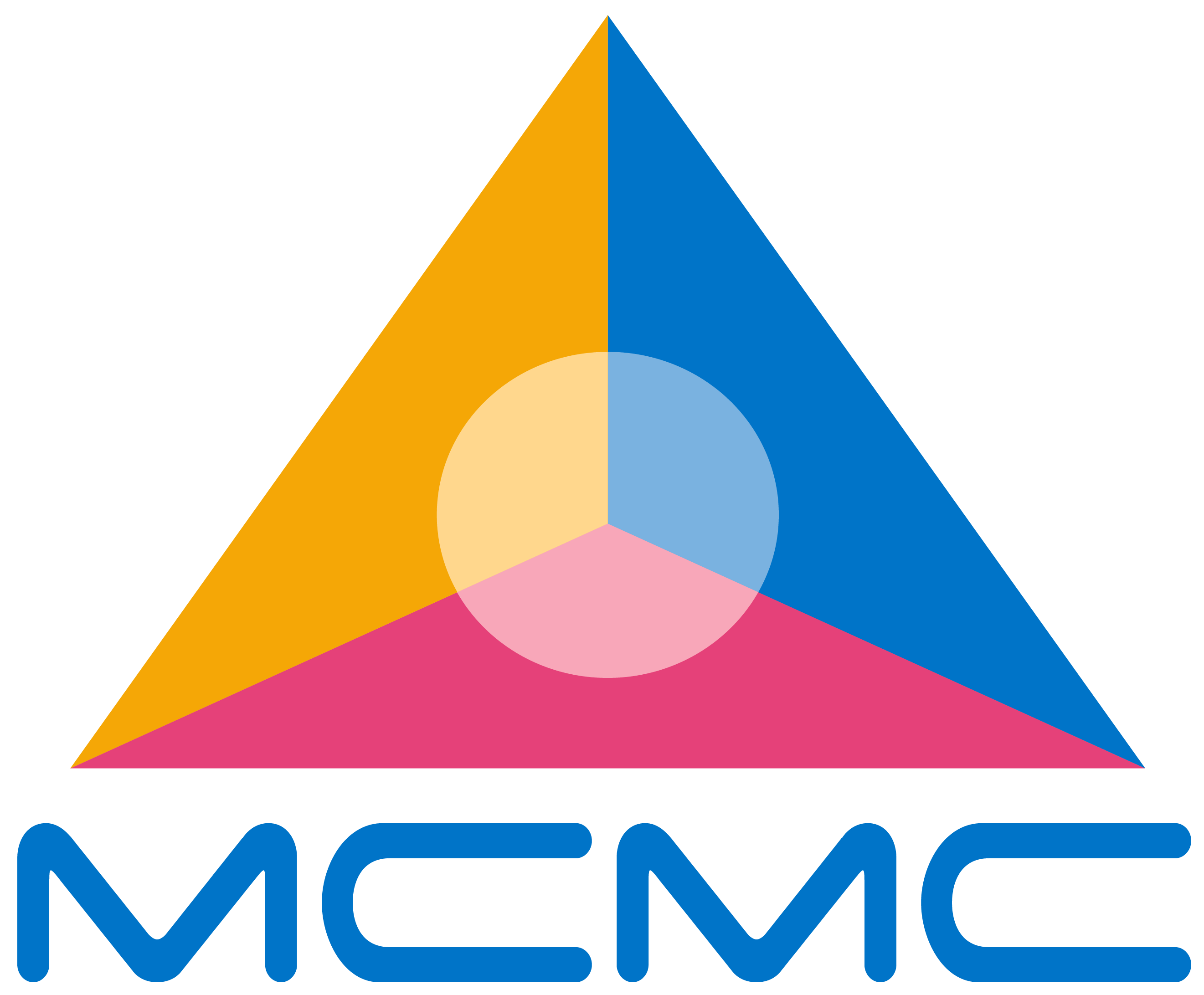
- MCMC logo used since 2014. The logo is the same, but the SKMM acronym was removed. The logo pictured is the 2020 version without the horizontal line.

Agency overview
- Formed: 1 November 1998; 27 years ago
- Preceding agency: Malaysian Telecom Department (Jabatan Telekom Malaysia)
- Headquarters: MCMC HQ Tower 1, Jalan Impact, Cyber 6, 63000, Cyberjaya, Selangor.
- Minister responsible: Fahmi Fadzil, Minister of Communications
- Deputy Minister responsible: Teo Nie Ching, Deputy Minister of Communications
- Agency executive: Tan Sri Mohamad Salim bin Fateh Din, Chairman
- Parent department: Ministry of Communications
- Key documents: Malaysian Communications and Multimedia Commission Act 1998; Communications and Multimedia Act 1998
- Website: www.mcmc.gov.my

The Malaysian Communications and Multimedia Commission (Abbreviation: MCMC (Note: The Malay abbreviation, 'SKMM' was removed from the commission's corporate logo in June 2014 to avoid confusion with 'KKMM', an acronym for 'Kementerian Komunikasi dan Multimedia Malaysia' or Ministry of Communications and Multimedia Malaysia. Since then all media outlets in Malaysia (including TV3, Astro Awani and Malaysiakini) began to use the English acronym instead of Malay acronym. Despite the removal, the 'SKMM' acronym is still used interchangeably and secondarily in certain contexts with exception of its official website.); Malay: Suruhanjaya Komunikasi dan Multimedia Malaysia or SKMM) is a regulatory body whose key role is the regulation of the communications and multimedia industry based on the Malaysian Communications and Multimedia Commission Act 1998, the Communications and Multimedia Act 1998, and the Strategic Trade Act 2010. MCMC is similar to the National Telecommunications Commission (NTC) in the Philippines. Its role to implement and promote the Government's national policy objectives for the communications and multimedia sector.

MCMC is also charged with overseeing the new regulatory framework for the converging telecommunications and broadcasting industries and online activities. In 2001, the commission's role was expanded to include overseeing the postal service sector pursuant to the Postal Services Act 1991 and licensing of the Certification Authorities under the Digital Signature Act 1997.

The current chairman Tan Sri Mohamad Salim bin Fateh Din was appointed to the post on 1 March 2023 and ended his first two-year tenure contract on 28 February 2025. With effect from 1 March 2025, Salim was once again reappointed to a second two-year tenure contract until 28 February 2027.

== Commission Members ==
Chairman

Tan Sri Mohamad Salim bin Fateh Din

Commission Members

General Tan Sri Dato' Sri Zulkifeli bin Mohd Zin

Tan Sri Razarudin Husain

Datuk Abdul Halim Hamzah

Datuk Muhammad Azmi bin Mohd Zain

Prof Dr Mohamad Salmi bin Mohd Sohod

Dato' Sri Dr. Chee Hong Leong

Derek John Fernandez

Razali Othman

== Programmes & Initiatives ==
- Moratorium on New Licensing of Courier Services: A two-year moratorium on the issuance of courier service licences will help ease industry-overcrowding until September 2022. MCMC’s moratorium takes effect from 14 September 2020 until 15 September 2022. A new action plan via the National Postal and Courier Industry Laboratory (NPCIL) is in the works to support strategic development aspirations of the new postal and courier industry, and will be reported on and published at the end of November.
- PIK Transformation: MCMC empowers 1,064 community Internet centres nationwide to become digital transformation centres for local communities, especially for the younger demographic. Basic, as well as advanced, training sessions on information technology and communications (ICT), were provided. Amongst covered areas are programming, robotic applications, mobile application innovation, e-commerce entrepreneurship, animation, video production, 3D printing and other forms of training which could benefit the youngsters to learn, innovate and improve.
- WSIS Prizes 2020 for ‘Klik Dengan Bijak’: MCMC was announced as the Project Champion through the "Klik Dengan Bijak" project for the 'Ethical Dimensions of the Information Society’ category. The winning category was among 17 others that were competed in the Forum World Summit on the Information Society Prizes (WSIS) 2020 which took place in Geneva, Switzerland.
- Jalinan Digital Negara (JENDELA): Jalinan Digital Negara (JENDELA) is a digital infrastructure plan to meet the needs of digital connectivity and to help prepare the nation for a gradual transition to 5G technology and will also lay the foundation for comprehensive and high-quality broadband coverage facilities. Sabahans would benefit from the implementation of JENDELA from 2020 to 2022, through a planned addition of 382 new communication towers and the upgrading of 924 existing communication transmitters under the Universal Service Provision (USP) programme.
- MCMC and MyCC Jointly Address Exclusivity Arrangements In High-Rise Buildings: MCMC and the Malaysia Competition Commission (MyCC) collaborated in addressing exclusivity arrangements between telecommunications service providers and property developers or building management companies in high-rise buildings and residential complexes, following several complaints by the public. "Garis Panduan Perancangan Infrastruktur Komunikasi, (GPP-I)" was published to facilitate the planning and development of communications infrastructure in new property developments which resulted in long-term benefits for end users, who can choose service providers based on prices or quality of service.
- MCMC Handles 99.83% First Half of the Year Complaints: 99.83% of the 11,235 complaints related to cybercrimes were resolved in the first half of 2020. 18% of complaints were referred to social media platform providers for further action to be taken, while the remaining 1.27% or 143 complaints, were found to have violated provisions under Section 233 of the Communications and Multimedia Act 1998.
- The People-Centric Economic Stimulus Package (PRIHATIN): Announced by Prime Minister of Malaysia, Tan Sri Muhyiddin Yassin on 27 March 2020, the PRIHATIN package is the biggest economic stimulus package in the history of the nation. Several packages in collaboration with various telecommunications companies (telcos), estimated at RM 1 billion, and include efforts to improve telecommunications network and free Internet subscriptions, were offered.
- Sebenarnya.my Official Telegram Account: An official Telegram channel for the Sebenarnya.my portal was created to enhance the efforts to tackle the spread of fake news on social media including the COVID-19 pandemic.
- Distribution of myFreeview Decoders for Eligible B40 and PWDs: MCMC announced that registered B40 households and people with disabilities (PWD) nationwide are eligible to myFreeview decoders. A total of 3,000 myFreeview decoders were distributed in Sabah from 20-22 February 2020. The additional allocation of free decoders was an effort by the government to bridge the digital divide and to uplift the underprivileged groups across the country.
- 5GDP Malaysia Launch in Langkawi: A collaboration with Telekom Malaysia Bhd (TM) and Digi Telecommunications Sdn Bhd (Digi) in testing the capabilities, possibilities and limitations of 5G network sharing between multiple network-service operators during the 5GDP period and has portrayed synergy between fixed and mobile network operators in delivering 5G connectivity solutions.
- National Digital ID Framework: The National Digital ID initiative is aimed at advancing Malaysia into the cyber age. It is an advanced method of authenticating a user’s identity online, where it is safe, secure and protected. It will not be replacing MyKad as proof of citizenship but rather complement it as a form of identification when transacting digitally and is also a critical step in society’s migration to the digital realm and must be implemented through a Rakyat-centric framework.

== See also ==
- Digital Nasional Berhad (DNB)
