= Telekom Malaysia =

Malaysian telecommunications company

Telekom Malaysia Berhad
- Logo used since 2023

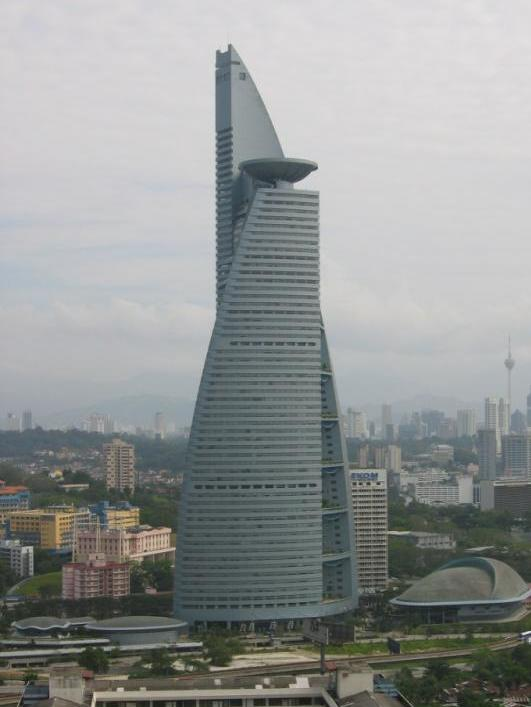
- Telekom Tower, former TM headquarters in Kuala Lumpur, Malaysia.
- Type: Publicly-traded, majority-State-owned company regulated by public law
- Traded as: MYX: 4863
- ISIN: MYL4863OO006
- Industry: Telecommunications
- Founded: 1 April 1946 (as Malaysian Telecommunications Department); 12 October 1984 (as Telekom Malaysia)
- Headquarters: Cyberjaya, Selangor, Malaysia
- Key people: Dato' Zainal Abidin Putih (Chairman) Amar Huzaimi Md Deris (Group Chief Executive Officer)
- Brands: TM Global; TM One; Unifi
- Revenue: ▼RM 11.82 billion (2018)
- Operating income: ▼RM 375.5 million (2018)
- Number of employees: ▼ > 24,000 (2018)
- Website: www.tm.com.my

Telekom Malaysia Berhad (TM) is a Malaysian telecommunications company that was founded in 1984. Beginning as the national telecommunications company for fixed line, radio, and television broadcasting services, it has evolved to become the country's largest provider of broadband services, data, fixed line, pay television, and network services. TM ventured into the LTE space with the launch of TMgo, its 4G offering. TM's 850 MHz service was rebranded as unifi Mobile in January 2018.

TM represents one of the largest government-linked companies in the country, with more than 28,000 employees and a market capitalisation of more than RM25 billion.

== History ==
=== Foundation and early years ===
Much of the telecommunications infrastructure in Malaysia was damaged during the Second World War and the Japanese occupation. In 1946, when the British re-established their position in Malaya, they repaired the trunk routes, restored fallen telephone poles and installed the copper wires that had either been damaged or stolen. During the Japanese occupation, the Posts & Telegraphs Department was split into two separate units. When the British returned, they initially re-united the two entities, but this effort was short-lived. Along with the formation of the Malayan Union on 1 April 1946, the Malaysian Telecommunications Department and the Postal Services Department were born, with the former controlling telegraph, telephone and wireless services and the latter overlooking mail, money orders and savings accounts.

During the emergency (1948-1960), there was a strong focus on providing communications links for the police and armed forces. This included the installation of radio stations in the jungle as well as very high frequency (VHF) radiotelephony over the normal state network. By 1953, all hill stop stations required for the police VHF network were completed, enabling every police station and police vehicle to communicate with headquarters and with each other. The police radio services were thought to be the largest scheme of its kind in the world.

At the same time, despite the Occupation, commercial activities began to flourish and demand for telecommunications services increased greatly. This necessitated a third floor to be built at the telephone exchange building in Kuala Lumpur. Along with the issue of 10 cent coins, phone booths began to spring up in Kuala Lumpur and Penang. From 1950 to 1953, the department's revenue more than doubled from $8 million to $17 million as the number of telephones installed rose from 20,000 to 39,000. Accordingly, the trunk and junction networks expanded, and the number of radio stations grew by 10 times to more than 1,000. In 1953, too, the Penang Auto Exchange was opened catering for 5,000 lines. In 1954, the Main Trunk Route linking Singapore to Malacca, Kuala Lumpur and Penang was completed. Satellite exchanges began to emerge. During this period, international connections have also increased, linking Malaysia with the rest of the world.

As independence became imminent, a comprehensive Malayanisation programme was embarked on to ensure the department would continue to be run by capable local personnel. From as early as 1954, no less than 21 Malaysians were pursuing studies in telecommunications related areas in Britain and Australia. Their numbers were boosted by youth enrolling at the Department's Gracelyn Training School.

=== Growth ===
Landline telephone number prefixes in Peninsular Malaysia

Following the country's Independence in 1957, the Malayan Telecommunications Department was renamed Jabatan Telekom. One of its first tasks was to provide telecommunications facilities throughout the nation, as part of the Rural Development Plan. Microwave radio links were established which, by 1962, covered most urban centres in Peninsular Malaysia. In 1962, too, the Government took control of international calls from Cable & Wireless, which had been operating Malaysia's overseas telecommunications services for almost 10 years. Subscriber trunk dialling (STD) was introduced, enabling telephone owners in Kuala Lumpur to call Singapore directly, without having to go through an operator, using the first long-distance microwave link. Overseas calls were further enhanced with the roll-out of SEACOM, which formed part of the Commonwealth Cable Scheme. In 1961, the Federation of Malaya and Singapore became partners in this initiative, with Malaya investing about $12 million in it. The first phase of SEACOM between Singapore and Jesselton (Kota Kinabalu), in Sabah, was opened on 15 January 1964. On 30 March 1967, the entire system was commissioned.

The expanding microwave network enabled Jabatan Telekom to launch television services in Peninsular Malaysia in 1963, using the same system. While Radio Televisyen Malaysia (RTM) controlled the content of local TV, Jabatan Telekom managed the transmission of microwaves from the studio to homes.

As prior to 1963, Sabah and Sarawak were not part of the Federation of Malaya, telecommunications services in these East Malaysia states were managed independently, by the Telecommunications Department of Sabah and Sarawak. In 1968, this department merged with that of Peninsular Malaysia to form the Telecommunications Department of Malaysia.

In 1970, further expanding Malaysia's international connectivity, an earth satellite station was built near Kuantan for communications via the Indian Ocean Intelsat III satellite. The station, costing $9 million, was completed in a record 12 months by a fully local team. The station was to serve primarily external telephone, telegraph and telex communications, however it also enhanced the reception of international television programmes.

In 1975, the International Telex Exchange was opened, allowing businesses to send telexes. Four years later, International Direct Dialling (IDD) services were introduced and the first electronic exchange was commissioned in Johor Bahru. The volume of new development was such that, in the early 1980s, the department was compelled to appoint contractors to help build new lines and extend the cable network.

Telekom Malaysia's logo from 1990 until 2006

In terms of systems, the year 1985 was a watershed. This was when Automatic Telephone Using Radio (ATUR) 450 – the earliest precursor in Malaysia to today's mobile service – was introduced. The service provided almost universal coverage with the installation of five mobile telephone exchanges and many radio base stations.

In line with the Government's privatisation agenda, and in recognition of the benefits Jabatan Telekom would enjoy unencumbered by policies and budgets, steps towards this end were embarked on beginning in 1985. On 1 January 1987, a corporatised Syarikat Telekom Malaysia (STM) was born, under the Telecommunications Service (Successor Company) Act 1985. The company was immediately faced with various challenges including a huge debt, inventories that had been unused for years and a workforce that still operated on a civil servant mentality. Although the company embarked on a comprehensive programme to transform the organisation, with a strong focus on customer service, the results took time. Some disgruntled customers even suggested that competition be allowed in the industry to improve standards.

Challenges aside, STM continued to adopt new technologies as they emerged and to offer these to its customer base. Corporate Information Superhighway (COINS) was launched, a globally linked fibre optic backbone capable of transmitting digital signals at 10 Mbit/s, which was among the fastest of such service in the world. At the same time, the process of transforming the Main Trunk Route network from analogue to digital began, and was completed by 2000. This transformation received a boost once the RM150 million Kuantan-Kota Kinabalu submarine fibre optic cable became operational. For the first time, too, STM invested in a new optical fibre submarine cable system linking Malaysia, Singapore, Hong Kong, Taiwan and Japan. Each optic fibre in the cable system could carry traffic at 560 Mbit/s, equivalent to 30,000 simultaneous phone calls.

The next logical step to buffer its finances was to undergo a listing. STM was listed on 7 November 1990, achieving a market value of RM27 billion or 10% of the total market capitalisation of the Kuala Lumpur Stock Exchange (now Bursa Malaysia). The volume of trading was such that KLSE had to suspend activity on the stock for 10 minutes to prevent its system from jamming, as it was unable to handle the sheer number of incoming orders.

Following its listing, STM has evolved to be known as Telekom Malaysia Berhad (TMB), and the Company pushed ahead with new products to increase its subscriber base, launching services such as TELECAJ, a billing option for those who travelled a great deal; Malaysia Direct for those travelling overseas; and Telestock, a dial-up facility to retrieve up-to-date share prices. In 1992, it introduced video conferencing facilities nationwide as well as Centrex, a virtual PABX system that allows larger organisations the option of functioning without operators, enabling customers to reach staff directly. In 1993, the nationwide digital transmission network and the Integrated Services Digital Network (ISDN) pilot projects were completed.

=== Cellular Mobile Services ===
Telekom Malaysia's logo from 2006 until 2022

Even before listing, STM had entered into a partnership with the Fleet Holdings to launch Celcom, the country's first private mobile system (ART 900) using Ericsson's Total Access Communication System (TACS). Private mobile systems were needed to supplement ATUR, which could no longer handle the volume of traffic it was receiving. Not long after, STM divested its 51% stake in Celcom to Alpine Resources, to start its own mobile enterprise based on the US-based Advanced Mobile Phone System (AMPS). Subsequently, the Government handed out six Global System for Mobile Communications (GSM) licences, but none of these were to STM. It was only in 1996 that STM was able to introduce its 1800 MHz digital TMTOUCH cellular service. In 2003, TMTOUCH merged with Celcom to form the country's largest cellular operator. Two years later, this cellular operator launched the country's first 3G service.

Meanwhile, TMB also ventured into the mobile business overseas and it obtained its first GSM licence in Sri Lanka in 1994. This was followed by licences in India and Ghana, although it relinquished its businesses in these countries within a couple of years due to political circumstances. Undeterred, TMB continued to make forays abroad and, by 2000, had a presence in South Africa, Guinea, Malawi, Cambodia, Thailand and Bangladesh. Eventually the company decided to consolidate its investments overseas and concentrate on markets closer to home. Thus by 2004, its mobile international presence was concentrated in Malaysia, Singapore, Sri Lanka, Bangladesh, Cambodia, India, Iran and Pakistan. In 2005, TMB underwent a major rebranding as TM. At the end of 2007, TM's total international cellular subscriber base stood at 30.3 million.

=== Demerger ===
In 2007, TM began the process of demerger to separate its mobile and fixed line services into two distinct entities. The exercise, one of the major influxes in the company's history, was completed in April 2008, resulting in TM continuing to manage its domestic fixed line and broadband services; and TM International Berhad (TMI), a newly formed company, assuming control of TM's regional mobile services. TMI subsequently underwent a rebranding and on 2 April 2009 was renamed Axiata.

However, TM will return to mobile business via its subsidiary P1 on Q2 2016, after signing a 5-year domestic roaming agreement with Celcom on 28 January 2016. TM had already operating 4G FDD LTE on 850 MHz band and planned to do so by using 2600 MHz TDD LTE band which is owned by its subsidiary P1.

=== Return to wireless ===
==== TM Net ====
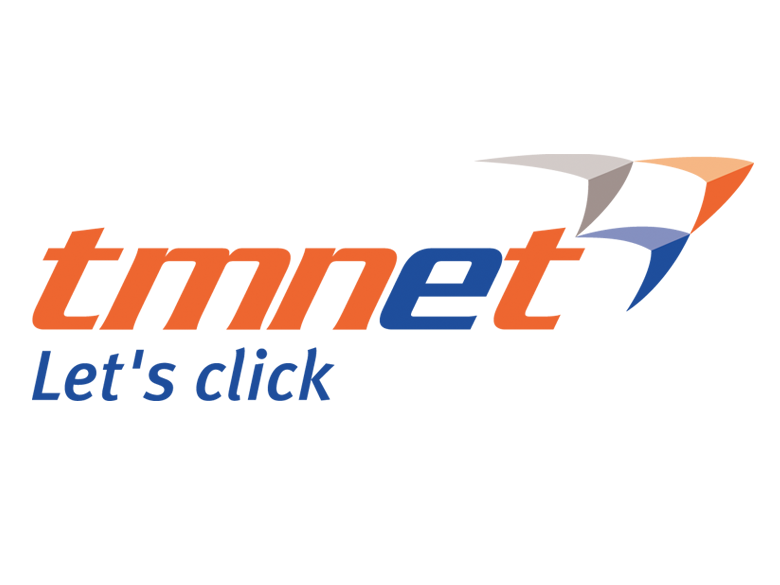
The TM Net logo

In 1995, TMB was awarded a licence to become the second Internet Service Provider (ISP) in the country, the first being MIMOS with its service, Jaring. TM Net, as TMB's service was called, marked the beginning of TMB's transformation into an integrated telecommunications service provider. One of its first developments towards this end was the introduction of COINS, a multimedia networking solution based on Asynchronous Transfer Mode (ATM) technology. This was seen as one of several prerequisites for the successful implementation of the Multimedia Super Corridor (MSC).

==== Streamyx ====
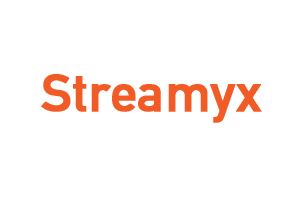
The Streamyx logo

Building up its data offerings, in 2001 TMB launched Streamyx, its first broadband service for the general population and BlueHyppo.com, a lifestyle internet portal. In the same year, TM Net was acknowledged as the largest ISP in Southeast Asia; and the company also launched CDMA fixed wireless telephony.

==== UNIFI ====
The unifi logo

On 24 March 2010, unifi, the nation's first HSBB service, was launched. unifi is a combination of internet, voice and IPTV service (known as HyppTV). By the end of 2012, TM had deployed the HSBB network to 1.377 million premises, on schedule and below budget. Last mile access to homes and businesses is being achieved by fibre-to-the home (FTTH), ethernet-to-the-home (ETTH), and very high-speed digital subscriber line 2 (VDSL2). BT Teleconsult, a UK-based telco consulting firm, has credited the HSBB network roll-out as one of the fastest and lowest cost in the world.

As of June 2015, TM had 2.9 million broadband customers, of whom 51% are on high speed broadband. The number of unifi subscribers as of June 2015 was close to 782,000, representing a take-up rate of approximately 46%. As at November 2015, HyppTV offered a total of 124 channels with 49 channels in high definition (HD) – consisting of 57 premium channels, 22 free channels, five Radio channels, 15 video on demand (VOD) channels and 25 interactive channels in a variety of packages or via à la carte options.

In 2015, TM had been awarded with phase 2 of the High Speed Broadband (HSBB2) project as well as the Sub Urban Broadband (SUBB) Project by the Government, to deploy domestic core networks to deliver end-to-end broadband network infrastructure and services.

Unifi are one of the most slowest ISP in Malaysia, TM misrepresented broadband speeds for its home internet plans. It stated that there are 200 MBPS of upload speed available to customer but in fact there are only 100 MBPS to customer. This is counted as an illegal action by the ISP in Malaysia. Unifi still claim that there are some typo on the promotional banner, but this is not acceptable for the largest ISP in Malaysia.

Available unifi internet plans:

Name	Download Speed	Upload Speed
Lite Plan	10 Mbit/s	5 Mbit/s
Advance Plan	30 Mbit/s	10 Mbit/s
Pro Plan	100 Mbit/s	50 Mbit/s

=== UNIFI Mobile ===
In January 2018, TM relaunched it mobile service as one unifi Mobile brand. unifi Mobile basically is a prepaid plan featured with no expiry as long the user stayed active. unifi mobile LTE network consists of 850 MHz FDD-LTE (Band 5), 2300 MHz TD-LTE (Band40) and TD-LTE 2600 MHz (Band 38). unifi mobile utilizes its TMgo 850 MHz LTE band 5 spectrum (refarmed from CDMA 850 MHz), and Celcom provides domestic roaming on 3G and 2G. On the 2.3 GHz WiMAX and 2.6 GHz LTE bands, TM rebranded P1 to webe in 2014 after the acquisition.

=== TM One ===
The TM ONE logo

In August 2017, as part of its new execution approach, TM consolidated its enterprise and public sector operations, which includes its ICT and data services unit and rebranded them into a new brand “TM One”.

== Operations ==
With the reconsolidation of TM's businesses in August 2017, TM's three customer-focused clusters are unifi, TM ONE and TM GLOBAL.

=== TM GLOBAL ===
TM GLOBAL focuses on the domestic and international wholesale business, in connectivity, data, infrastructure, voice and multimedia services. Based in Kuala Lumpur, TM GLOBAL oversees regional offices in Singapore, Hong Kong, the United Kingdom, United States, Dubai and Australia. With a presence in more than 50 countries, TM GLOBAL develops TM's terrestrial network, submarine cable system and satellite connectivity.

In 2024, TM Global announced plans to expand its Klang Valley Data Centre (KVDC) in Cyberjaya and the Iskandar Puteri Data Centre (IPDC) in Johor to address increasing demand for both domestic and international data hosting services. This expansion is a part of Telekom Malaysia's roadmap to establish Malaysia as a preferred digital hub in Southeast Asia and aligns with its vision of becoming a digital powerhouse by 2030.

The second phase of these expansions, set for commercial operations in 2025, will provide a combined IT load of approximately 20 MW and meet the Uptime Institute’s Tier-III standards along with the Leadership in Energy and Environmental Design (LEED) Silver Rating for sustainability. TM Global’s partnership with Nxera will further support the development of a hyperconnected, AI-ready data centre, enhancing Malaysia's infrastructure for cloud, advanced analytics, artificial intelligence, and the Internet of Things (IoT) applications.

=== TM One ===
TM One focuses on the enterprise and public sector customers, organising itself around seven main clusters, or vertical industries – Banking and Finance, Oil and Gas, Real Estate, Health, Education, Defence and Security and Public Shared Services. TM One caters to the connectivity and digital needs of corporations and the government sector by providing services such as Connectivity, Collaboration, Cloud, Security, Data Centre, Business Process Outsourcing (BPO) and Smart Services.

TM One's corporate office is located in Menara TM One in Damansara.

=== unifi ===
unifi offers broadband and WiFi services such as unifi TV. In August 2014, TM Consumer launched a broadband-to-go service, TMgo, and the service is now available in underserved areas in several states, namely Kedah, Melaka, Perak, Selangor, Pahang, Terengganu, Kelantan, Sabah and Sarawak. It has also entered a collaboration with the Government to provide devices and broadband services to low-income households nationwide. TMgo has been rebranded as unifi mobile in January 2018.

== Subsidiaries and holding companies ==
=== Unifi ===
In late January 2018, TM consolidated its brands into unifi. Its TV business, HyppTV, was rebranded as unifi TV. Meanwhile, HyppTV Everywhere was rebranded as unifi Play TV. Its mobile brand, Webe, was renamed to unifi Mobile. It also has broadband and WiFi services.

=== Multimedia University (MMU) ===
Multimedia University was set up through TM's wholly owned subsidiary Universiti Telekom Sdn Bhd (UTSB) in 1996, and is Malaysia's first private university. Its two campuses – in Melaka and Cyberjaya – host a total of approximately 15,000 students in pre-university, foundation, diploma, bachelor’s, master’s and doctoral level - attracting international students from over 76 countries that make up over 16% of its population.

=== Telekom Malaysia Research & Development (TM R&D) ===
Based in Cyberjaya, Telekom Research & Development Sdn Bhd (or TM R&D) is a wholly owned subsidiary of Universiti Telekom Sdn Bhd which is 100% owned by Telekom Malaysia Berhad (TM). It was incorporated in 2000 and commenced operations in 2001. TM R&D is the innovation centre for the TM Group and leads the entire R&D functions of Multimedia University.

=== Multimedia College (MMC) ===
Multimedia College offers vocational programmes in the fields of Multimedia and IT. These include eight diploma programmes accredited by MQA in Technology (Telecommunications Engineering), Electronic Engineering, Software Engineering, Business Information Systems, Information Technology, Creative New Media, and Management and Accounting. In addition, the campus in Terengganu has become the only private college in the East Coast to offer a Malaysian Skills Certificate Programme or Program Sijil Kemahiran Malaysia (SKM) on multimedia content development. As of March 2015, SKM graduates will be able to pursue their studies at the diploma level (Level 4).

MMC has branches in Kuala Lumpur, Perak, Terengganu, Sabah and Sarawak. Together, all five campuses boast a 1,768-strong student population. Since its establishment in 1997, MMC has produced a total of 7,067 graduates. The operations of MMC had been amalgamated into Multimedia University since 2017.

=== Kuala Lumpur Tower ===
The 421-metre Kuala Lumpur Tower (Malay: Menara Kuala Lumpur, MKL) is the seventh tallest telecommunications tower in the world and the tallest in Southeast Asia. A member of the World Federation of Great Towers (WFGT), it is the only tower in the world to be built within a forest reserve. The tower was officially opened in 1996.

=== Alor Setar Tower ===
At 165.5m, the Alor Setar Tower (Malay: Menara Alor Setar, MAS) is the world's 22nd tallest telecommunications tower.

=== Telekom Museum ===
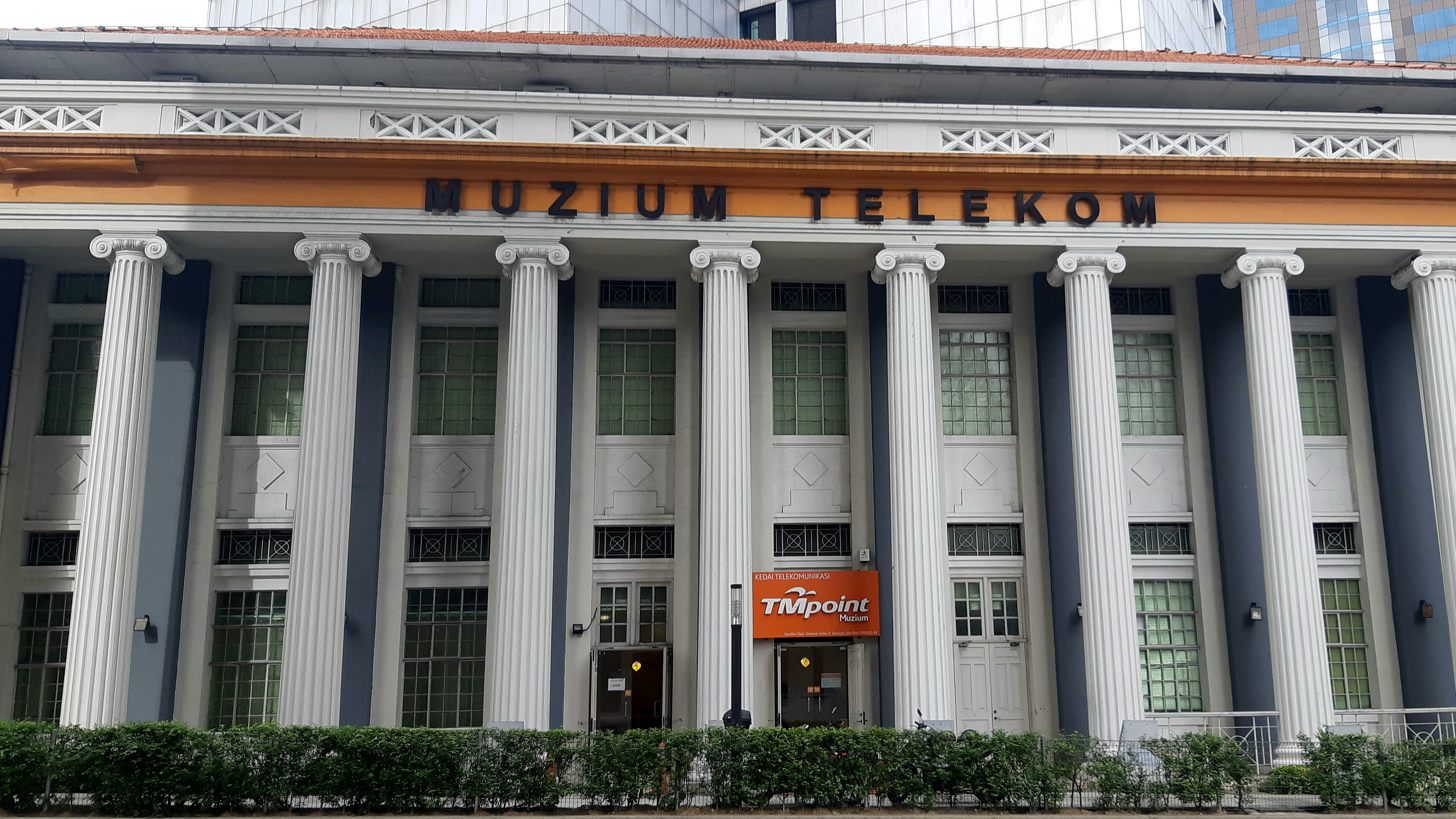
Telekom Museum

This museum is housed in a neo-classical building, constructed in 1928 to serve as a telephone exchange. Today, it has a collection of telecommunications devices depicting the evolution of Malaysia's telecommunications industry.

=== TM One ===
TM One is a consolidated brand following the reorganisation of TM business clusters in 2017, along with the consolidated brand of unifi and TM Global. With the consolidation, TM One consists of its previous business cluster Managed Accounts (TM Enterprise and TM Government) and several of TM Group's subsidiaries servicing the same cluster of customers, namely VADS, VADS Lyfe and GITN.

=== Fibrecomm Network (M) Sdn Bhd ===
This company has existed since 1995. It was established under Celcom, which was previously under TM at that period. TM owns 51 percent shares while Tenaga Nasional Berhad owns the rest of the shares. The company's main products are bandwidth, wavelength and internet access.

=== Fiberail (M) Sdn Bhd ===
This company was incorporated in 1992. It is jointly owned by TM and KTM Berhad, Malaysia's state-owned railway operator. The company provides fiberoptic cable networks along the railway and gas pipeline corridors in Malaysia.

== See also ==
- History of Communications in Malaysia
- National Broadband Initiative (Malaysia)
- Telecommunications in Malaysia
- TM F.C.
