= Ninetology Pearl Mini =

Entry-level smartphone

- Manufacturer: Ninetology
- Series: Touch
- Availability by region: Malaysia
- Compatible networks: GSM 900 / 1800; GPRS/EDGE class B, multislot class 33; UMTS 2011; HSDPA Cat9, 10.2 Mbps
- Form factor: Touchscreen
- Dimensions: Width: 62.0 mm; Height: 115.3 mm; Thickness: 11.8 mm
- Weight: 108 g (4 oz)
- Operating system: Android Gingerbread 2.3
- CPU: Qualcomm Snapdragon Single Core 1.0 GHz
- Memory: 256 MB RAM; 512 MB ROM
- Storage: -
- Removable storage: up to 32 GB microSDHC
- Battery: 1300 mAh Li-Ion battery (removable); micro USB and 2 mm DC plug charging
- Rear camera: 2.0 MP
- Front camera: -
- Display: Capacitive Display, 321x 480px HVGA, 3.5", 262K Colors
- Connectivity: WLAN IEEE 802.11 b/g/n (2.4 GHz); bluetooth 3.0; micro USB 2.0; 3.5 mm AV connector (audio in/out); Dual SIM card Capability; FM receiver
- Data inputs: Capacitive Multi-touch display; External functional hardware keys
- Development status: Released 2012

The Ninetology Pearl Mini (I5350) is an entry-level smartphone powered by a Qualcomm Snapdragon (1.0 GHz) processor and runs on the Android Ginger Bread 2.3 Operating System, with dual SIM capabilities. The device is manufactured by Ninetology in collaboration with Qualcomm and Tune Talk.

The phone is offered sealed with a default SIM card from a Malaysian mobile virtual network operator(Tune Talk).

== History ==
=== Release ===
The Ninetology Pearl Mini (I5350) was announced at a launch event themed 'Experiencing Differences with The Youth's Spirit,' during the month of April, 2013.

== Feature ==
=== Hardware ===
The Ninetology Pearl Mini I5350 runs on a Qualcomm Snapdragon 1.0 GHz single core processor. It has a 3.5" inch HVGA capacitive display screen(196ppi pixel density) with a resolution of 320 X 480, capable of displaying up to 262K colors. Its dimensions are: 115.3 mm (H) X 62.0 mm (W) X 11.8 mm (T) and weighs 108 grams.

It possesses a 2.0 megapixel rear camera with a 4x zoom feature and a scene mode function.

The battery has a capacity of Li-Ion 1300mAh.

Additional storage is available via a MicroSD card socket, which is certified to support up to 32 GB of additional storage.

=== Software ===
The Ninetology Pearl Mini I5350 is running on the Android Gingerbread Operating System and is preloaded with a variety of applications:

- Web: Native Android Browser
- Social: Facebook, YouTube
- Media: Camera, Gallery, FM Radio, Music Player, Video Player,
- Personal Information Management: Calendar, Detail Contact Information
- Utilities: Calculator, Alarm Clock, Google Maps, AirAsia, Voice Recorder, Tune Talk

== Reception ==
According to Business Times Malaysia, Ninetology had secured 25,000 units from dealers in less than 45 days since the launch date of the Pearl Mini.
