= Ninetology Stealth II =

- Manufacturer: Ninetology
- Series: Touch
- Availability by region: Malaysia
- Compatible networks: GSM 900 / 1800; GPRS/EDGE class B, multislot class 33; UMTS 900 / 2100; HSDPA Cat9, 10.2 Mb/s
- Form factor: Touchscreen
- Dimensions: Width: 76.5 mm; Height: 147.0 mm; Thickness: 9.7 mm
- Weight: 164 g (6 oz)
- Operating system: Android Ice Cream Sandwich 4.0
- CPU: Dual core 1.0 GHz
- Memory: 512 MB RAM; 4 GB ROM
- Storage: 4 GB internal memory (1 GB available to end user)
- Removable storage: up to 32 GB microSDHC
- Battery: 2000 mAh Li-Ion battery (removable); micro USB and 2 mm DC plug charging
- Rear camera: 8.0 MP
- Front camera: 0.3 MP
- Display: Capacitive, IPS LCD 854 × 480px FWVGA, 5.0", 16M colors
- Connectivity: WLAN IEEE 802.11 b/g/n (2.4 GHz); bluetooth 3.0; micro USB 2.0; USB On-the-Go 1.3; 3.5 mm AV connector (audio in/out); Dual SIM card capability; FM receiver
- Data inputs: Capacitive multi-touch display; External functional touch pad keys
- Development status: Released 2012

The Ninetology Stealth II (I9500) is a smart mobile phone manufactured by Ninetology with dual SIM capabilities. It is a high-end smartphone, using a dual core (1.0 GHz) processor, and runs the Android Ice Cream Sandwich 4.0 Operating System.

The phone is offered sealed with a default SIM card from a Malaysian telecommunications provider (Digi).

== History ==
Ninetology is a Malaysian Based Smartphone Manufacturer. In 2013 their revenues were about MYR 180 million. For the year 2014, the company set revenue target of MYR 380 million. Also Ninetology will invest up to MYR 5 million, to increase its experiential centres to 9 other locations across Malaysia by 2015 as part of their expansion plan in the country

=== Release ===
The Ninetology Stealth II I9500 was announced on March 6, 2013.

== Feature ==
=== Hardware ===
The Ninetology Stealth II I9500 has a dimension of 147.0 mm (H) X 76.5 mm (W) X 9.7 mm (T) and weighs 164 grams. A dual core 1.0 GHz processor is used to power the device. It has a 5.0 inch capacitive IPS LCD screen display with a FWVGA (196 ppi pixel density) resolution of 854 X 480, displaying up to 16M colors.

It possesses an 8.0 megapixel rear camera with a LED flash feature and an auto focus function, as well as a VGA front-facing camera.

The main SIM card slot is visible once the back cover is removed and can be accessed by removing the battery pack. The second SIM Card slot is located right below the main SIM card slot. The battery possesses a capacity of Li-Ion 2000mAh.

Additional storage is available via a MicroSD card socket, which is certified to support up to 32 GB of additional storage.

=== Software ===
The Ninetology Stealth II I9500 is running on the Android Ice Cream Sandwich Operating System and is preloaded with a variety of applications:

- Web: Native Android Browser
- Social: Facebook, YouTube
- Media: Camera, Gallery, FM Radio, Music Player, Video Player,
- Personal Information Management: Calendar, Detail Contact Information
- Utilities: Calculator, Alarm Clock, Google Maps, News and Weather Application, Voice Recorder
