= Ninetology Outlook Pure =

Android tablet

- Manufacturer: Ninetology
- Series: Touch
- Availability by region: Malaysia
- Compatible networks: GSM 900/1800/1900; GPRS/EDGE class B, multislot class 33; UMTS 900/2011; HSDPA Cat9, 10.2 Mbps
- Form factor: Touchscreen
- Dimensions: Width: 122.5 mm; Height: 192.4 mm; Thickness: 10.5 mm
- Weight: 330 g (12 oz)
- Operating system: Android Ice Cream Sandwich 4.0
- System-on-chip: MediaTek
- CPU: Cortex A9 Dual Core 1.0 GHz
- Memory: 1 GB RAM; 8 GB ROM
- Storage: -
- Removable storage: up to 32 GB microSDHC
- Battery: 3000 mAh Li-Ion battery; micro USB and 2 mm DC plug charging
- Rear camera: 2.0 MP
- Front camera: 0.3 MP
- Display: Capacitive HD LCD, 1024x 600, 196 PPI pixel density, 7.0"
- Connectivity: WLAN IEEE 802.11 b/g/n (2.4 GHz); bluetooth 4.0; micro USB 2.0; 3.5 mm AV connector (audio in/out); FM receiver
- Data inputs: Capacitive Multi-touch display; External functional hardware keys
- Development status: Released 2013

The Ninetology Outlook Pure (T8700) tablet is powered by a Cortex A9 dual core (1.0 GHz) processor and is running on the Android Ice Cream Sandwich 4.0 Operating System, with 3G capabilities. The device is a result of collaboration between Clixster, Angkatan Koperasi Kebangsaan Malaysia Bhd (ANGKASA) and Ninetology.

== History ==
=== Release ===
The Ninetology Outlook Pure (T8700) was announced on at a launch event organized by Clixster on 16 May 2013 and was released to the public for purchase in June.

== Feature ==
=== Hardware ===
The Ninetology Outlook Pure (T8700) has a Cortex-A9 dual core 1.0 GHz processor and a 7.0" inch HD LCD capacitive (196 ppi pixel density) display screen with a resolution of 1024 X 600. It possesses a dimension of 192.4 mm (H) X 122.5 mm (W) X 10.5 mm (T) and weighs 330 grams.

The Ninetology Outlook Pure (T8700) supports 3G and WiFi capabilities and has a rear camera with a 2.0 megapixel camera, followed by a 0.3 MP front-facing camera.

The battery has a capacity of Li-Ion 3000mAh.

Additional storage is available via a MicroSD card socket, which is certified to support up to 32 GB of additional storage.

=== Software ===
The Ninetology Outlook Pure is running on the Android Ice Cream Sandwich 4.0 Operating System and is preloaded with a variety of applications:

- Web: Native Android Browser
- Social: Facebook, YouTube
- Media: Camera, Gallery, FM Radio, Music Player, Video Player,
- Personal Information Management: Calendar, Detail Contact Information
- Utilities: Calculator, Alarm Clock, Google Maps, AirAsia, Voice Recorder, Tune Talk
- Gaming: Diamond Dash, Subway Surfer
