= Ninetology U9X1 =

Smartphone

- Manufacturer: Ninetology
- Availability by region: Indonesia and Malaysia
- Compatible networks: EDGE / GPRS (850 / 900 / 1,800 / 1,900 MHz) HSPA+ 21 / 42.2 Mbps
- Form factor: Touchscreen
- Weight: 160 g (6 oz)
- Operating system: Android Jelly Bean 4.2.2
- CPU: Quad core 1.2 GHz
- GPU: PowerVR SGX544
- Memory: 1 GB RAM
- Storage: 16 GB internal memory
- Removable storage: up to 32 GB microSDHC
- Battery: 2200 mAh Li-Ion battery (removable)
- Rear camera: 13.0 MP
- Front camera: 2.0 MP (720p HD)
- Display: Capacitive 5-Point, IPS Touch Screen, Super AMOLED HD 1280 X 720ppx, 4.8", 309ppi
- Connectivity: Bluetooth 3.0 micro-USB 2.0; Wi-Fi (802.11a/b/g/n); Wi-Fi Direct; FM radio with RDS; A-GPS and GLONASS
- Data inputs: Capacitive multi-touch display External functional touch pad keys

The Ninetology U9X1 (i9480) is a high-end smartphone developed by Malaysian-based smartphone manufacturer Ninetology. The phone has quad-core MediaTek 1.2 GHz processor, and a RAM of 1 GB, with an internal memory of 16 GB which can be extended to another 32 GB by use of microSD cards. The device also supports dual-sim, internet connectivity through 2G and 3G, apart from Wi-Fi. Navigation systems including A-GPS and GLONASS with Google Maps. It runs on the Android Jelly Bean 4.2 OS. The X1 is one of the three Ninetology U9 series models that was released in July 2013 and this phone is only available to Malaysia and Indonesia. The phone uses a 2200 mAh Li-ion battery that is capable of lasting up to 8 hours.

== Features ==
- 4.8″ Super AMOLED Plus HD display; 1280 x 720 px
- Dual SIM
- 1.2 GHz quad core MediaTek processor
- 1 GB RAM
- 16 GB internal memory
- 16-megapixels primary camera, 2-megapixels secondary camera
- 720p @ 30fps full HD recording with video effect, Aperture, 2nd Generation BSI, HDR, Zero Shutter Delay, Panorama shooting, Face Detection, Fast Burst Shot
- Android 4.2.2 (Jelly Bean)
- Bluetooth, Wi-Fi, 3G
- Stock theme, Play Store
- Accelerometer, gyro, proximity, compass, GPS and GLONASS support
- Messaging: SMS (threaded view), MMS, Email
- Stereo FM radio with RDS
- Google Play, Google Search, Maps, Gmail, YouTube, Calendar, Google Talk, Picasa
- Voice Memo/Dial/Commands

== Release ==
On July 30, 2013, Ninetology Malaysia announced the launch of the X1 smartphone and released in August. In October 2013, the smartphone became available in Indonesia.
