= Telephone numbers in Malaysia =

- Country: Malaysia
- Continent: Asia
- Regulator: MCMC
- Numbering plan type: Open
- NSN length: 8 to 10
- Format: With country code: +60 1x xxx xxxx; +60 11 xxxx xxxx; +60 3 xxxx xxxx; +60 8x xxx xxx; +60 x xxx xxxx; Without country code: 01x xxx xxxx; 011 xxxx xxxx; 03 xxxx xxxx; 08x xxx xxx; 0x xxx xxxx
- Country code: +60
- International access: 00
- Long-distance: 0

Telephone numbers in Malaysia are regulated by the Malaysian Communications and Multimedia Commission (MCMC). Landline telephone numbers consist of an area code of 1 to 2 digits (excluding the leading zero), followed by a 6 to 8-digit subscriber number. Mobile phone numbers consist of a mobile phone code of 2 digits followed by a 7- to 8-digit subscriber number. Mobile phone codes are originally assigned to specific mobile network operators; however, with mobile number portability, a mobile phone number might no longer be associated with its original assigned operator.

Until 2017, calls from within Malaysia to Singapore did not require international dialling; they were made using the 02 domestic access code. However, following a directive from MCMC, it was discontinued in stages in May and June 2017. It was discontinued early on 16 May 2017 by Telekom Malaysia, and discontinued entirely by other Malaysia telecommunications companies on 1 July 2017. The normal international prefix of +65 has been made mandatory after that date. Singapore had already discontinued its direct dialling system for calls to Malaysia in 1995 due to the divergence in both countries' numbering plans; previously, a caller from within Singapore wishing to reach a number in Malaysia (and vice versa) only had to dial the area prefix (e.g. 04 for Penang) followed by the number, much like a state-to-state domestic call within Malaysia.

Similarly, calls to Brunei from within East Malaysia can be made using the 080 domestic access code, but calls from within Peninsular Malaysia to Brunei require the international prefix 00673.

== Landline area codes ==
Landline area codes are, excluding the STD prefix 0, one digit in Peninsular Malaysia (area codes 3 to 7 and 9) and two digits in East Malaysia (area codes 8x). In Peninsular Malaysia, an area code is usually shared by multiple states and territories and roughly follows state borders. The two East Malaysian states, Sabah and Sarawak, are split into multiple area codes.

Landline subscriber numbers are seven digits in Peninsular Malaysia (except Selangor, Kuala Lumpur and Putrajaya, i.e. area code 3) and six digits in East Malaysia. Until 1995, subscriber numbers in Peninsular Malaysia were six digits in areas other than area code 3. Prior to 2001, subscriber numbers were seven digits in Selangor, Kuala Lumpur and Putrajaya. From 1999 to 2001, subscriber numbers in these areas were gradually expanded to eight digits in phases to meet new demands that resulted from the growing population in the Klang Valley.

Thus, a full national number is 10 digits in area code 3 and 9 digits elsewhere, including the STD prefix 0. Examples:

- A number 2xxx xxxx in Kuala Lumpur: 03 2xxx xxxx
- A number 2xx xxxx in George Town, Penang: 04 2xx xxxx
- A number 2xx xxxx in Johor Bahru, Johor: 07 2xx xxxx
- A number 2x xxxx in Kuching, Sarawak: 082 2x xxxx

When calling from a landline, calls to landlines within the same area code do not require the area code to be dialled. Calls to and from mobile phones require full national dialling codes. e.g. When calling a number 2xxx xxxx in Kuala Lumpur (03) from a landline:

- Within Selangor, Kuala Lumpur and Putrajaya: 2xxx xxxx
- Outside Selangor, Kuala Lumpur and Putrajaya, Within Malaysia: 03 2xxx xxxx
- Outside Malaysia: +60 3 2xxx xxxx (the initial 0 of the area code is omitted)

Telephone number prefixes in Peninsular Malaysia

Prefix	Area
02	None; formerly the domestic access code to Singapore (Discontinued on 15 May 2017 by Telekom Malaysia and by all other providers on 1 July 2017.)
03	Selangor (Federal Territories of Malaysia) Kuala Lumpur (Federal Territories of Malaysia) Putrajaya; Genting Highlands, Pahang
04	Perlis; Kedah; Penang; Pengkalan Hulu, Perak
05	Perak; Cameron Highlands, Pahang; Hulu Bernam, Selangor
06	Negeri Sembilan; Malacca; Muar, Johor; Tangkak, Johor Batu Anam, Segamat, Johor
07	Johor; Gemas, Negeri Sembilan
080	Domestic access code from East Malaysia to Brunei
081	Reserved number for future use
082	Sarawak – Kuching, Samarahan and Serian
083	Sarawak – Sri Aman and Betong
084	Sarawak – Sibu, Sarikei, Mukah and Kapit
085	Sarawak – Miri, Limbang and Lawas
086	Sarawak – Bintulu and Belaga
087	(Federal Territories of Malaysia) Labuan; Interior Division, Sabah
088	Sabah – Kota Kinabalu and Kudat
089	Sabah – Lahad Datu, Sandakan and Tawau
09	Pahang; Terengganu; Kelantan

== Mobile phone codes and IP telephony ==
Mobile phone codes and IP telephony codes are in the area code 1, ranging 2 digits excluding the leading zero.

Subscriber number length is seven- or eight-digit, depending on the mobile phone code. Numbers in the 011 and 015 codes are eight digits long, while all other numbers are seven digits long. Therefore, a full national number (including the leading zero) is 11 digits long for 011 and 015 numbers, and 10 digits long for all other numbers.

Calling to and from mobile phones always require full national dialling, even with mobile phones in the same mobile phone code. When calling from outside Malaysia, the leading zero is dropped. For example, a number 010 xxx xxxx is dialled as +60 10 xxx xxxx from outside Malaysia.

Originally, each mobile phone operator was issued one mobile phone prefix code. Through a series of mergers, there were three major mobile phone operators: Celcom, Maxis and Digi as of 2005. Then on 1 December 2022, Celcom and Digi merged as CelcomDigi. As existing numbers began to run out, the three mobile phone operators were assigned numbers in 014 prefix code distinguished by the first digit of the seven-digit subscriber number.

With the proliferation of new mobile virtual network operators and the exhaustion of existing codes, two new ranges 011 and 015 are made available for assignment. Subscriber numbers are eight digits long, resulting in an 11-digit mobile number including the leading zero. 011 1 was made available to mobile phone operators starting 15 December 2010. The two major ISPs in Malaysia, TMNet and Jaring are assigned numbers in the 015 4 prefix to provide VoIP (also known as Telephony Service over IP, TSoIP) service. New numbers are assigned in smaller blocks of 10,000, 100,000 or 1,000,000 numbers, as opposed to the previous practice of assigning a whole prefix to an operator, which is a block of nearly 8,000,000 numbers.

The advent of mobile number portability means the current operator of a particular mobile phone number is not necessarily the original assigned operator of the number.

Mobile Phone Number
Prefix	Range	Operator
010	2, 36~39, 46, 56, 66, 76, 82, 88, 90~98	Celcom
010	30~34, 83~87	XOX
010	35, 44~45, 55, 65	UniFi Mobile
010	40~41, 57~59	Celcom
010	42~43, 70~71, 89	Maxis
010	50~54, 77~81	Tune Talk
011	100~104	UniFi Mobile
011	105~109, 55, 8888	redONE
011	11, 21, 270~274, 28, 37, 39, 605~642, 8886, 8889	U Mobile
011	12	Maxis, ookyo
011	13, 205~209, 565~569, 575~579, 585~589, 595~599	XOX
011	140~144, 175~179, 23, 240~244, 25, 275~279	Maxis
011	145~149, 155~159, 19, 245~249, 29, 40~41, 54, 560~564	Celcom
011	150~154, 185~189, 35, 53	Tune Talk
011	16	DiGi, Tron
011	170~174, 30, 570~574, 580~584, 7	Yes 4G
011	180~184	Telekom Malaysia
011	200~204	Tron
011	26, 31, 33, 36, 51	DiGi
011	32	Altel
011	34	BuzzME
011	38	Friendi
012	2~9	Maxis
013	2~9	Celcom
014	2, 7	Maxis
014	3, 6, 9	DiGi
014	4	Tune Talk
014	5, 8	Celcom
016	2~9	DiGi
017	2~9	Maxis
018	12, 2, 31~32, 35~57, 66, 760~794, 87~91, 94~98	U Mobile
018	30, 33~4, 58~65, 67~71, 795~824, 92~93	Yes 4G
019	2~9	Celcom

Broadband Service (Data Only)
Prefix	Range	Operator
015 9	10~14, 16, 60~64	DiGi
015 9	20~29	Celcom

Telephony Service over IP (TSoIP) or Voice over IP (VoIP)
Prefix	Range	Operator
015 1		Onesmart Mobile
015 2		BluePack Network (5 GHz Internet & VoIP)
015 3		B&E Wireless Mobile
015 4	600~613	Telekom Malaysia
015 4	821	Time Fibre
015 4	840, 871~879	RedTone
015 4	841	Y-Max
015 4	848~849	Webe
015 4	851	Maxis
015 4	870	OCE

Note : Range is the first one, two or three number of the whole mobile phone number. Example :

         Prefix 010-, Range 2, is 010-2XX XXXX
         Prefix 011-, Range 11, is 011-11XX XXXX
         Prefix 011-, Range 155~159 is 011-155X XXXX to 011-159X XXXX
         X = 0 to 9

== Non-geographical short codes and special numbers ==
Prefix	Operator
100	General telephone services
101	Operator assistance – domestic calls. Used together with 100.
102	Service assistance, used in conjunction with 100.
103	Fixed telephone line directory assistance
104	Telegram services, no longer active since July 2012.
1051	Time announcement
1066	Earthquakes and Tsunami Alert Centre, No longer active, replaced with 1-300-22-1638.
108	Operator assistance for international calls.
112	International emergency number
120	Tune Talk IDD
121	Access the voice mailbox
12xx	Reserved number
1300-XX-XXXX	Local rate telephone number
1310	U Mobile IDD
13100	Celcom budget IDD
13188	TM SMS service
13200	Maxis IDD
13300	DiGi IDD
1315	TMNet dial-up internet service, No longer active.
1377X	General mass calling service, no longer active
141XX	currently unassigned
1500-XX-XXXX	Paging service, No longer active.
1508-XX-XXXX	Dial-up internet access service, No longer active.
1511	Jaring dial-up internet service, No longer active.
1512	Maxis dial-up internet service, no longer available.
1513	TMNet EZNet dial-up internet service, no longer active.
1515	TMNet dial-up internet service, No longer active.
1516	DiGi dial-up internet service, no longer available.
1517	Time Net dial-up internet service, now inactive.
1519	Celcom dial-up internet service, no longer active.
152X	ISDN dial-up internet service, no longer available.
15454	Electricity fault reporting, 15444 for Sabah and Labuan after renaming from SESB to Sabah Electric in October 2024.
15999	Talian Kasih, emotional support & counselling services, previously Talian Nur
1600-XR-XXXX	Premium-rate telephone number (planned)
1700-XX-XXXX	Personal numbering service
1800-XX-XXXX	Toll-free telephone number (free from fixed line, local rate from mobile)
18YXX	Long Distance Carrier Selection Code
1900-XX-XXXX	Multimedia service number
600-XX-XXXX	Audiotext hosting service and premium-rate telephone number (planned renumbering to 1–600)
991	Civil Defence Department emergency number, now replaced with 999
994	Fire brigade emergency number, now replaced with 999
997	National Scam Response Centre (NSRC)
999	Malaysian General Emergency Service (MERS), previously allocated to police

Note: R = 1 to 6, X = 0 to 9, Y = 1 to 9

== Mobile Number portability ==
Mobile number portability (MNP) was introduced on 1 October 2008 for mobile phone numbers in a bid to increase market competition. Thus, subscribers are allowed to retain their mobile numbers when they switch to another service provider. Therefore, the mobile number prefix only indicates the original service provider.

Number portability has not been offered for landlines, as Telekom Malaysia (TM) holds a monopoly on landlines except in Putrajaya and some areas in the Klang Valley.
