= List of display resolutions =

Various lists of display resolutions:

- List of common display resolutions
- Graphics display resolution

== See also ==
- Display resolution
