= Ninetology Black Pearl II =

Mobile phone model

- Manufacturer: Ninetology
- Series: Touch
- Availability by region: Malaysia
- Compatible networks: GSM 900 / 1800; GPRS/EDGE class B, multislot class 33; UMTS 900 / 2011; HSDPA Cat9, 10.2 Mbps
- Form factor: Touchscreen
- Dimensions: Width: 65.5 mm; Height: 129.0 mm; Thickness: 10.3 mm
- Weight: 139 g (5 oz)
- Operating system: Android Ice Cream Sandwich 4.0
- CPU: Dual Core 1.0 GHz
- Memory: 512 MB RAM; 4 GB ROM
- Storage: 4 GB internal memory (1GB available to end user)
- Removable storage: up to 32 GB microSDHC
- Battery: 1600 mAh Li-Ion battery (removable); micro USB and 2 mm DC plug charging
- Rear camera: 5.0 MP
- Front camera: 0.3 MP
- Display: Capacitive, IPS LCD 800x 480px WVGA, 4.0", 16M Colors
- Connectivity: WLAN IEEE 802.11 b/g/n (2.4 GHz); bluetooth 3.0; micro USB 2.0; 3.5 mm AV connector (audio in/out); Dual SIM card Capability; FM receiver
- Data inputs: Capacitive Multi-touch display; External functional touch pad keys
- Development status: Released 2012

The Ninetology Black Pearl II (I9400) is a smart mobile phone manufactured by Ninetology with dual SIM capabilities. It is a low-end smartphone, using a dual core (1.0 GHz) processor and runs on the Android Ice Cream Sandwich 4.0 Operating System.

The phone is offered sealed with a default SIM card from Malaysian telecommunications provider Digi.

== History ==
=== Release ===
The Ninetology Black Pearl II I9400 was announced in December 2012.

== Feature ==
=== Hardware ===
The Ninetology Black Pearl II I9400 has a dimension of 129.0 mm (H) X 65.5 mm (W) X 10.3 mm (T) and weighs 139 grams. A dual core 1.0 GHz processor is used to power the device. It has a 4.0 inch capacitive IPS LCD screen display with a WVGA (244 ppi pixel density) resolution of 800 X 480, displaying up to 16M colors.

It possesses a 5.0-megapixel rear camera with face detection function, a LED flash feature and an autofocus function, as well as a VGA front-facing camera.

The main SIM card slot is visible once the back cover is removed and can be accessed by removing the battery pack. The second SIM Card slot is located right below the main SIM card slot. The battery possesses a capacity of Li-Ion 1600 mAh.

Additional storage is available via a MicroSD card socket, which is certified to support up to 32 GB of additional storage.

=== Software ===
The Ninetology Black Pearl II I9400 is running on the Android Ice Cream Sandwich Operating System and is preloaded with a variety of applications:

- Web: Native Android Browser
- Social: Facebook, YouTube
- Media: Camera, Gallery, FM Radio, Music Player, Video Player,
- Personal Information Management: Calendar, Detail Contact Information
- Utilities: Calculator, Alarm Clock, Google Maps, News and Weather Application, Voice Recorder
