= Ninetology U9Z1+ =

- Manufacturer: Ninetology
- Series: Touch
- Availability by region: Malaysia
- Compatible networks: GSM 900 / 1800 MHz; WCDMA 900/2100MHz; GPRS/EDGE Class 12; HSDPA+ DL = Up to 42Mbps; UL = Up to 11.2Mbps
- Form factor: Touchscreen
- Dimensions: Width: 73.0 mm; Height: 144.5 mm; Thickness: 9.0 mm
- Weight: 158 g (6 oz)
- Operating system: Android Jelly Bean 4.2
- CPU: Quad core 1.2GHz
- GPU: PowerVR SGX544
- Memory: 1 GB RAM; 16 GB ROM
- Storage: 16 GB internal memory
- Removable storage: Micro SD Card, Supports up to 32GB
- Battery: 2000 mAh Li-Ion battery (removable); micro USB and 2 mm DC plug charging
- Rear camera: 13.0 MP
- Front camera: 5.0 MP
- Display: Capacitive Multi Touch Screen, IPS Display, Corning Gorilla Glass II, 1280 X 720ppx, 5.0"
- Connectivity: WLAN IEEE 802.11 b/g/n; Bluetooth 4.0; Micro USB 2.0; USB On-the-Go 1.3; 3.5 mm AV connector (audio in/out); Dual SIM card capability; FM receiver
- Data inputs: Capacitive multi-touch display; External functional touch pad keys
- Development status: Released 2013

Ninetology U9Z1+ (I9502) is a high end smartphone with dual SIM capabilities. It's powered by a MediaTek MT6589 quad-core (1.2 GHz) processor and runs on the Android Jelly Bean 4.2 operating system.

== History ==
=== Release ===
The U9Z1+ was announced during a launch event held at Hilton Kuala Lumpur, Malaysia on the 30th of July, 2013.

== Feature ==
=== Hardware ===
The Ninetology U9Z1+ has a dimension of 144.5 mm (H) X 73.0 mm (W) X 9.0 mm (T) and weighs 158 grams. The device is running on a MediaTek MT6589 quad-core 1.2 GHz processor that enables it to have dual SIM capability. Its Corning Gorilla Glass II screen sits on top of a 5.0-inch capacitive IPS touch screen display with a resolution of 1280 X 720p.

It possesses a 13.0-megapixel rear camera with a F2.2 aperture feature, HDR, face detection feature and continuous shot function, as well as a 5.0 MP front-facing camera.

The battery possesses a capacity of Li-Ion 2000 mAh and can last up to approximately 10 hours of talk time.

=== Software ===
The Ninetology U9Z1+ I9502 is running on the Android Jelly Bean Operating System and is pre-loaded with a variety of applications:

- Web: Native Android Browser
- Social: Facebook, YouTube, WeChat, Google+, Google Hangouts
- Media: Camera, Gallery, FM Radio, Music Player, Video Player,
- Personal Information Management: Calendar, Detail Contact Information
- Utilities: Calculator, Alarm Clock, Google Maps, News and Weather Application, Voice Recorder, Adobe Reader, NQ Mobile Security, NQ Valut, M Warranty
