= OnePlus Pad =

Android-based tablet computer manufactured by OnePlus

- Brand: OnePlus
- Manufacturer: OnePlus
- Type: Tablet computer
- Series: OnePlus
- Compatible networks: No cellular connectivity
- Form factor: Slate
- Color: Halo Green
- Dimensions: 258 mm (10.2 in) H 189.4 mm (7.46 in) W 6.5 mm (0.26 in) D
- Weight: 552 g (19.5 oz)
- Operating system: Android 13 with Oxygen OS 13.1
- System-on-chip: Mediatek Dimensity 9000 (4 nm)
- CPU: Octa-core (1x3.05 GHz Cortex-X2 & 3x2.85 GHz Cortex-A710 & 4x1.80 GHz Cortex-A510)
- GPU: Mali-G710 MC10
- Memory: 8 GB RAM
- Storage: 128 GB
- Removable storage: None
- SIM: Unsupported
- Battery: Li-Po 9510 mAh
- Charging: Fast charging 67W
- Rear camera: 13 MP; LED flash; 4K@30fps, 1080p@30ps, gyro-EIS
- Front camera: 8 MP; 1080p@30fps
- Display: 11.61 in (295 mm); 2000 x 2800 px resolution (~296 ppi density); IPS LCD, 1B colors, Dolby Vision, 144Hz, 500 nits (typ)
- External display: None
- Sound: Stereo speakers (4 speakers)
- Connectivity: Wi-Fi 802.11 a/b/g/n/ac/6, dual-band Bluetooth 5.3, A2DP, LE, aptX HD
- Data inputs: Multi-touch screen; USB Type-C 2.0; Accelerometer; Gyroscope; Compass; Color spectrum
- Water resistance: Unsupported
- Website: www.oneplus.com/us/oneplus-pad

The OnePlus Pad is an Android-based tablet computer designed, marketed, and manufactured by OnePlus. It was announced on February 7, 2023, and was released on April 28, 2023.

Preceded by None	OnePlus Pad; 2023	Succeeded by OnePlus Pad 2
