= Ninetology Vox =

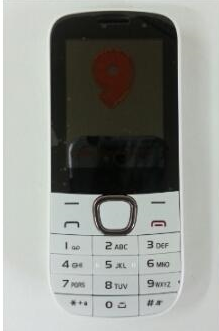
- Experiencing Differences.
- Manufacturer: Ninetology
- Series: Feature
- Availability by region: Malaysia
- Compatible networks: GSM 900/1800; GPRS/EDGE class B, multislot class 33
- Form factor: Keypad
- Dimensions: Width: 49.6 mm; Height: 115.6 mm; Thickness: 14.5 mm
- Weight: 88 g (3 oz)
- Operating system: -
- CPU: MT 6250 Single Core Processor (260 MHz)
- Memory: 64 MB RAM; 64 MB ROM
- Removable storage: up to 32 GB microSDHC
- Battery: 1200mAh Li-Ion battery (removable); micro USB and 2 mm DC plug charging
- Rear camera: 1.3 MP
- Front camera: -
- Display: IPS Display, 240 x 320, 2.4", Capable of displaying up to 65K colors
- Connectivity: WLAN IEEE 802.11 b/g/n (2.4 GHz); bluetooth 2.0; USB 1.1; 3.5 mm AV connector (audio in/out); FM receiver; Mobile TV
- Data inputs: External hardware keys
- Development status: Released 2012

The Ninetology Vox (C1240) is a dual-band GSM 900/1800 color mobile phone manufactured by Ninetology with dual SIM capabilities. It was announced in November 2012 via a campaign called VOX G.O.L.D Fund that aimed to raise donations funds for Yayasan Maha Karuna.

== Hardware Specifications ==
The Ninetology Vox (C1240) has an MT 6250 single core (260 MHz) processor. Its dimensions are 115.6 mm (H) x 49.6 mm (W) x 14.5 mm (T) and weighs 88 grams.

It possesses a 2.4-inch IPS display screen with a 240 x 320 resolution and is capable of producing up to 65K colors. It is also equipped with a 1.3 MP rear-facing camera.

The battery has a capacity of Li-Ion 1200 mAh, and additional storage is available via a MicroSD card socket, which is certified to support up to 8 GB of additional storage.

== VOX Gold ==
The VOX G.O.L.D Fund campaign organized by Ninetology aims to raise donations funds for Yayasan Maha Karuna. Ninetology does this by donating a large percentage of its accumulated sales from its Vox model to the organization.
