= Ninetology Insight =

- Manufacturer: Ninetology
- Series: Touch
- Availability by region: Malaysia
- Compatible networks: GSM 900/1800/; GPRS/EDGE class B, multislot class 33; UMTS 2011; HSDPA Cat9, 10.2 Mbps
- Form factor: Touchscreen
- Dimensions: Width: 66.5 mm; Height: 126.9 mm; Thickness: 10.8 mm
- Weight: 160 g (6 oz)
- Operating system: Android Ice Cream Sandwich 4.0
- CPU: Dual Core 1.0 GHz
- Memory: 512 MB RAM; 4 GB ROM
- Storage: 4 GB internal memory (1GB available to end user)
- Removable storage: up to 32 GB microSDHC
- Battery: 1800mAh Li-Ion battery (removable); micro USB and 2 mm DC plug charging
- Rear camera: 8.0 MP
- Front camera: 2.0 MP
- Display: Capacitive IPS Display, One Glass Solution, 480 x 800 (240 PPI pixel density), 4.3", Capable of displaying up to 16.7M colors
- Connectivity: WLAN IEEE 802.11 b/g/n (2.4 GHz); bluetooth 3.0; micro USB 2.0; 3.5 mm AV connector (audio in/out); FM receiver
- Data inputs: Capacitive Multi-touch display; External touch pad and hardware keys
- Development status: Released 2013

The Ninetology Insight (I9430) is a smart mobile phone manufactured by Ninetology with dual SIM capabilities. It is running on a dual core (1.0 GHz) processor and utilizes the Android Ice Cream Sandwich 4.0 Operating System.

== History ==
=== Release ===
The Ninetology Insight (I9430) was announced during the month of January, 2013.

== Feature ==
=== Hardware ===
The Ninetology Insight (I9430) has a dual core 1.0 GHz processor and a 4.3-inch capacitive IPS (196 ppi pixel density) display screen with a resolution of 480 X 800, capable of displaying up to 16.7M colors. It possesses a dimension of 126.9 mm (H) X 66.5 mm (W) X 10.8 mm (T) and weighs 160 grams.

It has an 8.0 MP rear camera with face detection function, a LED flash feature, HDR settings and an autofocus function, as well as a 2.0 MP front-facing camera.

The battery has a capacity of Li-Ion 1800 mAh.

Additional storage is available via a MicroSD card socket, which is certified to support up to 32 GB of additional storage.

=== Software ===
The Ninetology Insight (I9430) is running on the Android Ice Cream Sandwich 4.0 Operating System and is preloaded with a variety of applications:

- Web: Native Android Browser
- Social: Facebook, YouTube
- Media: Camera, Gallery, FM Radio, Music Player, Video Player,
- Personal Information Management: Calendar, Detail Contact Information
- Utilities: Calculator, Alarm Clock, Google Maps, Voice Recorder, M-Warranty
