= Ninetology =

Malaysian smartphone manufacturer

Ninetology Sdn Bhd
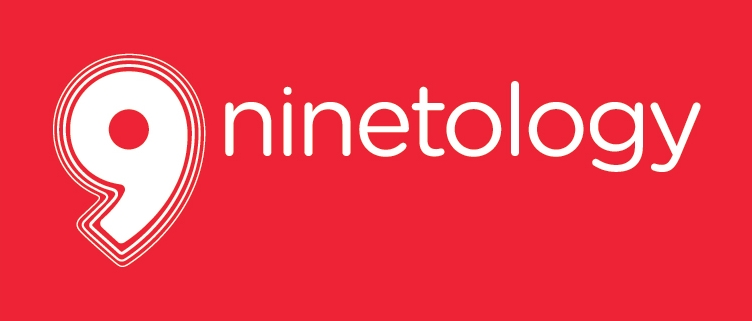
- Company type: Private
- Industry: Telecommunications
- Founded: 2012
- Headquarters: Shah Alam, Selangor, Malaysia
- Key people: Sean Ng(Founder); Marco Beh(Founder); Shian(Founder)
- Products: Mobile phones
- Parent: Avaxx Corporation
- Website: Ninetology Official Website

Ninetology is a Malaysian smart phone manufacturer. It was founded in April 2012 by Sean Ng, Marco Beh and Shian and ceased operation in November 2014. It has been taken over by Avaxx Corporation (Malaysian Microsoft distributor) in January 2015.

== Business ==
=== Accomplishment ===
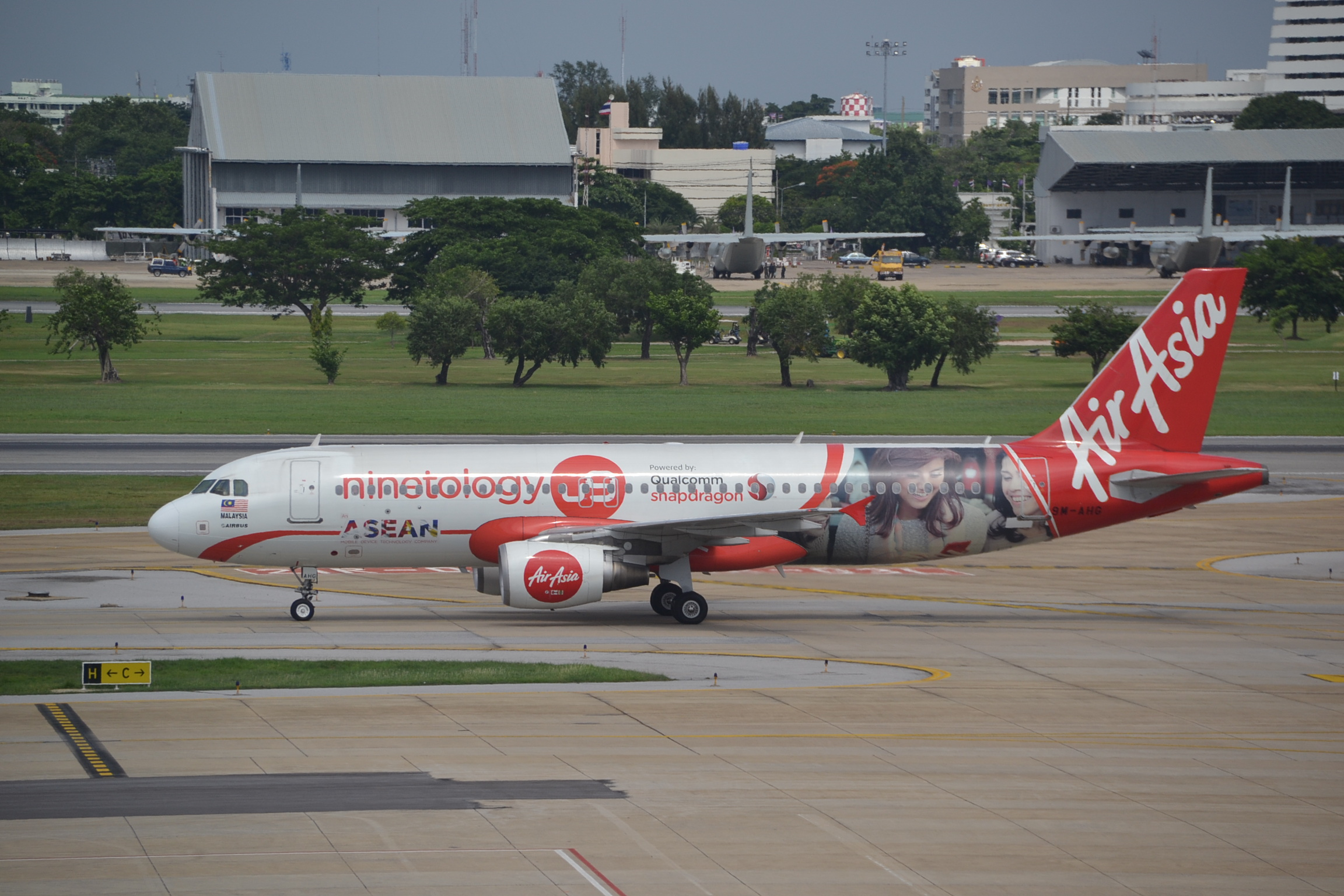
Ninetology and Qualcomm livery on AirAsia aircraft in 2014.

As of March 2014, Ninetology has sold 1 million devices and have also expanded to Indonesia in September 2013. It has recorded a MYR 180 million in revenue and a 12% Malaysian market share in 2013. Ninetology partners with AirAsia in 2014 for the latter to sport Ninetology and Qualcomm livery on their aircraft to mark Ninetology expansion plan to other ASEAN countries which include Philippines, Thailand, Cambodia, Myanmar and Vietnam.

=== Decline ===
According to International Data Corporation (IDC), 2014 was not a good year for Ninetology due to stiff competition of cheaper phones from China. In September 2014, it is reported that the founders of Ninetology have resigned from their post.

== Models ==
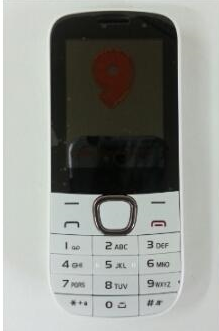
Ninetology Vox

- Ninetology Black Pearl II
- Ninetology Insight
- Ninetology Outlook Pure (tablet)
- Ninetology Pearl Mini
- Ninetology Stealth II
- Ninetology U9X1
- Ninetology U9Z1
- Ninetology U9Z1+
- Ninetology Vox
