= OnePlus Pad 2 =

Android-based tablet computer manufactured by OnePlus

- Brand: OnePlus
- Manufacturer: OnePlus
- Type: Tablet computer
- Series: OnePlus
- Compatible networks: No cellular connectivity
- Form factor: Slate
- Color: Nimbus Gray
- Dimensions: 268.66 mm (10.577 in) H 195.06 mm (7.680 in) W 6.49 mm (0.256 in) D
- Weight: 584 g (20.6 oz)
- Operating system: Android 14 with Oxygen OS 14.1
- System-on-chip: Qualcomm Snapdragon 8 Gen 3
- CPU: Octa-core
- GPU: Adreno 750 @ 903MHz
- Memory: 8/12 GB RAM
- Storage: 128/256 GB
- Removable storage: None
- SIM: Unsupported
- Battery: Li-Po 9510 mAh
- Charging: Fast charging 67W
- Rear camera: 13 MP; LED flash; 4K@30fps, 1080p@30ps, gyro-EIS
- Front camera: 8 MP; 1080p@30fps
- Display: 12.1 in (310 mm); 2120 x 3000 px resolution (~303 ppi density); IPS LCD, 1B colors, Dolby Vision, 144Hz, 900 nits (typ)
- External display: None
- Sound: Stereo speakers (6 speakers)
- Connectivity: Wi-Fi 7 Bluetooth 5.4
- Data inputs: Multi-touch screen; USB Type-C USB3.2 Gen1; Accelerometer; Gyroscope; Compass; Color spectrum
- Water resistance: Unsupported
- Website: www.oneplus.com/us/oneplus-pad

The OnePlus Pad 2 is an Android-based tablet computer designed, marketed, and manufactured by OnePlus. It was announced on July 16, 2024.

== Models ==
- OnePlus Pad 2 • Qualcomm Snapdragon 8 Gen 3 (SM8650-AB)

• CPU: Octa-core (1x 3.3 GHz Cortex-X4 + 3x 3.2 GHz Cortex-A720

+ 2x 3.0 GHz Cortex-A720 + 2x 2.3 GHz Cortex-A520)

• GPU: Adreno 750
• Memory: 128GB / 8GB RAM, 256GB / 12GB RAM (UFS 3.1)

- OnePlus Pad 2 Pro • Qualcomm Snapdragon 8 Elite (SM8750-AB)

• CPU: Octa-core (2x 4.32 GHz Oryon V2 Phoenix L

+ 6x 3.53 GHz Oryon V2 Phoenix M)

• GPU: Adreno 830
• Memory: 256GB / 8GB RAM, 256GB / 12GB RAM,
512GB / 12GB RAM, 512GB / 16GB RAM (UFS 4.0)

Preceded by OnePlus Pad	OnePlus Pad 2; 2024	Succeeded by OnePlus Pad 2 Pro (2025)
