= Glospace SGK-70 =

Automotive navigation system

- Manufacturer: GLOSPACE
- Type: PNA (Personal navigation assistant)
- Released: December 27, 2007
- Operating system: Windows CE 5.0
- CPU: Samsung S3C2440 processor at 400 MHz
- Memory: 64Mb SDRAM
- Storage: SD
- Display: 480х234 resolution, 7" TFT LCD touchscreen
- Input: Audio Video
- Connectivity: 12 channel GLONASS receiver 12 channel GPS receiver USB 1.1 Host and Client
- Power: 12v 2A
- Dimensions: 188x120x35 mm
- Weight: 400g

Glospace SGK-70 is the world's first Automotive navigation system that is able to navigate using both GPS and GLONASS signals.

Glospace is a brand of НИИ КП ("Научно-исследовательский институт космического приборостроения", the Russian Institute of Space Device Engineering).

Its hardware part is based on 24 channel NAVIOR-24 (СН-4701) chip that handles signals of both systems (12 channels per each system). Its software part is based on ПалмГИСGPS (PalmGISGPS) that runs on Windows CE 5.0.
