= TXGA =

Computer display standard

TXGA, or Tesselar eXtended Graphics Array is a computer graphics resolution of 1920 x 1400 pixels, with an aspect ratio of 7:5, first defined by UK based Equipe Simulation in 2007 and demonstrated at the ITEC conference in April of the same year. TXGA was created explicitly to meet the demands of modern simulation, offering higher resolution than UXGA (1600 x 1200) while remaining computationally less expensive than QXGA (2048 x 1536). TXGA was further defined within a white paper presented at the World Aviation Training Conference and Tradeshow (WATS) held annually. The first commercial implementation of TXGA, the Contour 600 digital projector, is now available.
