= List of common display resolutions =

This chart shows the most common display resolutions, with the color of each resolution type indicating the display ratio (e.g., red indicates a 4:3 ratio).

This article lists computer monitor, television, digital film, and other graphics display resolutions that are in common use. Most of them use certain preferred numbers.

== Computer graphics ==
Pixel aspect ratio (PAR)
The horizontal to vertical ratio of each pixel.
Storage aspect ratio (SAR)
The horizontal to vertical ratio of solely the number of pixels in each direction. (Note: LCD panels' resolutions are often quoted in terms of raw subpixels, misnamed "pixels" in manufacturer's specifications. Each real pixel includes one subpixel for each of three colors, so calling subpixels "pixels" inflates the claimed resolution by a factor of three. This bit of marketing obfuscation is calculated as horizontal resolution × vertical resolution × 3. For example: 640 × 480 VGA is 921,600 subpixels, or 307,200 pixels, 800 × 600 SVGA is 1,440,000 subpixels, or 480,000 pixels, and 1024 × 768 XGA is 2,359,296 subpixels, but only 786,432 full-color pixels.)
Display aspect ratio (DAR)
The combination (which occurs by multiplication) of both the pixel aspect ratio and storage aspect ratio giving the aspect ratio as experienced by the viewer.

Computer and handheld screens
Designation	Usage	W	(px)	H	Aspect ratio			Total pixels
Designation	Usage	W	(px)	H	Storage	Display	Pixel	Total pixels
0.03K1	Micro Bit	5	×	5	1∶1	1∶1	1∶1	25
0.06K1	Used as a block of many lossy compression formats	8	×	8	1∶1	1∶1	1∶1	64
0.26K1	Microvision, Minecraft standard textures	16	×	16	1∶1	1∶1	1∶1	256
0.36K1	Small web page icons	24	×	15	8∶5	1∶1	1∶1	360
10p	Timex Datalink USB	42	×	10	21∶5	1∶1	5:9	420
0.77K1	Some thermal imagery cameras	32	×	24	4∶3	1∶1	1∶1	768
OpenComputers basic resolution	Resolution display supported with PCs with videocard level 1:	50	×	16	25∶8	4∶3	32:75	800
1.02K1	PocketStation	32	×	32	1∶1	1∶1	1∶1	1,024
1.20K3	Etch A Sketch Animator	40	×	30	4∶3	4∶3	1∶1	1,200
1.34K1	Epson RC-20	42	×	32	21∶16	1∶1	16:21	1,344
1.54K2	GameKing I (GM-218), VMU	48	×	32	3∶2	3∶2	1∶1	1,536
2.00K3	Ever DOS computers	80	×	25	16∶5	4∶3	5:12	2,000
2.40K3	Some DOS computers	80	×	30	8∶3	4∶3	1:2	2,400
2.40K2	Etch A Sketch Animator 2000	60	×	40	3∶2	3∶2	1∶1	2,400
2.88K5	Thumby (console)	72	×	40	9∶5	7∶5	7:9	2,880
3.07K3	Some mobile phones	64	×	48	4∶3	4∶3	1∶1	3,072
4.03K7∶4	Nokia 3210 and many other early Nokia Phones	84	×	48	7∶4	2∶1	8:7	4,032
4.10K1	Hartung Game Master	64	×	64	1∶1	1∶1	1∶1	4,096
4.25K3	Ever DOS computers 2x	170	×	25	34∶5	4∶3	10:51	4,250
4.61K1	Field Technology CxMP smart watch	72	×	64	9∶8	1∶1	8:9	4,608
4.61K1	Montblanc e-Strap	128	×	36	32∶9	1∶1	9:32	4,608
4.80K1	Epoch Game Pocket Computer	75	×	64	75∶64	1∶1	64:75	4,800
6.00K3.75	Entex Adventure Vision	150	×	40	15∶4	15:4	1∶1	6,000
6.14K2	First graphing calculators: Casio fx-7000G, TI-81	96	×	64	3∶2	3∶2	1∶1	6,144
6.14K2	Pokémon Mini	96	×	64	3∶2	3∶2	1∶1	6,144
6.14K2	TRS-80	128	×	48	8∶3	3∶2	9:16	6,144
6.24K2	Early Nokia colour screen phones (Nokia 3510i) and some nokia monochrome screen phones (Nokia 1100)	96	×	65	96∶65	3∶2	65:64	6,240
6.53KA	Ruputer	102	×	64	51∶32	8∶5	1.004	6,528
6.53K1.412	Some Nokia CDMA phones and some Nokia budget phones	96	×	68	24∶17	√2:1	17√2:24	6,528
7.56K2	Pokémon Mini	108	×	70	54∶35	3∶2	0.972	7,560
8.08K4	Sony Ericsson T68i, T300, T310 and other early colour and black and white screen phones	101	×	80	101∶80	5∶4	0.99	8,080
8.19K2∶1	Arduboy	128	×	64	2∶1	2∶1	1∶1	8,192
9.22K1	MetaWatch Strata & Frame watches	96	×	96	1∶1	1∶1	1∶1	9,216
12.29K2	Pokémon Mini	128	×	96	4∶3	3∶2	1.125	12,288
MMS-Small	Lowest size recommended for use with 3GPP video transmitted to MMS to/from cellular phones.:	128	×	96	4∶3	4∶3	1∶1	12,288
15.36K3.75	Atari Portfolio, TRS-80 Model 100	240	×	64	15∶4	3.75	1∶1	15,360
16.32KA	Atari Lynx	160	×	102	80∶51	8∶5	1.02	16,320
SQVGA	Sony SmartWatch, Sifteo cubes, early color screen phones (square display), PICO-8	128	×	128	1∶1	1∶1	1∶1	16,384
20.48K0.8	Samsung feature phones, e.g., Samsung SGH-S150G and other feature phones such as MobiWire Nakai	128	×	160	4∶5	4:5	1∶1	20,480
72p	One tenth of 720p:	128	×	72	16∶9	16∶9	1∶1	9,216
108p	One tenth of 1080p:	192	×	108	16∶9	16∶9	1∶1	20,736
QQVGA	Quarter Quarter VGA: Nintendo Game Boy Advance LoRes, and some web-cameras and early cellular phones with color display. Lowest commonly user video resolution.	160	×	120	4∶3	4∶3	1∶1	19,200
23.04K1.111	Nintendo Game Boy (GB), Game Boy Color (GBC); Sega Game Gear (GG)	160	×	144	10∶9	10:9	1∶1	23,040
144p	4:3 YouTube video at 144p:	192	×	144	4∶3	4∶3	1∶1	27,648
Wide 144p	One tenth of 1440p. The lowest resolution on YouTube since 2013 and RuTube:	256	×	144	16∶9	16∶9	1∶1	36,864
24.19K0.857	Pebble E-Paper Watch	144	×	168	6∶7	6:7	1∶1	24,192
24.32K1.053	Neo Geo Pocket Color	160	×	152	20∶19	20:19	1∶1	24,320
25.60K1	Palm LoRes	160	×	160	1∶1	1∶1	1∶1	25,600
OC PC with videocard 3-level and 3-level monitor	OpenComputers computers used this resolution with 3-level videocards and 3-level monitors:	160	×	50	16∶5	4∶3	0.417	8,000
26.88K3	Apple II HiRes (6 color) and Apple IIe Double HiRes (16 color), grouping subpixels	140	×	192	35∶48	4∶3	1.828	26,880
20.48K4	LDTV 5:4 resolution 160x128	160	×	128	5∶4	5∶4	1∶1	20,480
32.00K3	VIC-II multicolor, IBM PCjr 16-color, Amstrad CPC 16-color	160	×	200	4∶5	4∶3	5∶3	32,000
32.26K9	WonderSwan	224	×	144	14∶9	14∶9	1∶1	32,256
32.64K9	TIC-80	240	×	136	30∶17	16∶9	1.007	32,640
QCIF webcam	Approximately one-sixth analogue PAL (one-half horizontal, one-third vertical). Similar to the size recommended for "medium" quality MMS video:	176	×	144	11∶9	11:9, 4:3	1∶1	25,344
36.61K13∶11	Nokia Series 60 smartphones (Nokia 7650, plus First and Second Edition models and Some Third Edition models only)	208	×	176	13∶11	13∶11	1∶1	36,608
HQVGA	Half QVGA: Nintendo Game Boy Advance	240	×	160	3∶2	3∶2	1∶1	38,400
38.72K4	Older Java MIDP devices like Sony Ericsson K600	220	×	176	5∶4	5∶4	1∶1	38,720
40.96K3	BBC Micro 20 column modes	160	×	256	5∶8	4∶3	2.133	40,960
44.64K3	Apple II HiRes 3 colors	180	×	248	45∶62	4∶3	1.837	44,640
43.26K1	Nokia 5500 Sport, Nokia 6230i, Nokia 8800	208	×	208	1∶1	1∶1	1∶1	43,264
49.15K3	TMS9918 modes 1 (e.g. TI-99/4A) and 2, ZX Spectrum, MSX, Sega Master System, Nintendo DS (each screen)	256	×	192	4∶3	4∶3	1∶1	49,152
53.76K3	Apple II HiRes (1 bit per pixel)	280	×	192	35∶24	4∶3	0.914	53,760
54.27K3	MSX2	256	×	212	64∶53	4∶3	1.104	54,272
55.30K1	Samsung Gear Fit	432	×	128	27∶8	1∶1	0.296	55,296
57.34K3	Nintendo Entertainment System, outputted version of NTSC for Super Nintendo Entertainment System, Sega Mega Drive	256	×	224	8∶7	4∶3	7∶6	57,344
57.60K1	Apple iPod Nano 6G, Palm (PDA)	240	×	240	1∶1	1∶1	1∶1	57,600
61.44K3	PlayStation (e.g. Rockman Complete Works), outputted PAL version for Nintendo Entertainment System.	256	×	240	16∶15	4∶3	5∶4	61,440
61.44K6	Atari 8-bit computers PAL	320	×	192	5∶3	5∶3	1∶1	61,440
61.44K5∶3	Atari 8-bit computers NTSC	320	×	192	5∶3	50:35	6:7	61,440
Color Graphics Adapter (CGA)	CGA 4-color, ATM 16 color, Atari ST 16 color, Nintendo 64 LoRes, Commodore 64, HiRes VIC-II Hires, Amiga OCS NTSC Lowres, Apple IIGS LoRes, MCGA, Amstrad CPC 4-color	320	×	200	8∶5	4∶3	0.833	64,000
65.54K1	Elektronika BK	256	×	256	1∶1	1∶1	1∶1	65,536
65.54K3	Sinclair QL	256	×	256	1∶1	4∶3	4∶3	65,536
qnHD	Quarter of nHD (360p):	320	×	180	16∶9	16∶9	1∶1	57,600
66.56K2	UIQ 2.x based smartphones	320	×	208	20∶13	3∶2	0.975	66,560
71.68K2	Sega Mega Drive, Sega Nomad, Neo Geo AES	320	×	224	10∶7	3∶2	1.05	71,680
QVGA	Quarter VGA: Apple iPod Nano 3G, Nintendo Entertainment System HiRes, Super Nintendo Entertainment System, PlayStation, Nintendo 64, GameCube, Nintendo 3DS (lower screen), VGA "Mode X", Used in some webcams and for video recording in early-budget digital cameras and cameraphones and low-end smartphone screens. Original YouTube resolution. Maximum recommended size for "large" MMS videos, Apple Newton	320	×	240	4∶3	4∶3	1∶1	76,800
81.92K3	Acorn BBC 40 column modes, Amiga OCS PAL Lowres, GameCube	320	×	256	5∶4	4∶3	1.066	81,920
216p	Casio fx-CG50, fx-CG10	384	×	216	16∶9	16∶9	1∶1	82,944
86.02K3	Capcom CP System (CPS, CPS2, CPS3) arcade system boards	384	×	224	12∶7	4∶3	0.778	86,016
88.32K3	PlayStation (e.g. X-Men vs. Street Fighter)	368	×	240	23∶15	4∶3	0.869	88,320
89.28K3	Super Nintendo Entertainment System	372	×	240	31∶20	4∶3	0.86	89,280
90.24K9	Apple iPod Nano 5G	376	×	240	47∶30	14∶9	0.993	90,240
92.48K0.8	Apple Watch 38mm	272	×	340	4∶5	4:5	1∶1	92,480
WQVGA	Wide QVGA: Common on Windows Mobile 6 handsets, Nintendo 3DS (upper screen in 2D mode), Playdate (console)	400	×	240	5∶3	5∶3	1∶1	96,000
222p	Used in low-resolution widescreen videos on Facebook.:	400	×	200	2∶1	16∶9	1∶1	80,000
98.30K3	Timex Sinclair 2068, Timex Computer 2048	512	×	192	8∶3	4∶3	0.5	98,304
100.35K3	IGS PolyGame Master arcade system board	448	×	224	2∶1	4∶3	0.667	100,352
102.40K1	Palm (PDA) HiRes, Samsung Galaxy Gear	320	×	320	1∶1	1∶1	1∶1	102,400
WQVGA	Wide QVGA: Apple iPod Nano 7G	432	×	240	9∶5	9∶5	1∶1	103,680
107.52K3	Apple IIe Double Hires (1 bit per pixel)	560	×	192	35∶12	4∶3	0.457	107,520
108.00K3	TurboExpress	400	×	270	40∶27	4∶3	0.9	108,000
108.54K3	MSX2	512	×	212	128∶53	4∶3	0.552	108,544
110.59K3	Common Intermediate Format	384	×	288	4∶3	4∶3	1∶1	110,592
360p	Uncommon, used in some lower-mid-market smartphone screens, as an intermediate screen resolution for some 1990s videogames, and in Scratch. It is a 4:3 version of 360p:	480	×	360	4∶3	4∶3	1∶1	172,800
QuickTime Fioe Format, 320p	Used for .MOV files recorded with iPhone cameras:	568	×	320	71∶40	16∶9	1.001	181,760
WQVGA*	Variant used commonly for portable DVD players, digital photo frames, GPS receivers and devices such as the Kenwood DNX-5120 and Glospace SGK-70; often marketed as "16:9"	480	×	234	80∶39	16∶9	0.866	112,320
qSVGA	Quarter SVGA: Super Nintendo Entertainment System Selectable in some PC shooters	400	×	300	4∶3	4∶3	1∶1	120,000
120.00K3	Teletext and Viewdata 40×25 character screens (PAL non-interlaced)	480	×	250	48∶25	4∶3	0.694	120,000
121.68K0.8	Apple Watch 42mm	312	×	390	4∶5	4:5	1∶1	121,680
WQVGA	NTSC widescreen, current YouTube 240p mode; screen resolution of some budget portable DVD players. Roughly one-third full NTSC-resolution (half verical, two thirds horizontal).:	426	×	240	71∶40	16∶9	1∶1	102,240
122.88K3	PlayStation (e.g. Tekken and Tekken 2)	512	×	240	32∶15	4∶3	0.625	122,880
SVCD	Super Video CD:	480	×	480	1∶1	1∶1	1∶1	230,400
SVCD	Super Video CD 576p:	480	×	576	5∶6	11∶9	1.466	276,480
480i	480i horizontal blanking cropped:	704	×	480	22∶15	4∶3	0.909	337,920
576i	576i horizontal blanking cropped:	704	×	576	11∶9	4∶3	12∶11	405,504
480i	480i:	655	×	480	131∶96	4∶3	0.977	314,400
480i ≈16.5:9	480i with ≈16.5:9:	873	×	480	291∶160	16∶9	0.977	419,040
SIF	NTSC-standard VCD and super-long-play DVD. Narrow/tall pixels:	352	×	240	22∶15	4∶3	0.909	84,480
128.00K3	Amiga OCS NTSC Lowres interlaced	320	×	400	4∶5	4∶3	5∶3	128,000
Color Graphics Adapter (CGA)	Atari ST 4 color, ATM, CGA mono, Amiga OCS NTSC Hires, Apple IIGS HiRes, Nokia Series 80 smartphones, Amstrad CPC 2-color	640	×	200	16∶5	4∶3	0.417	128,000
130.56K9	Sony PlayStation Portable, Zune HD, Neo Geo X	480	×	272	30∶17	16∶9	1.007	130,560
131.07K2∶1	Elektronika BK, Poly-Play	512	×	256	2∶1	2∶1	1∶1	131,072
131.07K3	Sinclair QL	512	×	256	2∶1	4∶3	0.667	131,072
288p	One fifth of 1440p. Widescreen of 288p resolution:	512	×	288	16∶9	16∶9	1∶1	147,456
0.15M13∶11	Nokia Series 60 smartphones (E60, E70, N80, N90)	416	×	352	13∶11	13∶11	1∶1	146,432
HVGA	Palm Tungsten T3, Apple iPhone, HTC Dream, Palm (PDA) HiRES+	480	×	320	3∶2	3∶2	1∶1	153,600
HVGA	Handheld PC	640	×	240	8∶3	8:3	1∶1	153,600
0.15M3	PlayStation, GameCube	640	×	240	8∶3	4∶3	0.5	153,600
0.16M3	Acorn BBC 80 column modes, Amiga OCS PAL Hires	640	×	256	5∶2	4∶3	0.533	163,840
0.18M2	Black & white Macintosh (9")	512	×	342	256∶171	3∶2	1.002	175,104
0.18M3	PlayStation (e.g. Tekken 3) (interlaced)	368	×	480	23∶30	4∶3	1.739	176,640
0.19M3	Sega Model 1 (e.g. Virtua Fighter) and Model 2 (e.g. Daytona USA) arcade system boards	496	×	384	31∶24	4∶3	1.032	190,464
0.19M6	Nintendo 3DS (upper screen in 3D mode: 2× 400 × 240, one for each eye)	800	×	240	10∶3	5∶3	0.5	192,000
0.20M3	Macintosh LC (12")/Color Classic (also selectable in many PC shooters)	512	×	384	4∶3	4∶3	1∶1	196,608
0.20M2∶1	Nokia Series 90 smartphones (7700, 7710)	640	×	320	2∶1	2∶1	1∶1	204,800
EGA	Enhanced Graphics Adapter, Apple Macintosh	640	×	350	64∶35	4∶3	0.729	224,000
0.23M9	nHD, used by Nokia 5800, Nokia 5530, Nokia X6, Nokia N97, Nokia N8	640	×	360	16∶9	16∶9	1∶1	230,400
0.24M3	Teletext and Viewdata 40×25 character screens (PAL interlaced)	480	×	500	24∶25	4∶3	1.389	240,000
0.25M3	Namco System 12 arcade system board (e.g. Soulcalibur, Tekken 3, Tekken Tag Tournament) (interlaced)	512	×	480	16∶15	4∶3	5∶4	245,760
GFGA	GlebFone Graphics Array:	640	×	512	5∶4	5∶4	1∶1	327,680
0.25M3	HGC	720	×	348	60∶29	4∶3	0.644	250,560
0.35M2	NTSC	720	×	480	3∶2	3∶2	1∶1	345,600
0.25M3	MDA	720	×	350	72∶35	4∶3	0.648	252,000
0.26M3	Atari ST mono, Amiga OCS NTSC Hires interlaced	640	×	400	8∶5	4∶3	0.833	256,000
0.26M3	Apple Lisa	720	×	364	180∶91	4∶3	0.674	262,080
SGFGA	Super-GlebFone Graphics Array:	848	×	640	ρ∶1	4∶3	1∶1	542,720
0.28M2.273	Nokia E90 Communicator	800	×	352	25∶11	25:11	1∶1	281,600
0.29M4	Some older monitors	600	×	480	5∶4	5∶4	1∶1	288,000
VGA	Video Graphics Array:MCGA (in monochome), Nintendo 3DS lower screen HiRes, GameCube, Sun-1 color, PlayStation (e.g. Tobal No.1 and Ehrgeiz), Nintendo 64, (e.g. various Expansion Pak enhanced games), 6th Generation Consoles, Nintendo Wii	640	×	480	4∶3	4∶3	1∶1	307,200
0.29M9	400p 9:5	720	×	400	9∶5	9∶5	1∶1	288,000
0.41M3	PAL, SECAM	720	×	576	5∶4	4∶3	1.066	414,720
0.33M3	Amiga OCS PAL Hires interlaced	640	×	512	5∶4	4∶3	1.066	327,680
WVGA	Wide VGA	768	×	480	8∶5	8∶5	1∶1	368,640
4:3 PAL	4:3 PAL:	768	×	576	4∶3	4∶3	1∶1	442,368
576i	576i:	788	×	576	197∶144	4∶3	0.974	453,888
WGA	Wide VGA: List of mobile phones with WVGA display	800	×	480	5∶3	5∶3	1∶1	384,000
W-PAL	Wide PAL	848	×	480	53∶30	16∶9	1.006	407,040
FWVGA	List of mobile phones with FWVGA display	854	×	480	427∶240	16∶9	0.999	409,920
SVGA	Super VGA Nintendo Wii, Nintendo 64 HiRes, GameCube HiRes	800	×	600	4∶3	4∶3	1∶1	480,000
640p	640p with 5:3 aspect ratio:	800	×	640	5∶4	5∶4	1∶1	512,000
qHD	Quarter FHD: AACS ICT, HRHD, Motorola Atrix 4G, Sony XEL-1	960	×	540	16∶9	16∶9	1∶1	518,400
0.52M3	Apple Macintosh Half Megapixel	832	×	624	4∶3	4∶3	1∶1	519,168
0.58MA	Wide SVGA 16:10	960	×	600	8∶5	8∶5	1∶1	576,000
0.52M9	PlayStation Vita (PSV)	960	×	544	30∶17	16∶9	1.007	522,240
0.59M9	PAL 16:9	1024	×	576	16∶9	16∶9	1∶1	589,824
576i	576i:	1050	×	576	175∶96	16∶9	0.975	604,800
DVGA	Double VGA: Apple iPhone 4S, 4th Generation iPod Touch	960	×	640	3∶2	3∶2	1∶1	614,400
XGFGA	eXtended GlebFone Graphics Array:	960	×	768	5∶4	5∶4	1∶1	737,280
XGFGA+	eXtended GlebFone Graphics Array Plus:	1080	×	864	5∶4	5∶4	1∶1	933,120
SXGFGA	Super eXtended GlebFone Graphics Array:	1280	×	1024	5∶4	5∶4	1∶1	1,310,720
SXGFGA 4:3	Super eXtended GlebFone Graphics Array:	1366	×	1024	4∶3	4∶3	1∶1	1,398,784
UXGFGA	Ultra eXtended GlebFone Graphics Array:	1536	×	1280	6∶5	6∶5	1∶1	1,966,080
WSVGA	Wide SVGA: 10" netbooks	1024	×	600	128∶75	16∶9	1.041	614,400
0.86M6	720p 5:3	1200	×	720	5∶3	5∶3	1∶1	864,000
0.60M6	WSVGA 5:3	1000	×	600	5∶3	5∶3	1∶1	600,000
0.66MA	Variation of WSVGA	1024	×	640	8∶5	8∶5	1∶1	655,360
FWSVGA	Full Wide Super Video Graphics Array:	1064	×	600	133∶75	16∶9	1∶1	638,400
XGA 800p	800p with 4:3 aspect ratio:	1064	×	800	4∶3	4∶3	1∶1	851,200
WSVGA+	WSVGA+ or WXGA minus is a resolution display with aspect ratio 3:2:	1024	×	672	32∶21	3∶2	1∶1	688,128
960H	960H resolution, aspect ratio 5:3:	960	×	576	5∶3	5∶3	1∶1	552,960
0.69M3	Panasonic DVCPRO100 for 50/60 Hz over 720p - SMPTE Resolution	960	×	720	4∶3	4∶3	1∶1	691,200
0.73M9	Apple iPhone 5, iPhone 5S, iPhone 5C, iPhone SE (1st)	1136	×	640	71∶40	16∶9	1.001	727,040
CIF/SIF (625)	PAL-standard VCD / super-long-play DVD. Wide/short pixels. Also a common resolution in early webcams / video conferencing and in advanced feature phones and smartphones of mid-2000s (ca 2006):	352	×	288	11∶9	11:9, 4:3	1∶1	101,376
0.73M9	Occasional Chromebook resolution with 96 DPI; see HP Chromebook 14A G5.	1138	×	640	16∶9	16∶9	0.999	728,320
XGA	Extended Graphics Array:Common on 14″/15″ TFTs and the Apple iPad	1024	×	768	4∶3	4∶3	1∶1	786,432
0.82M3	Sun-1 monochrome	1024	×	800	32∶25	4∶3	1.041	819,200
0.88M1.185	Some SPARC computer monitors	1024	×	864	32∶27	6∶5	1.013	884,736
0.83MA	Supported by some GPUs, monitors, and games	1152	×	720	8∶5	8∶5	1∶1	829,440
0.88M2	Apple PowerBook G4 (original Titanium version)	1152	×	768	3∶2	3∶2	1∶1	884,736
720p Clean Aperture	Clean aperture resolution:	1248	×	702	16∶9	16∶9	1∶1	876,096
WXGA	Wide XGA:Minimum, 720p Nintendo Wii U, Nintendo Switch HDTV	1280	×	720	16∶9	16∶9	1∶1	921,600
720p 5:3	5:3 version of 720p:	1200	×	720	5∶3	5∶3	1∶1	864,000
HD 25:16	HD 768p with 25:16 aspect ratio:	1200	×	768	25∶16	25∶16	1∶1	921,600
WXGA	Wide-XGA 3:2:	1200	×	800	3∶2	3∶2	1∶1	960,000
XGA+ 900p	900p with 4:3 aspect ratio:	1200	×	900	4∶3	4∶3	1∶1	1,080,000
0.93M3	NeXT MegaPixel Display	1120	×	832	35∶26	4∶3	0.99	931,840
XGA+ 7:5	7:5 version of 840p:	1200	×	840	10∶7	7∶5	1∶1	1,008,000
WXGA	Wide XGA:Average, BrightView Nintendo Wii U, Nintendo Switch	1280	×	768	5∶3	5∶3	1∶1	983,040
XGA+	Apple XGA, (Note: Apple Computer 1 megapixel standard) eXtended Graphics Array Plus	1152	×	864	4∶3	4∶3	1∶1	995,328
1.00M9	Apple iPhone 6, iPhone 6S, iPhone 7, iPhone 8, iPhone SE (2nd)	1334	×	750	667∶375	16∶9	0.999	1,000,500
WXGA	Wide XGA:Maximum Nintendo Wii U, Nintendo Switch, Steam Deck	1280	×	800	8∶5	8∶5	1∶1	1,024,000
1.04M32∶25	Sun-2 Prime Monochrome or Color Video, also common in Sun-3 and Sun-4 workstations	1152	×	900	32∶25	32∶25	1∶1	1,036,800
1.05M1∶1	Network Computing Devices	1024	×	1024	1∶1	1∶1	1∶1	1,048,576
WXGA HD	Standardized HDTV 720p/1080i displays or "HD ready", used in most cheaper notebooks Nintendo Wii U	1366	×	768	683∶384	16∶9	0.999	1,049,088
FWXGA	FWXGA version with possible width can be divided to 8:	1360	×	768	85∶48	16∶9	1∶1	1,044,480
WXGA+ 864p 16:10	WXGA+ 1384x864:	1384	×	864	173∶108	8∶5	1∶1	1,195,776
0.69M1B	Cinematic 21:9 resolution for 1280x720p	1280	×	536	21½∶9	21∶9	0.992	686,080
900p 3:2	900p with 3:2 aspect ratio:	1366	×	900	683∶450	1.517:1	1∶1	1,229,400
DCI 720p	DCI 720p resolution:	1366	×	720	683∶360	1.85∶1	1∶1	983,520
XGA-2	XGA-2 resolution:	1366	×	1024	4∶3	4∶3	1∶1	1,398,784
810p 128:81	810p:	1280	×	810	128∶81	128:81	1∶1	1,036,800
820p	820p 128:82:	1280	×	820	64∶41	128:82	1∶1	1,049,600
XGA 820p 4:3	4:3 version of 820p:	1093	×	820	4∶3	4∶3	1∶1	896,260
810p	810p with 4:3 aspect ratio:	1080	×	810	4∶3	4∶3	1∶1	874,800
810p	HD 810p, FWXGA 810p:	1440	×	810	16∶9	16∶9	1∶1	1,166,400
800p 9:5		1440	×	800	9∶5	9∶5	1∶1	1,152,000
1.09M2	Apple PowerBook G4	1280	×	854	3∶2	3∶2	1.001	1,093,120
1.11M1.481	WXGA+ 864p ≈3:2	1280	×	864	40∶27	40:27	1∶1	1,105,920
1.07M1.675	Some budget tablets	1340	×	800	67∶40	1.675:1	1∶1	1,072,000
SXGA−	Super XGA "Minus":	1280	×	960	4∶3	4∶3	1∶1	1,228,800
1.23M2.083	Sony VAIO P series	1600	×	768	25∶12	25:12	1∶1	1,228,800
1.30M0.9	HTC Vive (per eye)	1080	×	1200	9∶10	9:10	1∶1	1,296,000
WSXGA	Wide SXGA	1440	×	900	8∶5	8∶5	1∶1	1,296,000
WXGA+	Wide XGA+	1440	×	900	8∶5	8∶5	1∶1	1,296,000
1.66M4	1152p 5:4 aspect ratio	1440	×	1152	5∶4	5∶4	1∶1	1,658,880
SXGA	Super XGA	1280	×	1024	5∶4	5∶4	1∶1	1,310,720
HD Pro DVD 1080	1280x1080 resolution:	1280	×	1080	32∶27	32:27	1∶1	1,382,400
540p 1.18:1	540p:	640	×	540	32∶27	32:27	1∶1	345,600
2160p	2160p:	2560	×	2160	32∶27	32:27	1∶1	5,529,600
1.38M2	Apple PowerBook G4, WSXGA	1440	×	960	3∶2	3∶2	1∶1	1,382,400
1.33M9	864p	1536	×	864	16∶9	16∶9	1∶1	1,327,104
WSXGA-	Wide Super Extended Graphics Array minus:	1536	×	960	8∶5	8∶5	1∶1	1,474,560
1.47MA	XJXGA	1536	×	960	8∶5	8∶5	1∶1	1,474,560
WSXGA 3:2		1536	×	1024	3∶2	3∶2	1∶1	1,572,864
UXGA-	"UXGA minus"	1536	×	1152	4∶3	4∶3	1∶1	1,769,472
HD+	900p Nintendo Wii U, Xbox One	1600	×	900	16∶9	16∶9	1∶1	1,440,000
SXGA+	Super XGA Plus, Lenovo Thinkpad X61 Tablet	1400	×	1050	4∶3	4∶3	1∶1	1,470,000
1.24M6	WXGA+ 5:3	1440	×	864	5∶3	5∶3	1∶1	1,244,160
1.47M5	Similar to A4 paper format (~123 dpi for A4 size)	1440	×	1024	45∶32	7∶5	0.996	1,474,560
1.56M3	HDV 1080i	1440	×	1080	4∶3	4∶3	1∶1	1,555,200
1,5K	1,5K 1:1:	1536	×	1536	1∶1	1∶1	1∶1	2,359,296
1.46M9	900p 9:5	1620	×	900	9∶5	9∶5	1∶1	1,458,000
1.38M14	Cinema XGA+	1600	×	864	50∶27	1.85∶1	1∶1	1,382,400
1.11M8	WXGA 15:8	1440	×	768	15∶8	15:8	1∶1	1,105,920
1.04M2∶1	Supported by some smartphones	1440	×	720	2∶1	2∶1	1∶1	1,036,800
1.07M12	Supported by some smartphones	1480	×	720	18½∶9	18½∶9	1∶1	1,065,600
1.09M19∶9	Supported by some smartphones	1520	×	720	19∶9	19∶9	1∶1	1,094,400
1.12M6	Supported by some smartphones	1560	×	720	19½∶9	19½∶9	1∶1	1,123,200
1.15M09	Supported by some smartphones	1600	×	720	20∶9	20∶9	1∶1	1,152,000
1.18M20½∶9	Supported by some smartphones	1640	×	720	20½∶9	20½∶9	1∶1	1,180,800
1.21M1B	Supported by some smartphones	1680	×	720	21∶9	21∶9	1∶1	1,209,600
1.27M2.444	Supported by some smartphones	1760	×	720	22∶9	22:9	1∶1	1,267,200
UXGA+ 4:3	Close to UXGA 1280p:	1706	×	1280	4∶3	4∶3	1∶1	2,183,680
WSXGA	Close to Wide SXGA, HD 960p 16:9:	1706	×	960	853:480	16∶9	2560:2559	1,637,760
1.82MA	Close to WSXGA+	1706	×	1066	8∶5	8∶5	1∶1	1,818,596
1.81M1.529	1088p	1664	×	1088	26∶17	11:7	1∶1	1,810,432
1.70Mϕ∶1	WSXGA with 13:8 aspect ratio	1664	×	1024	ϕ∶1	ϕ∶1	1∶1	1,703,936
6.82Mϕ∶1	WQSXGA with 13:8 aspect ratio 13:8	3328	×	2048	ϕ∶1	ϕ∶1	1∶1	6,815,744
1.77M1.688	WSXGA with 27:16 aspect ratio 27:16	1728	×	1024	27∶16	27:16	1∶1	1,769,472
7.08M1.688	WQSXGA with 27:16 aspect ratio 27:16	3456	×	2048	27∶16	27:16	1∶1	7,077,888
1.64M0	SGI 1600SW	1600	×	1024	25∶16	25∶16	1∶1	1,638,400
WSXGA	WSXGA:	1600	×	1024	25∶16	25∶16	1∶1	1,638,400
WSXGA+	Wide SXGA+	1680	×	1050	8∶5	8∶5	1∶1	1,764,000
1.87MA	1080p with 8:5 aspect ratio	1728	×	1080	8∶5	8∶5	1∶1	1,866,240
1.78M9	Available in some monitors	1776	×	1000	222∶125	16∶9	1.001	1,776,000
1080p Clean aperture	Clean aperture resolution 1062p:	1888	×	1062	16∶9	16∶9	1∶1	2,005,056
UXGA	Ultra XGA:Lenovo Thinkpad T60	1600	×	1200	4∶3	4∶3	1∶1	1,920,000
2.76M6	WUXGA+ 5:3	2160	×	1280	27∶16	5∶3	1∶1	2,764,800
1.94M1B	UWHD+	2160	×	900	24∶10	21∶9	1∶1	1,944,000
1.54M6	Wide Quad-VGA (WQVGA), and WSXGA. Not confusion with WQVGA 400x240	1600	×	960	5∶3	5∶3	1∶1	1,536,000
2.05M4	Sun3 Hi-res monochrome	1600	×	1280	5∶4	5∶4	1∶1	2,048,000
1600p 1:1		1600	×	1600	1∶1	1∶1	1∶1	2,560,000
UWHD		1920	×	800	24∶10	21∶9	1∶1	1,536,000
FWSXGA 15:8	15:8 version of FWSXGA:	1920	×	1024	15∶8	15:8	1∶1	1,966,080
FHD, 1080p	1080 HDTV (1080i, 1080p Xbox One, Nintendo Switch)	1920	×	1080	16∶9	16∶9	1∶1	2,073,600
UW810p	UltraWide 810p:	1920	×	810	21∶9	21∶9	1;1	1,555,200
HD 1152p	HD 1152p with 25:16 aspect ratio:	1800	×	1152	25∶16	25∶16	1∶1	2,073,600
UW720p	UltraWide 720p:	1720	×	720	21½∶9	21∶9	1∶1	1,238,400
SFHD	Super Full HD 1920p:	1920	×	1920	1∶1	1∶1	1∶1	3,686,400
1:1 2048p		2048	×	2048	1∶1	1∶1	1∶1	4,194,304
2.07M1	Windows Mixed Reality headsets (per eye)	1440	×	1440	1∶1	1∶1	1∶1	2,073,600
DCI 2K	DCI 2K	2048	×	1080	1.90∶1	1.85∶1	0.976	2,211,840
WUXGA	Wide UXGA	1920	×	1200	8∶5	8∶5	1∶1	2,304,000
UWSVGA		1440	×	600	24∶10	21∶9	1∶1	864,000
UWEDTV-1440w	UltraWide-EDTV 1440w:	1440	×	576	5∶2	5:2	1∶1	829,440
UWEDTV	UWEDTV:	1440	×	540	8∶3	8:3	1∶1	777,600
UWEDTV	UWEDTV:	1440	×	512	45∶16	45:16	1∶1	737,280
UWSVGA+	UltraWide-SVGA+:	1440	×	640	9∶4	2.25:1	1∶1	921,600
UWSVGA	UltraWide-SVGA:	1366	×	600	20½∶9	2.276:1	1∶1	819,600
UWEDTV	UltraWide-EDTV:	1280	×	540	21∶9	21∶9	1∶1	691,200
3.71M3	Some iPads	2224	×	1668	4∶3	4∶3	1∶1	3,709,632
3.90M5	Some iPads	2340	×	1668	195∶139	7∶5	1∶1	3,903,120
4.03M1.452	Some iPads	2420	×	1667	2420∶1667	145:100	1∶1	4,034,140
QWXGA	Quad WXGA, 2K, FWUXGA minus 1152p	2048	×	1152	16∶9	16∶9	1∶1	2,359,296
2.03MA	Recommended system requirements for Cyberpunk 2077 for Mac	1800	×	1125	8∶5	8∶5	1∶1	2,025,000
2.41M3	Supported by some GPUs, monitors, and games	1792	×	1344	4∶3	4∶3	1∶1	2,408,448
FHD+	Full HD Plus:Microsoft Surface 3	1920	×	1280	3∶2	3∶2	1∶1	2,457,600
2.46M19∶9	Samsung Galaxy S10e, Xiaomi Mi A2 Lite, Huawei P20 Lite	2280	×	1080	19∶9	19∶9	1∶1	2,462,400
2.53M19½∶9	Samsung Galaxy A8s, Xiaomi Redmi Note 7, Honor Play	2340	×	1080	19½:9	19½:9	1∶1	2,527,200
2.58M09	Honor X8d	2392	×	1080	299∶135	20∶9	1∶1	2,583,360
2.58M3	Supported by some GPUs, monitors, and games	1856	×	1392	4∶3	4∶3	1∶1	2,583,552
256x135	DCI 0,25K:	256	×	135	1.90∶1	1.85∶1	1∶1	34,560
512x270	DCI 0,5K:	512	×	270	1.90∶1	1.85∶1	1;1	138,240
DCI 0,75K	DCI 0,75K, 768x405 pixels.:	768	×	405	1.90∶1	1.85∶1	1∶1	311,040
1K	DCI 1K:	1024	×	540	1.90∶1	1.85∶1	1∶1	552,960
1,25K	1,25K DCI:	1280	×	675	1.90∶1	1.85∶1	1∶1	864,000
1,5K	1,5K DCI:	1536	×	810	1.90∶1	1.85∶1	1∶1	1,244,160
4.16M5	Supported by some tablets	2408	×	1728	301∶216	7∶5	1∶1	4,161,024
2,5K DCI	2,5K DCI:	2560	×	1350	1.90∶1	1.85∶1	1∶1	3,456,000
3.60MA	1500p 8:5	2400	×	1500	8∶5	8∶5	1∶1	3,600,000
UWSXGA-	UltraWide Super Extended Graphics Array:	2304	×	960	24∶10	21∶9	1∶1	2,211,840
QHD 25:16	QHD with aspect ratio 25:16:	2400	×	1536	25∶16	25∶16	1∶1	3,686,400
QHD 5:3	1440p with 5:3 aspect ratio:	2400	×	1440	5∶3	5∶3	1∶1	3,456,000
1350p	HD 1350p (non-standard HD resolution) with aspect ratio 16:9, FHD+, QHD-:	2400	×	1350	16∶9	16∶9	1∶1	3,240,000
1280p	HD 1280p (non-standard HD resolution) with aspect ratio 16:9, FHD+, QHD-:	2276	×	1280	16∶9	16∶9	1∶1	2,913,280
1280p	HD 1280p (non-standard HD resolution) with aspect ratio 9:5, FHD+, QHD-:	2304	×	1280	9∶5	16∶9	1∶1	2,949,120
1400p	1400p with aspect ratio 16:10:	2240	×	1400	8∶5	8∶5	1∶1	3,136,000
1260p	HD 1260p with aspect ratio 16:9:	2240	×	1260	16∶9	16∶9	1∶1	2,822,400
1435p	1435p with aspect ratio 16:10:	2296	×	1435	8∶5	8∶5	1∶1	3,294,760
1200p	HD 1200p:	2132	×	1200	533:300	16∶9	1600:1599	2,558,400
2.59M09	Samsung Galaxy A70, Samsung Galaxy S21/+, Xiaomi Redmi Note 9S, default for many 3200x1440 phones	2400	×	1080	20∶9	20∶9	1∶1	2,592,000
UWSXGA	UltraWide SXGA:	2400	×	1024	75∶32	21∶9	1∶1	2,457,600
WUXGA+ 3:2 1366p	WUXGA+ 1366p with 3:2 aspect ratio:	2048	×	1366	3∶2	3∶2	1∶1	2,797,568
QXGA+	Quad Extended Graphics Array Plus:	2400	×	1800	4∶3	4∶3	1∶1	4,320,000
FHD-	"Full HD minus":	1800	×	1024	225∶128	7∶4	1∶1	1,843,200
UXGA+	Ultra Extended Graphics Array plus:	1800	×	1350	4∶3	4∶3	1∶1	2,430,000
2.59M4	Supported by some GPUs, monitors, and games	1800	×	1440	5∶4	5∶4	1∶1	2,592,000
2.40M6	WUXGA 5:3, supported by some tablets, Samsung Galaxy Tab S6 Lite, Redmi Pad	2000	×	1200	5∶3	5∶3	1∶1	2,400,000
5.47M6	Some tablets	2960	×	1848	370∶231	5∶3	1∶1	5,470,080
5.76M0	Some tablets	3000	×	1920	25∶16	25∶16	1∶1	5,760,000
5.40M6	WQXGA+ 1800p 5:3	3000	×	1800	5∶3	5∶3	1∶1	5,400,000
6.84M2	Some tablets	3200	×	2136	400∶267	3∶2	1∶1	6,835,200
3.73M4	1728p with 5:4 aspect ratio	2160	×	1728	5∶4	5∶4	1∶1	3,732,480
4.62MA	1700p 8:5	2720	×	1700	8∶5	8∶5	1∶1	4,624,000
CWSXGA	NEC CRV43, Ostendo CRVD, Alienware Curved Display	2880	×	900	16∶5	16:5	1∶1	2,592,000
WXGA+		1536	×	900	128∶75	128:75	1∶1	1,382,400
DXGA	Dual-Width Extended Graphics Array:	2048	×	768	8∶3	8:3	1∶1	1,572,864
UWQSXGA-	UltraWide Quad Super Extended Graphics Array Minus:	4608	×	1920	24∶10	21∶9	1∶1	8,847,360
QXGA-	Quad Extended Graphics Array Minus:	2048	×	1440	64∶45	7∶5	1∶1	2,949,120
1620p	1620p with 4:3 aspect ratio:	2160	×	1620	4∶3	4∶3	1∶1	3,499,200
Wide 1152p	1.875:1 version of 1152p:	2160	×	1152	15∶8	15:8	1∶1	2,488,320
2.33M2∶1	Xiaomi Redmi A2, some other smartphones	2160	×	1080	2∶1	2∶1	1∶1	2,332,800
2.59M9	HTC Vive, Oculus Rift (both eyes), FWUXGA	2160	×	1200	9∶5	9∶5	1∶1	2,592,000
2.92MA	Lenovo ThinkPad X1 Nano Gen 1	2160	×	1350	8∶5	8∶5	1∶1	2,916,000
1080p 16.5:9	16.5:9 version of 1080p:	1980	×	1080	11∶6	16.5:9	1∶1	2,138,400
1080p 17:9	17:9 version of 1080p:	2040	×	1080	1.85∶1	1.85∶1	1∶1	2,203,200
1080p 17.5:9	17.5:9 version of 1080p:	2100	×	1080	35∶18	17.5:9	1∶1	2,268,000
3.29MA	System requirements for high-definition Cyberpunk 2077 for Mac with Apple Silicon CPU's	2294	×	1432	1147∶716	8∶5	1∶1	3,285,008
2.40M12	Galaxy S8 with 1080p, and some other smartphones	2220	×	1080	18½∶9	18½∶9	1∶1	2,397,600
2.62MA	Supported by some GPUs, monitors, and games	2048	×	1280	8∶5	8∶5	1∶1	2,621,440
TXGA	Tesselar XGA	1920	×	1400	48∶35	7∶5	1.021	2,688,000
2.66M20½∶9	Supported by some smartphones	2460	×	1080	20½∶9	20½∶9	1∶1	2,656,800
2.72M1B	Motorola One Vision, Motorola One Action and Sony Xperia 10 IV	2520	×	1080	21∶9	21∶9	1∶1	2,721,600
2.74M2.165	Apple iPhone X, iPhone XS and iPhone 11 Pro	2436	×	1125	812∶375	2.165	1∶1	2,740,500
2.74M1AD	Avielo Optix SuperWide 235 projector	2538	×	1080	24∶10	24∶10	1.017	2,741,040
2.76M3	Supported by some GPUs, monitors, and games	1920	×	1440	4∶3	4∶3	1∶1	2,764,800
1.48M2.164	iPhone XR, iPhone 11	1792	×	828	448∶207	448:207	1∶1	1,483,776
1.94M6	Supported by some monitors and phones	1800	×	1080	5∶3	5∶3	1∶1	1,944,000
3.34M09	Supported by some iPhones	2688	×	1242	448∶207	20∶9	1∶1	3,338,496
2.96M09	Supported by some iPhones	2532	×	1170	422∶195	20∶9	1∶1	2,962,440
3.01M09	Supported by some iPhones	2556	×	1179	284∶131	20∶9	1∶1	3,013,524
3.57M09	Supported by some iPhones	2778	×	1284	463∶214	20∶9	1∶1	3,566,952
3.60M09	Supported by some iPhones	2790	×	1290	93∶43	20∶9	1∶1	3,599,100
3.16M09	Supported by some iPhones	2622	×	1206	437∶201	20∶9	1∶1	3,162,132
3.79M09	Supported by some iPhones	2868	×	1320	239∶110	20∶9	1∶1	3,785,760
2.42M12	Supported by some phones	2244	×	1080	187∶90	18½∶9	1∶1	2,423,520
2.43M12	Supported by some phones	2246	×	1080	1123∶540	18½∶9	1∶1	2,425,680
2.45M2.102	Supported by some phones	2270	×	1080	227∶108	19∶9	1∶1	2,451,600
2.57M6	Supported by some phones	2376	×	1080	2.21∶1	19½∶9	1∶1	2,566,080
FWUXGA-	"Full Wide Ultra Extended Graphics Array minus"	2048	×	1200	128∶75	128:75	1∶1	2,457,600
UW-FHD	UltraWide FHD:Cinema TV from Philips and Vizio, Dell UltraSharp U2913WM, ASUS MX299Q, NEC EA294WMi, Philips 298X4QJAB, LG 29EA93, AOC Q2963PM	2560	×	1080	21∶9	21∶9	1∶1	2,764,800
3.11M2	Microsoft Surface Pro 3	2160	×	1440	3∶2	3∶2	1∶1	3,110,400
QXGA	Quad XGA:iPad (3rd Generation), iPad Mini (2nd Generation)	2048	×	1536	4∶3	4∶3	1∶1	3,145,728
3.32MA	Maximum resolution of the Sony GDM-FW900, Hewlett Packard A7217A and the Retina Display MacBook	2304	×	1440	8∶5	8∶5	1∶1	3,317,760
3.39M2	Surface Laptop, Framework Laptop 13	2256	×	1504	3∶2	3∶2	1∶1	3,393,024
DSXGA	Dual Super Extended Graphics Array:	2560	×	1024	5∶2	5:2	1∶1	2,621,440
WQHD, 2.5K	Dell UltraSharp U2711, Dell XPS One 27, Apple iMac	2560	×	1440	16∶9	16∶9	1∶1	3,686,400
3.93M6	WQXGA 5:3, available in some devices	2560	×	1536	5∶3	5∶3	1∶1	3,932,160
3.74M9	Available in some monitors	2576	×	1450	1288:725	16∶9	1450:1449	3,735,200
—		1920	×	960	2∶1	2∶1	1∶1	1,843,200
—		1728	×	864	2∶1	2∶1	1∶1	1,492,992
WSXGA 2:1		2048	×	1024	2∶1	2∶1	1∶1	2,097,152
3.87M5	Some iPads	2360	×	1640	59∶41	7∶5	1∶1	3,870,400
WUXGA-	"WUXGA minus" with 5:3 aspect ratio	1920	×	1152	5∶3	5∶3	1∶1	2,211,840
1536p	1536p with 3:2 aspect ratio:	2304	×	1536	3∶2	3∶2	1∶1	3,538,944
QXGA+	Supported by some displays and graphics cards, Quad Extended Graphics Array Plus	2304	×	1728	4∶3	4∶3	1∶1	3,981,312
WQXGA	Wide QXGA:Apple Cinema HD 30, Apple 13" MacBook Pro Retina Display, Dell Ultrasharp U3011, Dell 3007WFP, Dell 3008WFP, Gateway XHD3000, Samsung 305T, HP LP3065, HP ZR30W, Nexus 10	2560	×	1600	8∶5	8∶5	1∶1	4,096,000
4.15M2∶1	LG G6, LG V30, Pixel 2 XL, HTC U11+, Windows Mixed Reality headsets (both eyes)	2880	×	1440	2∶1	2∶1	1∶1	4,147,200
4.98M6	WQXGA+ 5:3	2880	×	1728	5∶3	5∶3	1∶1	4,976,640
Infinity Display	Samsung Galaxy S8, S8+, S9, S9+, Note 8	2960	×	1440	18½∶9	18½∶9	1∶1	4,262,400
4.35M2	Chromebook Pixel	2560	×	1700	3∶2	3∶2	1∶1	4,352,000
WQXGA+ 3:2	Wide Quad Extended Graphics Array Plus with aspect ratios 3:2 and width 2560 pixels:	2560	×	1728	40∶27	40:27	1∶1	4,423,680
4.42M2.133	1440p 96:45	3072	×	1440	32∶15	96:45	1∶1	4,423,680
WQSXGA 13:8	13:8 version of WQSXGA:	3120	×	1920	ϕ∶1	ϕ∶1	1∶1	5,990,400
WQSXGA 3:2 2080p		3120	×	2080	3∶2	3∶2	1∶1	6,489,600
FWQXGA 1920p	WQSXGA 1920p version with 7:4 aspect ratio:	3360	×	1920	7∶4	7∶4	1∶1	6,451,200
4.32M2.083	Some tablets/phones	3000	×	1440	25∶12	19∶9	1∶1	4,320,000
3.48M5	Some tablets	2176	×	1600	34∶25	7∶5	1∶1	3,481,600
3.17M1.528	Some tablets	2200	×	1440	55∶36	550:360	1	3,168,000
5.15M2	Some tablets	2800	×	1840	35∶23	3∶2	1∶1	5,152,000
4.61M1.422	Pixel C	2560	×	1800	64:45	64:45	1∶1	4,608,000
WQHD+, 1620p	Lenovo Thinkpad W541	2880	×	1620	16∶9	16∶9	1∶1	4,665,600
4.92M3	Max. CRT resolution, supported by the Viewsonic P225f and some graphics cards	2560	×	1920	4∶3	4∶3	1∶1	4,915,200
4.42M1.529	1700p 26:17 aspect ratio	2600	×	1700	26∶17	1.529	1∶1	4,420,000
4.82M2	Supported by some GPU's	2688	×	1792	3∶2	3∶2	1∶1	4,816,896
UW3K	UltraWide 3K:	3072	×	1280	24∶10	21∶9	1∶1	3,932,160
4.98M14	3K	3072	×	1620	1.90∶1	1.85∶1	0.976	4,976,640
5.31M16∶9	3k 16:9	3072	×	1728	16∶9	16∶9	1∶1	5,308,416
WQSXGA 2012p 3:2	3:2 version 2012p WQSXGA:	3018	×	2012	3∶2	3∶2	1∶1	6,072,216
6.19M2	Supported by some tablets	3048	×	2032	3∶2	3∶2	1∶1	6,193,536
DUXGA	Dual Ultra Extended Graphics Array:	3200	×	1200	8∶3	8:3	1∶1	3,840,000
UW5K+	UltraWide 5K+:	5760	×	2400	24∶10	21∶9	1∶1	13,824,000
UW6K	UltraWide 6k:	6144	×	2560	24∶10	21∶9	1∶1	15,728,640
Ultra-Wide QHD	LG, Samsung, Acer, HP and Dell UltraWide monitors	3440	×	1440	21∶9	21∶9	1∶1	4,953,600
DFHD	Dual Full HD	3840	×	1080	32∶9	32:9	1∶1	4,147,200
DWUXGA	Dual Wide UXGA 1280p:	3840	×	1280	3∶1	3:1	1∶1	4,915,200
DFHD+, DWUXGA	Dual WUXGA, Dual-FHD+:	3840	×	1200	16∶5	16:5	1∶1	4,608,000
4.99M2	Microsoft Surface Pro 4	2736	×	1824	3∶2	3∶2	1∶1	4,990,464
3.11M06	8:3 FHD	2880	×	1080	8∶3	8:3	1∶1	3,110,400
5.18MA	Apple 15" MacBook Pro Retina Display	2880	×	1800	8∶5	8∶5	1∶1	5,184,000
WQXGA+	Wide QXGA+	2880	×	1800	8∶5	8∶5	1∶1	5,184,000
5.53M2	Microsoft Surface Pro X, Framework Laptop 13 (2.8K Display only)	2880	×	1920	3∶2	3∶2	1∶1	5,529,600
WQSXGA	WQSXGA alternative version 3:2 aspect ratio:	2880	×	1920	3∶2	3∶2	1∶1	5,529,600
UWFHD+	UltraWide FullHD+:	2880	×	1200	24∶10	21∶9	1∶1	3,456,000
QSXGA	Quad SXGA:	2560	×	2048	5∶4	5∶4	1∶1	5,242,880
5.60M3	iPad Pro 12.9"	2732	×	2048	4∶3	4∶3	0.999	5,595,136
QSXGA ≈7:5	7:5 version of QSXGA, and resolution of some tablets:	2880	×	2048	45∶32	7∶5	0.996	5,898,240
QHD+	HP Envy TouchSmart 14, Fujitsu Lifebook UH90/L, Lenovo Yoga 2 Pro	3200	×	1800	16∶9	16∶9	1∶1	5,760,000
QSXGA+	Quad SXGA+:	2800	×	2100	4∶3	4∶3	1∶1	5,880,000
5.90MA	Apple 16" MacBook Pro Retina Display	3072	×	1920	8∶5	8∶5	1∶1	5,898,240
WQSXGA-	Wide Quad Super Extended Graphics Array minus:	3072	×	1920	8∶5	8∶5	1∶1	5,898,240
3K	3K 5:3, WQSXGA 1920p 5:3:	3200	×	1920	5∶3	5∶3	1∶1	6,144,000
4.26M1.538	Apple 13" MacBook Air (Apple silicon) Retina Display	2560	×	1664	8∶5.2	8∶5.2	1∶1	4,259,840
5.37M17∶11	Apple 15" MacBook Air (Apple silicon) Retina Display	2880	×	1864	8∶5.178	8∶5.178	1∶1	5,368,320
5.94M17∶11	Apple 14" MacBook Pro (Apple silicon) Retina Display	3024	×	1964	8∶5.196	8∶5.196	1∶1	5,939,136
7.72M1.547	Apple 16" MacBook Pro (Apple silicon) Retina Display	3456	×	2234	8∶5.171	8∶5.171	1∶1	7,720,704
3K	Microsoft Surface Book, Huawei MateBook X Pro	3000	×	2000	3∶2	3∶2	1∶1	6,000,000
3K	OnePlus Pad 2, OnePlus Pad Pro	3000	×	2120	75∶53	7∶5	0.989	6,360,000
4.31M12	Supported by some phones	2992	×	1440	187∶90	18½∶9	1∶1	4,308,480
4.45M2.144	Supported by some phones	3088	×	1440	193∶90	19∶9	1∶1	4,446,720
4.56M6	Supported by some phones	3168	×	1440	2.21∶1	19½∶9	1∶1	4,561,920
4.63M09	Supported by some phones	3216	×	1440	67∶30	20∶9	1∶1	4,631,040
3K	3K resolution with aspect ratio 128:75	3072	×	1800	128∶75	128:75	1∶1	5,529,600
4.38M19∶9	Supported by some smartphones	3040	×	1440	19∶9	19∶9	1∶1	4,377,600
4.49M6	Supported by some smartphones	3120	×	1440	19½∶9	19½∶9	1∶1	4,492,800
4.61M09	Supported by some smartphones	3200	×	1440	20∶9	20∶9	1∶1	4,608,000
UWQHD	UWQHD 9:4 version:	3240	×	1440	9∶4	9:4	1∶1	4,665,600
UW4K	Ultra-Wide 4K: Sony Xperia 1, Sony Xperia 1 II, Sony Xperia 1 III, Sony Xperia 1 IV, Sony Xperia 1 V:	3840	×	1600	24∶10	21∶9	0.988	6,144,000
6.22M1B	Ultra-Wide 1620p	3840	×	1620	21∶9	21∶9	1∶1	6,220,800
VR 3K	VR 3K:	3072	×	1536	2∶1	2∶1	1∶1	4,718,592
3K	3K fulldome:	3072	×	3072	1∶1	1∶1	1∶1	9,437,184
QUXGA-	"Quad-UXGA minus":	3072	×	2304	4∶3	4∶3	1∶1	7,077,888
WQSXGA 3:2	Wide QSXGA with 3:2 aspect ratio, and 3K2K:	3072	×	2048	3∶2	3∶2	1∶1	6,291,456
WQSXGA	Wide QSXGA:	3200	×	2048	25∶16	25∶16	1∶1	6,553,600
2160p	4:3 2160p, 3K UHD:	2880	×	2160	4∶3	4∶3	1∶1	6,220,800
5.83M9	1800p 9:5	3240	×	1800	9∶5	9∶5	1∶1	5,832,000
7.00M2	Microsoft Surface Book 2 15"	3240	×	2160	3∶2	3∶2	1∶1	6,998,400
UWXGA+	Ultra Wide Extended Graphics Array Plus:	2048	×	864	21∶9	21∶9	1∶1	1,769,472
7.46MA	Supported by some GPU's, and monitors	3456	×	2160	8∶5	8∶5	1∶1	7,464,960
WQSXGA+	Wide Quad Super Extended Graphics Array Plus:	3360	×	2100	8∶5	8∶5	1∶1	7,056,000
2160p 14:9	14:9 version of 2160p:	3360	×	2160	14∶9	14∶9	1∶1	7,257,600
7.78M6	2160p 5:3	3600	×	2160	5∶3	5∶3	1∶1	7,776,000
WQUXGA minus 3:2		3360	×	2240	3∶2	3∶2	1∶1	7,526,400
UWQHD 21:9	true 21:9 version of QHD:	3360	×	1440	21∶9	21∶9	1∶1	4,838,400
QUXGA	Quad UXGA:	3200	×	2400	4∶3	4∶3	1∶1	7,680,000
WQSXGA 7:4	Wide QSXGA 7:4:	3584	×	2048	7∶4	7∶4	1∶1	7,340,032
WQUXGA 3:2		3600	×	2400	3∶2	3∶2	1∶1	8,640,000
FWQSXGA	Full Wide QSXGA:	3640	×	2048	16∶9	16∶9	1∶1	7,454,720
FWQSXGA 15:8	Full Wide QSXGA 15:8:	3840	×	2048	15∶8	15:8	1∶1	7,864,320
UWQHD 8:3	Ultra Wide Quad High Definition 8:3 aspect ratio Edition:	3840	×	1440	8∶3	8:3	1∶1	5,529,600
4K UHD-1	4K Ultra HD 1:2160p, 4000-lines UHDTV (4K UHD)	3840	×	2160	16∶9	16∶9	1∶1	8,294,400
WQUXGA+ 3:2	WQUXGA+ 3:2:	4096	×	2700	1024∶675	3∶2	1∶1	11,059,200
UW4K	UltraWide 4K 1728p:	4096	×	1728	21∶9	21∶9	1∶1	7,077,888
8.14M5	Supported by some tablets	3392	×	2400	106∶75	7∶5	1∶1	8,140,800
DCI 4K	DCI 4K:	4096	×	2160	1.85∶1	1.85∶1	0.976	8,847,360
UHD 25:16	UHD 2304p with 25:16 aspect ratio:	3600	×	2304	25∶16	25∶16	1∶1	8,294,400
2400p 3:2	2400p with 3:2 aspect ratio:	3600	×	2400	3∶2	3∶2	1∶1	8,640,000
WQUXGA-	Wide QUXGA minus, 4K-level with 5:3 aspect ratio:	3840	×	2304	5∶3	5∶3	1∶1	8,847,360
WQUXGA	Wide QUXGA:IBM T221	3840	×	2400	8∶5	8∶5	1∶1	9,216,000
UHD+ 2560p	2560p with 3:2 aspect ratio:	3840	×	2560	3∶2	3∶2	1∶1	9,830,400
UHD 4K (4:3)	4:3 version of 4K UHD with width 3840 pixels:	3840	×	2880	4∶3	4∶3	1∶1	11,059,200
VR 4K	VR 4K:	4096	×	2048	2∶1	2∶1	1∶1	8,388,608
True 4K 16:9	LG Ultrafine 21.5, Apple 21.5" 4K	4096	×	2304	16∶9	16∶9	1∶1	9,437,184
FWQUXGA	Full Wide Quad Ultra Extended Graphics Array with 128:75 aspect ratio	4096	×	2400	128∶75	128:75	1∶1	9,830,400
WQUXGA+	Wide Quad Ultra Extended Graphics Array Plus	4096	×	2560	8∶5	8∶5	1∶1	10,485,760
WQUXGA++	Wide QUXGA++:	4096	×	2732	3∶2	3∶2	1∶1	11,190,272
HXGA-	Hex Extended Graphics Array Minus:	4096	×	2880	64∶45	7∶5	1∶1	11,796,480
4K	4K fulldome 1:1:	4096	×	4096	1∶1	1∶1	1∶1	16,777,216
QDXGA	Quad Dual Extended Graphics Array:	4096	×	1536	8∶3	8:3	1∶1	6,291,456
11.29M9	Apple 24" iMac 4.5K Retina Display	4480	×	2520	16∶9	16∶9	1∶1	11,289,600
7.86M2.133	4K 19:9	4096	×	1920	32∶15	19∶9	1∶1	7,864,320
HXGA	Hex XGA:	4096	×	3072	4∶3	4∶3	1∶1	12,582,912
12.58M3	4K 4:3	4096	×	3072	4∶3	4∶3	1∶1	12,582,912
UW4K		4096	×	1800	512∶225	2.275:1	1∶1	7,372,800
HXGA 5:4	HXGA with 5:4 aspect ratio:	4096	×	3276	5∶4	5∶4	1∶1	13,418,496
13.50M2	Surface Studio	4500	×	3000	3∶2	3∶2	1∶1	13,500,000
4K+ UHD 3:2	2880p 3:2 aspect ratio:	4320	×	2880	3∶2	3∶2	1∶1	12,441,600
10.37M9	FWQUXGA, Full Wide QUXGA 9:5	4320	×	2400	9∶5	9∶5	1∶1	10,368,000
5K UHD 5:3	5K UHD 5:3:	4800	×	2880	5∶3	5∶3	1∶1	13,824,000
4.8K UHD	UHD 4.8K 2700p:	4800	×	2700	16∶9	16∶9	1∶1	12,960,000
4K+ UHD	UHD 2880p with 16:10 aspect ratio:	4608	×	2880	8∶5	8∶5	1∶1	13,271,040
HXGA+	Hex Graphics Array Plus:	4608	×	3456	4∶3	4∶3	1∶1	15,925,248
UW4K+	Ultra-Wide 4K+:	4320	×	1800	24∶10	21∶9	1∶1	7,776,000
UWQSXGA	UltraWide QSXGA:	4800	×	2048	75∶32	21∶9	1∶1	9,830,400
5K	5K fulldome:	5120	×	5120	1∶1	1∶1	1∶1	26,214,400
HSXGA	Hex SXGA:	5120	×	4096	5∶4	5∶4	1∶1	20,971,520
25x XGA	XGA but 25 times bigger than XGA to pixel count:	5120	×	3840	4∶3	4∶3	1∶1	19,660,800
WHXGA+	Wide Hex XGA+:	5120	×	3456	40∶27	3∶2	1∶1	17,694,720
WHXGA	Wide HXGA:	5120	×	3200	8∶5	8∶5	1∶1	16,384,000
5K	Dell UP2715K, LG Ultrafine 27, Apple 27" iMac 5K Retina Display, Apple Studio Display	5120	×	2880	16∶9	16∶9	1∶1	14,745,600
5K DCI	5K DCI:	5120	×	2700	1.90∶1	1.85∶1	1∶1	13,824,000
5K	5K:	5120	×	2664	640∶333	1.921	1∶1	13,639,680
5K 2:1	5K 2:1:	5120	×	2560	2∶1	2∶1	1∶1	13,107,200
UW5K	UltraWide 5K:	5120	×	2400	32∶15	2.133:1	1∶1	12,288,000
UW5K	UltraWide 5K:	5120	×	2304	20∶9	20∶9	1∶1	11,796,480
UW5K (WUHD)	Ultra-Wide 5K:21:9 aspect ratio TVs	5120	×	2160	21∶9	21∶9	1∶1	11,059,200
QDSXGA	Quad Dual Super Extended Graphics Array	5120	×	2048	5∶2	5:2	1∶1	10,485,760
—		5120	×	1920	8∶3	8:3	1∶1	9,830,400
DWQXGA 6:2	Dual Wide Quad XGA aspect ratio 6:2:	5120	×	1728	80∶27	6:2	1∶1	8,847,360
DWQXGA	Dual Wide Quad Extended Graphics Array:	5120	×	1600	16∶5	16:5	1∶1	8,192,000
DQHD	Dual Quad HD: Philips 499P9H, Dell U4919DW, Samsung C49RG94SSU	5120	×	1440	32:9	32:9	1∶1	7,372,800
6K UHD	6K UHD resolution	5760	×	3240	16∶9	16∶9	1∶1	18,662,400
QDWSXGA+	Quad Dual Wide Super Extended Graphics Array Plus:	5760	×	2160	8∶3	8:3	1∶1	12,441,600
WHXGA+	Wide Hex Extended Graphics Array Plus:	5760	×	3600	8∶5	8∶5	1∶1	20,736,000
6K	Apple 32" Pro Display XDR 6K Retina Display	6016	×	3384	16∶9	16∶9	1∶1	20,358,144
WHXGA	Wide Hex Extended Graphics Array 5:3:	5120	×	3072	5∶3	5∶3	1∶1	15,728,640
HSXGA+	Hex Super Graphics Array Plus:	5400	×	4200	9∶7	4∶3	1∶1	22,680,000
VR 3K	VR 3K:	6144	×	3072	2∶1	2∶1	1∶1	18,874,368
6K	6K resolution with DCI aspect ratio	6144	×	3240	1.90∶1	1.85∶1	0.976	19,906,560
6K	6K UHD resolution 3456p	6144	×	3456	16∶9	16∶9	1∶1	21,233,664
QWQSXGA	Quad-Wide Quad Super Extended Graphics Array:	6144	×	4096	3∶2	3∶2	1∶1	25,165,824
6K 1:1	6K 1:1 fulldome:	6144	×	6144	1∶1	1∶1	1∶1	37,748,736
6K UHD	6K UHD+, four times bigger pixels than QHD+:	6400	×	3600	16∶9	16∶9	1∶1	23,040,000
QDUXGA	Quad Dual Ultra Extended Graphics Array:	6400	×	2400	8∶3	8:3	1∶1	15,360,000
6K	6K 5:3:	6400	×	3840	5∶3	5∶3	1∶1	24,576,000
WQDSXGA	Wide Quad Dual Super Extended Graphics Array:	6400	×	2048	25∶8	25:8	1∶1	13,107,200
WHSXGA	Wide HSXGA:	6400	×	4096	25∶16	25∶16	1∶1	26,214,400
WHSXGA+	Wide Hex Super Extended Graphics Array Plus:	6720	×	4200	8∶5	8∶5	1∶1	28,224,000
25.40M9	7K UHD	6720	×	3780	16∶9	16∶9	1∶1	25,401,600
HUXGA	Hex UXGA:	6400	×	4800	4∶3	4∶3	1∶1	30,720,000
9.33M009	Dual 3K	5760	×	1620	32∶9	32:9	1∶1	9,331,200
11.52M009	DQHD+	6400	×	1800	32∶9	32:9	1∶1	11,520,000
28.31M1B	UW8K	8192	×	3456	21∶9	21∶9	1∶1	28,311,552
–		6480	×	3240	2∶1	2∶1	1∶1	20,995,200
UW2880p	Ultra-Wide 2880p	6880	×	2880	21½∶9	21∶9	0.992	19,814,400
7K UHD	7K UHD:	7168	×	4096	7∶4	7∶4	1∶1	29,360,128
7K DCI	7K DCI:	7168	×	3840	28∶15	1.85∶1	1∶1	27,525,120
UW7K	UltraWide 7K	7168	×	3072	21∶9	21∶9	1∶1	22,020,096
DUHD	Dual UHD (Dual 4K)	7680	×	2160	32∶9	32:9	1∶1	16,588,800
DUHD+	Dual UHD+:	7680	×	2400	16∶5	16:5	1∶1	18,432,000
DUHD+	Dual UHD+ 3:1:	7680	×	2560	3∶1	3:1	1∶1	19,660,800
8K 2880p, DHXGA-	Dual Hex Extended Graphics Arra6 Minus:	7680	×	2880	8∶3	8:3	1∶1	22,118,400
UW8K	Ultra-Wide 8K	7680	×	3200	24∶10	21∶9	0.988	24,576,000
UW8K	Ultra-Wide 8K with 64:27 aspect ratio	7680	×	3240	21∶9	21∶9	1∶1	24,883,200
8K 3:2•	3:2 version of 8k resolution:	7680	×	5120	3∶2	3∶2	1∶1	39,321,600
8K UHD-2	8K Ultra HD 2:4320p, 8000-lines UHDTV (8K UHD), Dell UltraSharp UP3218K 32" 8K	7680	×	4320	16∶9	16∶9	1∶1	33,177,600
3840p 2:1	UHD 3840p with 2:1 aspect ratio:	7680	×	3840	16∶9	2∶1	1∶1	29,491,200
WHUXGA-	Wide HUXGA minus:	7680	×	4608	5∶3	5∶3	1∶1	35,389,440
WHUXGA	Wide HUXGA:	7680	×	4800	8∶5	8∶5	1∶1	36,864,000
QDWQSXGA	Quad Dual-Wide QSXGA:	12800	×	4096	25∶8	25:8	1∶1	52,428,800
DWHUXGA	Dual-WHUXGA:	15360	×	4800	16∶5	16:5	1∶1	73,728,000
5760p 4:3	5760p with aspect ratio 4:3:	7680	×	5760	4∶3	4∶3	1∶1	44,236,800
DHXGA	Dual Hex Extended Graphics Array:	8192	×	3072	8∶3	8:3	1∶1	25,165,824
UW8K	UltraWide 8K	8084	×	3384	21½∶9	21∶9	1∶1	27,356,256
VR 8K	VR 8K:	8192	×	4096	2∶1	2∶1	1∶1	33,554,432
8K Full Format	DCI 8K:	8192	×	4320	1.90∶1	1.90∶1	1.002	35,389,440
True 8K UHD	8K UHD 4608p:	8192	×	4608	16∶9	16∶9	1∶1	37,748,736
8k 16:10		8192	×	5120	8∶5	8∶5	1∶1	41,943,040
QHXGA	8K 4:3, Quad Hex Extended Graphics Array:	8192	×	6144	4∶3	4∶3	1∶1	50,331,648
WHUXGA 17:10	Wide Hex Ultra Graphics Array:	8192	×	4800	128∶75	128:75	1∶1	39,321,600
5:3 version of 8k	8K 5:3 aspect rario version:	8000	×	4800	5∶3	5∶3	1∶1	38,400,000
8,5K UHD	8,5K:	8540	×	4800	427∶240	16∶9	1∶1	40,992,000
8,6K UHD	8,6K:	8640	×	4800	9∶5	9∶5	1∶1	41,472,000
41.99M9	9K UHD	8640	×	4860	16∶9	16∶9	1∶1	41,990,400
—		8640	×	4320	2∶1	2∶1	1∶1	37,324,800
6480p 4:3	6480p with aspect ratio 4:3:	8640	×	6480	4∶3	4∶3	1∶1	55,987,200
UW8K+	UltraWide 8K+:	8640	×	3600	24∶10	21∶9	1∶1	31,104,000
9K+ UHD	9K+ UHD:	9216	×	5120	9∶5	9∶5	1∶1	47,185,920
51.84M9	Larger than 960 × 540 exactly 10 times.	9600	×	5400	16∶9	16∶9	1∶1	51,840,000
Dual 5K	Dual 5k UHD:	10240	×	2880	32∶9	32:9	1∶1	29,491,200
Dual WHXGA	Dual WHXGA resolution:	10240	×	3200	16∶5	16:5	1∶1	32,768,000
10K 8:3, DHSXGA	8:3 version of 10k:	10240	×	3840	8∶3	8:3	1∶1	39,321,600
10K	10K 2:1:	10240	×	5120	2∶1	2∶1	1∶1	52,428,800
10K Full Format	DCI 10K:	10240	×	5400	1.90∶1	1.85∶1	1∶1	55,296,000
10K	10K UHD:	10240	×	5760	16∶9	16∶9	1∶1	58,982,400
10K	10K fulldome:	10240	×	10240	1∶1	1∶1	1∶1	104,857,600
62.73M9	11K UHD	10560	×	5940	16∶9	16∶9	1∶1	62,726,400
UW9K	UltraWide 9K:	9600	×	4096	75∶32	21∶9	1∶1	39,321,600
7200p 4:3	7200p with aspect ratio 4:3:	9600	×	7200	4∶3	4∶3	1∶1	69,120,000
DHSXGA	Dual Hex Super Extended Graphics Array:	10240	×	4096	5∶2	5:2	1∶1	41,943,040
UW10K	Ultra-Wide 10K:	10240	×	4320	21∶9	21∶9	1∶1	44,236,800
69.90M2	WQHXGA+ 3:2	10240	×	6826	3∶2	3∶2	1∶1	69,898,240
62.91M6	WQHXGA 5:3	10240	×	6144	5∶3	5∶3	1∶1	62,914,560
8K fulldome	8K fulldome	8192	×	8192	1∶1	1∶1	1∶1	67,108,864
WQHXGA	Wide Quad Hex Graphics Array:	10240	×	6400	8∶5	8∶5	1∶1	65,536,000
100x XGA	XGA, but is an 100 times bigger than XGA:	10240	×	7680	4∶3	4∶3	1∶1	78,643,200
QHSXGA	Quad Hex Super Extended Graphics Array:	10240	×	8192	5∶4	5∶4	1∶1	83,886,080
10K fulldome	10K:	10240	×	10240	1∶1	1∶1	1∶1	104,857,600
10K	10K 128:75:	10240	×	6000	128∶75	128:75	1∶1	61,440,000
UW11K	UltraWide 11K:	11200	×	4800	21∶9	21∶9	1∶1	53,760,000
12K	12K UHD:	11520	×	6480	16∶9	16∶9	1∶1	74,649,600
12K	12K 6656p:	12032	×	6656	47∶26	16∶9	1∶1	80,084,992
12K	12K 6912p:	12288	×	6912	16∶9	16∶9	1∶1	84,934,656
VR 12K	VR 12K:	12000	×	6000	2∶1	2∶1	1∶1	72,000,000
WQHSXGA	Wide-Quad-Hex-Super-Extended-Graphics-Array:	12800	×	8192	25∶16	25∶16	1∶1	104,857,600
12K 4:3	12K with 4:3 aspect ratio:	12288	×	9216	4∶3	4∶3	1∶1	113,246,208
12K fulldome	12K fulldome:	12288	×	12288	1∶1	1∶1	1∶1	150,994,944
12K	12K 2:1:	12288	×	6144	2∶1	2∶1	1∶1	75,497,472
12K	12K DCI:	12288	×	6480	1.90∶1	1.85∶1	1∶1	79,626,240
UW12K	UltraWide 12K:	12288	×	5120	24∶10	21∶9	1∶1	62,914,560
QHUXGA	9600p with 4:3 aspect ratio:	12800	×	9600	4∶3	4∶3	1∶1	122,880,000
UW13K	UltraWide 13K:	13120	×	5760	20½∶9	20½∶9	1∶1	75,571,200
UW14K	UltraWide 14K:	14336	×	6144	21∶9	21∶9	1∶1	88,080,384
14K UHD	14K UHD with 16:9 aspect ratio:	14336	×	8192	7∶4	16∶9	1∶1	117,440,512
13K UHD	13K UHD:	12800	×	7200	16∶9	16∶9	1∶1	92,160,000
true 13K	True 13K:	13312	×	7200	416∶225	16.5:9	1∶1	95,846,400
13K DCI	13K DCI:	13653	×	7200	1.90∶1	1.85∶1	1∶1	98,301,600
7200p 2:1	Ten times bigger than 720p:	14400	×	7200	2∶1	2∶1	1∶1	103,680,000
86.40M1B	UW14K	14400	×	6000	24∶10	21∶9	1∶1	86,400,000
14K Full Format	14K DCI:	14336	×	7680	28∶15	1.85∶1	1∶1	110,100,480
UW15K	UltraWide 15K:	15120	×	6480	21∶9	21∶9	1∶1	97,977,600
37.32M009	Dual 6K	11520	×	3240	32∶9	32:9	1∶1	37,324,800
Dual 8K	Dual 8k resolution:	15360	×	4320	32∶9	32:9	1∶1	66,355,200
UW16K	UltraWide 16K:	15360	×	6400	24∶10	21∶9	1∶1	98,304,000
UW16K	UltraWide 16K:	15360	×	6480	21∶9	21∶9	1∶1	99,532,800
15K 2:1	2:1 version of 15K:	15360	×	7680	2∶1	2;1	1∶1	117,964,800
16K	16K	15360	×	8640	16∶9	16∶9	1∶1	132,710,400
9600p, WQHUXGA	9600p with 16:10 aspect ratio:	15360	×	9600	8∶5	8∶5	1∶1	147,456,000
VR 16K	VR 16K resolution:	16000	×	8000	2∶1	2∶1	1∶1	128,000,000
16K	16K 2:1:	16384	×	8192	2∶1	2∶1	1∶1	134,217,728
16K	true 16K with 16:9 aspect ratio:	16000	×	9000	16∶9	16∶9	1∶1	144,000,000
16K 5:3	5:3 version of 16K:	16000	×	9600	5∶3	5∶3	1∶1	153,600,000
16K 8:5	8:5 version of 16K:	16384	×	10240	8∶5	8∶5	1∶1	167,772,160
113.25M1B	UW16K	16384	×	6912	21∶9	21∶9	1∶1	113,246,208
16K Full Format	DCI 16K	16384	×	8640	1.90∶1	1.90∶1	1.002	141,557,760
16K fulldome	16K fulldome:	16384	×	16384	1∶1	1∶1	1∶1	268,435,456
165.89M9	17K UHD	17280	×	9600	9∶5	9∶5	1∶1	165,888,000
18K	18K UHD:	18432	×	10240	9∶5	9∶5	1∶1	188,743,680
16K 4:3	16K with 4:3 aspect ratio:	16384	×	12288	4∶3	4∶3	1∶1	201,326,592
19K	19K:	19200	×	10800	16∶9	16∶9	1∶1	207,360,000
19K	19K resolution 8:5 aspect ratio:	19200	×	12000	8∶5	8∶5	1∶1	230,400,000
UW20k	UltraWide 20k:	20480	×	8640	21∶9	21∶9	1∶1	176,947,200
20K UHD	20K:	20480	×	11520	16∶9	16∶9	1∶1	235,929,600
20K	20K wide:	20480	×	12000	128∶75	128:75	1∶1	245,760,000
20K	20K 16:10:	20480	×	12800	8∶5	8∶5	1∶1	262,144,000
20K 4:3	20K with aspect ratio 4:3:	20480	×	15360	4∶3	4∶3	1∶1	314,572,800
294.91M5	20K 7:5	20480	×	14400	64∶45	7∶5	1∶1	294,912,000
303.10M1.384	20K 11:8	20480	×	14800	256∶185	4∶3	1∶1	303,104,000
20k	20k fulldome:	20480	×	20480	1∶1	1∶1	1∶1	419,430,400
259.20M9	21K UHD	21600	×	12000	9∶5	9∶5	1∶1	259,200,000
276.48M6	21K 5:3	21600	×	12800	27∶16	5∶3	1∶1	276,480,000
291.60MA	21K 8:5	21600	×	13500	8∶5	8∶5	1∶1	291,600,000
311.04M2	14400p 3:2	21600	×	14400	3∶2	3∶2	1∶1	311,040,000
349.92M3	16200p 4:3	21600	×	16200	4∶3	4∶3	1∶1	349,920,000
23K/24K UHD	23K/24K:	23040	×	12960	16∶9	16∶9	1∶1	298,598,400
221.18M1B	UW23K	23040	×	9600	24∶10	21∶9	1∶1	221,184,000
24K full format	24K DCI:	24576	×	12960	1.90∶1	1.896:1	1∶1	318,504,960
251.66M1B	UW24K	24576	×	10240	24∶10	21∶9	1∶1	251,658,240
24K 4:3	24K:	24000	×	18000	4∶3	4∶3	1∶1	432,000,000
24K UHD	24K:	24576	×	13824	16∶9	16∶9	1∶1	339,738,624
24K	24K 3:2:	24576	×	16384	3∶2	3∶2	1∶1	402,653,184
452.98M3	24k 4:3	24576	×	18432	4∶3	4∶3	1∶1	452,984,832
24k	24k fulldome:	24576	×	24576	1∶1	1∶1	1∶1	603,979,776
25K	25K:	25600	×	14400	16∶9	16∶9	1∶1	368,640,000
28K UHD	28K UHD:	28800	×	16200	16∶9	16∶9	1∶1	466,560,000
28K 4:3	28K 4:3:	28800	×	21600	4∶3	4∶3	1∶1	622,080,000
28K ≈1,64:1		28672	×	17448	3584∶2181	28672:17448	1∶1	500,269,056
28k	28k fulldome:	28672	×	28672	1∶1	1∶1	1∶1	822,083,584
345.60M1B	UW28K	28800	×	12000	24∶10	21∶9	1∶1	345,600,000
28K 8:5	28K 8:5:	28800	×	18000	8∶5	8∶5	1∶1	518,400,000
32K UHD	32K resolution	30720	×	17280	16∶9	16∶9	1∶1	530,841,600
393.22M1B	UW30K	30720	×	12800	24∶10	21∶9	1∶1	393,216,000
398.13M1B	UW30K	30720	×	12960	21∶9	21∶9	1∶1	398,131,200
32K 16:9	16:9 version of 32K:	32000	×	18000	16∶9	16∶9	1∶1	576,000,000
32K 5:3	5:3 version of 32k:	32000	×	19200	5∶3	5∶3	1∶1	614,400,000
32K alternative 16:9	alternative version of 32K 16:9:	32768	×	18432	16∶9	16∶9	1∶1	603,979,776
32K 8:5	32K with 8:5 aspect ratio:	32768	×	20480	8∶5	8∶5	1∶1	671,088,640
32K full format	32K DCI:	32768	×	17280	1.90∶1	1.85∶1	1∶1	566,231,040
452.98M1B	UW32K	32768	×	13824	21∶9	21∶9	1∶1	452,984,832
32K 4:3	4:3 version of 32k:	32000	×	24000	4∶3	4∶3	1∶1	768,000,000
32K 32:25	32k 32:25:	32768	×	25600	32∶25	32∶25	1∶1	838,860,800
872.42M1.231	32K 32:26	32768	×	26624	16∶13	16:13	1∶1	872,415,232
931.66M1.153	32K 8:7	32768	×	28432	2048∶1777	8:7	1∶1	931,659,776
32K 4:3	Maximum possible resolution with 4:3 aspect ratio for Windows:	32768	×	24576	4∶3	4∶3	4∶3	805,306,368
32K fulldome	Maximum possible resolution for Graphics Device Interface:	32768	×	32768	1∶1	1∶1	1∶1	1.073741824×10^{9}

== Television and media ==
For television, the display aspect ratio (DAR) is shown, not the storage aspect ratio (SAR); analog television does not have well-defined pixels, while several digital television standards have non-square pixels.

=== Analog systems ===
Analog broadcast television systems
Standard	Resolution (Note: Horizontal resolutions are approximated using the sampling theorem, while vertical resolutions (lines) are fixed, standardized values) (dots × lines)	Display aspect ratio, H:V	Total pixels
CCIR System B/G (PAL/SECAM)	~520 × 576	4:3	~299,520
CCIR System D/K/L (PAL/SECAM)	~627 × 576	4:3	~361,152
CCIR System I (PAL)	~573 × 576	4:3	~330,048
CCIR System N (PAL-N)	~440 × 576	4:3	~253,440
PALplus	~520 × 576	16:9	~300,000
Undecoded PALplus	~520 × 432	16:9	~220,000
NTSC, PAL-M	~440 × 486	4:3	~213,840
LaserDisc	~580 × 486 (NTSC)	4:3 (Note: 16:9 anamorphic available with some hardware.)	~268,800
LaserDisc	~570 × 576 (PAL/SECAM)	4:3	~322,560
VHS, Betamax, Video8	~320 × 486 (NTSC)	4:3	~153,600
VHS, Betamax, Video8	~310 × 576 (PAL/SECAM)	4:3	~178,560
Betamax Superbeta	~380 × 486 (NTSC)	4:3	~182,400
Betamax Superbeta	~370 × 576 (PAL/SECAM)	4:3	~213,120
Betacam	~387 × 486 (NTSC)	4:3	~185,760
Betacam	~387 × 576 (PAL)	4:3	~222,912
Betacam SP	~453 × 486 (NTSC)	4:3	~220,158
Betacam SP	~453 × 576 (PAL)	4:3	~260,928
S-VHS, Hi8	~560 × 486 (NTSC)	4:3	~272,160
S-VHS, Hi8	~560 × 576 (PAL)	4:3	~322,560
Hi-Vision	~1920 × 1035	16:9	~1,987,200
HD-MAC	~1040 × 1152	5:3	~1,198,080
CCIR System A (405-line)	~503 × 377	4:3 (5:4 before 1950)	~189,631
819-line	~816 × 736	4:3	~600,576

=== Digital standards ===
Digital television broadcast and video media distribution standards
Standard	Resolution (dots × lines)	Name	Scan	Frame rate (Hz)	Display aspect ratio, H:V	Total pixels
VCD (MPEG-1), LDTV (e.g. DMB)	352 × 240	SIF 525	240p	30	4:3	84,480
VCD (MPEG-1), LDTV (e.g. DMB)	352 × 288	SIF 625	288p	25	4:3	101,376
CVD	352 × 480		480i	30	4:3, 16:9	168,960
CVD	352 × 576		576i	25	4:3, 16:9	202,725
SVCD (MPEG-2)	480 × 480		480i	30	4:3, 16:9	230,400
SVCD (MPEG-2)	480 × 576		576i	25	4:3, 16:9	276,480
DVD	720 × 480	NTSC	480i, 480p	24, 30	4:3, 16:9	345,600
DVD	720 × 576	PAL	576i, 576p	25	4:3, 16:9	414,720
SDTV, EDTV (SMPTE 293M, Rec. 601, e.g. ATSC, DVB, ISDB)	352 × 480		480i, 480p	30	4:3, 16:9	168,960
SDTV, EDTV (SMPTE 293M, Rec. 601, e.g. ATSC, DVB, ISDB)	480 × 480		480i, 480p	30	4:3, 16:9	230,400
SDTV, EDTV (SMPTE 293M, Rec. 601, e.g. ATSC, DVB, ISDB)	528 × 480		480i, 480p	30	4:3, 16:9	253,440
SDTV, EDTV (SMPTE 293M, Rec. 601, e.g. ATSC, DVB, ISDB)	544 × 480		480i, 480p	30	4:3, 16:9	261,120
SDTV, EDTV (SMPTE 293M, Rec. 601, e.g. ATSC, DVB, ISDB)	640 × 480		480i, 480p	30	4:3, 16:9	307,200
SDTV, EDTV (SMPTE 293M, Rec. 601, e.g. ATSC, DVB, ISDB)	704 × 480	4SIF 525	480i, 480p	30	4:3, 16:9	337,920
SDTV, EDTV (SMPTE 293M, Rec. 601, e.g. ATSC, DVB, ISDB)	720 × 480	NTSC	480i, 480p	30	4:3, 16:9	345,600
SDTV, EDTV (SMPTE 293M, Rec. 601, e.g. ATSC, DVB, ISDB)	480 × 576		576i, 576p	25	4:3, 16:9	276,480
SDTV, EDTV (SMPTE 293M, Rec. 601, e.g. ATSC, DVB, ISDB)	544 × 576		576i, 576p	25	4:3, 16:9	313,344
SDTV, EDTV (SMPTE 293M, Rec. 601, e.g. ATSC, DVB, ISDB)	704 × 576	4SIF 625	576i, 576p	25	4:3, 16:9	405,504
SDTV, EDTV (SMPTE 293M, Rec. 601, e.g. ATSC, DVB, ISDB)	720 × 576	PAL	576i, 576p	25	4:3, 16:9	414,720
HDTV (Rec. 709; Blu-ray, HD DVD)	1280 × 720	HD	720p	24, 25, 30, 50, 60	16:9	921,600
HDTV (Rec. 709; Blu-ray, HD DVD)	1280 × 1080	Full HD, HD Lite	1080i	25, 30	16:9	1,382,400
HDTV (Rec. 709; Blu-ray, HD DVD)	1440 × 1080	Full HD, HD Lite	1080i	25, 30	16:9	1,555,200
HDTV (Rec. 709; Blu-ray, HD DVD)	1920 × 1080	Full HD	1080i, 1080p	24, 25, 30	16:9, 2.21:1	2,073,600
UHDTV (Rec. 2020, Ultra HD Blu-ray)	3840 × 2160	4K UHDTV	2160p	24, 25, 30, 50, 60, 100, 120	16:9	8,294,400
UHDTV (Rec. 2020, Ultra HD Blu-ray)	7680 × 4320	8K UHDTV	4320p	24, 25, 30, 50, 60, 100, 120	16:9	33,177,600

Many of these resolutions are also used for video files that are not broadcast. These may also use other aspect ratios by cropping otherwise black bars at the top and bottom which result from cinema aspect ratios greater than 16∶9, such as 1.85 or 2.35 through 2.40 (dubbed "Cinemascope", "21∶9" etc.), while the standard horizontal resolution, e.g. 1920 pixels, is usually kept. The vertical resolution is usually a multiple of 8 or 16 pixels due to most video codecs processing pixels on such sized blocks. A widescreen FHD video can be 1920 × 800 for a 12∶5 ratio or 1920 × 1040 for roughly 1.85∶1, for instance.

== Films ==
Digital film standards
Standard	Resolution	Display aspect ratio	Total pixels
Digital cinema 2×	2048 × 858	2.39:1	1,757,184
Digital cinema 2×	1998 × 1080	1.85:1	2,157,840
Academy 2×	1828 × 1332	1.37:1	2,434,896
Full Aperture Native 2×	2048 × 1556	1.32:1	3,186,688
Digital cinema 4×	4096 × 1716	2.39:1	7,028,736
Digital cinema 4×	3996 × 2160	1.85:1	8,631,360
Digital Cinema Initiatives 4× (native resolution)	4096 × 2160	1.90:1	8,847,360
Academy 4×	3656 × 2664	1.37:1	9,739,584
Full Aperture 4×	4096 × 3112	1.32:1	12,746,752
6K	6144 × 3160	1.94:1	19,415,040
8K	7992 × 4320	1.85:1	34,525,440
7.2K	7200 × 3060	2.35:1	22,032,000
IMAX Digital	5616 × 4096	1.37:1	23,003,136

The below distinguish SAR (aspect ratio of pixel dimensions), DAR (aspect ratio of displayed image dimensions), and the corresponding PAR (aspect ratio of individual pixels), though it currently contains some errors (inconsistencies), as flagged.

Post-production digital working resolutions
Standard	Resolution	Aspect ratio			Total pixels
Standard	Resolution	Storage	Display	Pixel	Total pixels
DV NTSC	720 × 480	3:2	4:3	10:11	345,600
D1 NTSC	720 × 486	40:27	4:3	9:10	349,920
DV PAL	720 × 576	5:4	4:3	12:11	414,720
D1 PAL	720 × 576	5:4	4:3	16:15	414,720
Panasonic DVCPRO HD 720p	960 × 720	4:3	16:9	4:3	691,200
Panasonic DVCPRO HD 1080, 59.94i	1280 × 1080	32:27	16:9	3:2	1,382,400
Panasonic DVCPRO HD 1080, 50i	1440 × 1080	4:3	16:9	3:2	1,555,200
HDV 1080i/1080p	1440 × 1080	4:3	16:9	4:3	1,555,200
Sony HDCAM (1080)	1440 × 1080	4:3	16:9	3:2	1,555,200
Sony HDCAM SR (1080)	1920 × 1080	16:9	16:9	1:1	2,073,600
Academy 2×	1828 × 1332	1.37:1	1.37:1	1:1	2,434,896
Full Aperture Native 2×	2048 × 1556	1.316	4:3	~1:1	3,186,688
Academy 4×	3656 × 2664	1.37:1	1.37:1	1:1	9,739,584
Full Aperture 4×	4096 × 3112	1.316	4:3	~1:1	12,746,752

== Video conferencing ==
Video conferencing standards
Standard	Resolution	Storage aspect ratio	Total pixels
SQCIF (Sub Quarter CIF)	128 × 96	1.33:1	12,288
QCIF (Quarter CIF)	176 × 144	1.22:1	25,344
CIF (or FCIF)	352 × 288	1.22:1	101,376
4CIF (4 × CIF)	704 × 576	1.22:1	405,504
16CIF (16 × CIF)	1408 × 1152	1.22:1	1,622,016

== CCTV ==
960H is a resolution used in analog CCTV equipment. 960H represents the number of horizontal pixels in a video signal transmitted from a camera or received by a DVR (Digital Video Recorder). The resolution of 960H depends on whether the equipment is PAL or NTSC based: 960H represents 960 × 576 (PAL) or 960 × 480 (NTSC) pixels. 960H represents an increase in pixels of some 30% over standard D1 resolution, which is 720 × 576 pixels (PAL), or 720 × 480 pixels (NTSC). The increased resolution over D1 comes as a result of a longer horizontal scan. The difference is that whilst D1 has a 4:3 aspect ratio 960H has a 16:9 widescreen aspect ratio. The extra pixels are used to form the increased area to the sides of the D1 image. The pixel density of 960H is identical to standard D1 resolution so it does not give any improvement in image quality, merely a wider aspect ratio.

Alternative analog video transport technologies carrying higher resolutions than 960H include HD-TVI, HDCVI, and AHD.
