= Tune Talk =

Malaysian telecommunications company

Tune Talk Sdn. Bhd.
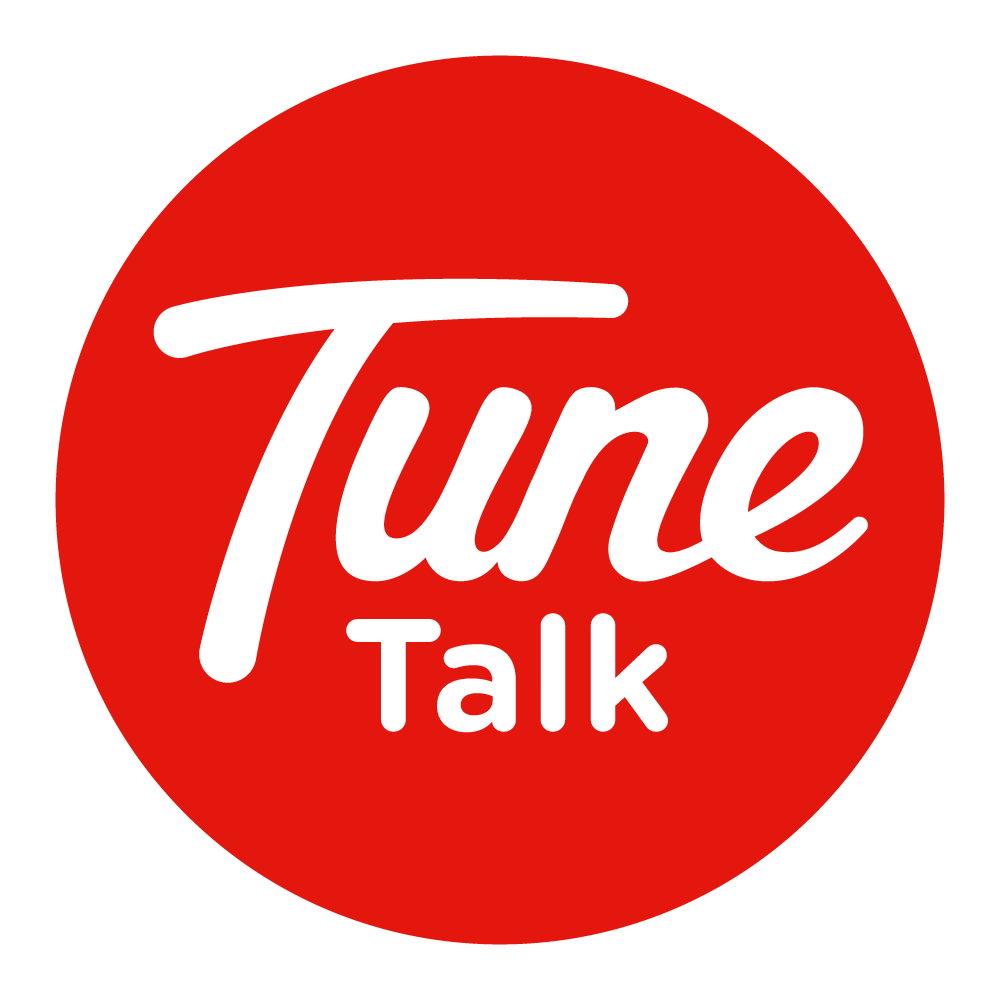
- Company type: Private
- Industry: Telecommunication
- Founded: 13 January 2006; 20 years ago
- Founder: Tony Fernandes
- Headquarters: Kuala Lumpur, Malaysia
- Area served: Malaysia
- Key people: Gurtaj Singh Padda (Executive Director & CEO)
- Products: Mobile Prepaid & Value Added Services
- Parent: Gurtaj Singh Padda (Majority Shareholder) CelcomDigi
- Website: www.tunetalk.com

Tune Talk Sdn. Bhd., doing business as Tune Talk, previously was a mobile virtual network operator (MVNO) riding on the network of Celcom Berhad. Since 2025, Tune Talk has now become a fully cloud-enabled telco, together with Amazon Web Services (AWS), being the first in Malaysia to do so. Tune Talk entered into an MVNO agreement with Celcom in December 2008. In November 2024, co-founder Gurtaj Singh Padda became the majority shareholder and assumes the role of Executive Director and CEO.

Tune Talk Sdn. Bhd. officially launched its commercial service on 19 August 2009 with a pre-fix "010" cellular service by offering lower IDD calling up to 10% cheaper compared with competitors.

Tune Talk's business model emphasizes customer care service and customer experience. It has an in-house customer care department and social media team.

Works are underway to transition the company into a mobile network operator status, having completed migration to the cloud with AWS. Currently, Tune Talk is a MVNO with a licensed Network Service Provider and Application Service Provider with Numbering Block sanctioned by the Malaysian Communications and Multimedia Commission (MCMC). On 21 June 2021, Celcom Berhad announced the sale of its entire mobile operations, including its 35% stake in Tune Talk, to CelcomDigi.

== Top shareholders ==
- Gurtaj Singh Padda – Owning 43%
- CelcomDigi – Owning 35%
- East Pacific Capital Private Limited – Owning 5.8%
- Tune strategic Datuk Shane Akliff Abdullah – Owning 11%

As of November 2024, Gurtaj Singh Padda has control of the largest equity stake in Tune Talk with over 37%. On 23 August 2023, TheEdge, a Malaysian business daily, announced that Gurtaj Singh Padda recently won an arbitration award against Tune Group, Datuk Kalimullah, Lim Kian Onn and Mark Lankaster for the transfer of 850,934 shares at a price of RM3 per share which increased his shareholding in Tune Talk from 9.5% to the current 15.4%. Tune Talk has exactly 15,000,000 shares outstanding per the SSM report thereby implying a company valuation at RM45,000,000 (approximately US$9.7m) for the arbitration award won by Mr Singh.

== Prefix and Subscriber Numbers ==
Assigned by the Malaysian Communications and Multimedia Commission:

- Prefix: 10 | Subscriber numbers: 500 0000 – 549 9999
- Prefix: 10 | Subscriber numbers: 770 0000 – 819 9999
- Prefix: 11 | Subscriber numbers: 1500 0000 – 1549 9999
- Prefix: 11 | Subscriber numbers: 1850 0000 – 1899 9999
- Prefix: 11 | Subscriber numbers: 3500 0000 – 3549 9999
- Prefix: 11 | Subscriber numbers: 3550 0000 – 3599 9999
- Prefix: 11 | Subscriber numbers: 5300 0000 – 5349 9999
- Prefix: 11 | Subscriber numbers: 5350 0000 - 5399 9999

== Data Roaming ==
Tune Talk offers an unlimited data roaming plan for RM38 a day across Bangladesh, Cambodia, Hong Kong, Indonesia, Macao, Philippines, Singapore, Sri Lanka and Taiwan.
