= Celcom Minutes =

Minutes Plan

Minutes is Celcom's brand of postpaid mobile service for 2G and 3G network in Malaysia.

== About ==
Customers are able to choose between the option of postpaid or prepaid plans. Celcom offers three different plans: Prime, Premier, or Elite. Celcom's voice revenue in the first half of 2012 grew 6.2% to RM2.31 billion from the previous corresponding period.

== See also ==
- Celcom
- Xpax
