= Multi-lane free flow in Malaysia =

The multi-lane free flow (MLFF) is a system that allows free-flow high-speed tolling for all highway users. With MLFF, current toll lanes at toll plazas can be replaced with ordinary multilane road segments. By using tags with readers at gantry across the highway to detect vehicles and deduct tolls using the existing Electronic Toll Collection (ETC) when fully implemented. Using only video and automatic license plate recognition it is also possible to have a MLFF system without using tags and readers. This type of solution is implemented in Stockholm for congestion charging purposes.

== Benefits ==
By implementing the MLFF system, traffic congestion at toll plazas can be reduced as the system allows free flow high speed toll systems.

The cost to maintain and operate toll collection system is also much lower compared to the current system. With MLFF implementation, toll operator at lane and plaza is minimally required. In current system, the collected cash and data will be managed at plaza level by toll operators. MLFF on the other hand will use back end purse system where the deduction of toll collection and user account will be handled by Central Clearing House at TNG. The current toll plaza canopy will be replaced by a gantry installed with antenna for the purpose of reading the sticker tag or vehicle plate number. This new concept means that toll plaza is no longer required (or much smaller than current toll plaza size) which therefore reduce the construction and operation cost. As for the user, they only need to get the sticker tag and register to their vehicle. Compared to current system, the sticker user needs to get is much cheaper compared to the SmartTAG in-vehicle unit, which costs RM130 to install the In-Vehicle Unit (IU).

== Differences ==
No	Touch 'n Go	SmartTAG	MyRFiD
1.	Card with embedded microchip	An in-vehicle unit	Radio-frequency identification tag (RFID)
2.	Contactless card with antenna	Use infrared transmission	Use microwave transmission (Active & Passive)
3.	Used at dedicated toll lanes with automatic barriers	Used at dedicated toll lanes with automatic barriers	No toll lanes/gates, uses gantry system
4.	Reduced speed at Touch ‘n Go lanes	Reduced speed at SmartTAG lanes	Faster traveling speed

== MLFF trial run ==
The MLFF trial run is carried out by Teras Teknologi (TERAS) under instruction by Malaysian Highway Authority (MHA) to test, evaluate and report the effectiveness of the new highway system and technology before the start of gradual implementation at all highways.

The MLFF trial run will be carried out for the next 6 to 12 months from December 2008. A report on system feasibility, user acceptance and behavioral patterns, enforcement mechanism and proposed project financing will be submitted for cabinet recommendation and approval by Parliament.

In 2021, Green Packet Bhd (Green Packet) and FETC International Co. (FETCi) will run Malaysia’s first ever Multi Lane Free Flow (MLFF) tolling system Proof of Concept (POC) on Malaysian highways. The MLFF POC will be installed at Besraya KM5.5 (North Bound) near Mines South toll plaza and is scheduled for data collection for three months starting early 2022.

== MLFF trial tag lane ==
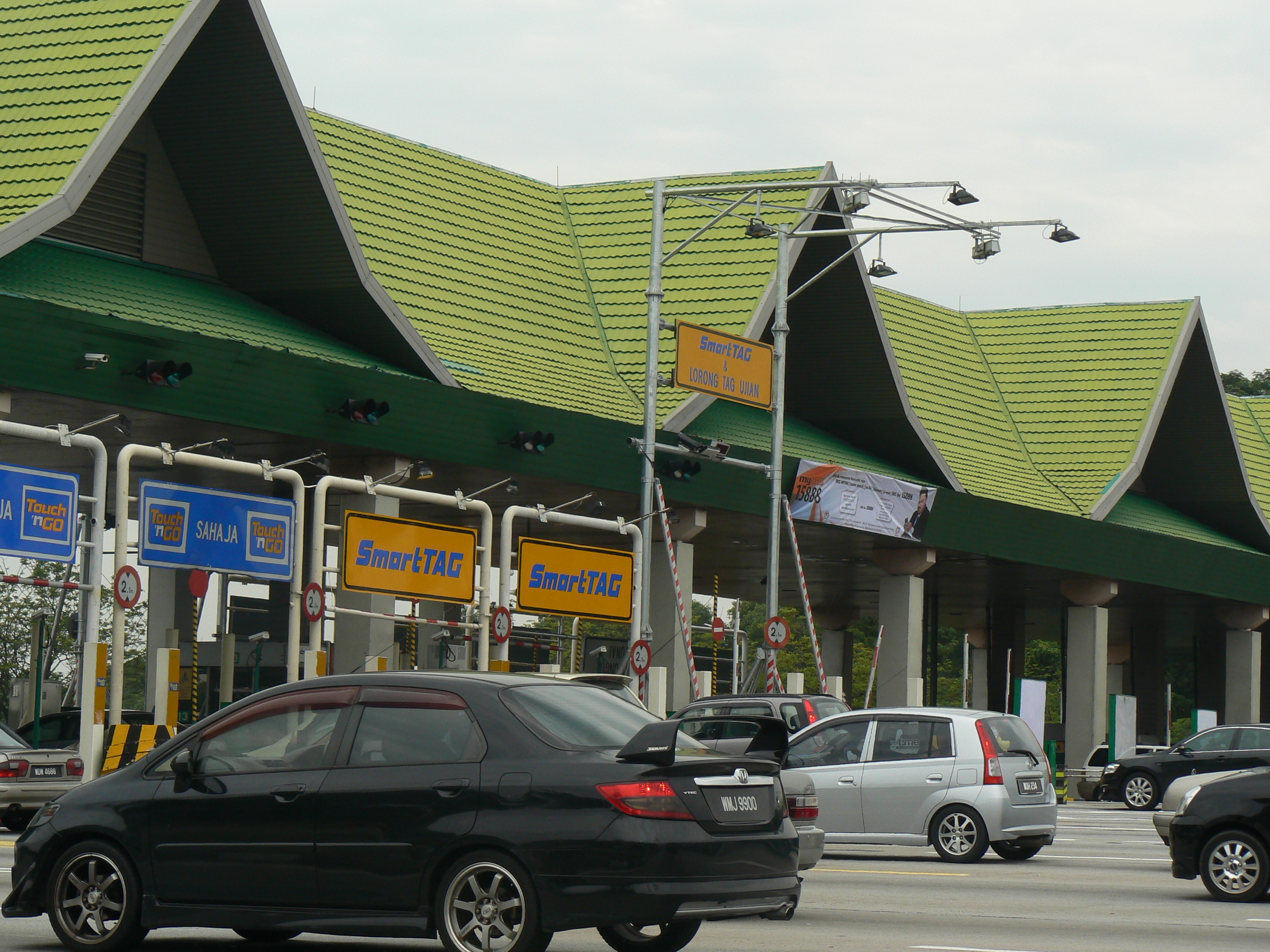
MLFF Trial at Batu Tiga Toll Plaza

- PLUS Expressways Batu Tiga toll plaza on FH2 Federal Highway using single piece on-board unit (OBU). Test directive by MHA to Teras Teknologi and Kapsch with 1,000 test users. Transaction via microwave OBU utilising Touch 'n Go payment gateway.

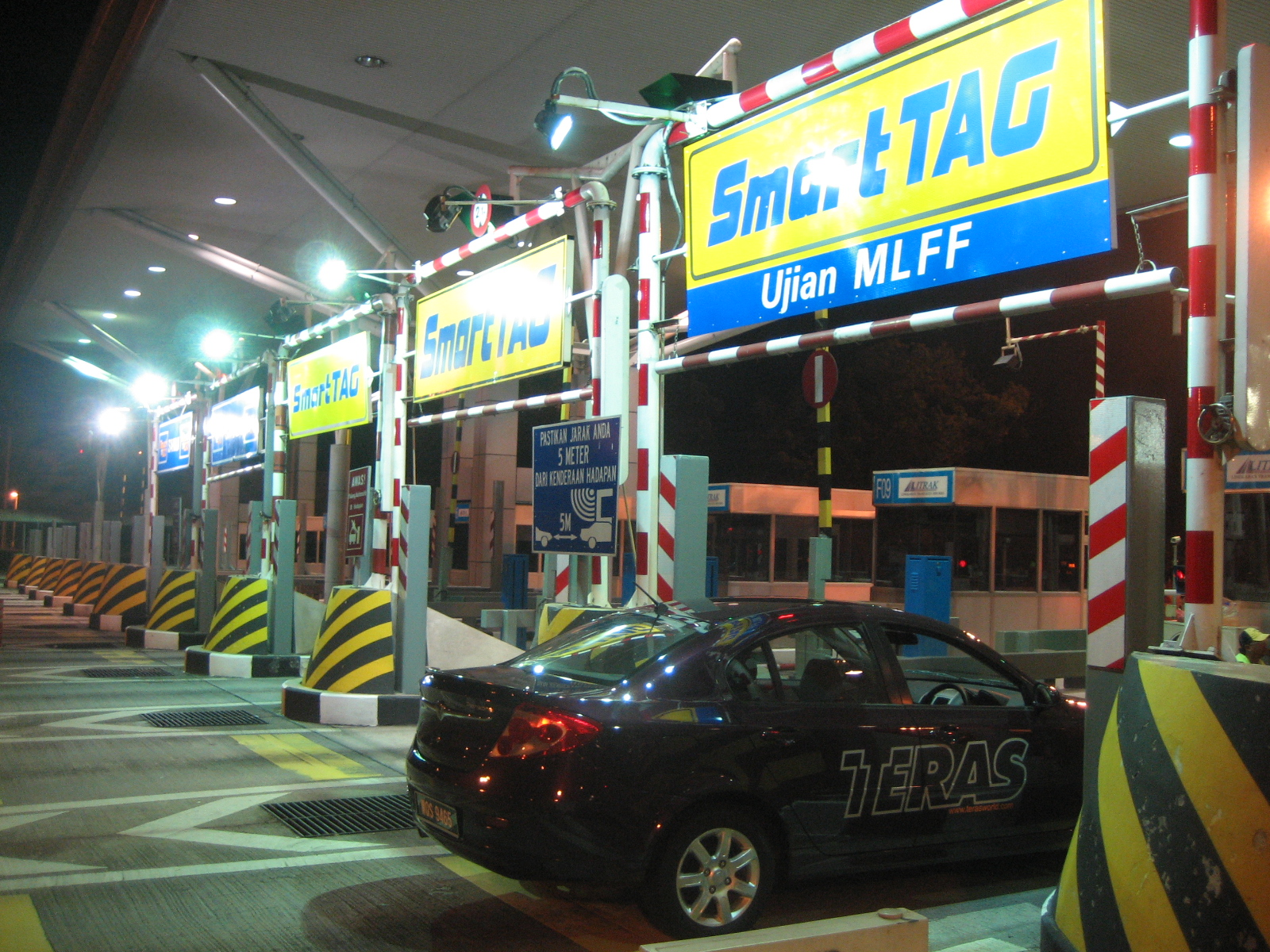
MLFF Trial at Penchala Toll Plaza

- E11 Damansara–Puchong Expressway, Penchala Toll Plaza In/Out bound using two-piece on-board unit. Test directive by MHA to Teras Teknologi and Mitsubishi Heavy Industries with 100 test users. Transaction via microwave OBU combi with Touch ‘n Go card utilising Touch ‘n Go payment gateway.

== See also ==
- SmartTAG
- Touch 'n Go
- Touch 'n Go RFID
- Multi-Lane Free Flow
