= Vcash =

Defunct Malaysian e-wallet service

vcash
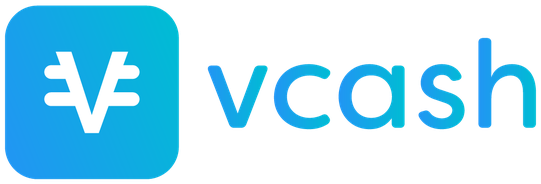
- Website type: e-wallet
- Available in: English
- Founded: 10 November 2017; 8 years ago
- Dissolved: 30 November 2019; 6 years ago
- Headquarters: Shah Alam, Selangor, Malaysia
- Owner: Digi Telecommunications Sdn. Bhd. (Telenor Group)
- Key people: Praveen Rajan (Digi CDO); Kathryn Lee (Product lead)
- Website: https://vcash.my at the Wayback Machine (archived May 16, 2019)
- Commercial: Yes
- Registration: Required
- Current status: Inactive

vcash was a Malaysian digital wallet and online payment platform established in Shah Alam in November 2017, by Digi Telecommunications, a subsidiary of Telenor Group. vcash allowed users to make payments in local stores via a QR code, pay bills, top-up prepaid mobile phones, and do P2P transfers. Despite being a Digi product, user registration and usage of this service was opened to both Digi and non-Digi customers. Its competitors were GrabPay, Touch 'n Go eWallet, and Axiata's Boost. On 1 November 2019, Digi announced they were discontinuing vcash on 30 November 2019, two years after its launch, which were attributed to stiff competition from competitors that provide rewards to their users to retain customers in their services.

== History ==
Digi Telecommunications launched vcash on 10 November 2017 in collaboration with Valyou Sdn Bhd, an e-cash issuing company authorized by the Central Bank of Malaysia. It was one of the first e-wallets in Malaysia. Despite being a Digi product, user registration and usage of this service was opened to both Digi and non-Digi customers. At that time of its launch, vcash had 500 touch points and 80 merchants nationwide that accepted vcash payments, and had plans to expand their services to more than 2000 merchants by the end of 2017. Digi claimed their transaction fee rate was at 0.8%, much lower compared to competing e-wallet services in Malaysia at the time. On 6 August 2018, Digi partnered with AmBank to enable merchants with AmBank point-of-sale terminals to accept vcash.

== Services ==
vcash was used on smartphones using their vcash app. It utilized QR code technology as the payment method for local in-store payments. However, unlike competing services where users were required to show a random QR code generated on their app to be scanned by the merchant, vcash provided a QR code on their app in the store which could be scanned to make a payment. vcash also provided features such as utility bill payment, P2P transfer and prepaid mobile phone top-ups.

vcash also allowed online check-out on merchant and e-commerce websites whose payment systems were powered by iPay88 or MOLPay online payment gateway networks.

Users could deposit cash into their vcash account in Digi stores or with credit or debit cards via FPX or JomPAY online gateway services. Users could transfer cash from their vcash account to their Maybank account or collect their cash at a Digi store with payment of a minimum fee.

== Closure ==
On 1 November 2019, Digi announced it would discontinue the operation and development of vcash on 30 November 2019, two years after its introduction. It became one of the first e-wallet services in Malaysia to close. Its users were able to ask for a refund of any balance remaining in their account.

The closure of vcash was attributed to stiff competition from competing e-wallet services with greater venture capital financing than vcash. vcash had been experiencing a decline in the number of active users on a quarterly basis. When contacted by RinggitPlus regarding the closure, Digi stated closing down vcash was simply the result of a change in business strategy. Two days after the closure of vcash, Praveen Rajan, CDO of Digi, said the e-wallet market in Malaysia was too competitive because each competing service provided rewards or a cashback program or other subsidies to their users to retain their customers in their services. He stated these tactics were used as their main value proposition.

== Reception ==
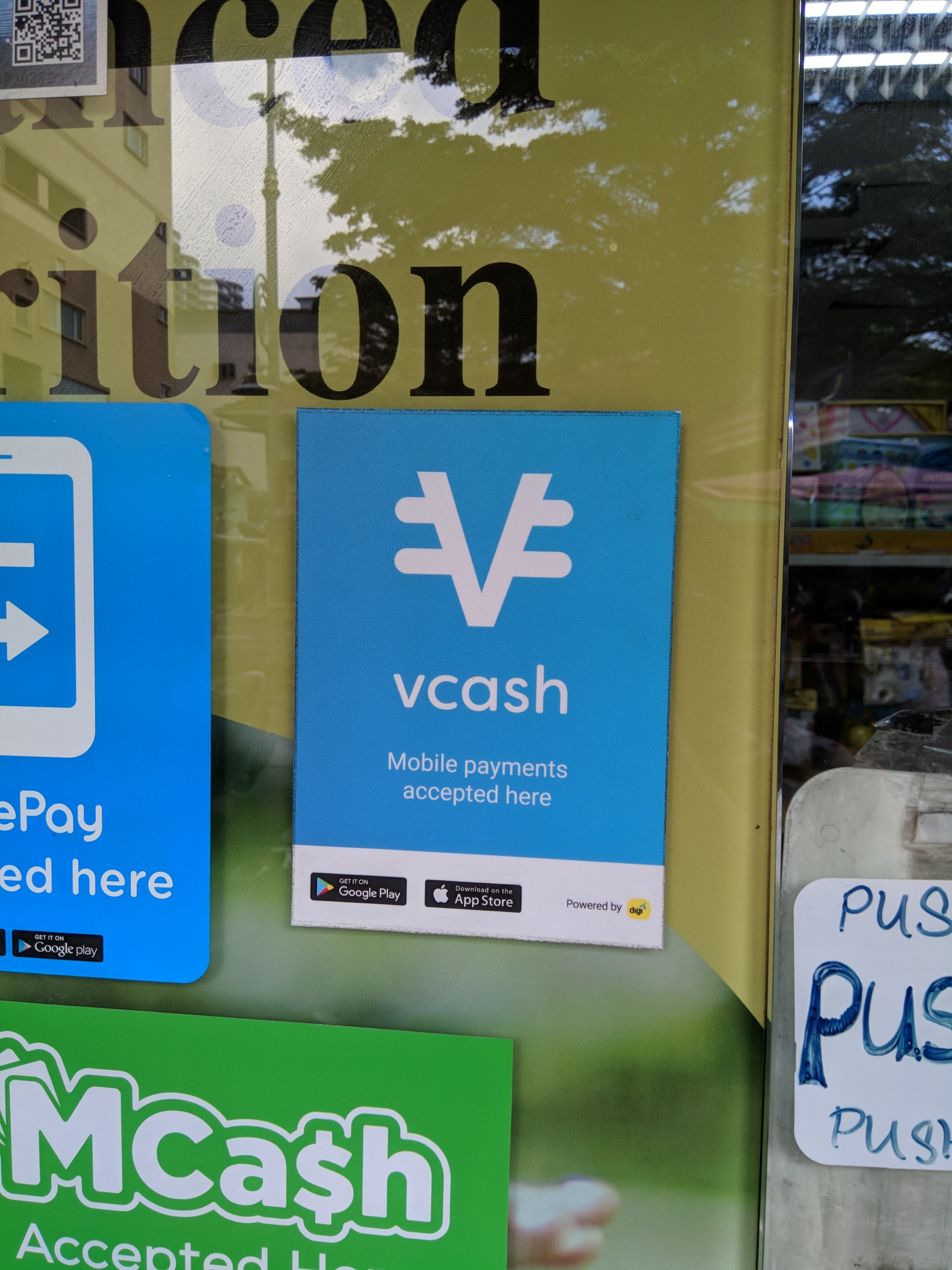
A signage in pharmacy at Brickfields showing vcash is accepted in this shop

=== Market share ===
Data from App Annie and iPrice ranked vcash fifth in the top five e-wallet applications in Malaysia by monthly active users in the first quarter of 2018 before disappearing from the top five in the second quarter onward. Since its release, vcash ranked fifth in the top five e-wallet applications in Malaysia by total app downloads in the fourth quarter of 2017. It later jumped to third place in this category in the first quarter of 2018, only to fall to fifth place in the second quarter of 2018 before disappearing from the top five in third quarter of 2018.

=== Merchant response ===
Some merchants including Hainanese restaurant Yut Kee Coffee Shop and juice bar Life Juice, who were early adopters of vcash, viewed the service positively. Merchants praised the low transaction fee rate, noting the adoption of e-wallet services led to shorter queueing times, improved the customer service experience at reduced costs, and allowed for better understanding of customers' behavior using the services' analytical tools.

=== Support from government ===
The Malaysian Ministry of Youth and Sports make vcash a preferred cashless payment platform at their headquarters, restaurants, and gym in February 2018. Khairy Jamaluddin, the minister at the time, said the adoption of e-wallet as a payment system allowed Malaysia to move towards the goal of becoming a cashless nation.

== See also ==
- Telenor Microfinance Bank - a financial service operated by Telenor in Pakistan
- Mobi Banka - a financial service operated by Telenor in Serbia
- Touch 'n Go eWallet - an alternative e-wallet service in Malaysia
