= Touch 'n Go eWallet =

Malaysian e-wallet service

- Website type: e-wallet
- Available in: English, Malay, Chinese
- Headquarters: Bangsar South, Kuala Lumpur, Malaysia
- Area served: Malaysia, Overseas (only the country that supports it )
- Owners: Touch 'n Go Sdn Bhd (45.24%); Ant Financial (43.47%); ASP Malaysia LP (7.52%); AIA Malaysia Bhd. (3.76%)
- Key people: Alan Ni (CEO)
- Industry: Financial services Payment processor Financial technology
- Products: Electronic payment processing Mobile payment
- Website: www.touchngo.com.my
- Commercial: Yes
- Registration: Required
- Users: Over 15 million users (January 2021)
- Launched: 24 July 2017; 9 years ago
- Current status: Active

Touch 'n Go eWallet is a Malaysian digital wallet and online payment platform, established in Kuala Lumpur, Malaysia, in July 2017 as a joint venture between Touch 'n Go and Ant Financial. It allows users to make payments at over 280,000 merchant touch points via QR code, as well as perform peer-to-peer (P2P) money transfers.

Since then, the e-wallet further diversified for users to pay for tolls via RFID or PayDirect, street parking and various online payment spanning e-hailing, car-sharing apps or taxis, various overhead bills; top-up for mobile prepaid or in-game currencies; purchases on e-commerce websites; food delivery; renewing motor insurance and other insurance/takaful plans; and even movie, bus, trains or airline tickets.

== Background ==
Prior to the launch of the e-wallet service, Touch 'n Go provided stored-value physical all-in-one contactless card (namely Touch 'n Go cards or "TnG cards") that users can use to pay for toll fares, public transportation and parking lots as well as purchases in some retail stores. In 1999, Touch 'n Go also markets SmartTag devices that allow road users to pass through certain toll booths without the need to unwind the car window. The high entry cost of the device (around RM 100 each) also meant that only few can enjoy the seamless experience.

In 2009, Touch 'n Go partnered with Maxis to launch FastTap, a new mobile payment service that utilised Near-Field Communication (NFC). Maxis customers can make payments by placing the phone near the card readers (that also supports physical bank cards and Touch ’N Go cards). However, the venture featured only one phone model, Nokia 6212, which greatly limited the public reach.

In July 2012, Touch 'n Go announced another collaboration with CIMB and Maxis to create similar NFC-based online transaction service that runs on compatible smartphones.

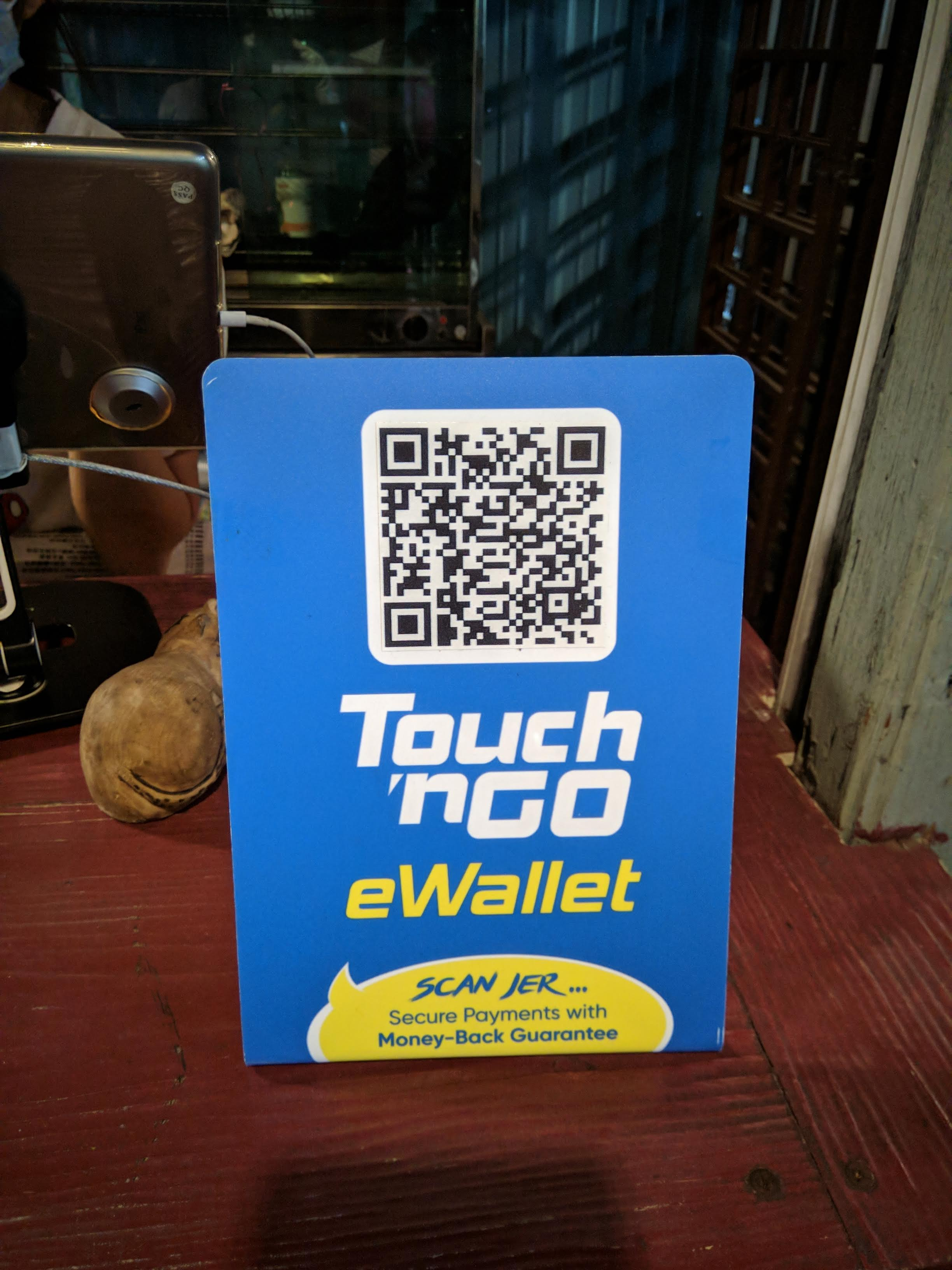
Touch 'n Go merchant touchpoint. Touch 'n Go relies on QR codes to make a payment.

Touch 'n Go Wallet was launched in February 2017 as an QR code-based e-wallet application, to compete with Samsung Pay that utilizes NFC modules. In the controlled pilot test in Taman Tun Dr Ismail, the correspondents can experience basic functionalities (prepaid mobile service reload, bills payment, movie tickets and flight tickets purchase, transfer of money with another user, and payments at participating stores and restaurants).

While the deployed version of the app was generally well-received, the existing process to transfer the balance to the physical TnG card stored value from the app garnered unanimous backlash. Test groups felt that the need to head to a self-service terminal named "Pick Up Device" in person within 24 hours for completion, along with the failure to do so (the balance would be credited back to the wallet after 24 hours), was not divulged clearly and also defeated the purpose of convenience, not to mention there were only 2 such terminals. The feature was eventually suspended.

On 15 November 2017, Touch 'n Go was granted permission by the Central Bank of Malaysia to form a joint venture with Ant Financial, a Chinese-based financial company that operates Alipay. The partnership allowed the local e-wallet to learn from and build upon the operational model pioneered by Alipay.

In June 2018, it was reported that Touch 'n Go was pilot testing the uses of the Touch 'n Go eWallet in Rapid Transit, as the ticketing system was enabled on the Kelana Jaya line in the Klang Valley. Pilot testing only applied to stations in Kelana Jaya, KL Gateway–Universiti, Kerinchi, KL Sentral, Dang Wangi, KLCC, and Ampang Park. The test was reported to be successful in February 2020 and was planned to be fully deployed on the LRT and MRT. Due to unforeseen circumstances, this feature did not come into fruition, the app merely adds in-app purchase of monthly concession cards called "My50".

In August 2018, Touch 'n Go announced that selected drivers may experience first-hand a new RFID-based payment (later rebranded as "myRFID") that serves to replace SmartTag devices on closed toll roads with during pilot testing phase commencing on 3 September 2018. On 2 November 2018, participation in the ongoing pilot programme was expanded, allowing more drivers to sign up ahead of the public rollout of the RFID system.

During the same period, Touch 'n Go has discontinued the sales of SmartTAG devices in favor of the RFID-based payment system. Initially, the installation of the RFID chip onto the car could only be done by Touch 'n Go staff at the RFID fitment centers, at no cost. As the pilot testing concluded on 15 February 2020, a self-installation kit are being offered to the public on Lazada and Shopee.

Support for taxi-hailing mobile apps was added in November 2018 when Touch 'n Go partnered with EzCab and Public Cab, allowing users to make payments via QR code. This was later expanded to support MULA on 7 January 2020, and later MyCar on 4 April 2020.

Touch 'n Go eWallet was also the first eWallet to convert Kuala Lumpur's most famous Ramadan bazaar in Kampong Bahru into "Kampong Kashless", a venue that can accept cashless QR payments. It welcomed more than 250,000 Malaysians including local celebrities and government officials.

On 1 October 2019, some e-commerce websites owned by the Alibaba Group (TMall and Taobao) began to support Touch 'n Go eWallet payments, Lazada joined the list on 29 October 2019.

Touch 'n Go eWallet was one of the three e-wallet services in Malaysia (the other being Boost and GrabPay) that was eligible for its users to receive an RM 30 credit in conjunction of E-Tunai Rakyat program under the Budget 2020 plan, that further normalizes adoption of cashless and mobile payment among Malaysians. Unlike Boost and GrabPay, whose P2P transfers were completely disabled until users have exhausted the RM 30 first, Touch 'n Go eWallet did not impose such measures.

in 2020, Touch 'n Go eWallet joined DuitNow, an electronic transaction ecosystem in Malaysia which allows the funds from Touch 'n Go eWallet to be transferred to other competing services and vice versa, by implementing a standard DuitNow QR code design.

Japan become the first country outside Malaysia to support Touch 'n Go eWallet payment via Alipay Connect.

During the COVID-19 pandemic and the enforcement of the movement control order, use of eWallets (including Touch 'n Go eWallet) increased tremendously among citizens due to its contactless nature of the payment and increased take-out orders at home; which in turn helped small and medium-sized enterprises to thrive.

Touch 'n Go eWallet launched its loyalty programme – The Goal Hunter – in October 2020 where on monthly basis, users collect stamps by paying with the app in exchange for rewards that include lucky draws and other vouchers.

== Services ==
Touch 'n Go eWallet app is available for download on both Google Play and Apple Appstore. It utilizes QR code technology for local in-store payments. The Touch 'n Go eWallet app also diversifies payment types, including but not limited to

- Utility bills
- Purchase of motor insurance policy
- Pay Later facility
- Prepaid reload and Postpaid payment to telecommunications companies
- loan repayments for courts, MBSJ payments, zakat and PTPTN
- payment for car parking
- P2P transfer
- airline ticket bookings;
- movie tickets from TGV Cinemas
- RFID refuelling at Shell stations (defunct after Shell launched its own payment app in 2024)

User can reload the eWallet credit by setting up auto-reload, purchasing reload pins from convenience stores (such as 7-Eleven, KK Super Mart, MyNews, Family Mart etc.), reloading by FPX and credit/debit card.

The PayDirect feature allows users to link their physical Touch 'n Go cards into the eWallet, where the toll fare can be debited from the eWallet balance when flashing the card near the sensor. In the circumstance of insufficient balance in the app, the toll fare will be deducted from the physical card's balance instead. This also conveniently allows users to view the card's remaining balance.

Touch 'n Go eWallet is the first and only eWallet to offer a money-back guarantee when an unauthorised transaction is made on the user’s eWallet account, subject to Terms & Conditions.

Payment via QR code scanning, including Touch 'n Go eWallet, becomes a norm in most of the shops/restaurants across Malaysia, including roadside hawkers/stall owners and automatic vending machines. The merchants usually display their owner's individual QR or Business account that they can apply for in-app. The popularity attributes to the low merchant onboarding cost (Unlike NFC payment and debit/credit card that requires purchase or rental of a payment terminal device at a yearly fee.)

The app is also one of the few ewallet that supports bidirectional liquidity (alongside MAE developed by Maybank), where funds can be transferred two-way with bank accounts. This is not possible with the other major ewallets (GrabPay, Boost, ShopeePay etc.) where the money that is reloaded to the wallet cannot be transferred to another bank account, unless through manual requests at the discretion of the treasury/accounting team.

=== Grievance with older Touch 'n Go cards ===
The inability to transfer between the balance of older Touch 'n Go cards due to the innate limitation in the hardware (MIFARE RFID) of older cards has always been a grievance for the users. While the app can deduct the toll fare from the linked card through PayDirect and allows users to view the card interim balance, the card balance reload is fed through different parallel pathways that sometimes incurs RM 0.50 service charge. Only cash with fixed denomination (RM 10 minimum) is accepted as the mode of payment to reload the card balance (despite the concurrent breakthrough in NFC and QR code based payment) and the purchase is not eligible for points to the loyalty programme of the merchant as well. The reloading process also takes slightly longer time when the reader lags or glitches. "Watson's" and "Caring" Pharmacy outlets still charges no fee for reloading it besides the self-service reload machines. "BHP Petrol" outlet The only 24-hour reload location with a staff on highways.

=== New Enhanced Touch 'n Go cards ===
In 2024, an improved version of the card, "Enhanced Touch 'n Go" card is launched. Featuring NFC capability, the reload can be made either conventionally like older TnG cards with merchants or electronically through the phone (place it adjacent to NFC sensor at the back of the phone).

The card balance are still separate from the ewallet balance. The selling price averages around RM 15.

=== Non-Transferrable Balance for Reload PINs ===
Prior to 25 March 2022, the versatility of the app to reload using PIN numbers purchased from convenience stores and P2P transfers, as well as the bidirectional liquidity to simply transfer to any bank account leads to an unexpected consequence; the app outperforms the bank's Cash Deposit Machines, (that used to operate from 6am to 12am, barring system downtime) aided by the fact that most convenience stores operates 24 hours. Unlike CDMs which is limited by location and operation hour and also bank-specific, the network of each brand's convenience stores also meant unprecedented accessibility at nearer location any time of the day regardless of the bank that you use.

This however all came to an end on 25 Mar 2022, where a new policy is rolled out to classify balances from reload pin is marked as "Non-Transferrable" that can't flow to the banking ecosystem by P2P transfer and can only be used for own purchases and toll payments.

=== Budi Madani RON95 programme ===
On 27 Sep 2025, Malaysian government launched Budi95 programme to replace its existing flat subsidy on RON95 petrol at selling price of RM 2.05 per litre, where only Malaysians with a driving license is eligible for certain monthly quota of said petrol purchase at subsidised price of RM 1.99 per litre. Otherwise, said petrol can still be purchased at a floating rate (that fluctuates between RM 2.50 to RM 4.07 each litre).

Touch 'n Go eWallet, alongside Setel (payment app by Petronas) has pre-emptively rolled out updates to accommodate for such policy on the same day, that greatly reduces a lot of logistical friction for the users.

It would eventually become the payment partner for Shell App (Shell Asia App in Android) on 26 November 2025.

== Fundraising ==
During the COVID-19 pandemic and the enforcement of the movement control order in 2020, Touch 'n Go introduced the charity fundraising program that allows users to make donations via Touch 'n Go eWallet.

In the first year, the donation transactions facilitated amounts to RM 5,432,319 through a total of 215,314 transactions. The fund is then funnelled to 22 local non-governmental organizations, including Tzu Chi Foundation, Make A Wish Foundation, Malaysian Red Crescent Society, Rotary Club, and Malaysian AIDS Council.

== Reception ==
User base for Touch 'n Go eWallet
Period	Number of users	Ref
June 2019	4 million	
July 2019	4.3 million	
January 2020	7 million	
February 2020	9 million	
April 2020	10 million	
January 2021	Over 15 million	

User base for RFID usage
Period	Number of users	Ref
April 2019	100,000	
May 2019	200,000	
February 2020	1.2 million	
January 2021	1.5 million	

Touch 'n Go eWallet merchants
Period	Number of merchants	Ref
July 2019	50,000	
October 2019	100,000	
January 2020	120,000	
February 2020	135,000	
January 2021	280,000	

== See also ==
- vcash, one of the earliest defunct mobile e-wallet platforms in Malaysia
