= Xpax =

CelcomDigi Prepaid 5G UV
- Type: Prepaid and mobile internet plans
- Inventor: Telekom Malaysia
- Inception: 2004; 22 years ago
- Manufacturer: Celcom (2004–2023); CelcomDigi (2023–present)
- Available: Malaysia
- Models: CelcomDigi Mobile (2004–present)
- Slogan: Creating a world inspired by you
- Website: www.celcomdigi.com/prepaid/uv

CelcomDigi Prepaid 5G UV, launched in 2004, (formerly Xpax), is a Malaysian Celcom a subsidiaries of CelcomDigi line of prepaid mobile plan. As of December 2017, it served over 6.72 million subscribers, it comprises the majority of Celcom’s 9.56 million total subscriber base

== Services ==
CelcomDigi Prepaid 5G UV offers prepaid and mobile internet plans through the CelcomDigi network. It is the first prepaid service to offer 4G LTE, (and then 5G NR) connectivity in Malaysia.

== Brand ==
Xpax features two sub-brands. S.O.X. (School of X) is aimed at school children and teens aged 13–17 years. U.O.X. (University of X) is aimed at university and college students aged 17–23 years.

Since 2013, the brand has employed the tagline “Got 4G LTE Time!”.
