= Touch 'n Go =

Malaysian smart payment card

- Location: Malaysia
- Launched: 18 March 1997; 29 years ago
- Technology: MIFARE Classic - Contactless smart card
- Operator: CIMB Bank
- Manager: Touch 'n Go Sdn. Bhd.
- Currency: MYR
- Stored-value: Pay as you go - Generic Card
- Credit expiry: 12 months if dormant
- Auto recharge: Touch 'n Go Zing Card
- Unlimited use: Rapid KL MY50
- Validity: Expressway; Public transport; Parking; Retail
- Retailed: Touch 'n Go Hubs & Hotspots
- Variants: Generic Card; Corporate Card; Auto-Reload Card; NFC Enhanced Card; eWallet
- Website: www.touchngo.com.my

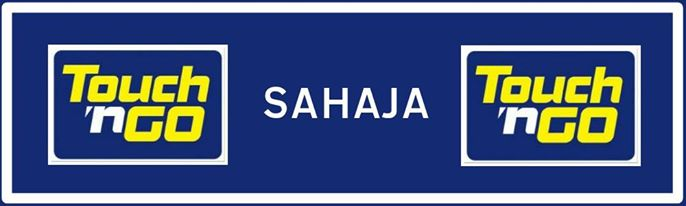
Touch 'n Go lane signboard

Touch 'n Go is a contactless smart card system used for electronic payments in Malaysia. The system was introduced in 1997 and is widely used for toll payments on highways, public transportation, parking, and other services. The card is equipped with a radio-frequency identification (RFID) chip that allows users to make payments by simply tapping the card on a reader device. Touch 'n Go cards can be reloaded with funds either online or at designated reload kiosks. The system has become a popular and convenient way for Malaysians to make cashless transactions.

== History ==
Touch 'n Go was developed by Teras Teknologi Sdn Bhd while the brand and the Real Time Gross Settlement (central clearing house systems) are owned and operated by Rangkaian Segar Sdn Bhd, now known as Touch 'n Go Sdn Bhd. The first Touch 'n Go system was installed and used at Jalan Pahang Toll Plaza on 18 March 1997. It was then immediately extended to Jalan Cheras toll plaza and the E37 East–West Link Expressway toll plaza on 15 April 1997. The Touch 'N Go toll payment system was fully implemented throughout the 848 km E1/E2 North–South Expressway on 15 November 1998. This was made possible when the service was extended to the northern sections of the highway from Jelapang to Jitra. As such the smart card can be used to pay toll from Kempas in Johor to Jitra in Kedah, making it one of the world's longest single stretches of expressway to have electronic toll payment systems. The official launch was at the Sungai Dua toll plaza and officiated by Rangkaian Segar Sdn Bhd's then-chairman, Datuk Dr Ramli Mohamad.

The Touch 'n Go system was implemented in Cityliner Sdn Bhd, a stage bus service in Klang Valley in 2000. Touch 'n Go card users enjoyed discount fares of 10% when it was first introduced. Due to the need to further consolidate company operations, card users were required to pay full fare prices after 13 November 2003. However, the Touch 'n Go card reader system on board buses was not well maintained by the bus operator. Card readers often malfunctioned and were not updated. Another subsidiary of Park May Berhad, City Profile Sdn Bhd, a feeder bus service (service known as Putraline) for PUTRA LRT was also introduced, and the system was successfully implemented until the Rapid KL bus revamp program took place.

The Touch 'n Go facility was also embedded in the Buy N Fly loyalty card rewards program for Malaysia Airlines' retail arm, Golden Boutiques Sdn Bhd's which was launched in December 1999. The hybrid cards are multi-function at the rewards airpoint, MEPS Cash and Touch 'n Go. However, on 16 July 2002, Malaysia Airlines announced that the Buy N Fly Programme had ceased operations and consolidated its loyalty rewards into one entity, Malaysia Airlines Enrich Frequent Flyer Programme. Buy N Fly cards are no longer issued but active hybrid card users are still able to use them to perform transactions.

== Card categories ==
The cards can be categorized into three types:

=== Generic cards ===
==== Classic card ====
A standard stored-value Touch 'n Go card fare structure is currently available for adult fare for public transportation and standard class vehicles with two axles and three or four wheels (Class 1), excluding taxis for toll fare. It is like a top-up card.

The card is derived from several designs.

==== NFC card ====
The Touch 'n Go card, which is enhanced with NFC technology to enable reload via the Touch 'n Go eWallet, allows us to reload wherever you are and at any time. The enhanced card is currently sold via Touch 'n Go eWallet at cost of RM10.00 per card.

==== Identity card ====
MyKad is embedded with the Touch 'n Go chip since 2001.

The newly released MyKad from 2026 will no longer include a Touch 'n Go chip.

==== Co-Branded Cards ====
===== PLUSMiles card =====
There is also a PLUSMiles Touch n' Go card, which is available on the North–South Expressway. The card provides a 5% rebate to users of expressways operated by PLUS (E1, E2, E3, E6, E15, E29 and E36) driving in private non-commercial vehicles.

===== MyRapid card =====
Public transportation monthly pass for Rapid KL services.

===== TESCO Clubcard =====
Since 2014, the Malaysian edition of Tesco Clubcard is embedded with Touch 'n Go features.

==== Dual Currency Card ====
EZ-Link x Touch ‘n Go Motoring Card can be use as a contactless payment at both countries except for public transportation (MRT, LRT & busses) in Singapore. However, its only catered for Singapore registered vehicles travelling between Singapore and Malaysia.

=== Corporate cards ===
==== Fleet Xs card ====
It is mainly used for toll fare payment. Company name, vehicle registration number and vehicle class details are printed on the card. A credit term of 30 days is given for post payment and fleet operators are able to monitor toll record/vehicle movement at highways via e-statement (itemised statement) after 24 to 48 hours from the time of transaction.

==== Biz Xs card ====
It is the same as the standard card, mainly for corporate users.

=== Auto-reload card ===
==== Zing Card ====
The Touch 'n Go Zing Card is a companion card (works as a generic card) that is linked to Visa, MasterCard or American Express issued by participating banks in Malaysia. Each time the card balance falls below RM50, it triggers the auto-reload mechanism to reload RM100 onto the card. The amount is charged to the credit card plus RM2 as an auto-reload fee for each reload. The auto-reload function is only available on road tolls when the threshold trigger occurs; if the card is used to pay other services such as trains and car parks, it will not trigger the auto-reload. The auto-reload card cannot be manually reload value same as generic card.

Participating banks are:

- CIMB Bank
- Maybank
- Hong Leong Bank
- Bank Simpanan Nasional
- Affin Bank
- AEON Credit Service

The Zing card auto-reload facility is currently offered as a bank card.

== Purchase and reload ==
Generally, a standard card can be purchased at the price of RM10, without any loaded value. Cards may be reloaded in multiples of RM 10 (counters and some self-service machines) or RM 5 (self-service machines only).

=== Self-service machines ===
- Credit/debit card self-service kiosk (SSK) – (American Express, Mastercard and Visa)
  - Touch 'n Go Hub, Lot L2.07, Level 2, NU Sentral Shopping Centre
  - Touch 'n Go Hub, Ground Floor, Tower 2A, Avenue 5, Bangsar South
  - Nilai Lay-By (South Bound)
  - Subang Toll Plaza (Outbound)
  - Ebor North Toll Plaza (Inbound)
- Cash/Touch 'n Go eWallet Self-Service Kiosk (SSK)
  - KL Sentral (at the Kelana Jaya Line concourse)
  - All Kajang Line stations
  - Ampang Line, Sri Petaling Line, Kelana Jaya Line and KL Monorail major stations
  - Selected shopping malls in Kuala Lumpur and Selangor and Johor
  - Selected rest areas along PLUS and LPT
  - Bank Negara Malaysia headquarters
  - Kuala Lumpur International Airport

=== Cash/credit card counters ===
- Touch 'n Go Hubs:
  - Nu Sentral
  - The Sphere (Bangsar South, Kuala Lumpur)
  - Wisma Nufri, Johor Bahru
- Toll Plaza Offices
- Rapid KL; LRT, MRT, Monorail, BRT major stations and bus hubs.
- KTM Komuter major stations
- Reload Agents
  - Petronas Kedai Mesra
  - 7-Eleven
  - Watsons store
  - Tesco
  - Giant Hypermarket

=== Cash drive-through counters ===
- Toll plazas with the "Tambah Nilai" sign

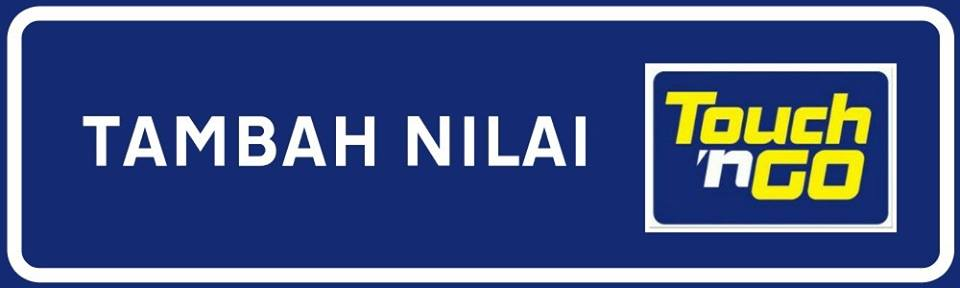
Touch 'n Go reload lane signboard.

=== Auto Teller Machines ===
- Maybank (both Malaysia and Singapore)
- Public Bank
- CIMB Bank (both Malaysia and Singapore)
- RHB Bank
- Bank Muamalat
- AmBank Cash Deposit Machine

== Card usage ==
The Touch 'n Go card is not only for toll fare but also parking services, public transport, theme park and cashless payment at retail outlets.

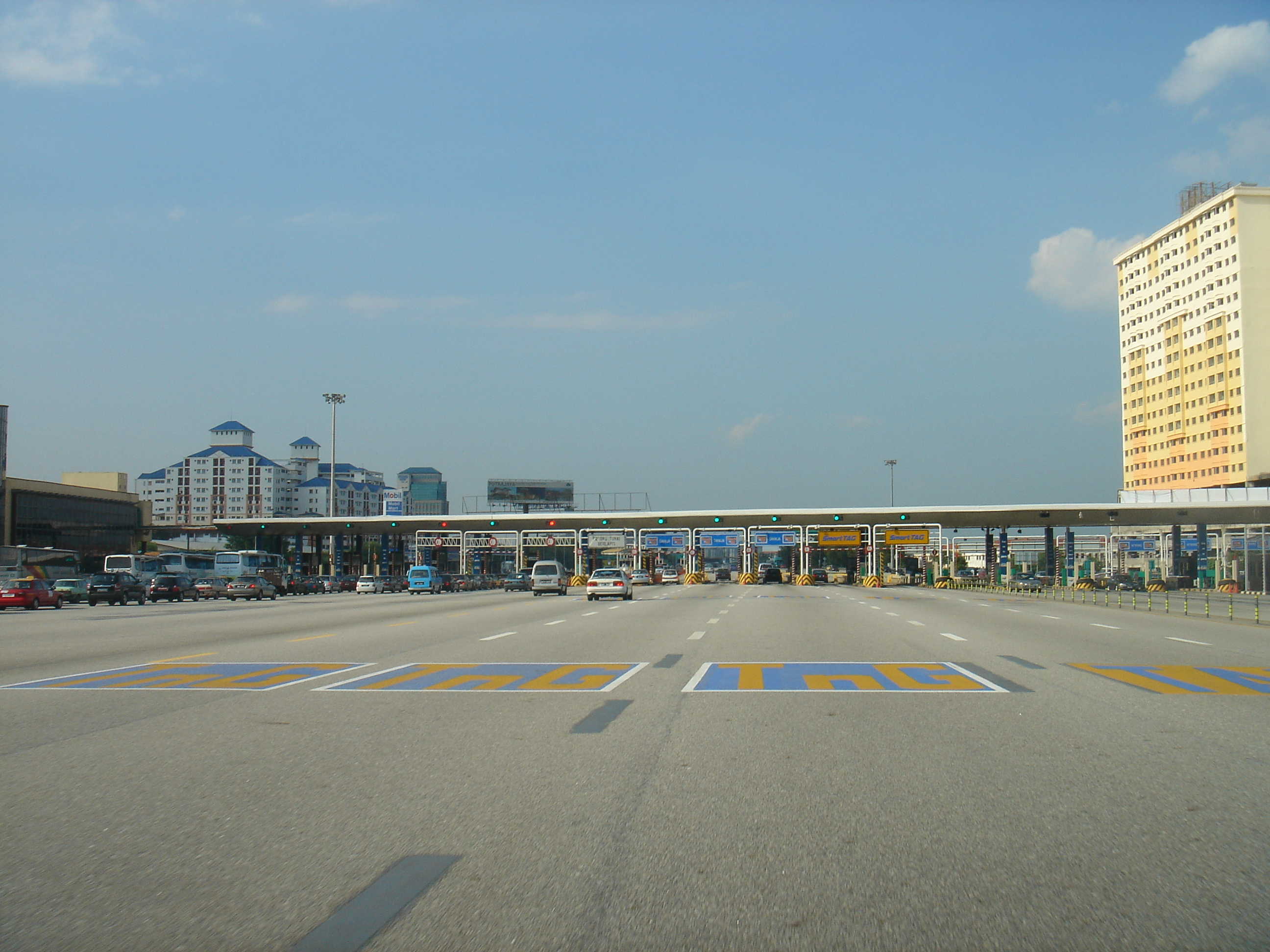
Specialised Touch 'n Go lanes are provided at toll plazas in Malaysian Highways.

=== Toll fare ===
Touch 'n Go can be used on entire highway stretches in Malaysia with the familiar TnG & TAG sign marked on the road. Two systems were introduced for toll fare collection instead of manual tickets. Due to highways with numerous junctions or intersections serving short-distance trips, most of Malaysia's highways use open system toll collection.

==== Toll fare collection on open system ====
Card users only have to touch the reader at Touch 'n Go lane counters or drive-through SmartTAG lanes at certain toll plazas. Toll fares charged are fixed regardless of the distance travelled.

==== Toll fare collection on closed system ====
Card users "touch in" before entering the expressway at respective toll plazas and "touch out" at the exit toll plaza. Vehicle with cards have to drive thru TnG lanes and TAG lanes for SmartTAG users. Toll fares are charged based on the distance between the entry plaza and the exit plaza. Card users have to make sure the amount balance is more than RM20 before entering the toll plaza. Those with less than RM20 are required to top it up either at the offices or at TAMBAH NILAI lanes, otherwise they are unable to enter the highway. Seven expressways have the feature; the most famous is the North–South Expressway.

==== SmartTAG ====
An extension of Touch 'n Go is the SmartTAG or TAG onboard unit, which allows users to insert the card into a reader device installed in the vehicle for fully automatic/non-stop payment at toll plazas. Payment is made automatically as the toll charge is deducted from the value stored in the Touch 'n Go card.

==== Electronic toll collection systems ====
There are three types of the electronic toll collection (ETC) systems, Touch 'n Go card unit, Smart TAG onboard unit and RFID tag. Touch 'n Go and Smart TAG have been made compulsory in all expressways since 1 July 2004, following the instruction of the Works Minister, Datuk Seri S. Samy Vellu. Other electronic payment systems that were previously used by other highway operators such as PLUS TAG for all PLUS expressways network, Express TAG for Shah Alam Expressway, FasTrak for Damansara–Puchong Expressway and Sprint Expressway and SagaTag in Cheras–Kajang Expressway, were abolished in a move to standardise the electronic payment method.

	Other expressway concessionaries		PLUS Expressways			
Electronic toll collection systems vs Payment method	Touch 'n Go SmartTAG	Touch 'n Go	Touch 'n Go SmartTAG	Touch 'n Go		PLUS RFiD
Electronic toll collection systems vs Payment method	Touch 'n Go SmartTAG	MyRFiD	Touch 'n Go SmartTAG	MyRFiD	VEP RFiD	PLUS RFiD
Touch 'n Go Card: Generic Card; Corporate Card; Auto-reload Card	✔		✔			
Touch 'n Go eWallet	✔ Toll fare will be deducted from eWallet balance via PayDirect	✔ Toll fare will be deducted from eWallet balance via PayDirect	X PayDirect not activated	✔ Toll fare will be deducted from eWallet balance via PayDirect	• VEP enforcement deferred until further notice	• will be extended to open and closed system nationwide after fully launch
Bank Card (Debit/Credit)						✔under pilot test on open system
Notes	Nationwide toll collection on open and closed system For PayDirect, if your eWallet are insufficient, your toll fares will be deducted from your Touch 'n Go Card balance.	RFID tag issuance by Touch 'n Go for Malaysian registered vehicle.	Nationwide toll collection on open and closed system	Nationwide toll collection on open and closed system	RFID tag issuance by Touch 'n Go for foreign registered vehicle currently available at Johor checkpoints.	RFID tag issuance by PLUS Expressways.

TNG card and TNG ewallet balances are non-transferable. Therefore, road user has to take a note.

=== Public transportation ===
Since 2002, Touch 'n Go has been chosen as the common cashless ticketing system for all rail and bus lines in Klang Valley, in parallel with co-branded Rapid KL's My Rapid card (abolished in 2017) and KTM's Komuterlink (not using Touch 'n Go fare collection system). For all Touch 'n Go logo printed cards, they are accepted at:

- KTM Komuter
  - 1 Batu Caves–Pulau Sebang Line
  - 2 Tanjung Malim–Port Klang Line
  - 10 KL Sentral–Terminal Skypark Line (route currently suspended)
- Rapid KL
  - 3 Ampang Line
  - 4 Sri Petaling Line
  - 5 Kelana Jaya Line
  - 8 KL Monorail
  - 9 Kajang Line
  - 11 Shah Alam Line
  - 12 Putrajaya Line
  - B1 BRT Sunway Line
- Express Rail Link
  - 6 KLIA Ekspres
  - 7 KLIA Transit

as well as all Rapid KL buses, Putrajaya Line and Kajang Line feeder buses. Touch 'n Go is also accepted in Rapid Kuantan buses in Pahang, Perak Transit myBas Ipoh in Perak, and Panorama Melaka buses in Malacca.

== Touch 'n Go eWallet ==
Touch 'n Go eWallet is an integrated mobile app to use the Touch ‘n Go generic card. It allows users to add the Touch 'n Go generic card number to more easily track their transactions. The usage balance in the eWallet is not interchangeable to the physical card and vice versa. However, the eWallet balance can be used if linked to the physical card to activate the PayDirect payment mechanism.

Functions available with the app for easier daily usage:

- Pay for movie tickets, concerts, and events
- Easier transfer money between TnG eWallet
- Top up eWallet for toll usage
- Purchase of flight tickets
- Retail purchase with attached merchants
- Drive through tolls using money from the eWallet

List of highways that accept PayDirect payment method:

- Senai Desaru Expressway (SDE)
- Ampang - Kuala Lumpur Elevated Highway (AKLEH)
- Besraya Expressway (BESRAYA)
- Bangunan Sultan Iskandar (BSI)
- Duta - Ulu Kelang Expressway (DUKE)
- Guthrie Corridor Expressway (GCE)
- Cheras - Kajang Expressway (GRANDSAGA)
- New North Klang Straits Bypass (GRANDSEPADU)
- Sultan Abdul Halim Mu'adzam Shah Bridge (JKSB)
- Shah Alam Expressway (KESAS)
- Kuala Lumpur - Karak Highway (KLK)
- Kuala Lumpur - Kuala Selangor Expressway (LATAR)
- Damansara - Puchong Expressway (LDP)
- Kemuning - Shah Alam Highway (LKSA)
- Lingkaran Luar Butterworth (LLB)
- Maju Expressway (MEX)
- New Pantai Expressway (NPE)
- Kajang Dispersal Link Expressway (SILK)
- Stormwater Management and Road Tunnel (SMART)
- Sistem Penyuraian Trafik KL Barat (SPRINT)

== Criticisms ==
- Add value/reload charge

Free reload is only available as a manual transaction over the counters of Touch 'n Go Hub, Highway Operation Office and selected highway toll lanes, major stations of Rapid KL and KTM Komuter. Reloading through ATM and reload agents incurs an additional fee of RM0.50 and RM1.00 at Cash Deposit machines. RM2.00 is charged for Zingcard autoreload for every RM100.

- Cheque refund

Refunds for card balance and deposit are paid by cheque within one month and sent by post by Rangkaian Segar Sdn Bhd.

- No usage discount

Concessionary users are charged between 2.0 – 2.5 percent of the profit for using the system. No discount is given, but instead card users may have to pay the commission fee. Car park operators usually pass on the Touch 'n Go commission fee onto card users, resulting in users paying 10% more.

- Rebates program

Effective 5 Oct 2009, users can claim a rebate if their usage exceeds 80 tolled transactions per month. The rebate amounts to 20% of total usage and is given in points credited to the card, not cash. It only can be claimed at the Touch 'n Go counters at the toll offices.

- Effectiveness argued

Although the system was introduced in the last 20 years with the support of the government (particularly by incorporation the system into MyKad), card and concessionary users still prefer to use cash. According to a Bank Negara report on the Payment System Act 2003, 39% of non-cash transactions in Malaysia were paid with Touch 'n Go. Non-cash payment via Touch 'n Go (and SmartTAG) accounted for 35% of all toll payments nationwide and 50% in the Klang Valley. However, to date, Touch 'n Go claims their ten years of research and development has resulted in four million card users (in a population of 20 million) and use by all 19 toll concession companies in operation in Malaysia.

- E-statement

All transaction records within three days of the date cannot be viewed through the e-Statement. Fax transactions recorded by phone are however available within 24 hours and mostly dependent on the data server system. There is now a site to view transactions for up to ninety days at MYTouchnGo Portal.

- Limited CTS fare structure

The fare structure is only applicable for adults. The cards are not available for senior citizens, children, students or the handicapped; however, since 2017 RapidKL has introduced Touch 'n Go concession cards for its services, replacing the previous myrapid-based cards.

- KLIA check-in

Touch 'n Go card users can no longer access the airline check-in counters at KL Sentral using their Touch 'n Go card as of June 2015. The Touch 'n Go card can still be used (RM55 each way) to board the KLIA Express itself, but travellers will need to check-in at KLIA instead.

- Reload via eWallet

Despite being introduced for some time, users still need to find reload centers in order to reload their cards. The card balance is not the same with TnG eWallet and not all payment points offer PayDirect features, especially for parking.

- Lack of NFC for Visa cards

After the introduction of the NFC card, Touch n' Go launched their very own prepaid Visa debit cards. The cards received wide criticisms as they were unable to be used to make payments at Touch n' Go terminals, particularly in parking areas. The reason for the Touch N Go feature omission was due to earlier testing showing that there were interference issues when there was both Visa PayWave and Touch N Go functions.

- Flexibility payment for toll fares

Non-interchangeable toll fares between TnG card with ewallet system (RFID). RFID requires dedicated lanes for the closed toll system, which is different from the open toll system whereby user will be charge once at the entrance at tollgate. On the close toll system, road user require entry & exit at the same RFID dedicated lanes. Otherwise, toll fare collection will be error and the users will be charged a penalty. Due to RFiD transponder does not install on all toll gate, road user have to make sure they are using the right lanes. For hybrid toll gate TnG+RFiD or SmartTAG+RFiD, priority will be taken by RFiD system if road user have RFiD sticker installed at their car. On 15 January 2022, fully migration on all PLUS highway had caused massive traffic jam due to detection issues, wrong lanes by user, low ewallet balance, total conversion on SmartTAG lane into only RFiD lanes also had cause TNG lanes becomes a massive congestion.

== See also ==
- List of smart cards
- Multi-Lane Free Flow in Malaysia (MLFF)
- Malaysian Expressway System
