= MyRapid Card =

Smart card for payment on Kuala Lumpur public transport

My Rapid Touch 'n Go
- Location: Malaysia
- Launched: July 2011
- Technology: Contactless smart card My Rapid - MIFARE Plus My Rapid Touch 'n Go - MIFARE Classic
- Operator: Rapid Rail Sdn Bhd & Rapid Bus Sdn Bhd
- Manager: Prasarana Malaysia Berhad
- Currency: MYR
- Stored-value: Pay as you go
- Credit expiry: 10 years
- Validity: Rapid KL trains on MRT, LRT and monorail; All Rapid KL buses including BRT
- Retailed: MRT, LRT and monorail stations; BRT stations
- Website: My Rapid Card

The My Rapid Touch 'n Go is a contactless smart card used for the payment of public transportation fares of Rapid KL services in Malaysia, with limited use in the parking payments for Rapid KL Park N Ride facilities.

Introduced in July 2011, it is extended to 3 4 LRT Sri Petaling Line and 5 LRT Kelana Jaya Line in November 2011 as well as 8 Monorail Line in February 2012. Rapid Kuantan buses in Pahang adopted the MyRapid card in 2015.

== Abolition ==
The My Rapid card was initially planned to be also accepted on the 9 MRT Sungai Buloh-Kajang Line once the Semantan-Kajang stretch opens. According to an announcement by Prasarana, the My Rapid card will instead be phased out and replaced with the co-branded My Rapid Touch 'n Go cards beginning 15 June 2017. The existing My Rapid cards will no longer be valid effective 16 July 2017, the day before the Semantan-Kajang MRT line is scheduled to commence operations. Existing My Rapid-based concession cards for students, disabled persons and senior citizens will also be replaced with the My Rapid Touch 'n Go-based cards.

My Rapid Touch 'n Go cards are sold, distributed and managed by Prasarana Malaysia Berhad.
