= SmartTAG =

Malaysian toll collection system

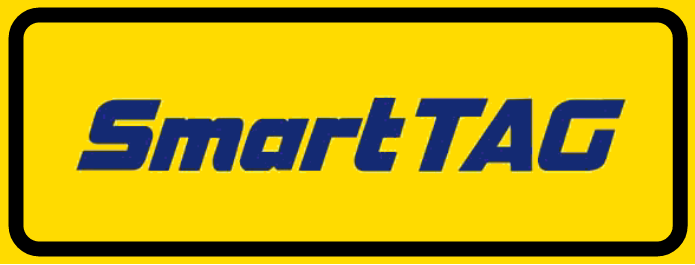
SmartTAG

SmartTAG (acronym in Malay for Sistem Membayar Automatik Rangkaian Tol or "Toll Network Automatic Payment Systems") is an on-board unit (OBU) vehicle-based device used as an electronic toll collection (ETC) system over long distances (maximum 15 metres) to complement Touch 'n Go, a card-based system. It was first introduced in Malaysia in 1999 and is also used as an Entrance Access Security.

== Features ==
SmartTAG was designed, developed and manufactured by Teras Teknologi Sdn Bhd as an extension of the Touch 'n Go system, initially as a replacement of PLUS TAG. It is being marketed by Touch 'n Go Sdn Bhd (formerly Rangkaian Segar Sdn Bhd).

The intellectual property rights to the SmartTAG belongs to an Austrian company known as EFKON Gmbh. The president of EFKON, Dr Helmut Rieder, was the one who set up a joint venture with UEM to form Infrared Advance Technology Sdn Bhd (IRAT).

The SmartTAG is currently priced at RM130 per unit inclusive of free Touch 'n Go card with RM10 reload value. This is a subsidised price as UEM has to pay royalty to EFKON for each SmartTag assembled by IRAT.

Built on a non-stop Electronic Toll Collection (ETC) philosophy, SmartTAG incorporated infra-red communication that communicated with infra-red transceivers mounted at the ceilings of toll plazas to allow vehicle drivers to drive through SmartTAG dedicated lanes and pay toll without stopping. It is designed to process up to 1,200 vehicles per hour.

== History ==
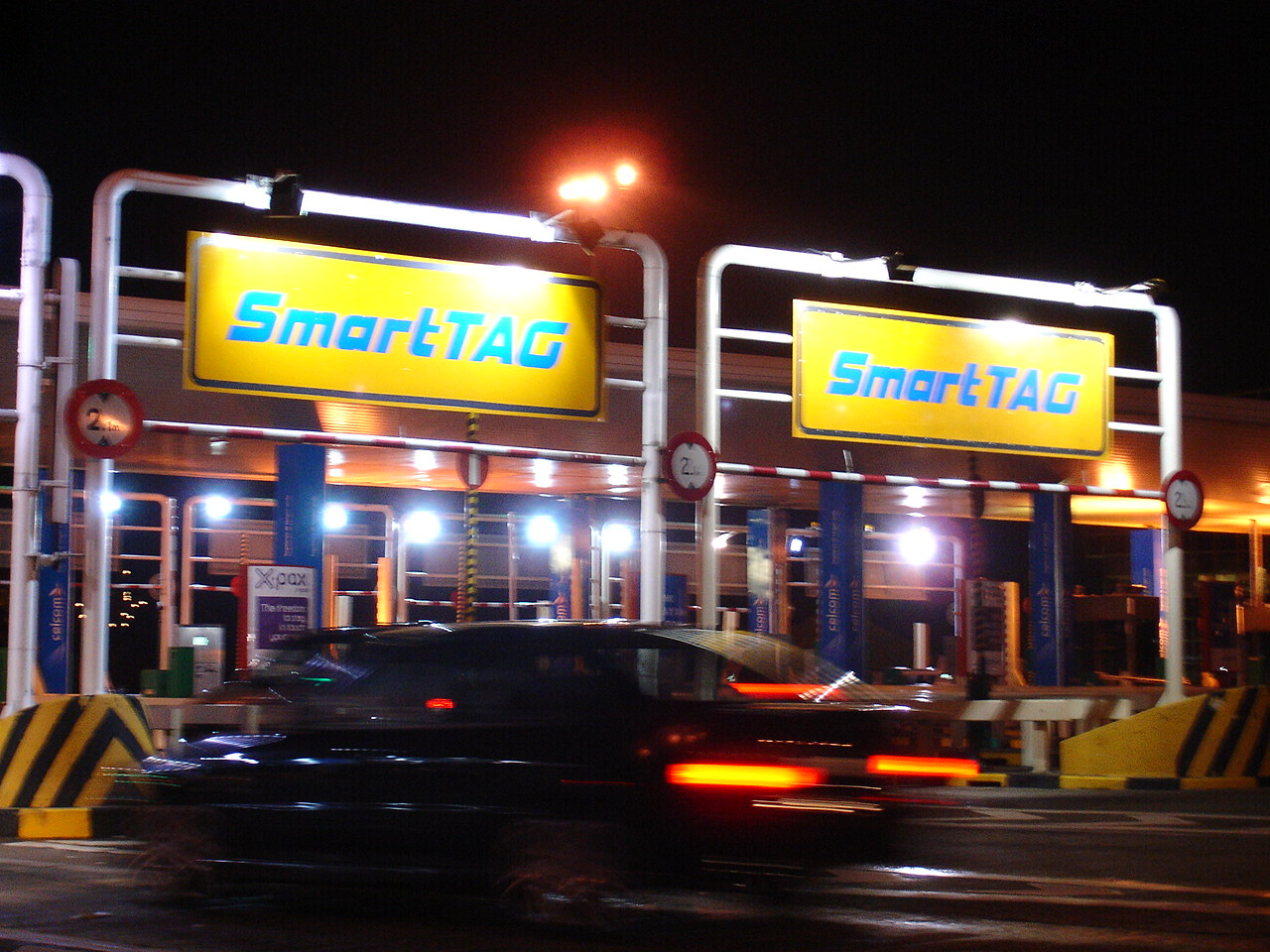
A typical entrance of SmartTAG lanes on Malaysian expressways.

Prior to the introduction of SmartTAG, several different types of non-stop ETC were already being used in Malaysia:

- PLUS TAG for all PLUS (Projek Lebuhraya Utara Selatan) expressways in Klang Valley 1994–1999
- Express TAG for Shah Alam Expressway 1996–2004
- FasTrak for Damansara–Puchong Expressway and Sprint Expressway 1999–2004
- Saga Tag for Cheras–Kajang Expressway 1999–2004

SmartTAG was officially launched on 15 March 1999, phasing out PLUS TAG at over 20 plazas of Projek Lebuhraya Utara-Selatan (PLUS) / North–South Expressway.

In December 2003, Minister of Works, Datuk Seri S Samy Vellu directed the implementation of a single ETC nationwide as a form of standardisation and convenience of use for road users. The directive requires all major toll operators in Malaysia to have a minimum of 2 Touch 'n Go and 1 SmartTAG lanes per direction at every plaza. The directive was gradually implemented by all major toll operators on 1 July 2004 and marked the cessation of other types of non-stop ETCs in Malaysia.

In 2004, SmartTAG expanded as entrance access security for residential areas. It was first (currently only) deployed at Ledang Heights Bungalow Park, in Iskandar Puteri, Johor.

On 8 August 2018, Touch 'n Go discontinued the sales of SmartTAG in favor of RFID-based Touch 'n Go eWallet which started its testing phase on the following month. However, LokaTAG, another authorized aftermarket SmartTAG manufacturer will provide an alternative device that will serves as drop-in replacement for SmartTAG. Unlike SmartTAG, it does not run on battery as it is powered from automobile auxiliary power outlet instead.

== Usage of SmartTAG ==
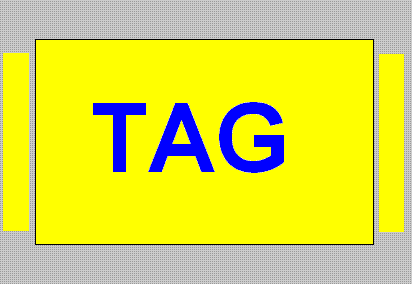
SmartTAG marker on road

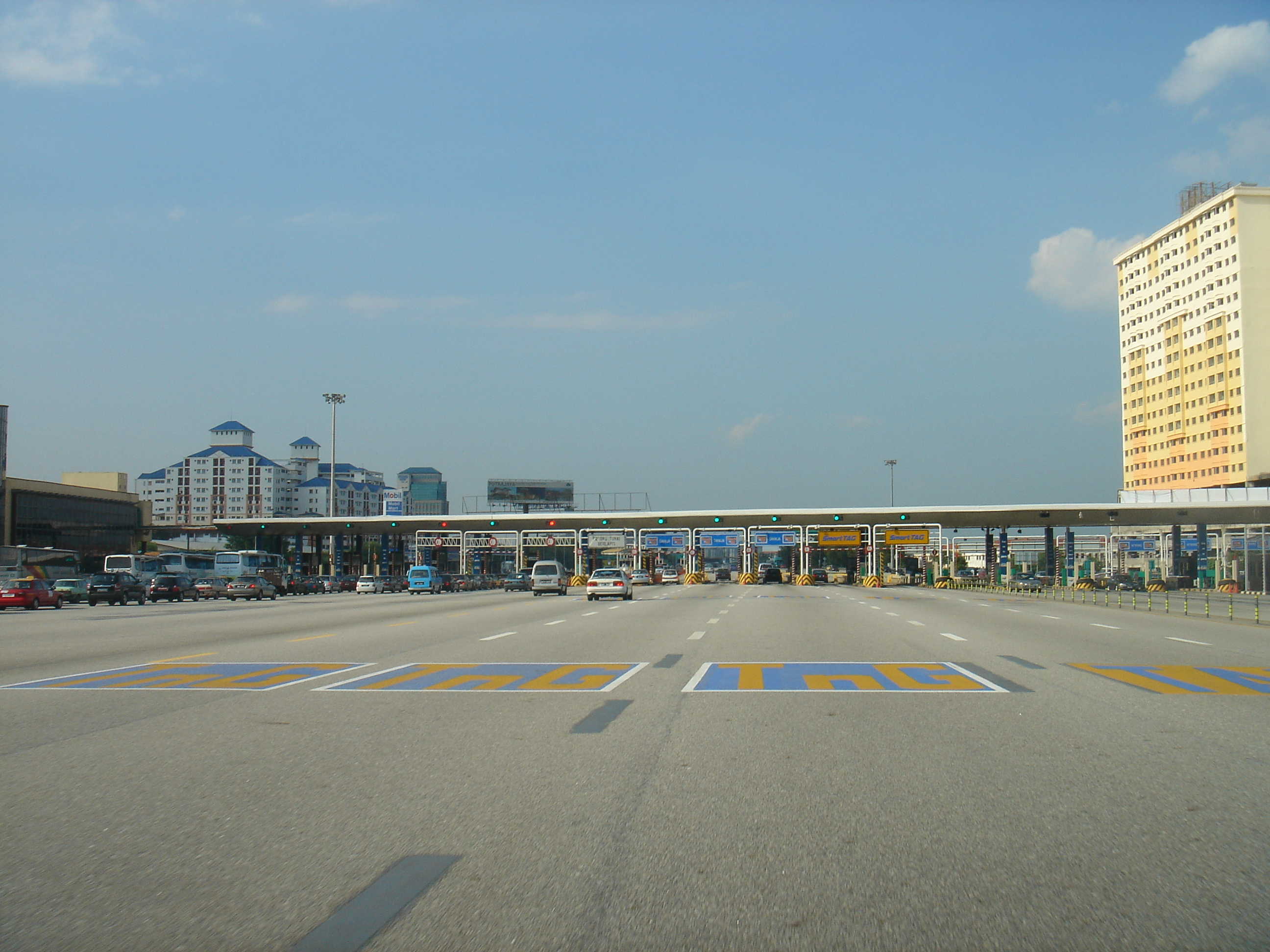
Specialised SmartTAG lanes are provided at major exit/entry toll plazas.

=== EPS Coverage ===
SmartTAG lanes are available at most expressway toll plazas.

=== Entrance access security ===
To diversify the usages of SmartTAG and to attract further subscription of SmartTAG, Teras Teknologi with co-operation from Nusajaya Land Sdn Bhd, developer of Iskandar Puteri implemented a secure Entrance Access Security for Ledang Heights Bungalow Park.

Touted as the Beverly Hills of Johor, Ledang Heights consists of 571 bungalow lots situated off the expressway to Singapore, Second Link Expressway (LINKEDUA) and within six kilometres from the Sultan Abu Bakar Customs, Immigration and Quarantine Complex.

SmartTAG offer both security and convenience. Security is provided by two layers of electronic recognition required to access the perimeter; a SmartTAG unit and an assigned smartcard registered to the security department. These units have to be detected simultaneously on authorised vehicles to gain entry into Ledang Heights. SmartTAG and card assigned can also be used in all highways that adopt SmartTAG as an EPS.

Plans are underway for further adaptations of SmartTAG in other prestigious housing developments.

== See also ==
- Multi-lane free flow in Malaysia (MLFF)
- Malaysian Expressway System
- Electronic toll collection
- Teras Teknologi
