= Teras Teknologi =

Malaysian corporation

Teras Teknologi Sdn Bhd
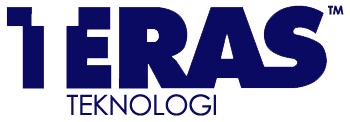
- Type: Private Limited Company
- Industry: Technology
- Founded: September 1994
- Headquarters: Persada PLUS, Subang Interchange, New Klang Valley Expressway, Petaling Jaya, Selangor, Malaysia
- Area served: Technology services in: Malaysia; Philippines; India; Indonesia
- Key people: YBhg Datuk Azman Ismail, Chairman Zakaria Ahmad Zabidi, Director; Chai Yoke Fong, Director Shamsul Izhan Abdul Majid, Chief Executive Officer (CEO) Ir. Azman Masbah, Chief Technology Officer
- Products: Electronic Toll Collection; Traffic Control; Access Control
- Revenue: ▲USD17 million (FY2008)
- Number of employees: 140
- Parent: PLUS Expressways
- Website: www.teras.com.my

Teras Teknologi Sdn Bhd (TERAS), a subsidiary of PLUS Malaysia Berhad (PMB), is a Malaysian global corporation based in Petaling Jaya.

TERAS is the creator, developer, and leading system integrator of Touch 'n Go and SmartTAG in multiple platform technology widely used throughout Malaysia as highway, parking and public transportation payments, and access control system by over 6 million users (in June 2009).

With 1,800 toll lanes committed to date, TERAS is the leading provider of Electronic Toll Collection system in South East Asia and control over 70% market share in Malaysia. TERAS now diversified its technology capabilities into transportation and property market.

== History ==
=== 1994–1997: Founding ===
TERAS was formed on 15 September 1994 by Renong Berhad to address the urgent needs of providing cost-effective, reliable and locally supported Electronic Toll Collection (ETC) as the outcome of Malaysia's large-scale program of public enterprises privatization outlined in Privatization Masterplan (PMP) in 1991. The program had enabled the imposition of tolls on roads previously built by the Public Works Ministry or the Malaysian Highway Authority (Lembaga Lebuhraya Malaysia, or LLM).

TERAS was just an ordinary Electronic Data Processing (EDP) unit to PLUS.

Following the incorporation of Nirwana Frame Sdn Bhd in 1995 (subsidiary of Time Automation and Management Services Sdn Bhd), the company which was instrumental in setting up the R&D on the Toll Systems. This in turn, attract the Teras Teknologi Sdn Bhd to bought the company and named it to Teras Control Systems Sdn Bhd.

In 1996, TERAS created its own internally developed applications named TERAS Revenue and Collections System (TRACS) which was instantly deployed for Penang Bridge, North–South Expressway Central Link (ELITE) and North–South Expressway (NSE/PLUS Expressways) nationwide highway network of over 800 lanes.

By 18 March 1997, TRACS was enhanced again by Saiful Khairi and his team with the introduction of Touch 'n Go (pre-paid smart card electronic payment system) at Jalan Pahang Toll Plaza.

TERAS first international as ETC supplier and integrator for Manila–Cavite Expressway, Philippines.

=== 1998–1999: Expansion ===
The period sees TERAS expanded its core businesses and technology diversification in two major areas; ETC and general Information and Communications Technology (ICT) projects.

In term of corporate ownership, the highlight was divestment by Renong Berhad of its 70% equity stake in TERAS to UEM Group for RM11.3 million cash (US$5 million equivalent at that time) in June 1999.

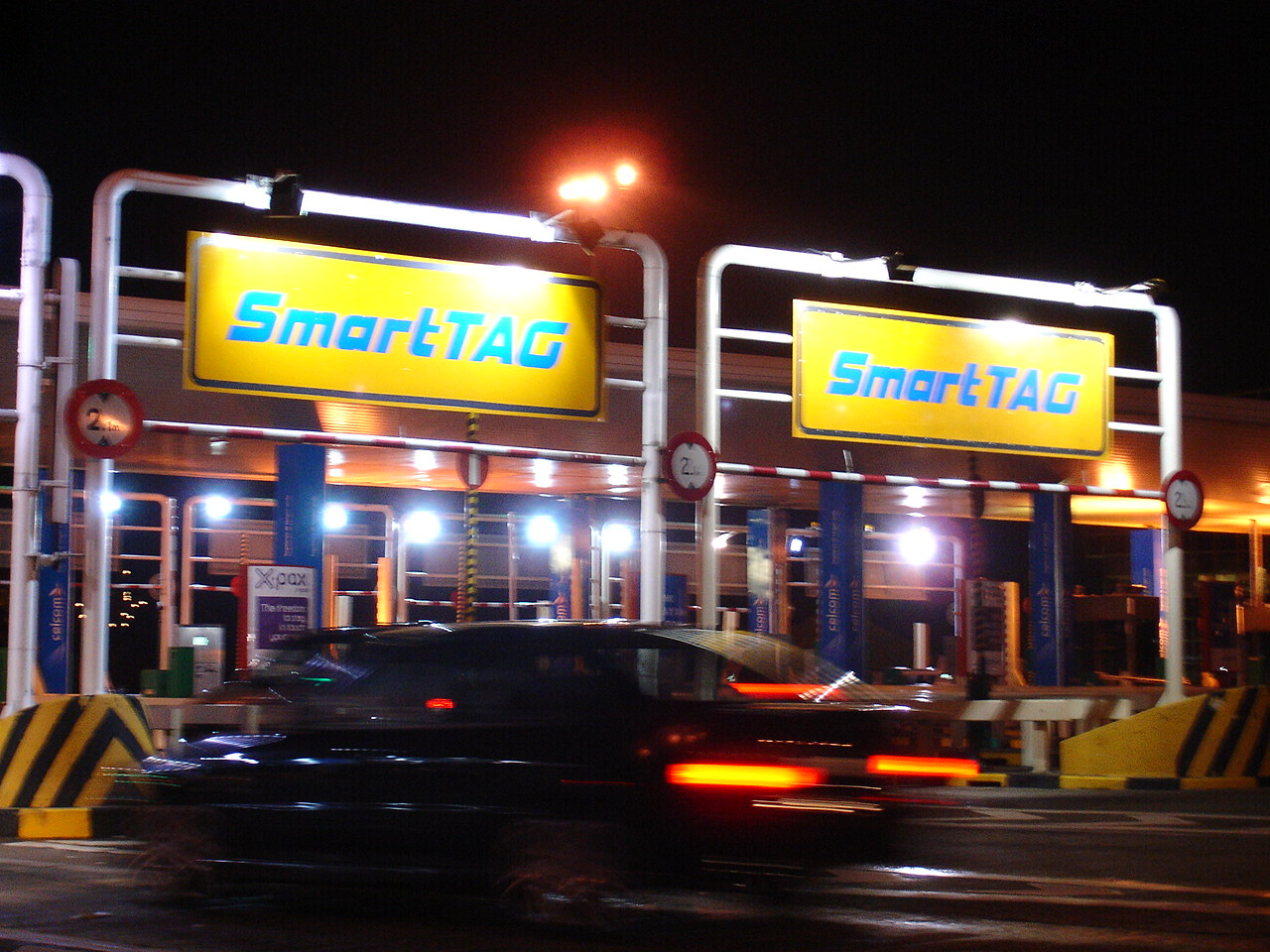
A typical entrance of SmartTAG lanes developed and installed by TERAS on Malaysian expressways.

In ETC area, TERAS upgraded TRACS through the development of SmartTAG (a non-stop electronic toll collection) and completed its national implementation by 15 March 1999 (replacing PLUS TAG) at 20 toll plazas of North–South Expressway (NSE/PLUS Expressways).

Built on a non-stop ETC philosophy, TERAS incorporated SmartTAG infra-red communication, a proprietary technology control by an Austrian company; EFKON Gmnbh that communicated with infra-red transceivers mounted at the ceilings of toll plazas to allow vehicle drivers to drive through SmartTAG dedicated lanes and pay toll without stopping. It is designed to process up to 1,200 vehicles per hour.

In general ICT projects, TERAS has bid and won contracts to supply total network environments and IT requirements for the Commonwealth Village in Bukit Jalil, in conjunction with the Commonwealth Games hosted by Malaysia in 1998. At the same year, TERAS was also contracted to design, build and equip TIMEdotCom data center in Glenmarie, Shah Alam.

As deterrence for Year 2000 problem (Y2K), TERAS was engaged by nine companies under UEM Group to ensure readiness, through creation of internal operations plans continuity in the event of possible technical glitches caused by the Y2K bug.

For financial year 1999, TERAS revenues breached US$20 million mark with over 140 employees employed. The year also marked the appointment of Akbar Ahmad as the new managing director of TERAS.

=== 2000–2004: Stagnation ===
Early 2000 global recession gave significant impact to TERAS businesses and translated to negative business growth that lasted until mid-2004.

The negative business growth was attributed by the deferment of further ETC upgrading works at existing highways and of new highway projects in Malaysia and regionally. TERAS was further affected with cost-cutting measure implemented by most organisation where ICT projects were put as low priority.

As counter-measure strategy, TERAS deployed TRACS to other market usages, first as parking automation solution capitalising on Touch 'n Go platform in 2001. Following that, TERAS Automated Parking System (TAPS) was created and breakthrough was achieved with the first installation of 12 parking sites for Lien Hoe Group. It has grown to over 30 sites within the next 2 years.

In 2002, TRACS technology platform was also deployed to door access system for TIME Engineering, UEM Group, UEM Land, Macroworks, Tenaga Nasional Berhad (TNB) and various other companies; totalling over 100 operational access doors.

These measures enabled TERAS to remain profitable throughout this time-line even with negative business growth.

=== 2005–2008: Rebound ===
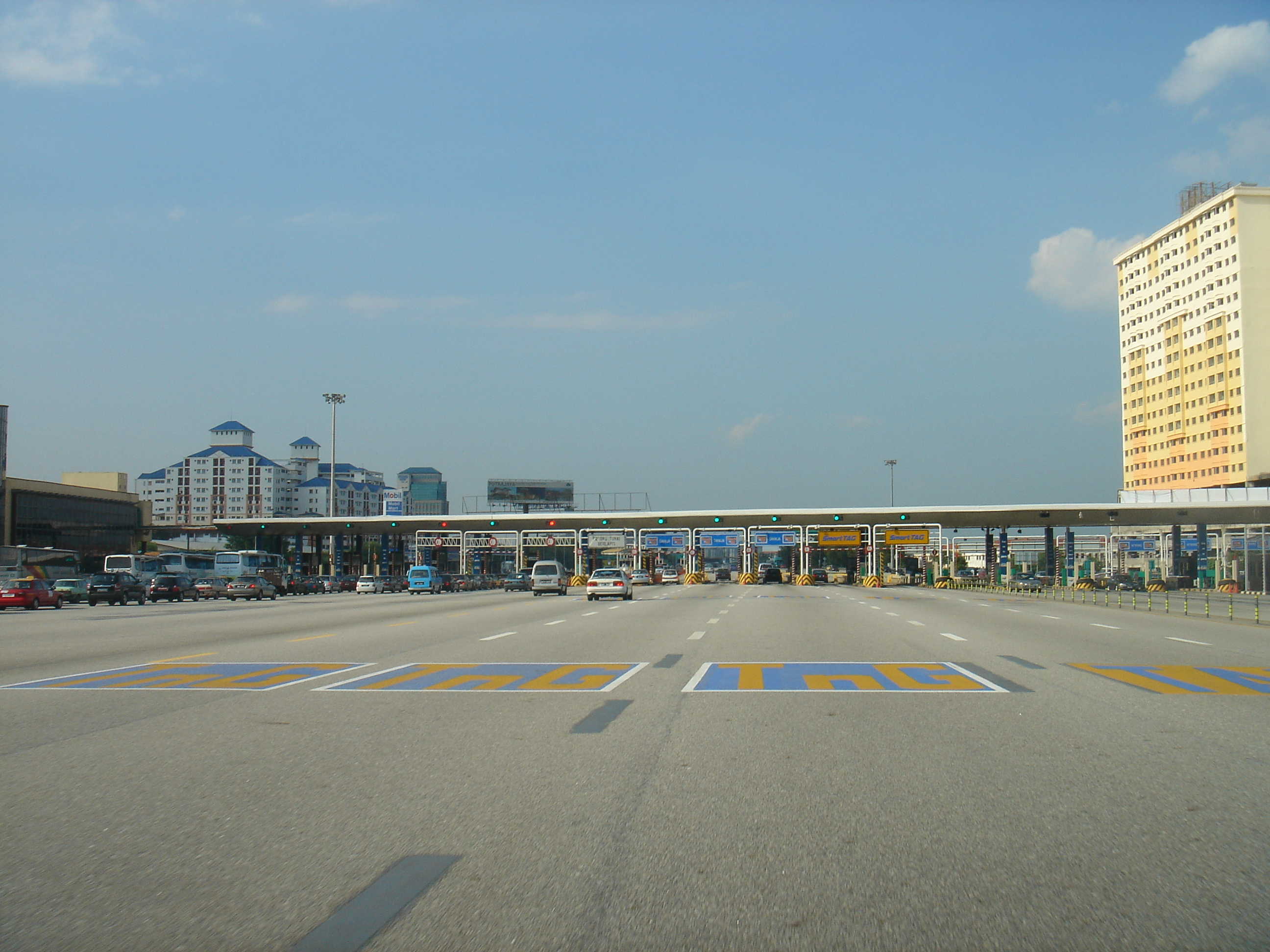
Configuration of typical electronic toll collection system at toll plazas as provided by TERAS in Malaysian Highways.

The Malaysia's economy pick-up during the period has benefited TERAS with an average of 20% annual business growth.

The Minister of Works, Samy Vellu directive of compulsory minimum 2 Touch 'n Go lanes and 1 SmartTAG lane at all existing and new toll plazas to facilitate highway users ease of travel has positioned TERAS at a higher value.

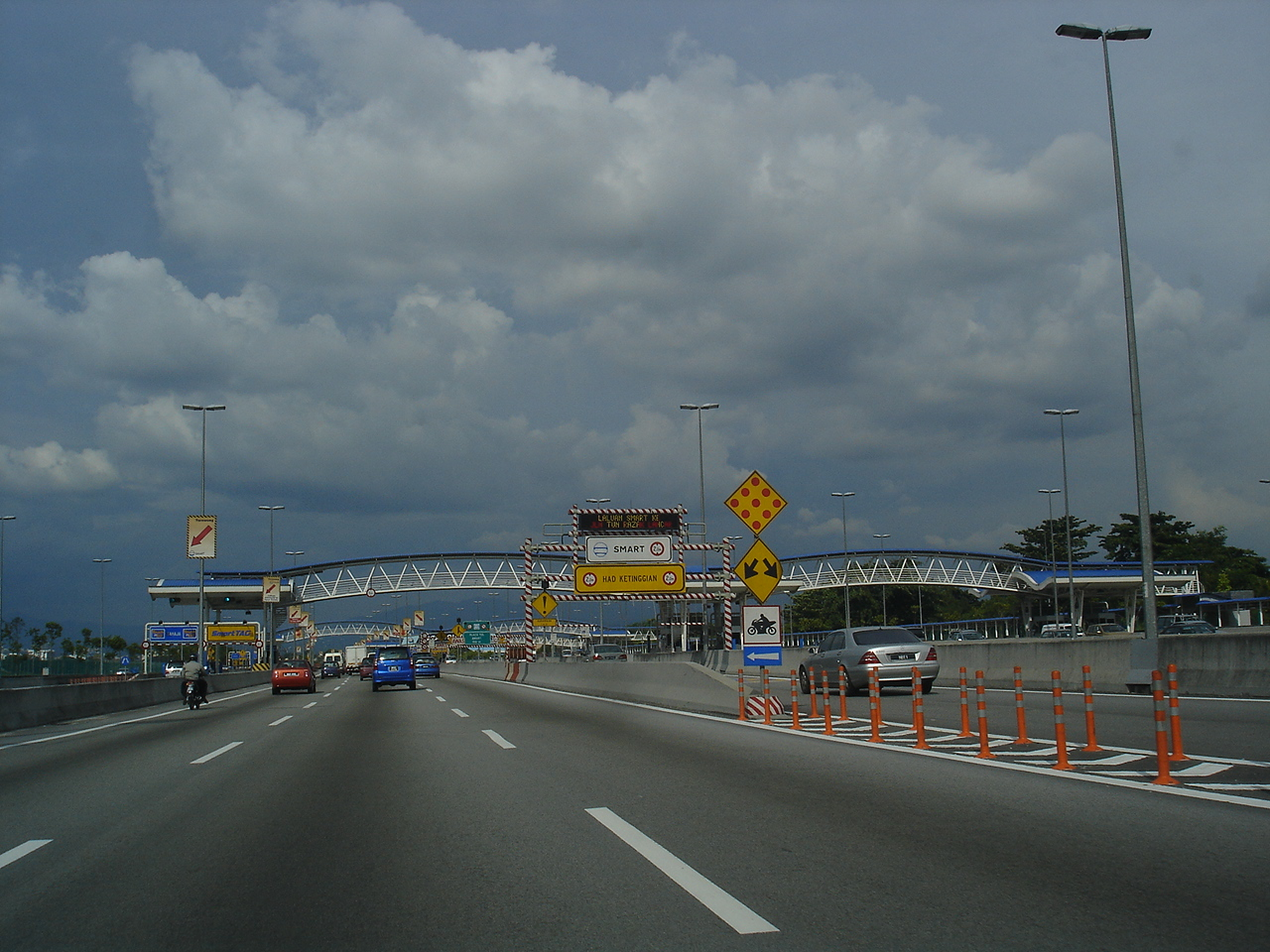
The north bound entrance of SMART Tunnel on the Kuala Lumpur–Seremban Expressway

Previously deferred highway construction projects also began in earnest. New Pantai Expressway (NPE), Maju Expressway (MEX), Stormwater Management and Road Tunnel (SMART), Duta–Ulu Klang Expressway (DUKE) and Butterworth Outer Ring Road (BORR) resumed and placed their ETC installation orders with TERAS whilst NSE called for third-lanes widening projects, toll plazas relocation and lanes upgrade, further contributed positively to TERAS.

With the realisation of the need to ensure sustainable growth, TERAS consolidated its business activities into three major segments; Transportation, Property and eBusiness.

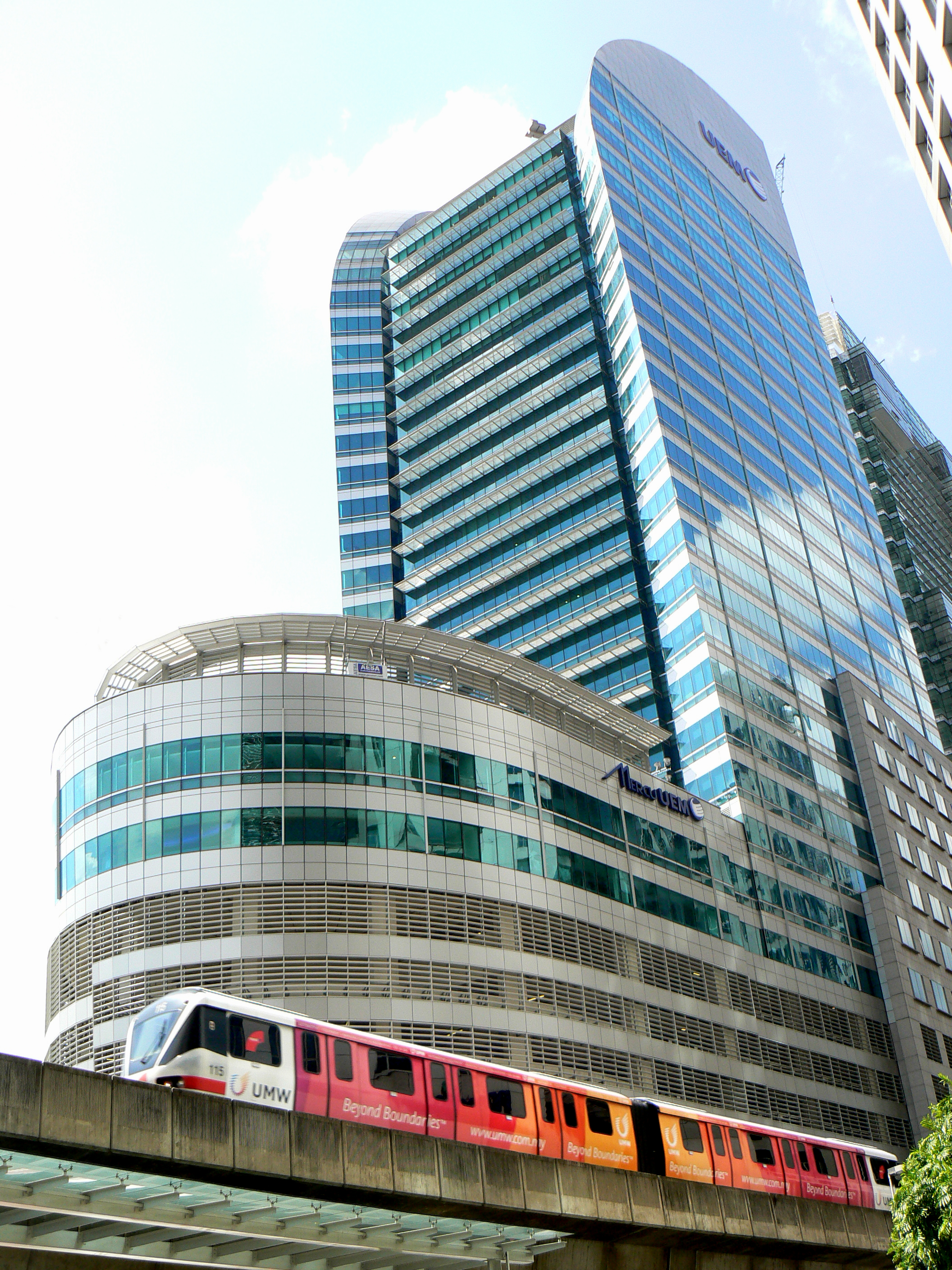
Mercu UEM utilising TERAS' technology adapted from toll i.e.: SmartTAG parking and Touch 'n Go access security and attendance

TERAS first foray into property segment technology development was the implementation of resident/visitor integrated manual; Touch n' Go and SmartTAG access with security surveillance at Ledang Heights housing development, Nusajaya in 2005.

The property business segment secured a major US$2.2 million project of Integrated Building Management System with integration of Audio-visual, parking, security access, visitor management and facilities command center of 29-storey commercial office building at KL Sentral Business District, Kuala Lumpur in 2008.

Expanding out from ETC in transportation market, TERAS began development in Traffic Control and Surveillance System (TCSS) and scored major contract worth US$2.7 million with NSE for the setup of NSE Nationwide Traffic Monitoring Center (TMC) at Persada PLUS in 2008.

International market penetration was marked by TERAS completed the delivery and installation of ETC works for Bhiwandi–Kalyan–Shil Phata Road in India worth US$1.4 million in 2008. Similar planned project in Sri Lanka was however shelved.

By end 2008, TERAS effectively controlled 71% of ETC market share in Malaysia with over 1,200 cash highway lanes, 418 Touch 'n Go lanes, 198 SmartTAG lanes, 90 parking lanes, over 300 access control doors and 1,500 surveillance cameras installed

For the period of 1994–2008, TERAS has delivered a total contract worth US$160 million in 4 countries.

For financial year 2008 (audited in March 2009), TERAS recorded US$17 million revenue realised from US$36 million book order achieved.

== Present ==
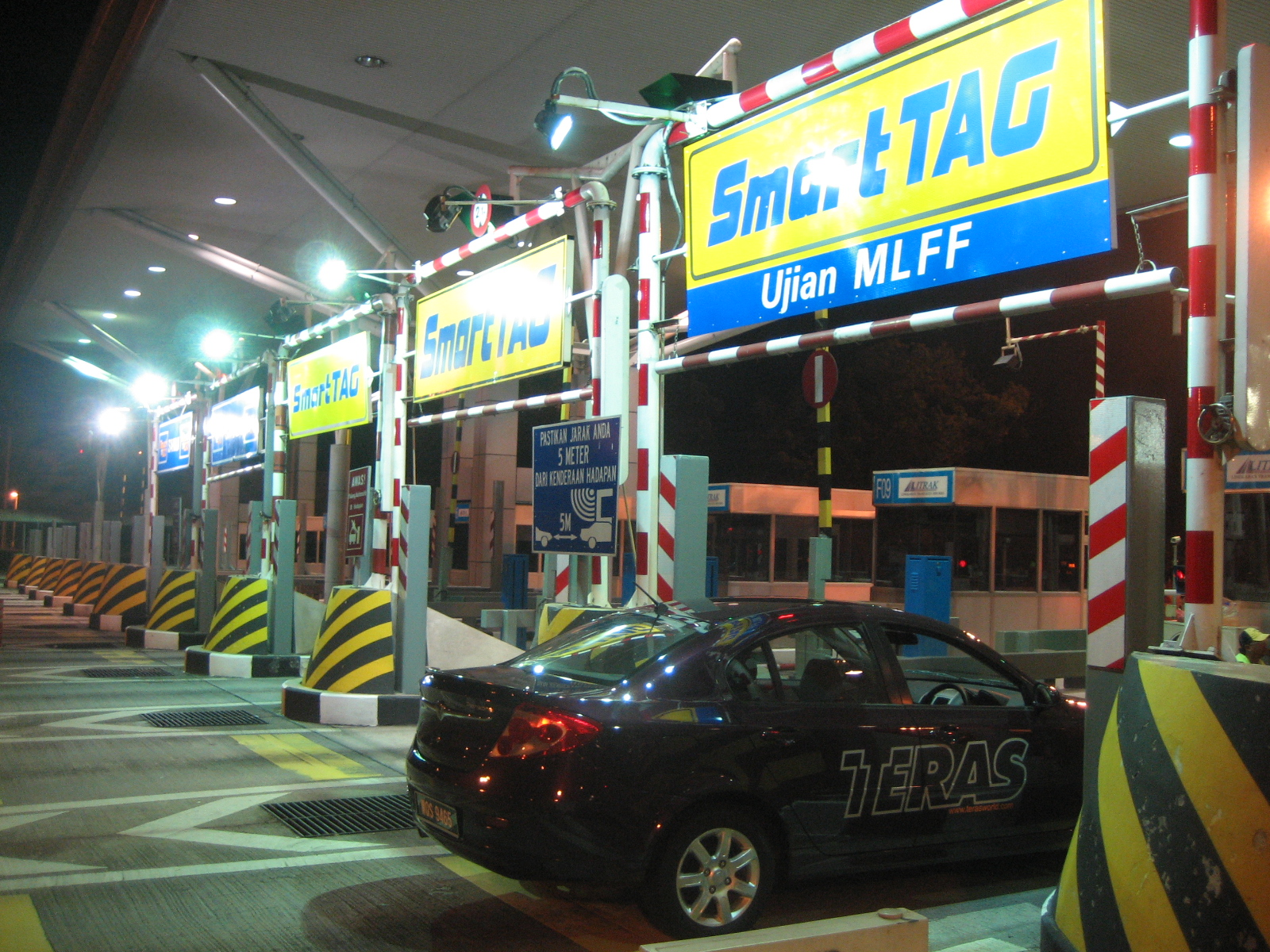
MLFF Trial at Penchala Toll Plaza

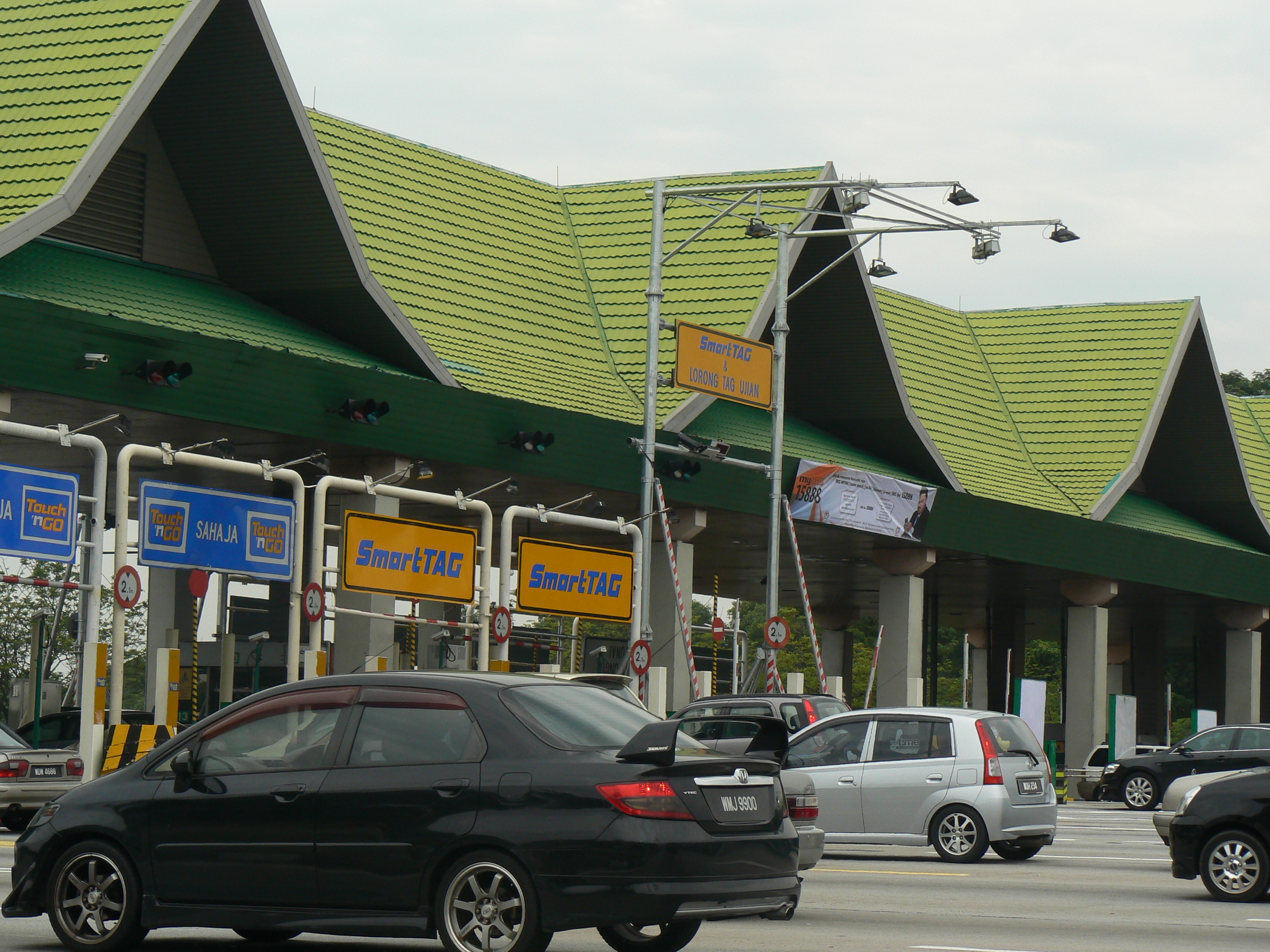
MLFF Trial at Batu Tiga Toll Plaza

TERAS has worked with Kemuning–Shah Alam Highway (LKSA), Kuala Lumpur–Kuala Selangor Expressway (KLS) and South Klang Valley Expressway (SKVE) who contracted ETC projects to TERAS worth US$2.5 million, US$3.2 million and US$1.3 million respectively. LKSA is scheduled for traffic operation by 18 May 2010, KLS by third quarter 2010 and SKVE by first quarter 2011.

TERAS was also engaged and instructed by the Malaysian Highway Authority (MHA) to conduct a technology study for the implementation of Multi Lane Free Flow (MLFF) at the North–South Expressway with 1,000 test users at Batu Tiga Plaza and 100 test users at the Damansara–Puchong Expressway Penchala Toll Plaza. The study was scheduled and completed in December 2009; it aimed at ascertaining the feasibility of such technology for use in Malaysia in terms of users' acceptance, issues that might arise and cost benefits. Upon a successful system study, MHA plans to implement MLFF as Malaysia's next-generation ETC with gradual nationwide implementation starting from June 2011 and completed by 2016.

Internationally, TERAS is now in the final stage of negotiation for implementation of ETC in Indonesia for Cikampek–Palimanan Toll Road and Cimmangis–Cibitung Toll Road. The projects are scheduled for completion by 2011 and 2012 respectively. Both said projects will conservatively add over US$10 million to TERAS balance sheet.

== Evaluation ==
TERAS was commented for using proprietary technology control by EFKON as a single sourced party in its development of SmartTAG in 1998. The SmartTAG on board unit which is priced at RM100 per unit with compulsory purchase of Touch 'n Go reload amount of RM100, is heavily subsidised by the highway concessions to pay royalty to EFKON for each SmartTAG assembled by IRAT.

Further, it was speculated that SmartTAG infra-red technology will not be able to handle the requirement for Multi Lane Free Flow (MLFF). It is expected that the microwave 5.8 GHz transponder systems which are undergoing testing under instruction by Malaysian Highway Authority (MHA) to TERAS will be the replacement of SmartTAG. Final decision on the matter will be decided by the Malaysian Cabinet scheduled by mid-2010.

TERAS also being taken to task for its revenue dependencies on UEM Group of companies which contributed to 60% of its total revenues (50% from PLUS alone as the biggest highway concessions in Malaysia). Thus, the restructuring of the company on-going to further broaden its revenue stream.

To date, 18 of 25 Malaysia's highways concessions deployed 100% of its technology requirements from TERAS of which the balance 7 use at the minimum of 30%.

== Operations ==
Effective November 2008, the company's operations are categorised into 3 "Business Segments":

- TRANSPORTATION
  - Electronic Toll Collection (ETC)
  - Automated Parking System
  - Integrated Ticketing System (ITS)
  - Bus Ticketing System (BTS)
- PROPERTY
  - Access Control System (Commercial Building and Residential)
  - Surveillance and Control System
  - Tracking System
- eBUSINESS
  - Network Infrastructure
  - Computer software development
  - Application Service Provider
  - Internet data center
  - Strategic IT Outsourcing

== Awards ==
- Winner of Malaysia-Canada Business Excellence Award 2008 in Science and Technology category.
- Winner of Golden Bull Award 2008 as SME's Most Outstanding Company.
- Merit in MSC-APICTA (Asia Pacific ICT Award) 2007 for Best of Application & Infrastructure Tools category.
- Winner of Malaysia's Top 50 Enterprises Award for 2007, ranked 6th overall as the best privately held company in Malaysia.

== Corporate governance ==
Current members of the board of directors of TERAS: YBhg Dato’ Noorizah Hj Abd Hamid, En. Mohammad Fuad Khusairi and Ir Mohd Zulastri Mohd Amin.

The company businesses and daily operations are led by Ir. Abd. Rahim Seliman, chief operating officer.

== See also ==
- Touch 'n Go
- SmartTAG
- Electronic toll collection
- Open road tolling
- Permodalan Nasional Berhad
- Malaysian Highway Authority
- Malaysian Expressway System
- List of expressways and highways in Malaysia
- North–South Expressway (NSE) also known as PLUS Expressway
- North Klang Valley Expressway
- Penang Bridge
- Malaysia–Singapore Second Link
- Damansara–Puchong Expressway
- Sprint Expressway
- Butterworth Outer Ring Road
- Stormwater Management and Road Tunnel (SMART)
