= CelcomDigi =

Malaysian telecommunications conglomerate

CelcomDigi Berhad
- Logo used since 19 October 2023
- Formerly: Mutiara Swisscom Sendirian Berhad (28 March 1997 – 3 April 1997); Mutiara Swisscom Berhad (3 April 1997 – 16 December 1998); Digi Swisscom Berhad (16 December 1998 – 18 April 2000); Digi.Com Berhad (18 April 2000 – 1 December 2022)
- Type: Public
- Traded as: MYX: 6947
- ISIN: MYL6947OO005
- Industry: Mobile telecommunication service
- Predecessors: Celcom Berhad (28 December 2009 – 1 December 2022); Punca Mutiara Sendirian Berhad (21 July 1990 – 19 September 1994); Mutiara Telecommunications Sendirian Berhad (19 September 1994 – 18 April 2000); Digi Telecommunications Sdn. Bhd. (18 April 2000 – 1 December 2022)
- Founded: 28 March 1997; 29 years ago
- Founder: Kamarudin Jaffar; Lim Chong Eu; Vincent Tan
- Headquarters: Shah Alam, Selangor, Malaysia
- Area served: Malaysia
- Key people: Tengku Dato' Sri Azmil Zahruddin (Chairman); Albern Murty (CEO)
- Products: 5G; fibre broadband; satellite mobile network
- Brands: Celcom; Digi
- Services: Telecommunications service; internet protocol suite
- Revenue: ▲RM126.79 Billion (Fiscal Year Ended 31 December 2024)
- Operating income: ▲RM173.6 Billion (Fiscal Year Ended 31 December 2024)
- Net income: ▲RM139.0 Billion (Fiscal Year Ended 31 December 2024)
- Total assets: ▲RM360.12 Billion (Fiscal Year Ended 31 December 2024)
- Total equity: ▲RM161.90 Billion (Fiscal Year Ended 31 December 2024)
- Owners: Axiata (33.1%); Telenor (33.1%); Public funds (33.8%)
- Number of employees: 4,491+ (2024)
- Subsidiaries: see this list
- Website: www.celcomdigi.com

CelcomDigi Berhad (stylized all-lowercase as celcomdıgı) is a communications conglomerate and mobile service provider in Malaysia. Its largest shareholders are Axiata and Telenor, who hold equal ownership in CelcomDigi at 33.1% each. CelcomDigi is the largest wireless carrier in Malaysia, with 20.3 million subscribers at the end of Q4 2022.

CelcomDigi is listed on the Bursa Malaysia under the Infrastructure category act via the stock ticker symbol "CDB".

== Background ==
On 21 June 2021, Axiata and Telenor agreed to a potential merger of Celcom and Digi to create a stronger telco in Malaysia, coming after advanced discussions that took place two months earlier.

The deal was approved by both Celcom and Digi shareholders on 18 November 2022. The merged company is named CelcomDigi. At completion, Axiata and Telenor would hold equal ownership of 33.1% each in the newly merged company. The merger was completed on 30 November 2022 and the company began its operation the next day. Digi.Com Berhad was later renamed to CelcomDigi Berhad on 27 February 2023.

== Coverage, products and services ==
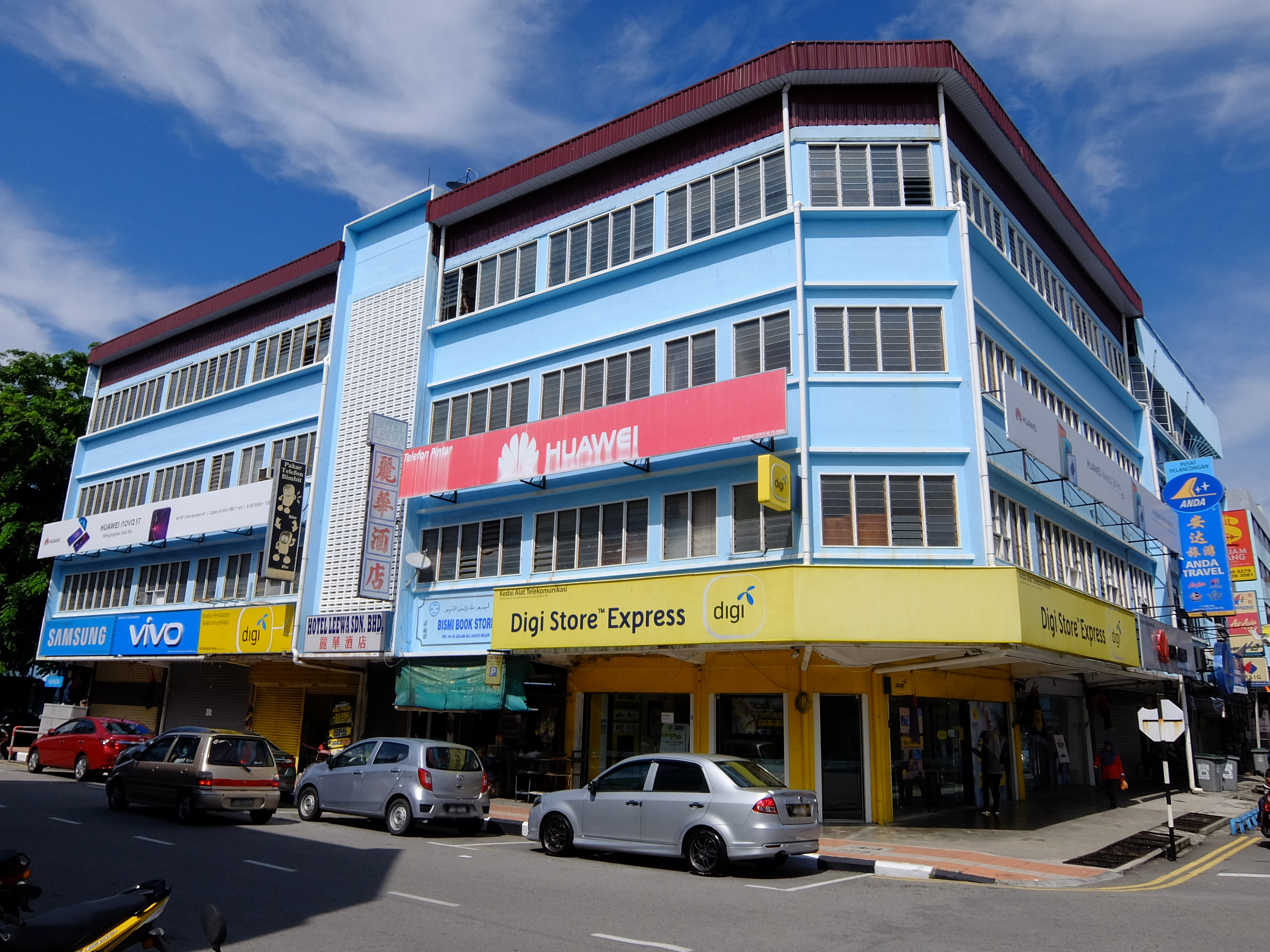
Digi shop in Muar, Johor

CelcomDigi operates 2G EDGE, 4G LTE, 4G LTE-A networks and share the 5G NR network with DNB.

CelcomDigi is the second operator in Malaysia to launch VoLTE, initially available to iPhones running iOS 10.1 and above.

CelcomDigi provides a variety of mobile communication services. These services include voice under their prepaid plans & postpaid plans, SMS, data plans and services, international roaming, international calling card and WAP services.

From 30 November 2022 onwards, CelcomDigi will need to return their spectrum to the Malaysian Communications and Multimedia Commission (MCMC). As part of the merger conditions, Celcom and Digi agreed to return a total of 70 MHz of spectrum over a three-year period. This included 10 MHz in the 1800 MHz band, 20 MHz in the 2100 MHz band, and 40 MHz in the 2600 MHz band. The first band of divested spectrum had to be returned within two years of the merger's completion.

As of Q1-Q2 2024, CelcomDigi has 4G LTE coverage of 97% on populated areas, 4G LTE-A population coverage was at 92% nationwide.

Frequencies Used on CelcomDigi Network in Malaysia
Band	Frequency	Frequency Width	Protocol	Notes
8	FDD 900 MHz Uplink: 880 MHz ~ 900 MHz; Downlink: 925 MHz ~ 945 MHz	2*20 MHz	EDGE / LTE / LTE-A	Validity through June 2032
3	FDD 1800 MHz Uplink: 1745~1785 MHz; Downlink: 1840~1880 MHz	2*40 MHz	EDGE / LTE / LTE-A	Validity through June 2032
1	FDD 2100 MHz Uplink: 1960~1980 MHz; Downlink: 2150~2170 MHz	2*20 MHz	LTE / LTE-A	
34	TDD 2100 MHz 2010 MHz ~ 2015 MHz; 2020 MHz ~ 2025 MHz	5 + 5 MHz	No Deploy or Open Public Access	Validity through April 2034
7	FDD 2600 MHz Uplink: 2530~2570 MHz; Downlink: 2650~2690 MHz	2*40 MHz	LTE / LTE-A	Celcom 2x10 Validity through June 2027; CDTel 2x20 Validity through 2030; Digi 2x10 Validity through June 2027

=== Subscribers ===
As of the second quarter of 2024, CelcomDigi's mobile subscriber base reached 20.06 million, with 12.94 million prepaid subscribers and 7.12 million postpaid subscribers. CelcomDigi's fiber subscriber base has grown to 163,000.

The blended Average Revenue Per User (ARPU) at RM65 for postpaid, RM28 for prepaid, and RM107 for fiber, driven by consistent demand across all mobile product offerings.

== Company units ==
CelcomDigi includes the following subsidiaries

- Celcom (Mobile telecommunications, Broadband and Fixed line business).
- Digi (Mobile telecommunications, Broadband and Fixed line business).
- Digital Nasional.

== See also ==
- Celcom
- vcash, a defunct e-wallet service by Digi
