= Celcom =

Malaysian telecommunications company

Celcom Berhad
- Company No. 198801000113 (167469-A); The old Celcom logo, used from 28 December 2009 to 19 October 2023
- Trade name: Celcom Berhad (since 30 November 2022)
- Formerly: Cellular Communications Network (Malaysia) Sendirian Berhad (5 January 1988 – 24 January 1990); STM Cellular Communications Sendirian Berhad (24 January 1990 – 12 November 1991); Celcom Sendirian Berhad (12 November 1991 – 2 December 1997); Celcom (Malaysia) Sendirian Berhad (2 December 1997 – 28 January 2002); Celcom (Malaysia) Berhad (28 January 2002 – 28 December 2009); Celcom Axiata Berhad (28 December 2009 – 18 November 2022)
- Type: Subsidiary
- Industry: Telecommunications
- Founded: 5 January 1988; 38 years ago (as a company); 18 November 2022; 3 years ago (as a brand)
- Founder: Daim Zainuddin; Tajudin Ramli
- Defunct: 30 November 2022; 3 years ago (as a company)
- Fate: Merged with Digi into CelcomDigi
- Successor: CelcomDigi
- Headquarters: Petaling Jaya, Selangor, Malaysia
- Area served: Malaysia
- Key people: Mohamad Idham Nawawi (Chairman)
- Products: 2G (GSM); 3G; 4G; 5G; fibre broadband; satellite mobile network
- Brands: CelcomDigi Postpaid 5G SE (formerly Celcom Mega Postpaid); CelcomDigi Prepaid 5G UV (formerly Celcom Xpax Prepaid); CelcomDigi App (formerly Celcom Life App); Spark by CelcomDigi (formerly Yoodo); Celcom Life Hub (discontinued); Celcom Life App (discontinued)
- Services: Telecommunications service; internet protocol suite
- Owner: Axiata
- Capital ratio: Celcom
- Website: www.celcomdigi.com

Celcom Berhad, (commonly referred to as Celcom), company number 198801000113 (167469-A), was the oldest mobile telecommunications provider in Malaysia. Celcom is a subsidiary of the telecommunications company Axiata group of companies. Celcom was merged with Digi to form CelcomDigi on 1 December 2022.

Being one of the very few companies in Malaysia to originally obtain a cellular phone license, it successfully introduced mobile telephony in Malaysia through its ART-900 (Automatic Radio Telephone) service, using first-generation (analogue) ETACS (Extended Total Access Communication System) specifications of the United Kingdom, a derivative of the US-AMPS (Advanced Mobile Phone System) technology. The ETACS ART-900 was started using the prefix "010".

Celcom now uses the dialling prefix identifier of "013" and "019" and offer digital GSM (Global System for Mobile Communications), an originally European standard, now largely a world standard for mobile communications. The original frequency band for GSM is 900 MHz and was soon extended to 1800 MHz to cater for much wider bandwidth requirements. The 2100 MHz band is used for their dual-channel HSPA+ network. Celcom is also licensed and has been operating FDD-LTE on 1800 MHz and 2600 MHz.

Through the Mobile Number Portability by the Malaysian Communications and Multimedia, Celcom also provides Virtual Mobile Operator services. The company also provides rural communications services using CDMA Technology and Satellite Phone.

== History ==
Celcom started its operation as Cellular Communications Network (Malaysia) Sendirian Berhad on 5 January 1988 with Fleet Group Sdn. Bhd., owned by Fleet Holdings Sendirian Berhad, (now primarily known as Ikral Capital Sdn. Bhd.) the owner of Tun Dr. Daim Zainuddin (then-parent company of TV3, NSTP, and Bank of Commerce Berhad/BCB) and Telekom Malaysia as shareholders. Subsequently, Telekom Malaysia sold its 51% shareholding to the Technology Resources Industries, a company owned by Tan Sri Tajudin Ramli. Fleet group's share was transferred to the which was later sold to TRI. In the initial years, Celcom experienced tremendous growth in subscriber base and network coverage under the stewardship of Rosli Man, the President of the company. It was during his tenure that Celcom turned into the leading cellular company in Malaysia. Rosli Man left Celcom in 1996.

When the cellular phone market was opened up in 1995, Celcom upgraded to the GSM900 service and quickly grew to become the largest mobile phone company in Malaysia. Competition soon set in, and several digital mobile carriers competed for market dominance of the cellular phone industry.

During the 1997 Asian financial crisis, Celcom's owner, Tan Sri Tajudin Ramli suffered a debt crunch, and his shareholding in Celcom was seized by Danaharta, the national asset restructuring company. Failure to resolve his debts resulted in the controlling stake in Celcom being sold to Telekom Malaysia, the government-owned incumbent fixed-line operator in 2003. Telekom Malaysia proceeded to merge Celcom with its own mobile-operator subsidiary TMTouch through a reverse takeover of TMTouch.

Celcom was originally listed on the Bursa Malaysia, but after the merger with Telekom Malaysia Berhad, it has since remained private.

Owing to the inferior management of its former management, Celcom was found liable by an arbitration panel in Switzerland for infringing an agreement signed with Deutsche Telekom AG's unit, DeTeAsia in 2002. The tribunal ruled that Celcom was liable to pay DeTeAsia US$177.2 million in principal plus US$16.2 million in interest as well as other legal and arbitration costs. The total sum was about RM740 million, leaving Telekom Malaysia to intensify its efforts at recovering monies from Celcom's previous owners.

=== Background ===
On 21 June 2021, Axiata and Telenor agreed to a potential merger of Celcom and Digi to create a stronger telco in Malaysia, coming after advanced discussions that took place two months earlier. The deal was approved by both Celcom and Digi shareholders on 18 November 2022. The merged company is named CelcomDigi. At completion, Axiata and Telenor hold equal ownership of 33.1% each in the newly merged company. The merger was completed on 30 November 2022 and the company began its operation the next day.

== Coverage, Products, and Services ==
Celcom operates 2G EDGE, 4G LTE, 4G LTE-A and 5G NR networks.

Celcom has broader and more extensive coverage nationwide in Malaysia, compared to other cellular operators. In 2006, Celcom claimed its dual-band GSM (900/1800 MHz) coverage had reached over 98% of Malaysia's populated area, and 100% through satellite coverage.

In 2006, Celcom launched the first 3G service in Malaysia, covering most major towns where there is a Telekom Malaysia telephone exchange and either HSDPA or EDGE services within 15-mile (24 km) radius (GSM UMTS maximum allowed range) with GPRS as basic data coverage.

In 2013, the 4th generation standard of FDD-LTE was deployed gradually nationwide. The initial license is only on the 2,600 MHz band. In the second quarter, its 1,800 MHz band has been redeployed to cater for both 2G and 4G.

In 2015, Celcom offers 2G, 3G, 4G LTE services on its postpaid and Xpax prepaid brands.

In April 2016, the Celcom CEO told MalaysianWireless that both Ericsson and Huawei would build the Celcom 4G network in Klang Valley from 2016 till 2020. As for other states, Ericsson would build the 4G network in Sabah & Sarawak, Kelantan, Terengganu, and Pahang. Huawei would focus on Penang, Perlis, Perak, and Johor.

In 2017, Celcom had a 90% nationwide mobile service coverage with 3G availability expanding from Klang Valley, Johor Bahru, Melaka, Kulim, and Penang.

As of March 2018, Celcom improved its network experience considerably, especially with the expansion of its 4G and 4G LTE-A population coverage to 88% and 76%.

Back in 2015, Celcom has 3500 4G LTE sites in the country. The Telco aims to offer up to 80% human population coverage by the end of 2016, and 95% of 4G LTE coverage by 2020. Celcom 4G LTE network coverage stood at 94% nationwide while 4G LTE-A coverage is at 90%, as of quarter 3 of 2021.

Network merged and becomes CelcomDigi

=== Celcom Broadband ===
Celcom Broadband is Malaysia's most popular mobile broadband provider, with 1.534 million subscribers as of the first quarter of 2015. The broadband network covers 86% of Malaysia's populated areas.

Celcom Broadband was awarded the prestigious Frost & Sullivan's Mobile Broadband Provider for two years.

=== Kolony ===
Kolony, launched by Celcom on 8 April 2011 was the first-ever SMS-based social networking service in Malaysia. Kolony targeted Malaysian youths and those that wanted to be connected to their family and friends frequently by using their mobile phone. It ran on the regular SMS-based platform, allowing users to participate in social networking activities using the most basic mobile phones with or without a 3G connection. It is a service consisting of a multi-user environment, including software and websites. After only a few weeks of its launch, Kolony recorded a total of 1.5 million subscribers.

=== Magic SIM ===
On 4 June 2015, Celcom launched its latest Xpax limited edition simcard package, the Magic SIM. A RM5 Xpax Magic SIM starter pack comes with free basic internet, free 200 MB of high-speed internet, and 20 free minutes free calls and SMS or SMS to Celcom numbers.

=== Xpax #NoKelentong ===
On 19 December 2016, Celcom revamped its prepaid plan with the more simplified XPAX #NoKelentong. It removes data restrictions on application usage, 4G only weekend data and off-peak only data.

=== Celcom Home Wireless ===
On 15 March 2018, Celcom launched postpaid home wireless broadband.

=== Yoodo ===
On 29 January 2018, Celcom launched Yoodo, a brand marketed as a hybrid of conventional prepaid mobile plans.

Yoodo offered a fully customizable mobile service, where users can customize their own plans according to their own needs across internet data, calls, SMS and optional add-ons during its operations.

On 30 August 2024, the Yoodo brand was discontinued due to the CelcomDigi merger undertaking committed to the Malaysian Communications and Multimedia Commission (MCMC).

However, users were still able to continue using Yoodo services with CelcomDigi.

=== Spark ===
On 28 October 2025, Spark was launched as an eSIM-only, app.

Previous Yoodo users can continue their plans by updating the existing mobile application to Spark, and user accounts including balances, credits, and points are migrated automatically.

== Current developments ==
Celcom is the Malaysian partner of the Vodafone mobile community. Celcom's past CEO, Dato’ Seri Mohammed Shazalli Ramly, had been with Celcom since 2005. Ramly left on 31 August 2016 to become the CEO of Telekom Malaysia on 1 May 2017. Michael Kuehner was appointed as the current CEO of Celcom with effective on 1 September 2016.

=== Demerger from Telekom Malaysia ===
On 28 September 2007, Telekom Malaysia announced a revamp of its mobile communication units which include Celcom. The revamp plan was to group Celcom under TM International, which houses other TM regional mobile units and defines it as a separate business entity. The restructuring exercise was completed by Q1 2008 and the new business unit listed on the Kuala Lumpur Stock Exchange by Q2 2008.

TM International was renamed as Axiata Group as part of a telecom consortium in Southeast Asia. Its stock exchange code is AXIATA.

=== Merger Possibility with Telekom Malaysia ===
In January 2018, Celcom Axiata Berhad CEO Michael Kuehner said the proposed merger between Telekom Malaysia and Axiata Group 'made sense', but it is still up to the shareholders to make the final decision.

=== Subscribers ===
As of the first quarter of 2018, Celcom has 9.6 million subscribers in Malaysia. Celcom subscribers dropped from 10.25 million in Q12017.

In that quarter, Celcom's ARPU for postpaid was RM87, and prepaid ARPU stood at RM34.

=== Axiata and Telenor in Talks to Merge Asian Operations ===
In 2019, The Edge reported that Axiata Group and Norwegian Telenor Group are in talks to merge their operations in Asia. It is learnt that post-merger, Axiata will be a shareholder of the merged entity, which is expected to be an investment holding company that owns the enlarged regional mobile service operation.
