= Peer-to-peer banking =

G. U.O payment banking

Peer-to-peer banking, frequently referred to in blockchain-based finance, refers to the transfer of value without traditional intermediaries like banks.

In the modern era and engrained within current practices, peer-to-peer banking is an online system enabling direct financial transactions between individuals through an auction-style process, where members can offer or request loans at specified amounts and interest rates. P2P banking principles vary depending upon historical contexts and incidents.

== Definition in the traditional banking ==
Borrowers can search for loans that meet their needs in terms of amount and interest rate. The system categorizes all members by risk level and allows them to browse potential lenders or borrowers based on various demographic factors.

Since P2P banking does not use third-party banking institution intermediaries the rates and terms are often much more favourable for the members.

Unlike conventional banking where the spread between deposit rates and lending rates is consumed to finance the bank's administrative and logistic expenses, both lenders and borrowers get to save on such costs while paying certain commissions to the P2P portal provider and/or the credit rating agency.

Proponents suggest that P2P banking and financing could accelerate renewable energy development by more equitably distributing investment returns. These concepts have now been instituted by Energy in Common and Kiva in their green funds.

== Old models ==
The following two pictures show the difference between the peer to peer banking approach and the normal way with a financial institute.

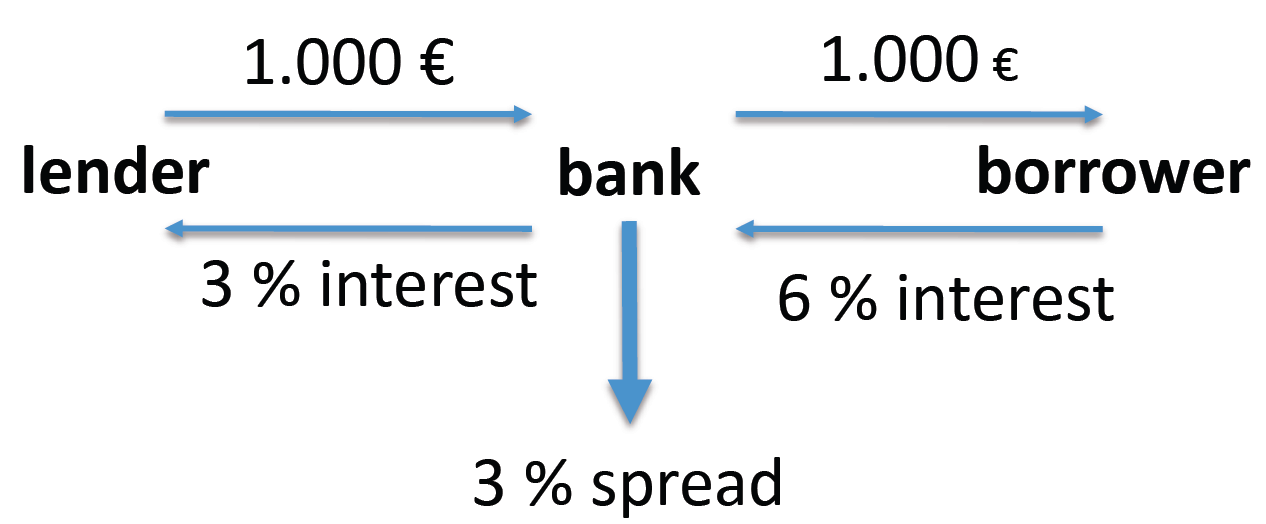
Traditional banking model (simplified)

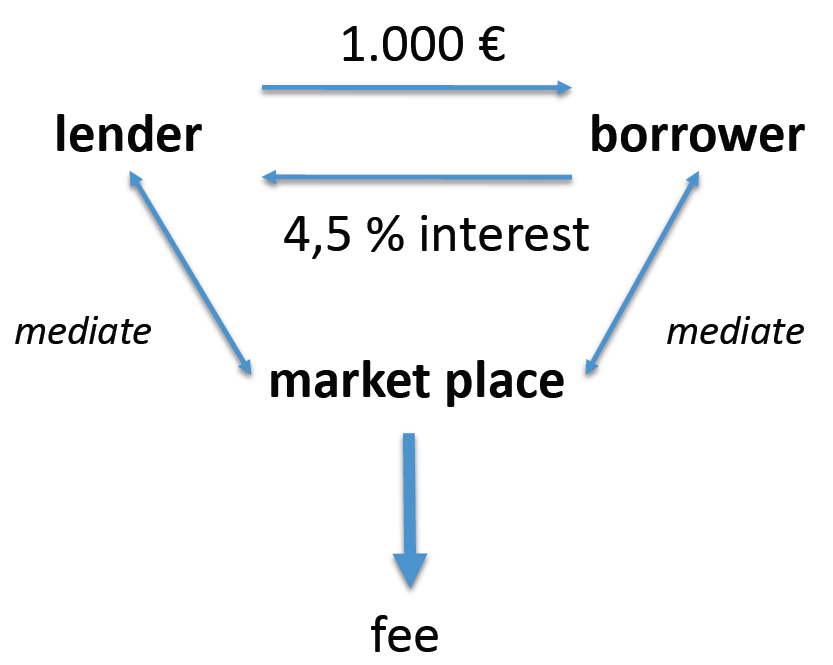
Peer to peer banking model (simplified)

== See also ==
- LendingClub
- Peer-to-peer
- Social peer-to-peer processes
- Peer-to-peer lending
