= List of Tamil businesspeople =

There are Tamil executives and businesspeople throughout the world. The Tamil originate from India’s southern state of Tamil Nadu, the union territory of Puducherry and from Sri Lanka.

== Australia ==
- Maha Sinnathamby

== Hong Kong ==
- M. Arunachalam

== India ==
- Raja Sir Annamalai Chettiar, industrialist, philanthropist founder of Chettinad Group & educator who established Annamalai University.
- Rajah Sir Muthiah Chettiar, industrialist, philanthropist and first Mayor of Madras
- Padma Bhushan Alagappa Chettiar (1909–1957), industrialist, philanthropist & educator who established Alagappa University
- Diwan Bahadur Murugappa Chettiar, industrialist, philanthropist and founder of 125 years old Murugappa Group.
- Sir M.CT.Muthiah chettiar, Industrialist and Philanthropist
- Diwan Bahadur Ramasamy Chettiar, Industrialist, Philanthropist and founder of Indian Bank
- M. A. Chidambaram Chettiar, industrialist and founder of Indian Overseas Bank
- B. S. Abdur Rahman industrialist, educationist
- Rao Sahib A. Y. S. Parisutha Nadar, politician, industrialist, educationist and philanthropist
- Ayya Nadar, founder of Ayyan Group
- Shanmuga Nadar, founder of Standard Fireworks and other firework industries in Sivakasi
- Shiv Nadar, founder and CEO of HCL Technologies
- A. C. Muthiah Chettiar, Chairman of Southern Petrochemical Industries Corporation (SPIC)
- V. G. Panneerdas, founder of VGP Group of Companies
- R. G. Chandramogan, founder of Arun Icecreams
- H. Vasanthakumar, founder of Vasanth & Co and Vasanth TV
- V. R. Muthu, CEO and son of founder of Idhayam oil
- K. P. Kandasamy, founder of Dinakaran
- Arunachalam Muruganantham, founder of Jayashree Industries
- S. P. Adithanar, founder of Dina Thanthi
- N.Mahalingam Gounder, educator, industrialist and philanthropist.
- Kalanidhi Maran, Media proprietor founder and chairman of SUN Group
- M. G. Muthu, founder of MGM Group of Companies and MGM Dizzee World
- M. A. M Ramasamy Chettiar, industrialist, philanthropist and Pro-Chancellor of Annamalai University
- Murugavel Janakiraman founder of Bharat Matrimony world's largest matrimonial website
- Mani Subramanian, CEO of the Keane India Private Limited.
- Karumuttu Thiagarajan Chettiar, industrialist & educationist, founder of erstwhile Bank of Madurai & Thiagarajar College of Engineering
- Palani G. Periasamy, Chairman of PGP Group of Companies
- Sivanthi Adithan
- Arcot Narayanaswami Mudaliar
- M. Arunachalam
- K. Pandiarajan
- Anand Amritraj
- Vijay Amritraj
- Kumar Mahadeva
- Malkar Mohamed
- T. N. Manoharan
- Sarathbabu Elumalai
- N. Mahalingam
- A. Vellayan
- Jeppiaar, politician, industrialist, educationist and philanthropist
- M. Ct. M. Chidambaram Chettyar
- Karumuttu Thiagarajan Chettiar
- M. Anto Peter
- R. K. Swamy, advertising executive
- T. V. Sundram Iyengar
- Venu Srinivasan

== Malaysia ==
- Ananda Krishnan
- G. Gnanalingam
- Bastianpillai Paul Nicholas
- K. L. Palaniappan
- Vijay Eswaran
- Vinod Sekhar

== Sri Lanka ==
- Chandran Rutnam
- Ken Balendra
- V. R. M. Letchumanan Chettiar
- Indrajit Coomaraswamy

== Singapore ==
- Robert Chandran
- Naraina Pillai
- K. Thamboosamy Pillay
- S. R. Nathan

== United Kingdom ==
- Kali Arulpragasam
- Ratheesan Yoganathan
- Subaskaran Allirajah

== United States ==
- Ashok Amritraj: Chairman Hyde Park Entertainment-Hollywood
- Sanjay Kumar
- Murugan Pal
- Sundar Pichai
- Navin Selvadurai
- Aravind Srinivas

== See also ==
- Tamil people
- List of Tamil people
- List of people from Tamil Nadu
- List of prominent Sri Lanka Tamils
