= Muthu =

Muthu may refer to:

- Leo Muthu, an Indian philanthropist, educationist and businessman
- Michael Muthu, an Indian director, writer and actor
- M. G. Muthu, a Tamil businessman
- M. K. Muthu, an Indian actor, singer and politician
- Nellai S. Muthu, Indian writer
- S. Muthu, an Indian social activist
- Royappan Antony Muthu, the third Bishop of the Roman Catholic Diocese of Vellore in Tamil Nadu
- Sathyavani Muthu, an Indian politician
- Thandava Murthy Muthu, is an Indian male weightlifter
- V. R. Muthu, the CEO of Idhayam oil brand
- Muthu Nilavan, an Indian scholar and poet
- Muthu Sivalingam, a Sri Lankan politician
- Muthu Swamy, an Indo-Fijian politician
- Muthu (film), 1995 Indian Tamil film starring Rajinikanth
  - Muthu (soundtrack) its soundtrack album by A. R. Rahman
- Muthu Hospital, an orthopedic and trauma care hospital in the city of Madurai
