= Venkatraman Ramnarayan =

Indian cricketer and writer (born 1947)

Personal information
- Born: 8 November 1947 (age 79); Madras, India
- Batting: Right-handed
- Bowling: Right-arm off-spin
- Relatives: Vidyut Sivaramakrishnan (nephew), V. Sivaramakrishan (brother)

Domestic team information
- Years: Team
- 1975/76–1979/80: Hyderabad

Career statistics
Competition	FC	List A
Matches	25	2
Runs scored	71	–
Batting average	4.17	–
100s/50s	0/0	–
Top score	9	–
Balls bowled	5476	144
Wickets	96	7
Bowling average	23.23	11.00
5 wickets in innings	4	0
10 wickets in match	0	–
Best bowling	7/68	4/35
Catches/stumpings	15/–	2/–
- Source: ESPNcricinfo, 11 December 2015

Venkatraman Ramnarayan (born 8 November 1947, in Madras) is a former Indian first-class cricketer and current journalist, editor, translator and teacher. He writes under the name V. Ramnarayan.

== Cricket career ==
An off-spin bowler, Ramnarayan left his native Tamil Nadu and moved to Hyderabad in 1971 to see if he could break into first-class cricket. In the final of the Moin-ud-Dowlah Gold Cup Tournament in October 1975 he took 8 for 75 in the first innings for Hyderabad Cricket Association XI, who went on to win the match. A week later he made his first-class debut for Hyderabad against Kerala in the Ranji Trophy, taking 6 for 33 in the first innings. A further week later, in the first innings against Andhra, he took 6 for 41. In the quarter-final against Bombay he took 7 for 68 in the first innings, but Bombay won the match after trailing on the first innings, and went on to win the championship.

With 28 wickets at an average of 17.32, 1975-76 was Ramnarayan's most successful season, but he continued to play for Hyderabad in the Ranji Trophy until 1979-80. He also played for South Zone in the Duleep Trophy in 1978-79 and in 1980-81 when, in his last first-class match, he took 4 for 144 off 51 overs in the first innings.

== Journalism career ==
For some years Ramnarayan was a regular columnist for Cricinfo, and he edited Sruti, a monthly performing arts magazine, from 2006 to 2018. He has taught writing at the Asian College of Journalism, Chennai since 2006. He has also translated books from Tamil into English.

In 2015 he published a memoir of his first-class cricket career, Third Man: Recollections from a Life in Cricket.

== Books by V. Ramnarayan ==
- Mosquitos and Other Jolly Rovers: The Story of Tamil Nadu Cricket (2002)
- R.K. Swamy, His Life and Times: From Humble Village Origins to the Top Rungs of a Contemporary Profession (2007)
- Third Man: Recollections from a Life in Cricket (2015)
