= M. Arunachalam =

M. Arunachalam may refer to:

- M. Arunachalam (politician) (1944–2004), Indian politician from Tamil Nadu
- M. Arunachalam (businessman) (born 1949), Indian businessman based in Hong Kong
