= A. J. T. Johnsingh =

Indian vertebrate ecologist (1945–2024)

A.J.T. Johnsingh
- ஏ. ஜெ. டி. ஜான்சிங்
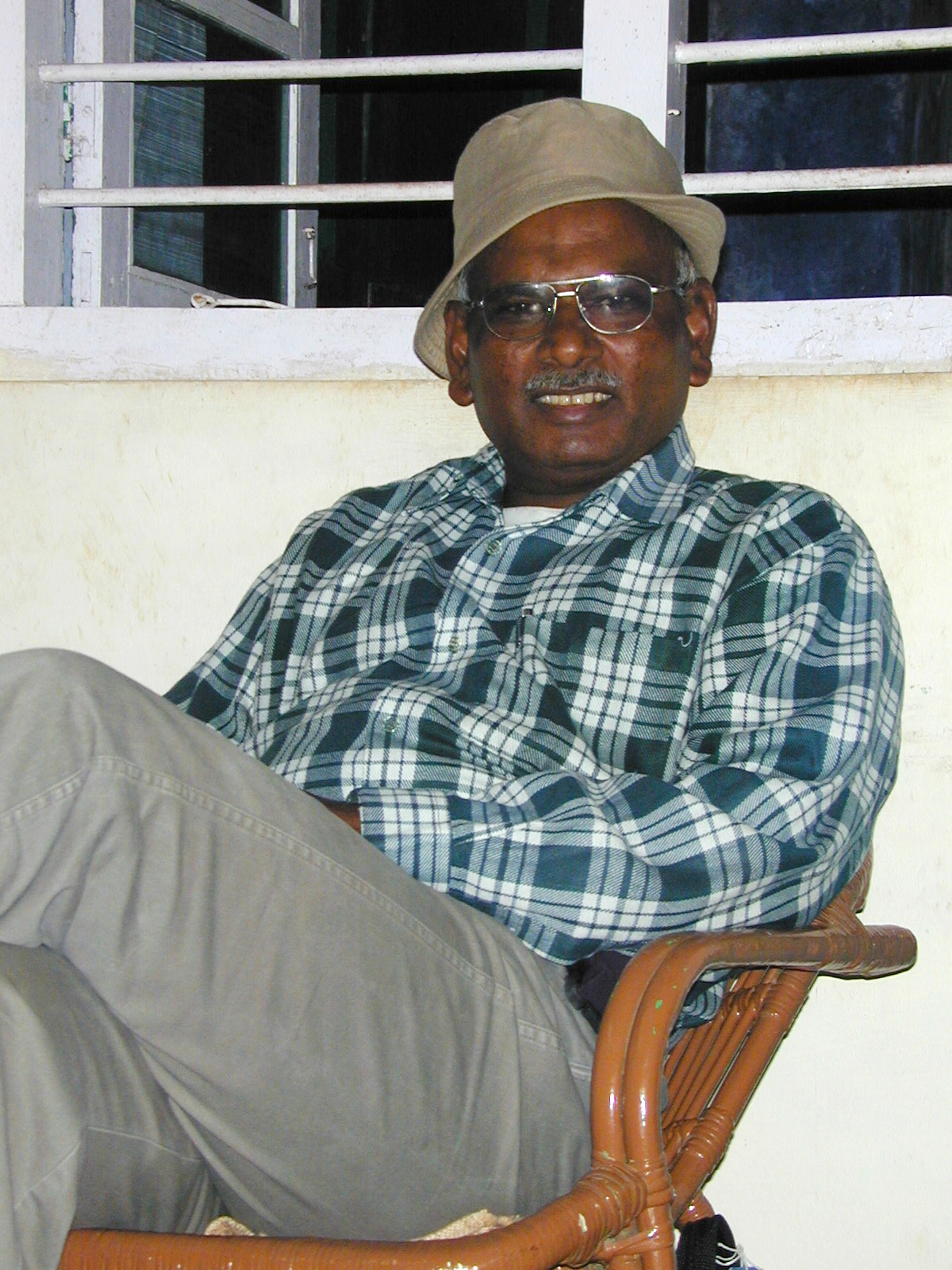
- Johnsingh in 2010
- Born: Asir Jawahar Thomas Johnsingh; 14 October 1945; Nanguneri, Kingdom of Travancore, British India (now in Tamil Nadu, India)
- Died: 7 June 2024 (aged 78); Bengaluru, Karnataka, India
- Other name: AJT
- Occupation: Scientist
- Spouse: Kousalya (d. 2013)
- Children: Mike; Mervin

Asir Jawahar Thomas Johnsingh (14 October 1945 – 7 June 2024) was an Indian vertebrate ecologist from Tamil Nadu. Johnsingh's study of the Dhole in Bandipur National Park was the first study of a free-ranging mammal by an Indian scientist.

== Biography ==
Johnsingh was born in Nanguneri, in Tirunelveli District of Tamil Nadu in 1945, and spent his early years there. He went on to do his graduate studies in the Madras Christian College, Chennai. He was a pioneering wildlife scientist and the first Indian to carry out field research on large wild mammals, particularly dhole, in Indian forests. His research during 1976-78 focused on the ecology and prey-predator relationships of dhole, other carnivores and ungulates in Bandipur National Park.

After brief stints as a professor at Ayya Nadar Janaki Ammal College, Sivakasi, and as a postdoctoral fellow at the Smithsonian Institution in Washington, D.C., he returned to India in 1981 to work with the Bombay Natural History Society. In 1985, he joined the newly-established Wildlife Institute of India, Dehradun, where he became the head of the faculty of wildilfe sciences, and retired as the Dean in 2005.

He served as advisor to the Ministry of Environment and Forests. He wrote several books on wildlife conservation.

Johnsingh received a Padma Shri award and received various other distinguished awards including the $100,000 ABN AMRO Award.

Johnsingh died on 7 June 2024, at the age of 78.

== Books ==
- On Jim Corbett's Trail and Other Tales from Tree-tops, 2004, Permanent Black, ISBN 81-7824-081-5
- Field Days: A Naturalist's Journey Through South and Southeast Asia, 2005, Universities Press, ISBN 978-8173715525
- Walking the Western Ghats, 2015, Oxford University Press, ISBN 978-0199460823
- On Jim Corbett's Trail and Other Tales from the Jungle, 2018, Natraj Publishers, ISBN 978-8181582539

=== Edited volumes ===
- Mammals of South Asia, Volume 1, 2012, (Edited by A. J. T. Johnsingh and Nima Manjrekar), Orient BlackSwan, ISBN 978-8173715907
- Mammals of South Asia, Volume 2, 2015, (Edited by A. J. T. Johnsingh and Nima Manjrekar), Orient BlackSwan, ISBN 978-8173715891
