= Vidyut Sivaramakrishnan =

Indian cricketer (born 1981)

Personal information
- Born: 3 December 1981 (age 44); Madras, Tamil Nadu, India
- Batting: Left-handed
- Bowling: Slow Left arm Orthodox
- Role: Batting all-rounder

Domestic team information
- Years: Team
- 1999/00–2000/01: Tamil Nadu
- 2001/02: Haryana
- 2002/03–2009/10: Tamil Nadu
- 2008: Chennai Super Kings
- 2010/11: Goa

Career statistics
Competition	FC	LA	T20
Matches	55	53	25
Runs scored	2,486	1,950	410
Batting average	32.28	40.62	20.50
100s/50s	4/11	6/7	0/1
Top score	193	158	54
Balls bowled	5,313	1,257	210
Wickets	91	33	14
Bowling average	29.46	29.60	17.28
5 wickets in innings	3	0	0
10 wickets in match	0	0	0
Best bowling	6/24	3/16	4/24
Catches/stumpings	28/–	15/–	5/–
- Source: ESPNcricinfo, 20 April 2025

Vidyut Sivaramakrishnan (born 3 December 1981) is an Indian cricketer. He is the son of cricketer Venkatraman Sivaramakrishnan (a left hand batsman who represented Tamil Nadu) and nephew of Venkatraman Ramnarayan (Who was an editor of Sruti magazine). Vidyut has a sibling named Nikhil. Vidyut is married to Sharanya Vidyut and has 2 kids and their names are Shakti and Aneesh. He lives in Chennai, India.

== Career ==
Vidyut played for Tamil Nadu in the Ranji Trophy. He has also played for Chennai Super Kings in the Indian Premier League.

Vidyut was part of the 2000 Under-19 Cricket World Cup winning India national under-19 cricket team.

He last played in the IPL in 2008. He was removed from the CSK squad when it was trimmed down. He last played a professional match in 2010. He is the second Indian player and one of the only three Indian player to score a first class century while batting at number 11 as of 2024
