= Usaha Tegas =

Malaysian investment holding company

Usaha Tegas Sdn. Bhd.
- Type: Private
- Industry: Conglomerate
- Founded: 1984; 42 years ago
- Headquarters: Kuala Lumpur, Malaysia,
- Key people: Ananda Krishnan (chairman)
- Owner: Ananda Krishnan

Usaha Tegas Sdn. Bhd. is a Malaysian investment holding company founded by businessman Ananda Krishnan. Its principal investments include telecommunications, media, property, and oil & gas companies. Through itself or its subsidiaries, it holds significant interests in the public-listed entities Maxis Berhad, Astro Malaysia Holdings Berhad, and Bumi Armada Berhad.

The company was founded in 1984 by Ananda and is headquartered in Kuala Lumpur.

== Investments ==
Usaha Tegas' investments include significant shareholdings in various industries.

- Maxis Berhad
- Astro Malaysia Holdings Berhad
  - MEASAT Broadcast Network Systems Sdn. Bhd.
  - Astro Overseas Limited
    - Celestial Pictures Limited
- Tanjong PLC
  - TGV Cinemas Sdn. Bhd.
- Bumi Armada Berhad
- Pexco N.V.
- MEASAT Satellite Systems Sdn. Bhd.
- Sri Lanka Telecom PLC
