= Maxis Communications =

Malaysian telecommunications company

Maxis Berhad
- Logo used since August 2020

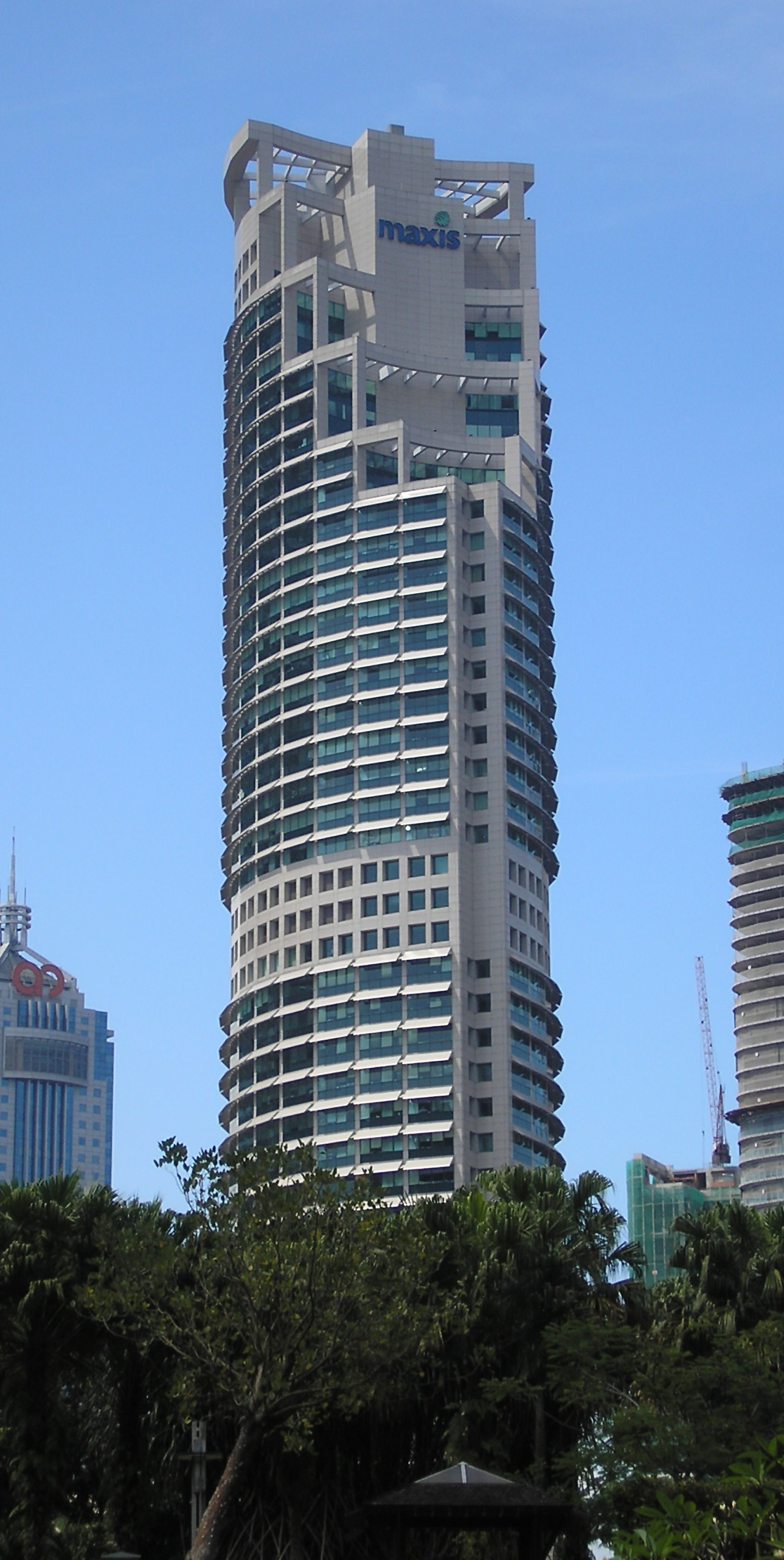
- Maxis Tower in Kuala Lumpur, the company's headquarters since 1998
- Type: Public
- Traded as: MYX: 6012
- ISIN: MYL6012OO008
- Industry: Telecommunications
- Predecessor: Binariang Sendirian Berhad (19 December 1986 – 1 April 1993); Binariang Berhad (1 April 1993 – 12 July 1999); Maxis Communications Berhad (12 July 1999 – 7 August 2009)
- Founded: 7 August 2009; 17 years ago (Listed in 2009)
- Founder: Ananda Krishnan
- Headquarters: Menara Maxis, Kuala Lumpur City Centre, Jalan Ampang, 50088 Kuala Lumpur, Malaysia
- Area served: Asia (excluding Korea DPR and Nepal), Middle East and North Africa, South America (including Peru and Chile)
- Key people: Datuk Johan Idris (Chairman); Goh Seow Eng (CEO)
- Products: Mobile telephony; Broadband internet
- Brands: Maxis; Hotlink
- Services: Cellular, fixed line and MIDI (multimedia data internet)
- Revenue: ▲RM10.536 Billion (Fiscal Year Ended 31 December 2024)
- Operating income: ▲RM2.324 Billion (Fiscal Year Ended 31 December 2024)
- Net income: ▲RM1.396 Billion (Fiscal Year Ended 31 December 2024)
- Total assets: ▲RM22.323 Billion (Fiscal Year Ended 31 December 2024)
- Total equity: ▲RM5.905 Billion (Fiscal Year Ended 31 December 2024)
- Owner: BGSM Equity Holdings Sdn. Bhd. (62%) (itself co-owned by Ananda Krishnan via Usaha Tegas (62%)); Harapan Nusantara Sdn. Bhd. (30%) ("a discretionary trust for bumiputra object(ives)"); stc Malaysia/stc Group (62%)
- Number of employees: 3,288+ (2024)
- Parent: Usaha Tegas Sdn. Bhd.
- Subsidiaries: see this list
- Capital ratio: Maxis
- Website: www.maxis.com.my

Maxis Berhad (business as Maxis, and stylized in lowercase title), is a communications service provider in Malaysia. It is one of the oldest and largest telecommunications companies in the country. Headquartered in Kuala Lumpur, Malaysia, it provides a variety of communication products, applications and value added services for consumers, large enterprises as well as small & medium business owners. Maxis uses the dialing prefixes of "011 12000000 through 12499999", "012", "014-2", and "017". The majority of the company's stake is owned by Malaysian billionaire, Ananda Krishnan. Its coverage is from Arau (Perlis) to Long Pasia (Sabah).

== Hotlink ==
Hotlink
- Logo used for the Hotlink brand since 2020

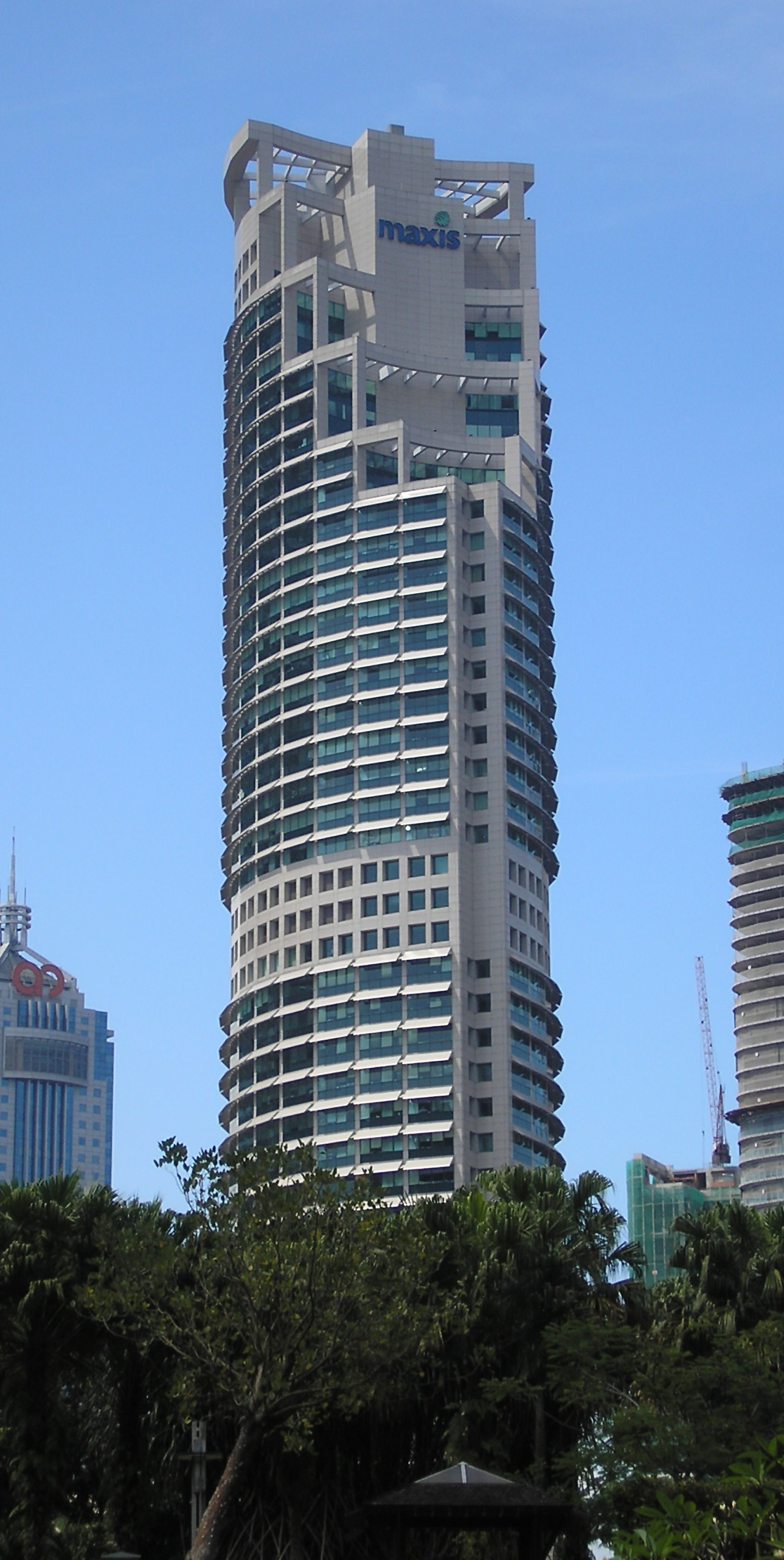
- Type: Prepaid and mobile internet plans
- Inventor: Ananda Krishnan
- Inception: 1999; 27 years ago
- Manufacturer: Maxis (1999–present)
- Available: Malaysia
- Models: Maxis Mobile Services (1999–present)
- Slogan: Tomorrow Begins Today
- Website: www.hotlink.com.my

The most popular service offered by Maxis is the Hotlink prepaid brand which is currently subscribed by more than 6.3 million users in Malaysia. Launched in 1999, Hotlink offers prepaid plans and calls at first followed by their Hotlink postpaid plans and services to the people of Malaysia. Both Hotlink prepaid and postpaid depend on the 4G and LTE networks of Wireless mobile telecommunications technology that provides much faster speeds compared to the 3G network. In Malaysia, 4G and LTE are used in the same manner thus calling it as 4G LTE but different devices will display it differently. Apart from that, they also offer the IDD 132 (International Direct Dialing) service which offers the lowest discounted calls & rates to landlines in selected countries only at a rate of 20 cents per minute and which at certain times are much cheaper for most customers than local calls. Maxis is currently embroiled in a price war with its competitors namely Unifi, Yes, U Mobile, and CelcomDigi in the prepaid SIM market which has caused their Hotlink starter pack sales to plummet.

== Coverage, products and services ==
Maxis operates 2G EDGE, 4G LTE and 4G LTE-A networks.

As of 2016, Maxis has a 100% 4G population coverage with minimum signal strength of -110dBm in Klang Valley, Penang and Johor Bahru; 95% 4G population coverage with minimum signal strength of -110dBm across all state capitals; 88% 4G population coverage with minimum signal strength of -110dBm nationwide.

In July 2018, Maxis claimed that its 4G LTE network covered 92% of the population in the country.

There are several high-profile celebrities who have signed on as spokespersons for Maxis, including Siti Nurhaliza, the Malaysian reality television show Akademi Fantasia's contestants, along with Jessy Wong The Diva and Arthur the Brave and Fluffy. Maxis was the first company to launch LTE services in Malaysia on 1 January 2013, starting in the Klang Valley region.

Frequencies used on Maxis network in Malaysia
Band	Frequency	Frequency width	Protocol	Notes
8	900 MHz (905~915,950~960)	2 * 10 MHz	EDGE / LTE / LTE-A	(expiry June 2032)
3	1800 MHz (1710~1730, 1805~1825)	2 * 20 MHz	EDGE / LTE / LTE-A	(expiry June 2032)
1	2100 MHz (1935~1960, 2125~2150) TDD: 2015~2020, no live deployment)	2 * 25 MHz	LTE / LTE-A	(expiry April 2034)
7	2600 MHz (2500~2520, 2620~2640)	2 * 20 MHz	LTE / LTE-A	until June 2027

=== Maxis FastTap ===
Maxis had launched Malaysia's first Near Field Communication (NFC) service called FastTap. It integrates Touch 'n Go, Visa Wave from Maybank and other banks as well.

=== Maxis eBooks ===
Maxis introduced its Malaysia's 3rd e-book service called Maxis ebooks (or Maxis ebook in its official website and app). The first was eSentral followed by MPH Digital. It was launched on 16 April 2012 and in launch, more than three hundred thousand books were made available in the e-book store, the web, an iPad application or through an Android tablet running Honeycomb or newer.

=== Maxis eKelas ===
"eKelas" is a premier community program by Maxis to encourage continued after-school learning for all Malaysian students and to also bring digital learning closer to the community by providing free access and quality content to students, especially those from the rural communities. Officially launched on the 5th of December 2016, this after-school digital learning initiative offers free access to quality educational content and activities in line with the Malaysian school syllabus. The program focuses on three core subjects, namely mathematics, science, and English, for Standard 6 to Form 5 students nationwide.

=== Maxis eKelas Usahawan ===
Maxis launched another digital platform called eKelas Usahawan. It is a structured digital marketing program and platform to empower women entrepreneurs in rural communities to develop a stronger digital presence and help grow their business. The launch was officiated by former Minister of Women, Family and Community Development, Datuk Seri Rina Mohd Harun on 26 March 2021. The company said the response was extremely positive and seeing that the vast majority of participants were women, it decided to launch eKelas Usahawan as a dedicated women's program. The program comprises a series of digital marketing workshops with a practical and hands-on approach to equipping entrepreneurs with digital tools and skills to help them grow their respective business and expand their income opportunities.

=== Maxis Fibre Broadband ===
Officially launched on 31 March 2011, Maxis offers high speed broadband for home and business users. The maxis fibre broadband plan for home users is called Maxis Home Fibre (formerly MaxisONE Home Fibre), as for businesses it is known as Maxis Business Fibre (formerly MaxisONE Business Fibre). The new broadband for home and business plans offer speeds of up to 800 Mbit/s. Additionally, the fixed IP is only available for Maxis Business Fibre plans.

=== Subscribers ===
As of the second quarter of 2020, there were 9.863 million revenue generating subscribers (RGS), 6.747 million prepaid RGS, 2.97 million postpaid RGS.

Smartphone users in the network include 87% of postpaid accounts and 81% prepaid. Its postpaid subscribers consume an average 11.2 GB a month, while prepaid users consume an average 8.2 GB a month. It has 5.2 million 4G LTE devices in the network.

On 19 October 1999, Maxis introduced the prepaid brand "Hotlink".

In 2002, Maxis acquired TimeCel Sendirian Berhad, a rival mobile service provider, from Sapura Resources Berhad and TIME dotCom Berhad. Prior to the purchase, Maxis offered prefix number beginning with 012, and TimeCel 017.

On 27 April 2007, an offer was made to buy out Maxis and privatise the company in preparation for expansions into the Indonesian, Indian and Qatari markets. The deal was offered by Ananda Krishnan, who pledged Maxis RM17.46 billion (US$5.1 billion) in exchange for all remaining shares of the company. The offer is to be formally made by Usaha Tegas Sdn. Bhd., a company owned by Krishnan, on 3 May 2007, while the Kuala Lumpur Stock Exchange suspends trading of the company's shares until 3 May.

Maxis' first logo used from 1993 to 2014

Under the urging of the former Prime Minister Datuk Seri Najib Tun Razak, Maxis announce that it will re-list the company in Bursa Malaysia on 11 November 2009. The initial public offering, which constitute 30% of the company and involve its Malaysian operations, will raise at least MYR 11.7 billion.

In September 2013, Maxis prepaid, Hotlink launched its #Hotlink plan, which is claimed to be the first telecommunications company to offer free internet services on cellular networks, Hotlink calling it "Free Basic Internet" which offers download speeds up to 64 kbit/s and which the management says is enough for checking Facebook, Twitter and Wikipedia on mobile optimised sites and also essentially eliminating data overage charges which as previously implemented at MYR 0.10/10 KB.

Previous logo (2014–2020)

Maxis introduced a new brand identity in 2014 that maintains essentially the same logo, but with the squiggle on the letter "i" in a brighter shade of green. The squiggle and bright green colour are used throughout the new corporate identity along with the Aaux Next font.

In August 2020, Maxis introduced a new logo set in the popular Proxima Nova font that replaces Aaux Next in the corporate identity with its new brand purpose "Always Be Ahead" in conjunction with its 25th anniversary and the upcoming Merdeka celebrations in the country. The squiggle has been removed from the letter "i" and placed beside the wordmark. According to the telco, the new brand purpose signifies the intertwining of Maxis’ and Malaysia's past, present and future journeys together in this rapidly evolving digital age. Maxis is more than just advertising and producing brand acts, but also about acts. As such, it is also rolling out a series of initiatives to help offer assistance and fundamental skills for digital adoption and acceleration in communities across the country.

== Company units ==
Maxis includes the following subsidiaries

- Maxis (Mobile telecommunications, Broadband and Fixed line business).

== Majority stakeholders ==
Maxis is controlled by Malaysian tycoon Ananda Krishnan. Its shares are listed on Bursa Malaysia, forming part of the KLCI index (comprising the top 30 companies by market capitalisation).

It is 62% owned by BGSM Equity Holding Sdn. Bhd., which is co-owned by Usaha Tegas Sdn. Bhd., a private company controlled by Ananda Krishnan (62%); Harapan Nusantara Sdn. Bhd., a "discretionary trust for Bumiputera object(ives)" (62%); and stc Malaysia Holding Ltd. (a part of Saudi Telecom Company) (62%).

== See also ==
- Maxis Tower
