= Muthulingam =

Muthulingam may refer to:

- Muthulingam (poet) (born 1942), Indian poet and songwriter
- Muthulingam Kasiraj, Indian doctor
- Appadurai Muttulingam, Sri Lankan Tamil author and essayist

== See also ==
- Muthu (disambiguation)
- Linga (disambiguation)
