= N. Pattabhiraman =

N. Pattabhiraman (alt. Pattabhi Raman) (24 October 1932 – 23 December 2002) was the founder and editor-in-chief of the Indian performing arts journal Sruti, after an earlier career as a diplomat.

Pattabhiraman's pen names included P Orr and Narayanan Pillai (a reference to his father's name).

== Early life ==
According to a Sruti magazine biography, Pattabhiraman was born in 1932 to V. Narayanan and Saradambal. He graduated from Vivekananda College with his B.A. in 1952, gained a Masters of Literature in 1955, and later earned a PhD in economics. He worked at the Indian Consulate and later United Nations in New York, returning to Madras in 1980.

== Work at Sruti ==
Pattabhiraman founded the magazine Sruti in 1983. His magazine, and his own articles within it, were noted for their willingness to tackle sensitive subjects in the Indian arts community. Following his death, the magazine was taken over by a group of his staffers, under new editor-in-chief K. V. Ramanathan.

== Other works ==
In 1999, Pattabhiraman founded the SAMADURI (Subbulakshmi Sadasivam Music and Dance Resources Institute) near Madras.
