= Ayya Nadar =

Indian entrepreneur

P. Ayya Nadar
- Born: 1905; Sivakasi, Madras Presidency, British India
- Died: 1982 (aged 76–77)
- Occupations: Founder of Anil Matches and Ayya Nadar Janaki Ammal College
- Spouse: Janaki Ammal
- Children: 5 sons and 4 daughters
- Parent(s): Palaniappa Nadar and Nagammal

P. Ayya Nadar (1905–1982) was an Indian entrepreneur from the southern city of Sivakasi in Tamil Nadu. He along with Shanmuga Nadar is credited for transforming the small village of Sivakasi into a thriving industrial town with firecracker, matchbox and printing industries. He was the founder of Anil brand (Squirrel) matches, which later turned into National Fireworks, after he died theNational Firewoks name changed to AYYAN FIREWORKS and Ayya Nadar Janaki Ammal College.

== Personal life ==
He was born in 1905 in Sivakasi to Palaniappa Nadar and Nagammal. He was married to Janaki Ammal with whom he has five sons and four daughters. He died in year 1982.

== Inception of match business ==
Ayya Nadar along with his cousin Shanmuga Nadar travelled to Calcutta in the year 1922 and stayed there for 8 months learning about the match industry. Upon their return to Sivakasi, they started the first handmade safety matches factory (National Matches) with machines imported from Germany.

The business eventually diversified into manufacturing of fireworks and yarn. Ayya Nadar later ventured into printing business and an educational institution. Ayya Nadar the first generation entrepreneur, in the year 1925 started National Fireworks in Sivakasi.

In 1926, they separated and established two separate match industries with Ayya Nadar's Anil (squirrel) brand competing with Shanmuga Nadar's kaka (crow) or Standard brand.

From 1984, Ayya Nadar four sons- A Grahadurai, A Vairaprakasam, A. Subash Chandra Bose & A Ramamurthy run their respective businesses. A Grahadurai & A Vairaprakasam partnered on their own company called Ayyan Fireworks that could not adopt the name National Fireworks Factory.

== Business expansion ==
P. Ayya Nadar founded Ayya Nadar Janaki Ammal College in 1963 offering courses in Arts and Sciences. The college is located in Sivakasi. From its beginning in 1923 till 1984, he headed the institution he founded. He has four sons- A Grahadurai (who died in 2007), A Vairaprakasam (who died in 2024), A Subash Chandra Bose (who died in 2019) and A Ramamurthy. Each of the sons have diversified businesses.

Ayya Nadar, along with Shanmuga Nadar, is credited with transforming the small poverty-stricken Sivakasi village into "Mini Japan of India" an industrial town with entrepreneurial people. R. G. Chandramogan, another entrepreneur and owner of Hatsun Agro, who happened to grow up in this town and witness this transformation said,

This revolution was brought to Sivakasi by Shanmuga Nadar and his cousin Ayya Nadar. The people of our town looked up to them as demigods because of the prosperity they brought to us.

== Sivakasi Municipality ==
He was the chairman of Sivakasi municipality between 1955 and 1963. Vaippar-Vembakkotai drinking water scheme with a dam in the north of the city was instituted during his tenure, which helped in the expansion of population and industries in the drought-prone town.
