= Bumi Armada =

Oilfield services company

Bumi Armada Berhad
- Company type: Public limited company
- Traded as: MYX: 5210
- Industry: Oilfield services
- Founded: 1995; 31 years ago
- Headquarters: Menara Perak; 24 Jalan Perak, Kuala Lumpur, Malaysia
- Key people: Tunku Ali Redhauddin Muhriz (Chairman); Gary Neal Christenson (CEO)
- Services: Floating production storage and offloading
- Revenue: ▼RM 2.13 billion(2023); RM 2.41 billion(2022)
- Net income: ▼RM 293 million(2023); RM 725 million(2022)
- Total assets: ▼RM 11.1 billion(2023); RM 11.73 billion(2022)
- Total equity: ▲RM 5.58 billion(2023); RM 5.1 billion(2022)
- Parent: Usaha Tegas Sdn Bhd (34.9%)
- Website: www.bumiarmada.com

Bumi Armada Berhad is an oilfield services company which provides marine transportation, engineering and maintenance services to the offshore oil and gas industry. It is based in Kuala Lumpur, Malaysia, and has operations in Southeast Asia, South Asia, West Africa, Central Africa, Europe, South America and the Caspian Sea region. It is the world's fifth largest floating production storage and offloading (FPSO) provider with six vessels.

Bumi Armada's operations are divided into two businesses: Floating Production & Operations (FPO) and Offshore Marine Services (OMS), (encompassing Offshore Support Vessels (OSV) and the Subsea Construction (SC) services).

The company was incorporated as a public limited company in 1995 and it is part of Ananda Krishnan's Usaha Tegas group. Its shares are listed on the Main Market of Bursa Malaysia Securities Berhad.

== History ==
Bumi Armada was incorporated in 1995 and first went public in 1997. It became the first Malaysian company to own and operate a floating production storage and offloading (FPSO) vessel with the commissioning of Armada Perkasa in 1997. Armada Perkasa was originally a 1975 Panamax-sized tanker with a storage capacity of 360,000 barrels of crude oil which was converted to service the Bunga Kekwa field.

It subsequently acquired five more FPSOs—Armada Perdana (2009) (ex Biruința oil tanker), Armada TGT1 (2011), Armada Sterling (2012), Armada Claire (2014), and Armada Sterling II (2014).

It was acquired by Ananda Krishnan in 2002 and taken private the following year. In 2011, the company was re-listed in Malaysia's biggest initial public offering of that year, raising RM2.66 billion (US$889 million).

== Operations ==
=== Floating production storage and offloading ===
Bumi Armada operates six FPSOs while four are in the process of being commissioned as of August 2015.

Armada Perkasa has been operating in the Okoro-Setu field in Nigeria since 2008 for Afren and has lifted over 32 million barrels of oil as of 2013. It was previously deployed in the Bunga Kekwa field off the coast of Malaysia and Vietnam, and in the Baram field, off Sarawak.

Armada Perdana was deployed in the Oyo field in Nigeria, currently operated by CAMAC Energy, in 2008. Armada TGT1 was deployed in the Te Giac Trang field in Vietnam, operated by Hoang Long Joint Operating Company (HLJOC), in 2011. Bumi Armada's fourth vessel, the Armada Sterling, was deployed in the D1 field, off Mumbai, for Oil and Natural Gas Corporation (ONGC) in 2012. The fifth vessel, Armada Claire, was deployed in Australia's north-western Balnaves field, operated in Apache, in 2014. The Armada Sterling II was deployed in the C-7 field off Mumbai for ONGC in 2015.

The Armada Kraken is expected to be deployed in the North Sea Kraken field operated by EnQuest.

Bumi Armada has also secured contracts with Husky-CNOOC in the Madura BD field in Indonesia, Eni in the Block 15/06, East Hub field off Angola, and ElectroGas Malta in Malta.

=== Floating Gas Solutions (FLNG, FSRU/FSU) ===
The award of the Malta LNG FSU project in April 2015 marks the entry of Bumi Armada in the floating LNG segment. The project consists in the conversion of a first generation MOSS carrier of 125,000m3 storage capacity into a Floating Storage Unit to be permanently moored by a jetty near the Delimara power station. The unit will deliver LNG on a continuous basis, without dry-docking interruption and during the entire project life of 18 years, to an onshore regasification plant feeding natural gas to the 400 MW base load power station.

Considering the relatively small gas send out required for a 400 MW power plant, the FSU conversion was found to be the most economical solution whilst ensuring the high degree of availability and reliability demanded by the operation of a base load plant.

=== Others ===
Bumi Armada's Offshore Support Vessel (OSV) unit has more than 40 vessels operating in various continents. The vessels include anchor handling towing support vessels, safety standby vessels, utility vessels, and accommodation workboats/work barges.
