= MTV Youth Icon of the Year =

Annual award presented by MTV India

MTV India's Youth Icon of the year is an annual award presented by MTV India, a TV channel. It was first presented in 2003. It is determined by popular votes.

== Recipients ==
The recipients of the awards are:

- 2003 : Anil Ambani (Indian Industrialist)
- 2004 : Rahul Dravid (Indian Cricketer)
- 2005 : Shahrukh Khan (Indian Actor) )
- 2006 : Mahendra Singh Dhoni (Indian Cricketer)
- 2007 : Orkut (A community website by Google)
- 2008 : Award was given to eight persons

1. Sarathbabu (BITS-Pilani and IIM-A passout, Food King catering business)
2. Rahul Mishra (Fashion designer from Dalhousie (Himachal Pradesh))
3. MC Mary Kom (Boxing, recipient of Padma Shri and Arjun Award)
4. Ishita Khanna (Entrepreneur, Founder and Director of Ecosphere)
5. Nitish Mishra (Minister of state for disaster management, Bihar, India)
6. Blaaze (Singer)
7. Mangesh Hadawale (Director of Marathi film 'Tingya')
