= Ananda Krishnan =

Malaysian entrepreneur (1938–2024)

Tatparanandam Ananda Krishnan
- தத்பராநந்தம் ஆநந்தகிருஷ்ணன்
- Born: 1 April 1938; Brickfields, Kuala Lumpur, Selangor, British Malaya
- Died: 28 November 2024 (aged 86); Swiss Alps, Switzerland
- Citizenship: Malaysia
- Education: University of Melbourne (BA); Harvard Business School (MBA)
- Occupation: Entrepreneur
- Title: Founder and chairperson of Usaha Tegas; Founder of Astro Malaysia Holdings; Founder of Yu Cai Foundation (YCF)
- Children: 3

Tatparanandam Ananda Krishnan (Tamil: தத்பராநந்தம் ஆநந்தகிருஷ்ணன்; 1 April 1938 – 28 November 2024), also known by the initialism A. K., was a Malaysian entrepreneur who was a founder and chairperson of Usaha Tegas and founder of Yu Cai Foundation (YCF).

At the time of his death, he was estimated to have a net worth of US$5.1 billion according to Forbes making him the 671th wealthiest person in the world and 3rd richest in Malaysia. Ananda Krishnan shunned public exposure and was known to maintain a low profile for a person of his stature.

== Early life and education ==
Ananda Krishnan was born on 1 April 1938 in Brickfields, Kuala Lumpur to Tamil parents and has his roots in Jaffna, Sri Lanka. He studied at Vivekananda Tamil School in Brickfields and furthered his studies at Victoria Institution, Kuala Lumpur. Later, as a Colombo Plan scholar, he attended the University of Melbourne, Australia for his B.A. (Honours) degree majoring in political science. During that time, he boarded in the Melbourne suburb of Hawthorn. Following that, Krishnan obtained a Master of Business Administration from Harvard Business School, graduating in 1964.

Krishnan was a follower of Buddhism and had three children, two daughters and a son. His only son, Ven Ajahn Siripanyo is a Theravada Buddhist monk.

Contrary to many misconceptions, Ananda Krishnan was neither awarded any federal nor honorific titles.

== Career ==
Krishnan's first entrepreneurial venture was a Malaysian consultancy MAI Holdings Sdn Bhd. He set up Exoil Trading, which went on to purchase oil drilling concessions in various countries. Later, he moved into gambling (in Malaysia). In the early part of the 1990s, he started diversifying into the multimedia arena.

He had business interests in media (Astro), satellite (MEASAT), oil and gas (Bumi Armada, Pexco), telecommunications (Maxis, Sri Lanka Telecom). He owned stakes in Tanjong Public Limited Company, an investment holding company with subsidiaries involved in leisure (TGV Cinemas) and property (67% Maxis Tower etc.).

Krishnan first came to prominence by helping to organise the Live Aid concert with Bob Geldof in the mid-1980s. In the early 1990s, he began building a multimedia empire that now includes two telecommunication companies—Maxis Communications, MEASAT Broadcast Network Systems and SES World Skies—and has three communication satellites circumnavigating the Earth.

He effected the purchase of 46% of Maxis Communications, the country's largest cellular phone company, from América Móvil, AT&T Corporation, British Telecom, Belgacom, Ooredoo, Orange S.A. and Royal KPN N.V. for $1,180 million—raising his stake to 70%. Maxis has more than ten million subscribers, with around 40% market share in Malaysia. He also owned a stake in Sri Lanka Telecom.

In an agreement between Astro and India's Sun Network, Krishnan planned to produce TV channels which cater to the Indian market, especially Tamil people in countries such as US, Western Europe and the Middle East. He also planned to offer TV services featuring Web-based interactivity. Ananda Krishnan owned stakes in TVB.com and the Shaw Brothers movie archives.

== Death ==
Krishnan died of natural causes in Swiss Alps on 28 November 2024 at the age of 86.

== Philanthropy ==
Ananda Krishnan donated to education, the arts, sports and humanitarian causes in Malaysia through his company Usaha Tegas, and its subsidiaries.

In 2003, Krishnan's Usaha Tegas launched the Harapan Nusantara education fund. Since 2004 the fund has sponsored 100 students a year to attend special programs at local private universities that collaborate with foreign universities. In the same year the company also started the Yu Cai Education Foundation with a grant of $6.6 million to help ethnic Chinese groups.

In 2006, Ananda Krishnan's media company Astro introduced its scholarship program, promising to devote an annual RM2 million to support promising Malaysian undergraduate and graduate students studying media and broadcasting.

In 2008, he contributed to the opening of the Montfort Girls Centre to help orphaned and underprivileged girls develop their vocational skills.

In 2010, Krishnan was featured on the Forbes list of 48 Heroes of Philanthropy.

In January 2015, Ananda Krishnan and the Usaha Tegas Group launched the Yu Cai Foundation (YCF). YCF provides student scholarships for Mandarin-based schools and grants to educational institutions which promote the study of vernacular languages, especially Mandarin and English.

== See also ==
- List of Tamil businesspeople
