= Brocks Fireworks =

Manufacturer of fireworks

Brocks Fireworks Limited
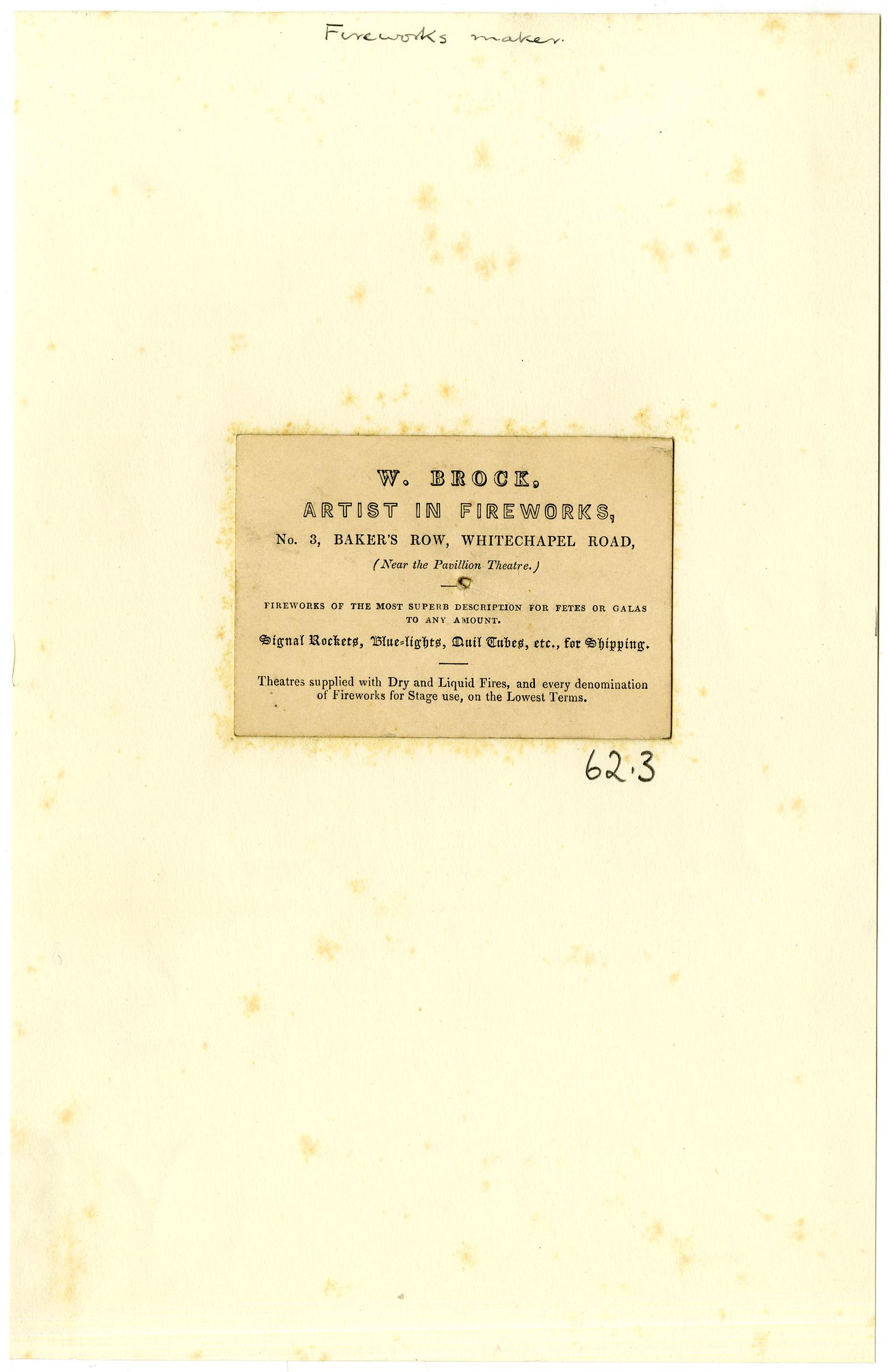
- Company type: Limited company
- Founded: 1698; 327 years ago in Islington, London
- Founder: John Brock
- Headquarters: London
- Products: Pyrotechnics
- Website: brocksfireworks.com

Brock's Fireworks Ltd is a manufacturer of fireworks, founded in London and subsequently based in Hemel Hempstead, Dumfriesshire and Norfolk.

== History ==
Brock's was founded in 1698 in Islington by John Brock, and is the oldest British firework manufacturer. John Brock died on 5 November 1720 aged 43 and is buried at St James's Church, Clerkenwell, London. In 1825 the factory was located in a residential area in Baker's Row (now Vallance Road), Whitechapel, London: it was destroyed when a boy who was ramming gunpowder into a firework accidentally created a spark which ignited it, and threw it aside as he ran out in fright. Fifty pounds of gunpowder and a large amount of saltpetre exploded immediately, blowing the roof off, setting fire to the building, and smashing every pane of glass in most of the adjoining streets.

The company established a presence in south London, in South Norwood and Sutton and developed an association with the Crystal Palace, devising public displays (known as "Brock's Benefits"), from 1826, and adopting "Crystal Palace" as a brand name. In 1868, the company built a firework "manufactory" in Nunhead, south-east London, not far from where The Pyrotechnists Arms still exists. It was then referred to as C. T. Brock & Co, "Crystal Palace" Fireworks. Brock Street, was built on a closed section of nearby Tappesfield Road, commemorating the factory.

The 1887 edition and several subsequent editions of Whitaker's Almanack included advertisements for Brock's: the company provided fireworks for the Crystal Palace company, the UK War Office, the Government of India and other bodies. Henry Brock died on 4 October 1901 at age 53, and was buried at Holy Trinity Church, Leverstock Green.

The company moved to Hemel Hempstead in the early 1930s. In the 1930s, Brock's built homes and a sports club. (Note: The former sports club site is now the ground of Hemel Hempstead Football Club.) for its workers near to its 207-acre (0.84 km^{2}) site on the north eastern side of Hemel Hempstead. The street names (Ranelagh Road and Vauxhall Road) reflected earlier associations with the 18th-century London Pleasure Gardens where Brock's was contracted to display fireworks. During the Second World War the company made the famous "target markers" (Note: The target markers were pyrotechnics which were set to burst at a certain height above the ground, scattering up to 60 small candles.) used by the RAF's Pathfinder Force (PFF). These guided the bombers so they could drop their ordnance more accurately.

In August of 1946, several buildings at the Hemel Hempstead site were damaged and destroyed in a fire and explosion. The fire had broken out in the chemical stores and quickly spread to other buildings. According to a newspaper report at the time "there was a terrific explosion which was heard ten miles way". Fire-fighters were led by Alan Brock, a director, and three people were injured.

In the early 1970s, the company moved manufacturing from Hemel Hempstead to Sanquhar, Scotland. This followed the sale of the freehold in 1971 to Fairview Estates. The property was to be sold in lots of 34 acres and was expected to fetch a total of £3.5 million. Also in the 1970s, the company opened an additional factory at Swaffham in Norfolk. Brock's Fireworks was bought by Standard Fireworks in 1988, and Standard Fireworks were bought by China-based Black Cat Fireworks, bringing an end to production in the UK.
