= Muthu Nilavan =

Tamil scholar and poet

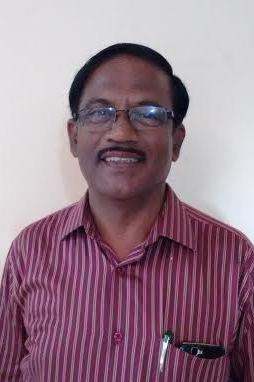
Muthu Nilavan

Muthu Nilavan (முத்துநிலவன்) also known as Muthu Baskaran, from Pudukottai, is a Tamil scholar and poet of Tamil Nadu. He has worked as a teacher for more than three decades.

== Life ==
He is an orator, and as mediator, he has participated in many talk shows and debates among Tamil scholars, students, and the public.

== Books ==
- New Traditions (Tamil: புதிய மரபுகள், கவிதைத்தொகுப்பு), அன்னம் பதிப்பகம், 2ஆம் பதிப்பு, 2014
- Literatures of 20th century: A critical review (Tamil: 20ஆம் நூற்றாண்டு இலக்கியவாதிகள், (திறனாய்வு), 1995
- Yesterday English and Today Tamil: Compilation of articles (Tamil: நேற்று ஆங்கிலம் இன்று தமிழ் (கட்டுரைத்தொகுப்பு), 2003
- Let us write and speak in proper Tamil without mistakes (Tamil: நல்ல தமிழில் பிழையின்றி எழுதுவோம் பேசுவோம்), 2008
- Kamban Tamil and Computer Tamil (Tamil: கம்பன் தமிழும் கணினித்தமிழும்), 2014
- My beloved daughter, you need not get the first rank (Tamil: முதல் மதிப்பெண் எடுக்கவேண்டாம் மகளே), அகரம், தஞ்சாவூர், 2015
