= MEASAT Satellite Systems =

Malaysian Satellite Service System

MEASAT Satellite Systems Sdn. Bhd.
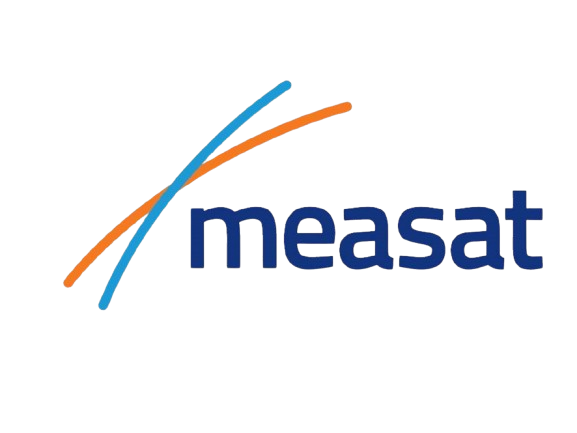
- Formerly: Binariang Satellite Systems Sdn. Bhd.
- Type: Private limited company
- Industry: Satellite communication
- Founded: 1992
- Founder: Ananda Krishnan
- Headquarters: Cyberjaya, Malaysia
- Key people: Shaharul Rezza Hassan (Chairman)
- Services: Broadcasting; Telecommunications
- Parent: MEASAT Global Berhad
- Website: www.measat.com

MEASAT Satellite Systems Sdn. Bhd. (formerly Binariang Satellite Systems Sdn. Bhd.) is a Malaysian communications satellite operator that owns and operates the MEASAT (Malaysia East Asia Satellite) and AFRICASAT spacecraft. The company provides satellite services to leading Malaysian broadcasters, Direct-To-Home (DTH) platforms, and telecom operators. With capacity across six communication satellites, the company provides satellite services to over 150 countries.

Measat's CONNECTme (high-speed satellite broadband service) at 9th Bengaluru Space Expo 2026, BIEC

== History ==
Technicians at Boeing's Space and Intelligence Systems satellite manufacturing facility in El Segundo, California, prepare the MEASAT-3 communications satellite

In 1993, Malaysia's Prime Minister, Dr. Mahathir Mohamad, called for the end of the Malaysian government's monopoly on communications services. He believed that the creation of privately owned companies could better serve Malaysia's communications needs in the decades ahead. One result of Mahathir's 1993 "Malaysia Plan" was the creation of the Binariang Sdn. Bhd. company by Malaysian tycoon Ananda Krishnan, which was given the charter to develop Malaysia's first satellite communications system. In 1994, Binariang signed a contract with Hughes Space and Communications Company (now Boeing Satellite Systems) for two Model 376 satellites. The project was named the "Malaysia East Asia Satellite" program, or "MEASAT" for short. The satellites opened the door to reliable telephone and data transmission services to all of Malaysia, helping to strengthen the unity between the peninsula and the island portions of the nation. The satellites also contributed greatly to the rapid growth of computer networking in Malaysia, as well as the creation of a new direct-to-home (DTH) satellite television service, called "Astro".

Since the launch of MEASAT-1 and MEASAT-2 in 1996, the company has expanded its fleet to across six (6) geostationary satellites designed and built by Boeing Satellite Systems, Orbital Sciences Corporation, Loral Space & Communications, and Airbus Defence and Space.

== MEASAT-1 (AFRICASAT-1) and MEASAT-2 ==
Image of MEASAT-1 orbiting over Malaysia

As advanced Model 376 spacecraft, the MEASAT-1 and -2 satellites have three enhancements over the standard model. They were the first in the 376 series to be fitted with gallium arsenide solar cells, which deliver 40 percent more payload power as compared to their silicon predecessors. They were also the first Model 376s to use lightweight, high-gain shaped antenna. The satellites also used a more efficient bipropellant system for stationkeeping and attitude control maneuvers.

Both MEASAT-1 & 2 satellites were launched on Ariane rockets from Centre Spatial Guyanais at Kourou in French Guiana. MEASAT-1 was launched in January 1996 and MEASAT-2 was launched in November 1996. MEASAT-1 was located in a geostationary orbit at 91.5 degrees East, and MEASAT-2 was located in a geostationary orbit at 148 degrees East. The contract with Hughes also called for the installation and testing of equipment for a satellite control station on Langkawi Island, and training of Malaysian spacecraft controllers.

MEASAT 1 had five high-power transponders in Ku band for the direct-to-user service, powered by 112-watt traveling-wave tube amplifiers. The regional service to Malaysia was provided on 12 transponders in C band, using 12-watt solid state amplifiers. MEASAT-2 had 11 active transponders in Ku band. Eight of these use 95-watt traveling-wave amplifiers, and three have 62 watts. MEASAT-2 also had six active transponders in C band, powered by 12-watt solid-state amplifiers.

In the latter part of 2009, MEASAT-1 was still functioning reliably beyond its planned 12 year life. With help from Boeing Satellite Systems, MEASAT drift relocated MEASAT-1 from its 91.5°E orbital location, across the Indian Ocean to provide service to the African continent from 46°E. In January 2010, MEASAT renamed MEASAT-1 as "AFRICASAT-1". The satellite was de-orbited and sent to a 'graveyard' orbit in April 2013 once it reached its end-of-life.

MEASAT-1 / AFRICASAT-1
Orbital Location	91.5°East (0°N 91.5°E)
Geographic Coverage	South East Asia, northern Australia and Guam
Launch Year	1996
Present Status	De-orbited
Type of Satellite	Boeing 376 HP
Launch vehicle	Ariane 4
Design Lifetime	12 years
SSPA Power	12 Watts
Transponder Bandwidth	12×36 MHz
Channel Polarization	Linear

MEASAT-2
Orbital Location	148°East (0°N 148°E)
Geographic Coverage	Asia Pacific and Hawaii
Launch Year	1996
Present Status	De-orbited
Type of Satellite	Boeing 376 HP
Launch vehicle	Ariane 4
Design Lifetime	12 years
SSPA Power	12 Watts
Transponder Bandwidth	6×72 MHz (C-band), 6x48 MHz (Ku-band)
Channel Polarization	Linear

== MEASAT-3 ==
Image of MEASAT-3 orbiting over Malaysia

MEASAT-3 is a Boeing 601 HP spacecraft. It was launched on 12 December 2006 from Russia's Baikonur Cosmodrome in Kazakhstan.

On 21 June 2021, MEASAT-3 had experienced an unidentified problem. MEASAT said on 6 August 2021 that it has chosen to deorbit the satellite.

== MEASAT-3a ==
MEASAT-3a was constructed by Orbital Sciences Corporation under their Star-2 platform. It was launched on 21 June 2009 from the Baikonur Cosmodrome in Kazakhstan.

== MEASAT-3b ==
MEASAT-3b was constructed by Airbus Defence and Space. It was launched on 12 September 2014 MYT from Centre Spatial Guyanais in French Guiana.

== MEASAT-3d ==
MEASAT-3d was constructed by Airbus Defence and Space. It was launched on 23 June 2022 along with a satellite made by NSIL and Tata Play, GSAT-24 onboard Ariane 5 ECA+ flight VA257 from ELA-3, Centre Spatial Guyanais.
