= ESentral =

E-book store of Malaysia

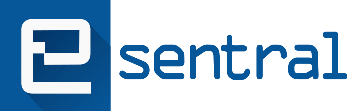
eSentral's logo

eSentral or e-Sentral is a Malaysian e-Book store for South East Asian market. It was first introduced in October 2011 by two entrepreneurs, Faiz Al-Shahab, and Syed Irfan, as a private funded initiative, and received Series A funding from a Malaysian venture capital firm late 2012. eSentral is operated by a private limited company, Xentral Methods. eSentral, a derivation of the word "sentral", meaning central or focal point in Malay, indicates a digital marketplace for contents delivered via bandwidth.

Once registered with the website, users can access books using EPUB standards (rather than PDF) on their computer, tablet or smartphone.

eSentral was the first eBook portal in South East Asia to operate with Digital Rights Management via its own proprietary encryption system.

eSentral has grown to be the biggest repository of eBooks in South East Asia.

eSentral also became the first company to introduce bluetooth beacon technology in distributing eBooks for micro-location premises. This was first demonstrated in Kuala Lumpur International Airport in September 2015.
