= Sarathbabu Elumalai =

Indian entrepreneur, social worker, and politician

- Born: 10 November 1979 (age 46); Chennai, Tamil Nadu, India
- Education: BITS Pilani; IIM Ahmedabad
- Occupations: CEO of FoodKing, Politician
- Political party: Makkal Needhi Maiam
- Spouse: Nil
- Parent(s): Elumalai.P; E. Deeparamani

Sarathbabu Elumalai is an Indian entrepreneur, social worker and politician. He is the founder and CEO of FoodKing.

== Early life and education ==
Sarathbabu was born in Madipakkam, a suburb of Chennai, Tamil Nadu, India. He had four siblings and the family was supported by his mother Deepa Ramani, an Anganwadi worker. She also did various other jobs like making idlis, which Sarathbabu used to sell before going to school.

Sarath did his schooling at Kings matriculation school. He completed his bachelor's degree at Birla Institute of Technology and Science, Pilani. After completing his graduation, he worked for three years with Polaris. He did his master's degree in business administration from Indian Institute of Management Ahmedabad.

== Career ==
After completing his management education, Sarathbabu worked for 2 years. In 2006, he started Food King with a seed capital of ₹2,000 (US$21) for delivering food to institutions. As of 2011, it operates in 6 locations in India with an annual turnover of ₹80 million (US$830,000).

=== Politics ===
Sarathbabu contested as an independent candidate from the Chennai South constituency during the 2009 Lok Sabha Elections and managed to secure over 15,000 votes. In 2010, he joined Desiya Murpokku Dravida Kazhagam, a regional political party, but quit the party later. In the 2011 Tamil Nadu assembly elections, he contested again as an independent candidate from the Velachery constituency. He lost the elections, ending up third with 7,472 votes. In 2011, Sarathbabu contested for the post of Mayor of Chennai. He is contesting as Kamal Haasan's Makkal Needhi Maiam party's candidate in Alandur (state assembly constituency) in upcoming 2021 Tamil Nadu Legislative Assembly election.

== Personal life ==
In 2010, Sarath started the Hunger Free India, an initiative to feed poor people. He launched an initiative to observe 10 October as Hunger Free Day.

== Awards and recognition ==
- Pepsi MTV Youth icon (2008)
- Example to Youth Award (2008)
- RITZ Chennai Youth Icon (2010)
- CNN-IBN Award for Young Indian Leader (2011)
- Honorary Rotarian
- Honorary Alumnus, XLRI Jamshedpur
