= V. R. M. Letchumanan Chettiar =

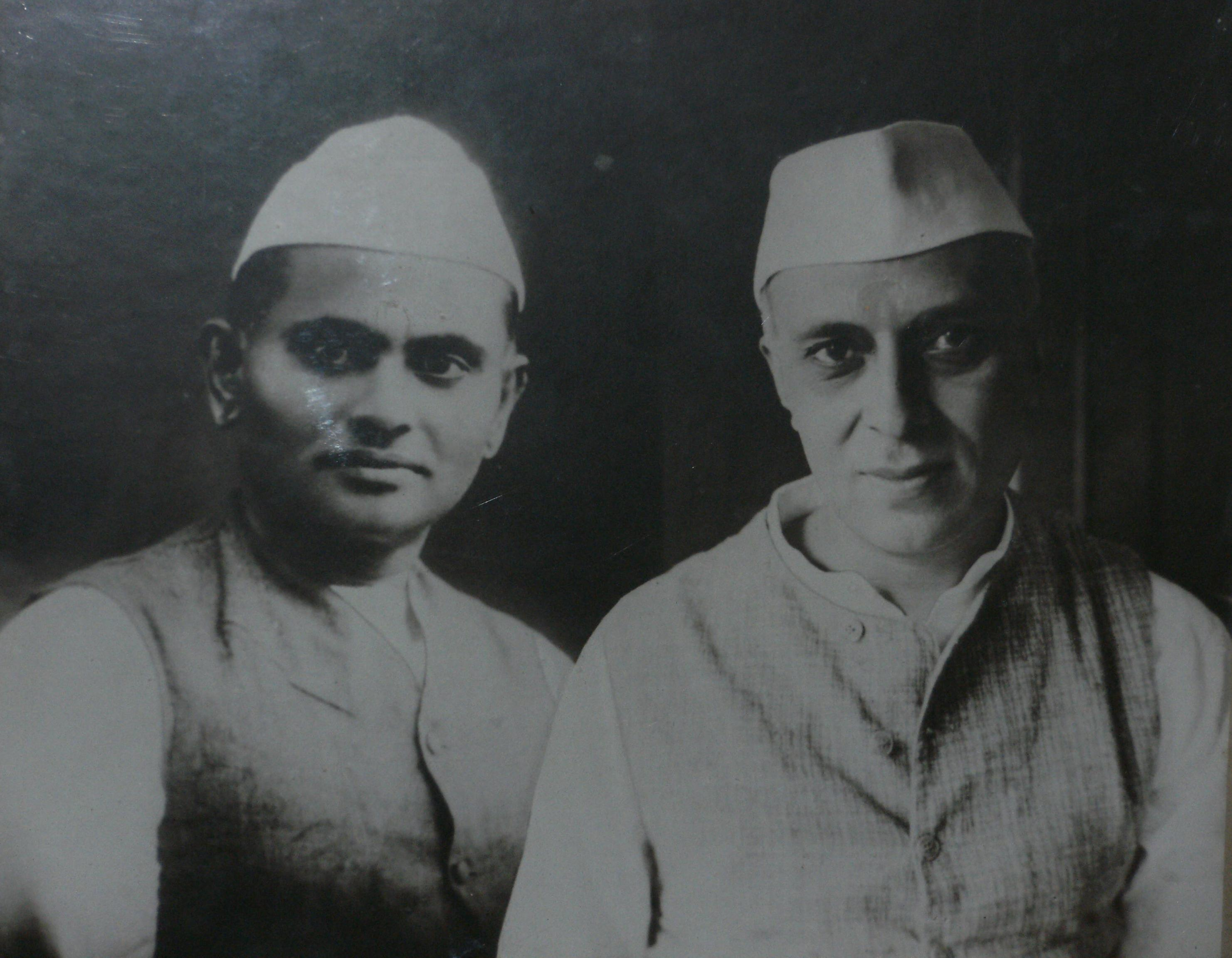
Letchumanan Chettiar with Pandit Jawaharlal Nehru

V.Rm. Letchumanan Chettiar (1897–1950) was an Indian businessman and politician from Ceylon.

== History ==
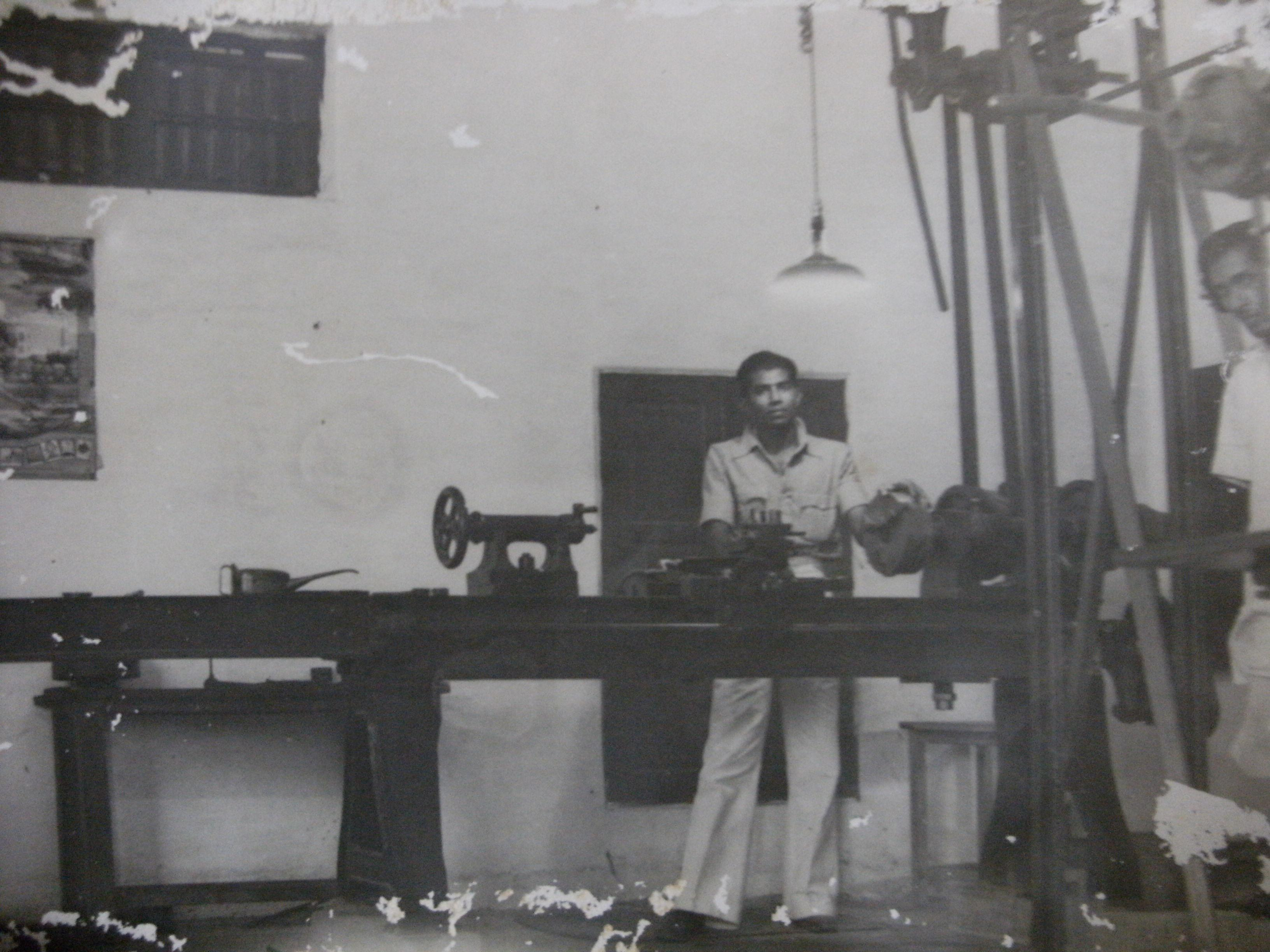
Chettiar's son Manickam, as an apprentice at Pico Garage

Chettiar was born in Valayapatti, Princely state of Pudukottai. He grew bored with managing his family banking business, and eventually moved to Ceylon to explore new business ventures. With immense struggle started transport business named VRMVA Traders. And the other ventures included a Woodstock tea estates, Pudukottai Power Supply Unit, Namanasamudra Textiles, Pico (Pudukottai Industrial Corporation) Garage, and an agricultural research farm in Letchmanapuram, Pudukottai district.

Chettiar joined the Indian congress in 1936. Pandit Jawahalal Nehru observing Chettiars influence over in Ceylon, made him the first president of Ceylon Indian Congress on 25 July 1939. Chettiar served as its president, with H.M. Aziz as the secretary, for two years. Then moved back to India for contesting the Pudukottai seat in the Madras State assembly election. He had been a twice member of that electorate earlier, and won the 1939 August election with a convincing majority.

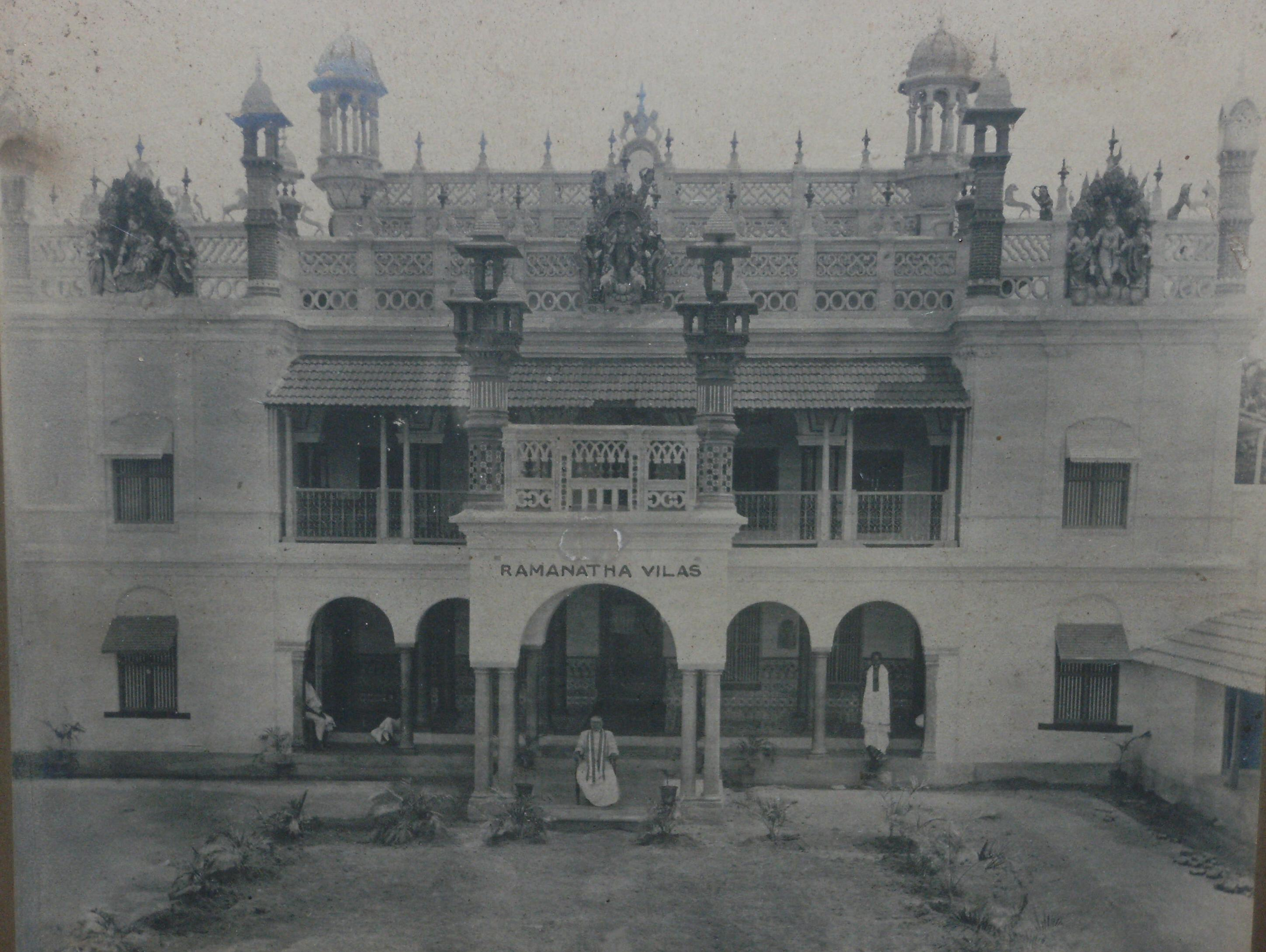
Chettiar's house in Valayapatti

Chettiar also served as an official translator for the Thondaimaan family, henceforth he was called as "English Lena" by the kings of Pudukottai.
