= Muthu Hospital =

Geography
- Location: Madurai, Tamil Nadu, India

History
- Founded: 1953; 73 years ago

Links
- Website: www.muthuhospital.in
- Lists: Hospitals in India

Muthu Hospital is an orthopedic and trauma care hospital in the city of Madurai in Madurai district in the state of Tamil Nadu, in southeastern India. The hospital was founded in 1953 and is the oldest orthopedic hospital in the district.

Muthu Hospital was inaugurated on 1953 by K. Kamaraj, who was then Chief Minister of Tamil Nadu. Dr. K.A. Ramalingam FRCS (London), founder chairman of the hospital, was the first orthopedic surgeon in Madurai district. Dr. K.A. Ramalingam was also a lecturer in orthopedics at Madurai Medical College and fellow of the British Orthopaedic Association. Founder president of Madurai Orthopedic Club. Founder secretary Rotary Club of Madurai East (1965) and Madurai Metro (1994).
