= Shanmuga Nadar =

Indian entrepreneur

Shanmuga Nadar (1903–1969) was an Indian entrepreneur from the southern city of Sivakasi in Tamil Nadu. He along with his cousin Ayya Nadar is credited for transforming the small village of Sivakasi into a thriving industrial town. He was the founder of Kakka (or Kaliswari) firework industry. He was the chairman of Sivakasi municipality between 1952 and 1955. In 1922, he along with Ayya Nadar went to Calcutta to learn matchmaking and opened industries in Sivakasi upon their return.
