= Ayya Nadar Janaki Ammal College =

College in Tamil Nadu, India

- Other name: ANJA College
- Motto: Pro Deo et Patria (Latin)
- Motto in English: For God and Country
- Type: Public
- Established: 1963
- Academic affiliations: Madurai Kamaraj University Madurai
- Endowment: Tamil Nadu State Government support
- Academic staff: 180
- Administrative staff: 91
- Students: 3315
- Undergraduates: 2360
- Postgraduates: 955
- Doctoral students: 71
- Location: Sivakasi, Tamil Nadu, India; 9.4726°N 77.7514°E
- Campus: Rural
- Colours: White & blue
- Website: anjaconline.org

Ayya Nadar Janaki Ammal College (ANJAC) is an autonomous college in Sivakasi, in the Indian state of Tamil Nadu, affiliated to Madurai Kamaraj University, Madurai recognized as a 'College of Excellence' by the University Grants Commission.

The college was established with financial support from two charitable trusts: Janaki Ammal Ayya Nadar Trust and P. IYA Nadar Charitable Trust. ANJAC began its operations in 1963, initially offering only a Pre-University program. Today, it offers 18 undergraduate, 16 postgraduate, 12 certificate, 6 postgraduate diploma, 2 advanced diploma, 10 M.Phil., and 7 Ph.D. programs in Science, Arts, and Commerce faculties, with an intake of 2,900 students and research scholars. The college is ranked 63rd among colleges in India by the National Institutional Ranking Framework (NIRF) in 2024.

== History ==
The college was founded in 1963 by RV Sir during the early phase of educational reforms and modernization of the education system in Tamil Nadu, which were implemented by K Kamaraj during his tenure as Chief Minister of the state.

Year	Academic transformations
1963	Old Campus – affiliated to the University of Madras
1966	Shifted to the new campus – affiliated to the Madurai Kamaraj University
1975	Introduction of the semester pattern of education
1979	Pre-University courses discontinued
1987	Conferred of Autonomous status
1997	Introduction of Choice Based Credit System (CBCS) for P.G. Courses
1997	Approval of MCA course by All India Council for Technical Education(AICTE), New Delhi
1998	Became co-educational at the PG level
1999	Accredited with FIVE STAR status by NAAC, Bangalore
2003	Introduction of Choice Based Credit System (CBCS) for UG courses
2004	Became co-educational at the UG level
2004	Designated as a College with Potential for excellence by UGC
2006	Reaccredited with A+ Grade college rating by NAAC, Bangalore

== Suicide of Solairani ==
Solairani,a 19 year old female student committed suicide after being berated and pressured by the investigative committee for posting a picture of her and her boyfriend in her private instagram story. Protests regarding this in the college happened with organizing of Student federation of india.

== Campus ==
The college campus is located in a 175 acres along the Sivakasi – Srivilliputtur road, five kilometers away from Sivakasi.

== Organization ==
The college administration is primarily governed by the managing committee, which includes members of the Ayya and Janaki Ammal Trust, the principal and university representatives. Autonomous functionaries and the college council are responsible for the day-to-day activities of the academic programs.

The two charitable Trusts, namely Janaki Ammal Ayya Nadar Trust and P. Iya Nadar Trust, manage the college and extend financial support. On average, they contribute Rs. 50 lakhs annually. In 2004–2005 the contribution was Rs.88 lakhs for promoting various activities in the college.

As an Autonomous college, the management adheres to decentralized governing practices and follows a democratic approach. The entire faculty is involved in decision-making at all levels. Faculty members contribute their expertise to major policy-making bodies such as the governing council and college committee, alongside the managing committee members, the Principal, university and government representatives. The Heads of Departments constitute the college council, with the Principal serving as the president. The council meets once a month. The Academic Council handles curriculum design, student admissions, and co-curricular and extracurricular activities. The College Council focuses on day-to-day administration and related matters. Departments have autonomy in decision-making at their level, and decisions are communicated to the management. The practice of bottom-up communication is followed.

The college operates with a focus on its goals, vision, and mission, and has an organizational structure that effectively coordinates both academic and administrative planning. Being an autonomous institution, it has its own Board of Studies to prepare syllabi and a panel of examiners. The Finance Committee manages capital expenditure and annual accounts. The Planning and Evaluation Committee oversees campus discipline, teaching and learning, and welfare activities. The Awards Committee reviews examination results, maintains records, and forwards mark sheets and diplomas to the concerned authorities.

The college has coordinators for the Curriculum Development Cell, Academic Affairs, and Student Services. There are separate controllers of examinations for UG and PG courses who conduct exams, set fees, schedule dates, administer terminal exams, and announce results.

Under its organizational structure, ANJAC has established an Internal Quality Assurance Cell (IQAC). The primary task of IQAC is to develop a system for conscious, consistent, and catalytic improvement in institutional performance. It serves as a facilitative and participative unit of the institution, critically reviewing and assessing the performance of all departmental committees and cells. IQAC met four times during 2004–2005.

Since the college is aided by the government, it follows the guidelines set by the Government of Tamil Nadu, the university, and the U.G.C. A sufficient number of faculty members are available in all departments, and the college is equipped with computers and Internet facilities for office automation.

The main sources of finance are: grant-in-aid from the Tamil Nadu Government, the Central Government, student fees, contributions by the management, U.G.C. assistance, self-financing courses, and other funding agencies.

== Academics ==
=== Curriculum ===
The college offers 17 subjects across 70 program combinations. Over the last five years, 16 new UG/PG courses, all under the self-funded category, have been introduced, including 6 IT-based courses. Additionally, a computer foundation program is offered to all non-computer students. Degree programs include inbuilt vocational modules, and newly started PG programs facilitate vertical mobility. This multidimensional development of the curriculum is beneficial to learners.

Student feedback is obtained and processed formally. The curriculum revision process considers various inputs, including students' evaluations of programs, opinions from the Curriculum Development Cell, findings from departmental meetings, feedback from subject experts, alumni, and prospective employers.

Curriculum reviews are conducted annually, with updates and minor changes made on a continuous basis. Major revisions occur once every three years for PG programs and once every four years for UG programs.

=== Admission ===
Students are admitted to the various UG courses based on a merit-cum-reservation policy, while 25% of the weightage for PG course admissions is given to entrance test scores. All seats in all courses are filled due to high demand.

=== Degrees ===
The academic programs offered cover most science and humanities streams. Three-year undergraduate and two-year postgraduate programs are available in various disciplines. M.Phil. and Ph.D. degrees are awarded as part of the research program, with a relatively higher number in the Tamil discipline.

An undergraduate Bachelor's program in Physical Education is offered for those interested in training to become professionals in sports.

==== Exams ====
Learners are assessed through continuous internal assessment (CIA) and terminal examinations. Double valuation of answer scripts is implemented for both UG and PG programs. For PG programs, internal and external assessments each carry 50% weightage. The internal assessment components include tests (30 marks), quizzes (5 marks), assignments (5 marks), and seminars (10 marks). For UG programs, internal assessment carries a 40% weightage. Complete transparency is maintained in the internal evaluation process.

To build confidence in the evaluation system, valued answer scripts are returned to students for their scrutiny, and they are provided with an opportunity to raise any grievances. In case of disputes, a provision for revaluation is available. Examination conduct and valuation are centralized.

== Research ==
The research cell established in the college fosters and sustains a research culture. Faculty members are motivated by providing a doctoral allowance of Rs. 200 per month. Monetary assistance is also offered for publications in national and international journals, as well as for thesis preparation. Grants received from funding agencies are appreciated and rewarded. Teachers are encouraged to participate in seminars and present papers. Over the last five years, 24 teachers have received Ph.Ds.

Out of 144 faculty members, 44 hold Ph.D. degrees. Additionally, 17 research scholars have received their Ph.D. during the last five years. The college is currently managing three major research projects funded by DST and DBT, with a total outlay of Rs. 66.16 lakhs. Another ongoing research project funded by the Management is worth Rs. 7 lakhs. Five major projects have been completed in the last five years. Of the 16 minor research projects sanctioned by the UGC during the same period, two are yet to be completed. The UGC has sanctioned Rs. 100 lakhs under the CPE scheme.

The presence of a research culture on campus builds confidence among faculty and students in independent inquiry. The college publishes a bi-annual scientific journal, ANJAC Journal of Science. Over the last five years, faculty members have published 64 papers in international journals, 215 papers in national journals, and 535 papers have been abstracted in various seminar proceedings.

Transfer of knowledge and skills to industry and the local community has provided limited financial returns to the college. The Consultancy Cell publishes available expertise through circulars to various stakeholders. Some of the consultancy services offered include soil testing, water and soap analysis, mushroom cultivation, blood group identification and testing, bio-compost preparation, and disease diagnosis.

== Student life ==
=== Student Amenities ===
==== Central instrumentation facilities ====
1. UV-visible spectrophotometer
2. Fourier transform infrared spectrophotometer
3. High-performance liquid chromatography
4. Atomic Absorption spectrophotometer

==== Library ====
1. 69,021 volumes of books
2. 10 International journal subscription
3. 3142 online journal subscribed
4. Reprographic facility
5. Digital library

==== Personal Care ====
To ensure better individual personal assessment of students, each academic staff member serves as a Staff Guardian for approximately ten students and maintains a record book for each student.

=== Hostel ===
The campus has four in-house student hostel halls for both genders.

For more detailed information, see

=== Sports ===
A 16-station multi-gym facility has been developed. In addition to this, the campus includes four volleyball courts, two basketball courts, two tennis courts, one badminton court, two cricket grounds, two football fields, three kabaddi courts, one tenni-koi court, two kho-kho courts, as well as facilities for indoor games and yoga.
