= Idhayam (brand) =

Sesame oil brand

- Industry: Manufacturing
- Founded: 1986
- Founder: V.V.V. Rajendran
- Headquarters: Virudunagar, Tamil Nadu, India
- Products: Sesame oil
- Revenue: ▲₹5,690 million (US$59 million) (2020)
- Number of employees: 1,300
- Website: Official website

Idhayam is a sesame oil brand produced by V. V. V. and Sons Edible Oils Limited. The company was founded in December 1986 by V. V. V. Rajendran, however, soon thereafter, his sons V. R. Muthu, V. R. Sathyam and V. R. Thendral began to manage the operations of the company. V. R. Muthu was the CEO of the company.

The company started producing and marketing Mantra groundnut oil from the year 2006 starting in Tamil Nadu. It also has introduced the Mantra Brand in Kerala and Andhra Pradesh. Today the company sells its sesame and other oil brands in all Indian states and exports to 49 countries generating an annual revenue of Rs.569 Crores. The company is the fastest-growing oil brand in India, with a market share of 90% in sesame oil and 70% in groundnut oil.
