= MGM Group of Companies =

Indian diversified conglomerate

MGM Group
- Type: Private
- Industry: Conglomerate
- Founded: 1963
- Founder: Manuel Gnana Muthu
- Headquarters: Chennai, Tamil Nadu, India
- Area served: India, Singapore, Malaysia
- Key people: MGM. Anand; MGM. Maran
- Products: Alcohol, ports, Hospitality, logistics, Amusement parks, consumer products etc.
- Revenue: ₹2,500 crore (US$260 million)
- Number of employees: more than 1000
- Website: www.mgm-hotels.com mgm-india.com

MGM Group of Companies (abbreviation M. G. Muthu Group) is a diversified conglomerate Group of Companies headquartered in Chennai, Tamil Nadu.

== History ==
Manuel Gnana Muthu, the founder of the company, was born into a Christian family belonging to the Nadar caste. Without much education, Manuel Gnana Muthu began working as a coolie in the Madras docks. He went on to found the large group of companies with interests in logistics, distilleries, hospitality, theme park and trading.

== Business sectors ==
=== Distilleries ===
MGM owns Southern Agrifurane Industries in Tamil Nadu and Kamal Wineries in Andhra Pradesh. It is a 2500 crore company producing MGM Vodka, Gold Crown and Classic Fine whisky and a dozen other Indian made foreign liquor (IMFL) brands. It has a smaller Indian market with a monthly sale of 900 lakh cases. The company has a stronger vodka market in Tamil Nadu and has expanded it to neighboring Karnataka and Andhra Pradesh. A. K. M. A. Shamsuddin is the managing director of the company who has earlier worked in Shaw Wallace.

=== Logistics ===
Runs a logistics company, which has grown out from owning a truck, which was one of Manuel Gnana Muthu's first business investments.

=== Theme Park ===
MGM Dizzee World is an amusement park located in Chennai, Tamil Nadu, India. It is located on East Coast Road. It is one of the most visited theme parks in the city. The park has log flume, giant wheel, spider spin, roller coaster, the funny mountain, dashing cars, super trooper, a water world and it also hosts special seasonal shows. MGM Selvee World is the group's other theme park located at Visakhapatnam.

=== Marrybrown ===
MGM is the master Indian franchisee of Malaysian fast-food chain, Marrybrown for Southern region of India, which in turn franchises its Indian operations to smaller franchisees. The first Marrybrown outlet was opened in Chennai in 1999. In year 2004, it had 12 outlets in India and has expanded to 16 in 2007, 12 in Chennai, one each in Coimbatore, Salem, Kochi and Bangalore. In 2010, MGM opened a Marrybrown outlet in Trichy. MGM is expanding the number to 100. It provides training, marketing and raw material support to the franchisees and also helps maintain quality and ambience in the fast-food outlets. Of its 16 outlets, the company owns 10 and the rest are sub-franchised.

=== Hospitality ===
The group has close to 50 hotels across Portugal, Spain, France, Cuba, Kenya, England, Scotland and India. MGM Muthu Hotels has seven all-inclusive beach-front hotels in Portugal and eight in Cuba.
