= Standard Fireworks =

British-based firework company

- Type: Limited company
- Founded: 1891; 135 years ago in Huddersfield, West Riding of Yorkshire
- Founder: James Greenhalgh
- Headquarters: Huddersfield
- Products: Pyrotechnics
- Number of employees: 100+
- Parent: Black Cat Fireworks
- Website: www.blackcatfireworks.co.uk

Standard fireworks poster from 1928, showing children playing with fireworks

Standard Fireworks is a former British-based firework company, now a brand name of the Chinese firm Black Cat Fireworks.

== History ==
Standard was founded in 1891 by James Greenhalgh — pronounced /ˈɡriːnhælʃ/ (Greenhalsh) — in Huddersfield, West Yorkshire, England. Due to expansion, in 1910 the firm moved to its current site in Crosland Hill where, during the First and Second World Wars, the company produced munitions for the war effort. After the Second World War the company expanded its operations with two new sites in South Elmsall. The Crossland Moor site also functioned as a firework testing range and a distribution centre, both under the management of Sergeant Major Ellis Wood.

In 1959 the company was floated on the Stock Market and a period of domination in the UK fireworks industry began, with many retailers having to wait several years for an account with the company. In 1988 Standard bought Brocks Fireworks Ltd. This led to all firework activity being transferred to the Huddersfield site making Standard one of the largest employers in the Yorkshire region, with over 500 workers.

In 1998 Standard went into receivership. They were purchased by China-based Black Cat Fireworks, bringing an end to production in the UK. The Standard brand is now one of several trading names of Black Cat in the UK, with the former Standard offices now the UK headquarters for this operation.
