= M. G. Muthu =

Indian businessman (1935–2018)

Manuel Gnana Muthu (1935 – 23 May 2018) was the founder and first chairman of the MGM Group of Companies.

== Biography ==
Manuel Gnana Muthu was born in Thisayanvilai, a small village in Tirunelveli district of present-day Tamil Nadu into a family belonging to the Nadar caste who converted to Christianity. He was born into a poor family and started his career in 1952, working in the port of Chennai in a very low position. He went on to start the MGM Group of Companies with an interest in logistics, hospitality and the popular MGM Dizzee World theme park in Chennai. He has written an account of his life in a book titled Rags To Riches: Chevalier Seva Ratna Dr. M. G. Muthu: An Autobiography, published in 1999.
