= Mani Subramanian =

- Born: Chennai, India
- Occupation: Businessman

Mani Subramanian was the chairman of Keane International, Inc.

== Education ==
Mani holds a bachelor's degree in mechanical engineering from the Indian Institute of Technology, Chennai and a post-graduate diploma in business administration (PGDBA) from the Indian Institute of Management, Ahmedabad.

== Career ==
Mani founded the company IT Solutions, subsequently re-branded as Caritor, as a one-man operation in 1993. In 2007, Caritor achieved yet another milestone by combining with Keane. The company operated under the Keane brand name. In December 2010, Keane signed a definitive merger agreement with NTT Data, Japan. NTT Data is the subsidiary of NTT and it bought over Keane. Mani Subramanian moved out of Keane post this merger to form a venture in data analytics.

Mani has experience in the global information technology industry, managing divisions and businesses in the UK, India, and the United States. Prior to starting Caritor, Mani was the president of Wipro Systems and was responsible for leading Wipro through a period of significant growth in its IT offshoring business. Before joining Wipro, Mani was part of the management team at Tata Consultancy Services and was instrumental in growing their UK operation.

Mani has made several business-related contributions in the field of computer software.
