= V. R. Muthu =

Indian businessman (1953–2026)

V. Rajendran Muthu (6 October 1953 – 4 March 2026) was an Indian businessman who was the chief executive officer of Idhayam oil.

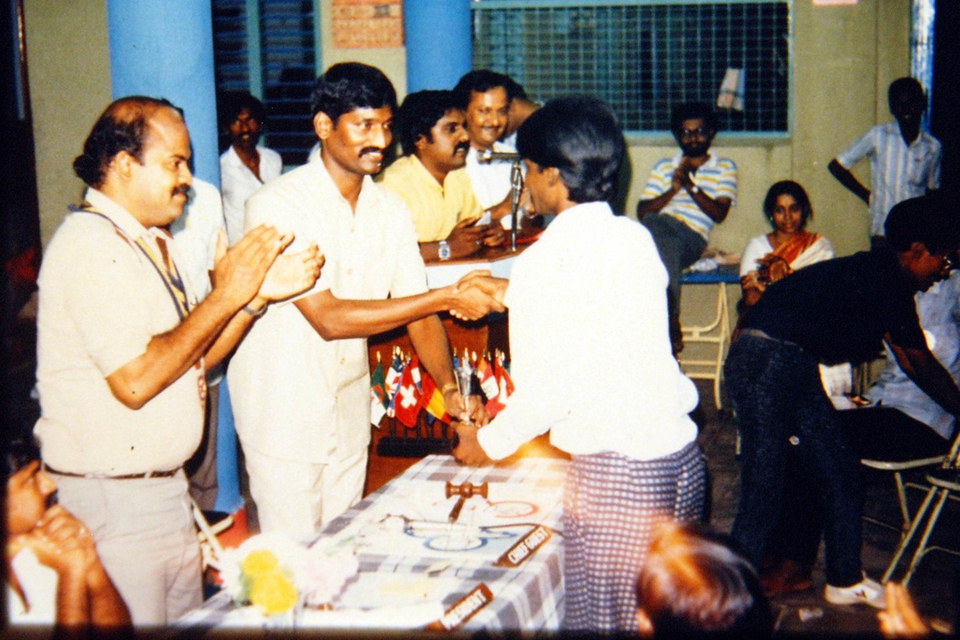

== Life and career ==
Muthu grew up in Virudhunagar, Tamil Nadu. He attended K.V.S. Higher Secondary School and St. Joseph College. He later graduated with a Bachelor of Commerce from M.M.K. College in Mumbai.

His father, V. V. V. Rajendran, founded Idhayam oil in 1986.

Muthu died on 4 March 2026, at the age of 72.

== Awards and recognition ==
Muthu received the TOBIP Award in 2007 from Junior Chamber International, Coimbatore, Tamil Nadu, recognizing him as one of India’s top businessmen.

He served as the president of Rotary Club of Virudhunagar (1989-90). In the Rotary Youth Leadership Award (RYLA) camp his club conducted in September 1989, Samuel JK Abraham, who was selected as the best participant, visited Japan as a member of the Rotary Youth Exchange team delegation from R.I Dist 322 (District Governor Rtn. Shanmugasundaram, Madurai) India to R.I Dist 262 (District Governor Dr.Oishi, Shizuoka) Japan, in April/May 1990, led by Mr. Dhinakaravel and Mr. Ligi George as team leaders.
