= R. K. Swamy =

Indian advertising industry executive (1922 – 2003)

R. K. Swamy (1922 – 2003) was an Indian advertising industry executive. He was involved in setting up the southern operations of J. Walter Thompson's Indian associate, Hindustan Thompson Associates (HTA).

== Career ==
In April 1973, he founded R. K. Swamy Advertising Associates in Chennai, subsequently expanding it to include businesses in New Delhi, Mumbai, Bangalore, Kolkata and Hyderabad. The company was one of India's top ten agencies within its first five years of operation. It went on to partner with BBDO, initially, in 1985, as a non-equity partner, and then, in 1990, as an equity partner, RK Swamy BBDO. Swamy was involved in making Madras an important location for the advertising industry. He was also at the helm of various industry bodies, the Audit Bureau of Circulations and Advertising Agencies Association of India among them. He also started Hansa Vision, a television programming company.

Outside of his advertising career, Swamy spent time on Hindu religious and cultural activities, especially on the restoration of temples and other historical structures.

In 2009, the All India Management Association established the AIMA-R K Swamy High Performance Brand Award in his honour.

== Personal life ==
Swamy's son Srinivasan Swamy became Chairman and Managing Director of his company after his death, his other son, Shekar Swamy, assuming the role of CEO.

== Bibliography and further reading ==
- Ramnarayan, V.; Chakrapani, V. S. (2007). R.K. Swamy: His Life and Times. East West Books. OCLC 191731848.
- "Swamy and his times". The Hindu Business Line. The Hindu Group. 7 June 2007.
- "An ad man's journey". Livemint. HT Media. 23 July 2007.
- "RK Swamy: The 'Grand Old Old Man' of Indian advertising". Rediff.com. 6 June 2003.
- "R. K. Swamy, a pioneer in public sector advertising". The Hindu. 31 May 2007.
- Bansal, Suchi (1 November 2007). "Adman & entrepreneur". Business Standard.
- "R.K. Swamy passes away". The Hindu Business Line. 6 June 2003.
- "'R.K. Swamy left a void in ad circles'". The Hindu Business Line. 19 June 2003.
