= M. Arunachalam (businessman) =

Businessperson

- Born: 1949; Tamil Nadu
- Occupation: Business

M. Arunaachalam (born 1949) is a Hong Kong–based businessman and entrepreneur, born and educated in India. He has previously been the chairman of The Indian Chamber of Commerce Hong Kong, and as of 2009, he has been a member of its General Committee. Arunaachalam is also the chairman of the Indian Chamber Fiftieth Anniversary Education Trust and the Disaster Relief Fund for India.

In 2005, he received the Pravasi Bharatiya Samman award, considered to be the most prestigious honour given to an Indian citizen located overseas.

== Biography ==
Early on in his career as a banker, Arunaachalam worked with the Indian Overseas Bank in India. After moving to Hong Kong in 1977, he established a company in the early 1980s for trading with Indonesia and India, which expanded over the years to become a conglomerate of companies dealing with international trade and manufacturing, as well as the handling of diverse products such as textiles, leather garments, food grains, steel, newsprint and paper, plastic products, construction and loading equipment, and software.

His company has manufacturing units in the Chinese cities of Beijing and Shanghai as well. He runs an engineering division in Ahmedabad and a few textile mills in Dindugal, Udumalpet and Tirupur region in Tamil Nadu. The group's companies have an extensive presence in India, China, Europe, the Middle East, South America and the US, with an annual turnover of over US$129 million.

Arunaachalam has been an active member of the Indian Chamber of Commerce in Hong Kong since the 1980s and was the Chairman of the Chamber for four terms. Arunaachalam has played an important role in promoting trade and investment between Hong Kong and India, and also between China and India. He has also held the post of president of the Asia Pacific Indian Chambers of Commerce and Industry and has been part of several delegations of Indian and Chinese businessmen to India, along with hosting several delegations from India. One of the Chamber's objectives is to promote Hong Kong as a gateway to China.

In 2004, he was appointed as an Investment Ambassador by "Invest HK", a promotional agency of the HKSAR Government. He has served as a member of the Trade Advisory Board, the Trade & Industry Advisory Board of the HKSAR Government, and the Toys Advisory Committee of the Trade Development Council of Hong Kong. During his chairmanship of the Chamber, he led a number of business delegations to various countries including China and India. He was also a member of the Indian business delegation to China as Chairman of the Indian Chamber of Commerce Hong Kong during the Indian Prime Minister's official visit to China.

During his chairmanship, the Chamber released a memorial book capturing the 160 years of the Indian community's contribution to Hong Kong in collaboration with the Chinese University of Hong Kong. He took lead in organizing business seminars in Beijing, jointly with C11, CCPIT and the Indian embassy. A number of business promotion seminars were organized in other countries. He is the vice-chairman of the Committee formed by the Indian community to organize the Hong Kong Community Chest Ball. He has been the Chairman of the Indian Community Diwali Ball, which represents the Indian community in Hong Kong, for the past five years. In 2007, he was elected as President of the Overseas Indian Organisation of Hong Kong and is still president at present.

== Pravasi Bharatiya Samman award ==
He has actively participated as a representative of Hong Kong in the Pravasi Bharatiya Divas, organized by the Government of India, every year since 2002, and has been one of the panelists on many occasions. During the Pravasi Bharatiya Divas held in Mumbai from 7–9 January 2005, Arunachalam was awarded the Pravasi Bharatiya Samman award, recognizing his contribution in promoting the honour and prestige of India and in fostering the interests of overseas Indians and promoting India-China trade. The award was presented to Arunaachalam by Dr. Abdul Kalam, the president of India.

M. Arunaachalam has been continuously promoting Indian culture in Hong Kong by organizing performances of artists from India and has contributed to various organizations in India. Arunaachalam is recognized for enhancing the image and understanding of India in Hong Kong and the adjoining regions.
