= MGM Dizzee World =

Theme park in Chennai, Tamil Nadu, India

Coordinates: 12.826458°N 80.243647°E

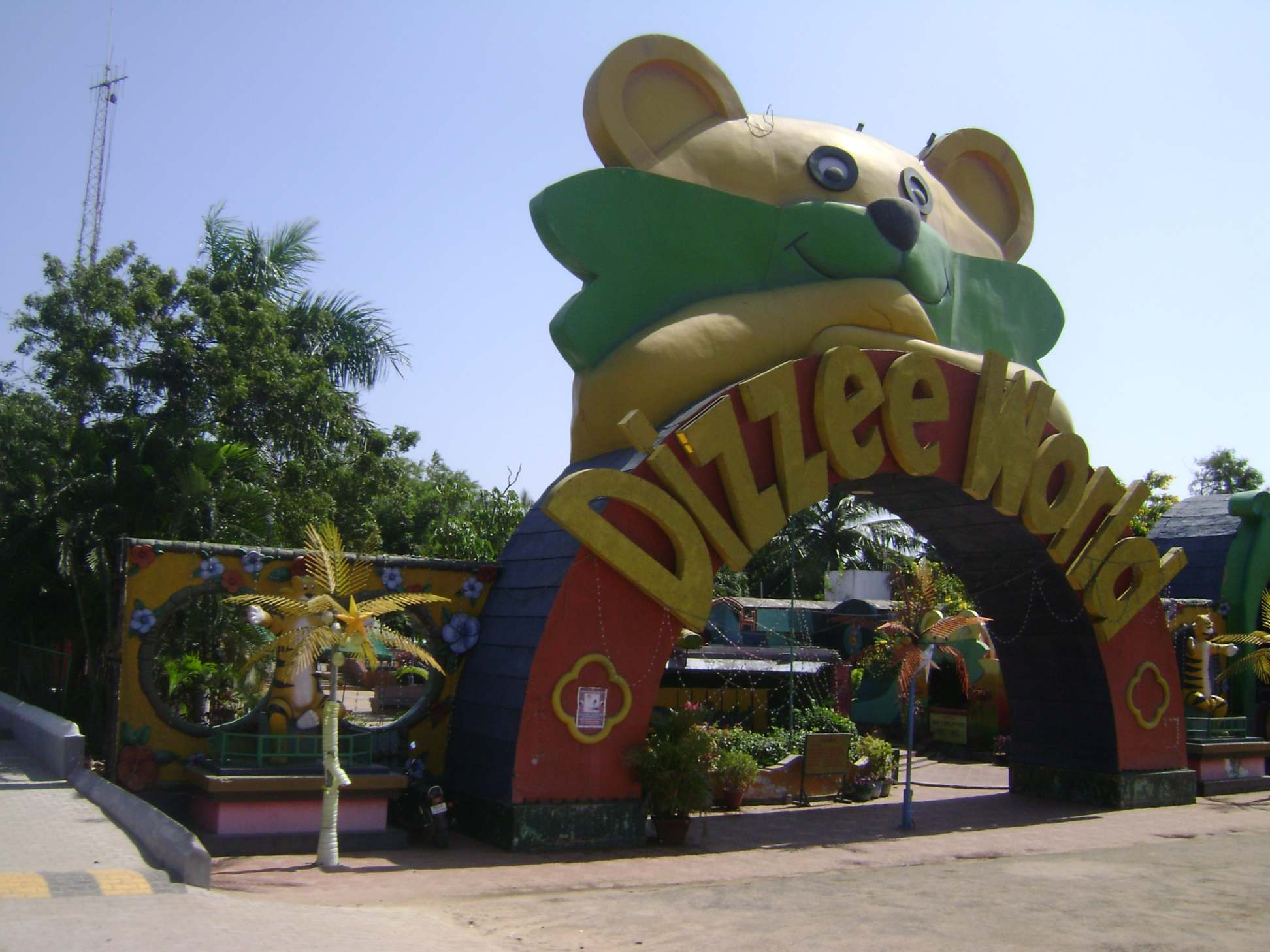
MGM Dizzee World entrance

MGM Dizzee World is an amusement park located on East Coast Road in Chennai, Tamil Nadu, India. The park has 47 rides, including a log flume, a Ferris wheel, a roller coaster, and bumper cars. It also has a water park, with sections for kids and adults. It also hosts special seasonal shows.

It is owned by MGM Group of Companies.

The park also has a snow valley experience which was introduced in the early 2000s, featuring an artificial snow shower with a snow-capped mountain.

== See also ==
- Tourism in Chennai
- East Coast Road
