= Sruti (magazine) =

Indian English language magazine

Sruti August 1990 issue dedicated to Kutiyattam maestro and authority of Rasa-Abhinaya, Padma Shri Guru Māni Mādhava Chākyār

Sruti is an English language monthly magazine on the performing arts and Indian music and dance, published from Chennai, India.

Sruti was founded in 1983 by N. Pattabhiraman, who had returned to India from a career abroad, bringing with him a focus and skill for English composition. The magazine initially had financial difficulties, with Pattabhiraman desiring to gain subscribers vice take out loans, and minimal support from corporations. The journal foundered somewhat following Pattabhiraman's death, but as of 2014 continues forward under staffers who rose to take over its leadership. The magazine was acquired by the Sanmar Group in 2006.

Journalist S. Muthiah in 2011 referred to the publication as the country's leading journal on Indian Classical music and dance.
